= List of Latvian football transfers winter 2012–13 =

This is a list of Latvian football transfers in the 2012–13 winter transfer window by club. Only transfers of the Virsliga are included.

All transfers mentioned are shown in the references at the bottom of the page. If you wish to insert a transfer that isn't mentioned there, please add a reference.

== Latvian Higher League ==
=== Daugava Daugavpils ===
In: Note: Flags indicate national team as defined under FIFA eligibility rules; some limited exceptions apply. Players may hold more than one non-FIFA nationality.

No.	Pos.	Nation	Player
1	GK	LAT	Igors Labuts (from Gulbene)
2	MF	JPN	Koichiro Iizuka (unattached)
3	DF	LAT	Igors Savčenkovs (from Skonto)
4	DF	NGR	Joseph Enakarhire (from (San Marino) La Fiorita)
5	MF	LAT	Armands Pētersons (from Skonto)
13	DF	NGR	Daniel Ola (from Jūrmala, previously on loan)
14	FW	NGR	Ibrahim Babatunde (unattached)
17	DF	LAT	Kirils Ševeļovs (from Skonto)
19	MF	MDA	Sergiu Japalau (from (Greece) Thrasyvoulos Fylis)

Out: Note: Flags indicate national team as defined under FIFA eligibility rules; some limited exceptions apply. Players may hold more than one non-FIFA nationality.

No.	Pos.	Nation	Player
2	MF	LAT	Jans Radevičs (on loan to Ilūkste)
4	DF	GEO	Bidzina Tsintsadze (to (Georgia (country)) Torpedo Kutaisi)
5	MF	MDA	Andrei Tcaciuc (loan return to (Moldova) Sfîntul Gheorghe)
14	MF	LAT	Maksims Rafaļskis (to (Iceland) Íþróttabandalag Akraness)
16	FW	LAT	Ēriks Kokins (on loan to Ilūkste)
19	DF	LAT	Dmitrijs Halvitovs (to Spartaks)
23	DF	CRO	Matija Mihalj (to (Croatia) Segesta Sisak)
25	DF	RUS	Dmitri Polovinchuk (released)
33	FW	GEO	Mamuka Ghonghadze (on loan to Ilūkste)
66	DF	RUS	Georgi Ulyanov (released)
88	GK	LAT	Kaspars Ikstens (to (Iceland) Víkingur Ólafsvík)
—	FW	RUS	Dmitri Kozlov (to Ilūkste, previously on loan)
—	GK	LAT	Igors Serkovs (released)
—	MF	LAT	Ričards Raščevskis (to BFC Daugava)

=== Skonto ===
In: Note: Flags indicate national team as defined under FIFA eligibility rules; some limited exceptions apply. Players may hold more than one non-FIFA nationality.

No.	Pos.	Nation	Player
1	GK	LTU	Paulius Grybauskas (from (Belarus) Shakhtyor Soligorsk)
3	DF	GEO	Lasha Dvali (from (Georgia (country)) Dinamo Tbilisi)
4	MF	GEO	Lado Datunashvili (from (Georgia (country)) Zooveti)
7	DF	LAT	Vladislavs Gabovs (from METTA/LU)
11	FW	LAT	Artūrs Karašausks (loan return from Gulbene)
15	MF	JPN	Shotaro Okada (from (Moldova) Olimpia Bălţi)
16	GK	LAT	Dmitrijs Grigorjevs (from Jelgava)
17	FW	LAT	Artjoms Osipovs (from Jūrmala)
21	FW	LAT	Vladislavs Glutkovskis (from Skonto-2)
22	MF	LAT	Nikolajs Zaicevs (loan return from (Estonia) Narva Trans)
—	DF	LAT	Ņikita Berenfelds (from Skonto-2)
—	DF	LAT	Dāvis Sandis Strods (from Skonto-2)
—	DF	RUS	Sergei Gushchin (from (Russia) DYuSSh Smena-Zenit)
—	DF	RUS	Vladislav Ovsyannikov (from (Russia) Akademiya Tolyatti)
—	DF	GHA	Ofosu Appiah (from (South Africa) Jomo Cosmos)
—	MF	LAT	Ingars Stuglis (from Skonto-2)
—	MF	RUS	Viktor Lipin (from (Russia) Lokomotiv-2 Moscow)
—	FW	GEO	Levan Chachiashvili (from (Uzbekistan) Pakhtakor Tashkent)

Out: Note: Flags indicate national team as defined under FIFA eligibility rules; some limited exceptions apply. Players may hold more than one non-FIFA nationality.

No.	Pos.	Nation	Player
1	GK	LAT	Germans Māliņš (to (Belarus) BATE Borisov)
3	DF	LAT	Igors Savčenkovs (to Daugava Daugavpils)
5	DF	UKR	Serhiy Shmatovalenko (released)
8	DF	MKD	Bojan Gjorgievski (loan return to (Belarus) BATE Borisov)
10	MF	JPN	Minori Sato (to (Belarus) Dinamo Brest)
11	MF	LAT	Armands Pētersons (to Daugava Daugavpils)
13	DF	RUS	Roman Amirkhanov (released)
17	DF	LAT	Vitālijs Maksimenko (to (England) Brighton & Hove Albion)
18	DF	LAT	Kirils Ševeļovs (to Daugava Daugavpils)
19	FW	LTU	Tadas Labukas (to (Russia) Torpedo Moscow)
21	MF	RUS	Aleksandr Kukanos (to (Russia) Khimki)
24	DF	RUS	Adil Ibragimov (loan return to (Russia) Fakel Voronezh)
—	DF	LAT	Toms Rajeckis (to Rīgas Futbola skola)
—	MF	LAT	Artjoms Lonščakovs (to Spartaks, previously on loan at METTA/LU)

=== Ventspils ===
In: Note: Flags indicate national team as defined under FIFA eligibility rules; some limited exceptions apply. Players may hold more than one non-FIFA nationality.

No.	Pos.	Nation	Player
24	MF	GEO	Tornike Tarkhnishvili (from (Georgia (country)) Sioni Bolnisi)
27	DF	LTU	Robertas Freidgeimas (from (Lithuania) Sūduva Marijampolė)

Out: Note: Flags indicate national team as defined under FIFA eligibility rules; some limited exceptions apply. Players may hold more than one non-FIFA nationality.

No.	Pos.	Nation	Player
6	MF	RUS	Igor Gilmanov (released)
19	FW	JPN	Yōsuke Saito (to (Russia) Ufa)
23	DF	LAT	Vladimirs Bespalovs (released)
24	MF	NGR	Christian John Agoh (released)
34	DF	LAT	Raivis Hščanovičs (to Daugava Rīga)
57	DF	RUS	Mikhail Badyautdinov (released)
—	MF	LAT	Romāns Bespalovs (to Jelgava, previously on loan)
—	MF	LAT	Igors Barinovs (to Jūrmala, previously on loan at Jelgava)
—	FW	LAT	Kaspars Svārups (on loan to Ilūkste, previously on loan at (Russia) Rubin Kazan)
—	FW	LAT	Pāvels Hohlovs (released)

=== Liepājas Metalurgs ===
In: Note: Flags indicate national team as defined under FIFA eligibility rules; some limited exceptions apply. Players may hold more than one non-FIFA nationality.

No.	Pos.	Nation	Player
2	MF	LAT	Madis Miķelsons (from Liepājas Metalurgs-2)
5	DF	LAT	Agris Otaņķis (from Liepājas Metalurgs-2)
7	MF	LAT	Jānis Ikaunieks (from Liepājas Metalurgs-2)
10	MF	LAT	Mareks Zuntners (from METTA/LU)
13	MF	LAT	Bogdans Petruks (from Liepājas Metalurgs-2)
14	DF	LAT	Endijs Šlampe (from Liepājas Metalurgs-2)
15	MF	LAT	Andrejs Kiriļins (from Liepājas Metalurgs-2)
25	DF	LAT	Ingus Šlampe (from Jūrmala)
28	DF	LAT	Antons Jemeļins (from Spartaks)
30	GK	LAT	Edgars Potapenko (from Liepājas Metalurgs-2)

Out: Note: Flags indicate national team as defined under FIFA eligibility rules; some limited exceptions apply. Players may hold more than one non-FIFA nationality.

No.	Pos.	Nation	Player
5	DF	LAT	Artjoms Kuzņecovs (to Jūrmala)
6	DF	LAT	Juris Kučma (to Varavīksne)
7	FW	LAT	Vladimirs Kamešs (to (Russia) Amkar Perm)
9	MF	LTU	Tomas Tamošauskas (to Daugava Rīga)
10	MF	LTU	Rytis Leliūga (to (Lithuania) Žalgiris Vilnius)
13	DF	LAT	Pāvels Surņins (retired)
15	FW	LAT	Ģirts Karlsons (to (Indonesia) Pro Duta)
18	DF	LAT	Pāvels Mihadjuks (to Daugava Rīga)
25	FW	LTU	Lukas Kochanauskas (to (Lithuania) Kruoja Pakruojis)
26	DF	LTU	Mindaugas Bagužis (to (Estonia) Sillamäe Kalev)

=== Spartaks ===
In: Note: Flags indicate national team as defined under FIFA eligibility rules; some limited exceptions apply. Players may hold more than one non-FIFA nationality.

No.	Pos.	Nation	Player
1	GK	LAT	Jevgēņijs Sazonovs (from Jelgava)
3	DF	LAT	Nikolajs Kulmanakovs (unattached)
5	DF	LAT	Dmitrijs Daņilovs (from Jelgava)
8	MF	LAT	Jevgēņijs Kazačoks (from Liepājas Metalurgs-2)
9	FW	COL	Kevin Mena (from (Colombia) Boyacá Chicó)
10	MF	LAT	Artjoms Lonščakovs (from Skonto)
11	MF	LAT	Aleksandrs Kļimovs (from Jelgava)
12	DF	LAT	Dāvids Bagdasarjans (from Skonto-2)
13	MF	LAT	Jevgēņijs Kosmačovs (from (Belarus) Shakhtyor Soligorsk)
14	FW	UKR	Andriy Antsybor (from ?)
15	MF	COL	Daniel García (unattached)
20	DF	LAT	Dmitrijs Halvitovs (from Daugava Daugavpils)
27	MF	LAT	Rihards Ivanovs (from Varavīksne)
34	MF	LAT	Aleksandrs Solovjovs (from Jūrmala)
—	MF	COL	Luis Angulo (from ?)
—	FW	LAT	Artūrs Krasnočubs (from Spartaks-2)
—	FW	LAT	Pāvels Pilāts (from Spartaks-2)

Out: Note: Flags indicate national team as defined under FIFA eligibility rules; some limited exceptions apply. Players may hold more than one non-FIFA nationality.

No.	Pos.	Nation	Player
2	MF	COL	Francisco Serna (to (Venezuela) Tucanes de Amazonas)
4	MF	LAT	Daniils Ulimbaševs (to Ilūkste)
5	MF	COL	José Mesa (released)
6	MF	LAT	Jevgēņijs Golovins (to Jūrmala)
9	FW	LAT	Romāns Rjabinskis (released)
10	FW	COL	David Cortés (to (Russia) Salyut Belgorod)
11	FW	LAT	Staņislavs Kolomijcevs (released)
13	DF	COL	Diego Agudelo (released)
14	MF	GHA	Joseph Gyawu (released)
19	MF	BRA	Alexsandro Araujo (to (Brazil) Atlético Monte Azul)
24	MF	FRA	Vafoubge Dosso (released)
26	FW	SEN	Moustapha Dabo (to (Azerbaijan) Gabala)
27	GK	LAT	Jānis Skābardis (to Auda)
28	DF	LAT	Antons Jemeļins (to Liepājas Metalurgs)
29	MF	LAT	Romāns Geiko (to Jūrmala-2)
30	GK	RUS	Aleksandr Nevokshonov (released)
37	GK	LAT	Aleksandrs Vlasovs (to Jelgava)
51	FW	BRA	Geraldo Batista (to (Brazil) Brasil de Farroupilha)
—	MF	COL	Carlos Rúa (to (Russia) Spartak Nalchik, previously on loan at Salyut Belgorod)
—	FW	COL	Jairo Mosquera (to (Russia) Salyut Belgorod, previously on loan)

=== Jūrmala ===
In: Note: Flags indicate national team as defined under FIFA eligibility rules; some limited exceptions apply. Players may hold more than one non-FIFA nationality.

No.	Pos.	Nation	Player
2	DF	RUS	Yuri Kulikov (from (Russia) Volga Tver)
4	DF	LAT	Artjoms Kuzņecovs (from Liepājas Metalurgs)
5	MF	JPN	Keisuke Ogawa (from (Thailand) Pattaya United)
6	MF	RUS	Konstantin Belov (from (Russia) Petrotrest Saint Petersburg)
7	MF	LAT	Sergejs Mišins (from Gulbene)
8	FW	JPN	Takaya Kawanabe (from (Singapore) Tanjong Pagar United)
10	FW	JPN	Hideaki Takeda (from Gulbene)
11	DF	LAT	Ivans Gluško (from Gulbene)
14	MF	RUS	Sergei Chasovsky (from (Russia) Dynamo Kostroma)
17	MF	LAT	Jevgēņijs Golovins (from Spartaks)
20	FW	LAT	Oļegs Malašenoks (from Jelgava)
23	DF	LAT	Anatolijs Maksimenko (from Gulbene)
24	MF	LAT	Kirils Grigorovs (from Gulbene)
25	DF	LAT	Romāns Gladiļins (from (Estonia) Sillamäe Kalev)
26	DF	RUS	Kirill Mikaelyan (from (Russia) Kolomna)
27	FW	LAT	Artjoms Loginovs (from METTA/LU)
77	GK	LAT	Alberts Nikoļskis (from Gulbene)
—	MF	LAT	Igors Barinovs (from Ventspils)
—	MF	LAT	Vlads Rimkus (from Tukums 2000)
—	FW	LAT	Arevšats Hačatrjans (from Gulbene)

Out: Note: Flags indicate national team as defined under FIFA eligibility rules; some limited exceptions apply. Players may hold more than one non-FIFA nationality.

No.	Pos.	Nation	Player
5	DF	LAT	Ingus Šlampe (to Liepājas Metalurgs)
7	FW	LAT	Artjoms Osipovs (to Skonto)
8	MF	LAT	Vadims Žuļevs (to Jelgava)
9	FW	LAT	Dmitrijs Paplavskis (to Jelgava)
10	FW	LAT	Ivans Sputajs (to Ilūkste)
11	FW	RUS	Vyacheslav Seletskiy (released)
12	DF	LAT	Deniss Kačanovs (to Daugava Rīga)
14	MF	AZE	Ulvi Gaibov (released)
17	FW	LAT	Maksims Daņilovs (to Jelgava)
20	MF	LAT	Vitālijs Rečickis (to Daugava Rīga)
21	DF	LAT	Edijs Joksts (loan return to Tukums 2000)
23	DF	LAT	Staņislavs Pihockis (to Gulbene)
28	FW	RUS	Mikhail Mysin (released)
69	MF	LAT	Aleksandrs Solovjovs (to Spartaks)
—	DF	NGR	Daniel Ola (to Daugava Daugavpils, previously on loan)

=== Jelgava ===
In: Note: Flags indicate national team as defined under FIFA eligibility rules; some limited exceptions apply. Players may hold more than one non-FIFA nationality.

No.	Pos.	Nation	Player
1	GK	LAT	Aleksandrs Vlasovs (from Spartaks)
5	DF	LAT	Dmitrijs Šiļuks (from Daugava Rīga)
9	MF	LAT	Vadims Žuļevs (from Jūrmala)
10	MF	LAT	Romāns Bespalovs (from Ventspils, previously on loan)
11	MF	LAT	Dmitrijs Medeckis (from (Estonia) Narva Trans)
16	GK	LAT	Kaspars Ribaks (from Valmiera)
18	FW	LAT	Maksims Kamkins (from METTA/LU)
20	FW	LAT	Dmitrijs Paplavskis (from Jūrmala)
21	MF	LAT	Daniels Vasiļjevs (from Tukums 2000)
29	FW	LAT	Maksims Daņilovs (from Jūrmala)

Out: Note: Flags indicate national team as defined under FIFA eligibility rules; some limited exceptions apply. Players may hold more than one non-FIFA nationality.

No.	Pos.	Nation	Player
1	GK	LAT	Jevgēņijs Sazonovs (to Spartaks)
3	DF	LAT	Jurijs Ksenzovs (to Jelgava-2)
5	DF	LAT	Dmitrijs Daņilovs (to Spartaks)
9	FW	LAT	Aleksejs Bespalovs (to Gulbene)
10	FW	LAT	Pāvels Hohlovs (loan return to Ventspils)
15	MF	LAT	Nils Sitenkovs (to Varavīksne)
16	GK	LAT	Dmitrijs Grigorjevs (to Skonto)
18	MF	LAT	Aleksandrs Kļimovs (to Spartaks)
20	DF	LAT	Artūrs Kļimovičs (released)
21	FW	FRA	Soumaïla Keita (to (Lithuania) Dainava Alytus)
22	MF	LAT	Igors Barinovs (loan return to Ventspils)
23	FW	LAT	Kārlis Kinderēvičs (released)
27	FW	NGR	Okechukwu Junior (released)
30	DF	LAT	Vadims Gaiļus (released)
33	FW	LAT	Oļegs Malašenoks (to Jūrmala)
34	MF	UKR	Serhiy Ilin (released)
35	MF	LTU	Darius Jankauskas (to (Lithuania) Šiauliai)
99	FW	LTU	Deividas Lukošius (released)

=== METTA/LU ===
In: Note: Flags indicate national team as defined under FIFA eligibility rules; some limited exceptions apply. Players may hold more than one non-FIFA nationality.

No.	Pos.	Nation	Player
3	DF	LAT	Artis Ojārs Ostrovskis (from METTA-2)
4	DF	LAT	Kārlis Putāns (from (United States) Fairleigh Dickinson Knights)
5	MF	LAT	Vladislavs Pavļučenko (from Daugava Rīga)
8	FW	LAT	Artūrs Švalbe (from METTA-2)
10	FW	LAT	Artūrs Blūms (from Skonto-2)
27	MF	LAT	Artašess Daniljans (from METTA-2)

Out: Note: Flags indicate national team as defined under FIFA eligibility rules; some limited exceptions apply. Players may hold more than one non-FIFA nationality.

No.	Pos.	Nation	Player
5	MF	LAT	Artjoms Zotovs (released)
8	FW	LAT	Artjoms Loginovs (to Jūrmala)
13	DF	LAT	Vladislavs Gabovs (to Skonto)
18	MF	LAT	Artjoms Lonščakovs (loan return to Skonto)
18	FW	LAT	Maksims Kamkins (to Jelgava, previously on loan at Rīgas Futbola skola)
25	MF	LAT	Mareks Zuntners (to Liepājas Metalurgs)
28	DF	LAT	Mārtiņš Ozols (to METTA-2)
66	DF	LAT	Jānis Kauss (to METTA-2)
79	GK	LAT	Gvido Ķikāns (released)

=== Daugava Rīga ===
In: Note: Flags indicate national team as defined under FIFA eligibility rules; some limited exceptions apply. Players may hold more than one non-FIFA nationality.

No.	Pos.	Nation	Player
2	DF	LTU	Linas Klimavičius (from (Ukraine) Dnipro Dnipropetrovsk)
3	DF	LAT	Raivis Hščanovičs (from Ventspils)
6	DF	LTU	Valdemaras Borovskis (from (Lithuania) Sūduva Marijampolė)
7	MF	LTU	Mantas Savėnas (from (Kazakhstan) Sunkar)
8	DF	LAT	Deniss Kačanovs (from Jūrmala)
9	MF	LTU	Tomas Tamošauskas (from Liepājas Metalurgs)
10	MF	LTU	Ernestas Veliulis (from (Lithuania) Kruoja Pakruojis)
17	MF	LAT	Nikolajs Kozačuks (unattached)
18	DF	LAT	Pāvels Mihadjuks (from Liepājas Metalurgs)
20	MF	LAT	Vitālijs Rečickis (from Jūrmala)
23	FW	LAT	Kristaps Grebis (from (Germany) Viktoria 1889)
69	FW	CRO	Tedi Surać (from (Croatia) Metalac Osijek)
88	MF	LTU	Dominykas Galkevičius (from (Belarus) Belshina Bobruisk)
92	FW	LAT	Valērijs Čistjakovs (from (Lithuania) Kruoja Pakruojis)

Out: Note: Flags indicate national team as defined under FIFA eligibility rules; some limited exceptions apply. Players may hold more than one non-FIFA nationality.

No.	Pos.	Nation	Player
3	DF	LAT	Dmitrijs Šiļuks (to Jelgava)
5	DF	LAT	Deniss Sokoļskis (to Ilūkste)
8	MF	LAT	Vadims Gospodars (to (Belarus) Neman Grodno)
10	MF	LAT	Aleksandrs Gramovičs (released)
12	MF	LTU	Deividas Kapustas (released)
14	MF	LAT	Artjoms Uļjanovs (to Gulbene)
17	MF	UKR	Stepan Glubokiy (released)
19	FW	UKR	Andriy Zadoyko (released)
20	DF	LAT	Reinis Broders (to Rīgas Futbola skola)
21	DF	LAT	Artis Novickis (to Tukums 2000)
24	DF	RUS	Kirill Korban (released)
26	MF	LAT	Vladislavs Pavļučenko (to METTA/LU)
27	DF	LAT	Otto Rihters (to Rēzeknes BJSS)

=== Ilūkste ===
In: Note: Flags indicate national team as defined under FIFA eligibility rules; some limited exceptions apply. Players may hold more than one non-FIFA nationality.

No.	Pos.	Nation	Player
—	GK	LAT	Georgijs Čižovs (from BFC Daugava)
—	GK	RUS	Gleb Sochavo (from (Russia) Tom Tomsk-2)
—	GK	LAT	Edgars Vaņins (from Vikingi)
—	DF	LAT	Deniss Sokoļskis (from Daugava Rīga)
—	DF	LAT	Edijs Ivaško (from Gulbene)
—	DF	LAT	Aleksandrs Abramenko (from (Estonia) Narva Trans)
—	DF	LAT	Aleksandrs Ivanovs (from Gulbene)
—	DF	RUS	Andrey Bezhonov (from (Russia) Khimik Koryazhma)
—	MF	LAT	Aleksejs Kuplovs-Oginskis (from (Estonia) Narva Trans)
—	MF	LAT	Daniils Ulimbaševs (from Spartaks)
—	MF	JPN	Yoki Kumada (from (Poland) Pogoń II Szczecin)
—	MF	LAT	Jans Radevičs (on loan from Daugava Daugavpils)
—	FW	RUS	Dmitri Kozlov (from Daugava Daugavpils, previously on loan)
—	FW	LAT	Ivans Sputajs (from Jūrmala)
—	FW	ISR	Alexander Davydov (from ?)
—	FW	LAT	Kaspars Svārups (on loan from Ventspils)
—	FW	LAT	Ēriks Kokins (on loan from Daugava Daugavpils)
—	FW	GEO	Mamuka Ghonghadze (on loan from Daugava Daugavpils)

Out: Note: Flags indicate national team as defined under FIFA eligibility rules; some limited exceptions apply. Players may hold more than one non-FIFA nationality.

No.	Pos.	Nation	Player
1	GK	LAT	Igors Serkovs (loan return to Daugava Daugavpils)
2	DF	LAT	Andrejs Žuromskis (released)
6	DF	LAT	Vladimirs Žavoronkovs (retired)
13	DF	LAT	Sergejs Iļjahovs (to Rēzeknes BJSS)
14	DF	LAT	Vjačeslavs Vansovičs (to Rēzeknes BJSS)
15	MF	LAT	Pāvels Koļcovs (to BFC Daugava)
18	FW	BLR	Pavel Ryzhevski (to BFC Daugava)
44	MF	LAT	Ričards Raščevskis (loan return to Daugava Daugavpils)
