= 2012 Latvian Higher League =

Latvian football league season for the highest division

Latvian Higher League
- Season: 2012
- Champions: FC Daugava
- Relegated: FB Gulbene
- Champions League: FC Daugava
- Europa League: Skonto Riga; FK Ventspils; SK Liepājas Metalurgs
- Matches: 180
- Goals: 494 (2.74 per match)
- Top goalscorer: Mamuka Ghonghadze (18)
- Biggest home win: Jūrmala 6-1 Daugava Daugavpils; Skonto Rīga 5-0 Metta/LU; Ventspils 5-0 Daugava Rīga
- Biggest away win: Metta/LU 1-6 Ventspils; Gulbene 2005 0-5 Ventspils; Metta/LU 0-5 Daugava Daugavpils
- Highest scoring: Jelgava 3-4 Daugava Rīga; Metta/LU 1-6 Ventspils; Jūrmala 6-1 Daugava Daugavpils; Daugava Rīga 2-5 Spartaks; Spartaks 3-4 Metta/LU

The 2012 Latvian Higher League was the 21st season of top-tier football in Latvia. It began on 24 March 2012 and ended on 10 November 2012. FK Ventspils are the defending champions.

The league comprised ten teams, one more than in the previous season.

== Teams ==
The league returned to a ten-team circuit after having been forced to play the 2011 season with only nine teams, following the withdrawal of SK Blāzma a few weeks before the season commenced. As a consequence of the Blāzma withdrawal, no team was directly relegated.

2011 Latvian First League champions FS METTA/Latvijas Universitāte from Riga were directly promoted. The team, which was founded by the METTA football school and the University of Latvia in 2007, entered the Higher League for the first time in their history.

JFK Olimps/RFS finished the 2011 season in ninth place and were therefore required to compete in a two-legged promotion/relegation play-off against First Division runners-up Spartaks Jūrmala. Spartaks won the play-off 4–1 on aggregate and were therefore promoted to the Higher League. Similar to METTA/LU, they made their debut at the highest level of the Latvian football pyramid. Accordingly, Olimps/RFS were relegated to the First League after five seasons at the top flight.

=== Stadiums and locations ===
Location of teams in the 2012 Latvian Higher League

Following the promotion of FK Spartaks, the city of Jūrmala should have featured three clubs during the 2012 season, one more than the capital, Riga, but FK Jūrmala-VV moved to Riga, changing their name to Daugava Riga.

Club	Location	Stadium	Capacity
FC Daugava	Daugavpils	Daugava Stadium	4,100
FK Daugava Rīga	Riga	Daugava Stadium	5,000
FB Gulbene	Gulbene	Gulbenes Sporta Centrs	1,500
FK Jelgava	Jelgava	Zemgales Olimpiskais Sporta Centrs	2,200
FC Jūrmala	Jūrmala	Slokas Stadium	5,000
SK Liepājas Metalurgs	Liepāja	Daugava Stadium	5,083
FS Metta/LU	Riga	Rīgas 49. vidusskola Stadium	250
Skonto FC	Riga	Skonto Stadium	10,000
FK Spartaks Jūrmala	Jūrmala	Slokas Stadium	5,000
FK Ventspils	Ventspils	Olimpiskais Stadium	3,200

=== Personnel and kits ===
Note: Flags indicate national team as has been defined under FIFA eligibility rules. Players and Managers may hold more than one non-FIFA nationality.

Team	Manager	Captain	Kit manufacturer	Shirt sponsor
FC Daugava	(Moldova) Ivan Tabanov	(Latvia) Jurijs Sokolovs	Erreà	—
FK Daugava Rīga	(Latvia) Jurijs Popkovs	(Latvia) Vadims Gospodars	Adidas	—
FB Gulbene	(Latvia) Mihails Koņevs	(Latvia) Alberts Nikoļskis	Erreà	Piebalga
FK Jelgava	(Latvia) Dainis Kazakevičs	(Latvia) Valērijs Redjko	Macron	LDz Cargo
FC Jūrmala	(Latvia) Vladimirs Pačko	(Latvia) Maksims Daņilovs	Givova	—
SK Liepājas Metalurgs	(Latvia) Jānis Intenbergs	(Lithuania) Tomas Tamošauskas	Adidas	—
FS Metta/LU	(Latvia) Andris Riherts	(Latvia) Romāns Rožkovskis	Nike	SMS Credit.lv
Skonto FC	(Latvia) Marians Pahars	(Latvia) Germans Māliņš	Kappa	—
FK Spartaks Jūrmala	(Lithuania) Arminas Narbekovas	(Latvia) Nauris Bulvītis	Masita	—
FK Ventspils	(Latvia) Jurģis Pučinskis	(Latvia) Vitālijs Smirnovs	Adidas	VK Tranzīts

=== Managerial changes ===
Team	Outgoing manager	Manner of departure	Date of vacancy	Position in table	Incoming manager	Date of appointment
Daugava Daugavpils	(Russia) Leonid Nazarenko	Sacked	2011-12-22	pre-season	(Russia) Ravil Sabitov	2011-12-22
Spartaks Jūrmala	(Latvia) Artūrs Šketovs	Sacked	2012-02-02	pre-season	(Latvia) Oļegs Blagonadeždins	2012-02-02
Daugava Daugavpils	(Russia) Ravil Sabitov	Sacked	2012-04-29	5th	(Moldova) Ivan Tabanov	2012-05-05
Liepājas Metalurgs	(Latvia) Vladimirs Osipovs	Sacked	2012-05-01	6th	(Latvia) Jānis Intenbergs	2012-05-24
FK Ventspils	(Ukraine) Sergey Podpaly	Sacked	2012-05-18	4th	(Latvia) Jurģis Pučinskis	2012-05-18
Spartaks Jūrmala	(Latvia) Oļegs Blagonadeždins	Sacked	2012-07-20	4th	(Lithuania) Arminas Narbekovas	2012-07-23

== Broadcasting ==
Just as last season most of the matches were transmitted live via sportacentrs.com online and Sportacentrs' TV channel. In June 2012 broadcasting rights were also bought by the English company Bet365. Since 2012 league's homepage futbolavirsliga.lv has been active and since September 2012 this website has been accompanied by InStat Football system, showing information and analysis of each match individually. Since October 2012 Virslīga has also had its own analytical broadcast after each round of matches, with football experts discussing the games and future events connected to Latvian football. It's transmitted via Sportacentrs TV.

== League table ==
Pos	Team	Pld	W	D	L	GF	GA	GD	Pts	Qualification or relegation
1	Daugava Daugavpils (C)	36	23	9	4	64	25	+39	78	Qualification for Champions League second qualifying round
2	Skonto	36	21	11	4	58	22	+36	74	Qualification for Europa League first qualifying round
3	Ventspils	36	23	5	8	63	22	+41	74	Qualification for Europa League first qualifying round (Note: Winners of the 2012–13 Latvian Football Cup.)
4	Liepājas Metalurgs	36	21	7	8	60	33	+27	70	Qualification for Europa League first qualifying round
5	Spartaks Jūrmala	36	13	10	13	61	56	+5	49	
6	Jūrmala	36	10	9	17	47	49	−2	39	
7	Jelgava	36	7	10	19	32	56	−24	31	
8	METTA/LU	36	7	8	21	39	82	−43	29	
9	Daugava Rīga (O)	36	5	12	19	42	79	−37	27	Qualification for relegation play-offs
10	FB Gulbene (R)	36	5	9	22	28	70	−42	24	Relegation to Latvian First League

Source: LFF:Virslīga 2012
Rules for classification: 1st points; 2nd head-to-head points; 3rd head-to-head goal difference; 4th overall wins; 5th goal difference; 6th goals scored
(C) Champions; (O) Play-off winners; (R) Relegated

=== Relegation play-offs ===
The 9th-placed sides will face the runners-up of the 2012 Latvian First League in a two-legged play-off, with the winner being awarded a spot in the 2013 Higher League competition. The dates and exact sequence of these matches are still to be determined.

14 November 2012
18:00

FK Daugava Rīga	1–0	BFC Daugava
Broders 54'	Report

Daugava Stadium, Riga
Referee: Aleksandrs Golubevs

18 November 2012
14:00

BFC Daugava	1–3	FK Daugava Rīga
Ostrovskis 68'	Report	6' Gospodarjs; 21' Kapustas; 70' Kārkliņš

Daugava Stadium, Daugavpils
Referee: Andris Treimanis

== Results ==
First half of season
Home \ Away	DGD	GUL	JEL	FCJ	DGR	LIE	MLU	SKO	SPJ	VEN
FC Daugava Daugavpils		3–0	2–0	2–0	3–1	0–0	2–0	1–1	1–0	3–0
FB Gulbene	0–2		1–2	2–0	0–0	1–1	5–1	0–1	0–3	0–5
Jelgava	1–2	0–1		0–2	3–4	0–2	1–4	1–2	1–3	0–2
FC Jūrmala	6–1	2–2	0–0		1–1	0–2	0–0	3–3	0–1	1–2
FK Daugava Rīga	0–4	2–2	1–0	1–1		1–3	1–0	1–1	1–2	1–4
SK Liepājas Metalurgs	2–0	0–1	1–1	2–0	1–0		3–2	0–1	1–2	0–0
METTA/LU	1–1	0–0	1–1	0–2	0–3	4–1		1–2	2–1	1–6
Skonto FC	3–0	4–1	2–3	1–0	1–0	0–1	5–0		1–0	1–0
Spartaks Jūrmala	2–2	3–1	2–0	0–0	2–2	2–2	3–1	2–2		2–0
Ventspils	1–2	3–0	0–1	1–1	2–0	0–3	1–0	0–0	3–2	

Source: Latvian Higher League
Legend: Blue = home team win; Yellow = draw; Red = away team win.

Second half of season
Home \ Away	DGD	GUL	JEL	FCJ	DGR	LIE	MLU	SKO	SPJ	VEN
FC Daugava Daugavpils		1–0	0–0	2–0	3–0	0–0	1–0	0–0	3–2	0–0
FB Gulbene	1–3		0–1	0–1	2–1	1–3	0–3	0–4	0–1	1–2
Jelgava	0–2	0–0		1–3	2–2	1–2	1–1	1–1	3–2	0–1
FC Jūrmala	2–4	4–0	3–1		2–3	0–2	3–0	0–0	0–3	0–1
Daugava Rīga	0–3	1–1	1–2	1–2		3–3	1–1	1–3	2–5	0–4
SK Liepājas Metalurgs	1–3	3–1	2–0	3–2	4–0		4–1	1–0	2–1	1–0
METTA/LU	0–5	1–1	1–3	0–3	4–3	1–0		1–2	3–3	0–2
Skonto FC	0–0	3–1	2–0	1–0	1–1	3–1	5–0		0–0	1–0
Spartaks Jūrmala	0–3	2–2	1–1	4–2	2–2	0–3	3–4	0–1		0–3
Ventspils	1–0	4–0	0–0	2–1	5–0	1–0	4–0	1–0	2–0	

Source: Latvian Higher League
Legend: Blue = home team win; Yellow = draw; Red = away team win.

== Season statistics ==
=== Top scorers ===
As of 7 November 2012

Rank	Player	Club	Goals
1	(Georgia (country)) Mamuka Ghonghadze	FC Daugava	18
2	(Japan) Yōsuke Saito	FB Gulbene/FK Ventspils	15
3	(Colombia) David Cortés	FK Spartaks Jūrmala	12
3	(Latvia) Daniils Turkovs	FK Ventspils	12
5	(Latvia) Antons Jemeļins	FK Spartaks Jūrmala	11
5	(Lithuania) Tadas Labukas	Skonto FC	11
5	(Latvia) Valērijs Šabala	Skonto FC	11
7	(Nigeria) Stanley Ibe	FC Daugava	10
7	(Latvia) Valērijs Afanasjevs	SK Liepājas Metalurgs	10
7	(Latvia) Vladimirs Kamešs	SK Liepājas Metalurgs	10
7	(Latvia) Mārtiņš Milašēvičs	FS Metta/LU	10
7	(Ghana) Patrick Twumasi	FK Spartaks Jūrmala	10
7	(Latvia) Vitālijs Ziļs	FK Daugava Rīga	10

== Player of the Month ==
Month	Player	Club
March/April	(Japan) Yōsuke Saito	Gulbene
May	(Georgia (country)) Mamuka Ghonghadze	Daugava Daugavpils
June	(Latvia) Valērijs Šabala	Skonto Riga
July	(Russia) Sergei Yashin	Daugava Daugavpils
August	(Lithuania) Rytis Leliūga	Liepājas Metalurgs
September	(Latvia) Ģirts Karlsons	Liepājas Metalurgs
October/November	(Latvia) Vladimirs Kamešs	Liepājas Metalurgs

== Manager of the Month ==
Month	Manager	Club
March/April	(Latvia) Marians Pahars	Skonto Riga
May	(Latvia) Oļegs Blagonadeždins	Spartaks Jūrmala
June	(Latvia) Marians Pahars	Skonto Riga
July	(Moldova) Ivan Tabanov	Daugava Daugavpils
August	(Latvia) Jurģis Pučinsks	Ventspils
September	(Latvia) Andris Riherts	Metta/LU
October/November	(Moldova) Ivan Tabanov	Daugava Daugavpils

== Team of the Tournament ==
=== LFF version ===
Position	Player	Club
Goalkeeper	(Latvia) Germans Māliņš	Skonto Riga
Defender	(Russia) Dmitri Polovinchuk	Daugava Daugavpils
Defender	(Latvia) Vitālijs Maksimenko	Skonto Riga
Defender	(Latvia) Igors Savčenkovs	Skonto Riga
Defender	(Latvia) Nauris Bulvītis	Spartaks Jūrmala
Midfielder	(Nigeria) Daniel Ola	Daugava Daugavpils
Midfielder	(Latvia) Aleksandrs Fertovs	Skonto Riga
Midfielder	(Turkmenistan) Ruslan Mingazov	Skonto Riga
Forward	(Latvia) Vladimirs Kamešs	Liepājas Metalurgs
Forward	(Japan) Yosuke Saito	Ventspils
Forward	(Georgia (country)) Mamuka Ghonghadze	Daugava Daugavpils
Manager	(Moldova) Ivan Tabanov	Daugava Daugavpils

=== Sportacentrs.com version ===
Position	Player	Club
Goalkeeper	(Latvia) Maksims Uvarenko	Ventspils
Defender	(Russia) Dmitri Polovinchuk	Daugava Daugavpils
Defender	(Latvia) Vitālijs Maksimenko	Skonto Riga
Defender	(Latvia) Vitālijs Smirnovs	Ventspils
Defender	(Latvia) Jurijs Sokolovs	Daugava Daugavpils
Midfielder	(Nigeria) Daniel Ola	Daugava Daugavpils
Midfielder	(Latvia) Igors Tarasovs	Ventspils
Midfielder	(Latvia) Mihails Ziziļevs	Daugava Daugavpils
Forward	(Latvia) Vladimirs Kamešs	Liepājas Metalurgs
Forward	(Nigeria) Ahmed Abdultaofik	Ventspils
Forward	(Nigeria) Stanley Ibe	Daugava Daugavpils
Manager	(Moldova) Ivan Tabanov	Daugava Daugavpils

== Awards ==
LFF awards 2012
Category	Winner	Club
Best goalkeeper	(Latvia) Germans Māliņš	Skonto Riga
Best defender	(Latvia) Vitālijs Maksimenko	Skonto Riga
Best midfielder	(Latvia) Vladimirs Kamešs	Liepājas Metalurgs
Best forward	(Georgia (country)) Mamuka Ghonghadze	Daugava Daugavpils
Top scorer	(Georgia (country)) Mamuka Ghonghadze	Daugava Daugavpils
Best U-21 player	(Latvia) Valērijs Šabala	Skonto Riga
Best player	(Latvia) Vladimirs Kamešs	Liepājas Metalurgs
Best manager	(Moldova) Ivan Tabanov	Daugava Daugavpils
Fair play award	Club	Daugava Daugavpils
Best match organisation	Club	Metta/LU
