= Minori Sato =

Japanese footballer

Personal information
- Full name: Minori Sato
- Date of birth: 2 March 1991 (age 35)
- Place of birth: Gunma, Japan
- Height: 1.68 m (5 ft 6 in)
- Position: Midfielder

Youth career
- 2006–2008: Maebashi Ikuei High School

Senior career*
Years	Team	Apps	(Gls)
2009	Thespa Kusatsu	21	(0)
2010	Indiana Invaders	10	(1)
2010–2011	Puebla	1	(0)
2010	→ Gulbene (loan)	7	(10)
2011	Ventspils	12	(0)
2011–2012	Skonto	36	(4)
2013	Dinamo Brest	27	(0)
2014–2016	Bunyodkor	71	(10)
2017	Muaither	12	(2)
2017	Riga	10	(0)
2018	Gwangju	12	(0)
2019	Riga	10	(1)
2019–2020	SKA-Khabarovsk	11	(0)
- * Club domestic league appearances and goals as of 13 February 2020

Minori Sato (佐藤 穣, Satō Minori; born 2 March 1991) is a Japanese former football player.

== Club career ==
Sato started his professional career in the J2 League. In 2010, after a trial with the Primera División de México club Puebla FC, he signed a 4-year contract. The same year he was sent on loan to FB Gulbene, that time playing in the Latvian First League, in order to gain experience before joining Puebla FC back from loan. He scored 10 goals in 7 games there, attracting interest from other Latvian clubs. In March, 2011 he signed a contract with Virsliga club FK Ventspils for one season. He won the Latvian Cup with the team, beating Liepājas Metalurgs in the final. He played 12 matches there, without scoring any goals before being transferred to another Latvian Higher League team Skonto Riga in August 2011. Sato played 38 league matches, scoring 3 goals for Skonto during 2 seasons in the Latvian Higher League with the club. In March 2013 he was transferred to the Belarusian Premier League club Dinamo Brest.

In March 2014, Sato signed a two-year contract with FC Bunyodkor in the Uzbek League, and upon making his debut became Bunyodkor's 25th foreign representative.

In January 2018, Sato signed Gwangju FC.

On 27 August 2019, he signed with Russian Football National League side SKA-Khabarovsk.

As of 2023, he played for FC Bunyodkor in Uzbekistan.

== Club statistics ==
=== Club ===
As of match played 23 November 2019

Appearances and goals by club, season and competition
Club	Season	League			National Cup		League Cup		Continental		Other^{1}		Total	
Club	Season	Division	Apps	Goals	Apps	Goals	Apps	Goals	Apps	Goals	Apps	Goals	Apps	Goals
Thespa Kusatsu	2009	J2 League	21	0	1	0	–		–		–		22	0
Gulbene-2005 (loan)	2010	Latvian First League	7	10	1	1	–		–		–		8	11
Ventspils	2011	Latvian Higher League	12	0	3	0	–		1	0	3	0	19	0
Skonto	2011	Latvian Higher League	13	3	0	0	–		0	0	–		13	3
Skonto	2012	Latvian Higher League	23	0	3	1	–		0	0	–		26	1
Skonto	Total		36	3	3	1	-	-	0	0	-	-	39	4
Dinamo Brest	2013	Belarusian Premier League	27	0	3	0	–		–		–		30	0
Bunyodkor	2014	Uzbek League	15	1	4	0	-		0	0	0	0	19	1
Bunyodkor	2015	Uzbek League	28	4	5	0	-		7	0	-		40	4
Bunyodkor	2016	Uzbek League	27	5	6	1	-		6	0	-		39	6
Bunyodkor	Total		71	10	15	1	-	-	13	0	0	0	99	11
Muaither	2016–17	Qatar Stars League	12	2	0	0	–		–		0	0	0	0
Riga	2017	Latvian Higher League	10	0	4	0	–		–		–		14	0
Gwangju	2018	K League 2	12	0	0	0	–		–		–		12	0
Riga	2019	Latvian Higher League	10	1	1	0	–		0	0	–		11	1
SKA-Khabarovsk	2019–20	FNL	11	0	2	0	–		–		–		13	0
Career total			230	23	33	3	-	-	14	0	3	0	280	26

^{3}Includes Baltic League.

== Awards and honours ==
=== Club ===
Gulbene 2005

- Latvian First League: 2010

Ventspils

- Latvian Football Cup: 2010–11

Skonto FC

- Latvian Football Cup: 2011–12
