= Polovinchuk =

Polovinchuk (Russian: Половинчук) is a Russian and Ukrainian surname. Notable people with the surname include:

- Dmitri Polovinchuk (born 1982), Russian footballer
- Kateryna Polovinchuk (born 1995), Ukrainian pool player
