= Hideaki Takeda =

Japanese footballer

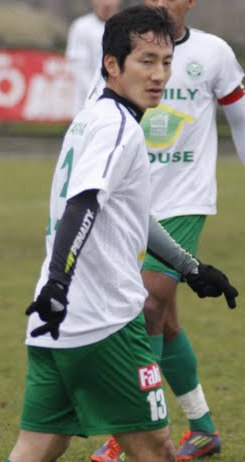

Personal information
- Full name: Hideaki Takeda
- Date of birth: May 22, 1985 (age 41)
- Place of birth: Saitama, Japan
- Height: 1.68 m (5 ft 6 in)
- Position: Forward

Youth career
- 2004–2007: Ryutsu Keizai University

Senior career*
Years	Team	Apps	(Gls)
2008–2010	Fagiano Okayama	63	(4)
2010	Matsumoto Yamaga FC	1	(0)
2011	Indiana Invaders	16	(5)
2011	Gulbene	10	(6)
2012	Nõmme Kalju	13	(0)
2012	Gulbene	15	(6)
2013	Jūrmala	12	(0)
Total		130	(21)
- * Club domestic league appearances and goals

Hideaki Takeda (武田 英明, Takeda Hideaki; born May 22, 1985) is a former Japanese football player.

== Career ==
On 7 March 2012, it was announced that he had signed a two-year contract with Estonian Meistriliiga side JK Nõmme Kalju. Takeda made the league debut for the club on 10 March 2012, in a goalless draw against city rivals FC Levadia Tallinn. On 19 June 2012, he scored four goals in a 17–0 cup win over amateurs SK Eestimaa Kasakad. The contract was mutually terminated on 24 July and the player rejoined his previous club FB Gulbene in the Latvian Higher League. Gulbene were relegated from the Latvian Higher League after the 2012 season, and Takeda joined FC Jūrmala in February 2013. He played 12 matches for Jūrmala, scoring no goals and left the club in July 2013.

== Club statistics ==
Club performance			League		Cup		Total	
Season	Club	League	Apps	Goals	Apps	Goals	Apps	Goals
Japan			League		Emperor's Cup		Total	
2005	Ryutsu Keizai University	Football League	1	0	-		1	0
2006	Ryutsu Keizai University	Football League	11	3	0	0	11	3
2007	Ryutsu Keizai University	Football League	13	2	0	0	13	2
2008	Fagiano Okayama	Football League	22	2	3	2	25	4
2009	Fagiano Okayama	J2 League	41	2	1	0	42	2
2010	Fagiano Okayama	J2 League	0	0	0	0	0	0
2010	Matsumoto Yamaga FC	Football League	1	0	1	0	2	0
Country	Japan		89	9	5	2	94	11
United States			League		Open Cup		Total	
2011	Indiana Invaders	PDL	16	5	-		16	5
Latvia			League		Latvian Cup		Total	
2011	Gulbene	Higher League	10	6	-		10	6
Estonia			League		Estonian Cup		Total	
2012	JK Nõmme Kalju	Meistriliiga	13	0	1	4	14	4
Latvia			League		Latvian Cup		Total	
2012	Gulbene	Higher League	15	6	-		15	6
