= Igors Labuts =

Latvian footballer (born 1990)

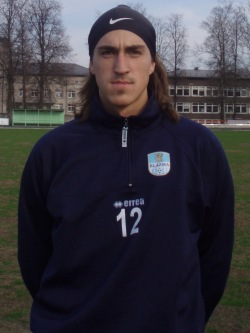
- Labuts in training with Blāzma Rēzekne

Personal information
- Date of birth: 7 June 1990 (age 36)
- Place of birth: Daugavpils, Latvian SSR, Soviet Union (now Republic of Latvia)
- Height: 1.97 m (6 ft 6 in)
- Position: Goalkeeper

Youth career
- 2002–2006: Ditton Daugavpils

Senior career*
Years	Team	Apps	(Gls)
2007–2009	Blāzma Rēzekne	9	(0)
2009–2010	Sporting Fingal	3	(0)
2010−2012	FB Gulbene	26	(0)
2013	Daugava Daugavpils	0	(0)
2013	→ Ilūkstes NSS (loan)	14	(0)
2014	FC Jūrmala	8	(0)
2014−2015	Atlético CP	36	(0)
2016−2017	Spartaks Jūrmala	0	(0)
2017−2018	Athlone Town	4	(0)
2019	New Project	9	(0)

International career
2006−2007	Latvia U-17	5	(0)
2007−2008	Latvia U-18	7	(0)
2008−2009	Latvia U-19	7	(0)
- * Club domestic league appearances and goals as of 19 August 2019 (UTC)

Igors Labuts (born 7 June 1990) is a Latvian former professional footballer who played as a goalkeeper.

== Club career ==
Born in Daugavpils, Labuts career started in Ditton Daugavpils, being a member of the youth system since 2002. After five years, in 2007, at the age of 16, he was invited to join the Latvian Higher League newcomers Blāzma Rēzekne. Initially, he was the club's third-choice keeper, later that season he became the second choice. Labuts made his debut for Blāzma on 8 November 2008 in a 2-2 draw against Vindava Ventspils for the Latvian First League.

In summer of 2009 Labuts moved abroad, joining the League of Ireland Premier Division club Sporting Fingal. After six months, with the Irish club unable to pay the requested transfer fee for a further stay, Labuts returned to Latvia.

In January 2010, he joined the Latvian First League club FB Gulbene, helping them win the league and earn a promotion to the Latvian Higher League for the 2011 season. For the next two seasons Labuts played in the top tier of Latvian football, but after Gulbene's relegation in 2012, he switched clubs and moved to the incumbent Latvian champions Daugava Daugavpils at the beginning of 2013. Serving as a back-up keeper for half a season, Labuts was loaned out to Ilūkstes NSS in July 2013 in order to retain playing practice.

Before the start of the 2014 season, Labuts joined the Latvian Higher League club FC Jūrmala. After the club was struck by financial problems, he was let go and eventually ended up in Portugal, joining the Portuguese Segunda Liga club Atlético CP. On 9 August 2014 Labuts made his professional debut with Atlético in a Segunda Liga match against Freamunde.

In September 2017 the FAI banned Labuts and teammate Dragos Sfrijan for 12 months after a UEFA investigation found "clear and overwhelming betting evidence" of fixing of Athlone's 29 April match against Longford Town in the 2017 League of Ireland First Division. The Professional Footballers' Association of Ireland said the decision was based on "half-baked innuendo". Labuts' appeal against his suspension was rejected in October 2018.

Labuts moved to Latvia's First League to FC New Project in 2019.

== International career ==
Labuts was a member of Latvia U-17, Latvia U-18 and Latvia U-19 football teams, but has not been called up to the senior side yet.

== Personal life ==
Aside from his own professional footballer's career Labuts also works at the Just4Keepers International Goalkeeper Academy as a youth coach for aspiring keepers in Latvia. While playing in Latvia, Labuts was also studying at the Latvian Sports Academy, acquiring a bachelor's degree in Sports Science.

== Honours ==
FB Gulbene

- Latvian First League (1): 2010
