= UEFA Euro 2020 qualifying Group G =

Group of six football teams

Group G of UEFA Euro 2020 qualifying was one of the ten groups to decide which teams would qualify for the UEFA Euro 2020 finals tournament. Group G consisted of six teams: Austria, Israel, Latvia, North Macedonia, Poland and Slovenia, where they played against each other home-and-away in a round-robin format.

The top two teams, Poland and Austria, qualified directly for the finals. Unlike previous editions, the participants of the play-offs were not decided based on results from the qualifying group stage, but instead based on their performance in the 2018–19 UEFA Nations League.

== Standings ==
Pos	Team	Pld	W	D	L	GF	GA	GD	Pts	Qualification	(Poland)	(Austria)	(North Macedonia)	(Slovenia)	(Israel)	(Latvia)
1	Poland	10	8	1	1	18	5	+13	25	Qualify for final tournament	—	0–0	2–0	3–2	4–0	2–0
2	Austria	10	6	1	3	19	9	+10	19	Qualify for final tournament	0–1	—	2–1	1–0	3–1	6–0
3	North Macedonia	10	4	2	4	12	13	−1	14 (Note: Head-to-head points: North Macedonia 4, Slovenia 1.)	Advance to play-offs via Nations League	0–1	1–4	—	2–1	1–0	3–1
4	Slovenia	10	4	2	4	16	11	+5	14		2–0	0–1	1–1	—	3–2	1–0
5	Israel	10	3	2	5	16	18	−2	11	Advance to play-offs via Nations League	1–2	4–2	1–1	1–1	—	3–1
6	Latvia	10	1	0	9	3	28	−25	3		0–3	1–0	0–2	0–5	0–3	—

Source: UEFA
Rules for classification: Qualification tiebreakers

== Matches ==
The fixtures were released by UEFA the same day as the draw, which was held on 2 December 2018 in Dublin. Times are CET/CEST, (Note: CET (UTC+1) for matches in March and November 2019, and CEST (UTC+2) for all other matches.) as listed by UEFA (local times, if different, are in parentheses).

21 March 2019
20:45

Austria	0–1	Poland
	Report	Piątek 69'

Ernst-Happel-Stadion, Vienna
Attendance: 40,400
Referee: Anastasios Sidiropoulos (Greece)
21 March 2019
20:45

North Macedonia	3–1	Latvia
Alioski 11'; Elmas 29', 90+3'	Report	Velkovski 87' (o.g.)

Philip II Arena, Skopje
Attendance: 7,043
Referee: Halis Özkahya (Turkey)
21 March 2019
20:45 (21:45 UTC+2)

Israel	1–1	Slovenia
Zahavi 55'	Report	Šporar 48'

Sammy Ofer Stadium, Haifa
Attendance: 12,430
Referee: Tiago Martins (Portugal)

24 March 2019
18:00 (19:00 UTC+2)

Israel	4–2	Austria
Zahavi 34', 45', 55'; Dabbur 66'	Report	Arnautović 8', 75'

Sammy Ofer Stadium, Haifa
Attendance: 16,180
Referee: Yevhen Aranovskyi (Ukraine)
24 March 2019
20:45

Poland	2–0	Latvia
Lewandowski 76'; Glik 84'	Report

National Stadium, Warsaw
Attendance: 51,112
Referee: Aliyar Aghayev (Azerbaijan)
24 March 2019
20:45

Slovenia	1–1	North Macedonia
Zajc 34'	Report	Bardhi 47'

Stožice Stadium, Ljubljana
Attendance: 9,872
Referee: Xavier Estrada Fernández (Spain)

7 June 2019
20:45

Austria	1–0	Slovenia
Burgstaller 74'	Report

Wörthersee Stadion, Klagenfurt
Attendance: 19,200
Referee: Aleksei Kulbakov (Belarus)
7 June 2019
20:45

North Macedonia	0–1	Poland
	Report	Piątek 47'

Toše Proeski Arena, Skopje
Attendance: 22,000
Referee: Gianluca Rocchi (Italy)
7 June 2019
20:45 (21:45 UTC+3)

Latvia	0–3	Israel
	Report	Zahavi 10', 60', 81'

Daugava Stadium, Riga
Attendance: 5,508
Referee: Sergey Ivanov (Russia)

10 June 2019
20:45

North Macedonia	1–4	Austria
Hinteregger 18' (o.g.)	Report	Lazaro 39'; Arnautović 62' (pen.), 82'; Bejtulai 86' (o.g.)

Toše Proeski Arena, Skopje
Attendance: 10,501
Referee: Aleksei Eskov (Russia)
10 June 2019
20:45 (21:45 UTC+3)

Latvia	0–5	Slovenia
	Report	Črnigoj 24', 27'; Iličić 29' (pen.), 44'; Zajc 47'

Daugava Stadium, Riga
Attendance: 4,011
Referee: Kevin Clancy (Scotland)
10 June 2019
20:45

Poland	4–0	Israel
Piątek 35'; Lewandowski 56' (pen.); Grosicki 59'; Kądzior 84'	Report

National Stadium, Warsaw
Attendance: 57,229
Referee: Tobias Stieler (Germany)

5 September 2019
20:45 (21:45 UTC+3)

Israel	1–1	North Macedonia
Zahavi 55'	Report	Ademi 64'

Turner Stadium, Be'er Sheva
Attendance: 15,200
Referee: Andreas Ekberg (Sweden)
6 September 2019
20:45

Austria	6–0	Latvia
Arnautović 7', 53' (pen.); Sabitzer 13'; Šteinbors 76' (o.g.); Laimer 80'; Gregoritsch 85'	Report

Stadion Wals-Siezenheim, Wals-Siezenheim
Attendance: 16,300
Referee: Robert Hennessy (Republic of Ireland)
6 September 2019
20:45

Slovenia	2–0	Poland
Struna 35'; Šporar 65'	Report

Stožice Stadium, Ljubljana
Attendance: 15,231
Referee: Sergei Karasev (Russia)

9 September 2019
20:45

Latvia	0–2	North Macedonia
	Report	Pandev 14'; Bardhi 17'

Daugava Stadium, Riga
Attendance: 2,724
Referee: Espen Eskås (Norway)
9 September 2019
20:45

Poland	0–0	Austria
	Report

National Stadium, Warsaw
Attendance: 56,788
Referee: Viktor Kassai (Hungary)
9 September 2019
20:45 (21:45 UTC+3)

Slovenia	3–2	Israel
Verbič 43', 90'; Bezjak 66'	Report	Natkho 50'; Zahavi 63'

Stožice Stadium, Ljubljana
Attendance: 10,669
Referee: Anthony Taylor (England)

10 October 2019
20:45

Austria	3–1	Israel
Lazaro 41'; Hinteregger 56'; Sabitzer 88'	Report	Zahavi 34'

Ernst-Happel-Stadion, Vienna
Attendance: 26,200
Referee: Willie Collum (Scotland)
10 October 2019
20:45

North Macedonia	2–1	Slovenia
Elmas 50', 68'	Report	Iličić 90+5' (pen.)

Toše Proeski Arena, Skopje
Attendance: 16,500
Referee: Danny Makkelie (Netherlands)
10 October 2019
20:45 (21:45 UTC+3)

Latvia	0–3	Poland
	Report	Lewandowski 9', 13', 76'

Daugava Stadium, Riga
Attendance: 7,107
Referee: Halis Özkahya (Turkey)

13 October 2019
20:45

Poland	2–0	North Macedonia
Frankowski 74'; Milik 80'	Report

National Stadium, Warsaw
Attendance: 52,894
Referee: Antonio Mateu Lahoz (Spain)
13 October 2019
20:45

Slovenia	0–1	Austria
	Report	Posch 21'

Stožice Stadium, Ljubljana
Attendance: 15,108
Referee: Cüneyt Çakır (Turkey)
15 October 2019
20:45 (21:45 UTC+3)

Israel	3–1	Latvia
Dabbur 16', 42'; Zahavi 26'	Report	Kamešs 40'

Turner Stadium, Be'er Sheva
Attendance: 9,150
Referee: Arnold Hunter (Northern Ireland)

16 November 2019
18:00

Slovenia	1–0	Latvia
Tarasovs 53' (o.g.)	Report

Stožice Stadium, Ljubljana
Attendance: 11,224
Referee: Radu Petrescu (Romania)
16 November 2019
20:45

Austria	2–1	North Macedonia
Alaba 7'; Lainer 48'	Report	Stojanovski 90+3'

Ernst-Happel-Stadion, Vienna
Attendance: 41,100
Referee: Michael Oliver (England)
16 November 2019
20:45 (21:45 UTC+2)

Israel	1–2	Poland
Dabbur 88'	Report	Krychowiak 4'; Piątek 54'

Teddy Stadium, Jerusalem
Attendance: 16,700
Referee: Mattias Gestranius (Finland)

19 November 2019
20:45 (21:45 UTC+2)

North Macedonia	1–0	Israel
Nikolov 45+2'	Report

Toše Proeski Arena, Skopje
Attendance: 5,573
Referee: Paolo Valeri (Italy)
19 November 2019
20:45

Latvia	1–0	Austria
Ošs 65'	Report

Daugava Stadium, Riga
Attendance: 2,781
Referee: Alejandro Hernández Hernández (Spain)
19 November 2019
20:45

Poland	3–2	Slovenia
Szymański 3'; Lewandowski 54'; Góralski 81'	Report	Matavž 14'; Iličić 61'

National Stadium, Warsaw
Attendance: 53,946
Referee: Daniel Siebert (Germany)

== Goalscorers ==
There were 84 goals scored in 30 matches, for an average of 2.8 goals per match.

11 goals

- (Israel national football team) Eran Zahavi

6 goals

- (Austria national football team) Marko Arnautović
- (Poland national football team) Robert Lewandowski

4 goals

- (Israel national football team) Mu'nas Dabbur
- (North Macedonia national football team) Eljif Elmas
- (Poland national football team) Krzysztof Piątek
- (Slovenia national football team) Josip Iličić

2 goals

- (Austria national football team) Valentino Lazaro
- (Austria national football team) Marcel Sabitzer
- (North Macedonia national football team) Enis Bardhi
- (Slovenia national football team) Domen Črnigoj
- (Slovenia national football team) Andraž Šporar
- (Slovenia national football team) Benjamin Verbič
- (Slovenia national football team) Miha Zajc

1 goal

- (Austria national football team) David Alaba
- (Austria national football team) Guido Burgstaller
- (Austria national football team) Michael Gregoritsch
- (Austria national football team) Martin Hinteregger
- (Austria national football team) Konrad Laimer
- (Austria national football team) Stefan Lainer
- (Austria national football team) Stefan Posch
- (Israel national football team) Bibras Natkho
- (Latvia national football team) Vladimirs Kamešs
- (Latvia national football team) Mārcis Ošs
- (North Macedonia national football team) Arijan Ademi
- (North Macedonia national football team) Ezgjan Alioski
- (North Macedonia national football team) Boban Nikolov
- (North Macedonia national football team) Goran Pandev
- (North Macedonia national football team) Vlatko Stojanovski
- (Poland national football team) Przemysław Frankowski
- (Poland national football team) Kamil Glik
- (Poland national football team) Jacek Góralski
- (Poland national football team) Kamil Grosicki
- (Poland national football team) Damian Kądzior
- (Poland national football team) Grzegorz Krychowiak
- (Poland national football team) Arkadiusz Milik
- (Poland national football team) Sebastian Szymański
- (Slovenia national football team) Roman Bezjak
- (Slovenia national football team) Tim Matavž
- (Slovenia national football team) Aljaž Struna

1 own goal

- (Austria national football team) Martin Hinteregger (against North Macedonia)
- (Latvia national football team) Pāvels Šteinbors (against Austria)
- (Latvia national football team) Igors Tarasovs (against Slovenia)
- (North Macedonia national football team) Egzon Bejtulai (against Austria)
- (North Macedonia national football team) Darko Velkovski (against Latvia)

== Discipline ==
A player was automatically suspended for the next match for the following offences:

- Receiving a red card (red card suspensions could be extended for serious offences)
- Receiving three yellow cards in three different matches, as well as after fifth and any subsequent yellow card (yellow card suspensions were not carried forward to the play-offs, the finals or any other future international matches)

The following suspensions were served during the qualifying matches:

Team	Player	Offence(s)	Suspended for match(es)
Israel	Dor Peretz	(yellow card) vs Slovenia (21 March 2019); (yellow card) vs Latvia (7 June 2019); (yellow card) vs Slovenia (9 September 2019)	vs Austria (10 October 2019)
Latvia	Andrejs Cigaņiks	(yellow card) (yellow-red card) vs North Macedonia (21 March 2019)	vs Poland (24 March 2019)
Latvia	Jānis Ikaunieks	(yellow card) vs Poland (24 March 2019); (yellow card) vs North Macedonia (9 September 2019); (yellow card) vs Israel (15 October 2019)	vs Slovenia (16 November 2019)
Latvia	Vitālijs Maksimenko	(yellow card) vs Poland (24 March 2019); (yellow card) vs North Macedonia (9 September 2019); (yellow card) vs Poland (10 October 2019)	vs Israel (13 October 2019)
North Macedonia	Egzon Bejtulai	(yellow card) vs Slovenia (24 March 2019); (yellow card) vs Austria (10 June 2019); (yellow card) vs Latvia (9 September 2019)	vs Slovenia (10 October 2019)
North Macedonia	Visar Musliu	(yellow card) vs Slovenia (24 March 2019); (yellow card) (yellow-red card) vs Poland (7 June 2019); (yellow card) vs Slovenia (10 October 2019); (yellow card) vs Poland (13 October 2019)	vs Austria (10 June 2019) vs Austria (16 November 2019)
North Macedonia	Ilija Nestorovski	(yellow card) vs Slovenia (24 March 2019); (yellow card) vs Poland (7 June 2019); (yellow card) vs Poland (13 October 2019)	vs Austria (16 November 2019)
North Macedonia	Boban Nikolov	(yellow card) vs Slovenia (24 March 2019); (yellow card) vs Israel (5 September 2019); (yellow card) vs Poland (13 October 2019)	vs Austria (16 November 2019)
Slovenia	Bojan Jokić	(yellow card) vs Israel (21 March 2019); (yellow card) vs North Macedonia (24 March 2019); (yellow card) vs Latvia (10 June 2019)	vs Poland (6 September 2019)
Slovenia	Denis Popović	(red card) vs Austria (13 October 2019)	vs Latvia (16 November 2019)
Slovenia	Aljaž Struna	(yellow card) vs Poland (6 September 2019); (yellow card) vs Austria (13 October 2019); (yellow card) vs Latvia (16 November 2019)	vs Poland (19 November 2019)
