= Igors Tarasovs =

Latvian footballer

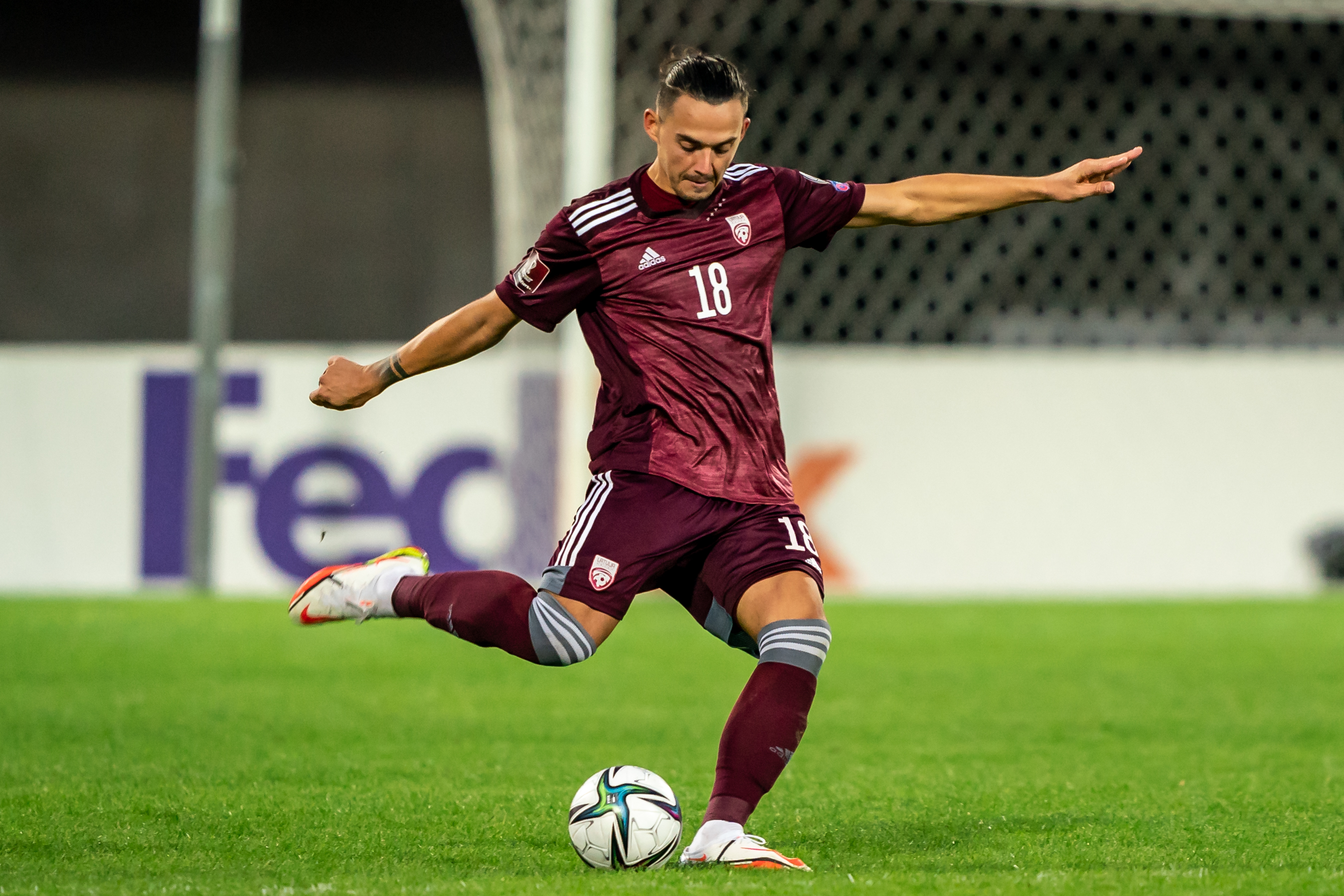

Personal information
- Full name: Igors Tarasovs
- Date of birth: 16 October 1988 (age 38)
- Place of birth: Riga, Latvian SSR, USSR (now Republic of Latvia)
- Height: 1.90 m (6 ft 3 in)
- Position: Centre-back

Youth career
- 2004–2006: JFC Skonto

Senior career*
Years	Team	Apps	(Gls)
2006–2011	Skonto Riga	84	(11)
2007–2008	→ Olimps/RFS (loan)	50	(2)
2012	Simurq	14	(3)
2012–2013	Ventspils	37	(8)
2014	Neman Grodno	27	(1)
2015–2016	Jagiellonia Białystok	41	(3)
2016–2017	Giresunspor	15	(2)
2017–2019	Śląsk Wrocław	52	(2)
2019	Spartaks Jūrmala	10	(3)
2020	Kaposvár	7	(0)
2020	KuPS	8	(0)
2020	→ KuFu-98 (loan)	2	(0)
2021–2022	Ethnikos Achna	35	(0)
2022	Liepāja	5	(0)
2022–2023	Ypsonas	25	(11)
2023	Nordic United	10	(0)
2024–2025	Hutnik Kraków	38	(1)
2025–2026	Jagiellonia Białystok II	14	(1)
Total		474	(48)

International career
2008–2010	Latvia U21	8	(1)
2010–2022	Latvia	47	(2)
- * Club domestic league appearances and goals

Igors Tarasovs (born 16 October 1988) is a Latvian former professional footballer who played as a centre-back.

== Club career ==
As a youth player, Tarasovs played for JFC Skonto and was promoted to the first team in 2006. Making just one first team appearance, he was soon loaned out to the unofficial Skonto Riga farm-team Olimps/RFS to get playing practice. During his loan spell from 2007 to 2008, Tarasovs played 50 matches and scored two goals. He returned to Skonto in 2009, becoming a starting player. Representing the club for three years, Tarasovs made 84 league appearances and scored eleven goals, becoming the Latvian champion in 2010 and the Baltic League champion in 2011. In 2011, the fans voted him as the Skonto Riga Player of the Season.

At the start of 2012, Tarasovs refused to extend his contract with Skonto and went on trials with Jagiellonia Białystok in Poland, Inter Baku in Azerbaijan and Tatran Prešov in Slovakia. On 15 February, Tarasovs signed a contract with the Azerbaijan Premier League club Simurq PFC until the end of the season, joining his international team-mate Andrejs Rubins. Tarasovs scored three goals in 14 games that season, helping his team secure a place in the top tier for the upcoming season.

In July 2012, Tarasovs returned to Latvia, signing a contract with the Latvian Higher League club Ventspils. Throughout two seasons with the club, he scored eight goals in 37 league matches and helped the team win the championship and the Latvian Football Cup in 2013. Tarasovs also participated in the UEFA Champions League and the UEFA Europa League qualifying matches.

Tarasovs went on trials with Baník Ostrava and Bodø/Glimt in the Czech Republic and Norway, but eventually signed a contract with the Belarusian Premier League club Neman Grodno in February 2014. On 22 March 2014, Tarasovs scored the winning goal for Neman in the extra-time of Belarusian Cup quarter-final match against BATE Borisov, securing his team a 2–1 victory and a place in the semi-finals. He scored in the 100th minute, beating his international team-mate Germans Māliņš in the BATE Borisov goal.

On 27 November 2014, Tarasovs signed a one-year contract with the Polish Ekstraklasa club Jagiellonia Białystok, with an option to extend for two more seasons.

On 7 July 2017, he moved to Śląsk Wrocław.

On 9 August 2019, it was confirmed that Tarasovs had joined Spartaks Jūrmala.

== International career ==
Tarasovs was a regular player for Latvia U21 from 2008 to 2010. He scored once in eight appearances. Tarasovs was firstly called up for Latvia international squad for a friendly match against Angola on 3 March 2010. He made his debut then coming on as a replacement for Vitālijs Astafjevs in the 73rd minute.

== Career statistics ==
=== Club ===
Appearances and goals by club, season and competition
Club	Season	League			National cup (Note: Includes Latvian Cup, Belarusian Cup, Polish Cup)		Europe		Total	
Club	Season	Division	Apps	Goals	Apps	Goals	Apps	Goals	Apps	Goals
Skonto Riga	2006	Virslīga	1	0	?	?	0	0	1	0
Skonto Riga	2009	Virslīga	30	2	0	0	2 (Note: Appearances in UEFA Europa League)	0	32	2
Skonto Riga	2010	Virslīga	24	5	2	0	2	0	28	5
Skonto Riga	2011	Virslīga	29	4	2	0	2 (Note: Appearances in UEFA Champions League)	0	33	4
Skonto Riga	Total		84	11	4	0	6	0	94	11
JFK Olimps (loan)	2007	Virslīga	27	0	1	0	—		28	0
JFK Olimps (loan)	2008	Virslīga	23	2	0	0	2 (Note: Appearances in UEFA Cup)	0	25	2
JFK Olimps (loan)	Total		50	2	1	0	2	0	53	2
Simurq	2011–12	Azerbaijan Premier League	14	3	0	0	—		14	3
Ventspils	2012	Virslīga	16	4	—		—		16	4
Ventspils	2013	Virslīga	21	4	4	0	6	0	31	4
Ventspils	Total		37	8	4	0	6	0	47	8
Neman Grodno	2014	Belarusian Premier League	27	1	4	1	2	0	33	2
Jagiellonia Białystok	2014–15	Ekstraklasa	15	1	—		—		15	1
Jagiellonia Białystok	2015–16	Ekstraklasa	26	2	1	0	4	0	31	2
Jagiellonia Białystok	Total		41	3	1	0	4	0	46	3
Giresunspor	2016–17	TFF 1. Lig	15	2	—		—		15	2
Śląsk Wrocław	2017–18	Ekstraklasa	35	1	1	0	—		36	1
Śląsk Wrocław	2018–19	Ekstraklasa	17	1	2	0	—		19	1
Śląsk Wrocław	Total		52	1	3	0	—		55	1
Spartaks Jūrmala	2019	Virslīga	10	3	—		—		10	3
Kaposvár	2019–20	NB I	7	0	0	0	—		7	0
KuPS	2020	Veikkausliiga	8	0	0	0	3	1	11	1
KuFu-98	2020	Kakkonen	2	0	—		—		2	0
Ethnikos Achna	2020–21	Cypriot First Division	16	0	1	0	—		17	0
Ethnikos Achna	2021–22	Cypriot First Division	19	0	5	1	—		24	1
Ethnikos Achna	Total		35	0	6	1	0	0	41	1
Liepāja	2022	Virslīga	5	0	1	0	3 (Note: Appearances in UEFA Europa Conference League)	0	9	0
Ypsonas	2022–23	Cypriot Second Division	25	11	1	0	—		26	11
Nordic United	2023	Ettan	10	0	—		—		10	0
Hutnik Kraków	2023–24	II liga	11	0	—		—		11	0
Hutnik Kraków	2024–25	II liga	27	1	0	0	—		27	1
Hutnik Kraków	Total		38	1	0	0	0	0	38	1
Jagiellonia II	2025–26	III liga, group I	14	1	—		—		14	1
Career total			474	48	25	2	26	1	525	51

=== International ===
Appearances and goals by national team and year
National team	Year	Apps	Goals
Latvia
Latvia	2010	1	0
Latvia	2011	2	0
Latvia	2013	1	0
Latvia	2015	7	0
Latvia	2016	7	0
Latvia	2017	4	1
Latvia	2018	8	0
Latvia	2019	4	0
Latvia	2020	2	1
Latvia	2021	8	0
Latvia	2022	3	0
Total		47	2

Scores and results list Latvia's goal tally first, score column indicates score after each Tarasovs goal.

List of international goals scored by Igors Tarasovs
No.	Date	Venue	Opponent	Score	Result	Competition
1	10 October 2017	Skonto Stadium, Riga, Latvia	Andorra	4–0	4–0	2018 FIFA World Cup qualification
2	7 October 2020	Podgorica City Stadium, Podgorica, Montenegro	Montenegro	1–0	1–1	Friendly

== Honours ==
Skonto Riga

- Latvian Higher League: 2010
- Latvian Cup: 2010–11
- Baltic League: 2010–11

Ventspils

- Latvian Higher League: 2013
- Latvian Cup: 2012–13
