= 2011 Latvian Higher League =

Latvian football league season for the highest division

Latvian Higher League
- Season: 2011
- Champions: FK Ventspils
- Relegated: JFK Olimps/RFS
- Champions League: Ventspils
- Europa League: Metalurgs; Daugava; Skonto
- Baltic League: Ventspils; Metalurgs; Daugava; Skonto; FC Jūrmala
- Matches: 144
- Goals: 453 (3.15 per match)
- Top goalscorer: (Brazil) Nathan Júnior (22 goals)
- Biggest home win: Metalurgs 7–1 Olimps/RFS; Skonto 6–0 Olimps/RFS
- Biggest away win: Olimps/RFS 0–8 Ventspils
- Highest scoring: four matches, eight goals each
- Longest winning run: 8 matches Metalurgs
- Longest unbeaten run: 12 matches FK Ventspils
- Longest winless run: 21 matches JFK Olimps/RFS
- Longest losing run: 21 matches JFK Olimps/RFS

The 2011 Latvian Higher League (Latvian: Virslīga 2011) was the 20th season of top-tier football in Latvia. It began on 15 April 2011 and ended on 5 November 2011.

The competition was won by FK Ventspils, who thus qualified for the 2012–13 UEFA Champions League. Runners-up Liepājas Metalurgs and third-placed sides Daugava Daugavpils earned spots for the 2012–13 UEFA Europa League. On the bottom end of the table, JFK Olimps/RFS were relegated after losing their play-off series against Spartaks Jūrmala.

All nine clubs played every other club four times during the course of the season: twice at home and twice away. In addition, there will be no direct relegation to the Latvian First League this year.

== Teams ==
Jaunība Rīga finished the previous year's competition in tenth place and were relegated to the Latvian First League. This ended a one-year stay in the top flight. Promoted to the Higher League from the First Division automatically were the previous season's First Division champions, Gulbene 2005, who are taking part in the top flight for the first time in their history in 2011.

FC Tranzit finished 9th in the 2010 Higher League competition and were supposed to compete in a promotion/relegation playoff against the runners-up of the First Division, FC Jūrmala. However, before this playoff took place, Tranzit informed the Latvian Football Federation that they were forfeiting their place in the Higher League altogether, ending a two-year stay in the top flight. Therefore, FC Jūrmala were promoted to the Higher League automatically. Like Gulbene, they are competing in the top flight for the first time in their history in 2011.

Finally, SK Blāzma decided to withdraw from the league during the off-season. This ended a three-year stay in the top flight. At a meeting on 28 January 2011, the LFF decided that they would not be replaced in this year's competition.

=== Team summaries ===
Location of teams in the 2011 Latvian Higher League

Club	Location	Stadium	Capacity	Current manager
FC Daugava	Daugavpils	Daugava Stadium	4,500	(Russia) Leonid Nazarenko
Gulbene 2005	Gulbene	Gulbenes SC	1,500	(Latvia) Mihails Koņevs
FK Jelgava	Jelgava	Zemgales Olimpiskais Sporta Centrs	2,200	(Latvia) Dainis Kazakevičs
FC Jūrmala	Jūrmala	Slokas Stadium	5,000	(Latvia) Igors Stepanovs
FK Jūrmala-VV	Jūrmala	Slokas Stadium	5,000	(Latvia) Jurijs Popkovs
Metalurgs	Liepāja	Daugava Stadium	5,500	(Latvia) Vladimirs Osipovs
JFK Olimps/RFS	Riga	Daugava Stadium	6,000	(Georgia (country)) Tamaz Pertia
Skonto FC	Riga	Skonto Stadium	10,000	(Latvia) Marians Pahars
FK Ventspils	Ventspils	Olimpiskais Stadium	3,200	(Ukraine) Sergei Podpaly

== League table ==
Pos	Team	Pld	W	D	L	GF	GA	GD	Pts	Qualification or relegation
1	Ventspils (C)	32	22	5	5	75	19	+56	71	Qualification for Champions League second qualifying round
2	Liepājas Metalurgs	32	22	4	6	74	26	+48	70	Qualification for Europa League first qualifying round
3	Daugava Daugavpils	32	19	6	7	58	30	+28	63	Qualification for Europa League first qualifying round
4	Skonto	32	17	9	6	62	21	+41	60	Qualification for Europa League second qualifying round (Note: The winners of the 2011–12 Latvian Football Cup competition (Skonto Riga) qualified for the second qualifying round of UEFA Europa League.)
5	Jūrmala	32	12	8	12	45	42	+3	44	
6	Jelgava	32	13	4	15	47	54	−7	43	
7	FB Gulbene	32	7	7	18	39	67	−28	28	
8	Jūrmala-VV	32	5	6	21	34	75	−41	21	
9	Olimps/RFS (R)	32	1	3	28	19	117	−98	6	Qualification for relegation play-offs

Source: Latvian Football Federation (in Latvian)
Rules for classification: 1st points; 2nd head-to-head points; 3rd head-to-head goal difference; 4th overall wins; 5th goal difference; 6th goals scored
(C) Champions; (R) Relegated

== Results ==
=== First half of season ===
Home \ Away	DGD	GUL	JEL	FCJ	JVV	LIE	RFS	SKO	VEN
FC Daugava Daugavpils		3–1	1–1	1–1	1–0	2–1	2–0	1–1	0–3 (Note: This match originally ended 1-1. However, it was awarded to Ventspils as an 0–3 win because Daugava fielded an ineligible player.)
FB Gulbene	0–2 (Note: Match took place in Daugavpils. Placed as a Gulbene home match for organizational purposes.)		3–0	1–1	1–1	0–0	2–1	1–0	0–2
Jelgava	1–3	3–1		0–2	1–0	1–3	5–1	1–2	2–0
FC Jūrmala	0–2	4–1	1–1		0–2	1–3	4–0	1–2	0–1
FK Jūrmala-VV	1–3	5–3	2–3	3–1		0–5	2–1	0–4	0–3
SK Liepājas Metalurgs	2–0	1–2	0–1	1–0	4–1		4–1	0–1	0–0
Olimps/RFS	0–6	1–3	1–3	2–2	0–0	1–4		0–4	0–8
Skonto FC	1–1	2–1	4–0	0–1	2–0	0–2	4–0		1–3
Ventspils	2–1	4–0	4–0	4–0	4–0	0–1	4–0	0–1	

Source: Latvian Football Federation (in Latvian)
Legend: Blue = home team win; Yellow = draw; Red = away team win.

=== Second half of season ===
Home \ Away	DGD	GUL	JEL	FCJ	JVV	LIE	RFS	SKO	VEN
FC Daugava Daugavpils		2–1 (Note: Match took place in Gulbene. Placed as a Daugava home match for organizational purposes.)	2–1	3–0	2–1	0–1	2–0	0–0	1–1
FB Gulbene	2–4		2–3	0–2	4–1	0–1	3–0	1–1	0–3
Jelgava	1–2	3–0		0–2	4–1	3–2	2–1	1–4	1–2
FC Jūrmala	2–1	2–0	2–0		2–0	1–4	6–1	1–1	2–3
FK Jūrmala-VV	0–3 (Note: This match was cancelled and awarded to Daugava 0–3 due to Jurmala-VV being unable to field a team for the match.)	2–2	1–1	0–0		1–2	4–0	2–2	1–2
SK Liepājas Metalurgs	1–3	6–2	2–0	1–1	6–1		7–1	0–0	2–1
Olimps/RFS	1–3	1–1	1–3	1–2	2–1	0–3		0–7	1–6
Skonto FC	1–0	5–0	2–1	1–1	3–0	0–1	6–0		0–1
Ventspils	2–1	1–1	0–0	2–0	4–1	1–2	4–0	0–0	

Source: Latvian Football Federation (in Latvian)
Legend: Blue = home team win; Yellow = draw; Red = away team win.

=== Relegation play-offs ===
At the season's end, the 9th place club in the Latvian Higher League will face the runners-up of the Latvian First League in a two-legged playoff, with the winner being awarded a spot in the 2012 Higher League competition.

10 November 2011
16:00

Olimps/RFS	1–2	Spartaks
Blūms 72'		14' Rua; 21' Panasjuks

13 November 2011
14:00

Spartaks	2–0	Olimps/RFS
Budilovs 32'; Skalenko 49' (pen.)

== Top goalscorers ==
Source: LMT Virslīga 2011 (in Latvian)

Rank	Player	Club	Goals
1	(Brazil) Nathan Júnior	Skonto Riga	22
2	(Georgia (country)) Mamuka Ghonghadze	Daugava Daugavpils	21
3	(Latvia) Jurģis Kalns	Liepājas Metalurgs	16
3	(Latvia) Vladislavs Kozlovs	Jelgava	16
4	(Russia) Vadim Yanchuk	Ventspils	12
5	(Latvia) Vladimirs Kamešs	Liepājas Metalurgs	11

== Awards ==
=== Team of the Tournament ===
sportacentrs.com version:

Goalkeepers	Defenders	Midfielders	Forwards
(Latvia) Pāvels Šteinbors (Liepājas Metalurgs)	(Georgia (country)) Giorgi Chikradze (Daugava Daugavpils)	(Latvia) Valērijs Afanasjevs (Daugava Daugavpils)	(Brazil) Nathan Júnior (Skonto Riga)
(Latvia) Aleksandrs Vlasovs (Ventspils)	(Lithuania) Marius Činikas (Liepājas Metalurgs)	(Latvia) Oļegs Laizāns (Ventspils)	(Georgia (country)) Mamuka Ghonghadze (Daugava Daugavpils)
	(Russia) Evgeny Postnikov (Ventspils)	(Latvia) Aleksandrs Fertovs (Skonto Riga)	(Latvia) Vladislavs Kozlovs (Jelgava)	Coach: (Georgia (country)) Tamaz Pertia (Daugava Daugavpils/Olimps)
	(Nigeria) Daniel Ola (Jūrmala)	(Latvia) Genādijs Soloņicins (Liepājas Metalurgs)	(Latvia) Jurģis Kalns (Liepājas Metalurgs)
	(Russia) Georgi Ulyanov (Daugava Daugavpils)	(Russia) Konstantin Belov (Jūrmala)
	(Latvia) Ritvars Rugins (Ventspils)	(Latvia) Mihails Ziziļevs (Daugava Daugavpils)

Latvian Football Federation version:

Goalkeepers	Defenders	Midfielders	Forwards
(Latvia) Germans Māliņš (Skonto Riga)	(Latvia) Pāvels Surņins (Liepājas Metalurgs)	(Latvia) Valērijs Afanasjevs (Daugava Daugavpils)	(Brazil) Nathan Júnior (Skonto Riga)
(Latvia) Aleksandrs Vlasovs (Ventspils)	(Latvia) Antons Kurakins (Ventspils)	(Latvia) Ritvars Rugins (Ventspils)	(Russia) Vadim Yanchuk (Ventspils)
	(Russia) Evgeny Postnikov (Ventspils)	(Latvia) Aleksandrs Fertovs (Skonto Riga)	(Georgia (country)) Mamuka Ghonghadze (Daugava Daugavpils)	Coach: (Ukraine) Sergei Podpaly (Ventspils)
	(Nigeria) Daniel Ola (Jūrmala)	(Latvia) Andrejs Prohorenkovs (Liepājas Metalurgs)	(Latvia) Vladislavs Kozlovs (Jelgava)
	(Latvia) Pāvels Mihadjuks (Liepājas Metalurgs)	(Latvia) Oļegs Laizāns (Ventspils)
	(Latvia) Igors Savčenkovs (Ventspils)	(Lithuania) Tomas Tamošauskas (Liepājas Metalurgs)
	(Latvia) Vladislavs Gabovs (Ventspils)	(Russia) Eduard Sukhanov (Ventspils)
	(Lithuania) Marius Činikas (Liepājas Metalurgs)	(Latvia) Jurģis Kalns (Liepājas Metalurgs)

=== Individual nominations ===
Players selected by sportacentrs.com:

Best foreign player: (Nigeria) Daniel Ola (Jūrmala)

Best young player (U-21): (Latvia) (Armenia) Arevshat Khachatryan (Gulbene)

Best coach: (Georgia (country)) Tamaz Pertia (Daugava Daugavpils/ Olimps/RFS)

Surprise of the season: (Latvia) Oļegs Laizāns (Ventspils)

Player of the season: (Latvia) Jurģis Kalns (Liepājas Metalurgs)

Players selected by LFF:

Best goalkeeper: (Latvia) Germans Māliņš (Skonto Riga)

Best defender: (Latvia) Pāvels Mihadjuks (Liepājas Metalurgs)

Best midfielder: (Latvia) Oļegs Laizāns (Ventspils)

Best forward: (Brazil) Nathan Júnior (Skonto Riga)

Best coach: (Ukraine) Sergei Podpaly (Ventspils)

Top scorer: (Brazil) Nathan Júnior (Skonto Riga) (22 goals)

Best young player (U-21): (Latvia) Valērijs Šabala (Skonto Riga)

Player of the season: (Latvia) Oļegs Laizāns (Ventspils)

== Team awards ==
Players selected by LFF:

Best match organization:Jelgava

Fair-play award:Gulbene
