= Yōsuke Saitō =

Japanese footballer

Yosuke Saito
Personal information
- Full name: Yōsuke Saitō
- Date of birth: April 7, 1988 (age 38)
- Place of birth: Tokyo, Japan
- Height: 1.74 m (5 ft 8 1/2 in)
- Position: Forward

Youth career
- 2004–2006: Yokohama F. Marinos

Senior career*
Years	Team	Apps	(Gls)
2007–2010	Yokohama F. Marinos	12	(0)
2010	Zweigen Kanazawa	9	(4)
2011	Albirex Niigata Singapore	26	(8)
2012	Gulbene	14	(9)
2012	Ventspils	17	(6)
2013	Ufa	10	(1)
2014	Slutsk	17	(7)
2016	Riga FC	15	(5)
2017	Essendon Royals	7	(3)
2017	Sunshine George Cross	10	(3)
2018	Viljandi Tulevik	9	(2)
- * Club domestic league appearances and goals as of 1 May 2018

Yosuke Saito (斎藤 陽介, Saitō Yōsuke; born April 7, 1988) is a Japanese former football player who last played for Estonian Meistriliiga club Viljandi Tulevik.

== Club career ==
=== Latvia ===
Before the start of the 2012 Latvian Higher League season Saito signed a contract with FB Gulbene. Soon after joining he made a great impact, scoring all of his team's goals in the first round of the championship. All in all he scored 9 goals in 14 matches for Gulbene and was the club's leading scorer. In June 2012 Saito went on trial with the Azerbaijan Premier League club Khazar Lankaran, but he wasn't offered a contract then. On July 1, 2012 he signed a contract with the Latvian Higher League club FK Ventspils. Scoring 6 goals in 17 matches for Ventspils, all in all, Saito became the second top-scorer of the Latvian Higher League in 2012 with 15 goals in 31 matches.

=== FC Ufa ===
After the successful season in Ventspils Saito moved to the Russian National Football League club FC Ufa in February 2013.

=== Viljandi Tulevik ===
On 23 February 2018, Saitō signed a contract with Estonian Meistriliiga club Viljandi Tulevik. On 1 May 2018 he left the club due to family reasons.

== Club statistics ==
Club performance			League		Cup		League Cup		Total	
Season	Club	League	Apps	Goals	Apps	Goals	Apps	Goals	Apps	Goals
Japan			League		Emperor's Cup		League Cup		Total	
2007	Yokohama F. Marinos	J1 League	11	0	1	0	3	1	15	1
2008	Yokohama F. Marinos	J1 League	1	0	0	0	2	0	3	0
2009	Yokohama F. Marinos	J1 League	0	0	0	0	0	0	0	0
2010	Yokohama F. Marinos	J1 League	0	0	0	0	0	0	0	0
2010	Zweigen Kanazawa	Football League	9	4	0	0	-		9	4
Total			21	4	1	0	5	1	27	5
