= Vladimirs Kamešs =

Latvian footballer

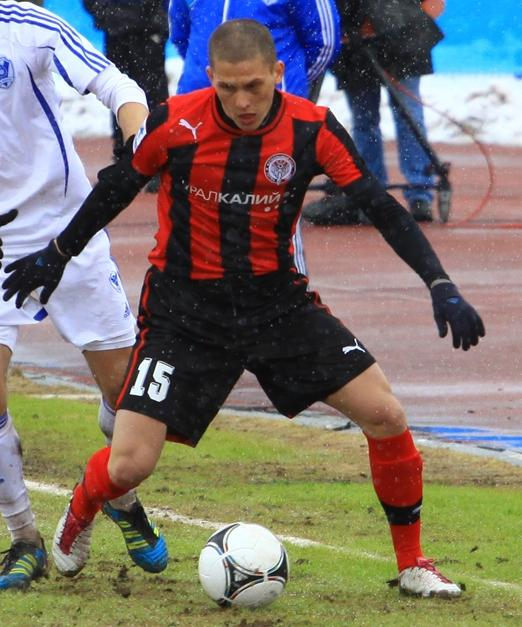
- Kamešs with Amkar Perm in 2013

Personal information
- Full name: Vladimirs Kamešs
- Date of birth: 28 October 1988 (age 38)
- Place of birth: Liepāja, Latvian SSR, Soviet Union (now Republic of Latvia)
- Height: 1.81 m (5 ft 11 1/2 in)
- Positions: Midfielder; forward

Team information
- Current team: Elverum
- Number: 33

Youth career
- Liepājas Metalurgs

Senior career*
Years	Team	Apps	(Gls)
2005–2012	Liepājas Metalurgs	86	(25)
2010	→ Gulbene 2005 (loan)	11	(10)
2013–2015	Amkar Perm	17	(0)
2014	→ Neftekhimik Nizhnekamsk (loan)	10	(1)
2015	Pogoń Szczecin	6	(0)
2015–2016	Liepāja	25	(7)
2016–2018	Yenisey Krasnoyarsk	58	(12)
2018	Liepāja	7	(2)
2019	SKA-Khabarovsk	13	(1)
2019	Riga	7	(0)
2020	Chayka Peschanokopskoye	1	(0)
2020–2023	Riga	71	(6)
2023–	Elverum	53	(9)

International career
2006	Latvia U19		
2007–2010	Latvia U21	13	(2)
2012–2021	Latvia	43	(3)
- * Club domestic league appearances and goals as of 27 October 2024

Vladimirs Kamešs (born 28 October 1988) is a Latvian footballer who plays as a left winger for Norwegian club Elverum.

== Club career ==
=== Early career ===
Born in Liepāja, as a youth player Kamešs played for his local club Liepājas Metalurgs, coming through all age groups of the academy. In January 2005, at the age of 16, Kamešs was taken to the club's first team. He saw himself scoring in the first and only appearance he made that season, helping his team become the Latvian Higher League champions. Even though, Kamešs helped his team win the Latvian Football Cup in 2006, triumph in the Baltic League in 2007 and become the champions of Latvia once again in 2009, he did not play much. During 5 seasons the young player made only 28 league appearances, scoring 4 goals due to the fact that more experienced players were more likely to be chosen to play over him.

=== Gulbene-2005 ===
In July 2010 Kamešs was loaned out to the Latvian First League club FB Gulbene-2005 in order to have a chance to play more. Surprisingly, the young player, netted 10 goals in 11 league appearances. He became the club's top scorer, helping them win the Latvian First League championship and clinch a promotion to the Latvian Higher League. Later that year he was also named the best player of the Latvian First League by the Latvian Football Federation.

=== Return to Liepāja ===
After the end of his loan spell Kamešs returned to Liepājas Metalurgs to start the upcoming season with them. Evidently, the player had progressed and found himself in the starting line-up all throughout the season. Kamešs scored 11 goals in 29 league matches, becoming the 5th top-scorer of the season. The 2012 season saw Kamešs as one of the club's key players, as he was a constant first eleven player, making 29 league appearances and scoring 10 goals. Even though Metalurgs finished the season in the 4th position, Kamešs was named the best player of the league in October and November. After the season, he was also included in both – sportacentrs.com and LFF teams of the tournament, receiving the awards as the best midfielder of the season and the best player of the season in general.

=== Amkar Perm ===
In February 2013 Kamešs went on trial with the Russian Premier League club Amkar Perm. Participating in two of their pre-season training camps, in Turkey and Bulgaria, he signed a two-and-a-half-year deal with them on 18 February. He chose to play with the no. 15 jersey.

=== Pogoń Szczecin ===
In February 2015, Kamešs left Amkar Perm by mutual consent, going on to sign for Pogoń Szczecin, which plays in the top tier of Polish football, the Ekstraklasa.

== International career ==
From 2006 to 2010 Vladimirs Kamešs was a member of Latvia U-19 and Latvia U-21. He made his full international debut for Latvia on 22 May 2012 in a 1–0 friendly match loss against Poland, coming on as a substitute in the 73rd minute and replacing Ivans Lukjanovs. He helped his team win the Baltic Cup, taking place in Võru, Estonia from 1 to 3 June 2012. Kamešs scored his first international goal for Latvia on 16 October 2012 in a 2–0 2014 FIFA World Cup qualification victory over Liechtenstein.

=== International goals ===
Scores and results list Latvia's goal tally first.

No.	Date	Venue	Opponent	Score	Result	Competition
1.	16 October 2012	Skonto Stadium, Riga, Latvia	Liechtenstein	1–0	2–0	2014 FIFA World Cup qualification
2.	15 October 2019	Turner Stadium, Be'er Sheva, Israel	Israel	1–2	1–3	UEFA Euro 2020 qualification
3.	14 November 2020	Daugava Stadium, Riga, Latvia	Faroe Islands	1–0	1–1	2020–21 UEFA Nations League

== Interesting ==
Kamešs is on the cover of the 2012 Latvian Higher League year-book published in February 2013.

== Honours ==
Liepājas Metalurgs

- Latvian Higher League: 2005, 2009
- Latvian Cup: 2006
- Baltic League: 2007

Gulbene-2005

- Latvian First League: 2010

Liepāja

- Latvian Higher League: 2015

Riga

- Latvian Higher League: 2020

Individual

- Latvian Higher League Best Player: 2010, 2012
- Latvian Higher League Best Midfielder: 2010

Latvia

- Baltic Cup: 2012
