= 2010 Latvian First League =

Latvian football league season for 2nd division

Latvian First League
- Season: 2010
- Champions: FB Gulbene 2005
- Promoted: FB Gulbene 2005; FC Jūrmala
- Relegated: FK Kuldīga
- Matches: 132
- Goals: 462 (3.5 per match)
- Top goalscorer: Dāvis Ikaunieks (17)
- Biggest home win: FK Daugava/RFS 11–0 FK Kuldīga
- Biggest away win: FK Kuldīga 0–10 SK Liepājas Metalurgs-2
- Highest scoring: FK Daugava/RFS 11–0 FK Kuldīga

2010 Latvian First League (Latvian: Latvijas Pirmā Līga 2010) was the 19th season of top-tier football in Latvia. It began on 1 May 2010 and ended on 6 November 2010.

== League table ==
Pos	Team	Pld	W	D	L	GF	GA	GD	Pts	Promotion or relegation
1	FB Gulbene (P)	22	21	1	0	85	14	+71	64	Promotion to Latvian Higher League
2	FC Jūrmala (P)	22	14	4	4	47	19	+28	46	Qualification for promotion playoffs
3	Daugava/RFS Riga	22	13	5	4	51	27	+24	44	
4	Liepājas Metalurgs-2	22	13	4	5	55	31	+24	43	
5	METTA/LU	22	10	6	6	42	25	+17	36	
6	Valmieras FK	22	9	4	9	33	40	−7	31	
7	Daugava-2 Daugavpils	22	7	3	12	28	35	−7	24	
8	Auda	22	6	6	10	21	33	−12	24	
9	Spartaks Jūrmala	22	6	4	12	32	41	−9	22	
10	Tukums 2000	22	4	7	11	33	46	−13	19	
11	Jelgava-2	22	4	3	15	21	42	−21	15	
12	Kuldīga (R)	22	1	1	20	14	109	−95	4	Relegation to Latvian Second League

Source: Latvian Football Federation; RSSSF
Rules for classification: 1) points; 2) goal difference; 3) number of goals scored.
(P) Promoted; (R) Relegated

== Results ==
Home \ Away	D2D	GUL	FCJ	AUD	DRI	KUL	JEL	VAL	SPJ	TUK	MLU	LM2
Daugava-2 Daugavpils		0–2	2–2	2–1	1–2	7–1	5–0	1–2	3–2	1–0	0–2	0–3
FB Gulbene	2–0		3–2	5–0	6–0	9–0	6–1	5–1	5–0	5–2	2–0	6–2
FC Jūrmala	4–0	0–1		2–1	1–3	3–1	1–0	3–0	2–0	3–2	5–1	4–1
Auda	1–0	0–3	0–0		1–4	4–1	0–1	0–2	1–1	2–2	0–0	2–0
Daugava/RFS Riga	2–0	1–1	0–1	3–1		11–0	1–0	5–0	2–1	1–1	3–2	2–2
Kuldīga	2–1	0–5	0–3	0–2	2–2		0–5	0–3	1–2	1–5	0–5	0–10
Jelgava-2	0–1	3–7	0–5	0–1	0–1	7–1		1–0	1–1	1–1	0–1	0–4
Valmieras FK	2–1	0–1	1–1	0–0	3–1	5–2	2–0		3–1	2–1	0–3	1–1
Spartaks Jūrmala	1–1	0–3	1–2	1–2	1–3	4–1	1–0	6–1		1–0	0–0	1–3
Tukums 2000	1–1	0–4	1–1	1–1	1–3	3–1	2–1	3–2	1–5		0–0	3–4
METTA/LU	0–1	2–3	0–2	2–0	2–1	8–0	0–0	2–2	3–1	3–1		3–1
Liepājas Metalurgs-2	3–0	0–1	1–0	3–1	0–0	5–0	1–0	2–1	3–1	3–2	3–3	

Source: Latvian Football Federation; RSSSF
Legend: Blue = home team win; Yellow = draw; Red = away team win.

== Top goalscorers ==
17 goals

- (Latvia) Dāvis Ikaunieks (Liepājas Metalurgs-2)

15 goals

- (Russia) Vjačeslavs Seleckis (Jūrmala)

13 goals

- (Latvia) Ruslans Agafonovs (FK Daugava/RFS)

12 goals

- (Latvia) Vladimirs Kamešs (Gulbene)

11 goals

- (Latvia) Ivans Sputajs (Gulbene)
- (Latvia) Maksims Daņilovs (Jūrmala)

10 goals

- (Japan) Minori Sato (Gulbene)

* Players in italics left the clubs they are listed in during the season.
