= Iidle Elmi =

Somali-born Finnish footballer (born 1995)

Personal information
- Full name: Iidle Muhamed Elmi
- Date of birth: 1 January 1995 (age 31)
- Place of birth: Somalia
- Height: 1.75 m (5 ft 9 in)
- Position: Striker

Youth career
- 2009–2012: FF Jaro

Senior career*
Years	Team	Apps	(Gls)
2011–2014	FF Jaro	40	(0)
2011, 2014	→ JBK (loan)	21	(5)
2015	FB Gulbene		
2016	FC YPA	21	(4)

International career^{‡}
2013	Finland U-19		
2014	Finland U-20		
- * Club domestic league appearances and goals as of 8 August 2017 ‡ National team caps and goals as of 8 August 2017

Iidle Elmi (born 1 January 1995) is a Somali born Finnish footballer who last played for FC YPA in the Finnish third tier Kakkonen. He has previously played for FF Jaro in the Finnish top division Veikkausliiga and for FB Gulbene in the Latvian Virsliga.

== Career ==
Elmi joined the FF Jaro junior squad in 2009. He signed a three-year contract with Jaro's first team in January 2011. In 2013, he received Finnish citizenship. In 2015 he was signed by the Latvian side FB Gulbene, but the club was expelled from the top league and their results expunged on suspicion of match-fixing. Elmi returned Finland for the next season.
