= Mihails Ziziļevs =

Latvian footballer

Personal information
- Full name: Mihails Ziziļevs
- Date of birth: 27 December 1973 (age 52)
- Place of birth: Daugavpils, Latvian SSR, Soviet Union (now Republic of Latvia)
- Height: 1.76 m (5 ft 9 1/2 in)
- Position: Midfielder

Senior career*
Years	Team	Apps	(Gls)
1992	DJSS Daugavpils	19	(2)
1993–1994	Auseklis Daugavpils	39	(0)
1995	Vilan-D Daugavpils	27	(3)
1996–1999	Dinaburg	101	(7)
2000–2001	Rubin Kazan	65	(5)
2001	Dinaburg	3	(0)
2002	Liepājas Metalurgs	5	(0)
2002	Ventspils	8	(0)
2003	Metallurg Lipetsk	34	(1)
2004	Luch-Energiya	34	(2)
2005	Dinaburg	26	(8)
2006–2008	Ventspils	71	(7)
2009	Dinaburg	17	(0)
2010–2013	Daugava	90	(6)
2014	Klaipėdos Granitas	25	(0)

International career^{‡}
1997–2001	Latvia	2	(0)
- * Club domestic league appearances and goals as of 6 November 2014 ‡ National team caps and goals as of 6 November 2014

Mihails Ziziļevs (born 27 December 1973) is a Latvian football midfielder who currently plays for FK Klaipėdos Granitas in the Lithuanian A Lyga.

== Playing career ==
Ziziļevs started his career at his local club DJSS Daugavpils in the early 1990s. Until 2000 he played in his hometown, but then got an offer from Russian Premier League club Rubin Kazan. After two seasons in Russia Ziziļevs came back to Daugavpils and joined its local club Dinaburg FC. After a few seasons in Latvia Ziziļevs moved back to Russia, where he played for Metallurg Lipetsk and later also Luch-Energiya Vladivostok. Afterwards Ziziļevs came back to Dinaburg FC once more and after a very successful season he joined FK Ventspils, where playing for 3 seasons, he helped the club win the Latvian Higher League in 2006. In 2010 Ziziļevs joined FC Daugava. In 2012, as the club's captain, he helped Daugava win the Latvian Higher League for the first time in the club's history. In 2013 they also lifted the first ever Latvian Supercup. On 6 April 2013 Ziziļevs played his 400th game in the Latvian Higher League and was locally referred to as the Latvian Ryan Giggs. In March 2014, when his contract with Daugava had expired, Ziziļevs moved to the Lithuanian A Lyga side FK Klaipėdos Granitas to continue his professional footballer's career, at the time being 40 years old.

== Awards ==
- Champion of Latvia - 2006, 2007, 2008, 2012
- Latvian Cup winner - 2007
- Latvian Supercup winner - 2013
