= Kateryna Polovinchuk =

Ukrainian pool player (born 1995)

Personal information
- Born: 24 November 1995 (age 30) Kyiv

Pool career
- Country: Ukraine
- Pool games: eight-ball, nine-ball, ten-ball, straight pool

Kateryna Polovinchuk (Ukrainian: Катерина Ігорівна Половинчук; born 24 November 1995 in Kyiv) is a Ukrainian professional pool player. She has won Ukrainian national championships across different disciplines 20 times, and in 2016 she was runner-up in the European Eight-ball Championship.

== Career ==
=== Pool ===
Kateryna Polovinchuk was born on 24 November 1995. In June 2010, she became Ukrainian junior champion in all four disciplines (Straight pool, Eight-ball, Nine-ball, Ten-ball). In December 2010, Polovyntschuk beat Viktorija Nahorna 6-3 and became Ukrainian champion for the first time, shortly after her 15th birthday.

In 2011, she won all four titles at the Ukrainian Junior Championship.

In 2012, she was again four times national junior champion. At the 2012 Ukrainian championship, she won the straight pool with a 75–55 final victory over Viktorija Nahorna. In nine-Ball she defended her title with a 7–1 final victory against Alina Holubjewa. Polovinchuk won in three disciplines at the 2013 Ukrainian Junior Championship. However, she lost the 10-ball final to Ljubow Schyhailowa. At the Ukrainian championship in 2013 she won the titles in straight pool, ten-ball, and for the third consecutive year in nine-ball. When she last participated in the Ukrainian Junior Championship, in 2014, she won all four championship titles for the fourth time. In late 2014, she became Ukrainian champion in straight pool and eight-ball after final victories against Ljubow Schyhailowa. In December 2015. she became Ukrainian champion in all disciplines, winning in all four finals against Viktorija Nahorna.

At the 2016 European Pool Championships, Polovinchuk reached the final in eight-ball, in which she lost 3–6 to Kristina Tkach 3–6 despite having taken a 3–1 lead.

In September 2017, she won the Kaunas Open with a 7–1 final victory against the Lithuanian Evaldas Sutkus. She later reached the semi-finals at the Klagenfurt Open and was eliminated against Chen Siming. At the 2017 Ukrainian Championship, she took part in three of the four competitions and reached the final three times, each time meeting Daryna Sirantschuk. After Polovinchuk had become Ukrainian champion endlessly for the sixth time in a row in straight pool and for the fourth time in a row in eight-ball, she lost 6–7 in the nine-ball final.

=== Snooker ===
In December 2014, Polovinchuk became Ukrainian champion, with a 3–2 final victory over Daryna Sirantschuk.

=== Personal life ===
Polovinchuk studied at the Economics and Business Faculty of Mykolas Romeris University, graduating at the top of her class in January 2019.

== Achievements ==
Source: tournamentservice.net (unless otherwise stated)

=== Pool ===
==== European – youth ====
- Nine-ball European Youth Champion (women): 2013

==== National Championships – girls ====
- Ukrainian Eight-ball champion (girls): 2010, 2011, 2012, 2013, 2014
- Ukrainian Nine-ball champion (girls): 2010, 2011, 2012, 2013, 2014
- Ukrainian Ten-ball champion (girls): 2010, 2011, 2012, 2014
- Ukrainian Straight pool champion (girls): 2010, 2011, 2012, 2013, 2014

==== National Championships – women ====
- Ukrainian Eight-ball champion (women): 2010, 2011, 2014, 2015, 2016, 2017
- Ukrainian Nine-ball champion: 2011, 2012, 2013, 2015, 2019
- Ukrainian Ten-ball champion (women): 2011, 2013, 2015
- Ukrainian Straight pool champion (women): 2012, 2013, 2014, 2015, 2016, 2017

==== Other ====
- Mezz Cues Baltic Pool League 2016 Stage IV (women)
- Kaunas Open – women & seniors: 2017
- Mezz Cues Baltic Pool League 2018 stage I (women)
- Pro Cup II stage (B category): 2018
- Mezz Cues Baltic Pool League 2018 stage II (women)
- Kaunas Open 2018 (Seniors)
- Mezz Cues Baltic Pool League 2018 stage IV (women)
- 2019 Tete-a-Tete Casino Cup (veteran women)

=== Snooker ===
- Ukrainian champion : 2014
