= Vitālijs Maksimenko =

Latvian footballer (born 1990)

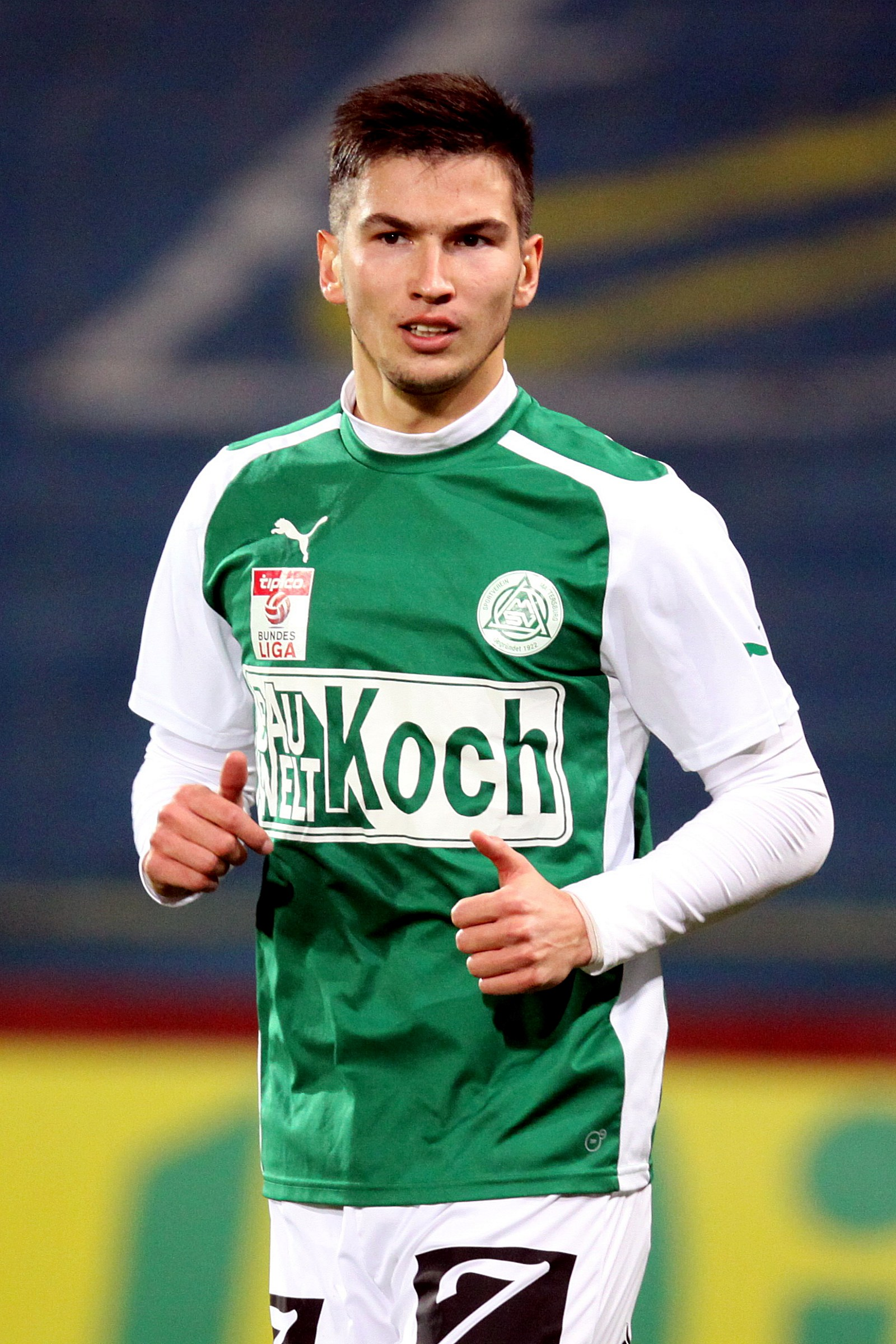
- Maksimenko playing for SV Mattersburg in 2015

Personal information
- Full name: Vitālijs Maksimenko
- Date of birth: 8 December 1990 (age 35)
- Place of birth: Riga, Latvian SSR, Soviet Union
- Height: 1.86 m (6 ft 1 in)
- Position: Centre-back

Youth career
- 1996–2003: JFC Skonto
- 2003–2007: Daugava 90

Senior career*
Years	Team	Apps	(Gls)
2008–2009	Daugava Rīga	9	(0)
2009	→ CSKA Moscow (loan)	0	(0)
2010–2012	Skonto Riga	76	(2)
2013–2015	Brighton & Hove Albion	1	(0)
2013	→ Yeovil Town (loan)	3	(0)
2014	→ Kilmarnock (loan)	8	(1)
2014–2015	→ VVV-Venlo (loan)	21	(0)
2015	FK Liepāja	2	(1)
2015–2017	SV Mattersburg	37	(0)
2017–2018	Bruk-Bet Termalica Nieciecza	17	(1)
2018–2020	Olimpija Ljubljana	42	(2)
2020	Omiya Ardija	17	(0)
2021	Olimpija Ljubljana	9	(0)
2022	RFS	17	(0)
2023–2024	Aiolikos	15	(0)

International career^{‡}
2008–2009	Latvia U19	6	(0)
2010–2012	Latvia U21	17	(0)
2013–2024	Latvia	54	(1)
- * Club domestic league appearances and goals as of 11 January 2025 ‡ National team caps and goals as of 11 January 2025

Vitālijs Maksimenko (born 8 December 1990) is a Latvian former professional footballer who played as a centre-back. He made his international debut for Latvia in 2013, earning over 50 appearances.

== Club career ==
=== Early career ===
As a youth player Vitālijs Maksimenko was a member of his local club – Skonto Riga Academy. At the age of 13 he moved to Daugava 90. In 2008 Maksimenko was taken to the club's first team Daugava Rīga. That year they became champions of the Latvian First League. Maksimenko made his first team debut in 2009. In mid-season, with nine Latvian Higher League appearances, Maksimenko went on for trials with the Russian Premier League clubs Lokomotiv Moscow and CSKA Moscow. CSKA signed him on loan until the end of the season. He played several matches for the club's reserves.

=== Skonto Riga ===
At the start of 2010 Maksimenko began training with the Latvian Higher League club Skonto Riga. Leaving a good impression, he signed a contract with the club on 15 March 2010. Playing 25 matches in his debut season, Maksimenko helped Skonto become the champions of the Latvian Higher League. In 2011 they became the champions of Baltic League, and won the Latvian Football Cup in 2012. Skonto finished the 2012 season as the runners-up of the league, with Maksimenko being included in both – Latvian Football Federation and sportacentrs.com teams of the tournament. He was also named the best defender of the season, and later on voted as the best Skonto Riga player of the season.

=== Brighton and Hove Albion ===
At the end of 2012 Maksimenko went on trial with the English Football League Championship club Brighton & Hove Albion. In spite of interest from other Football League Championship and Premier League clubs, he signed a two-and-a-half-year contract deal with the Seagulls on 5 January 2013, being added to the development squad. He made his only league appearance for Brighton in a 2–1 defeat to Derby County in August 2013.

==== Yeovil (loan) ====
On 18 March 2013, Maksimenko joined Football League One side Yeovil Town on a one-month loan deal. Maksimenko made his Yeovil and Football League debut as a second-half substitute in a 1–0 defeat against Oldham Athletic, on 16 April 2013. On 20 May 2013, Maksimenko appeared as a second-half substitute in the 2013 League One play-off final as Yeovil beat Brentford to earn promotion to the Championship. Maksimenko returned to Brighton having appeared four times for Yeovil.

==== Kilmarnock (loan) ====
On 24 January 2014, Maksimenko joined Scottish Premiership club Kilmarnock on a loan deal lasting till the end of the 2013–14 Scottish Premiership season. He scored his only goal for Kilmarnock in a 2–1 defeat to Partick Thistle.

==== VVV-Venlo (loan) ====
On 1 September 2014, it was announced that Maksimenko was sent on loan to Dutch Eerste Divisie side VVV-Venlo until the end of the season.

=== Bruk-Bet Termalica Nieciecza ===
On 30 June 2017 he signed a contract with a Polish club named Bruk-Bet Termalica Nieciecza.

== International career ==
Maksimenko has been a member of Latvian under-19 and under-21 levels. On 15 August 2012 he was firstly called from the Latvia national football team for a friendly match against Montenegro. Maksimenko made his full international debut on 6 February 2013 in a 3–0 friendly match defeat against Japan, coming on as a substitute in the 72nd minute and replacing Vladimirs Kamešs.

=== International goals ===
Score and Result list Latvia's goal tally first

No.	Date	Venue	Opponent	Score	Result	Competition	Ref.
1.	31 March 2015	Arena Lviv, Lviv, Ukraine	Ukraine	1–1	1–1	Friendly	

== Honours ==
Skonto Riga

- Latvian Higher League: 2010
- Baltic League: 2010–11
- Latvian Cup: 2011–12

Yeovil Town

- Football League One play-offs: 2013

Olimpija Ljubljana

- Slovenian Cup: 2018–19, 2020–21

Individual

- Best defender of Latvian Higher League: 2012
- Skonto Riga Player of the Season: 2012
