= New Project FC =

- Founded: 2017
- Ground: RTU Stadium
- Capacity: 250
- Owner: Jurijs Altenburgs
- Sponsor: (Sponsored by Adidas)
- Manager: Alexander Osin
- League: Latvian First League
- Website: https://lff.lv/klubi/fc-new-project-12144/?cid=3673856 Official website
Home colors	Away colors

FC New Project (founded 2017) is a Latvian football club from Riga. In the 2019 season, the club's adult team participated in the Latvian First League.

== Sponsors ==
The club is sponsored by Adidas as their main, technical sponsor, with numerous local Latvian broadcasting networks also supporting the team.

== Championship History ==
- 2019 — Round of 16
- 8th place — Latvia's 1st League 2019

== Roster ==
=== Players ===
Source: Note: Flags indicate national team as defined under FIFA eligibility rules; some limited exceptions apply. Players may hold more than one non-FIFA nationality.

No.	Pos.	Nation	Player
—	GK	(Latvia) LVA	Igors Labuts
—	GK	(Latvia) LVA	Daniels Mišins
—	GK	(Latvia) LVA	Aivis Poklikajevs
—	GK	(Latvia) LVA	Glebs Suranovs
—	DF	(Latvia) LVA	Viktors Baikovs
—	DF	(Latvia) LVA	Dainis Bečs
—	DF	(Latvia) LVA	Andrejs Lebedevs
—	DF	(Latvia) LVA	Ruslans Purinš
—	DF	(Latvia) LVA	Martinš Sipols
—	DF	(Latvia) LVA	Grigorijs Stepanuks
—	DF	(Latvia) LVA	Igors Škirjatovs
—	MF	(Latvia) LVA	Mihails Bobrovs
—	MF	(Latvia) LVA	Oskars Ikstens
—	MF	(Latvia) LVA	Pavels Kočetkovs
—	MF	(Latvia) LVA	Aleksejs Lavrenovs

No.	Pos.	Nation	Player
—	MF	(Latvia) LVA	Ingus Makovskis
—	MF	(Latvia) LVA	Maksims Mokrušins
—	MF	(Latvia) LVA	Maksims Neverovskis
—	MF	(Ukraine) UKR	Ievgenii Prokopov
—	MF	(Latvia) LVA	Artūrs Rucko
—	MF	(Latvia) LVA	Lavrentijs Šarovs
—	MF	(Latvia) LVA	Eriks Šilings
—	FW	(Colombia) COL	Carlos Andres Amaya Romero
—	FW	(Latvia) LVA	Valerijs Čistjakovs
—	FW	(France) FRA	Kurs Clary Kouma
—	FW	(Latvia) LVA	Germans Matjušenko
—	FW	(Latvia) LVA	Marks Molčamovs
—	FW	(Latvia) LVA	Romans Šimanovskis
—	FW	(Latvia) LVA	Vitalijs Zils

== Exclusion ==
On October 30, 2019, the Disciplinary Commission of the Latvian Football Federation decided to exclude FC New Project from participation in the 1st league championship and give them a 200 euro fine, after an unlicensed player entered the field using another player's identity in an October 19 game against FK Auda. However, on 29 November 2019 after the club appealed the exclusion, the LFF Board of Appeal annulled the decision of the Disciplinary Board to exclude FC New Project which meant that FC New Project could qualify for the 2020 League 1 championship. In the unplayed games, a technical loss of 0-3 was awarded (because the decision of the Disciplinary Committee was in force at that time). The disqualification of FC New Project head coach Alexander Osin was maintained until October 30, 2020.
