= Vadims Gospodars =

Ukrainian-born Latvian footballer

Personal information
- Full name: Vadims Gospodars
- Date of birth: 25 December 1983 (age 42)
- Place of birth: Kryvyi Rih, Ukrainian SSR
- Height: 1.83 m (6 ft 0 in)
- Position: Centre midfielder

Youth career
- Skonto Rīga

Senior career*
| Years | Team | Apps | (Gls) |
| 2000–2002 | Skonto Rīga | 1 | (0) |
| 2003–2004 | Lada Togliatti | 24 | (0) |
| 2005 | Venta | 13 | (0) |
| 2006–2007 | Mika Yerevan | 3 | (0) |
| 2008–2009 | FK Jūrmala | 29 | (4) |
| 2009–2010 | Vitebsk | 42 | (1) |
| 2011 | FC Jūrmala | 25 | (9) |
| 2012–2013 | Daugava Rīga | 34 | (2) |
| 2013 | Neman Grodno | 0 | (0) |
| 2013 | AC Kajaani | 10 | (2) |
| 2015 | Caramba/Dinamo Rīga | | |

International career^{‡}
| 2000 | Latvia U17 | 2 | (0) |
| 2000–2001 | Latvia U19 | 3 | (0) |
| 2002–2004 | Latvia U21 | 7 | (0) |
- * Club domestic league appearances and goals as of 2 June 2015 ‡ National team caps and goals as of 30 November 2013

Vadims Gospodars (born 25 December 1983) is a Ukrainian-born Latvian former football midfielder. He started his club career in 2000. Gospodars has been awarded with several honours since his debut, including the Latvian cup and the Armenian Supercup.

== Club career ==
Being born in Ukraine, Vadims Gospodars moved to Latvia as a child and started playing football at Skonto FC academy. He was taken to the first team in 2000, but in a period of three seasons only made 1 appearance for the club. In 2003 Gospodars moved to the Russian First Division club Lada Togliatti. Playing regularly, he could not help the team avoid relegation to the Russian Second Division and left the club at the start of 2004. In 2005 Gospodars joined the newly founded Latvian Higher League club FK Venta. After the half of the season the club suffered a financial crisis, the first team players were let go and the season was finished in the last 8th position of the league table, playing with the youth squad. Afterwards, the club was dissolved and Gospodars moved to the Armenian Premier League club FC Mika at the start of 2006. He played a few matches in the first team but was mostly used in the reserves. In 2008 Gospodars moved back to the Latvian Higher League and signed a contract with FK Jūrmala, soon becoming a first team regular. He played there for one and a half seasons, moving to the Belarusian Premier League club FC Vitebsk in July 2009. He played 42 league matches and scored 1 goal till January 2011. Before the start of the 2011 Latvian Higher League season Gospodars joined FC Jūrmala. He scored 9 goals in 25 league matches during the season and became his team's second best scorer after the forward Vīts Rimkus, who scored 10 goals. Before the start of the 2012 season Gospodars moved to Daugava Rīga, where as one of the most experienced players he was elected to be the club's captain. Daugava finished the season in the 9th position of the table but managed to secure a place in the Higher League via promotion-relegation play-offs, winning the Latvian First League runners-up BFC Daugava 4-1 on aggregate. One goal in the play-offs was also scored by Gospodars. In March 2013 Gospodars moved to the Belarusian Premier League club Neman Grodno, but did not play a single match. In August 2013 he joined the Finnish Ykkönen club AC Kajaani.

== International career ==
Gospodars was a member of Latvia U-17, Latvia U-19 and Latvia U-21 football teams, but has not played for the senior side yet.
