= Germans Māliņš =

Latvian footballer (born 1987)

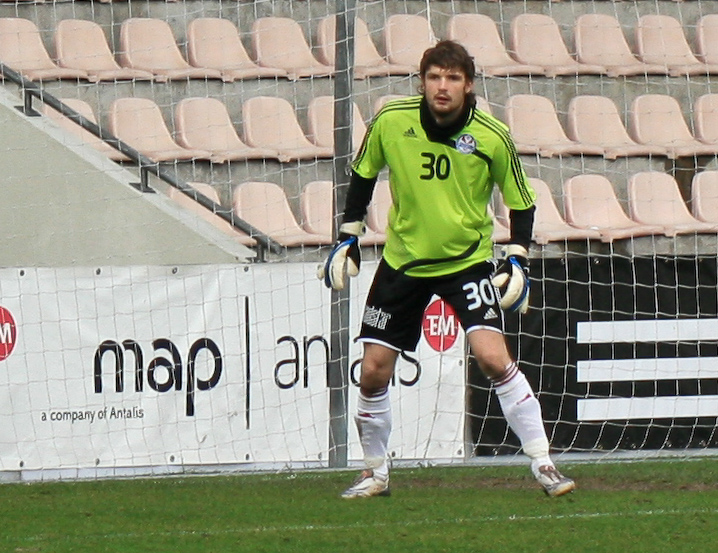

Personal information
- Full name: Germans Māliņš
- Date of birth: 12 October 1987 (age 39)
- Place of birth: Riga, Latvian SSR, Soviet Union (now Republic of Latvia)
- Height: 1.87 m (6 ft 1 1/2 in)
- Position: Goalkeeper

Team information
- Current team: Alberts (youth team coach)

Youth career
- 1995–2001: FK Auda
- 2001–2006: Skonto Riga

Senior career*
| Years | Team | Apps | (Gls) |
| 2006–2012 | Skonto Riga | 93 | (1) |
| 2007 | → Olimps (loan) | 27 | (0) |
| 2013–2014 | BATE Borisov | 4 | (0) |
| 2015 | Skonto Riga | 7 | (0) |
| 2016–2017 | Rīgas FS | 41 | (0) |
| 2018 | Riga | 4 | (0) |
| 2019 | Jelgava | 17 | (0) |
| 2020 | Nordvärmland | 11 | (0) |
| 2021–2026 | Alberts | 63 | (0) |

International career
| 2003 | Latvia U17 | 2 | (0) |
| 2005 | Latvia U19 | 3 | (0) |

Managerial career
- 2026–: Alberts (youth team coach)
- * Club domestic league appearances and goals as of 28 September 2026

Germans Māliņš (born 12 October 1987) is a Latvian football coach and former player.

== Club career ==
=== Skonto Riga ===
Born in Riga, as a youth player Māliņš played for his local club FK Auda, before moving to JFC Skonto in 2001. He spent 5 years in the academy, being taken to the club's first team in 2006 as the third choice keeper. In the beginning of 2007 he was given out on loan to Olimps in order to gain experience. During the loan spell Māliņš made his debut in the Latvian Higher League and became the club's first choice keeper. He returned to Skonto for the 2008 season, serving as the back-up keeper for Pāvels Doroševs. Māliņš started the 2009 season as the first-choice keeper, but after the arrival of Aleksandrs Vlasovs from SK Blāzma was once again put on the bench. From 2010 to 2011 he was mainly used as the reserve keeper, with Kaspars Ikstens in the goal. On 27 April 2011, during a league match against Daugava Daugavpils, Ikstens was seriously injured and was out for the rest of the season, with Māliņš immediately filling his place. On 18 June 2011 he helped his team become the champions of the Baltic League, beating FK Ventspils in penalties. On 13 August 2011 Māliņš secured his club a late 1–1 draw in a league match against FC Jūrmala, scoring a goal with a header after a corner kick in the 94th minute. After several outstanding performances he was named the keeper of the season by Latvian Football Federation. In 2012 Māliņš appeared in 39 matches as the team's captain, helping Skonto finish the championship as the runners-up and win the Latvian Cup. He was named the goalkeeper of the season for the second year in a row.

=== BATE Borisov ===
In February 2013 Māliņš went on trial with the Belarusian Premier League champions BATE Borisov and signed a one-year contract with them in March 2013. Since then he was mainly used as the back-up keeper for Andrey Harbunow. Māliņš made his debut for the club on 3 August 2013 in a 5-1 league match victory over Naftan Novopolotsk, playing all 90 minutes and conceding a goal from the penalty spot. In 2013, he helped BATE win the Belarus Premier League. On 29 December 2013 it was announced that Māliņš had extended his contract with BATE.

=== FK Jelgava ===
Māliņš joined FK Jelgava on 1 January 2019.

=== JDFS Alberts ===
After a spell in Sweden, Māliņš joined JDFS Alberts in 2021.

== International career ==
Māliņš has represented Latvia at U17 and U19 levels. He was called up to the Latvia national football team for a friendly match against Armenia on 11 February 2009, but did not join the squad due to his father's death. His second call-up came 2 years later, as he was an unused substitute in a friendly match against Finland on 10 August 2011.

== Honours ==
Skonto Riga

- Latvian Higher League: 2010
- Baltic League: 2011
- Latvian Cup: 2012

BATE Borisov

- Belarus Premier League: 2013, 2014
- Belarus Super Cup: 2014

Latvia

- Baltic Cup: 2012

Individual

- Latvian Higher League keeper of the season: 2011, 2012
