= Rytis Leliūga =

Lithuanian footballer

Personal information
- Full name: Rytis Leliūga
- Date of birth: 4 January 1987 (age 39)
- Place of birth: Mažeikiai, Lithuanian SSR, USSR (now Republic of Lithuania)
- Height: 1.74 m (5 ft 8 1/2 in)
- Position: Midfielder

Team information
- Current team: FK Jelgava
- Number: 19

Senior career*
| Years | Team | Apps | (Gls) |
| 2005–2006 | Exeter City | | |
| 2006 | Bryne FK | | |
| 2007–2009 | Herfølge Boldklub | 1 | |
| 2009–2010 | HB Køge | 13 | (0) |
| 2011 | FK Šiauliai | 5 | (1) |
| 2012 | Gjøvik FF | | |
| 2012 | Liepājas Metalurgs | 20 | (6) |
| 2012–2014 | FK Žalgiris Vilnius | 41 | (12) |
| 2014–2015 | JK Sillamäe Kalev | 3 | (0) |
| 2015–2016 | HamKam | | |
| 2017– | FK Jelgava | 0 | (0) |

International career^{‡}
| 2003 | Lithuania U-17 | 3 | (1) |
| 2004–2005 | Lithuania U-19 | 3 | (1) |
| 2006–2009 | Lithuania U-21 | 7 | (0) |
- * Club domestic league appearances and goals as of 27 March 2017 ‡ National team caps and goals as of 7 August 2010

Rytis Leliūga (born 4 January 1987) is a Lithuanian footballer who currently plays as a midfielder (association football) for FK Jelgava.

Leliūga is from Lithuania, whose national team he has represented at Under-18 level. He signed professional terms with Exeter at the beginning of the 2005/06 season and is a midfielder. He was released by Exeter City and signed for Norwegian club Bryne.

After being released by Exeter he had a trial (1. week of July 2006) at Norwegian 1. div club Bryne FK and signed a contract until the end of the season. However, in January 2007 he was persuaded to switch to Danish side Herfølge BK by fellow Lithuanian Aurelijus Skarbalius, who is the manager of the club. He left the club in 2010.

In April 2012 he signed for the Norwegian club Gjøvik FF, where he played till July. In July 2012 Leliūga joined the Latvian Higher League club Liepājas Metalurgs. In August 2012 Leliūga was named the best Latvian Higher League player of the month. All in all he participated in 25 matches, scoring 8 goals for Metalurgs, 20 and 8 of those, respectively, were achieved in the Latvian Higher League. On 21 December 2012 Leliūga moved to the Lithuanian A Lyga side Žalgiris Vilnius.
