= Konstantin Belov =

Russian professional football player

Personal information
- Full name: Konstantin Vladimirovich Belov
- Date of birth: 4 January 1990 (age 36)
- Place of birth: Ashgabat, Turkmen SSR
- Height: 1.82 m (6 ft 0 in)
- Positions: Defender; midfielder

Youth career
- 2008: Lokomotiv Moscow

Senior career*
Years	Team	Apps	(Gls)
2008	Amkar Perm	0	(0)
2009	Moscow	0	(0)
2010	Zvezda Ryazan	11	(0)
2011	Khimki	0	(0)
2011	→ Jūrmala (loan)	15	(5)
2012	Dnepr Smolensk	9	(1)
2012	Petrotrest Saint Petersburg	1	(0)
2013	Jūrmala	9	(0)
2014	Kolomna	9	(0)
2014–2015	Afips Afipsky	32	(4)
2016	Isloch Minsk Raion	5	(1)
2017	Alga Bishkek	3	(0)
2017	Samtredia	8	(0)
2017–2018	Bartınspor		
2018	Yeniçağa		
2018–2020	Druzhba Maykop	40	(0)
2020–2023	Znamya Noginsk	38	(2)
- * Club domestic league appearances and goals

Konstantin Vladimirovich Belov (Russian: Константин Владимирович Белов; born 4 January 1990) is a Russian former professional football player.

== Club career ==
He made his Russian Football National League debut for FC Petrotrest Saint Petersburg on 23 July 2012 in a game against FC Yenisey Krasnoyarsk
