= Georgi Ulyanov =

Russian footballer

Personal information
- Full name: Georgi Vladimirovich Ulyanov
- Date of birth: 12 September 1985 (age 41)
- Place of birth: Yaroslavl, Russian SFSR
- Height: 2.00 m (6 ft 7 in)
- Position: Defender

Senior career*
Years	Team	Apps	(Gls)
2005–2007	Shinnik Yaroslavl	1	(0)
2007–2009	Dinaburg Daugavpils	12	(1)
2010–2011	FC Sheksna Cherepovets	22	(1)
2011–2012	Daugava Daugavpils	40	(4)
- * Club domestic league appearances and goals

Georgi Vladimirovich Ulyanov (Russian: Георгий Владимирович Ульянов; born 12 September 1985) is a Russian former footballer.

== Club career ==
He played for Shinnik Yaroslavl in the Russian Premier League.
