= Dmitri Polovinchuk =

Russian footballer (born 1982)

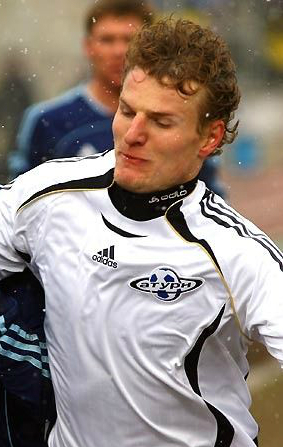
- Polovinchuk in action for FC Saturn Ramenskoye

Personal information
- Full name: Dmitri Vyacheslavovich Polovinchuk
- Date of birth: 27 September 1982 (age 44)
- Place of birth: Moscow, USSR (now Russia)
- Height: 1.81 m (5 ft 11 1/2 in)
- Position: Defender

Youth career
- FC Dynamo Moscow

Senior career*
Years	Team	Apps	(Gls)
1999–2000	FC Dynamo-2 Moscow	38	(1)
2004–2005	FC Dynamo Moscow	54	(0)
2006–2008	FC Saturn Ramenskoye	35	(0)
2008–2010	FC Shinnik Yaroslavl	22	(0)
2011	FC Torpedo Vladimir	18	(0)
2012	FC Daugava	27	(0)
2014–2016	FC Odintsovo		
- * Club domestic league appearances and goals

Dmitri Vyacheslavovich Polovinchuk (Russian: Дмитрий Вячеславович Половинчук; born 27 September 1982) is a former Russian footballer.
