= Igors Savčenkovs =

Latvian footballer

Personal information
- Full name: Igors Savčenkovs
- Date of birth: 3 November 1982 (age 43)
- Place of birth: Ventspils, Latvian SSR, Soviet Union (now Republic of Latvia)
- Height: 1.96 m (6 ft 5 in)
- Position: Defender

Youth career
- FK Ventspils

Senior career*
Years	Team	Apps	(Gls)
2002–2006	FK Ventspils		
2006	Dinaburg FC	22	(0)
2007–2012	FK Ventspils	80	(7)
2010	→ FK Jelgava (loan)	11	(2)
2012	Skonto Riga	35	(3)
2013	FC Daugava	25	(1)
2014	Torpedo Kutaisi	14	(2)
2014–2016	FK Jelgava	28	(3)
2017	FK Ventspils	5	(0)

International career^{‡}
2008–2012	Latvia	3	(0)
- * Club domestic league appearances and goals as of 6 November 2016 ‡ National team caps and goals as of 6 November 2016

Igors Savčenkovs (born 3 November 1982) is a Latvian former professional footballer who played as a defender.

His previous clubs were FK Ventspils, Dinaburg Daugavpils, Skonto Riga, Daugava Daugavpils and Torpedo Kutaisi.
