= Daniel Ola =

Ghanaian-Nigerian football defender (born 1982)

Personal information
- Full name: Daniel Ola
- Date of birth: November 23, 1982 (age 43)
- Place of birth: Accra, Ghana
- Height: 1.87 m (6 ft 2 in)
- Position: Defender

Team information
- Current team: Ginosa (technical collaborator)

Youth career
- 1997–1999: King Faisal Babes
- 1999–2000: Carouge
- 2000–2001: Lazio
- 2001: Chievo

Senior career*
Years	Team	Apps	(Gls)
2002–2003	L'Aquila	45	(3)
2003–2005	Teramo	58	(4)
2005–2008	Cesena	42	(1)
2009	Botev Plovdiv	6	(0)
2010–2011	Persebaya Surabaya	26	(1)
2011–2012	FC Jūrmala	47	(5)
2012	→ Daugava Daugavpils (loan)	14	(2)
2013	Daugava Daugavpils	27	(2)
2014	UTA Arad	6	(0)
2014–2015	Fidelis Andria	16	(1)
2015–2016	Bisceglie	30	(0)
2016	Barletta	2	(0)
2016–2017	Picerno	10	(0)
2017	Olympia Agnonese	?	(?)
2017–2018	Barletta	12	(3)
2018–2019	Manfredonia	18	(7)
2019–2020	Buccino Volcei	16	(4)
2020–2022	Ginosa	12	(0)
- * Club domestic league appearances and goals as of 28 January 2022

Daniel Ola (born 23 November 1982) is a Ghanaian-Nigerian football coach and former defender. He is currently a technical collaborator for Italian amateur club Ginosa.

== Playing career ==
His name "Ola" means "Wealth" in Yoruba. Ola began his career with King Faisal Babes.

He came to Europe in 1999 and played in Switzerland for Carouge before June 2000 when he was scouted by S.S. Lazio and he joined the club's reserves. The Roma based club played in the UEFA Champions League in 2000.

In 2001 Ola left the club and moved to Chievo. After 6 months he left Verona and moved to L'Aquila and played 45 games, and scored 3 goals in the Serie C1 as well.

In 2003, he was transferred to Teramo. He was sold to Cesena in co-ownership deal in summer 2007.

Ola left the club in the summer of 2008 and one year later he signed a contract with Bulgarian club Botev Plovdiv. In May 2010 he joined Persebaya. In April 2011 he joined the Latvian side FC Jūrmala.

In August 2012, Ola was loaned to another Latvian Higher League club Daugava Daugavpils. He scored 2 goals in 14 matches and helped his team become the champions of Latvia. After the 2012 season his contract with Jūrmala expired, and Ola joined Daugava Daugavpils on permanent basis, helping the club win the Latvian Supercup in the beginning of the year.

In February 2014, Ola was transferred to the Romanian Liga II club UTA Arad alongside his former Daugava teammate Stanley Ibe. Their club was relegated to the Liga III after the season.

In September 2014, Ola signed a 1-year deal with the Serie D side Fidelis Andria, winning the championship and being promoted to Lega Pro.

At the end of the season Ola became a free agent; in July 2015 he signed with the Italian Serie D side Bisceglie.

== Coaching career ==
After ending his active career in 2022 with Ginosa, Ola agreed to stay on at the amateur club as a technical collaborator.

== International career ==
His first call on 5 August 2008 was to the Nigeria national football team against South Africa. He was an unused substitute.
