= Tomas Tamošauskas =

Lithuanian footballer and manager

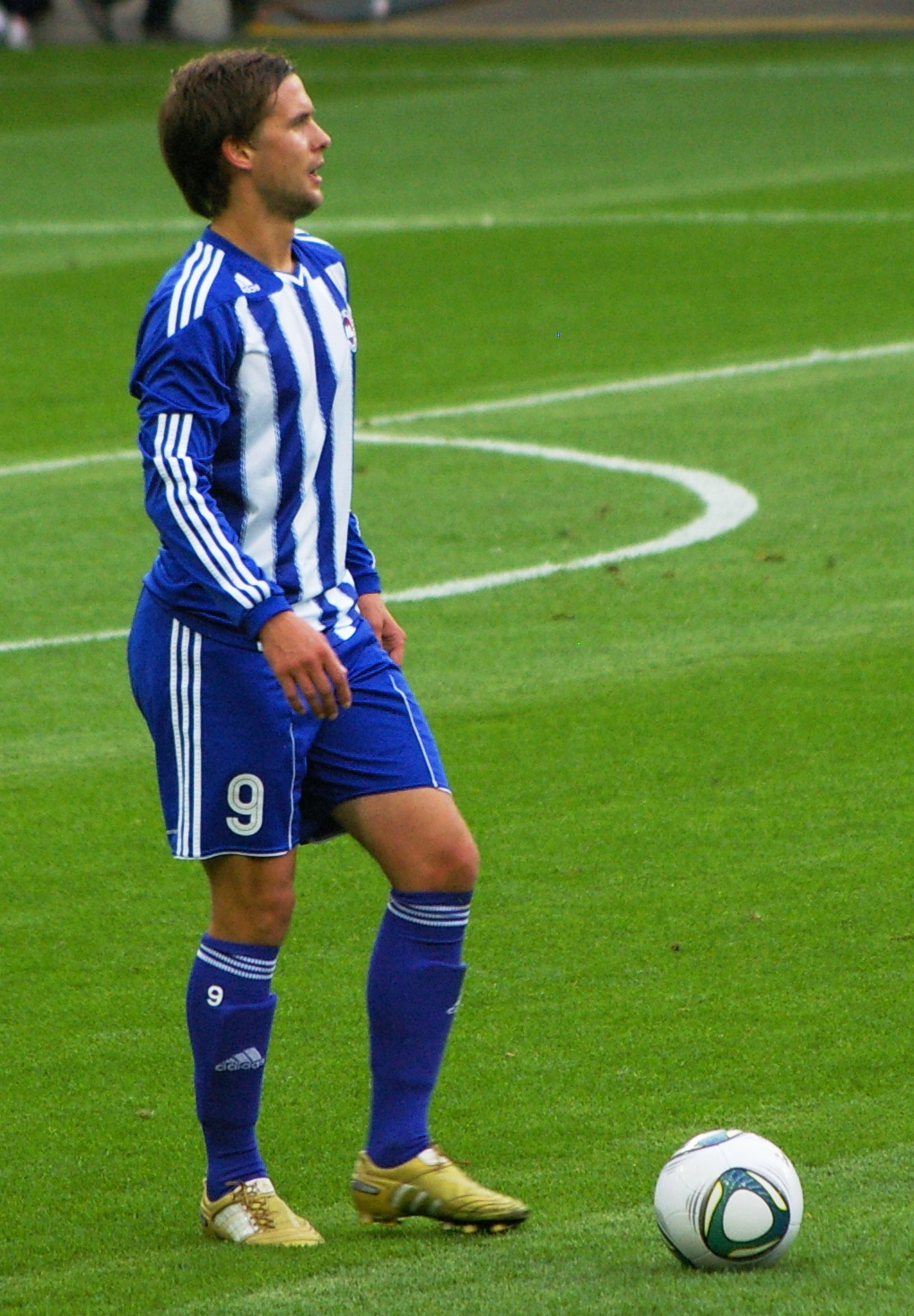

Personal information
- Date of birth: 22 May 1983 (age 43)
- Place of birth: Gargždai, Lithuanian SSR, Soviet Union (now Republic of Lithuania)
- Height: 1.81 m (5 ft 11 1/2 in)
- Position: Midfielder

Senior career*
Years	Team	Apps	(Gls)
2000	Banga Gargždai	23	(4)
2001–2002	FK Atlantas	54	(7)
2003–2004	Dynamo Moscow	1	(0)
2005	→ FBK Kaunas (loan)	16	(4)
2006–2012	Liepājas Metalurgs	151	(6)
2013	Daugava Rīga	14	(1)
2014	Klaipėdos Granitas	12	(1)

International career
2003–2006	Lithuania under-21	?	(?)
2003–2009	Lithuania	18	(1)

Managerial career
- 2016: FK Pramogos-Ąžuolas Gargždai
- 2017–2021: FK Banga Gargždai
- * Club domestic league appearances and goals

Tomas Tamošauskas (born 22 May 1983) is a Lithuanian football manager and a former midfielder.

== Club career ==
Tamošauskas began his career at Banga Gargždai in 2000. In 2001, he moved to FK Atlantas where he scored the club's consolation goal in their UEFA Cup 2002-03 qualifying round match against Bulgarian club, PFC Litex Lovech which they lost 3–1.

He then moved to Russia to play for Dynamo Moscow in 2003 where he made just one league appearance and played mostly reserve team football. On 10 February 2005 he moved back to Lithuania with FBK Kaunas on loan from Dynamo Moscow.

In 2006, he moved to Latvia to play for Liepājas Metalurgs. On 16 August 2007 he scored the winning goal for Metalurgs in their 3–2 win over Swedish club, AIK in their 2007-08 UEFA Cup second qualifying round match. From summer 2009 to 2012 Tomašauskas was the captain of Liepājas Metalurgs.

In January 2013 Tomašauskas moved to the Latvian Higher League club Daugava Rīga. At the start of 2014 he returned to Lithuania, joining Klaipėdos Granitas. He left the team in July the same year.

== International career ==
Tamošauskas has played for the Lithuanian Under-21 team and the Lithuania national team 18 times, scoring 1 goal.

== Honours ==
Club

- Latvian Cup winner (1): 2006
- Baltic League winner (1): 2007
- Latvian Higher League champion (1): 2009
