= FB Gulbene =

Association football club in Latvia

- Full name: Futbola biedrība "Gulbene" (Football Society "Gulbene")
- Founded: 2005; 20 years ago
- Ground: Gulbenes Sporta Centrs, Gulbene
- Capacity: 1500
- Chairman: Romāns Lajuks
- Manager: Igors Korabļovs
- League: Higher League
- 2017: 3rd Latvian Second League, Northeastern Division
Home colours	Away colours

FB Gulbene (formerly known as FB Gulbene-2005) is a Latvian professional football club based in Gulbene. The club plays its home matches at the Gulbenes Sporta Centrs stadium with capacity of 1,500 people. They were promoted to the Latvian Higher League for the 2015 season. However, on 3 June 2015, they were expelled from the top league and their results expunged on suspicion of match-fixing.

== History ==
FB Gulbene were founded on May 24, 2005, as "FB Gulbene-2005". The club started its participation in the Latvian Second League in 2007, finishing in the 4th place. In 2008 FB Gulbene-2005 played in the Latvian First League and finished in the 14th place at the end of the season. The 2009 season was yet again spent in the Second League that is the third tier of Latvian football. The club finished in the 4th place, being promoted to the First League. In 2010 ambitions got higher as Romāns Lajuks became the president of the team. Several players with Latvian Higher League experience were invited to join, and not surprisingly the team won the Latvian First League that year, being promoted to the Latvian Higher League.

In 2011, before the start of the season, the club's name was changed to its current version FB Gulbene. For the past few years FB Gulbene have actively co-worked with several Japanese football academies, giving their players a chance to play in Europe. Club's ex-president Romāns Lajuks was familiar with the Embassy of Japan Deputy Head of Mission Mr.Takeshi. In 2011 the club finished the Latvian Higher League championship in the 7th place. Finishing the 2012 season in the 10th place they were automatically relegated from the Latvian Higher League.

In 2016, the club applied to participate in the Northeastern Division of the Latvian Second League.

== Honours ==
- Latvian First League champions (2)
  - 2010, 2014
- LFF Fair-play award (2)
  - 2010, 2011

== Managers ==
Name	Period
(Latvia) Gatis Rikveilis	2005–2009
(Latvia) Mihails Koņevs	2010–2012
(Latvia) Igors Korabļovs	2013 – ...

== League and Cup history ==
Season	Division	Position/Teams	Latvian Football Cup	Notes
2007	3rd (2. līga)	4/11	1st Round	
2008	2nd (1. līga)	14/15	Did not participate	
2009	3rd (2. līga)	4/11	Did not participate	
2010	2nd (1. līga)	1/12	1st Round	
2011	1st (Virslīga)	7/9	1/8 finals	
2012	1st (Virsliga)	10/10	semi-finals	
2013	2nd (1. līga)	2/16	1/4 finals	
2014	2nd (1. līga)	1/16	1/4 finals	
2015	1st (Virsliga)	8/8	1/8 finals	On 3 June 2015, Gulbene were excluded from the top league and their results were expunged after suspicion of match-fixing.

== Sponsors ==
Role	Sponsors
General sponsors	(Latvia) Gulbenes Dome
Kit manufacturer	(Italy) Erreà

== Players and staff ==
=== Current squad ===
Entry for the 2015 Latvian First League season, according to LFF.lv

Note: Flags indicate national team as defined under FIFA eligibility rules; some limited exceptions apply. Players may hold more than one non-FIFA nationality.

No.	Pos.	Nation	Player
1	GK	LVA	Alberts Nikoļskis
2	DF	LVA	Sergejs Tjurikovs
3	DF	LVA	Aleksandrs Solovjovs
4	DF	LVA	Mihails Beršovs
5	DF	LVA	Vladislavs Pavļučenko
6	MF	LVA	Dmitrijs Telešs
7	DF	LVA	Kirils Jeļkins
8	MF	LVA	Jaroslavs Zoricovs
9	FW	LVA	Ernests Pilats
10	FW	LVA	Viktors Kurma
11	MF	LVA	Vladimirs Volkovs
13	MF	LVA	Ņikita Pačko
—	MF	ROU	Alin Stoica

No.	Pos.	Nation	Player
14	DF	LVA	Aleksandrs Ivanovs
15	MF	LVA	Aleksandrs Klimovs
16	DF	LVA	Gatis Štrauss
17	FW	LVA	Jānis Lapss (captain)
18	DF	LVA	Igors Korabļovs
19	DF	LVA	Kristaps Soloveiko
20	MF	LVA	Kirils Telegins
23	MF	LVA	Konstantīns Budilovs
34	FW	LVA	Ruslans Ķeirāns
71	GK	LVA	Vladislavs Lazarevs
81	GK	LVA	Marks Bogdanovs
—	FW	FIN	Iidle Elmi

=== Staff ===
Name, surname	Position
(Latvia) Romāns Lajuks	Chairman
(Latvia) Igors Korabļovs	Manager
(Latvia) Aivars Blauvs	Coach
(Latvia) Liļa Medne	Doctor
