= 2007 Baltic League =

Football club tournament held between the top clubs from Baltic states

Baltic League
- Season: 2007
- Dates: 6 March – 11 November
- Champions: (Latvia) Metalurgs
- Matches: 34
- Goals: 105 (3.09 per match)
- Top goalscorer: Ģirts Karlsons (10)

The 2007 season of Baltic League (known as the TrioBet Baltic League for sponsorship reasons) was the first edition of the Baltic League. The competition was won by Liepājas Metalurgs of Latvia, who beat fellow Latvians FK Ventspils 8–2 on aggregate in the final, which was spread over two legs on 8 November 2007 and 11 November 2007.

== Group stage ==
=== Group A ===
| Team | Pld | W | D | L | GF | GA | GD | Pts | Qualification |
|---|---|---|---|---|---|---|---|---|---|
| (Lithuania) FBK Kaunas | 2 | 1 | 1 | 0 | 5 | 4 | +1 | 4 | Advanced to knockout stage |
| (Estonia) FC Narva Trans | 2 | 0 | 1 | 1 | 4 | 5 | −1 | 1 | Advanced to knockout stage |
| (Latvia) Dinaburg FC | 0 | 0 | 0 | 0 | 0 | 0 | 0 | 0 (Note: Dinaburg FC were ejected from the competition for match fixing.) | Ejected |

Notes:

| 7 March 2007 Matchday 1 | FBK Kaunas | 3 – 2 | Narva Trans | Vilnius |
| 18:00 EET (UTC+02) | Ričardas Beniušis 61'; Givi Kvaratskhelia 83'; Rafael Gaúcho 88' | | 11' Aleksandr Dubõkin; 65' Sergei Kazakov | Stadium: Sportima Sports Hall; Attendance: 350; Referee: Sergejs Braga |

| 22 May 2007 Matchday 6 | Narva Trans | 2 – 2 | FBK Kaunas | Narva |
| 18:00 EEST (UTC+03) | Aleksandr Dubõkin 49'; Maksim Gruznov 73' | | 24', 33' Mindaugas Grigalevičius | Stadium: Narva Kreenholmi Stadium; Attendance: 1500; Referee: Vadims Direktorenko |

=== Group B ===
| Team | Pld | W | D | L | GF | GA | GD | Pts | Qualification |
|---|---|---|---|---|---|---|---|---|---|
| (Latvia) FK Ventspils | 4 | 3 | 1 | 0 | 7 | 2 | +5 | 10 | Advanced to knockout stage |
| (Lithuania) FK Ekranas | 4 | 1 | 2 | 1 | 5 | 7 | −2 | 5 | Advanced to knockout stage |
| (Estonia) FC TVMK Tallinn | 4 | 0 | 1 | 3 | 6 | 9 | −3 | 1 | Eliminated from the competition |

| 6 March 2007 Matchday 1 | Ekranas | 2 – 1 | TVMK | Vilnius |
| 18:00 EET (UTC+02) | Giedrius Tomkevičius 11'; Liivo Leetma 34' (og.) | | 76' Artur Ossipov | Attendance: 600; Referee: Roman Lajuks |

| 13 March 2007 Matchday 2 | TVMK | 0 – 1 | Ventspils | Tallinn |
| 18:00 EEST (UTC+03) | | | 83' Aleksejs Soleičuks | Stadium: Sportland Arena; Attendance: 150; Referee: Audrius Zhuta |

| 17 March 2007 Matchday 3 | Ventspils | 3 – 0 | Ekranas |
| 14:00 EEST (UTC+03) | Vīts Rimkus 3', 23'; Igors Sļesarčuks 19' | | | Attendance: 500; Referee: Hannes Kaasik |

| 1 April 2007 Matchday 4 | Ekranas | 0 – 0 | Ventspils |

| 11 April 2007 Matchday 5 | Ventspils | 3 – 2 | TVMK | Ventspils |
| 18:00 EEST (UTC+03) | Serhij Sernecki 6', 9'; Sergei Zangareev 23' | | 1' Oliver Konsa; 85' Viktors Dobrecovs | Attendance: 350; Referee: Gediminas Mažeika |

| 22 May 2007 Matchday 6 | TVMK | 3 – 3 | Ekranas | Tallinn |
| 17:00 EEST (UTC+03) | Artur Ossipov 45', 65'; Aleksandr Kulatšenko 76' | | 7', 38' Dainius Saulėnas; 63' Andrius Šidlauskas | Stadium: Kadrioru Stadium; Attendance: 100 |

=== Group C ===
| Team | Pld | W | D | L | GF | GA | GD | Pts | Qualification |
|---|---|---|---|---|---|---|---|---|---|
| (Latvia) FK Liepājas Metalurgs | 4 | 2 | 2 | 0 | 6 | 3 | +3 | 8 | Advanced to knockout stage |
| (Lithuania) FK Žalgiris Vilnius | 4 | 1 | 2 | 1 | 4 | 5 | −1 | 5 | Advanced to knockout stage |
| (Estonia) FC Levadia Tallinn | 4 | 0 | 2 | 2 | 4 | 6 | −2 | 2 | Eliminated from the competition |

| 7 March 2007 Matchday 1 | Levadia | 1 – 1 | Žalgiris | Tallinn |
| 18:00 EET (UTC+02) | Indrek Zelinski 30' (pen.) | | 74' Eimantas Poderis | Stadium: Sportland Arena; Attendance: 300; Referee: Andrejs Sipailo |

| 13 March 2007 Matchday 2 | SK Liepājas Metalurgs | 1 – 1 | Levadia | Liepāja |
| 18:00 EEST (UTC+03) | Oskars Kļava 32' (pen.) | | 38' Tarmo Kink | Stadium: Daugava Stadium's Artificial Pitch; Attendance: 1200; Referee: Vijunas Vasiliauskas |

| 17 March 2007 Matchday 3 | Žalgiris | 0 – 0 | SK Liepājas Metalurgs |
| 14:00 EEST (UTC+03) | | | | Referee: Sten Kaldma |

| 1 April 2007 Matchday 4 | SK Liepājas Metalurgs | 3 – 1 | Žalgiris |
| | Mindaugas Kalonas 23'; Ģirts Karlsons 64', 67' | | 90' (pen.) Igoris Morinas |

| 11 April 2007 Matchday 5 | Levadia | 1 – 2 | SK Liepājas Metalurgs | Tallinn |
| 18:00 EEST (UTC+03) | Tarmo Kink 66' | | 46' Mindaugas Kalonas; 68' Antonio Ferreira | Stadium: Kadrioru Stadium; Attendance: 530; Referee: Audrius Kancleris |

| 22 May 2007 Matchday 6 | Žalgiris | 2 – 1 | Levadia | Vilnius |
| 17:00 EEST (UTC+03) | Edvinas Lukoševičius 44'; Nikolaj Misiuk 83' | | 59' Indrek Zelinski | Stadium: Žalgiris Stadium; Attendance: 500 |

=== Group D ===
| Team | Pld | W | D | L | GF | GA | GD | Pts | Qualification |
|---|---|---|---|---|---|---|---|---|---|
| (Latvia) Skonto FC | 4 | 2 | 2 | 0 | 7 | 2 | +5 | 8 | Advanced to knockout stage |
| (Lithuania) FK Vėtra | 4 | 1 | 2 | 1 | 5 | 3 | +2 | 5 | Advanced to knockout stage |
| (Estonia) FC Flora Tallinn | 4 | 1 | 0 | 3 | 1 | 8 | −7 | 3 | Eliminated from the competition |

| 6 March 2007 Matchday 1 | Flora | 0 – 3 | Vėtra | Tallinn |
| 18:00 EET (UTC+02) | | | 54' Algis Jankauskas; 64' Nerijus Sasnauskas; 85' Severino Lima de Maura | Stadium: Sportland Arena; Attendance: 300; Referee: Vadims Direktorenko |

| 14 March 2007 Matchday 2 | Skonto FC | 4 – 0 | Flora | Riga |
| 18:00 EEST (UTC+03) | Vitālijs Astafjevs 35'; Gatis Kalniņš 50'; Andrejs Perepļotkins 85'; Jozef Piaček 87' | | | Stadium: Ķeizarmežs Sports Complex; Attendance: 320; Referee: Gediminas Mazheika |

| 18 March 2007 Matchday 3 | Vėtra | 1 – 1 | Skonto FC | Vilnius |
| 14:00 EEST (UTC+03) | Vitalis Stankevičius 70' | | 20' Aleksejs Višņakovs | Referee: Eiko Saar |

| 1 April 2007 Matchday 4 | Skonto FC | 1 – 1 | Vėtra | Riga |
| | Aleksandrs Cauņa 53' | | 19' Severino Lima de Maura |

| 10 April 2007 Matchday 5 | Flora | 0 – 1 | Skonto FC | Tallinn |
| 18:00 EEST (UTC+03) | | | 90+3' Aleksejs Višņakovs | Stadium: A. Le Coq Arena; Attendance: 220; Referee: Paulius Malžinskas |

| 22 May 2007 Matchday 6 | Vėtra | 0 – 1 | Flora | Vilnius |
| 20:45 EEST (UTC+03) | | | 41' Enver Jääger | Stadium: Vėtra Stadium; Attendance: 350; Referee: Andrejs Sipailo |

== Knockout stage ==
=== Bracket ===
Quarterfinals
(Lithuania) Žalgiris | 1 | 1 | 2
(Lithuania) FBK Kaunas | 9 | 1 | 10
(Lithuania) Vėtra | 0 | 2 | 2
(Latvia) Ventspils | 0 | 4 | 4
(Latvia) Metalurgs | 4 | 1 | 5
(Estonia) Narva Trans | 1 | 2 | 3
(Latvia) Skonto FC | 1 | 0 | 1
(Lithuania) Ekranas | 2 | 0 | 2

Semifinals
(Lithuania) FBK Kaunas | 0 | 0 | 0
(Latvia) Ventspils | 0 | 1 | 1
(Latvia) Metalurgs | 6 | 2 | 8
(Lithuania) Ekranas | 1 | 2 | 3

Final
(Latvia) Ventspils | 1 | 1 | 2
(Latvia) Metalurgs | 3 | 5 | 8

=== Quarter-finals ===
| 12 June 2007 Leg 1 | Žalgiris | 1 – 9 | FBK Kaunas | Vilnius |
| | Virmantas Lemežis 23' | | 20' Audrius Kšanavičius; 22' Mindaugas Grigalevičius; 36' Marius Činikas; 43' Rafael Gaúcho; 48', 65', 73', 90' Ričardas Beniušis; 52' Adrian Mrowiec | Stadium: Žalgiris Stadium; Attendance: 600; Referee: A. Sipailo |

| 4 July 2007 Leg 2 | FBK Kaunas | 1 – 1 | Žalgiris | Kaunas |
| | Artūras Rimkevičius 88' | | 45' Nikolaj Misiuk | Stadium: S.Darius and S.Girėnas; Referee: R. Lajuks |

FBK Kaunas won 10–2 on aggregate.

| 13 June 2007 Leg 1 | Skonto FC | 1 – 2 | Ekranas | Riga |
| | Marián Dirnbach 73' | | 45' Mantas Savėnas; 74' Povilas Lukšys | Stadium: Skonto Stadions; Referee: E. Saar |

| 4 July 2007 Leg 2 | Ekranas | 0 – 0 | Skonto FC | Panevėžys |
| | | | | Stadium: Aukštaitija Stadium; Attendance: 1,420; Referee: Hannes Kaasik |

Ekranas won 2–1 on aggregate.

| 13 June 2007 Leg 1 | Vėtra | 0 – 0 | Ventspils | Vilnius |
| | | | | Stadium: Vėtra Stadium; Referee: Kristo Tohver |

| 4 July 2007 Leg 2 | Ventspils | 4 – 2 | Vėtra | Ventspils |
| | Vladimirs Koļesņičenko 23'; Serhij Sernecki 60', 90+6'; Vīts Rimkus 90' | | 2' Darvydas Šernas; 90+2' Dejan Milošeski | Stadium: Ventspils Olimpiskais Stadions; Attendance: 800; Referee: Margus Kotter |

FK Ventspils won 4–2 on aggregate.

| 13 June 2007 Leg 1 | SK Liepājas Metalurgs | 4 – 1 | Narva Trans | Liepāja |
| | Mindaugas Kalonas 19', 63'; Ģirts Karlsons 72'; Genādijs Soloņicins 77' | | 27' Dmitry Lipartov | Stadium: Daugava Stadium; Attendance: 1,200; Referee: V. Direktorenko |

| 4 July 2007 Leg 2 | Narva Trans | 2 – 1 | SK Liepājas Metalurgs | Narva |
| | Dmitry Lipartov 9'; Aleksandr Dubõkin 45+1' | | 26' Genādijs Soloņicins | Stadium: Narva Kreenholmi Stadium; Attendance: 150; Referee: P. Malžinskas |

Liepājas Metalurgs won 5–3 on aggregate.

=== Semi-finals ===
| 29 August 2007 Leg 1 | FBK Kaunas | 0 – 0 | Ventspils |
| 18:00 EEST (UTC+03) |

| 26 September 2007 Leg 2 | Ventspils | 1 – 0 | FBK Kaunas |
| 17:00 EEST (UTC+03) | Aleksandr Mysikov 61' |

FK Ventspils won 1–0 on aggregate.

| 19 September 2007 Leg 1 | SK Liepājas Metalurgs | 6 – 1 | Ekranas |
| 19:40 EEST (UTC+03) | Genādijs Soloņicins 4'; Alfredas Skroblas 32' (og.); Ģirts Karlsons 34', 86'; Serghei Pogreban 44' (og.); Vladimirs Kamešs 90' | | 71' Egidijus Varnas |

| 26 September 2007 Leg 2 | Ekranas | 2 – 2 | SK Liepājas Metalurgs |
| 17:00 EEST (UTC+03) | Egidijus Varnas 16', 68' | | 50' Cristián Torres; 64' Ģirts Karlsons |

Liepājas Metalurgs won 8–3 on aggregate.

=== Final ===
| 8 November 2007 Leg 1 | Ventspils | 1 – 3 | SK Liepājas Metalurgs | Ventspils |
| 13:00 EET (UTC+02) | Kristaps Grebis 75' | | 3' Antonio Ferreira; 38' Ģirts Karlsons; 78' Genādijs Soloņicins | Stadium: Ventspils Olimpiskais Stadions; Attendance: 250; Referee: Kristo Tohver |

| 11 November 2007 Leg 2 | SK Liepājas Metalurgs | 5 – 1 | Ventspils | Liepāja |
| 14:00 EET (UTC+02) | Ģirts Karlsons 36', 66', 75'; Genādijs Soloņicins 49'; Deniss Ivanovs 78' | | 41' Igors Savčenkovs | Stadium: Daugava Stadium; Attendance: 1000; Referee: Audrius Žuta |

Liepājas Metalurgs won 8–2 on aggregate.

== 2007 Baltic League Player Awards ==
- Goalkeeper of the Year: (Estonia) Mihkel Aksalu ( (Estonia) FC Flora)
- Defender of the Year: (Lithuania)
- Midfielder of the Year: (Latvia)
- Forward of the Year: (Latvia)
- Young Footballer of the Year: (Lithuania)

== Goalscorers ==
10 goals

- (Latvia) Ģirts Karlsons

5 goals

- (Lithuania) Ričardas Beniušis
- (Latvia) Genādijs Soloņicins

4 goals

- (Lithuania) Mindaugas Kalonas
- (Ukraine) Serhiy Sernetskyi

3 goals

- (Estonia) Aleksandr Dubõkin
- (Lithuania) Mindaugas Grigalevičius
- (Estonia) Artur Ossipov
- (Latvia) Vīts Rimkus
- (Lithuania) Egidijus Varnas

2 goals

- (Brazil) Antonio Ferreira
- (Brazil) Rafael Gaúcho
- (Estonia) Tarmo Kink
- (Brazil) Severino Lima de Maura
- (Russia) Dmitry Lipartov
- (Lithuania) Nikolaj Misiuk
- (Lithuania) Dainius Saulėnas
- (Latvia) Aleksejs Višņakovs
- (Estonia) Indrek Zelinski

1 goal

- (Latvia) Vitālijs Astafjevs
- (Latvia) Aleksandrs Cauņa
- (Lithuania) Marius Činikas
- (Slovakia) Marián Dirnbach
- (Latvia) Viktors Dobrecovs
- (Latvia) Kristaps Grebis
- (Estonia) Maksim Gruznov
- (Latvia) Deniss Ivanovs
- (Lithuania) Algis Jankauskas
- (Estonia) Enver Jääger
- (Latvia) Gatis Kalniņš
- (Latvia) Vladimirs Kamešs
- (Estonia) Sergei Kazakov
- (Latvia) Oskars Kļava
- (Latvia) Vladimirs Koļesņičenko
- (Estonia) Oliver Konsa
- (Lithuania) Audrius Kšanavičius
- (Estonia) Aleksandr Kulatšenko
- (Georgia (country)) Givi Kvaratskhelia
- (Lithuania) Virmantas Lemežis
- (Lithuania) Edvinas Lukoševičius
- (Lithuania) Povilas Lukšys
- (North Macedonia) Dejan Milošeski
- (Lithuania) Igoris Morinas
- (Poland) Adrian Mrowiec
- (Russia) Aleksandr Mysikov
- (Latvia) Andrejs Perepļotkins
- (Slovakia) Jozef Piaček
- (Lithuania) Eimantas Poderis
- (Lithuania) Artūras Rimkevičius
- (Lithuania) Nerijus Sasnauskas
- (Latvia) Igors Savčenkovs
- (Lithuania) Mantas Savėnas
- (Latvia) Igors Sļesarčuks
- (Latvia) Aleksejs Soleičuks
- (Lithuania) Vitalis Stankevičius
- (Lithuania) Darvydas Šernas
- (Lithuania) Andrius Šidlauskas
- (Lithuania) Giedrius Tomkevičius
- (Argentina) Cristián Torres
- (Russia) Sergei Zangareev

=== Own goals ===
- (Estonia) Liivo Leetma
- (Moldova) Serghei Pogreban
- (Lithuania) Alfredas Skroblas
