= 2007 Baltic League final =

Football club tournament held between the top clubs from Baltic states

- Event: 2007 Baltic League
FK Ventspils	Liepājas Metalurgs
(Latvia)	(Latvia)
2	8

First leg
FK Ventspils	Liepājas Metalurgs
1	3
- Date: November 8, 2007
- Venue: Ventspils Olimpiskais Stadions

Second leg
Liepājas Metalurgs	FK Ventspils
5	1
- Date: November 11, 2007
- Venue: Daugava Stadium

The 2007 Baltic League final (officially known as the 2007 Triobet Baltic League final) was the final of the first ever Baltic League. It was played on November 8 and November 11, 2007 between Latvian teams FK Ventspils and Liepājas Metalurgs. Liepājas Metalurgs won the two matches 8–2 (3–1 and 5–1) on aggregate.

== Route to the final ==
=== Knockout stage ===
FK Ventspils			Liepājas Metalurgs	
(Lithuania) FK Vėtra; A 0–0		Quarter-finals; First Leg	Narva Trans (Estonia); H 4–1	Kalonas 19' 63'; Karlsons 72'; Soloņicins 77'
(Lithuania) FK Vėtra; H 4–2	Koļesņičenko 23'; Sernecki 60' 90+6'; Rimkus 90'	Second Leg	Narva Trans (Estonia); A 1–2	Soloņicins 26'
(Lithuania) FBK Kaunas; A 0–0		Semi-finals; First Leg	FK Ekranas (Lithuania); H 6–1	Soloņicins 4'; Skrobas (og); Karlsons 34' 86'; Pogreban (og); Kamešs 90'
(Lithuania) FBK Kaunas; H 1–0	Aleksandr Mysikov 61'	Second Leg	FK Ekranas (Lithuania); A 2–2	Torres 50'; Karlsons 64'

== Match details ==
=== First leg ===
November 8, 2007
13:00 EET

FK Ventspils (Latvia)	1–3	(Latvia) Liepājas Metalurgs
Grebis 75'	(Report)	Ferreira 3'; Karlsons 38'; Solonicins 78'

Ventspils Olimpiskais Stadions, Ventspils
Attendance: 250
Referee: Kristo Tohver (Estonia)

FK Ventspils	Liepājas Metalurgs

GK	16	(Latvia) Andris Vaņins
DF	8	(Latvia) Deniss Kačanovs
DF	17	(Cameroon) Jéan-Paul Ndeki
DF	22	(Serbia) Saša Cilinšek		(substituted off) 45'
MF	4	(Russia) Zakhar Dubensky	(yellow card) 37'
MF	7	(Russia) Sergei Zangareev
MF	10	(Georgia (country)) Zurab Menteshashvili
MF	14	(Latvia) Mihails Ziziļevs
FW	9	(Latvia) Vits Rimkus		(substituted off) 61'
FW	13	(Latvia) Igors Sļesarčuks
FW	23	(Latvia) Andrejs Butriks		(substituted off) 71'
Substitutes:
GK	77	(Latvia) Pāvels Davidovs
DF	2	(Latvia) Aleksejs Soleičuks		(substituted in) 45'
DF	12	(Latvia) Igors Savčenkovs
DF	21	(Latvia) Artjoms Gončars
MF	24	(Latvia) Artis Lazdiņš
FW	15	(Latvia) Kristaps Grebis		(substituted in) 61'
FW	25	(Latvia) Vladimirs Koļesņičenko		(substituted in) 71'
Manager:
(Ukraine) Roman Hryhorchuk Assistant referees: (Estonia) Jaanus Mutli (Estonia) Sten Klaasen; Fourth official: (Latvia) Vadims Direktorenko

GK	31	(Latvia) Viktors Spole
DF	3	(Latvia) Oskars Kļava
DF	4	(Latvia) Dzintars Zirnis
DF	5	(Brazil) Antonio Ferreira
DF	6	(Latvia) Deniss Ivanovs
MF	8	(Latvia) Imants Bleidelis
MF	10	(Latvia) Andrejs Rubins		(substituted off) 72'
MF	15	(Latvia) Genādijs Soloņicins	(yellow card) 12'
MF	16	(Lithuania) Darius Miceika
FW	20	(Latvia) Ģirts Karlsons
FW	22	(Latvia) Vladimirs Kamešs		(substituted off) 78'
Substitutes:
GK	1	(Latvia) Aleksejs Krucs
DF	2	(Latvia) Andrejs Žuravļovs		(substituted in) 78'
MF	11	(Russia) Alexander Laktionov
MF	13	(Latvia) Pāvels Surņins		(substituted in) 72'
FW	7	(Russia) Evgeni Kets
Manager:
(Latvia) Jurijs Andrejevs

=== Second leg ===
November 11, 2007
14:00 EET

(Latvia) Liepājas Metalurgs	5–1	FK Ventspils (Latvia)
Karlsons 36' 66' 75'; Soloņicins 49'; Ivanovs 78'	(Report)	Savčenkovs 41'

Daugava Stadium, Liepāja
Attendance: 1,000
Referee: Audrius Žuta (Lithuania)

Liepājas Metalurgs	FK Ventspils

GK	31	(Latvia) Viktors Spole
DF	3	(Latvia) Oskars Kļava
DF	4	(Latvia) Dzintars Zirnis	(substituted off) 71'
DF	5	(Brazil) Antonio Ferreira
DF	6	(Latvia) Deniss Ivanovs
MF	8	(Latvia) Imants Bleidelis
MF	9	(Lithuania) Tomas Tamošauskas
MF	15	(Latvia) Genādijs Soloņicins
MF	16	(Lithuania) Darius Miceika	(substituted off) 46'
FW	20	(Latvia) Ģirts Karlsons
FW	22	(Latvia) Vladimirs Kamešs	(substituted off) 71'
Substitutes:
GK	1	(Latvia) Aleksejs Krucs
DF	2	(Latvia) Andrejs Žuravļovs	(substituted in) 71'
MF	10	(Latvia) Andrejs Rubins	(substituted in) 46'
MF	11	(Russia) Alexander Laktionov
MF	13	(Latvia) Pāvels Surņins	(substituted in) 71'
FW	21	(Russia) Evgeni Kets
Manager:
(Latvia) Jurijs Andrejevs Assistant referees: (Lithuania) Arūnas Šeskus (Lithuania) Darius Miklovas; Fourth official: (Latvia) Haralds Gudermanis

GK	16	(Latvia) Andris Vaņins
DF	2	(Latvia) Aleksejs Soleičuks	(substituted off) 61'
DF	12	(Latvia) Igors Savčenkovs
DF	22	(Serbia) Saša Cilinšek
DF	27	(Latvia) Deniss Kačanovs
MF	7	(Russia) Sergei Zangareev
MF	24	(Latvia) Artis Lazdiņš
FW	6	(Russia) Aleksandr Mysikov	(substituted off) 46'
FW	11	(Latvia) Vladimirs Koļesņičenko
FW	15	(Latvia) Kristaps Grebis	(substituted off) 75'
FW	23	(Latvia) Andrejs Butriks
Substitutes:
GK	77	(Latvia) Pāvels Davidovs
DF	18	(Latvia) Vladimirs Bespalovs
DF	21	(Latvia) Artjoms Gončars	(substituted in) 61'
MF	3	(Latvia) Mihails Rjumšins
MF	5	(Latvia) Artūrs Zjuzins
MF	10	(Georgia (country)) Zurab Menteshashvili	(substituted in) 75'
FW	13	(Latvia) Igors Sļesarčuks	(substituted in) 46'
Manager:
(Ukraine) Roman Hryhorchuk
