= 2010–11 Baltic League =

Football club tournament held between the top clubs from Baltic states

Baltic League
- Season: 2010–11
- Dates: 21 September 2010 – 18 June 2011
- Champions: (Latvia) Skonto
- Matches played: 16
- Goals scored: 56 (3.5 per match)
- Top goalscorer: (Brazil) Felipe Rodrigues, (Latvia) Eduards Višņakovs (3)

The 2010–11 Baltic League (known as the Triobet Baltic League for sponsorship reasons) was a 16-team football tournament held in the Baltic states. Five top teams from each participating country – Estonia, Latvia, and Lithuania – along with the winner of the 2009–10 season played a 4-round and 2 legged (excluding final) play-off style knockout tournament. The competition was held from Autumn 2010 through Summer 2011.

== Participating clubs ==
The clubs were divided into 4 pools depending on the rankings in their domestic leagues:

Pool 1

- (Latvia) Ventspils
- (Lithuania) Ekranas
- (Estonia) Levadia
- (Latvia) Metalurgs

Pool 2

- (Lithuania) Šiauliai
- (Estonia) Sillamäe Kalev
- (Latvia) Skonto
- (Lithuania) Sūduva

Pool 3

- (Estonia) Flora
- (Latvia) Jūrmala
- (Lithuania) Tauras
- (Estonia) Trans

Pool 4

- (Lithuania) Banga
- (Latvia) Blāzma
- (Estonia) Kalju
- (Latvia) Olimps/RFS

== Play-off Table ==
Round of 16
(Lithuania) Banga	1	1
(Latvia) Metalurgs	0	4
(Latvia) Jūrmala	1	2
(Estonia) Sillamäe Kalev	2	0
(Latvia) Olimps/RFS	0	0
(Lithuania) Ekranas	1	3
(Lithuania) Tauras	2	0
(Latvia) Skonto	3	0
(Latvia) Ventspils	1	4
(Estonia) Kalju	2	1
(Estonia) Flora	2	2
(Lithuania) Sūduva	1	3
(Latvia) Blāzma	0	3
(Estonia) Levadia	1	5
(Estonia) Trans	5	0
(Lithuania) Šiauliai	1	5

Quarter-finals
(Latvia) Metalurgs	1	5
(Latvia) Jūrmala	1	1
(Lithuania) Ekranas	1	1
(Latvia) Skonto	1	3
(Latvia) Ventspils	1	4
(Estonia) Flora	0	0
(Estonia) Levadia	0	0
(Lithuania) Šiauliai	0	1

Semi-finals
(Latvia) Metalurgs	0	1
(Latvia) Skonto	5	0
(Latvia) Ventspils	2	2
(Lithuania) Šiauliai	0	0

Final
(Latvia) Skonto	1 (5)
(Latvia) Ventspils	1 (4)

== Round of 16 ==
10 October 2010 Leg 1	Banga (Lithuania)	1 – 0	(Latvia) SK Liepājas Metalurgs	Gargždai
16:00 EEST	Anatolie Ostap 38'	Report		Stadium: Gargždai Stadium; Attendance: 650; Referee: Eiko Saar (Estonia)

10 November 2010 Leg 2	SK Liepājas Metalurgs (Latvia)	4 – 1	(Lithuania) Banga	Liepāja
19:00 EET	Vitalijus Kavaliauskas 12'; Antons Jemeļins 52'; Deniss Rakels 60', 68'	Report	28' Aurelijus Staponka	Stadium: Daugava Stadium; Attendance: 500; Referee: Hannes Kaasik (Estonia)

6 October 2010 Leg 1	FK Jūrmala (Latvia)	1 – 2	(Estonia) Sillamäe Kalev	Riga
16:00 EEST	Ruslans Agafonovs 70'	Report	34' Vitalis Stankevičius; 57' Audrius Veikutis	Stadium: Daugava Stadium; Attendance: 25; Referee: Saulius Atmanavicius (Lithuania)

12 October 2010 Leg 2	Sillamäe Kalev (Estonia)	0 – 2	(Latvia) FK Jūrmala	Sillamäe
16:00 EEST		Report	2' Dmitrijs Paplavskis; 90+2' Gatis Kalniņš	Stadium: Sillamäe Kalevi Stadium; Attendance: 60; Referee: Sergejus Sliva (Lithuania)

7 October 2010 Leg 1	Olimps/RFS (Latvia)	0 – 1	(Lithuania) Ekranas	Riga
19:00 EEST		Report	32' Tadas Markevičius	Stadium: Daugava Stadium; Attendance: 50; Referee: Eiko Saar (Estonia)

10 October 2010 Leg 2	Ekranas (Lithuania)	3 – 0	(Latvia) Olimps/RFS	Panevėžys
19:00 EEST	Oleksandr Kablash 28'; Deimantas Bička 40'; Nerijus Sasnauskas 45'	Report		Stadium: Aukštaitija Stadium; Attendance: 450; Referee: Roomer Tarajev (Estonia)

8 October 2010 Leg 1	Tauras (Lithuania)	2 – 3	(Latvia) Skonto FC	Tauragė
14:00 EEST	Mindaugas Grigalevičius 17'; Syarhey Irha 28'	Report	7', 73' Alans Siņeļņikovs; 37' Kaspars Dubra	Stadium: Gargždai Stadium; Attendance: 100; Referee: Sten Kaldma (Estonia)

10 November 2010 Leg 2	Skonto FC (Latvia)	0 – 0	(Lithuania) Tauras	Riga
19:00 EET		Report		Stadium: Skonto Stadium; Attendance: 200; Referee: Jaan Roos (Estonia)

22 September 2010 Leg 1	Nõmme Kalju (Estonia)	2 – 1	(Latvia) Ventspils	Tallinn
19:00 EEST	Jüri Jevdokimov 69', 85'	Report	6' Eduards Višņakovs	Stadium: A. Le Coq Arena; Attendance: 100; Referee: Edmundas Gaigalas (Lithuania)

9 November 2010 Leg 2	Ventspils (Latvia)	4 – 1	(Estonia) Nõmme Kalju	Ventspils
14:00 EET	Jurijs Žigajevs 7'; Eduards Višņakovs 17', 34'; Aleksejs Višņakovs 58'	Report	51' Mikk Haavistu	Stadium: Ventspils Olimpiskais Stadions; Attendance: 150; Referee: Gediminas Mažeika (Lithuania)

21 September 2010 Leg 1	Flora (Estonia)	2 – 1	(Lithuania) Sūduva	Tallinn
19:00 EEST	Karl Palatu 56', 77'	Report	84' Andrius Urbšys	Stadium: A. Le Coq Arena; Attendance: 150; Referee: Sergejs Braga (Latvia)

27 October 2010 Leg 2	Sūduva (Lithuania)	3 – 2	(Estonia) Flora	Marijampolė
19:00 EET	Ričardas Beniušis 21', 48'; Povilas Leimonas 34'	Report	86' (pen.) Valeri Minkenen; 90+3' Sergei Mošnikov	Stadium: Sūduva Stadium; Attendance: 350; Referee: Andris Treimanis (Latvia)

6 October 2010 Leg 1	Blāzma Rēzekne (Latvia)	0 – 1	(Estonia) Levadia	Rēzekne
16:00 EEST		Report	Felipe Nunes 80'	Stadium: Sporta Aģentūras Stadions; Attendance: 300; Referee: Nerijus Dunauskas (Lithuania)

11 October 2010 Leg 2	Levadia (Estonia)	5 – 3	(Latvia) Blāzma Rēzekne	Tallinn
16:00 EEST	Tarmo Neemelo 10', 12'; Deniss Malov 17'; Vitali Leitan 19'; Felipe Nunes 83'	Report	Pavel Ryzhevski 47'; Dmitrijs Suvorovs 53'; Guntars Silagailis 87'	Stadium: Maarjamäe Stadium; Attendance: 30; Referee: Saulius Dirda (Lithuania)

22 September 2010 Leg 1	Narva Trans (Estonia)	5 – 1	(Lithuania) Šiauliai	Narva
17:00 EEST	Marius Bezykornovas 52' (pen.), 78' (pen.); Felipe Rodrigues 75', 86', 89'	Report	45' (pen.) Paulius Drublionis	Stadium: Narva Kreenholmi Stadium; Attendance: 200; Referee: Vadims Direktorenko (Latvia)

26 October 2010 Leg 2	Šiauliai (Lithuania)	5 – 0	(Estonia) Narva Trans	Šiauliai
19:00 EET	Georgas Freidgeimas 13'; Paulius Janušauskas 34', 71'; Viktor Raskov 38'; Ernestas Pilypas 83'	Report		Stadium: Savivaldybė Stadium; Attendance: 400; Referee: (Latvia)

== Goalscorers ==
As of 22 December 2010.

3 goals:

- (Brazil) Felipe Rodrigues
- (Latvia) Eduards Višņakovs

2 goals:

- (Lithuania) Ričardas Beniušis
- (Lithuania) Marius Bezykornovas
- (Lithuania) Paulius Janušauskas
- (Estonia) Jüri Jevdokimov
- (Estonia) Tarmo Neemelo
- (Brazil) Felipe Nunes
- (Estonia) Karl Palatu
- (Latvia) Deniss Rakels
- (Latvia) Alans Siņeļņikovs

1 goal:

- (Latvia) Ruslans Agafonovs
- (Lithuania) Deimantas Bička
- (Lithuania) Paulius Drublionis
- (Latvia) Kaspars Dubra
- (Lithuania) Georgas Freidgeimas
- (Lithuania) Mindaugas Grigalevičius
- (Estonia) Mikk Haavistu
- (Belarus) Syarhey Irha
- (Latvia) Antons Jemeļins
- (Ukraine) Oleksandr Kablash
- (Latvia) Gatis Kalniņš
- (Lithuania) Vitalijus Kavaliauskas
- (Lithuania) Povilas Leimonas
- (Estonia) Vitali Leitan
- (Estonia) Deniss Malov
- (Lithuania) Tadas Markevičius
- (Finland) Valeri Minkenen
- (Estonia) Sergei Mošnikov
- (Moldova) Anatolie Ostap
- (Latvia) Dmitrijs Paplavskis
- (Lithuania) Ernestas Pilypas
- (Ukraine) Viktor Raskov
- (Belarus) Pavel Ryzhevski
- (Lithuania) Nerijus Sasnauskas
- (Latvia) Guntars Silagailis
- (Lithuania) Vitalis Stankevičius
- (Lithuania) Aurelijus Staponka
- (Latvia) Dmitrijs Suvorovs
- (Latvia) Jurijs Žigajevs
- (Lithuania) Andrius Urbšys
- (Lithuania) Audrius Veikutis
- (Latvia) Aleksejs Višņakovs
