= 2008 Baltic League =

Football club tournament held between the top clubs from Baltic states

Baltic League
- Season: 2008
- Dates: 4 March – 25 October
- Champions: (Lithuania) FBK Kaunas
- Matches played: 37
- Goals scored: 113 (3.05 per match)
- Top goalscorer: (Latvia) Aleksandrs Cauņa (8)

The 2008 Baltic League (known as the 2008 Triobet Baltic League for sponsorship reasons) was the second Baltic League football tournament. The tournament took place in the Baltic states in 2008. The first matches took place on 4 March.

The draw for the 2008 Baltic League took place in Riga, Latvia, on 12 January 2008.

== Group stage ==
=== Group A ===
Team	Pld	W	D	L	GF	GA	GD	Pts	Qualification
(Latvia) FK Rīga	4	3	0	1	8	4	+4	9	Advance to the quarter-finals
(Lithuania) FK Ekranas	4	3	0	1	7	6	+1	9	Advance to the quarter-finals
(Estonia) TVMK	4	0	0	4	2	7	−5	0	Eliminated from competition

2008-03-04	FK Ekranas (Lithuania)	1 – 0	(Estonia) TVMK	Vilnius
	Tomkevičius 80'	Report		Stadium: Sportima Sports Hall; Attendance: 400; Referee: Aleksandrs Golubevs (Latvia)

2008-03-11	TVMK (Estonia)	0 – 1	(Latvia) FK Rīga	Tallinn
		Report	Koļesņikovs 2'	Stadium: Sportland Arena; Attendance: 200; Referee: N. Dunauskas (Lithuania)

2008-03-18	FK Rīga (Latvia)	4 – 1	(Lithuania) FK Ekranas	Riga
	Chirkin 58'; Kalonas 66'; Miholaps 82' 88'	Report	Varnas 5'	Stadium: Daugava Stadium; Referee: Eiko Saar (Estonia)

2008-04-01	FK Ekranas (Lithuania)	2 – 1	(Latvia) FK Rīga
	Varnas 75'; Gleveckas 84'	Report	Miholaps 53'	Referee: Hannes Kaasik (Estonia)

2008-04-08	FK Rīga (Latvia)	2 – 1	(Estonia) TVMK	Riga
	Koļesņikovs 29'; Žatkins 53'	Report	Kissel 90+2'	Stadium: Daugava Stadium; Referee: Saulius Atmanavičius (Lithuania)

2008-05-20	TVMK (Estonia)	1 – 3	(Lithuania) FK Ekranas	Kuusalu
	Mašitšev 7'	Report	Trakys 35' 72'; Kavaliauskas 64'	Stadium: Kuusalu Stadium; Referee: Aleksandrs Golubevs (Latvia)

=== Group B ===
Team	Pld	W	D	L	GF	GA	GD	Pts	Qualification
(Latvia) Skonto FC	4	4	0	0	16	4	+12	12	Advance to the quarter-finals
(Lithuania) FK Sūduva	4	1	1	2	4	10	−6	4	Advance to the quarter-finals
(Estonia) Levadia	4	0	1	3	4	10	−6	1	Eliminated from competition

2008-03-04	FK Sūduva (Lithuania)	2 – 0	(Estonia) Levadia	Marijampolė
	Maciulevičius 24'; Mikuckis 53'	Report		Stadium: Marijampolė Stadium; Attendance: 600; Referee: V. Direktorenko (Latvia)

2008-03-12	Levadia (Estonia)	1 – 3	(Latvia) Skonto FC	Tallinn
	Lemsalu 57'	Report	Perepļotkins 28' 85'; Piaček 78'	Stadium: Maarjamäe artificial pitch Attendance: 150; Referee: A. Kancleris (Lithuania)

2008-03-19	Skonto FC (Latvia)	3 – 0	(Lithuania) FK Sūduva	Riga
	Laizāns 10'; Dvalishvili 45'; Višņakovs 81'	Report		Stadium: Skonto stadions Referee: Sten Kaldma (Estonia)

2008-04-01	FK Sūduva (Lithuania)	1 – 6	(Latvia) Skonto FC	Marijampolė
	Willer 71' (pen.)	Report	Piaček 44'; Višņakovs 45'; Pahars 53'; Dvalishvili 67' (pen.); Perepļotkins 69'; Cauņa 88'	Stadium: Marijampolė Stadium; Referee: Margus Kotter (Estonia)

2008-04-09	Skonto FC (Latvia)	4 – 2	(Estonia) Levadia	Riga
	Cauņa 15'; Laizāns 53'; Blanks 60'; Kozlovs 81'	Report	Pavlikhin 56' 68'	Stadium: Skonto stadions Referee: Nerius Dunauskas (Lithuania)

2008-05-20	Levadia (Estonia)	1 – 1	(Lithuania) FK Sūduva	Tallinn
	Puri 4'	Report	Maciulevičius 90'	Stadium: Kadrioru Stadium; Referee: Vadims Černikovs (Latvia)

=== Group C ===
Team	Pld	W	D	L	GF	GA	GD	Pts	Qualification
(Latvia) Liepājas Metalurgs	4	2	1	1	7	2	+5	7	Advance to the quarter-finals
(Lithuania) FBK Kaunas	4	2	1	1	6	4	+2	7	Advance to the quarter-finals
(Estonia) Narva Trans	4	1	0	3	3	10	−7	3	Eliminated from competition

2008-03-04	Narva Trans (Estonia)	2 – 1	(Lithuania) FBK Kaunas	Tallinn
	Lõsanov 67'; Dubõkin 88' (pen.)	Report	Fattakhov 90+3'	Stadium: Sportland Arena; Attendance: 30; Referee: A. Sipailo (Latvia)

2008-03-11	Liepājas Metalurgs (Latvia)	4 – 0	(Estonia) Narva Trans	Liepājas
	Soloņicins 9'; Bleidelis 54' 86'; Klimek 67'	Report		Stadium: Daugava Stadium; Attendance: 750; Referee: S. Atmanaviĉius (Lithuania)

2008-03-18	FBK Kaunas (Lithuania)	1 – 0	(Latvia) Liepājas Metalurgs	Vilnius
	Podelis 14'	Report		Stadium: Žalgiris Stadium; Referee: M. Kotter (Estonia)

2008-04-01	Liepājas Metalurgs (Latvia)	1 – 1	(Lithuania) FBK Kaunas	Liepājas
	Beniušis 27'	Report	Mendy 87'	Stadium: Daugava Stadium; Referee: Kristo Tohver (Estonia)

2008-04-09	Narva Trans (Estonia)	0 – 2	(Latvia) Liepājas Metalurgs
		Report	Beniušis 44'; Ivanovs 47' (pen.)	Referee: Edmundas Gaigalas (Lithuania)

2008-05-20	FBK Kaunas (Lithuania)	3 – 1	(Estonia) Narva Trans	Kaunas
	Ledesma 36' 42' (pen.); Zubavičius 72' (pen.)	Report	Ivanov 90+3'	Stadium: S. Darius and S. Girėnas Stadium; Referee: Romans Lajuks (Latvia)

=== Group D ===
Team	Pld	W	D	L	GF	GA	GD	Pts	Qualification
(Latvia) FK Ventspils	4	3	0	1	5	1	+4	9	Advance to the quarter-finals
(Lithuania) FK Žalgiris	4	3	0	1	3	2	+1	9	Advance to the quarter-finals
(Estonia) Flora	4	0	0	4	0	5	−5	0	Eliminated from competition

2008-03-05	Flora (Estonia)	0 – 1	(Lithuania) FK Žalgiris	Tallinn
		Report	Veikutis 12'	Stadium: Sportland Arena; Attendance: 200; Referee: R. Lajuks (Latvia)

2008-03-11	FK Ventspils (Latvia)	2 – 0	(Estonia) Flora	Ventspils
	Lazdiņš 1'; Aleksandr Mysikov 76'	Report		Stadium: Ventspils Olimpiskais Stadions; Attendance: 200; Referee: G. Mažeika (Lithuania)

2008-03-18	FK Žalgiris (Lithuania)	1 – 0	(Latvia) FK Ventspils
	Kalaydzhiev 11'	Report		Referee: Silver Kõiv (Estonia)

2008-04-01	FK Ventspils (Latvia)	2 – 0	(Lithuania) FK Žalgiris	Ventspils
	Bespalovs 2'; Kosmačovs 48'	Report		Stadium: Ventspils Olimpiskais Stadions; Referee: Eiko Saar (Estonia)

2008-04-08	Flora (Estonia)	0 – 1	(Latvia) FK Ventspils	Tallinn
		Report	Bespalovs 61'	Stadium: Sportland Arena; Referee: Audrius Zuta (Lithuania)

2008-05-20	FK Žalgiris (Lithuania)	1 – 0	(Estonia) Flora	Vilnius
	Kalaydzhiev 44'	Report		Stadium: Žalgiris Stadium; Referee: Aleksandrs Golubevs (Latvia)

== Knockout stage ==
=== Bracket ===
Quarter-finals
(Latvia) FK Rīga	5
(Latvia) Liepājas Metalurgs	3
(Lithuania) FK Žalgiris	3
(Latvia) Skonto FC	6
(Lithuania) FBK Kaunas	8
(Lithuania) FK Ekranas	3
(Latvia) FK Ventspils	4
(Lithuania) FK Sūduva	0

Semi-finals
(Latvia) FK Rīga	2
(Latvia) Skonto FC	8
(Lithuania) FBK Kaunas	2
(Latvia) FK Ventspils	1

Final
(Latvia) Skonto FC	1
(Lithuania) FBK Kaunas	2

=== Quarter-finals ===
2008-06-04	Liepājas Metalurgs (Latvia)	2 – 3	(Latvia) FK Rīga	Liepāja
18:00	Grebis 9'; Klimek 74'	Report	Chirkin 34'; Miholaps 41', 63'	Stadium: Daugava Stadium; Referee: Audrius Kancleris (Lithuania)

2008-07-02	FK Rīga (Latvia)	2 – 1	(Latvia) Liepājas Metalurgs	Riga
18:00	Ļeonovs 65'; Shpakov 71'	Report	Rubins 90+2'	Stadium: Latvijas Universitates Stadions; Referee: Paulius Malžinskas (Lithuania)

FK Rīga win 5–3 on aggregate

2008-06-04	FK Žalgiris (Lithuania)	2 – 4	(Latvia) Skonto FC	Vilnius
18:00	Puotkalis 24' 65' (pen.)	Report	Cauņa 15' 83'; Kožans 38'; Pahars 74' (pen.)	Stadium: Žalgiris Stadium; Referee: Kristo Tohver (Estonia)

2008-07-02	Skonto FC (Latvia)	2 – 1	(Lithuania) FK Žalgiris	Riga
20:00	Cauņa 57'; Perepļotkins 70'	Report	Puotkalis 75'	Stadium: Skonto Stadions; Referee: Hannes Kaasik (Estonia)

Skonto FC win 6–3 on aggregate

2008-06-03	FK Ekranas (Lithuania)	2 – 4	(Lithuania) FBK Kaunas	Panevėžys
18:30	Bicka 83' (pen.); Matovic 90+4'	Report	Ledesma 11'; L. Aničič 14' 45'; Mrowiec 90+3' (pen.)	Stadium: Aukštaitija Stadium; Referee: Romans Lajuks (Latvia)

2008-07-02	FBK Kaunas (Lithuania)	4 – 1	(Lithuania) FK Ekranas	Kaunas
19:00	Zubavičius 7'; Ledesma 45' 65'; Lukša 69'	Report	Trakys 89'	Stadium: S.Darius and S.Girėnas; Referee: Andrejs Sipailo (Latvia)

FBK Kaunas win 8–3 on aggregate

2008-06-04	FK Ventspils (Latvia)	3 – 0	(Lithuania) FK Sūduva	Ventspils
18:00	Lazdiņš 33' (pen.); Smirnov 52'; Bespalovs 59'	Report		Stadium: Ventspils Olimpiskais Stadions; Referee: Silver Kõivo (Estonia)

2008-07-02	FK Sūduva (Lithuania)	0 – 1	(Latvia) FK Ventspils	Marijampolė
19:00		Report	Aleksandr Mysikov 59'	Stadium: Sūduva stadium Referee: Eiko Saar (Estonia)

FK Ventspils win 4–0 on aggregate

=== Semi-finals ===
2008-09-17	FK Rīga (Latvia)	2 – 3	(Latvia) Skonto FC	Riga
18:00	Žavoronkovs 26'; Zenkovs 39'	Report	Dvalishvili 33'; Cauņa 47'; Laizāns 51'	Stadium: Daugava Stadium; Attendance: 150; Referee: Paulius Malžinskas (Lithuania)

2008-09-23	Skonto FC (Latvia)	5 – 0	(Latvia) FK Rīga	Riga
20:10	Golubevs 14'; Blanks 25'; Cauņa 61' 71' (pen.); Laizāns 86'	Report		Stadium: Skonto stadions Referee: Audrius Žuta (Lithuania)

Skonto FC win 8–2 on aggregate

2008-09-24	FBK Kaunas (Lithuania)	1 – 1	(Latvia) FK Ventspils	Vilnius
19:30	Valskis 81'	Report	Ziziļevs 50'	Stadium: Žalgiris Stadium; Referee: Kristo Tohver (Estonia)

2008-10-08	FK Ventspils (Latvia)	0 – 1	(Lithuania) FBK Kaunas	Ventspils
15:00		Report	Valskis 30'	Stadium: Ventspils Olimpiskais Stadions; Referee: Silver Kõiv (Estonia)

FBK Kaunas win 2–1 on aggregate

== Final ==
2008-10-25	Skonto FC (Latvia)	1 – 2	(Lithuania) FBK Kaunas	Riga
15:00	Dvališvili 84' (pen.)	Report	Aničič 24'; Miklinevičius 27'	Stadium: Skonto stadions Attendance: 7,000; Referee: Hannes Kaasik (Estonia)

== Top scorers ==
8 goals:

- (Latvia) Aleksandrs Cauņa

5 goals:

- (Brazil) Rafael Ledesma
- (Latvia) Mihails Miholaps

4 goals:

- (Georgia (country)) Vladimir Dvalishvili
- (Latvia) Oļegs Laizāns
- (Latvia) Andrejs Perepļotkins

3 goals:

- (Croatia) Luka Aničič
- (Latvia) Vladimirs Bespalovs
- (Lithuania) Andrius Puotkalis
- (Lithuania) Valdas Trakys

2 goals:

- (Lithuania) Ričardas Beniušis
- (Latvia) Kristaps Blanks
- (Latvia) Imants Bleidelis
- (Russia) Grigoriy Chirkin
- (Bulgaria) Georgi Kalaydzhiev
- (Poland) Arkadiusz Klimek
- (Latvia) Aleksejs Koļesņikovs
- (Latvia) Artis Lazdiņš
- (Lithuania) Darius Maciulevičius
- (Russia) Aleksandr Mysikov
- (Latvia) Marians Pahars
- (Russia) Aleksandr Pavlihhin
- (Slovakia) Jozef Piaček
- (Lithuania) Vygantas Zubavičius
- (Lithuania) Nerijus Valskis
- (Lithuania) Egidijus Varnas
- (Latvia) Aleksejs Višņakovs
