= Nerijus Radžius =

Lithuanian footballer

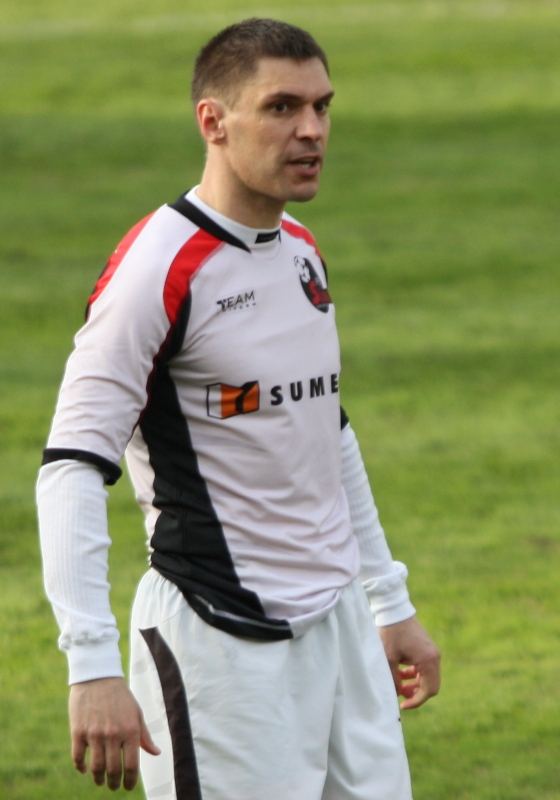

Personal information
- Date of birth: 27 August 1976 (age 50)
- Place of birth: Akmenė, Lithuanian SSR, Soviet Union
- Height: 1.85 m (6 ft 1 in)
- Position: Defender

Youth career
- –1995: Cementininkas Naujoji Akmenė

Senior career*
Years	Team	Apps	(Gls)
1995–2000	Žalgiris	66	(2)
2000–2003	Zaglebie Lubin	59	(6)
2003–2004	Chernomorets Novorossiysk	24	(0)
2005	Volgar-Gazprom-2 Astrakhan	29	(0)
2006–2008	FBK Kaunas	81	(4)
2009–2010	ŁKS Łódź	17	(1)
2010–2013	Sūduva	105	(7)

International career
1997–2009	Lithuania	11	(0)
- * Club domestic league appearances and goals

Nerijus Radžius (born 27 August 1976) is a Lithuanian former professional footballer who played as a defender.

== Career ==
On 5 August 2008, he scored a 30-yard free-kick against Rangers in the second-leg of the second qualifying round of the UEFA Champions League which helped knock-out the Scottish side in a 2–1 win for FBK Kaunas.

== Honours ==
Žalgiris

- A Lyga: 1998–99
- Lithuanian Cup: 1996–97

FBK Kaunas

- A Lyga: 2006, 2007
- Lithuanian Cup: 2007–08
- Baltic League: 2008
