= Pāvels Surņins =

Latvian footballer

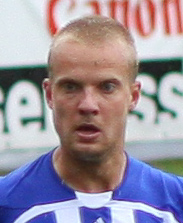
- Surņins playing for Liepājas Metalurgs

Personal information
- Full name: Pāvels Surņins
- Date of birth: 4 August 1985 (age 41)
- Place of birth: Liepāja, Latvia, USSR (now Republic of Latvia)
- Height: 1.80 m (5 ft 11 in)
- Position: Midfielder

Youth career
- Liepājas Metalurgs

Senior career*
Years	Team	Apps	(Gls)
2005	Liepājas Metalurgs-2	?	(?)
2006–2012	Liepājas Metalurgs	131	(5)

International career^{‡}
2005–2006	Latvia Under-21	?	(?)
2007	Latvia	2	(0)
- * Club domestic league appearances and goals as of 29 March 2013 ‡ National team caps and goals as of 29 March 2013

Pāvels Surņins (born 4 August 1985 in Liepāja, Latvia) is a Latvian former professional football midfielder, who spent all his career with FK Liepājas Metalurgs in the Latvian Higher League.

== Club career ==
Surņins played for FK Liepājas Metalurgs-2 in 2005 in the 1.līga, the second tier in Latvian football, scoring five goals, as well as making seven appearances for FK Liepājas Metalurgs in the Virslīga.

In the 2006 season he played 28 games for Liepājas Metalurgs in the Virslīga as well as one game in the Latvian Cup, the semi-final match against FC Skonto which they won 2–1. He made two substitute appearances in both legs of the 2007 Baltic League Final.

Surņins retired from professional football before the start of 2013 due to long-term injury problems. In March 2016 he signed for Hyde United.

== International career ==
Surņins played for the Latvian Under-21s. In September 2006 he was called into the Latvian squad for the UEFA Euro 2008 qualifiers against Iceland and Northern Ireland by national coach, Jurijs Andrejevs. He made his international debut in 2007.

== Honours ==
Club

- Virsliga runner-up: (2) 2006, 2007
- Latvian Cup winner (1) 2006
- Baltic League winner: (1) 2007
