= Vygantas Zubavičius =

Lithuanian footballer

Personal information
- Full name: Vygantas Zubavičius
- Date of birth: 14 November 1984 (age 41)
- Place of birth: Lithuanian SSR
- Height: 1.86 m (6 ft 1 in)
- Position: Midfielder

Senior career*
Years	Team	Apps	(Gls)
2003–2004	Rodovitas Klaipeda		
2005–2009	FBK Kaunas	25	(1)
2005	→ Kauno Jėgeriai (loan)		
2005–2007	→ Šilutė (loan)	41	(0)
2009	→ Šilutė (loan)	12	(1)
2009	MTZ-RIPO Minsk	6	(0)
2010	Sillamäe Kalev	21	(3)
2011	Tauras Tauragė	14	(0)
2011	Znicz Pruszków	3	(0)
2012	Atlantas	8	(0)
2012–2014	Makkabi Berlin		
- * Club domestic league appearances and goals

Vygantas Zubavičius (born 14 November 1984) is a Lithuanian former professional footballer who played as a midfielder.

== Career ==
He had a trial spell with Scottish club Heart of Midlothian F.C., but failed to win a contract.

== Honours ==
FBK Kaunas

- A Lyga: 2007
- Lithuanian Cup: 2007–08
- Baltic League: 2008
