= Eduards Višņakovs =

Latvian footballer

Personal information
- Date of birth: 10 May 1990 (age 36)
- Place of birth: Riga, Latvian SSR, Soviet Union
- Height: 1.90 m (6 ft 3 in)
- Position: Forward

Youth career
- –2003: JFC Skonto
- 2003–2007: Daugava Rīga

Senior career*
Years	Team	Apps	(Gls)
2008–2009	Daugava-90 Rīga	30	(30)
2009–2012	Ventspils	74	(25)
2009	→ Tranzīts (loan)	19	(3)
2012–2013	Shakhter Karagandy	20	(4)
2013–2014	Widzew Łódź	38	(12)
2014–2015	Ruch Chorzów	33	(6)
2015–2017	Westerlo	16	(2)
2016–2017	→ Ruch Chorzów (loan)	15	(1)
2017–2018	Rīgas Futbola Skola	10	(4)
2019–2020	Shakhtyor Soligorsk	3	(0)
2020	→ Spartaks Jūrmala (loan)	8	(0)
2021	CSM Reșița	12	(2)
2021	Pogoń Siedlce	13	(0)
2022	GKS Wikielec	16	(2)
2022–2024	Super Nova	47	(4)
2025	Riga Mariners	26	(6)

International career
2008–2009	Latvia U19	10	(1)
2010–2012	Latvia U21	18	(2)
2013–2017	Latvia	15	(0)
- * Club domestic league appearances and goals

Eduards Višņakovs (born 10 May 1990) is a Latvian former professional footballer who played as a forward.

== Club career ==
=== Early career ===
Born in Riga, as a youth player Višņakovs played for his local club JFC Skonto till 2003, when he moved to Daugava Rīga. Being taken to the first team in 2008, Višņakovs scored 30 goals in 30 Latvian First League appearances, becoming the top scorer of the league and helping his team clinch an automatic promotion to the Latvian Higher League. He was also named the league's best player in a ceremony on 22 December 2008.

=== FK Ventspils ===
Before the start of the 2009 Latvian Higher League season Višņakovs refused to extend his contract with Daugava, joining that time Latvian champions FK Ventspils. Right after joining, Višņakovs was sent on loan to the league's newcomers FC Tranzit in order to get more experience. During this loan spell, Višņakovs scored three goals in 19 league matches, before returning from loan in August 2009. During his time at FK Ventspils, Višņakovs scored 25 goals in 74 league matches, helping the team lift all the possible trophies of the country, including Baltic League in 2010, Latvian Higher League and Latvian Cup in 2011. Višņakovs also participated in the 2009–10 UEFA Europa League group stage.

=== Shakhter Karagandy ===
In June 2012, Višņakovs moved to the Kazakhstan Premier League champions Shakhter Karagandy. He scored his first league goal for the club on 9 July 2012 in a 5–1 victory over FC Zhetysu. All in all, Višņakovs participated in 20 league matches, scoring four goals. He helped his team become the champions of Kazakhstan in 2012 and win the Kazakhstan Super Cup in 2013.

=== Widzew Łódź ===
In July 2013, Višņakovs went on trial with Polish Ekstraklasa club Widzew Łódź and signed a one-year contract with them. He scored both goals in a 2–1 victory over Zawisza Bydgoszcz on his debut for the club. In his second match for Widzew, Višņakovs yet again scored both goals, securing a 2–1 victory over Korona Kielce. On 18 August 2013, Višņakovs scored the only goal in a 1–0 Polish Cup over Ursus Warsaw. On 25 August 2013, Višņakovs scored his fifth goal of the season in a 3–1 loss against Śląsk Wrocław. He scored his sixth goal of the season on 6 October 2013 in a 4-1 victory over Lechia Gdańsk. Višņakovs scored his seventh and eighth goal of the season, respectively, in a 3–1 loss to Zagłębie Lubin and a 2–1 victory over Pogoń Szczecin on 19 October and 2 November 2013. At the start of December 2013, Višņakovs extended his contract with Widzew till June 2016. In total, he scored 12 goals in 36 league matches that season and was reportedly close to a move to the German Bundesliga, while Widzew were relegated from the Ekstraklasa.

=== 2014 transfer saga ===
In December 2013, it was reported that Widzew had rejected an offer of €450,000 for Višņakovs from the Polish champions Legia Warsaw. Having been previously linked with a possible move to either FC St. Pauli, Hamburger SV, SC Freiburg or Schalke 04, Višņakovs finally went on trial with Russian Premier League club Torpedo Moscow in July 2014, the only team ready to pay the transfer fee requested by Widzew. Višņakovs himself stated that his priority was the German Bundesliga but that Lech Poznań, who were also interested in the player, was an alternative.

=== Ruch Chorzów ===
On 28 August 2014, Višņakovs officially moved to the Polish Ekstraklasa club Ruch Chorzów, signing a three-year contract. He made his debut for Ruch on 31 August 2014 in a 3–3 draw against Lechia Gdańsk, coming on as a substitute and scoring a goal.

== International career ==
Eduards Višņakovs has represented Latvia at U-19 and U-21 levels. He participated and scored a goal in the U-23 friendly match against Estonia on 5 June 2013, helping his team secure a 2–0 victory. On 10 September 2013 the U-23 team beat England 1-0, with Višņakovs scoring his second goal in two matches. Višņakovs was firstly called up to Latvia national football team for the FIFA World Cup 2014 qualifying matches against Lithuania and Slovakia on 11 and 15 October 2013. He made his debut for the national team in the match against Lithuania, coming on as a substitute in the 77th minute and replacing Māris Verpakovskis. A local scandal arose when Widzew refused to fulfill its previously given promise to the Latvian Football Federation and did not allow Višņakovs to join the national team for the Baltic Cup matches in May 2014. Resentment was expressed by the Latvian Football Federation and the player himself but Latvia, eventually, went on to win the tournament without the help of Višņakovs. In September 2014, prior to the UEFA Euro 2016 qualifying match against Kazakhstan, Višņakovs revealed that while he was playing for Shakhter Karagandy he was urged to take on Kazakhstani citizenship but despite not being on the radar of Latvia national team at the time, he had declined the offers stating that he would only play internationally for Latvia.

== Personal life ==
His elder brother Aleksejs is also a professional footballer. While Eduards was a part of FK Ventspils squad, they also played together. In 2013 they became the second pair of brothers to play for Widzew together after Lithuanians Artūras and Igoris Steško during the 2001-2002 season.

== Career statistics ==
Appearances and goals by national team and year
National team	Year	Apps	Goals
Latvia
Latvia	2013	3	0
Latvia	2014	6	0
Latvia	2015	5	0
Latvia	2017	1	0
Total		15	0

== Honours ==
Daugava

- Latvian First League: 2008

Ventspils

- Latvian Higher League: 2011
- Latvian Cup: 2010–11
- Baltic League: 2009–10

Shakhter Karagandy

- Kazakhstan Premier League: 2012
- Kazakhstan Super Cup: 2013

GKS Wikielec

- Polish Cup (Warmia-Masuria regionals): 2021–22

Individual

- Latvian First League top scorer: 2008 (30 goals)
