= Alfredas =

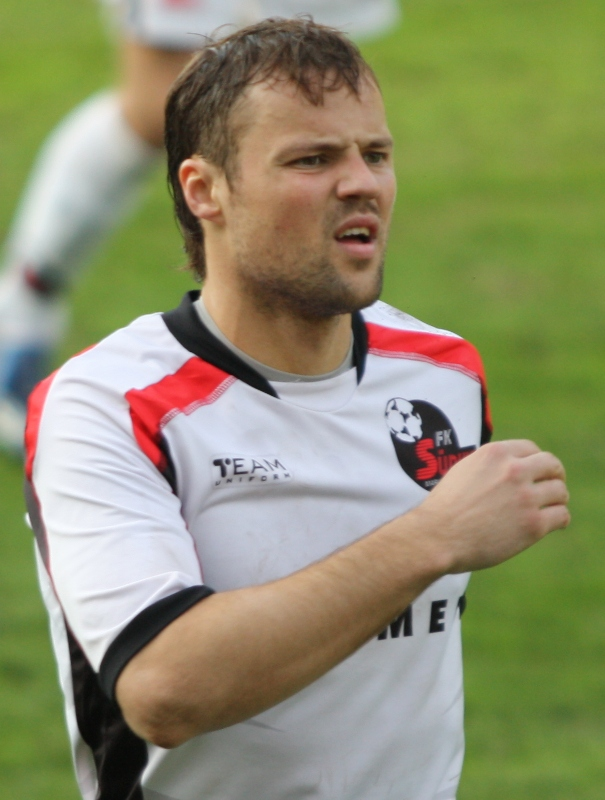
- Alfredas Skroblas
- Gender: Male

Origin
- Origin: Alfred
- Region of origin: Lithuania

Alfredas is a Lithuanian masculine given name and may refer to:

- Alfredas Bumblauskas (born 1956), Lithuanian historian
- Alfredas Kulpa-Kulpavičius (1923–2007), Lithuanian architect and artist
- Alfredas Naujokas (1911–1966), SS-Sturmbannführer
- Alfredas Skroblas (born 1984), Lithuanian football player
