= Andrius Šidlauskas =

Andrius Šidlauskas may refer to:

- Andrius Šidlauskas (footballer) (born 1984), Lithuanian football player
- Andrius Šidlauskas (swimmer) (born 1997), Lithuanian swimmer
