= Ģirts Karlsons =

Latvian footballer

Personal information
- Date of birth: 7 June 1981 (age 45)
- Place of birth: Liepāja, Latvian SSR, Soviet Union (now Republic of Latvia)
- Height: 1.89 m (6 ft 2 in)
- Position: Forward

Youth career
- Liepājas Metalurgs

Senior career*
Years	Team	Apps	(Gls)
1998–2003	Liepājas Metalurgs	96	(40)
2004	Shinnik Yaroslavl	8	(0)
2005	Venta	6	(0)
2005–2007	Liepājas Metalurgs	65	(34)
2008	De Graafschap	5	(0)
2008–2009	Liepājas Metalurgs	32	(24)
2009–2012	Inter Baku	73	(36)
2012–2013	Liepājas Metalurgs	19	(9)
2013	Pro Duta	20	(15)
2014	Neman Grodno	9	(1)
2014–2017	Ventspils	75	(35)
2017–2018	Liepāja	28	(14)
Total		436	(208)

International career
2003–2017	Latvia	51	(9)
- * Club domestic league appearances and goals

Ģirts Karlsons (born 7 June 1981) is a Latvian former professional footballer who played as a forward.

== Club career ==
As a youth player Karlsons played for his local club Liepājas Metalurgs, being taken to the first team in 1998, at the age of 17. He spent the next six seasons with the club, becoming the second top scorer of the Latvian Higher League in 2003 with 26 goals, completing two hat-tricks during the season. All in all he played 96 matches for his local club, scoring 40 goals. After these bright appearances he had impressed clubs abroad, and in January 2004 Karlsons went on a month-long trial with the Russian Premier League club Shinnik Yaroslavl. Afterwards he signed a three-year contract with them.

However, his spell there was not as successful as expected and was very short. After just one season, during which he played only 8 league matches without scoring goals, Karlsons returned to the Latvian Higher League, signing with the newly promoted, ambitious club Venta Kuldiga in 2005. However, the club struggled financially and after just five matches had to let some of their players go, including Karlsons, who returned to his hometown club, Liepājas Metalurgs later that year. He spent the next three seasons there, once again showing great performance. He scored a hat-trick in the 2005 season, and he also scored in the Latvian Cup final on 25 September 2005, which Metalurgs lost 2–1 to Venta Kuldīga.

Another hat-trick came in the 2006 season, which Karlsons finished as the second top scorer with 14 goals. In the Latvian Cup he scored a hat-trick in the 6–1 semi-final victory over Dižvanagi Rēzekne and then scored in the final, which the club won 2–1 over Skonto Riga. In December 2006 Karlsons was named the runner-up of the Latvian Player of the Year Award by the Latvian Football Federation behind the winner Aleksandrs Koliņko, who that time was the first-choice keeper for Rubin Kazan in the Russian Premier League. His contract with Metalurgs expired in July 2007 and it was not renewed. Player was then linked with the English Championship club Bristol City, before going on trial with Southampton. In January 2008 he had a two-day trial with Wolverhampton Wanderers. Karlsons then had trials in the Netherlands with Zwolle and De Graafschap, and on 8 February 2008 he signed for De Graafschap, which that time competed in the Eredivisie. Karlsons returned to Liepājas Metalurgs in the middle of 2008, because of limited game time. After some impressive matches there he attracted interest from several European clubs, but finally settled down in Azerbaijan, signing a contract with Inter Baku in the summer of 2009.

The next season, he became the champion of Azerbaijan. He scored 8 goals in 19 matches for Inter in his first season there, but the next two were not that successful anymore and in July 2012 he was released. In August 2012 Karlsons once again returned to Liepājas Metalurgs. The 2012 season saw Karlsons scoring 9 goals in 19 league matches. Even though Metalurgs expressed their interest to keep him at the club, Karlsons chose to continue his career abroad, joining the Indonesian Premier League club Pro Duta in March 2013. On 14 April 2013, he scored his first two goals in a 3–0 league victory over Bontang. Throughout the season Karlsons scored 15 league goals for the club, completing two hat-tricks. He left Pro Duta at the end of his contract in November 2013. In February 2014 Karlsons went on trial with the Belarusian Premier League club Neman Grodno alongside his international fellow Igors Tarasovs and signed a contract with the club on 26 February 2014. He scored his first Belarusian Premier League goal in a 3–2 victory over Dnepr Mogilev on 19 April 2014. Karlsons left Neman on 9 June 2014 due to family reasons and returned to Latvia. On 3 July 2014, Karlsons signed a contract with the Latvian Higher League title holders FK Ventspils. He helped the club retain the title for the second year in a row.

Karlsons left FK Liepāja at the end of 2018.

== International career ==
Karlsons played for the Latvia-U21. Karlsons made his first appearance for Latvia national team on 20 December 2003 as a second-half substitute against Kuwait in Cyprus, which Latvia lost 2–0. On 28 December 2005 he scored in Latvia's 2–1 win over Oman national football team to reach the final of the King's Cup in Thailand. Latvia won the cup, beating Korea DPR 2–1 in the final on 30 December with Karlsons again scoring. Currently Karlsons has 50 international caps under his belt, having scored 9 goals. He played in an international game on 9 February 2011, a 2–1 victory in a friendly match against Bolivia, coming on as a late substitute, which would be his last match for the national team until late 2016. Karlsons was recalled to the national team in the autumn of 2016, earning his 50th cap on 7 October 2016 after coming on as a substitute in the 0:2 home loss against the Faroe Islands in a 2018 World Cup qualifier.

== Career statistics ==
#	Date	Venue	Opponent	Score	Result	Competition
1.	26 December 2005	Surakul Stadium, Phuket, Thailand	North Korea	1–1	Drew	2005 King's Cup
2.	28 December 2005	Surakul Stadium, Phuket, Thailand	Oman	1–2	Won	2005 King's Cup
3.	30 December 2005	Surakul Stadium, Phuket, Thailand	North Korea	1–2	Won	2005 King's Cup
4.	7 October 2006	Skonto Stadium, Riga, Latvia	Iceland	4–0	Won	Euro 2008 qual.
5.	17 November 2007	Skonto Stadium, Riga, Latvia	Liechtenstein	4–1	Won	Euro 2008 qual.
6.	6 February 2008	Boris Paichadze National Stadium, Tbilisi, Georgia	Georgia	1–3	Won	Friendly
7.	6 September 2008	Sheriff Stadium, Tiraspol, Moldova	Moldova	1–2	Won	2010 World Cup qual.
8.	28 March 2009	Stade Josy Barthel, Luxembourg City, Luxembourg	Luxembourg	0–4	Won	2010 World Cup qual.
9.	3 March 2010	Estádio 11 de Novembro, Luanda, Angola	Angola	1–1	Drew	Friendly
Correct as of 7 October 2015

== Honours ==
Liepājas Metalurgs

- Virslīga: 2005, 2009; runner-up 1998, 1999, 2003, 2006, 2007
- Latvian Cup: 2006
- Baltic League: 2007

Inter Baku

- Azerbaijan Premier League: 2010
- CIS Cup: 2011

Ventspils

- Virslīga: 2014

Latvia

- King's Cup: 2005
- Baltic Cup: 2008

Individual

- CIS Cup top scorer: 2011
- Latvian Higher League best forward: 2006
- Baltic League top scorer: 2007
