= 2005 Latvian Higher League =

Annual soccer tournament

Latvian Higher League
- Season: 2005
- Champions: FK Liepajas Metalurgs
- Relegated: JFK Olimps Riga; FK Venta
- UEFA Champions League: FK Liepajas Metalurgs
- UEFA Cup: Skonto FC; FK Ventspils
- UEFA Intertoto Cup: Dinaburg FC
- Top goalscorer: (Latvia) Igors Slesarcuks (Latvia) Viktors Dobrecovs (18 goals each one)

The 2005 season in the Latvian Higher League, named Virslīga, was the 15th domestic football (soccer) competition since the Baltic nation gained independence from the Soviet Union on 6 September 1991. Eight teams competed in this edition, with FK Liepājas Metalurgs claiming the title.

== Final table ==
Pos	Team	Pld	W	D	L	GF	GA	GD	Pts	Qualification or relegation
1	Liepājas Metalurgs (C)	28	22	5	1	85	19	+66	71	Qualification for Champions League first qualifying round
2	Skonto	28	17	7	4	59	25	+34	58	Qualification for UEFA Cup first qualifying round
3	Ventspils	28	16	7	5	56	30	+26	55	Qualification for UEFA Cup first qualifying round
4	Dinaburg	28	9	8	11	37	43	−6	35	Qualification for Intertoto Cup first round
5	Rīga	28	9	7	12	32	46	−14	34	
6	Jūrmala	28	9	5	14	37	38	−1	32	
7	Olimps Rīga (R)	28	5	4	19	24	68	−44	19	Qualification for relegation play-offs
8	Venta (R)	28	2	3	23	18	79	−61	9	Relegation to Latvian First League

Source: RSSSF
(C) Champions; (R) Relegated

== Match table ==
First half of the season
Home \ Away	DIN	JŪR	MET	OLI	RĪG	SKO	VTA	VEN
Dinaburg		1–0	1–2	3–0	0–0	1–2	1–0	0–1
Jūrmala	1–2		0–1	1–0	3–0	3–2	0–0	2–2
Liepājas Metalurgs	4–2	3–1		3–0	5–1	4–2	5–1	2–0
Olimps Rīga	2–1	0–3	0–6		0–2	1–5	2–1	0–3
Rīga	3–0	3–2	0–1	1–0		0–4	0–2	0–2
Skonto	3–0	3–1	1–1	0–2	0–2		3–0	1–0
Venta	1–3	2–2	0–0	3–0	0–1	0–3		0–1
Ventspils	1–1	1–0	3–0	3–2	0–0	1–3	5–1	

Source: RSSSF
Legend: Blue = home team win; Yellow = draw; Red = away team win.

Second half of the season
Home \ Away	DIN	JŪR	MET	OLI	RĪG	SKO	VTA	VEN
Dinaburg		1–0	2–2	1–1	2–2	1–3	3–0	3–3
Jūrmala	1–0		0–1	4–3	1–0	0–3	4–0	0–1
Liepājas Metalurgs	5–0	1–0		5–0	6–0	1–1	9–0	2–1
Olimps Rīga	1–1	1–1	0–4		0–3	0–1	5–2	0–1
Rīga	1–2	1–1	0–3	1–1		1–1	4–2	1–3
Skonto	1–1	2–1	1–1	3–0	4–0		3–0	1–1
Venta	0–3	2–4	1–3	0–2	0–4	0–1		0–6
Ventspils	3–1	2–1	1–5	6–1	1–1	2–2	2–0	

Source: RSSSF
Legend: Blue = home team win; Yellow = draw; Red = away team win.

== Relegation play-offs ==
11 November 2005

Olimps Rīga	0 – 2	Ditton
		Pertia 52'; Modebadze 90+2'

Riga
Attendance: 500

Source: RSSSF

== Top scorers ==
Rank	Player	Club	Goals
1	Igors Sļesarčuks (LAT)	FK Venta / FK Ventspils	18
1	Viktors Dobrecovs (LAT)	FK Liepājas Metalurgs	18
3	Aleksandr Katasonov (RUS)	FK Liepājas Metalurgs	17
4	Gatis Kalniņš (LAT)	Skonto FC	15
5	Genādijs Soloņicins (LAT)	FK Liepājas Metalurgs	13

Source: RSSSF

== Awards ==
Best	Name	Team
Goalkeeper	Andrejs Piedels (LAT)	Skonto FC
Defender	Dzintars Zirnis (LAT)	FK Liepājas Metalurgs
Midfielder	Genādijs Soloņicins (LAT)	FK Liepājas Metalurgs
Forward	Aleksandr Katasonov (RUS)	FK Liepājas Metalurgs
