= Mindaugas Kalonas =

Lithuanian footballer (born 1984)

Personal information
- Date of birth: 28 February 1984 (age 42)
- Place of birth: Varėna, Lithuanian SSR, Soviet Union
- Height: 1.71 m (5 ft 7 in)
- Position: Midfielder

Youth career
- 1993–1998: Vilnius FM
- 1998–2001: FC Sportakademklub Moscow

Senior career*
Years	Team	Apps	(Gls)
2001–2002	Dinamo Moscow	0	(0)
2003–2004	Rubin Kazan	0	(0)
2004	Braga	0	(0)
2005–2007	Liepājas Metalurgs	68	(18)
2007	Kuban Krasnodar	1	(0)
2008	FK Riga	11	(2)
2008	Bohemians	12	(6)
2009–2011	FC Metalurh Zaporizhya	31	(1)
2012–2013	Stomil Olsztyn	17	(5)
2013	Ravan Baku	13	(8)
2013–2014	Baku	17	(6)
2014	→ Simurq (loan)	5	(0)
2014	Hapoel Haifa	9	(1)
2015	Skonto	6	(1)
2015	Ravan Baku	0	(0)
2015	Hapoel Nazareth Illit	1	(0)
2016	Žalgiris Kaunas	5	(1)
2016	Sioni Bolnisi	1	(0)
2017	Sillamäe Kalev	2	(0)
2017	RKSV Cito	2	(2)
2017–2018	Oroklini	9	(1)
2018	LDZ Cargo/DFA		
Total		210	(52)

International career
2006–2014	Lithuania	49	(3)
- * Club domestic league appearances and goals

Mindaugas Kalonas (born 28 February 1984) is a Lithuanian former professional footballer who played as a midfielder.

== Club career ==
Kalonas played in the youth teams of Dynamo Moscow, then moved to Rubin Kazan, before having a spell at Portuguese club S.C. Braga. But at neither club he made it through to the first team. He then moved to Latvia where he played with FHK Liepājas Metalurgs, who went on to win the 2006 Virslīga. In the following season, Kalonaswon the Latvian Cup with his team and placed second in the league.

After a spell with Kuban Krasnodar, he signed for FK Riga in January 2008. In July 2008, his club played against Bohemian F.C. in the UEFA Intertoto Cup, where Kalonas impressed Bohs manager Pat Fenlon. On 31 July 2008, he signed a contract with Bohemian F.C. until the end of the season and made his debut for the Gypsies in 3–0 win over Cobh Ramblers at Dalymount Park on 1 August. Kalonas adapted well to the League of Ireland and netted his first goal for Bohs in a 2–0 win over Galway United on 22 August. He quickly became a fan favourite, netting the winner in a game against rivals Shamrock Rovers and the deciding penalty in a shoot-out to claim The Double in the FAI Cup Final against Derry City. He also became the first Lithuanian to play in an FAI Cup Final.

In 2009, he signed a three-year contract with Metalurh Zaporizhya. In his two and a half years at the club, Kalonas played 31 games and scored one goal, which came against Metalurh Donetsk. On 23 July 2012, Kalonas joined Polish I liga side Stomil Olsztyn.

In January 2013, Kalonas joined Azerbaijan Premier League side Ravan Baku, scoring eight goals in 13 league games. At the end of the 2012–13 season Kalonas moved to FC Baku. In November 2013, Kalonas was named Lithuanian Footballer of the Year 2013. On 4 February 2014, Kalonas joined Simurq PIK on loan for the remainder of the 2013–14 season.

On 10 June 2014, Kalonas joined Hapoel Haifa on a two-year contract. After only six-months in Israel, Kalonas returned to Latvia, signing a one-year contract with Virslīga side Skonto FC. Kalonas was released by Skonto FC in June 2015, just two months after arriving at the club.

In August 2015, Kalonas signed for his former club Ravan Baku. However, his contract was cancelled on 20 August 2015, only a few days after his arrival and without having played a match for the club, after manager Emin Quliyev was dissatisfied with his training. In September 2015 he signed to Hapoel Nazareth Illit.

In February 2016, Kalonas signed with Kauno Žalgiris. On 12 March 2016, he debuted for the club in a 0−2 defeat against FK Trakai, which also marked his first ever appearance in the highest league of his home country, the A Lyga. In May 2016, Kauno Žalgiris announced that the contract with Kalonas has been terminated. In August 2016, Kalonas joined Umaglesi Liga side Sioni Bolnisi.

On 1 March 2017, Kalonas joined Estonian Meistriliiga participants Sillamäe Kalev. After two months at the club, his contract was terminated, with head coach Vadym Dobizha citing Kalonas' lacking fitness and discipline as the reasons for his departure.

== International career ==
Kalonas made his debut for the Lithuania national team on 1 March 2006 in a friendly match against Albania. Until 2010, he made 35 appearances for the national team, before being re-called again in 2013. In total, he earned 49 caps for Lithuania, scoring three goals.

== Career statistics ==
=== Club ===
As of 13 March 2015

Appearances and goals by club, season and competition
Club	Season	League			Cup		Continental		Total	
Club	Season	Division	Apps	Goals	Apps	Goals	Apps	Goals	Apps	Goals
Liepājas Metalurgs	2005	Virsliga	27	8			–		27	8
Liepājas Metalurgs	2006	Virsliga	24	4			4	1	28	5
Liepājas Metalurgs	2007	Virsliga	17	6			–		17	6
Liepājas Metalurgs	Total		68	18			4	1	72	19
Kuban Krasnodar	2007	Russian Premier League	1	0			–		1	0
Rīga	2008	Virsliga	11	2			6	2	17	4
Bohemians	2008	League of Ireland	12	6		0	–		12	6
Metalurh Zaporizhya	2008–09	Ukrainian Premier League	11	1	0	0	–		11	1
Metalurh Zaporizhya	2009–10	Ukrainian Premier League	12	0	1	0	–		13	0
Metalurh Zaporizhya	2010–11	Ukrainian Premier League	8	0	0	0	–		8	0
Metalurh Zaporizhya	Total		31	1	1	0	–		32	1
Stomil Olsztyn	2012–13	I liga	17	5	1	1	–		18	6
Ravan Baku	2012–13	Azerbaijan Premier League	13	8	2	0	–		15	8
Baku	2013–14	Azerbaijan Premier League	13	5	1	0	–		14	5
Simurq (loan)	2013–14	Azerbaijan Premier League	6	0	0	0	–		5	1
Hapoel Haifa	2013–14	Israeli Premier League	10	1	5	3	–		15	4
Skonto	2015	Virsliga	0	0	0	0	–		0	0
Career total			182	46	10	4	10	3	202	53

=== International ===
As of match played 5 March 2014

Appearances and goals by national team and year
National team	Year	Apps	Goals
Lithuania	2006	6	0
Lithuania	2007	11	0
Lithuania	2008	10	1
Lithuania	2009	6	1
Lithuania	2010	2	0
Lithuania	2011	0	0
Lithuania	2012	0	0
Lithuania	2013	8	1
Lithuania	2014	1	0
Total		44	3

Scores and results list Lithuania's goal tally first, score column indicates score after each Kalonas goal.

List of international goals scored by Mindaugas Kalonas
No.	Date	Venue	Opponent	Score	Result	Competition
1	6 September 2008	Gruia stadium, Cluj-Napoca, Romania	Romania	3–0	3–0	FIFA World Cup 2010 qualification
2	14 October 2009	Sūduva Stadium, Marijampolė, Lithuania	Serbia	1–0	2–1	FIFA World Cup 2010 qualification
3	18 November 2013	Zimbru Stadium, Chișinău, Moldova	Moldova	1–0	1–1	Friendly

== Honours ==
Liepājas Metalurgs

- Virsliga: 2005; runner-up 2004, 2006, 2007
- Latvian Cup: 2006; runner-up 2005
- Baltic League: 2007

Bohemians

- League of Ireland: 2008
- FAI Cup: 2008
