= 2007 A Lyga =

A Lyga
- Season: 2007
- Dates: 7 April-10 November
- Champions: FBK Kaunas
- Relegated: FK Vilnius; Interas-AE
- UEFA Champions League: FBK Kaunas
- UEFA Cup: FK Suduva; FK Vetra
- UEFA Intertoto Cup: FK Ekranas
- Top goalscorer: (Lithuania) Povilas Luksys (26 goals)

The Lithuanian A Lyga 2007 was the 18th season of top-tier football in Lithuania. The season started on 7 April 2007 and ended on 10 November 2007. 10 teams participated with FBK Kaunas winning the championship.

== League standings ==
Pos	Team	Pld	W	D	L	GF	GA	GD	Pts	Qualification or relegation
1	FBK Kaunas (C)	36	25	8	3	91	26	+65	83	Qualification to Champions League first qualifying round
2	Sūduva	36	20	8	8	66	34	+32	68	Qualification to UEFA Cup first qualifying round
3	Ekranas	36	19	9	8	83	36	+47	66	Qualification to Intertoto Cup first round
4	Žalgiris	36	18	10	8	64	34	+30	64	
5	Vėtra	36	18	7	11	55	30	+25	61	Qualification to UEFA Cup first qualifying round
6	Atlantas	36	13	6	17	54	45	+9	45	
7	Vilnius (R)	36	13	6	17	54	63	−9	45	Relegation to I Lyga
8	Šiauliai	36	13	6	17	47	50	−3	45	
9	Šilutė	36	6	4	26	28	86	−58	22	
10	Interas-AE (R)	36	2	2	32	16	154	−138	8	Defunct after end of season

Source: www2.omnitel.net
(C) Champions; (R) Relegated

== Results ==
=== First half of season ===
Home \ Away	ATL	EKR	FBK	IAE	SŪD	ŠIA	ŠIL	VĖT	VIL	ŽAL
Atlantas		1–1	1–2	0–0	0–1	0–0	0–2	3–1	1–2	1–2
Ekranas	1–2		2–2	6–1	1–1	2–0	6–1	0–0	0–0	4–1
FBK Kaunas	4–0	1–1		8–0	1–1	2–1	4–0	1–2	1–0	1–1
Interas-AE	0–6	0–4	2–3		0–7	1–4	1–1	0–2	0–3	0–2
Sūduva	1–0	1–1	1–1	2–0		0–2	4–1	1–0	1–0	1–1
Šiauliai	1–3	0–1	0–0	4–1	1–3		1–0	2–1	3–0	0–1
Šilutė	1–1	0–5	2–5	3–0	1–3	2–1		0–3	0–2	0–0
Vėtra	2–1	1–0	0–1	3–0	0–0	2–1	3–0		1–2	1–1
Vilnius	1–0	1–2	2–2	4–0	3–1	2–1	4–0	0–0		1–1
Žalgiris	1–1	1–0	1–0	3–2	1–0	1–1	2–0	1–0	1–2	

Legend: Blue = home team win; Yellow = draw; Red = away team win.

=== Second half of season ===
Home \ Away	ATL	EKR	FBK	IAE	SŪD	ŠIA	ŠIL	VĖT	VIL	ŽAL
Atlantas		5–0	0–2	3–0	1–0	0–0	2–0	1–2	1–0	1–3
Ekranas	3–1		1–3	10–0	0–0	2–1	5–0	2–1	3–1	2–0
FBK Kaunas	2–1	2–1		3–0	2–1	4–0	2–0	0–1	6–0	1–1
Interas-AE	0–7	0–6	1–6		2–3	0–7	3–0	0–7	0–5	0–6
Sūduva	1–0	2–1	0–4	5–0		3–0	3–0	1–1	7–1	1–0
Šiauliai	0–2	0–3	1–3	0–2	2–1		2–1	2–1	1–1	0–0
Šilutė	2–3	0–3	1–4	2–0	2–4	1–2		3–0	1–0	0–0
Vėtra	3–1	1–1	0–1	3–0	0–1	1–0	3–1		5–1	2–1
Vilnius	1–4	1–2	0–2	9–0	0–3	2–4	2–0	0–0		0–6
Žalgiris	3–0	4–1	0–5	7–0	4–1	1–2	3–0	0–2	3–1	

Legend: Blue = home team win; Yellow = draw; Red = away team win.

== Top goalscorers ==
Pos.	Player	Club	Goals
1	(Lithuania) Povilas Lukšys	Ekranas	26
2	(Lithuania) Mindaugas Grigalevičius	FBK Kaunas	18
3	(Croatia) Luka Aničić	Atlantas	17
3	(Lithuania) Ričardas Beniušis	FBK Kaunas	17
5	(Brazil) Rafael Gaúcho	FBK Kaunas	13
5	(Ukraine) Viktor Raskov	Šiauliai	13
5	(Brazil) Jose Negreiros	Sūduva	13
8	(Brazil) Willer Oliveira	Sūduva	12
8	(Lithuania) Valerijus Mižigurskis	Žalgiris	12
8	(Lithuania) Vitalijus Kavaliauskas	Ekranas	12

== See also ==
- 2007 LFF Lyga
