= Povilas Leimonas =

Lithuanian footballer

Personal information
- Full name: Povilas Leimonas
- Date of birth: 16 November 1987 (age 38)
- Place of birth: Marijampolė, Lithuania
- Height: 1.85 m (6 ft 1 in)
- Position: Defender

Team information
- Current team: Sveikata
- Number: 66

Youth career
- Sūduva

Senior career*
Years	Team	Apps	(Gls)
2005–2013	Sūduva	166	(8)
2013–2014	Widzew Łódź	17	(3)
2013–2014	Widzew Łódź II	5	(1)
2014	Jagiellonia Białystok	4	(0)
2014	Jagiellonia Białystok II	9	(0)
2015–2016	GKS Katowice	43	(3)
2016–2023	Sūduva	139	(9)
2023	Saned Joniškis	10	(0)
2023–	Sveikata		

International career
2007–2008	Lithuania U21	4	(0)
2011	Lithuania B	2	(0)
2011–2013	Lithuania	5	(0)
- * Club domestic league appearances and goals as of 20 November 2023

Povilas Leimonas (born 16 November 1987) is a Lithuanian professional footballer who plays as a defender for Sveikata.

== Club career ==
=== Early years ===
Leimonas has been with FK Sūduva since 2005, after graduating from the club's academy. He made his debut for the first team on 9 June 2006, in the 3-0 loss to FBK Kaunas, coming on as a substitute in the 79th minute. Povilas scored his first goal for the club on 10 August 2008 in a 4–0 victory over Silute. The defender also played in Europe for the first time in 2008, as FK Sūduva competed in the 2008 UEFA Cup first qualifying round against The New Saints of Wales. After Sūduva defeated TNS over two legs, Leimonas played in the 0–1 away win over Red Bull Salzburg on 28 August 2008.

=== 2009–2013 ===
Leimonas played a bigger role in 2009, scoring three times in the league. He again featured in the UEFA Europa League, playing against Danish side Randers twice, and scoring his team's goal in the 2nd leg 1–1 draw.

In 2010, Povilas played a bigger role still, featuring in 16 league matches and also playing in UEFA Europa League matches against Rapid Wien. He also played in three Baltic League fixtures, two of which were against Flora Tallinn. 2011 saw Leimonas score four times in eighteen league games and compete in UEFA Europa League again, against Swedish club Elfsborg.

In July 2012, Leimonas travelled to Poland to join top-flight side Widzew Łódź on trial. The defender featured in Widzew's 0–0 friendly draw with Cypriot outfit AEK Larnaca on 4 August; however, negotiations with the club broke down and Leimonas returned to Suduva - even appearing in their 2–2 draw at Žalgiris Vilnius as a late substitute the following day.

=== Widzew Łódź ===
On 30 August 2013, he signed with Widzew Łódź.

=== Jagiellonia Białystok ===
On 23 June 2014, he joined Jagiellonia Białystok.

== International career ==
=== Lithuania B ===
Povilas played for Lithuania's "B" team in two games in 2011, both against Lithuania U-21. The first game, played in Vilnius on 9 February, was won 2–1 by the "B" team, and the second match, in Marijampolė on 2 March, resulted in a 3–0 win.

=== Lithuania senior ===
Leimonas made his senior international debut on 7 June 2011, in a 0–1 friendly loss to Norway. He earned his second cap two months later in another friendly, a 3–0 win over Armenia on 10 August.

== Honours ==
Sūduva

- A Lyga: 2017, 2018, 2019
- Lithuanian Cup: 2006, 2008–09, 2019
- Lithuanian Supercup: 2009, 2018, 2019
