= Severino Lima =

Brazilian footballer

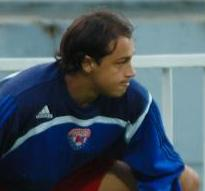

Personal information
- Full name: Severino Lima de Moura
- Date of birth: 17 May 1986 (age 40)
- Place of birth: Rio de Janeiro, Brazil
- Height: 1.79 m (5 ft 10 1/2 in)
- Position: Striker

Senior career*
Years	Team	Apps	(Gls)
2006	Flamengo		
2007	Vėtra	19	(4)
2007–2009	Illychivets Mariupol	47	(12)
2010	Ethnikos Piraeus	3	(0)
2010	Bogdanka Łęczna	1	(0)
2011–2012	Daugava Daugavpils	3	(0)
2012	Icasa	0	(0)
- * Club domestic league appearances and goals

Severino Lima de Moura (born 17 May 1986) is a Brazilian former professional footballer who played as a striker.

== Career ==
Severino played in Lithuania with FK Vetra. Severino joined Beta Ethniki side Ethnikos Piraeus in January 2010. In August 2011 Severino Lima de Moura joined Daugava Daugavpils, playing in the Latvian Higher League. He played 3 matches, scoring no goals in his first season there. He helped the team win the bronze medals of the championship.
