= Marián Dirnbach =

Slovak footballer

Personal information
- Full name: Marián Dirnbach
- Date of birth: 13 September 1979 (age 47)
- Place of birth: Trenčín, Czechoslovakia
- Height: 1.78 m (5 ft 10 in)
- Position: Centre forward

Youth career
- 1988–1995: Nové Mesto nad Váhom
- 1995–1996: Nitra

Senior career*
Years	Team	Apps	(Gls)
1996–1998	Nitra		
1999	Trenčín		
2001–2002	Ružomberok		
2002–2006	Žižkov	98	(79)
2005	→ Blšany (loan)	10	(5)
2005–2007	Inter Bratislava	65	(51)
2007–2008	Skonto Rīga		
2008	Nasaf Qarshi	12	(9)
2009	Prievidza		
2009–2011	Myjava		
2010	→ Moravany (loan)	9	(6)
2011–2013	Moravany	22	(14)

International career
- Slovakia U-18
- Slovakia U-19
- Slovakia U-20
- Slovakia U-21
1999	Slovakia	3	(0)
- * Club domestic league appearances and goals as of 5 September 2011

Marián Dirnbach (born 13 September 1979 in Bratislava) is a retired Slovak football striker. He played for a number of clubs, including Nitra, Trenčín, Ružomberok, and Inter Bratislava. Dirnbach was capped three times by the Slovakia national football team.

In a match-fixing case, the FIFA confirmed a 25-year-ban on 28 January 2014. Marián Dirnbach may not play professional football in any country worldwide for that period of time.
