= RSK Dižvanagi =

Latvian football club

Dižvanagi Rēzekne
- Full name: Rēzeknes sporta klubs Dižvanagi
- Founded: 1997
- Ground: Sporta Aģentūras Stadions; Rēzekne, Latvia
- Capacity: 2,500
- Chairman: (Latvia) Ivans Ribakovs
- League: 2. līga
- 2006: Virslīga, 8th
Home colours	Away colours

Dižvanagi Rēzekne was a Latvian football club, located in Rēzekne. They currently compete under the name of Dižvanagi-2 in the Latgales zona of the 2.līga as the reserve team of FK Blāzma Rēzekne.

== History ==
Dižvanagi were formed in 1997. They spent one season in the Virslīga in 2006, however they were relegated the 1. Liga. From the 2007 season they competed under the name of FK Blāzma Rēzekne. Dižvanagi Rēzekne became Dižvanagi-2 with the Blāzma Rēzekne reserve squad and from 2007 played in the Latgales zona of the 2.līga.
