= Arkadiusz Klimek =

Polish footballer

Personal information
- Date of birth: 25 March 1975 (age 51)
- Place of birth: Iława, Poland
- Height: 6 ft 2 in (1.88 m)
- Position: Striker

Youth career
- Unia Susz

Senior career*
Years	Team	Apps	(Gls)
1993–1995	Jeziorak Iława		
1995–1998	Stomil Olsztyn	66	(10)
1998–2003	Zagłębie Lubin	96	(23)
2003–2004	Panionios	21	(4)
2004–2005	Wisła Płock	12	(1)
2005–2007	FBK Kaunas	40	(16)
2007	→ Hearts (loan)	2	(0)
2008	Liepājas Metalurgs	10	(1)
2008–2010	Jeziorak Iława	32	(6)
2013–2014	GKS Wikielec		
- * Club domestic league appearances and goals

Arkadiusz Klimek (born 25 March 1975) is a Polish former professional footballer who played as a striker.

== Career ==
Klimek started his career with local side Jeziorak Iława before moving to Stomil Olsztyn in 1995 then Zagłębie Lubin three years later. After six seasons with Zagłębie, he decided to try his luck abroad, moving to Greece in 2003 with Panionios. He returned after a single season, joining Wisła Płock in 2004.

In 2005 Klimek left Poland for a second time, joining Lithuanian champions FBK Kaunas. He helped Kaunas win the Cup in his debut season, although they finished runners-up to Ekranas Panevėžys in the A Lyga. The following season his 8 league goals helped Kaunas regain the league title and also earned him a move to Scotland, where he joined Scottish Premier League club Heart of Midlothian on a 6-month loan deal in January 2007. He made his Hearts debut in a 1-0 defeat of Inverness Caledonian Thistle in March 2007 but made only one further start before his loan deal expired.

== Honours ==
FBK Kaunas

- A Lyga: 2006
- Lithuanian Cup: 2005
