= Pāvels Davidovs =

Latvian footballer (born 1980)

Personal information
- Full name: Pāvels Davidovs
- Date of birth: 30 December 1980 (age 45)
- Place of birth: Riga, Latvian SSR, Soviet Union (now Republic of Latvia)
- Height: 1.84 m (6 ft 0 in)
- Position: Goalkeeper

Youth career
- FK Avots

Senior career*
Years	Team	Apps	(Gls)
2000–2001	Ventspils	1	(0)
2002	Auda Riga	10	(0)
2003	Ekranas Panevėžys	1	(0)
2004	Dinaburg Daugavpils	1	(0)
2005–2007	Ventspils	17	(0)
2008	Daugava Daugavpils	12	(0)
2009	Dinaburg Daugavpils	11	(0)
2009–2011	Shakhtyor Soligorsk	7	(0)
2011	Mash'al Mubarek	12	(0)
2012	Jūrmala	14	(0)
2012–2013	Sūduva Marijampolė	42	(0)
2014–2015	Spartaks Jūrmala	26	(0)
2016	Smorgon	8	(0)
2016	BFC Daugavpils	4	(0)
- * Club domestic league appearances and goals as of 31 December 2016

Pāvels Davidovs (born 30 December 1980) is a Latvian former football goalkeeper.

== Club career ==
Davidovs played for FK Avots until 2000, when he started his professional career with FK Ventspils in the Latvian Higher League. He made only one appearance through the season, being a total backup keeper. In 2002, he left FK Ventspils, going to a one level lower league and joining FK Auda in Riga. He played 10 matches there and in 2003 had a spell in Lithuania with FK Ekranas. In 2004, he came back to Latvia, signing a contract with Latvian Higher League club Dinaburg FC in Daugavpils. Also this time he could not capitalize in the league and played only one match. In 2005, he returned to FK Ventspils and stayed there for 2 seasons, mostly being the second-choice goalkeeper, and making 17 appearances. In 2008, he joined Daugava Daugavpils. Davidovs played there for one season and played 12 matches, before joining another team from the same city – Dinaburg FC again. He made 11 good appearances and had an offer in Belarus from FC Shakhtyor Soligorsk, that he could not reject. He played there for 2 years. In the second season he mostly played in the reserve team. At the start of 2011 he decided to terminate his contract with the club, and in March, after becoming a free agent, he signed a contract with Mash'al Mubarek, playing in the Uzbek League. He left the Uzbek side at the start of 2012, returning to Latvia and joining the Latvian Higher League club FC Jūrmala. He took the first-choice keeper's spot right after joining. Playing 14 league matches at the club, he once again left – this time for the Lithuanian A Lyga club FK Sūduva Marijampolė. Davidovs was the first choice keeper of Sūduva for two seasons, participating in the domestic competitions and the UEFA Europa League. Prior to the 2014 Latvian Higher League season he moved to FK Spartaks Jūrmala. During the first half of the season he was the first-choice keeper, but during the second one mostly served as the back-up for Vitālijs Meļņičenko.

== Honours ==
- Champion of Latvia – 2006
