= Pavel Ryzhevski =

Belarusian footballer

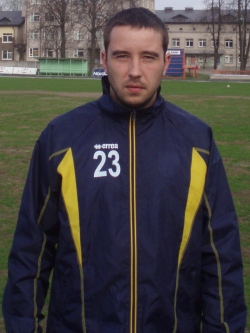
- Ryzhevski in Blāzma Rēzekne training

Personal information
- Date of birth: 3 March 1981 (age 45)
- Place of birth: Minsk, Belarusian SSR, Soviet Union
- Height: 1.83 m (6 ft 0 in)
- Position: Forward

Team information
- Current team: BFC Daugavpils

Youth career
- Smena Minsk

Senior career*
Years	Team	Apps	(Gls)
1999	Molodechno	3	(0)
2000	Policijas FK	20	(1)
2001	Skonto/Metāls	25	(13)
2002–2003	Skonto Rīga	21	(6)
2003–2007	Dinaburg Daugavpils	73	(17)
2005	→ Tobol Kostanay (loan)	6	(1)
2008	Dinamo Brest	5	(0)
2008–2010	Blāzma Rēzekne	65	(14)
2011	LDZ Cargo		
2012	Ilūkstes NSS	22	(26)
2013–	BFC Daugavpils	86	(29)
- * Club domestic league appearances and goals as of 31 December 2016

Pavel Ryzhevski (Russian: Павел Рыжевский, born 3 March 1981) is a Belarusian footballer, who currently plays for BFC Daugavpils in the Virsliga.

Ryzhevski previously played for Dinaburg FC. Through the 2008 season, Ryzhevski had made 125 appearances and scored 26 goals in the Latvian Higher League.

In the 2012 season Ryzhevski scored 26 goals in 22 matches for Ilūkstes NSS, helping the team clinch a promotion to the Latvian Higher League. He was the top scorer of the Latvian First League and was also named the best player of the Latvian First League in 2012 by the Latvian Football Federation. Despite his effectiveness, Ryzhevski left the club after the season due to professional reasons.

In April 2013 it was announced that Ryzhevski would continue playing in the Latvian First League, joining BFC Daugavpils.

== Honours ==
Skonto Riga

- Latvian Higher League champion: 2002, 2003
- Latvian Football Cup winner: 2002

== Playing career ==
?	FC Molodechno	2nd level of Belarus football	?/?*
2002	Skonto FC Rīga	Virsliga 1st level	12/3
2003	Skonto FC Rīga	Virsliga 1st level	9/3
	FC Tobol Kostanay	Kazakhstan Super League 1st level	?/?
2004	Dinaburg FC	LMT Virslīga 1st level	22/9
2005	Dinaburg FC	LMT Virslīga 1st level	10/1
2006	Dinaburg FC	LMT Virslīga 1st level	22/3
2007	Dinaburg FC	LMT Virslīga 1st level	?/?
2008	FC Dinamo Brest	Belarusian Premier League 1st level	5/0
2009	SK Blāzma	LMT Virslīga 1st level	28/4
2010	SK Blāzma	LMT Virslīga 1st level	26/8

* - played games and goals
