= Liivo Leetma =

Estonian footballer

Personal information
- Full name: Liivo Leetma
- Date of birth: 20 January 1977 (age 49)
- Place of birth: Kose, Estonia
- Height: 1.73 m (5 ft 8 in)
- Position: Midfielder

Senior career*
Years	Team	Apps	(Gls)
1995	JK Tervis Pärnu	17	(0)
1996	Lelle SK	8	(1)
1996–1997	FC Flora Tallinn	9	(1)
1997	JK Viljandi Tulevik	13	(0)
1998–2000	FC Levadia Tallinn	33	(7)
2001–2004	FC TVMK Tallinn	93	(10)
2005–2006	FC KooTeePee	27	(1)
2007	FC TVMK Tallinn	11	(1)
2007	JK Tallinna Kalev	13	(0)
2008–2009	JK Nõmme Kalju	40	(1)
2009	Paide Linnameeskond	11	(0)
2010–2011	Grankulla IFK	1	(0)
2014–2015	Paide Linnameeskond	51	(0)
Total		327	(22)

International career^{‡}
1998–2006	Estonia	36	(0)

Managerial career
- 2017–2020: Tallinna Kalev (assistant)
- 2020: Tallinna Kalev
- 2021: FC KooTeePee (assistant)
- * Club domestic league appearances and goals as of 30 November 2009 ‡ National team caps and goals as of 30 June 2007

Liivo Leetma (born 20 January 1977) is an Estonian football manager and former professional player. He played the position of midfielder. He won a total of 36 international caps for the Estonia national football team.

== Club career ==
Former clubs include JK Tervis Pärnu, Lelle SK, FC Flora Tallinn, JK Viljandi Tulevik, FC Levadia Tallinn, Paide JK, FC KooTeePee, FC TVMK Tallinn, JK Tallinna Kalev, JK Nõmme Kalju and Paide Linnameeskond.
