= Belye Berega, Bryansk Oblast =

Urban locality in Bryansk Oblast, Russia

Belye Berega Белые Берега
- Urban-type settlement
- Interactive map of Belye Berega
- Location of Belye Berega Belye Berega (Bryansk Oblast)
- Coordinates: 53°12′34″N 34°40′06″E
- Country: Russia
- Federal subject: Bryansk Oblast
- Elevation: 181 m (594 ft)

Population (2010 Census)
  - Total: 9,642
  - Estimate (2025): 7,146 (−25.9%)
- Time zone: UTC+3 (MSK)
- Postal code: 241902
- OKTMO ID: 15701000056

Belye Berega (Russian: Бе́лые Берега́) is an urban locality (urban-type settlement) under the administrative jurisdiction of the town of oblast significance of Bryansk of Bryansk Oblast, Russia. Population: 7,412 (2021 census); 9,642 (2010 census); 10,637 (2002 census); 10,759 (1989 Soviet census).
