= Aleksejs Višņakovs =

Latvian footballer

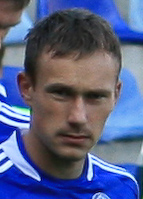

Personal information
- Full name: Aleksejs Višņakovs
- Date of birth: 3 February 1984 (age 42)
- Place of birth: Riga, Latvian SSR, Soviet Union (now Republic of Latvia)
- Height: 1.73 m (5 ft 8 in)
- Position: Midfielder

Youth career
- JFC Skonto

Senior career*
Years	Team	Apps	(Gls)
2001	Skonto Rīga	2	(0)
2002	FK Auda	20	(1)
2003–2008	Skonto Rīga	139	(32)
2009–2011	FK Ventspils	42	(14)
2011–2012	Cracovia	37	(4)
2012–2013	Baltika Kaliningrad	17	(2)
2013	Spartaks Jūrmala	4	(1)
2013–2014	Widzew Łódź	23	(1)
2014	Widzew Łódź II	3	(2)
2014	Zimbru Chișinău	12	(1)
2015–2016	Skonto Rīga	20	(3)
2016–2017	RFS	51	(4)
2018	Spartaks Jūrmala	27	(13)
2019	Riga	25	(4)
2020	Super Nova	5	(1)
Total		426	(83)

International career
2004–2018	Latvia	81	(9)
- * Club domestic league appearances and goals

Aleksejs Višņakovs (born 3 February 1984 in Riga) is a Latvian former professional footballer who played as a midfielder. He was also a member of Latvia national team.

== Club career ==
=== Latvia ===
As a youth player Višņakovs played for JFC Skonto. Being a promising youngster, in 2001 he was brought to the first team by that time manager Aleksandrs Starkovs. It was hard for the young player to fit in the squad, as he played only 2 matches in his first season with the club. After the season, he was given away to another club from Riga, this time FK Auda, playing in the Latvian First League. Višņakovs played 20 matches for them, scoring his first goal then. After showing some pretty good qualities, he was taken back to Skonto Riga and surely didn't disappoint this time. He had a long spell with the club that lasted for 5 years, from 2003 till 2008. During this time he became well known among the fans and was a vital player in the starting eleven, all in all making 139 appearances and scoring 31 goal. In 2009, he left the club, as his contract ended. Immediately after leaving, on 13 February 2009, he signed a contract with Skonto Riga rivals FK Ventspils. He played there for the next two seasons, also appearing in the UEFA Europa League group stages. All in all he played 43 matches, scoring 16 goals, becoming one of the league's top scorers.

=== Spartak Nalchik ===
After the successful season he was linked with a move to the Russian Premier League club Spartak Nalchik. In January 2011 he joined them on trial, and as it was successful, he signed a contract with them. Unfortunately, soon after the deal club's managers changed and as the new coach stated, Višņakovs was no more needed for the team, and Višņakovs was released.

=== Cracovia ===
Soon after leaving Nalchik Višņakovs went on trial with Cracovia, playing in the Polish Ekstraklasa. In February, 2011 he signed a two-and-a-half-year contract with them, soon after joining already proving his qualities. Joining in the middle of the season, he played 14 matches and scored 3 goals, helping the club secure a place in the next year's Ekstraklasa. But the next season, Cracovia were relegated from Ekstraklasa and Višņakovs terminated his contract by a mutual agreement.

=== Baltika Kaliningrad ===
In July 2012 Višņakovs was about to sign a contract with the Latvian Higher League club Spartaks Jūrmala, but eventually the move fell through and Aleksejs joined the Russian First Division club Baltika Kaliningrad on 11 August 2012, signing a one-year contract. He played 17 matches for Baltika, scoring 2 goals. In July 2013 his contract was terminated by mutual consent and Višņakovs joined Spartaks Jūrmala on a short-term contract.

=== Widzew Łódź ===
In August 2013 Višņakovs went on trial with the Polish Ekstraklasa club Widzew Łódź and signed a one-year contract with them on 23 August 2013, becoming a teammate of his younger brother Eduards. Višņakovs scored his first goal for Widzew in a 1-1 league draw against Jagiellonia Białystok on 31 August 2013.

=== Zimbru Chișinău ===
On 9 August 2014 Višņakovs signed a contract for one year with Moldovan club Zimbru Chișinău.

=== Return to Latvia ===
Before the 2015 season Višņakovs returned to his first club Skonto. In February 2016 he joined RFS, a newly promoted club in Latvian Higher League.

Višņakovs joined Riga FC for the 2019 season.

== International career ==
Višņakovs made his debut for Latvia in 2004 against Oman, but he didn't participate in the EURO 2004 group stages. As of 19 March 2015, he has had 57 caps and 8 goals for the national team.

=== International goals ===
Scores and results list Latvia's goal tally first.

No	Date	Venue	Opponent	Score	Result	Competition
1.	9 February 2005	Tsirion Stadium, Limassol, Cyprus	Austria	1–1	1–1 (5–3 pen.)	2005 Cyprus International Football Tournament
2.	12 November 2005	Vitebsky Central Sport Complex, Vitebsk, Belarus	Belarus	1–0	1–3	Friendly
3.	7 October 2006	Skonto Stadium, Riga, Latvia	Iceland	4–0	4–0	UEFA Euro 2008 qualification
4.	17 November 2007	Skonto Stadium, Riga, Latvia	Liechtenstein	4–1	4–1	UEFA Euro 2008 qualification
5.	28 March 2009	Stade Josy Barthel, Luxembourg City, Luxembourg	Luxembourg	3–0	4–0	2010 FIFA World Cup qualification
6.	7 October 2011	Skonto Stadium, Riga, Latvia	Malta	1–0	2–0	UEFA Euro 2012 qualification
7.	1 June 2012	Võru Spordikeskuse Staadion, Võru, Estonia	Lithuania	3–0	5–0	2012 Baltic Cup
8.	28 March 2015	Eden Arena, Prague, Czech Republic	Czech Republic	1–0	1–1	UEFA UEFA Euro 2016 qualifying
9.	29 March 2016	Victoria Stadium, Gibraltar	Gibraltar	4–0	5–0	Friendly

== Personal life ==
His younger brother Eduards is also a professional footballer, currently playing for SK Super Nova in the Latvian Optibet Virslīga as a forward. While Aleksejs was a part of FK Ventspils squad, they also played together. They are the second pair of brothers to play for Widzew together after Lithuanians Artūras and Igoris Steško during the 2001–2002 season.

== Honours ==
Skonto

- Virsliga: 2001, 2003, 2004
- Latvian Cup: 2001

Ventspils

- Baltic League: 2009–10

Riga

- Virsliga: 2019

Latvia

- Baltic Cup: 2008, 2012, 2014

Individual

- Latvian Young Player of the Year: 2004, 2005
