= Igors Sļesarčuks =

Latvian-Russian footballer and coach

Personal information
- Full name: Igors Sļesarčuks
- Date of birth: March 31, 1976 (age 50)
- Place of birth: Belye Berega, Bryansk Oblast, Soviet Union
- Height: 1.83 m (6 ft 0 in)
- Position: Forward

Youth career
- Skonto Riga

Senior career*
Years	Team	Apps	(Gls)
1994–1995	Skonto Riga	25	(11)
1995	→ Skonto/Metāls Riga	8	(5)
1995–1996	Sadam Tallinn	27	(4)
1997	Skonto Riga	1	(0)
1998–2001	Slavia Mozyr	84	(17)
2002–2004	Shakhtyor Soligorsk	61	(15)
2005	Venta	9	(6)
2005–2007	Ventspils	40	(21)
2008	Volgar-Gazprom Astrakhan	14	(2)
2008	Mashuk-KMV Pyatigorsk	17	(4)
2010–2011	Vitebsk	56	(15)
2012	Dnepr Mogilev	21	(12)
2013	Vitebsk	21	(4)
2014	Slavia Mozyr	22	(4)

International career
1998–2005	Latvia	5	(1)

Managerial career
- 2015–2018: Slavia Mozyr (assistant)
- 2019: Torpedo-BelAZ Zhodino (assistant)
- 2020: Osipovichi
- 2020: Minsk (assistant)
- 2021: Slonim-2017
- 2021–2022: Minsk (assistant)
- 2023: Dinamo Minsk (assistant)
- 2024–2025: Smorgon
- 2025: Vitebsk
- * Club domestic league appearances and goals

Igors Sļesarčuks (Russian: Игорь Анатольевич Слесарчук, born 31 March 1976) is a Latvian-Russian football coach and former player.

== Career ==
He has played for FC Mashuk-KMV Pyatigorsk in the Russian First Division, for Skonto Riga, FK Venta and FK Ventspils in Latvia and other clubs from Belarus, Russia and Estonia.

Despite living in Latvia and playing for Latvia national football team some time ago, he received a Russian passport in 2008 and received a Belarusian residence permit in 2012. As Latvia's double citizenship laws do not apply to Russian passport holders, it is unclear whether he holds Latvian citizenship.

== Personal life ==
Sļesarčuks was born in Belye Berega, Bryansk Oblast in the Russian SFSR to a Belarusian father and a Latvian mother of Russian descent. Later the family moved to Soviet-occupied Latvia.

== Playing career ==
1994	Skonto FC	Virsliga 1st level	19/10*
1995	Skonto FC	Virsliga 1st level	6/1
	Skonto-Metāls Rīga	Virsliga 1st level	8/5
	Tallinna Sadam	Meistriliiga 1st level	9/1
1996	Tallinna Sadam	Meistriliiga 1st level	18/3
1997	Skonto FC	Virsliga 1st level	1/0
1998	FC Slavia Mozyr	Belarusian Premier League 1st level	27/3
1999	FC Slavia Mozyr	Belarusian Premier League 1st level	22/4
2000	FC Slavia Mozyr	Belarusian Premier League 1st level	19/7
2001	FC Slavia Mozyr	Belarusian Premier League 1st level	16/3
2002	Shakhtyor Soligorsk	Belarusian Premier League 1st level	11/3
2003	Shakhtyor Soligorsk	Belarusian Premier League 1st level	26/7
2004	Shakhtyor Soligorsk	Belarusian Premier League 1st level	24/5
2005	FK Venta	Virsliga 1st level	9/6
	FK Ventspils	Virsliga 1st level	13/12
2006	FK Ventspils	Virsliga 1st level	24/9
2007	FK Ventspils	Virsliga 1st level	3/0

* - played games and goals

== Honours ==
- Champion of Latvia (2):

- 1994, 2006

- Virsliga Top Scorer (1):

- 2005
