= Vladimirs Bespalovs =

Latvian professional footballer

Personal information
- Full name: Vladimirs Bespalovs
- Date of birth: 22 June 1988 (age 38)
- Place of birth: Ventspils, Latvia, USSR (now Republic of Latvia)
- Height: 1.89 m (6 ft 2 1/2 in)
- Positions: Defender; right-back; centre-back

Youth career
- 1996–2005: OC Ventspils

Senior career*
| Years | Team | Apps | (Gls) |
| 2005–2008 | FK Ventspils-2 | 31 | (3) |
| 2006–2012 | FK Ventspils | 28 | (3) |

International career^{‡}
| 2008 | Latvia U-19 | 2 | (0) |
| 2010 | Latvia U-21 | 1 | (0) |
| 2010 | Latvia | 1 | (0) |
- * Club domestic league appearances and goals as of 27 March 2013 ‡ National team caps and goals as of 27 March 2013

Vladimirs Bespalovs (born 22 June 1988 in Ventspils) is a Latvian professional footballer, who last played for FK Ventspils in the Latvian Higher League.

Bespalovs has represented his country at the U-21 level and has played one match in the full international level. He was firstly called up to the national team for a friendly match against China on 17 November 2010.
