= Artūras Steško =

Lithuanian footballer

Personal information
- Full name: Artūras Steško
- Date of birth: 25 March 1976 (age 50)
- Place of birth: Trakai, Soviet Union
- Height: 1.85 m (6 ft 1 in)
- Position: Midfielder

Senior career*
Years	Team	Apps	(Gls)
1996–1997	Žalgiris-Volmeta Vilnius	13	(1)
1996–1999	Žalgiris	64	(18)
1999–2000	Widzew Łódź	12	(1)
2000	Žalgiris	9	(8)
2000–2001	TSV Havelse	18	(1)
2001–2002	Widzew Łódź	4	(0)
2002–2004	Žalgiris	33	(5)
2004–2005	Vėtra	27	(0)
2006–2008	Žalgiris	35	(2)
Total		215	(36)

International career
1995–1997	Lithuania	5	(0)
- * Club domestic league appearances and goals

Artūras Steško (born 25 March 1976) is a Lithuanian former professional footballer who played as a midfielder. His twin brother Igoris was also a footballer.

Steško previously played for Widzew Łódź in the Polish Ekstraklasa.

He made five appearances for the Lithuania national team.
