= Igoris Steško =

Lithuanian footballer

Personal information
- Full name: Igoris Steško
- Date of birth: 25 March 1976 (age 50)
- Place of birth: Trakai, Soviet Union
- Height: 1.84 m (6 ft 1/2 in)
- Position: Midfielder

Senior career*
Years	Team	Apps	(Gls)
1996–1999	Žalgiris	66	(18)
1999–2000	Widzew Łódź	3	(0)
2000	Žalgiris	13	(6)
2000–2001	TSV Havelse	18	(0)
2001–2002	Widzew Łódź	5	(0)
2002–2004	Žalgiris	39	(3)
2004–2005	Vėtra	38	(1)
2006–2010	Žalgiris		
2011–2012	Trakai		

International career
1997–1998	Lithuania	6	(0)
- * Club domestic league appearances and goals

Igoris Steško (born 25 March 1976) is a Lithuanian former professional footballer who played as a midfielder. His twin brother Artūras was also a footballer.

Steško previously played for Widzew Łódź in the Polish Ekstraklasa.

Steško has made six appearances for the Lithuania national team.
