= 2006 Latvian Higher League =

Latvian football league season for the highest division

Latvian Higher League
- Season: 2006
- Champions: FK Ventspils
- Relegated: RSK Dizvanagi
- UEFA Champions League: FK Ventspils
- UEFA Cup: FK Liepajas Metalurgs; Skonto FC
- UEFA Intertoto Cup: Dinaburg FC
- Top goalscorer: (Latvia) Mihails Miholaps (15 goals)

Final tables of the 2006 Latvian Higher League Championship.

== League standings ==
Pos	Team	Pld	W	D	L	GF	GA	GD	Pts	Qualification or relegation
1	Ventspils (C)	28	19	5	4	48	23	+25	62	Qualification for Champions League first qualifying round
2	Liepājas Metalurgs	28	18	6	4	66	20	+46	60	Qualification for UEFA Cup first qualifying round
3	Skonto	28	16	6	6	55	21	+34	54	Qualification for UEFA Cup first qualifying round
4	Dinaburg	28	12	5	11	33	38	−5	41	Qualification for Intertoto Cup first round
5	Ditton	28	10	8	10	33	31	+2	38	
6	Jūrmala	28	11	4	13	36	36	0	37	
7	Rīga (O)	28	6	4	18	21	57	−36	22	Qualification for relegation play-offs
8	Dižvanagi (R)	28	0	2	26	11	77	−66	2	Relegation to Latvian First League

Source: RSSSF
(C) Champions; (O) Play-off winners; (R) Relegated

== Match table ==
First half of the season
Home \ Away	DIN	DIT	DIŽ	JŪR	MET	RĪG	SKO	VEN
Dinaburg		1–3	2–1	1–1	0–2	1–0	0–2	2–1
Ditton	1–1		1–0	2–1	2–0	3–1	1–1	0–1
Dižvanagi	1–3	0–3		0–1	0–0	0–0	0–2	0–3
Jūrmala	1–0	0–1	2–1		1–1	3–0	0–1	1–1
Liepājas Metalurgs	1–1	0–0	6–1	3–2		5–0	2–1	0–1
Rīga	0–0	0–0	1–0	2–1	0–4		1–4	0–1
Skonto	2–0	0–0	6–0	2–0	0–0	5–1		1–1
Ventspils	3–2	2–1	7–1	1–0	1–1	1–0	1–0	

Source: RSSSF
Legend: Blue = home team win; Yellow = draw; Red = away team win.

Second half of the season
Home \ Away	DIN	DIT	DIŽ	JŪR	MET	RĪG	SKO	VEN
Dinaburg		1–0	2–0	0–1	1–2	2–0	0–6	3–3
Ditton	2–4		2–1	0–0	1–2	0–1	0–2	0–1
Dižvanagi	0–2	0–1		1–3	0–2	2–5	0–1	1–3
Jūrmala	0–1	6–1	3–0		1–0	2–1	1–2	1–2
Liepājas Metalurgs	2–0	2–1	6–0	7–1		3–1	3–1	4–0
Rīga	0–1	0–4	3–1	2–0	0–5		1–2	0–2
Skonto	0–2	2–2	6–0	3–1	2–1	1–1		0–1
Ventspils	3–0	1–1	1–0	0–2	1–2	4–0	1–0	

Source: RSSSF
Legend: Blue = home team win; Yellow = draw; Red = away team win.

== Relegation play-offs ==
The matches were played on 9 and 12 November 2006.

Team 1	Agg.	Team 2	1st leg	2nd leg
Rīga	5–0	Valmiera	3–0	2–0

Source: RSSSF

== Top scorers ==
Rank	Player	Club	Goals
1	Mihails Miholaps (LAT)	Skonto FC	15
2	Ģirts Karlsons (LAT)	FK Liepājas Metalurgs	14
3	Darius Miceika (LTU)	FK Liepājas Metalurgs	13
4	* Jurģis Kalns (LAT)	Jūrmala	12
5	Kristaps Grebis (LAT)	FK Liepājas Metalurgs	11

Source: RSSSF

== Awards ==
Best	Name	Team
Goalkeeper	Andris Vaņins (LAT)	FK Ventspils
Defender	Jean-Paul Ndeki (CMR)	FK Ventspils
Midfielder	Vitālijs Astafjevs (LAT)	Skonto FC
Forward	Ģirts Karlsons (LAT)	FK Liepājas Metalurgs
Young Player	Aleksandrs Cauņa (LAT)	Skonto FC
