= Alfredas Skroblas =

Lithuanian footballer

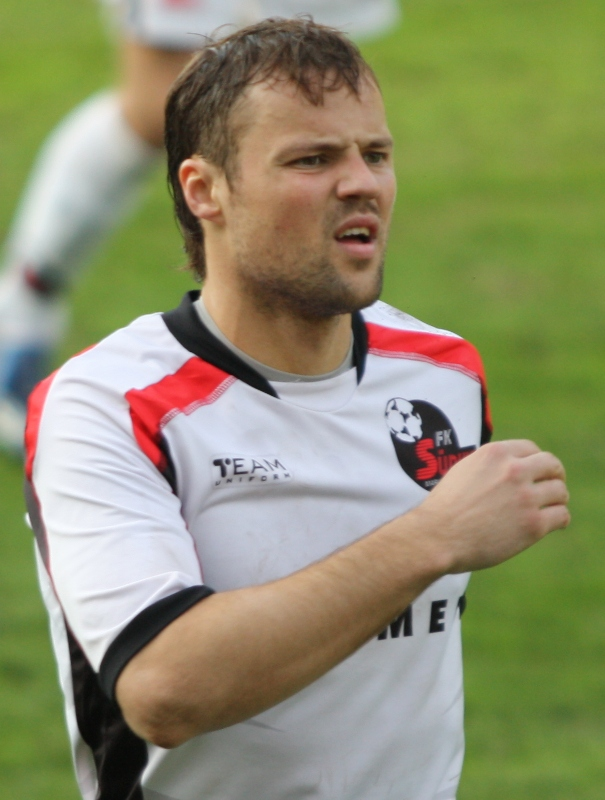

Personal information
- Date of birth: 11 March 1984 (age 42)
- Place of birth: Marijampolė, Lithuanian SSR, Soviet Union
- Height: 1.82 m (6 ft 0 in)
- Position: Defender

Team information
- Current team: UMF Snaefell
- Number: 16

Senior career*
Years	Team	Apps	(Gls)
2002–2008	Ekranas	177	(2)
2009–2011	Sūduva		
2012–2015	Kruoja		
2016–2017	Šilas	17	(3)
2018	Stál-úlfur		
2018	Þróttur Vogum		
2019–	UMF Snaefell		

International career
2008	Lithuania	2	(0)
- * Club domestic league appearances and goals as of 18 December 2009

Alfredas Skroblas (born 11 March 1984) is a Lithuanian professional football player who plays as a defender for UMF Snaefell in Iceland. As of 10 March 2017, he was serving a 12-month ban imposed by the Lithuanian Football Federation for match-fixing.
