= Giedrius Tomkevičius =

Lithuanian footballer

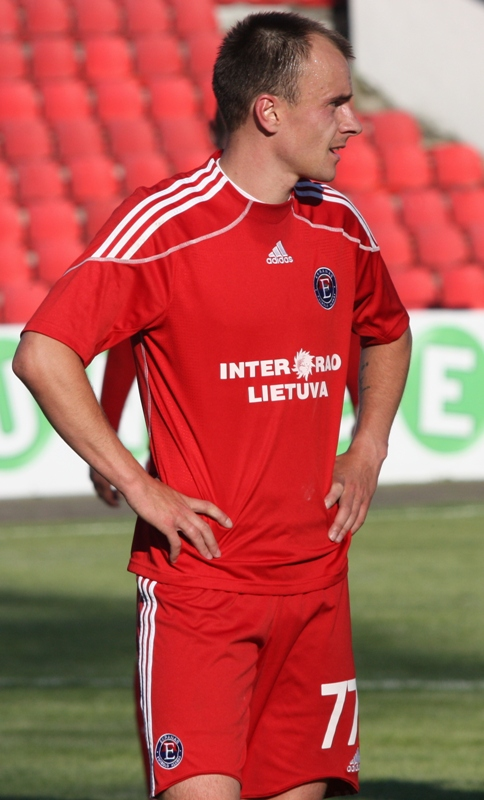

Personal information
- Full name: Giedrius Tomkevičius
- Date of birth: 29 February 1984 (age 42)
- Place of birth: Lithuanian SSR, Soviet Union (now Republic of Lithuania)
- Height: 1.81 m (5 ft 11 1/2 in)
- Position: Midfielder

Team information
- Current team: Bjørnevatn IL
- Number: 4

Senior career*
Years	Team	Apps	(Gls)
2001–2013	FK Ekranas	299	(14)
2014	FK Daugava Rīga	34	(3)
2015–	Bjørnevatn IL	2	(0)

International career^{‡}
2008–	Lithuania	1	(0)
- * Club domestic league appearances and goals as of 28 December 2014 ‡ National team caps and goals as of 28 December 2014

Giedrius Tomkevičius (born 29 February 1984) is a Lithuanian football midfielder currently playing for Bjørnevatn IL in Norsk Tipping Ligaen avd. 2 in Norway.

Tomkevičius made one appearance for the Lithuania national football team during 2008.
