= Andrius Šidlauskas (footballer) =

Lithuanian footballer

Personal information
- Date of birth: 30 October 1984 (age 42)
- Height: 1.75 m (5 ft 9 in)
- Position: Midfielder

Senior career*
Years	Team	Apps	(Gls)
2001–2006	Šiauliai	114	(13)
2007–2008	Ekranas Panevėžys	46	(1)
2009	Granit Mikashevichi	1	(0)
2009–2012	Ekranas Panevėžys	29	(2)
2013	Kruoja Pakruojis	6	(0)
2013–2015	Juventa-99 Šiauliai		
- * Club domestic league appearances and goals

Andrius Šidlauskas (born 30 October 1984) is a former Lithuanian professional footballer.
