= Rafael Gaúcho =

Brazilian footballer

Rafael Gaúcho Ledesma
Personal information
- Full name: Rafael Pompeo Rodrigues Ledesma
- Date of birth: December 31, 1982 (age 43)
- Place of birth: Porto Alegre, Brazil
- Height: 1.80 m (5 ft 11 in)
- Position: Attacking midfielder

Senior career*
Years	Team	Apps	(Gls)
2003–2004	Juventude	38	(6)
2004	→ Flamengo (loan)	2	(1)
2004–2005	Académica	16	(2)
2005–2006	Estrela da Amadora	4	(0)
2006	Atlético Mineiro	2	(0)
2006–2008	FBK Kaunas	46	(35)
2009–2011	Partizan Minsk	30	(4)
2011	→ Dinamo Minsk (loan)	24	(6)
2012–2013	Sūduva Marijampolė	33	(21)
2013–2014	Ethnikos Achna	10	(3)
2014–2015	Birkirkara	27	(13)
2015–2016	Sliema Wanderers	19	(3)
2016	→ Valletta (loan)	10	(1)
2016	Gżira United	13	(1)
2017	Jelgava	12	(2)
2017–2018	Vitebsk	26	(7)
2018	San Ġwann	4	(1)
2019	Panevėžys	28	(6)
2020–2021	Oratory Youths		
- * Club domestic league appearances and goals as of 2 December 2019

Rafael Pompeo Rodrigues Ledesma (born 31 December 1982), more commonly known as Gaúcho or Rafael Ledesma, is a Brazilian former footballer.

He was signed by FBK Kaunas from Atlético Mineiro in summer 2006. After two seasons in FBK Kaunas he moved to Partizan Minsk in Belarus. In winter 2012 he moved back to Lithuania and played for Suduva. In 2013 Ledesma left Lithuania and signed with Ethnikos Achna in Cyprus.

In January 2019 he returned to Lithuania and became a member of FK Panevėžys. In 2019 he played 28 matches in A Lyga and scored 6 goals. After one season he left FK Panevėžys.

== Honours ==
- Lithuanian Championship champion (2):
  - 2006, 2007,
- Lithuanian Championship Runners-up (2):
  - 2008,
- Lithuanian Cup winner (2)
  - 2007–08
- Baltic League: Winner (1)
  - 2008
- Maltese Premier League: champion (1)
  - 2015–16
- Maltese FA Trophy: winner (1)
  - 2014–15
- Maltese Super Cup: winner (1)
  - 2014

Individual

- Best player of Lithuanian Championship 2007.
- Top scorer in A Lyga: 2008 14 goals
- Sūduva Marijampolė Player of the Year 2012
