= Gatis Kalniņš =

Latvian footballer

Personal information
- Full name: Gatis Kalniņš
- Date of birth: 12 August 1981 (age 45)
- Place of birth: Valmiera, Latvian SSR, Soviet Union (now Republic of Latvia)
- Height: 1.93 m (6 ft 4 in)
- Position: Striker

Team information
- Current team: FK Valmiera
- Number: 19

Youth career
- FK Valmiera

Senior career*
| Years | Team | Apps | (Gls) |
| 2000–2002 | FK Valmiera | 4 | (0) |
| 2002–2008 | Skonto Rīga | 141 | (58) |
| 2009 | FK Auda | 2 | (0) |
| 2009 | FK Jūrmala-VV | 8 | (3) |
| 2009–2010 | Othellos Athienou | 6 | (0) |
| 2010–2011 | FK Jūrmala-VV | 39 | (10) |
| 2011–2012 | FK Jelgava | 11 | (1) |
| 2012–2017 | FS METTA/Latvijas Universitāte | 101 | (17) |
| 2018– | FK Valmiera | | |

International career^{‡}
| 2004–2007 | Latvia | 19 | (1) |
- * Club domestic league appearances and goals as of 6 October 2013 ‡ National team caps and goals as of 6 October 2013

Gatis Kalniņš (born 12 August 1981) is a Latvian football striker, currently playing for FK Valmiera in the Latvian Higher League.

== Club career ==
As a youth player Gatis Kalniņš played for his local club FK Valmiera, being taken to the first team in 2000. He played there for 2 years, playing 29 matches and scoring 10 goals. In 2002, he was signed by Skonto Riga. He played there until 2008 - played 141 matches and scored 58 league goals over 7 seasons. In July 2008 he went on trial with the Championship side Burnley, but didn't stay with the team. In 2008 Kalniņš was released from Skonto and he signed a contract with Jūrmala-VV for the upcoming season. After scoring 3 goals in the first 8 matches he decided to leave and went abroad, signing a contract in Cyprus with Othellos Athienou from the Cypriot Second Division. He managed to play only six matches there, scoring no goals due to his long-term injuries. He was released after the season. In 2010, he came back to Latvia, signing for Jūrmala-VV once again. He played there for the next two seasons. Scoring 10 goals in 39 league games he became the team's top scorer for the both of them. In March 2011 Kalniņš went on trial with the Finnish team Inter Turku, but didn't sign a contract then. In July 2011 he moved to FK Jelgava, as the team from Jūrmala was financially struggling. In his first season with Jelgava, Kalniņš scored 1 goal in 11 league matches. Before the start of the 2012 season Gatis joined the Latvian Higher League newcomers FS METTA/Latvijas Universitāte. On 17 November 2013 Kalniņš scored a hat-trick in the promotion/relegation play-offs and helped his team retain a place in the Latvian Higher League, with a 5–2 victory over FB Gulbene on aggregate. After the 2013 season he was named FS METTA/Latvijas Universitāte player of the season.

== International career ==
Kalniņš has had 19 appearances for the Latvia national football team and he has scored 1 goal. He made his debut in February 2004 in a friendly match against Hungary. He scored his first and since then only international goal in 2005 against Oman.

== Honours ==
=== Skonto Riga ===
- Latvian champion
  - 2002, 2003, 2004
- Latvian Cup winner
  - 2002
