= Egidijus Varnas =

Lithuanian footballer

Personal information
- Date of birth: 31 July 1975 (age 51)
- Height: 1.82 m (5 ft 11 1/2 in)
- Position: Forward

Team information
- Current team: FK Ekranas
- Number: 19

Senior career*
Years	Team	Apps	(Gls)
1995–1996	FK Utenis Utena	?	(?)
1996–2003	FK Ekranas	128	(46)
2003–2004	Hapoel Kfar Saba F.C.	?	(12)
2004–2005	Hakoah Ramat Gan	?	(?)
2005–2006	FK Šiauliai	15	(6)
2006–present	FK Ekranas	141	(44)

International career^{‡}
2001	Lithuania	2	(0)
- * Club domestic league appearances and goals as of 17 December 2009 ‡ National team caps and goals as of 6 October 2009

Egidijus Varnas (born 31 July 1975) is a Lithuanian football forward currently playing for FK Ekranas.

Varnas made two appearances for the Lithuania national football team during 2001.
