= Genādijs Soloņicins =

Latvian footballer

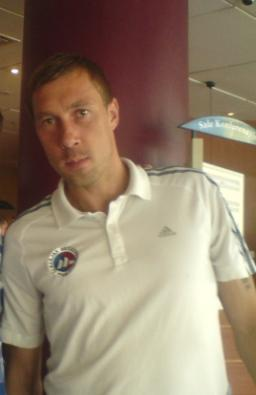
- Soloņicins with FK Liepājas Metalurgs

Personal information
- Full name: Genādijs Soloņicins
- Date of birth: 3 January 1980 (age 46)
- Place of birth: Liepāja, Latvian SSR, Soviet Union (now Republic of Latvia)
- Height: 1.81 m (5 ft 11 1/2 in)
- Position: Midfielder

Youth career
- Liepājas Metalurgs

Senior career*
Years	Team	Apps	(Gls)
1997–2009	Liepājas Metalurgs	258	(40)
2009–2010	Simurq Zaqatala	18	(1)
2010	Liepājas Metalurgs	10	(0)
2011–2013	Liepājas Metalurgs	80	(15)

International career^{‡}
2000–2010	Latvia	44	(1)
- * Club domestic league appearances and goals as of 4 January 2015 ‡ National team caps and goals as of 4 January 2015

Genādijs Soloņicins (born 3 January 1980 in Liepāja) is a retired Latvian football midfielder. His last professional club was Liepājas Metalurgs in the Latvian Higher League, the club where he spent most of his professional career. Soloņicins was also a member of Latvia national football team.

== Club career ==
Soloņicins played for Liepājas Metalurgs for 12 years, making his debut in 1997. In the penultimate match of the 2004 Virslīga season he missed a crucial last minute penalty in a 3–2 loss to Skonto FC meaning the club lost out to Skonto on becoming Latvian champions. However, the following season, Soloņicins was part of the Liepājas Metalurgs team that finally broke Skonto's 14-year reign in Latvian football when they became Virslīga champions in October 2005. In December, he was named the Virslīgas best Midfielder of the 2005 season. In summer 2009 he joined Simurq Zaqatala playing in the Azerbaijan Premier League. While playing in Azerbaijan he became a substantial first eleven figure and helped the club start the 2009–2010 season unexpectedly well but the end of the season was not as good and Simurq finished the regular championship in the 7th position. At the time teams in Azerbaijan were divided into 2 pools after the end of the regular season with 6 teams in each pool. As Simurq finished 7th, they competed in the second pool with the last 6 teams of the regular season. Due to the relatively poor results Simurq broke off contracts with its foreign players and Soloņicins was forced to leave the club in February 2010.

Following the release, Soloņicins signed a contract with Liepājas Metalurgs in March 2010, returning to the team, where he had played before for nearly 13 years. At the end of 2010 he terminated his contract with Metalurgs to look for a club abroad, but having struggled with receiving satisfactory offers from other clubs returned to Metalurgs in February 2011, after being out of football for half a year. After the 2013 season Metalurgs football club was dissolved due to the financial struggle of its sole sponsor Liepājas Metalurgs, the metalwork company and replaced in the league by the newly formed FK Liepāja. In January 2014 Soloņicins announced his retirement from professional football.

== International career ==
Soloņicins made 44 appearances for Latvia and scored 1 goal, playing for the national team from 2000 to 2010.

== Honours ==
- Virslīga champion (2): 2005, 2009
- Virslīga runner-up (8): 1998, 1999, 2003, 2004, 2006, 2007, 2008, 2011
- Latvian Cup winner (1): 2006
- Baltic League champion (1): 2007
