= Mindaugas Grigalevičius =

Lithuanian footballer (born 1981)

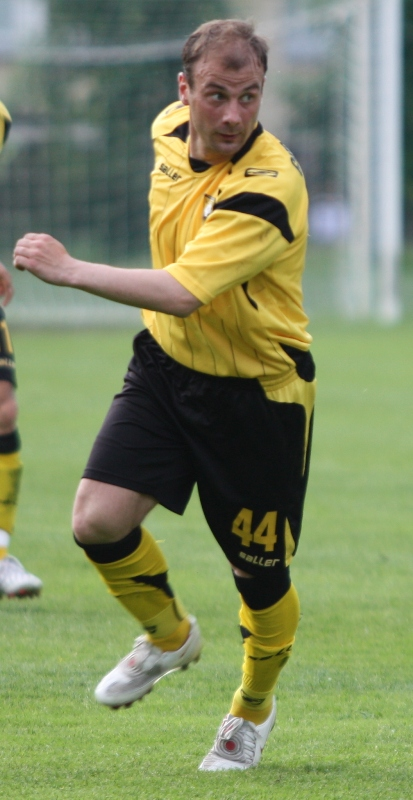

Personal information
- Date of birth: 3 December 1981 (age 44)
- Place of birth: Vilkaviškis, Soviet Union
- Height: 1.76 m (5 ft 9 1/2 in)
- Position: Striker

Team information
- Current team: Frøya
- Number: 11

Senior career*
Years	Team	Apps	(Gls)
1999	Ardena Vilnius	14	(0)
2000	Polonija Vilnius	25	(3)
2000–2003	Žalgiris Vilnius	51	(12)
2004	VB Vagur	16	(4)
2005–2006	FK Šilutė	46	(18)
2007–2008	FBK Kaunas	43	(30)
2009–2010	FK Vetra	18	(9)
2010	Mika Yerevan	9	(2)
2010–2011	Tauras Tauragė	26	(5)
2012	REO Vilnius	17	(3)
2012–	Frøya	7	(2)

International career^{‡}
2003–2008	Lithuania	2	(0)
- * Club domestic league appearances and goals as of 12 November 2012 ‡ National team caps and goals as of 14 September 2009

Mindaugas Grigalevičius (born 3 December 1981) is a Lithuanian footballer player for Frøya.

Grigalevičius has made two appearances for the Lithuania national football team.
