= Baltic League =

Football club tournament held between the top clubs from Baltic states

- Founded: 2007
- Folded: 2011
- Country: Estonia; Latvia; Lithuania
- Number of clubs: 12 (2007–2008); 16 (2009–2011)
- Last champions: (Latvia) Skonto (2010–11)
- Most championships: (Latvia) Metalurgs (Lithuania) Kaunas (Latvia) Ventspils (Latvia) Skonto (1 title)
- Broadcaster(s): Viasat Sport Baltic

The Baltic League (officially known as the Triobet Baltic League) was a Baltic men's football club tournament held four times between the top club sides from Estonia, Latvia and Lithuania. Launched in 2007 inspired by the now defunct Scandinavian tournament Royal League and by the Baltic Basketball League.

== History ==
The first two tournaments were held between top four club sides from each country. For 2009–10 the competition was expanded to 16 teams, with five sides from every Baltic state taking part. One additional slot was allocated to the sixth best team from the country of the previous winner.

A similar competition was the Baltic Champions Cup which featured the league champions of Estonia, Latvia and Lithuania.

The inaugural tournament in 2007 finished as a two legged final. This format was abandoned for the second tournament and subsequent finals were played as a single match at the home of one of the finalists. After this format was introduced, the team hosting the match did not win despite the added home advantage.

The first two tournaments were played from Spring to Summer with 12 entrants but this changed to a longer Winter to Summer tournament with four more clubs taking part.

== Finals ==
| Season | Winner | Score | Runner-up | Venue(s) | Referee |
|---|---|---|---|---|---|
| 2007 | (Latvia) Metalurgs | 8 – 2 (aggregate); 3 – 1, 5 – 1 | (Latvia) Ventspils | Ventspils Olimpiskais Stadions, Ventspils; Daugava Stadium, Liepāja | (Estonia) Kristo Tohver (Lithuania) Audrius Žuta |
| 2008 | (Lithuania) Kaunas | 2 – 1 | (Latvia) Skonto | Skonto Stadions, Riga | (Estonia) Hannes Kaasik |
| 2009–10 | (Latvia) Ventspils | 3 – 3 (a.e.t.); 5 – 3 (pen.) | (Lithuania) Sūduva | Sūduva Stadium, Marijampolė | (Estonia) Sten Kaldma |
| 2010–11 | (Latvia) Skonto | 1 – 1 (a.e.t.); 5 – 4 (pen.) | (Latvia) Ventspils | Ventspils Olimpiskais Stadions, Ventspils | (Lithuania) Nerijus Dunauskas |

== Statistics ==
=== Performances by club ===
| Club | 1st | 2nd | Seasons | Seasons Won |
|---|---|---|---|---|
| (Latvia) Ventspils | 1 | 2 | 4 | 2009–10 |
| (Latvia) Skonto | 1 | 1 | 4 | 2010–11 |
| (Latvia) Metalurgs | 1 | 0 | 4 | 2007 |
| (Lithuania) Kaunas | 1 | 0 | 2 | 2008 |
| (Lithuania) Sūduva | 0 | 1 | 3 | |
| (Lithuania) Ekranas | 0 | 0 | 4 | |
| (Estonia) Flora | 0 | 0 | 4 | |
| (Estonia) Levadia | 0 | 0 | 4 | |
| (Estonia) Trans | 0 | 0 | 4 | |
| (Latvia) Dinaburg | 0 | 0 | 2 | |
| (Lithuania) Žalgiris | 0 | 0 | 2 | |
| (Estonia) TVMK | 0 | 0 | 2 | |
| (Lithuania) Vėtra | 0 | 0 | 2 | |
| (Lithuania) Banga | 0 | 0 | 2 | |
| (Latvia) Jūrmala | 0 | 0 | 2 | |
| (Estonia) Kalju | 0 | 0 | 2 | |
| (Estonia) Sillamäe Kalev | 0 | 0 | 2 | |
| (Lithuania) Šiauliai | 0 | 0 | 2 | |
| (Lithuania) Tauras | 0 | 0 | 2 | |
| (Latvia) Rīga | 0 | 0 | 1 | |
| (Latvia) Olimps | 0 | 0 | 1 | |
| (Latvia) Blāzma | 0 | 0 | 1 | |

=== By country ===
| Country | 1st | 2nd | Seasons Won |
|---|---|---|---|
| Latvia | 3 | 3 | 2007, 2009–10, 2010–11 |
| Lithuania | 1 | 1 | 2008 |
| Estonia | 0 | 0 | |

=== All-time top goalscorers ===
| # | Player | Goals |
|---|---|---|
| 1 | (Latvia) Aleksandrs Cauņa | 10 |
| 1 | (Latvia) Ģirts Karlsons | 10 |
| 3 | (Lithuania) Ričardas Beniušis | 8 |
| 4 | (Brazil) Rafael Gaúcho | 7 |
| 5 | (Latvia) Genādijs Soloņicins | 6 |
| 5 | (Lithuania) Egidijus Varnas | 6 |
| 7 | (Lithuania) Mindaugas Kalonas | 5 |
| 7 | (Latvia) Mihails Miholaps | 5 |
| 7 | (Latvia) Andrejs Perepļotkins | 5 |
| 10 | (Latvia) Viktors Dobrecovs | 4 |
| 10 | (Estonia) Aleksandr Dubõkin | 4 |
| 10 | (Georgia (country)) Vladimir Dvalishvili | 4 |
| 10 | (Latvia) Oļegs Laizāns | 4 |
| 10 | (Latvia) Vīts Rimkus | 4 |
| 10 | (Ukraine) Serhij Sernecki | 4 |
| 10 | (Estonia) Vjatšeslav Zahovaiko | 4 |
| 10 | (Latvia) Aleksejs Višņakovs | 4 |
