= Serhiy Sernetskyi =

Ukrainian footballer

Personal information
- Full name: Serhiy Mykolayovych Sernetskyi
- Date of birth: 30 August 1981 (age 45)
- Place of birth: Ternopil, Soviet Union
- Height: 1.85 m (6 ft 1 in)
- Position: Striker

Team information
- Current team: FK Ventspils
- Number: 18

Youth career
- FC Nyva Ternopil

Senior career*
Years	Team	Apps	(Gls)
1998	Haray Zhovkva	3	(0)
1999–2001	CSKA / Arsenal Kyiv	1	(0)
1999–2001	→ CSKA-2 / CSKA Kyiv	51	(6)
2002	Sokil Berezhany	6	(5)
2002–2003	Nyva Ternopil	38	(30)
2004–2006	Stal Alchevsk	54	(22)
2007	FK Ventspils	13	(5)
- * Club domestic league appearances and goals

Serhiy Mykolayovych Sernetskyi (Ukrainian: Сергій Миколайович Сернецький; born 30 August 1981) is a former football striker from Ukraine.

Due to problems with health, he early retired in 2007.

== Playing career ==
Season	Club (Country)	League (level)	GP	Min	GS
1998–99	FC Haray Zhovkva	Ukrainian Second League 3rd level	3	151	0
1998–99	FC CSKA-2 Kyiv	Ukrainian First League 2nd level	10	218	0
1999–00	FC CSKA-2 Kyiv	Ukrainian First League 2nd level	14	412	3
2000–01	FC CSKA-2 Kyiv	Ukrainian First League 2nd level	14	935	2
2000–01	FC CSKA Kyiv	Ukrainian Premier League 1st level	1	1	0
2001–02	FC CSKA-2 Kyiv	Ukrainian First League 2nd level	13	900	1
2001–02	FC CSKA Kyiv	Ukrainian Premier League 1st level	0	0	0
2002	FC Sokil Berezhany	Amateur competitions	6	528	5
2002–03	FC Nyva Ternopil	Ukrainian Second League 3rd level	25	?	21
2003–04	FC Nyva Ternopil	Ukrainian Second League 3rd level	13	?	9
2003–04	FC Stal Alchevsk	Ukrainian First League 2nd level	15	?	7
2004–05	FC Stal Alchevsk	Ukrainian Premier League 1st level	30	?	11
2005–06	FC Stal Alchevsk	Ukrainian Premier League 1st level	23	?	3
2005-06	FC Stal Reserves	Reserve Premier League 1st level	2	180	0
2006–07	FC Stal Alchevsk	Ukrainian Premier League 1st level	6	?	1
2006-07	FC Stal Reserves	Reserve Premier League 1st level	4	273	1
2007	FK Ventspils	Latvian Higher League 1st level	9	?	3

League	GP	Min	GS
Ukrainian Premier League	60	?	15
Latvian Higher League	9	?	3
Ukrainian First League	66	?	13
Ukrainian Second League	41	?	30
Amateurs (Ukraine)	6	528	5

== Facts ==
In March 2007 FC Baltika Kaliningrad also interested about Serhij Sernecki, but he joined FK Ventspils

== Honours ==
Ventspils

- Virslīga: 2007
- Latvian Cup: 2007,
