= Hannes Kaasik =

Estonian football referee

Hannes Kaasik (born 11 August 1978) is an Estonian football referee. He has refereed UEFA Champions League and UEFA Europa League matches since the 2009–10 season. His first competitive international was the 2010 FIFA World Cup qualification match between San Marino and Czech Republic in August 2008.
