= 2009 FK Ventspils season =

Ventspils
2009 season
- Manager: Roman Hryhorchuk (until 11 August); Nunzio Zavettieri (from 11 August)
- Stadium: Ventspils Olimpiskais Stadions
- Latvian Higher League: 2nd
- 2009–10 Latvian Football Cup: Progressed to 2010 season
- 2009–10 Baltic League: Progressed to 2010 season
- 2009–10 UEFA Champions League: Play-off round
- 2009–10 UEFA Europa League: Group stage

The 2009 season was Futbola Klubs Ventspils's 12th year in existence as a football club. In addition to the Latvian Higher League, Ventspils participated in this season's editions of the Latvian Football Cup, the Baltic League, the UEFA Champions League and the UEFA Europa League.

== Squad ==
Note: Flags indicate national team as defined under FIFA eligibility rules; some limited exceptions apply. Players may hold more than one non-FIFA nationality.

No.	Pos.	Nation	Player
1	GK	LAT	Māris Eltermanis
2	DF	LAT	Aleksejs Soleičuks
3	MF	LAT	Visvaldis Ignatāns
4	MF	LAT	Jurijs Žigajevs
5	MF	LAT	Jevgēņijs Kosmačovs
6	MF	LAT	Artis Lazdiņš
7	DF	SRB	Saša Cilinšek
8	DF	LAT	Deniss Kačanovs
9	FW	LAT	Vīts Rimkus
11	MF	LAT	Aleksejs Višņakovs
12	DF	LAT	Igors Savčenkovs
14	FW	RUS	Ivan Shpakov

No.	Pos.	Nation	Player
15	MF	RUS	Grigori Chirkin
17	DF	CMR	Jean-Paul Ndeki
19	MF	RUS	Aleksandr Mysikov
20	FW	MDA	Alexandru Dedu
22	MF	MDA	Igor Țîgîrlaș
23	DF	LAT	Vladimirs Bespalovs
25	FW	LAT	Ritvars Rugins
30	GK	LAT	Andrejs Pavlovs
32	FW	LAT	Andrejs Butriks
—	GK	LAT	Sergejs Digulevs
—	DF	SUI	Ronny Hodel

== Competitions ==
=== Overview ===
Competition	First match	Last match	Starting round	Final position	Record							
Competition	First match	Last match	Starting round	Final position	Pld	W	D	L	GF	GA	GD	Win %
Latvian Higher League	15 March 2009	8 November 2009	Matchday 1	2nd	32	23	5	4	89	21	+68	71.88
2009–10 Latvian Football Cup	N/A	N/A	Third round	Progressed	0	0	0	0	0	0	+0	—
2009–10 Baltic League	8 October 2009	10 November 2009	Round of 16	Progressed	2	1	1	0	2	1	+1	50.00
2009–10 UEFA Champions League	15 July 2009	25 August 2009	Second qualifying round	Play-off round	6	3	0	3	9	8	+1	50.00
2009–10 UEFA Europa League	17 September 2009	16 December 2009	Group stage	Group stage	6	0	3	3	3	10	−7	0.00
Total					46	27	9	10	103	40	+63	58.70

Source: Competitions

=== Latvian Higher League ===
==== League table ====
Pos	Team	Pld	W	D	L	GF	GA	GD	Pts	Qualification or relegation
1	Liepājas Metalurgs (C)	32	25	4	3	96	23	+73	79	Qualification for Champions League second qualifying round
2	Ventspils	32	23	5	4	89	21	+68	74	Qualification for Europa League second qualifying round
3	Skonto	32	23	4	5	98	30	+68	73	Qualification for Europa League first qualifying round
4	Jūrmala-VV	32	12	4	16	42	60	−18	40	
5	Olimps/RFS	32	11	5	16	53	60	−7	38	

Source: Latvian Football Federation (in Latvian)
Rules for classification: 1st points; 2nd head-to-head points; 3rd head-to-head goal difference; 4th overall wins; 5th goal difference; 6th goals scored.
(C) Champions

==== Results summary ====
Overall								Home						Away					
Pld	W	D	L	GF	GA	GD	Pts	W	D	L	GF	GA	GD	W	D	L	GF	GA	GD
32	23	5	4	89	21	+68	74	11	3	2	48	14	+34	12	2	2	41	7	+34

Source: Competitions

==== Matches ====
15 March 2009 1	Daugava Rīga	1–5	Ventspils	Riga
14:00 EET (UTC+2)	K. Gomaa 64'	Report	Menteshashvili 10'; Chirkin 32'; Žigajevs 75'; Butriks 90'; Rugins 90'	Stadium: Olimpiskais Sporta Centrs; Referee: Andrejs Sipailo

21 March 2009 2	Ventspils	1–0	Olimps/RFS	Ventspils
16:00 EET (UTC+2)	Rimkus 31'	Report		Stadium: Ventspils Olimpiskais Stadions; Referee: Aleksandrs Golubevs

5 April 2009 3	Ventspils	5–1	Blāzma Rēzekne	Ventspils
16:30 EEST (UTC+3)	Chirkin 16', 50'; Rimkus 72' (pen.); A. Višņakovs 74'; A. Mysikov 81'	Report	J. Jukss 1'	Stadium: Ventspils Olimpiskais Stadions; Referee: Andris Treimanis

8 April 2009 4	Ventspils	1–1	Tranzīts Ventspils	Ventspils
17:00 EEST (UTC+3)	Rimkus 64'	Report	V. Mukins 66'	Stadium: Ventspils Olimpiskais Stadions; Referee: Sergejs Braga

12 April 2009 5	Jūrmala-VV	0–3	Ventspils	Jūrmala
18:00 EEST (UTC+3)		Report	Țîgîrlaș 14'; Chirkin 31', 55'	Stadium: Sloka Stadium; Referee: Aleksandrs Anufrijevs

18 April 2009 6	Ventspils	0–0	Dinaburg	Ventspils
18:00 EEST (UTC+3)		Report		Stadium: Ventspils Olimpiskais Stadions; Referee: Aleksandrs Anufrijevs

26 April 2009 7	Skonto	1–3	Ventspils	Riga
17:00 EEST (UTC+3)	Semjonovs 17'	Report	Menteshashvili 12'; Žigajevs 82'; Rimkus 87' (pen.)	Stadium: Skonto Stadium; Referee: Andrejs Sipailo

30 April 2009 8	Ventspils	1–1	Liepājas Metalurgs	Ventspils
18:00 EEST (UTC+3)	Kosmačovs 90'	Report	Surņins 89'	Stadium: Ventspils Olimpiskais Stadions; Referee: Vadims Direktorenko

10 May 2009 9	Ventspils	4–2	Daugava Rīga	Ventspils
18:00 EEST (UTC+3)	Țîgîrlaș 20'; Rimkus 47'; Chirkin 49'; A. Mysikov 68'	Report	D. Tarasovs 77'; K. Priedēns 84'	Stadium: Ventspils Olimpiskais Stadions; Referee: Aleksandrs Golubevs

13 May 2009 10	Olimps/RFS	1–5	Ventspils	Riga
18:00 EEST (UTC+3)	Astafjevs 60'	Report	Žigajevs 5', 56'; Rimkus 35' (pen.), 66'; A. Višņakovs 77'	Stadium: Skonto Stadium; Referee: Andrejs Sipailo

28 May 2009 11	Blāzma Rēzekne	0–3	Ventspils	Rēzekne
18:00 EEST (UTC+3)		Report	Butriks 72'; Rimkus 76'; Dedov 85'	Stadium: Sporta Aģentūras Stadions; Referee: Aleksandrs Golubevs

31 May 2009 12	Tranzīts Ventspils	0–3	Ventspils	Ventspils
18:00 EEST (UTC+3)		Report	Țîgîrlaș 37', 79'; Butriks 49' (pen.)	Stadium: Ventspils Olimpiskais Stadions; Referee: Aleksejs Spasjoņņikovs

11 June 2009 13	Ventspils	3–0	Jūrmala-VV	Ventspils
18:00 EEST (UTC+3)	Kačanovs 33'; A. Višņakovs 74'; Dedov 90'	Report		Stadium: Ventspils Olimpiskais Stadions; Referee: Vadims Čerņikovs

14 June 2009 14	Dinaburg	1–0	Ventspils	Daugavpils
15:00 EEST (UTC+3)	V. Afanasjevs 24'	Report		Stadium: Daugava Stadium; Referee: Aleksejs Spasjoņņikovs

18 June 2009 15	Ventspils	2–1	Skonto	Ventspils
19:45 EEST (UTC+3)	Țîgîrlaș 48'; Rimkus 64'	Report	Lukjanovs 53'	Stadium: Ventspils Olimpiskais Stadions; Referee: Vadims Direktorenko

22 June 2009 16	Liepājas Metalurgs	2–1	Ventspils	Liepāja
19:40 EEST (UTC+3)	Rafaļskis 52'; Karlsons 54'	Report	Chirkin 69'	Stadium: Daugava Stadium; Referee: Aleksandrs Anufrijevs

30 June 2009 17	Daugava Rīga	0–5	Ventspils	Riga
18:00 EEST (UTC+3)		Report	Rimkus 17', 58', 86'; A. Višņakovs 81'; V. Ponakovs 90' (o.g.)	Stadium: Latvijas Universitātes stadions Referee: Aleksandrs Golubevs

4 July 2009 18	Ventspils	5–3	Olimps/RFS	Ventspils
18:00 EEST (UTC+3)	Țîgîrlaș 57', 86'; A. Višņakovs 59'; Chirkin 75'; Rimkus 90+3' (pen.)	Report	Karašausks 14'; A. Siņicins 47'; I. Sputajs 52'	Stadium: Ventspils Olimpiskais Stadions; Referee: Vadims Direktorenko

8 July 2009 19	Ventspils	5–0	Blāzma Rēzekne	Ventspils
17:30 EEST (UTC+3)	Žigajevs 45', 88'; Shpakov 47'; Rimkus 63' (pen.); Dedov 84'	Report		Stadium: Ventspils Olimpiskais Stadions; Referee: Andris Treimanis

8 August 2009 20	Ventspils	7–0	Tranzīts Ventspils	Ventspils
18:00 EEST (UTC+3)	Shpakov 14' (pen.); A. Višņakovs 24', 60'; Martins 33'; Rimkus 55', 80'; Chirkin 75'	Report		Stadium: Ventspils Olimpiskais Stadions; Referee: Andrejs Sipailo

15 August 2009 21	Jūrmala-VV	0–4	Ventspils	Jūrmala
18:00 EEST (UTC+3)		Report	Shpakov 38'; Žigajevs 86'; Rimkus 90', 90'	Stadium: Sloka Stadium; Referee: Aleksandrs Golubevs

30 August 2009 22	Ventspils	1–2	Liepājas Metalurgs	Ventspils
17:00 EEST (UTC+3)	Žigajevs 55'	Report	Grebis 9'; I. Kirhners 22'	Stadium: Ventspils Olimpiskais Stadions; Referee: Andrejs Sipailo

13 September 2009 23	Ventspils	1–0	Dinaburg	Ventspils
16:00 EEST (UTC+3)	Shpakov 55'	Report		Stadium: Ventspils Olimpiskais Stadions; Referee: Vadims Direktorenko

20 September 2009 24	Olimps/RFS	0–2	Ventspils	Riga
17:00 EEST (UTC+3)		Report	E. Višņakovs 54', 74'	Stadium: Latvijas Universitātes stadions Referee: Andrejs Sipailo

23 September 2009 25	Tranzīts Ventspils	0–1	Ventspils	Ventspils
17:00 EEST (UTC+3)		Report	Shpakov 69'	Stadium: Ventspils Olimpiskais Stadions; Referee: Aleksejs Spasjoņņikovs

26 September 2009 26	Blāzma Rēzekne	0–2	Ventspils	Rēzekne
16:00 EEST (UTC+3)		Report	Žigajevs 14'; Butriks 26' (pen.)	Stadium: Sporta Aģentūras Stadions; Referee: Vadims Direktorenko

4 October 2009 27	Skonto	0–0	Ventspils	Riga
14:00 EEST (UTC+3)		Report		Stadium: Skonto Stadium; Referee: Vadims Direktorenko

15 October 2009 28	Ventspils	8–0	Daugava Rīga	Ventspils
14:00 EEST (UTC+3)	E. Višņakovs 9'; Martins 12', 83'; Rugins 25'; A. Mysikov 52'; A. Višņakovs 63'; Shpakov 72', 90'	Report		Stadium: Ventspils Olimpiskais Stadions; Referee: Andris Treimanis

18 October 2009 29	Ventspils	4–1	Jūrmala-VV	Ventspils
14:00 EEST (UTC+3)	Gauračs 24'; A. Višņakovs 54'; E. Višņakovs 55'; Iheruome 75'	Report	Bezzubovs 30'	Stadium: Ventspils Olimpiskais Stadions; Referee: Vadims Čerņikovs

26 October 2009 30	Ventspils	0–2	Skonto	Ventspils
14:00 EET (UTC+2)		Report	Cauņa 31'; Koļesņičenko 84'	Stadium: Ventspils Olimpiskais Stadions; Referee: Aleksandrs Anufrijevs

1 November 2009 31	Liepājas Metalurgs	1–1	Ventspils	Liepāja
14:00 EET (UTC+2)	Grebis 78' (pen.)	Report	Butriks 17'	Stadium: Daugava Stadium; Referee: Andrejs Sipailo

8 November 2009 32	Dinaburg	0–3	Ventspils	Daugavpils
14:00 EET (UTC+2)		Report		Stadium: Daugava Stadium

=== Latvian Football Cup ===
Third round took place during the 2010 season.

=== Baltic League ===
==== Round of 16 ====
8 October 2009 First leg	Banga (Lithuania)	0–0	(Latvia) Ventspils	Klaipėda, Lithuania
15:00 EEST (UTC+3)		Report		Stadium: Miesto stadions

10 November 2009 Second leg	Ventspils (Latvia)	2–1 (2–1 agg.)	(Lithuania) Banga	Ventspils, Latvia
14:00 EET (UTC+2)		Report		Stadium: Ventspils Olimpiskais Stadions
Note: Ventspils won 2–1 on aggregate.

Quarter-finals took place during the 2010 season.

=== UEFA Champions League ===
==== Second qualifying round ====
15 July 2009 First leg	Ventspils (Latvia)	3–0	(Luxembourg) F91 Dudelange	Ventspils, Latvia
18:00 EEST (UTC+3)	Țîgîrlaș (yellow card) 17'; Butriks 79'; Kačanovs 86'; Rimkus 87'	Report	Ronny (yellow card) 30'; Walter (yellow card) 82'; Zeghdane (yellow card) 85'	Stadium: Ventspils Olimpiskais Stadions; Attendance: 2,630; Referee: Marcin Borski (Poland)

22 July 2009 Second leg	F91 Dudelange (Luxembourg)	1–3 (1–6 agg.)	(Latvia) Ventspils	Dudelange, Luxembourg
18:00 CEST (UTC+2)	Dav. da Mota 15'; L. Guthleber (yellow card) 26'; Françoise (yellow card) 62' (yellow-red card) 69'	Report	Astafjevs 27', (yellow card) 69'; Butriks 57'; Mihadjuks 67', (yellow card) 84'	Stadium: Stade Jos Nosbaum; Attendance: 1,165; Referee: Martin Ingvarsson (Sweden)
Note: Ventspils won 6–1 on aggregate.

==== Third qualifying round ====
29 July 2009 First leg	Ventspils (Latvia)	1–0	(Belarus) BATE Borisov	Ventspils, Latvia
18:00 EEST (UTC+3)	Kačanovs (yellow card) 15'; Kosmačovs (yellow card) 42'; Chirkin 64'	Report	Rodionov (yellow card) 42'; Bordachyov (yellow card) 89'; Radzkow (yellow card) 90+2'	Stadium: Ventspils Olimpiskais Stadions; Attendance: 2,950; Referee: Darko Čeferin (Slovenia)

5 August 2009 Second leg	BATE Borisov (Belarus)	2–1 (2–2 (a) agg.)	(Latvia) Ventspils	Borisov, Belarus
18:00 EEST (UTC+3)	Krivets 43', 57'; Stasevich (yellow card) 82'	Report	Țîgîrlaș 14'; Rimkus (yellow card) 30'; Chirkin (yellow card) 35' (yellow-red card) 90+5'; Cilinšek (yellow card) 60'; Rugins (yellow card) 68'	Stadium: Haradski Stadium; Attendance: 5,336; Referee: Alexandru Tudor (Romania)
Note: 2–2 on aggregate. Ventspils won on away goals.

==== Play-off round ====
19 August 2009 First leg	Ventspils (Latvia)	0–3	(Switzerland) Zürich	Riga, Latvia (Note: The match was played at the Skonto Stadium in Riga, instead of Ventspils regular stadium, the Ventspils Olimpiskais Stadions in Ventspils, which did not meet UEFA requirements.)
21:45 EEST (UTC+3)	Astafjevs (yellow card) 26'; Cilinšek (yellow card) 90+2'	Report	Vonlanthen 12'; Aegerter 55'; Djuric 75'	Stadium: Skonto Stadium; Attendance: 7,300; Referee: Tom Henning Øvrebø (Norway)

25 August 2009 Second leg	Zürich (Switzerland)	2–1 (5–1 agg.)	(Latvia) Ventspils	St. Gallen, Switzerland (Note: Played in St. Gallen at AFG Arena as Zürich's Letzigrund hosted IAAF Golden League's fourth part (Weltklasse Zürich) on 28 August 2009.)
20:45 CEST (UTC+2)	Vonlanthen 6'; Abdi 90+2'	Report	Țîgîrlaș 8'; Baymatov (yellow card) 51'	Stadium: AFG Arena; Attendance: 9,050; Referee: Terje Hauge (Norway)
Note: Zürich won 5–1 on aggregate.

=== UEFA Europa League ===
==== Group stage ====
Pos	Team	Pld	W	D	L	GF	GA	GD	Pts	Qualification	SCP	HER	HVN	VEN
1	(Portugal) Sporting CP	6	3	2	1	8	6	+2	11	Advance to knockout phase	—	1–0	1–1	1–1
2	(Germany) Hertha BSC	6	3	1	2	6	5	+1	10	Advance to knockout phase	1–0	—	0–1	1–1
3	(Netherlands) Heerenveen	6	2	2	2	11	7	+4	8		2–3	2–3	—	5–0
4	(Latvia) Ventspils	6	0	3	3	3	10	−7	3		1–2	0–1	0–0	—

Source: Soccerway

17 September 2009 1	Hertha BSC (Germany)	1–1	(Latvia) Ventspils	Berlin, Germany
19:00 CEST (UTC+2)	Piszczek 34'; Bengtsson (yellow card) 45+3'; Stein (yellow card) 83'	Report	Žigajevs (yellow card) 41'; Gauračs 48'	Stadium: Olympic Stadium; Attendance: 13,454; Referee: Alan Kelly (Republic of Ireland)

1 October 2009 2	Ventspils (Latvia)	0–0	(Netherlands) Heerenveen	Riga, Latvia
22:05 EEST (UTC+3)		Report	Dingsdag (yellow card) 90+3'	Stadium: Skonto Stadium; Attendance: 3,500; Referee: Oleh Oriekhov (Ukraine)

22 October 2009 3	Ventspils (Latvia)	1–2	(Portugal) Sporting CP	Riga, Latvia
22:05 EEST (UTC+3)	Laizāns 64' (pen.)	Report	Veloso 6'; Moutinho 85'; Angulo (yellow card) 88'; Liédson (yellow card) 90'	Stadium: Skonto Stadium; Attendance: 4,500; Referee: Sascha Kever (Switzerland)

5 November 2009 4	Sporting CP (Portugal)	1–1	(Latvia) Ventspils	Lisbon, Portugal
18:00 WET (UTC)	Marques (yellow card) 14'; Saleiro 22'; Fernández (yellow card) 60'; Silva (yellow card) 81'	Report	Zamperini 15'; Žigajevs (yellow card) 45'	Stadium: Estádio José Alvalade; Attendance: 18,103; Referee: Aleksandar Stavrev (Macedonia)

3 December 2009 5	Ventspils (Latvia)	0–1	(Germany) Hertha BSC	Riga, Latvia
22:05 EET (UTC+2)	Laizāns (yellow card) 35'; Țîgîrlaș (yellow card) 72'; Zamperini (yellow card) 81'; Gauračs (yellow card) 83'	Report	Raffael 12', (yellow card) 73' (yellow-red card) 87'	Stadium: Skonto Stadium; Attendance: 7,200; Referee: István Vad (Hungary)

16 December 2009 6	Heerenveen (Netherlands)	5–0	(Latvia) Ventspils	Heerenveen, Netherlands
19:00 CET (UTC+1)	Papadopulos (yellow card) 41'; Väyrynen 55'; Elm 58'; Sibon 77', 78'; Janmaat 88'	Report	Rugins (yellow card) 30'; Chirkin (yellow card) 40'	Stadium: Abe Lenstra Stadion; Attendance: 16,000; Referee: Robert Schörgenhofer (Austria)
