= List of Latvian football transfers winter 2009–10 =

This is a list of Latvian football transfers in the 2009–10 winter transfer window by club. Only transfers of the Latvian Higher League are included.

All transfers mentioned are shown in the external links at the bottom of the page. If you want to insert a transfer that isn't shown there, please add a reference.

== Latvian Higher League ==
=== SK Liepājas Metalurgs ===
In: Note: Flags indicate national team as defined under FIFA eligibility rules; some limited exceptions apply. Players may hold more than one non-FIFA nationality.

No.	Pos.	Nation	Player
—	DF	LAT	Artjoms Kuzņecovs (from Dinaburg FC)
—	FW	LAT	Jurģis Kalns (from FK Jūrmala)
—	MF	LAT	Genādijs Soloņicins (from (Azerbaijan) FK Simurq Zaqatala)
—	MF	BRA	Wellington Santos da Silva (from (Portugal) C.D. Nacional)
—	FW	LTU	Vitalijus Kavaliauskas (from (Belarus) FC Granit Mikashevichi)
—	FW	MNE	Ilija Spasojević (from (Serbia) Borac Čačak)
—	MF	LAT	Kristiāns Božis (from FK Liepājas Metalurgs-2)
—	MF	LAT	Roberts Savaļnieks (from FK Liepājas Metalurgs-2)
—	FW	LAT	Dāvis Ikaunieks (from FK Liepājas Metalurgs-2)

Out: Note: Flags indicate national team as defined under FIFA eligibility rules; some limited exceptions apply. Players may hold more than one non-FIFA nationality.

No.	Pos.	Nation	Player
—	MF	MDA	Andrei Cojoccari (to (Moldova) CSCA-Rapid Chişinău)
—	FW	AUT	Daniel Kastner (to (Iceland) Grindavík)
—	GK	LAT	Pāvels Naglis (to (Lithuania) FK Šiauliai)
—	GK	LAT	Maksims Vitkovskijs (to (Lithuania) FK Mažeikiai)
—	MF	LAT	Romāns Gladīļins (to (Lithuania) FK Mažeikiai)
—	DF	LAT	Toms Mežs (loan to FB Gulbene-2005)
—	FW	LAT	Raivo Kalniņš (loan to FB Gulbene-2005)
—	MF	LAT	Nils Sitenkovs (loan to FB Gulbene-2005)

=== FK Ventspils ===
In: Note: Flags indicate national team as defined under FIFA eligibility rules; some limited exceptions apply. Players may hold more than one non-FIFA nationality.

No.	Pos.	Nation	Player
—	DF	LAT	Ritus Krjauklis (from Dinaburg FC)
—	DF	BLR	Dzmitry Verhawtsow (from (Belarus) FC Naftan Novopolotsk)
—	FW	NGR	Jojo Ogunnupe (loan return from FK Tranzīts Ventspils)
—	DF	LAT	Artūrs Silagailis (from (Ukraine) FC Kryvbas Kryvyi Rih)
—	DF	LAT	Oļegs Baikovs (from (Cyprus) Aspis Pylas)
—	DF	LAT	Vladislavs Gabovs (from Dinaburg FC)
—	GK	BLR	Pavel Chasnowski (unattached)
—	GK	LAT	Aleksandrs Vlasovs (from Skonto FC)
—	GK	LAT	Valentīns Raļkevičs (from FC Tranzīts)
—	MF	LAT	Artūrs Zjuzins (from FC Tranzīts)
—	MF	LAT	Visvaldis Ignatāns (from FC Tranzīts)
—	MF	LAT	Deniss Tarasovs (from Daugava Riga)
—	FW	NGR	Michael Tukura (from (Israel) Maccabi Nazareth)
—	FW	RUS	Sergey Shumilin (from (Russia) PFC CSKA Moscow)
—	DF	RUS	Evgeny Postnikov (from (Russia) FC Torpedo-ZIL Moscow (2003))
—	FW	RUS	Alexey Kuchuk (from (Russia) Kuban Krasnodar)
—	DF	RUS	Vladislav Kryuchkov (from (Russia) FC Istra)

Out: Note: Flags indicate national team as defined under FIFA eligibility rules; some limited exceptions apply. Players may hold more than one non-FIFA nationality.

No.	Pos.	Nation	Player
—	MF	LAT	Artis Lazdiņš (to FK Jelgava)
—	MF	RUS	Aleksandr Mysikov (to (Kyrgyzstan) Dordoi-Dynamo Naryn)
—	FW	POR	Joao Martins (to (Angola) 1º de Agosto)
—	DF	LAT	Pāvels Mihadjuks (to (Scotland) Dundee United)
—	MF	LAT	Vitālijs Astafjevs (to Skonto FC)
—	FW	LAT	Edgars Gauračs (on loan to (Romania) FC Rapid Bucharest)
—	DF	ARG	Ivan Nadal (on loan to (Argentina) Defensores de Belgrano)
—	FW	ARG	Rubén Botta (on loan to (Argentina) Club Atlético Tigre)
—	DF	LAT	Nauris Bulvītis (on loan to (Scotland) Inverness Caledonian Thistle F.C.)
—	DF	KGZ	Azamat Baimatov (to (Kyrgyzstan) Dordoi-Dynamo Naryn)
—	DF	SUI	Ronny Hodel (to (Switzerland) SC Cham)
—	MF	MDA	Igor Tigirlas (to (Ukraine) FC Metalurh Zaporizhya)
—	FW	LAT	Andrejs Butriks (on loan to (Romania) FC Ceahlăul Piatra Neamţ)
—	MF	CRO	Tomislav Živko (to (Croatia) Inter Zaprešić)
—	GK	LAT	Māris Eltermanis (to FC Daugava)
—	DF	LAT	Māris Smirnovs (to FC Tranzīts)
—	FW	LAT	Vīts Rimkus (to (Lithuania) FK Ekranas)
—	DF	LAT	Deniss Kačanovs (released)
—	MF	LAT	Juris Laizāns (to Skonto FC)
—	DF	ITA	Alessandro Zamperini (to (Italy) Ravenna Calcio)
—	DF	BLR	Dzmitry Verhawtsow (to (Belarus) FC Naftan Novopolotsk)
—	DF	LAT	Aleksejs Soleičuks (to FC Tranzīts)
—	GK	BLR	Pavel Chasnowski (to FC Tranzīts)
—	MF	LAT	Aleksandrs Baturinskis (to FC Tranzīts)
—	FW	NGR	Jojo Ogunnupe (to FC Tranzīts)
—	FW	NGR	Uche Iheruome (released)
—	DF	CMR	Jean Paul Ndeki (to (Cyprus) AEP Paphos)

=== Skonto FC ===
In: Note: Flags indicate national team as defined under FIFA eligibility rules; some limited exceptions apply. Players may hold more than one non-FIFA nationality.

No.	Pos.	Nation	Player
—	DF	LAT	Kirils Ševeļovs (from Daugava Riga)
—	GK	LAT	Kaspars Ikstens (from RFS/Olimps)
—	DF	LAT	Renārs Rode (from RFS/Olimps)
—	FW	LAT	Armands Pētersons (from RFS/Olimps)
—	FW	LAT	Artūrs Karašausks (from RFS/Olimps)
—	FW	LAT	Alans Siņeļņikovs (from RFS/Olimps)
—	FW	LAT	Daniils Turkovs (from RFS/Olimps)
—	MF	LAT	Vitālijs Astafjevs (from FK Ventspils)
—	DF	LAT	Vitālijs Maksimenko (from FK Daugava Riga)
—	MF	LAT	Igors Tarasovs (from RFS/Olimps)
—	MF	LAT	Juris Laizāns (from FK Ventspils)

Out: Note: Flags indicate national team as defined under FIFA eligibility rules; some limited exceptions apply. Players may hold more than one non-FIFA nationality.

No.	Pos.	Nation	Player
—	DF	GEO	David Gamezardashvili (to (Georgia (country)) FC Zestafoni)
—	MF	RUS	Andrei Agafonov (released)
—	MF	LAT	Vladimirs Koļesņičenko (to (Ukraine) FC Chornomorets)
—	MF	LAT	Igors Semjonovs (to FK Jūrmala)
—	MF	LAT	Oļegs Laizāns (to (Poland) Lechia Gdańsk)
—	DF	LAT	Raivis Hščanovičs (to (Canada) Toronto FC)
—	GK	LAT	Aleksandrs Vlasovs (to FK Ventspils)
—	MF	LAT	Igors Kozlovs (on loan to (Lithuania) FK Šiauliai)
—	DF	LAT	Sergejs Golubevs (to FK Jūrmala)
—	GK	LAT	Vitālijs Artjomenko (to RFS/Olimps)

=== FK Jūrmala-VV ===
In: Note: Flags indicate national team as defined under FIFA eligibility rules; some limited exceptions apply. Players may hold more than one non-FIFA nationality.

No.	Pos.	Nation	Player
—	DF	LAT	Igors Stepanovs (from RFS/Olimps)
—	MF	LAT	Igors Semjonovs (from Skonto FC)
—	MF	UKR	Volodymir Melnyk (unattached)
—	MF	LAT	Rolands Krjauklis (from Dinaburg FC)
—	MF	LAT	Mihails Poļakovs (from Kauguri/PBLC)
—	FW	LAT	Gatis Kalniņš (from (Cyprus) Othellos Athineou)
—	GK	LAT	Igors Serkovs (from FK Auda)
—	DF	LAT	Sergejs Golubevs (from Skonto FC)
—	MF	LAT	Maksims Kolokoļenkins (from (Germany) Schlossborn FC)
—	MF	RUS	Roman Nagumanov (from (Russia) FC Metallurg-Kuzbass Novokuznetsk)
—	MF	LAT	Mareks Zuntners (from (Azerbaijan) PFC Turan Tovuz)
—	FW	LAT	Grigorijs Batmanovs (from Daugava-2)
—	DF	EST	Vladislav Chichorilkin (from (Estonia) FC Levadia)

Out: Note: Flags indicate national team as defined under FIFA eligibility rules; some limited exceptions apply. Players may hold more than one non-FIFA nationality.

No.	Pos.	Nation	Player
—	FW	LAT	Marians Pahars (retired)
—	FW	LAT	Jurģis Kalns (to FK Liepājas Metalurgs)
—	FW	LAT	Gatis Kalniņš (to (Cyprus) Othellos Athineou)
—	DF	LAT	Aleksandrs Gubins (to FK Jelgava)
—	GK	LAT	Marks Bogdanovs (to FK Jelgava)
—	MF	LAT	Vadims Siņicins (to FK Jelgava)
—	FW	GEO	Gaga Guganashvili (to (Georgia (country)) FC Olimpi Rustavi)
—	DF	LAT	Jurijs Ksenzovs (to (Belarus) FC Vitebsk)
—	DF	LAT	Kirils Jeļkins (to FB Gulbene-2005)
—	MF	LAT	Filips Mihailovskis (released)
—	FW	LAT	Romāns Bespalovs (to FC Tranzit)
—	MF	LAT	Bogdans Ņesterenko (released)
—	MF	LAT	Aleksejs Koļesņikovs (released)

=== JFK Olimps/RFS ===
In: Note: Flags indicate national team as defined under FIFA eligibility rules; some limited exceptions apply. Players may hold more than one non-FIFA nationality.

No.	Pos.	Nation	Player
—	FW	GEO	David Janelidze (from FK Tranzīts Ventspils)
—	DF	GEO	Lasha Gongadze (from (Georgia (country)) Lokomotiv Tbilisi)
—	DF	GEO	Konstantin Zarnadze (from (Georgia (country)) Lokomotiv Tbilisi)
—	DF	LAT	Andrejs Kostjuks (from (Switzerland) Neuchâtel Xamax)
—	GK	LAT	Vitālijs Meļņičenko (from SK Blāzma)
—	GK	LAT	Vitālijs Artjomenko (from Skonto FC)

Out: Note: Flags indicate national team as defined under FIFA eligibility rules; some limited exceptions apply. Players may hold more than one non-FIFA nationality.

No.	Pos.	Nation	Player
—	FW	LAT	Mihails Miholaps (retired)
—	MF	LAT	Andrejs Štolcers (to (England) Bath City F.C.)
—	GK	LAT	Kaspars Ikstens (to Skonto FC)
—	DF	LAT	Renārs Rode (to Skonto FC)
—	FW	LAT	Armands Pētersons (to Skonto FC)
—	FW	LAT	Artūrs Karašausks (to Skonto FC)
—	FW	LAT	Alans Siņeļņikovs (to Skonto FC)
—	FW	LAT	Daniils Turkovs (to Skonto FC)
—	DF	LAT	Igors Stepanovs (to FK Jūrmala)
—	FW	LAT	Ivans Sputajs (to FB Gulbene-2005)
—	MF	LAT	Sergejs Mišins (to FB Gulbene-2005)
—	FW	LAT	Harijs Cepurītis (to FS Metta-Latvijas Universitāte)
—	DF	LAT	Kārlis Putāns (to FS Metta-Latvijas Universitāte)

=== SK Blāzma ===
In: Note: Flags indicate national team as defined under FIFA eligibility rules; some limited exceptions apply. Players may hold more than one non-FIFA nationality.

No.	Pos.	Nation	Player
—	GK	LAT	Vitālijs Voronovs (unattached)
—	DF	LAT	Vadims Javoišs (from (Armenia) Ulisses F.C.)
—	MF	LAT	Deniss Kuzmickis (from FC Tranzīts)
—	MF	BLR	Artsyom Vaskow (from (Azerbaijan) Olimpik-Shuvalan PFC Baku)
—	MF	LAT	Artjoms Osipovs (from (Moldova) FC Sheriff Tiraspol)
—	MF	LAT	Deniss Sokoļskis (unattached)

Out: Note: Flags indicate national team as defined under FIFA eligibility rules; some limited exceptions apply. Players may hold more than one non-FIFA nationality.

No.	Pos.	Nation	Player
—	MF	LAT	Vitālijs Rečickis (to (Cyprus) Aris Limassol)
—	MF	LAT	Boriss Bogdaškins (to FK Jelgava)
—	FW	LAT	Dmitrijs Borisovs (to (Scotland) Clyde F.C.)
—	GK	LAT	Vitālijs Meļņičenko (to JFK Olimps/RFS)
—	DF	LAT	Aleksandrs Ivanovs (to FB Gulbene 2005)
—	DF	LAT	Aleksejs Sergejevs (released)
—	GK	LAT	Igors Labuts (to FB Gulbene 2005)

=== FC Tranzīts ===
In: Note: Flags indicate national team as defined under FIFA eligibility rules; some limited exceptions apply. Players may hold more than one non-FIFA nationality.

No.	Pos.	Nation	Player
—	DF	LAT	Māris Smirnovs (from FK Ventspils)
—	MF	LAT	Andris Kuvšinovs (from (Germany) Schlossborn FC)
—	FW	LAT	Nikolajs Kozačuks (from (Azerbaijan) Olimpik Baku)
—	GK	BLR	Pavel Chasnowski (from FK Ventspils)
—	GK	RUS	Arbi Mezhiev (from (Russia) FC Lokomotiv Moscow)
—	DF	LAT	Aleksejs Soleičuks (from FK Ventspils)
—	DF	LAT	Aigars Catlakšs (from Daugavpils BJSS)
—	MF	CMR	Serge Hyacinthe Tatiefang (from (Mexico) Estudiantes Tecos)
—	MF	LAT	Ivans Visockis (from Daugavpils BJSS)
—	MF	COL	Roger Henao Cañas (from (Colombia) Independiente Medellín)
—	FW	LAT	Romāns Bespalovs (from FK Jūrmala)
—	DF	RUS	Ivan Stain (from (Russia) FC Nizhny Novgorod)
—	FW	LAT	Maksims Doiņikovs (unattached)

Out: Note: Flags indicate national team as defined under FIFA eligibility rules; some limited exceptions apply. Players may hold more than one non-FIFA nationality.

No.	Pos.	Nation	Player
—	FW	CZE	Dario Torbič (to (Slovenia) NK Rudar Velenje)
—	MF	LAT	Aleksandrs Gramovičs (to (Scotland) Clyde F.C.)
—	MF	LAT	Deniss Kuzmickis (to SK Blāzma)
—	FW	GEO	David Janelidze (to RFS/Olimps)
—	FW	LTU	Roland Solomin (released)
—	DF	LAT	Dmitrijs Kuzmins (released)
—	DF	LAT	Kirils Mītiņš (released)

=== FK Jelgava ===
In: Note: Flags indicate national team as defined under FIFA eligibility rules; some limited exceptions apply. Players may hold more than one non-FIFA nationality.

No.	Pos.	Nation	Player
—	MF	USA	Nate Weiss (unattached)
—	DF	LAT	Māris Savinovs (from FS Metta-Latvijas Universitāte)
—	DF	LAT	Mārcis Savinovs (from FS Metta-Latvijas Universitāte)
—	MF	LAT	Gints Freimanis (from (Republic of Ireland) St. Patrick's Athletic F.C.)
—	FW	LAT	Aleksejs Bespalovs (from FK Jauniba)
—	DF	LAT	Aleksandrs Gubins (from FK Jūrmala)
—	GK	LAT	Marks Bogdanovs (from FK Jūrmala)
—	FW	LAT	Vladislavs Kozlovs (from FS Metta-Latvijas Universitāte)
—	MF	LAT	Boriss Bogdaškins (from SK Blāzma)
—	MF	LAT	Vadims Siņicins (from FK Jūrmala)
—	DF	LAT	Jevgēņijs Kazura (from (Hungary) Nyíregyháza Spartacus)
—	MF	LAT	Dmitrijs Medeckis (from (Greece) Fokikos F.C.)
—	FW	LAT	Jaroslavs Zoricovs (from Skonto FC-2)
—	FW	LAT	Oļegs Malašenoks (from (Malta) Hibernians F.C.)
—	MF	LAT	Artis Lazdiņš (from FK Ventspils)

Out: Note: Flags indicate national team as defined under FIFA eligibility rules; some limited exceptions apply. Players may hold more than one non-FIFA nationality.

No.	Pos.	Nation	Player
—	GK	LAT	Nauris Smaļķis (to FK Auda)
—	MF	LAT	Artjoms Lonščakovs (to (Germany) 1. FC Neubrandenburg 04)
—	FW	LAT	Kārlis Kinderēvičs (to FK Jelgava-2)
—	DF	LAT	Māris Dūrējs (to FK Jelgava-2)
—	DF	LAT	Jurijs Fjodorovs (to FK Jelgava-2)
—	DF	LAT	Andrejs Dementjevs (to FK Jelgava-2)
—	FW	LAT	Vugar Askerov (to FC Jūrmala)
—	GK	LTU	Šarunas Kazlauskas (released)

=== FK Jaunība ===
In: Note: Flags indicate national team as defined under FIFA eligibility rules; some limited exceptions apply. Players may hold more than one non-FIFA nationality.

No.	Pos.	Nation	Player
—	FW	EST	Alen Stepanjan (on loan from (Estonia) FC Flora Tallinn)
—	MF	EST	Oleg Maksimov (from (Finland) Kokkolan Palloveikot)
—	MF	EST	Roal Aliev (from (Estonia) FC Levadia Tallinn)
—	MF	LAT	Jurijs Krasņakovs (unattached)
—	DF	LAT	Ņikita Pavļiks (from Skonto-2)
—	DF	LAT	Filips Pavļiks (from Skonto-2)
—	DF	LAT	Marks Molčanovs (from Skonto-2)

Out: Note: Flags indicate national team as defined under FIFA eligibility rules; some limited exceptions apply. Players may hold more than one non-FIFA nationality.

No.	Pos.	Nation	Player
—	FW	LAT	Aleksejs Bespalovs (to FK Jelgava)

=== FC Daugava ===
In: Note: Flags indicate national team as defined under FIFA eligibility rules; some limited exceptions apply. Players may hold more than one non-FIFA nationality.

No.	Pos.	Nation	Player
—	GK	LAT	Māris Eltermanis (from FK Ventspils)
—	GK	LAT	Giorgijs Čizovs (from Daugavpils BJSS)
—	DF	RUS	Yuriy Shelenkov (from (Uzbekistan) Navbahor Namangan)
—	DF	UKR	Igor Dudnik (from (Ukraine) FC Zakarpattia Uzhhorod)
—	DF	LAT	Tomass Pučinsks (from Daugavpils BJSS)
—	DF	GEO	Giorgi Chickradze (from (Georgia (country)) Dinamo Tbilisi)
—	MF	GEO	Jamal Jaliashvili (from (Georgia (country)) FC Gagra Tbilisi)
—	FW	LAT	Vitālijs Ziļs (from (Poland) Wigry Suwałki)
—	FW	LAT	Ričards Raščevskis (from Daugavpils BJSS)
—	FW	UKR	Andriy Poroshyn (from (Russia) FC Salyut Belgorod)
—	FW	RUS	Murad Ramazanov (from (Russia) FC Anzhi Makhachkala)

Out: Note: Flags indicate national team as defined under FIFA eligibility rules; some limited exceptions apply. Players may hold more than one non-FIFA nationality.

No.	Pos.	Nation	Player
—	DF	LAT	Aleksejs Kuplovs-Oginskis (released)
—	FW	LAT	Jans Radevičs (to FB Gulbene-2005)
—	MF	LAT	Dmitrijs Vorobjovs (to FB Gulbene-2005)
