= List of Latvian football transfers winter 2011–12 =

This is a list of Latvian football transfers in the 2011–2012 winter transfer window by club. Only transfers of the Virsliga are included.

All transfers mentioned are shown in the references at the bottom of the page. If you wish to insert a transfer that isn't mentioned there, please add a reference.

== Latvian Higher League ==
=== Ventspils ===
In: Note: Flags indicate national team as defined under FIFA eligibility rules; some limited exceptions apply. Players may hold more than one non-FIFA nationality.

No.	Pos.	Nation	Player
—	GK	LAT	Vitālijs Meļņičenko (free)
—	DF	LAT	Raivis Hščanovičs (from Jūrmala-VV)
—	DF	LAT	Oļegs Timofejevs (from Daugava)
—	DF	LAT	Vitālijs Smirnovs (from Skonto Riga)
—	DF	LAT	Vitālijs Stols (loan return from Gulbene)
—	MF	NGR	Michael Tukura (loan return from (Russia) Rubin Kazan)
—	MF	LAT	Visvaldis Ignatāns (loan return from Jelgava)
—	MF	LAT	Romāns Bespalovs (loan return from Jelgava)
—	MF	MDA	Igor Ţîgîrlaş (on loan from (Ukraine) Chornomorets Odesa)
—	MF	LAT	Pāvels Hohlovs (from (Poland) Polonia Leszno)
—	MF	RUS	Igor Gilmanov (from (Russia) Rubin-2 Kazan)
—	MF	NGR	Christian John Agoh (from (Nigeria) Kwara Football Academy)
—	FW	LAT	Daniils Turkovs (from (Hungary) Zalaegerszegi TE)

Out: Note: Flags indicate national team as defined under FIFA eligibility rules; some limited exceptions apply. Players may hold more than one non-FIFA nationality.

No.	Pos.	Nation	Player
2	DF	RUS	Pavel Mochalin (free)
4	DF	RUS	Yevgeny Postnikov (to (Belarus) Shakhtyor Soligorsk)
5	MF	LAT	Jevgēņijs Kosmačovs (on loan to (Ukraine) Sevastopol)
7	FW	LAT	Nikolajs Kozačuks (to Jūrmala-VV)
10	MF	LAT	Oļegs Žatkins (on loan to Jelgava)
11	MF	JPN	Yasuhiro Kato (to (Ukraine) Hoverla-Zakarpattia Uzhhorod)
12	DF	LAT	Igors Savčenkovs (to Skonto Riga)
14	MF	LAT	Oļegs Laizāns (to (Poland) ŁKS Łódź)
18	DF	JPN	Naoya Shibamura (to (Uzbekistan) Pakhtakor Tashkent)
25	MF	LAT	Ritvars Rugins (to (Ukraine) Illichivets Mariupol)
26	DF	LAT	Vladislavs Gabovs (to METTA/LU)
54	GK	RUS	Arbi Mezhiev (to (Russia) Dynamo Stavropol)
—	DF	LAT	Vitālijs Stols (free)
—	MF	LAT	Deniss Tarasovs (to Spartaks, previously on loan)

=== Liepājas Metalurgs ===
In: Note: Flags indicate national team as defined under FIFA eligibility rules; some limited exceptions apply. Players may hold more than one non-FIFA nationality.

No.	Pos.	Nation	Player
—	GK	LAT	Raivo Varažinskis (loan return from Varavīksne)
—	GK	LAT	Toms Vīksna (from Liepājas Metalurgs-2)
—	DF	LTU	Mindaugas Bagužis (from (Lithuania) Kruoja Pakruojis)
—	DF	LAT	Oskars Kļava (from (Russia) Anzhi Makhachkala)
—	MF	LAT	Valērijs Afanasjevs (from Daugava)

Out: Note: Flags indicate national team as defined under FIFA eligibility rules; some limited exceptions apply. Players may hold more than one non-FIFA nationality.

No.	Pos.	Nation	Player
1	GK	LAT	Edgars Potapenko (on loan to Liepājas Metalurgs-2)
3	DF	LAT	Toms Mežs (to Jūrmala-VV)
8	MF	LAT	Igors Aleksejevs (to Jūrmala)
10	MF	LTU	Nerijus Valskis (to (Belarus) Minsk)
16	MF	LTU	Marius Činikas (to (Belarus) Minsk)
23	FW	LAT	Dāvis Ikaunieks (on loan to Liepājas Metalurgs-2)
28	DF	LAT	Antons Jemeļins (to Spartaks)
31	GK	LAT	Viktors Spole (retired)
77	FW	LTU	Vitalijus Kavaliauskas (to (Lithuania) Ekranas)

=== Daugava Daugavpils ===
In: Note: Flags indicate national team as defined under FIFA eligibility rules; some limited exceptions apply. Players may hold more than one non-FIFA nationality.

No.	Pos.	Nation	Player
—	GK	LAT	Kaspars Ikstens (from Skonto Riga)
—	GK	LAT	Igors Serkovs (from Jūrmala-VV)
—	DF	CRO	Matija Mihalj (from (Croatia) HNK Gorica)
—	DF	RUS	Dmitri Polovinchuk (from (Russia) Torpedo Vladimir)
—	DF	RUS	Andrei Ivanov (from (Russia) Gubkin)
—	MF	LAT	Maksims Rafaļskis (from (Russia) Baltika Kaliningrad)
—	MF	RUS	Andrei Streltsov (from (Russia) Dynamo Bryansk)
—	MF	RUS	Sergei Yashin (from (Russia) Volga Nizhny Novgorod)
—	MF	RUS	Yuri Mamaev (from (Russia) Baltika Kaliningrad)
—	FW	LAT	Guntars Silagailis (from Jūrmala)

Out: Note: Flags indicate national team as defined under FIFA eligibility rules; some limited exceptions apply. Players may hold more than one non-FIFA nationality.

No.	Pos.	Nation	Player
1	GK	LAT	Māris Eltermanis (to (Lithuania) Kruoja Pakruojis)
3	MF	LAT	Rolands Jankovskis (on loan to BFC Daugava)
4	DF	RUS	Yuriy Kotyukov (free)
5	DF	LAT	Oļegs Timofejevs (to Ventspils)
8	MF	GEO	Giorgi Chikhradze (to (Georgia (country)) Chikhura Sachkhere)
10	FW	BRA	Lima (to (Brazil) Associação Desportiva Recreativa e Cultural Icasa)
15	DF	RUS	Yuri Shelenkov (retired)
19	MF	LAT	Valērijs Afanasjevs (to Liepājas Metalurgs)
21	MF	BRA	Allanzinho (free)
26	DF	LAT	Vladimirs Žavoronkovs (retired)
35	GK	LAT	Georgijs Čižovs (on loan to BFC Daugava)
36	MF	GEO	Jamal Jaliashvili (free)

=== Skonto ===
In: Note: Flags indicate national team as defined under FIFA eligibility rules; some limited exceptions apply. Players may hold more than one non-FIFA nationality.

No.	Pos.	Nation	Player
—	GK	GER	Michael Kaltenhauser (loan return from (Estonia) Sillamäe Kalev)
—	DF	LAT	Vadims Gaiļus (loan return from Olimps)
—	DF	UKR	Sergiy Shmatovalenko (from (Ukraine) Dynamo-2 Kyiv)
—	DF	MKD	Bojan Gjorgievski (on loan from (Belarus) BATE Borisov)
—	DF	LAT	Igors Savčenkovs (from Ventspils)
—	DF	RUS	Roman Amirkhanov (from (Russia) Olimpia Gelendzhik)
—	DF	RUS	Adil Ibragimov (on loan from (Russia) Fakel Voronezh)
—	DF	RUS	Aleksandr Kukanos (from (Russia) Baltika Kaliningrad)
—	DF	LAT	Toms Rajeckis (from Olimps)
—	MF	LAT	Vjačeslavs Isajevs (from Olimps)
—	MF	LAT	Vladislavs Glutkovskis (from Olimps)
—	MF	PAN	Julio Segundo (from (Peru) Sport Boys)
—	FW	LAT	Nikolajs Zaicevs (loan return from Olimps)
—	FW	LTU	Tadas Labukas (free)

Out: Note: Flags indicate national team as defined under FIFA eligibility rules; some limited exceptions apply. Players may hold more than one non-FIFA nationality.

No.	Pos.	Nation	Player
1	GK	LAT	Kaspars Ikstens (to Daugava)
3	DF	LAT	Kaspars Dubra (to (Poland) Polonia Bytom)
4	DF	LAT	Vitālijs Smirnovs (to Ventspils)
5	DF	GEO	Ivane Kandelaki (to (Georgia (country)) Dila Gori)
7	FW	BRA	Nathan Júnior (to (Austria) Kapfenberger SV)
11	MF	BRA	Fabinho (to (Brazil) Botafogo)
13	FW	RUS	Andrei Nikolayev (free)
19	MF	LAT	Igors Tarasovs (to (Azerbaijan) Simurq Zaqatala)
22	MF	RSA	Bally Smart (free)
24	FW	RUS	Anton Volkov (to Skonto-2)
—	GK	GER	Michael Kaltenhauser (to (Estonia) Tammeka Tartu)
—	DF	LAT	Vadims Gaiļus (to Jelgava)

=== Jūrmala ===
In: Note: Flags indicate national team as defined under FIFA eligibility rules; some limited exceptions apply. Players may hold more than one non-FIFA nationality.

No.	Pos.	Nation	Player
—	GK	LAT	Pāvels Davidovs (from (Uzbekistan) Mash'al Mubarek)
—	GK	LAT	Jānis Krūmiņš (from Olimps)
—	GK	LAT	Jevgēņijs Laizāns (from Olimps)
—	DF	LAT	Staņislavs Pihockis (from (Lithuania) Kruoja Pakruojis)
—	DF	LAT	Ingus Šlampe (from Jūrmala-VV)
—	DF	RUS	Mikhail Milshin (from (Russia) Dush Nr. 80 Moscow)
—	DF	LAT	Sergejs Golubevs (from Jūrmala-VV)
—	MF	LAT	Igors Aleksejevs (from Liepājas Metalurgs)
—	MF	LAT	Oskars Ikstens (from Rīgas Futbola skola)
—	MF	LAT	Deniss Ostrovskis (from Jūrmala-VV)
—	MF	RUS	Igor Byrlov (from (Russia) SKA-Energiya Khabarovsk)
—	MF	LAT	Vadims Žuļevs (free)
—	FW	LAT	Artjoms Osipovs (from Olimps)
—	FW	AZE	Ilvi Gaibov (from (Russia) Serp i Molot Moscow)
—	FW	LAT	Edijs Joksts (from Ventspils-2)

Out: Note: Flags indicate national team as defined under FIFA eligibility rules; some limited exceptions apply. Players may hold more than one non-FIFA nationality.

No.	Pos.	Nation	Player
3	DF	LAT	Deniss Sokoļskis (to Jūrmala-VV)
6	MF	RUS	Konstantin Belov (loan return to (Russia) Khimki)
8	MF	LAT	Vadims Gospodars (to Jūrmala-VV)
10	FW	RUS	Vyacheslav Seletskiy (free)
11	FW	LAT	Intars Kirhners (to (Lithuania) Šiauliai)
12	GK	LAT	Deniss Pavlovskis (free)
16	GK	LAT	Maksims Vitkovskis (free)
33	DF	LAT	Vadims Javoišs (free)
33	FW	LAT	Vīts Rimkus (to Spartaks)
37	GK	LAT	Pāvels Naglis (to Spartaks)
69	FW	LAT	Guntars Silagailis (to Daugava)
77	DF	LAT	Dmitrijs Šiļuks (to Jūrmala-VV)
89	MF	LAT	Jevgēņijs Koršakovs (free)
91	MF	LAT	Rolands Krjauklis (to (Finland) Marmiksen Kuula)
99	FW	RUS	Pavel Kiryanov (free)
—	DF	LAT	Viktors Terentjevs (to Spartaks)
—	MF	CMR	Jocelyn Abada (free)

=== Jelgava ===
In: Note: Flags indicate national team as defined under FIFA eligibility rules; some limited exceptions apply. Players may hold more than one non-FIFA nationality.

No.	Pos.	Nation	Player
—	DF	LAT	Alberts Bārbalis (from Jūrmala-VV)
—	DF	LAT	Artūrs Kļimovičs (from Olimps)
—	DF	LAT	Vadims Gaiļus (from Skonto Riga)
—	MF	JPN	Rei Ishikawa (from (Canada) North York Astros)
—	MF	LTU	Mindaugas Grigaravičius (from (Lithuania) Klaipėda)
—	MF	LAT	Oļegs Žatkins (on loan from Ventspils)
—	FW	LTU	Deividas Lukošius (from (Lithuania) Klaipėda)
—	FW	LAT	Kristaps Neilands (from Jelgava-2)
—	FW	LAT	Kārlis Kinderēvičs (from Jelgava-2)

Out: Note: Flags indicate national team as defined under FIFA eligibility rules; some limited exceptions apply. Players may hold more than one non-FIFA nationality.

No.	Pos.	Nation	Player
6	DF	LAT	Valdis Kaļva (free)
11	FW	LAT	Gatis Kalniņš (to METTA/LU)
15	MF	LAT	Visvaldis Ignatāns (loan return to Ventspils)
19	MF	LAT	Aivars Ķeris (free)
20	MF	LAT	Romāns Bespalovs (loan return to Ventspils)
22	GK	LAT	Niks Rubezis (to (Spain) Hércules)
28	FW	BLR	Ales Navumik (free)
55	DF	LAT	Māris Savinovs (to METTA/LU)
85	MF	LAT	Gints Freimanis (to (Germany) Pommern Greifswald)

=== Gulbene ===
In: Note: Flags indicate national team as defined under FIFA eligibility rules; some limited exceptions apply. Players may hold more than one non-FIFA nationality.

No.	Pos.	Nation	Player
—	DF	JPN	Toshikazu Irie (from (Japan) Tochigi)
—	DF	JPN	Shouhei Tsuchiya (from (Japan) Kansai University)
—	DF	JPN	Shota Yanagi (from (Japan) Kagoshima Jitsugyo High School)
—	DF	LAT	Zintis Milaknis (from youth system)
—	MF	KOR	Seung Ki Yoo (from (Japan) JEF United Ichihara Chiba Reserves)
—	MF	JPN	Ryota Ishikawa (from (Japan) Osaka F.C.)
—	MF	LAT	Anatolijs Maksimenko (from Olimps)
—	MF	LAT	Nils Sitenkovs (from Varavīksne)
—	MF	GEO	Lado Datunashvili (from (Moldova) Nistru Otaci)
—	FW	JPN	Yōsuke Saito (from Albirex Niigata Singapore)
—	FW	LAT	Edijs Skurjats (from youth system)
—	FW	LAT	Mareks Kozlovskis (from youth system)

Out: Note: Flags indicate national team as defined under FIFA eligibility rules; some limited exceptions apply. Players may hold more than one non-FIFA nationality.

No.	Pos.	Nation	Player
5	DF	JPN	Masaki Hemmi (to (United States) Rochester Rhinos)
8	MF	GEO	Shalva Purtseladze (free)
9	MF	GEO	Nukri Gogokhia (free)
10	FW	JPN	Hideaki Takeda (to (Estonia) Nõmme Kalju)
12	MF	GEO	David Tsiskarishvili (free)
14	MF	LAT	Kristaps Priedēns (to METTA/LU)
15	DF	LAT	Vitālijs Stols (loan return to Ventspils)
20	FW	GEO	Irakli Arveladze (free)

=== Daugava Riga (former Jūrmala-VV) ===
In: Note: Flags indicate national team as defined under FIFA eligibility rules; some limited exceptions apply. Players may hold more than one non-FIFA nationality.

No.	Pos.	Nation	Player
—	GK	LAT	Kristaps Dzelme (from (Lithuania) Kruoja Pakruojis)
—	GK	LAT	Artūrs Vaičulis (free)
—	DF	LAT	Deniss Sokoļskis (from Jūrmala)
—	DF	LAT	Dmitrijs Šiļuks (from Jūrmala)
—	DF	LAT	Toms Mežs (from Liepājas Metalurgs)
—	DF	LAT	Reinis Broders (from Olimps)
—	DF	LAT	Ernests Pilats (free)
—	MF	LAT	Vadims Gospodars (from Jūrmala)
—	MF	LAT	Sandis Bokta (from Olimps)
—	MF	LAT	Aleksandrs Šumilovs (free)
—	MF	LAT	Otto Rihters (from Rēzekne/BJSS)
—	MF	RUS	Kirill Korban (free)
—	MF	LAT	Bogdans Petruks (from Liepājas Metalurgs-2)
—	MF	UKR	Stepan Glubokiy (from (Ukraine) Dnipro Dnipropetrovsk Reserves)
—	FW	LAT	Nikolajs Kozačuks (from Ventspils)
—	FW	LAT	Artis Novickis (free)
—	FW	LAT	Edgars Kārkliņš (from (Sweden) Rydaholms GoIF)
—	FW	LAT	Artjoms Uļjanovs (from Rīgas Futbola Skola)
—	FW	RUS	Alexey Alekseev (from (Estonia) Sillamäe Kalev)
—	FW	LAT	Vitālijs Ziļs (free)
—	FW	UKR	Vadim Gryppa (from (Ukraine) Dynamo-2 Kyiv)

Out: Note: Flags indicate national team as defined under FIFA eligibility rules; some limited exceptions apply. Players may hold more than one non-FIFA nationality.

No.	Pos.	Nation	Player
2	DF	LAT	Vitālijs Jagodinskis (to (Ukraine) Dynamo Kyiv)
3	DF	LAT	Sergejs Golubevs (to Jūrmala)
4	DF	UKR	Oleksandr Krutskevich (to (China) Harbin Yiteng)
5	DF	LAT	Ingus Šlampe (to Jūrmala)
6	DF	LAT	Igors Stepanovs (retired)
8	MF	LAT	Romāns Bezzubovs (retired)
11	FW	BRA	Leonardo (free)
12	MF	LAT	Deniss Ostrovskis (to Jūrmala)
16	GK	LAT	Igors Serkovs (to Daugava)
18	DF	LAT	Alberts Bārbalis (to Jelgava)
23	GK	EST	Mihhail Lavrentjev (to (Estonia) Kuressaare)
24	DF	LAT	Raivis Hščanovičs (to Ventspils)
—	GK	LAT	Kristaps Dzelme (to (Romania) Mureşul Deva)

=== METTA/LU ===
In: Note: Flags indicate national team as defined under FIFA eligibility rules; some limited exceptions apply. Players may hold more than one non-FIFA nationality.

No.	Pos.	Nation	Player
—	GK	LAT	Artūrs Biezais (from Spartaks)
—	DF	LAT	Vladislavs Gabovs (from Ventspils)
—	DF	LAT	Māris Savinovs (from Jelgava)
—	DF	LAT	Mārcis Savinovs (free)
—	MF	LAT	Kristaps Priedēns (from Gulbene)
—	FW	LAT	Gatis Kalniņš (from Jelgava)

Out: Note: Flags indicate national team as defined under FIFA eligibility rules; some limited exceptions apply. Players may hold more than one non-FIFA nationality.

No.	Pos.	Nation	Player
4	MF	LAT	Jaroslavs Zoricovs (on loan to METTA-2)
13	DF	LAT	Toms Aizgrāvis (retired)
19	MF	LAT	Raitis Grablovskis (on loan to METTA-2)
25	DF	LAT	Ēriks Melbārdis (on loan to METTA-2)
—	?	LAT	Artašes Daniljans (on loan to METTA-2)
—	DF	LAT	Artis Ostrovskis (on loan to METTA-2)
—	?	LAT	Maikls Poļakovs (on loan to METTA-2)
—	?	LAT	Artūrs Švalbe (on loan to METTA-2)

=== Spartaks ===
In: Note: Flags indicate national team as defined under FIFA eligibility rules; some limited exceptions apply. Players may hold more than one non-FIFA nationality.

No.	Pos.	Nation	Player
—	GK	LAT	Pāvels Naglis (from Jūrmala)
—	GK	LAT	Jānis Skābardis (from Auda)
—	GK	LAT	Andrejs Pavlovs (from (Bulgaria) Lokomotiv Plovdiv)
—	DF	LAT	Edgars Puliņš (free)
—	DF	COL	Duvan Castañeda (from (Colombia) Deportivo Gallegol)
—	DF	LAT	Antons Jemeļins (from Liepājas Metalurgs)
—	DF	LAT	Dmitrijs Plukaitis (free)
—	MF	GHA	Joseph Gyawu (from (Ghana) Asokwa Warriors)
—	MF	LAT	Deniss Tarasovs (from Ventspils, previously on loan)
—	MF	COL	Jose Mesa (from (Colombia) Deportivo Gallegol)
—	MF	ITA	Andrea Casimirri (from (Italy) A.S.D Buttrio)
—	MF	LAT	Viktors Morozs (from (Cyprus) PAEEK FC)
—	FW	COL	David Cortés (loan return from (Moldova) Sheriff Tiraspol)
—	FW	GHA	Patrick Twumasi (from Red Bull Ghana)
—	FW	LAT	Vīts Rimkus (from Jūrmala)
—	FW	UKR	Yaroslav Sokol (from (Ukraine) Dynamo-2 Kyiv)
—	DF	LAT	Viktors Terentjevs (from Jūrmala)

Out: Note: Flags indicate national team as defined under FIFA eligibility rules; some limited exceptions apply. Players may hold more than one non-FIFA nationality.

No.	Pos.	Nation	Player
2	DF	LAT	Nikolajs Kulmanakovs (free)
3	DF	LAT	Pāvels Skaļenko (free)
1	GK	LAT	Artūrs Biezais (to METTA/LU)
4	DF	COL	Ezequiel Palomeque (on loan to (Czech Republic) Sigma Olomouc)
7	FW	COL	Daniel Buitrago (on loan to (Russia) Spartak Nalchik)
8	DF	LAT	Mihails Poļakovs (free)
10	MF	LAT	Vitālijs Morgačovs (free)
10	FW	LAT	Vitālijs Puškovs (free)
18	DF	LAT	Aleksejs Dmitrijevs (free)
21	FW	LAT	Igors Avanesovs (free)
29	DF	LAT	Andrejs Berkuta (free)
30	GK	RUS	Aleksandr Nevokshonov (released)
32	FW	LAT	Vīts Rimkus (free)
