= 2009 Latvian Higher League =

Latvian football league season for the highest division

Latvian Higher League
- Season: 2009
- Champions: Liepājas Metalurgs
- Relegated: Dinaburg FC; Daugava Riga
- Champions League: Liepājas Metalurgs
- Europa League: Jelgava (via domestic cup); FK Ventspils; Skonto Rīga
- Baltic League: FK Ventspils (reigning champions); Liepājas Metalurgs; Skonto Rīga; FK Jūrmala-VV; RFS/Olimps; Blāzma Rēzekne
- Matches: 138
- Goals: 453 (3.28 per match)
- Biggest home win: Ventspils 8–0 Daugava Rīga
- Biggest away win: Daugava Rīga 1–8 Skonto; Blāzma 0–7 Skonto; Olimps/RFS 0–7 Skonto
- Highest scoring: Daugava Rīga 2–8 Liepājas Metalurgs (10 goals)

Latvian Higher League 2009 (Latvian: Virslīga) was the 18th season of top-tier football in Latvia. It began on 14 March 2009 with the first round of games and ended on 8 November 2009 with the 36th round of matches. Ventspils were the defending champions.

Due to numerous pre-season team changes, such as club mergers and withdrawals, the format of the league was changed. Since there are only 9 clubs that participate in 2009 Virslīga, every team plays 4 times against every other team, what will make every team playing 32 games. Contrary to the previous season, there is not Championship and Relegation pool.

== Teams ==
Olimps Rīga were relegated after finishing the relegation round in last place. They were replaced by First League champions FK Daugava Riga.

Blāzma won the promotion/relegation play-off against Tranzīts Ventspils with 6–1 on aggregate. However, after several mergers and withdrawals Tranzīts were also awarded a place in Virslīga, as the runners-up of First League.

FK Rīga withdrew due to unpaid debts. They eventually merged with Olimps Rīga and created a new club called Olimps/RFS. The new club plays in Virslīga, what saved Olimps Rīga from relegation.

On 12 January 2009 Vindava withdrew from Virslīga due to financial reasons.

FK Jūrmala merged with JFC Kauguri/Multibanka, which is also a merger of JFC Kauguri Jūrmala and FK Multibanka Rīga, to a new club named FK Jūrmala-VV. The new club carried over the players and other personnel from FK Jūrmala.

Daugava Daugavpils and Dinaburg also merged and remained under the Dinaburg FC name. It is not yet certain which club's staff will operate the new club. Dinaburg also took Daugava's 2009–10 UEFA Europa League spot.

Location of teams in the Latvian Higher League 2009

Club	Location	Stadium	Capacity	Current manager
Blāzma	Rēzekne	Sporta Aģentūras Stadions	3,000	(Latvia) Žanis Ārmanis
Daugava	Riga	Salaspils Stadium	648	(Latvia) Vladimirs Beļajevs
Dinaburg	Daugavpils	Celtnieks Stadium	4,070	(Georgia (country)) Tamaz Pertia
FK Jūrmala-VV	Jūrmala	Slokas Stadium	5,000	(Latvia) Vladimirs Babičevs
Metalurgs	Liepāja	Daugava Stadium	5,083	(Germany) Rüdiger Abramczik
Olimps/RFS	Riga	Daugava Stadium	5,008	(Netherlands) Anton Joore
Skonto	Riga	Skonto Stadium	9,500	(England) Paul Ashworth
Tranzīts	Ventspils	Ventspils 2. pamatskolas stadions	500	(Uzbekistan) Igor Kichigin
FK Ventspils	Ventspils	Olimpiskais Stadium	3,085	(Italy) Nunzio Zavettieri

== League table ==
Pos	Team	Pld	W	D	L	GF	GA	GD	Pts	Qualification or relegation
1	Liepājas Metalurgs (C)	32	25	4	3	96	23	+73	79	Qualification for Champions League second qualifying round
2	Ventspils	32	23	5	4	89	21	+68	74	Qualification for Europa League second qualifying round
3	Skonto	32	23	4	5	98	30	+68	73	Qualification for Europa League first qualifying round
4	Jūrmala-VV	32	12	4	16	42	60	−18	40	
5	Olimps/RFS	32	11	5	16	53	60	−7	38	
6	Blāzma Rēzekne	32	7	5	20	30	71	−41	26	
7	Tranzīts Ventspils	32	2	10	20	22	65	−43	16	
8	Daugava Rīga (R)	32	3	5	24	26	116	−90	14	Qualification for relegation play-offs
9	Dinaburg (Note: Dinaburg were excluded from the league due to match-fixing related to betting which involved Dinaburg's president Oļegs Gavrilovs and head coach Tamaz Pertia.) (R)	32	15	4	13	31	39	−8	49	Relegation to Latvian First League

Source: Latvian Football Federation (in Latvian)
Rules for classification: 1st points; 2nd head-to-head points; 3rd head-to-head goal difference; 4th overall wins; 5th goal difference; 6th goals scored.
(C) Champions; (R) Relegated

== Results ==
=== First half of season ===
Home \ Away	BLĀ	DGR	DIN	JVV	LIE	RFS	SKO	TRA	VEN
Blāzma Rēzekne		4–3	1–2	1–2	0–3	0–1	0–7	1–0	0–3
Daugava Rīga	1–1		0–3	1–1	1–4	1–5	1–7	2–0	1–5
Dinaburg FC	1–0	1–0		1–2	0–3	2–1	1–1	2–0	1–0
FK Jūrmala-VV	3–0	1–1	1–0		1–1	0–1	0–3	4–2	0–3
SK Liepājas Metalurgs	4–0	1–0	3–1	2–2		5–1	4–0	5–0	2–1
Olimps/RFS	1–1	4–0	1–1	2–3	1–2		1–8	1–1	1–5
Skonto FC	4–0	6–0	3–2	3–0	2–1	2–0		1–0	1–3
Tranzīts Ventspils	0–0	3–3	1–1	1–2	0–1	0–0	1–1		0–3
Ventspils	5–1	4–2	0–0	3–0	1–1	1–0	2–1	1–1	

Source: Latvian Football Federation (in Latvian)
Legend: Blue = home team win; Yellow = draw; Red = away team win.

=== Second half of season ===
Home \ Away	BLĀ	DGR	DIN	JVV	LIE	RFS	SKO	TRA	VEN
Blāzma Rēzekne		4–0	3–0 (Note: Dinaburg were excluded from the league due to match-fixing related to betting which involved Dinaburg's president Oļegs Gavrilovs and head coach Tamaz Pertia. Dinaburg's remaining matches will be awarded to their opponents with 3–0.)	0–3	1–3	3–1	0–1	1–0	0–2
Daugava Rīga	0–3		3–0	0–3	2–8	0–5	0–7	2–1	0–5
Dinaburg FC	1–0	1–0		2–0	1–2	0–3	0–3	2–1	0–3
FK Jūrmala-VV	0–2	3–1	0–1		1–4	1–0	0–5	1–2	0–4
SK Liepājas Metalurgs	6–0	3–0	3–0	4–1		3–0	0–1	4–0	1–1
Olimps/RFS	3–2	7–0	0–1	2–0	1–5		0–2	2–1	0–2
Skonto FC	4–0	7–0	0–1	3–2	1–6	3–3		4–1	0–0
Tranzīts Ventspils	1–1	1–1	0–2	1–4	1–0	0–2	1–3		0–1
Ventspils	5–0	8–0	1–0	4–1	1–2	5–3	0–2	7–0	

Source: Latvian Football Federation (in Latvian)
Legend: Blue = home team win; Yellow = draw; Red = away team win.

=== Relegation play-offs ===
Since there are only 9 clubs participating in 2009 Virslīga, no teams will be directly relegated. 9th placed Virslīga team and runners-up of First League will compete in relegation play-offs for one spot in Virslīga 2010. The other spot will be taken by First League champions. Since one of the teams were excluded from the league, the relegation play-off will be replaced with the direct promotion of the First League team placing second.

== Team of the season 2009 ==
Goalkeepers: Viktors Spole (FK Liepājas Metalurgs ), Aleksandrs Vlasovs (Skonto FC )

Defenders: Oskars Kļava (FK Liepājas Metalurgs ), Grigori Chirkin (FK Ventspils ), Deniss Ivanovs (FK Liepājas Metalurgs ), David Gamezardashvili (Skonto FC ), Tomas Tamošauskas (FK Liepājas Metalurgs ), Vitālijs Smirnovs (Skonto FC ), Deniss Kačanovs (FK Ventspils ), Dzintars Zirnis (FK Liepājas Metalurgs )

Midfielders: Jurijs Žigajevs (FK Ventspils ), Andrejs Prohorenkovs (FK Liepājas Metalurgs ), Vitālijs Astafjevs (FK Ventspils ), Jevgēņijs Kosmačovs (FK Ventspils ), Maksims Rafaļskis (FK Liepājas Metalurgs ), Igors Kozlovs (Skonto FC ), Pāvels Surņins (FK Liepājas Metalurgs ), Igor Tigirlas (FK Ventspils )

Forwards: Vits Rimkus (FK Ventspils ), Vladimir Dvalishvili (Skonto FC ), Kristaps Grebis (FK Liepājas Metalurgs ), Ģirts Karlsons (FK Liepājas Metalurgs )

== See also ==
- 2009–10 Latvian Cup
