= 2009–10 Baltic League =

Football club tournament held between the top clubs from Baltic states

Baltic League
- Season: 2009–10
- Dates: 22 September 2009 – 4 July 2010
- Champions: (Latvia) Ventspils (1st title)
- Matches: 28
- Goals: 56 (2 per match)
- Top goalscorer: (Estonia) Vjatšeslav Zahovaiko (4 goals)

The 2009–2010 Baltic League (known as the Triobet Baltic League for sponsorship reasons) is a 16-team football tournament held in the Baltic states. Five top teams from each participating country – Estonia, Latvia, and Lithuania – along with the winner of the 2008 season will play a 4 round and 2 legged (excluding final) play-off style knockout tournament. It is held from Autumn 2009 through Summer 2010.

== Teams ==
- (Estonia) Meistriliiga – Levadia (1st), Flora (2nd), Trans (3rd), Kalju (4th), Sillamäe Kalev (5th)
  - Although TVMK initially finished 3rd, they were demoted to 10th place at the end of the season due to severe financial difficulties. The team was later disbanded.
- (Latvia) Virslīga – Ventspils (1st), Metalurgs (2nd), Skonto (3rd), Dinaburg (4th), Jūrmala (7th)
  - Daugava Daugavpils (5th) merged with Dinaburg FC, with Dinaburg retaining its name. After FK Rīga (6th) went bankrupt Jūrmala were given the freed spot as the next best placed team.
- (Lithuania) A Lyga – Ekranas (1st), Vėtra (3rd), Sūduva (4th), Šiauliai (7th), Tauras (1st I Lyga), Banga (3rd I Lyga)
  - FBK Kaunas (2nd) and FK Atlantas (6th) withdrew from the top league, citing serious differences with the Lithuanian Football Federation. FK Žalgiris (5th) were denied A Lyga license and were demoted to I Lyga. FK Šilutė (8th) were relegated to I Lyga because of their league position. Eventually two I Lyga sides, Tauras and Banga, were awarded the two remaining spots, as they were both promoted to the A Lyga.

== Play-off Table ==
Round of 16
(Lithuania) Banga | 0 | 1
(Latvia) Ventspils | 0 | 2
(Latvia) Dinaburg | 0 | –
(Lithuania) Vėtra | 0 | –
(Latvia) Jūrmala-VV | 1 | 1
(Lithuania) Ekranas | 3 | 0
(Lithuania) Šiauliai | 1 | 1
(Estonia) Flora | 1 | 3
(Lithuania) Tauras | 1 | 0
(Estonia) Levadia | 0 | 3
(Lithuania) Sūduva | 2 | 1
(Estonia) Trans | 0 | 1
(Estonia) Sillamäe Kalev | 1 | 0
(Latvia) Skonto | 3 | 1
(Estonia) Kalju | 0 | 2
(Latvia) Metalurgs | 1 | 5

Quarter-finals
(Latvia) Ventspils | 2 | 1
(Lithuania) Vėtra | 1 | 0
(Lithuania) Ekranas | 0 | 1
(Estonia) Flora | 0 | 2
(Estonia) Levadia | 0 | 0
(Lithuania) Sūduva | 0 | 1
(Latvia) Skonto | 0 | 0
(Latvia) Metalurgs | 1 | 1

Semi-finals
(Latvia) Ventspils | 2 | 0
(Estonia) Flora | 0 | 0
(Lithuania) Sūduva | 3 | 1
(Latvia) Metalurgs | 0 | 2

Final
(Latvia) Ventspils | 3 (5)
(Lithuania) Sūduva | 3 (3)

== Round of 16 ==
| 22 September 2009 Leg 1 | Dinaburg FC (Latvia) | 0 – 0 | (Lithuania) Vėtra | Daugavpils |
| 16:30 EEST (UTC+03) | | Report | | Stadium: Daugavas stadions Attendance: 100; Referee: (Estonia) Sten Kaldma |

| 28 October 2009 Leg 2 | Vėtra (Lithuania) | Walkover | (Latvia) Dinaburg FC | Vilnius |
| 19:00 EET (UTC+02) | | | | Stadium: Vėtros stadionas |

The second leg match was scratched and Vėtra advanced to the next round as Dinaburg was ejected from the competition for match-fixing.

| 22 September 2009 Leg 1 | Nõmme Kalju (Estonia) | 0 – 1 | (Latvia) SK Liepājas Metalurgs | Tallinn |
| 19:00 EEST (UTC+03) | | Report | 76' Deniss Rakels | Stadium: A. Le Coq Arena; Attendance: 326; Referee: (Lithuania) Audrius Kancleris |

| 28 October 2009 Leg 2 | SK Liepājas Metalurgs (Latvia) | 5 – 2 | (Estonia) Nõmme Kalju | Liepāja |
| 19:00 EET (UTC+02) | Viktors Dobrecovs 5', 42', 60'; Antons Jemeļins 29'; Vladimirs Kamešs 45' | Report | 59' Felipe Nunes; 90+1' Maksim Smirnov | Stadium: Daugavas stadions Attendance: 250; Referee: (Lithuania) Edmundas Gaigalas |

Metalurgs advanced to the next round 6–2 on aggregate.

| 22 September 2009 Leg 1 | Sūduva (Lithuania) | 2 – 0 | (Estonia) Narva Trans | Marijampolė |
| 19:00 EEST (UTC+03) | Andrius Urbšys 50'; Ramūnas Radavičius 72' | Report | | Stadium: Sūduvos stadionas Attendance: 980; Referee: (Latvia) Vadims Direktorenko |

| 28 October 2009 Leg 2 | Narva Trans (Estonia) | 1 – 1 | (Lithuania) Sūduva | Narva |
| 14:00 EET (UTC+02) | Aleksandr Tarassenkov 39' | Report | 54' Ričardas Beniušis | Stadium: Kreenholmi staadion Attendance: 50; Referee: (Latvia) Aleksejs Spasjonņikovs |

Sūduva advanced to the next round 3–1 on aggregate.

| 23 September 2009 Leg 1 | FK Jūrmala (Latvia) | 1 – 3 | (Lithuania) Ekranas | Jūrmala |
| 16:30 EEST (UTC+03) | Jurģis Kalns 35' | Report | 66' Egidijus Varnas; 77', 90' Dominykas Galkevičius | Stadium: Slokas stadions Attendance: 80; Referee: (Estonia) Hannes Kaasik |

| 27 October 2009 Leg 2 | Ekranas (Lithuania) | 0 – 1 | (Latvia) FK Jūrmala | Panevėžys |
| 19:00 EET (UTC+02) | | Report | 73' Gatis Kalniņš | Stadium: Aukštaitija stadionas Attendance: 550; Referee: (Estonia) Eiko Saar |

Ekranas advanced to the next round 3–2 on aggregate.

| 23 September 2009 Leg 1 | Tauras (Lithuania) | 1 – 0 | (Estonia) Levadia | Tauragė |
| 16:30 EEST (UTC+03) | Vytautas Dragūnevičius 1' | Report | | Stadium: Vytauto stadionas Attendance: 700; Referee: (Estonia) Kristo Tohver |

| 27 October 2009 Leg 2 | Levadia (Estonia) | 3 – 0 | (Lithuania) Tauras | Tallinn |
| 14:00 EET (UTC+02) | Deniss Malov 26'; Vitali Leitan 39'; Konstantin Nahk 69' (pen.) | Report | | Stadium: Maarjamäe staadion Attendance: 200; Referee: (Latvia) Andrejs Sipailo |

Levadia advanced to the next round 3–1 on aggregate.

| 23 September 2009 Leg 1 | Sillamäe Kalev (Estonia) | 1 – 3 | (Latvia) Skonto FC | Sillamäe |
| 16:30 EEST (UTC+03) | Aleksey Naumov 40' | Report | 23' Andrei Agafonov; 59' Nathan Júnior; 83' Aleksandrs Cauņa | Stadium: Kalevi staadion Attendance: 260; Referee: (Lithuania) Paulius Malžinskas |

| 28 October 2009 Leg 2 | Skonto FC (Latvia) | 1 – 0 | (Estonia) Sillamäe Kalev | Riga |
| 19:00 EET (UTC+02) | Aleksandrs Fertovs 75' | Report | | Stadium: Skonto stadions Attendance: 60; Referee: (Lithuania) Sergejus Slyva |

Skonto advanced to the next round 4–1 on aggregate.

| 23 September 2009 Leg 1 | Šiauliai (Lithuania) | 1 – 1 | (Estonia) Flora | Šiauliai |
| 19:00 EEST (UTC+03) | Tadas Špukas 6' | Report | 83' Vjatšeslav Zahovaiko | Stadium: Savivaldybė stadionas Attendance: 2400; Referee: (Latvia) Andris Treimanis |

| 27 October 2009 Leg 2 | Flora (Estonia) | 3 – 1 (a.e.t) | (Lithuania) Šiauliai | Tallinn |
| 19:00 EET (UTC+02) | Vjatšeslav Zahovaiko 78', 93', 117' | Report | 9' Mantas Kuklys | Stadium: A. Le Coq Arena; Attendance: 120; Referee: (Latvia) Sergejs Braga |

Flora advanced to the next round 4–2 on aggregate.

| 8 October 2009 Leg 1 | Banga (Lithuania) | 0 – 0 | (Latvia) Ventspils | Klaipėda |
| 14:00 EEST (UTC+03) | | Report | | Stadium: Miesto stadions Attendance: 250; Referee: (Estonia) Kristo Tohver |

| 10 November 2009 Leg 2 | Ventspils (Latvia) | 2 – 1 | (Lithuania) Banga | Ventspils |
| 14:00 EET (UTC+02) | Aleksandrs Solovjovs 59'; João Martins 86' | Report | 79' Israel Awenayeri Douglas | Stadium: Olimpiskais stadions Attendance: 1500; Referee: (Estonia) Aivar Israel |

Ventspils advanced to the next round 2–1 on aggregate.

== Quarter-finals ==
| 6 April 2010 Leg 1 | Vėtra (Lithuania) | 1 – 2 | (Latvia) Ventspils | Vilnius |
| 19:00 EEST (UTC+03) | Artūras Žulpa 48' | Report | 25' Ivan Shpakov; 68' Sergey Shumilin | Stadium: Sportima indoor hall Referee: (Estonia) Hannes Kaasik |

| 5 May 2010 Leg 2 | Ventspils (Latvia) | 1 – 0 | (Lithuania) Vėtra | Ventspils |
| 17:30 EEST (UTC+03) | Sergey Shumilin 42' | Report | | Stadium: Olimpiskais Stadions; Attendance: 300; Referee: (Estonia) Kristo Tohver |

Ventspils advanced to the next round 3–1 on aggregate.

| 6 April 2010 Leg 1 | Flora (Estonia) | 0 – 0 | (Lithuania) Ekranas | Tallinn |
| 19:00 EEST (UTC+03) | | Report | | Stadium: Sportland Arena; Attendance: 88; Referee: (Latvia) Vadims Direktorenko |

| 5 May 2010 Leg 2 | Ekranas (Lithuania) | 1 – 2 | (Estonia) Flora | Panevėžys |
| 19:00 EEST (UTC+03) | Vīts Rimkus 51' | Report | 62' Alo Dupikov; 77' (pen.) Valeri Minkenen | Stadium: Aukštaitija Stadium; Attendance: 650; Referee: (Latvia) Aleksandrs Anufrijevs |

Flora advanced to the next round 2–1 on aggregate.

| 7 April 2010 Leg 1 | Sūduva (Lithuania) | 0 – 0 | (Estonia) Levadia | Marijampolė |
| 19:00 EEST (UTC+03) | | Report | | Stadium: Sūduvos stadionas Attendance: 800; Referee: (Latvia) Vadims Cernikovs |

| 4 May 2010 Leg 2 | Levadia (Estonia) | 0 – 1 | (Lithuania) Sūduva | Tallinn |
| 17:30 EEST (UTC+03) | | Report | 36' Povilas Lukšys | Stadium: A. Le Coq Arena 1st grass pitch Referee: (Latvia) Aleksandr Golubevs |

Sūduva advanced to the next round 1–0 on aggregate.

| 7 April 2010 Leg 1 | SK Liepājas Metalurgs (Latvia) | 1 – 0 | (Latvia) Skonto FC | Liepāja |
| 19:00 EEST (UTC+03) | Oskars Kļava 58' | Report | | Stadium: Daugavas stadions Attendance: 500; Referee: (Lithuania) Nerijus Dunauskas |

| 4 May 2010 Leg 2 | Skonto FC (Latvia) | 0 – 1 | (Latvia) SK Liepājas Metalurgs | Riga |
| 19:00 EEST (UTC+03) | | Report | Vitalijus Kavaliauskas 24' | Stadium: Skonto Stadions; Referee: (Lithuania) Audrius Žuta |

Metalurgs advanced to the next round 2–0 on aggregate.

== Semi-finals ==
| 26 May 2010 Leg 1 | Ventspils (Latvia) | 2 – 0 | (Estonia) Flora | Ventspils |
| 17:00 EEST (UTC+03) | Aleksejs Višņakovs 17'; Eduards Višņakovs 72' | Report | | Stadium: Ventspils Olimpiskais Stadions; Attendance: 300; Referee: (Lithuania) Gediminas Mažeika |

| 8 June 2010 Leg 2 | Flora (Estonia) | 0 – 0 | (Latvia) Ventspils | Tallinn |
| 19:00 EEST (UTC+03) | | Report | | Stadium: A. Le Coq Arena; Attendance: 780; Referee: (Lithuania) Audrius Žuta |

Ventspils advanced to the next round 2–0 on aggregate.

| 26 May 2010 Leg 1 | Sūduva (Lithuania) | 3 – 0 | (Latvia) SK Liepājas Metalurgs | Marijampolė |
| 19:00 EEST (UTC+03) | Nerijus Radžius 36'; Karolis Chvedukas 42'; Povilas Lukšys 80' | Report | | Stadium: Sūduva Stadium; Referee: (Estonia) Eiko Saar |

| 9 June 2010 Leg 2 | SK Liepājas Metalurgs (Latvia) | 2 – 1 | (Lithuania) Sūduva | Liepāja |
| 19:00 EEST (UTC+03) | Oskars Kļava 16'; Genādijs Soloņicins 90' | Report | 80' Povilas Lukšys | Stadium: Daugava Stadium; Referee: (Estonia) Hannes Kaasik |

Sūduva advanced to the next round 4–2 on aggregate.

== Final ==
| 4 July 2010 Final | Sūduva (Lithuania) | 3 – 3 (a.e.t.) (3 – 5 p) | (Latvia) Ventspils | Marijampolė |
| 17:00 EEST (UTC+03) | Ričardas Beniušis 90+3', 114'; Andrius Urbšys 120+1' | Report | 82' Alexandru Dedov; 99' (pen.) Jurijs Žigajevs; 105' Michael Tukura | Stadium: Sūduva Stadium; Attendance: 3,000; Referee: (Estonia) Sten Kaldma |
| | Penalties |
| | Esau Garcia Alvarez (penalty scored); Sandro Grande (penalty scored); Ričardas Beniušis (penalty scored); Andrius Urbšys (penalty missed) | | (penalty scored) Jurijs Žigajevs; (penalty scored) Ivan Shpakov; (penalty scored) Alexandru Dedov; (penalty scored) Michael Tukura; (penalty scored) Grigori Chirkin |

== Goalscorers ==
As of 4 July 2010.

4 goals:

- (Estonia) Vjatšeslav Zahovaiko

3 goals:

- (Latvia) Viktors Dobrecovs
- (Lithuania) Povilas Lukšys
- (Lithuania) Ričardas Beniušis

2 goals:

- (Lithuania) Andrius Urbšys
- (Lithuania) Dominykas Galkevičius
- (Latvia) Oskars Kļava
- (Russia) Sergey Shumilin

1 goal:

- (Russia) Andrey Agafonov
- (Latvia) Aleksandrs Cauņa
- (Lithuania) Karolis Chvedukas
- (Moldova) Alexandru Dedov
- (Nigeria) Israel Awenayeri Douglas
- (Lithuania) Vytautas Dragūnevičius
- (Estonia) Alo Dupikov
- (Latvia) Aleksandrs Fertovs
- (Latvia) Antons Jemeļins
- (Brazil) Nathan Júnior
- (Latvia) Gatis Kalniņš
- (Latvia) Jurģis Kalns
- (Latvia) Vladimirs Kamešs
- (Lithuania) Vitalijus Kavaliauskas
- (Lithuania) Mantas Kuklys
- (Estonia) Vitali Leitan
- (Estonia) Deniss Malov
- (Portugal) João Martins
- (Finland) Valeri Minkenen
- (Estonia) Konstantin Nahk
- (Russia) Aleksey Naumov
- (Brazil) Felipe Nunes
- (Lithuania) Ramūnas Radavičius
- (Lithuania) Nerijus Radžius
- (Latvia) Deniss Rakels
- (Latvia) Vīts Rimkus
- (Russia) Ivan Shpakov
- (Estonia) Maksim Smirnov
- (Latvia) Genādijs Soloņicins
- (Latvia) Aleksandrs Solovjovs
- (Lithuania) Tadas Špukas
- (Estonia) Aleksandr Tarassenkov
- (Nigeria) Michael Tukura
- (Lithuania) Egidijus Varnas
- (Latvia) Aleksejs Višņakovs
- (Latvia) Eduards Višņakovs
- (Latvia) Jurijs Žigajevs
- (Lithuania) Artūras Žulpa
