= Ritvars =

Male given name

- Gender: Male
- Name day: 14 July

Origin
- Region of origin: Latvia

Ritvars is a Latvian masculine given name and may refer to:

- Ritvars Gulbis (born 1980), Latvian curler and curling coach
- Ritvars Rugins (born 1989), Latvian footballer
- Ritvars Suharevs (born 1999), Latvian weightlifter
