= 2006 Latvian First League =

Latvian football league season for 2nd division

These are the statistics of the Latvian First League during the 2006 season.

== Overview ==
16 teams participated in the league, and JFK Olimps Rīga won the championship.

== League standings ==
Pos	Team	Pld	W	D	L	GF	GA	GD	Pts	Promotion or relegation
1	JFK Olimps Rīga	30	26	2	2	111	15	+96	80	1. liga Winners
2	FC Ditton-2 Daugavpils	30	21	7	2	88	24	+64	70	
3	Skonto-2 Riga	30	20	5	5	78	23	+55	65	
4	Ventspils-2	30	20	4	6	108	25	+83	64	
5	Rīga-2	30	17	3	10	74	44	+30	54	
6	Dinaburg-Zemessardze Daugavpils	36	16	3	17	60	51	+9	51	
7	FK Valmiera	30	13	7	10	50	53	−3	46	
8	Liepajas Metalurgs-2	30	13	6	11	68	47	+21	45	
9	FK Jelgava	30	12	6	12	53	49	+4	42	
10	Eirobaltija Riga	30	11	7	12	50	40	+10	40	
11	Jūrmala-2	30	10	5	15	86	74	+12	35	
12	Tranzīts Ventspils	30	8	4	18	37	88	−51	28	
13	Multibanka Riga	30	7	6	17	34	58	−24	27	
14	FK Auda Kekava	30	5	2	23	28	79	−51	17	
15	Alberts Riga	30	4	4	22	32	114	−82	16	
16	Abuls Smiltene	30	1	1	28	18	191	−173	4	Relegated to lower division at the end of season

== Top scorers ==
- (Latvia) Ivans Lukjanovs (Olimps) - 27 goals
