= Astratijs Roškovs =

Lithuanian-Russian-Latvian footballer

Astratijs Roškovs (born 1939) is a former Lithuanian-Russian-Latvian football central defender who, from 1960 to 1970, played for FK Daugava Rīga.

== Biography ==
Roškovs came from a very religious family. For the first time Roškovs played football at the age of 14 when his family moved from the countryside to Vilnius. He was very assiduous in training and skipped school very often because of football, however he didn't get much chance to play, not even in goal. Once when Astratijs had run away from church to see Spartak Vilnius play, his father hit him with a stick. Later Astratijs was allowed to play football only if his marks at school were good.

In 1959 he played three matches for Baltika Kaliningrad in the second Soviet league. When his father got transferred to work in construction in Riga, Latvia, Astratijs became a footballer with the local Daugava Rīga. Roškovs was never considered an exceptionally talented player however he was very disciplined and trained hard to be kept on the team and in late 1960s he played for Daugava in nearly all matches.

After retiring from playing Roškovs studied coaching in Moscow. He managed Celtnieks Rīga, FK Jūrnieks and the ladies team of Spartak Moscow. As of January 2008 Roškovs still works with young footballers. He managed youth football club RTU – Rigas stars. He works with footballers who were born in 1995.
