= Artis Lazdiņš =

Latvian footballer (born 1986)

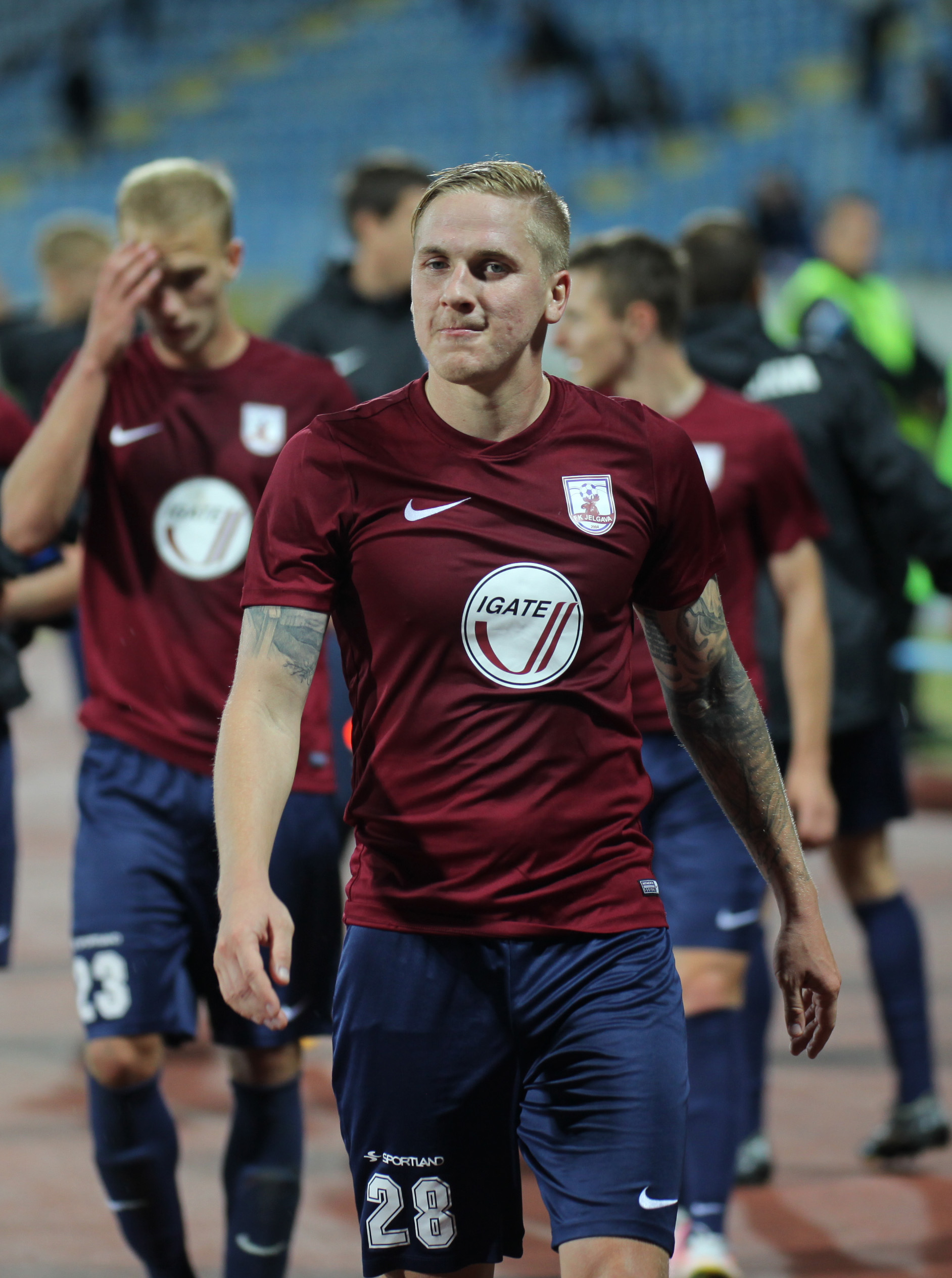
- Lazdiņš with Jelgava in 2016

Personal information
- Date of birth: 3 May 1986 (age 40)
- Place of birth: Limbaži, Latvian SSR, Soviet Union (now Republic of Latvia)
- Height: 1.81 m (5 ft 11 in)
- Position: Midfielder

Youth career
- 1994–1997: FK Limbaži
- 1997–2000: FK Auda
- 2000–2004: Chernomorets-USA
- 2004–2005: Auda

Senior career*
Years	Team	Apps	(Gls)
2006–2009	Ventspils	41	(1)
2010–2012	Jelgava	65	(2)
2012–2013	Piast Gliwice	29	(1)
2014–2019	Jelgava	85	(2)
2020–2022	Saldus SS/Leevon		
2022–2023	Greifswalder FC	31	(0)

International career
2004–2005	Latvia U19	5	(0)
2006–2007	Latvia U21	10	(0)
2010–2017	Latvia	29	(0)
- * Club domestic league appearances and goals

Artis Lazdiņš (born 3 May 1986) is a Latvian former professional footballer who played as a midfielder.

== Club career ==
=== Early career ===
Artis Lazdiņš started playing football in his early childhood being taken to trainings to his local team FK Limbaži (coach: Valdis Matīss) by his father. In 2000 his family decided to move to the USA. He then continued playing football in an American-Ukrainian football (soccer) academy Chornomorets-USA in NYC. In 2004, after graduating from the Julia Richman High School, he returned to Latvia and played for Auda in Riga until the end of 2005.

=== Ventspils ===
In 2006 Lazdiņš was signed by Ventspils. In his first season in Ventspils Lazdiņš played for the reserve team and did not take part in the first-team action. In 2007 Lazdiņš had three appearances, not finding the net. In the next two years the number of appearances grew to 12 and 18, respectively. Lazdiņš became the champion of Latvia with FK Ventspils three times in a row - from 2006 to 2008. He also participated in the UEFA Europa League group stages in 2009. However, in 2009 the team's managers changed and Lazdiņš was no more needed within the squad, with his contract being terminated by a mutual agreement.

=== Jelgava ===
After leaving Ventspils Lazdiņš started looking for a club abroad but was then handed an offer by the Latvian Virsliga newcomers Jelgava. He signed a contract for one season and soon after joining became a first eleven player. In his first season there he played 24 matches and also managed to win the Latvian Cup. In January 2011 Lazdiņš extended his contract with FK Jelgava for another season. In August 2011 he went on trial with the Danish team Randers but did not stay with them, returning to Jelgava. All in all, Lazdiņš played 24 matches, scoring two goals in the 2011 season. The 2012 season started badly for Jelgava and having played 15 matches, Lazdiņš used the release clause of his contract in July 2012.

=== Piast Gliwice ===
In August 2012 Lazdiņš went on trial with the Polish Ekstraklasa club Piast Gliwice and signed a contract with them in September 2012. He scored his first goal for the club on 30 March 2013 in a 1–1 league match draw against Jagiellonia Białystok. The 2012-13 season, which was the debut season for Piast since the return to the Ekstraklasa, saw the club finish the league in the 4th position of the table, qualifying for the UEFA Europa League for the first time in the club's history. Lazdiņš participated in the second leg of the second qualifying round, when Piast played a 2–2 draw against the Azerbaijani club Qarabağ. In his second season with Piast Lazdiņš gradually lost his place in the starting line-up, playing just seven league and two cup matches for the club.

=== Return to Jelgava ===
On 26 March 2014, the return of Lazdiņš was officially confirmed by his former club Jelgava. Despite suffering from a long-term injury in the second half of the season, Lazdiņš participated in 18 league matches as well as the UEFA Europa League qualifiers, ceding to the Norwegian side Rosenborg over two legs in the first qualifying round of the tournament. He helped Jelgava win the Latvian Cup and reach bronze medals in the domestic championship for the first time in the club's history.

=== Saldus SS/Leevon ===
On 19 March 2020, Lazdiņš joined Latvian club Saldus SS/Leevon.

=== Greifswalder FC ===
In February 2022, Lazdiņš moved to German club Greifswalder FC of the fifth-tier NOFV-Oberliga Nord. At the end of the 2022–23 season he left the club and retired from playing.

== International career ==
Lazdiņš was a member of Latvia U-19 and Latvia U-21 football teams, being called up to the senior side for the Baltic Cup matches in 2010. He made his international debut in the second match of the tournament against Estonia on 19 June 2010. He then came on as a substitute, replacing Juris Laizāns. In 2012 Lazdiņš helped Latvia win the Baltic Cup, beating Finland in the final. Latvia won the Baltic Cup for the second time in a row in May 2014, beating Lithuania in the final. As of March 2015, Lazdiņš had played 21 matches for Latvia.

== Personal life ==
According to fkjelgava.lv, Lazdiņš loves cinema and also has a Twitter account. His native language is Latvian, but he also speaks English fluently, Russian well and German at a basic level. His aim in football is to improve and reach career heights.

== Honours ==
Ventspils

- Latvian Higher League: 2006, 2007, 2008
- Latvian Cup: 2007
- Baltic League: 2009–10

Jelgava

- Latvian Cup: 2009–10, 2013–14, 2014–15, 2015–16

Latvia

- Baltic Cup: 2012, 2014
