= Igor Byrlov =

Russian professional footballer

Personal information
- Full name: Igor Aleksandrovich Byrlov
- Date of birth: 10 July 1986 (age 40)
- Place of birth: Apsheronsk, Krasnodar Region, USSR
- Height: 1.77 m (5 ft 10 in)
- Positions: Forward; midfielder

Youth career
- FC Torpedo Moscow

Senior career*
| Years | Team | Apps | (Gls) |
| 2002–2006 | FC Torpedo Moscow | 8 | (0) |
| 2007 | FC Chernomorets Novorossiysk | 12 | (0) |
| 2008 | FC Rusichi Oryol | 29 | (5) |
| 2009 | FC Chernomorets Novorossiysk | 6 | (0) |
| 2009 | → FC Tyumen (loan) | 13 | (3) |
| 2010–2011 | FC SKA-Energiya Khabarovsk | 45 | (2) |
| 2012 | FK Jūrmala | 6 | (0) |
| 2012–2013 | FC Chernomorets Novorossiysk | 21 | (4) |
| 2013–2014 | FC Dynamo Bryansk | 34 | (2) |
| 2015 | FC Afips Afipsky | 5 | (0) |
| 2015 | FC Volga Ulyanovsk | 15 | (1) |
| 2016 | FC Dynamo Stavropol | 6 | (0) |
| 2016–2017 | FC Volga Tver | 11 | (2) |
| 2017 | FC Druzhba Maykop | 14 | (0) |
- * Club domestic league appearances and goals

Igor Aleksandrovich Byrlov (Russian: Игорь Александрович Бырлов; born 10 July 1986) is a Russian former professional footballer.

== Club career ==
He made his debut in the Russian Premier League in 2005 for FC Torpedo Moscow.
