= Vitālijs Meļņičenko =

Latvian footballer (born 1987)

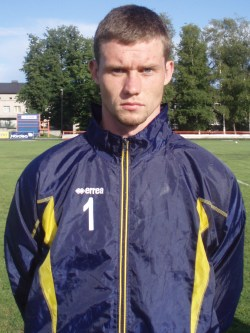
- Meļņičenko in training with SK Blāzma

Personal information
- Full name: Vitālijs Meļņičenko
- Date of birth: 11 November 1987 (age 39)
- Place of birth: Riga, Latvian SSR, Soviet Union (now Republic of Latvia)
- Height: 1.91 m (6 ft 3 in)
- Position: Goalkeeper

Team information
- Current team: Os TF

Youth career
- Rīgas Futbola skola

Senior career*
| Years | Team | Apps | (Gls) |
| 2005 | JFK Olimps | 1 | (0) |
| 2006 | Eirobaltija | 15 | (0) |
| 2007 | Rīga | 0 | (0) |
| 2008–2010 | Skonto | 2 | (0) |
| 2008 | → Olimps/RFS (loan) | 7 | (1) |
| 2009 | → Blāzma (loan) | 10 | (0) |
| 2010 | → Olimps/RFS (loan) | 3 | (0) |
| 2010 | → Blāzma (loan) | 14 | (0) |
| 2011 | Szolnoki MÁV | 13 | (0) |
| 2012–2013 | Ventspils | 20 | (0) |
| 2014 | Spartaks Jūrmala | 23 | (0) |
| 2015 | Ventspils | 25 | (0) |
| 2016–2017 | Fakel Voronezh | 13 | (0) |
| 2017 | Spartaks Jūrmala | 5 | (0) |
| 2018 | Ventspils | 19 | (0) |
| 2019 | Spartaks Jūrmala | 18 | (0) |
| 2020–2025 | Lysekloster IL | 85 | (0) |
| 2025– | Os TF | 0 | (0) |
- * Club domestic league appearances and goals as of 26 January 2026

Vitālijs Meļņičenko (born 11 November 1987 in Riga) is a Latvian footballer who plays for Os TF.

== Club career ==
As a youth player Meļņičenko played for Rīgas Futbola skola, making his first professional appearance in 2005 for Olimps/RFS. In 2006, he joined FK Eirobaltija, but in 2007 he returned to the higher-level football, joining FK Rīga. Unable to prove himself there he was signed by Skonto Riga in 2008. He made 2 appearances for the club, being loaned to Olimps/RFS in 2008 and SK Blāzma in 2009. While playing for Olimps/RFS, Meļņičenko managed to score a goal against FK Vindava and all in all played 7 league games. During the loan spell at SK Blāzma he played 10 league matches. In 2010 Meļņičenko was given out on loan to Olimps/RFS yet again. Having played 3 matches for the club, Meļņičenko left for SK Blāzma once again in 2010.

At the start of 2011 Meļņičenko went on trial with the Nemzeti Bajnokság I club Zalaegerszegi TE in Hungary. The player did not stay in Zalaegerszeg, but eventually signed a contract with a different Hungarian club - the league newcomers Szolnoki MÁV in February 2011. In July 2011 he was released, having made 13 appearances in the top tier of Hungarian football. Meļņičenko remained unemployed until February 2012, when he was signed by that time Latvian champions FK Ventspils. Starting the season as the first-choice keeper, Meļņičenko appeared in 15 league matches, but was later replaced by Maksims Uvarenko. Meļņičenko played for Ventspils until the end of the 2013 season, mainly being used as the backup keeper.

In March 2014 Meļņičenko joined the Latvian Higher League club Spartaks Jūrmala. He played 23 league matches, keeping 11 clean sheets throughout the season. In January 2015 Meļņičenko was signed by his previous club FK Ventspils as a replacement for Uvarenko who had moved to CSKA Sofia.

In March 2020, Meļņičenko was signed by Norwegian club Lysekloster IL. However, he wasn't presented before June 2020. As of February 2022, he was still playing for the Norwegian club.

== Honours ==
=== Skonto FC ===
- Latvian Higher League - BRONZE
  - 2009

=== FK Ventspils ===
- Latvian Higher League - BRONZE
  - 2012, 2015
- Latvian Higher League - CHAMPION
  - 2013
- Latvian Cup - WINNER
  - 2012–13
- Latvian Cup - FINALIST
  - 2014–15, 2018
- Latvian Higher League - SILVER
  - 2018

=== FK Spartaks ===
- Latvian Higher League - CHAMPION
  - 2017

=== FC Fakel ===
- League Cup - WINNER
  - 2017
