= Igors Semjonovs =

Latvian footballer

Personal information
- Full name: Igors Semjonovs
- Date of birth: 3 July 1985 (age 41)
- Place of birth: Riga, Soviet Union (now Republic of Latvia)
- Height: 1.76 m (5 ft 9 1/2 in)
- Position: Midfielder

Team information
- Current team: FB Gulbene
- Number: 15

Youth career
- JFC Skonto

Senior career*
| Years | Team | Apps | (Gls) |
| 2002–2009 | Skonto Riga | 127 | (11) |
| 2010–2012 | FK Jūrmala | 27 | (6) |
| 2012 | Daugava Riga | 0 | (0) |
| 2012 | FK Rīgas Futbola skola | 10 | (9) |
| 2013– | FB Gulbene | 12 | (0) |

International career^{‡}
| 2003–2004 | Latvia | 10 | (0) |
- * Club domestic league appearances and goals as of 2 July 2013 ‡ National team caps and goals as of 2 July 2013

Igors Semjonovs (born 3 July 1985) is a Latvian football midfielder, currently playing for the Latvian First League club FB Gulbene.

Semjonovs has appeared for the Latvia national football team.
