= FK Eirobaltija =

Latvian football club

Futbola klubs Eirobaltija was a football club based in Riga, Latvia. It became defunct in 2006.

== History ==
The club won the Second League in 2004, earning promotion to the First League. They merged with FK Riga-2 for the 2005 season, but became an independent club for the 2006 season. That season they finishing tenth in the division and reached the fourth round of the Latvian Football Cup, losing 2–0 to FK Riga. They merged into FK Riga at the end of the season.
