= Ryota Ishikawa =

Japanese footballer (born 1988)

Personal information
- Date of birth: 11 February 1988 (age 38)
- Place of birth: Osaka, Japan
- Height: 1.67 m (5 ft 5 1/2 in)
- Position: Midfielder

Youth career
- 2003–2005: Hatsushiba Hashimoto High School

College career
Years	Team	Apps	(Gls)
2006–2009	Nara Gakuen University		

Senior career*
Years	Team	Apps	(Gls)
2010–2011	Suzuka Rampole	13	(0)
2011	Fukushima United		
2011–2012	Osaka	13	(0)
2012	Gulbene	28	(2)
2013	Ain Foods		
2014–2015	Lanexang United		
2016	Internazionale Pattaya		
2017	Stallion Laguna		
2017	Erchim		
2018	Svay Rieng		
- * Club domestic league appearances and goals as of 11 April 2020

Ryota Ishikawa (石川 龍太, Ishikawa Ryota; born 11 February 1988) is a Japanese former footballer who played as a midfielder.

== Career ==
Ishikawa formerly played for Philippines Football League side Stallion Laguna.

== Career statistics ==
=== Club ===
As of 7 January 2019.

Club	Season	League			Cup		Continental		Other		Total	
Club	Season	Division	Apps	Goals	Apps	Goals	Apps	Goals	Apps	Goals	Apps	Goals
Suzuka Rampole	2010	Tōkai Adult Soccer League	13	0	0	0	–		0	0	13	0
Osaka	2011	Osaka Prefectural League	13	0	0	0	–		0	0	13	0
Gulbene	2012	Latvian Higher League	28	2	2 (Note: Appearances in the Latvian Cup)	0	–		0	0	30	2
Career total			28	2	2	0	0	0	0	0	30	2
