= Andrejs Butriks =

Latvian footballer and director

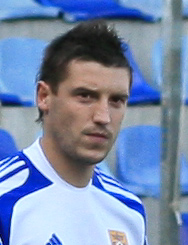
- Butriks playing for FK Ventspils

Personal information
- Full name: Andrejs Butriks
- Date of birth: 20 December 1982 (age 43)
- Place of birth: Riga, Latvia, USSR (now Republic of Latvia)
- Height: 1.77 m (5 ft 9 1/2 in)
- Position: Forward

Team information
- Current team: FK Ventspils (sporting director)

Youth career
- FK Avots

Senior career*
Years	Team	Apps	(Gls)
2001–2011	FK Ventspils	212	(56)
2010	→ FC Ceahlăul (loan)	0	(0)
2011	FK Jūrmala-VV	9	(2)
2011–2012	Anagennisi Epanomi	1	(0)

International career^{‡}
2007–2012	Latvia	4	(0)
- * Club domestic league appearances and goals as of 28 June 2012 (UTC) ‡ National team caps and goals as of 28 June 2012

Andrejs Butriks (born 20 December 1982 in Riga) is a former Latvian football forward, currently the sporting director of FK Ventspils in the Latvian Higher League.

== Club career ==
Butriks played for FK Avots at youth level before signing for FK Ventspils in 2001. In 2002, he scored 14 goals in 24 games for the club, becoming a vital first eleven player in the next few years. Butriks played for FK Ventspils, until 2011, scoring more than 50 goals in 212 matches. While playing for Ventspils, in January 2008 Butriks had a trial period with Football League Championship club Blackpool in England, but didn't stay with the club. Seeking a new club abroad after UEFA Europa League matches he joined FC Ceahlăul Piatra Neamţ in Romania on loan from FK Ventspils in February 2010. As this was a very unsuccessful period, Butriks didn't play even a match for the club and returned to Ventspils in June 2010. This being away period in Romania had left Butriks out of the team's starting eleven and he found it difficult to fit into the squad, mostly being a late game substitute. Unhappy with that time situation Andrejs left the club in April 2011, signing a contract with another Virsliga club FK Jūrmala-VV. Due to the club's unstable financial situation and poor results Butriks played only 9 league matches and managed to score twice. In July 2011 he left the team, signing a contract abroad in August 2011. This time a one-year contract in Greece with the newly promoted Anagennisi Epanomi, playing in the Greek Second League. Andrejs got himself injured against PAOK, playing just one league game and being released after the season. Following his release Butriks decided to retire from football.

In June 2012 he accepted an offer to become the sporting director of his former club FK Ventspils.

== International career ==
In October 2007 Butriks was called up to the Latvia squad for their UEFA Euro 2008 qualifying Group F match against Iceland on 13 October, but he did not play in the match. He made his debut for Latvia on 17 October in their Euro 2008 qualifying match against Denmark, when he came on as a substitute in the 63rd minute. All in all, he collected 4 international appearances for Latvia.

== Honours ==
=== Team ===
FK Ventspils

- Virsliga Champion (3): 2006, 2007, 2008
- Latvian Cup winner (4): 2003, 2004, 2005, 2007

== Personal life ==
Butriks is married and has a son. His wife's name is Jūlija, while the son's name is Artjoms.
