= Nunzio Zavettieri =

Italian football manager

Personal information
- Full name: Annunziato Zavettieri
- Date of birth: 19 April 1967 (age 59)
- Place of birth: Castrovillari, Italy

Managerial career
- Years: Team
- 1990–1992: A.C. Milan (youth)
- 1992–2000: Udinese (youth)
- 2000–2009: Inter Milan (youth)
- 2009–2010: FK Ventspils
- 2013–2014: FC Bari (assistant)
- 2014–2015: L'Aquila
- 2015–2016: Juve Stabia
- 2016–2017: Catanzaro
- 2017–2018: Bisceglie
- 2018: Virtus Francavilla
- 2019–2020: Spartaks Jūrmala
- 2022–2023: Nocerina

Annunziato "Nunzio" Zavettieri (born 19 April 1967) is an Italian football manager, last in charge as head coach of Serie D club Nocerina.

== Biography ==
He has coached at youth level at top Italian clubs A.C. Milan, Udinese and Inter Milan. On 11 August 2009 it was announced he had signed a two-year contract with Latvian Higher League side FK Ventspils, who under his leadership played in the UEFA Champions League and the UEFA Europa League after being crowned the champions of Latvia.

He was successively named as new assistant coach to Roberto Alberti for the 2013–14 season at Bari.

He also holds a UEFA Pro Licence.

On 13 May 2022, Zavettieri was hired as the technical director of Serie D club Nocerina, with Giuseppe Sannino as the new head coach. Later in October 2022, following the resignations of Sannino from his position, Zavettieri moved back into coaching and directly took charge of the Nocerina first team with immediate effect. He resigned on 30 January 2023, following a string of three consecutive league defeats.

== Honours ==
FK Ventspils

- Baltic League: 2009–10
