= Saša Cilinšek =

Serbian footballer

Personal information
- Full name: Saša Cilinšek
- Date of birth: 28 January 1982 (age 44)
- Place of birth: Vrdnik, SFR Yugoslavia
- Height: 1.84 m (6 ft 0 in)
- Position: Defender

Youth career
- 1989–1995: Rudar Vrdnik
- 1995–1998: Vojvodina

Senior career*
Years	Team	Apps	(Gls)
1998–2005	Vojvodina	113	(8)
2005	Dyskobolia Grodzisk	5	(0)
2005–2007	Tavriya Simferopol	10	(0)
2007–2009	Ventspils	43	(2)
2009–2010	Jagodina	25	(3)
2010–2012	Thonon Évian	2	(0)
2014	Red Star Belgrade	0	(0)
2014–2015	Urania Genève Sport	5	(0)
2015	FC Lancy	6	(0)
2016	Urania Genève Sport	1	(0)

International career
	FR Yugoslavia U21	4	(0)
- * Club domestic league appearances and goals

Saša Cilinšek (Serbian Cyrillic: Саша Цилиншек; born 28 January 1982) is a Serbian retired footballer who played as a defender.

== Club career ==
Born in Vrdnik (SR Serbia, SFR Yugoslavia), he is the older brother Zoran Cilinšek. Cilinšek started his career in local FK Rudar Vrdnik where he played between 1989 and 1995 when he moved to the youth team of FK Vojvodina. In 1998, he became senior and he made his debut in the First League of FR Yugoslavia.

== International career ==
At national team level, he played for all youth selection including FR Yugoslavia U21.
