= 2009–10 Latvian Football Cup =

Football competition held in Latvia

The Latvian Football Cup 2009–10 was the 68th edition of the Latvian football knockout tournament. The season switched from calendar year to fall/spring season.

Jelgava, qualified for the second qualifying round of the UEFA Europa League 2010–11.

== First round ==
October 17, 2009
FK Staiceles Bebri	4–4	SK Upesciems	aet, p. 1–3
FK Madona/Kvarcs	3–0	FK Pļaviņas DM
FK Balvu Vilki/Mārupe	1–0	FK Priekuļi
RFS Flaminko	10–0	JFC Dobele/Spartak
FK Tukuma brāļi	3–3	COLDGEL/Varavīksne	aet, p. 3–5
October 18, 2009
FK Olaine	0–1	FK Jelgava/BJSS
FK Ozolnieki	1–1	FK Viesulis	aet, p. 5–3
FK Valka	5–1	FK Alberts
FK Ādaži/SVPDD	3–2	FB Gulbene 2005	aet
Bauskas rajona BJSS	4–1	FK Elvi	aet

== Second round ==
October 24, 2009
FK Madona/Kvarcs	0–4	FS Metta-LU Rīga
FK Balvu Vilki/Mārupe	2–3	SK Upesciems	aet
FK Valka	0–0	FK Auda	aet, p. 4–2
RFS Flaminko	0–1	COLDGEL/Varavīksne
FK Ozolnieki	0–6	FK Jelgava
Bauskas rajona BJSS	0–2	FC Jūrmala
October 25, 2009
FK Jelgava/BJSS	1–8	FK Kauguri/PBLC
FK Ādaži/SVPDD	1–4	FC Daugava

== Third round ==
April 2, 2010
FC Jūrmala	0–4	FK Ventspils
FC Daugava	1–4	SK Liepājas Metalurgs
April 3, 2010
FK Kauguri/PBLC	walkover	Skonto FC	FK Kauguri/PBLC retired from competition
FK Jelgava	2–1	FC Tranzīts	aet
FS Metta/LU	1–3	FK Daugava/RFS
April 4, 2010
COLDGEL/Varavīksne	0–2	JFK Olimps/RFS
SK Upesciems	0–5	SK Blāzma
FK Valka	0–13	FK Jūrmala-VV

== Quarterfinals ==
The eight winners from the previous round compete in this round. These matches took place on 14 April 2010.

Team 1	Score	Team 2
FK Jūrmala-VV	4–0	SK Blāzma
FK Daugava/RFS	0–4	JFK Olimps/RFS
FK Ventspils	0–0 (aet) (p) 6–7	Skonto FC
SK Liepājas Metalurgs	1–1 (aet) (p) 6–7	FK Jelgava

== Semifinals ==
The four winners from the previous round compete in this round. These matches took place on 28 April 2010.

Team 1	Score	Team 2
Skonto Riga	1–1 (aet) (p) 3–4	Jelgava
RFS/Olimps	1–3	Jūrmala

== Final ==
19 May 2010
18:40 CEST

Jelgava	2–2 (p. 6–5)	Jūrmala

Skonto Stadions
