= Ivan Shpakov =

Russian footballer

Personal information
- Full name: Ivan Vladimirovich Shpakov
- Date of birth: 8 June 1986 (age 40)
- Place of birth: Kingisepp, Russian SFSR
- Height: 1.75 m (5 ft 9 in)
- Position: Forward

Youth career
- FC Zenit St. Petersburg

Senior career*
Years	Team	Apps	(Gls)
2002	FC Mostransgaz Gazoprovod	5	(0)
2003–2006	FC Krylia Sovetov Samara	14	(0)
2006	FC Shinnik Yaroslavl	9	(0)
2007	FC Krylia Sovetov Samara	6	(0)
2008	FK Rīga	10	(1)
2009–2010	FK Ventspils	33	(11)
2010	FC Zhemchuzhina-Sochi	5	(0)
2011–2013	FC Metallurg-Kuzbass Novokuznetsk	65	(15)
2013–2014	FC Fakel Voronezh	15	(0)
2015	FC Ryazan	0	(0)
2015	FC Nosta Novotroitsk	3	(0)
2016–2017	FC Kaluga	20	(2)
- * Club domestic league appearances and goals

Ivan Vladimirovich Shpakov (Russian: Иван Владимирович Шпаков; born 8 June 1986) is a Russian former professional footballer.

== Club career ==
He made his professional debut in the Russian Second Division in 2002 for FC Mostransgaz Gazoprovod. He played 3 games in the UEFA Cup 2005–06 qualification rounds for FC Krylia Sovetov Samara.

In June 2009 he was signed by FK Ventspils. In August 2010 he left the team, becoming a free agent after a very successful season with the club.
