= Deniss Kačanovs =

Latvian footballer

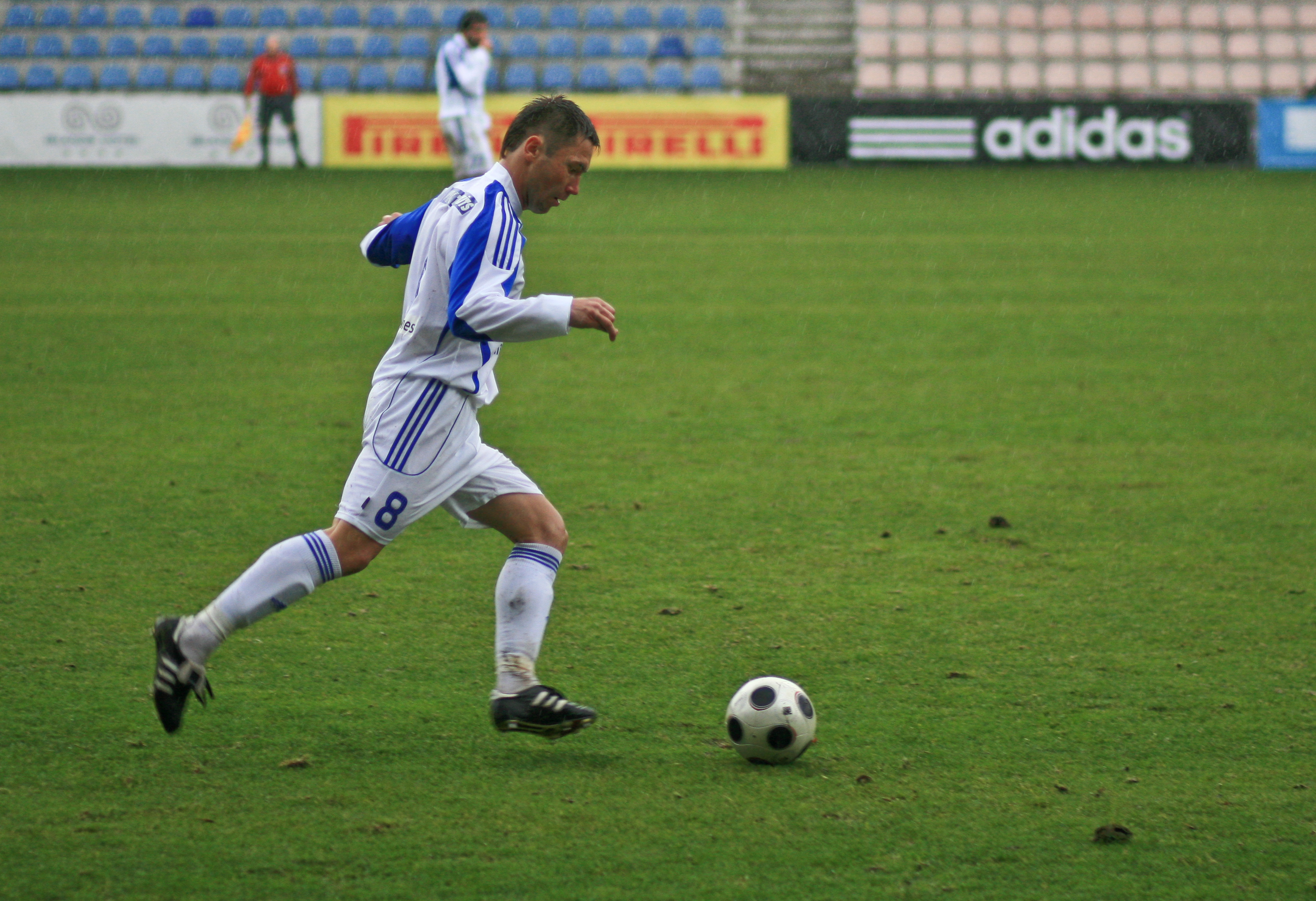
- Kačanovs playing for FK Ventspils

Personal information
- Full name: Deniss Kačanovs
- Date of birth: 27 November 1979 (age 46)
- Place of birth: Riga, then part of Latvian SSR, Soviet Union
- Height: 1.81 m (5 ft 11 1/2 in)
- Position: Defender

Team information
- Current team: FK Daugava Rīga
- Number: 8

Senior career*
Years	Team	Apps	(Gls)
1999–2000	FC Universitate Riga	12	(0)
2000–2001	FK Ventspils	9	(0)
2001–2002	FK Daugava Rīga	12	(0)
2002–2009	FK Ventspils	151	(6)
2009–2011	Skonto Riga	16	(1)
2011–2012	Persema Malang	22	(1)
2012–2013	FC Jūrmala	13	(0)
2013–	FK Daugava Rīga	59	(1)

International career^{‡}
2006–2011	Latvia	29	(0)

Managerial career
- 2014–: FK Daugava Rīga (assistant manager)
- * Club domestic league appearances and goals as of 2 January 2015 ‡ National team caps and goals as of 2 January 2015

Deniss Kačanovs (born 27 November 1979) is a Latvian football defender, currently playing for Adlwang in the second lowest Austrian football league.

== Club career ==
Kačanovs started his career in FC Universitate Riga, later on joining FK Ventspils in 2000. In 2001, he joined FK Daugava Rīga, but in 2002 rejoined FK Ventspils once again. He played there for 7 years, making 151 appearances and scoring 6 league goals. He was released in 2009 because of being in suspect of betting on his own team's results, and was without a club for more than a year. His fault wasn't proved then, and the player stated he had had several conflicts with FK Ventspils for a long time. In February 2011 he joined Skonto Riga. In a league match against his former team FK Ventspils Kačanovs seriously injured their defender Vladimirs Bespalovs with a rude tackle from behind, whose further career then seemed to be in doubt for a moment. In fact, Bespalovs is a son of FK Ventspils president Jurijs Bespalovs. He thought that Kačanovs had done this on purpose and handed in a request for Latvian Football Federation to ban the player. Kačanovs was given a long-term disqualification then. In September 2011, after having played 16 matches and scored 1 goal for Skonto, he left for Indonesian team Persema Malang. In July 2012, Kačanovs returned to the Latvian Higher League, signing with FC Jūrmala. He played 13 matches for Jūrmala, finishing the league in the sixth position. In January 2013 Kačanovs joined the Latvian Higher League club Daugava Rīga.

== International career ==
Kačanovs made his debut for Latvia in 2006. So far he has collected 29 appearances, scoring no goals. He played his last international match in 2011.

== Honours ==
FK Ventspils

- Latvian Higher League
  - 2006, 2007, 2008
- Latvian Football Cup
  - 2004, 2005, 2007

National Team

- Baltic Cup
  - 2008
