= Sporta Aģentūras Stadions =

Multi-use stadium

Coordinates: 56.509502°N 27.3406363°E

Sporta Aģentūras Stadions is a multi-use stadium in Rēzekne, Latvia. It is currently used mostly for football matches and is the home stadium of SK Blāzma that competes in the Virsliga. The stadium holds 3,000 people.
