= Alessandro Zamperini =

Italian footballer (born 1982)

Personal information
- Date of birth: 15 August 1982 (age 44)
- Place of birth: Rome, Italy
- Height: 1.90 m (6 ft 3 in)
- Position: Defender

Youth career
- Lazio
- Roma
- 2001: West Ham United

Senior career*
Years	Team	Apps	(Gls)
2001–2002	Portsmouth	26	(2)
2002–2003	Modena	25	(0)
2003–2005	Acireale	47	(1)
2005–2006	Sambenedettese	13	(0)
2006–2007	Ternana	27	(1)
2007–2008	Cisco Roma	29	(0)
2008–2009	Valle del Giovenco	33	(0)
2009	FK Ventspils	4	(0)
- * Club domestic league appearances and goals

Alessandro Zamperini (born 15 August 1982) is an Italian former footballer, who played as a defender.

== Club career ==
Alessandro Zamperini started his footballing career at Serie A giants Lazio, the club he has supported as a child, before signing his first professional contract, at fierce rivals Roma, then moving to English First Division club Portsmouth appearing for them 26 times and scoring 2 goals against Gillingham and Crystal Palace. Zamperini then moved back to Italy with Serie A team Modena, though he did not make an appearance for them. He then had spells with several Serie C1 clubs, including Acireale, Sambenedettese and Ternana Serie B before moving to side Cisco Roma in 2007, and Valle del Giovenco in 2008.

In 2009, he moved abroad again, joined Latvian champions FK Ventspils, and also scoring a goal in the 2009–10 UEFA Europa League in a surprising 1–1 away draw against Sporting Clube de Portugal.

On 2 August 2013 Zamperini was suspended for 2 years due to 2011 match-fixing scandal.
