= Ventspils Olimpiskais Stadions =

Multi-purpose stadium in Latvia

Coordinates: 57.38794°N 21.5721°E

Ventspils Olimpiskais Stadions, more commonly called the Ventspils Stadions, is a multi-purpose stadium in Ventspils, Latvia. It is currently used mostly for football matches. Ventspils Stadions was the home stadium for the Latvian Virslīga former club FK Ventspils. It is one of the most famous football stadia in Latvia. The stadium holds 3,200 people.

== See also ==
- Ventspils Olympic Center Basketball Hall
