= Ritvars Rugins =

Latvian footballer

Personal information
- Date of birth: 17 October 1989 (age 37)
- Place of birth: Tukums, Latvian SSR, USSR (now Republic of Latvia)
- Height: 1.72 m (5 ft 8 in)
- Position: Midfielder

Youth career
- FK Tukums 2000
- FK Ventspils-2

Senior career*
Years	Team	Apps	(Gls)
2007–2011	FK Ventspils	69	(9)
2012	Illichivets Mariupol	1	(0)
2012–2014	Skonto Riga	72	(5)
2015–2019	FK Ventspils	97	(6)
2019–2022	Riga	63	(0)

International career
2008–2010	Latvia U21	12	(1)
2010–2020	Latvia	39	(0)
- * Club domestic league appearances and goals

Ritvars Rugins (born 17 October 1989]) is a Latvian former professional footballer who played as a midfielder. He made 39 appearances for the Latvia national team.

== Club career ==
=== Early career and FK Ventspils ===
Ritvars Rugins started playing football at the age of 9 in his local club Tukums 2000. In 2007, he joined the Latvian Higher League club FK Ventspils. In 2008, he played his first league match for the team, it was his only appearance that season. In 2009, he played 14 games and scored twice. In 2010, he scored 3 goals in 22 games. Year 2011 saw him playing 29 matches and scoring 4 times. During that season Rugins was tried out in different positions, as the coach Sergei Podpaly faced a lack of defenders all season long. Ritvars usually plays as a midfielder, but periodically has also been part of the defensive and attacking lines, being described as a very universal player. Rugins is a three-time Latvian champion and has also won the Latvian Cup and Baltic League - each once respectively.

=== Illichivets Mariupol ===
On 9 January 2012 Rugins signed a contract with the Ukrainian Premier League club Illichivets Mariupol. He made his league debut for the club on 10 March 2012, coming on as a substitute in the 72nd minute against Shakhtar Donetsk.

=== Skonto Riga ===
In July 2012, Rugins returned to the Latvian Higher League, signing for Skonto Riga.

=== Riga FC ===
Rugins signed with Riga FC on 7 January 2019. He departed the club at the end of the 2022 season.

== International career ==
Rugins played for Latvia U21 until 2010, scoring once in 12 matches. He made his debut for the national team in a friendly match against China (0–1) on 17 November 2010. As of August, 2012, Rugins has been capped eight times for the national side.
