= Vitalijus Kavaliauskas =

Lithuanian footballer

Personal information
- Date of birth: 2 July 1983 (age 43)
- Height: 1.83 m (6 ft 0 in)
- Position: Forward

Senior career*
Years	Team	Apps	(Gls)
1998–2008	Ekranas	269	(79)
2009	Granit Mikashevichi	19	(1)
2010–2011	Liepājas Metalurgs	52	(13)
2012–2013	Ekranas	43	(16)
2014–2015	Utenis Utena	33	(11)
2015–2016	Lokomotyvas Radviliškis	9	(4)

International career
2002–2011	Lithuania	17	(3)
- * Club domestic league appearances and goals as of 31 December 2015

Vitalijus Kavaliauskas (born 2 July 1983) is a Lithuanian former footballer.
