= Vīts Rimkus =

Latvian footballer

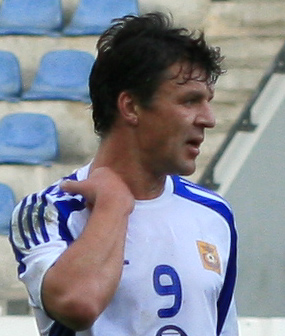
- Rimkus playing for FK Ventspils

Personal information
- Date of birth: 21 June 1973 (age 53)
- Place of birth: Riga, Latvian SSR, Soviet Union (now Latvia)
- Height: 1.80 m (5 ft 11 in)
- Position: Striker

Senior career*
Years	Team	Apps	(Gls)
1993	Pārdaugava Rīga	14	(2)
1994	DAG Rīga	15	(3)
1995	Amstrig Riga	26	(8)
1995–1996	FC Winterthur	10	(8)
1996–1997	1. FC Nürnberg	13	(2)
1997–1998	Erzgebirge Aue	10	(0)
1998	Skonto Riga	15	(11)
1999–2000	FK Valmiera	38	(6)
2001–2004	FK Ventspils	100	(70)
2005	FC Rostov	9	(0)
2005–2009	FK Ventspils	109	(66)
2009–2010	FK Ekranas	26	(15)
2011–2012	FC Jūrmala	18	(10)
2012	Spartaks Jūrmala	1	(0)
2013	FB Gulbene	23	(20)
2014	AFA Olaine	3	(4)
2016	Skonto FC	19	(13)

International career
1995–2008	Latvia	73	(11)
- * Club domestic league appearances and goals

Vīts Rimkus (born 21 June 1973) is a Latvian former professional footballer who played as a striker.

== Club career ==
Born in Riga, Vīts Rimkus started his career in 1993 with Pārdaugava Rīga, scoring twice in 14 league appearances. After a promising start youngster was transferred to DAG Rīga in 1994. He played 15 league games for the team and scored three goals that season. He kept changing clubs and the next season was spent with another club from Riga, Amstrig Rīga. The 1995 season turned out to be a loud start of his career as he managed to net eight times in 26 matches.

Several offers to go abroad appeared and the player chose to move to Switzerland, signing a contract with FC Winterthur. Scoring eight goals in ten matches that season, he moved to Germany in 1996, signing for 1. FC Nürnberg. Despite the loud boom in Switzerland, Rimkus could not prove himself in Nürnberg, so he was given away to another German club, Erzgebirge Aue. Ten matches with no goals made him return to Latvia then.

In 1998, he was signed by Skonto Riga. After a successful season the player was given away to FK Valmiera, where he played for two years, showing great performance. In 2001 FK Ventspils signed Rimkus for free and had him playing there until 2004. Scoring 70 goals in 100 matches, he attracted attention from many Russian clubs and was signed by FC Rostov in 2005. Staying goalless in nine games he was soon released and he returned to FK Ventspils. In the next five seasons, as a player of FK Ventspils, Rimkus scored 66 league goals in 109 matches. In 2009, he left the club after rumors about betting on his own team results, but nothing was proved in the end, and later it turned out to be a serious conflict with the board of the club.

In 2010 Rimkus moved to Lithuania, signing a one-year contract with FK Ekranas. He became the highest scorer of the team that season with 15 goals in 26 matches respectively, just one goal behind the top scorer of the league Povilas Lukšys. After the season Rimkus moved to Cyprus, signing a half-season contract with the Cypriot Fourth Division club Finikas Ayias Marinas Chrysochous. In July 2011 he returned to Latvia and signed a contract with the Latvian Higher League newcomers FC Jūrmala. Despite joining in mid-season, with ten goals in 18 games he became the team's highest scorer in the league. In March 2012 Rimkus was signed by the Latvian Higher League newcomers Spartaks Jūrmala, but after just playing one match he was released.

In January 2013 Rimkus joined the Latvian First League club FB Gulbene. With 20 goals in 23 matches during the 2013 season Rimkus became his club's second best top scorer. Despite Rimkus scoring a goal in the promotion/relegation play-offs, his team lost to FS METTA/Latvijas Universitāte 5–2 on aggregate and failed to secure a place in the Latvian Higher League for the 2014 season. Prior to the 2014 Latvian First League season Rimlus moved to AFA Olaine. Aged 40, he scored four goals in the first three league appearances for the club, but then left the team turning to playing indoor football.

Before the start of the 2016 Latvian First League season Rimkus returned to association football at the age of 42, joining Skonto FC. Throughout the season Rimkus participated in 19 league matches, scoring 13 goals.

== International career ==
Rimkus has played 73 international matches and scored 11 goals for the Latvia national team. He debuted in 1995, and played at Euro 2004.

== Personal life ==
Rimkus is of Lithuanian descent.

== Honours ==
- CIS Cup top goalscorer: 2009 (shared)
