= JFK Olimps =

Latvian football club

- Full name: Junioru futbola klubs "Olimps": JFK Olimps/RFS (2009–11); JFK Olimps/ASK (2008); JFK Olimps (2005–07)
- Founded: 2005
- Dissolved: 2012
- Ground: Daugava Stadium; UL Stadium; Riga, Latvia
- Capacity: 6,000
- Chairman: –
- Manager: –
- League: Virslīga
- 2011: 9th
Home colours	Away colours

JFK Olimps was a Latvian football club, playing in the top division of Latvian football. The club was from the city of Riga. According to a study from January 2011, the club was the youngest team in Europe, with an average age of 19.02 years.

== History ==
Club crest used from 2005 until 2009

Olimps was founded in 2005 because there were only seven teams in the top division of the Latvian football league. It was made up of young (U-21) players from Skonto-2, Liepājas Metalurgs-2 and Ventspils-2. In the 2005 season, they dropped from Virslīga. In 2006, they won 1. līga and returned to Virslīga. Despite finishing last in the 2007 Virslīga season, Olimps retained their place for 2008 thanks to the expansion of the league.

In 2007, Olimps got to the Latvian Cup final thus earning a place in the UEFA cup qualifiers for the upcoming season.

At the end of the 2008 season, the youth academy of the dissolved FK Rīga joined the club. Before the season, Olimps received the ASK prefix (Armijas sporta klubs), as it was supported by the Ministry of Defence, similarly to the club that existed in the 1920s and 1930s.

However, by 2009, due to the impact of Latvian financial crisis, the ministry dropped its funding. The team was dissolved in 2012, although legally the club still exists.

== League and Cup history ==
JFK Olimps

Season	Division (Name)	Pos./Teams	Pl.	W	D	L	GS	GA	P	Latvian Football Cup
2005	1st (Virsliga)	7/(8)	28	5	4	19	24	68	19	1/2 finals
2006	2nd (1.līga)	1/(16)	30	26	2	2	111	15	80	1/8 finals
2007	1st (Virsliga)	8/(8)	28	2	2	24	15	63	8	Runner-up

JFK Olimps/ASK

Season	Division (Name)	Pos./Teams	Pl.	W	D	L	GS	GA	P	Latvian Football Cup
2008	1st (Virsliga)	10/(10)	18	1	6	11	12	30	9	1/8 finals

JFK Olimps/RFS

Season	Division (Name)	Pos./Teams	Pl.	W	D	L	GS	GA	P	Latvian Football Cup
2009	1st (Virsliga)	5/(9)	32	11	5	16	53	60	38	Not Held
2010	1st (Virsliga)	8/(10)	27	5	6	16	31	63	21	1/2 finals
2011	1st (Virsliga)	9/(9)	32	1	3	28	19	117	6	1/8 finals

== Europe record ==
Season	Competition	Round	Club	Home	Away	Aggregate
2008/09	UEFA Cup	1QR	JFK Olimps/ASK v St Patrick's Athletic (Republic of Ireland)	0–1	0–2	0–3
