= FK Daugava (2003) =

Latvian football club

FK Daugava Rīga
- Full name: Futbola klubs "Daugava" Rīga: FK Jūrmala (2003–08); FK Jūrmala-VV (2008–12)
- Founded: 2003
- Dissolved: 2015
- Ground: Daugava Stadium; Riga, Latvia
- Capacity: 5,000
- Chairman: Igors Kostins
- Manager: Armands Zeiberliņš
- League: Virsliga
- 2014: 7th
- Website: www.daugavariga.com
Home colours	Away colours

FK Daugava Rīga was a Latvian football club, based at the Daugava Stadium in Riga. They played in the Latvian Higher League. The last manager of the team was Armands Zeiberliņš.

From the club's foundation in 2003 till 2009 the club was known as FK Jūrmala and based in the city of Jūrmala. In 2010, they changed their name to FK Jūrmala-VV, but in March 2012 the club moved to Riga, changing its name to FK Daugava Rīga.

== History ==
The club was founded in 2003 as FK Jūrmala and its goals included creating a club infrastructure, building a modern stadium in the Sloka neighbourhood of Jūrmala and popularization of sports among children and youth of Jūrmala all of which they succeeded in doing.

In its first season FK Jūrmala played in the Latvian First League, winning the championship and being promoted to the Latvian Higher League. In its first season Jūrmala finished 5th in the top tier. However, despite the club's board having high ambitions, signing several former Latvian international players, in the following seasons FK Jūrmala could not manage to achieve the top 3 spots in the league table. Even more, in 2007 the team suffered a financial crisis, when some of its top players left the team in mid season.

In the next few seasons, the club's financial resources were limited and the club was on the verge of bankruptcy in 2010. The team was saved and changed its name to FK Jūrmala-VV, adding the letters VV from the name of their sponsors "Vienos Vārtos".

Even though the 2010 season was successful for Jūrmala-VV, financial problems hit yet again in 2011. Results suffered and the team barely managed to avoid relegation. After the end of the season there were discussions on whether the club should continue its existence or not, because Jūrmala city would have three clubs in the top league. Jūrmala City Council did not support this option, so Jūrmala-VV were forced to look for other options. The club also faced the problem of where to base their home-stadium, because of the overload of the Slokas Stadium having to provide a base for three teams – FC Jūrmala, FK Jūrmala-VV itself, and the newly promoted FK Spartaks Jūrmala.

In March 2012, a decision was made to move to Riga and use the Daugava Stadium. Because of changing the location, the club had to change its name too. It was changed to FK Daugava Rīga. The Latvian Football Federation backed this, allowing the club to take the place of Jūrmala-VV in the Latvian Higher League. Daugava finished 9th in the 2012 season, and had to participate in the promotion/relegation play-offs against the Latvian First League runners-up BFC Daugava. Winning 1–0 at home and 3–1 away (4–1 on aggregate) the club managed to secure themselves a place in the next season's championship. In 2013 Daugava Rīga achieved the best result in the history of the club finishing the domestic championship in the top four and qualifying for the UEFA Europa League. In their UEFA Europa League debut Daugava Rīga were beaten in the first qualifying round by the Scottish club Aberdeen. The 2014 season saw Daugava finish 7th.

The club folded in 2015.

== Crests ==
Crest of FK Jūrmala

Crest of Daugava Riga

== Honours ==
- Latvian First League
  - Champions (1): 2003
- Latvian Cup
  - Runners-up (1): 2010

== League and Cup history ==
Season	League	Position	Pl	W	D	L	Goals	P	Cup
2003	1. līga	1	27	25	2	0	132‒7	77	1/4 finals
2004	Virslīga	5	28	8	10	10	30‒33	34	1/4 finals
2005	Virslīga	6	28	9	5	14	37‒38	32	1/4 finals
2006	Virslīga	6	28	11	4	13	36‒36	37	1/4 finals
2007	Virslīga	6	28	7	5	16	28‒51	26	1/4 finals
2008	Virslīga	7	30	10	10	10	35‒34	40	Semi-finals
2009	Virslīga	4	32	12	4	16	42‒60	40	Change of format
2010	Virslīga	5	27	8	4	15	30‒45	28	Runners-up
2011	Virslīga	8	32	5	6	21	35‒76	21	Semi-finals
2012	Virslīga	9	36	5	12	19	42–79	27	1/4 finals
2013	Virslīga	4	27	14	6	7	44–21	48	Semi-finals
2014	Virslīga	7	36	13	4	19	48–64	43	1/4 finals

== Participation in Baltic League ==
Year	Position
2009–10	Round of 16
2010–11	Quarter-finals

== European Record ==
Season	Competition	Round	Club	1st Leg	2nd Leg	Aggregate
2014–15	UEFA Europa League	1Q	(Scotland) Aberdeen	0–5	0–3	0–8

== Managers ==
Name	Period
(Latvia) Jurijs Popkovs	2003–06
(Latvia) Vladimirs Babičevs	2007
(Russia) Oleg Stogov	Jan 2007 – July 7
(Latvia) Gatis Ērglis	July 2007 – Dec 07
(Latvia) Vladimirs Babičevs	Jan 23, 2008 – Sept 11
(Latvia) Jurijs Popkovs	Sept 2011–12
(Lithuania) Virginijus Liubšys	Dec 2012 – Dec 13
(Lithuania) Arvydas Skrupskis	Mar 2014 – May 14
(Latvia) Armands Zeiberliņš	May 2014–present
