= 2008 Latvian Higher League =

Latvian football league season for the highest division

Latvian Higher League
- Season: 2008
- Champions: FK Ventspils
- Relegated: JFK Olimps/RFS
- UEFA Champions League: FK Ventspils
- UEFA Europa League: FK Liepajas Metalurgs; Skonto FC; Dinaburg FC
- Top goalscorer: (Latvia) Vits Rimkus (15 goals)

The 2008 Virslīga season was the 17th Virslīga season. It began on 5 April 2008 with the first round of games and ended on 9 November 2008 with the final matches of the championship and relegation rounds. Ventspils were the defending champions.

Location of teams in the Latvian Higher League 2008

== Season details ==
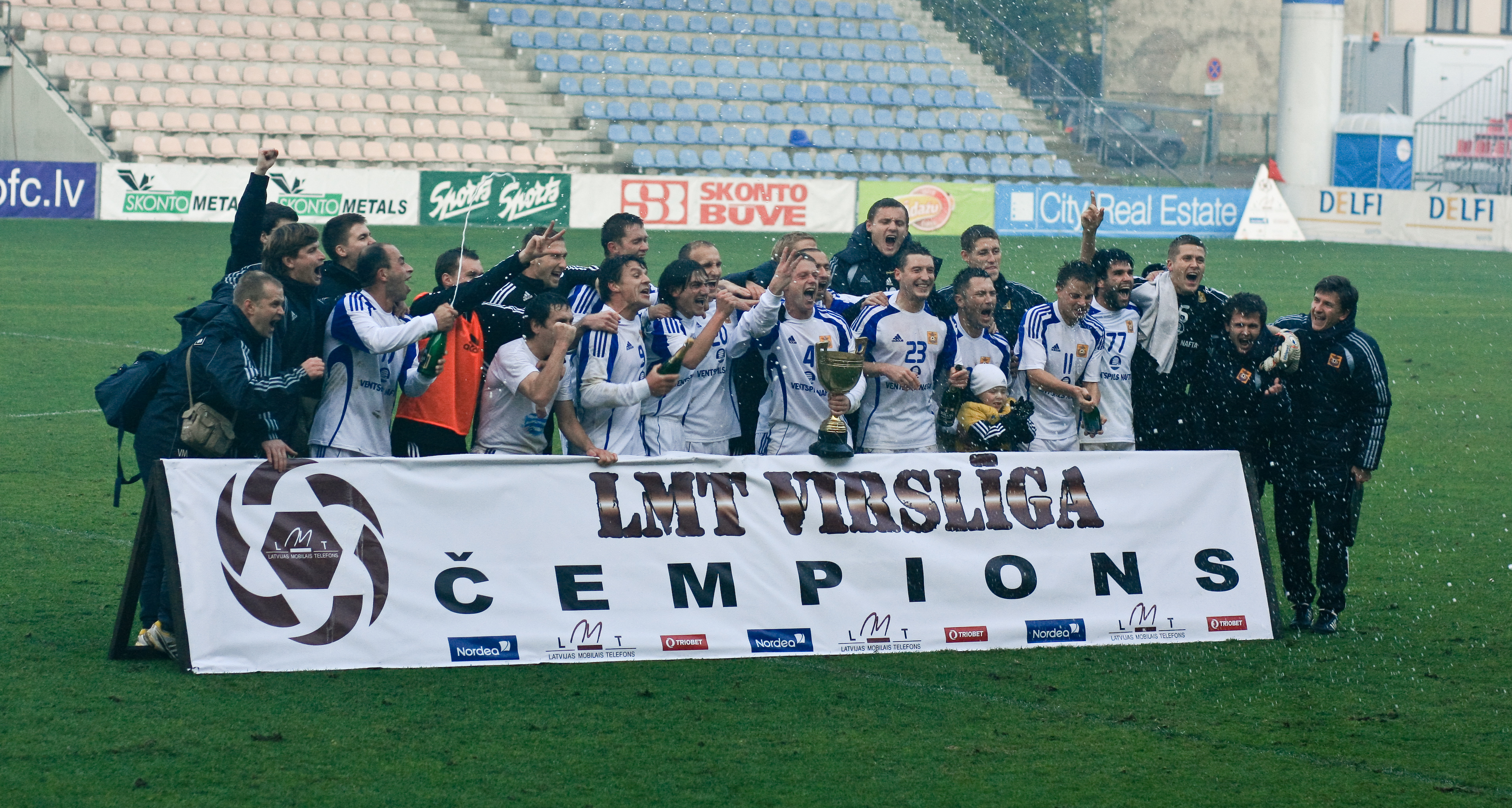
FK Ventspils - champions for third time in the row

For the 2008 season the league has expanded to ten clubs, and the fixture format has changed. Due to expansion there was no relegation at the end of the 2007 season, and the top two clubs from the 1. līga 2007 season, champions FK Vindava (from Ventspils), and second placed SK Blāzma (from Rēzekne) were both promoted. From the 2008 season on, the league will be held in two rounds.

In the first round each club played all the other nine clubs twice, home and away starting with Matchday 1 on 5 April and finishing with Matchday 18 on 10 August.

In the second round there were two "mini leagues", with the top six clubs after the First Round, playing each other twice and clubs in 7th to 10th place after the First Round playing each other four times. Second round matches started on 24 August and finished on 9 November.

At the end of the season, the club finishing bottom of the Virslīga were automatically relegated to the 1. līga, and the champions of the 1. līga were automatically promoted, taking the place of the relegated club. The club that finished next to the bottom in the Virslīga play a two-legged playoff for the final place in the Virslīga for the next season with the club that finished second in 1. līga.

== First round ==
=== Standings ===
Pos	Team	Pld	W	D	L	GF	GA	GD	Pts	Qualification
1	Ventspils	18	12	4	2	33	6	+27	40	Qualification for championship round
2	Skonto	18	11	3	4	28	19	+9	36	Qualification for championship round
3	Dinaburg	18	9	5	4	22	13	+9	32	Qualification for championship round
4	Rīga	18	9	3	6	28	27	+1	30 (Note: RĪG 2–2 LIE; LIE 2–2 RĪG)	Qualification for championship round
5	Liepājas Metalurgs	18	7	9	2	27	17	+10	30	Qualification for championship round
6	Daugava Daugavpils	18	6	6	6	27	22	+5	24	Qualification for championship round
7	Vindava Ventspils	18	4	5	9	14	27	−13	17	Qualification for relegation round
8	Jūrmala	18	3	7	8	15	27	−12	16	Qualification for relegation round
9	Blāzma Rēzekne	18	2	4	12	8	26	−18	10	Qualification for relegation round
10	Olimps/RFS	18	1	6	11	12	30	−18	9	Qualification for relegation round

Source: Latvian Football Federation (in Latvian)
Rules for classification: 1) points; 2) head-to-head points; 3) head-to-head goal difference; 4) head-to-head goals scored; 5) goal difference; 6) number of goals scored.

=== Results ===
Home \ Away	BLĀ	DGD	DIN	JŪR	LIE	RFS	RĪG	SKO	VEN	VIN
Blāzma Rēzekne		1–1	0–2	1–0	0–1	1–1	1–0	0–2	0–3	1–1
FC Daugava Daugavpils	2–0		0–1	0–0	4–1	3–1	6–1	1–3	1–4	1–1
Dinaburg FC	2–1	0–3		2–2	0–0	1–0	2–0	3–0	0–1	1–1
FK Jūrmala	1–0	0–0	0–0		1–1	1–1	1–3	1–1	0–1	2–1
SK Liepājas Metalurgs	1–0	2–0	1–0	7–2		1–1	2–2	1–2	0–0	2–0
Olimps/RFS	1–1	0–0	0–2	2–1	1–3		1–3	0–1	1–3	0–1
FK Rīga	2–1	1–0	1–1	3–1	2–2	3–1		1–2	1–0	1–2
Skonto FC	1–0	3–1	0–3	2–1	2–2	3–1	1–2		1–0	3–0
Ventspils	3–0	2–2	3–0	2–0	0–0	0–0	2–0	1–0		1–0
Vindava Ventspils	2–0	1–2	0–2	0–1	0–0	2–0	1–2	1–1	0–7	

Source: Matchday 1–9 results Matchday 10–18 results (in Latvian)
Legend: Blue = home team win; Yellow = draw; Red = away team win.

== Second round ==
=== Championship round ===
==== Standings ====
Pos	Team	Pld	W	D	L	GF	GA	GD	Pts	Qualification
1	Ventspils (C)	28	19	6	3	53	14	+39	63	Qualification for Champions League second qualifying round
2	Liepājas Metalurgs	28	14	11	3	48	25	+23	53	Qualification for Europa League second qualifying round (Note: Daugava Daugavpils won the Latvian Football Cup 2008 competition, thereby qualifying for UEFA Europa League 2009–10 second qualification round. However, Daugava Daugavpils merged with Dinaburg, so the Europa League spots were redistributed based on league position.)
3	Skonto	28	15	7	6	43	31	+12	52	Qualification for Europa League second qualifying round
4	Dinaburg	28	10	8	10	32	31	+1	38	Qualification for Europa League first qualifying round
5	Daugava Daugavpils	28	10	7	11	40	35	+5	37	
6	Rīga	28	10	3	15	36	55	−19	33	

Source: Latvian Football Federation (in Latvian)
Rules for classification: 1) points; 2) head-to-head points; 3) head-to-head goal difference; 4) head-to-head goals scored; 5) goal difference; 6) number of goals scored.
(C) Champions

==== Results ====
Home \ Away	DGD	DIN	LIE	RĪG	SKO	VEN
FC Daugava Daugavpils		2–0	1–2	2–0	2–1	0–2
Dinaburg FC	3–3		0–0	3–1	0–1	0–3 (Note: The match originally finished 0–0, but was eventually awarded with as won by a score of 3–0 to Ventspils because Dinaburg FC fielded player who was not in match protocol.)
SK Liepājas Metalurgs	3–1	3–1		3–0	0–0	1–2
FK Rīga	0–2	3–2	1–4		1–2	0–2
Skonto FC	1–0	1–1	2–3	3–1		2–2
Ventspils	1–0	1–0	0–2	5–1	2–2	

Source: Latvian Football Federation (in Latvian)
Legend: Blue = home team win; Yellow = draw; Red = away team win.

=== Relegation round ===
==== Standings ====
Pos	Team	Pld	W	D	L	GF	GA	GD	Pts	Qualification or relegation
1	Jūrmala	30	10	10	10	35	34	+1	40	
2	Vindava Ventspils	30	9	9	12	27	41	−14	36	
3	Blāzma Rēzekne (O)	30	5	8	17	20	43	−23	23	Qualification for relegation play-offs
4	Olimps/RFS (R)	30	2	11	17	22	47	−25	17	Relegation to Latvian First League

Source: Latvian Football Federation (in Latvian)
Rules for classification: 1) points; 2) head-to-head points; 3) head-to-head goal difference; 4) head-to-head goals scored; 5) goal difference; 6) number of goals scored.
(O) Play-off winners; (R) Relegated

==== Results ====
First and second games
Home \ Away	BLĀ	JŪR	RFS	VIN
Blāzma Rēzekne		2–1	1–1	0–1
FK Jūrmala	2–0		2–0	3–0
Olimps/RFS	0–0	1–1		0–2
Vindava Ventspils	2–0	0–0	1–0	

Source: Latvian Football Federation (in Latvian)
Legend: Blue = home team win; Yellow = draw; Red = away team win.

Third and fourth games
Home \ Away	BLĀ	JŪR	RFS	VIN
Blāzma Rēzekne		1–3	1–0	2–2
FK Jūrmala	2–1		3–0	0–0
Olimps/RFS	2–2	0–2		5–1
Vindava Ventspils	1–2	2–1	1–1	

Source: Latvian Football Federation (in Latvian)
Legend: Blue = home team win; Yellow = draw; Red = away team win.

==== Relegation play-offs ====
Blāzma Rēzekne, the 9th placed team in the Virslīga, and 1. līga runners-up, Tranzīts Ventspils, competed in a two-legged play-off for a spot in the Virslīga 2009. Blāzma Rēzekne won 6–1 on aggregate and thereby kept their spot in the next season of the Virslīga.

15 November 2008
14:00 GMT+2

Tranzīts Ventspils	1 – 5	Blāzma Rēzekne
Baturinskis 42'	Report (in Latvian)	Gramovičs 55', 64', 74' (pen.); Kurakins 70'; Silovs 86'

2. pamatskolas stadions, Ventspils
Attendance: 250
Referee: Vadims Direktorenko (Riga)

18 November 2008
13:00 GMT+2

Blāzma Rēzekne	1 – 0	Tranzīts Ventspils
Silovs 78'	Report (in Latvian)

Sporta Aģentūras Stadions, Rēzekne
Attendance: 338
Referee: Andrejs Sipailo

== Topscorers ==
Rank	Player	Club	Goals
1	Vits Rimkus (LAT)	FK Ventspils	14
2	Kristaps Grebis (LAT)	FK Liepājas Metalurgs	13
2	Oļegs Malašenoks (LAT)	FK Jūrmala	13
4	Andrejs Butriks (LAT)	FK Ventspils	11
5	Mikalay Ryndzyuk (BLR)	Dinaburg FC	9
5	Vladimir Dvalishvili (GEO)	Skonto FC	9
