= 2010 Latvian Higher League =

Annual soccer tournament

Latvian Higher League
- Season: 2010
- Champions: Skonto Riga; 15th title
- Relegated: Tranzīts Ventspils; Jaunība Riga
- Champions League: Skonto Riga
- Europa League: Ventspils; Liepājas Metalurgs; Daugava Daugavpils
- Baltic League: Skonto Riga; Ventspils; Liepājas Metalurgs; Daugava Daugavpils; FK Jūrmala-VV; Jelgava
- Matches: 135
- Goals: 416 (3.08 per match)
- Top goalscorer: Nathan Júnior; Deniss Rakels (18 goals each)
- Biggest home win: Metalurgs 8–0 Jaunība
- Biggest away win: Jaunība 0–9 RFS/Olimps
- Highest scoring: Jaunība 0–9 RFS/Olimps

2010 Latvian Higher League (Latvian: LMT Virslīga 2010) was the 19th season of top-tier football in Latvia. It began on 9 April 2010 with the first round of games. Liepājas Metalurgs were the defending champions, having won their second league title last season.

With the re-expansion of the league to 10 clubs, the format of the competition was altered for the third year in a row. The ten clubs played 18 rounds of matches, once at home and once away, against each of the other nine clubs in the league. After this, another nine rounds of matches were played for a total of 27 matches. The clubs finishing in the first five positions after 18 rounds received the benefit of hosting five of their last nine matches.

== Teams ==
Due to a match fixing scandal last season, Dinaburg FC were excluded from the Latvian Higher League and were relegated to the Latvian First League.

Promoted to the Higher League from the First Division automatically were last season's First Division champions, Jelgava.

Daugava Rīga finished in 8th place in last year's Higher League competition and competed in a promotion/relegation playoff against the runners-up of the First Division, Jaunība Rīga. Jaunība Rīga won this two-legged playoff 1–1 (1–0 on away goals scored) and won promotion to the Higher League for this season and Daugava Rīga was relegated to the First Division.

Despite finishing last year's First Division competition in 9th place, Daugava Daugavpils were offered a place in this year's Higher League competition, which the club accepted.

=== Team summaries ===
Location of teams in the 2010 Latvian Higher League

Club	Location	Stadium	Capacity	Current manager
FC Daugava	Daugavpils	Daugava Stadium (Daugavpils)	3,500	(Georgia (country)) Tamaz Pertia
FK Jaunība	Riga	Daugava Stadium (Riga)	5,000	(Latvia) Sergejs Davidovs
FK Jelgava	Jelgava	Zemgales Olimpiskais Sporta Centrs	1,560	(Latvia) Dainis Kazakevičs
FK Jūrmala-VV	Jūrmala	Slokas Stadium	5,000	(Latvia) Vladimirs Babičevs
FK Ventspils	Ventspils	Olimpiskais Stadium	3,200	(Italy) Nunzio Zavettieri
JFK Olimps/RFS	Riga	Latvijas Universitates Stadions	5,000	(Latvia) Mihails Miholaps
Metalurgs	Liepāja	Daugava Stadium (Liepāja)	5,500	(Germany) Rüdiger Abramczik
SK Blāzma	Rēzekne	Sporta Aģentūras Stadions	3,000	(Latvia) Eriks Grigjans
Skonto FC	Riga	Skonto Stadium	10,000	(Latvia) Aleksandrs Starkovs
FC Tranzit	Ventspils	Ventspils 2. pamatskolas stadions	500	(Russia) Igor Kichigin

== League table ==
Pos	Team	Pld	W	D	L	GF	GA	GD	Pts	Qualification or relegation
1	Skonto (C)	27	22	3	2	86	16	+70	69	Qualification for Champions League second qualifying round
2	Ventspils	27	20	3	4	68	18	+50	63	Qualification for Europa League second qualifying round (Note: Ventspils won the 2010–11 Latvian Football Cup competition and qualified for the second qualifying round of UEFA Europa League, so 4th-place Daugava Daugavpils qualified for the first qualifying round.)
3	Liepājas Metalurgs	27	19	4	4	70	20	+50	61	Qualification for Europa League second qualifying round
4	Daugava Daugavpils	27	16	8	3	35	16	+19	56	Qualification for Europa League first qualifying round
5	Jūrmala-VV	27	8	4	15	30	45	−15	28	
6	Jelgava	27	6	7	14	36	45	−9	25	
7	Blāzma Rēzekne	27	7	3	17	27	57	−30	24	
8	Olimps/RFS	27	5	6	16	31	63	−32	21	
9	Tranzīts Ventspils (R)	27	5	4	18	17	56	−39	19	Qualification for relegation play-offs
10	Jaunība Rīga (R)	27	4	4	19	16	80	−64	16	Relegation to Latvian First League

Source: Latvian Football Federation (in Latvian)
Rules for classification: 1st points; 2nd head-to-head points; 3rd head-to-head goal difference; 4th overall wins; 5th goal difference; 6th goals scored
(C) Champions; (R) Relegated

== Results ==
=== Regular home/away matches ===
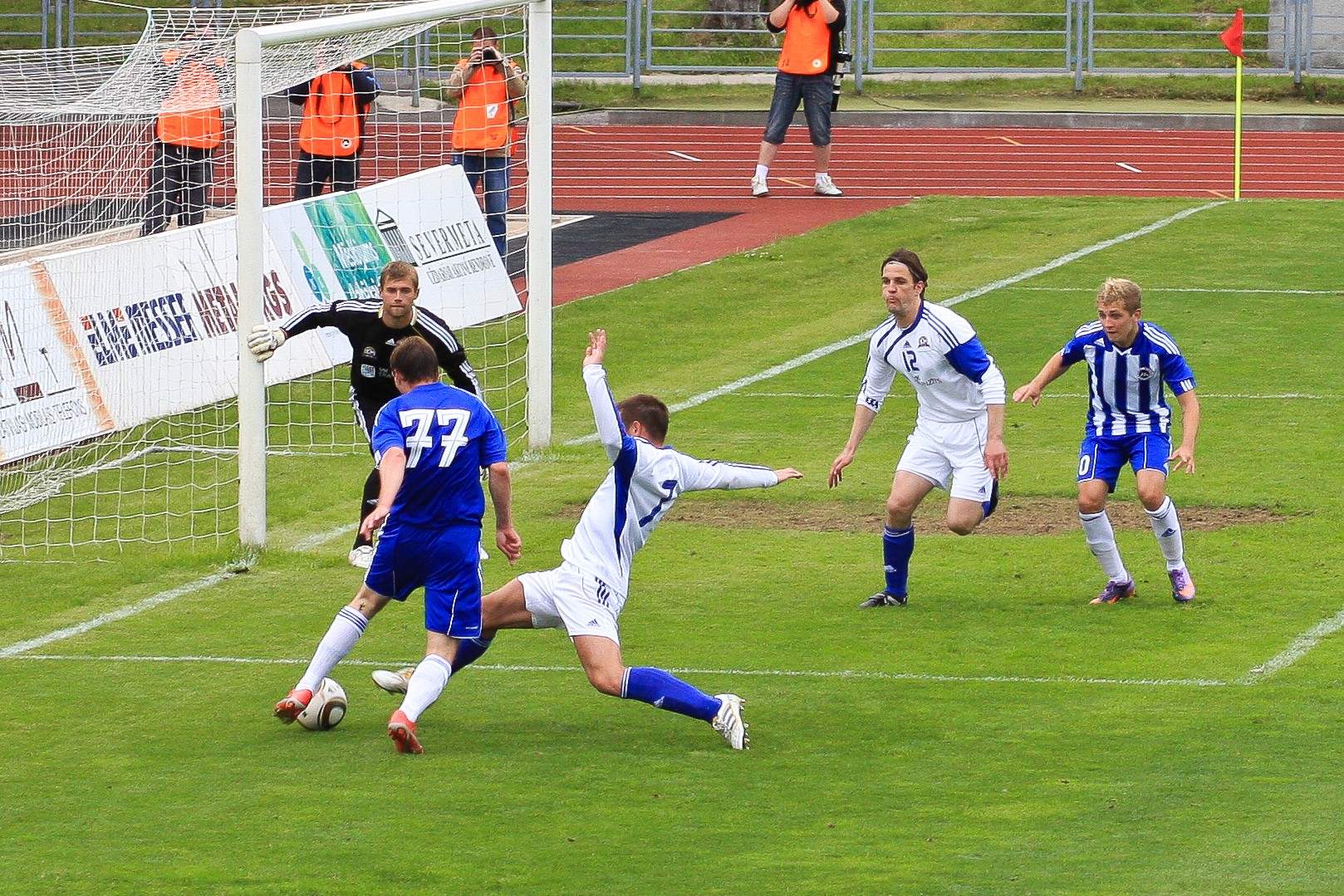
Aleksejs Soleičuks tries to block a shot by Vitalijus Kavaliauskas on a goal guarded by Jevgēņijs Sazanovs in the match between SK Liepājas Metalurgs and FC Tranzit

Home \ Away	BLĀ	DGD	JAU	JEL	JVV	LIE	RFS	SKO	TRA	VEN
Blāzma Rēzekne		3–1	1–2	0–0	0–4	1–4	2–0	1–3	2–0	0–5
FC Daugava Daugavpils	2–0		1–0	1–1	1–0	1–1	2–0	1–1	2–0	1–0
Jaunība Rīga	0–1	1–1		1–1	0–2	2–3	0–9	0–3	1–0	0–5
Jelgava	4–0	3–3	4–1		1–2	1–2	4–0	0–5	2–1	1–2
FK Jūrmala-VV	0–0	0–1	0–1	2–1		1–2	2–2	0–4	2–1	1–4
SK Liepājas Metalurgs	4–0	0–1	4–0	3–1	1–2		4–0	1–2	2–0	0–0
Olimps/RFS	2–1	1–1	2–2	2–1 (Note: Jelgava were assigned as home team for both first and second round of matches against Olimps/RFS for unknown reasons; this match was the latter of these two and has been put in this table cell for organisational reasons.)	0–2	0–3		1–3	0–1	0–3
Skonto FC	6–0	1–0	7–0	4–1	4–2	0–0	6–1		5–0	1–0
Tranzīts Ventspils	3–1	0–1	2–0	1–1	1–1	0–4	2–2	0–2		0–2
Ventspils	1–0	1–1	5–0	2–1	1–0	2–4	7–0	2–1	2–0	

Source: Latvian Football Federation (in Latvian)
Legend: Blue = home team win; Yellow = draw; Red = away team win.

=== Extra home matches ===
Home \ Away	BLĀ	DGD	JAU	JEL	JVV	LIE	RFS	SKO	TRA	VEN
Blāzma Rēzekne					2–1	2–3	1–1	1–4		
FC Daugava Daugavpils	3–1		3–1		2–0				1–0	0–1
Jaunība Rīga	0–4			0–1			2–2		0–1	
Jelgava	2–0	0–1							0–0	2–4
FK Jūrmala-VV			0–1	1–1		1–4	0–3	0–2		
SK Liepājas Metalurgs		0–0	8–0	3–0			2–1	1–2		
Olimps/RFS		0–2		2–1					0–2	0–3
Skonto FC		0–1	6–0	2–1			4–0			2–2
Tranzīts Ventspils	0–3				2–3	0–6		0–6		
Ventspils	2–0		4–1		3–1	0–1			5–0	

Source: Latvian Football Federation (in Latvian)
Legend: Blue = home team win; Yellow = draw; Red = away team win.

=== Relegation play-offs ===
At season's end, the 9th place club in the Latvian Higher League, Tranzīts Ventspils, was supposed to face the runners-up of the Latvian First League, FC Jūrmala, in a two-legged playoff, with the winner being awarded a spot on next year's Higher League competition. However, before this playoff began, the LFF received information from Tranzits that it would not participate in the playoff and, further, was forfeiting its place in the Latvian Higher League. Because of this, FC Jurmala achieved promotion to the Higher League automatically.

== Top goalscorers ==
Source: LMT Virslīga 2010 (in Latvian)

18 goals

- (Latvia) Deniss Rakels (Liepājas Metalurgs)
- (Brazil) Nathan Júnior (Skonto)

15 goals

- (Latvia) Jurijs Žigajevs (Ventspils)

12 goals

- (Latvia) Kristaps Grebis (Liepājas Metalurgs)

11 goals

- (Latvia) Oļegs Malašenoks (Jelgava)

9 goals

- (Latvia) Eduards Višņakovs (Ventspils)
- (Lithuania) Vitalijus Kavaliauskas (Liepājas Metalurgs)

8 goals

- (Latvia) Artūrs Karašausks (Skonto)
- (Latvia) Andrejs Perepļotkins (Skonto)
- (Turkmenistan) Ruslan Mingazov (Skonto)
- (Latvia) Daniils Turkovs (Skonto)
- (Belarus) Pavel Ryzhevski (Blāzma)

* Players in italics left the clubs they are listed in during the season.

== Awards ==
=== Monthly awards ===
Player of the Month
Month	Player	Club
April	(Latvia) Artūrs Karašausks	Skonto
May	(Latvia) Oļegs Malašenoks	Jelgava
June	(Brazil) Nathan Júnior	Skonto
July	(Latvia) Kaspars Dubra	Skonto
August	(Latvia) Jurijs Žigajevs	Ventspils
September	(Latvia) Aleksandrs Cauņa	Skonto
October/November	(Latvia) Jurijs Žigajevs	Ventspils

=== Golden boot ===
- Deniss Rakels (Liepājas Metalurgs) with 18 goals.

Nathan Júnior from Skonto also scored 18 goals during the season, but while Rakels had scored all his goals from game-play, Junior netted 3 goals from the penalty spot.

=== Team of the tournament ===
(Selected by www.sportacentrs.com)

Goalkeepers: Marks Bogdanovs (Jelgava), Kaspars Ikstens (Skonto Riga)

Defenders: Jevgēņijs Simonovs (Daugava Daugavpils), Kaspars Dubra (Skonto Riga), Tomas Tamošauskas (Liepājas Metalurgs), Vitālijs Maksimenko (Skonto Riga), Māris Smirnovs (Tranzit Ventspils), Yuriy Shelenkov (Daugava Daugavpils)

Midfielders: Ruslan Mingazov (Skonto Riga), Jurijs Žigajevs (Ventspils), Arturs Zjuzins (Ventspils), Valērijs Afanasjevs (Daugava Daugavpils), Michael Tukura (Ventspils), Takafumi Akahoshi (Liepājas Metalurgs)

Forwards: Nathan Júnior (Skonto Riga), Deniss Rakels (Liepājas Metalurgs), Daniils Turkovs (Skonto Riga), Oļegs Malašenoks (Jelgava)

=== Best player awards ===
- Goalkeeper: Kaspars Ikstens (Skonto Riga)
- Defender: Vitālijs Smirnovs (Skonto Riga)
- Midfielder: Jurijs Žigajevs (Ventspils)
- Forward: Nathan Júnior (Skonto Riga)
- Manager of the season: Aleksandrs Starkovs (Skonto Riga)
- The best youth player (under the age of 21): Artūrs Zjuzins (Ventspils)
- Player of the season: Jurijs Žigajevs (Ventspils)

=== Organization ===
- Fair-play award: Skonto Riga
- The best matches' organization: Skonto Riga
- The best referee: Andrejs Sipailo and Harijs Gudermanis (assistant)

== See also ==
- 2010–11 Latvian Football Cup
