= List of Latvian football transfers summer 2007 =

This is a list of Latvian football transfers in the 2007 summer transfer window by club.

All transfers mentioned are shown in the external links at the bottom of the page. If you want to insert a transfer that isn't shown there, please add a reference.

== Latvian Higher League ==
=== FK Ventspils ===
In: Note: Flags indicate national team as defined under FIFA eligibility rules; some limited exceptions apply. Players may hold more than one non-FIFA nationality.

| No. | Pos. | Nation | Player |

Out: Note: Flags indicate national team as defined under FIFA eligibility rules; some limited exceptions apply. Players may hold more than one non-FIFA nationality.

| No. | Pos. | Nation | Player |
|---|---|---|---|
| — | DF | (Latvia) LVA | Kirils Mitins (to FK Vindava) |
| — | GK | (Latvia) LVA | Māris Eltermanis (on loan to Dinaburg FC) |

=== FHK Liepājas Metalurgs ===
In: Note: Flags indicate national team as defined under FIFA eligibility rules; some limited exceptions apply. Players may hold more than one non-FIFA nationality.

| No. | Pos. | Nation | Player |
|---|---|---|---|
| — | MF | (Latvia) LVA | Imants Bleidelis (from FK Jūrmala) |

Out: Note: Flags indicate national team as defined under FIFA eligibility rules; some limited exceptions apply. Players may hold more than one non-FIFA nationality.

| No. | Pos. | Nation | Player |

=== Skonto FC ===
In: Note: Flags indicate national team as defined under FIFA eligibility rules; some limited exceptions apply. Players may hold more than one non-FIFA nationality.

| No. | Pos. | Nation | Player |
|---|---|---|---|
| — | DF | (Latvia) LVA | Vadims Gaiļus (from JFK Olimps) |
| — | MF | (Latvia) LVA | Igors Kozlovs (from JFK Olimps) |

Out: Note: Flags indicate national team as defined under FIFA eligibility rules; some limited exceptions apply. Players may hold more than one non-FIFA nationality.

| No. | Pos. | Nation | Player |
|---|---|---|---|
| — | FW | (Latvia) LVA | Alans Siņeļņikovs (to JFK Olimps) |
| — | MF | (Latvia) LVA | Andrejs Štolcers (on loan to JFK Olimps) |
| — | FW | (Latvia) LVA | Ivans Lukjanovs (on loan to JFK Olimps) |

=== Dinaburg FC ===
In: Note: Flags indicate national team as defined under FIFA eligibility rules; some limited exceptions apply. Players may hold more than one non-FIFA nationality.

| No. | Pos. | Nation | Player |
|---|---|---|---|
| — | FW | (Latvia) LVA | Vladimirs Volkovs (from FK Zibens/Zemessardze) |
| — | GK | (Latvia) LVA | Māris Eltermanis (on loan from FK Ventspils) |
| — | FW | (Latvia) LVA | Maksims Daņilovs (on loan from FC Daugava) |
| — | MF | (Latvia) LVA | Maksims Deņisevičš (on loan from FC Daugava) |

Out: Note: Flags indicate national team as defined under FIFA eligibility rules; some limited exceptions apply. Players may hold more than one non-FIFA nationality.

| No. | Pos. | Nation | Player |
|---|---|---|---|
| — | FW | (Latvia) LVA | Jurijs Sokolovs (to FC Daugava) |
| — | DF | (Latvia) LVA | Dmitrijs Čugunovs (to SK Blāzma) |

=== FC Daugava ===
In: Note: Flags indicate national team as defined under FIFA eligibility rules; some limited exceptions apply. Players may hold more than one non-FIFA nationality.

| No. | Pos. | Nation | Player |
|---|---|---|---|
| — | MF | (Latvia) LVA | Nikolajs Poļakovs (from FK Jūrmala) |
| — | FW | (Latvia) LVA | Jurijs Sokolovs (from Dinaburg FC) |

Out: Note: Flags indicate national team as defined under FIFA eligibility rules; some limited exceptions apply. Players may hold more than one non-FIFA nationality.

| No. | Pos. | Nation | Player |
|---|---|---|---|
| — | FW | (Latvia) LVA | Maksims Daņilovs (on loan to Dinaburg FC) |
| — | MF | (Latvia) LVA | Maksims Deņisevičš (on loan to Dinaburg FC) |
| — | FW | (Latvia) LVA | Igors Tolkačs (on loan to SK Blāzma) |

=== FK Jūrmala ===
In: Note: Flags indicate national team as defined under FIFA eligibility rules; some limited exceptions apply. Players may hold more than one non-FIFA nationality.

| No. | Pos. | Nation | Player |
|---|---|---|---|
| — | MF | (Latvia) LVA | Dmitrijs Halvitovs (from FK Auda) |
| — | MF | (Latvia) LVA | Oļegs Žatkins (on loan from FK Rīga) |

Out: Note: Flags indicate national team as defined under FIFA eligibility rules; some limited exceptions apply. Players may hold more than one non-FIFA nationality.

| No. | Pos. | Nation | Player |
|---|---|---|---|
| — | DF | (Latvia) LVA | Vladimirs Žavoronkovs (to FK Rīga) |
| — | MF | (Latvia) LVA | Nikolajs Poļakovs (to FC Daugava) |
| — | MF | (Latvia) LVA | Imants Bleidelis (to FHK Liepājas Metalurgs) |
| — | ? | (Latvia) LVA | Arturs Gaidels (to FK Multibanka Rīga) |

=== FK Rīga ===
In: Note: Flags indicate national team as defined under FIFA eligibility rules; some limited exceptions apply. Players may hold more than one non-FIFA nationality.

| No. | Pos. | Nation | Player |
|---|---|---|---|
| — | DF | (Latvia) LVA | Vladimirs Žavoronkovs (from FK Jūrmala) |
| — | ? | (Latvia) LVA | Ingus Makovskis (from SK Blāzma) |

Out: Note: Flags indicate national team as defined under FIFA eligibility rules; some limited exceptions apply. Players may hold more than one non-FIFA nationality.

| No. | Pos. | Nation | Player |
|---|---|---|---|
| — | FW | (Latvia) LVA | Maksims Kamkins (to FS Metta-Latvijas Universitāte Rīga) |
| — | MF | (Latvia) LVA | Romāns Bespalovs (to FK Vindava) |
| — | DF | (Latvia) LVA | Dimitrijs Stepčenko (to FK Flaminko) |
| — | MF | (Latvia) LVA | Oļegs Žatkins (on loan to FK Jūrmala) |

=== JFK Olimps ===
In: Note: Flags indicate national team as defined under FIFA eligibility rules; some limited exceptions apply. Players may hold more than one non-FIFA nationality.

| No. | Pos. | Nation | Player |
|---|---|---|---|
| — | FW | (Latvia) LVA | Alans Siņeļņikovs (from Skonto FC) |
| — | MF | (Latvia) LVA | Andrejs Štolcers (on loan from Skonto FC) |
| — | FW | (Latvia) LVA | Ivans Lukjanovs (on loan from Skonto FC) |

Out: Note: Flags indicate national team as defined under FIFA eligibility rules; some limited exceptions apply. Players may hold more than one non-FIFA nationality.

| No. | Pos. | Nation | Player |
|---|---|---|---|
| — | DF | (Latvia) LVA | Vadims Gaiļus (to Skonto FC) |
| — | MF | (Latvia) LVA | Igors Kozlovs (to Skonto FC) |

== Others ==
=== FK Auda ===
In: Note: Flags indicate national team as defined under FIFA eligibility rules; some limited exceptions apply. Players may hold more than one non-FIFA nationality.

| No. | Pos. | Nation | Player |
|---|---|---|---|
| — | FW | (Cameroon) CMR | Emmanuel Wirdzemo Njodzeka (from FS Metta-Latvijas Universitāte Rīga) |

Out: Note: Flags indicate national team as defined under FIFA eligibility rules; some limited exceptions apply. Players may hold more than one non-FIFA nationality.

| No. | Pos. | Nation | Player |
|---|---|---|---|
| — | MF | (Latvia) LVA | Dmitrijs Halvitovs (to FK Jūrmala) |

=== SK Blāzma ===
In: Note: Flags indicate national team as defined under FIFA eligibility rules; some limited exceptions apply. Players may hold more than one non-FIFA nationality.

| No. | Pos. | Nation | Player |
|---|---|---|---|
| — | DF | (Latvia) LVA | Dmitrijs Čugunovs (from Dinaburg FC) |
| — | FW | (Latvia) LVA | Igors Tolkačs (on loan from FC Daugava) |

Out: Note: Flags indicate national team as defined under FIFA eligibility rules; some limited exceptions apply. Players may hold more than one non-FIFA nationality.

| No. | Pos. | Nation | Player |
|---|---|---|---|
| — | ? | (Latvia) LVA | Ingus Makovskis (to FK Rīga) |
| — | FW | (Latvia) LVA | Vladislavs Kozlovs (to FS Metta-Latvijas Universitāte Rīga) |

=== FK Elīza ===
In: Note: Flags indicate national team as defined under FIFA eligibility rules; some limited exceptions apply. Players may hold more than one non-FIFA nationality.

| No. | Pos. | Nation | Player |

Out: Note: Flags indicate national team as defined under FIFA eligibility rules; some limited exceptions apply. Players may hold more than one non-FIFA nationality.

| No. | Pos. | Nation | Player |
|---|---|---|---|
| — | ? | (Latvia) LVA | A. Vorobjovs (to FK Multibanka Rīga) |

=== FK Flaminko ===
In: Note: Flags indicate national team as defined under FIFA eligibility rules; some limited exceptions apply. Players may hold more than one non-FIFA nationality.

| No. | Pos. | Nation | Player |
|---|---|---|---|
| — | DF | (Latvia) LVA | Dimitrijs Stepčenko (to FK Rīga) |

Out: Note: Flags indicate national team as defined under FIFA eligibility rules; some limited exceptions apply. Players may hold more than one non-FIFA nationality.

| No. | Pos. | Nation | Player |

=== FS Metta-Latvijas Universitāte Rīga ===
In: Note: Flags indicate national team as defined under FIFA eligibility rules; some limited exceptions apply. Players may hold more than one non-FIFA nationality.

| No. | Pos. | Nation | Player |
|---|---|---|---|
| — | FW | (Latvia) LVA | Maksims Kamkins (from FK Rīga) |
| — | FW | (Latvia) LVA | Vladislavs Kozlovs (from SK Blāzma) |
| — | FW | (Latvia) LVA | Gatis Rožkalns (from FK Venta) |

Out: Note: Flags indicate national team as defined under FIFA eligibility rules; some limited exceptions apply. Players may hold more than one non-FIFA nationality.

| No. | Pos. | Nation | Player |
|---|---|---|---|
| — | FW | (Cameroon) CMR | Emmanuel Wirdzemo Njodzeka (to FK Auda) |

=== FK Multibanka ===
In: Note: Flags indicate national team as defined under FIFA eligibility rules; some limited exceptions apply. Players may hold more than one non-FIFA nationality.

| No. | Pos. | Nation | Player |
|---|---|---|---|
| — | ? | (Latvia) LVA | Arturs Gaidels (from FK Jūrmala) |
| — | ? | (Latvia) LVA | A. Vorobjovs (from FK Elīza) |

Out: Note: Flags indicate national team as defined under FIFA eligibility rules; some limited exceptions apply. Players may hold more than one non-FIFA nationality.

| No. | Pos. | Nation | Player |

=== FK Venta ===
In: Note: Flags indicate national team as defined under FIFA eligibility rules; some limited exceptions apply. Players may hold more than one non-FIFA nationality.

| No. | Pos. | Nation | Player |

Out: Note: Flags indicate national team as defined under FIFA eligibility rules; some limited exceptions apply. Players may hold more than one non-FIFA nationality.

| No. | Pos. | Nation | Player |
|---|---|---|---|
| — | FW | (Latvia) LVA | Gatis Rožkalns (to FS Metta-Latvijas Universitāte Rīga) |

=== FK Vindava ===
In: Note: Flags indicate national team as defined under FIFA eligibility rules; some limited exceptions apply. Players may hold more than one non-FIFA nationality.

| No. | Pos. | Nation | Player |
|---|---|---|---|
| — | MF | (Latvia) LVA | Romāns Bespalovs (from FK Rīga) |
| — | DF | (Latvia) LVA | Kirils Mitins (from FK Ventspils) |

Out: Note: Flags indicate national team as defined under FIFA eligibility rules; some limited exceptions apply. Players may hold more than one non-FIFA nationality.

| No. | Pos. | Nation | Player |

=== FK Zibens/Zemessardze ===
In: Note: Flags indicate national team as defined under FIFA eligibility rules; some limited exceptions apply. Players may hold more than one non-FIFA nationality.

| No. | Pos. | Nation | Player |

Out: Note: Flags indicate national team as defined under FIFA eligibility rules; some limited exceptions apply. Players may hold more than one non-FIFA nationality.

| No. | Pos. | Nation | Player |
|---|---|---|---|
| — | FW | (Latvia) LVA | Vladimirs Volkovs (to Dinaburg FC) |
