= Nikolajs Kozačuks =

Latvian footballer

Personal information
- Full name: Nikolajs Kozačuks
- Date of birth: 7 August 1985 (age 41)
- Place of birth: Ventspils, Latvian SSR, USSR (now Republic of Latvia)
- Height: 1.82 m (6 ft 0 in)
- Position: Right midfielder

Youth career
- Ventspils

Senior career*
Years	Team	Apps	(Gls)
2003–2006	Ventspils	18	(1)
2007	Vítkovice	8	(0)
2007–2008	Vindava	40	(18)
2009	Tukums 2000	7	(2)
2009	Olimpik-Shuvalan PFC	10	(0)
2010	Tranzit	9	(2)
2010–2011	Hapoel Ramat HaSharon	9	(0)
2011	Ahva Arraba	15	(2)
2011	Ventspils	7	(0)
2012–2013	Daugava Rīga	9	(0)
2013–2014	Górnik Łęczna	29	(5)
2014–2015	Górnik Łęczna II		
2015–2016	Eiger FK		
- * Club domestic league appearances and goals

Nikolajs Kozačuks (born 7 August 1985) is a Latvian former professional footballer who played as a midfielder.

== Club career ==
As a youth player, Kozačuks played for his local club FK Ventspils, being included in the first team squad for the 2003 season. The youngster played there till 2006 and during these 4 seasons was mainly used in the reserve team, although in the 2005 season he played 13 first team matches in the Latvian Higher League. During his time with Ventspils, Kozačuks helped the club win the Latvian Cup for three consecutive seasons. In January 2007, he moved to the Czech 2. Liga, signing a contract with FC Vítkovice. He played 8 matches for the club and left it at the end of the season, joining the Latvian First League club FK Vindava in July 2007. Scoring 10 goals, he helped the club win the league and earn a straight promotion to the Latvian Higher League. In the 2008 season he was the club's top scorer with 8 league goals as the club finished the season in the 8th position of the league table. As FK Vindava refused to play in the Latvian Higher League for the upcoming season, Kozačuks started the 2009 season with the Latvian First League club FK Tukums 2000. In July 2009 he moved to the Azerbaijan Premier League club Olimpik-Shuvalan, signing a two-year contract. Failing to establish himself as a first eleven player, at the start of 2010 Kozačuks returned to Ventspils, signing a contract with the Latvian Higher League club FC Tranzit. In summer 2010, he moved to the Israeli Liga Leumit and joined Hapoel Nir Ramat HaSharon. Kozačuks changed clubs within the league in February 2011, when he was transferred to Ahva Arraba. In July 2011, he returned to his local club FK Ventspils before the 2011–12 UEFA Europa League campaign. Kozačuks was included in the entry for the 2012 season of Daugava Rīga, but did not appear in a single match throughout the season. In 2013, he became a first eleven player, appearing in 9 league matches. In July 2013, Kozačuks moved to Polish I liga club Górnik Łęczna.

== Honours ==
Ventspils

- Latvian Higher League: 2011
- Latvian Cup: 2003, 2004, 2005, 2010–11

Vindava

- Latvian First League: 2007
