= Vladislavs Gabovs =

Latvian footballer (born 1987)

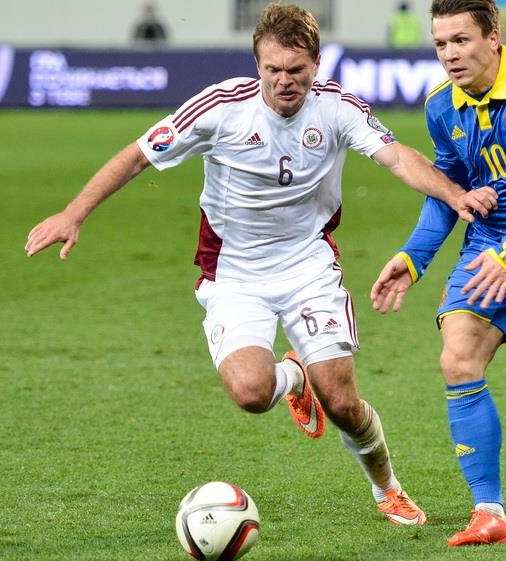

Personal information
- Full name: Vladislavs Gabovs
- Date of birth: 13 July 1987 (age 39)
- Place of birth: Riga, Latvian SSR, USSR (now Republic of Latvia)
- Height: 1.76 m (5 ft 9 in)
- Position: Right-back

Youth career
- Rīgas Futbola skola

Senior career*
Years	Team	Apps	(Gls)
2003	Multibanka Rīga	15	(0)
2004	Auda Rīga	20	(1)
2005	Olimps Rīga	26	(0)
2006–2007	TVMK Tallinn	42	(0)
2008	Daugava Daugavpils	23	(2)
2009	Dinaburg Daugavpils	21	(0)
2010–2011	Ventspils	36	(3)
2012	METTA/Latvijas Universitāte	22	(0)
2013–2014	Skonto Rīga	52	(2)
2015	Sokol Saratov	5	(0)
2015–2017	Korona Kielce	50	(0)
2017–2018	Pafos	25	(0)
2018–2020	Riga FC	18	(1)
2020	Liepāja	11	(0)
2020–2021	Jelgava	4	(0)
2022	Salaspils	7	(1)

International career
2003	Latvia U17	1	(0)
2004–2005	Latvia U19	6	(0)
2006–2008	Latvia U21	8	(0)
2013–2019	Latvia	41	(0)
- * Club domestic league appearances and goals

Vladislavs Gabovs (born 13 July 1987) is a Latvian former professional footballer who played as a right-back.

== Club career ==
As a youth player, Gabovs played for Rīgas Futbola skola, being taken to Multibanka Rīga in 2003. With 15 matches, the youngster helped the team finish the season as the runners-up of the Latvian First League. At the beginning of 2004 Gabovs joined Auda Rīga, making his debut in the Latvian Higher League. In the top flight debut season with 20 matches and 1 goal, Gabovs saw Auda being relegated after finishing the season at the bottom of the table. Despite the club's relegation Gabovs found his way to stay in the top league by joining the newly established club Olimps Rīga in early 2005. He helped the newcomers finish 7th in the league table as well as reach the semi-finals of the Latvian Cup.

At the beginning of 2006 Gabovs moved abroad, joining the Estonian Meistriliiga side TVMK Tallinn at the age of 19. During his first season in Tallinn Gabovs helped the club lift the Estonian Cup as well as the Estonian Supercup. In July 2006 he made his debut in the UEFA Champions League, coming on against the Icelandic club Fimleikafélag Hafnarfjarðar. In 2007 Gabovs became a bronze medalist of the Estonian championship together with TVMK.

In March 2008, Gabovs signed a two-year contract with Daugava, returning to the Latvian Higher League. During the same season Daugava managed to win the Latvian Cup for the first time in the club's history. After the regular season, Gabovs was included in the esports.lv team of the season. Following the merging of Daugava and Dinaburg Daugavpils at the beginning of 2009, Gabovs established himself a place in the first eleven, with the club continuing to play under the name of Dinaburg. During summer the same year, Gabovs went on trials with the Belarusian Premier League club BATE Borisov and the Ukrainian Premier League side Hoverla Uzhorod, but did not stay with either of them.

On 5 October 2009, Dinaburg was disqualified from the Latvian Higher League, suspected of match fixing. Furthermore, on 8 January 2010 the Latvian Football Federation conditionally disqualified 13 of the club's players, one of whom was also Gabovs. His involvement in match-fixing was never proven and in February 2010 Gabovs underwent a trial at Ventspils, signing a contract with them for two years. In 2010, he helped the club finish the domestic league as runners-up and also lifted the Baltic League trophy. In 2011, Gabovs became the champion of Latvia, won the Latvian Cup and once again participated in the final of the Baltic League, where Ventspils lost to Gabovs' future club Skonto Rīga. After the 2011 season, Gabovs was included in the LFF Latvian Higher League Team of the Tournament.

At the end of 2011, Gabovs suffered a serious injury, breaking his leg and being out of football for several months. In order to recover and reestablish himself as a first eleven player he joined METTA/Latvijas Universitāte, helping the club retain a place in the top tier of Latvian football in the 2012 season. His overall performance was praised by the club officials and Gabovs was nominated as one of the candidates for the METTA/Latvijas Universitāte Player of the Year award.

In February 2013, Gabovs moved to his former club's rivals and one of Latvia's top clubs Skonto Rīga, establishing himself in the first eleven soon after joining. In 2013, he helped the club finish the league as the runners-up with only one loss throughout the whole season. Furthermore, Skonto participated considerably well in the UEFA Europa League qualification, beating the Moldovan club FC Tiraspol on aggregate and the Czech side Slovan Liberec at home. In January 2014 Gabovs went on trial with the English Football League Championship club Blackpool, but due to managerial change at the time he was refused a place in the team. After the retirement of midfielder Juris Laizāns, Gabovs was elected as Skonto Rīga new captain for the upcoming season. Under his captaincy the club reached the Latvian Cup final, losing to FK Jelgava in penalties. Disregarding Skonto's immense financial problems, long-term debts, unpaid wages and sanctions from the Latvian Football Federation the club finished the 2014 season with Gabovs playing a substantial role in the right-back position.

== International career ==
Gabovs was a member of Latvia U-17, Latvia U-19 and Latvia U-21 football teams. On 15 November 2008 he was called up to the Latvia national football team reserves for a friendly match against Skonto Rīga. Gabovs made his full international debut on 24 May 2013, coming on as a substitute in the 74th minute and replacing Ritvars Rugins in the friendly match against Qatar. In May 2014 he helped Latvia win the Baltic Cup for the second time in a row. Gabovs established himself as a first eleven player in the following matches of the UEFA Euro 2016 qualification.

== Personal life ==
While playing for FS METTA/Latvijas Universitāte, Gabovs was studying at the University of Latvia Faculty of Physics and Mathematics and his training schedule was subordinated to the studies.

== Honours ==
TVMK Tallinn

- Estonian Cup: 2005–06
- Estonian Supercup: 2006

Daugava

- Latvian Cup: 2008

Ventspils

- Latvian Higher League: 2011
- Latvian Cup: 2010–11
- Baltic League: 2009–10

Latvia

- Baltic Cup: 2014
