= 1998 UEFA European Under-21 Championship qualification Group 4 =

Football tournament qualification stage

The teams competing in Group 4 of the 1998 UEFA European Under-21 Championship qualifying competition were Austria, Belarus, Estonia, Latvia, Scotland and Sweden.

== Standings ==
Team	Pld	W	D	L	GF	GA	GD	Pts
Sweden	10	9	0	1	30	6	+24	27
Austria	10	6	2	2	21	12	+9	20
Belarus	10	6	2	2	17	7	+10	20
Latvia	10	2	2	6	6	18	−12	8
Scotland	10	2	1	7	10	20	−10	7
Estonia	10	1	1	8	4	25	−21	4

	(Austria)	(Belarus)	(Estonia)	(Latvia)	(Scotland)	(Sweden)
Austria	—	2–0	7–1	0–0	4–0	0–4
Belarus	1–1	—	3–1	2–0	1–0	0–1
Estonia	0–1	1–1	—	0–1	0–1	0–2
Latvia	1–3	0–2	0–1	—	0–0	0–2
Scotland	1–2	0–3	4–0	2–4	—	1–4
Sweden	4–1	1–3	5–0	5–0	2–1	—

== Matches ==
All times are CET.

31 May 1996

Sweden	1 – 3	Belarus
Osmanovski 24'	[ Report]	Skripchenko 7', 15'; Denisyuk 83'

Tingvalla IP, Karlstad
Attendance: 2,000
Referee: Jürgen Aust (Germany)

30 August 1996

Belarus	3 – 1	Estonia
Lisovskiy 15'; Polyakov 39'; Vostrykaw 55'	[ Report]	Kolbasenko 41'

City Stadium, Molodechno
Attendance: 2,000
Referee: Takhir Souleimanov (Azerbaijan)
30 August 1996

Austria	4 – 0	Scotland
Brenner 5'; Stieglmair 41'; Brunmayr 43', 59'	[ Report]

Ertl Glas Stadion, Amstetten
Attendance: 800
Referee: Juan Antonio Fernández Marín (Spain)
31 August 1996

Latvia	0 – 2	Sweden
	[ Report]	Persson 81'; D.Andersson 90'

Latvijas Universitates Stadions, Riga
Attendance: 1,000
Referee: Hugo Luyten (Netherlands)

4 October 1996

Estonia	1 – 1	Belarus
Kolbasenko 40'	[ Report]	Vostrykaw 38'

Kadriorg Stadium, Tallinn
Attendance: 200
Referee: Albert Wiltgen (Luxembourg)
6 October 1996

Latvia	0 – 0	Scotland
	[ Report]

Daugava Stadium, Riga
Attendance: 1,500
Referee: Eric Romain (Belgium)

8 October 1996

Estonia	0 – 1	Scotland
	[ Report]	Hamilton 30'

Kadriorg Stadium, Tallinn
Attendance: 600
Referee: Lars Gerner (Denmark)
8 October 1996

Sweden	4 – 1	Austria
Persson 19' (pen.); Ljungberg 22', 30'; Pettersson 41'	[ Report]	Micheu 90'

Strömvallen, Gävle
Attendance: 2,667
Referee: Pascal Garibian (France)
10 October 1996

Belarus	2 – 0	Latvia
Polyakov 39'; Razumaw 46'	[ Report]

Dinamo Stadium, Minsk
Attendance: 2,500
Referee: Serhiy Tatulian (Ukraine)

9 November 1996

Austria	0 – 0	Latvia
	[ Report]

Alpenstadion, Gloggnitz
Attendance: 800
Referee: Suheil Daood (Israel)
9 November 1996

Scotland	1 – 4	Sweden
Johannesson 40' (o.g.)	[ Report]	Pettersson 49'; Lantz 55'; Ljungberg 69', 77'

Tannadice Park, Dundee
Attendance: 3,878
Referee: Metin Tokat (Turkey)

28 March 1997

Scotland	4 – 0	Estonia
Harper 23'; Glass 37'; Hamilton 47'; Anderson 70'	[ Report]

Forthbank Stadium, Stirling
Attendance: 3,223
Referee: Lawrence Sammut (Malta)

1 April 1997

Scotland	1 – 2	Austria
Hamilton 64'	[ Report]	Aufhauser 32'; McCluskey 41' (o.g.)

Fir Park, Motherwell
Attendance: 4,079
Referee: Aron Huzu (Romania)

29 April 1997

Latvia	0 – 3	Belarus
	[ Report]	Romaschenko 32' (pen.), 83'; Razumaw 80'

Jāņa Daliņa stadions, Valmiera
Attendance: 1,360
Referee: Jon Skjervold (Norway)
29 April 1997

Austria	7 – 1	Estonia
Weissenberger 3'; Aufhauser 10', 17', 75'; Brunmayr 49', 62', 65'	[ Report]	Allas 89'

Ertl Glas Stadion, Amstetten
Attendance: 1,000
Referee: Vesselin Bogdanov (Bulgaria)
29 April 1997

Sweden	2 – 1	Scotland
Mellberg 3'; Jönsson 86'	[ Report]	Hamilton 80'

Edsborgs IP, Trollhättan
Attendance: 2,064
Referee: Ľuboš Micheľ (Slovakia)

17 May 1997

Estonia	0 – 1	Latvia
	[ Report]	Koļesņičenko 29'

Kadriorg Stadium, Tallinn
Attendance: 500
Referee: Brian Lawlor (Wales)

7 June 1997

Belarus	1 – 0	Scotland
Ryndzyuk 71'	[ Report]

Dinamo Stadium, Minsk
Attendance: 10,000
Referee: Jacek Granat (Poland)
7 June 1997

Latvia	1 – 3	Austria
Koļesņičenko 55'	[ Report]	Aufhauser 48'; Weissenberger 71'; Brunmayr 81'

Jāņa Daliņa stadions, Valmiera
Attendance: 1,300
Referee: Miroslav Liba (Czech Republic)
7 June 1997

Estonia	0 – 2	Sweden
	[ Report]	Persson 81'; E.Johansson 85'

Kadriorg Stadium, Tallinn
Attendance: 300
Referee: Mika Peltola (Finland)

19 August 1997

Belarus	0 – 1	Sweden
	[ Report]	Wahlstedt 65'

Dinamo Stadium, Minsk
Attendance: 6,000
Referee: Vencel Tóth (Hungary)
19 August 1997

Estonia	0 – 1	Austria
	[ Report]	Brunmayr 28'

Haapsalu linnastaadion, Haapsalu
Attendance: 300
Referee: Ihor Yarmenchuk (Ukraine)

5 September 1997

Latvia	0 – 1	Estonia
	[ Report]	Vahtramäe 17'

Latvijas Universitates Stadions, Riga
Attendance: 400
Referee: Eyjólfur Ólafsson (Iceland)
5 September 1997

Austria	0 – 4	Sweden
	[ Report]	A.Svensson 42', 68'; Persson 62' (pen.); Pachà 76'

Josef Keiblinger Stadion, Tulln
Attendance: 2,500
Referee: Adrian Stoica (Romania)
5 September 1997

Scotland	0 – 3	Belarus
	[ Report]	U.Makowski 52'; Lisovskiy 78'; Skripchenko 84'

McDiarmid Park, Perth
Attendance: 3,102
Referee: Mikko Vuorela (Finland)

9 September 1997

Belarus	1 – 1	Austria
Vostrykaw 38'	[ Report]	Weissenberger 53'

Dinamo Stadium, Minsk
Attendance: 2,000
Referee: Gary Willard (England)
9 September 1997

Sweden	5 – 0	Latvia
Persson 6', 16' (pen.); Osmanovski 12', 27'; D.Andersson 35'	[ Report]

Enavallen, Enköping
Attendance: 3,619
Referee: Lars Gerner (Denmark)

10 October 1997

Scotland	2 – 4	Latvia
I.Anderson 32' (pen.); Graham 42'	[ Report]	Poļakovs 11'; Sļesarčuks 23'; Pelcis 54'; Līdaks 57'

Almondvale Stadium, Livingston
Attendance: 1,780
Referee: Milan Mitrović (Slovenia)
10 October 1997

Sweden	5 – 0	Estonia
Persson 14'; Bärlin 22', 69'; Lantz 63'; Enqvist 64'	[ Report]

Eyravallen, Örebro
Attendance: 1,845
Referee: Bohdan Benedik (Slovakia)
10 October 1997

Austria	2 – 0	Belarus
Glatzer 11'; Hopfer 90'	[ Report]

Lindenstadion, Eisenstadt
Attendance: 2,000
Referee: Eric Romain (Belgium)

== Goalscorers ==
- TBD
