= 2008 Latvian Football Cup =

Football competition held in Latvia

The Latvian Football Cup 2008 was the 67th edition of the Latvian football knockout tournament that contested between April 18 and June 15, 2008.

FK Daugava Daugavpils successfully pursued its first title in the final against FK Ventspils, 3–0, in Skonto Stadions, Riga. Daugava Daugavpils continued on to the second qualifying round of the UEFA Europa League 2009–10.

== First round ==
April 18, 2008
FK SELGA Lapmežciems	w/o	FK Jelgava
FK Aizkraukle	w/o	FK Jēkabpils
April 19, 2008
FS Metta-LU Rīga	10–0	FK Madona/Kvarcs
April 20, 2008
FK Spartaks Jūrmala	3–2	FK Ozolnieki
FK Tranzīts	2–1	SK ELVI Kuldīga
JFC Kauguri/PBLC	1–2	UPTK Liepāja
FK Mērsrags	1–3	Nikars Rīga
SFK Varavīksne/V.O.V.A Liepāja	w/o	FK Talsi
FK Viesulis	3–1	FK Auda/Alberts Rīga
FK Pļaviņas DM	1–6	FK Valka
OSC/FK-33 Ogre	1–1	FK Dinamo-Rīnūži/LASD	aet, p. 4–2
Sakret/Mantija	2–3	BJSS Preiļu rajona

== Second round ==
April 26, 2008
FK Tranzīts	0–3	FS Metta-LU Rīga
SFK Varavīksne/V.O.V.A Liepāja	2–3	FK Jēkabpils
FK Spartaks Jūrmala	2–0	BJSS Preiļu rajona
April 27, 2008
FK Valka	2–4	FK Jelgava
UTPK Liepāja	1–1	FK Viesulis	aet, p. 1–4
Nikars Rīga	3–2	OSC/FK-33 Ogre

== Third round ==
April 30, 2008
FS Metta-LU Rīga	1–3	FK Jūrmala
FK Jēkabpils	0–3	FK Vindava Ventspils
FK Spartaks Jūrmala	0–4	Skonto FC
FK Jelgava	0–2	FK Ventspils
FK Viesulis	0–13	FK Liepājas Metalurgs
Nikars Rīga	0–9	FK Rīga
SK Blāzma	0–0	Dinaburg FC	aet, p. 10–9
JFK Olimps Rīga	0–1	FK Daugava Daugavpils

== Quarterfinals ==
May 7, 2008
FK Ventspils	3–1	FK Liepājas Metalurgs
Skonto FC	2–0	FK Rīga
FK Jūrmala	3–0	SK Blāzma
FK Daugava Daugavpils	2–1	FK Vindava Ventspils

== Semifinals ==
May 21, 2008
FK Ventspils	2–1	Skonto FC
FK Jūrmala	1–2	FK Daugava Daugavpils

== Final ==
June 15, 2008

FK Daugava Daugavpils	1 – 1 (aet)	FK Ventspils
Šimić 79'	Report (in Latvian)	Savčenkovs 43'
Penalties
Ryndzyuk (penalty scored); Šimić (penalty scored); Rudņevs (penalty scored)	3–0	Koļesņičenko (penalty missed); Dubensky (penalty missed); Ziziļevs (penalty missed)

Skonto Stadions, Riga
Attendance: 1,800
Referee: Vadims Direktorenko
