= 2007 Latvian First League =

Latvian football league season for 2nd division

Statistics of Latvian First League for the 2007 season.

== Overview ==
It was contested by 16 teams, and FK Vindava Ventspils won the championship.

== League standings ==
Pos	Team	Pld	W	D	L	GF	GA	GD	Pts	Promotion or relegation
1	FK Vindava Ventspils	30	26	2	2	116	11	+105	80	1. liga Winners
2	SK Blāzma Rēzekne	30	25	4	1	111	11	+100	79	Qualified to Virsliga for 2008
3	FK Auda Rīga	30	20	5	5	104	31	+73	65	
4	FK Metta/LU Rīga	30	18	7	5	67	23	+44	61	
5	FK Jelgava	30	16	6	8	70	43	+27	54	
6	FK Jaunība-Parex Rīga	30	16	3	11	71	51	+20	51	
7	FK Kauguri-PBLC Jūrmala	30	14	4	12	67	55	+12	46	
8	RFS/Flaminko Rīga	30	14	2	14	60	62	−2	44	
9	FK Zibens/Zemessardze Ilūkste	30	13	3	14	79	68	+11	42	
10	Valmieras FK	30	12	4	14	63	59	+4	40	
11	FSK Daugava-90 Rīga	30	11	6	13	51	72	−21	39	
12	FK Tukums-2000/TSS	30	11	3	16	61	75	−14	36	
13	FK Multibanka Rīga	30	6	1	23	40	99	−59	19	
14	FK Tranzīts Ventspils	30	4	4	22	29	103	−74	16	
15	FK Abuls Smiltene	30	3	2	25	22	163	−141	11	
16	FK Ilūkste/BJSS	30	2	2	26	8	93	−85	8	Relegated to lower division at the end of season

Source: RSSSF
