= Māris Smirnovs =

Latvian footballer

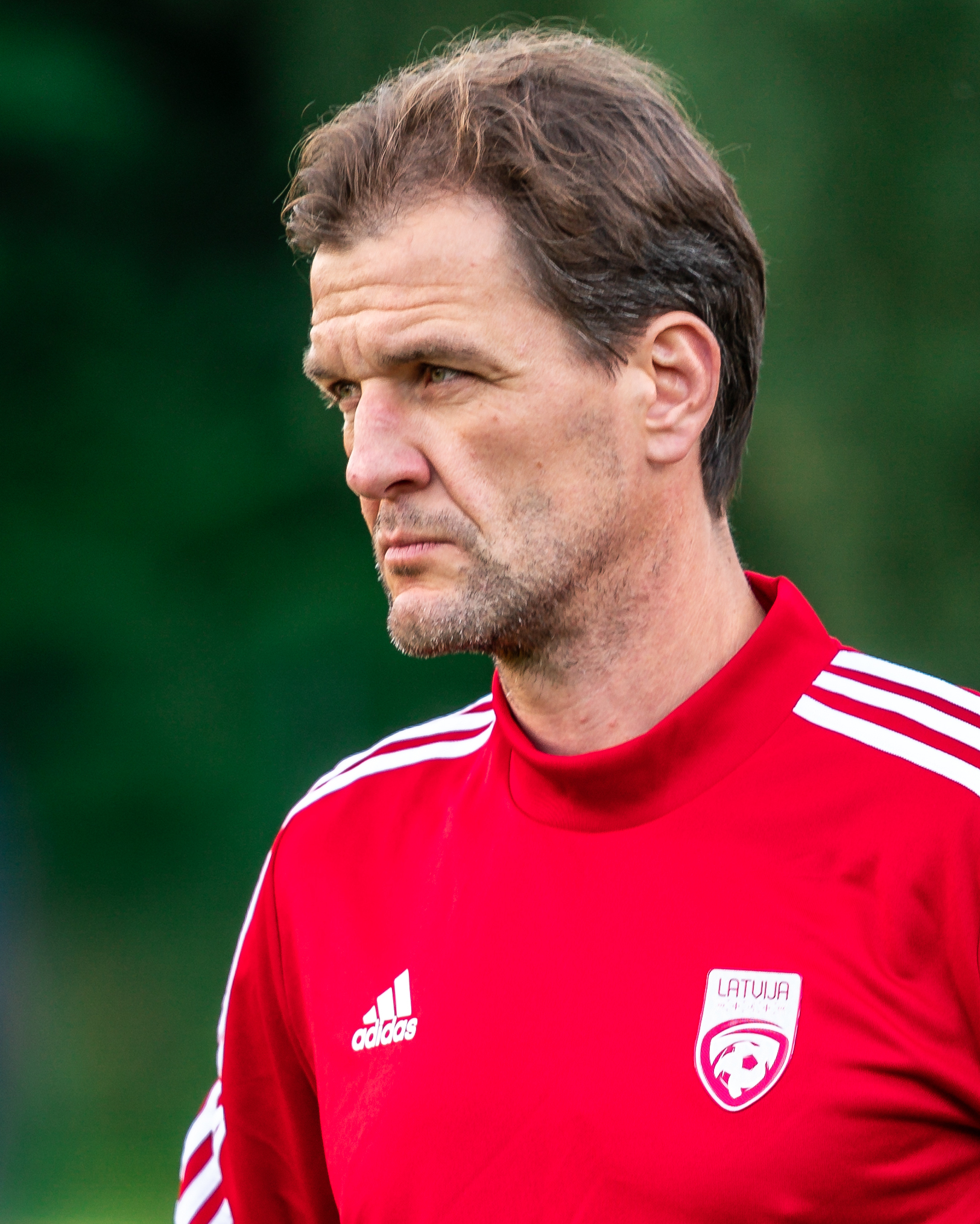
- Smirnovs in 2020

Personal information
- Full name: Māris Smirnovs
- Date of birth: 2 June 1976 (age 50)
- Place of birth: Daugavpils, Latvian SSR, Soviet Union
- Height: 1.86 m (6 ft 1 in)
- Position: Defender

Team information
- Current team: Latvia (fitness coach)

Youth career
- Dinaburg Daugavpils

Senior career*
| Years | Team | Apps | (Gls) |
| 1996–1997 | Dinaburg Daugavpils | 25 | (2) |
| 1997 | Daugavpils Lokomotīve | 10 | (0) |
| 1999 | Valmiera | 22 | (1) |
| 2000–2004 | Ventspils | 104 | (14) |
| 2004–2006 | Amica Wronki | 8 | (0) |
| 2006 | Ditton | 25 | (5) |
| 2006–2007 | Dinamo București | 1 | (0) |
| 2007 | Jurmala | 15 | (1) |
| 2007–2009 | Górnik Zabrze | 29 | (1) |
| 2009–2010 | FK Ventspils | 5 | (0) |
| 2010 | Tranzit | 24 | (2) |
| Total | | 268 | (26) |

International career
| 2002–2006 | Latvia | 21 | (0) |
- * Club domestic league appearances and goals

Māris Smirnovs (born 2 June 1976) is a Latvian former professional footballer who played as a defender, and is currently the fitness coach of the Latvia national team.

Smirnovs has played 22 international matches for Latvia. He debuted in 2002, and played at the Euro 2004.

Smirnovs played for Dinaburg, Valmiera, Ventspils, Amica Wronki, Ditton, Dinamo București, Górnik Zabrze, Jūrmala and Tranzit. At the conclusion of the 2010 Latvian Higher League season, Smirnovs retired from professional football.

Before the start of the 2012 Latvian First League season, Smirnovs was appointed as the assistant manager of FK Ventspils-2. In 2013, he became the assistant manager of FK Ventspils first team.

== Honours ==
Ventspils

- Latvian Cup: 2003, 2004

Dinamo București

- Liga I: 2006–07
