= Kauguri =

Kauguri may refer to:

- Kauguri, Jūrmala, a part of Jūrmala city, Latvia
- Kauguri Parish, a village in Beverīna Municipality, Latvia
