= LASD (disambiguation) =

LASD is the official abbreviation of the Los Angeles County Sheriff's Department, a US local law enforcement agency.

LASD may also refer to:

- Leechburg Area School District
- Lehighton Area School District
- Littlestown Area School District
- Lockheed Aeronautics Services Division, a part of Lockheed Corporation
- Los Altos School District
- Lufthansa Airport Services Dresden GmbH
- FK Dinamo-Rīnuži/LASD, a football club in Riga, Latvia
