= Vindava =

Vindava may refer to:

- FK Vindava, a football club in Latvia
- Ventspils, a town in Latvia named Vindava before 1917
