= Nathan Júnior =

Brazilian footballer

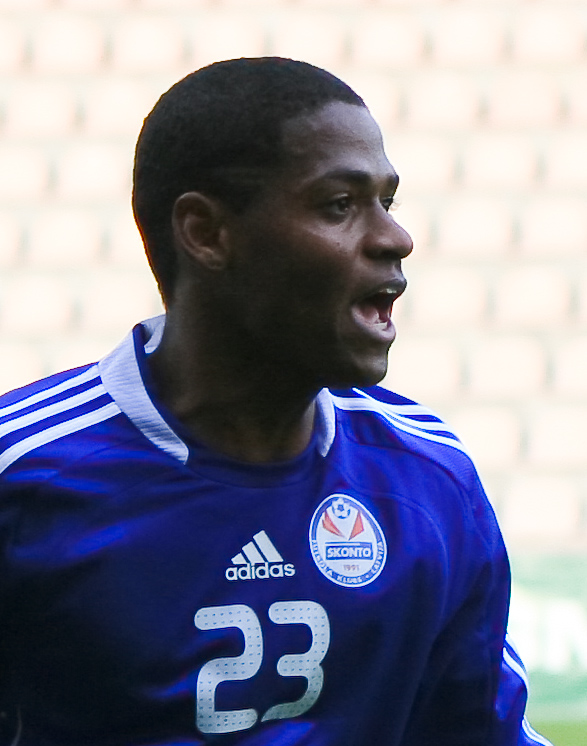
- Nathan Júnior playing for Skonto

Personal information
- Full name: Nathan Júnior Soares de Carvalho
- Date of birth: 10 March 1989 (age 37)
- Place of birth: Rio de Janeiro, Brazil
- Height: 1.84 m (6 ft 0 in)
- Position: Striker

Team information
- Current team: Telavi
- Number: 19

Youth career
- –2005: Flamengo
- 2005–2008: Anorthosis Famagusta

Senior career*
Years	Team	Apps	(Gls)
2008–2012	Skonto Riga	69	(45)
2008	→ Olimps (loan)	15	(0)
2012	Kapfenberger SV	13	(0)
2012–2013	Dila Gori	20	(5)
2013–2015	SKA-Energiya Khabarovsk	41	(15)
2015–2016	Tondela	34	(13)
2016–2017	Al-Fateh	20	(5)
2018	Tokushima Vortis	0	(0)
2019	Paços Ferreira	1	(0)
2020	Académico Viseu	3	(0)
2020–2021	Samtredia	23	(3)
2021–	Telavi	15	(1)
- * Club domestic league appearances and goals as of 16:21, 14 December 2021 (UTC)

Nathan Júnior Soares de Carvalho (born 10 March 1989) is a Brazilian professional footballer who plays as a striker for FC Telavi in Georgia.

== Club career ==
=== Early career ===
Born in Rio de Janeiro, as a teenager, Nathan Júnior played for his local club Clube de Regatas do Flamengo, and was a member of the club's system. At the age of 16 he tried to get into the first team unsuccessfully and a year later got an offer to join Anorthosis Famagusta academy in Cyprus, which was accepted by the player, and in July 2005 he joined the Cypriot side, spending the next three seasons there.

=== Skonto Riga ===
With the help of former Anorthosis Famagusta player and Latvian international Marians Pahars, Júnior was taken on trial at Skonto Riga in July 2008. He signed a four-year contract, as the trial was successful. Right after joining, Júnior found it difficult to fit into the squad, as there were many experienced players, and was soon loaned out to Olimps/RFS. He played 15 matches that season and was mainly used in the right-back position.

In December 2008, Júnior returned to Skonto Riga and was mainly used as a late-game substitute by that time club's manager Paul Ashworth. In 2009 Skonto had a lack of forwards as two of them left right before the start of the season, and Júnior was tried out as a forward. He scored twice on his new position debut against Jūrmala-VV and later on remained in that position. He played 19 games and scored 5 goals in the 2009 season and was notified as a forward in the squad for the 2010 season. He made a big surprise in the upcoming season, scoring 18 goals in 24 league matches and sharing the top-scorer's honor with Liepājas Metalurgs striker Deniss Rakels, who had also netted 18 times, respectively. In 2010 Skonto became the champions of Latvia. After the impressive season Júnior went on trials with Maccabi Haifa in Israel, Dynamo Moscow in Russia, and Energie Cottbus in Germany but didn't settle there.

At the start of the 2011 season, Júnior suffered an injury and didn't appear in the first league matches of the season. Despite lack of gaming practice, he showed his ability right after being declared fit and soon became the leading scorer of the league yet again. He was named the league's best player in July 2011. Although Skonto had a poor season and finished only in the 4th place of the Latvian Higher League, Júnior became the league's top scorer with 22 goals in 26 games. After the season, he was included in the LFF and sportacentrs.com teams of the tournament and was also named the best forward of the season.

=== Kapfenberger SV ===
At the end of 2011 Júnior went on trial with the Austrian Bundesliga club Kapfenberger SV and signed a contract with them in January 2012.

=== Tokushima Vortis ===
On 31 January 2018, Tokushima Vortis announced the signing of Nathan Júnior.

=== Paços Ferreira ===
After seven months without club, Nathan signed with Paços Ferreira on 31 January 2019 after a trial. He left the club at the end of the year.

=== Académico Viseu ===
On 31 January 2019, Nathan moved to another Portuguese club, Académico Viseu, after being without a club since leaving Paços Ferreira in the summer of 2019. However, he played only 27 minutes.

=== FC Samtredia ===
Nathan then returned to Georgia, where he signed with FC Samtredia in August 2020.

== International career ==
Nathan Júnior has not represented Brazil at any level yet. In an interview for sportacentrs.com the player admitted that he would be interested in representing Latvia, but as the Latvian law does not allow more than one citizenship, Júnior would have to waive the Brazilian passport and play in Latvia for at least five years. The player said that it would be a serious decision, but after moving to Austria this question has been put aside.

== Career statistics ==
=== Club ===
As of match played 4 December 2021

Appearances and goals by club, season and competition
Club	Season	League			National Cup		League Cup		Continental		Other		Total	
Club	Season	Division	Apps	Goals	Apps	Goals	Apps	Goals	Apps	Goals	Apps	Goals	Apps	Goals
Skonto Riga	2009	Virslīga	19	4			—		2	0	—		21	0
Skonto Riga	2010	Virslīga	24	18			—		2	0	—		26	18
Skonto Riga	2011	Virslīga	26	22	1	1	—		1	0	—		28	23
Skonto Riga	Total		69	44	1	1	—		5	0	—		75	45
Kapfenberger SV	2011–12	Austrian Bundesliga	13	1	0	0	—		—		—		13	1
Dila Gori	2012–13	Umaglesi Liga	21	7	1	3	—		—		1	0	23	10
SKA-Energia	2013–14	Russian National League	27	9	2	0	—		—		—		29	9
SKA-Energia	2014–15	Russian National League	14	6	0	0	—		—		—		14	6
SKA-Energia	Total		41	15	2	0	—		—		—		43	15
Tondela	2015–16	Primeira Liga	34	13	0	0	1	0	—		—		35	13
Al-Fateh	2016–17	Saudi Professional League	20	5	1	0	1	0	3	1	—		25	6
Tokushima Vortis	2018	J2 League	0	0	0	0	—		—		—		0	0
Paços de Ferreira	2018–19	LigaPro	1	0	—		—		—		—		1	0
Académico de Viseu	2019–20	LigaPro	3	0	0	0	—		—		—		1	0
Samtredia	2020	Erovnuli Liga	7	0	0	0	—		—		—		7	0
Samtredia	2021	Erovnuli Liga	16	3	1	0	—		—		—		17	3
Samtredia	Total		23	3	1	0	—		—		—		24	3
Telavi	2021	Erovnuli Liga	15	1	—		—		—		—		15	1
Career total			240	88	6	4	2	0	8	1	1	0	257	93

== Honours ==
Skonto Riga

- Latvian First League: 2010
- Baltic League: 2010–11; runner-up 2008

Individual

- Virsliga top scorer: 2010, 2011
