= Vladimirs Žavoronkovs =

Latvian footballer and manager

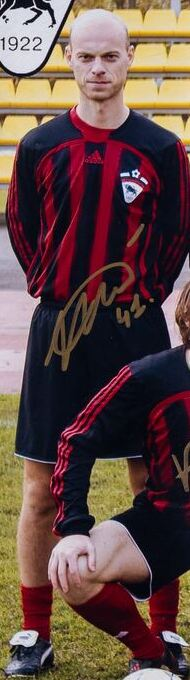

Personal information
- Full name: Vladimirs Žavoronkovs
- Date of birth: 25 November 1976 (age 49)
- Place of birth: Daugavpils, Soviet Union (now Republic of Latvia)
- Height: 1.86 m (6 ft 1 in)
- Position: Defender

Team information
- Current team: Daugava Daugavpils (assistant manager)

Senior career*
Years	Team	Apps	(Gls)
1996–1998	Dinaburg Daugavpils	59	(16)
1999–2005	FK Ventspils	149	(28)
2006	Skonto Riga	15	(0)
2007	FK Jūrmala	13	(0)
2007–2008	FK Rīga	35	(6)
2009	Dinaburg FC	4	(1)
2009–2010	FK Tauras Tauragė	11	(3)
2011–2012	Daugava Daugavpils	3	(0)
2012–2013	Ilūkstes NSS	18	(12)

International career^{‡}
2004–2005	Latvia	10	(0)

Managerial career
- 2012–: Daugava Daugavpils (assistant manager)
- * Club domestic league appearances and goals as of 30 March 2013 ‡ National team caps and goals as of 30 March 2013

Vladimirs Žavoronkovs (born 25 November 1976) is a former Latvian football defender, currently the assistant manager of Daugava Daugavpils in the Latvian Higher League.
