= 2010–11 Latvian Football Cup =

The Latvian Football Cup 2010–11 was the 69th edition of the Latvian football knockout tournament. The winners will qualify for the second qualifying round of the UEFA Europa League 2011–12.

== First round ==
| 11 July 2010 | Pļaviņas DM | 4 – 2 | FK Staiceles Bebri | Pļaviņas |
| 13:00 | Lupanovs 20'; Džeriņš 65', 75'; Zeps 89' | Report | Kovisārs 33'; Ustrisovs 69' (pen.) | Stadium: Plaviņas Stadions; Attendance: 70; Referee: Vladimirs Vinokurovs |

| 11 July 2010 | FK Smiltene BJSS | 2 – 1 | FK Ilūkste | Smiltene |
| 13:00 | | Report | | Stadium: Smiltenes Sradions; Referee: Aleksejs Loginovs |

| 14 July 2010 | Stāmeriena | 7 – 1 | FK Priekuļi | Gulbene |
| 19:00 | Šķenders 5' (pen.), 47'; Timenieks 10'; Zeičs 42' (pen.), 53', 76'; Grāvcejs 90+3' | Report | Pravarhis 81' | Stadium: Gulbenes SC Stadions; Referee: Ervīns Veļķeris |

| 14 July 2010 | Preiļu novada BJSS | 7 – 1 | FK Ērgļi | Preiļi |
| 19:00 | | Report | | Stadium: Preiļu Stadions; Referee: Andris Utināns |

| 17 July 2010 | SK Upesciems | 1 – 1 aet (5–4 p) | FK Balvu Vilki Mārupe | Upesciems |
| 17:00 | Baranovskis 7' (pen.) | Report | Macuks 32' | Stadium: Pilsētas Stadions; Attendance: 30; Referee: Vladimirs Vinokurovs |

| 18 July 2010 | SFK Varavīksne | 4 – 1 | FK Tukuma Brāļi | Liepāja |
| 17:00 | | Report | | Stadium: Daugavas Stadions (Liepāja); Referee: Ainārs Krūmiņš |

| 20 July 2010 | FK Ozolnieki | 1 – 3 | Salaspils FC | Ozolnieki |
| 19:30 | | Report | | Stadium: Ozolnieku Stadions; Referee: Ruslans Botošs |

| 22 July 2010 | FK Bauska | 5 – 2 | SK Imanta | Bauska |
| 18:30 | Ružello 7', 17'; Zomerovskis 9'; Kučinskis 22', 49' | Report | Mežals 24'; Kovtjuhs 53' | Stadium: Bauskas Stadions; Referee: Dainis Vītols |

| 25 July 2010 | FK Alūksne | 7 – 1 | FK Alberts | Alūksne |
| 17:00 | | Report | | Stadium: Alūksnes Stadions; Referee: Jurijs Kolosovs |

| 25 July 2010 | FK Valka | 1 – 0 | Jēkabpils SC/SS | Valka |
| 15:00 | | | | Stadium: Valkas Stadions; Referee: Aleksejs Loginovs |

| 26 July 2010 | FK Olaine | 1 – 0 | FK Viesulis | Olaine |
| 19:00 | | | | Stadium: Olaines Stadions; Referee: Deniss Ševčenko |

== Second round ==
| 15 August 2010 | FK Ogres SC/FK-33 | 5 – 1 | Pļaviņas DM | Ogre |
| 13:00 | | Report | | Stadium: Ogres Stadions; Referee: Ģirts Sarma |

| 15 August 2010 | Stāmeriena | 3 – 0 | FK Olaine | Gulbene |
| 18:00 | | Report | | Referee: Ervīns Veļķeris |

| 18 August 2010 | Salaspils FC | 4 – 1 | Preiļu novada BJSS | Salaspils |
| 19:00 | | Report | | Stadium: Salaspils BSS Stadions; Referee: Ervīns Veļķeris |

| 22 August 2010 | FK Balvu vilki Mārupe | 0 – 1 | SFK Varavīksne | Mārupe |
| 16:00 | | Report | | Stadium: Mārupes Stadions; Referee: Vladimirs Šteinbergs |

| 22 August 2010 | FK Alūksne | 4 – 5 | FK Smiltene BJSS | Alūksne |
| 16:00 | | Report | | Stadium: Alūksnes Stadions; Referee: Jurijs Kolosovs |

| 22 August 2010 | FK Bauska | 0 – 4 | FK Valka | Bauska |
| 16:00 | | Report | | Stadium: Bauskas Stadions; Referee: Ruslans Botošs |

== Third round ==
Into this round entered the six winners of the previous round and nine clubs from the Latvian First League. Six of the clubs were drawn into three matches before the round began to reduce the number of clubs in this round to 12. These matches took place on 29 August and 9 September 2010.

| 29 August 2010 | FK Ogres SC/FK-33 | 0 – 3 | FK Spartaks | Ogre |
| 17:00 | | Report | | Stadium: Ogres Stadions; Referee: Vitālijs Spasjonņikovs |

| 29 August 2010 | Metta-LU | 4 – 0 | SFK Varavīksne | Riga |
| 18:00 | | Report | | Stadium: Stadions Arkādija; Referee: Mareks Ķere |

| 9 September 2010 | Stāmeriena | 7 – 2 | Smiltene BJSS | Gulbene |
| 17:00 | | Report | | Stadium: Gulbenes SC Stadions; Referee: Jurijs Popovičenko |

The remaining 12 clubs were drawn together into six matches. These matches took place on 18 and 19 September 2010.

| 18 September 2010 | FB Gulbene-2005 | 5 – 1 | FC Jūrmala | Gulbene |
| 15:00 | Kamešs 19', 21', 35', 61', 69' | Report | Daņilovs 70' | Stadium: Gulbenes SC Stadions; Referee: Sergejs Braga |

| 18 September 2010 | FK Auda | 0 – 3 | FK Daugava/RFS | Ķekava |
| 16:00 | | Report | | Stadium: Audas Stadions; Referee: Ģirts Sarma |

| 18 September 2010 | Valmiera FK/BSS | 6 – 1 | FK Kuldīga | Valmiera |
| 16:00 | | Report | | Stadium: J.Daliņa Stadions; Referee: Jevgēnijs Vasjukovs |

| 18 September 2010 | Metta-LU | 7 – 3 | FK Tukums 2000 | Riga |
| 18:00 | | Report | | Stadium: Stadions Arkādija; Referee: Vitālijs Poļakovs |

| 19 September 2010 | FK Valka | 2 – 3 | Salaspils FC | Valka |
| 16:00 | | Report | | Stadium: Valkas Stadions; Referee: Aleksejs Loginovs |

| 19 September 2010 | FK Spartaks | 4 – 1 | Stāmeriena | Jūrmala |
| 16:00 | | Report | | Stadium: Slokas Stadions; Referee: Mareks Ķere |

== Round of 16 ==
Entering this round were the six winners from the previous round and the ten clubs from the Latvian Higher League. The draw for this round occurred on 20 September 2010. These matches were played between 26 September 2010 and 20 October 2010.

| 26 September 2010 | JFK Olimps/RFS | 0 – 0 aet (6–7 p) | FK Jūrmala-VV | Riga |
| 14:00 | | Report | | Stadium: Daugavas Stadions; Attendance: 100; Referee: Sergejs Braga |
| | Penalties |
| | Klimčovs (penalty scored); Gongadze (penalty scored); Daņilovs (penalty scored); Stuglis (penalty scored); Siņicins (penalty scored); Omeļjanovičs (penalty scored); Broders (penalty missed) | | (penalty scored) Golubevs; (penalty scored) Krjauklis; (penalty scored) Macions; (penalty scored) Žatkins; (penalty scored) Zeņkovs; (penalty scored) Agafonovs; (penalty scored) Stepanovs |

| 26 September 2010 | FK Daugava/RFS | 3 – 1 | FC Tranzit | Riga |
| 14:00 | Ļahovs 18' (o.g.); Hlibovs 18'; Priedēns 90+2' | Report | Savrups 21' | Stadium: LU Stadions; Attendance: 78; Referee: Andris Treimanis |

| 26 September 2010 | FB Gulbene-2005 | 2 – 3 | Skonto FC | Gulbene |
| 15:00 | Kamešs 35'; Sato 89' | Report | Perepļotkins 21'; Turkovs 27'; Cauņa 62' | Stadium: Gulbenes SC Stadions; Attendance: 2150; Referee: Vadims Čerņikovs |

| 26 September 2010 | SK Blāzma Rēzekne | 0 – 1 | FK Liepājas Metalurgs | Rēzekne |
| 15:30 | | Report | Prohorenkovs 88' | Stadium: Sporta Aģentūras Stadions; Attendance: 300; Referee: Vadims Direktorenko |

| Team 1 | Score | Team 2 |
|---|---|---|
| FK Salaspils | 0–10 | Daugava Daugavpils |
| Valmieras | 0–0 (a.e.t.); 7–6 (pen) | Jaunība Rīga |
| FK Spartaks | 1–2 | Ventspils |
| Metta-LU | 1–2 | Jelgava |

== Quarterfinals ==
The eight winners from the previous round compete in this round. These matches were played between 19 March 2011 and 26 March 2011.

| Team 1 | Score | Team 2 |
|---|---|---|
| FK Jūrmala-VV | 3–1 | Valmieras |
| Daugava Rīga | 1–2 | Ventspils |
| Skonto | 0–0 (a.e.t.); 0–3 (pen) | Daugava Daugavpils |
| Jelgava | 0–1 | Liepājas Metalurgs |

== Semifinals ==
The four winners from the previous round compete in this round. These matches were played 30 March 2011.

| Team 1 | Score | Team 2 |
|---|---|---|
| Daugava Daugavpils | 0–2 | Ventspils |
| Liepājas Metalurgs | 2–1 (a.e.t.) | FK Jūrmala-VV |

== Final ==
15 May 2011

| Ventspils | 3 – 1 | Liepājas Metalurgs |

Skonto Stadium, Riga
