= FK Kauguri Jūrmala =

Former Latvian football club

FK Kauguri
- Full name: Futbola klubs Kauguri / PBLC
- Founded: 2008
- Dissolved: 2010
- Ground: Kauguru vidusskolas stadions Jūrmala, Latvia; Slokas stadions (former)
- League: 1. līga
- Website: fkkauguri.lv

FK Kauguri/PBLC Jūrmala was a Latvian football club located in Kauguri, Jūrmala Jūrmala.

The clubs origins come from the youth academy JFC Kauguri (Jūrmalas futbola centrs "Kauguri"), founded in 1999, before it merged with FK Multibanka Rīga in 2008 to form JFC Kauguri/Multibanka. Later, with the departure of the main sponsor, Multibanka bank, and the arrival of a new one - construction company PBLC - the name was changed to FK Kauguri-PBLC. The team played most of its Latvian First League matches at Sloka Stadium or, at times, the Kauguri Secondary School stadium.

The club was dissolved in 2010 due to a failure to find partners and sponsors, likely due to the PBLC company entering administration and later going bankrupt.

Former crest as JFC Kauguri Jūrmala

== Current squad ==
Note: Flags indicate national team as defined under FIFA eligibility rules; some limited exceptions apply. Players may hold more than one non-FIFA nationality.

No.	Pos.	Nation	Player
—		LVA	Edgars Dmitrijevs
—		LVA	Fjodors Ļebedevs
—		LVA	Jevgēņijs Smirnovs
—		LVA	Iļja Mamatovs
—		LVA	Jevgēņijs Dmitrijevs
—		LVA	Pāvels Skaļenko
—		LVA	Mihails Nosiks
—		LVA	Deniss Radzvilavičus
—		LVA	Vitālijs Morgačevs
—		LVA	Pāvels Petranovs
—		LVA	Andrejs Panasjuks
—		LVA	Mihails Poļakovs
—		LVA	Ruslans Seļezņovs
—		LVA	Romāns Kuzmins
—		LVA	Žans Monneļs
—		LVA	Oļegs Jākobsons
—		LVA	Andrejs Smirnovs
