= Igor Gamula =

Ukrainian-Russian footballer and coach (1960–2021)

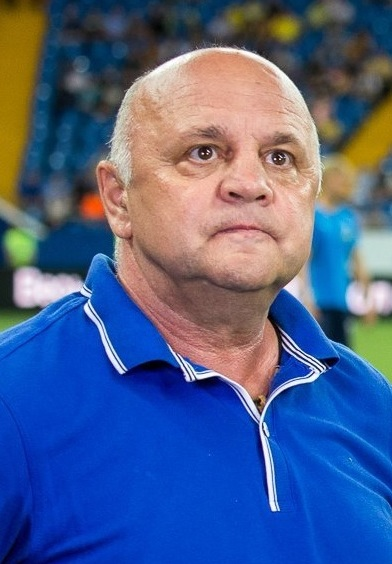
- Gamula in 2019

Personal information
- Full name: Igor Vasilyevich Gamula
- Date of birth: 17 February 1960
- Place of birth: Voroshylovsk, Ukrainian SSR, Soviet Union
- Date of death: 8 December 2021 (aged 61)
- Height: 1.71 m (5 ft 7 in)
- Position: Midfielder

Senior career*
Years	Team	Apps	(Gls)
1978–1979	Zorya Voroshylovhrad	17	(1)
1980–1981	SKA Rostov-on-Don	46	(8)
1982–1984	Zorya Voroshylovhrad	82	(7)
1985–1988	Rostselmash	31	(0)
1989	Atommash Volgodonsk	11	(2)
1990–1992	Krystal Kherson	67	(18)
Total		254	(36)

Managerial career
- 1992: Krystal Kherson
- 2000: Tavriya Novotroitske
- 2001–2002: Chernomorets Novorossiysk (assistant)
- 2002: Chernomorets Novorossiysk
- 2002: Chernomorets Novorossiysk (assistant)
- 2002–2003: Chernomorets Novorossiysk
- 2003: Chernomorets Novorossiysk (assistant)
- 2003: Chernomorets Novorossiysk
- 2003: Chernomorets Novorossiysk (assistant)
- 2003–2004: Chernomorets Novorossiysk
- 2005–2006: Chernomorets Novorossiysk
- 2007: Daugava Daugavpils
- 2008: Daugava Daugavpils
- 2009: Dinaburg
- 2009–2011: Zakarpattia Uzhhorod
- 2011–2017: Rostov (reserves)
- 2014: Rostov
- 2018: SKA Rostov-on-Don
- 2019–2020: Rostov (scout)
- * Club domestic league appearances and goals

Igor Vasilyevich Gamula (Russian: Игорь Васильевич Гамула, Ukrainian: Ігор Васильович Гамула; 17 February 1960 – 8 December 2021) was a Ukrainian and Russian professional football coach and player. He was also a scout for FC Rostov. He made his debut in the Soviet Top League in 1978 for FC Zorya Voroshylovhrad. Gamula had Ukrainian and Russian citizenship.

== Managerial career ==
Gamula was appointed manager of FC Rostov on 25 September 2014 following the resignation of Miodrag Božović.

Following FC Rostov's 1–0 win over FC Ural, Gamula became involved in a racism row following question to the possibility of Rostov signing Benoit Angbwa, saying that six "dark-skinned players" was sufficient for the team. On 12 November Gamula was handed a five-game ban following his remarks.

On 18 December, Gamula was appointed Rostov's youth team manager, with Kurban Berdyev replacing him as manager of the first team.

Gamula died on 8 December 2021, at the age of 61.

== Honours ==
- Soviet Cup 1981 (FC SKA Rostov-on-Don)
