= Ivan Tabanov =

Moldovan footballer and manager

Personal information
- Date of birth: 7 August 1966 (age 60)
- Place of birth: Moldova
- Height: 1.68 m (5 ft 6 in)
- Position: Defender

Team information
- Current team: Sucleia (manager)

Senior career*
Years	Team	Apps	(Gls)
1992–1994	Amocom Chișinău		
1994–1995	Bugeac Comrat		
1995–2001	Constructorul Chișinău	20	(0)

International career
1998–1999	Moldova	4	(1)

Managerial career
- 2006–2007: Zimbru Chișinău
- 2009–2011: Zimbru Chișinău
- 2012–2013: FC Daugava
- 2014: Tauras Tauragė
- 2014: FC Daugava
- 2017–2020: Saxan
- 2020–2022: Sucleia
- 2022-2024: FC Petrocub Hîncești
- * Club domestic league appearances and goals

Ivan Tabanov (born 7 August 1966) is a Moldovan football manager and former player who is currently the manager of FC Sucleia.

In October 2014 Ivan Tabanov was interrogated and arrested by the Latvian State Police, being accused of match fixing. Being a suspect in the ongoing investigation, he was disqualified from the Latvian Higher League for an undetermined period of time by the Latvian Football Federation.

In August 2016, he was appointed sporting director of Saxan. In January 2017, he became the head coach of the club. In July 2020, he was appointed head coach of Sucleia.

== International goal ==
Scores and results list Moldova's goal tally first.

No	Date	Venue	Opponent	Score	Result	Competition
1.	6 June 1998	Stadionul Ilie Oană, Ploieşti, Romania	Romania	1–5	1–5	Friendly match
