= Oļegs Malašenoks =

Latvian footballer (born 1986)

Personal information
- Full name: Oļegs Malašenoks
- Date of birth: 27 April 1986 (age 40)
- Place of birth: Riga, Latvian SSR, Soviet Union (now Republic of Latvia)
- Height: 1.84 m (6 ft 0 in)
- Position: Striker

Team information
- Current team: AFA Olaine

Senior career*
Years	Team	Apps	(Gls)
2001–2003	Multibanka Rīga	34	(13)
2004–2008	FK Jūrmala	81	(24)
2009	Ventspils	0	(0)
2009	→ Tranzit (loan)	24	(5)
2009–2010	Hibernians	14	(4)
2010–2011	FK Jelgava	37	(17)
2011–2012	Volgar-Gazprom	0	(0)
2012–2013	FK Jelgava	18	(1)
2013	FC Jūrmala	11	(4)
2013–2017	FK Jelgava	89	(17)
2017–	AFA Olaine	?	(?)

International career
2005–2008	Latvia U21	14	(3)
2010	Latvia	1	(0)
- * Club domestic league appearances and goals as of 26 June 2017

Oļegs Malašenoks (born 27 April 1986 in Riga) is a Latvian professional footballer who currently plays as a striker for AFA Olaine.

== Club career ==
Oļegs Malašenoks was born in Riga, as a youth player he played for his local club Multibanka Rīga in the Latvian First League. Scoring 13 goals in 34 games in a period of 2 seasons, the youngster was soon signed by the Latvian Higher League club FK Jūrmala in 2004. Playing there for the next 4 seasons, Malašenoks managed to become one of the team's leaders, and in 2008 he was the second top scorer of the championship with 13 goals in 29 matches, just one goal behind the leader Vīts Rimkus.

In 2008 his contract with FK Jūrmala expired and Skonto Riga were keen on signing him, but the player himself decided to look for a club abroad. In the winter transfer period of 2009 Malašenoks went on trial with the Bulgarian club Cherno More Varna and Scottish side Dundee, but didn't stay with these teams and returned to Latvia. On 11 February he signed a one-year contract with FK Ventspils. Before the start of the season Malašenoks was loaned to Tranzit - another club from the city of Ventspils. He played there until September 2009, when an offer from the Maltese Premier League appeared. He joined Hibernians on trial and signed a contract with them until the end of the season on 25 September 2009. He played 14 matches and scored 4 goals in Malta.

In 2010, when his contract with the Maltese side had already ended, Malašenoks returned to Latvia and joined the higher league debutant club FK Jelgava. He was voted the best player of the championship in May. With 11 goals in 23 games Malašenoks was the club's top scorer in the 2010 season. In 2011, he was once again voted as the player of the month - this time July. That season Malašenoks added 6 more goals to his name in 14 matches and received a contract offer from Russia in mid-summer. Despite being injured, he signed a two-year contract with Volgar-Gazprom Astrakhan on 31 August 2011. Because of the injury, he didn't play until the end of the year.

In August 2012 Malašenoks re-joined his previous club FK Jelgava. He managed to score only 1 goal in 18 league matches for the club. In March 2013 Malašenoks moved to the Latvian Higher League club FC Jūrmala. Scoring 4 goals in 11 matches, Malašenoks moved back to Jelgava in July 2013, as the club was in a need of a forward and offered him a contract. In 2014 Malašenoks helped Jelgava win the Latvian Cup and attain bronze medals of the domestic championship for the first time in the club's history.

== International career ==
Malašenoks made his debut for Latvia national team in the Baltic Cup match against Lithuania on 18 June 2010.

== Honours ==
=== Multibanka Rīga ===
- Latvian First League runner-up
  - 2003

=== FK Jelgava ===
- Latvian Cup winner
  - 2010, 2014
