= 1998 UEFA European Under-21 Championship qualification =

Football tournament qualification stage

The 1998 UEFA European Under-21 Championship qualification began in 1996. The final tournament was held in 1998 in Romania.

The 46 national teams were divided into nine groups (eight groups of 5 + one group of 6). The records of the nine group winners were compared, and the eighth and ninth ranked teams played-off against each other for the eight quarter finals spot. One of the eight quarter-finalist were then chosen to host the remaining fixtures.

== Qualifying groups ==
=== Draw ===
The allocation of teams into qualifying groups was based on that of 1998 FIFA World Cup qualification with several changes, reflecting the absence of some nations:

- Groups 1, 2, 4, 5 and 7 featured the same nations
- Group 3 did not include Azerbaijan, but included France (who did not participate in World Cup qualification)
- Group 6 did not include Faroe Islands
- Group 8 did not include Liechtenstein
- Group 9 did not include Northern Ireland

=== Group 1 ===
Team	Pld	W	D	L	GF	GA	GD	Pts
Greece	8	5	1	2	12	7	+5	16
Denmark	8	5	1	2	16	9	+7	16
Croatia	8	4	0	4	13	9	+4	12
Slovenia	8	3	0	5	9	13	−4	9
Bosnia and Herzegovina	8	1	2	5	6	18	−12	5

- Greece 0–2 Slovenia
- Greece 1–0 Bosnia & Herz.
- Slovenia 0–3 Denmark
- Bosnia & Herz. 3–1 Croatia
- Denmark 1–3 Greece
- Slovenia 2–0 Bosnia & Herz.
- Croatia 0–1 Greece
- Croatia 2–0 Denmark
- Bosnia & Herz. 0–0 Greece
- Croatia 2–0 Slovenia
- Greece 2–0 Croatia
- Denmark 2–1 Slovenia
- Denmark 5–0 Bosnia & Herz.
- Bosnia & Herz. 1–1 Denmark
- Croatia 6–1 Bosnia & Herz.
- Slovenia 1–3 Greece
- Denmark 1–0 Croatia
- Bosnia & Herz. 1–2 Slovenia
- Greece 2–3 Denmark
- Slovenia 1–2 Croatia

- Greece qualify as group winners

=== Group 2 ===
Team	Pld	W	D	L	GF	GA	GD	Pts
England	8	5	3	0	7	1	+6	18
Georgia	8	3	3	2	10	10	0	12
Italy	8	3	2	3	17	6	+11	11
Poland	8	1	5	2	10	15	−5	8
Moldova	8	1	1	6	5	17	−12	4

- Moldova 0–2 England
- Moldova 0–3 Italy
- England 0–0 Poland
- Italy 6–0 Georgia
- Georgia 0–1 England
- Poland 1–3 Moldova
- England 1–0 Italy
- Italy 6–0 Moldova
- Poland 1–1 Italy
- England 0–0 Georgia
- Italy 1–1 Poland
- Poland 1–1 England
- Georgia 1–0 Moldova
- Poland 2–2 Georgia
- England 1–0 Moldova
- Georgia 2–0 Italy
- Moldova 0–0 Georgia
- Moldova 2–3 Poland
- Georgia 5–1 Poland
- Italy 0–1 England

- England qualify as group winners

=== Group 3 ===
Team	Pld	W	D	L	GF	GA	GD	Pts
Norway	8	5	2	1	22	10	+12	17
France	8	4	3	1	13	8	+5	15
Switzerland	8	2	3	3	13	17	−4	9
Finland	8	2	3	3	8	10	−2	9
Hungary	8	1	1	6	9	20	−11	4

- Norway 1–1 France
- Hungary 0–1 Finland
- Finland 1–1 Switzerland
- Norway 4–1 Hungary
- Switzerland 3–7 Norway
- France 2–0 Hungary
- France 1–0 Switzerland
- Norway 3–0 Finland
- Switzerland 4–1 Hungary
- France 2–1 Finland
- Finland 1–1 France
- Hungary 2–0 Norway
- Hungary 2–2 Switzerland
- Finland 0–0 Norway
- Switzerland 2–1 Finland
- Hungary 2–4 France
- Norway 4–1 Switzerland
- Finland 3–1 Hungary
- Switzerland 0–0 France
- France 2–3 Norway

- Norway qualify as group winners

=== Group 4 ===
Team	Pld	W	D	L	GF	GA	GD	Pts
Sweden	10	9	0	1	30	6	+24	27
Austria	10	6	2	2	21	12	+9	20
Belarus	10	6	2	2	17	7	+10	20
Latvia	10	2	2	6	6	18	−12	8
Scotland	10	2	1	7	10	20	−10	7
Estonia	10	1	1	8	4	25	−21	4

	(Austria)	(Belarus)	(Estonia)	(Latvia)	(Scotland)	(Sweden)
Austria	—	2–0	7–1	0–0	4–0	0–4
Belarus	1–1	—	3–1	2–0	1–0	0–1
Estonia	0–1	1–1	—	0–1	0–1	0–2
Latvia	1–3	0–2	0–1	—	0–0	0–2
Scotland	1–2	0–3	4–0	2–4	—	1–4
Sweden	4–1	1–3	5–0	5–0	2–1	—

- Sweden qualify as group winners

=== Group 5 ===
Team	Pld	W	D	L	GF	GA	GD	Pts
Russia	8	6	1	1	27	7	+20	19
Israel	8	5	2	1	17	9	+8	17
Bulgaria	8	4	0	4	16	12	+4	12
Cyprus	8	3	1	4	16	15	+1	10
Luxembourg	8	0	0	8	3	36	−33	0

- Russia 2–1 Cyprus
- Israel 2–0 Bulgaria
- Israel 1–0 Russia
- Luxembourg 0–4 Bulgaria
- Luxembourg 1–7 Russia
- Cyprus 1–1 Israel
- Cyprus 3–0 Bulgaria
- Israel 2–1 Luxembourg
- Cyprus 0–4 Russia
- Luxembourg 0–5 Israel
- Bulgaria 3–1 Cyprus
- Russia 8–0 Luxembourg
- Israel 4–3 Cyprus
- Bulgaria 3–0 Luxembourg
- Russia 1–1 Israel
- Bulgaria 3–1 Israel
- Luxembourg 1–2 Cyprus
- Bulgaria 1–2 Russia
- Russia 3–2 Bulgaria
- Cyprus 5–0 Luxembourg

- Russia qualify as group winners

=== Group 6 ===
Team	Pld	W	D	L	GF	GA	GD	Pts
Spain	8	7	1	0	18	6	+12	22
FR Yugoslavia	8	6	0	2	14	3	+11	18
Slovakia	8	3	1	4	16	10	+6	10
Czech Republic	8	3	0	5	13	13	0	9
Malta	8	0	0	8	0	29	−29	0

- Yugoslavia 1–0 Malta
- Czech Rep. 4–0 Malta
- Slovakia 3–0 Malta
- Czech Rep. 1–2 Spain
- Yugoslavia 3–0 Czech Rep.
- Spain 1–1 Slovakia
- Spain 1–0 Yugoslavia
- Malta 0–3 Spain
- Spain 1–0 Malta
- Malta 0–6 Slovakia
- Czech Rep. 0–1 Yugoslavia
- Yugoslavia 1–2 Spain
- Yugoslavia 1–0 Slovakia
- Spain 4–0 Czech Rep.
- Slovakia 0–1 Czech Rep.
- Slovakia 0–1 Yugoslavia
- Malta 0–5 Czech Rep.
- Slovakia 3–4 Spain
- Czech Rep. 2–3 Slovakia
- Malta 0–6 Yugoslavia

- Spain qualify as group winners

=== Group 7 ===
Team	Pld	W	D	L	GF	GA	GD	Pts
Netherlands	8	6	1	1	26	5	+21	19
Turkey	8	5	0	3	16	8	+8	15
Belgium	8	4	1	3	16	12	+4	13
Wales	8	4	0	4	9	9	0	12
San Marino	8	0	0	8	2	35	−33	0

- San Marino 0–3 Wales
- Wales 4–0 San Marino
- Belgium 1–2 Turkey
- Wales 0–2 Netherlands
- San Marino 1–5 Belgium
- Netherlands 0–1 Wales
- Turkey 3–0 San Marino
- Wales 0–3 Turkey
- Belgium 2–2 Netherlands
- Netherlands 6–0 San Marino
- Wales 1–0 Belgium
- Turkey 0–1 Netherlands
- Turkey 1–2 Belgium
- San Marino 0–7 Netherlands
- Belgium 3–0 San Marino
- Turkey 3–0 Wales
- Netherlands 5–2 Belgium
- San Marino 1–4 Turkey
- Netherlands 3–0 Turkey
- Belgium 1–0 Wales

- Netherlands qualify as group winners

=== Group 8 ===
Team	Pld	W	D	L	GF	GA	GD	Pts
Romania	8	8	0	0	18	4	+14	24
Iceland	8	4	1	3	10	10	0	13
Republic of Ireland	8	3	0	5	11	7	+4	9
Lithuania	8	3	0	5	8	12	−4	9
Macedonia	8	1	1	6	3	17	−14	4

- Iceland 2–0 R.Macedonia
- Romania 2–1 Lithuania
- Lithuania 0–3 Iceland
- Ireland 4–0 R.Macedonia
- Iceland 2–3 Romania
- Ireland 0–1 Iceland
- R.Macedonia 0–1 Romania
- Lithuania 1–2 Romania
- R.Macedonia 0–4 Ireland
- Romania 1–0 Ireland
- R.Macedonia 1–1 Iceland
- Iceland 0–2 Lithuania
- Ireland 2–0 Lithuania
- Romania 3–0 R.Macedonia
- Iceland 1–0 Ireland
- Lithuania 1–0 R.Macedonia
- Lithuania 2–1 Ireland
- Romania 4–0 Iceland
- Ireland 0–2 Romania
- R.Macedonia 2–1 Lithuania

- Romania qualify as group winners

=== Group 9 ===
Team	Pld	W	D	L	GF	GA	GD	Pts
Germany	8	6	2	0	20	3	+17	20
Ukraine	8	5	1	2	14	4	+10	16
Portugal	8	4	2	2	20	11	+9	14
Albania	8	1	1	6	6	19	−13	4
Armenia	8	1	0	7	8	31	−23	3

- Armenia 3–4 Portugal
- Ukraine 1–0 Portugal
- Albania 2–4 Portugal
- Armenia 0–1 Germany
- Albania 3–2 Armenia
- Portugal 1–0 Ukraine
- Portugal 1–2 Germany
- Albania 0–3 Ukraine
- Albania 0–4 Germany
- Germany 2–0 Ukraine
- Ukraine 7–0 Armenia
- Ukraine 1–1 Germany
- Portugal 1–1 Albania
- Ukraine 1–0 Albania
- Portugal 8–1 Armenia
- Germany 1–1 Portugal
- Armenia 2–0 Albania
- Germany 7–0 Armenia
- Armenia 0–1 Ukraine
- Germany 2–0 Albania

- Germany qualify as group winners

=== Ranking of group winners ===
Grp	Team	Pld	W	D	L	GF	GA	GD	Pts
8	Romania	6	6	0	0	14	4	+10	18
6	Spain	6	5	1	0	14	6	+8	16
4	Sweden	6	5	0	1	18	4	+14	15
3	Norway	6	4	2	0	18	7	+11	14
9	Germany	6	4	2	0	12	3	+9	14
7	Netherlands	6	4	1	1	13	5	+8	13
5	Russia	6	4	1	1	12	6	+6	13
1	Greece	6	4	0	2	11	7	+4	12
2	England	6	3	3	0	4	1	+3	12

List of qualifying group winners. Teams 1–7 qualify automatically. Teams 8 & 9 play-off for the eighth spot. Only results between top four teams in group are used.

== Qualifying play-off ==
13 November 1997

Greece	2–0	England
Dellas 78'; Liberopoulos 90' (pen.)	Report

Theodoros Vardinogiannis Stadium, Heraklion
Attendance: 4,000
Referee: Juan Fernández Marin (Spain)

17 December 1997

England	4–2	Greece
Heskey 21', 34'; Owen 60'; Hall 78'	Report	Konstantinidis 28'; Hall 30' (o.g.)

Carrow Road, Norwich
Attendance: 14,114
Referee: Éric Blareau (Belgium)

4–4 on aggregate, Greece won on away goals rule.

== See also ==
- 1998 UEFA European Under-21 Championship
