= Nikolajs Poļakovs =

Latvian footballer

Personal information
- Full name: Nikolajs Poļakovs
- Date of birth: 2 July 1975 (age 51)
- Place of birth: Ventspils, Latvia
- Position: Defender

Senior career*
| Years | Team | Apps | (Gls) |
| 1998–1999 | FK Ventspils | ? | |
| 2000 | Policijas FK | ? | |
| 2001–2003 | FK Rīga | ? | |
| 2004 | FK Jūrmala | ? | |
| 2005 | Venta Kuldīga | ? | |
| 2005–2006 | Ditton Daugavpils | ? | |
| 2007 | FK Jūrmala | ? | |
| 2007– | Daugava Daugavpils | ? | |

International career
| 1992-1997 | Latvia U21 | 16 | (3) |
| 1998-2000 | Latvia | 14 | (0) |
- * Club domestic league appearances and goals

Nikolajs Poļakovs (born 2 July 1975) was a football defender from Latvia.

== Playing career ==
| 1998 | (Latvia) FK Ventspils | LMT Virslīga 1st level | unknown* |
| 1999 | (Latvia) FK Ventspils | LMT Virslīga 1st level | unknown |
| 2000 | (Latvia) Policijas FK | LMT Virslīga 1st level | unknown |
| 2001 | (Latvia) FK Rīga | LMT Virslīga 1st level | unknown |
| 2002 | (Latvia) FK Rīga | LMT Virslīga 1st level | unknown |
| 2003 | (Latvia) FK Rīga | LMT Virslīga 1st level | unknown |
| 2004 | (Latvia) FK Jūrmala | LMT Virslīga 1st level | unknown |
| 2005 | (Latvia) FK Venta Kuldīga | LMT Virslīga 1st level | unknown |
| ---- | (Latvia) FC Ditton Daugavpils | LMT Virslīga 1st level | unknown |
| 2006 | (Latvia) FC Ditton Daugavpils | LMT Virslīga 1st level | unknown |
| 2007 | (Latvia) FK Jūrmala | LMT Virslīga 1st level | unknown |
| ---- | (Latvia) FK Daugava Daugavpils | LMT Virslīga 1st level | unknown |

* - played games and goals
