= Uladzimir Vostrykaw =

Belarusian footballer (1976–2025)

Personal information
- Full name: Uladzimir Mikalayevich Vostrykaw
- Date of birth: 21 February 1976
- Date of death: 11 February 2025 (aged 48)
- Height: 1.82 m (6 ft 0 in)
- Position: Midfielder

Youth career
- SDYuShOR-5 Minsk

Senior career*
Years	Team	Apps	(Gls)
1993–1996	Dinamo Minsk	32	(2)
1997	Chernomorets Novorossiysk	22	(2)
1998–2001	Dinamo Minsk	52	(9)
2000	→ Belshina Bobruisk (loan)	12	(4)
2001	→ Tom Tomsk (loan)	6	(0)
2001	→ Belshina Bobruisk (loan)	10	(1)
2002	Belshina Bobruisk	10	(2)
2003–2005	Torpedo-SKA Minsk	57	(4)
2005–2006	Vitebsk	28	(0)
2007–2008	Lokomotiv Minsk	28	(0)
2010	Zvezda-BGU Minsk	30	(1)

International career
1995–1997	Belarus U21	13	(3)

Managerial career
- 2014: Zvezda-BGU Minsk (assistant)
- 2015–2025: Energetik-BGU Minsk (youth, reserves)
- * Club domestic league appearances and goals

Uladzimir Mikalayevich Vostrykaw (Belarusian: Уладзімір Мікалаевіч Вострыкаў; Russian: Владимир Николаевич Остриков, Vladimir Nikolayevich Ostrikov; 21 February 1976 – 11 February 2025) was a Belarusian football player and coach.

Vostrykaw died on 11 February 2025, at the age of 48.

== Honours ==
Dinamo Minsk

- Belarusian Premier League: 1993–94, 1994–95, 1995
- Belarusian Cup: 1993–94

Belshina Bobruisk

- Belarusian Premier League: 2001
- Belarusian Cup: 2000–01
