= Igor Kichigin =

Uzbekistani football coach and former player

Personal information
- Full name: Igor Yuryevich Kichigin
- Date of birth: 23 November 1969 (age 56)
- Place of birth: Bukhara, Uzbek SSR, Soviet Union
- Height: 1.79 m (5 ft 10 1/2 in)
- Position: Defender

Team information
- Current team: FK Ventspils (head coach)

Senior career*
Years	Team	Apps	(Gls)
1990–1991	FC Nuravshon Bukhara	52	(6)
1991	FC Zarafshon Navoi	12	(0)
1992	FC Fakel Voronezh	12	(0)
1993	FC Temp Shepetivka	7	(1)
1993	FC Sitora Bukhara	14	(3)
1993–1995	FC Nuravshon Bukhara	57	(11)
1995–1997	Neftchi FK	32	(3)
1997–1998	Buxoro FK	44	(4)
2000	Buxoro FK	23	(0)
2001	FK Dinamo Samarqand	5	(0)
2001–2002	FC Diana Volzhsk	42	(0)
2003	FK Andijan	11	(0)
2003	FC Dustlik	15	(0)
2004	FC Izhevsk	18	(0)
2004	FC Serpukhov (amateur)		

International career
1996	Uzbekistan	1	(0)

Managerial career
- 2006: FK Ditton Daugavpils (assistant)
- 2009–2010: FC Tranzit
- 2011: FK Ventspils-2
- 2021–: FK Ventspils
- * Club domestic league appearances and goals

Igor Kichigin (Russian: Игорь Юрьевич Кичигин; born 23 November 1969) is an Uzbekistani football coach and a former player who is the manager of Latvian club FK Ventspils.

== Honours ==
Nuravshon Bukhara

- Uzbek League runner-up: 1994

Neftchi

- Uzbek League champion: 1995
- Uzbek Cup winner: 1996
