= Kauguri, Jūrmala =

Neighbourhood of Jūrmala, Latvia

Coordinates: 56.9594°N 23.6089°E

Kauguri
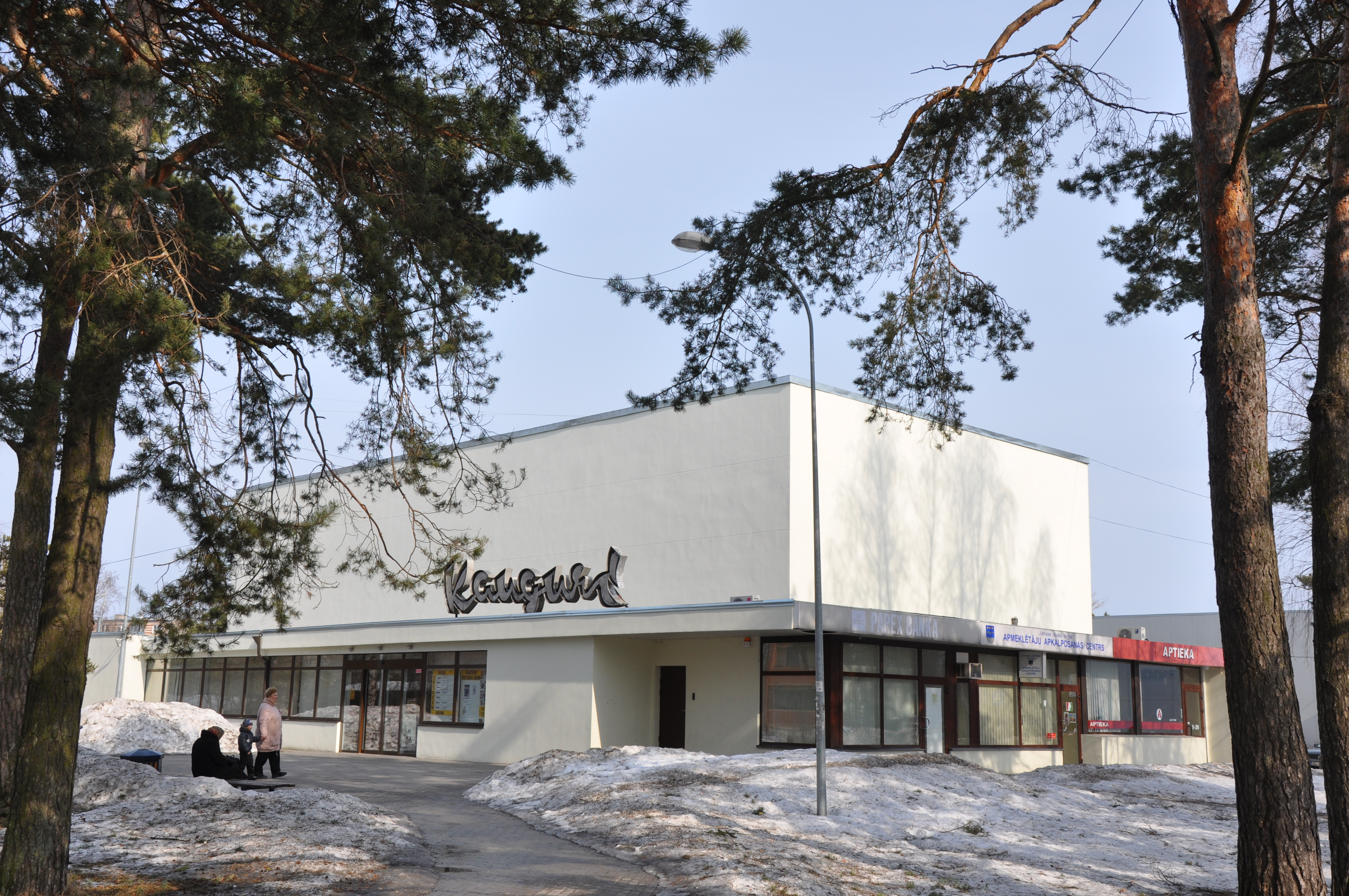
- Kauguri Cultural Centre

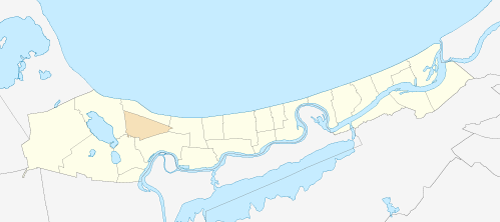
- Location in Jūrmala
- Country: Latvia
- City: Jūrmala

Area
  - Total: 3.4 km^{2} (1.3 sq mi)
- Elevation: 3 m (9.8 ft)

Population (2008)
  - Total: 20,585
  - Density: 6,054.4/km^{2} (15,681/sq mi)

Kauguri is a neighbourhood of the city of Jūrmala, Latvia, located in the city's western part between the neighborhoods of Sloka and Kaugurciems. Kauguri has the highest concentration of Soviet-built high-rise residential apartment buildings of any neighborhood in Jūrmala.

== History ==
During the 17th century, the area was called Kaugurciems and was developed into a small merchant port of the Duchy of Courland and Semigallia. This changed when on 1o0 May 1783 the Duchy was forced to cede the Sloka District, which included Kaugurciems, to the Russian Empire.

During the Latvian War of Independence, a battle took place in the nearby dunes on 18 May 1919 between the Latvian Separate Brigade of the Latvian forces, led by Captain Paulis Zolts against the Army of the Latvian Socialist Soviet Republic, with the Latvians repelling a numerically superior Soviet advance.

When the village of Sloka received city rights in 1925, Kaugurciems became a part of it until its merger into Jūrmala in 1959.
