= Sloka Stadium =

Stadium in Jūrmala, Latvia

Coordinates: 56.9495911°N 23.6101985°E

- Slokas stadions
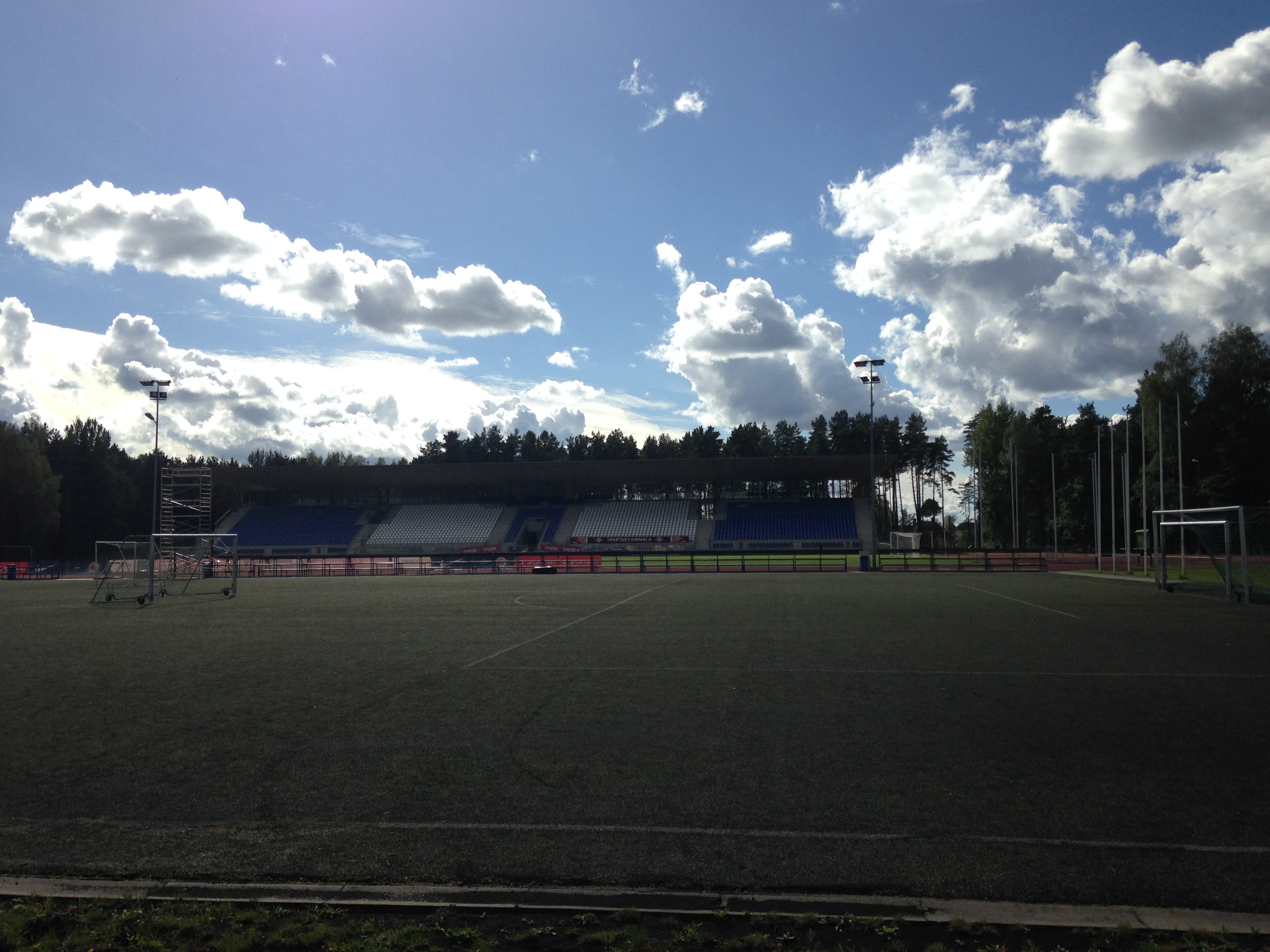
- Sloka Stadium in 2016
- Interactive map of Sloka Stadium
- Full name: Latvian: Jūrmalas pilsētas stadions "Sloka"
- Address: Skolas iela 5 Jūrmala; Latvia
- Capacity: 2500

Construction
- Renovated: 2007; 2025

Tenants
- FS Jūrmala; FK Spartaks (Virslīga) 2012–2022; FK Kauguri Jūrmala (Latvian First League) 2008-2010

Jūrmalas pilsētas stadions "Sloka" ('City of Jūrmala Sloka Stadium'), commonly referred to as Slokas Stadions, is a multi-purpose stadium in the coastal city of Jūrmala, in northwestern Latvia.

The stadium holds 2,500 people. It has been renovated in 2007 and in 2025, when artificial lighting was added.

== Uses ==
It is currently used mostly for association football matches, and was the home stadium of FK Spartaks Jūrmala, who competed in the Virslīga until the 2022 season, as well as the former club FK Kauguri/PBLC from 2008 to 2010. Current tenants include FS Jūrmala (Jūrmalas FS, 'Jūrmala City Football School') and the rugby academy of Jūrmalas SS ('Jūrmala Sports School').

The stadium also hosted the 2015–16 Latvian Football Cup final.
