= Mikalay Ryndzyuk =

Belarusian footballer

Personal information
- Full name: Mikalay Ryndzyuk
- Date of birth: 2 February 1978 (age 48)
- Place of birth: Minsk, Belarusian SSR, Soviet Union
- Height: 1.77 m (5 ft 9 1/2 in)
- Position: Forward

Youth career
- 1993–1995: Smena Minsk

Senior career*
Years	Team	Apps	(Gls)
1994–1995	Smena Minsk	19	(11)
1996–1997	BATE Borisov	45	(58)
1998–1999	Lokomotiv Moscow	12	(0)
1998–1999	→ Lokomotiv-d Moscow	31	(9)
1999	BATE Borisov	11	(9)
2000	Lokomotiv Nizhny Novgorod	9	(0)
2000	Kristall Smolensk	11	(3)
2001–2002	Gaziantepspor	6	(0)
2002	Rubin Kazan	9	(2)
2003	Dinamo Minsk	19	(8)
2004	BATE Borisov	11	(4)
2004	Shanghai The 9	10	(5)
2005	Guangzhou	18	(14)
2006	Nanjing Yoyo	16	(2)
2007–2008	Daugava Daugavpils	41	(18)
2008	→ Dinaburg (loan)	21	(9)
2009	MTZ-RIPO Minsk	11	(5)
2009–2010	Shakhtyor Soligorsk	19	(2)
2010–2011	Mash'al Mubarek	20	(7)
2011	Dinamo Samarqand	13	(4)
2012	Smorgon	7	(1)
2012	Navbahor Namangan	8	(2)
2013–2014	Smorgon	52	(23)
2016	Smorgon	0	(0)
Total		419	(196)

International career^{‡}
1996–1999	Belarus U21	16	(4)
1997–2002	Belarus	13	(3)
2004	Belarus Olympic	1	(0)

Managerial career
- 2015–2017: Smorgon
- 2026: BATE-2 Borisov
- * Club domestic league appearances and goals as of 7 January 2014 ‡ National team caps and goals as of 1 December 2009

Mikalay Ryndzyuk (Belarusian: Мікалай Рындзюк; Russian: Николай Рындюк; born 2 February 1978) is a Belarusian football coach and former player.

== Football career ==
Mikalay Ryndzyuk started his career at Smena Minsk. He played the first season at 1994/95 at third level. After he played the first winter league in 1995, he transferred to BATE Borisov, at that time in third division. His high goal scoring rate helped BATE win promotion to top division in 1997. He then was signed by Lokomotiv Moscow in 1998.

In summer 1999, he moved back to BATE, and spent 2000 season for FC Lokomotiv Nizhny Novgorod and Kristall Smolensk.

In November 2000, he was signed by Gaziantepspor, where he signed a deal until summer 2003.

But he was away from field since November 2001, and in September 2002, he transferred to Rubin Kazan.

== Honours ==
BATE Borisov

- Belarusian Premier League champion: 1999

Dinamo Minsk

- Belarusian Cup winner: 2002–03

Daugava Daugavpils

- Latvian Football Cup winner: 2008

=== International goals ===
#	Date	Venue	Opponent	Score	Result	Competition
1	5 August 1997	Dynama Stadium (Minsk), Belarus	Israel	2 – 3	2–3	Friendly
2	7 October 2000	Stadion Widzewa, Łódź, Poland	Poland	1 – 1	1–3	2002 World Cup qualifier
3	11 October 2000	Dynama Stadium (Minsk), Belarus	Armenia	2 – 0	2–1	2002 World Cup qualifier
