= FK Dinamo-Rīnuži/LASD =

Former Latvian football club

Dinamo-Rīnūži/LASD
- Full name: Futbola klubs Dinamo-Rīnūži/LASD
- Founded: before 2007
- Dissolved: around 2008
- Ground: Riga, Latvia
- League: 2. līga

FK Dinamo-Rīnūži/LASD was a Latvian football club located in Riga and playing in the Rīgas zone of the Latvian Second League.

== History ==
The team was formed as a merger of FK Dinamo Rīga and FK Rīnūži before 2007. In 2007 FK Dinamo-Rīnuži changed name to FK Dinamo-Rīnuži/LASD for sponsorship reasons. Dinamo Rīga and Rīnūži subsequently split apart around 2008.

== Players ==
=== First-team squad ===
Note: Flags indicate national team as defined under FIFA eligibility rules; some limited exceptions apply. Players may hold more than one non-FIFA nationality.

No.	Pos.	Nation	Player
—	GK	LVA	E. Klibuts
—	GK	LVA	V. Zablockis
—	DF	LVA	K. Suharevs
—	DF	LVA	A. Jerikalovs
—	DF	LVA	D. Bogdanovs
—	DF	LVA	J. Jermakovs
—	DF	LVA	A. Fedotovs
—	DF	LVA	A. Daņko
—	DF	LVA	S. Možnovs
—	MF	LVA	M. Čebotorjovs
—	MF	LVA	M. Jankovskis

No.	Pos.	Nation	Player
—	MF	LVA	Vladislavs Hercbergs
—	MF	LVA	A. Micitis
—	MF	LVA	V. Poļanskis
—	MF	LVA	V. Levčenko
—	MF	LVA	V. Gospodars
—	MF	LVA	I. Kirillovs
—	FW	LVA	A. Vasiljevs
—	FW	LVA	V. Baranovskis
—	FW	LVA	V. Pārmalis
—	FW	LVA	A. Ščogols
