= FK Vindava =

Latvian football club

Vindava
- Full name: FK Vindava Ventspils
- Founded: 2007
- Dissolved: 2009
- Ground: Ventspils 2. pamatskolas stadions
- Capacity: 500
- Chairman: Oļegs Stepanovs
- League: None
- 2008: 8th

FK Vindava is a former Latvian football club located in Ventspils. It was founded in 2007 on the basis of FK Honda, which got 4th place in 2006 in Latvian 2. līga, Kurzemes zona. In 2007 it won the 1. līga championships and was promoted to Virslīga. In 2008 season it placed 8th in Virslīga, but due to financial problems was dissolved in January 2009.

== History ==
Vindava (Windau) was the name of Ventspils before 1917.
