= FK Multibanka Rīga =

Former Latvian football club

Multibanka
- Full name: Futbola klubs Multibanka
- Ground: Latvenergo stadions, Riga, Latvia
- Chairman: Jurijs Somoņenkovs
- League: 1. līga
- 2006: 13.

Futbola klubs Multibanka was a Latvian football club, playing in the second-highest division of Latvian football. They were from the city of Riga.

== League and Cup history ==
Season	Division (Name)	Pos./Teams	Pl.	W	D	L	GS	GA	P	Latvian Football Cup	Ref
2006	Latvian First League	13/16	30	7	6	17	34	58	27	3rd round	
