= FC Tranzit =

Latvian football club

- Full name: Futbola centrs "Tranzit"
- Founded: 2006
- Ground: 2. pamatskolas stadions, Ventspils
- Capacity: 500
- Chairman: Andrejs Višņausks
- Manager: Igor Kichigin
- League: LMT Virslīga
- 2010: 9th (relegated)

FC Tranzit was a Latvian football club that is based in Ventspils. Prior to 2010 it was known as FC Tranzīts.

== Players ==
=== First-team squad ===
As of April 27, 2010 Note: Flags indicate national team as defined under FIFA eligibility rules; some limited exceptions apply. Players may hold more than one non-FIFA nationality.

No.	Pos.	Nation	Player
3	FW	LVA	Edgars Kārkliņš
7	DF	LVA	Aleksejs Soleičuks
10	MF	FRA	Imran Chamkhanov
12	DF	LVA	Māris Smirnovs
20	DF	LVA	Aleksejs Dimčuks
26	MF	LVA	Aleksandrs Baturinskis
27	FW	NGA	Jojo Ogunnupe
55	DF	FRA	Julian Rullier
--	MF	LVA	Eduards Tidenbergs
--	DF	LVA	Aleksandrs Anohins
--	FW	LVA	Daniels Vasiļjevs

No.	Pos.	Nation	Player
--	MF	LVA	Valerijs Stepanovs
--	MF	LVA	Aleksejs Tarasovs
--	MF	LVA	Bogdans Oniščuks
--	DF	LVA	Ēriks Melbārdis
--	MF	LVA	Maksims Vasiļjevs
--	DF	LVA	Ervīns Ziemelis
--	DF	LVA	Artjoms Solomatovs
--	DF	LVA	Maksims Doļņikovs
--	FW	LVA	Vlads Rimkus
--	FW	LVA	Dmitrijs Bremza

For recent transfers see: List of Latvian football transfers summer 2010.
