= FC Daugava =

Latvian football club

FC Daugava Daugavpils
- Full name: Futbola klubs "Daugava"; Football Club Daugava Daugavpils
- Founded: 1944; 82 years ago
- Dissolved: 2015; 11 years ago
- Ground: Daugava Stadium
- Capacity: 4,100
Home colours	Away colours

FC Daugava was a Latvian football club, based at the Daugava Stadium, in the city of Daugavpils. It was founded as FC Ditton in 2001. They lastly played in the Latvian Second League in 2015. They were one of two simultaneous clubs with the name Daugava and should not be confused with the historic FK Daugava Rīga.

In 2008, they won the Latvian Cup. In 2012, they won their first ever Latvian Higher League championship.

== History ==
In 2001, the team was founded with the support of Daugavpils' businessman Vladislavs Drīksne, who was the owner of the eponymous Ditton company. After first entering the city league, in a few years Ditton managed to grow and ultimately win promotion to the Virslīga in 2003, although was instantly relegated in 2004. In the following 2005 Latvian First League season Ditton won promotion once again.

In 2006, before entering the 2006 Virslīga, Russian businessman Igor Malyshkov became the main shareholder in the club. It was his decision to change the club's name to FC Daugava, taking inspiration from the historic club from Daugavpils and including the date of its founding in the club crest. Ukrainian manager Sergei Yuran was invited to join the team staff, but he was soon replaced by Sergei Kiriakov. That season the club achieved their highest position to that point, finishing 5th in the championship. Meanwhile, he also created a plan to develop the infrastructure of the club and build a new stadium - the Daugava Stadium near Daugavpils Fortress. Malishkov invited Sergei Petrenko, who was then famous for his success with Torpedo Moscow, to become the manager of the team. Petrenko left in May 2007 for family reasons. In June 2007 Igor Gamula was appointed, but he only started managing the team in August 2008. Till then the incumbent manager was Mihails Zemļinskis.

On 19 July 2008 the Daugava Stadium was officially opened. That year the club won the Latvian Cup for the first time in its history. On 8 February 2009, due to financial problems, FC Daugava merged with Dinaburg FC and formed a united team under the name of FC Dinaburg for the 2009 season. That season Dinaburg were relegated from the Latvian Higher League due to suspicions of participation in match fixing. Daugava then decided to create a team that would play in the Latvian First League the following season, meanwhile Dinaburg ended its existence, stating that the club's image was spoiled. As Daugavpils is one of the biggest cities in Latvia, the LFF came up with a proposal to offer Daugava a place in the Latvian Higher League. The offer was accepted and Daugava were given a chance to represent Daugavpils in the higher league in the 2010 season.

In 2011, the club achieved its best result until then, finishing third in the championship. In 2012 Daugava became the champions of the Latvian Higher League for the first time in the club's history.

== Match-fixing scandal ==
In July 2013 the Federbet organization expressed its concerns in regards to possible match fixing attempts concerning Daugava's UEFA Champions League game against IF Elfsborg, which the club lost 7–1, with 7 goals being scored in the second half. Prior to the 2014 Latvian Higher League season Daugava was initially denied the participation license due to non-existing youth academy but it was later obtained in exchange of promises to develop one in the near future. In October 2014, during a spot-check at the club, several of its members were interrogated, with the club's former president Oleg Gavrilov being arrested for money laundering, legalization of illegal earnings and other crimes, including ignorance of the previously imposed disqualification upon him from any activates affiliated with Latvian football. Four other people, including the club's technical director, manager and two players were disqualified for an indeterminate period of time until the end of the investigation. The investigation was lead in cooperation of the Latvian Football Federation, UEFA and the State Police of Latvia.

The scandal dealt a lethal blow to the club. It was not issued the necessary licence for entering the 2015 Virslīga and thus entered the third-tier Latvian Second League Latgale Zone. In December 2015 the club was excluded from the Latvian Football Federation and folded soon after.

== Logo ==
FC Daugava are currently using a logo based on the design of the legendary Latvian football club FK Daugava Rīga that was founded in 1944 and played in the Soviet Top League.

== Honours ==
- Virsliga
  - 2012
- Latvian Cup
  - 2008
- Latvian Supercup
  - 2013
- Virslīga Winter Cup
  - 2013

== Participation in Latvian championships ==
Season	Position	Matches	Wins	Draws	Loses	Goals	Points	Manager	Top-scorer
2001	1^{1}	4	4	0	0	15—0	12	(Latvia) Genādijs Pašins	(Latvia) Pjotrs Vnukovs – 7 goals
2002	2^{2}	28	19	7	2	94—22	65	(Latvia) Genādijs Pašins	(Latvia) Kirils Kurbatovs, (Latvia) Pjotrs Vnukovs – 15 goals
2003	3^{2}	27	16	2	9	79—32	50	(Latvia) Ēriks Grigjans	(Latvia) Kirils Kurbatovs – 11 goals
2004	7	28	7	5	16	20—62	26	(Latvia) Ēriks Grigjans	(Latvia) Kirils Kurbatovs – 6 goals
2005	5^{2}	26	14	5	7	59—28	47	(Latvia) Sergejs Pogodins	(Latvia) Maksims Deņisevičs – 10 goals
2006	5	28	10	8	10	33—41	38	(Russia) Sergei Yuran, (Russia) Sergei Kiriakov, (Russia) Igor Kichigin	(Russia) Aleksandr Sonin – 7 goals
2007	5	28	9	6	13	33—38	33	(Russia) Sergei Petrenko, (Ukraine) Igor Gamula	(Belarus) Mikalay Ryndzyuk – 11 goals
2008	5	28	10	7	11	40—35	37	(Latvia) Mihails Zemļinskis, (Ukraine) Igor Gamula	(Latvia) Artjoms Rudņevs, (Belarus) Mikalay Ryndzyuk – 7 goals
2009	9	26	9	7	10	38—43	34	(Latvia) Kirils Kurbatovs	(Latvia) Ričards Raščevskis – 6 goals
2010	4	27	16	8	3	35—16	56	(Georgia (country)) Tamaz Pertia	(Georgia (country)) Mamuka Ghonghadze – 6 goals
2011	3	32	19	6	7	58—30	63	(Georgia (country)) Tamaz Pertia, (Russia) Leonid Nazarenko	(Georgia (country)) Mamuka Ghonghadze – 21 goals
2012	1	36	23	9	4	64—25	78	(Russia) Ravil Sabitov, (Moldova) Ivan Tabanov	(Georgia (country)) Mamuka Ghonghadze – 18 goals
2013	3	27	15	7	5	44—19	52	(Moldova) Ivan Tabanov	(Latvia) Andrejs Kovaļovs – 16 goals
2014	5	36	19	8	9	53—39	65	(Russia) Viktor Demidov, (Ukraine) Hennadiy Orbu, (Moldova) Ivan Tabanov	(Latvia) Jevgēņijs Kosmačovs – 12 goals

Notes

^{1} Season in the Latvian Second League

^{2} Season in the Latvian First League

== European record ==
Season	Competition	Round	Club	Home	Away	Aggregate
2011–12	UEFA Europa League	First qualifying round	(Norway) Tromsø IL	0–5	1–2	1–7
2012–13	UEFA Europa League	First qualifying round	(Lithuania) FK Sūduva	2–3	1–0	3–3 (a)
2013–14	UEFA Champions League	Second qualifying round	(Sweden) IF Elfsborg	0–4	1–7	1–11
2014–15	UEFA Europa League	First qualifying round	(Faroe Islands) Víkingur Gøta	1–1	1–2	2–3

== Sponsors ==
Role	Sponsors
Kit manufacturer	(Italy) Erreà
Sponsors	(United States) Mueller Sports Medicine (Germany) Adidas (Latvia) Līgatne (Latvia) Radio Alise+ (Latvia) Nasha.lv (Latvia) D-fakti.lv (Latvia) Latgales Laiks (Latvia) Seichas (Latvia) grani.lv (Latvia) 7sport.lv

== Managers ==
- (Russia) Sergei Yuran (1 Jan 2006 – 28 July 2006)
- (Russia) Sergei Kiriakov (June 2006 – Sept 2006)
- (Russia) Sergei Petrenko (1 Dec 2006 – 25 May 2007)
- (Russia) Igor Kichigin (Sept 2006 – Dec 2006)
- (Ukraine) Igor Gamula (June 2007 – Nov 2007)
- (Latvia) Mihails Zemļinskis (Nov 2007 – Aug 2008)
- (Ukraine) Igor Gamula (Aug 2008 – June 2009)
- (Latvia) Kirils Kurbatovs (June 2009 – Dec 2009)
- (Latvia) Sergejs Pogodins (Jan 2010 – Feb 2010)
- (Georgia (country)) Tamaz Pertia (interim) (1 Feb 2010 – 31 Jan 2011)
- (Russia) Aleksandr Laptev (Feb 2010)
- (Latvia) Sergejs Pogodins (Feb 2010 – June 2010)
- (Georgia (country)) Tamaz Pertia (2 July 2010 – 30 June 2011)
- (Russia) Leonid Nazarenko (July 2011 – Dec 2011)
- (Russia) Ravil Sabitov (22 Dec 2011 – 1 May 2012)
- (Moldova) Ivan Tabanov (1 July 2012 – Nov 2013)
- (Russia) Viktor Demidov (1 Jan 2014 – June 2014)
- (Ukraine) Hennadiy Orbu (4 June 2014 – Aug 2014)
- (Moldova) Ivan Tabanov (8 Aug 2014 – Oct 2014)
