= List of Latvian football transfers winter 2013–14 =

This is a list of Latvian football transfers in the 2013–14 winter transfer window by club. Only transfers of the Virsliga are included.

All transfers mentioned are shown in the references at the bottom of the page. If you wish to insert a transfer that isn't mentioned there, please add a reference.

== Latvian Higher League ==
=== Ventspils ===
In: Note: Flags indicate national team as defined under FIFA eligibility rules; some limited exceptions apply. Players may hold more than one non-FIFA nationality.

| No. | Pos. | Nation | Player |
|---|---|---|---|
| — | GK | LVA | Valentīns Raļkevičs (loan return from (Lithuania) Tauras Tauragė) |
| — | DF | ESP | Kiko Insa (from (Iceland) Víkingur Ólafsvík) |
| — | DF | LVA | Deniss Bezuščonoks (from Ventspils-2) |
| — | MF | LVA | Vitālijs Rečickis (from Daugava Rīga) |
| — | MF | LVA | Eduards Tīdenbergs (from Ventspils-2) |
| — | MF | LVA | Edgars Vērdiņš (loan return from Jelgava) |
| — | FW | LVA | Kaspars Svārups (loan return from Jūrmala) |
| — | FW | ALB | Ndue Mujeci (from (Albania) Ada Velipojë) |

Out: Note: Flags indicate national team as defined under FIFA eligibility rules; some limited exceptions apply. Players may hold more than one non-FIFA nationality.

| No. | Pos. | Nation | Player |
|---|---|---|---|
| 4 | DF | LVA | Vitālijs Smirnovs (to Spartaks) |
| 7 | FW | LVA | Daniils Turkovs (to (Poland) GKS Bełchatów) |
| 13 | FW | URU | Federico Martinez (to (Bolivia) Oriente Petrolero) |
| 17 | MF | RUS | Eduard Sukhanov (to (Russia) Volga Nizhny Novgorod) |
| 19 | MF | LVA | Igors Tarasovs (to (Belarus) Neman Grodno) |
| 99 | GK | LVA | Vitālijs Meļņičenko (to Spartaks) |

=== Skonto ===
In: Note: Flags indicate national team as defined under FIFA eligibility rules; some limited exceptions apply. Players may hold more than one non-FIFA nationality.

| No. | Pos. | Nation | Player |
|---|---|---|---|
| — | GK | LVA | Andrejs Pavlovs (from Spartaks) |
| — | DF | GAM | Ali Ceesay (from (Slovakia) MŠK Žilina) |
| — | MF | AZE | Murad Iskandarli (free agent) |
| — | DF | LVA | Vladislavs Kuzmins (from Skonto FC-2) |
| — | MF | LVA | Viktors Morozs (from (Belarus) Naftan Novopolotsk) |
| — | MF | LVA | Edgars Jermolajevs (from Daugava Daugavpils) |
| — | MF | RUS | Dmitri Starodub (from (Russia) Dynamo Moscow) |
| — | FW | LVA | Ņikita Ivanovs (from FK Daugava Rīga-2/Šitika FS) |

Out: Note: Flags indicate national team as defined under FIFA eligibility rules; some limited exceptions apply. Players may hold more than one non-FIFA nationality.

| No. | Pos. | Nation | Player |
|---|---|---|---|
| 1 | GK | LTU | Paulius Grybauskas (to (Lithuania) Trakai) |
| 3 | DF | LVA | Renārs Rode (to (Czech Republic) Teplice) |
| 8 | MF | LVA | Aleksandrs Fertovs (to (Ukraine) Sevastopol) |
| 9 | FW | LVA | Kristaps Blanks (to Daugava Rīga) |
| 11 | MF | LVA | Alans Siņeļņikovs (to (Czech Republic) Baník Ostrava) |
| 12 | FW | LVA | Elvis Stuglis (to METTA/LU) |
| 14 | MF | LVA | Ingars Stuglis (to METTA/LU) |
| 15 | MF | LVA | Nikolajs Zaicevs (released) |
| 16 | GK | LVA | Oskars Darģis (to METTA/LU) |
| 19 | MF | GEO | Lado Datunashvili (released) |
| 20 | FW | LVA | Valērijs Šabala (to (Belgium) Club Brugge, back on loan till July 1) |
| 21 | DF | LVA | Nauris Bulvītis (to (Switzerland) Aarau) |
| 24 | DF | RUS | Vladislav Ovsyannikov (to (Russia) Strogino Moscow) |
| 25 | FW | LVA | Artūrs Karašausks (on loan to (Russia) Rubin Kazan) |
| 27 | DF | GEO | Lasha Dvali (to (England) Reading, back on loan in co-ownership) |

=== Daugava Daugavpils ===
In: Note: Flags indicate national team as defined under FIFA eligibility rules; some limited exceptions apply. Players may hold more than one non-FIFA nationality.

| No. | Pos. | Nation | Player |
|---|---|---|---|
| — | DF | GEO | Giorgi Khumarashvili (loan return from Ilūkste) |
| — | DF | LVA | Aleksandrs Ivanovs (from Ilūkste) |
| — | DF | LVA | Aleksejs Kuplovs-Oginskis (from Ilūkste) |
| — | MF | LVA | Jevgēņijs Kosmačovs (from Tukums 2000) |
| — | MF | RUS | Ilia Bogdanov (from (Russia) Pskov-747 Pskov) |
| — | MF | RUS | Andrei Arlashin (from (Russia) Dnepr Smolensk) |
| — | MF | LVA | Jurijs Morozs (from Ilūkste) |
| — | FW | LVA | Vladimirs Volkovs (loan return from Ilūkste) |
| — | FW | LVA | Ēriks Kokins (loan return from Ilūkste) |
| — | FW | GEO | Jamal Jaliashvili (loan return from Ilūkste) |
| — | FW | RUS | Dmitri Kozlov (from Ilūkste) |
| — | FW | AZE | Murad Hüseynov (from (Serbia) Sloboda Užice) |

Out: Note: Flags indicate national team as defined under FIFA eligibility rules; some limited exceptions apply. Players may hold more than one non-FIFA nationality.

| No. | Pos. | Nation | Player |
|---|---|---|---|
| 3 | DF | LVA | Igors Savčenkovs (to (Georgia (country)) Torpedo Kutaisi) |
| 5 | MF | LVA | Armands Pētersons (to Jelgava) |
| 6 | MF | LVA | Andrejs Kovaļovs (to (Moldova) Dacia Chișinău) |
| 7 | MF | LVA | Edgars Jermolajevs (to Skonto) |
| 8 | FW | NGA | Stanley Ibe (to (Romania) UTA Arad) |
| 9 | MF | LVA | Mihails Ziziļevs (to (Lithuania) Klaipėdos Granitas) |
| 10 | FW | LVA | Guntars Silagailis (to Rēzekne) |
| 11 | MF | LVA | Jurijs Sokolovs (to BFC Daugavpils) |
| 13 | MF | NGA | Daniel Ola (to (Romania) UTA Arad) |
| 14 | FW | NGA | Ibrahim Babatunde (to (Lebanon) Racing Beirut) |
| 15 | MF | ROU | Bogdan Spătaru (to (Romania) CF Brăila) |
| 19 | MF | MDA | Sergiu Japalau (released) |
| 21 | FW | GEO | Mamuka Ghonghadze (to (Georgia (country)) Torpedo Kutaisi) |
| 23 | MF | ROU | Dragoš Militaru (to (Moldova) Dacia Chișinău) |
| 24 | DF | LVA | Dmitrijs Halvitovs (to Jūrmala) |
| — | GK | LVA | Igors Labuts (to Jūrmala, previously on loan at Ilūkste) |
| — | DF | LVA | Jevgēņijs Simonovs (to Rēzekne, previously on loan at Ilūkste) |

=== Daugava Rīga ===
In: Note: Flags indicate national team as defined under FIFA eligibility rules; some limited exceptions apply. Players may hold more than one non-FIFA nationality.

| No. | Pos. | Nation | Player |
|---|---|---|---|
| — | GK | LVA | Jānis Krūmiņš (from Jūrmala) |
| — | GK | LVA | Roberts Ozols (from Spartaks) |
| — | DF | LTU | Giedrius Tomkevičius (from (Lithuania) Ekranas) |
| — | DF | EGY | Nabil Abdelaziz (from (Egypt) Al Ahly) |
| — | DF | UKR | Oleg Solovych (from (Ukraine) Enerhiya Nova Kakhovka) |
| — | DF | LVA | Edijs Joksts (from (England) Oldham Athletic) |
| — | DF | LVA | Kārlis Kņūts (from Spartaks) |
| — | DF | LVA | Artis Novickis (from Tukums 2000) |
| — | MF | LVA | Raivis Vītolnieks (from Tukums 2000) |
| — | MF | LTU | Aurimas Kučys (from (Lithuania) Ekranas) |
| — | MF | LVA | Artjoms Šatskihs (from Spartaks) |
| — | FW | LVA | Verners Apiņš (from Valmiera) |
| — | FW | LVA | Kristaps Blanks (from Skonto) |
| — | FW | LTU | Tadas Markevičius (from (Lithuania) Ekranas) |

Out: Note: Flags indicate national team as defined under FIFA eligibility rules; some limited exceptions apply. Players may hold more than one non-FIFA nationality.

| No. | Pos. | Nation | Player |
|---|---|---|---|
| 1 | GK | LVA | Artūrs Vaičulis (to (Lithuania) Kruoja Pakruojis) |
| 2 | DF | LTU | Linas Klimavičius (to (Lithuania) Trakai) |
| 3 | DF | LVA | Raivis Hščanovičs (to METTA/LU) |
| 7 | MF | UKR | Vadim Gryppa (to (Ukraine) Arsenal-Kyivshchyna Bila Tserkva) |
| 9 | MF | LTU | Tomas Tamošauskas (to (Lithuania) Klaipėdos Granitas) |
| 11 | MF | LVA | Sergejs Mišins (to (Estonia) Narva Trans) |
| 12 | GK | LVA | Jevgēņijs Sazonovs (to (Norway) Moss) |
| 17 | MF | LVA | Andrejs Perepļotkins (to (Armenia) Ararat Yerevan) |
| 18 | DF | LVA | Pāvels Mihadjuks (to Jūrmala) |
| 20 | MF | LVA | Vitālijs Rečickis (to Ventspils) |
| 26 | MF | GEO | Giorgi Diakvishvili (to Jelgava) |
| 32 | GK | LVA | Romāns Maksimovs (to Rīgas Futbola skola) |
| 77 | FW | LTU | Povilas Lukšys (to (Poland) Wigry Suwałki) |
| 92 | FW | LVA | Valērijs Čistjakovs (released) |
| — | GK | LVA | Vitālijs Artjomenko (to (Norway) Hammerfest, previously on loan to (Lithuania) Dainava Alytus) |
| — | GK | LTU | Emilijus Zubas (on loan to (Denmark) Viborg FF, previously on loan at (Cyprus) AEK Larnaca) |
| — | MF | LTU | Ernestas Veliulis (to (Lithuania) Klaipėdos Granitas, previously on loan at (Lithuania) Atlantas) |

=== Liepāja (Liepājas Metalurgs) ===
In: Note: Flags indicate national team as defined under FIFA eligibility rules; some limited exceptions apply. Players may hold more than one non-FIFA nationality.

| No. | Pos. | Nation | Player |
|---|---|---|---|
| — | DF | JPN | Keisuke Hoshino (from (Japan) Tochigi Uva) |
| — | DF | SVK | Ivan Pecha (from (Azerbaijan) Ravan Baku) |
| — | DF | LVA | Jorens Gorkšs (from Auda) |
| — | DF | LVA | Juris Kučma (from Varavīksne) |
| — | DF | LVA | Jānis Jēkabsons (from Liepājas Metalurgs-2) |
| — | MF | ARG | Cristian Torres (from (Azerbaijan) Ravan Baku) |
| — | FW | LVA | Māris Verpakovskis (from (Greece) Ergotelis) |
| — | FW | LVA | Kristaps Grebis (from Jūrmala) |
| — | FW | LVA | Artūrs Kupčs (from Liepājas Metalurgs-2) |

Out: Note: Flags indicate national team as defined under FIFA eligibility rules; some limited exceptions apply. Players may hold more than one non-FIFA nationality.

| No. | Pos. | Nation | Player |
|---|---|---|---|
| 4 | DF | LVA | Dzintars Zirnis (retired) |
| 8 | FW | LVA | Jurģis Kalns (to METTA/LU) |
| 11 | MF | LVA | Roberts Savaļnieks (to (Poland) Jagiellonia Białystok) |
| 13 | MF | LVA | Bogdans Petruks (to 1625 Liepāja) |
| 15 | MF | LVA | Andrejs Kiriļins (to Jelgava) |
| 16 | MF | LVA | Dmitrijs Hmizs (to Spartaks) |
| 20 | MF | LVA | Genādijs Soloņicins (retired) |
| 25 | DF | LVA | Ingus Šlampe (to Spartaks) |
| 28 | DF | LVA | Antons Jemeļins (to (Moldova) Tiraspol) |

=== Jūrmala ===
In: Note: Flags indicate national team as defined under FIFA eligibility rules; some limited exceptions apply. Players may hold more than one non-FIFA nationality.

| No. | Pos. | Nation | Player |
|---|---|---|---|
| — | GK | LVA | Kristaps Dzelme (from (Estonia) Narva Trans) |
| — | GK | LVA | Igors Labuts (from Daugava Daugavpils) |
| — | DF | LVA | Andrejs Panasjuks (from Spartaks) |
| — | DF | LVA | Pāvels Mihadjuks (from Daugava Rīga) |
| — | DF | LVA | Dmitrijs Halvitovs (from Daugava Daugavpils) |
| — | DF | LVA | Dmitrijs Šiļuks (from Gulbene) |
| — | DF | ARG | Nahuel Jesus Guerrero (from (Argentina) Racing de Trelew) |
| — | MF | ARG | Benito Montalvo (from (Paraguay) Cerro Porteño PF) |
| — | MF | LVA | Maksims Rafaļskis (from (Iceland) Íþróttabandalag Akraness) |
| — | MF | PAR | Orlando Bordón (from (Argentina) Juventud Unida Universitario) |
| — | DF | ARG | Daniel Romero (from (Argentina) Club Atlético Nueva Chicago) |
| — | FW | URU | Diego Silva (from (Cyprus) AEK Kouklia) |
| — | FW | ESP | Juanma (from (Spain) Badalona) |
| — | FW | ARG | Lucas Trecarichi (from (Greece) Kallithea) |
| — | FW | SUI | Kevin Gissi (from (Spain) CD Alcoyano) |

Out: Note: Flags indicate national team as defined under FIFA eligibility rules; some limited exceptions apply. Players may hold more than one non-FIFA nationality.

| No. | Pos. | Nation | Player |
|---|---|---|---|
| 3 | DF | LVA | Sergejs Golubevs (to Rīgas Futbola skola) |
| 4 | DF | LVA | Artjoms Kuzņecovs (to Rīgas Futbola skola) |
| 5 | MF | RUS | Vladimir Barmin (released) |
| 7 | MF | RUS | Sergei Chasovsky (released) |
| 9 | MF | LVA | Deniels Calkovskis (released) |
| 10 | FW | LVA | Arevšats Hačatrjans (released) |
| 11 | FW | LVA | Kaspars Svārups (loan return to Ventspils) |
| 14 | MF | LVA | Andrejs Prohorenkovs (to Ogre) |
| 17 | FW | POR | Paulo César Bunze (released) |
| 19 | MF | JPN | Yusaku Toyoshima (to (Montenegro) Lovćen Cetinje) |
| 22 | GK | LVA | Jevgēņijs Laizāns (released) |
| 23 | FW | LVA | Kristaps Grebis (to Liepāja) |
| 26 | FW | RUS | Kirill Mikaelyan (released) |
| 67 | GK | LVA | Jānis Krūmiņš (to Daugava Rīga) |
| 77 | GK | LVA | Alberts Nikoļskis (to Gulbene) |

=== Spartaks ===
In: Note: Flags indicate national team as defined under FIFA eligibility rules; some limited exceptions apply. Players may hold more than one non-FIFA nationality.

| No. | Pos. | Nation | Player |
|---|---|---|---|
| — | GK | LVA | Pāvels Davidovs (from (Lithuania) Sūduva Marijampolė) |
| — | GK | LVA | Vitālijs Meļņičenko (from Ventspils) |
| — | GK | LVA | Niks Rubezis (from Rīgas Futbola skola) |
| — | DF | LVA | Ingus Šlampe (from Liepājas Metalurgs) |
| — | DF | LVA | Ritus Krjauklis (from (South Africa) Ajax Cape Town) |
| — | DF | LVA | Vitālijs Smirnovs (from Ventspils) |
| — | DF | RUS | Nikita Cherepanov (from (Russia) Lokomotiv-2 Moscow) |
| — | DF | BIH | Adi Mehremić (from (Slovakia) Ružomberok) |
| 7 | MF | FIN | Moshtagh Yaghoubi (from (Finland) Honka) |
| — | MF | LVA | Igors Kozlovs (from (Lithuania) Ekranas) |
| — | MF | LVA | Dmitrijs Hmizs (from Liepājas Metalurgs) |
| — | MF | COL | Peter Dominguez (from (Colombia) Atlético Huila) |
| — | MF | BIH | Marko Perisic (from (Bosnia and Herzegovina) Slavija Sarajevo) |
| — | MF | GHA | Eric Tuffor (free agent) |
| — | MF | GHA | Issifu Lamptey (free agent) |
| — | FW | LVA | Ēriks Punculs (from (Spain) Ciudad de Plasencia) |
| — | FW | LVA | Edgars Gauračs (from (Russia) Torpedo Moscow) |
| — | FW | RUS | Aleksei Sapogov (from (Russia) Volga Nizhny Novgorod) |
| — | FW | LVA | Jurijs Krivošeja (from Skonto-2) |
| — | FW | GEO | Mikheil Rostiashvili (from (Georgia (country)) Samtredia) |
| — | FW | GHA | George Arhin (from (Ghana) Nania Accra) |
| — | FW | GHA | Abdallah Suallah (free agent) |

Out: Note: Flags indicate national team as defined under FIFA eligibility rules; some limited exceptions apply. Players may hold more than one non-FIFA nationality.

| No. | Pos. | Nation | Player |
|---|---|---|---|
| 1 | GK | LVA | Andrejs Pavlovs (to Skonto) |
| 2 | MF | LVA | Artjoms Šatskihs (to Daugava Rīga) |
| 3 | DF | LVA | Nikolajs Kulmanakovs (released) |
| 4 | DF | RUS | Zhantemir Soblirov (released) |
| 7 | MF | FIN | Moshtagh Yaghoubi (on loan to (Russia) Dynamo Moscow) |
| 10 | MF | LVA | Andrejs Siņicins (to (Estonia) Narva Trans) |
| 13 | FW | COL | Luis Angulo (released) |
| 11 | MF | LVA | Aleksandrs Kļimovs (to (Cyprus) Akritas Chlorakas) |
| 14 | FW | SLV | Ricardo Ulloa (loan return to (El Salvador) FAS) |
| 15 | MF | COL | Daniel García (released) |
| 19 | GK | LVA | Roberts Ozols (to Daugava Rīga) |
| 21 | DF | COL | Duvan Castañeda (released) |
| 22 | DF | LVA | Konstantīns Budilovs (to (Norway) Spjelkavik IL) |
| 25 | DF | LVA | Andrejs Panasjuks (to Jūrmala) |
| 27 | DF | LVA | Kārlis Kņūts (to Daugava Rīga) |
| 30 | GK | LVA | Jānis Skābardis (loan return to Auda) |
| 77 | FW | GHA | Patrick Twumasi (on loan to (Russia) Amkar Perm, previously on loan at (Kazakhstan) Astana) |

=== Jelgava ===
In: Note: Flags indicate national team as defined under FIFA eligibility rules; some limited exceptions apply. Players may hold more than one non-FIFA nationality.

| No. | Pos. | Nation | Player |
|---|---|---|---|
| — | DF | LVA | Aleksandrs Baturinskis (free agent) |
| — | MF | LVA | Artis Lazdiņš (from (Poland) Piast Gliwice) |
| — | MF | LVA | Andrejs Kiriļins (from Liepājas Metalurgs) |
| — | MF | GEO | Giorgi Diakvishvili (from Daugava Rīga) |
| — | MF | LVA | Armands Pētersons (from Daugava Daugavpils) |
| — | FW | LVA | Artis Jaudzems (from METTA/LU) |
| — | FW | LVA | Vladislavs Kozlovs (free agent) |
| — | FW | LVA | Kristaps Soloveiko (from Jelgava-2) |

Out: Note: Flags indicate national team as defined under FIFA eligibility rules; some limited exceptions apply. Players may hold more than one non-FIFA nationality.

| No. | Pos. | Nation | Player |
|---|---|---|---|
| 3 | DF | RUS | Alexander Lozovoy (released) |
| 5 | DF | LVA | Igors Barinovs (to Rīgas Futbola skola) |
| 13 | MF | LTU | Mindaugas Grigaravičius (to (Lithuania) Sūduva Marijampolė) |
| 16 | GK | LVA | Kaspars Ribaks (to Rīgas Futbola skola) |
| 17 | MF | LVA | Normunds Kaļķis (released) |
| 18 | FW | LVA | Vitālijs Abramovs (released) |
| 19 | DF | FRA | Axel Morin (released) |
| 20 | FW | LVA | Dmitrijs Paplavskis (released) |
| 21 | MF | LVA | Edgars Vērdiņš (loan return to Ventspils) |
| 22 | MF | LVA | Igors Lapkovskis (to Jēkabpils) |

=== METTA/LU ===
In: Note: Flags indicate national team as defined under FIFA eligibility rules; some limited exceptions apply. Players may hold more than one non-FIFA nationality.

| No. | Pos. | Nation | Player |
|---|---|---|---|
| — | GK | LVA | Oskars Darģis (from Skonto) |
| — | DF | LVA | Raivis Hščanovičs (from Daugava Rīga) |
| — | DF | LVA | Jānis Kauss (from METTA/LU-2) |
| — | DF | LVA | Mārtiņš Ozols (from METTA/LU-2) |
| — | MF | LVA | Deniss Tarasovs (free agent) |
| — | MF | LVA | Ingars Stuglis (from Skonto) |
| — | MF | LVA | Raitis Grablovskis (from METTA/LU-2) |
| — | FW | LVA | Jurģis Kalns (from Liepājas Metalurgs) |
| — | FW | LVA | Elvis Stuglis (from Skonto) |

Out: Note: Flags indicate national team as defined under FIFA eligibility rules; some limited exceptions apply. Players may hold more than one non-FIFA nationality.

| No. | Pos. | Nation | Player |
|---|---|---|---|
| 5 | MF | LVA | Vladislavs Pavļučenko (to Gulbene) |
| 19 | FW | LVA | Artis Jaudzems (to Jelgava) |
| 33 | DF | LVA | Mārcis Savinovs (to Gulbene) |
| 34 | DF | LVA | Māris Savinovs (to Gulbene) |
| 89 | DF | LVA | Juris Skābardis (to Ogre) |

=== BFC Daugavpils ===
In: Note: Flags indicate national team as defined under FIFA eligibility rules; some limited exceptions apply. Players may hold more than one non-FIFA nationality.

| No. | Pos. | Nation | Player |
|---|---|---|---|
| — | DF | JPN | Yuta Kinowaki (from (Poland) Energetyk Gryfino) |
| — | DF | RUS | Elmin Gasanov (from (Russia) Lokomotiv Primorskiy) |
| — | MF | LVA | Jurijs Sokolovs (from Daugava Daugavpils) |
| — | MF | BRA | Luiz Doretto (from Carnikava) |
| — | MF | JPN | Taisei Yamazaki (from (Japan) Shizuoka Sangyo University) |
| — | FW | EGY | Ibrahim Abdellatif (from (Egypt) Smouha Sporting Club) |

Out: Note: Flags indicate national team as defined under FIFA eligibility rules; some limited exceptions apply. Players may hold more than one non-FIFA nationality.

| No. | Pos. | Nation | Player |
|---|---|---|---|
| 2 | DF | LVA | Jevgēņijs Bragins (released) |
| 4 | MF | LVA | Pāvels Koļcovs (to Rēzekne) |
