= 2013 Latvian Higher League =

Latvian football league season for the highest division

Latvian Higher League
- Season: 2013
- Champions: FK Ventspils
- Relegated: Ilūkstes NSS
- Champions League: FK Ventspils
- Europa League: Daugava Daugavpils; Daugava Riga
- Matches played: 135
- Goals scored: 392 (2.9 per match)
- Top goalscorer: Artūrs Karašausks; Andrejs Kovaļovs (16 goals)
- Biggest home win: FK Daugava 7-1 Ilūkstes NSS
- Biggest away win: Ilūkstes NSS 2-10 SK Liepājas Metalurgs
- Highest scoring: Ilūkstes NSS 2-10 SK Liepājas Metalurgs
- Longest winning run: FK Ventspils, Skonto FC (6)
- Longest unbeaten run: Skonto FC (26)
- Longest losing run: Ilūkstes NSS (7)

The 2013 Latvian Higher League was the 22nd season of top-tier football in Latvia. FC Daugava were the defending champions. The season started on 29 March 2013.

The league comprised ten teams. The champions of this season were FK Ventspils, followed by Skonto FC

== Teams ==
The league had a ten-team circuit like the 2012 season. 2012 Latvian First League champions Ilūkstes NSS from Ilūkste were directly promoted.

FK Daugava Rīga finished the 2012 season in ninth place and were therefore required to compete in a two-legged promotion/relegation play-off against First Division runners-up BFC Daugava. FK Daugava Riga won the play-off 4–1 on aggregate and therefore stayed in the Higher League.

=== Stadiums and locations ===
Location of teams in the 2013 Latvian Higher League

Club	Location	Stadium	Capacity
FC Daugava	Daugavpils	Daugava Stadium	4,100
FK Daugava Rīga	Riga	Daugava Stadium	5,000
Ilūkstes NSS	Ilūkste	Ilūkstes pilsētas stadions	500
FK Jelgava	Jelgava	Zemgales Olimpiskais Sporta Centrs	2,200
FC Jūrmala	Jūrmala	Slokas Stadium	5,000
SK Liepājas Metalurgs	Liepāja	Daugava Stadium	6,000
FS Metta/LU	Riga	Stadions Arkādija	500
Skonto FC	Riga	Skonto Stadium	10,000
FK Spartaks Jūrmala	Jūrmala	Slokas Stadium	5,000
FK Ventspils	Ventspils	Olimpiskais Stadium	3,200

=== Personnel and kits ===
Note: Flags indicate national team as has been defined under FIFA eligibility rules. Players and Managers may hold more than one non-FIFA nationality.

Team	Manager	Captain	Kit manufacturer	Shirt sponsor
FC Daugava Daugavpils	(Moldova) Ivan Tabanov	(Nigeria) Daniel Ola	Erreà	—
FK Daugava Rīga	(Lithuania) Virginijus Liubšys	(Lithuania) Mantas Savenas	Nike	—
Ilūkstes NSS	(Latvia) Alens Vinakurovs	(Russia) Dmitri Kozlov	Erreà	—
FK Jelgava	(Latvia) Sergejs Golubevs	(Latvia) Deniss Petrenko	Macron	Igate
FC Jūrmala	(Latvia) Mihails Koņevs	(Latvia) Alberts Nikoļskis	Givova	—
SK Liepājas Metalurgs	(Latvia) Jānis Intenbergs	(Latvia) Antons Jemeļins	Adidas	—
FS Metta/LU	(Latvia) Andris Riherts	(Latvia) Artūrs Biezais	Nike	SMS Credit.lv
Skonto FC	(Georgia (country)) Tamaz Pertia	(Latvia) Juris Laizāns	Jako	Granat Investment
FK Spartaks Jūrmala	(Latvia) Jurijs Popkovs	(Latvia) Dmitrijs Daņilovs	Nike	—
FK Ventspils	(Latvia) Jurģis Pučinsks	(Latvia) Vitālijs Smirnovs	Adidas	VK Tranzīts

=== Managerial changes ===
Team	Outgoing manager	Manner of departure	Date of vacancy	Position in table	Incoming manager	Date of appointment
Jelgava	(Latvia) Dainis Kazakevičs	Own decision	4 December 2012	Pre-Season	(Latvia) Jānis Dreimanis	20 December 2012
Skonto	(Latvia) Marians Pahars	Own decision	22 December 2012	Pre-Season	(Georgia (country)) Tamaz Pertia	22 December 2012
FK Daugava Rīga	(Latvia) Jurijs Popkovs	End of contract	27 December 2012	Pre-Season	(Lithuania) Virginijus Liubšys	27 December 2012
FC Jūrmala	(Russia) Vladimir Pachko	End of contract	9 January 2013	Pre-Season	(Latvia) Mihails Koņevs	9 January 2013
Spartaks	(Lithuania) Arminas Narbekovas	End of contract	10 December 2012	Pre-Season	(Belarus) Oleg Kubarev	7 February 2013
Ilūkste	(Latvia) Alens Vinakurovs	Own decision	6 March 2013	Pre-Season	(Russia) Vladimir Pachko	6 March 2013
Jelgava	(Latvia) Jānis Dreimanis	Health issues	22 March 2013	Pre-Season	(Latvia) Sergejs Golubevs	22 March 2013
Spartaks	(Belarus) Oleg Kubarev	Sacked	27 July 2013	5th	(Latvia) Aleksandrs Stradiņš	27 July 2013
Spartaks	(Latvia) Aleksandrs Stradiņš	Sacked	22 September 2013	6th	(Latvia) Jurijs Popkovs	22 September 2013
Ilūkste	(Russia) Vladimir Pachko	Own decision	End of September	10th	(Latvia) Alens Vinakurovs	End of September

== Broadcasting ==
As in the previous season most of the matches are being transmitted live via sportacentrs.com online and sportacentrs TV channel. In June 2012 broadcasting rights were also bought by the English company Bet365. Since 2012, the league's homepage futbolavirsliga.lv has been active and since September 2012 this website has been accompanied by the InStat Football system, showing information and analysis of each match individually. Since October 2012, the Virslīga has also had its own analytical broadcast after each round of matches with football experts discussing the games and future events connected to Latvian football. It is transmitted via sportacentrs TV.

== League table ==
Pos	Team	Pld	W	D	L	GF	GA	GD	Pts	Qualification or relegation
1	Ventspils (C)	27	21	4	2	65	19	+46	67	Qualification for Champions League second qualifying round
2	Skonto	27	18	8	1	68	11	+57	62	Excluded from European competitions (Note: UEFA barred Skonto from European competitions for three years for falling foul of Financial Fair Play regulations.)
3	Daugava Daugavpils	27	15	7	5	44	19	+25	52	Qualification for Europa League first qualifying round
4	Daugava Rīga	27	14	6	7	44	21	+23	48	Qualification for Europa League first qualifying round
5	Liepājas Metalurgs	27	11	7	9	54	35	+19	40	Dissolved after the season
6	Jūrmala	27	7	5	15	20	52	−32	26	
7	Spartaks Jūrmala	27	7	4	16	30	49	−19	25	
8	Jelgava	27	5	8	14	26	46	−20	23	Qualification for Europa League first qualifying round
9	METTA/LU (O)	27	4	7	16	15	47	−32	19	Qualification for relegation play-offs
10	Ilūkstes NSS (R)	27	2	6	19	26	93	−67	12	Relegation to Latvian First League

Source: LFF:Virslīga 2013
Rules for classification: 1st points; 2nd head-to-head points; 3rd head-to-head goal difference; 4th overall wins; 5th goal difference; 6th goals scored. The winners of the 2013–14 Latvian Football Cup competition will qualify for the first qualifying round of the 2014–15 UEFA Europa League.
(C) Champions; (O) Play-off winners; (R) Relegated

=== Relegation play-offs ===
The 9th-placed sides will face the runners-up of the 2013 Latvian First League in a two-legged play-off, with the winner being awarded a spot in the 2014 Higher League competition.

14 November 2013
19:00

FS METTA/LU	1–0	FB Gulbene
Vapne 72' (pen.)

Hanzas vidusskolas laukums, Riga

17 November 2013
14:00

FB Gulbene	2–4	FS METTA/LU
Rimkus 26'; Kazura 33'		Kalniņš 11', 85', 88'; Milašēvičs 67' (pen.)

Hanzas vidusskolas laukums, Riga

FS METTA/LU won 5–2 on aggregate.

== Results ==
Regular home games
Home \ Away	DGD	ILU	JEL	FCJ	DGR	LIE	MLU	SKO	SPJ	VEN
FC Daugava Daugavpils		5–0	2–1	1–0	0–0	1–1	3–0	1–4	3–2	0–1
Ilūkstes NSS	0–2		2–1	0–2	2–5	1–2	1–1	1–7	1–3	1–7
Jelgava	0–3	2–2		0–1	0–3	2–2	1–0	0–3	1–2	1–2
FC Jūrmala	0–1	1–1	4–2		0–5	3–1	1–2	0–5	0–1	0–2
FK Daugava Rīga	0–1	4–0	1–0	1–0		2–1	1–1	0–0	0–0	0–1
SK Liepājas Metalurgs	2–2	3–1	3–0	2–0	0–2		4–0	0–5	1–2	3–1
METTA/LU	1–2	0–0	0–0	1–2	1–2	0–3		0–2	0–1	0–2
Skonto FC	0–0	5–0	1–1	0–0	5–0	2–0	4–0		3–1	3–0
Spartaks Jūrmala	0–2	2–2	4–2	0–0	0–1	1–2	4–0	1–2		2–3
Ventspils	4–3	4–1	4–0	3–0	2–1	2–2	4–0	0–0	1–0	

Legend: Blue = home team win; Yellow = draw; Red = away team win.

Additional home games
Home \ Away	DGD	ILU	JEL	FCJ	DGR	LIE	MLU	SKO	SPJ	VEN
FC Daugava Daugavpils		6–1	0–0		0–1	1–0		0–0		
Ilūkstes NSS						2–10	1–2	0–2		0–5
Jelgava		3–1		2–2	1–0		1–1			
FC Jūrmala	0–3	0–0			0–4				2–1	
FK Daugava Rīga		7–1				2–2		0–2		0–1
SK Liepājas Metalurgs			0–0	3–0			0–0		6–0	0–1
METTA/LU	1–0			0–1	0–2				2–0	
Skonto FC			0–2	5–0		2–1	2–2			1–1
Spartaks Jūrmala	0–2	2–4	1–3		0–0			0–3		
Ventspils	0–0		2–0	6–1			3–0		3–0	

Source: LFF
Legend: Blue = home team win; Yellow = draw; Red = away team win.

== Season statistics ==
=== Top scorers ===
As of 9 November 2013

Rank	Player	Club	Goals
1	(Latvia) Artūrs Karašausks	Skonto FC	16
1	(Latvia) Andrejs Kovaļovs	FC Daugava	16
2	(Latvia) Valērijs Šabala	Skonto FC	15
3	(Lithuania) Mantas Savėnas	Daugava Rīga	12
3	(Russia) Vadim Yanchuk	FK Ventspils	12
4	(Latvia) Daniils Turkovs	FK Ventspils	11
5	(Lithuania) Povilas Lukšys	Daugava Rīga	10

== Player of the Month ==
Month	Player	Club
March/April	(Lithuania) Mantas Savenas	FK Daugava Rīga
May	(Ghana) Patrick Twumasi	FK Spartaks Jūrmala
June	(Latvia) Andrejs Kovaļovs	FC Daugava
July	(Lithuania) Paulius Grybauskas	Skonto FC
August	(Turkmenistan) Ruslan Mingazow	Skonto FC
September	(Latvia) Juris Laizāns	Skonto FC
October/November	(Latvia) Kaspars Ikstens	FK Jelgava

== Manager of the Month ==
Month	Manager	Club
March/April	(Lithuania) Virginijus Liubšys	FK Daugava Rīga
May	(Latvia) Jurģis Pučinsks	FK Ventspils
June	(Georgia (country)) Tamaz Pertia	Skonto FC
July	(Latvia) Jurģis Pučinsks	FK Ventspils
August	(Latvia) Jurģis Pučinsks	FK Ventspils
September	(Latvia) Sergejs Golubevs	FK Jelgava
October/November	(Latvia) Jurģis Pučinsks	FK Ventspils

== Team of the Tournament ==
=== LFF version ===
Position	Player	Club
Goalkeeper	(Lithuania) Paulius Grybauskas	Skonto FC
Defender	(Latvia) Antons Kurakins	FK Ventspils
Defender	(Latvia) Vitālijs Smirnovs	FK Ventspils
Defender	(Latvia) Nauris Bulvītis	Skonto FC
Defender	(Latvia) Vladislavs Gabovs	Skonto FC
Midfielder	(Latvia) Jurijs Žigajevs	FK Ventspils
Midfielder	(Latvia) Aleksandrs Fertovs	Skonto FC
Midfielder	(Latvia) Juris Laizāns	Skonto FC
Midfielder	(Turkmenistan) Ruslan Mingazov	Skonto FC
Forward	(Russia) Vadim Yanchuk	FK Ventspils
Forward	(Latvia) Valērijs Šabala	Skonto FC
Manager	(Latvia) Jurģis Pučinsks	FK Ventspils

=== Sporta Avīze version ===
Position	Player	Club
Goalkeeper	(Lithuania) Paulius Grybauskas	Skonto FC
Defender	(Latvia) Vladislavs Gabovs	Skonto FC
Defender	(Latvia) Kaspars Dubra	FK Ventspils
Defender	(Latvia) Renārs Rode	Skonto FC
Midfielder	(Latvia) Jurijs Žigajevs	FK Ventspils
Midfielder	(Latvia) Valērijs Afanasjevs	FK Liepājas Metalurgs
Midfielder	(Latvia) Juris Laizāns	Skonto FC
Midfielder	(Turkmenistan) Ruslan Mingazov	Skonto FC
Midfielder	(Latvia) Andrejs Kovaļovs	FC Daugava
Forward	(Latvia) Artūrs Karašausks	Skonto FC
Forward	(Latvia) Valērijs Šabala	Skonto FC
Manager	(Georgia (country)) Tamaz Pertia	Skonto FC

=== sportacentrs.com version ===
Position	Player	Club
Goalkeeper	(Lithuania) Paulius Grybauskas	Skonto FC
Defender	(Latvia) Antons Kurakins	FK Ventspils
Defender	(Latvia) Renārs Rode	Skonto FC
Defender	(Latvia) Kaspars Dubra	FK Ventspils
Defender	(Latvia) Vladislavs Gabovs	Skonto FC
Midfielder	(Latvia) Juris Laizāns	Skonto FC
Midfielder	(Latvia) Jurijs Žigajevs	FK Ventspils
Midfielder	(Latvia) Andrejs Kovaļovs	FC Daugava
Midfielder	(Turkmenistan) Ruslan Mingazov	Skonto FC
Forward	(Latvia) Daniils Turkovs	FK Ventspils
Forward	(Latvia) Artūrs Karašausks	Skonto FC
Manager	(Latvia) Jurģis Pučinsks	FK Ventspils

== Awards ==
LFF awards 2013
Category	Winner	Club
Best goalkeeper	(Lithuania) Paulius Grybauskas	Skonto FC
Best defender	(Latvia) Vladislavs Gabovs	Skonto FC
Best midfielder	(Latvia) Jurijs Žigajevs	FK Ventspils
Best forward	(Latvia) Valērijs Šabala	Skonto FC
Top scorer	(Latvia) Artūrs Karašausks / (Latvia) Andrejs Kovaļovs	Skonto FC / FC Daugava
Best U-21 player	(Latvia) Jevgēņijs Kazačoks	FK Spartaks Jūrmala
Best player	(Latvia) Jurijs Žigajevs	FK Ventspils
Best manager	(Latvia) Jurģis Pučinsks	FK Ventspils
Goal of the season	(Latvia) Jurijs Žigajevs vs FK Spartaks Jūrmala	FK Ventspils
Fair play award	Club award	FC Jūrmala
Best match organisation	Club award	FK Liepājas Metalurgs
