= List of Latvian football transfers summer 2015 =

This is a list of Latvian football transfers in the 2015 summer transfer window by club. Only transfers of the Virslīga are included.

All transfers mentioned are shown in the references at the bottom of the page. If you wish to insert a transfer that isn't mentioned there, please add a reference.

== Latvian Higher League ==
=== Ventspils ===
In: Note: Flags indicate national team as defined under FIFA eligibility rules; some limited exceptions apply. Players may hold more than one non-FIFA nationality.

No.	Pos.	Nation	Player
—	DF	SRB	Nikola Boranijašević (from (Serbia) Borac Čačak)
—	MF	LVA	Vadims Žuļevs (from (Hungary) Lombard-Pápa)
—	MF	LVA	Oļegs Laizāns (from (Russia) Yenisey Krasnoyarsk)

Out: Note: Flags indicate national team as defined under FIFA eligibility rules; some limited exceptions apply. Players may hold more than one non-FIFA nationality.

No.	Pos.	Nation	Player
3	DF	LVA	Antons Kurakins (to (Scotland) Hamilton Academical)
6	MF	LVA	Dāvis Indrāns (to Skonto)
11	FW	MTN	Cheikh Diagne (released)

=== Skonto ===
In: Note: Flags indicate national team as defined under FIFA eligibility rules; some limited exceptions apply. Players may hold more than one non-FIFA nationality.

No.	Pos.	Nation	Player
—	DF	BRA	Victor Rocha (from (Brazil) Desportivo Brasil)
—	DF	RUS	Artyom Kulesha (from (Russia) Znamya Truda Orekhovo-Zuyevo)
—	DF	SCO	Garry Kenneth (from (Australia) Adamstown Rosebud)
—	MF	LVA	Andrejs Kovaļovs (on loan from (Moldova) Dacia Chișinău)
—	MF	CMR	Serge Tatiefang (from (Lithuania) MRU Vilnius)
—	MF	LVA	Dāvis Indrāns (from Ventspils)
—	FW	UKR	Ivan Lukanyuk (from BFC Daugavpils)
—	FW	NGA	Abubakar Mikail Olawale (from Compact.lv)

Out: Note: Flags indicate national team as defined under FIFA eligibility rules; some limited exceptions apply. Players may hold more than one non-FIFA nationality.

No.	Pos.	Nation	Player
8	MF	LTU	Mindaugas Kalonas (to (Azerbaijan) Ravan Baku)
12	MF	LVA	Alekss Regža (to Caramba/Dinamo)
13	DF	RUS	Maxim Usanov (released)
17	FW	COL	Yarleison Mosquera (released)
28	MF	LVA	Artūrs Pallo (to Jelgava)

=== Jelgava ===
In: Note: Flags indicate national team as defined under FIFA eligibility rules; some limited exceptions apply. Players may hold more than one non-FIFA nationality.

No.	Pos.	Nation	Player
—	MF	LVA	Andrejs Kiriļins (from (Slovakia) ViOn Zlaté Moravce)
—	MF	LVA	Artūrs Pallo (from Skonto)
—	FW	RUS	Vyacheslav Sushkin (from (Russia) Fakel Voronezh)

Out: Note: Flags indicate national team as defined under FIFA eligibility rules; some limited exceptions apply. Players may hold more than one non-FIFA nationality.

No.	Pos.	Nation	Player
11	MF	LVA	Vadims Avdejevs (to Rīgas Futbola skola)
27	DF	CYP	Andreas Themistocleous (to (Cyprus) Ermis Aradippou)
29	FW	LVA	Edgars Kārkliņš (released)

=== Liepāja ===
In: Note: Flags indicate national team as defined under FIFA eligibility rules; some limited exceptions apply. Players may hold more than one non-FIFA nationality.

No.	Pos.	Nation	Player
—	GK	LVA	Pāvels Doroševs (from (Azerbaijan) Neftchi)
—	DF	LVA	Oskars Kļava (from (Azerbaijan) AZAL)
—	DF	LVA	Deniss Ivanovs (from (Hungary) Nyíregyháza Spartacus)
—	DF	LVA	Vitālijs Maksimenko (from (England) Brighton & Hove Albion)
—	MF	ARG	Martin Mercau (from (Argentina) Club Lautaro Roncedo)
—	FW	LVA	Vladimirs Kamešs (from (Poland) Pogoń Szczecin)

Out: Note: Flags indicate national team as defined under FIFA eligibility rules; some limited exceptions apply. Players may hold more than one non-FIFA nationality.

No.	Pos.	Nation	Player
2	DF	LVA	Vitālijs Maksimenko (to (Austria) SV Mattersburg)

=== Spartaks ===
In: Note: Flags indicate national team as defined under FIFA eligibility rules; some limited exceptions apply. Players may hold more than one non-FIFA nationality.

No.	Pos.	Nation	Player
—	GK	LVA	Aleksandrs Koliņko (from (Russia) Baltika Kaliningrad)
—	MF	GER	Tyrone Aboagye (from (Germany) VfR Neumünster)
—	FW	GHA	Ferdinand Takyi (from (England) Farnborough)
—	FW	LVA	Edgars Gauračs (loan return from (Switzerland) Aarau)

Out: Note: Flags indicate national team as defined under FIFA eligibility rules; some limited exceptions apply. Players may hold more than one non-FIFA nationality.

No.	Pos.	Nation	Player
11	FW	KAZ	Sergey Gridin (to (Kazakhstan) Okzhetpes)
25	FW	NGA	Ahmed Abdultaofik (to (Sweden) Ljungskile)
39	MF	LVA	Raivis Vītolnieks (to Tukums 2000)

=== BFC Daugavpils ===
In: Note: Flags indicate national team as defined under FIFA eligibility rules; some limited exceptions apply. Players may hold more than one non-FIFA nationality.

No.	Pos.	Nation	Player
—	DF	UKR	Dmytro Makhniev (from (Ukraine) Stal Dniprodzerzhynsk)
—	DF	LVA	Mārtiņš Rubļevskis (from Ilūkstes NSS)
—	MF	LVA	Oskars Romansevičs (from Ilūkstes NSS)
—	MF	LVA	Vladislavs Fjodorovs (loan return from (Poland) Lech Poznań II)
—	FW	FRA	Dieu-Donne Nzembani-Biaka (from (Malta) St. George's)

Out: Note: Flags indicate national team as defined under FIFA eligibility rules; some limited exceptions apply. Players may hold more than one non-FIFA nationality.

No.	Pos.	Nation	Player
9	FW	UKR	Ivan Lukanyuk (to Skonto)
13	FW	LVA	Sergejs Vasiļjevs (to METTA/LU)
14	FW	LVA	Aleksandrs Guzlajevs (to (Germany) FSV Zwickau)
28	MF	FRA	Yann Goueguel (released)
30	MF	POR	Miguel Cid (loan return to (Portugal) Boavista)
97	FW	LVA	Daniels Jakovļevs (to (Italy) Perugia Calcio)

=== METTA/LU ===
In: Note: Flags indicate national team as defined under FIFA eligibility rules; some limited exceptions apply. Players may hold more than one non-FIFA nationality.

No.	Pos.	Nation	Player
—	GK	LVA	Jānis Skābardis (from Auda)
—	GK	USA	Lucas Paseiro (from Riga United)
—	DF	LVA	Klāvs Bāliņš (from (Germany) Borussia Monchengladbach U-19)
—	DF	CIV	Ismael Guiti (from (Czech Republic) Písek)
—	MF	LVA	Mārtiņš Bojārs (from Rīnūži)
—	MF	LVA	Vadims Kušņerjovs (from Šitika Futbola skola)
—	FW	CIV	Elie Moises Akui N'Dekre (from (France) Olympique Saumur)
—	FW	LVA	Sergejs Vasiļjevs (from BFC Daugavpils)

Out: Note: Flags indicate national team as defined under FIFA eligibility rules; some limited exceptions apply. Players may hold more than one non-FIFA nationality.

No.	Pos.	Nation	Player
5	DF	LVA	Deniss Petrenko (to Rīgas Futbola skola)
20	DF	LVA	Romāns Rožkovskis (to Rīgas Futbola skola)
21	MF	LVA	Andrejs Siņicins (released)
22	DF	LVA	Edijs Joksts (to (Norway) Elverum Fotball)
29	FW	LVA	Maksims Daņilovs (released)
31	GK	LVA	Oskars Darģis (to Auda)
45	DF	LVA	Dāvis Daugavietis (to Alberts)
92	MF	LVA	Māris Riherts (released)

=== Gulbene ===
In: Note: Flags indicate national team as defined under FIFA eligibility rules; some limited exceptions apply. Players may hold more than one non-FIFA nationality.

No.	Pos.	Nation	Player

Out: Note: Flags indicate national team as defined under FIFA eligibility rules; some limited exceptions apply. Players may hold more than one non-FIFA nationality.

No.	Pos.	Nation	Player
5	DF	LVA	Vladislavs Pavļučenko (to AFA Olaine)
6	MF	LVA	Dmitrijs Telešs (to AFA Olaine)
7	DF	LVA	Kirils Jeļkins (released)
8	MF	LVA	Jaroslavs Zoricovs (to AFA Olaine)
10	FW	LVA	Viktors Kurma (to Rīgas Futbola skola)
11	MF	LVA	Sergejs Mišins (released)
13	MF	LVA	Ņikita Pačko (to Rīgas Futbola skola)
15	MF	LVA	Aleksandrs Kļimovs (to AFA Olaine)
17	FW	LVA	Jānis Lapss (to Valmiera)
23	MF	LVA	Konstantīns Budilovs (to AFA Olaine)
81	GK	LVA	Marks Bogdanovs (to AFA Olaine)
