= 2012–13 Latvian Football Cup =

Tournament details
- Country: Latvia
- Teams: 22

Final positions
- Champions: Ventspils
- Runners-up: Liepājas Metalurgs

The 2012–13 Latvian Football Cup was the 18th edition of the Latvian football knockout tournament. The winners, FK Ventspils, qualify for the first qualifying round of the 2013–14 UEFA Europa League.

== First round ==
The matches of this round took place between 3 and 13 June 2012.

Team 1	Score	Team 2
FK Valka	2–4	FK Rīnūži
FK Mērsrags	2–1	FK Tukuma Brāļi
FK Alberts	2–1 (a.e.t.)	Ludzas SK
FK Saldus	0–1	Kuldīgas BJSS

== Second round ==
Because this season the Latvian Cup had only eight teams in its first round, playing a second one was not necessary, so the first round winners received an automatic bye for the third round, where they will meet First League clubs.

== Third round ==
Entering this round were the 4 teams from the previous round and 8 teams who enter the competition in this round. The matches of this round took place between 30 June and 7 July 2012.

Team 1	Score	Team 2
SFK Varavīksne	1–2	Ilūkstes NSS
FK Mērsrags	0–10	RFS
Rēzeknes BJSS	0–1	BFC Daugava
Kuldīgas BJSS	0–1	FK Tukums 2000
FK Rīnūži	2–1	Valmieras FK
FK Alberts	0–2	FK Auda

== Fourth round ==
Entering this round were the 6 teams from the previous round and the 10 teams from the Latvian Higher League who enter the competition in this round. These matches took place on 21 and 22 July 2012.

Team 1	Score	Team 2
RFS	0–11	Daugava Daugavpils
BFC Daugava	0–3	Ventspils
Ilūkstes NSS	1–4	Gulbene 2005
FK Tukums 2000	0–6	Skonto
Jelgava	1–2	Liepājas Metalurgs
Metta/LU	1–7	FC Jūrmala
FK Auda	0–2	FK Spartaks Jūrmala
FK Rīnūži	0–6	Daugava Rīga

== Quarterfinals ==
16 March 2013
15:00 EET

Daugava Daugavpils	2–1	FC Jūrmala
Babatunde 35'; Jermolajevs 49'	Report	Belov 90+2'

Daugavas stadions, Daugavpils
Attendance: 100
Referee: Vadims Direktorenko
16 March 2013
16:00 EET

Liepājas Metalurgs	3–1	Skonto
Hmizs 21'; Ikaunieks 40'; Askarov 74'	Report	Siņeļņikovs 9'

Daugava Stadium, Liepāja
Attendance: 400
Referee: Andris Treimanis
17 March 2013
12:30 EET

FK Spartaks Jūrmala	1–1 (a.e.t.)	Ventspils
Solovjovs 53'	Report	Smirnovs 61'
Penalties
	4–5

Slokas Stadium, Jūrmala
Attendance: 200
Referee: Aleksandrs Golubevs
16 March 2013
15:30 EET

Gulbene 2005	0–7	Daugava Rīga
	Report	Tamošauskas 13'; Veliulis 22'; Surać 45', 49', 61'; Kozačuks 58'; Klimavičius 73'

Skonto halle, Riga
Attendance: 120
Referee: Mareks Ķere

== Semifinals ==
4 May 2013
14:00 EET

Ventspils	4–0	Daugava Daugavpils
Žigajevs 16', 39'; Abdultaofik 42', 70'

Ventspils Olimpiskais Stadions, Ventspils
Attendance: 300
Referee: Aleksandrs Anufrijevs
4 May 2013
15:00 EET

Daugava Rīga	1–1	Liepājas Metalurgs
Savenas 40'		Kalns 75'
Penalties
Savenas (penalty scored); Diakvishvili (penalty missed); Klimavičius (penalty scored); Kozačuks (penalty missed)	2–4	(penalty scored) Kalns; (penalty scored) Ikaunieks; (penalty scored) Jemeļins; (penalty scored) Šadčins

Daugava Stadium, Riga
Attendance: 250
Referee: Ivars Caune

== Final ==
18 May 2013
17:00 EEST

Liepājas Metalurgs	1–2 (a.e.t.)	Ventspils
Jemeļins 43'; Prohorenkovs (red card) 107'	Report	Yanchuk 72'; Dubra 93'

Skonto Stadium, Riga
Attendance: 1100
Referee: Andris Treimanis
