= Valērijs Šabala =

Latvian footballer (born 1994)

Personal information
- Date of birth: 12 October 1994 (age 32)
- Place of birth: Riga, Latvia
- Height: 1.77 m (5 ft 10 in)
- Position: Forward

Team information
- Current team: Chojniczanka Chojnice
- Number: 20

Youth career
- –2009: Daugava Rīga

Senior career*
Years	Team	Apps	(Gls)
2009	Daugava Rīga	2	(0)
2010	Olimps	21	(6)
2011–2013	Skonto Riga	77	(28)
2014–2017	Club Brugge	0	(0)
2014	→ Skonto Riga (loan)	9	(5)
2014	→ Anorthosis Famagusta (loan)	8	(0)
2015	→ Baumit Jablonec (loan)	9	(2)
2015–2016	→ Miedź Legnica (loan)	9	(3)
2016	→ Příbram (loan)	7	(2)
2016	→ DAC Dunajská Streda (loan)	13	(1)
2017	→ Riga (loan)	13	(4)
2017–2019	Podbeskidzie Bielsko-Biała	61	(21)
2019–2020	Miedź Legnica	16	(2)
2019–2020	Miedź Legnica II	2	(0)
2020–2021	Sūduva	13	(4)
2021	Viitorul Constanța	5	(0)
2021	GKS Bełchatów	12	(1)
2021	Liepāja	11	(2)
2022	KÍ Klaksvík	24	(5)
2023	B36 Tórshavn	26	(11)
2024–	Chojniczanka Chojnice	73	(34)

International career
2010–2011	Latvia U17	5	(0)
2011–2012	Latvia U19	13	(2)
2012–2013	Latvia U21	3	(2)
2013–2019	Latvia	53	(13)
- * Club domestic league appearances and goals as of 11:10, 31 May 2026 (UTC)

Valērijs Šabala (born 12 October 1994) is a Latvian professional footballer who plays as a forward for and captains II liga club Chojniczanka Chojnice.

== Club career ==
=== Early career ===
As a youth player, Šabala was a member of Daugava Rīga academy. With the club winning the 2008 Latvian First League and being promoted to the Latvian Higher League for the 2009 season, Šabala was one of the youngsters to be included in the first team squad by the manager Vladimirs Beļajevs. Šabala made his debut on 15 October 2009, having just turned 15, when he came on as a substitute in the 46th minute in an 8–0 loss against the defending champions FK Ventspils. Three days later, he appeared in the match against FC Tranzit, coming on as a substitute in the 88th minute. After Daugava Rīga were relegated to the Latvian First League, Šabala joined the Latvian Higher League newcomers JFK Olimps in January 2010. Šabala scored his first Latvian Higher League goal on 23 April 2010 in a match against Skonto Riga. At the time he was 15 years and 193 days old, which made him the youngest ever goalscorer in the history of Latvian championship and all the top tier European football leagues. His record was broken on 10 June 2014, when Skonto Riga midfielder Jānis Grīnbergs scored a penalty against Daugava Daugavpils being just 15 years and 102 days old. Throughout the season, Šabala appeared in 21 league matches and scored six goals.

=== Skonto Riga ===
In February 2011, Šabala joined that time Latvian Higher League champions Skonto Riga. In his debut season with the club. he was rarely used in the first eleven and often came on as a substitute, scoring two goals in 22 matches. Šabala scored his first league goal for Skonto on 25 September 2011 against his former club JFK Olimps. Despite the limited playing time, he was named Young Player of the Year and received the Ilmārs Liepiņš prize. Throughout the season, Šabala went on short-term trials with Arsenal, Watford and Udinese.

In January 2012, Šabala went on trial with Ukrainian Premier League club Dynamo Kyiv alongside his international teammate Vitālijs Jagodinskis, but eventually returned to Skonto with only the latter signing a contract. On 30 June 2012, Šabala scored his first hat-trick in a league match against FS Metta/LU at the age of 17 years, 8 months and 18 days. On 10 July, he was named the best Latvian Higher League player in June. In September, Šabala went on trial at Russian Premier League club CSKA Moscow and played in their friendly match against Lokomotiv-2 Moscow. In November, information appeared in the media that CSKA Moscow were ready to offer Skonto 3.5 million euros for the player, but eventually the move did not occur. Šabala finished the 2012 season as the 5th top scorer of the league with 11 goals. In December, he received the Ilmārs Liepiņš prize as the Young Player of the Year for the second season in a row.

In the 2013 season, Šabala scored 15 league goals, coming one goal short to his teammate Artūrs Karašausks and Daugava player Andrejs Kovaļovs, who both became the top scorers of the league with 16 goals each. On 18 July, Šabala helped Skonto beat the Czech club Slovan Liberec 2–1 at home in the UEFA Europa League second qualifying round, scoring the first goal. He was included in the LFF and sportacentrs.com Latvian Higher League Team of the Tournament and named the best forward of the season. Skonto confirmed having received concrete offers for the player from the Turkish Süper Lig club Trabzonspor, Italian Serie A club Hellas Verona and Belgian Pro League club Club Brugge.

=== Club Brugge ===
On 29 January 2014, Šabala joined Belgian Pro League club Club Brugge, signing a contract until 30 June 2018. In order to get immediate playing time, he was loaned back to Skonto until 1 July 2014. During the loan spell, Šabala appeared in nine league matches and scored five goals. Having spent the pre-season preparation period with Club Brugge, Šabala was sent out on another loan to Cypriot First Division club Anorthosis Famagusta on 22 August 2014.

=== Podbeskidzie Bielsko-Biała ===
After loan stints in Poland, the Czech Republic, Slovakia and Latvia, on 4 August 2017, Šabala signed a two-year contract with I liga side Podbeskidzie Bielsko-Biała. He became the top scorer of the 2018–19 I liga season, scoring 12 goals.

== International career ==
Šabala was a member of all international youth teams and made his debut for the Latvia senior team on 24 May 2013 in a friendly match against Qatar. In the next match, he scored his first goals for the national team, scoring twice in a friendly against Turkey, becoming the youngest ever international goal scorer for Latvia. His first official qualifier match was the 2014 World Cup qualifying match against Bosnia and Herzegovina.

== Career statistics ==
=== Club ===
As of 16 July 2014

Appearances and goals by club, season and competition
Club	Season	League			National cup (Note: Includes Latvian Cup)		Europe		Other (Note: Includes Baltic League, Latvian Supercup)		Total	
Club	Season	Division	Apps	Goals	Apps	Goals	Apps	Goals	Apps	Goals	Apps	Goals
FK Daugava	2009	Virsliga	2	0	0	0	0	0	0	0	2	0
JFK Olimps	2010	Virsliga	21	6	0	0	0	0	1	0	22	6
Skonto FC	2010	Virsliga	0	0	0	0	0	0	3	1	3	1
Skonto FC	2011	Virsliga	22	2	1	0	2 (Note: Appearances in UEFA Champions League)	0	0	0	25	2
Skonto FC	2012	Virsliga	31	11	4	0	2 (Note: Appearances in UEFA Europa League)	0	0	0	37	11
Skonto FC	2013	Virsliga	24	15	4	3	4	1	0	0	32	19
Skonto FC	2014	Virsliga	9	5	0	0	0	0	0	0	9	5
Skonto FC	Total		86	33	9	3	8	1	3	1	106	38
Career total			109	39	9	3	8	1	4	1	130	44

=== International ===
Appearances and goals by national team and year
National team	Year	Apps	Goals
Latvia
Latvia	2013	8	3
Latvia	2014	7	3
Latvia	2015	7	2
Latvia	2016	8	2
Latvia	2017	10	3
Latvia	2018	11	0
Latvia	2019	2	0
Total		53	13

Scores and results list Latvia's goal tally first, score column indicates score after each Šabala goal.

List of international goals scored by Valērijs Šabala
No.	Date	Venue	Opponent	Score	Result	Competition
1	28 May 2013	Schauinsland-Reisen-Arena, Duisburg, Germany	Turkey	2–3	3–3	Friendly
2	28 May 2013	Schauinsland-Reisen-Arena, Duisburg, Germany	Turkey	3–3	3–3	Friendly
3	15 October 2013	Skonto Stadium, Riga, Latvia	Slovakia	1–2	2–2	2014 FIFA World Cup qualification
4	3 September 2014	Skonto Stadium, Riga, Latvia	Armenia	1–0	2–0	Friendly
5	3 September 2014	Skonto Stadium, Riga, Latvia	Armenia	2–0	2–0	Friendly
6	13 October 2014	Skonto Stadium, Riga, Latvia	Turkey	1–1	1–1	UEFA Euro 2016 qualification
7	3 September 2015	Torku Arena, Konya, Turkey	Turkey	1–1	1–1	UEFA Euro 2016 qualification
8	10 October 2015	Laugardalsvöllur, Reykjavík, Iceland	Iceland	2–2	2–2	UEFA Euro 2016 qualification
9	29 March 2016	Victoria Stadium, Gibraltar	Gibraltar	3–0	5–0	Friendly
10	6 September 2016	Estadi Nacional, Andorra la Vella, Andorra	Andorra	1–0	1–0	2018 FIFA World Cup qualification
11	10 October 2017	Skonto Stadium, Riga, Latvia	Andorra	2–0	4–0	2018 FIFA World Cup qualification
12	10 October 2017	Skonto Stadium, Riga, Latvia	Andorra	3–0	4–0	2018 FIFA World Cup qualification
13	13 November 2017	Adem Jashari Olympic Stadium, Mitrovica, Kosovo	Kosovo	2–1	3–4	Friendly

== Honours ==
Skonto

- Latvian Cup: 2011–12
- Baltic League: 2010–11

KÍ Klaksvik

- Faroe Islands Premier League: 2022

Latvia

- Baltic Cup: 2014, 2016, 2018

Individual

- Latvian Higher League Young Player of the Year: 2011, 2012
- Latvian Higher League Forward of the Season: 2013
- I liga top scorer: 2018–19
- Polish Cup top scorer: 2025–26
