= Antons Kurakins =

Latvian footballer

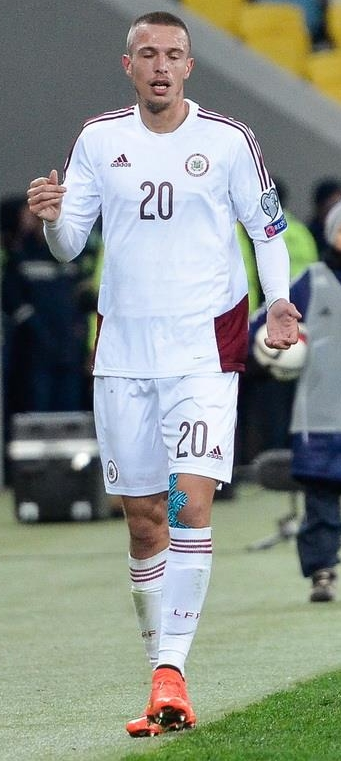

Personal information
- Full name: Antons Kurakins
- Date of birth: 1 January 1990 (age 36)
- Place of birth: Rīga, Latvia
- Height: 1.82 m (5 ft 11 1/2 in)
- Position: Left back

Senior career*
Years	Team	Apps	(Gls)
2006	Multibanka Rīga		
2007	RSK Dižvanagi Rēzekne		
2008	FK Blāzma Rēzekne	30	(0)
2008–2011	Celtic	0	(0)
2009–2010	→ Brechin City (loan)	2	(0)
2010–2011	→ Stranraer FC (loan)	19	(0)
2011–2015	FK Ventspils	76	(3)
2015–2016	Hamilton Academical	36	(0)
2017–2022	Riga FC	102	(3)

International career^{‡}
2014–2015	Latvia	8	(0)
- * Club domestic league appearances and goals as of 16:05, 20 December 2022 (UTC) ‡ National team caps and goals as of 8 November 2017

Antons Kurakins (born 1 January 1990) is a Latvian professional footballer who played as a defender for Riga FC and the Latvia national football team.

== Career ==
After starting his career in his home country with Multibanka Rīga, RSK Dižvanagi Rēzekne and FK Blāzma Rēzekne Kurakins then moved to Scotland, signing for Celtic, where he played in the club's youth side. During his time at Celtic, he went out on loan to Brechin City in April 2010 and to Stranraer in February 2011.

After a spell with FK Ventspils, Kurakins returned to Scotland in July 2015, signing for Hamilton Academical. He was released by the club on 24 August 2016. He then returned to Latvia, where he spent several months training with Riga FC, and joined the club in 2017. Kurakins stayed with the club for five seasons, departing at the end of the 2022 season.

== International career ==
Kurakins made his first international appearance in a friendly against Macedonia on 5 March 2014, playing the entire match.

== Honours ==
Club

Ventspils

- Virslīga (2): 2013, 2014
- Latvian Cup (1): 2012–13

National Team

- Baltic Cup (2): 2014, 2016
