= Kaspars Dubra =

Latvian footballer (born 1990)

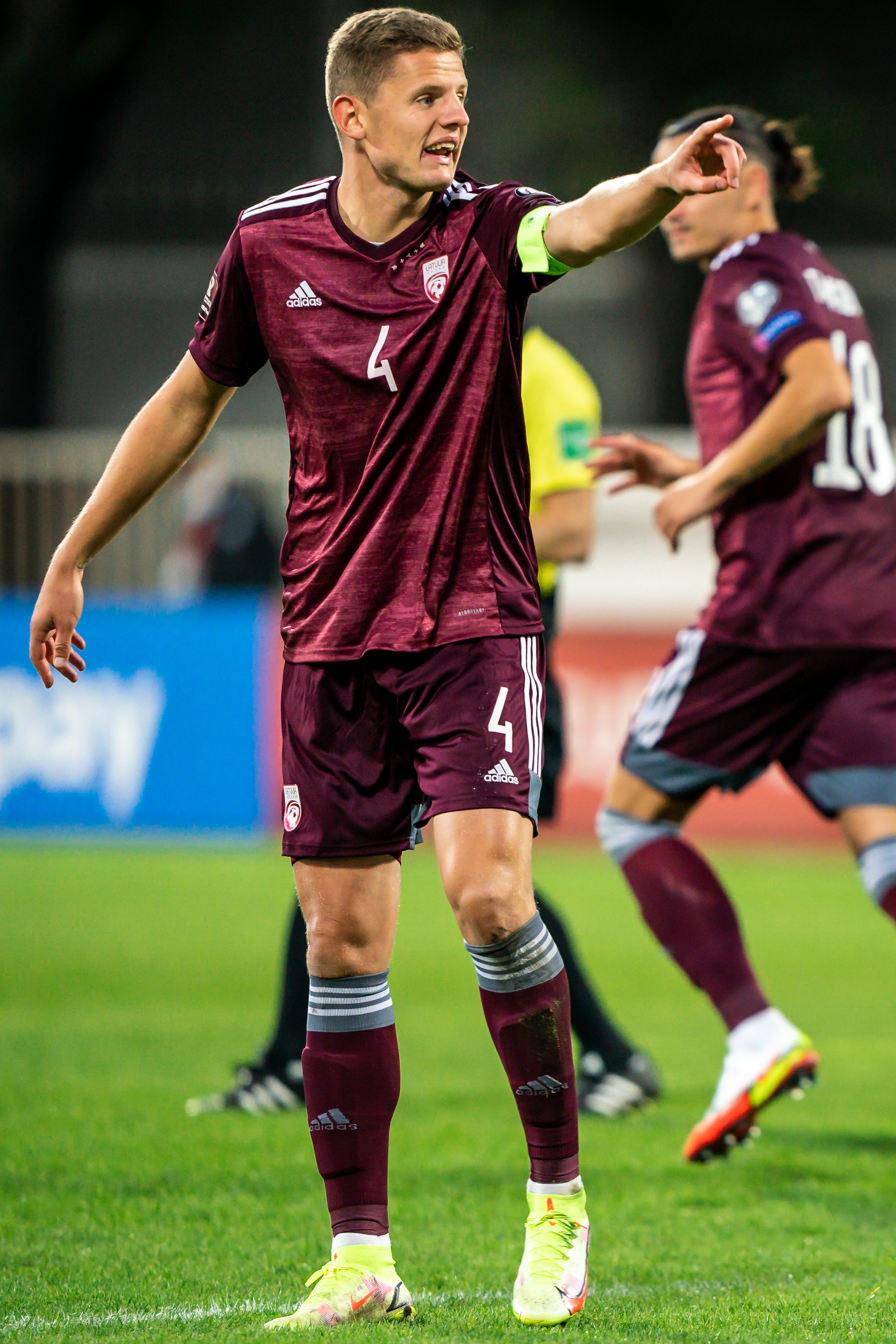

Personal information
- Full name: Kaspars Dubra
- Date of birth: 20 December 1990 (age 35)
- Place of birth: Riga, Latvian SSR, Soviet Union
- Height: 1.90 m (6 ft 3 in)
- Position: Centre back

Youth career
- 1997–2007: Skonto Riga

Senior career*
Years	Team	Apps	(Gls)
2007–2012	Skonto Riga	26	(6)
2008	→ Olimps (loan)	25	(2)
2009	→ Olimps (loan)	9	(1)
2012	Polonia Bytom	4	(0)
2012–2014	Ventspils	80	(7)
2015–2017	BATE Borisov	42	(5)
2017–2018	RFS	34	(4)
2019	Irtysh Pavlodar	12	(0)
2019–2022	Oleksandriya	57	(2)
2022–2023	RFS	21	(0)
2023–2024	Panevėžys	46	(4)

International career^{‡}
2007–2010	Latvia U19	8	(2)
2009–2012	Latvia U21	10	(1)
2013	Latvia U23	2	(1)
2010–2024	Latvia	66	(3)
- * Club domestic league appearances and goals as of 18 February 2025 ‡ National team caps and goals as of 20 December 2024

Kaspars Dubra (born 20 December 1990) is a Latvian former professional footballer who played as a defender for the Latvia national team.

== Club career ==
=== Skonto Riga ===
Dubra started playing football at the age of seven, as a youth player he played for Skonto Riga academy JFC Skonto. In 2007, he was taken to the first team by that time manager Paul Ashworth, but didn't appear on the pitch that season.

Before the start of the 2008 season Dubra was loaned out to another Latvian Higher League club located in Riga JFK Olimps. He played 25 matches through the season and managed to score twice. In 2009 Dubra was taken back to Skonto, but, playing only one match, was once again loaned to Olimps, playing 9 games and scoring once during this loan spell.

In 2010, Dubra was one of several Olimps players to be taken to Skonto by the club's new manager Aleksandrs Starkovs. Dubra made a surprisingly good impact and earned himself a place in the starting line-up right after joining. Being one of the best defenders in the league during the season, all in all he made 19 appearances and scored 5 goals for Skonto and helped his team become the champions of Latvian Higher League. In July 2010 he was named the best player of the month, being the only defender to receive this award during the season. At the end of the season he was included in the team of the tournament. In November 2010 Dubra went on trial with the English Premier League club Blackpool.

In 2011, Dubra suffered from a serious injury and managed to return to the pitch only at the end of the season, playing only 6 league matches. On 1 January his contract with Skonto Riga expired, and Kaspars went on trial with the English Premier League club Wolverhampton Wanderers, Kaspars has left a good impression on Mick McCarthy coach of Wolverhampton Wanderers, but his agent couldn't agree on a deal.

=== Polonia Bytom ===
Being linked with several Polish, Russian and Ukrainian clubs, Dubra signed with Polish I liga club Polonia Bytom for a one-and-a-half-year contract with them in February 2012. After playing just 4 league games in July 2012 he terminated the contract with Polonia Bytom.

=== FK Ventspils ===
In July 2012, he joined the Latvian Higher League club FK Ventspils. He signed a contract till June 2015.

In May 2013, Dubra scored a goal against FK Liepājas Metalurgs and brought victory in the cup final in Latvia.

=== Irtysh Pavlodar ===
On 4 January 2019, Dubra joined Kazakh club FC Irtysh Pavlodar. On 3 July 2019, Dubra was released by Irtysh Pavlodar.

=== FK Panevėžys ===
On 17 June 2023, Dubra joined Lithuanian club Panevėžys, on a contract until 31 December 2024.

== International career ==
Dubra was a member of Latvia. He also played for Latvia U-21 and Latvia U-19. Kaspars was firstly called up to Latvia national football team by coach Aleksandrs Starkovs for a friendly match in Kunming against China on 17 November 2010. He made his debut, being just 19 years old, coming on as a substitute in the 90th minute. Kaspars played all game against Lithuania in Baltic Cup 2014 final. Latvia won the Baltic Cup.

== Career statistics ==
As of 22 June 2018

Club performance			League		Cup		Continental		Other		Total	
Club	Season	League	Apps	Goals	Apps	Goals	Apps	Goals	Apps	Goals	Apps	Goals
Olimps (loan)	2008	Virslīga	25	2	—		1	0	—		26	2
Olimps (loan)	2009	Virslīga	9	1	—		—		—		9	1
Olimps (loan)	Total		34	3	—		1	0	—		35	3
Skonto	2009	Virslīga	1	0	—		—		—		1	0
Skonto	2010	Virslīga	19	6	—		2	0	3 (Note: Appearance(s) in Baltic League)	1	24	8
Skonto	2011	Virslīga	6	0	—		—		2 (Note: Appearance(s) in Baltic Champions Cup)	0	8	0
Skonto	Total		25	6	—		2	0	5	1	32	8
Polonia Bytom	2011–12	I liga	4	0	—		—		—		4	0
Ventspils	2012	Virslīga	17	0	—		—		—		17	0
Ventspils	2013	Virslīga	27	4	3	1	6	0	—		36	5
Ventspils	2014	Virslīga	36	3	2	1	2	0	—		40	4
Ventspils	Total		80	7	5	2	8	0	—		93	9
BATE Borisov	2015	Belarusian Premier League	9	0	3	0	7	0	0	0	19	0
BATE Borisov	2016	Belarusian Premier League	16	5	1	0	2	0	1 (Note: Appearance(s) in Belarusian Super Cup)	0	20	5
BATE Borisov	Total		25	5	4	0	9	0	1	0	39	2
RFS	2017	Virslīga	11	0	2	1	—		—		13	1
RFS	2018	Virslīga	12	4	0	0	—		—		12	4
RFS	Total		23	4	2	1	—		—		25	5
Career total			192	25	11	3	20	0	6	1	229	29

=== International goals ===
Scores and results list Latvia's goal tally first.

Goal	Date	Venue	Opponent	Score	Result	Competition
1.	29 March 2016	Victoria Stadium, Gibraltar	Gibraltar	2–0	5–0	Friendly
2.	28 May 2018	LFF Stadium, Vilnius, Lithuania	Lithuania	1–0	1–1	2018 Baltic Cup
3.	11 November 2020	Stadio Olimpico, Serravalle, San Marino	San Marino	2–0	3–0	Friendly

== Honours ==
Skonto Riga

- Virsliga: 2010
- Baltic League: 2010–11

Ventspils

- Virsliga: 2013, 2014
- Latvian Cup: 2012–13

BATE Borisov

- Belarusian Premier League: 2015, 2016
- Belarusian Cup: 2014–15
- Belarusian Super Cup: 2015, 2016

Panevėžys

- A Lyga: 2023
- Lithuanian Supercup: 2024

Latvia

- Baltic Cup: 2014, 2018

=== Individual ===
- Latvian Higher League Player of the Month: June 2010
- Latvian Higher League Best Defender: 2014
