= FK Zibens/Zemessardze =

Latvian football club

- Full name: Futbola klubs Zibens/Zemessardze
- Founded: 1998
- Dissolved: 2009
- Ground: Ilūkstes stadions, Ilūkste, Latvia

FK Zibens/Zemessardze (before 2007 – Dinaburg-Zemessardze) is a former Latvian football team from the town of Ilūkste.

== History and former names ==
- Dilar Ilūkste
- FK Ilūkste
- Celtnieks Ilūkste ("Builder Ilūkste")
- FK Zibens/Zemessardze
- Dinaburg-Zemessardze

Before the 2006 season FK Zibens/Zemessardze merged with Dinaburg FC Reserves to become Dinaburg-Zemessardze.

In 2007 players from the Virslīga could not play in 1. līga because the team changed its name from Dinaburg-Zemessardze to FK Zibens/Zemessardze. The club's last participation in Latvian football competitions was in 2008 when it placed 8th in the Latvian First League. The club was dissolved in 2009.

== Honours ==
- Latvijas 2.līga Winner
  - 1998

== Participation in Latvian Championships ==
- 2008 –
- 2007 – 9th (1. līga)
- 2006 – 6th (1. līga)
- 2005 – Dinaburg-2 withdrew after playing nine matches, which were annulled (1. līga)
- 1992 – 12th (relegated)
- 1991 – 7th
