= Jurijs Žigajevs =

Latvian footballer

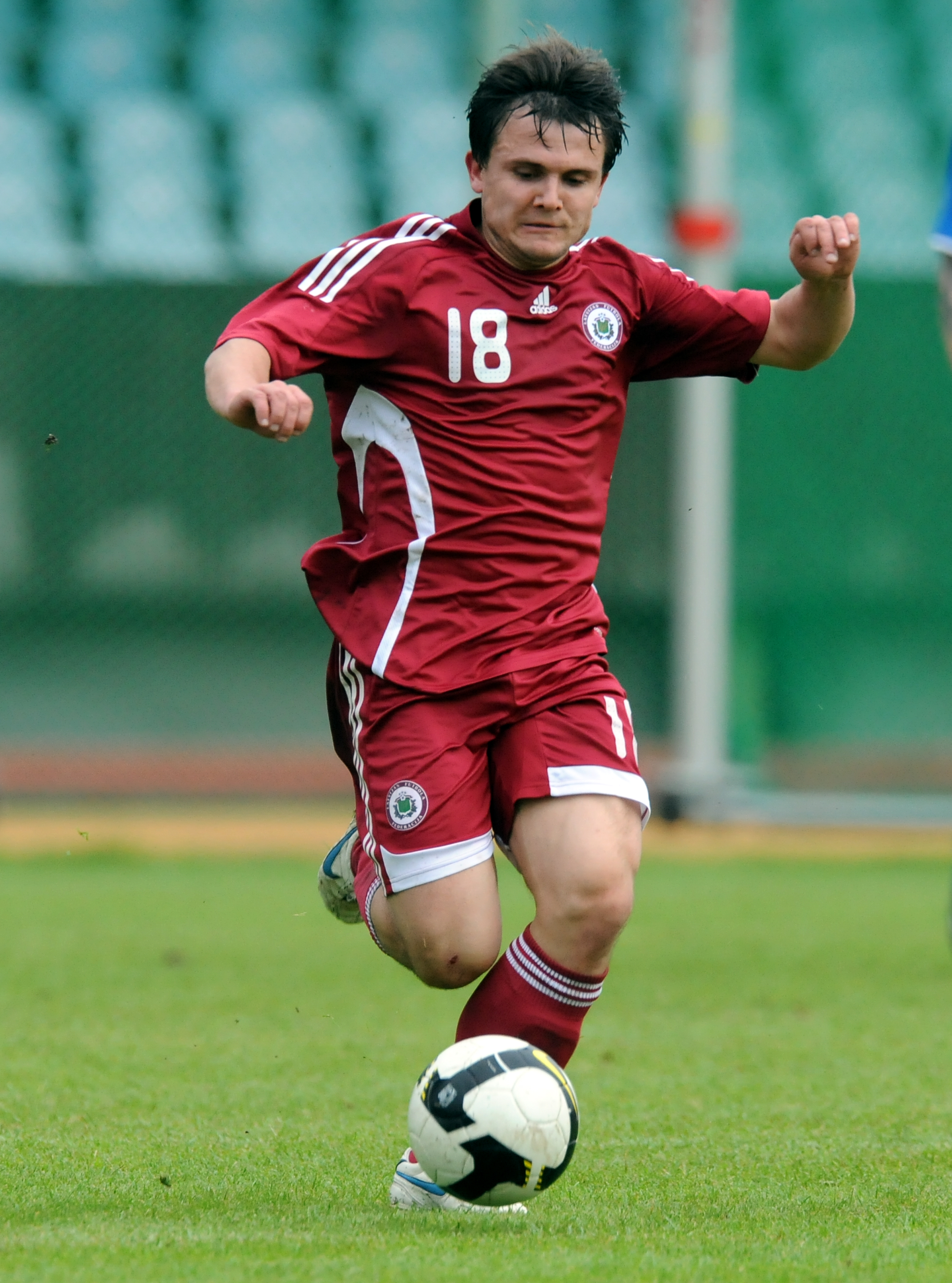

Personal information
- Full name: Jurijs Žigajevs
- Date of birth: 14 November 1985 (age 40)
- Place of birth: Leningrad, Soviet Union (now Russia)
- Height: 1.68 m (5 ft 6 in)
- Position: Winger

Team information
- Current team: Leevon PPK (chairman)

Youth career
- Ilūkste
- Zibens/Zemessardze

Senior career*
Years	Team	Apps	(Gls)
2001	Zibens/Zemessardze	1	(0)
2002–2008	Rīga	118	(17)
2008–2010	Ventspils	46	(24)
2011–2012	Widzew Łódź	5	(0)
2012–2017	Ventspils	122	(19)
2018	Spartaks Jūrmala	7	(0)
2018	Ilūkstes NSS	1	(0)
Total		300	(60)

International career
2007–2015	Latvia	31	(2)

Managerial career
- 2022–2024: FK PPK
- * Club domestic league appearances and goals

Jurijs Žigajevs (born 14 November 1985) is a Latvian professional football manager and former player who is currently the chairman of Leevon PPK. He made 31 appearances for the Latvia national team.

== Club career ==
Born in the then Leningrad, Russia Žigajevs moved to Latvia at a young age. In his youth he played for FK Ilūkste and later FK Zibens Zemessardze. In 2002, he signed a professional contract with FK Rīga, playing in the Latvian Higher League. He played there for 6 years, until 2008, making 118 appearances and scoring 17 goals. After, the club's bankrupt Žigajevs signed a contract with another Latvian Higher League club FK Ventspils. He spent 2 seasons there, playing 46 matches and scoring 24 goals. On 3 December 2010, Žigajevs joined Ekstraklasa club Widzew Łódź. Struggling with injuries all season, Žigajevs made only 5 league appearances for the Polish side and in June 2012 re-joined his former club FK Ventspils.

== International career ==
Žigajevs made his international debut for Latvia on 13 October 2007 in a 2–4 win against Iceland. He collected 31 caps and scored 2 goals. He scored his first goal in the 2010 FIFA World Cup qualification match victory against Luxembourg.

== Position ==
Žigajevs started most games as a right winger.

== International goals ==
#	Date	Venue	Opponent	Score	Result	Competition
1.	24 May 2013	Doha, Qatar	Qatar	1–3	Lost	Friendly

== Honours ==
Ventspils

- Latvian Higher League: 2008, 2013, 2014
- Latvian Cup: 2012–13, 2016–17
- Baltic League: 2009–10
