= Livonia Cup =

Football competition among the top clubs of Estonia and Latvia

- Founded: 2003
- Region: Baltic (UEFA)
- Teams: 2
- Current champions: (Latvia) Riga FC (1st title)
- Most championships: (Latvia) Skonto Riga (Estonia) Flora Tallinn (3 titles each)

The Livonia Cup (Estonian: Liivimaa karikas, Latvian: Livonijas Kauss) is an international men's association football super cup competition organised by the Estonian Football Association and the Latvian Football Federation, and contested by the reigning champions of the Meistriliiga and the Virslīga, the highest level of football league system in Estonia and Latvia, respectively.

== Winners ==
| Year | Winner | Score | Runner-up | Venue |
|---|---|---|---|---|
| 2003 | (Latvia) Skonto Riga | 2–2 (10–9 p) | (Estonia) Flora Tallinn | Skonto Hall, Riga |
| 2004 | (Latvia) Skonto Riga | 3–3 (4–3 p) | (Estonia) Flora Tallinn | Skonto Hall, Riga |
| 2005 | (Latvia) Skonto Riga | 4–3 | (Estonia) Levadia Tallinn | Skonto Hall, Riga |
| 2006 | The initial Baltic Champions Cup held instead. | | | |
| 2008 | (Latvia) Ventspils | 2–2 (4–3 p) | (Estonia) Levadia Tallinn | Olympic Sports Centre, Riga |
| 2011 | (Estonia) Flora Tallinn | 2–0 | (Latvia) Skonto Riga | Skonto Hall, Riga |
| 2018 | (Estonia) Flora Tallinn | 2–0 | (Latvia) Spartaks Jūrmala | EJL Jalgpallihall, Tallinn |
| 2023 | (Estonia) Flora Tallinn | 2–0 | (Latvia) Valmiera | EJL Jalgpallihall, Tallinn |
| 2024 | (Latvia) RFS | 3–0 | (Estonia) Flora Tallinn | LNK Sporta Parks second pitch |
| 2026 | (Latvia) Riga FC | 3–0 | (Estonia) Flora Tallinn | EJL Jalgpallihall, Tallinn |

== Trophy ==
The trophy of the tournament was made before World War II, though its origins are unknown. It was remended by Estonian goldsmith Jaak Tammist.

The original trophy features twelve shields for engraving the winners of each tournament edition. It has been initially planned that the most successful club would permanently retain the trophy once all the shields are used up.
