= Sergejs Semjonovs =

Latvian footballer and manager

Sergejs Semjonovs (born 15 March 1959) is a Latvian football manager and a former footballer. He played as a defender.

== Playing career ==
Sergejs Semjonovs was one of the most reliable defenders in Daugava Rīga coached by Jānis Skredelis in mid-1980s when the club was one of the strongest sides in the Soviet first league. He played 9 seasons with Daugava, capping 340 appearances and scoring 3 goals. After the collapse of the Soviet Union Semjonovs played for some time with a club in Poland, in 1995 he retired from playing and switched to coaching.

== Coaching career ==
In 1995 Semjonovs was appointed the second coach of Amstrig Riga (later – Daugava), after four years he left for FK Ventspils where he worked for six seasons as coach of the reserves squad. Before the 2005 Virslīga season Semjonovs was appointed head coach of FK Ventspils but in the middle of the season he left the club. He worked with the reserves of FK Rīga until middle of the 2006 season when he was selected head coach. In October 2007 when the results of FK Rīga were getting worse, there were rumours in the Latvian press that Semjonovs would be asked to leave FK Rīga, however with Semjonovs as head coach FK Rīga achieved its best placement in Virslīga so far by finishing third as the best Riga club in front of Skonto FC.
