= 1988 Latvian SSR Higher League =

Latvian football league season for the highest division

Latvian SSR Higher League
- Season: 1988

Statistics of Latvian Higher League in the 1988 season.

== Overview ==
It was contested by 16 teams, and RAF won the championship.

== League standings ==
Pos	Team	Pld	W	D	L	GF	GA	GD	Pts
1	RAF	30	19	11	0	69	18	+51	49
2	Torpedo	30	22	4	4	55	24	+31	48
3	Celtnieks Daugavpils	30	16	9	5	47	19	+28	41
4	Jurnieks	30	14	9	7	55	43	+12	37
5	Gauja	30	15	6	9	56	40	+16	36
6	Sarkanais Metalurgs	30	12	10	8	66	44	+22	34
7	VEF	30	11	10	9	40	38	+2	32
8	Apgaismes Tehnika	30	13	5	12	56	44	+12	31
9	Celtnieks Rīga	30	12	6	12	53	43	+10	30
10	Sarkanais Kvadrats	30	10	7	13	29	45	−16	27
11	Zvezda	30	10	5	15	58	55	+3	25
12	Jaunatnes izlase	30	6	10	14	33	46	−13	22
13	Zemgale Ilūkste	30	7	7	16	27	59	−32	21
14	Masinbuvetajs	30	8	4	18	37	64	−27	20
15	Aditajs	30	6	5	19	45	75	−30	17
16	Ostinieks	30	3	4	23	29	98	−69	10

Source: rsssf.com
