= Jurģis Pučinskis =

Latvian footballer and manager

Jurģis Pučinsks
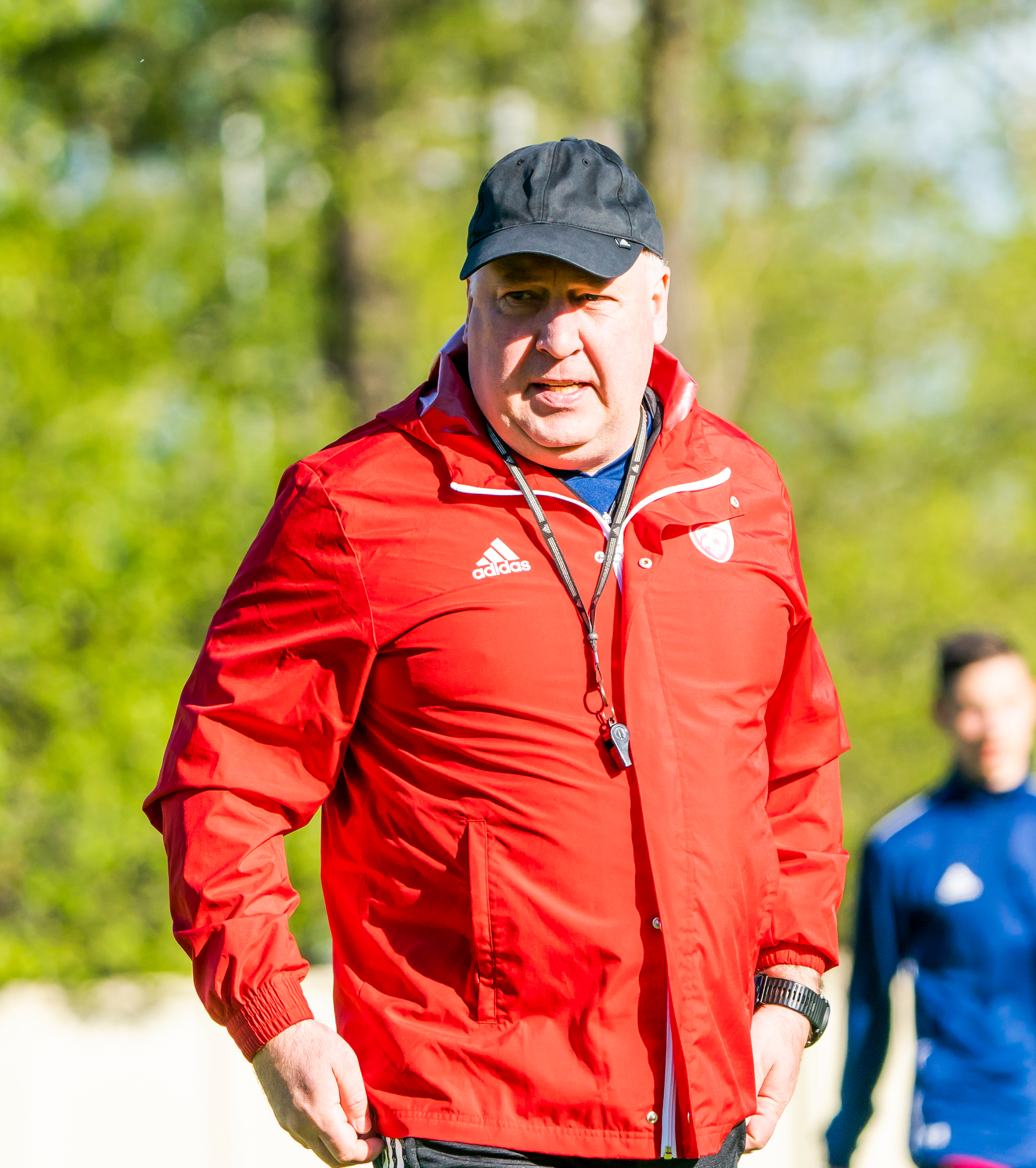

Personal information
- Full name: Jurģis Pučinsks
- Date of birth: 1 March 1973 (age 53)
- Place of birth: Daugavpils, Latvian SSR, Soviet Union
- Height: 1.70 m (5 ft 7 in)
- Position: Midfielder

Senior career*
Years	Team	Apps	(Gls)
1996–1997	Lokomotiv Daugavpils		
1998–2002	Dinaburg Daugavpils	85	(6)
2002	Metalurgs Liepāja	5	(0)
2003	Skonto FC	11	(0)
2003–2004	Dinaburg Daugavpils	8	(4)
2004	Luch-Energia Vladivostok	0	(0)
2005–2006	Dinaburg Daugavpils	45	(3)

International career^{‡}
2001–2004	Latvia	14	(0)

Managerial career
- 2006: Dinaburg Daugavpils
- 2008: Tranzit Ventspils (assistant coach)
- 2009–2012: Ventspils-2
- 2012–2016: FK Ventspils
- 2020-2022: Latvia national under-21 football team
- 2022-: Latvia national football team (assistant)
- * Club domestic league appearances and goals as of 6 July 2009 ‡ National team caps and goals as of 6 July 2009

Jurģis Pučinsks (born 3 January 1973 in Daugavpils) is a former Latvian soccer player who played as a midfielder and is now an assistant in Latvia.

He signed with Luch-Energia Vladivostok for the Russian First Division 2004 season, but did not feature in any league matches. For Latvia national football team he got 14 caps and was in squad for Euro 2004, without playing any game.
