= Dmitri Kozlov (footballer) =

Russian footballer (born 1984)

Personal information
- Full name: Dmitri Anatolyevich Kozlov
- Date of birth: 22 October 1984 (age 42)
- Place of birth: Prokhladny, Kabardino-Balkaria, RSFSR, Soviet Union (now Russian Federation)
- Height: 1.77 m (5 ft 10 in)
- Position: Forward

Youth career
- 2000–2001: Olimpia Volgograd

Senior career*
Years	Team	Apps	(Gls)
2001–2004	Olimpia Volgograd	85	(30)
2004	Rotor Volgograd	11	(1)
2005	Saturn Ramenskoye	0	(0)
2006	Spartak Lukhovitsy	5	(0)
2006–2008	Dinaburg Daugavpils	38	(15)
2007	→ Shinnik Yaroslavl (loan)	4	(0)
2009	Shakhtyor Soligorsk	1	(0)
2010	Akzhayik	12	(1)
2010–2011	Avangard Kursk	3	(0)
2011	Daugava Daugavpils	12	(2)
2011	Zimbru Chişinău	4	(0)
2012–2014	Daugava Daugavpils	30	(7)
2012–2013	→ Ilūkstes NSS (loan)	50	(21)
2015	MITOS Novocherkassk	23	(6)
- * Club domestic league appearances and goals

Dmitri Anatolyevich Kozlov (Russian: Дмитрий Анатольевич Козлов; born 22 October 1984) is a Russian former professional footballer.

== Club career ==
Kozlov has played in the Russian Premier League with FC Rotor Volgograd and in the Russian National Football League with FC Avangard Kursk.
