= 2018 Baltic Cup =

International football competition

Tournament details
- Host country: Estonia; Latvia; Lithuania
- Dates: 30 May – 5 June
- Teams: 3
- Venues: 3 (in 3 host cities)

Final positions
- Champions: Latvia (13th title)
- Runners-up: Estonia
- Third place: Lithuania

Tournament statistics
- Matches played: 3
- Goals scored: 5 (1.67 per match)
- Top scorer(s): Five players (1 goal each)

The 2018 Baltic Cup was the 27th Baltic Cup, an international football tournament contested by the Baltic states. The tournament was held between 30 May and 5 June 2018. Latvia won their 13th title.

== Standings ==
| Pos | Team | Pld | W | D | L | GF | GA | GD | Pts | |
|---|---|---|---|---|---|---|---|---|---|---|
| 1 | Latvia | 2 | 1 | 1 | 0 | 2 | 1 | +1 | 4 | Winners |
| 2 | Estonia | 2 | 1 | 0 | 1 | 2 | 1 | +1 | 3 | |
| 3 | Lithuania | 2 | 0 | 1 | 1 | 1 | 3 | −2 | 1 | |

== Matches ==
=== Estonia vs Lithuania ===
30 May 2018
19:00 (UTC+3)

| Estonia | 2–0 | Lithuania |
|---|---|---|
| Ojamaa 23'; Käit 42' | Report |

Rakvere linnastaadion, Rakvere
Attendance: 1,460
Referee: Andris Treimanis (Latvia)

=== Latvia vs Estonia ===
2 June 2018
18:00 (UTC+3)

| Latvia | 1–0 | Estonia |
|---|---|---|
| Ikaunieks 70' | Report |

Daugava Stadium, Riga
Attendance: 4,251
Referee: Manfredas Lukjančukas (Lithuania)

=== Lithuania vs Latvia ===
5 June 2018
19:00 (UTC+3)

| Lithuania | 1–1 | Latvia |
|---|---|---|
| Laukžemis 86' | Report | Dubra 46' |

LFF Stadium, Vilnius
Referee: Kristo Tohver (Estonia)

== Winners ==
2018 Baltic Football Cup winners

Latvia
Thirteenth title

== Statistics ==
=== Goalscorers ===
There were 5 goals scored in 3 matches, for an average of 1.67 goals per match.

1 goal

- (Estonia) Mattias Käit
- (Estonia) Henrik Ojamaa
- (Latvia) Kaspars Dubra
- (Latvia) Jānis Ikaunieks
- (Lithuania) Karolis Laukžemis
