= Baltic Champions Cup =

Football club tournament held between the clubs from Baltic states

The Baltic Champions Cup is a Baltic football club tournament, launched in 2006 as a spinoff of the Livonia Cup, before going on hiatus until 2011. The Champions of Estonia, Latvia and Lithuania leagues take part in the competition which is played in domed stadiums. The competition is played over three consecutive days with each club playing each other once. The winner is decided by a league table.

== Winners ==
Year	Champions	Second	Third
2006	(Lithuania) FK Ekranas	(Latvia) Metalurgs	(Estonia) TVMK Tallinn
2011	(Latvia) Skonto	(Estonia) Flora Tallinn	(Lithuania) FK Ekranas
