= Vadim Yanchuk =

Russian footballer

Personal information
- Full name: Vadim Vladimirovich Yanchuk
- Date of birth: 16 July 1982 (age 44)
- Place of birth: Leningrad, Russian SFSR
- Height: 1.77 m (5 ft 9 1/2 in)
- Position: Forward

Senior career*
Years	Team	Apps	(Gls)
2002	FC Priozyorsk		
2002	FC Pikalyovo (amateur)		
2002	PSG Gatchina		
2003	FC Petrotrest St. Petersburg	13	(0)
2003–2006	FC Sheksna Cherepovets	101	(35)
2007	FC Sibir Novosibirsk	35	(4)
2008–2009	FC Nosta Novotroitsk	60	(27)
2010	FC Kuban Krasnodar	13	(1)
2010	FC Baltika Kaliningrad	18	(2)
2011	FC Ufa	13	(1)
2011–2014	FK Ventspils	63	(32)
2014	FC Zvezda Saint Petersburg (amateur)		
- * Club domestic league appearances and goals

Vadim Vladimirovich Yanchuk (Russian: Вадим Владимирович Янчук; born 16 July 1982) is a former Russian professional football player.

== Club career ==
As a youth player Yanchuk played in his local St. Petersburg, being taken to the first team of FC Petrotrest St. Petersburg in 2003. The same year he was transferred to FC Sheksna Cherepovets, where he spent 3 years till 2006, playing more than 101 games and scoring more than 30 goals for the club. After the successful period in Cherepovets he joined FC Sibir Novosibirsk in 2007. As he couldn't fulfill the high expectations there he was given away to FC Nosta Novotroitsk - a club in a league lower level. Due to his high scoring there (27 goals in 60 matches) he was yet again transferred to a league higher-level club next year. This time he joined FC Kuban Krasnodar in 2010. Yet again expectations seemed to be a little bit too high and Yanchuk managed to score only 1 goal for the team, managing to change clubs twice the same year. Only 2 goals in 18 matches were scored by Yanchuk, playing for FC Baltika Kaliningrad, so he was yet again released and given away to FC Ufa this time, playing in the Russian Second Division. 1 goal in 13 matches and club changing was the thing that affected Yanchuk in 2011 yet again. This time he left Russia, signing for the Latvian Higher League club FK Ventspils, as the club's manager was Sergey Podpaly, with whom he had worked together while playing for FC Nosta Novotroitsk. He immediately proved his abilities and scored 12 goals in 16 matches until the end of the season. Yanchuk played for Ventspils till 1 July 2014 when his contract was terminated on a mutual agreement. All in all he played 63 matches in the Latvian Higher League and scored 32 goals, becoming the 7th all-time top scorer in the history of the FK Ventspils football club.
