= Dmitrijs Hmizs =

Latvian footballer

Personal information
- Date of birth: 31 July 1992 (age 34)
- Position: Midfielder

Team information
- Current team: Liepāja

Senior career*
Years	Team	Apps	(Gls)
2011–2013	Liepājas Metalurgs	53	(8)
2014	Spartaks Jūrmala	7	(0)
2014–	Liepāja	77	(13)

International career^{‡}
2017–	Latvia	5	(0)
- * Club domestic league appearances and goals as of 10:02, 9 August 2018 (UTC) ‡ National team caps and goals as of 10:02, 9 August 2018 (UTC)

Dmitrijs Hmizs (born 31 July 1992) is a Latvian international footballer who plays for Liepāja, as a midfielder.

== Career ==
Hmizs has played for Liepājas Metalurgs, Spartaks Jūrmala and Liepāja.

He made his international debut for Latvia in 2017.
