= Paulius Grybauskas =

Lithuanian footballer (born 1984)

Personal information
- Date of birth: 2 June 1984 (age 42)
- Place of birth: Vilnius, Lithuanian SSR, Soviet Union
- Height: 1.88 m (6 ft 2 in)
- Position: Goalkeeper

Senior career*
Years	Team	Apps	(Gls)
2003	Šviesa Vilnius	13	(0)
2004–2006	Ekranas	18	(0)
2007–2009	Oțelul Galați	14	(0)
2009–2011	Neftchi Baku	33	(0)
2011	Wigry Suwałki	6	(0)
2012	Shakhtyor Soligorsk	0	(0)
2013–2014	Skonto Riga	26	(0)
2014	Trakai	16	(0)
2015	Sūduva Marijampolė	4	(0)

International career
2005	Lithuania U21	2	(0)
2006–2010	Lithuania	6	(0)
- * Club domestic league appearances and goals

Paulius Grybauskas (born 2 June 1984) is a Lithuanian former professional footballer who played as a goalkeeper.

== Honours ==
Ekranas

- A Lyga: 2005
- Lithuanian Supercup: 2006

Oțelul Galați

- UEFA Intertoto Cup: 2007

Neftchi Baku

- Azerbaijan Premier League: 2011–12

Lithuania

- Baltic Cup: 2010
