= Vitālijs Smirnovs =

Latvian footballer

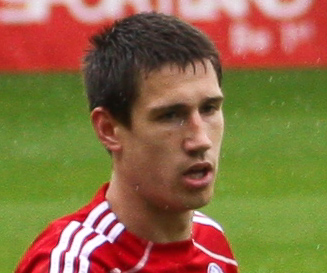
- Smirnovs playing for Skonto

Personal information
- Full name: Vitālijs Smirnovs
- Date of birth: 28 June 1986 (age 40)
- Place of birth: Jūrmala, Latvian SSR, Soviet Union (now Republic of Latvia)
- Height: 1.91 m (6 ft 3 in)
- Position: Defender

Team information
- Current team: Spartaks Jūrmala
- Number: 4

Youth career
- JFC Skonto

Senior career*
Years	Team	Apps	(Gls)
2004–2011	Skonto Riga	103	(4)
2012–2013	Ventspils	60	(6)
2014	Spartaks Jūrmala	34	(1)
2015	Skonto Riga	10	(0)
2016	Jelgava	12	(1)
2017–2018	Riga	13	(0)
2019–	Spartaks Jūrmala	3	(0)

International career
2002	Latvia U-17	3	(0)
2004	Latvia U-19	5	(0)
2007–2008	Latvia U-21	11	(0)
2010–2013	Latvia	7	(1)
- * Club domestic league appearances and goals as of 31 March 2019

Vitālijs Smirnovs (born 28 June 1986) is a Latvian footballer, who currently plays as central defender for FK Spartaks Jūrmala.

== Club career ==
=== Skonto Riga ===
As a youth player, Smirnovs played for JFC Skonto and was taken to the first team in 2004, right away becoming a champion of Latvian Higher League. In his debut season he made just one league appearance for Skonto Riga, and during the next three seasons his playing time did not increase much as Smirnovs appeared two times in the league during the 2005 season and 4 times during 2007. His chance with a considerably increasing playing time came in 2008, when Smirnovs made 16 league appearances. By 2009 he had already become a persistent first-eleven player, appearing in 25 league matches and being voted the best centre-back of the season alongside Tomas Tamošauskas, Deniss Ivanovs and David Gamezardashvili. Before the 2010 season Smirnovs was elected to be the captain of the club. That season he helped Skonto become the Latvian champions for the first time since 2004 under manager Aleksandrs Starkovs. Smirnovs was afterwards named the best defender of the season by Latvian Football Federation. In 2011 Skonto became champions of the Baltic League, beating FK Ventspils in the final, with Smirnovs scoring a penalty in the penalty shoot-out.

=== FK Ventspils ===
In January 2012, having spent eight seasons with Skonto, Smirnovs signed a contract with that time Latvian champions FK Ventspils. He was elected to be the captain of the club, having previously captained Skonto for two years. FK Ventspils finished the 2012 season as the runners-up of the league, with Smirnovs being included in the sportacentrs.com team of the tournament. In 2013 FK Ventspils became the champions of Latvia and this was Smirnovs' third Latvian Higher League title. Moreover, Ventspils also managed to lift the Latvian Football Cup. After the season Smirnovs was yet again included in the Team of the Tournament by Latvian Football Federation. He became the Iron Man of the championship, being the only player having played 90 minutes in all league matches throughout the season. In two seasons with Ventspils Smirnovs made sixty league appearances and scored six goals. He also participated in the UEFA Champions League and UEFA Europa League qualification matches. After the 2013 season Smirnovs went on an unsuccessful trial with the English Football League Championship club Blackpool.

=== Spartaks Jūrmala ===
On 6 March 2014 the Latvian Higher League club Spartaks Jūrmala announced signing of Vitālijs Smirnovs. Smirnovs played 34 league matches and scored 1 goal in the 2014 season.

== International career ==
Smirnovs was a regular member of Latvia U-17, Latvia U-19 and Latvia U-21 football teams. He was firstly called up to the senior national side for two friendly matches against South Korea and Angola in January and March 2010, but made his debut in the national team, coming on in the first eleven, in a friendly match against China on 17 November 2010. In June 2012 Smirnovs helped Latvia win the Baltic Cup, scoring the fifth goal in a 5–0 victory over Lithuania in the semi-finals on 1 June 2012 and also scoring the first penalty in the 6–5 penalty shoot-out victory over Finland in the final on 3 June 2012. As of 2015, Smirnovs has seven international caps under his name, scoring one goal.

== Honours ==
=== Skonto Riga ===
- Latvian champion
  - 2004, 2010
- Baltic League champion
  - 2011

=== FK Ventspils ===
- Latvian champion
  - 2013
- Latvian Cup winner
  - 2013

=== National team ===
- Baltic Cup winner
  - 2012

=== Individual ===
- Latvian Higher League Best Defender
  - 2009, 2010
- Latvian Higher League Iron Man (90 minutes in all league matches)
  - 2013
