= Andrejs Kovaļovs =

Latvian footballer (born 1989)

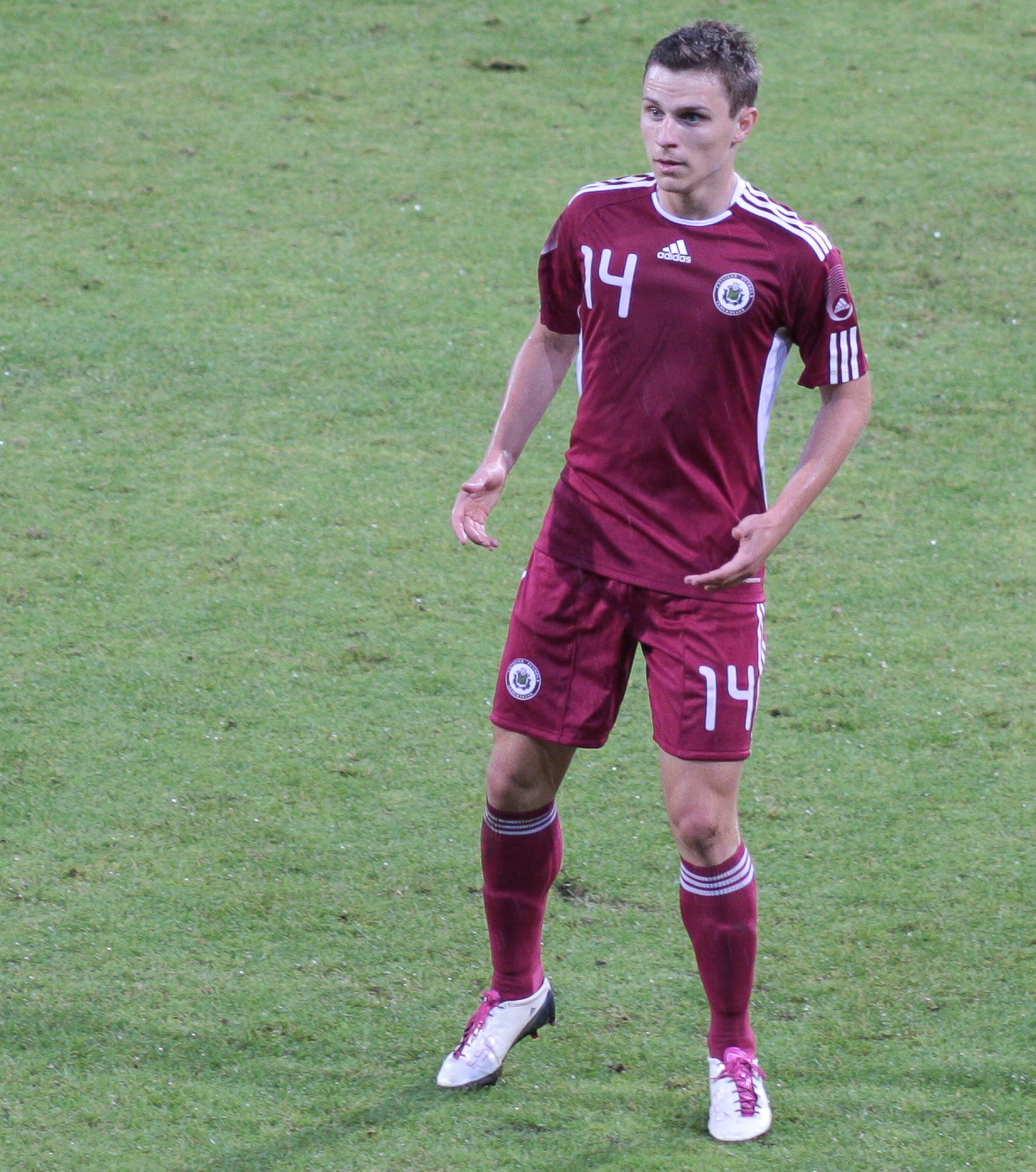
- Kovaļovs playing for Latvia

Personal information
- Date of birth: 23 March 1989 (age 37)
- Place of birth: Daugavpils, Latvian SSR, Soviet Union (now Republic of Latvia)
- Height: 1.77 m (5 ft 10 in)
- Position: Midfielder

Youth career
- 1997–2007: Daugava Daugavpils

Senior career*
Years	Team	Apps	(Gls)
2007–2013	Daugava Daugavpils	118	(27)
2014–2016	Dacia Chişinău	28	(4)
2015	→ Skonto (loan)	15	(8)
2016	→ Jelgava (loan)	26	(7)
2017	Riga	19	(1)
2018	Spartaks Jūrmala	11	(2)
2019	Vereya	6	(0)
2019–2021	BFC Daugavpils	61	(7)
Total		284	(56)

International career
2010–2014	Latvia	10	(0)
- * Club domestic league appearances and goals

Andrejs Kovaļovs (born 23 March 1989) is a Latvian former professional footballer who played as a midfielder. He also represented the Latvia national team.

== Club career ==
Born in Daugavpils, Kovaļovs started playing football in 1997, at the age of 7. He was a member of the Daugava Daugavpils youth team and played under his first managers Aleksandrs Kohans and Ēvalds Stankevičs. Developing through the youth system Kovaļovs reached the first team of Daugava Daugavpils in 2007, when he was included in the squad entry for the following season. Being just 18 years of age Kovaļovs struggled with limited playing time, appearing in just three games over the first two seasons with the club. Nonetheless, in 2008 he helped the club win the Latvian Football Cup for the first time in its history.

In 2009 his playing time grew to nine appearances and Kovaļovs managed to score his first two goals in the Latvian Higher League. In 2010 Kovaļovs became a vital player in the team's first eleven and since then till 2013 participated in 106 league matches and scored 25 goals. In 2011, he made his debut in the UEFA Europa League playing against the Norwegian club Tromsø IL. In 2012 Kovaļovs became the champion of Latvia, with Daugava winning its first ever title of the Latvian Higher League.

In 2013 they won the Latvian Supercup and became the first ever club to win it as the tournament was initially introduced that year. The 2013 season individually proved to be Kovaļovs' most successful one with the club. Scoring 16 goals in 27 matches he became the top scorer of the league and led Daugava to bronze medals in the Latvian championship. Kovaļovs was named Player of the Month in June 2013 and after the season was included in the Sporta Avīze and Sportacentrs.com teams of the season. In the nomination for the best midfielder's award he lost to Jurijs Žigajevs, but was still presented as the top scorer at the Latvian Football Federation Awards Ceremony in December 2013.

In March 2013 Kovaļovs went on trial with the Spanish La Liga club Levante UD, but did not stay with the club despite scoring twice in a friendly match. In December 2013 he was linked with a move to the Polish Ekstraklasa side Jagiellonia Białystok, but with the club's long-term hesitation to offer a contract after a successful trial period Kovaļovs voluntarily broke off the transfer talks. In February 2014 he joined the Moldovan National Division club Dacia Chişinău, signing a contract till 30 June 2016.

== International career ==
Kovaļovs made his senior international debut for Latvia on 17 November 2010, coming on as a substitute for Aleksandrs Fertovs in the 82nd minute in a friendly match against China. As of November 2014, he appeared in 10 matches with his country.

== Honours ==
- Latvian Higher League: 2012
- Latvian Cup: 2008, 2015–16
- Latvian Super Cup: 2013
- Virslīga's Winter Cup: 2013

Latvia

- Baltic Cup: 2014

Individual

- Latvian Higher League top scorer: 2013
