= Antons Jemeļins =

Latvian footballer

Personal information
- Full name: Antons Jemeļins
- Date of birth: 19 February 1984 (age 42)
- Place of birth: Liepāja, Latvian SSR, Soviet Union (now Republic of Latvia)
- Height: 1.82 m (5 ft 11 1/2 in)
- Position: Centre-back

Youth career
- Liepājas Metalurgs

Senior career*
Years	Team	Apps	(Gls)
2004–2011	Liepājas Metalurgs	95	(13)
2012	Spartaks Jūrmala	33	(12)
2013	Liepājas Metalurgs	20	(7)
2014	Tiraspol	0	(0)
2014	Atlantas	10	(2)
2015–2017	Ventspils	55	(3)
2018–2020	Liepāja	9	(0)

International career
2005–2006	Latvia U-21	4	(0)
2005–2012	Latvia	1	(0)
- * Club domestic league appearances and goals as of 20:45, 15 November 2022 (UTC)

Antons Jemeļins (born 19 February 1984 in Liepāja) is a Latvian footballer, who played as a centre-back.

== Club career ==
Jemeļins started his career with Liepājas Metalurgs in 2004. He scored one goal in the 2005 Virslīga season when the club beat FK Rīga 6-0 on 21 September 2005. He also played for Liepājas Metalurgs reserves in 2005 scoring four goals and 2006 scoring two goals.

== International career ==
Jemeļins has played for Latvia national under-21 football team. He was in the squad for the 2006 UEFA European Under-21 Football Championship qualification matches. On 2 November 2005 Jemeļins was firstly called up to Latvia national football team by manager by that time manager Jurijs Andrejevs for a friendly match against Belarus on 12 November. In May 2012 Jemeļins was re-called to the national team by the manager Aleksandrs Starkovs for the Baltic Cup matches in June. Latvia went on to win the tournament but Jemeļins remained an unused substitute during both matches.

== Honours ==
Club

- Virsliga champion: (2) 2005, 2009
- Virsliga runner-up: (5) 2004, 2006, 2007, 2008, 2011
- Moldovan National Division runner-up: (1) 2014
- Latvian Cup winner (1) 2006
- Baltic League champion: (1) 2007

National team

- Baltic Cup winner (1) 2012
