= Ilūkste =

Town in Augšdaugava Municipality, Latvia

- Town
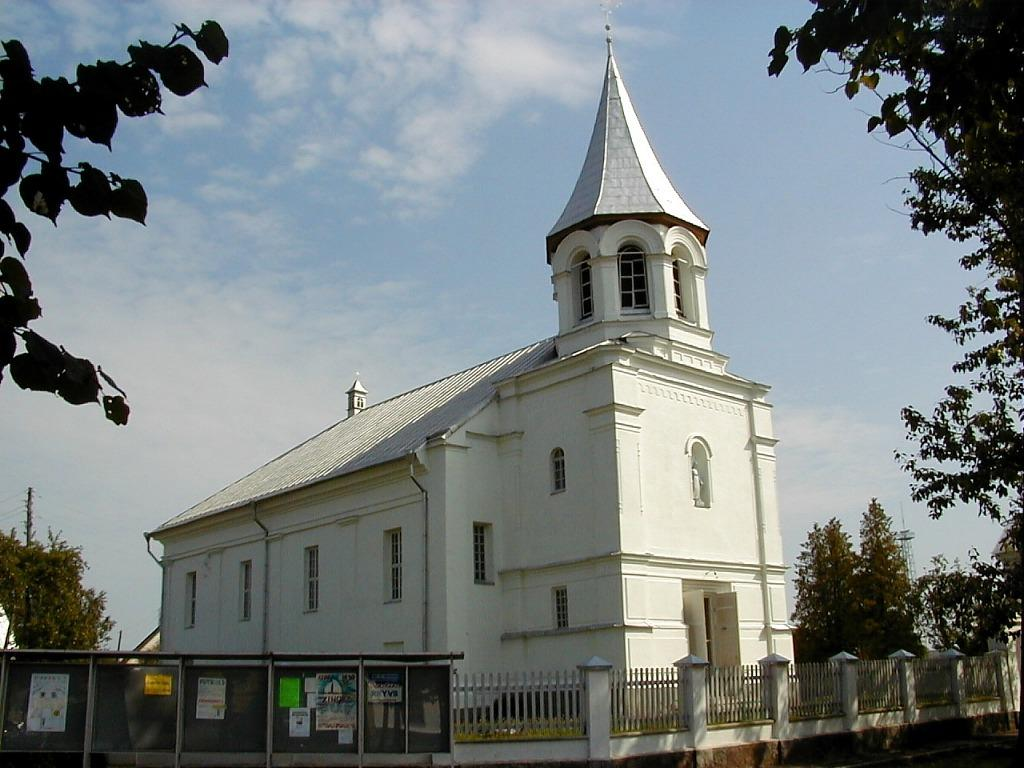
- Ilūkste Roman Catholic Church

- Coat of arms

- Location in Latvia
- Coordinates: 55°58′41″N 26°17′48″E
- Country: Latvia
- Municipality: Augšdaugava Municipality
- Town rights: 1917

Government
  - Mayor: Stefans Rāzna

Area
  - Total: 8.69 km^{2} (3.36 sq mi)
  - Land: 8.48 km^{2} (3.27 sq mi)
  - Water: 0.21 km^{2} (0.081 sq mi)
- Elevation: 100 m (330 ft)

Population (2026)
  - Total: 1,992
  - Density: 235/km^{2} (608/sq mi)
- Time zone: UTC+2 (EET)
  - Summer (DST): UTC+3 (EEST)
- Postal code: LV-5447
- Calling code: +371 654
- Number of city council members: 11
- Website: www.ilukste.lv

Ilūkste (Lithuanian: Alūksta, Ilūkšta; German: Illuxt) is a town in Augšdaugava Municipality in the Selonia region of Latvia. The population in 2020 was 2,216.

== History ==
The territory of modern Ilūkste was inhabited by the Selonians, an ancient Baltic tribe. As a settlement Ilūkste started to grow in the beginning of the 16th century when it was part of the Livonian Confederation and was administered by the Komtur of Daugavpils. Ilūkste was first mentioned in written sources in 1559 as a small village, part of the estate lands of Count Kasper Sieberg. After the secularization of the Livonian Order, Ilūkste became part of the Duchy of Courland and Semigallia. In 1567 a Lutheran church was built in Ilūkste. Many Russian Old Believers found refuge in Ilūkste during this period. During 17th century local landowner Bartholomew Zieberg offered refugee to Jesuits who were expelled from Swedish-controlled Riga. As a result, a wooden Catholic church was built in Ilūkste in 1690. In the 18th century Jesuits constructed a large Catholic church with two towers which at that time was one of the biggest in Latvia.

After the Duchy of Courland was incorporated in the Russian Empire in 1795, thanks to its strategic location at the crossroads of Lithuania, Belarus and Daugavpils, Ilūkste became an important trade city and regional center. In 1816 a Uniate church was built in Ilūkste. In the 19th century many Jewish merchants settled in Ilūkste and annual fairs were held. In 1840 a highway from St. Petersburg to Warsaw was constructed nearby which stimulated further development. In 1865 a new Lutheran church was built. In 1873 the Daugavpils-Tilsit railway line was constructed through the town. In 1910 a Russian teacher institute was opened in Ilūkste.

In World War I, Ilūkste was situated on the fighting front line, and by the war's end the city was totally destroyed. There were no intact houses left in Ilūkste and also all churches were damaged. Ilūkste was granted town rights in 1917 however it never fully regained its pre-war level of prosperity. In 1927 a new school building was constructed in town and Latvian poet, playwright and at that moment Minister of Education Rainis participated in the opening ceremony.

During the Soviet period, some industries shifted from Daugavpils to Ilūkste.

== Gallery ==
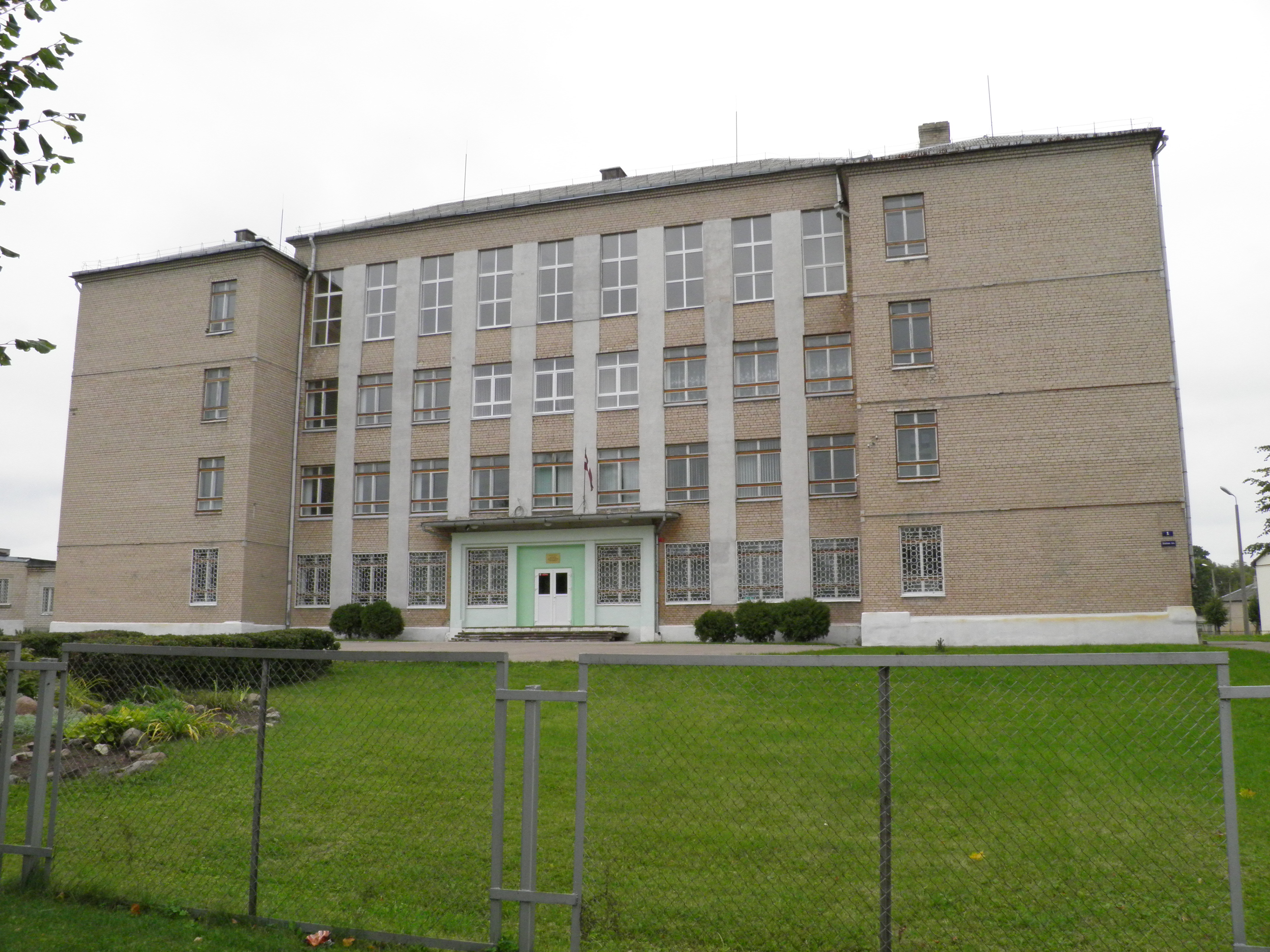
Secondary school in Ilūkste

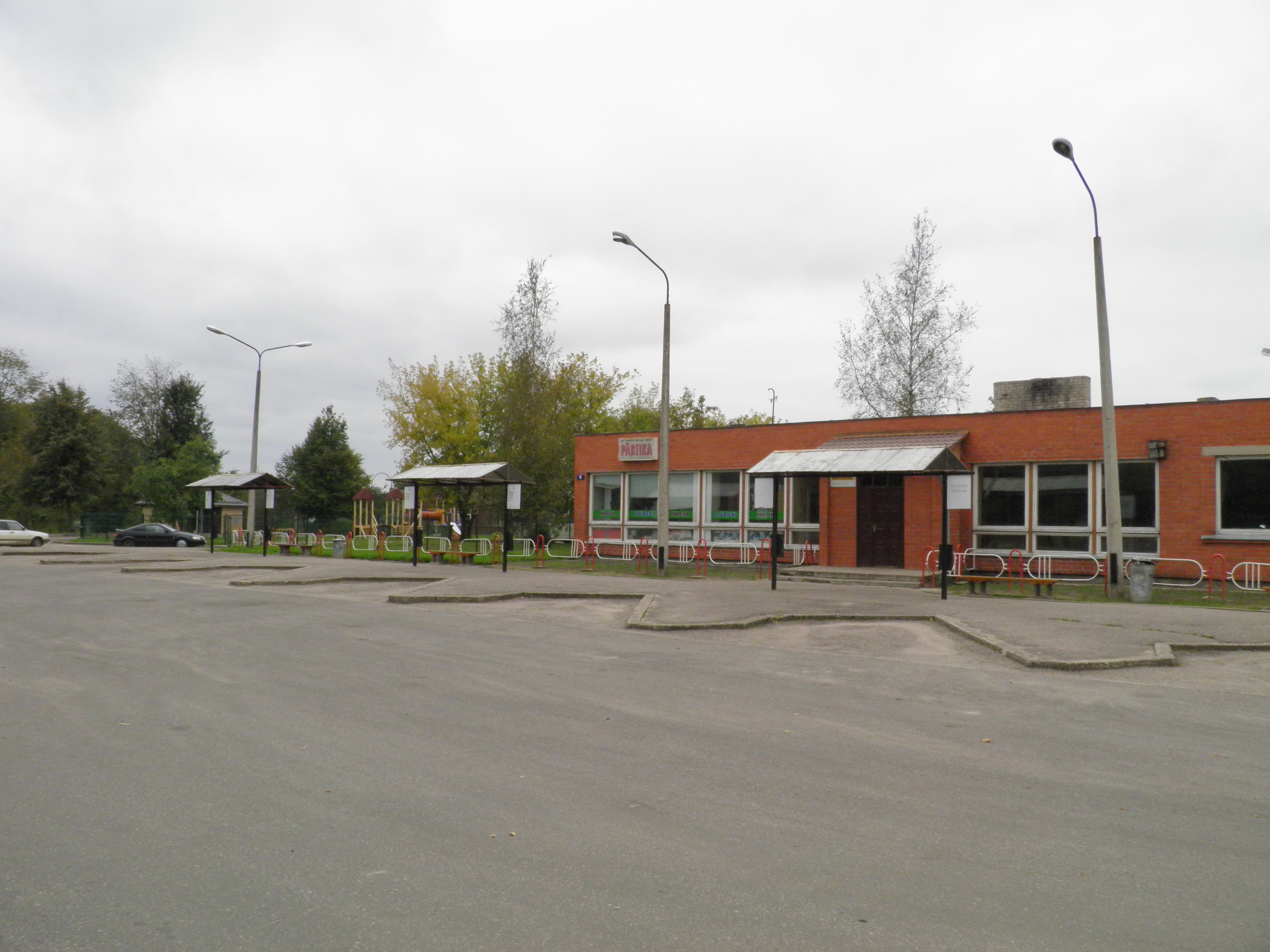
Bus station in Ilūkste

== See also ==
- List of cities in Latvia
- Augšdaugava Municipality#Notable people
