= Augšdaugavas NSS =

Latvian football club

- Full name: Augšdaugavas novada sporta skola (Augšdaugava Municipality Sports School)
- Founded: 1988; 38 years ago
- Ground: Ilūkstes pilsētas stadions, Ilūkste
- Capacity: 300
- Manager: Aleksandrs Vorotinskis
- League: Latvian First League
- 2025: 14th
- Website: Augšdaugavas NSS
Home colours	Away colours

Augšdaugavas NSS, previously Ilūkstes NSS, is a Latvian football club located in Ilūkste which plays in the Optibet Nākotnes Līga (1. līga). The club plays its home matches at the Ilūkste City Stadium with a capacity of 300 people.

== History ==
The club was founded in 1988 as Zemgale Ilūkste ('Semigallia' Ilūkste). It took part in the Latvian SSR Higher League, finishing 13th in its debut season. In 1989, just one year after foundation, the club's name was changed to Vārpa Ilūkste, and they finished the league in the 14th position. The 1990 season saw Vārpa Ilūkste (named after the Vārpa Sports Society, vārpa - 'grain ear') achieve its best result until then – the 10th position in the league table. In 1991 the club's name was changed to Vārpa Dilar, which was shortened to Dilar in 1992 . In 1991 they finished the league in the 7th position, but after the collapse of the Soviet Union earned a place in the newly formed Latvian Higher League for the 1992 season. With just 2 points in 22 matches the club finished the league in the last 12th position of the table and was relegated to the Latvian First League. In 1993 they were not enrolled as participants and the club's existence had practically ended.

In 1997, after 4 years of silence, the team was reformed as FK Ilūkste and took part in the Latvian First League, finishing in the 9th position. In 1998 the club's name was once again changed – this time to Ceļinieks ('Road Builder') – as the club managed to grab the 4th position of the league table at the end of the championship. The next season saw them get relegated from the Latvian First League, as they finished in the 7th position, receding to the Latvian Second League. The club played in the 3rd tier of Latvian football until 2006, when they won the championship and were once again promoted to the Latvian First League. Before the start of the 2007 Latvian First League season the club was renamed Ilūkste/BJSS to mark their partnership with the local Children and Youth Sports School (Bērnu un jaunatnes sporta skola). The club withdrew from the championship in mid-season due to financial difficulties, and they were once again relegated to the Latvian Second League. In 2009 and 2010 they won the Latvian Second League, but lost in the promotion play-offs, failing to earn a promotion. The promotion to the Latvian First League came in 2011, when Ilūkste/BJSS once again won the league and the play-offs as well.

In 2012 the club's name was changed to Ilūkstes NSS, as the club started its cooperation with the Ilūkste Municipality Sports School. They finished the Latvian First League championship in the 2nd position, being promoted to the Latvian Higher League for the second time in the club's history. In 2013 Ilūkstes NSS became members of the Latvian Higher League. They started the season playing their home matches in Daugavpils due to the reconstruction of the Ilūkstes pilsētas stadions. The stadium was opened in June 2013, and since then it has been the club's home ground. However, Ilūkstes NSS were relegated after ending up on the bottom of the table after one season, and in the next one weren't able to field a team for the Second League, so the team went down to the Second League. After Ilūkste Municipality was merged into Augšdaugava Municipality in 2021, the team adopted its current name.

Several Latvian football players, who started their professional careers in Ilūkste, have made it to the Latvian national team, including Aleksandrs Jeļisejevs, Andris Vaņins, Jurijs Žigajevs and Ritus Krjauklis.

== Honours ==
- Latvian Second League winners
  - 2011
- Latvian Second League runners-up
  - 2006, 2009, 2010
- Latvian First League runners-up
  - 2012

== Managers ==
Name	Period
(Latvia) Alens Vinokurovs	2009–2013
(Russia) Vladimir Pachko	2013

== League and Cup history ==
Season	Division	Position/Teams	Latvian Football Cup
1988	1st (A klase)	13/16	Part of the USSR
1989	1st (A klase)	14/17	Part of the USSR
1990	1st (A klase)	10/14	Part of the USSR
1991	1st (A klase)	7/20	Part of the USSR
1992	1st (Virslīga)	12/12	Was not held
1997	2nd (1. līga)	9/14	1/8 finals
1998	2nd (1. līga)	4/8	Did not participate
1999	2nd (1. līga)	7/8	Did not participate
2003	3rd (2. līga)	2/8^{*}	1/16 finals
2004	3rd (2. līga)	3/8	1/16 finals
2005	3rd (2. līga)	2/8^{*}	1/16 finals
2006	3rd (2. līga)	1/8^{*}	1st round
2007	2nd (1. līga)	16/16	2nd round
2009	3rd (2. līga)	1/8^{*}	Did not participate
2010	3rd (2. līga)	1/8^{*}	Did not participate
2011	3rd (2. līga)	1/8	Did not participate
2012	2nd (1. līga)	2/14	Did not participate
2013	1st (Virslīga)	10/10	1/8 finals
2015	3rd (2. līga)	5/8^{*}	Did not participate
2016	3rd (2. līga)	3/8^{*}	Did not participate
2017	3rd (2. līga)	6/8^{*}	Did not participate

Key:^{*} Results before promotion play-offs (Latgale's championship zone)

== Sponsors ==
Role	Sponsors
General sponsors	(Latvia) Ilūkstes novada dome
Kit manufacturer	(Italy) Erreà
