= FK Ventspils =

Association football club in Latvia

Ventspils
- Full name: Futbola klubs Ventspils
- Nickname: Yellow-Blues
- Founded: 1997; 29 years ago
- Dissolved: 2024; 2 years ago
- Ground: Ventspils Olimpiskais Stadions
- Capacity: 3,200
- Manager: Igor Kichigin
- League: Latvian First League
- Website: fkventspils.com
Home colours	Away colours

FK Ventspils was a Latvian professional football club based at Ventspils Olimpiskais Stadions in Ventspils. It was one of the most prominent football clubs in the country. The club played in the Latvian Virslīga since 1997.

It folded in July 2021 and was officially liquidated on 19 January 2024. A new phoenix club - JFK Ventspils was created on the basis of the former FK Ventspils youth academy, returned to Latvian football and competes in the Latvian First League as of 2023.

In total, FK Ventspils has won six league titles and seven Latvian Cups. They became Latvian Higher League champions in 2006, 2007, 2008, 2011, 2013 and 2014. In 2009 FK Ventspils became the first Latvian club to participate in the group stages of a UEFA competition after beating BATE Borisov from Belarus.

== History ==
FK Ventspils was founded in 1997 with the merger of two former Ventspils clubs – FK Venta and FK Nafta. Its predecessor, Venta, was one of the leading clubs in the Latvian league in the 1960s.

=== FK Venta ===
The next notable success for “Venta” was in 1967, when they won the Latvian Cup. By that time they had quite a fighting fit line-up, and 1969 already was their golden year when Venta became champions. During the tournament they gained 43 points; 20 matches won, 3 matches ended in a draw and only 3 matches lost. Additionally, they lost only in the away matches. They scored 45 goals and conceded 16. At that time Venta's leader was a player manager, who is well known not only to the admirers of Ventspils, but the whole of Latvian football, Vladimir Chikinov.

This was the golden line-up: Leonid Virko, Konstantin Zhurkevich, Aleksandr Busarov, Valery Yashenko, Aleksandr Tronev, Ariy Shmerling, Vladimir Samohvalov, Aleksandr Novash, Nikolay Chaevky, Nikolay Pozdnyakov, Vladimir Chikinov, Viktor Yurinov, Viktor Litvinenko, Aleksandr Rakicky, Valentin Ipolitov, Vladimir Kutuzov, Valentin Vetrenko, Genady Hrustalov.

There was a huge effort put into both the matches and training. However, at that time they had quite a modest material and technical basis. They trained in the sport hall of Ventspils port, had training camps in Piltene and went to Moldova several times. They had close contacts with a children's sport school from which talented youth players often came into the team. Whereas these days there are limits on foreign born players, at that time it was an obligation for the team to have two players younger than 18 years of age in the line-up. Thus, V. Kutuzov, V. Ivankovich, N. Dishlov and later Y. Romanenko, V. Fedotov and others appeared in the team.

In 1963, Ventspils gained a place and the rights to play in the Latvian championship (Virsliga). The next major achievement for "Venta" came in 1967, when it won the Latvian Cup. In 1969 "Venta" were champions of Latvia, in that season "Venta" got 43 points, 20 matches won, three drawn and three lost. In the 1970s the team lost its position, in the 1980s it lost its financial support and became defunct for some years. In 1994 Venta returned to 1. līga but after that season many players left the club as FK Nafta was formed. Until the merger Venta played in 1. liga.

=== FK Nafta ===
FK Nafta was formed in 1995. In the first season the club won its 2nd league division and earned a promotion to the 1st league. In its only season there the club finished higher than FK Venta. After the season the teams merged to form FK Ventspils.

=== FK Ventspils ===
The recent history of Ventspils began in 1997, the year of the team's foundation. In February 2007, the club that represents the town on the bank of the river Venta with a population of 45,000 people, celebrated its 10th anniversary. In a relatively short period of time FK Ventspils has become one of the strongest clubs in Latvia. FK Ventspils has rapidly developed and gained a reputation of a serious Latvian club, winning various trophies.

In 2003 FK Ventspils won the Latvian Cup for the first time in the club's history, and in the next two consecutive years. Only the main trophy – golden medal of the Latvian championship – had yet to be attained. The team won silver and bronze medals of the Latvian championship several times, and, finally, in 2006 FK Ventspils became the champions of Latvia.

The Ukrainian specialist Roman Hryhorchuk led FK Ventspils to the main trophy. Prior to that, in 2003, FK Ventspils had won the Latvian Cup for the first time. Also, in 2004 and in 2005, FK Ventspils won the trophy, but only finished second and third in the Latvian championship. Before Hryhorchuk the team was managed by Russian coach Boris Sinicin, English coach Paul Anthony Ashworth, Lithuanian specialist Saulius Širmelis and the Latvian local Sergejs Semjonovs.

In 1999 FK Ventspils had its debut in the Intertoto Cup and beat Norwegian team Vålerenga on aggregate. Later the club took part in the UEFA Cup, thus allowing fans to see matches against European clubs as Stuttgart, Rosenborg, Brøndby and Newcastle United. The 0–0 draw in the away match against Newcastle United might have been called the greatest achievement of FK Ventspils until 2009. However, even more memorable were the matches against Brøndby in 2004, when FK Ventspils eliminated the Danish club from the UEFA Cup.

On 17 July 2007 FK Ventspils made its debut in the UEFA Champions League. The yellow-and-blue started their historical trip of the most prestigious club tournament in Europe in Wales, where they played against TNS. The author of the first FK Ventspils goal in the Champions League was forward Vits Rimkus. One week later, on 25 July, FK Ventspils achieved their first victory in the Champions League, beating TNS 2–1 at home. Goals were scored by defenders Jean-Paul Ndeki and Deniss Kačanovs. In the second qualifying round the Roman Hryhorchuk's team played against Red Bull Salzburg, led by the legendary Italian specialist Giovanni Trapattoni and lost. In 2008 FK Ventspils participated in the Champions League for the second time. The first opponents of the team were again the champions of Wales, Llanelli.

=== UEFA Europa League Group stage 2009/10 ===
In the 2009–10 season FK Ventspils became the first Latvian club to participate in the group stages of UEFA club competitions after beating BATE Borisov from Belarus in the last UEFA Europa League qualification round. FK Ventspils opponents in the group stages were Sporting CP from Portugal, Hertha BSC from Germany and Heerenveen from the Netherlands. Adding several experienced players to the squad, FK Ventspils managed two 1–1 draws away in the Olympiastadion in Berlin and Estádio José Alvalade in Lisbon. They also kept a 0–0 draw against Heerenveen at home. They then lost 1-0 at home to Hertha Berlin and 5-0 away to Heerenween. With three points in six matches, FK Ventspils finished last in Group D, failing to qualify for the UEFA Europa League group stages.

In 2010 FK Ventspils won the 2009–10 Baltic League. They finished second in the national championship, qualifying for the UEFA Europa League first qualification stage. The club was knocked out of the tournament in the third qualification stage by Red Star Belgrade. In 2011, they won the national championship, securing their fourth league title. In 2013 FK Ventspils won the league for the fifth time and lifted the Latvian Cup for the sixth time in the club's history. In the middle of 2013 the club participated in the UEFA Europa League qualification stages, reaching the third qualification stage. They knocked out the Welsh champions Airbus UK Broughton and Luxembourg National Division club Jeunesse Esch, but lost to the Israeli club Maccabi Haifa.

=== Disqualification ===
On 9 June 2021, UEFA banned FK Ventspils from participating in UEFA club competitions for the next seven years (i.e. up to and including the 2027–28 season) for violating UEFA regulations related to "fraud, bribery and/or corruption" and for "violation of the integrity of matches and competitions". Club officials Nikolajs Djakins and Adlan Shishkanov were banned from football for 4 years and for life, respectively. The charges were related to July 2018 Europa League qualifier against Bordeaux, Russian referee Sergey Lapochkin who was refereeing that game was banned from football activity for 10 years.

=== Dissolution ===
By 2021, financial problems had beset the club and in the middle of the 2021 Virslīga season the club pulled out of the league and was dissolved.

== Team honours ==
- Virslīga: 6
  - 2006, 2007, 2008, 2011, 2013, 2014
- Latvian Cup: 7
  - 2003, 2004, 2005, 2007, 2010–11, 2012–13, 2016–17
- Baltic League: 1
  - 2009–10
- Livonia Cup: 1
  - 2008

== Individual honours ==
Year	Player/manager	Award
2005	(Latvia) Igors Sļesarčuks	Virslīga top scorer
2006	(Cameroon) Jean-Paul Ndeki	Virslīga best defender
2006	(Cameroon) Jean-Paul Ndeki	Virslīga best player
2006, 2007, 2008	(Latvia) Andris Vaņins	Virslīga best goalkeeper
2006, 2007, 2008	(Ukraine) Roman Hryhorchuk	Virslīga best manager
2007	(Latvia) Vīts Rimkus	Virslīga best player
2007	(Cameroon) Jean-Paul Ndeki	CIS Cup best player
2007, 2008	(Latvia) Vīts Rimkus	Virslīga top scorer
2007, 2008	(Latvia) Vīts Rimkus	Virslīga best forward
2008	(Latvia) Andris Vaņins	Virslīga best player
2008	(Latvia) Andris Vaņins	Latvian Footballer of the Year
2010	(Latvia) Jurijs Žigajevs	Virslīga best player
2010, 2013	(Latvia) Jurijs Žigajevs	Virslīga best midfielder
2011	(Latvia) Oļegs Laizāns	Virslīga best midfielder
2011	(Latvia) Oļegs Laizāns	Virslīga best player
2011	(Russia) Sergei Podpaly	Virslīga best manager
2013	(Latvia) Jurijs Žigajevs	Virslīga best player
2013, 2014	(Latvia) Jurģis Pučinskis	Virslīga best manager
2014	(Latvia) Kaspars Dubra	Virslīga best defender

== Participation in Latvian Championships ==
Year	Division	Position
1997	Virsliga	4th
1998	Virsliga	3rd
1999	Virsliga	3rd
2000	Virsliga	2nd
2001	Virsliga	2nd
2002	Virsliga	2nd
2003	Virsliga	3rd
2004	Virsliga	3rd
2005	Virsliga	3rd
2006	Virsliga	1st
2007	Virsliga	1st
2008	Virsliga	1st
2009	Virsliga	2nd
2010	Virsliga	2nd
2011	Virsliga	1st
2012	Virsliga	3rd
2013	Virsliga	1st
2014	Virsliga	1st
2015	Virsliga	3rd
2016	Virsliga	3rd
2017	Virsliga	4th
2018	Virsliga	2nd
2019	Virsliga	3rd

== Participation in Baltic League ==
Year	Position
2007–08	Runners-up
2008–09	Semi-finals
2009–10	Winners
2010–11	Runners-up

== European record ==
Season	Competition	Round	Club	Home	Away	Aggregate
1999	UEFA Intertoto Cup	1R	(Norway) Vålerenga	2–0	0–1	2–1
1999	UEFA Intertoto Cup	2R	(Turkey) Kocaelispor	1–1	0–2	1–3
2000–01	UEFA Cup	QR	(Hungary) Vasas	2–1	1–3 (aet)	3–4
2001–02	UEFA Cup	QR	(Finland) HJK Helsinki	0–1	1–2	1–3
2002–03	UEFA Cup	QR	(Switzerland) Lugano	3–0	0–1	3–1
2002–03	UEFA Cup	1R	(Germany) Stuttgart	1–4	1–4	2–8
2003–04	UEFA Cup	QR	(Poland) Wisła Płock	1–1	2–2	3–3 (a)
2003–04	UEFA Cup	1R	(Norway) Rosenborg	1–4	0–6	1–10
2004–05	UEFA Cup	1QR	(Faroe Islands) B68 Toftir	8–0	3–0	11–0
2004–05	UEFA Cup	2QR	(Denmark) Brøndby	0–0	1–1	1–1 (a)
2004–05	UEFA Cup	1R	(Poland) Amica Wronki	1–1	0–1	1–2
2005–06	UEFA Cup	1QR	(Northern Ireland) Linfield	1–2	1–0	2–2 (a)
2006–07	UEFA Cup	1QR	(Iceland) Knattspyrnufélagið Víkingur	2–1	2–0	4–1
2006–07	UEFA Cup	2QR	(England) Newcastle United	0–1	0–0	0–1
2007–08	UEFA Champions League	1QR	(Wales) The New Saints	2–1	2–3	4–4 (a)
2007–08	UEFA Champions League	2QR	(Austria) Red Bull Salzburg	0–3	0–4	0–7
2008–09	UEFA Champions League	1QR	(Wales) Llanelli	4–0	0–1	4–1
2008–09	UEFA Champions League	2QR	(Norway) Brann	2–1	0–1	2–2 (a)
2009–10	UEFA Champions League	2QR	(Luxembourg) F91 Dudelange	3–0	3–1	6–1
2009–10	UEFA Champions League	3QR	(Belarus) BATE Borisov	1–0	1–2	2–2 (a)
2009–10	UEFA Champions League	PO	(Switzerland) Zürich	0–3	1–2	1–5
2009–10	UEFA Europa League	Group D	(Germany) Hertha BSC	0–1	1–1	4th
2009–10	UEFA Europa League	Group D	(Netherlands) Heerenveen	0–0	0–5	4th
2009–10	UEFA Europa League	Group D	(Portugal) Sporting CP	1–2	1–1	4th
2010–11	UEFA Europa League	1QR	(North Macedonia) Teteks	0–0	1–3	1–3
2011–12	UEFA Europa League	2QR	(Belarus) Shakhtyor Soligorsk	3–2	1–0	4–2
2011–12	UEFA Europa League	3QR	(Serbia) Red Star Belgrade	1–2	0–7	1–9
2012–13	UEFA Champions League	2QR	(Norway) Molde	1–1	0–3	1–4
2013–14	UEFA Europa League	1QR	(Wales) Airbus UK Broughton	0–0	1–1	1–1 (a)
2013–14	UEFA Europa League	2QR	(Luxembourg) Jeunesse Esch	1–0	4–1	5–1
2013–14	UEFA Europa League	3QR	(Israel) Maccabi Haifa	0–0	0–3	0–3
2014–15	UEFA Champions League	2QR	(Sweden) Malmö FF	0–1	0–0	0–1
2015–16	UEFA Champions League	2QR	(Finland) HJK Helsinki	1–3	0–1	1–4
2016–17	UEFA Europa League	1QR	(Faroe Islands) Víkingur Gøta	2–0	2–0	4–0
2016–17	UEFA Europa League	2QR	(Scotland) Aberdeen	0–1	0–3	0–4
2017–18	UEFA Europa League	1QR	(Iceland) Valur	0–0	0–1	0–1
2018–19	UEFA Europa League	1QR	(Albania) Luftëtari	5−0	3–3	8–3
2018–19	UEFA Europa League	2QR	(France) Bordeaux	0–1	1–2	1–3
2019–20	UEFA Europa League	1QR	(Albania) Teuta	3–0	0–1	3–1
2019–20	UEFA Europa League	2QR	(Malta) Gżira United	4–0	2–2	6–2
2019–20	UEFA Europa League	3QR	(Portugal) Vitória de Guimarães	0–3	0–6	0–9
2020–21	UEFA Europa League	1QR	(Moldova) Dinamo-Auto	2–1	—N/a	—N/a
2020–21	UEFA Europa League	2QR	(Norway) Rosenborg	1–5	—N/a	—N/a

== Sponsors ==
General sponsors

(Latvia) Ventspils Pilsētas Dome
(Latvia) VK Tranzīts
(Latvia) LDZ Cargo
(Latvia) Ventspils Nafta

Kit manufacturer

(Germany) Adidas

Other sponsors

(Latvia) Ventamonjaks Serviss
(Latvia) Ventspils Brīvostas Pārvalde
(Latvia) Latus Sardze
(Latvia) Vats
(Latvia) Venden
(Latvia) Kurzemes Radio
(Latvia) Albert Hotel
(Latvia) Radio SWH
(Latvia) From Me

== Current squad ==
As to 30 July 2023

No.	Pos.	Nation	Player
—	GK	LVA	Ilja Isajevs
—	GK	LVA	Alekss Petrovs
—	GK	LVA	Krists Svarups
—	DF	LVA	Aleksandrs Baturinskis
—	DF	LVA	Mariss Bite
—	DF	LVA	Nikita Rozancevs
—	DF	LVA	Janis Jekabs Gaisins
—	DF	LVA	Markoss Feldmans
—	DF	LVA	Vladislavs Bojaruns
—	DF	LVA	Tomass Ziborkins
—	MF	LVA	Niks Jansons

No.	Pos.	Nation	Player
—	MF	LVA	Rainers Veidemainis
—	MF	LVA	Davis Kaneps
—	MF	LVA	Valters Valts Grislis
—	MF	LVA	Artemijs Mihails Lucins
—	FW	LVA	Vladimirs Mukins
—	FW	LVA	Kristaps Kancs
—	FW	LVA	Kirils Markovs
—	FW	LVA	Valters Liepajnieks
—	FW	LVA	Klavs Vilumovs
—	FW	LVA	Divs Rins
—	FW	LVA	Kaspars Svārups

== Notable former players ==
- Past (and present) players who are the subjects of Wikipedia articles can be found here.

== Managers ==
Name	Period
(Belarus) Sergei Borovsky	Jan 1, 1997 – Jan 1, 1998
(Lithuania) Saulius Cekanavičius (caretaker)	1998
(Russia) Boris Sinitsyn	1999–00
(Lithuania) Saulius Cekanavičius (caretaker)	2000
(England) Paul Ashworth	January 1, 2001 – June 30, 2003
(Lithuania) Saulius Širmelis	2003–04
(Latvia) Sergejs Semjonovs	2005
(Ukraine) Roman Hryhorchuk	July 1, 2005 – Aug 11, 2009
(Italy) Nunzio Zavettieri	Aug 11, 2009 – Dec 31, 2010
(Russia) Sergei Podpaly	Jan 17, 2011 – May 17, 2012
(Latvia) Jurģis Pučinskis	July 1, 2012–14th Sept, 2015
(England) Paul Ashworth	2015–2017
(Montenegro) Dejan Vukićević	2018–2019
(Latvia) Igors Kļosovs	2019
(Moldova) Viorel Frunză	2020–
(Moldova) Ghenadie Anghel	2004
