= 2000 Latvian Football Cup =

Football competition held in Latvia

The Latvian Football Cup 2000 was the 59th edition of the Latvian football knockout tournament.

Skonto Riga successfully pursued its title on 2000-05-27 in the final against FK Liepājas Metalurgs, 4–1, in Daugava Stadium.

== Preliminary round ==
Team 1	Score	Team 2
April 8, 2000
Ostas Policija Riga	w/o	SFK Varavīksne Riga

== First round ==
Team 1	Score	Team 2
April 12, 2000
Valmieras FK	2-0	Ostas Policija Riga
Skonto Riga	11-0	Fortūna Ogre
LU/Daugava Rīga	1-0	Ludza/Malnava
FK Rēzekne	0-2	Dinaburg Daugavpils
Policijas FK	2-1	FK Zibens/Zemessardze
Berģu Bulls Berģi	0-6	FK Liepājas Metalurgs
FK Viola Jelgava	1-5	FK Rīga
FK Cēsis	0-12	FK Ventspils

== Quarterfinals ==
2000-04-19

Skonto Riga	7-0	LU/Daugava Rīga
Suharevs 4' (o.g.); Rekhviashvili 21'; Rubins 24'; Zemļinskis 40' (pen.); Koļesņičenko 61'; Chaladze 72', 90'

2000-04-19

Dinaburg Daugavpils	2-1	Policijas FK
Dubrovin 33'; Stratil 45'		Ryzheuski 74'

2000-04-19

FK Liepājas Metalurgs	1-0	FK Rīga
Artūrs Zakreševskis 82'

2000-04-19

FK Ventspils	7-0	Valmieras FK
Bezborodov 12', 67', 89' (pen.); Bulders 19', 33'; Panfyorov 31'; Agafonov 70'

== Semifinals ==
=== First leg ===
2000-05-10

Dinaburg Daugavpils	1-4	Skonto Riga
Loginov 87'		Chaladze 21'; Rubins 33', 52'; Korgalidze 68'

2000-05-10

FK Liepājas Metalurgs	6-2	FK Ventspils
Zakreševskis 8', 10'; Vaineikis 36', 61'; Verpakovskis 43'; Dobrecovs 57'		Bulders 15'; Panfyorov 30'

=== Second leg ===
2000-05-18

Skonto Riga	4-0	Dinaburg Daugavpils
Samusiovas 14', 42'; Buda 63'; Blagonadeždins 88'

Skonto Riga won 8-1 on aggregate

2000-05-18

FK Liepājas Metalurgs	4-1	FK Ventspils
Karlsons 8'; Labanau 31', 36', 75'		Bezborodov 45' (pen.)

Liepājas Metalurgs won 10-3 on aggregate

== Final ==
2000-05-27

Skonto Riga	4–1	FK Liepājas Metalurgs
Rubins 8', 63'; Koļesņičenko 43'; Stradiņš 52' (o.g.)		Verpakovskis 83'

Daugava Stadium
Attendance: 3,000
Referee: Andrejs Sipailo (Daugavpils)

GK	(Latvia) Aleksandrs Koliņko
DF	(Latvia) Igors Stepanovs
DF	(Lithuania) Mantas Samusiovas
DF	(Latvia) Juris Laizāns
DF	(Latvia) Valentīns Lobaņovs
MF	(Lithuania) Orestas Buitkus	(substituted off) 76'
MF	(Latvia) Andrejs Rubins
MF	(Georgia (country)) Zurab Menteshashvili	(substituted off) 67'
MF	(Georgia (country)) Aleksandre Rekhviashvili
FW	(Latvia) Vladimirs Koļesņičenko	(substituted off) 75'
FW	(Georgia (country)) David Chaladze
Substitutes:
MF	(Georgia (country)) Levan Korgalidze	(substituted on) 67'
DF	(Latvia) Oļegs Blagonadeždins	(substituted on) 75'
DF	(Lithuania) Andrėjus Tereškinas	(substituted on) 76'
Manager:
(Latvia) Aleksandrs Starkovs

GK	(Belarus) Vladimir Malyshev
DF	(Latvia) Jānis Rinkus	(substituted off) 46'
DF	(Latvia) Artūrs Zakreševskis
DF	(Latvia) Deniss Ivanovs
DF	(Ukraine) Yaroslav Komziuk
DF	(Latvia) Aleksandrs Stradins
MF	(Lithuania) Rolandas Vaineikis
MF	(Belarus) Andrei Lobanov	(substituted off) 46'
MF	(Lithuania) Saulius Atmanavičius
MF	(Latvia) Genādijs Soloņicins	(substituted off) 52'
FW	(Latvia) Viktors Dobrecovs
Substitutes:
DF	(Latvia) Giedrius Žutautas	(substituted on) 46'
MF	(Latvia) Māris Verpakovskis	(substituted on) 46'
MF	(Latvia) Vladimirs Draguns	(substituted on) 52'
Manager:
(Russia) Anatoli Shelest

Match rules

- 90 minutes.
- 30 minutes of extra-time if necessary.
- Penalty shootout if scores still level.
