= 2000 Latvian Higher League =

Latvian football league season for the highest division

Latvian Higher League
- Season: 2000
- Champions: Skonto FC
- Relegated: LU-Daugava
- UEFA Champions League: Skonto FC
- UEFA Cup: FK Ventspils; Dinaburg FC
- UEFA Intertoto Cup: FK Liepajas Metalurgs
- Top goalscorer: (Latvia) Vladimirs Kolesnicenko (17 goals)

The 2000 season in the Latvian Higher League, named Virslīga, was the tenth domestic competition since the Baltic nation gained independence from the Soviet Union on 6 September 1991. Eight teams competed in this edition, with Skonto FC claiming the title.

== Final table ==
Pos	Team	Pld	W	D	L	GF	GA	GD	Pts	Qualification or relegation
1	Skonto (C)	28	24	3	1	86	10	+76	75	Qualification for Champions League first qualifying round
2	Ventspils	28	19	8	1	55	20	+35	65	Qualification for UEFA Cup qualifying round
3	Liepājas Metalurgs	28	16	7	5	51	25	+26	55	Qualification for Intertoto Cup first round
4	Dinaburg	28	10	5	13	32	32	0	35	Qualification for UEFA Cup qualifying round
5	Rīga	28	9	4	15	35	47	−12	31	
6	Valmiera	28	5	9	14	25	48	−23	24	
7	Policijas	28	4	4	20	13	62	−49	16	
8	LU-Daugava (R)	28	2	6	20	21	74	−53	12	Relegation to Latvian First League

(C) Champions; (R) Relegated

== Match table ==
First half of the season
Home \ Away	DIN	MET	DAU	POL	RĪG	SKO	VAL	VEN
Dinaburg		1–3	1–1	0–0	1–2	1–2	0–1	0–1
Liepājas Metalurgs	0–1		5–2	1–0	2–0	1–3	2–1	1–1
LU-Daugava	2–1	0–3		1–1	0–3	0–9	2–2	0–3
Policijas	0–2	0–2	0–0		1–4	0–5	1–0	0–1
Rīga	1–2	0–4	1–2	2–0		1–3	0–0	1–3
Skonto	3–0	0–0	4–0	2–0	4–0		4–0	2–2
Valmiera	1–0	0–3	5–2	1–0	0–0	0–3		0–2
Ventspils	2–0	0–0	4–0	5–3	2–1	0–1	3–0	

Legend: Blue = home team win; Yellow = draw; Red = away team win.

Second half of the season
Home \ Away	DIN	MET	DAU	POL	RĪG	SKO	VAL	VEN
Dinaburg		1–2	2–0	3–0	0–0	0–2	2–0	1–2
Liepājas Metalurgs	1–1		5–1	0–1	3–0	1–3	2–1	1–1
LU-Daugava	2–4	0–1		1–2	1–2	0–5	1–1	1–3
Policijas	0–3	2–3	1–0		0–2	0–8	0–0	0–1
Rīga	0–1	1–2	2–1	4–1		0–4	2–2	0–2
Skonto	2–0	1–0	2–1	7–0	2–0		2–0	0–0
Valmiera	1–3	1–1	0–0	3–0	1–5	1–2		0–3
Ventspils	1–1	2–2	2–0	1–0	3–1	2–1	3–3	

Legend: Blue = home team win; Yellow = draw; Red = away team win.

== Top scorers ==
Rank	Player	Club	Goals
1	Vladimirs Koļesņičenko (LAT)	Skonto FC	17
2	Vladislav Bezborodov (RUS)	FK Ventspils	15
3	Mihails Miholaps (LAT)	Skonto FC	12
4	Jurijs Molotkovs (LAT)	FK Rīga	11
4	Andrey Labanov (BLR)	FHK Liepājas Metalurgs	11

== Awards ==
Best	Name	Team
Goalkeeper	Aleksandrs Koliņko (LAT)	Skonto FC
Defender	Igors Stepanovs (LAT)	Skonto FC
Midfielder	Alexander Rekhviashvili (GEO)	Skonto FC
Forward	Vladimirs Koļesņičenko (LAT)	Skonto FC

== Skonto FC 2000 ==
Pos	Name	Birthdate	P	Goal	Booked	Sent off (straight red)
DF	(Latvia) Oļegs Blagonadeždins	16.05.1973	18	4	2	-
	(Russia) Yevgeniy Buda	18.03.1977	12	3	-	-
MF	(Lithuania) Orestas Buitkus	11.04.1975	24	5	1	-
FW	(Georgia (country)) David Chaladze	22.01.1976	19	10	3	-
GK	(Latvia) Pāvels Doroševs	09.10.1980	1	0	-	-
MF	(Latvia) Vladimirs Koļesņičenko	04.05.1980	28	17	1	-
GK	(Latvia) Aleksandrs Koliņko	18.06.1975	17	–6	-	-
MF	(Georgia (country)) Levan Korgalidze	21.02.1980	21	4	1	-
MF	(Latvia) Juris Laizāns	06.01.1979	26	6	1	-
MF	(Latvia) Valentīns Lobaņovs	23.10.1971	22	-	1	-
-	(Ukraine) Vladimir Mel'nyk	21.11.1979	9	1	-	-
MF	(Georgia (country)) Zurab Menteshashvili	30.01.1980	21	6	2	-
FW	(Latvia) Mihails Miholaps	24.08.1974	17	12	-	-
MF	(Latvia) Viktors Morozs	30.07.1980	8	1	-	-
MF	(Lithuania) Viktoras Olšanskis	14.03.1969	8	1	-	-
GK	(Latvia) Andrejs Piedels	17.09.1970	11	–4	-	-
MF	(Georgia (country)) Alexander Rekhviashvili	06.08.1974	21	3	2	1
MF	(Latvia) Andrejs Rubins	26.11.1978	23	7	-	-
	(Lithuania) Mants Samusevs	08.09.1978	21	2	3	-
DF	(Latvia) Igors Stepanovs	21.01.1976	18	2	4	-
DF	(Lithuania) Andrėjus Tereškinas	10.07.1970	13	-	1	-
	(Latvia) Renārs Vucāns	04.11.1976	14	-	-	-
DF	(Latvia) Mihails Zemļinskis	21.12.1969	15	2	1	-
Manager: (Latvia) Aleksandrs Starkovs
