= 1999 Latvian Higher League =

Latvian football league season for the highest division

Latvian Higher League
- Season: 1999
- Champions: Skonto FC
- Relegated: FK Rezekne
- UEFA Champions League: Skonto FC
- UEFA Cup: FK Liepajas Metalurgs; FK Ventspils
- UEFA Intertoto Cup: Dinaburg FC
- Top goalscorer: (Latvia) Viktors Dobrecovs (22 goals)

The 1999 season in the Latvian Higher League, named Virslīga, was the ninth domestic competition since the Baltic nation gained independence from the Soviet Union on 6 September 1991. Eight teams competed in this edition, with Skonto FC claiming the title.

== Final table ==
Pos	Team	Pld	W	D	L	GF	GA	GD	Pts	Qualification or relegation
1	Skonto (C)	28	23	0	5	88	15	+73	69	Qualification for Champions League first qualifying round
2	Liepājas Metalurgs	28	19	3	6	73	25	+48	60	Qualification for UEFA Cup qualifying round
3	Ventspils	28	18	2	8	62	26	+36	56	Qualification for UEFA Cup qualifying round
4	Dinaburg	28	13	5	10	37	32	+5	44	Qualification for Intertoto Cup first round
5	Valmiera	28	10	5	13	33	42	−9	35	
6	Rīga	28	10	4	14	35	42	−7	34	
7	Policijas	28	5	5	18	25	93	−68	20	
8	Rēzekne (R)	28	1	2	25	12	90	−78	5	Relegation to Latvian First League

(C) Champions; (R) Relegated

== Match table ==
First half of the season
Home \ Away	DIN	MET	POL	RĒZ	RĪG	SKO	VAL	VEN
Dinaburg		0–0	1–1	2–0	2–0	1–0	0–0	1–0
Liepājas Metalurgs	3–0		4–1	6–0	3–2	2–3	3–0	3–1
Policijas	0–4	0–5		5–1	2–1	0–9	0–1	0–4
Rēzekne	1–2	0–4	0–1		0–0	0–2	0–3	0–2
Rīga	0–0	1–5	0–0	2–0		1–3	3–1	0–1
Skonto	1–0	3–2	2–0	2–1	1–0		5–0	3–1
Valmiera	0–4	1–1	1–1	4–0	2–3	0–1		0–3
Ventspils	0–0	2–0	5–2	5–1	2–1	1–0	3–0	

Legend: Blue = home team win; Yellow = draw; Red = away team win.

Second half of the season
Home \ Away	DIN	MET	POL	RĒZ	RĪG	SKO	VAL	VEN
Dinaburg		0–1	2–1	6–1	0–1	1–5	1–3	0–2
Liepājas Metalurgs	6–1		7–0	5–1	1–2	1–0	2–0	2–1
Policijas	0–5	1–3		1–1	3–0	0–12	1–1	2–8
Rēzekne	0–1	0–1	2–0		1–3	0–5	1–3	0–1
Rīga	0–1	1–0	5–0	5–0		0–4	0–0	2–4
Skonto	4–0	3–0	5–0	8–0	1–2		3–0	0–2
Valmiera	1–0	0–2	2–3	4–0	3–0	0–1		2–1
Ventspils	1–2	1–1	2–0	7–1	2–0	0–2	0–1	

Legend: Blue = home team win; Yellow = draw; Red = away team win.

== Top scorers ==
Rank	Player	Club	Goals
1	Viktors Dobrecovs (LAT)	FHK Liepājas Metalurgs	22
2	Viktor Voronkov (RUS)	FK Ventspils	18
3	David Chaladze (GEO)	Skonto FC	16
4	Mihails Miholaps (LAT)	Skonto FC	14
5	Vladimirs Koļesņičenko (LAT)	Skonto FC	13

== Awards ==
Best	Name	Team
Goalkeeper	Aleksandrs Koliņko (LAT)	Skonto FC
Defender	Mihails Zemļinskis (LAT)	Skonto FC
Midfielder	Vitālijs Astafjevs (LAT)	Skonto FC
Forward	Viktors Dobrecovs (LAT)	FK Liepājas Metalurgs

== Skonto FC 1999 ==
Pos	Name	Birthdate	P	Goal	Booked	Sent off (straight red)
MF	(Latvia) Vitālijs Astafjevs	03.04.1971	18	9	2	-
MF	(Latvia) Vladimirs Babičevs	22.04.1968	11	1	-	-
	(Latvia) Romans Bezzubovs	15.05.1979	2	-	-	-
DF	(Latvia) Oļegs Blagonadeždins	16.05.1973	23	-	-	-
MF	(Latvia) Imants Bleidelis	16.08.1975	19	4	-	-
FW	(Georgia (country)) David Chaladze	22.01.1976	15	16	2	-
	(Georgia (country)) Armaz Dzeladze	28.06.1973	5	-	-	-
MF	(Latvia) Vladimirs Koļesņičenko	04.05.1980	25	13	1	-
GK	(Latvia) Aleksandrs Koliņko	18.06.1975	18	–12	-	-
MF	(Georgia (country)) Levan Korgalidze	21.02.1980	13	1	-	-
MF	(Latvia) Juris Laizāns	06.01.1979	27	3	1	-
-	(Ukraine) Vladimir Mel'nyk	21.11.1979	13	3	1	-
MF	(Georgia (country)) Zurab Menteshashvili	30.01.1980	17	1	-	-
FW	(Latvia) Mihails Miholaps	24.08.1974	20	14	1	-
MF	(Latvia) Viktors Morozs	30.07.1980	1	-	-	-
MF	(Lithuania) Viktoras Olšanskis	14.03.1969	20	-	1	-
GK	(Latvia) Andrejs Piedels	17.09.1970	10	–3	-	-
MF	(Georgia (country)) Alexander Rekhviashvili	06.08.1974	24	1	5	-
MF	(Latvia) Andrejs Rubins	26.11.1978	25	6	2	-
DF	(Georgia (country)) Levan Silagadze	04.08.1976	20	-	1	-
-	(Russia) Sergey Solovyov	03.04.1978	7	1	-	-
DF	(Latvia) Igors Stepanovs	21.01.1976	20	4	1	-
DF	(Lithuania) Andrėjus Tereškinas	10.07.1970	18	1	1	-
	(Belarus) Sergey Yermolenko	29.05.1972	2	-	-	-
DF	(Latvia) Mihails Zemļinskis	21.12.1969	16	7	3	1
Manager: (Latvia) Aleksandrs Starkovs
