= 2001 Latvian Higher League =

Latvian football league season for the highest division

Latvian Higher League
- Season: 2001
- Champions: Skonto FC
- Relegated: FK Zibens/Zemessardze
- UEFA Champions League: Skonto FC
- UEFA Cup: FK Ventspils; FK Liepajas Metalurgs
- UEFA Intertoto Cup: Dinaburg FC
- Top goalscorer: (Latvia) Mihails Miholaps (Russia) Aleksandr Katasonov (23 goals each one)

The 2001 season in the Latvian Higher League, named Virslīga, was the eleventh domestic competition since the Baltic nation gained independence from the Soviet Union on 6 September 1991. Eight teams competed in this edition, with Skonto FC claiming the title.

== Final table ==
Pos	Team	Pld	W	D	L	GF	GA	GD	Pts	Qualification or relegation
1	Skonto (C)	28	22	2	4	94	26	+68	68	Qualification for Champions League first qualifying round
2	Ventspils	28	22	1	5	69	21	+48	67	Qualification for UEFA Cup qualifying round
3	Liepājas Metalurgs	28	20	4	4	60	24	+36	64	Qualification for UEFA Cup qualifying round
4	Dinaburg	28	15	5	8	60	29	+31	50	Qualification for Intertoto Cup first round
5	PFK Daugava	28	12	2	14	37	38	−1	38	
6	Valmiera	28	5	4	19	28	56	−28	19	
7	Rīga	28	3	5	20	25	72	−47	14	
8	Zibens/Zemessardze (R)	28	1	1	26	11	118	−107	4	Relegation to Latvian First League

(C) Champions; (R) Relegated

== Match table ==
First half of the season
Home \ Away	DIN	MET	PFK	RĪG	SKO	VAL	VEN	ZIB
Dinaburg		3–3	3–0	2–0	0–1	4–0	1–4	11–1
Liepājas Metalurgs	1–0		2–0	2–1	4–2	2–1	2–1	2–0
PFK Daugava	0–1	1–4		4–0	0–5	1–1	2–0	6–0
Rīga	2–3	1–4	1–1		1–6	3–2	0–1	2–0
Skonto	1–0	1–1	0–2	1–0		3–1	3–2	5–0
Valmiera	1–1	0–1	1–2	3–0	1–2		1–2	4–1
Ventspils	2–2	2–1	1–0	6–1	2–0	2–0		9–0
Zibens/Zemessardze	0–1	0–4	0–4	1–5	0–11	0–1	1–4	

Legend: Blue = home team win; Yellow = draw; Red = away team win.

Second half of the season
Home \ Away	DIN	MET	PFK	RĪG	SKO	VAL	VEN	ZIB
Dinaburg		0–0	2–0	1–1	0–2	6–1	1–0	4–1
Liepājas Metalurgs	2–1		2–0	1–0	1–2	3–0	1–2	4–0
PFK Daugava	1–3	1–2		3–1	0–2	3–0	0–2	2–0
Rīga	1–2	1–3	0–2		0–5	1–1	0–2	0–0
Skonto	2–0	2–2	3–0	9–1		3–1	2–0	7–2
Valmiera	0–3	0–2	0–1	1–1	2–3		0–4	2–0
Ventspils	2–0	2–0	2–0	3–0	3–2	2–0		3–1
Zibens/Zemessardze	0–5	0–4	0–1	3–1	0–9	0–3	0–4	

Legend: Blue = home team win; Yellow = draw; Red = away team win.

== Top scorers ==
Rank	Player	Club	Goals
1	Mihails Miholaps (LAT)	Skonto FC	23
2	Aleksandr Katasonov (RUS)	FK Liepājas Metalurgs	23
3	David Chaladze (GEO)	Skonto FC	21
4	Stanislav Dubrovin (RUS)	Dinaburg FC	20
5	Yevgeniy Landyrev (RUS)	FK Ventspils	18

== Awards ==
Best	Name	Team
Goalkeeper	Vadims Fjodorovs (LAT)	Dinaburg FC
Defender	Mihails Zemļinskis (LAT)	Skonto FC
Midfielder	Igors V. Stepanovs (LAT)	FK Ventspils
Forward	David Chaladze (GEO)	Skonto FC

== Skonto FC 2001 ==
Pos	Name	Birthdate	P	Goal	Booked	Sent off (straight red)
DF	(Latvia) Oļegs Blagonadeždins	16.05.1973	21	1	-	-
	(Latvia) Artūrs Bogdanovs	08.09.1981	1	-	-	-
MF	(Lithuania) Orestas Buitkus	11.04.1975	22	4	-	-
FW	(Georgia (country)) David Chaladze	22.01.1976	23	21	1	-
	(Ukraine) Andriy Chernov	21.10.1976	7	1	-	-
	(Lithuania) Igns Dedura	01.06.1978	16	1	1	-
GK	(Latvia) Pāvels Doroševs	09.10.1980	1	0	-	-
	(Latvia) Vadims Gospodars	25.12.1983	1	-	-	-
FW	(Latvia) Aleksandrs Jelisejevs	11.08.1971	15	4	-	-
MF	(Latvia) Vladimirs Koļesņičenko	04.05.1980	28	8	1	-
MF	(Georgia (country)) Levan Korgalidze	21.02.1980	23	5	-	-
FW	(Lithuania) Audrius Kšanavičius	28.01.1977	2	-	-	-
MF	(Georgia (country)) Givi Kvaratskhelia	11.05.1979	10	1	1	-
MF	(Latvia) Valentīns Lobaņovs	23.10.1971	22	-	3	-
-	(Ukraine) Vladimir Mel'nyk	21.11.1979	1	-	-	-
MF	(Georgia (country)) Zurab Menteshashvili	30.01.1980	21	2	-	-
FW	(Latvia) Mihails Miholaps	24.08.1974	27	23	1	-
MF	(Latvia) Viktors Morozs	30.07.1980	16	-	1	-
MF	(Lithuania) Viktoras Olšanskis	14.03.1969	6	-	1	-
GK	(Latvia) Andrejs Pavlovs	22.02.1979	7	–5	-	-
GK	(Latvia) Andrejs Piedels	17.09.1970	21	–21	-	1
MF	(Georgia (country)) Alexander Rekhviashvili	06.08.1974	15	1	2	-
	(Lithuania) Mants Samusevs	08.09.1978	9	2	1	-
DF	(Lithuania) Andrėjus Tereškinas	10.07.1970	10	-	-	-
FW	(Latvia) Māris Verpakovskis	15.10.1979	22	10	1	1
MF	(Latvia) Aleksejs Višņakovs	03.02.1984	2	-	-	-
DF	(Latvia) Artūrs Zakreševskis	07.08.1971	20	-	3	1
DF	(Latvia) Mihails Zemļinskis	21.12.1969	21	3	5	-
Manager: (Latvia) Aleksandrs Starkovs
