= Andrejs Pavlovs =

Latvian footballer

Personal information
- Date of birth: 22 February 1979 (age 47)
- Place of birth: Riga, Latvian SSR, USSR (now Republic of Latvia)
- Height: 1.98 m (6 ft 6 in)
- Position: Goalkeeper

Senior career*
Years	Team	Apps	(Gls)
2000	Policija Rīga	28	(0)
2001–2004	Skonto Rīga	25	(0)
2005–2007	FK Rīga	50	(0)
2008–2009	Ventspils	6	(0)
2009	→ Shakhtyor Soligorsk (loan)	4	(0)
2009–2010	Akritas Chlorakas	23	(0)
2010–2011	AEP Paphos	26	(0)
2011	Olympiakos Nicosia	9	(0)
2012	Lokomotiv Plovdiv	0	(0)
2012–2013	Spartaks Jūrmala	27	(0)
2014–2015	Skonto Rīga	51	(0)
2016–2017	Ventspils	23	(0)
2018	Spartaks Jūrmala	1	(0)

International career
2002–2004	Latvia	2	(0)
- * Club domestic league appearances and goals

Andrejs Pavlovs (born 22 February 1979) is a Latvian former professional footballer who played as a goalkeeper.

== Club career ==
Pavlovs started his professional career at Policija Rīga. In 2001, he joined Skonto Rīga, but was mostly back-up for Andrejs Piedels during his four years at club.

In 2005 Pavlovs signed a contract at FK Rīga. In Pavlovs's first season for FK Riga he played 22 out of the 28 league games.

On 23 July 2008, Pavlovs joined Bulgarian A PFG side Levski Sofia on trial during their summer training camp in Austria. In December 2008 he was on trial at Kilmarnock.

During the 2008–09 season Pavlovs was loaned to Shakhtyor Soligorsk in Belarus. After the loan return, he played for FK Ventspils. During the summer transfer window FK Ventspils signed two new goalkeepers - Pavel Chasnowski and Aleksandrs Koliņko - Pavlovs being left as the third choice keeper. Due to lack of playing time he left the team in October 2009, signing with the Cypriot club Akritas Chlorakas.

After a successful season in the Cypriot Second Division with Akritas he was signed by AEP Paphos in June 2010 to play in the Cypriot First Division. Pavlovs was a first eleven player for both - Akritas and AEP Paphos.

AEP Paphos were relegated from the top tier after the 2010–11 season and Pavlovs signed for Olympiakos Nicosia staying in the first division. He made his debut for the club on 28 August 2011, keeping a clean sheet in the 0–0 draw against Anagennisi Dherynia. Pavlovs made 9 league appearances, then fell out of favour and was released in January 2012 by mutual consent.

On 28 January 2012, Pavlovs joined the Bulgarian A PFG side Lokomotiv Plovdiv on a one-and-a-half-year contract. However, he did not make a single league appearance, mostly serving as the back-up keeper.

In May 2012 Pavlovs joined the Latvian Higher League club Spartaks Jūrmala. Serving as the first choice keeper, he made 27 league appearances during two seasons with the club. Pavlovs was released in July 2013 with his contract being broken due to austerity policy at the club. He rejoined the club later in October 2013, when the financial situation had been stabilized.

In March 2014 Pavlovs joined Skonto Rīga, the club he had already been playing for from 2001 to 2005.

== International career ==
Pavlovs holds two international caps for Latvia. He was the third choice keeper in the UEFA Euro 2004 squad, as understudy to Aleksandrs Koliņko, making no appearances in the tournament. He was re-called to the national team yet again in 2012, being an unused substitute in the friendly match against Poland on 22 May.

== Honours ==
Skonto

- Latvian Higher League: 2001, 2002, 2003, 2004
- Latvian Cup: 2001, 2002

Ventspils

- Latvian Higher League: 2008
