= 2002 Latvian Higher League =

Latvian football league season for the highest division

Latvian Higher League
- Season: 2002
- Champions: Skonto FC
- UEFA Champions League: Skonto FC
- UEFA Cup: FK Ventspils; FK Liepajas Metalurgs
- UEFA Intertoto Cup: Dinaburg FC
- Top goalscorer: (Latvia) Mihails Miholaps (23 goals)

The 2002 season in the Latvian Higher League, named Virslīga, was the twelfth domestic competition since the Baltic nation gained independence from the Soviet Union on 6 September 1991. Eight teams competed in this edition, with Skonto FC claiming the title.

== Final table ==
Pos	Team	Pld	W	D	L	GF	GA	GD	Pts	Qualification or relegation
1	Skonto (C)	28	23	4	1	95	19	+76	73	Qualification for Champions League first qualifying round
2	Ventspils	28	22	5	1	77	20	+57	71	Qualification for UEFA Cup qualifying round
3	Liepājas Metalurgs	28	15	6	7	56	31	+25	51	Qualification for UEFA Cup qualifying round
4	Dinaburg	28	12	4	12	37	35	+2	40	Qualification for Intertoto Cup first round
5	Valmiera	28	6	6	16	26	54	−28	24	
6	PFK Daugava (R)	28	6	5	17	29	60	−31	23	Dissolved after the season
7	Rīga	28	6	2	20	24	75	−51	20	
8	Auda	28	5	2	21	23	73	−50	17	

Source: RSSSF
(C) Champions; (R) Relegated

== Match table ==
First half of the season
Home \ Away	AUD	DIN	MET	PFK	RĪG	VAL	SKO	VEN
Auda		2–1	0–4	3–0	0–1	1–1	1–3	1–3
Dinaburg	1–0		0–1	1–0	2–0	2–0	1–1	1–2
Liepājas Metalurgs	1–0	0–1		1–0	4–2	3–0	2–2	0–4
PFK Daugava	0–0	2–3	0–4		0–1	2–0	0–5	1–2
Rīga	0–2	0–5	0–3	0–1		1–1	0–3	0–4
Valmiera	2–0	1–2	2–2	0–0	4–1		0–4	0–1
Skonto	6–0	2–1	3–0	5–1	2–0	3–0		2–0
Ventspils	3–1	2–0	1–0	2–0	6–1	3–1	3–2	

Source: RSSSF
Legend: Blue = home team win; Yellow = draw; Red = away team win.

Second half of the season
Home \ Away	AUD	DIN	MET	PFK	RĪG	VAL	SKO	VEN
Auda		1–0	0–4	1–3	1–2	3–1	0–3	0–3
Dinaburg	4–2		3–1	2–0	0–1	0–0	0–4	1–1
Liepājas Metalurgs	6–0	3–1		4–4	5–1	0–0	0–1	1–1
PFK Daugava	3–1	1–1	1–2		6–1	2–1	0–6	0–2
Rīga	4–0	1–2	0–2	0–0		1–2	1–6	0–4
Valmiera	3–1	1–0	0–1	3–2	0–3		2–6	1–3
Skonto	7–2	3–1	3–1	4–0	2–0	4–0		1–1
Ventspils	4–0	3–1	1–1	5–0	8–2	3–0	2–2	

Source: RSSSF
Legend: Blue = home team win; Yellow = draw; Red = away team win.

== Top scorers ==
Rank	Player	Club	Goals
1	Mihails Miholaps (LAT)	Skonto FC	23
2	Aleksandr Katasonov (RUS)	FK Liepājas Metalurgs	18
3	Vīts Rimkus (LAT)	FK Ventspils	17
4	Jurijs Molotkovs (LAT)	Dinaburg FC	16
5	Yevgeniy Landyrev (RUS)	FK Ventspils	15
6	Andrejs Butriks (LAT)	FK Ventspils	14
6	Kristaps Grebis (LAT)	FK Liepājas Metalurgs	14
8	Viktors Dobrecovs (LAT)	FK Liepājas Metalurgs	12
9	Vladimirs Koļesņičenko (LAT)	Skonto FC	11

Source: RSSSF

== Awards ==
Best	Name	Team
Goalkeeper	Andrejs Piedels (LAT)	Skonto FC
Defender	Mihails Zemļinskis (LAT)	Skonto FC
Midfielder	Orestas Buitkus (LTU)	Skonto FC
Forward	Māris Verpakovskis (LAT)	Skonto FC
