= Pāvels Doroševs =

Latvian footballer (born 1980)

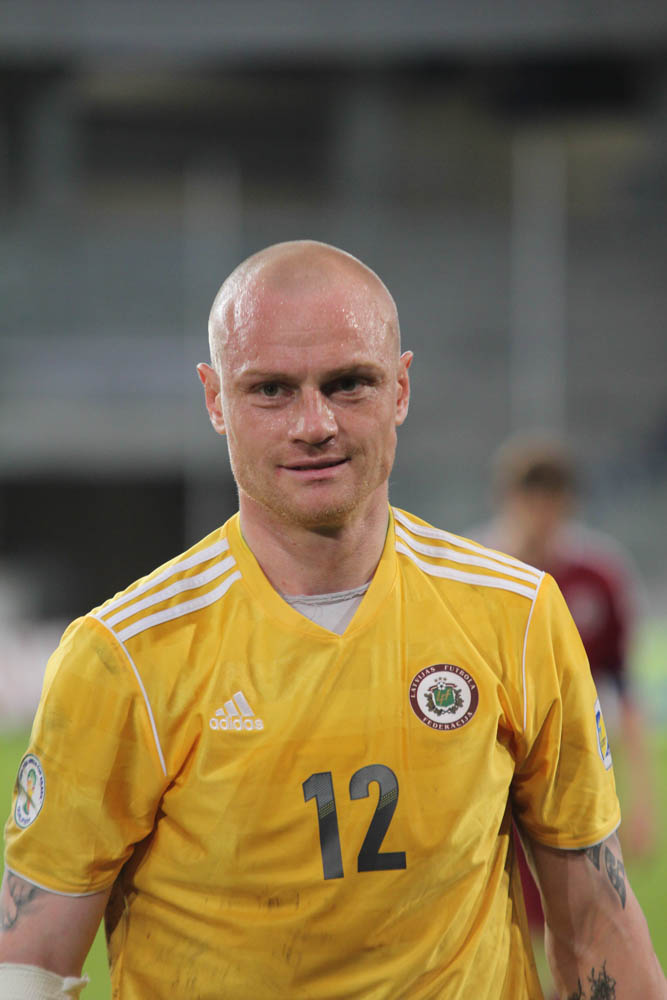
- Doroševs playing for Latvia

Personal information
- Full name: Pāvels Doroševs
- Date of birth: 9 October 1980 (age 46)
- Place of birth: Riga, Latvian SSR, Soviet Union (now Republic of Latvia)
- Height: 1.91 m (6 ft 3 in)
- Position: Goalkeeper

Team information
- Current team: SV Victoria Seelow
- Number: 1

Youth career
- JFC Skonto

Senior career*
Years	Team	Apps	(Gls)
2000–2001	Skonto Rīga	2	(0)
2001–2002	PFK Daugava	27	(0)
2003	Dinaburg Daugavpils	13	(0)
2004	FK Jūrmala	17	(0)
2004	FK Rīga	7	(0)
2005–2008	Skonto Rīga	50	(0)
2009–2012	Gabala	90	(0)
2012–2013	Liepājas Metalurgs	32	(0)
2013–2015	Neftchi Baku	5	(0)
2015–2017	Liepāja	41	(0)
2017–2018	Olimpia Kowary	15	(0)
2018	Atlantas	14	(0)
2018–	Victoria Seelow	49	(0)

International career
2012–2014	Latvia	3	(0)
- * Club domestic league appearances and goals as of 9 October 2024

Pāvels Doroševs (born 9 October 1980) is a Latvian footballer who plays as a goalkeeper for SV Victoria Seelow in the German Landesliga. He is also a former member of Latvia national football team.

== Career ==
=== Club ===
As a youth player Doroševs was a member of Skonto Riga youth system. He was taken to the first team in 2000, but due to the fact that the team's first keeper was that time Latvia international Andrejs Piedels, Doroševs was unable to compete for a place in the starting line-up. During 2 seasons he made only 2 league appearances. In 2001 Doroševs transferred to another local club PFK Daugava, where he could finally feel the taste of game action. During 2 seasons Doroševs appeared in 27 matches, showing solid qualities for a youngster. In 2003 Doroševs was heading to Daugavpils, as he was signed by Dinaburg. His stay there was not long – 13 matches, just one season and another transfer to FK Jūrmala in 2004. 17 games were played by Doroševs that season, leading him on to another transfer that year, when he was signed by FK Rīga. It seemed that the player just wouldn't settle down, as he was thrown from club to club, as the seasons went by – after just 7 games he moved to his previous club Skonto Riga, finally finding a place to settle down. The number of appearances made grew every season, as Doroševs spent 4 full seasons with the club, playing 50 matches. Even though he had to compete for a place in the starting line-up with Andrejs Piedels once again. In 2009 an offer from the Azerbaijan Premier League appeared and Doroševs moved to Gabala. Soon after joining Doroševs claimed the first keeper's place, not only becoming the captain of the team, but also setting a new Latvian record without conceding a single goal for 952 minutes, which gave him the 67th place in the world rankings out of 450 goalkeepers. During 4 seasons Doroševs played 90 matches. In 2012, he was released. In July 2012 Pāvels returned to the Latvian Higher League, signing a contract with FK Liepājas Metalurgs. He spent 2 seasons there, making 32 league appearances, 12 of them were clean sheets. In June 2013 Doroševs returned to Azerbaijan, signing a one-year contract with Azerbaijan Premier League champions Neftchi Baku. Doroševs made his Neftchi Baku debut as a first-half substitute for Ernest Nfor, as he was sacrificed after Saša Stamenković had been sent off in their game against Baku on 10 November 2013.

=== International ===
Doroševs made his international debut against Poland on 22 May 2012 in a game, which Latvia lost 1–0. He played all 90 minutes. Currently he is the back-up keeper for Andris Vaņins. Doroševs yet again appeared in the goal for Latvia in June 2013, playing full matches in friendlies against Qatar and Turkey.

== Career statistics ==
As of match played 31 October 2015

Club statistics
Season	Club	League	League		Cup		Other		Total	
Season	Club	League	App	Goals	App	Goals	App	Goals	App	Goals
2000	Skonto Rīga	Virsliga	1	0			0	0	1	0
2001	Skonto Rīga	Virsliga	1	0			0	0	1	0
2001	PFK Daugava	Virsliga	15	0			-		15	0
2002	PFK Daugava	Virsliga	12	0			-		12	0
2003	Dinaburg Daugavpils	Virsliga	13	0					13	0
2004	FK Jūrmala	Virsliga	17	0			-		17	0
2004	FK Rīga	Virsliga	7	0			-		7	0
2005	Skonto Rīga	Virsliga	9	0			0	0	9	0
2006	Skonto Rīga	Virsliga	7	0			0	0	7	0
2007	Skonto Rīga	Virsliga	15	0			0	0	15	0
2008	Skonto Rīga	Virsliga	19	0			-		19	0
2008–09	Gabala	Azerbaijan Premier League	9	0	4	0	-		9	0
2009–10	Gabala	Azerbaijan Premier League	29	0	4	0	-		29	0
2010–11	Gabala	Azerbaijan Premier League	27	0	3	0	-		30	0
2011–12	Gabala	Azerbaijan Premier League	25	0	2	0	-		27	0
2012	Liepājas Metalurgs	Virsliga	21	0	1	0	2	0	24	0
2013	Liepājas Metalurgs	Virsliga	11	0	3	0	0	0	14	0
2013–14	Neftchi Baku	Azerbaijan Premier League	4	0	4	0	0	0	8	0
2014–15	Neftchi Baku	Azerbaijan Premier League	1	0	0	0	0	0	1	0
2015	Liepāja	Virsliga	8	0	0	0	0	0	8	0
Total	Latvia		156	0	4	0	2	0	162	0
Total	Azerbaijan		95	0	13	0	0	0	108	0
Total			251	0	17	0	2	0	270	0

=== International ===
Appearances and goals by national team and year
Latvia
Year	Apps	Goals
2012	1	0
2013	2	0
Total	3	0

== Honours ==
Skonto

- Latvian Higher League: 2000, 2001
- Latvian Cup: 2000, 2001

Neftçı

- Azerbaijan Cup: 2013–14

Liepāja

- Latvian Higher League: 2015

Latvia

- Baltic Cup: 2012
