= Deniss Ivanovs =

Latvian footballer

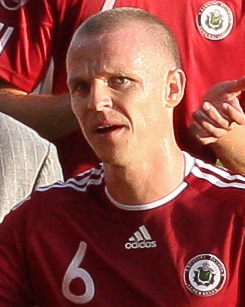
- Ivanovs playing for Latvia

Personal information
- Date of birth: 11 January 1984 (age 42)
- Place of birth: Liepāja, then part of Latvian SSR, Soviet Union
- Height: 1.86 m (6 ft 1 in)
- Position: Defender

Youth career
- Liepājas Metalurgs

Senior career*
Years	Team	Apps	(Gls)
2001–2009	Liepājas Metalurgs	187	(9)
2009–2010	Ajax Cape Town	21	(0)
2010–2011	Sivasspor	16	(0)
2011–2013	Baku	49	(3)
2014	Botoșani	8	(0)
2014	Liepāja	11	(0)
2015	Nyíregyháza Spartacus	9	(0)
2015–2020	Liepāja	90	(1)
Total		391	(13)

International career
2003–2005	Latvia U-21		
2005–2013	Latvia	60	(2)
- * Club domestic league appearances and goals

Deniss Ivanovs (born 11 January 1984) is a Latvian former footballer who played as a defender.

== Club career ==
Born in Liepāja, Ivanovs played in the youth team of local club Liepājas Metalurgs. Making his senior team debut in 2001, he played 9 seasons for Metalurgs, appearing in 187 league matches, scoring 9 goals, and eventually serving as captain.

In July 2009 Ivanovs went on trial with Dutch Eredivisie club, Ajax Amsterdam. He did not make the team but a month later, on 26 August 2009, he signed a three-year contract with their farm-club Ajax Cape Town of the South African Premier Soccer League. He played there for one season, making 21 appearances.

In July 2010 Ivanovs moved to Turkey, signing a two-year contract with the Süper Lig club Sivasspor. His debut came in a league match against Galatasaray which Sivasspor won 2–1. Ivanovs played all 90 minutes and received a yellow card. He appeared in 16 league matches but lost his place in the starting eleven in mid-season due to an injury. With his playing time limited, Ivanovs left Sivasspor at the end of the season.

In July 2011 Ivanovs joined the Azerbaijan Premier League club, FK Baku, with his national team teammate Māris Verpakovskis and manager Aleksandrs Starkovs. He played there for two seasons, winning the Azerbaijan Cup in 2012. Ivanovs was released by Baku at the end of the 2012–13 season.

In February 2014 Ivanovs joined the Romanian Liga I side FC Botoșani, appearing on 8 matches before leaving in mid-summer. In August 2014, after a five-year absence, Ivanovs returned to the Latvian Higher League, joining newly established FK Liepāja. After a brief spell in the winter of 2015 with Nyíregyháza Spartacus in the Nemzeti Bajnokság I, he went back to FK Liepāja where he was the captain of the team for the 2020 Latvian Higher League season. Ivanovs is individually sponsored by the company NPK Expert.

Ivanovs retired in November 2020, playing his last game for FK Liepāja.

== International career ==
Ivanovs made his debut for Latvia at the age of 21, on 24 December 2005, in a King's Cup match against Thailand. He became a first eleven player in 2007. Ivanovs scored his first international goal on 26 March 2008 in a friendly match against Andorra. On 19 June 2010, for a Baltic Cup match against Estonia, Ivanovs was named captain of the team. As of 2015, he has collected 60 international caps and scored 2 goals.

== Career statistics ==
As of 18 January 2015

Club performance			League		Cup		Continental		Total	
Season	Club	League	Apps	Goals	Apps	Goals	Apps	Goals	Apps	Goals
2001	Liepājas Metalurgs	Latvian Higher League	1	0			-		1	0
2002	Liepājas Metalurgs	Latvian Higher League	26	0			2	1	28	1
2003	Liepājas Metalurgs	Latvian Higher League	24	0			0	0	24	0
2004	Liepājas Metalurgs	Latvian Higher League	19	0			3	0	22	0
2005	Liepājas Metalurgs	Latvian Higher League	28	0			4	0	32	0
2006	Liepājas Metalurgs	Latvian Higher League	23	2			2	1	25	3
2007	Liepājas Metalurgs	Latvian Higher League	27	2			4	2	31	4
2008	Liepājas Metalurgs	Latvian Higher League	20	4			0	0	20	4
2009	Liepājas Metalurgs	Latvian Higher League	19	1			2	0	21	1
2009–10	Ajax Cape Town	ABSA Premiership	21	0			-		21	0
2010–11	Sivasspor	Süper Lig	16	0	1	0	-		17	0
2011–12	FK Baku	Azerbaijan Premier League	31	3	5	0	-		36	3
2012–13	FK Baku	Azerbaijan Premier League	18	0	2	0	2	0	22	0
2013–14	FC Botoșani	Liga I	8	0					8	0
2014	FK Liepāja	Latvian Higher League	11	0					11	0
2014–15	Nyíregyháza Spartacus	Nemzeti Bajnokság	9	0	2	0			11	0
2015	FK Liepāja	Latvian Higher League	14	1	0	0			14	1
2016	FK Liepāja	Latvian Higher League	20	0	1	0	2	0	23	0
2017	FK Liepāja	Latvian Higher League	19	0	4	0	1	0	24	0
2018	FK Liepāja	Latvian Higher League	11	0	1	0	1	0	13	0
2019	FK Liepāja	Latvian Higher League	26	0	1	0	4	0	31	0
2020	FK Liepāja	Latvian Higher League	2	0	0	0	0	0	2	0
Total	Latvia		290	10	7	0	25	4	322	14
Total	South Africa		21	0			0	0	21	0
Total	Turkey		16	3	1	0	0	0	17	0
Total	Azerbaijan		49	3	3	0	0	0	58	3
Total	Romania		8	0	0	0	0	0	8	0
Total	Hungary		9	0	2	0	0	0	11	0
Career total			393	16	13	0	25	4	431	20

== Honours ==
Club

- Virsliga: 2005, 2009, 2015; runner-up 2003, 2004, 2006, 2007, 2008, 2017
- Latvian Cup: 2006, 2017, 2020
- Baltic League: 2007
- Azerbaijan Cup: 2011–12

International

- Baltic Cup: 2008
