= Viktors Ņesterenko =

Latvian football coach (born 1954)

Personal information
- Date of birth: 3 May 1954 (age 72)
- Place of birth: Nikopol, Ukrainian SSR
- Position: Forward

Team information
- Current team: Fk Union (Manager)

Youth career
- Kolos Nikopol
- 1971: Dnepr Dnepropetrovsk

Senior career*
Years	Team	Apps	(Gls)
1971–1972	Elektrons Rīga		
1973–1977	Daugava Rīga	87	(18)
1978–1979	Zvejnieks Liepāja	66	(6)
1980–1986	Celtnieks Rīga		
1988–1989	RAF Jelgava		

Managerial career
- 1988–1992: RAF Jelgava
- 1992–1993: Prykarpattia Ivano-Frankivsk
- 1994: DAG Riga
- 1995: DAG Liepāja
- 1996–1997: Universitāte Rīga
- 1998: Dinaburg Daugavpils
- 2001–2003: FK Rīga
- 2004: Dinamo Brest
- 2009–2012: Karelia-Discovery Petrozavodsk
- 2013–2014: Lokomotiv Jõhvi
- 2016: FK Progress
- 2017–2018: AFA Olaine
- 2019: JK Järve (assistant)
- 2019–2021: SK Super Nova
- 2022–: Fk Union
- * Club domestic league appearances and goals

Viktors Ņesterenko (born 3 May 1954) is a Latvian football coach and former player.

== Career ==
=== Playing career ===
Ņesterenko was born in Ukraine and played football there with the reserves of FC Dnipro Dnipropetrovsk. In 1971 Ņesterenko was invited to move to Riga, Latvia, for studies. In 1971, Ņesterenko joined Elektrons Rīga and played for the youth squad of Daugava Rīga. He spent the entire 1972 season in the Latvian league with Elektrons, but in 1973 when Daugava Rīga was in desperate need for a scoring forward, Ņesterenko was offered a position with Daugava. In the first season, he made 5 appearances and scored 5 goals. His best season with Daugava was in 1975 when the club qualified for the first Soviet league, but in 1976 Ņesterenko was injured for a big part of the season. Ņesterenko tried to secure a position in Kolos Nikopol but that didn't bring him much success. In 1978 and 1979 he played with Zvejnieks Liepāja, and for half a season he played with Spartak Kostroma.

Ņesterenko tried to return to Daugava Rīga more than once, but the club's head coach didn't believe that Ņesterenko could still be of any use to the club, so Ņesterenko settled with Celtnieks Rīga where he soon switched from playing to coaching.

=== Coaching career ===
With Ņesterenko as a playing coach, Celtnieks Rīga won the Latvian Cup three times in a row - from 1984 to 1986. The team also secured two second-place finishes in the Latvian league.

In 1988, Ņesterenko was offered a coaching position with the second team of RAF Jelgava (the first team played in the second Soviet division, the second team in the Latvian league). RAF won the Latvian league both seasons which Ņesterenko spent with the club. After the 1989 season the two RAF clubs merged and Ņesterenko became the head coach of a club playing in the lowest division of Soviet football. The club had many young talented players, including future Latvia national football team players Vladimirs Babičevs, Igors Troickis and Dzintars Sproģis. In his second season with RAF, Ņesterenko's coaching fell one extra point short of earning the club a promotion to a higher division, but the collapse of the Soviet Union ended that dream. Ņesterenko left RAF in the middle of the 1992 Virslīga season; the club went lost the gold medals to Skonto FC in an extra game.

Ņesterenko signed a 1+1 year deal with Prykarpattya Ivano-Frankivsk which had been just relegated to the Ukrainian Premier League and was hoping to return there after one season. Under his management, the club finished 4th in out of 22 teams, which wasn't enough for Ņesterenko to keep his job with the club.

In 1994 Ņesterenko took up with his next club - DAG Rīga (former VEF). DAG had a good squad which included Andrejs Piedels, Vits Rimkus, Artūrs Zakreševskis and Dzintars Sproģis. In the Latvian league the club finished 3rd that year and reached the Latvian Cup final. After the season the club experienced financial difficulties, merged with Baltika Liepāja and relocated to Liepāja. Almost all the players had left DAG, the club had no financial support the first half of the season, and the only money came in from the transfer of Dzintars Sproģis to Spartak Moscow. The season was disappointing (especially the first half), however the club again reached the cup final. That season, DAG had young players like Viktors Dobrecovs and veterans such as Jānis Intenbergs and Ainārs Linards. After the season Ņesterenko was asked to leave Liepāja.

In 1996 Ņesterenko returned to RAF which had relocated from Jelgava to Riga. The season in Virslīga wasn't especially successful, but Ņesterenko and his club earned his first trophy in independent Latvia - RAF won the Latvian Cup by beating Skonto FC in overtime in a thrilling match. For the 1997 season, the club was renamed to Universitāte Rīga, but the change did not help - it finished sixth in the Latvian league, and after the season the club dissolved leaving Ņesterenko without a club again. In 1997 Ņesterenko was a candidate for head coach position with the newly founded FK Ventspils but Sergei Borovski from Belarus was chosen instead.

After a brief stint of consulting work with Ranto/Miks, Ņesterenko signed for the 1998 season with Dinaburg FC, the bronze medalists and cup finalists of 1997. His first season Ņesterenko was less successful - fourth place in the league and a cup exit in the quarter-finals. Ņesterenko left Dinaburg in the middle of the season and was replaced by Roman Hryhorchuk whom Ņesterenko had coached as a player in Ivano-Frankivsk.

The next stage in Ņesterenko's career was FK Rīga for which he was an assistant coach under Jānis Gilis and later under Georgijs Gusarenko. In 2001, Ņesterenko was appointed head coach. His work with Rīga didn't bring great results - the club was stuck in mid table and lacked direction, and Ņesterenko had to leave the club after the 2003 season.

In 2004, he took up work with Dinamo Brest in Belarus but as the team failed to impress he was fired rather speedily.

His last club to date was FK Venta Ventspils, which went bankrupt in 2005. Ņesterenko started as a scouting coach, but when the club finances worsened took up the position of head coach.

In his work as club manager Ņesterenko has worked with Aleksandrs Dorofejevs in many clubs.
