= 2004 Latvian Higher League =

Latvian football league season for the highest division

Latvian Higher League
- Season: 2004
- Champions: Skonto FC
- Relegated: FC Ditton; Auda
- UEFA Champions League: Skonto FC
- UEFA Cup: FK Liepajas Metalurgs; FK Ventspils
- UEFA Intertoto Cup: Dinaburg FC
- Top goalscorer: (Russia) Aleksandr Katasonov (21 goals)

The 2004 season in the Latvian Higher League, named Virslīga, was the 14th domestic competition since the Baltic nation gained independence from the Soviet Union on 6 September 1991. Eight teams competed in this edition, with Skonto FC claiming the title.

== Final table ==
Pos	Team	Pld	W	D	L	GF	GA	GD	Pts	Qualification or relegation
1	Skonto (C)	28	22	3	3	65	18	+47	69	Qualification for Champions League first qualifying round
2	Liepājas Metalurgs	28	21	3	4	85	27	+58	66	Qualification for UEFA Cup first qualifying round
3	Ventspils	28	16	7	5	64	28	+36	55	Qualification for UEFA Cup first qualifying round
4	Dinaburg	28	10	6	12	35	36	−1	36	Qualification for Intertoto Cup first round
5	Jūrmala	28	8	10	10	30	33	−3	34	
6	Rīga	28	6	9	13	32	43	−11	27	
7	Ditton (R)	28	7	5	16	20	62	−42	26	Qualification for relegation play-offs
8	Auda (R)	28	0	1	27	13	97	−84	1	Relegation to Latvian First League

Source: RSSSF
(C) Champions; (R) Relegated

== Match table ==
First half of the season
Home \ Away	AUD	DIN	DIT	JŪR	MET	RĪG	SKO	VEN
Auda		0–5	0–2	1–2	1–7	0–2	0–4	0–3
Dinaburg	2–0		1–0	0–0	1–4	2–1	0–1	0–2
Ditton	1–0	0–4		1–1	0–3	0–0	0–4	0–8
Jūrmala	1–1	2–0	0–2		0–2	1–1	0–1	1–1
Liepājas Metalurgs	10–1	2–1	3–0	1–0		2–1	2–3	3–4
Rīga	2–1	1–1	1–2	1–0	0–2		0–2	1–4
Skonto	3–0	1–1	2–0	3–2	1–0	1–0		1–0
Ventspils	2–1	1–2	0–0	3–2	0–2	1–0	0–3	

Source: RSSSF
Legend: Blue = home team win; Yellow = draw; Red = away team win.

Second half of the season
Home \ Away	AUD	DIN	DIT	JŪR	MET	RĪG	SKO	VEN
Auda		0–3	1–2	0–1	1–6	0–4	1–6	0–6
Dinaburg	3–1		1–0	0–1	3–0	3–3	1–2	0–2
Ditton	4–0	2–0		1–1	0–4	0–1	0–4	0–4
Jūrmala	2–0	0–0	4–1		1–4	2–0	0–1	2–2
Liepājas Metalurgs	4–1	4–0	5–1	1–1		2–2	3–1	4–0
Rīga	3–1	0–0	1–1	1–1	1–2		2–4	1–3
Skonto	2–0	3–0	6–0	0–2	1–2	4–1		0–0
Ventspils	5–1	3–1	3–0	4–0	1–1	1–1	1–1	

Source: RSSSF
Legend: Blue = home team win; Yellow = draw; Red = away team win.

== Relegation play-offs ==
The matches were played on 14 and 17 November 2004.

Team 1	Agg.	Team 2	1st leg	2nd leg
Venta	2–0	Ditton	1–0	1–0

Source: RSSSF

== Top scorers ==
Rank	Player	Club	Goals
1	Aleksandr Katasonov (RUS)	FK Liepājas Metalurgs	21
2	Viktors Dobrecovs (LAT)	FK Liepājas Metalurgs	18
3	Mihails Miholaps (LAT)	Skonto FC	16
4	Gatis Kalniņš (LAT)	Skonto FC	15
4	Vīts Rimkus (LAT)	FK Ventspils	15

Source: RSSSF

== Awards ==
Best	Name	Team
Goalkeeper	Andrejs Piedels (LAT)	Skonto FC
Defender	Mihails Zemļinskis (LAT)	Skonto FC
Midfielder	Zurab Menteshashvili (GEO)	Skonto FC
Forward	Aleksandr Katasonov (RUS)	FK Liepājas Metalurgs
