= Rihards Butkus =

Latvian footballer

Personal information
- Date of birth: 25 August 1972 (age 54)
- Position: Defender

Senior career*
Years	Team	Apps	(Gls)
c. 1990	FC Daugava Riga		
1992–1993	FK Pārdaugava		
1994	DAG Rīga		
1995–1996	Amstrig / Daugava Rīga		
1999	Policija Rīga		
2000	FK Rīga		
2001	FK Valmiera		

International career
1995–1996	Latvia	3	(0)
- * Club domestic league appearances and goals

Rihards Butkus (born 25 August 1972) is a retired Latvian football defender.
