= Viktor Kuznetsov (footballer) =

Soviet footballer and Ukrainian coach

Personal information
- Full name: Viktor Vasilyevich Kuznetsov
- Date of birth: 25 February 1949 (age 77)
- Place of birth: Kamenolomnya, Crimean Oblast, Russian SFSR
- Position: Midfielder

Youth career
- 1963–1966: Trud Kamenolomnya

Senior career*
Years	Team	Apps	(Gls)
1966–1967	SC Tavriya Simferopol	39	(12)
1968–1979	FC Zorya Luhansk	318	(40)
1980–1981	FC SKA Rostov-on-Don	37	(6)
1985	FC Sokil Rovenky	19	(5)

International career
1972–1973	USSR	8	(0)

Managerial career
- 1992–1993: FC Zorya Luhansk (assistant)
- 1994: SC Tavriya Simferopol (assistant)
- 1994–1995: FC Kryvbas Kryvyi Rih
- 1995–1996: FC Azovets Mariupol (assistant)
- 1996: FC Zorya Luhansk (assistant)
- 2000: FC Shakhtar Luhansk
Medal record
Men's football
Representing Soviet Union
UEFA European U-18 Championships
Winner	1967 Türkiye
- * Club domestic league appearances and goals

Viktor Vasilyevich Kuznetsov (Russian: Виктор Васильевич Кузнецов; born 25 February 1949) is a retired Soviet football player and a Ukrainian coach.

He has three brothers Serhiy Kuznetsov, Hryhoriy Kuznetsov, and Vasyl Kuznetsov.

== Honours ==
- Soviet Top League winner: 1972.
- Soviet Cup winner: 1981.
- UEFA European Under-19 Championship winner: 1967.

== International career ==
Kuznetsov made his debut for USSR on 29 June 1972 in a friendly against Uruguay. He played in the 1974 FIFA World Cup qualifiers.
