= FC Vorskla Poltava in European football =

Ukrainian club in European football

- Club: Vorskla Poltava
- First entry: 1997–98 UEFA Cup
- Latest entry: 2023–24 UEFA Europa Conference League

Its first European competition participation occurred in 1997–98 season in UEFA Cup. Vorskla played its first game at this level away at Daugava Stadium in Riga on July 23, 1997 against the Latvian club Daugava Rīga.

Its home games are played at Vorskla Stadium.

The best achievement is reaching a group stage on a couple of occasions.

== Statistics by country ==
| Country | Club | P | W | D | L | GF | GA | GD |
|---|---|---|---|---|---|---|---|---|
| Azerbaijan | Qarabağ | 2 | 1 | 0 | 1 | 1 | 1 | 0 |
| Subtotal | | 2 | 1 | 0 | 1 | 1 | 1 | 0 |
| Belgium | Anderlecht | 2 | 0 | 0 | 2 | 0 | 4 | -4 |
| Belgium | Standard Liège | 2 | 0 | 1 | 1 | 1 | 3 | –2 |
| Subtotal | | 4 | 0 | 1 | 3 | 1 | 7 | -6 |
| Croatia | Lokomotiva Zagreb | 2 | 0 | 1 | 1 | 2 | 3 | –1 |
| Subtotal | | 2 | 0 | 1 | 1 | 2 | 3 | –1 |
| Denmark | AB | 2 | 0 | 2 | 0 | 3 | 3 | 0 |
| Denmark | Copenhagen | 2 | 0 | 1 | 1 | 1 | 2 | –1 |
| Subtotal | | 4 | 0 | 3 | 1 | 4 | 5 | -1 |
| England | Arsenal | 2 | 0 | 0 | 2 | 2 | 7 | –5 |
| Subtotal | | 2 | 0 | 0 | 2 | 2 | 7 | –5 |
| Finland | KuPS | 2 | 0 | 1 | 1 | 4 | 5 | –1 |
| Subtotal | | 2 | 0 | 1 | 1 | 4 | 5 | –1 |
| (Georgia (country)) Georgia | Dila Gori | 2 | 1 | 0 | 1 | 3 | 4 | –1 |
| Subtotal | | 2 | 1 | 0 | 1 | 3 | 4 | –1 |
| Germany | Hannover 96 | 2 | 0 | 0 | 2 | 2 | 5 | –3 |
| Subtotal | | 2 | 0 | 0 | 2 | 2 | 5 | –3 |
| Iceland | Leiftur | 2 | 2 | 0 | 0 | 6 | 0 | +6 |
| Subtotal | | 2 | 2 | 0 | 0 | 6 | 0 | +6 |
| (Republic of Ireland) Ireland | Sligo Rovers | 2 | 1 | 1 | 0 | 2 | 0 | +2 |
| Subtotal | | 2 | 1 | 1 | 0 | 2 | 0 | +2 |
| Northern Ireland | Glentoran | 2 | 2 | 0 | 0 | 5 | 0 | +5 |
| Subtotal | | 2 | 2 | 0 | 0 | 5 | 0 | +5 |
| Latvia | Daugava Rīga | 2 | 2 | 0 | 0 | 5 | 2 | +3 |
| Subtotal | | 2 | 2 | 0 | 0 | 5 | 2 | +3 |
| North Macedonia | Rabotnički | 2 | 2 | 0 | 0 | 4 | 0 | +4 |
| Subtotal | | 2 | 2 | 0 | 0 | 4 | 0 | +4 |
| Netherlands | Fortuna Sittard | 2 | 0 | 1 | 1 | 2 | 5 | –3 |
| Subtotal | | 2 | 0 | 1 | 1 | 2 | 5 | –3 |
| Portugal | Boavista | 2 | 0 | 0 | 2 | 2 | 4 | –2 |
| Portugal | Benfica | 2 | 1 | 0 | 1 | 2 | 5 | –3 |
| Portugal | Sporting | 2 | 0 | 0 | 2 | 1 | 5 | –4 |
| Subtotal | | 6 | 1 | 0 | 5 | 5 | 14 | –9 |
| Romania | Dinamo București | 2 | 2 | 0 | 0 | 5 | 3 | +2 |
| Subtotal | | 2 | 2 | 0 | 0 | 5 | 3 | +2 |
| Slovakia | Žilina | 2 | 1 | 0 | 1 | 3 | 3 | 0 |
| Subtotal | | 2 | 1 | 0 | 1 | 3 | 3 | 0 |
| Sweden | AIK | 2 | 1 | 0 | 1 | 3 | 4 | –1 |
| Subtotal | | 2 | 1 | 0 | 1 | 3 | 4 | –1 |

== Tally per competition ==
| Tournament | Pld | W | D | L | GF | GA |
|---|---|---|---|---|---|---|
| Cup / Europa League | 32 | 12 | 4 | 16 | 38 | 47 |
| Europa Conference League | 6 | 2 | 1 | 3 | 10 | 13 |
| Intertoto Cup | 6 | 2 | 3 | 1 | 11 | 8 |
| Total | 44 | 16 | 8 | 20 | 59 | 68 |

== Results ==
| Season | Competition | Round | Opponents | Home | Away | Aggregate |
|---|---|---|---|---|---|---|
| 1997–98 | UEFA Cup | 1Q | (Latvia) Daugava Rīga | 2–1 | 3–1 | 5–2 |
| 1997–98 | UEFA Cup | 2Q | (Belgium) Anderlecht | 0–2 | 0–2 | 0–4 |
| 1998 | UEFA Intertoto Cup | 1R | (Iceland) Leiftur | 3–0 | 3–0 | 6–0 |
| 1998 | UEFA Intertoto Cup | 2R | (Denmark) AB | 1–1 | 2–2 | 3–3 (a) |
| 1998 | UEFA Intertoto Cup | 3R | (Netherlands) Fortuna Sittard | 2–2 | 0–3 | 2–5 |
| 2000–01 | UEFA Cup | 1Q | (North Macedonia) Rabotnički | 2–0 | 2–0 | 4–0 |
| 2000–01 | UEFA Cup | 1R | (Portugal) Boavista | 1–2 | 1–2 | 2–4 |
| 2009–10 | UEFA Europa League | PO | (Portugal) Benfica | 2–1 | 0–4 | 2–5 |
| 2011–12 | UEFA Europa League | 2Q | (Northern Ireland) Glentoran | 3–0 | 2–0 | 5–0 |
| 2011–12 | UEFA Europa League | 3Q | (Republic of Ireland) Sligo Rovers | 0–0 | 2–0 | 2–0 |
| 2011–12 | UEFA Europa League | PO | (Romania) Dinamo București | 2–1 | 3–2 | 5–3 |
| 2011–12 | UEFA Europa League | Group B | (Germany) Hannover 96 | 1–2 | 1–3 | 4th |
| 2011–12 | UEFA Europa League | Group B | (Belgium) Standard Liège | 1–3 | 0–0 | 4th |
| 2011–12 | UEFA Europa League | Group B | (Denmark) Copenhagen | 1–1 | 0–1 | 4th |
| 2015–16 | UEFA Europa League | 3Q | (Slovakia) Žilina | 3–1 (a.e.t) | 0–2 | 3–3 (a) |
| 2016–17 | UEFA Europa League | 3Q | (Croatia) Lokomotiva | 2–3 | 0–0 | 2–3 |
| 2018–19 | UEFA Europa League | Group E | (England) Arsenal | 0–3 | 2–4 | 3rd |
| 2018–19 | UEFA Europa League | Group E | (Portugal) Sporting CP | 1–2 | 0–3 | 3rd |
| 2018–19 | UEFA Europa League | Group E | (Azerbaijan) Qarabag | 0–1 | 1–0 | 3rd |
| 2021–22 | UEFA Europa Conference League | 2Q | (Finland) KuPS | 2–3 (a.e.t.) | 2–2 | 4–5 |
| 2022–23 | UEFA Europa Conference League | 2Q | (Sweden) AIK | 3–2 | 0−2 (a.e.t.) | 3−4 |
| 2023–24 | UEFA Europa Conference League | 2Q | (Georgia (country)) Dila Gori | 2–1 | 1−3 | 3−4 |

- Q = Qualifying
- PO = Play-off
