= Jurijs Popkovs =

Latvian footballer

Personal information
- Full name: Jurijs Popkovs
- Date of birth: 6 July 1961 (age 65)
- Place of birth: Kiev, Soviet Union (now Ukraine)
- Height: 1.80 m (5 ft 11 in)
- Position: Midfielder

Senior career*
Years	Team	Apps	(Gls)
1979–1983	Dinamo Minsk	1	(0)
1984–1991	FK Daugava Rīga	309	(35)
1992	Kompar-Daugava	22	(6)
1993–1994	Visby IF Gute	43	(14)
1995–1996	Amstrig/Daugava Rīga	23	(5)

International career^{‡}
1992–1994	Latvia	18	(1)

Managerial career
- 1995–1997: Amstrig Rīga
- 1998–2000: Liepājas Metalurgs
- 2001–2002: PFK Daugava
- 2003–2006: FK Jūrmala
- 2008: FK Blāzma Rēzekne
- 2009: FK Tauras Tauragė
- 2011–2012: FK Jūrmala-VV
- 2012: FK Daugava Riga
- 2013: FK Spartaks Jūrmala
- * Club domestic league appearances and goals as of 23 February 2015 ‡ National team caps and goals as of 23 February 2015

Jurijs Popkovs (born 6 July 1961) is a Latvian football manager and former player. He last managed the Latvian Higher League club FK Spartaks Jūrmala.

== Playing career ==
Jurijs Popkovs was born in Kiev, Ukraine. His first professional club was Dynamo Minsk which he joined in 1980. In four years which he stayed with Dynamo he made only one appearance in the Soviet Top League. In 1984 Popkovs joined FK Daugava Rīga which under the management of Jānis Skredelis was then on the up-rise. With Daugava Popkovs made 309 appearances until 1991 scoring 33 goals. He rarely missed a game for Daugava and together with Aleksandr Kanischev and Genādijs Šitiks he formed the strong midfield on the Daugava squad.

In 1993 transferred to Sweden where he joined Visby IF Gute where he played for 2 seasons, scoring 14 goals in 43 matches. During the 1995 Virslīga season for which Popkovs had started with Amstrig Rīga as a player he was offered to replace club's coach Georgijs Gusarenko.

Popkovs also played for Latvia national football team in early 1990s, making in total 18 appearances for Latvia.

== Coaching career ==
Popkovs' first club as a manager was the one where he finished playing - Amstrig Riga (renamed to Daugava in 1996). In 1996 and 1997 Daugava finished second in the Latvian league behind Skonto FC, proving Popkovs as one of the best club managers in Latvia. In 1998 when Daugava was on the road to bankruptcy, Popkovs became head coach of Liepājas Metalurgs which he brought to second place in Virslīga in 1998 and 1999. In 2000 Popkovs was fired from Metalurgs as the club still couldn't stop the hegemony of Skonto in the Latvian league. In 2001, he took up PFK Daugava, a team with no big ambitions and little finance. Both the 2001 and 2002 seasons PFK Daugava finished fifth in the Latvian league, but after the 2002 the team dissolved.

In 2003 Popkovs took up the new and ambitious team FK Jūrmala with which he won the 1st Latvian league and earned a promotion for 2004 Virslīga. In 2004 Jūrmala proved itself as a tough team by finishing 5th in its debut year, just two points behind one of the league heavyweights - Dinaburg FC. However the team owners ambitions for the team to climb higher failed to materialize - in 2005 it finished 6th and in the middle of the 2006 season when Jūrmala was again struggling Popkovs was fired.

Popkovs sat without a club the entire 2007 season, but after the end of the season he was appointed head coach of FK Blāzma Rēzekne, Virslīga newcomers.

In July 2009, he moved to FK Tauras Tauragė in neighbouring Lithuania mid-way through A lyga season, but left the team in November just after the season ended.

In September 2011 he joined Jūrmala-VV in the Latvian Higher League. In March 2012 the team was renamed to Daugava Riga and he stayed in the manager's position. He left the club in December 2012, being replaced by Virginijus Liubšys.

In September 2013 Popkovs was appointed by the Latvian Higher League club FK Spartaks Jūrmala, as he replaced Aleksandrs Stradiņš, who had worked with the team since July 2013. Popkovs was replaced by Fabio Micarelli in December 2013.

Popkovs has also worked with Latvia national under-21 football team.
