= Māris Verpakovskis =

Latvian footballer (born 1979)

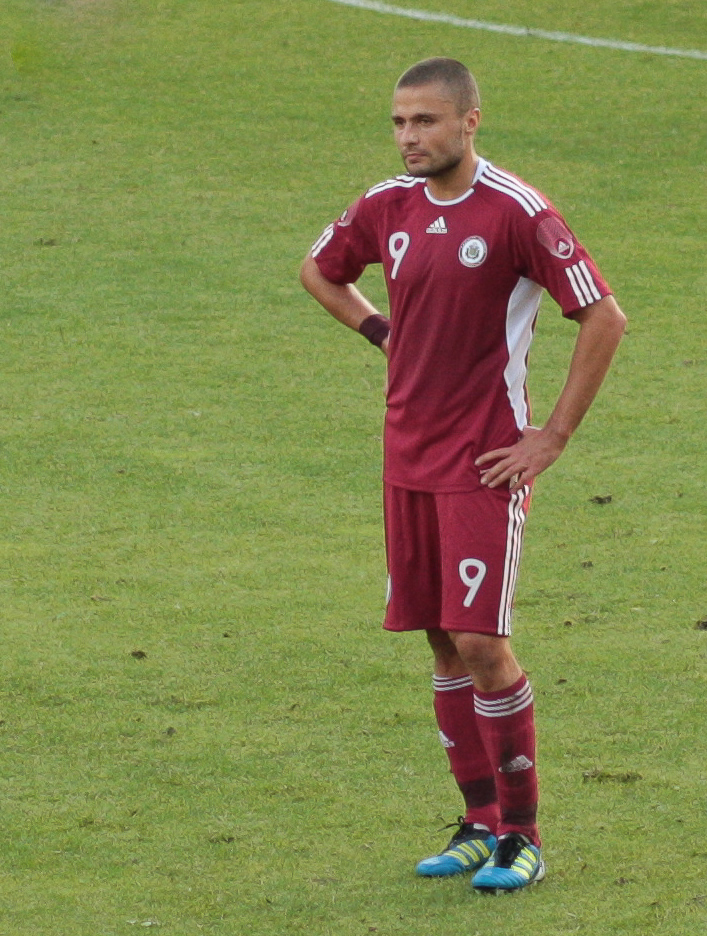
- Verpakovskis playing for Latvia in 2011

Personal information
- Date of birth: 15 October 1979 (age 47)
- Place of birth: Liepāja, Latvian SSR, Soviet Union (now Latvia)
- Height: 1.73 m (5 ft 8 in)
- Position: Striker

Team information
- Current team: Rīgas FS (Director of football)

Senior career*
Years	Team	Apps	(Gls)
1995–1996	FK Baltika	3	(0)
1996–2001	FK Liepājas Metalurgs	59	(10)
2001–2003	Skonto FC	77	(41)
2003–2011	Dynamo Kyiv	49	(11)
2007	→ Getafe (loan)	13	(1)
2007–2008	→ Hajduk Split (loan)	18	(5)
2008	→ Celta de Vigo (loan)	8	(0)
2009–2011	→ Ergotelis (loan)	47	(7)
2011–2013	FC Baku	27	(3)
2013–2014	Ergotelis	28	(5)
2014–2015	FK Liepāja	9	(1)
2017	FK Karosta	0	(0)
2019	Caramba Riga	0	(0)
2022	FK PPK/Betsafe	1	(0)
Total		338	(84)

International career
1999–2014	Latvia	104	(29)
- * Club domestic league appearances and goals

Māris Verpakovskis (born 15 October 1979), is a Latvian retired professional footballer who played as a striker. He played for the Latvia national team at UEFA Euro 2004 and is the only Latvian player to score at the end stage of a major international football tournament.

== Club career ==
=== Latvia ===
Born in Liepāja, Latvia, Verpakovskis started his career in hometown club FK Liepājas Metalurgs, for which he played from 1995 till 2001 and scored ten goals in 59 appearances. In 2001 Verpakovskis joined another Latvian side, Skonto Riga, where he scored 41 goals in 77 appearances. This period of time is known for being the peak of Verpakovskis' career. His performances were being recognized by many top European clubs, and in late 2003 he signed a contract with the Ukrainian top team Dynamo Kyiv.

=== Dynamo Kyiv ===
Soon after joining, Verpakovskis quickly earned his spot in the starting 11, scoring five goals in 11 appearances. He scored his first UEFA Champions League goal against the Turkish club Trabzonspor, which helped Dynamo Kyiv qualify for the next round and later Verpakovskis also scored a goal against Real Madrid in the group stage, helping to earn a 2–2 draw in Kyiv. Verpakovskis scored a total of three goals in the Champions League. After being honored as Dynamo Kyiv's best player of 2004 by team fans his career slowly started to decline, majorly due to a conflict with Dynamo's former coach Yozhef Sabo. From that time Verpakovkis had been loaned out for several consecutive seasons, as his contract with Dynamo was still active.

=== Loans ===
In 2007 Verpakovskis made a promising move to Spain, after he was signed on a loan deal by Getafe. Amid high competition for a place in the starting line-up, Verpakovskis scored one goal in 13 appearances. Right after returning from Spain, Verpakovskis was loaned to HNK Hajduk Split from Croatia, along with his Dynamo team-mates Florin Cernat and Goran Sablić. Verpakovskis had a good season in Hajduk, scoring five goals in 18 appearances and played the key role in team's victories. In early 2008 he suffered an injury and did not play for the remaining time of his loan at Hajduk Split. He made a short comeback to Kyiv during the summer of 2008. Verpakovskis was on a loan term with Spanish side Celta de Vigo for the 2008–09 season, playing eight league matches and scoring no goals. In 2009, Verpakovskis had to extend his contract with Dynamo Kyiv for two years and the Greek Super League club Ergotelis signed him on a two-year loan. During those two years Verpakovskis played 46 league games and scored seven goals for the club. After the season, in 2011, his loan spell ended and he returned to Kyiv.

=== FK Baku ===
In 2011 Verpakovskis signed a contract with Azerbaijan Premier League club FC Baku for one season with an option to extend it for another one alongside his international team-mate Deniss Ivanovs. In his first season there Verpakovskis scored three goals in 19 league matches and it was decided by the club's board that the contract would be extended for another season. Verpakovskis renewed his contract in June 2012. The next season was not successful for the Latvian international as he saw himself lose the place in the starting eleven, making only eight league appearances and scoring no goals. Despite scoring two goals and helping Baku grab a 3–1 victory over Sumgayit FK in the 1/8 finals of the Azerbaijan Cup on 28 November 2012, Verpakovskis left the club in January 2013.

=== Ergotelis ===
On 30 January 2013, rumours in the Greek and Latvian media appeared that Verpakovskis could rejoin the Greek Football League club Ergotelis. This information was officially confirmed by the club and the player one day later - on 31 January 2013. Verpakovskis made his return debut for the club on 20 February 2013 in a league match against Doxa Drama. On 29 April 2013, Verpakovskis scored both goals in his club's 2–0 league victory over Olympiacos Volos. Verpakovskis then scored in the last match of the season on 26 May 2013 to secure a 1–1 draw against Niki Volos. This goal and point secured Ergotelis a return to the Super League Greece. Verpakovskis made his Super League return debut on 26 August 2013 in a 2–0 victory over Levadiakos. He scored his first goal since return to the Superliga on 2 November 2013 in a 2–1 loss to PAOK On 10 November 2013, Verpakovskis scored for the second consecutive Superliga match, helping Ergotelis secure a 3–1 victory over Panthrakikos. In mid-season, January 2014, Verpakovskis informed Ergotelis that he was planning to retire in order to return to Latvia and jointly participate in establishment of a new football club in his local city Liepāja after the city's former club Liepājas Metalurgs had been dissolved. On 27 January 2014, he played his last match for Ergotelis as the club lost 1–0 to Panetolikos with Verpakovskis coming on as a late match substitute. After the game Verpakovskis was honoured by his teammates and the club's staff with the president Giannis Daskalakis handing him a special "Verpakovskis" jersey of Ergotelis and stating that "Ergotelis will be Verpakovskis' team for life and Heraklion is the place where Māris can always find his second family." Over one and a half season in Greece Verpakovskis had participated in 28 league matches and scored five goals. In a later interview Verpakovskis revealed that he had wished to finish the season in Greece but due to the limited time for establishment of a club he was forced to return to Latvia as soon as possible.

=== FK Liepāja ===
On 23 January 2014, the establishment of the newly founded Latvian Higher League club FK Liepāja was officially announced, and following his return from Greece Verpakovkis took office as the club's president. Besides the administrative work he still retains an active player's status. During the 2014 season Verpakovskis appeared in nine league matches and scored one goal. He left the club in November 2018.

=== FK RFS ===
A few days after leaving FK Liepāja, Verpakovskis was hired as director of football at FK RFS. It was confirmed on 25 November 2018.

On 31 May 2019, Verpakovskis played a game for FC Caramba Riga, playing 45 minutes and scoring a goal in a 4–0 victory, helping the team to reach the second leg of the Latvian Cup.

== International career ==
Verpakovskis made his debut for the Latvia national team on 9 September 1999 in a 2–1 victory over Greece, scoring in that match. He rose to international prominence as the highest goalscorer for Latvia in their successful UEFA Euro 2004 qualification campaign, with six goals in ten matches. He scored once for Latvia in Euro 2004 and nearly scored what could have been a candidate for goal of the tournament against Germany, dribbling on a weaving run from the halfway line and beating four German players.

Verpakovskis was Latvia's top scorer in FIFA World Cup 2006 qualification, UEFA Euro 2008 qualification, as well as the FIFA World Cup 2010 qualification. In September 2013, Verpakovskis won his 100th cap for the Latvia national team in a 1–0 World Cup qualifying defeat to Greece. On 29 May 2014, Verpakovskis played his last international match as Latvia beat Estonia in the semi-finals of the 2014 Baltic Cup. He was symbolically substituted by Edgars Gauračs just 13 minutes into the game and honoured by his teammates, national team's staff and supporters. After his retirement the national team's manager Marians Pahars referred to Verpakovskis as "a national team legend". All in all, internationally Verpakovskis has been capped 104 times for Latvia, scoring 29 goals. He is Latvia's all-time best scorer.

Verpakovskis is regarded as the most popular Latvian footballer having surpassed Marians Pahars as his country's most recognisable player. He is the leading all-time top goal scorer for Latvia, with 29 goals (As of 15 January 2015).

== Personal life ==
Verpakovskis is the son of Ilmārs Verpakovskis, a Latvian footballer active from 1979 until 1996. Verpakovskis was managed by his father who was player-manager for FK Liepājas Metalurgs in 1994. The Verpakovskis are the only father-son pair to both play for the Latvia national team.

== Career statistics ==
=== Club ===
Appearances and goals by club, season and competition
Club	Season	League			National Cup		Europe		Total	
Club	Season	Division	Apps	Goals	Apps	Goals	Apps	Goals	Apps	Goals
Baltika Liepāja	1996	Latvian Higher League	3	0					3	0
Liepājas Metalurgs	1997	Latvian Higher League	6	0					6	0
Liepājas Metalurgs	1998	Latvian Higher League	16	2					16	2
Liepājas Metalurgs	1999	Latvian Higher League	21	5					21	5
Liepājas Metalurgs	2000	Latvian Higher League	16	3					16	3
Liepājas Metalurgs	Total		59	10					59	10
Skonto	2001	Latvian Higher League	27	10					27	10
Skonto	2002	Latvian Higher League	25	9					25	9
Skonto	2003	Latvian Higher League	25	22					25	22
Skonto	Total		77	41					77	41
Dynamo Kyiv	2003–04	Premier League	11	5	2	1	0	0	13	6
Dynamo Kyiv	2004–05	Premier League	23	4	6	3	9	2	38	9
Dynamo Kyiv	2005–06	Premier League	9	1	3	2	1	0	13	3
Dynamo Kyiv	2006–07	Premier League	6	1	1	0	3	1	10	2
Dynamo Kyiv	Total		49	11	12	6	13	3	74	20
Getafe (loan)	2006–07	La Liga	13	1	5	1	—		18	2
Hajduk Split (loan)	2007–08	Prva HNL	18	5	4	0	1	0	23	5
Celta (loan)	2008–09	Segunda División	8	0	2	0	—		10	0
Ergotelis (loan)	2009–10	Super League	22	3	2	1	—		24	4
Ergotelis (loan)	2010–11	Super League	25	4	1	0	—		26	4
Ergotelis (loan)	Total		47	7	3	1	0	0	50	8
Baku	2011–12	Premier League	19	3	3	0	—		22	3
Baku	2012–13	Premier League	8	0	1	2	2	0	11	2
Baku	Total		27	3	4	2	2	0	33	5
Ergotelis	2012–13	Football League	18	3	—		—		18	3
Ergotelis	2013–14	Super League Greece	10	2	2	0	—		12	2
Ergotelis	Total		28	5	2	0	0	0	30	5
Liepāja	2014	Latvian Higher League	9	1	1	2	—		10	3
Liepāja	2015	Latvian Higher League	0	0	1	1	—		1	1
Liepāja	Total		9	1	2	3	0	0	11	4
Career total			338	84	34	13	16	3	388	100

=== International goals ===
Scores and results list Latvia's goal tally first, score column indicates score after each Verpakovskis goal.

List of international goals scored by Māris Verpakovskis
No.	Date	Venue	Opponent	Score	Result	Competition
1	9 June 1999	Athens, Greece	Greece	1–0	2–1	UEFA Euro 2000 Qualifying
2	28 February 2001	Vaduz, Liechtenstein	Liechtenstein	2–0	2–0	Friendly
3	3 July 2001	Riga, Latvia	Estonia	1–0	3–1	Baltic Cup 2001
4	21 August 2002	Riga, Latvia	Belarus	1–1	2–4	Friendly
5	7 June 2003	Budapest, Hungary	Hungary	1–0	1–3	UEFA Euro 2004 Qualifying
6	10 September 2003	Riga, Latvia	Hungary	1–0	3–1	UEFA Euro 2004 Qualifying
7	10 September 2003	Riga, Latvia	Hungary	3–0	3–1	UEFA Euro 2004 Qualifying
8	11 October 2003	Stockholm, Sweden	Sweden	1–0	1–0	UEFA Euro 2004 Qualifying
9	15 November 2003	Riga, Latvia	Turkey	1–0	1–0	UEFA Euro 2004 Qualifying
10	19 November 2003	Istanbul, Turkey	Turkey	2–2	2–2	UEFA Euro 2004 Qualifying
11	31 March 2004	Celje, Slovenia	Slovenia	1–0	1–0	Friendly
12	6 June 2004	Riga, Latvia	Azerbaijan	1–0	2–2	Friendly
13	15 June 2004	Aveiro, Portugal	Czech Republic	1–0	1–2	UEFA Euro 2004
14	8 September 2004	Luxembourg City, Luxembourg	Luxembourg	1–0	4–3	FIFA World Cup 2006 Qualifying
15	9 October 2004	Bratislava, Slovakia	Slovakia	1–0	1–4	FIFA World Cup 2006 Qualifying
16	17 November 2004	Vaduz, Liechtenstein	Liechtenstein	1–0	3–0	FIFA World Cup 2006 Qualifying
17	30 March 2005	Riga, Latvia	Luxembourg	3–0	4–0	FIFA World Cup 2006 Qualifying
18	30 March 2005	Riga, Latvia	Luxembourg	4–0	4–0	FIFA World Cup 2006 Qualifying
19	7 October 2006	Riga, Latvia	Iceland	2–0	4–0	UEFA Euro 2008 Qualifying
20	7 October 2006	Riga, Latvia	Iceland	3–0	4–0	UEFA Euro 2008 Qualifying
21	13 October 2007	Reykjavík, Iceland	Iceland	3–1	4–2	UEFA Euro 2008 Qualifying
22	13 October 2007	Reykjavík, Iceland	Iceland	4–1	4–2	UEFA Euro 2008 Qualifying
23	17 November 2007	Riga, Latvia	Liechtenstein	2–1	4–1	UEFA Euro 2008 Qualifying
24	1 April 2009	Riga, Latvia	Luxembourg	2–0	2–0	FIFA World Cup 2010 Qualifying
25	10 October 2009	Athens, Greece	Greece	1–1	2–5	FIFA World Cup 2010 Qualifying
26	10 October 2009	Athens, Greece	Greece	2–1	2–5	FIFA World Cup 2010 Qualifying
27	7 September 2010	Ta' Qali, Malta	Malta	2–0	2–0	UEFA Euro 2012 qualifying
28	9 February 2011	Antalya, Turkey	Bolivia	1–0	2–1	Friendly
29	12 October 2012	Bratislava, Slovakia	Slovakia	1–2	1–2	FIFA World Cup 2014 Qualifying

== Honours ==
Skonto

- Latvian Higher League: 2001, 2002
- Latvian Cup: 2001, 2002

Dynamo Kyiv

- Ukrainian Premier League: 2004
- Ukrainian Cup: 2005, 2006

FC Baku

- Azerbaijan Cup: 2012

FK Liepāja

- Latvian Higher League: 2015

Latvia

- Baltic Cup winner: 2001, 2003, 2008, 2014

Individual

- Latvian Man Of The Year: 2003–04
- Top scorer in the history of the national team with 29 goals
- Latvian Footballer of the Year: 2003, 2004
- Dynamo Kyiv player of the year: 2004

== See also ==
- List of men's footballers with 100 or more international caps
