= Sergejs Ivanovs =

Latvian footballer

Personal information
- Date of birth: 2 May 1971 (age 55)
- Position: Midfielder

Senior career*
Years	Team	Apps	(Gls)
1989–1992	RAF Jelgava		
1993	Vidus Riga		
1994	DAG Riga		
1995	Amstrig Riga		
1996–1997	Daugava Riga		
1998–1999	FK Ventspils		
2000	Metalurgs Liepāja		
2001	Daugava Riga		

International career
1994–1997	Latvia	2	(0)
- * Club domestic league appearances and goals

Sergejs Ivanovs (born 2 May 1971) is a retired Latvian football midfielder.
