= 2003 Latvian Higher League =

Latvian football league season for the highest division

Latvian Higher League
- Season: 2003
- Champions: Skonto FC
- Relegated: Gauja; RKB-Arma
- UEFA Champions League: Skonto FC
- UEFA Cup: FK Liepajas Metalurgs; FK Ventspils
- UEFA Intertoto Cup: Dinaburg FC
- Top goalscorer: (Latvia) Viktors Dobrecovs (36 goals)

The 2003 season in the Latvian Higher League, named Virslīga, was the thirteenth domestic competition since the Baltic nation gained independence from the Soviet Union on 6 September 1991. Eight teams competed in this edition, with Skonto FC claiming the title.

== Final table ==
Pos	Team	Pld	W	D	L	GF	GA	GD	Pts	Qualification or relegation
1	Skonto (C)	28	23	4	1	91	9	+82	73	Qualification for Champions League first qualifying round
2	Liepājas Metalurgs	28	22	2	4	100	29	+71	68	Qualification for UEFA Cup first qualifying round
3	Ventspils	28	19	4	5	89	18	+71	61	Qualification for UEFA Cup first qualifying round
4	Dinaburg	28	13	5	10	43	36	+7	44	Qualification for Intertoto Cup first round
5	Rīga	28	8	5	15	34	63	−29	29	
6	Gauja (R)	28	6	5	17	27	70	−43	23	Relegation to Latvian First League (Note: Gauja were relegated to the lower league due to financial difficulties.)
7	Auda	28	4	1	23	21	88	−67	13	
8	RKB-Arma (R)	28	2	4	22	23	115	−92	10	Relegation to Latvian First League

Source: RSSSF
(C) Champions; (R) Relegated

== Match table ==
First half of the season
Home \ Away	AUD	DIN	GAU	MET	RĪG	RKB	SKO	VEN
Auda		0–1	0–2	1–4	1–1	1–0	0–7	0–7
Dinaburg	1–0		1–0	4–2	1–0	6–0	0–2	0–2
Gauja	3–2	2–3		1–6	1–5	2–0	0–2	1–1
Liepājas Metalurgs	6–0	2–0	4–2		6–2	8–0	2–0	2–1
Rīga	2–1	1–1	0–0	1–3		3–1	0–2	0–6
RKB-Arma	6–1	0–1	1–1	1–7	1–3		0–6	0–7
Skonto	4–0	2–0	3–0	0–0	0–0	5–0		2–1
Ventspils	5–0	0–0	4–0	2–1	4–0	4–0	0–0	

Source: RSSSF
Legend: Blue = home team win; Yellow = draw; Red = away team win.

Second half of the season
Home \ Away	AUD	DIN	GAU	MET	RĪG	RKB	SKO	VEN
Auda		0–3	3–1	0–2	0–1	1–0	1–4	0–4
Dinaburg	3–1		4–0	0–2	4–0	2–2	0–4	2–2
Gauja	1–0	0–0		1–3	2–1	3–0	0–2	0–1
Liepājas Metalurgs	3–0	3–0	9–2		5–0	8–0	0–0	3–2
Rīga	3–2	0–2	3–1	0–1		4–0	2–7	0–2
RKB-Arma	2–5	4–2	1–1	2–6	2–2		0–2	0–7
Skonto	8–0	2–1	6–0	5–1	4–0	8–0		2–1
Ventspils	4–1	3–1	5–0	2–1	3–0	9–0	0–2	

Source: RSSSF
Legend: Blue = home team win; Yellow = draw; Red = away team win.

== Top scorers ==
Rank	Player	Club	Goals
1	Viktors Dobrecovs (LAT)	FK Liepājas Metalurgs	36
2	Ģirts Karlsons (LAT)	FK Liepājas Metalurgs	26
3	Māris Verpakovskis (LAT)	Skonto FC	22
4	Vīts Rimkus (LAT)	FK Ventspils	20
5	Gatis Kalniņš (LAT)	Skonto FC	12

== Awards ==
Best	Name	Team
Goalkeeper	Andrejs Piedels (LAT)	Skonto FC
Defender	Mihails Zemļinskis (LAT)	Skonto FC
Midfielder	Valentīns Lobaņovs (LAT)	Skonto FC
Forward	Māris Verpakovskis (LAT)	Skonto FC
