= Jānis Rinkus =

Latvian footballer

Personal information
- Full name: Jānis Rinkus
- Date of birth: 12 April 1977 (age 49)
- Place of birth: Liepāja, Latvian SSR, Soviet Union
- Position: Midfielder

Team information
- Current team: FC Ditton

Senior career*
| Years | Team | Apps | (Gls) |
| 1993 | Olimpija Liepāja | 3 | (0) |
| 1994 | FK Liepāja | 20 | (0) |
| 1995 | DAG Liepāja | 17 | (0) |
| 1996 | Baltika Liepāja | 26 | (1) |
| 1997 | Liepājas Metalurgs | 23 | (0) |
| 1998 | Liepājas Metalurgs | 15 | (1) |
| 1999 | Liepājas Metalurgs | 21 | (1) |
| 2000 | Liepājas Metalurgs | 18 | (1) |
| 2001 | FK Riga | 21 | (2) |
| 2002 | Liepājas Metalurgs | 24 | (5) |
| 2003 | Liepājas Metalurgs | 26 | (2) |
| 2004 | Liepājas Metalurgs | 27 | (8) |
| 2005 | Vetra Vilnius | 24 | (2) |
| 2006 | FC Ditton | 17 | (0) |
| 2007 | FC Ditton | 0 | (0) |

International career
- Latvia
- * Club domestic league appearances and goals

Jānis Rinkus (born 12 April 1977) is a football midfielder from Latvia. His current club is FC Ditton.
