= Serhiy Kuznetsov (footballer, born 1950) =

Soviet footballer (born 1950)

Personal information
- Full name: Serhiy Vasylyovych Kuznetsov
- Date of birth: 30 November 1950 (age 75)
- Place of birth: Kamenolomnya, Crimean Oblast, Russian SFSR
- Positions: Defender; midfielder

Senior career*
Years	Team	Apps	(Gls)
?	SC Tavriya Simferopol		
1970–1974	FC Zorya Luhansk	82	(3)
1975–1977	FC Dynamo Kyiv	41	(0)
1978	Zenit Leningrad	23	(3)
1979–1980	FC SKA Rostov-on-Don	32	(3)

International career
1972	USSR	3	(0)
- * Club domestic league appearances and goals

Serhiy Vasylyovych Kuznetsov (Ukrainian: Сергій Васильович Кузнецов, Russian: Серге́й Васильевич Кузнецов; born 30 November 1950) is a retired Ukrainian and Soviet football player. He is the brother of Viktor Kuznetsov. He is often confused with other Soviet footballers of the same name. Since retiring, he has moved to Kyiv and is a conductor on one of the trains between Kyiv and Moscow.

== Honours ==
- Soviet Top League winner: 1972, 1975, 1977.
- UEFA Cup Winners' Cup winner: 1975.

== International career ==
Kuznetsov made his debut for USSR on 29 June 1972 in a friendly match against Uruguay. He was known for his speed, excellent dribbling, and accurate long passes. After retiring, he was briefly the coach of "Yugostal" a club team from Yenakiyevo from 1990 to 1991.
