= Yevgeni Landyrev =

Russian footballer

Personal information
- Full name: Yevgeni Aleksandrovich Landyrev
- Date of birth: 29 August 1977 (age 49)
- Place of birth: Primorsko-Akhtarsk, Russian SFSR
- Height: 1.95 m (6 ft 5 in)
- Position: Striker

Senior career*
Years	Team	Apps	(Gls)
1997–1998	Kuban Slavyansk-na-Kubani	45	(8)
1998–1999	Rostselmash Rostov-on-Don	2	(0)
2000–2003	Ventspils	74	(43)
2003–2004	Litex Lovech	10	(4)
2004	Kuban Krasnodar	4	(1)
2004	Ventspils	8	(4)
2005	FC Oryol	31	(4)
2006–2007	FK Rīga	18	(5)
- * Club domestic league appearances and goals

Yevgeni Aleksandrovich Landyrev (Russian: Евгений Александрович Ландырев; born 29 August 1977) is a former Russian professional footballer.

== Club career ==
He made his professional debut in the Russian Third League in 1997 for FC Kuban Slavyansk-na-Kubani. He played 1 game in the UEFA Intertoto Cup 1999 for FC Rostselmash Rostov-on-Don.

== Honours ==
- Latvian Higher League runner-up: 2000, 2001, 2002
- Latvian Higher League 3rd place: 2004
