= Jurijs Molotkovs =

Latvian footballer

Personal information
- Date of birth: 6 June 1974 (age 52)
- Position: Midfielder

Senior career*
Years	Team	Apps	(Gls)
- DJSS Daugavpils
- Ķīmiķis Daugavpils
–1997	Lokomotiv Daugavpils		
1997–1998	FK Daugava		
1999–2000	FK Rīga		
2001–2002	Dinaburg FC		
2002–2003	FC Ditton		

International career
1998	Latvia	1	(0)
- * Club domestic league appearances and goals

Jurijs Molotkovs (born 6 June 1974) is a retired Latvian football midfielder.
