= Torpedo Rīga =

Defunct association football club in Latvia

| Home colours | Away colours |

Torpedo Rīga was a football club that played in Riga. The club played in the Latvian league with good success from 1979 to 2000 when it merged with Policijas FK.

== History ==
=== As Torpedo Rīga ===
Torpedo Rīga was a football club which was supported by the union of Latvian taxicab drivers. As the Latvian league was amateur then (at least—partially), all Torpedo footballers in addition to playing football also had to perform duties as taxi drivers (but, of course, to a lesser extent than regular taxi drivers). As taxi driving was then considered a relatively easy job with rather good pay and the club also paid some bonuses, it attracted several former professionals with experience playing with Daugava Rīga and Zvejnieks Liepāja, for example, Grigorijs Kuzņecovs.

For a couple of decades the club had been playing in lower Latvian football divisions (before Torpedo its name was FK RTP—Riga Taxi Park). In 1963 it even played in the Latvian Cup final, but a place in the top league it earned only after the 1978 season.

In its debut season in the Latvian league in 1979 Torpedo won 13 out of 26 matches and finished a respectable 4th from 14 teams. Several next seasons were significantly less successful, but the mid-1980s brought breakthrough for Torpedo coached by Arkādijs Perkins. The first sign of it came in 1982 as Torpedo reached the Latvian Cup final. Still it came rather unexpected when Torpedo won the Latvian league in 1984. In 1986 the club won another league title, with players like Jurijs Andrejevs and Einārs Gņedojs on the squad. In 1987 Torpedo won the Latvian league for the third and final time, however it remained one of the top squads in Latvia before the country regained independence. In 1989 it won the Latvian Cup by beating Celtnieks Rīga in the final.

The first season in the independent Virslīga wasn't good for Torpedo which had financial difficulties and had to settle for the 8th place from 12 clubs. After the 1992 season the club changed its name to Vidus Rīga (and lost its connection with taxi driving).

=== As Vidus Rīga ===
As Vidus Rīga the club played for two seasons, neither of which was especially successful. The club (still coached by Perkins) had several players including Artūrs Zakreševskis and Sergejs Ivanovs, however without a strong budget the club wasn't able reach significant results. After the 1994 season a new sponsor came to the club bringing it a new name—Amstrig.

=== As Amstrig Rīga ===
The new name brought several new players and a new manager—former Daugava Rīga player Georgijs Gusarenko. The squad included Andrejs Piedels, Vladimirs Draguns, Vits Rimkus, Rihards Butkus and Gints Gilis. Still the most important newcomer for Amstrig in 1995 proved to be Mihails Miholaps from Russia who with 11 goals was the club's best goalscorer. However, as the results for the club didn't correspond to its ambitions, Gusarenko had to leave and another former Daugava veteran Jurijs Popkovs took over coaching. The 1995 season ended with a 5th-place finish for Amstrig, but during the following season as the Amstrig company no longer could support the club, it changed its name again, this time to Daugava Rīga.

=== As Daugava Rīga ===
In 1996 Daugava made a sensation in Virslīga as it finished 2nd behind Skonto FC. That was mostly the result of Mihails Miholaps scoring 33 goals during the season. This result gave Daugava a chance to play in the UEFA Cup.

In 1997 it was unlikely that Daugava could repeat the previous year achievements, as the club ran into serious financial difficulties which were partly solved by selling the club's best player Miholaps to Skonto FC. The most notable newcomer for the club was veteran Igors Stepanovs (senior). Yet Daugava stroke again as Popkovs brought it to second straight silver medals finish in Virslīga. In the UEFA Cup the results were less successful as Daugava was beaten in the first qualifying round by FC Vorskla Poltava from Ukraine.

Still the season ended on a very minor note—the club was on the verge of bankruptcy again, Popkovs left it for FHK Liepājas Metalurgs, several important players also left including Andrejs Piedels and Aleksandrs Stradiņš. The club was renamed to LU/Daugava Rīga and got a new head coach in the person of Igors Kļosovs.

=== As LU/Daugava Rīga ===
In 1998 the only notable newcomer for Daugava was Dzintars Sproģis but the club's losses were much more significant and during the season its financial situation only worsened. So there was no wonder that its start in the UEFA cup was disastrous. In the Latvian league Daugava also wasn't anymore the force that it had been under Popkovs—only 6th place form 8 teams. After the season because of financial difficulties Daugava gave up its place in Virslīga and started the 1999 season in 1. līga and nearly half of its players joined the newly founded FK Rīga. Those included Igors Korabļovs, Vsevolods Līdaks, Dzintars Sproģis, Renārs Vucāns and Aleksejs Sarando.

In 1999 LU/Daugava won the competition in the 1st league and earned a place in Virslīga for the 2000 season. However the club was financially very weak for Virslīga and it had few players who were known even in Latvia. Only veteran Boriss Monjaks and Vsevolods Līdaks could be called as such. With only 2 wins in 28 matches Daugava finished last in Virslīga and after the season merged with another struggling club—Policijas FK thus form PFK Daugava.

== Managers ==
- 19??–1994: (Latvia) Arkādijs Perkins
- 1995: (Latvia) Georgijs Gusarenko
- 1996–1997: (Latvia) Jurijs Popkovs
- 1998–2000: (Latvia) Igors Kļosovs

== Achievements ==
- Latvian Cup: 1

1989

- Latvian League winners: 3

1984, 1986, 1987
