= Renārs Vucāns =

Latvian footballer

Personal information
- Date of birth: 4 November 1974 (age 51)
- Position: Midfielder

Senior career*
| Years | Team | Apps | (Gls) |
| 1994 | FK Pārdaugava | | |
| 1995–1996 | Skonto FC | | |
| 1997–1998 | FSK Daugava 90 | | |
| 1999 | FK Rīga | | |
| 2000 | Skonto FC | | |
| 2001 | FK Auda | | |

International career
| 2000 | Latvia | 3 | (0) |
- * Club domestic league appearances and goals

Renārs Vucāns (born 4 November 1974) is a retired Latvian football midfielder. He appeared in 4 matches and has a height of 1,75 m.
