= Grigorijs Kuzņecovs =

Soviet-Latvian footballer

Grigorijs Kuzņecovs (born 1943) is a former Soviet-Latvian football midfielder who played with FK Daugava Rīga from 1967 to 1973.

Kuzņecovs was born in Crimea. He started his career with Kolgospnik Rivne, then moved to Volyn Lutsk but he made himself really known only when he moved to Daugava Rīga in 1967. Kuzņecovs was good in tackling and ball control, had a good technique, but his weaker side was thinking ahead and taking unexpected decisions. With Daugava he made 213 appearances scoring 19 goals. Later he played with Torpedo Rīga.
