= 2007 Latvian Higher League =

Latvian football league season for the highest division

Latvian Higher League
- Season: 2007
- Champions: FK Ventspils
- UEFA Champions League: FK Ventspils
- UEFA Cup: FK Liepajas Metalurgs
- UEFA Intertoto Cup: FK Riga
- Top goalscorer: (Latvia) Vits Rimkus (20 goals)

The 2007 Latvian Higher League season was the 16th Virslīga season. It started on 7 April 2007 and finished on 4 December 2007. Eight teams competed in the league, playing each other four times over the course of the season, twice at home and twice away.

== Season details ==
For the second time in a row FK Ventspils won the championship. In mid-season FK Liepājas Metalurgs had a lead of 11 points over Ventspils who won their last 11 games, conceding just one goal. FK Rīga finished third for the first time in the club's history. FC Skonto finished the season without winning any competitions for the first time, and also for the first time they would not compete in any of the European cups in 2008 as one of the UEFA Cup qualifying spots was taken by JFC Olimps Rīga for reaching the Latvian Cup final. Vīts Rimkus from Ventspils was the top scorer with 20 goals.

At the end of the season the Latvian Football Federation announced that the Virslīga would expand to 10 clubs for the 2008 season. Therefore, no club was relegated to the First League. The last time there were ten clubs in the Virslīga was in the 1996 season.

== League standings ==
| Pos | Team | Pld | W | D | L | GF | GA | GD | Pts | Qualification |
|---|---|---|---|---|---|---|---|---|---|---|
| 1 | Ventspils (C) | 28 | 18 | 6 | 4 | 59 | 16 | +43 | 60 | Qualification for Champions League first qualifying round |
| 2 | Liepājas Metalurgs | 28 | 18 | 4 | 6 | 42 | 21 | +21 | 58 | Qualification for UEFA Cup first qualifying round |
| 3 | Rīga | 28 | 17 | 6 | 5 | 48 | 28 | +20 | 57 | Qualification for Intertoto Cup first round |
| 4 | Skonto | 28 | 16 | 7 | 5 | 54 | 27 | +27 | 55 | |
| 5 | Daugava Daugavpils | 28 | 9 | 6 | 13 | 33 | 38 | −5 | 33 | |
| 6 | Jūrmala | 28 | 7 | 5 | 16 | 28 | 51 | −23 | 26 | |
| 7 | Dinaburg | 28 | 6 | 2 | 20 | 23 | 58 | −35 | 20 | |
| 8 | Olimps Rīga | 28 | 2 | 2 | 24 | 15 | 63 | −48 | 8 | |

(C) Champions

== Match table ==
First half of the season
| Home \ Away | DAU | DIN | JŪR | MET | OLI | RĪG | SKO | VEN |
|---|---|---|---|---|---|---|---|---|
| Daugava Daugavpils | | 1–3 | 1–0 | 1–2 | 2–0 | 1–3 | 1–3 | 1–1 |
| Dinaburg | 2–1 | | 0–0 | 1–2 | 1–0 | 0–2 | 2–2 | 2–4 |
| Jūrmala | 1–2 | 1–0 | | 3–4 | 5–0 | 0–0 | 1–2 | 3–1 |
| Liepājas Metalurgs | 3–1 | 2–1 | 2–0 | | 1–0 | 0–0 | 0–2 | 2–0 |
| Olimps Rīga | 1–1 | 0–2 | 0–2 | 1–2 | | 2–3 | 1–4 | 1–1 |
| Rīga | 3–2 | 2–0 | 2–0 | 3–0 | 3–2 | | 1–0 | 1–0 |
| Skonto | 3–1 | 3–0 | 2–2 | 0–4 | 1–0 | 4–4 | | 0–0 |
| Ventspils | 3–1 | 4–0 | 1–1 | 0–2 | 2–0 | 1–0 | 2–0 | |

Legend: Blue = home team win; Yellow = draw; Red = away team win.

Second half of the season
| Home \ Away | DAU | DIN | JŪR | MET | OLI | RĪG | SKO | VEN |
|---|---|---|---|---|---|---|---|---|
| Daugava Daugavpils | | 1–0 | 5–0 | 0–1 | 1–0 | 2–2 | 1–1 | 0–0 |
| Dinaburg | 0–2 | | 3–0 | 0–1 | 1–2 | 0–1 | 0–4 | 0–3 |
| Jūrmala | 0–1 | 3–0 | | 1–1 | 0–2 | 2–0 | 0–1 | 0–1 |
| Liepājas Metalurgs | 0–0 | 4–1 | 3–0 | | 1–0 | 2–0 | 0–1 | 0–2 |
| Olimps Rīga | 0–1 | 2–3 | 1–2 | 0–3 | | 0–2 | 0–3 | 0–5 |
| Rīga | 2–1 | 3–1 | 2–1 | 2–0 | 4–0 | | 2–2 | 0–0 |
| Skonto | 3–1 | 2–0 | 4–0 | 0–0 | 3–0 | 3–0 | | 0–1 |
| Ventspils | 1–0 | 6–0 | 10–0 | 1–0 | 4–0 | 2–1 | 3–1 | |

Legend: Blue = home team win; Yellow = draw; Red = away team win.

== Top scorers ==
| Rank | Player | Club | Goals |
|---|---|---|---|
| 1 | Vits Rimkus (LAT) | FK Ventspils | 20 |
| 2 | Andrei Nikolayev (RUS) | FK Rīga | 15 |
| 3 | Ģirts Karlsons (LAT) | FK Liepājas Metalurgs | 12 |
| 4 | Mikalay Ryndzyuk (BLR) | FK Daugava Daugavpils | 11 |
| 5 | Vitālijs Astafjevs (LAT) | Skonto FC | 7 |
| 5 | Kristaps Blanks (LAT) | Skonto FC | 7 |
| 5 | Artjoms Rudņevs (LAT) | FK Daugava Daugavpils | 7 |
| 5 | Aleksejs Višņakovs (LAT) | Skonto FC | 7 |
| 5 | Jurijs Žigajevs (LAT) | FK Rīga | 7 |
