= Artūrs Zakreševskis =

Latvian footballer

Personal information
- Full name: Artūrs Zakreševskis
- Date of birth: 7 August 1971 (age 55)
- Place of birth: Riga, Latvian SSR, Soviet Union
- Position: Defender

Senior career*
Years	Team	Apps	(Gls)
1993–1994	Vidus Riga	18	(1)
1995	RAF Jelgava	22	(1)
1996–1998	Daugava Riga	71	(13)
1999–2000	Liepājas Metalurgs	50	(7)
2001–2006	Skonto Riga	102	(10)
2007	FK Rīga	17	(1)
2008	FK Jūrmala	21	(2)
Total		301	(35)

International career
1995–2007	Latvia	55	(1)
- * Club domestic league appearances and goals

Artūrs Zakreševskis (born 7 August 1971) is a former football defender from Latvia and is currently the assistant of Latvia U-15 team. He is currently a member of Latvia national beach soccer team too.

He started his career in Vidus Riga, and has since played for RAF Jelgava, Daugava Riga, FHK Liepājas Metalurgs, FC Skonto and now FK Rīga.

He debuted for the Latvia national team in 1995, and was included in the Euro 2004 squad. He has played 55 international matches and scored one goal.

== Career statistics ==
=== International goals ===
#	Date	Venue	Opponent	Score	Result	Competition
1.	3 December 2004	Bahrain National Stadium, Riffa, Bahrain	Bahrain	2-2	Draw	Bahrain P.M. Cup
Correct as of 7 October 2015
