= Georgijs Gusarenko =

Latvian footballer, inspector, and manager

Georgijs Gusarenko (born 1937) is a Latvian football inspector and manager and former footballer.

Gusarenko made his first steps in football in the sports school Daugava in Riga. In 1959 he played in the reserves squad of FC Dynamo Moscow. From 1960 to 1962 he played with Daugava Rīga in the Soviet Top League. When Daugava was relegated to the first league, Gusarenko left the club for Zvejnieks Liepāja which was playing in the second soviet league. With Kompresors Rīga and Elektrons Rīga he worked for some time as both footballer and manager, he was coaching Daugava both as general manager and as assistant (he was assistant of Jānis Skredelis from 1982 to 1988).

In the independent Republic of Latvia Gusarenko worked with Amstrig Rīga, Policijas FK and FK Rīga as head coach. Now he works as football inspector in the Latvian Virslīga.
