= Vladimirs Koļesņičenko =

Latvian-Russian footballer

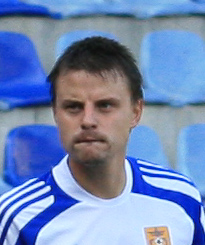
- Koļesņičenko playing for FK Ventspils

Personal information
- Full name: Vladimirs Koļesņičenko
- Date of birth: 4 May 1980 (age 46)
- Place of birth: Riga, Soviet Union (now Republic of Latvia)
- Height: 1.78 m (5 ft 10 in)
- Position: Attacking midfielder

Senior career*
Years	Team	Apps	(Gls)
1996	Skonto-Metāls	27	(1)
1997–2002	Skonto Riga	121	(52)
2003	Torpedo-Metalurg	7	(0)
2003–2004	Skonto Riga	23	(5)
2004	FC Moscow	1	(0)
2005	FK Venta Kuldiga	0	(0)
2006–2008	FK Ventspils	64	(8)
2009	FC Inter Baku	9	(1)
2009	Skonto Riga	10	(3)
2010	Chornomorets Odesa	6	(0)
2011	Skonto Riga	10	(1)
Total		278	(71)

International career
1997–2011	Latvia	47	(6)
- * Club domestic league appearances and goals

Vladimirs Koļesņičenko (Russian: Владимир Колесниченко; born 4 May 1980 in Riga) is a retired Latvian footballer and the former chairman of Latvian Higher League club Skonto Riga.

== Career ==
=== Club career ===
Being a member of Skonto Riga footballing system, Koļesņičenko started his career in 1996 with Skonto-Metāls, later joining the same club in 1997, but this time with a different name - Skonto Riga. He played there until 2002, becoming Latvian Higher League top scorer in 2000.

In 2003, he left his native Latvia, joining Russian club Torpedo-Metalurg. After an unsuccessful period with this team (only 7 matches played and no goals scored) he returned to Skonto Riga in 2004. In the same year another challenge from Russia came Koļesņičenko's way, as he joined FC Moscow.

This change was also unsuccessful, and after playing only one match, he yet again returned to Latvia, this time with the newly created and ambitious FK Venta from the city of Kuldīga. The club's ambitions were high, but its finances turned out to be just a bubble as the club went bankrupt and could not even manage to finish its first season in the top-flight soccer.

In 2006 Koļesņičenko joined FK Ventspils, playing there for 2 years and becoming a vital first eleven player. In 2009 Vladimirs accepted a challenge from Azerbaijan, joining his fellow international teammates Andrejs Rubins and Ģirts Karlsons at Inter Baku. He soon returned to Latvia, continuing to struggle abroad. Yet again it was Skonto Riga, who took him under their wing.

In 2010, he joined Chornomorets Odesa, but could not help the club secure a place in the Ukrainian Premier League. After only six games with no goals he was released. Koļesņičenko faced several personal problems and could not find a club for almost a year. In 2011, he was signed yet again by Skonto Riga, where he finished his professional career with ten games and one goal, retiring in August 2011, being just 31 years old.

=== International career ===
Koļesņičenko made his international debut for Latvia in 1997, playing 47 international matches and scoring 5 goals. He did not participate at EURO 2004 and finished his international career in 2011.

=== Later career ===
After the retirement Koļesņičenko took office as the commercial director of his former club Skonto Riga. On 26 February 2012 Koļesņičenko was elected to become the chairman of the club, with Guntis Indriksons leaving the position. In March 2014 he appeared in a negative light, addressing rude comments towards the Latvian Football Federation via Twitter after Skonto were denied the necessary license for participation in the Latvian Higher League due to long-term debts. He was fined with 280 euros for breaching the code of ethics. The license was later granted after a successful process of appellation and Koļesņičenko deleted his tweets, saying that he would not apologize, though, as the comments had been expressed in a private capacity, not the functional one. His actions were strongly condemned by the LFF. In July 2014 Koļesņičenko resigned from the Skonto Riga president's office and was replaced by Igors Zaicevs. A few days after the resignation, Koļesņičenko's private company SIA SSA bought the Skonto Stadium for 13.8 million euros.

== Honours ==
=== Club ===
- Baltic Cup (1):

- 2001

- Champion of Latvia (9):

- 1997, 1998, 1999, 2000, 2001, 2002, 2003, 2006, 2007

=== Individual ===
- CIS Cup top goalscorer: 2000 (shared)
- Virsliga Top Scorer: 2000

== Career statistics ==
=== Club statistics ===
1996	Skonto-Metāls	Virsliga 1st level	27/1*
1997	Skonto Riga	Virsliga 1st level	12/3
1998	Skonto Riga	Virsliga 1st level	1/0
1999	Skonto Riga	Virsliga 1st level	25/13
2000	Skonto Riga	Virsliga 1st level	28/17
2001	Skonto Riga	Virsliga 1st level	28/8
2002	Skonto Riga	Virsliga 1st level	27/11
2003	Torpedo Moscow	Russian Premier League 1st level	7/0
2003	Skonto Riga	Virsliga 1st level	13/4
2004	Skonto Riga	Virsliga 1st level	10/1
2004	FC Moscow	Russian Premier League 1st level	1/0
2005	FK Venta	Virsliga 1st level	0/0
2006	FK Ventspils	Virsliga 1st level	18/3
2007	FK Ventspils	Virsliga 1st level	23/1
2008	FK Ventspils	Virsliga 1st level	23/4
2009	Inter Baku	Azerbaijan Premier League 1st level	9/1
2009	Skonto Riga	Virsliga 1st level	10/3
2010	Chornomorets Odesa	Ukrainian Premier League 1st level	7/0
2011	Skonto Riga	Virsliga 1st level	10/1

* – played games and goals

=== International goals ===
#	Date	Venue	Opponent	Score	Result	Competition
1.	3 July 2001	Daugava Stadium, Riga, Latvia	Estonia	3–1	Win	2001 Baltic Cup
2.	5 July 2001	Daugava Stadium, Riga, Latvia	Lithuania	4–1	Win	2001 Baltic Cup
3.	27 March 2002	Stade Alphonse Theis, Hesperange, Luxembourg	Luxembourg	0–3	Win	Friendly
4.	3 December 2004	Bahrain National Stadium, Riffa, Bahrain	Bahrain	2–2	Draw	Bahrain P.M. Cup
5.	15 October 2008	Skonto Stadions, Riga, Latvia	Israel	1–1	Draw	2010 FIFA WC Qual.
6.	14 November 2009	Estadio Tiburcio Carías Andino, Tegucigalpa, Honduras	Honduras	2–1	Lost	Friendly
Correct as of 7 October 2015

== Personal life ==
Vladimirs Koļesņičenko is married and has a child.
