= Mihails Miholaps =

Latvian-Russian footballer

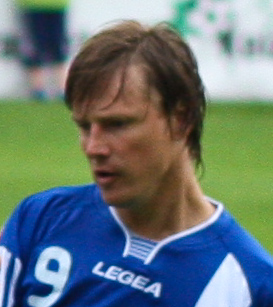
- Miholaps playing for JFK Olimps Rīga

Personal information
- Date of birth: 24 August 1974 (age 52)
- Place of birth: Kaliningrad, RSFSR, Soviet Union
- Height: 1.84 m (6 ft 0 in)
- Position: Forward

Senior career*
| Years | Team | Apps | (Gls) |
| 1994 | Vest Kaliningrad | 11 | (2) |
| 1995–1996 | Amstrig / Daugava Riga | 43 | (44) |
| 1997–2007 | Skonto Rīga | 216 | (155) |
| 2003 | → Alania Vladikavkaz (loan) | 13 | (4) |
| 2007–2009 | FC Shakhter | 37 | (12) |
| 2008 | → FK Riga (loan) | 12 | (6) |
| 2009–2010 | JFK Olimps Riga | 17 | (5) |
| Total | | 349 | (228) |

International career
| 1998–2005 | Latvia | 32 | (2) |

Managerial career
- 2010: Olimps/RFS (assistant)
- 2010–2011: Olimps/RFS
- 2011: Olimps/RFS (assistant)
- 2012–2015: Skonto Riga (assistant)
- 2016–2017: SK Babīte
- 2017: RFS (assistant)
- 2018–2019: Jelgava-2
- 2020: Valmiera (assistant)
- * Club domestic league appearances and goals

Mihails Miholaps (Russian: Михаи́л Вике́нтьевич Михола́п; born 24 August 1974) is a Latvian Russian professional football coach and a former player.

A former striker, he played 32 international matches and scored two goals for the Latvia national team. He debuted in 1998, and also played at the Euro 2004.

Miholaps started his career in Vest Kaliningrad, and played for Baltika Kaliningrad, Daugava Riga, Spartak-Alania Vladikavkaz, Skonto Riga, FC Shakhter, FK Riga and Olimps/RFS.

== Honours ==
- Latvian Higher League top goalscorer: 1996, 2001, 2002, 2006
- CIS Cup top goalscorer: 1999
