= Andrejs Rubins =

Latvian footballer (1978–2022)

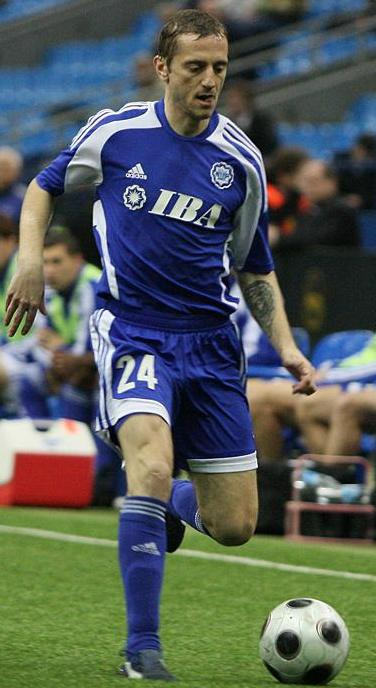
- Rubins playing for Inter Baku

Personal information
- Date of birth: 26 November 1978
- Place of birth: Riga, Latvian SSR, Soviet Union
- Date of death: 1 August 2022 (aged 43)
- Height: 1.74 m (5 ft 9 in)
- Position: Left midfielder

Youth career
- –1996: FK Auda

Senior career*
Years	Team	Apps	(Gls)
1996	FK Auda	0	(0)
1997	Östers	11	(0)
1998–2000	Skonto	67	(14)
2000–2003	Crystal Palace	31	(0)
2003	Spartak Moscow	0	(0)
2003–2004	Shinnik Yaroslavl	51	(4)
2005–2007	Spartak Moscow	5	(0)
2006	→ Shinnik Yaroslavl (loan)	13	(0)
2007	→ Liepājas Metalurgs (loan)	18	(1)
2008–2010	Inter Baku	49	(9)
2010–2011	Qarabağ	12	(0)
2011–2012	Simurq PFC	18	(1)
Total		278	(29)

International career
1998–2011	Latvia	117	(9)

Managerial career
- 2014–2016: FK Ogre (assistant)
- 2019: FK Auda
- 2022: Spartaks Jūrmala (assistant)
- * Club domestic league appearances and goals

Andrejs Rubins (26 November 1978 – 1 August 2022) was a Latvian professional footballer who played as a left midfielder. He was a member of the Latvia national team. After retiring as a player, Rubins worked as a football manager.

== Club career ==
Born in Riga, Rubins started his career in 1996 at FK Auda in the Latvian 2nd Division. The following year he moved to Sweden with Östers, where he made eleven league appearances, before moving back to Latvia in 1998 to play for Skonto Riga. He played there for the next three seasons, and managed to win three league titles in a row. He also won the Latvian Cup twice. All in all, over those three seasons he scored 14 goals in 67 league matches.

In 2000, Rubins moved to England, joining English Football League First Division club Crystal Palace. He made just 31 appearances in three seasons at the club, but still managed to impress, scoring twice in the League Cup against Leicester City and Liverpool.

In December 2002, Rubins moved to Russia, initially to play for Spartak Moscow in the Russian Premier League on a free transfer. However, three months later, without playing a game, he moved to Shinnik Yaroslavl, where he played 51 games in two seasons, scoring 4 times. In January 2005, Rubins signed a four-year contract with Spartak Moscow, who were then managed by Latvian manager Aleksandrs Starkovs. After struggling to settle, he made just five appearances, and the club sent him on loan back to Shinnik Yaroslavl in January 2006 for 12 months.

In June 2007, he was linked with another loan move, this time with English Football League Championship club Blackpool, but he eventually went on loan to the Latvian Higher League club Liepājas Metalurgs on 27 July for six months. He was released by Metalurgs together with his international team-mate Imants Bleidelis after half-season for unexplained reasons. Bleidelis retired from professional football then, but Rubins signed a contract with the Azerbaijan Premier League club Inter Baku in August 2008. He spent two successful seasons there, becoming a vital starting eleven player for the club, scoring nine goals in 49 league games. Rubins also managed to become the champion of Azerbaijan in the 2009–10 with Inter.

He started the 2010–11 season with another Azerbaijan Premier League club Qarabağ from Aghdam, joining on a two-year contract on a free transfer. Rubins suffered several injuries that caused limited game time, and he only managed to appear in 12 league games and was released at the end of the season. In 2011, he was signed by Azerbaijan Premier League club Simurq PFC. Rubins scored one goal in 18 matches for the club, and in July 2012 he was released.

Struggling with a long-term hip injury, Rubins announced his retirement from professional football on 13 March 2013, saying: "If I cannot play for 100%, that's not worth it."

== International career ==
After representing various Latvia youth national teams, Rubins made his debut for the Latvian national team in a friendly match against Tunisia on 10 November 1998. On 5 July 2001, he scored his first international goal in a Baltic Cup match against Lithuania, helping Latvia secure a 4–1 victory.

Rubins played a key role in Latvia's qualification for their first-ever UEFA European Championship at UEFA Euro 2004 qualifying. He started all ten of Latvia's qualifying matches. In November 2002, his free kick against San Marino deflected off an opposing player and resulted in the winning goal. Latvia subsequently secured qualification for the tournament by defeating Turkey 3–2 on aggregate in the play-offs.

In June 2004, Rubins represented Latvia at UEFA Euro 2004, held in Portugal. He appeared in all three of Latvia's group-stage matches against the Czech Republic, Germany, and the Netherlands. Latvia drew 0–0 with Germany but were eliminated in the group stage after finishing with one draw and two defeats.

On 14 October 2009, Rubins scored twice in a 2010 FIFA World Cup qualifying match against Moldova, helping Latvia secure a 3–2 victory. He made his final international appearance on 11 October 2011, in a UEFA Euro 2012 qualifying match against Croatia. Rubins represented Latvia at international level from 1998 to 2011.

== Coaching career ==
After his retirement Rubins started coaching children and youngsters in Ikšķile. Prior to the 2014 Latvian First League season Rubins was appointed the assistant manager of FK Ogre.

As of 2022 he was an assistant coach to FK Spartaks Jūrmala.

== Death ==
Rubins died on 1 August 2022. The Latvian Football Federation announced his death on 3 August.

== Career statistics ==
As of 26 September 2013

Appearances and goals by club, season and competition
Club	Season	League			National cup		League cup		Continental		Total	
Club	Season	Division	Apps	Goals	Apps	Goals	Apps	Goals	Apps	Goals	Apps	Goals
Crystal Palace	2000–01	Football League First Division	22	0	2	0	3	2	–		27	2
Crystal Palace	2001–02	Football League First Division	7	0	0	0	1	0	–		8	0
Crystal Palace	2002–03	Football League First Division	2	0	0	0	0	0	–		2	0
Crystal Palace	Total		31	0	2	0	4	2	0	0	37	2
Inter Baku	2008–09	Azerbaijan Premier League	19	6					0	0	19	6
Inter Baku	2009–10	Azerbaijan Premier League	30	3					2	0	32	3
Inter Baku	Total		49	9					2	0	51	9
Qarabağ	2010–11	Azerbaijan Premier League	12	0	1	0			4	0	17	0
Simurq	2011–12	Azerbaijan Premier League	18	1	1	0			-		19	1
Career total			110	10	4	0	4	2	6	0	124	12

== Honours ==
Skonto

- Virslīga: 1998, 1999, 2000
- Latvian Cup: 1998, 2000; runners-up 1999

Spartak Moscow

- Russian Premier League runners-up: 2005

Liepājas Metalurgs

- Virslīga runners-up: 2007
- Baltic League: 2007

Inter Baku

- Azerbaijan Premier League 2009–10; runners-up 2008–09

Latvia

- Baltic Cup: 2001, 2003

== See also ==
- List of men's footballers with 100 or more international caps
