= Zurab Menteshashvili =

Georgian footballer

Zurab Menteshashvili ზურაბ მენთეშაშვილი
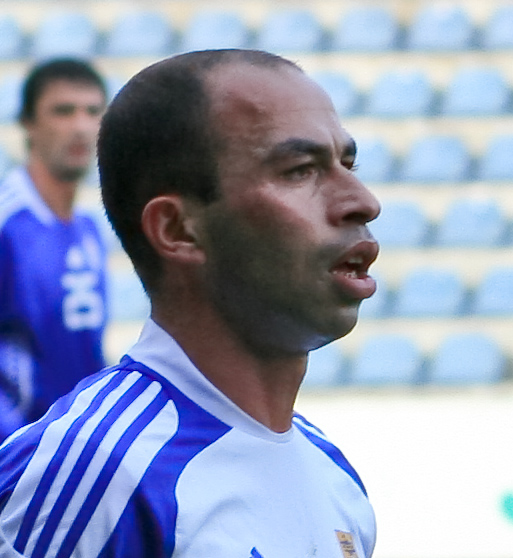

Personal information
- Date of birth: 30 January 1980 (age 46)
- Place of birth: Rustavi, Georgian SSR, Soviet Union
- Height: 1.76 m (5 ft 9 in)
- Position: Midfielder

Senior career*
Years	Team	Apps	(Gls)
1996–1998	Gorda Rustavi	15	(0)
1998–1999	FC WIT Georgia	14	(1)
1999–2002	Skonto FC	77	(11)
2003	Spartak-Alania Vladikavkaz	13	(0)
2003–2006	Skonto FC	68	(8)
2006	Shinnik Yaroslavl	15	(0)
2007–2009	FK Ventspils	54	(4)
2009–2010	Hapoel Tel Aviv	18	(0)
2010–2011	Hapoel Ashkelon	15	(0)
2011	Hapoel Ramat Gan	0	(0)
2011–2013	FC Zestaponi	30	(2)
2013	Metalurgi Rustavi	3	(0)
2013–2015	Saburtalo Tbilisi	14	(4)
2016	Norchi	2	(0)
2017	Locomotive Tbilisi	5	(0)

International career
2000–2010	Georgia	40	(1)
- * Club domestic league appearances and goals

Zurab Menteshashvili (Georgian: ზურაბ მენთეშაშვილი; born 30 January 1980) is a former football midfielder from Georgia.

== Club career ==
Menteshashvili previously played for FC Spartak Alania, FC Shinnik Yaroslavl in the Russian Premier League and FK Ventspils in Virsliga.

== Playing career ==
1996-97	(Georgia (country)) Gorda Rustavi	Umaglesi Liga 1st level	0/0
1997-98	(Georgia (country)) Gorda Rustavi	Umaglesi Liga 1st level	15/0
1998-99	(Georgia (country)) WIT Georgia Tbilisi	Umaglesi Liga 1st level	14/1
1999	(Latvia) Skonto Riga	Virsliga 1st level	17/1
2000	(Latvia) Skonto Riga	Virsliga 1st level	21/6
2001	(Latvia) Skonto Riga	Virsliga 1st level	21/2
2002	(Latvia) Skonto Riga	Virsliga 1st level	18/2
2003	(Russia) Alania Vladikavkaz	Premier League 1st level	13/0
	(Latvia) Skonto Riga	Virsliga 1st level	11/1
2004	(Latvia) Skonto Riga	Virsliga 1st level	25/2
2005	(Latvia) Skonto Riga	Virsliga 1st level	24/4
2006	(Latvia) Skonto Riga	Virsliga 1st level	8/1
	(Russia) Shinnik Yaroslavl	Premier League 1st level	15/0
2007	(Latvia) FK Ventspils	Virsliga 1st level	3/0

* - played games and goals

== Awards ==
- Champion of Latvia (8) - 1999, 2000, 2001, 2002, 2003, 2004, 2007, 2008.
- Israel State Cup (1) - 2010
- Israeli Premier League - 2010
