= Policijas FK =

Latvian football club

Policijas FK or FK Policija (later known as PFK Daugava) was a Latvian football club based in Riga that played in the Virslīga from 1999 to 2002.

== History ==
The football club of the Latvian police forces was founded in 1994. Until 1998 it played in the lower divisions of Latvian football as a completely amateur team. In 1998 Policijas FK for the first year played in 1. līga and won the tournament.

In 1999 Policijas FK coached by Georgijs Gusarenko debuted in Virslīga. The club's main star was veteran goalkeeper Raimonds Laizāns. Over 28 matches in 1999 Policijas FK scored 25 goals and succeeded 93 (even more than absolute league outsiders FK Rēzekne). This gave the club the 7th place in Virslīga of 8 teams. The club also suffered two dramatic losses against Skonto FC – 0:9 and 0:12.

For the 2000 season Policijas FK got several former Skonto FC players including goalkeeper Andrejs Pavlovs and former Latvia national football team player Vladimirs Babičevs. Another former Skonto (and Daugava Rīga) star Jurijs Ševļakovs took up the coaching position. Still Policijas FK couldn't make an impression in the league – another 7th-place finish. After the club which was in financial trouble was merged with another struggling Riga side – Daugava Rīga and was renamed to PFK Daugava. In the middle of the season Ševļakovs was replaced by Vladimirs Žuks. After the season Jurijs Popkovs took up the head coach position with the merged club.

The 2001 season proved to be the most successful in the history of the police football club – it finished 5th in the Latvian league and even had a relatively good scored-succeed goal balance – 38 against 39. Aleksands Sergejevs was the club's best goalscorer with 9 goals, followed by Edijs Daņilovs with 8 goals. Goalkeeper Pāvels Doroševs who joined the club in the middle of the season was also a huge contributor to the club's success.

The 2002 season when the club ran into major financial difficulties proved to be the last one for the club. It finished in the 6th place in Virslīga but after the season the club went bankrupt.

== Notable players ==
Former players for Policijas FK included football agent Romans Bezzubovs, who was killed in 2021.
