= Viktors Dobrecovs =

Latvian footballer and manager

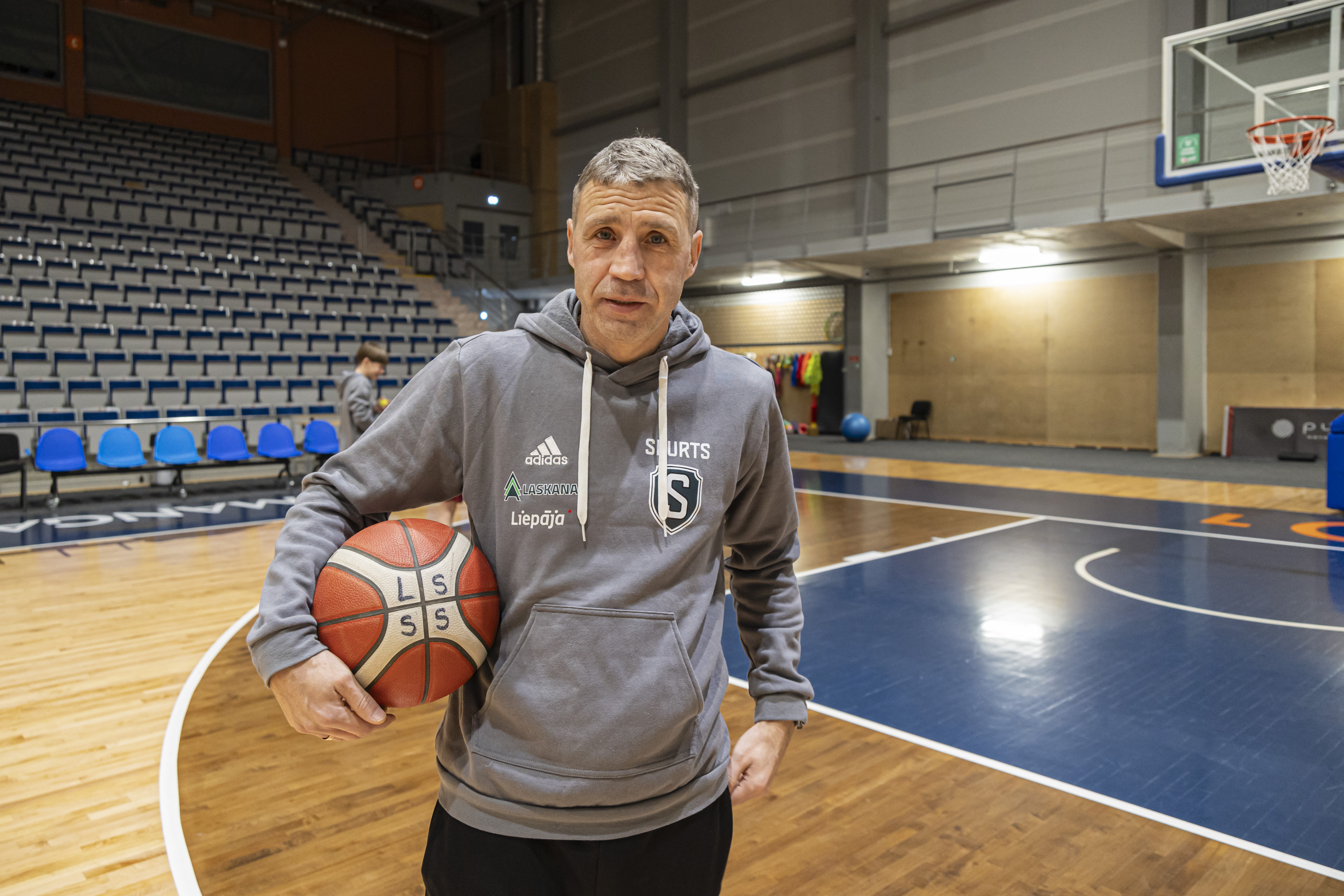

Personal information
- Full name: Viktors Dobrecovs
- Date of birth: 9 January 1977 (age 49)
- Place of birth: Liepāja, Latvian SSR, Soviet Union
- Height: 1.76 m (5 ft 9 1/2 in)
- Position: Striker

Senior career*
Years	Team	Apps	(Gls)
1993	Olimpija Liepāja	6	(0)
1994	FK Liepāja	15	(1)
1995	DAG Liepāja	17	(5)
1996	Baltika Liepāja	25	(7)
1997–2005	Liepājas Metalurgs	230	(172)
2006–2007	FC TVMK Tallinn	29	(17)
2007–2008	Daugava Daugavpils	18	(0)
2008–2009	Liepājas Metalurgs (player-coach)	16	(4)

International career
1998–2005	Latvia	18	(0)

Managerial career
- 2010–2012: Liepājas Metalurgs-2 (assistant)
- 2013: Liepājas Metalurgs (assistant)
- 2014–2016: FK Liepāja
- 2017–2018: Grobiņas SC
- 2019: FK Atlantas
- * Club domestic league appearances and goals

Viktors Dobrecovs (born 9 January 1977) is a football manager and former Latvian football striker.

== Honours ==
- Virsliga Top Scorer (4):

- 1998, 1999, 2003, 2005
