= Andrejs Piedels =

Latvian footballer and coach

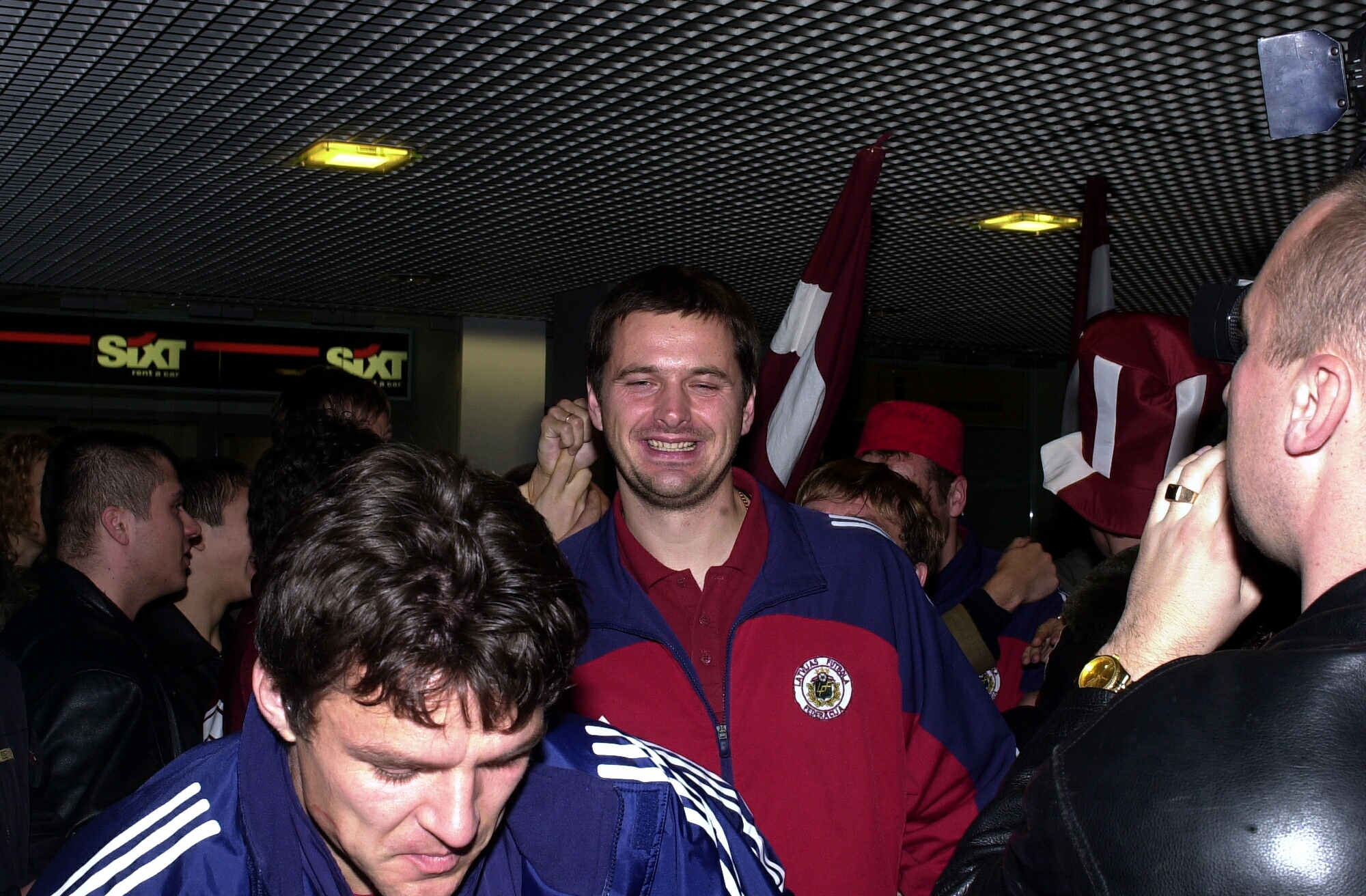

Personal information
- Full name: Andrejs Piedels
- Date of birth: 17 September 1970 (age 56)
- Place of birth: Jēkabpils, Latvian SSR, Soviet Union (now Republic of Latvia)
- Height: 1.93 m (6 ft 4 in)
- Position: Goalkeeper

Senior career*
Years	Team	Apps	(Gls)
1992	Daugava Rīga	0	(0)
1993	Pārdaugava Rīga	0	(0)
1994	DAG Rīga	16	(0)
1995	Amstrig Rīga	26	(5)
1996–1997	Daugava Rīga	43	(0)
1998–2007	Skonto Rīga	171	(0)
2008	Jūrmala	27	(0)
2009	Daugava Riga	5	(0)
2010	Olimps/RFS	0	(0)
Total		288	(5)

International career
1998–2005	Latvia	14	(0)

Managerial career
- 2010–2011: Olimps/RFS (assistant)
- 2012–2014: Skonto Rīga (goalkeeper coach)
- 2013: Latvia U-21 (goalkeeper coach)
- 2013–2018: Latvia (goalkeeper coach)
- 2014–2017: Jelgava (goalkeeper coach)
- 2017–2020: Riga (goalkeeper coach)
- * Club domestic league appearances and goals

Andrejs Piedels (born 17 September 1970) is a former Latvian football goalkeeper.

== Career ==
He played for Pārdaugava, Daugava, Amstrig, DAG, Skonto FC, FK Jūrmala, FK Daugava Riga and Olimps/RFS.

He collected 14 caps for the Latvia national football team and participated in Euro 2004.
