= FK Rīga =

Defunct Latvian football club

- Full name: Futbola klubs "Rīga"
- Short name: Rīga
- Founded: 1999
- Dissolved: 2008
- Ground: Latvijas Universitātes Stadions, Riga, Latvia
- Capacity: 5000
- League: Virslīga
- 2008: Virslīga, 6th
Home colours

FK Rīga was a Latvian football club based in Riga. They played in the Virslīga, the top division in Latvian football. They played their home games at Latvijas Universitātes Stadions. In 1999, its first year of existence, the club won the Latvian Cup, beating Skonto at the final. The club also played in the UEFA Cup. In 2007, FK Rīga achieved its best result in Virslīga so far by finishing 3rd as the highest placed club from Riga.

FK Rīga played in the 2008 Intertoto Cup. Their first round opponents were Fylkir from suburban Árbær in the eastern part of Reykjavík. In the second round. they played Irish club Bohemian and, as against Fylkir, the home leg was played in the city of Liepāja, approximately 217 kilometres from Riga.

At the end of the 2007–08 season the club went bankrupt due to its financial problems and the football school that was in the club's system joined FK Olimps/ASK (later known as RFS/Olimps).

== Honours ==
- Latvian Cup: (1)

1999

== European performances ==
- 1Q = First Qualifying Round
- 1R = First Round

Season	Cup	Round	Country	Club	Score
1999	UEFA Cup	1R	(Sweden)	Helsingborg	0–0, 0–5
2008	Intertoto Cup	1R	(Iceland)	Fylkir	1–2, 2–0
		2R	(Republic of Ireland)	Bohemian	1–0, 1–2
		3R	(Sweden)	Elfsborg	0–1, 0–0

== Managers ==
- (Latvia) Jānis Gilis (1999)
- (Latvia) Georgijs Gusarenko (2000–2001)
- (Latvia) Viktors Ņesterenko (2001–2002)
- (Latvia) Aleksandrs Dorofejevs (2002)
- (Latvia) Georgijs Gusarenko (2002)
- (Latvia) Viktors Ņesterenko (2002–2003)
- (England) Paul Ashworth (2004)
- (Latvia) Ēriks Grigjans (2005–2006)
- (Latvia) Sergejs Semjonovs (2006–2007)
- (Russia) Genādijs Morozovs (2008)
- (Russia) Anatolijs Šeļests (2008)
