= 2014 Virsligas Winter Cup =

Latvian football competition

Ziemas Kauss

Tournament details
- Country: Latvia
- Dates: 20 January 2014 – 24 February 2014
- Teams: 10

Final positions
- Champions: Skonto FC
- Runner-up: FK Jelgava

Tournament statistics
- Matches played: 24
- Goals scored: 100 (4.17 per match)
- Top goal scorer(s): 3 players (3 goals)

2014 Virsligas Winter Cup was the second edition of Virsligas Winter Cup. FC Daugava were the defending champions. They eventually finished in third place, while Skonto FC became the champions.

== Group stage ==
=== Group A ===
Team	Pld	W	D	L	GF	GA	GD	Pts
Jelgava	4	3	0	1	13	4	+9	9
Daugava (Rīga)	4	2	1	1	11	6	+5	7
Gulbene	4	1	2	1	8	8	+0	5
Daugava (Daugavpils)	4	1	1	2	4	12	-8	4
Jūrmala*	4	1	0	3	8	14	-6	3

- "Jurmala" was disqualified due to repeated violations of the regulations of Major League Winter Cup 2014.

	JEL	DAD	DAR	GUL	JŪR
Jelgava	–	1–2			7–0
Daugava (Daugavpils)		—	1–3		0–7
Daugava (Rīga)	1–2		—	3–3	
Gulbene	1–3	1–1		—	
Jūrmala			0–4	1–3	—

20 January 2014 Group stage	Jelgava	7–0	Jūrmala	Skonto
13:30 EET (UTC+02)	Žuļevs 15', 39'; Pētersons 18'; Malašenoks 22'; Diakvinishvili 30'; Vladislavs Kozlovs 63', 87'	Report (in Latvian)		Stadium: Skonto Hall; Attendance: 105; Referee: V. Direktorenko

20 January 2014 Group stage	Daugava (Rīga)	3–3	Gulbene	Skonto
11:30 EET (UTC+02)	Savėnas 24'; Blanks 36'; Lukšys 75'	Report (in Latvian)	Semjonovs 73'; Mišins 77', 81'	Stadium: Skonto Hall; Attendance: 70; Referee: J.Vasjukovs

27 January 2014 Group stage	Daugava (Daugavpils)	1–1	Gulbene	Skonto
11:30 EET (UTC+02)	Dzelzkalējs 85'	Report (in Latvian)	Ševeļovs 90+2'	Stadium: Skonto Hall; Attendance: 50; Referee: M Ķere

27 January 2014 Group stage	Jūrmala	0–4	Daugava (Rīga)	Skonto
13:30 EET (UTC+02)		Report (in Latvian)	Kļuškins 2'; Savenas 9' (pen.), 30'; Lukšys 85'	Stadium: Skonto Hall; Attendance: 50; Referee: Vitālijs Spasjonņikovs

3 February 2014 Group stage	Daugava (Daugavpils)	0–7	Jūrmala	Skonto
11:30 EET (UTC+02)		Report (in Latvian)	Gissi 7', 38'; Trecarichi 40'; Montalvo 45+1'; Abot 71', 75'; Ulimbaševs 88'	Stadium: Skonto Hall; Attendance: 107; Referee: Dmitrijs Naļivaiko

3 February 2014 Group stage	Daugava (Rīga)	1–2	Jelgava	Skonto
13:30 EET (UTC+02)	Kļuškins 19'	Report (in Latvian)	Daņilovs 84'; Kozlovs 86'	Stadium: Skonto Hall; Attendance: 105; Referee: Vadims Diektorenko

10 February 2014 Group stage	Jelgava	1–2	Daugava (Daugavpils)	Skonto
11:30 EET (UTC+02)	Malašenoks 40'	Report (in Latvian)	Ibe 13'; Kuplovs-Oginskis 23' (pen.)	Stadium: Skonto Hall; Attendance: 70; Referee: Jevģenijs Vasjukovs

10 February 2014 Group stage	Jūrmala	1–3	Gulbene	Skonto
13:30 EET (UTC+02)	Trecarichi 37'	Report (in Latvian)	Goto 52'; Semjonovs 65', 77'	Stadium: Skonto Hall; Attendance: 70; Referee: Dmitrijs Nalivaiko

17 February 2014 Group stage	Gulbene	1–3	Jelgava	Skonto
11:30 EET (UTC+02)	Dzelzkalējs 36'	Report (in Latvian)	Pētersons 10'; Freimanis 84'; Jaudzems 86'	Stadium: Skonto Hall; Attendance: 75; Referee: : Ģirts Sarma

17 February 2014 Group stage	Daugava (Daugavpils)	1–3	FK Daugava (2003)	Skonto
11:30 EET (UTC+02)	Kokins 30'	Report (in Latvian)	Apiņš 7'; Blanks 84'; Kārkliņš 27'	Stadium: Skonto Hall; Attendance: 80; Referee: : Aleksandrs Anufrijevs

=== Group B ===
Team	Pld	W	D	L	GF	GA	GD	Pts
Skonto	4	4	0	0	10	2	+8	12
Spartaks	4	2	1	1	5	4	+1	7
Daugavpils	4	1	0	3	6	6	+0	3
METTA/LU	4	0	0	4	1	14	-13	0
Ventspils*	4	2	1	1	6	2	+4	7

- Despite the fact that "Ventspils" won 2nd place in the group, the club refused further participation in the tournament due to travel to the training camp in Turkey.

	VEN	SKO	MET	SPA	DAU
Ventspils	—			1–1	
Skonto	1–0	—			2–1
METTA/LU	0–3	0-4	—	0–2	
Spartaks		1–3		—	1–0
Daugavpils	0–2		5–1		—

21 January 2014 Group stage	|METTA/LU	0–3	Ventspils	Skonto
11:30 EET (UTC+02)		Report (in Latvian)	Paulius 10'; Ignatāns 41', 45+1'	Stadium: Skonto Hall; Attendance: 50; Referee: A.Anufrijevs

21 January 2014 Group stage	Spartaks	1–0	Daugavpils	Skonto
13:30 EET (UTC+02)	Punculs 84'	Report (in Latvian)		Stadium: Skonto Hall; Attendance: 100; Referee: : A.Treimanis

28 January 2014 Group stage	METTA/LU	0–2	Spartaks	Skonto
11:30 EET (UTC+02)		Report (in Latvian)	Kulmanakovs 13'; Punculs 80' (pen.)	Stadium: Skonto Hall; Attendance: 100; Referee: Aleksandrs Anufrijevs

28 January 2014 Group stage	Skonto	1–0	Ventspils	Skonto
13:30 EET (UTC+02)	Karašausks 71'	Report (in Latvian)		Stadium: Skonto Hall; Attendance: 120; Referee: Ivars Caune

4 February 2014 Group stage	Skonto	2–1	Daugavpils	Skonto
11:30 EET (UTC+02)	Karašausks 90'; Laizāns 90+3' (pen.)	Report (in Latvian)	Atamaņukovs 53'	Stadium: Skonto Hall; Attendance: 70; Referee: Mareks Ķere

4 February 2014 Group stage	Ventspils	1–1	Spartaks	Skonto
13:30 EET (UTC+02)	Ignatāns 9'	Report (in Latvian)	Kozlovs 34'	Stadium: Skonto Hall; Attendance: 50; Referee: Andris Treimanis

11 February 2014 Group stage	METTA/LU	0–4	Skonto	Skonto
11:30 EET (UTC+02)		Report (in Latvian)	Šabala 12', 59'; Savčenkovs 48'; Gutkovskis 64'	Stadium: Skonto Hall; Attendance: 110; Referee: Andris Treimanis

11 February 2014 Group stage	Daugavpils	0–2	Ventspils	Skonto
13:30 EET (UTC+02)		Report (in Latvian)	Žigajevs 28'; Yanchuk 59'	Stadium: Skonto Hall; Attendance: 80; Referee: Vadims Direktorenko

18 February 2014 Group stage	Spartaks	1–3	Skonto	Skonto
11:30 EET (UTC+02)	Krivošeja 83'	Report (in Latvian)	Šabala 38'; Ivanovs 62'; Laizāns 87' (pen.)	Stadium: Skonto Hall; Attendance: 100; Referee: Mareks Ķere

18 February 2014 Group stage	Daugavpils	5–1	METTA/LU	Skonto
13:30 EET (UTC+02)	Halimons 27' (pen.); Nakano 35'; Riževskis 55'; Truņins 65', 90+1'	Report (in Latvian)	Hasanalijevs 19'	Stadium: Skonto Hall; Attendance: 40; Referee: Jevģenijs Vasjukovs

== Knockout places ==
=== Seventh place ===
23 February 2014	Daugava (Daugavpils)	7–0	METTA/LU	Skonto
14:30 EET (UTC+02)	Kuplovs-Oginskis 3'; Solovjovs 10'; Jaliashvili 45+1', 62' (pen.); Grauze 78', 87'; Kozlov 89'	Report (in Latvian)		Stadium: Skonto Hall; Attendance: 60; Referee: Ģirts Sarma

=== Fifth place ===
23 February 2014	Gulbene	1–1 (4-5 p)	Daugavpils	Skonto
16:30 EET (UTC+02)	Semjonovs 63'	Report (in Latvian)	Riževskis 50'	Stadium: Skonto Hall; Attendance: 40; Referee: Raitis Zamzurs

=== Third place ===
24 February 2014	Daugava (Rīga)	2–1	Spartaks	Skonto
11:30 EET (UTC+02)	Savenas 5'; Kārkliņš 13'	Report (in Latvian)	Punculs 39'	Stadium: Skonto Hall; Attendance: 80; Referee: Dmitrijs Bogdanovs

=== Final ===
24 February 2014	Jelgava	2–3	Skonto	Skonto
13:30 EET (UTC+02)	Bespalovs 21', 45'	Report (in Latvian)	Laizāns 37' (pen.); Appiah 48'; Osipovs 78'	Stadium: Skonto Hall; Attendance: 100; Referee: Mārtiņš Veģeris
