= 2016 Virsligas Winter Cup =

Football competition held in Latvia

2016 Virslīgas Ziemas kausa
Tournament details
- Country: Latvia
- Teams: 8

Final positions
- Champions: FK Liepāja
- Runner-up: Ventspils

Tournament statistics
- Matches played: 20
- Goals scored: 52 (2.6 per match)

The 2016 Virsligas Winter Cup was the league cup's fourth season. It began on 18 January 2015. Skonto were the defending champion.

== Group stage ==
According to the format, the top two teams from each group advanced to the knockout stage. The third placed teams played each other to determine two more teams to join them.

=== Group A ===
Pos	Team	Pld	W	D	L	GF	GA	GD	Pts	Qualification
1	FK Jelgava (Q)	3	2	1	0	8	2	+6	7	Knockout stage
2	Skonto (Q)	3	2	0	1	6	3	+3	6	Knockout stage
3	Spartaks Jūrmala (Q)	3	0	2	1	1	3	−2	2	Position play–off
4	METTA/LU (Q)	3	0	1	2	1	8	−7	1	Position play–off

Updated to match(es) played on 18 January 2016. Source: soccerstand.com
Rules for classification: 1) points; 2) goal difference; 3) number of goals scored; 4) head-to-head points; 5) head-to-head goal difference; 6) goals scored in head-to-head
(Q) Qualified for the phase indicated

18 January 2016	Skonto	2–0	Spartaks Jūrmala	Riga
13:15	Karašausks 37' (pen.); Punculs 50' (yellow card) 58'	Report (in Latvian)	Avdejevs (yellow card) 27'; Bespalovs (yellow card) 52'; Spon 54'	Stadium: Skonto Hall; Attendance: 100; Referee: Andris Treimanis

19 January 2016	METTA/LU	0–5	FK Jelgava	Riga
13:15	Novgorodskis (yellow card) 75'	Report (in Latvian)	Kļuškins 12', 21' (yellow card) 21' ? 57'; Smirnovs 69'; Eriba 74'	Stadium: Skonto Hall; Attendance: 50; Referee: Aleksandrs Anufrijevs

25 January 2016	Skonto	2–0	METTA/LU	Riga
13:15	Jermolajevs 6'; Grīnbergs 70'	Report (in Latvian)	Bagdasarjans (yellow card) 5'	Stadium: Skonto Hall; Attendance: 90; Referee: Mareks Ķere

26 January 2016	FK Jelgava	0–0	Spartaks Jūrmala	Riga
13:15	Abdoulaye Diallo (yellow card) 54' (yellow card) 55' (yellow-red card)	Report (in Latvian)	Kozlovs (yellow card) 9' (yellow card) 55' (yellow-red card); Kozeka (yellow card) 42'; Bulvītis (yellow card) 45'	Stadium: Skonto Hall; Attendance: 65; Referee: Ivars Caune

1 February 2016	FK Jelgava	3–2	Skonto	Riga
13:15	Silich 12'; Kovaļovs 44' (pen.), 59'; Smirnovs (yellow card) 81'; Eriba (yellow card) 90'	Report (in Latvian)	Kozlovs (yellow card) 15'; Japiashvili (yellow card) 43'; Ivanovs 47'; Isajevs (yellow card) 50'; Sukhomlynov (yellow card) 58'; Gutkovskis 82' (pen.)	Stadium: Skonto Hall; Attendance: 150; Referee: Jevgenijs Vasjukovs

2 February 2016	Spartaks Jūrmala	1–1	METTA/LU	Riga
13:15	Bespalovs 53' (pen.)	Report (in Latvian)	Šibass (yellow card) 40'; Ošs (yellow card) 52'; Kalniņš (yellow card) 57'; Emsis (yellow card) 60'; Vardanjans 90+1'; Stuglis (yellow card) 90+2'	Stadium: Skonto Hall; Attendance: 60; Referee: Andris Utinans

=== Group B ===
Pos	Team	Pld	W	D	L	GF	GA	GD	Pts	Qualification
1	Liepāja (Q)	3	3	0	0	5	0	+5	9	Knockout stage
2	Ventspils (Q)	3	2	0	1	5	3	+2	6	Knockout stage
3	FC Caramba/Dinamo (Q)	3	1	0	2	5	5	0	3	Position play–off
4	BFC Daugavpils (Q)	3	0	0	3	2	9	−7	0	Position play–off

Updated to match(es) played on 19 January 2016. Source: soccerstand.com
Rules for classification: 1) points; 2) goal difference; 3) number of goals scored; 4) head-to-head points; 5) head-to-head goal difference; 6) goals scored in head-to-head
(Q) Qualified for the phase indicated

20 January 2016	Liepāja	2–0	FC Caramba/Dinamo	Riga
13:15	Afanasjevs 29', 42'; Dobrecovs (yellow card) 40'; Hvoinckis (yellow card) 70'	Report (in Latvian)	Blanks (yellow card) 56'; Daņilovs (yellow card) 90'	Stadium: Skonto Hall; Attendance: 120; Referee: Vadims Direktorenko

21 January 2016	BFC Daugavpils	1–3	Ventspils	Riga
13:15	Sokolovs 23' (pen.); Dobratuļins (yellow card) 42'; Fjodorovs (yellow card) 75' (yellow-red card)	Report (in Latvian)	Karlsons 25'; Žigajevs 40' ? 58'	Stadium: Skonto Hall; Attendance: 90; Referee: Jevgenijs Vasjukovs

27 January 2016	Liepāja	1–0	BFC Daugavpils	Riga
13:15	Mickevičs 58'	Report (in Latvian)	Ivanovs (yellow card) 75'; Davidovs (yellow card) 80'	Stadium: Skonto Hall; Attendance: 80; Referee: Dmitrijs Nalivaiko

28 January 2016	Ventspils	2–0	FC Caramba/Dinamo	Riga
13:15	Koļesovs (yellow card) 9'; Žigajevs 27'; Svārups 44'	Report (in Latvian)	Daņilovs (yellow card) 26'; Flaksis (yellow card) 33'	Stadium: Skonto Hall; Attendance: 110; Referee: Edgars Maļcevs

3 February 2016	Ventspils	0–2	Liepāja	Riga
13:15	Krjauklis (yellow card) 41'	Report (in Latvian)	Ikaunieks 38' (yellow card) 61'; Kamešs (yellow card) 78'; Kurtišs 86'	Stadium: Skonto Hall; Attendance: 100; Referee: Aleksandrs Anufrijevs

4 February 2016	FC Caramba/Dinamo	5–1	BFC Daugavpils	Riga
13:15	Daņilovs 26' (pen.), 39'; Savaļnieks 51', 70'; Šadčins 61' ? (yellow card) ?'; Naruševičs (yellow card) ?'	Report (in Latvian)	Ignatāns 83' (pen.); Deružinskis (yellow card) ?'; Dobratuļins (yellow card) ?'	Stadium: Skonto Hall; Attendance: 100; Referee: Andris Treimanis

== Position play–off ==
=== Fifth–Eighth place ===
8 February 2016	Spartaks Jūrmala	1–0	BFC Daugavpils	Riga
13:15	Kozeka 54'	Report (in Latvian)		Stadium: Skonto Hall

9 February 2016	Caramba/Dinamo	3–2	METTA/LU	Riga
13:15	Saitō 61'; Savaļnieks 71'; Halvitovs 80'	Report (in Latvian)	Kalniņš 4'; Vardanjans 6' (pen.)	Stadium: Skonto Hall

=== Seventh–Eighth place ===
16 February 2016	BFC Daugavpils	1–0	METTA/LU	Riga
13:15	Žaldovskis 80'	Report (in Latvian)		Stadium: Skonto Hall

=== Fifth–Sixth place ===
17 February 2016	Caramba/Dinamo	1–1 (6–5 p)	Spartaks Jūrmala	Riga
13:15	Šadčins 57'	Report (in Latvian)	Dos Santos 35'	Stadium: Skonto Hall

== Knockout stage ==
=== Semi-finals ===
10 February 2016	Jelgava	0–1	Ventspils	Riga
13:15		Report (in Latvian)	Karlsons 62'	Stadium: Skonto Hall

11 February 2016	Liepāja	1–0	Skonto	Riga
13:15	Kļava 5'	Report (in Latvian)		Stadium: Skonto Hall

=== Third place play-off ===
18 February 2016	Jelgava	6–1	Skonto	Riga
13:15	Kļuškins 24'; Kovaļovs 32' (pen.); Nakano 39'; Silich 60'; Kauber 82'; Redjko 88'	Report (in Latvian)	Gutkovskis 49'	Stadium: Skonto Hall

== Final ==
20 February 2016	FK Liepāja	1–0	Ventspils	Riga
13:15	Ikaunieks 34' (pen.)			Stadium: Skonto Hall
