= 2015 Virsligas Winter Cup =

Latvian football competition

2015 Virslīgas Ziemas kausa
Tournament details
- Country: Latvia
- Teams: 10

Final positions
- Champions: Skonto FC
- Runner-up: FK Liepāja

Tournament statistics
- Matches played: 17
- Goals scored: 74 (4.35 per match)

The 2015 Virsligas Winter Cup was the league cup's third season. It began on 19 January 2015. Skonto FC, the defending champion, successfully retained their title.

== Group stage ==
The top two teams from each group advanced to the knockout stage. The third placed teams played each other to determine two more teams that would advance to the knockout stage.

=== Group A ===
Pos	Team	Pld	W	D	L	GF	GA	GD	Pts	Qualification
1	Skonto	3	3	0	0	16	1	+15	9	Knockout stage
2	Ventspils	3	2	0	1	7	6	+1	6	Knockout stage
3	Daugavpils	3	1	0	2	3	10	−7	3	Third place play–off
4	METTA/LU	3	0	0	3	4	13	−9	0	
5	FK Daugava*	0	0	0	0	0	0	0	0	

Updated to match(es) played on 19 January 2015. Source: soccerstand.com
Rules for classification: 1) points; 2) goal difference; 3) number of goals scored; 4) head-to-head points; 5) head-to-head goal difference; 6) goals scored in head-to-head
- FK Daugava Riga is removed from the Winter Cup 2015

19 January 2015	Skonto	2–0	FK Daugava	Riga
13:15	Kozlovs 19'; Osipovs (yellow card) 36'; Morozs (yellow card) 56'; Karašausks 81' (pen.)	Report (in Latvian)	Kučys (yellow card) 42'; Pilotas (yellow card) 81'	Stadium: Skonto Hall; Attendance: 75; Referee: Andris Treimanis

20 January 2015	Daugavpils	0–2	Ventspils	Riga
13:15	Radevičs (yellow card) 17'; Kaļiņins (yellow card) 87'	Report (in Latvian)	Žigajevs 15'; Karlsons 34'; Ignatāns (yellow card) 76'	Stadium: Skonto Hall; Attendance: 65; Referee: Jevgēnijs Vasjukovs

26 January 2015	Skonto	6–0	Daugavpils	Riga
13:15	Karašausks 23', 84' (pen.); Jermolajevs 38'; Pallo 57'; Višņakovs 58'; Rode (yellow card) 60'; Osipovs (yellow card) 66' (goal) 69'	Report (in Latvian)	Dobratuļins (yellow card) 38'; Tarasovs (yellow card) 77'; Ivanovs (yellow card) 83'	Stadium: Skonto Hall; Attendance: 75; Referee: Mareks Ķere

27 January 2015	METTA/LU	1–5	Ventspils	Riga
13:15	Loginovs 60'; Kalniņš (yellow card) 60'	Report (in Latvian)	Siņeļņikovs 23'; Karlsons 29'; Žigajevs 46'; Kurakins (yellow card) 55'; Mordatenko 56'; Saad (yellow card) 65'; Ulimbaševs (yellow card) 70'; Mujeci 90'	Stadium: Skonto Hall; Attendance: 60; Referee: Dmitrijs Nalivaiko

3 February 2015	Ventspils	0–5	Skonto	Riga
13:15	Siņeļņikovs (yellow card) 15'; Barinovs (yellow card) 25'; Rugins (yellow card) 32' (yellow card) 82' (yellow-red card); Jemeļins (yellow card) 64' (yellow card) 65' (yellow-red card)	Report (in Latvian)	Višņakovs 32'; Pallo (yellow card) 33'; Karašausks 56', 64' (pen.), 71'; Gabovs 59'; Riherts (yellow card) 85'	Stadium: Skonto Hall; Attendance: 120; Referee: Aleksandrs Anufrijevs

9 February 2015	METTA/LU	1–5	Skonto	Riga
13:15	Loginovs 22'; Petrenko (yellow card) 36'; Ostrovskis (yellow card) 82'; Giļničs (yellow card) 87'; Daugavietis (yellow card) 90'	Report (in Latvian)	Jermolajevs 17'; Gutkovskis 20'; Karašausks 56' (pen.), 87' (pen.); Gabovs 60'; Rode (yellow card) 66'	Stadium: Skonto Hall; Attendance: 120; Referee: Mareks Ķere

16 February 2015	METTA/LU	2–3	Daugavpils	Riga
13:15	Loginovs 19'; Priedēns 24'; Rožkovskis (yellow card) 43'; Giļničs (yellow card) 54'	Report (in Latvian)	not known 12 50'; Litvinskis 77' not known 5 (yellow card) 31'; Lukyanuk (yellow card) 42'	Stadium: Skonto Hall; Attendance: 40; Referee: Andris Treimanis

=== Group B ===
Pos	Team	Pld	W	D	L	GF	GA	GD	Pts	Qualification
1	Liepāja	3	2	1	0	12	2	+10	7	Knockout stage
2	Jelgava	3	1	2	0	9	5	+4	5	Knockout stage
3	Rēzeknes BJSS	3	1	0	2	3	12	−9	3	Third place play–off
4	Valmiera Glass FK/BSS	3	0	1	2	4	9	−5	1	
5	Gulbene	0	0	0	0	0	0	0	0	

Updated to match(es) played on 19 January 2015. Source: soccerstand.com
Rules for classification: 1) points; 2) goal difference; 3) number of goals scored; 4) head-to-head points; 5) head-to-head goal difference; 6) goals scored in head-to-head

21 January 2015	Gulbene	ANL	Valmiera Glass FK/BSS	Riga
13:15	Savinovs (yellow card) 55'; Kurma 62'	Report (in Latvian)	Savaļnieks 11', 43', 86'; Lācis (yellow card) 28'	Stadium: Skonto Hall; Attendance: 50; Referee: Vadims Direktorenko

22 January 2015	Liepāja	1–1	Jelgava	Riga
13:15	Grebis 30'	Report (in Latvian)	Savčenkovs 75'	Stadium: Skonto Hall; Attendance: 70; Referee: Aleksandrs Anufrijevs

28 January 2015	Gulbene	ANL	Liepāja	Riga
13:15	Medeckis 6'	Report (in Latvian)	Gucs 23'; Jurkovskis 31', 39'; Kupčs 41', 47'; Dobrecovs 87'	Stadium: Skonto Hall; Attendance: 50; Referee: Vitālijs Spasjoņņikovs

29 January 2015	Jelgava	5–1	Rēzeknes BJSS	Riga
13:15	Eriba 32'; Freimanis 39'; Ošs 45+1'; Dresmanis (yellow card) 67' (goal) 76'; M. Ošs 89'	Report (in Latvian)	Silagailis 84'; Smirnovs (yellow card) 68'	Stadium: Skonto Hall; Attendance: 65; Referee: Edgars Maļcevs

4 February 2015	Liepāja	4–1	Valmiera Glass FK/BSS	Riga
13:15	Gucs 13'; Šadčins 23'; Ikaunieks 66'; Šlampe (yellow card) 72'; Hmizs 90+1' (pen.)	Report (in Latvian)	Siksalietis 16'; Dubro (yellow card) 90'	Stadium: Skonto Hall; Attendance: 45; Referee: Jevģēnijs Vasjukovs

5 February 2015	Rēzeknes BJSS	ANL	Gulbene	Riga
13:15	Ivanovs 14'; Silovs 50'; Gajevskis (yellow card) 71'; Ščavinskis 79'	Report (in Latvian)	Kurma 21' (pen.); Fujikawa 30', 58', 63'; Aguls 81' (o.g.)	Stadium: Skonto Hall; Attendance: 30; Referee: Andris Treimanis

11 February 2015	Jelgava	ANL	Gulbene	Riga
13:15	Lazdiņš (yellow card) 15'; Eriba 18', 58'; Bogdaškins (yellow card) 31'; Freimanis (yellow card) 45'; Łatka (yellow card) 55'; Jaudzems 86'; Malašenoks (yellow card) 87'; Redjko 88'	Report (in Latvian)	Budilovs (yellow card) 14'; Fujikawa 38'; Telešs (yellow card) 55'; Pavļučenko (yellow card) 69'; Kurma 90'	Stadium: Skonto Hall; Attendance: 65; Referee: Dmitrijs Nalivaiko

12 February 2015	Valmiera Glass FK/BSS	0–2	Rēzeknes BJSS	Riga
13:15			Vavilov 41'; Silagailis 63'	Stadium: Skonto Hall

17 February 2015	Jelgava	3–3	Valmiera Glass FK/BSS	Riga
13:15	Bogdaškins 27'; Diallo (yellow card) 60'; Jaudzems 79' (yellow card) 80'; Malašenoks 86'	Report (in Latvian)	Savaļnieks 20', 66'; Apsītis (yellow card) 58'; Bankavs (yellow card) 63'; Ērglis 80'; Lācis (yellow card) 80'	Stadium: Skonto Hall; Attendance: 60; Referee: Aleksandrs Anufrijevs

18 February 2015	Rēzeknes BJSS	0–7	Liepāja	Riga
13:15	Ježkovs (yellow card) 15'; Brīvers (yellow card) 69'	Report (in Latvian)	Ikaunieks 3'; Šadčins 20', 28'; Gucs 38', 51'; Torres 62'; Dobrecovs 82'; Kārkliņš (yellow card) 44'	Stadium: Skonto Hall; Attendance: 85; Referee: Mareks Ķere

== Additional Games ==
2 February 2015	BFC Daugavpils	2–0	Jelgava	Riga
13:15	Ryzhevski 21'; Pegou 44'			Stadium: Skonto Hall

10 February 2015	Nõmme Kalju FC	2–3	FK Ventspils	Riga
13:15	Purje 3'; Dmitrijev 44'		Mujeci 28'; Karlsons 51'; Ignatāns 59'	Stadium: Skonto Hall

19 February 2015	FS METTA/LU	ANL	FB Gulbene	Riga
13:15				Stadium: Skonto Hall

== 7th Place ==
19 February 2015	FB Gulbene	ANL	Rēzeknes BJSS	Riga
13:15				Stadium: Skonto Hall

== 5th Place ==
24 February 2015	FS METTA/LU	1–1 (4–1 p)	Valmiera Glass FK/BSS	Riga
13:15	Fjodorovs 20'		Apsītis 23'	Stadium: Skonto Hall

== 3rd Place ==
25 February 2015	BFC Daugavpils	0–3	FK Jelgava	Riga
13:15			Bogdaškins 16' (pen.) ? 21'; Malašenoks 90+1'	Stadium: Skonto Hall

== Final ==
26 February 2015	Skonto FC	3–1	FK Liepāja	Riga
13:15	Gutkovskis 44'; Karašausks 45+1'; Milašēvičs 90+5'		Afanasjevs 58'	Stadium: Skonto Hall
