= 2018 Virsligas Winter Cup =

2018 Virslīgas Ziemas kausa
Tournament details
- Country: Latvia
- Teams: 8

Final positions
- Champions: FK RFS
- Runner-up: Spartaks Jūrmala

Tournament statistics
- Matches played: 12
- Goals scored: 38 (3.17 per match)

The 2018 Virsligas Winter Cup was the league cup's sixth season. It began on 9 March 2018. FK RFS were the defending champions, who retained the title, defeating Spartaks Jūrmala in a penalty shootout in the final.

== Quarterfinals ==
9 March 2018	FK Ventspils	0–2	FK RFS	Skonto Hall, Riga
17:30 UTC+2		Report (in Latvian)	Uvarenko 78' (o.g.); Dubra 88'

9 March 2018	FK Jelgava	0–0 (4–1 p)	FK Liepāja	Skonto Hall, Riga
20:00 UTC+2		Report (in Latvian)
	Penalties
	Olberkis (penalty scored); Krušatins (penalty scored); Grigarāvičs (penalty scored); Kurtišs (penalty scored)		Zárate (penalty scored)

10 March 2018	Valmieras FK	0–4	FS METTA/LU	Skonto Hall, Riga
14:30 UTC+2		Report (in Latvian)	Šibass 31'; Ivanovs 42' (pen.); Dzhamalutdinov 55'; Kovaļonoks 88'

10 March 2018	Riga FC	1–2	Spartaks Jūrmala	Skonto Hall, Riga
17:00 UTC+2	Pētersons 12'	Report (in Latvian)	Vagančuks 19'; 43'

== 5 – 8 places ==
Semifinals

14 March 2018	FK Ventspils	1–7	FK Liepāja	Skonto Hall, Riga
14:30 UTC+2	Kokins 26' (pen.)	[Report] (in Latvian)	Jurkovskis 11'; Karlsons 21', 56', 60'; Karašausks 25'; Apiņš 34', 63'

15 March 2018	Valmieras FK	1–2	Riga FC	Skonto Hall, Riga
14:30 UTC+2	55'	[Report] (in Latvian)	Vaštšuk 62', 72' (pen.)

Seventh place

24 March 2018	FK Ventspils	1–1 (5–3 p)	Valmieras FK	Skonto Hall, Riga
14:00 UTC+2	Talbergs 41'	[Report] (in Latvian)	Ērglis 20'

Fifth place

24 March 2018	FK Liepāja	1–2	Riga FC	Skonto Hall, Riga
17:00 UTC+2	Jemeļins 80'	[Report] (in Latvian)	Lemajić 47'; Mokrusins 90+2'

== Semifinals ==
16 March 2018	FK RFS	2–1	FK Jelgava	Skonto Hall, Riga
17:30 UTC+2	Kļuškins 1'; Isajevs 45+1'	[Report] (in Latvian)	Siņeļņikovs 8'

16 March 2018	FS METTA/LU	0–1	Spartaks Jūrmala	Skonto Hall, Riga
20:00 UTC+2		[Report] (in Latvian)	Gauračs 44'

== Third place ==
25 March 2018	FS METTA/LU	4–1	FK Jelgava	Skonto Hall, Riga
14:00 UTC+2	Kovaļonoks 2', 40'; J. Laguns 18'; Strods 35'	[Report] (in Latvian)	Kolyayev 59'

== Final ==
25 March 2018	Spartaks Jūrmala	2–2 (4–5 p)	FK RFS	Skonto Hall, Riga
17:00 UTC+2	Vagančuks 11'; Višņakovs 33'	[Report] (in Latvian)	Platonaw 46'; Isajevs 50'
