= 2012 Commonwealth of Independent States Cup =

CIS Cup, Кубок Содружества 2012

Tournament details
- Host country: Russia
- Dates: 19–29 January 2012
- Teams: 12
- Venue(s): 1 (in 1 host city)

Final positions
- Champions: Russia (1st title)
- Runners-up: Belarus

Tournament statistics
- Matches played: 36
- Goals scored: 89 (2.47 per match)
- Top scorer(s): (Iran) Sardar Azmoun (7 goals)

2012 Commonwealth of Independent States Cup was the 20th annual Commonwealth of Independent States Cup since its establishment in 1993. It was hosted in Saint Petersburg, Russia between 19 and 29 January 2012.

Saint Petersburg hosted the event for the third time, with all matches being held in a single venue (Saint Petersburg Sports and Concert Complex). For this edition of the tournament the format of the competition was changed. All participating nations were represented by their youth (U20/U21) national teams, rather than by champions of domestic leagues.

== Format ==
- Group stage

Twelve teams were divided into three groups of four. The top two of each group qualified automatically for a play-off along with the two best third placed teams. The other third placed team along with the three bottom participants out of each group proceed to the group which would place its members between the 9th through the 12th places.

- Playoffs

The winners of the quarter-finals advanced further into semi-finals, while the other four less fortunate entered play-off for the fifth place. Next the winners of the semi-finals advanced to the final, while the other two participants played for the third place. Simultaneously the winners of the play-off for the fifth place continued to the fifth place match, while the other two played for the seventh place.

== Participants ==
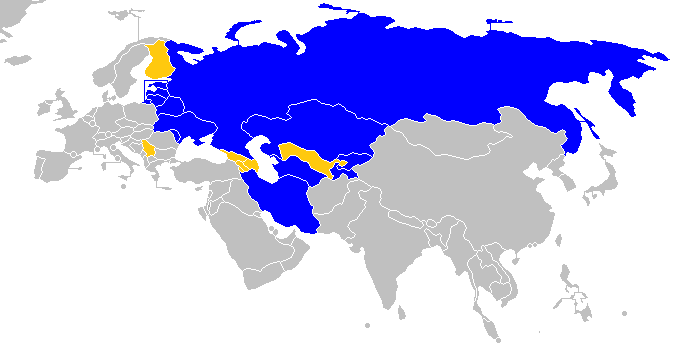
Countries participating in CIS Cup Past CIS Cup participants Countries that never participated in the CIS Cup

Team	Coach	Notes	Participation
Russia U21	(Russia) Nikolai Pisarev	Host	10th
Belarus U20	(Belarus) Aleksey Vergeyenko		1st
Ukraine U21	(Ukraine) Pavlo Yakovenko		1st
Lithuania U21	(Lithuania) Vitalijus Stankevičius		1st
Latvia U21	(Netherlands) Anton Joore		1st
Estonia U21	(Germany) Frank Bernhardt		1st
Moldova U21	(Moldova) Alexandru Curteian		1st
Kazakhstan U21	(Serbia) Slobodan Krčmarević		1st
Tajikistan U20	(Tajikistan) Salohiddin Gafurov		1st
Kyrgyzstan U20	(Kyrgyzstan) Murat Jumakeyev		1st
Turkmenistan U20	(Turkmenistan) Baýram Durdyýew		1st
Iran U20	(Iran) Akbar Mohammadi		1st

== Group stage ==
=== Group A ===
Team	Pld	W	D	L	GF	GA	GD	Pts
Russia	3	2	1	0	2	0	+2	7
Kazakhstan	3	2	0	1	6	3	+3	6
Turkmenistan	3	1	1	1	2	3	−1	4
Estonia	3	0	0	3	1	5	−4	0

==== Results ====
All times UTC+3

19 January 2012
14:15

Estonia	0 – 1	Turkmenistan
	Report	Annasahatow 83'

SKK Peterburgsky, Saint Petersburg
Attendance: 1,000
Referee: German Kravchenko (Russia)
19 January 2012
17:00

Russia	1 – 0	Kazakhstan
Zabolotny 23'	Report

SKK Peterburgsky, Saint Petersburg
Attendance: 5,000
Referee: Sergey Ivanov (Russia)

20 January 2012
17:30

Kazakhstan	3 – 1	Turkmenistan
Lisenkov 66'; Shchotkin 73', 90'	Report	Muradow 22'

SKK Peterburgsky, Saint Petersburg
Attendance: 300
Referee: Igor Nizovtsev (Russia)
20 January 2012
20:00

Russia	1 – 0	Estonia
Bibilov 57'	Report

SKK Peterburgsky, Saint Petersburg
Attendance: 500
Referee: Vitali Anisimov (Russia)

22 January 2012
17:30

Kazakhstan	3 – 1	Estonia
Khizhnichenko 3'; Shchotkin 38'; Tagybergen 86'	Report	Kaldoja 90'

SKK Peterburgsky, Saint Petersburg
Attendance: 150
Referee: Vladimir Seldyakov (Russia)
22 January 2012
20:00

Russia	0 – 0	Turkmenistan
	Report

SKK Peterburgsky, Saint Petersburg
Attendance: 400
Referee: Denis Shpilev (Russia)

=== Group B ===
Team	Pld	W	D	L	GF	GA	GD	Pts
Ukraine	3	3	0	0	7	0	+7	9
Moldova	3	1	1	1	2	2	0	4
Latvia	3	1	1	1	3	4	−1	4
Kyrgyzstan	3	0	0	3	3	9	−6	0

==== Results ====
All times UTC+3

19 January 2012
12:00

Kyrgyzstan	2 – 3	Latvia
Murzaev 21' (pen.); Musabekov 84'	Report	Karašausks 15'; Kichin 34' (o.g.); Vardanjans 86'

SKK Peterburgsky, Saint Petersburg
Attendance: 300
Referee: Denis Shpilev (Russia)
19 January 2012
20:00

Ukraine	1 – 0	Moldova
Shevchuk 15'	Report

SKK Peterburgsky, Saint Petersburg
Attendance: 300
Referee: Vladimir Seldyakov (Russia)

21 January 2012
12:30

Ukraine	4 – 0	Kyrgyzstan
Fedotov 13'; Budkivskyi 22', 32', 45+1'	Report

SKK Peterburgsky, Saint Petersburg
Attendance: 100
Referee: Sergey Kostevich (Russia)
21 January 2012
15:00

Moldova	0 – 0	Latvia
	Report

SKK Peterburgsky, Saint Petersburg
Attendance: 100
Referee: Aleksey Sukhoy (Russia)

22 January 2012
12:30

Ukraine	2 – 0	Latvia
Pavlov 7' (pen.); Budkivskyi 90'	Report

SKK Peterburgsky, Saint Petersburg
Attendance: 100
Referee: Sergey Smirnov (Russia)
22 January 2012
15:00

Moldova	2 – 1	Kyrgyzstan
Plătică 69'; Jardan 81'	Report	Sharipov 75'

SKK Peterburgsky, Saint Petersburg
Attendance: 100
Referee: Pavel Shadykhanov (Russia)

=== Group C ===
Team	Pld	W	D	L	GF	GA	GD	Pts
Iran	3	2	1	0	8	0	+8	7
Lithuania	3	1	1	1	1	3	−2	4
Belarus	3	1	1	1	2	1	+1	4
Tajikistan	3	0	1	2	0	7	−7	1

==== Results ====
All times UTC+3

20 January 2012
12:30

Belarus	0 – 0	Iran
	Report

SKK Peterburgsky, Saint Petersburg
Attendance: 300
Referee: Vasili Kazartsev (Russia)
20 January 2012
15:00

Tajikistan	0 – 0	Lithuania
	Report

SKK Peterburgsky, Saint Petersburg
Attendance: 300
Referee: Vasili Miroshnichenko (Russia)

21 January 2012
17:30

Belarus	2 – 0	Tajikistan
Teplov 35', 85'	Report

SKK Peterburgsky, Saint Petersburg
Attendance: 300
Referee: Aleksei Matyunin (Russia)
21 January 2012
20:00

Iran	3 – 0	Lithuania
Jahan Kohan 18', 90'; Azmoun 65'	Report

SKK Peterburgsky, Saint Petersburg
Attendance: 300
Referee: Dmitri Veselov (Russia)

23 January 2012
17:30

Belarus	0 – 1	Lithuania
	Report	Žulpa 21'

SKK Peterburgsky, Saint Petersburg
Attendance: 200
Referee: German Kravchenko (Russia)
23 January 2012
20:00

Iran	5 – 0	Tajikistan
Barzay 20'; Azmoun 47', 50', 84'; Esmaeili 71'	Report

SKK Peterburgsky, Saint Petersburg
Attendance: 200
Referee: Sergey Ivanov (Russia)

== Consolation round ==
=== Places 9 to 12 ===
Pos	Team	Pld	W	D	L	GF	GA	GD	Pts
9	Kyrgyzstan	3	3	0	0	8	2	+6	9
10	Estonia	3	1	1	1	4	3	+1	4
11	Tajikistan	3	0	2	1	3	5	−2	2
12	Turkmenistan	3	0	1	2	2	7	−5	1

=== Results ===
24 January 2012
17:30

Turkmenistan	1 – 3	Kyrgyzstan
Saparow 90'	Report	Rustamov 25', 45', 90'

SKK Peterburgsky, Saint Petersburg
Attendance: 100
Referee: Vasili Miroshnichenko (Russia)
24 January 2012
20:00

Tajikistan	1 – 1	Estonia
Gaforov 44'	Report	Kase 5'

SKK Peterburgsky, Saint Petersburg
Attendance: 150
Referee: Igor Nizovtsev (Russia)

26 January 2012
17:30

Estonia	3 – 0	Turkmenistan
Paponov 78'; Indermitte 90+1'; Kaldoja 90+3'	Report

SKK Peterburgsky, Saint Petersburg
Attendance: 100
Referee: Aleksei Matyunin (Russia)
26 January 2012
20:00

Kyrgyzstan	3 – 1	Tajikistan
Rustamov 26'; Sharipov 77' (pen.); Shamshiev 85'	Report	Gaforov 45'

SKK Peterburgsky, Saint Petersburg
Attendance: 300
Referee: Dmitri Veselov (Russia)

28 January 2012
12:30

Turkmenistan	1 – 1	Tajikistan
U.Astanow 75'	Report	Gaforov 53'

SKK Peterburgsky, Saint Petersburg
Attendance: 300
Referee: Vitali Anisimov (Russia)
28 January 2012
14:30

Estonia	0 – 2	Kyrgyzstan
	Report	Rustamov 25'; Murzaev 76'

SKK Peterburgsky, Saint Petersburg
Attendance: 100
Referee: Denis Shpilev (Russia)

== Final stages ==
=== Bracket ===
5th place match (29 Jan)
Lithuania	0
Iran	4
7th place match (29 Jan)
Kazakhstan (p)	3
Moldova	3

5th – 8th place (27 Jan)
Lithuania (p)	0
Kazakhstan	0
Iran	3
Moldova	0

Quarterfinals (25 Jan)
Ukraine (p)	1
Lithuania	1
Kazakhstan	2
Belarus	3
Iran	1
Latvia (p)	1
Russia	2
Moldova	1

Semifinals (27 Jan)
Ukraine	1
Belarus (p)	1
Latvia	1
Russia	2

Final (29 Jan)
Belarus	0
Russia	2
3rd place match (29 Jan)
Ukraine	3
Latvia	0

=== Quarterfinals ===
25 January 2012
12:30

Kazakhstan	2 – 3	Belarus
Dzholchiyev 44'; Goryachi 89'	Report	Saroka 53' (pen.), 64'; Teplov 75'

SKK Peterburgsky, Saint Petersburg
Attendance: 150
Referee: Vitali Anisimov (Russia)
25 January 2012
15:00

Iran	1 – 1	Latvia
Azmoun 90'	Report	Karašausks 10'
Penalties
Jahanbakhsh (penalty missed); Azmoun (penalty missed); Daneshgar (penalty scored)	1–4	(penalty scored) Ševeļovs; (penalty scored) Pētersons; (penalty scored) Zjuzins; (penalty scored) Puķītis

SKK Peterburgsky, Saint Petersburg
Attendance: 150
Referee: Sergey Kostevich (Russia)
25 January 2012
17:30

Ukraine	1 – 1	Lithuania
Budkivskyi 75'	Report	Juozaitis 43'
Penalties
Bohdanov (penalty missed); Pavlov (penalty scored); Budkivskyi (penalty scored); Partsvania (penalty scored); Kushnirov (penalty scored)	4–3	(penalty scored) Žulpa; (penalty missed) Urbaitis; (penalty scored) Brokas; (penalty scored) Jarmalavičius; (penalty missed) Nakrošius

SKK Peterburgsky, Saint Petersburg
Attendance: 150
Referee: Aleksey Sukhoy (Russia)
25 January 2012
20:00

Russia	2 – 1	Moldova
Bayramyan 8'; Zhestokov 52'	Report	Prodan 66'

SKK Peterburgsky, Saint Petersburg
Attendance: 500
Referee: Vasili Kazartsev (Russia)

=== Places 5 to 8 ===
27 January 2012
12:30

Lithuania	0 – 0	Kazakhstan
	Report
Penalties
Žulpa (penalty scored); Jarmalavičius (penalty scored); Simaitis (penalty scored); Juozaitis (penalty scored); Novikovas (penalty scored)	5–3	(penalty scored) Beisebekov; (penalty scored) Shchotkin; (penalty missed) Khizhnichenko; (penalty scored) Goryachi

SKK Peterburgsky, Saint Petersburg
Attendance: 100
Referee: Pavel Shadykhanov (Russia)
27 January 2012
15:00

Iran	3 – 0	Moldova
Barzay 20'; Azmoun 90+1'; Abdollahzadeh 90+3'	Report

SKK Peterburgsky, Saint Petersburg
Attendance: 100
Referee: Sergey Smirnov (Russia)

=== Semifinals ===
27 January 2012
17:30

Ukraine	1 – 1	Belarus
Bohdanov 69'	Report	Saroka 82'
Penalties
Bohdanov (penalty missed); Babenko (penalty scored); Pavlov (penalty scored); Partsvania (penalty scored)	3–5	(penalty scored) Drigalev; (penalty scored) Novik; (penalty scored) Suvorov; (penalty scored) Klopotskiy; (penalty scored) Saroka

SKK Peterburgsky, Saint Petersburg
Attendance: 300
Referee: Vasili Kazartsev (Russia)
27 January 2012
20:00

Latvia	1 – 2	Russia
Zjuzins 89'	Report	Zhestokov 4'; Vasilyev 36'

SKK Peterburgsky, Saint Petersburg
Attendance: 300
Referee: Aleksey Sukhoy (Russia)

=== 7th place match ===
29 January 2012
12:00

Kazakhstan	3 – 3	Moldova
Beisebekov 39'; Khizhnichenko 58'; Islamkhan 71'	Report	Dima 22'; Gînsari 67'; Iavorschi 90'
Penalties
Beisebekov (penalty scored); Islamkhan (penalty scored); Levin (penalty scored); Goryachi (penalty scored); Khizhnichenko (penalty scored)	5–4	(penalty missed) Antoniuc; (penalty scored) Gînsari; (penalty scored) Nicologlo; (penalty scored) Apostol; (penalty scored) Iavorschi

SKK Peterburgsky, Saint Petersburg
Attendance: 100
Referee: Sergey Kostevich (Russia)

=== 5th place match ===
29 January 2012
14:15

Lithuania	0 – 4	Iran
	Report	Azmoun 53'; Jahan Kohan 67'; Alipour 75'; Esmaeili 85'

SKK Peterburgsky, Saint Petersburg
Attendance: 100
Referee: Vasili Miroshnichenko (Russia)

=== 3rd place match ===
29 January 2012
16:30

Ukraine	3 – 0	Latvia
Babenko 27'; Cheremysin 41'; Budkivskyi 89'	Report

SKK Peterburgsky, Saint Petersburg
Attendance: 1,000
Referee: Igor Nizovtsev (Russia)

=== Final ===
29 January 2012
19:00

Belarus	0 – 2	Russia
	Report	Delkin 30', 55'

SKK Peterburgsky, Saint Petersburg
Attendance: 3,000
Referee: Sergey Ivanov (Russia)

== Final standing ==
Rank	Team
1st place, gold medalist(s)	Russia
2nd place, silver medalist(s)	Belarus
3rd place, bronze medalist(s)	Ukraine
4	Latvia
5	Iran
6	Lithuania
7	Kazakhstan
8	Moldova
9	Kyrgyzstan
10	Estonia
11	Tajikistan
12	Turkmenistan

== Top scorers ==
Rank	Player	Team	Goals
1	(Iran) Sardar Azmoun	Iran	7
2	(Ukraine) Pylyp Budkivskyi	Ukraine	6
3	(Kyrgyzstan) Tursunali Rustamov	Kyrgyzstan	5
4	(Belarus) Anton Saroka	Belarus	3
4	(Belarus) Artem Teplov	Belarus	3
4	(Iran) Amin Jahan Kohan	Iran	3
4	(Kazakhstan) Aleksey Shchotkin	Kazakhstan	3
4	(Tajikistan) Shodibek Gaforov	Tajikistan	3
