= 2011–12 Latvian Football Cup =

Tournament details
- Country: Latvia

Final positions
- Champions: Skonto
- Runners-up: Liepājas Metalurgs

The 2011–12 Latvian Football Cup was the 17th edition of the Latvian annual football knockout tournament. The winners will qualify for the second qualifying round of the 2012–13 UEFA Europa League.

== First round ==
The matches of this round took place between 29 May and 6 June 2011.

Team 1	Score	Team 2
FK Olaine	0–1	Iecava
Sigulda	0–1	Alberts Riga
FK Ērgļi	0–3	FK Avantis Rīga
FK Pļaviņas DM	0–3^{1}	FK Kvarcs/Madona
FK Alūksne	2–0	FK Staiceles Bebri
FK Aizkraukle	0–3	FK Smiltene BJSS
FC Ķekava	0–1	Grobinas SC
SK Upesciems	2–1	SB Austrumi/Balvu vilki
FK Jelgava/Jaunieši	3–4	KFC/TB
Dobele	0–1	FK Mārupe
FK Ozolnieki	4–0	FK Mērsrags

^{1}Match originally ended 3–1.

== Second round ==
The 11 winners from the first round and Zelis Gulbene, who received a bye into this round, competed in this stage of the competition. These matches took place between 14 and 21 June 2011.

Team 1	Score	Team 2
Alberts Riga	6–2 (a.e.t.)	FK Ozolnieki
KFC/TB	1–6	FK Kvarcs/Madona
FK Alūksne	0–3	SK Upesciems
FK Mārupe	1–3	Zelis Gulbene
FK Avantis Rīga	0–3	Iecava
Grobinas SC	Cancelled^{2}	FK Smiltene BJSS

^{2}Match not played; both teams advance.

== Third round ==
Entering this round were the 6 winners from the previous round and 10 teams who enter the competition in this round. These matches took place between 1 and 17 July 2011.

Team 1	Score	Team 2
Zelis Gulbene	0–12	RFS
Tukums 2000	2–0	Alberts Riga
FK Ozolnieki	4–1	SK Upesciems
Metta/LU	3–1	BFC Daugava
Spartaks	5–0	Iecava
Ogre/FK33	0–4	Valmieras
Grobinas SC	0–0 (a.e.t.); 2–4 (pen.)	FK Kvarcs/Madona
Varavīksne	2–0	FK Smiltene BJSS

== Fourth round ==
On 17 July 2011, two winners from the previous round played each other for a spot in this stage of the competition.

Team 1	Score	Team 2
FK Ozolnieki	0–3	Tukums 2000

This winner, the remaining 6 winners from the previous round and the remaining 9 teams from the Latvian Higher League competed in this stage of the competition. These matches took place on 30 and 31 July 2011.

Team 1	Score	Team 2
Metta/LU	0–3	FC Jūrmala
RFS	0–2	Skonto
FK Kvarcs/Madona	0–11	Daugava Daugavpils
Varavīksne	1–3	Liepājas Metalurgs
Spartaks	1–2	Ventspils
Valmieras	1–3 (a.e.t.)	Gulbene 2005
Tukums 2000	0–4	FK Jūrmala-VV
Jelgava	3–1	Olimps/RFS

== Quarter-finals ==
17 March 2012
14:00 EET

Liepājas Metalurgs	1–0	Daugava Daugavpils
Bagužis 73'	Report

Daugava Stadium, Liepāja
Attendance: 600
Referee: Andris Treimanis
18 March 2012
14:00 EET

Jūrmala-VV	1–3	Gulbene 2005
Kalniņš 90+1'	Report	Saito 13', 27'; Hačatrjans 75'

Slokas Stadium, Jūrmala
Attendance: 150
Referee: Ivars Caune
18 March 2012
15:00 EET

Jelgava	2–1 (a.e.t.)	Ventspils
Kozlovs 4', 110'	Report	Gubins 25' (o.g.)

Olympic Sports Center of Zemgale, Jelgava
Attendance: 700
Referee: Aleksandrs Golubevs
18 March 2012
16:00 EET

FC Jūrmala	0–1	Skonto
	Report	Siņeļņikovs 40'

Slokas Stadium, Jūrmala
Attendance: 500
Referee: Vadim Čerņikovs

== Semi-finals ==
11 April 2012
17:30 EET

Jelgava	1–4	Liepājas Metalurgs
Bogdaškins 63'	Report	Kalns 12'; Krjauklis 15'; Kamešs 60'; Savaļnieks 71'

Olympic Sports Center of Zemgale, Jelgava
Attendance: 600
Referee: Andris Treimanis
11 April 2012
18:00 EET

Glubene 2005	0–1	Skonto
	Report	Fertovs 90+3'

Skonto halle, Gulbene
Attendance: 350
Referee: Aleksandrs Anufrijevs

== Final ==
12 May 2012
17:00 EET

Liepājas Metalurgs	1–1 (a.e.t.)	Skonto
Kamešs 75'	Report	Šabala 55'
Penalties
Soloņicins (penalty scored); Surņins (penalty scored); Kļava (penalty scored); Krjauklis (penalty missed); Prohorenkovs (penalty missed)	3–4	Siņeļņikovs (penalty missed); Siņicins (penalty scored); Pētersons (penalty scored); Fertovs (penalty scored); Amirhanovs (penalty scored)

Daugava Stadium, Liepāja
Attendance: 2,731
Referee: Vadims Direktorenko
