= 2013 Latvian Supercup =

Latvian football competition

Daugava	Skonto
4	1
- Details
- Date: 9 March 2013
- Venue: Celtnieks Stadium, Daugavpils
- Referee: Aleksandrs Anufrijevs (Riga)
- Attendance: 600
- Weather: Partly Cloudy −5 °C (23 °F)

The 2013 Latvian Supercup was the first edition of the Latvian Supercup, an annual football match organised by Latvian Football Federation and contested by the reigning champions of the two main Latvian club competitions, the Latvian Higher League and the Latvian Football Cup. It was played at the Celtnieks Stadium in Daugavpils on 9 March 2013, between the 2012 Latvian Higher League winners Daugava and the 2011–12 Latvian Football Cup winners Skonto.

== Venue ==
The Celtnieks Stadium was opened in 1989, and it is the home stadium of Latvian Higher League team BFC Daugavpils.

The net capacity of the Celtnieks Stadium is 2,000. In October 2011, the next generation artificial turf was laid on the stadium with size: 105 x 68 meters. The last renovation of the stadium took place in 2000.

== Teams ==
Team	Qualification	Previous participation (bold indicates winners)
Daugava	2012 Latvian Higher League winners	None
Skonto	2011–12 Latvian Football Cup winners	None

== Match ==
=== Details ===
9 March 2013
14:00 EEST

Daugava	4–1	Skonto
Ibe 18'; Babatunde 23'; Pētersons 32'; Ola 68'	Report	Ivanovs 80'

Celtnieks Stadium, Daugavpils
Attendance: 600
Referee: Aleksandrs Anufrijevs (Riga)

**Daugava**	**Skonto**

Assistant referees:
Vasīlijs Botošs (Jelgava)
Igors Tagijevs (Liepāja)
Fourth official:
Ivars Caune (Daugavpils)
Referee observer:
Vitālijs Liholajs (Jurmala)
LFF Delegate:
Arturs Gaidels (Riga)

**Match rules**

- 90 minutes.
- 30 minutes of extra time if necessary.
- Penalty shoot-out if score is still level.
- Seven named substitutes.
- Maximum of three substitutions.
