= 2017 Virsligas Winter Cup =

2017 Virslīgas Ziemas kausa
Tournament details
- Country: Latvia; Lithuania; Estonia
- Teams: 15

Final positions
- Champions: FK RFS
- Runners-up: FK Liepāja

Tournament statistics
- Matches played: 26
- Goals scored: 84 (3.23 per match)

The 2017 Virsligas Winter Cup was the league cup's fifth season. It began on 14 January 2017. FK Liepāja were the defending champions.

== Group stage ==
Team	Pld	W	D	L	GF	GA	GD	Pts
(Latvia) FK RFS	5	5	0	0	16	5	+11	15
(Latvia) FK Liepāja	6	4	1	1	16	7	+9	13
(Latvia) FS METTA/LU	6	3	1	2	8	9	−1	10
(Lithuania) FK Sūduva Marijampolė	3	2	1	0	6	3	+3	7
(Latvia) FK Jelgava	5	2	1	2	5	5	0	7
(Latvia) FK Spartaks Jūrmala	4	2	0	2	9	6	+3	6
(Latvia) FK Ventspils	3	2	0	1	5	3	+2	6
(Estonia) Nõmme Kalju FC	2	1	1	0	5	2	+3	4
(Latvia) Riga FC	3	1	1	1	5	4	+1	4
(Lithuania) FK Utenis Utena	2	0	1	1	1	4	−3	1
(Estonia) FCI Tallinn	3	0	1	2	2	5	−3	1
(Lithuania) FK Šilas Kazlų Rūda	2	0	0	2	2	6	−4	0
(Latvia) BFC Daugavpils	2	0	0	2	1	7	−6	0
(Latvia) SK Babīte	4	0	0	4	2	9	−7	0
(Lithuania) FK Trakai	2	0	0	2	1	9	−8	0
