= Ibrahim Babatunde =

Nigerian association football player

Personal information
- Full name: Olalekan Ibrahim Babatunde
- Date of birth: 29 December 1984 (age 41)
- Place of birth: Lagos, Nigeria
- Height: 1.78 m (5 ft 10 in)
- Position: Striker

Team information
- Current team: Ravecchia
- Number: 11

Youth career
- 2000–2002: Parma

Senior career*
Years	Team	Apps	(Gls)
2002–2003	Arezzo	5	(0)
2003–2004	Piacenza	5	(0)
2004–2005	Mons	18	(2)
2005–2007	Msida St. Joseph	48	(18)
2007–2008	Horsens	6	(0)
2008–2010	Nocerina	40	(9)
2011–2012	Birkirkara	11	(3)
2013–2014	Daugava	24	(8)
2014–2015	Racing Beirut	11	(1)
2015–2016	Saronno	?	(?)
2016–2017	Garda	24	(15)
2017–2018	Vedeggio	?	(?)
2018–2019	Novazzano	11	(3)
2019–2020	Real Melegnano	?	(?)
2020–2021	Vedeggio	?	(?)
2021–2022	Locarno	?	(?)
2022-	Ravecchia	?	(?)
- * Club domestic league appearances and goals

Olalekan Ibrahim Babatunde (born 29 December 1984) is a Nigerian professional footballer who plays as a striker for Swiss 4. Liga club FC Ravecchia.

== Career ==
Babatunde, a striker, began his career in Italy, where he entered the youth system at Parma in 2008. After a brief stint with Arezzo, he made his Serie A debut in the 2002–03 season for Piacenza against his former club Parma, coming on as a 64th-minute substitute for Claudio Ferrarese in a 2–3 away loss at Stadio Ennio Tardini.

After only two appearances in Serie A, and three in the Serie B the following season, after Piacenza had suffered relegation, Babatunde had spells in Belgium, at Mons, and then in Malta, at Msida St. Joseph. At the latter, he was voted for the Malta Football Best Foreign Player award. In 2007, he signed with Danish Superliga club AC Horsens. He was first the subject of racist taunts in a match on 26 September 2007 against Næstved Boldklub. Babatunde was the subject of racism again in a friendly against Holstein Kiel in January 2018, when Kiel player Peter Schyrba called him "an animal".

In 2008, Babatunde returned to Italy to play for Nocerina. He won the 2008–09 Serie D title with the Campania-based team and was promoted to the Lega Pro Prima Divisione. Following an injury, he left the club in 2010.

In February 2011, Babatunde returned to Malta, reaching an agreement with Birkirkara. At the end of the season, he left the club when his contract expired, and in March 2013, he joined Latvian Higher League champions Daugava and helped them win the Latvian Supercup. In September 2014, he moved to the Lebanese Premier League side Racing Beirut before returning to Italy in 2015, playing for amateur clubs Saronno, Garda, Vedeggio, Novazzano and Real Melegnano the following years.

In July 2021, Babatunde made his footballing comeback, signing for FC Locarno in the sixth-tier Swiss 2. Liga.

== Honours ==
Daugava

- Latvian Supercup: 2013
