= 2014 Latvian Supercup =

Latvian football competition

Ventspils	Skonto
- Date: 8 March 2014 (Canceled)

The 2014 Latvian Supercup was scheduled to be the second edition of the Latvian Supercup, an annual football match organised by Latvian Football Federation and contested by the reigning champions of the two main Latvian club competitions, the Latvian Higher League and the Latvian Football Cup. It was intended to be played on 8 March 2014, between the 2013 Latvian Higher League and 2012–13 Latvian Football Cup winners Ventspils and the 2013 Latvian Higher League runner-up Skonto. The match was rescheduled to an unknown date.

== Teams ==
Team	Qualification	Previous participation (bold indicates winners)
Ventspils	2013 Latvian Higher League and 2012–13 Latvian Football Cup winners	None
Skonto	2013 Latvian Higher League runner-up	2013
