= Virsligas Winter Cup =

- Founded: 2013
- Abolished: 2018
- Region: Latvia
- Last champions: Skonto FC and FK RFS (2 titles)
- Most championships: Skonto FC and FK RFS (2 titles)

The Virsligas Winter Cup (Latvian: Virslīgas Ziemas kauss) was a league cup in Latvian football. It started in 2013 and ended after the 2018 competition. Since the tournament was held at the beginning of the year, it was called the Winter Cup.

== List of finals ==
The results of the finals:

Year	Winner	Runner-up	Score
2013	FC Daugava	FK Ventspils	3–0
2014	Skonto FC	FK Jelgava	3–2
2015	Skonto FC	FK Liepāja	3–1
2016	FK Liepāja	FK Ventspils	1–0
2017	FK RFS	FK Liepāja	n/a
2018	FK RFS	FK Spartaks Jūrmala	2–2 (5–4 pso)

== Total titles won ==
Club	Winners	Runners-up	Winning years
Skonto FC	2	0	2014, 2015
FK RFS	2	0	2017, 2018
FK Liepāja	1	2	2016
FC Daugava	1	0	2013
FK Ventspils	0	2	
FK Jelgava	0	1	
