= Aleksandrs Fertovs =

Latvian footballer (born 1987)

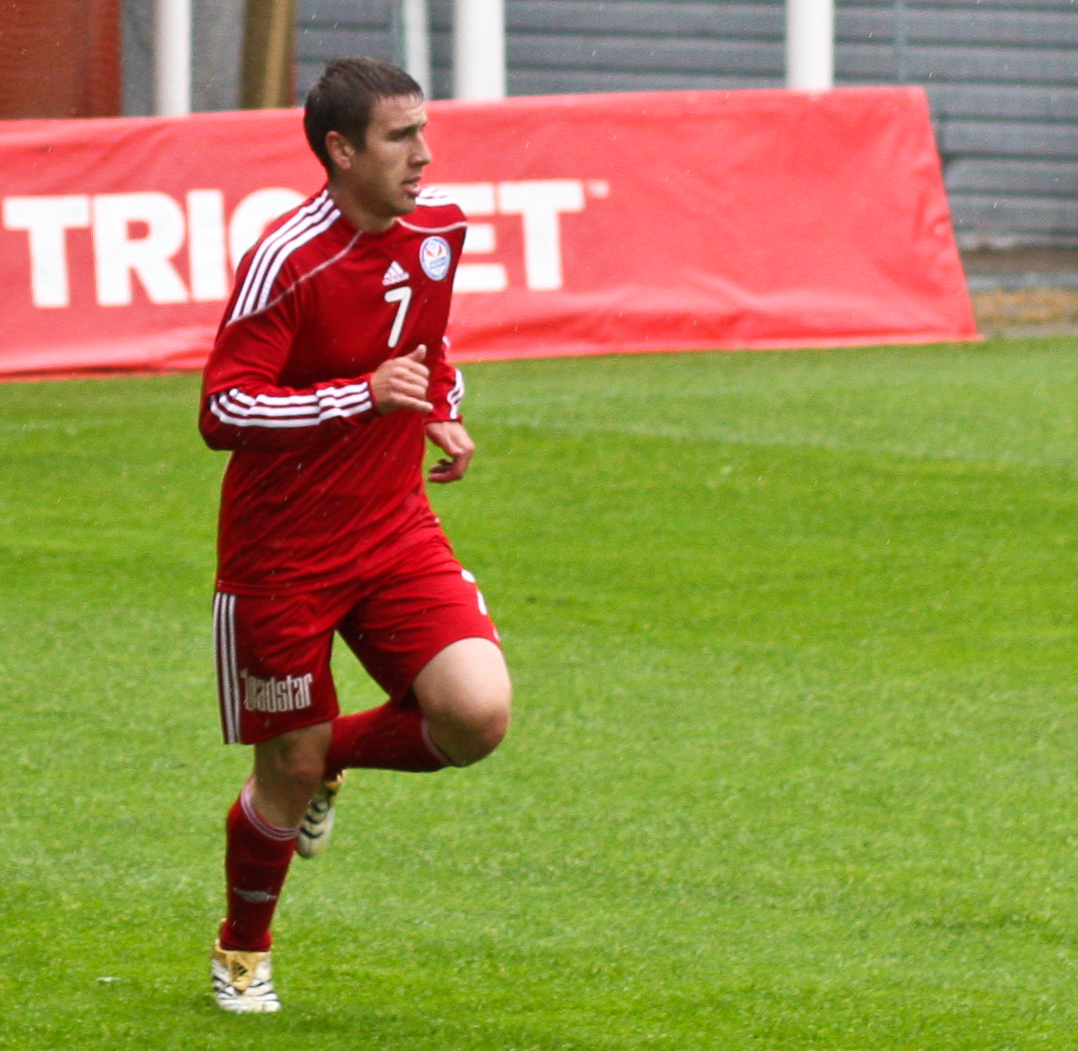
- Aleksandrs Fertovs playing for Skonto

Personal information
- Full name: Aleksandrs Fertovs
- Date of birth: 16 June 1987 (age 39)
- Place of birth: Riga, Latvian Soviet Socialist Republic, USSR (now Republic of Latvia)
- Height: 1.81 m (5 ft 11 1/2 in)
- Position: Midfielder

Youth career
- 1998–2007: JFC Skonto

Senior career*
Years	Team	Apps	(Gls)
2007	JFK Olimps	13	(0)
2008–2013	Skonto Riga	125	(13)
2008	→ JFK Olimps (loan)	17	(3)
2014	PFK Sevastopol	9	(3)
2015–2016	Korona Kielce	47	(0)
2016	Korona Kielce II	2	(0)
2016–2019	FK RFS	54	(1)
2020	Lokomotiv Daugavpils	11	(2)
Total		278	(22)

International career
2007–2009	Latvia U21		
2009–2018	Latvia	41	(0)
- * Club domestic league appearances and goals

Aleksandrs Fertovs (born 16 June 1987) is a Latvian former professional footballer who played as a midfielder. Fertovs's nickname in Latvia is Kaķis (Cat).

== Club career ==
=== Early career ===
Fertovs started playing football in 1998, at the age of 11. As a youth player, he played for his local club JFC Skonto and was a member of their academy. In 2007, he was transferred to the Latvian Higher League club JFK Olimps. Even though Olimps finished the championship in the last place of the table, Fertovs showed good performance, playing 13 matches during the season. In 2008, he was offered to join Skonto Riga's first team. The competition for places in the starting line-up was stiff, and the youngster found himself playing just one match for the club. Later he was loaned out and yet again joined JFK Olimps, who despite finishing last the previous season, had secured themselves a place in the Latvian Higher League for the upcoming one. Fertovs scored 3 goals in 17 matches during his loan spell at Olimps.

=== Skonto Riga ===
Fertovs returned to Skonto before the 2009 Latvian Higher League season. He gained a place in the starting line-up, playing 22 league matches in his full debut season at the club. In the 2010 season, Fertovs became champion of Latvia under the manager Aleksandrs Starkovs. He scored twice in 23 league matches. During the next two seasons, Fertovs played 52 league matches, scoring 3 goals. In 2011, Fertovs won the Baltic League with Skonto, and contributed to their Latvian Cup win in 2012. In 2011 Aleksandrs was included in both Latvian Football Federation and sportacentrs.com teams of the tournament. In 2012, he repeated it, being included in the LFF team of the year. The 2013 season saw Fertovs play 23 league matches and score 8 goals, being included in the LFF team of the year for the third consecutive year in a row, with Skonto finishing as the runners-up in the league.

=== Sevastopol ===
On 26 January 2014, Fertovs signed a contract with the Ukrainian Premier League club FC Sevastopol for two-and-a-half years. He scored his first league goal on 4 April 2014, helping Sevastopol beat Vorskla Poltava 1–0. On 23 April 2014, Fertovs scored twice, helping Sevastopol beat Metalurh Zaporizhya 5–0. He was later included in the football.ua and ua-football.com teams of the round. All in all, he played 9 Premier League matches for the club, scoring 3 goals. On 27 June 2014, it was announced that the club had been dissolved due to the Russian aggression in the region and all players were granted free agents' status.

== International career ==
From 2007 to 2009, Fertovs was a member of the Latvia under-21 team. He made his debut for the senior squad on 15 November 2009 in a friendly match against Honduras, coming on as a substitute in the 80th minute, replacing Genādijs Soloņicins. In total, Fertovs earned 41 caps for Latvia during his international career, spanning eight years.

== Honours ==
Skonto Riga

- Latvian Higher League: 2010
- Latvian Cup: 2011–12
- Baltic League: 2010–11

RFS

- Latvian Cup: 2019

Latvia

- Baltic Cup: 2012, 2014
