= Stanley Ibe =

Nigerian footballer

Personal information
- Full name: Stanley Ibe
- Date of birth: 19 July 1984 (age 42)
- Place of birth: Nigeria
- Height: 1.82 m (6 ft 0 in)
- Position: Striker

Team information
- Current team: Meteor Prague

Youth career
- 1999–2000: Taribo West Academy

Senior career*
Years	Team	Apps	(Gls)
2000–2003	Genoa	0	(0)
2001–2002	→ Javor (loan)	20	(6)
2002–2003	→ Ancona (loan)	11	(0)
2003–2004	Bregalnica Delčevo	27	(3)
2004–2005	Sloga Jugomagnat	11	(0)
2005–2012	Bohemians Prague	52	(7)
2010	→ FK Příbram (loan)	4	(0)
2012–2013	Daugava Daugavpils	31	(12)
2014	UTA Arad	4	(1)
2014–2015	Olympia Agnonese	?	(?)
2015–2016	Bohemians Prague	?	(?)
2016	Viktorie Jirny	?	(?)
2016–2017	Benešov	?	(?)
2017–	Meteor Prague	?	(?)
- * Club domestic league appearances and goals

Stanley Ibe (born 19 July 1984) is a Nigerian football striker who currently plays for Meteor Prague.

== Career ==
Ibe was playing in Nigeria in the Taribo West Academy when he was brought to Italy to Genoa C.F.C. He spent the first season in the youth team and the following two on loan, first with Serbian side FK Javor Ivanjica helping them to finish first and to win promotion to the First League of FR Yugoslavia, and in the next season he played with Ancona Calcio. Ibe was transferred to Macedonian First League club FK Bregalnica Delčevo in summer 2003.

In July 2004 he signed a contract with Bregalnica Delčevo's league rival FK Sloga Jugomagnat. He played for FK Sloga Jugomagnat till 2005, when was transferred to the Czech club Bohemians Prague. In summer 2006 he had a trial with NK Domzale, afterwards returning to the Czech Republic. During the first half of the 2010–11 season Ibe was on loan with 1. FK Příbram.

In July 2012 he joined the Latvian Higher League club Daugava Daugavpils, reaching his career's highest point so far and participating in the UEFA Champion's League. With 10 goals in 18 appearances during the 2012 Latvian Higher League season Ibe became Daugava's second top scorer and helped the club win the Latvian championship for the first time in its history. After the season, he was included in the sportacentrs.com Team of the Tournament alongside his fellow international Ahmed Abdultaofik from FK Ventspils, both filling the forwards' positions. In 2013 Ibe also helped Daugava lift the Latvian Supercup, scoring the first goal of the game. He left Daugava in October 2013 due to a long-term injury, with 2 goals in 13 league appearances during the 2013 Latvian Higher League season.

In March 2014 Ibe joined the Romanian Liga III side UTA Arad. Having recovered from the injury, he finished the season with 1 goal in 4 league appearances in the Romanian Liga II. His club was relegated from the league after the season.

In December 2014 he signed with the Italian team Olympia Agnonese. He returned to the Czech Republic in August 2015, re-joining Bohemians.

== Honours ==
Daugava Daugavpils

- Latvian Supercup: 2013
- Latvian Higher League: 2012

Javor

- Second League of FR Yugoslavia: 2001–02
