= 2024 Latvian Supercup =

Latvian football competition

FK RFS	Riga FC
- Date: 2 March 2024
- Venue: LNK Sporta Parks, Riga

The 2024 Latvian Supercup is scheduled to be the third edition of the Latvian Supercup, an annual football match organised by Latvian Football Federation and contested by the reigning champions of the two main Latvian club competitions, the Latvian Higher League and the Latvian Football Cup.

== Teams ==
Team	Qualification	Previous participation (bold indicates winners)
FK RFS	2023 Latvian Higher Leagues	None
Riga FC	2023 Latvian Football Cup	None

== Match ==
=== Details ===
2 March 2024
14:00 EEST

FK RFS	v	Riga FC

LNK Sporta Parks, Riga

**RFS**	**Riga FC**

Assistant referees:
TBA
TBA
Fourth official:
TBA
Additional assistant referees:
TBA
TBA

**Match rules**

- 90 minutes.
- Penalty shoot-out if score is still level.
- Nine named substitutes.
- Maximum of five substitutions.
