= Amin Jahan Kohan =

Iranian footballer

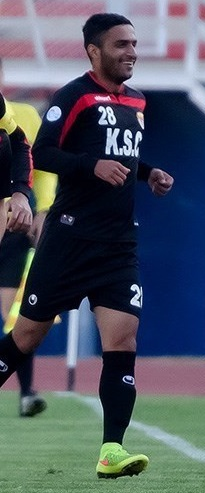

Personal information
- Date of birth: 7 March 1993 (age 33)
- Place of birth: Ahvaz, Iran
- Height: 1.85 m (6 ft 1 in)
- Positions: Attacking midfielder; winger

Team information
- Current team: Zob Ahan
- Number: 18

Youth career
- 2007–2014: Foolad

Senior career*
Years	Team	Apps	(Gls)
2012–2015	Foolad	1	(0)
2014–2015	→ Fajr Sepasi (loan)	2	(0)
2015	→ Malavan (loan)	0	(0)
2016–2017	Naft Masjed Soleyman	29	(0)
2017–2018	Malavan	24	(0)
2018–2020	Mes Kerman	51	(2)
2020–2021	Khooshe Talaee	18	(0)
2021–2022	Mes Kerman	23	(1)
2022–2026	Aluminium Arak	92	(1)
2026–	Zob Ahan	9	(0)

International career
2008–2011	Iran U17		
2011–2012	Iran U20	18	(4)
- * Club domestic league appearances and goals as of 1 November 2024

Amin Jahan Kohan (Persian: امین جهان‌کهن; born 7 March 1993) is an Iranian football midfielder who plays for the Iranian club Zob Ahan.

== Club career ==
=== Foolad ===
Jahan Kohan started his career with Foolad Academy. In winter 2011, he was placed on the first team by Majid Jalali. He made his debut for Foolad on 11 January 2012 against Mes Sarcheshmeh as a substitute for Hakim Nassari. In summer 2014 he joined Fajr Sepasi to spend his conscription period. In summer 2015 he moved to Malvan to continue his conscription in Persian Gulf Pro League. In winter 2016 he rejoined Foolad and #28 assigned for him.

== Club career statistics ==
As of 10 March 2016

Club	Division	Season	League		Hazfi Cup		Asia		Total	
Club	Division	Season	Apps	Goals	Apps	Goals	Apps	Goals	Apps	Goals
Foolad	Pro League	2011–12	4	0	0	0	–	–	4	0
Foolad	Pro League	2012–13	0	0	0	0	–	–	0	0
Foolad	Pro League	2013–14	0	0	0	0	0	0	0	0
Fajr Sepasi	Division 1	2014–15	2	0	0	0	–	–	2	0
Malavan	Pro League	2015–16	0	0	0	0	–	–	0	0
Foolad	Pro League	2015–16	1	0	0	0	–	–	1	0
Career Totals			7	0	0	0	0	0	7	0

== International career ==
=== Youth ===
He played two marches at the 2010 AFC U-16 Championship. He was also part of the U-20 team during the 2012 AFC U-19 Championship.

== Honours ==
Foolad

- Iran Pro League (1): 2013–14
