= Artem Teplov =

Belarusian footballer

Personal information
- Date of birth: 14 October 1992 (age 34)
- Place of birth: Novopolotsk, Belarus
- Position: Defender

Youth career
- 2007–2010: Naftan Novopolotsk

Senior career*
Years	Team	Apps	(Gls)
2011–2018	Naftan Novopolotsk	135	(10)
2019	Smorgon	15	(0)

International career
2012	Belarus U21	7	(3)
- * Club domestic league appearances and goals as of 31 December 2019

Artem Teplov (Belarusian: Арцём Цяплоў; Russian: Артём Теплов; born 14 October 1992) is a Belarusian former footballer.

In July 2020 Teplov was found guilty of being involved in a match-fixing schema in Belarusian football. He was sentenced to two years of community service and banned from Belarusian football for one year.

== Honours ==
Naftan Novopolotsk

- Belarusian Cup winner: 2011–12
