= Gints Freimanis =

Latvian footballer (1985–2023)

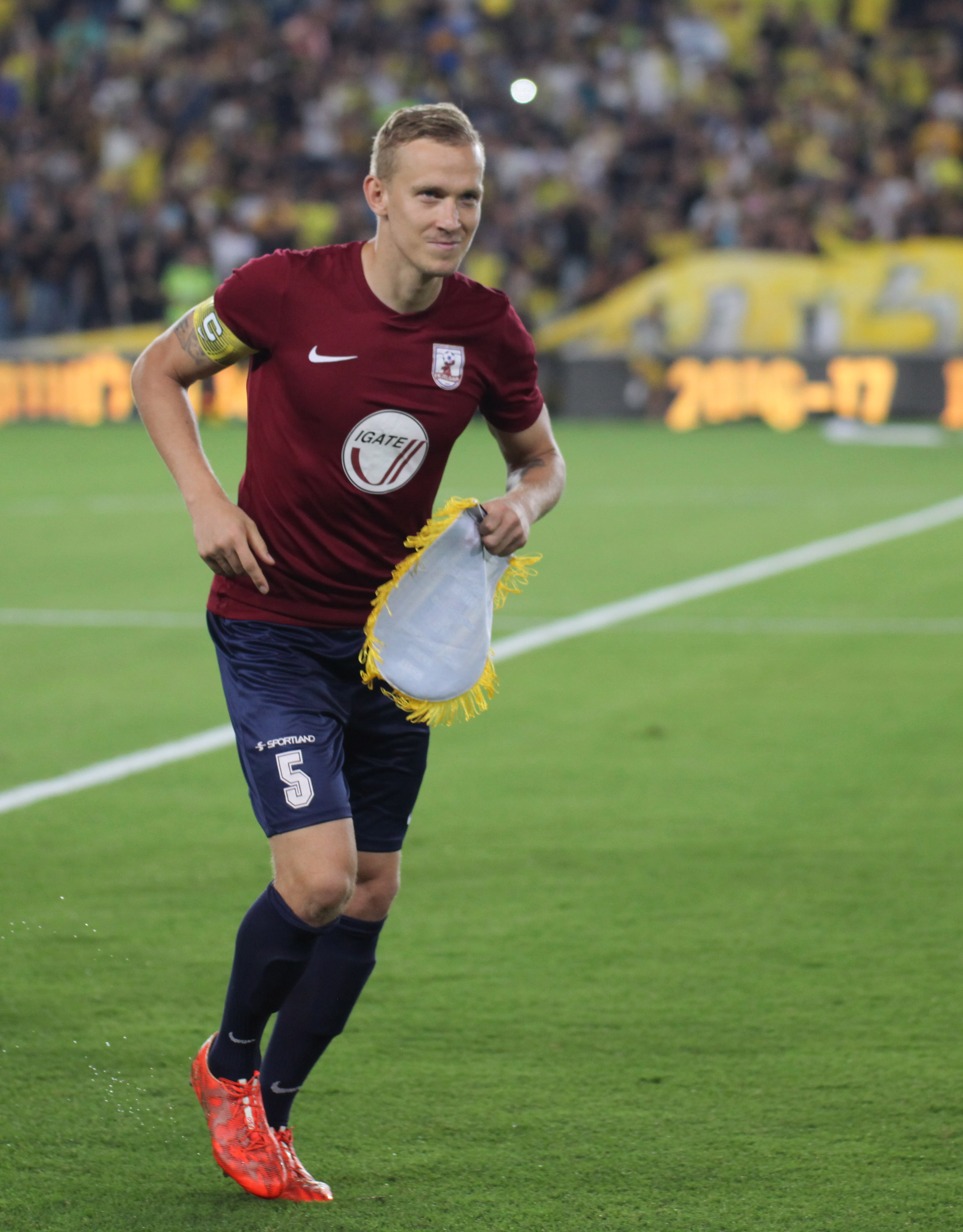
- Freimanis playing for Jelgava in 2016

Personal information
- Date of birth: 9 May 1985
- Place of birth: Saldus, Latvian SSR, USSR
- Date of death: 6 June 2023 (aged 38)
- Height: 1.85 m (6 ft 1 in)
- Position: Right-back

Youth career
- Viola

Senior career*
Years	Team	Apps	(Gls)
2005	Ventspils	0	(0)
2006	Dižvanagi	13	(0)
2006–2007	Jelgava	20	(11)
2007	Jūrmala	16	(1)
2008	Rīga	13	(1)
2009	St Patrick's Athletic	2	(0)
2010–2011	Jelgava	28	(1)
2012	Pommern Greifswald	24	(2)
2013–2018	Jelgava	110	(2)
2018–2020	Spartaks Jūrmala	51	(2)
2020–2022	Leevon Saldus	34	(1)
Total		310	(21)

International career
2014–2018	Latvia	13	(1)
- * Club domestic league appearances and goals

Gints Freimanis (9 May 1985 – 6 June 2023) was a Latvian professional footballer who played as a right-back.

== Club career ==
Freimanis joined Leevon Saldus in 2020.

== International career ==
Freimanis first call-up to the senior Latvia national team squad came in May 2014 for the 2014 Baltic Cup, making his national team debut as a 94th-minute substitute in the final game against Lithuania, helping Latvia to win the trophy by a 1–0 scoreline.

== Illness and death ==
Freimanis was diagnosed with skin cancer in October 2021. He died on 6 June 2023, at the age of 38.

== Career statistics ==
Scores and results list Latvia's goal tally first, score column indicates score after each Freimanis goal.

List of international goals scored by Gints Freimanis
No.	Date	Venue	Opponent	Score	Result	Competition
1	31 August 2017	Groupama Arena, Budapest, Hungary	Hungary	1–2	1–3	2018 FIFA World Cup qualification

== Honours ==
FK Jelgava

- Latvian Football Cup: 2009–10, 2013–14, 2014–15, 2015–16

Latvia

- Baltic Cup: 2014, 2016

Individual

- Best defender of 2016 Latvian Higher League
