= Kennedy Eriba =

Nigerian footballer (born 1990)

Personal information
- Full name: Kennedy Okwe Eriba
- Date of birth: 21 December 1990 (age 35)
- Place of birth: Jos, Nigeria
- Height: 1.80 m (5 ft 11 in)
- Position: Midfielder

Youth career
- Mighty Jets

Senior career*
Years	Team	Apps	(Gls)
2006–2012	Wikki Tourists		
2012–2013	TPS Turku	36	(1)
2012	→ Åbo IFK (loan)	1	(0)
2014–2016	FK Jelgava	37	(4)
2016	→ Stumbras (loan)	18	(2)

International career
2006–2007	Nigeria U17	8	(1)
2008–2009	Nigeria U20	5	(0)
- * Club domestic league appearances and goals

Kennedy Okwe Eriba (born 21 December 1990) is a Nigerian former professional footballer who plays as a midfielder.

== Career ==
Born in Jos, Eriba began his career with Mighty Jets where he played youth football for a few years before being scouted by Wikki Tourists in the Nigeria Premier League, with whom he signed his first professional contract. In August 2008 Eriba had trials with Anderlecht of Belgian Pro League. Shortly after it was reported in the media that Eriba had signed for Anderlecht, however it was later that the Belgium giants and representatives of the player had financial disagreements which led to the deal being canceled. In March 2012 the attacking midfielder signed with Veikkausliiga side TPS Turku and played his debut match for the club on 15 April 2012 against MYPA. He played five matches for TPS, before joining Åbo IFK on a one-month loan. During the short loan spell Eriba played his only match for Åbo IFK on 9 June 2012 against Ekenäs Idrottsförening. Eriba returned to TPS and played 15 matches till November 2012. In his second Veikkausliiga season for TPS Eriba played thirteen games, leaving the club at the end of the season. In July 2014 Eriba signed a one-year contract with the Latvian Higher League club FK Jelgava. He finished the season, having participated in 15 league matches and scored 2 goals as well as played at the UEFA Europa League qualification first-round against Rosenborg BK. Eriba helped FK Jelgava attain the bronze medals of the domestic championship and extended his contract for two more years in December 2014.

== International career ==
Eriba was a member of the Nigerian under-20 squad that qualified for the African Youth Championship in Rwanda in 2009. He was also listed in the squad for the African Youth Championship itself but was ruled out of competition due to an ankle injury.

== Honours ==
TPS Turku

- Finnish League Cup: 2012
