= Ņikita Kovaļonoks =

Latvian footballer

Personal information
- Date of birth: 2 July 1995 (age 31)
- Place of birth: Rīga, Latvia
- Height: 1.95 m (6 ft 5 in)
- Position: Forward

Team information
- Current team: Dordoi Bishkek
- Number: 47

Senior career*
| Years | Team | Apps | (Gls) |
| –2013 | Skonto FC | 0 | (0) |
| 2013–2014 | ADO Den Haag | 0 | (0) |
| 2014–2015 | VUC | | |
| 2015–2016 | VFC Plauen | 17 | (1) |
| 2016–2017 | FK RFS | 6 | (0) |
| 2018–2019 | FK Metta | 29 | (1) |
| 2019–2020 | FK Dinamo Rīga | 10 | (7) |
| 2020–2021 | Stomil Olsztyn | 5 | (0) |
| 2021 | FK Dinamo Rīga | 10 | (0) |
| 2021 | Lincoln Red Imps | 0 | (0) |
| 2021–2022 | FK Dinamo Rīga | 10 | (0) |
| 2022–2023 | Città di Teramo | | |
| 2023 | Nissa | | |
| 2024 | Nuova Sondrio | | |
| 2024– | Dordoi Bishkek | | |
- * Club domestic league appearances and goals as of 2 July 2024

Ņikita Kovaļonoks (born 2 July 1995) is a Latvian professional footballer who plays as a forward for Kyrgyz club Dordoi Bishkek.

== Career ==
On 26 May 2013, after Kovaļonoks was substituted off during a Skonto reserve game, his father almost got into a fistfight with the head coach.

In 2013, after trialing for Dutch top flight clubs Vitesse, Ajax, and NAC Breda, he signed for another Eredivisie, ADO Den Haag, playing for their youth teams before joining Dutch lower league side VUC.

In 2015, Kovaļonoks signed for VFC Plauen in the NOFV-Oberliga Süd, the fifth tier of German football.

In 2020, he signed for Polish second division outfit Stomil Olsztyn after playing for FK Dinamo Rīga in the Latvian second division.

In July 2021, he joined Gibraltar National League side Lincoln Red Imps, making his debut on 6 July 2021 in the 2021–22 UEFA Champions League qualifying match against CS Fola Esch.
