= Oleksiy Cheremysin =

Ukrainian footballer

Oleksii Cheremisin
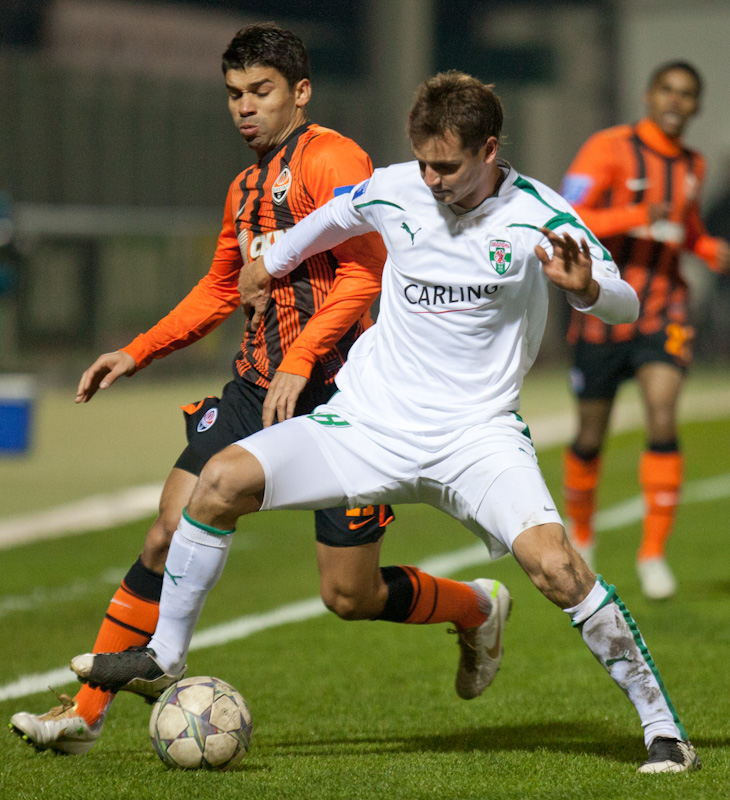

Personal information
- Full name: Oleksii Volodymyrovich Cheremisin
- Date of birth: 4 January 1991 (age 35)
- Place of birth: Kyiv, Ukrainian SSR
- Height: 1.88 m (6 ft 2 in)
- Position: Defender

Youth career
- 2004–2008: FC Dynamo Kyiv

Senior career*
Years	Team	Apps	(Gls)
2008–2009	FC Dynamo Kyiv	0	(0)
2009–2013	FC Obolon Kyiv	5	(0)
2010	→ FC Dynamo Khmelnytskyi (loan)	10	(0)
2012–2013	→ FC Obolon-2 Kyiv	14	(0)
2013	FC Olimpik Donetsk	7	(0)
2013–2014	FC Obolon-Brovar Kyiv	23	(0)
2014	FC Zirka Kirovohrad	1	(0)
2015	FK Slavoj Vyšehrad	6	(0)

International career^{‡}
2012	Ukraine-21	6	(1)
- * Club domestic league appearances and goals as of 4 December 2015 ‡ National team caps and goals as of 4 December 2015

Oleksiі Cheremisin (Ukrainian: Олексій Володимирович Черемісін; born 4 January 1991) is a Ukrainian former professional football defender.

Cheremisin is a product of the youth team systems of FC Dynamo Kyiv. He did not play in the first Dynamo's team and signed a contract with FC Obolon in 2009.

He was called up to play for the Ukraine national under-21 football team by trainer Pavlo Yakovenko to the Commonwealth Cup in 2012.
