= Boriss Bogdaškins =

Latvian footballer (born 1990)

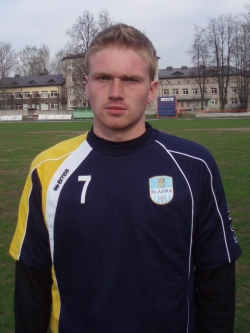
- Bogdaškins in 2009

Personal information
- Full name: Boriss Bogdaškins
- Date of birth: 21 February 1990 (age 36)
- Place of birth: Riga, Latvian SSR, Soviet Union
- Height: 1.82 m (6 ft 0 in)
- Position: Midfielder

Senior career*
Years	Team	Apps	(Gls)
2008–2010	Blāzma		
2010–2017	Jelgava	176	(17)
2017–2019	Riga	27	(0)
2019–2020	Valmiera	30	(2)
2020	Tukums 2000	16	(0)
2020–2021	Jelgava	7	(1)
2021	Ventspils	4	(0)

International career^{‡}
2011–2012	Latvia U21	5	(0)
2019–	Latvia	1	(0)
- * Club domestic league appearances and goals as of 09:45, 3 October 2021 (UTC) ‡ National team caps and goals as of 12:46, 7 September 2019 (UTC)

Boriss Bogdaškins (born 21 February 1990) is a Latvian footballer who plays as a midfielder.

== Career ==
Bogdaškins made his international debut for Latvia on 6 September 2019 in a UEFA Euro 2020 qualifying match against Austria, which finished as a 0–6 away loss.

== Career statistics ==
=== International ===
As of 6 September 2019

Latvia
Year	Apps	Goals
2019	1	0
Total	1	0
