= Ndue Mujeci =

Albanian footballer

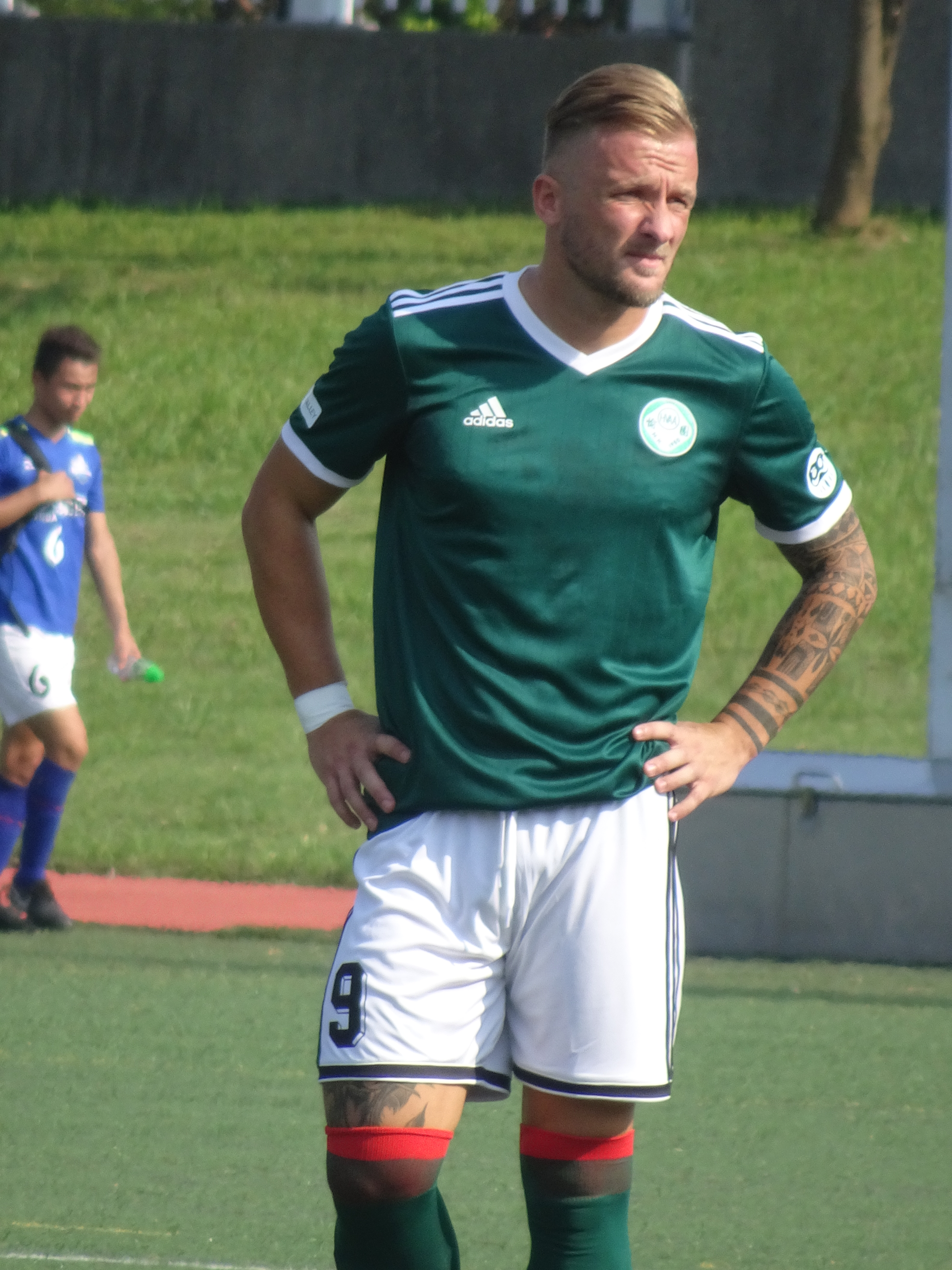
- Mujeci with Happy Valley in 2018

Personal information
- Date of birth: 24 February 1993 (age 33)
- Place of birth: Shkodër, Albania
- Height: 1.81 m (5 ft 11 1/2 in)
- Position: Forward

Team information
- Current team: North Sunshine Eagles

Youth career
- –2012: Vllaznia Shkodër

Senior career*
| Years | Team | Apps | (Gls) |
| 2011–2012 | Vllaznia Shkodër | 2 | (1) |
| 2012–2013 | Ada Velipojë | 44 | (7) |
| 2014–2016 | Ventspils | 64 | (23) |
| 2016–2017 | Pirin Blagoevgrad | 11 | (0) |
| 2017 | Dunav Ruse | 15 | (1) |
| 2017–2018 | Saburtalo | 18 | (2) |
| 2018 | Gençlik Gücü | 17 | (13) |
| 2018–2019 | Happy Valley | 24 | (29) |
| 2019 | Cihangir | 16 | (9) |
| 2020 | Akademija Pandev | 5 | (0) |
| 2020–2022 | Jezero | 44 | (10) |
| 2022 | Liria Prizren | | |
| 2022–2023 | Göcmenköy | 11 | (2) |
| 2023 | Dandenong Thunder | 7 | (0) |
| 2024– | North Sunshine Eagles | | |
- * Club domestic league appearances and goals as of 11:00, 9 September 2021 (UTC)

Ndue Mujeci (born 24 February 1993 in Shkodër) is an Albanian professional footballer who currently plays as a forward for North Sunshine Eagles.

== Club career ==
In August 2016, Mujeci joined Bulgarian club Pirin Blagoevgrad but was released in January.

On 5 January 2017, he signed a 1 1/2 year contract with fellow Bulgarian club Dunav Ruse. He was released in June 2017.

On 14 July 2017, Mujeci signed a 1-year contract with Georgian Premier League side Saburtalo.

On 23 January 2018, he signed a 6-month contract with Northern Cyprus club Gençlik Gücü.

On 17 August 2018, Mujeci arrived in Hong Kong to sign a contract with Hong Kong First Division club Happy Valley.

On 11 September 2019, Mujeci signed with Northern Cypriot club Cihangir. In January 2020, he then moved to Akademija Pandev in North Macedonia, before joining Montenegrin First League club FK Jezero in September 2020.

== Honours ==
=== Club ===
Ventspils

- Latvian League: 2014

Happy Valley

- Hong Kong First Division: 2018–19
