= Ēriks Punculs =

Latvian footballer

Personal information
- Date of birth: 18 January 1994 (age 32)
- Place of birth: Riga, Latvia
- Height: 1.84 m (6 ft 0 in)
- Position: Forward

Team information
- Current team: Valmiera
- Number: 9

Senior career*
| Years | Team | Apps | (Gls) |
| 2011–2012 | Liepājas Metalurgs | 1 | (0) |
| 2012–2014 | Ciudad de Plasencia | | |
| 2014–2016 | Spartaks Jūrmala | 51 | (8) |
| 2016 | FS METTA/LU | 8 | (0) |
| 2016–2018 | Riga | 37 | (4) |
| 2018–2019 | Liepāja | 10 | (1) |
| 2019– | Valmiera | 71 | (13) |

International career^{‡}
| 2010–2011 | Latvia U17 | 6 | (2) |
| 2012 | Latvia U19 | 2 | (0) |
| 2019– | Latvia | 2 | (0) |
- * Club domestic league appearances and goals as of 1 January 2022 ‡ National team caps and goals as of 23:23, 20 February 2022 (UTC)

Ēriks Punculs (born 18 January 1994) is a Latvian professional footballer who plays as a forward for Valmiera and the Latvia national team.

== Career ==
Punculs made his international debut for Latvia on 9 September 2019 in a UEFA Euro 2020 qualifying match against North Macedonia, which finished as a 0–2 away loss.

== Career statistics ==
As of 9 September 2019

Appearances and goals by national team and year
| National team | Year | Apps | Goals |
|---|---|---|---|
| Latvia | 2019 | 1 | 0 |
| Total | | 1 | 0 |
