= Latvian Supercup =

- Organiser(s): Latvian Football Federation
- Founded: 2013
- Region: Latvia
- Teams: 2
- Current champions: Riga FC
- Most championships: FC Daugava and Riga FC (1 each)
- Website: LFF Website
- 2024 Latvian Supercup

The Latvian Supercup (Latvian: Latvijas Superkauss) is a one-match annual football competition. The two participating clubs are holders of the Latvian Higher League champions title and the Latvian Football Cup. The fixture is played before the start of the season.

The first at so far only Supercup game was held in 2013, when Daugava defeated Skonto at Celtnieks Stadium in Daugavpils. SInce 2014, the competition has been suspended.

In June 2020, the Latvian Football Federation said it plans to revive the competition, naming it after the late coach Jānis Skredelis, either in the summer of 2020 or 2021.

== Winners ==
Key
†	Winner won after extra time
§	Winner by penalties
*	Winner of Latvian Higher League
‡	Winner of Latvian Football Cup
●	Double-winner

Latvian Supercup matches
Year	Winner	Score	Runner-up	Venue	City	Attendance
2013	Daugava*	4–1	Skonto^{‡}	Celtnieks Stadium	Daugavpils	600
2014	Canceled					
2015–2020	Competition suspended					
2024	Riga FC*§	1–1 (5–4 pen.)	FK RFS^{‡}	LNK Sporta Parks	Riga	535
2025	FK RFS^{●}	3–1	Riga FC	LNK Sporta Parks	Riga	420
2026	Riga FC	4–1	FK Auda	Mardan Sports Complex	Antalya	134

== See also ==
- Football in Latvia
- Latvia national football team
- Latvian Higher League
- Latvian Football Cup
