= Visvaldis Ignatāns =

Latvian footballer

Personal information
- Date of birth: 3 August 1991 (age 35)
- Place of birth: Daugavpils, Latvian SSR, Soviet Union (now Republic of Latvia)
- Height: 1.76 m (5 ft 9 in)
- Position: Midfielder

Youth career
- FK Ventspils-2

Senior career*
Years	Team	Apps	(Gls)
2007–2015	FK Ventspils	47	(9)
2009	→ Tranzīts Ventspils (loan)	12	(1)
2011	→ FK Jelgava (loan)	5	(0)
2014	→ Daugava Daugavpils (loan)	12	(4)
Total		76	(14)

International career
2007–2008	Latvia U17	3	(0)
2009–2010	Latvia U19	5	(2)
2011	Latvia U21	1	(0)
2014	Latvia	1	(0)
- * Club domestic league appearances and goals

Visvaldis Ignatāns (born 3 August 1991) is a Latvian former professional footballer who played as a midfielder.. He made one appearance for the Latvia national football team.

== Club career ==
Born in Daugavpils, Ignatāns started playing football in his home city under his first coach Genādijs Pašins. As a teenager he moved to the other side of the country, joining FK Ventspils academy. Ignatāns has been playing for the club ever since, debuting in the first team in 2007. During the first three professional seasons with FK Ventspils Ignatāns played five league matches, being loaned to Tranzīts Ventspils in 2009. He scored his first Latvian Higher League goal in a 2–1 loss to Dinaburg Daugavpils on 17 September 2009. Despite the limited playing time, Ignatāns helped FK Ventspils become the champions of Latvia in 2007 and 2008, as well as win the 2007 Latvian Cup. On 4 July 2010 they also won the Baltic League, beating Sūduva Marijampolė in the final on penalties. In July 2011 Ignatāns was loaned to FK Jelgava in order to preserve playing practice. Ignatāns made his breakthrough at FK Ventspils at the end of the 2013 season. With three goals in twelve matches he became a first eleven player and helped his club lift both – the league and the cup trophies. He started the 2014 season with a substantial role in the midfield position and netted three goals in seventeen league matches. Following his first call-up to the national team for the 2014 Baltic Cup matches, Ignatāns and a few other players were blamed for attitude issues by FK Ventspils manager Jurģis Pučinskis. Following a minor conflict between the involved parties in July 2014, Ignatāns was loaned to Daugava Daugavpils alongside his teammates Oļegs Žatkins and Edgars Vērdiņš. During the loan spell he scored 5 goals in 11 league matches for Daugava, being widely praised for his overall performance and long distance shots.

== International career ==
Ignatāns was a member of Latvia U-17, Latvia U-19 and Latvia U-21 football teams. Following the promising performance at the end of 2013 and the beginning of 2014, he was firstly called-up to Latvia national football team by the manager Marians Pahars for the 2014 Baltic Cup matches. Ignatāns made his debut in the semi-finals victory over Estonia, coming on as a substitute in the 77th minute and replacing Andrejs Kovaļovs.

== Honours ==
- Latvian Higher League champion: 2007, 2008, 2013
- Latvian Cup winner: 2007, 2010–11, 2012–13
- Baltic League champion: 2009–10
- Baltic Cup winner: 2014
