= Alans Siņeļņikovs =

Latvian footballer (born 1990)

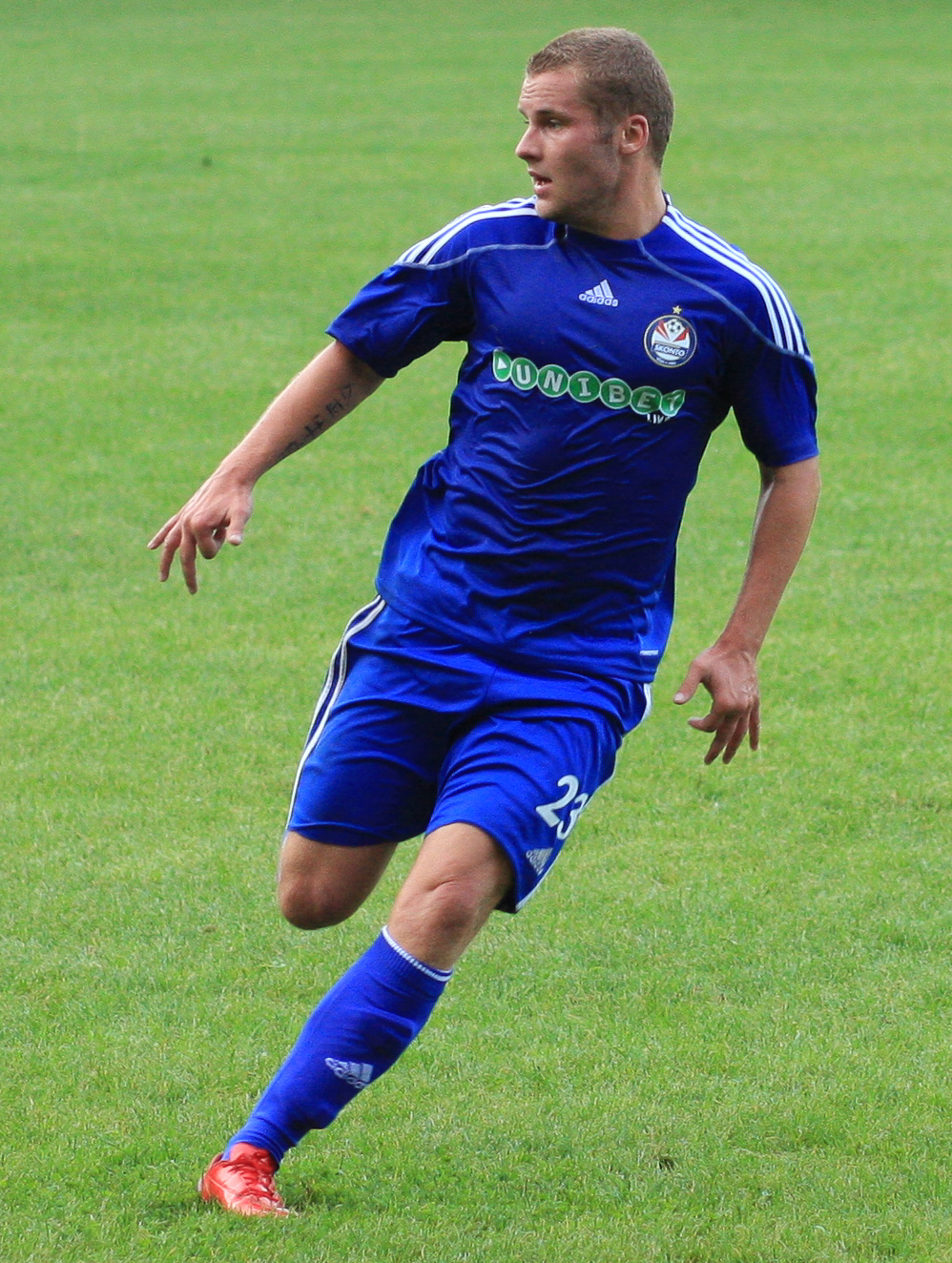
- Alans Siņeļņikovs playing for Skonto

Personal information
- Full name: Alans Siņeļņikovs
- Date of birth: 14 May 1990 (age 36)
- Place of birth: Riga, Latvian SSR, Soviet Union (now Republic of Latvia)
- Height: 1.79 m (5 ft 10 in)
- Positions: Defender; midfielder

Youth career
- JFC Skonto

Senior career*
Years	Team	Apps	(Gls)
2007–2013	Skonto Riga	100	(21)
2007–2009	→ JFK Olimps (loan)	39	(0)
2014	Baník Ostrava	0	(0)
2014–2016	Ventspils	50	(6)
2017–2018	Jelgava	31	(2)
2019–2020	Rīgas FS	12	(0)
2020	Jelgava	4	(0)
2020–2021	Noah Jūrmala	19	(2)

International career^{‡}
2009–2012	Latvia U-21	17	(0)
2012–	Latvia	11	(1)
- * Club domestic league appearances and goals as of 18 February 2019 ‡ National team caps and goals as of 16 November 2017

Alans Siņeļņikovs (born 14 May 1990) is a Latvian footballer.

== Club career ==
=== Early career ===
Siņeļņikovs was born in Riga. As a youth player he played for his local club JFC Skonto, being a member of the Skonto Riga academy. Before the start of the 2007 season he was taken to the first team, but in August the same year was eventually loaned out to another Latvian Higher League club JFK Olimps to get more playing practice. Siņeļņikovs spent three seasons on loan at the club with a short return to Skonto at the start of 2009 to participate in the 2009 Turkmenistan President's Cup, where Skonto managed to reach the final of the tournament. Afterwards Siņeļņikovs was yet again given out on loan to Olimps for the remaining term of half a year. Throughout the three seasons the youngster made 39 Latvian Higher League appearances and also participated in the 2008-09 UEFA Cup qualification matches against St Patrick's Athletic.

=== Skonto Riga ===
Before the start of the 2010 season Siņeļņikovs was one of several players to be brought into the Skonto squad by the newly appointed manager Aleksandrs Starkovs. Soon he established himself as a first eleven player, making 25 league appearances and scoring 6 goals in his full debut season at the club. Siņeļņikovs helped Skonto become the champions of Latvia for the first time since 2004. In 2011 Siņeļņikovs scored 5 goals in 22 league matches and despite finishing the domestic championship in the 4th place, helped Skonto win the Baltic League, beating another Latvian side FK Ventspils in the final. In 2012 Siņeļņikovs became the winner of the Latvian Football Cup and scored 8 goals in 28 league matches, reaching his individual goal scoring record per season so far. In 2013 the newly appointed manager Tamaz Pertia retrained Siņeļņikovs and started utilizing him as a left-back, therefore, he scored only 2 goals in 22 league appearances. Skonto became the runners-up of the league for the second season in a row. After the season Siņeļņikovs was granted a free agent's status by the Latvian Football Federation, which he asked due to a long-term delay of salary payment, with Skonto struggling financially.

=== Baník Ostrava ===
In January 2014 Siņeļņikovs went on trial with the Czech Gambrinus Liga club Baník Ostrava and signed a contract with them on 25 January 2014 for one season with an option to extend it for another season and a half. In late February 2014, not having yet made his debut at the club, Siņeļņikovs suffered a rupture of cruciate ligament and damaged his meniscus, with the full recovery period expected to be at least six months.

=== FK Ventspils ===
In July 2014 Siņeļņikovs left Banik Ostrava to sign for the Latvian Higher League title holders FK Ventspils as a free agent. Having fully recovered from the long-term injury, he symbolically came on to play 15 minutes in the last round of the tournament and saw his club retain the league title for the second year in a row.

=== RFS ===
At the end of December 2018, Siņeļņikovs signed for FK Rīgas Futbola Skola.

== International career ==
From 2009 to 2012 Siņeļņikovs was a member of Latvia national under-21 football team, playing 17 international matches. He made his debut for Latvia at full international level on 22 May 2012 in a friendly match against Poland, coming on as a substitute in the 87th minute and replacing Oļegs Laizāns. As of August 2014, Siņeļņikovs has played 11 international matches with his first goal yet to come.

=== International goals ===
Scores and results list Latvia's goal tally first.

No	Date	Venue	Opponent	Score	Result	Competition
1.	13 November 2017	Adem Jashari Olympic Stadium, Mitrovica, Kosovo	Kosovo	3–2	3–4	Friendly

== Honours ==
=== Club ===
Skonto Riga

- Latvian Higher League: 2010
- Baltic League: 2011
- Latvian Cup: 2012

FK Ventspils

- Latvian Higher League: 2014

=== International ===
- Baltic Cup: 2012
