= Edgars Vardanjans =

Latvian footballer

Personal information
- Date of birth: 9 May 1993 (age 33)
- Place of birth: Yerevan, Armenia
- Height: 1.76 m (5 ft 9 in)
- Position: Midfielder

Youth career
- FK Multibanka Rīga

Senior career*
Years	Team	Apps	(Gls)
2010–2016	FK Metta	165	(12)
2017–2019	FK Spartaks Jūrmala	47	(3)
2020	FK Liepaja	3	(0)

International career^{‡}
2010	Latvia U17	6	(0)
2011–2012	Latvia U19	10	(2)
2012–2014	Latvia U21	27	(1)
2017–	Latvia	4	(0)
- * Club domestic league appearances and goals as of 7 November 2017 ‡ National team caps and goals as of 24 October 2017

Edgars Vardanjans (Armenian: Էդգար Վարդանյան; born 9 May 1993) is a Latvian former football player who retired due to injury.

== International ==
He made his debut for Latvia national football team on 9 June 2017 in a World Cup qualifier against Portugal.
