= Vladislavs Kozlovs =

Latvian footballer

Personal information
- Full name: Vladislavs Kozlovs
- Date of birth: 30 November 1987 (age 38)
- Place of birth: Rēzekne, Latvian SSR, Soviet Union (now Republic of Latvia)
- Height: 1.85 m (6 ft 1 in)
- Position: Forward

Youth career
- 2003–2004: BSK Dižvanagi

Senior career*
Years	Team	Apps	(Gls)
2005–2006	SK Dižvanagi	23	(1)
2007–2009	FS Metta-Latvijas Universitāte	57	(13)
2010–2012	FK Jelgava	71	(28)
2012–2013	FK Ventspils	32	(3)
2014	FK Jelgava	34	(15)
2015	FC Infonet	27	(12)
2016–2018	FK Spartaks Jūrmala	41	(8)
2018	FK Jelgava	19	(4)
2019	FK Liepāja	6	(0)

International career
2010–2012	Latvia	3	(0)
- * Club domestic league appearances and goals as of 22:18, 10 July 2019 (UTC)

Vladislavs Kozlovs (born 30 November 1987 in Rēzekne) is a Latvian footballer, who most recently played for FK Liepaja in the Latvian Higher League.

== Club career ==
=== Early career ===
As a youth player Kozlovs played for his local club SK Dižvanagi (later renamed SK Blāzma), after being spotted by coaches Ž. Ārmanis and E. Seleckis in a youth tournament. He was taken to the first team that played in the Latvian First League in 2005. Kozlovs spent one season in Rēzekne, before moving to Riga after graduation from high-school in 2006. He continued studying in Latvijas Universitāte and played for the high-school team Metta-Latvijas Universitāte. Kozlovs had 3 successful seasons in the Latvian First League with them, playing there until 2010.

=== FK Jelgava ===
In 2010 the starlet was spotted by the Latvian Higher League newcomers FK Jelgava, as they signed a contract with him before the start of the season. Kozlovs proved his abilities soon and scored 6 goals in 25 league matches in his first season in the Latvian Higher League. He managed to win the Latvian Cup, as well as made a margin in FK Jelgava history in a friendly match against Blackpool as the first player to score a goal against a club from the Premier League, as well as the first player to score a goal in the club's new stadium – Zemgales Olimpiskais Sporta Centrs. In the 2011 season Kozlovs scored 16 goals in 31 league appearances, being the club's top scorer as well as the third top-scorer of the league. He was also named the best player of the league in June. Kozlovs started the 2012 season well, scoring 6 goals in 15 matches and being his team's top scorer.

=== FK Ventspils ===
On 4 July 2012 Kozlovs joined the Latvian Higher League club FK Ventspils. He played there for 2 seasons, making 32 league appearances and scoring 3 goals. In August 2013 Kozlovs left Ventspils due to family reasons after a mutual agreement.

=== Return to FK Jelgava ===
Before the start of the 2014 Latvian Higher League, on 19 January, Kozlovs made an official return to his former club FK Jelgava. Filling the vacant forward's place in the first eleven he quickly made an impact as Jelgava managed to reach the bronze medals of the Latvian championship for the first time in the club's history. With 15 goals in 34 matches Kozlovs became the third best scorer of the championship behind the Skonto FC forward Vladislavs Gutkovskis and FK Liepāja midfielder Jānis Ikaunieks. On 21 May 2014 Kozlovs helped Jelgava win the Latvian Football Cup, beating Skonto on penalties. In July the club participated in the first round of the UEFA Europa League qualification, ceding to the Norwegian club Rosenborg BK.

=== FC Infonet ===
At end of January 2015 Kozlovs went on trial with the Belarusian Premier League club Naftan Novopolotsk. In February it was reported that he had signed a one-year deal with the Estonian Meistriliiga club FC Infonet.

=== FK Liepāja ===
Kozlovs joined FK Liepāja in January 2019. He left in June 2019.

== International career ==
Kozlovs made his debut for Latvia in a friendly match against China on 17 November 2010, coming on as a substitute in the 76th minute. In June 2012 Kozlovs was called up for the 2012 Baltic Cup squad. He scored the decisive penalty in the final against Finland, helping Latvia win the tournament. As of 2015, Kozlovs has 3 caps under his belt, with the last international match being played back in 2012.

== Personal life ==
Vladislavs Kozlovs has a bachelor's degree in finance and crediting. According to fk jelgava.lv, his hobbies include cars. Kozlovs' aim in football is to develop and improve. He has a Facebook account.

== Honours ==
FK Jelgava

- Latvian Cup winner: (2) 2010, 2014

FK Ventspils

- Latvian Cup winner: (1) 2013

National team

- Baltic Cup winner: (1) 2012
