= Ņikita Ivanovs =

Latvian footballer

Personal information
- Date of birth: 25 March 1996 (age 30)
- Height: 1.86 m (6 ft 1 in)
- Position: Striker

Team information
- Current team: Jelgava

Senior career*
Years	Team	Apps	(Gls)
2013–2015	Skonto FC	35	(8)
2016	FK RFS	9	(1)
2017–2018	Metta / LU	42	(6)
2019–	Jelgava	1	(0)

International career^{‡}
- Latvia U21
2018–	Latvia	1	(0)
- * Club domestic league appearances and goals as of 16:15, 18 March 2019 (UTC) ‡ National team caps and goals as of 15:00, 23 January 2019 (UTC)

Ņikita Ivanovs (born 25 March 1996) is a Latvian international footballer who plays for FK Jelgava, as a striker.

== Career ==
He has played club football for Skonto FC, FK RFS and FS METTA/Latvijas Universitāte.

After playing for the Latvian under-21 team, he made his international debut for the Latvia in 2018.

Ivanovs joined FK Jelgava for the 2019 season.
