= Gļebs Kļuškins =

Latvian footballer (born 1992)

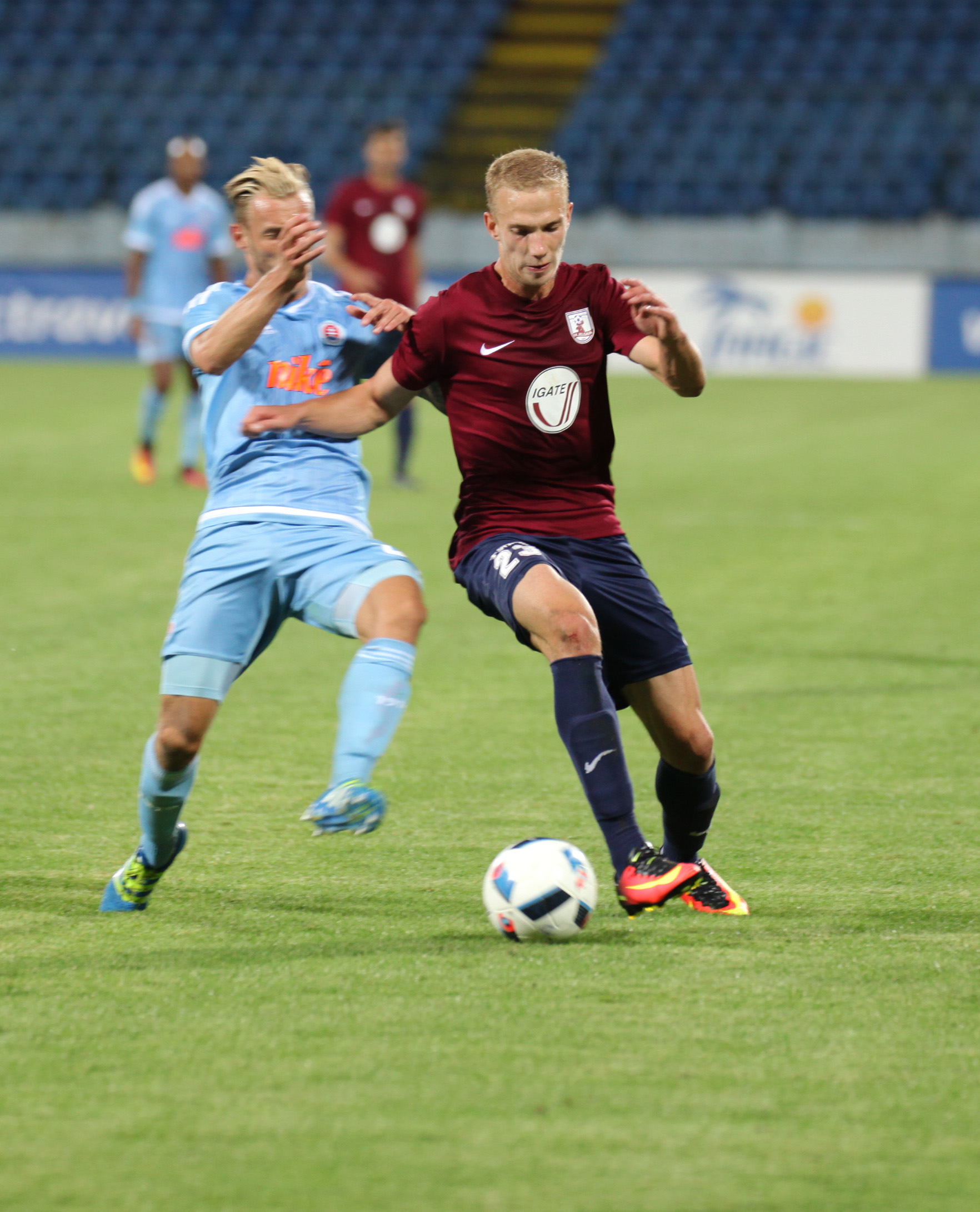
- Kļuškins (in red) playing for Jelgava in 2016

Personal information
- Full name: Gļebs Kļuškins
- Date of birth: 1 October 1992 (age 34)
- Place of birth: Riga, Latvia
- Height: 1.85 m (6 ft 1 in)
- Position: Midfielder

Team information
- Current team: Grobiņa
- Number: 32

Youth career
- 2009–2012: Rīgas FS

Senior career*
Years	Team	Apps	(Gls)
2009	Daugava Rīga	2	(0)
2010–2012	Rīgas FS	11	(3)
2012–2014	Daugava Rīga	45	(4)
2015–2017	Jelgava	60	(14)
2018–2019	Rīgas FS	19	(5)
2020	Sūduva	15	(0)
2021	Noah Jūrmala	0	(0)
2021–2022	Metta	18	(3)
2022–2023	Liepāja	25	(4)
2024	Jelgava	30	(2)
2025–	Grobiņa	48	(2)

International career^{‡}
2012–2014	Latvia U-21	4	(0)
2013–	Latvia	19	(2)
- * Club domestic league appearances and goals as of 12 November 2026 ‡ National team caps and goals as of 18:38, 19 October 2022 (UTC)

Gļebs Kļuškins (born 1 October 1992) is a Latvian footballer, who currently plays as a midfielder for Grobiņa.

== Club career ==
=== Early career ===
As a youth player Kļuškins was a member of the Rīgas FS youth system. He made his top flight debut for FK Daugava Rīga at the age of 17 on 29 August 2009 coming as substitute against Skonto Riga. After spending two seasons at Rīgas FS and playing in Latvian First League, Kļuškins returns at top flight in 2012. His first goal in Latvian Higher League comes on September 30, 2012, against FC Jurmala when Kļuškins scores match winner 3–2 on 84th minute coming as substitute eight minutes earlier.

=== FK Jelgava ===
Kļuškins joined FK Jelgava in March 2015 only one week before the first game of the season. Soon he established himself as a regular starter in the team squad. Kļuškins most remarkable moment of the season came on July 16 when he scored the only goal on 87.minute in FK Jelgava 1–0 win of 2015–16 UEFA Europa League second qualifying round first leg game against Macedonian side FK Rabotnički.

== International career ==
Gļebs Kļuškins first call-up to the senior Latvia national team squad came in May 2013 for the International friendly match against Qatar and he made his national team debut coming as substitute on 75th minute playing away game in Doha on 24 May 2013. His next call came three years later when head coach Marians Pahars on 23 August 2016 selected Gļebs Kļuškins in the squad for friendly game against the Luxembourg and World Cup qualifiers match against Andorra.

=== International goals ===
Scores and results list Latvia's goal tally first.

No	Date	Venue	Opponent	Score	Result	Competition
1.	13 November 2017	Adem Jashari Olympic Stadium, Mitrovica, Kosovo	Kosovo	1–0	3–4	Friendly
2.	13 November 2017	Adem Jashari Olympic Stadium, Mitrovica, Kosovo	Kosovo	3–2	3–4	Friendly

== Career statistics ==
As of 6 June 2017

Club	Season	League		Cup		Europe		Other		Total	
Club	Season	Apps	Goals	Apps	Goals	Apps	Goals	Apps	Goals	Apps	Goals
FK Daugava Rīga	2012	15	2	0	0	–		2	0	17	2
FK Daugava Rīga	2013	25	1	2	1	–		0	0	27	2
FK Daugava Rīga	2014	5	1	1	1	-		0	0	6	2
FK Daugava Rīga	Total	45	4	3	2	0	0	2	0	50	6
Jelgava	2015	19	2	2	0	4	1	0	0	25	3
Jelgava	2016	22	7	5	1	6	2	0	0	33	10
Jelgava	2017	8	2	0	0	0	0	0	0	8	2
Jelgava	Total	49	11	7	1	10	3	0	0	66	15
Career total		94	15	10	3	10	3	2	0	116	21

== Honours ==
FK Jelgava

- Latvian Football Cup (2): 2014–15, 2015–16

Individual

- Best player of 2016 Latvian Higher League
