= Skonto Hall =

Indoor arena in Riga, Latvia

- Skonto Arena
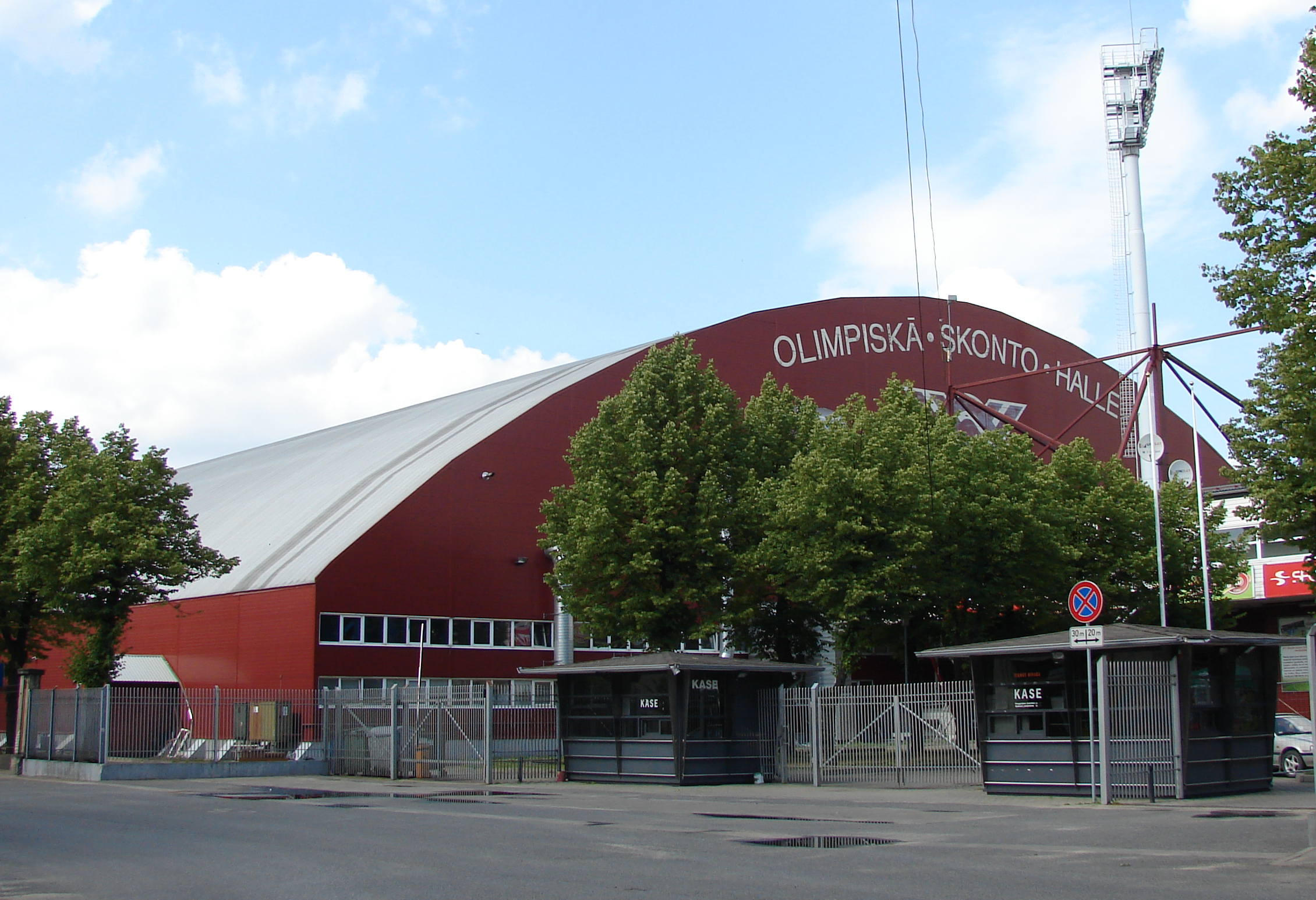
- Interactive map of Skonto Hall
- Full name: Olimpiskā Skonto halle
- Location: Emiļa Melngaiļa iela 1A, Riga, Latvia
- Coordinates: 56°57′43″N 24°6′52″E
- Owner: Halle LV Ltd.
- Capacity: 8,000 (standing); 2,000 (seated)

Construction
- Opened: 1996
- Renovated: 2006, 2010

Tenant
- Skonto FC (2006–2016)

Skonto Hall (Latvian: Skonto halle, also known as Skonto Arena) is an arena in Centrs, Riga, Latvia. In the lobby of Skonto there are conference halls, a gym, and an arena with an artificial football field, which also hosts numerous exhibitions and concerts. The multi-purpose hall was originally built in 1996 and can accommodate either 2,000 seated spectators or 8,000 standing spectators. It is immediately adjacent to Skonto Stadium.

== History ==
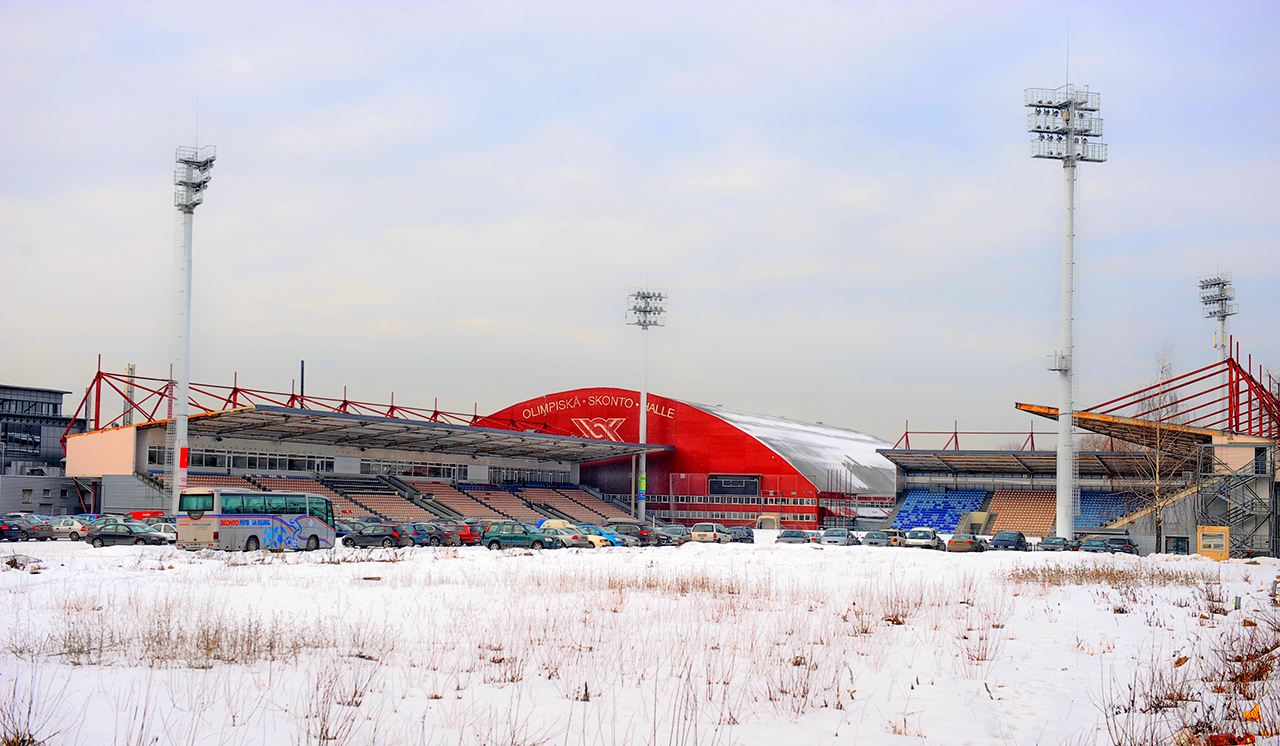
Skonto Stadium and the arena

The Skonto Hall was renovated in early 2006, for its use as one of the venues for the 2006 Men's World Ice Hockey Championships alongside the newly built Arēna Rīga. The hall also hosted the Eurovision Song Contest 2003, with a maximum capacity of 6,500.

After the World Ice Hockey Championships, the arena was the home of Riga basketball club BK Skonto Riga, but it is also used as a conference and congress center.

Due to outstanding loan payments, the hall was taken over by asset management company Reverta in 2011. On 15 October 2013, an auction which included the stadium was planned. At the auction, however, the property was not sold, but on 15 July 2014 it was acquired by SIA "SSA Assets".

== See also ==
- Skonto Stadium
- List of indoor arenas in Latvia

Preceded by Saku Suurhall Arena; Tallinn	Eurovision Song Contest; Venue; 2003	Succeeded by Abdi İpekçi Arena; Istanbul
