= Armands Pētersons =

Latvian footballer (born 1990)

Personal information
- Full name: Armands Pētersons
- Date of birth: 5 December 1990 (age 35)
- Place of birth: Riga, Latvian SSR, Soviet Union
- Height: 1.68 m (5 ft 6 in)
- Position: Midfielder

Team information
- Current team: Jelgava
- Number: 19

Senior career*
Years	Team	Apps	(Gls)
2007–2010	JFK Olimps/RFS	29	(8)
2010–2013	Skonto	53	(5)
2013–2014	Daugava	15	(0)
2014–2015	Jelgava	24	(3)
2015–2016	FS Metta/LU	24	(4)
2016–2023	Riga FC	134	(3)
2023	Auda	2	(0)
2024–	Jelgava	84	(3)

International career^{‡}
2006	Latvia U17	2	(0)
	Latvia U19	6	(1)
2011–2012	Latvia U21	7	(0)
2019	Latvia	2	(0)
- * Club domestic league appearances and goals as of 12 November 2026 ‡ National team caps and goals as of 9 September 2019 (UTC)

Armands Pētersons (born 5 December 1990) is a Latvian footballer who plays as a midfielder for Jelgava and the Latvia national team.

== Career ==
Pētersons made his international debut for Latvia on 6 September 2019 in a UEFA Euro 2020 qualifying match against Austria, which finished as a 0–6 away loss.

== Career statistics ==
=== International ===
As of 9 September 2019

Latvia
Year	Apps	Goals
2019	2	0
Total	2	0
