= Artūrs Karašausks =

Latvian footballer (born 1992)

Personal information
- Date of birth: 29 January 1992 (age 34)
- Place of birth: Riga, Latvia
- Height: 1.78 m (5 ft 10 in)
- Position: Forward

Youth career
- JFC Skonto

Senior career*
Years	Team	Apps	(Gls)
2008–2009	Olimps/RFS	18	(10)
2010–2016	Skonto Riga	67	(32)
2010	→ Dnipro Dnipropetrovsk (loan)	0	(0)
2012	→ FB Gulbene (loan)	15	(1)
2014	→ Rubin Kazan (loan)	0	(0)
2016	→ Piast Gliwice (loan)	2	(0)
2016–2017	Wil	13	(3)
2017–2018	Liepāja	22	(10)
2018	Akzhayik	14	(2)
2019	RFS	0	(0)
2019–2020	Pafos	0	(0)
2019	→ Riga (loan)	13	(0)
2020–2021	Liepāja	29	(13)
2021–2022	Ethnikos Achna	10	(0)
2022	Liepāja	22	(4)
2022–2024	Ypsonas Krasava	54	(28)
2024	Liepāja	8	(1)
2025	Visakha	10	(1)

International career^{‡}
2008–2009	Latvia U17	3	(2)
2009–2010	Latvia U19	6	(1)
2011–2013	Latvia U21	7	(1)
2010–2019	Latvia	25	(1)
- * Club domestic league appearances and goals as of 19 May 2025 ‡ National team caps and goals as of 20 November 2026

Artūrs Karašausks (born 29 January 1992) is a Latvian professional footballer who plays as a forward for Cambodian club Visakha.

== Club career ==
=== Early career ===
Karašausks was born in Riga. As a youth player he was a member of the JFC Skonto academy. He was signed by the Latvian Higher League club JFK Olimps/RFS in January 2009, making his top flight debut at the age of 17. He scored his first goal for the club in a 1–1 league draw against SK Blāzma on 11 June 2009, being just 17 years, 4 months and 17 days old. In less than a month after Karašausks managed to score his first ever hat-trick in a 7–0 league victory over Rīgas Futbola skola. All in all he scored 10 goals in 18 league appearances and was named Young Player of the Year, receiving the Ilmārs Liepiņš prize at the end of the season. Olimps/RFS finished fifth in the league table, which is, to date, the best result in the club's history.

=== Skonto Riga ===
In January 2010 Karašausks went on trial with Skonto Riga and became one of five Olimps/RFS players to be signed by the club and the newly appointed manager Aleksandrs Starkovs. He managed to score 7 goals in his first 4 appearances and was named the league's best player in April. All in all Karašausks scored 8 goals in 12 league matches, helping Skonto become the Latvian Higher League champions for the first time since 2004. In July, he went on trial with the Ukrainian Premier League club Dnipro Dnipropetrovsk and joined the club on loan until the end of the year in August 2010. In January 2011 Karašausks returned to Skonto, having appeared in 9 matches of the Dnipro reserve team and scored 2 goals. The 2011 season saw Karašausks score 2 goals in 15 league matches. Due to injuries and conflicting with the club's board, Karašausks did not appear in a single match of the 2012 Latvian Higher League until August, when he was given out on loan to FB Gulbene. During the loan spell Karašausks participated in 15 matches and scored 1 goal.

In January 2013 he returned to Skonto and after the managerial change regained a place in the starting eleven under Tamaz Pertia. Karašausks scored 16 goals in 24 matches, becoming the top scorer of the league and helping Skonto finish the season as the runners-up. On 18 July 2013 he scored his first goal in the UEFA Europa League, helping Skonto beat the Czech club Slovan Liberec 2–1 at home. At the end of the season Karašausks was included in the sportacentrs.com and Sporta Avīze teams of the tournament. In January 2014 he was invited to join the Russian Premier League club CSKA Moscow on trial, but, eventually, did not stay with the club. In February, he was loaned to another Russian Premier League club Rubin Kazan until the end of the season. In June 2014, after his loan spell ended, Karašausks became a free agent. He rejoined Skonto for the 2015 season, scoring in the club's Europa league game versus St Patrick's Athletic F.C. In the first part of 2016 he had a short loan spell at Piast Gliwice in Poland. In August 2016 Karašausks signed a contract with Swiss Challenge League club FC Wil.

=== Riga FC and Pafos FC ===
Karašausks signed with FK RFS for the 2019 season. But already before the end of 2018, Cypriot club Pafos FC – which is the partner club of Riga FC – offered to buy the players contract for about $100,000. Then on 29 January, before he got his debut for RFS, the Cypriot club announced, that they had signed the player. A week and a half later, the two clubs decided, that Karašausks was going to spend 2019 at Riga FC on loan.

== International career ==
Karašausks was a member of Latvia U-17, Latvia U-19 and Latvia U-21 football teams. He was firstly called up to the senior side for a friendly match against Ghana on 5 June 2010, making his debut then, coming on as a substitution in the 59th minute and replacing Artjoms Rudņevs. He became Latvia's first player, born after regaining independence in 1990, to play for the national team. Karašausks returned to the national team on 7 September 2013, when he was called up for the FIFA World Cup 2014 qualifying match against Greece to fill in for the suspended Artjoms Rudņevs and Valērijs Šabala. On 19 November 2013 Karašauks, alongside five other players, was banned from the Latvia U-21 team due to disciplinary infringement after the victory over Liechtenstein on 15 November 2013.

== Personal life ==
Karašausks' father Jurijs Karašausks is a former footballer, who played 6 international matches for Latvia from 1995 to 1998. According to skontofc.com, Karašausks' hobby is playing tennis.

== Career statistics ==
Scores and results list Latvia's goal tally first.

No.	Date	Venue	Opponent	Score	Result	Competition
1.	13 October 2018	Daugava Stadium, Riga, Latvia	Kazakhstan	1–1	1–1	2018–19 UEFA Nations League D

== Honours ==
Skonto Riga

- Latvian Higher League champion
  - 2010
- Baltic League winner
  - 2011
- Latvian Cup winner
  - 2012

Individual

- Best youth player of Latvian Higher League
  - 2009
- Latvian Higher League top scorer (16 goals)
  - 2013
