= FK Jelgava =

Latvian football club

- Full name: Futbola klubs Jelgava (Football club Jelgava)
- Founded: 2004
- Dissolved: 2021
- Ground: Zemgale Olympic Center
- Capacity: 1,560
- Chairman: Māris Peilāns
- Manager: Dāvis Caune
- Website: www.fkjelgava.lv
Home colours	Away colours

FK Jelgava is a Latvian football club that is based in Jelgava. The club plays its home-matches at the Zemgales Olimpiskais Sporta Centrs stadium with capacity of 1,560 people. In 2021, the club dissolved its professional team, which was absorbed by its phoenix club FS Jelgava.

== Early years ==
Until 2004 two Jelgava football clubs FK Viola and RAF Jelgava played in 1. līga. In 2004, it was made decision to merge both clubs into one forming FK Jelgava. FK Jelgava has played since their foundation in 2004 in the 1. līga, but in 2009 after winning the Latvian First League the team had the chance to play their first games in the Virslīga.

On 19 May 2010 FK Jelgava won the Latvian Cup final in Skonto Stadium, beating FK Jūrmala-VV 6:5 in a penalty shoot out after the game had finished 0:0.

On the way to the final, the club beat FK Liepājas Metalurgs in the quarter-finals and Skonto FC in the semi-finals. Victory in the Latvian Cup final allowed FK Jelgava to debut in the UEFA Europa League tournament. In the second qualifying round FK Jelgava played Molde FK from Norway. With a score of 2:2 on aggregate, Molde won on away goals.

In the 2010 season Jelgava was the only Latvian football club which won a game in European football tournaments (2:1 against Molde).

On 2 September 2010 FK Jelgava played a friendly against Premier League club Blackpool. The match marked the opening of the Olympic Sports Center of Zemgale. The President of Latvia Valdis Zatlers and the British Ambassador in Latvia attended the game.

Due to financial problems, the club lost its professional license in February 2021 and was deprived of the opportunity to play in the top competition, reverting to the status of a youth academy. Its professional team was succeeded by the related FS Jelgava.

== Honours ==
=== Latvia ===
- Latvian Higher League
  - Runners-up (1): 2016
- Latvian Cup
  - Winners (4): 2009–10, 2013–14, 2014–15, 2015–16

== League and Cup history ==
Season	Division (Name)	Pos./Teams	Pl.	W	D	L	GS	GA	P	Latvian Football Cup
2004	2nd (1.līga)	11/(14)	26	7	5	14	43	69	26	1/16 finals
2005	2nd (1.līga)	11/(14)	26	8	2	16	43	59	26	1/8 finals
2006	2nd (1.līga)	9/(16)	26	12	6	12	53	49	42	1/8 finals
2007	2nd (1.līga)	5/(16)	30	16	6	8	70	43	54	2nd Round
2008	2nd (1.līga)	4/(15)	28	19	3	6	63	41	60	1/8 finals
2009	2nd (1.līga)	1/(14)	26	19	5	2	57	20	62	Not Held
2010	1st (Virsliga)	6/(10)	27	6	7	14	36	45	25	Winner
2011	1st (Virsliga)	6/(9)	32	13	4	15	47	54	43	1/4 finals
2012	1st (Virsliga)	7/(10)	36	7	10	19	32	56	31	1/2 finals
2013	1st (Virsliga)	8/(10)	27	5	8	14	26	46	23	1/8 finals
2014	1st (Virsliga)	3/(10)	36	20	10	6	57	27	70	Winner
2015	1st (Virsliga)	4/(8)	24	11	8	5	26	18	41	Winner
2016	1st (Virsliga)	2/(8)	28	16	3	9	37	24	51	Winner
2017	1st (Virsliga)	6/(8)	24	8	5	11	22	30	29	1/4 finals
2018	1st (Virsliga)	6/(8)	28	6	3	19	19	48	21	1/8 finals
2019	1st (Virsliga)	7/(9)	32	9	11	12	34	37	38	Runners-up

== European record ==
Season	Competition	Round	Team	Home	Away	Aggregate
2010–11	UEFA Europa League	2Q	(Norway) Molde FK	2–1	0–1	2–2(a)
2014–15	UEFA Europa League	1Q	(Norway) Rosenborg	0–2	0–4	0–6
2015–16	UEFA Europa League	1Q	(Bulgaria) Litex Lovech	1–1	2–2	3–3 (a)
2015–16	UEFA Europa League	2Q	(North Macedonia) Rabotnički	1–0	0–2	1–2
2016–17	UEFA Europa League	1Q	(Iceland) Breiðablik	2–2	3–2	5–4
2016–17	UEFA Europa League	2Q	(Slovakia) Slovan Bratislava	3–0	0–0	3–0
2016–17	UEFA Europa League	3Q	(Israel) Beitar Jerusalem	1–1	0–3	1–4
2017–18	UEFA Europa League	1Q	(Hungary) Ferencváros	0–1	0–2	0–3

== Players and staff ==
=== Out on loan ===
Note: Flags indicate national team as defined under FIFA eligibility rules; some limited exceptions apply. Players may hold more than one non-FIFA nationality.

No.	Pos.	Nation	Player

=== Staff ===
Name, surname	Position
(Latvia) Māris Peilāns	Chairman
(Latvia) Jānis Vuguls	Director
(Latvia) Dāvis Caune	Manager
(Latvia) Sergejs Diguļovs	Goalkeeper Coach
(Latvia) Oļegs Samoiļenko	Doctor
(Latvia) Jurijs Ksenzovs	Physio
(Latvia) Mārtiņš Krūmiņš	Technical Director
(Latvia) Daniels Ivanovs	Administrator

=== Managers ===
- (Latvia) Dainis Kazakevičs (2004 – 2012)
- (Latvia) Jānis Dreimanis (2013)
- (Latvia) Sergejs Golubevs (interim) (2013)
- (Latvia) Sergejs Golubevs (2013)
- (Latvia) Vladimirs Beškarevs (2014)
- (Latvia) Dāvis Caune (interim) (June 2014)
- (Latvia) Vitālijs Astafjevs (June 2014 – May 2016)
- (Latvia) Dāvis Caune (interim) (May 2016 - June 2016)
- (Lithuania) Saulius Širmelis (June 2016 – December 2016)
- (Moldova) Alexandru Curteian (December 2016 – August 2017)
- (Latvia) Dāvis Caune (interim) (August 2017)
- (Russia) Ravil Sabitov (August 2017 - May 2018)
- (Latvia) Marians Pahars (June 2018 - June 2019)
- (Belarus) Oleg Kubarev (June 2019 - August 2020)
- (Latvia) Dāvis Caune (interim) (August 2020 -)

=== Player of the season (since 2013) ===
Season	Name
2013	(Latvia) Vadims Žuļevs
2014	(Latvia) Kaspars Ikstens
2015	(Latvia) Mārcis Ošs
2016	(Latvia) Gļebs Kļuškins
