= List of Latvian football transfers winter 2016–17 =

This is a list of Latvian football transfers in the 2016–17 winter transfer window by club. Only transfers of the Virslīga are included.

All transfers mentioned are shown in the references at the bottom of the page. If you wish to insert a transfer that isn't mentioned there, please add a reference.

== Latvian Higher League ==
=== Spartaks ===
In: Note: Flags indicate national team as defined under FIFA eligibility rules; some limited exceptions apply. Players may hold more than one non-FIFA nationality.

| No. | Pos. | Nation | Player |
|---|---|---|---|
| — | GK | LVA | Jevgēņijs Ņerugals (from BFC Daugavpils) |
| — | GK | RUS | Alexey Kozlov (from (Russia) Spartak-2 Moscow) |
| — | GK | KAZ | Abylaykhan Duysen (on loan from (Kazakhstan) FC Astana) |
| — | DF | LVA | Pāvels Mihadjuks (from Liepāja, previously on loan) |
| — | DF | LVA | Ņikita Bērenfelds (on loan from Liepāja) |
| — | DF | LVA | Klāvs Bāliņš (from Riga FC) |
| — | DF | CRO | Luka Šimunović (from (Croatia) NK Rudeš) |
| — | MF | LVA | Edgars Vardanjans (from METTA/LU) |
| — | MF | UKR | Artem Habelok (from (Ukraine) Shakhtar Donetsk U-21) |
| — | MF | LVA | Ralfs Džeriņš (from Liepāja) |
| — | FW | UKR | Rostyslav Rusyn (from (Ukraine) Shakhtar Donetsk U-21) |

Out: Note: Flags indicate national team as defined under FIFA eligibility rules; some limited exceptions apply. Players may hold more than one non-FIFA nationality.

| No. | Pos. | Nation | Player |
|---|---|---|---|
| 2 | DF | MDA | Constantin Bogdan (to (Moldova) Milsami Orhei) |
| 5 | DF | LVA | Aleksandrs Gubins (to AFA Olaine) |
| 7 | MF | LVA | Daniils Ulimbaševs (to RFS) |
| 9 | MF | FIN | Moshtagh Yaghoubi (to (Finland) HJK Helsinki) |
| 10 | FW | CIV | Ridwaru Adeyemo (to (Italy) ASD Troina) |
| 14 | DF | BLR | Mikalay Kashewski (retired) |
| 17 | MF | LVA | Andrejs Kiriļins (to Jelgava) |
| 19 | FW | LVA | Artis Jaudzems (to Jelgava) |
| 35 | GK | LVA | Vladislavs Kurakins (to Riga FC) |
| 77 | GK | LTU | Marius Rapalis (retired) |

=== Jelgava ===
In: Note: Flags indicate national team as defined under FIFA eligibility rules; some limited exceptions apply. Players may hold more than one non-FIFA nationality.

| No. | Pos. | Nation | Player |
|---|---|---|---|
| — | GK | LVA | Jānis Krūmiņš (from (Cyprus) Pafos FC) |
| — | DF | CRO | Ante Bakmaz (on loan from (Malta) St. Andrews F.C.) |
| — | DF | LVA | Reinis Flaksis (from RFS) |
| — | DF | LVA | Dmitrijs Klimašēvičs (on loan from BFC Daugavpils) |
| — | MF | LVA | Alans Siņeļņikovs (from Ventspils) |
| — | MF | LTU | Rytis Leliūga (from (Norway) HamKam) |
| — | MF | LVA | Andrejs Kiriļins (from Spartaks) |
| — | MF | LVA | Maksims Rafaļskis (from (Germany) Askania Bernburg) |
| — | MF | LVA | Edgars Jermolajevs (from Skonto FC) |
| — | MF | BRA | Rafael Ledesma (from (Malta) Gzira United) |
| — | MF | MDA | Alexandru Curteian (from (Russia) Kuban-2 Krasnodar) |
| — | FW | EST | Kevin Kauber (loan return from (Estonia) Levadia Tallinn) |
| — | FW | LTU | Evaldas Razulis (from (Lithuania) FK Atlantas) |
| — | FW | LVA | Artis Jaudzems (from Spartaks) |

Out: Note: Flags indicate national team as defined under FIFA eligibility rules; some limited exceptions apply. Players may hold more than one non-FIFA nationality.

| No. | Pos. | Nation | Player |
|---|---|---|---|
| 3 | DF | LVA | Igors Savčenkovs (to Ventspils) |
| 4 | DF | LVA | Vitālijs Smirnovs (to Riga FC) |
| 6 | MF | JPN | Ryotaro Nakano (to (Thailand) Chonburi FC) |
| 8 | MF | LVA | Andrejs Kovaļovs (to Riga FC) |
| 9 | MF | UKR | Kyrylo Silich (to (Lithuania) Dainava Alytus) |
| 10 | MF | LVA | Boriss Bogdaškins (to Riga FC) |
| 11 | FW | LVA | Daniils Turkovs (to Riga FC) |
| 15 | DF | SEN | Abdoulaye Diallo (released) |
| 17 | DF | RUS | Artjoms Osipovs (to Liepāja) |
| 19 | FW | LTU | Karolis Laukžemis (loan return to (Lithuania) Sūduva Marijampolė) |
| 24 | GK | LVA | Mārcis Melecis (on loan to (Lithuania) Dainava Alytus) |
| 27 | FW | LVA | Verners Zalaks (released) |
| 30 | FW | LVA | Mareks Labanovskis (to FK Auda) |
| 46 | FW | LVA | Antons Dresmanis (to SK Babīte) |
| - | MF | NGA | Kennedy Eriba (released, previously on loan at (Lithuania) FC Stumbras) |
| - | FW | NGA | Ismail Musa (released, previously on loan at FK Auda) |

=== Ventspils ===
In: Note: Flags indicate national team as defined under FIFA eligibility rules; some limited exceptions apply. Players may hold more than one non-FIFA nationality.

| No. | Pos. | Nation | Player |
|---|---|---|---|
| — | DF | LVA | Igors Savčenkovs (from Jelgava) |
| — | MF | BLR | Artsyom Vaskow (from (Belarus) Neman Grodno) |
| — | MF | NGA | Tosin Aiyegun (from (Nigeria) Real Sapphire FC) |
| — | FW | NGA | Akinyemi Adeleke Akinola (from (Nigeria) Real Sapphire FC) |

Out: Note: Flags indicate national team as defined under FIFA eligibility rules; some limited exceptions apply. Players may hold more than one non-FIFA nationality.

| No. | Pos. | Nation | Player |
|---|---|---|---|
| 5 | DF | NGA | Adebayo Adigun (released) |
| 8 | MF | LVA | Alans Siņeļņikovs (to Jelgava) |
| 13 | GK | LVA | Valentīns Raļkevičs (to Liepāja) |
| 17 | FW | KOR | Hyeok Jun Lee (released) |
| 18 | MF | LVA | Vladimirs Mukins (to SK Babīte) |
| 44 | DF | RUS | Yevgeny Postnikov (loan return to (Kazakhstan) FC Astana) |
| - | DF | LVA | Deniss Bezuščonoks (released, previously on loan at BFC Daugavpils) |
| - | FW | LVA | Anastasijs Mordatenko (released, previously on loan at (Serbia) Radnički Niš) |

=== Liepāja ===
In: Note: Flags indicate national team as defined under FIFA eligibility rules; some limited exceptions apply. Players may hold more than one non-FIFA nationality.

| No. | Pos. | Nation | Player |
|---|---|---|---|
| — | GK | LVA | Valentīns Raļkevičs (from Ventspils) |
| — | DF | SEN | Sady Gueye (from (Senegal) Diambars FC) |
| — | DF | SEN | Seydina Keita (from (Senegal) Diambars FC) |
| — | DF | RUS | Artjoms Osipovs (from Jelgava) |
| — | DF | GEO | Vasiko Bachiashvili (from (Georgia (country)) FC Tskhinvali) |
| — | MF | LVA | Raivis Jurkovskis (loan return from RFS) |
| — | MF | LVA | Andris Krušatins (loan return from RFS) |
| — | MF | GEO | Giorgi Eristavi (from (Georgia (country)) Dila Gori) |
| — | MF | MTN | Abdoulaye Sileye Gaye (from (Mauritania) FC Nouadhibou) |
| — | MF | MTN | Mohamed Yaly Dellahi (from (Mauritania) FC Nouadhibou) |
| — | MF | MTN | Alassane Diop (from (Mauritania) FC Nouadhibou) |
| — | FW | LVA | Artūrs Karašausks (from (Switzerland) FC Wil) |

Out: Note: Flags indicate national team as defined under FIFA eligibility rules; some limited exceptions apply. Players may hold more than one non-FIFA nationality.

| No. | Pos. | Nation | Player |
|---|---|---|---|
| 4 | DF | LVA | Krists Gulbis (on loan to Grobiņas SC) |
| 8 | DF | LVA | Ņikita Bērenfelds (on loan to Spartaks) |
| 13 | DF | LVA | Kaspars Gorkšs (to Riga FC) |
| 17 | FW | LVA | Toms Gucs (on loan to Grobiņas SC) |
| 18 | MF | LVA | Ralfs Džeriņš (to Spartaks) |
| 24 | MF | CRO | Marko Brtan (to (Croatia) NK Lučko) |
| 32 | GK | LVA | Gļebs Sopots (on loan to Grobiņas SC) |
| 40 | DF | CRO | Dino Kluk (to (Croatia) Lokomotiva Zagreb) |
| 91 | FW | LVA | Dēvids Dobrecovs (on loan to Grobiņas SC) |
| - | DF | LVA | Endijs Šlampe (to RFS, previously on loan) |
| - | DF | LVA | Pāvels Mihadjuks (to Spartaks, previously on loan) |
| - | MF | LVA | Roberts Savaļnieks (to RFS, previously on loan at Riga FC) |
| - | FW | LVA | Dāvis Ikaunieks (to (Czech Republic) Vysočina Jihlava, previously on loan) |

=== Riga FC ===
In: Note: Flags indicate national team as defined under FIFA eligibility rules; some limited exceptions apply. Players may hold more than one non-FIFA nationality.

| No. | Pos. | Nation | Player |
|---|---|---|---|
| — | GK | LVA | Vladislavs Kurakins (from Spartaks) |
| — | GK | LVA | Deniss Romanovs (from RFS) |
| — | DF | LVA | Kaspars Gorkšs (from Liepāja) |
| — | DF | LVA | Antons Kurakins (from (Scotland) Hamilton Academical) |
| — | DF | LVA | Viktors Litvinskis (from RFS) |
| — | DF | LVA | Vitālijs Smirnovs (from Jelgava) |
| — | DF | MKD | Egzon Belica (from (Finland) Inter Turku) |
| — | DF | CIV | Cédric Gogoua (from (Serbia) FK Partizan) |
| — | MF | RUS | Ivan Yenin (from (Russia) Vityaz Podolsk, previously on loan) |
| — | MF | LVA | Artūrs Zjuzins (from (Russia) FC Tambov) |
| — | MF | LVA | Andrejs Kovaļovs (from Jelgava) |
| — | MF | LVA | Boriss Bogdaškins (from Jelgava) |
| — | MF | NGA | Chinonso Okonkwo (from (Nigeria) Rivers United) |
| — | MF | SVN | Rene Mihelič (from (Israel) Hapoel Ra'anana) |
| — | MF | UKR | Vitaliy Fedotov (from (Russia) Arsenal Tula) |
| — | FW | LVA | Daniils Turkovs (from Jelgava) |
| — | FW | LVA | Valērijs Šabala (on loan from (Belgium) Club Brugge) |
| — | FW | RUS | Khyzyr Appayev (from (Russia) Arsenal Tula) |

Out: Note: Flags indicate national team as defined under FIFA eligibility rules; some limited exceptions apply. Players may hold more than one non-FIFA nationality.

| No. | Pos. | Nation | Player |
|---|---|---|---|
| 1 | GK | RUS | Denis Kniga (loan return to (Russia) FC Tosno) |
| 5 | DF | RUS | Sergei Shumeyko (to (Russia) Avangard Kursk) |
| 7 | MF | RUS | Yevgeni Sherenkov (released) |
| 9 | FW | BFA | Aristide Bancé (to (Ivory Coast) ASEC Mimosas) |
| 10 | MF | LVA | Roberts Savaļnieks (loan return to Liepāja) |
| 11 | FW | LVA | Verners Apiņš (to SK Babīte) |
| 23 | DF | LVA | Vitālijs Barinovs (to (Lithuania) FK Jonava) |
| 30 | DF | LVA | Klāvs Bāliņš (to Spartaks) |
| 33 | MF | SLE | John Kamara (to (Kazakhstan) FC Kaisar) |
| 70 | FW | LVA | Sergejs Vorobjovs (to RFS) |
| 72 | GK | UKR | Ihor Lytovka (released) |
| 99 | FW | JPN | Yōsuke Saitō (to (Australia) Essendon Royals) |
| - | FW | UKR | Pavlo Fedosov (on loan to (Ukraine) Arsenal Kyiv, previously on loan at (Ukraine) PFC Sumy) |

=== RFS ===
In: Note: Flags indicate national team as defined under FIFA eligibility rules; some limited exceptions apply. Players may hold more than one non-FIFA nationality.

| No. | Pos. | Nation | Player |
|---|---|---|---|
| — | GK | RUS | Daniil Sizko (from (Russia) Shinnik Yaroslavl) |
| — | GK | LVA | Daniils Isačenko (from RTU FC) |
| — | DF | LVA | Endijs Šlampe (from Liepāja, previously on loan) |
| — | DF | LVA | Renārs Rode (from (South Africa) Cape Town City) |
| — | DF | GEO | Lasha Shergelashvili (from (Georgia (country)) FC Samtredia) |
| — | DF | CRO | Luka Perić (from (Croatia) HNK Gorica) |
| — | DF | LVA | Aleksandrs Solovjovs (from (Estonia) Sillamäe Kalev) |
| — | MF | LVA | Igors Kozlovs (from Skonto FC, previously on loan) |
| — | MF | LVA | Roberts Savaļnieks (from Liepāja) |
| — | MF | LVA | Aleksandrs Fertovs (from (Poland) Korona Kielce) |
| — | MF | LVA | Daniils Ulimbaševs (from Spartaks) |
| — | MF | LVA | Jānis Grīnbergs (from Skonto FC) |
| — | MF | LVA | Aleksandrs Cauņa (from (Russia) CSKA Moscow) |
| — | FW | LVA | Sergejs Vorobjovs (from Riga FC) |
| — | FW | LVA | Roberts Uldriķis (from METTA/LU) |
| — | FW | BLR | Leonid Kovel (from (Belarus) FC Minsk) |

Out: Note: Flags indicate national team as defined under FIFA eligibility rules; some limited exceptions apply. Players may hold more than one non-FIFA nationality.

| No. | Pos. | Nation | Player |
|---|---|---|---|
| 3 | DF | LVA | Viktors Litvinskis (to Riga FC) |
| 4 | DF | LVA | Ritus Krjauklis (to (Malaysia) PKNP FC) |
| 6 | MF | LVA | Aleksejs Grjaznovs (on loan to SK Babīte) |
| 8 | DF | LVA | Ņikita Kaļiņins (released) |
| 9 | MF | LVA | Edgars Jermolajevs (loan return to Skonto FC) |
| 11 | FW | LVA | Ņikita Kovaļonoks (released) |
| 13 | MF | LVA | Raivis Jurkovskis (loan return to Liepāja) |
| 15 | MF | RUS | Nika Piliyev (to (Russia) Domodedovo Moscow) |
| 16 | GK | LVA | Deniss Romanovs (to Riga FC) |
| 19 | DF | LVA | Reinis Flaksis (to Jelgava) |
| 21 | FW | LTU | Darius Kazubovičius (loan return to (Lithuania) Žalgiris Vilnius) |
| 22 | FW | LVA | Aleksejs Davidenkovs (to SK Babīte) |
| 24 | GK | LVA | Kristaps Dzelme (to RTU FC) |
| 31 | MF | LVA | Vladas Rimkus (to SK Babīte) |
| 32 | DF | LVA | Viktors Jurkovs (to RTU FC) |
| 39 | FW | LVA | Oskars Rubenis (to (Russia) CSKA Moscow) |
| 44 | MF | LVA | Andris Krušatins (loan return to Liepāja) |
| - | GK | LVA | Hugo Puriņš (to FK Auda, previously on loan) |

=== METTA/LU ===
In: Note: Flags indicate national team as defined under FIFA eligibility rules; some limited exceptions apply. Players may hold more than one non-FIFA nationality.

| No. | Pos. | Nation | Player |
|---|---|---|---|
| — | DF | RSA | Kabelo Seriba (from (South Africa) SuperSport United) |
| — | MF | LVA | Aivars Emsis (from JDFS Alberts) |
| — | FW | LVA | Ņikita Ivanovs (from Skonto FC) |
| — | FW | LVA | Vladislavs Fjodorovs (from BFC Daugavpils) |

Out: Note: Flags indicate national team as defined under FIFA eligibility rules; some limited exceptions apply. Players may hold more than one non-FIFA nationality.

| No. | Pos. | Nation | Player |
|---|---|---|---|
| 3 | DF | LVA | Davids Bagdasarjans (to RTU FC) |
| 7 | MF | LVA | Edgars Vardanjans (to Spartaks) |
| 8 | MF | JPN | Takato Yamazaki (released) |
| 10 | FW | LVA | Roberts Uldriķis (to RFS) |

=== SK Babīte ===
In: Note: Flags indicate national team as defined under FIFA eligibility rules; some limited exceptions apply. Players may hold more than one non-FIFA nationality.

| No. | Pos. | Nation | Player |
|---|---|---|---|
| — | DF | GHA | Richmond Nketiah (loan return from (Russia) Arsenal Tula) |
| — | DF | RUS | Pavel Mochalin (from (Russia) SKA-Khabarovsk) |
| — | DF | BLR | Alyaksandr Danilaw (from (Belarus) FC Gomel) |
| — | DF | UKR | Andriy Khomyn (from (Ukraine) Hoverla Uzhhorod) |
| — | DF | GHA | Jeremiah Arkorful (from (Ghana) Tema Youth) |
| — | DF | LVA | Edgars Fjodorovs (from FK Auda) |
| — | DF | LVA | Madars Liepiņlauskis (from AFA Olaine) |
| — | MF | LVA | Vladimirs Mukins (from Ventspils) |
| — | MF | LVA | Vladas Rimkus (from RFS) |
| — | MF | LVA | Aleksejs Grjaznovs (on loan from RFS) |
| — | MF | RUS | Kirill Morozov (from (Russia) FC Rodina) |
| — | MF | RUS | Evgenii Evgenev (from (Russia) FC Rodina) |
| — | MF | UKR | Ilya Mykhailovsky (from (Ukraine) Zorya Luhansk) |
| — | FW | LVA | Verners Apiņš (from Riga FC) |
| — | FW | LVA | Aleksejs Davidenkovs (from RFS) |
| — | FW | LVA | Antons Dresmanis (from Jelgava) |
| — | FW | RUS | Vyacheslav Sushkin (from (Georgia (country)) Sioni Bolnisi) |
| — | FW | CIV | Mohamed Konaté (from (Russia) Ural Yekaterinburg) |

Out: Note: Flags indicate national team as defined under FIFA eligibility rules; some limited exceptions apply. Players may hold more than one non-FIFA nationality.

| No. | Pos. | Nation | Player |
|---|---|---|---|
| 1 | GK | LVA | Igors Labuts (to (Republic of Ireland) Athlone Town) |
| 8 | FW | SRB | Miodrag Todorović (released) |
| 12 | GK | LVA | Antons Remezs (released) |
| 88 | DF | SRB | Nenad Vasić (released) |
