= List of Latvian football transfers summer 2017 =

This is a list of Latvian football transfers in the 2017 summer transfer window by club. Only transfers of the Virslīga are included.

All transfers mentioned are shown in the references at the bottom of the page. If you wish to insert a transfer that isn't mentioned there, please add a reference.

== Latvian Higher League ==
=== Spartaks ===
In: Note: Flags indicate national team as defined under FIFA eligibility rules; some limited exceptions apply. Players may hold more than one non-FIFA nationality.

No.	Pos.	Nation	Player
—	GK	LVA	Vitālijs Meļņičenko (from (Russia) Fakel Voronezh)
—	DF	BIH	Aleksandar Kosorić (from (Bosnia and Herzegovina) Radnik Bijeljina)
—	MF	UZB	Aziz Ibragimov (from (Iran) Machine Sazi)
—	MF	LVA	Ingars Sarmis Stuglis (from METTA/LU)
—	FW	CRO	Kruno Ivančić (from (Croatia) NK Sesvete)

Out: Note: Flags indicate national team as defined under FIFA eligibility rules; some limited exceptions apply. Players may hold more than one non-FIFA nationality.

No.	Pos.	Nation	Player
19	FW	UKR	Rostyslav Rusyn (released)
32	DF	LVA	Ralfs Džeriņš (to Grobiņas SC)
47	GK	KAZ	Abylaikhan Duisen (loan return to (Kazakhstan) FC Astana)
99	GK	LVA	Vladislavs Lazarevs (to (Italy) Mantova 1911)

=== Jelgava ===
In: Note: Flags indicate national team as defined under FIFA eligibility rules; some limited exceptions apply. Players may hold more than one non-FIFA nationality.

No.	Pos.	Nation	Player
—	DF	LVA	Endijs Šlampe (from RFS)
—	DF	LVA	Antons Dresmanis (from Babīte/Dinamo)
—	MF	ANG	Valdo Alhinho (from (Malta) Valletta F.C.)
—	MF	LVA	Vadims Avdejevs (from Babīte/Dinamo)
—	FW	ENG	Kler Heh (from (Lithuania) Dainava Alytus)
—	FW	LVA	Verners Apiņš (from Babīte/Dinamo)

Out: Note: Flags indicate national team as defined under FIFA eligibility rules; some limited exceptions apply. Players may hold more than one non-FIFA nationality.

No.	Pos.	Nation	Player
6	MF	ANG	Valdo Alhinho (to (Saudi Arabia) Al-Batin F.C.)
9	MF	LTU	Mindaugas Grigaravičius (on loan to (Lithuania) FK Jonava)
12	FW	LVA	Oļegs Malašenoks (to AFA Olaine)
30	MF	BRA	Rafael Ledesma (to (Belarus) FC Vitebsk)

=== Ventspils ===
In: Note: Flags indicate national team as defined under FIFA eligibility rules; some limited exceptions apply. Players may hold more than one non-FIFA nationality.

No.	Pos.	Nation	Player
—	DF	LVA	Nauris Bulvītis (from (England) Plymouth Argyle)
—	MF	LVA	Vladimirs Mukins (from Babīte/Dinamo)
—	FW	ARM	Viulen Ayvazyan (from (Armenia) FC Shirak)

Out: Note: Flags indicate national team as defined under FIFA eligibility rules; some limited exceptions apply. Players may hold more than one non-FIFA nationality.

No.	Pos.	Nation	Player
20	FW	LVA	Ģirts Karlsons (on loan to Liepāja)
22	DF	SRB	Nikola Boranijašević (to (Serbia) Napredak Kruševac)
23	FW	LVA	Kaspars Svārups (to (Norway) Sortland IL)

=== Liepāja ===
In: Note: Flags indicate national team as defined under FIFA eligibility rules; some limited exceptions apply. Players may hold more than one non-FIFA nationality.

No.	Pos.	Nation	Player
—	GK	LVA	Gļebs Sopots (loan return from Grobiņas SC)
—	DF	MNE	Mihailo Tomković (from (Montenegro) OFK Petrovac)
—	DF	RUS	Stanislav Lebamba (from (Russia) KAMAZ Naberezhnye Chelny)
—	MF	LVA	Jānis Ikaunieks (on loan from (France) FC Metz)
—	MF	GEO	Luka Zviadadze (from (Russia) FShM Torpedo Moscow)
—	MF	UKR	Serhiy Shevchuk (from (Belarus) FC Vitebsk)
—	FW	LVA	Ģirts Karlsons (on loan from Ventspils)

Out: Note: Flags indicate national team as defined under FIFA eligibility rules; some limited exceptions apply. Players may hold more than one non-FIFA nationality.

No.	Pos.	Nation	Player
6	DF	RUS	Artjoms Osipovs (to (Lithuania) FK Jonava)
15	DF	LVA	Antons Tumanovs (on loan to Grobiņas SC)
21	DF	GEO	Vako Bachiashvili (to (Lithuania) Kauno Žalgiris)
27	MF	LVA	Romāns Mickevičs (on loan to Riga FC)
80	GK	LVA	Pāvels Doroševs (to (Poland) Olimpia Kowary)
-	DF	LVA	Krists Kristers Gulbis (to METTA/LU, previously on loan at Grobiņas SC)

=== Riga FC ===
In: Note: Flags indicate national team as defined under FIFA eligibility rules; some limited exceptions apply. Players may hold more than one non-FIFA nationality.

No.	Pos.	Nation	Player
—	GK	LVA	Vjačeslavs Kudrjavcevs (from Babīte/Dinamo)
—	DF	SRB	Dušan Brković (from (Hungary) Debreceni VSC)
—	DF	GHA	David Addy (from (Finland) RoPS)
—	DF	LVA	Maksims Petuhovs (from RTU FC)
—	MF	JPN	Minori Sato (from (Qatar) Muaither SC)
—	MF	MNE	Milan Vušurović (from (Montenegro) Budućnost Podgorica)
—	MF	LVA	Romāns Mickevičs (on loan from Liepāja)
—	MF	LVA	Marks Udovičenko (from RTU FC)
—	FW	SRB	Darko Lemajić (from (Serbia) FK Inđija)
—	FW	SRB	Đorđe Šušnjar (from (Switzerland) FC Lugano)

Out: Note: Flags indicate national team as defined under FIFA eligibility rules; some limited exceptions apply. Players may hold more than one non-FIFA nationality.

No.	Pos.	Nation	Player
20	FW	LVA	Valērijs Šabala (loan return to (Belgium) Club Brugge)
23	DF	MKD	Egzon Belica (released)
31	DF	CIV	Cédric Gogoua (to (Kazakhstan) FC Kairat)
34	DF	LVA	Antonijs Černomordijs (on loan to (Cyprus) Pafos FC)
35	FW	UKR	Pavlo Fedosov (released)
37	MF	UKR	Vitaliy Fedotov (to (Russia) SKA-Khabarovsk)
82	MF	SVN	Rene Mihelič (to (India) Chennaiyin FC)
88	FW	RUS	Khyzyr Appaev (to (Russia) Avangard Kursk)

=== RFS ===
In: Note: Flags indicate national team as defined under FIFA eligibility rules; some limited exceptions apply. Players may hold more than one non-FIFA nationality.

No.	Pos.	Nation	Player
—	DF	LVA	Kaspars Dubra (from (Belarus) BATE Borisov)
—	DF	SRB	Milan Savić (from (Malta) Balzan F.C.)
—	DF	LVA	Viktors Jurkovs (from RTU FC)
—	DF	LVA	Daniels Balodis (from RTU FC)
—	MF	SRB	Srđan Dimitrov (from (Malta) Birkirkara F.C.)
—	FW	LVA	Eduards Višņakovs (from (Belgium) K.V.C. Westerlo)

Out: Note: Flags indicate national team as defined under FIFA eligibility rules; some limited exceptions apply. Players may hold more than one non-FIFA nationality.

No.	Pos.	Nation	Player
5	DF	LVA	Endijs Šlampe (to Jelgava)
12	MF	GAM	Ensa Njie (to (Spain) Moralo CP)
25	DF	CRO	Luka Perić (to (Lithuania) FK Jonava)
27	MF	LVA	Jānis Grīnbergs (to (Germany) Schalke 04 II)
-	MF	LVA	Aleksejs Grjaznovs (to RTU FC, previously on loan at Babīte/Dinamo)

=== METTA/LU ===
In: Note: Flags indicate national team as defined under FIFA eligibility rules; some limited exceptions apply. Players may hold more than one non-FIFA nationality.

No.	Pos.	Nation	Player
—	DF	LVA	Krists Kristers Gulbis (from Liepāja)

Out: Note: Flags indicate national team as defined under FIFA eligibility rules; some limited exceptions apply. Players may hold more than one non-FIFA nationality.

No.	Pos.	Nation	Player
7	MF	LVA	Ingars Sarmis Stuglis (to Spartaks)
16	FW	LVA	Sergejs Vasiļjevs (to BFC Daugavpils)
17	MF	LVA	Krists Kalniņš (to FK Ogre)

=== Babīte/Dinamo ===
In: Note: Flags indicate national team as defined under FIFA eligibility rules; some limited exceptions apply. Players may hold more than one non-FIFA nationality.

No.	Pos.	Nation	Player
—	GK	LVA	Deniss Pērkons (from RTU FC)

Out: Note: Flags indicate national team as defined under FIFA eligibility rules; some limited exceptions apply. Players may hold more than one non-FIFA nationality.

No.	Pos.	Nation	Player
1	GK	LVA	Vjačeslavs Kudrjavcevs (to Riga FC)
2	DF	LVA	Edgars Fjodorovs (to (Lithuania) Dainava Alytus)
5	DF	BLR	Alyaksandr Danilaw (retired)
6	MF	LVA	Aleksejs Grjaznovs (loan return to RFS)
9	FW	RUS	Vyacheslav Sushkin (to (Greece) Niki Volos)
10	MF	LVA	Viktors Kurma (to AFA Olaine)
11	FW	LVA	Niks Savaļnieks (to Valmieras FK)
14	MF	LVA	Aleksejs Saveļjevs (to (Italy) Hellas Verona U-19)
15	FW	LVA	Verners Apiņš (to Jelgava)
18	MF	LVA	Vlads Rimkus (to AFA Olaine)
22	MF	LVA	Oto Šeļegovičs (to RTU FC)
25	DF	LVA	Antons Dresmanis (to Jelgava)
26	MF	LVA	Vladimirs Mukins (to Ventspils)
29	MF	UKR	Ilya Mykhailovsky (to Tukums 2000)
32	DF	UKR	Andriy Khomin (retired)
33	DF	LVA	Tigrans Bagdasarjans (to RTU FC)
45	FW	CIV	Mohamed Konaté (to (Kazakhstan) FC Kairat)
47	DF	RUS	Pavel Mochalin (released)
76	MF	RUS	Dmitri Khokhlov (released)
77	MF	LVA	Maksims Vasiļjevs (to RTU FC)
91	MF	LVA	Vadims Avdejevs (to Jelgava)
-	GK	LVA	Deniss Pērkons (to (Luxembourg) F91 Dudelange)
