= List of Latvian football transfers winter 2015–16 =

This is a list of Latvian football transfers in the 2015–16 winter transfer window by club. Only transfers of the Virslīga are included.

All transfers mentioned are shown in the references at the bottom of the page. If you wish to insert a transfer that isn't mentioned there, please add a reference.

== Latvian Higher League ==
=== Liepāja ===
In: Note: Flags indicate national team as defined under FIFA eligibility rules; some limited exceptions apply. Players may hold more than one non-FIFA nationality.

| No. | Pos. | Nation | Player |
|---|---|---|---|
| — | DF | (Latvia) LVA | Ņikita Bērenfelds (from Skonto) |
| — | MF | (Latvia) LVA | Romāns Mickēvičs (from Spartaks) |
| — | FW | (Latvia) LVA | Edgars Gauračs (on loan from Spartaks) |

Out: Note: Flags indicate national team as defined under FIFA eligibility rules; some limited exceptions apply. Players may hold more than one non-FIFA nationality.

| No. | Pos. | Nation | Player |
|---|---|---|---|
| 1 | GK | (Latvia) LVA | Raivo Varažinskis (to (Norway) Valdres FK) |
| 6 | DF | (Latvia) LVA | Reinis Flaksis (on loan to Riga FC) |
| 8 | MF | (Latvia) LVA | Iļja Šadčins (to Riga FC) |
| 11 | MF | (Latvia) LVA | Roberts Savaļnieks (on loan to Riga FC) |
| 13 | MF | (Latvia) LVA | Raivis Andris Jurkovskis (on loan to Rīgas Futbola skola) |
| 22 | MF | (Latvia) LVA | Andris Krušatins (on loan to Rīgas Futbola skola) |
| 30 | MF | (Argentina) ARG | Martin Emiliano Mercau (to (Argentina) Club Lautaro Roncedo) |
| 99 | FW | (Latvia) LVA | Māris Verpakovskis (retired) |

=== Skonto* ===
In: Note: Flags indicate national team as defined under FIFA eligibility rules; some limited exceptions apply. Players may hold more than one non-FIFA nationality.

| No. | Pos. | Nation | Player |
|---|---|---|---|
| — | GK | (Latvia) LVA | Edgars Vaņins (from FK Auda) |
| — | GK | (Latvia) LVA | Deniss Pērkons (from Salaspils FC) |
| — | DF | (Latvia) LVA | Staņislavs Pihockis (from (Norway) Hammerfest FK) |
| — | DF | (Latvia) LVA | Viktors Golovizins (from Riga FC) |
| — | FW | (Latvia) LVA | Aleksejs Bespalovs (from Riga FC) |
| — | FW | (Latvia) LVA | Andrejs Perepļotkins (from Riga FC) |
| — | MF | (Latvia) LVA | Aleksandrs Zeņkovs (from Riga FC) |
| — | MF | (Latvia) LVA | Raitis Dzelzskalējs (from Riga FC) |
| — | FW | (Latvia) LVA | Vīts Rimkus (free agent) |

Out: Note: Flags indicate national team as defined under FIFA eligibility rules; some limited exceptions apply. Players may hold more than one non-FIFA nationality.

| No. | Pos. | Nation | Player |
|---|---|---|---|
| 1 | GK | (Latvia) LVA | Germans Māliņš (to Rīgas Futbola skola) |
| 2 | DF | (Latvia) LVA | Oļegs Timofejevs (to Riga FC) |
| 3 | DF | (Latvia) LVA | Renārs Rode (to (Czech Republic) Sigma Olomouc) |
| 4 | DF | (Latvia) LVA | Vitālijs Smirnovs (to Jelgava) |
| 5 | DF | (Latvia) LVA | Ņikita Bērenfelds (to Liepāja) |
| 7 | DF | (Russia) RUS | Artjoms Osipovs (to METTA/LU) |
| 8 | MF | (Colombia) COL | Iván Mena (released) |
| 9 | MF | (Latvia) LVA | Aleksejs Višņakovs (to Rīgas Futbola skola) |
| 10 | MF | (Latvia) LVA | Igors Kozlovs (on loan to Rīgas Futbola skola) |
| 11 | MF | (Latvia) LVA | Edgars Jermolajevs (on loan to Rīgas Futbola skola) |
| 12 | FW | (Latvia) LVA | Vladislavs Gutkovskis (to (Poland) Termalica Bruk-Bet Nieciecza) |
| 15 | DF | (Latvia) LVA | Dāvis Sandis Strods (to METTA/LU) |
| 17 | MF | (Latvia) LVA | Andrejs Kovaļovs (loan return to (Moldova) Dacia Chișinău) |
| 18 | DF | (Ghana) GHA | Ofosu Appiah (to (Estonia) Infonet Tallinn) |
| 19 | MF | (Latvia) LVA | Vjačeslavs Isajevs (to Rīgas Futbola skola) |
| 22 | FW | (Latvia) LVA | Ņikita Ivanovs (on loan to Rīgas Futbola skola) |
| 23 | FW | (Ukraine) UKR | Ivan Lukanyuk (to (Ukraine) Veres Rivne) |
| 25 | FW | (Latvia) LVA | Artūrs Karašausks (on loan to (Poland) Piast Gliwice) |
| 26 | FW | (Latvia) LVA | Ēriks Šilings (to Jelgava) |
| 27 | MF | (Latvia) LVA | Mārtiņš Milašēvičs (to METTA/LU) |
| 28 | DF | (Scotland) SCO | Garry Kenneth (to (Scotland) Forfar Albion) |
| 30 | FW | (Latvia) LVA | Dāvis Indrāns (to METTA/LU) |
| 32 | GK | (Latvia) LVA | Andrejs Pavlovs (to Ventspils) |
| 35 | DF | (Latvia) LVA | Vladislavs Sorokins (to Jelgava) |
| 45 | FW | (Latvia) LVA | Aleksejs Davidenkovs (to Jelgava) |
| 80 | GK | (Latvia) LVA | Nils Toms Puriņš (to Jelgava) |

=== Ventspils ===
In: Note: Flags indicate national team as defined under FIFA eligibility rules; some limited exceptions apply. Players may hold more than one non-FIFA nationality.

| No. | Pos. | Nation | Player |
|---|---|---|---|
| — | GK | (Latvia) LVA | Maksims Uvarenko (from (Slovakia) ViOn Zlaté Moravce) |
| — | GK | (Latvia) LVA | Andrejs Pavlovs (from Skonto) |
| — | DF | (Serbia) SRB | Nenad Vasić (on loan from SK Babīte) |
| — | DF | (Latvia) LVA | Raivis Hščanovičs (free agent) |
| — | MF | (Nigeria) NGA | Adebayo Adigun (from (Nigeria) Sunshine Stars) |
| — | MF | (Nigeria) NGA | Abdullahi Alfa (from (Nigeria) Abuja Football College Academy) |
| — | FW | (South Korea) KOR | Hyeok Jun Lee (from (England) Buckswood School) |

Out: Note: Flags indicate national team as defined under FIFA eligibility rules; some limited exceptions apply. Players may hold more than one non-FIFA nationality.

| No. | Pos. | Nation | Player |
|---|---|---|---|
| 1 | GK | (Latvia) LVA | Vitālijs Meļņičenko (to (Russia) Fakel Voronezh) |
| 2 | DF | (Latvia) LVA | Deniss Bezuščonoks (on loan to Daugavpils) |
| 4 | DF | (Latvia) LVA | Ritus Krjauklis (to Rīgas Futbola skola) |
| 5 | DF | (Latvia) LVA | Vitālijs Barinovs (to Riga FC) |
| 7 | FW | (Latvia) LVA | Daniils Turkovs (to Jelgava) |
| 18 | FW | (Latvia) LVA | Anastasijs Mordatenko (on loan to Daugavpils) |
| 30 | GK | (Latvia) LVA | Reinis Reinholds (to (Italy) Calcio Padova) |
| 37 | MF | (Serbia) SRB | Ivan Dorić (to (Switzerland) Stade Nyonnais) |
| 55 | MF | (Latvia) LVA | Oļegs Laizāns (to Riga FC) |

=== Jelgava ===
In: Note: Flags indicate national team as defined under FIFA eligibility rules; some limited exceptions apply. Players may hold more than one non-FIFA nationality.

| No. | Pos. | Nation | Player |
|---|---|---|---|
| — | GK | (Latvia) LVA | Nils Toms Puriņš (from Skonto) |
| — | DF | (Latvia) LVA | Vitālijs Smirnovs (from Skonto) |
| — | DF | (Latvia) LVA | Vladislavs Sorokins (from Skonto) |
| — | DF | (Latvia) LVA | Viktors Litvinskis (from Daugavpils) |
| — | DF | (Latvia) LVA | Gatis Štrauss (from Šitika Futbola skola) |
| — | MF | (Japan) JPN | Ryotaro Nakano (from Daugavpils) |
| — | MF | (Ukraine) UKR | Kyrylo Silich (from (Estonia) Sillamäe Kalev) |
| — | MF | (Latvia) LVA | Andrejs Kovaļovs (from (Moldova) Dacia Chișinău) |
| — | MF | (Latvia) LVA | Mareks Labanovskis (from METTA/LU) |
| — | FW | (Latvia) LVA | Ēriks Šilings (from Skonto) |
| — | FW | (Estonia) EST | Kevin Kauber (from (Slovenia) NK Krka) |
| — | FW | (Belarus) BLR | Vladislav Klimovich (on loan from (Belarus) BATE Borisov) |
| — | FW | (Latvia) LVA | Daniils Turkovs (from Ventspils) |
| — | FW | (Latvia) LVA | Verners Zalaks (from Daugavpils) |
| — | FW | (Latvia) LVA | Aleksejs Davidenkovs (from Skonto) |
| — | FW | (Latvia) LVA | Oskars Deaks (from JFK Saldus) |

Out: Note: Flags indicate national team as defined under FIFA eligibility rules; some limited exceptions apply. Players may hold more than one non-FIFA nationality.

| No. | Pos. | Nation | Player |
|---|---|---|---|
| 8 | MF | (Russia) RUS | Rustam Sosranov (to (Russia) Baltika Kaliningrad) |
| 9 | MF | (Poland) POL | Dariusz Łatka (to (Poland) Bałtyk Gdynia) |
| 11 | FW | (Russia) RUS | Vyacheslav Sushkin (to (Belarus) FC Vitebsk) |
| 14 | MF | (Latvia) LVA | Edgars Fjodorovs (to Auda) |
| 16 | MF | (Latvia) LVA | Andrejs Kiriļins (to Spartaks) |
| 17 | DF | (Latvia) LVA | Aleksandrs Gubins (to Riga FC) |
| 19 | FW | (Latvia) LVA | Artis Jaudzems (to Spartaks) |
| 20 | FW | (Nigeria) NGA | Ismail Musa (on loan to Auda) |
| 22 | MF | (Nigeria) NGA | Kennedy Eriba (on loan to (Lithuania) Stumbras Kaunas) |
| 25 | DF | (Latvia) LVA | Mārcis Ošs (to (Poland) Górnik Zabrze) |
| 27 | DF | (Cyprus) CYP | Andreas Themistocleous (to (Cyprus) Achyronas Liopetriou) |
| 29 | MF | (Latvia) LVA | Artūrs Pallo (to Valmiera) |

=== Spartaks ===
In: Note: Flags indicate national team as defined under FIFA eligibility rules; some limited exceptions apply. Players may hold more than one non-FIFA nationality.

| No. | Pos. | Nation | Player |
|---|---|---|---|
| — | GK | (Latvia) LVA | Igors Labuts (from (Portugal) Atlético CP) |
| — | GK | (Latvia) LVA | Vladislavs Kurakins (from Daugavpils) |
| — | DF | (Belarus) BLR | Mikalay Kashewski (from (Belarus) FC Vitebsk) |
| — | DF | (Latvia) LVA | Sergejs Kožans (from (Poland) Bytovia Bytów) |
| — | DF | (Latvia) LVA | Toms Rajeckis (from (Germany) SV Stahl Thale)' |
| — | DF | (Latvia) LVA | Madis Miķelsons (from Valmieras FK) |
| — | MF | (Latvia) LVA | Andrejs Kiriļins (from Jelgava) |
| — | MF | (Belarus) BLR | Dzmitry Platonaw (from (Belarus) Torpedo-BelAZ Zhodino) |
| — | MF | (Belarus) BLR | Syarhey Kazeka (from (Belarus) Shakhtyor Soligorsk) |
| — | MF | (Belarus) BLR | Sergey Pushnyakov (from (Belarus) FC Minsk) |
| — | MF | (Finland) FIN | Moshtagh Yaghoubi (from (Finland) RoPS) |
| — | MF | (Kazakhstan) KAZ | Rinat Khairullin (from (Kazakhstan) FC Astana) |
| — | FW | (Latvia) LVA | Vladislavs Kozlovs (from (Estonia) Infonet Tallinn) |
| — | FW | (Brazil) BRA | Felipe Fumaça (from (Russia) Luch-Energiya Vladivostok) |
| — | FW | (Russia) RUS | Yevgeni Kozlov (from (Russia) Dynamo Saint Petersburg) |
| — | FW | (Ivory Coast) CIV | Ridwaru Olatunde Adeyemo (from (Italy) ASD Troina) |
| — | FW | (Latvia) LVA | Artis Jaudzems (from Jelgava) |

Out: Note: Flags indicate national team as defined under FIFA eligibility rules; some limited exceptions apply. Players may hold more than one non-FIFA nationality.

| No. | Pos. | Nation | Player |
|---|---|---|---|
| 1 | GK | (Latvia) LVA | Dmitrijs Grigorjevs (to METTA/LU) |
| 2 | MF | (Ukraine) UKR | Maksym Maksymenko (to (Ukraine) Desna Chernihiv) |
| 3 | DF | (Ukraine) UKR | Dmytro Nazarenko (to (Ukraine) Hoverla Uzhhorod) |
| 4 | DF | (Latvia) LVA | Toms Mežs (to (Norway) Sortland IL) |
| 9 | FW | (Colombia) COL | Kevin Mena (released) |
| 10 | FW | (Latvia) LVA | Edgars Gauračs (on loan to Liepāja) |
| 12 | GK | (Latvia) LVA | Aleksandrs Koliņko (retired) |
| 13 | MF | (Germany) GER | Tyrone Aboagye (to (Germany) Rendsburger TSV) |
| 17 | MF | (Latvia) LVA | Romāns Mickēvičs (to Liepāja) |
| 18 | FW | (Latvia) LVA | Ēriks Punculs (to METTA/LU) |
| 19 | MF | (Finland) FIN | Moshtagh Yaghoubi (on loan to (Kazakhstan) Shakhter Karagandy) |
| 34 | FW | (Ukraine) UKR | Serhiy Silyuk (to (Ukraine) Arsenal Kyiv) |
| 20 | FW | (Germany) GER | Ferdinand Takyi (to (Germany) FC Oberneuland) |
| 77 | GK | (Latvia) LVA | Pāvels Davidovs (to (Belarus) FC Smorgon) |

=== Daugavpils ===
In: Note: Flags indicate national team as defined under FIFA eligibility rules; some limited exceptions apply. Players may hold more than one non-FIFA nationality.

| No. | Pos. | Nation | Player |
|---|---|---|---|
| — | GK | (Latvia) LVA | Aleksandrs Vlasovs (free agent) |
| — | DF | (Latvia) LVA | Deniss Bezuščonoks (on loan from Ventspils) |
| — | DF | (Czech Republic) CZE | Roman Kulikov (from (Czech Republic) Dukla Prague) |
| — | MF | (Portugal) POR | Miguel Cid (from (Finland) Kemi Kings) |
| — | MF | (Azerbaijan) AZE | Orkhan Gurbanli (on loan from (Azerbaijan) Neftchi) |
| — | MF | (Latvia) LVA | Jānis Bovins (from (England) Nostell Miners Welfare) |
| — | MF | (Latvia) LVA | Viktors Bujanovs (from FK Krāslava) |
| — | FW | (Azerbaijan) AZE | Mirabdulla Abbasov (on loan from (Azerbaijan) Neftchi) |
| — | FW | (Latvia) LVA | Anastasijs Mordatenko (on loan from Ventspils) |

Out: Note: Flags indicate national team as defined under FIFA eligibility rules; some limited exceptions apply. Players may hold more than one non-FIFA nationality.

| No. | Pos. | Nation | Player |
|---|---|---|---|
| 4 | MF | (Latvia) LVA | Ņikita Kaļiņins (to Rīgas Futbola skola) |
| 7 | DF | (Latvia) LVA | Artjoms Murdasovs (released) |
| 8 | MF | (Japan) JPN | Ryotaro Nakano (to Jelgava) |
| 9 | FW | (Senegal) SEN | Yoro Lamine Ly (loan return to (Portugal) Boavista) |
| 17 | DF | (Latvia) LVA | Viktors Litvinskis (to Jelgava) |
| 30 | DF | (Ukraine) UKR | Dmytro Makhniev (to (Ukraine) Enerhiya Nova Kakhovka) |
| 35 | GK | (Latvia) LVA | Vladislavs Kurakins (to Spartaks) |
| 99 | FW | (Latvia) LVA | Verners Zalaks (to Jelgava) |

=== METTA/LU ===
In: Note: Flags indicate national team as defined under FIFA eligibility rules; some limited exceptions apply. Players may hold more than one non-FIFA nationality.

| No. | Pos. | Nation | Player |
|---|---|---|---|
| — | GK | (Latvia) LVA | Dmitrijs Grigorjevs (from Spartaks) |
| — | DF | (Russia) RUS | Artjoms Osipovs (from Skonto) |
| — | DF | (Latvia) LVA | Dāvis Sandis Strods (from Skonto) |
| — | DF | (Nigeria) NGA | Hassan Bala (from (Nigeria) Clique Sports Academy) |
| — | DF | (Ghana) GHA | Abraham Anane Ashrifie (from (Ghana) Sporting Club) |
| — | MF | (Latvia) LVA | Mārtiņš Milašēvičs (from Skonto) |
| — | MF | (Lithuania) LTU | Mindaugas Grigaravičius (from (Lithuania) Stumbras Kaunas) |
| — | MF | (Latvia) LVA | Ņikita Pačko (from Rīgas Futbola skola) |
| — | MF | (Latvia) LVA | Krists Kalniņš (from FK Ogre) |
| — | MF | (Latvia) LVA | Māris Riherts (free agent) |
| — | FW | (Nigeria) NGA | Adamu Abdullahi (from (Belgium) KAS Eupen) |
| — | FW | (Latvia) LVA | Ēriks Punculs (from Spartaks) |
| — | FW | (Latvia) LVA | Dāvis Indrāns (from Skonto) |

Out: Note: Flags indicate national team as defined under FIFA eligibility rules; some limited exceptions apply. Players may hold more than one non-FIFA nationality.

| No. | Pos. | Nation | Player |
|---|---|---|---|
| 3 | DF | (Latvia) LVA | Artis Ojārs Ostrovskis (to Tukums 2000) |
| 9 | MF | (Latvia) LVA | Armands Pētersons (to Riga FC) |
| 13 | DF | (Latvia) LVA | Aleksejs Giļņičs (to (Germany) Askania Bernburg) |
| 14 | MF | (Latvia) LVA | Kristaps Priedēns (to Staiceles Bebri) |
| 16 | GK | (Latvia) LVA | Kristers Putniņš (to Alberts) |
| 60 | MF | (Latvia) LVA | Mareks Labanovskis (to Jelgava) |

=== Riga FC ===
In: Note: Flags indicate national team as defined under FIFA eligibility rules; some limited exceptions apply. Players may hold more than one non-FIFA nationality.

| No. | Pos. | Nation | Player |
|---|---|---|---|
| — | GK | (Ukraine) UKR | Ihor Lytovka (from (Romania) FC Voluntari) |
| — | GK | (Russia) RUS | Denis Kniga (on loan from (Russia) FC Tosno) |
| — | DF | (Latvia) LVA | Oļegs Timofejevs (from Skonto) |
| — | DF | (Latvia) LVA | Vitālijs Barinovs (from Ventspils) |
| — | DF | (Latvia) LVA | Aleksandrs Gubins (from Jelgava) |
| — | DF | (Latvia) LVA | Reinis Flaksis (on loan from Liepāja) |
| — | DF | (Latvia) LVA | Dmitrijs Halvitovs (from (Germany) Mecklenburg Schwerin) |
| — | DF | (Russia) RUS | Ivan Knyazev (from (Russia) Ural Sverdlovsk Oblast) |
| — | MF | (Latvia) LVA | Oļegs Laizāns (from Ventspils) |
| — | MF | (Latvia) LVA | Roberts Savaļnieks (on loan from Liepāja) |
| — | MF | (Latvia) LVA | Iļja Šadčins (from Liepāja) |
| — | MF | (Latvia) LVA | Armands Pētersons (from METTA/LU) |
| — | MF | (Sierra Leone) SLE | John Kamara (from (Greece) PAS Lamia 1964) |
| — | MF | (Russia) RUS | Yevgeni Sherenkov (from (Russia) Shkola Myacha Moscow) |
| — | FW | (Japan) JPN | Yōsuke Saitō (from (Belarus) FC Slutsk) |
| — | FW | (Latvia) LVA | Sergejs Vorobjovs (from (Italy) Grumellese Calcio) |
| — | FW | (Ukraine) UKR | Pavlo Fedosov (from (Ukraine) Arsenal Bila Tserkva) |

Out: Note: Flags indicate national team as defined under FIFA eligibility rules; some limited exceptions apply. Players may hold more than one non-FIFA nationality.

| No. | Pos. | Nation | Player |
|---|---|---|---|
| 3 | DF | (Latvia) LVA | Mārcis Savinovs (to Staiceles Bebri) |
| 9 | MF | (Latvia) LVA | Aleksandrs Zeņkovs (to Skonto) |
| 10 | FW | (Latvia) LVA | Aleksejs Bespalovs (to Skonto) |
| 13 | DF | (Latvia) LVA | Viktors Golovizins (to Skonto) |
| 14 | FW | (Latvia) LVA | Andrejs Perepļotkins (to Skonto) |
| 15 | MF | (Latvia) LVA | Jurijs Idionovs (to SK Babīte) |
| 16 | DF | (Latvia) LVA | Viktors Terentjevs (to SK Babīte) |
| 18 | MF | (Latvia) LVA | Raitis Dzelzkalējs (to Skonto) |

=== Rīgas Futbola skola ===
In: Note: Flags indicate national team as defined under FIFA eligibility rules; some limited exceptions apply. Players may hold more than one non-FIFA nationality.

| No. | Pos. | Nation | Player |
|---|---|---|---|
| — | GK | (Latvia) LVA | Germans Māliņš (from Skonto) |
| — | DF | (Latvia) LVA | Ritus Krjauklis (from Ventspils) |
| — | DF | (Ukraine) UKR | Vitaliy Polyanskyi (from (Lithuania) Džiugas Telšiai) |
| — | DF | (Spain) ESP | Juanma (from (Spain) CD Masnou) |
| — | MF | (Latvia) LVA | Aleksejs Višņakovs (from Skonto) |
| — | MF | (Latvia) LVA | Igors Kozlovs (on loan from Skonto) |
| — | MF | (Latvia) LVA | Edgars Jermolajevs (on loan from Skonto) |
| — | MF | (Latvia) LVA | Vjačeslavs Isajevs (from Skonto) |
| — | MF | (Latvia) LVA | Andris Krušatins (on loan from Liepāja) |
| — | MF | (Latvia) LVA | Raivis Andris Jurkovskis (on loan from Liepāja) |
| — | MF | (Latvia) LVA | Ņikita Kaļiņins (from Daugavpils) |
| — | MF | (Russia) RUS | Nika Piliyev (from (Russia) Torpedo Armavir) |
| — | MF | (Ukraine) UKR | Yevgeniy Prokopov (from (Ukraine) Inter Dnipropetrovsk) |
| — | MF | (Latvia) LVA | Kristaps Liepa (from FK Alberts) |
| — | MF | (The Gambia) GAM | Ensa Njie (from (Spain) CD Minera) |
| — | FW | (Lithuania) LTU | Darius Kazubovičius (on loan from (Lithuania) Žalgiris Vilnius) |
| — | FW | (France) FRA | Hicham El Hamdaoui (from (France) OGC Nice) |
| — | FW | (Latvia) LVA | Oskars Rubenis (from SK Babīte) |

Out: Note: Flags indicate national team as defined under FIFA eligibility rules; some limited exceptions apply. Players may hold more than one non-FIFA nationality.

| No. | Pos. | Nation | Player |
|---|---|---|---|
| 3 | MF | (Latvia) LVA | Viktors Kurma (to AFA Olaine) |
| 4 | MF | (Latvia) LVA | Vadims Avdejevs (to SK Babīte) |
| 9 | FW | (Azerbaijan) AZE | Orkhan Hasanaliyev (to AFA Olaine) |
| 20 | DF | (Latvia) LVA | Oto Šeļegovičs (to SK Babīte) |
| 21 | MF | (Latvia) LVA | Ņikita Pačko (to METTA/LU) |

== Notes ==
- Due to long-term debts Skonto FC were not admitted to participation in the 2016 Latvian Higher League. They will play in the Latvian First League.
