= List of Latvian football transfers summer 2016 =

This is a list of Latvian football transfers in the 2016 summer transfer window by club. Only transfers of the Virslīga are included.

All transfers mentioned are shown in the references at the bottom of the page. If you wish to insert a transfer that isn't mentioned there, please add a reference.

== Latvian Higher League ==
=== Liepāja ===
In: Note: Flags indicate national team as defined under FIFA eligibility rules; some limited exceptions apply. Players may hold more than one non-FIFA nationality.

No.	Pos.	Nation	Player
—	DF	(Croatia) CRO	Dino Kluk (from (Croatia) Hrvatski Dragovoljac)
—	DF	(Croatia) CRO	Dario Tomić (from (Croatia) NK Istra 1961)
—	DF	(Nigeria) NGA	Francis Ubong (on loan from JFK Saldus)
—	DF	(Latvia) LVA	Kaspars Gorkšs (from (Czech Republic) Dukla Prague)
—	MF	(Croatia) CRO	Marko Brtan (from (Poland) Wigry Suwałki)

Out: Note: Flags indicate national team as defined under FIFA eligibility rules; some limited exceptions apply. Players may hold more than one non-FIFA nationality.

No.	Pos.	Nation	Player
9	FW	(Latvia) LVA	Dāvis Ikaunieks (on loan to (Czech Republic) Vysočina Jihlava)
10	FW	(Latvia) LVA	Edgars Gauračs (loan return to Spartaks)
14	DF	(Latvia) LVA	Endijs Šlampe (on loan to Rīgas Futbola skola)
24	DF	(Latvia) LVA	Pāvels Mihadjuks (on loan to Spartaks)
33	FW	(Latvia) LVA	Vladimirs Kamešs (to (Russia) Yenisey Krasnoyarsk)

=== Ventspils ===
In: Note: Flags indicate national team as defined under FIFA eligibility rules; some limited exceptions apply. Players may hold more than one non-FIFA nationality.

No.	Pos.	Nation	Player
—	GK	(Latvia) LVA	Ivans Baturins (from (Germany) TuS Koblenz)
—	DF	(Russia) RUS	Yevgeny Postnikov (on loan from (Kazakhstan) FC Astana)
—	MF	(Ghana) GHA	Abdul Rashid Obuobi (from (Serbia) Donji Srem)
—	FW	(Russia) RUS	Aleksei Alekseyev (from (Russia) Baltika Kaliningrad)

Out: Note: Flags indicate national team as defined under FIFA eligibility rules; some limited exceptions apply. Players may hold more than one non-FIFA nationality.

No.	Pos.	Nation	Player
2	DF	(Serbia) SRB	Nenad Vasić (loan return to SK Babīte)
10	FW	(Albania) ALB	Ndue Mujeci (to (Bulgaria) Pirin Blagoevgrad)
17	FW	(Latvia) LVA	Anastasijs Mordatenko (on loan to (Serbia) Radnički Niš, previously on loan at Daugavpils)

=== Jelgava ===
In: Note: Flags indicate national team as defined under FIFA eligibility rules; some limited exceptions apply. Players may hold more than one non-FIFA nationality.

No.	Pos.	Nation	Player
—	DF	(Latvia) LVA	Mārcis Ošs (from (Poland) Górnik Zabrze)
—	MF	(Lithuania) LTU	Mindaugas Grigaravičius (from METTA/LU)
—	MF	(Russia) RUS	Artjoms Osipovs (from METTA/LU)
—	MF	(Latvia) LVA	Andrejs Perepļotkins (from Skonto FC)
—	FW	(Lithuania) LTU	Karolis Laukžemis (from (Lithuania) Sūduva Marijampolė)

Out: Note: Flags indicate national team as defined under FIFA eligibility rules; some limited exceptions apply. Players may hold more than one non-FIFA nationality.

No.	Pos.	Nation	Player
2	DF	(Latvia) LVA	Vladislavs Sorokins (to Rīgas Futbola skola)
17	DF	(Latvia) LVA	Viktors Litvinskis (to Rīgas Futbola skola)
19	FW	(Latvia) LVA	Aleksejs Davidenkovs (to Rīgas Futbola skola)
21	FW	(Belarus) BLR	Vladislav Klimovich (loan return to (Belarus) BATE Borisov)
29	FW	(Estonia) EST	Kevin Kauber (on loan to (Estonia) Levadia Tallinn)

=== Spartaks ===
In: Note: Flags indicate national team as defined under FIFA eligibility rules; some limited exceptions apply. Players may hold more than one non-FIFA nationality.

No.	Pos.	Nation	Player
—	GK	(Lithuania) LTU	Marius Rapalis (from (Lithuania) FK Trakai)
—	GK	(Latvia) LVA	Vladislavs Lazarevs (free agent)
—	DF	(Latvia) LVA	Andrejs Panasjuks (free agent)
—	DF	(Latvia) LVA	Aleksandrs Gubins (from Riga FC)
—	DF	(Latvia) LVA	Pāvels Mihadjuks (on loan from Liepāja)
—	DF	(Moldova) MDA	Constantin Bogdan (from (Moldova) Sheriff Tiraspol)
—	MF	(Croatia) CRO	Tomislav Havojić (from (Croatia) Lučko Zagreb)
—	MF	(Finland) FIN	Moshtagh Yaghoubi (loan return from (Kazakhstan) Shakhter Karagandy)
—	FW	(Latvia) LVA	Edgars Gauračs (loan return from Liepāja)
—	FW	(Latvia) LVA	Daniels Kursietis (from RTU FC)

Out: Note: Flags indicate national team as defined under FIFA eligibility rules; some limited exceptions apply. Players may hold more than one non-FIFA nationality.

No.	Pos.	Nation	Player
1	GK	(Latvia) LVA	Igors Labuts (to SK Babīte)
2	DF	(Latvia) LVA	Madis Miķelsons (to Valmieras FK)
3	DF	(Latvia) LVA	Nauris Bulvītis (to (England) Plymouth Argyle)
4	DF	(Latvia) LVA	Sergejs Kožans (to Riga FC)
13	MF	(Kazakhstan) KAZ	Rinat Khayrullin (loan return to (Kazakhstan) FC Astana)
19	FW	(Italy) ITA	Francesco Vivacqua (released)
20	MF	(Croatia) CRO	Tomislav Havojić (to (Croatia) NK Rudeš)

=== Daugavpils ===
In: Note: Flags indicate national team as defined under FIFA eligibility rules; some limited exceptions apply. Players may hold more than one non-FIFA nationality.

No.	Pos.	Nation	Player
—	GK	(Latvia) LVA	Pāvels Davidovs (from (Belarus) FC Smorgon)
—	DF	(Belarus) BLR	Sergey Tsvetinsky (from (Belarus) FC Slutsk)
—	DF	(Moldova) MDA	Denis Rassulov (from (Moldova) Milsami Orhei)
—	DF	(France) FRA	Cedric Krou (from (England) Northwich Victoria)
—	DF	(United States) USA	Papa Abdoulaye Faly (from (United States) Dallas City)
—	DF	(Russia) RUS	Daniil Melikhov (from (Russia) Krylia Sovetov Samara)
—	MF	(Russia) RUS	Maksim Terentyev (from (Russia) CRFSO Smolensk)
—	MF	(Russia) RUS	Oleg Inkin (from (Armenia) FC Mika)
—	MF	(Russia) RUS	Andrey Belomyttsev (from (Armenia) FC Mika)
—	MF	(Tunisia) TUN	Moez Aloulou (from (Tunisia) OC Kerkennah)
—	MF	(Ivory Coast) CIV	Mamadou Ibrahim Doumbia (from (Ivory Coast) ECAF FC)
—	MF	(Ivory Coast) CIV	Tiemoko Herve Traore (from Salaspils FC)
—	FW	(Moldova) MDA	Serghei Alexeev (from (Moldova) Dinamo-Auto Tiraspol)
—	FW	(Russia) RUS	Alexey Shebanov (from (Russia) Khimik Dzerzhinsk)
—	FW	(Belarus) BLR	Syarhey Krot (from (Belarus) FC Smorgon)
—	FW	(Latvia) LVA	Vitālijs Ziļs (from (Estonia) Sillamäe Kalev)
—	FW	(Russia) RUS	Nikita Podyachev (from (Russia) Krylia Sovetov Samara)
—	FW	(England) ENG	Jamie Matthews (from (England) AFC Fylde)
—	FW	(Ivory Coast) CIV	Steve Dorgeles Zogbo (from Salaspils FC)
—	FW	(Latvia) LVA	Jurijs Halimons (from FK Krāslava)
—	FW	(Nigeria) NGA	John Prince (from (Nigeria) Corinthians Jos)

Out: Note: Flags indicate national team as defined under FIFA eligibility rules; some limited exceptions apply. Players may hold more than one non-FIFA nationality.

No.	Pos.	Nation	Player
4	DF	(Latvia) LVA	Antonijs Černomordijs (to Riga FC, previously on loan at (Poland) Lech Poznań)
8	MF	(Azerbaijan) AZE	Orkhan Gurbanli (loan return to (Azerbaijan) Neftchi)
11	FW	(Latvia) LVA	Ričards Grauze (to FK Auda)
17	FW	(Latvia) LVA	Anastasijs Mordatenko (loan return to Ventspils)
19	FW	(Azerbaijan) AZE	Mirabdulla Abbasov (loan return to (Azerbaijan) Neftchi)
25	DF	(Czech Republic) CZE	Roman Kulikov (released)
30	MF	(Portugal) POR	Miguel Cid (to (Portugal) Gondomar S.C.)

=== METTA/LU ===
In: Note: Flags indicate national team as defined under FIFA eligibility rules; some limited exceptions apply. Players may hold more than one non-FIFA nationality.

No.	Pos.	Nation	Player
—	DF	(Nigeria) NGA	Usman Abbas (from (Nigeria) Heart Abuja)
—	MF	(Latvia) LVA	Konstantīns Fjodorovs (from (Czech Republic) 1. FC Slovácko)
—	MF	(Japan) JPN	Takato Yamazaki (from (Germany) TSG Lübbenau 63)
—	MF	(Japan) JPN	Takumi Miyazaki (from (Japan) Chiba Soccer Club)
—	FW	(Japan) JPN	Akihiro Takada (free agent)

Out: Note: Flags indicate national team as defined under FIFA eligibility rules; some limited exceptions apply. Players may hold more than one non-FIFA nationality.

No.	Pos.	Nation	Player
8	DF	(Latvia) LVA	Ņikita Juhņevičs (to Riga FC)
9	MF	(Lithuania) LTU	Mindaugas Grigaravičius (to Jelgava)
10	FW	(Japan) JPN	Akihiro Takada (to (Armenia) FC Shirak)
11	MF	(Russia) RUS	Artjoms Osipovs (to Jelgava)
18	FW	(Latvia) LVA	Ēriks Punculs (to Riga FC)
20	DF	(Latvia) LVA	Klāvs Bāliņš (to Riga FC)

=== Riga FC ===
In: Note: Flags indicate national team as defined under FIFA eligibility rules; some limited exceptions apply. Players may hold more than one non-FIFA nationality.

No.	Pos.	Nation	Player
—	DF	(Latvia) LVA	Sergejs Kožans (from Spartaks)
—	DF	(Latvia) LVA	Ņikita Juhņevičs (from METTA/LU)
—	DF	(Latvia) LVA	Antonijs Černomordijs (from Daugavpils)
—	DF	(Latvia) LVA	Klāvs Bāliņš (from METTA/LU)
—	DF	(Russia) RUS	Sergei Shumeyko (from (Russia) Torpedo Moscow)
—	DF	(Russia) RUS	Vladislav Khatazhyonkov (from (Russia) Rodina Moscow)
—	MF	(Russia) RUS	Ivan Sergeyev (on loan from (Russia) Strogino Moscow)
—	MF	(Russia) RUS	Ivan Yenin (on loan from (Russia) Vityaz Podolsk)
—	MF	(Sierra Leone) SLE	Bankole Junior Kamara (from (Sierra Leone) Kellie FC)
—	MF	(Ivory Coast) CIV	Kassim Cisse (from (Ivory Coast) Egnanda de Zaranou)
—	FW	(Burkina Faso) BFA	Aristide Bancé (from (South Africa) Chippa United)
—	FW	(Estonia) EST	Bogdan Vastsuk (from (England) Reading)
—	FW	(Latvia) LVA	Ēriks Punculs (from METTA/LU)
—	FW	(Nigeria) NGA	Same James Audu (from (Nigeria) DSS FC)

Out: Note: Flags indicate national team as defined under FIFA eligibility rules; some limited exceptions apply. Players may hold more than one non-FIFA nationality.

No.	Pos.	Nation	Player
5	DF	(Latvia) LVA	Dmitrijs Daņilovs (to SK Babīte)
6	DF	(Latvia) LVA	Reinis Flaksis (to Rīgas Futbola skola)
7	MF	(Latvia) LVA	Alekss Regža (to AFA Olaine)
17	DF	(Russia) RUS	Vladislav Khatazhyonkov (to (Russia) Rodina Moscow)
18	DF	(Latvia) LVA	Dmitrijs Halvitovs (to (Norway) Sandnessjøen IL)
21	MF	(Latvia) LVA	Iļja Šadčins (to Rīgas Futbola skola)
77	DF	(Latvia) LVA	Aleksandrs Gubins (to Spartaks)
34	FW	(Ukraine) UKR	Pavlo Fedosov (on loan to (Ukraine) PFC Sumy)

=== Rīgas Futbola skola ===
In: Note: Flags indicate national team as defined under FIFA eligibility rules; some limited exceptions apply. Players may hold more than one non-FIFA nationality.

No.	Pos.	Nation	Player
—	GK	(Latvia) LVA	Deniss Romanovs (from (Indonesia) Madura United)
—	DF	(Latvia) LVA	Vitālijs Topčijevs (free agent)
—	DF	(Latvia) LVA	Reinis Flaksis (from Riga FC)
—	DF	(Latvia) LVA	Endijs Šlampe (on loan from Liepāja)
—	DF	(Latvia) LVA	Vladislavs Sorokins (from Jelgava)
—	DF	(Latvia) LVA	Viktors Litvinskis (from Jelgava)
—	MF	(Latvia) LVA	Ņikita Kovaļonoks (from (Germany) VFC Plauen)
—	MF	(Latvia) LVA	Iļja Šadčins (from Riga FC)
—	MF	(Latvia) LVA	Daniils Hvoiņickis (from AFA Olaine)
—	MF	(Georgia (country)) GEO	Giorgi Diakvnishvili (from Caramba Rīga)
—	FW	(Latvia) LVA	Aleksejs Davidenkovs (from Jelgava)

Out: Note: Flags indicate national team as defined under FIFA eligibility rules; some limited exceptions apply. Players may hold more than one non-FIFA nationality.

No.	Pos.	Nation	Player
3	DF	(Ukraine) UKR	Vitaliy Polyanskyi (to (Lithuania) Utenis Utena)
5	DF	(Latvia) LVA	Igors Barinovs (to AFA Olaine)
7	MF	(Latvia) LVA	Maksims Vasiļjevs (to SK Babīte)
16	GK	(Latvia) LVA	Hugo Puriņš (on loan to FK Auda)
20	FW	(Latvia) LVA	Aleksejs Rosoha (to SK Babīte)
22	FW	(Latvia) LVA	Ņikita Ivanovs (loan return to Skonto FC)
