= Sushkin =

Sushkin (Russian: Сушкин) is a Russian masculine surname, its feminine counterpart is Sushkina. Notable people with the surname include:

- Petr Sushkin (1868–1928), Russian ornithologist
- Vyacheslav Sushkin (born 1991), Russian footballer
