= Aleksejs Grjaznovs =

Latvian footballer (born 1997)

Personal information
- Full name: Aleksejs Grjaznovs
- Date of birth: 1 October 1997 (age 29)
- Place of birth: Riga, Latvia
- Height: 1.79 m (5 ft 10 in)
- Position: Midfielder

Team information
- Current team: Grobiņa
- Number: 97

Senior career*
Years	Team	Apps	(Gls)
2013–2017	RFS	6	(0)
2017	→ Babīte (loan)	9	(0)
2017–2018	RTU		
2019–2020	Valmiera	21	(1)
2020	Jelgava	6	(2)
2021	Noah Jūrmala	12	(1)
2021	Sokol Brozany	1	(0)
2021	Slovan Velvary	7	(0)
2022	Noah	7	(0)
2022–2023	Liepāja	31	(0)
2024	Super Nova	9	(1)
2024	Mladost Novi Sad	14	(0)
2025	GFK Dubočica	8	(0)
2025–	Grobiņa	14	(1)

International career^{‡}
2013–2014	Latvia U17	3	(0)
2014	Latvia U18	1	(1)
2015	Latvia U19	3	(0)
2019	Latvia	1	(0)
- * Club domestic league appearances and goals as of 17 November 2025 ‡ National team caps and goals as of 20 November 2019

Aleksejs Grjaznovs (born 1 October 1997) is a Latvian footballer who plays as a midfielder for Grobiņa.

== Career ==
=== Club ===
On 25 December, Noah announced the signing of Grjaznovs.

=== International ===
Grjaznovs made his international debut for Latvia on 19 November 2019 in a UEFA Euro 2020 qualifying match against Austria, which finished as a 1–0 home win.

== Career statistics ==
=== International ===
As of 19 November 2019

Latvia
Year	Apps	Goals
2019	1	0
Total	1	0
