= Aleksejs Saveļjevs =

Latvian footballer (born 1999)

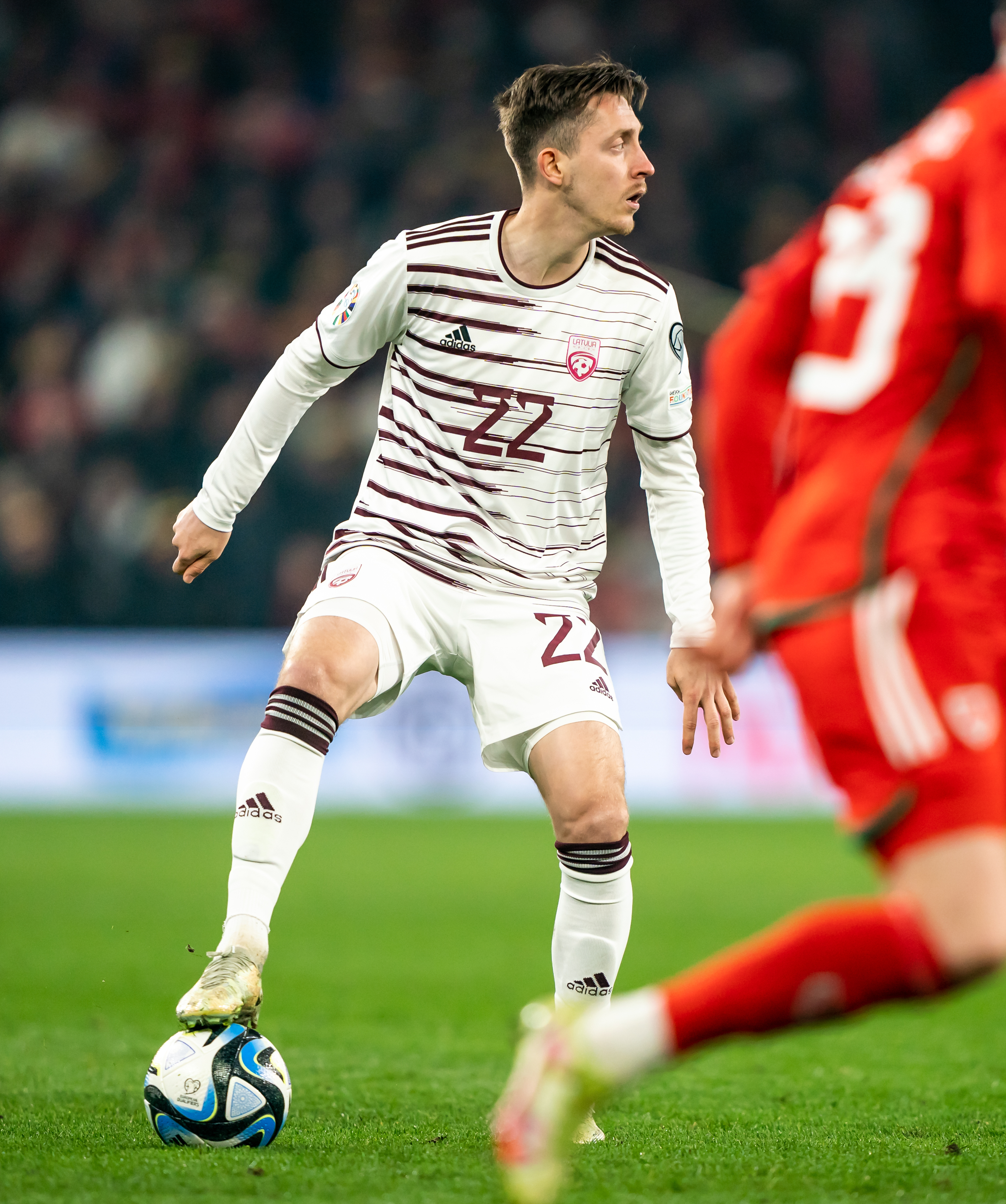

Personal information
- Date of birth: 30 January 1999 (age 27)
- Place of birth: Riga, Latvia
- Height: 1.84 m (6 ft 0 in)
- Position: Midfielder

Team information
- Current team: Asia Talas
- Number: 14

Youth career
- –2015: Skonto
- 2016: RTU
- 2016: Babīte
- 2017–2018: Švyturys Marijampolė
- 2017–2018: → Hellas Verona (loan)
- 2018–2019: Hellas Verona

Senior career*
Years	Team	Apps	(Gls)
2017	Babīte	10	(3)
2019–2020	Hellas Verona	0	(0)
2020	→ Rende (loan)	6	(1)
2020–2021	Mantova	15	(1)
2021–2022	Riga	6	(0)
2022	→ Auda (loan)	28	(1)
2023–2024	Auda	65	(7)
2025	Gloria Buzău	11	(0)
2025–2026	Liepāja	10	(0)
2026–	Asia Talas	1	(0)

International career^{‡}
2015	Latvia U16	3	(0)
2015	Latvia U17	6	(0)
2016	Latvia U18	3	(1)
2016–2018	Latvia U19	30	(2)
2018–2020	Latvia U21	17	(0)
2020–	Latvia	38	(1)
- * Club domestic league appearances and goals as of 15 March 2026 ‡ National team caps and goals as of 8 October 2026

Aleksejs Saveļjevs (born 30 January 1999) is a Latvian professional footballer who plays as a midfielder for Kyrgyz Premier League club Asia Talas, and for the Latvia national team.

== Club career ==
He started his senior career in the Latvian Higher League with Babīte in 2017. The club was excluded from the league for match fixing and he returned to junior football.

On 11 August 2017, he joined Italian club Verona on loan with an option to buy and was assigned to the club's under-19 squad. On 30 May 2018, Verona exercised their option to purchased his rights, and he signed a 3-year contract with the club. In the 2018–19 season, he continued to play for Verona's youth team. He received two call-ups to the senior squad (once in Serie B and once in Coppa Italia), but did not appear on the field.

On 31 January 2020, he joined Serie C club Rende on loan. He made his professional debut on 9 February 2020 in a game against Paganese. On 16 February, he scored his first professional goal, an added-time equalizer in a 2–2 draw against Potenza. On 26 February, he made his first start against Cavese. After two more games, the season was abandoned due to the COVID-19 pandemic in Italy.

On 14 September, he signed with Serie C club Mantova.

On 16 July 2021, he returned to Latvia and signed with Riga.

On 9 March 2022, he was loaned to FK Auda for a season.

== International career ==
He amassed 50 appearances for Latvia on different junior levels. In November 2018, he was called up for the first time to the senior Latvia national football team for the 2018–19 UEFA Nations League games against Kazakhstan and Andorra, but remained on the bench on that occasion.
Seveljevs made his first appearance for Latvia on 11 November 2020 in the Friendly match against San Marino.

== Career statistics ==
=== International ===
As of 10 June 2025

Appearances and goals by national team and year
National team	Year	Apps	Goals
Latvia	2020	3	0
Latvia	2021	3	1
Latvia	2022	2	0
Latvia	2023	8	0
Latvia	2024	9	0
Latvia	2025	4	0
Total		29	1

Scores and results list Latvia's goal tally first, score column indicates score after each Saveļjevs goal.

List of international goals scored by Aleksejs Saveļjevs
No.	Date	Venue	Opponent	Score	Result	Competition
1	7 June 2021	Merkur Spiel-Arena, Düsseldorf, Germany	Germany	1–6	1–7	Friendly

== Honours ==
Auda

- Latvian Cup: 2022
