= Ivans Lukjanovs =

Latvian footballer

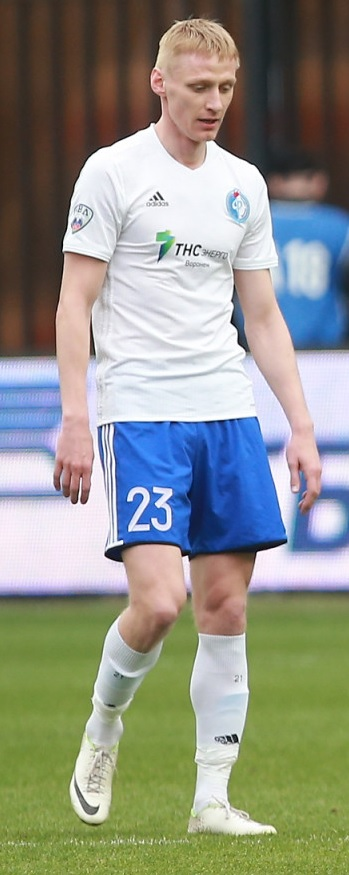
- Lukjanovs with Fakel in 2017

Personal information
- Full name: Ivans Lukjanovs
- Date of birth: 24 January 1987 (age 39)
- Place of birth: Daugavpils, Latvian SSR, Soviet Union
- Height: 1.84 m (6 ft 0 in)
- Positions: Winger; forward

Team information
- Current team: Riga FC (youth coach)

Youth career
- JFC Skonto

Senior career*
Years	Team	Apps	(Gls)
2006–2009	Skonto FC	17	(14)
2007–2008	→ Olimps Rīga (loan)	10	(2)
2008	→ FK Šiauliai (loan)	12	(1)
2008–2009	→ FK Sūduva (loan)	12	(5)
2009–2012	Lechia Gdańsk	77	(5)
2012–2013	Metalurh Zaporizhya	4	(0)
2013	Volgar Astrakhan	10	(2)
2013–2014	Rotor Volgograd	18	(1)
2014–2016	Volgar Astrakhan	48	(8)
2016–2018	Fakel Voronezh	53	(3)
2018–2020	Riga FC	16	(6)
2020	RFS	8	(0)

International career
2008	Latvia U21	10	(2)
2010–2018	Latvia	17	(0)

Managerial career
- Riga FC (youth)
- * Club domestic league appearances and goals

Ivans Lukjanovs (born 24 January 1987) is a Latvian former professional footballer who played as a winger.

== Club career ==
Lukjanovs was born in Daugavpils, Latvian SSR, Soviet Union. As a youth player he played for JFC Skonto, making his first first-team appearance in 2006. That season he played 2 matches, scoring no goals. In November 2006 Lukjanovs and his team-mate Oļegs Laizāns went on a training camp together with the Italian giants Lazio, but didn't stay with the club. His further career led through loans to another club from Riga Olimps/RFS and two Lithuanian clubs. He played 10 matches and scored 2 goals for Olimps/RFS in 2008. During his time in Lithuania Lukjanovs played 12 matches, scoring 1 goal for FK Šiauliai and 12 matches, scoring 5 goals for FK Sūduva. In 2009 Lukjanovs returned to the Latvian Higher League side Skonto FC and managed to score 14 goals in 15 matches.

After a few months he and his team-mate Sergejs Kožans joined the Polish Ekstraklasa club Lechia Gdańsk. In his first season with Lechia Lukjanovs played 29 matches, scoring 2 goals. In his second season there he had the same statistics – 2 goals in 29 games. The third season saw Lukjanovs playing less – 1 goal in 19 league matches. After the season Lukjanovs was released from the club alongside Sergejs Kožans.

On 18 August 2012, Lukjanovs moved to the Ukrainian Premier League club Metalurh Zaporizhya. Despite playing a great debut match at the club, Lukjanovs was rarely used throughout the season. He played only 4 games for the team and, furthermore, was sharply criticized by the manager Vitaliy Kvartsyanyi for being too afraid of playing aggressively and not having a character. In December 2012 Lukjanovs revealed that he would not stay at the club anymore.

On 28 February 2013, he signed a contract with the Russian National Football League club Volgar Astrakhan. Lukjanovs scored 2 goals in 10 matches for the club, but couldn't help it save a place in the league, as they got relegated to the Russian Second Division. Lukjanovs left the club after the relegation. On 13 July 2013, he joined Rotor Volgograd, being complimented by the club's vice-president for his speed and ability to play equally well with both feet.

== International career ==
Lukjanovs played 10 matches and scored 2 goals for Latvia U-21 in 2008. In January 2010 he was firstly called up to the senior side for a friendly match against South Korea. As of November 2013 Lukjanovs has made 15 international appearances for Latvia, scoring no goals yet.

== Honours ==
=== International ===
- Baltic Cup: 2012
