= Akihiro Takada =

Japanese shogi player (born 2002)

- Native name: 高田明浩
- Born: June 2, 2002 (age 24)
- Hometown: Kakamigahara, Gifu, Japan
- Nationality: Japanese

Career
- Achieved professional status: April 1, 2021 (aged 18)
- Badge number: 328
- Rank: 5-dan
- Teacher: Nobuo Mori (7-dan)
- Meijin class: C1
- Ryūō class: 5

Websites
- JSA profile page

Akihiro Takada (高田 明浩, Takada Akihiro; born June 20, 2002) is a Japanese professional shogi player ranked 5-dan.

== Early life and apprenticeship ==
Takada was born in Kakamigahara, Gifu, Japan on June 20, 2002. He learned how to play shogi when he was third-grade elementary school student.

Takada entered the Japan Shogi Association's apprentice school in September 2014 as a student of shogi professional Nobuo Mori. Takada was promoted to the rank of apprentice professional 3-dan in April 2020 and obtained full professional status and the rank of 4-dan after tying for first place in the 68th 3-dan League (October 2020 – March 2021) with a record of 13 wins and 5 losses.

== Shogi professional ==
=== Promotion history ===
The promotion history for Takada is as follows.

- 6-kyū: September 2014
- 3-dan: April 2020
- 4-dan: April 1, 2021
- 5-dan: March 12, 2024
