= Vjačeslavs Kudrjavcevs =

Latvian footballer (born 1998)

Personal information
- Date of birth: 30 March 1998 (age 28)
- Place of birth: Riga, Latvia
- Height: 1.88 m (6 ft 2 in)
- Position: Goalkeeper

Team information
- Current team: Grobiņa
- Number: 1

Youth career
- Tukums

Senior career*
Years	Team	Apps	(Gls)
2014	Tukums	6	(0)
2014–2016	Jūrmala	2	(0)
2016–2017	Babīte	12+	(0+)
2017	→ Riga (loan)	0	(0)
2018–2019	Legia Warsaw	0	(0)
2018–2019	Legia Warsaw II	19	(0)
2019	Ventspils	4	(0)
2020–2021	Stomil Olsztyn	16	(0)
2021	→ Widzew Łódź (loan)	5	(0)
2021–2022	Valmiera	1	(0)
2022	Liepāja	0	(0)
2023–2024	Super Nova	20	(0)
2024	Jelgava	32	(0)
2025	Phönix Lübeck	0	(0)
2026–	Grobiņa	16	(0)

International career
2016	Latvia U19	2	(0)
2020	Latvia U21	4	(0)
- * Club domestic league appearances and goals as of 12 November 2026

Vjačeslavs Kudrjavcevs (born 30 March 1998) is a Latvian professional footballer who plays as a goalkeeper for Grobiņa.

== Career ==
At the age of 16, Kudrajavcevs debuted for Jūrmala in the Latvian top flight. After that, he signed for second division side Babīte, helping them achieve promotion before being sent on loan to top flight club Riga, where he failed to make a league appearance.

For the second half of the 2017–18 season, Kudrajavcevs signed for Legia Warsaw, the most successful Polish team, where he again failed to make an appearance for the senior team.

In early 2020, he joined Polish I liga club Stomil Olsztyn.
