= Renārs Rode =

Latvian footballer (born 1989)

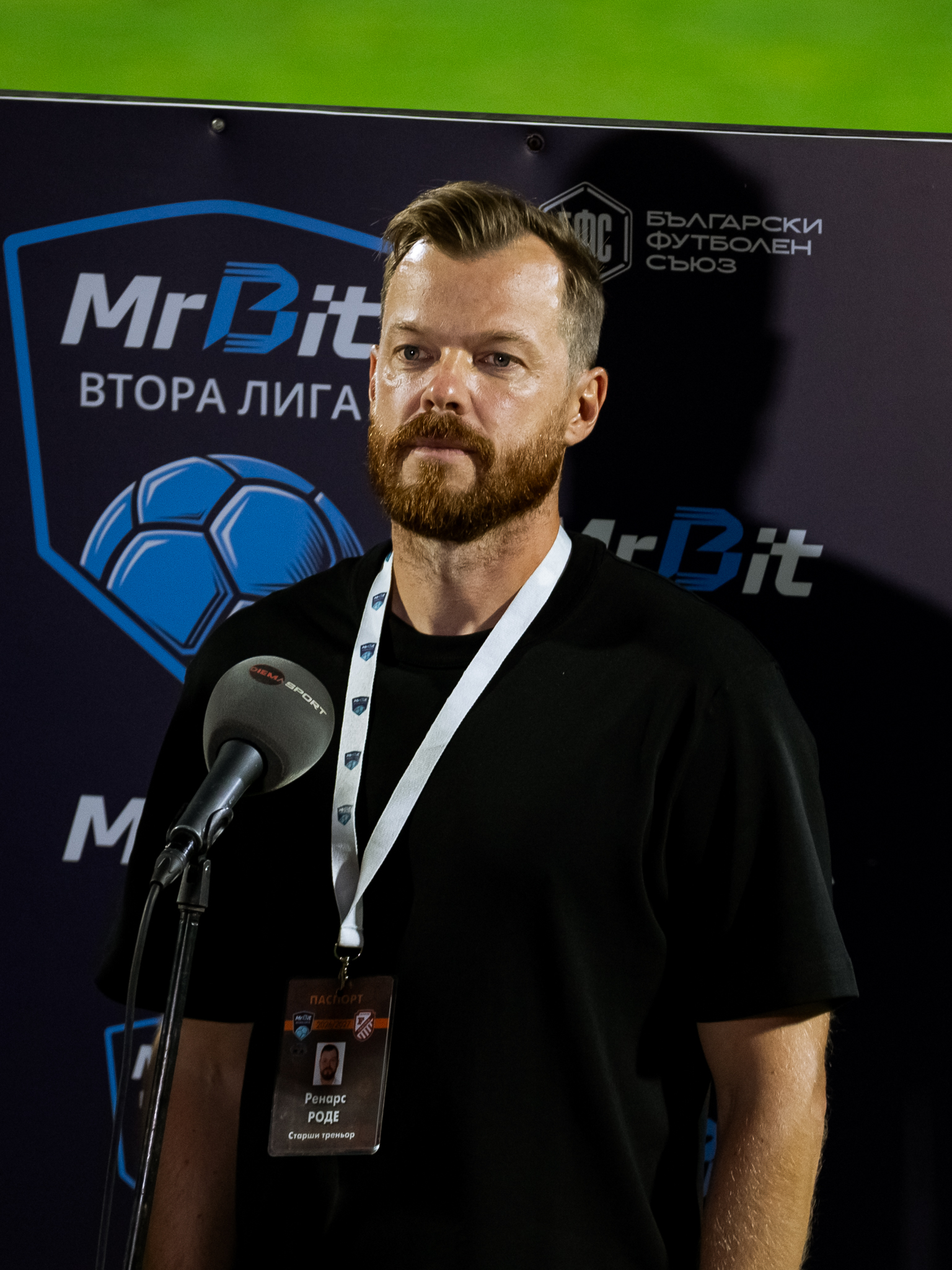

Personal information
- Full name: Renārs Rode
- Date of birth: April 6, 1989 (age 37)
- Place of birth: Riga, Latvian SSR, Soviet Union (now Republic of Latvia)
- Height: 1.88 m (6 ft 2 in)
- Position: Centre-back

Team information
- Current team: Fratria (manager)

Youth career
- Skonto

Senior career*
Years	Team	Apps	(Gls)
2008–2009	Olimps	15	(1)
2010–2013	Skonto	90	(10)
2014	Teplice	0	(0)
2014	Ventspils	14	(1)
2015	Skonto	23	(1)
2016	Sigma Olomouc	2	(0)
2016	Cape Town City	4	(0)
2017	Rīgas	11	(0)
2018	Negeri Sembilan	8	(0)
2018	Waterford	0	(0)
2019	Jelgava	25	(1)
2020–2022	Alberts	4	(0)

International career
2009–2010	Latvia U-21	9	(1)
2013–2014	Latvia	4	(1)

Managerial career
- 2020–2022: Alberts (assistant)
- 2022–2024: Valmiera (assistant)
- 2022–2023: Valmiera II
- 2024–2025: Visakha (assistant)
- 2025: Auda (assistant)
- 2026–: Fratria
- * Club domestic league appearances and goals

Renārs Rode (born 6 April 1989 in Riga) is a Latvian football manager and retired professional footballer who played as a centre-back, who currently works as manager at Bulgarian club Fratria. He has also been capped by the Latvia national football team.

== Club career ==
=== Skonto Riga ===
As a youth player Renārs Rode played for the Skonto Riga academy. In 2008, he joined the Latvian Higher League club JFK Olimps, and played 15 matches, scoring his first league goal in a 7–0 victory over Daugava Rīga on 8 July 2009. In 2010 Rode moved to Skonto Rīga. During his first season at the club, he scored 3 goals in 16 league matches and under the manager Aleksandrs Starkovs became the champion of the Latvian Higher League. In 2011, he helped the club win the Baltic League and in 2012 won his first Latvian Cup with Skonto. In January 2012 it was announced that Rode would go on trial with the Scottish Premiership club Heart of Midlothian alongside his teammate Armandrs Pētersons, but the potential move fell through. After the 2013 Latvian Higher League season Rode was included in the sportacentrs.com and Sporta Avīze teams of the tournament, having appeared in 25 league matches and scored 3 goals, with Skonto suffering only one loss throughout the season. All in all, during his four seasons with the club Rode played 90 league matches, scoring 10 goals, and appeared in two UEFA Champions League and eight UEFA Europa League matches.

=== FK Teplice ===
On 10 December 2013 it was announced that Rode had signed a two-year contract with the Czech Gambrinus Liga club FK Teplice after a successful trial period. Rode left the club in March 2014 having been given a notice of contract termination after the arrival of the newly appointed manager. Following the release Rode went on trial with the Norwegian Tippeligaen side Sarpsborg 08, but did not stay with the club.

=== FK Ventspils ===
On 17 July 2014 Rode returned to the Latvian Higher League, signing a contract with the title holders FK Ventspils. He helped the club retain the title for the second year in a row.

=== Return to Skonto ===
Prior to the 2015 Latvian Higher League season Rode moved to his former club Skonto Riga. He participated in the UEFA Europa League qualifying stages helping his club beat the Irish club St Patrick's Athletic. Rode scored a goal in the next qualifying round which saw Skonto losing hopelessly against the Hungarian side Debreceni VSC.

=== SK Sigma Olomouc ===
Following the 2015 season Rode went on trial with the Premier Soccer League club Mpumalanga Black Aces. However, it was later announced that he would not be joining the team at that particular time and that the coach considered a potential move for Rode during the next transfer period. In February 2016 Rode joined the Czech First League club SK Sigma Olomouc signing a half-year contract with an option to extend it for another year.

=== FK Jelgava ===
On 16 December 2018, Rode signed with FK Jelgava for one year.

=== Later career ===
In the beginning of 2020, Rode joined JDFS Alberts. In June 2020, Rode announced his retirement from professional football and a few days later, JDFS Alberts confirmed that Rode had been appointed assistant coach of the club.

== Managerial career ==
Rode started his career as an assistant at JDFS Alberts. In 2022 he became assistant of Jurģis Kalns in Valmiera. He also managed their second team. In 2024 he moved to Visakha, to work as assistant of Kalns, later moving with him to Auda. In November 2025, after 4 years working as assistant for Kalns, he decided to look for main career. On 17 March 2026 he was announced as the new manager of Bulgarian Second League club Fratria.

== International career ==
Rode was a member of Latvia national under-21 football team. He received his first full international call-up under that time manager Aleksandrs Starkovs on 22 January 2010 for a friendly match against South Korea. His next call-up came just 3 years later, when he was included in the national squad for a friendly match against Estonia on 14 August 2013 by the newly appointed Marians Pahars. Rode made his full international debut for Latvia on 6 September 2013 in a 2–1 2014 World Cup qualifying victory over Lithuania. He scored his first international goal on 15 October 2013 in a WC qualifying match against Slovakia, securing Latvia a point with a late goal in a 2–2 draw.

=== International goals ===
Scores and results list Latvia's goal tally first.

#	Date	Venue	Opponent	Score	Result	Competition
1	15 October 2013	Skonto Stadium, Riga, Latvia	Slovakia	2–2	2–2	2014 FIFA World Cup qualification
Last updated 22 December 2013

== Honours ==
- Skonto FC
  - Latvian Higher League champion (1): 2010
  - Baltic League champion (1): 2011
  - Latvian Cup winner (1): 2012
- FK Ventspils
  - Latvian Higher League champion (1): 2014
