= Pavel Mochalin =

Russian footballer

Personal information
- Full name: Pavel Aleksandrovich Mochalin
- Date of birth: 16 January 1989 (age 37)
- Place of birth: Leningrad, Russian SFSR
- Height: 1.85 m (6 ft 1 in)
- Position: Defender

Youth career
- 1996–2005: DYuSSh Smena-Zenit

Senior career*
Years	Team	Apps	(Gls)
2005–2009	FC Zenit Saint Petersburg	0	(0)
2010	PFC Spartak Nalchik	0	(0)
2011	FK Ventspils	6	(0)
2012–2013	FC Rus Saint Petersburg	19	(1)
2013–2015	FC SKA-Energiya Khabarovsk	18	(0)
2016	FC Zvezda Saint Petersburg (amateur)		
2017	SK Babīte	4	(1)

International career
2005–2006	Russia U-17	9	(1)
2007–2008	Russia U-19	7	(1)
2009	Russia U-21	2	(0)
- * Club domestic league appearances and goals

Pavel Aleksandrovich Mochalin (Russian: Павел Александрович Мочалин; born 16 January 1989) is a Russian former football defender.

== Club career ==
He played two seasons in the Russian Football National League for FC SKA-Energiya Khabarovsk.
