= Adebayo Adigun =

Nigerian footballer (born 1990)

Adebayo Adigun junior
Personal information
- Date of birth: 15 November 1990 (age 36)
- Place of birth: Ibadan, Nigeria
- Height: 1.83 m (6 ft 0 in)
- Position: Defender

Youth career
- Shooting Stars

Senior career*
Years	Team	Apps	(Gls)
2006–2008	Shooting Stars FC	18	(4)
2009	Kashiwa Reysol	0	(0)
2010	Tokyo Verdy	15	(0)
2012–2014	Bylis Ballsh	26	(3)
2014	Al Tahaddy	25	(3)
2015	Sunshine Stars FC	23	(5)
2016–17	FK Ventspils	20	(3)
- * Club domestic league appearances and goals as of 4 March 2016

Adebayo Adigun (born 15 November 1990) is a Nigerian former football player.

Adigun began his career with Shooting Stars F.C. and signed on 6 December 2009 a three years contract with the J1 League club Kashiwa Reysol. Adebayo Adigun retired from football in 2017.

== Personal life ==
He is the son of the former international Bunmi Adigun.
