= Daniils Turkovs =

Latvian footballer

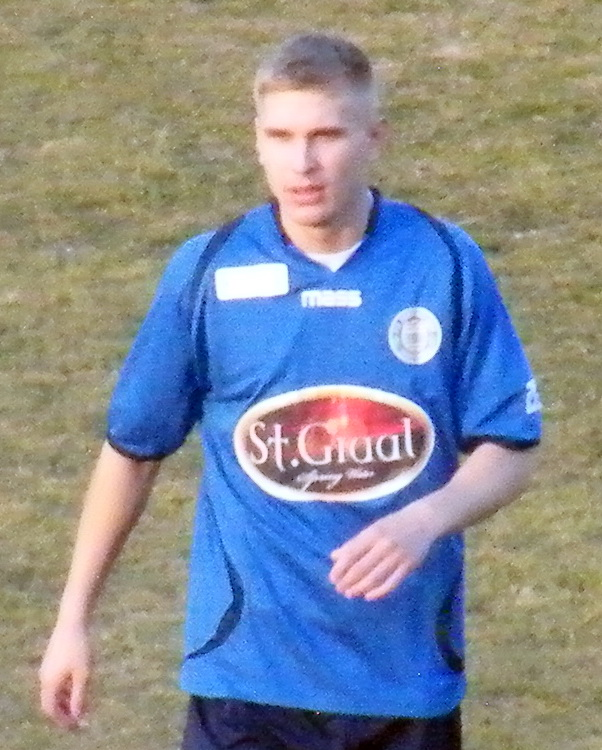
- Turkovs playing for ZTE

Personal information
- Full name: Daniils Turkovs
- Date of birth: 17 February 1988 (age 38)
- Place of birth: Jūrmala, Latvian SSR, Soviet Union (now Republic of Latvia)
- Height: 1.80 m (5 ft 11 in)
- Position: Forward

Youth career
- JFC Skonto

Senior career*
Years	Team	Apps	(Gls)
2007–2009	Olimps/RFS	47	(9)
2010	Skonto FC	17	(8)
2011–2012	Zalaegerszegi	26	(6)
2012–2013	Ventspils	57	(23)
2014	GKS Bełchatów	17	(2)
2015	Ventspils	19	(3)
2016	Jelgava	13	(2)
2017–2018	Riga	10	(1)

International career
2004–2005	Latvia U17	6	(0)
2006	Latvia U19	3	(1)
2009–2010	Latvia U21	9	(2)
2010–2013	Latvia	4	(0)
- * Club domestic league appearances and goals

Daniils Turkovs (born 17 February 1988) is a Latvian former professional footballer who played as a forward.

== Club career ==
As a youth player, Turkovs played for Skonto FC academy, starting his professional career in 2007 with Olimps/RFS. Over a period of three seasons, Turkovs played 47 matches in the Latvian Higher League, scoring nine goals. In 2010, he was one of several Olimps/RFS players brought to Skonto FC by the newly appointed manager Aleksandrs Starkovs. He scored eight goals in 17 matches, helping the team win the championship.

After the season, Turkovs went on trial with the Hungarian Nemzeti Bajnokság I club Zalaegerszegi and signed a four-year contract with them in January 2011. Playing in Hungary for two seasons, Turkovs appeared in 26 league matches, scoring six goals.

In March 2012, he returned to the Latvian Higher League, joining then champions Ventspils. During two seasons Turkovs played 57 league games and scored 23 goals. In 2013, he helped his club become the champions of Latvia and also win the Latvian Cup. After the season, he was included in the sportacentrs.com team of the tournament. On 9 December 2013, it was announced that Turkovs had joined the Polish I liga club GKS Bełchatów on a half-year contract.

== International career ==
Turkovs was a member of all youth national teams, including Latvia U17, Latvia U19 and Latvia U21. He made his full international debut on 17 November 2010 in a friendly match against China, starting the game in the first eleven and being replaced in the 76th minute by Vladislavs Kozlovs. In total, Turkovs earned four international caps, scoring no goals.

== Honours ==
Skonto FC

- Latvian Higher League: 2010

Ventspils

- Latvian Higher League: 2013
- Latvian Cup: 2012–13
