= Raivis Jurkovskis =

Latvian footballer (born 1996)

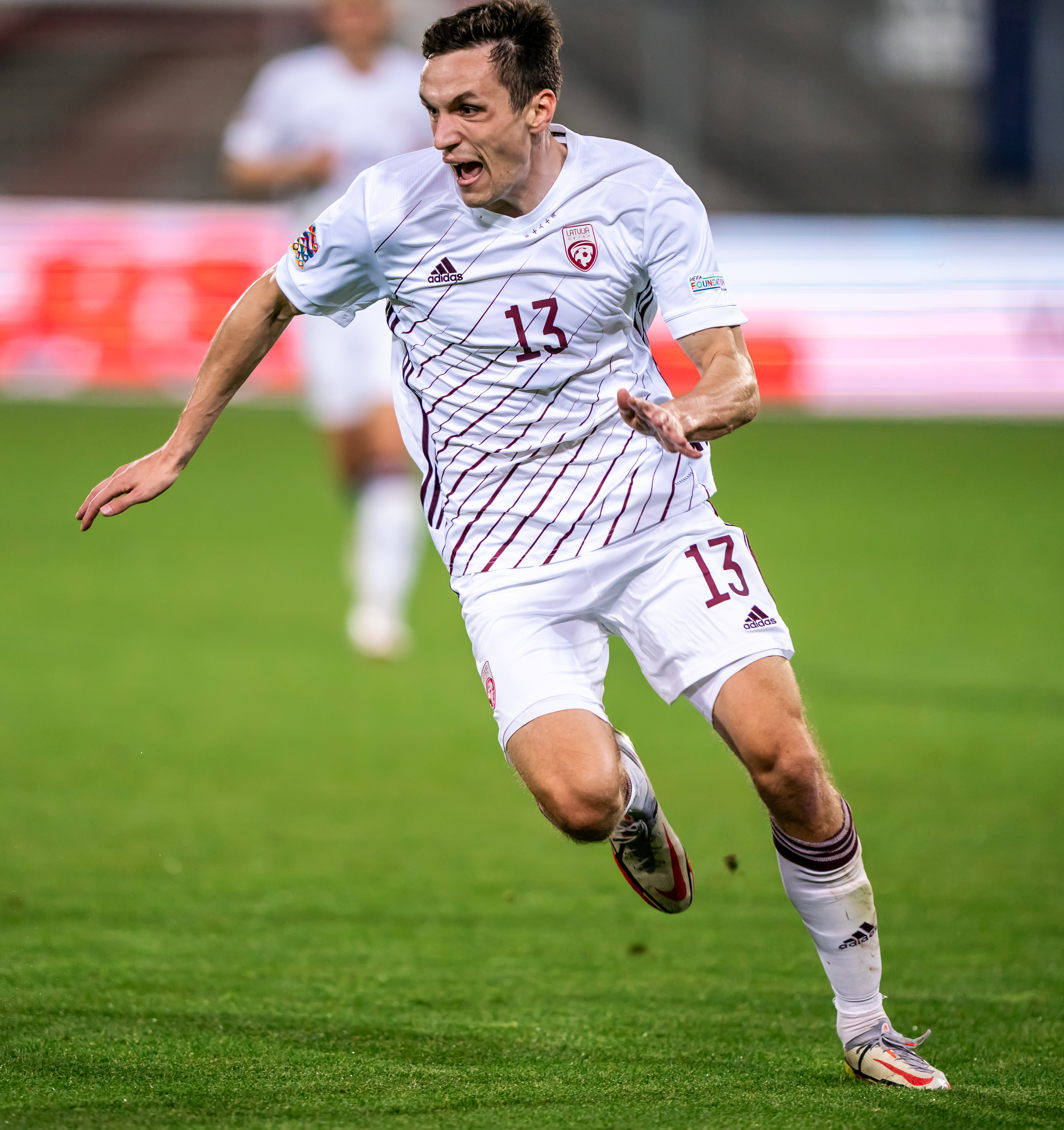

Personal information
- Full name: Raivis Andris Jurkovskis
- Date of birth: 7 December 1996 (age 29)
- Place of birth: Liepāja, Latvia
- Height: 1.87 m (6 ft 2 in)
- Position: Left-back

Team information
- Current team: Riga
- Number: 13

Youth career
- FK Liepājas Metalurgs

Senior career*
Years	Team	Apps	(Gls)
2013	Liepājas Metalurgs 2		
2014–2015	FK Liepāja	15	(2)
2016	FK RFS	27	(6)
2017–2020	FK Liepāja	91	(7)
2021	Dundalk	29	(0)
2022–	Riga	154	(9)

International career^{‡}
2014	Latvia U19	18	(1)
2015–2018	Latvia U21	21	(1)
2018–	Latvia	67	(0)
- * Club domestic league appearances and goals as of 12 November 2026 ‡ National team caps and goals as of 15 November 2026

Raivis Andris Jurkovskis (born 7 December 1996) is a Latvian professional footballer who plays as a left-back for Vīrisliga club Riga and the Latvia national team.

== Club career ==
Born in Liepāja, he has played club football for Liepājas Metalurgs 2, FK Liepāja and FK RFS. In January 2021 he signed for Irish club Dundalk. In December 2021, it was announced that Jurkovskis had returned to Latvia to sign for Riga.

== International career ==
After playing for multiple Latvia national youth teams, he made his senior international debut for the Latvia in 2018.
