= Andrejs Kiriļins =

Latvian footballer

Personal information
- Full name: Andrejs Kiriļins
- Date of birth: 3 November 1995 (age 31)
- Place of birth: Latvia
- Height: 1.73 m (5 ft 8 in)
- Position: Midfielder

Team information
- Current team: Dinamo Rīga
- Number: 20

Senior career*
Years	Team	Apps	(Gls)
2013	Liepājas Metalurgs	19	(1)
2014	Jelgava	24	(0)
2015	ViOn Zlaté Moravce	4	(0)
2015	Jelgava	12	(1)
2016	Spartaks Jūrmala	21	(2)
2017–2018	Jelgava	23	(0)
2019	Spartaks Jūrmala	0	(0)
2019	Palanga	9	(1)
2020	SV 90 Altengottern	1	(1)
2020–	Dinamo Rīga	4	(3)

International career
2011–2012	Latvia U17	3	(0)
2013–2014	Latvia U19	3	(0)
2015–2016	Latvia U21	10	(0)
- * Club domestic league appearances and goals as of 2 August 2020

Andrejs Kiriļins (born 3 November 1995) is a Latvian footballer who plays for Palanga.

== Club career ==
=== FC ViOn Zlaté Moravce ===
Kiriļins made his professional Fortuna Liga debut for ViOn Zlaté Moravce on 4 April 2015 against Ružomberok.

=== FK Palanga ===
After a short spell at Spartaks Jūrmala, Kiriļins became a member of Lithuanian Palanga in the summer 2019. First match for new club played on 3 August 2019, in match of the 18 round against Riteriai, which was lost by result 0:1.

=== Later career ===
At the end of January 2020, Kiriļins moved to German club SV 90 Altengottern. He only played one official game for the club, before the COVID-19 pandemic erupted. In October 2020, he then returned to Latvia where he signed with FK Dinamo Rīga in the Latvian First League.
