= Sergejs Kožans =

Latvian footballer

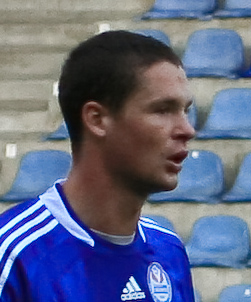
- Kožans playing for Skonto Rīga

Personal information
- Date of birth: 16 February 1986 (age 40)
- Place of birth: Riga, Latvian SSR, Soviet Union (now Republic of Latvia)
- Height: 1.92 m (6 ft 4 in)
- Position: Defender

Youth career
- JFC Skonto

Senior career*
Years	Team	Apps	(Gls)
2005–2009	Skonto Rīga	51	(5)
2009–2012	Lechia Gdańsk	42	(1)
2012	Shakhtyor Soligorsk	0	(0)
2013	Slavia Mozyr	5	(0)
2013–2014	Skonto Rīga	15	(2)
2014	GKS Tychy	11	(0)
2015	Šiauliai	7	(0)
2015	Bytovia Bytów	4	(0)
2016	Spartaks Jūrmala	7	(0)
2016	Riga	2	(0)

International career
2003–2004	Latvia U17	3	(0)
2006–2008	Latvia U21	4	(0)

Managerial career
- 2020–2021: Auda
- 2022–2023: Auda (assistant)
- 2023: Riga (assistant)
- 2024: CSKA Sofia (assistant)
- * Club domestic league appearances and goals

Sergejs Kožans (born 16 February 1986) is a Latvian professional football manager and former player who played as a defender. He was most recently the assistant manager of Riga.

== Club career ==
As a youth player Kožans played for JFC Skonto, making his professional debut in 2005. He spent 4 years playing for Skonto Riga in the Latvian Higher League, all in all making 51 appearances and scoring 5 goals. In 2009, alongside his team-mate Ivans Lukjanovs, Kožans joined the Polish Ekstraklasa side Lechia Gdańsk. In his first season with Lechia Kožans played 18 matches and scored 1 goal. All in all he spent three seasons in the Ekstraklasa, playing 42 matches and scoring 1 goal. On 24 May 2012 it was announced that Kožans would leave the club. He became an unrestricted free agent, and on 13 October 2012 joined the Belarusian Premier League club Shakhtyor Soligorsk, signing a contract until the end of the season. They finished the 2012 Belarusian Premier League season as the runners-up. In March 2013 Kožans joined the fellow league club Slavia Mozyr. He played 5 league matches for the club, but then left because of personal reasons. In August 2013 Kožans returned to his former club Skonto Rīga in the Latvian Higher League. In August 2014 he left the club because of its financial difficulties and unpaid wages, having played 15 league matches and scored 2 goals. On 7 August 2014 it was announced that Kožans would join the Polish second tier club GKS Tychy.

== International career ==
From 2003 to 2004, Kožans played for Latvia U17 and from 2006 to 2008 he was a member of Latvia U21 squad. However, he has not been capped for the senior side.

== Coaching career ==
In January 2023, Kožans returned to Riga as a first-team coach.

== Honours ==
Spartaks Jūrmala

- Latvian Higher League: 2016
