= Andriy Khomyn (footballer, born 1982) =

Ukrainian footballer

Personal information
- Full name: Andriy Mykhaylovych Khomyn
- Date of birth: 2 January 1982 (age 44)
- Place of birth: Kyiv, USSR, Soviet Union
- Height: 1.80 m (5 ft 11 in)
- Position: Defender

Senior career*
Years	Team	Apps	(Gls)
1999	Dynamo-3 Kyiv	14	(0)
2000–2002	Ros' Bila Tserkva	43	(1)
2003–2005	Borysfen Boryspil	52	(3)
2003	→ Borysfen-2 Boryspil	14	(1)
2004	→ Borex-Borysfen Borodyanka	2	(1)
2005–2007	Metalist Kharkiv	30	(0)
2007–2014	Arsenal Kyiv	127	(4)
2014–2015	Hoverla Uzhhorod	22	(0)
2017	Babīte	6	(0)
- * Club domestic league appearances and goals as of 19 August 2017

Andriy Mykhaylovych Khomyn (Ukrainian: Андрій Михайлович Хомин, Russian: Андрей Михайлович Хомин; born 2 January 1982) is a Ukrainian retired footballer.
