= Mindaugas Grigaravičius =

Lithuanian footballer (born 1992)

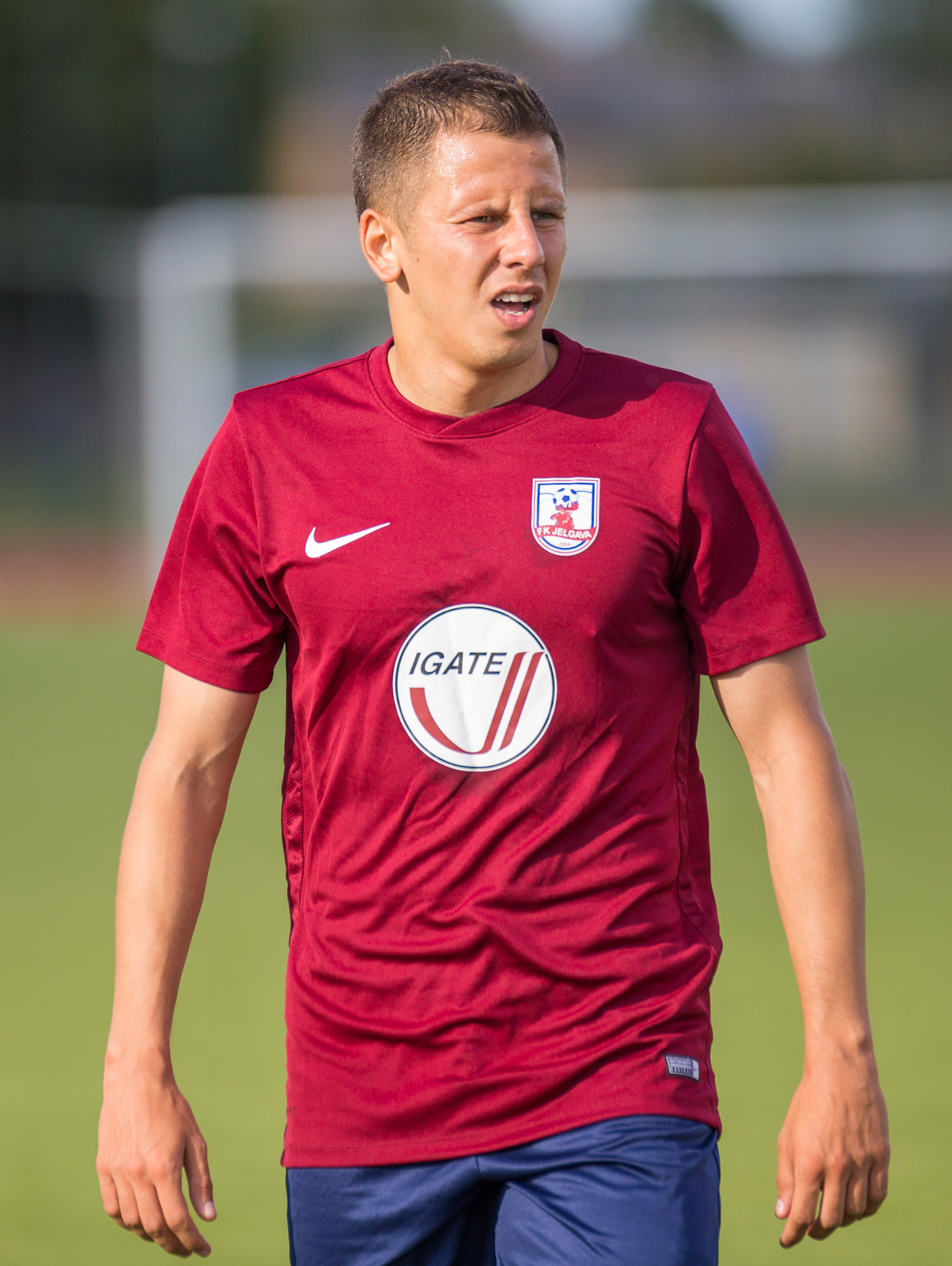
- Grigaravičius playing for Jelgava in 2017

Personal information
- Date of birth: 15 July 1992 (age 34)
- Place of birth: Klaipėda, Lithuania
- Height: 1.72 m (5 ft 8 in)
- Position: Wide midfielder

Senior career*
Years	Team	Apps	(Gls)
2010–2012	FC Klaipėda	47	(1)
2012–2013	FK Jelgava	54	(2)
2014	FK Sūduva Marijampolė	28	(7)
2015	FK Utenis Utena	13	(1)
2015	FC Stumbras	15	(1)
2016	FS METTA/Latvijas Universitāte	11	(0)
2016–2017	FK Jelgava	28	(4)
2017–2018	FK Jonava	15	(2)
2018	FK Jelgava	27	(2)
2019–2023	FK Riteriai	132	(27)
2024	FK Panevėžys	3	(0)

International career^{‡}
2010	Lithuania U19	3	(0)
2012–2014	Lithuania U21	5	(0)
2016–	Lithuania	5	(0)
- * Club domestic league appearances and goals as of 23 April 2024 ‡ National team caps and goals as of 6 June 2017

Mindaugas Grigaravičius (born 15 July 1992) is a Lithuanian professional footballer who plays as a winger.

In January 2023 became a member of FC Kaisar.

== International career ==
Mindaugas Grigariavičius first call-up to the senior Lithuania squad came in August 2016 for the World Cup qualifiers against Slovenia. He made his national team debut coming as substitute on 70th minute against Slovenia in the World Cup qualifier on 4 September 2016.
