= Vyacheslav Sushkin =

Russian footballer

Personal information
- Full name: Vyacheslav Vladimirovich Sushkin
- Date of birth: 11 March 1991 (age 35)
- Place of birth: Leningrad, Soviet Union
- Height: 1.80 m (5 ft 11 in)
- Position: Forward

Youth career
- 2008–2011: Zenit Saint Petersburg

Senior career*
Years	Team	Apps	(Gls)
2009–2011	Zenit Saint Petersburg	0	(0)
2012–2014	Dynamo Saint Petersburg	55	(9)
2014–2015	Fakel Voronezh	20	(4)
2015	Jelgava	11	(3)
2016	Vitebsk	11	(0)
2016	Sioni Bolnisi	7	(1)
2017	Babīte	10	(0)
2017	Niki Volos		
2018	Neftchi Fergana	2	(0)
2020	Neftchi Fergana	0	(0)
- * Club domestic league appearances and goals

Vyacheslav Vladimirovich Sushkin (Russian: Вячеслав Владимирович Сушкин; born 11 March 1991) is a Russian former football forward.

== Career ==
He made his debut in the Russian Second Division for FC Petrotrest Saint Petersburg on 22 April 2012 in a game against FC Sheksna Cherepovets.
