= Artjoms Osipovs =

Russian-Latvian footballer

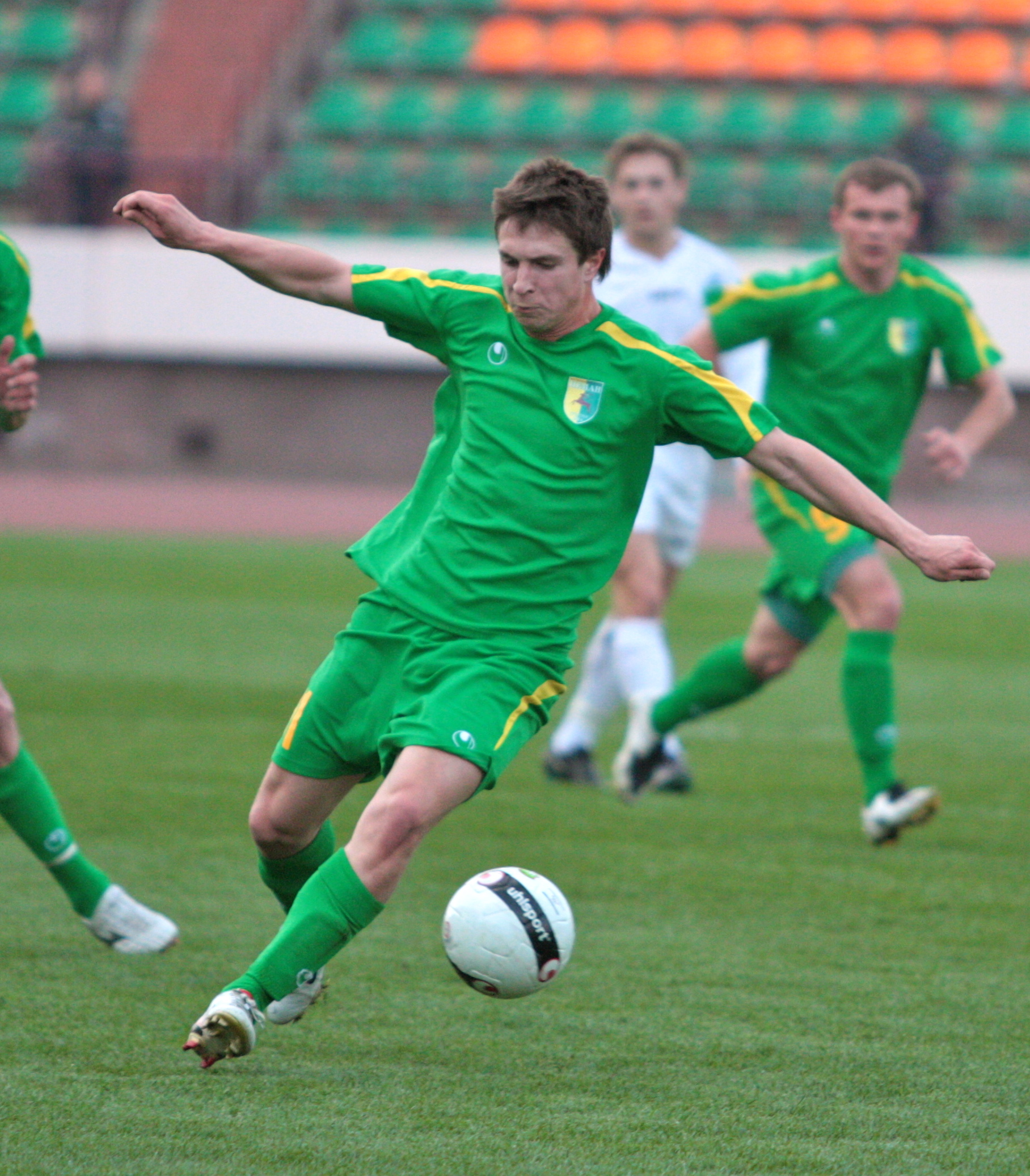
- Osipovs playing for Neman Grodno

Personal information
- Full name: Artjoms Osipovs
- Date of birth: 8 January 1989 (age 37)
- Place of birth: Riga, Latvian SSR, USSR (now Republic of Latvia)
- Height: 1.78 m (5 ft 10 in)
- Position: Defender

Senior career*
Years	Team	Apps	(Gls)
2008	Ventspils	0	(0)
2008–2010	Blāzma Rēzekne	33	(13)
2009	→ Neman Grodno (loan)	5	(0)
2009	→ Tiraspol (loan)	8	(1)
2011	JFK Olimps/RFS	23	(2)
2012–2013	Jūrmala	33	(7)
2013–2015	Skonto Riga	52	(8)
2016	METTA/Latvijas Universitāte	7	(0)
2016	Jelgava	12	(1)
2017	Liepāja	7	(0)
2017–2018	Jonava	30	(0)
2019	Jelgava	18	(1)
2020	Super Nova	5	(1)

International career
2009–2011	Latvia U21	5	(1)
- * Club domestic league appearances and goals as of 31 December 2020

Artjoms Osipovs (born 8 January 1989) is a Russian-Latvian former professional footballer.

Previously he played for FK Ventspils, FK Blāzma Rēzekne, FC Tiraspol, FC Neman Grodno, JFK Olimps/RFS, FC Jūrmala and Skonto Riga.

== Club career ==
=== FK Jelgava ===
Osipovs returned to FK Jelgava for the second time on 1 February 2019.

== Personal life ==
He was a non-citizen of Latvia, but at the end of 2014 he gained citizenship of Russia.
