= SK Babīte =

Latvian football club

SK Babīte/Dinamo
- Full name: Sporta klubs "Babīte"
- Founded: 2015
- Ground: Skonto Stadium, Rīga, Latvia; Piņķi Stadium, Piņķi, Mārupe Municipality, Latvia
- Capacity: 19,500; 1,000
- Manager: Mihails Miholaps
- League: Virslīga
- 2016: Latvian First League, 1st (promoted)
- Website: https://www.facebook.com/BABITEFC/

SK Babīte is a Latvian football club. They are based in the Latvian town of Babīte near Rīga and competed in the highest division of Latvian football (the Virslīga) and the Latvian Football Cup. Their home stadium is located in Piņķi, but due to incompatibility with Virslīga standards the team plays its home matches in Rīga's Skonto Stadium. On 22 June 2017, they were excluded from the Latvian Higher League from 2017 as the Latvian Football Federation received a notice from UEFA's Betting Fraud Detection System for 6 separate games involving Babite.

The previous results of Babīte in the 2017 Higher League (including points, goals scored and conceded) were annulled.

== Players ==
=== First-team squad ===
As of 1 September 2016. Note: Flags indicate national team as defined under FIFA eligibility rules; some limited exceptions apply. Players may hold more than one non-FIFA nationality.

No.	Pos.	Nation	Player
1	GK	LAT	Vjačeslavs Kudrjavcevs
2	DF	LAT	Elvis Studāns
3	DF	LAT	Vladislavs Kuzmins
4	MF	LAT	Viktors Baikovs
7	MF	LAT	Deniss Tarasovs
8	DF	LAT	Dmitrijs Daņilovs
9	MF	RUS	Vyacheslav Sushkin
10	MF	LAT	Viktors Kurma
11	FW	LAT	Niks Savaļnieks
12	GK	LAT	Antons Remezs
14	MF	LAT	Aleksejs Saveljevs
15	FW	LAT	Verners Apiņš
16	GK	LAT	Jaroslavs Morozs
17	DF	LAT	Ņikita Žarovs
18	MF	LAT	Vladas Rimkus

No.	Pos.	Nation	Player
20	FW	LAT	Aleksejs Davidenkovs
21	MF	LAT	Edgars Kārkliņš
22	MF	LAT	Oto Šeļegovičs
24	FW	LAT	Ingmārs Briškens
25	DF	LAT	Antons Dresmanis
26	MF	LAT	Vladimirs Mukins
27	MF	LAT	Ronalds Smans
29	MF	UKR	Ilya Mikhailovsky
32	MF	UKR	Andriy Khomyn
33	DF	LAT	Tigrans Bagdasarjans
47	DF	RUS	Pavel Mochalin
70	FW	LAT	Aleksejs Rosoha
76	MF	RUS	Dmitri Khokhlov
77	MF	LAT	Maksims Vasiljevs
91	MF	LAT	Vadims Avdejevs
