= RTU FC =

Latvian football club

- Full name: RTU Futbola Centrs
- Ground: RTU stadions, Riga, Latvia
- Chairman: Juris Keišs
- Manager: Rustam Zabirov
- League: Latvian First League
- 2018: 6th

RTU FC or RTU Futbola centrs is a Latvian football club, affiliated with the Riga Technical University. They are based in the capital city of Riga and compete in the second highest division of Latvian football (the Latvian First League) and the Latvian Football Cup. From 2017 to 2018 the team partnered with the remnants of the now defunct Skonto FC, playing as RTU FC/Skonto Academy, after Skonto failed to receive the First League licence from LFF in 2016.

The club did not apply for the 2019 Latvian First League season, possibly due to financial issues.

== Players ==
=== First-team squad ===
As of 12 June 2016. Note: Flags indicate national team as defined under FIFA eligibility rules; some limited exceptions apply. Players may hold more than one non-FIFA nationality.

| No. | Pos. | Nation | Player |
|---|---|---|---|
| 2 | DF | LAT | Davids Bagdasarjans |
| 3 | DF | LAT | Viktors Jurkovs |
| 5 | MF | LAT | Krišs Andersons |
| 7 | DF | LAT | Marks Udovičenko |
| 8 | MF | LAT | Marks Petunovs |
| 11 | FW | LAT | Ņikita Jankovskis |
| 12 | MF | LAT | Iļja Savčenko |
| 13 | MF | LAT | Igors Kovaļkovs |
| 14 | DF | LAT | Krišs Andersons |
| 15 | MF | LAT | Pēteris Pavlovskis |

| No. | Pos. | Nation | Player |
|---|---|---|---|
| 18 | FW | LAT | Jegors Morozs |
| 19 | DF | LAT | Sergejs Golubevs |
| 20 | FW | LAT | Valters Kubilovičs |
| 20 | MF | USA | Philip Anthony Atbashyan |
| 22 | DF | LAT | Vadims Borovikovs |
| 23 | DF | LAT | Marks Smuļko |
| 27 | DF | LAT | Aleksejs Počkajevs |
| 29 | MF | LAT | Romens Cvetanovičs |
| 32 | GK | LAT | Kristaps Dzelme |
| 35 | DF | LAT | Raivis Ķiršs |
| 98 | GK | LAT | Deniss Pērkons |
