= Football Championship of the Latvian SSR =

Top tier of soccer in Soviet Latvia

Championship of the Latvian SSR
- Founded: 1945
- Folded: 1991
- Country: Latvian SSR (Soviet Union)
- Last champions: Forums Skonto (1st title) (1991)
- Most championships: 8 – FK ASK (Army Sports Club)

Championship of the Latvian SSR in football (also Higher Football League of the Latvian SSR, Latvian: Latvijas PSR futbola Augstākā līga) was a top competition of association football in the Latvian SSR in 1945-91 soon after the occupation of Latvia by the Soviet Union.

The competition was originally established in 1941 in place of the Virslīga, but was never finished due to invasion of the Soviet Union by Nazi Germany.

== List of champions ==
- 1941: Tournament cancelled due to WWII
- 1942-1944: Tournament interrupted due to WWII
- 1945: FK Dinamo Rīga
- 1946: Daugava Liepāja
- 1947: Daugava Liepāja
- 1948: Žmiļova komanda (Soviet Army Team of Zhmilyov)
- 1949: Sarkanais Metalurgs Liepāja
- 1950: AVN Rīga
- 1951: Sarkanais Metalurgs Liepāja
- 1952: AVN Rīga
- 1953: Sarkanais Metalurgs Liepāja
- 1954: Sarkanais Metalurgs Liepāja
- 1955: Darba Rezerves Rīga
- 1956: Sarkanais Metalurgs Liepāja
- 1957: Sarkanais Metalurgs Liepāja
- 1958: Sarkanais Metalurgs Liepāja
- 1959: RER Rīga
- 1960: ASK Rīga
- 1961: ASK Rīga
- 1962: ASK Rīga
- 1963: ASK Rīga
- 1964: ASK Rīga
- 1965: ASK Rīga
- 1966: ESR Rīga
- 1967: ESR Rīga
- 1968: Starts Brocēni
- 1969: FK Venta Ventspils
- 1970: VEF Rīga
- 1971: VEF Rīga
- 1972: FK Jūrnieks
- 1973: VEF Rīga
- 1974: VEF Rīga
- 1975: VEF Rīga
- 1976: Enerģija Rīga
- 1977: Enerģija Rīga
- 1978: Ķīmiķis Daugavpils
- 1979: Elektrons Rīga
- 1980: Ķīmiķis Daugavpils
- 1981: Elektrons Rīga
- 1982: Elektrons Rīga
- 1983: VEF Rīga
- 1984: Torpedo Rīga
- 1985: FK Alfa
- 1986: Torpedo Rīga
- 1987: Torpedo Rīga
- 1988: RAF Jelgava
- 1989: RAF Jelgava
- 1990: Gauja Valmiera
- 1991: Forums-Skonto

=== Number of titles ===
- 9 – Daugava Liepāja
- 8 – ASK Rīga (AVN)
- 6 – VEF Rīga
- 4 – Enerģija Rīga (ESR)
- 3 – Elektrons Rīga, Torpedo Rīga
- 2 – Ķīmiķis Daugavpils, RAF Jelgava
- 1 – FK Dinamo Rīga, Žmiļova komanda, Darba Rezerves Rīga, RER Rīga, Starts Brocēni, Venta Ventspils, FK Jūrnieks, FK Alfa, Gauja Valmiera, Forums-Skonto

== See also ==
- Latvian Higher League
