= SK Blāzma =

Latvian football club

SK "Blāzma"
- Full name: Sporta klubs "Blāzma" (Sport Club Blāzma): SK Dižvanagi (2002–06); FK Rēzekne (1997-01); PSK Vairogs (1992–96); Strautmala Rezekne (1991); Latgale Rezekne (1990); Torpedo Rezekne (1989); Mašīnbūvētājs Rezekne (1965–88); Rezekne (1956–64); Dynamo Rezekne (1950–55)
- Founded: 2004
- Ground: Sporta Aģentūras Stadions, Rēzekne
- Capacity: 978
- Chairman: Vasīlijs Rožkovs
- Manager: Eriks Grigjans
- League: LMT Virslīga
- 2010: 7th
Home colours	Away colours

SK Blāzma is a Latvian football club in Rēzekne. The club is a continuation of the city's main football club, Dižvanagi. The club competed in Virslīga in the 2008 season following promotion from the 1. Liga in 2007.

== History ==
The first club from Rēzekne to compete in the Latvian football championship in 1950 was Dynamo who finished in 14th place out of 17 clubs. The following season the championship was reorganized and Dynamo club lost its place in the league. Dynamo again played in the Latvian Football Championship in 1952 but finished 9th out of 11 clubs and were relegated once again. In 1956, the club played in the championship, this time though under the name Rezekne. They finished in 8th place out of 14 clubs. Rēzekne were relegated again in the 1958 season. They were promoted again in 1960, but stayed only one season, finishing 10th.

In 1965, the club returned to the Latvian Championship, this time under the name, Mašīnbūvētājs. However, they finished the season on just two points and were relegated. From 1976 to 1978 Mašīnbūvētājs again played in the Latvian top flight, finishing in last place in 1978 and being relegated again. In 1981 and 1985 Mašīnbūvētājs again played in the top flight but each time were relegated after just one season. They were promoted again though and in 1987 and 1988 managed to avoid relegation. In 1989, with a new name, Torpedo, they finished in 8th place out of 17 clubs. In 1990 under the name Latgale they finished in 3rd place, the best finish for the club in its history. However, they did not compete in the 1991 championship.

From 1992 until 1996 under the name Vairogs the club played in the Virslīga finishing 5th in 1994 and reaching the Latvian Cup semi-finals in the same year. In 1997, the club's name was changed again, this time to FK Rēzekne but the results got worse and the club were relegated from the Virslīga in 1999. FK Rēzekne spent several years in the 1. Liga barely holding its place in the second highest division of Latvian football. The situation started to improve in 2002 and FK Rēzekne became RSK Dižvanagi and results started to improve with the league position in the 1. Liga also started to improve. Edgars Gauračs played for the Latvian national U-17 team. In 2004, the club finished 3rd in the 1. Liga, missing out on promotion to FK Zibens and FK Venta. In 2005 however they were promoted to the Virslīga as 1. Liga champions, beating FC Ditton by a single point.

In 2006 Dižvanagi Rēzekne debuted in the Virslīga. The results, however, were poor and they finished the season with just two points. There were positive signs and results though, the stands in the Rēzekne stadium were rebuilt, the club held champions FK Liepājas Metalurgs to a 0–0 draw at home and they beat FK Jūrmala 3–1 in the Latvian Cup, and reached the semi-final of the cup. Edgars Gauračs though left for Italy with Serie A side Ascoli Calcio 1898.

In 2007 under the name SK Blāzma the club played in the 1. līga, finishing second, just one point behind the champions FK Vindava Ventspils and were promoted to the Virslīga for the 2008 season. Dižvanagi Rēzekne are now the reserve team of SK Blāzma under the name Dižvanagi-2 and they compete in the Latgales zona of the 2.līga.

== League and Cup history ==
=== Latvian SSR ===
Dynamo

Season	Division (Name)	Pos./Teams	Pl.	W	D	L	GS	GA	P	Latvian Football Cup
1950	1st (Latvian SSR Higher League)	14/(17)	32	9	3	20	14	62	21	
1952	1st (Latvian SSR Higher League)	9/(11)	20	5	2	13	17	48	12	

Rezekne

Season	Division (Name)	Pos./Teams	Pl.	W	D	L	GS	GA	P	Latvian Football Cup
1956	1st (Latvian SSR Higher League)	8/(14)	16	11	4	11	29	38	26	
1958	1st (Latvian SSR Higher League)	10/(10)	18	0	2	16	-	-	2	
1960	1st (Latvian SSR Higher League)	10/(12)	22	6	5	11	28	19	17	

Mašīnbūvētājs

Season	Division (Name)	Pos./Teams	Pl.	W	D	L	GS	GA	P	Latvian Football Cup
1965	1st (Latvian SSR Higher League)	14/(14)	26	1	0	25	22	78	2	
1976	1st (Latvian SSR Higher League)	12/(13)	24	4	1	19	16	53	9	
1977	1st (Latvian SSR Higher League)	9/(13)	24	7	2	15	20	43	16	
1978	1st (Latvian SSR Higher League)	14/(14)	26	6	6	14	30	39	18	
1981	1st (Latvian SSR Higher League)	15/(16)	30	4	4	22	19	83	12	
1985	1st (Latvian SSR Higher League)	14/(15)	28	6	4	18	28	67	16	
1986	1st (Latvian SSR Higher League)	13/(14)	26	4	6	16	25	58	14	
1988	1st (Latvian SSR Higher League)	14/(16)	30	8	4	18	37	64	20	

Torpedo

Season	Division (Name)	Pos./Teams	Pl.	W	D	L	GS	GA	P	Latvian Football Cup
1989	1st (Latvian SSR Higher League)	8/(16)	30	12	6	13	46	64	30	

Latgale

Season	Division (Name)	Pos./Teams	Pl.	W	D	L	GS	GA	P	Latvian Football Cup
1990	1st (Latvian SSR Higher League)	3/(14)	26	16	3	7	62	39	35	

Straumala

Season	Division (Name)	Pos./Teams	Pl.	W	D	L	GS	GA	P	Latvian Football Cup
1991	1st (Latvian SSR Higher League)	10/(20)	18	2	2	16	12	40	6	

=== Latvia ===
Vairogs

Season	Division (Name)	Pos./Teams	Pl.	W	D	L	GS	GA	P	Latvian Football Cup
1992	1st (Virsliga)	9/(12)	22	7	2	13	29	43	16	
1993	1st (Virsliga)	9/(10)	18	3	3	12	12	36	9	
1994	1st (Virsliga)	5/(12)	22	9	6	7	28	27	24	1/2 finals
1995	1st (Virsliga)	2/(10)	28	7	7	14	35	52	28	1/4 finals
1996	1st (Virsliga)	5/(10)	30	9	5	16	37	54	33	Did not participate

FK Rēzekne

Season	Division (Name)	Pos./Teams	Pl.	W	D	L	GS	GA	P	Latvian Football Cup
1997	1st (Virsliga)	9/(9)	16	1	5	18	10	69	8	1/4 finals
1998	1st (Virsliga)	7/(8)	14	2	5	21	22	80	11	1/8 finals
1999	1st (Virsliga)	8/(8)	28	1	2	25	12	90	5	1/4 finals
2000	2nd (1.liga)	6/(8)	28	6	9	13	32	37	27	1/8 finals
2001	2nd (1.liga)	8/(8)	28	5	3	20	32	111	18	1/8 finals

SK Dižvanagi

Season	Division (Name)	Pos./Teams	Pl.	W	D	L	GS	GA	P	Latvian Football Cup
2002	2nd (1.liga)	7/(8)	28	6	3	19	50	95	21	1/8 finals
2003	2nd (1.liga)	5/(10)	27	14	3	10	58	60	45	1/32 finals
2004	2nd (1.liga)	6/(14)	26	13	3	10	60	57	42	1/8 finals
2005	2nd (1.liga)	3/(14)	26	15	3	8	68	43	48	1/8 finals
2006	1st (Virsliga)	8/(8)	28	0	2	26	11	77	2	1/2 finals

SK Blāzma

Season	Division (Name)	Pos./Teams	Pl.	W	D	L	GS	GA	P	Latvian Football Cup
2007	2nd (1.liga)	2/(16)	30	25	4	1	101	11	79	1/8 finals
2008	1st (Virsliga)	9/(10)	30	5	8	17	20	43	23	1/4 finals
2009	1st (Virsliga)	6/(9)	32	7	5	20	30	71	26	1/4 finals

== Current squad ==
Note: Flags indicate national team as defined under FIFA eligibility rules; some limited exceptions apply. Players may hold more than one non-FIFA nationality.

No.	Pos.	Nation	Player
2	DF	(Latvia) LVA	Roland Lubgans
4	DF	(Russia) RUS	Vitali Zaytsev
5	MF	(Latvia) LVA	Ervīns Krainis (captain)
6	DF	(Latvia) LVA	Valdis Kalva
7	MF	(Latvia) LVA	Jevgenijs Adamenoks
8	MF	(Latvia) LVA	Ilja Antonovs
10	FW	(Latvia) LVA	Dmitrijs Suvorovs
11	MF	(Latvia) LVA	Deniss Kuzmickis
12	GK	(Latvia) LVA	Aigars Seļeckis

No.	Pos.	Nation	Player
14	DF	(Latvia) LVA	Edgars Kleins
17	MF	(Latvia) LVA	Māris Rancāns
19	FW	(Latvia) LVA	Aleksejs Klapins
21	MF	(Latvia) LVA	Dmitrijs Silovs
22	MF	(Latvia) LVA	Jevgēņijs Adamenoks
24	DF	(Latvia) LVA	Ritvars Linužs
28	MF	(Japan) JPN	Go Nagaoka
29	MF	(Latvia) LVA	Edgars Vjalkins
31	GK	(Latvia) LVA	Vitalijs Voronovs

For recent squad changes see: List of Latvian football transfers winter 2010-2011.

== Managers ==
Figures correct as of 30 September 2009.

- (Latvia) Žanis Ārmanis (January 2005 – August 2006)
- (Russia) Nikolai Yuzhanin (August 2006 – December 2007)
- (Latvia) Jurijs Popkovs (December 2007 – August 2008)
- (Latvia) Žanis Ārmanis (August 2008 – July 2010)
- (Latvia) Eriks Grigjans (July 2010–)
