= 1970 Latvian SSR Higher League =

Latvian football league season for the highest division

Latvian SSR Higher League
- Season: 1970

Statistics of Latvian Higher League in the 1970 season.

== Overview ==
It was contested by 14 teams, and VEF won the championship.

== League standings ==
Pos	Team	Pld	W	D	L	GF	GA	GD	Pts
1	VEF	26	14	10	2	46	15	+31	38
2	Venta	26	13	8	5	32	20	+12	34
3	Pilots	26	13	7	6	40	27	+13	33
4	Energija	26	13	6	7	48	38	+10	32
5	Jurnieks	26	11	9	6	30	22	+8	31
6	ASK	26	12	6	8	27	30	−3	30
7	Lielupe	26	10	9	7	33	28	+5	29
8	Starts	26	9	10	7	34	31	+3	28
9	Elektrons	26	8	9	9	31	27	+4	25
10	Ausma	26	6	8	12	23	28	−5	20
11	Atlantija	26	5	8	13	16	32	−16	18
12	Radiotehnikis	26	5	7	14	16	33	−17	17
13	Celtnieks	26	3	9	14	18	44	−26	15
14	RPI	26	3	8	15	20	39	−19	14

Source: rsssf.com
