= 1987 Latvian SSR Higher League =

Latvian football league season for the highest division

Latvian SSR Higher League
- Season: 1987

Statistics of Latvian Higher League in the 1987 season.

== Overview ==
It was contested by 14 teams, and Torpedo won the championship.

== League standings ==
Pos	Team	Pld	W	D	L	GF	GA	GD	Pts
1	Torpedo	26	15	9	2	43	15	+28	39
2	Celtnieks Daugavpils	26	16	5	5	44	21	+23	37
3	Gaismas Tehnika	26	14	8	4	51	18	+33	36
4	VEF	26	11	10	5	33	21	+12	32
5	Celtnieks Rīga	26	12	7	7	48	24	+24	31
6	Junioru izlase	26	12	6	8	34	20	+14	30
7	Gauja	26	11	8	7	36	23	+13	30
8	Jurnieks	26	9	7	10	28	36	−8	25
9	Alfa	26	8	8	10	28	36	−8	24
10	Sarkanais Kvadrats	26	8	7	11	30	28	+2	23
11	Sarkanais Metalurgs	26	6	9	11	29	40	−11	21
12	Aditajs	26	7	2	17	28	71	−43	16
13	Masinbuvetajs	26	4	6	16	25	58	−33	14
14	9 Maijs	26	1	4	21	14	60	−46	6

Source: rsssf.com
