= 1984 Latvian SSR Higher League =

Latvian football league season for the highest division

Latvian SSR Higher League
- Season: 1984

Statistics of Latvian Higher League in the 1984 season.

== Overview ==
It was contested by 12 teams, and Torpedo won the championship.

== League standings ==
Pos	Team	Pld	W	D	L	GF	GA	GD	Pts
1	Torpedo	22	16	3	3	41	14	+27	35
2	Celtnieks Rīga	22	15	4	3	57	21	+36	34
3	VEF	22	14	4	4	51	22	+29	32
4	Alfa	22	11	7	4	34	27	+7	29
5	Gauja	22	11	3	8	38	33	+5	25
6	Jurnieks	22	9	6	7	31	34	−3	24
7	Kimikis	22	8	5	9	28	30	−2	21
8	Energija	22	7	5	10	28	28	0	19
9	Sarkanais Kvadrats	22	7	0	15	30	40	−10	14
10	Aditajs	22	6	4	12	25	36	−11	13 (Note: 3 points deducted?)
11	RPI	22	2	4	16	21	54	−33	8
12	Daugava-RVR	22	3	1	18	15	60	−45	7

Source: rsssf.com
