= 1985 Latvian SSR Higher League =

Latvian football league season for the highest division

Latvian SSR Higher League
- Season: 1985

Statistics of Latvian Higher League in the 1985 season.

== Overview ==
It was contested by 15 teams, and Alfa won the championship.

== League standings ==
Pos	Team	Pld	W	D	L	GF	GA	GD	Pts
1	Alfa	28	17	6	5	50	23	+27	40
2	Kimikis	28	18	3	7	36	20	+16	39
3	Gauja	28	15	8	5	60	32	+28	38
4	Energija	28	15	8	5	48	27	+21	38
5	Sarkanais Metalurgs	28	14	7	7	45	31	+14	35
6	Celtnieks Rīga	28	13	8	7	50	30	+20	34
7	Torpedo	28	11	9	8	39	28	+11	31
8	Junioru izlase	28	13	3	12	40	38	+2	29
9	Jurnieks	28	11	6	11	51	46	+5	28
10	VEF	28	11	5	12	45	34	+11	27
11	Aditajs	28	9	6	13	32	45	−13	24
12	Zvezda	28	7	5	16	28	45	−17	19
13	Sarkanais Kvadrats	28	5	8	15	20	59	−39	18
14	Masinbuvetajs	28	6	4	18	28	67	−39	16
15	RPI	28	1	2	25	19	66	−47	4

Source: rsssf.com
