= 1980 Latvian SSR Higher League =

Latvian football league season for the highest division

Latvian SSR Higher League
- Season: 1980

Statistics of Latvian Higher League in the 1980 season.

== Overview ==
It was contested by 16 teams, and Kimikis won the championship.

== League standings ==
Pos	Team	Pld	W	D	L	GF	GA	GD	Pts
1	Kimikis	30	21	7	2	67	20	+47	49
2	Progress	30	21	4	5	77	28	+49	46
3	Elektrons	30	16	11	3	45	20	+25	43
4	VEF	30	15	9	6	50	24	+26	39
5	Celtnieks	30	14	6	10	54	29	+25	34
6	Energija	30	11	11	8	38	35	+3	33
7	Automobilists	30	9	11	10	40	38	+2	29
8	Jurnieks	30	9	10	11	38	37	+1	28
9	Torpedo	30	8	11	11	28	35	−7	27
10	Sarkanais Metalurgs	30	9	9	12	35	48	−13	26 (Note: 1 point deducted.)
11	RPI	30	11	3	16	29	38	−9	25
12	Gauja	30	9	7	14	35	60	−25	25
13	Radiotehnikis	30	7	10	13	34	48	−14	24
14	Venta	30	8	7	15	33	50	−17	23
15	PFR	30	5	8	17	24	51	−27	18
16	Starts	30	3	4	23	19	85	−66	10

Source: rsssf.com
