= 1979 Latvian SSR Higher League =

Latvian football league season for the highest division

Latvian SSR Higher League
- Season: 1979

Statistics of Latvian Higher League in the 1979 season.

== Overview ==
It was contested by 14 teams, and Elektrons won the championship.

== League standings ==
Pos	Team	Pld	W	D	L	GF	GA	GD	Pts
1	Elektrons	26	22	3	1	63	14	+49	47
2	Energija	26	15	7	4	48	17	+31	37
3	Kimikis	26	15	6	5	36	21	+15	36
4	Torpedo	26	13	7	6	32	15	+17	33
5	Sarkanais Metalurgs	26	10	10	6	38	28	+10	30
6	Jurnieks	26	11	7	8	24	27	−3	29
7	Progress	26	11	6	9	51	41	+10	28
8	Metalists	26	8	8	10	30	31	−1	24
9	VEF	26	8	6	12	33	35	−2	22
10	Radiotehnikis	26	6	9	11	22	27	−5	21
11	Celtnieks	26	4	10	12	27	48	−21	18
12	Starts	26	4	6	16	18	46	−28	14
13	RPI	26	4	6	16	18	47	−29	14
14	Gauja	26	4	3	19	22	65	−43	11

Source: rsssf.com
