= 1969 Latvian SSR Higher League =

Latvian football league season for the highest division

Latvian SSR Higher League
- Season: 1969

Statistics of Latvian Higher League in the 1969 season.

== Overview ==
It was contested by 14 teams, and Venta won the championship.

== League standings ==
Pos	Team	Pld	W	D	L	GF	GA	GD	Pts
1	Venta	26	20	3	3	45	16	+29	43
2	Energija	26	17	6	3	55	28	+27	40
3	Elektrons	26	12	9	5	45	20	+25	33
4	ASK	26	13	6	7	43	23	+20	32
5	Starts	26	13	5	8	42	27	+15	31
6	Pilots	26	12	5	9	29	35	−6	29
7	Lielupe	26	10	6	10	30	26	+4	26
8	Radiotehnikis	26	10	6	10	28	25	+3	26
9	Jurnieks	26	8	7	11	22	24	−2	23
10	RPI	26	9	5	12	26	37	−11	23
11	Baltika	26	8	3	15	20	38	−18	19
12	Lokomotive	26	4	7	15	26	52	−26	15
13	Ausma	26	6	2	18	13	41	−28	14
14	Kurzeme	26	3	4	19	15	47	−32	10

Source: rsssf.com
