= 1981 Latvian SSR Higher League =

Latvian football league season for the highest division

Latvian SSR Higher League
- Season: 1981

Statistics of Latvian Higher League in the 1981 season.

== Overview ==
It was contested by 16 teams, and Elektrons won the championship.

== League standings ==
Pos	Team	Pld	W	D	L	GF	GA	GD	Pts
1	Elektrons	30	21	8	1	83	18	+65	50
2	Celtnieks	30	19	9	2	73	18	+55	47
3	Ķīmiķis	30	20	5	5	71	21	+50	45
4	VEF	30	17	11	2	65	24	+41	45
5	Enerģija	30	14	12	4	69	28	+41	40
6	Torpedo	30	11	12	7	42	24	+18	34
7	Automobilists	30	13	7	10	43	43	0	33
8	Gauja	30	12	8	10	44	46	−2	32
9	FK Jūrnieks	30	12	5	13	45	37	+8	29
10	Progress	30	9	7	14	41	38	+3	25
11	Radiotehniķis	30	7	10	13	42	67	−25	24
12	RPI	30	8	5	17	39	61	−22	21
13	Sarkanais Metalurgs	30	7	5	18	26	55	−29	19
14	Dīzelists	30	4	5	21	31	93	−62	13
15	Mašīnbūvētājs	30	4	4	22	19	83	−64	12
16	Vulkāns	30	5	1	24	33	110	−77	11

Source: rsssf.com
