= 1978 Latvian SSR Higher League =

Latvian football league season for the highest division

Latvian SSR Higher League
- Season: 1978

Statistics of Latvian Higher League in the 1978 season.

== Overview ==
It was contested by 14 teams, and Kimikis won the championship.

== League standings ==
Pos	Team	Pld	W	D	L	GF	GA	GD	Pts
1	Kimikis	26	20	5	1	53	15	+38	45
2	Elektrons	26	16	7	3	41	15	+26	39
3	VEF	26	17	4	5	43	23	+20	38
4	Energija	26	13	7	6	48	30	+18	33
5	RER	26	14	4	8	52	30	+22	32
6	Jurnieks	26	14	3	9	45	30	+15	31
7	Sarkanais Metalurgs	26	10	9	7	30	25	+5	28 (Note: 1 point deducted)
8	Celtnieks	26	7	9	10	37	45	−8	23
9	Starts	26	5	10	11	23	38	−15	19
10	Metalists	26	6	6	14	30	39	−9	18
11	Radiotehnikis	26	4	9	13	20	31	−11	17
12	RPI	26	5	6	15	29	49	−20	16
13	Venta	26	5	5	16	24	54	−30	14
14	Masinbuvetajs	26	1	6	19	15	66	−51	7

Source: rsssf.com
