= 1977 Latvian SSR Higher League =

Latvian football league season for the highest division

Latvian SSR Higher League
- Season: 1977

Statistics of Latvian Higher League in the 1977 season.

== Overview ==
It was contested by 13 teams, and Energija won the championship.

== League standings ==
Pos	Team	Pld	W	D	L	GF	GA	GD	Pts
1	Energija	24	19	5	0	54	13	+41	43
2	Elektrons	24	12	11	1	35	11	+24	35
3	Kimikis	24	15	4	5	51	21	+30	34
4	VEF	24	14	5	5	68	31	+37	33
5	RER	24	13	5	6	53	21	+32	31
6	Jurnieks	24	13	4	7	45	20	+25	30
7	Metalists	24	9	5	10	42	33	+9	23
8	Venta	24	6	6	12	29	36	−7	17 (Note: 1 point deducted.)
9	Masinbuvetajs	24	7	2	15	20	43	−23	16
10	RPI	24	5	5	14	24	31	−7	15
11	Starts	24	6	3	15	30	45	−15	15
12	Sarkanais Metalurgs	24	5	5	14	25	46	−21	15
13	Lielupe	24	2	0	22	10	135	−125	3

Source: rsssf.com
