= 1986 Latvian SSR Higher League =

Latvian football league season for the highest division

Latvian SSR Higher League
- Season: 1986

Statistics of Latvian Higher League in the 1986 season.

== Overview ==
It was contested by 14 teams, and Torpedo won the championship.

== League standings ==
Pos	Team	Pld	W	D	L	GF	GA	GD	Pts
1	Torpedo	26	17	8	1	39	10	+29	42
2	Celtnieks Rīga	26	17	5	4	70	25	+45	39
3	VEF	26	15	6	5	52	22	+30	36
4	Jurnieks	26	14	8	4	41	21	+20	36
5	Kimikis	26	13	5	8	46	20	+26	31
6	Sarkanais Metalurgs	26	11	6	9	50	27	+23	28
7	Junioru izlase	26	9	8	9	50	37	+13	26
8	Energija	26	8	8	10	36	29	+7	24
9	Alfa	26	7	9	10	20	27	−7	23
10	Gauja	26	7	6	13	25	51	−26	20
11	Sarkanais Kvadrats	26	7	5	14	27	51	−24	19
12	Aditajs	26	6	5	15	25	54	−29	17
13	9 Maijs	26	5	3	18	20	65	−45	13
14	Ostinieks	26	4	2	20	25	87	−62	10

Source: rsssf.com
