= 1975 Latvian SSR Higher League =

Latvian football league season for the highest division

Latvian SSR Higher League
- Season: 1975

Statistics of Latvian Higher League in the 1975 season.

== Overview ==
It was contested by 12 teams, and VEF won the championship.

== League standings ==
Pos	Team	Pld	W	D	L	GF	GA	GD	Pts
1	VEF	22	14	6	2	40	12	+28	34
2	Lielupe	22	11	7	4	34	20	+14	29
3	Kimikis	22	11	7	4	39	22	+17	29
4	Elektrons	22	11	7	4	38	24	+14	29
5	Energija	22	10	4	8	30	21	+9	24
6	Starts	22	10	4	8	43	47	−4	24
7	Jurnieks	22	8	6	8	35	34	+1	22
8	RPI	22	8	4	10	31	38	−7	20
9	Radiotehnikis	22	4	10	8	19	24	−5	18
10	RER	22	6	4	12	23	25	−2	16
11	Venta	22	2	7	13	15	41	−26	11
12	Straume	22	3	2	17	12	51	−39	8

Source: rsssf.com
