= 1972 Latvian SSR Higher League =

Latvian football league season for the highest division

Latvian SSR Higher League
- Season: 1972

Statistics of Latvian Higher League in the 1972 season.

== Overview ==
It was contested by 13 teams, and Jurnieks won the championship.

== League standings ==
Pos	Team	Pld	W	D	L	GF	GA	GD	Pts
1	Jurnieks	24	16	5	3	34	11	+23	37
2	VEF	24	14	6	4	57	18	+39	34
3	Energija	24	13	7	4	31	10	+21	33
4	Lielupe	24	13	6	5	41	24	+17	32
5	Elektrons	24	8	10	6	29	19	+10	26
6	Pilots	24	7	10	7	20	22	−2	24
7	Venta	24	9	6	9	31	37	−6	24
8	Ogres TK	24	5	10	9	17	23	−6	20
9	Sarkanais Metalurgs	24	8	3	13	28	39	−11	19
10	Radiotehnikis	24	6	7	11	22	34	−12	19
11	Starts	24	5	8	11	27	35	−8	18
12	Daugava Daugavpils	24	6	5	13	19	32	−13	17
13	Ausma	24	3	3	18	14	66	−52	9

Source: rsssf.com
