= 1982 Latvian SSR Higher League =

Latvian football league season for the highest division

Latvian SSR Higher League
- Season: 1982

Statistics of Latvian Higher League in the 1982 season.

== Overview ==
It was contested by 16 teams, and Elektrons won the championship.

== League standings ==
Pos	Team	Pld	W	D	L	GF	GA	GD	Pts
1	Elektrons	22	16	6	0	34	5	+29	38
2	VEF	22	16	3	3	58	14	+44	35
3	Celtnieks	22	14	6	2	45	14	+31	34
4	Energija	22	12	4	6	36	19	+17	28
5	Gauja	22	10	6	6	42	26	+16	26
6	Kimikis	22	9	3	10	36	29	+7	21
7	Jurnieks	22	8	5	9	32	33	−1	21
8	Ostinieks	22	6	4	12	30	48	−18	16
9	Torpedo	22	8	9	5	28	22	+6	25
10	RPI	22	10	1	11	31	40	−9	21
11	Progress	22	7	6	9	48	43	+5	20
12	Automobilists	22	6	6	10	27	39	−12	18
13	Sarkanais Metalurgs	22	6	4	12	27	41	−14	16
14	Venta	22	5	4	13	29	43	−14	14
15	Starts	22	4	3	15	18	54	−36	9 (Note: 2 points deducted?)
16	Radiotehnikis	22	3	2	17	19	70	−51	8

Source: rsssf.com
