= 1974 Latvian SSR Higher League =

Latvian football league season for the highest division

Latvian SSR Higher League
- Season: 1974

This article gives statistics of the Latvian Higher League in association football in the 1974 season.

== Overview ==
It was contested by 12 teams, and VEF won the championship.

== League standings ==
Pos	Team	Pld	W	D	L	GF	GA	GD	Pts
1	VEF	22	15	7	0	59	15	+44	37 (Note: Champion decided by playoff)
2	Elektrons	22	17	3	2	51	20	+31	37
3	Energija	22	12	8	2	37	20	+17	32
4	Lielupe	22	9	9	4	35	21	+14	27
5	Starts	22	7	8	7	43	43	0	22
6	RPI	22	7	7	8	27	34	−7	21
7	RER	22	7	5	10	30	36	−6	19
8	Venta	22	6	7	9	28	37	−9	19
9	Radiotehnikis	22	2	13	7	25	38	−13	17
10	Kimikis	22	5	6	11	27	50	−23	16
11	Jurnieks	22	5	4	13	32	43	−11	14
12	Daugava Liepaja	22	1	1	20	15	52	−37	3

Source: rsssf.com

=== Playoff ===
- VEF 9-1 Elektrons
