= 1973 Latvian SSR Higher League =

Sport event edition

Latvian SSR Higher League
- Season: 1973

Statistics of Latvian Higher League in the 1973 season.

== Overview ==
It was contested by 12 teams, and VEF won the championship.

== League standings ==
Pos	Team	Pld	W	D	L	GF	GA	GD	Pts
1	VEF	22	15	3	4	46	13	+33	33
2	Starts	22	15	2	5	47	21	+26	32
3	Energija	22	14	2	6	45	16	+29	30
4	Elektrons	22	14	2	6	48	20	+28	30
5	Lielupe	22	11	4	7	36	21	+15	26
6	Jurnieks	22	10	6	6	28	25	+3	26
7	RPI	22	6	1	15	29	37	−8	13
8	Pilots	22	6	0	16	23	32	−9	12
9	Radiotehnikis	22	3	5	14	18	36	−18	11
10	Venta	22	4	3	15	22	50	−28	11
11	Baltija	22	2	2	18	10	47	−37	6
12	Ogres TK	22	0	2	20	11	45	−34	2

Source: rsssf.com
