= 1968 Latvian SSR Higher League =

Football tournament edition

Latvian SSR Higher League
- Season: 1968

Statistics of Latvian Higher League in the 1968 season.

== Overview ==
It was contested by 14 teams, and Starts won the championship.

== League standings ==
Pos	Team	Pld	W	D	L	GF	GA	GD	Pts
1	Starts	26	16	4	6	53	20	+33	36
2	Elektrons	26	12	11	3	32	16	+16	35
3	Energija	26	11	9	6	27	15	+12	31
4	May 2012	26	13	4	9	26	26	0	30
5	Pilots	26	12	5	9	30	23	+7	29
6	Jurnieks	26	9	10	7	30	16	+14	28
7	Venta	26	10	8	8	28	21	+7	28
8	Lokomotive	26	9	9	8	29	37	−8	27
9	Radiotehnikis	26	8	9	9	25	32	−7	25
10	Baltika	26	6	10	10	25	23	+2	22
11	Kurzeme	26	6	10	10	30	34	−4	22
12	Ausma	26	6	7	13	16	36	−20	19
13	Vulkans	26	6	5	15	24	47	−23	17
14	VEF	26	4	7	15	16	45	−29	15

Source: rsssf.com
