= 1983 Latvian SSR Higher League =

Latvian football league season for the highest division

Latvian SSR Higher League
- Season: 1983

Statistics of Latvian Higher League in the 1983 season.

== Overview ==
It was contested by 13 teams, and VEF won the championship.

== League standings ==
Pos	Team	Pld	W	D	L	GF	GA	GD	Pts
1	VEF	26	17	7	2	94	25	+69	41
2	Celtnieks	26	17	5	4	72	29	+43	39
3	Progress	26	15	6	5	53	20	+33	36
4	Kimikis	26	14	7	5	71	27	+44	35
5	Torpedo	26	13	8	5	43	23	+20	34
6	Energija	26	11	10	5	40	29	+11	32
7	Elektrons	26	11	9	6	52	32	+20	31
8	Jurnieks	26	10	8	8	42	34	+8	28
9	Gauja	26	7	8	11	40	52	−12	22
10	Sarkanais Kvadrats	26	8	6	12	32	51	−19	22
11	Automobilists	26	7	3	16	22	65	−43	17
12	Ostinieks	26	6	2	18	22	47	−25	14
13	Sarkanais Metalurgs	26	6	1	19	29	77	−48	13

Source: rsssf.com
