= 1971 Latvian SSR Higher League =

Latvian football league season for the highest division

Latvian SSR Higher League
- Season: 1971

Statistics of Latvian Higher League in the 1971 season.

== Overview ==
It was contested by 13 teams, and VEF won the championship.

== League standings ==
Pos	Team	Pld	W	D	L	GF	GA	GD	Pts
1	VEF	24	14	4	6	40	23	+17	32
2	Jurnieks	24	11	9	4	35	14	+21	31
3	Pilots	24	12	6	6	23	14	+9	30
4	Venta	24	10	9	5	31	22	+9	29
5	Radiotehnikis	24	8	10	6	31	26	+5	26
6	Elektrons	24	10	6	8	23	21	+2	26
7	Energija	24	8	9	7	32	28	+4	25
8	Atlantija	24	7	10	7	26	23	+3	24
9	Starts	24	7	10	7	34	32	+2	24
10	Daugava Daugavpils	24	7	7	10	26	31	−5	21
11	Ausma	24	5	10	9	10	25	−15	20
12	RPI	24	4	11	9	18	29	−11	19
13	Jaunatnes izlase	24	0	5	19	21	62	−41	5

Source: rsssf.com
