= 1967 Latvian SSR Higher League =

Latvian football league season for the highest division

Latvian SSR Higher League
- Season: 1967

Statistics of Latvian Higher League in the 1967 season.

== Overview ==
It was contested by 14 teams, and ESR won the championship.

== League standings ==
Pos	Team	Pld	W	D	L	GF	GA	GD	Pts
1	ASK	26	15	5	6	51	20	+31	35 (Note: Champion was decided by playoff)
2	ESR	26	13	9	4	35	11	+24	35
3	KRR	26	12	10	4	39	22	+17	34
4	RRR	26	11	8	7	33	22	+11	30
5	RABR	26	11	7	8	35	27	+8	29
6	Pilots	26	10	8	8	41	25	+16	28
7	Kurzeme	26	12	4	10	34	37	−3	28
8	Daugavpils	26	10	7	9	20	25	−5	27
9	Baltika	26	11	4	11	30	31	−1	26
10	Broceni	26	7	9	10	26	39	−13	23
11	Ventspils	26	7	7	12	23	27	−4	21
12	Vulkans	26	5	8	13	23	43	−20	18
13	Jelgava	26	6	4	16	19	43	−24	16
14	Dinamo Liepaja	26	4	6	16	10	47	−37	14

Source: rsssf.com

=== Playoff ===
- ESR 5-2 ASK
