= RAF Jelgava =

Latvian football club

- Founded: 1988
- Dissolved: 2003
- Ground: Ozolnieki Stadium, Ozolnieki
- Capacity: 500
- League: 1. līga
- 2003: 7th
Home colours

RAF Jelgava was a Latvian football club based in Jelgava. The foundation of the club is considered in 1988 and for the first two years there were two teams of RAF Jelgava which in 1990 merged into one. One of those played in the lower Soviet leagues, the other – in the Latvian league.

== Team history ==
=== Automobīlists Jelgava ===
The RAF bus factory-sponsored club Automobīlists played in the lower Latvian leagues in the early 1970s, but in the mid-1970s were renamed Metālists.

=== Metālists Jelgava ===
The club first appeared in 1977 and in their debut season in the Latvian league finished 7th out of 13 teams. After three less than stellar seasons the club changed owners – it was once again attached to the RAF bus factory and renamed to Automobīlists Jelgava.

=== Automobīlists Jelgava ===
As Automobīlists the Jelgava squad also had it hard – at best it finished seasons in the middle of the table, and between 1983 and 1987 it played in the 1st league. In 1987 Automobīlists lost to Zemgale Ilūkste for a place in Virslīga but as the league was expanded under the name of RAF, Jelgava once again had a club in the top Latvian league.

=== RAF Jelgava ===
In 1988 and 1989 there were two teams of RAF Jelgava which in 1990 merged into one. One of those played in the lower Soviet leagues, the other – in the Latvian league. In 1988 and 1989 under the management of Viktors Ņesterenko the "local" RAF won the Latvian league, in 1988 as a golden double it also won the Latvian Cup. Meanwhile, the "international" RAF weren't doing that well – although they had in its squad several talented young players including Vladimirs Babičevs, Dzintars Sproģis, Igors Troickis and Aleksandrs Stradiņš, its results were very disappointing. In 1989 Ņesterenko took over the unified RAF team in the Soviet league and in the Baltic league. In 1990 and 1991 the team played better, but then the Soviet Union collapsed and RAF joined the Latvian Virslīga.

In the early 1990s RAF was one of the strongest teams in Virslīga, three times finishing second and once third (in 1992 they finished runners up to Skonto Rīga in an additional game after finishing the season on equal points). However, when the bus plant ran into financial difficulties, the team received new sponsorship from the University of Latvia in 1996 and, as a result, changed their name and relocated to Riga, and played in the Latvian University Stadium.

=== RAF Rīga ===
As RAF Rīga the club only played one season, finishing 5th in the Latvian league, however it won the 1996 Latvian Cup. But after the season the club changed its name again – this time to Universitāte Rīga.

=== Universitāte Rīga ===
The only season under the name of Universitāte didn't bring much success to the club – 6th place in the league with the club being disbanded after the season.

=== RAF Jelgava (again) ===
A team under the name RAF Jelgava appeared again in 2001 in the 1. līga. After the 2003 season the club merged with another Jelgava club – FK Viola Jelgava (formed in 1996) forming FK Jelgava.

== League and Cup history ==
=== Soviet Union ===
RAF Jelgava

Season	Division (Name)	Pos./Teams	Pl.	W	D	L	GS	GA	P	Soviet Cup
1988	4th (Soviet Second League B)	18/(18)	34	5	5	24	43	6	15	Did not participate
1989	4th (Soviet Second League B)	18/(22)	42	10	9	23	38	61	29	Did not participate
1990	4th (Soviet Second League B)	4/(17)	35	17	9	6	54	25	43	Did not participate
1991	4th (Soviet Second League B)	3/(22)	42	28	6	8	71	39	62	Did not participate

=== Baltic ===
RAF Jelgava

Season	Division (Name)	Pos./Teams	Pl.	W	D	L	GS	GA	P
1990	1st (Baltic League)	8/(17)	32	13	10	9	44	37	36

=== Latvian SSR ===
Metālists Jelgava

Season	Division (Name)	Pos./Teams	Pl.	W	D	L	GS	GA	P	Latvian Football Cup
1977	1st (Latvian SSR Higher League)	7/(13)	24	9	5	10	42	33	23	
1978	1st (Latvian SSR Higher League)	10/(14)	26	6	6	14	30	39	18	
1979	1st (Latvian SSR Higher League)	11/(14)	26	8	8	10	29	31	24	

Automobīlists Jelgava

Season	Division (Name)	Pos./Teams	Pl.	W	D	L	GS	GA	P	Latvian Football Cup
1980	1st (Latvian SSR Higher League)	7/(16)	30	9	11	10	40	38	29	
1981	1st (Latvian SSR Higher League)	12/(16)	22	6	6	10	27	39	18	
1982	1st (Latvian SSR Higher League)	11/(14)	26	7	3	16	22	65	17	
1983	1st (Latvian SSR Higher League)	11/(14)	26	7	3	16	22	65	22	

RAF Jelgava

Season	Division (Name)	Pos./Teams	Pl.	W	D	L	GS	GA	P	Latvian Football Cup
1988	1st (Latvian SSR Higher League)	1/(16)	30	19	11	0	69	18	49	Winner
1989	1st (Latvian SSR Higher League)	1/(17)	31	22	7	2	72	26	51	

=== Latvia ===
RAF Jelgava

Season	Division (Name)	Pos./Teams	Pl.	W	D	L	GS	GA	P	Latvian Football Cup
1992	1st (Virsliga)	2/(12)	22	17	14	1	43	6	38	
1993	1st (Virsliga)	3/(10)	18	12	2	4	34	11	26	Winner
1994	1st (Virsliga)	2/(12)	22	13	7	2	38	11	33	1/4 finals
1995	1st (Virsliga)	2/(10)	18	14	6	8	40	28	48	1/2 finals

RAF Rīga / FC Universitāte Rīga

Season	Division (Name)	Pos./Teams	Pl.	W	D	L	GS	GA	P	Latvian Football Cup
1996	1st (Virsliga)	5/(10)	28	11	6	11	37	45	39	Winner

FC Universitāte Rīga

Season	Division (Name)	Pos./Teams	Pl.	W	D	L	GS	GA	P	Latvian Football Cup
1997	1st (Virsliga)	6/(9)	24	8	5	11	25	42	29	1/2 finals

RAF Jelgava

Season	Division (Name)	Pos./Teams	Pl.	W	D	L	GS	GA	P	Latvian Football Cup
2001	2nd (1.līga)	4/(8)	28	14	6	8	62	33	48	1/8 finals
2002	2nd (1.līga)	5/(8)	28	12	2	14	48	47	38	1/16 finals
2003	2nd (1.līga)	7/(10)	27	8	4	15	33	62	28	1/16 finals

== European record ==
Season	Competition	Round	Team	Home	Away	Aggregate
1993–94	UEFA Cup Winners' Cup	PR	(Faroe Islands) HB Tórshavn^{1}	1–0	0–3	1–3
1995–96	UEFA Cup	PR	(Wales) Afan Lido F.C.^{1}	0–0	2–1	2–1
1995–96	UEFA Cup	1R	(Moldova) FC Zimbru Chişinău^{1}	1–2	0–1	1–3
1996–97	UEFA Cup Winners' Cup	QR	(Liechtenstein) FC Vaduz^{2}	1–1	1–1(aet)	2–2(p)
1997	UEFA Intertoto Cup	Group 7	(Turkey) İstanbulspor^{2}	1–5	—	5th
1997	UEFA Intertoto Cup	Group 7	(Hungary) Vasas SC^{2}	—	0–3	5th
1997	UEFA Intertoto Cup	Group 7	(Germany) Werder Bremen^{2}	0–3	—	5th
1997	UEFA Intertoto Cup	Group 7	(Sweden) Östers IF^{2}	—	1–2	5th

== Honours ==
=== Latvia ===
- Latvian Higher League
  - Runners-Up (2): 1992, 1994, 1995
- Latvian Cup
  - Winners (2): 1993, 1996

== Latvian SSR ==
- Latvian SSR Higher League
  - Winner: (2) 1988, 1989
- Latvian Cup
  - Winners: (1) 1988

Notes

- Note 1: As RAF Jelgava.
- Note 2: As FC Universitate Riga.
