= 1964 Latvian SSR Higher League =

Latvian higher league stats

Latvian SSR Higher League
- Season: 1964

Statistics of Latvian Higher League in the 1964 season.

== Overview ==
It was contested by 14 teams, and ASK won the championship.

== League standings ==
Pos	Team	Pld	W	D	L	GF	GA	GD	Pts
1	ASK	26	17	4	5	68	26	+42	38
2	Daugavpils	26	14	7	5	46	21	+25	35
3	KRR	26	14	5	7	53	32	+21	33
4	RER	26	13	7	6	39	26	+13	33
5	Tosmares c	26	11	8	7	34	30	+4	30
6	Ventspils	26	9	9	8	35	34	+1	27
7	Broceni	26	9	9	8	38	40	−2	27
8	Kompresors	26	8	10	8	44	34	+10	26
9	PFR	26	8	8	10	30	40	−10	24
10	Dinamo Liepaja	26	7	9	10	23	36	−13	23
11	Vulkans	26	7	7	12	28	41	−13	21
12	Aizpute	26	6	6	14	25	46	−21	18
13	Jūrmala	26	6	5	15	23	45	−22	17
14	Lignums	26	3	6	17	23	58	−35	12

Source: rsssf.com
