= 1966 Latvian SSR Higher League =

Latvian football league season for the highest division

Latvian SSR Higher League
- Season: 1966

Statistics of Latvian Higher League in the 1966 season.

== Overview ==
It was contested by 14 teams, and ESR won the championship.

== League standings ==
Pos	Team	Pld	W	D	L	GF	GA	GD	Pts
1	ESR	26	17	5	4	45	15	+30	39
2	ASK	26	16	5	5	46	26	+20	37
3	Pilots	26	14	6	6	42	19	+23	34
4	KRR	26	11	8	7	33	27	+6	30
5	Jelgava	26	10	9	7	33	22	+11	29
6	Baltika	26	9	11	6	27	20	+7	29
7	Daugavpils	26	11	6	9	37	34	+3	28
8	Dinamo Liepaja	26	10	7	9	27	25	+2	27
9	Ventspils	26	6	9	11	21	25	−4	21
10	Broceni	26	8	4	14	29	36	−7	20
11	RER	26	5	9	12	24	32	−8	19
12	Aizpute	26	6	7	13	16	43	−27	19
13	Vulkans	26	6	4	16	24	46	−22	16
14	PFR	26	5	6	15	23	57	−34	16

Source: rsssf.com
