= 1976 Latvian SSR Higher League =

Latvian football league season for the highest division

Latvian SSR Higher League
- Season: 1976

Statistics of Latvian Higher League in the 1976 season.

== Overview ==
It was contested by 13 teams, and Energija won the championship.

== League standings ==
Pos	Team	Pld	W	D	L	GF	GA	GD	Pts
1	Energija	24	16	5	3	49	19	+30	37
2	Kimikis	24	14	8	2	32	11	+21	36
3	VEF	24	16	3	5	46	17	+29	35
4	RER	24	15	5	4	45	17	+28	35
5	Lielupe	24	10	7	7	30	23	+7	27
6	Jurnieks	24	9	8	7	29	22	+7	26
7	RPI	24	8	8	8	23	33	−10	24
8	Starts	24	8	5	11	36	42	−6	21
9	Elektrons	24	5	10	9	27	33	−6	20
10	Venta	24	4	9	11	17	28	−11	17
11	Radiotehnikis	24	6	5	13	22	41	−19	17
12	Rezekne	24	4	1	19	16	53	−37	9
13	RPR	24	3	2	19	16	49	−33	8

Source: rsssf.com
