= 1944 Latvian Higher League =

Annual soccer tournament

Latvian SSR Higher League
- Season: 1944

Statistics of Latvian Higher League in the 1944 season, which was started during the German occupation of Latvia during World War II.

== Overview ==
The tournament was not completed because of the Red Army offensive into the Baltic States.

== League standings ==
Pos	Team	Pld	W	D	L	GF	GA	GD	Pts
1	ASK	6	5	0	1	27	11	+16	10
2	RFK	6	5	0	1	13	6	+7	10
3	Olimpija	5	4	0	1	15	8	+7	8
4	VEF	6	3	0	3	21	12	+9	6
5	Daugavieši	6	2	2	2	11	14	−3	6
6	Lure Riga	7	1	1	5	12	17	−5	3
7	Auseklis	6	1	1	4	11	18	−7	3
8	Rīgas Vilki	6	1	0	5	8	32	−24	2

Source: rsssf.com
