= Roberts Skadats =

Latvian footballer

Roberts Skadats (born 1948) is a former Latvian football midfielder and forward who played with FK Daugava Rīga for most of his career.

== Playing biography ==
After completing secondary education Skadats was offered to join Daugava - the top football team in Latvia - at the age of 18 years. His first season he spent with Daugava reserves where he was team leader. Skadats was unhappy with his position in Daugava and was close to leaving the team and joining Zvejnieks Liepāja but the team manager persuaded him that he was counting on Skadats as a future main squad player. And that he indeed became - not only he played 77 matches in 1969–1970 for Daugava but also scored 15 goals (in 1969 he proved that he could become a successor to the Daugava star veteran player - Gunārs Ulmanis and Georgijs Smirnovs).

However 1970s were not a great decade both for Daugava (stuck in the third strongest league of Soviet football) and for Skadats. Despite his good technique he never realized his potentially fully because defenders played against him rough and that made Skadats too cautious on the field. He had to leave Daugava at the age of 28 because of a conflict with the general manager. Skadats played for ten more years in the Latvian league for Elektrons but that was a much lower level than that of Daugava. In Elektrons Skadats played together with several other former Daugava footballers - Jānis Dreimanis, Laimonis Laizāns and Ilmārs Liepiņš, winning the Latvian championship and the Latvian Cup several times, in 1979 he was the best goalscorer of the Latvian league.
