= 1991 Latvian SSR Higher League =

Latvian football league season for the highest division

Latvian SSR Higher League
- Season: 1991

Statistics of Latvian Higher League in the 1991 season.

== Overview ==
It was contested by 20 teams, and Forums Skonto won the championship.

== League standings ==
| Pos | Team | Pld | W | D | L | GF | GA | GD | Pts |
|---|---|---|---|---|---|---|---|---|---|
| 1 | Forums Skonto | 18 | 15 | 2 | 1 | 33 | 7 | +26 | 32 |
| 2 | Pārdaugava | 18 | 12 | 2 | 4 | 38 | 13 | +25 | 26 |
| 3 | Olimpija | 18 | 10 | 5 | 3 | 34 | 13 | +21 | 25 |
| 4 | Celtnieks Daugavpils | 18 | 10 | 2 | 6 | 39 | 20 | +19 | 22 |
| 5 | VEF | 18 | 5 | 7 | 6 | 18 | 19 | −1 | 17 |
| 6 | Gauja | 18 | 6 | 4 | 8 | 21 | 33 | −12 | 16 |
| 7 | Vārpa-Dilar | 18 | 5 | 3 | 10 | 14 | 27 | −13 | 13 |
| 8 | Torpedo | 18 | 4 | 5 | 9 | 21 | 26 | −5 | 13 |
| 9 | Starts | 18 | 4 | 2 | 12 | 21 | 52 | −31 | 10 |
| 10 | Strautmala | 18 | 2 | 2 | 14 | 12 | 40 | −28 | 6 |
| 11 | Sarkanais Kvadrāts | 28 | 11 | 5 | 12 | 45 | 52 | −7 | 27 |
| 12 | Rīgas Audums | 28 | 11 | 5 | 12 | 55 | 57 | −2 | 27 |
| 13 | Betons | 28 | 7 | 13 | 8 | 50 | 47 | +3 | 27 |
| 14 | Jūrnieks | 28 | 9 | 6 | 13 | 41 | 58 | −17 | 24 |
| 15 | FK Auda | 28 | 8 | 8 | 12 | 35 | 49 | −14 | 24 |
| 16 | Faless | 28 | 7 | 7 | 14 | 45 | 68 | −23 | 21 |
| 17 | Celtnieks Rīga | 28 | 7 | 6 | 15 | 39 | 64 | −25 | 20 |
| 18 | Apgaismes tehnika | 28 | 5 | 8 | 15 | 33 | 55 | −22 | 18 |
| 19 | Daugava | 28 | 6 | 4 | 18 | 34 | 67 | −33 | 16 |
| 20 | Dīzelists | 28 | 2 | 7 | 19 | 28 | 79 | −51 | 11 |

Source: rsssf.com
