= 1963 Latvian SSR Higher League =

Latvian football league season for the highest division

Latvian SSR Higher League
- Season: 1963

Statistics of Latvian Higher League in the 1963 season.

== Overview ==
It was contested by 14 teams, and ASK won the championship.

== League standings ==
Pos	Team	Pld	W	D	L	GF	GA	GD	Pts
1	ASK	26	19	6	1	72	11	+61	44
2	KBRR	26	18	4	4	54	21	+33	40
3	RER	26	15	7	4	52	18	+34	37
4	LMR	26	13	6	7	47	25	+22	32
5	Lignums	26	12	7	7	48	41	+7	31
6	Tosmares c	26	11	5	10	43	32	+11	27
7	Vulkans	26	11	3	12	40	36	+4	25
8	Broceni	26	9	6	11	43	39	+4	24
9	Daugavpils	26	9	4	13	30	42	−12	22
10	RVR	26	8	5	13	39	48	−9	21
11	ASK-2	26	7	7	12	35	52	−17	21
12	Jūrmala	26	6	4	16	25	60	−35	16
13	Jelgava	26	4	4	18	20	60	−40	12
14	Valmiera	26	4	4	18	20	83	−63	12

Source: rsssf.com
