= 1962 Latvian SSR Higher League =

Latvian football league season for the highest division

Latvian SSR Higher League
- Season: 1962

Statistics of Latvian Higher League in the 1962 season.

== Overview ==
It was contested by 7 teams, and ASK won the championship.

== League standings ==
Pos	Team	Pld	W	D	L	GF	GA	GD	Pts
1	ASK	12	11	0	1	43	7	+36	22
2	Jūrmala	12	6	3	3	21	17	+4	15
3	Pilots	12	4	6	2	22	21	+1	14
4	Broceni	12	5	1	6	18	22	−4	11
5	KBRR	12	3	4	5	20	21	−1	10
6	Vulkans	12	1	4	7	15	28	−13	6
7	Tosmares c	12	2	2	8	15	38	−23	6

Source: rsssf.com
