= 1961 Latvian SSR Higher League =

Latvian football league season for the highest division

Latvian SSR Higher League
- Season: 1961

Statistics of Latvian Higher League in the 1961 season.

== Overview ==
It was contested by 8 teams, and ASK won the championship, winning all of their games.

== League standings ==
Pos	Team	Pld	W	D	L	GF	GA	GD	Pts
1	ASK	7	7	0	0	31	3	+28	14
2	Pilots	7	5	0	2	18	6	+12	10
3	Tosmares c	7	3	2	2	13	9	+4	8
4	Broceni	7	3	0	4	12	12	0	6
5	Ventspils	7	2	2	3	9	15	−6	6
6	RVR	7	2	1	4	12	16	−4	5
7	Daugavpils	7	2	0	5	6	28	−22	4
8	Vulkans	7	1	1	5	8	20	−12	3

Source: rsssf.com
