= 1941 Latvian SSR Higher League =

Latvian football league season for the highest division

Statistics of Latvian Higher League in the 1941 season, which was the first to be held after the Soviet occupation and annexation of Latvia in 1940.

== Overview ==
Started in June 1941 but was immediately interrupted due to the outbreak of the German–Soviet War.

== Participants ==
- FK VEF Rīga
- FK Dinamo Rīga (affiliate of Dynamo Sports Society)
- FK Dinamo-2
- Lokomotīve Rīga (affiliate of Lokomotiv Sports Society)
- KFKU (former Universitātes Sports)
- RGK Rīga
- RDKA (former FK ASK Rīga)
- Spartaks Riga
- Dinamo Liepāja (Liepāja)
