= 1990 Latvian SSR Higher League =

Latvian football league season for the highest division

Latvian SSR Higher League
- Season: 1990

Statistics of Latvian Higher League in the 1990 season.

== Overview ==
It was contested by 14 teams, and Gauja won the championship.

== League standings ==
Pos	Team	Pld	W	D	L	GF	GA	GD	Pts
1	Gauja Valmiera	26	18	5	3	51	20	+31	41
2	VEF	26	16	7	3	59	21	+38	39
3	Latgale	26	16	3	7	62	39	+23	35
4	Apgaismes Tehnika	26	15	3	8	60	31	+29	33
5	Sarkanais Kvadrāts	26	13	6	7	40	30	+10	32
6	Celtnieks Daugavpils	26	11	4	11	48	46	+2	26
7	Jurnieks	26	10	6	10	37	41	−4	26
8	Betons	26	10	5	11	54	49	+5	25
9	Rīgas Audums	26	11	3	12	59	76	−17	25
10	Vārpa Ilūkste	26	8	8	10	41	42	−1	24
11	Tiltubuvetajs	26	7	7	12	48	71	−23	21
12	Dīzelists	26	5	7	14	33	46	−13	17
13	Aditajs	26	6	4	16	30	50	−20	16
14	Dubna	26	1	2	23	26	86	−60	4

Source: rsssf.com

== See also ==
- 1990 Baltic League
