= VEF Rīga =

VEF Rīga may refer to:

- BK VEF Rīga, a Latvian basketball team
- FK VEF Rīga, a defunct Latvian football team
