= 1965 Latvian SSR Higher League =

Latvian football league season for the highest division

Latvian SSR Higher League
- Season: 1965

Statistics of Latvian Higher League in the 1965 season.

== Overview ==
It was contested by 14 teams, and ASK won the championship.

== League standings ==
Pos	Team	Pld	W	D	L	GF	GA	GD	Pts
1	ASK	26	20	6	0	61	15	+46	46
2	Ventspils	26	16	2	8	37	25	+12	34
3	Pilots	26	13	7	6	37	17	+20	33
4	Daugavpils	26	14	5	7	46	26	+20	33
5	KRR	26	14	3	9	48	34	+14	31
6	PFR	26	12	6	8	31	32	−1	30
7	RER	26	10	8	8	43	25	+18	28
8	Baltika	26	12	4	10	34	30	+4	28
9	Kompresors	26	10	5	11	34	39	−5	25
10	Broceni	26	11	1	14	33	49	−16	23
11	Dinamo Liepaja	26	7	7	12	20	32	−12	21
12	Aizpute	26	5	8	13	31	50	−19	18
13	Vulkans	26	3	6	17	22	47	−25	12
14	Rezekne	26	1	0	25	22	78	−56	2

Source: rsssf.com
