= 1959 Latvian SSR Higher League =

Annual soccer tournament

Latvian SSR Higher League
- Season: 1959

Statistics of Latvian Higher League in the 1959 season.

== Overview ==
It was contested by 10 teams, and RER won the championship.

== League standings ==
Pos	Team	Pld	W	D	L	GF	GA	GD	Pts
1	RER	18	13	2	3	40	8	+32	28 (Note: Ranking of the top three teams was decided by playoff tournament)
2	Sarkanais Metalurgs	18	13	2	3	42	18	+24	28
3	ASK	18	13	2	3	49	8	+41	28
4	RVR	18	10	3	5	42	20	+22	23
5	Tosmares c	18	8	3	7	30	29	+1	19
6	Pilots	18	7	1	10	30	44	−14	15
7	Vulkans	18	5	3	10	24	41	−17	13
8	Dinamo Rīga	18	5	1	12	24	38	−14	11
9	VEF	18	5	1	12	22	37	−15	11
10	Lokomotive	18	1	2	15	10	70	−60	4

Source: rsssf.com

=== Playoff tournament ===
Pos	Team	Pld	W	D	L	GF	GA	GD	Pts
1	RER	2	1	1	0	2	1	+1	3 (Note: Champion was decided by championship match)
2	Sarkanais Metalurgs	2	1	1	0	4	2	+2	3
3	ASK	2	0	0	2	1	4	−3	0

Source: rsssf.com

==== Championship match ====
- RER 3-2 Sarkanais Metalurgs
