= Ronalds Žagars =

Latvian footballer (born 1950)

Ronalds Žagars (born 1950) is a former Latvian football goalkeeper who played for Zvejnieks Liepāja and FK Daugava Rīga.

== Playing biography ==
Žagars first played in Liepāja but was offered to join Daugava Rīga in the first Soviet league. in 1969. Over the first two seasons with Daugava he played only 12 matches and had to return to Zvejnieks Liepāja. In 1974, he was invited to Daugava again for the best season of his career – he played almost half of the team's matches (23) and had nearly the same amount of time in goal as his more famous colleague Laimonis Laizāns. But in the next 3 seasons he never played more than 10 matches and had to sit on the bench behind Aleksandrs Kulakovs.

In 1977 at the age of 27 Žagars left Daugava and joined Enerģija Rīga with which he won the Latvian league in 1977.
