= 1956 Latvian SSR Higher League =

Latvian football league season for the highest division

Latvian SSR Higher League
- Season: 1956

Statistics of Latvian Higher League in the 1956 season.

== Overview ==
It was contested by 13 teams, and Sarkanais Metalurgs won the championship.

== League standings ==
Pos	Team	Pld	W	D	L	GF	GA	GD	Pts
1	Sarkanais Metalurgs	26	24	2	0	82	13	+69	50
2	RVR	26	16	6	4	66	21	+45	38
3	RER	26	16	5	5	63	15	+48	37
4	VEF	26	14	3	9	44	31	+13	31
5	ASK	26	13	4	9	46	30	+16	30
6	Vulkans	26	13	4	9	53	50	+3	30
7	Lokomotive	26	12	3	11	65	43	+22	27
8	Rezekne	26	11	3	12	29	38	−9	25
9	Daugavas SP	26	8	3	15	43	44	−1	19
10	Varpa	26	8	2	16	27	87	−60	18
11	Talsi	26	6	3	17	23	56	−33	15
12	Daugavpils	25	6	2	17	17	82	−65	14
13	Dinamo Rīga	27	4	4	19	20	68	−48	12

Source: rsssf.com
