= Anatoli Kondratenko =

Soviet footballer (born 1959)

Anatoli Kondratenko (born 1949) is a former Soviet football striker who played for Daugava Rīga from 1971 to 1976.

He was sent to Latvia in the army. There he played in the Republic league for Pilots Rīga and after his military service was completed he was invited to play for FK Daugava Rīga. His strong sides on the football field were speed and ability to provoke opponents to foul thus often earning penalty kicks.

In his first season in Daugava Kondratenko scored 7 goals in 36 matches (best result in the team) but Daugava finished only 19 in the first league and was relegated to the second league. Soon Kondratenko proved his goalscoring abilities in 1973 by scoring 27 goals (from Daugava total of 64) in 29 matches but Daugava failed to return to the first league. In 1974 Kondratneko scored 22 more goals but Daugava failed to impress in the second league playoffs and again didn't earn promotion. In 1975 when Daugava finally got promoted back to the first league Kondratenko wasn't the main force in the teams attack anymore - he had scored only 8 goals. The 1976 season in which Daugava again dropped from the first league Kondratenko played in only 10 matches and scored one goal.

When Kondratenko wasn't anymore needed in Daugava he returned to the Latvian league where he joined Enerģija Rīga and in 1976 and 1977 won the Latvian league. In 1977 with 23 goals he was the best goalscorer in the Latvian league. In 1979 Kondratenko tried to return to a higher level as he joined Zvejnieks Liepāja which played in the same league as Daugava but after a single season he left Liepāja. In the early 1980s Kondratenko played again in the Latvian league with VEF Rīga.
