= 1943 Latvian Higher League =

Football league season

Latvian Higher League
- Season: 1943
- Champions: ASK
- Matches: 21
- Goals: 90 (4.29 per match)

Statistics of Latvian Higher League (Latvijas futbola Virslīga) in the 1943 season, held during the German occupation of Latvia during World War II.

== Overview ==
It was contested by 7 teams, and ASK won the championship.

== League standings ==
Pos	Team	Pld	W	D	L	GF	GA	GD	Pts
1	ASK	6	5	1	0	19	5	+14	11
2	Olimpija	6	4	2	0	20	11	+9	10
3	RFK	6	3	2	1	13	9	+4	8
4	VEF	6	3	1	2	14	9	+5	7
5	Rīgas Vilki	6	2	0	4	12	15	−3	4
6	Jelgavas SB	6	0	1	5	8	18	−10	1
7	LDzB	6	0	1	5	4	23	−19	1

Source: rsssf.com
