= 1960 Latvian SSR Higher League =

Latvian football league season for the highest division

Latvian SSR Higher League
- Season: 1960

Statistics of Latvian Higher League in the 1960 season.

== Overview ==
It was contested by 12 teams, and ASK won the championship.

== League standings ==
Pos	Team	Pld	W	D	L	GF	GA	GD	Pts
1	ASK	22	19	2	1	88	14	+74	40
2	Pilots	22	13	4	5	44	22	+22	30
3	RVR	22	12	5	5	48	34	+14	29
4	VEF	22	10	7	5	63	43	+20	27
5	Vulkans	22	11	4	7	41	33	+8	26
6	RER	22	9	6	7	41	32	+9	24
7	Celtnieks	22	9	5	8	41	31	+10	23
8	Tosmares c	22	9	2	11	46	41	+5	20
9	Rigas Audums	22	8	2	12	37	59	−22	18
10	Rezekne	22	6	5	11	28	49	−21	17
11	Dinamo Rīga	22	3	3	16	23	73	−50	9
12	Jelgava	22	0	1	21	20	89	−69	1

Source: rsssf.com
