= 1955 Latvian SSR Higher League =

Latvian football league season for the highest division

Latvian SSR Higher League
- Season: 1955

Statistics of Latvian Higher League in the 1955 season.

== Overview ==
It was contested by 10 teams, and Darba Rezerves won the championship.

== League standings ==
Pos	Team	Pld	W	D	L	GF	GA	GD	Pts
1	Darba Rezerves	18	16	0	2	61	16	+45	32
2	VEF	18	12	1	5	40	22	+18	25
3	RER	18	11	2	5	40	12	+28	24
4	ASK	18	10	2	6	30	26	+4	22
5	Sarkanais Metalurgs	18	9	3	6	25	15	+10	21
6	Vulkans	18	8	0	10	36	32	+4	16
7	Varpa	18	4	3	11	29	48	−19	11
8	Dinamo Rīga	18	5	1	12	23	54	−31	11
9	Daugava Talsi	18	4	3	11	24	62	−38	11
10	Ventspils	18	2	3	13	21	42	−21	7

Source: rsssf.com
