= 1957 Latvian SSR Higher League =

Latvian football league season for the highest division

Latvian SSR Higher League
- Season: 1957

Statistics of Latvian Higher League in the 1957 season.

== Overview ==
It was contested by 10 teams, and Sarkanais Metalurgs won the championship.

== League standings ==
Pos	Team	Pld	W	D	L	GF	GA	GD	Pts
1	Sarkanais Metalurgs	18	12	5	1	32	12	+20	29
2	Dinamo Rīga	18	10	4	4	40	18	+22	24
3	RER	18	9	3	6	28	21	+7	21
4	RVR	18	6	6	6	23	21	+2	18
5	Vulkans	18	7	4	7	22	27	−5	18
6	ASK	18	7	3	8	35	30	+5	17
7	VEF	18	6	5	7	30	27	+3	17
8	Lokomotive	18	7	2	9	25	32	−7	16
9	Rezekne	18	5	4	9	18	26	−8	14
10	Valmiera	18	0	6	12	8	47	−39	6

Source: rsssf.com
