= 1949 Latvian SSR Higher League =

Latvian football league season for the highest division

Latvian SSR Higher League
- Season: 1949

Statistics of Latvian Higher League in the 1949 season.

== Overview ==
It was contested by 12 teams, and Sarkanais Metalurgs won the championship.

== League standings ==
Pos	Team	Pld	W	D	L	GF	GA	GD	Pts
1	Sarkanais Metalurgs	22	22	0	0	121	9	+112	44
2	PAK Zhmylov	22	15	2	5	54	26	+28	32
3	PAK Kasatkin	22	14	3	5	58	31	+27	31
4	Spartak	22	13	5	4	53	29	+24	31
5	Dinamo Rīga	22	11	5	6	49	29	+20	27
6	Dinamo Ventspils	22	10	4	8	42	44	−2	24
7	DzSK	22	6	6	10	38	63	−25	18
8	VEF	22	7	3	12	29	49	−20	17
9	Daugava Daugavpils	22	6	4	12	26	42	−16	16
10	RVR	22	6	3	13	31	43	−12	15
11	Daugava Dobele	22	2	5	15	21	84	−63	9
12	AVN	22	0	0	22	17	90	−73	0

Source: rsssf.com
