= 1945 Latvian SSR Higher League =

Latvian football league season for the highest division

Latvian SSR Higher League
- Season: 1945

The 1945 Latvian Higher League was a season of the Latvian Higher League, the top-level football league in Latvia. It was contested by six teams, with Dinamo Rīga winning the championship.

== League standings ==
| Pos | Team | Pld | W | D | L | GF | GA | GD | Pts |
|---|---|---|---|---|---|---|---|---|---|
| 1 | Dinamo Rīga | 5 | 5 | 0 | 0 | 23 | 3 | +20 | 10 |
| 2 | Daugava Liepaja | 5 | 4 | 0 | 1 | 16 | 9 | +7 | 8 |
| 3 | AVN | 5 | 3 | 0 | 2 | 14 | 12 | +2 | 6 |
| 4 | VEF | 5 | 2 | 0 | 3 | 7 | 13 | −6 | 4 |
| 5 | Dinamo-2 | 5 | 1 | 0 | 4 | 7 | 16 | −9 | 2 |
| 6 | PAK Leontyev | 5 | 0 | 0 | 5 | 5 | 19 | −14 | 0 |

Source: rsssf.com
