= 1948 Latvian SSR Higher League =

Annual soccer tournament

Latvian SSR Higher League
- Season: 1948

Statistics of Latvian Higher League in the 1948 season.

== Overview ==
It was contested by 12 teams, and PAK Zhmylov won the championship.

== League standings ==
Pos	Team	Pld	W	D	L	GF	GA	GD	Pts
1	PAK Zhmylov	22	17	0	5	79	29	+50	34
2	PAK Goncharov	22	13	4	5	62	32	+30	30
3	PAK Tsibulis	22	12	6	4	42	24	+18	30
4	AVN	22	12	5	5	50	32	+18	29
5	Spartak	22	13	2	7	54	35	+19	28
6	Daugava Liepaja	22	10	4	8	53	42	+11	24
7	VEF	22	9	4	9	41	38	+3	22
8	Daugava Riga	22	4	7	11	29	51	−22	15
9	Dinamo Ventspils	22	6	2	14	41	63	−22	14
10	Dinamo Rīga	22	5	3	14	35	70	−35	13
11	DzSK	22	5	3	14	24	67	−43	13
12	Daugava Talsi	22	5	2	15	35	62	−27	12

Source: rsssf.com
