= Vulkāns Kuldīga =

Latvian football club

Vulkāns Kuldīga was a Latvian football club from Kuldīga. It was one of the leading clubs in Latvian football in 1950s and 1960s.

== History ==
A football club by the name of Vulkāns ( 'volcano' in Latvian) appeared in Kuldīga in the early 1930s as a football club of the Vulkāns Match Factory. For a couple of years it was the strongest club in Kuldīga but it disappeared in the mid-1930s.

After World War II as the football system in Latvia was reorganized and most of the football clubs of the Latvian Republic were disbanded by the Soviet occupation, Daugava Kuldīga sports club was formed which took most of the towns best footballers. In 1947 in addition to Daugava there appeared also a second Kuldīga squad – again by the name of Vulkāns. In 1949 Daugava and Vulkāns were merged under the name of Vulkāns (Daugava had better footballers but Vulkāns had the financial support required by the club to achieve anything significant). In 1949 Vulkāns earned promotion to the Class A of Latvian football (top league).

The debut year in 1950 was quite successful as Vulkāns finished 5th in the Latvian league. In 1951 Vulkāns achieved its best-ever position in the Latvian league – by finishing third. The leading players of the late 1940s, early 1950s Vulkāns were Leons Tomašs, Jānis Karaškēvics, Hardijs Blūms, Fricis Rubulis, Heinrihs Freimanis, Raimonds Dambis and others.

In the 1960s Vulkāns did not perform well in the league, however in 1964 when the club was managed by its former player Heinrihs Freimanis the club won the Latvian Cup, one of the very few minor Latvian city clubs to ever achieve the feat. In 1968, Vulkāns was relegated from the top league.

The entire 1970s Vulkāns played in regional Latvian leagues and only in 1980 earned promotion to Class A again, but the 1981 season was a disappointment and the club was relegated again. Vulkāns continued to play in lower leagues until the late 1980s when the club completely collapsed.

A new club by the name of FK Vulkāns was founded in Kuldīga in the early 2000s but after a couple of seasons it got renamed to Linde-N and it last played as FK Elvi in the Latvian Second League (in 2008).

Today, Kuldīga has been and is represented in the Second and Third Leagues by teams such as FC Nikers, Kuldīgas NSS and Kuldīgas FS/Goldingen United.
