= 1951 Latvian SSR Higher League =

Latvian football league season for the highest division

Latvian SSR Higher League
- Season: 1951

Statistics of Latvian Higher League in the 1951 season.

== Overview ==
It was contested by 6 teams, and Sarkanais Metalurgs won the championship.

== League standings ==
Pos	Team	Pld	W	D	L	GF	GA	GD	Pts
1	Sarkanais Metalurgs	5	4	1	0	16	2	+14	9
2	AVN	5	4	1	0	8	3	+5	9
3	Vulkans	5	2	0	3	2	8	−6	4
4	VEF	5	2	0	3	8	9	−1	4
5	Daugava Riga	5	1	1	3	3	11	−8	3
6	PAK Chernishov	5	0	1	4	1	5	−4	1

Source: rsssf.com
