= 1924 Latvian Football Championship =

Latvian Football Championship
- Season: 1924
- Matches played: 10
- Goals scored: 25 (2.5 per match)

Statistics of Latvian Higher League in the 1924 season.

== Overview ==
RFK won the championship.

== League standings ==
Pos	Team	Pld	W	D	L	GF	GA	GD	Pts
1	RFK	4	4	0	0	11	1	+10	8
2	ASK	4	2	1	1	4	4	0	5
3	Amatieris	4	2	0	2	6	9	−3	4
4	JKS	4	1	0	3	1	4	−3	2
5	LSB	4	0	1	3	3	7	−4	1

Source: rsssf.com

Kaiserwald withdrew after 2 rounds because of the decision of Latvia Football Union (LFS - Latvijas Futbola Savieniba) which prohibited foreign players to participate in the championship.

2nd stage: RFK [Riga] - Cesu VB [Cesis] 5-1
