= 1946 Latvian SSR Higher League =

Latvian football league season for the highest division

Latvian SSR Higher League
- Season: 1946

Statistics of Latvian Higher League in the 1946 season.

== Overview ==
It was contested by 8 teams, and Daugava won the championship.

== League standings ==
Pos	Team	Pld	W	D	L	GF	GA	GD	Pts
1	Daugava Liepaja	14	11	0	3	60	16	+44	22
2	VEF	14	10	2	2	30	18	+12	22
3	AVN	14	10	1	3	56	16	+40	21
4	Dinamo Rīga	14	8	1	5	40	24	+16	17
5	Daugava Riga	14	7	1	6	34	32	+2	15
6	Spartak	14	4	0	10	22	66	−44	8
7	Lokomotive	14	2	1	11	17	45	−28	5
8	PAK Leontyev	14	1	0	13	14	56	−42	2

Source: rsssf.com
