= 1947 Latvian SSR Higher League =

Annual soccer tournament

Latvian SSR Higher League
- Season: 1947

Statistics of Latvian Higher League in the 1947 season.

== Overview ==
It was contested by 7 teams, and Daugava Liepaja won the championship.

== League standings ==
Pos	Team	Pld	W	D	L	GF	GA	GD	Pts
1	Daugava Liepaja	12	9	3	0	43	12	+31	21
2	VEF	12	6	4	2	21	17	+4	16
3	PAK Goncharov	12	5	4	3	21	17	+4	14
4	Daugava Riga	12	3	5	4	21	33	−12	11
5	Dinamo Rīga	12	4	2	6	28	31	−3	10
6	AVN	12	2	3	7	16	27	−11	7
7	Spartak	12	1	3	8	17	30	−13	5

Source: rsssf.com
