= 1958 Latvian SSR Higher League =

Latvian football league season for the highest division

Latvian SSR Higher League
- Season: 1958

Statistics of Latvian Higher League in the 1958 season.

== Overview ==
It was contested by 10 teams, and Sarkanais Metalurgs won the championship.

== League standings ==
Pos	Team	Pld	W	D	L	GF	GA	GD	Pts
1	Sarkanais Metalurgs	18	11	6	1	35	10	+25	28
2	RVR	18	10	4	4	35	21	+14	24
3	Tosmares c	18	10	4	4	26	23	+3	24
4	Dinamo Rīga	18	9	5	4	30	19	+11	23
5	ASK	18	9	4	5	24	20	+4	22
6	VEF	18	9	2	7	15	19	−4	20
7	RER	18	8	2	8	18	16	+2	18
8	Vulkans	18	6	4	8	22	23	−1	16
9	Lokomotive	18	1	1	16	11	65	−54	3
10	Rezekne	0	–	–	–	–	–	—	0 (Note: Withdrew after 9 rounds)

Source: rsssf.com
