= Latvian Higher League =

Men's association football top division of Latvia

- Founded: 1927; 99 years ago
- Country: Latvia
- Confederation: UEFA (Europe)
- Number of clubs: 10
- Level on pyramid: 1
- Relegation to: Future League
- Domestic cup(s): Latvian Cup; Latvian Supercup
- International cup(s): UEFA Champions League; UEFA Conference League
- Current champions: RFS (4th title) (2026)
- Most championships: Skonto (15)
- Broadcasters: Domestic; TV4; International; Eleven Sports; OneFootball
- Sponsor: TonyBet
- Website: tonybetvirsliga.com
- Current: 2026 Latvian Higher League

Latvian Higher League or Virslīga, also known as TonyBet Virslīga for sponsorship reasons, is a professional association football league in Latvia and the highest level of the Latvian football league system. Organised by the Latvian Football Federation, the league is contested by ten clubs.

== History and league format ==
=== History ===
The first all-national, regular Latvian championship – the Virslīga – which succeeded the Riga Football League and other, parallel regional leagues, was organized in 1927. It succeeded the previous Latvian Championship (Latvian: Latvijas meistarsacīkstes futbolā / Latvijas čempionāts futbolā) that was held from 1922 to 1926 in various formats, usually involving irregular games or knockout tournaments between the best team from Riga and regional champions.

The Virslīga lasted until the Soviet occupation and annexation of Latvia in 1940. A Latvian championship was organized in 1942 and 1943 during the German occupation of Latvia during World War II, with tournaments interrupted by fighting in 1941 and 1944. After World War II, between 1945 and 1991 the championship of the Latvian SSR was the main footballing competition in Soviet-occupied Latvia.

With Latvia restoring full independence in August 1991, the newly re-established Latvian Football Federation (LFF) decided to reorganise its competitions within the Virslīga from 1992. The same year Latvia returned to FIFA and became a member of UEFA.

=== Format ===
Latvian Higher League is usually played from early March till November. Although the team count in the league has changed multiple times (10 in 2007 and 2020, 9 in 2019 and 2021, and 8 in 2015–2018), since 2022, a total of 10 teams participate in the Virslīga. Each side plays 36 games during the season, with 18 games being played at home and the other 18 away.

At the end of each season, the lowest placed team in the league gets automatically relegated to the Optibet Nākotnes Līga, with Nākotnes Līga winner replacing them, while the second lowest placed team gets to play in a 2 leg relegation playoff (Pārspēles) against the runner-up of the Nākotnes Līga, for the last spot in the league. The winner of Virslīga qualifies for the UEFA Champions League first qualification round, while runners-up and 3rd place teams qualify for the UEFA Conference League first qualification round.

A winter off-season league cup, the Virslīga Winter Cup, was played in January of each year from 2013 to 2017, which was replaced in 2018 by the Virslīga Cup (Latvian: Virslīgas kausa izcīņa). However, since 2024, a revamped off-season tournament, Livonia Cup, is being played from January till February, with teams from Latvia's and Estonia's leagues taking part.

== Sponsorships and name changes ==
The League has changed sponsors for several times. From 2006 until 2010 it was known as the LMT Virslīga. No sponsorships were established for the 2011 season. Starting from the 2012 season, the league was reorganised in partnership with an NGO as "Latvijas Futbola virslīga", adopting the NGO's name in the 2012 season. From 2013 to 2015, the league was known as the SMScredit.lv Virslīga due to a contract with the online microfinance company SMScredit. In March 2016, it was announced that the Virslīga would be sponsored by SynotTip Sports Bar on a three-year contract. They were succeeded by betting firm Optibet on a two-year contract, beginning with the Optibet Virslīga 2019 season, which lasted until 2024. In 2024 Optibet was replaced by TonyBet.

== Clubs (2026) ==
Locations of the 2026 Latvian Higher League teams

Club	Position in 2025 Latvian Higher League	First Latvian Higher League season	Number of seasons in Latvian Higher League	First season of current spell	Number of seasons of current spell	Latvian Higher League titles	National titles	Last title	Founded
BFC Daugavpils	4th	2014	11	2019	8	0	0	2018	2009
FK Auda	5th	1986	11	2022	4	0	2	2025	1969
Grobiņas SC	9th	2024	2	2024	2	0	0	2023	2009
FS Jelgava	6th	2023	3	2023	3	0	0	2022	2017
FK Liepāja	3rd	2014	12	2014	12	1	2	2020	2014
Ogre United	1st (F.L.)	2026	1	2026	1	0	0	2025	2022
FK RFS	2nd	2008	11	2016	10	3	3	2024	2005
Riga FC	1st	2016	10	2016	10	4	2	2026	2014
SK Super Nova	8th	2022	4	2025	2	0	0	2024	2000
FK Tukums 2000	7th	2020	6	2022	5	0	0	2019	2000

== Titles by year ==
=== Riga Football League ===
- 1908 British FC
- 1909 RV Union
- 1910 RV Union
- 1911 Britannia FC
- 1912 RV Union
- 1913 Kaiserwald Riga
- 1914 Britannia FC
- 1915 Britannia FC

=== Latvian Championship 1922–1940 (independent) ===
- 1922 Kaiserwald Riga
- 1923 Kaiserwald Riga
- 1924 RFK Riga
- 1925 RFK Riga
- 1926 RFK Riga
- 1927 Olimpija Liepāja
- 1928 Olimpija Liepāja
- 1929 Olimpija Liepāja
- 1930 RFK Riga
- 1931 RFK Riga
- 1932 ASK Riga
- 1933 Olimpija Liepāja
- 1934 RFK Riga
- 1935 RFK Riga
- 1936 Olimpija Liepāja
- 1937 Not played
- 1938 Olimpija Liepāja
- 1939 Olimpija Liepāja
- 1940 RFK Riga

=== Football Championship of Latvian SSR 1942–1991 ===
- 1942 ASK Riga
- 1943 ASK Riga
- 1944 ASK Riga
- 1945 Dinamo Riga
- 1946 Sarkanais Metalurgs Liepāja
- 1947 Sarkanais Metalurgs Liepāja
- 1948 SA Riga
- 1949 Sarkanais Metalurgs Liepāja
- 1950 AVN Riga
- 1951 Sarkanais Metalurgs Liepāja
- 1952 AVN Riga
- 1953 Sarkanais Metalurgs Liepāja
- 1954 Sarkanais Metalurgs Liepāja
- 1955 Darba rezerves (local Trudovye Rezervy section)
- 1956 Sarkanais Metalurgs Liepaja
- 1957 Sarkanais Metalurgs Liepaja
- 1958 Sarkanais Metalurgs Liepaja
- 1959 RER Riga
- 1960 SKA Riga
- 1961 SKA Riga
- 1962 SKA Riga
- 1963 SKA Riga
- 1964 SKA Riga
- 1965 SKA Riga
- 1966 ESR-Enerģija Riga
- 1967 ESR-Enerģija Riga
- 1968 Starts Brocēni
- 1969 Venta Ventspils
- 1970 VEF Riga
- 1971 VEF Riga
- 1972 Jūrnieks Riga
- 1973 VEF Riga
- 1974 VEF Riga
- 1975 VEF Riga
- 1976 Enerģija Riga
- 1977 Enerģija Riga
- 1978 Ķīmiķis Daugavpils
- 1979 Elektrons Riga
- 1980 Ķīmiķis Daugavpils
- 1981 Elektrons Riga
- 1982 Elektrons Riga
- 1983 VEF Riga
- 1984 Torpedo Riga
- 1985 Alfa Riga
- 1986 Torpedo Riga
- 1987 Torpedo Riga
- 1988 RAF Jelgava
- 1989 RAF Jelgava
- 1990 Gauja Valmiera
- 1991 Skonto Riga

=== Since independence in 1991 ===
- 1992 Skonto Riga
- 1993 Skonto Riga
- 1994 Skonto Riga
- 1995 Skonto Riga
- 1996 Skonto Riga
- 1997 Skonto Riga
- 1998 Skonto Riga
- 1999 Skonto Riga
- 2000 Skonto Riga
- 2001 Skonto Riga
- 2002 Skonto Riga
- 2003 Skonto Riga
- 2004 Skonto Riga
- 2005 Liepajas Metalurgs
- 2006 FK Ventspils
- 2007 FK Ventspils
- 2008 FK Ventspils
- 2009 Liepajas Metalurgs
- 2010 Skonto Riga
- 2011 FK Ventspils
- 2012 Daugava Daugavpils
- 2013 FK Ventspils
- 2014 FK Ventspils
- 2015 FK Liepaja
- 2016 JPFS/FK Spartaks Jurmala
- 2017 JPFS/FK Spartaks Jurmala
- 2018 Riga FC
- 2019 Riga FC
- 2020 Riga FC
- 2021 RFS
- 2022 Valmiera
- 2023 RFS
- 2024 RFS
- 2025 Riga FC
- 2026 RFS

== Topscorers (1992–present) ==
Year	Top scorers	Club	Goals
1992	(Latvia) Vjačeslavs Ževnerovičs	FK VEF Rīga	19
1993	(Latvia) Aleksandrs Jeļisejevs	Skonto FC	20
1994	(Latvia) Vladimirs Babičevs	Skonto FC	14
1995	(Latvia) Vitālijs Astafjevs	Skonto FC	19
1996	(Latvia) (Russia) Mihails Miholaps	Daugava Riga	33
1997	(Georgia (country)) David Chaladze	Skonto FC	25
1998	(Latvia) Viktors Dobrecovs	FK Liepājas Metalurgs	23
1999	(Latvia) Viktors Dobrecovs	FK Liepājas Metalurgs	22
2000	(Latvia) Vladimirs Koļesņičenko	Skonto FC	17
2001	(Latvia) (Russia) Mihails Miholaps	Skonto FC	24
2002	(Latvia) (Russia) Mihails Miholaps	Skonto FC	23
2003	(Latvia) Viktors Dobrecovs	FK Liepājas Metalurgs	36
2004	(Russia) Aleksandr Katasonov	FK Liepājas Metalurgs	21
2005	(Latvia) Viktors Dobrecovs (Latvia) Igors Sļesarčuks	FK Liepājas Metalurgs; FK Venta/FK Ventspils	18
2006	(Latvia) (Russia) Mihails Miholaps	Skonto FC	15
2007	(Latvia) Vīts Rimkus	FK Ventspils	20
2008	(Latvia) Vīts Rimkus	FK Ventspils	14
2009	(Latvia) Kristaps Grebis	FK Liepājas Metalurgs	30
2010	(Latvia) Deniss Rakels (Brazil) Nathan Júnior	FK Liepājas Metalurgs; Skonto FC	18
2011	(Brazil) Nathan Júnior	Skonto FC	22
2012	(Georgia (country)) Mamuka Ghonghadze	FC Daugava	18
2013	(Latvia) Artūrs Karašausks (Latvia) Andrejs Kovaļovs	Skonto FC; FC Daugava	16
2014	(Latvia) Vladislavs Gutkovskis	Skonto FC	28
2015	(Latvia) Dāvis Ikaunieks	FK Liepāja	15
2016	(Latvia) Ģirts Karlsons	FK Ventspils	17
2017	(Russia) Yevgeni Kozlov (Latvia) Artūrs Karašausks (Nigeria) Adeleke Akinjemi	FK Spartaks Jūrmala; FK Liepāja; FK Ventspils	10
2018	(Serbia) (Montenegro) Darko Lemajić	Riga FC	15
2019	(Serbia) (Montenegro) Darko Lemajić	Riga FC/RFS	15
2020	(Brazil) Dodô	FK Liepāja	18
2021	(Cameroon) Leonel Wamba	FK Spartaks Jūrmala	14
2022	(Latvia) Raimonds Krollis	Valmiera FC	24
2023	(Latvia) Marko Regža	Riga FC	19
2024	(Brazil) Reginaldo Ramires	FK Auda/Riga FC	25
2025	(Serbia) (Montenegro) Darko Lemajić	FK RFS	29

== Notable managers and players ==
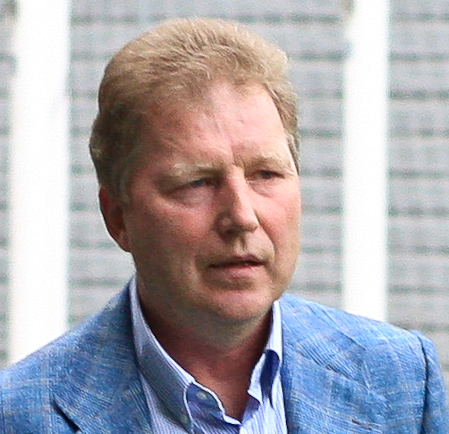
Aleksandrs Starkovs has won 12 league titles since independence with Skonto as a manager.

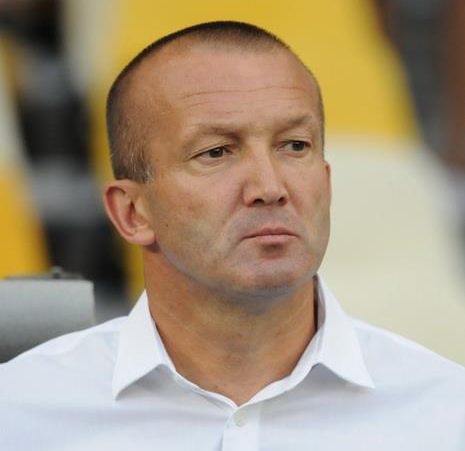
Three times winner with Ventspils Ukrainian Roman Hryhorchuk is the first manager who reached Europa League group stage in Virslīga history.

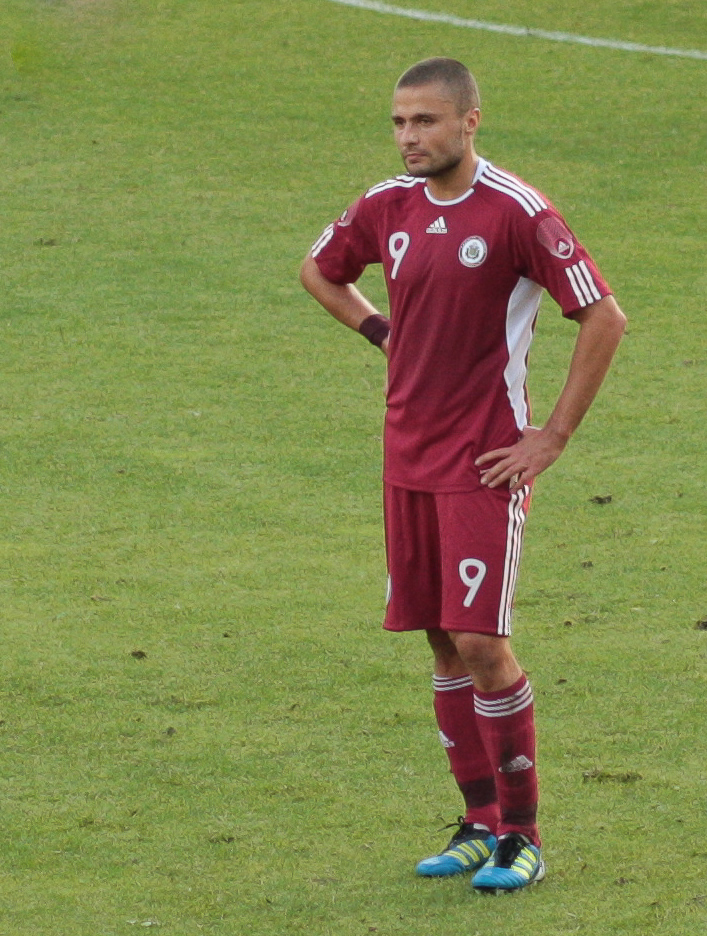
First-ever Latvian who scored in Euros Māris Verpakovskis has won league titles with both Skonto and Liepāja.

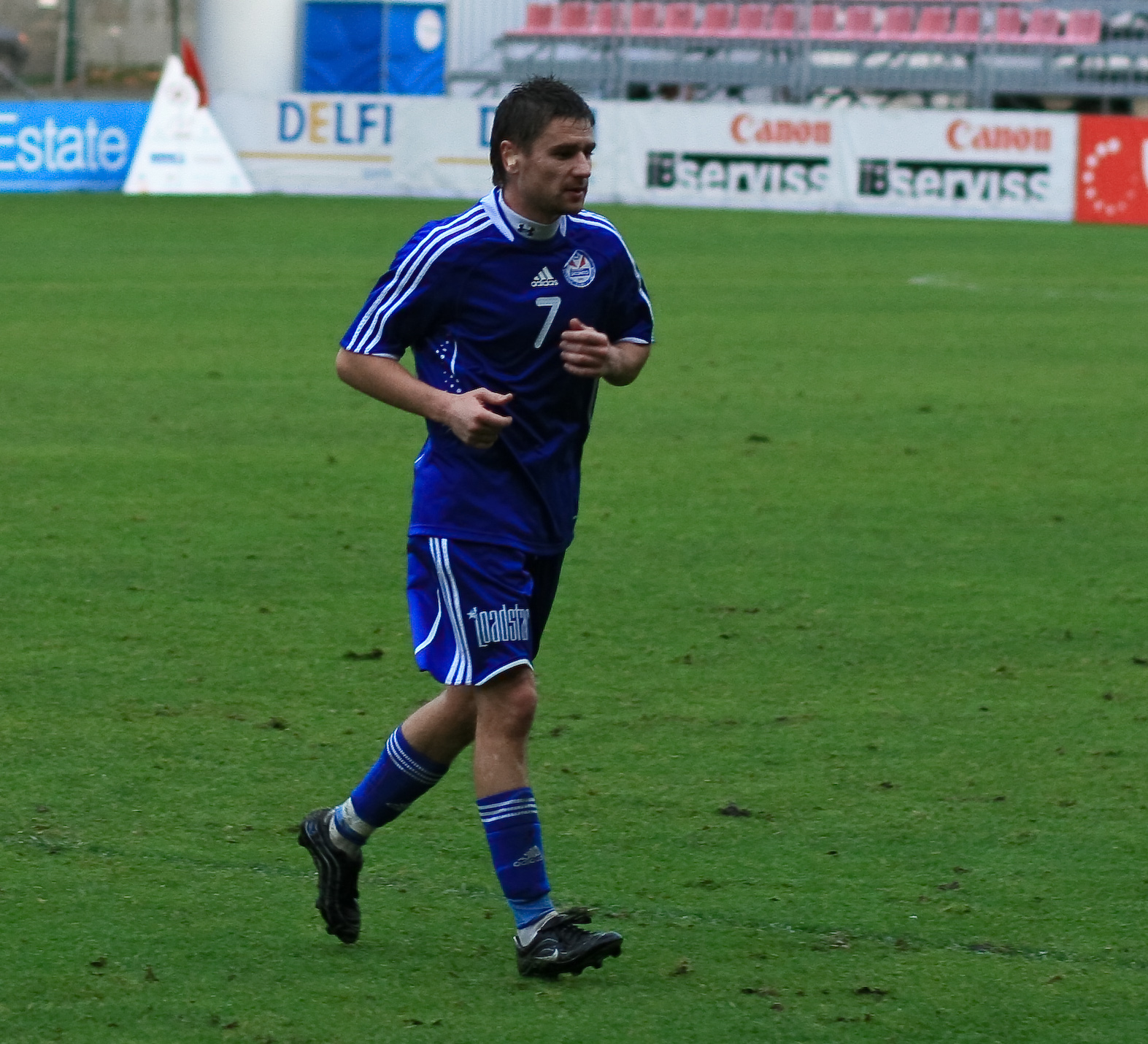
Ukrainian born Marians Pahars has won 5 league titles before moving to Southampton.

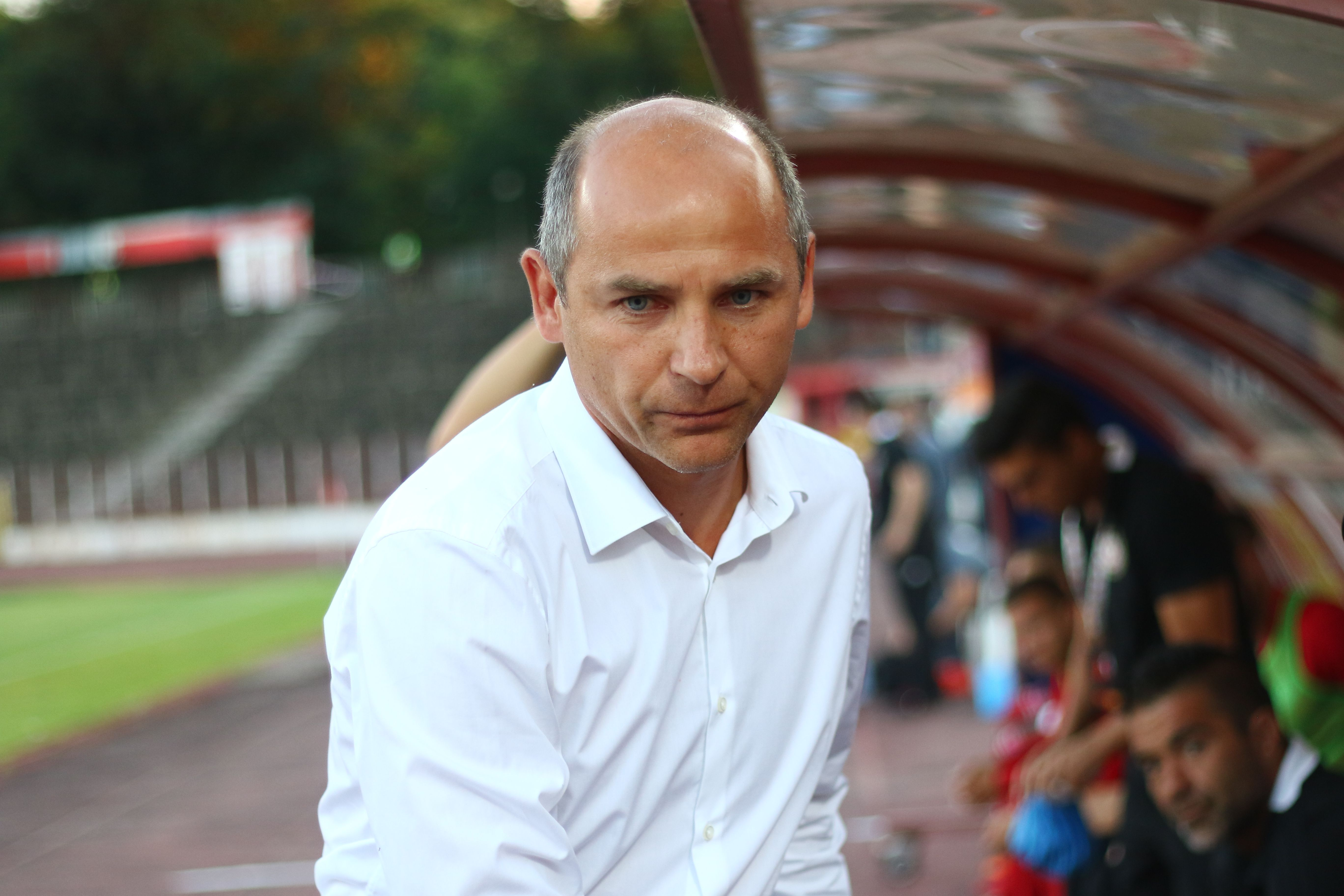
Bundesliga winner Ukrainian Viktor Skrypnyk has won league title with Riga as a manager.

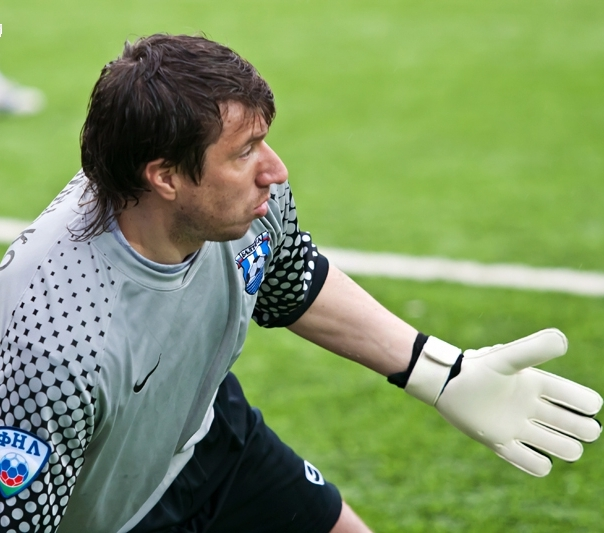
Aleksandrs Koliņko, best known for playing for Crystal Palace has won 6 league titles totally with Skonto as a player and Spartaks as an assistant manager.

== Most titles ==
This is a list of clubs, in order of most titles won in championships in independent Latvia (1922–1940 and 1991 to date). Teams in bold are part of 2025 Virslīga.

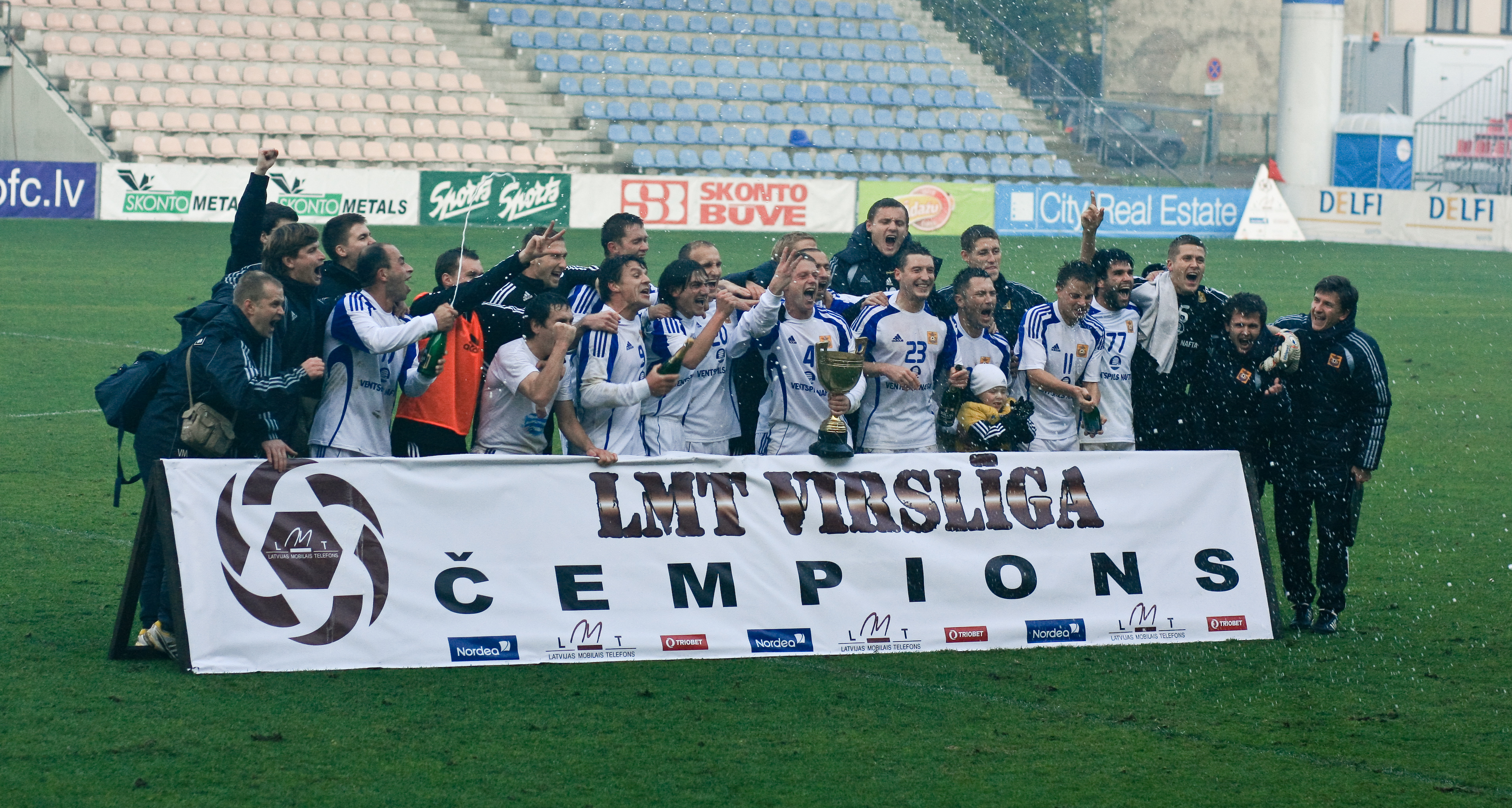
Players of FK Ventspils celebrate after becoming champions in 2008

=== By club ===
Club	No. of Titles	Years won
~~Skonto Riga~~	15	1991, 1992, 1993, 1994, 1995, 1996, 1997, 1998, 1999, 2000, 2001, 2002, 2003, 2004, 2010
~~RFK Riga~~	8	1924, 1925, 1926, 1930, 1931, 1934, 1935, 1940
~~Olimpija Liepāja~~	7	1927, 1928, 1929, 1933, 1936, 1938, 1939
~~Ventspils~~	6	2006, 2007, 2008, 2011, 2013, 2014
**Riga FC**	4	2018, 2019, 2020, 2025
~~ASK Riga~~	3	1932, 1942, 1944
**FK RFS**	3	2021, 2023, 2024
~~Kaiserwald Riga~~	2	1922, 1923
~~Liepājas Metalurgs~~	2	2005, 2009
~~JPFS/Spartaks Jūrmala~~	2	2016, 2017
Valmiera	1	2022
**FK Liepāja**	1	2015
~~Daugava Daugavpils~~	1	2012

Titles won by club (%)
1. Skonto Riga – 15 28.3 (27.7%)
2. RFK Riga – 8 15.1 (14.8%)
3. Olimpia Liepaja – 7 13.2 (12.9%)
4. Ventspils – 6 11.3 (11.1%)
5. FK ASK – 3 5.7 (5.58%)
6. Riga FC – 3 5.7 (5.58%)
7. FK Liepājas Metalurgs – 2 3.8 (3.72%)
8. Kaiserwald Riga – 2 3.8 (3.72%)
9. FK Spartaks Jūrmala – 2 3.8 (3.72%)
10. FK RFS – 3 5.7 (5.58%)
11. Valmiera FC – 1 1.9 (1.86%)
12. FK Liepāja – 1 1.9 (1.86%)
13. FC Daugava Daugavpils – 1 1.9 (1.86%)

== Transfers Virslīga ==
=== Transfers from Virslīga ===
#	Player	From	To	Season	Fee
1	(Nigeria) Tolu Arokodare	Valmiera FC	(France) Amiens SC	2022/2023	2,50 mln €
2	(Latvia) Māris Verpakovskis	Skonto FC	(Ukraine) FC Dynamo Kyiv	2003/2004	2,00 mln €
3	(Serbia) Andrej Ilić	RFS	(Norway) Vålerenga Fotball	2023/2024	1,60 mln €
4	(Latvia) Raimonds Krollis	Valmiera FC	(Italy) Spezia Calcio	2022/2023	1,52 mln €
5	(Republic of the Congo) (France) Gabriel Charpentier	FK Spartaks Jūrmala	(Italy) Genoa CFC	2020/2021	1,50 mln €
5	(Ghana) Patrick Twumasi	FK Spartaks Jūrmala	(Kazakhstan) FC Astana	2014/2015	1,50 mln €
7	(Ukraine) (Bulgaria) Borys Tashchy	JFK Olimps	(Russia) Dynamo Moscow	2011/2012	1,00 mln €
8	(Serbia) (Montenegro) Darko Lemajić	RFS	(Belgium) K.A.A. Gent	2021/2022	900 tys. €
9	(Nigeria) Chinonso Offor	RFS	(United States) Chicago Fire FC	2020/2021	760 tys. €
10	(Latvia) Aleksandrs Koliņko	Skonto FC	(England) Crystal Palace F.C.	2000/2001	750 tys. €

=== Transfers to Virslīga ===
#	Player	From	To	Season	Fee
1	(Croatia) Hrvoje Babec	(Croatia) NK Vihor Jelisavac	Riga FC	2022/2023	1,60 mln €
2	(Peru) (Italy) Gustavo Dulanto	(Moldova) FC Sheriff Tiraspol	Riga FC	2022/2023	1,00 mln €
2	(Costa Rica) (Nicaragua) Anthony Contreras	(Costa Rica) C.S. Herediano	Riga FC	2022/2023	1,00 mln €
4	(Peru) Luis Iberico	(Peru) FBC Melgar	Riga FC	2022/2023	900 tys. €
5	(Ukraine) (Bulgaria) Borys Tashchy	(Ukraine) FC Chornomorets Odesa	JFK Olimps	2011/2012	600 tys. €
6	(Bosnia and Herzegovina) Rifet Kapić	(Ukraine) FC Kryvbas Kryvyi Rih	Valmiera FC	2023/2024	500 tys. €
7	(Ivory Coast) Cédric Gogoua	(Serbia) FK Partizan	Riga FC	2016/2017	350 tys. €
7	(Georgia (country)) Lasha Odisharia	(Georgia (country)) FC Dinamo Tbilisi	RFS	2023/2024	350 tys. €
9	(Brazil) (Portugal) Douglas Aurélio	(Cyprus) Pafos FC	Riga FC	2022/2023	300 tys. €
9	(Lithuania) Audrius Kšanavičius	(Lithuania) FBK Kaunas	Skonto FC	2001/2002	300 tys. €

== Rivalries ==
The most well-known rivalry is the Kurzeme derby (Kurzemes derbijs) between Ventspils and Liepāja. The two biggest clubs in Kurzeme have played 86 matches between themselves with a record of 31–28–27 (including Metalurgs) in favor of Liepāja prior to the 2019 Virslīga.

Since 2016, the Riga Derby (Rīgas derbijs) was started between Riga FC and RFS Riga as two clubs were promoted at the same time. A 2019 match in Skonto Stadium between the two sides broke a ten-year attendance record.

== Virslīga clubs in international competitions ==
UEFA competitions

Ventspils was the Latvian first club who qualified for the group stage of a UEFA club competition, reaching the 2009–10 UEFA Europa League group stage.

Skonto reached the UEFA Champions League last qualifying stage for a number of times in the late 1990s and early 2000s, but lost to teams like Barcelona in 1997, Inter Milan in 1998 and Chelsea in 1999.

RFS qualified for the 2022-23 UEFA Europa Conference League group stage, finishing in fourth place with 2 points.

Most recently, FK RFS qualified for the 2024–25 UEFA Europa League

Commonwealth of Independent States Cup

- Skonto
  - Runners-up (3): 2001, 2003, 2004.
- Ventspils
  - Runners-up (1): 2007.

Baltic League

- Metalurgs
  - Champions (1): 2007.
- Ventspils
  - Champions (1): 2010.
  - Runners-up (2): 2007, 2011.
- Skonto
  - Champions (1): 2011.
  - Runners-up (1): 2008.
