= 1954 Latvian SSR Higher League =

Football tournament

Latvian SSR Higher League
- Season: 1954

Statistics of Latvian Higher League in the 1954 season.

== Overview ==
It was contested by 10 teams, and Sarkanais Metalurgs won the championship.

== League standings ==
Pos	Team	Pld	W	D	L	GF	GA	GD	Pts
1	Sarkanais Metalurgs	18	18	0	0	76	6	+70	36
2	VEF	18	12	2	4	58	22	+36	26
3	Darba Rezerves	18	11	0	7	47	40	+7	22
4	Dinamo Rīga	18	7	5	6	29	26	+3	19
5	Vulkans	18	9	1	8	29	29	0	19
6	Ventspils	18	8	2	8	38	39	−1	18
7	RER	18	7	4	7	27	29	−2	18
8	Daugava Talsi	18	5	4	9	25	54	−29	14
9	Spartak Riga	18	1	3	14	13	53	−40	5
10	Daugava Tukums	18	1	1	16	13	57	−44	3

Source: rsssf.com
