= 1953 Latvian SSR Higher League =

Latvian football league season for the highest division

Latvian SSR Higher League
- Season: 1953

This article presents statistics of Latvian Higher League in the 1953 season.

== Overview ==
It was contested by 7 teams, and Sarkanais Metalurgs won the championship.

== League standings ==
Pos	Team	Pld	W	D	L	GF	GA	GD	Pts
1	Sarkanais Metalurgs	12	10	1	1	38	3	+35	21
2	Spartak Elektro	12	8	1	3	22	14	+8	17
3	Dinamo Rīga	12	6	2	4	13	13	0	14
4	VEF	12	5	1	6	18	20	−2	11
5	Vulkans	12	4	2	6	14	26	−12	10
6	Daugava Talsi	12	3	1	8	16	26	−10	7
7	Dinamo Ventspils	12	1	2	9	9	28	−19	4

Source: rsssf.com
