= 1950 Latvian SSR Higher League =

Latvian football league season for the highest division

Latvian SSR Higher League
- Season: 1950

Statistics of Latvian Higher League in the 1950 season.

== Overview ==
It was contested by 17 teams, and AVN won the championship.

== League standings ==
Pos	Team	Pld	W	D	L	GF	GA	GD	Pts
1	AVN	32	30	2	0	139	9	+130	62
2	Sarkanais Metalurgs	32	27	3	2	122	18	+104	57
3	VEF	32	26	1	5	104	27	+77	53
4	Daugava Daugavpils	32	15	9	8	41	33	+8	39
5	Vulkans	32	16	5	11	44	45	−1	37
6	PAK Zhmylov	32	15	4	13	73	28	+45	34
7	PAK Kasatkin	32	14	3	15	68	57	+11	31
8	RVR	32	14	3	15	55	73	−18	31
9	Dinamo Ventspils	32	14	3	15	38	68	−30	31
10	Dinamo 7 RK	32	11	5	16	54	55	−1	27
11	Daugava Dobele	32	7	9	16	53	114	−61	23
12	DzSK	32	9	5	18	35	86	−51	23
13	Spartak Riga	32	7	8	17	40	70	−30	22
14	Dinamo Rezekne	32	9	3	20	14	62	−48	21
15	Dinamo Valmiera	32	5	9	18	23	72	−49	19
16	Spartak Talsi	32	6	6	20	33	85	−52	18
17	Dinamo Rīga	32	7	2	23	40	74	−34	16

Source: rsssf.com
