= 1952 Latvian SSR Higher League =

Latvian football league season for the highest division

Latvian SSR Higher League
- Season: 1952

Statistics of Latvian Higher League in the 1952 season.

== Overview ==
It was contested by 11 teams, and AVN won the championship.

== League standings ==
Pos	Team	Pld	W	D	L	GF	GA	GD	Pts
1	AVN	20	18	2	0	97	11	+86	38
2	Sarkanais Metalurgs	20	17	2	1	56	11	+45	36
3	Spartak Riga	20	11	3	6	31	23	+8	25
4	Vulkans	20	10	2	8	48	29	+19	22
5	VEF	20	9	3	8	57	31	+26	21
6	Daugava Talsi	20	9	3	8	31	53	−22	21
7	Dinamo Ventspils	20	7	2	11	20	54	−34	16
8	Dinamo Riga	20	4	6	10	26	54	−28	14
9	Dinamo Rezekne	20	5	2	13	17	48	−31	12
10	DzSK	20	3	4	13	18	54	−36	10
11	Daugava Rīga	20	1	3	16	17	50	−33	5

Source: rsssf.com
