= Latvian Football Cup =

- Organiser(s): Latvian Football Federation
- Founded: 1937; 89 years ago
- Region: Latvia
- Teams: ~50 (varies by year)
- Qualifier for: UEFA Europa Conference League
- Current champions: FK Auda (2nd title)
- Most championships: Skonto FC (8 titles)
- Website: Latvijas Kauss
- 2026 Latvian Football Cup

The Latvian Football Cup (Latvian: Latvijas kauss futbolā), also known as the LVBET Latvian Cup (Latvian: LVBET Latvijas kauss) for sponsorhip reasons, is the main knockout cup competition in Latvian football. The tournament was launched in 1937, replacing the previous knockout tournament – the Riga Football Cup.

The competition is a knockout (single elimination) tournament. From 1937 to 2008 and again since 2017, all of the games of the tournament are played within the calendar year.

During the Soviet occupation (1940–1941, 1944–1991) it served as a qualification tournament for the Soviet Cup. The competition was also fully played once during the German occupation of the Baltic states, in 1943.

== Name history ==
On 8 May 2019, a sponsorship deal with the Latvian sports betting company ViensViens (also 11.lv) resulted in the tournament being renamed as the Viensviens Latvian Cup ("Viensviens" Latvijas kauss) or the 11.lv Latvian Cup.

From 12 July 2021 to 2024, the full name of the competition was the Responsible Gaming Latvian Football Cup (Atbildīgas spēles Latvijas kauss) due to the indirect sponsorship by 11.lv that also focused on 'responsible gaming'. While 11.lv were renamed to William Hill Latvia from 2022 to 2024, the branding did not change. The 2025 Latvian Cup did not feature a sponsor name and was known simply as the Latvian Cup.

On 27 February 2026, the Latvian betting company LV Bet was announced as the new sponsor of the Latvian First League and the Latvian Cup, with the Cup being renamed as the LVBET Latvian Cup (LVBET Latvijas kauss).

== Trophy ==
The trophy awarded from the cup's first edition until 1940 was lost during the subsequent occupations of Latvia. After the restoration of Latvia's independence, a second trophy was created in 1993.

In October 2017, a new trophy, that incorporated elements from the 1937 trophy in its design and was manufactured in the United Kingdom, was unveiled by the Latvian Football Federation, since the 1993 version suffered damage during the half-time show of the 2016–17 Latvian Cup Final in May. While the 2017 winners (FK Ventspils) were awarded a temporary award, the replaced trophy was later restored and displayed at the headquarters of the federation.

== List of finals ==
The results of the finals are:

Year	Winner	Runner-up	Score
1937	RFK	US Riga	2–0
1938	Rīgas Vilki	ASK	3–1
1939	RFK	Olimpija Liepāja	5–1
Under Soviet and Nazi German occupations
1940–1942	Abandoned due to Soviet occupation and Operation Barbarossa		
1943	ASK	Olimpija Liepāja	0–2 (H) 4–2 (A) 3–0 (R)
1944–1945	Abandoned due to Soviet advance and re-occupation		
1946	Daugava Liepāja	VEF	4–2
1947	Daugava Liepāja	Daugava Rīga	2–1
1948	Dinamo Liepāja	Dinamo Ventspils	3–2
1949	Sarkanais Metalurgs	Spartaks Rīga	4–0
1950	AVN	Sarkanais Metalurgs	4–0
1951	AVN	Sarkanais Metalurgs	6–2
1952	AVN	Sarkanais Metalurgs	4–2
1953	Sarkanais Metalurgs	Dinamo Rīga	4–0
1954	Sarkanais Metalurgs	Darba Rezerves	2–2 (H) 5–1 (A)
1955	Sarkanais Metalurgs	Darba Rezerves	1–1 (H) 4–2 (A)
1956	VEF	RER Riga	1–0
1957	Dinamo Rīga	Sarkanais Metalurgs	2–2 (H) 3–2 (A)
1958	RER Riga	Tosmare	1–1 (H) 2–1 (A)
1959	ASK	Sloka	7–0
1960	ASK	VEF	1–0
1961	CSK	Daugavpils	2–1
1962	LMR Liepāja	Kompresors	1–0
1963	LMR Liepāja	RTP	2–0
1964	Vulkāns Kuldīga	Tosmare	5–2
1965	Baltika Liepāja	Kompresors	2–1
1966	ASK	Baltika Liepāja	3–0
1967	Jūras Osta	Elektrons	2–0
1968	Starts Brocēni	Venta	3–2
1969	Elektrons	Venta	1–1 (H) 3–1 (A)
1970	FK Jūrnieks	VEF	1–0
1971	VEF	Elektrons	1–0
1972	FK Jūrnieks	Pilots Rīga	1–0
1973	Pilots Rīga	Starts Brocēni	3–2
1974	Elektrons	VEF	1–0
1975	Lielupe Jūrmala	VEF	2–1
1976	Ķīmiķis Daugavpils	Lielupe Jūrmala	1–0
1977	Elektrons	VEF	1–0
1978	Elektrons	Radiotehniķis	3–0
1979	Ķīmiķis Daugavpils	RPI	4–2
1980	Elektrons	Enerģija Rīga	2–1
1981	Elektrons	Ķīmiķis Daugavpils	1–0
1982	Enerģija Rīga	Torpedo Rīga	2–1
1983	Elektrons	Enerģija Rīga	1–0
1984	Celtnieks Rīga	VEF	3–1
1985	Celtnieks Rīga	VEF	3–0
1986	Celtnieks Rīga	Gauja Valmiera	6–0
1987	VEF	Torpedo Rīga	0–0 (a.e.t.) (3–2 pen.)
1988	RAF Jelgava	Gauja Valmiera	1–0
1989	Torpedo Rīga	Celtnieks Daugavpils	1–0
1990	Daugava Rīga	Apgaismes Tehnika	0–0 (a.e.t.) (4–2 pen.)
1991	Celtnieks Daugavpils	Forums Skonto	0–0 (a.e.t.) (3–1 pen.)
Since restoration of independence
1992	Skonto FC	Daugava-Kompar	1–0 (a.e.t.)
1993	RAF Jelgava	FK Pārdaugava	1–0
1994	Olimpija Rīga	DAG Riga	2–0
1995	Skonto FC	DAG Liepāja	3–0
1996	RAF Jelgava	Skonto FC	2–1 (a.e.t.)
1997	Skonto FC	Dinaburg FC	2–1
1998	Skonto FC	FHK Liepājas Metalurgs	1–0
1999	FK Rīga	Skonto FC	1–1 (a.e.t.) (6–5 pen.)
26 May 2000	Skonto FC	FHK Liepājas Metalurgs	4–1
27 May 2001	Skonto FC	Dinaburg FC	2–0
20 Oct 2002	Skonto FC	FHK Liepājas Metalurgs	3–0
28 Sep 2003	FK Ventspils	Skonto FC	4–0
26 Sep 2004	FK Ventspils	Skonto FC	2–1
25 Sep 2005	FK Ventspils	FHK Liepājas Metalurgs	2–1 (a.e.t.)
24 Sep 2006	FHK Liepājas Metalurgs	Skonto FC	2–1 (a.e.t.)
30 Sep 2007	FK Ventspils	JFC Olimps	3–0
15 June 2008	FK Daugava Daugavpils	FK Ventspils	1–1 (a.e.t.) (3–0 pen.)
19 May 2010	FK Jelgava	FK Jūrmala-VV	2–2 (a.e.t.) (6–5 pen.)
15 May 2011	FK Ventspils	FK Liepājas Metalurgs	3–1
12 May 2012	Skonto FC	FK Liepājas Metalurgs	1–1 (a.e.t.) (4–3 pen.)
18 May 2013	FK Ventspils	FK Liepājas Metalurgs	2–1 (a.e.t.)
21 May 2014	FK Jelgava	Skonto FC	0–0 (a.e.t.) (5–3 pen.)
20 May 2015	FK Jelgava	FK Ventspils	2–0
22 May 2016	FK Jelgava	FK Spartaks Jūrmala	1–0
17 May 2017	FK Ventspils	Riga FC	2–2 (a.e.t.) (6–5 pen.)
18 October 2017	Liepāja / Mogo	Riga FC	2–0
24 October 2018	Riga FC	FK Ventspils	0–0 (a.e.t.) (5–4 pen.)
26 October 2019	FK RFS	FK Jelgava	3–2 (a.e.t.)
8 November 2020	FK Liepāja	FK Ventspils	1–0 (a.e.t.)
24 October 2021	FK RFS	FK Liepāja	1–0
20 October 2022	Auda	FK RFS	1–0
25 October 2023	Riga FC	FK RFS	1–1 (a.e.t.) (5–3 pen.)
30 October 2024	FK RFS	FK Auda	4–2 (a.e.t.)
29 October 2025	FK Auda	Riga FC	2–1
20 November 2026	FK Auda	Riga FC	2–0

== Total titles won ==
The following 36 clubs have won the Latvian Football Cup.

Club	Winners	Runners-up	Winning years
Skonto Rīga	8	7	1992, 1995, 1997, 1998, 2000, 2001, 2002, 2012
Ventspils	7	4	2003, 2004, 2005, 2007, 2011, 2013, 2017
Elektrons Rīga	7	2	1969, 1974, 1977, 1978, 1980, 1981, 1983
ASK Rīga	7	1	1943, 1950, 1951, 1952, 1959, 1960, 1966
Sarkanais Metalurgs Liepāja	4	4	1949, 1953, 1954, 1955
Jelgava	4	—	2010, 2014, 2015, 2016
VEF Rīga	3	8	1956, 1971, 1987
FK RFS	3	2	2019, 2021, 2024
Auda	3	1	2022, 2025, 2026
Celtnieks Rīga	3	—	1984, 1985, 1986
RAF Jelgava	3	—	1988, 1993, 1996
Riga FC	2	3	2018, 2023
Starts Brocēni	2	1	1961, 1968
Ķīmiķis Daugavpils	2	1	1976, 1979
Liepāja	2	1	2017, 2020
RFK Rīga	2	—	1937, 1939
Daugava Liepāja	2	—	1946, 1947
LMR Liepāja	2	—	1962, 1963
Jūrnieks Rīga	2	—	1970, 1972
Liepājas Metalurgs	1	7	2006
Jūras Osta Ventspils	1	2	1967
Enerģija Rīga	1	2	1982
Torpedo Rīga	1	2	1989
Dinamo Rīga	1	1	1957
Baltika Liepāja	1	1	1965
Pilots Rīga	1	1	1973
Lielupe Jūrmala	1	1	1975
Celtnieks Daugavpils	1	1	1991
Olimpija Rīga	1	1	1994
Rīgas Vilki	1	—	1938
Dinamo Liepāja	1	—	1948
RER Rīga	1	—	1958
Vulkāns Kuldīga	1	—	1964
Daugava Rīga	1	—	1990
Rīga	1	—	1999
Daugava Daugavpils	1	—	2008

- Bold clubs play in top flight.
- Italic clubs dissolved or merged.
