= Laimonis Laizāns =

Soviet Latvian footballer

Laimonis Laizāns (born 30 January 1945, died 16 November 2020) was a Soviet Latvian football goalkeeper who played for FK Daugava Rīga and Torpedo Moscow. He is considered one of the best Latvian goalkeepers of all time.

== Playing biography ==
Laizāns was still a school student when he was approached by famous Latvian football manager Vadims Ulbergs and offered to start training in football. At first, Laizāns played on the field, but had no special talents. That would change when, for one game, the team he played for had no goalkeeper, and Laizāns was put in the goal. Since then, he only played in goal, although he didn't like it initially because he wanted to score goals.

At that time, most Latvian sportsmen played both football and ice hockey. Until 1965, Laizāns played both and only then decided to devote his career entirely to football.

After a few seasons with FK Daugava Rīga, he got offers from several Soviet Top League clubs. He chose to join Torpedo Moscow, Valentin Ivanov and Eduard Streltsov's teams. In the first season for Torpedo, Laizāns played in 25 matches (scoring 16 goals). But in the winter, while playing ice hockey, Laizāns had an injury which ended his chances to remain in the top league, so Laizāns returned to Daugava. With Daugava, he played until 1976. Afterwards, he played for a few years with FK Alfa in the Latvian championship.
