= FK Venta =

Latvian football club

- Full name: Futbola klubs "Venta"; FK Venta Kuldīga
- Founded: 1964
- Dissolved: 2005
- Stadium: Ventspils Olympic Center, Ventspils; Antons Grundmanis Stadium, Kuldīga (2005)
Home colours	Away colours

FK Venta were a Latvian football club based in Ventspils. They were established in 1964 and went bankrupt in 2005.

== Club history ==
The club was founded in 1964 as Naftas bāze, in its debut season in the Latvian league it finished 6th from 14 teams. In 1965 the club name was changed to Osta and it earned silver medals in the Latvian league. In 1967 Osta won the Latvian Cup 2:0 against Elektrons Rīga. In 1968 the club was renamed to – FK Venta, it reached the cup finals again in 1968 and 1969 but lost both times.

In 1969 Venta won the first Latvian league title for Ventspils under Vladimirs Čikiņovs, a former FK Daugava Rīga footballer. Half of the 1969 league winners were local Ventspils footballers, while the others were from various places, mostly from Belarus. As the Latvian league was officially an amateur competition, for 3 months a year the Venta players had to work in the city port. In 1970 Venta finished second in the league but then the results started to decline and after the 1982 season the club lost most of its financial support. Venta could not complete the 1983 season and was expelled from the league after having lost its first 19 matches.

Until 1988 Venta mostly under different names played in the lower Latvian leagues, but in 1988 it returned to the top Latvian league under the name Zvezda, in their squad it had one of the future defenders of the Latvia national football team – Mihails Zemļinskis. However the sides results were poor and in 1989 under the Venta name the club left the top league. With the collapse of the Soviet Union for several years Venta went into total oblivion, until it re-emerged in the 1st Latvian league in 1994. After the 1994 season the club split into two halves – one of them as Venta continued playing in the first league, but another as FK Nafta appeared in the 2nd Latvian league. In 1996 Venta finished in the 1st league lower than Nafta. After the 1996 season Venta and Nafta merged into FK Ventspils which got a promotion to Virslīga (due to FK Vecrīga from Riga declining the promotion they had won).

Later Ventspils emerged as a new football club under the name of Venta. In 2004 they finished second in the Latvian 1. līga and played playoffs against the team that finished 7th in the league above them (Virslīga), FC Ditton-2. They won both legs 1:0 and were consequently promoted. Before the 2005 season the club moved to Kuldīga and stated its great ambitions to become one of the leading Latvian clubs over a few years, it bought several popular footballers both from Latvia and from other post-Soviet countries – including former Arsenal defender Oleh Luzhnyi, Valentīns Lobaņovs and Aliaksandr Khatskevich – a FC Dynamo Kiev veteran. However the club's finances soon proved to be a bubble, the famous players soon left the club, by midseason it barely had enough footballers to form a starting 11 and after the season it went bankrupt.

== Honours ==
- Latvian top league:
  - Winners: 1 (1969)
  - Runners-up: 2 (1965, 1970)
- Latvian Cup:
  - Winners: 1 (1967)
  - Runners-up: 2 (1968, 1969)
