= Celtnieks Rīga =

Latvian football club

Celtnieks Rīga ('Builder Riga') was a Latvian football club from Riga that won the Latvian Cup 3 times: in 1984, 1985 and 1986.

== History ==
The team was established in the 1960s as ĒCK (Latvian: Ēku celtniecības kombināts, lit. 'Building Construction Combine', in Russian DSK). Celtnieks made its debut in the Latvian SSR Championship in 1978. In the 1980s it was one of the strongest clubs in the Latvian league as it had finished second in the league in four successive seasons and for three consecutive seasons (1984–1986) it then won the Latvian Cup. Especially remarkable was the 1986 cup victory, when in the final game Celtnieks decisively beat its opponent team - Gauja Valmiera - by winning 6:0 under the leadership of managers such as Aldis Polis. Jurijs Jakovļevs from Celtnieks was the best goalscorer of the Latvian league in 1984, 1986 and 1987. In this time Celtnieks was coached by former Daugava Rīga professional Viktors Ņesterenko who in addition to his coaching work also played with Celtnieks. In addition to Jakovļevs club leaders in those years included Družiņins, Trambovičs, Aleksandrs Kokarevs, Davidovs, Samoiļenko, Čebanovs and Simoņenkovs.

After the 1987 season Ņesterenko left Celtnieks for RAF Jelgava and thus the clubs downfall started. By 1991 little was left of its former glory and after finishing in the 17th place from the 20 clubs in the 1991 season Celtnieks didn't get a chance to play in Virslīga in the first season of the independent Latvian league. The club was renamed to SM-ĒCK, it finished 6th in 1. līga in 1992 and became defunct after the season.
