= Lielupe, Latvia =

Neighbourhood of Jūrmala, Latvia

Coordinates: 56.983°N 23.871°E

Lielupe
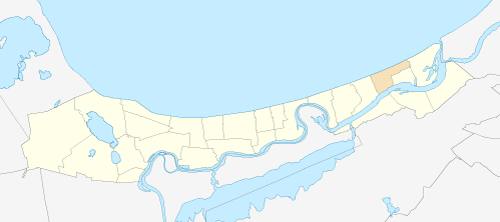
- Location in Jūrmala
- Country: Latvia
- City: Jūrmala

Area
  - Total: 2.6 km^{2} (1.0 sq mi)
- Elevation: 3 m (9.8 ft)

Population (2008)
  - Total: 1,623
  - Density: 624.2/km^{2} (1,617/sq mi)

Lielupe is a residential area and neighbourhood of the state city of Jūrmala in Latvia.

The Lielupe railway station was established in 1913. The Lielupe Tennis Centre is also located within the neighborhood.
