= FK Gauja =

Latvian football club

Home colours	Away colours

Gauja Valmiera was a Latvian football club from Valmiera that played in the top Latvian league from 1979 to 1993. It was named after the river Gauja. In the 1990s another Valmiera football club – FK Valmiera – was renamed to Gauja.

== History ==
Under different names the Valmiera club was playing in the 1st Latvian league for several decades but only in the late 1970s it became known outside its region. In 1978 already by the name Gauja it made its debut in the top Latvian league. Former Rīgas audums footballer Jevgeņijs Katajevs was the club's coach. Local footballers like Valērijs Kuzņecovs, Dainis Andersons, Aleksandrs Madājevs and Jānis Ozols were the leaders of the Valmiera club. In 1983 Andersons and Ozols joined Daugava Rīga which played in the 1st Soviet League.

After several hard seasons in the top league when sometimes Gauja was near to being relegated in 1985 it won its first medals – it finished 3rd in the league and club's forward Jānis Bacis was the best goalscorer in the league. In 1986 and 1988 Gauja also reached the Latvian Cup final. But the biggest success in the history of football in Valmiera came in 1990 when Gauja won the Latvian championship. Modris Zujevs was the best goalscorer in the league in 1990. By then the club was coached by Dainis Andersons who was still an active footballer with the club.

In the newly independent Latvia Gauja started to struggle – in 1992 it finished 10th from 12, but in 1993 the club experienced a catastrophe – it lost 17 from 18 matches in the league (mostly – because of near bankruptcy). From 1994 to 1997 the club played in the second Latvian league, then – became completely defunct.

In 2003 former FK Valmiera was renamed to Gauja thus giving a club under the formerly popular name another life in Virsliga (FK Valmiera was not a new name of the previous Gauja, as both clubs played in different Latvian leagues in mid-1990s). But after the season the club withdrew from Virsliga because of financial limitations and also took up its former name FK Valmiera.

== Honours ==
- Latvian SSR Top League winners
  - 1990
