= FK VEF Rīga =

Latvian football club

- Nickname: VEF Rīga
- Short name: DAG Rīga
- Founded: 1934
- Dissolved: 1995

VEF Rīga (later known as DAG Rīga) was a football club in Latvia, one of the strongest teams in the Latvian league between 1945 and 1994.

== Team history ==
A football club connected to the VEF plant was founded in the mid-1930s. In 1939, it first won promotion to the top Latvian league by beating Ventspils Stars 6–2 in the playoff final. VEF was the only Latvian football club to keep its name through the 1940s – it played in the Latvian league under German occupation and it remained there after the second Russian occupation. The Soviet era was the best for the club: VEF won six Latvian titles between 1970 and 1983, it was also a 3-time winner of the Latvian Football Cup. The first half of the 1970s was the best period in the club's history when it won five of its titles, one cup and also reached the cup final three times. In that period VEF was managed by former FK Daugava Rīga star player Georgijs Smirnovs. Another retired Daugava forward, Nikolajs Jermakovs, played in the team's attack.

When Latvia regained independence and the VEF plant was rapidly losing its former glory, the football team was also affected. However, it managed to finish 3rd in the first season of Virslīga. After the 1992 Virslīga season the club was renamed VEF-Zenta Rīga, the name of the club's new sponsor. In 1994 it played as DAG Rīga and finished third for the second time. The former VEF team ceased to exist in Riga in 1995 with the merger of DAG with Olimpija Liepāja under the name DAG Liepāja. However through the merger with Liepāja VEF Rīga can be considered a predecessor to one of the strongest football clubs in Latvia – Liepājas Metalurgs.

== Honours ==
- Latvian top league:
  - Winners (6): 1970–1971, 1973–1975, 1983
- Latvian Cup:
  - Winners (3): 1956, 1971, 1987
  - Runners-up (8): 1946, 1960, 1970, 1974–1975, 1977, 1984–1985

== See also ==
- Roberts Pakalns
