= FK Alfa =

Latvian football club

- Full name: Elektrons Rīga
- League: 1. līga

Elektrons Rīga (also known as FK Alfa) was a Latvian football club from Riga that was one of the leading clubs in the Latvian league in the 1970s and 1980s.

== History ==
Elektrons was founded somewhere in 1960 as a football club with the Riga asphalt-concrete factory under the name RABR Rīga (Rīgas asfaltbetona rūpnīca). Its first season in the Latvian top league came in 1967 and brought a 5th-place finish and a Latvian Cup final in which it lost to Osta Ventspils.

In 1968 the club was renamed to Elektrons and it won the silver medals of the Latvian league, with 36 points they were a single point behind league winners Starts Brocēni. The next year Elektrons won its first Latvian Cup and had revenge over the club from Ventspils in the cup final. Results in the Latvian league varied for Elektrons – in 1974 they were second again, but in 1976 the settled with a 6th place. In 1974 came the second cup victory, however the best period in the club's history started in 1977.

In 1977 and 1978 the club won two more Latvian cups, and in 1979– the first Latvian league title. Former Daugava Rīga players Laimonis Laizāns, Roberts Skadats and Jānis Dreimainis Elektrons had experience. Next to them was the growing the talent of Aleksandrs Dorofejevs. For three consecutive seasons, Elektrons, under the head coach Gunārs Kungs, won either the league title, the Latvian Cup or both.

In 1981 Dorofejevs scored 37 goals for Elektrons – a result which still is unsurpassed in the Latvian league, and Elektrons won both the league and the cup. After the season Dorofejevs left for VEF Rīga but in the 1982 season even without Dorofejevs the club won another league title (without a single lost match in the season). 1983 brought another cup victory.

In 1984 the club changed the name to FK Alfa and for the first time in several years didn't do well either in the league or in the cup. But in 1985 the club won its last league gold with newcomer Jurijs Andrejevs. Jānis Dreimanis had become assistant coach with Gunārs Kungs. The 1986 and 1987 seasons were very disappointing for the formerly strong club – two finishes in 9th place – and it didn't play in the top Latvian league after 1987. In 1992 Alfa played in 1. līga and disappeared after the season.

== Honours ==
- Latvian league:
  - Winners: 4 (1979, 1981, 1982, 1985)
  - Runners-up: 4 (1968, 1974, 1977, 1978)
- Latvian Cup:
  - Winners: 7 (1969, 1974, 1977, 1978, 1980, 1981, 1983)
  - Runners-up: 2 (1967, 1971)
