= FK Starts =

Latvian football club

- Full name: FK Brocēni Starts
- Founded: 1961
- Dissolved: 1996
- Coordinates: Brocēni, Saldus Municipality, Latvia
Home colors	Away colors

Starts Brocēni is a Latvian football club. It was one of the leading Latvian clubs in the 1960s and 1970s.

== History ==
=== CŠK Brocēni ===
Since the establishment of the town in 1938, amateur factory worker teams from Brocēni started competing in regional tournaments without much success.

The first permanent football club in Brocēni was founded in 1961 during the Soviet occupation of Latvia as CŠK Brocēni. The abbreviation CŠK stood for Cementa un šīfera kombināts in Latvian ('Cement and Slate Combine), as its sponsor was the large factory (combine) located in Brocēni since 1938. In its first year the club won the Latvian Cup and finished 4th in the league. The following years were less successful for the club. In 1965–1967 it got three tenth-place finishes in a row.

=== Starts Brocēni ===
In 1968, CŠK was renamed to Starts, and instantly made history under its new name, winning both the Latvian championship and the Latvian Cup, beating FK Venta Ventspils in the final and becoming the first team from outside Riga or Liepāja to win the league title.

In 1980 Starts finished last in the Latvian league and was relegated. In 1982, they were back but faced another relegation as they earned 11 points over 24 matches. The 1980s were a bad decade for the club from Brocēni which played in lower Latvian leagues. Only in 1991 Starts again played in the top Latvian league and after finishing 9th among 20 clubs it earned a place in the first season of the newly independent Virslīga.

The first Virslīga season in 1992 was not a big success for Brocēni - only 11th place among 12th teams and relegation to 1. līga. In 1994 Starts finished second in the first league and together with Kvadrāts Rīga returned to Virslīga. The return proved quite successful as Starts finished in 4th place, in 1996 they were 6th (as FC Starts Brocēni) but the club couldn't fulfill the financial requirements for the 1997 Virslīga season, so it was relegated to 1. liga.

=== FK Saldus ===
In 1997 when Brocēni had lost its place in Virslīga it relocated to the nearby city of Saldus and changed the club name to FK Saldus. From 1997 to 2000 Saldus played in the first league but before the 2001 it withdrew from the league and moved to the 2nd league, where the club played until the 2000s.

=== FK Saldus/Brocēni ===
In 2004, the club (also known at the time as Saldus FK/Brocēni) changed its name again by adding Brocēni to its name, thus proving the connection with the formerly popular name of Starts Brocēni. In 2005, the club earned a promotion to 1. līga but declined it because of its financial limitations.

=== Brocēni BJSS ===
By the late 2000s, the team was in effect succeeded by Brocēni NBJSS (the Brocēni Municipality Children and Youth Sports School, later renamed Brocēnu BJSS), a municipal football academy, fielding amateur teams in the Second and Third Latvian Leagues. Later it teamed up with the Saldus Sports School (Saldus SS).

== Honours ==
Honours

- Latvian SSR Top League:
  - Winners: 1 (1968)
  - Runners-up: 1 (1973)
- Latvian Cup:
  - Winners: 2 (1961, 1968)
  - Runners-up: 1 (1973)
