= FK Apgaismes tehnika =

Latvian football club

Apgaismes tehnika
- Full name: Futbola klubs "Apgaismes tehnika" Elektrospuldžu rūpnīca Svetotekhnika Riga
- Founded: 1950s
- Dissolved: 1991
- League: Football Championship of the Latvian SSR
- 1991: Group B, 9
Home colours	Away colours

FK Apgaismes tehnika ('Lighting Equipment', also known as ESR Rīga and Enerģija Rīga) was a Soviet Latvian football club from Riga, a four-time winner of the Latvian league. It went bankrupt together with the factory that supported it in the early 1990s.

== History ==
First appearing in the 1950s, ESR Rīga (named after the Riga Electric Lightbulb Factory, Latvian: Rīgas Elektrospuldžu rūpnīca) made its debut in the Latvian league in 1966 and already in the first season won it. One of the club's leaders Nikolajs Jermakovs after the season was signed by Soviet first league club Daugava Rīga. Still the club managed by E. Tantiba won the second league title in 1967.

In 1968 the club was renamed as Enerģija Rīga ('Energy'). In the years that followed, Enerģija was always among the top teams in the Latvian league but the next title was won only in 1976. The Enerģija was coached by Boriss Reinholds who later with good success worked with Zvejnieks Liepāja. In 1977 Enerģija won its fourth and final title, as the club's forward former Daugava Rīga player Anatoli Kondratenko was the best goalscorer in the Latvian league. Another former Daugava player Ronalds Žagars was the club's goalkeeper in 1977.

After 1977 Enerģija failed to win any more league titles but in 1982 it won its first and final Latvian Cup by beating Torpedo Rīga 2:1 in the final match. In 1987 the club was renamed to FK Apgaismes tehnika. The last relatively successful season for the club came in 1990 as it finished fourth in the Latvian league and reached the Latvian Cup final. After the 1991 season the club went bankrupt, some of its players played with Decemviri II in 1. līga in 1992, but the history of one of the best Riga clubs of the 1970s was finished. In 1992 Decemviri II also became defunct.

== Honours ==
- Latvian SSR League winners: 4 (1966, 1967, 1976, 1977)
- Latvian Cup winners (1982)
