= FK Jūrnieks =

Latvian football club

- Nickname: Jūrnieks
- Founded: 1959 (re-founded 2017)
- Dissolved: 1997
- Stadium: Jūrnieks Stadium, Riga
- League: 3. līga
- Website: https://www.facebook.com/fkjurnieks/

FK Jūrnieks is a Latvian football club based in Riga. Founded in 1959, it initially became defunct in 1997. In 2017, the club got reinstated in Latvia's Second League. Since 2023, it has been relegated to the Latvian Third League.

== History ==
Most of the football clubs in the Soviet Union were attached to factories and the footballers were officially factory workers. With Latvian league clubs it was partly true, as footballers usually did indeed work part-time in the factories.

The club most widely known as Jūrnieks was the football club of the Riga Factory of Ship Building and Repairing. In 1959 under the name KBRR the club made its début in the Riga championship, in 1962 it first played in the Latvian league where it got a respectable fifth-place finish, in 1963 it won the silver medals in the league, the following year the club's name was changed to KRR. Until 1967 the club finished in the upper half of the league every year. The club's leaders in the early years were the goal-scoring forward Polukarovs, goalkeeper Kurbatovs and former Daugava Riga footballer Vladimirs Amosovs.

In 1968 the club was renamed FK Jūrnieks, the name that it had in its most glorious years. In 1970 it won the Latvian Cup for the first time by beating VEF Rīga. In 1972 in addition to the second cup victory Jūrnieks also won its first (and only) Latvian league title. In those years the club was coached by M.Titarenko. The most notable footballers of Jūrnieks in the end of the 1960s – beginning of the 1970s were V.Liholajs, Uhanovs, G.Zvejnieks and Vladimirs Trusovs.

However, after 1972 Jūrnieks failed to remain one of the top football clubs in the Latvian league. Never again would it win medals of any sorts in the league, in the Latvian Cup it also never reached the finals again. From 1973 to 1991 it was a middle class team that hardly could compete with clubs like Torpedo Rīga, Elektrons Rīga, Enerģija Rīga, Ķīmiķis Daugavpils and VEF Rīga. The best finish was achieved in 1986 when Jūrnieks finished in the fourth place in the Latvian league. Un those later years the leading players with Jūrnieks were A.Skudra, goalkeepers Gordejevs, Zaicevs and Raitis Gultnieks and strikers Mihails Juropovs and Jaroslavs Petrovs. For several years with Jūrnieks also played Vjačeslavs Fanduļs, mostly known as ice hockey player who played with Dinamo Riga and with Latvia national ice hockey team.

The best goalscorers in the club's history are Jaroslavs Petrovs and Jevgēņijs Samoiļenko both of whom scored more than 100 goals in the Latvian league.

After the 1991 season which Jūrnieks finished in the 14th position it lost its place in the top Latvian league and was renamed to Decemvīri (possibly a reference to the Decemviri). In 1992, under the management of V. Pivovarovs, Jūrnieks with quite a respectable squad which included Andrejs Oļeiņiks, Dmitrijs Horoļskis and Dainis Deglis won the 1. līga tournament and earned a promotion to Virslīga, but it refused from playing there because of financial difficulties and disappeared for a year completely. In 1994 it was back in 1. liga again as FK Jūrnieks, in 1995 it won the 1.līga tournament and earned promotion to Virslīga. The 1996 Virslīga season gave Jūrnieks little to cheer about – 10th place from 10 clubs and relegation. In this year Andrejs Prohorenkovs made his debut with Jūrnieks. In 1997 the club played again in 1. liga and after the season it went bankrupt.

After short stints of existence around 2004, with the team playing at least one season in the Second League. In 2017, the club was reborn and fielded a team in the Second League. After the 2022 season, it was relegated to the Third League. They did not play the 2023 and 2024 seasons, after they played in a amateur league in 2025 and currently play in the third league.

== Honours ==
- Latvian League winners (1972)
- Latvian Cup winners: 2 (1970, 1972)
