= FK ASK =

Former Latvian football club

- Full name: Armijas sporta klubs (Army Sports Club)
- Founded: 1923
- Dissolved: 1970
- Ground: ASK stadions, Riga, Latvia

FK ASK (Armijas sporta klubs) Riga was the Latvian football section of the Latvian Armed Forces Sports Club, founded in 1923. In the 1920s and 1930s it was one of the leading clubs in Latvia. In the 1940s it was disbanded by Soviet authorities, with a new football club of the Soviet Army was created in Riga under the name FK AVN. Later AVN was renamed back to ASK. It became defunct in 1970.

== History ==
=== Original FK ASK ===
ASK was founded as a football team of the sports club of the Latvian army in 1923. In its first year the club earned a promotion to the top Riga division by beating Union Riga. The ASK Stadium (built in 1923) was one of the main football arenas in Riga - the Latvia national football team played many of its home matches there.

In 1924 ASK finished second in Riga, but both in 1925 and 1926 it finished last and thus in 1927 it didn't earn a place in the newly founded Virslīga (first league in Latvia to have clubs from both Riga and other cities). In 1928 ASK earned a promotion to the Virslīga by beating LNJS Liepāja.

In 1932 ASK won its first Virslīga title (in a golden match against Riga Vanderers). As at the end of the season both clubs had equal points and it was the first such precedent in the Latvian league and no regulations existed for such situations to determine the champion, at first the position was that both clubs be awarded 1st place in the league, neither of the teams would be considered the "champion" and Rīgas FK as the previous year's winners would retain that title. However a vote in the Latvian Football Union decided that the champion would be decided in a golden match. In the golden match ASK won 3:1 – Rehtšprehers, Bredersons and Timpers scored for ASK, Jenihs scoring for Vanderer. In 1933 ASK won the Riga Football Cup, in the finals they beat Vanderer again.

Through the entire 1930s ASK was always close to the top but it couldn't win another Latvian title as Olimpija Liepāja and Rīgas FK usually came out with more points at the end of the season, that came only during German occupation of Latvia during World War II.

In 1940 ASK together with other popular Latvian football clubs was disbanded by the Soviets after the Soviet occupation of Latvia, but in 1941 it was reformed as RDKA (Russian: РДКА, 'Riga Red Army House'). During the German occupation of Latvia during World War II, in 1942 and 1943 the club won the Latvian league under the names of RSK and ASK, and in 1943 – the Latvian Cup. In 1944 as the Soviet Army entered Riga the club was disbanded again, one of its star players – Aleksandrs Vanags later became popular while playing with RC Strasbourg in France.

=== FK AVN ===
In 1945 a new army football club – FK AVN – was created to replace the former ASK. In the early 1950s it was one of the strongest football clubs in Latvia that won the Latvian league in 1950 and 1952 and the Latvian Cup in 1950–1952. Still it was a completely different club than the former ASK as it Soviet soldiers from different Soviet republics played with it. In 1953 the club was disbanded as a part of the process of eliminating army clubs all over the USSR. The most notable footballer of this era of the club was the goalkeeper Valentin Ivakin who only played with AVN for one year (in 1952), however later he played with top Soviet clubs – CSKA Moscow and Spartak Moscow and even made one international appearance for USSR national football team. It was restored just a year later and earned promotion to the top league at the end of the 1954 season. Just one year later it was renamed to ASK Riga.

=== Soviet FK ASK ===
FK ASK had a strong dominance in the Latvian league in 1960s as it won the Latvian league 6 consecutive seasons (such a result was surpassed only in the 1990s by Skonto FC). Just like AVN this ASK was a club that did not rely too much on the local footballers, but at least some Latvians did get a chance to play there and one of them was future professional Daugava Rīga and Latvia national football team coach Jānis Gilis.

The second half of the 1960s wasn't as good for ASK as the first one, and in 1970 it became defunct.

== Honours ==
- Latvian top league
  - Winners (11): 1932, 1942, 1943, 1950, 1952, 1960, 1961, 1962, 1963, 1964, 1965
- Latvian Cup
  - Winners (7): 1943, 1950, 1951, 1952, 1959, 1960, 1966
