= 1992 Latvian Higher League =

Latvian football league season for the highest division

Latvian Higher League
- Season: 1992
- Top goalscorer: Vjačeslavs Ževnerovičs (19)

The 1992 season in the Latvian Higher League, named Virslīga, was the second football (soccer) domestic competition since the Baltic nation gained independence from the Soviet Union on 6 September 1991. Twelve teams competed in this edition, with Skonto FC claiming the title.

== Final table ==
Pos	Team	Pld	W	D	L	GF	GA	GD	Pts	Qualification or relegation
1	Skonto (C)	22	18	2	2	51	10	+41	38	Qualification for Champions League preliminary round (Note: The title was decided in a championship playoff as Skonto and RAF Jelgava finished with equal points.)
2	RAF Jelgava	22	17	4	1	43	6	+37	38	Qualification for Cup Winners' Cup qualifying round
3	VEF Rīga	22	14	5	3	46	14	+32	33	
4	Pārdaugava	22	13	3	6	45	22	+23	29	
5	Kompar-Daugava	22	11	6	5	48	19	+29	28	
6	Olimpija Liepāja	22	10	5	7	33	25	+8	25	
7	Daugavpils	22	8	3	11	25	35	−10	19	
8	Torpedo Rīga	22	5	7	10	28	40	−12	17	
9	Vairogs	22	7	2	13	29	43	−14	16	
10	Gauja	22	6	3	13	26	48	−22	15	
11	Starts (R)	22	2	0	20	19	76	−57	4	Relegation to Latvian First League
12	Dilar (R)	22	0	2	20	10	65	−55	2	Relegation to Latvian First League

(C) Champions; (R) Relegated

== Match table ==
Home \ Away	BJS	DIL	GAU	K-D	OLI	PĀR	RAF	SKO	STA	TOR	VAI	VEF
Daugavpils		2–1	2–0	0–3	0–2	0–2	1–6	0–4	1–0	1–1	4–1	1–3
Dilar	1–2		1–2	0–0	0–2	1–2	0–1	1–3	1–2	1–1	0–6	0–5
Gauja	1–4	3–1		0–4	3–1	1–0	0–2	1–4	4–1	3–3	3–3	0–2
Kompar-Daugava	0–0	4–1	0–0		1–0	3–2	1–1	1–2	7–1	2–1	5–1	1–1
Olimpija	0–0	3–0	1–0	2–1		3–3	0–0	1–2	2–0	2–0	3–0	2–1
Pārdaugava	3–1	5–0	5–1	2–1	5–1		1–0	0–0	6–1	2–1	1–0	0–1
RAF Jelgava	1–0	4–0	4–1	1–0	1–0	1–0		2–1	6–0	0–0	2–0	1–1
Skonto	3–0	4–0	3–0	1–0	1–0	2–0	0–1		2–0	3–0	4–1	2–1
Starts	1–5	5–1	0–1	0–4	1–3	1–3	0–2	1–7		1–4	0–5	2–5
Torpedo Rīga	0–1	4–0	2–1	1–5	3–3	2–2	0–4	0–1	1–0		2–0	1–6
Vairogs	1–0	2–0	2–1	1–4	2–1	0–1	0–2	0–2	3–1	1–1		0–4
VEF Rīga	1–0	3–0	3–0	1–1	1–1	1–0	0–1	0–0	3–1	1–0	2–0	

Legend: Blue = home team win; Yellow = draw; Red = away team win.

== Play-Off ==
22 October 1992

Skonto FC	3 – 2	RAF Jelgava
Astafjevs 3'; Jelisejevs 44', 47'		Zujevs 38'; Zarins 70'

Latvijas Universitates Stadions, Riga
Attendance: 2,500
Referee: Vladimirs Direktorenko

== Top scorers ==
Rank	Player	Club	Goals
1	Vjačeslavs Ževnerovičs (LAT)	FK VEF Rīga	19
2	Aleksejs Semjonovs (LAT)	Skonto FC	12
2	Modris Zujevs (LAT)	RAF Jelgava	12
2	Dzintars Savaļnieks (LAT)	FK Gauja	12
5	Jurijs Hudjakovs (LAT)	Kompar-Daugava	10
5	Aivars Pozņaks (LAT)	FK Vairogs	10

== Awards ==
Best	Name	Team
Goalkeeper	Konstantīns Igošins (LAT)	RAF Jelgava
Defender	Dzintars Sproģis (LAT)	Kompar-Daugava
Midfielder	Oļegs Aleksejenko (LAT)	RAF Jelgava
Forward	Ainārs Linards (LAT)	Olimpija Liepāja

== Skonto FC 1992 ==
Pos	Name	Birthdate	P	Goal	Booked	Sent off (straight red)
-	(Latvia) Oļegs Aļohins	27.06.1971	3	-	-	-
MF	(Latvia) Vitālijs Astafjevs	03.04.1971	21	4	2	-
DF	(Latvia) Oļegs Blagonadeždins	16.05.1973	22	1	2	-
MF	(Latvia) Imants Bleidelis	16.08.1975	1	-	-	-
-	(Latvia) Jurijs Dementjevs	20.06.1967	17	3	-	-
FW	(Latvia) Aleksandrs Dibrivnijs	28.08.1969	20	4	2	-
FW	(Latvia) Aivars Drupass	03.08.1963	2	-	-	-
DF	(Latvia) Einars Gņedojs	08.07.1965	21	-	3	-
GK	(Latvia) Oļegs Grišins	09.11.1967	18	–10	-	-
FW	(Latvia) Aleksandrs Jelisejevs	11.08.1971	19	9	1	-
-	(Lithuania) Gintars Kviļuns	17.04.1966	1	-	-	-
GK	(Latvia) Raimonds Laizāns	05.08.1964	5	–2	-	-
MF	(Latvia) Valentīns Lobaņovs	23.10.1971	18	3	1	-
-	(Latvia) Vladimirs Pačko	28.12.1958	1	-	-	-
MF	(Latvia) Aleksejs Semjonovs	02.04.1973	21	12	-	-
-	(Russia) Genadiy Sosenko	15.11.1958	7	2	-	-
DF	(Latvia) Igors V. Stepanovs	01.02.1966.	13	1	-	1
-	(Latvia) Igors N. Stepanovs	21.01.1976	9	-	-	-
-	(Latvia) Aleksandrs Stradiņš	15.10.1968	8	2	3	-
-	(Latvia) Arturs Šketovs	09.11.1968	22	1	-	-
-	(Latvia) Sergejs Tarasovs	16.01.1971	21	3	1	-
DF	(Latvia) Igors Troickis	11.01.1969	9	-	-	-
DF	(Latvia) Mihails Zemļinskis	21.12.1969	17	6	1	1
Manager: (Latvia) Marks Zahodins
