= 1993 Latvian Higher League =

Latvian football league season for the highest division

Latvian Higher League
- Season: 1993
- Top goalscorer: Aleksandrs Jeļisejevs (20)

The 1993 season in the Latvian Higher League, named Virslīga, was the third domestic competition since the Baltic nation gained independence from the Soviet Union on 6 September 1991. Ten teams competed in this edition, with Skonto FC claiming the title.

== Final table ==
Pos	Team	Pld	W	D	L	GF	GA	GD	Pts	Qualification or relegation
1	Skonto (C)	18	17	0	1	63	7	+56	34	Qualification for UEFA Cup preliminary round
2	Olimpija Rīga	18	12	2	4	31	17	+14	26	Qualification for Cup Winners' Cup qualifying round
3	RAF Jelgava	18	12	2	4	34	11	+23	26	
4	Pārdaugava	18	10	4	4	29	13	+16	24	
5	Auseklis	18	7	5	6	22	17	+5	19	
6	Vidus	18	6	7	5	19	13	+6	19	
7	Olimpija Liepāja	18	3	6	9	24	46	−22	12	
8	DAG Rīga	18	3	4	11	15	29	−14	10	
9	Vairogs	18	3	3	12	12	36	−24	9	
10	Gauja (R)	18	0	1	17	14	74	−60	1	Relegation to Latvian First League

Source: rsssf.com
(C) Champions; (R) Relegated

== Match table ==
Home \ Away	AUS	DAG	GAU	OLL	OLR	PĀR	RAF	SKO	VAI	VID
Auseklis		1–0	4–0	3–0	0–1	0–2	0–1	1–0	0–0	0–0
DAG Rīga	0–1		4–1	3–3	0–1	0–0	0–1	0–3	0–0	1–0
Gauja	1–5	1–4		1–3	1–2	1–4	1–6	1–5	1–2	0–3
Olimpija Liepāja	2–2	1–1	7–3		0–3	0–0	1–1	0–2	1–3	0–0
Olimpija Rīga	1–1	4–1	3–0	4–3		1–2	1–0	0–2	2–0	1–0
Pārdaugava	3–0	2–0	3–1	6–0	2–1		0–1	0–3	1–0	0–0
RAF Jelgava	3–0	4–1	3–0	5–1	1–3	2–1		0–1	4–0	1–0
Skonto	2–1	3–0	11–0	6–1	4–0	1–0	1–0		4–0	3–1
Vairogs	1–3	2–0	1–1	0–1	1–5	0–1	0–1	1–6		0–2
Vidus	0–0	1–0	4–0	3–0	0–0	2–2	0–0	0–4	3–1	

Legend: Blue = home team win; Yellow = draw; Red = away team win.

== Top scorers ==
Rank	Player	Club	Goals
1	Aleksandrs Jelisejevs (LAT)	Skonto FC	20
2	Vjačeslavs Ževnerovičs (LAT)	FK Auseklis	10
3	Andrejs Štolcers (LAT)	Olimpija Rīga	8
4	Rihards Butkus (LAT)	FK Pārdaugava	7

== Awards ==
Best	Name	Team
Goalkeeper	Ēriks Grigjans (LAT)	Olimpija Rīga
Defender	Einars Gņedojs (LAT)	Skonto FC
Midfielder	Andrejs Štolcers (LAT)	Olimpija Rīga
Forward	Aleksandrs Jelisejevs (LAT)	Skonto FC

== Skonto FC 1993 ==
Pos	Name	Birthdate	P	Goal	Booked	Sent off (straight red)
MF	(Latvia) Vitālijs Astafjevs	03.04.1971	11	5	0	-
MF	(Latvia) Vladimirs Babičevs	22.04.1968	13	5	3	-
DF	(Latvia) Oļegs Blagonadeždins	16.05.1973	17	2	-	-
-	(Latvia) Jurijs Dementjevs	20.06.1967	17	3	-	-
FW	(Latvia) Aleksandrs Dibrivnijs	28.08.1969	17	1	2	-
FW	(Latvia) Vladimirs Draguns	13.12.1972	14	5	-	-
DF	(Latvia) Einars Gņedojs	08.07.1965	16	1	2	-
GK	(Latvia) Oļegs Grišins	09.11.1967	7	–5	-	-
FW	(Latvia) Aleksandrs Jelisejevs	11.08.1971	17	20	1	-
GK	(Latvia) Raimonds Laizāns	05.08.1964	11	–2	-	-
-	(Latvia) Valentins Lobaņovs	23.10.1971	4	1	1	-
-	(Latvia) Dzintars Savaļnieks	12.08.1968	12	2	-	-
-	(Latvia) Aleksejs Semjonovs	02.04.1973	18	1	-	-
DF	(Latvia) Igors V. Stepanovs	01.02.1966	12	4	1	-
-	(Latvia) Aleksandrs Stradiņš	15.10.1968	15	1	-	-
-	(Latvia) Arturs Šketovs	09.11.1968	13	2	-	-
-	(Latvia) Sergejs Tarasovs	16.01.1971	17	4	-	-
-	(Latvia) Andrejs Troickis	06.03.1970	5	-	-	-
DF	(Latvia) Igors Troickis	11.01.1969	16	2	-	1
DF	(Latvia) Mihails Zemļinskis	21.12.1969	16	6	1	2
Manager: (Latvia) Aleksandrs Starkovs
