= 1994 Latvian Higher League =

Latvian football league season for the highest division

Latvian Higher League
- Season: 1994
- Champions: Skonto FC
- Relegated: FK Liepajas Metalurgs; FK Kimikis
- UEFA Cup: Skonto FC; RAF Jelgava
- Cup Winners' Cup: DAG Riga
- Top goalscorer: (Latvia) Vladimirs Babicevs (14 goals)

The 1994 season in the Latvian Higher League, named Virslīga, was the fourth domestic competition since the Baltic nation gained independence from the Soviet Union on 6 September 1991. Twelve teams competed in this edition, with Skonto FC claiming the title.

== Final table ==
Pos	Team	Pld	W	D	L	GF	GA	GD	Pts	Qualification or relegation
1	Skonto (C)	22	20	2	0	76	9	+67	42	Qualification for UEFA Cup preliminary round
2	RAF Jelgava	22	13	7	2	38	11	+27	33	Qualification for UEFA Cup preliminary round
3	DAG Rīga	22	11	7	4	34	16	+18	29	Qualification for Cup Winners' Cup qualifying round
4	Olimpija Rīga	22	10	8	4	32	19	+13	28	
5	Vairogs	22	9	6	7	28	27	+1	24	
6	Pārdaugava (R)	22	6	10	6	24	24	0	22	Dissolved after the season
7	Vidus	22	8	5	9	21	34	−13	21	
8	Interskonto	22	5	7	10	17	27	−10	17	
9	Auseklis	22	5	7	10	26	29	−3	17	
10	Gemma (R)	22	4	6	12	18	45	−27	14	Dissolved after the season
11	Liepāja (R)	22	2	5	15	16	46	−30	9	Relegation to Latvian First League
12	Ķīmiķis (R)	22	1	6	15	10	53	−43	8	Relegation to Latvian First League

Source: rsssf.com
(C) Champions; (R) Relegated

== Match table ==
Home \ Away	AUS	DAG	GEM	INT	ĶĪM	LIE	OLI	PĀR	RAF	SKO	VAI	VID
Auseklis		0–1	1–0	1–1	4–0	2–0	0–2	0–0	1–3	1–5	0–0	1–1
DAG Rīga	0–0		2–0	3–0	4–0	5–0	2–0	0–0	0–0	1–3	1–0	1–3
Gemma	0–4	1–1		1–2	2–1	3–0	1–3	0–0	0–4	0–4	1–1	0–2
Interskonto	3–2	0–1	2–4		2–0	2–0	0–3	0–0	0–0	0–3	4–0	0–1
Ķīmiķis	1–3	1–3	0–0	0–0		1–1	0–2	0–3	0–3	0–2	1–0	1–1
Liepāja	2–1	0–1	2–0	1–1	1–1		0–0	2–2	0–2	0–5	1–3	1–2
Olimpija Rīga	4–2	0–0	1–1	1–0	1–1	3–2		0–1	1–1	1–1	2–1	1–0
Pārdaugava	1–1	4–2	1–2	0–0	4–1	2–1	1–1		1–2	0–3	0–2	0–2
RAF Jelgava	1–0	0–0	1–0	1–0	3–0	5–1	0–0	1–1		0–1	3–1	3–0
Skonto	1–0	3–2	8–0	3–0	10–0	1–0	2–1	3–0	2–2		4–0	2–0
Vairogs	1–1	1–1	3–0	2–0	3–1	2–0	3–2	1–1	2–1	0–2		1–0
Vidus	2–1	0–3	2–2	0–0	1–0	2–1	0–3	0–2	0–2	1–8	1–1	

Legend: Blue = home team win; Yellow = draw; Red = away team win.

== Top scorers ==
Rank	Player	Club	Goals
1	Vladimirs Babičevs (LAT)	Skonto FC	14
2	Modris Zujevs (LAT)	RAF Jelgava	13
3	Andrejs Štolcers (LAT)	Olimpija Rīga	11
4	Aleksandrs Jelisejevs (LAT)	Skonto FC	10
4	Igors Sļesarčuks (LAT)	Skonto FC	10

== Awards ==
Best	Name	Team
Goalkeeper	Raimonds Laizāns (LAT)	Skonto FC
Defender	Jurijs Ševļakovs (LAT)	Skonto FC
Midfielder	Vitālijs Astafjevs (LAT)	Skonto FC
Forward	Vladimirs Babičevs (LAT)	Skonto FC

== Skonto FC 1994 ==
Pos	Name	Birthdate	P	Goal	Booked	Sent off (straight red)
MF	(Latvia) Vitālijs Astafjevs	03.04.1971	21	7	2	-
MF	(Latvia) Vladimirs Babičevs	22.04.1968	19	14	3	-
DF	(Latvia) Oļegs Blagonadeždins	16.05.1973	20	5	-	-
MF	(Latvia) Imants Bleidelis	16.08.1975	10	-	-	-
FW	(Latvia) Aleksandrs Dibrivnijs	28.08.1969	4	-	-	-
FW	(Latvia) Vladimirs Draguns	13.12.1972	4	-	-	-
DF	(Latvia) Einars Gņedojs	08.07.1965	10	-	1	-
GK	(Latvia) Oļegs Grišins	09.11.1967	6	0	-	-
FW	(Latvia) Aleksandrs Jelisejevs	11.08.1971	21	10	1	-
MF	(Kazakhstan) Aleksey Klishin	01.01.1973	18	1	-	-
GK	(Latvia) Raimonds Laizāns	05.08.1964	16	–9	1	-
-	(Latvia) Valentins Lobaņovs	23.10.1971	16	-	2	1
-	(Latvia) Vadims Mikuckis	10.06.1971	9	-	2	-
-	(Latvia) Boriss Monjaks	11.04.1970	18	4	2	1
-	(Latvia) Aleksejs Semjonovs	02.04.1973	18	8	-	-
FW	(Latvia) Igors Sļesarčuks	31.03.1976	19	10	1	-
DF	(Latvia) Igors V. Stepanovs	01.02.1966	20	8	-	-
-	(Latvia) Jurijs Ševļakovs	24.01.1959	19	2	4	-
-	(Latvia) Sergejs Tarasovs	16.01.1971	6	1	-	-
DF	(Latvia) Igors Troickis	11.01.1969	17	3	5	-
DF	(Latvia) Mihails Zemļinskis	21.12.1969	13	1	4	-
Manager: (Latvia) Aleksandrs Starkovs
