= 1995 Latvian Higher League =

Football tournament edition

Latvian Higher League
- Season: 1995
- Champions: Skonto FC
- Relegated: Olimpija Riga; FK Kvadrats
- UEFA Cup: Skonto FC; Vilan-D
- Cup Winners' Cup: RAF Jelgava
- UEFA Intertoto Cup: FK Amstrig
- Top goalscorer: (Latvia) Vitalijs Astafjevs (19 goals)

The 1995 season in the Latvian Higher League, named Virslīga, was the fifth domestic competition since the Baltic nation gained independence from the Soviet Union on 6 September 1991. Tenth teams competed in this edition, with Skonto FC claiming the title.

== First round ==
Pos	Team	Pld	W	D	L	GF	GA	GD	Pts	Qualification
1	Skonto	18	16	2	0	59	8	+51	50	Qualification for championship group
2	RAF Jelgava	18	12	3	3	33	13	+20	39	Qualification for championship group
3	Starts	18	9	4	5	21	18	+3	31	Qualification for championship group
4	Vilan-D	18	9	2	7	31	22	+9	29	Qualification for championship group
5	Vairogs	18	6	6	6	28	21	+7	24	Qualification for championship group
6	Amstrig	18	5	5	8	26	25	+1	20	Qualification for championship group
7	Skonto/Metāls	18	5	4	9	25	42	−17	19	Qualification for relegation group
8	DAG-Liepāja	18	4	6	8	19	28	−9	18	Qualification for relegation group
9	Olimpija Rīga	18	5	3	10	24	40	−16	18	Qualification for relegation group
10	Kvadrāts	18	1	1	16	10	58	−48	4	Qualification for relegation group

Source: rsssf.com

=== Match table ===
Home \ Away	AMS	DAG	KVA	OLI	RAF	SKO	SKM	STA	VAI	VIL
Amstrig		0–1	1–1	2–3	1–2	0–3	2–0	0–1	0–1	2–2
DAG-Liepāja	1–1		3–2	2–0	1–2	2–2	0–1	1–1	3–1	0–2
Kvadrāts	0–2	3–1		1–4	0–3	0–7	0–6	0–3	1–5	0–2
Olimpija Rīga	0–7	2–2	3–0		0–1	0–1	1–1	0–2	1–0	1–0
RAF Jelgava	1–1	0–0	5–0	2–0		0–1	2–0	3–0	2–0	3–2
Skonto	3–2	4–0	6–1	7–1	5–0		2–1	0–0	1–0	3–0
Skonto/Metāls	2–2	3–1	2–0	4–3	1–1	0–4		2–3	0–8	1–5
Starts	3–0	1–0	1–0	2–0	0–4	0–3	3–0		0–0	0–1
Vairogs	1–2	1–1	2–0	3–3	1–0	0–3	1–1	1–1		1–1
Vilan-D	0–1	2–0	2–1	3–1	0–2	1–4	4–0	3–0	1–2	

Legend: Blue = home team win; Yellow = draw; Red = away team win.

== Second round ==
=== Championship group ===
Pos	Team	Pld	W	D	L	GF	GA	GD	Pts	Qualification
1	Skonto (C)	28	25	3	0	99	15	+84	78	Qualification for UEFA Cup preliminary round
2	Vilan-D	28	16	3	9	45	30	+15	51	Qualification for UEFA Cup preliminary round
3	RAF Jelgava	28	14	6	8	40	28	+12	48	Qualification for Cup Winners' Cup qualifying round
4	Starts	28	11	5	12	31	43	−12	38	
5	Amstrig	28	9	8	11	47	38	+9	35	Qualification for Intertoto Cup group stage
6	Vairogs	28	7	7	14	35	52	−17	28	

Source: rsssf.com
(C) Champions

==== Match table ====
Home \ Away	AMS	RAF	SKO	STA	VAI	VIL
Amstrig		1–1	2–2	5–1	3–0	1–2
RAF Jelgava	1–1		1–2	1–0	0–1	0–1
Skonto	2–1	5–1		8–1	8–0	4–0
Starts	0–1	3–0	1–4		1–1	0–1
Vairogs	2–6	1–2	0–3	1–3		1–3
Vilan-D	2–0	0–0	0–2	3–0	2–0	

Legend: Blue = home team win; Yellow = draw; Red = away team win.

=== Relegation group ===
Pos	Team	Pld	W	D	L	GF	GA	GD	Pts	Relegation
7	Skonto/Metāls	24	8	4	12	37	51	−14	28	
8	DAG-Liepāja	24	7	7	10	26	34	−8	28	
9	Olimpija Rīga (R)	24	5	5	14	29	57	−28	20	Dissolved after the season
10	Kvadrāts (R)	24	5	2	17	22	63	−41	17	Dissolved after the season

Source: rsssf.com
(R) Relegated

=== Match table ===
Home \ Away	DAG	KVA	OLI	SKM
DAG-Liepāja		0–2	3–1	1–0
Kvadrāts	1–0		2–1	0–1
Olimpija Rīga	1–1	2–2		0–2
Skonto/Metāls	1–2	1–5	7–1	

Legend: Blue = home team win; Yellow = draw; Red = away team win.

== Top scorers ==
Rank	Player	Club	Goals
1	Vitālijs Astafjevs (LAT)	Skonto FC	19
2	Oleg Dulub (BLR)	FK Vairogs	16
3	Vladimirs Babičevs (LAT)	Skonto FC	14
4	Aleksandrs Jelisejevs (LAT)	Skonto FC	11
4	Mihails Miholaps (LAT)	FK Amstrig	11

== Awards ==
Best	Name	Team
Goalkeeper	Raimonds Laizāns (LAT)	Skonto FC
Defender	Jurijs Ševļakovs (LAT)	Skonto FC
Midfielder	Vitālijs Astafjevs (LAT)	Skonto FC
Forward	Vīts Rimkus (LAT)	FK Amstrig

== Skonto FC 1995 ==
Pos	Name	Birthdate	P	Goal	Booked	Sent off (straight red)
MF	(Latvia) Vitālijs Astafjevs	03.04.1971	28	19	2	-
MF	(Latvia) Vladimirs Babičevs	22.04.1968	27	14	3	-
DF	(Russia) Vladlen Bausev	03.03.1967	17	10	2	-
DF	(Latvia) Oļegs Blagonadeždins	16.05.1973	20	3	1	-
MF	(Latvia) Imants Bleidelis	16.08.1975	24	1	1	-
GK	(Latvia) Oļegs Grišins	09.11.1967	4	–2	-	-
MF	(Latvia) Valērijs Ivanovs	23.02.1970	24	10	1	-
FW	(Latvia) Aleksandrs Jelisejevs	11.08.1971	29	11	-	-
GK	(Latvia) Raimonds Laizāns	05.08.1964	26	–13	-	-
-	(Latvia) Valentins Lobaņovs	23.10.1971	19	1	2	1
-	(Latvia) Vadims Mikuckis	10.06.1971	2	1	-	-
DF	(Latvia) Boriss Monjaks	11.04.1970	28	8	1	-
FW	(Latvia) Marians Pahars	05.08.1976	9	8	2	-
-	(Ukraine) Aleksandr Pindejev	03.03.1971	9	3	-	-
-	(Latvia) Aleksejs Semjonovs	02.04.1973	19	1	2	-
FW	(Latvia) Igors Sļesarčuks	31.03.1976	6	1	-	-
DF	(Latvia) Igors V. Stepanovs	01.02.1966	20	-	-	-
DF	(Latvia) Igors N. Stepanovs	21.01.1976	23	1	3	-
DF	(Latvia) Jurijs Ševļakovs	24.01.1959	23	3	5	-
DF	(Latvia) Igors Troickis	11.01.1969	27	1	1	1
DF	(Latvia) Mihails Zemļinskis	21.12.1969	29	6	1	-
Manager: (Latvia) Aleksandrs Starkovs
