= 1997 Latvian Higher League =

Latvian football league season for the highest division

Latvian Higher League
- Season: 1997
- Champions: Skonto FC
- UEFA Champions League: Skonto FC
- UEFA Cup: Torpedo Riga
- Cup Winners' Cup: FK Liepajas Metalurgs
- UEFA Intertoto Cup: Dinaburg FC
- Top goalscorer: (Georgia (country)) David Chaladze (25 goals)

The 1997 season in the Latvian Higher League, named Virslīga, was the seventh domestic competition since the Baltic nation gained independence from the Soviet Union on 6 September 1991. Ninth teams competed in this edition, with Skonto FC claiming the title.

== Final table ==
Pos	Team	Pld	W	D	L	GF	GA	GD	Pts	Qualification or relegation
1	Skonto (C)	24	20	4	0	89	8	+81	64	Qualification for Champions League first qualifying round
2	Daugava Rīga	24	13	4	7	35	27	+8	43	Qualification for UEFA Cup first qualifying round
3	Dinaburg	24	12	6	6	37	19	+18	42	Qualification for Intertoto Cup first round
4	Ventspils	24	12	6	6	32	21	+11	42	
5	Liepājas Metalurgs	24	9	4	11	27	32	−5	31	Qualification for Cup Winners' Cup qualifying round
6	Universitāte (R)	24	8	5	11	25	42	−17	29	Dissolved after the season
7	Valmiera	24	8	4	12	29	43	−14	28	
8	Lokomotīve (R)	24	5	2	17	29	52	−23	17	Dissolved after the season
9	Rēzekne	24	1	5	18	10	69	−59	8	Spared from relegation

(C) Champions; (R) Relegated

== Match table ==
First and second round
Home \ Away	DAU	DIN	MET	LOK	RĒZ	SKO	UNI	VAL	VEN
Daugava		1–0	1–0	5–1	0–0	0–2	2–1	1–0	2–1
Dinaburg	1–0		0–0	2–0	1–0	0–0	1–1	2–0	2–0
Liepājas Metalurgs	0–1	1–3		2–0	4–2	0–1	1–2	1–0	3–0
Lokomotīve	0–2	0–1	1–3		4–0	0–4	1–0	1–1	0–1
Rēzekne	0–4	0–3	0–0	1–6		0–1	1–2	0–1	0–0
Skonto	6–0	0–0	2–0	4–1	9–0		5–0	5–1	1–1
Universitāte	2–0	2–1	0–1	3–2	3–0	0–3		0–0	1–1
Valmiera	0–3	0–3	3–1	1–1	3–0	0–5	3–0		2–1
Ventspils	1–0	1–1	1–0	4–0	5–1	0–3	2–0	4–0	

Legend: Blue = home team win; Yellow = draw; Red = away team win.

Third round
Home \ Away	DAU	DIN	MET	LOK	RĒZ	SKO	UNI	VAL	VEN
Daugava		2–2			1–1	0–3	3–0		
Dinaburg			0–1	5–1				1–0	0–1
Liepājas Metalurgs	1–1			3–1				1–1	1–2
Lokomotīve	2–0						1–2		0–1
Rēzekne		3–1	1–2	0–3					0–1
Skonto				4–1	12–0		7–0		4–2
Universitāte		1–5	2–1		0–0	0–3			
Valmiera	2–4			3–2	3–0	2–5	3–1		
Ventspils	1–2					0–0	2–2	1–0	

Legend: Blue = home team win; Yellow = draw; Red = away team win.

== Top scorers ==
Rank	Player	Club	Goals
1	David Chaladze (GEO)	Skonto FC	25
2	Mihails Miholaps (LAT)	Skonto FC	14
3	Sergey Solovjov (RUS)	Skonto FC	11
4	Juris Karašausks (LAT)	Dinaburg FC	10
5	Andrejs Štolcers (LAT)	Skonto FC	9
5	Artūrs Zakreševskis (LAT)	Daugava Rīga	9

== Awards ==
Best	Name	Team
Goalkeeper	Aleksandrs Koliņko (LAT)	Skonto FC
Defender	Igors Stepanovs (LAT)	Skonto FC
Midfielder	Vladimirs Babičevs (LAT)	Skonto FC
Forward	Mihails Miholaps (RUS)	Skonto FC

== Skonto FC 1997 ==
Pos	Name	Birthdate	P	Goal	Booked	Sent off (straight red)
MF	(Latvia) Vitālijs Astafjevs	03.04.1971	14	1	1	-
MF	(Latvia) Vladimirs Babičevs	22.04.1968	16	-	3	-
DF	(Latvia) Oļegs Blagonadeždins	16.05.1973	18	1	1	-
MF	(Latvia) Imants Bleidelis	16.08.1975	20	8	1	1
FW	(Georgia (country)) David Chaladze	22.01.1976	20	25	2	-
MF	(Latvia) Valērijs Ivanovs	23.02.1970	17	-	-	-
MF	(Latvia) Vladimirs Koļesņičenko	04.05.1980	12	3	-	-
GK	(Latvia) Aleksandrs Koļiņko	18.06.1975	12	0	1	-
MF	(Latvia) Juris Laizāns	06.01.1979	2	-	-	-
GK	(Latvia) Raimonds Laizāns	05.08.1964	12	0	7	-
-	(Latvia) Vsevolods Līdaks	22.10.1977	4	-	-	-
FW	(Russia) Mihails Miholaps	24.08.1974	17	14	-	-
FW	(Latvia) Marians Pahars	05.08.1976	22	5	-	-
-	(Ukraine) Aleksandr Pindejev	03.03.1971	9	-	-	-
MF	(Georgia (country)) Alexander Rekhviashvili	06.08.1974	13	2	2	-
DF	(Georgia (country)) Levan Silagadze	04.08.1976	19	-	1	1
FW	(Latvia) Igors Sļesarčuks	31.03.1976	1	-	-	-
-	(Russia) Sergey Solovjov	03.04.1978	20	11	3	-
DF	(Latvia) Igors Stepanovs	21.01.1976	22	2	2	1
DF	(Latvia) Jurijs Ševļakovs	24.01.1959	19	-	1	-
FW	(Latvia) Andrejs Štolcers	08.07.1974	23	9	1	-
DF	(Latvia) Mihails Zemļinskis	21.12.1969	21	6	4	-
Manager: (Latvia) Aleksandrs Starkovs
