= 1996 Latvian Higher League =

Annual soccer tournament

Latvian Higher League
- Season: 1996
- Champions: Skonto FC
- Relegated: Skonto/Metals; FK Jurnieks
- UEFA Champions League: Skonto FC
- UEFA Cup: Torpedo Riga
- Cup Winners' Cup: Dinaburg FC
- UEFA Intertoto Cup: RAF Jelgava
- Top goalscorer: (Latvia) Mihails Miholaps (33 goals)

The 1996 season in the Latvian Higher League, named Virslīga, was the sixth domestic competition since the Baltic nation gained independence from the Soviet Union on 6 September 1991. Tenth teams competed in this edition, with Skonto FC claiming the title.

== First round ==
Pos	Team	Pld	W	D	L	GF	GA	GD	Pts	Qualification
1	Skonto	18	15	2	1	74	9	+65	47	Qualification for championship group
2	Daugava Rīga	18	13	4	1	41	11	+30	43	Qualification for championship group
3	Dinaburg	18	9	5	4	30	19	+11	32	Qualification for championship group
4	Baltika Liepāja	18	8	4	6	23	21	+2	28	Qualification for championship group
5	Universitāte	18	7	5	6	24	29	−5	26	Qualification for championship group
6	Starts	18	5	5	8	20	35	−15	20	Qualification for championship group
7	Vairogs	18	5	3	10	19	32	−13	18	Qualification for relegation group
8	Lokomotīve	18	4	5	9	18	31	−13	17	Qualification for relegation group
9	Skonto/Metāls	18	2	3	13	9	38	−29	9	Qualification for relegation group
10	Jūrnieks	18	1	6	11	11	44	−33	9	Qualification for relegation group

Source: rsssf.com

=== Match table ===
Home \ Away	BAL	DAU	DIN	JŪR	LOK	SKO	SKM	STA	UNI	VAI
Baltika Liepāja		0–1	0–3	4–0	2–3	0–1	1–0	1–0	1–2	3–1
Daugava Rīga	1–1		2–2	7–0	1–0	0–1	3–0	2–1	2–1	2–0
Dinaburg	1–1	1–2		2–0	2–0	0–4	1–2	5–0	0–0	4–0
Jūrnieks	2–2	0–3	0–0		1–1	0–4	1–0	0–0	4–4	0–2
Lokomotīve	1–2	1–5	0–1	2–1		0–5	1–0	2–2	1–1	1–0
Skonto	5–0	3–3	7–0	5–0	3–2		4–1	4–0	11–1	6–0
Skonto/Metāls	0–2	0–4	0–2	1–1	1–0	0–5		2–2	1–2	0–3
Starts	0–2	0–0	0–4	4–1	1–1	2–1	2–1		0–2	3–6
Universitāte	0–1	0–1	1–1	2–0	2–1	0–0	4–0	0–1		0–3
Vairogs	0–0	0–2	0–1	1–0	1–1	0–5	0–0	1–2	1–2	

Legend: Blue = home team win; Yellow = draw; Red = away team win.

== Second round ==
=== Championship group ===
Pos	Team	Pld	W	D	L	GF	GA	GD	Pts	Qualification
1	Skonto (C)	28	23	4	1	98	12	+86	73	Qualification for Champions League first qualifying round
2	Daugava Rīga	28	18	7	3	61	18	+43	61	Qualification for UEFA Cup first qualifying round
3	Dinaburg	28	13	8	7	53	31	+22	47	Qualification for Cup Winners' Cup qualifying round
4	Universitāte	28	11	6	11	37	45	−8	39	Qualification for Intertoto Cup group stage
5	Baltika Liepāja	28	11	5	12	32	44	−12	38	
6	Starts (R)	28	6	5	17	26	69	−43	23	Dissolved after the season

Source: rsssf.com
(C) Champions; (R) Relegated

==== Match table ====
Home \ Away	BAL	DAU	DIN	SKO	STA	UNI
Baltika Liepāja		0–5	2–0	0–2	3–1	0–4
Daugava Rīga	3–1		0–0	1–1	3–0	0–1
Dinaburg	3–0	1–1		1–1	7–0	2–1
Skonto	3–0	1–0	3–1		4–0	6–0
Starts	0–1	1–4	2–8	0–2		1–0
Universitāte	2–2	1–3	2–0	0–1	2–1	

Legend: Blue = home team win; Yellow = draw; Red = away team win.

=== Relegation group ===
Pos	Team	Pld	W	D	L	GF	GA	GD	Pts	Relegation
7	Lokomotīve	30	10	9	11	38	45	−7	39	
8	Vairogs	30	9	6	15	37	54	−17	33	
9	Skonto/Metāls (R)	30	7	6	17	25	53	−28	27	Qualification for relegation play-offs
10	Jūrnieks (R)	30	4	8	18	25	61	−36	20	Relegation to Latvian First League

Source: rsssf.com
(R) Relegated

==== Match table ====
Matches 19–24
Home \ Away	JŪR	LOK	SKM	VAI
Jūrnieks		0–2	0–2	2–3
Lokomotīve	2–1		1–1	1–2
Skonto/Metāls	0–1	1–4		1–2
Vairogs	1–1	1–1	2–1	

Legend: Blue = home team win; Yellow = draw; Red = away team win.

Matches 25–30
Home \ Away	JŪR	LOK	SKM	VAI
Jūrnieks		1–2	1–2	5–1
Lokomotīve	1–0		0–2	3–2
Skonto/Metāls	0–0	2–2		3–2
Vairogs	1–2	1–1	0–1	

Legend: Blue = home team win; Yellow = draw; Red = away team win.

== Relegation play-offs ==
The matches were played on 29 October and 3 November 1996.

Team 1	Agg.	Team 2	1st leg	2nd leg
Skonto/Metāls	1–2	Valmiera	1–0	0–2

== Top scorers ==
Rank	Player	Club	Goals
1	Mihails Miholaps (LAT)	FK Daugava Rīga	33
2	Aleksandr Pindeyev (UKR)	Skonto FC	17
3	Vladimirs Babičevs (LAT)	Skonto FC	16
3	Juris Karašausks (LAT)	Dinaburg FC	16
5	Aleksandrs Fedotovs (LAT)	Dinaburg FC	13

== Awards ==
Best	Name	Team
Goalkeeper	Raimonds Laizāns (LAT)	Skonto FC
Defender	Jurijs Ševļakovs (LAT)	Skonto FC
Midfielder	Vitālijs Astafjevs (LAT)	Skonto FC
Forward	Mihails Miholaps (LAT)	FK Daugava Rīga

== Skonto FC 1996 ==
Pos	Name	Birthdate	P	Goal	Booked	Sent off (straight red)
MF	(Latvia) Vitālijs Astafjevs	03.04.1971	18	12	1	-
MF	(Latvia) Vladimirs Babičevs	22.04.1968	25	16	3	-
-	(Russia) Vladlen Bausev	03.03.1967	10	3	-	-
DF	(Latvia) Oļegs Blagonadeždins	16.05.1973	23	1	-	-
MF	(Latvia) Imants Bleidelis	16.08.1975	20	3	-	-
-	(Russia) Konstantin Ivanov	10.05.1964	6	-	-	-
MF	(Latvia) Valērijs Ivanovs	23.02.1970	27	3	2	-
FW	(Latvia) Aleksandrs Jelisejevs	11.08.1971	15	10	1	-
GK	(Latvia) Aleksandrs Koļiņko	18.06.1975	9	–3	1	-
GK	(Latvia) Raimonds Laizāns	05.08.1964	19	–9	1	-
-	(Latvia) Vsevolods Līdaks	22.10.1977	6	1	-	-
-	(Latvia) Valentins Lobaņovs	23.10.1971	19	3	2	-
DF	(Latvia) Boriss Monjaks	11.04.1970	10	-	-	-
FW	(Latvia) Marians Pahars	05.08.1976	28	12	2	-
-	(Ukraine) Aleksandr Pindejev	03.03.1971	26	17	5	-
-	(Latvia) Igors Stepanovs	21.01.1976	22	2	3	-
DF	(Latvia) Jurijs Ševļakovs	24.01.1959	24	1	5	-
FW	(Latvia) Andrejs Štolcers	08.07.1974	26	6	3	-
DF	(Latvia) Igors Troickis	11.01.1969	26	3	4	-
DF	(Latvia) Mihails Zemļinskis	21.12.1969	24	4	3	-
Manager: (Latvia) Aleksandrs Starkovs
