= 1998 Latvian Higher League =

Latvian football league season for the highest division

Latvian Higher League
- Season: 1998
- Champions: Skonto FC
- Relegated: LU-Daugava; Ranto-Miks
- UEFA Champions League: Skonto FC
- UEFA Cup: Liepajas; FK Ventspils
- UEFA Intertoto Cup: Dinaburg FC
- Top goalscorer: (Latvia) Viktors Dobrecovs

The 1998 season in the Latvian Higher League, named Virslīga, was the 8th domestic competition since the Baltic nation gained independence from the Soviet Union on 6 September 1991. Eight teams competed in this edition, with Skonto FC claiming the title.

== Final table ==
Pos	Team	Pld	W	D	L	GF	GA	GD	Pts	Qualification or relegation
1	Skonto (C)	28	21	4	3	98	27	+71	67	Qualification for Champions League first qualifying round
2	Liepājas Metalurgs	28	17	6	5	62	25	+37	57	Qualification for UEFA Cup qualifying round
3	Ventspils	28	16	6	6	56	23	+33	54	Qualification for UEFA Cup qualifying round
4	Dinaburg	28	11	10	7	49	31	+18	43	Qualification for Intertoto Cup first round
5	Valmiera	28	10	7	11	39	59	−20	37	
6	LU-Daugava (R)	28	7	9	12	42	42	0	30	Relegation to Latvian First League
7	Rēzekne	28	2	5	21	22	80	−58	11	
8	Ranto-Miks (R)	28	2	5	21	25	106	−81	11	Relegation to Latvian First League

(C) Champions; (R) Relegated

== Match table ==
First half of the season
Home \ Away	DIN	MET	DAU	RAN	RĒZ	SKO	VAL	VEN
Dinaburg		0–1	0–0	6–1	0–0	0–1	6–1	1–1
Liepājas Metalurgs	1–2		3–2	7–0	4–0	0–0	4–1	0–0
LU-Daugava	2–2	0–0		3–0	8–2	3–5	4–2	1–1
Ranto-Miks	0–6	3–4	2–1		1–3	3–3	0–0	0–1
Rēzekne	0–1	2–3	1–2	2–2		0–2	1–2	1–4
Skonto	0–2	1–0	2–3	9–0	7–0		4–0	1–0
Valmiera	0–2	2–1	2–2	4–0	3–0	1–4		0–0
Ventspils	0–0	0–1	1–0	9–0	4–1	2–1	0–3	

Legend: Blue = home team win; Yellow = draw; Red = away team win.

Second half of the season
Home \ Away	DIN	MET	DAU	RAN	RĒZ	SKO	VAL	VEN
Dinaburg		1–1	0–2	5–1	2–1	1–4	0–0	0–3
Liepājas Metalurgs	3–0		2–1	5–1	7–0	1–1	2–1	1–0
LU-Daugava	0–0	0–1		2–0	1–1	1–2	0–0	1–2
Ranto-Miks	2–5	1–6	1–1		0–0	2–7	0–3	1–5
Rēzekne	2–4	1–2	2–1	1–2		1–6	0–5	0–3
Skonto	2–1	1–1	3–0	4–0	1–0		15–2	4–0
Valmiera	1–1	2–1	2–1	1–0	0–0	1–5		0–3
Ventspils	1–1	2–0	3–0	3–2	3–0	2–3	3–0	

Legend: Blue = home team win; Yellow = draw; Red = away team win.

== Top scorers ==
Rank	Player	Club	Goals
1	Viktors Dobrecovs (LAT)	FHK Liepājas Metalurgs	23
2	Roman Grigorčuk (UKR)	Dinaburg FC	21
3	Mihails Miholaps (LAT)	Skonto FC	20
4	Marians Pahars (LAT)	Skonto FC	19
5	Vladimirs Babičevs (LAT)	Skonto FC	11
5	Vīts Rimkus (LAT)	Skonto FC	11

== Awards ==
Best	Name	Team
Goalkeeper	Oļegs Karavajevs (LAT)	Skonto FC
Defender	Mihails Zemļinskis (LAT)	Skonto FC
Midfielder	Vladimirs Babičevs (LAT)	Skonto FC
Forward	Marians Pahars (LAT)	Skonto FC

== Skonto FC 1998 ==
Pos	Name	Birthdate	P	Goal	Booked	Sent off (straight red)
	(Ukraine) Nikolay Apilats	21.09.1974	2	-	-	-
MF	(Latvia) Vitālijs Astafjevs	03.04.1971	23	7	2	-
MF	(Latvia) Vladimirs Babičevs	22.04.1968	19	10	4	1
DF	(Latvia) Oļegs Blagonadeždins	16.05.1973	2	-	-	-
MF	(Latvia) Imants Bleidelis	16.08.1975	24	8	2	-
	(Georgia (country)) Mamuka Cereteli	13.01.1979	9	1	2	-
GK	(Georgia (country)) Davit Gvaramadze	08.11.1975	6	–7	-	-
MF	(Latvia) Jevgeņijs Ilovaiskis	22.10.1979	2	-	-	-
GK	(Latvia) Oļegs Karavajevs	13.02.1961	9	–7	-	-
MF	(Latvia) Vladimirs Koļesņičenko	04.05.1980	1	-	-	-
GK	(Latvia) Aleksandrs Koliņko	18.06.1975	5	0	5	-
MF	(Latvia) Juris Laizāns	06.01.1979	26	1	1	1
-	(Latvia) Vsevolods Līdaks	22.10.1977	12	1	-	-
-	(Latvia) Valentins Lobaņovs	23.10.1971	22	1	3	-
-	(Ukraine) Vladimir Mel'nyk	21.11.1979	18	1	5	-
FW	(Russia) / (Latvia) Mihails Miholaps	24.08.1974	25	20	1	-
	(Latvia) Iļja Novikovs	12.08.1977	9	3	-	-
FW	(Latvia) Marians Pahars	05.08.1976	26	19	1	1
GK	(Latvia) Andrejs Piedels	17.09.1970	8	–8	-	-
-	(Ukraine) Aleksandr Pindejev	03.03.1971	15	5	2	-
-	(Ukraine) Vitaliy Rozghon	23.03.1980	1	-	-	-
MF	(Georgia (country)) Alexander Rekhviashvili	06.08.1974	17	1	2	-
FW	(Latvia) Vits Rimkus	21.06.1973	15	11	-	-
MF	(Latvia) Andrejs Rubins	26.11.1978	19	1	-	-
DF	(Georgia (country)) Levan Silagadze	04.08.1976	15	1	3	-
-	(Russia) Sergey Solovjov	03.04.1978	9	4	3	-
DF	(Latvia) Igors Stepanovs	21.01.1976	24	-	3	-
DF	(Lithuania) Andrėjus Tereškinas	10.07.1970	7	2	2	-
DF	(Latvia) Mihails Zemļinskis	21.12.1969	13	-	1	-
Manager: (Latvia) Aleksandrs Starkovs
