= Oļegs Aleksejenko =

Latvian footballer

Personal information
- Full name: Oļegs Aleksejenko
- Date of birth: 12 June 1961 (age 65)
- Place of birth: Latvian SSR
- Height: 1.82 m (6 ft 0 in)
- Position: Midfielder

Senior career*
Years	Team	Apps	(Gls)
1979	Daugava Rīga	3	(0)
1980	Progress Rīga		
1981–1982	Daugava Rīga	70	(4)
1983	Dinamo Minsk	18	(0)
1984–1988	Daugava Rīga	149	(13)
1989	Fakel Voronezh	40	(1)
1990	Daugava Rīga	35	(11)
1991	Pārdaugava Rīga	15	(1)
1991–1992	RAF Jelgava	39	(8)
1993	Gimo IF	16	(0)
1994	Olimpija Rīga	6	(2)
1994–1996	Frankwell FC		
1996–1997	Golden		
1997–1998	Yee Hope		
1999	Policijas FK	1	(0)

International career
1992–1994	Latvia	13	(1)
- * Club domestic league appearances and goals

Oļegs Aleksejenko (born 12 June 1961) is a former Latvia international football midfielder.

Aleksejenko started playing football in the Riga football school under Krišs Maisītājs, his first football club was Progress Rīga where he played under Jānis Skredelis. Later Aleksejenko became one of the key players in another Skredelis team – Daugava Rīga for which he played with several interruptions from 1979 to 1991 (when the club was already renamed to Pārdaugava).

After the first senior season with Daugava he was offered to play in the Soviet Top League with Dynamo Minsk, an offer from which he could not refuse. In 1983 Aleksejenko played for Dynamo rather regularly and won the bronze medals of the Soviet league. But in 1984 he returned to Daugava which Skredelis was desperately trying to make a top league team. In 1985 and 1986 it was nearly achieved and in 1986 Aleksejenko played 43 matches for the club and scored 5 goals. For the 1989 season Aleksejenko joined Fakel Voronezh but then he returned to Daugava.

In 1991 Aleksejenko joined RAF Jelgava with which he was selected the best midfielder of Latvia in 1992. He retired from football in Sweden by switching to futsal – first as a player and later as a manager. In late 1990s Aleksejenko also played with amateur club Policijas FK which in 1998 earned promotion to Virslīga.

Aleksejenko made 13 appearances for Latvia scoring 1 goal, he was the team captain in Latvia's first official match after regaining independence.

== Honours ==
- Best Midfielder in the Latvian League (1):

- 1992
