= Vitālijs Astafjevs =

Latvian footballer

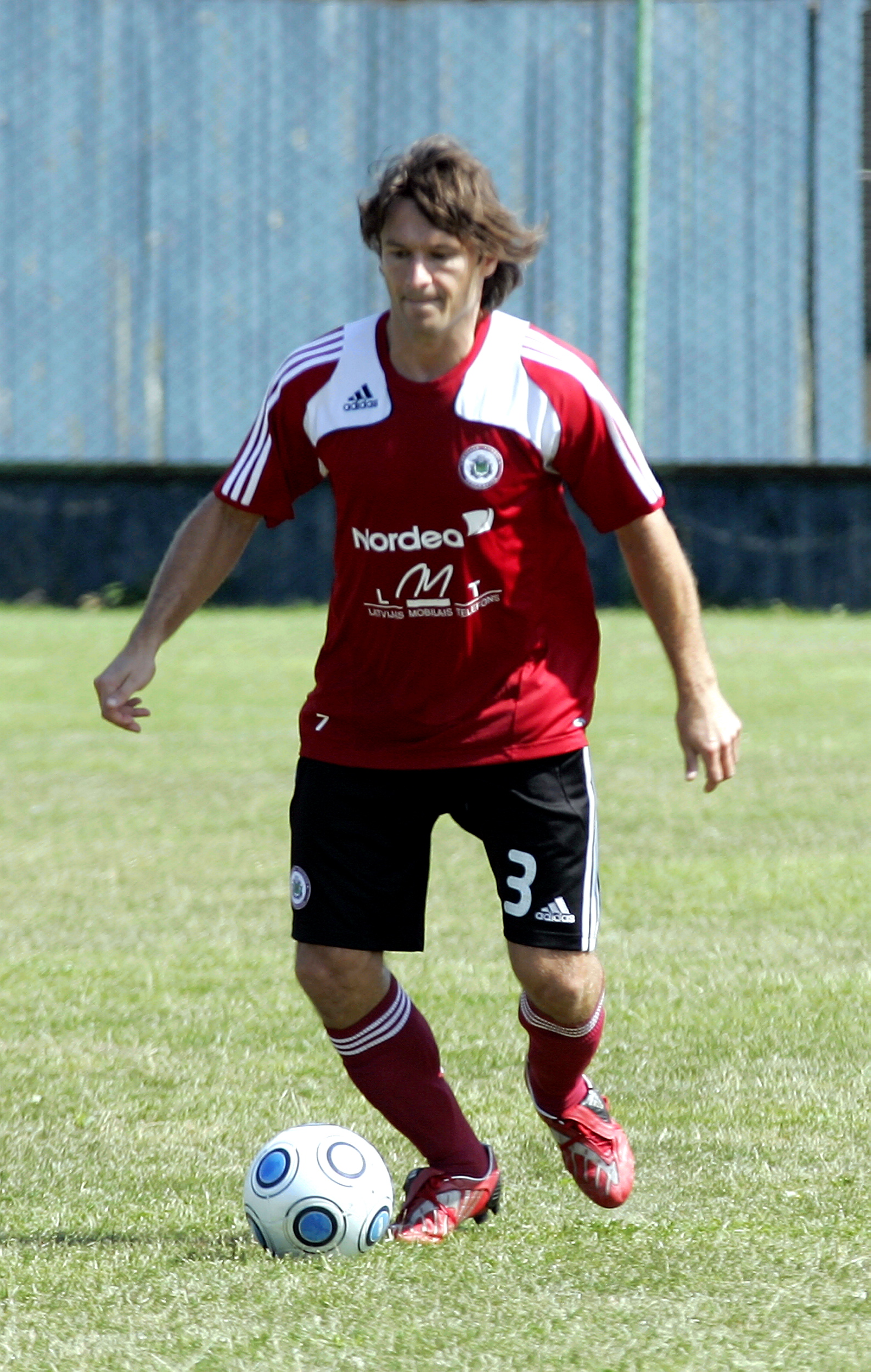
- Astafjevs in training with Latvia in 2009

Personal information
- Date of birth: 3 April 1971 (age 55)
- Place of birth: Riga, Latvian SSR, Soviet Union
- Height: 1.80 m (5 ft 11 in)
- Position: Midfielder

Team information
- Current team: Aris Limassol (assistant manager)

Senior career*
Years	Team	Apps	(Gls)
1990–1992	Daugava Rīga	26	(11)
1992–1996	Skonto	99	(43)
1996–1997	Austria Vienna	26	(1)
1997–1999	Skonto	55	(17)
1999–2003	Bristol Rovers	108	(16)
2003–2004	Admira Wacker	28	(2)
2004–2005	Rubin Kazan	30	(10)
2006–2008	Skonto	26	(6)
2009	RFS/Olimps	14	(1)
2009	Ventspils	5	(0)
2010	Skonto	14	(2)
Total		431	(109)

International career
1992–2010	Latvia	167	(16)

Managerial career
- 2010–2014: Skonto Riga (assistant manager)
- 2012: Skonto-2
- 2013: Latvia U-21 (assistant manager)
- 2013–2018: Latvia (assistant manager)
- 2014–2016: FK Jelgava
- 2020: Riga FC II
- 2021–: Aris Limassol (assistant manager)
- * Club domestic league appearances and goals

Vitālijs Astafjevs (born 3 April 1971) is a Latvian professional football coach and former player who played as a midfielder. He is an assistant manager of Cypriot club Aris Limassol having previously held the role for the Latvia national team.

Astafjevs won nine Latvian championships with Skonto Riga. He also played abroad for clubs in Austria, England and Russia. At international level, Astaefjevs captained Latvia at UEFA Euro 2004. With 167 caps for his country Astafjevs held the European record for the most international matches played, until being overtaken by Gianluigi Buffon in 2017. He is currently the twenty-first most capped male footballer in history.

== Club career ==
=== Early career ===
Born in Riga, Astafjevs started his professional career with Skonto Riga in 1992, shortly after Latvia had regained its independence from the Soviet Union. He played there for five seasons, until 1996, becoming a vital first eleven player. They won the league in each of his first four seasons. Twice, in 1995 and 1996, Astafjevs was named the Latvian footballer of the year. In 1995, atypically for a midfielder, he became the top scorer of the league with 19 goals in 28 matches. In 1996, he moved abroad for the first time in his career and joined Austria Vienna in Austria. He played there just for a season and then, in 1997, returned to Skonto. He played there for three seasons, and won three more league titles. He went abroad again in 2000, this time joining Football League Division Two side Bristol Rovers in England.

=== Bristol Rovers ===
Astafjevs was signed for Rovers by Ian Holloway, who then managed to persuade authorities to issue him with a work permit. He arrived in the second half of the 1999–2000 season when the club were in second place. His fifth match was away to Oldham Athletic and saw him score and set up two more in an eventual 4–1 win, despite being stretchered off. Rovers fell to seventh by the end of the season, missing the play-offs. The following season had them relegated to the fourth tier for the first time in their history. He scored only twice during the 2001–02 season, but in the following campaign he scored four in the last six league matches to avoid a further relegation. He was then released by manager Ray Graydon.

=== Later career ===
In 2003, after being released, he returned to Austria and joined Admira Wacker Mödling. In 2004, after the European Championship, having spent one season in Austria, Astafjevs joined the Russian Premier League club Rubin Kazan. Once again he was one of the team's leaders there. Finishing the 2005 season, Astafjevs decided to join Skonto Riga again, where he became the Latvian champion 8 times (previous years of playing also included). In 2007, at the age of 36, he was once again named Latvian footballer of the year.

On 9 September 2008, alongside his teammate Marians Pahars, Astafjevs announced his retirement from professional football. After a few days Astafjevs declined this fact, stating he could play for a different club. After the new year it was announced that Astafjevs would play for Olimps/RFS and he would also be the assistant manager alongside Andrejs Štolcers and Mihails Koņevs, whilst the manager of the club would be the Dutch coach Anton Joore. Olimps/RFS then hadn't secured themselves a place in the higher league yet, but there was a possibility if the club merged with another team from Riga. After a half season spent there he joined last season's champions Ventspils, who were completing their squad for the upcoming UEFA Europa League matches. Appearing in the tournament's group stages, Astafjevs played only 5 matches there and was released in November 2009. In 2010 Astafjevs returned to Skonto Riga once again and became the Latvian champion with them. After the 2010 season Astafjevs retired from professional football.

== International career ==
Astafjevs debuted for Latvia at the age of 21 on 26 August 1992, against then-European champions Denmark in qualification for the 1994 FIFA World Cup. From that time he was a vital player in the national team, playing there for 18 years. Astafjevs scored his first international goal on 2 July 1993 on his 14th cap, a friendly 2–0 win over Estonia.

In 1999, after the retirement of Vladimirs Babičevs, Astafjevs became the captain of the team. His first match as captain was his 58th in total, against Greece on 31 March in qualification for Euro 2000. On 31 March 2004, he became the first ever Latvian player to play 100 internationals, as they beat Slovenia in an away friendly. As the team's captain, he participated in the Euro 2004 championship in Portugal, playing in all three of Latvia's games. His last international appearance was a friendly match against China on 17 November 2010. There was a special ceremony after the game to honour him. After his retirement, defender Kaspars Gorkšs was elected to be the next captain of the team.

=== Record ===
On 14 October 2009, in a 2010 FIFA World Cup qualification match against Moldova, Astafjevs equalled the European record for the most matches in a national team; Astafjevs went level with the then-record holder Estonian Martin Reim on 157 caps. On 15 November 2009, in a friendly match against Honduras, Astafjevs set a new European record with 158 caps. His European record of 167 caps was matched by Iker Casillas and Gianluigi Buffon in June 2016 and November 2016 respectively, and was later broken in March 2017 by Buffon.

== Coaching career ==
After his retirement from professional football, Astafjevs accepted an offer to become the assistant manager of Skonto Riga. At the start of 2012 he was appointed as the manager of Skonto-2, but was later succeeded by Tamaz Pertia. At the start of 2013 he was selected to be the assistant manager of Latvia national under-21 football team, coached by his former club and international team-mate Marians Pahars. On 11 July 2013, Pahars became the manager of Latvia national football team and chose Astafjevs to be one of his assistants. On 4 June 2014, Astafjevs became the manager of FK Jelgava. In April 2018 Astafjevs left the assistant manager's position of the Latvia national team, following the sacking of head coach Aleksandrs Starkovs.

In January 2019, Astafjevs was appointed as the new coach of the Pafos FC academy, taking charge of the U17 and U19 age groups. In 2020, he returned to Latvia as the head coach of the Latvia U17 team as well as the assistant head coach of FK Auda. In 2021, he again departed Latvia to return to Cyprus as assistant manager of Aris Limassol.

== Career statistics ==
Appearances and goals by national team and year
National team	Year	Apps	Goals
Latvia	1992	7	0
Latvia	1993	8	1
Latvia	1994	8	3
Latvia	1995	9	2
Latvia	1996	6	0
Latvia	1997	9	1
Latvia	1998	9	0
Latvia	1999	7	2
Latvia	2000	7	0
Latvia	2001	10	1
Latvia	2002	8	0
Latvia	2003	10	0
Latvia	2004	12	1
Latvia	2005	14	1
Latvia	2006	5	0
Latvia	2007	11	1
Latvia	2008	10	2
Latvia	2009	8	1
Latvia	2010	9	0
Total		167	16

Scores and results list Latvia's goal tally first, score column indicates score after each Astafjevs goal.

List of international goals scored by Vitālijs Astafjevs
No.	Date	Venue	Opponent	Score	Result	Competition	Ref.
1	2 July 1993	Pärnu Rannastaadion, Pärnu, Estonia	Estonia	1–0	2–0	1993 Baltic Cup	
2	2 June 1994	Daugava Stadium, Riga, Latvia	Malta	2–0	2–0	Friendly	
3	26 June 1994	Latvijas Universitātes stadions, Riga, Latvia	Georgia	1–1	1–3	Friendly	
4	30 July 1994	Žalgiris Stadium, Vilnius Lithuania	Estonia	1–0	2–0	1994 Baltic Cup	
5	21 May 1995	Daugava Stadium, Riga, Latvia	Lithuania	2–0	2–0	1995 Baltic Cup	
6	7 June 1995	Windsor Park, Belfast, Northern Ireland	Northern Ireland	2–1	2–1	UEFA Euro 1996 qualifying	
7	8 June 1997	Daugava Stadium, Riga, Latvia	Austria	1–3	1–3	1998 FIFA World Cup qualification	
8	4 September 1999	Arena Kombëtare, Tirana, Albania	Albania	1–0	3–3	Friendly	
9	4 September 1999	Arena Kombëtare, Tirana, Albania	Albania	2–1	3–3	Friendly	
10	14 November 2001	Skonto Stadium, Riga, Latvia	Russia	1–3	1–3	Friendly	
11	13 October 2004	Skonto Stadium, Riga, Latvia	Estonia	1–0	2–2	2006 FIFA World Cup qualification	
12	17 August 2005	Skonto Stadium, Riga, Latvia	Russia	1–0	1–1	2006 FIFA World Cup qualification	
13	22 August 2007	Skonto Stadium, Riga, Latvia	Moldova	1–1	1–2	Friendly	
14	6 February 2008	Boris Paitchadze National Stadium, Tbilisi, Georgia	Georgia	3–0	3–1	Friendly	
15	6 September 2008	Sheriff Arena, Tiraspol, Moldova	Moldova	2–0	2–1	2010 FIFA World Cup qualification	
16	9 September 2009	Skonto Stadium, Riga, Latvia	Switzerland	2–1	2–2	2010 FIFA World Cup qualification	

== Honours ==
Skonto

- Latvian Higher League: 1992, 1993, 1994, 1995, 1996, 1997, 1998, 1999, 2010
- Latvian Football Cup: 1992, 1995, 1997, 1998

Latvia

- Baltic Cup: 1993, 1995, 2001, 2003, 2008

Individual

- Virsliga top scorer: 1995
- Latvian Footballer of the Year: 1995, 1996, 2007

== See also ==
- List of men's footballers with 100 or more international caps
