= Dzintars Sproģis =

Latvian footballer

Personal information
- Date of birth: 31 May 1971 (age 55)
- Height: 1.90 m (6 ft 3 in)
- Position: Defender

Youth career
- RFSh Riga

Senior career*
Years	Team	Apps	(Gls)
1988	Zvejnieks Liepāja	1	(0)
1988	FC Latviya-Molodyozhnaya Riga		
1989	FC Daugava Riga	3	(0)
1989–1991	RAF Jelgava	84	(1)
1992	FC Kompar-Daugava Rīga	14	(3)
1992–1993	K. Tesamen Hogerop Diest		
1994	FK DAG	21	(3)
1995	FC Kolos Krasnodar	19	(0)
1995	RAF Jelgava	10	(0)
1996	FC Energiya-Tekstilshchik Kamyshin	7	(0)
1997	FK Liepājas Metalurgs	21	(1)
1998	LU/Daugava Rīga	22	(2)
1999	FC Universitāte Rīga	24	(0)
1999–2000	FK Rīga	47	(3)
2002	FC Kaisar	7	(0)
2002	FK Rīga	9	(0)

International career
1992–1998	Latvia	20	(3)
- * Club domestic league appearances and goals

Dzintars Sproģis (born 13 May 1971) is a former Latvian football defender. Sproģis was recognized as the best defender in the first season of Virslīga.

== Playing biography ==
Dzintars Sproģis came from a sporting family - his father Aivars played for Darba reserves and Dzintars' older brother Haralds Sproģis was also a footballer with whom Dzintars played together in several clubs.

The first club that Dzintars played with was Zvejnieks Liepāja in 1988 (at the age of just 17) from which he moved to RAF Jelgava in 1989. In 1989, he also made a debut with Daugava Rīga. With RAF he played in lower Soviet leagues. In the first Virslīga season Dzintars joined former Daugava head coach Jānis Skredelis with Kompar-Daugava but in 1993 he went to play abroad - with KTH Diest in Belgium. In 1994 Sproģis returned to Latvia where with FC DAG Rīga he won the bronze medals of Virslīga and reached the Latvian Cup final.

In 1995 and 1996 Sproģis played in Russia - first with Kolos Krasnodar, then with Tekstilshchik Kamyshin. When Tekstilshchik was relegated from the top division Sproģis returned to Liepāja where his career had started and joined Baltika Liepāja. In 1998 Sproģis was already in another club - he had joined Daugava/LU which performed rather poorly and in 1999 Sproģis changed the club again - he joined the newly formed FK Rīga (which was formed on the basis of Daugava/LU) with which he won the Latvian Cup in 1999. His last club was FC Kaisar in Kazakhstan. In 2002 Dzintars Sproģis finished his playing career.

Sproģis also played 23 international matches for Latvia national football team from 1992 to 1998. His international debut came in Latvia's first match after it regained independence - a loss of 0:2 against Romania in a friendly match. His last match for Latvia was also a friendly game 2:0 win against Andorra in Pärnu, Estonia.

== Honours ==
- Best Defender in the Latvian League (1):
  - 1992
