= Pardaugava Riga =

Pardaugava Riga may refer to:

- FK Pārdaugava, Riga football club
- Dinamo Riga (original), Riga hockey club
