= FK Bodø/Glimt in European football =

- Club: FK Bodø/Glimt
- First entry: 1976–77 European Cup Winners' Cup
- Latest entry: 2026–27 UEFA Champions League

FK Bodø/Glimt is a Norwegian football club from the city of Bodø.

== Overall record ==
As of 20 October 2026

| Competition | Played | Won | Drew | Lost | GF | GA | GD | Win% |
|---|---|---|---|---|---|---|---|---|
| European Cup / Champions League | 37 | 19 | 5 | 13 | 90 | 58 | +32 | 51.35 |
| UEFA Cup / UEFA Europa League | 39 | 14 | 6 | 19 | 60 | 59 | +1 | 35.90 |
| UEFA Europa Conference League | 32 | 19 | 8 | 5 | 69 | 36 | +33 | 59.38 |
| European Cup Winners' Cup | 10 | 4 | 2 | 4 | 14 | 16 | −2 | 40.00 |
| Total | 118 | 56 | 21 | 41 | 223 | 169 | +54 | 47.46 |

== Results ==
Notes

- PR: Preliminary round
- 1Q: First qualifying round
- 2Q: Second qualifying round
- 3Q: Third qualifying round
- 1R: First round
- 2R: Second round
- PO: Play-off round
- GS: Group stage
- LP: League phase
- KPO: Knockout play-offs
- R16: Round of 16
- QF: Quarter-finals
- SF: Semi-finals

| Season | Competition | Round | Opponent | Home | Away | Aggregate |
|---|---|---|---|---|---|---|
| 1976–77 | European Cup Winners' Cup | 1R | (Italy) Napoli | 0–2 | 0–1 | 0–3 |
| 1978–79 | European Cup Winners' Cup | 1R | Union Luxembourg | 4–1 | 0–1 | 4–2 |
| 1978–79 | European Cup Winners' Cup | 2R | (Italy) Internazionale | 1–2 | 0–5 | 1–7 |
| 1994–95 | UEFA Cup Winners' Cup | QR | (Latvia) Olimpija Rīga | 6–0 | 0–0 | 6–0 |
| 1994–95 | UEFA Cup Winners' Cup | 1R | (Italy) Sampdoria | 3–2 | 0–2 | 3–4 |
| 1996–97 | UEFA Cup | QR | (Israel) Beitar Jerusalem | 2–1 | 5–1 | 7–2 |
| 1996–97 | UEFA Cup | 1R | (Turkey) Trabzonspor | 1–2 | 1–3 | 2–5 |
| 1999–2000 | UEFA Cup | QR | (Liechtenstein) Vaduz | 1–0 | 2–1 | 3–1 |
| 1999–2000 | UEFA Cup | 1R | (Germany) Werder Bremen | 0–5 | 1–1 | 1–6 |
| 2004–05 | UEFA Cup | 2QR | (Estonia) Levadia Tallinn | 2–1 | 1–2 (a.e.t.) | 3–3 (8–7 p) |
| 2004–05 | UEFA Cup | 1R | (Turkey) Beşiktaş | 1–1 | 0–1 | 1–2 |
| 2020–21 | UEFA Europa League | 1QR | (Lithuania) Kauno Žalgiris | 6–1 | —N/a | —N/a |
| 2020–21 | UEFA Europa League | 2QR | (Lithuania) Žalgiris | 3–1 | —N/a | —N/a |
| 2020–21 | UEFA Europa League | 3QR | (Italy) Milan | —N/a | 2–3 | —N/a |
| 2021–22 | UEFA Champions League | 1QR | (Poland) Legia Warsaw | 2–3 | 0–2 | 2–5 |
| 2021–22 | UEFA Europa Conference League | 2QR | (Iceland) Valur | 3–0 | 3–0 | 6–0 |
| 2021–22 | UEFA Europa Conference League | 3QR | (Kosovo) Prishtina | 2–0 | 1–2 | 3–2 |
| 2021–22 | UEFA Europa Conference League | PO | (Lithuania) Žalgiris | 1–0 | 2–2 | 3–2 |
| 2021–22 | UEFA Europa Conference League | GS | (Ukraine) Zorya Luhansk | 3–1 | 1–1 | 2nd |
| 2021–22 | UEFA Europa Conference League | GS | (Bulgaria) CSKA Sofia | 2–0 | 0–0 | 2nd |
| 2021–22 | UEFA Europa Conference League | GS | (Italy) Roma | 6–1 | 2–2 | 2nd |
| 2021–22 | UEFA Europa Conference League | KPO | (Scotland) Celtic | 2–0 | 3–1 | 5–1 |
| 2021–22 | UEFA Europa Conference League | R16 | (Netherlands) AZ | 2–1 | 2–2 (a.e.t.) | 4–3 |
| 2021–22 | UEFA Europa Conference League | QF | (Italy) Roma | 2–1 | 0–4 | 2–5 |
| 2022–23 | UEFA Champions League | 1QR | (Faroe Islands) KÍ | 3–0 | 1–3 | 4–3 |
| 2022–23 | UEFA Champions League | 2QR | (Northern Ireland) Linfield | 8–0 | 0–1 | 8–1 |
| 2022–23 | UEFA Champions League | 3QR | (Lithuania) Žalgiris | 5–0 | 1–1 | 5–1 |
| 2022–23 | UEFA Champions League | PO | (Croatia) Dinamo Zagreb | 1–0 | 1–4 (a.e.t.) | 2–4 |
| 2022–23 | UEFA Europa League | GS | (England) Arsenal | 0–1 | 0–3 | 3rd |
| 2022–23 | UEFA Europa League | GS | (Netherlands) PSV Eindhoven | 1–2 | 1–1 | 3rd |
| 2022–23 | UEFA Europa League | GS | (Switzerland) Zürich | 2–1 | 1–2 | 3rd |
| 2022–23 | UEFA Europa Conference League | KPO | (Poland) Lech Poznań | 0–0 | 0–1 | 0–1 |
| 2023–24 | UEFA Europa Conference League | 2QR | (Czech Republic) Bohemians 1905 | 3–0 | 4–2 | 7–2 |
| 2023–24 | UEFA Europa Conference League | 3QR | (Armenia) Pyunik | 3–0 | 3–0 | 6–0 |
| 2023–24 | UEFA Europa Conference League | PO | (Romania) Sepsi OSK | 3–2 (a.e.t.) | 2–2 | 5–4 |
| 2023–24 | UEFA Europa Conference League | GS | (Belgium) Club Brugge | 0–1 | 1–3 | 2nd |
| 2023–24 | UEFA Europa Conference League | GS | (Turkey) Beşiktaş | 3–1 | 2–1 | 2nd |
| 2023–24 | UEFA Europa Conference League | GS | (Switzerland) Lugano | 5–2 | 0–0 | 2nd |
| 2023–24 | UEFA Europa Conference League | KPO | (Netherlands) Ajax | 1–2 (a.e.t.) | 2–2 | 3–4 |
| 2024–25 | UEFA Champions League | 2QR | (Latvia) RFS | 4–0 | 3–1 | 7–1 |
| 2024–25 | UEFA Champions League | 3QR | (Poland) Jagiellonia Białystok | 4–1 | 1–0 | 5–1 |
| 2024–25 | UEFA Champions League | PO | (Serbia) Red Star Belgrade | 2–1 | 0–2 | 2–3 |
| 2024–25 | UEFA Europa League | LP | (Portugal) Porto | 3–2 | —N/a | 9th |
| 2024–25 | UEFA Europa League | LP | (Belgium) Union Saint-Gilloise | —N/a | 0–0 | 9th |
| 2024–25 | UEFA Europa League | LP | (Portugal) Braga | —N/a | 2–1 | 9th |
| 2024–25 | UEFA Europa League | LP | (Azerbaijan) Qarabağ | 1–2 | —N/a | 9th |
| 2024–25 | UEFA Europa League | LP | (England) Manchester United | —N/a | 1–2 | 9th |
| 2024–25 | UEFA Europa League | LP | (Turkey) Beşiktaş | 2–1 | —N/a | 9th |
| 2024–25 | UEFA Europa League | LP | (Israel) Maccabi Tel Aviv | 3–1 | —N/a | 9th |
| 2024–25 | UEFA Europa League | LP | (France) Nice | —N/a | 1–1 | 9th |
| 2024–25 | UEFA Europa League | KPO | (Netherlands) Twente | 5–2 (a.e.t.) | 1–2 | 6–4 |
| 2024–25 | UEFA Europa League | R16 | (Greece) Olympiacos | 3–0 | 1–2 | 4–2 |
| 2024–25 | UEFA Europa League | QF | (Italy) Lazio | 2–0 | 1–3 (a.e.t.) | 3–3 (3–2 p) |
| 2024–25 | UEFA Europa League | SF | (England) Tottenham Hotspur | 0–2 | 1–3 | 1–5 |
| 2025–26 | UEFA Champions League | PO | (Austria) Sturm Graz | 5–0 | 1–2 | 6–2 |
| 2025–26 | UEFA Champions League | LP | (Czech Republic) Slavia Prague | —N/a | 2–2 | 23rd |
| 2025–26 | UEFA Champions League | LP | (England) Tottenham Hotspur | 2–2 | —N/a | 23rd |
| 2025–26 | UEFA Champions League | LP | (Turkey) Galatasaray | —N/a | 1–3 | 23rd |
| 2025–26 | UEFA Champions League | LP | (France) Monaco | 0–1 | —N/a | 23rd |
| 2025–26 | UEFA Champions League | LP | (Italy) Juventus | 2–3 | —N/a | 23rd |
| 2025–26 | UEFA Champions League | LP | (Germany) Borussia Dortmund | —N/a | 2–2 | 23rd |
| 2025–26 | UEFA Champions League | LP | (England) Manchester City | 3–1 | —N/a | 23rd |
| 2025–26 | UEFA Champions League | LP | (Spain) Atlético Madrid | —N/a | 2–1 | 23rd |
| 2025–26 | UEFA Champions League | KPO | (Italy) Internazionale | 3–1 | 2–1 | 5–2 |
| 2025–26 | UEFA Champions League | R16 | (Portugal) Sporting CP | 3–0 | 0–5 (a.e.t.) | 3–5 |
| 2026–27 | UEFA Champions League | 3QR | (Belgium) Union Saint-Gilloise | 3–2 (a.e.t.) | 3–3 | 6–5 |
| 2026–27 | UEFA Champions League | PO | (Netherlands) NEC | 3–0 | 3–1 | 6–1 |
| 2026–27 | UEFA Champions League | LP | (Germany) Bayern Munich | —N/a | 0–5 | |
| 2026–27 | UEFA Champions League | LP | (Germany) Borussia Dortmund | 1–0 | —N/a | |
| 2026–27 | UEFA Champions League | LP | (Italy) Napoli | —N/a | 3–4 | |
| 2026–27 | UEFA Champions League | LP | (France) Lille | | —N/a | |
| 2026–27 | UEFA Champions League | LP | (Austria) LASK | | —N/a | |
| 2026–27 | UEFA Champions League | LP | (France) Lens | —N/a | | |
| 2026–27 | UEFA Champions League | LP | (Spain) Atlético Madrid | | —N/a | |
| 2026–27 | UEFA Champions League | LP | (Belgium) Club Brugge | —N/a | | |
