= FC Neftekhimik Nizhnekamsk =

Russian football club

- Full name: Football Club Neftekhimik Nizhnekamsk
- Founded: 1991; 35 years ago
- Ground: Neftekhimik Stadium
- Capacity: 3,100
- General director: Valery Kalachyov
- Manager: Robert Yevdokimov
- League: Russian First League
- 2025–26: 11th of 18
- Website: fcnh.ru
Home colours	Away colours

FC Neftekhimik Nizhnekamsk (Russian: ФК «Нефтехимик» Нижнекамск) is an association football club from Nizhnekamsk, Russia, founded in 1991. It played at the second-highest level in the Russian First League in 1993–1998, 2001–2004, 2012 to 2013–14, 2016–17 and from 2019–to present. Neftekhimik has won 5 Second Division titles.

It has been a farm club of FC Rubin Kazan since 2007.

== Current squad ==
As of 11 September 2026, according to the official First League website.

Note: Flags indicate national team as defined under FIFA eligibility rules; some limited exceptions apply. Players may hold more than one non-FIFA nationality.

No.	Pos.	Nation	Player
1	GK	RUS	Andrei Golubev
2	DF	RUS	Marat Sitdikov
5	DF	RUS	Magomed Musalov
6	DF	RUS	Nikita Pechyonkin
7	MF	RUS	Sultan Dzhamilov
8	MF	RUS	Danila Sukhomlinov
9	FW	RUS	Artyom Kotik
11	MF	RUS	Surkhaykhan Abdullayev
12	MF	RUS	Enri Mukba (on loan from Rubin Kazan)
13	DF	RUS	Stanislav Puzanov
14	FW	RUS	Islam Mashukov
15	MF	RUS	Andrey Bondar (on loan from Rostov)
17	FW	RUS	Kirill Nikishin (on loan from Baltika Kaliningrad)
19	MF	RUS	Linar Sharifullin

No.	Pos.	Nation	Player
22	DF	RUS	Ivan Khomukha
24	DF	RUS	Aleksandr Kakhidze
27	MF	RUS	Arseny Budylin
28	DF	RUS	Platon Platonov
31	MF	RUS	Timur Kasimov
35	GK	RUS	Bulat Baykhuzin
38	MF	RUS	Vasili Aleynikov
44	DF	RUS	Mikhail Sukhoruchenko
58	MF	RUS	Samir Gazizov
85	MF	RUS	Ivan Pyatkin
96	MF	RUS	Nikita Vasilyev (on loan from Rubin Kazan)
98	GK	RUS	Artyom Ismagilov
99	MF	RUS	Adel Teshkin (on loan from Rubin Kazan)

=== Out on loan ===
Note: Flags indicate national team as defined under FIFA eligibility rules; some limited exceptions apply. Players may hold more than one non-FIFA nationality.

No.	Pos.	Nation	Player
—	DF	RUS	Matvey Filipovsky (at Nart Cherkessk until 31 December 2026)

== Notable players ==
Had international caps for their respective countries. Players whose name is listed in bold represented their countries while playing for Neftekhimik .

Russia/USSR

- (Russia) Valeri Chizhov
- (Russia) Vladislav Ignatyev
- (Russia) Ruslan Kambolov
- (Russia) Lyubomir Kantonistov
- (Russia) Daler Kuzyayev
- (Russia) Maksim Petrov
- (Russia) Igor Portnyagin
- (Russia) Yegor Sorokin
- (Russia) Aleksandr Yushin
- (Soviet Union) Vasili Zhupikov

Former USSR countries

- (Armenia) Stanislav Buchnev
- (Azerbaijan) Rizvan Umarov
- (Belarus) Pavel Kirylchyk
- (Belarus) **Artur Krivonos**
- (Belarus) Alyaksandr Oreshnikow
- (Georgia (country)) Giorgi Janelidze
- (Georgia (country)) Mamuka Kobakhidze
- (Georgia (country)) Solomon Kvirkvelia
- (Georgia (country)) Giorgi Megreladze
- (Georgia (country)) Vaso Sepashvili
- (Kazakhstan) Maksim Shevchenko
- (Latvia) Jurijs Hudjakovs
- (Latvia) Konstantīns Igošins
- (Latvia) **Vladimirs Kamešs**
- (Latvia) Aleksejs Šarando
- (Latvia) Sergejs Tarasovs
- (Latvia) **Vitālijs Teplovs**
- (Tajikistan) **Umed Alidodov**
- (Tajikistan) Iskandar Dzhalilov
- (Tajikistan) **Manuchekhr Dzhalilov**
- (Tajikistan) Parvizdzhon Umarbayev
- (Tajikistan) **Farkhod Vosiyev**
- (Turkmenistan) **Pavel Kharchik**
- (Turkmenistan) Wahyt Orazsähedow
- (Uzbekistan) Ulugbek Bakayev
- (Uzbekistan) Bobir Davlatov
- (Uzbekistan) **Vagiz Galiulin**
- (Uzbekistan) Aleksey Polyakov

South and Central America

- (Ecuador) Walter Chalá
