= Konstantīns Igošins =

Latvian footballer

Personal information
- Date of birth: 22 September 1971 (age 55)
- Height: 1.94 m (6 ft 4 1/2 in)
- Position: Goalkeeper

Youth career
- SC EShVSM Moscow

Senior career*
Years	Team	Apps	(Gls)
1988–1989	FC Lokomotiv Moscow	0	(0)
1991–1994	RAF Jelgava	78	(0)
1995	FC Shinnik Yaroslavl	5	(0)
1996–1998	FC Irtysh Omsk	102	(0)
1999–2000	FC Metallurg Krasnoyarsk	22	(0)
2001–2002	FC Irtysh Omsk	45	(0)
2003	FC Neftekhimik Nizhnekamsk	16	(0)
2003	FC Metallurg Krasnoyarsk	10	(0)
2004	FC Metallurg-Kuzbass Novokuznetsk	34	(0)
2005	FC Amur Blagoveshchensk	32	(0)
2006	FC Lada Togliatti	6	(0)
2006	FC Chkalovets Novosibirsk	18	(0)
2009	FC Metallurg Krasnoyarsk	0	(0)

International career
1992–1993	Latvia	3	(0)

Managerial career
- 2010–2016: FC Yenisey Krasnoyarsk (GK coach)
- * Club domestic league appearances and goals

Konstantīns Igošins (born 22 September 1971) is a retired Latvian professional footballer.

== Career ==
He made his professional debut in the Soviet Second League in 1990 for FK Daugava Rīga.

He played for FC Lokomotiv Moscow in the USSR Federation Cup.
