= Vladas Tučkus =

Soviet Lithuanian footballer

Vladas Tučkus (November 21, 1932 – November 19, 1988) was a Soviet Lithuanian football goalkeeper who played for Spartak Vilnius, Spartak Moscow and FK Daugava Rīga.

== Playing biography ==
Aged just 17 Tučkus won the Lithuanian Cup with Eļņias Šiauliai, a year later he won the 3rd place in the USSR youth championship and after just one more year he already played 20 matches for Spartak Vilnius in the Soviet B league. In 1953 with Tučkus in goal Spartak earned a promotion to Soviet Top League.

In 1954 Tučkus joined one of the strongest teams in Soviet football - Spartak Moscow and in the first season with Spartak won silver medals. The same result (with Tučkus playing approximately half of matches) was repeated in 1955. In 1956 Spartak and Tučkus won Soviet gold, in that season Tučkus was the undisputed number one goalkeeper in Spartak (he played in 20 matches out of total 22), he was also a candidate for the USSR national football team. 1957 was his last season with Spartak - he played in only 10 matches and Spartak finished third in the championship.

Because of problems with discipline off the field Tučkus' career seemed finished and by 1960 he was living in Brocēni, Latvia without a job and a perspective. But then he was offered to return to football and to play for FK Daugava Rīga which in 1960 because of a decision from above had got a place in the Soviet top league. Tučkus returned to training and soon proved that he still was a very good goalkeeper and it was largely his contribution that allowed Daugava to finish in the middle of the table in 1960. However, because of problems with discipline Tučkus had to leave Daugava in 1961. He continued playing on amateur level for Kompresors Rīga for some years.

Tučkus died at the age of 55 in Riga, Latvia.

== Achievements ==
- Soviet Top League
  - Winner: 1 (1956)
  - Runner-up: 2 (1954, 1955)
  - 3rd position: 1 (1957)
- Soviet First League
  - Runner-up: 1 (1952)
- Soviet Cup
  - Runner-up: 1 (1957)
