= Jurijs Hudjakovs =

Latvian footballer

Personal information
- Date of birth: 16 February 1969 (age 57)
- Height: 1.92 m (6 ft 4 in)
- Position: Forward

Senior career*
Years	Team	Apps	(Gls)
1991–1992	Kompar-Daugava		
1993	Metalurh Zaporizhya	1	(0)
1994	Gällivare		
1995–1996	Neftekhimik Nizhnekamsk	47	(5)
1996–1997	Zagłębie Lubin	4	(0)
1997	Ventspils	21	(4)
1998–2000	Kaskö		

International career
1992	Latvia	1	(0)
- * Club domestic league appearances and goals

Jurijs Hudjakovs (born 16 February 1969) is a Latvian former professional footballer who played as a forward.
