= Gunārs Ulmanis =

Latvian footballer

Gunārs Ulmanis (1938 – 17 July 2010) was a Latvian football right wing midfielder, one of the most famous Latvian footballers of the 1960s.

== Biography ==
While at school Ulmanis played both basketball and football but the famous Latvian football coach Vadims Ulbergs persuaded him to devote himself entirely to football.

For his first team in the regional competition Ulmanis scored 60 out of the team's 78 goals and was called up to the flagship of Latvian football - Daugava Rīga. In his first game for Daugava - an international game against Polish GKS Katowice - Ulmanis scored 3 goals.

He was popular among Latvian football fans for his "lazy" and relaxed playing manner which he was able to alter with unexpected outbursts of energy in form of shots on goal or passes to the center. His popularity was partly also connected with his last name Ulmanis (the same as former Latvian president Kārlis Ulmanis) which also brought him troubles with the Soviet authorities.

He played for Daugava for almost his entire career - from 1955 until 1969, scoring many important goals and having been elected the team captain.

After he was suspended from Daugava in 1969 after Soviet customs officers found an excess of cash he was carrying on his way to a friendly in the East Germany, he spent years as player-manager for Rīgas radiorūpnīca ("Radiotehniķis") until 1982. Until the late 1980s, Ulmanis was a milling-machine operator, before starting a career in coaching, as he was a coach in FK Pārdaugava 1991–1995) and the Riga Football School academy since 1996. He died on 17 July 2010 at the age of 71.
