= Aivars Pozņaks =

Latvian footballer

Personal information
- Date of birth: 2 February 1968 (age 58)
- Position: Forward

Senior career*
Years	Team	Apps	(Gls)
1992	Vairogs Rēzekne		
1993	RAF Jelgava		
1994–1995	Vairogs Rēzekne		
1997	Universitāte Rīga		
1998–1999	FK Rēzekne		
- FK Ditton Daugavpils

International career
1995	Latvia	1	(0)
- * Club domestic league appearances and goals

Aivars Pozņaks (born 2 February 1968) is a retired Latvian football striker.
