= Vladimirs Draguns =

Latvian footballer

Personal information
- Date of birth: 13 December 1972 (age 53)
- Position: Midfielder

Senior career*
Years	Team	Apps	(Gls)
1992	Pārdaugava		
1993–1994	Skonto RIga		
1995–1996	Amstrig / Universitāte Rīga		
1997–2001	Liepājas Metalurgs		
2002	Auda		
2002–2003	Artmedia Petržalka		

International career
1998	Latvia	3	(0)
- * Club domestic league appearances and goals

Vladimirs Draguns (born 13 December 1972) is a retired Latvian football midfielder.
