= Igors Stepanovs (footballer, born 1966) =

Latvian footballer

Igors V. Stepanovs
Personal information
- Full name: Igors Vladimirovich Stepanovs
- Date of birth: 1 February 1966 (age 60)
- Place of birth: Latvian SSR, USSR (now Republic of Latvia)
- Height: 1.73 m (5 ft 8 in)
- Position: Midfielder

Senior career*
Years	Team	Apps	(Gls)
1985–1986	Zveynieks Liepāja	55	(8)
1987–1990	Daugava Riga	131	(10)
1990	Olimpija Liepāja	4	(0)
1991	Daugava Riga	34	(0)
1992–1995	Skonto Riga	65	(13)
1995	Amstrig Riga		
1996	Daugava Riga		
1997–2002	FK Ventspils	97	(4)

International career^{‡}
1992–2002	Latvia	12	(0)
- * Club domestic league appearances and goals as of 2012-14-13 ‡ National team caps and goals as of 13 April 2012

Igors Vladimirovich Stepanovs (born 1 February 1966 in Latvian SSR) is a former Latvian football midfielder. Having played at club and international level with Igors Stepanovs, he was often referred as Igors V. Stepanovs.

== Honours ==
=== Club ===
Skonto

- Latvian Champion (2):

- 1992, 1995
