= Ēriks Grigjans =

Latvian footballer

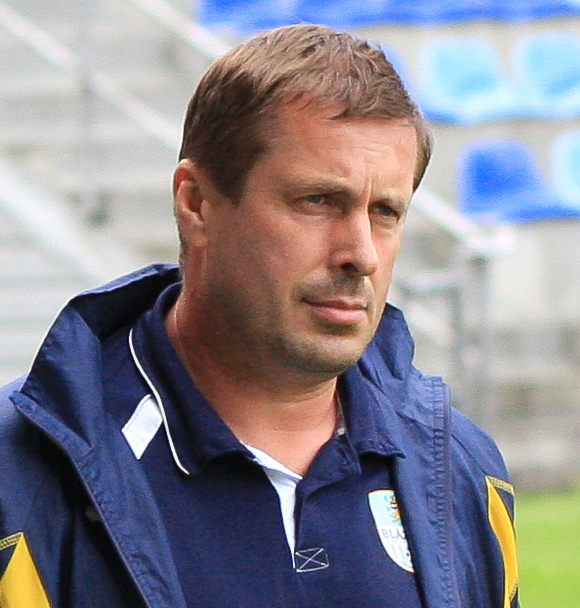
- Ēriks Grigjans, Latvian football goalkeeper and manager

Personal information
- Date of birth: 25 December 1964 (age 61)
- Position: Goalkeeper

Senior career*
| Years | Team | Apps | (Gls) |
| 1988–1989 | Zvejnieks Liepāja | | |
| 1992–1994 | Olimpija Rīga | | |
| 1995 | DAG Liepāja | | |
| 1996–1997 | Lokomotiv Daugavpils | | |
| 1998 | FK Valmiera | | |
| 1999–2001 | FK Rīga | | |
| 2002 | FK Ditton | | |

International career
| 1992, 1996 | Latvia | 3 | (0) |

Managerial career
- 2003–2004: FK Ditton
- 2005–2006: FK Rīga
- 2010–?: SK Blāzma (managerial list may be incomplete)
- * Club domestic league appearances and goals

Ēriks Grigjans (born 25 December 1964) is a retired Latvian football goalkeeper.
