= Aleksandrs Dibrivnijs =

Latvian footballer

Personal information
- Date of birth: 28 August 1969
- Place of birth: Jēkabpils, Latvian SSR
- Position: Forward

Senior career*
Years	Team	Apps	(Gls)
1987–1989	VEF Rīga		
1989	Junioru izlase		
1990	Pārdaugava Rīga		
1991–1994	Skonto FC	41	(5)
1994	Pārdaugava Rīga	1	
1994–1995	Olimpija Rīga	36	(6)
1996	Skonto/Metāls	25	(1)
1997	Daugava Rīga	10	(1)

International career
1993	Latvia	1	(0)
- * Club domestic league appearances and goals

Aleksandrs Dibrivnijs (born 28 August 1969 in Jēkabpils) is a former Latvia international footballer, a four-time champion of Latvia.

In his very first senior season in 1987 Dibrivnijs won the Latvian Cup with VEF Rīga. In the cup final against Torpedo Rīga Dibrivnijs came on as a substitute and scored the winning penalty in the shoot-out. Dibrivnijs spent two years with VEF but in 1988–1989 he had to start his military service in the Soviet Army. During the first months in the army Dibrivnijs still was allowed to play football with VEF, then he was assigned to play with RAF Jelgava, however as he didn't make the first-squad selection of RAF, he mostly played with Junioru izlase. After Dibrivnijs had expressed an interest in joining FC Baltika Kaliningrad, Dibrivnijs was sent to continue his service far from Latvia – in Irkutsk. There he played football with the local army squad and attracted interest from the management of FC Zvezda Irkutsk. He participated in some trainings with the club but wasn't allowed to play for it.

After completing his military service and returning to Riga Dibrivnijs received transfer papers for joining Zvezda Irkutsk, but he stayed in Riga and joined Pārdaugava Riga which was then coached by Jānis Gilis. In 1991 Dibrivnijs joined Skonto Riga for which he played until the summer of 1994, winning the Latvian Higher League all these four years. In 1993 Dibrivnijs played his single official match for Latvia national football team as it beat Estonia national football team to win the Baltic Cup.

In the middle of the 1994 season Dibrivnijs left Skonto, as after an injury he got very little playing practice. He joined Olimpija Rīga which had won the silver medals of the Latvian league the previous year but was already on a decline in 1994 and in 1995 finished in the 9th place in the Latvian League and went bankrupt. After that Dibrivnijs spent one year Skonto/Metāls. In his last season in the Latvian Higher League in 1997 Dibrivnijs played with Daugava Rīga which under the management of Jurijs Popkovs won the silver medals of Virslīga.

After leaving FC Daugava Dibrivnijs continued playing football with several Latvian First League clubs, however his preferences switched to futsal in which he also represented the Latvia national team, and in later years also took up coaching. As of October 2008 he is the playing head coach of the strongest Latvian futsal club – Nikars Rīga.

== Honours ==
- Baltic Cup (1):
  - 1993
- Latvian Champion (4):
  - 1991, 1992, 1993, 1994
- Latvian Cup (2):
  - 1987 (VEF), 1992 (Skonto)
