= Vjačeslavs Ževnerovičs =

Latvian footballer

Personal information
- Full name: Vjačeslavs Ževnerovičs
- Date of birth: 18 August 1967 (age 59)
- Place of birth: Soviet Union
- Height: 1.80 m (5 ft 11 in)
- Position: Striker

Senior career*
Years	Team	Apps	(Gls)
1995–1996	TPV Tampere		
1996–1997	Dinaburg FC		
1997–1999	FK Valmiera		

International career
1992	Latvia	1	(0)
- * Club domestic league appearances and goals

Vjačeslavs Ževnerovičs (born 18 August 1967) is a retired football striker from Latvia. He twice became top scorer of the highest league in Latvia, the Virsliga: in 1991 and 1992. He obtained one cap for the Latvia national football team, playing Lithuania on 12 July 1992 at the Baltic Cup 1992 in Liepāja.

== Honours ==
- Virsliga Top Scorer (2):

- 1991, 1992
