= Sergejs Tarasovs =

Latvian footballer

Personal information
- Date of birth: 16 January 1971 (age 55)
- Position: Midfielder

Senior career*
Years	Team	Apps	(Gls)
1991–1994	Skonto FC		
1994–1995	Tallinna JK		
1995–1997	Dinaburg FC		
1999	Policija Rīga		
1999	FC Neftekhimik Nizhnekamsk		

International career
1996	Latvia	2	(0)
- * Club domestic league appearances and goals

Sergejs Tarasovs (born 16 January 1971) is a retired Latvian football midfielder.
