= Raimonds Laizāns =

Latvian footballer

Raimonds Laizāns (born 5 August 1964) is a former Latvian football goalkeeper who played for the Latvia national football team in the 1990s.

== Club playing career ==
Raimonds Laizāns started playing football at the Daugava sports school in Riga at the age of 13. In 1980 with Progress Rīga he won the silver medals of the Latvian league and in 1983 debuted for the strongest Latvian club - Daugava Rīga. However his career with Daugava never really got off - Aleksandrs Kulakovs was in his prime years and the best Laizāns could hope for was being back-up to Kulakovs. From 1985 to 1987 Laizāns played with Zvejnieks Liepāja, then went to Ukraine - first to Volyn Lutsk with which he won the Ukrainian league in 1989, then - to FC Karpaty Lviv.

After the 1991/1992 season in Ukraine he returned to Latvia and joined Skonto FC. In the first year Laizāns played significantly less than Oļegs Grišins but from 1993 to 1996 he was the undisputed number one goalkeeper in the club which was without a doubt the strongest in Latvia. From 1994 to 1996 Laizāns was selected the best goalkeeper in Virslīga. In 1997 Laizāns started experiencing a competition from the club's second goalkeeper - Aleksandrs Koliņko (both played 12 matches in the Latvian Virslīga). And after that season Laizāns left Skonto for Fakel Voronezh in the 1st Russian league. The season was good for Laizāns - he played 39 of 42 matches with Fakel, but for the club it wasn't especially good - 10th place in the league. In 1999 Laizāns returned to Latvia again and joined Policijas FK. After one season with Policijas FK Laizāns retired from active football.

== National team playing career ==
In the early 1990s when Latvia regained independence and its national team debuted in international matches, there were two main contenders for the number one goalkeeper spot in Latvia - Laizāns and Oļegs Karavajevs. Laizāns got the honor of playing Latvia's first official game - against Romania on 8 April 1992. Karavajevs was the one who usually played the most important matches and who played for Latvia in its most historic matches but Laizāns usually got a chance to play in friendlies and in the Baltic Cup.

Laizāns' last match for Latvia came in 1998 as it lost 0:3 in a friendly game against Tunisia. In total he made 31 international appearances for Latvia.

After retiring from active football Laizāns took over the youth squad of Skonto FC, and as of January 2008 he is the chairman of JFK Olimps Rīga.

Raimonds Laizāns is not a relative of another former Daugava Rīga goalkeeper Laimonis Laizāns or of Latvia international footballer Juris Laizāns.

== Honours ==
- Champion of Latvia
  - 6 (1992–1997)
- Latvian Cup winner
  - 2 (1995, 1997)
- Best Goalkeeper in the Latvian League (3):

- 1994, 1995, 1996

- Champion of Ukraine
  - 1 (1989)
- Baltic Cup
  - 1 (1993)
