= Jānis Skredelis =

Latvian football coach (1939–2019)

Jānis Skredelis (29 December 1939 – 27 June 2019) was a Latvian football coach.

== Career ==
Skredelis managed Soviet First League side FC Daugava Riga during the 1980s.

Until 1 March 2021, the Arkādija Sports Complex in Riga was renamed Jānis Skredelis' Stadium to honor Skredelis.
