= Latvijas Universitātes stadions =

Stadium in Riga, Latvia

Coordinates: 56.961479°N 24.1436899°E

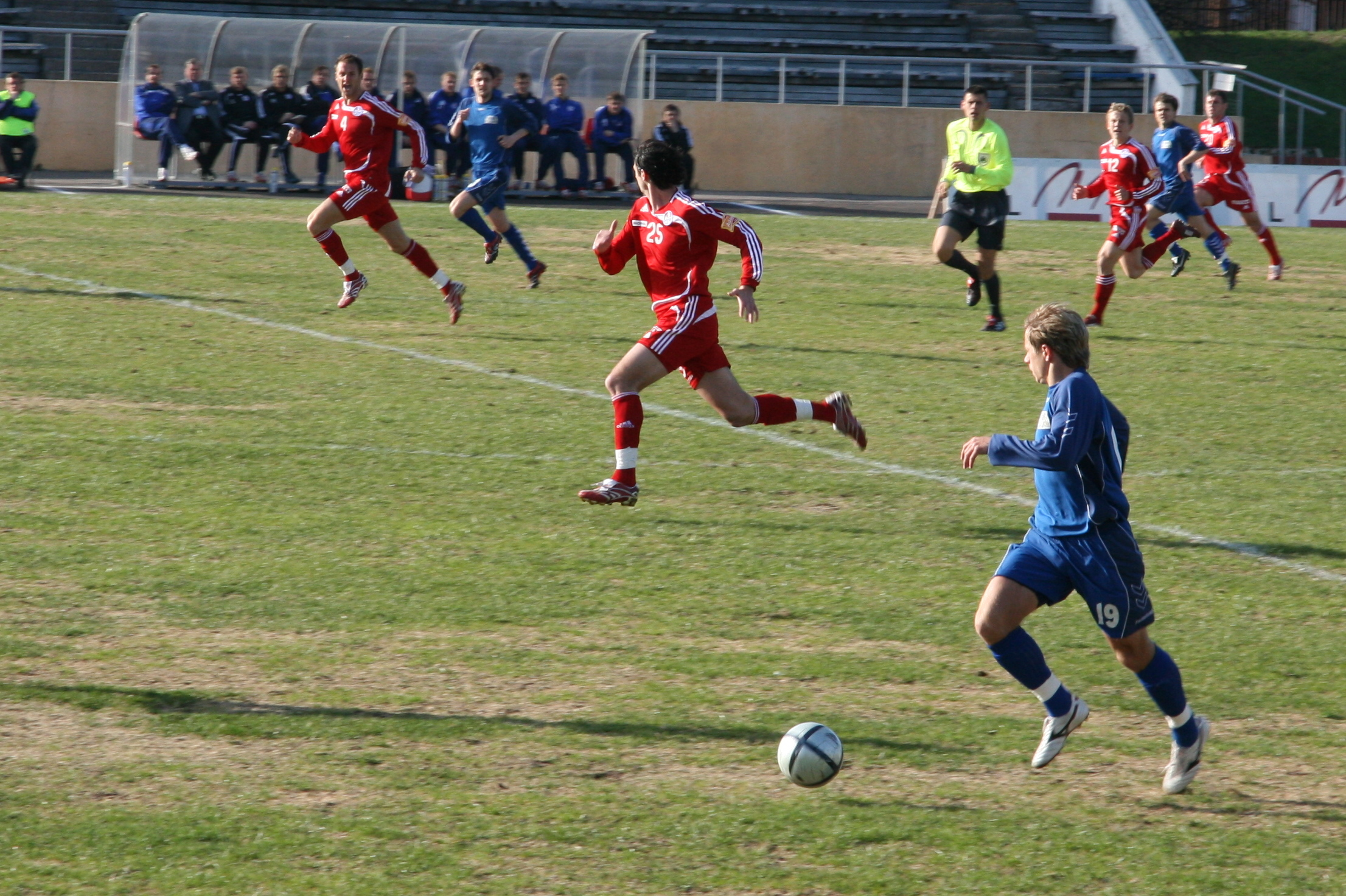
FK Rīga vs Skonto FC at the stadium in 2007

Latvijas Universitātes stadions was a multi-use stadium in Riga, Latvia that was owned by and named after the University of Latvia. It was used mostly for football and rugby matches and was the home stadium of FK Rīga. The stadium had a capacity of 5,000 spectators.

From its unveiling in 1923 until 1993, when it was given to the university, its name was ASK stadions (Armijas sporta kluba stadions, 'Army Sports Club Stadium') as it was established and operated by the Latvian Army Sports Club. In the 1920s, 1930s and 1990s the Latvia national football team played some of its home games here. The Latvia national rugby sevens team also occasionally played in the stadium in the 2010s.

During the Soviet occupation of Latvia and until the withdrawal of Russian army troops from Latvia in 1994, the stadium was managed by the Baltic Military District of the Soviet and Russian Army. In 2000, the university transferred ownership of the stadium to the Riga City Council. From 2012, when the stadium had been closed due to its poor condition, to 2016, the Latvian Football Federation worked on a project for a possible new stadium for the Latvian national team, but the planned 4,500 seat stadium was criticized as inadequate and ultimately abandoned. The stadium was ultimately demolished in March 2017 and replaced by the mixed-use public Centre Sports Quarter (Latvian: Centra sporta kvartāls) in September.
