= Einārs Gņedojs =

Latvian footballer (1965–2022)

Personal information
- Date of birth: 8 July 1965
- Date of death: 9 November 2022 (aged 57)
- Position: Defender

Senior career*
Years	Team	Apps	(Gls)
1985–1989	Zvejnieks Liepāja		
1991–1994	Skonto Rīga		
1995	Starts Brocēni		
1995	JK Tallinna Sadam		
1996	Skonto Rīga		
1997	Universitāte Rīga		

International career
1992–1994	Latvia	18	(0)
- * Club domestic league appearances and goals

Einars Gņedojs (8 July 1965 – 9 November 2022) was a Soviet and Latvian footballer who played as a defender.
