= Andrejs Štolcers =

Latvian footballer (born 1974)

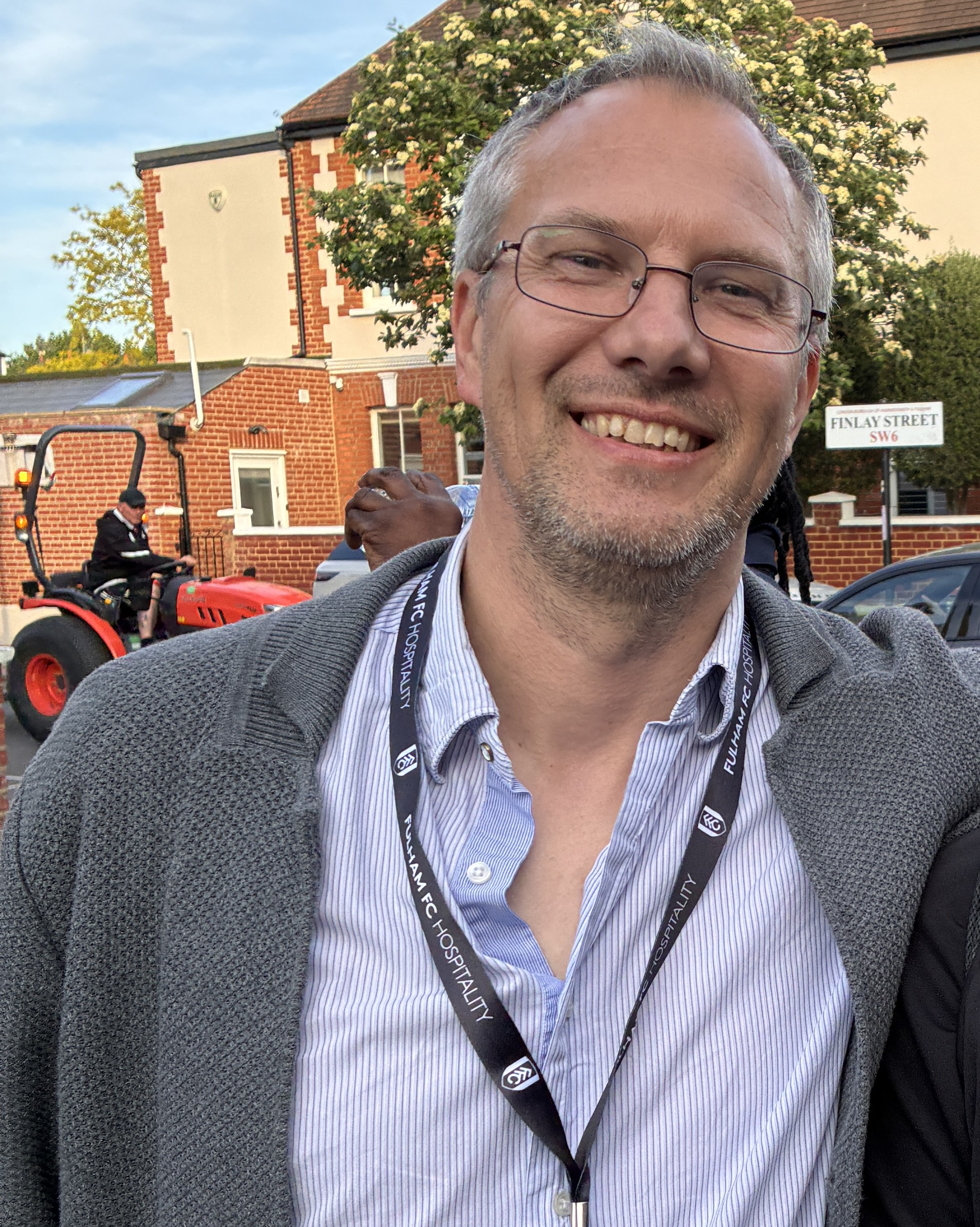
- Štolcers in 2026

Personal information
- Date of birth: 8 July 1974 (age 52)
- Place of birth: Riga, Latvian SSR, Soviet Union (now Latvia)
- Height: 1.78 m (5 ft 10 in)
- Position: Attacking midfielder

Youth career
- Olimpija Rīga

Senior career*
Years	Team	Apps	(Gls)
1992–1994	Olimpija Rīga	53	(22)
1996–1997	Skonto Riga	49	(15)
1997–2000	Shakhtar Donetsk	48	(14)
1998–2000	→ Shakhtar-2 Donetsk	17	(4)
2000	→ Spartak Moscow (loan)	12	(5)
2000–2004	Fulham	25	(2)
2004–2005	Yeovil Town	36	(5)
2005–2006	FK Baku	10	(4)
2006–2007	Skonto Riga	16	(3)
2007–2009	JFK Olimps Rīga	22	(5)
2009–2010	Bath City	8	(1)
2010	Hayes & Yeading United	9	(1)
Total		320	(86)

International career
1994–2005	Latvia	81	(7)

Managerial career
- 2009: JFK Olimps Rīga (playing coach)
- 2010–2019: Royal Russell School (youth team coach)
- 2016: Loures
- 2019: Eastern
- 2019–2020: Eastern (technical director)
- * Club domestic league appearances and goals

Andrejs Štolcers (born 8 July 1974) is a Latvian former professional footballer who played as an attacking midfielder.

== Club career ==
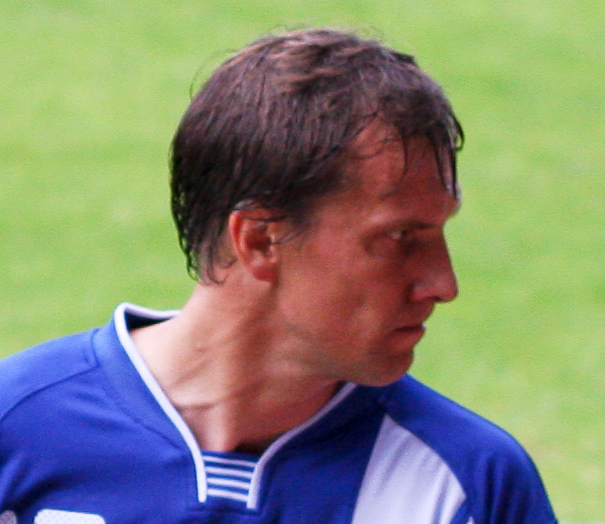
Štolcers in 2009

Born in Riga, Latvia, Štolcers started his career for Olimpija Rīga. He played there for two years from 1992 to 1994, making 53 league appearances and scoring 22 goals. In 1996, he was taken to Skonto Riga, where he showed his high scoring ability, scoring 15 goals in one season.

In 1997, he started his career abroad, joining the Ukrainian club Shakhtar Donetsk, where he spent three years, playing 48 matches and scoring 14 goals. In July 2000, he left and joined yet another big club – this time the Russian team Spartak Moscow. He quickly scored five goals in 12 games and in December of the same year was signed by the English club Fulham. Štolcers joined Fulham when they were still in the second tier of English football. However, Fulham's victorious 2000–01 Division One campaign in his first season at the club got them promoted to the Premier League, and Štolcers scored two goals in the process against West Bromwich Albion (on his debut) and Watford. These were his only two league goals for the club, and he failed to score in the Premier League, making just ten appearances over three full seasons at the top level. He did however score twice in a League Cup tie against Bury in November 2002. In 2004, he joined Yeovil Town, playing 36 league matches and scoring 7 goals in all competitions. In 2005, he left England and signed a contract in Azerbaijan with FK Baku. He only played ten games for them and scored four goals.

In 2006, he returned to his native Latvia, rejoining Skonto Riga. In the upcoming season he scored three goals in 16 matches for them and was released. In 2007, he joined JFK Olimps Rīga as the only experienced player in the team to help youngsters with their development. He played 22 matches and scored five goals from 2007 to 2009.

In 2009, he once again left Latvia, unsuccessfully trying to get into the Yeovil Town squad after being on trial, and later joining Bath City. He scored one goal in eight matches for them, and in 2010, Štolcers joined Hayes & Yeading United, where he retired from playing football with one goal in nine matches in his final season.

== International career ==
Štolcers's international debut for the Latvia national team came in a 0–0 draw against Denmark on 26 August 1992. He represented his country 81 times and scored seven goals. He played in the 2004 European Championships, held in Portugal.

== Managerial career ==
After being released from Hayes and Yeading United in May 2010, Štolcers started his coaching career. Štolcers took part in an international project called Concept4Football, helping youngsters who are not older than 16 years to develop their football abilities.

On 29 May 2011, Štolcers took part in the London Legends tournament held at Craven Cottage. In the semi-final match against Chelsea legends, he scored a goal from the penalty spot, but that did not save Fulham from losing 5–1.

In 2015, Štolcers was head coach for Stevenage FC, coaching U18s.

In 2016, Štolcers was appointed his first senior professional coaching role as head coach in Portugal for Loures.

Between 2016 and 2019 Štolcers was head coach of U14s and U16s in Fulham FC Foundation.

On 14 February 2019, Štolcers was appointed to his second senior professional coaching role as the head coach of Hong Kong Premier League club Eastern. He was also named the club's Technical Director. He left the club on 1 June 2020 after his contract expired.

== Career statistics ==
=== Club ===
Appearances and goals by club, season and competition
Club	Season	League			National Cup		League Cup		Continental		Other		Total	
Club	Season	Division	Apps	Goals	Apps	Goals	Apps	Goals	Apps	Goals	Apps	Goals	Apps	Goals
Shakhtar Donetsk	1997–98	Vyshcha Liha	13	4			–		–		–		13	4
Shakhtar Donetsk	1998–99	Vyshcha Liha	21	6			–		2	1	–		23	7
Shakhtar Donetsk	1999–2000	Vyshcha Liha	15	4			–		4	2	–		19	6
Shakhtar Donetsk	Total		49	14			0	0	6	3	0	0	55	17
Spartak Moscow	2000	Russian Top Division	12	5			–		3	0	–		12	5
Fulham	2000–01	First Division	15	2	1	0	1	0	–		–		17	2
Fulham	2001–02	Premier League	5	0	1	0	0	0	–		–		6	0
Fulham	2002–03	Premier League	5	0	0	0	2	0	2	0	–		9	0
Fulham	2003–04	Premier League	0	0	0	0	1	0	–		–		1	0
Fulham	Total		25	2	2	0	4	0	2	0	0	0	33	2
Yeovil Town	2004–05	League Two	36	4	5	1	1	0	–		1	1	43	6
Baku	2005–06	Azerbaijan Top League	10	4			–		2	1	–		12	5
Career total			132	29	7	1	5	0	13	4	1	0	158	34

=== International ===
Appearances and goals by national team and year
National team	Year	Apps	Goals
Latvia	1994	2	0
Latvia	1995	2	0
Latvia	1996	7	0
Latvia	1997	14	1
Latvia	1998	6	2
Latvia	1999	8	1
Latvia	2000	7	1
Latvia	2001	8	1
Latvia	2002	8	1
Latvia	2003	11	0
Latvia	2004	4	0
Latvia	2005	4	0
Total		81	7

Scores and results list Latvia's goal tally first, score column indicates score after each Štolcers goal.

List of international goals scored by Andrejs Štolcers
No.	Date	Venue	Opponent	Score	Result	Competition
1	25 June 1997	Daugava Stadium, Riga, Latvia	Andorra	1–0	4–1	Friendly
2	6 September 1998	Ullevaal Stadion, Oslo, Norway	Norway	2–1	3–1	UEFA Euro 2000 qualification
3	10 October 1998	Daugava Stadium, Riga, Latvia	Georgia	1–0	1–0	UEFA Euro 2000 qualification
4	4 September 1999	Qemal Stafa Stadium, Tirana, Albania	Albania	3–1	3–3	UEFA Euro 2000 qualification
5	4 February 2000	Pafiako Stadium, Paphos, Greece	Slovakia	1–3	1–3	2000 Cyprus International Tournament
6	24 March 2001	Stadion Gradski vrt, Osijek, Croatia	Croatia	1–3	1–4	2002 FIFA World Cup qualification
7	17 April 2002	Ventspils Olimpiskais Stadions, Ventspils, Riga	Kazakhstan	2–1	2–1	Friendly

== Honours ==
Skonto FC

- Virslīga: 1996

Fulham

- Football League First Division: 2000–01

Yeovil Town

- Football League Two: 2004–05

FC Baku

- Azerbaijan Top League: 2005–06

Individual

- Latvian League best midfielder: 1993
