= Aleksejs Semjonovs =

Latvian footballer

Personal information
- Full name: Aleksejs Semjonovs
- Date of birth: 2 April 1973 (age 53)
- Place of birth: Latvian SSR, Soviet Union
- Height: 1.70 m (5 ft 7 in)
- Position: Midfielder

International career^{‡}
Years	Team	Apps	(Gls)
1992–1994	Latvia	9	(2)
- ‡ National team caps and goals as of 23 May 2009

Aleksejs Semjonovs (born 2 April 1973) is a retired Latvian international football midfielder, who also holds the Russian nationality. He obtained a total number of nine caps for the Latvia national football team, scoring two goals. His last club was Dinaburg FC. He also played in Estonia and Russia during his career.
