= Dinaburg FC =

Latvian football club

- Founded: 1996
- Dissolved: 2009
- Ground: Daugava Stadium; Daugavpils, Latvia
- Capacity: 3,480
- League: Latvian First League
- 2009: 9th (relegated)
Home colours	Away colours

Dinaburg FC was a Latvian football club, playing in the city of Daugavpils. In 2009 it merged with FK Daugava. The club played at the Daugava Stadium (capacity 4,070). On October 5, 2009, Dinaburg was expelled from the Virsliga and both the president and trainer were banned for life on suspicion of betting and match-fixing.

== Historic names ==
- 1944 to 1950, 1971 to 1972 – Daugava
- 1952 to 1954 DzSK (SKZhD, Dzelzceļa sporta klubs/Спортивный клуб железной дороги, Railway Sports Club)
- 1955 to 1956 – Daugavpils
- 1959 to 1963, 1970, 1987 to 1991 – Celtnieks (Stroitel)
- 1964 to 1967 – ZSK (Завод строительных конструкций, Building Constructions Factory)
- 1968 to 1969 – Lokomotīve
- 1973 to 1986 – Ķīmiķis (Khimik, 'Chemist')
- 1992 to 1993 – BJSS/Celtnieks
- 1994 – Auseklis
- 1995 – Vilan-D
- 1996 to 2009 – Dinaburg FC

== History ==
=== Soviet club (1944–1994) ===
Following the re-occupation of Baltic states after the World War II, a team was created in Daugavpils in 1944 under the name of FK Daugava. During the Soviet period it was mostly known under name of Celtnieks or Stroitel (Строитель in Russian, 'builder') and for a while as Ķīmiķis (Khimik, Химик, 'Chemist') after its sponsor - the Daugavpils Synthetic Fibre Mill (Latvian: Daugavpils ķīmiskās šķiedras rūpnīca).

=== 1990s ===
After the dissolution of the Soviet Union, the club became bankrupt and participated in competitions fielding its football academy, BJSS Daugavpils. In 1992-1994 the team briefly played as Auseklis Daugavpils before folding. A team under the name of Vilan-D was its successor throughout 1995.

In 1996, FC Dinaburg was founded as a successor to Auseklis and Vilan-D.

=== Season 2006 ===
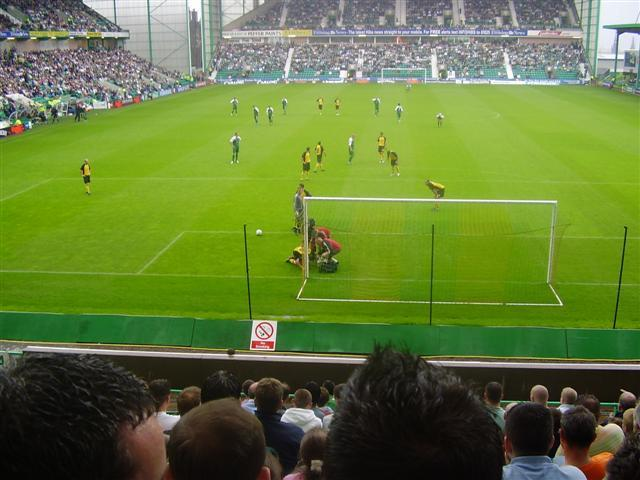
Hibernian v Dinaburg

They qualified to play with Hibernian, of Scotland, in the second round of the 2006 Intertoto Cup after beating Havnar Bóltfelag, from the Faroe Islands, 2–1 on aggregate in the first round. They lost 8–0 on aggregate, losing 5–0 in Edinburgh and 3–0 in Daugavpils.

=== Season 2007 ===
FC Dinaburg Daugavpils were eliminated from the Baltic League 2007 due to violation of Fair Play rules, but they once again qualified for the Intertoto Cup, where they started against Irish League team Cliftonville, but they lost 2–1 on aggregate, losing at home 1–0 after a 1–1 draw in Belfast.

=== Season 2009 ===
They qualified to play JK Nõmme Kalju from Estonian Meistriliiga, Estonia, in the first round of the UEFA Europa League. They won 2–1 in Daugavpils, and drew 0–0 in Tallinn. In the second round they played Bnei Yehuda Tel Aviv F.C. In Israel they lost 4–0 and 1–0 in Daugavpils. Later that season, they were relegated from both leagues they participated in (Virsliga and The Baltic Football League) because of suspicions of match fixing and illegal betting.

FK Daugava Daugavpils took their place in Virsliga 2010, with all the players who had previously played for Dinaburg in their squad, except the ones who had joined new clubs during the transfer season.

== Honours ==
- Latvian Cup
  - Winners (1): 1991
- Virslīga
  - Runners-up (1): 1995
- Latvian Cup
  - Runners-up (1): 2001

== Participation in Latvian Championships ==
- 2009 – 9th (relegated)
- 2008 – 4th
- 2007 – 7th
- 2006 – 4th
- 2005 – 4th
- 2004 – 4th
- 2003 – 4th
- 2002 – 4th
- 2001 – 4th
- 2000 – 4th
- 1999 – 4th
- 1998 – 4th
- 1997 – 3rd
- 1996 – 3rd
- 1995 – 2nd
- 1994 – 9th
- 1993 – 5th
- 1992 – 7th
- 1991 – 4th

== European record ==
=== Matches ===
All results (home and away) list Dinaburg's goal tally first.

Season	Competition	Round	Club	Home	Away	Aggregate
1996–97	UEFA Cup	Preliminary round	(Wales) Barry Town	1–2	0–0	1–2
1997–98	UEFA Cup Winners' Cup	Qualifying round	(Azerbaijan) Kapaz	1–0	1–0	2–0
1997–98	UEFA Cup Winners' Cup	First round	(Greece) AEK Athens	2–4	0–5	2–9
1998–99	UEFA Intertoto Cup	First round	(Slovakia) Trenčin	1–1	1–4	2–5
2000–01	UEFA Intertoto Cup	First round	(Slovakia) Trenčin	1–0	3–0	4–0
2000–01	UEFA Intertoto Cup	Second round	(Denmark) AaB	0–0	0–1	0–1
2001–02	UEFA Cup	Qualifying round	(Croatia) Osijek	2–1	0–1	2–2 (a)
2002–03	UEFA Intertoto Cup	First round	(Poland) Zagłębie Lubin	1–0	1–1	2–1
2002–03	UEFA Intertoto Cup	Second round	(Russia) Krylia Sovetov	0–1	0–3	0–4
2003–04	UEFA Intertoto Cup	First round	(Switzerland) Wil	1–0	0–2	1–2
2004–05	UEFA Intertoto Cup	First round	(Wales) Aberystwyth Town	4–0	0–0	4–0
2004–05	UEFA Intertoto Cup	Second round	(Serbia and Montenegro) OFK Beograd	0–2	1–3	1–5
2005–06	UEFA Intertoto Cup	First round	(Wales) Bangor City	2–0	2–1	4–1
2005–06	UEFA Intertoto Cup	Second round	(Lithuania) Žalgiris	2–1	0–2	2–3
2006–07	UEFA Intertoto Cup	First round	(Faroe Islands) Havnar Bóltfelag	1–1	1–0	2–1
2006–07	UEFA Intertoto Cup	Second round	(Scotland) Hibernian	0–3	0–5	0–8
2007–08	UEFA Intertoto Cup	First round	(Northern Ireland) Cliftonville	0–1	1–1	1–2
2009–10	UEFA Europa League	First qualifying round	(Estonia) Nõmme Kalju	2–1	0–0	2–1
2009–10	UEFA Europa League	Second qualifying round	(Israel) Bnei Yehuda	0–1	0–4	0–5

== Baltic League ==
Baltic League 2009–10

- First round
  - (Lithuania) FK Vėtra
  - 1st leg:0–0
  - 1st leg:0–3
