= Aleksandrs Jeļisejevs =

Latvian footballer

Aleksandrs Jelisejevs
Personal information
- Date of birth: 11 August 1971 (age 55)
- Place of birth: Daugavpils, Latvian SSR, Soviet Union
- Height: 1.82 m (5 ft 11 1/2 in)
- Position: Striker

Team information
- Current team: Latvia U-16 (manager)

Senior career*
Years	Team	Apps	(Gls)
1991	Forums-Skonto Riga	26	(9)
1992–1995	Skonto Riga	86	(50)
1995–1996	Hapoel Beit She'an	5	(0)
1996	Stadler FC	8	(0)
1996	Skonto Riga	15	(10)
1997	Metallurg Lipetsk	30	(17)
1998	Uralan Elista	4	(0)
1999	Torpedo-Viktoria Nizhny Novgorod	21	(6)
2000	Arsenal Tula	37	(10)
2001–2003	Skonto Riga	39	(12)
2004	Chengdu Wuniu	2	(0)
2004	FC Hämeenlinna	9	(0)
2005	Olimps Rīga	10	(1)
2005	Strømsgodset IF	12	(1)
2005	→ Strømsgodset IF 2	5	(0)

International career
1992–2002	Latvia	37	(4)

Managerial career
- 2011–2012: Auda
- 2022–: Latvia U-16
- * Club domestic league appearances and goals

Aleksandrs Jelisejevs (born 11 August 1971) is a Latvian football coach and a former international striker. He is the manager of the Latvia national under-16 team. He obtained a total number of 37 caps for the Latvia national football team, scoring four goals. He also played in Finland, Hungary, Russia and Israel during his career.

== Career statistics ==
=== International ===
Appearances and goals by national team and year
National team	Year	Apps	Goals
Latvia	1992	5	0
Latvia	1993	5	0
Latvia	1994	4	0
Latvia	1995	7	1
Latvia	1996	3	1
Latvia	1997	8	2
Latvia	1998	1	0
Latvia	1999	–	
Latvia	2000	1	1
Latvia	2001	2	0
Latvia	2002	1	0
Total		37	4

Scores and results list Latvia's goal tally first, score column indicates score after each Jeļisejevs goal.

List of international goals scored by Aleksandrs Jeļisejevs
No.	Date	Venue	Opponent	Score	Result	Competition
1	8 July 1998	Narva Kreenholm Stadium, Narva, Estonia	Lithuania	1–1	1–2	1996 Baltic Cup
2	15 February 1997	Anagennisi Football Ground, Deryneia, Cyprus	Lithuania	1–0	1–0	1997 Cyprus International Football Tournament
3	18 May 1997	Kadriorg Stadium, Tallinn, Estonia	Estonia	2–1	3–1	1998 FIFA World Cup qualification
4	15 November 2000	Stadio Olimpico, Serravalle, San Marino	San Marino	1–0	1–0	2002 FIFA World Cup qualification

== Honours ==
National Team

- Baltic Cup
  - 1993

Skonto FC

- Latvian Champion (1):
  - 1992
- Virsliga Top Scorer (1):
  - 1993
- Best Forward in the Latvian League (1):
  - 1993
