= FC Daugava Riga =

Latvian football club

FC Daugava Riga (FK Daugava Rīga) was a Soviet and Latvian football club from Riga. It participated in the Soviet championships. Through the years, the club represented various Riga factories like the VEF, RVR and the Riga Electrical Machine Building Works (AS RER).

== Name ==
- 1946–47 Daugava
- 1948–49 Daugava-VEF (Russian: Даугава-ВЭФ)
- 1950–58 Daugava
- 1959–62 Daugava-RVR (Даугава-РВЗ, Daugava-RVZ)
- 1963–69 Daugava-RER(Даугава-РЭЗ, Daugava-REZ)
- 1970–90 Daugava

== History ==
The club was founded in 1944 after the return of the Soviet occupation of Latvia. It made its debut in the Latvian SSR championship in 1946 by finishing 5th among 8 teams. In 1948, Daugava joined FC Dinamo Rīga (Rīgas "Dinamo", existed 1940–1960) as the second team from Latvia to play in the Soviet First League. For the 1949 season, thanks to changes in the tournament system, Daugava was promoted to the Soviet Top League where it managed to remain for 4 seasons until being relegated in 1952.

The following years brought more and more disappointments for Daugava with the team failing to leave an impression among Class B squads. However, in 1960 the team once again had the opportunity to play against the top Soviet teams – thanks to another decision from above. The first season there was by far the best – the 12th position among 22 teams, including 2 wins against the eventual league winners – Torpedo Moscow. This season was one of the best for Georgijs Smirnovs, it also was one of the best for the Lithuanian goalkeeper Vladas Tučkus who had won the Soviet Championship in 1956 with Spartak Moscow but had trouble recapturing his previous form afterwards.

However the next 2 seasons in Class A were less successful and in 1962 Daugava was relegated back to Class B (although it was officially renamed to Class A Second Group, essentially it was the second league). In 1967 Daugava was very close to promotion to Class A – it finished second after Dynamo Kirovabad and a win with a four-goal difference in the last match would have put Daugava first, however a missed penalty from Gunārs Ulmanis and a rather bleak second half of the last match didn't let that happen.

The failure to get a promotion to the top division brought changes to the Daugava team with the results getting worse from year to year and in 1971 Daugava was relegated to the Second League (third division of Soviet football) where it joined another Latvian team – Zvejnieks Liepāja. Climbing back the first league proved to be a tough task – despite being close to the top every season only in 1975 Daugava managed to get a promotion. That season saw the emergence of Sergey Shavlo who later became a key player for Spartak Moscow. However, after just a year Daugava was back in the second division and remained there until 1981 when under the management of Jānis Skredelis it proved itself significantly stronger than the rest of the second division squads.

The first years back in the first division brought mixed results until in 1985 Daugava won the 1st division and was as close to returning to the top league as ever. But it wasn't enough – as the top division was shortened after the 1985 season Daugava had to participate in a playoff tournament where it finished last despite a draw and a win against CSKA Moscow. The next season Daugava was again close to promotion but lost several points because of the "draws limit" (no points were awarded for drawn games for teams which had reached the draws limit). Financial difficulties had Daugava relegated to the second division in 1989. In 1990 it got the promotion back to the first division, but was dissolved. In 1991 the team was replaced by FK Pārdaugava which that year finished last the first division. Since it was also the end for the Soviet Union, Pārdaugava joined the Latvian Virslīga. In 1995, with the bankruptcy of its sponsors Pārdaugava ceased to exist.

Another team under the name of Daugava Rīga appeared in 1996 but it can't be really considered a successor to the "original" Daugava team as it came to existence in the form of a name change to former Torpedo Rīga, but it also went bankrupt in 2000. Later the name of Daugava emerged again in its current status as a youth squad as it doesn't have the original Daugava logo and isn't an official successor to Pārdaugava either. In 2007 FC Ditton from Daugavpils changed its name to FK Daugava Daugavpils and took up the old Daugava logo, still it could be debated which of the new Daugava's should be considered the successor to the old one.

== Succession and Daugava bonanza ==
=== Pārdaugava ===
Pārdaugava was established in 1984 as Daugava-RVR (Daugava-RVZ in Russian), but in 1985–89 it represented the Latvian national under-21 football team under the names of Juniors' Team (Junioru izlase) and Youth Team (Jaunatnes izlase). In 1991 it replaced the bankrupt FC Daugava Riga and was promoted to the Soviet First League in its place. After fall of the Soviet Union, Pārdaugava for few seasons played in the Latvian Virslīga before becoming insolvent as well in 1995.

=== Daugava (Torpedo Riga) ===
In 1996 FC Torpedo Rīga, that was founded in 1957 as RTP (Latvian: Rīgas taksometru parks, 'Riga Taxi Park'), changed its name to Daugava. In 2001 it merged with Policijas FK as FKP/Daugava, but already in 2002 it became insolvent.

=== Daugava (Ditton Daugavpils) ===
In 2007 FC Ditton Daugavpils, that was founded in 2001, changed its name to Daugava continuing to represent city of Daugavpils. After joining forces with Dinaburg FC, they adopted FC Dinaburg as their name, before folding in 2015.

=== Daugava (FSK Daugava-90) ===
In 2008 FC Daugava-90 Riga, that was founded in 2005, changed its name to Daugava. In 2011 the club changed its name to FK Rīgas Futbola skola.

=== Daugava (Jūrmala) ===
In 2012 FC Jūrmala, that was founded in 2003, moved to Riga and changed its name to Daugava. They folded in 2015.

== See also ==
- Dinamo Riga – an ice hockey sister team
