= Igors Stepanovs (footballer, born 1976) =

Latvian footballer (born 1976)

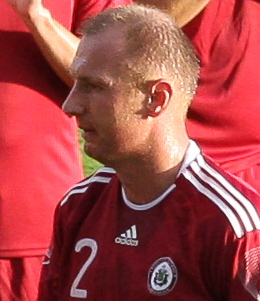
- Stepanovs playing for Latvia

Personal information
- Date of birth: 21 January 1976 (age 50)
- Place of birth: Ogre, Latvian SSR, Soviet Union
- Height: 1.92 m (6 ft 4 in)
- Position: Defender

Senior career*
Years	Team	Apps	(Gls)
1992–1993	Skonto Riga	9	(0)
1994	Interskonto	20	(2)
1995–2000	Skonto Riga	129	(11)
2000–2004	Arsenal	17	(0)
2003–2004	→ Beveren (loan)	21	(0)
2004–2006	Grasshoppers	50	(0)
2006	FK Jūrmala	9	(0)
2007–2008	Esbjerg fB	17	(1)
2008	FC Shinnik Yaroslavl	4	(0)
2009–2010	RFS/Olimps	7	(0)
2010–2011	FK Jūrmala	25	(1)
Total		306	(15)

International career
1995–2011	Latvia	100	(4)

Managerial career
- 2010–2011: FK Jūrmala (player/assistant coach)
- 2012–2018: Latvia U-17
- 2017–2018: Latvia U-18
- 2019: Auda
- 2020–2021: Maldives U-19
- * Club domestic league appearances and goals

Igors Stepanovs (born 21 January 1976) is a Latvian professional football coach and a former player who played as a defender. He was the manager of the Maldives under-19 national team in 2020–21. Stepanovs played 100 international matches and scored four goals for the Latvia national team. He made his debut in 1995, and played in Euro 2004.

== Club career ==
=== Skonto ===
Born in Ogre, Stepanovs started his club career at Skonto-Metāls (later Skonto Riga). He made his debut in senior football at just 16 years old and won seven national titles. In 1995, he made his debut for the Latvia national team and soon became a regular member of the side. While playing with Skonto, Stepanovs played against teams like Inter Milan, Barcelona, and Chelsea. In these games, Skonto and Stepanovs performed well. In 2000, he attracted interest from many European teams.

=== Arsenal ===
In 2000, Arsenal captain Tony Adams was injured, prompting Arsène Wenger to sign Stepanovs for a transfer fee of £1.35 million. He started the season well, scoring a goal for Arsenal in a 2–1 League Cup defeat to Ipswich Town on his debut. His playing time grew until a match against Manchester United, when both sides were battling for the Premier League title. Arsenal lost this game 6–1 and their chances of winning the title were hit. After this disappointing performance, Stepanovs played only once again that season in a game against Manchester City. He recovered to make six Premier League appearances the following season as Arsenal won the 2001–02 FA Premier League. Six would not normally be enough to earn a medal but he was an unused substitute on the day Arsenal clinched the title against Manchester United at Old Trafford, the scene of his lowest point the season before. Arsenal also won the FA Cup in 2002 and 2003 but Stepanovs was left out of both matchday squads. He contributed to their 2002 triumph when featuring in a game against Newcastle United during their run.

Overall, he played just 17 times in the league for Arsenal, all of them starts, and 31 times in all competitions.

=== Later years ===
After several years with Arsenal, Stepanovs moved to K.S.K. Beveren, which had a co-operation agreement with the English club. There he gained back some confidence and he was again in good shape. Stepanovs played well in the Latvia national team, helping it to qualify for Euro 2004 where he played in all of Latvia's three games.

After Euro 2004, Stepanovs joined Grasshopper Club Zürich. There he played for two seasons, but was released. In 2006, he returned to Latvia and played some games for FK Jūrmala. On 26 January 2007, he moved to Danish Premier League side Esbjerg fB on a free transfer, but after just a year he moved to the Russian FC Shinnik Yaroslavl. He was released by Shinnik on 9 July 2008 and in April 2009 he signed for Latvian side RFS/Olimps, but a year later re-joined his previous team FK Jūrmala. He played there for two seasons, making 25 league appearances, scoring a solitary goal. In August 2011, the player announced his retirement from professional football. On 10 August 2011, Stepanovs was called up to the Latvia national team for a friendly match against Finland. He played his 100th and last match for Latvia then, and was honoured during the match for his long-term commitment to the national squad.

== Coaching career ==
During his time at FK Jūrmala, Stepanovs worked as a player-coach assisting the club's manager Vladimirs Babičevs. In March 2012, Stepanovs was appointed as the manager of Latvia under-17 national team.

== Honours ==
Arsenal

- Premier League: 2001–02
- FA Cup: 2001–02, 2002–03

Individual

- Latvian Footballer of the Year: 2005

== See also ==
- List of men's footballers with 100 or more international caps
