= Imants Bleidelis =

Latvian footballer (born 1975)

Personal information
- Date of birth: 16 August 1975 (age 51)
- Place of birth: Riga, Latvian SSR, USSR (now Republic of Latvia)
- Height: 1.78 m (5 ft 10 in)
- Position: Midfielder

Senior career*
| Years | Team | Apps | (Gls) |
| 1992–1993 | Skonto | 1 | (0) |
| 1994 | Interskonto | 11 | (1) |
| 1994–1999 | Skonto | 118 | (24) |
| 1999–2002 | Southampton | 3 | (0) |
| 2002–2005 | Viborg | 57 | (6) |
| 2005–2006 | Grazer AK | 28 | (0) |
| 2006–2007 | Jūrmala | 26 | (7) |
| 2007–2008 | Liepājas Metalurgs | 22 | (1) |
| Total | | 266 | (39) |

International career
| 1995–2007 | Latvia | 106 | (10) |
- * Club domestic league appearances and goals

Imants Bleidelis (born 16 August 1975) is a Latvian former professional footballer who played as a midfielder. He made 106 appearances for the Latvia national team.

== Club career ==
Born in Riga, Latvian SSR, Soviet Union, Bleidelis started his career at Skonto in 1992. In 1994, he played for Inter Skonto, and then between 1994 and 1999 he played 128 games scoring 24 games for Skonto. Skonto then sold him to English club, Southampton who were then in the Premier League, for £650,000, where he joined fellow countryman Marians Pahars. Bleidelis signed a three-and-a-half-year contract. He played only three league games in three seasons, and after being allowed to go on trial in Denmark with Superliga club, Viborg January 2003 Southampton released him on 26 January, and two days later he signed a two-year contract with Viborg, where he scored six goals in 57 appearances.

He left Viborg in winter 2004 after turning down a new contract. Despite offers from two Latvian clubs, Skonto and Venta, in 2005, he moved to Austria to play for Austrian Bundesliga club Grazer AK, where he signed a two-year contract. He made his debut for the club on 17 February 2005 in the UEFA Cup against English club Middlesbrough.

He moved back to Latvia in 2006 with Jūrmala. In 2007, he moved to Liepājas Metalurgs. Bleidelis had his contract with Liepājas Metalurgs terminated on 7 July 2008, along with another Latvian international, Andrejs Rubins.

== International career ==
Bleidelis played over 100 international matches and scored ten goals for the Latvia national team. He made his debut on 19 May 1995 against Estonia in the Baltic Cup. He played at the Euro 2004 finals and his 100th appearance came on 2 June 2007 against Spain in UEFA European Championship qualifier.

== Career statistics ==
=== International ===
Appearances and goals by national team and year
| National team | Year | Apps | Goals |
|---|---|---|---|
| Latvia | 1995 | 6 | 0 |
| Latvia | 1996 | 5 | 0 |
| Latvia | 1997 | 13 | 2 |
| Latvia | 1998 | 9 | 2 |
| Latvia | 1999 | 7 | 1 |
| Latvia | 2000 | 7 | 0 |
| Latvia | 2001 | 9 | 0 |
| Latvia | 2002 | 8 | 0 |
| Latvia | 2003 | 10 | 3 |
| Latvia | 2004 | 12 | 0 |
| Latvia | 2005 | 8 | 2 |
| Latvia | 2006 | 4 | 0 |
| Latvia | 2007 | 8 | 0 |
| Total | | 106 | 10 |

Scores and results list Latvia's goal tally first, score column indicates score after each Bleidelis goal.

List of international goals scored by Imants Bleidelis
| No. | Date | Venue | Opponent | Score | Result | Competition | Ref. |
|---|---|---|---|---|---|---|---|
| 1 | 25 June 1997 | Daugava Stadium, Riga, Latvia | Andorra | 2–0 | 4–1 | Friendly | |
| 2 | 25 June 1997 | Daugava Stadium, Riga, Latvia | Andorra | 4–1 | 4–1 | Friendly | |
| 3 | 6 February 1998 | National Stadium, Ta' Qali, Malta | Georgia | 1–2 | 1–2 | Friendly | |
| 4 | 26 June 1998 | Pärnu Rannastaadion, Pärnu, Estonia | Andorra | 2–0 | 2–0 | Friendly | |
| 5 | 8 September 1999 | Boris Paichadze National Stadium, Tbilisi, Georgia | Georgia | 1–2 | 2–2 | UEFA Euro 2000 qualifying | |
| 6 | 30 April 2003 | Skonto Stadium, Riga, Latvia | San Marino | 2–0 | 3–0 | UEFA Euro 2004 qualifying | |
| 7 | 30 April 2003 | Skonto Stadium, Riga, Latvia | San Marino | 3–0 | 3–0 | UEFA Euro 2004 qualifying | |
| 8 | 10 September 2003 | Skonto Stadium, Riga, Latvia | Hungary | 2–0 | 3–1 | UEFA Euro 2004 qualifying | |
| 9 | 30 April 2005 | Skonto Stadium, Riga, Latvia | Luxembourg | 1–0 | 4–0 | 2006 FIFA World Cup qualification | |
| 10 | 8 June 2005 | Skonto Stadium, Riga, Latvia | Liechtenstein | 1–0 | 1–0 | 2006 FIFA World Cup qualification | |

== Honours ==
Skonto

- Virsliga: 1992, 1994, 1995, 1996, 1997, 1998, 1999
- Latvian Football Cup: 1995, 1997, 1998

Metalurgs

- Baltic League: 2007

== See also ==
- List of men's footballers with 100 or more international caps
