= Olimpija Rīga =

Former Latvian football club

- Full name: Olimpija Rīga
- Founded: 1992
- Dissolved: 1995
- Ground: Latvijas Universitātes Stadions, Riga
- Capacity: 5,000
- League: Latvian Higher League
- 1995: Latvian Higher League, 9th

Olimpija Rīga was a Latvian football club based in Riga that played in the Latvian Latvian Higher League from 1992 to 1995.

== History ==
The club was founded in 1992 as Kompar-Daugava, using the name of the former FK Daugava in addition to the sponsors name of the new club. In the club's first season at Virslīga, they finished in fifth place during its first season in Virslīga. Jurijs Hudjakovs was named the best goalscorer of the club, Dzintars Sproģis was named the best defender in the Latvian league. The same year, Kompar-Daugava also reached the Latvian Football Cup final, losing 1–0 in extra time in the final against Skonto FC.

In 1993, the club was renamed to Olimpija Rīga, after the Riga Olimpija bank, which financed the club. The new government brought serious money to the club which now had one of the best squads in Latvia. In 1993, Olimpija were runners-up, of Virslīga, finishing second behind Skonto FC. Goalkeeper Ēriks Grigjans and midfield Andrejs Štolcers were both nominated the best in the league in their respective positions.

For the 1994 season, Olimpija acquired Latvia national team goalkeeper Oļegs Karavajevs. The club finished in fourth place in the league, but won the Latvian Football Cup, after a 2–0 win against Dag Rīga. In 1995, most of its best players left the club as the bank that sponsored the club was on its way to bankruptcy. In the league, they finished in ninth place from ten teams and after the season, the club became defunct.

In its management over the few seasons of the clubs, existence worked several of the most noted football managers in Latvia including Jānis Skredelis, Aleksandrs Starkovs and Vladimirs Žuks.

== Honours ==
- Latvian Football Cup: 1
  - 1994

== European history ==
Season	Cup	Round	Country	Opponent	Result	Ref.
1994–95	Cup Winners' Cup	Qualifying round	Norway	Bodø/Glimt	0–6, 0–0	

== See also ==
- FK Pārdaugava
