= Oļegs Blagonadeždins =

Latvian footballer (born 1973)

Personal information
- Date of birth: 16 May 1973 (age 53)
- Place of birth: Riga, Latvian SSR, Soviet Union
- Height: 1.80 m (5 ft 11 in)
- Position: Defender

Senior career*
Years	Team	Apps	(Gls)
1991	Pārdaugava Rīga	1	(0)
1992–2006	Skonto Rīga	222	(19)
2003	Spartak-Alania Vladikavkaz (loan)	4	(0)
2006–2007	FK Jūrmala	23	(0)

International career
1993–2004	Latvia	70	(2)

Managerial career
- 2007–2009: JFC Skonto (youth)
- 2009–2012: Latvia U-19
- 2012: Spartaks Jūrmala
- 2014: AFA Olaine
- 2014: Spartaks Jūrmala (caretaker)
- 2019: SK Super Nova
- * Club domestic league appearances and goals

Oļegs Blagonadeždins (born 16 May 1973) is a Latvian former professional footballer who played as a defender.

== Career ==
During his playing career he played 70 international matches and scored two goals for the Latvia national team. He debuted in 1992 when the national team was founded, and played at the Euro 2004. He started his career in Pārdaugava, then played for Skonto FC for several years. Blagonadeždins also played for Spartak-Alania Vladikavkaz in Russia. His last club was FK Jūrmala.

From February to July 2012 Blagonadeždins managed the Latvian Higher League club Spartaks Jūrmala. Prior to the 2014 Latvian First League season Blagonadeždins was appointed as the manager of AFA Olaine. In mid-season he left, joining his previous club Spartaks Jūrmala to fulfill the role of the assistant manager. For a short period of time in June 2014 Blagonadeždins worked as the care-taker at the club, fulfilling the manager's functions from the dismissal of Fabio Micarelli till appointment of Roman Pylypchuk.

== Honours ==
Skonto Riga

- Baltic Cup: 1993, 2001
- Latvian champion (7): 1992, 1993, 1994, 1995, 1997, 1998, 1999
