= Vladimirs Babičevs =

Latvian footballer and manager

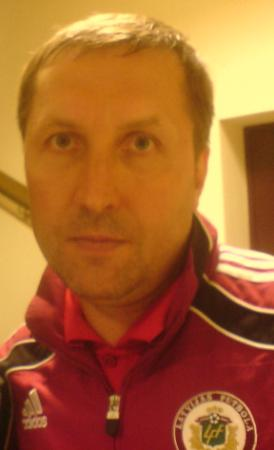

Personal information
- Full name: Vladimirs Babičevs
- Date of birth: 22 April 1968 (age 58)
- Place of birth: Riga, Latvian SSR, Soviet Union (now Republic of Latvia)
- Height: 1.78 m (5 ft 10 in)
- Position: Midfielder

Team information
- Current team: Latvia U-19 (manager)

Youth career
- 198?–1986: 9. maijs

Senior career*
Years	Team	Apps	(Gls)
1987	Zvejnieks Liepāja	2	(0)
1988–1992	RAF Jelgava	145	(21)
1993–1999	Skonto FC	130	(60)
2000	Policijas FK	10	(0)
2000	Torpedo-ZIL	0	(0)
2001–2002	FK Rīga	26	(8)
2003–2006	FK Jūrmala	42	(8)

International career
1993–1999	Latvia	51	(4)

Managerial career
- 2006: FK Jūrmala
- 2008: JFC Olimps (assistant)
- 2008–2011: FK Jūrmala-VV
- 2012–: Latvia U-19
- * Club domestic league appearances and goals

Vladimirs Babičevs (born 22 April 1968) is a Latvian football manager and a former footballer. Currently, he is the manager of the Latvia national under-19 football team.

Babičevs has played 51 matches for Latvia internationally.

== Club playing career ==
His first club was 9. maijs where he played under Juris Docenko. In 1987 Babičevs joined Zvejnieks Liepāja for which he played 2 matches in the second Soviet league. In 1988, he switched to RAF Jelgava. With RAF he played for four seasons in different divisions of Soviet football, and in 1992 – in Latvian Virslīga. In 1992 RAF played a golden match against Skonto FC and lost 2:3. After the season, Babičevs switched to the side of the victors – Skonto.

With Skonto came the most successful years of Vladimirs' career – the club was by far the strongest in Latvia and Babičevs soon became one of the key players for Skonto. In 1994, he was the best goalscorer in the Latvian league with 14 goals and was selected the best forward in the league. In the mid-1990s Babičevs' switched to midfield and in 1997 he was selected the best midfielder in the Latvian league. In 1997 Babičevs was the only Skonto player to score against FC Barcelona in the UEFA Champions League qualifiers.

In 1999, Babičevs got to play rather little – both because of competition and of his injuries. Before the 2000 season Babičevs together with several other Skonto players who the club didn't count with for the upcoming season left for Policijas FK. In the middle of the season, Babičevs joined the only foreign club of his career – Torpedo-ZIL in Russia but he didn't play in any matches for the club. In 2001 Babičevs joined FK Rīga. In 2003, he switched to another new club – FK Jūrmala.

== National team playing career ==
Babičevs made his national team debut on 2 June 1993 as Latvia lost 1:2 at home against Northern Ireland. On 15 November 1994 he scored his first goal for Latvia as in a rather poor match it beat Liechtenstein 1:0. In his international career Babičevs wasn't as much of a goalscorer as playing in different clubs – over 51 matches for Latvia he scored 4 goals. His last match for Latvia came in 1999 as it drew 2:2 away against Georgia.

== Coaching career ==
In the middle of the 2006 season, Babičevs was signed as head coach of FK Jūrmala but his contract wasn't renewed at the end of the season as the club failed to finish in the 4th place in the Latvian league. On 23 January 2008, it was announced that Babičevs, who after leaving FK Jūrmala was director of JFK Olimps, was appointed an assistant coach for the club. From 2008 to 2011 he was the manager of FK Jūrmala-VV once again. In September 2011 he left the club as the results were poor. In March 2012 Babičevs was appointed as the manager of Latvia national under-19 football team.

== Honours ==
National Team

- Baltic Cup

- 1993

Club Team

- Champion of Latvia (7):

- 1993–1999

- Latvian Cup Winner (3):

- 1995, 1997, 1998

Individual

- Best Forward in Latvian League (1):

- 1994

- Best Midfielder in Latvian League (1):

- 1997

- Virsliga Top Scorer (1):

- 1994
