= FK Pārdaugava =

Latvian football club

Pārdaugava
- Full name: Futbola klubs Pārdaugava
- Founded: 1984
- Dissolved: 1995
- Ground: Daugava Stadium, Riga, Latvia; Carnikava Stadium, Carnikava

FK Pārdaugava was a Latvian football club based in Riga. It was founded in 1984 as Daugava-RVR, the youth team of FK Daugava Riga and became defunct in 1995.

In 1991 it replaced FK Daugava and played in the Soviet First League. It completed the 1991 season in last place (22nd). After the fall of the Soviet Union, FK Pārdaugava for few seasons played in the Latvian Higher League. In 1995, with the bankruptcy of its sponsors, the club was dissolved after the 8th round of the Virslīga. Former Latvian football legend Gunārs Ulmanis was a coach in the team from 1991 to its dissolution.

== Name history ==
- 1984: Daugava-RVR
- 1985–1987: Junioru izlase ('Junior Selection')
- 1988–1989: Jaunatnes izlase ('Youth Selection')
- 1990–1991: Pārdaugava/RASMS (Republikas augstākās sporta meistarības skola, 'Republican School of Higher Sports Excellence)
- 1991: Pārdaugava/NSS (Nacionālā sporta skola, National Sports School)
- 1992–1995: FK Pārdaugava

== Honours ==
- Latvian Higher League

- Runners-up (1): 1991

- Latvian Cup

- Runners-up (1): 1993

== Notable players ==
- Marians Pahars
- Andrejs Piedels
- Dzintars Zirnis
- Oļegs Blagonadeždins

== See also ==
- Olimpija Rīga
