= Jurijs Andrejevs =

Latvian footballer (born 1957)

Personal information
- Date of birth: 16 January 1957 (age 69)
- Place of birth: Riga, Latvian SSR, USSR (now Republic of Latvia)

Team information
- Current team: Liepājas Metalurgs (sporting director)

Senior career*
Years	Team	Apps	(Gls)
1977–1978	FK Daugava Rīga		
1978–?	FK Jūrnieks		
- FK Progress
- Celtnieks Rīga
1985	FK Alfa		
- Enerģija Rīga

Managerial career
- FK Daugava Rīga
- FK Pārdaugava
- 2004–2005: Skonto FC
- 2004–2007: Latvia
- 2007–2008: FK Liepājas Metalurgs
- * Club domestic league appearances and goals

Jurijs Andrejevs (born 16 January 1957) is a Latvian former football player and manager who is the sporting director of Riga FC academy. Previously he was the manager of the team but was released in 2008 after an unsuccessful season. He was the manager of Latvia national team from 2004 to 2007, having succeeded Aleksandrs Starkovs in December 2004.

== Playing career ==
Born in Riga, Latvia, USSR, Andrejevs played for a number of football clubs in the city. He started his career with Daugava Rīga. He also played for FK Jūrnieks, Progress, Celtnieks Rīga, Alfa and Enerģija Rīga. He was champion with Soviet Latvia's football team FK Alfa in 1985.

== Managerial career ==
=== Club ===
Andrejevs has worked with FK Daugava Rīga and FK Pārdaugava. He was manager of Virslīga club Skonto from 2004 until 2005. He was assistant manager under then manager, Aleksandrs Starkovs and when he moved to Russia to manage Spartak Moscow in September 2004, Andrejevs was promoted to manager. On 11 November Skonto claimed the Virslīga title, for the 14th consecutive season, a world record.

After Skonto lost 6–0 to Macedonian club, Rabotnički, in the 2005 Champions League First qualifying round, he resigned from the post and was replaced by English manager, Paul Ashworth. After he was sacked as Latvia manager earlier in the year, he worked as Sporting Director at Liepājas Metalurgs and he was appointed manager in November 2007 following the resignation of Benjaminas Zelkevičius at the end of the 2007 Virslīga season, in which the club had finished second behind FK Ventspils. Andrejevs signed a two-year contract with the club and was released in 2008.

=== Latvia ===
Andrejevs has been Latvian national manager at various levels, including Under-16, Under-18 and Under-21.

He coached a number of famous Latvian players, when he was with the U-21 team, including Oļegs Blagonadeždins, Imants Bleidelis, Viktors Dobrecovs, Aleksandrs Isakovs, Ģirts Karlsons, Vladimirs Koļesņičenko, Aleksandrs Koliņko, Igors Korabļovs, Viktors Morozs, Marians Pahars, Andrejs Prohorenkovs, Andrejs Rubins, Genādijs Soloņicins, Igors Stepanovs, Māris Verpakovskis and Dzintars Zirnis.

He started working with the Latvia national team in 2001 as assistant to Aleksandrs Starkovs. He was assistant manager when Latvia qualified for and played in Euro 2004, held in Portugal. When Starkovs moved to Russia in 2004 with Spartak Moscow he also gave up his post as Latvia manager on 17 November and Andrejevs was promoted in his place by the Latvian Football Federation Latvia lost the first match with him in charge to Oman, 3–2, in Bahrain. However, Andrejevs had used the match to give fringe squad players a chance to play. Latvia won the King's Cup in Thailand in 2005. He resigned as Latvia manager following a 1–0 defeat on 28 March 2007 to Liechtenstein in a Euro 2008 qualifying match. It was only Liechtensteins second ever win in the competition

Some of the players who made their international debut when he was manager of the national team were – Deniss Romanovs, Antons Jemeļins, Aleksejs Višņakovs, Oskars Kļava, Kaspars Gorkšs, Deniss Kačanovs and Deniss Ivanovs.

== Honours ==
=== Player ===
FK Alfa

- Latvian league: 1985

=== Manager ===
Skonto

- Virslīga: 2004
- Latvian football Cup finalist: 2004
- Livonia Cup: 2004, 2005

Latvia

- King's Cup: 2005

Preceded by Benjaminas Zelkevičius	FHK Liepājas Metalurgs manager 2007–	Succeeded by Incumbent
