= 2001–02 Southampton F.C. season =

Southampton F.C.
2001–02 season
- Chairman: Rupert Lowe
- Manager: Stuart Gray (until 21 October 2001); Gordon Strachan (from 22 October 2001)
- Stadium: St Mary's Stadium
- FA Premier League: 11th
- FA Cup: Third round
- League Cup: Third round
- Top goalscorer: League: Marians Pahars (14); All: Marians Pahars (16)
- Highest home attendance: 31,973 v Newcastle United (11 May 2002)
- Lowest home attendance: 26,794 v Aston Villa (24 September 2001)
- Average home league attendance: 30,633
- Biggest win: 4–0 v Leicester City (8 December 2001)
- Biggest defeat: 1–6 v Manchester United (22 December 2001)
Home colours	Away colours	Third colours

The 2001–02 Southampton F.C. season was the club's 101st season of competitive football, their 32nd (and 24th consecutive) in the top flight of English football, and their tenth in the FA Premier League. Having achieved a top-half finish for the first time in six seasons, the Saints had a relatively consistent campaign in which they dropped only one place, finishing 11th in the league. The season was the club's first at their new home ground St Mary's Stadium after 103 years at The Dell, as well as their first with manager Gordon Strachan, who replaced Stuart Gray early in the season after seven months in charge.

Upon becoming the club's permanent manager in the summer, Gray made two high-profile signings in Swedish midfielder Anders Svensson and Irish midfielder Rory Delap, the latter for a club-record £4 million. Leavers included centre-back Dean Richards, for whom former manager Glenn Hoddle paid Southampton a club-record £8.1 million to bring to Tottenham Hotspur. After Strachan took over, the club signed Ecuadorian internationals Agustín Delgado and Cléber Chalá, striker Brett Ormerod, and French winger Fabrice Fernandes. After struggling in the relegation zone under Gray, the Saints' form picked up around Christmas, although a poor run of results towards the end of the campaign prevented them from replicating the previous season's top-half finish.

Outside the league, Southampton were knocked out of the FA Cup in the third round and the League Cup in the fourth round. In the FA Cup, the club lost 1–2 at Rotherham United, a side recently promoted to the First Division but struggling against immediate relegation back to the third flight, with a late Marians Pahars penalty the side's only goal in the competition. In the League Cup, the Saints beat Second Division title contenders (and eventual winners) Brighton & Hove Albion and First Division mid-tablers Gillingham in the early rounds, before facing elimination at the hands of Premier League newcomers Bolton Wanderers in the fourth round. Wanderers won the tie 6–5 on penalties, after the teams were deadlocked 1–1 after normal time and 2–2 after extra time.

Southampton used 30 players during the 2001–02 season and had 13 different goalscorers. Marians Pahars finished as the club's top goalscorer for the second time in his third full season at the club, with 14 goals in the league and one each in the FA and League Cups. Left-back Wayne Bridge made the most appearances for the club for a second season running, featuring in all 42 fixtures across all three competitions. Chris Marsden won the annual Player of the Season award for 2001–02. The average league attendance at the new St Mary's Stadium during 2001–02 was 30,633. The highest attendance was a club-record 31,973 against Newcastle United on the last day of the season; the lowest was 26,794 against Aston Villa in September.

== Background and transfers ==
Southampton had finished the previous season in the top half of the Premier League table for the first time in six years, equalling the 10th-place finish achieved in the 1994–95 season. They had played the last two months of the campaign with Stuart Gray as temporary manager, following Glenn Hoddle's move to Tottenham Hotspur. After failing to win any of the first seven games under Gray, the club picked up back-to-back wins in their last two games of the season (against champions Manchester United and runners-up Arsenal) and his position was made permanent in the summer. Prior to Gray's confirmation as permanent manager, several replacements were touted by members of the press, including England coach Steve McClaren, former Tottenham Hotspur manager George Graham, and former West Ham United boss Harry Redknapp.

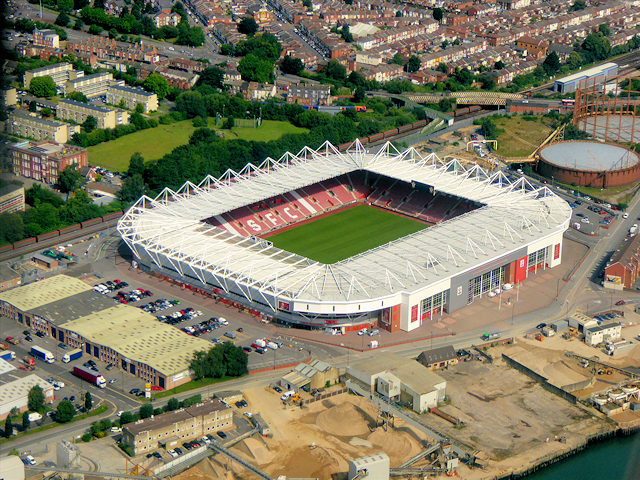
Southampton's new home venue St Mary's Stadium was completed in time for the start of the 2001–02 season.

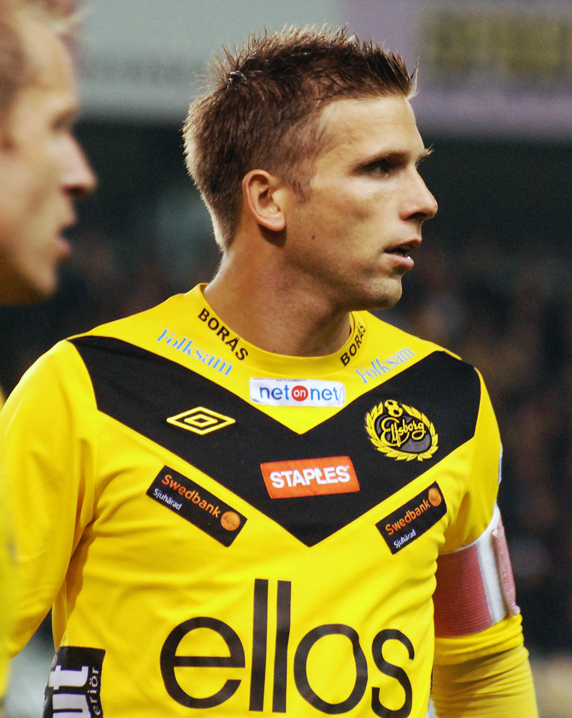
Swedish international Anders Svensson was Gray's first signing in the summer.

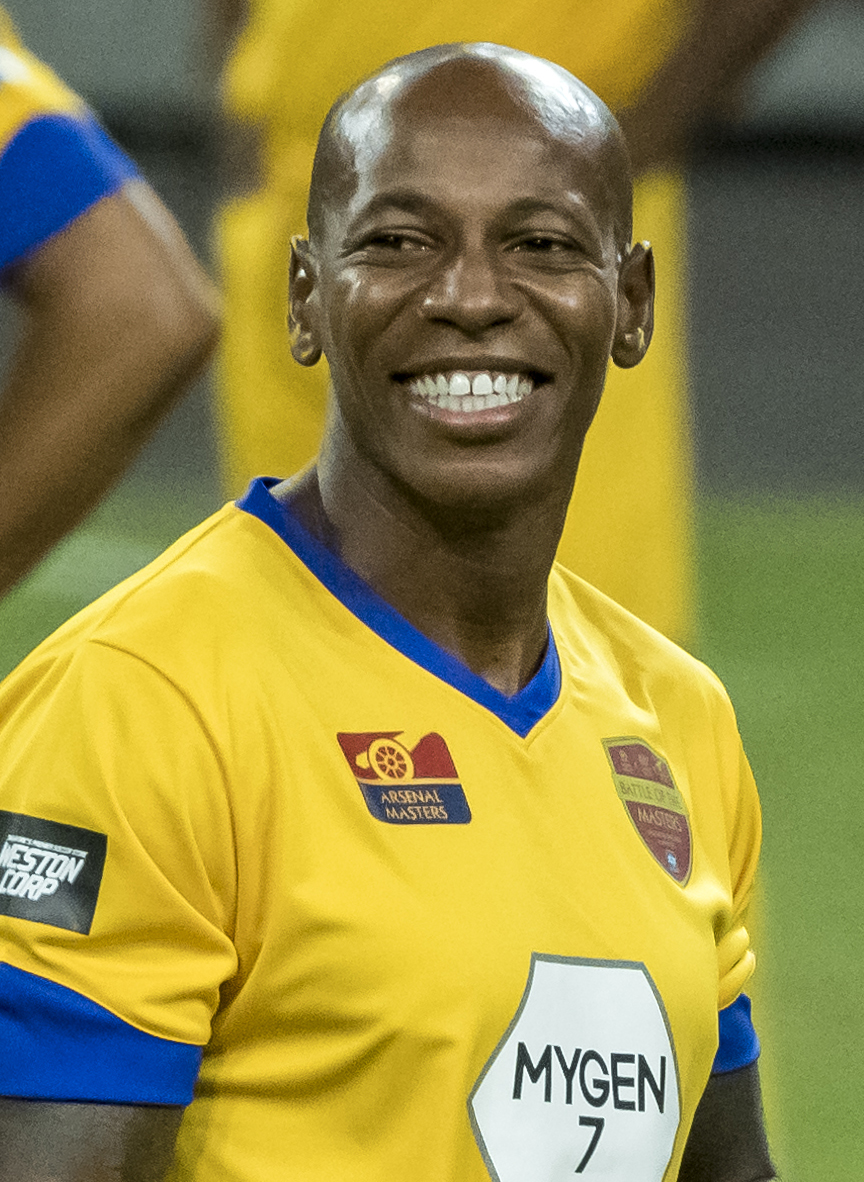
Having spent the entire previous season on loan at the club, Luís Boa Morte joined Fulham for £1.7 million.

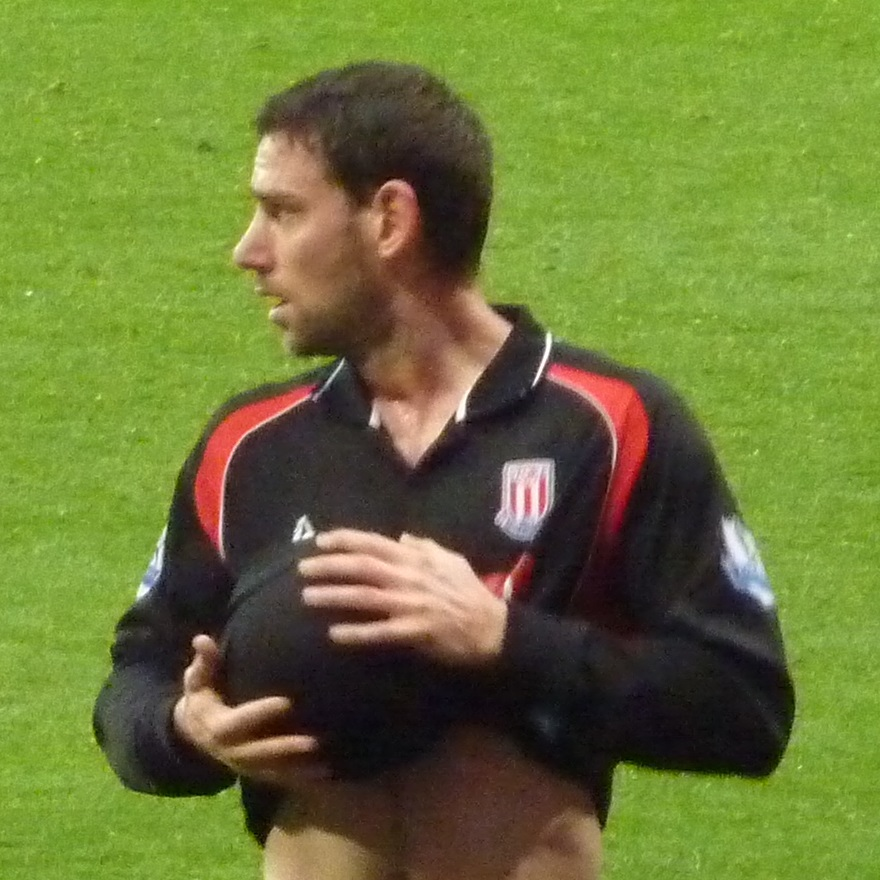
Southampton signed Irish midfielder Rory Delap for a club record fee of £4 million in July.

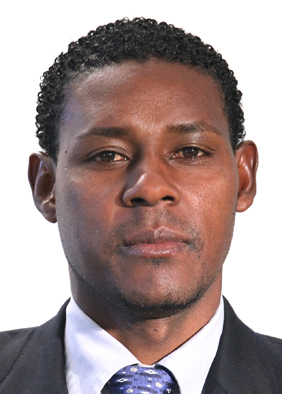
The club spent another £3.5 million in November to bring in Ecuadorian international striker Agustín Delgado.

The 2001–02 season also marked Southampton's first playing at St Mary's Stadium, after 103 years at The Dell. The stadium had been in the works since the summer of 1999, when it was first reported by local newspaper the Daily Echo that the club had secured £32 million in funding for its construction. Initially known as the "New Dell", Southampton's new home venue was at first due to be called the Friends Provident Stadium, as part of a sponsorship deal with the financial services company; following "fans' protests", however, it was renamed the Friends Provident St Mary's Stadium to recognise the role of the nearby St Mary's Church in the club's history.

While still waiting for confirmation of his status as manager, Gray signed Swedish midfielder Anders Svensson from Allsvenskan side Elfsborg for £700,000. The club also saw three players leave early in the summer – Portuguese winger Luís Boa Morte, who had helped Fulham achieve promotion to the Premier League during a season-long loan at the club, made his move permanent for a fee of £1.7 million; Moroccan midfielder Hassan Kachloul, whose contract had ended, joined Aston Villa; and Phil Warner, who had not played for Southampton since early in the 1998–99 season, moved on a free transfer to Cambridge United in the Football League Second Division. In July, Southampton spent a club-record fee of £4 million to bring Irish midfielder Rory Delap to the club from Derby County, doubling the previous club record of £2 million spent on striker David Hirst in October 1997. Jacinto Elá and Paul Murray arrived on free transfers, while Paul Hughes was released to Luton Town. A month into the league season, former Southampton manager Glenn Hoddle signed Dean Richards for Tottenham Hotspur, with the Saints receiving a club-record fee of £8.1 million for the centre-back after a "long-running transfer saga".

On 21 October 2001, with Southampton second from bottom in the league having picked up just two wins from their opening eight games, Gray was sacked. He was replaced the next day by Gordon Strachan, who had left Coventry City a month earlier after a poor start to their first season back in the First Division following relegation from the Premier League the year before. Strachan's first signing followed four days after his arrival, when he brought in centre-back Paul Williams on a short-term loan from his previous club. The deal was made permanent within a week, on the same day as Paul Telfer – another former Coventry defender – joined on a free transfer. Around the same time, out-of-favour German striker Uwe Rösler moved on a short-term loan to First Division club West Bromwich Albion to take over from Danny Dichio, who had recently finished a loan spell.

Strachan continued to bolster the Southampton squad during his first few months in charge, first signing two Ecuadorian internationals – Agustín Delgado for £3.5 million from Mexican club Necaxa and Cléber Chalá for £1 million from El Nacional – within three days of one another in November. A week later, he brought in 18-year-old centre-back Mike Williamson from Third Division side Torquay United, paying £100,000 for the teenager. In early December, with the club back in the relegation zone having scored just 11 goals in 13 games, the Saints signed striker Brett Ormerod for £1.75 million from Second Division side Blackpool, where he had already scored 20 goals since the start of the season. The next week, Paul Murray – who had joined the club in July after former coach Mick Wadsworth had joined as assistant manager – moved to Oldham Athletic, where Wadsworth had taken over as manager. At the end of the month, the club signed Fabrice Fernandes from Stade Rennais for £1.1 million, and loaned Dani Rodrigues to Bristol City.

In the new year, Uwe Rösler finally left Southampton on a permanent basis to return to Germany with Unterhaching, having been listed for free transfer at the beginning of the season. In February, young striker Mark Peters left Southampton to join Second Division side Brentford on a free transfer, while goalkeeper Scott Bevan was sent out on a short loan to Stoke City. In March, Bevan joined Woking until the end of the season. Around the same time, Southampton brought in French striker Eric Hassli on loan from Metz, as well as releasing Argentine winger Adrian Caceres to Hull City, having never given him a first-team game since his arrival in September 2000. On transfer deadline day, three Southampton players were released on free transfers – Ryan Ashford to Torquay United, Kevin Gibbens to Oxford United, and youngster Adam Wallace to Southend United.

Players transferred in

Name	Nationality	Pos.	Club	Date	Fee	Ref.
Anders Svensson	Sweden	MF	(Sweden) Elfsborg	12 June 2001	£700,000	
Rory Delap	Republic of Ireland	MF	(England) Derby County	10 July 2001	£4,000,000	
Jacinto Elá	Equatorial Guinea	MF	(Spain) Espanyol	11 July 2001	Free	
Paul Murray	England	MF	(England) Queens Park Rangers	23 July 2001	Free	
Paul Telfer	Scotland	DF	(England) Coventry City	31 October 2001	Free	
Paul Williams	England	DF	(England) Coventry City	31 October 2001	Free	
Agustín Delgado	Ecuador	FW	(Mexico) Necaxa	13 November 2001	£3,500,000	
Cléber Chalá	Ecuador	MF	(Ecuador) El Nacional	16 November 2001	£1,000,000	
Mike Williamson	England	DF	(England) Torquay United	20 November 2001	£100,000	
Brett Ormerod	England	FW	(England) Blackpool	5 December 2001	£1,750,000	
Fabrice Fernandes	France	MF	(France) Rennes	28 December 2001	£1,100,000	

Players transferred out

Name	Nationality	Pos.	Club	Date	Fee	Ref.
Phil Warner	England	DF	(England) Cambridge United	31 May 2001	Free	
Luís Boa Morte	Portugal	MF	(England) Fulham	14 June 2001	£1,700,000	
Hassan Kachloul	Morocco	MF	(England) Aston Villa	20 June 2001	Free	
Paul Hughes	England	MF	(England) Luton Town	10 August 2001	Free	
Dean Richards	England	DF	(England) Tottenham Hotspur	21 September 2001	£8,100,000	
Paul Murray	England	MF	(England) Oldham Athletic	11 December 2001	Free	
Uwe Rösler	Germany	FW	(Germany) Unterhaching	8 January 2002	Free	
Mark Peters	England	FW	(England) Brentford	15 February 2002	Free	
Adrian Caceres	Argentina	MF	(England) Hull City	18 March 2002	Free	
Ryan Ashford	England	DF	(England) Torquay United	28 March 2002	Free	
Kevin Gibbens	England	MF	(England) Oxford United	28 March 2002	Free	
Adam Wallace	England	FW	(England) Southend United	28 March 2002	Free	

Players loaned in

Name	Nationality	Pos.	Club	Date from	Date to	Ref.
Paul Williams	England	DF	(England) Coventry City	26 October 2001	30 October 2001	
Eric Hassli	France	FW	(France) Metz	15 March 2002	End of season	

Players loaned out

Name	Nationality	Pos.	Club	Date from	Date to	Ref.
Adrian Caceres	Argentina	FW	(England) Brentford	7 September 2001	7 October 2001	
Uwe Rösler	Germany	FW	(England) West Bromwich Albion	30 October 2001	30 November 2001	
Dani Rodrigues	Portugal	MF	(England) Bristol City	31 December 2001	21 April 2002	
Scott Bevan	England	GK	(England) Stoke City	1 February 2002	11 February 2002	
Scott Bevan	England	GK	(England) Woking	15 March 2002	End of season	

== Pre-season friendlies ==
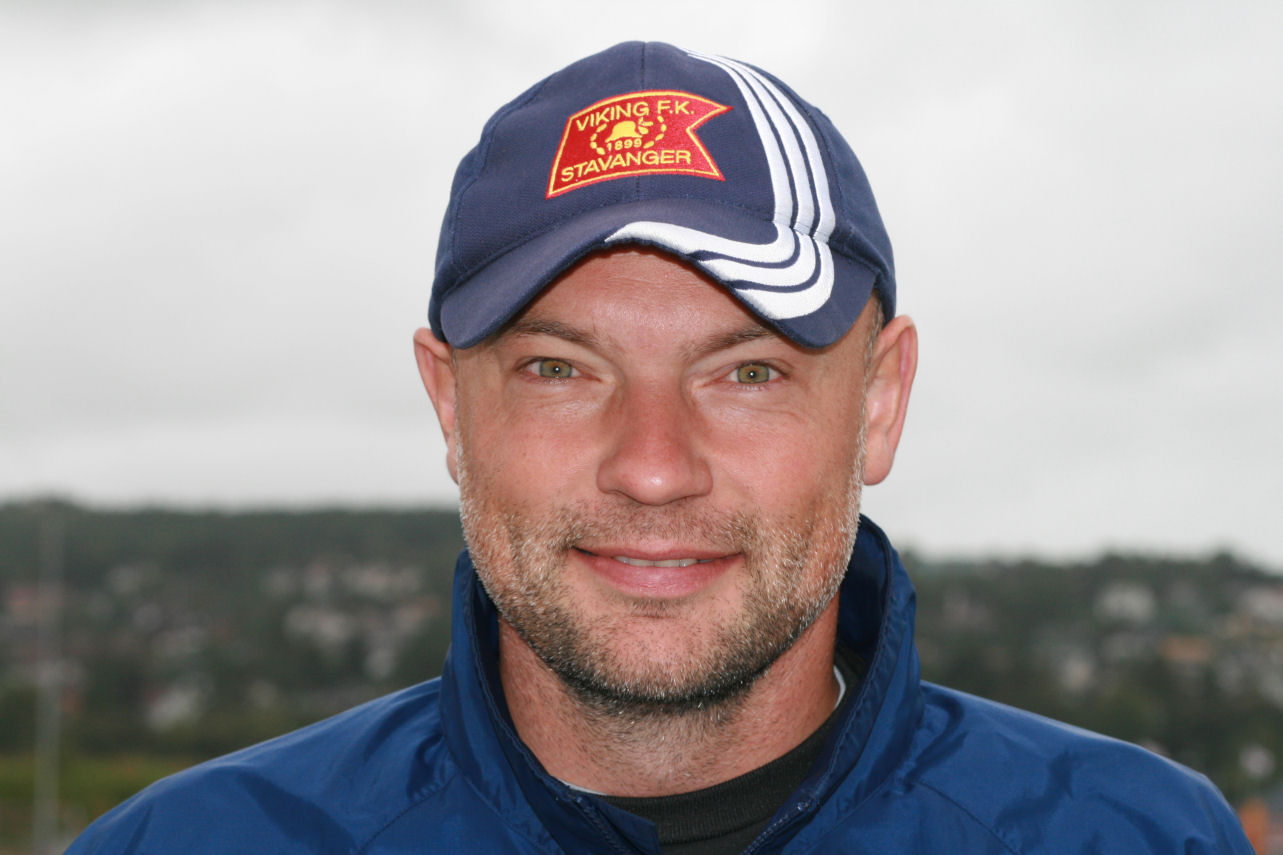
Uwe Rösler scored three times during Southampton's pre-season preparations.

Ahead of the 2001–02 season, Southampton played eight pre-season friendlies. The first two took place on the same day against local non-league sides, as the Saints beat Isthmian League Premier Division side Aldershot Town and Conference club Farnborough Town 2–1 and 3–1, respectively. In the former, which saw Queens Park Rangers defender Paul Murray making a trial appearance ahead of signing a week later, the Premier League visitors scored either side of half-time through Uwe Rösler and Jo Tessem, before John Nutter scored a consolation for the hosts after just a minute trailing by two goals. In the latter, Southampton overturned a 0–1 deficit to score three in the last 25 minutes of the game, with Tahar El Khalej, Mark Peters and Matt Le Tissier scoring in quick succession to secure the win. Three days later, the club faced Second Division side Swindon Town at the County Ground, winning the tie 3–0. In a game described by the Daily Echo as a "one-sided victory", the Saints scored through Claus Lundekvam, Kevin Davies and Le Tissier.

Southampton's fourth pre-season friendly took place in the Netherlands against Eredivisie runners-up Feyenoord. The visitors "started brightly", with new signings Anders Svensson and Rory Delap leading most of the English side's pressure, but it was Feyenoord who scored the only goal of the game through Ebi Smolarek. The next day, the club bounced back with a 4–0 victory over Southern League Premier Division side Newport County. James Beattie scored twice in the first 25 minutes, before Imants Bleidelis made it 3–0 on the stroke of half-time and Scott McDonald added a fourth late on. August started with a friendly at First Division side Nottingham Forest, which the Saints lost 1–2. Beattie opened the scoring again, but despite "dictat[ing] the second half" the Premier League side went behind through "two flukes in the space of seven minutes", as shots from David Prutton and Stern John saw efforts rebound in off Saints players to give them the win. The scoreline was reversed a few days later for Southampton's penultimate pre-season friendly, as they beat Bristol City of the Second Division 2–1 at Ashton Gate thanks to the first and only goals of the pre-season for Marians Pahars and Dan Petrescu, both of which came in the first half.

One week before the opening of the 2001–02 Premier League campaign, Southampton played their final game of the pre-season period, hosting Spanish side Espanyol in the first game at St Mary's Stadium. The visitors dominated the hosts in the first half, going 4–0 ahead by the break thanks to goals from Martín Posse, David Aganzo, Quique de Lucas and Antonio Soldevilla. Ten minutes into the second half, substitute Kevin Davies became the first Southampton player to score at the new stadium, when he turned in a cross to pull one back for the hosts. Just six minutes later, Rösler headed in for 2–4, before adding his second and the team's third with another header just over ten minutes after; the German striker almost completed a hat-trick and a Saints comeback in injury time, but failed to convert from a Stuart Ripley cross.

18 July 2001 Friendly	Aldershot Town	1–2	Southampton	Aldershot
	Nutter 56'	Report	Rösler 23'; Tessem 55'	Stadium: Recreation Ground; Attendance: 2,038; Referee: Kevin Merchant

18 July 2001 Friendly	Farnborough Town	1–3	Southampton	Farnborough
	Crawshaw 65' (pen.)	Report	El Khalej 69'; Peters 75'; Le Tissier 76'	Stadium: Cherrywood Road

21 July 2001 Friendly	Swindon Town	0–3	Southampton	Swindon
		Report	Lundekvam 28'; Davies 67'; Le Tissier 82'	Stadium: County Ground

29 July 2001 Friendly	(Netherlands) Feyenoord	1–0	Southampton	Rotterdam, Netherlands
	Smolarek	Report		Stadium: De Kuip; Attendance: 35,000; Referee: René Temmink

30 July 2001 Friendly	(Wales) Newport County	0–4	Southampton	Newport, Wales
		Report	Beattie 11', 24'; Bleidelis 45'; McDonald	Stadium: Rodney Parade; Attendance: 1,500

1 August 2001 Friendly	Nottingham Forest	2–1	Southampton	Nottingham
	Lundekvam 71' (o.g.); Jones 78' (o.g.)	Report	Beattie 66'	Stadium: City Ground

4 August 2001 Friendly	Bristol City	1–2	Southampton	Bristol
	Correia	Report	Pahars 19'; Petrescu 37'	Stadium: Ashton Gate; Attendance: 6,406; Referee: Clive Wilkes

11 August 2001 Friendly	Southampton	3–4	(Spain) Espanyol	Southampton
15:00 BST	Davies 55'; Rösler 61', 74'	Report	Posse; Aganzo de Lucas 32'; Soldevilla 42'	Stadium: St Mary's Stadium

== FA Premier League ==
=== August–December 2001 ===
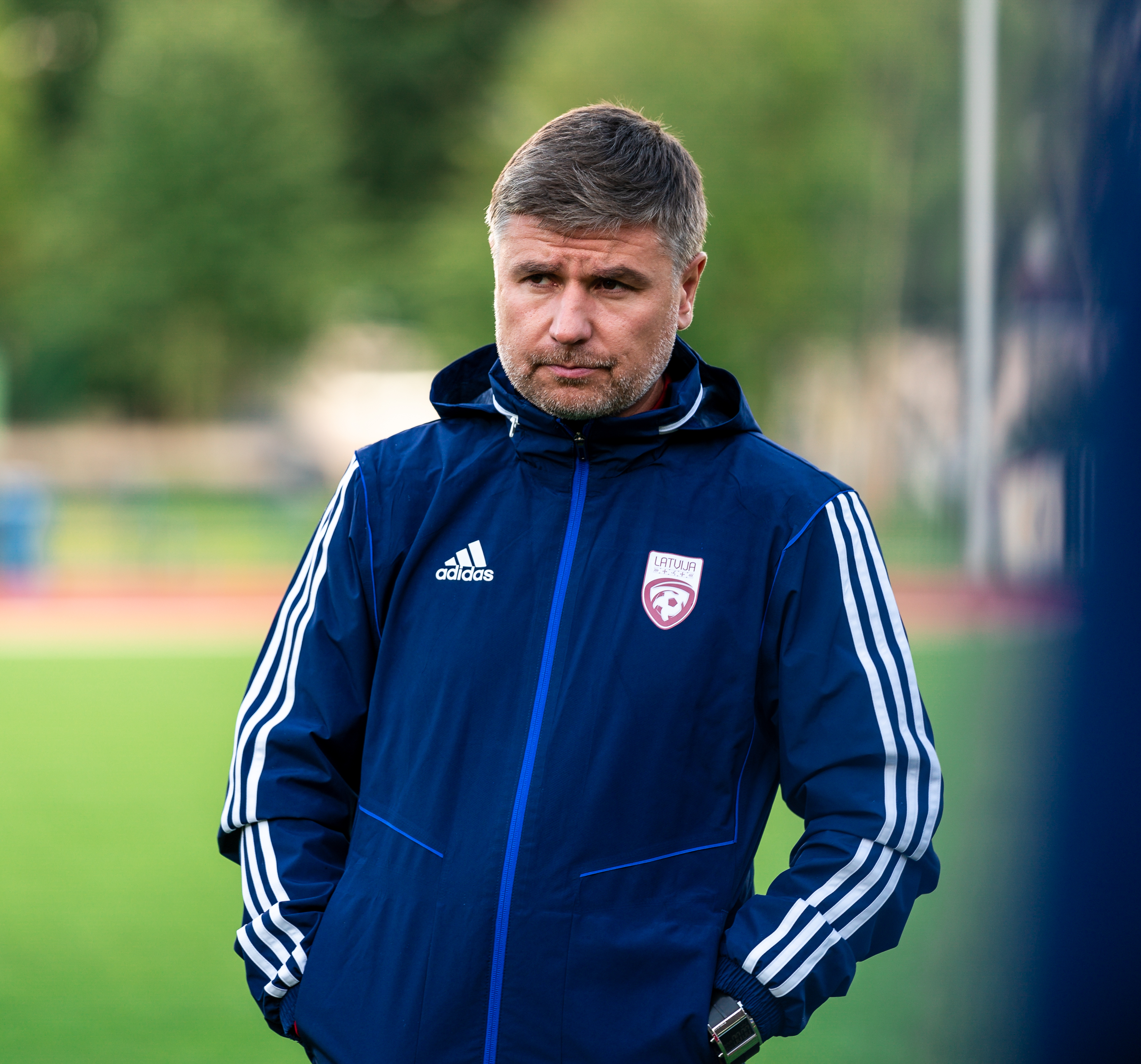
Marians Pahars scored half of Southampton's first eight goals of the season.

Southampton's first game of the season was away against Leeds United, who had finished the previous season fourth in the league, just one point behind Liverpool in the third and final UEFA Champions League qualifying place. Second-half goals from Lee Bowyer and substitute Alan Smith gave Leeds the win, while the Saints – who gave debuts to summer signings Anders Svensson and Rory Delap – saw centre-back Claus Lundekvam dismissed in the last minute of the game for a late challenge on Harry Kewell, which meant he was suspended for the next three games. Their first league game at St Mary's Stadium in front of a new club record attendance ended in the same scoreline, as the hosting Saints lost 0–2 to Chelsea thanks to goals from Jimmy Floyd Hasselbaink in the first half and Mario Stanić just before full-time. After a week off, the club suffered a third consecutive 0–2 defeat at Tottenham Hotspur, with their "resolute display" proving unsatisfactory as Christian Ziege and Simon Davies scored the hosts' goals in the final 25 minutes.

Sitting 19th after three games and no goals scored, Southampton played Bolton Wanderers the next week, who had followed their promotion back to the top flight by winning their first three matches of the season (and drawing the fourth, against Leeds) to go top of the Premier League table. The visiting Saints pulled off an unexpected 1–0 win, with Marians Pahars scoring the club's first goal of the campaign in the 81st minute to give them their first points of the season. Pahars scored his side's first goal at St Mary's the following week, but it was not enough to continue any momentum as the Saints succumbed to a 1–3 defeat at the hands of Aston Villa, dropping to the bottom of the league table as a result. Fortunes were reversed five days later for Southampton, when they beat Middlesbrough 3–1 at home, with Pahars' third goal in three games flanked by two from James Beattie. Having climbed back out of the relegation places, however, the team were back in the drop zone after another two 0–2 losses in October, first at home to title hopefuls Arsenal (in which Chris Marsden was sent off in the second half), then away against fellow strugglers West Ham United (courtesy of a second-half double from Frédéric Kanouté).

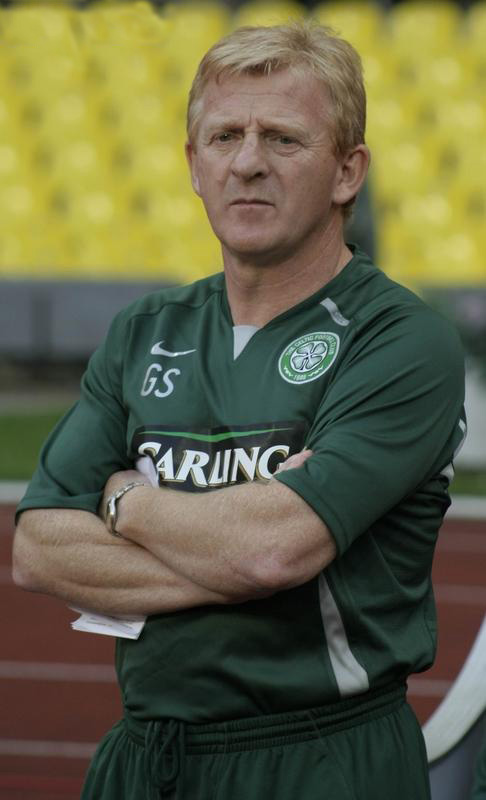
With the club in the relegation zone, Southampton replaced manager Stuart Gray with former Coventry City boss Gordon Strachan (pictured) in October.

With the club sitting 19th in the Premier League table with just two wins and five goals scored in their opening eight games of the season, Southampton sacked manager Stuart Gray on 21 October. The next day, it was announced that he had been replaced by Gordon Strachan, who had recently left Coventry City after a similarly poor start to their first season back in the First Division following relegation the year before. His first game in charge was at home against Ipswich Town, who were struggling just above the Saints despite finishing in fifth place the previous season. Strachan's side picked up the club's first point at St Mary's in a "thrilling" 3–3 draw, but were denied their first win at the new ground after leading by two goals twice during the game. Three days later, the club lost 1–2 at recently promoted side Fulham, who were one place higher than Ipswich, with Beattie scoring a consolation for the visitors in between two goals from Steed Malbranque, despite Pahars being "clearly offside" during the move. The club's poor run of home form continued the next week, when they lost 1–2 against Blackburn Rovers, who beat Southampton at home for the first time since 1938. Despite Pahars opening the scoring in the first half, the fan-dubbed "curse of St Mary's" continued after Craig Hignett scored a winner in injury time following Tugay Kerimoğlu's equaliser on the stroke of half-time. A third consecutive defeat followed against Derby County, who were bottom of the table before the match with just one win all season, with the 1–0 result giving new manager Colin Todd his first victory.

The result of the game against Derby saw Southampton taking their place at the bottom of the table with just 7 points from 12 games. A week later, however, the Saints finally picked up their first win at St Mary's Stadium and their first with Strachan as manager, when they beat Charlton Athletic 1–0 thanks to a second-half goal from Pahars – his sixth league goal of the season. The win took the club out of the relegation zone, and a 0–2 loss at Everton in their next game took them back there. This was followed by the club's biggest win of the season, as they beat Leicester City 4–0 at Filbert Street. Svensson opened the scoring with his first goal for the club in the first half, before Beattie, Svensson again and Pahars extended the visitors' lead after the break. The win marked Southampton's biggest away win in the Premier League to date. They followed this with their first back-to-back win against Sunderland, who they beat 2–0 at home thanks to an own goal and a Pahars strike.

In their last game before Christmas, just two weeks after their biggest win of the season, Southampton suffered their heaviest defeat of the campaign when they lost 1–6 at reigning champions Manchester United. After opening the scoring after just 31 seconds through summer signing Ruud van Nistelrooy, the hosts went 3–0 up before half-time as the Dutch striker added a second, before Ole Gunnar Solskjær scored a third just before the break. Six minutes into the second half, van Nistelrooy completed his first hat-trick for United; Pahars pulled one back for the Saints a minute later, before goals from Roy Keane and Phil Neville late on secured the five-goal gap. On Boxing Day, Southampton beat former manager Glenn Hoddle's Tottenham Hotspur 1–0, thanks to a goal 11 minutes into the second half from James Beattie – just before the break, Les Ferdinand "blasted over" from 10 yards out. The Saints ended 2001 with a 0–1 home loss to 4th-place Leeds United, who clinched the win with a last-minute goal from Lee Bowyer, who had a goal disallowed in the first half for offside. The result meant Southampton finished the year in 17th place in the table, equal on points with Derby County in 18th, but above the relegation zone on goal difference.

=== January–May 2002 ===
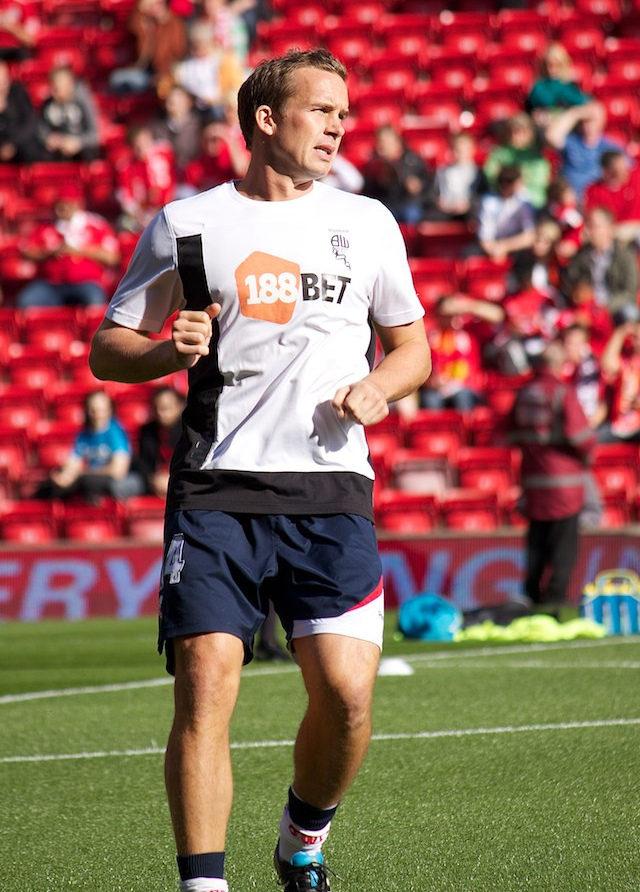
Kevin Davies scored his only two league goals of the season in consecutive games in January.

Southampton began 2002 with two wins in a row over title contenders, beating 6th-place Chelsea 4–2 at Stamford Bridge and 5th-place Liverpool 2–0 at St Mary's. After opening the scoring against Chelsea after just seven minutes through a James Beattie free-kick, the Saints found themselves behind at half-time after the hosts responded with goals from Eiður Guðjohnsen and Jimmy Floyd Hasselbaink. In the second half, however, goals from Marians Pahars and Chris Marsden put the visitors ahead, before Beattie's second later on confirmed the victory. Hosting Liverpool the next week, Southampton secured victory with two second-half goals, the first a Beattie penalty after a foul by Sami Hyypiä, the second an own goal by John Arne Riise less than ten minutes later. The wins saw the Saints jump five places to 12th in the league table. This was followed by a second loss to Manchester United, who overcame an early 0–1 deficit to win 3–1 thanks to goals from Ruud van Nistelrooy (equalling the Premier League record for goals in seven consecutive games), David Beckham and Ole Gunnar Solskjær. In the second half, Agustín Delgado made his league debut for the club, hitting the crossbar with a header late on.

A week after losing to United, Southampton played the return game against Liverpool at Anfield. The match ended in a 1–1 draw, with Michael Owen's 8th-minute opener cancelled out by Kevin Davies' first league goal of the campaign just after half-time. Anders Svensson hit the crossbar late in the game, with Davies missing the follow-up. At the end of the month, the Saints hosted fellow mid-table side West Ham United, beating the Hammers 2–0 thanks to a second goal from Davies and the only goal of the campaign for recent signing Fabrice Fernandes. This match featured the final competitive appearance for club legend Matt Le Tissier, who came on as a late substitute for Davies in his 443rd league and 540th overall appearance. A few days later, the club shared points with title challengers Arsenal thanks to a late Jo Tessem equaliser, following Sylvain Wiltord's 40th-minute opener. The next week saw 2nd-place Newcastle United ease past Southampton 3–1, with former Saints striker Alan Shearer scoring twice in the first half to secure the hosts' win. Southampton's final game of February was a goalless draw at home to struggling Bolton Wanderers, during which Rory Delap was sent off for dissent.

Now 14th in the Premier League table, Southampton picked up an important 3–1 away win over Ipswich Town on 2 March to stay clear of relegation risk. After a goalless first half, Delap opened the scoring for the visitors on 52 minutes, before Brett Ormerod scored his first goal for the club less than ten minutes later. Despite pulling one back late on through Finidi George, the hosts lost the points when Marsden secured victory with a "classy solo goal" just before the end. The win took Southampton up to a joint-high for the season of 11th place. The rest of March saw the Saints contesting numerous draws with teams also in the bottom half of the table. The first was a 1–1 home draw with Middlesbrough, who were just one place below them in the table, in which Anders Svensson's goal just before half time was cancelled out by Noel Whelan's equaliser just after the break. The next week, the Saints failed to beat bottom-place Leicester City, responding to two quick early goals from Brian Deane with two from Marians Pahars to share the points. Consecutive 1–1 draws with mid-table sides Sunderland and Fulham completed the month, with Southampton dropping a place to 12th in the Premier League table after five draws in a row.

April started with a 0–2 loss at Blackburn Rovers, who were battling against relegation. Both goals for the hosts came within a single two-minute spell midway through the first half, with Damien Duff scoring the first before setting up the second for Yordi. Five days later, the Saints beat fellow strugglers Derby County by the same scoreline, with goals from Matt Oakley and Marians Pahars either side of half-time ensuring the club remained clear of the drop zone. A 1–1 draw with Charlton Athletic was followed by two defeats in a row, as they lost 0–1 at home to Everton and 1–2 away at Aston Villa in the last two games of April. Southampton's final game of the season saw them beating Newcastle United 3–1 at St Mary's. Svensson opened the scoring in the 17th minute, before Beattie doubled the hosts' lead five minutes later with a penalty given for a foul by Newcastle goalkeeper Shay Given. Alan Shearer pulled one back for the visitors ten minutes into the second half, but despite a straight red card for Tahar El Khalej, they could not get back into the game and Paul Telfer scored a third and final goal for the Saints in injury time. Southampton finished the season 11th in the Premier League table, just one place lower than the previous season.

=== List of match results ===
18 August 2001 1	Leeds United	2–0	Southampton	Leeds
15:00 BST	Bowyer 67', (yellow card) 79'; Smith 81'	Report	Davies (yellow card) 18'; Marsden (yellow card) 24'; Lundekvam (red card) 90'	Stadium: Elland Road; Attendance: 39,715; Referee: Clive Wilkes

25 August 2001 2	Southampton	0–2	Chelsea	Southampton
15:00 BST		Report	Hasselbaink 33'; Grønkjær (yellow card) 67'; Stanić 90'	Stadium: St Mary's Stadium; Attendance: 31,107; Referee: David Elleray

9 September 2001 3	Tottenham Hotspur	2–0	Southampton	London
14:00 BST	Ziege 76'; Davies 87'	Report		Stadium: White Hart Lane; Attendance: 33,668; Referee: Alan Wiley

15 September 2001 4	Bolton Wanderers	0–1	Southampton	Bolton
15:00 BST	Whitlow (yellow card) 79'; Warhurst (yellow card) 82'	Report	El Khalej (yellow card) 17'; Pahars 77'	Stadium: Reebok Stadium; Attendance: 24,378; Referee: David Pugh

24 September 2001 5	Southampton	1–3	Aston Villa	Southampton
20:00 BST	Pahars 45'; Delap (red card) 52'	Report	Boateng 9'; Ángel 15'; Dublin (red card) 57'; Hendrie (yellow card) 64'; Kachloul (yellow card) 67'; Hadji 79'	Stadium: St Mary's Stadium; Attendance: 26,794; Referee: Steve Dunn

29 September 2001 6	Middlesbrough	1–3	Southampton	Middlesbrough
15:00 BST	Bokšić 75' (pen.)	Report	Delap (yellow card) 13'; Beattie 66', 86'; Pahars 73' (pen.)	Stadium: Riverside Stadium; Attendance: 26,142; Referee: Alan Wiley

13 October 2001 7	Southampton	0–2	Arsenal	Southampton
15:00 BST	Marsden (yellow card) 18' (yellow-red card) 59'; Monk (yellow card) 62'	Report	Pires 5'; Cole (yellow card) 39'; Henry 74'	Stadium: St Mary's Stadium; Attendance: 29,759; Referee: Graham Barber

20 October 2001 8	West Ham United	2–0	Southampton	London
15:00 BST	Kanouté 53', 81'	Report	Draper (yellow card) 28'	Stadium: Boleyn Ground; Attendance: 25,842; Referee: Neale Barry

24 October 2001 9	Southampton	3–3	Ipswich Town	Southampton
19:45 BST	Beattie 14', (yellow card) 40'; Pahars 23'; El Khalej (yellow card) 42'; Marsden 52'	Report	Stewart 38', 73'; Venus 64'; Peralta (yellow card) 86'	Stadium: St Mary's Stadium; Attendance: 29,614; Referee: Uriah Rennie

27 October 2001 10	Fulham	2–1	Southampton	London
15:00 BST	Malbranque 25', 33'	Report	Beattie 32', (yellow card) 37'; Oakley (yellow card) 71'	Stadium: Craven Cottage; Attendance: 18,771; Referee: Andy D'Urso

3 November 2001 11	Southampton	1–2	Blackburn Rovers	Southampton
15:00 GMT	Pahars 36'; Williams (yellow card) 57'	Report	Kerimoğlu 45'; Dunn (yellow card) 89'; Hignett 90'	Stadium: St Mary's Stadium; Attendance: 30,523; Referee: Alan Wiley

17 November 2001 12	Derby County	1–0	Southampton	Derby
15:00 GMT	Mawéné 25'	Report	Williams (yellow card) 35'	Stadium: Pride Park Stadium; Attendance: 32,063; Referee: Paul Durkin

24 November 2001 13	Southampton	1–0	Charlton Athletic	Southampton
15:00 GMT	Pahars 59'	Report	Brown (yellow card) 80'	Stadium: St Mary's Stadium; Attendance: 31,198; Referee: Dermot Gallagher

2 December 2001 14	Everton	2–0	Southampton	Liverpool
16:00 GMT	Radzinski 50'; Pembridge 86'	Report	Williams (yellow card) 18'	Stadium: Goodison Park; Attendance: 28,138; Referee: Jeff Winter

8 December 2001 15	Leicester City	0–4	Southampton	Leicester
15:00 GMT	Izzet (yellow card) 82'	Report	Svensson 12', 75'; Beattie 64'; Pahars 90'	Stadium: Filbert Street; Attendance: 20,321; Referee: Graham Poll

15 December 2001 16	Southampton	2–0	Sunderland	Southampton
15:00 GMT	Craddock 43' (o.g.); Pahars 67'; Marsden (yellow card) 83'	Report	Craddock (yellow card) 51'; McCann (yellow card) 59'	Stadium: St Mary's Stadium; Attendance: 29,459; Referee: David Pugh

22 December 2001 17	Manchester United	6–1	Southampton	Manchester
15:00 GMT	Nistelrooy 1', 34', 54'; Solskjær 41'; Keane 62'; Scholes (yellow card) 67'; P. Neville 78'	Report	Davies (yellow card) 28'; Pahars 55'	Stadium: Old Trafford; Attendance: 67,638; Referee: Steve Dunn

26 December 2001 18	Southampton	1–0	Tottenham Hotspur	Southampton
12:00 GMT	Beattie 56'	Report	Gardner (yellow card) 3'; Richards (yellow card) 86'; Taricco (yellow card) 89'	Stadium: St Mary's Stadium; Attendance: 31,719; Referee: Peter Jones

29 December 2001 19	Southampton	0–1	Leeds United	Southampton
15:00 GMT	Telfer (yellow card) 35'	Report	Mills (yellow card) 61'; Bowyer 89'	Stadium: St Mary's Stadium; Attendance: 31,622; Referee: Mark Halsey

1 January 2002 20	Chelsea	2–4	Southampton	London
15:00 GMT	Guðjohnsen 20'; Le Saux (yellow card) 43'; Hasselbaink 45'; Terry (yellow card) 90'	Report	Beattie 7', 73'; Pahars 55'; Dodd (yellow card) 61'; Marsden 64'	Stadium: Stamford Bridge; Attendance: 35,156; Referee: Eddie Wolstenholme

9 January 2002 21	Southampton	2–0	Liverpool	Southampton
20:00 GMT	Beattie 63' (pen.); Riise 71' (o.g.)	Report	Carragher (yellow card) 38'	Stadium: St Mary's Stadium; Attendance: 31,527; Referee: Neale Barry

13 January 2002 22	Southampton	1–3	Manchester United	Southampton
14:00 GMT	Beattie 3'; Marsden (yellow card) 45'	Report	van Nistelrooy 9'; Beckham 45'; Blanc (yellow card) 54'; Solskjær 63'	Stadium: St Mary's Stadium; Attendance: 31,858; Referee: Steve Bennett

19 January 2002 23	Liverpool	1–1	Southampton	Liverpool
15:00 GMT	Owen 8'	Report	Davies 46', (yellow card) 76'	Stadium: Anfield; Attendance: 43,710; Referee: Neale Barry

30 January 2002 24	Southampton	2–0	West Ham United	Southampton
19:45 GMT	Davies 43'; Fernandes 64'	Report	Řepka (yellow card) 63'; Hutchison (yellow card) 65'; Moncur (yellow card) 89'	Stadium: St Mary's Stadium; Attendance: 31,879; Referee: Phil Dowd

2 February 2002 25	Arsenal	1–1	Southampton	London
15:00 GMT	Wiltord 40'; Edu (yellow card) 79'; Henry (yellow card) 85'	Report	Davies (yellow card) 29'; Dodd (yellow card) 43'; Tessem 79'	Stadium: Arsenal Stadium; Attendance: 38,024; Referee: Clive Wilkes

9 February 2002 26	Newcastle United	3–1	Southampton	Newcastle upon Tyne
15:00 GMT	Robert 24'; Shearer 29', 45' (pen.)	Report	Pahars 39'; Davies (yellow card) 66'	Stadium: St James' Park; Attendance: 51,857; Referee: Barry Knight

23 February 2002 27	Southampton	0–0	Bolton Wanderers	Southampton
15:00 GMT	Delap (yellow card) 34' (yellow-red card) 90'	Report	Bobic (yellow card) 31'; Nolan (yellow card) 75'; Tøfting (yellow card) 88'	Stadium: St Mary's Stadium; Attendance: 31,380; Referee: Eddie Wolstenholme

2 March 2002 28	Ipswich Town	1–3	Southampton	Ipswich
15:00 GMT	George 82'	Report	Delap 52'; Ormerod 61'; Williams (yellow card) 84'; Marsden 88'	Stadium: Portman Road; Attendance: 25,440; Referee: Mark Halsey

6 March 2002 29	Southampton	1–1	Middlesbrough	Southampton
19:45 GMT	Svensson 38'; Lundekvam (yellow card) 84'	Report	Queudrue (yellow card) 29'; Whelan 57'; Festa (red card) 61'	Stadium: St Mary's Stadium; Attendance: 28,931; Referee: Uriah Rennie

16 March 2002 30	Southampton	2–2	Leicester City	Southampton
15:00 GMT	Pahars 28', 86' (pen.)	Report	Elliott (yellow card) 15'; Deane 21', 23'; Dickov (yellow card) 30'; Oakes (yellow card) 79'; Reeves (yellow card) 84'	Stadium: St Mary's Stadium; Attendance: 30,012; Referee: Mike Dean

23 March 2002 31	Sunderland	1–1	Southampton	Sunderland
15:00 GMT	McCann (yellow card) 9'; McAteer 62'; Mboma (yellow card) 65'	Report	Pahars (yellow card) 5'; Marsden (yellow card) 52'; Lundekvam (yellow card) 67'; Tessem 87'	Stadium: Stadium of Light; Attendance: 46,120; Referee: Matt Messias

30 March 2002 32	Southampton	1–1	Fulham	Southampton
15:00 GMT	Delap 21', (yellow card) 80'	Report	Marlet 7'; Brevett (yellow card) 44'	Stadium: St Mary's Stadium; Attendance: 31,616; Referee: Jeff Winter

1 April 2002 33	Blackburn Rovers	2–0	Southampton	Blackburn
20:00 BST	Duff 27'; Yordi 29'	Report	Dodd (yellow card) 58'	Stadium: Ewood Park; Attendance: 28,851; Referee: Clive Wilkes

6 April 2002 34	Southampton	2–0	Derby County	Southampton
15:00 BST	Oakley 29'; Pahars 54'; Williams (yellow card) 80'	Report		Stadium: St Mary's Stadium; Attendance: 29,263; Referee: Steve Bennett

13 April 2002 35	Charlton Athletic	1–1	Southampton	London
15:00 BST	Robinson (yellow card) 12'; Rufus 16'; Parker (yellow card) 61'	Report	Tessem (yellow card) 44'; Beattie (yellow card) 54'; El Khalej 85'	Stadium: The Valley; Attendance: 26,557; Referee: Phil Dowd

20 April 2002 36	Southampton	0–1	Everton	Southampton
17:15 BST	Delap (yellow card) 12'; Pahars (yellow card) 77'	Report	Watson 41'	Stadium: St Mary's Stadium; Attendance: 31,785; Referee: Mark Halsey

27 April 2002 37	Aston Villa	2–1	Southampton	Birmingham
15:00 BST	Vassell 8', 42'; Staunton (yellow card) 53'; Mellberg (yellow card) 89'	Report	Beattie 52'; Tessem (yellow card) 56'	Stadium: Villa Park; Attendance: 35,255; Referee: David Elleray

11 May 2002 38	Southampton	3–1	Newcastle United	Southampton
15:00 BST	Svensson 18'; Beattie 22' (pen.); El Khalej (red card) 55'; Telfer 90'	Report	Shearer 54'; Dabizas (yellow card) 63'	Stadium: St Mary's Stadium; Attendance: 31,973; Referee: Andy D'Urso

=== Final league table ===
Pos	Team	Pld	W	D	L	GF	GA	GD	Pts	Qualification or relegation
9	Tottenham Hotspur	38	14	8	16	49	53	−4	50	
10	Blackburn Rovers	38	12	10	16	55	51	+4	46	Qualification for the UEFA Cup first round (Note: Blackburn Rovers qualified for the UEFA Cup as League Cup winners.)
11	Southampton	38	12	9	17	46	54	−8	45	
12	Middlesbrough	38	12	9	17	35	47	−12	45	
13	Fulham	38	10	14	14	36	44	−8	44	Qualification for the Intertoto Cup second round

Source: RSSSF
Rules for classification: 1) points; 2) goal difference; 3) number of goals scored.

=== Results by matchday ===
Round	1	2	3	4	5	6	7	8	9	10	11	12	13	14	15	16	17	18	19	20	21	22	23	24	25	26	27	28	29	30	31	32	33	34	35	36	37	38
Ground	A	H	A	A	H	A	H	A	H	A	H	A	H	A	A	H	A	H	H	A	H	H	A	H	A	A	H	A	H	H	A	H	A	H	A	H	A	H
Result	L	L	L	W	L	W	L	L	D	L	L	L	W	L	W	W	L	W	L	W	W	L	D	W	D	L	D	W	D	D	D	D	L	W	D	L	L	W
Position	14	18	19	18	20	16	17	19	18	18	19	20	17	18	17	17	17	17	17	17	12	15	14	11	13	14	14	11	12	11	11	12	13	11	11	12	14	11

Source: 11v11.com
A = Away; H = Home; W = Win; D = Draw; L = Loss

== FA Cup ==
Southampton entered the 2001–02 FA Cup in the third round against Rotherham United, who had recently been promoted to the First Division. The game started in a "hectic" fashion, with both sides enjoying chances on goal, but it was the second-tier hosts who opened the scoring just before half-time when Richie Barker headed in a free-kick from Kevin Watson. Despite increasing the pressure after the break and nearly equalising through Marians Pahars, the Saints went two behind in the 55th minute when John Mullin doubled the Millers' lead. After Kevin Davies was fouled in the box later on, Pahars did pull one back for the Saints from the penalty spot, but the hosts held on for the win to send the Premier League side out of the competition at the first hurdle.

16 January 2002 Round 3	Rotherham United	2–1	Southampton	Rotherham
	Barker 39'; Mullin 55'	Report	Pahars 70' (pen.)	Stadium: Millmoor; Attendance: 8,464; Referee: Matt Messias

== League Cup ==
Southampton entered the 2001–02 League Cup in the second round against Brighton & Hove Albion of the Second Division. The top-flight side eased past the Seagulls 3–0, with James Beattie opening the scoring on the stroke of half time and Anders Svensson picking up a brace during the last 20 minutes of the game. The result marked the club's first win of the season and also included their first goals of the campaign, following three defeats in the league without scoring. In the third round, Southampton were hosted by First Division opponents Gillingham. The Saints opened the scoring within ten minutes when Beattie converted a "controversial penalty" given by the linesman for a foul by Roland Edge, with the Gills responding strongly and almost equalising on the stroke of half time. The Premier League visitors threatened to double their lead at various points throughout the second half, before finally sealing victory in the last ten minutes when Marians Pahars converted a cross from Beattie for 2–0.

In the fourth round, Southampton travelled for a third time to face Bolton Wanderers, who had recently joined the Premier League for the first time having won the previous season's First Division play-offs. After a goalless first half, Dean Holdsworth opened the scoring for the hosts ten minutes after the break, converting a penalty given for a foul by Paul Williams on Japanese striker Akinori Nishizawa. Kevin Davies scored ten minutes before the end of the game to send the fixture to extra time, during which substitute Michael Ricketts scored a second for Bolton before Tahar El Khalej equalised again for Southampton just a minute later. The game was decided by a penalty shootout which was won 6–5 by the Trotters, with Colin Hendry, Gareth Farrelly, Ricketts, Nicky Southall, Paul Warhurst and Rod Wallace all scoring from the spot; for the Saints, Marians Pahars, James Beattie, Jason Dodd, Paul Telfer and Paul Jones all scored, before Chris Marsden saw his penalty saved.

11 September 2001 Round 2	Brighton & Hove Albion	0–3	Southampton	Brighton
19:45 BST	Rogers (yellow card) 35'	Report	McDonald (yellow card) 31'; Beattie 44'; Svensson 71', 85'	Stadium: Withdean Stadium; Attendance: 6,489; Referee: Mick Fletcher

9 October 2001 Round 3	Gillingham	0–2	Southampton	Gillingham
19:45 BST	Hessenthaler (yellow card) 8'; Saunders (yellow card) 70'	Report	Beattie 9' (pen.); Marsden (yellow card) 25'; Monk (yellow card) 33'; Pahars 83'	Stadium: Priestfield Stadium; Attendance: 7,948; Referee: Andy D'Urso

27 November 2001 Round 4	Bolton Wanderers	2–2 (a.e.t.) (6–5 p)	Southampton	Bolton
20:00 GMT	Nishizawa (yellow card) 40'; Holdsworth 55' (pen.); Ricketts 110'	Report	Williams (yellow card) 28'; Marsden (yellow card) 73'; Davies 80'; El Khalej 111'	Stadium: Reebok Stadium; Attendance: 8,404; Referee: Andy D'Urso
	Penalties
	Hendry (penalty scored); Farrelly (penalty scored); Ricketts (penalty scored); Southall (penalty scored); Warhurst (penalty scored); Wallace (penalty scored)		(penalty scored) Pahars; (penalty scored) Beattie; (penalty scored) Dodd; (penalty scored) Telfer; (penalty scored) Jones; (penalty missed) Marsden

== Other matches ==
Outside the league and cup competitions, Southampton played just two additional matches during the 2001–02 season, either side of the final match of the league campaign. The first was a friendly against Second Division strugglers Bournemouth on 30 April 2002 to mark the reopening of the club's home ground, Dean Court. The Saints won the game 1–0 thanks to a "delightful lob" scored by Fabrice Fernandes less than two minutes into the second half. The second extra match took place two weeks later, three days after the league ended, and saw the Saints face an "England XI" side in a testimonial for retiring club legend Matt Le Tissier. The game ended in a 9–9 draw, with Le Tissier scoring for his side alongside brothers Carl and Kevin, while his 10-year-old son Mitchell scored five times for the England side in a late substitute display.

30 April 2002 Friendly	Bournemouth	0–1	Southampton	Bournemouth
			Fernandes 47'	Stadium: Dean Court; Attendance: 2,790; Referee: Darren Spicer

14 May 2002 Matt Le Tissier Testimonial	Southampton	9–9	England XI	Southampton
	Ormerod 11'; Ekelund 54'; Matt Le Tissier 57'; Davies 73'; Fernandes; C. Le Tissier 83'; K. Le Tissier 86'; Pearce (o.g.)		Shearer 58'; Wright; Keegan (pen.); Mitchell Le Tissier (pen.); Allen	Stadium: St Mary's Stadium; Attendance: 31,904; Referee: Mark Le Tissier

== Player details ==
Southampton used 30 players during the 2001–02 season, 13 of whom scored during the campaign. Nine players made their debut appearances for the club, including eight of their 11 first team signings (Rory Delap, Agustín Delgado, Fabrice Fernandes, Paul Murray, Brett Ormerod, Anders Svensson, Paul Telfer, and Paul Williams) and one player making the step up from youth to the first team (Scott McDonald). Two of these – McDonald and Murray – also made their last appearances for the Saints during the campaign, as did mid-season departees Dean Richards and Uwe Rösler, four players who left the following season (Imants Bleidelis, Tahar El Khalej, Neil Moss, and Dan Petrescu), and three who retired at the end of the season (Mark Draper, Matt Le Tissier, and Stuart Ripley). Left-back Wayne Bridge made the most appearances during the season, playing in all 42 games across all competitions. Marians Pahars finished as the club's top goalscorer for the second time, scoring 16 times in all competitions, just ahead of James Beattie on 14 goals. Chris Marsden, who switched from the centre to the left of midfield during the campaign, won the Southampton F.C. Player of the Season award.

=== Squad statistics ===
Southampton F.C. players 2001–02, with appearances and goals, showing squad number, playing position and nationality
No.	Name	Pos.	Nat.	Premier League		FA Cup		League Cup		Total		Discipline	
No.	Name	Pos.	Nat.	Apps.	Goals	Apps.	Goals	Apps.	Goals	Apps.	Goals	Yellow card	Red card
1	Paul Jones	GK	(Wales)	36	0	1	0	3	0	40	0	0	0
2	Jason Dodd	DF	(England)	26(3)	0	1	0	2	0	29(3)	0	3	0
3	Wayne Bridge	DF	(England)	38	0	1	0	3	0	42	0	0	0
4	Chris Marsden	MF	(England)	27(1)	3	1	0	2	0	30(1)	3	6	1
5	Claus Lundekvam	DF	(Norway)	34	0	1	0	2	0	37	0	2	1
6	Paul Williams	DF	(England)	27(1)	0	1	0	1	0	29(1)	0	6	0
7	Matt Le Tissier	MF	(England)	0(4)	0	0(1)	0	0	0	0(5)	0	0	0
8	Matt Oakley	MF	(England)	26(1)	1	0	0	3	0	29(1)	1	1	0
9	James Beattie	FW	(England)	24(4)	12	0	0	3	2	27(4)	14	3	0
10	Kevin Davies	FW	(England)	18(5)	2	0(1)	0	2(1)	1	20(7)	3	5	0
12	Anders Svensson	MF	(Sweden)	33(1)	4	1	0	3	2	37(1)	6	0	0
13	Neil Moss	GK	(England)	2	0	0	0	0	0	2	0	0	0
14	Stuart Ripley	MF	(England)	1(4)	0	0	0	0(1)	0	1(5)	0	0	0
15	Francis Benali	DF	(England)	0(3)	0	0	0	0	0	0(3)	0	0	0
16	Mark Draper	MF	(England)	1(1)	0	0	0	0(1)	0	1(2)	0	1	0
17	Marians Pahars	FW	(Latvia)	33(3)	14	1	1	2	1	36(3)	16	2	0
18	Rory Delap	MF	(Republic of Ireland)	24(4)	2	0	0	1	0	25(4)	2	3	2
20	Tahar El Khalej	DF	(Morocco)	12(1)	1	0	0	1(1)	1	13(2)	2	2	1
21	Jo Tessem	MF	(Norway)	7(15)	2	0	0	1(1)	0	8(16)	2	2	0
23	Jacinto Elá	MF	(Equatorial Guinea)	0	0	0	0	0	0	0	0	0	0
24	Dan Petrescu	DF	(Romania)	0(2)	0	0	0	0	0	0(2)	0	0	0
25	Garry Monk	DF	(England)	1(1)	0	0	0	1	0	2(1)	0	2	0
26	Imants Bleidelis	MF	(Latvia)	0(1)	0	0	0	0	0	0(1)	0	0	0
29	Fabrice Fernandes	MF	(France)	6(5)	1	1	0	0	0	7(5)	1	0	0
30	Scott McDonald	FW	(Australia)	0(2)	0	0	0	1	0	1(2)	0	1	0
33	Paul Telfer	MF	(Scotland)	27(1)	1	1	0	1	0	29(1)	1	1	0
34	Agustín Delgado	FW	(Ecuador)	0(1)	0	1	0	0	0	1(1)	0	0	0
35	Cléber Chalá	MF	(Ecuador)	0	0	0	0	0	0	0	0	0	0
36	Brett Ormerod	FW	(England)	8(10)	1	0	0	0	0	8(10)	1	0	0
Squad members who left before the end of the season
6	Dean Richards	DF	(England)	4	0	0	0	1	0	5	0	1	0
11	Uwe Rösler	FW	(Germany)	3(1)	0	0	0	0(1)	0	3(2)	0	0	0
22	Adrian Caceres	FW	(Argentina)	0	0	0	0	0	0	0	0	0	0
28	Kevin Gibbens	MF	(England)	0	0	0	0	0	0	0	0	0	0
29	Paul Murray	MF	(England)	0(1)	0	0	0	0	0	0(1)	0	0	0
31	Ryan Ashford	DF	(England)	0	0	0	0	0	0	0	0	0	0
Squad members who ended the season out on loan
27	Scott Bevan	GK	(England)	0	0	0	0	0	0	0	0	0	0

=== Most appearances ===
Rank	Name	Pos.	League		FA Cup		League Cup		Total		
Rank	Name	Pos.	Starts	Subs	Starts	Subs	Starts	Subs	Starts	Subs	Total
1	Wayne Bridge	DF	38	0	1	0	3	0	42	0	42
2	Paul Jones	GK	36	0	1	0	3	0	40	0	40
3	Marians Pahars	FW	33	3	1	0	2	0	36	3	39
4	Anders Svensson	MF	33	1	1	0	3	0	37	1	38
5	Claus Lundekvam	DF	34	0	1	0	2	0	37	0	37
6	Jason Dodd	DF	26	3	1	0	2	0	29	3	32
7	Chris Marsden	MF	27	1	1	0	2	0	30	1	31
7	James Beattie	FW	24	4	0	0	3	0	27	4	31
9	Matt Oakley	MF	26	1	0	0	3	0	29	1	30
9	Paul Telfer	MF	27	1	1	0	1	0	29	1	30
9	Paul Williams	DF	27	1	1	0	1	0	29	1	30

=== Top goalscorers ===
Rank	Name	Pos.	League		FA Cup		League Cup		Total		
Rank	Name	Pos.	Goals	Apps	Goals	Apps	Goals	Apps	Goals	Apps	GPG
1	Marians Pahars	FW	14	36	1	1	1	2	16	39	0.41
2	James Beattie	FW	12	28	0	0	2	3	14	31	0.45
3	Anders Svensson	MF	4	34	0	1	2	3	6	38	0.16
4	Kevin Davies	FW	2	23	0	1	1	3	3	27	0.11
4	Chris Marsden	MF	3	28	0	1	0	2	3	31	0.10
6	Tahar El Khalej	DF	1	13	0	0	1	2	2	15	0.13
6	Jo Tessem	MF	2	22	0	0	0	2	2	24	0.08
6	Rory Delap	MF	2	28	0	0	0	1	2	29	0.07
10	Fabrice Fernandes	MF	1	11	0	1	0	0	1	12	0.08
10	Brett Ormerod	FW	1	18	0	0	0	0	1	18	0.06
10	Matt Oakley	MF	1	27	0	0	0	3	1	30	0.03
10	Paul Telfer	MF	1	27	0	0	0	3	1	30	0.03

== Bibliography ==
- Holley, Duncan; Chalk, Gary (2003), Bull, David (ed.), In That Number: A Post-War Chronicle of Southampton FC, Bristol, England: Hagiology Publishing, ISBN 0-9534474-3-X
