= Aleksandrs Starkovs =

Latvian footballer

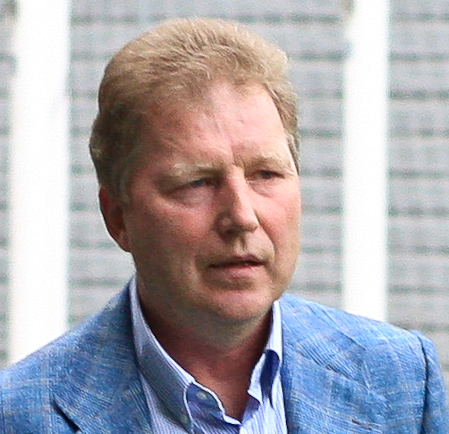

Personal information
- Date of birth: 26 July 1955 (age 71)
- Place of birth: Madona, Latvian SSR, Soviet Union (now Republic of Latvia)
- Position: Striker

Senior career*
Years	Team	Apps	(Gls)
1973–1975	RPI Rīga		
1975–1977	Daugava Rīga		
1977–1978	Dynamo Moscow	0	(0)
1978–1989	Daugava Rīga	417	(189)

International career
1979	Latvia amateur	6	(2)

Managerial career
- 1990–1993: FK Daugava Rīga (assistant)
- 1992–1994: Latvia U-21
- 1993–2004: Skonto FC
- 1995–2001: Latvia (assistant)
- 2001–2004: Latvia
- 2004–2006: Spartak Moscow
- 2006–2007: Skonto FC (sporting director)
- 2007–2013: Latvia
- 2010–2011: Skonto FC
- 2011–2012: FC Baku
- 2016–2017: Latvia (assistant)
- 2017–2018: Latvia
- 2019: Liepāja
- * Club domestic league appearances and goals

Aleksandrs Starkovs (born 26 July 1955) is a Latvian football coach and a former footballer who played as a forward. Most recently he coached FK Liepāja.

Starkovs has managed clubs such as Spartak Moscow in Russia, FK Baku in Azerbaijan and Skonto FC in Latvia. He had three stints with the Latvia national team.

== Playing career ==
Starkovs started playing football in Madona where he played for the local Olimpija Madona playing for which he was selected the best forward of the 1969 Latvia Leather ball tournament. In 1975 Starkovs joined FK Daugava Rīga. In 1978 Starkovs went to FC Dynamo Moscow but it was not the right team for him, so soon Starkovs was back in Riga. However his best years were still to come - in the 1980s Starkovs was one of the best snipers of the Soviet first league, scoring over a hundred goals for Daugava.

In November 2003, to celebrate UEFA's Jubilee, he was selected as the Golden Player of Latvia by the Latvian Football Federation as their most outstanding player of the past 50 years.

== Coaching career ==
As a team manager Starkovs made his name with Skonto FC which he brought to innumerable Latvian championships. He also worked with the Latvia U21 national team and in 2001 he was appointed the general manager of Latvia national team. He took over the Latvia national team after its disastrous performance in 2002 FIFA World Cup qualifiers and lead the team to its biggest success ever, qualifying for Euro 2004 with a victory over World Cup bronze medalist Turkey.

After his success as the national team coach, he joined Spartak Moscow winning the silver medal of the Russian league in 2005, but in April 2006 he was forced to quit due to total obstruction from the team's fans and a conflict with former team captain Dmitri Alenichev.

Starkovs returned to Latvia in 2007 and took over the Latvia national team, which had been struggling under Jurijs Andrejevs.

In late 2009 Starkovs accepted the offer to manage Skonto FC and officially became the manager of the club in January 2010 as Paul Ashworth left. His return was explicitly successful as he managed to win the league. In January 2011 Starkovs left Skonto FC, signing a contract in Azerbaijan with FC Baku. Besides the work with the Azerbaijan Premier League club he still remained the manager of Latvia national team.

Following series of unsuccessful matches Starkovs left his position on 15 July 2013, being replaced by the former Southampton F.C. star Marians Pahars. Having been linked with potential moves to various clubs and national teams over time, Starkovs, though, has not taken office at any of them, stating he is "waiting for an interesting offer football-wise". He is currently working at the Latvian Football Federation as the director of the National teams.
