= Skonto FC =

Former association football club in Riga, Latvia

- Full name: Skonto Football Club
- Founded: 15 December 1991; 34 years ago as Forums-Skonto
- Dissolved: 1 December 2016; 9 years ago
- Ground: Skonto Stadium, Riga
- Capacity: 9,500
- Chairman: Guntis Indriksons
- League: Latvian First League
- 2016: 8th
- Website: www.skontofc.com
Home colours	Away colours

Skonto FC was a Latvian professional football club, active from 1991 until 2016. The club played at the Skonto Stadium in Riga. Skonto won the Virsliga in the first 14 seasons of the league's resumption (15 in total), and often provided the core of the Latvia national football team. With those 14 national championships in a row, they set a European record, across men and women's football combined, until the women of Faroese club KÍ Klaksvík won their 14th championship in a row in 2013.

Following financial problems, the club was demoted to the Latvian First League in 2016 and went bankrupt in December of that year.

== History ==
=== Fourteen titles in a row (1991–2004) ===
Skonto FC was founded in 1991, under the guise of Forums-Skonto, led by businessman, former KGB officer and future Latvian Football Federation president Guntis Indriksons. The team, renamed Skonto in 1992, immediately started to win league championships, 14 in a row, until finishing second to FK Liepājas Metalurgs in 2005. In 2006, Skonto finished third in a close contest with FK Liepājas Metalurgs and FK Ventspils. Skonto also won the Latvian Cup on eight occasions, most recently in 2012.

Skonto had to win their early titles in fierce competition with FK Olimpija from Liepāja and RAF Jelgava. An additional game was required in 1992 season to break a tie and decide the winner. In the same 1992 season, Skonto FC made its debut in the Champion's League by beating the Faroe Islands champions Klaksvíkar Ítróttarfelag. At season's end, Aleksandrs Starkovs took over from Marks Zahodins as coach.

For the next 10 years in the domestic league none of their rivals were able to offer significant opposition to Skonto. For two seasons running the team did not lose a single match, surpassing their closest rivals by more than 20 points in the final standings, ensuring the regular title was awarded long before the end of the season. During the 1998 season, Skonto FC thrashed FK Valmiera 15–2, scoring the highest number of goals in a single game in the club's history.

During these years Skonto FC supplied the Latvian national team with most of its players: Māris Verpakovskis, Marians Pahars, Aleksandrs Koliņko, Vitālijs Astafjevs, Igors Stepanovs, Imants Bleidelis, Juris Laizāns, Mihails Zemļinskis, Valentīns Lobaņovs, Andrejs Rubins, and others. In 2004, a Latvian squad stocked with Skonto players managed to qualify for the UEFA Euro 2004 championship in Portugal.

Defender Mihails Zemļinskis made the most appearances for the club in domestic competition (252), and the most in European cup ties as well (52). Mihails Miholaps is Skonto's all-time top scorer with 155 goals in 216 domestic matches, and 18 in 38 European cup matches. In July 2000 Skonto defender Igors Stepanovs was sold to the English Premier League club Arsenal for a fee around £1 million. In January 2001 midfielder Juris Laizāns joined the Russian Premier League side CSKA Moscow for £1.57 million, the highest ever transfer fee received by a Latvian club at that time.

Skonto's first major victory in the European came in 1994, when they defeated Scotland's Aberdeen F.C., former European Super Cup winners; and in 1999 Skonto managed a 0–0 draw at home with Chelsea in a UEFA Champions League qualifier after losing 3–0 away two weeks earlier in what was Chelsea's first game in the Champions League. Skonto FC also played as Latvian champion against European giants Barcelona and Internazionale.

An exciting battle for the Latvian championship title occurred again in the final round of the 2001 season when Skonto trailed FK Ventspils by two points as they faced an away match against Liepājas Metalurgs, a team which also had hopes of becoming champions. Ventspils lost their match; Skonto won theirs; and Skonto were Latvian champions once more.

=== End of the winners' era (2005–2009) ===
Starting from 2005 Liepājas Metalurgs and FK Ventspils were in a close pursuit of Skonto, with their attempts proving to be successful. In 2004, the head coach Aleksandrs Starkovs – one of the essential pillars of the club – left Skonto FC by accepting a proposal to work at Spartak Moskva, that time champions of Russia. The leadership of the team was entrusted to Jurijs Andrejevs, his long-term assistant, but after the loss against FK Rabotnički, of the Republic of Macedonia, Skopje in the UEFA Champions League qualification tournament, he resigned from the post. Jurijs Andrejevs was replaced by Paul Ashworth, who had previously worked with FK Ventspils and FK Rīga in the Latvian Higher League and FC Rostov in the Russian Premier League.

=== Champions again (2010) ===
On 8 July 2010, Skonto lost in the Europa League first qualifying round to the Northern Irish club Portadown. In the first leg Skonto drew 1–1 away from home after an equaliser in injury time. They lost 1–0 at home and went out to a team who hadn't won a European tie in 36 years. Consolation came later in the season, when Skonto drew 2–2 at home to win the Latvian Higher League title for the first time since 2004. It was yet again done under the management of Aleksandrs Starkovs.

=== Financial crisis and bankruptcy (2011–2016) ===
In 2012 founder of the club and long-term president Guntis Indriksons left the post, as it was incompatible with the president's post of the Latvian Football Federation according to the newly established rules. Former player Vladimirs Koļesņičenko took over and, furthermore, the club's manager Marians Pahars accepted an offer to become the head coach of Latvia national U-21 football team. In 2012, Skonto won the Latvian Cup for the first time since 2002 and guaranteed themselves a spot in the first qualifying round of 2013–14 UEFA Europa League, even though this was later succeeded once again following the league achievements in 2012.

In 2013 Georgian manager Tamaz Pertia took over, and under his management, Skonto went on playing without a single loss for 26 matches out of the league's 27 regular games. Run down by injuries with a short amount of reserves, they were defeated by FK Jelgava in the last round of the tournament losing the title to FK Ventspils. Skonto participated considerably well in the 2013–14 UEFA Europa League matches, beating Moldovan FC Tiraspol on aggregate in the first round and being close to knock out the Czech club Slovan Liberec, which later went on to reach Round of 32 of the tournament. In-mid summer Skonto were struck by severe financial problems as their sponsors ended the sponsorship program due to their own financial difficulties. This led to a major loss of income and long-term delays of salaries and other payments.

Before the start of the 2014 season, Skonto initially were refused the A License necessary to play in the Latvian Higher League due to their long-term debts. However, the license was later obtained after a successful appeal. Sanctions followed from UEFA, with Skonto being disqualified from the 2014–15 UEFA Europa League, which they had qualified for. On 30 May 2014 the Latvian Football Federation issued a ban on Skonto registering new players during the summer transfer window until all the debts had been cleared. On 6 July, due to long-term non-payment of salaries, Skonto players refused to play the away match against FK Liepāja and the club suffered a 3–0 technical loss. On 14 July, club president Vladimirs Koļesņičenko announced his resignation and the club was taken over by Igors Zaicevs. On 2 September due to non-fulfillment of liabilities in the prescribed terms, LFF took away three points in the championship table, but on 17 September this penalty was reduced to just one point. On 14 October it was announced that Latvia's State Revenue Service had suspended the club's economic activity, with the possibility for an appeal to be submitted within one month. A day later, an additional four points were taken away in the tournament table, with Skonto losing even the theoretical chance to win the 2014 championship. The same day Skonto announced the resignation of its president Igors Zaicevs, but the club was still considering the option to submit an appeal to the State Revenue Service. In November 2014 it was announced that Skonto had finally cleared its debts with that time and previous players, still being indebted to the State Revenue Service.

Skonto did not obtain a license to play in the 2016 Higher League. Skonto appealed the decision, but the appeal was denied. Since 2015 Latvian First League runners-up Valmiera Glass FK/BSS rejected the opportunity to be promoted to the Higher League, 3rd placed Rīgas Futbola skola (RFS) was promoted instead. The club went bankrupt and left the first league in December 2016.

Since the club was denied a license to play in the Latvian First League, its remnants merged with RTU FC under the name of Skonto Academy before the start of the 2017 season. The team, now named RTU FC/Skonto Academy, played in the league until 2019, when it withdrew, possibly due to financial reasons.

== Stadium ==
Skonto played their home matches at the Skonto Stadium, which is also the home ground for Latvia national football team. The stadium was opened in 2000 and has a capacity of 10,000 people. Besides regular football matches this stadium has also hosted concerts of worldwide superstars like Depeche Mode, Massive Attack, Aerosmith and Metallica. The attendance of the last two was 32,000 and 33,000 people respectively. The record attendance in regards to a football match was reached on 15 November 2003, when Latvia beat Turkey 1–0 in the UEFA Euro 2004 qualification play-offs match and the game was attended by 9,500 spectators. The stadium is now used as the home-ground by the Latvian Higher League club Riga FC.

== Honours ==
- Virslīga
  - Champions (15): 1991, 1992, 1993, 1994, 1995, 1996, 1997, 1998, 1999, 2000, 2001, 2002, 2003, 2004, 2010
- Latvian Football Cup
  - Winners (8): 1992, 1995, 1997, 1998, 2000, 2001, 2002, 2011–12
  - Runners-up (7): 1991, 1996, 1999, 2003, 2004, 2006, 2013–14
- Baltic League
  - Winners: 2010–11
  - Runners-up: 2008
- Livonia Cup
  - Winners: 2003, 2004, 2005
- Turkmenistan President's Cup
  - Runners-up: 1996, 2009

== Players and staff ==
=== Player of the season (since 2010) ===
Season	Name
2010	(Latvia) Kaspars Dubra
2011	(Latvia) Igors Tarasovs
2012	Not specified
2013	(Lithuania) Paulius Grybauskas
2014	(Latvia) Vladislavs Gutkovskis
2015	(Latvia) Artūrs Karašausks

== Managers ==
Name	Period	Trophies
(Latvia) Marks Zahodins	1991–92	2 league titles, 1 Latvian Football Cup
(Latvia) Aleksandrs Starkovs	1 July 1993 – 2004, 1 Jan 2010 – 31 Dec 2010	12 league titles, 6 Latvian Football Cups
(Latvia) Jurijs Andrejevs	2004–05	1 league title
(England) Paul Ashworth	2005 – 31 Dec 2009	
(Latvia) Marians Pahars	1 Jan 2011 – 31 Dec 2012	1 Baltic League title, 1 Latvian Football Cup
(Georgia (country)) Tamaz Pertia	1 Jan 2013 – 14 Nov 2016	

== League and Cup history ==
=== Latvian SSR ===
Season	Division (Name)	Pos./Teams	Pl.	W	D	L	GS	GA	P	Latvian Football Cup	Top scorer (League)	Head Coach
1991	1st (Latvian SSR Higher League)	1/(20)	36	29	5	2	83	15	63	Runner-up	(Latvia) Jevgeņijs Gorjačilovs – 25	(Latvia) Marks Zahodins

=== Latvia ===
Season	Division (Name)	Pos./Teams	Pl.	W	D	L	GS	GA	P	Latvian Football Cup	Top scorer (League)	Head Coach
1992	1st (Virsliga)	1/(12)	24	18	2	2	51	10	38	Winner	(Latvia) Aleksejs Semjonovs – 12	(Latvia) Marks Zahodins
1993	1st (Virsliga)	1/(10)	18	17	0	1	63	7	34	1/2 finals	(Latvia) Aleksandrs Jeļisejevs – 20	(Latvia) Aleksandrs Starkovs
1994	1st (Virsliga)	1/(12)	22	20	2	0	76	9	42	1/4 finals	(Latvia) Vladimirs Babičevs – 14	(Latvia) Aleksandrs Starkovs
1995	1st (Virsliga)	1/(10)	28	25	3	0	99	15	78	Winner	(Latvia) Vitālijs Astafjevs – 15	(Latvia) Aleksandrs Starkovs
1996	1st (Virsliga)	1/(10)	28	23	4	1	98	12	73	Runner-up	(Ukraine) Aleksandr Pindeyev – 17	(Latvia) Aleksandrs Starkovs
1997	1st (Virsliga)	1/(9)	24	20	4	0	89	8	64	Winner	(Georgia (country)) David Chaladze – 25	(Latvia) Aleksandrs Starkovs
1998	1st (Virsliga)	1/(8)	28	21	4	3	98	27	67	Winner	(Latvia) Mihails Miholaps – 20	(Latvia) Aleksandrs Starkovs
1999	1st (Virsliga)	1/(8)	28	23	0	5	88	15	69	Runner-up	(Georgia (country)) David Chaladze – 16	(Latvia) Aleksandrs Starkovs
2000	1st (Virsliga)	1/(8)	28	24	3	1	86	10	75	Winner	(Latvia) Vladimirs Koļesņičenko – 17	(Latvia) Aleksandrs Starkovs
2001	1st (Virsliga)	1/(8)	28	22	2	4	94	26	68	Winner	(Latvia) Mihails Miholaps – 24	(Latvia) Aleksandrs Starkovs
2002	1st (Virsliga)	1/(8)	28	23	4	1	95	19	73	Winner	(Latvia) Mihails Miholaps – 23	(Latvia) Aleksandrs Starkovs
2003	1st (Virsliga)	1/(8)	28	23	4	1	91	9	73	Runner-up	(Latvia) Māris Verpakovskis – 22	(Latvia) Aleksandrs Starkovs
2004	1st (Virsliga)	1/(8)	28	22	3	3	65	18	69	1/2 finals	(Latvia) Mihails Miholaps – 16	(Latvia) Aleksandrs Starkovs / (Latvia) Jurijs Andrejevs
2005	1st (Virsliga)	2/(8)	28	17	7	4	59	25	58	1/2 finals	(Latvia) Gatis Kalniņš – 15	(Latvia) Jurijs Andrejevs / (England) Paul Ashworth
2006	1st (Virsliga)	3/(8)	28	16	6	6	55	21	54	Runner-up	(Latvia) Mihails Miholaps – 15	(England) Paul Ashworth
2007	1st (Virsliga)	4/(8)	28	16	7	5	54	27	55	1/2 finals	(Latvia) Astafjevs / (Latvia) Blanks / (Latvia) Višņakovs – 7	(England) Paul Ashworth
2008	1st (Virsliga)	3/(10)	28	15	7	5	43	31	71	1/2 finals	(Georgia (country)) Vladimir Dvalishvili – 9	(England) Paul Ashworth
2009	1st (Virsliga)	3/(9)	32	23	4	5	98	30	73	Not Held	(Latvia) Ivans Lukjanovs – 14	(England) Paul Ashworth / (Latvia) Aleksandrs Starkovs
2010	1st (Virsliga)	1/(10)	27	22	3	2	86	16	69	1/2 finals	(Brazil) Nathan Júnior – 18	(Latvia) Aleksandrs Starkovs
2011	1st (Virsliga)	4/(9)	32	17	9	6	62	21	60	1/4 finals	(Brazil) Nathan Júnior – 22	(Latvia) Marians Pahars
2012	1st (Virsliga)	2/(10)	36	21	11	4	58	22	74	Winner	(Latvia) Šabala / (Lithuania) Labukas – 11	(Latvia) Marians Pahars
2013	1st (Virsliga)	2/(10)	27	18	8	1	68	11	62	1/4 finals	(Latvia) Artūrs Karašausks – 16	(Georgia (country)) Tamaz Pertia
2014	1st (Virsliga)	2/(10)	36	25	1	10	77	34	71	Runner-up	(Latvia) Vladislavs Gutkovskis – 28	(Georgia (country)) Tamaz Pertia
2015	1st (Virsliga)	2/(7)	24	13	6	5	42	23	45	1/4 finals	(Latvia) Vladislavs Gutkovskis – 10	(Georgia (country)) Tamaz Pertia
2016	2nd (1.liga)	6/(15)	28	16	2	10	71	40	42	Fourth round	(Latvia) Jegors Morozs – 18	(Georgia (country)) Tamaz Pertia

== European record ==
Season	Competition	Round	Country	Opponent	Home	Away	Aggregate
1992–93	UEFA Champions League		(Faroe Islands)	KÍ Klaksvík	3–0	3–1	6–1
		1	(Poland)	Lech Poznań	0–0	0–2	0–2
1993–94	UEFA Champions League	PR	(Slovenia)	Olimpija Ljubljana	0–1	1–0	1–1 (11–10 p)
		1	(Russia)	Spartak Moskva	0–5	0–4	0–9
1994–95	UEFA Cup	PrR	(Scotland)	Aberdeen	0–0	1–1	1–1 (a)
		1	(Italy)	Napoli	0–1	0–2	0–3
1995–96	UEFA Cup	PrR	(Slovenia)	Maribor	0–2	1–0	1–2
1996–97	UEFA Cup	PrR	(Wales)	Newtown	3–0	4–1	7–1
		QR	(Sweden)	Malmö FF	1–1	0–3	1–4
1997–98	UEFA Champions League	1QR	(Malta)	Valletta	2–0	0–1	2–1
		2QR	(Spain)	Barcelona	0–1	2–3	2–4
1997–98	UEFA Cup	1	(Spain)	Real Valladolid	1–0	0–2	1–2
1998–99	UEFA Champions League	1QR	(Belarus)	Dinamo Minsk	0–0	2–1	2–1
		2QR	(Italy)	Internazionale	1–3	0–4	1–7
1998–99	UEFA Cup	1	(Russia)	Dynamo Moscow	2–3	2–2	4–5
1999–00	UEFA Champions League	1QR	(Luxembourg)	Jeunesse Esch	8–0	2–0	10–0
		2QR	(Romania)	Rapid București	2–1	3–3	5–4
		3QR	(England)	Chelsea	0–0	0–3	0–3
1999–00	UEFA Cup	1	(Poland)	Widzew Łódź	1–0	0–2	1–2
2000–01	UEFA Champions League	1QR	(Azerbaijan)	Shamkir FK	2–1	1–4	3–5
2001–02	UEFA Champions League	1QR	(Luxembourg)	F91 Dudelange	0–1	6–1	6–2
		2QR	(Poland)	Wisła Kraków	1–2	0–1	1–3
2002–03	UEFA Champions League	1QR	(Wales)	Barry Town	5–0	1–0	6–0
		2QR	(Bulgaria)	Levski Sofia	0–0	0–2	0–2
2003–04	UEFA Champions League	1QR	(Malta)	Sliema Wanderers	3–1	0–2	3–3 (a)
2004–05	UEFA Champions League	1QR	(Wales)	Rhyl	4–0	3–1	7–1
		2QR	(Turkey)	Trabzonspor	0–3	1–1	1–4
2005–06	UEFA Champions League	1QR	(North Macedonia)	FK Rabotnički	1–0	0–6	1–6
2006–07	UEFA Cup	1QR	(Luxembourg)	Jeunesse Esch	3–0	2–0	5–0
		2QR	(Norway)	Molde	1–2	0–0	1–2
2007–08	UEFA Cup	1QR	(Belarus)	Dinamo Minsk	0–2	1–1	1–3
2009–10	UEFA Europa League	2QR	(Republic of Ireland)	Derry City	1–1	0–1	1–2
2010–11	UEFA Europa League	1QR	(Northern Ireland)	Portadown	0–1	1–1	1–2
2011–12	UEFA Champions League	2QR	(Poland)	Wisła Kraków	0–1	0–2	0–3
2012–13	UEFA Europa League	2QR	(Croatia)	Hajduk Split	1–0	0–2	1–2
2013–14	UEFA Europa League	1QR	(Moldova)	Tiraspol	0–1	1–0	1–1 (4–2 p.)
2013–14	UEFA Europa League	2QR	(Czech Republic)	Slovan Liberec	2–1	0–1	2–2 (a)
2015–16	UEFA Europa League	1QR	(Republic of Ireland)	St Patrick's Athletic	2–1	2–0	4–1
2015–16	UEFA Europa League	2QR	(Hungary)	Debrecen	2–2	2–9	4–11

^{*Skonto FC were disqualified by UEFA due to long-term debts, not cleared in the restricted term}

=== UEFA Team ranking 2014–15 ===
Rank	Country	Team	Points
341	(Montenegro)	FK Zeta	3.125
342	(Iceland)	Stjarnan	3.100
343	(Latvia)	Skonto FC	3.100
344	(Latvia)	FK Liepājas Metalurgs	3.100
345	(Wales)	Bangor City	3.075

== See also ==
- The Invincibles (football)
