= Marians Pahars =

Latvian footballer and manager

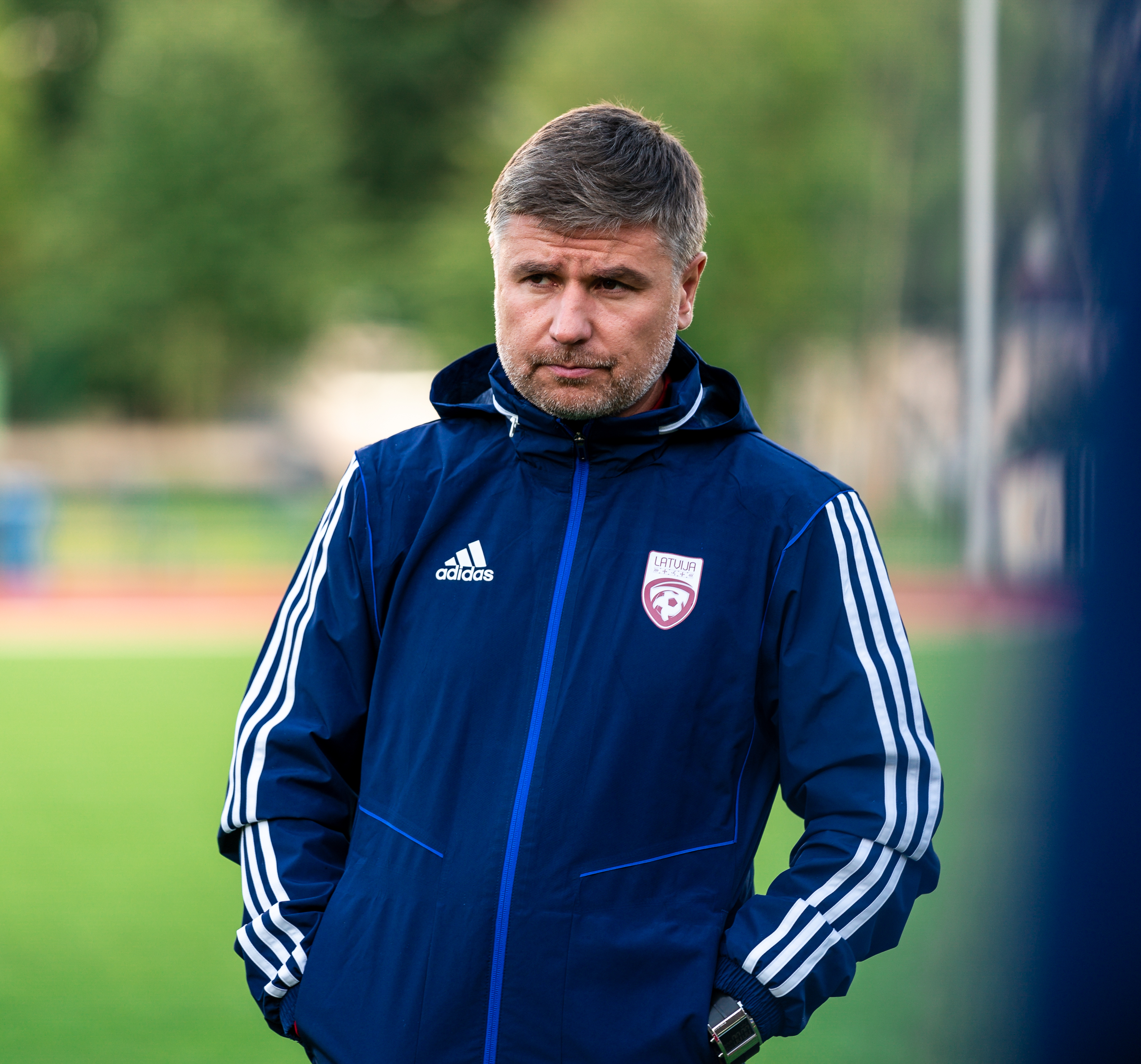
- Pahars in 2020

Personal information
- Date of birth: 5 August 1976 (age 50)
- Place of birth: Chornobai, Ukrainian SSR (now Ukraine)
- Height: 1.75 m (5 ft 9 in)
- Position: Forward

Senior career*
Years	Team	Apps	(Gls)
1994	Pārdaugava	17	(3)
1995	Skonto-Metāls	16	(4)
1995–1998	Skonto	85	(44)
1999–2006	Southampton	137	(43)
2006–2007	Anorthosis Famagusta	19	(4)
2008	Skonto	19	(8)
2009–2010	Jūrmala	2	(0)
Total		295	(106)

International career
1996–2007	Latvia	75	(15)

Managerial career
- 2011–2012: Skonto
- 2013: Latvia U21
- 2013–2017: Latvia
- 2018–2019: Jelgava
- 2021: Siena
- * Club domestic league appearances and goals

Marians Pahars (born 5 August 1976) is a Latvian professional football manager and a former player.

As a player, he spent the majority of his career operating as a striker for English club Southampton, where he played in the Premier League and the Championship, the latter of which he played during his final season for the club. Furthermore, he had two spells at Skonto in the Latvian Higher League. He also made 75 appearances for the Latvia national team, scoring 15 goals over an eleven-year period.

Having retired from football, Pahars entered a career in coaching, starting as assistant at Skonto, which resulted in his first appointment as a manager. He went on to manage Latvia at the under-21 and senior level, before returning to club management with Jelgava.

His Latvian given name is Marians; however, he was generally known as Marian during his career in England.

== Club career ==
=== Skonto ===
Born in Chornobai in Ukraine to Latvian parents, Pahars grew up supporting Spartak Moscow. When he was about eight years old, Jurijs Andrejevs, a coach from Skonto visited his school, as a result of which Pahars decided to play football. Andrejevs was to have a major influence on Pahars’ football career.

At 18, he signed for Pardaugava Riga moving on to Skonto Metāls and then into the Skonto first-team in 1995. He started playing as a midfielder, usually on the wings, before moving into a striker's role.

His best goal ratio came in 1995, when he scored eight in nine games, which he followed up with 12 goals in 28 games the following season, as he became a regular in the Latvia national team. In his prime, he was dubbed the "Latvian Michael Owen".

In the 1998 season, he scored 19 goals in 26 games for Skonto, and his progress was attracting attention from bigger clubs; he had trials with Salernitana (Italy), Werder Bremen (Germany) and Casino Salzburg (Austria), but he was recommended to Southampton's manager Dave Jones by Gary Johnson – the manager of the Latvian national team.

=== Southampton ===
He had a trial in a reserve team match against Oxford United on 10 February 1999 in which he scored a perfect hat-trick – a header and a goal with each foot in a 7–1 victory.

Southampton agreed a fee with Skonto of around £800,000 and, despite difficulties in obtaining a work permit and objections from the Professional Footballers' Association, these problems were overcome and he joined the Saints in March 1999, thus becoming the first Latvian to play in the Premier League.

He finally made his debut as a 70th-minute substitute away to Coventry City on 5 April 1999, with his home debut at The Dell coming on 17 April, when he came off the bench to score the crucial equaliser – and almost got a winner – against Blackburn Rovers in a 3–3 draw. At this time, the Saints were desperately trying to survive in the Premier League, and had gone into the final game of the season needing a win to guarantee their place for a further season. Pahars scored twice in the 2–0 win over Everton at the Dell, thus securing the Saints’ status in the Premiership for the following season.

He made 33 appearances during the 1999–00 season, finishing as the club's top scorer with 13 goals. By now, Dave Jones had been replaced as manager by Glenn Hoddle, who decided to move Pahars to a wide position, with the theory that he could scare the opposition, with his dribbling and pace, and provide for others as well as score himself.

After an impressive start to the 2000–01 season – finding the net six times as a striker, he returned to a deeper role, and his form slumped as a result. He was still a threat providing his teammates with opportunities, but his form was patchy and inconsistent and he only found the net three more times to take his tally for the season to nine goals.

After an indifferent start to the following season, he came off the bench to score the winner away to Bolton Wanderers on 15 September 2001. He scored at a regular rate over the next three months including the winner in a 1–0 victory over Charlton Athletic on 24 November – the Saints' first win in their new St Mary's Stadium.

Unfortunately, after the New Year, the goals dried up again, but he finished the season with his best total for the Saints of 16 goals in League and FA Cup. Pahars' 16 goals and 14 from strike partner James Beattie meant that the duo had the second best strike rate in the Premiership.

In the summer of 2002, Pahars required a hernia operation, which forced him to miss the whole of pre-season and although he scored a penalty in a 1–0 home win over Everton on 11 September, he never fully recovered from his injury. His early season was rather stop-start and was not helped by the suspension for receiving a red card at home to Manchester City on 5 October. He then severely injured an ankle in November 2002, which kept him out for most of the rest of the season, with another operation on the eve of the FA Cup final to round off a miserable 2002–03 season.

The start to the 2003–04 season was again hampered by injury and comebacks for the reserves were ruined by injury recurrences. He did manage to play the closing minutes, as Latvia claimed a place at Euro 2004. With that as an added incentive to get himself fully fit, he found himself back in the Saints starting line up for three successive games, which all ended in victories. His first goal of the season – and in more than a year – came at home to local rivals Portsmouth on 21 December 2003 in a 3–0 home win, when he curled a superb right footer into the bottom right corner.

After recovering from injury, he was then injured in 2004–05 pre-season in an away match at Swindon Town. A heavy, late tackle to the same ankle which had already undergone three operations ruled him out of the early part of the season. Comebacks for the reserves were promising, until problems flared up again, causing him to miss the whole of the season in frustrating circumstances, as the Saints were relegated after 28 years in the top flight of English Football.

His 2005–06 season was another frustrating one with injury after injury again seeing his comebacks ruined. He did make ten appearances during the season, scoring one goal, but it was not enough to save his Saints career, and, in May 2006, after seven years with 156 appearances and 45 goals for the club, it was announced that his contract with Southampton would not be renewed for the following season.

After the final game of the season, on 30 April 2006 Pahars took part in a 'lap of appreciation' by the Saints players around the St Mary's pitch, in an emotional goodbye for the player and many of the Southampton fans present.

=== Later spells ===
In July 2006 Pahars signed with Anorthosis Famagusta, a Cypriot team managed by former Georgian International Temuri Ketsbaia.

His injury problems were frequent during his stay at the club, and, as a result, in January 2008, he was released.

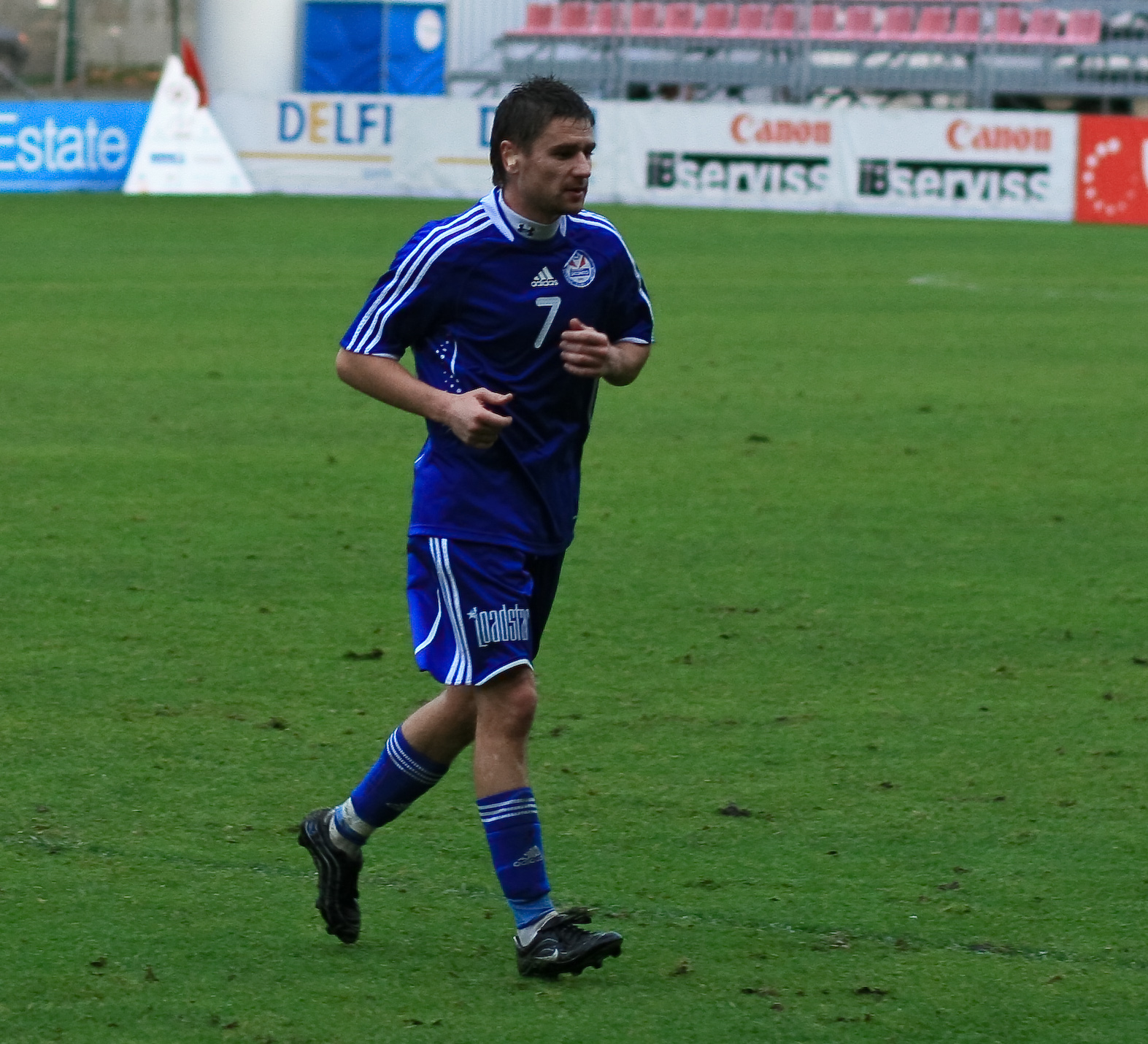
Pahars playing for Skonto

In 2008, he joined his former club Skonto, playing there for one season and helping the club reach good results in the national championship. After that season, he left Skonto, and joined Jūrmala, finishing his career there with two games in the national championship.

== International career ==
Pahars broke into the Latvia national team at the start of 1996, and made his debut on 12 March 1996 in a 1–0 friendly defeat away to Cyprus. His first goal for his country came in his ninth match at home to Poland in a 3–2 defeat also in a friendly on 17 February 1997.

On 2 September 2006, he returned to the Latvia national team for a match against Sweden. All in all, he played 75 times and scored 15 goals for Latvia.

Despite Latvia not qualifying for the World Cup Finals they did have success in June 2001 when they beat Estonia and Lithuania, to lift the Baltic Cup, with Pahars scoring in both games. Pahars was then named Latvian Footballer of the Year for a third successive year in November 2001.

During a spell of injuries, he managed to play in the closing minutes as Latvia claimed a place in the European Championships in 2004 with a 2–2 draw in Turkey on 19 November 2003.

He again struggled for full fitness, before scoring his first goal for Latvia in a 3–1 friendly win over Kazakhstan on 18 February – his first international goal since May 2002.

With so many injury problems over the season, he was a substitute for all three of 2004 UEFA Latvia's Group matches at Euro 2004, although he did taste the championships by coming off the bench in all three games.

== Managerial career ==
=== Skonto ===
In 2010, Pahars accepted an offer to become Aleksandrs Starkovs' assistant at Skonto, alongside legendary Vitālijs Astafjevs. He became the champion of Latvia in 2010 once again, this time in an assistant manager's role.

In 2011, Starkovs left for Baku in Azerbaijan and Pahars became the manager of the club. Managing the club for two seasons, he helped the club win the Baltic League in 2011 and lift the Latvian Football Cup, as well as finish as the runners-up of the Latvian Higher League in 2012.

In December 2012, Pahars left Skonto, being succeeded by Tamaz Pertia.

=== Latvia ===
Pahars accepted the opportunity to return to coaching, when the offer from LFF allowed him to become the manager of Latvian under-21 national team. Not long after his appointment, on 11 July 2013, Pahars was promoted, becoming the manager of the nation's senior team, shortly after Aleksandrs Starkovs vacated his position.

As manager, Pahars guided Latvia to the 2014 and 2016 Baltic Cups. However, he failed to guide the nation to qualification to the FIFA World Cup for both the 2014 and 2018 tournaments, as well as failing for qualification to the UEFA European Championship for the 2016 tournament.

=== Jelgava ===
Pahars returned to Latvian domestic football, taking charge of Jelgava ahead of their 2018 Latvian Higher League campaign. He guided them to a sixth-place finish in his inaugural season in charge.

In his second season in charge, Jelgava finished in seventh place in the Latvian Higher League, a minor drop in a position from their previous league campaign, with Pahars departing the club at the end of that season.

=== Siena ===
On 26 January 2021, he was hired by Italian club Siena, which was in the fourth-tier Serie D at the time due to previous bankruptcy. He resigned less than a month later, on 10 February, following a negative string of results.

== Outside football ==
Pahars was a candidate for Honoured to serve Riga in the 2020 Riga City Council election, but was not elected.

== Career statistics ==
=== Club ===
Appearances and goals by club, season and competition
Club	Season	League			National Cup		League Cup		Europe		Total	
Club	Season	Division	Apps	Goals	Apps	Goals	Apps	Goals	Apps	Goals	Apps	Goals
Pārdaugava	1994	Latvian Higher League	17	3								
Skonto-Metāls	1995	Latvian Higher League	16	4								
Skonto	1995	Latvian Higher League	9	8								
Skonto	1996	Latvian Higher League	28	12								
Skonto	1997	Latvian Higher League	22	5								
Skonto	1998	Latvian Higher League	26	19								
Skonto	Total		85	44								
Southampton	1998–99	Premier League	6	3	0	0	0	0	–		6	3
Southampton	1999–2000	Premier League	33	13	2	0	3	0	–		38	13
Southampton	2000–01	Premier League	31	9	4	0	2	0	–		37	9
Southampton	2001–02	Premier League	36	14	1	1	2	1	–		39	16
Southampton	2002–03	Premier League	9	1	0	0	1	0	–		10	1
Southampton	2003–04	Premier League	14	2	1	0	1	0	–		16	2
Southampton	2004–05	Premier League	0	0	0	0	0	0	–		0	0
Southampton	2005–06	Championship	8	1	2	0	0	0	–		10	1
Southampton	Total		137	43	10	1	9	1	0	0	156	45
Anorthosis Famagusta	2006–07	First Division	17	4								
Anorthosis Famagusta	2007–08	First Division	2	0								
Anorthosis Famagusta	Total		19	4								
Skonto	2008	Latvian Higher League	19	8								
Jūrmala	2009	Latvian Higher League	2	0								
Career total			295	106								

=== International ===
Appearances and goals by national team and year
National team	Year	Apps	Goals
Latvia	1996	5	0
Latvia	1997	13	2
Latvia	1998	11	5
Latvia	1999	6	2
Latvia	2000	6	0
Latvia	2001	8	4
Latvia	2002	6	1
Latvia	2003	1	0
Latvia	2004	6	1
Latvia	2005	0	0
Latvia	2006	3	0
Latvia	2007	9	0
Total		75	15

Scores and results list Latvia goal tally first, score column indicates score after each Pahars goal.

No.	Date	Venue	Opponent	Score	Result	Competition
1.	17 February 1997	Dherynia, Cyprus	Poland	1–2	2–3	1997 Cyprus International Football Tournament
2.	10 July 1997	Vilnius, Lithuania	Estonia	2–1	2–1	1997 Baltic Cup
3.	25 June 1998	Valga, Estonia	Estonia	1–0	2–0	1998 Baltic Cup
4.	8 February 1998	Ta'Qali, Malta	Malta	1–1	1–2	1998 Malta International Football Tournament
5.	10 February 1998	Ta'Qali, Malta	Albania	1–0	2–2	1998 Malta International Football Tournament
6.	10 February 1998	Ta'Qali, Malta	Albania	2–2	2–2	1998 Malta International Football Tournament
7.	6 September 1998	Oslo, Norway	Norway	1–0	3–1	UEFA Euro 2000 qualifying
8.	5 June 1999	Riga, Latvia	Slovenia	1–0	1–2	UEFA Euro 2000 qualifying
9.	9 October 1999	Riga, Latvia	Norway	1–1	1–2	UEFA Euro 2000 qualifying
10.	25 April 2001	Riga, Latvia	San Marino	1–0	1–1	2002 FIFA World Cup qualification
11.	2 June 2001	Brussels, Belgium	Belgium	1–3	1–3	2002 FIFA World Cup qualification
12.	3 July 2001	Riga, Latvia	Estonia	2–1	3–1	2001 Baltic Cup
13.	5 July 2001	Riga, Latvia	Lithuania	2–1	4–1	2001 Baltic Cup
14.	22 May 2002	Helsinki, Finland	Finland	1–0	1–2	Friendly
15.	18 February 2004	Larnaca, Cyprus	Kazakhstan	1–1	3–1	2004 Cyprus International Football Tournament

=== Managerial ===
As of 29 June 2021

Team	From	To	Record				
Team	From	To	G	W	D	L	Win %
Skonto	11 January 2011	21 December 2012	78	44	20	14	56.41
Latvia	11 July 2013	1 June 2017	33	7	11	15	21.21
Jelgava	27 March 2018	9 November 2019	60	15	14	31	25.00
Siena	25 January 2021	10 February 2021	5	0	1	4	0.00
Total			176	66	46	64	37.50

== Honours ==
=== As a player ===
Skonto

- Virslīga: 1995, 1996, 1997, 1998
- Latvian Football Cup: 1995, 1997, 1998

Individual

- Latvian Footballer of the Year: 1999, 2000, 2001

=== As a manager ===
- Baltic Cup: 2014, 2016
