= Tamaz Pertia =

Georgian footballer

Personal information
- Date of birth: 23 December 1974 (age 51)
- Place of birth: Tbilisi, Georgian SSR, Soviet Union
- Height: 1.70 m (5 ft 7 in)
- Position: Midfielder

Team information
- Current team: Gareji (head coach)

Senior career*
Years	Team	Apps	(Gls)
1991–1992	Dinamo Tbilisi	3	(0)
1991–1993	Guria Lanchkhuti	26	(2)
1993–1995	Metalurgi Rustavi	25	(5)
1995	Temp Shepetivka	4	(0)
1995–1996	Metalurgi Rustavi	28	(1)
1996	Merani-91 Tbilisi	10	(2)
1997–1998	Ventspils	28	(8)
1998–1999	Sheriff Tiraspol	23	(0)
2000	Dunav Ruse	6	(0)
2001–2002	FK Rīga	27	(2)
2002	Dinaburg Daugavpils	1	(0)
2003	RKB-Arma	24	(2)
2004–2005	Dinaburg Daugavpils	37	(2)
2005–2006	Ditton Daugavpils	19	(4)
2006	Lokomotiv Minsk	7	(3)

Managerial career
- 2008–2009: Dinaburg Daugavpils
- 2010–2011: Daugava Daugavpils
- 2011: JFK Olimps/RFS
- 2012: Skonto-2
- 2012–2016: Skonto Riga
- 2016–2018: FK Liepāja
- 2019–2021: Valmieras FK
- 2022–2024: FK Liepāja
- 2026: Kolkheti 1913
- 2026–: Gareji
- * Club domestic league appearances and goals

Tamaz Pertia (Georgian: თამაზ პერტია; born 23 December 1974) is a Georgian football coach and a former midfielder, currently working as head coach of 2nd division club Gareji.

== Playing career ==
During his playing career, Pertia has played for Lokomotiv Minsk in the Belarusian Premier League and many clubs from Georgia, Moldova and Latvia.

== Coaching career ==
In 2008 Pertia became the manager of Dinaburg Daugavpils – his previous club. On 2 June 2010 he became the manager of Daugava Daugavpils. Pertia left the club in July 2011 after the change of club's chairman and was succeeded by Leonid Nazarenko.

In August 2011 he accepted an offer to become the manager of JFK Olimps. After the club's relegation from the Latvian Higher League Pertia left the club, becoming the charmain of Skonto Riga youth academy. In 2012 Pertia succeeded Vitālijs Astafjevs as the manager of Skonto-2.

In December 2012, after Marians Pahars had left the club, Pertia accepted an offer to become the manager of Skonto Riga first team.

In November 2016 he became the manager of Latvian Higher League team FK Liepāja.

In March 2026, Pertia returned to Georgia after a 17-year pause to take charge of 2nd division club Kolkheti 1913.
