= 2009 Turkmenistan President's Cup =

2009 Turkmenistan President’s Cup
Prezident Kubogy 2009

Tournament details
- Host country: Turkmenistan
- Dates: 20 February - 28 February
- Teams: 8 (from 2 confederations)
- Venue(s): 1 (in 1 host city)

Tournament statistics
- Matches played: 16
- Goals scored: 33 (2.06 per match)
- Top scorer(s): (Turkmenistan) Azat Garajaýew (10 Different Players) (2 goals)
- Best player(s): (Turkmenistan) Krendelev

The 15th edition of the Turkmenistan President's Cup was played from February 20 to 28 with the participation of eight clubs.

Three of the eight teams participating in the 15th edition of the tournament competed for the Cup for the first time – the runners-up of Kyrgyzstan League, a participant of ‘the golden match’ in the national championships FC Abdysh-Ata, FC Hemmat from Iran and the youth team from Bahrain.

The bronze-medal winner of Virsliga, the 1996 Turkmenistan President's Cup finalist Skonto Rīga and the bronze-medal winner of the championships of Armenia FC Gandzasar Kapan competed in the tournament for the second time. The defending Turkmenistan President's Cup winner HTTU Aşgabat– for the fourth time, a finalist of the 2007 and 2008 international tournaments FC Aşgabat made the third attempt to win the prize.

The teams were split in two groups: Group A – Defending champions Turkmenistan's HTTU Aşgabat was pooled with Kyrgyzstan runners-up Abdysh-Ata, Latvian giants Skonto and Iranian outfit Hemmat Golestan; Group B – Tajikistan runners-up Parvoz, Gandzasar from Armenia, Bahrain youth team and Turkmenistan champions Aşgabat were in Group B.

Two best teams in each group qualified to the final stage and competed for the main prize, the runners-up competed for the third place.

The winning team was awarded with US$20,000 while the runners-up team was given US$10,000.

HTTU beat Aşgabat 2–1 in the final of previous year.

== Participating teams ==
Team	Qualifying method
(Turkmenistan) FC Aşgabat	Ýokary Liga 2008 winners
(Turkmenistan) HTTU Aşgabat	Ýokary Liga 2008 runners-up
(Kyrgyzstan) FC Abdysh-Ata	Kyrgyzstan League 2008 runners-up
(Latvia) Skonto Rīga	Virsliga 2008 3rd place
(Tajikistan) FC Parvoz	Tajik League 2008 runners-up
(Armenia) FC Gandzasar	Armenian Premier League 2008 3rd place
(Iran) Hemmat Golestan	Iranian regional league team
Bahrain Youth Team	

== Group stage ==
All times are local (UTC+5)

=== Group A ===
Team	Pts	Pld	W	D	L	GF	GA	GD
1. (Latvia) Skonto Rīga	7	3	2	1	0	8	0	+8
2. (Turkmenistan) HTTU Aşgabat	6	3	2	0	1	6	3	+3
3. (Kyrgyzstan) FC Abdysh-Ata	2	3	0	2	1	1	2	-1
4. (Iran) FC Hemmat	1	3	0	1	2	0	10	-10

==== Results ====
2009-02-20
15:00

HTTU Aşgabat (Turkmenistan)	4 - 0	(Iran) FC Hemmat
Daýançgylyç Urazow 6'; Begli Nurmyradow 27'; Azat Garajaýew 74'; Pirmyrat Gazakow 76'

Olympic Stadium, Ashgabat
2009-02-20
18:00

FC Abdysh-Ata (Kyrgyzstan)	0 - 0	(Latvia) Skonto Rīga

Olympic Stadium, Ashgabat

2009-02-22
15:00

FC Hemmat (Iran)	0 - 6	(Latvia) Skonto Rīga
		8', 42' Igors Kozlovs; 10' Andrejs Perepļotkins; 68' Vladimir Dvalishvili; 85' (pen.) Kristaps Blanks; 90+3' Nikolos Kozasuks

Olympic Stadium, Ashgabat
2009-02-22
18:00

HTTU Aşgabat (Turkmenistan)	2 - 1	(Kyrgyzstan) FC Abdysh-Ata
Pirmyrat Gazakow 5'; Berdi Şamyradow 33' (pen.)		36' Pavel Sidorenko

Olympic Stadium, Ashgabat

2009-02-24
15:00

FC Abdysh-Ata (Kyrgyzstan)	0 - 0	(Iran) FC Hemmat

Olympic Stadium, Ashgabat
2009-02-24
18:00

Skonto Rīga (Latvia)	2 - 0	(Turkmenistan) HTTU Aşgabat
Andrejs Perepļotkins 45'; Aleksandrs Fertovs 83'

Olympic Stadium, Ashgabat

=== Group B ===
Team	Pts	Pld	W	D	L	GF	GA	GD
1. (Turkmenistan) FC Aşgabat	7	3	2	1	0	4	1	+3
2. (Armenia) FC Gandzasar	3	3	0	3	0	2	2	0
3. (Tajikistan) FC Parvoz	2	3	0	2	1	2	3	-1
4. Bahrain Youth Team	2	3	0	2	1	1	3	-2

==== Results ====
2009-02-21
14:00

FC Parvoz (Tajikistan)	0 - 0	(Armenia) FC Gandzasar

Olympic Stadium, Ashgabat
2009-02-21
18:00

FC Aşgabat (Turkmenistan)	2 - 0	Bahrain Youth Team
Arif Mirzoyew 64'; Ruslan Mingazow 72'		(yellow card) 42' (red card) Hussein Jalil

Olympic Stadium, Ashgabat

2009-02-23
15:00

Bahrain Youth Team	1 - 1	(Armenia) FC Gandzasar
Abdullah Naser Mohamed 83'		60'Dragan Galić

Olympic Stadium, Ashgabat
2009-02-23
18:00

FC Aşgabat (Turkmenistan)	1 - 0	(Tajikistan) FC Parvoz
Ruslan Mingazow 56'		(yellow card) 53' (red card) Masud Rahimov

Olympic Stadium, Ashgabat

2009-02-25
15:00

FC Parvoz (Tajikistan)	2 - 2	Bahrain Youth Team
Mansurjon Hakimov 57', 90+1'		70' Abdullah Naser Mohamed; 85' Hamad Al Dahil

Olympic Stadium, Ashgabat
2009-02-25
18:00

FC Gandzasar (Armenia)	1 - 1	(Turkmenistan) FC Aşgabat
Virgil Marşavela 90+3'		65' Döwlet Durdyýew

Olympic Stadium, Ashgabat

== Knockout stage ==
Semi-finals
27 February - Olympic Stadium
(Latvia) Skonto Rīga (p)	1
(Armenia) FC Gandzasar	1
27 February - Olympic Stadium
(Turkmenistan) FC Aşgabat	0
(Turkmenistan) HTTU Aşgabat	1

Final
28 February - Olympic Stadium
(Latvia) Skonto Rīga	0
(Turkmenistan) HTTU Aşgabat	1
Third place
28 February - Olympic Stadium
(Armenia) FC Gandzasar	1
(Turkmenistan) FC Aşgabat	2

== Semi finals ==
2009-02-27
15:00

Skonto Rīga (Latvia)	1 – 1	(Armenia) FC Gandzasar
Aleksandrs Fertovs 19'		58' David Khanishvili
Penalties
Andrejs Perepļotkins (penalty scored); Aleksandrs Fertovs (penalty scored); Raivis Hščanovičs (penalty scored); Igors Tarasovs (penalty missed); Vladimir Dvalishvili (penalty missed)	3 – 2	(penalty scored) Virgil Marşavela; (penalty scored) Ara E. Khachatryan; (penalty missed) David Khanishvili; (penalty missed) Teofilo Leandro; (penalty missed) Arsen Avetisyan

Olympic Stadium, Ashgabat

2009-02-27
18:00

FC Aşgabat (Turkmenistan)	0 - 1	(Turkmenistan) HTTU Aşgabat
		89' Berdi Şamyradow

Olympic Stadium, Ashgabat

== Third-place play-off ==
2009-02-28
14:00

FC Gandzasar (Armenia)	1 - 2	(Turkmenistan) FC Aşgabat
Da Silva 56'		34' Gahrymanberdi Çoňkaýew; 80' Vyacheslav Krendelev

Olympic Stadium, Ashgabat

== Final ==
2009-02-28
17:00

Skonto Rīga (Latvia)	0 - 1	(Turkmenistan) HTTU Aşgabat
		66' Azat Garajaýew

Olympic Stadium, Ashgabat
Attendance: 25.000
Referee: (Turkmenistan) Çarymyrat Gurbanow

== Top scorers ==
Notes

- FC Hemmat is the only team at this tournament players of which were unable to score a single goal.

#	Scorer	Goals (Pen.)	Team
1	(Turkmenistan) Pirmyrat Gazakow	2	HTTU Aşgabat
=	(Latvia) Igors Kozlovs	2	Skonto Rīga
=	(Latvia) Andrejs Perepļotkins	2	Skonto Rīga
=	(Turkmenistan) Ruslan Mingazow	2	FC Aşgabat
=	(Tajikistan) Mansurjon Hakimov	2	FC Parvoz
=	(Bahrain) Abdullah Naser Mohamed	2	Bahrain Youth Team
=	(Turkmenistan) Berdi Şamyradow	2	HTTU Aşgabat
=	(Latvia) Aleksandrs Fertovs	2	Skonto Rīga
=	(Turkmenistan) Azat Garajaýew	2	HTTU Aşgabat
=	(Turkmenistan) Gahrymanberdi Çoňkaýew	2	FC Aşgabat
