= Guntis Indriksons =

Latvian businessperson

- Born: 18 December 1955 (age 70); Vilpulka, Latvian SSR, Soviet Union
- Citizenship: Latvia
- Occupation: Entrepreneur

Guntis Indriksons (born 18 December 1955 in Vilpulka) is a Latvian entrepreneur and football official. He is the founder and former owner of the Skonto group of companies.

In 1983, he completed his studies at the Faculty of Law of Latvian State University. Between 1981 and 1990, according to the Latvian Encyclopaedia, he worked for the KGB in Moscow and Riga. In 1990, Indriksons founded the Skonto group of companies and was its general director until 2011. From 1991 to 2012, he was president of Skonto FC.

In 1996, he became president of the Latvian Football Federation and held this position until 27 April 2018.
