= Vadims Ļašenko =

Latvian football administrator

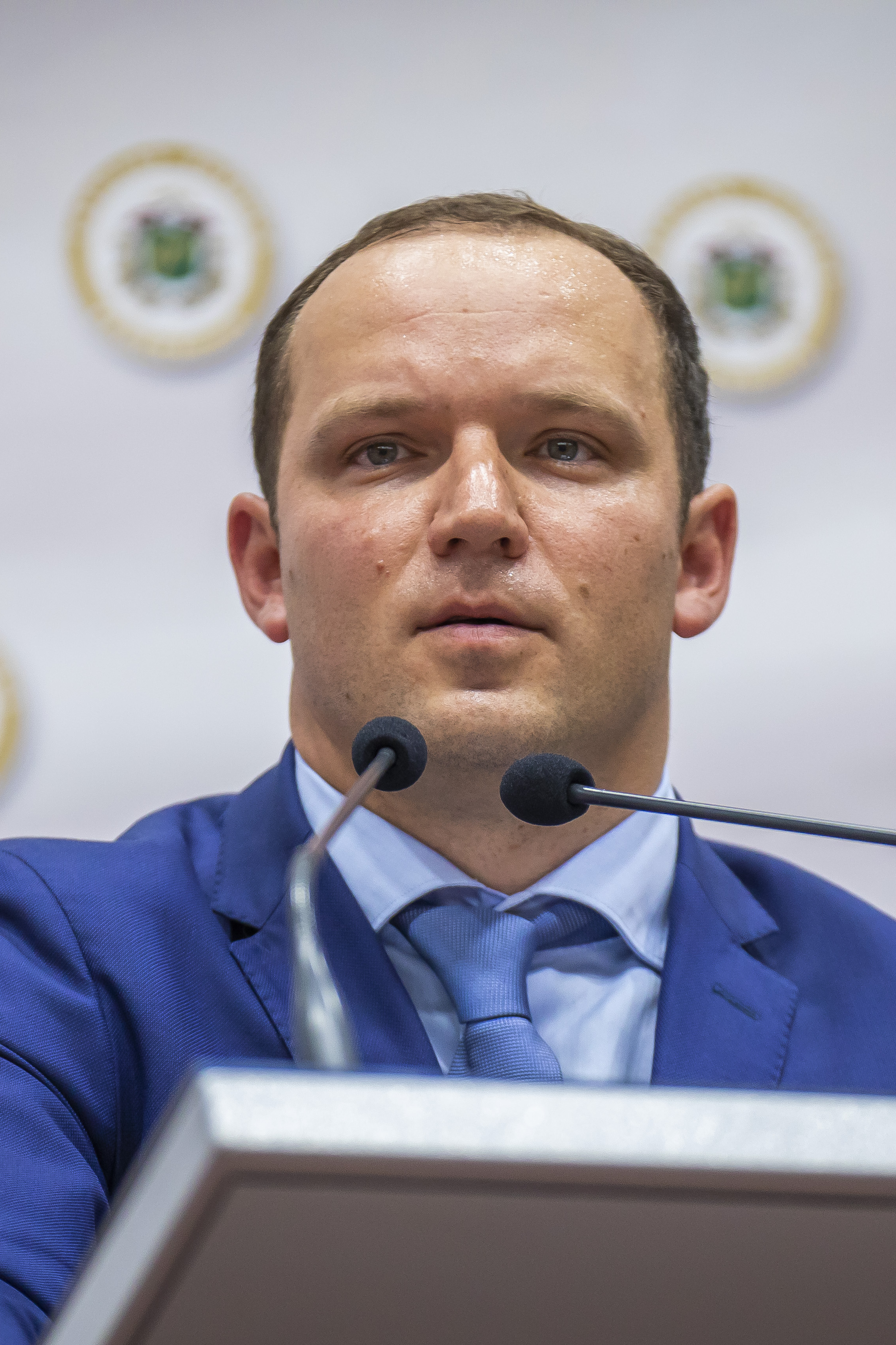
- Ļašenko in 2018

5th President of LFF
- Incumbent
- Assumed office 3 July 2020
- Preceded by: Kaspars Gorkšs

Personal details
- Born: 7 April 1984 (age 42) Riga, Latvia
- Education: RISEBA
- Occupation: businessman

Vadims Ļašenko (born 7 April 1984) is a Latvian football administrator. Former Latvia national futsal team captain and referee. Currently he is a president of Latvian Football Federation and UEFA chair of the indoor football and beach football committee.

== Biography ==
He started his career in FK Ranto and FK Rīga, however, more successful he was in Futsal, where he continued his future career. From 2002 till 2013 he was a vice-president and team captain of the futsal club FK Nikars in which he won the title of Latvian champion seven times. He played 42 matches in Latvia national futsal team.

Four years he also worked as a referee assistant in Latvian football for different leagues. From 2015 till 2017 he was a vice-president and board member of the Latvian Higher League club FK RFS.

When running for the position of LFF president in 2018, he left FK RFS. Since 2017, he has also been a UEFA delegate. At the 2018 LFF congress, he conceded to Kaspars Gorkšs in the presidential election, but in the 2020 election he convincingly won, beating the other candidate, politician Sandis Ģirģens.

In July 2023, he was elected to the UEFA Indoor Football and Beach Football Committee, which is responsible for the development of these sports on the continent. This was the first time in history that someone from Latvia was the chairman of a UEFA committee.

== Personal life ==
Ļašenko is married to his wife Ella and is a father of two kids.
