= Ryan Ashford =

English footballer

Personal information
- Full name: Ryan Marc Ashford
- Date of birth: 13 October 1981 (age 45)
- Place of birth: Honiton, Devon, England
- Height: 5 ft 11 in (1.80 m)
- Position: Defender

Youth career
- 1996–2000: Southampton

Senior career*
Years	Team	Apps	(Gls)
2000–2002	Southampton	0	(0)
2002	Torquay United	2	(1)
2002–2003	Weymouth	20	(0)
2003–2006	Eastleigh	140	(19)
2006–2011	Sholing	106	(26)
2011–2013	Lymington Town	15	(2)
Total		283	(48)
- * Club domestic league appearances and goals

Ryan Marc Ashford (born 13 October 1981) is an English former professional footballer. He was born in Honiton, Devon.

Ashford began his career as a trainee at Southampton, making his first team debut for the Saints in a League Cup game on 26 September 2000 against Mansfield Town. He did not last the first 45 minutes as he received a knock and was stretchered from the field. Saints manager Glenn Hoddle was quoted as being an admirer of Ashford's "sweet left peg", but in March 2002, having failed to make another first team appearance, Ashford signed for Torquay United on non-contract terms.

He played twice for Torquay the following month, coming on as a late substitute for Lee Canoville in the 3–0 win at home to Rochdale and starting the game at home to Halifax Town, which Torquay lost 4–2, despite Ashford scoring the opening goal.

Ashford was released by Torquay at the end of the season and signed for Weymouth on 16 August 2002, moving on to Eastleigh the following June.

He remained with Eastleigh until October 2006 when he was released and joined VT F.C.
