= Adam Wallace =

English footballer (born 1981)

Personal information
- Full name: Adam Wallace
- Date of birth: 5 October 1981 (age 45)
- Place of birth: Ashford, England
- Position: Forward

Youth career
- 199?–2002: Southampton

Senior career*
Years	Team	Apps	(Gls)
2002	Salisbury City	?	(?)
2002	Southend United	2	(0)
2002–2005	Salisbury City	?	(?)
2005	Basingstoke Town	6	(1)
2005–2006	Windsor & Eton	39	(12)
2006–200?	Slough Town	13	(2)
200?–200?	Fleet Town	?	(?)
2008–200?	Windsor & Eton	?	(?)
- * Club domestic league appearances and goals

Adam Wallace (born 5 October 1981) is an English semi-professional footballer who plays as a forward. He played in the Football League with Southend United, before dropping into non-League football.

== Career ==
Wallace started his football career at Southampton since the age of 13, before joining Salisbury City in 2002. After a short stint at Salisbury, he then joined Southend United along with Andrew Marfell, Rio Alderton and Chris Dorrian on trial playing in a Football Combination reserve match against Luton Town, in which he scored a goal and hit the post in March 2002. Wallace went on to sign for Southend in April along with Alderton, making his debut against Plymouth Argyle on 6 April in a 0–0 away draw in the Third Division, replacing Barrington Belgrave as a substitute in the 65th minute. He went on to make only one more appearance for Southend in the 2–0 home defeat to Shrewsbury Town on 13 April, when he came on as a substitute for Leon Johnson in the 55th minute.

He rejoined Salisbury in August 2002, where he spent the following two seasons scoring 54 goals in 93 appearances for the club. Towards the end of the 2001–02 season, Wallace signed for Conference South side Basingstoke Town. He was released at the end of the season after making six appearances, scoring once against Redbridge in the 3–0 win on 2 April 2005. In May 2005, Wallace signed for Southern Football League Division One South & West club Windsor & Eton. He went on to make 39 appearances in the league scoring 12 goals, and 40 appearances with 14 goals in total. Wallace went on to join Slough Town and Fleet Town before rejoining Windsor & Eton in September 2008.

In late 2022, Adam signed for Absolute Sales Veterans team in Paignton.
