= Paul Ashworth =

English footballer and manager

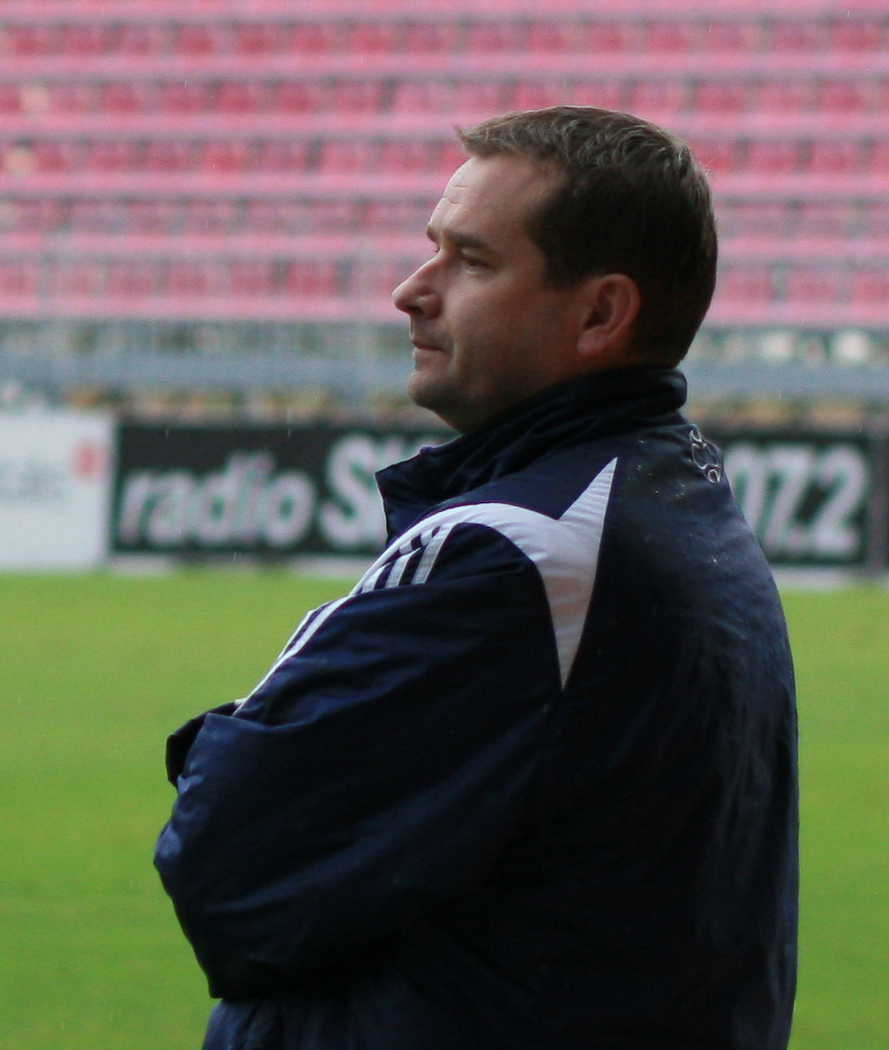
- Ashworth in 2008

Personal information
- Full name: Paul Anthony Ashworth
- Date of birth: 29 September 1969 (age 57)
- Place of birth: Norwich, Norfolk, England

Youth career
- Years: Team
- Norwich City

Managerial career
- 2001–2003: Ventspils
- 2004: Riga
- 2005: Rostov (caretaker)
- 2005–2009: Skonto Riga
- 2015: Sunshine Stars
- 2015–2018: Ventspils
- 2020: Astana (caretaker)

Paul Anthony Ashworth (born 29 September 1969) is an English football manager who was most recently technical director of Russian Premier League club Spartak Moscow.

Ashworth had previously played at youth level for Norwich City before setting up PASS Soccer Schools. He later worked for Cambridge United and Peterborough United before moving to Latvia where he managed Ventspils, Riga and Skonto Riga as well as taking over at Russian side Rostov as sporting director.

Ashworth worked as a technical director for Kwara Football Academy in Nigeria from 2010 to 2014. He was manager and technical director of Sunshine Stars, a Nigerian Premier League team for six months, before moving back to Latvia as head coach of Ventspils.

== Playing career ==
Ashworth came through the youth system at Norwich City, where he played for the side at schoolboy level. He did not make the step up to the first team, though, but began to coach the youth teams at the club.

== Youth coaching career ==
=== Soccer Schools ===
While Ashworth was at Carrow Road, he set up his own company, PASS Soccer Schools.

=== Cambridge United ===
In 1992, Cambridge United offered Ashworth a role as youth development officer at the club's Abbey Stadium.

== Managerial career ==
=== Ventspils ===
In a league dominated by multi-championship winning side Skonto Riga, Ashworth secured two consecutive runners-up finishes, a Latvian Cup triumph and steered his squad into the UEFA Cup for the first time. In subsequent seasons, they also played Finnish side HJK Helsinki and Swiss club Lugano, winning their first European match.

=== Rostov ===
Having previously been unsuccessfully interviewed for the vacant managers position at Russian Premier League club Rostov, Ashworth was approached by the president of the club offering him the position of Sporting Director. He accepted the role and was responsible for all of the football side of the club such as youth policy, transfer policy, dealing with visas and international players, research and building of new training facilities as well as liaison with the manager on first team matters. After taking charge temporarily for two matches, he became the first Englishman ever to coach in the Russian Premier League.

=== Skonto Riga ===
It was during this period that he self titled himself as "The Mourinho of Latvia", simply due to not being good enough to play professionally in senior football.

=== Kwara Football Academy ===
In 2009, Ashworth became technical director of the Kwara Football Academy in Ilorin, Nigeria. The residential academy provides football training and education for young people aged 13 to 21. During his tenure, Ashworth oversaw a coaching team of nine and more than 80 full-time staff, as well as the development of training facilities and programmes.[1]

=== Astana ===
On 14 January 2019, Astana announced the appointment of Ashworth as their new executive director. Following the dismissal of manager Michal Bílek on 26 August 2020, Ashworth was appointed acting head-coach of Astana. Ashworth left his role as caretaker manager and executive director by mutual consent on 7 October 2020.

=== Managerial statistics ===
As of 27 August 2021

Team	From	To	Record				
Team	From	To	G	W	D	L	Win %
Ventspils	1 January 2001	9 July 2003	76	53	7	16	69.74
Rīga	1 January 2004	31 December 2004	28	6	9	13	21.43
Rostov (Caretaker)	23 April 2005	2 May 2005	2	0	1	1	0.00
Ventspils	14 September 2015	16 January 2018	74	38	17	19	51.35
Astana (Caretaker)	27 August 2020	7 October 2020	8	3	2	3	37.50
Total			188	100	36	52	53.19
