= Latvian Football Federation =

Sports governing body

UEFA
- Short name: LFF
- Founded: 19 June 1921; 104 years ago in Riga
- Headquarters: Riga
- FIFA affiliation: 1922–1940; 1992–present
- UEFA affiliation: 1992–present
- President: Vadims Ļašenko
- General Secretary: Arturs Gaidels
- Website: www.lff.lv

The Latvian Football Federation (Latvian: Latvijas Futbola federācija lv; LFF [ˌelːefˈefː]) is the governing body of football in Latvia with its headquarters located in the Rimi Sports Centre in Riga. Its activities include the organizing of the Latvian football championship (Optibet Virslīga), the Latvian First League, the Latvian Second League, as well as lower league championships and the Latvian Football Cup. The federation also manages the Latvia national football team and Latvia women's national football team.

== 1918—1940 ==
The LFF was established on 19 June 1921 as the Latvian Football Union (Latvian: Latvijas Futbola savienība) and was active until 1940 when it was closed down after the Soviet occupation of Latvia. A British national Harold Trevenen Hall was appointed the first chairman of the Latvian Football Union. In 1922, the Latvian Championship organized by Latvian Football Union consisted of 12 associations, 22 teams and 479 football players. A year earlier, rules of football were published in Latvian for the first time and in May 1923 Latvia was accepted into FIFA. Herberts Baumanis was the representative of Latvia in the acceptance ceremony in France. In 1925, the Latvian Football Union established football unions in the regions of country and in 1927 the Virslīga top-level competition was launched. It consisted of three of the strongest teams from Riga and a club from Liepāja while others were playing in tournaments of their regions. This system was in place up until 1940, and the number of teams in the Virslīga grew to eight. The union was formally dissolved by the Soviet occupation authorities on 11 November 1940.

== From 1990 ==
LFF renewed its operations on 19 August 1990 under its current name right after Latvia regained independence. Its membership in FIFA was restored in 1992 and in the same year it joined UEFA.

In 2015, the federation had a staff of 47 people, with the top post being the President of the LFF. Daily affairs of the LFF are managed by its General Secretary, Edgars Pukinsks.

On 27 April 2018, the long-time LFF president Guntis Indriksons left his position after 22 years in office, becoming Honorary President of the LFF in an advisory role. The General Secretary since 1993, Jānis Mežeckis, also resigned in May and was replaced by Pukinsks. Former national team captain Kaspars Gorkšs was elected as his successor by the member organizations of the federation.

On 17 October 2019, after a continuing streak of poor international results by the Latvia national team and claims about poor management of the federation from a fraction of its members, an emergency congress with the goal of removing Gorkšs from the post was held, with a 65-vote majority needed for the motion to pass. In a close vote of 67 to 60 with two abstentions, Gorkšs was voted out of office. Earlier in 2019, there were a number of calls by a group of LFF members to remove Gorkšs from office, yet they all were unsuccessful. According to LFF rules, the next election of the body's president was scheduled to take place in 2020.

Vadims Ļašenko was elected president of the Latvian Football Federation during the federation's congress on 3 July 2020. 96 delegates to the congress voted for Ļašenko, the president of the Latvian Futsal Association, while the other candidate, Interior Minister Sandis Ģirģens (KPV LV) was supported by 26 delegates. Six delegates abstained from voting.

== Chairmen/Presidents of the Federation ==
- Vladimirs Ļeskovs (1990–1995)
- Modris Supe (1995–1996)
- Guntis Indriksons (1996–2018)
- Kaspars Gorkšs (2018–2019)
- vacant (2019–2020; First Vice President Artūrs Zakreševskis as interim head)
- Vadims Ļašenko (since 2020)
