= Aleksandrs Stankus =

Latvian footballer

Aleksandrs Stankus (13 July 1913 – 23 December 1944) was a Latvian footballer who played for Olimpija Liepāja and Latvia national team between 1930 and 1937.

== Biography ==
Stankus had two big passions in his life - football and ballet. In both of these fields he was quite respected in Liepāja although he never was a really big star in either ballet or football. In football, he made his debut with Olimpija at the age of 18 by scoring goals in international friendlies against the champions of East Prussia and Estonia.

In the first years he played as a central midfielder but later mostly as a right wing forward. He was never as popular as his teammates in attack - Ludvigs Dudaņecs, Voldemārs Žins or Fricis Dambrēvics although in one season he was the second best goalscorer of his club. In the first half of 1930s Stankus became a regular player with the Latvia national football team for which he made in total 17 appearances. Meanwhile, in 11 seasons with Olimpija Liepāja he won 5 Latvian Higher League titles (only the really big stars of Olimpija - Kārlis Tīls, Harijs Lazdiņš and Fricis Laumanis held more titles than him), he was also a three-time winner of the Riga Football Cup.

Stankus was one of the six Olimpija club veterans that left the club in 1936. For two more seasons he played with ASK Riga and completely retired from football in 1938.

== Personal life and death ==
Stankus was born at Aizpute, Latvia. During German occupation of Latvia in World War II, Stankus served in the Latvian Legion of the Waffen-SS. Stankus was presumably killed in battle in Džūkste in December 1944, although he was only declared as missing.
