= 1942 Latvian Higher League =

Latvian football league season for the highest division

Latvian Higher League
- Season: 1942
- Champions: ASK Riga
- Relegated: Daugavieši
- Matches: 15
- Goals: 61 (4.07 per match)
- Top goalscorer: Eduards Freimanis

In 1942, under the German occupation of Latvia during World War II, most pre-war Latvian football clubs were restored (with the exception of ethnic minorities' sides like Russian RKSB Riga, Jewish Hakoah Riga etc.). The championship (Latvijas futbola Virslīga) was divided in two phases - the preliminary phase to determine the four strongest sides in Riga and two in the province, and the main phase where these six teams would settle among them positions in the Latvian Higher League.

The four clubs to finish at the top of the Riga tournament were (from first to fourth) Daugavieši, RSK Rīga (later in the year renamed back to ASK Rīga), LDzB Rīga and RFK. From the province an automatic qualification was granted to Olimpija Liepāja, whilst Jelgavas Sporta biedrība ('Jelgava Sports Society') took the second spot.

Three sides were considered main contenders for the league title - Daugavieši, ASK and Olimpija, whilst RFK had an outside chance for it. After the first two match days results corresponded to the pre-season predictions: Daugavieši and ASK were on top of the table with 3 points, thus showing their ambitions to win the league. However, in the following three match days their results went in opposite directions - ASK got 3 victories, meanwhile Daugavieši suffered three defeats. The collapse of the Riga qualification tournament winners was mainly connected with loss of several key players during the season and before it. Alfons Jēgers, one of the most talented Latvian forwards of the 1940s, was arrested by the German officials and sent to the Stutthof concentration camp, another key forward Ludvigs Putniņš decided to return to his previous club - ASK, several players suffered injuries and a result of it all Daugavieši finished last in the league and had to participate in a play-off match against Rīgas Vilki for the right to play in the higher league in the following season. By losing that game also, Daugavieši faced relegation.

Meanwhile, in the title race there was no competition for ASK Riga which won four out of five league games.

== Final classification ==
Pos	Team	Pld	W	D	L	GF	GA	GD	Pts
1	ASK Riga (C)	5	4	1	0	21	7	+14	9
2	Olimpija Liepāja	5	2	2	1	12	7	+5	6
3	RFK	5	1	2	2	3	5	−2	4
4	Jelgavas SB	5	2	0	3	9	15	−6	4
5	LDzB Riga	4	2	0	2	9	19	−10	4
6	Daugavieši	5	1	1	3	7	8	−1	3

(C) Champions

== Top goalscorers ==
6 goals

- (Latvia) Eduards Freimanis (Daugavieši)

5 goals

- (Latvia) Arnolds Puriņš (ASK)

4 goals

- (Latvia) Riekstiņš (ASK)
- (Latvia) Aleksandrs Vanags (ASK)
- (Latvia) Roberts Heiblihs (Olimpija Liepāja)

3 goals

- (Latvia) Ansons (Jelgavas Sporta biedrība)
- (Latvia) Vaclavs Borduško (ASK)
- (Latvia) Ēriks Koņeckis (ASK)

== References and sources ==
- Sporta pasaule sports magazine, Rīga, 1942
