= 1935 Latvian Higher League =

Latvian football league season for the highest division

Latvian Higher League
- Season: 1935

Statistics of Latvian Higher League in the 1935 season.

== Overview ==
It was contested by 8 teams, and RFK won the championship.

== League standings ==
Pos	Team	Pld	W	D	L	GF	GA	GD	Pts
1	RFK	14	11	2	1	36	9	+27	24
2	Olimpija	14	7	4	3	29	20	+9	18
3	US	14	7	2	5	29	31	−2	16
4	Riga Wanderer	14	6	2	6	33	24	+9	14
5	Hakoah	14	6	2	6	28	25	+3	14
6	ASK	14	4	3	7	17	20	−3	11
7	JKS	14	4	3	7	21	34	−13	11
8	Union	14	1	2	11	12	42	−30	4

Source: rsssf.com
