= List of football clubs in Latvia =

This is a list of football clubs in Latvia as of the 2024 season.

As of 2024, 79 teams compete in the Latvian football league system: 10 in Virslīga, 14 in 1.līga, 16 in 2.līga, and 39 in 3.līga.

== Virslīga ==
- BFC Daugavpils (Daugavpils)
- FK Auda (Ķekava)
- FS Jelgava (Jelgava)
- FK Liepāja (Liepāja)
- FK Metta (Rīga)
- FK RFS (Riga)
- Grobiņas SC/LFS (Grobiņa)
- FK Tukums 2000/Telms (Tukums)
- Riga FC (Rīga)
- Valmiera FC (Valmiera)

== 1. līga ==
- AFA Olaine (Olaine)
- Mārupes SC (Mārupe)
- FK RFS-2 (Riga)
- FK Tukums 2000-2/TSS (Tukums)
- FK Smiltene/BJSS (Smiltene)
- JFK Ventspils (Ventspils)
- Rēzekne (Rēzekne)
- JDFS Alberts (Rīga)
- Leevon PPK (Rīga)
- Riga FC-2 (Riga)
- Ogre United (Ogre)
- Skanstes SK (Riga)
- SK Super Nova (Salaspils)
- Valmiera FC-2 (Valmiera)

== 2. līga ==
=== Second League West ===
- FK Aliance (Riga)
- FK Dinamo Riga (Riga)
- FK Beitar/Riga Mariners (Riga)
- Augšdaugavas NSS (Ilūkste)
- FK Staiceles Bebri (Staicele)
- JDFS Alberts-2 (Riga)
- SK Super Nova-2 (Salaspils)
- FC Gauja (Valmiera)

=== Second League East ===
- JFC Viola (Jelgava)
- FK Ķekava/Auda (Ķegums)
- FK Limbaži (Limbaži)
- Dienvidkurzemes SS (Grobiņa)
- FK Salaspils (Salaspils)
- FK Karosta (Liepāja)
- FK Union (Riga)
- FS Jelgava-2 (Jelgava)

== 3. līga ==
=== Third League Centre ===
- ASK Kadaga/Ostas SK (Ādaži)
- Athletic Club Jules Verne (Riga)
- Rīgas Futbola Skola (Riga)
- AFA Olaine-2 (Olaine)
- JFK Daugava/Salaspils FA (Salaspils)
- JRFPC Upesciema Warriors (Upesciems)
- Riga United (Riga)
- FK RSU (Riga)
- SK Babīte (Babīte)

=== Third League West ===
- Bauskas BJSS/Mēmele (Bauska)
- Kuldīgas FS/Goldingen United (Kuldīga)
- FK Dobele Allegro (Dobele)
- FK Iecava (Iecava)
- FC Talsi/NSS (Talsi)
- FK Tukums 2000-3 (Tukums)
- Liepājas FS (Liepāja)
- Saldus NSS/Leevon-2 (Saldus)
- FK Kauguri (Jūrmala)

=== Third League North ===
North East

- FK Cēsis (Cēsis)
- FK Pļaviņas DM (Pļaviņas)
- FK Valka (Valka)
- FK Veina/Aizkraukles Novads (Aizkraukle)
- FC Madona/BJSS (Madona)
- Gulbenes BJSS (Gulbene)
- Sports United/Cēsis (Cēsis)

North West

- Ogre United-2 (Ogre)
- Futbola Parks Academy (Riga)
- FK Sigulda (Sigulda)
- FK Traktors (Riga)
- FK Lielupe (Jūrmala)
- FK Alberts (Salaspils)
- FK Ādaži (Ādaži)

=== Third League East ===
- Balvi (Balvi)
- FK Līvāni (Līvāni)
- FK Ludza (Ludza)
- Preiļu BJSS (Preiļi)
- Rēzeknes NSS/FK Saules Puikas (Rēzekne)
- FK Kalupe (Kalupe)
- FK Krāslava/Daugavpils-2 (Krāslava)

== Defunct or inactive ==
- FK Eurobaltija (Riga)
- FC Noah Jurmala (Jūrmala)
- FK Dinamo-Rīnuži/LASD (Riga)
- FK Jēkabpils/JSC (Jēkabpils)
- FK Latvijas finieris (Riga)
- FK Ogre (Ogre)
- FK Zibens/Zemessardze (Ilūkste)
- JFK Saldus (Saldus)
- Nordeka LFKA
- SFK Varavīksne (Liepāja)
- Skonto FC (Riga)

== See also ==
- Latvian football league system
- Latvian Higher League
- List of football teams
