= 1934 Latvian Higher League =

Latvian football league season for the highest division

Latvian Higher League
- Season: 1934

Statistics of Latvian Higher League in the 1934 season.

== Overview ==
It was contested by 8 teams, and RFK won the championship.

== League standings ==
Pos	Team	Pld	W	D	L	GF	GA	GD	Pts
1	RFK	14	11	2	1	40	9	+31	24
2	Riga Wanderer	14	9	0	5	30	14	+16	18
3	ASK Rīga	14	8	1	5	22	15	+7	17
4	Olimpija	14	7	2	5	31	7	+24	16
5	Union	14	6	1	7	23	43	−20	13
6	Hakoah	14	5	2	7	19	31	−12	12
7	JKS	14	5	0	9	20	39	−19	10
8	Liepājas ASK	14	1	0	13	17	44	−27	2

Source: rsssf.com
