= 1930 Latvian Higher League =

Latvian football league season for the highest division

Latvian Higher League
- Season: 1930

Statistics of Latvian Higher League in the 1930 season.

== Overview ==
It was contested by 7 teams, and RFK won the championship.

== League standings ==
Pos	Team	Pld	W	D	L	GF	GA	GD	Pts
1	RFK	12	8	3	1	38	12	+26	19
2	Olimpija	12	8	1	3	29	12	+17	17
3	Riga Wanderer	12	6	2	4	18	15	+3	14
4	Union	12	3	5	4	32	33	−1	11
5	ASK	12	5	1	6	25	21	+4	11
6	Amatieris	12	2	3	7	13	35	−22	7
7	LSB	12	2	1	9	10	37	−27	5

Source: rsssf.com
