= 1933 Latvian Higher League =

Latvian football league season for the highest division

Latvian Higher League
- Season: 1933

Statistics of Latvian Higher League in the 1933 season.

== Overview ==
It was contested by 8 teams, and Olimpija won the championship.

== League standings ==
Pos	Team	Pld	W	D	L	GF	GA	GD	Pts
1	Olimpija	14	10	2	2	37	17	+20	22
2	RFK	14	9	2	3	38	21	+17	20
3	ASK	14	8	1	5	32	17	+15	17
4	Riga Wanderer	14	8	1	5	23	20	+3	17
5	JKS	14	5	1	8	21	23	−2	11
6	Union	14	4	3	7	24	33	−9	11
7	Hakoah	14	3	1	10	17	31	−14	7
8	Amatieris	14	3	1	10	16	46	−30	7

Source: rsssf.com
