= Harijs Fogelis =

Latvian footballer and bandy player

Harijs Fogelis was a Latvian footballer who played as a forward.

== Biography ==
Fogelis' first season in senior football came in 1925 when he played with LSB Riga as it finished third in the top Riga football league. After two years with LSB Fogelis moved to the flagman of Riga football RFK. With RFK he played just one season after which he moved to the newly founded Riga Vanderer along several much more popular RFK footballers, such as Arvīds Jurgens, Voldemārs Plade and Česlavs Stančiks, and over two seasons the new club earned promotion to the Latvian Higher League. Fogelis played with Vanderer until 1932, then he joined another Riga club - Union Riga together with two other leading Vanderer footballers - Hermanis Jēnihs and Ferdinands Neibergs. Fogelis played two years with Union and was one of the leaders of the side, however before the 1935 season he returned to Riga Vanderer (replacing Alberts Šeibelis who had left the club) with which he won the Riga Football Cup in 1936 and retired from football after the season.

Between 1925 and 1934 Fogelis capped 8 international appearances for Latvia national football team. In 1928 he was a member of the Latvia team that won the first ever Baltic Cup tournament. Fogels was also a two-time champion of Latvia in ice hockey with the hockey team of Union (in 1932 and 1933), in addition he also played bandy for the Latvia national team.
