= 1931 Latvian Higher League =

Latvian football league season for the highest division

Latvian Higher League
- Season: 1931

The 1931 football season was the 5th season of the Latvian Virsliga. The reigning champions - Rīgas FK managed to retain their title in a tight battle against Olimpija Liepāja. The title was decided in the last match between Rīgas FK and LSB Rīga in which the former won 4-0, if Rīgas FK wouldn't have won there would have been either a golden match or Olimpija would be crowned champions. Rīgas FK had previously fallen behind in the title race after an unexpected defeat against Cēsu sporta biedrība however Olimpija also struggled in the latter part of the season. The Cēsis club which was the league debutant was relegated after having lost 12 of its 14 matches in Virsliga, and the win against the champion club Rīgas FK was its only victory of the season. Moreover, as of 2008, it was the only season for a club from Cēsis to play in the Latvian top football league.

== Final classification ==
Pos	Team	Pld	W	D	L	GF	GA	GD	Pts
1	Rīgas FK (C)	14	10	1	3	44	19	+25	21
2	Olimpija Liepāja	14	9	2	3	38	14	+24	20
3	Union Riga	14	6	3	5	30	30	0	15
4	Riga Wanderer	14	6	3	5	22	25	−3	15
5	LSB Rīga	14	5	4	5	19	22	−3	14
6	Amatieris Rīga	14	4	5	5	11	19	−8	13
7	ASK Rīga	14	5	1	8	33	38	−5	11
8	Cēsu Sporta biedrība	14	1	1	12	15	45	−30	3

(C) Champions

== References and sources ==
- Latvijas futbola vēsture by Miķelis Rubenis, Rīga, 2001
