= 1932 Latvian Higher League =

Latvian football league season for the highest division

Latvian Higher League
- Season: 1932

Statistics of Latvian Higher League in the 1932 season.

== Overview ==
It was contested by 8 teams, and ASK won the championship.

== League standings ==
Pos	Team	Pld	W	D	L	GF	GA	GD	Pts
1	ASK	14	8	4	2	37	15	+22	20
1	Riga Wanderer	14	9	2	3	24	17	+7	20
3	RFK	14	9	1	4	45	21	+24	19
4	Olimpija	14	8	1	5	38	16	+22	17
5	JKS	14	5	1	8	20	25	−5	11
6	Union	14	4	2	8	16	32	−16	10
7	Amatieris	14	4	0	10	14	42	−28	8
8	LSB Rīga	14	2	3	9	14	40	−26	7

Source: rsssf.com
- ASK 3-1 Riga Wanderer
