= Harijs =

- Gender: Male
- Name day: 13 January

Origin
- Region of origin: Latvia

Other names
- Related names: Haralds

Harijs is a Latvian masculine given name and may refer to:

- Harijs Fogelis (1906–1989), a Latvian football forward
- Harijs Lazdiņš (1910–1988), a Latvian football goalkeeper
- Harijs Mellups (1927–1950), a Latvian football and ice hockey player
- Harijs Pikols (1903–198?), a Latvian footballer, Olimpija Liepāja football club founder
- Harijs Vītoliņš (born 1968), a Latvian professional ice hockey centre
