= 1936 Latvian Higher League =

Latvian football league season for the highest division

Latvian Higher League
- Season: 1936–37

Statistics of Latvian Higher League in the 1936 season.

== Overview ==
It was contested by 8 teams, and Olimpija won the championship.

== League standings ==
Pos	Team	Pld	W	D	L	GF	GA	GD	Pts
1	Olimpija	14	12	2	0	37	10	+27	26
2	ASK	14	10	3	1	35	12	+23	23
3	RFK	14	9	1	4	30	20	+10	19
4	V Kuze	14	4	4	6	19	24	−5	12
5	Hakoah	14	4	3	7	21	24	−3	11
6	US	14	3	3	8	21	33	−12	9
7	Riga Wanderer	14	3	2	9	26	25	+1	8
8	JKS	14	2	0	12	13	54	−41	4

Source: rsssf.com
