= 1937–38 Latvian Higher League =

Latvian football league season for the highest division

Latvian Higher League
- Season: 1937–38

Statistics of Latvian Higher League in the 1937–38 season.

== Overview ==
It was contested by 7 teams, and Olimpija won the championship.

== League standings ==
Pos	Team	Pld	W	D	L	GF	GA	GD	Pts
1	Olimpija	12	10	1	1	41	9	+32	21
2	RFK	12	9	0	3	33	12	+21	18
3	ASK	12	6	1	5	33	25	+8	13
4	Riga Wanderer	12	4	4	4	31	15	+16	12
5	Hakoah	12	4	2	6	17	27	−10	10
6	Universitātes Sports	12	4	2	6	19	38	−19	10
7	16 JAPSK	12	0	0	12	14	62	−48	0

Source: rsssf.com
