= Aleksandrs Ābrams =

Latvian footballer

Personal information
- Date of birth: 30 January 1904
- Date of death: 3 February 1958 (aged 54)
- Position: Forward

Senior career*
| Years | Team | Apps | (Gls) |
| 1923-1927 | Rīgas FK | | |
| 1928-1930 | Riga Vanderer | | |

International career
| 1924-1927 | Latvia national football team | 8 | |
- * Club domestic league appearances and goals

Aleksandrs Ābrams (30 January 1904 – 3 February 1958) was a Latvian football forward who used to play with Rīgas FK, the most successful Latvian football club of the 1920s and 1930s.

== Club playing career ==
The first club that Ābrams played with was Amatieris for which he played in 1923. In 1924 along with two other notable Amatieris footballers – Arkādijs Pavlovs and Arnolds Tauriņš Ābrams joined RFK as it went on to its first Latvian league title. Ābrams went on to winning two more league titles with RFK in 1925 and 1926. At the end of the 1927 season Ābrams was one of several RFK main squad footballers (together with Arvīds Jurgens, Voldemārs Plade, Česlavs Stančiks and others) to leave the team for the newly founded Riga Vanderer club which became a strong rival for RFK in the following years (RFK was usually the stronger side on field, but there was always a high tension surrounding the derby between these two sides). In 1928 RV with Ābrams as one its key players won the Riga Class B tournament to progress to Class A which it won the following year.

In 1930 Ābrams returned together with Vanderer to the top tier of Latvian football, winning the bronze medals of Virslīga. He retired from top-level football in 1931. In later years Ābrams played in football tournaments for clerks as a member of the squad of the Latvian customs office.

== National team playing career ==
Ābrams played 8 international matches for Latvia national football team in the period from 1924 to 1927, scoring two goals – in friendly matches against Estonia and Lithuania in 1924. He played for Latvia for the last time on 29 May 1927 as Latvia suffered a devastating 0–12 loss against Sweden.
