= Ādolfs Sīmanis =

Latvian footballer (1909–1979)

Personal information
- Date of birth: 11 March 1909
- Place of birth: Riga, Russian Empire
- Date of death: 10 September 1979 (aged 70)
- Position: Defender

Senior career*
Years	Team	Apps	(Gls)
1928–1940	Riga Vanderer		
1940	FK Dinamo Rīga		

International career
1932–1940	Latvia	9	(0)
- * Club domestic league appearances and goals

Ādolfs Sīmanis (11 March 1909 – 10 September 1979) was a Latvian football defender, with the longest career as a player with Riga Vanderer.

== Biography ==
Sīmanis came from the Latvian countryside and when he joined the newly founder Riga Vanderer football club, the club coach considered him too slow and to heavyweight in order to become a good footballer, however due to intensive work in training he soon became an irreplaceable member of the Vanderer side for which he already played in the club's first ever official match, alongside many footballers who had already played for Latvia national football team and had joined Vanderer leaving the 1926 champion of Latvia RFK.

Sīmanis played with Riga Vanderer from 1928 until the club's disillusion in 1940, over these years twice winning silver medals of the Latvian Higher League, winning the Riga Football Cup twice and the Latvian Cup once.

In 1932, Sīmanis made his début for the national team. In total he made 9 appearances for Latvia until 1940 and won the Baltic Cup twice over these years. The only important trophy in Latvia he never won was the Latvian league title.

When Latvian sports club were disbanded in 1940, Sīmanis joined FK Dinamo Riga. In the autumn of 1940 he had his leg broken in a match in Moscow after which there were complications and Sīmanis did not return to football again. He later moved to the United States, and died there in September 1979.
