= Jānis Bebris =

Latvian footballer and ice hockey player

Personal information
- Full name: Jānis Anatolijs Bebris
- Date of birth: 28 July 1917
- Place of birth: Rybinsk, Yaroslavl Oblast, Russia
- Date of death: 2 May 1969 (aged 51)
- Place of death: Dover, New Hampshire, US
- Position: Goalkeeper

Senior career*
Years	Team	Apps	(Gls)
1933–	Union Riga		
–1940	Riga Vilki		
1941	RDKA Riga		
1945–1947	TSV Schwaben Augsburg	53	(0)
1948–1950	RC Strasbourg	17	(0)

International career
1935–	Latvia	21	(0)
- * Club domestic league appearances and goals

Jānis Anatolijs Bebris (28 July 1917 – 2 May 1969) was a Latvian footballer and ice hockey player. He was the main goalkeeper of Latvia national football team in the closing years of the 1930s, and represented Latvia at the 1936 Winter Olympics. After World War II, Bebris played in West Germany and France.

== Biography ==
Bebris started playing football at the age of 16. Because of his then fragile body, he was immediately assigned the post of the goalkeeper. Playing with Union Riga Bebris soon attracted the attention of the national football team management, soon he moved to a stronger Riga club – Rīgas Vilki. Bebris made his début for Latvia at the age of 18 when Latvia played Lithuania in the Baltic Cup. In the following years Bebris alongside of Harijs Lazdiņš from Olimpija Liepāja was the leading goalkeeper in Latvian football. In total, he made 21 international appearance for Latvia.

Bebris played with RV until the club was disbanded in 1940. In 1941, he played with RDKA Riga. During the Second World War, Bebris was forced to join the Red Army; then after being captured by the Germans, he was forced to side with them.

After the war, Bebris landed in West Germany, where he played with TSV Schwaben Augsburg for two seasons in Oberliga Süd, making 53 appearances for the club in league matches.

In 1948, Bebris was transferred to France where he joined RC Strasbourg. In the years 1948 to 1949, he played 17 league matches as Strasbourg finished in a respectable 6th position in Division 1. In the next season he played just a single match as the club finished 17th and avoided relegation only thanks to liquidation of the professional club of SR Colmar. After the unsuccessful season Bebris retired from playing.

In the mid-1950s he moved to the United States where he coached football and ice hockey. He died there in 1969.
