= Voldemārs Žins =

Latvian footballer

Voldemārs Žins (born 1905, date of death unknown) was a Latvian footballer who played for Olimpija Liepāja and Latvia national football team.

== Club career ==
Žins began playing football with LNJS Liepāja in the early 1920s but he became really popular in Liepāja after he moved to Olimpija Liepāja in 1925. Olimpija was rapidly becoming one of the best football clubs in Latvia then with footballers like Rūdolfs Kronlaks, Ludvigs Dudaņecs, Kārlis Tīls and other future national team players in their top form. In 1925, Žins scored two goals as Olimpija devastated Cēsu SB 7–0 in the final match for the title of best provincial football club in Latvia.

Playing with Olimpija, Žins won the Latvian Higher League five times and became a three-time winner of the Riga Football Cup (the predecessor to the Latvian Cup).

After winning his fifth title with Olimpija in 1936 Žins retired from top-level football together with team veteran Rūdolfs Kronlaks.

Although Žins was never the leading goalscorer for Olimpija (in his later years he usually scored around five goals in a season) he was always an integral part of the Olimpija attack.

Žins came out of retirement in 1941 when he played with the Tosmare football club.

== International career ==
In 1927, Žins played for the first time for the Latvia national football team and in his very first match for it his scored three goals becoming the first Latvian footballer to have scored a hattrick in an international match.

In total between 1927 and 1932 Žins scored five goals in ten matches for Latvia and his goal tally was best among the Olimpija footballers in the national team.
