= 1928 Latvian Higher League =

Latvian football league season for the highest division

Latvian Higher League
- Season: 1928

Statistics of Latvian Higher League in the 1928 season.

== Overview ==
It was contested by 5 teams, and Olimpija won the championship.

== League standings ==
Pos	Team	Pld	W	D	L	GF	GA	GD	Pts
1	Olimpija	8	6	1	1	22	10	+12	13
2	RFK	8	3	3	2	20	16	+4	9
3	LSB	8	2	3	3	13	17	−4	7
4	Amatieris	8	2	2	4	15	18	−3	6
5	LNJS	8	2	1	5	17	26	−9	5

Source: rsssf.com
