= 1927 Latvian Higher League =

Latvian football league season for the highest division

Latvian Higher League
- Season: 1927

Statistics of Latvian Higher League in the 1927 season.

== Overview ==
It was contested by 4 teams, and Olimpija won the championship.

== League standings ==
Pos	Team	Pld	W	D	L	GF	GA	GD	Pts
1	Olimpija	6	5	0	1	12	5	+7	10
2	Rīgas FK	6	3	0	3	15	6	+9	6
3	LSB Rīga	6	2	1	3	12	9	+3	5
4	Amatieris	6	1	1	4	4	23	−19	3

Source: rsssf.com
