= 1938–39 Latvian Higher League =

Latvian football league season for the highest division

Latvian Higher League
- Season: 1938–39

Statistics of Latvian Higher League in the 1938–39 season.

== Overview ==
It was contested by 8 teams, and Olimpija won the championship.

== League standings ==
Pos	Team	Pld	W	D	L	GF	GA	GD	Pts
1	Olimpija	14	11	1	2	45	12	+33	23
2	ASK	14	10	1	3	49	16	+33	21
3	RFK	14	9	3	2	38	14	+24	21
4	Rigas Vilki	14	7	3	4	19	18	+1	17
5	RKSB	14	3	3	8	29	51	−22	9
6	Hakoah	14	2	3	9	17	26	−9	7
7	Universitātes Sports	14	3	1	10	20	43	−23	7
8	16 JAPSK	14	2	3	9	14	51	−37	7

Source: rsssf.com
