= 2022 Latvian Higher League =

Latvian Higher League
- Season: 2022
- Dates: 11 March – 12 November 2022
- Champions: Valmiera
- Relegated: Spartaks Jūrmala
- Champions League: Valmiera
- Conference League: RFS, Riga, Auda
- Matches: 180
- Goals: 536 (2.98 per match)
- All statistics correct as of 18 November 2022.

The 2022 Latvian Higher League, known as the Optibet Virslīga for sponsorship reasons, was the 31st season of top-tier football in Latvia. The season began on 11 March 2022 and ended on 12 November 2022. RFS were the defending champions after winning the league the previous season.

== Teams ==
No teams were relegated at the end of the previous season. The league consists of 7 clubs from the previous season, joined by 3 teams from 1. līga - champions FK Auda, second place Tukums and third place SK Super Nova all were promoted.

2022 Virsliga competitors
Club	Seasons in Virsliga	2021 position	Stadium	Capacity
BFC Daugavpils	9	6th	Celtnieks Stadium	1,980
FK Auda	1	1st in 1. līga	Audas stadions	520
FK Liepāja	9	3rd	Daugava Stadium (Liepāja)	4,022
Metta/LU	11	7th	Daugava Stadium (Riga)	10,461
Riga FC	7	4th	Skonto Stadium	8,087
RFS	7	1st	LNK Sporta Parks	2,300
Spartaks Jūrmala	11	5th	Slokas Stadium	2,500
SK Super Nova	1	3rd in 1. līga	Olaines stadions	2,500
FK Tukums 2000	1	2nd in 1. līga	Tukuma pilsētas stadions	1,000
Valmiera FC	5	2nd	Jānis Daliņš Stadium	1,250

=== Managers ===
Team	Coach	Appointed	In Charge
FK Auda	(Croatia) Tomislav Stipić	1 February 2022	4 years, 9 months
Daugavpils	(Latvia) Andrejs Kaļiņins	4 January 2021	5 years, 10 months
Liepāja	(Georgia (country)) Tamaz Pertia	3 June 2022	4 years, 5 months
Metta/LU	(Latvia) Andris Riherts	27 June 2022	4 years, 4 months
Riga	(Croatia) Sandro Perković	7 June 2022	4 years, 5 months
RFS	(Latvia) Viktors Morozs	13 December 2019	6 years, 11 months
Spartaks Jūrmala	(Portugal) Fabiano Flora	15 May 2022	4 years, 5 months
SK Super Nova	(Latvia) Aleksandrs Koliņko	29 June 2022	4 years, 4 months
Tukums 2000	(Latvia) Kristaps Dišlers	25 January 2021	5 years, 9 months
Valmiera FC	(Latvia) Jurģis Kalns	17 February 2022	4 years, 8 months

==== Managerial changes ====
Team	Outgoing manager	Manner of departure	Date of vacancy	Incoming manager	Date of appointment
Riga	(North Macedonia) Sashko Poposki (caretaker)	end of contract	30 November 2021	(Germany) Thorsten Fink	4 January 2022
FK Auda	(Latvia) Sergejs Kožans	mutual agreement	1 February 2022	(Croatia) Tomislav Stipić	1 February 2022
Liepāja	(Serbia) Nebojša Vignjević	signed with (Hungary) Honvéd	31 January 2022	(Belarus) Kirill Alshevsky	9 February 2022
Valmiera FC	(Georgia (country)) Tamaz Pertia	mutual agreement	14 February 2022	(Latvia) Jurģis Kalns	17 February 2022
Spartaks Jūrmala	(Poland) Przemyslaw Lagozny	mutual agreement	15 May 2022	(Portugal) Fabiano Flora	15 May 2022
Riga	(Germany) Thorsten Fink	mutual agreement	16 May 2022	(Latvia) Kristaps Blanks (caretaker)	16 May 2022
Liepāja	(Belarus) Kirill Alshevsky	mutual agreement	3 June 2022	(Georgia (country)) Tamaz Pertia	3 June 2022
SK Super Nova	(Latvia) Andrejs Lapsa	mutual agreement	4 June 2022	(Latvia) Igors Korabļovs (caretaker)	4 June 2022
Riga	(Latvia) Kristaps Blanks (caretaker)	found new coach	7 June 2022	(Croatia) Sandro Perković	7 June 2022
Metta/LU	(Latvia) Andrejs Gluščuks	mutual agreement	22 June 2022	(Latvia) Andris Riherts	27 June 2022
SK Super Nova	(Latvia) Igors Korabļovs (caretaker)	found new coach	29 June 2022	(Latvia) Aleksandrs Koliņko	29 June 2022

== League table ==
Pos	Team	Pld	W	D	L	GF	GA	GD	Pts	Qualification or relegation
1	Valmiera (C)	36	26	7	3	101	25	+76	85	Qualification for the Champions League first qualifying round
2	Riga	36	26	3	7	68	23	+45	81	Qualification for the Europa Conference League first qualifying round
3	RFS	36	22	10	4	83	32	+51	76	Qualification for the Europa Conference League first qualifying round
4	Liepāja	36	21	7	8	72	42	+30	70	
5	Auda	36	15	6	15	42	36	+6	51	Qualification for the Europa Conference League second qualifying round (Note: Auda qualified for the Europa Conference League second qualifying round by winning the 2022 Latvian Football Cup.)
6	Tukums 2000	36	11	5	20	38	69	−31	38	
7	Daugavpils	36	9	7	20	30	67	−37	34	
8	Spartaks Jūrmala (R)	36	9	4	23	37	75	−38	31	Relegation to the Latvian First League (Note: Spartaks Jūrmala were relegated after being refused a Latvian Higher League license; Super Nova were reprieved from relegation.)
9	Metta (O)	36	5	7	24	41	86	−45	22	Qualification for the Latvian Higher League play-off
10	Super Nova	36	4	8	24	24	81	−57	20	

Source: Soccerway
Rules for classification: 1) Points; 2) Head-to-head points; 3) Head-to-head goal difference; 4) Goal difference; 5) Goals scored; 6) Fair-play ranking; 7) Play-off.
(C) Champions; (O) Play-off winners; (R) Relegated

== Fixtures and results ==
=== Rounds 1–18 ===
Rounds 1–18
Home \ Away	AUD	DAU	LIE	MLU	RIG	RFS	SPJ	SNO	TUK	VAL
FK Auda		2–0	1–2	3–2	0–1	0–1	5–0	4–1	1–0	1–3
Daugavpils	1–2		0–4	2–0	0–0	1–4	2–0	1–0	2–1	0–0
Liepāja	1–1	5–1		1–0	1–0	2–3	0–0	3–1	1–2	1–3
Metta	0–1	2–3	1–5		1–4	1–1	2–0	1–1	3–2	0–3
Riga	1–0	2–0	0–1	4–0		2–0	3–0	2–0	1–0	2–1
RFS	0–0	4–0	2–2	3–1	2–1		2–0	2–0	3–0	1–3
Spartaks Jūrmala	1–2	2–0	0–2	4–2	0–4	2–3		0–0	1–3	0–2
SK Super Nova	0–0	0–0	1–3	0–1	1–4	0–3	0–3		0–1	1–5
Tukums 2000	2–1	0–1	1–4	2–2	0–1	0–10	3–0	1–1		0–3
Valmiera	2–0	1–0	3–0	1–1	3–0	4–0	4–1	1–0	3–0	

Source: soccerway
Legend: Blue = home team win; Yellow = draw; Red = away team win.

=== Rounds 19–36 ===
Rounds 19–36
Home \ Away	AUD	DAU	LIE	MLU	RIG	RFS	SPJ	SNO	TUK	VAL
FK Auda		2–0	1–2	2–1	0–2	1–1	0–1	3–0	3–0	1–1
Daugavpils	0–1		2–3	3–2	0–4	1–3	1–1	1–1	0–0	1–1
Liepāja	1–0	2–1		5–1	0–0	1–2	5–2	2–0	4–1	0–2
Metta	3–0	2–3	2–2		0–2	1–3	0–0	1–1	1–2	1–4
Riga	2–0	4–0	2–0	3–2		0–1	2–1	1–0	3–1	0–2
RFS	0–0	4–0	0–0	6–0	1–1		3–0	2–3	2–2	2–2
Spartaks Jūrmala	0–1	2–1	2–3	2–0	1–3	0–2		2–3	1–3	1–6
SK Super Nova	1–2	1–0	2–2	0–3	1–4	0–4	1–3		2–1	1–6
Tukums 2000	1–0	0–1	2–1	2–0	0–2	0–2	1–2	2–0		1–1
Valmiera	2–1	5–1	0–1	6–1	3–1	1–1	1–2	7–0	6–1	

Source: soccerway
Legend: Blue = home team win; Yellow = draw; Red = away team win.

== Statistics ==
=== Top goalscorers ===
As of 12 November 2022

Rank	Player	Club	Goals
1	(Latvia) Raimonds Krollis	Valmiera	24
2	(Serbia) Andrej Ilić	RFS	16
3	(Colombia) Camilo Mena	Valmiera	14
4	(Brazil) Luiz Hilario	Liepāja	13
5	(Senegal) Djibril Gueye	Valmiera	12
6	(Brazil) Emerson Deocleciano	RFS	11
6	(Argentina) Marcelo Torres	Riga	11
8	(Latvia) Valerijs Lizunovs	Daugavpils	10
8	(Latvia) Bruno Melnis	Metta	10
8	(Latvia) Deniss Rakels	RFS	10

=== Hat-tricks ===
Player	For	Against	Result	Date
(Colombia) Camilo Mena	Valmiera FC	Spartaks Jūrmala	4–1 (H)	18 March 2022
(Brazil) Lucas Villela	FK Liepāja	BFC Daugavpils	4–0 (A)	14 May 2022
(France) Brice Tutu	FK Auda	Spartaks Jūrmala	5–0 (H)	17 June 2022

Notes
(H) – Home team
(A) – Away team

== Latvian Higher League play-off ==
=== First leg ===
24 November 2022	Metta	2–0	Grobiņa
19:00

=== Second leg ===
27 November 2022	Grobiņa	2–3 (2–5 agg.)	Metta
13:00

== See also ==
- 2022 Latvian Football Cup
