= 1940–41 Latvian Higher League =

Latvian football league season for the highest division

Latvian Higher League
- Season: 1940–41

The 1940–41 Latvian Higher League season was a season of the Latvian Higher League. It was interrupted by the Soviet Union invasion.

== Participants ==
- Rīgas FK
- Rigas Vilki
- FK ASK
- VEF
- Hakoah
- US
- RKSB
- RAFS
- Lokomotive
- Olimpija
