= 1912 in association football =

The following are the football (soccer) events of the year 1912 throughout the world.

== Events ==
For goalkeepers handling the ball is being restricted to their boxes; previously it was their own half, where goalkeepers were permitted to handle the ball.

- Swansea City F.C. is founded.
- Novara FC is founded.

== Winners club national championship ==
- Argentina: Estudiantil Porteño, Quilmes Athletic Club
- Austria: Rapid Vienna
- Belgium: Daring CB
- England: Blackburn Rovers
- Germany: FV Holstein Kiel
- Hungary: Ferencváros
- Iceland: KR
- Italy: Pro Vercelli
- Luxembourg: US Hollerich
- Netherlands: Sparta Rotterdam
- Paraguay: Olimpia
- Romania: United Ploiești
- Scotland: For fuller coverage, see 1911-12 in Scottish football.
  - Scottish Division One – Rangers
  - Scottish Division Two – Ayr United
  - Scottish Cup – Celtic
- Sweden: Djurgårdens IF
- Uruguay: Nacional
- Greece: F.C. Goudi Athens

== International tournaments ==
- 1912 British Home Championship (February 10 – April 13, 1912)

Shared by Scotland & England

- Olympic Games in Stockholm, Sweden (June 29 – July 5, 1912)
  1. (United Kingdom) Great Britain
  2. Denmark
  3. Netherlands

== Births ==
- January 10 – Reinholds Robots, Latvian international footballer
- May 13 – Willy Jürissen, German international footballer (died 1990)
- August 3 – Otto Siffling, German international footballer (died 1939)
- September 20 – Les Dodds, English professional footballer (died 1967)
- September 21 – Mario Zatelli, French international footballer and manager (died 2004)
