= 1929 Latvian Higher League =

Latvian football league season for the highest division

Latvian Higher League
- Season: 1929

Statistics of Latvian Higher League in the 1929 season.

== Overview ==
It was contested by 5 teams, and Olimpija won the championship.

== League standings ==
Pos	Team	Pld	W	D	L	GF	GA	GD	Pts
1	Olimpija	8	6	2	0	27	9	+18	14
2	RFK	8	6	0	2	31	10	+21	12
3	Amatieris	8	3	2	3	14	14	0	8
4	ASK	8	1	2	5	14	25	−11	4
5	LSB	8	1	0	7	6	34	−28	2

Source: rsssf.com
