= Arvīds Jurgens =

Latvian sportsman

Personal information
- Full name: Karlis Arvīds Jurgens
- Date of birth: 27 May 1905
- Place of birth: Riga, Russian Empire
- Date of death: 17 December 1955 (aged 50)
- Place of death: Montreal, Quebec, Canada
- Position: Goalkeeper

Senior career*
Years	Team	Apps	(Gls)
1921–1922	JKS Riga		
1923–1927	RFK		
1928–1931	Riga Vanderer		
1932–1938	ASK Riga		

International career
1924–1935	Latvia	38	(0)
- * Club domestic league appearances and goals

Karlis Arvīds Jurgens (27 May 1905 in Riga, Russian Empire – 17 December 1955 in Montreal, Quebec) was a Latvian footballer, ice hockey, basketball and bandy player who played for Latvia national teams in all four of these sports. He was one of the best all-around Latvian sportsmen.

== Football career ==
Jurgens began playing football with JKS Riga in 1921, in 1922 winning silver medals of Riga championship with the club, although he was mainly the second choice goalkeeper behind Hermanis Saltups. When in 1923 RFK was formed, Jurgens alongside most of the JKS footballers joined the new club which proved to be the flagman of Latvian football in the years to come.

From 1924 to 1926 Jurgens won three Latvian league titles with RFK and became a two-time winner of the Riga Football Cup. From 1924 he also played for Latvia national football team for which in the years to come he played nearly two times as many matches as his main competitor Harijs Lazdiņš from Olimpija Liepāja. He was a member of the Latvian football team at the 1924 Summer Olympics.

In 1927 Jurgens became the instigator for Riga Vanderer being formed as there was an incident involving Jurgens playing for different clubs in different sports which eventually led to Jurgens being arrested before a bandy match. He joined the newly founded Vanderer (alongside several other former RFK footballers) and together with the side rose to the Latvian Higher League over just two years. For the 1928/1929 season Jurgens left Latvia and played with Austria Wien becoming the first Latvian footballer to play abroad. Before the 1932 season Jurgens left Vanderer for ASK Riga with which he won his fourth Latvian championship in 1932. He played with ASK until the 1937/38 season after which he switched solely to refereeing eventually becoming one of the best football referees in Latvia. With Latvia national football team he played his last match in 1935. Jurgens continued to perform as a football referee after World War II when he lived in Germany and Canada.

== Ice-hockey career ==
In ice hockey Jurgens won five Latvian league titles – from 1932 to 1937 when playing with ASK Riga hockey team. With Latvia national ice hockey team he played at the 1936 Winter Olympics. In ice hockey, unlike football Jurgens played as a forward and not as a goalkeeper.

== Basketball career ==
Jurgens won the Latvian basketball league title when playing with RFK in 1925.

== Honours ==
=== Football ===
- Latvian Higher League: 1924, 1925, 1926, 1932
- Riga Football Cup: 1924, 1925
- Baltic Cup: 1928

=== Ice hockey ===
- Latvian league: 1933, 1934, 1935, 1936, 1937

=== Basketball ===
- Latvian league: 1925
