= Fricis Laumanis =

Latvian footballer

Personal information
- Date of birth: 13 June 1910
- Place of birth: Liepāja, Russian Empire
- Date of death: 6 December 1981 (aged 71)
- Place of death: New Jersey, United States
- Position: Forward

Youth career
- 1925–1927: Olimpija Liepāja

Senior career*
Years	Team	Apps	(Gls)
1927–1940	Olimpija Liepāja		
1941	Dinamo Liepāja		
?–1952	Philadelphia Latvian sports club		
1953–?	United German Hungarian Club		

International career
1930–1939	Latvia	18	(0)
- * Club domestic league appearances and goals

Fricis Laumanis (13 June 1910 in Liepāja – 6 December 1981 in New Jersey) was a Latvian football defender who was the most capped footballer from Liepāja for the Latvia national football team before World War II next to Rūdolfs Kronlaks and Harijs Lazdiņš.

== Football career ==
Since his mid-teens Laumanis played with the youth squad of Olimpija Liepāja and in 1927 he first played for the senior team in a year when Olimpija won its first Latvian Higher League title, pushing out of the squad the club veteran Harijs Pikols. Laumanis played his first match in Latvian Higher League on 22 May 1927 as Olimpija beat Amatieris with 5-2 goals. However it took Laumanis some more time to establish himself as a regular first squad player for Olimpija - in 1927 and 1928 he only occasionally was selected to play for the first team, really securing his position in 1929 when Olimpija won its third title. In the 1930s Olimpija rarely played without Laumanis in the squad, in several seasons he played in all league matches for the side. Therefore, it was quite a serious loss for the club when Laumanis was disqualified for a couple of months in the autumn of 1939 in form of a disciplinary measure, however after his return on field Laumanis once again became irreplaceable for Olimpija. Laumanis played with Olimpija until it was disbanded in 1940. Playing with Olimpija Laumanis won seven Latvian league titles and became a three-time winner of the Riga Football Cup.

Laumanis played 18 international matches for Latvia between 1930 and 1939.

The last side that Fricis Laumanis played with in Latvia was Dinamo Liepāja in 1941, he did not play for Olimpija during the German occupation of Latvia in World War II. After the war Laumanis ended up in Germany which he left in 1949 for United States.

In America Laumanis continued playing football with amateur clubs winning the Pennsylvania state amateur football league title in 1952 playing with Philadelphia Latvian immigrants sports club, he also played with the United German Hungarian Club.
