= Kaiserwald Riga =

Latvian football club

Kaiserwald
- Full name: SV Kaiserwald Riga; Ķeizarmežs
- Founded: 1909
- Dissolved: after 1934
- Ground: Mežaparks Stadium (Kaiserwald Stadium), Mežaparks, Riga
Home colours	Away colours

Kaiserwald (also Ķeizarmežs) was a Latvian football club from Riga, founded in 1909. It was the third oldest club in Latvia after the Riga British Football Club and FC Union Riga, that were both founded in 1907.

Same as Union, a large part of its players consisted of Baltic Germans. It played at the Mežaparks Stadium (Kaiserwald Sports Society Stadium) in Riga, which is now the location of Mežaparks Sports Village, a training facility mostly operated by Riga FC.

== History ==
Already in 1907, the first Riga Football Club founded by British football official and the pioneer of Latvian football – Harold Trevenen Hall – requested for it to become a section of the Kaiserwald Sports Society (Kaiserwald Sportverein, established 1903). However, for uncertain reasons, the request was rejected. After the rejection, this club turned into the British Football Club (Britannia FC).

However, a new football team representing the Kaiserwald society emerged in 1909, with Kārlis Verkentīns as its first coach. In 1910, the club participated in the formation of the Riga Football League, the first football tournament in Latvia, while its youth (U-21) team won the Hatton-Hall Cup, named after Harold Hall.

Kaiserwald became the first club from Latvia that played against an international side, losing 1-9 to the Finland national Olympic football team in 1912.

From 1910 to 1915, the team played in the Riga Championship, ending up third three times, but winning once (the 1914 and 1915 tournaments were not completed due to the start of World War I). In 1912 and 1913, Kaiserwald also won the Riga Cup.

The club resumed its activities after the end of WWI and the Latvian War of Independence in 1921, partially known by the Latvianized name Ķeizarmežs. After the Latvian Football Championship in 1921 was interrupted due to an early and harsh winter with no winner, in 1922 Kaiserwald won the inaugural Latvian Football Championship, and retained the title in 1923, beating rivals such as the Riga YMCA and Rīgas FK.

In 1924, foreign nationals were banned from playing in the Latvian Championship in the course of the tournament, so Ķeizarmežs dropped out of the tournament after playing two games. The club returned in 1925, but with a weakened lineup, it ranked 5th in the Riga Championship. The following year, the club folded. In the early 1930s, there were attempts to rebuild the club, but, after playing a couple of unsuccessful seasons in the Riga Championship, the club ceased to exist for good after the 1934 season.

Players of Kaiserwald/Ķeizarmežs like Česlavs Stančiks and the four Plade brothers (Voldemārs, Kurts, Teodors and Alfrēds Plade) also played for the Latvia national team.
