= Pēteris Lauks =

Latvian footballer

Personal information
- Full name: Pēteris Lauks
- Date of birth: 10 February 1902
- Place of birth: Riga, Russian Empire
- Date of death: 15 March 1984 (aged 82)
- Place of death: Kitchener, Canada
- Position: Defender

Senior career*
Years	Team	Apps	(Gls)
1921–1933	Amatieris		
1934–1940	RFK		
1940–1941	RDKA Riga		
1941	Pērkons Riga		
1942–1944	RFK		

International career
1926–1940	Latvia	38	(0)
- * Club domestic league appearances and goals

Pēteris Lauks (10 February 1902, in Riga – 15 March 1984, in Kitchener, Canada) was a Latvian football defender, one of the most capped footballers for Latvia national football team before World War II.

== Biography ==
Lauks began playing football when being a refugee during World War I near Ufa in 1916. Upon returning to Latvia he was a longtime player with Amatieris (from 1921 to 1933. His highest achievement with Amatieris was earning bronze medals in the Latvian Higher League in 1929. Lauks was one of the most reliable defenders in Latvian football of his era and he was called up to the national team a few times in 1926 and 1927, capping three matches in total.

When Lauks was already aged over thirty and his football career was presumably near its end he moved to RFK and made a sudden comeback. With RFK he won three Latvian league titles, became a two-time winner of the Latvian Cup and at the age of 33 returned to the national team. Lauks played in the last international match for Latvia before its loss of independence on 18 July 1940, he was aged 38 at the time. In total between 1926 and 1940 he had played in 38 matches for Latvia – only Ēriks Pētersons, Jānis Lidmanis, Alberts Šeibelis, Vladimirs Bērziņš and Arnolds Tauriņš had more caps for Latvia.

During the first Soviet occupation of Latvia Lauks played with RDKA Riga, during the Nazi occupation – with Pērkons Riga and again with RFK. After World War II Lauks ended up in Germany where he continued playing football until the age of 46. Later he left Germany for Canada where he lived until his death.
