= 1922 Latvian Football Championship =

Latvian Football Championship
- Season: 1922
- Champions: Kaiserwald
- Matches played: 30
- Goals scored: 121 (4.03 per match)

The 1922 Latvian Football Championship was contested by 6 teams with Kaiserwald emerging as the winners of the championship.

== League standings ==
Pos	Team	Pld	W	D	L	GF	GA	GD	Pts
1	Kaiserwald	10	9	0	1	43	11	+32	18
2	JKS	10	7	1	2	31	7	+24	15
3	LJS	10	4	2	4	18	22	−4	10
4	LSB	10	4	2	4	14	20	−6	10
5	Union	10	2	2	6	11	23	−12	6
6	Maccabi	10	0	1	9	4	38	−34	1

Source: rsssf.com
