= 1921 Latvian Football Championship =

Latvian Football Championship
- Season: 1921
- Champions: Kaiserwald

The 1921 Latvian Football Championship was the first Latvian Football Championship, it was contested by four teams with Kaiserwald winning the championship. The championship was not completed due to the unexpectedly early winter.

== League standings ==
Pos	Team	Pld	W	D	L	GF	GA	GD	Pts
1	Kaiserwald (C)	5	4	1	0	8	2	+6	9
2	YMCA	5	3	1	1	25	8	+17	7
3	Union	6	3	0	3	9	12	−3	6
4	Karaskola	6	0	0	6	1	21	−20	0

(C) Champions
