= Hermanis =

Male given name

- Gender: Male
- Name day: 11 April

Origin
- Region of origin: Latvia

Other names
- Related names: Herman, Hermann

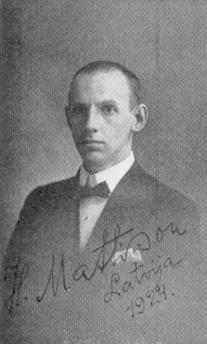
Picture of Hermanis Matisons

Hermanis is a Latvian masculine given name and surname and may refer to:

== Given name ==
- Hermanis Matisons (1894–1932), Latvian chess player
- Hermanis Saltups (1901–1968), Latvian footballer

== Surname ==
- Alvis Hermanis (born 1965), Latvian actor, theatre director and set designer
