= SK Super Nova =

Super Nova
- Full name: Sporta klubs Super Nova
- Nickname: Yellow Stars
- Founded: 2 August 2000; 26 years ago
- Ground: Jānis Skredelis' Stadium
- Capacity: 432
- President: Jānis Engelis
- Manager: Maksims Rafaļskis
- League: Virslīga
- 2024: 1st in Latvian First League (promoted)
- Website: http://www.supernova.lv/
colours	colours

SK Super Nova is a Latvian professional football club based in Riga. It was founded in 2000, and it has been involved in various levels of the Latvian football league system, including the top-tier Latvian Higher League and lower divisions. The team was based in Salaspils from 2022 till the end of 2023 season and returned to Riga in 2024.

== History ==
On 2 August 2000, on the basis of Riga Secondary School No. 62 from Ķengarags, SK Super Nova was created, which was represented only in the Latvian youth championships.

In 2002, Jānis Engelis was a graduate of Riga Secondary School No. 62, who continued his studies at the Latvian Academy of Sport Education and was invited to work as a volunteer coach at the Riga Secondary School No. 62 SK Super Nova. On December 18, 2002, Jānis Engelis became the club's president and it all grew to the status of an academy and a sports school.

On 19 July 2013, the Latvian youth football team SK Super Nova triumphed at the World Cup in Sweden, the Gothia Cup U-11 age group. With a final score of 6:4, SK Super Nova celebrated the victory, becoming the first Latvian football team in the U-11 age group to win the prestigious Gothia Cup.

In 2017, the club started playing in Latvian football league system from Latvian Second League in the Kurzeme and Zemgale zone. The first home field was Riga Wilhelm Ostwald Secondary School, which is located in Imanta, Riga. The season ended with 1st place in the Latvian Second League in the Kurzeme and Zemgale zone.

In 2018, they were promoted to the country's Latvian First League. SK Super Nova played its home games at the Olaine City Stadium, as they were unable to find a suitable solution in Riga. In the first two seasons they made it to the promotion rounds to Virslīga, where the team was defeated in both cases.

In 2022, they were promoted to the Virslīga. SK Super Nova debuted in the Latvian Higher League and played its home games at Salaspils Stadium.

In 2023, SK Super Nova gained the right to compete in the Virslīga, after FK Spartaks refused to play football in the Latvian Higher League. At the end of the season, SK Super Nova took last 10th place and got relegated to the Latvian First League.

In 2024, SK Super Nova team can once again be called a Riga team after two years spent in Salaspils. Jānis Skredelis' Stadium became the yellow-blue home field. At the end of the season, the club became the champion of the Optibet Future League, earning the right to return to the Virslīga next season after a one-year break.

In 2025, SK Super Nova returned to the Virslīga after winning the Optibet Future League the previous season. The club competed in the Latvian Higher League and the Latvian Football Cup, playing its home matches at Jānis Skredelis' Stadium in Riga. SK Super Nova finished the league season in 8th place, securing its place in the Virslīga for the 2026 season, and recorded 14 draw matches, a club record in the Latvian Higher League.

== Grounds ==
- Riga Wilhelm Ostwald Secondary School stadium, Riga (2017)
- Olaine city stadium, Olaine (2018 — 2020)
- RTU stadium, Riga (2021)
- Salaspils stadium, Salaspils (2022 — 2023)
- Jānis Skredelis' Stadium, Riga (2024 — 2026)

== Managers ==
- Sergejs Golubevs (2017)
- Jurģis Kalns (2018)
- Oļegs Blagonadeždins (2019)
- Nikolajs Ļubļins (2019)
- Viktors Ņesterenko (2019 — 2020)
- Aleksandrs Stradiņš (2020)
- Andrejs Lapsa (2021 — Jun 2022)
- Igors Korabļovs (Jun 2022)
- Aleksandrs Koliņko (Jun 2022 — Nov 2022)
- Igors Korabļovs (Jan 2023 — Feb 2023)
- Aleksandrs Koliņko (Feb 2023 — Jun 2023)
- Igors Korabļovs (Jun 2023)
- Sergejs Golubevs (Jun 2023 — Sep 2023)
- Igors Korabļovs (Sep 2023 — Dec 2023)
- Ervīns Pērkons (Dec 2023 — Nov 2025)
- Maksims Rafaļskis (Dec 2025 — Present)

== History in domestic competitions ==
- Seasons spent at Level 1 of the Latvian football league system: 3
- Seasons spent at Level 2 of the Latvian football league system: 5
- Seasons spent at Level 3 of the Latvian football league system: 1
- Seasons spent at Level 4 of the Latvian football league system: 0

Season	League	Placed	Pld	W	D	L	GF	GA	GD	Pts	Cup	Top Scorer (League)	Manager
2017	2. līga Kurzeme-Zemgale	1st	9	8	0	1	43	12	+31	24	Not participated	(Latvia) Edgars Kārkliņš – 11	(Latvia) Sergejs Golubevs
2017	2. līga Final	3rd	2	1	1	0	4	3	+1	4	Not participated	(Latvia) Edgars Kārkliņš – 13 (11+2)	(Latvia) Sergejs Golubevs
2018	1. līga	2nd	25	19	2	4	90	27	+63	59	Round of 16	(Georgia (country)) Giorgi Gogolashvili – 30 (28+2)	(Latvia) Jurģis Kalns
2019	1. līga	2nd	27	19	1	7	95	27	+68	58	Round of 16	(Latvia) Oskars Rubenis – 14	(Latvia) Oļegs Blagonadeždins, (Latvia) Nikolajs Ļubļins, (Latvia) Viktors Ņesterenko
2020	1. līga	6th	13	4	4	5	20	20	0	16	Round of 32	(Latvia) Staņislavs Pihockis – 3, (Azerbaijan) Vugar Askerov – 3	(Latvia) Viktors Ņesterenko, (Latvia) Aleksandrs Stradiņš
2021	1. līga	3rd	13	7	2	4	26	24	+2	23	Round of 32	(Latvia) Artjoms Troickis – 6, (Latvia) Igors Kovaļkovs – 6	(Latvia) Andrejs Lapsa
2022	Virslīga	10th	36	4	8	24	24	81	-57	20	Round of 16	(Latvia) Marko Regža – 8	(Latvia) Andrejs Lapsa, (Latvia) Igors Korabļovs, (Latvia) Aleksandrs Koliņko
2023	Virslīga	10th	36	3	5	28	25	96	-71	14	Round of 16	(Latvia) Jevgenijs Miņins – 10	(Latvia) Igors Korabļovs, (Latvia) Aleksandrs Koliņko, (Latvia) Sergejs Golubevs
2024	1. līga	1st	26	21	2	3	65	11	+54	65	Round of 64	(Ukraine) Dmytro Sula – 11, (Latvia) Haralds Silagailis – 11	(Latvia) Ervīns Pērkons
2025	Virslīga	8th	36	6	14	16	44	56	-12	32	Quarter-finals	(Ukraine) Dmytro Sula – 5, (Japan) Ryuga Nakamura – 5	(Latvia) Ervīns Pērkons

Notes: In 2020 and 2021, the Latvian Football Federation board decided to declare a state of emergency and, due to the restrictions introduced to limit COVID-19 infection, decided to end the Latvian First League season early.

== Honours ==
- Latvian First League
  - Champions (1): 2024

== Squad ==
As of 15 March 2026

Note: Flags indicate national team as defined under FIFA eligibility rules; some limited exceptions apply. Players may hold more than one non-FIFA nationality.

No.	Pos.	Nation	Player
2	DF	LAT	Kristers Augusts
3	DF	JPN	Rikuto Iida (on loan from Kyoto Sanga)
4	DF	LAT	Lenards Berzins
5	DF	LAT	Jegors Cīrulis
6	MF	LAT	Eduards Emsis
7	FW	LAT	Agris Glaudans
8	MF	LAT	Ivans Patrikejevs
9	FW	SEN	Amadou Samaté
10	FW	LAT	Valerijs Lizunovs
16	DF	LAT	Kristaps Romanovs
17	FW	LAT	Georgijs Bombāns
18	DF	LAT	Mikus Vasiļevskis

No.	Pos.	Nation	Player
19	MF	LAT	Alens Grikovs
20	DF	SEN	Ibrahima Diop
21	DF	LAT	Milans Tihonovics
22	MF	LAT	Kristers Skadmanis
24	MF	LAT	Ralfs Sitjakovs
25	DF	LAT	Mārcis Ošs
27	FW	SEN	Ndiaye Pathé
29	FW	ARM	Aram Baghdasaryan
31	GK	LAT	Toms Petrovics
32	FW	LAT	Raivis Kirss
90	GK	LAT	Davis Veisbuks
—	MF	NGR	Victor Promise (on loan from Jelgava)

== Club officials ==
As of 6 March 2026

Position	Staff
President	(Latvia) Jānis Engelis
Manager	(Latvia) Maksims Rafaļskis
Assistant Manager	(Brazil) Rodrigo Pereira Marques Da Silva
Goalkeeping Coach	(Latvia) Andrejs Adamovičs
Youth Coach	(Latvia) Vladislavs Pavļučenko
Fitness Coach	(Latvia) Oļegs Semjonovs
Medical Staff	(Latvia) Dzintars Stabiņš
Marketing Manager	(Latvia) Andris Grīnbergs
Team Administrator	(Latvia) Daniels Ivanovs
