= Eduards Freimanis =

Latvian footballer

Eduards Freimanis (22 February 1919, in Liepāja - 1993) was a former Latvian football forward, the first Latvian footballer to play with a professional club in England.

== Playing career ==
Freimanis started playing football in the early 1930s with the youth squad of Olimpija Liepāja. He played with the senior squad of Olimpija from 1937 to 1939, winning two Latvian Higher League titles. In 1939 he joined JKS Riga. In 1939 Freimanis was first capped for Latvia national football team and scored two goals in his very first international match (he played his second international match the next year). In 1940 when Latvia was annexed by the Soviet Union and former Latvian sports clubs were disbanded, Freimanis joined RAFS 1, later he played with Dinamo Riga. From 1941 to 1944 he played with Daugavieši and from 1942 to 1944 in the Riga selected team. In 1942 with six goals scored Freimanis was the best goalscorer in the Latvian Higher League.

After World War II Freimanis ended up in the West, from 1945 to 1946 he played in Greven, the next season he moved to Holstein Kiel, helping them to finish runners-up in the Schleswig-Holstein championship play-offs in the summer of 1947 and in the following year he settled in England. His first club there was the amateur side Eynesbury Rovers, but in the 1947/1948 season he became the first Latvian footballer to play in a professional English football club as he joined Peterborough United (in 21 match for the club he scored 22 goals), for two more seasons he played with Northampton Town F.C., until finally he landed in Nuneaton Borough, where he also worked as a coach for some time.

== Honours ==
Club Titles

- Latvian Higher League: 1938, 1939 Olimpija Liepāja

=== Caps ===
- 2 caps for Latvia (2 goals)
