= Rūdolfs Kundrāts =

Latvian footballer

Rūdolfs Voldemārs Kundrāts (13 August 1907 – 1954) was a Latvian football defender and official.

Kundrāts first gained attention while with LNJS Riga in 1926. The following year he moved to LSB Riga, one of the four clubs in the newly founded Latvian Higher League. The first two years which Kundrāts spent with LSB were relatively successful for the club as it finished third in the league on both occasions. However, in 1929, LSB finished last in Virsliga. After the disappointing season, Kundrāts left LSB for Riga Vanderer.

While with Vanderer, Kundrāts played his first game as a member of the Latvia national football team. He had been called to the national team during his time with LSB yet had not appeared in a match. He made his début on 27 June 1930 as Latvia drew 1–1 with Estonia in Tallinn. The next year he played six matches for Latvia, six more followed in 1932 and six again in 1933, for 19 caps total. Kundrāts's last game for Latvia was 4 September 1933, a 2–2 draw against Lithuania, securing a victory in the Baltic Cup.

Kundrāts played with Riga Vanderer until 1935, remaining one of the club's best defenders. In 1932 and 1934, the team won silver in the Latvian league; in the same year, the side won the Riga Football Cup. After retiring, he gained recognition as one of the best referees in the country.
