= Jānis Skredelis' Stadium =

Multi-purpose stadium in Rīga, Latvija

Jānis Skredelis Stadium
- Jāņa Skredeļa stadions
- Interactive map of Jānis Skredelis Stadium
- Full name: Rīgas Futbola skolas Jāņa Skredeļa sporta komplekss
- Former names: Sporta komplekss "Arkādija" ("Arkādija" Stadium)
- Location: Ojāra Vācieša iela 2, Torņakalns, Rīga, Latvia
- Coordinates: 56.933175°N 24.088273°E
- Owner: Riga City Council
- Capacity: 432
- Type: multi-purpose stadium

Tenants
- Latvia women's national football team Riga Football School; FK RFS (2015–2022); SK Super Nova (2024-2025)

Jānis Skredelis Stadium (Latvian: Jāņa Skredeļa stadions, formerly Sporta komplekss "Arkādija") is a multi-use stadium in Riga, Latvia. It is currently used mostly for football matches. The stadium capacity is 432 people.

== Tenants ==
It is currently the home ground of the Latvia women's national football team and the Latvian Third League team of the Riga Football School (Rīgas FS). From 2016 to 2022 it used to be the home stadium of Virslīga side FK RFS. Since 2024, it has been the home stadium of SK Super Nova.

== History ==
Until 1 March 2021 it was called the Arkādija Sports Complex after the adjacent Arkādija Park. On this day it was renamed to honor Latvian football manager and sports executive Jānis Skredelis, who had recently died.
