= Reinholds Robots =

Latvian footballer (born 1911)

Reinholds Jēkabs Eduards Robats (born 10 January 1911, date of death unknown) was a Latvian footballer.

Robots, at the age of 19, made a single international appearance in a friendly match against Finland in Helsinki; Latvia were defeated 0–4 and generally received criticism in the Latvian press. He was not selected for the national team again but played Latvian team football throughout the 1930s.

In 1931, Robots joined JKS Riga, a team which gained promotion to the Virsliga, (Latvia's highest football league), following the 1931 season. He left JKS Riga in early 1934 to join the V.Ķuze team, which in 1936 also gained promotion to the Virsliga. However, he left Ķuze shortly before the start of the 1936 season and joined a lower league team, LAS Riga. He played with them until the end of his career.

== See also ==
- Football in Latvia
- List of football clubs in Latvia
