= Alfons Novickis =

Latvian footballer

Personal information
- Date of birth: 1906
- Place of birth: Riga, Russian Empire
- Date of death: 3 November 1931 (aged 25)
- Place of death: Riga, Latvia
- Position: Midfielder

Senior career*
Years	Team	Apps	(Gls)
1926–1927	LNJS Riga		
1928	RFK		
1929–1931	Riga Vanderer		

International career
1929–1931	Latvia	9	(0)
- * Club domestic league appearances and goals

Alfons Novickis (1906 - 3 November 1931 in Riga) was a Latvian footballer.

== Biography ==
Novickis rose to fame as a great footballing talent at the aged of 15 when he worked as a paper-boy at a publishing company. His first senior football club was LNJS Riga, where he played in 1926. In 1928 Novickis played with RFK and then joined Riga Vanderer, the club for which he played the best and last years of his career. On 27 July 1929 Novickis made his international debut for Latvia. In total Novickis played 9 international matches for Latvia national football team between 1929 and 1931.

Just as quickly as Novickis' star had risen in Latvian football, he fell. After a 0–6 loss to Sweden in a friendly match on 26 July 1931 Novickis along with several other Latvian internationals made a bad public appearance under alcohol on the way back to Riga and as a result of it Novickis and Alberts Tauriņš were disqualified by the Latvian Football Federation for a year.

In the autumn of 1931 Novickis joined the army and on 3 November he committed suicide by shooting himself. It was later speculated that Novickis had killed himself because of some unknown disease and alcohol.
