= Harijs Pikols =

Latvian footballer

Harijs Pikols (1903-198?) was a Latvian footballer, one of the founders of the Olimpija Liepāja football club.

== Biography ==
In 1921 Pikols was among a group of young Liepāja men who founded one of the best pre-war Latvian football clubs - Olimpija Liepāja. Pikols was a central defender who was known for his very strong shot and who regularly scored from the penalty spot for Olimpija. Pikols also played 5 matches for Latvia national football team. With Olimpija he won 3 Latvian league titles and also the Riga Football Cup for 3 consecutive seasons. In addition to football, Pikols also played bandy (won the Latvian league) and ice hockey (second place in Latvia) with the respective Olimpija teams. Pikols retired from football in 1932 when he saw that the young and talented Fricis Laumanis was ready to take his place in the Olimpija defence.
