= 1926 Latvian Football Championship =

Latvian Higher League
- Season: 1926

Statistics of the Latvian Higher League for the 1926 season- RFK were the league champions:

== League standings ==
1st stage: Riga Group

Pos	Team	Pld	W	D	L	GF	GA	GD	Pts	City
1	RFK	5	5	0	0	32	7	+25	10	Riga
2	LSB	5	4	0	1	21	5	+16	8	Riga
3	Amatieris	5	3	0	2	12	10	+2	6	Riga
4	JKS	5	1	1	3	4	19	−15	3	Riga
5	LNJS	5	1	0	4	8	21	−13	2	Liepāja
6	ASK	5	0	1	4	3	18	−15	1	Riga

Source: rsssf.com

2nd stage: Finals

Pos	Team	Pld	W	D	L	GF	GA	GD	Pts	City
1	RFK	4	4	0	0	36	3	+33	8	Riga
2	Olimpija	4	3	0	1	13	2	+11	6	Liepāja
3	ASK	4	2	0	2	15	10	+5	4	Daugavpils
4	Jelgavas	4	1	0	3	11	16	−5	2	Jelgava
5	Valkas SB	4	0	0	4	5	49	−44	0	Valka

Source: rsssf.com
