= Alfons Jēgers =

Latvian footballer and hockey player

- Born: 9 December 1919; Riga, Latvia
- Died: 11 June 1998 (aged 78)
Ice hockey career
- Played for: Dinamo Rīga (1946-1951, 1952-1957)
Association football career
- Position: Forward
Senior career*
Years	Team	Apps	(Gls)
1940, 1946-1948	Dinamo Riga		
1950-1952	Daugava Rīga		
International career
1939	Latvia	1	
- * Club domestic league appearances and goals

Alfons Jēgers (9 December 1919 – 11 June 1998) was a Latvian football and hockey player. He is recognized by the USSR for his achievements in both sports, receiving the title of Master of Sports in 1950 and Merited Master of Sports in 1951 for ice hockey and football, respectively.

== Biography ==
Jēgers came from a poor family and in the first years he played football barefoot with a "ball" made from papers and old clothes in the street. At the age of 16 he caught the attention of the trade-union football team. He soon emerged as a very talented footballer and his popularity was on the rise as he scored the single late goal in the victory for his team against the renowned Rīgas FK.

In 1939, Jēgers played his single international football match for Latvia. In 1940. when Latvian sports life was reorganized according to Soviet standards, Jēgers played for Dinamo Riga with which he went on a tourney to Moscow, Kiev and Tbilisi. After the German occupation, Nazis sent him to Stutthof concentration camp where Jēgers caught typhus and was close to death. However, he survived and after the end of World War II he returned to both football and ice hockey.

From 1946 to 1948, he played football with Dinamo Riga, when it was merged with Daugava Rīga he became a player of Daugava. From 1950 to 1952, he was the captain of Daugava. In 1950, he was given the title Master of Sports in hockey. In 1951, he was awarded the title Merited Master of Sports and was recognized as the best goal scorer for the club in the Soviet Top League. Jēgers had to retire from football when, after the 1952 season, Daugava was relegated from the top league and in the whole season Jēgers hadn't scored a single goal.

In ice hockey Jēgers made a career only after World War II when he became a player with Dinamo Rīga. He played hockey on a professional level until 1957, with the exception of the 1951-52 season. He later worked in coaching.
