= Haralds =

- Gender: Male
- Name day: 23 February

Origin
- Region of origin: Latvia

Other names
- Related names: Harijs, Harold

Haralds is a Latvian given name, a variant of Harold. It may refer to:

- Haralds Blaus (1885–1945), Latvian sports shooter
- Haralds Kārlis (born 1991), Latvian professional Basketball player
- Haralds Mednis (1906–2000), Latvian conductor
- Haralds Ritenbergs (born 1932), Latvian ballet dancer and teacher
- Haralds Silovs, Latvian long track and short track speed skater
- Haralds Vasiļjevs, Latvian ice hockey coach
- Haralds Šlēgelmilhs, known internationally as Harald Schlegelmilch (born 1987), Latvian racing driver.

== See also ==
- Harald (disambiguation)
- Harold (disambiguation)
