= Vladimirs Bērziņš =

Latvian footballer (1905–?)

Vladimirs Bērziņš (born 16 December 1905, date of death unknown) was a Latvian football midfielder and manager and was one of the most capped footballers in pre-war Latvia.

== Biography ==
Bērziņš began playing football with the mostly German sports club Union Riga in 1925. He was selected to play for the Latvia national football team on 26 August 1925 for a friendly match against Estonia, but he was removed later from the list of selected players.

At the end of the 1926 football season, Bērziņš left Union for the three-time champion of Latvia, RFK, where he played the rest of his football career. With RFK, he won the Latvian Higher League title four times – in 1930, 1931, 1934 and 1935. In the second half of the 1930s, Bērziņš played very little with RFK and retired from playing in 1939. He did however return to RFK in 1943. In total, Bērziņš played 40 international matches for Latvia from 1927 to 1936, being the fourth most capped Latvian football international behind Ēriks Pētersons, Jānis Lidmanis, and Alberts Šeibelis.

After World War II, Bērziņš ended up in Germany, where he coached the local football club of FC Gundelfingen in 1946. Another former Latvian international Harijs Lazdiņš played in goal for the Gundelfingen club.

In later years, Bērziņš settled in Canada.
