= Maksims Rafaļskis =

Latvian footballer

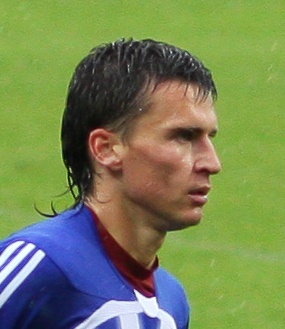
- Rafaļskis with Liepājas Metalurgs in 2009

Personal information
- Full name: Maksims Rafaļskis
- Date of birth: 14 May 1984 (age 42)
- Place of birth: Riga, Latvian SSR, Soviet Union
- Height: 1.77 m (5 ft 10 in)
- Position: Midfielder

Team information
- Current team: Super Nova (manager)

Youth career
- JFC Skonto

Senior career*
Years	Team	Apps	(Gls)
2005–2008	Rīga	67	(3)
2008–2010	Liepājas Metalurgs	50	(11)
2011–2012	Baltika Kaliningrad	18	(0)
2012	→ Daugava (loan)	20	(1)
2013	ÍA	11	(0)
2014	Jūrmala	7	(0)
2014–2016	Wigry Suwałki	33	(1)
2017–2018	Jelgava	35	(0)

International career
2008–2011	Latvia	13	(0)

Managerial career
- 2020–2022: Metta (youth)
- 2025: Skanstes SK
- 2026–: Super Nova
- * Club domestic league appearances and goals

Maksims Rafaļskis (born 14 May 1984) is a Latvian professional football manager and former player who is currently in charge of Latvian Higher League club Super Nova.

== Club career ==
Rafaļskis played for JFC Skonto in his youth years, but started his professional career with FK Rīga in 2005. He played there for three years, making 67 league appearances and scoring three goals, also helping his team in cup competitions. Rafaļskis left the team in 2008, because it struggled with its financial situation and could not guarantee his contract being satisfied. Not long after leaving, he signed a contract with Liepājas Metalurgs. He played there for two years, making 46 league appearances and scoring 11 goals, as well as becoming one of the team's leaders. In February 2011, he went on trial with Russian First Division club FC Baltika Kaliningrad and signed a contract with them. At the start of 2012 Rafaļskis left Baltika, returning to the Latvian Higher League and joining Daugava Daugavpils. He became the Latvian Higher League champion in 2012. On 14 February 2013, Rafaļskis signed a two-year deal with the Icelandic Pepsi League club ÍA. Prior to the 2014 Latvian Higher League season, Rafaļskis joined FC Jūrmala. In September 2014, he moved to the Polish I liga club Wigry Suwałki, signing a one-year contract.

== International career ==
Rafaļskis made his debut for Latvia national team on 12 August 2009 in a friendly match against Bulgaria. He has made 13 international appearances, scoring no goals.

== Honours ==
Liepājas Metalurgs

- Latvian Higher League: 2009

Daugava

- Latvian Higher League: 2012
