= Kārlis Tīls =

Latvian footballer and manager

Personal information
- Date of birth: 1906
- Position: Defender

Senior career*
Years	Team	Apps	(Gls)
- Olimpija Liepāja

International career
1926–1931	Latvia	9	(0)

Managerial career
- 1945–1948: FHK Liepājas Metalurgs
- * Club domestic league appearances and goals

Kārlis Tīls (1906-196?) was a Latvian international football defender and football manager, one of the most legendary footballers in the history of Liepāja.

== Biography ==
At the age of 17 Tīls was one of the footballers who played in the first ever official match of Olimpija Liepāja as the club lost 1 - 2 to LNJS Liepāja. Together with Olimpija he went through all the club's glories and disasters. He was with Olimpija as it won its six Latvian league titles and the Riga Football Cup three times in a row. From 1926 to 1931 Tīls played 9 international matches for Latvia national football team.

After World War II when Olimpija was disbanded and a new club - Daugava Liepāja was formed, Tīls was appointed as the club's head coach. Despite his veteran age he also played for Daugava in his first two seasons with the club. His last match as a player was on 22 September 1946 as Daugava won 4 - 1 against Lokomotīve Rīga. He worked with Daugava for 4 seasons winning both the Latvian league and the Latvian Cup in 1946 and 1947. In 1946 the battle for the title was especially tough as Daugava had to win against league leaders AVN in Riga yet despite losing 0 - 1 against the first half Tīls managed to convince the players of their straight and win 4 - 1.

Before the 1948 season 6 best footballers of Daugava left the club as they were sent to play with Riga clubs in the Soviet league and Daugava finished only 6th in the Latvian league and was merged with Dinamo Liepāja with a new head coach.

Tīls didn't coach any other football clubs afterwards and worked in a store until the end of his days.

== Honours ==
=== As player ===
- Latvian league winner: 7 (1927–1929,1933, 1936, 1938, 1939, 1946)
- Latvian Cup winner: (1946)

=== As head coach ===
- Latvian league winner: 2 (1946, 1947)
- Latvian Cup winner: 2 (1946, 1947)
