= Dmytro Sula =

Ukrainian footballer

Personal information
- Full name: Dmytro Anatoliiovych Sula
- Date of birth: 22 February 1994 (age 32)
- Place of birth: Odesa, Ukraine
- Height: 1.79 m (5 ft 10 1/2 in)
- Position: Forward

Youth career
- 2007–2008: Sports School 11 (Chornomorets) Odesa
- 2008–2011: Chornomorets Odesa

Senior career*
Years	Team	Apps	(Gls)
2011–2012	Chornomorets Odesa	0	(0)
2011–2012	Chornomorets-2 Odesa	13	(4)
2017	Tskhinvali	2	(0)
2017	Real Pharma Odesa	8	(5)
2017–2018	Dnipro-1	14	(1)
2018	Metalist 1925 Kharkiv	15	(5)
2019	Inhulets Petrove	11	(3)
2020	Kremin Kremenchuk	10	(5)
2020–2021	Mykolaiv	20	(3)
2021–2022	LNZ Cherkasy	10	(3)
2022–2023	Real Pharma	2	(0)
2023	Kroměříž		
2023	KS Wiązownica	13	(2)
2024	Karpaty Krosno	15	(2)
2024–	Super Nova	34	(16)
- * Club domestic league appearances and goals as of 17 November 2025

Dmytro Anatoliiovych Sula (Ukrainian: Дмитро Анатолійович Сула; born 22 February 1994) is a Ukrainian professional footballer who plays as a forward.

== Career ==
He is the product of the Chornomorets Odesa school system. Sula made his debut at professional level in Ukrainian Second League during the 2011–12 season on 23 July 2011, in an away game against Yednist Plysky, during which Sula scored twice. Sula was the author of the first goal for Metalist 1925 Kharkiv in the Ukrainian First League.

In December 2018, Sula signed for Inhulets Petrove, becoming their first winter signing.

In July 2024 he joined Latvian club Super Nova. Sula left the club at the end of December 2025 after playing in twenty-three matches and scoring five goals for the club. He became a free-agent in January 2026.

== Honours ==
Karpaty Krosno

- Polish Cup (Krosno regionals): 2023–24
