= Football in Latvia =

- Country: Latvia
- Governing body: Latvian Football Federation
- National team: Latvia national football team

National competitions
- Latvian Cup

Club competitions
- Latvian Higher League

International competitions
- Champions League; Europa League; Europa Conference League; Super Cup; FIFA Club World Cup; FIFA World Cup (National Team); European Championship (National Team); UEFA Nations League (National Team)

Football in Latvia is the number one sport based on participation, but the third sport after ice hockey and basketball based on popularity. Many other sports are also more popular than football in Latvia, but in recent years it has gained more popularity. The Latvian Football Federation (Latvian: Latvijas Futbola federācija) is the sport's national governing body. There is a league system, with the Higher League and First League serving as the top leagues in Latvia. The Latvian Second League is composed mostly of amateur teams.

The Latvian Cup is the main national cup competition in the country.

== History ==
=== Origins in Latvia ===
Football was first introduced to Latvia through the British, transferring the sport through sailors, civil servants, fairs, and businesses. In 1907, workers from the British metal-working factory Salamandra formed the first football club in Latvia, titled the British Football Club (BFC). The first Latvian football club, Amatieris, was founded in 1912. Between 1906 and 1921, Latvian football became organized by regional leagues, with the Riga Football Cup serving as largest organization nationally between 1910 and 1915. The Riga Football Cup continued to be held intermittently between 1910 and 1936 until it was replaced by the Latvian Football Cup in 1937.

The Latvian Football Union (LFS) was founded in 1921, the same year that Latvia gained independence from Russia following the First World War. Latvia joined FIFA through LFS in 1922. Between 1922 and 1927, LFS organized the Latvian Championship as a qualifier for FIFA, succeeding the Riga Football Cup as the highest championship. In 1927, Virsliga (Premier League) replaced the Latvian Championship.

Between 1922 and 1927, international football matches between Baltic teams led to the formation of the Baltic Cup in 1928. The cup was tri-lateral, held between Latvia, Lithuania, and Estonia, and was intended to improve the union between the Baltic countries. Both Finland and Poland were considered for inclusion, but it was decided to limit those countries to bi-lateral competitions. As part of the cup, a unified Baltic team was also proposed, but was not achieved.

=== WWII ===
During WWII, successive occupations by Russia and Germany lessened sport activity in the nation. With the first occupation by Russia in 1940, the Virsliga was disbanded, along with many other regional teams. The Soviets began a new Soviet Latvian Championship in 1941, but this was interrupted by German occupation later that year. In 1942, 1943, and 1944, a reduced Virsliga was held with less than 8 teams, but was interrupted before completion in 1944.

=== Football in Soviet Latvia (SSR) ===
The Soviet re-occupation of Latvia in 1944 led to a lasting reorganization of the football system according to a soviet-socialist model. Football functioned for the Soviets as a method to build nationalism and display successes of the socialist model. Old teams were often renamed instead of dispanded, and became sponsored by new soviet-organized associations; industries, trade unions, and state organizations. Professionalism within teams was derided as capitalistic, although players were still retained as employees of the sponsored teams. Soviet media restricted coverage of leagues through sports publications and exhibited the accomplishments of teams as examples of collective action. Coverage of players propagandized the image of the Soviet-man, excluding women from football. Women's football was unrecognized in the USSR and officially banned as an organized sport from 1972 until 1989, at which point the USSR Women's Football Association was formed.

To replace the disbanded Virsliga, the newly formed Latvian SSR resumed the Soviet Latvian Championship in 1945. The League would last until 1991 during the collapse of the Soviet Union. Unlike other eastern-European SSRs, Latvia left FIFA under soviet control and did not participate in the World Cup and European championships. Instead, various teams of the Latvian SSR, including FC Dinamo Riga and FC Daugava Riga, played in the Soviet First League and the Soviet Top League.

=== Post-Soviet Football ===
After regaining independence in 1990, the Latvian Football Union reformed as the Latvian Football Federation (LFF). As a part of this reformation, Virsliga was also reorganized. Membership to FIFA was restored in 1992 and membership to the EUFA was gained the same year.

== Domestic Football ==
Skonto FC were the most popular and successful football team in Latvia and have won the Latvian Higher League 14 times since independence from Russia. FK Ventspils and FK RFS are the only teams from Latvia which have played in the group stage of the UEFA Europa League (2009–10 and 2024–25, respectively). Also FK RFS reached group stage of the UEFA Conference League (2022–23 UEFA Europa Conference League). No Latvian team has ever reached the group stage of the UEFA Champions League.

== Women's Football ==
Women's football was not recognized as a sport in the USSR, with organized competitions being banned in the 1972. As a result of the ban Latvia was unable to form a women's team until after the ban was lifted and the USSR Women's Football Association was formed in 1989. The first women's team, "Latvija", was formed in 1989, and was renamed to "RAF Jelgava" in 1990. The team competed in the 1990 Soviet women's football championship in the highest league, where they finished in 8th place, they competed again in 1991, but did not qualify for the final playoff stage.

The national team has never qualified for any major international tournaments, however they started competing in the Baltic Women's Cup in 1996, winning for the first time in 1997, then winning five more time in 2011, 2017, 2018, 2019, and 2025. The team participated in the World Cup Qualifiers for the first time in 2013, but did not make it through.

== National Stadium ==
For many years, Latvia had been one of very few Baltic footballing nations without a primary national stadium. The Latvian national team currently plays most of its international games in Daugava Stadium and Skonto Stadium, both in the capital city of Riga. Neither of these stadiums meets the standards set by UEFA/FIFA, due to low seating capacity (less than 11,000). In 2023, the Latvian Football Federation partnered with an investor from the United Arab Emirates (UAE), Mohamed Ali Alabbar, and they formulated a plan to build a modern stadium in Riga. The plan was to construct a 15,000- to 20,000-seat stadium in either of two popular sites in Riga, Lucavsala and Ziepniekkalns. Although still in early stages of development, the LFF had designed a concept of how this new stadium would look and the immediate and future impact it is expected to impose. The LFF president, Lasenko, envisions a stadium that would stand for more that just football, a site that would attract international events (concerts, popular artists). However, due to unclear funding strategies among the UAE investors, the Latvian football governing body, and other organization that were involved, the plan was put to a hold.

In October 2025, it was announced that the project has taken a significant leap forward, with a much clearer picture of the economic, social, and urban development strategies necessary to make it a success. This stadium will serve as a multifunctional complex, with facilities such as training grounds, youth facilities, educational spaces, and other public revenues for the community. Social Enterprise Project (SEP), one of Latvia's biggest architecture companies, and Populous, an organization known for its projects with some of the world most symbolic stadiums, are behind the development of this modernized concept. The project is expected to be completed in 2027.

== League system ==
The table below illustrates the comprehensive structure of Latvian league football.

Note: Exact numbers of clubs at every level of the league system, particularly those at lower levels, are subject to change and are current as of the 2022 season.

Level	Total clubs (80 +-)	League(s) / division(s)			
1	10	Higher League; 10 clubs – 1 or 2 relegations			
2	14	First League; 14 clubs – 1 or 2 promotions, 2 or 3 relegations			
3	16	Second League East; 8 clubs – 0 to 3 promotions (2 to 3 nationwide), 0 to 4 relegations (4 nationwide)		Second League West; 8 clubs – 0 to 3 promotions (2 to 3 nationwide), 0 to 4 relegations (4 nationwide)	
4	37	Third League Centre; 10 clubs – 0 to 2 promotions (4 nationwide) (Note: Promotion to either the Second League East or Second League West is based on geographic factors.)	Third League East; 9 clubs – 0 to 2 promotions (4 nationwide)	Third League North; 10 clubs – 0 to 2 promotions (4 nationwide)	Third League West; 8 clubs – 0 to 2 promotions (4 nationwide)

== National team ==
The Latvia national football team in 2003 qualified to Euro 2004. This resulted in being the first and currently only Baltic national team to do so.

== See also ==
=== National teams ===
- Latvia national football team
- Latvia national under-21 football team
- Latvia national under-19 football team
- Latvia national under-17 football team

==== Women's teams ====
- Latvia women's national football team

=== Competitions ===
==== Leagues ====
- Latvian Higher League
- Latvian First League
- Latvian Second League

==== Women's leagues ====
- Latvian Women's League

==== Cups ====
- Latvian Football Cup
- Latvian Supercup

== Attendances ==
The average attendance per top-flight football league season and the club with the highest average attendance:

Season	League average	Best club	Best club average
2025	434	Riga FC	1,173
2024	483	Riga FC	1,200
