= Kurts Plade =

Latvian footballer

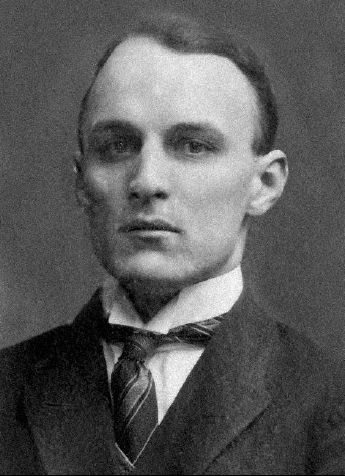

Personal information
- Date of birth: 16 August 1898
- Place of birth: Riga, Latvia
- Date of death: February 1945
- Place of death: Poznań, Poland

International career
Years	Team	Apps	(Gls)
1923	Latvia	1	(0)

Kurts Plade (16 August 1898 – February 1945) was a Latvian footballer. He played in one match for the Latvia national football team in 1923. Kurts was one of four Plade brothers who played for the Latvia football team, the others were Alfrēds, Voldemars and Teodors.
