= Nordeka LFKA =

Latvian football club

- Full name: Nordeka LFKA
- Ground: Riga, Latvia
- League: 2. līga

Nordeka LFKA is a Latvian football club located in Riga and playing in Rīgas zona of Latvian 2. līga

== Players ==
=== First-team squad ===
Note: Flags indicate national team as defined under FIFA eligibility rules; some limited exceptions apply. Players may hold more than one non-FIFA nationality.

| No. | Pos. | Nation | Player |
|---|---|---|---|
| — | GK | LVA | A. Ovčinnikovs |
| — | DF | LVA | V. Terentjevs |
| — | DF | LVA | A. Saveljevs |
| — | DF | LVA | J. Makovskis |
| — | DF | LVA | J. Zeltiņš |
| — | MF | LVA | E. Nitišs |

| No. | Pos. | Nation | Player |
|---|---|---|---|
| — | MF | LVA | A. Semjonovs |
| — | MF | LVA | D. Putrans |
| — | MF | LVA | A. Aksjonovs |
| — | FW | LVA | R. Sidorovs |
| — | FW | LVA | A. Čukardins |
