= Les Dodds =

English footballer

Personal information
- Full name: Leslie Smith Dodds
- Date of birth: 20 September 1912
- Place of birth: Newcastle upon Tyne, England
- Date of death: 29 November 1967 (aged 55)
- Position: Winger

Senior career*
Years	Team	Apps	(Gls)
1928–1929	Newcastle Swifts		
1931–1934	Grimsby Town	14	(1)
1934–1935	Hull City	20	(4)
1935–1936	Torquay United	34	(4)
1936–1937	Wellington Town		
1937–1939	Clapton Orient	53	(4)
1939	Hartlepools United	0	(0)
1939	Peterborough United		
- * Club domestic league appearances and goals

Leslie Smith Dodds (20 September 1912 – 29 November 1967) was an English professional footballer who played as a winger.
