= Voldemārs Plade =

Latvian footballer

Personal information
- Date of birth: 24 December 1900
- Place of birth: Riga, Russian Empire
- Date of death: 27 January 1961 (aged 60)
- Position: Forward

Youth career
- 1912: Union Riga

Senior career*
Years	Team	Apps	(Gls)
1921–1925	Ķeizarmežs		
1926–1927	RFK		
1928–1935	Riga Vanderer		

International career
1923–1929	Latvia	16	(9)

Managerial career
- 1933: V.Ķuze
- 1935: Universitātes Sports
- 1935–1936: Riga Vanderer
- 1936–1937: LAS Riga
- * Club domestic league appearances and goals

Voldemārs Plade (sometimes also called Valdis Plade; 24 December 1900 – 27 January 1961) was a Latvian football forward and manager, the most notable of the four Plade brothers who played for the Latvia national football team. He was born in Riga.

Plade was one of five football playing brothers. In his youth he played with Union Riga and Āgenskalns sports club; but he became widely known in 1921 when playing for Ķeizarmežs. Alongside his brothers Kurts Plade, Teodors Plade and Alfrēds Plade, who all also played with Ķeizarmežs, Plade won Latvian league titles in 1922 and 1923. Unlike his brothers, Plade proved to be a long-lasting force in Latvian football and was a national team regular from 1923 to 1929, capping 16 international appearances and scoring 9 goals. In a match against Lithuania at the 1929 Baltic Cup, Plade scored three goals for Latvia from passes from the rising star Ēriks Pētersons. Plade represented Latvia at the 1924 Summer Olympics.

After the dissolution of Ķeizarmežs in 1925, Plade joined RFK with which he played for two years. After two years with RFK Plade joined the newly founded Riga Vanderer with which he occasionally played until 1935.

As early as 1933 Plade also took up coaching, working with V. Ķuze, Universitātes Sports, Riga Vanderer and LAS Riga. From at least 1936 he also appeared regularly as a football referee.

In 1939 Plade as a Baltic German repatriated to Germany. He visited Riga in December 1942 before returning to the Eastern Front of World War II.
