= Alfrēds Plade =

Latvian footballer

Personal information
- Date of birth: 11 June 1905
- Place of birth: Riga, Latvia
- Date of death: 29 March 1944 (aged 38)
- Position: Midfielder

International career
Years	Team	Apps	(Gls)
1923	Latvia	1	(0)

Alfrēds Plade (11 June 1905 – 29 March 1944) was a Latvian footballer who played as a midfielder. He made one appearance for the Latvia national team in 1923 and was part of the squad at the 1924 Summer Olympics.

== Personal life and death ==
Plade was born in Riga, son of cantor Jekabs Plade and his wife Sofija Rozalija (nee Veikmane). He was one of four Plade brothers who played for the Latvia football team, the others were Voldemars, Kurts and Teodors. He did compulsory military service in a Latvian Army tank regiment in 1925-26 and worked as a cantor.

In 1939, unlike his brothers he did not repatriate to Germany as a Baltic German and remained a Latvian national. During the German occupation of Latvia in World War II he joined the Latvian Auxiliary Police and was killed in action on the Russian Front in March 1944.
