= Djibril Gueye =

Senegalese footballer (born 2006)

Personal information
- Date of birth: 6 October 2006 (age 20)
- Place of birth: Senegal
- Height: 1.95 m (6 ft 5 in)
- Position: Centre-back

Team information
- Current team: Sporting CP B (on loan from Leganés)

Youth career
- Noliane FC
- 2025: Leganés

Senior career*
Years	Team	Apps	(Gls)
2024–2025	Colegio Claret	7	(0)
2025–	Leganés B	11	(0)
2025–	Leganés	1	(0)
2026–	→ Sporting CP B (loan)	0	(0)
- * Club domestic league appearances and goals as of 9 June 2026

Djibril Gueye (born 6 October 2006) is a Senegalese footballer who plays as a centre-back for Portuguese club Sporting CP B, on loan from Spanish club CD Leganés.

== Career ==
Gueye joined CD Leganés' Juvenil squad in January 2025, after having already made his senior debut with Tercera Andaluza side CD Colegio Claret. Promoted to the reserves in Tercera Federación ahead of the 2025–26 season, he made his first team debut on 29 October 2025, starting in a 4–1 away routing of CD Azuaga, for the campaign's Copa del Rey.

On 27 November 2025, Gueye renewed his contract with Lega until 2029. He made his professional debut on 4 December, starting in a 2–1 home loss to Albacete Balompié, also for the national cup.

On 1 September 2026, Gueye was loaned to Portuguese club Sporting CP for one year, being initially a member of the B-team.
