= Česlavs Stančiks =

Latvian footballer (1896–1940)

Česlavs Stančiks (26 September 1896 – 18 July 1980) was a Latvian footballer. In 1939 he resettled in Germany as part of resettlement of all Baltic Germans.

== Club playing career ==
Stančiks first football club was Amatieris for which he played in 1912 at the age of just sixteen. From 1913 he played with Union Riga. While being a refugee in Moscow during World War I Stančiks played football with Sokolniki Moscow in 1915. After the end of the war Stančiks returned to Latvia where after a brief time with his former club Union he joined Kaiserswald FC with which he won the first ever Latvian championship in 1922 and the second title in 1923. After the dissolution of Kaiserswald after the 1925 season Stančiks joined RFK for which he played in 1926 in 1927, winning his third league title in 1926. In addition to the league success Stančiks also became a two-time winner of the Riga Football Cup with RFK.

In 1928 Stančiks joined the newly founded RFK off shot and future rivals Riga Vanderer, for which he played until 1932, missing his fourth Latvian title in a gold medal match against ASK Riga in his match with Vanderer. In 1936 Stančiks played with LSB Riga which won the Riga 1st league football tournament.

== National team playing career ==
Stančiks represented Latvia national football team in its first ever official international match on 24 September 1922. He was occasionally selected to play for the national team until 1931, although he played with it less and less in his last international years. In total he capped 20 appearances for Latvia and scored two goals. Stančiks was a member of Latvia football team at the 1924 Summer Olympics.
