= Jurģis Kalns =

Latvian footballer (born 1982)

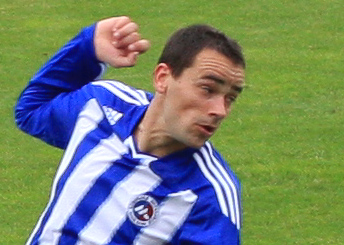

Personal information
- Date of birth: 5 October 1982 (age 44)
- Place of birth: Liepāja, Latvian SSR, Soviet Union
- Position: Forward

Senior career*
| Years | Team | Apps | (Gls) |
| 2001–2005 | FK Liepājas Metalurgs | 88 | (14) |
| 2005–2007 | FC Daugava Riga | 63 | (19) |
| 2008 | FK Ventspils | 10 | (0) |
| 2009 | FC Daugava Riga | 31 | (15) |
| 2010–2013 | FK Liepājas Metalurgs | 101 | (34) |
| 2014 | FK Metta | 34 | (1) |
| 2015 | FK Auda | | |

Managerial career
- 2015–2017: FK Auda
- 2018: SK Super Nova
- 2019–2020: FK Tukums 2000
- 2020: FK Tukums 2000 (assistant)
- 2020: FK Tukums 2000
- 2021: Valmiera FC (assistant)
- 2022–2024: Valmiera FC
- 2024–2025: Visakha FC
- 2025–: FK Auda
- * Club domestic league appearances and goals

Jurģis Kalns (born 5 October 1982) is a Latvian football manager and former footballer who is the manager of Latvian club FK Auda.

== Career ==
Kalns was born on 5 October 1982 in Liepāja, Latvia. He is a native of Liepāja, Latvia. He mainly operated as a forward. He started his playing career with FK Liepājas Metalurgs and remained in Latvia until his final match as a player in 2015. He was described as "one of the most productive players of the Latvian football superleague... outstanding for several years".

Kalns obtained a UEFA A License. He was regarded to prefer the 4-3-3 formation. In 2015, Kalns was appointed manager of Latvian side FK Auda. In 2018, he was appointed manager of Latvian side SK Super Nova. In 2019, he was appointed manager of Latvian side FK Tukums 2000. He also worked as their assistant manager. He suffered relegation while managing the club. In 2022, he was appointed manager of Latvian side Valmiera FC. He previously worked as their assistant manager. He helped the club win their first league title.

In 2024, Kalns was appointed manager of Cambodian side Visakha FC. During his tenure, countrymen Vitālijs Jagodinskis and Artūrs Karašausks signed for Visakha. He left in January 2025 and returned to FK Auda.
