= FK Latvijas finieris =

Latvian football club

- Full name: Futbola klubs Latvijas finieris
- Ground: Riga, Latvia
- League: 2. līga

FK Latvijas finieris is a Latvian football club located in Riga and playing in Rīgas zona of Latvian 2. līga.

== Players ==
=== First-team squad ===
Note: Flags indicate national team as defined under FIFA eligibility rules; some limited exceptions apply. Players may hold more than one non-FIFA nationality.

| No. | Pos. | Nation | Player |
|---|---|---|---|
| — | GK | (Latvia) LVA | A. Olejniks |
| — | DF | (Latvia) LVA | J. Grigorjevs |
| — | DF | (Latvia) LVA | S. Emeljanovs |
| — | DF | (Latvia) LVA | V. Lazarenko |
| — | DF | (Latvia) LVA | K. Petrovs |
| — | MF | (Latvia) LVA | J. Karašauskas |
| — | MF | (Latvia) LVA | V. Bogdanovs |

| No. | Pos. | Nation | Player |
|---|---|---|---|
| — | MF | (Latvia) LVA | V. Rjabinins |
| — | MF | (Latvia) LVA | A. Šketovs |
| — | MF | (Latvia) LVA | V. Bogdans |
| — | FW | (Latvia) LVA | B. Moņaks |
| — | FW | (Latvia) LVA | A. Ganus |
| — | FW | (Latvia) LVA | A. Maksimovs |
