= Latvian football league system =

The Latvian football league system, also known as the football pyramid, is a series of interconnected leagues for men's association football clubs in Latvia. The system has a hierarchical format with promotion and relegation between leagues at different levels, allowing even the smallest club the theoretical possibility of ultimately rising to the very top of the system, the Latvian Higher League. Below that are levels 2–4 organised by the Latvian Football Federation.

The exact number of clubs varies from year to year as clubs join and leave leagues, merge, or fold altogether, but the existence of a total of 8 divisions within the 4 league levels, and an estimated average of 10 clubs per division implies that approximately 80 clubs are members of a league in the Latvian men's football league system.

The pyramid for women's football in Latvia runs separately to the men's structure and consists of two tiers.

== History ==
The first all-national Latvian championship, which succeeded the Riga Football League and other regional leagues first established in times of the Russian Empire, was organised in 1927, which lasted until the Soviet occupation of Latvia in 1940. After World War II, between 1945 and 1991, the championship of Soviet Latvia was the main footballing competition in the Latvian SSR.

With Latvia regaining full independence in August 1991, the newly established Latvian Football Federation (LFF) decided to reorganise its competitions within the current Latvian football league system from 1992, though minor format changes have occurred since then. The same year, Latvia returned to FIFA and became a member of UEFA.

== About the system ==
The system consists of a pyramid of leagues, bound together by the principle of promotion and relegation. A certain number of the most successful clubs in each league can rise to a higher league, whilst those that finish the season near or at the bottom of their league can be sent down a level. In addition to sporting performance, promotion is usually contingent on meeting criteria set by the higher league, especially concerning appropriate facilities, finances, and travel accommodations.

In theory, the league system makes it possible for a lowly local amateur club to achieve annual promotions and within a few years rise to the pinnacle of the Latvian football structure and become champions of the Latvian Higher League. While this may be unlikely in practice (at the very least, in the short run), there certainly is significant movement within the pyramid. Notably, FK RFS and Valmiera FC won promotion from the Latvian First League in 2015 and 2017, respectively, and went on to become Higher League champions in 2021 and 2022, respectively.

The top two levels contain one division each and are nationwide in scope. Below this, the third level is more parallel in scope, while the fourth division contains an even greater number of smaller divisions which cover more minor geographical areas.

== Structure ==
- Latvian Higher League (Tonybet Virslīga, level 1, 10 teams);
- LVBET League (LVBET Līga, level 2, 14 teams);
- Altero.lv Second League (Altero.lv LIIGA, level 3):
  - 2 regional divisions (A and B group) with 8 teams in each, 16 teams in total;
- Dali Dali Third League (Dali Dali 3. līga, level 4):
  - 4 regional divisions (Centre, East, North, and West), for a total of ~40 teams on average, though the exact number varies per season.

While all 10 clubs in the Higher League are all full-time professional clubs, this ceases to be the case further down the football pyramid.

A semi-official Latvian Fourth League (4. līga) is a regional amateur competition organized by the Riga Football Federation, where some of the teams are reserve teams of clubs from the Third League. It is not a part of the official Latvian football pyramid.

== Promotion and relegation rules between levels ==
1. Higher League (level 1, 10 teams): The bottom team is relegated, the second-to-last team takes part in a two-legged tie against the second-placed team in the First League, with the winner remaining in/advancing to the Higher League.
2. First League (level 2, 14 teams): The top team is promoted, the second team takes part in a two-legged tie against the second-to-last-placed team in the Higher League, with the winner advancing to/remaining in the Higher League. The bottom two teams are relegated, the third-from-bottom team takes part in a two-legged tie against the third-placed team in the Second League, with the winner remaining in/advancing to the First League.
3. Second League (level 3, 2 divisions, 16 teams): The top four teams in each division advance to the nationwide Promotion group, while the bottom four advance to the Relegation group. The top two teams from the Promotion group are then promoted, while the third team takes part in a two-legged tie against the third-to-last-placed team in the First League, with the winner advancing to/remaining in the First League. The bottom four teams in the Relegation group are relegated.
4. Third League (level 4, 4 divisions, ~40 teams): The two best teams in each division (8 teams total) compete in the final tournament, which is contested in a knockout format. All semi-finalists of this tournament are automatically promoted. As this is the lowest league level of Latvian football, no relegation takes place.

== Cup eligibility ==
While membership of a league at a particular level does not affect a team's overall eligibility for the Latvian Cup, members of higher leagues are given byes into further rounds of the Cup while those competing in lower leagues must enter the competition in the earlier rounds.

== The system ==
The table below illustrates the comprehensive structure of Latvian league football.

Note: Exact numbers of clubs at every level of the league system, particularly those at lower levels, are subject to change and are current as of the 2022 season.

| Level | Total clubs (80 +-) | League(s) / division(s) | | | |
|---|---|---|---|---|---|
| 1 | 10 | Higher League; 10 clubs – 1 or 2 relegations | | | |
| 2 | 14 | First League; 14 clubs – 1 or 2 promotions, 2 or 3 relegations | | | |
| 3 | 16 | Second League East; 8 clubs – 0 to 3 promotions (2 to 3 nationwide), 0 to 4 relegations (4 nationwide) | | Second League West; 8 clubs – 0 to 3 promotions (2 to 3 nationwide), 0 to 4 relegations (4 nationwide) | |
| 4 | 37 | Third League Centre; 10 clubs – 0 to 2 promotions (4 nationwide) (Note: Promotion to either the Second League East or Second League West is based on geographic factors.) | Third League East; 9 clubs – 0 to 2 promotions (4 nationwide) | Third League North; 10 clubs – 0 to 2 promotions (4 nationwide) | Third League West; 8 clubs – 0 to 2 promotions (4 nationwide) |

== See also ==
- League system
- List of association football competitions
