= 1925 Latvian Football Championship =

Latvian Football Championships
- Champions: RFK
- Matches played: 15
- Goals scored: 67 (4.47 per match)
- Average goals/game: 4.47
- All statistics correct as of 24 June 2016.

Statistics of Latvian Higher League in the 1925 season.

== Overview ==
RFK won the championship.

== League standings ==
Pos	Team	Pld	W	D	L	GF	GA	GD	Pts
1	RFK	5	4	1	0	23	5	+18	9
2	JKS	5	4	0	1	15	6	+9	8
3	LSB	5	3	0	2	11	16	−5	6
4	Amatieris	5	2	1	2	7	7	0	5
5	Kaiserwald	5	1	0	4	8	19	−11	2
6	ASK	5	0	0	5	3	14	−11	0

Source: rsssf.com

2nd stage: RFK [Riga] – Olimpija [Liepaja] 4–3
