= Andris Lapsa =

Latvian footballer

Personal information
- Date of birth: 23 April 1968 (age 58)
- Position: Defender

Senior career*
Years	Team	Apps	(Gls)
–1989	Zvejnieks Liepāja		
1989–1990	FSK Daugava 90		
1991	FK Pārdaugava		
1993	DAG Rīga		
1994	Vidus Rīga		
1994–1995	FK Pārdaugava		
1995–1996	FC Lantana Tallinn		
1997–1999	FK Ventspils		

International career
1998	Latvia	1	(0)
- * Club domestic league appearances and goals

Andris Lapsa (born 23 April 1968) is a retired Latvian football defender.
