= Igors Korabļovs =

Latvian footballer

Personal information
- Full name: Igors Korabļovs
- Date of birth: 23 November 1974 (age 51)
- Place of birth: Riga, Soviet Union (now Republic of Latvia)
- Height: 1.74 m (5 ft 9 in)
- Position: Defender

Team information
- Current team: FB Gulbene
- Number: 18

Senior career*
Years	Team	Apps	(Gls)
1994–1995	Olimps Riga	43	(6)
1996–1998	FK Daugava Riga	71	(2)
1999–2001	FK Riga	53	(0)
2002–2004	FK Ventspils	78	(3)
2005	FK Jurmala	13	(19)
2005–2006	Kryvbas Kryvyi Rih	20	(1)
2006–2008	FK Riga	60	(0)
2009–2010	FC Daugava Riga	23	(0)
2010–	FB Gulbene	107	(2)

International career^{‡}
1999–2006	Latvia	21	(0)

Managerial career
- 2010–2012: FB Gulbene (assistant manager)
- 2013–: FB Gulbene
- * Club domestic league appearances and goals as of 2 July 2013 ‡ National team caps and goals as of 2 July 2013

Igors Korabļovs (born 23 November 1974 in Riga) is a Latvian football defender, currently playing for FB Gulbene-2005 in the Latvian Higher League. He is also working as the manager of the club.

Korabļovs has previously played for clubs like FK Daugava Riga, FK Ventspils and FC Kryvbas Kryvyi Rih. He played his first match for Latvia in 1998 and participated at Euro 2004.
