= Hermanis Saltups =

Latvian footballer and doctor

Hermanis Saltups (1901–1968) was a Latvian football goalkeeper. While playing with JKS Riga, Saltups became one of the footballers who participated in the first ever international game for Latvia national football team (against Estonia on 24 September 1922). A few weeks after his only international game, he left for Germany to pursue studies of medicine. In later years, Saltups was quite known in Latvia as a doctor.
