= Latvian Third League =

Fourth tier of association football

Dali Dali 3.līga
- Founded: 2020
- Country: Latvia
- Number of clubs: ~40 (varies by season)
- Level on pyramid: 4
- Promotion to: Altero.lv LIIGA
- Domestic cup: Latvian Cup
- Current champions: FK Liepāja-2/LFS
- Website: Latvian Football Federation

The Latvian Third League (Latvian: 3. līga), also known as the Dali Dali 3. līga for sponsorhip reasons since 2023, is the fourth tier of football in Latvia. It is organised by the Latvian Football Federation.

== History ==
In 2019, the Latvian Football Federation changed the Latvian football league system by expanding it to a fourth tier, the Third League. The aim was to greatly reduce the number of teams in the Second League and increase the prestige of the higher levels of the league system. Due to the COVID-19 pandemic in Latvia, the inaugural 2020 season did not fully proceed as planned. The first edition of the Third League, held in accordance with the newly established format, took place in 2021.

== Competition format ==
=== Regional stage ===
There are four regional divisions (West, Center, North, and East) in the Third League, each containing approximately 10 teams (though the exact number in each division varies by season), which must play home and away games against their regional opponents. From each region, two teams advance to the promotion round, whereas the other teams do not continue the season. This stage of the league is typically contested from April to September.

As this is the lowest level of Latvian football, no relegation takes place within the league.

=== Promotion stage ===
The promotion round involves additional matches between the top four teams of each regional group (A and B), allowing six of the best teams to be promoted to the Second League at the conclusion of the season. This takes place in a knockout format, starting from the quarterfinals. The teams contest additional matches in order to determine the exact placement of each team and the league winners.

Until the 2025 season, the promotion round involved matches between the top two teams of each regional division, allowing four of the best teams to be promoted, but the rules were changed since the expansion of the Second League to 20 teams starting from the 2026 season. Since 2026, the six best teams from the Third League are promoted to the Second League.

== Past Third League winners ==
Season	Winner	Runner-up	Third place
2022	JDFS Alberts-2	Ogre United	FK Krāslava
2023	SK Super Nova-2	JFC Jelgava	FK Union Riga
2024	FK Līvāni	Saldus/Leevon-2	Rīgas Futbola skola
2025	FK Liepāja-2/LFS	FK Krāslava/Daugavpils-2	Babītes SK
