= Harijs Lazdiņš =

Latvian footballer

Harijs Lazdiņš (25 July 1910 in Liepāja – 23 August 1988 in Kingston, Ontario) was a Latvian football goalkeeper who played for Olimpija Liepāja and Latvia national football team in 1920s-1930s.

== Biography ==
Lazdiņš made his debut for the top football club in Liepāja in 1928 as Olimpija Liepāja won its second Latvian league title. In the first year Lazdiņš was mainly the backup goalkeeper behind K.Minsterjānis but in 1929 he already was the number one goalkeeper for Olimpija.

Through the entire 1930s Lazdiņš played rarely was replaced in the goal of Olimpija and was considered one of the best goalkeepers in the country. He was tall and rarely made spectacular jumps but he always played without fear and as the first of Latvian goalkeepers started participating in playing outside the penalty area. Lazdiņš was the most popular footballer of Olimpija of his era.

Lazdiņš made 16 appearances for Latvia national football team, after matches against Poland, Germany and Sweden international football specialists praised him as a European class goalkeeper. The brightest season in his career came in 1936 when he managed to keep his goal shut in half of the games in the Latvian Virsliga and played 5 matches for Latvia as it won four times and played one draw. With Olimpija Lazdiņš played from 1927 to 1944.

After World War II he ended up in Germany. There he played with TSV Schwaben Augsburg in 1946 and with FC Gundelfingen under management of his former Latvia national teammate Vladimirs Bērziņš in 1947. In 1948 Lazdiņš played with RFC Liege in Belgium. Afterwards he settled in Canada and played football in St Catharines.
