= Union Riga =

Latvian football club

Union
- Full name: Rīgas "Unions"
- Founded: 1907 (re-founded 2022)
- Dissolved: 1939
- Ground: Union Stadium, Riga
Home colours

Union Riga was a football club established in Riga in 1907 and the second oldest club of the country after the Riga British Football Club. It was the winner of the Riga football league in 1910. In the period of independence of Latvia between the world wars, Union played in the Latvian Higher League for several years. Being essentially a sports club of Baltic Germans, Union was disestablished in 1939 with the repatriation of Baltic Germans.

A team named FK Union, that pays homage to the original club, was founded in 2022 and currently plays in the Latvian Second League.

The home ground of the original club was Union Stadium ("Union" stadions) on Elizabetes iela in central Riga, where since 1974 the World Trade Center Riga office building stands.

== History ==
=== Historic team ===
The Riga cycling club Union was founded in 1893. A football section of the club was opened in 1907 – shortly after British FC Riga, thus Union was the second football club to be formed on the territory of Latvia. In the first years of its existence there was a tense rivalry between Union and BFC – the former being a mostly German side and the latter – a club for which played entirely Britons. In 1910 Union was one of the three sides to play in the newly founded Riga Football League – alongside BFC and Ķeizarmežs (a second German side). BFC won the tournament. However, the British team was later disqualified and Union declared the winner. Union won the first Riga Football Cup that was also played in 1910. Union won the second Riga league title in 1912, they were also twice second in the league – in 1911 and 1915. The most significant prewar-footballers in the Union team were Harold Trevenen Hall and Herberts Baumanis. The former was called "the father of Latvian football" as the first president of the Latvian Football Union, while the latter was later one of the leading football officials in Latvia. Another footballer worth mentioning to play for Union in its early years was Česlavs Stančiks.

Because of World War I and the struggle for independence football ceased to be played regularly in Latvia until 1919–1920. Union was among the sports clubs to be restored in the independent Latvia and it participated in the first restored Riga championship in 1921, however due to an early winter the season was not finished. In the next years competition Union finished fourth in the top tier of the Riga championship (out of 5 teams). Several top players left Union for ASK Riga after the season and the following year Union finished last in the league and was relegated to a lower level.

Union played in the second Riga league division until 1927 when the Virslīga was established – a league to hold football clubs from both Riga and other cities of Latvia. Thus the top teams from Class A of Riga league were promoted to Virslīga and Union was among the teams to play in the new Class A. In 1929 Union finished second in Class A (with the same number of points as Riga Wanderer). It gave the club the right to play in play-offs for a spot in the expanded Virslīga. Union won its play-off matches and was to compete in Virslīga for the first time in 1930.

In its first year in the top league Union finished fourth (it was in the second place in the league after the first half of the season) and improved by one position the next year – winning its one and only Latvian league medals. The following years the clubs fortune started to decline and in 1935 it faced relegation from Virslīga after an especially disappointing season. Union played in the Riga first league until 1939 when the club was disbanded when Baltic Germans repatriated to Germany.

=== Modern history ===
In February 2022, Bogdans Ņesterenko and Voldemārs Baroniņš founded FK Union, which considers itself an unofficial successor of the original club, using its foundation year in the team crest, and entered the Latvian Third League Central Zone. In 2023, FK Union won 3rd place in the Third League finals, winning promotion to the 2024 Latvian Second League. Its home ground is the RTU stadions (Riga Technical University Stadium), the training ground – Riga Wilhelm Ostwald Secondary School Stadium.

== Notable players ==
There were several players from Union who played for Latvia national football team however out of those several stand out – Jānis Bebris was one of the all-time best Latvian goalkeepers who later played in the French Division 1 after World War II. Bebris played for Union for three years – from 1933 to 1935. Another significant footballer to play for Union was Vladimirs Bērziņš – one of the most capped pre-war Latvian footballers (he played with Union for 2 years – from 1925 to 1926). However the symbol of Union's football club was Ēriks Skadiņš who represented it through all the hardships of the clubs life, giving more than 15 years of his life to the side, representing it from 1922 to 1939.

- Jānis Bebris
- Vladimirs Bērziņš
- Česlavs Stančiks
- Harijs Fogelis
- Georgs Kabuls
- Jūlijs Lindenbergs
- Ferdinands Neibergs
- Aleksandrs Roga
- Indriķis Reinbahs
- Ēriks Skadiņš
- Juris Skadiņš
- Alfrēds Verners
