= Riga Vanderer =

Latvian football club

Riga Vanderer (sometimes written as Wanderer, in later years – Rīgas Vilki, also – RV) was a Latvian football club that was founded in 1927, disbanded in 1940, restored a year later and disbanded again in 1944.

== History ==
=== Founding ===
The decision of founding the new sports club was made by Arthur William Macferson, the former consul general of United Kingdom in Latvia after a conflict of interests involving the Latvia national team sportsman in football and bandy Arvīds Jurgens. October 21, 1927 is considered to be the foundation date of the club. The newly founded sports club at first promised to work mostly in raising its own young footballers. However, almost the entire first selection squad of Vanderer in the early years was made up of already known and experienced footballers from other Riga sports clubs. As the majority of the Vanderer footballers in its first squad came from RFK, there started a deep rivalry between these two clubs and several of their matches ended in violence.

=== The first match ===
Riga Vanderer played its first ever game against Sport Tallinn on May 13, 1928. The following players represented Vander in its first ever official match were: Arvīds Jurgens, Fēlikss Zandbergs, Ādolfs Sīmanis, Blūmentāls, Česlavs Stančiks, Harijs Fogelis, Aleksandrs Ābrams, Emīls Urbāns, Valdis Plade, Aleksejs Andrejevs and Veinbergs. The Tallinn club won the match 3–0.

=== Road to the higher league ===
As a new club despite it having several national team footballers in the squad Vanderers had to start from the very bottom – that is the level B Riga tournament. In the B class tournament there proved to be no competition for the experienced Vanderers team which won all 8 matches in 1928 A the B class champion Vanderers had to play against the weakest A class side – Amatieris ("Amateur") which also was no competitor for Vanderers and was beat 7–1. A year later Vanderer (with two further former Rīgas FK footballers – Alfons Novickis and Vladimirs Svistuņenko in the squad) won the A class tournament and because the Latvian Higher League was extended, it earned a place there without additional play-off matches.

=== The higher league years ===
There was no question whether Vanderer was ready to play in the higher league, as it had enough experienced footballers in the squad, however its top-flight début was even more impressive than most expected – Vanderer finished third in the league, mostly thanks to the tight defensive triangle – Jurgens, Sīmanis and Rūdolfs Kundrāts (the latter had joined Vanderer from LSB Riga).

The 1931 season was less successful but in 1932 Vanderers got the closest to winning the gold of the Latvian league in its history. Despite having lost Arvīds Jurgens to its main rivals ASK Riga (but at the same time it had gained national team forward Alberts Šeibelis from RFK) that year Vanderer finished with the same number of points as ASK. Therefore, a golden match was necessary, and in it ASK proved to be the stronger side by winning 3–1.

Vanderer could not better its 1932 result over the years, yet it repeated the second-place finish in 1934, but the margin between Vanderer and the title winners RFK was big. The next years showed a decline in the league performance for Vanderer that didn't earn any more league medals after 1934. The performance was much better in the cup tournaments. Vanderer reached its first Riga Football Cup final in 1933 where it was beaten by ASK Riga, but the next year it won its first cup and a second victory in the tournament came in 1936 when it was already renamed as the Latvian Cup. However the most important cup victory for Riga Vanderer is considered the one it achieved in 1938 when the Latvian Cup was already a very prestigious tournament in which participated all the best Latvian football clubs. In the autumn of 1938 the club changed its name from the foreign-sounding Vanderer to the Latvian Rīgas Vilki ("Riga Wolves"), in short – RV.

The main problem for RV for several years in the 1930s was lack of a reliable first choice goalkeeper after Jurgens had left it. Degners, Zakss, Strautmanis, Katlaps, Jūlijs Lindenbergs (a former national team goalkeeper) were tried but none of them proved to be good enough. That changed in 1936 when Jānis Bebris from Union Riga joined the club, thus filling the weakest position in the Vanderer squad. The best goalscorers for RV in the second half of the 1930s were Hugo Vītols and Alfrēds Verners, Hermanis Jēnihs and Alberts Šeibelis (the latter spent a couple years with V. Ķuze before it was disbanded). The most long-lasting member of Vanderer was Ādolfs Sīmanis who played for the club from its very first days until 1940.

=== Dissolution ===
In 1940 after Latvia was occupied and annexed by the Soviet Union there were major changes in the sports club structure in Latvia and most of the former clubs were disbanded, and RV was one of those. Its footballers joined different newly founded clubs of the Soviet system: RDKA Riga (Jānis Bebris), FK Dinamo Riga (Ādolfs Sīmanis), Spartaks Rīga (Alberts Šeibelis), RGK Riga (Šeino). Meanwhile, several other former RV footballers had repatriated to Germany in 1939, including former national team players Ēriks Brēde and Ēriks Bēze.

=== During WW2 ===
RV was restored in 1941 by the German occupation forces and in 1942 the club competed again in the Riga championship. The restored Vanderer squad contained most of its former stars including Bebris, Šeibelis, Juris Skadiņš and future Daugava Rīga coach Vadims Ulbergs. Only the top four teams from the Riga tournament qualified to play in the Latvian Higher League and RV was the first on the wrong side of the line. RV returned to the higher league in 1943 but it wasn't unable to compete with stronger sides any more. In 1944 when the war interrupted the football tournament RV was in the last place in the Latvian league.

When the Soviet army re-entered the territory of Latvia in 1944 RV was disbanded the second and final time.

== Honours ==
- Latvian Higher League:
  - Runners-up: 2 (1932, 1934)
- Riga Football Cup:
  - Winners: 2 (1934, 1936)
- Latvian Cup:
  - Winners: 1 (1938)

== Managerial history ==
- (Austria) Karl Kurz (1928)
- (Austria) Peter Tandler (1931)
- (Latvia) Voldemārs Plade (1936)
- Zigmārs Voldemārs (1937)
