= Riga Football Cup =

Former football competition in Latvia (1925–1936)

Riga Football Cup (Latvian: Rīgas Kauss futbolā) was a knockout tournament held in Latvian football from 1910 to 1913 and then from 1925 to 1936. Clubs from cities other than Riga were allowed to participate in the tournament from 1925. In 1937 it was replaced by the Latvian Football Cup.

The tournament was the main football competition in Latvia until 1922, when it was succeeded by the Latvian Football Championship, which in turn was reorganized as the Latvian Higher League (Virslīga) in 1927.

Year	Winner	Runner-up	Score
1910	Union Riga	British Football Club	1 - 0
1911	Britannia		
1912	SV Kaiserwald		
1913	SV Kaiserwald		
Interrupted due to World War I and the Latvian War of Independence
1924	Rīgas FK	ASK Rīga	3 - 3 (6 - 3 in OT)
1925	Rīgas FK	JKS Riga	1 - 0
1926	LSB Riga	Amatieris	4 - 1
1927	no tournament held		
1928	Olimpija Liepāja	ASK Riga	4 - 1
1929	Olimpija Liepāja	Amatieris	9 - 0 (first match - 3 - 3 )
1930	Olimpija Liepāja	Rīgas FK	1 - 0
1931	no tournament held		
1932	no tournament held		
1933	ASK Riga	Riga Vanderer	4 - 1
1934	Riga Vanderer	V. Ķuze	3 - 0
1935	Rīgas FK	Hakoah Riga	1 - 0
1936	Riga Vanderer	ASK Rīga	5 - 2
