= RFK Riga =

Historic Latvian football club

The Riga Football Club (Rīgas futbola klubs or Rīgas Futbolklubs, RFK or Rīgas FK) was a Latvian football club which was founded on December 14, 1923 in Riga. It was the most successful Latvian football club in the 1920s and 30s, winning the Latvian Higher League and the precursor Latvian Championship eight times between 1924 and 1940. The club was the base team for the Latvia national football team in its early years. It disbanded after World War II.

In the 1920s, the club also had a basketball section, which won the Latvian Basketball League in 1926 and 1927.

== History ==
The idea for its creation came about in 1922 with the goal of uniting Latvian players in a team which could beat the mostly-German Ķeizarmežs. The founder and manager was Juris Rēdlihs, one of the most active football organizers in Latvia. In 1923, most of the best Latvian footballers from JKS moved to Riga FK. Those included Hermanis Saltups, Ašmanis, Eihmanis, Roga, Bone, Sokolovs, Zemīts and the brothers Edvīns, Rūdolfs and Arvīds Bārda.

In its first season in the Riga Championship, Riga FK finished second – one point behind Ķeizarmežs. In 1924, when Riga FK acquired a new manager who also managed the Latvia national football team – Willy Malousek from Austria. Because it was prohibited to have foreign citizens playing in the Latvian league for that season, Ķeizarmežs didn't play in 1924. Riga FC easily beat its closest rivals – ASK Riga in the Riga championship and beat the province champions from Cēsis 5–1, winning its first Latvian championship. In 1925 and 1926 Riga FK won its second and third titles.

In 1927, when the Latvian Higher League was launched, Olimpija Liepāja took gold, leaving RFC with second place. Several players (including Arvīds Jurgens, Voldemārs Plade, Česlavs Stančiks and Aleksandrs Ābrams) left Riga FK during this season in order to found a new team – Riga Vanderers. Olimpija also beat RFK in the battle for title in 1928 and 1929.

In the 1930s, the emergence of the best pre-war Latvian footballer, Ēriks Pētersons, once again brought good results for Riga FK – with titles in 1930 and 1931. In 1932, however, the team finished in its worst position so far – 3rd behind ASK and Riga Vanderers. The next titles for RK came in 1934 and 1935, when the team beat its competition by a large margin.

The last time that RFK won the Latvian title was in 1940, just months before Soviet occupation of Latvia. RFK was then disbanded with its best players joining FK Dinamo Rīga. In 1941, with the German occupation of Latvia, Riga FK and other Latvian football teams were restored and participated in the 1942–1944 championships. The fate of former RFK squad was very diverse, with some continuing to play football in Soviet-occupied Latvia, while others emigrated and were killed in World War II.

== Later teams with related names ==
In 1992, the former FK Auda was renamed Riga FK (also RFK; RFK/Auda in 1994) but, after a couple of seasons without serious results, it was renamed Auda again in 1995. The similarly named FK Rīga operated from 1999 to 2009.

In 2014, the Riga Football Club (Riga FC) was founded, although it has not used the RFK brand.

Since 2016, the Rīgas Futbola klubs (also Rīgas FK or R.F.K.) name is carried by the RFK Eirobaltija football youth academy run by the Sports Association "Rīgas Futbola klubs", originally founded in 2004. Recently it has adopted a crest, nearly identical to the one used by the RFK of the 1930s. Along youth teams starting from U-6, the club also fields a RFK U-19 team in the Latvian Third League Central Zone starting from 2025 (since the 2026 season - RFK/RFS, in partnership with the Higher League club FK RFS).

== Honours ==
- Latvia top league:
  - Winners: 8 (1924–1926,1930–1931,1934–1935,1940)
  - Runners-up: 6 (1923,1927–1929,1933,1938)
- Latvian Cup:
  - Winners: 2 (1937, 1939)
