= Olimpia Liepaja =

Defunct Latvian football club (Olimpija)

FK Olimpija Liepāja
- Full name: Futbola klubs "Olimpija"
- Founded: 1922 (Re-Founded 1990)
- Dissolved: 1940 (Re-Dissolution 1993)
- Ground: Liepāja, Latvia
Home colours	Away colours

Olimpija Liepāja was a Latvian football club. It was based in Liepāja and founded in 1922.

It won the Latvian Top League on seven occasions between 1927 and 1939, becoming the first non-Riga team to win the title. Otto Fischer moved in 1936 to Latvia, where he coached the team until 1940. Under him, the team did not lose a game as they won the League in Fischer's first season, and again in 1938 and 1939.

After the Soviet occupation of Latvia in 1940, the club was dissolved. It was briefly revived during the Nazi occupation of the Baltic states from 1941 to 1944. Fischer, who had stayed in Liepāja, was killed by the Nazis during the Liepāja massacres. With the return of the Soviet occupation, the players of Olimpija formed the core of the newly created Dinamo Liepāja and Sarkanais Metalurgs teams.

The name of Olimpija was briefly adopted by the club FK Liepājas Metalurgs in from 1990 to 1993.

== Honours ==
- Latvian Top League:
  - Winners: 7 (1927–1929,1933, 1936, 1938–1939)
