= Progress, Russia =

Progress (Russian: Прогре́сс) is the name of several inhabited localities in Russia.

== Modern localities ==
=== Republic of Adygea ===
As of 2012, one rural locality in the Republic of Adygea bears this name:

- Progress, Republic of Adygea, a khutor in Giaginsky District; 44°52′N 40°12′E

=== Amur Oblast ===
As of 2012, one urban locality in Amur Oblast bears this name:

- Progress, Amur Oblast, a work settlement; administratively incorporated as an urban okrug

=== Republic of Bashkortostan ===
As of 2012, three rural localities in the Republic of Bashkortostan bear this name:

- Progress, Bizhbulyaksky District, Republic of Bashkortostan, a village in Kamensky Selsoviet of Bizhbulyaksky District; 53°34′N 54°1′E
- Progress, Kugarchinsky District, Republic of Bashkortostan, a khutor in Tlyaumbetovsky Selsoviet of Kugarchinsky District; 52°37′N 56°21′E
- Progress, Yanaulsky District, Republic of Bashkortostan, a selo in Kisak-Kainsky Selsoviet of Yanaulsky District; 56°15′N 54°45′E

=== Bryansk Oblast ===
As of 2012, five rural localities in Bryansk Oblast bear this name:

- Progress, Klimovsky District, Bryansk Oblast, a settlement in Novoropsky Rural Administrative Okrug of Klimovsky District; 52°12′N 32°18′E
- Progress, Komarichsky District, Bryansk Oblast, a settlement in Litizhsky Rural Administrative Okrug of Komarichsky District; 52°19′N 34°56′E
- Progress, Mglinsky District, Bryansk Oblast, a settlement in Vysoksky Rural Administrative Okrug of Mglinsky District; 53°1′N 32°43′E
- Progress, Pochepsky District, Bryansk Oblast, a settlement in Valuyetsky Rural Administrative Okrug of Pochepsky District; 52°42′N 33°24′E
- Progress, Trubchevsky District, Bryansk Oblast, a settlement in Teletsky Rural Administrative Okrug of Trubchevsky District; 52°36′N 33°45′E

=== Kabardino-Balkar Republic ===
As of 2012, one rural locality in the Kabardino-Balkar Republic bears this name:

- Progress, Kabardino-Balkar Republic, a selo in Prokhladnensky District; 43°57′N 43°55′E

=== Kaliningrad Oblast ===
As of 2012, one rural locality in Kaliningrad Oblast bears this name:

- Progress, Kaliningrad Oblast, a settlement under the administrative jurisdiction of the town of district significance of Pravdinsk in Pravdinsky District

=== Kaluga Oblast ===
As of 2012, two rural localities in Kaluga Oblast bear this name:

- Progress, Khvastovichsky District, Kaluga Oblast, a selo in Khvastovichsky District
- Progress, Kuybyshevsky District, Kaluga Oblast, a village in Kuybyshevsky District

=== Kemerovo Oblast ===
As of 2012, one rural locality in Kemerovo Oblast bears this name:

- Progress, Kemerovo Oblast, a village in Vaganovskaya Rural Territory of Promyshlennovsky District; 54°45′N 85°21′E

=== Krasnodar Krai ===
As of 2012, four rural localities in Krasnodar Krai bear this name:

- Progress, Sochi, Krasnodar Krai, a selo in Razdolsky Rural Okrug under the administrative jurisdiction of Khostinsky City District of the City of Sochi; 43°35′N 39°50′E
- Progress, Gulkevichsky District, Krasnodar Krai, a khutor in Otrado-Kubansky Rural Okrug of Gulkevichsky District; 45°16′N 40°47′E
- Progress, Novokubansky District, Krasnodar Krai, a settlement in Kovalevsky Rural Okrug of Novokubansky District; 45°12′N 40°59′E
- Progress, Temryuksky District, Krasnodar Krai, a settlement in Novotamansky Rural Okrug of Temryuksky District; 45°10′N 36°51′E

=== Krasnoyarsk Krai ===
As of 2012, one rural locality in Krasnoyarsk Krai bears this name:

- Progress, Krasnoyarsk Krai, a village in Glyadensky Selsoviet of Nazarovsky District

=== Kurgan Oblast ===
As of 2012, one rural locality in Kurgan Oblast bears this name:

- Progress, Kurgan Oblast, a selo in Klyuchevskoy Selsoviet of Shadrinsky District; 56°8′N 63°37′E

=== Nizhny Novgorod Oblast ===
As of 2012, one rural locality in Nizhny Novgorod Oblast bears this name:

- Progress, Nizhny Novgorod Oblast, a settlement in Permeyevsky Selsoviet of Bolsheboldinsky District; 54°57′N 45°7′E

=== Novgorod Oblast ===
As of 2012, one rural locality in Novgorod Oblast bears this name:

- Progress, Novgorod Oblast, a settlement in Progresskoye Settlement of Borovichsky District

=== Novosibirsk Oblast ===
As of 2012, one rural locality in Novosibirsk Oblast bears this name:

- Progress, Novosibirsk Oblast, a settlement in Novosibirsky District; 54°42′N 82°33′E

=== Oryol Oblast ===
As of 2012, four rural localities in Oryol Oblast bear this name:

- Progress (rural locality), Podgorodnensky Selsoviet, Maloarkhangelsky District, Oryol Oblast, a settlement in Podgorodnensky Selsoviet of Maloarkhangelsky District; 52°21′N 36°29′E
- Progress (rural locality), Podgorodnensky Selsoviet, Maloarkhangelsky District, Oryol Oblast, a village in Podgorodnensky Selsoviet of Maloarkhangelsky District; 52°23′N 36°29′E
- Progress, Mtsensky District, Oryol Oblast, a settlement in Vysokinsky Selsoviet of Mtsensky District; 53°4′N 36°42′E
- Progress, Uritsky District, Oryol Oblast, a settlement in Lunacharsky Selsoviet of Uritsky District; 52°51′N 35°45′E

=== Penza Oblast ===
As of 2012, one rural locality in Penza Oblast bears this name:

- Progress, Penza Oblast, a selo in Makhalinsky Selsoviet of Kuznetsky District

=== Rostov Oblast ===
As of 2012, four rural localities in Rostov Oblast bear this name:

- Progress, Salsky District, Rostov Oblast, a settlement in Rybasovskoye Rural Settlement of Salsky District; 46°26′N 41°41′E
- Progress, Vesyolovsky District, Rostov Oblast, a khutor in Krasnooktyabrskoye Rural Settlement of Vesyolovsky District; 47°3′N 40°57′E
- Progress, Volgodonskoy District, Rostov Oblast, a settlement in Progressovskoye Rural Settlement of Volgodonskoy District; 47°25′N 41°47′E
- Progress, Yegorlyksky District, Rostov Oblast, a khutor in Yegorlykskoye Rural Settlement of Yegorlyksky District; 46°39′N 40°31′E

=== Ryazan Oblast ===
As of 2012, one rural locality in Ryazan Oblast bears this name:

- Progress, Ryazan Oblast, a settlement in Troitsky Rural Okrug of Sarayevsky District

=== Samara Oblast ===
As of 2012, one rural locality in Samara Oblast bears this name:

- Progress, Samara Oblast, a settlement in Khvorostyansky District

=== Saratov Oblast ===
As of 2012, one rural locality in Saratov Oblast bears this name:

- Progress, Saratov Oblast, a settlement in Ivanteyevsky District

=== Smolensk Oblast ===
As of 2012, one rural locality in Smolensk Oblast bears this name:

- Progress, Smolensk Oblast, a village in Tumanovskoye Rural Settlement of Vyazemsky District

=== Stavropol Krai ===
As of 2012, three rural localities in Stavropol Krai bear this name:

- Progress, Budyonnovsky District, Stavropol Krai, a settlement in Iskrovsky Selsoviet of Budyonnovsky District
- Progress, Kirovsky District, Stavropol Krai, a settlement in Zolsky Selsoviet of Kirovsky District
- Progress, Kochubeyevsky District, Stavropol Krai, a khutor in Novoderevensky Selsoviet of Kochubeyevsky District

=== Sverdlovsk Oblast ===
As of 2012, one rural locality in Sverdlovsk Oblast bears this name:

- Progress, Sverdlovsk Oblast, a settlement under the administrative jurisdiction of the City of Pervouralsk

=== Tambov Oblast ===
As of 2012, two rural localities in Tambov Oblast bear this name:

- Progress, Uvarovsky District, Tambov Oblast, a settlement in Berezovsky Selsoviet of Uvarovsky District
- Progress, Znamensky District, Tambov Oblast, a village in Pokrovo-Marfinsky Selsoviet of Znamensky District

=== Republic of Tatarstan ===
As of 2012, one rural locality in the Republic of Tatarstan bears this name:

- Progress, Republic of Tatarstan, a settlement in Bugulminsky District

=== Tula Oblast ===
As of 2012, one rural locality in Tula Oblast bears this name:

- Progress, Tula Oblast, a settlement in Bogucharovsky Rural Okrug of Kireyevsky District

=== Tyumen Oblast ===
As of 2012, one rural locality in Tyumen Oblast bears this name:

- Progress, Tyumen Oblast, a village in Pamyatninsky Rural Okrug of Yalutorovsky District

=== Vologda Oblast ===
As of 2012, one rural locality in Vologda Oblast bears this name:

- Progress, Vologda Oblast, a village in Nikolsky Selsoviet of Sheksninsky District

=== Voronezh Oblast ===
As of 2012, one rural locality in Voronezh Oblast bears this name:

- Progress, Voronezh Oblast, a settlement in Rubashevskoye Rural Settlement of Anninsky District

== Alternative names ==
- Progress, alternative name of Elvg, a settlement in Elvginskaya Rural Administration of Yashkulsky District in the Republic of Kalmykia; 46°21′N 44°54′E

== See also ==
- Progress (spacecraft), a Russian, formerly Soviet, cargo spacecapsule
