= Flags and coats of arms of cities, villages and districts of Adygea =

This page lists the city flags and coats of arms of Adygea, Russia. It is a part of the list of city and coats of arms flags of Russia, which is split into federal subjects due to its size.

== Cities and towns ==
| City/Town | Flag | Arms | Enactment Date | Description | Ref. |
|---|---|---|---|---|---|
| Adygeysk | | | 5 September 2019 | Banner of arms. The oak tree is a sacred tree to the Circassians. It is said that it can give people inflexibility, strength, constancy, longevity, wisdom and endurance. The Green represents hope, abundance, freedom and joy. Its branches and leaves represents original settlements that were merged by the Krasnodar Reservoir to become the Adygeysk. Yellow symbolizes nobility, power, wealth, faith, justice, mercy and humility. Yellow is also the colour of the steppes. Green and yellow are Adygea's federal subject colours. The coat of arms contains two red bulls, symbolling the origin of the name of the town. According to the Adyghe, they stand for fertility since the 3rd millennium BC (Maykop is home to a lost archaeological culture). During the Soviet era, the bulls represent an emerging power. Red stands for courage and fearlessness. | |
| Maykop | | | Arms: 7 March 1972; Flag: 20 June 2008 | Banner of arms. Red for courage and beauty and yellow for wealth and prosperity. The apple tree represents apple farming in various valleys in the outskirts of Maykop (which is beneficial till this day) which gave the city its name from the Adyghe language. The bull heads are representations of figures of bull heads that are founded in 1897 during excavations of the Maykop mound, stored in the State Hermitage Museum in St. Petersburg. They symbolized industrial agriculture. The shamrock is a good luck symbol for fertility and a good harvest and the staff is said to give people wisdom and power. | |

== Districts ==
| Flag | Coat of arms | District | Date | Description |
|---|---|---|---|---|
| | | Giaginsky District | 14 June 2017 – today | |
| | | Koshekhablsky District | 6 December 2019 – today | |
| | | Krasnogvardeysky District | 20 October 2017 – today | |
| | | Shovgenovsky District | 11 July 2007 – today | |

== Rural localities ==
| Rural locality | Flag | Arms | Enactment Date | Description | Ref. |
|---|---|---|---|---|---|
| Giaginskaya | | | 16 February 2012 - present | Banner of arms. The shashkas in a scabbard represents the peace and courage with Giaginskaya's defence readiness and build-up. The kubanka hat represents its Cossack history. The wheat ears represent agricultural benefits of the harvest season, and the total number of ears represents the settlements that made up the rural locality. The eight-pointed star (wind rose) represents the Virgin Mary, harmony, restoration and rebirth. The star represents its position as the intersection of transport and railway lines. Blue symbolizes honour, nobility and spirituality (as it is the colour of the Virgin Mary). Blue is also the colour of the 1st Caucasus Army Corps. Yellow symbolizes wealth, stability, respect, intelligence. Red represents courage, dedication, heroism, courage, labour and blood spilled through military glory. The wavy edges represent the Giaga river. Designed by A.E. Danilchenko A.E., S.M. Dzeboev and S.V. and Chernov S.V. | |
| Dondukovskaya | | | April 26, 2017 - present | | |
| Dondukovskaya | | | October 28, 2014 - April 26, 2017 | | |
| Kelermesskaya | | | May 17, 2013 - present | | |
| Kelermesskaya | | | 22 March 2013 - May 17, 2013 | | |
| Sergiyevskoye | | | April 29, 2013 - present | | |
| Kamennomostsky | | | June 18, 2013 - present | | |
| Tulsky | | | May 31, 2011 - present | | |
| Dondukovskoye | | | June 17, 2009 - present | | |
| Zarevskoye | | | August 24, 2009 - present | | |
| Chernyshev farm | | | | Unofficial | |
