= Vladimiri =

Vladimiri is a patronymic. Notable people with the surname include:

- Paulus Vladimiri (Polish: Paweł Włodkowic; ca. 1370 – 1435), Polish scholar, jurist and rector of the Cracow Academy
- Tudor din Vladimiri (Tudor of Vladimiri)

== See also ==
- Vladimir (name)
- Vladimir (disambiguation)
- Tudor Vladimirescu
- Vladimirsky (disambiguation)
- Vladimirov
- Vladimirovo (disambiguation)
- Vladimirovich
