= Vladimirovka =

Vladimirovka may refer to:

- Vladimirovka, Oghuz, Azerbaijan
- Vladimirovka, Quba, Azerbaijan
- Vladimirovka, former name of Nizami, Sabirabad, Azerbaijan
- Vladimirovka, Russia, name of several rural localities in Russia

== See also ==
- Vladimir (disambiguation)
- Vladimirsky (disambiguation)
- Vladimirovsky
- ru:Владимировка
- Volodymyrivka, the Ukrainian language cognate
