= Tambovsky (rural locality) =

Tambovsky (Russian: Тамбо́вский; masculine), Tambovskaya (Тамбо́вская; feminine), or Tambovskoye (Тамбо́вское; neuter) is the name of several rural localities in Russia:

- Tambovsky, Republic of Adygea, a khutor in Giaginsky District of the Republic of Adygea
- Tambovsky, Kamensky District, Altai Krai, a settlement in Tolstovsky Selsoviet of Kamensky District of Altai Krai
- Tambovsky, Romanovsky District, Altai Krai, a settlement in Tambovsky Selsoviet of Romanovsky District of Altai Krai
- Tambovsky, Dukhovnitsky District, Saratov Oblast, a settlement in Dukhovnitsky District, Saratov Oblast
- Tambovsky, Pugachyovsky District, Saratov Oblast, a settlement in Pugachyovsky District, Saratov Oblast
- Tambovsky, Tambov Oblast, a settlement in Alexandrovsky Selsoviet of Rzhaksinsky District of Tambov Oblast
- Tambovskoye, Kabardino-Balkar Republic, a selo in Tersky District of the Kabardino-Balkar Republic
- Tambovskoye, Kaliningrad Oblast, a settlement in Gvardeysky Rural Okrug of Bagrationovsky District of Kaliningrad Oblast
- Tambovskoye, Sakhalin Oblast, a selo in Korsakovsky District of Sakhalin Oblast
