= Vladimir =

Given name of old Slavic origin

- Pronunciation: Russian: [vlɐˈdʲimʲɪr] Bulgarian: [vlɐdiˈmir] Serbo-Croatian: [ʋlǎdimiːr]
- Gender: masculine

Origin
- Origin: Slavic
- Meaning: "of great power" (folk etymology: "ruler of the world", "ruler of peace") / "famous power", "bright and famous"

Other names
- Alternative spelling: Cyrillic: Владимир, Влади́мир, Владиміръ, Владимѣръ
- Variant forms: Wladimir, Vladimer, Vlado, Vlade, Włodzimierz, Volodymyr, Vladimiro, Uladzimir, Valdis, Waldek, Vladimira
- Related names: Waldemar, Woldemar, Voldemārs, Voldemar, Valdimar

Vladimir (Russian: Влади́мир, pre-1918 orthography: Владиміръ, Bulgarian: Владими́р) is a masculine given name of Slavic origin, widespread throughout all Slavic nations in different forms and spellings.

== Etymology ==
The Old East Slavic form of the name is Володимѣръ Volodiměr, while the Old Church Slavonic form is Vladiměr. According to Max Vasmer, the name is composed of Slavic владь vladĭ "to rule" and *mēri "great", "famous" (related to Gothic element mērs, -mir, cf. Theodemir, Valamir).

The modern (pre-1918) Russian forms Владимиръ and Владиміръ are based on the Church Slavonic one, with the replacement of мѣръ by миръ or міръ resulting from a folk etymological association with миръ "peace" or міръ "world".

The Bolshevik reform of Russian spelling in 1918 abolished the orthographic distinction between миръ (peace) and міръ (universe, world): both are now spelled as мир, so the name came to be spelled Владимир.

== History ==
An early record of this name was the name of Vladimir-Rasate (died 893), ruler of the First Bulgarian Empire.

Following the Christianization of Kievan Rus' in 988 during the reign of Vladimir the Great, the name Vladimir, along with other pagan names, was gradually replaced with Christian names, although the name Vladimir retained its popularity within the princely family in the following centuries.

Three successors of Vladimir the Great shared his given name: Vladimir II Monomakh (1053–1125), Vladimir III Mstislavich (1132–1173) and Vladimir IV Rurikovich (1187–1239). The town Volodymyr in north-western Ukraine was founded by Vladimir and is named after him. The foundation of another town, Vladimir in Russia, is usually attributed to Vladimir II Monomakh. However, some researchers argue that it was also founded by Vladimir the Great. The veneration of Vladimir the Great as a saint of the Russian Orthodox Church gave rise to the replacement of the East Slavic form of his name with the Old Church Slavonic (Old Bulgarian) one. The immense importance of Vladimir the Great as national and religious founder resulted in Vladimir becoming one of the most frequently-given Russian names.

== Variants ==
The Slavic name survives in two traditions, the Old Church Slavonic one using the vocalism Vladi- and the Old East Slavic one in the vocalism Volodi-.

The Old Church Slavonic form Vladimir (Владимир) is used in Russian, Bulgarian, Serbian, and Macedonian, borrowed into Slovenian, Croatian Vladimir, Czech and Slovak Vladimír.

The polnoglasie "-olo-" of Old East Slavic form Vladimir (Владимиръ) (probably pronounced as Volodymyr) persists in the Ukrainian form Volodymyr (Володимир), borrowed into Slovak Volodymýr.

Historical diminutive forms include: Vladimirko (Russian), Volodymyrko (Ukrainian).

In Belarusian the name is spelled Uladzimir (Uładzimir, Уладзімір) or Uladzimier (Uładzimier, Уладзімер).

In Polish, the name is spelled Włodzimierz.

In Russian, shortened and endeared versions of the name are Volodya (and variants with diminutive suffixes: Volod'ka, Volodyen'ka, Volodechka etc.), Vova (and diminutives: Vovka, Vovochka, etc.), Vovchik, Vovan. In West and South Slavic countries, other short versions are used: e.g., Vlade, Vlado, Vlada, Vladica, Vladko, Vlatko, Vlajko, Vladan, Władek, Wlodik and Włodek.

The Germanic form, Waldemar or Woldemar, is sometimes traced to Valdemar I of Denmark (1131–1182) named after his Russian maternal grandfather, Vladimir II Monomakh. The Germanic name is reflected in Latvian Voldemārs and Finnic (Finnish and Estonian) Voldemar.

The Greek form is Vladimiros (Βλαδίμηρος). The name is most common in Northern Greece especially among the Slavic speakers of Greek Macedonia. Diminutives of the name among these Slavic speakers are Vlade and Mire.

Wladimir is an alternative spelling of the name.

== People with the name ==
=== Royalty ===
Ordered chronologically

- Vladimir of Bulgaria (fl. 889–893), Knyaz (king) of Bulgaria
- Vladimir the Great (c. 958–1015), prince of Novgorod, grand Prince of Kiev, and ruler of Kievan Rus'
- Vladimir of Novgorod (1020–1052), Prince of Novgorod
- Vladimir II Monomakh (1053–1125), Grand Prince of Kievan Rus', prince of Kiev; also ruled in Rostov and Suzdal
- Vladimir II Mstislavich (1132–1173), Prince of Dorogobuzh, Vladimir, and Volyn, Slutsk, Tripolye and Grand Prince of Kiev
- Vladimir III Rurikovich (1187–1239), Prince of Pereyaslavl, Smolensk and Grand Prince of Kiev
- Vladimir the Bold (1353–1410), prince of Serpukhov, one of the principal commanders of Lithuanian–Muscovite War (1368–1372) and Battle of Kulikovo
- Vladimir of Staritsa (1533–1569), Appanage Prince of Russia, cousin to Tsar Ivan the Terrible
- Grand Duke Vladimir Alexandrovich of Russia (1847–1909)
- Vladimir Kirillovich, Grand Duke of Russia (1917–1992)

=== Presidents and prime ministers ===
- Vladimir Ivashko (1932-1994), Soviet Ukrainian politician, General Secretary of the Communist Party of the Soviet Union and Chairman of the Supreme Soviet of the Ukrainian Soviet Socialist Republic
- Vladimir Kokovtsov (1853–1943), Russian politician, prime minister of Russia from 1911 to 1914
- Vladimir Lenin (1870–1924), Russian revolutionary, head of the Russian Soviet Federative Socialist Republic, founder and first leader of the Soviet Union
- Vladimír Mečiar (born 1942), Slovak politician who served as the prime minister of Slovakia three times, from 1990 to 1991, from 1992 to 1994 and from 1994 to 1998
- Vladimir Pashkov (born 1961), Prime Minister of the Donetsk People's Republic (DPR).
- Vladimir Putin (born 1952), current president of Russia and former prime minister.
- Vladimir Špidla (born 1951), Czech politician who served as the prime minister of the Czech Republic
- Vladimir Vasilyev (politician) (born 1949), Russian politician and Head of the Republic of Dagestan
- Vladimir Voronin (born 1941), former president of Moldova

=== Religious figures ===
- Metropolitan Vladimir (disambiguation)
- Vladimir Bogoyavlensky (1848–1918), bishop of the Russian Orthodox Church, Metropolitan of Moscow and Kolomna between 1898 and 1912, Metropolitan of St. Petersburg and Ladoga between 1912 and 1915, and Metropolitan of Kiev and Gallich between 1915 and 1918
- Vladimir Gundyayev (born 1946), known as Patriarch Kirill of Moscow, Russian Orthodox bishop, Patriarch of Moscow and all Rus' and Primate of the Russian Orthodox Church

=== Military leaders ===
- Vladimir Antonov-Ovseenko (1883–1938), Ukrainian Bolshevik leader and diplomat, one of the principal commanders of October Revolution, Ukraine Offensive (1919) and Allied intervention in the Russian Civil War
- Vladimir Arshba (1958-2018), Abkhaz soldier and politician who served as the first Minister of Defence of the Republic of Abkhazia, an unrecognised state, from 1992 until 1993, one of the principal commanders of War in Abkhazia (1992-1993)
- Vladimir Baer (1853-1905), Russian captain of the Russo-Japanese War
- Vladimir Boldyrev (born 1949), Commander-in-Chief of the Russian Ground Forces, one of the principal commanders of Second Chechen War, Russo–Georgian War and Insurgency in the North Caucasus
- Vladimir Chirkin (born 1955), Russian military officer and a former commander of Russian Ground Forces, one of the principal commanders of Insurgency in the North Caucasus
- Vladimir Constantinescu (1895–1965), Romanian general in World War II, one of the principal commanders of Battle of the Caucasus
- Vladimir Cukavac (1884-1965), Serbian general holding the title of army general in the Royal Yugoslav Army, one of the principal commanders of Invasion of Yugoslavia
- Vladimir Dobrovolsky (1834-1877), Russian general of the Russo-Turkish War (1877–1878)
- Vladimir Gelfand, Soviet soldier in World War II who became known for his published war time diaries
- Vladimir Gittis (1881–1938), Soviet military commander and komkor, one of the principal commanders of Battle for the Donbas (1919) and Latvian War of Independence
- Vladimir Kondić (1863-1940), Serbian general of World War I
- Vladimir Kotlinsky (1894–1915), Russian Second Lieutenant of World War I
- Vladimir Kuroyedov (1944–2026), Russian admiral of the fleet
- Vladimir Lazarević (born 1949), Serbian general and convicted war criminal, one of the principal commanders of Kosovo War
- Vladimir Lobov (born 1935), former Soviet and Russian military commander, Chief of the General Staff of the Soviet Armed Forces in 1991, General of the Army and People's Deputy of the USSR
- Vladimir Marushevsky (1874-1951), Imperial Russian general, last chief of staff of the Russian Republic
- Vladimir May-Mayevsky (1867-1920), general in the Imperial Russian Army, one of the principal commanders of Battle for the Donbas (1919)
- Vladimir Mikhaylov (1943), Russian general, former commander-in-chief of the Russian Air Force
- Vladimir Miklukha (1853–1905), Russian captain of the Russo-Japanese War
- Vladimir Padrino López (born 1963), Venezuelan general, Minister of Defense of Venezuela from 2014 to 2026.
- Vladimir Shamanov (born 1957), retired Russian colonel general, Commander-in-Chief of the Russian Airborne Troops, one of the principal commanders of the First Chechen War, First Nagorno-Karabakh War and Russo–Georgian War, the leading perpetrator of Alkhan-Yurt massacre
- Vladimir Stoychev (1892–1990), Bulgarian general in the Second World War
- Vladimir Sukhomlinov (1848–1926) Russian general of the Imperial Russian Army, Chief of the General Staff and Minister of War
- Vladimir Triandafillov (1894-1931), Soviet military commander and theoretician considered by many to be the "father of Soviet operational art"
- Vladimir Tributs (1900-1977), Soviet admiral
- Vladimir Vazov (1868–1945), Bulgarian general in the Balkan Wars and the First World War
- Vladimir Vol'skii (1877–1937), Russian revolutionary, one of the principal commanders of Russian Civil War
- Vladimir Zaimov (1888–1942), Bulgarian general and Soviet spy
- Vladimir Zhoga (1993–2022), Russian-Ukrainian separatist who commanded the Sparta Battalion, a pro-Russian separatist force

=== Intelligence officers ===
- Vladimir Dekanozov (1898–1953), Soviet senior state security operative and diplomat, deputy chief of GUGB
- Vladimir Kolokoltsev (born 1961), Russian politician and police officer, General of the police, Moscow Police Commissioner and Russian Minister of Internal Affairs
- Vladimir Kvachkov (born 1948), Russian former Spetsnaz colonel and military intelligence officer, known for being arrested and charged for the attempted assassination
- Vladimir Pozner Sr. (1908–1975), Russian-Jewish émigré to the United States who spied for Soviet intelligence while employed by the US government
- Vladimir Semichastny (1924–2001), Soviet politician, who served as chairman of the KGB

=== Cosmonauts ===
- Vladimir Aksyonov (1935–2024), former Soviet cosmonaut
- Vladimir Dezhurov (born 1962), Russian former cosmonaut
- Vladimir Dzhanibekov (born 1942), former cosmonaut
- Vladimir Komarov (1927–1967), Soviet test pilot, aerospace engineer, cosmonaut and the first person to die in a space flight
- Vladimir Kovalyonok (born 1942), Soviet retired cosmonaut
- Vladimir Lyakhov (1941–2018), Ukrainian Soviet cosmonaut
- Vladimír Remek (born 1948), Czech politician and diplomat and former cosmonaut and military pilot
- Vladimir Shatalov (1927–2021), Soviet cosmonaut
- Vladimir Solovyov (cosmonaut) (born 1946), former Soviet cosmonaut
- Vladimir Titov (cosmonaut) (born 1947), retired Russian Air Force colonel and former cosmonaut
- Vladimir Vasyutin (1952–2002), Soviet cosmonaut

=== Musicians ===
- Vladimir Ashkenazy (born 1937), pianist, chamber music performer and conductor
- Vladimir Djambazov (born 1954), Bulgarian composer and horn player
- Vladimir Feltsman (born 1952), Russian musician
- Vladimir Horowitz (1903–1989), Russian-American classical pianist and composer
- Vladimir Andreyevich Komarov (born 1976), Russian musician, singer, songwriter, sound producer, DJ, and journalist
- Vladimir Kranjčević (1936–2020), Croatian musician, conductor, pianist, and pedagogue
- Vladimir Oidupaa Oiun (1949–2013), a Tuvan throat singer who was wrongfully jailed by the Soviet Union for 33 of his 55 years. He is known for his album "Divine Music from a Jail" and for his impact on Turkic culture.
- Vladimir de Pachmann, Russian-German pianist
- Vladimir Presnyakov Jr. (born 1968), Soviet and Russian singer, musician, keyboardist, composer, arranger, and actor
- Vladimir Rosing (1890–1963), Russian-born American and English operatic tenor and stage director
- Vladimir Shainsky (1925–2017), Soviet and Russian composer
- Vladimír Válek (1935–2025), Czech conductor and educator
- Vladimir Vysotsky (1938–1980), Soviet singer-songwriter, poet, and actor

=== Actors and TV hosts ===
- Vladimir Brichta (born 1976), Brazilian actor
- Vladimir Duthiers (born 1969), American journalist and TV host at CBS
- Vladimir Fogel, Russian actor of the silent film era
- Vladimir Kozlov (born 1972), Ukrainian actor and professional wrestler
- Vladimir Mashkov (born 1963), Russian actor and film director
- Vladimir Solovyov (TV presenter) (born 1963), Russian journalist, television presenter, writer and propagandist
- Vladimir Yeryomin (actor), Soviet and Russian actor, screenwriter and producer
- Vladimir Karamazov (born 1979), Bulgarian actor, producer and photographer

=== Politicians ===
- Vladimir Andronachi (born 1980), Moldovan politician and economist
- Vladimir Chirskov (born 1935), Soviet politician
- Vladimir Dedijer, Yugoslav partisan fighter during World War II who became known as a politician, human rights activist, and historian, representative of Yugoslavia at the United Nations
- Vladimír Hučín (born 1952), Czech political celebrity and dissident of both communist and post-communist era
- Vladimir Kara-Murza (born 1981), Russian opposition politician, journalist, author, and filmmaker
- Vladimir Konstantinov (politician), Crimean and Russian politician, Chairman of the State Council of the Republic of Crimea, one of the principal commanders of the annexation of Crimea by the Russian Federation
- Vladimir Korolenko, Ukrainian-born Russian writer, journalist, human rights activist and humanitarian
- Vladimír Matejička (1956–2025), Slovak politician
- Vladimir Makei, Belarusian politician who has served as the minister of foreign affairs of Belarus since 2012
- Vladimir Medinsky (born 1970), Russian political figure, academic and publicist who served as the Minister of Culture of Russia
- Vladimir Milov (born 1972), Russian opposition, economist, associate of Alexei Navalny
- Vladimir D. Nabokov (1870–1922), Russian criminologist, journalist, and progressive statesman
- Vladimir Plahotniuc (born 1966), Moldovan politician, businessman and philanthropist, chairman of the Democratic Party of Moldova
- Vladimir Terebilov (1916–2004), Soviet judge and politician
- Vladimir Tsyganko (1886/1887–1938), Bessarabian and Soviet politician
- Vladimir Veselica, Croatian politician and economist
- Vladimir Vladimirov (politician), Russian politician, Governor of Stavropol Krai
- Vladimir Yakovlev (politician) (born 1944), Russian politician and former governor of Saint Petersburg
- Vladimir Yakushev (born 1968), Russian politician serving as the Presidential Plenipotentiary Representative in the Ural Federal District
- Vladimir Yelagin (born 1955), Russian politician

=== Writers ===
- Vladimir Cavarnali (1910–1966), Romanian poet and editor
- Vladimir Duthiers (born 1969), American journalist
- Vladimir Mayakovsky (1893–1930), Soviet poet, playwright, artist, and actor
- Vladimir Menshov (1939-2021), Soviet and Russian actor and filmmaker
- Vladimir Nabokov (1899–1977), Russian and American novelist, poet, translator and entomologist
- Vladimir Nazor (1876-1949), Croatian poet
- Vladimir Oravsky (born 1947), Slovak-born Swedish author and film director
- Vladimir Sorokin (born 1955), Russian writer and dramatist
- Vladimir Vidrić (1875-1909), Croatian poet

=== Scientists and engineers ===
- Vladimir Hachinski, Canadian clinical neuroscientist and researcher
- Vladimir Leontyevich Komarov (1869–1945), Russian botanist
- Vladimir Kostitsyn (born 1945), Russian geophysicist
- Vladimir Kovalevsky, Russian statesman, scientist and entrepreneur
- Vladimir Shkodrov (1930–2010), Bulgarian astronomer
- Vladimir Vernadsky (1863–1945), Russian mineralogist and geochemist
- Vladimir K. Zworykin, Russian-American inventor, engineer, and pioneer of television technology

=== Artists ===
- Vladimir Becić (1886–1954), Croatian painter and photographer
- Vladimir Dimitrov (1882–1960), Bulgarian painter, draughtsman and teacher
- Vladimír Havlík (born 1959), Czech action artist
- Vladimir Kush (born 1965), Russian-born American painter, jewelry designer, and sculptor
- Vladimir Makovsky (1846–1920), Russian painter, art collector, and teacher

=== Sportsmen ===
- Vladimir Arabadzhiev (born 1984), Bulgarian racing driver
- Vladimír Coufal (born 1992), Czech footballer
- Vladimir Dubov, Bulgarian freestyle wrestler
- Vladimir Gadzhev (born 1987), Bulgarian footballer
- Vladimir González (born 1978), Colombian road cyclist
- Vladimir Guerrero (born 1975), Dominican baseball player
- Vladimir Guerrero Jr. (born 1999), Canadian-Dominican baseball player
- Vladimir Iliev (born 1987), Bulgarian biathlete
- Vladimir Kniller (born 1964), Russian football coach and a former player
- Vladimir Kononenko (born 1971), former Russian football player
- Vladimir Konstantinov (born 1967), Russian-American ice hockey player
- Vladimir Kozlov (born 1979), Ukrainian-American producer and wrestler
- Vladimir Latocha (born 1973), a French breaststroke swimmer
- Vladimir Lutchenko, retired ice hockey player who played in the Soviet Hockey League
- Vladimir Makeev (born 1957), Soviet alpine skier
- Vladimir Moragrega (born 1998), Mexican footballer
- Vladimir Nikolov (volleyball) (born 1977), Bulgarian volleyball player
- Vladimir Nunez (born 1975), Cuban baseball pitcher
- Vladimir Obuchov (1935–2020), Soviet basketball coach
- Vladimir Orlando Cardoso de Araújo Filho (born 1989), Brazilian footballer
- Vladimir Parfyonov (born 1970), an Uzbekistani javelin thrower
- Vladimir Popov (weightlifter) (born 1977), Moldovan weightlifter
- Vladimir Portnoi (1931–1984), Soviet gymnast
- Vladimir Proskurin (1945–2020), Russian footballer
- Vladimir Salkov (1937–2020), Russian footballer
- Vladimir Sotnikov (born 2004), Russian Paralympic swimmer
- Vladimir Stojković, Serbian professional footballer
- Vladimir Tarasenko (born 1991), Russian ice hockey player
- Vladimir Timoshinin (born 1970), Russian diver
- Vladimir Vujović (footballer, born 1982) Montenegrin footballer
- Vladimir Zagorodniy (born 1983), Ukrainian road bicycle racer

=== Others ===
- Vladimir Derevenko, Russian Empire and Soviet medical doctor and surgeon who served at the court of Emperor Nicholas II of Russia
- Vladimír Hrinčár, co-developer of Beat Saber
- Vladimir Kramnik (born 1975), Russian chess grandmaster
- Vladimir McTavish (1955/1956–2026), Scottish comedian
- Vladimir Petkov (born 1971), Bulgarian chess grandmaster
- Vladimir Potanin (born 1961), Russian business oligarch
- Vladimir Socor (born 1945), Romanian-American political analyst of East European affairs for the Jamestown Foundation and its Eurasia Daily Monitor
- Vladimir Tenev (born 1987), Bulgarian-American entrepreneur and billionaire

== Fictional characters ==
- Vladimir (Waiting for Godot), also known as Vladimir "Albert" and "Didi", a character in Samuel Beckett's Waiting for Godot
- Vladimir, a character from My Life as a Teenage Robot
- Vladimir "Uncle Vlad" Glebov, character from GTA IV
- Vladimir Makarov, character from Call of Duty
- Vladimir DeMordrey, character from Sacred
- Baron Vladimir Harkonnen, character from Dune

== Words derived from Vladimir ==
- Vlad
- Vovochka, diminutive form of Vladimir, common character in Russian jokes
- Vladimirov
- Vladimirovka (disambiguation)
- Vladimirsky (disambiguation)
- Vladimirovsky
- Hvaldimir, a beluga whale found in Norway
