= Vladimirovka, Azerbaijan =

Vladimirovka, Azerbaijan may refer to:

- Vladimirovka, Oghuz
- Vladimirovka, Quba
- Vladimirovka, Sabirabad
