= Wladimir =

Wladimir is a masculine given name. It is an alternative spelling of the name Vladimir.

Notable people with the name include:

- Wladimir Aïtoff (1879–1963), French rugby player
- Wladimir Balentien (born 1984), Dutch outfielder for the Seattle Mariners
- Wladimir Belli (born 1970), Italian cyclist
- Wladimir Brunet de Presle (1809–1875), French historian
- Wladimir Burliuk (1886–1919), Ukrainian artist
- Wladimir d'Ormesson (1888–1973), French essayist and writer
- Wladimir Guedroitz (1873–1941), Russian chamberlain
- Wladimir Herrera (born 1981), Chilean football defender
- Wladimir Kaminer (born 1967), Russian writer
- Wladimir Klitschko (born 1976), Ukrainian boxer
- Wladimir Jan Kochanski (1935–2015), American pianist
- Wladimir Köppen, creator of the Köppen climate classification
- Wladimir von Pawlowski (1891–1961), Austrian lawyer
- Wladimir Resnitschenko (born 1965), Russian fencer
- Wladimir Ribeiro (born 1967), Brazilian swimmer
- Wladimir Rodrigues dos Santos (born 1954), a.k.a. Wladimir (footballer), Brazilian footballer
- Wladimir de Schoenefeld (1816–1875), German-French botanist
- Wladimir Seidel (1907–1981), Russian mathematician
- Wladimir Skulener (born 1958), Soviet-German chess player
- Wladimir A. Smirnoff (1917–2000), Soviet entomologist
- Wladimir Talanczuk, Ukrainian aeronautical engineer
- Wladimir Tchertkoff (fl. 2003–present), Italian journalist
- Wladimir Troubetzkoy (1942–2009), French literary historian
- Wladimir Vogel (1896–1984), Russian composer
- Wladimir Wertelecki (born 1936), Polish-American pediatrician
- Wladimir van Wilgenburg, Dutch journalist
- Wladimir Yordanoff (1954–2020), French actor
- Wladimir Zwalf (1932–2002), British Sanskritist and Buddhist expert

== See also ==
- Vladimir (name)
- Wladimiro
