= Krasny Pakhar =

Krasny Pakhar may refer to:

- Krasny Pakhar, Republic of Adygea, a village (khutor) in the Republic of Adygea, Russia
- Krasny Pakhar, Volgograd Oblast, a village (khutor) in Volgograd Oblast, Russia
- Krasny Pakhar, name of several other rural localities in Russia
