= Giaginsky =

Giaginsky (masculine), Giaginskaya (feminine), or Giaginskoye (neuter) may refer to:

- Giaginsky District, a district of the Republic of Adygea, Russia
- Giaginskaya, a rural locality (a stanitsa) in the Republic of Adygea, Russia
