= Włodzimierz =

Włodzimierz may refer to the following :

== People ==
- Włodzimierz (given name), a Polish variant of the (East) Slavic name Vladimir

== Places and jurisdictions ==
- Włodzimierz, Greater Poland Voivodeship (west-central Poland)
- Włodzimierz, Łask County in Łódź Voivodeship (central Poland)
- Włodzimierz, Radomsko County in Łódź Voivodeship (central Poland)
- Volodymyr-Volynskyi in Volyn Oblast (Western Ukraine) formerly known as Włodzimierz [Wołyński]
- Włodzimierz Voivodeship (1793)
- the former Roman Catholic Diocese of Włodzimierz (as Polish for Lodomeria alias Vladimir)

== See also ==
- Vladimir
- Volodymyr
- Uladzimir
