= Mikhelsonovsky =

Mikhelsonovsky Михельсоновский
- Khutor
- Location within Republic of Adygea Location within Russia
- Coordinates: 44°45′N 40°18′E
- Country: Russia
- Region: Adygea
- District: Giaginsky District
- Time zone: UTC+3:00

Mikhelsonovsky (Russian: Михельсоновский) is a rural locality (a khutor) in Sergiyevskoye Rural Settlement of Giaginsky District, Adygea, Russia. The population was 24 as of 2018.

== Geography ==
Mikhelsonovsky is located on the left bank of the Gachucha River, 41 km southeast of Giaginskaya (the district's administrative centre) by road. Dneprovsky is the nearest rural locality.

== Ethnicity ==
The khutor is inhabited by Russians.
