= Nechayevsky =

Nechayevsky (Russian: Нечаевский) may refer to:

- Nechayevsky, Republic of Adygea, a khutor (village) in the Republic of Adygea, Russia
- Nechayevsky, name of several other rural localities in Russia
