= Novy, Giaginsky District, Republic of Adygea =

Novy Новый ГъэпсыгъакI
- Village
- Location within Republic of Adygea Location within Russia
- Coordinates: 44°56′N 40°10′E
- Country: Russia
- Region: Adygea
- District: Giaginsky District
- Time zone: UTC+3:00

Novy (Russian: Новый; Adyghe: ГъэпсыгъакI) is a rural locality (a settlement) and the administrative center of Ayryumovskoye Rural Settlement of Giaginsky District, Adygea, Russia. The population was 1278 as of 2018. There are 19 streets.

== Geography ==
The village is located at the confluence of the Ayryum river in the Ulka river, 20 km southwest of Giaginskaya (the district's administrative centre) by road. Nizhny Ayryum is the nearest rural locality.
