= Kolkhozny =

Kolkhozny (masculine), Kolkhoznaya (feminine), or Kolkhoznoye (neuter) may refer to:

- Kolkhozny, Republic of Adygea, a village (khutor) in the Republic of Adygea, Russia
- Kolkhozny, Ulyanovsk Oblast, a settlement in Ulyanovsk Oblast, Russia
