= Volodymyr (disambiguation) =

Volodymyr is a Ukrainian masculine name.

Volodymyr may also refer to:

- Volodymyr, Ukraine, a city in Ukraine (1944–2021: Volodymyr-Volynskyi), historically spelt Volodimer', Volodimir, Vladimir, or Wlodzimierz, and sometimes with the addition in Volyn'/Volhynia to distinguish it from Vladimir, Russia (on the Klyazma / in Suzdalia)
- Volodymyrska Street, a street in Kyiv, Ukraine

== See also ==
- Uladzimir
- Vladimir (disambiguation)
