= Vlado =

Vlado (Cyrillic: Владо) is a Slavic masculine given name. Notable people with the given name include:

- Vlado Babić (born 1960), Serbian politician
- Vlado Badžim (born 1964), Slovenian football player and football coach
- Vlado Bagat (1915–1944), Croatian and Yugoslav soldier
- Vlado Bojović (born 1952), Yugoslav handball player
- Vlado Brinovec (1941–2006), Slovenian swimmer
- Vlado Bučkovski (born 1962), Macedonian politician
- Vlado Čapljić (born 1962), Bosnian football manager and former player
- Vlado Chernozemski (1897 –1934), Bulgarian revolutionary
- Vlado Dapčević (1917–2001), Montenegrin and Yugoslav communist and revolutionary
- Vlado Dijak (1925–1988), Yugoslav poet and songwriter
- Vlado Dimovski (born 1971), Slovenian economist, philosopher, politician, and university professor
- Vlado Fumić (born 1956), Yugoslav cyclist
- Vlado Georgiev (born 1976), Serbian recording artist
- Vlado Glođović (born 1976), Serbian football referee
- Vlado Goreski (born 1958), Macedonian scenographer, graphic artist and designer of theatre posters
- Vlado Gorišek (1925–1997), Slovenian civil engineer, constructor, and architect
- Vlado Gotovac (1930–2000), Croatian poet and politician
- Vlado Ilievski (born 1980), Macedonian basketball player
- Vlado Ivanov (born 1993), Bulgarian footballer
- Vlado Jagodić (born 1964), Bosnian Serb football manager and former player
- Vlado Janevski (born 1960), Macedonian singer
- Vlado Janković (born 1990), Greek-Serbian basketball player
- Vlado Jeknić (born 1983), Montenegrin footballer
- Vlado Jovanovski (born 1967), Macedonian actor
- Vlado Jug (born 1947), Slovenian ice hockey player
- Vlado Kalember (born 1953), Croatian pop singer
- Vlado Komšić (born 1955), Yugoslav footballer
- Vlado Košić (born 1959), Croatian Roman Catholic bishop
- Vlado Kotur (born 1958), Bosnian-Herzegovinian footballer and coach
- Vlado Kreslin (born 1953), Slovenian singer-songwriter and folk rock musician
- Vlado Kristl (1923–2004), Yugoslav filmmaker and artist
- Vlado Lemić (born 1966), Serbian former footballer and current football agent
- Vlado Lisjak (born 1962), Croatian Greco-Roman wrestler
- Vlado Maleski (1919–1984), Yugoslav Macedonian writer, communist activist, publisher and revolutionary
- Vlado Marković (born 1985), Bosnian-Herzegovinian footballer
- Vlado Martek (born 1951), Croatian artist
- Vlado Mažuranić (1915–1985), Yugoslav fencer
- Vlado Meller, Czechoslovak-born audio mastering engineer
- Vlado Miloševič (born 1968), Slovenian footballer
- Vlado Milošević (1901–1990), Serbian composer and ethnomusicologist
- Vlado Milunić (1941–2022), Czech architect
- Vlado Mirković (born 1975), Montenegrin footballer
- Vlado Mirosevic (born 1987), Chilean political scientist and politician
- Vlado Mrkic (born 1940), Bosnian-Herzegovinian writer and journalist
- Vlado Nedanovski (born 1985), Macedonian handball player
- Vlado Paradžik (born 1967), Bosnia and Herzegovina judoka
- Vlado Perlemuter (1904–2002), Lithuanian-born French pianist and teacher
- Vlado Petković (born 1983), Serbian volleyball player
- Vlado Poslek (born 1969), Croatian sprint canoer
- Vlado Pravdić (1949–2023), Bosnian musician
- Vlado Šćepanović (born 1975), Montenegrin basketball coach and former player
- Vlado Šegrt (1907–1991), Yugoslav politician
- Vlado Singer (1908–1943), Yugoslav politician
- Vlado Sirvoň (born 1951), Slovak volleyball player
- Vlado Šmit (born 1980), Serbian footballer
- Vlado Smokvina (1908–1982), Yugoslav swimmer
- Vlado Šola (born 1968), Croatian handball player
- Vlado Stenzel (born 1934), Croatian team handball player
- Vlado Strugar (1922–2019), Serbian historian
- Vlado Taneski (1952–2008), Macedonian crime reporter and serial killer
- Vlado Tomovic (1996), Serbian-Canadian politician
- Vlado Tortevski (born 1959), Macedonian football manager and former player
- Vlado Vukoje (born 1952), Croatian handball player and handball coach
- Vlado Zadro (born 1987), Bosnian-Herzegovinian football player
- Vlado Zlojutro (born 1988), Swedish footballer

== See also ==
- Vladimir (name)
- Vladislav
