= Volno-Vesyoly =

Volno-Vesyoly Вольно-Весёлый Шъхьафит-ЧэфыпI
- Khutor
- Location within Republic of Adygea Location within Russia
- Coordinates: 44°54′N 40°15′E
- Country: Russia
- Region: Adygea
- District: Giaginsky District
- Time zone: UTC+3:00

Volno-Vesyoly (Russian: Вольно-Весёлый; Adyghe: Шъхьафит-ЧэфыпI) is a rural locality (a khutor) in Dondukovskoye Rural Settlement of Giaginsky District, Adygea, Russia. The population was 72 as of 2018. There are 4 streets.

== Geography ==
The khutor is located on the Gryaznukha River, 22 km east of Giaginskaya (the district's administrative centre) by road. Semyono-Makarensky is the nearest rural locality.
