= Cheryomushkin =

Cheryomushkin Черёмушкин
- Khutor
- Location within Republic of Adygea Location within Russia
- Coordinates: 44°47′N 40°03′E
- Country: Russia
- Region: Adygea
- District: Giaginsky District
- Time zone: UTC+3:00

Cheryomushkin (Russian: Черёмушкин) is a rural locality (a khutor) in Giaginskoye Rural Settlement of Giaginsky District, Adygea, Russia. The population of this village was 93 as of 2018. There is 1 street.

== Geography ==
Cheryomushkin is located 19 km south of Giaginskaya (the district's administrative centre) by road. Kelermesskaya is the nearest rural locality.
