= Georgiyevskoye, Republic of Adygea =

Georgiyevskoye Георгиевское Георгиевскэр
- Village
- Location within Republic of Adygea Location within Russia
- Coordinates: 44°45′N 40°24′E
- Country: Russia
- Region: Adygea
- District: Giaginsky District
- Time zone: UTC+3:00

Georgiyevskoye (Russian: Георгиевское; Adyghe: Георгиевскэр) is a rural locality (a selo) in Sergiyevskoye Rural Settlement of Giaginsky District, Adygea, Russia. The population was 238 as of 2018. There are 5 streets.

== Geography ==
Georgiyevskoye is located 42 km southeast of Giaginskaya (the district's administrative centre) by road. Tambovsky is the nearest rural locality.

== Ethnicity ==
The village is inhabited by Russians, Armenians and Chuvashes.
