= Krasny Khleborob =

Krasny Khleborob Красный Хлебороб Хьалыгъулэжь Плъыжь
- Khutor
- Location within Republic of Adygea Location within Russia
- Coordinates: 44°53′N 40°13′E
- Country: Russia
- Region: Adygea
- District: Giaginsky District
- Time zone: UTC+3:00

Krasny Khleborob (Russian: Красный Хлебороб; Adyghe: Хьалыгъулэжь Плъыжь) is a rural locality (a khutor) in Ayryumovskoye Rural Settlement of Giaginsky District, Adygea, Russia. The population was 43 as of 2018. There are 2 streets.

== Geography ==
Krasny Khleborob is located 17 km east of Giaginskaya (the district's administrative centre) by road. Progress is the nearest rural locality.
