= Tambovsky =

Tambovsky (masculine), Tambovskaya (feminine), or Tambovskoye (neuter) may refer to:

- Tambovsky District, name of several districts in Russia
- Tambovsky (rural locality) (Tambovskaya, Tambovskoye), name of several rural localities in Russia
- Tambov Oblast (Tambovskaya oblast), a federal subject of Russia
