= Smolchev-Malinovsky =

Smolchev-Malinovsky Смольчев-Малиновский
- Khutor
- Location within Republic of Adygea Location within Russia
- Coordinates: 44°51′N 40°25′E
- Country: Russia
- Region: Adygea
- District: Giaginsky District
- Time zone: UTC+3:00

Smolchev-Malinovsky (Russian: Смольчев-Малиновский) is a rural locality (a khutor) in Dondukovskoye Rural Settlement of Giaginsky District, Adygea, Russia. The population of this village was 94 as of 2018. There are 10 streets.

== Geography ==
Smolchev-Malinovsky is located 33 km east of Giaginskaya (the district's administrative centre) by road. Ignatyevsky is the nearest rural locality.
