= Goncharka =

Goncharka Гончарка Гончаркэр
- Village
- Location within Republic of Adygea Location within Russia
- Coordinates: 44°48′N 39°57′E
- Country: Russia
- Region: Adygea
- District: Giaginsky District
- Time zone: UTC+3:00

Goncharka (Russian: Гончарка; Adyghe: Гончаркэр) is a rural locality (a settlement) in Giaginskoye Rural Settlement of Giaginsky District, Adygea, Russia. The population was 1,472 as of 2018. There are 21 streets.

== Geography ==
Goncharka is located 16 km southwest of Giaginskaya (the district's administrative centre) by road. Podgorny is the nearest rural locality.
