= Dneprovsky =

Dneprovsky Днепровский Днепровскэр
- Khutor
- Location within Republic of Adygea Location within Russia
- Coordinates: 44°45′N 40°18′E
- Country: Russia
- Region: Adygea
- District: Giaginsky District
- Time zone: UTC+3:00

Dneprovsky (Russian: Днепровский; Adyghe: Днепровскэр) is a rural locality (a khutor) in Sergiyevskoye Rural Settlement of Giaginsky District, Adygea, Russia. The population was 175 as of 2018. There are 3 streets.

== Geography ==
The khutor is located on the right bank of the Gachucha River, 40 km southeast of Giaginskaya (the district's administrative centre) by road. Kolkhozny is the nearest rural locality.

== Ethnicity ==
The khutor is inhabited by Russians.
