= Veljko Todorovski =

Macedonian footballer

Personal information
- Full name: Veljko Todorovski
- Date of birth: 1951 (age 74–75)
- Place of birth: Pečkovo, SFR Yugoslavia
- Position: Midfielder

Senior career*
Years	Team	Apps	(Gls)
1969–1974	Mačva Šabac		
1974–1978	Bor	63	(10)
1978–1979	Galenika Zemun	4	(0)
- * Club domestic league appearances and goals

Veljko Todorovski (Macedonian: Вељко Тодоровски, born in 1951) is a retired Macedonian football midfielder.

== Club career ==
Born in Pečkovo, SR Macedonia, he played with Mačva Šabac, Bor and Galenika Zemun. He played mostly in the Yugoslav Second League except one season with Bor in the Yugoslav First League.
