= Lesnoy, Giaginsky District, Republic of Adygea =

Lesnoy Лесной Мэзылъ
- Village
- Location within Republic of Adygea Location within Russia
- Coordinates: 44°47′N 40°11′E
- Country: Russia
- Region: Adygea
- District: Giaginsky District
- Time zone: UTC+3:00

Lesnoy (Russian: Лесной; Adyghe: Мэзылъ) is a rural locality (a selo) in Kelermesskoye Rural Settlement of Giaginsky District, Adygea, Russia. The population was 171 as of 2018. There are 4 streets.

== Geography ==
Lesnoy is located 17 km southeast of Giaginskaya (the district's administrative centre) by road. Kelermesskaya is the nearest rural locality.
