= Obraztsovy =

Obraztsovy (masculine), Obraztsovaya (feminine), or Obraztsovoye (neuter) may refer to:

- Obraztsovy, Krasnodar Krai, a settlement in Krasnodar Krai, Russia
- Obraztsovoye, a village (selo) in the Republic of Adygea, Russia
