= Vladimiroff =

Vladimiroff (Russian: Владимиров) is a Russian surname. Notable people with the surname include:

- Christine Vladimiroff (1940–2014), American Benedictine nun
- Pierre Vladimiroff (1893–1970), Russian ballet dancer and teacher

== See also ==
- von Vladimiroff
- Vladimirov
