= Farsovsky =

Farsovsky Фарсовский Фарз
- Khutor
- Location within Republic of Adygea Location within Russia
- Coordinates: 44°44′N 40°22′E
- Country: Russia
- Region: Adygea
- District: Giaginsky District
- Time zone: UTC+3:00

Farsovsky (Russian: Фарсовский; Adyghe: Фарз) is a rural locality (a khutor) in Sergiyevskoye Rural Settlement of Giaginsky District, Adygea, Russia. The population of this village was 11 as of 2018.

== Geography ==
The khutor is located on the right bank of the Fars River, 42 km southeast of Giaginskaya (the district's administrative centre) by road. Tambovsky is the nearest rural locality.

== Ethnicity ==
The khutor is inhabited by Russians.
