= Violi =

Violi (Italian: [ˈvjɔːli; viˈɔːli]) is an Italian surname. Notable people with the surname include:

- Angela Violi, Italian combustion engineer
- Paolo Violi (1931–1978), Italian-Canadian mobster
- Violi brothers, sons of Paolo Violi of the Luppino-Violi crime family
- Paolo Vietti-Violi (1882–1965), Italian architect
- Paul Violi (1944–2011), American poet
- Marcello Violi, Italian rugby player
- Dario Violi (1906–1967), Italian politician
