= Sergiyevskoye, Republic of Adygea =

Sergiyevskoye Сергиевское Сергиевскэр
- Village
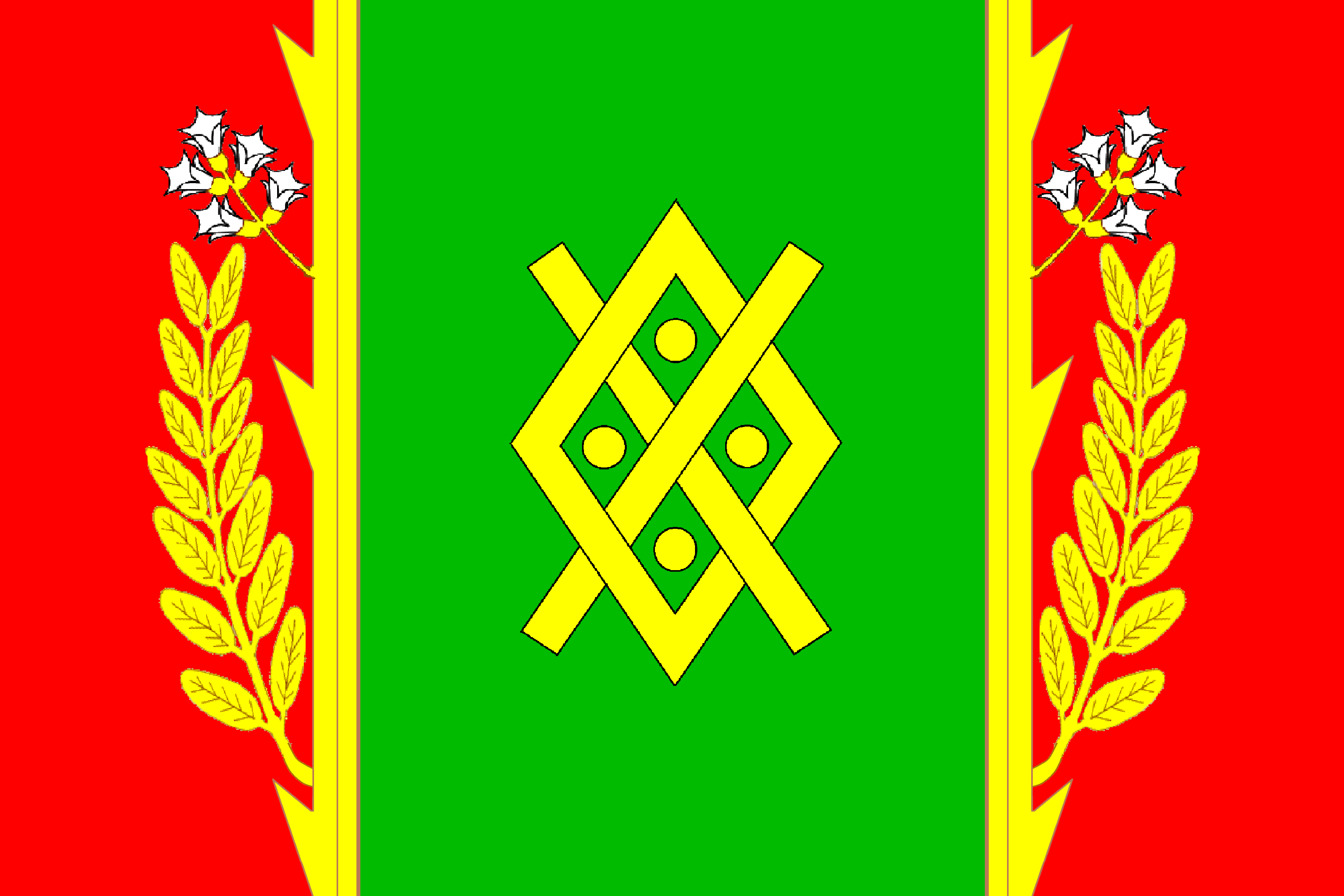
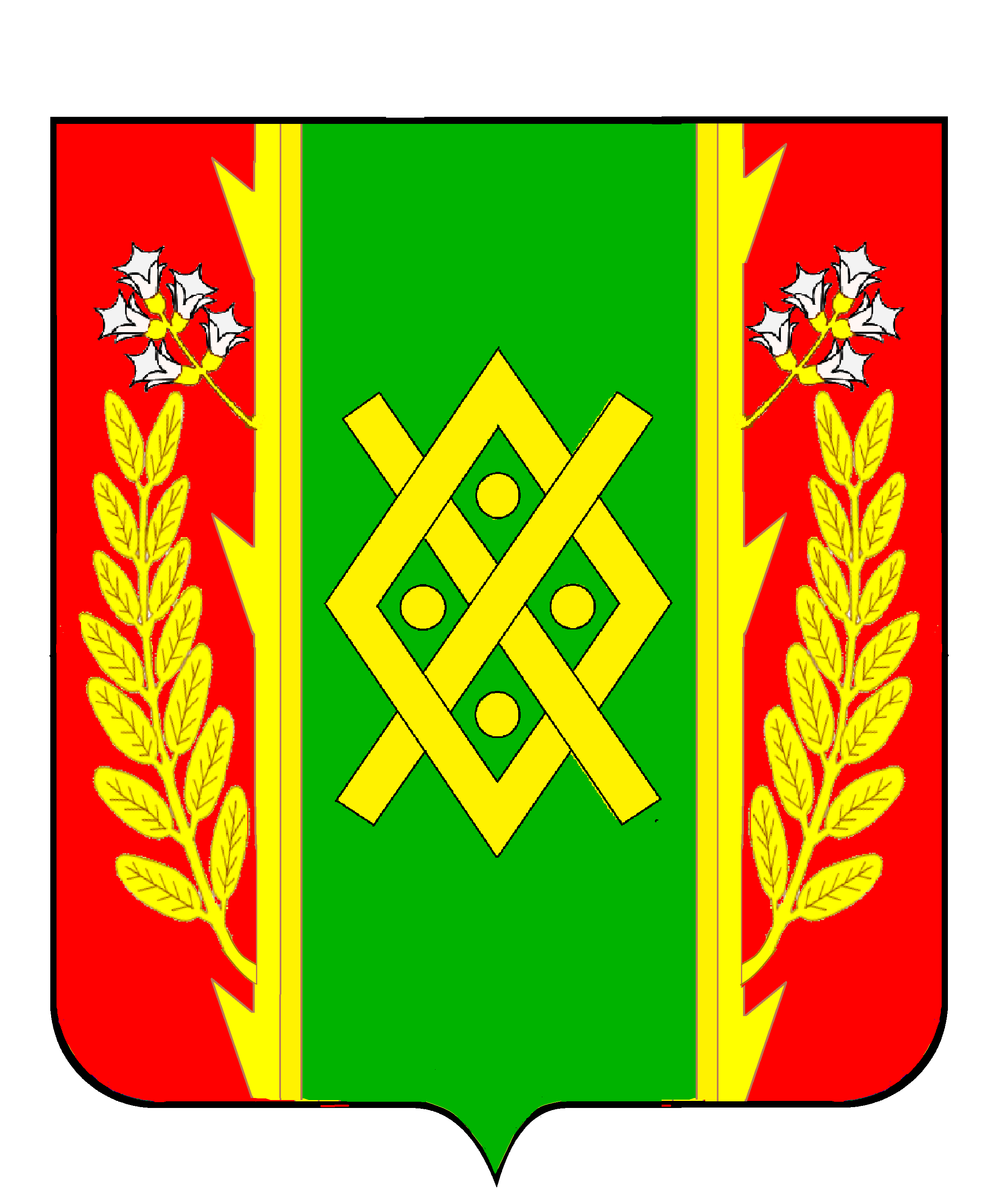
- Flag Seal

- Location within Republic of Adygea Location within Russia
- Coordinates: 44°48′N 40°20′E
- Country: Russia
- Region: Adygea
- District: Giaginsky District
- Time zone: UTC+3:00

Sergiyevskoye (Russian: Сергиевское; Adyghe: Сергиевскэр) is a rural locality (a selo) in Sergiyevskoye Rural Settlement of Giaginsky District, Adygea, Russia. The population of this village was 1,358 as of 2018. There are 28 streets.

== Geography ==
Sergiyevskoye is located 33 km southeast of Giaginskaya (the district's administrative centre) by road. Shishkinsky is the nearest rural locality.

== Ethnicity ==
The village is inhabited by Russians.
