= Wladimiro =

Wladimiro may refer to:

- Wladimiro Calarese (1930–2005), an Italian fencer
- Wladimiro "Tony" De Tomaso (born 1951), an Italian racing driver
- Wladimiro Falcone (born 1995), Italian footballer
- Wladimiro Ganzarolli (1932–2010), an Italian operatic bass-baritone
- Wladimiro Guadagno (born 1965), an Italian actress, television personality
- Wladimiro Panizza (1945–2002), an Italian professional road bicycle racer

== See also ==
- Vladimiro
