= Alexander Graham Christie =

Canadian-American mechanical engineer and educator (1880-1964)

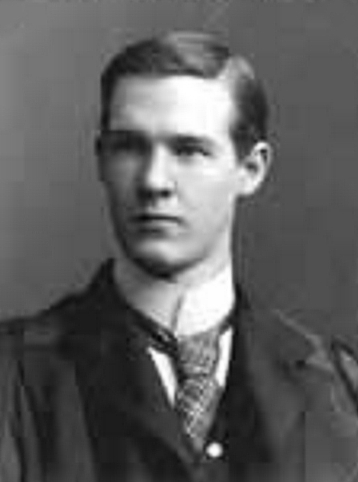
Alexander Graham Christie, 1901

Alexander Graham Christie (November 19, 1880 – October 24, 1964) was a Canadian/American mechanical engineer and Professor at the Johns Hopkins University, who served as president of the American Society of Mechanical Engineers in 1939–40.

== Biography ==
=== Youth, education and early career ===
Christie was born in Manchester, Ontario, Canada to Peter Christie and Mary Honor (Graham) Christie. He obtained his MSc in mechanical engineering at the School of Practical Science at the University of Toronto in 1901.

After his graduation Christie started as an apprentice in the engineering shop of the Westinghouse Machine Company. After the introduction of its first steam turbine, Christie specialized in that field.

=== Further career in education and recognition ===
By 1909 he was research Assistant in Steam and Gas Engineering at the University of Wisconsin, and associate professor of Steam and Gas Engineering by 1914. In 1914 he moved to the Johns Hopkins University, where he became associate professor, and later Professor of Engineering until his retirement in 1948, and director of the McCoy College until 1953.

In 1939-40 Christie served as president of the American Society of Mechanical Engineers. He was awarded the honorary doctor in engineering by the Stevens Institute of Technology in 1939, and by the Lehigh University in 1940. The American Society for Engineering Education awarded Christie the Lamme Gold Medal in 1948, and the first George Westinghouse Gold Medal for engineering by the ASME in 1953. At the Johns Hopkins Whiting school of Engineer an annual lecture is held on his behalf, the Alexander Graham Christie Lecture.

== Selected publications ==
- Alexander Graham Christie, Otto Louis Kowalke. Steam and gas engineering laboratory notes, 1912.
- Alexander Graham Christie, What does an engineer do? New York, Wantage Press, 1963.
