= Vladimer =

Vladimer is a masculine given name, the Georgian spelling of Vladimir. The name is borne by:

- Vladimer Aptsiauri (1962–2012), Soviet fencer from Georgia
- Vladimer Barkaia (1937–2022), Soviet footballer from Georgia
- Vladimer Chanturia (born 1978), Georgian boxer
- Vladimer Chachibaia (born 1971), Georgian lieutenant general and politician, former Chief of Georgian Defense Forces, Chief of the Joint Staff and Chief of the General Staff of the Georgian Armed Forces
- Vladimer Gegeshidze (born 1985), Georgian Greco-Roman wrestler
- Vladimer Gaprindashvili (born 1946), Georgian engineer
- Lado Gurgenidze (born 1970), Georgian banker, business executive, and former politician, sixth prime minister of Georgia
- Vladimer Khinchegashvili (born 1991), Georgian freestyle wrestler, Olympic and European champion
- Vladimer Mamuchashvili (born 1997), Georgian footballer
- Vladimer Papava (born 1955), Georgian professor of economics, Academician-Secretary of the Georgian National Academy of Sciences and former Minister of Economy of Georgia
- Vladimer Tchintcharauli (born 1981), Georgian Paralympic shooter
- Vladimer Ugrekhelidze (1939–2009), Soviet-Georgian basketball player
