= Vladimirsky =

Vladimirsky (masculine), Vladimirskaya (feminine), Vladimirskoye (neuter) or variant spellings may refer to:

== Buildings ==
- Vladimir Palace (Vladimirsky dvorets), an imperial palace in Saint Petersburg, Russia
- Vladimirskaya (Saint Petersburg Metro), a station of the Saint Petersburg Metro
- Vladimirskaya Church, a Russian Orthodox Church on Vladimirski Prospekt, Saint Petersburg, Russia

== Places ==
- Vladimirsky District, name of several districts in Russia
- Vladimirsky Municipal Okrug, a municipal okrug of Tsentralny District of St. Petersburg, Russia
- Vladimirsky (rural locality) (Vladimirskaya, Vladimirskoye), name of several rural localities in Russia
- Vladimirsky Lager, a rural locality in Pskov Oblast, Russia
- Vladimir Oblast (Vladimirskaya oblast), a federal subject of Russia
- Vladimirskaya Square, a square in Saint Petersburg
- Vladimirski Prospekt, the street in St Petersburg, Russia, on which the Lensovet Theatre is located

== People ==
- Boris Mikhajlovich Vladimirskij, astronomer, after whom the planet 3591 Vladimirskij was named
- Boris Vladimirski (1878–1950), Soviet painter
- Lev Vladimirsky (1903–1973), Soviet naval officer
- Mikhail Vladimirsky (1874–1951), Soviet politician
- Tomo Vladimirski (1896–?), Macedonian painter

== Other uses ==
- Vladimirskaya, more commonly known as Theotokos of Vladimir, a famous Russian icon in Moscow
- 3591 Vladimirskij, a minor planet
- Admiral Vladimirsky, a Russian Akademik Krylov-class ship

== See also ==
- Vladimir (disambiguation)
- Vladimirov, a Russian and Bulgarian surname
- Vladimirovka (disambiguation)
- Vladimirskiy rozhok, a musical instrument
- Lev Vlodzimirsky, Soviet official
