= Progress, Republic of Adygea =

Progress Прогресс
- Khutor
- Location within Republic of Adygea Location within Russia
- Coordinates: 44°52′N 40°11′E
- Country: Russia
- Region: Adygea
- District: Giaginsky District
- Time zone: UTC+3:00

Progress (Russian: Прогресс) is a rural locality (a khutor) in Ayryumovskoye Rural Settlement of Giaginsky District, Adygea, Russia. The population was 911 as of 2018. There are 10 streets.

== Geography ==
Progress is located 14 km east of Giaginskaya (the district's administrative centre) by road. Obraztsovoye is the nearest rural locality.
