= Nechayevsky, Republic of Adygea =

Nechayevsky Нечаевский Нечаевскэр
- Khutor
- Location within Republic of Adygea Location within Russia
- Coordinates: 44°53′N 40°24′E
- Country: Russia
- Region: Adygea
- District: Giaginsky District
- Time zone: UTC+3:00

Nechayevsky (Russian: Нечаевский; Adyghe: Нечаевскэр) is a rural locality (a khutor) in Dondukovskoye Rural Settlement of Giaginsky District, Adygea, Russia. The population was 25 as of 2018. There are 2 streets.

== Geography ==
Nechayevsky is located 31 km east of Giaginskaya (the district's administrative centre) by road. Smolchev-Malinovsky is the nearest rural locality.
