= Włodzimierz (given name) =

- Pronunciation: [vwɔˈd͡ʑimʲɛʂ]
- Gender: male
- Language: Polish

Origin
- Origin: Slavic
- Meaning: włod (to rule, ruler) + -mir (peace/world) / wald (power, brightness) + mar (fame)
- Region of origin: Poland

Other names
- Alternative spelling: Vladimir
- Nickname: Włodek
- Related names: Władysław, Włodzisław, Waldemar, Mirosław

Włodzimierz is a Polish variant of the Slavic name Vladimir. The name may refer to:

- Włodzimierz Błasiak, Polish engineer
- Włodzimierz Cimoszewicz (born 1950), Polish politician
- Włodzimierz Czarniak (1934–1964), Polish alpine skier
- Włodzimierz Kuperberg (born 1941), Polish mathematics research in geometry and topology
- Włodzimierz Dzieduszycki (1825–1899), Polish noble (szlachcic), landowner, naturalist, political activist, collector and patron of arts
- Włodzimierz Kotoński (1925–2014), Polish composer
- Włodzimierz Krzyżanowski (1824–1887), Polish military leader and a brigade commander in the Union Army during the American Civil War
- Wlodzimierz Ksiazek (1951–2011), contemporary New England painter
- Włodzimierz Lubański (born 1947), Polish football player
- Włodzimierz Perzyński (1877–1930), Polish writer and dramatist
- Włodzimierz Schmidt (1943–2023), Polish chess grandmaster
- Włodzimierz Smolarek (1957–2012), retired Polish football player
- Włodzimierz Sokorski (1908–1999), Polish communist activist, writer, military journalist and eventually a Brigadier General
- Włodzimierz Tetmajer (1861–1923), Polish painter
- Włodzimierz Zawadzki (born 1967), Polish wrestler

== See also ==
- Vladimir
- Włodzimierz (disambiguation)
