= Margaret Wooldridge =

American combustion engineer

Margaret Stacey Wooldridge is an American engineer known for her research on combustion of fuel-air mixtures and its byproducts, including the operation of gas turbines and diesel engines. She is Arthur F. Thurnau Professor of Mechanical Engineering and Walter J. Weber, Jr. Professor of Sustainable Energy, Environmental and Earth Systems Engineering at the University of Michigan, where she directs the Wooldridge Combustion Laboratory.

== Education and career ==
Wooldridge majored in mechanical engineering at the University of Illinois Urbana-Champaign, graduating in 1989. She went to Stanford University for graduate study in mechanical engineering, earning a master's degree in 1991 and completing her Ph.D. in 1995.

She became an assistant professor of mechanical engineering at Texas A&M University in 1995, and moved to the University of Michigan in 1998. She was tenured as an associate professor in 2002, and promoted to full professor in 2007.

== Recognition ==
The University of Michigan named Wooldridge as an Arthur F. Thurnau Professor of Mechanical Engineering in 2009, and as Walter J. Weber, Jr. Professor of Sustainable Energy, Environmental and Earth Systems Engineering in 2022.

Wooldridge was elected as an Fellow of the American Society of Mechanical Engineers (ASME) in 2008, and as a Fellow of the Society of Automotive Engineers in the fellows class of 2013, "for her outstanding work on fuel ignition chemistry and optical diagnostics and visualization relating to advanced combustion in engines, with application to homogeneous charge compression ignition engines and for her contributions to automotive engineering education". In 2019 she became a Fellow of The Combustion Institute.

She was the 2011 winner of the ASME George Westinghouse Silver Medal, and a 2013 winner of the Ernest Orlando Lawrence Award of the United States Department of Energy, "for the development and application of novel experimental methods that elucidate critical chemical and physical interactions during ignition, and for advancing understanding in combustion chemistry science impacting engine performance".
