= Kelermesskaya =

Kelermesskaya Келермесская Къэлэрмэз
- Stanitsa
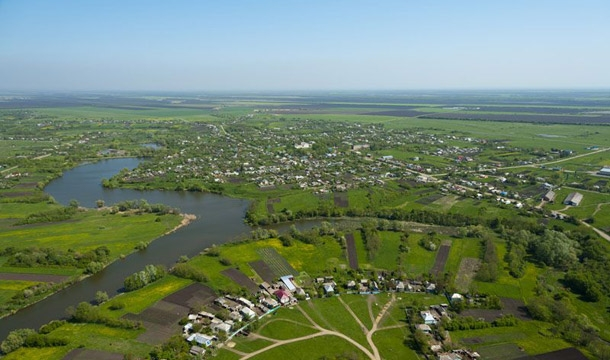

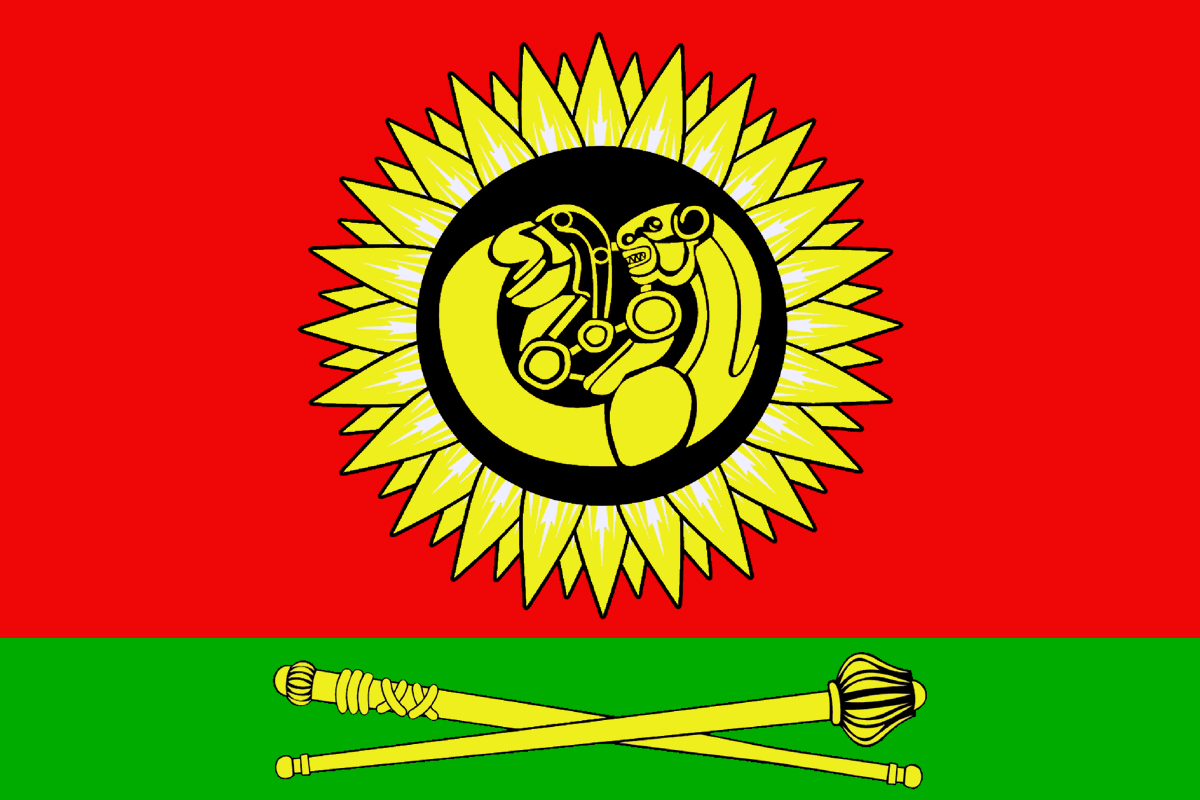
- Flag

- Location within Republic of Adygea Location within Russia
- Coordinates: 44°47′N 40°07′E
- Country: Russia
- Region: Adygea
- District: Giaginsky District
- Time zone: UTC+3:00

Kelermesskaya (Russian: Келермесская; Adyghe: Къэлэрмэз) is a rural locality (a stanitsa) and the administrative center of Kelermesskoye Rural Settlement of Giaginsky District, Adygea, Russia. The population was 2844 as of 2018. There are 26 streets.

It was the site of executions and burials during the Civil War.

== Geography ==
The stanitsa is located in the steppe zone, 12 km southeast of Giaginskaya (the district's administrative centre) by road. Lesnoy is the nearest rural locality.
