= Ken Coar =

American software programmer (born 1960)

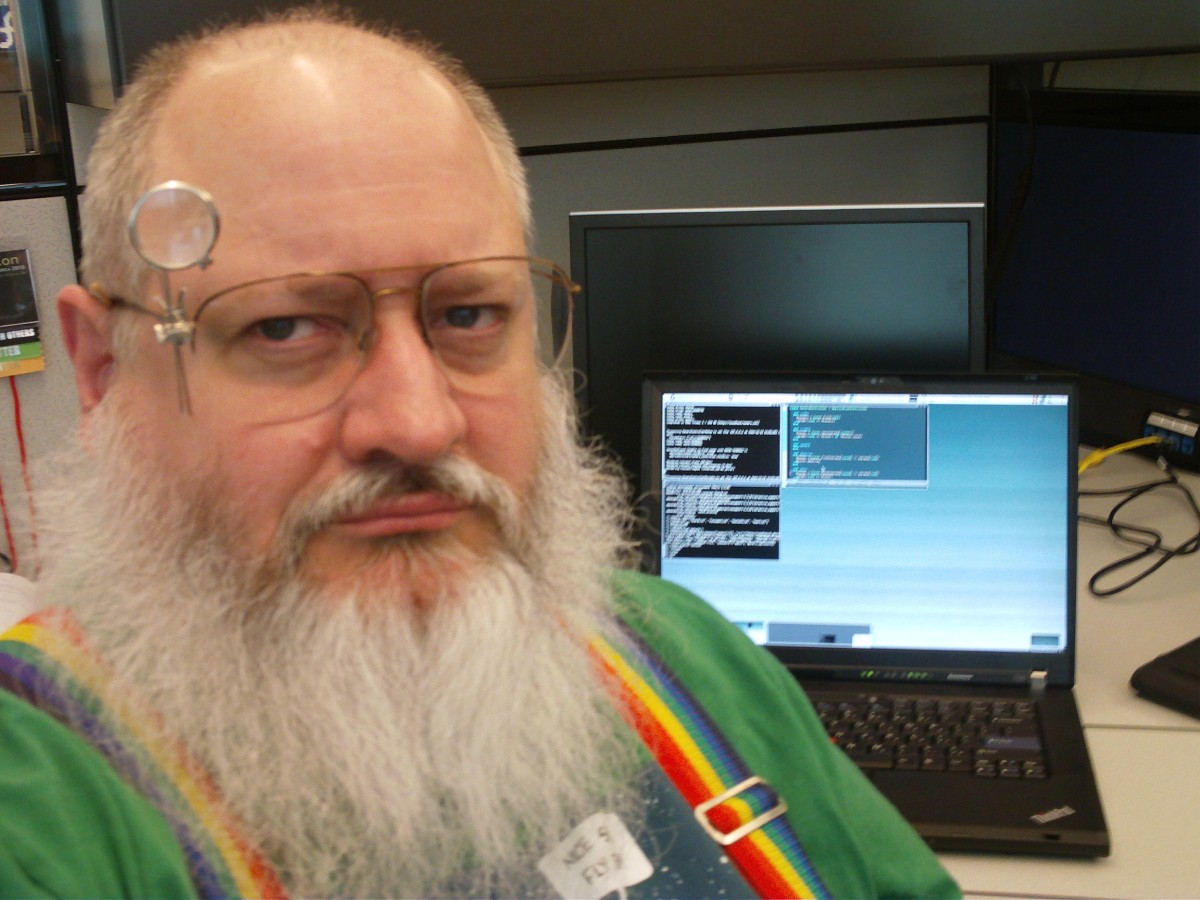
- Born: 1960 (age 65–66)
- Education: University of Massachusetts Amherst
- Years active: 1997–present
- Board member of: Apache Software Foundation Director, 1998–2007; Open Source Initiative Director, 2004–2010
- Father: Richard Coar

Ken Coar (born 1960) is an American software developer known for his participation in the creation of The Apache Software Foundation.

== Open source ==
Coar has been active in open software projects, and lectures internationally about open development methodologies and distributed collaboration. He is co-author with David R. Robinson of RFC 3875, the Common Gateway Interface (CGI) specification.

== Apache Software Foundation ==
Coar is a founder of The Apache Software Foundation (ASF) and was a director on its board from its incorporation in 1999 through June 2007. He is also the primary contributor to the Apache Pulse project, which provides daily analyses of all of the Apache mailing lists. Coar was responsible for the ApacheCon shows, held in North America and Europe since 2000. He was the initial chair of the Apache Commons project and helped in the creation of the Apache Incubator project.

== Publications ==
Coar is the author of the books Apache Server for Dummies, Apache Server Unleashed, and Apache Cookbook, and has written articles for a number of publications, including Linux Magazine, ACM Queue, Linux Today, PHPBuilder, EnterpriseIT Planet, and Apache Today.

== See also ==
- Apache Software Foundation
- Open Source Initiative
- PHP
