= Vlado Tortevski =

Association footballer (born 1959)

Personal information
- Full name: Vlado Tortevski
- Date of birth: 21 June 1959 (age 67)
- Place of birth: Pečkovo, SFR Yugoslavia
- Position: Midfielder

Senior career*
Years	Team	Apps	(Gls)
1978–1979	Tikvesh	13	(0)
1979–1982	Vardar	22	(0)
1982–1983	Timok	16	(1)
1983–1984	Teteks	24	(0)
1988	St George FC	23	(1)
1989	Footscray JUST	5	(0)
1989	Altona Magic		

Managerial career
- 2002: Preston Lions
- 2004: Altona Magic
- 2006–2009: Altona Magic
- * Club domestic league appearances and goals

Vlado Tortevski (Macedonian: Владо Тортевски; born 21 June 1959) is a Macedonian football manager and former player.

== Club career ==
Born in Pečkovo, SR Macedonia, he played as a midfielder with number of Yugoslav clubs namely Tikvesh, Vardar, Timok and Teteks, mostly in the Yugoslav Second League, also playing with Vardar in the Yugoslav First League.

In 1988, he moved to Australia, where he played one season with St George FC, and in 1989, he moved to Footscray JUST. Midway through the 1989 season, he joined Altona Magic. He later became a manager, and has coached Preston Lions and Altona Magic during the 2000s.
