= Dondukovskaya =

Dondukovskaya Дондуковская Дондуковскэр
- Stanitsa
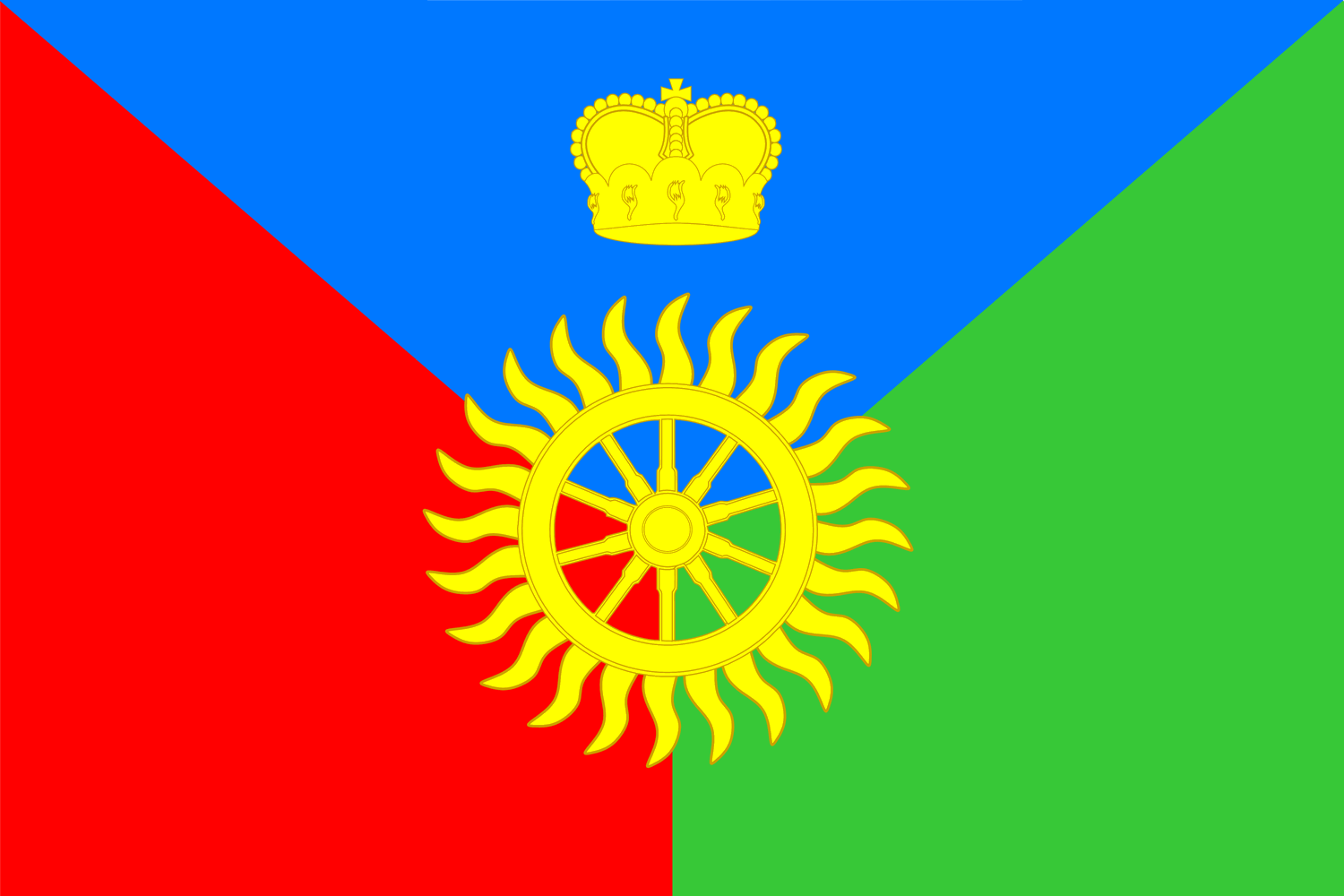
- Flag

- Location within Republic of Adygea Location within Russia
- Coordinates: 44°52′N 40°21′E
- Country: Russia
- Region: Adygea
- District: Giaginsky District
- Time zone: UTC+3:00

Dondukovskaya (Russian: Дондуковская; Adyghe: Дондуковскэр) is a rural locality (a stanitsa) and the administrative center of Dondukovskoye Rural Settlement of Giaginsky District, Adygea, Russia. The population was 6636 as of 2018. There are 56 streets.

== Geography ==
The stanitsa is located in the steppe zone on the Fars River, 26 km east of Giaginskaya (the district's administrative centre) by road. Krasny Fars is the nearest rural locality.

== Ethnicity ==
The stanitsa is inhabited by Russians, Armenians, Ukrainians and Adygheans.
