= Krasny Pakhar, Republic of Adygea =

Krasny Pakhar Красный Пахарь Жъонэкӏо Плъыжь
- Khutor
- Location within Republic of Adygea Location within Russia
- Coordinates: 44°44′N 40°17′E
- Country: Russia
- Region: Adygea
- District: Giaginsky District
- Time zone: UTC+3:00

Krasny Pakhar (Russian: Красный Пахарь; Adyghe: Жъонэкӏо Плъыжь) is a rural locality (a khutor) in Sergiyevskoye Rural Settlement of Giaginsky District, Adygea, Russia. The population was 30 as of 2018. There are 2 streets.

== Geography ==
The khutor is located on the left bank of the Gachucha River, 42 km southeast of Giaginskaya (the district's administrative centre) by road. Dneprovsky is the nearest rural locality.

== Ethnicity ==
The khutor is inhabited by Russians.
