= Richard Coar =

American aerospace engineer (1921–2013)

- Born: Richard John Coar; May 2, 1921; Hanover, New Hampshire, U.S.
- Died: December 29, 2013 (aged 92); Roanoke, Virginia, U.S.
- Education: Tufts University (BS)
- Occupation: Engineer
- Years active: 1941–1986
- Employer(s): Pratt & Whitney; United Technologies
- Known for: J58 turbojet for the SR-71 "Blackbird"; RL10 rocket engine
- Children: Kenneth
- Awards: George Westinghouse Medal; Daniel Guggenheim Medal

Richard John Coar (May 2, 1921 – December 29, 2013), an American aeronautical engineer and former president of Pratt & Whitney.

== Early life ==
Coar was born on May 2, 1921 in Hanover, New Hampshire. He spend his childhood in Hanover and Kingston, Massachusetts.

He received a four-year scholarship from Tufts College, graduating with a bachelor's degree in mechanical engineering summa cum laude in 1942. While at Tufts, he joined Tau Beta Pi in 1942.

== Career ==
The summer before his senior year in college, Coar worked as a summer internata the Pratt & Whitney's engineering department. After college, he became a test engineer for the company, working with the engines used in United States military aircraft during World War II. He helped develop the model 304 liquid hydrogen aircraft engine and the RL10 rocket engine.

After the war, he continued to work for Pratt & Whitney, and later with its parent company, United Technologies Corporation. He became the chief engineer of its Florida Research and Development Center in West Palm Beach in 1956. Coar returned to Connecticut in 1971 as Pratt & Whitney's vice president, overseeing commercial and military engine development. He was promoted to executive vice president in 1976 and became the company's president in 1983. In 1984, he became the executive vice president of United Technologies, retiring in 1986.

Coar was a member of the National Research Council's Aeronautics and Space Engineering Board. He was a member of the United States National Academy of Engineering, the American Society of Mechanical Engineers, and the American Society for Metals.

== Honors and award ==
The American Society of Mechanical Engineers honored him with the George Westinghouse Medal in 1984. He received the Franklin W. Kolk Air Transportation Award from the Society of Automotive Engineers in 1985. In 1998, he received the Daniel Guggenheim Medal for achievements in aeronautics.

== Personal life ==
Coar was married to Cecile Berle who died in 1971. He then married Lucille Hicks. His son, Ken Coar, is well known for his involvement in the launch of the Apache Foundation, a United States–based non-profit software development company. His other children are Candace, Andrea Tittle, and Roger.

Coar was an avid golfer and sailor. He died at his home in Roanoke, Virginia on December 29, 2013.
