= George Westinghouse Medal =

The George Westinghouse Medal is named for George Westinghouse and awarded to in honor of "eminent achievement or distinguished service in the power field of mechanical engineering" by the American Society of Mechanical Engineers. There is a Gold medal (with a $1500 award) and a Silver medal (with a $1000 award). The silver medal may only be awarded to someone under 45 years of age.

== Recipients ==
Source: ASME

=== Gold ===
- 1953: Alexander G. Christie
- 1954: Walker L. Cisler
- 1955: Hyman G. Rickover
- 1956: Perry W. Pratt
- 1957: Alfred Iddles
- 1958: Frederick P. Fairchild
- 1960: Ernest C. Gaston
- 1961: Gerald V. Williamson
- 1962: Edwin H. Kreig
- 1963: Abbott L. Penniman, Jr.
- 1964: Frederick W. Argue
- 1965: Robert A. Bowman
- 1966: Robert C. Allen
- 1967: Robert A. Baker, Sr.
- 1968: Roland A. Budenholzer
- 1969: Ralph C. Roe
- 1970: Charles A. Meyer, Robert C. Spencer, Jr.
- 1971: Wilfred McGregor Hall
- 1972: William S. Lee
- 1973: Bernard F. Langer
- 1974: Charles W. Elston
- 1976: John W. Simpson
- 1978: Peter Fortescue
- 1979: William R. Gould
- 1980: Fred J. Moody
- 1981: Earle C. Miller
- 1982: William T. Reid
- 1983: Eugene P. Wilkinson
- 1984: Joseph R. Szydlowski
- 1985: Eugene A. Saltarelli
- 1986: Richard J. Coar
- 1987: Henry O. Pohl
- 1988: Warren A. Rhoades, Jr.
- 1989: J. Ed Smith
- 1990: John J. Taylor
- 1991: Ralph J. Ortolano
- 1992: Daniel R. Wilkins
- 1993: Frederick W. Buckman
- 1995: Thomas H. McCloskey
- 1998: Ashwani K. Gupta
- 1999: Atambir S. Rao
- 2000: David G. Lilley
- 2001: Janos M. Beer
- 2002: Arthur H. Lefebvre
- 2003: Yassin A. Hassan
- 2004: Adel F. Sarofim
- 2005: Subramanyam R. Gollahalli
- 2006: Ben T. Zinn
- 2007: Roman Weber
- 2008: Edwin A. Harvego
- 2009: Essam E. Khalil
- 2010: Włodzimierz Błasiak
- 2011: Nicholas Syred
- 2012: Richard R. Schultz
- 2013: Yiannis A. Levendis
- 2014: Ryoichi S. Amano
- 2015: Karen A. Thole
- 2016: Kenneth Bray
- 2017: Alan Williams
- 2018: Timothy C. Lieuwen
- 2019: Hameed Metghalchi
- 2020: Darrell W. Pepper
- 2021: Jovica Riznic
- 2023: George Tsatsaronis
- 2024: Robert M. Wagner

=== Silver ===
- 1972: William E. Rice
- 1973: Michael A. Ambrose
- 1974: Shelby L. Owens
- 1976: Richard V. Shanklin III
- 1977: James C. Corman
- 1978: Romano Salvatori
- 1979: Edward W. Stenby
- 1980: Robert L. Gamble
- 1981: Ronald Pigott
- 1982: Leslie D. Kramer
- 1983: Remco P. Waszink
- 1984: William J. Bryan
- 1986: Joseph A. Barsin
- 1987: Albert D. LaRue
- 1989: Leslie D. Kramer
- 1990: Atambir S. Rao
- 1991: John B. Kitto, Jr.
- 1993: Stephen R. Reid
- 1995: V.K. "Bindi" Chexal
- 1998: Ting Wang
- 2001: Susumu Mochida
- 2003: Jason E. Jenkins
- 2005: Andrzej Szlek
- 2009: Somrat Kerdsuwan
- 2010: Timothy C. Lieuwen
- 2011: Margaret S. Wooldridge
- 2012: Weihong Yang
- 2015: Angela Violi
- 2016: Elia Merzari
- 2017: Frédéric Villeneuve
- 2020: Sibendu Som
- 2021: Brian M. Wodka
- 2023: Stephen Lynch
- 2024: David "Bobby" Noble

== See also ==
- List of mechanical engineering awards
