= Astraxanovka =

Municipality in Oghuz, Azerbaijan

- Municipality
- Location within Azerbaijan Location within Shaki-Zagatala Economic Region
- Coordinates: 40°47′08″N 47°33′10″E
- Country: Azerbaijan
- Rayon: Oghuz

Population
  - Total: 587
- Time zone: UTC+4 (AZT)
  - Summer (DST): UTC+5 (AZT)

Astraxanovka (also, Astrakhanovka and Novaya Astrakhanovka) is a village and municipality in the Oghuz Rayon of Azerbaijan. It has a population of 587. The municipality consists of the villages of Astraxanovka and Vladimirovka.
