= Tambovsky District =

Location of Amur Oblast in Russia

Location of Tambov Oblast in Russia

Tambovsky District (Russian: Тамбо́вский райо́н) is the name of several administrative and municipal districts in Russia:

- Tambovsky District, Amur Oblast, an administrative and municipal district of Amur Oblast
- Tambovsky District, Tambov Oblast, an administrative and municipal district of Tambov Oblast

== See also ==
- Tambovsky (disambiguation)
