= Obraztsovoye =

Obraztsovoye Образцовое Образцовэр
- Village
- Location within Republic of Adygea Location within Russia
- Coordinates: 44°52′N 40°11′E
- Country: Russia
- Region: Adygea
- District: Giaginsky District
- Time zone: UTC+3:00

Obraztsovoye (Russian: Образцовое; Adyghe: Образцовэр) is a rural locality (a selo) in Ayryumovskoye Rural Settlement of Giaginsky District, Adygea, Russia. The population was 361 as of 2018. There are 3 streets.

== Geography ==
The village is located on the Ayrym River, 13 km east of Giaginskaya (the district's administrative centre) by road. Progress is the nearest rural locality.
