= Vladimirovskoye, Republic of Adygea =

Vladimirovskoye Владимировское Владимировскэр
- Village
- Location within Republic of Adygea Location within Russia
- Coordinates: 44°45′N 40°11′E
- Country: Russia
- Region: Adygea
- District: Giaginsky District
- Time zone: UTC+3:00

Vladimirovskoye (Russian: Владимировское; Adyghe: Владимировскэр) is a rural locality (a selo) in Kelermesskoye Rural Settlement of Giaginsky District, Adygea, Russia. The population was 88 as of 2018. There are 4 streets.

== Geography ==
Vladimirovskoye is located 19 km southeast of Giaginskaya (the district's administrative centre) by road. Tkachyov is the nearest rural locality.
