= Tambovsky, Republic of Adygea =

Rural locality in Sergiyevskoye Rural Settlement of Giaginsky District, Adygea, Russia

Tambovsky Тамбовский Тамбовскэр
- Khutor
- Location within Republic of Adygea Location within Russia
- Coordinates: 44°45′N 40°22′E
- Country: Russia
- Region: Adygea
- District: Giaginsky District
- Time zone: UTC+3:00

Tambovsky (Russian: Тамбовский; Adyghe: Тамбовскэр) is a rural locality (a khutor) in Sergiyevskoye Rural Settlement of Giaginsky District, Adygea, Russia. The population of this village was 591 as of 2018. There are 8 streets.

== Geography ==
The khutor is located on the right bank of the Fars River, 40 km southeast of Giaginskaya (the district's administrative centre) by road. Yekaterinovsky is the nearest rural locality.

== Ethnicity ==
The khutor is inhabited by Russians.
