= Wladimir Zwalf =

Wladimir Zwalf (1932-2002) was a Sanskritist and expert on Buddhist art and iconography in India and Tibet. An Assistant Keeper at the British Museum, he produced A Catalogue of Gandharan Sculpture in the British Museum (1996).

== Life and career ==
Zwalf was born on 30 August 1932. He studied Sanskrit at Oxford (Lincoln College, 1952–1955), under Professor Thomas Burrow. In 1957, he was appointed Assistant Keeper of Indian Printed Books and Manuscripts at the India Office Library. He kept this title when he transferred to the Department of Oriental Antiquities at the British Museum in 1962, where he worked until he retired in 1993. He died on 15 September 2002.

== Publications ==
- The Shrines of Gandhara (British Museum, London, 1979)
- The Heritage of Tibet (British Museum, London, 1981)
- (ed. with W. A. Oddy) Aspects of Tibetan Metallurgy (British Museum, 1981)
- (ed.) Buddhism: Art and Faith (British Museum, London, 1985)
- A Catalogue of Gandharan Sculpture in the British Museum, 2 vols (British Museum, London 1996)
