= Vladimirovo =

Vladimirovo may refer to:

Bulgaria

- Vladimirovo, Dobrich Province, in Dobrichka municipality
- Vladimirovo, Haskovo Province, in Topolovgrad municipality
- Vladimirovo, Montana Province, in Boychinovtsi municipality

North Macedonia

- Vladimirovo, Berovo
