= Vladimirovsky =

Vladimirovsky (Russian: Владимировский; masculine), Vladimirovskaya (Владимировская; feminine), or Vladimirovskoye (Владимировское; neuter) is the name of several rural localities in Russia:

- Vladimirovsky, Kursk Oblast, a settlement in Dmitriyevsky District of Kursk Oblast
- Vladimirovsky, Oryol Oblast, a settlement in Bolkhovsky District of Oryol Oblast
- Vladimirovsky, name of several other rural localities
- Vladimirovskaya, a stanitsa in Krasnosulinsky District of Rostov Oblast
- Vladimirovskoye, Republic of Adygea, a settlement in Giaginsky District of the Republic of Adygea
- Vladimirovskoye, Novosibirsk Oblast, a selo in Ubinsky District of Novosibirsk Oblast
- Vladimirovskoye, Smolensk Oblast, a village in Safonovsky District of Smolensk Oblast
