= Uladzimir =

Uladzimir, Uładzimir (Belarusian: Уладзімір) is a given name. It is the Belarusian equivalent of Vladimir (Russian: Владимир), Volodymyr (Ukrainian: Володимир), Włodzimierz (Polish) and Vladimir (Bulgarian: Владимир) (Bulgarian). The name may refer to:

- Uładzimir Arłou (born 1953), Belarusian historian, writer, politician and poet
- Uladzimir Bushma (born 1983), Belarusian footballer
- Uladzimir Dubouka (1900–1976), Belarusian poet, prose writer, linguist and literary critic
- Uładzimir Hančaryk (born 1940), Belarusian politician
- Uladzimir Harakhavik (born 1995), Belarusian cyclist
- Uladzimir Hayew (born 1977), Belarusian footballer
- Uladzimir Ignatik (born 1990), Belarusian professional tennis player
- Uladzimir Izotau (born 1988), Belarusian para-swimmer
- Uladzimir Karatkievich (1930–1984), Belarusian romantic writer
- Uladzimir Karvat (1959–1996), Belarusian pilot
- Uladzimir Karytska (born 1979), Belarusian footballer
- Uladzimir Karyzna (1938–2026), Belarusian poet and songwriter
- Uładzimir Katkoŭski (1976–2007), Belarusian blogger, web designer and website creator
- Uladzimir Kazlou (born 1985), Belarusian javelin thrower
- Uladzimir Khilkevich (born 1987), Belarusian footballer
- Uladzimir Khvashchynski (born 1990), Belarusian footballer
- Uladzimir Konan (1934–2011), Belarusian philosopher
- Uladzimir Mackievič (born 1956), Belarusian philosopher and social and political activist
- Uladzimir Makowski (born 1977), Belarusian football coach
- Uladzimir Malyshaw (born 1969), Belarusian football coach
- Uladzimir Marhulets (born 1984), Belarusian footballer
- Uladzimir Maroz (born 1985), Belarusian footballer
- Uladzimir Mihurski (born 1968), Belarusian footballer
- Uladzimir Naumau (born 1956), Belarusian politician
- Uladzimir Nyaklyayew (born 1946), Belarusian poet, writer and politician
- Uladzimir Sasimovich (born 1968), Belarusian javelin writer
- Uladzimir Shakaw (born 1984), Belarusian footballer
- Uladzimir Shuneyka (born 1974), Belarusian footballer
- Uladzimir Syanko (born 1946), Belarusian politician and diplomat
- Uladzimir Tsesler (born 1951), Belarusian artist and designer
- Uladzimir Vostrykaw (1976–2025), Belarusian football player and coach
- Uladzimir Zhuravel (born 1971), Belarusian professional football coach and a former player
- Uladzimir Zhuraw (born 1991), Belarusian footballer
- Uladzimir Zhyharau (born 1992), Belarusian swimmer
- Uładzimir Žyłka (1900–1933), Belarusian poet
