= Metropolitan Vladimir =

Metropolitan Vladimir may refer to:

- Volodymyr Sabodan (1935–2014), head of the Ukrainian Orthodox Church (Moscow Patriarchate)
- Vladimir Bogoyavlensky (1848–1918), Metropolitan of Moscow
