= Vladimirov =

Vladimirov (Russian: Владимиров) or Vladimirova (feminine; Russian: Владимирова) is a Russian and Bulgarian surname, that is derived from the male given name Vladimir and literally means Vladimir's.

People with the surname:

- Boris Vladimirov (1905–1978), Soviet army officer and Hero of the Soviet Union
- Emil Vladimirov (born 1952), Bulgarian discus thrower
- Igor Vladimirov (1919–1999), Soviet film actor, director, and teacher
- Ivan Vladimirov (1869–1947), Russian/Soviet painter and graphic artist
- Joseph Vladimirov, Russian painter of the 17th century
- Mikhail Vladimirov (1918–1992), Soviet aircraft pilot and Hero of the Soviet Union
- Miron Vladimirov (1879–1925), Soviet bureaucrat
- Peter Vladimirov (1905–1953), author of The Vladimirov Diaries
- Vasily Vladimirov (1923–2012), Soviet mathematician and academician
- Viktor Vladimirov (died 1995), Soviet general in Finland
- Vladimir Vladimirov (born 1986), Bulgarian footballer
- Vladimir Vladimirov (politician) (born 1975), Russian politician and governor of Stavropol Krai
- Vladimir Vladimirov (1914–1943), Soviet army officer and Hero of the Soviet Union
- Yevgeniy Vladimirov (born 1957), Soviet and Kazakh chess player
- Yuri Vladimirov (1942–2025), Russian Bolshoi Ballet dancer

== See also ==
- Vladimiroff
- Vladimir (disambiguation)
- Vladimirovsky
