= Vladimir Kniller =

Russian footballer and coach

Personal information
- Full name: Vladimir Arturovich Kniller
- Date of birth: 8 July 1964 (age 62)
- Place of birth: Alma-Ata, Kazakh SSR, Soviet Union
- Height: 1.86 m (6 ft 1 in)
- Positions: Defender; midfielder

Youth career
- FC Trud Kurgan

Senior career*
Years	Team	Apps	(Gls)
1982–1992	FC Sibir Kurgan		
1993–1994	FC Dynamo-Gazovik Tyumen	34	(0)
1994–2000	FC Spartak Kurgan	113	(3)
2000–2001	FC Rusich Kurgan		

Managerial career
- 1998: FC Sibir Kurgan (assistant)
- 2001–2002: FC Tobol Kurgan
- * Club domestic league appearances and goals

Vladimir Arturovich Kniller (Russian: Владимир Артурович Книллер; born 8 July 1964) is a Russian football coach and a former player.

Kniller made a single appearance in the Russian Premier League with FC Dynamo-Gazovik Tyumen.
