= Progress, Kugarchinsky District, Republic of Bashkortostan =

Progress Прогресс
- Khutor
- Location within Bashkortostan Location within Russia
- Coordinates: 52°37′N 56°20′E
- Country: Russia
- Region: Bashkortostan
- District: Kugarchinsky District
- Time zone: UTC+5:00

Progress (Russian: Прогресс) is a rural locality (a khutor) in Tlyaumbetovsky Selsoviet, Kugarchinsky District, Bashkortostan, Russia. The population was 11 as of 2010. There are 2 streets.

== Geography ==
Progress is located 41 km southwest of Mrakovo (the district's administrative centre) by road. Tavakanovo is the nearest rural locality.
