= Tambovsky, Romanovsky District, Altai Krai =

Tambovsky Тамбовский
- Settlement
- Location within Altai Krai Location within Russia
- Coordinates: 52°39′N 80°59′E
- Country: Russia
- Region: Altai Krai
- District: Romanovsky District
- Time zone: UTC+7:00

Tambovsky (Russian: Тамбовский) is a rural locality (a settlement) and the administrative center of Tambovsky Selsoviet, Romanovsky District, Altai Krai, Russia. The population was 808 as of 2013. There are 11 streets.

== Geography ==
Tambovsky is located 29 km northwest of Romanovo (the district's administrative centre) by road. Dubrovino and Zakladnoye are the nearest rural localities.
