= Progress, Vologda Oblast =

Progress Прогресс
- Village
- Location within Vologda Oblast Location within Russia
- Coordinates: 59°11′N 38°30′E
- Country: Russia
- Region: Vologda Oblast
- District: Sheksninsky District
- Time zone: UTC+3:00

Progress (Russian: Прогресс) is a rural locality (a village) and the administrative center of Nikolskoye Rural Settlement, Sheksninsky District, Vologda Oblast, Russia. The population was 579 as of 2002. There are 7 streets.

== Geography ==
Progress is located 2 km south of Sheksna (the district's administrative centre) by road. Sheksna is the nearest rural locality.
