= Vladimirsky (rural locality) =

Vladimirsky (Russian: Владимирский; masculine), Vladimirskaya (Владимирская; feminine), or Vladimirskoye (Владимирское; neuter) is the name of several rural localities (settlements, selos, villages, and stanitsas) in Russia:

- Vladimirsky, Oryol Oblast, a settlement in Druzhensky Selsoviet of Dmitrovsky District of Oryol Oblast
- Vladimirsky, Penza Oblast, a settlement in Lopatinsky Selsoviet of Lopatinsky District of Penza Oblast
- Vladimirsky, Saratov Oblast, a settlement in Rovensky District of Saratov Oblast
- Vladimirskoye, Mari El Republic, a selo in Krasnovolzhsky Rural Okrug of Gornomariysky District of the Mari El Republic
- Vladimirskoye, Nizhny Novgorod Oblast, a selo in Vladimirsky Selsoviet of Voskresensky District of Nizhny Novgorod Oblast
- Vladimirskoye, Smolensk Oblast, a village in Pechatnikovskoye Rural Settlement of Kholm-Zhirkovsky District of Smolensk Oblast
- Vladimirskoye, Tula Oblast, a selo in Samarskaya Volost of Kurkinsky District of Tula Oblast
- Vladimirskaya, Krasnodar Krai, a stanitsa in Vladimirsky Rural Okrug of Labinsky District of Krasnodar Krai
- Vladimirskaya, Leningrad Oblast, a settlement of the crossing in Susaninskoye Settlement Municipal Formation of Gatchinsky District of Leningrad Oblast
- Vladimirskaya, Smolensk Oblast, a village in Divasovskoye Rural Settlement of Smolensky District of Smolensk Oblast

== See also ==
- Vladimirsky Lager, a rural locality in Pskov Oblast
