= Von Vladimiroff =

The von Vladimiroff (Russian: Владимиров) family are a cadet branch of the von Biron family, the last rulers of the Duchy of Courland and Semigalia (German: Kurland, Latvian: Kurzeme). The family was founded by Neo-Aleksandr I von Valdimiroff, the issue of Yevdokiya Yusupova and Peter von Biron, although the pair officially had no children. As Peter von Biron's first child, many view Neo-Aleksandr I von Vladimiroff and the family as the rightful inheritors of his estate. The faction are the last known pretenders to the Duchy of Courland and Semigalia.

== History ==
The founder of the house, Neo-Aleksandr I von Valdimiroff, was the child of Yevdokiya Yusupova and Peter von Biron and is only mentioned by the Dukes third wife Dorothea von Medem in her private letters. The Duchess wrote about the child on very few occasions and expressed her loathing for him. The Duke and third Duchess had the boy baptized as a Lutheran, but it infuriated his father and stepmother that he never renounced the Orthodox Church.
