= Włodzimierz Błasiak =

Polish engineer

- Awards: George Westinghouse Medal (2010)
- Scientific career
- Fields: organic chemistry; mineralogy; pyrolysis; energy engineering; waste management
- Institutions: KTH Royal Institute of Technology

Włodzimierz Błasiak (Polish: [vwɔˈd͡ʑimjɛʐ ˈbwaɕak]; is a Polish engineer and Professor at the Department of Materials Science and Engineering of the KTH Royal Institute of Technology in Stockholm. He is known for research in the areas of mineralogy, waste management, pyrolysis, energy engineering and plasma gasification. He is the winner of the 2010 George Westinghouse Medal.

== Life and career ==
Since 1989, he has worked at the KTH Royal Institute of Technology where he came to from Poland as a post-doctoral student. He conducts research primarily in the field of mineralogy and waste management.

Together with Jan Grimbrandt, he is the co-founder of industrial cleantech company Boson Energy.

In 2010, he received the George Westinghouse Medal awarded for "eminent achievement or distinguished service in the power field of mechanical engineering" by the American Society of Mechanical Engineers (ASME).

== Selected publications ==
- High Temperature Air Combustion (HiTAC) Phenomena and its Thermodynamics (with Nabil Elias Rafidi and Ashwani K. Gupta, 2014)
- Biomass char burnout properties in a pulverized coal boiler after 100% fuel switch (with Jun Li and Weihong Yang, 2014)
- Effect of zeolite to binder ratio on product yields and composition during catalytic steam pyrolysis of biomass over transition metal modified HZSM5 (with Efthymios Kantarelis, and Weihong Yang, 2014)
- Co-firing based on biomass torrefaction in a pulverized coal boiler with aim of 100% fuel switching (with Xiaolei Zhang, Jun Li, and Weihong Yang, 2013)
- Thermal decomposition mechanism of levoglucosan during cellulose pyrolysis (with Xiaolei Zhang and Weihong Yang, 2012)
- Change of pyrolysis characteristics and structure of woody biomass due to steam explosion pretreatment (with Amit Kumar Biswas, Kentaro Umeki and Weihong Yang, 2011)
- Recycling of automobile shredder residue with a microwave pyrolysis combined with high temperature steam gasification (with Pawel Donaj, Weihong Yang, and Christer Forsgren, 2010)
- The Influence of Oxide Scale on Heat Transfer during Reheating of Steel (with Patrik Wikström and Weihong Yang, 2008)

== See also ==
- List of Polish engineers
- Timeline of Polish science and technology
