= Vladimiro =

- Gender: masculine

Other names
- See also: Vladimir

Vladimiro is a male given name deriving from the Slavic name Vladimir.

Those bearing it include:

- Vladimiro Montesinos (born 1946, in Arequipa), Peruvian intelligence officer
- Vladimiro Schettina (born 1955, in Asunción), Paraguayan football defender
- Vladimiro Roca (born 1942, in Havana), Cuban dissident and leader of the illegal Cuban Social-Democratic Party
- Vladimiro Tarnawsky (born 1939, in Ukraine), Ukrainian-Argentine football goalkeeper
- (Vladimiro) Ariel Dorfman (born 1942, in Buenos Aires), Chilean-American novelist, playwright, essayist, academic, and human rights activist
- Vladimiro (Wladimiro) Guadagno a.k.a. Vladimir Luxuria (born 1965, in Foggia), Italian transgender politician
