= Tambovsky, Kamensky District, Altai Krai =

Tambovsky Тамбовский
- Settlement
- Location within Altai Krai Location within Russia
- Coordinates: 53°42′N 80°53′E
- Country: Russia
- Region: Altai Krai
- District: Kamensky District
- Time zone: UTC+7:00

Tambovsky (Russian: Тамбовский) is a rural locality (a settlement) in Tolstovsky Selsoviet, Kamensky District, Altai Krai, Russia. The population was 108 as of 2013. There is 1 street.

== Geography ==
Tambovsky is located 40 km southwest of Kamen-na-Obi (the district's administrative centre) by road. Tolstovsky is the nearest rural locality.
