= Progress, Yanaulsky District, Republic of Bashkortostan =

Progress Прогресс
- Selo
- Location within Bashkortostan Location within Russia
- Coordinates: 56°14′N 54°43′E
- Country: Russia
- Region: Bashkortostan
- District: Yanaulsky District
- Time zone: UTC+5:00

Progress (Russian: Прогресс) is a rural locality (a selo) in Kisak-Kainsky Selsoviet, Yanaulsky District, Bashkortostan, Russia. The population was 596 as of 2010. There are 8 streets.

== Geography ==
Progress is located 20 km west of Yanaul (the district's administrative centre) by road. Aybulyak is the nearest rural locality.
