= Progress, Voronezh Oblast =

Progress Прогресс
- Settlement
- Location within Voronezh Oblast Location within Russia
- Coordinates: 51°35′N 40°29′E
- Country: Russia
- Region: Voronezh Oblast
- District: Anninsky District
- Time zone: UTC+3:00

Progress (Russian: Прогресс) is a rural locality (a settlement) in Rubashevskoye Rural Settlement, Anninsky District, Voronezh Oblast, Russia. The population was 125 as of 2010. There are 2 streets.

== Geography ==
Progress is located 19 km north of Anna (the district's administrative centre) by road. Bolshiye Yasyrki is the nearest rural locality.
