= Angela Violi =

Italian and American combustion engineer

Angela Violi is an Italian and American combustion engineer whose research topics include chemical kinetics, aerosols, the creation of nanoparticles from combustion, and nanoscale self-assembly. She is Arthur F. Thurnau Professor at the University of Michigan, in the Departments of Mechanical Engineering, Biomedical Engineering, Macromolecular Science and Engineering, Biophysics, Applied Physics, and Chemical Engineering.

== Education and career ==
Violi studied in chemical engineering at the University of Naples Federico II, earning a laurea in 1994 and completing her Ph.D. in 1999. After postdoctoral research at the University of Utah, she stayed on at the University of Utah as a research professor until moving to the University of Michigan as an assistant professor in 2006. She became associate professor in 2009 and full professor in 2015, and was named Arthur F. Thurnau Professor in 2020.

== Recognition ==
Violi was the 2015 winner of the George Westinghouse Silver Medal of the American Society of Mechanical Engineers, "for career efforts that have focused on high-temperature chemically reacting systems, which are critical to widespread applications including energy utilization and advanced materials". She was the 2017 winner of the Adel Sarofim Award, given for "outstanding advancements in understanding combustion processes, formation of combustion by-products and mechanisms of their health effects" at the International Congress on Combustion By-Product and Their Health Effects, and was one of three winners of the 2019 J. Cordell Breed Award for Women Leaders of SAE International.

She was elected to the 2019 class of Fellows of The Combustion Institute, "for outstanding contributions to the fundamental research of soot modeling, pioneering the use of multiscale molecular dynamics simulations in combustion".
