= Krasny Pakhar, Volgograd Oblast =

Krasny Pakhar Красный Пахарь
- Khutor
- Location within Volgograd Oblast Location within Russia
- Coordinates: 48°47′N 44°14′E
- Country: Russia
- Region: Volgograd Oblast
- District: Gorodishchensky District
- Time zone: UTC+4:00

Krasny Pakhar (Russian: Красный Пахарь) is a rural locality (a khutor) and the administrative center of Krasnopakharevskoye Rural Settlement, Gorodishchensky District, Volgograd Oblast, Russia. The population was 553 as of 2010. There are 9 streets.

== Geography ==
Krasny Pakhar is located in steppe, on the right bank of the Rossoshka River, 35 km west of Gorodishche (the district's administrative centre) by road. Stepnoy is the nearest rural locality.
