= Pečkovo =

- Village
- Печково
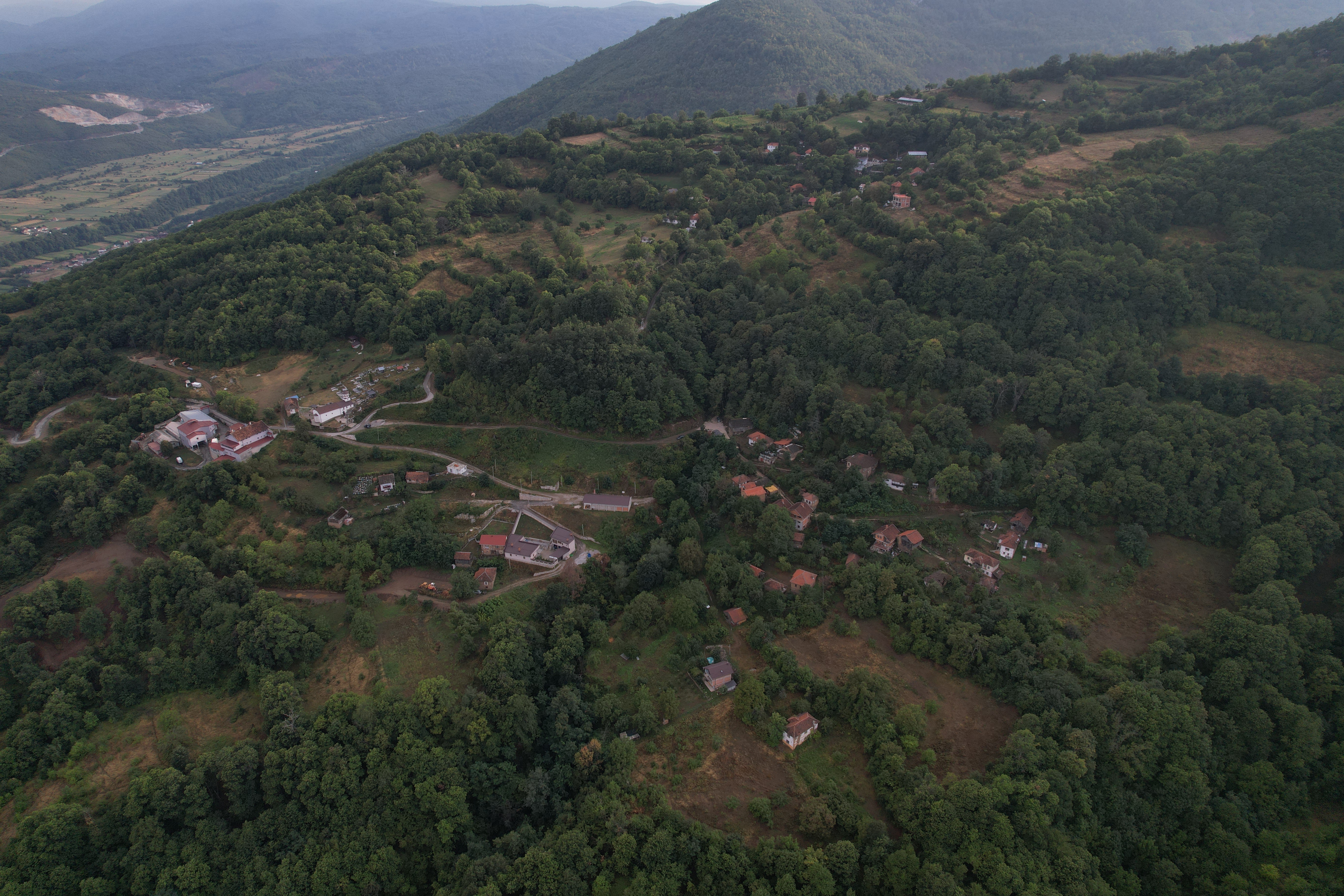
- Airview of the village

- Location within North Macedonia
- Coordinates: 41°47′N 20°50′E
- Country: North Macedonia
- Region: Polog
- Municipality: Gostivar

Population (2002)
  - Total: 48
- Time zone: UTC+1 (CET)
  - Summer (DST): UTC+2 (CEST)
- Car plates: GV
- Website: .

Pečkovo (Macedonian: Печково) is a village in the municipality of Gostivar, North Macedonia.

== Demographics ==
Pečkovo is attested in the 1467/68 Ottoman tax registry (defter) for the Nahiyah of Kalkandelen. The village had a total of 35 Christian households and 2 bachelors.

According to the 2002 census, the village had a total of 48 inhabitants. Ethnic groups in the village include:

- Macedonians 48

According to the 1942 Albanian census, Pečkovo was inhabited by 207 Serbophone Orthodox Albanians, 141 Serbs and 31 Bulgarians.
