= Nizami, Sabirabad =

Nizami
- Municipality
- Location within Azerbaijan
- Coordinates: 39°55′08″N 48°45′12″E
- Country: Azerbaijan
- Rayon: Sabirabad

Population
  - Total: 2,852
- Time zone: UTC+4 (AZT)
  - Summer (DST): UTC+5 (AZT)

Nizami (until 2004, Vladimirovka; formerly, Vladimirorskoe and Vladimiroskoye) is a village and municipality in the Sabirabad Rayon of Azerbaijan. In 2004, the village was renamed in honor of the poet Nizami. It has a population of 2,852.
