= Vladimirovka, Quba =

Vladimirovka
- Municipality
- Location within Azerbaijan
- Coordinates: 41°23′42″N 48°33′02″E
- Country: Azerbaijan
- Rayon: Quba

Population
  - Total: 2,492
- Time zone: UTC+4 (AZT)
  - Summer (DST): UTC+5 (AZT)

Vladimirovka is a village and municipality in the Quba Rayon of Azerbaijan. It has a population of 2,492.
