= Vladimirovka, Oghuz =

Vladimirovka
- Location within Azerbaijan Location within Shaki-Zagatala Economic Region
- Coordinates: 40°47′30″N 47°34′32″E
- Country: Azerbaijan
- Rayon: Oghuz
- Municipality: Astraxanovka
- Time zone: UTC+4 (AZT)
  - Summer (DST): UTC+5 (AZT)

Vladimirovka is a village in the Oghuz Rayon of Azerbaijan. The village forms part of the municipality of Astraxanovka.
