= Giaginsky District =

Giaginsky District Гиагинский район (Russian)
- District

Other transcription(s)
  - Adyghe: Джэджэ къедзыгъо
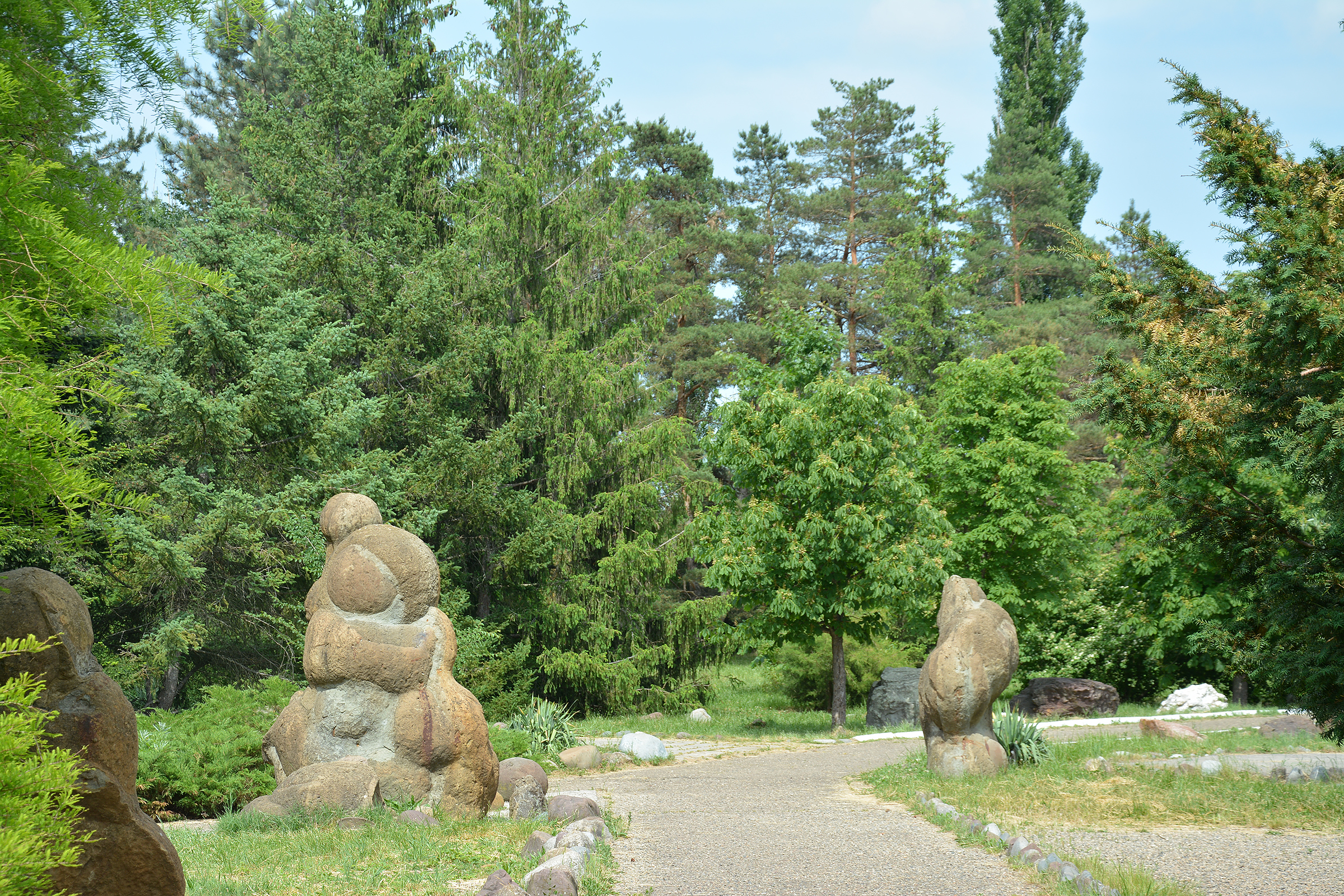
- Goncharka Dendrological Park, a protected area of Russia in Giaginsky District

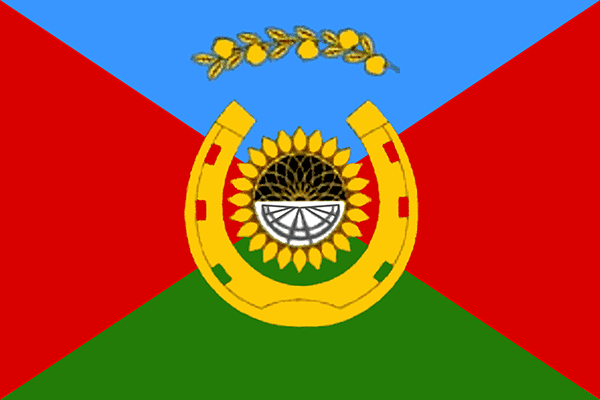
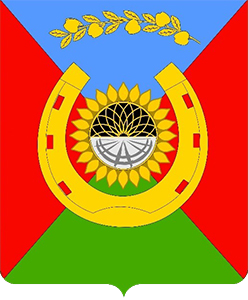
- Flag Coat of arms
- Location of Giaginsky District in the Republic of Adygea
- Coordinates: 44°53′N 40°03′E
- Country: Russia
- Federal subject: Republic of Adygea
- Established: December 31, 1934
- Administrative center: Giaginskaya

Government
  - Type: Local government
  - Head of Administration: Viktor Puklich

Area
  - Total: 756.54 km^{2} (292.10 sq mi)

Population (2010 Census)
  - Total: 31,766
  - Density: 41.989/km^{2} (108.75/sq mi)
  - Urban: 0%
  - Rural: 100%

Administrative structure
  - Inhabited localities: 30 rural localities

Municipal structure
  - Municipally incorporated as: Giaginsky Municipal District
  - Municipal divisions: 0 urban settlements, 5 rural settlements
- Time zone: UTC+3 (MSK)
- OKTMO ID: 79605000
- Website: http://www.mogiaginsk.ru/

Population of Giaginsky District
- 2010 Census: 31,766
- 2002 Census: 33,458
- 1989 Census: 32,060
- 1979 Census: 33,222

Giaginsky District (Russian: Гиаги́нский райо́н, romanized: Giaginsky rayon; Adyghe: Джэджэ къедзыгъо, romanized: Ǯʼăǯʼă qedzəġo) is an administrative and a municipal district (raion), one of the seven in the Republic of Adygea, Russia. It is located in the northern central portion of the republic and borders with Shovgenovsky District in the north, Koshekhablsky District in the east and northeast, Mostovsky District of Krasnodar Krai in the southeast, Maykopsky District in the south, and with Belorechensky District of Krasnodar Krai in the west. The area of the district is 756.54 square kilometers (292.10 sq mi). Its administrative center is the rural locality (a stanitsa) of Giaginskaya. As of the 2010 Census, the total population of the district was 31,766, with the population of Giaginskaya accounting for 44.5% of that number.

== History ==
Giaginsky District was established within Azov-Black Sea Krai on December 31, 1934 as a result of the downsizing of that krai's districts. On April 10, 1936, Khansky Selsoviet of Maykopsky District of the krai was merged into Giaginsky District and the latter, along with the city of Maykop, was transferred to Adyghe Autonomous Oblast. On February 1, 1963, Maykopsky District of Adyghe Autonomous Oblast was merged into Giaginsky District to create Giaginsky Rural District (Гиа́гинский се́льский райо́н). However, as the new system of rural districts did not prove to be efficient, Giaginsky District was re-instated in its pre-1963 borders on January 12, 1965.

== Administrative and municipal status ==
Within the framework of administrative divisions, Giaginsky District is one of the seven in the Republic of Adygea and has administrative jurisdiction over all of its thirty rural localities. As a municipal division, the district is incorporated as Giaginsky Municipal District. Its thirty rural localities are incorporated into five rural settlements within the municipal district. The stanitsa of Giaginskaya serves as the administrative center of both the administrative and municipal district.

Municipal composition
Rural settlements	Rural localities in jurisdiction*
Ayryumovskoye (Айрюмовское)	**settlement of Novy**; khutor of Krasny Khleborob; selo of Nizhny Ayryum; selo of Obraztsovoye; khutor of Progress; khutor of Sadovy
Dondukovskoye (Дондуковское)	**stanitsa of Dondukovskaya**; khutor of Nechayevsky; khutor of Smolchev-Malinovsky; khutor of Volno-Vesyoly
Giaginskoye (Гиагинское)	**stanitsa of Giaginskaya**; khutor of Cheryomushkin; settlement of Goncharka; khutor of Pervomaysky
Kelermesskoye (Келермесское)	**stanitsa of Kelermesskaya**; settlement of Lesnoy; settlement of Vladimirovskoye
Sergiyevskoye (Сергиевское)	**selo of Sergiyevskoye**; khutor of Dneprovsky; khutor of Farsovsky; selo of Georgiyevskoye; khutor of Kartsev; khutor of Kolkhozny; khutor of Kozopolyansky; khutor of Krasny Pakhar; khutor of Kursky; khutor of Mikhelsonovsky; khutor of Shishkinsky; khutor of Tambovsky; khutor of Yekaterinovsky

*Administrative centers are shown in bold
