= Giaginskaya =

Giaginskaya Гиагинская
- Stanitsa

Other transcription(s)
  - Adyghe: Джэджэ
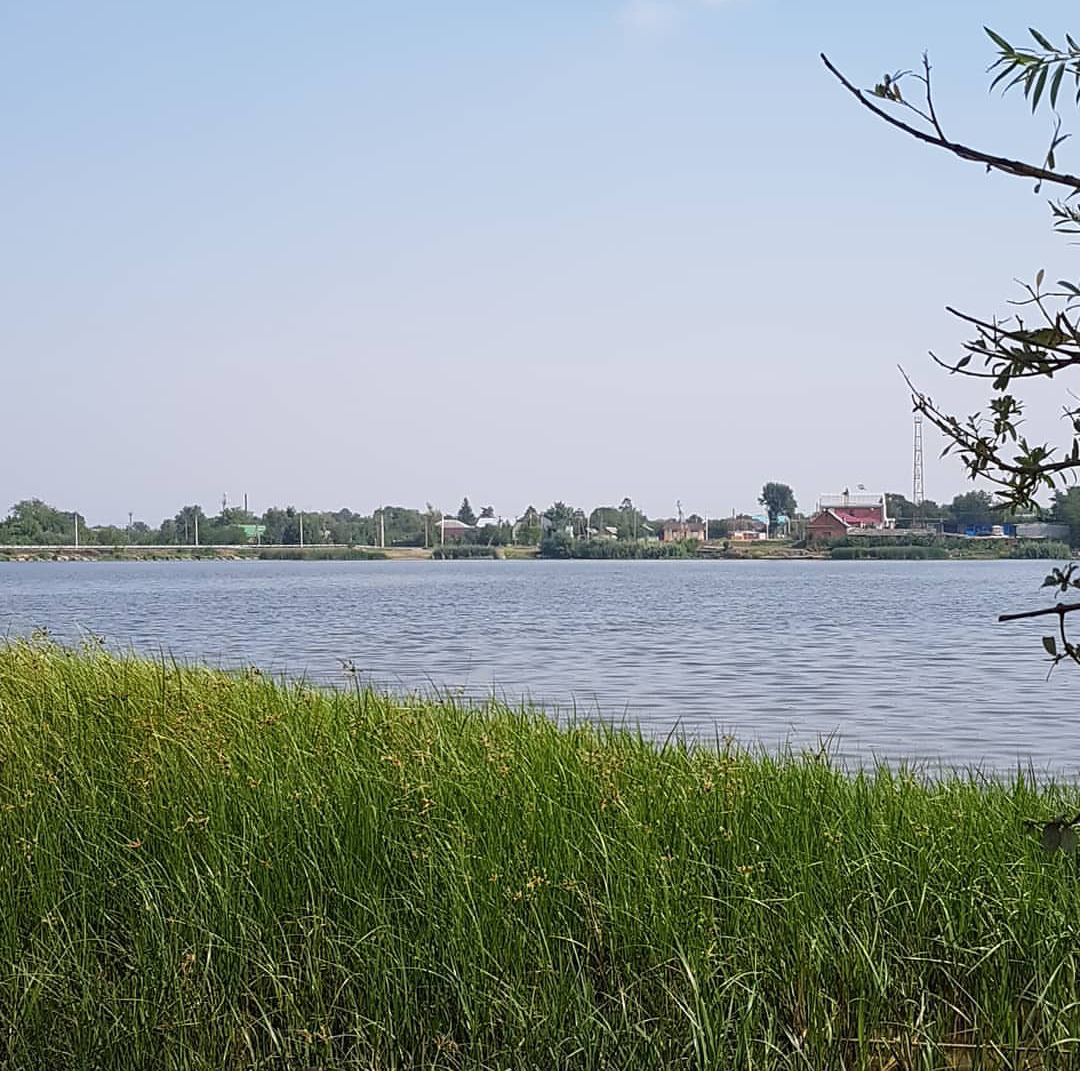

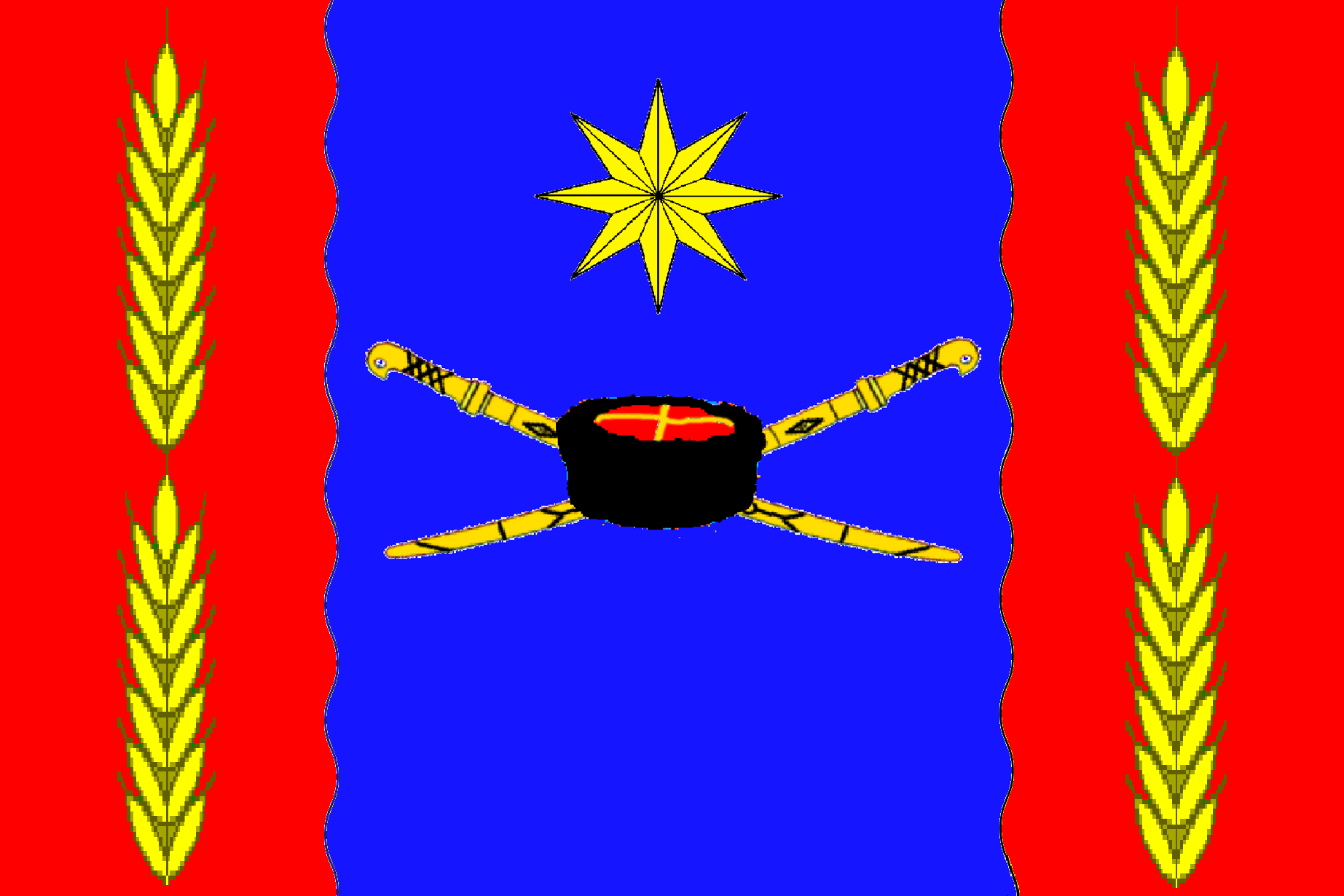
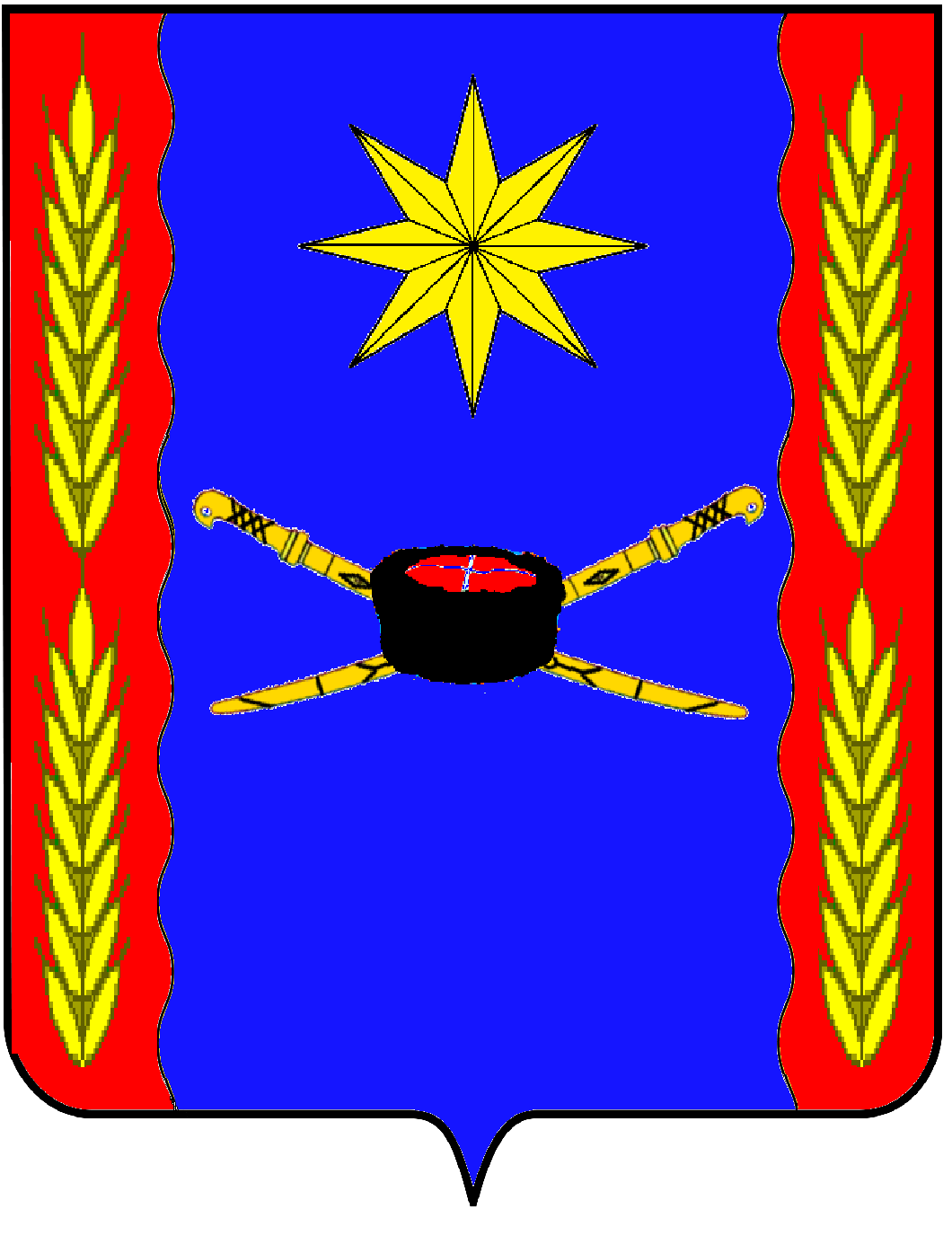
- Flag Coat of arms
- Interactive map of Giaginskaya
- Location of Giaginskaya Giaginskaya (Republic of Adygea)
- Coordinates: 44°52′10″N 40°3′58″E
- Country: Russia
- Federal subject: Adygea
- Administrative district: Giaginsky District
- Founded: 1862
- Elevation: 129 m (423 ft)

Population (2010 Census)
  - Total: 14,121
  - Estimate (2024): 14,338 (+1.5%)

Administrative status
  - Capital of: Giaginsky District
- Time zone: UTC+3 (MSK)
- Postal codes: 385600, 385601
- Dialing code: +7 87779
- OKTMO ID: 79605407101
- Website: admingsp.ru

Giaginskaya (Russian: Гиаги́нская; Adyghe: Джэджэ [d͡ʒad͡ʒa], Džədžə) is a rural locality (a stanitsa) and the administrative center of Giaginsky District of the Republic of Adygea, Russia, located 35 kilometers (22 mi) from Maykop. Population: 14,121 (2010 census); 15,160 (2002 census); 14,522 (1989 Soviet census). Giaginskaya is the most populous administrative center of a district in the republic, with its population accounting for 44.5% of the total population of Giaginsky District.

There are a railway station and a museum of local history in the stanitsa.
