= Ramenye =

Ramenye may refer to:

- Ramenye, Suzdalsky District, Vladimir Oblast
- Ramenye, Vyaznikovsky District, Vladimir Oblast
- Ramenye, Gryazovetsky District, Vologda Oblast
- Ramenye, Kichmengsko-Gorodetsky District, Vologda Oblast
- Ramenye, Sheksninsky District, Vologda Oblast
- Ramenye, Tarnogsky District, Vologda Oblast
