= Sergiyevsky (rural locality) =

Sergiyevsky (Russian: Сергиевский; masculine), Sergiyevskaya (Сергиевская; feminine), or Sergiyevskoye (Сергиевское; neuter) is the name of several rural localities (settlements, khutors, selos, villages, and stanitsas) in Russia:

- Sergiyevsky, Kolomensky District, Moscow Oblast, a settlement in Pestrikovskoye Rural Settlement of Kolomensky District of Moscow Oblast
- Sergiyevsky, Yegoryevsky District, Moscow Oblast, a settlement under the administrative jurisdiction of the Town of Yegoryevsk in Yegoryevsky District of Moscow Oblast
- Sergiyevsky, Ryazan Oblast, a settlement in Spassky Rural Okrug of Miloslavsky District of Ryazan Oblast
- Sergiyevsky, Saratov Oblast, a settlement in Saratovsky District of Saratov Oblast
- Sergiyevsky, Tula Oblast, a settlement in Prilepsky Rural Okrug of Leninsky District of Tula Oblast
- Sergiyevsky, Voronezh Oblast, a khutor in Aleksandrovskoye Rural Settlement of Talovsky District of Voronezh Oblast
- Sergiyevskoye, Republic of Adygea, a selo in Giaginsky District of the Republic of Adygea
- Sergiyevskoye, Ivanovo Oblast, a village in Ivanovsky District of Ivanovo Oblast
- Sergiyevskoye, Kursk Oblast, a selo in Sergiyevsky Selsoviet of Zolotukhinsky District of Kursk Oblast
- Sergiyevskoye, Moscow Oblast, a selo in Pestrikovskoye Rural Settlement of Kolomensky District of Moscow Oblast
- Sergiyevskoye, Livensky District, Oryol Oblast, a selo in Sergiyevsky Selsoviet of Livensky District of Oryol Oblast
- Sergiyevskoye, Mtsensky District, Oryol Oblast, a selo in Voinsky Selsoviet of Mtsensky District of Oryol Oblast
- Sergiyevskoye, Uritsky District, Oryol Oblast, a selo in Kotovsky Selsoviet of Uritsky District of Oryol Oblast
- Sergiyevskoye, Lipyagovsky Rural Okrug, Miloslavsky District, Ryazan Oblast, a selo in Lipyagovsky Rural Okrug of Miloslavsky District of Ryazan Oblast
- Sergiyevskoye, Spassky Rural Okrug, Miloslavsky District, Ryazan Oblast, a selo in Spassky Rural Okrug of Miloslavsky District of Ryazan Oblast
- Sergiyevskoye, Stavropol Krai, a selo in Sergiyevsky Selsoviet of Grachyovsky District of Stavropol Krai
- Sergiyevskoye, Kireyevsky District, Tula Oblast, a village in Bolshekalmyksky Rural Okrug of Kireyevsky District of Tula Oblast
- Sergiyevskoye, Kurkinsky District, Tula Oblast, a selo in Sergiyevskaya Volost of Kurkinsky District of Tula Oblast
- Sergiyevskoye, Tver Oblast, a village in Kalininsky District of Tver Oblast
- Sergiyevskoye, Yaroslavl Oblast, a selo in Maymersky Rural Okrug of Uglichsky District of Yaroslavl Oblast
- Sergiyevskaya, Krasnodar Krai, a stanitsa in Sergiyevsky Rural Okrug of Korenovsky District of Krasnodar Krai
- Sergiyevskaya, Volgograd Oblast, a stanitsa in Sergiyevsky Selsoviet of Danilovsky District of Volgograd Oblast
- Sergiyevskaya, Vologda Oblast, a village in Ramensky Selsoviet of Tarnogsky District of Vologda Oblast
