= Sluda =

Sluda (Russian: Слуда) is the name of several rural localities in Russia:

- Sluda, Kotlas, Arkhangelsk Oblast, a village under the administrative jurisdiction of the town of oblast significance of Kotlas, Arkhangelsk Oblast
- Sluda, Pinezhsky District, Arkhangelsk Oblast, a village in Sursky Selsoviet of Pinezhsky District of Arkhangelsk Oblast
- Sluda, Verkhnetoyemsky District, Arkhangelsk Oblast, a village in Puchuzhsky Selsoviet of Verkhnetoyemsky District of Arkhangelsk Oblast
- Sluda, Kostroma Oblast, a village in Povalikhinskoye Settlement of Chukhlomsky District of Kostroma Oblast
- Sluda, Vladimir Oblast, a village in Yuryev-Polsky District of Vladimir Oblast
- Sluda, Shestakovsky Selsoviet, Kichmengsko-Gorodetsky District, Vologda Oblast, a village in Shestakovsky Selsoviet of Kichmengsko-Gorodetsky District of Vologda Oblast
- Sluda, Shongsky Selsoviet, Kichmengsko-Gorodetsky District, Vologda Oblast, a village in Shongsky Selsoviet of Kichmengsko-Gorodetsky District of Vologda Oblast
- Sluda, Nikolsky District, Vologda Oblast, a village in Zelentsovsky Selsoviet of Nikolsky District of Vologda Oblast
- Sluda, Tarnogsky District, Vologda Oblast, a village in Shevdenitsky Selsoviet of Tarnogsky District of Vologda Oblast
- Sluda, Totemsky District, Vologda Oblast, a village in Medvedevsky Selsoviet of Totemsky District of Vologda Oblast
