= Mitinskaya, Tarnogsky District, Vologda Oblast =

Mitinskaya Митинская
- Village
- Location within Vologda Oblast Location within Russia
- Coordinates: 60°24′N 43°34′E
- Country: Russia
- Region: Vologda Oblast
- District: Tarnogsky District
- Time zone: UTC+3:00

Mitinskaya (Russian: Митинская) is a rural locality (a village) in Tarnogskoye Rural Settlement, Tarnogsky District, Vologda Oblast, Russia. The population was 5 as of 2002.

== Geography ==
Mitinskaya is located 14 km south of Tarnogsky Gorodok (the district's administrative centre) by road. Podgornaya is the nearest rural locality.
