= Kovrizhinskaya =

Kovrizhinskaya Коврижинская
- Village
- Location within Vologda Oblast Location within Russia
- Coordinates: 60°41′N 43°46′E
- Country: Russia
- Region: Vologda Oblast
- District: Tarnogsky District
- Time zone: UTC+3:00

Kovrizhinskaya (Russian: Коврижинская) is a rural locality (a village) in Tarnogskoye Rural Settlement, Tarnogsky District, Vologda Oblast, Russia. The population was 10 as of 2002.

== Geography ==
Kovrizhinskaya is located 33 km northeast of Tarnogsky Gorodok (the district's administrative centre) by road. Mitroshinskaya is the nearest rural locality.
