= Lyapinskaya =

Lyapinskaya Ляпинская
- Village
- Location within Vologda Oblast Location within Russia
- Coordinates: 60°27′N 43°03′E
- Country: Russia
- Region: Vologda Oblast
- District: Tarnogsky District
- Time zone: UTC+3:00

Lyapinskaya (Russian: Ляпинская) is a rural locality (a village) in Verkhovskoye Rural Settlement, Tarnogsky District, Vologda Oblast, Russia. The population was 3 as of 2002.

== Geography ==
Lyapinskaya is located 38 km west of Tarnogsky Gorodok (the district's administrative centre) by road. Yepifanovskaya is the nearest rural locality.
