= Filimonovskaya =

Filimonovskaya Филимоновская
- Village
- Location within Vologda Oblast Location within Russia
- Coordinates: 60°36′N 43°19′E
- Country: Russia
- Region: Vologda Oblast
- District: Tarnogsky District
- Time zone: UTC+3:00

Filimonovskaya (Russian: Филимоновская) is a rural locality (a village) in Spasskoye Rural Settlement, Tarnogsky District, Vologda Oblast, Russia. The population was 69 as of 2002.

== Geography ==
Filimonovskaya is located 23 km northwest of Tarnogsky Gorodok (the district's administrative centre) by road. Nizhnepauninskaya is the nearest rural locality.
