= Sludka, Tarnogsky District, Vologda Oblast =

Sludka Слудка
- Village
- Location within Vologda Oblast Location within Russia
- Coordinates: 60°27′N 42°57′E
- Country: Russia
- Region: Vologda Oblast
- District: Tarnogsky District
- Time zone: UTC+3:00

Sludka (Russian: Слудка) is a rural locality (a village) in Verkhovskoye Rural Settlement, Tarnogsky District, Vologda Oblast, Russia. The population was 1 as of 2002.

== Geography ==
Sludka is located 45 km southwest of Tarnogsky Gorodok (the district's administrative centre) by road. Maurnikovskaya is the nearest rural locality.
