= Baryshevskaya =

Baryshevskaya Барышевская
- Village
- Location within Vologda Oblast Location within Russia
- Coordinates: 60°42′N 43°05′E
- Country: Russia
- Region: Vologda Oblast
- District: Tarnogsky District
- Time zone: UTC+3:00

Baryshevskaya (Russian: Барышевская) is a rural locality (a village) in Spasskoye Rural Settlement, Tarnogsky District, Vologda Oblast, Russia. The population was 6 as of 2002.

== Geography ==
Baryshevskaya is located 39 km northwest of Tarnogsky Gorodok (the district's administrative centre) by road. Makarovskaya is the nearest rural locality.
