= Pogonyayevskaya =

Pogonyayevskaya Погоняевская
- Village
- Location within Vologda Oblast Location within Russia
- Coordinates: 60°32′N 43°36′E
- Country: Russia
- Region: Vologda Oblast
- District: Tarnogsky District
- Time zone: UTC+3:00

Pogonyayevskaya (Russian: Погоняевская) is a rural locality (a village) in Tarnogskoye Rural Settlement, Tarnogsky District, Vologda Oblast, Russia. The population was 59 as of 2002. There are two streets.

== Geography ==
Pogonyayevskaya is located 7 km northeast of Tarnogsky Gorodok (the district's administrative centre) by road. Mikheyevskaya is the nearest rural locality.
