= Isakovskaya, Tarnogsky District, Vologda Oblast =

Isakovskaya Исаковская
- Village
- Location within Vologda Oblast Location within Russia
- Coordinates: 60°30′N 43°31′E
- Country: Russia
- Region: Vologda Oblast
- District: Tarnogsky District
- Time zone: UTC+3:00

Isakovskaya (Russian: Исаковская) is a rural locality (a village) in Tarnogskoye Rural Settlement, Tarnogsky District, Vologda Oblast, Russia. The population was 45 as of 2002.

== Geography ==
Isakovskaya is located 7 km northwest of Tarnogsky Gorodok (the district's administrative centre) by road. Shkulevskaya is the nearest rural locality.
