= Feofilatovskaya =

Feofilatovskaya Феофилатовская
- Village
- Location within Vologda Oblast Location within Russia
- Coordinates: 60°34′N 43°29′E
- Country: Russia
- Region: Vologda Oblast
- District: Tarnogsky District
- Time zone: UTC+3:00

Feofilatovskaya (Russian: Феофилатовская) is a rural locality (a village) in Tarnogskoye Rural Settlement, Tarnogsky District, Vologda Oblast, Russia. The population was 18 as of 2002.

== Geography ==
Feofilatovskaya is located 15 km northwest of Tarnogsky Gorodok (the district's administrative centre) by road. Matveyevskaya is the nearest rural locality.
