= Tselkovskaya =

Tselkovskaya Целковская
- Village
- Location within Vologda Oblast Location within Russia
- Coordinates: 60°41′N 43°11′E
- Country: Russia
- Region: Vologda Oblast
- District: Tarnogsky District
- Time zone: UTC+3:00

Tselkovskaya (Russian: Целковская) is a rural locality (a village) in Spasskoye Rural Settlement, Tarnogsky District, Vologda Oblast, Russia. The population was 31 as of 2002.

== Geography ==
Tselkovskaya is located 35 km northwest of Tarnogsky Gorodok (the district's administrative centre) by road. Kharitonovskaya is the nearest rural locality.
