= Kriulya =

Kriulya Криуля
- Village
- Location within Vologda Oblast Location within Russia
- Coordinates: 60°27′N 43°51′E
- Country: Russia
- Region: Vologda Oblast
- District: Tarnogsky District
- Time zone: UTC+3:00

Kriulya (Russian: Криуля) is a rural locality (a village) in Markushevskoye Rural Settlement, Tarnogsky District, Vologda Oblast, Russia. The population was 42 as of 2002.

== Geography ==
Kriulya is located 23 km southeast of Tarnogsky Gorodok (the district's administrative centre) by road. Cherepanikha is the nearest rural locality.
