= Pyatovskaya =

Pyatovskaya Пятовская
- Village
- Location within Vologda Oblast Location within Russia
- Coordinates: 60°29′N 43°38′E
- Country: Russia
- Region: Vologda Oblast
- District: Tarnogsky District
- Time zone: UTC+3:00

Pyatovskaya (Russian: Пятовская) is a rural locality (a village) in Tarnogskoye Rural Settlement, Tarnogsky District, Vologda Oblast, Russia. The population was 19 as of 2002.

== Geography ==
Pyatovskaya is located 5 km southeast of Tarnogsky Gorodok (the district's administrative centre) by road. Tarnogsky Gorodok is the nearest rural locality.
