= Malakhovsky Bor =

Malakhovsky Bor Малаховский Бор
- Settlement
- Location within Vologda Oblast Location within Russia
- Coordinates: 60°30′N 43°31′E
- Country: Russia
- Region: Vologda Oblast
- District: Tarnogsky District
- Time zone: UTC+3:00

Malakhovsky Bor (Russian: Малаховский Бор) is a rural locality (a settlement) in Tarnogskoye Rural Settlement, Tarnogsky District, Vologda Oblast, Russia. The population was 13 as of 2002.

== Geography ==
Malakhovsky Bor is located 5 km west of Tarnogsky Gorodok (the district's administrative centre) by road. Igumnovskaya is the nearest rural locality.
