= Voshchar =

Voshchar Вощар
- Settlement
- Location within Vologda Oblast Location within Russia
- Coordinates: 60°41′N 43°22′E
- Country: Russia
- Region: Vologda Oblast
- District: Tarnogsky District
- Time zone: UTC+3:00

Voshchar (Russian: Вощар) is a rural locality (a settlement) in Spasskoye Rural Settlement, Tarnogsky District, Vologda Oblast, Russia. The population was 314 as of 2002.

== Geography ==
Voshchar is located 38 km northwest of Tarnogsky Gorodok (the district's administrative centre) by road. Spassky Pogost is the nearest rural locality.
