= Marachevskaya =

Marachevskaya Марачевская
- Village
- Location within Vologda Oblast Location within Russia
- Coordinates: 60°47′N 43°12′E
- Country: Russia
- Region: Vologda Oblast
- District: Tarnogsky District
- Time zone: UTC+3:00

Marachevskaya (Russian: Марачевская) is a rural locality (a village) in Spasskoye Rural Settlement, Tarnogsky District, Vologda Oblast, Russia. The population was 9 as of 2002.

== Geography ==
Marachevskaya is located 58 km northwest of Tarnogsky Gorodok (the district's administrative centre) by road. Yemelyanovskaya is the nearest rural locality.
