= Mikheyevskaya, Tarnogsky District, Vologda Oblast =

Mikheyevskaya Михеевская
- Village
- Location within Vologda Oblast Location within Russia
- Coordinates: 60°32′N 43°36′E
- Country: Russia
- Region: Vologda Oblast
- District: Tarnogsky District
- Time zone: UTC+3:00

Mikheyevskaya (Russian: Михеевская) is a rural locality (a village) in Tarnogskoye Rural Settlement, Tarnogsky District, Vologda Oblast, Russia. The population was 10 as of 2002.

== Geography ==
Mikheyevskaya is located 8 km northeast of Tarnogsky Gorodok (the district's administrative centre) by road. Pogonyayevskaya is the nearest rural locality.
