= Pavlomatveyevskaya =

Pavlomatveyevskaya Павломатвеевская
- Village
- Location within Vologda Oblast Location within Russia
- Coordinates: 60°41′N 43°49′E
- Country: Russia
- Region: Vologda Oblast
- District: Tarnogsky District
- Time zone: UTC+3:00

Pavlomatveyevskaya (Russian: Павломатвеевская) is a rural locality (a village) in Tarnogskoye Rural Settlement, Tarnogsky District, Vologda Oblast, Russia. The population was 12 as of 2002.

== Geography ==
Pavlomatveyevskaya is located 30 km northeast of Tarnogsky Gorodok (the district's administrative centre) by road. Alexandrovskaya is the nearest rural locality.
