= Kiyanskaya =

Kiyanskaya Киянская
- Village
- Location within Vologda Oblast Location within Russia
- Coordinates: 60°28′N 42°58′E
- Country: Russia
- Region: Vologda Oblast
- District: Tarnogsky District
- Time zone: UTC+3:00

Kiyanskaya (Russian: Киянская) is a rural locality (a village) in Verkhovskoye Rural Settlement, Tarnogsky District, Vologda Oblast, Russia. As of 2002 its population was 17.

== Geography ==
Kiyanskaya is located 41 km west of Tarnogsky Gorodok (the district's administrative centre) by road. Verkhovsky Pogost is the nearest rural locality.
