= Krotovskaya =

Krotovskaya Кротовская
- Village
- Location within Vologda Oblast Location within Russia
- Coordinates: 60°30′N 43°15′E
- Country: Russia
- Region: Vologda Oblast
- District: Tarnogsky District
- Time zone: UTC+3:00

Krotovskaya (Russian: Кротовская) is a rural locality (a village) in Zaborskoye Rural Settlement, Tarnogsky District, Vologda Oblast, Russia. The population was 17 as of 2002.

== Geography ==
Krotovskaya is located 21 km west of Tarnogsky Gorodok (the district's administrative centre) by road. Goryayevskaya is the nearest rural locality.
