= Budrinskaya =

Budrinskaya Будринская
- Village
- Location within Vologda Oblast Location within Russia
- Coordinates: 60°26′N 43°17′E
- Country: Russia
- Region: Vologda Oblast
- District: Tarnogsky District
- Time zone: UTC+3:00

Budrinskaya (Russian: Будринская) is a rural locality (a village) in Zaborskoye Rural Settlement, Tarnogsky District, Vologda Oblast, Russia. The population was 51 as of 2002, and was 28 as of 2010.

== Geography ==
Budrinskaya is located 23 km southwest of Tarnogsky Gorodok (the district's administrative centre) by road. Tyuprikha is the nearest rural locality.
