= Nesterikha, Tarnogsky District, Vologda Oblast =

Nesterikha Нестериха
- Village
- Location within Vologda Oblast Location within Russia
- Coordinates: 60°25′N 43°55′E
- Country: Russia
- Region: Vologda Oblast
- District: Tarnogsky District
- Time zone: UTC+3:00

Nesterikha (Russian: Нестериха) is a rural locality (a village) in Markushevskoye Rural Settlement, Tarnogsky District, Vologda Oblast, Russia. The population was 3 as of 2002.

== Geography ==
Nesterikha is located 23 km southeast of Tarnogsky Gorodok (the district's administrative centre) by road. Andreyevskaya is the nearest rural locality.
