= Durnevskaya =

Durnevskaya Дурневская
- Village
- Location within Vologda Oblast Location within Russia
- Coordinates: 60°41′N 43°49′E
- Country: Russia
- Region: Vologda Oblast
- District: Tarnogsky District
- Time zone: UTC+3:00

Durnevskaya (Russian: Дурневская) is a rural locality (a village) in Tarnogskoye Rural Settlement, Tarnogsky District, Vologda Oblast, Russia. The population was five, as of 2002.

== Geography ==
Durnevskaya is located 29 km northeast of Tarnogsky Gorodok (the district's administrative centre) by road. Pavlomatveyevskaya is the nearest rural locality.
