= Korotkovskaya, Tarnogsky District, Vologda Oblast =

Korotkovskaya Коротковская
- Village
- Location within Vologda Oblast Location within Russia
- Coordinates: 60°41′N 43°57′E
- Country: Russia
- Region: Vologda Oblast
- District: Tarnogsky District
- Time zone: UTC+3:00

Korotkovskaya (Russian: Коротковская) is a rural locality (a village) in Ilezskoye Rural Settlement, Tarnogsky District, Vologda Oblast, Russia. The population was 30 as of 2002.

== Geography ==
Korotkovskaya is located 37 km northeast of Tarnogsky Gorodok (the district's administrative centre) by road. Okulovskaya is the nearest rural locality.
