= Sinyakovskaya =

Sinyakovskaya Синяковская
- Village
- Location within Vologda Oblast Location within Russia
- Coordinates: 60°38′N 43°18′E
- Country: Russia
- Region: Vologda Oblast
- District: Tarnogsky District
- Time zone: UTC+3:00

Sinyakovskaya (Russian: Синяковская) is a rural locality (a village) in Spasskoye Rural Settlement, Tarnogsky District, Vologda Oblast, Russia. The population was 6 as of 2002.

== Geography ==
By road, Sinyakovskaya is located 30 km northwest of Tarnogsky Gorodok (the district's administrative centre). Pominovskaya is the nearest rural locality.
