= Tyrlyninskaya =

Tyrlyninskaya Тырлынинская
- Village
- Location within Vologda Oblast Location within Russia
- Coordinates: 60°26′N 42°53′E
- Country: Russia
- Region: Vologda Oblast
- District: Tarnogsky District
- Time zone: UTC+3:00

Tyrlyninskaya (Russian: Тырлынинская) is a rural locality (a village) in Verkhovskoye Rural Settlement, Tarnogsky District, Vologda Oblast, Russia. The population was 24 as of 2002.

== Geography ==
Tyrlyninskaya is located 45 km southwest of Tarnogsky Gorodok (the district's administrative centre) by road. Doroninskaya is the nearest rural locality.
