= Stary Dvor, Vologda Oblast =

Stary Dvor Старый Двор
- Village
- Location within Vologda Oblast Location within Russia
- Coordinates: 60°24′N 43°31′E
- Country: Russia
- Region: Vologda Oblast
- District: Tarnogsky District
- Time zone: UTC+3:00

Stary Dvor (Russian: Старый Двор) is a rural locality (a village) in Tarnogskoye Rural Settlement, Tarnogsky District, Vologda Oblast, Russia. The population was 80 as of 2002.

== Geography ==
Stary Dvor is located 17 km southwest of Tarnogsky Gorodok (the district's administrative centre) by road. Yugra is the nearest rural locality.
