= Tyurdinskaya =

Tyurdinskaya Тюрдинская
- Village
- Location within Vologda Oblast Location within Russia
- Coordinates: 60°41′N 43°45′E
- Country: Russia
- Region: Vologda Oblast
- District: Tarnogsky District
- Time zone: UTC+3:00

Tyurdinskaya (Russian: Тюрдинская) is a rural locality (a village) in Tarnogskoye Rural Settlement, Tarnogsky District, Vologda Oblast, Russia. The population was 12 as of 2002.

== Geography ==
Tyurdinskaya is located 33 km northeast of Tarnogsky Gorodok (the district's administrative centre) by road. Borisovskaya is the nearest rural locality.
