= Nikonovskaya, Tarnogsky District, Vologda Oblast =

Nikonovskaya Никоновская
- Village
- Location within Vologda Oblast Location within Russia
- Coordinates: 60°36′N 43°43′E
- Country: Russia
- Region: Vologda Oblast
- District: Tarnogsky District
- Time zone: UTC+3:00

Nikonovskaya (Russian: Никоновская) is a rural locality (a village) in Tarnogskoye Rural Settlement, Tarnogsky District, Vologda Oblast, Russia. The population was 31 as of 2002.

== Geography ==
Nikonovskaya is located 18 km northeast of Tarnogsky Gorodok (the district's administrative centre) by road. Ogudalovo is the nearest rural locality.
