= Yakurino =

Yakurino Якурино
- Village
- Location within Vologda Oblast Location within Russia
- Coordinates: 60°37′N 43°18′E
- Country: Russia
- Region: Vologda Oblast
- District: Tarnogsky District
- Time zone: UTC+3:00

Yakurino (Russian: Якурино) is a rural locality (a village) in Spasskoye Rural Settlement, Tarnogsky District, Vologda Oblast, Russia. The population was 19 as of 2002.

== Geography ==
Yakurino is located 25 km northwest of Tarnogsky Gorodok (the district's administrative centre) by road. Filimonovskaya is the nearest rural locality.
