= Goryayevskaya =

Goryayevskaya Горяевская
- Village
- Location within Vologda Oblast Location within Russia
- Coordinates: 60°30′N 43°14′E
- Country: Russia
- Region: Vologda Oblast
- District: Tarnogsky District
- Time zone: UTC+3:00

Goryayevskaya (Russian: Горяевская) is a rural locality (a village) in Zaborskoye Rural Settlement, Tarnogsky District, Vologda Oblast, Russia. Its population was 69 as of 2002.

== Geography ==
Goryayevskaya is located 22 km west of Tarnogsky Gorodok, the district's administrative centre. Krasnoye is the nearest rural locality.
