= Olikhovskaya =

Olikhovskaya Олиховская
- Village
- Location within Vologda Oblast Location within Russia
- Coordinates: 60°26′N 43°04′E
- Country: Russia
- Region: Vologda Oblast
- District: Tarnogsky District
- Time zone: UTC+3:00

Olikhovskaya (Russian: Олиховская) is a rural locality (a village) in Verkhovskoye Rural Settlement, Tarnogsky District, Vologda Oblast, Russia. The population was 2 as of 2002.

== Geography ==
Olikhovskaya is located 40 km west of Tarnogsky Gorodok (the district's administrative centre) by road. Pershinskaya-2 is the nearest rural locality.
