= Rudnovskaya =

Rudnovskaya Рудновская
- Village
- Location within Vologda Oblast Location within Russia
- Coordinates: 60°27′N 42°58′E
- Country: Russia
- Region: Vologda Oblast
- District: Tarnogsky District
- Time zone: UTC+3:00

Rudnovskaya (Russian: Рудновская) is a rural locality (a village) in Verkhovskoye Rural Settlement, Tarnogsky District, Vologda Oblast, Russia. The population was 44 as of 2002.

== Geography ==
Rudnovskaya is located 39 km west of Tarnogsky Gorodok (the district's administrative centre) by road. Makarovskaya is the nearest rural locality.
