= Pershinskaya-2 =

Pershinskaya-2 Першинская-2
- Village
- Location within Vologda Oblast Location within Russia
- Coordinates: 60°26′N 43°04′E
- Country: Russia
- Region: Vologda Oblast
- District: Tarnogsky District
- Time zone: UTC+3:00

Pershinskaya-2 (Russian: Першинская-2) is a rural locality (a village) in Verkhovskoye Rural Settlement, Tarnogsky District, Vologda Oblast, Russia. The population was 3 as of 2002.

== Geography ==
Pershinskaya-2 is located 40 km west of Tarnogsky Gorodok (the district's administrative centre) by road. Olikhovskaya is the nearest rural locality.
