= Baranskaya =

Baranskaya Баранская
- Village
- Location within Vologda Oblast Location within Russia
- Coordinates: 60°27′N 42°52′E
- Country: Russia
- Region: Vologda Oblast
- District: Tarnogsky District
- Time zone: UTC+3:00

Baranskaya (Russian: Баранская) is a rural locality (a village) in Verkhovskoye Rural Settlement, Tarnogsky District, Vologda Oblast, Russia. The population was 28 as of 2002.

== Geography ==
Baranskaya is located 46 km west of Tarnogsky Gorodok (the district's administrative centre) by road. Naumovskaya is the nearest rural locality.
