= Yelifanovskaya =

Yelifanovskaya Елифановская
- Village
- Location within Vologda Oblast Location within Russia
- Coordinates: 60°41′N 43°53′E
- Country: Russia
- Region: Vologda Oblast
- District: Tarnogsky District
- Time zone: UTC+3:00

Yelifanovskaya (Russian: Елифановская) is a rural locality (a village) in Ilezskoye Rural Settlement, Tarnogsky District, Vologda Oblast, Russia. The population was 27 as of 2002.

== Geography ==
Yelifanovskaya is located 33 km northeast of Tarnogsky Gorodok (the district's administrative centre) by road. Yelifanovskaya Vystavka is the nearest rural locality.
