= Tiunovskaya =

Tiunovskaya Тиуновская
- Village
- Location within Vologda Oblast Location within Russia
- Coordinates: 60°24′N 43°40′E
- Country: Russia
- Region: Vologda Oblast
- District: Tarnogsky District
- Time zone: UTC+3:00

Tiunovskaya (Russian: Тиуновская) is a rural locality (a village) in Tarnogskoye Rural Settlement, Tarnogsky District, Vologda Oblast, Russia. The population was 65 as of 2002.

== Geography ==
Tiunovskaya is located 14 km southeast of Tarnogsky Gorodok (the district's administrative centre) by road. Kokorikha is the nearest rural locality.
