= Romashevsky Pogost =

Romashevsky Pogost Ромашевский Погост
- Selo
- Location within Vologda Oblast Location within Russia
- Coordinates: 60°29′N 43°20′E
- Country: Russia
- Region: Vologda Oblast
- District: Tarnogsky District
- Time zone: UTC+3:00

Romashevsky Pogost (Russian: Ромашевский Погост) is a rural locality (a selo) in Zaborskoye Rural Settlement, Tarnogsky District, Vologda Oblast, Russia. The population was 159 as of 2002. There are 3 streets.

== Geography ==
Romashevsky Pogost is located 17 km west of Tarnogsky Gorodok (the district's administrative centre) by road. Sverchkovskaya is the nearest rural locality.
