= Kokorikha =

Village in Vologda Oblast, Russia

Kokorikha Кокориха
- Village
- Location within Vologda Oblast Location within Russia
- Coordinates: 60°24′N 43°39′E
- Country: Russia
- Region: Vologda Oblast
- District: Tarnogsky District
- Time zone: UTC+3:00

Kokorikha (Russian: Кокориха) is a rural locality (a village) in Tarnogskoye Rural Settlement, Tarnogsky District, Vologda Oblast, Russia. The population was 35 as of 2002.

== Geography ==
Kokorikha is located 13 km southeast of Tarnogsky Gorodok (the district's administrative centre) by road. Malchevskaya is the nearest rural locality.
