= Abbakumovskaya =

Abbakumovskaya Аббакумовская
- Village
- Location within Vologda Oblast Location within Russia
- Coordinates: 60°36′N 43°41′E
- Country: Russia
- Region: Vologda Oblast
- District: Tarnogsky District
- Time zone: [[UTC+3:00]]

Abbakumovskaya (Russian: Аббакумовская) is a rural locality (a village) in Tarnogsky District, Vologda Oblast, Russia. The population was 97 as of 2002.

== Geography ==
Abbakumovskaya is located 15 km (9.3 mi) northeast of Tarnogsky Gorodok (the district's administrative centre) by road. Kirivanovskaya is the nearest rural locality.

== Ethnicity ==
The village is inhabited by Russians and others.
