= Kontorka =

Kontorka Конторка
- Settlement
- Location within Vologda Oblast Location within Russia
- Coordinates: 60°49′N 44°07′E
- Country: Russia
- Region: Vologda Oblast
- District: Tarnogsky District
- Time zone: UTC+3:00

Kontorka (Russian: Конторка) is a rural locality (a settlement) in Ilezskoye Rural Settlement, Tarnogsky District, Vologda Oblast, Russia. The population was 281 as of 2002. There are 6 streets.

== Geography ==
Kontorka is located 58 km northeast of Tarnogsky Gorodok (the district's administrative centre) by road.
