= Sverchkovskaya =

Sverchkovskaya Сверчковская
- Village
- Location within Vologda Oblast Location within Russia
- Coordinates: 60°29′N 43°20′E
- Country: Russia
- Region: Vologda Oblast
- District: Tarnogsky District
- Time zone: UTC+3:00

Sverchkovskaya (Russian: Сверчковская) is a rural locality (a village) in Zaborskoye Rural Settlement, Tarnogsky District, Vologda Oblast, Russia. The population was 53 as of 2002.

== Geography ==
Sverchkovskaya is located 16 km west of Tarnogsky Gorodok (the district's administrative centre) by road. Romashevsky Pogost is the nearest rural locality.
