= Igumnovskaya =

Igumnovskaya Лизина деревня
- Village
- Location within Vologda Oblast Location within Russia
- Coordinates: 60°30′N 43°31′E
- Country: Russia
- Region: Vologda Oblast
- District: Tarnogsky District
- Time zone: UTC+3:00

Igumnovskaya (Russian: Игумновская) is a rural locality (a village) in Tarnogskoye Rural Settlement, Tarnogsky District, Vologda Oblast, Russia. The population was 239 as of 2002. There are 3 streets.

== Geography ==
Igumnovskaya is located 6 km northwest of Tarnogsky Gorodok (the district's administrative centre) by road. Malakhovsky Bor is the nearest rural locality.
