= Pershinskaya-1 =

Pershinskaya-1 Першинская-1
- Village
- Location within Vologda Oblast Location within Russia
- Coordinates: 60°26′N 42°51′E
- Country: Russia
- Region: Vologda Oblast
- District: Tarnogsky District
- Time zone: UTC+3:00

Pershinskaya-1 (Russian: Першинская-1) is a rural locality (a village) in Verkhovskoye Rural Settlement, Tarnogsky District, Vologda Oblast, Russia. The population was 73 as of 2002.

== Geography ==
Pershinskaya-1 is located 47 km west of Tarnogsky Gorodok (the district's administrative centre) by road. Doroninskaya is the nearest rural locality.
