= Samsonovskaya, Tarnogsky District, Vologda Oblast =

Samsonovskaya Самсоновская
- Village
- Location within Vologda Oblast Location within Russia
- Coordinates: 60°26′N 43°16′E
- Country: Russia
- Region: Vologda Oblast
- District: Tarnogsky District
- Time zone: UTC+3:00

Samsonovskaya (Russian: Самсоновская) is a rural locality (a village) in Zaborskoye Rural Settlement, Tarnogsky District, Vologda Oblast, Russia. The population was 40 as of 2002.

== Geography ==
Samsonovskaya is located 23 km southwest of Tarnogsky Gorodok (the district's administrative centre) by road. Ploshilovskaya is the nearest rural locality.
