= Manyukovskaya =

Manyukovskaya Манюковская
- Village
- Location within Vologda Oblast Location within Russia
- Coordinates: 60°37′N 43°41′E
- Country: Russia
- Region: Vologda Oblast
- District: Tarnogsky District
- Time zone: UTC+3:00

Manyukovskaya (Russian: Манюковская) is a rural locality (a village) in Tarnogskoye Rural Settlement, Tarnogsky District, Vologda Oblast, Russia. The population was 30 as of 2002.

== Geography ==
Manyukovskaya is located 17 km northeast of Tarnogsky Gorodok (the district's administrative centre) by road. Mikhaylovskaya is the nearest rural locality.
