= Klenovaya, Tarnogsky District, Vologda Oblast =

Klenovaya Кленовая
- Village
- Location within Vologda Oblast Location within Russia
- Coordinates: 60°15′N 43°45′E
- Country: Russia
- Region: Vologda Oblast
- District: Tarnogsky District
- Time zone: UTC+3:00

Klenovaya (Russian: Кленовая) is a rural locality (a village) in Markushevskoye Rural Settlement, Tarnogsky District, Vologda Oblast, Russia. The population was 93 as of 2002.

== Geography ==
Klenovaya is located 60 km southeast of Tarnogsky Gorodok (the district's administrative centre) by road. Brusenets is the nearest rural locality.
