= Shelovskaya =

Shelovskaya Шеловская
- Village
- Location within Vologda Oblast Location within Russia
- Coordinates: 60°45′N 43°07′E
- Country: Russia
- Region: Vologda Oblast
- District: Tarnogsky District
- Time zone: UTC+3:00

Shelovskaya (Russian: Шеловская) is a rural locality (a village) in Spasskoye Rural Settlement, Tarnogsky District, Vologda Oblast, Russia. The population was 37 as of 2002.

== Geography ==
Shelovskaya is located 46 km northwest of Tarnogsky Gorodok (the district's administrative centre) by road. Vanevskaya is the nearest rural locality.
