= Verigino, Vologda Oblast =

Verigino Веригино
- Village
- Location within Vologda Oblast Location within Russia
- Coordinates: 60°31′N 43°29′E
- Country: Russia
- Region: Vologda Oblast
- District: Tarnogsky District
- Time zone: UTC+3:00

Verigino (Russian: Веригино) is a rural locality (a village) in Tarnogskoye Rural Settlement, Tarnogsky District, Vologda Oblast, Russia. The population was 94 as of 2002.

== Geography ==
Verigino is located 9 km northwest of Tarnogsky Gorodok (the district's administrative centre) by road. Maklinskaya is the nearest rural locality.
