= Nefedovskaya, Tarnogsky District, Vologda Oblast =

Nefedovskaya Нефедовская
- Village
- Location within Vologda Oblast Location within Russia
- Coordinates: 60°37′N 43°41′E
- Country: Russia
- Region: Vologda Oblast
- District: Tarnogsky District
- Time zone: UTC+3:00

Nefedovskaya (Russian: Нефедовская) is a rural locality (a village) in Tarnogskoye Rural Settlement, Tarnogsky District, Vologda Oblast, Russia. The population was 31 as of 2002.

== Geography ==
Nefedovskaya is located 16 km northeast of Tarnogsky Gorodok (the district's administrative centre) by road. Manyukovskaya is the nearest rural locality.
