= Martyanovskaya =

Martyanovskaya Мартьяновская
- Village
- Location within Vologda Oblast Location within Russia
- Coordinates: 60°28′N 42°55′E
- Country: Russia
- Region: Vologda Oblast
- District: Tarnogsky District
- Time zone: UTC+3:00

Martyanovskaya (Russian: Мартьяновская) is a rural locality (a village) in Verkhovskoye Rural Settlement, Tarnogsky District, Vologda Oblast, Russia. The population was 15 as of 2002.

== Geography ==
Martyanovskaya is located 42 km west of Tarnogsky Gorodok (the district's administrative centre) by road. Pavlovskaya is the nearest rural locality.
