= Voroninskaya, Tarnogsky District, Vologda Oblast =

Voroninskaya Воронинская
- Village
- Location within Vologda Oblast Location within Russia
- Coordinates: 60°25′N 43°17′E
- Country: Russia
- Region: Vologda Oblast
- District: Tarnogsky District
- Time zone: UTC+3:00

Voroninskaya (Russian: Воронинская) is a rural locality (a village) in Zaborskoye Rural Settlement, Tarnogsky District, Vologda Oblast, Russia. The population was 7 as of 2002.

== Geography ==
Voroninskaya is located 25 km southwest of Tarnogsky Gorodok (the district's administrative centre) by road. Nikitikha is the nearest rural locality.
