= Kremlevo =

Kremlevo Кремлево
- Village
- Location within Vologda Oblast Location within Russia
- Coordinates: 60°31′N 43°36′E
- Country: Russia
- Region: Vologda Oblast
- District: Tarnogsky District
- Time zone: UTC+3:00

Kremlevo (Russian: Кремлево) is a rural locality (a village) in Tarnogskoye Rural Settlement, Tarnogsky District, Vologda Oblast, Russia. The population was 40 as of 2002. There are 3 streets.

== Geography ==
Kremlevo is located 4 km northeast of Tarnogsky Gorodok (the district's administrative centre) by road. Rylkovskaya is the nearest rural locality.
