= Okatovskaya =

Okatovskaya Окатовская
- Village
- Location within Vologda Oblast Location within Russia
- Coordinates: 60°35′N 43°43′E
- Country: Russia
- Region: Vologda Oblast
- District: Tarnogsky District
- Time zone: UTC+3:00

Okatovskaya (Russian: Окатовская) is a rural locality (a village) in Tarnogskoye Rural Settlement, Tarnogsky District, Vologda Oblast, Russia. The population was 10 as of 2002.

== Geography ==
Okatovskaya is located 18 km northeast of Tarnogsky Gorodok (the district's administrative centre) by road. Nikonovskaya is the nearest rural locality.
