= Kvashninskaya =

Kvashninskaya Квашнинская
- Village
- Location within Vologda Oblast Location within Russia
- Coordinates: 60°29′N 43°06′E
- Country: Russia
- Region: Vologda Oblast
- District: Tarnogsky District
- Time zone: UTC+3:00

Kvashninskaya (Russian: Квашнинская) is a rural locality (a village) in Verkhovskoye Rural Settlement, Tarnogsky District, Vologda Oblast, Russia. The population was 17 as of 2002.

== Geography ==
Kvashninskaya is located 30 km west of Tarnogsky Gorodok (the district's administrative centre) by road. Dubrova is the nearest rural locality.
