= Shershukovskaya =

Shershukovskaya Шершуковская
- Village
- Location within Vologda Oblast Location within Russia
- Coordinates: 60°24′N 43°30′E
- Country: Russia
- Region: Vologda Oblast
- District: Tarnogsky District
- Time zone: UTC+3:00

Shershukovskaya (Russian: Шершуковская) is a rural locality (a village) in Tarnogskoye Rural Settlement, Tarnogsky District, Vologda Oblast, Russia. The population was five as of 2002.

== Geography ==
Shershukovskaya is located 17 km southwest of Tarnogsky Gorodok (the district's administrative centre) by road. Stary Dvor is the nearest rural locality.
