= Yevseyevskaya =

Yevseyevskaya Евсеевская
- Village
- Location within Vologda Oblast Location within Russia
- Coordinates: 60°36′N 43°41′E
- Country: Russia
- Region: Vologda Oblast
- District: Tarnogsky District
- Time zone: UTC+3:00

Yevseyevskaya (Russian: Евсеевская) is a rural locality (a village) in Tarnogskoye Rural Settlement, Tarnogsky District, Vologda Oblast, Russia. The population was 50 as of 2002.

== Geography ==
Yevseyevskaya is located 15 km northeast of Tarnogsky Gorodok (the district's administrative centre) by road. Stepanovskaya is the nearest rural locality.
