= Ilezsky Pogost =

Ilezsky Pogost Илезский Погост
- Selo
- Location within Vologda Oblast Location within Russia
- Coordinates: 60°41′N 43°55′E
- Country: Russia
- Region: Vologda Oblast
- District: Tarnogsky District
- Time zone: UTC+3:00

Ilezsky Pogost (Russian: Илезский Погост) is a rural locality (a selo) and the administrative center of Ilezskoye Rural Settlement, Tarnogsky District, Vologda Oblast, Russia. The population was 115 as of 2002.

== Geography ==
Ilezsky Pogost is located 35 km northeast of Tarnogsky Gorodok (the district's administrative centre) by road. Golchevskaya is the nearest rural locality.
