= Belyayevsky (inhabited locality) =

Belyayevsky (Russian: Беляевский; masculine), Belyayevskaya (Беляевская; feminine), or Belyayevskoye (Беляевское; neuter) is the name of several rural localities in Russia:

- Belyayevsky (rural locality), a khutor in Ryazansky Rural Okrug of Belorechensky District of Krasnodar Krai
- Belyayevskoye, Udmurt Republic, a village in Belyayevsky Selsoviet of Igrinsky District of the Udmurt Republic
- Belyayevskoye, Yaroslavl Oblast, a village in Krutovsky Rural Okrug of Pervomaysky District of Yaroslavl Oblast
- Belyayevskaya, Arkhangelsk Oblast, a village in Chadromsky Selsoviet of Ustyansky District of Arkhangelsk Oblast
- Belyayevskaya, Kirov Oblast, a village in Denisovsky Rural Okrug of Slobodskoy District of Kirov Oblast
- Belyayevskaya, Komi Republic, a village in Obyachevo Selo Administrative Territory of Priluzsky District of the Komi Republic
- Belyayevskaya, Kharovsky District, Vologda Oblast, a village in Shevnitsky Selsoviet of Kharovsky District of Vologda Oblast
- Belyayevskaya, Tarnogsky District, Vologda Oblast, a village in Shebengsky Selsoviet of Tarnogsky District of Vologda Oblast
