= Rykalovskaya =

Rykalovskaya Рыкаловская
- Village
- Location within Vologda Oblast Location within Russia
- Coordinates: 60°41′N 43°08′E
- Country: Russia
- Region: Vologda Oblast
- District: Tarnogsky District
- Time zone: UTC+3:00

Rykalovskaya (Russian: Рыкаловская) is a rural locality (a village) in Spasskoye Rural Settlement, Tarnogsky District, Vologda Oblast, Russia. The population was 2 as of 2002.

== Geography ==
Rykalovskaya is located 36 km northwest of Tarnogsky Gorodok (the district's administrative centre) by road. Gorka is the nearest rural locality.
