= Nizhnepauninskaya =

Nizhnepauninskaya Нижнепаунинская
- Village
- Location within Vologda Oblast Location within Russia
- Coordinates: 60°36′N 43°20′E
- Country: Russia
- Region: Vologda Oblast
- District: Tarnogsky District
- Time zone: UTC+3:00

Nizhnepauninskaya (Russian: Нижнепаунинская) is a rural locality (a village) in Spasskoye Rural Settlement, Tarnogsky District, Vologda Oblast, Russia. The population was 112 as of 2002.

== Geography ==
Nizhnepauninskaya is located 23 km northwest of Tarnogsky Gorodok (the district's administrative centre) by road. Filimonovskaya is the nearest rural locality.
