= Tsybuninskaya =

Tsybuninskaya Цибунинская
- Village
- Location within Vologda Oblast Location within Russia
- Coordinates: 60°26′N 42°54′E
- Country: Russia
- Region: Vologda Oblast
- District: Tarnogsky District
- Time zone: UTC+3:00

Tsybuninskaya (Russian: Цибунинская) is a rural locality (a village) in Verkhovskoye Rural Settlement, Tarnogsky District, Vologda Oblast, Russia. The population was 27 as of 2002.

== Geography ==
Tsybuninskaya is located 45 km southwest of Tarnogsky Gorodok (the district's administrative centre) by road. Patrakeyevskaya is the nearest rural locality.
