= Ayga =

Ayga Айга
- Settlement
- Location within Vologda Oblast Location within Russia
- Coordinates: 60°40′N 43°52′E
- Country: Russia
- Region: Vologda Oblast
- District: Tarnogsky District
- Time zone: UTC+3:00

Ayga (Russian: Айга) is a rural locality (a settlement) in Ilezskoye Rural Settlement, Tarnogsky District, Vologda Oblast, Russia. The population was 304 as of 2002. There are five streets.

== Geography ==
Ayga is located 31 km northeast of Tarnogsky Gorodok (the district's administrative centre) by road. Yelifanovskaya Vystavka is the nearest locality. The settlement was previously named Tayga.
