= Semichayevskaya =

Semichayevskaya Семичаевская
- Village
- Location within Vologda Oblast Location within Russia
- Coordinates: 60°28′N 43°05′E
- Country: Russia
- Region: Vologda Oblast
- District: Tarnogsky District
- Time zone: UTC+3:00

Semichayevskaya (Russian: Семичаевская) is a rural locality (a village) in Verkhovskoye Rural Settlement, Tarnogsky District, Vologda Oblast, Russia. The population was 6 as of 2002.

== Geography ==
Semichayevskaya is located 31 km west of Tarnogsky Gorodok (the district's administrative centre) by road. Kvashninskaya is the nearest rural locality.
