= Vidernikovskaya =

Vidernikovskaya Видерниковская
- Village
- Location within Vologda Oblast Location within Russia
- Coordinates: 60°27′N 43°13′E
- Country: Russia
- Region: Vologda Oblast
- District: Tarnogsky District
- Time zone: UTC+3:00

Vidernikovskaya (Russian: Видерниковская) is a rural locality (a village) in Zaborskoye Rural Settlement, Tarnogsky District, Vologda Oblast, Russia. The population was 6 as of 2002.

== Geography ==
Vidernikovskaya is located 27 km southwest of Tarnogsky Gorodok (the district's administrative centre) by road. Ozhiginskaya is the nearest rural locality.
