= Ovsyannikovskaya, Vologda Oblast =

Ovsyannikovskaya Овсянниковская
- Village
- Location within Vologda Oblast Location within Russia
- Coordinates: 60°42′N 43°05′E
- Country: Russia
- Region: Vologda Oblast
- District: Tarnogsky District
- Time zone: UTC+3:00

Ovsyannikovskaya (Russian: Овсянниковская) is a rural locality (a village) in the Spasskoye Rural Settlement, Tarnogsky District, Vologda Oblast, Russia. The population was 5 as of 2002.

== Geography ==
Ovsyannikovskaya is located 38 km (24 mi) northwest of Tarnogsky Gorodok (the district's administrative centre) by road. Makarovskaya is the nearest rural locality.
