= Akulovskaya, Vologda Oblast =

Akulovskaya Акуловская
- Village
- Location within Vologda Oblast Location within Russia
- Coordinates: 60°38′N 43°13′E
- Country: Russia
- Region: Vologda Oblast
- District: Tarnogsky District
- Time zone: UTC+3:00

Akulovskaya (Russian: Акуловская) is a rural locality (a village) in Spasskoye Rural Settlement, Tarnogsky District, Vologda Oblast, Russia. The population was 19 as of 2002.

== Geography ==
Akulovskaya is located 28 km (17 mi) northwest of Tarnogsky Gorodok (the district's administrative centre) by road. Borok is the nearest rural locality.
