= Denisovskaya, Tarnogsky District, Vologda Oblast =

Denisovskaya Денисовская
- Village
- Location within Vologda Oblast Location within Russia
- Coordinates: 60°37′N 43°14′E
- Country: Russia
- Region: Vologda Oblast
- District: Tarnogsky District
- Time zone: UTC+3:00

Denisovskaya (Russian: Денисовская) is a rural locality (a village) in Spasskoye Rural Settlement, Tarnogsky District, Vologda Oblast, Russia. The population was 108 as of 2002.

== Geography ==
Denisovskaya is located 27 km northwest of Tarnogsky Gorodok (the district's administrative centre) by road. Krivosheinskaya is the nearest rural locality.
