= Patrakeyevskaya, Tarnogsky District, Vologda Oblast =

Patrakeyevskaya Патракеевская
- Village
- Location within Vologda Oblast Location within Russia
- Coordinates: 60°27′N 42°54′E
- Country: Russia
- Region: Vologda Oblast
- District: Tarnogsky District
- Time zone: UTC+3:00

Patrakeyevskaya (Russian: Патракеевская) is a rural locality (a village) in Verkhovskoye Rural Settlement, Tarnogsky District, Vologda Oblast, Russia. The population was 35 as of 2002.

== Geography ==
Patrakeyevskaya is located 44 km west of Tarnogsky Gorodok (the district's administrative centre) by road. Burtsevskaya is the nearest rural locality.
