= Maklinskaya =

Maklinskaya Маклинская
- Village
- Location within Vologda Oblast Location within Russia
- Coordinates: 60°31′N 43°28′E
- Country: Russia
- Region: Vologda Oblast
- District: Tarnogsky District
- Time zone: UTC+3:00

Maklinskaya (Russian: Маклинская) is a rural locality (a village) in Tarnogskoye Rural Settlement, Tarnogsky District, Vologda Oblast, Russia. The population was 54 as of 2002. There are 3 streets.

== Geography ==
Maklinskaya is located 8 km northwest of Tarnogsky Gorodok (the district's administrative centre) by road. Verigino is the nearest rural locality.
