= Ostashevskaya, Tarnogsky District, Vologda Oblast =

Ostashevskaya Осташевская
- Village
- Location within Vologda Oblast Location within Russia
- Coordinates: 60°28′N 42°56′E
- Country: Russia
- Region: Vologda Oblast
- District: Tarnogsky District
- Time zone: UTC+3:00

Ostashevskaya (Russian: Осташевская) is a rural locality (a village) in Verkhovskoye Rural Settlement, Tarnogsky District, Vologda Oblast, Russia. The population was 12 as of 2002.

== Geography ==
Ostashevskaya is located 42 km west of Tarnogsky Gorodok (the district's administrative centre) by road. Anosovskaya is the nearest rural locality.
