= Pershinskaya, Vologda Oblast =

Pershinskaya Першинская
- Village
- Location within Vologda Oblast Location within Russia
- Coordinates: 60°31′N 43°23′E
- Country: Russia
- Region: Vologda Oblast
- District: Tarnogsky District
- Time zone: UTC+3:00

Pershinskaya (Russian: Першинская) is a rural locality (a village) in Tarnogskoye Rural Settlement, Tarnogsky District, Vologda Oblast, Russia. The population was 3 as of 2002.

== Geography ==
Pershinskaya is located 14 km northwest of Tarnogsky Gorodok (the district's administrative centre) by road. Kurkovskaya is the nearest rural locality.
