= Budrinskaya-1 =

Budrinskaya-1 Будринская-1
- Village
- Location within Vologda Oblast Location within Russia
- Coordinates: 60°26′N 42°59′E
- Country: Russia
- Region: Vologda Oblast
- District: Tarnogsky District
- Time zone: UTC+3:00

Budrinskaya-1 (Russian: Будринская-1) is a rural locality (a village) in Verkhovskoye Rural Settlement, Tarnogsky District, Vologda Oblast, Russia. The population was 6 as of 2002.

== Geography ==
Budrinskaya-1 is located 39 km west of Tarnogsky Gorodok (the district's administrative centre) by road. Kuzminskaya is the nearest rural locality.
