= Verkhnepauninskaya =

Verkhnepauninskaya Верхнепаунинская
- Village
- Location within Vologda Oblast Location within Russia
- Coordinates: 60°35′N 43°20′E
- Country: Russia
- Region: Vologda Oblast
- District: Tarnogsky District
- Time zone: UTC+3:00

Verkhnepauninskaya (Russian: Верхнепаунинская) is a rural locality (a village) in Spasskoye Rural Settlement, Tarnogsky District, Vologda Oblast, Russia. The population was 24 as of 2002.

== Geography ==
Verkhnepauninskaya is located 20 km northwest of Tarnogsky Gorodok (the district's administrative centre) by road. Gavrilovskaya is the nearest rural locality.
