= Ananyevskaya, Tarnogsky District, Vologda Oblast =

Ananyevskaya Ананьевская
- Village
- Location within Vologda Oblast Location within Russia
- Coordinates: 60°41′N 43°06′E
- Country: Russia
- Region: Vologda Oblast
- District: Tarnogsky District
- Time zone: UTC+3:00

Ananyevskaya (Russian: Ананьевская) is a rural locality (a village) in Spasskoye Rural Settlement, Tarnogsky District, Vologda Oblast, Russia. The population was 3 as of 2002.

== Geography ==
Ananyevskaya is located 37 kilometres (23 mi) northwest of Tarnogsky Gorodok (the district's administrative centre) by road. Naumovskaya is the nearest rural locality.
