= Regishevskaya =

Regishevskaya Регишевская
- Village
- Location within Vologda Oblast Location within Russia
- Coordinates: 60°28′N 43°22′E
- Country: Russia
- Region: Vologda Oblast
- District: Tarnogsky District
- Time zone: UTC+3:00

Regishevskaya (Russian: Регишевская) is a rural locality (a village) in Zaborskoye Rural Settlement, Tarnogsky District, Vologda Oblast, Russia. The population was 69 as of 2002.

== Geography ==
Regishevskaya is located 17 km southwest of Tarnogsky Gorodok (the district's administrative centre) by road. Petryayevskaya is the nearest rural locality.
