= Lukinskaya, Tarnogsky District, Vologda Oblast =

Lukinskaya Лукинская
- Village
- Location within Vologda Oblast Location within Russia
- Coordinates: 60°31′N 43°36′E
- Country: Russia
- Region: Vologda Oblast
- District: Tarnogsky District
- Time zone: UTC+3:00

Lukinskaya (Russian: Лукинская) is a rural locality (a village) in Tarnogskoye Rural Settlement, Tarnogsky District, Vologda Oblast, Russia. The population was 23 as of 2002.

== Geography ==
Lukinskaya is located 10 km northeast of Tarnogsky Gorodok (the district's administrative centre) by road. Rylkovskaya is the nearest rural locality.
