= Volodinskaya =

Volodinskaya Володинская
- Village
- Location within Vologda Oblast Location within Russia
- Coordinates: 60°40′N 43°48′E
- Country: Russia
- Region: Vologda Oblast
- District: Tarnogsky District
- Time zone: UTC+3:00

Volodinskaya (Russian: Володинская) is a rural locality (a village) in Tarnogskoye Rural Settlement, Tarnogsky District, Vologda Oblast, Russia. The population was 37 as of 2002.

== Geography ==
Volodinskaya is located 27 km northeast of Tarnogsky Gorodok (the district's administrative centre) by road. Verkhnekokshengsky Pogost is the nearest rural locality.
