= Gusikha, Vologda Oblast =

Gusikha Гусиха
- Village
- Location within Vologda Oblast Location within Russia
- Coordinates: 60°30′N 43°08′E
- Country: Russia
- Region: Vologda Oblast
- District: Tarnogsky District
- Time zone: UTC+3:00

Gusikha (Russian: Гусиха) is a rural locality (a village) in Zaborskoye Rural Settlement, Tarnogsky District, Vologda Oblast, Russia. The population was 50 as of 2002.

== Geography ==
Gusikha is located 28 km west of Tarnogsky Gorodok (the district's administrative centre) by road. Kurevino is the nearest rural locality.
