= Timoshinskaya, Tarnogsky District, Vologda Oblast =

Timoshinskaya Тимошинская
- Village
- Location within Vologda Oblast Location within Russia
- Coordinates: 60°31′N 43°33′E
- Country: Russia
- Region: Vologda Oblast
- District: Tarnogsky District
- Time zone: UTC+3:00

Timoshinskaya (Russian: Тимошинская) is a rural locality (a village) in Tarnogskoye Rural Settlement, Tarnogsky District, Vologda Oblast, Russia. The population was 46 as of 2002. There are 2 streets.

== Geography ==
Timoshinskaya is located 3 km northwest of Tarnogsky Gorodok (the district's administrative centre) by road. Tarnogsky Gorodok is the nearest rural locality.
