= Cherepanikha, Tarnogsky District, Vologda Oblast =

Cherepanikha Черепаниха
- Village
- Location within Vologda Oblast Location within Russia
- Coordinates: 60°27′N 43°50′E
- Country: Russia
- Region: Vologda Oblast
- District: Tarnogsky District
- Time zone: UTC+3:00

Cherepanikha (Russian: Черепаниха) is a rural locality (a village) in Markushevskoye Rural Settlement, Tarnogsky District, Vologda Oblast, Russia. The population was 16 as of 2002.

== Geography ==
Cherepanikha is located 24 km southeast of Tarnogsky Gorodok (the district's administrative centre) by road. Kriulya is the nearest rural locality.
