= Afonovskaya =

Afonovskaya Афоновская
- Village
- Location within Vologda Oblast Location within Russia
- Coordinates: 60°25′N 43°37′E
- Country: Russia
- Region: Vologda Oblast
- District: Tarnogsky District
- Time zone: UTC+3:00

Afonovskaya (Russian: Афоновская) is a rural locality (a village) in Tarnogskoye Rural Settlement, Tarnogsky District, Vologda Oblast, Russia. The population was 147 as of 2002. There are 2 streets.

== Geography ==
Afonovskaya is located 10 km (6.2 mi) southeast of Tarnogsky Gorodok (the district's administrative centre) by road. Bovytinskaya is the nearest rural locality.
