= Yelifanovskaya Vystavka =

Yelifanovskaya Vystavka Елифановская Выставка
- Village
- Location within Vologda Oblast Location within Russia
- Coordinates: 60°40′N 43°53′E
- Country: Russia
- Region: Vologda Oblast
- District: Tarnogsky District
- Time zone: UTC+3:00

Yelifanovskaya Vystavka (Russian: Елифановская Выставка) is a rural locality (a village) in Ilezskoye Rural Settlement, Tarnogsky District, Vologda Oblast, Russia. The population was 8 as of 2002.

== Geography ==
Yelifanovskaya Vystavka is located 33 km northeast of Tarnogsky Gorodok (the district's administrative centre) by road. Yelifanovskaya is the nearest rural locality.
