= Doroninskaya, Tarnogsky District, Vologda Oblast =

Doroninskaya Доронинская
- Village
- Location within Vologda Oblast Location within Russia
- Coordinates: 60°26′N 42°52′E
- Country: Russia
- Region: Vologda Oblast
- District: Tarnogsky District
- Time zone: UTC+3:00

Doroninskaya (Russian: Доронинская) is a rural locality (a village) in Verkhovskoye Rural Settlement, Tarnogsky District, Vologda Oblast, Russia. The population was 45 as of 2002.

== Geography ==
Doroninskaya is located 46 km west of Tarnogsky Gorodok (the district's administrative centre) by road. Tyrlyninskaya is the nearest rural locality.
