= Stepushino =

Stepushino Степушино
- Village
- Location within Vologda Oblast Location within Russia
- Coordinates: 60°43′N 43°54′E
- Country: Russia
- Region: Vologda Oblast
- District: Tarnogsky District
- Time zone: UTC+3:00

Stepushino (Russian: Степушино) is a rural locality (a village) in Ilezskoye Rural Settlement, Tarnogsky District, Vologda Oblast, Russia. The population was 6 as of 2002.

== Geography ==
Stepushino is located 40 km northeast of Tarnogsky Gorodok (the district's administrative centre) by road. Yermakovskaya is the nearest rural locality.
