= Spassky Pogost =

Spassky Pogost Спасский Погост
- Selo
- Location within Vologda Oblast Location within Russia
- Coordinates: 60°39′N 43°12′E
- Country: Russia
- Region: Vologda Oblast
- District: Tarnogsky District
- Time zone: UTC+3:00

Spassky Pogost (Russian: Спасский Погост) is a rural locality (a selo) in Spasskoye Rural Settlement, Tarnogsky District, Vologda Oblast, Russia. The population was 225 as of 2002.

== Geography ==
Spassky Pogost is located 33 km northwest of Tarnogsky Gorodok (the district's administrative centre) by road. Nikiforovskaya is the nearest rural locality.
