= Yafanovskaya =

Yafanovskaya Яфановская
- Village
- Location within Vologda Oblast Location within Russia
- Coordinates: 60°41′N 43°55′E
- Country: Russia
- Region: Vologda Oblast
- District: Tarnogsky District
- Time zone: UTC+3:00

Yafanovskaya (Russian: Яфановская) is a rural locality (a village) in Verkhovskoye Rural Settlement, Tarnogsky District, Vologda Oblast, Russia. The population was 12 as of 2002.

== Geography ==
Yafanovskaya is located 38 km southwest of Tarnogsky Gorodok (the district's administrative centre) by road. Davydovskaya is the nearest rural locality.
