= Ozhiginskaya, Tarnogsky District, Vologda Oblast =

Ozhiginskaya Ожигинская
- Village
- Location within Vologda Oblast Location within Russia
- Coordinates: 60°27′N 43°14′E
- Country: Russia
- Region: Vologda Oblast
- District: Tarnogsky District
- Time zone: UTC+3:00

Ozhiginskaya (Russian: Ожигинская) is a rural locality (a village) in Zaborskoye Rural Settlement, Tarnogsky District, Vologda Oblast, Russia. The population was 1 as of 2002.

== Geography ==
Ozhiginskaya is located 27 km southwest of Tarnogsky Gorodok (the district's administrative centre) by road. Vidernikovskaya is the nearest rural locality.
