= Pospelovskaya =

Pospelovskaya Поспеловская
- Village
- Location within Vologda Oblast Location within Russia
- Coordinates: 60°30′N 43°20′E
- Country: Russia
- Region: Vologda Oblast
- District: Tarnogsky District
- Time zone: UTC+3:00

Pospelovskaya (Russian: Поспеловская) is a rural locality (a village) in Zaborskoye Rural Settlement, Tarnogsky District, Vologda Oblast, Russia. The population was 44 as of 2002.

== Geography ==
Pospelovskaya is located 17 km west of Tarnogsky Gorodok (the district's administrative centre) by road. Romashevsky Pogost is the nearest rural locality.
