= Grigoryevskaya, Tarnogsky District, Vologda Oblast =

Grigoryevskaya Григорьевская
- Village
- Location within Vologda Oblast Location within Russia
- Coordinates: 60°39′N 43°20′E
- Country: Russia
- Region: Vologda Oblast
- District: Tarnogsky District
- Time zone: UTC+3:00

Grigoryevskaya (Russian: Григорьевская) is a rural locality (a village) in Spasskoye Rural Settlement, Tarnogsky District, Vologda Oblast, Russia. The population was 14 as of 2002.

== Geography ==
Grigoryevskaya is located 28 km northwest of Tarnogsky Gorodok (the district's administrative centre) by road. Dementyevskaya is the nearest rural locality.
