= Yakinskaya =

Yakinskaya Якинская
- Village
- Location within Vologda Oblast Location within Russia
- Coordinates: 60°42′N 43°55′E
- Country: Russia
- Region: Vologda Oblast
- District: Tarnogsky District
- Time zone: UTC+3:00

Yakinskaya (Russian: Якинская) is a rural locality (a village) in Ilezskoye Rural Settlement, Tarnogsky District, Vologda Oblast, Russia. The population was 12 as of 2002.

== Geography ==
Yakinskaya is located 38 km northeast of Tarnogsky Gorodok (the district's administrative centre) by road. Karchevskaya is the nearest rural locality.
