= Boyarskaya, Tarnogsky District, Vologda Oblast =

Boyarskaya Боярская
- Village
- Location within Vologda Oblast Location within Russia
- Coordinates: 60°29′N 43°11′E
- Country: Russia
- Region: Vologda Oblast
- District: Tarnogsky District
- Time zone: UTC+3:00

Boyarskaya (Russian: Боярская) is a rural locality (a village) in Zaborskoye Rural Settlement, Tarnogsky District, Vologda Oblast, Russia. The population was 6 as of 2002.

== Geography ==
Boyarskaya is located 25 km west of Tarnogsky Gorodok (the district's administrative centre) by road. Katerinino is the nearest rural locality.
