= Klevtsovskaya =

Klevtsovskaya Клевцовская
- Village
- Location within Vologda Oblast Location within Russia
- Coordinates: 60°23′N 43°19′E
- Country: Russia
- Region: Vologda Oblast
- District: Tarnogsky District
- Time zone: UTC+3:00

Klevtsovskaya (Russian: Клевцовская) is a rural locality (a village) in Zaborskoye Rural Settlement, Tarnogsky District, Vologda Oblast, Russia. The population was 19 as of 2002.

== Geography ==
Klevtsovskaya is located 28 km southwest of Tarnogsky Gorodok (the district's administrative centre) by road. Alferovskaya is the nearest rural locality.
