= Chernyatinskaya =

Chernyatinskaya Чернятинская
- Village
- Location within Vologda Oblast Location within Russia
- Coordinates: 60°27′N 43°00′E
- Country: Russia
- Region: Vologda Oblast
- District: Tarnogsky District
- Time zone: UTC+3:00

Chernyatinskaya (Russian: Чернятинская) is a rural locality (a village) in Verkhovskoye Rural Settlement, Tarnogsky District, Vologda Oblast, Russia. The population was 4 as of 2002.

== Geography ==
Chernyatinskaya is located 37 km southwest of Tarnogsky Gorodok (the district's administrative centre) by road. Vlasyevskaya is the nearest rural locality.
