= Semenovskaya, Tarnogsky District, Vologda Oblast =

Semenovskaya Семеновская
- Village
- Location within Vologda Oblast Location within Russia
- Coordinates: 60°29′N 43°44′E
- Country: Russia
- Region: Vologda Oblast
- District: Tarnogsky District
- Time zone: UTC+3:00

Semenovskaya (Russian: Семеновская) is a rural locality (a village) in Zaborskoye Rural Settlement, Tarnogsky District, Vologda Oblast, Russia. The population was 49 as of 2002.

== Geography ==
Semenovskaya is located 10 km southeast of Tarnogsky Gorodok (the district's administrative centre) by road. Pavlovskaya is the nearest rural locality.
