= Prokopyevsky =

Prokopyevsky (masculine), Prokopyevskaya (feminine), or Prokopyevskoye (neuter) may refer to:

- Prokopyevsky District, a district of Kemerovo Oblast, Russia
- Prokopyevsky Urban Okrug, a municipal formation in Kemerovo Oblast, which the city of Prokopyevsk is incorporated as
- Prokopyevsky (rural locality) (Prokopyevskaya, Prokopyevskoye), name of several rural localities in Russia
