= Ramenye, Tarnogsky District, Vologda Oblast =

Ramenye Раменье
- Village
- Location within Vologda Oblast Location within Russia
- Coordinates: 60°16′N 43°46′E
- Country: Russia
- Region: Vologda Oblast
- District: Tarnogsky District
- Time zone: UTC+3:00

Ramenye (Russian: Раменье) is a rural locality (a village) in Markushevskoye Rural Settlement, Tarnogsky District, Vologda Oblast, Russia. The population was 55 as of 2002.

== Geography ==
Ramenye is located 59 km southeast of Tarnogsky Gorodok (the district's administrative centre) by road. Klenovaya is the nearest locality. etymology
