= Prokopyevsky (rural locality) =

Prokopyevsky (Russian: Проко́пьевский; masculine), Prokopyevskaya (Проко́пьевская; feminine), or Prokopyevskoye (Проко́пьевское; neuter) is the name of several rural localities in Russia:

- Prokopyevskoye, a selo in Gostovsky Rural Okrug of Shabalinsky District of Kirov Oblast
- Prokopyevskaya, Kirov Oblast, a village in Ichetovkinsky Rural Okrug of Afanasyevsky District of Kirov Oblast
- Prokopyevskaya, Vologda Oblast, a village in Shebengsky Selsoviet of Tarnogsky District of Vologda Oblast
