= Belyayevsky =

Belyayevsky (masculine), Belyayevskaya (feminine), or Belyayevskoye (neuter) may refer to:

- Belyayevsky District, a district of Orenburg Oblast, Russia
- Belyayevsky (inhabited locality) (Belyayevskaya, Belyayevskoye), name of several rural localities in Russia
