= Sluda, Tarnogsky District, Vologda Oblast =

Sluda Слуда
- Village
- Location within Vologda Oblast Location within Russia
- Coordinates: 60°32′N 43°37′E
- Country: Russia
- Region: Vologda Oblast
- District: Tarnogsky District
- Time zone: UTC+3:00

Sluda (Russian: Слуда) is a rural locality (a village) in Tarnogskoye Rural Settlement, Tarnogsky District, Vologda Oblast, Russia. The population was 316 as of 2002. There are five streets.

== Geography ==
Sluda is located 6 km northeast of Tarnogsky Gorodok (the district's administrative centre) by road. Mikheyevskaya is the nearest rural locality.
