= Krasnoye, Tarnogsky District, Vologda Oblast =

Krasnoye Красное
- Selo
- Location within Vologda Oblast Location within Russia
- Coordinates: 60°30′N 43°13′E
- Country: Russia
- Region: Vologda Oblast
- District: Tarnogsky District
- Time zone: UTC+3:00

Krasnoye (Russian: Красное) is a rural locality (a selo) and the administrative center of Zaborskoye Rural Settlement, Tarnogsky District, Vologda Oblast, Russia. The population was 457 as of 2002. There are 6 streets.

== Geography ==
Krasnoye is located 23 km west of Tarnogsky Gorodok (the district's administrative centre) by road. Goryayevskaya is the nearest rural locality.
