= Sergiyevsky =

Sergiyevsky (masculine), Sergiyevskaya (feminine), or Sergiyevskoye (neuter) may refer to:

- Sergiyevsky District, a district of Samara Oblast, Russia
- Sergiyevskoye Municipal Okrug, a municipal okrug of Vyborgsky District of the federal city of St. Petersburg, Russia
- Sergiyevsky (rural locality) (Sergiyevskaya, Sergiyevskoye), several rural localities in Russia
- Anatoly Sergievsky, major character in Chess the Musical
