= Prokopyevskaya, Vologda Oblast =

Prokopyevskaya Прокопьевская
- Village
- Location within Vologda Oblast Location within Russia
- Coordinates: 60°25′04″N 43°35′13″E
- Country: Russia
- Region: Vologda Oblast
- District: Tarnogsky District
- Time zone: UTC+3:00

Prokopyevskaya (Russian: Прокопьевская) is a rural locality (a village) in Tarnogskoye Rural Settlement, Tarnogsky District, Vologda Oblast, Russia. The population was 11 as of 2002.

== Geography ==
Prokopyevskaya is located 12 km south of Tarnogsky Gorodok (the district's administrative centre) by road. Kuznetsovskaya is the nearest rural locality.
