= Sergiyevskaya, Vologda Oblast =

Sergiyevskaya Сергиевская
- Village
- Location within Vologda Oblast Location within Russia
- Coordinates: 60°14′N 43°56′E
- Country: Russia
- Region: Vologda Oblast
- District: Tarnogsky District
- Time zone: UTC+3:00

Sergiyevskaya (Russian: Сергиевская) is a rural locality (a village) in Markushevskoye Rural Settlement, Tarnogsky District, Vologda Oblast, Russia. The population was 143 as of 2002.

== Geography ==
Sergiyevskaya is located 51 km southeast of Tarnogsky Gorodok (the district's administrative centre) by road. Brusenets is the nearest rural locality.
