= Tarnogsky Gorodok Airfield =

Tarnogsky Gorodok
- IATA: none; ICAO: none

Summary
- Airport type: Public
- Location: Tarnogskiy Gorodok
- Elevation AMSL: 328 ft / 100 m
- Coordinates: 60°30′12″N 43°36′6″E
- Interactive map of Tarnogsky Gorodok

Runways
Direction	Length		Surface
Direction	ft	m	Surface
10/28	4,593	1,400	Asphalt

Tarnogsky Gorodok is an aerodrome in Russia located 2 km northeast of the selo of Tarnogsky Gorodok, the center of Tarnogsky District in Vologda Oblast. It is a small civilian airfield, with small parking apron. The aerodrome is defunct, but as of 2024 still keeps its mention in official doc, with the local reference УЛВГ - transliterating to ULWG.

== See also ==
- List of airports in Russia
