= Sergiyevskaya, Volgograd Oblast =

Sergiyevskaya Сергиевская
- Stanitsa
- Location within Volgograd Oblast Location within Russia
- Coordinates: 50°14′N 43°47′E
- Country: Russia
- Region: Volgograd Oblast
- District: Danilovsky District
- Time zone: UTC+4:00

Sergiyevskaya (Russian: Сергиевская) is a rural locality (a stanitsa) and the administrative center of Sergiyevskoye Rural Settlement, Danilovsky District, Volgograd Oblast, Russia. The population was 1,052 as of 2010. There are 16 streets.

== Geography ==
Sergiyevskaya is located in forest steppe, on the right bank of the Medveditsa River, 40 km southwest of Danilovka (the district's administrative centre) by road. Zapolyansky is the nearest rural locality.
