= Ramenye, Gryazovetsky District, Vologda Oblast =

Ramenye Раменье
- Village
- Location within Vologda Oblast Location within Russia
- Coordinates: 58°46′N 40°51′E
- Country: Russia
- Region: Vologda Oblast
- District: Gryazovetsky District
- Time zone: UTC+3:00

Ramenye (Russian: Раменье) is a rural locality (a village) in Pertsevskoye Rural Settlement, Gryazovetsky District, Vologda Oblast, Russia. The population was 15 as of 2002.

== Geography ==
Ramenye is located 42 km southeast of Gryazovets (the district's administrative centre) by road. Levino is the nearest locality.
