= Sergiyevsky, Voronezh Oblast =

Sergiyevsky Сергиевский
- Khutor
- Location within Voronezh Oblast Location within Russia
- Coordinates: 51°11′N 40°44′E
- Country: Russia
- Region: Voronezh Oblast
- District: Talovsky District
- Time zone: UTC+3:00

Sergiyevsky (Russian: Сергиевский) is a rural locality (a khutor) in Alexandrovskoye Rural Settlement, Talovsky District, Voronezh Oblast, Russia. The population was 81 as of 2010. There are 4 streets.

== Geography ==
Sergiyevsky is located 15 km north of Talovaya (the district's administrative centre) by road. Novotroitsky is the nearest rural locality.
