= Sluda, Nikolsky District, Vologda Oblast =

Sluda Слуда
- Village
- Location within Vologda Oblast Location within Russia
- Coordinates: 59°52′N 44°58′E
- Country: Russia
- Region: Vologda Oblast
- District: Nikolsky District
- Time zone: UTC+3:00

Sluda (Russian: Слуда) is a rural locality (a village) in Zelentsovskoye Rural Settlement, Nikolsky District, Vologda Oblast, Russia. The population was 81 as of 2002.

== Geography ==
Sluda is located 56 km northwest of Nikolsk (the district's administrative centre) by road. Zelentsovo is the nearest rural locality.
