= Ramenye, Kichmengsko-Gorodetsky District, Vologda Oblast =

Ramenye Раменье
- Village
- Location within Vologda Oblast Location within Russia
- Coordinates: 59°59′N 45°45′E
- Country: Russia
- Region: Vologda Oblast
- District: Kichmengsko-Gorodetsky District
- Time zone: UTC+3:00

Ramenye (Russian: Раменье) is a rural locality (a village) in Gorodetskoye Rural Settlement, Kichmengsko-Gorodetsky District, Vologda Oblast, Russia. The population was 77 as of 2002. There are 2 streets.

== Geography ==
Ramenye is located 4 km west of Kichmengsky Gorodok (the district's administrative centre) by road. Ushakovo is the nearest rural locality. ramen` shoulder in slavic languages
