= Ramenye, Vyaznikovsky District, Vladimir Oblast =

Ramenye Раменье
- Village
- Location within Vladimir Oblast Location within Russia
- Coordinates: 56°20′N 41°54′E
- Country: Russia
- Region: Vladimir Oblast
- District: Vyaznikovsky District
- Time zone: UTC+3:00

Ramenye (Russian: Раменье) is a rural locality (a village) in Mstyora Urban Settlement, Vyaznikovsky District, Vladimir Oblast, Russia. The population was 119 as of 2010. There are 2 streets.

== Geography ==
Ramenye is located 25 km northwest of Vyazniki (the district's administrative centre) by road. Chernomorye is the nearest rural locality.
