= Ramenye, Sheksninsky District, Vologda Oblast =

Ramenye Раменье
- Village
- Location within Vologda Oblast Location within Russia
- Coordinates: 59°29′N 38°29′E
- Country: Russia
- Region: Vologda Oblast
- District: Sheksninsky District
- Time zone: UTC+3:00

Ramenye (Russian: Раменье) is a rural locality (a village) in Ramenskoye Rural Settlement, Sheksninsky District, Vologda Oblast, Russia. The population was 33 as of 2002.

== Geography ==
Ramenye is located 43 km north of Sheksna (the district's administrative centre) by road. Aristovo is the nearest rural locality. ramen` shoulder in slavic languages
