= Sergiyevskoye, Ivanovo Oblast =

Sergiyevskoye Сергиевское
- Village
- Location within Ivanovo Oblast Location within Russia
- Coordinates: 57°03′N 41°03′E
- Country: Russia
- Region: Ivanovo Oblast
- District: Ivanovsky District
- Time zone: UTC+3:00

Sergiyevskoye (Russian: Сергиевское) is a rural locality (a village) in Ivanovsky District, Ivanovo Oblast, Russia. Population: 16 (2010 census);

== Geography ==
This rural locality is located 9 kilometres (5.6 mi) from Ivanovo (the district's administrative centre and capital of Ivanovo Oblast) and 253 kilometres (157 mi) from Moscow. Byakovo is the nearest rural locality.
