= Sluda, Totemsky District, Vologda Oblast =

Rural locality in Totemsky District, Vologda Oblast, Russia

Coordinates: 60°00′28″N 42°59′27″E

Sluda (Russian: Слуда) is a rural locality (a village) in Totemsky District of Vologda Oblast, Russia. Population: 9 (2002).
