= Ramenye, Suzdalsky District, Vladimir Oblast =

Ramenye Раменье
- Village
- Location within Vladimir Oblast Location within Russia
- Coordinates: 56°17′N 40°35′E
- Country: Russia
- Region: Vladimir Oblast
- District: Suzdalsky District
- Time zone: UTC+3:00

Ramenye (Russian: Раменье) is a rural locality (a village) in Bogolyubovskoye Rural Settlement, Suzdalsky District, Vladimir Oblast, Russia. The population was 174 as of 2010. There are 7 streets.

== Geography ==
Ramenye is located on the Nerl River, 47 km southeast of Suzdal (the district's administrative centre) by road. Baskaki is the nearest locality.
