= Tarnogsky Gorodok =

Tarnogsky Gorodok Тарногский Городок
- Selo
- Interactive map of Tarnogsky Gorodok
- Location of Tarnogsky Gorodok Tarnogsky Gorodok (Vologda Oblast)
- Coordinates: 60°30′N 43°33′E
- Country: Russia
- Federal subject: Vologda Oblast
- Administrative district: Tarnogsky District
- Selsoviet: Tarnogsky Selsoviet
- Founded: 1453

Population (2010 Census)
  - Total: 5,368
  - Estimate (2021): 4,927 (−8.2%)

Administrative status
  - Capital of: Tarnogsky District, Tarnogsky Selsoviet

Municipal status
  - Municipal district: Tarnogsky Municipal District
  - Rural settlement: Tarnogskoye Rural Settlement
  - Capital of: Tarnogsky Municipal District, Tarnogskoye Rural Settlement
- Time zone: UTC+3 (MSK)
- Postal code: 161560
- OKTMO ID: 19642442101

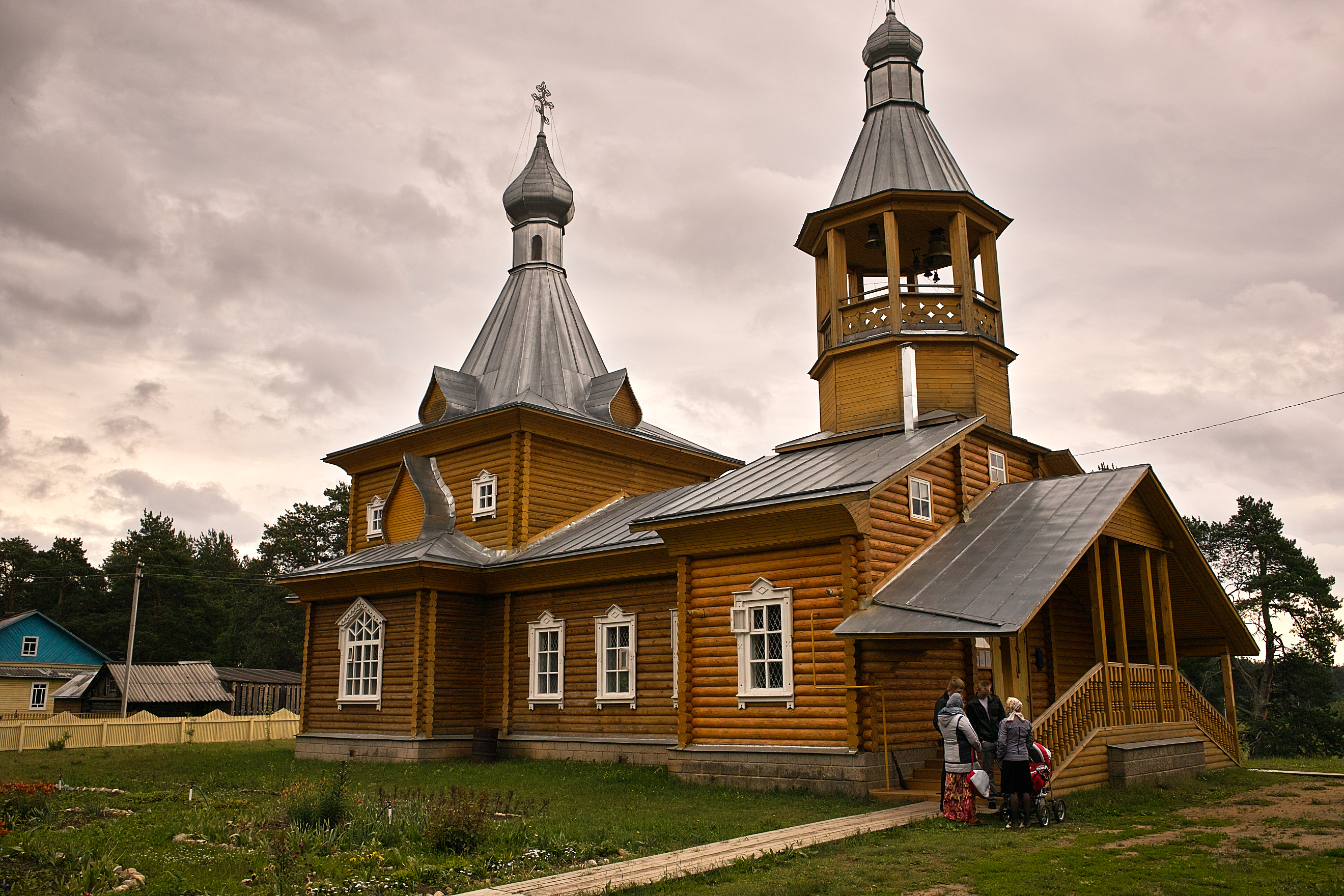
The church of Tarnoga

Tarnogsky Gorodok (Russian: Тарногский Городок) is a rural locality (a selo) and the administrative center of Tarnogsky District of Vologda Oblast, Russia, located on the left bank of the Kokshenga River, at its confluence with the Tarnoga River. It also serves as the administrative center of Tarnogsky Selsoviet, one of the thirteen selsoviets into which the district is administratively divided. Municipally, it is the administrative center of Tarnogskoye Rural Settlement. Population: 5,368 (2010 census); 5,539 (2002 census); 5,570 (1989 Soviet census).

== History ==
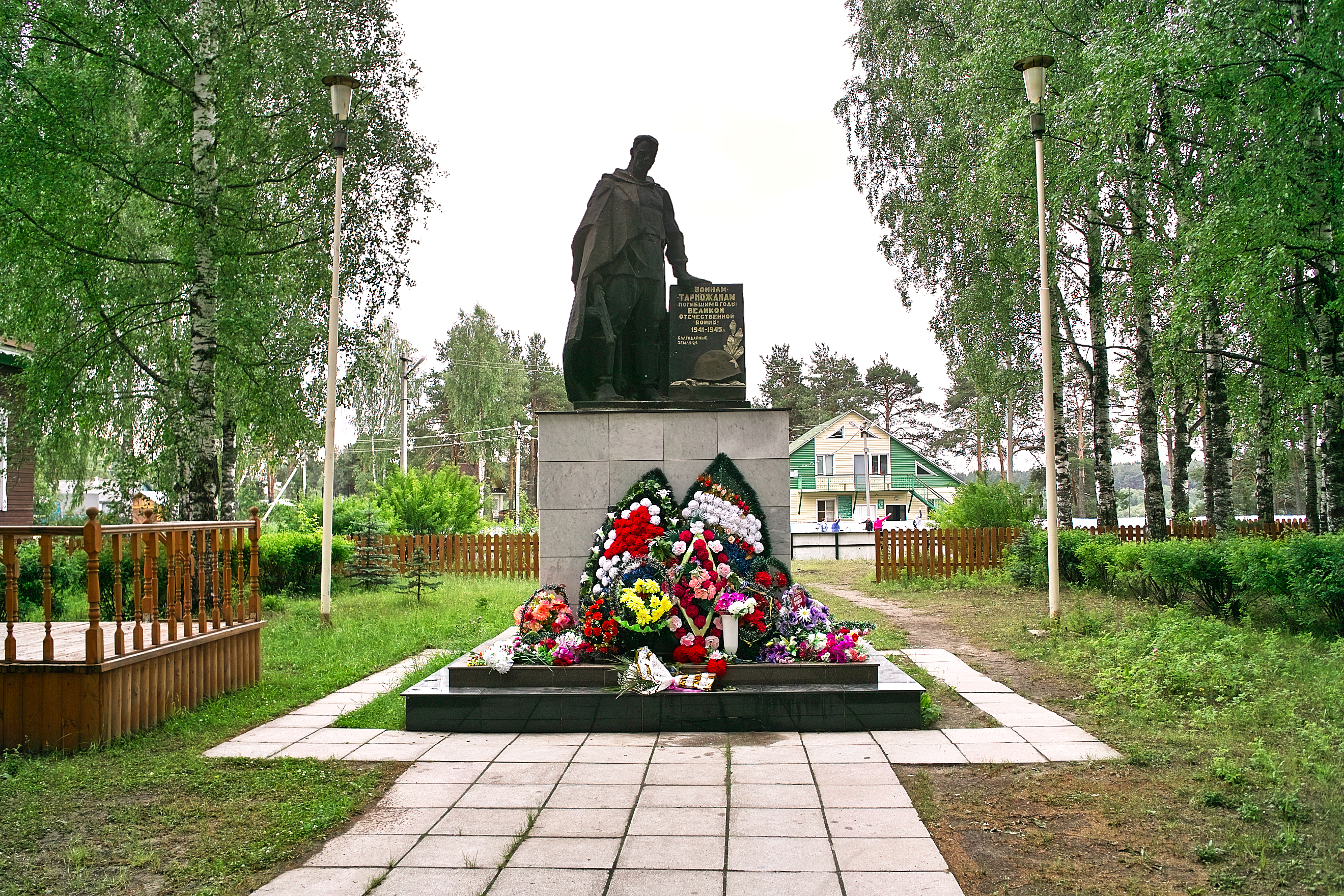
A memorial to soldiers fallen in World War II

Tarnogsky Gorodok has been first mentioned in the chronicles in 1453. The area produced crops, and the Kokshenga and the Vaga were used to transport bread to Arkhangelsk. In the course of the administrative reform carried out in 1708 by Peter the Great the area was included into Vazhsky Uyezd of Archangelgorod Governorate. In 1796, the area became part of Totemsky Volost in the center in the town of Totma. In 1890s, Tarnogsky Gorodok became the center of Shevdenitskaya Volost.

On July 15, 1929, Kokshengsky District with the administrative center in the selo of Tarnogsky Gorodok was established as part of Vologda Okrug of Northern Krai. It included parts of the former area of Totemsky Uyezd. July 30, 1931 Kokshengsky District and the neighboring Sukhonsky District were abolished, and Nyuksensky District with the center in the selo of Nyuksenitsa was established. January 25, 1935 Tarnogsky District with the administrative center in Tarnogsky Gorodok was established from some areas formerly in Nyuksensky and Totemsky Districts.

== Economy ==
=== Industry ===
The economy of the Tarnogsky Gorodok is based on timber industry. Food industry is also present, in particular, there is a butter factory.

=== Transportation ===
Tarnogsky Gorodok is on the paved road connecting Oktyabrsky in Arkhangelsk Oblast in the north with Totma in the south and Veliky Ustyug in the east. There also local roads. There is regular passenger bus service originating from Tarnogsky Gorodok.

Tarnogsky Gorodok was served by the Tarnogsky Gorodok Airport, which is currently defunct.

== Culture and recreation ==
Tarnogsky Gorodok hosts the Museum of Traditional Folk Culture. The ethnographic department of the museum is located in the selo of Zarechye. Chastushka, a local dittie (fast folksong).

The regional newspaper, Kokshenga, is published in Tarnogsky Gorodok.
