= Tarnogsky District =

Tarnogsky District Тарногский район (Russian)
- District
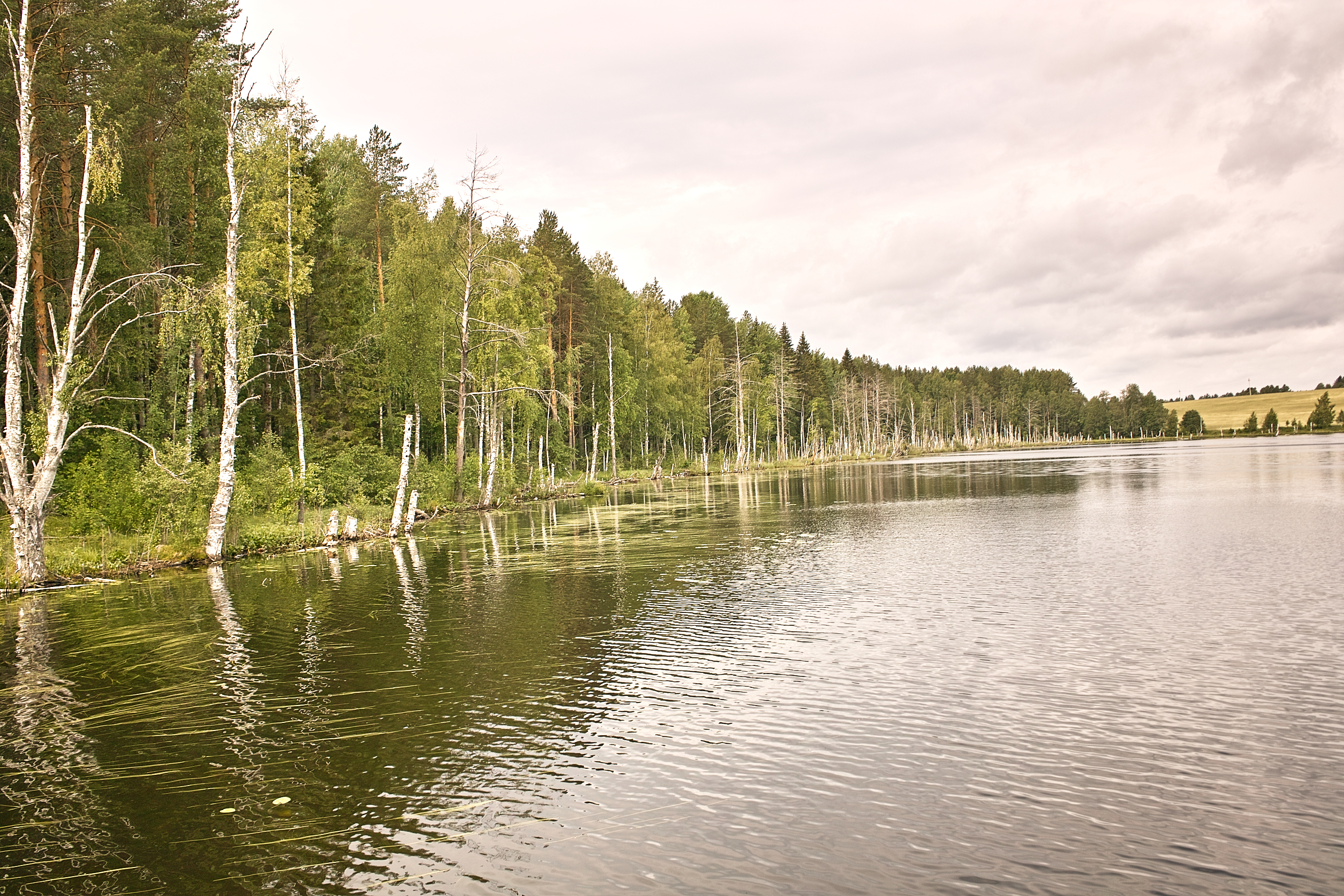
- A lake near Tarnogsky Gorodok

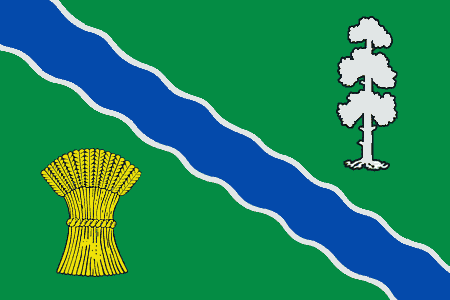
- Flag Coat of arms
- Location of Tarnogsky District in Vologda Oblast
- Coordinates: 60°30′N 43°33′E
- Country: Russia
- Federal subject: Vologda Oblast
- Established: January 25, 1935
- Administrative center: Tarnogsky Gorodok

Area
  - Total: 5,200 km^{2} (2,000 sq mi)

Population (2010 Census)
  - Total: 12,838
  - Density: 2.5/km^{2} (6.4/sq mi)
  - Urban: 0%
  - Rural: 100%

Administrative structure
  - Administrative divisions: 13 selsoviet
  - Inhabited localities: 265 rural localities

Municipal structure
  - Municipally incorporated as: Tarnogsky Municipal District
  - Municipal divisions: 0 urban settlements, 6 rural settlements
- Time zone: UTC+3 (MSK)
- OKTMO ID: 19642000
- Website: http://tarnoga-region.ru/

Tarnogsky District (Russian: Та́рногский райо́н) is an administrative and municipal district (raion), one of the twenty-six in Vologda Oblast, Russia. It is located in the northeast of the oblast and borders with Ustyansky District of Arkhangelsk Oblast in the north, Nyuksensky District in the east, Totemsky District in the south, and with Verkhovazhsky District in the west. The area of the district is 5,200 square kilometers (2,000 sq mi). Its administrative center is the rural locality (a selo) of Tarnogsky Gorodok. District's population: 12,838 (2010 census); 15,363 (2002 Census); 17,402 (1989 Soviet census). The population of Tarnogsky Gorodok accounts for 41.8% of the district's total population.

== Geography ==
The district is located at the divide between the Sukhona and the Vaga Rivers and belongs thus to the Northern Dvina's basin. The Sukhona forms the southeastern border of the district. The northeastern part of the district lies in the basin of the Uftyuga River, the left tributary of the Sukhona. The Uftyuga, as well as its main tributary the Sulonga, flow through the district. The rivers in the central, northern, and western parts of the district flow into the Kokshenga River, the right tributary of the Vaga. The main tributaries of the Kokshenga within the district are the Ileza and the Uftyuga (a different one from the tributary of the Sukhona).

Almost the whole of the district is covered by coniferous forests (taiga). The exception are the meadows in the floodplains.

== History ==
The area was populated by Finnic peoples and then colonized by the Novgorod Republic. Novgorod merchants used the Sukhona River as one of the main waterways leading to the White Sea and the Pechora. Already in the 12th century, Totma and the surrounding areas were under Novgorod's control. After the fall of Novgorod, the area became a part of the Grand Duchy of Moscow. Tarnogsky Gorodok was first mentioned in the chronicles in 1453. The area produced crops, and the Kokshenga and the Vaga were used to transport bread to Arkhangelsk.

In the course of the administrative reform carried out in 1708 by Peter the Great, the area was included into Vazhsky Uyezd of Archangelgorod Governorate. In 1780, the governorate was abolished and transformed into Vologda Viceroyalty. The latter was abolished in 1796, and the part of it which included Tarnogsky Gorodok became Vologda Governorate. The area became a part of Totemsky Volost with the seat in Totma. In the 1890s, Tarnogsky Gorodok became the seat of Shevdenitskaya Volost.

On July 15, 1929, several governorates, including Vologda Governorate, were merged into Northern Krai, and the uyezds were abolished. Instead, Kokshengsky District with the administrative center in the selo of Tarnogsky Gorodok was established as a part of Vologda Okrug. It included parts of the former area of Totemsky Uyezd. On July 30, 1931, Kokshengsky District and the neighboring Sukhonsky District were abolished, and Nyuksensky District with the administrative center in the selo of Nyuksenitsa was established. On January 25, 1935, Tarnogsky District with the administrative center in Tarnogsky Gorodok was established on the territories formerly in Nyuksensky and Totemsky Districts. In the following years, the first-level administrative division of Russia kept changing. In 1936, Northern Krai was transformed into Northern Oblast. In 1937, Northern Oblast itself was split into Arkhangelsk Oblast and Vologda Oblast. Tarnogsky District remained in Vologda Oblast ever since with the exception of the short period in 1962-1965, when some of the districts were merged.

== Politics ==
Head of Tarnogsky District	Date	Party
Vasily Vitalyevich Postnikov	2005—2009	
Sergei Mikhailovich Gusev	2009-2019	United Russia
Alexander Anatolyevich Yozhev	2019-2021	
Alexander Ivanovich Korepanov	since 2021	

== Economy ==
=== Industry ===
The economy of the district is based on timber industry. Food industry is also present; in particular, there is a butter factory in Tarnogsky Gorodok and a food factory in the selo of Krasnoye.

=== Agriculture ===
There are sixteen farms in the district: thirteen of them produce milk, two produce meat, and one produces eggs.

=== Transportation ===
Tarnogsky Gorodok stands on the paved road connecting Oktyabrsky in Arkhangelsk Oblast in the north with Totma in the south and Veliky Ustyug in the east. A short stretch of the road connecting Vologda and Veliky Ustyg runs within the limits of the district along the left bank of the Sukhona. There also local roads in the district. There is regular passenger bus service originating from Tarnogsky Gorodok.

While the Sukhona is navigable within the district, there is no passenger navigation.

Tarnogsky Gorodok was served by the Tarnogsky Gorodok Airport which is currently defunct.

== Culture and recreation ==
The district contains 4 objects classified as cultural and historical heritage by the Russian Federal law, and additionally 123 objects classified as cultural and historical heritage of local importance. Most of these are wooden farms and churches built prior to 1917.

The objects protected at the federal level are:

- The Potsky Pogost, in the village of Kaplinskaya, consisting of the wooden St. George Church (1700) and the brickstone St. Iliya Church (1858). The wooden church was moved to the Semyonkovo Open Air Museum, whereas the brickstone church is very much neglected.
- The All Saints Church in the village of Baklanovskoye (18th century); no longer exists.

The only state museum in the district is the Museum of Traditional Folk Culture in Tarnogsky Gorodok. The ethnographic department of the museum is located in the village of Zarechye.

Artist Dzhanna Tutundzhan lived in the village of Sergiyevskaya from the 1960s until her death in 2011, and many of her canvasses were inspired by the surrounding landscapes.
