= Volodymyr =

- Gender: male

Origin
- Origin: Ukraine
- Meaning: "ruler of the world", "ruler of peace" / "famous power", "bright and famous"

Other names
- Related names: Vladimir, Włodzimierz, Waldek, Waldemar, Woldemar, Voldemārs, Voldemar, Uladzimir, Valdimar, Vladimiros
- See also: Robert (name with the same meaning)

Volodymyr (Ukrainian: Володи́мир, romanized: Volodýmyr, pronounced [woloˈdɪmɪr]; Old East Slavic: Володимѣръ, romanized: Volodiměrŭ) is a Ukrainian given name of Old East Slavic origin. The related Ancient Slavic, such as Czech, Russian, Serbian, Croatian, etc. form of the name is Володимѣръ Volodiměr, which in other Slavic languages became Vladimir (from Church Slavonic: Владимѣръ, romanized: Vladiměr).

Diminutives include Volodyk, Volodia, Vova and Vlodko.

People named Volodymyr include:

- Volodymyr the Great (aka St. Volodymyr, Volodymyr I of Kyiv), Grand Prince of Kyiv
- Volodymyr Atamanyuk (born 1955), Soviet footballer
- Volodymyr Bahaziy (1902–1942), Ukrainian nationalist
- Volodymyr Balukh (born 1971), Ukrainian nationalist and former political prisoner of the Russian Federation
- Volodymyr Barilko (born 1994), Ukrainian football striker
- Volodymyr Bezsonov (born 1958), Ukrainian football manager and player
- Volodymyr Boyko (1938–2015), Ukrainian entrepreneur and politician
- Volodymyr Chesnakov (born 1988), Ukrainian footballer
- Volodymyr Demchenko (born 1981), Ukrainian sprinter who competed in the 2004 Summer Olympics
- Volodymyr Dyudya (born 1983), Ukrainian racing cyclist
- Volodymyr Gerun (born 1994), Ukrainian basketball player
- Volodymyr Groysman (born 1978), Prime Minister of Ukraine (2016–19)
- Volodymyr Herashchenko (born 1968), Ukrainian footballer
- Volodymyr Holubnychy (1936–2021), Ukrainian race walker
- Volodymyr Homenyuk (born 1985), Ukrainian footballer
- Volodymyr Horbulin (born 1939), Ukrainian politician, head of the Council for Foreign and Security Policy, former secretary of the National Security and Defense Council of Ukraine, former head of the National Space Agency of Ukraine
- Volodymyr Horilyi (born 1965), Soviet-Ukrainian football defender
- Volodymyr Huba (1938–2020), Ukrainian composer
- Volodymyr Inozemtsev (born 1964), Ukrainian triple jumper
- Volodymyr Ivasyuk (1949–1979), Ukrainian songwriter, composer and poet
- Volodymyr Kaliuzhniy (born 1972), Ukrainian fencer
- Volodymyr Kaplychnyi (1944–2004), Soviet footballer of Jewish descent
- Volodymyr Kedrowsky (1890–1970), political activist, diplomat, writer, and a colonel in the army of the Ukrainian People's Republic
- Volodymyr Kilikevych (born 1983), Ukrainian footballer
- Volodymyr Kozyavkin (1947–2022), Ukrainian physician and scientist
- Volodymyr Lozynskyi (1955–2020), Soviet-Ukrainian football coach and player
- Volodymyr Lukan (1961–2025), Ukrainian artist
- Volodymyr Lukashenko (born 1980), Ukrainian sabre fencer
- Volodymyr Lyutyi (born 1962), Ukrainian football coach and player
- Volodymyr Marchenko (1922–2026), Soviet-Ukrainian mathematician
- Volodymyr Matvienko (born 1938), Ukrainian economist and politician
- Volodymyr Muntyan (1946–2025), Soviet-Ukrainian football player and manager
- Volodymyr Mykhailenko (born 1973), Ukrainian decathlete
- Volodymyr Nikolaychuk (born 1975), Ukrainian backstroke swimmer
- Volodymyr Ohryzko (born 1956), Ukrainian diplomat, Minister of Foreign Affairs of Ukraine from 2007 to 2009
- Volodymyr Onyshchenko (born 1949), Soviet footballer
- Volodymyr Parasyuk (born 1987), Ukrainian public figure
- Volodymyr Pianykh (born 1951), Soviet footballer
- Volodymyr Ploskina (1954–2010), Ukrainian professional footballer
- Volodymyr Polovets, Ukrainian historian
- Volodymyr Polyovyi (born 1985), Ukrainian football defender
- Volodymyr Pryyomov (born 1986), Ukrainian football player
- Volodymyr Raskatov (1957–2014), Ukrainian swimmer
- Volodymyr Romaniuk (1925–1995), the Patriarch of the Ukrainian Orthodox Church – Kyiv Patriarchate
- Volodymyr Rybin (born 1980), Ukrainian racing cyclist
- Volodymyr Sabodan (1935–2014), head of the Ukrainian Orthodox Church
- Volodymyr Shatskykh (born 1981), Ukrainian former Olympic Greco-Roman wrestler
- Volodymyr Shcherbytsky (1918–1990), Ukrainian Communist and Soviet politician
- Volodymyr Sosiura (1898–1965) Ukrainian poet
- Volodymyr Starchyk (born 1980), Ukrainian racing cyclist
- Volodymyr Sydorenko (born 1976), Ukrainian former boxer
- Volodymyr Sysenko (1962–2025), Tajik-born Ukrainian footballer and manager
- Volodymyr Tkachenko (swimmer) (born 1965), Ukrainian swimmer who competed in the 1988 Summer Olympics
- Volodymyr Troshkin (1947–2020), Soviet-Ukrainian football player and coach
- Volodymyr Vynnychenko (1880–1951), Ukrainian political activist, writer, playwright, artist, first Prime Minister of Ukraine
- Volodymyr Yezerskiy (born 1976), Ukrainian football defender
- Volodymyr Zelenskyy (born 1978), current President of Ukraine, former actor and comedian
- Volodymyr Zhemchuhov (born 1970), Ukrainian insurgent
- Volodymyr Zyuskov (born 1981), Ukrainian long jumper

== See also ==
- Wolodarsky (surname)
