= Valdemaras =

- Gender: Male
- Language: Lithuanian
- Name day: 2 February

Origin
- Region of origin: Lithuania

Other names
- Variant forms: Valdemar, Valdemár, Valdemaro, Voldemar, Voldemārs, Waldemar, Woldemar
- Nickname: Valdas
- Related names: Vladimir

Valdemaras is a Lithuanian masculine given name, from Old High German name Waldemar. Its shortened form is Valdas.

The equivalent forms in other languages are:

- Scandinavian, Finnish : Valdemar
- Estonian : Voldemar
- German : Waldemar, Woldemar
- Hungarian : Valdemár
- Italian : Valdemaro
- Latvian : Voldemārs

Individuals with the name Valdemaras include:

- Valdemaras Chomičius (born 1959), Soviet and Lithuanian basketball player
- Valdemaras Katkus (born 1958), Lithuanian politician
- Valdemaras Martinkėnas (1965–2004), Soviet and Lithuanian footballer
- Valdemaras Venckaitis (born 1983), Lithuanian Greco-Roman wrestler
