= Vsevolod =

Vsevolod or Wsewolod (Russian: Все́волод [ˈfsʲevələt]; Ukrainian: Все́волод [ˈu̯sɛwolod]) is a Slavic male first name. Its etymology is from Slavic roots 'vse' (all) and 'volodeti' (to rule) and means 'lord-of-everything/everybody', (similar to another princely name, "Vladimir" or "Volodymyr"). It is equivalent to the Belarusian Usievalad, Polish Wszewład, Lithuanian Visvaldas, Latvian Visvaldis and German Wissewald. The corresponding Russian patronymic is Vsevolodovich.

Vsevolod may refer to:

== Medieval princes ==
- Vsevolod Vladimirovich (c. 983–1013), Prince of Volyn', son of Vladimir I of Kiev
- Vsevolod I of Kiev (Yaroslavich) (1030–1093), Grand Prince of Kievan Rus'
- Vsevolod Mstislavich (disambiguation)
- Vsevolod II of Kiev (Olegovich) (d. 1146), Grand Prince of Kievan Rus'
- Vsevolod III Yuryevich a.k.a. Vsevolod the Big Nest (1154–1212), Prince of Vladimir
- Vsevolod IV of Kiev (Svyatoslavich the Red) (d. 1215), twice Grand Prince of Kievan Rus' and Prince of Chernigov
- Visvaldis of Gerzike (died 1239), prince of Gerzike, later vassal of the Bishop of Riga

== Other persons ==
- Vsevolod Luknitsky (1844–1917), Russian general-lieutenant
- Vsevolod Krestovsky (1840–1895), Russian playwright and nationalist
- Vsevolod Eikhenbaum (1882–1945), nicknamed "Volin," Russian intellectual and member of the Makhnovshchina.
- Vsevolod Miller (1848–1913), Russian anthropologist and linguist
- Vsevolod Solovyov (1849–1903), Russian historical novelist
- Vsevolod Meyerhold (1874–1940), Russian and Soviet theater director
- Vsevolod Holubovych (1885-1939), Ukrainian politician and prime minister of the Ukrainian People’s Republic
- Vsevolod Abramovich, (1890–1913), Russian aviator
- Vsevolod Balitsky (1892–1937), Far Eastern and Ukrainian NKVD chief.
- Vsevolod Vishnevsky (1900–1951), Soviet dramatist and prose writer
- Vsevolod Starosselsky (1875–1935), Russian military officer
- Vsevolod Garshin (1855–1888), Russian author of short stories
- Vsevolod Sharonov (1901–1964), Russian and Soviet astronomer
- Vsevolod Aksyonov (1902–1960), Soviet film actor
- Vsevolod Rauzer (1908–1941), Soviet chess champion
- Vsevolod Tarasevich (1919–1998), Soviet photographer
- Vsevolod Blinkov (1918–1987), Soviet football player
- Vsevolod Pudovkin (1893–1953), Russian and Soviet film director, screenwriter, and actor
- Vsevolod Ivanov (1895–1963), Soviet novelist known for his stories set in the Russian Civil War
- Vsevolod Bobrov (1922–1979), Soviet athlete
- Vsevolod Safonov (1923–1992), Soviet film actor
- Vsevolod Murakhovsky (1926–2017), Soviet politician
- Vsevolod Nestayko (1930–2014), Ukrainian children's writer
- Vsevolod Shilovsky (born 1938), Soviet and Russian film actor
- Vsevolod Kukushkin (born 1942), Soviet Russian journalist, writer and ice hockey administrator
- Vsevolod Gakkel' (born 1953), Russian rock musician

== Other uses ==
- Vsevolod (1769; 74 guns) – Baltic Navy ship of the line burnt 1779
- Vsevolod (1796; 74 guns) – Baltic Navy ship of the line destroyed in the action near Baltiyskiy Port during the Anglo-Russian War (1807–1812)
- Vsevolod (1809; 66 guns) – Baltic Navy ship of the line hulked 1820

== See also ==
- Slavic names
