= Bergstad (disambiguation) =

Bergstad may refer to:

== Places ==
- Bergstad, a classification of mountain mining town in Norway
- Bergstaden, a local name for the town of Røros in Trøndelag, Norway

== People ==
- Terje Bergstad, a Norwegian painter and printmaker
- Valdimar Bergstað, an Icelandic equestrian

== See also ==
- Bergstadt
