= Miervaldis =

- Gender: Male
- Name day: 3 January

Origin
- Region of origin: Latvia

Miervaldis is a Latvian masculine given name, borne by some 600 men in Latvia.

Miervaldis is one of the relatively few names still in modern use from among the very many Latvian names of indigenous origin either revived from their previous occurrence in the Middle Ages, or invented, during the first Latvian National Awakening in the late 19th century. The second element -valdis ("ruler") (Note: As Valdis, this is a popular modern Latvian name in its own right.) was a particular favourite and featured in a large number of names now rare or obsolete. (Note: These included Ārvaldis, Druvvaldis, Gudrivaldis, Gunvaldis, Jūrvaldis ("sea-ruler"), Jūtvaldis ("emotion-ruler"), Lidvaldis ("flight-ruler"), Mežvaldis ("forest-ruler"), Rītvaldis ("morning-ruler"), Sirdsvaldis ("heart-ruler"), Sildsvaldis, Sunvaldis ("dog-ruler"), Tālivaldis, Visvaldis ("all-ruler") and Zemvaldis ("land-ruler"), and this is by no means a complete list.)

The literal meaning of Miervaldis is "peace-ruler": mier from miers (peace) and the element -valdis as above. It is directly comparable to the Old East Slavic name Vladimir (but with the two elements reversed) and the Germanic name Friedrich.

The name may refer to the following:

- Miervaldis Birze (1921–2000), Latvian writer, publicist and physician
- Miervaldis Adamsons, Latvian military leader
- Miervaldis Drāznieks, Latvian footballer
- Miervaldis Jurševskis (1921–2014), Latvian–Canadian chess master
- Miervaldis Polis (born 1948), Latvian artist
- Liz Lemon (Elizabeth Miervaldis Lemon), lead character of US comedy show 30 Rock
