= Voldemar =

- Gender: Male
- Name day: 18 April

Origin
- Region of origin: Estonia

Other names
- Related names: Waldemar, Woldemar, Valdemārs, Voldemārs, Valdimar

Voldemar is largely an Estonian masculine given name. People with the name Voldemar include:

- Voldemar Antoni (1886–1974), Ukrainian anarchist
- Voldemar Aussem (1879–1936), Soviet nobleman, communist official and diplomat
- Voldemar Hammer (1894–1982), Estonian politician
- Voldemar Ilja (1922–2010), Estonian Lutheran clergyman, theologian and church historian
- Voldemar Jaanus (1905–1977), Estonian politician
- Johann Voldemar Jannsen (1819–1890), Estonian journalist and poet
- Voldemar Kuslap (born 1937), Estonian opera and operetta singer and actor
- Voldemar Lender (1876–1939), Estonian engineer and the first Estonian mayor of Tallinn
- Voldemar Lestienne (1931–1990), French writer and journalist
- Voldemar Mägi (1914–1954), Estonian wrestler
- Voldemar Mellik (1887–1949), Estonian sculptor
- Voldemar Mettus (1894–1975), Estonian theater figure, journalist, writer, and translator
- Voldemar Noormägi (1895–1967), Estonian lightweight weightlifter
- Voldemar Oinonen (1891–1963), Finnish military commander
- Voldemar Ojansoon (1897–1942), Estonian lawyer and diplomat
- Voldemar Panso (1920–1977), Estonian stage director, actor, and theatrical teacher
- Voldemar Päts (1878–1958), Estonian artist, art teacher, and politician
- Voldemar Päts (1902–1942), Estonian cinematographer and actor
- Voldemar Peterson (1908–1976), Estonian footballer
- Voldemar Puhk (1897–1937), Estonian diplomat, businessman, economist, and politician
- Voldemar Rõks (1901–1941), Estonian footballer
- Voldemar Roolaan (1914–1991), Estonian wrestler
- Voldemar Vaga (1899–1999), Estonian art and architecture historian
- Voldemar Väli (1903–1997), Estonian Greco-Roman wrestler
- Voldemar Vöölmann (1887–1937), Estonian Communist politician and former mayor of Tallinn
