= Polovets =

== People ==
- Stan Polovets (born 1963), Russia-born American businessman
- Volodymyr Polovets, Ukrainian historian

== Other uses ==
- Kipchaks, a Turkic nomadic people
