= FK Liepājas Metalurgs =

Latvian football club

- Full name: Futbola Klubs Liepājas Metalurgs
- Founded: 1994
- Dissolved: 2013
- Ground: Daugava Stadium; Liepāja, Latvia
- Capacity: 5,083
- League: Virslīga (1997–2013)
- 2013: 5th
Home colours	Away colours

FK Liepājas Metalurgs (Latvian: Futbola klubs "Liepājas metalurgs") was a Latvian football club in the city of Liepāja that played in the Virslīga. They played at the Daugava Stadium (capacity 5,083). In 2005 Liepājas Metalurgs became the first team other than Skonto Riga to win the Virslīga since the league restarted in 1991. After the 2013 league season the club was dissolved due to the bankruptcy of its sole sponsor metallurgical plant Liepājas Metalurgs. The club was replaced by FK Liepāja, founded in 2014.

== History ==
Based in Liepāja, FK Liepājas Metalurgs, got their name from the city's metallurgical factory, founded in 1882, the only one of its kind in the Baltic states.

The history of the club can be traced back to 1945 when two football clubs were founded in Liepāja – Daugava Liepāja and Dinamo Liepāja.

=== Daugava Liepāja and Dinamo Liepāja: 1945–1947 ===
In its debut season Daugava Liepāja were runners-up in the Latvian league behind the champions FK Dinamo Rīga. In 1946 Daugava were coached by former Olimpija Liepāja defender Kārlis Tīls and with one of the best former Olimpija players Ernests Ziņģis in the attack the team won its first Latvian title. Both Valdis Pultraks and Voldemārs Sudmalis were in the squad. Daugava won the title again in 1947 when the squad included Miervaldis Drāznieks who went on to score 160 goals in the Latvian league. Daugava Liepāja also won the Latvian Cup in 1946 and 1947.

Dinamo Liepāja did not play in the Latvian top league. However, in 1948 Dinamo won the Latvian Cup with future Liepāja player Žanis Zviedris in the team.

=== Sarkanais Metalurgs: 1949–1961 ===
In 1949 Daugava Liepāja and Dinamo Liepāja merged to form Sarkanais Metalurgs which, for the next decade, was the strongest club in the Latvian league. In 1949, Sarkanais Metalurgs won both the league and the Latvian Cup. More titles followed in 1951, 1953, 1954, and from 1956 to 1958. They also won the Latvian Cup three times in a row from 1953 to 1955. In 1954 after beating Daugava Rīga in a match for the chance to play in the Soviet League a united Daugava-Metalurgs club was formed which included six Metalurgs players. In 1954, they competed in the "USSR Class B 1954, 2nd zone" of the Soviet First League the second tier in Soviet football. In the Latvian league the Metalurgs team was made up of mostly the reserve squad. In 1956 Daugava did not include the Metalurgs name in the Soviet League. In 1960 Sarkanais Metalurgs were given a place in the Soviet league and continued playing in the league under various names until 1990. In 1961, the club played as LMR Liepāja.

=== Zvejnieks Liepāja: 1962–1989 ===
In 1962, the club changed owners and was renamed Zvejnieks Liepāja. It was considered to be the second team for Daugava Rīga and the club's best players usually had to leave for Daugava. Also if Daugava players needed to have match practice they were sent to Liepāja. In the Soviet league Zvejnieks were usually a mid-table club. With the club playing in the Soviet and not the local league, players from other Republics of the Soviet Union came to play for Zvejnieks. In the 1960s, defender Mārtiņš Lube was the club's captain. Jurijs Romaņenkovs who went on to become the club's coach in 1989–90 played for Zvejnieks in the 1970s.

In the 1980s Vladimirs Žuks coached Zvejnieks and several bright players emerged with the club including Jānis Intenbergs, Ilmārs Verpakovskis, Alekseja Šarando, Vladimirs Babičevs and Ainārs Linards. A number of Daugava Rīga players also played for Zvejnieks including Raimonds Laizāns and Dainis Deglis.

=== Olimpija Liepāja: 1990–1993 ===
In 1990, the club was renamed and given the name of a former Latvian club that played in the 1920s–1930s – Olimpija Liepāja. As Olimpija the club played in the Soviet league in 1990, but in 1991, after Latvia regaining its independence, they played only in the Latvian league and finished in the third place. The Olimpija period saw the emergence of Viktors Dobrecovs at the club. After the breakup of the Soviet Union the first seasons in the newly independent Latvia were difficult for Olimpija as they got financially weaker from year to year.

=== FK Liepāja: 1994 ===
In 1994, the club was renamed FK Liepāja but played only one season with that name.

=== DAG Liepāja: 1995–1996 ===
In 1995 FK Liepāja was merged with FC Dag Rīga to form DAG Liepāja. The club reached the 1995 Latvian Cup final where they lost 3–0 to Skonto FC. Ainārs Linards returned to the club in 1995. In the Latvian league the club finished 8th out of ten clubs in 1996.

=== Baltika Liepāja: 1996–1997 ===
In 1996, the club changed owners again and became Baltika Liepāja. In 1996 Māris Verpakovskis, the son of Ilmārs Verpakovskis and future Latvia national football team international made his debut for the club. For some time the club was on the brink of bankruptcy and struggled to stop the best players from leaving the club. However, the club got new funding from the local Metallurgy factory and for the 1997 season at last had a stable budget and ambitious plans again.

=== FK Liepājas Metalurgs: 1997–2013 ===
In 1998 Metalurgs with Jurijs Popkovs as their head coach finished second behind Skonto in the Latvian Virslīga and each season up to 2004 Metalurgs finished second in the championship. In the Latvian Cup they also lost three cup finals. In 2005 Metalurgs finally became Virslīga champions and won the first title for Liepāja in an independent Latvia since the 1930s. In 2006 Metalurgs also finally won the Latvian Cup. The next league title came in 2009.

=== 2013 ===
After the 2013 league season the club was dissolved due to the bankruptcy of its sole sponsor metallurgical plant Liepājas Metalurgs. There were talks held with potential investors about salvation of the club, but due to lack of suitable options a decision was made to end its existence. The club was replaced by FK Liepāja, founded in 2014.

== Honours ==
- Virslīga
  - Champions (2): 2005, 2009
- Virslīga
  - Runners-up (8): 1998, 1999, 2003, 2004, 2006, 2007, 2008, 2011
- Latvian Cup
  - Champions (9): 1946, 1947, 1948, 1953, 1954, 1955, 1963, 1964, 2006
- Baltic League
  - Champions (1): 2007
- Latvian–Soviet League
  - Champions (9): 1946, 1947, 1949, 1951, 1953, 1954, 1956, 1957, 1958

== League and Cup history ==
=== Latvian SSR / Soviet Union ===
Sarkanais Metalurgs

Season	Division (Name)	Pos./Teams	Pl.	W	D	L	GS	GA	P	Latvian Football Cup
1989	1st (Virslīga)	7/(17)	31	14	6	11	46	40	34	

=== Soviet Union ===
Zvejnieks Liepaja

Season	Division (Name)	Pos./Teams	Pl.	W	D	L	GS	GA	P	Soviet Cup
1989	3rd (Soviet Second League)	19/(22)	42	5	16	21	28	59	26	did not participate

Olimpija Liepāja

Season	Division (Name)	Pos./Teams	Pl.	W	D	L	GS	GA	P	Soviet Cup
1990	4th (Soviet Second League B)	7/(17)	32	14	9	9	36	37	37	did not participate

=== Baltic ===
Liepājas Metalurgs

Season	Division (Name)	Pos./Teams	Pl.	W	D	L	GS	GA	P	Soviet Cup
1990	Baltic	16/(17)	32	4	5	23	20	97	13	did not participate

=== Latvian SSR / Soviet Union ===
Olimpija Liepāja

Season	Division (Name)	Pos./Teams	Pl.	W	D	L	GS	GA	P	Latvian Football Cup
1991	1st (Virslīga)	3/(20)	36	25	8	3	95	34	58	

=== Latvia ===
Olimpija Liepāja

Season	Division (Name)	Pos./Teams	Pl.	W	D	L	GS	GA	P	Latvian Football Cup
1992	1st (Virslīga)	6/(12)	22	10	5	7	33	25	25	
1993	1st (Virslīga)	7/(12)	18	3	6	9	24	46	12	

FK Liepāja

Season	Division (Name)	Pos./Teams	Pl.	W	D	L	GS	GA	P	Latvian Football Cup
1994	1st (Virslīga)	11/(12)	22	2	5	15	16	46	9	Runner-up

DAG Liepāja

Season	Division (Name)	Pos./Teams	Pl.	W	D	L	GS	GA	P	Latvian Football Cup
1995	1st (Virslīga)	8/(10)	24	5	5	10	29	57	28	Runner-up

FK Liepāja / FK Baltika

Season	Division (Name)	Pos./Teams	Pl.	W	D	L	GS	GA	P	Latvian Football Cup
1996	1st (Virslīga)	5/(10)	28	11	5	12	32	44	38	1/4 finals

FK Liepājas Metalurgs

Season	Division (Name)	Pos./Teams	Pl.	W	D	L	GS	GA	P	Latvian Football Cup
1997	1st (Virslīga)	5/(9)	24	9	4	11	27	32	31	did not participate
1998	1st (Virslīga)	2/(8)	28	17	6	5	62	25	57	Runner-up
1999	1st (Virslīga)	2/(8)	28	19	3	6	75	25	60	semi-finals
2000	1st (Virslīga)	3/(8)	28	16	7	5	51	25	55	Runner-up
2001	1st (Virslīga)	3/(8)	28	20	4	4	60	24	64	semi-finals
2002	1st (Virslīga)	3/(8)	28	15	6	7	56	31	51	Runner-up
2003	1st (Virslīga)	2/(8)	28	22	2	4	100	29	68	1/4 finals
2004	1st (Virslīga)	2/(8)	28	21	3	4	85	27	66	semi-finals
2005	1st (Virslīga)	1/(8)	28	22	5	1	85	19	71	Runner-up
2006	1st (Virslīga)	2/(8)	28	18	6	4	66	20	62	Winner
2007	1st (Virslīga)	2/(8)	28	18	4	6	42	21	58	1/4 finals
2008	1st (Virslīga)	2/(10)	28	14	11	3	48	25	53	1/4 finals
2009	1st (Virslīga)	1/(9)	32	25	4	3	96	23	79	1/4 finals
2010	1st (Virslīga)	3/(10)	27	19	4	4	70	20	61	1/4 finals
2011	1st (Virslīga)	2/(9)	32	22	4	6	74	26	70	Runner-up
2012	1st (Virslīga)	4/(10)	36	21	7	8	60	33	70	Runner-up
2013	1st (Virslīga)	5/(10)	27	11	7	9	54	35	40	semi-finals

== Participation in the Baltic League ==
Year	Position
2007/08	Winner
2008/09	Quarter-finals
2009/10	Semi-finals
2010/11	Semi-finals

== Europe record ==
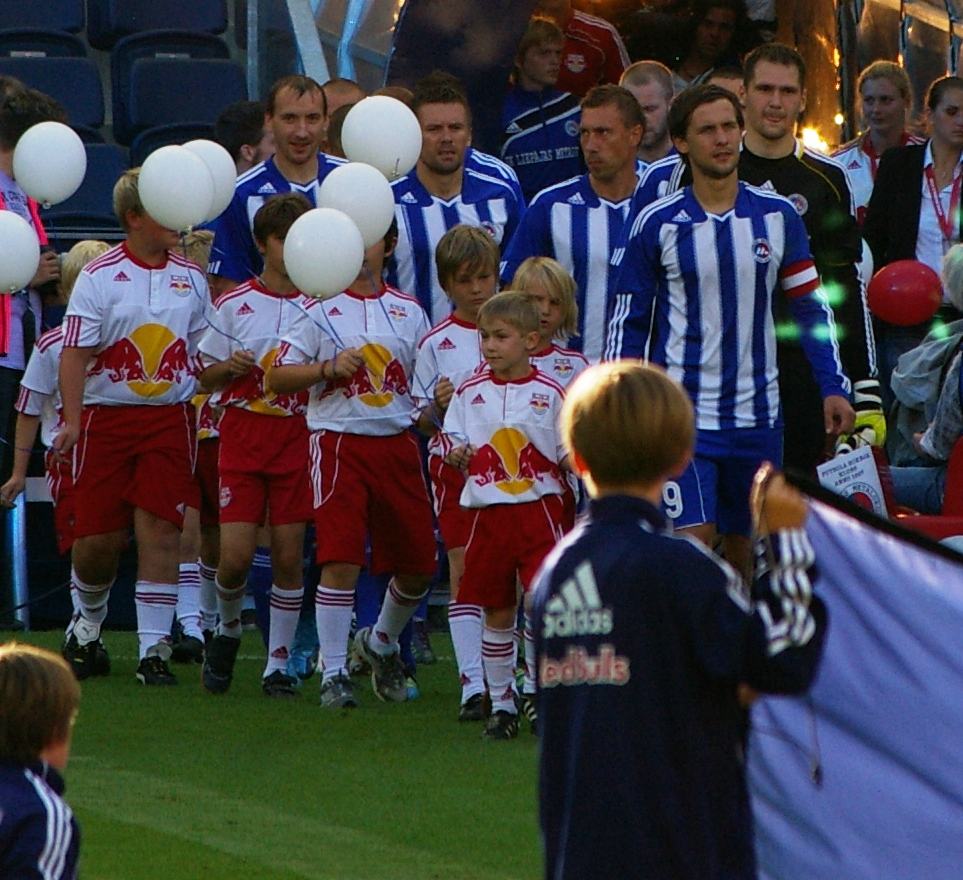
2011–12 UEFA Europa League qualifying round game in Salzburg against FC Salzburg

Season	Competition	Round	Country	Club	Home	Away	Aggregate
1998/99	UEFA Cup Winners' Cup	1R	(Iceland)	Keflavík	4–2	0–1	4–3
		2R	(Portugal)	Braga	0–0	0–4	0–4
1999/00	UEFA Cup	QR	(Poland)	Lech Poznań	3–2	1–3	4–5
2000/01	UEFA Cup	QR	(Norway)	Brann	1–1	0–1	1–2
2001	UEFA Intertoto Cup	1	(Republic of Ireland)	Cork City	1–0	2–1	3–1
		2	(Netherlands)	Heerenveen	3–2	1–6	4–8
2002/03	UEFA Cup	QR	(Austria)	Kärnten	0–2	2–4	2–6
2003/04	UEFA Cup	QR	(Romania)	Dinamo București	1–1	2–5	3–6
2004/05	UEFA Cup	1QR	(Faroe Islands)	Tórshavn	8–1	3–1	11–2
		2Q	(Sweden)	Östers	1–1	2–2	3–3 (a)
		1	(Germany)	Schalke 04	0–4	1–5	1–9
2005/06	UEFA Cup	1QR	(Faroe Islands)	Runavík	3–0	3–0	6–0
		2QR	(Belgium)	Genk	2–3	0–3	2–6
2006/07	UEFA Champions League	1QR	(Kazakhstan)	Aktobe	1–0	1–1	2–1
		2QR	(Ukraine)	Dynamo Kyiv	1–4	0–4	1–8
2007/08	UEFA Cup	1QR	(Belarus)	Dinamo Brest	1–1	2–1	3–2
		2QR	(Sweden)	AIK	3–2	0–2	3–4
2008/09	UEFA Cup	1QR	(Northern Ireland)	Glentoran	2–0	1–1	3–1
		2QR	(Romania)	Vaslui	0–2	1–3	1–5
2009/10	UEFA Europa League	2QR	(Georgia (country))	Dinamo Tbilisi	2–1	1–3	3–4
2010/11	UEFA Champions League	2QR	(Czech Republic)	Sparta Prague	0–3	0–2	0–5
2011/12	UEFA Europa League	2QR	(Austria)	Red Bull Salzburg	1–4	0–0	1–4
2012/13	UEFA Europa League	1QR	(San Marino)	La Fiorita	4–0	2–0	6–0
		2QR	(Poland)	Legia Warsaw	2–2	1–5	3–7
2013/14	UEFA Europa League	1QR	(Wales)	Prestatyn Town FC	1–2	2–1	3–3 (3–4 p)

== UEFA Team Ranking 2012/13 ==
Rank	Country	Team	Points
282	(Finland)	FC Honka Espoo	3.701
283	(Slovenia)	NK Olimpija Ljubljana	3.691
284	(Luxembourg)	FC Differdange 03	3.675
285	(Latvia)	Liepājas Metalurgs	3.658
286	(Sweden)	Örebro SK	3.625

== Sponsors ==
Role	Sponsors
General sponsors	(Latvia) Liepājas Metalurgs (bankruptcy in 2013)
Kit manufacturer	(Germany) Adidas

== Notable former players ==
FK Liepājas Metalurgs players who have either appeared for their respective national team at any time or received an individual award while at the club.

- (Latvia) Māris Verpakovskis
- (Latvia) Andrejs Rubins
- (Latvia) Jānis Ikaunieks (footballer)
- (Latvia) Dāvis Ikaunieks
- (Latvia) Deniss Rakels
- (Latvia) Oskars Kļava
- (Latvia) Deniss Ivanovs
- (Latvia) Viktors Dobrecovs
- (Latvia) Ģirts Karlsons
- (Latvia) Genādijs Soloņicins
- (Latvia) Vladimirs Kamešs
- (Latvia) Vladimirs Babičevs
- (Latvia) Ritus Krjauklis
- (Latvia) Valentīns Lobaņovs
- (Latvia) Ilmārs Verpakovskis
- (Latvia) Artūrs Zakreševskis
- (Latvia) Dzintars Zirnis
- (Latvia) Armands Zeiberliņš
- (Latvia) Pāvels Mihadjuks
- (Latvia) Andrejs Prohorenkovs
- (Latvia) Jurģis Pučinskis
- (Latvia) Maksims Rafaļskis
- (Latvia) Kristaps Grebis
- (Latvia) Dzintars Sproģis
- (Latvia) Pāvels Šteinbors
- (Brazil) Antonio Ferreira de Oliveira Junior
- (Japan) Takafumi Akahoshi
- (Belarus) Valeri Shantalosau
- (Belarus) Radzislaw Arlowski
- (Lithuania) Nerijus Valskis
- (Lithuania) Mindaugas Kalonas
- (Lithuania) Artūras Rimkevičius
- (Lithuania) Darius Gvildys
- (Lithuania) Giedrius Žutautas
- (Lithuania) Tomas Tamošauskas
- (Russia) Vladimir Tatarchuk
- (Russia) Aleksei Bobrov
- (Russia) Sergei Skoblyakov
- (Russia) Aleksandr Katasonov
- (Russia) Mikhail Nikolayevich Solovyov
- (Armenia) David Yurchenko
- (Ukraine) Serhiy Seleznyov
- (Ukraine) Yuriy Hrytsyna
- (Moldova) Andrei Cojocari

== Managers ==
- (Latvia) Kārlis Tīls (1945–48), (Daugava Liepāja coach)
- (Latvia) Arturs Bušs (1949–51)
- (Latvia) Ernests Ziņģis(1953–54)
- (Latvia) Afanasijs Ptičkins (1954–60)
- (Latvia) Hārdijs Blūms (1961)
- (Russia) Lev Korchebokov (1962–63)
- (Latvia) Afanasijs Ptičkins (1964–65)
- (Russia) Lev Korchebokov (1966–67)
- (Latvia) Boriss Graps (1967–68)
- (Latvia) Raimonds Dambis (1969–70)
- (Latvia) Zigfrīds Driķis (1971)
- (Latvia) Afanasijs Ptičkins (1971–75)
- (Latvia) Vladimirs Davidovs (1976–78)
- (Latvia) Valentīns Obrivins (1976–78)
- (Israel) Boris Reinhold (1978–80)
- (Latvia) Valentīns Obrivins (1981–82)
- (Latvia) Eduards Vlasovs (1983–84)
- (Latvia) Vladimirs Žuks (1985–88)
- (Latvia) Jānis Mežeckis (1989–90)
- (Latvia) Aivars Sveilis (1991)
- (Latvia) Jānis Zuntners (1991)
- (Latvia) Aleksandrs Jurenko (1992)
- (Latvia) Jānis Zuntners (1993–94)
- (Latvia) Eduards Safjanovs (1994)
- (Latvia) Ilmārs Verpakovskis (1994)
- (Latvia) Viktors Ņesterenko (1995)
- (Latvia) Vladimirs Žuks (1996)
- (Lithuania) Šendelas Geršovičius (1996)
- (Latvia) Jānis Gilis (1997)
- (Latvia) Jurijs Popkovs (1998–00)
- (Russia) Anatoli Shelest (2000–01)
- (Russia) Vladimir Mukhanov (2002)
- (Latvia) Viktors Lukins (July 2002 – June 2003)
- (Lithuania) Benjaminas Zelkevičius (Jan 2004 – Dec 2007)
- (Latvia) Jurijs Andrejevs (2007–08)
- (Latvia) Vladimirs Osipovs (Dec 2007 – July 2008), (caretaker)
- (Germany) Rüdiger Abramczik (Aug 2008 – Dec 2010)
- (Latvia) Vladimirs Osipovs (Jan 2011–12)
- (Latvia) Dmitrijs Kalašņikovs (2012), (caretaker)
- (Latvia) Jānis Intenbergs (Nov 2012–2013)

== Women's team ==
The women's team played in the Latvian highest league and won the championship in 2010 and 2012. It represented Latvia at the 2011–12 UEFA Women's Champions League. It was the first time a team from Latvia had entered the competition since its creation in 2001–02.

== See also ==
- FK Liepāja
