= Tarasevich =

Tarasevich (Cyrillic: Тарасевич) is a gender-neutral Slavic surname. Notable people with the surname include:

- Arseny Tarasevich-Nikolaev (born 1993), Russian concert pianist
- Grigoriy Tarasevich (born 1995), Russian swimmer
- Sergey Tarasevich (born 1973), Belarusian rower
- Svetlana Tarasevich (born 1979), Belarusian gymnast
- Vsevolod Tarasevich (1919–1998), Soviet photographer
