= Katkus =

Katkus is a Lithuanian surname. Notable people with the surname include:

- Valdemaras Katkus (born 1958), Lithuanian politician
- Vytautas Katkus (born 1991), Lithuanian film director, cinematographer, and screenwriter
