= Valdimarsson =

Valdimarsson is an Icelandic patronymic surname, literally meaning "son of Valdimar". People with the last name include:

- Hákon Valdimarsson (born 2001), Icelandic footballer
- Hannibal Valdimarsson (1903–1991), Icelandic politician
- Helgi Valdimarsson (born 1936), Icelandic scientist
- Jón Steindór Valdimarsson (born 1958), Icelandic politician
- Þórarinn Ingi Valdimarsson (born 1990), Icelandic footballer

== See also ==
- Valdimar
- Waldemar / Valdemar
