= Valto =

Valto is a Finnish name which originated as a variation of the Scandinavian name Valdemar. As of mid-2012, more than 2300 people living in Finland had the name Valto.

== Notable people ==
- Valto Olenius (1920–1983), Finnish Olympic pole vaulter
- Valto Karhumäki, Finnish aviation pioneer
