= Aleksei Bobrov =

Aleksei Bobrov may refer to:

- Aleksei Bobrov (footballer, born 1972), Russian football player
- Aleksei Bobrov (footballer, born 1973), Russian football player
