= Valdis =

Male given name

- Gender: Male
- Name day: 11 December

Origin
- Region of origin: Latvia

Other names
- Related names: Valdemārs, Voldemārs, Visvaldis, Miervaldis, Tautvaldis, Zemvaldis, Ciemvalids, Tālivaldis, Druvvaldis, Gunvaldis, Arvaldis

Valdis is a Latvian language masculine given name. It is derived from two possible sources; from the Latvian word valdīt ("rule") or as a shortened form of Valdemārs, the Latvian form of Waldemar. Valdis may refer to the following:

- Valdis Birkavs (born 1942), Latvian politician and Prime Minister of Latvia
- Valdis Celms (born 1943), Latvian artist and neopagan leader
- Valdis Dombrovskis (born 1971), Latvian politician, Prime Minister of Latvia (2009–2013)
- Valdis Ģīlis (born 1954), Latvian politician
- Valdis Mintals (born 1979), Estonian figure skater
- Valdis Muižnieks (1935–2013), Latvian basketball player
- Valdis Muktupāvels (born 1958), Latvian ethnomusicologist, composer, musician and teacher
- Valdis Pelšs (born 1967), Latvian-born Russian television personality, musical artist and actor
- Valdis Pultraks (1922–1972), Latvian footballer
- Valdis Valters (born 1957), Latvian basketball player
- Valdis Zatlers (born 1955), Latvian politician, President of Latvia (2007–2011)
- Valdis Zeps (1932–1996), Latvian-American linguist and professor

== See also ==
- Valdís (Icelandic given name)
