= Valdís =

Female given name

- Gender: Female

Origin
- Meaning: probably “Valkyrie”
- Region of origin: Nordic region

Other names
- Related names: Valbjörg, Valborg, Valgerður

Valdís is an Icelandic female given name. It is also used as a (very rare) female name in the other Nordic countries. Its use in Iceland dates back to the settlement period. Although having a nearly identical spelling, it is completely unrelated to the Latvian male given name Valdis.

The name is formed from two very common Norse name elements, val and dís, meaning respectively ‘those dead in battle’ (compare Valkyrie) and ‘goddess’ or ‘female guardian-angel’.

Notable people with the name Valdís include:

- Steinunn Valdís Óskarsdóttir (born 1965), Icelandic politician, mayor of Reykjavík 2004–2006
- Valdís Óskarsdóttir (born 1950), Icelandic film editor
- Valdís Þóra Jónsdóttir (born 1989), Icelandic professional golfer
