= Valgerður =

Valgerður is a given name. Notable people with the name include:

- Valgerður Bjarnadóttir (born 1950), Icelandic politician
- Valgerður Gunnarsdóttir, Icelandic politician
- Valgerður Hafstað (1930–2011), Icelandic painter
- Valgerður Þóroddsdóttir (born 1989), Icelandic poet
- Valgerður Sverrisdóttir (born 1950), Icelandic politician
- Guðrún Valgerður Stefánsdóttir, Icelandic academic
