= Arula =

Village in Estonia

- Village
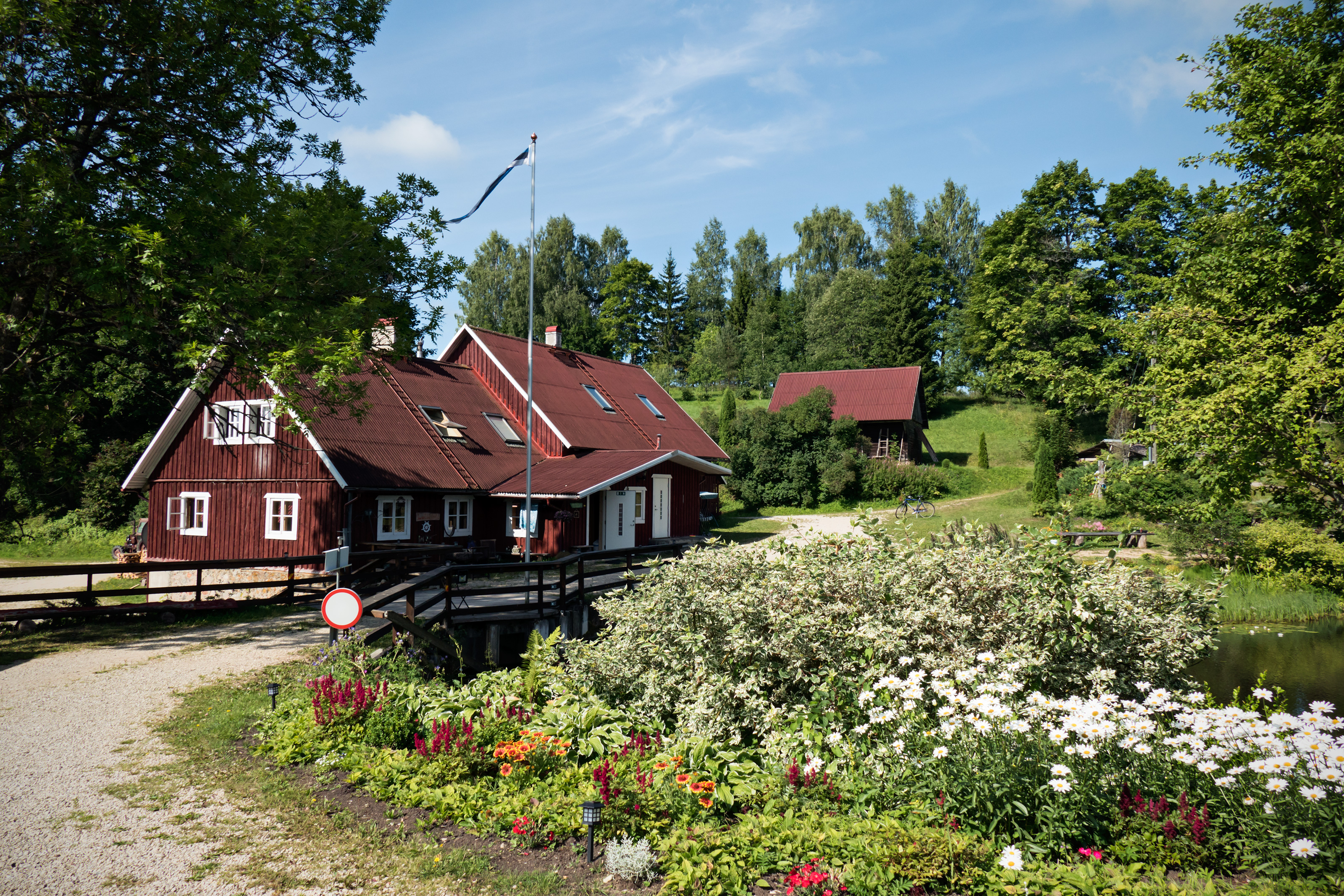
- Lutsu tourist farm in Arula

- Location in Estonia
- Coordinates: 58°02′17″N 26°21′55″E
- Country: Estonia
- County: Valga County
- Municipality: Otepää Parish

Population (07.02.2008)
  - Total: 65

Arula is a village in Otepää Parish, Valga County in southeastern Estonia. It has a population of 65 (as of 7 February 2008).

== Notable people ==
Notable people that were born or lived in Arula include:

- Alide Ertel (1877–1955), prose writer, playwright, and poet, died in Arula
- Yri Naelapea (1896–1969), writer, journalist, and publisher, born in Arula
- Mats Traat (1936–2022), poet and author, born in Arula

== Gallery ==
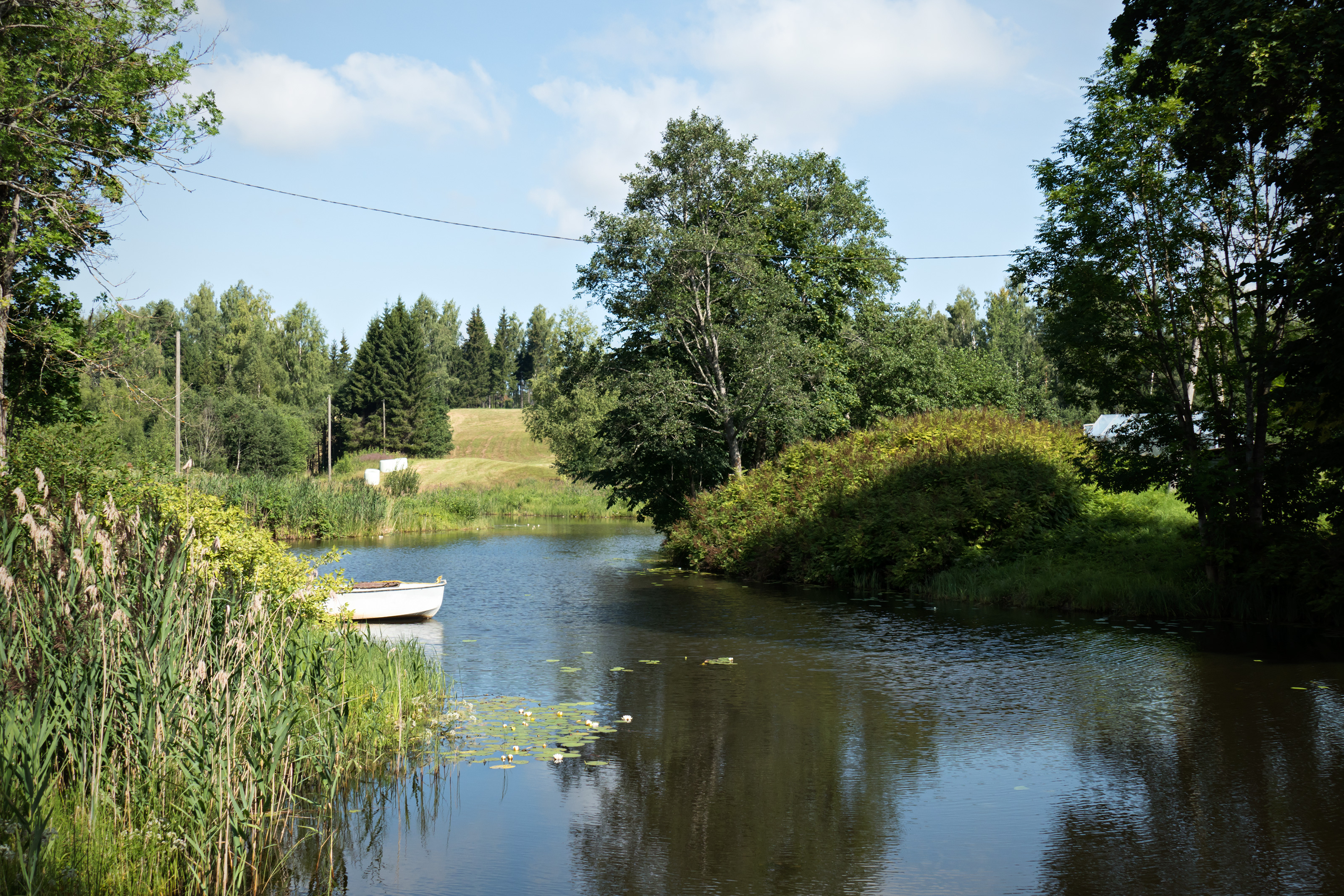
Lutsu mill lake

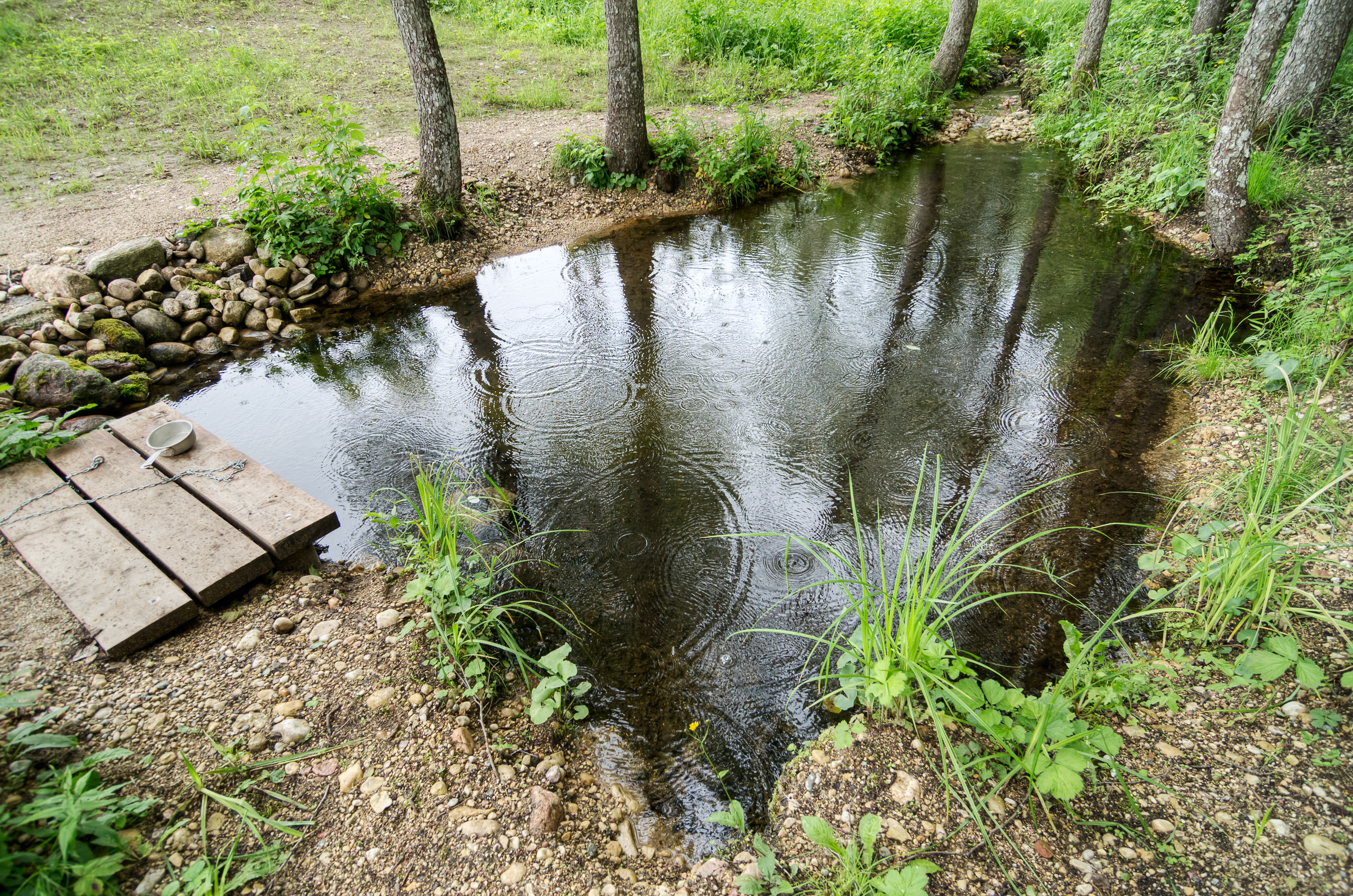
Arula Emaläte spring

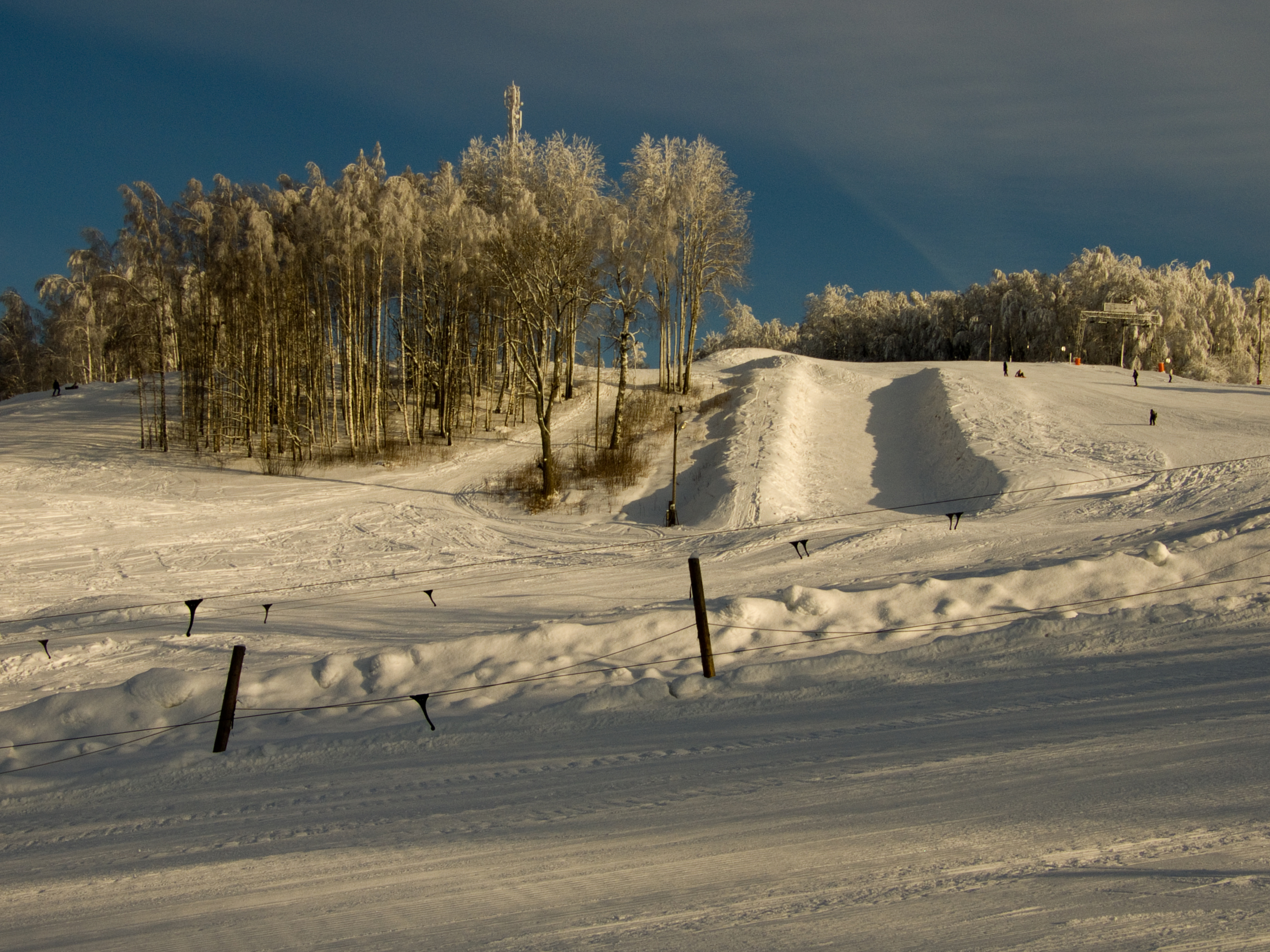
Kuutsemägi, the highest point in Valga County (217 meters)
