= Mats Traat =

Estonian poet and author (1936–2022)

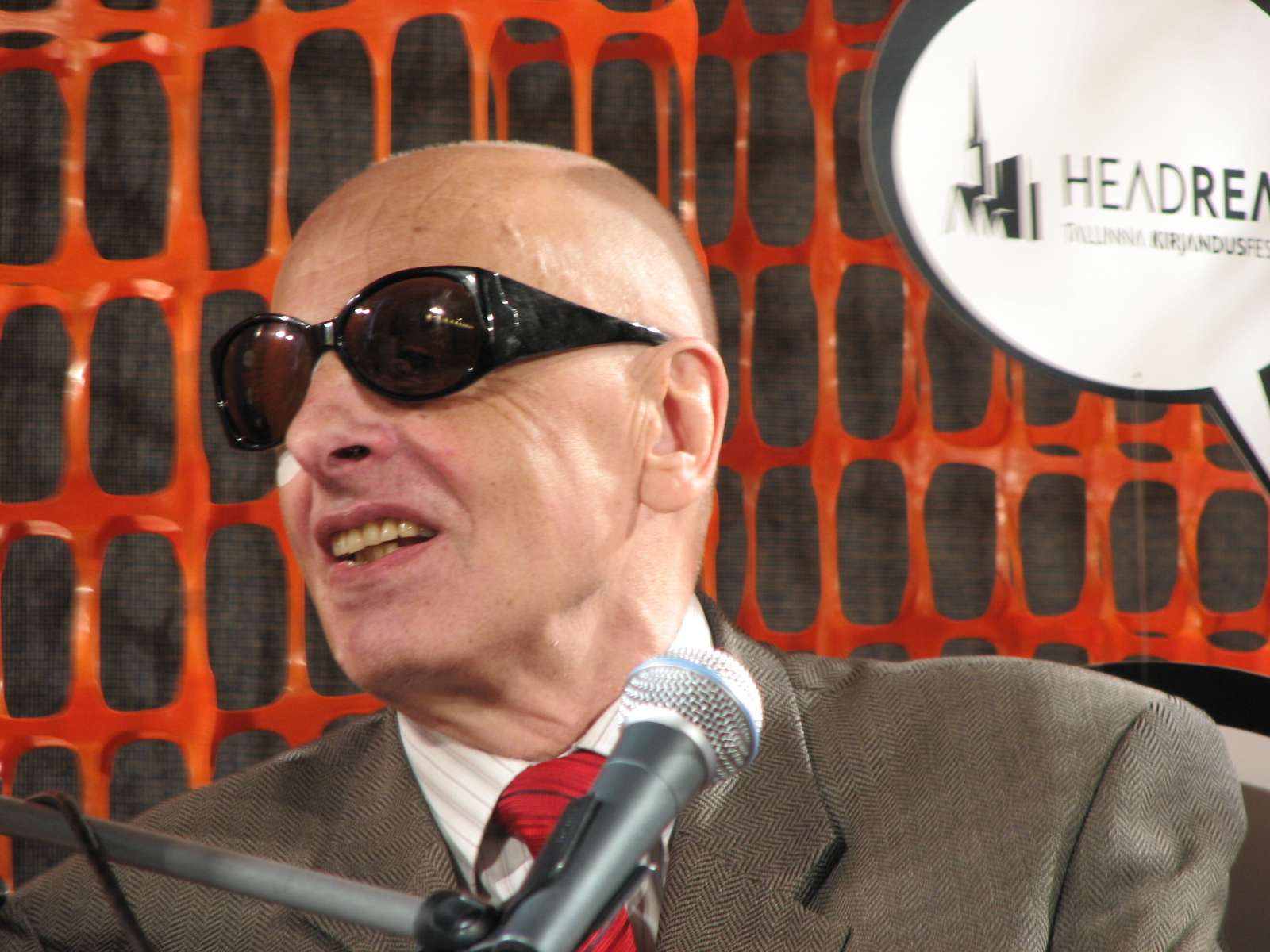
Traat in 2011

Mats Traat (23 November 1936 – 27 June 2022) was an Estonian poet, poetry translator, and author. He was also a singer and an actor.

== Career ==
Traat was born in Arula, near Otepää, Estonia. He debuted in 1962 with a collection of poetry. He published over 20 anthologies of poetry. His poetry frequently dealt with social commentary and society's adoration for science. His lyrics praised nature and his native country.

Traat wrote about the indigenous Estonian population. His central topics were the changes to and the developments of Estonian rural life over the course of the centuries, with an emphasis on people's ethical choices. In Trees Were, Trees Were Tender Brothers (1979), a young protagonist wages a struggle to keep a farm running, something he never desired to do.

Pasqueflower, Antidote for Sadness (1982, uncensored version 1990) covered the fate of the ancient Livonians, who were conquered and formally aligned with the Christian invaders while maintaining pagan convictions, and the problems of rural life during the post-World War II Soviet occupation of Estonia.

Dance around the Steam Boiler (1971; originally a film script, which was finally completed in 1988) illustrated the changes in rural life over half a century with five "dances" with a portable engine. In the movie, which was filmed during the perestroika era, a sixth "dance" was added, showing the old age of the main characters against a background of the typical rural scenes of 1980s: industrial and technological developments combined with reckless destruction of the environment.

Traat's short story "The Cross of Power" won the Friedebert Tuglas Award for Short Prose.

He also translated poetry into from Polish, Macedonian, Czech, and other languages to Estonian language.

== Sources ==
- Estonian Literature Information Center
