= Ilmārs Verpakovskis =

Latvian footballer (1958–2022)

Personal information
- Date of birth: 15 October 1958
- Place of birth: Riga, Latvian SSR, Soviet Union
- Date of death: 6 February 2022 (aged 63)
- Height: 1.74 m (5 ft 9 in)
- Position: Midfielder

Senior career*
Years	Team	Apps	(Gls)
1979–1989	Zvejnieks Liepāja	271	(62)
1989–1990	FC Daugava Riga	16	(3)
1990–1992	RAF Jelgava	32	(13)
1992–1995	FK Liepājas Metalurgs	50	(13)
Total		369	(91)

International career
1991–1992	Latvia	3	(0)

Managerial career
- 1994: FK Liepājas Metalurgs
- * Club domestic league appearances and goals

Ilmārs Verpakovskis (15 October 1958 – 6 February 2022) was a Latvian footballer who played as a midfielder. He spent the bulk of his career with the Latvian club FK Liepājas Metalurgs, and was the father of the Latvia national team's all-time top scorer, Māris Verpakovskis.

== International career ==
Verpakovskis made three appearances for the Latvia national team from 1991–1992. His first two appearances were in the unofficial 1991 Baltic Cup. His final appearance was in Latvia's first ever FIFA recognized match, a 2–0 friendly loss to Romania on 8 April 1992.

== Personal life and death ==
Verpakovskis was the father of Māris Verpakovskis, who became a renowned Latvian footballer. Verpakovskis managed his son in his brief stint as player-manager for FK Liepājas Metalurgs in 1994. The Verpakovskis were the only father-son pair to both play for the Latvia national football team. He died on 6 February 2022, at the age of 63.
