= 1989 Latvian SSR Higher League =

Latvian football league season for the highest division

Latvian SSR Higher League
- Season: 1989

Statistics of Latvian Higher League in the 1989 season.

== Overview ==
It was contested by 17 teams, and RAF won the championship.

== League standings ==
Pos	Team	Pld	W	D	L	GF	GA	GD	Pts	Promotion or relegation
1	RAF	31	22	7	2	72	26	+46	51	Promotion to Baltic Championship
2	Torpedo Rīga	31	19	7	5	70	26	+44	45	Promotion to Baltic Championship
3	Celtnieks Daugavpils	31	18	7	6	72	23	+49	43	Promotion to Baltic Championship
4	Pardaugava	31	15	8	8	40	27	+13	38	Promotion to Baltic Championship
5	Jurnieks	31	14	7	10	62	45	+17	35	
6	Celtnieks Rīga	31	13	8	10	50	40	+10	34	
7	Sarkanais Metalurgs	31	14	6	11	46	40	+6	34	Promotion to Baltic Championship
8	Torpedo Rezekne	31	12	6	13	46	64	−18	30	
9	VEF	31	12	5	14	42	42	0	29	
10	Apgaismes Tehnika	31	11	7	13	43	32	+11	29	
11	Dizelists	31	9	10	12	33	46	−13	28	
12	Rigas Audums	31	10	5	16	47	87	−40	25	
13	Gauja	31	8	8	15	44	51	−7	24	
14	Vārpa Ilūkste	31	9	6	16	30	55	−25	24	
15	Betons	31	6	3	22	29	69	−40	15	
16	FK Venta	31	4	4	23	29	82	−53	12	
17	Junioru izlase	16	4	8	4	20	20	0	16 (Note: Only played first 16 rounds)	

Source: rsssf.com
