= Yri Naelapea =

Estonian writer, journalist, and publisher (1896–1969)

- Born: May 22, 1896; Arula, Estonia
- Died: May 5, 1969 (aged 72); Los Angeles, United States
- Education: University of Tartu
- Occupations: Writer, journalist, and publisher
- Relatives: Voldemar Ojansoon

Yri Naelapea (first name Georg until 1938; May 22, 1896 – May 5, 1969) was an Estonian writer, journalist, and publisher.

== Early life and education ==
Yri Naelapea was born on May 22, 1896, at the Pülme farm in Arula, Estonia. Later, his parents Karl (Kaarel) Naelapää (1856–1938) and Helena "Leena" Naelapea (née Rebane, 1871–1951) operated a farm near Vidrike, where they were breeders of Estonian Red cattle. Karl Naelapea was a public figure active in various societies. The ancestors of the family came from Viljandi County. Naelapea attended the village school in Rebaste, the parish school in Otepää, Hugo Treffner High School in Tartu, and Tartu Alexander High School. He graduated from the Faculty of Law at the University of Tartu.

== Career ==
Naelapea volunteered in the Estonian War of Independence as a medic in the 3rd Division of the 7th Infantry Regiment. Starting in 1924, Naelapea worked in the editorial office of Postimees. He became a member of the Estonian Writers' Union in 1929. In the same year, he founded a publishing house in Tartu and started publishing the richly illustrated cultural magazine Olion. The Estonian National Writers' Association was a literary organization founded in 1933 by thirteen Estonian cultural figures at the initiative of Naelapea. Naelapea was also a member of the Estonian PEN Club. Naelapea was a member of the editorial board of Vaba Sõna in 1935, editor of Kauni Kodu in 1937, and editor-in-chief of Väljavaade from 1939 to 1940.

Naelapea officially Estonianized his first name, Georg, to Yri in 1938, considering the Finno-Ugric y in the spirit of Johannes Aavik to be more natural to Estonian culture than the German dotted ü. In fact, he had been using this form of his name since 1920. However, his Estonianized name appears as Üri in Riigi Teataja on March 3, 1938.

Naelapea was a patriot and a native of southern Estonia, and he conducted research around Otepää. He wrote poems and other texts in the South Estonian Tartu dialect. Some of his plays and his book Kaarnasaare robinsonid (The Robinsons of Kaarnasaare) written under the pseudonym Olaf Rood are also based on South Estonian subjects.

The NKVD arrested Naelapea's brother-in-law, the Estonian career diplomat Voldemar Ojansoon, in 1940, and Ojansoon died in captivity in Russia. When the Soviet occupation forces invaded Estonia again, Naelapea fled to Germany in 1944. An important archive with material from many of his projects was left behind in Estonia. In 1949, Naelapea relocated to Australia, where Olion continued to be published from 1956 to 1960. The Naelapea family moved to Canada in 1958 and to the United States in 1963. Even in exile, Naelapea was active both in journalism and in Estonian cultural life. He was a member of Korporatsioon Ugala, into which he invested significant energy.

The topics that Naelapea wrote about were mostly cultural-historical, as well as local history and colorful travelogues. Founding, publishing, and editing Olion was Naelapea's greatest achievement; the magazine was one of the highest-quality publications in Estonia at the time, unrivaled in content or form.

In 1989, the major Soviet-era publishing house Eesti Raamat was restructured. Under a new director, Vello Lindsalu (1937–1990), it was decided to name the branch that separated from it Olion, even though that name had been used before and had no connection with Eesti Raamat. As a result, many people are aware of the publishing house Olion, which existed from 1989 to 2013, but Naelapea's achievement—the cultural magazine Olion published between 1929 and 1960 (albeit irregularly)—remains overshadowed by the former publishing house.

== Pseudonyms ==
Naelapea wrote under several pseudonyms. He published short stories and novels under the pseudonym Olaf Rood, and he wrote historical studies under the pseudonym Kaljo Randa. He wrote the 1924 novel Metsade laps (The Child of the Forests) under the pseudonym Alfred Georg Saroughe.

== Bibliography ==
- 1923: Krimmi ja Kaukasuse päikesemail (Crimea and the Caucasus in the Sun). Tartu: Sõnavara
- 1924: Metsade Laps: romaan Aafrika ja Lõuna-Ameerika põlistest metsadest (The Child of the Forests: A Novel about the Primeval Forests of Africa and South America). Tallinn: Põhjanael
- 1925: Vene revolutsiooni kalender (Calendar of the Russian Revolution). Tartu: Odamees
- 1926: Uulu. Tartu: Sõnavara
- 1926: Bertil Holmqvist. Tartu: Postimehe kirjastus
- 1926: Eestimaa õiguse ajalugu (History of Estonian Law). Tartu
- 1927: Kaarli ja tundmatu (Karli and the Unknown). Tartu: Sõnavara
- 1928: Vahased vabarnad (Waxy Raspberries). Tartu: Postimehe kirjastus
- 1930: Raeweski Rein. Tartu: Oskar Luik'i kirjastus
- 1930: Kaarnasaare robinsonid – jutustis noorsoole (The Robinsons of Kaarnasaare: A Story for Young People). Tartu: Oskar Luik'i kirjastus
- 1932: Küla-mehi (Village Men). Tartu: Olion
- 1932: Lumised luuad (Snowy Brooms). Tartu
- 1936: Põnevusnovelle (An Exciting Short Story). Tallinn: Olion kirjastus
- 1937: Kuldnööp (The Gold Button). Tallinn: Uus Eesti
- 1937: Lihtne loomake (A Simple Creature). Tallinn: Autoriõiguste ühingu kirjastus
- 1986: Luuletusi (Poems). Los Angeles: author (posthumous)

== Personal life ==
In 1921, Naelapea married Alice Rosalie Ojanson (1899–1999), a philologist of Romance languages. They had three children.
