= Waldemar =

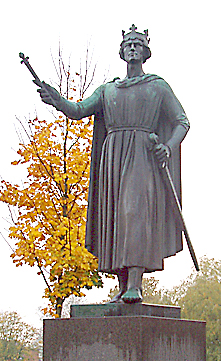
- Valdemar I of Denmark
- Gender: masculine

Origin
- Origin: Germanic
- Meaning: "power"+"fame"; "powerful and famous", "brightness"+"fame"; "bright and famous"

Other names
- Alternative spelling: Valdemar, Waldomar, Waldek
- Variant forms: Valdamarr, Valdemārs, Valdimar, Voldemārs, Valdis, Voldemar, Woldemar
- Related names: Vladimir, Volodymyr
- See also: Robert (name with a similar meaning)

Waldemar, Valdemar, Valdimar, or Woldemar is an Old High German given name. It consists of the elements wald- "power", "brightness" and -mar "fame".

The name is considered the equivalent of the Latvian name Valdemārs, the Estonian name Voldemar, and the Slavic names Vladimir, Volodymyr, Uladzimir or Włodzimierz.

The Old Norse form Valdamarr (also Valdarr) occurs in the Guðrúnarkviða II as the name of a king of the Danes. The Old Norse form is also used in Heimskringla, in the story of Harald Hardrada, as the name of a ruler of Holmgard (Veliky Novgorod). The Fagrskinna kings' sagas also have Valdamarr, in reference to both Vladimir the Great and Vladimir Yaroslavovich.

People with the name include:

== Royalty ==
Ordered chronologically

- Valdemar I of Denmark or Waldemar the Great (1131–1182), King of Denmark
- Valdemar of Denmark (bishop) (1157/1158–1235 or 1236), posthumous illegitimate son of King Canute V of Denmark
- Valdemar II of Denmark or Waldemar the Victorious (1170–1241), King of Denmark, one of the principal commanders of the Livonian Crusade
- Valdemar the Young (1209–1231)
- Valdemar, King of Sweden (1239–1302)
- Waldemar, Margrave of Brandenburg-Stendal or Waldemar the Great (c. 1280–1319)

- False Waldemar (died 1356), an imposter who claimed to be Waldemar the Great

- Valdemar, Duke of Finland (c. 1282–1318)
- Valdemar III of Denmark (1314–1364)
- Waldemar I, Prince of Anhalt-Zerbst (died 1368)
- Waldemar II, Prince of Anhalt-Zerbst (died 1371)
- Valdemar IV of Denmark (c. 1320–1375)
- Waldemar III, Prince of Anhalt-Zerbst (died 1391)
- Prince Valdemar of Denmark (1858–1939)
- Prince Waldemar of Prussia (1868–1879), son of Emperor Frederick III
- Prince Waldemar of Prussia (1889–1945), son of Prince Henry and nephew of the above
- Prince Waldemar of Schaumburg-Lippe (1940–2020)
- Woldemar, Prince of Lippe (1824–1895)

== Others ==
=== A–F ===
- Waldemar Ager (1869–1941), Norwegian-American newspaperman and author
- Waldemar Anton (born 1996), Uzbekistani-born German footballer
- Waldemar Aspelin (1854–1923), Finnish architect
- Woldemar Bargiel (1828–1897), German composer
- Waldemar Bastos (1954–2020), Angolan musician
- Waldemar Baszanowski (1935–2011), Polish weightlifter
- Waldemar Bonsels (1880–1952), German writer
- Waldemar Borges (1958–2026), Brazilian politician
- Waldemar Caerel Hunter (1919–1968), Indonesian actor
- Waldemar Christofer Brøgger (geologist) (1851–1940), Norwegian geologist
- Waldemar Christofer Brøgger (writer) (1911–1991), Norwegian writer
- Valdemar Costa Neto (born 1949), Brazilian politician
- Waldemar Cerrón (born 1972), Peruvian politician
- Waldemar Cierpinski (born 1950), East German athlete
- Waldemar Dalenogare Neto (born 1991), Brazilian scholar and film critic
- Waldemar Erfurth (1879–1971), German general

=== G–N ===
- Waldemar Haffkine (1860–1930), Ukrainian bacteriologist
- Woldemar Hägglund (1893–1963), Finnish major general during World War II
- Waldemar Hansteen (1857–1921), Norwegian architect
- Waldemar Hoven (1903–1948), German Nazi physician involved in Nazi euthanasia programs, executed for war crimes
- Waldemar Hvoslef (1825–1906), Norwegian Lutheran bishop
- Waldemar Januszczak (born 1956), British art critic
- Woldemar Kernig (1840–1917), Russian and Baltic German internist and neurologist whose medical discoveries saved thousands of people with meningitis
- Waldemar Klingelhöfer (1900–1980), German Nazi SS-Sturmbannführer (Major) and convicted war criminal
- Waldemar Kophamel (1880–1934), German U-boat commanding officer in the Imperial German Navy during World War I
- Waldemar Legień (born 1963), Polish judoka
- Waldemar Lemos (born 1954), Brazilian football (soccer) manager
- Waldemar Levy Cardoso (1900–2009), field marshal of the Brazilian Army
- Waldemar Lindgren (1860–1939), Swedish-American geologist, one of the founders of modern economic geology
- Woldemar von Löwendal (1700–1755), German military officer
- Waldemar Łysiak (born 1944), Polish writer
- Waldemar Maciszewski (1927–1956), Polish pianist and composer
- Waldemar Matuška (1932–2009), Czechoslovak singer
- Waldemar Milewicz (1956–2004), Polish journalist

=== N–Z ===
- Waldemar Olszewski (1931–2020), Polish lymphologist
- Waldemar Pabst (1880–1970), German soldier and political activist, one of the principal commanders of the German Revolution of 1918–1919
- Waldemar Pawlak (born 1959), Polish politician
- Valdemar Poulsen (1869–1942), Danish inventor
- Waldemar Prusik (born 1961), Polish footballer
- Waldemar Sorychta (born 1967), German heavy metal musician and record producer
- Waldemar Starosta (born 1961), Polish politician
- Waldemar Thrane (1790–1828), Norwegian composer, violinist and conductor
- Waldemar Verner (1914–1982), chief of the East German Volksmarine (People's Navy)
- Waldemar Victorino (1952–2023), Uruguayan football player
- Woldemar Voigt (1850–1919), German physician
- Waldemar Caerel Hunter (1919–1968), Indonesian actor
- Waldemar Witkowski (born 1953), Polish politician
- Waldemar Wilenius (1868–1940), Finnish architect
- Waldemar Young (1878–1938), American screenwriter

== As a surname ==
- Edith Waldemar Leverton (1868–1955), English writer and editor
