= Valdas =

- Gender: Male
- Language: Lithuanian

Origin
- Region of origin: Lithuania

Other names
- Related names: Valdemaras

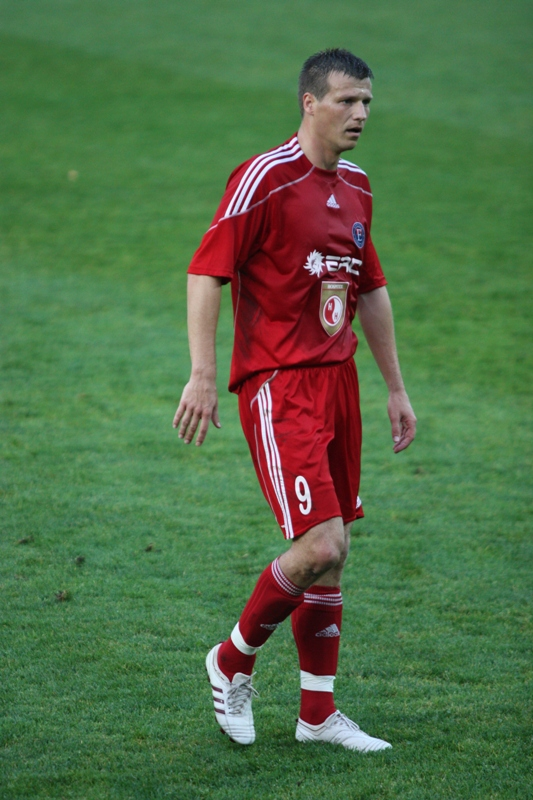
Valdas Trakys

Valdas is a Lithuanian masculine given name. It is the shortened form of Valdemaras and other Lithuanian names containing the Germanic or Baltic element "wald" ("rule"). Individuals with the name Valdas include:

- Valdas Adamkus (born 1926), Lithuanian politician, former President of Lithuania
- Valdas Dabkus (born 1984), Lithuanian basketball player
- Valdas Dambrauskas (born 1977), Lithuanian football manager
- Valdas Dopolskas (born 1992) Lithuanian marathon runner
- Valdas Ivanauskas (born 1966), Lithuanian footballer
- Valdas Kasparavičius (born 1958), Lithuanian footballer
- Valdas Kazlauskas (born 1958), Lithuanian racewalker
- Valdas Trakys (born 1979), Lithuanian footballer
- Valdas Urbonas (born 1967), Lithuanian footballer
- Valdas Vasylius (born 1983), Lithuanian basketball player
