= Voldemārs =

Male given name

- Gender: Male
- Name day: 11 December

Origin
- Meaning: "famous ruler"
- Region of origin: Latvia

Other names
- Related names: Valdis, Valdemārs, Voldemar, Waldemar, Woldemar, Vladimir

Voldemārs is a Latvian masculine given name. It is a cognate of the Germanic "Waldemar".

Voldemārs may refer to:

- Voldemārs Elmūts (1910–1966), Latvian basketball player
- Voldemārs Lūsis (born 1974), Latvian athlete, javelin thrower, Olympic competitor
- Voldemārs Mežgailis (1912-1998), Latvian chess master
- Voldemārs Ozols (1884-1949), Latvian military commander, military theorist and politician
- Voldemārs Plade (1900-????), Latvian football forward and football manager
- Voldemārs Reinholds (1903-1986), Latvian Waffen SS soldier
- Voldemārs Sudmalis (1922-1990,) Latvian football defender
- Voldemārs Veiss (1899-1944), Latvian soldier and Nazi collaborator
- Voldemārs Vītols (1911–1980), Latvian middle-distance runner
- Voldemārs Zāmuēls (1872-1948), Latvian politician, former Prime Minister of Latvia
- Voldemārs Žins (1905-????), Latvian footballer
