= Kiviküla, Valga County =

Village in Estonia

- Village
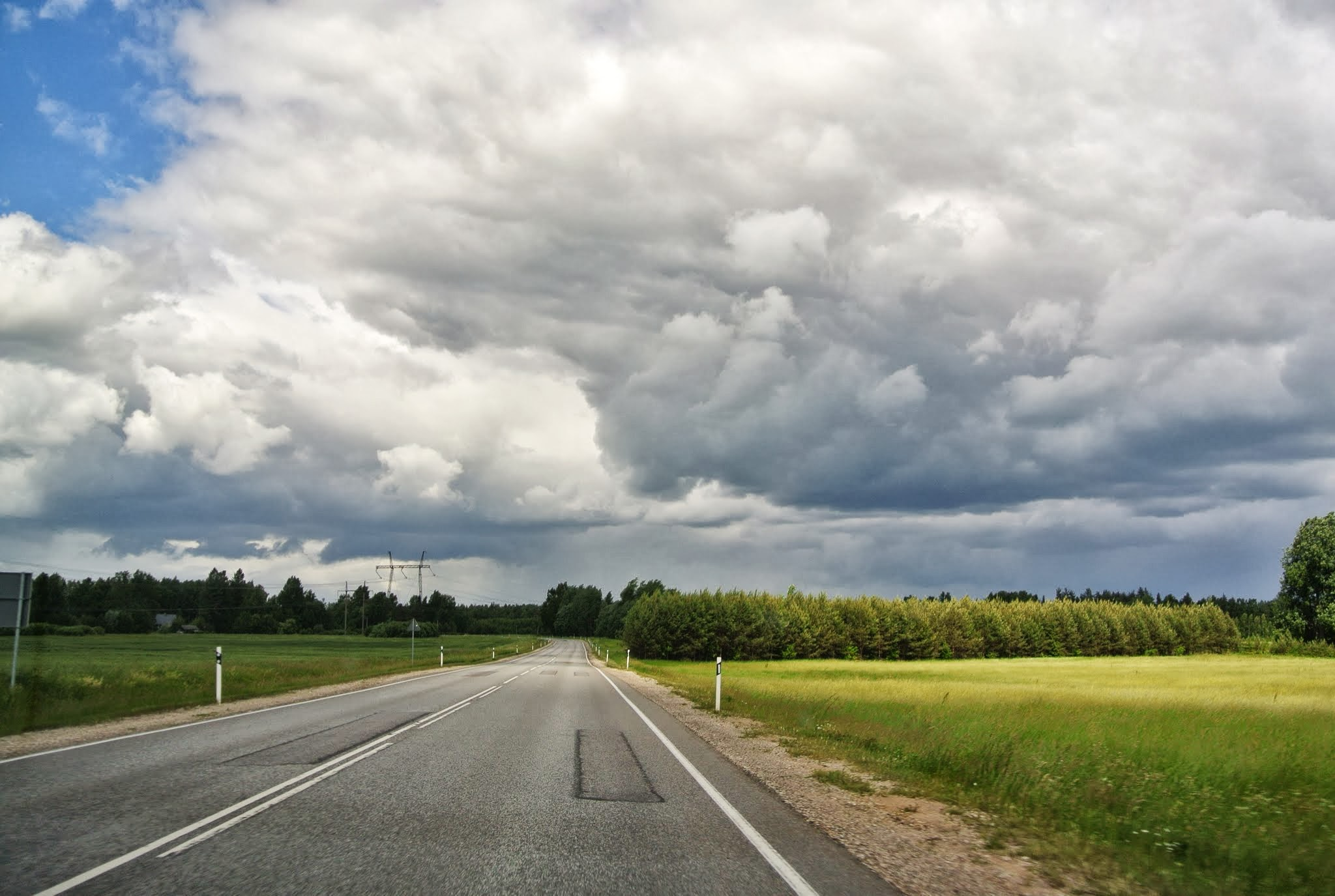
- Tartu-Valga road through Kiviküla

- Location within Estonia
- Coordinates: 57.960833333333°N 26.128611111111°E
- Country: Estonia
- County: Valga County
- Parish: Valga Parish
- Time zone: UTC+2 (EET)
  - Summer (DST): UTC+3 (EEST)

Kiviküla is a village in Valga Parish, Valga County in Estonia.

== Notable people ==
Notable people that were born or lived in Kiviküla include:

- Alide Ertel (1877–1955), writer
