= Alide Ertel =

Estonian writer (1877-1955)

- Born: July 25, 1877 Kiviküla, Governorate of Livonia, Russian Empire
- Died: 20 December 1955 (aged 78) Arula, then part of Estonian SSR, Soviet Union
- Occupation: Writer
- Language: Estonian
- Genre: Novel; short story; play

Alide Ertel (also Aliide Ertel; pseudonyms E. Tammistu and Heiti Lehtme, July 25 [O.S. July 13] 1877 – December 20, 1955) was an Estonian prose writer, playwright, and poet.

== Life ==
Alide Ertel was born in Kiviküla in the Governorate of Livonia in the Russian Empire. She graduated from the Salomon Higher School for Girls in Tartu in 1893 as a private school teacher. From 1894 to 1896, she operated a small private school at her father's farm. From 1896 to 1899, she worked as a private school teacher in the Kostroma Governorate in Russia. She spent 1899 to 1900 in Paris, where she originally wanted to study medicine, but her plans fell through. She then worked alternately in agriculture and education in Estonia, and at the time of the Russian Revolution of 1905 she traveled to Finland and Germany. From 1911 to 1914 she worked again as a private tutor, this time in Moscow.

In 1914 she returned to Estonia and became the director of a primary school in Otepää Parish. From 1921 to 1925 she was a teacher in Pärnu and then for two years in Kärdla on Hiiumaa. She later lived in Tartu, Pärnu, and Tallinn before moving to Elva in the late 1930s. She spent her last years in Arula, where she also died.

== Work ==
Ertel began her literary activity at the end of the 19th century, when her texts appeared in various daily newspapers. Her book debut came in 1910 with the story Rooste (Rust), which describes the miserable life in a poorhouse. She also often dealt with social issues and marginalized social groups in her other works. However, whereas Rooste was positively received by critics, the later works received much more reserved reviews.

== Bibliography ==
- Rooste (Rust). In: Postimees, Tartu, 1910. 99 pp.
- Allegooriad (Allegories). Tartu, 1919. 72 pp.
- Kiirte pärg. Muinasdraam (A Wreath of Rays. An Ancient Drama). Tartu, 1919. 84 pp.
- Lilla lehekesed. Ajalooline romaan (Purple Leaflets. A Historical Novel). Tartu, 1919. 124 pp.
- Pühajärv. Muinasdraam (Sacred Lake. An Ancient Drama). Tartu, 1919. 60 pp.
- Moodne daam. Kolm novelli (The Modern Lady. Three Short Stories). Tartu, 1919. 87 pp.
- Muinelmad (Memories). Tartu, 1929. 32 pp.
