= Guðrún Valgerður Stefánsdóttir =

Icelandic academic

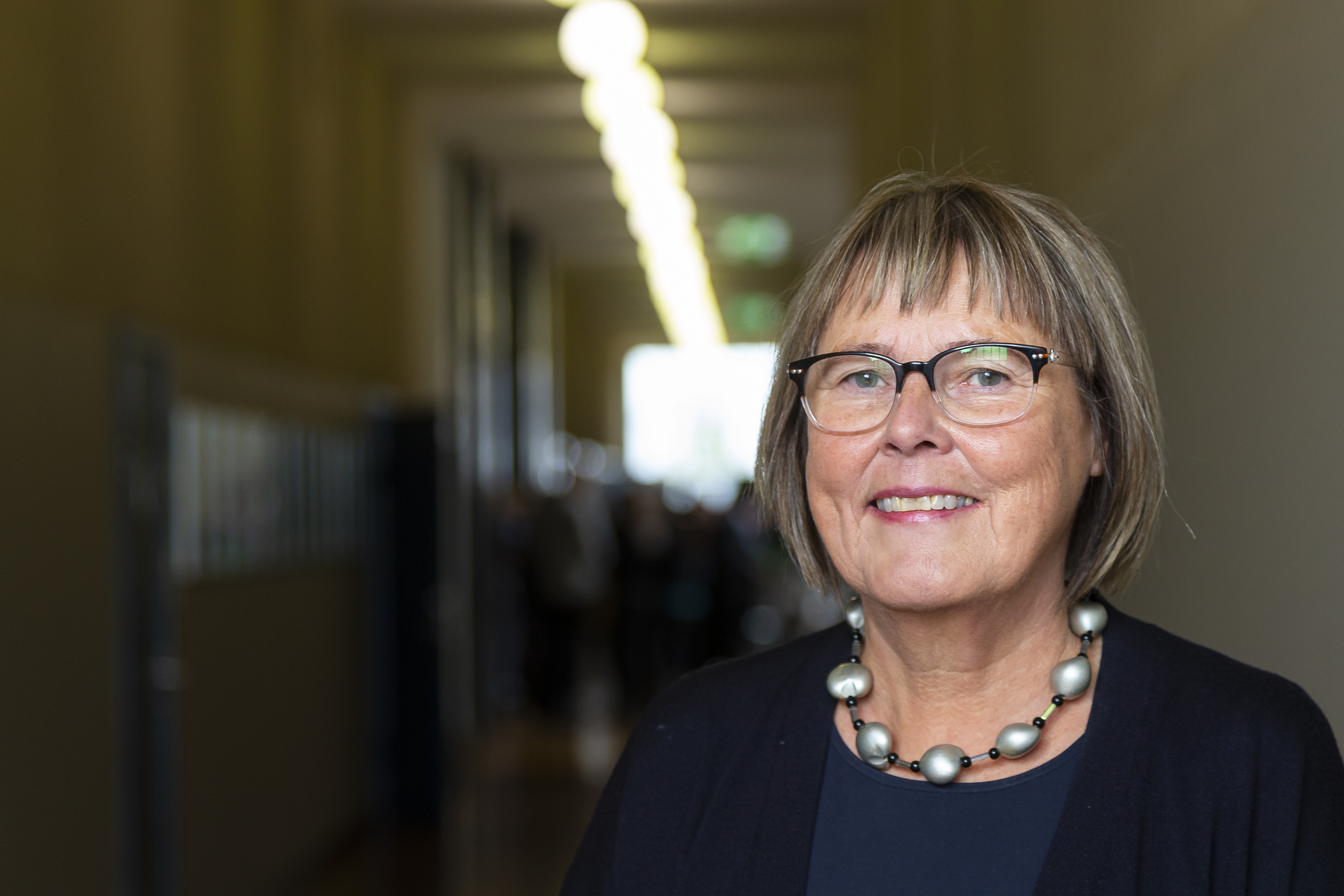
- Occupation: professor disability studies at the University of Iceland

Guðrún Valgerður Stefánsdóttir is a professor in disability studies at the School of Education of the University of Iceland.

== Professional experience ==
Guðrún Valgerður Stefánsdóttir graduated from Iceland's Social Pedagogue School in 1976, completed special pedagogue education from the University of Oslo in 1983 and Teacher Certification from the Iceland University of Education in 1991. She completed a master's from Iceland University of Education in 1998 and a Ph.D. in Disability Studies from the University of Iceland's Faculty of Social Sciences in 2008. Before Guðrún began her academic career, she worked with disabled people, as both a social pedagogue and special teacher. She started teaching at the Social Pedagogue School of Iceland in 1989. In 1998, Iceland University of Education (now the School of Education at the University of Iceland) hired her as assistant professor. Guðrún is now a professor in disability studies in the School of Education at the University of Iceland.

== Research ==
Guðrún has written many articles, chapters in books, and books. Her research has been in the field of disability studies. Her research has specifically related to the life circumstances of people with intellectual disabilities. Especially worth noting are her life history studies and historical research. Guðrún has specialised in inclusive research and worked closely with disabled people in research. In addition, she has been doing research on autonomy and people with intellectual disabilities and educational research on university education for people with intellectual disabilities.

Guðrún has participated in Icelandic and international research projects related to her field of study. One example is the interdisciplinary research project "Disability before Disability." In 2017, it received a three-year incentive grant from The Icelandic Research Fund. The project builds on interdisciplinary collaboration of scholars in many fields of study who focus on the history of disabled people in Iceland's past. In addition, she participated in the Grundtvig Project on adult education (2005 to 2008). The project's title is Empowerment and disability: Informal learning through self advocacy and life history. The collaborators were five universities in Europe: The Open University in United Kingdom, Trinity College Dublin in Ireland, the University of Ghent in Belgium, and the University of Iceland. In addition to university teachers, a group of people with intellectual disabilities in each country, participated in the project.

== Acknowledgements ==
In 2008, Guðrún received from the National Association of Intellectual Disabilities' the Múrbrjót (Wall Breaker) Award for her life history research on disabled people.

== Other work and projects ==
Guðrún has served in various positions of confidentiality at the University of Iceland and outside it. Examples include her participation on the editorial board of the journal Uppeldi og menntun (Icelandic Journal of Education). She was one of its two editors during the four-year period from 2013 to 2016. In addition, she has been director of the social pedagogue programme and participated in developing undergraduate and graduate curriculums for social pedagogues. She was also a member of the Doctoral Programme Committee of the School of Education for several electoral terms and participated in developing the School's doctoral curriculum. In addition, she was one of the initiators of university studies for people with intellectual disabilities and has participated in international cooperation in that context. The curriculum has won various awards, including the Múrbrjót of the National Association of Intellectual Disabilities and the Incentive Award of the Icelandic Disability Alliance in 2014. In addition, she has been on faculty councils, first at the Icelandic University of Education. However, after unification of IUE and the University of Iceland, she has been a member of the Faculty Council of the Sports, Leisure Activities and Social Pedagogues Division. Since 2018, she has been a member of the Faculty Council's Division of Education and Diversity, and she is now its reserve director.

Guðrún has also successfully collaborated in the field of disabled people and sat as the University of Iceland's representative on various governmental committees. Among other things, she was a member of a committee under the auspices of the Office of the Prime Minister. Its purpose was to investigate children's living conditions at the Kópavogshæli, institute for people with intellectual disability.

== Main written works ==
=== Articles ===
- Stefánsdóttir, G., Björnsdóttir, K. and Stefánsdóttir, Á. (2018). Autonomy and people with intellectual disabilities who require more intensive support. Scandinavian Journal of Disability Research. 20(1), pp. 162–171.
- Björnsdóttir, K., Stefánsdóttir, Á. and Stefánsdóttir, G.V. (2017). People with intellectual disabilities negotiate autonomy, gender and sexuality. Sexuality and Disability, 35(3), 295–311.
- Stefánsdóttir, G.V. and Björnsdóttir, K. (2016). ´I am að college student‘ postsecondary education for people with intellectual disabilities. Scandinavian Journal of Disability research.
- Stefánsdóttir, G.V. and Traustadóttir, R. (2015). Lifehistories as counter – narratives against dominant and negative stereotypes about people with intellectual disabilities. Disability & Society, 30(3), 368–380.
- Stefánsdóttir, G.V. (2014). Sterilisation and women with intellectual disability in Iceland. Journal of Intellectual and Developmental disability, 39(2), 188–197.
- Björnsdóttir, K., Stefánsdóttir, G.V and Stefánsdóttir, Á. (2015). ´It is my life‘: Autonomy and people with intellectual disabilities. Journal of Intellectual disabilities, 19(1), 5–21.
- G.V. and Hreinsdóttir, E.E.(2013). Sterilisation, intellectual disability, and some ethical and methodological challenges: It shouldn't be a secret. Ethics and Social Welfare, 7(3), 302–308.
- Hreinsdóttir, E.E. og Stefánsdóttir, G.V. (2010). Collaborative life history: different experiences of spending time in an institution in Iceland. British Journal of Learning Disabilities, 38(2), 103– 110.
- Hreinsdóttir, E.B., Stefánsdóttir, G., Lewthwaite, A., Ledger S. og Shufflebotham, L. (2006). Is my story so different from yours? Comparing life stories, experiences of institutionalization and self‐advocacy in England and Iceland. British Journal of Learning Disabilities, 34(3), 157–167.

=== Books ===
- María Hreiðarsdóttir og Guðrún V. Stefánsdóttir. (2017)., Ég lifði í þögninni“ Lífssaga Maríu Þ. Hreiðarsdóttir (Life-history of María Hreiðarsdóttir). Reykjavík: Bókaútgáfan Draumórar.
