= Bergstadt =

Bergstadt is German and means "mining town". It may also refer to the following places:

- Leśnica, the former German town of Bergstadt, now in Poland
- Clausthal-Zellerfeld, known officially as Bergstadt Clausthal-Zellerfeld, a mining town in the Harz mountains of Germany
