= Miervaldis Drāznieks =

Latvian footballer

Personal information
- Position: Forward

Senior career*
Years	Team	Apps	(Gls)
1947–1948	Daugava		
1949–1960	Sarkanais Metalurgs		

International career
–1958	Latvia		
- * Club domestic league appearances and goals

Miervaldis Drāznieks was a Latvian footballer, one of the all-time best goal scorers in the Latvian league.

Almost for the entire his career Drāznieks played in Liepāja scoring 160 goals in the Latvian league. In his first match in the Latvian league in 1947 Drāznieks scored four goals. With Liepājas Metalurgs he won the Latvian league eight times, the Latvian Cup five times. In 1955 Drāznieks played with Daugava Rīga in the 1st Soviet league and scored four goals.

Together with Ernests Ziņģis Drāznieks was one of the best forwards in the post-war Liepāja. Still with all his 160 goals Drāznieks was known as a waster of good scoring opportunities – he had a great ability to be in the right place to score goals but lacked speed and very often missed superb scoring chances. Drāznieks retired from football in 1960.
