= Visvaldis (given name) =

Male given name

- Gender: Male
- Name day: 24 April

Origin
- Meaning: All-ruler
- Region of origin: Latvia

Other names
- Related names: Visvaldas, Valdis

Visvaldis is a Latvian masculine given name. A diminutive form of Visvaldis is Valdis. People bearing the name Visvaldis include:

- Visvaldis (fl. 13th-century), Latgalian nobleman
- Visvaldis Ignatāns (born 1991), Latvian footballer
- Visvaldis Melderis (1915–1944), Latvian basketball player
- Visvaldis Georgs Nagobads (1921–2023), Latvian-born American physician
