= Aleksei Bobrov (footballer, born 1973) =

Russian footballer

Personal information
- Full name: Aleksei Olegovich Bobrov
- Date of birth: 25 June 1973 (age 53)
- Place of birth: Leningrad, Russian SFSR
- Height: 1.73 m (5 ft 8 in)
- Position: Midfielder

Youth career
- Zvezda Leningrad
- FC Zenit Leningrad

Senior career*
Years	Team	Apps	(Gls)
1992	FC Kosmos-Kirovets Saint Petersburg	38	(0)
1993–1997	FC Zenit Saint Petersburg	73	(3)
1994–1997	→ FC Zenit-d Saint Petersburg	25	(2)
1998	FC Lokomotiv Saint Petersburg	8	(0)
1998	FC Irtysh Omsk	20	(5)
1999	FC Rubin Kazan	40	(4)
2000	FC Torpedo-ZIL Moscow	4	(0)
2001	FC SKA Saint Petersburg (amateur)		
2002	FK Liepājas Metalurgs	2	(0)
2002–2004	FC Petrotrest Saint Petersburg	72	(4)
2005	FC Dynamo Vologda	6	(1)
2007	FC Lipton Saint Petersburg		
- * Club domestic league appearances and goals

Aleksei Olegovich Bobrov (Russian: Алексей Олегович Бобров; born 25 June 1973) is a former Russian football player.
