= Liepājas Metalurgs (company) =

Latvian steel company

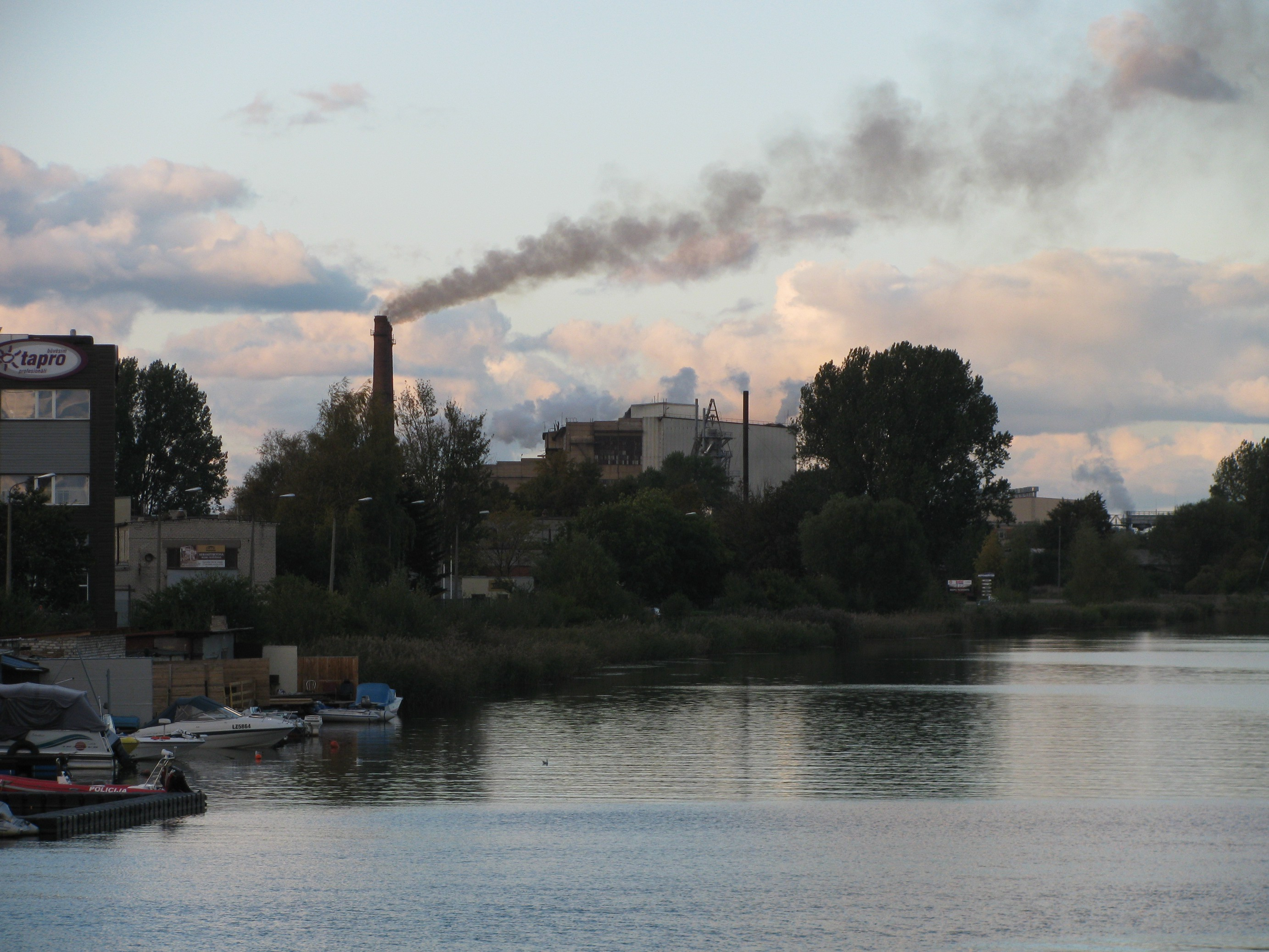
- Native name: AS "Liepājas Metalurgs"
- Company type: Joint-stock company
- Industry: Steel
- Founded: 1882 (industrial predecessor)
- Defunct: 19 February 2021
- Fate: Liquidated after insolvency proceedings
- Headquarters: Liepāja, Latvia
- Products: Rolled steel, wire, nails and metal products

Liepājas Metalurgs was a Latvian steel company based in Liepāja. Its industrial predecessor was the Boecker & Co factory, which began construction in Jaunliepāja in 1882 and later became known as Sarkanais Metalurgs and Liepājas Metalurgs. Before its insolvency, it was described by Reuters as Latvia's biggest industrial plant and the only rolled steel maker in the Baltic states.

The company entered insolvency proceedings in November 2013 after financial difficulties and failure to repay a state-guaranteed loan. Its assets were sold in 2014 to the Ukrainian KVV Group, which renamed the plant KVV Liepājas Metalurgs and reopened it in March 2015. The successor company was declared insolvent in 2016, and the original AS Liepājas Metalurgs was liquidated in 2021.

== History and operations ==
The origins of the enterprise are usually traced to 28 September 1882, when a German group led by father and son Boecker began building a puddling, rolling, wire and nail factory in Jaunliepāja. The factory was later known locally as the Boecker factory or nail and wire factory, during the Soviet period as Sarkanais Metalurgs, and finally as Liepājas Metalurgs. Its production grew in the late nineteenth and early twentieth centuries; by 1908 the factory employed about 1,900 workers.

In the 2000s and early 2010s, Liepājas Metalurgs operated as a metallurgical company producing steel products including reinforcing bars, long products, drawn wire and nails. The company launched a new electric furnace workshop in 2011, and Capital.ua reported that in 2012 the furnace output reached its designed level of about 850,000 tonnes per year.

Independent business media described the company as economically significant for both Latvia and Liepāja. The Baltic Times, citing an audit report, wrote in April 2013 that the company was among Latvia's largest taxpayers and exporters, employed about six percent of Liepāja's economically active residents, and accounted for more than 62 percent of the city's manufacturing output. Eurofound later recorded that the company employed more than 1,870 people at the time of the 2013 restructuring event and was one of Latvia's largest companies and the largest job provider in Liepāja.

== Financial difficulties and insolvency ==
By 2013, Liepājas Metalurgs was facing severe financial pressure. The Baltic Times reported that Ernst & Young had projected a major funding shortfall and that the company had negative working capital, large debt obligations and electricity debts to Latvenergo. A later BNN report, citing government consultants and Latvian Television's De facto, estimated that the bankruptcy could cost the Latvian state about LVL 230–250 million, including the state payment of a loan to UniCredit Bank on behalf of the company.

The Liepāja Court opened insolvency proceedings against Liepājas Metalurgs in November 2013 and halted the company's legal protection process. According to The Baltic Times, production had stopped and the Latvian State Treasury had repaid €67,465,056 of a loan owed to UniCredit from the state budget. LSM later summarized that more than 1,000 people were laid off and that the government repaid a €67 million loan after the company became insolvent.

== Sale to KVV Group ==
In September 2014, Ukraine's KVV Group was selected as the buyer of the insolvent steelworks. The Baltic Times reported that KVV offered €107 million and that Latvia's government had welcomed the offer after repaying a loan guarantee to UniCredit. The sale agreement was signed on 2 October 2014 between the insolvency administrator and KVV Group. At the time, the buyer said that the first stage of resumed production would use two shifts, produce 35,000 tonnes per month and require about 500 workers.

The plant was renamed KVV Liepājas Metalurgs and officially reopened on 6 March 2015. In 2015, The Baltic Course wrote that the former Liepājas Metalurgs had been one of the largest industrial companies in the Baltic states, one of Latvia's largest exporters, and had accounted for about 0.7–1 percent of Latvian gross domestic product.

== Later insolvency, asset sales and liquidation ==
The reopened company soon encountered new difficulties. LSM reported in 2020 that KVV Liepājas Metalurgs was declared insolvent in September 2016 after problems following the reopening. The Baltic Course reported in 2017 that creditor claims against KVV Liepājas Metalurgs exceeded €116 million and that the steel plant owed €65 million to the Latvian state.

In January 2018, LSM reported that the assets of insolvent KVV Liepājas Metalurgs would be sold off in parts at auction after potential investors failed to provide the guarantees needed to acquire and restart the company as a whole. In March 2018, Baltic News Network reported that Austrian company Smart Stahl GmbH won an auction for rolling mill equipment from KVV Liepājas Metalurgs.

The original insolvent AS Liepājas Metalurgs was liquidated on 19 February 2021, after the Kurzeme District Court ended the insolvency process on 10 February 2021 because the creditor-claims recovery plan had been completed. LETA reported that during the insolvency process, more than €115 million was recovered from the sale and recovery of assets, while uncovered creditor claims after the process ended amounted to €118,113,832.96.

== Legacy ==
In the early 2020s, the former steelworks territory was discussed as a site for industrial-park development. In 2023, the Investment and Development Agency of Latvia reported, based on Latvian Radio, that the former Liepājas Metalurgs territory was planned to be transformed into a new street network and industrial area.
