= Valdimar =

Valdimar is a given name in Icelandic. Notable persons with that name include:

- Valdimar Ásmundsson (1852–1902), Icelandic translator
- Valdimar Bergstað (born 1989), Icelandic equestrian
- Valdemar, King of Sweden (1239–1302), king in 1250–1275 (in Icelandic Valdimar Birgisson)
- Kristjan Valdimar Bjornson (1906–1987), American politician, commonly known as Val Bjornson
- Valdimar Briem (1848–1930), Icelandic bishop
- Valdimar Grímsson (born 1965), Icelandic handball player
- Valdimar Tr. Hafstein (born 1972), Icelandic folklorist
- Valdimar Þór Ingimundarson (born 1999), Icelandic footballer
- Valdimar Jóhannsson (born 1978), Icelandic filmmaker
- Valdimar Kristófersson (born 1970), Icelandic footballer
- Valdimar Tómasson (born 1971), Icelandic poet

== See also ==
- Valdimarsson
- Waldemar (disambiguation) / Valdemar
