= Voldemārs Sudmalis =

Latvian footballer (1922–1990)

Voldemārs Sudmalis (1922–1990) was a Latvian football defender, one of the most popular post-war footballers from Liepāja. Sudmalis is considered the most skillful footballer in the history of Liepāja, he had good speed, tactical strength and played well with the head.

== Biography ==
Sudmalis started his career in Liepāja where he played with Olimpija Liepāja from 1942 to 1944. After World War II when Olimpija was reformed as Daugava Liepāja Sudmalis at first stayed with the club but in 1946 he was called up to Riga to join FK Dinamo Rīga which played in the Soviet league. From 1946 to 1948 he played with Dinamo in the first Soviet league but in 1949 as it was merged with Daugava Rīga and promoted to the Soviet Top League Sudmalis became a footballer for Daugava.

Over four seasons Sudmalis played 87 matches in the top Soviet league with Daugava and scored 1 goal. After the 1952 Daugava got relegated to the 1st Soviet league again, after one more season (with 9 appearances for Daugava) Sudmalis returned to Liepāja where he joined Liepājas Metalurgs (former Daugava Liepāja). Sudmalis played with Sarkanais Metalurgs until 1959 when the club earned promotion to the second Soviet league, over these years winning the Latvian league title five times and the Latvian Cup two times.

After retiring from football Sudmalis worked in the Sarkanais Metalurgs metallurgy factory. He died at the age of 68 in the autumn of 1990.
