= Valdis Pultraks =

Latvian footballer

Valdis Pultraks (1922–1972) was a Latvian football goalkeeper. He played for FC Riga Daugava and is considered one of the best Latvian goalkeepers in history.

== Early life ==
At the age of 14 Pultraks had already played for FK Ausma from Auce in the Latvian Cup quarterfinals.

== Career ==
Until the mid-1940s in addition to football Pultraks actively participated in athletics events - even in 1947 when he already played for FK Dinamo Rīga he won the bronze medal at the Latvian athletics championship in 100 meter run. His first professional football team was Daugava Liepāja in 1946 from which he moved to Dinamo Rīga and when Dinamo was merged with Daugava Rīga - Pultraks became goalkeeper with the best football club in Latvia. In the Soviet elite league Pultraks had a strong competition for the number one goalkeeper position in Daugava. However when in 1952 Daugava was relegated from the top league, Pultraks left the club. Pultraks later played with Sarkanais metalurgs Liepāja.

At the age of 36, he played for Daugava in their first postwar international match in Latvia, against Swedish club IK Sture.

== Personal life and death ==
His wife Nellija was a national record holder in swimming. Their son Pēteris Pultraks became a surgeon.

Valdis Pultraks died at 50.
