= Council for Foreign and Security Policy =

Ukrainian think tank

The Council for Foreign and Security Policy (abbr. CFSP, Ukrainian: Рада із зовнішньої та безпекової політики) is a non-governmental research organization focusing on the Ukrainian national and foreign security policy to develop well-grounded recommendations for the current government of Ukraine, non-governmental associations, as well as foreign states and societies. The CFSP was established on 15 December 2009 in Kyiv.

== Members ==
The Council brings together Ukrainian national security and foreign policy experts. The CFSP's Head is Volodymyr Horbulin, former Secretary of the National Security and Defense Council of Ukraine, member of the National Academy of Sciences of Ukraine. Other CFSP members include:

- Oleksandr V. Lytvynenko, Dr. of Political Sciences;
- Victor V. Zamiatin, Honoured Journalist of Ukraine, editor.

== Activity ==
The CFSP's mission is ensuring social democratic development of Ukraine as an important European state. Its key activities and tasks cover:

- assistance with arrangement and delivery of analytical and scientific research on the foreign policy and Ukraine's national security;
- rallying of the Ukrainian expert community for foreign and security policy;
- analytical-expert and scientific forecasting support to foreign and security policy solutions;
- elaboration and specialized expertise of draft foreign and security policy regulations;
- improvement of the professional level of Ukrainian experts and specialists in foreign and security policy, extension of respective knowledge to wide public through organization and conduction of conferences, round tables, workshops, summer and winter courses, trainings and other public events, speeches in mass media;
- encouragement of the democratic civil control over activity of state agencies developing and implementing foreign and security policy;
- establishing and maintaining international contacts with expert communities for foreign and security policy of other states;
- publishing activity.

The first large-scale project of the Council for Foreign and Security Policy is the International Security Forum "From Ukrainian Security to European Security. 21st Century Challenges" which was held in Lviv on 15–16 April 2010.

== Publications ==
Reinvigorating the Ukrainian Republic, Volodymyr Horbulin, 2 February 2010, Business Ukraine Online

European Security: Possible Way to Mitigate Challenges and Threats, Volodymyr Horbulin, Oleksandr Lytvynenko, Dzerkalo Tyzhnia newspaper, No. 43 (771) 7–13 November 2009, English translation – CFSP web-site
