= Voldemar Ojansoon =

Estonian lawyer and diplomat (1897–1942)

- Born: August 20, 1897; Pataste Manor, Tartu County, Estonia
- Died: 1942 (aged 44–45); Saratov, USSR
- Education: University of Tartu
- Occupations: Lawyer and diplomat
- Relatives: Yri Naelapea

Voldemar Ojansoon (until 1935 Voldemar Ojanson; August 20, 1897 – 1942) was an Estonian lawyer and diplomat.

== Early life and education ==
Voldemar Ojansoon was born at Pataste Manor in Tartu Parish, Estonia, the son of Kristjan Ojanson (1872–1910) and Karoline Ojanson (née Feldmann, 1878–?). After graduating from Tartu Alexander High School, he attended the University of Tartu's Faculty of Medicine in 1917 and the Faculty of Law from 1917 to 1923.

Ojansoon was a member of the Estonian student organization Korporatsioon Sakala. He served in the Estonian War of Independence as a staff writer for the 2nd Division.

== Career ==
In 1923, Ojansoon became an attaché at the Estonian embassy in Berlin. He then served as the second secretary at the embassy in Stockholm (from May 1, 1924), the deputy consul at the Copenhagen consulate (from April 1, 1926), the second secretary at the embassy in London (from November 1, 1926), the first secretary at the Ministry of Foreign Affairs (from January 8, 1934), the head of the consular office (from January 7, 1935), the head of the office for the League of Nations (from January 1, 1936), the head of the office of the political department (from January 15, 1937), and a counselor at the Moscow embassy (from July 1, 1938 to August 26, 1940).

The Estonian embassy in Moscow operated until August 1940. After the June 1940 Soviet invasion and occupation of Estonia, the envoy August Rei escaped from the Soviet Union through Riga to Sweden. The embassy was liquidated, and its assets were transferred to the NKVD. The Ministry of Foreign Affairs ordered Ojansoon to return to Estonia, which he did, traveling by train to Tallinn with his wife Margit. They hoped that they had thus escaped danger, but after reaching Tallinn Ojansoon was arrested by the NKVD. After interrogating him, the Soviet authorities sentenced Ojansoon under the laws of the RSFSR. Ojansoon died in captivity in Russia, but the exact time and place of death are unknown. Margit Ojansoon escaped to England during the war, where she later died.

== Family ==
Ojansoon was married to Margit (a.k.a. Margarethe) née Peterson (1899–1976). He was the brother-in-law of the writer Yri Naelapea, who was married to Alice Rosalie Ojanson (1899–1999).

== Awards and recognitions ==
- Order of the Cross of the Eagle, 4th Class (1936)
- Order of Polonia Restituta, 3rd class
- Order of the Three Stars of Latvia, 3rd class
- Order of Vytautas the Great of Lithuania, 3rd class
- Order of Merit of the Kingdom of Hungary, Commander (1939)
