= Woldemar =

Woldemar is a given name, a variant of Waldemar.

Notable people with the name include:

- Woldemar Bargiel (1828–1897), German composer of classical music
- Woldemar Brinkmann (1890–1959), German architect and interior designer associated with Nazi architecture
- Woldemar Hägglund (1893–1963), Major General Finnish Army in the second world war
- Woldemar Kernig (1840–1917), Russian and Baltic German internist and neurologist, saved many with meningitis
- Woldemar Mobitz (1889–1951), German physician
- Oskar Woldemar Pihl (1890–1959), Russian silversmith, Fabergé workmaster
- Woldemar Voigt (1850–1919), German physicist who taught at the Georg August University of Göttingen
- Woldemar von Daehn (1838–1900), Finnish politician
- Woldemar von Seidlitz (1850–1922), Russian-born German art historian
- Ulrich Frédéric Woldemar, Comte de Lowendal (1700–1755), German-born French soldier and statesmen
- Woldemar, Prince of Lippe (1824–1895), sovereign of the Principality of Lippe from 1875

== See also ==
- Voldemar
- Waldemar
- Lord Voldemort
