= Valdimar Bergstað =

Icelandic equestrian (born 1989)

Valdimar Bergstað (born December 19, 1989) is an Icelandic equestrian. He has been riding since he was three years old, and started to compete at the age of eight in 1998.

He won 4 Icelandic champion titles in the year 2008: in T2 (which he has won since 2004), in F1 for the second time in a row, in PP1 also for the second time in a row, and in fivegait combination.

In 2005 he was the world champion in the 250m pace for young riders. He came in 4th place amongst the senior riders.

Bergstað won Landsmót in 2004 with his horse Kólfur frá Stangarholti in the junior class. There he also competed in the P2 100m pace race and ended in 3rd place, losing by only 0.08 seconds to the great riders Logi Laxdal and Sigurbjörn Bárðarson.

Bergstað was chosen as the most promising rider in Iceland in 2007 and was on the Icelandic national team for the 4th time, riding his horse Vatnar frá Vatnsholti. He competed in V1 (fourgait) and was in 15th place, just missing out on the finals.

In March 2009, Bergstað and his horse Leiknir frá Vakurstöðum took second place in the gæðinga agility event of the VÍS Masters League.
