= Valdemaras Katkus =

Lithuanian politician (born 1958)

Valdemaras Katkus (born 17 February 1958 in Kaunas) is a Lithuanian politician. In 1990 he was among those who signed the Act of the Re-Establishment of the State of Lithuania.

== See also ==
- Politics of Lithuania
