= Valdemārs =

Male given name

- Gender: Male
- Name day: 11 December

Origin
- Region of origin: Latvia

Other names
- Related names: Valdis, Voldemārs

Valdemārs is a Latvian masculine given name and surname and may refer to:

== Given name ==
- Valdemārs Baumanis (1905–1992), Latvian basketball player, basketball and football coach
- Valdemārs Klētnieks (1905–1968), Latvian writer and national Scout Commissioner for Latvia before World War II
- Valdemārs Ozoliņš (1896–1973), Latvian composer and conductor

== Surname ==
- Krišjānis Valdemārs (1825–1891), Latvian writer, editor, educator, politician, lexicographer, folklorist, and economist
  - Krišjānis Valdemārs, a Latvian icebreaker of the Ministry of Trade and Industry of the Republic of Latvia from 1926 to 1941
