= Vsevolod Tarasevich =

Soviet photographer (1919–1998)

- Born: 24 November 1919
- Died: 1998
- Occupation: Photographer

Vsevolod Sergeevich Tarasevich (Russian: Всеволод Сергеевич Тарасевич; 24 November 1919 – 1998) was a Soviet photographer. His photographs were exhibited at the Multimedia Art Museum, Moscow in 2013.
