= Volodymyr Polovets =

Ukrainian historian

Volodymyr Mykhailovych Polovets (Ukrainian: Володимир Михайлович Половець; born 2 January 1937) is a Ukrainian historian. He is a Doctor of Historical Sciences and a professor of the Chernihiv Collegium.

== Biography ==
Polovets was born in an old Ruthenian (Ukrainian) village of Vepryk (Bobrovytsia Raion, Chernihiv Oblast) on 2 January 1937. In 1958 he graduated the History and Philosophy faculty of the Nizhyn Gogol State University. In 1972 Polovets successfully defended his graduate thesis titled as "Development of economical cooperation of Union republics during years of the first five-year plan". He worked as the Soviet communist official in the Ukrainian SSR.

== Bibliography ==
=== Dissertations ===
- Development of economical cooperation of Union republics during years of the first five-year plan (Розвиток економічного співробітництва союзних республік в роки першої п'ятирічки, 1972)
- Cooperation movement in the Left-Bank Ukraine (1861—1917) (Кооперативний рух в Лівобережній Україні (1861—1917), 1997)

=== Monographs ===
- History of Ukraine, beginning course (Історія України, навчальна програма; 1999)
- Ukrainian Studies, beginning course (Українознавство, навчальна програма; 1999)
- History of Slavic people, lecturing course (Історія слов'ян, курс лекцій; 2000)
- Ukrainian Studies, lecturing course (Українознавство, курс лекцій; 2006)
- Fedir Mykhailovych Umanets (1841—1917) (Уманець Федір Михайлович (1841—1917 рр.); 2006)
- Polovets, V.M. Cumans (Половці). "Prosvita". Chernihiv, 2007. 136 pages. ISBN 9667743519
- History of Sociology (Історія соціології; 2014), along with Vitaliy Holets
