= Valdemar (disambiguation) =

Valdemar is an Old High German given name.

Valdemar may also refer to:

- Valdemar, a fictional country in the books of Mercedes Lackey
- Valdemar, the protagonist in Edgar Allan Poe's short story "The Facts in the Case of M. Valdemar"
