= Zap =

Zap or ZAP may refer to:

== Places ==
- Zap, North Dakota, U.S.
- Zhuozhou East railway station, China Railway telegraph code ZAP
- The Zap, now The Arch, a nightclub in Brighton, England
- Great Zab, a river in Turkey and Iraq
- Little Zab, a river in Iran and Iraq

== Arts and entertainment ==
=== Comics ===
- Zap Comix, an underground comics series founded by Robert Crumb in 1968

=== Fictional characters ===
- Zap (G.I. Joe), in the G.I. Joe universe
- Zap Rowsdower, in the 1990 film The Final Sacrifice
- Zap Zodiac, a 2005 Beano comic strip character
- Zap, a playable water dragon, in the Skylanders video game franchise

=== Other ===
- ZAP (satellite television), a digital satellite television operator in Portuguese-speaking sub-Saharan Africa
- Zap! Snowboarding Trix, a 1997 video game
- Z.A.P., a 2008 video game by GarageGames
- "Zap", a 1986 instrumental by Eric Johnson from Tones
- Zap.com, a 1998-2000 website run by Zapata Corporation, now known as HRG Group

== Science and technology ==
- ZAP File, a computer file extension
- ZAP (software), a web application security tool
- Zinc finger antiviral protein (ZAP) in mammals
- Zoster-associated pain, a symptom of herpes zoster (shingles)
- ZAP, an instruction mnemonic in IBM Basic assembly language
- Zap Energy, an American company that aims to commercialize fusion power
- zapping, rapidly flashing light

== Transportation ==
- ZAP (motor company), an American electric vehicle maker
- Zap flap, a type of aircraft wing flap
- Titan Airways (callsign)

== Other uses ==
- Zap (action), a form of political direct action
- AGR-14 ZAP, a US Navy air-to-surface unguided rocket
- Raye Hollitt (born 1964), American bodybuilder known as Zap on the TV show American Gladiators
- Zapotec languages (ISO 639-3 and 639-2 codes), spoken in Mexico
- Zenith Applied Philosophy, a New Zealand sect of Scientology
- Zero Aggression Principle, a personal philosophy

== See also ==
- Zapp (disambiguation)
- Zapper (disambiguation)
- Záviš of Zápy or Záviš ze Zap (c. 1350–c. 1411), Bohemian theologian and composer
- ZZZap!, a 1990s British TV programme for deaf children
