= Bleeding Edge (novel) =

2013 novel by Thomas Pynchon

- Cover to first edition hardback
- Author: Thomas Pynchon
- Cover artist: Luis Martinez/Luismmolina/Getty Images
- Language: English
- Genre: Postmodern detective
- Published: September 17, 2013 (Penguin Press)
- Publication place: United States
- Media type: Print (Hardback)
- Pages: 477
- ISBN: 978-1-59420-423-4

Bleeding Edge is a novel by the American author Thomas Pynchon, published by Penguin Press on September 17, 2013. The novel is a detective story, with its major themes being the September 11 attacks in New York City and the transformation of the world by the Internet.

== Plot summary ==
The often surreal and dream-like plot of the novel opens on the first day of spring 2001, with Maxine Tarnow walking her two sons to school before going to work.

Maxine, a former certified fraud examiner, is approached by Reg Despard regarding suspicious goings-on at hashslingrz, a computer security firm run by Gabriel Ice. She finds much of their financial numbers fail basic plausibility statistics, and notices large payments going to a now defunct website. She talks to an ex-temp for that site, learns they have strong Arab connections and move large sums of money through hawala, and notices she is being tailed afterwards. She talks to Rocky Slagiatt, VC investor behind some of Gabriel's start-ups, who is nervous about where they may be going. Meanwhile, mysterious government heavyweight Nicholas Windust puts pressure on Maxine, asking her to pump her Israeli brother-in-law for information regarding Mossad hacking methods.

Maxine's friend March Kelleher is suspicious about the activities of Gabriel Ice, her son-in-law, and asks Maxine to informally interview her daughter Tallis, Gabriel's wife. Tallis does admit to having concerns, but is unwilling to allow any auditing. Rocky introduces Maxine to Igor Dashkov, who asks her about Madoff Securities. A quick scan reveals to Maxine that the numbers are obviously too good to be true. Maxine pays a visit to Darklinear Solutions, another mystery vendor found associated with hashslingrz. She sees Tallis exiting the building, walking a bit; then someone else exiting, proceeding in the opposite direction, getting in a go-go mobile and picking up Tallis, so Maxine trails them.

The next morning, Maxine has an unexpected pre-dawn visit from Russian heavy Igor and March. Igor is very thankful, realizing he got out of Madoff Securities in time, and rewards her with illegally unhealthy ice cream. March and Maxine deliver some money to March's ex-husband, Sid, who takes them on his boat for a short drop off, but he is approached by patrol boats and races down the Hudson River, only shaking off his pursuit when he reaches New Jersey near the landfill islands.

Maxine receives a videotape which directs her to a Montauk house that suspect Vip Epperdew is known to visit. Epperdew is involved with zapper fraud. While trying to find the exact house, she's informed by a local that the house burned down a few weeks previously. The local sneaks her into the mansion Gabriel Ice is building, where he has her help him steal vintage wines. She finds a mysterious code-locked door that she breaks into, and finds it leads to a baffling underground complex. The sudden appearance of a strange, short, human-like creature sends her into a panic and she flees in a hurry.

Maxine, in following the hashslingrz money, finds some of it is being diverted into Lester Traipse's account. She confronts him, and he is terrified, and intends to return the money, and asks Maxine to arrange terms. She agrees, but next day he is found dead, an apparent suicide. With the help of Conkling Speedwell, a man with a superhuman forensic sense of smell, she learns there is a peculiar mystery scent at the scene of Lester's death. This scent is identified as "9:30 Cologne" and is soon connected with Windust. The smell also horrifies a friend of Conkling's with a supernatural sense of "foresmell" who has been smelling not-yet-existent great fires in New York for some time now.

Maxine receives a videotape of men apparently rehearsing on the Deseret rooftop the shooting down of a jet plane using a Stinger missile. She attends a humongous dotcom-style-excess party, sponsored by Gabriel Ice on Saturday night, September 8. Everyone is partying like it's 1999. She finds Felix, a teenage programmer also involved with zapper fraud, but he won't say anything about Lester. The following Tuesday, the 9/11 attacks occur. The day before, Maxine's ex-husband Horst had told her that he was going to be working all night, and she now fears the worst. But he and his business partner had watched Monday Night Football and fallen asleep, and the morning of 9/11 had joined the masses seeking refuge in New Jersey and was unable to get through. March, a blogger, leans towards low-level conspiracy theories (but nothing close to truther ideas).

Maxine takes Horst back. Eric and Driscoll, two temporarily homeless programmers, move in with them. March finds herself hunted and homeless, but she keeps up her blog using Wi-Fi. Gabriel breaks up with Tallis. Justin and Lucas, designers of the open-source program DeepArcher, find their work has become a home for numerous 9/11 ghosts. Maxine finds Windust's murdered body, and refuses to get involved. The Russians try a vircator attack on a Gabriel server farm.

The book ends with few resolutions. Maxine's children, Otis and Ziggy, display a new level of maturity and independence, as they walk to school alone.

== Major and recurring characters ==
Maxine Tarnow
Head of Tail 'Em and Nail 'Em, a detective agency specializing in fraud investigations. Separated, "quasi-ex-wife" of Horst Loeffler, whose financial escapades led to her losing her CFE license. Their children, of whom she has custody, are Ziggy and Otis. She and her sons live on the Upper West Side, and the boys attend the Otto Kugelblitz School.
Vyrva McElmo
Wife of Justin, a minor dotcom success. She has a degree from Pomona College. Her daughter Fiona attends Kugelblitz.
Lucas
Business partner of Justin. His own dotcom money mostly ended up in the red, leading him to a life of hiding. Together with Justin, they are developing DeepArcher (pun on "departure"), a highly sophisticated virtual animated tour of the Deep Web.
Daytona Lorrain
Receptionist for Maxine.
Shawn
Maxine's therapist from California. Using a blend of surfing wisdom and Zen, he teaches Maxine The Wisdom "Is what it is is...is it is what it is."
Ernie and Elaine
Maxine's parents.
Brooke and Avram ‘Avi’ Deschler
Maxine's sister and brother-in-law, arriving from Israel.
Emma Levin
Ziggy's krav maga teacher.
Reg Despard
A documentary film maker, hired by hashslingrz, a computer security firm. They are throwing unexpected obstacles in his way, so he approaches Maxine for help.
Eric Outfield
Computer hacker hired for Reg, with an extreme foot fetish.
Heidi Czornak
Maxine's best friend since high school, currently a professor of pop culture.
Evan Strubel
Heidi's ex-fiancé.
Driscoll Padgett
Web graphics designer for hwgaahwgh.com.
Horst Loeffler
Still on friendly terms with Maxine, he has recently taken a sublet on the hundredth-and-something floor of the World Trade Center.
Gabriel Ice
Dotcom billionaire and CEO of hashslingrz, some of whose financial dealings strike Maxine as irregular and even sinister. His wife is Tallis, their child is Kennedy. He wants to buy DeepArcher.
Nicholas Windust
Sinister tool of the right-wing who moves in and out of government circles, and bluntly expects American Jews to cooperate with his allegations regarding Israeli spying.
Xiomara
Young local girl Windust married in Guatemala.
Dotty
Windust's second wife.
March Kelleher
Friend of Maxine's and long-time activist. Mother of Tallis Ice. She runs a "Weblog", Tabloid of the Damned. She believes Gabriel is behind the real "Montauk project," hidden in plain sight using laughable urban legends.
Sid Kelleher
Ex-husband of March. He delivers packages for questionable people, sometimes using a Gar Wood.
Phipps "Vip" Epperdew
suspected of exploiting undocumented cash-register machine software for zapper fraud.
Felix Boïngueaux
Teenager programming both sides of zapper fraud. He is a frequent border hopper between Montreal and New York City.
Rockwell "Rocky" Slagiatt
Venture capitalist, investor in several Gabriel Ice start-ups.
Cornelia
Rocky's WASP wife.
Lester Traipse
Former hwgaahwgh.com employee, he's been siphoning money from Gabriel Ice's suspect transfers until he realizes he's in over his head.
Igor Dashkov
Some kind of Russian heavy, he deals in, among other things, highly unhealthy Soviet-style ice cream, illegally rich in butter and saturated fats. Misha and Grisha are his two torpedoes.
Chandler Platt
A financial-community big shot and fixer of some repute.
Conkling Speedwell
A "freelance professional Nose" with an acute, canine-level sense of smell. He is the inventor of the Naser.
Chazz Larday
Tallis’ fibre salesman ‘boyfriend,’ hired by Ice to keep an eye on her.

== Non-people ==
The Deseret
An Upper West Side luxury complex with a rooftop pool.
AMBOPEDIA
AMerican BOrderline PErsonality DIsorder Association. Maxine met Reg on an AMBOPEDIA cruise.
hashslingrz.com
Gabriel Ice's computer security firm. The name suggests hash slinger, but "hash" is an important concept in computer security.
hwgaahwgh.com
Hey, We've Got Awesome And Hip Web Graphix, Here. A defunct web graphics firm, apparently used by Gabriel for money laundering.
DeepArcher
Justin and Lucas' Deep Web guide, a pun on "departure."
DESPAIR
Disgruntled Employee Simulation Program for Audit Information and Review.
Promis
A software system, Inslaw's Prosecutor's Management Information System, allegedly compromised.
Eternal September
A bar popular among computer nerds, named after the Internet joke.

== Critical reception ==
Critic Michael Dirda, reviewing Bleeding Edge for The Washington Post, wrote, "Full of verbal sass and pizzazz as well as conspiracies within conspiracies, Bleeding Edge is totally gonzo, totally wonderful." David Morris Kipen wrote for Publishers Weekly, "It's a peculiarity of musical notation that major works are, more often than not, set in a minor key, and vice versa. Bleeding Edge is mellow, plummy, minor-key Pynchon, his second such in a row since Against the Day (2006)... but in its world-historical savvy, its supple feel for the joys and stings of love — both married and parental — this new book is anything but minor. On the contrary, Bleeding Edge is a chamber symphony in P major, so generous of invention it sometimes sprawls, yet so sharp it ultimately pierces."

Michael Jarvis in his review for the Los Angeles Review of Books compared it to modern day cyberpunk literature and wrote, "... all its exuberant visions of transcending the body through cyberspace — lay a deep anxiety about what it would mean to “value the virtual world more” than the material one, perhaps even to lose the ability to discern or enforce the boundaries between the two. Bleeding Edge manifests, with exquisite poignancy, the full human dimensions of those concerns." Stuart Kelly for The Scotsman called it "unequivocally a masterpiece."

Critic Michiko Kakutani, reviewing Bleeding Edge for The New York Times, called it "Pynchon Lite," and "a scattershot work that is, by turns, entertaining and wearisome, energetic and hokey, delightfully evocative and cheaply sensational; dead-on in its conjuring of zeitgeist-y atmospherics, but often slow-footed and ham-handed in its orchestration of social details."

Within the field of literary trauma studies, the novel has been analyzed as a redefinition of US national identity.

It was a finalist for the National Book Award for Fiction.
