= Zapper =

Zapper may refer to:

- Zapper (company), a Cape Town-based fintech and payment gateway provider
- Automated sales suppression device or zapper, software for falsifying cash register records
- NES Zapper, a pistol-shaped electronic light gun sold as part of the original Nintendo Entertainment System
- Wii Zapper, a gun-shaped electronic light gun sold as an accessory for the Wii
- Parasite Zapper, an electronic device to eliminate pathogens and to cure most of diseases invented and claimed by Hulda Regehr Clark
- Zapper: One Wicked Cricket, a multi-platform video game released in 2002
- Bug zapper, a device that uses a light source to attract insects to an electrical grid, where they are incinerated by the current
- Zapper, a TV ident for BBC Two from 1997 to 2001
- Zapper, a translated version of a nickname for Mikoto Misaka
