= Antiviral protein =

Proteins that interfere with viral replication

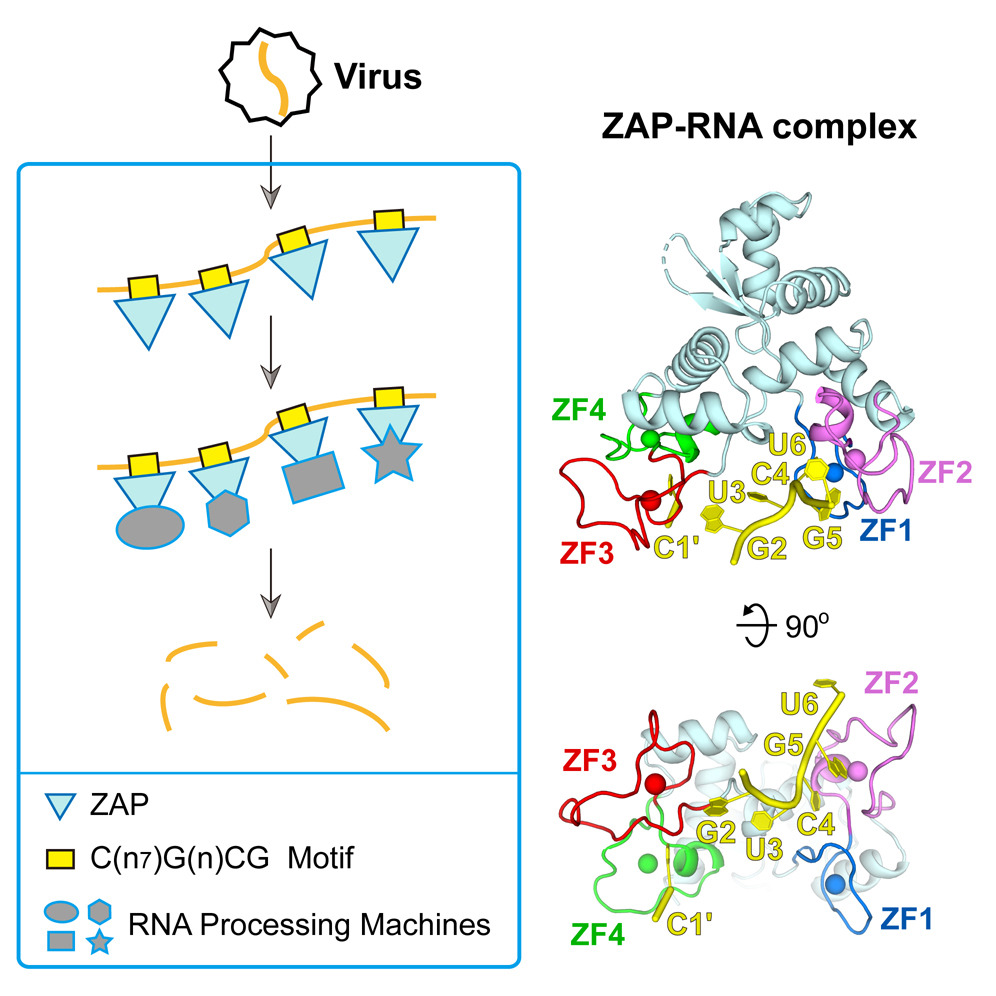
Mechanism of zinc-finger antiviral protein (ZAP) recognition of specific target RNA, and the process by which ZAP coordinates downstream RNA degradation (left). ZAP-RNA complex protein ribbon diagram (right).

Antiviral proteins are proteins that are induced by human or animal cells to interfere with viral replication. These proteins are isolated to inhibit the virus from replicating in a host's cells and stop it from spreading to other cells. The Pokeweed antiviral protein and the Zinc-Finger antiviral protein are two major antiviral proteins that have undergone several tests for viruses, including HIV and influenza.

== Pokeweed antiviral protein ==
Pokeweed antiviral protein is a ribosome inactivating protein that provides pokeweed plants protection against both viral and fungal infections. It also protects other types of plants that have genetically engineered to express RAP that do not normally do so. Recombinant pokeweed antiviral protein has also been proposed as a treatment of human diseases such as AIDS and cancer.

== ZC3HAV1 ==
ZAP (Zinc finger Antiviral Protein) is encoded by the ZC3HAV1 gene in humans whose expression is induced by interferon and helps fight a number of viral infections including influenza.

== RNase L ==
Ribonuclease L or RNase L (for latent), ais an interferon (IFN)-induced ribonuclease which, upon activation, destroys all RNA within the cell (both cellular and viral) as well as inhibiting mRNA export. RNase L is an enzyme that in humans is encoded by the RNASEL gene in humans.

== IFITM3 ==
Interferon-induced transmembrane protein 3 (IFITM3) inhibits the replication of number of enveloped RNA viruses including influenza A, HIV and the Ebola and Dengue viruses. Consequently pharmacological induction of IFITM3 potentially could be used to treat a number of viral infections.

== Protein kinase R ==
Protein kinase R is interferon stimulated and activated either by double-stranded RNA (occurring as an intermediate in RNA viruses replication) or by other proteins. It is able to phosphorylate the eukaryotic translation initiation factor eIF2α thus inhibiting further cellular mRNA translation.
