= Zapp (disambiguation) =

Zapp is an American musical group.

Zapp may also refer to:

== Business ==
- Zapp (TV channel), a Dutch children's TV channel
- Zapp Mobile, a Romanian mobile telephony operator
- Zapp (mobile payments), a UK mobile phone payment system

== Music ==
- Zapp (album), by Zapp, 1980
- Zapp or żaqq, a Maltese musical instrument

== People ==
- Jim Zapp (1924–2016), American baseball player
- Robert-Richard Zapp (1904–1964), German U-boat commander during World War II
- Walter Zapp (1905–2003), Baltic German inventor, designer of miniature cameras
- Zapp Brannigan, fictional character from the television series Futurama

== Places ==
- Willow Springs, Fayette County, Texas, US, a town previously known as Zapp

== See also ==
- Zap (disambiguation)
