= Minox =

German camera manufacturer

Minox GmbH

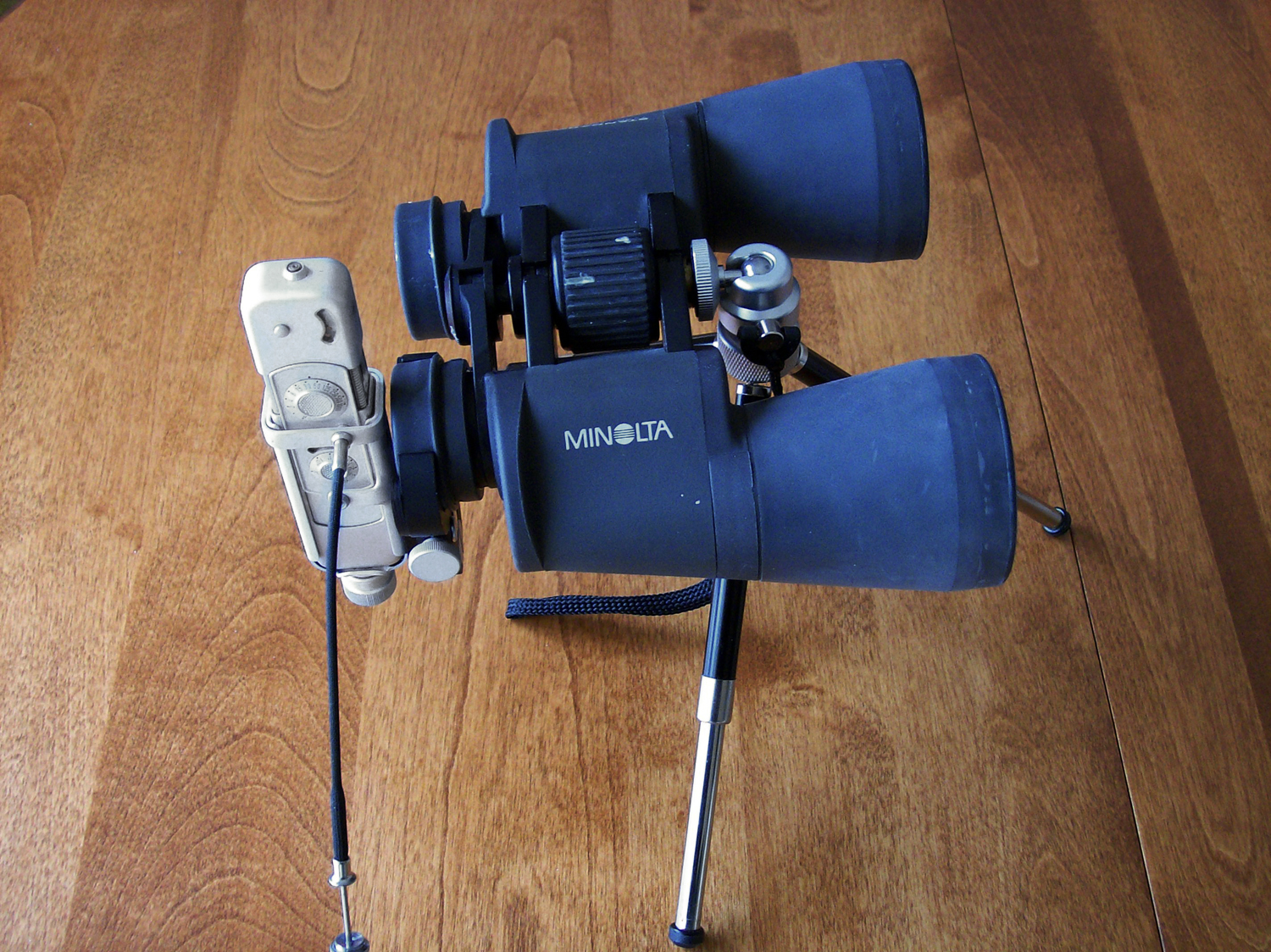
- Tele Minox with adapter on prismatic binoculars
- Industry: cameras, binoculars and other optical equipment
- Founded: 1945
- Founder: Walter Zapp
- Headquarters: Wetzlar, Germany
- Key people: Wolfgang Venzl
- Number of employees: approx. 30
- Website: www.minox.com

Upper: The Minox logo used by VEF (1938).
Lower: The Minox logo used by Minox GmbH (1949).

Minox (pronounced /ˈmiːnɒks/ MEE-noks) is a manufacturer of cameras, known especially for its subminiature camera.

The first product to carry the Minox name was a subminiature camera, conceived in 1922, and finally produced in 1936, by Baltic German Walter Zapp. The Latvian factory VEF (Valsts elektrotehniskā fabrika) manufactured the camera from 1937 to 1943. After World War II, the camera was redesigned and production resumed in West Germany in 1948.

Zapp originally envisioned the Minox to be a camera for everyone requiring only little photographic knowledge. Yet in part due to its high manufacturing costs, the Minox became more well known as a must-have luxury item. From the outset, the Minox also gained notoriety as a spy camera.

Minox branched out into 35 mm film format and 110 film format cameras in 1974 and 1976, respectively. Outside cameras, the company also had a strong position in the microfiche equipment market.

Minox continues to operate today, producing or branding optical and photographic equipment.

== History ==
From 1936 to 1976, the history of the Minox brand is essentially that of the Minox subminiature camera. From 1976 the Minox name also became associated with other products, most notably the Minox 35 mm compact cameras produced from 1975 until 2004. A roll-film 120 compact camera was contemplated, but never produced.

Minox was acquired by Leica in 1996, but a management buyout on 25 August 2001, then final completion of disposal in 2005, left Minox an independent company.

== Minox subminiature camera ==
=== Subminiature camera history ===
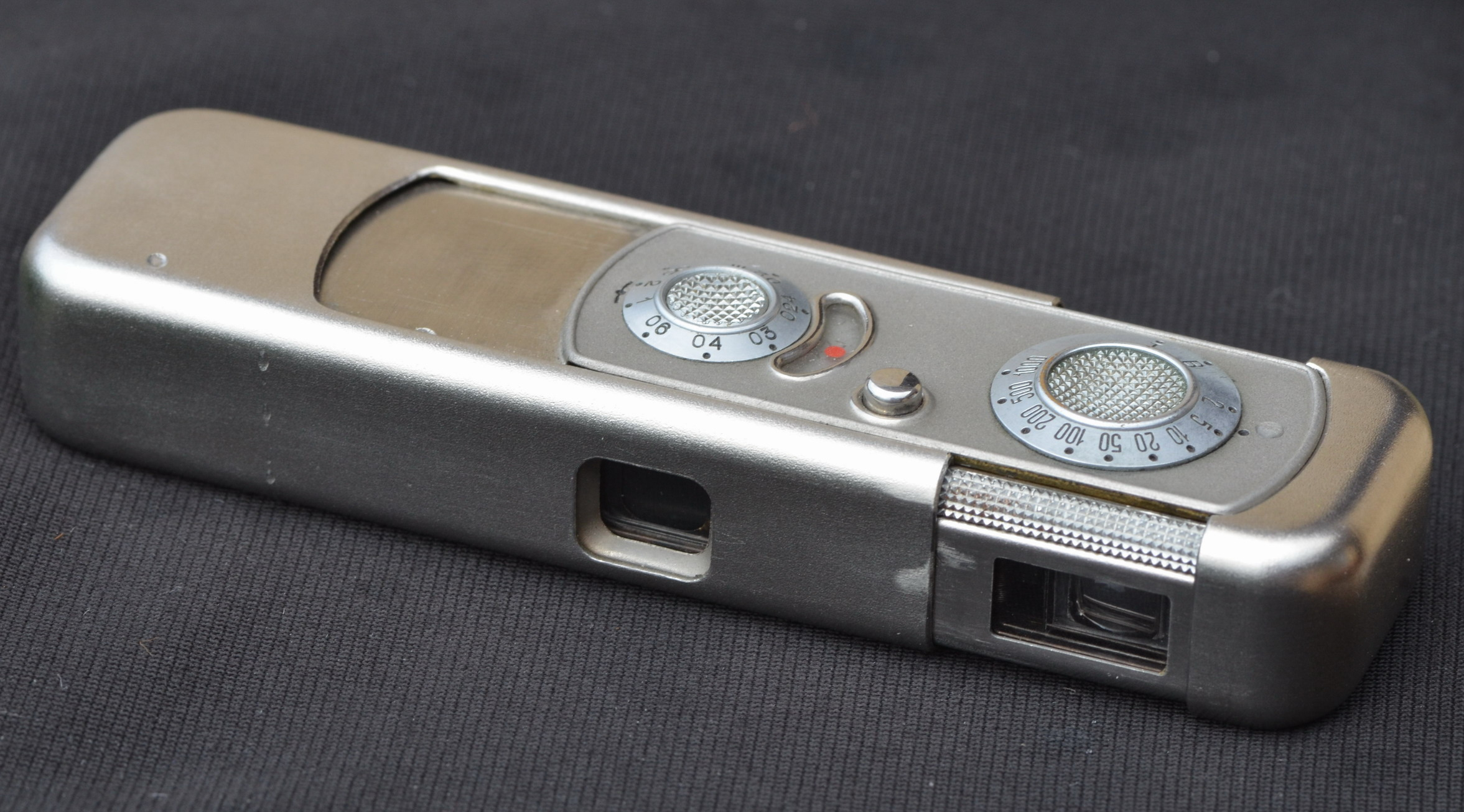
Minox Riga with Minostigmat 1:3,5 F=15mm lens

The original Minox subminiature camera was invented by Walter Zapp in 1936. Zapp, a Baltic German, was born in 1905 in Riga, then part of the Russian Empire. The family moved to Reval (now called Tallinn, Estonia) where he first took a job as an engraver before finding a position with a photographer. He became friends with Nikolai 'Nixi' Nylander and Richard Jürgens, and it was through discussions with these friends that the idea of a camera that could always be carried came to him. Nixi Nylander also coined the name "Minox" and drew up the Minox mouse logo. Jürgens funded the original project but was not able to get support in Estonia for production. Jürgens contacted an English representative of the VEF (Valsts Elektrotehniskā Fabrika) electrotechnical manufacturing business in Riga (by then independent Latvia) who then arranged a meeting where Zapp demonstrated the Minox prototype (UrMinox), with a set of enlargements made from Ur-Minox negatives. Production began in Riga at VEF, running from 1937 until 1943. In the same time, VEF had received patent protection on Zapp's inventions in at least 18 countries worldwide.

Shortly after its introduction, the Minox was widely advertised in The European and American markets. It did not surmount the popularity of 35 mm cameras (which were then referred to as "Miniature Cameras"), but did achieve a niche market. It also attracted the attention of intelligence agencies in America, South Africa, Europe, and the Soviet bloc due to its small size and macro focusing ability.

Ironically during World War II production of the Minox was put in jeopardy several times as Latvia fell victim to invasion by the Soviet Union, then Germany, and then by the Soviets again. Cameras were produced under both Russian and German occupation nevertheless, and the camera became both a luxury gift item for Nazi leaders as well as a tool for their spies. In the meantime, Zapp and his associates protected their interest in the product by searching for alternative production facilities in Germany.

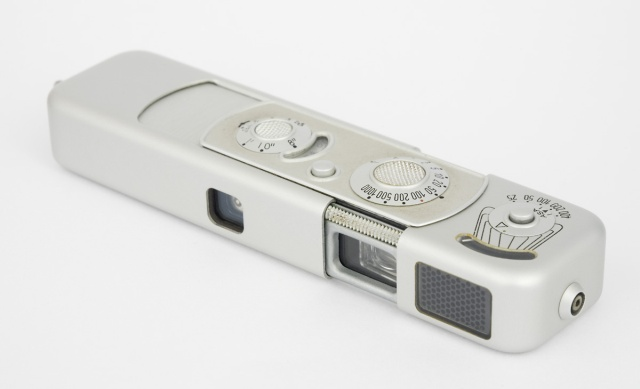
Late Production Minox B camera with later style "honeycomb" selenium light meter

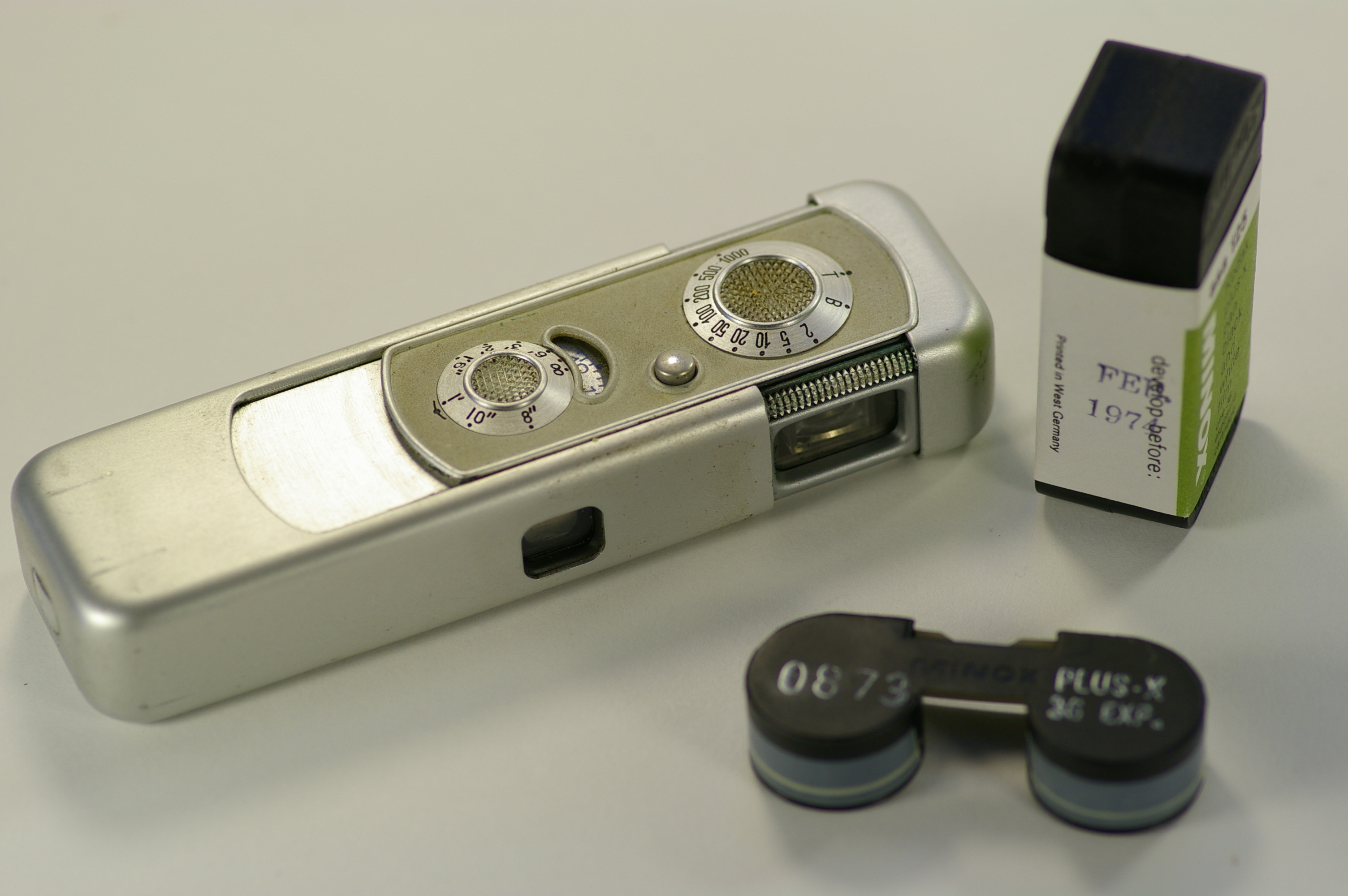
Minox IIIs camera with a cartridge of film

After World War II, production of the Minox II began in 1948 at a new company, Minox GmbH, in Giessen/Heuchelheim near Wetzlar, West Germany. The new camera very much resembled the original, but was made with an aluminum shell. This greatly reduced its weight and, to an extent, cost. The camera continued to appeal to a luxury "gadget" market which broadened during the 1950s and early 1960s. It also continued to see use as an espionage camera by both sides during the Cold War. During this time, the Minox company continued to develop the camera, working with Gossen to develop a companion miniature exposure meter, as well as improved models such as the Minox B, which incorporated an even smaller Gossen-designed meter into the camera itself. The Minox B became the most popular and widely produced model of the line. Further developments included autoexposure, and the company developed an extensive line of accessories. These included flash guns, viewfinder attachments, tripod mounts, and copying stands, all increasing the camera utility in a variety of applications. One accessory even allowed the camera to use a pair of binoculars as a telephoto lens (see illustration). Limited editions of the camera were also produced in a variety of luxury finishes, such as gold plating. Standard cameras were also available in an optional black anodized finish.

The Riga Minox camera, along with the luxury-finish postwar cameras, are now collector's items. All-mechanical models A and B remain in use by hobbyists. In 1969 the model C became the first camera of its kind to incorporate electronic exposure control. With the introduction of the LX in 1978 came significant redesign of the camera's basic controls. It was followed by the final production model, the TLX. There was also a fully electronic entry-level model, the EC (1981) then EC-X (1996) which had a very different internal design and a fixed-focus lens. The production rate for these cameras was considerably slower than in former years, however, as higher production costs reduced sales and revenues.

Beginning in 1981, MINOX experienced increasing difficulties. A quarter of the original 750 employees had to be made redundant. A settlement request was filed with the District Court in Giessen on November 21, 1988. Under the direction of the receivership administration, the workforce was reduced to just under 300, and the business was extensively reorganized. There was also a court case taken out by the new owners over alleged hidden pension costs. These were not fully disclosed until post-acquisition accounting.

The final MINOX TLX Camera (Titonal Eloxat anti-scratch coating) was available until September 2014.Minox UK sold off its UK stock of TLX's in 2006. Minox is now part of the Blazer Group GmBH, with its facilities in Isny im Allgäu in the south of Germany, with a service facility remaining in Wetzlar. Production of 8x11 film ended by Minox ended in 2014 and by Sharan in 2017. Film production continues today by Blue Moon Cameras in the US and MS Hobbies in the UK. MS Hobbies produced new aluminum 8x11mm cassettes in 2021 and offer a cassette refill service.

The company now produces high-quality sports optics and night-vision devices, its only camera models being trail cameras.

==== Spy camera ====
The Minox subminiature camera attracted the attention of intelligence agencies in America, Britain and Germany, and most of the Eastern Bloc (East Germany, Romania) due to its small size and macro focusing ability. There is at least one document in the public record of 25 Minox cameras purchased by the US Office of Strategic Services intelligence organisation in 1942. The use of Minox 8x11 cameras by secret services has been documented in several famous espionage cases.

The close-focusing lens and small size of the camera made it perfect for covert uses such as surveillance or document copying. The Minox was used by both Axis and Allied intelligence agents during World War II. Later versions were used well into the 1990s. The Soviet spy John A. Walker Jr., whose actions against the US Navy cryptography programs represent some of the most compromising intelligence actions against the United States during the Cold War era, used a Minox C to photograph documents and ciphers.

An 18-inch (460 mm) measuring chain was provided with most Minox subminiature cameras, which enabled easy copying of letter-sized documents. The espionage use of the Minox has been portrayed in Hollywood movies and TV shows, and some 1980s Minox advertising has played up the "spy camera" story.

==== Other special uses ====
A Minox B, operated by remote trigger and protected in a special housing, was used to inspect the interior of the United States Army's SL-1 experimental nuclear reactor after it experienced an internal steam explosion in 1961. This camera and housing were shown in the film report released following the accident investigation.

=== Technical details of Minox 8×11 cameras ===
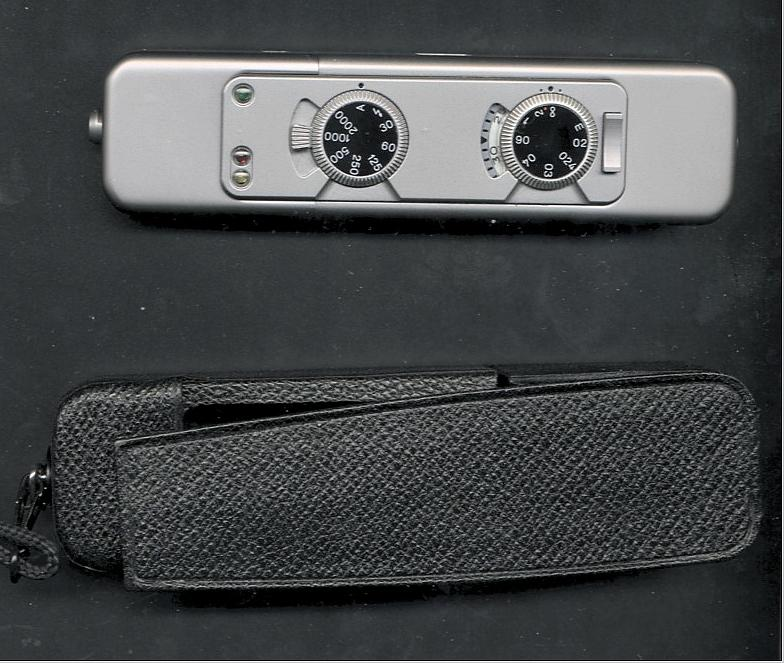
Minox TLX

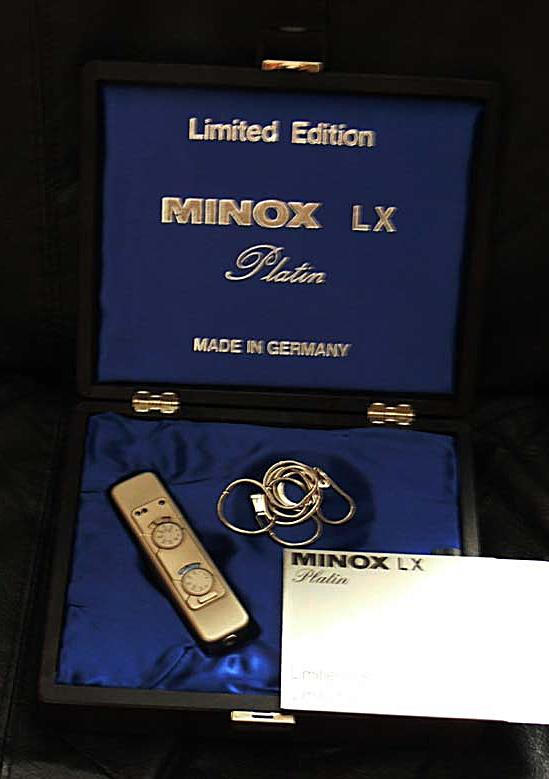
Minox Platin

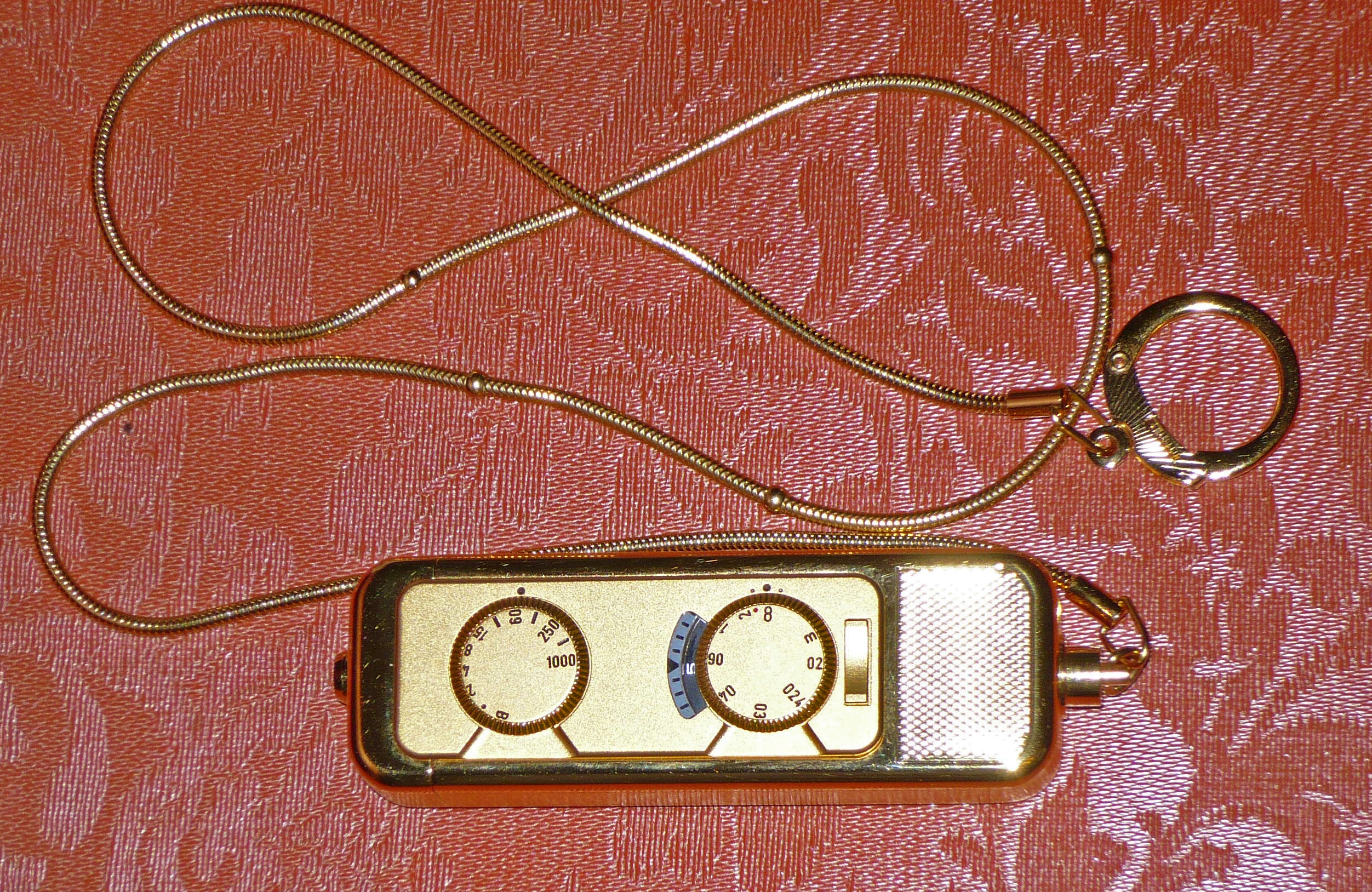
Minox Gold AX

The original Riga-made Minox had a brass chassis covered in a stainless steel shell, which telescopes to reveal or cover the lens and viewfinder windows, as well as to advance the film. It was equipped with a parallax correcting viewfinder, which was coupled to a Cooke triplet type Minostigmat 15 mm f/3.5 lens. This lens is of outstanding quality and stands up well in comparison with the Complan lens used in later models.

The lens was capable of focusing as close as 20 cm, and, due to its small image size, provided such depth of field at full aperture that a diaphragm was deemed unnecessary. The maximum focus zone was about one meter to infinity. In front of the lens was a metal foil curtain shutter, which was itself protected by a window. These were advanced features at the time for any camera, regardless of size.

The dimensions of the Minox subminiature camera are: 80 mm × 27 mm x 16 mm; weight: 130 g.

The Minox cameras project an image of 8×11 mm onto the negative. The film is in strips 9.2 mm wide, or less than one-quarter the size of 35 mm film, and unlike 35 mm film, it has no sprocket holes. This film strip is rolled up in the supply side chamber of a small twin chamber cartridge, with the film leader taped to a take-up spool in the take up chamber. The film strips can be up to 50 frames in length for Riga Minox and Minox II, III, IIIs and B cameras. From Minox BL and C cameras onward the Minox film cartridge holds 15, 30, or 36 exposures.

The VEF Riga has a three-element flat film plane lens. Performance could be improved, so the short-lived Minox II (1948–1951) had a new 5 element lens (called complan - "compensating plane" ) whose rear element would rest against the film itself when the pressure plate pushed the film onto the lens. Contemporaneous customers complained of film scratches with this new design, so most of these lenses were replaced by MINOX with the later curved-field compensating lens. Consequently, original 'film lens' Minox II are exceptional. Early Minox cameras from Minox A/III to Minox B were equipped with a four-element, three-group Complan (lens) designed by ex-Leica lens designer Arthur Seibert. The Complan lens has curved film plane, hence in these cameras the negative must be held in an arc to improve the edge-to-edge sharpness of the image. The Minox enlarger of the period also holds the negative in this same curve. Later models, beginning with late model Minox C, to the current model TLX, using the 15 mm f/3.5 four-element, three-group flat-field Minox lens, which holds the negative flat. The advance was attributed by Rolf Kasemeier (Small MINOX Big Pictures 1971 edition) to new rare-earth element, high-index, low-dispersion, optical glasses becoming available (probably from Schott Glass, of Jena). Note that lens performance between old and new complan/minox lenses was rated by MINOX themselves as identical.

At this time to differentiate between negatives taken with the older complan lens and negatives taken with the later minox lens, MINOX introduced an edge code in the negative. Since the MINOX C (the first camera released with the new minox lens in 1971, even though early C cameras have a complan lens) each model of 8x11mm camera to the Sharan (triangle) has a distinct edge code to identify the camera. The reason was that some commercial processors used MINOX enlargers. As the minox lens replaced the complan, so the enlargers had to change lenses: MINOX II/III enlargers were curved negative track and complan lenses, post-1971 MINOX III enlargers were straight negative track and minox lenses. Ironically, owners of Rigas and model II cameras get better results from a flat-planed enlarger than a MINOX II enlarger.

The early Minox cameras from Riga to Minox B, BL and AX, were equipped with a mechanical shutter, while later model Minox ( C, LX, EC, TLX ) cameras have an electromagnetic shutter. When closed, the viewfinder and lens windows are protected. Complan lens and Minox lens are unit focusing lens, focusing from 8 inches (20 cm) to infinity through precision gear linked to a focusing dial on top of the camera. All Minox cameras, except the EC and MX, have a parallax correction viewfinder: when the focusing dial moves, the viewfinder moves in tandem to correct for parallax.

From the Riga to Minox B, the film counter counts up to 50, while from Minox BL, C, to TLX, the film counter counts down from 36/30/15. For mechanical Minox 8x11 cameras, a separate shutter speed dial sets the shutter speed from 1/2 to 1/1000 second, plus B and T (the BL model has no documented T). For electromagnetic shutter cameras, the shutter dial starts with 1/15 sec, and ends with 1/1000 (Minox C), or starts with 1/30 and ends with 1/2000 (Minox LX/TLX/CLX); the electromagnetic Minox camera also has an 'A' setting for automatic exposure, controlled by the built-in CdS (Minox C) or Spd (Minox LX/TLX) exposure meter.

Above the viewfinder is a filter bar used to slide a yellow, green or an orange filter in front of the lens; starting with the C, there is only a Neutral Density filter.

For Riga Minox to Minox B, the film advances each time the camera is closed, regardless of whether a picture is taken or not. Opening the camera causes the pressure plate to press the film into a concave surface to stiffen thin emulsions for better clarity. When the camera is closed, the pressure plate moves back from the film plane, thus allowing the film strip to move freely to advance to the next frame. From Minox C onward, the camera is equipped with a "freewheeling" mechanism, such that the film advances one frame only when a picture is taken, otherwise, closing the camera does not advance a frame.

Minox BL uses a PX625 button cell to power the CdS exposure meter; Minox C, LX, EC, used a 5.6v PX27 mercury battery to power the exposure meter and electromagnetic shutter. TLX, CLX, ECX use four 1.5v 386 silver oxide button cell in an adapter; this adapter combo can also be used to replace the discontinued 5.6v PX27 battery for Minox C, LX and EC.

8×11mm TLX Special Order models were available new until September 2014.

=== Major production runs ===
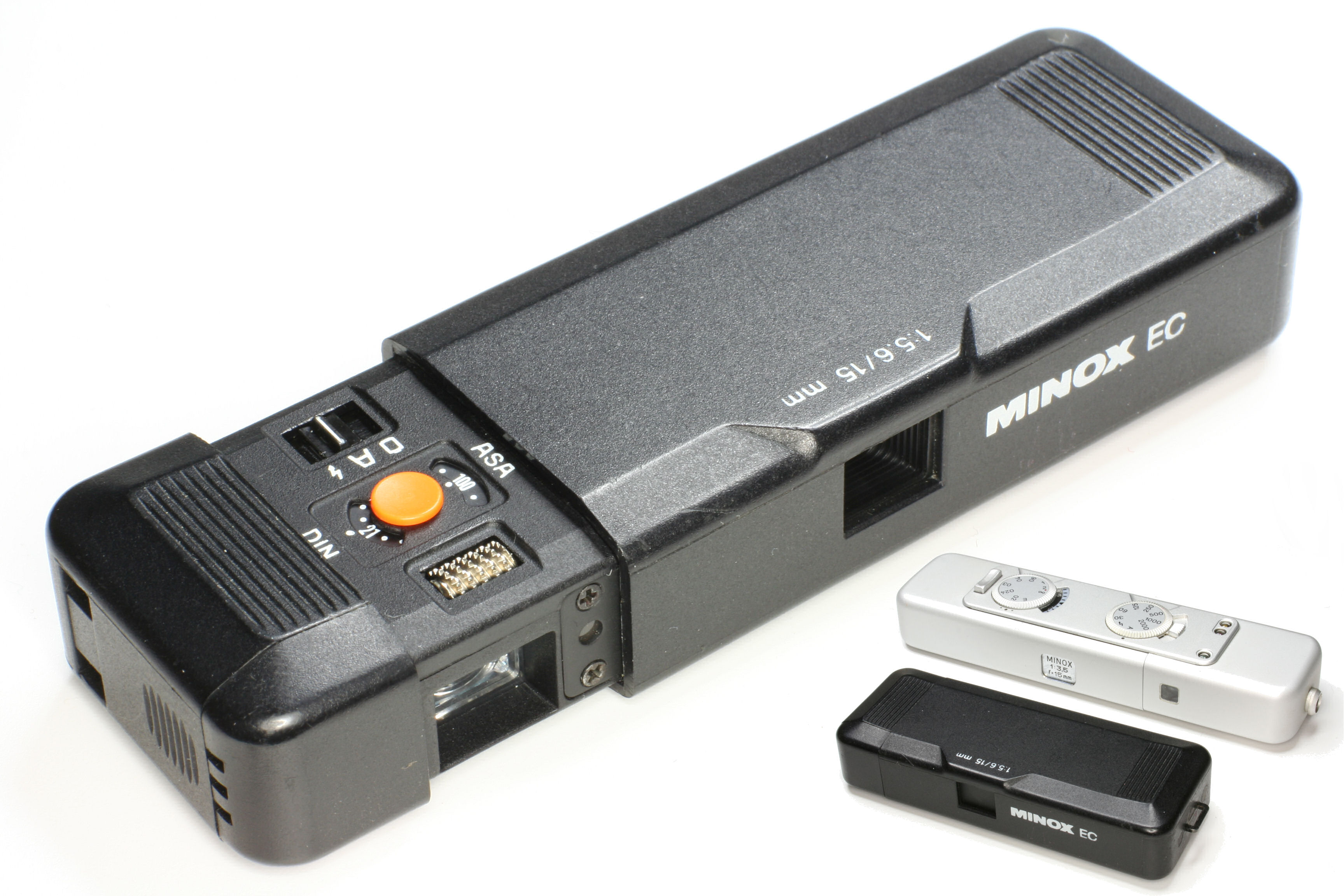
Minox EC

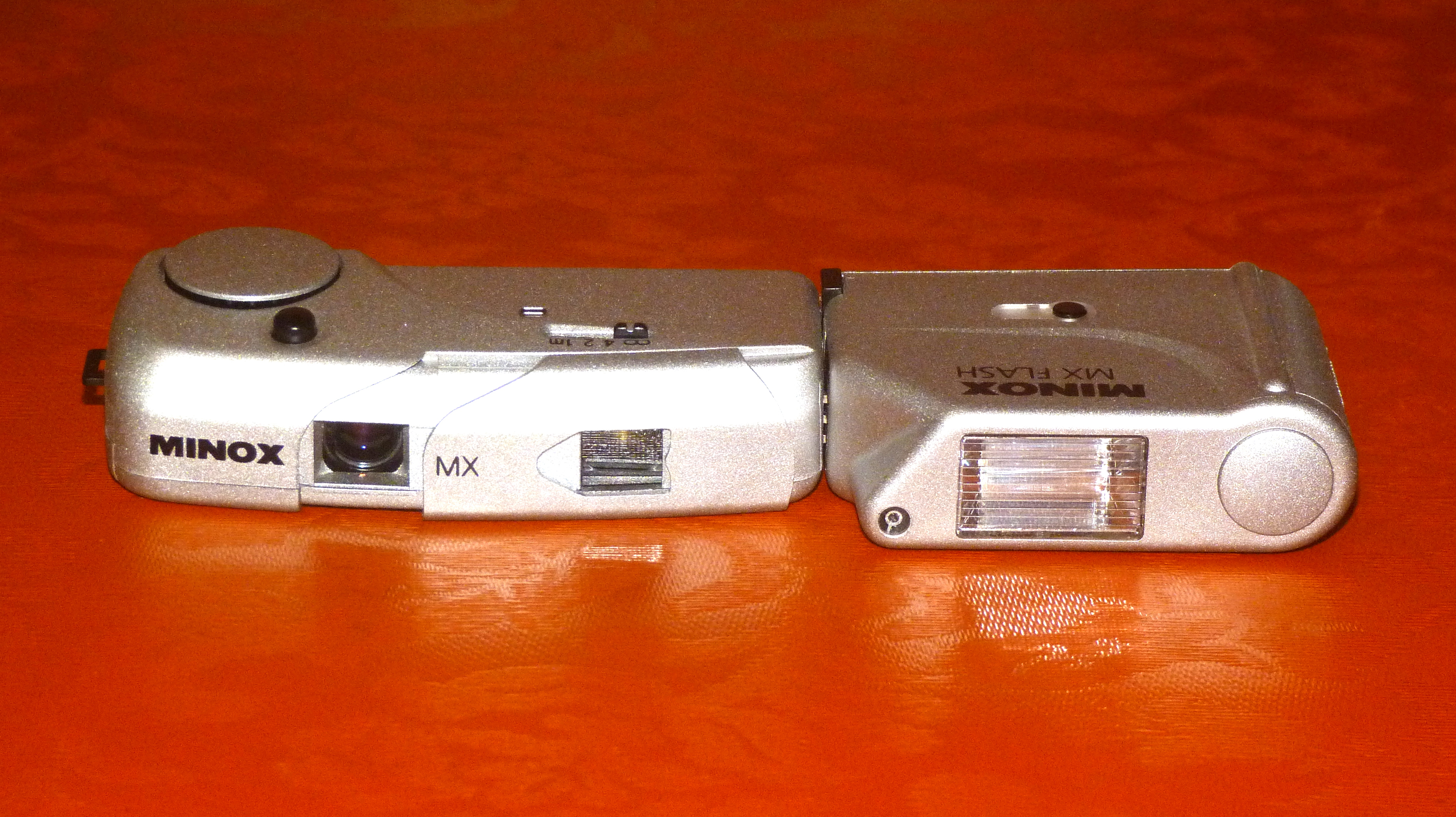
Minox MX

Minox Models

- Riga – 1938/39 to 1942/43 (retrospectively labeled Model I; usually named after the city Riga)

- I – 3 element Minostigmat lens, stainless steel

- A – 1948 to 1969 (retrospectively labeled Model II with the launch of Minox III)

- II – (1948) 5 element Complan lens, ultralight aluminium shell, new shutter
- III – (1950) 4 element Complan lens,
- IIIs – (1954) + flash synch

- B – 1958 to 1972 ultralight aluminium shell, selenium meter

- B – (1958) Complan lens
- B – (1970) Minox lens

- C – 1969 to 1978 introduced in 1969, electronic

- C – (1969) Complan lens
- C – (1970) Minox lens

- BL – 1972 to 1973 with cadmium sulphide meter (requiring a battery), no longer wound film with each open/close cycle
- LX – 1978 to now

- LX – (1978) electronic, in anodized aluminium, black aluminium, gold and platinum finish
- TLX – (1995) titanium titanal eloxat coated (available again as special order)

- EC – 1981 to 2004

- EC – (1981) more economical model, smallest Minox
- ECX – (1998) minor changes to the EC - uniquely a 'cassette reminder' light flashes when switched. When 'on' a film is present in the camera.

- MX, distinct model with Minox MX FLASH based on the Sharan camera without the meter. Thumb wheel film advance and shutter cocking, mechanical shutter speed 1/125 sec, lens 1:4.8 15mm three element in 2 group glass lens, focusing dial: 1M,2M,4M and infinity.

=== Special edition runs ===
- AX – similar in size the A (all mechanical) and built from some BL parts with an LX shell, versions in chrome, black and gold
- LX Sterling – 925 sterling silver hallmarked ¬100 produced
- LX Selection – gold with black dials 999 produced
- LX Gold II – anniversary edition, cross-hatched gold-plating, with Walter Zapp's signature. 250 produced
- LX Platin – Limited edition platinum Minox LX
- CLX – with Walter Zapp's signature with VHS tape.
- LX 2000 – brass black anodized with gold trim. Early models came with a pen.
- Aviator – black anodized with luminous dials, logo and script limited edition of 300. Early models came with a watch
- MHS EC – Minox Historical Society EC with MHS logo limited edition of 100
- MinoxClub EC – 1st German Minox club EC in Riga blue with club logo, limited edition of 111.
- LX 100th Anniversary Edition – polished chrome with Walter Zapp's commemorative coin

The total number of all Minox 8x11 cameras made was about 944,500 units.

Minox Germany today offer servicing of 8x11 cameras up to the MX, but including the VEF Minox via MS Hobbies in the UK.

=== Minox 8×11 accessories ===
- Minox tripod, ver 1 and 2
- Minox tripod adapter (3 Variations: Riga, (A/II/III/B, BL, C) and (LX/TLX/CLX)
- Minox copy stand (2 Variations (LX and non-LX Cameras)
- Minox waist level finder ((2 Variations (A, B)
- Minox 90 degree mirror (3 Variations (A, B and 'universal')
- Minox film slitter (Minox and non-Minox produced)
- Minox enlargers (Colour and Black and White), then curved or flat plane lens
- Minosix selenium exposure meter (For A Cameras)
- Minox flashgun (Bulb and Cubeflash)
- Minox electronic flash (3 types, ME1/ME2 and 8x11)
- Minox binocular adapter (2 types LX and non-LX Cameras)
- Minox microfilm reader (At least 2 types)
- Minox daylight development tank with thermometer (2 types: Riga and Minox: 50 and 36 exposure tanks are not compatible)
- Minox negative viewer and cutter combined, or just viewer
- Minox film wallets (for 50 or 36 exposure films)
- Minox battery adapter, for replacement of discontinued PX27 5.6v mercury battery used in electromagnetic Minox cameras.

==== Minox 8x11 format slide projector ====
Matching the size of the slide film for the 8×11 MINOX cameras, MINOX also produced slide projectors ending with the auto-focus HP24 model.

==== Post Minox third party accessories ====
- Minox Cutters by Jimmy Li (9.2mm)
- Minox Cutters by Camerhack (9.4mm)
- Minox Cutters by MS Hobbies (9.0mm)
- Minox new metal cassettes by MS Hobbies (9.0mm)
- Minox wallets by JimmyLi (5 x 10 rows)
- Third party cassettes 3D printed
- Third party paterson/jobo developing spirals 3D printed
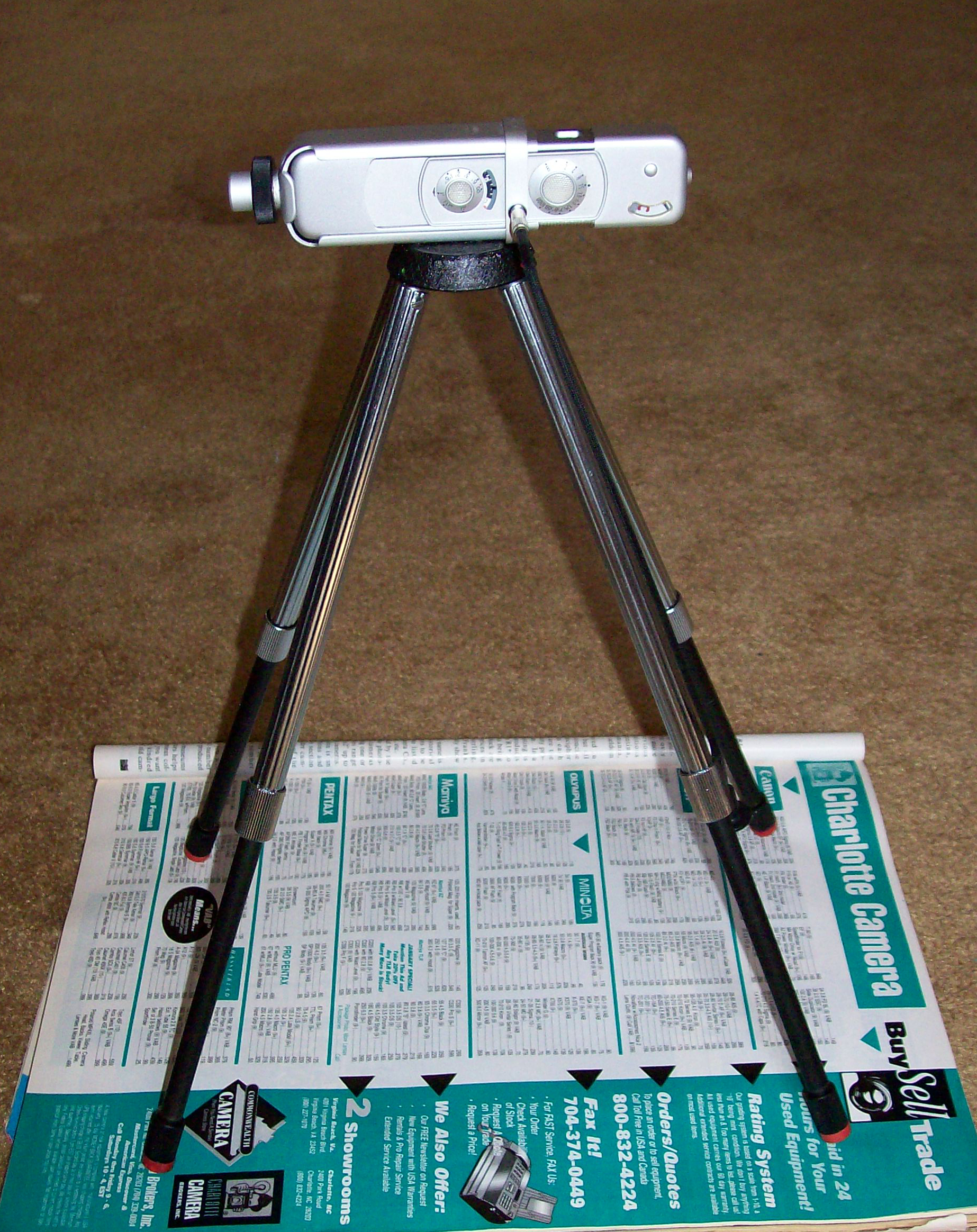
Minox copystand

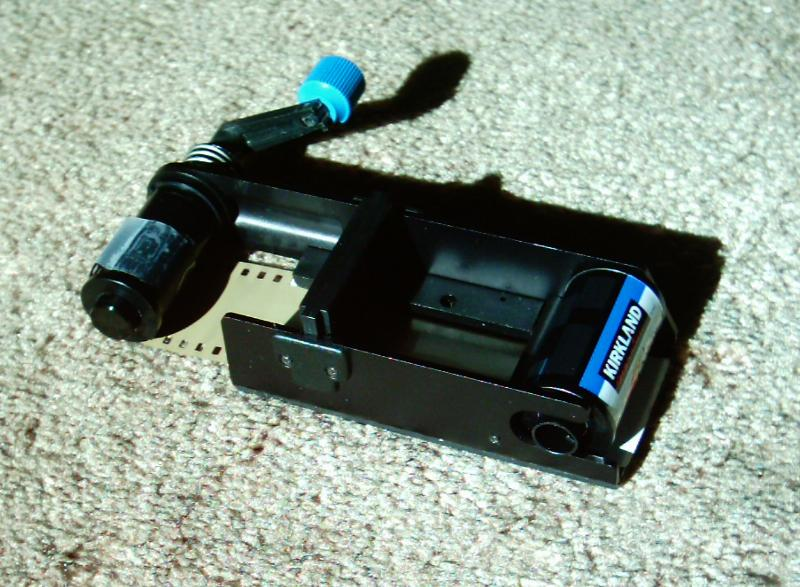
Minox film slitter

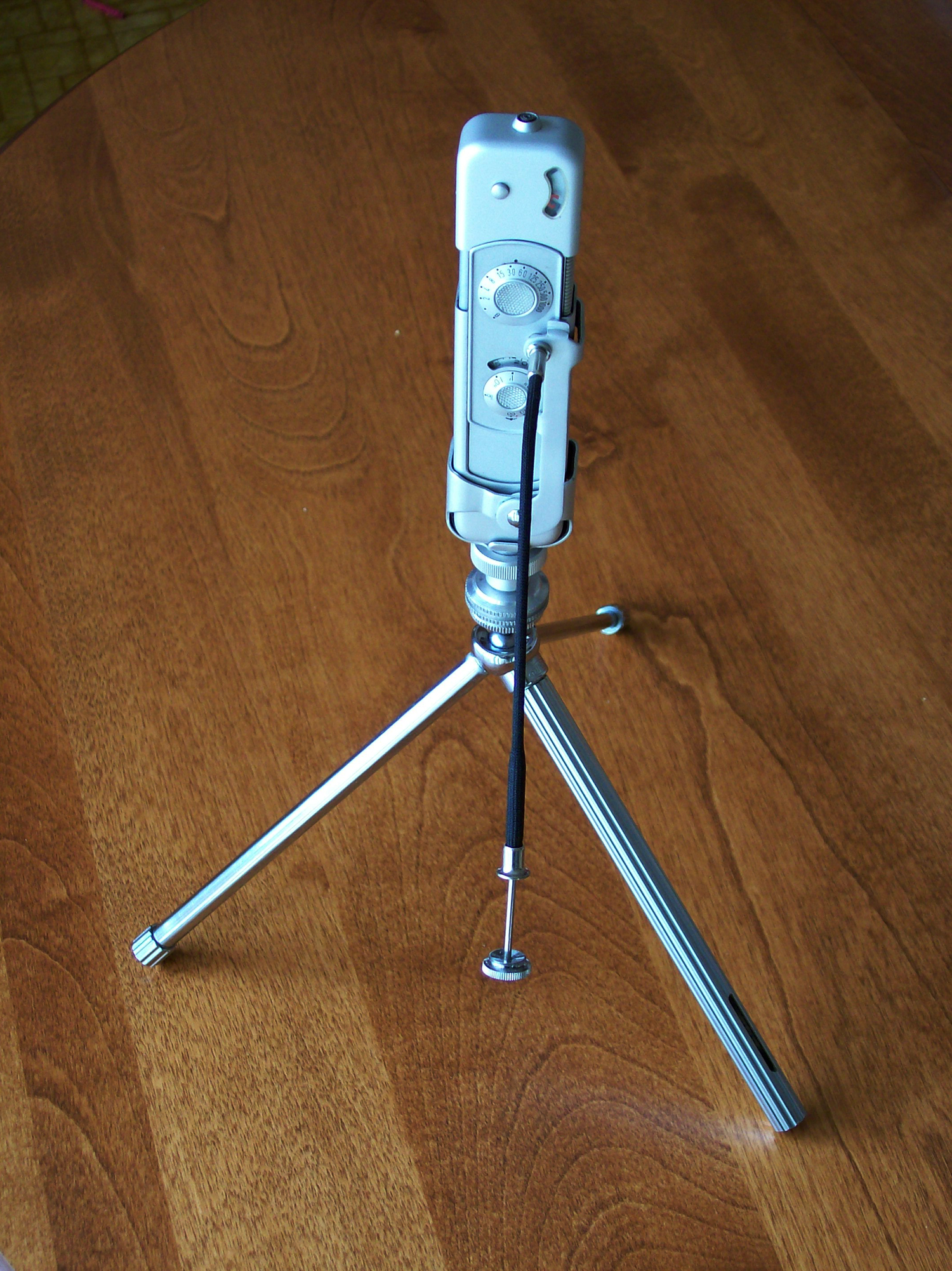
Minox tripod

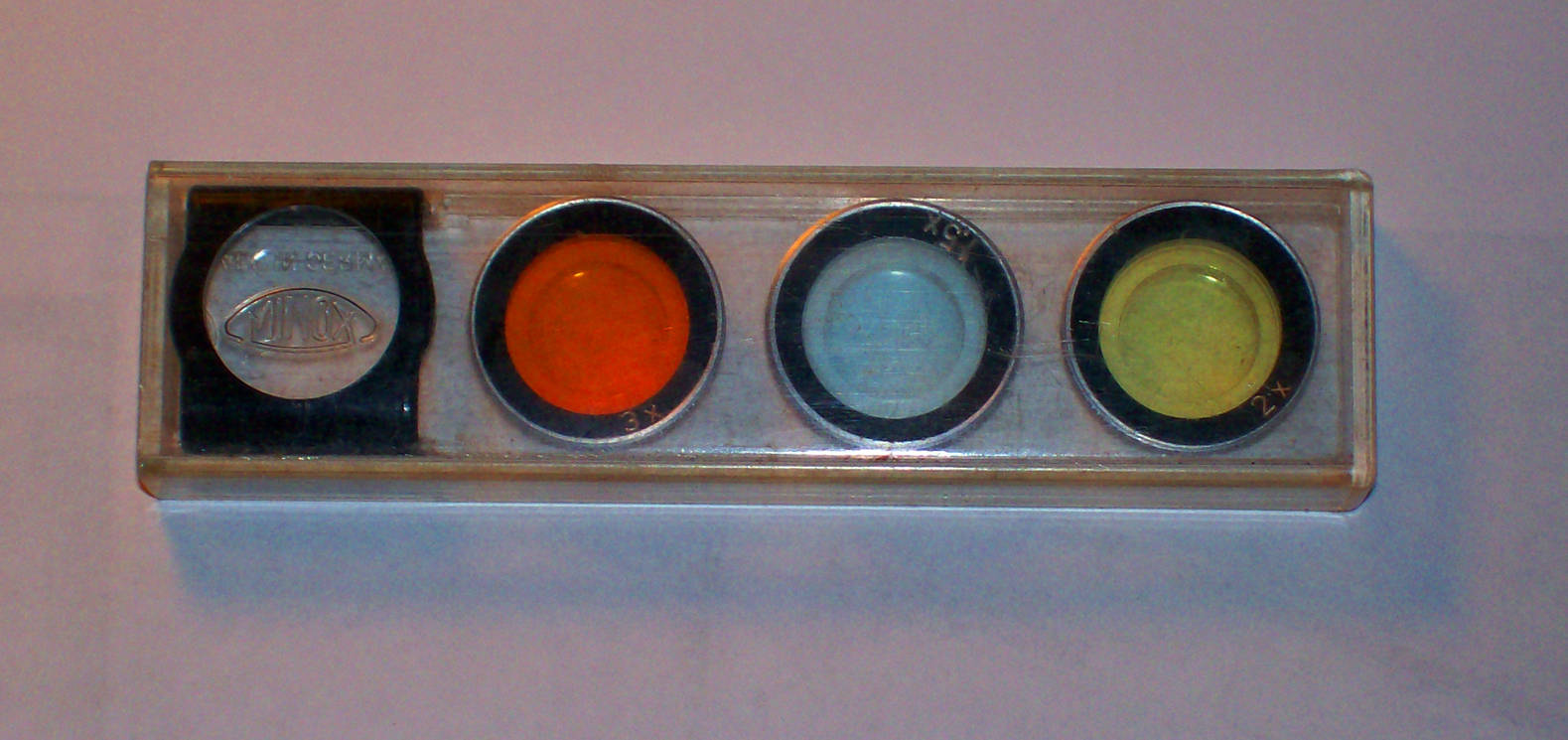
Minox color filter set

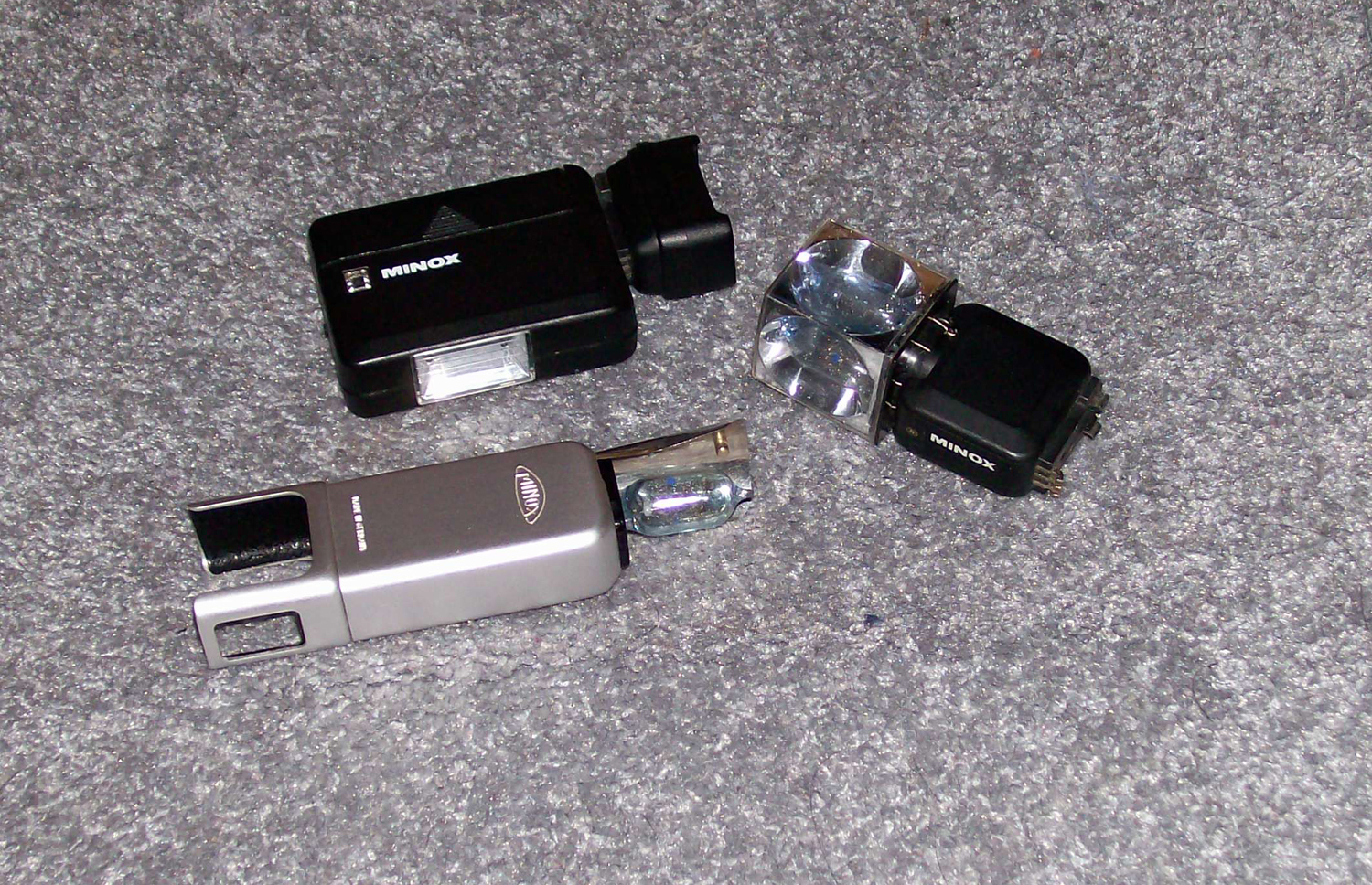
Minox electronic flash, cube flash and bulb flash

== Minox 35 mm cameras ==
=== Minox 35 mm compact cameras ===
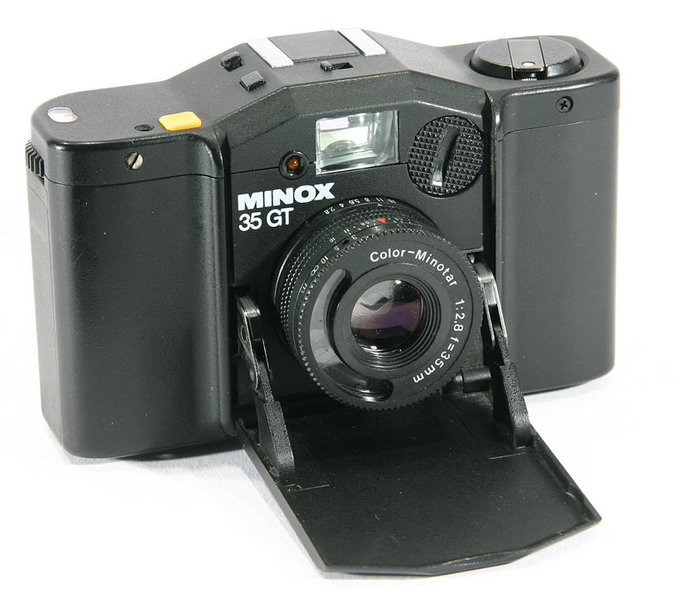
Minox 35 GT lens cover opened.

In 1974, Minox introduced a very compact (100 mm × 61 mm × 31 mm), glass fibre reinforced Makrolon bodied 35 mm film camera designed by Professor Fischer of Vienna University: the Minox EL, the first in the Minox 35 mm series. These compact cameras featured a drawbridge style lens cover which when lowered brought forward a 35 mm focal length f/2.8 four-element, three-group Tessar-type Minotar/Minoxar lens with between the lens leaf shutter and diaphragm, a center positioned viewfinder, two stroke film winder lever and a film rewind knob. The Minox 35 camera back must be removed for loading or unloading film.

The camera offered aperture priority exposure with the option of manual settings. The Minox 35ML and Minox M.D.C offer program mode (P mode) exposure in addition to aperture priority. The 35 mm/2.8 Minotar/Minoxar lens was very sharp, with low distortion, while the camera's metering-system's capability to produce excellent results especially under low-light conditions was outstanding – using exposure times of up to two minutes.

Most models have a 2x backlit exposure switch and a 10 sec timer switch. When the timer is engaged, a flashing LED indicates the timer counter is counting down, for the last two sec, the flash interval shortened.

Until 1995, the Minox 35 cameras were considered the smallest cameras for the standard 35 mm film format. The design was inspired by the Rollei 35, which had been the smallest 35 mm camera for eight years. The Rollei 35 is only slightly bigger, but much heavier than the Minox 35 cameras. However, the Minolta TC-1, introduced in 1996, is smaller.

==== Minox 35 mm compact camera versions ====
- Minox EL, 1974
- MINOX GL, 1979–1981
- MINOX GT, 1981–1991
- MINOX GT-Golf, 1984
- Minox GT-Sport

All the above models use a single 5.6 v PX27 battery which can be replaced with two CR 1/3N 3 V Lithium Batteries by using an adapter.

- MINOX PL, 1982–1983, program-controlled version of EL- or G-series
- MINOX ML, 1985–1995
- MINOX MB, 1986–1999
- MINOX AL, 1987–1988, simplified program-controlled version of EL- or G-series
- MINOX AF, 1988–1990, autofocus
- MINOX GT-E, 1988–1993 with built in UV filter.
- MINOX AF-90, 1990–, autofocus
- MINOX MB Touring, 1990 3333 produced
- MINOX Goldknopf 1991–1993, EL- or G-series version with a solid gold button for shutter release.
- MINOX GT 'anniversary' 1991 marking 10 years of production
- MINOX GSE, 1991–1994 German market only
- MINOX M.D.C, 1992–1995. This is the flagship of Minox 35 mm series. MDC differs from all other models by its anodized aluminium shell over Macrolon body; with two styles: a gold plated model and a titanium coated model. MDC has a multicoated Minoxar 35 mm/2.8 lens, all other functions are identical to Minox 35ML. Due to the extra metal shell, the dimension of Minox M.D.C is slightly larger than other Minox 35 cameras.
- MINOX MDC gold Collection, 1993–1994
- MINOX AF mini, 1994–, autofocus and a totally different camera shape to any other 35mm Minox.
- MINOX GT-X, 1998–1999
- MINOX GT-E(II), 1998–2001
- MINOX GT-S, 1998–2004

All the above, except ML, and MDC use 2 x CR 1/3N 3V Lithium batteries or a single 6V SPX27 silver oxide battery. ML, MB and MDC use a single 6V PX28 battery.

Accessories for Minox 35 include: UV filter/hood, ND filter/hood, ever-ready leather case, copy stand, and dedicated electronic flashes (normal, high speed and bounce). Minox Germany today offer servicing of 35 G/P/E and M camera via MS Hobbies in the UK.

=== Other Minox 35 mm cameras ===
The few 35 mm cameras offered were of the "point and shoot" style:

- MINOX M*142
- MINOX M*142 DB
- MINOX CD-25 silver
- MINOX CD-25 black
- MINOX CD-29 silver
- MINOX CD-29 black
- MINOX CD-70 silver
- MINOX CD-70 black
- MINOX CD-112 silver
- MINOX CD112 black
- MINOX CD-128
- MINOX CD-140
- MINOX Edition 140
- MINOX CD-150
- MINOX CD-155

== Other products ==
=== Minox 110 camera ===
MINOX 110S, a 110 film format camera was also once sold. The Minox 110S has a Carl Zeiss Tessar 25 mm/2.8 unit focusing lens, and magicube flash. It is the only camera with a rangefinder made by Minox. An external electronic flashgun was also available. Users report that the 110S provides particularly good results on modern 110 film.

=== Miniature retro cameras ===
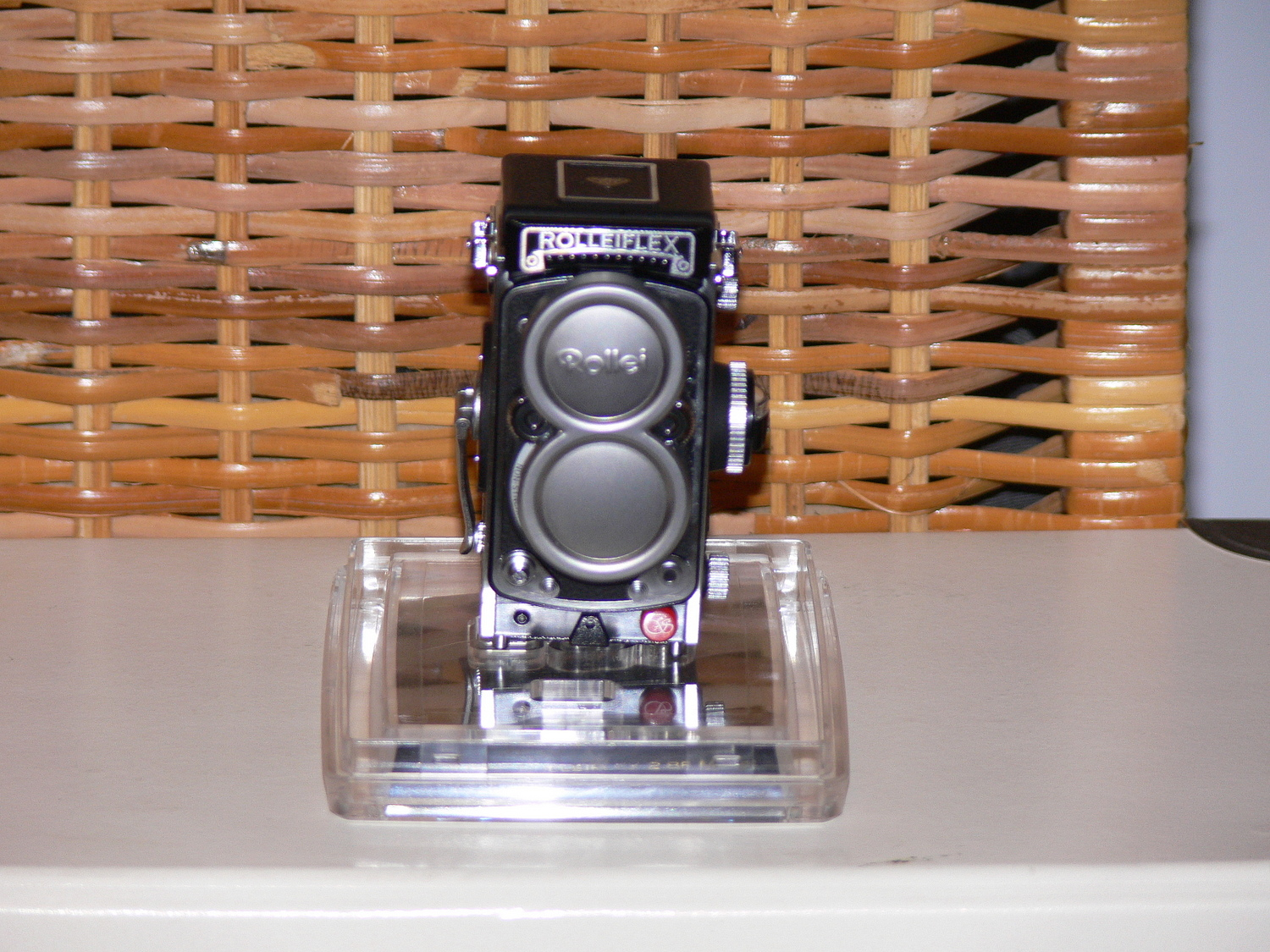
Minox rebadged Sharan Rolleiflex 2.8F film camera

Minox briefly expanded its range of 8×11 models by offering Minox-badged cameras styled as miniatures of famous classic film cameras of the past, manufactured by Sharan Megahouse of Japan, including:

- Leica If
- Leica IIIf
- Leica M3
- Rolleiflex TLR
- Zeiss Contax I
- Hasselblad SWC.

All these retro cameras are equipped with 15mm F5.6 triplet lens, and 1/250 sec shutter. Using Minox film in Minox cassette, image size 8x11mm.

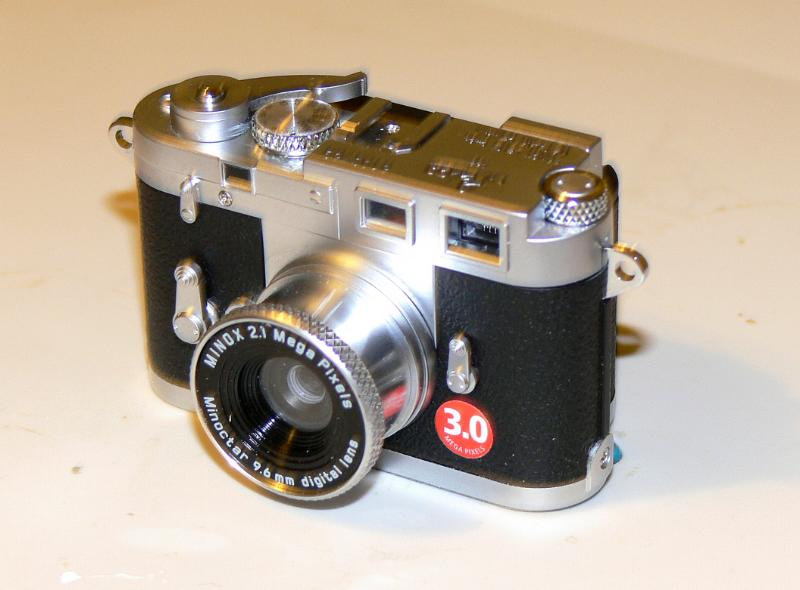
Minox M3 3Mpix digital miniature retro camera

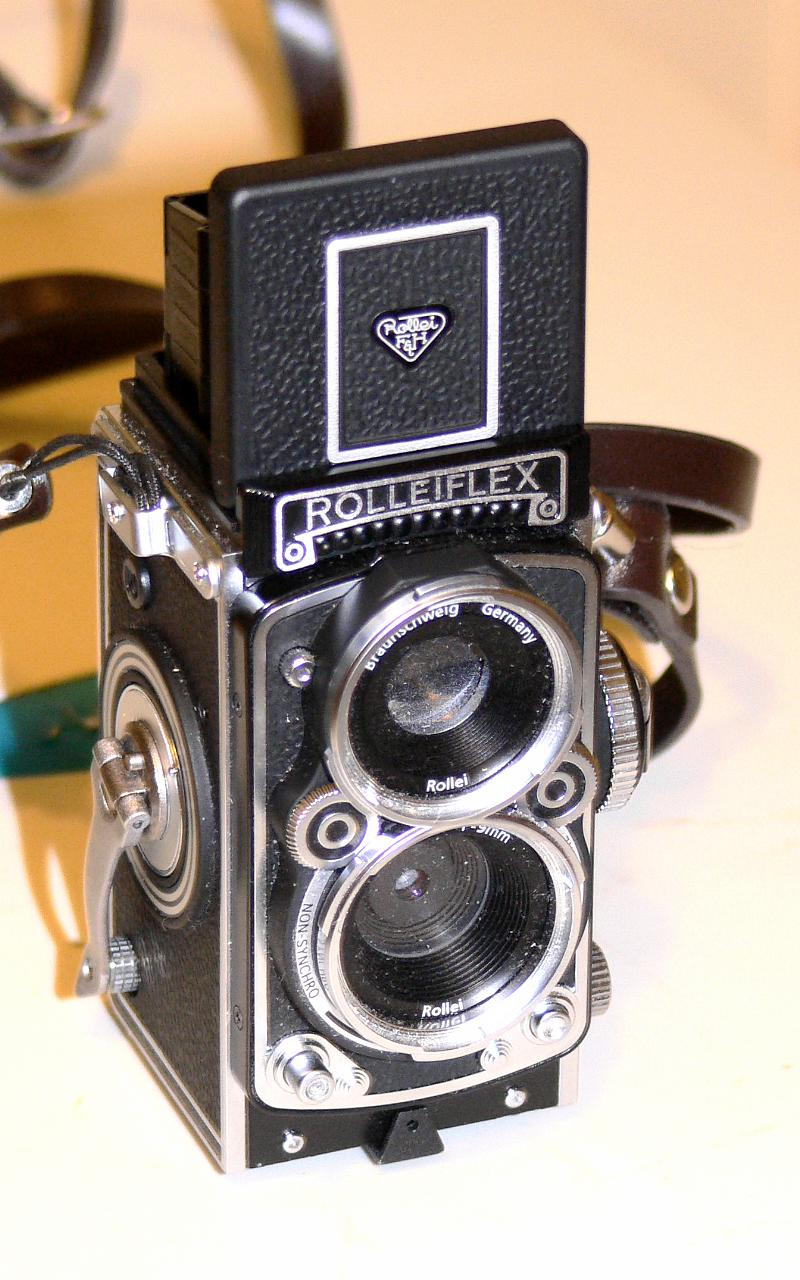
Minox Rolleiflex mindigi 3Mpix digital miniature retro camera

=== Minox digital cameras ===
Later, a range of digital cameras was offered.

==== Digital miniature retro cameras ====
The digital camera offerings also included similar miniature retro cameras to the 8x11-based models:

- DCC Rolleiflex AF 5.0
- DCC Minox Leica M3
- Rolleiflex minidigi (out of production)
- DCC 5.1 (2011)
- DCC Minox 5.1 Coloured (2012) DCC 5.1 Colour Collection
- DCC 14mp (2013) Minox 2013 catalogue 2013 DCC 14mp

==== Minox DSC subminiature digital camera ====
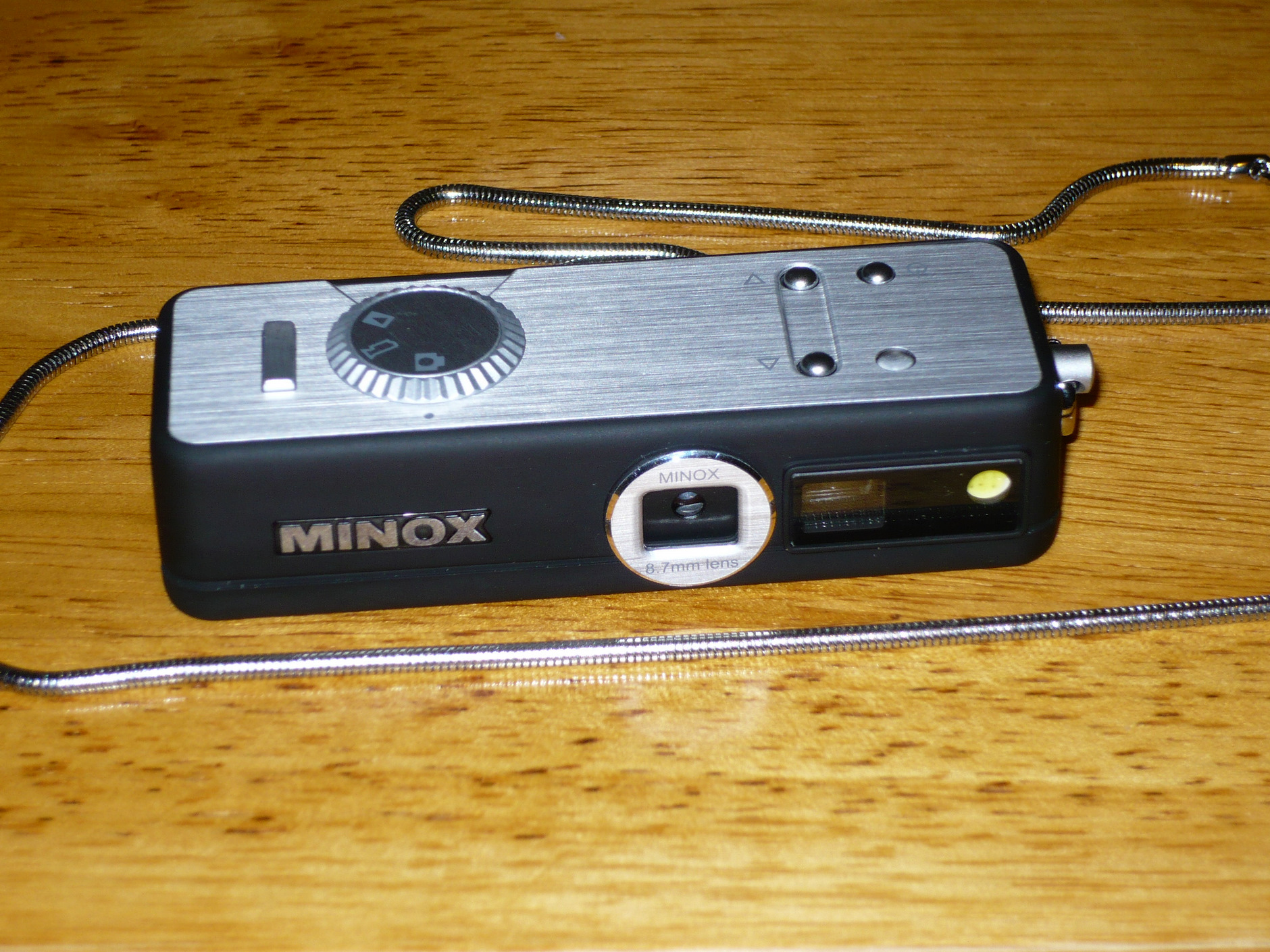
Minox DSC (black)

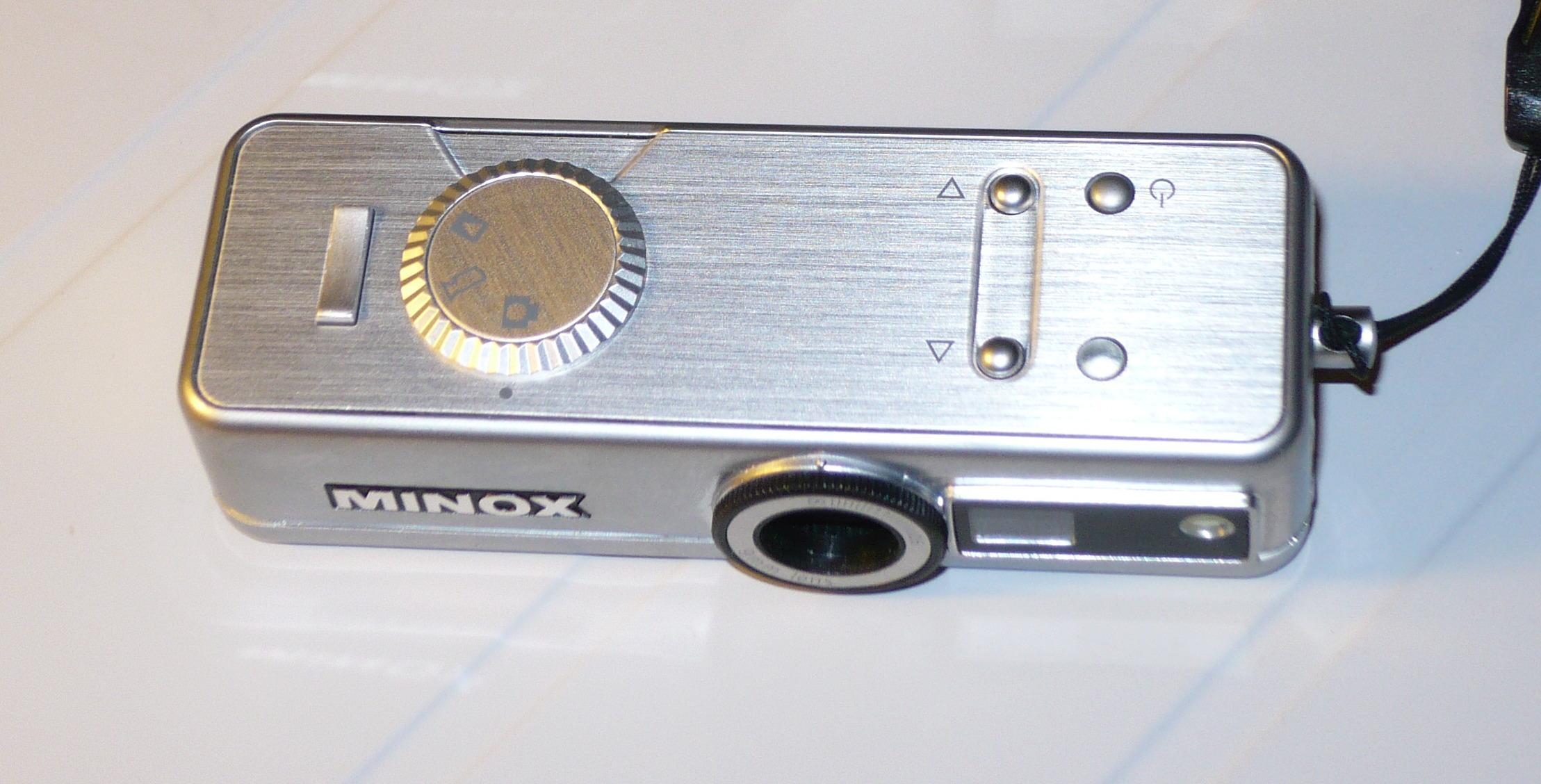
Minox DSC (silver)

At photokina in 2008, Minox announced a new subminiature digital camera called the DSC, (Digital Spy Camera) with a 3 megapixel sensor that outputs 5 megapixel interpolated images. It includes some design cues of the Minox LX but otherwise does not resemble the original cameras.

- Minox DSC silver, with 9.0mm/F2.0 focusing lens, 0.6M,1M and infinity

=== Current products ===
Minox currently produces optics for nature and wildlife observation, for marine and water sports purposes, and for hunting.

- Binoculars
- Riflescopes
- Digital trail cameras (nature and wildlife observation cameras)
- Spotting scopes
- Night vision equipment
- Macroscopes

== See also ==
- Walter Zapp
- VEF
- List of digital camera brands
