= Zapper (company) =

South African fintech

- Type: Private
- Industry: Fintech
- Founded: 2013; 13 years ago
- Founder: David de Villiers
- Headquarters: Cape Town, South Africa
- Key people: Mike Bryer (CEO)
- Services: Payment facilitation Market insights Customer loyalty platform Business capital Digital invoicing
- Website: zapper.com

Screenshot of the homepage of the Zapper app

Zapper is a South African fintech company and payment service provider. The company was founded in 2013, and is headquartered in Cape Town.

Zapper develops a proprietary mobile payment platform, with QR code-based payments and tap to pay functionality. It also has integrations with POS systems, and offers an ecommerce gateway, market insights, a customer loyalty platform, parking payments, API integrations, digital invoicing, and business capital funding.

The company has integrated with 31,000 South African merchants, as of 2026.

== History ==
Zapper was founded in Durban by David de Villiers, in November 2013, with funding from an unnamed investor. De Villiers was previously the Head of IT at Investec, a South African private bank. The company began offering commercial services in 2014.

In July 2017, Zapper partnered with Alipay, which was the world's largest mobile payment platform at the time. The partnership allowed the Alipay users to pay via Zapper within the Alipay app, when visiting Zapper-enabled merchants in South Africa.

In 2020, Zapper was operating in 12 markets around the world, and had around 300 employees. Zapper had between 20,000 and 25,000 active merchants, and was adding around 400 merchants a month. Around 10,000 of Zapper's existing merchants were in South Africa, with most of the remainder located in the UK and US.

In November 2020, it was announced that the following month, Huawei would launch its mobile payment system, Huawei Pay, in South Africa, in partnership with Zapper. At the time, Huawei Pay did not support NFC payments, but the company was working on launching that feature as well.

In November 2021, it was announced that customers of South African commercial bank FNB, and local private bank RMB, would be able to use the scan to pay feature on their banking apps to pay via Zapper QR codes.

In May 2022, Zapper launched new functionality allowing sellers using the Zapper Merchant app to accept payments from customers using NFC. These tap-on-phone payments could be accepted by merchants regardless of whether their customers had the Zapper app. The new feature added on to existing payment acceptance methods including mobile wallets, vouchers, and cryptocurrency.

In October 2024, Zapper partnered with cryptocurrency company Luno, enabling users to pay via the Luno app when scanning a Zapper QR code, up to a R100,000 per-transaction value.

== Operations ==
As of 2025, Zapper has mobile app partners including Absa, Capitec, FNB, Nedbank, GoTyme Bank, MTN Momo, and VodaPay.

The company has partnered with 31,000 merchants across SA, as of 2026. Its platform is neutral, and the business does not have an affiliation with a commercial bank.

== See also ==
- Cape Town tech industry
- Banking in South Africa
- Economy of South Africa
