= Walter Zapp =

Baltic German inventor (1905–2003)

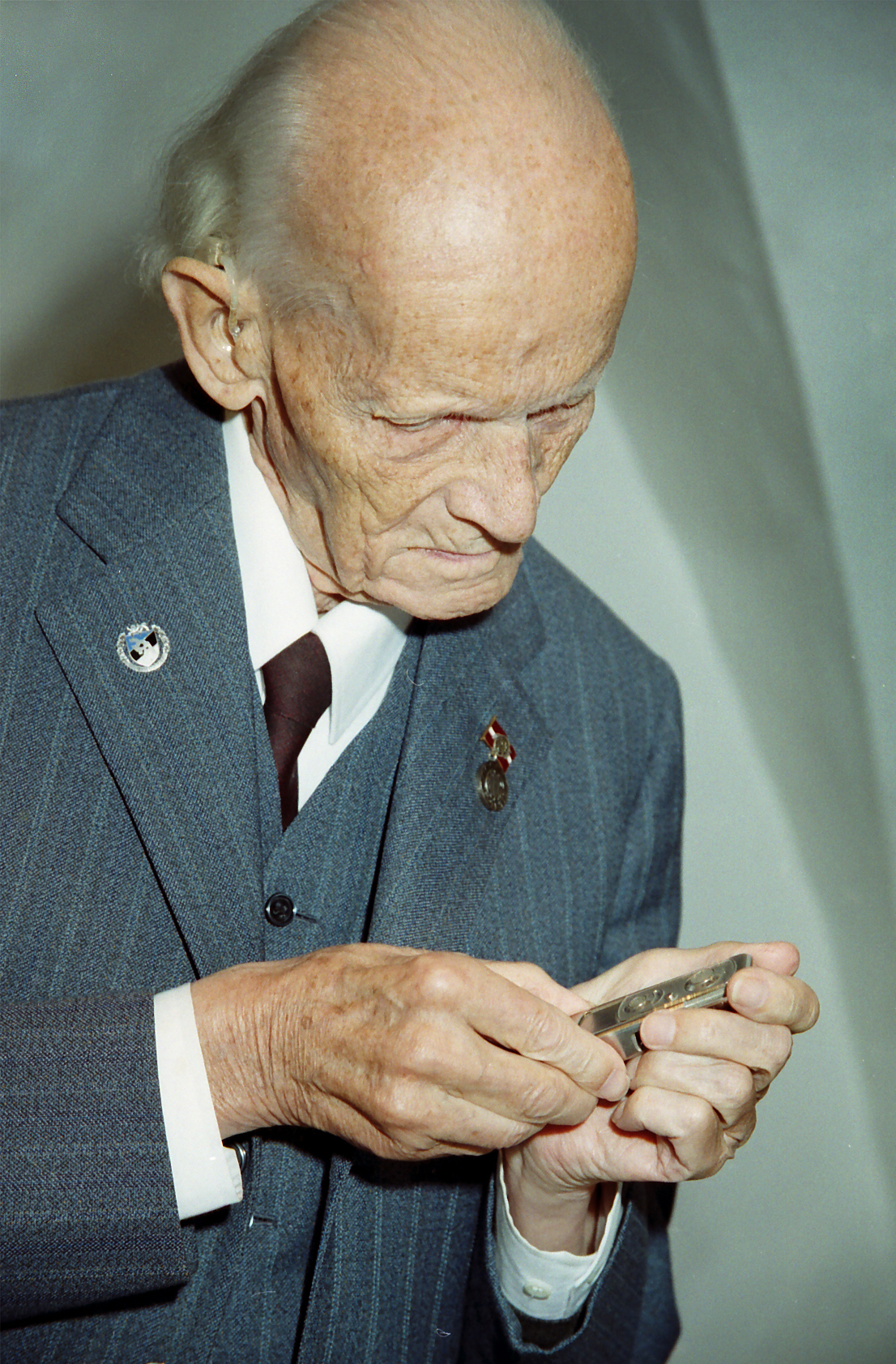
- Walter Zapp (2000)
- Born: 4 September [O.S. 22 August] 1905; Riga, Russian Empire (now Latvia)
- Died: 17 July 2003 (aged 97); Binningen, Switzerland
- Occupation: Inventor
- Employer(s): Valsts Elektrotehniskā Fabrika (VEF); Minox GmbH
- Known for: Invention of Minox subminiature camera

Walter Zapp (Latvian: Valters Caps; 4 September [O.S. 22 August] 1905 – 17 July 2003) was a Baltic German inventor. His best-known creation was the Minox subminiature camera. Over the course of his life, he was granted over 60 patents.

== Biography ==
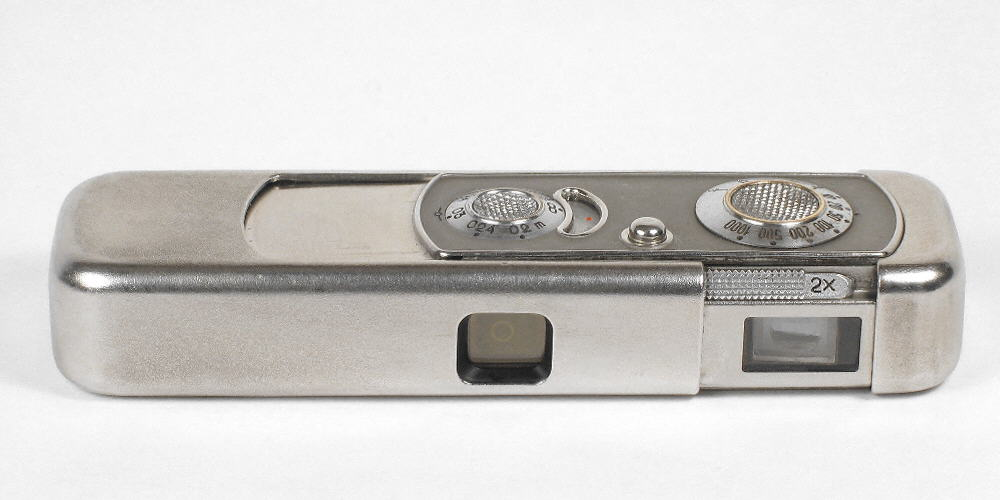
Minox Riga camera made by VEF

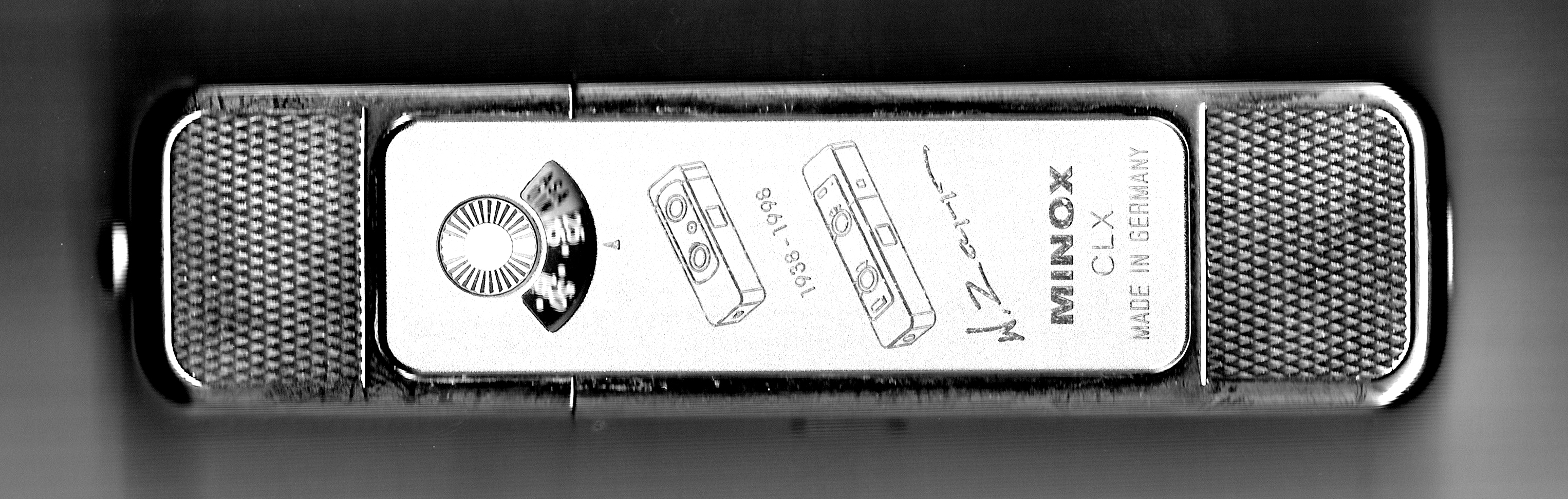
Limited edition Minox CLX camera, with Walter Zapp signature

Zapp was born in Riga, Governorate of Livonia (now Latvia) to a Baltic German mother and a British father. In 1932, while living in Estonia, he began developing the then subminiature camera by first creating wooden models, which led to the first prototype in 1936. It was introduced to the market in 1938. Minox cameras were made by VEF (Valsts Elektrotehniskā Fabrika) in Latvia. VEF made 17,000 Minox cameras.

During the Spring 1941 Resettlement of Baltic Germans, Zapp moved to Germany. From 1941 to 1945, he worked on the development of electron microscopy at AEG in Berlin.

After World War II, in 1945, he founded the Minox GmbH in Wetzlar, Germany. The company still exists.

In 2001, when he went to Latvia for the last time, he said that he had gone to celebrate his 100th birthday in Latvia. He died aged 97, in Binningen near Basel, Switzerland.

== Patents ==
The innovative design and technical solutions of Zapp's camera were patented around the world. VEF received 66 patents in 18 countries for Zapp's inventions. In the 1960s, Zapp was named as the inventor in several patents granted to Minox GmbH for improvements and modifications of a subminiature camera. In the beginning of the 1990s, Zapp patented his last invention, the Minox T8 pocket telescope.

== Publications ==
Walter Zapp (1944). "Ein russisches Galvanometer". Physikalische Blätter (in German). 1 (9): 138–140. doi:10.1002/phbl.19440010907.

== Awards and honors ==
In 2001, Walter Zapp received an honorary doctorate of the Latvian Academy of Sciences and was decorated with the Order of the Cross of Terra Mariana for his special services to the Republic of Estonia. Eesti Post has issued a Europa postage stamp in 1994 to commemorate Walter Zapp and his patented invention (Estonian patent No. 2628), the Minox subminiature camera.

== See also ==
- Minox
- VEF
