= ZC3HAV1 =

Protein-coding gene in the species Homo sapiens

Identifiers
- Aliases: ZC3HAV1, ARTD13, FLB6421, PARP13, ZAP, ZC3H2, ZC3HDC2, zinc finger CCCH-type containing, antiviral 1
- External IDs: OMIM: 607312; MGI: 1926031; GeneCards: ZC3HAV1
Available structures
PDB	Ortholog search: PDBe RCSB
PDB	List of PDB id codes 2X5Y, 4X52

Gene location (Human)
Chr.	Chromosome 7 (human)
Band	7q34	Start	139,043,515 bp
Band	7q34	End	139,132,122 bp

Gene location (Mouse)
Chr.	Chromosome 6 (mouse)
Band	6 B1|6 17.72 cM	Start	38,282,221 bp
Band	6 B1|6 17.72 cM	End	38,331,538 bp
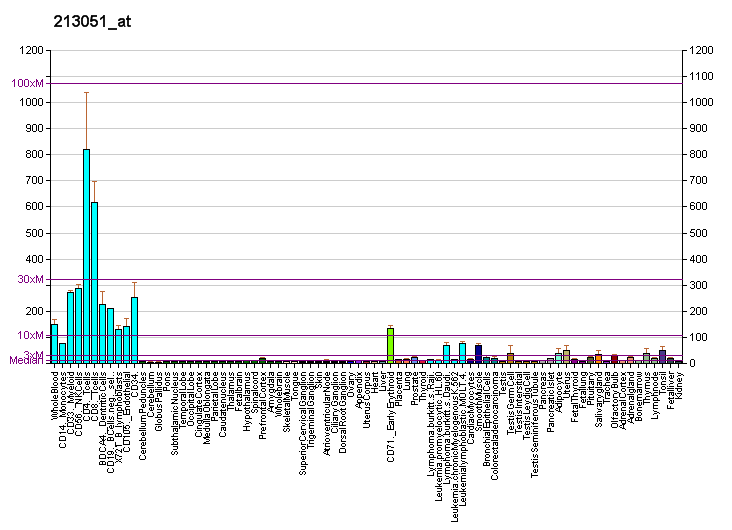
RNA expression pattern
Bgee	Human / Mouse (ortholog); Top expressed in: trabecular bone; endothelial cell; visceral pleura; blood; Epithelium of choroid plexus; parietal pleura; jejunal mucosa; pancreatic ductal cell; superficial temporal artery; bronchial epithelial cell / Top expressed in: Paneth cell; endothelial cell of lymphatic vessel; mesenteric lymph nodes; blood; granulocyte; cumulus cell; transitional epithelium of urinary bladder; spleen; hair follicle; bone marrow; More reference expression data
BioGPS	More reference expression data
Gene ontology
Molecular function	metal ion binding; protein binding; RNA binding; cadherin binding; NAD+ ADP-ribosyltransferase activity; NAD+ binding; protein ADP-ribosylase activity
Cellular component	cytoplasm; nucleus; cytosol
Biological process	positive regulation of interferon-alpha production; immune system process; response to virus; positive regulation of mRNA catabolic process; negative regulation of viral genome replication; positive regulation of RIG-I signaling pathway; defense response to virus; positive regulation of I-kappaB kinase/NF-kappaB signaling; innate immune response; positive regulation of interferon-beta production; protein poly-ADP-ribosylation; protein ADP-ribosylation
Sources:Amigo / QuickGO
Orthologs
Databases	NCBI: entry; OMA: entry
Species	Human	Mouse
Entrez	56829	78781
Ensembl	ENSG00000105939	ENSMUSG00000029826
UniProt	Q7Z2W4	Q3UPF5
RefSeq (mRNA)	NM_020119; NM_024625; NM_001363491	NM_028421; NM_028864; NM_001347122
RefSeq (protein)	NP_064504; NP_078901; NP_001350420	NP_001334051; NP_082697; NP_083140
Location (UCSC)	Chr 7: 139.04 – 139.13 Mb	Chr 6: 38.28 – 38.33 Mb
PubMed search
- Wikidata
View/Edit Human	View/Edit Mouse

Zinc finger antiviral protein (ZAP) or Zinc finger CCCH-type antiviral protein 1 is a protein that in humans is encoded by the ZC3HAV1 gene.

== Gene ==
Alternative splicing occurs at this locus and at least four isoform variants have been described with differing anti-viral activities. ZC3HAV1 has one close paralog, ZC3HAV1L that also has a winged helix domain (WHD) and zinc fingers.

== Function ==
This gene encodes a CCCH-type zinc finger protein that is thought to prevent infection by viruses by targeting viral RNA for degradation, inhibiting its translation as well as affecting programmed viral frameshifting. ZAP targets CpG rich RNA viral sequences. In addition to antiviral activities, ZAP has been reported to inhibit LINE and Alu retrotransposition.

While not sharing larger homologous regions, ZAP shares the uncommon CCCH zinc finger motif with tristetraprolin (TTP), which binds AU-rich elements (ARE) in RNA and promotes their degradation.

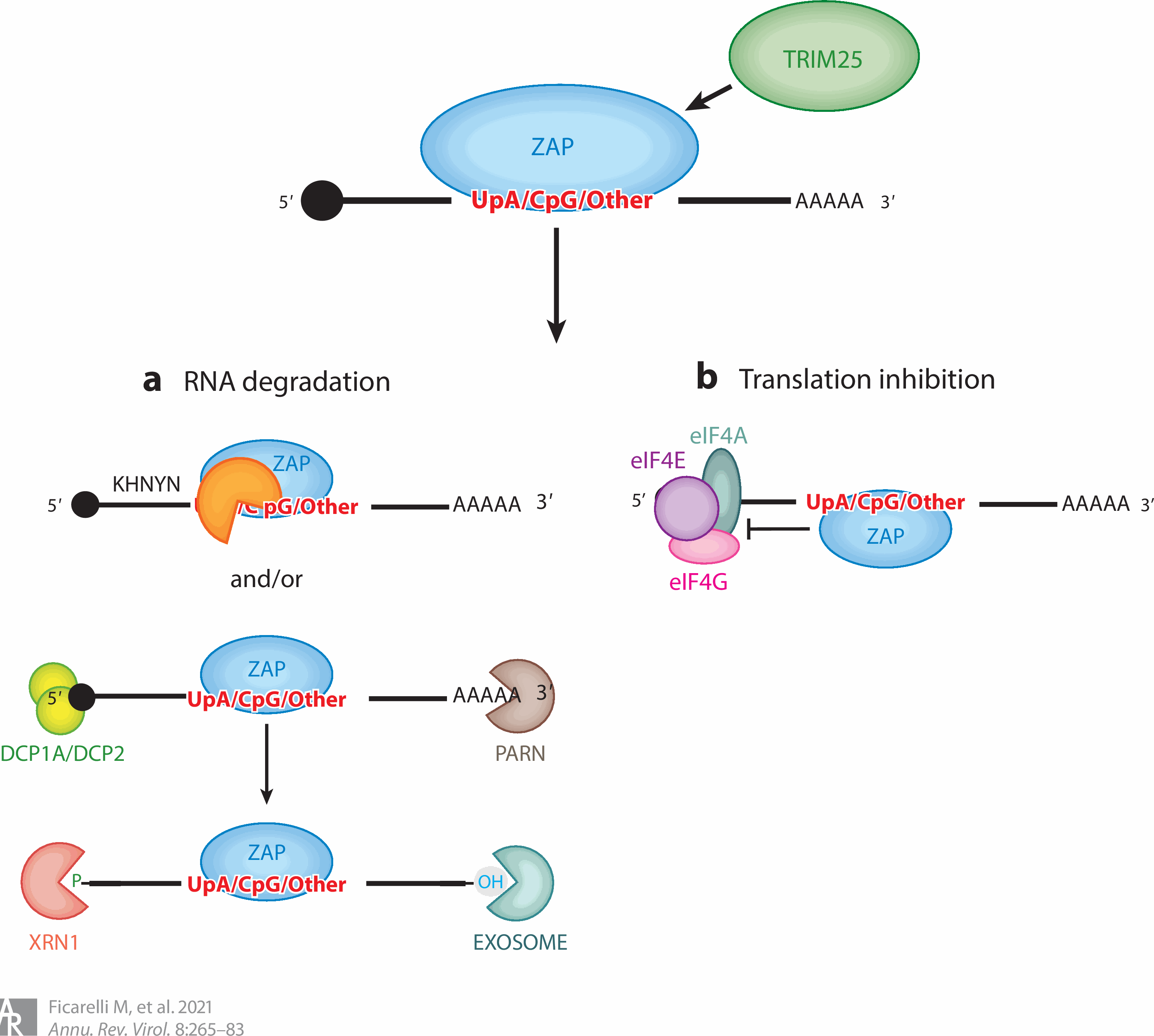
Mechanism of ZAP mediated repression of viral gene expression: ZAP binds to ZAP responsive element(ZRE)-containing viral RNA and, along with its cofactor TRIM25, can either (a) cause RNA degradation by interacting with the putative endonuclease KHNYN or (b) repress messenger RNA translation by inhibiting eIF4A and 4G

== Accessory proteins ==
Multiple ZAP cofactors have been reported to be required for antiviral activity. However the E3 ubiquitin ligase TRIM25 (tripartite motif protein 25) and KHNYN (KH-like and NYN domain-containing protein) have the most well documented evidence. TRIM25 has been shown to promote ZAP activity by multimerization through its RING domain whereas KHNYN acts an active nuclease for RNA cleavage which can be partially replaced functionally by its homolog N4BP1.

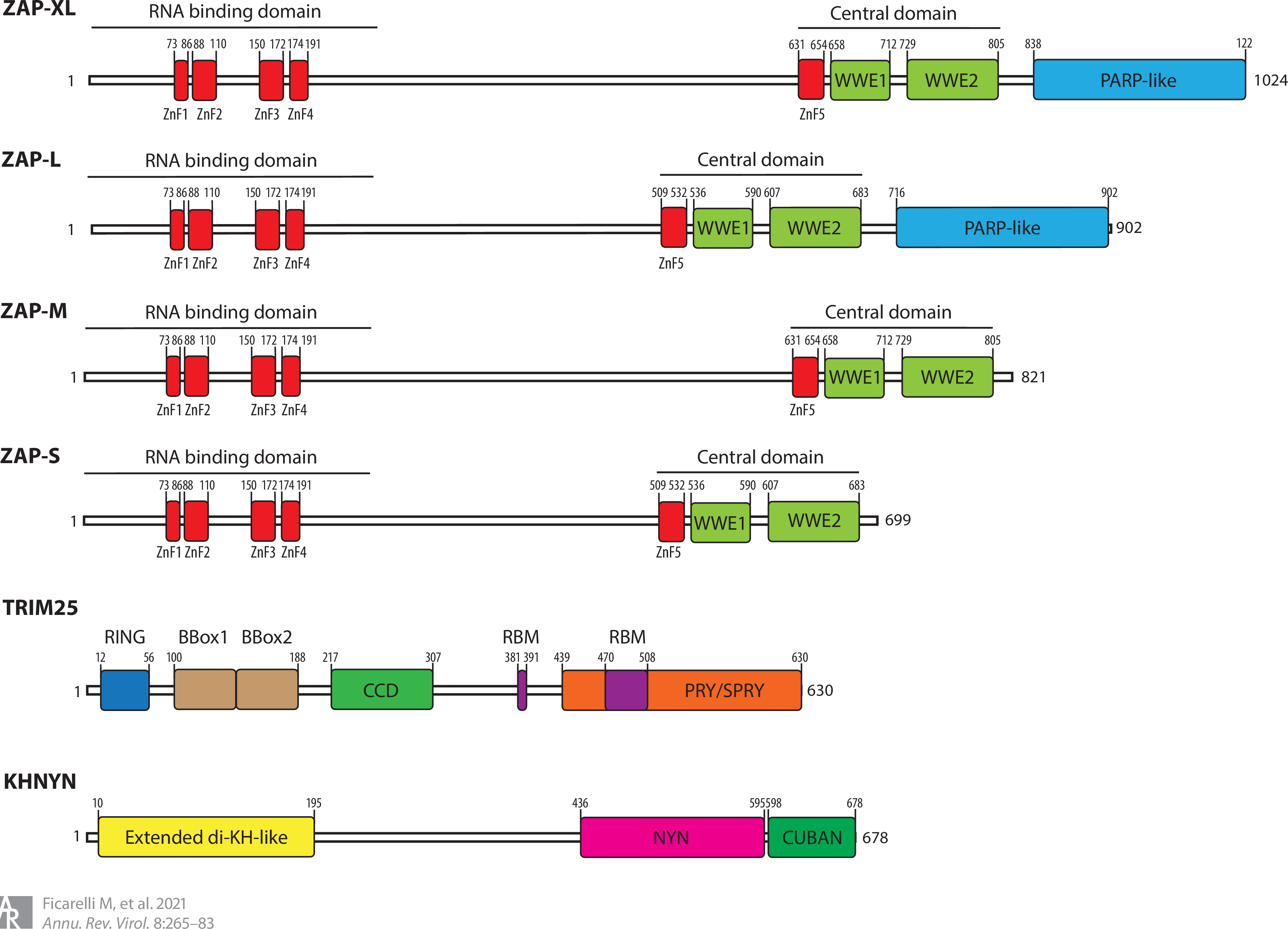
Schematic of all four ZAP isoforms and its accessory proteins TRIM25, and KHNYN, which are essential for antiviral activity

== Sensitive viruses ==
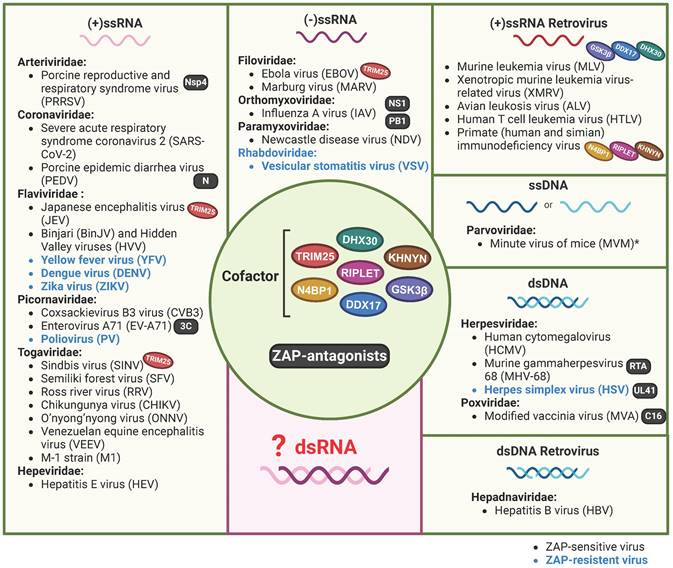
ZAP is a potentially broad-acting antiviral factor: Different classification of viruses are both ZAP-sensitive viruses are depicted in black, while ZAP-resistant viruses are in blue
