= Automated sales suppression device =

Software that falsifies cash register records

An automated sales suppression device or zapper is a software program that falsifies the electronic records of point of sale (POS) systems for the purpose of tax evasion.

== Function ==
Most jurisdictions levy a sales tax or a value added tax on commercial transactions such as sales in stores or food served in a restaurant. These transactions are now most often recorded by a POS system rather than a mechanical cash register. The POS system records are generally not alterable by the operator and are used as the basis of tax assessments and audits by tax authorities.

Because POS systems are increasingly designed as general purpose computers (as of 2008, 85% worldwide were reported to run Microsoft Windows), arbitrary software can be run on them. A "zapper" is a software program, often run untraceable from a USB flash drive, that accesses the POS system records and allows the owner of a business to alter the records so as to make it credibly appear that fewer transactions have occurred than has actually been the case.

The use of "zappers" reduces the tax burden on the business, which is generally proportional to the volume of the transactions. It also allows the business to withhold any sales tax or value-added tax that would be owed to the government for the suppressed transactions, and to keep this money for itself.

== Government responses ==
The use of zappers is illegal and may be subject to criminal penalties. However, according to a 2008 The New York Times report, governments worldwide have yet to find effective means of preventing their use. A European Union committee on cash register fraud has been established, and legislation mandating tamper-proof POS systems has been proposed in Germany in 2008 (INSIKA) and introduced in Quebec, Canada, on September 1, 2010.

In Canada, legislation aimed at suppressing zappers is in effect since 1 January 2014. A first offence will lead to a $5,000 fine, and subsequent infractions to a $50,000 fine. Persons in possession of zappers could be fined up to $50,000, and developers or sellers up to $100,000.

In Australia, activities involving electronic sales suppression tools that relate to people or businesses that have Australian tax obligations are banned since 4 October 2018, and subject to criminal and administrative penalties.

In Russia, the electronic secure memory device (EKLZ) was made mandatory to be part of any cash register. Then, new online cash registers use a combination of the special secure fiscal storage and the immediate transmission of the data to the tax service. These measures make it impossible to remove the data from the memory of the cash register.

In 2021, the state of Massachusetts drafted provisions into their budget establishing penalties for the use of selling, purchasing, installing, or possessing zappers. Selling (or offering for sale) zappers will incur a fine of up to $25,000 for the first offense and up to $50,000 for subsequent offenses; purchasing, installing, or possessing a zapper will incur a first-time fine of up to $10,000, and up to $25,000 for subsequent offenses.
