= Spidola =

Spidola may refer to:

- Spīdola (or Spīdala), a witch from the Latvian national epic poem Lāčplēsis
- VEF Spidola, the first Soviet mass-produced transistor manufactured by VEF
- Spidola (submarine), a Ronis-class submarine of the Latvian Navy
- Spīdola Award, an award presented by the Latvian Culture Foundation; see Roberts Zīle
- Spidola (Latvian ship), a Latvian merchant ship that was taken over by Germany in World War II
- Spīdola (sorority), Latvian national sorority
