= VEF I-19 =

Latvian fighter aircraft project

The VEF I-19 was a 1939 Latvian fighter aircraft designed by Karlis Irbitis, based on the earlier I-16 platform. It was never built after the Soviet occupation of Latvia in 1940.

== See also ==
- VEF

Related development

- VEF I-16
