= VEF =

Manufacturing company based in Latvia

Valsts elektrotehniskā fabrika (VEF)

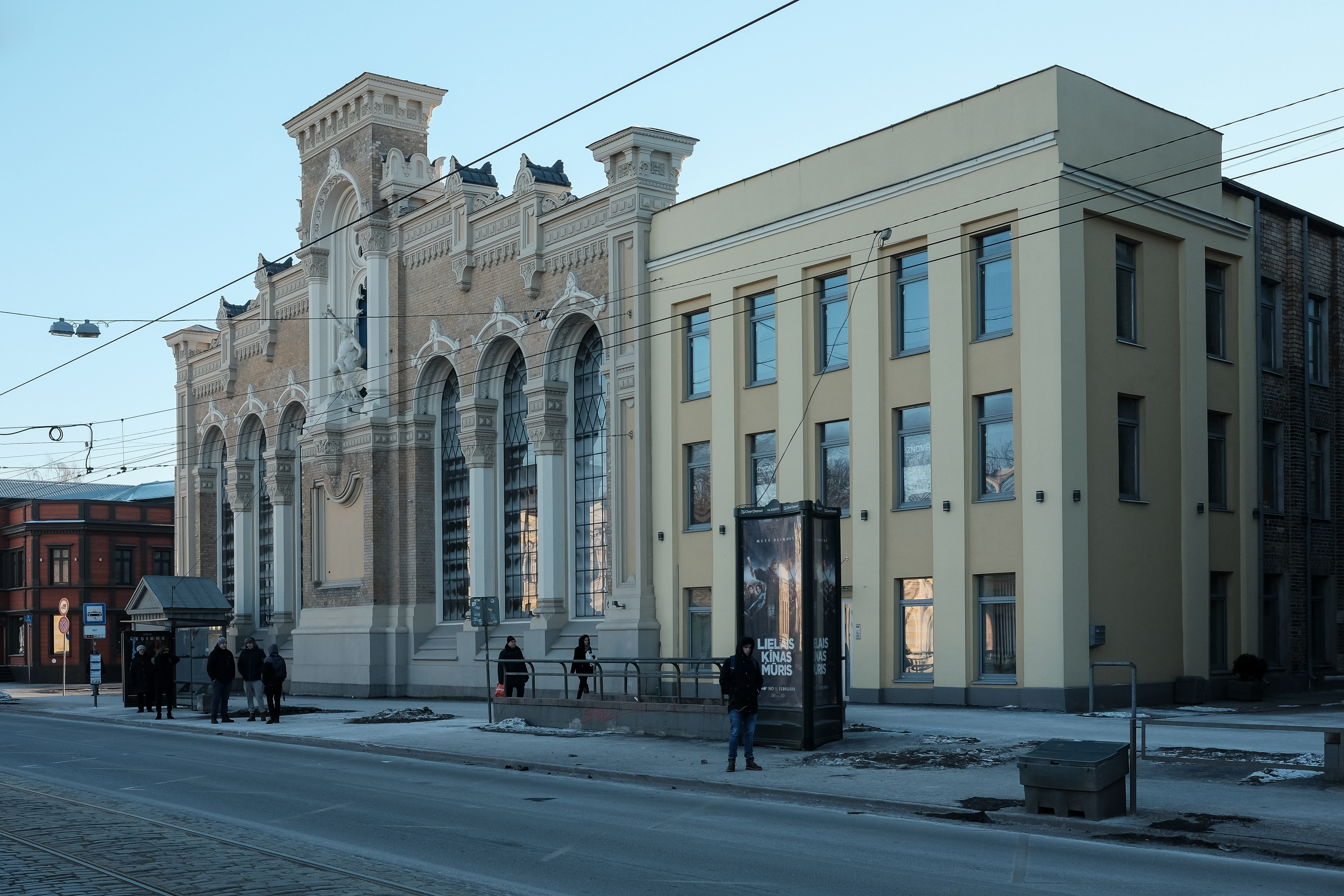
- Street view of the oldest building of VEF in 2017. Built by architect Heinrich Scheel in 1899
- Type: Public
- Industry: Electronics, telecommunications, radio receivers, photography, aircraft
- Founded: 1919
- Defunct: 1999
- Headquarters: Riga, Latvia
- Area served: Interwar Latvia (1918–1940), Soviet Union (1940–1991), Latvia (1991–1999)
- Products: Minox, VEF Spidola, VEF I-11, etc
- Number of employees: 4000 (1938)

VEF, Latvian acronym for Valsts elektrotehniskā fabrika (State Electrotechnical Factory), was a manufacturer of electrical and electronic products in Riga, Latvia. It was founded in 1919. Before World War II, it manufactured a large variety of goods, including Minox — then the world's smallest camera. After the war, it was the leading communication technology producer in the Soviet Union and the largest factory in the Latvian SSR.

== History ==
VEF was established in April 1919 as The Main Workshops of the Latvian Post and Telegraph Department (Latvian: Pasta un telegrāfa virsvaldes galvenā darbnīca (PTVGD)), where, initially, the five mechanics were the only employees. In 1924 the factory was moved for the first time, and in 1928 moved again to VEF's current location. The factory buildings were built in late 19th and early 20th century and span a city block. Before World War I the buildings were owned by 1887-established Russian-Baltic factory UNION, established by Heinrich Dettmann. The company was renamed to VEF in 1932.

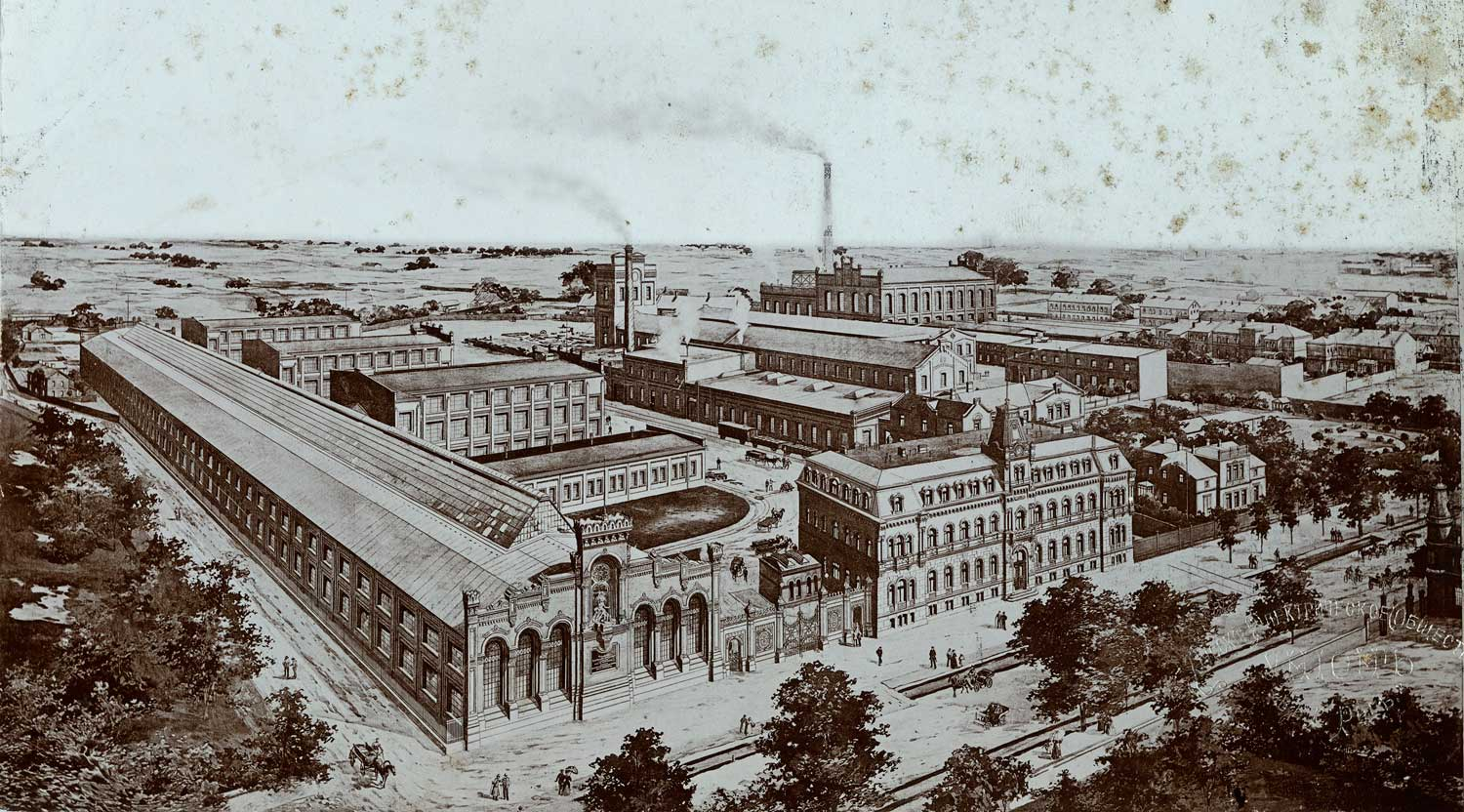
Factory 'Union' in 1908

In 1922 PTVGD started to manufacture phones. In 1924 it started producing crystal-detector radios. In 1928 it began producing automatic telephone exchanges. They bought the license from Mix & Genest to produce small volume (for 100, 200, 300 numbers) and large volume (1000, 2000 numbers) switchboards. Telephone exchange in Riga and Latvia's populated places were upgraded with equipment manufactured by PTVGD until 1940. During the 1930s the monthly production of PTVGD included 500 phones and 400 exchanges. By the 1930s the factory produced all electronics that had any market demand - communication devices, phones, light bulbs, cameras, irons, radios, flashlights, as well as photo paper, work-tables, and even airplanes. They also repaired cars.

In 1930, the enterprise acquired the plywood factory "Latvijas Bērzs," enabling the production of high-quality radio receiver casings and, starting in 1935, aircraft construction. VEF began manufacturing automatic telephone exchanges. It purchased a license from the German company Mix & Genest for producing small-capacity exchanges (100, 200, 300 numbers) and large-capacity exchanges (1000, 2000 numbers). By 1940, most telephone exchanges in Riga and other Latvian towns were produced by VEF.

VEF entered the world market in 1936 with the development of the Minox subminiature camera, designed by Walter Zapp (Latvian: Valters Caps). It was the world's smallest camera at the time.

Between 1928 and 1933 VEF also produced a small, inexpensive car.

VEF radio receivers became the factory’s flagship product. At international exhibitions in Brussels (1935) and Paris (1937), VEF-branded devices won Grand Prix awards. The factory produced so many radio receivers that the local market could not absorb them, leading to exports to other countries. Starting in 1935, VEF opened trade offices in Tallinn, Kaunas, Helsinki, Oslo, Zurich, and London. Before World War II, VEF exported 8,000 radio receivers annually.

During World War II the factory was looted and several buildings were destroyed by explosions. The factory was repaired after the war and it quickly recovered. During the 1960s VEF produced seven radio receivers and five phones every minute and two out of three phones in Soviet Union were produced by VEF. It also manufactured highly demanded transistor-based radios "Spīdola" and in the 1970s — "VEF".

During the Soviet period, VEF specialized in electronics and was a part of Latvia's electronic industry, which supplied the former Soviet Union with telecommunications equipment and electronics for the military. The five largest state companies were VEF, Radiotehnika, Elfa, Komutators and Elar (which produced components for the other four). In its peak in 1991, VEF employed 20,000 people. Its best known products were telephones, telephone exchanges and radios.

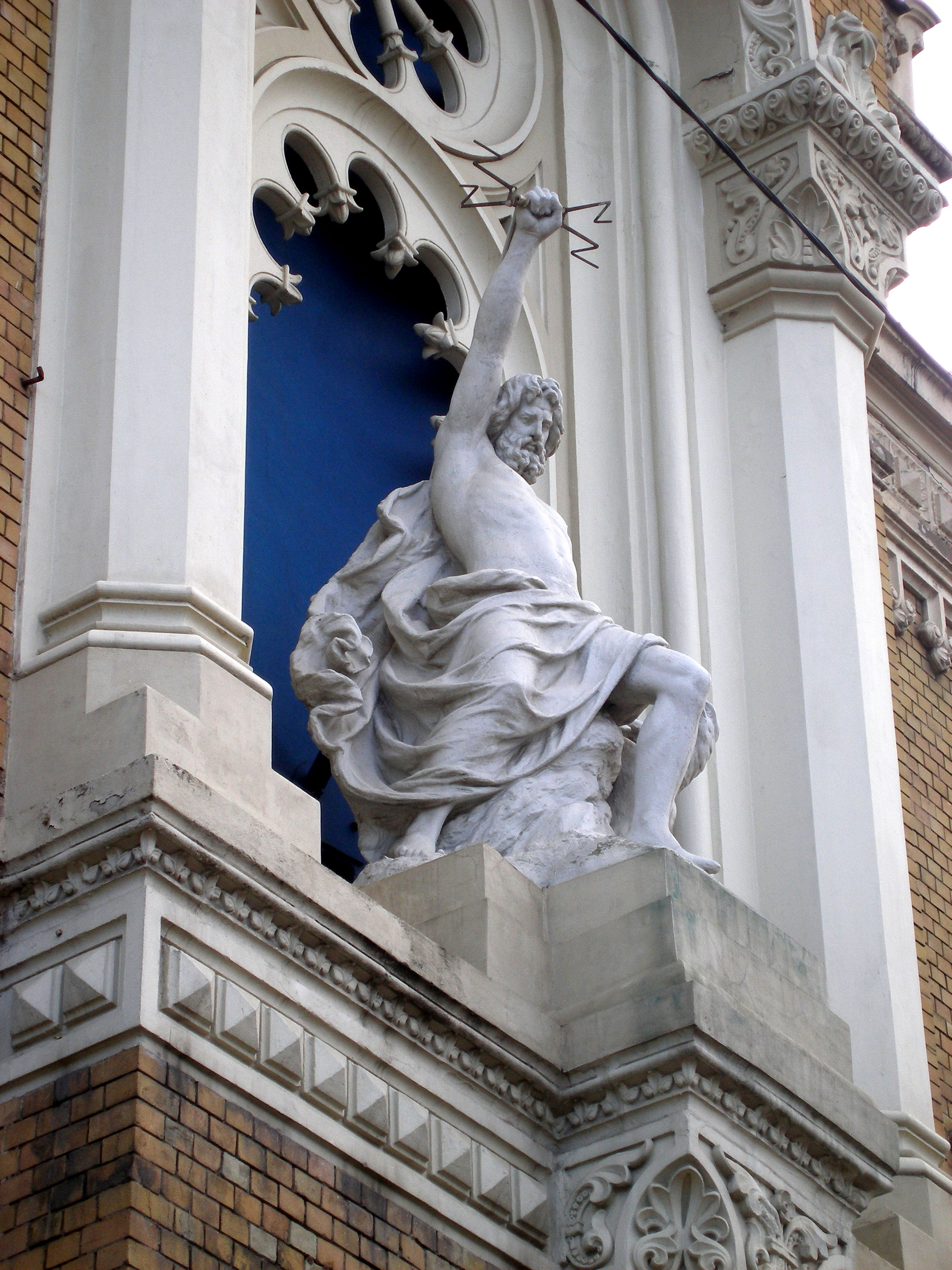
Zeus statue on the front façade of the main building. Sculptor August Volz

The Latvian electronics industry had trouble competing with Western companies when the markets were opened in the early 1990s. Cited problems included poor service and product quality. Attempts to restructure these companies were not successful and their combined production fell more than 90% between 1993 and 1997. VEF was divided into six smaller companies, most of which no longer exist. Three remaining ones, VEF un Ko, VEF TELEKOM and VEF Radiotehnika RRR, employ between 100 and 200 people each.

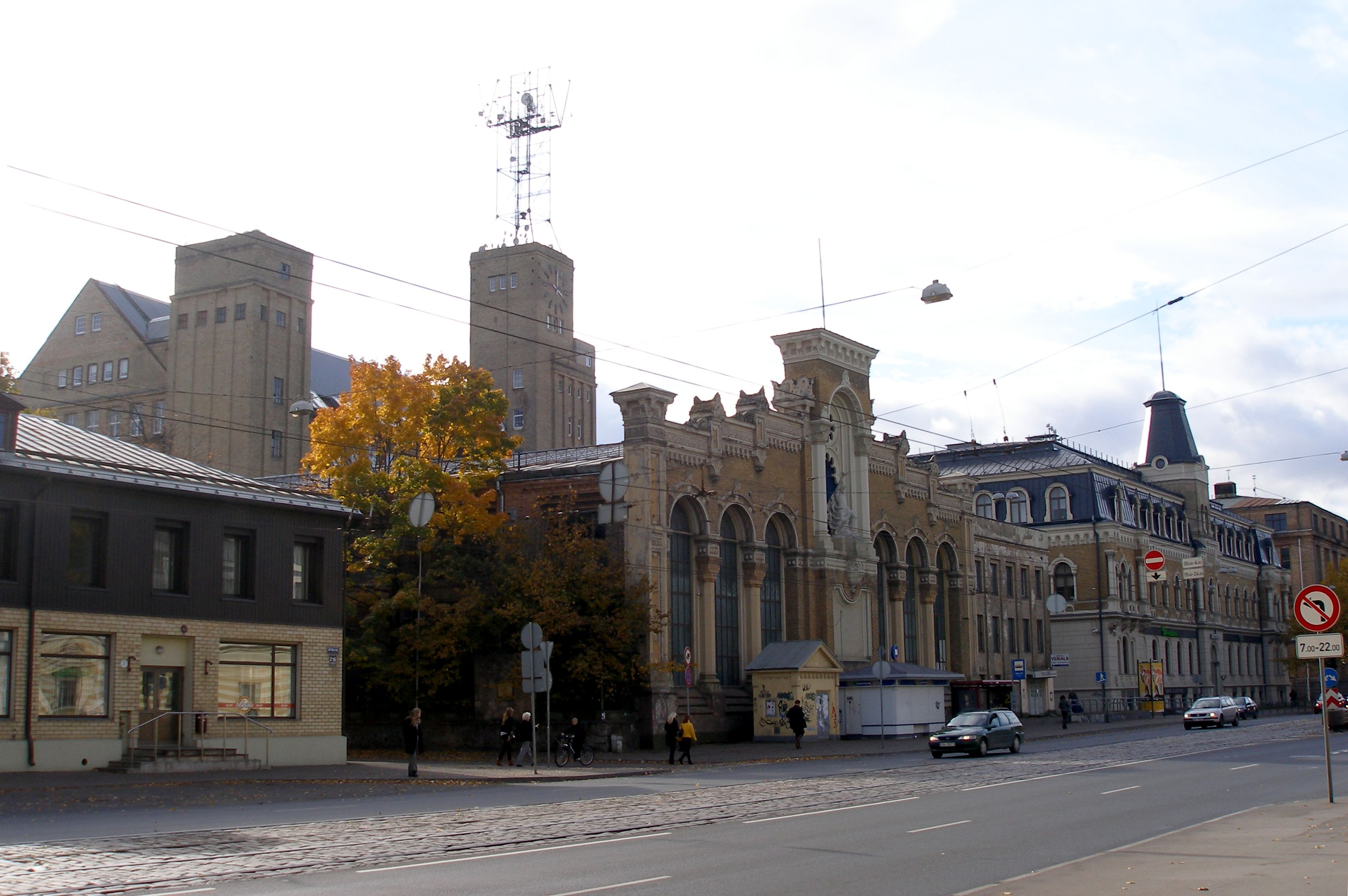
Main building in 2008 before renovation

In 1999 the factory was privatized and reorganized. VEF un Ko, which still is active, has recently focused its attention on designing and building UAVs for agricultural use.

== Building ==
The large assembly hall and administrative building, built in 1899 and designed by architect Heinrich Scheel (1829–1909), have eclectic facades facing Brīvības iela. The decorative facade of the assembly hall features a statue of Zeus with lightning bolts in hand. In 1912, a production building with a high tower in the courtyard, designed by German architect Peter Behrens (1868–1940), was constructed under the supervision of Riga civil engineer Friedrich Wilhelm Seuberlich (1850-?). In 1914, another production building was built according to Behrens' design, located at the corner of Brīvības iela and Bērzaunes iela, under the supervision of architect Friedrich Scheffel (1865–1915). The upper floor, which was supposed to be incorporated into the high roof as per the project, remained unrealized.

In 2017, the 1899 building was renovated by Latvian network hardware manufacturer MikroTik which established its headquarters there. The adjacent building, built in 1900, is also renovated and most notably used by Accenture Latvia since the 2000s. Since 2020, the building has housed Dr. Bubnovska Centrs, a physiotherapy and rehabilitation center specializing in kinesitherapy.

== Product line-up ==
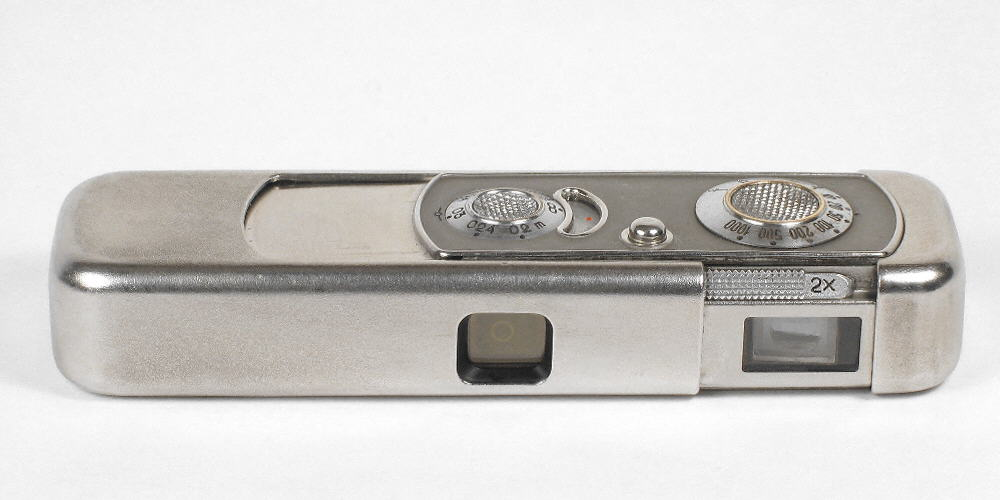
Minox subminiature camera

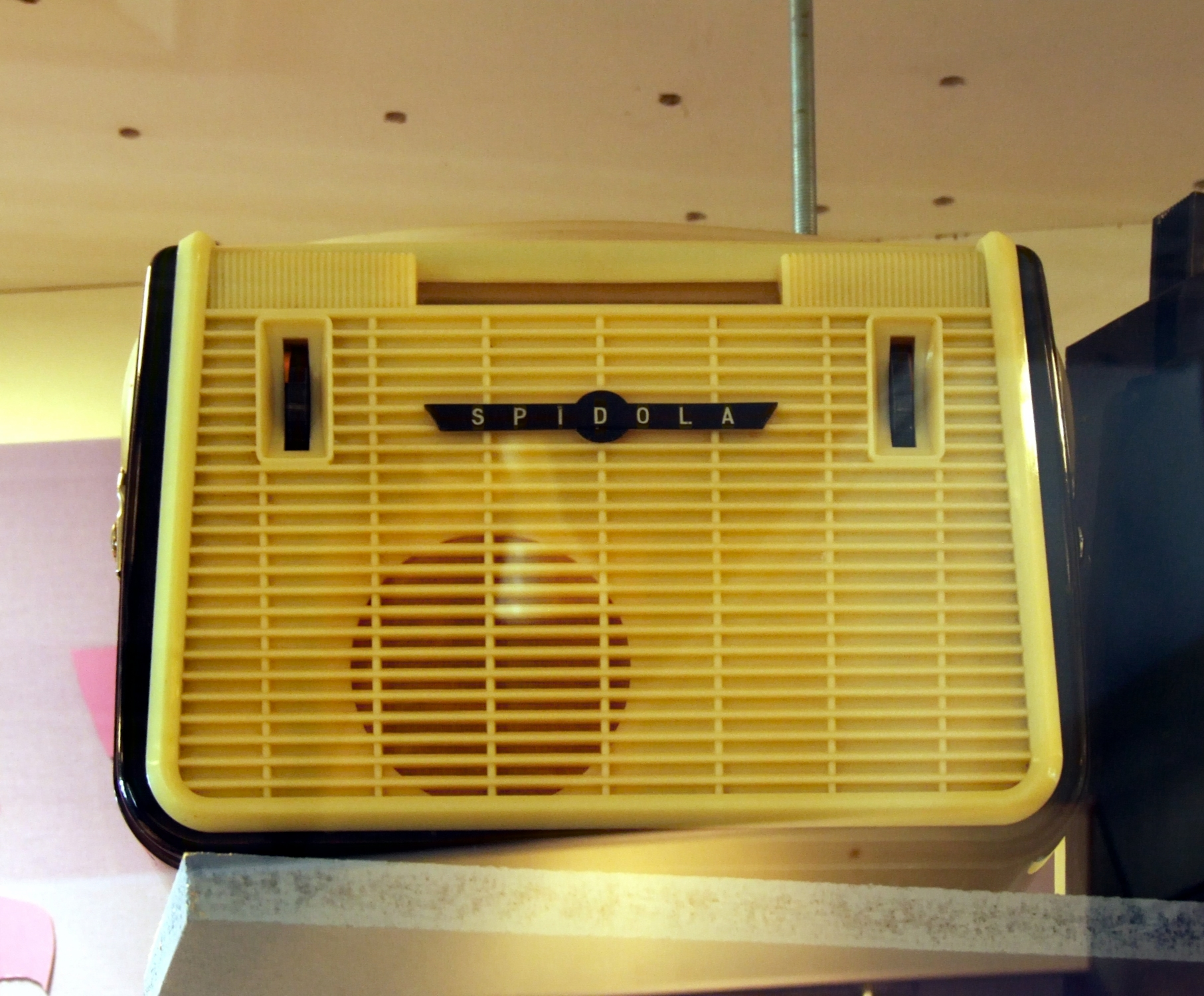
Spīdola, the first Soviet portable shortwave radio receiver

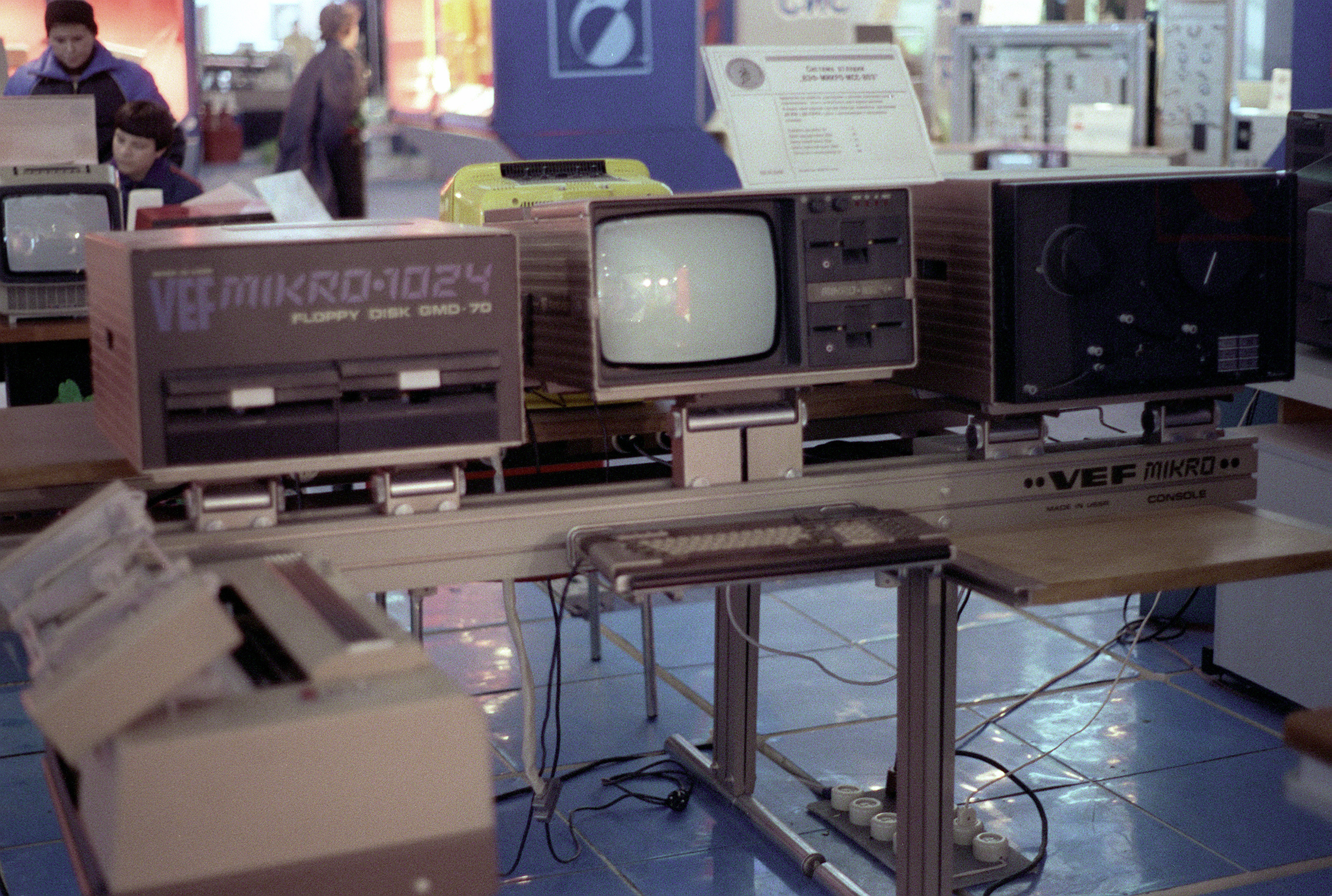
VEF-MIKRO 1024 personal computer

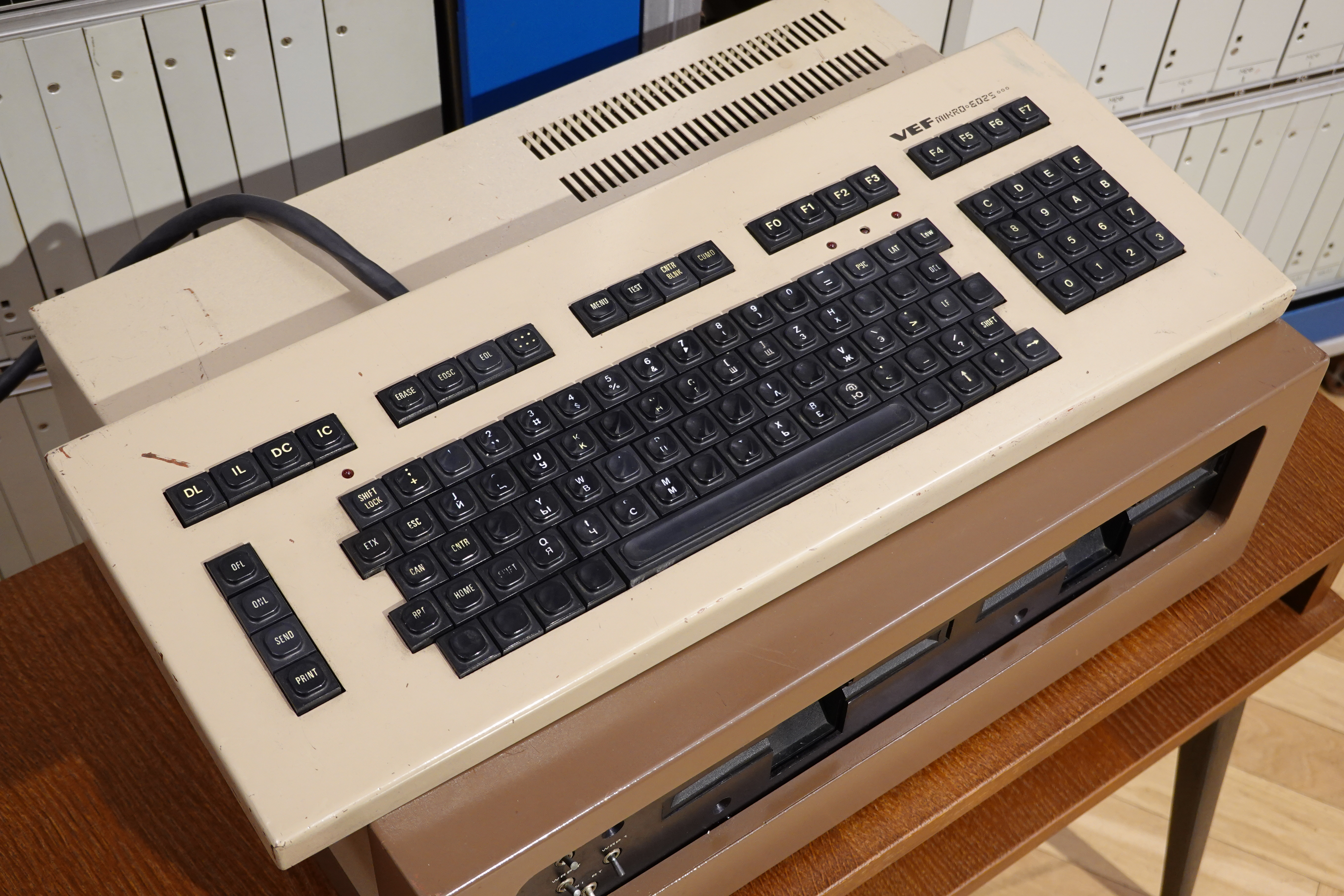
VEF-MIKRO 6025 computer keyboard

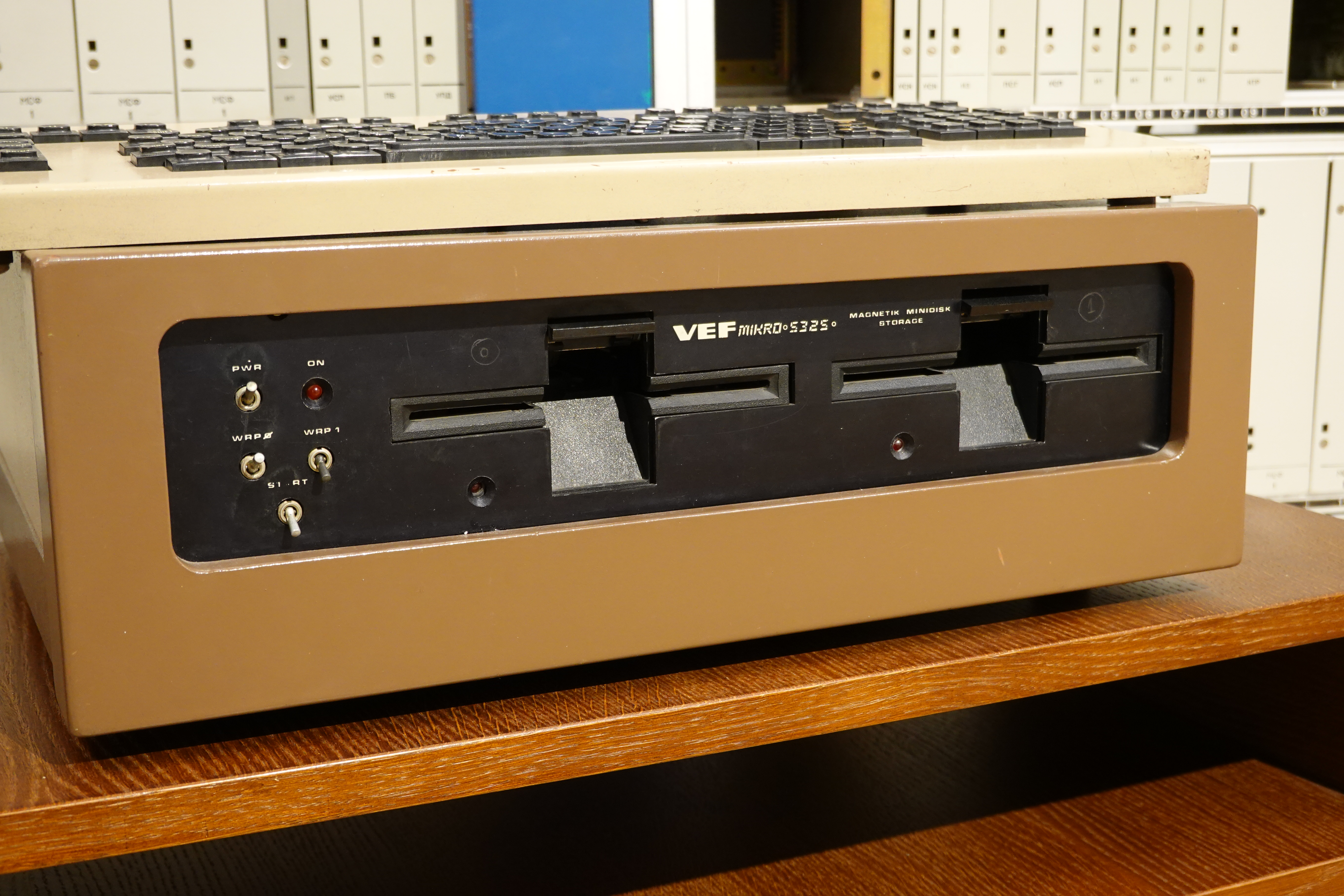
5.25" floppy disk Reader Mikro 5625

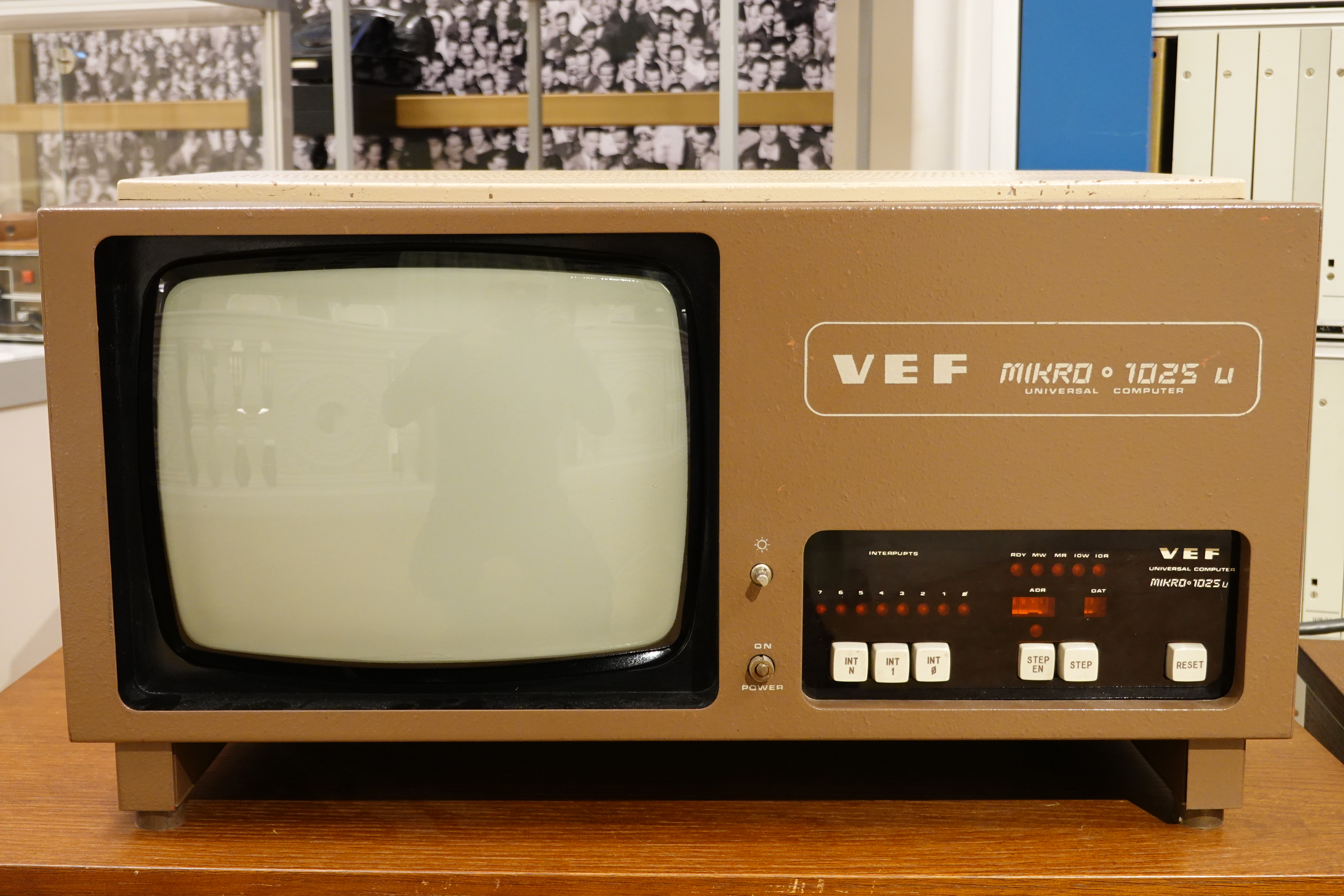
VEF-MIKRO 1025 personal computer

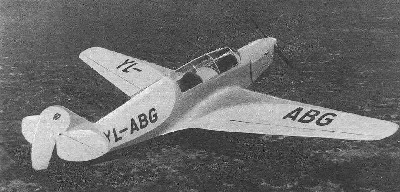
VEF I-12 airplane

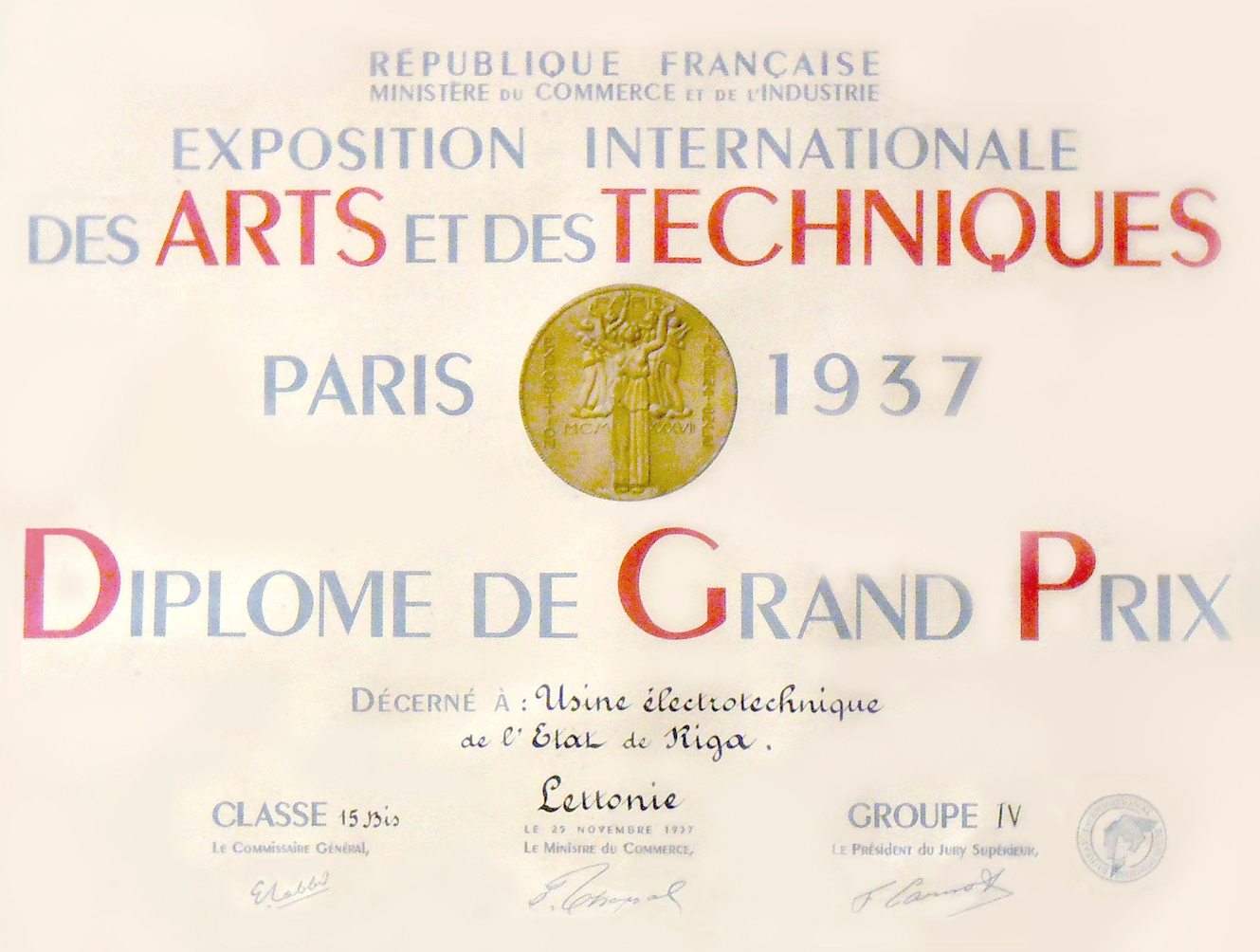
Grand Prix of the 1937 International Expo received by VEF

=== Cameras ===
- Minox

=== Radios ===
- Spīdola
- Vega VEF
- VEF Latvia
- VEF Abava

=== Phones ===
- VEF-TA

The VEF-TA had many different versions that ranged from classic style rotary phones to modern push button keypad.

=== Computers ===
- VEF ORMIKA
- VEF-1022
- VEF-MIKRO 1024
- VEF-MIKRO 1025

==== Computer hardware ====
- Mikro 6025 computer keyboard
- Mikro 5625 – 5.25" floppy disk reader

=== Aircraft ===
- VEF Irbītis I-11
- VEF Irbītis I-12
- VEF Irbītis I-14
- VEF Irbītis I-15
- VEF Irbītis I-16
- VEF Irbītis I-17
- VEF Irbītis I-18
- VEF Irbītis I-19
- VEF JDA-10M

=== Motorcycle ===
- Pandera (prototype, built 1938)

== See also ==
- Minox
- FC Daugava Riga
