= Kārlis Irbītis =

Latvian aircraft designer

- Born: October 14, 1904; Lāde Parish, Kreis Wolmar, Governorate of Livonia, Russian Empire (Now Latvia)
- Died: October 13, 1997 (aged 92); Saint-Laurent, Quebec, Canada
- Occupation: Airplane designer
- Known for: VEF I-16
- Awards: Bronze medal from the Latvian Aeroclub (1938); McCurdy Award for the VSTOL CL-84 project (1970)

Kārlis Irbītis (October 14, 1904, in Lāde parish, Governorate of Livonia – October 13, 1997, in Saint-Laurent, Quebec, Canada) was a Latvian aeroplane designer.

His greatest successes, for the VEF factory, were the sports plane VEF I-12 (1935) and the monoplane VEF I-16 (1939), used as a fighter aircraft. After World War II, when he had emigrated to Canada, he was the designer of the experimental Canadian vertical landing and take-off aeroplane, the CL-84 (1950).

== Aircraft designed by Kārlis Irbītis ==
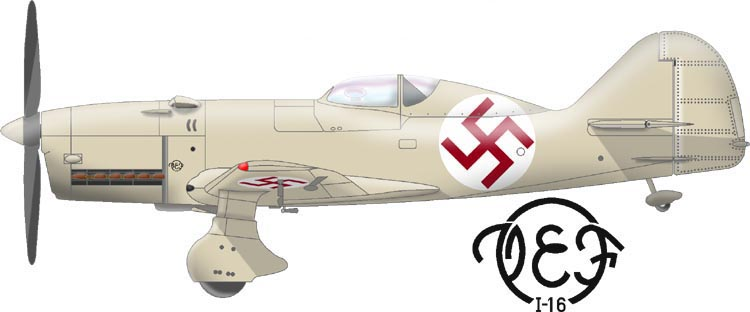
VEF I-16

- Irbītis I-1 Sprīdītis – sport, single-seat / Nikolajs Pūliņš & Kārlis Irbītis (P.2, I.1) 1925
- Irbītis I-2 Ikars / N. Pūliņš & K. Irbītis (P.3, I.2)
- Irbītis I-3 – by Herberts Runka
- Irbītis I-4 Vanadziņš / A.S. ″Christine Backman″
- Irbītis I-5 Ikars II – trainer 2-seat by Nikolajs Pūliņš
- Irbītis I-6 Gambija – trainer single-seat by Nikolajs Pūliņš
- Irbītis I-7 Zilais Putns – trainer single-seat by Nikolajs Pūliņš
- Irbītis I-8 Zilais Putns II – trainer 2-seat / Nikolajs Pūliņš & Kārlis Irbītis
- Irbītis I-9 Kaija – monoplane / Valsts Daugavpils Arodskola
- Irbītis I-10 Vanags – by Riga Aviation Club / Valsts Daugavpils Arodskola 1935

VEF Factory

- Irbītis VEF I-11 – sport (low-wing distance racer)
- Irbītis VEF I-12 – trainer 2-seat, converted to single-seater
- Irbītis VEF I-14 – sport (low-wing racer)
- Irbītis VEF I-15a – trainer military single-seat
- Irbītis VEF I-15b – bomber
- Irbītis VEF I-16 – fighter
- Irbītis VEF I-17-1 – trainer military 2-seat
- Irbītis VEF I-17-2 – trainer military 2-seat (engine Shvetsov M-11)
- Irbītis VEF I-18 – sport trainer by Latvia Aeroclub
- Irbītis VEF I-19 – fighter project

Other

- CL-84 – world's first successful tilt-wing aircraft / Canadair 1965
