= I11 =

I11 or I-11 may refer to:

- Interstate 11, a highway in the United States
- AISA I-11, a two-seat civil utility aircraft
- Japanese submarine I-11, a Type A1 submarine of the Japanese Imperial Navy
- Kronoberg Regiment, a Swedish Army infantry regiment designated as I 11 and I 11/Fo 16
- NMBS/SNCB I11 coach, a type of Belgian passenger rail vehicle
- VEF I-11, a Latvian light aircraft
