= Kohila =

Borough in Estonia

- Borough
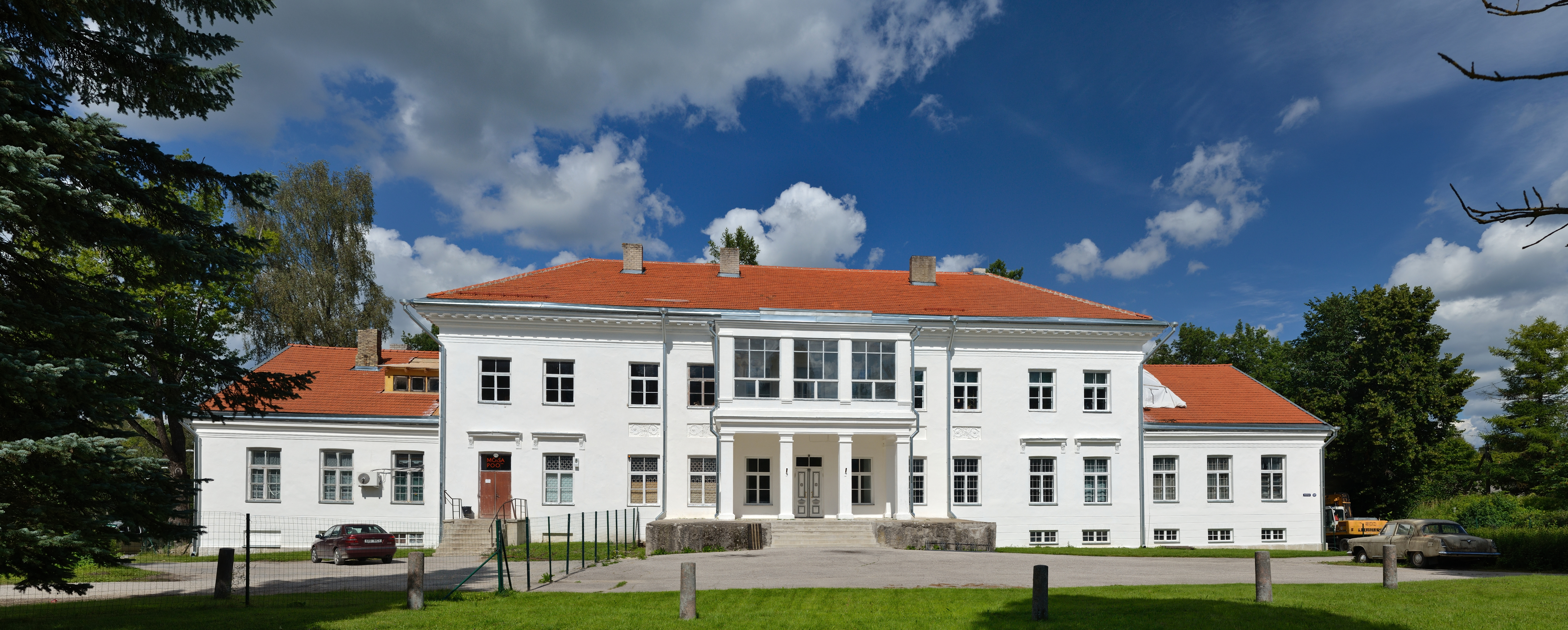
- Kohila manor

- Location in Estonia
- Coordinates: 59°10′4″N 24°45′1″E
- Country: Estonia
- County: Rapla County
- Municipality: Kohila Parish

Population (01.01.2006)
  - Total: 3,505

Drone video of Kohila bridges, watermill and town (June 2022)

Kohila (formerly also Kapa-Kohila, German: Koil, Kappakoil) is a borough (Estonian: alev) in Rapla County, northern Estonia. It is the administrative center of Kohila Parish. Kohila has a population of 3,505 (as of 1 January 2006).

Kohila has a railway station on the Tallinn - Viljandi railway line operated by Elron (rail transit).

The former name of the borough "Kapa-Kohila" is used as a synonym for "middle of nowhere" or to name any random place in Estonia.

== History ==
=== Kohila manor ===
Kohila manor (German: Koil) dates back to at least 1438. During its long history, the estate has belonged to various Baltic German families, including the Wrangel family, who owned it for more than 200 years. The present-day building originally dates from the early 19th century, but was heavily rebuilt after being burnt by rioters during the Revolution of 1905. Fourteen of the rioters were shot to death by Russian troops, and the lord of the manor, shaken by the events, shortly afterwards decided to sell the estate to a paper pulp factory.

Nowadays in Kohila there is a place named Tohisoo. Earlier Tohisoo manor was located there.

== Economy ==
Kohila is the location of Kohila plywood mill, operated by Kohila Vineer OÜ, a subsidiary of Latvijas Finieris.

== Gallery ==
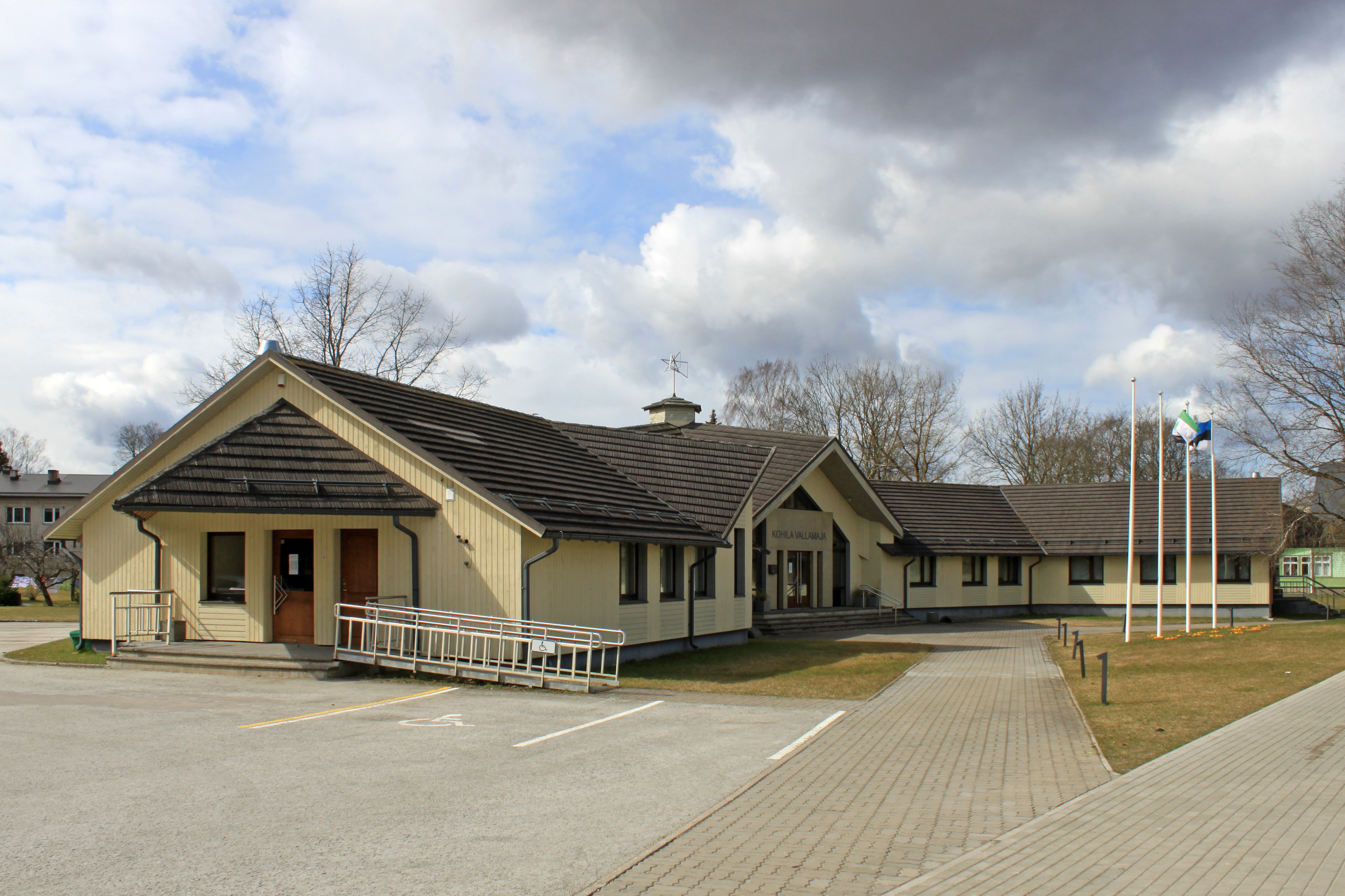
Kohila rural municipality government

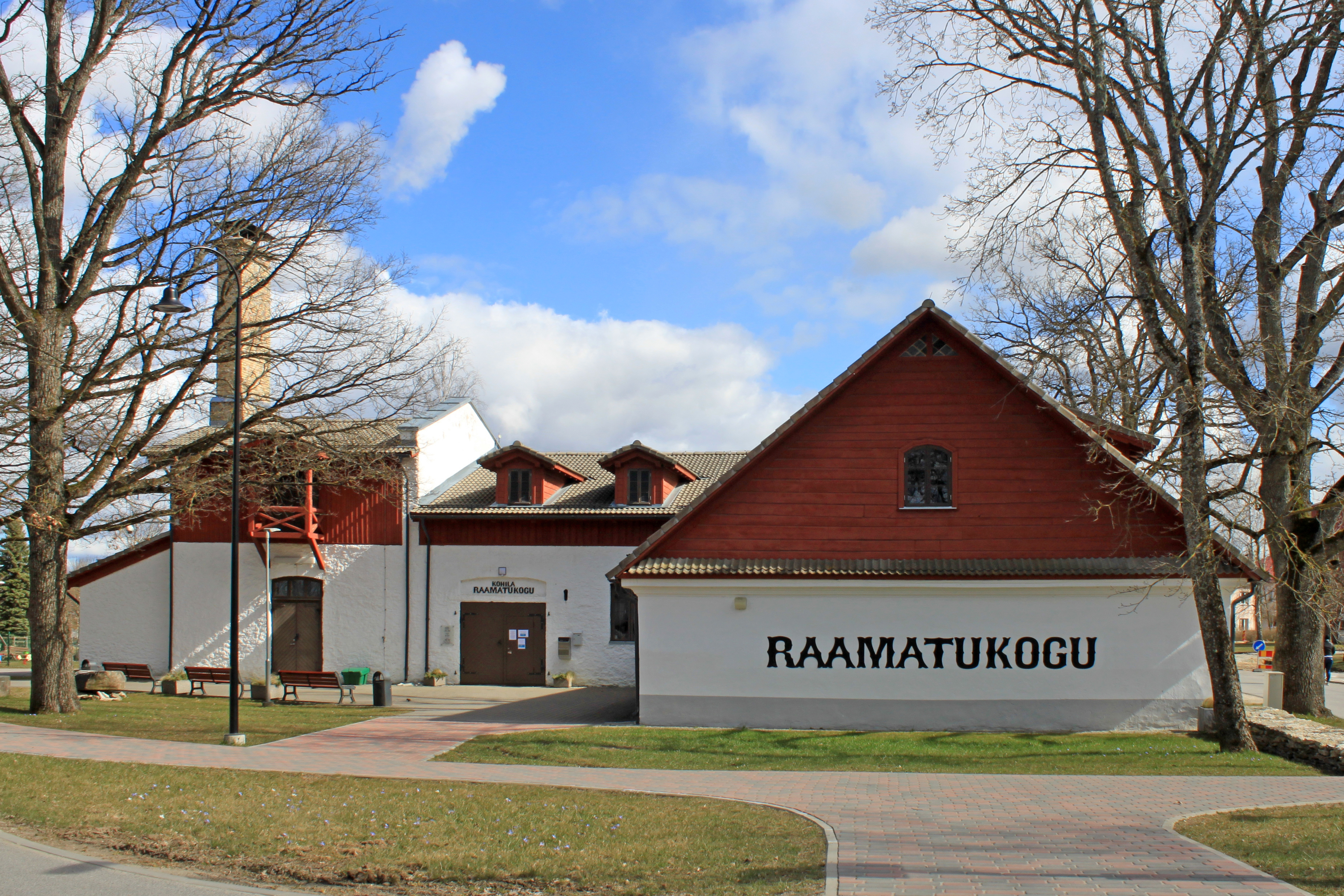
Kohila public library

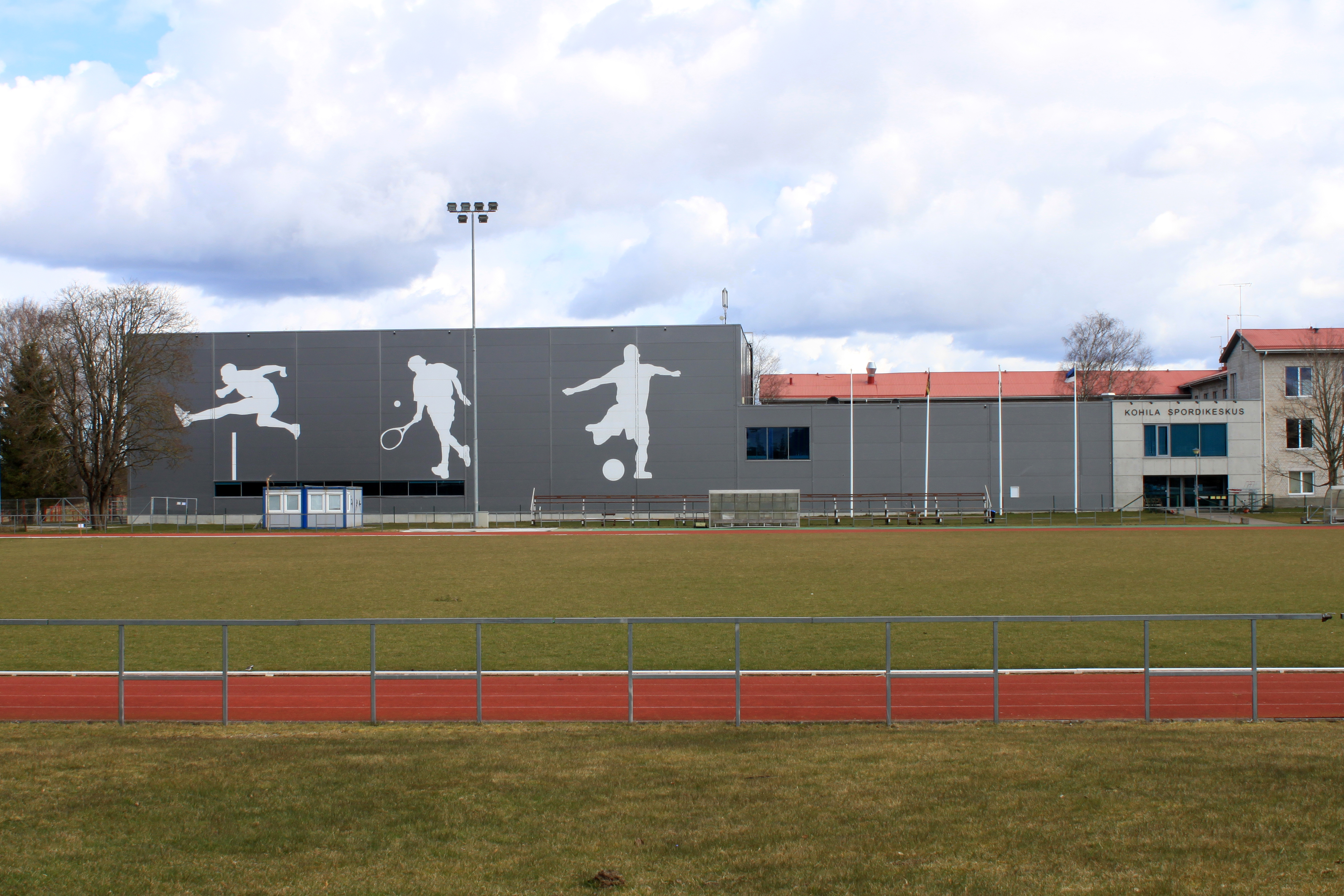
Kohila sports center

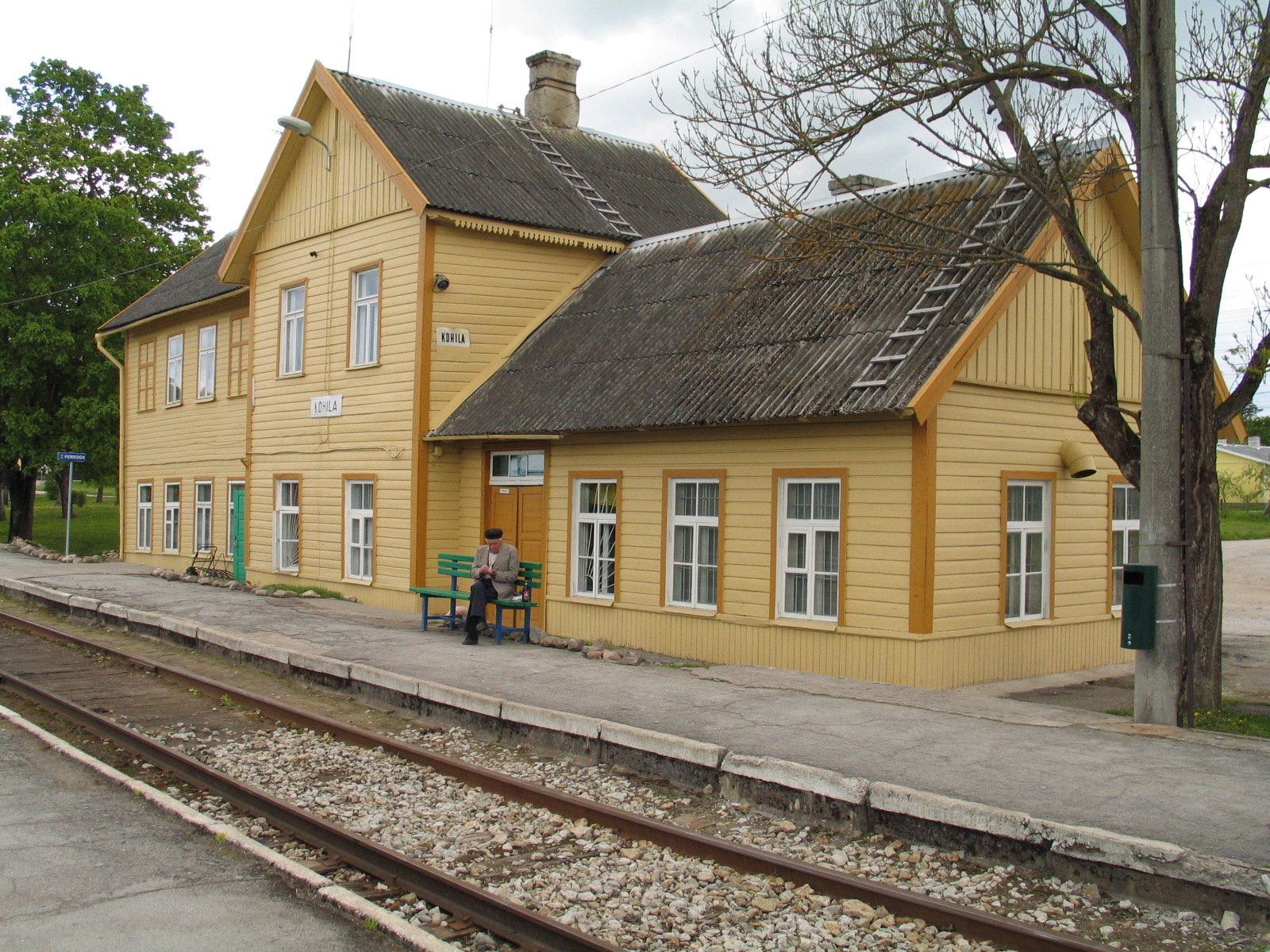
Kohila railway station

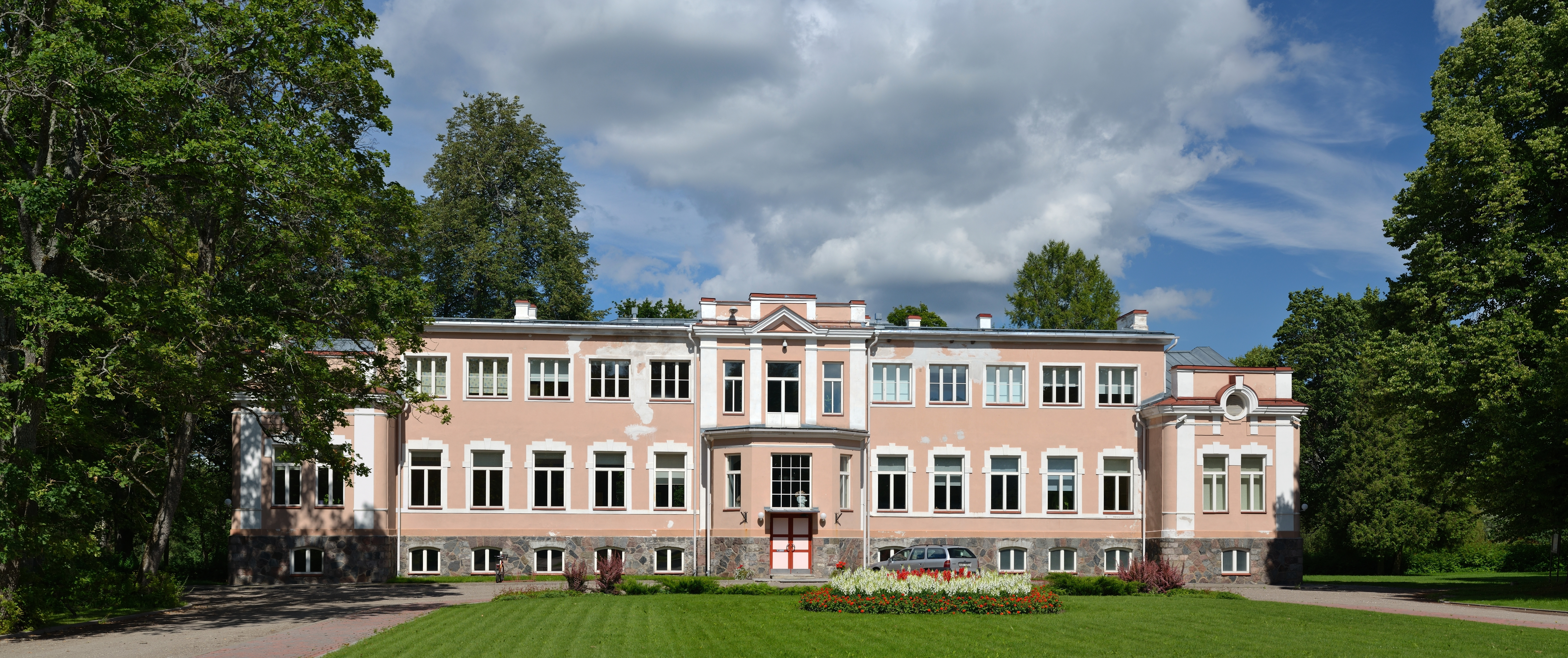
Tohisoo manor, now Kohila Training Center, an educational institution

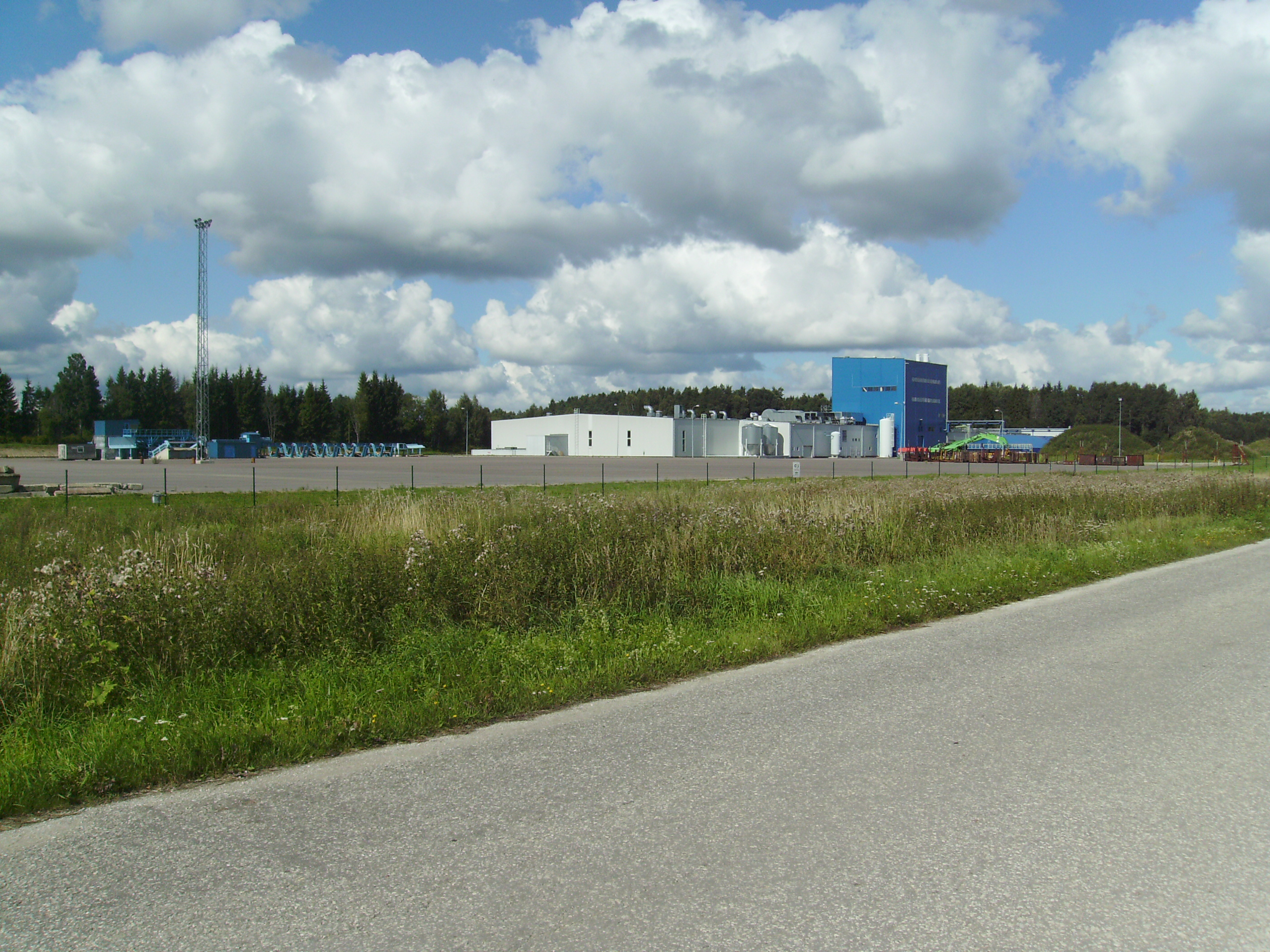
Kohila Vineer, a lumber and plywood manufacturer

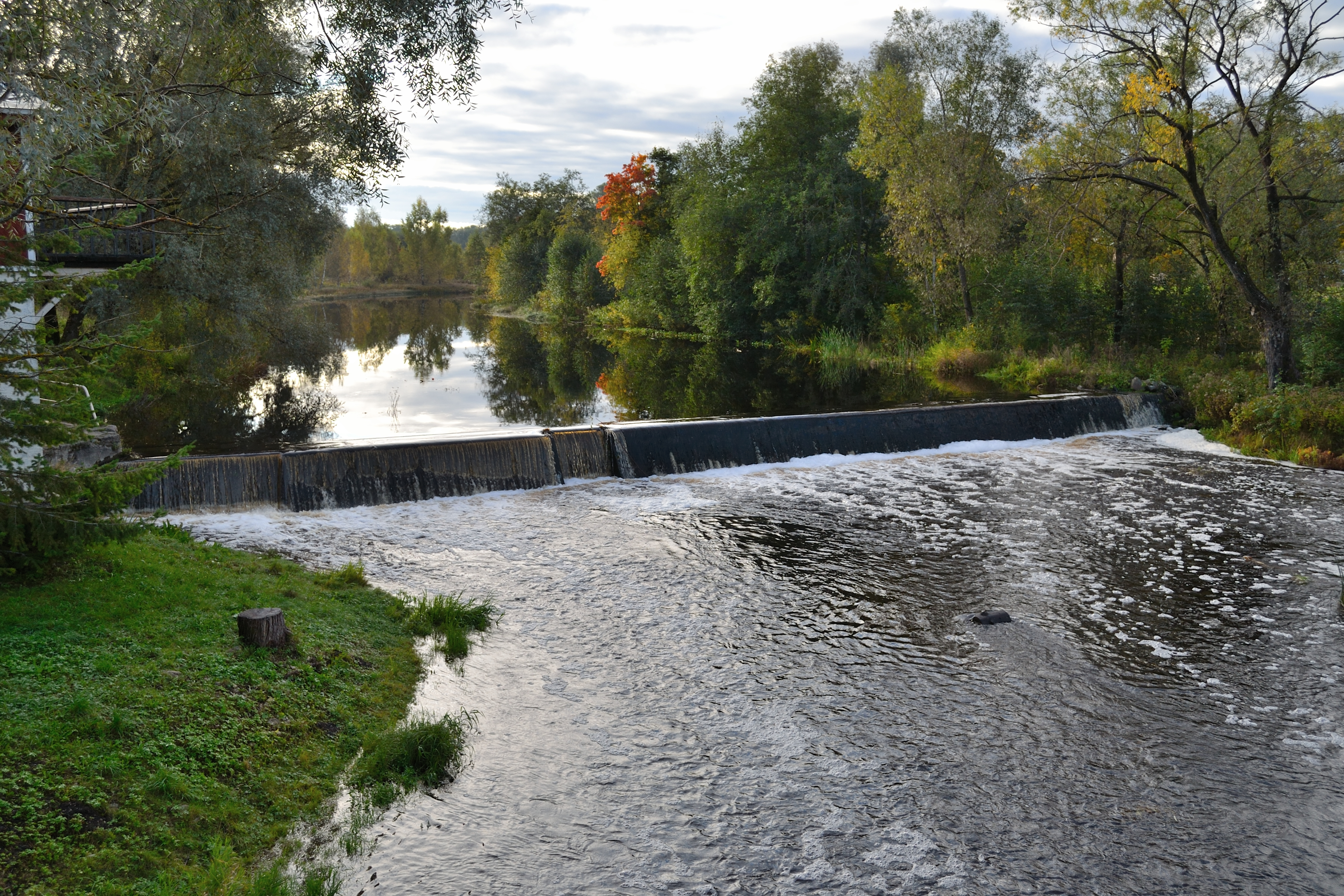
Mill dam on the Kohila River

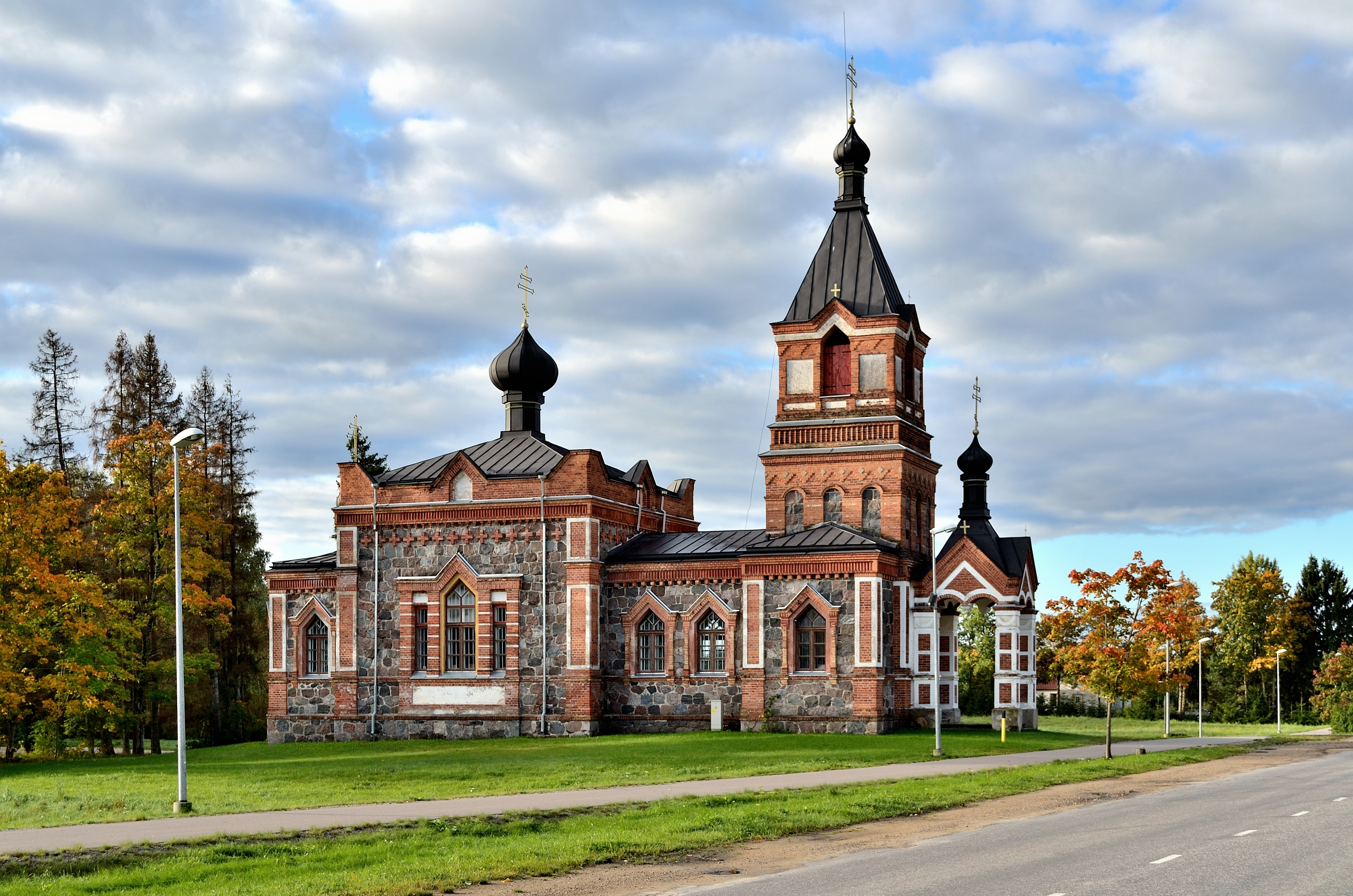
Kohila Orthodox church

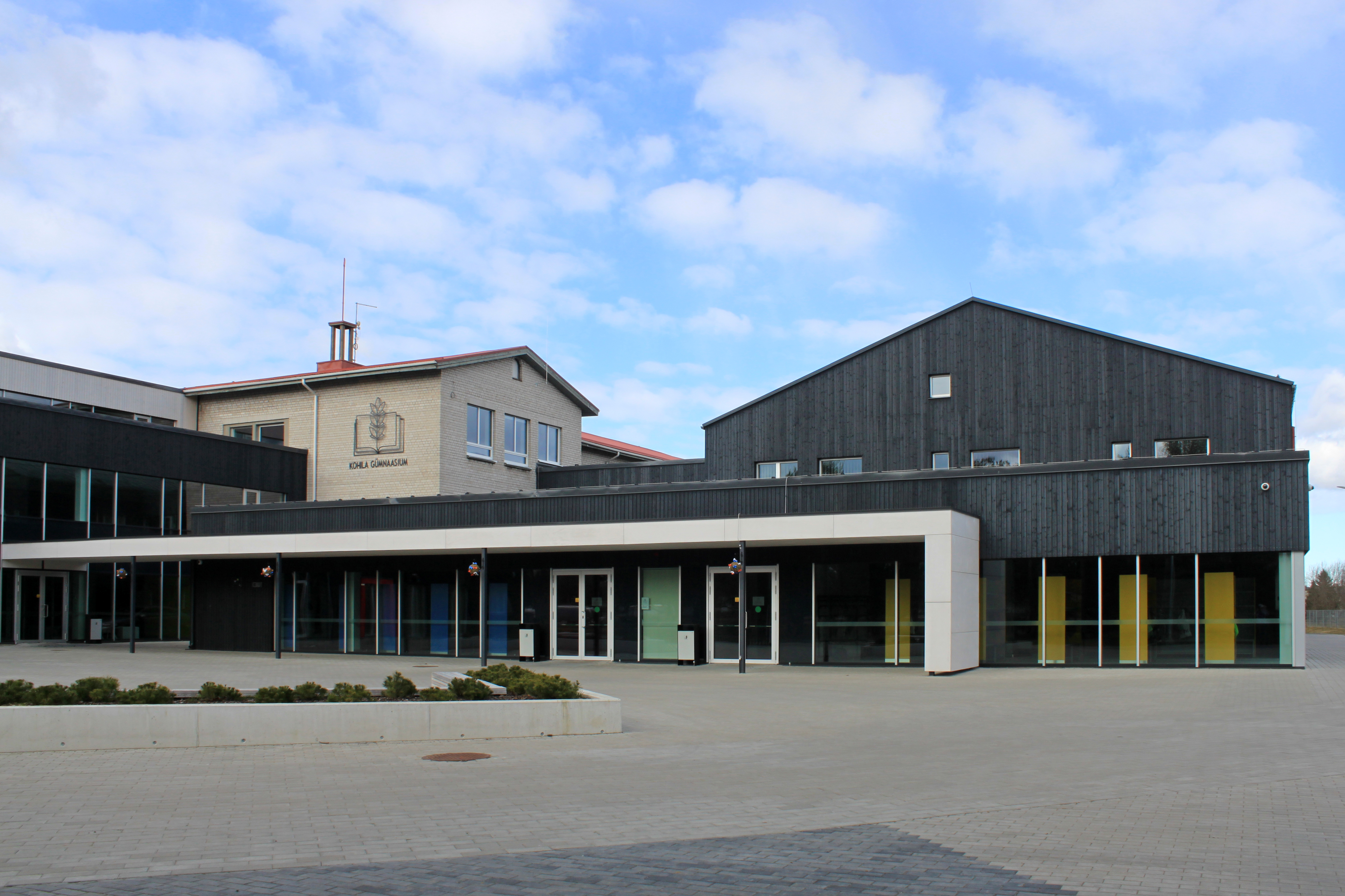
Kohila Gymnasium

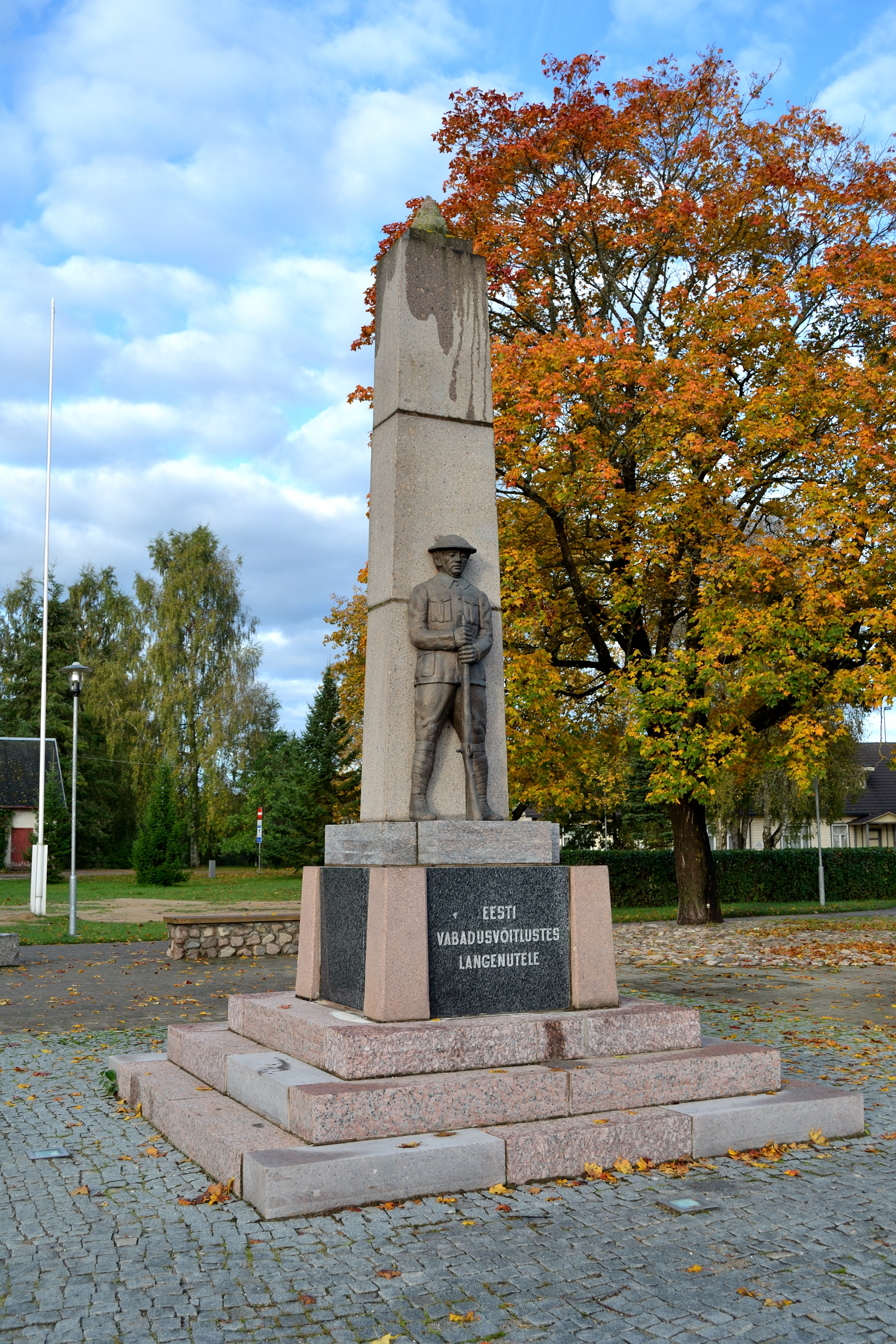
Estonian War of Independence memorial

== Notable residents ==
- Theodor Altermann (1885–1915), actor, theatre director and producer
- Indrek Hirv (born 1956), poet and artist
- Vaiko Eplik (born 1981), pop-composer, producer, singer and multi-instrumentalist.
- Birgit Sarrap (born 1988), singer, sang in the Eurovision Song Contest 2013

=== Sport ===
- Hain Helde (born 1972), sprint canoer who competed at the 1996 & 2000 Summer Olympics
- Kristjan Rahnu (born 1979), decathlete
- Enar Jääger (born 1984), footballer, played 395 games and 126 for Estonia
- Rait-Riivo Laane (born 1993), basketball player
