= VEF I-17 =

Latvian trainer aircraft

- VEF I-17 at the VEF factory, 1940

General information
- Type: Trainer aircraft
- National origin: Latvia
- Manufacturer: VEF
- Designer: Kārlis Irbītis
- Primary users: Latvian Air Force Luftwaffe
- Number built: 6

History
- Introduction date: 1940
- First flight: 1940

VEF I-17 was a Latvian trainer aircraft (intended also as a fighter) designed in 1939 by Latvian aircraft designer Kārlis Irbītis. The I-17 was test flown in early 1940 and almost immediately accepted by Latvian Air Force. It was produced by the VEF factory in Riga.

== Design and development ==
In 1939 Latvia ordered 39 Hawker Hurricane fighters from United Kingdom, thus there was a need for monoplane pilots in Latvia. For this purpose, Irbītis designed the VEF I-17 among other trainer aircraft. Due to the start of Second World War in September 1939, the British Hawker Hurricanes never arrived in Latvia which induced the Latvian Air Force to encourage Latvian aircraft development instead. Due to the pressures of the war, the I-17 prototype was accepted almost without testing and serial production started.

Six units of the I-17 were built and there was an order for another six, but that was halted following the Soviet occupation of Latvia in June 1940.

After the occupation, the I-17 was tested by Soviet Red Army and some had Soviet M-11 engines installed. After the occupation of Latvia by Nazi Germany in July 1941, the I-17 was also examined and tested by the Luftwaffe and, like the VEF I-16, was used by the aviation school in Toruń.

The further fate of the VEF I-17s produced is unknown.

Around 2009, it was reported that the Director of the Civil Aviation Agency of Latvia Māris Gorodcovs had begun work on building a replica of the I-17.

== Specifications (I-17) ==
Data from airwar.ru

General characteristics

- Crew: one
- Capacity: one passenger
- Length: 8.20 m (26 ft 11 in)
- Wingspan: 9.80 m (32 ft 2 in)
- Height: 2.90 m (9 ft 6 in)
- Wing area: 19.20 m^{2} (206.7 sq ft)
- Empty weight: 790 kg (1,742 lb)
- Gross weight: 1,140 kg (2,513 lb)
- Powerplant: 1 × Menasco Pirate C4 four cylinder, air-cooled, inline, four stroke aircraft engine, 93 kW (125 hp)
- Propellers: 2-bladed fixed pitch

Performance

- Maximum speed: 230 km/h (140 mph, 120 kn)
- Range: 592 km (368 mi, 320 nmi)
- Service ceiling: 5,900 m (19,400 ft)
- Wing loading: 59.4 kg/m^{2} (12.2 lb/sq ft)
