= VEF I-14 =

Latvian trainer aircraft prototype

I-14

General information
- Type: trainer
- National origin: Latvia
- Manufacturer: VEF
- Status: Prototype destroyed
- Number built: one

History
- Introduction date: 1937
- First flight: 19 November 1937

The VEF I-14 was a Latvian Air Force trainer aircraft prototype, built by VEF.

== Design and development ==
Kārlis Irbītis began work on the I-14 in 1936 in response to an order placed by the Latvian Air Force for a new trainer aircraft. Taking inspiration from the British Miles aircraft, the I-14 was a low-wing monoplane with fixed, conventional landing gear. The single pilot sat in an enclosed cockpit. It was powered by a 200 hp Menasco B6S Buccaneer.

== Operational history ==
The I-14 made its maiden flight on 19 November 1937. On 23 April 1938, the aircraft was destroyed in a crash, its pilot, Bandenieks, was unhurt. Development of the I-14 was abandoned in favor of the more advanced VEF I-15.

== Specifications (I-14) ==
Data from

General characteristics

- Crew: 1
- Length: 7.3 m (23 ft 11 in)
- Wingspan: 8 m (26 ft 3 in)
- Height: 2 m (6 ft 7 in)
- Empty weight: 410 kg (904 lb)
- Max takeoff weight: 665 kg (1,466 lb)
- Powerplant: 1 × Menasco B6S Buccaneer air-cooled inline engine, 150 kW (200 hp)
