= VEF JDA-10M =

Latvian multi-purpose aircraft

- VEF JDA-10M at the Spilve airport, Riga.

General information
- Type: Multi-purpose, light bomber
- Manufacturer: VEF
- Designer: Jānis Akermanis
- Primary user: Latvia
- Number built: 1

History
- First flight: 1939

The VEF JDA-10M was a Latvian twin-engine, multipurpose aircraft built in 1939 by VEF. It remains the only twin-engine aircraft ever built in Latvia. The developer of JDA-10M was Latvian-American engineer Jānis Akermanis (John D. Akerman), a professor at the University of Minnesota, the aircraft was assembled at the State Electrotechnical Factory (Valsts elektrotehniskā fabrika - VEF).

== Design and development ==
The VEF JDA-10M was of primarily wooden construction, with fixed conventional landing gear. Only one prototype was built.

Construction started in 1937, but the first flight of the JDA-10M was on September 4, 1939. Initially it was planned to be powered by two 153 kW (205 hp) inverted 6 cylinder inline de Havilland Gipsy Six II, yet latter two 261 kW (350 hp) 7 cylinder radials Armstrong Siddeley Cheetah IX were chosen.

After the beginning of the Second World War it was planned to transform the airplane into a light bomber for military purposes. This work was halted by the Soviet occupation of Latvia in June 1940. Soviet authorities took over the aircraft, yet it was decided not to continue its development and the aircraft was scrapped before German invasion of 1941.

== Specifications (JDA-10M) ==
Data from

General characteristics

- Crew: 4 (pilot, observer, radio operator, commander/gunner
- Capacity: 6
- Length: 9 m (29 ft 6 in)
- Wingspan: 12.4 m (40 ft 8 in)
- Height: 3.3 m (10 ft 10 in)
- Wing area: 24 m^{2} (260 sq ft)
- Empty weight: 1,680 kg (3,704 lb)
- Gross weight: 2,800 kg (6,173 lb)
- Powerplant: 2 × Armstrong Siddeley Cheetah IX 7-cylinder air-cooled radial piston engines, 260 kW (350 hp) each

Performance

- Maximum speed: 330 km/h (210 mph, 180 kn) at 2,000 m (6,600 ft)
- Cruise speed: 280 km/h (170 mph, 150 kn)
- Range: 560 km (350 mi, 300 nmi)
- Service ceiling: 6,800 m (22,300 ft)
- Time to altitude: 5.5 min to 3,000 m (9,800 ft)

== See also ==
Aircraft of comparable role, configuration, and era

- Airspeed Oxford
- Avro Anson
