= VEF I-11 =

Latvian light aircraft

General information
- Type: Light aircraft
- National origin: Latvia
- Manufacturer: VEF
- Designer: Kārlis Irbītis
- Status: Production completed
- Number built: 1

History
- Introduction date: 1936
- First flight: June 23, 1936
- Variant: VEF I-12

The VEF I-11 (also called the Irbītis I-11) was a Latvian light aircraft built by VEF.

== Design and development ==
The I-11 was designed by Kārlis Irbītis in 1936. It was a low-wing monoplane with a two-seat tandem cockpit and fixed conventional landing gear. On the basis of the I-11, Irbītis designed the training fighter I-12.

== Operational history ==
On June 23, 1936, the I-11 made its maiden flight.

On April 26, 1937, it flew a 1,000 km (621 mi) flight around Latvia in 5 1/2 hours.

== See also ==
Related development

- VEF I-12
