= VEF I-15 =

Latvian trainer aircraft prototype

General information
- Type: Advanced trainer
- National origin: Latvia
- Manufacturer: VEF
- Designer: Kārlis Irbītis
- Primary user: Latvian Air Force
- Number built: 2

History
- First flight: 1939

The VEF I-15 was a Latvian advanced trainer aircraft of the 1930s. Two prototypes of the I-15, a small, single-engined monoplane, were built by the VEF to the designs of Kārlis Irbītis and were used by the Latvian Air Force

== Development and design ==
In 1938, the Latvian aircraft designer Kārlis Irbītis, working at the Valsts Elektrotehniskā Fabrika (VEF) at Riga commenced design of a single-seat advanced trainer as a follow on to his earlier, similar VEF I-14 aircraft. The I-15 was a low-winged monoplane of all-wooden construction, powered by a single de Havilland Gipsy Six air-cooled engine, and fitted with a fixed tailwheel undercarriage.

In April 1939, the first prototype, the I-15a, powered by a 200 hp (149 kW) Gypsy Six I driving a two-bladed fixed-pitch wooden propeller, made its maiden flight, while a second prototype, the I-15b, powered by a 220 hp (167 kW) Gypsy Six II engine driving a variable-pitch propeller, and armed with a single synchronised machine gun, followed. This demonstrating improved performance.

The two I-15 prototypes were transferred to the Latvian Air Force for use as advanced trainers, while a further two aircraft, to be designated I-15bis and powered by Hispano-Suiza 6 Mb engines were ordered by the Air Force, but on 17 June 1940, the Soviet Union occupied Latvia, ordering all aviation related work to be stopped.

== Specifications (I-15b) ==
Data from Air International, January 1979

General characteristics

- Crew: 1
- Length: 7.10 m (23 ft 4 in)
- Wingspan: 8.00 m (26 ft 3 in)
- Height: 2.10 m (6 ft 11 in)
- Wing area: 10.77 m^{2} (115.9 sq ft)
- Empty weight: 750 kg (1,653 lb)
- Gross weight: 960 kg (2,116 lb)
- Powerplant: 1 × de Havilland Gipsy Six Series II six-cylinder inverted air-cooled inline engine, 160 kW (220 hp)

Performance

- Maximum speed: 331 km/h (206 mph, 179 kn)
- Cruise speed: 300 km/h (190 mph, 160 kn) (max continuous cruise)
- Range: 610 km (380 mi, 330 nmi)
- Service ceiling: 7,000 m (23,000 ft)

Armament

- Guns: 1× machine gun
