= VEF I-12 =

Latvian trainer aircraft

I-12
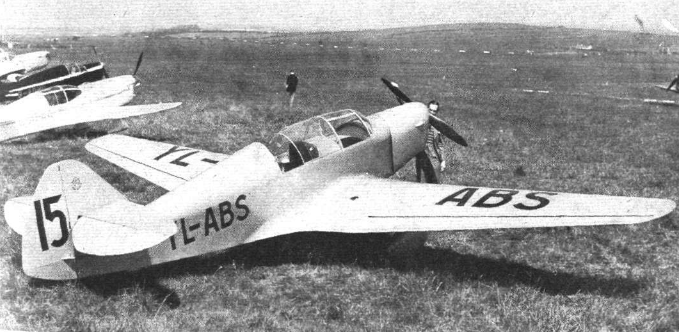

General information
- Type: Single engine, two seat cabin sports and trainer aircraft
- National origin: Latvia
- Manufacturer: Valsts elektrotehniskā fabrika (VEF)
- Designer: Kārlis Irbītis
- Number built: 12

History
- First flight: 26 June 1937
- Developed from: VEF I-11.

The VEF I-12 was a tandem, two-seat Latvian trainer aircraft designed by Kārlis Irbītis and produced by VEF in Riga.

== Design and development ==
The single engine, tandem, two seat I-12 was a development of the similarly laid out I-11, strengthened for aerobatics. It was an all wood low-wing monoplane, entirely plywood covered apart from the tail control surfaces and with a fixed, conventional undercarriage. Its cantilever wing was built around a main and an auxiliary box spar, both made from spruce and plywood. The short wing centre section was integral with the fuselage, with the main undercarriage legs on it. These and the wheels, fitted with brakes, were faired. Outboard, the wing panels tapered to rounded tips, carrying both the balanced and slotted differential ailerons and hand-operated camber-changing split flaps.

The fuselage was a rectangular box formed from spruce longerons, with a ply roof behind the cabin, where a long, multipart canopy enclosed the pilot and passenger's seats. The pilot sat at the rear; both had removable sections for access. In front of them the 90 hp (67 kW) Blackburn Cirrus four cylinder in-line, inverted engine was mounted on steel bearers, driving a wooden propeller. At the rear of the fuselage the empennage was conventional, with the tailplane mounted on the fin above the fuselage line and braced from below with a steel strut on each side. The elevators were hinged forward of the rudder, which carried a trim tab, but were shaped to allow its movement as it extended to the keel.

== Operational history ==
The I-12 first flew on 26 June 1937, the first of twelve units built. The first prototype, on a European tour begun in July 1937, made several demonstrations in Paris. In the UK it raced at Ramsgate, coming fifth in the handicapped Thanet Air Race at Ramsgate, as well as winning first prize for the best turned out aircraft. Late in August it came in second in the Cinque Ports Wakefield Cup races at Lympne. Its tour ended the following July, and it was flown back to Riga by P. Avery in a record nine hours, non-stop from London. Avery flew another I-12 in 1939, coming fifth in the London to Isle of Man race and competing in the Isle of Man competition in May.

The I-12 was enthusiastically reviewed by the British aeronautical press and Rollasons were designated as distributors after the I-12 had been adjusted to meet UK certification requirements. It was also offered for sale in the UK by D.R.P. Engines at £750 but no examples reached the UK civil register.

At least four were purchased as trainers by the Aizsargi in early 1938, most surviving to the Soviet occupation of 1940.

== Replicas ==
An airworthy replica of the I-12 was built in 2009 by retired sports teacher Juris Grīnbergs after a seven-year long project. The maiden flight of the replica took place near Iecava in 2010. It was put on display at Riga International Airport in August 2023.

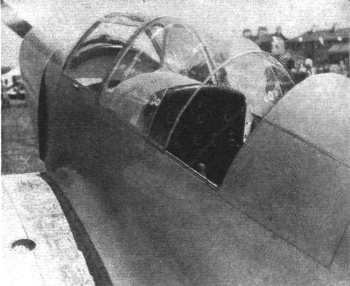
VEF I-12 cockpit, 1939

== Operators ==
Latvia

- Aizsargi
- Latvian Air Force

== Specifications (I-12) ==
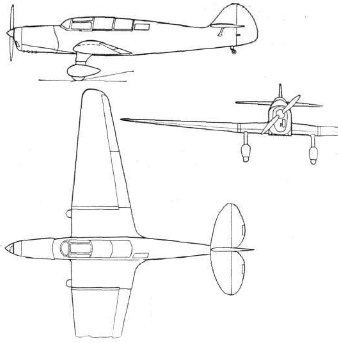

Data from Jane's All the World's Aircraft 1938.

General characteristics

- Crew: 1
- Capacity: 1 passenger
- Length: 7.1 m (23 ft 4 in)
- Wingspan: 9.3 m (30 ft 6 in)
- Height: 1.9 m (6 ft 3 in)
- Wing area: 11.3 m^{2} (122 sq ft)
- Empty weight: 458 kg (1,010 lb)
- Gross weight: 680 kg (1,499 lb)
- Fuel capacity: 17.5 imp gal (79.6 L; 21.0 US gal)
- Powerplant: 1 × Blackburn Cirrus Minor 4-cylinder inverted inline, air cooled, 67 kW (90 hp)
- Propellers: 2-bladed

Performance

- Maximum speed: 230 km/h (140 mph, 120 kn)
- Cruise speed: 198 km/h (123 mph, 107 kn)
- Range: 720 km (450 mi, 390 nmi)
- Landing speed: 47 mph (76 km/h)

== See also ==
Related development

- VEF I-11
