= Latvijas Finieris =

Company based in Riga, Latvia

- Company type: Joint stock company
- Industry: Plywood and timber
- Founded: 1992
- Headquarters: Riga, Latvia
- Key people: Uldis Biķis (Chairman), Jānis Ciems (President and CEO)
- Products: Plywood and wood products
- Revenue: 404,821,425 euro (2023)
- Net income: 44,927,968 euro (2023)
- Total assets: 350,534,555 euro (2023)
- Number of employees: 1,455 (2023)
- Website: www.finieris.com

JSC Latvijas Finieris is a Latvian manufacturer of veneer, plywood and related products. Other significant activities of the group include the sale of board materials, forestry and logging, as well as the production of synthetic resins and phenol-formaldehyde resin films. Plywood products are exported to more than 50 countries under the Riga Wood brand.

== Production sites ==
Production sites
Country	Product	Production Units
Estonia	Plywood	Kohila plywood mill
Finland	Plywood	Sastamala veneer mill
Latvia	Plywood	Lignums plywood mill; Furniers plywood mill; Hapaks plywood further processing mill; Verems plywood mill; Kuldīgas fabrika veneer mill
Latvia	Other	Troja further processing and wood products; Iekārtu rūpnīca (machinery manufacturing); Chemical products plant
Lithuania	Plywood	Likmere veneer mill
Estonia	Plywood	Sastamala

== History ==
The origins of "Latvijas Finieris" can be traced back to the Latvijas Bērzs factory, founded in 1873, where plywood production began in Latvia for the first time with the installation of a hydraulic press in 1909.

With the rapid development of industry, the companies Furniers and Lignums, established in later years, became the most modern manufacturers of birch veneer and plywood products of their time and were recognized in many countries around the world.

During the Soviet occupation, all three factories were merged in 1975 to form the state-owned company Latvijas finieru ražošanas apvienība (Latvian Plywood Production Association). As the collapse of the USSR approached, production volumes declined rapidly, and the plywood industry in Latvia only experienced new development after 1992, when many factory workers joined forces to establish the closed joint-stock company Latvijas Finieris.

On November 9, 2021, the company introduced a new export brand for its products, Riga Wood. On June 14, 2024, Latvijas Finieris opened a new veneer production facility, Kuldīgas fabrika, in Kuldīga. The investment in the production building, equipment, technology and site improvement was approximately €16 million. The facility uses a hybrid veneer peeling machine that can peel veneer logs down to a 25 mm core, allowing smaller-diameter birch roundwood to be used for veneer production. The plant was expected to eventually employ up to 30 specialists.

== Employees and structure ==
The Group employs more than 2,400 people in over 250 different professions. The company's structure includes several factories, processing and sales companies, logistics and timber businesses, forming a complete chain from forest to finished product.

== University patron ==
Latvijas Finieris is a bronze patron of the University of Latvia Foundation. In 2001, it donated to the installation of a memorial stone to the patron of the University of Latvia Kristaps Morbergs in Bukaiši, in his native house "Lielstrikaiši".
