= Mix & Genest =

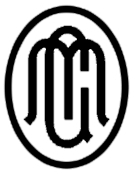
- Industry: Telecommunication
- Founded: 1879
- Fate: Absorbed; name dropped in 1958
- Successor: Standard Elektrizitätsgesellschaft
- Headquarters: Berlin, Germany
- Key people: Wilhelm Mix, Werner Genest

Mix & Genest was founded on 1 October 1879 by the businessman Wilhelm Mix and the engineer Werner Genest in Berlin-Schöneberg. The company was initially an 1879 branch of the ITT Corporation. It was very successful and became one of the pioneers in low voltage devices. Among the products were devices for telephony and telegraphy. By 1904 the company had already 2300 employees and subsidiaries in London and Amsterdam. In 1920 AEG bought the majority of the stock shares.

Mix & Genest was acquired by the ITT Corporation in 1930. The name Mix & Genest was dropped in 1958.
