= VEF Spidola =

Transistor radio produced in Latvian SSR

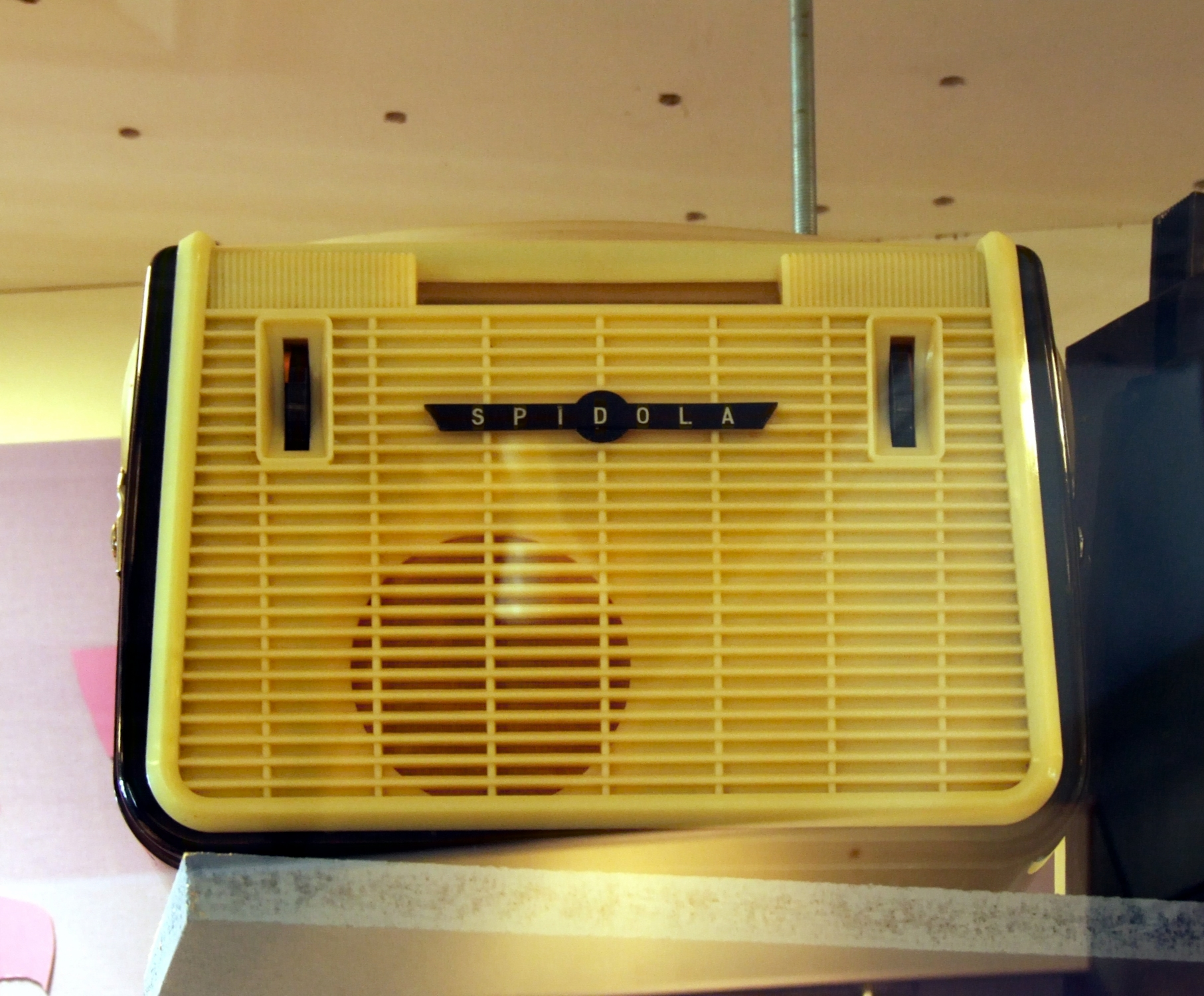
Spīdola (1960)

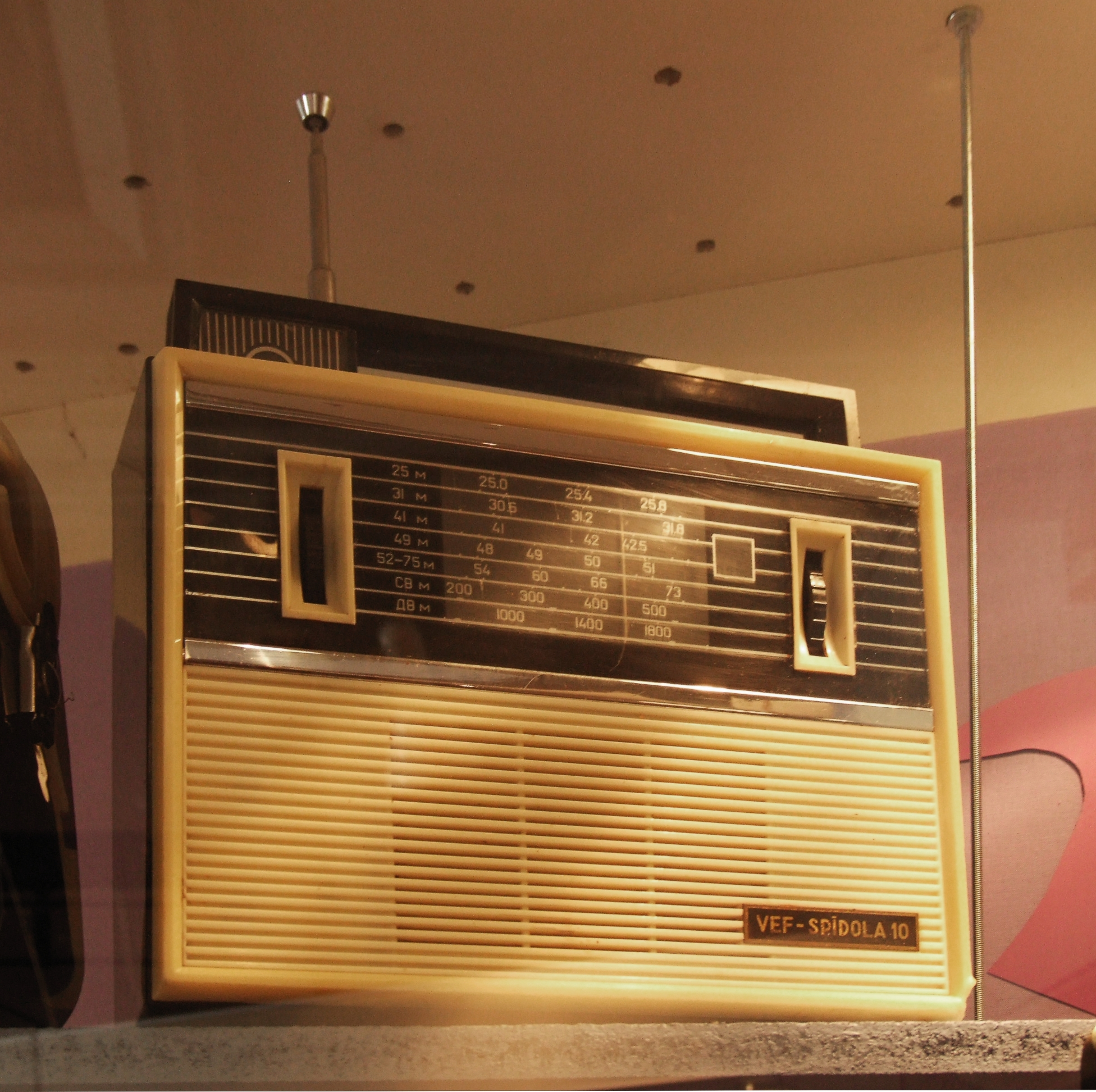
Restyled VEF-Spīdola 10 (1963)

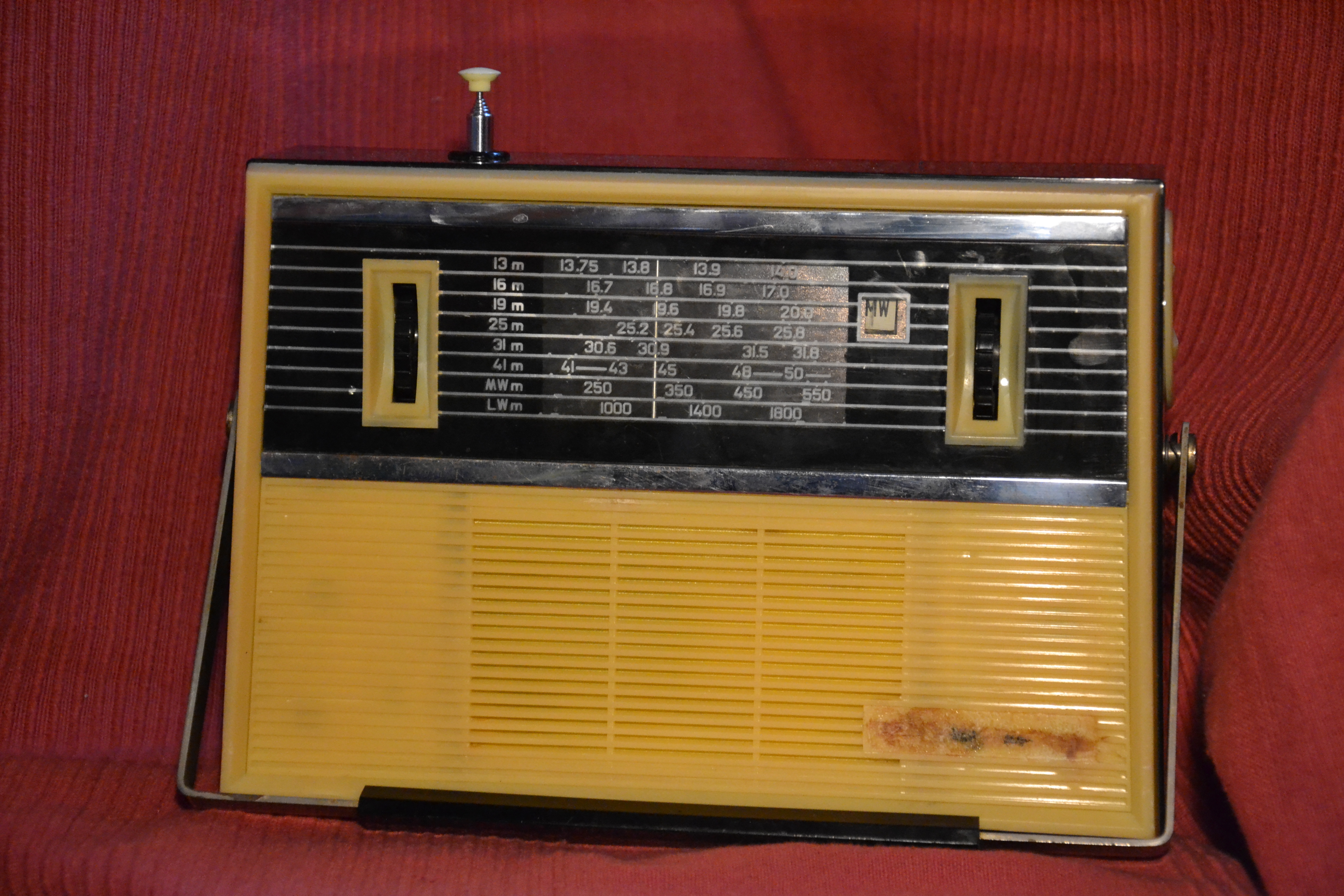
VEF-Transistor 10 (1965), export issue of VEF-Spīdola 10, with additional short wave band. Also known in UK as Convair-10

VEF Spidola (Latvian: VEF Spīdola, Russian: ВЭФ Спидола) was the first mass-produced transistor radio with short wave band in the Soviet Union (tube short wave receivers were produced for many years before). It was manufactured by the VEF factory in Riga, Latvia, since 1962. A small series under the name "Spidola" (Спидола ПМП-60) had been manufactured since 1960. It was named after the fictional witch Spīdola from the Latvian epic poem.

== History ==
VEF engineers Uldis Briedis and Jānis Cerps initially worked on a portable transistor radio on their own initiative, outside of working hours. They assembled their prototype using the enclosure from an existing tube-based receiver named "Tурист (Tourist)". Their prototype covered the broadcast, medium-wave, and shortwave (16 to 50 meter) bands. By the late 1950s, VEF was facing a surplus of unsold tube-based radios, and factory management saw the engineer's project as a potential lifeline for the factory. A small batch of the first radio under the "Spidola" brand—the PMP-60 (russian abbreviation for "compact semiconductor receiver", also known as PMK-60)—was released in 1960. The design was created by Ādolfs Irbītis, while Jānis Cerps came up with the name. Due to bureaucratic delays and technical challenges, mass production of the first model did not begin until 1962, but continued until 1965.

In many cases, the Spidola was used to listen to Western stations, such as the Voice of America, Radio Free Europe/Radio Liberty, BBC, and Deutsche Welle. The criminal prosecution of at least one Soviet dissident involved confiscation of the Spidola as an "instrument of crime," but without specifying the "crime" committed with the confiscated Spidola.

The word "spidola" was a genericised trademark for "transistor radio" for a long time in Russian (other synonyms included "transistor"). In Chukchi language, the word "spidola" is generic for any portable transistor radio.

== Specifications ==
First, "Spidola" was a ten-transistor, seven-band superheterodyne. Some versions were eight-band.

- Intermediate frequency: 465 kHz.
- Tuning range Longwave, Medium Wave and more than five short waves ranges (13, 16, 19, 25, 31, 41, 49 and 52–75 meters).
- Sensitivity: 1.5 - 2 mV/m (broadcast), 100 μV (short wave).
- Selectivity (±10 kHz): 32 dB or better
- Power supply: six D cells, or two 3R12 batteries, of 9 V total.
- Output power: 150 mW.
- Average current consumption: 25 mA.
- Dimensions: 275×197×90 mm.
- Weight without batteries: 2.2 kg.
- Price (after 1961 denomination): abt. 73 rubles.

== See also ==
- VEF
