= 2020 Latvian Football Cup =

Football tournament held in Latvia

Tournament details
- Country: Latvia
- Teams: 47

Final positions
- Champions: Liepāja
- Runners-up: Ventspils

Tournament statistics
- Matches played: 46
- Goals scored: 202 (4.39 per match)

The 2020 Latvian Football Cup was the 26th edition of the football tournament. The competition began on 23 July 2020 and ended on 8 November 2020. RFS were the defending champions, having won the previous year's final over Jelgava 3–2 after extra time. The cup winners qualified for the 2021–22 UEFA Europa League 1st qualifying round.

== Format ==
47 teams took part in the competition. Each round was played over single leg and matches took place for 90 minutes, with two halves of 45 minutes. If tied after regular time, 30 minutes of extra time were played, consisting of two periods of 15 minutes. If the score was still leveled after this, the match was decided by a penalty shoot-out in order to decide the winner. No seeding was applied at any round.

== Participating teams ==
Virslīga (1st tier)	1. līga; (2nd tier)	2. līga; (3rd tier)	3. līga; (4th tier)
BFC Daugavpils FK Ventspils FK Jelgava Riga FC FK Liepāja FK Spartaks Jūrmala RFS Valmiera FC FK Tukums 2000/TSS FK Metta	SK Super Nova Grobiņas SC JDFS Alberts Rēzeknes FA/BJSS FK Dinamo Rīga FC Lokomotiv Daugavpils Saldus SS/Leevon FK Auda FK Smiltene/BJSS	FK Priekuļi FK Limbaži FK Aliance Albatroz SC/FS Jelgava Mārupes SC SK Krimulda FK Staiceles Bebri FK Salaspils FK Karosta	FK Lielupe FK Kalupe Lubāna/Degumnieki/Madonas BJSS FK Alberts FK Valka SK Upesciems FK Cēsis Jēkabpils SC FK Pļaviņas DM FC Gauja FK Dobele Allegro Liepājas FS FK Jūrnieks Jūrmalas SS Tente/SFS DSVK Traktors Talsi/FK Laidze RTU FK Kauguri/Beitar

== First round ==
The draw for the first round was held on 7 July, 2020. Teams from 2. līga and 3. līga only entered the competition at this point. Two teams: FK Valka and FK Alberts got byes to the second round. The matches were played between 23 July and 9 August 2020.

Team 1	Score	Team 2
Dobele Allegro	2–2 (4–3 p)	RTU
Pļaviņas DM	4–2	Cēsis
Liepājas FS	1–4	Jēkabpils
Madona/BJSS	1–13	Kalupe
Talsi/Laidze	2–1 (a.e.t.)	DSVK Traktors
Upesciems	1–3	Limbaži
Tente	4–1	Krimulda
Karosta	4–0	Jūrmalas SS
Lielupe	1–2	Priekuļi
Kauguri	6–1	Aliance
Mārupe	0–0 (1–4 p)	Albatroz
Salaspils	4–1	Jurnieks
Gauja	2–3	Staiceles Bebri

23 July 2020	Dobele Allegro (4)	2–2 (4–3 p)	Rīgas Tehniskā Universitāte (4)	FK Jelgava Sporta bāzes mākslīgais laukums, Jelgava
21:00	Ivanovs 18'; Roziņš 44'	Report	Bogdanovs 20'; Suranovs 24'	Attendance: 89; Referee: Ruslans Botošs
	Penalties
	Linds (penalty scored); Jansons (penalty missed); Ūtēns (penalty scored); Ivanovs (penalty scored); Pinka (penalty scored)		Morozs (penalty scored); Bogdanovs (penalty missed); Čebotarjovs (penalty scored); Krastiņš (penalty missed); Suranovs (penalty scored)

25 July 2020	FK Pļaviņas DM (4)	4–2	FK Cēsis (4)	Gostiņu stadions, Pļaviņas Municipality
12:00	Prohorovs 20', 27', 87' (pen.); Kokarevičs 46'	Report	Vēlme 7'; Eglītis 44'	Attendance: 50; Referee: Kristaps Ratnieks

29 July 2020	Liepājas FS (4)	1–4	Jēkabpils SC (4)	Stadions Velnciems, Liepāja
15:00	Ķēdža 15'	Report	Liņģis 10'; Potlovs 51'; Ragainis 72'; Trofimovs 90+2' (pen.)	Attendance: 35; Referee: Gints Švažs

2 August 2020	Lubāna/Degumnieki/Madonas BJSS (4)	1–13	FK Kalupe (4)	Degumnieku pamatskolas stadions, Madona Municipality
16:00	Kuncis 87'	Report	Kozlov 10' (pen.), 28' (pen.); Maļinovskis 22'; Narovskis 30'; Rasčevskis 47'; Iļjahovs 50', 53', 67', 83'; Kirijenko 70', 75', 80', 89'	Attendance: 40; Referee: Aleksejs Groznovs

2 August 2020	Talsi/FK Laidze (4)	2–1 (a.e.t.)	DSVK Traktors (4)	Talsu pilsētas stadions, Talsi
17:00	Šnēbergs 28'; Červoņikovs 100'	Report	Čibulis 8'	Attendance: 93; Referee: Konstantīns Sprūdžs

3 August 2020	SK Upesciems (4)	1–3	FK Limbaži (3)	Upesciema stadions, Upesciems
18:30	Odiņš 15'	Report	Kārkliņš 9'; Bieziņš 17'; Ulmis 80'	Attendance: 31; Referee: Andrejs Gluhovs

4 August 2020	Tente/SFS (4)	4–1	SK Krimulda (3)	Academ Stadium, Rīga
18:00	Rosoha 37' (pen.), 82'; Kļimovs 53'; Medeckis 87'	Report	Ziļs 52'	Attendance: 31; Referee: Artis Ķēniņš

6 August 2020	FK Karosta (3)	4–0	Jūrmalas SS (4)	Daugava Stadium, Liepāja
19:00	Reguzovs 3'; Kovaļskis 26'; Attiķis 32'; Moseičenko 38'	Report		Attendance: 120; Referee: Gints Švažs

== Second round ==
13 winners of the first round were joined by FK Valka and FK Alberts (both teams had byes to the second round) as well as nine teams from the 1. līga. The matches were played between 20 and 23 August 2020.

Team 1	Score	Team 2
Albatroz	5–1	Kalupe
Jēkabpils	0–3	Rēzeknes FA/BJSS
Pļaviņas DM	0–6	Kauguri
Talsi/Laidze	1–7	Grobiņas SC
Lokomotiv Daugavpils	7–0	Dobele Allegro
Super Nova	3–2 (a.e.t.)	Salaspils
Tente	0–2	Auda
Valka	2–5	Karosta
Limbaži	0–0 (5–6 p)	JDFS Alberts
Staiceles Bebri	1–2	Priekuļi
Dinamo Rīga	7–0	FK Alberts
Smiltene	2–0	Saldus SS/Leevon

== Third round ==
12 winners of the second round took part in the third round. The matches were played between 5 and 9 September 2020.

Team 1	Score	Team 2
Auda	5–1 (a.e.t.)	Super Nova
Lokomotiv Daugavpils	3–2	Albatroz
Smiltene	3–4 (a.e.t.)	Dinamo Rīga
Rēzeknes FA/BJSS	2–1	JDFS Alberts
Grobiņas SC	3–0	Karosta
Priekuļi	1–2	Kauguri

== Fourth round ==
6 winners of the third round are joined by 10 teams of Latvian Virslīga. The matches were played between 23 September and 1 October 2020.

Team 1	Score	Team 2
Dinamo Rīga	1–5	Valmiera
Grobiņas SC	2–5 (a.e.t.)	Spartaks Jūrmala
Lokomotiv Daugavpils	0–4	Ventspils
Rēzeknes FA/BJSS	1–3	Tukums
Liepāja	1–0	Daugavpils
Kauguri	0–9	Jelgava
Auda	0–8	RFS
Riga	4–0	Metta/LU

== Quarter-finals ==
8 winners of the fourth round take part in the quarter-finals. The matches were played on 21 October 2020.

Team 1	Score	Team 2
Jelgava	0–0 (3–4 p)	Ventspils
Spartaks Jūrmala	1–3	Liepāja
Valmiera	1–0	Tukums
RFS	3–2	Riga

== Semi-finals ==
4 winners of the quarter-finals take part in the semi-finals. The matches were played on 28 October 2020.

Team 1	Score	Team 2
Ventspils	1–0	RFS
Liepāja	2–0	Valmiera

== Final ==
The final was played on 8 November 2020.

8 November 2020
13:00

Liepāja	1–0 (a.e.t.)	Ventspils
Dodô 94'	Report

Ventspils Olimpiskais Stadions, Ventspils
Referee: Mareks Ķere

== See also ==
- 2020 Latvian Higher League
- 2020 Latvian First League
