= 2017 Latvian Football Cup =

Football competition held in Latvia

Tournament details
- Country: Latvia
- Teams: 52

Final positions
- Champions: Liepāja
- Runners-up: Riga FC

Tournament statistics
- Matches played: 43
- Goals scored: 206 (4.79 per match)

The 2017 Latvian Football Cup was the 23rd edition of the tournament that began on 28 May 2017 and ended on 18 October 2017. The winner of this season's cup earned a place in the first qualifying round of the 2018–19 Europa League.

In a change from recent seasons, the tournament was played in one calendar year instead of over two years. The tournament was played in its entirety in 2017

Ventspils were the defending champions.

== Format ==
The Latvian Football Cup this season was a single elimination tournament between 52 teams. Matches which were level after regulation went to extra time and afterwards to penalties, when needed, to determine the winning club.

== First round ==
Twelve first round matches were played from 28 May to 11 June 2017. The draw for the first round was held 24 May 2017. SK Super Nova withdrew from the tournament.

Team 1	Score	Team 2
28 May
Cēsis	0–3	FK Karosta
31 May
FK Sirius	0–2	FK Pļaviņas DM
2 June
JFC Dobele	1–0	Ludzas NSS
Talsi/FK Laidze	3–1	FK Roja/Kolka
3 June
FK Balvi	5–0	FK Limbaži
4 June
FK Nīca	0–1	FC Caramba Riga
Bauskas BJSS/SC Mēmele	0–3	FB Gulbene 2005
FK Salacgrīva	0–10	Ogres Novada SC
FK Traktors	1–1 (a.e.t.) (4–3 p)	Salaspils
5 June
SK Upesciems	2–0	New Project
FK Alberts	1–2	Monarhs/Flaminko
11 June
FC Nikers	w/o	SK Super Nova

== Second round ==
Sixteen second round matches were played from 10 to 26 June 2017. The draw for the second, third, and fourth rounds was held 6 June 2017. FK Auda, FK Smiltene/BJSS, JDFS Alberts, and FK Tukums 2000/TSS withdrew from the competition. SK Upesciems also withdrew.

Team 1	Score	Team 2
10 June
FC Nikers	5–1	Saldus SS/Brocēnu NBJSS
11 June
FC Caramba Riga	4–5	Grobiņas SC
18 June
FK Pļaviņas DM	2–1	FK Aliance
FB Gulbene 2005	1–5	FK Karosta
19 June
FK Staiceles Bebri	w/o	FK Smiltene/BJSS
BFC Daugavpils	w/o	JDFS Alberts
Talsi/FK Laidze	w/o	FK Auda
FK Tukums 2000 TSS	w/o	JFC Dobele
FK Jūrnieks Rīga	3–0	BFK Salaspils
20 June
Valmiera Glass FK/BSS	8–0	FK Priekuļi
22 June
Ogres NSC	0–3	Rēzeknes FA/BJSS
FK Lielupe	1–8	FK Jēkabpils/JSC
25 June
Monarhs/Flaminko	6–1	FK Balvi
RTU FC	6–1	FK Ogre
FK Traktors	0–6	Preiļu BJSS
26 June
SK Upesciems	w/o	Progress/AFA Olaine

1. The game was stopped on the 80th minute (with the score 11–0) because of BFK Salaspils players repeatedly breaking fair play and sporting principles. The match was awarded as a 3–0 win to Jūrnieks.

== Third round ==
Eight third round matches were played on 1 and 2 July 2017. The draw for the second, third, and fourth rounds was held 6 June 2017. FK Staiceles Bebri withdrew from the tournament.

Team 1	Score	Team 2
1 July
Rēzeknes FA/BJSS	0–2	BFC Daugavpils
FC Nikers	0–7	Progress/AFA Olaine
FK Karosta	5–3	Talsi/FK Laidze
FK Jūrnieks Rīga	2–5	FK Jēkabpils/JSC
Valmiera Glass FK/BSS	2–1	RTU FC
Grobiņas SC	w/o	FK Staiceles Bebri
2 July
Monarhs/Flaminko	12–0	JFC Dobele
Preiļu BJSS	6–0	FK Pļaviņas DM

== Fourth round ==
Eight fourth round matches were played from 7 to 10 July 2017. The draw for the second, third, and fourth rounds was held 6 June 2017. Babīte were excluded from the tournament.

Team 1	Score	Team 2
7 July
Grobiņas SC	0–2	Spartaks Jūrmala
8 July
Progress/AFA Olaine	0–4 (a.e.t.)	RFS
FK Karosta	w/o	Babīte
Valmiera Glass FK/BSS	0–3	METTA/LU
9 July
Monarhs/Flaminko	1–9	Ventspils
Preiļu BJSS	0–5	Riga FC
FK Jēkabpils/JSC	0–8	Jelgava
10 July
BFC Daugavpils	0–1	Liepāja

== Quarter–finals ==
Four quarter–final matches were played from 16 August to 13 September 2017. The draw was held 18 July 2017.

Team 1	Score	Team 2
Ventspils	1–2	Liepāja
Spartaks Jūrmala	1–0 (a.e.t.)	METTA/LU
FK Karosta	0–7	RFS
Riga FC	2–2 (a.e.t.) (3–1 p)	Jelgava

== Semi–finals ==
Two semi–final matches were played on 20 September 2017. The draw was held 18 July 2017.

Team 1	Score	Team 2
Liepāja	4–1	RFS
Riga FC	2–1 (a.e.t.)	Spartaks Jūrmala

== Final ==
The cup final was played on 18 October 2017.

18 October 2017

Liepāja	2–0	Riga FC

Skonto Stadium
Referee: Andris Treimanis

== See also ==
2017 Latvian Higher League
