= 2015–16 Latvian Football Cup =

Football competition held in Latvia

Tournament details
- Country: Latvia
- Teams: 50

The 2015–16 Latvian Football Cup was the 21st edition of the Latvian annual football knockout competition. The winners qualified for the first qualifying round of the 2016–17 UEFA Europa League.

== First round ==
The matches of this round took place on 8–22 June 2015.

Team 1	Score	Team 2
8 June
FK Dobele (3)	1–0	FK Alberts (3)
Babīte (3)	3–1	Ādaži (3)
9 June
Kuldīgas (3)	3–1	Nīca (3)
10 June
Lielupe (3)	2–1	FK Priekuļi (3)
13 June
Riga United (3)	w/o	Rīnūži-Strong (3)
14 June
Grobiņa (3)	w/o	Super Nova (3)
22 June
Ludzas NSS (3)	1–4	SK Kalnciema (3)

== Second round ==
The matches of this round took place on 4–8 July 2015.

Team 1	Score	Team 2
4 July
SK Kalnciema (3)	w/o	FK Ogre (2)
Auda (2)	1–0	Lāčplēsis (3)
Preiļu BJSS (2)	4–0	Kuldīgas (3)
Caramba/Dinamo (2)	5–0	Saldus (2)
Bandava (3)	0–3	Salaspils (2)
Staiceles Bebri (2)	1–3	JDFS Alberts (2)
Upesciems (3)	6–1	Fortūna (3)
Rīgas Futbola skola (2)	10–0	Grobiņa (3)
Valmieras (2)	7–0	Lielupe (3)
JFC Dobele (3)	0–6	Compact.lv (3)
5 July
Jēkabpils/JSC (2)	2–1	Riga United (3)
Monarhs (3)	7–1	Balvu (3)
7 July
Rēzeknes BJSS (2)	w/o	FC Marienburg (3)
8 July
Babīte (3)	3–1	Smiltene/BJSS (2)
Tukums 2000 TSS (2)	2–5	Olaine (2)

== Third round ==
The matches of this round took place on 11–13 July 2015.

Team 1	Score	Team 2
11 July
Compact.lv (3)	2–5	Preiļu BJSS (2)
Salaspils (2)	3–0	Upesciems (3)
Rīgas Futbola skola (2)	2–3	Caramba/Dinamo (2)
Olaine (2)	0–1	Babīte (3)
12 July
Monarhs (3)	1–3	Auda (2)
Valmieras (2)	10–1	SK Kalnciema (3)
Rēzeknes BJSS (2)	2–1	Jēkabpils/JSC (2)
13 July
JDFS Alberts (2)	8–1	FK Dobele (3)

== Round of 16 ==
The matches of this round took place from 18 July to 16 September 2015. Babīte received a bye.

Team 1	Score	Team 2
18 July
Valmieras (2)	0–2	BFC Daugavpils (1)
Rēzeknes BJSS (2)	0–4	METTA/LU (1)
Salaspils (2)	0–4	Liepāja (1)
19 July
JDFS Alberts (2)	0–4	Skonto (1)
29 July
Auda (2)	0–7	Ventspils (1)
5 August
Preiļu BJSS (2)	1–6	Spartaks (1)
16 September
FC Caramba/Dinamo (2)	0–1	Jelgava (1)

== Quarter-finals ==
The matches were played on 9, 10 and 13 April 2016.

Team 1	Score	Team 2
9 April
Ventspils (1)	1–0	Liepāja (1)
Spartaks Jūrmala (1)	3–1	Skonto (1)
10 April
METTA/LU (1)	0–2	BFC Daugavpils (1)
13 April
Babīte (2)	2–3	Jelgava (1)

== Semi-finals ==
The first leg were played on 27 April 2016 and the second leg on 4 May 2016.

Team 1	Agg.	Team 2	1st leg	2nd leg
Jelgava	2–1	Ventspils	0–1	2–0
BFC Daugavpils	0–2	Spartaks Jūrmala	0–1	0–1

== Final ==
22 May 2016
Slokas stadions (Sloka Stadium), Jūrmala
Referee : Aleksandrs Anufrijevs

Team 1	Score	Team 2
Jelgava	1–0	Spartaks Jūrmala
