= List of Latvian football transfers winter 2023–24 =

This is a list of Latvian football transfers in the winter transfer window 2023-24 by club. Only clubs of the 2024 Latvian Higher League and 2024 Latvian First League are included.

== Latvian Higher League ==
=== RFS ===
In: Note: Flags indicate national team as defined under FIFA eligibility rules; some limited exceptions apply. Players may hold more than one non-FIFA nationality.

No.	Pos.	Nation	Player
—	GK	LVA	Frenks Orols (loan return from Tukums 2000, later loaned to BFC Daugavpils)
—	GK	LVA	Jānis Beks (loan return from Metta/LU)
—	DF	LVA	Dāvis Cucurs (from BFC Daugavpils)
—	DF	LVA	Elvis Stuglis (from (Poland) Chrobry)
—	MF	JAM	Kenroy Campbell (loan return from BFC Daugavpils, later on loan to Tukums 2000)
—	MF	LVA	Efraims Valutadatils (loan return from BFC Daugavpils)
—	MF	JPN	Mikaze Nagasawa (loan return from Tukums 2000)
—	MF	BRA	Pedro Arthur (loan return from Tukums 2000)
—	MF	LVA	Rodrigo Gaučis (loan return from Tukums 2000, later loaned to Grobiņas SC/LFS)
—	MF	LVA	Renārs Varslavāns (loan return from Valmiera, later to Valmiera)
—	MF	LVA	Jevgēņijs Miņins (loan return from SK Super Nova, later loaned to BFC Daugavpils)
—	MF	LVA	Mārtiņš Ķigurs (Free agent)
—	MF	GAM	Haruna Rasid Njie (from (The Gambia) BST Galaxy)
—	MF	CMR	Rostand Ndjiki (on loan from (Spain) Leganés B, was on loan at SK Super Nova)
—	MF	CIV	Mohamed Kone (Free agent)
—	FW	LVA	Valerijs Lizunovs (loan return from BFC Daugavpils, later loaned to Tukums 2000)
—	FW	BIH	Aleksej Golijanin (loan return from (Serbia) Novi Pazar, later loaned to BFC Daugavpils)
—	FW	GEO	Lasha Odisharia (from (Georgia (country)) Dinamo Tbilisi)

Out: Note: Flags indicate national team as defined under FIFA eligibility rules; some limited exceptions apply. Players may hold more than one non-FIFA nationality.

No.	Pos.	Nation	Player
—	GK	LVA	Sergejs Vilkovs (on loan to Tukums 2000)
—	GK	LVA	Frenks Orols (on loan to BFC Daugavpils, was on loan at Tukums 2000)
—	DF	LVA	Vitālijs Jagodinskis (to (Bulgaria) Pirin)
—	DF	LVA	Vladislavs Sorokins (to (Kazakhstan) Kyzylzhar Petropavl)
—	MF	LVA	Artūrs Zjuzins (to (Cyprus) Omonia Aradippou, later to Liepāja)
—	MF	NGA	Adewale Oladoye (to (Belarus) Dynamo Brest)
—	MF	LVA	Daniels Ontužāns (to (Germany) FC 08 Homburg)
—	MF	LVA	Renārs Varslavāns (to Valmiera, was on loan)
—	MF	JAM	Kenroy Campbell (on loan to Tukums 2000, was on loan at BFC Daugavpils)
—	MF	LVA	Jevgēņijs Miņins (on loan to BFC Daugavpils, was on loan at SK Super Nova)
—	MF	LVA	Rodrigo Gaučis (on loan to Grobiņas SC/LFS, was loaned to Tukums 2000)
—	FW	LVA	Valerijs Lizunovs (on loan to Tukums 2000, was on loan at BFC Daugavpils)
—	FW	BIH	Aleksej Golijanin (on loan to BFC Daugavpils, was on loan at (Serbia) Novi Pazar)
—	FW	GAB	Floriss Djave (to (Georgia (country)) Iberia 1999)

=== Riga ===
In: Note: Flags indicate national team as defined under FIFA eligibility rules; some limited exceptions apply. Players may hold more than one non-FIFA nationality.

No.	Pos.	Nation	Player
—	GK	LVA	Iļja Isajevs (loan return from JFK Ventspils, later to Liepāja)
—	DF	SEN	Bakary Diawara (loan return from Auda, later to Auda)
—	DF	ARG	Iván Erquiaga (from (Argentina) Quilmes)
—	MF	ARG	Brian Orosco (on loan from (Argentina) Estudiantes (LP), was on loan at (Argentina) Deportivo Morón)
—	MF	ARG	Gonzalo Muscia (from (Argentina) Arsenal)
—	MF	BRA	Lucas Cardoso (on loan from (Brazil) Cuiabá, was on loan at (Brazil) Botafogo)
—	MF	LVA	Tomašs Mickēvičs (promoted from Academy)
—	FW	BFA	Ousmane Camara (from (Burkina Faso) Rahimo, later on loan to Auda)

Out: Note: Flags indicate national team as defined under FIFA eligibility rules; some limited exceptions apply. Players may hold more than one non-FIFA nationality.

No.	Pos.	Nation	Player
—	GK	LVA	Iļja Isajevs (to Liepāja, was on loan at JFK Ventspils)
—	DF	SEN	Mor Talla (loan return to Auda)
—	DF	PER	Gustavo Dulanto (released)
—	DF	SEN	Bakary Diawara (to Auda, was on loan)
—	MF	LVA	Deniss Meļņiks (loan return to Auda)
—	FW	BRA	Douglas Aurélio (to (Spain) Castellón)
—	FW	CRC	Anthony Contreras (on loan to (Cyprus) Pafos)
—	FW	BFA	Ousmane Camara (on loan to Auda)
—	FW	SEN	Meleye Diagne (to Auda, was on loan)

=== Auda ===
In: Note: Flags indicate national team as defined under FIFA eligibility rules; some limited exceptions apply. Players may hold more than one non-FIFA nationality.

No.	Pos.	Nation	Player
—	GK	LVA	Raivo Stūriņš (from Jelgava)
—	GK	LVA	Krišjānis Zviedris (from (Finland) SJK)
—	DF	SEN	Mor Talla (loan return from Riga)
—	DF	POR	Bruno Tavares (from (Cyprus) Pafos)
—	DF	SEN	Bakary Diawara (from Riga, previously on loan)
—	MF	LVA	Deniss Meļņiks (loan return from Riga)
—	MF	CIV	Aboubakar Karamoko (loan return from (United Arab Emirates) United)
—	MF	LVA	Raivis Ķiršs (loan return from Tukums 2000, later to (Poland) GKS Wikielec)
—	MF	LVA	Artūrs Krancmanis (loan return from Tukums 2000)
—	MF	BRA	Lucas Ramos (on loan from (Brazil) Internacional)
—	MF	BRA	Pablinho (on loan from (Brazil) Cuiabá)
—	FW	BFA	Ousmane Camara (on loan from Riga)
—	FW	SEN	Meleye Diagne (from Riga, previously on loan)

Out: Note: Flags indicate national team as defined under FIFA eligibility rules; some limited exceptions apply. Players may hold more than one non-FIFA nationality.

No.	Pos.	Nation	Player
—	GK	LVA	Roberts Ozols (to (Uzbekistan) Qizilqum)
—	DF	CRO	Božo Mikulić (to (Albania) Partizani)
—	DF	GER	Niko Bretschneider (to (Germany) Energie Cottbus)
—	DF	LVA	Armands Pētersons (to Jelgava)
—	DF	SEN	Amadou Ndiaye (end of contract)
—	DF	LVA	Jegors Novikovs (on loan to Metta/LU)
—	MF	SSD	Manyumow Achol (end of contract)
—	MF	BRA	Resende (end of contract)
—	MF	LVA	Raivis Ķiršs (to (Poland) GKS Wikielec, was on loan at Tukums 2000)
—	MF	CIV	Brahima Ouattara (to (United States) Hailstorm FC)
—	MF	HAI	Stevenson Jeudi (on loan to Tukums 2000)
—	MF	LVA	Daniils Ulimbaševs (to Metta)
—	MF	ARG	Mateo Piteo (released)
—	MF	CIV	Abdoul Kader Traore (on loan to Daugavpils)

=== Valmiera ===
In: Note: Flags indicate national team as defined under FIFA eligibility rules; some limited exceptions apply. Players may hold more than one non-FIFA nationality.

No.	Pos.	Nation	Player
—	GK	LVA	Dāvis Veisbuks (loan return from SK Super Nova)
—	GK	LVA	Dāvis Ošs (from Liepāja)
—	MF	LVA	Oļģerts Raščevskis (loan return from SK Super Nova, later loaned to BFC Daugavpils)
—	MF	LVA	Lūkass Vapne (on loan from Metta/LU)
—	MF	LVA	Renārs Varslavāns (from RFS, was on loan)
—	MF	JPN	Yusuke Omori (from (Japan) Tokai Fukuoka)
—	MF	JPN	Carlos Duke (from (Japan) SC Sagamihara)
—	MF	SVN	Črt Rotar (from (Slovenia) Ilirija)
—	MF	CRO	Branimir Cavar (on loan from (Croatia) Dubrava)
—	MF	LVA	Kevins Cēsinieks (from Jelgava)
—	FW	LVA	Kristers Lūsiņš (loan return from SK Super Nova)
—	FW	FRA	Jason Bahamboula (from (Portugal) V. Guimarães B)
—	FW	BRA	Lucas Aruba (from (Brazil) Bahia)

Out: Note: Flags indicate national team as defined under FIFA eligibility rules; some limited exceptions apply. Players may hold more than one non-FIFA nationality.

No.	Pos.	Nation	Player
—	DF	SEN	Pape Yare Fall (to Liepāja)
—	DF	UKR	Yevhen Opanasenko (to (Germany) SF Köllerbach)
—	MF	ALG	Adel Ghanem (loan return to (Algeria) MC Alger)
—	MF	TUN	Fraj Kayramani (to Liepāja)
—	MF	SEN	Victor Diagne (to (Slovenia) Dravinja)
—	MF	COL	Juan Peñaloza (to (China) Guangzhou)
—	MF	LVA	Oļģerts Raščevskis (on loan to BFC Daugavpils, was on loan at SK Super Nova)
—	MF	LVA	Kristers Čudars (on loan to Grobiņa)
—	FW	BRA	Ruan Ribeiro (loan return to (Brazil) Palmeiras U-20, later on loan to (Brazil) Paysandu)

=== Liepāja ===
In: Note: Flags indicate national team as defined under FIFA eligibility rules; some limited exceptions apply. Players may hold more than one non-FIFA nationality.

No.	Pos.	Nation	Player
—	GK	LVA	Vladislavs Kurakins (from BFC Daugavpils)
—	GK	LVA	Iļja Isajevs (from Riga, was on loan at JFK Ventspils)
—	DF	SEN	Pape Yare Fall (from Valmiera)
—	DF	LVA	Normunds Uldriķis (from Metta/LU)
—	DF	LVA	Alans Kangars (from Skanste)
—	DF	NED	Lassana Faye (from (Netherlands) Telstar)
—	DF	MDA	Artiom Rozgoniuc (from (Poland) Olimpia Grudziądz)
—	DF	GEO	Vazha Patsatsia (from (Georgia (country)) Telavi)
—	DF	AUT	Stipe Vučur (from (Lithuania) Žalgiris)
—	DF	SEN	Cheikh Diouf (from (Senegal) Diambars)
—	MF	LVA	Armans Muradjans (from Grobiņas SC/LFS)
—	MF	GEO	Rati Ardazishvili (from (Kazakhstan) Zhetysu)
—	MF	GEO	Luka Silagadze (from (Georgia (country)) Saburtalo)
—	MF	TUN	Fraj Kayramani (from Valmiera)
—	MF	LVA	Artūrs Zjuzins (from (Cyprus) Omonia Aradippou)
—	MF	JPN	Yasuhiro Hanada (from (Lithuania) Garliava, later loaned to Grobiņas SC/LFS)
—	MF	LVA	Ivans Patrikejevs (from Super Nova)
—	MF	LVA	Edgars Ivanovs (to Daugavpils)
—	MF	GEO	Andria Khorkheli (from (Georgia (country)) Sioni)
—	FW	ARM	Arams Bagdasarjans (from Riga U-18)
—	FW	SEN	Rassoul Ba (from (Lithuania) Jonava)

Out: Note: Flags indicate national team as defined under FIFA eligibility rules; some limited exceptions apply. Players may hold more than one non-FIFA nationality.

No.	Pos.	Nation	Player
—	GK	LVA	Dāvis Ošs (to Valmiera)
—	GK	GEO	Luka Sanikidze (to (Georgia (country)) Shturmi)
—	GK	LVA	Ņikita Pinčuks (to Grobiņa)
—	DF	UKR	Yurii Mate (to (Kyrgyzstan) Muras United)
—	DF	BEL	Henri Stanic (to (Norway) Jerv)
—	DF	SEN	Bilaly Diallo (released)
—	DF	SEN	Mame Tine (released)
—	DF	MDA	Artiom Rozgoniuc (released, later to Grobiņa)
—	DF	SEN	Bacary Sané (to (Lithuania) Džiugas)
—	MF	GEO	Nikoloz Tskhovrebashvili (loan return to (Georgia (country)) Dinamo Tbilisi)
—	MF	GEO	Davit Samurkasovi (to (Georgia (country)) Locomotive)
—	MF	LVA	Aleksejs Grjaznovs (to Super Nova)
—	MF	LVA	Gļebs Kļuškins (to Jelgava)
—	MF	NGA	Luqman Gilmore (to (Armenia) Urartu)
—	MF	GHA	David Anane Martin (to (Lithuania) Kauno Žalgiris)
—	MF	JPN	Yasuhiro Hanada (on loan to Grobiņas SC/LFS)
—	FW	NGA	Success Makanjuola (released)
—	MF	LVA	Roberts Meļķis (on loan to Grobiņa)
—	FW	NED	Nino Noordanus (to (Lithuania) Džiugas)
—	FW	LVA	Markuss Kruglaužs (to Grobiņa)

=== Jelgava ===
In: Note: Flags indicate national team as defined under FIFA eligibility rules; some limited exceptions apply. Players may hold more than one non-FIFA nationality.

No.	Pos.	Nation	Player
—	GK	LVA	Mārtiņš Veļika (from Jelgava II)
—	GK	LVA	Vjačeslavs Kudrjavcevs (from Super Nova)
—	DF	LVA	Gļebs Kačanovs (from Riga II)
—	DF	RWA	Dylan Maes (Free agent)
—	MF	LVA	Gļebs Kļuškins (from Liepāja)
—	MF	LVA	Armands Pētersons (from Auda)
—	FW	NGA	Joseph Oloko Ede (from (Czech Republic) Silon)
—		LVA	Mārcis Šusts (from Jelgava II)

Out: Note: Flags indicate national team as defined under FIFA eligibility rules; some limited exceptions apply. Players may hold more than one non-FIFA nationality.

No.	Pos.	Nation	Player
—	GK	LVA	Raivo Stūriņš (to Auda)
—	GK	LVA	Kristers Bite (to Super Nova)
—	DF	LVA	Valērijs Redjko (Appointed Head Coach)
—	DF	UKR	Vladyslav Veremeev (to (Slovakia) Michalovce)
—	DF	LVA	Roberts Zelmanis (to (Sweden) Gute)
—	DF	LVA	Roberts Čevers (to Super Nova)
—	DF	LVA	Dāvis Vējkrīgers (to Super Nova)
—	DF	LVA	Rūdolfs Zeņģis (to Super Nova)
—	MF	LVA	Vladislavs Žihs (to Super Nova)
—	MF	LVA	Kevins Cēsinieks (to Valmiera)
—	MF	JPN	Ryuga Nakamura (to Super Nova)
—	FW	NGA	Victor Osuagwu (loan return to (Czech Republic) SK Slavia Prague B)
—	FW	UKR	Vadym Mashchenko (to (Poland) Karpaty Krosno)

=== Daugavpils ===
In: Note: Flags indicate national team as defined under FIFA eligibility rules; some limited exceptions apply. Players may hold more than one non-FIFA nationality.

No.	Pos.	Nation	Player
—	GK	LVA	Frenks Orols (on loan from RFS, was on loan at Tukums 2000)
—	GK	LVA	Ņikita Šaraņins (from FK Kalupe)
—	DF	LVA	Rainers Tomass Urujevs (from FK Līvāni)
—	DF	LVA	Gļebs Mihaļcovs (from (England) Irchester United)
—	MF	GAM	Wally Fofana (Free agent)
—	MF	LVA	Oļģerts Raščevskis (on loan from Valmiera, was on loan at SK Super Nova)
—	MF	LVA	Jevgēņijs Miņins (on loan from RFS, was on loan at SK Super Nova)
—	MF	LVA	Raivis Skrebels (from Super Nova)
—	MF	CIV	Abdoul Kader Traore (on loan from Auda)
—	FW	BIH	Aleksej Golijanin (on loan from RFS, was on loan at (Serbia) Novi Pazar)
—	FW	SEN	Barthélémy Diedhiou (from (France) Lille B)

Out: Note: Flags indicate national team as defined under FIFA eligibility rules; some limited exceptions apply. Players may hold more than one non-FIFA nationality.

No.	Pos.	Nation	Player
—	GK	LVA	Vladislavs Kurakins (to Liepāja)
—	DF	GHA	Moses Salifu Bawa Zuure (end of contract)
—	DF	CZE	Jaroslav Harušťák (loan return to (Czech Republic) MFK Chrudim)
—	DF	LVA	Dāvis Cucurs (to RFS)
—	MF	AZE	Ramin Nasirli (loan return to (Azerbaijan) Neftçi)
—	MF	JAM	Kenroy Campbell (loan return to RFS, later on loan to Tukums 2000)
—	MF	LVA	Efraims Valutadatils (loan return to RFS)
—	MF	LVA	Edgars Ivanovs (to Liepāja)
—	FW	LVA	Valerijs Lizunovs (loan return to RFS, later on loan to Tukums 2000)
—	FW	LVA	Ričards Žaldovskis (released)

=== Tukums 2000 ===
In: Note: Flags indicate national team as defined under FIFA eligibility rules; some limited exceptions apply. Players may hold more than one non-FIFA nationality.

No.	Pos.	Nation	Player
—	GK	LVA	Sergejs Vilkovs (on loan from RFS)
—	GK	LVA	Ruslans Šemetovs (on loan from Riga II)
—	MF	LVA	Kristaps Kārlis Krieviņš (on loan from Riga II)
—	MF	UKR	Maksym Parkhomenko (on loan from Riga II)
—	MF	JAM	Kenroy Campbell (on loan from RFS, was on loan at BFC Daugavpils)
—	MF	HAI	Stevenson Jeudi (on loan from Auda)
—	FW	LVA	Valerijs Lizunovs (on loan from RFS, was on loan at BFC Daugavpils)

Out: Note: Flags indicate national team as defined under FIFA eligibility rules; some limited exceptions apply. Players may hold more than one non-FIFA nationality.

No.	Pos.	Nation	Player
—	GK	LVA	Frenks Orols (loan return to RFS)
—	DF	LVA	Aleksandrs Butovskis (to Super Nova)
—	DF	LVA	Kārlis Mikuļskis (to Grobiņas SC/LFS)
—	MF	JPN	Mikaze Nagasawa (loan return to RFS)
—	MF	BRA	Pedro Arthur (loan return to RFS)
—	MF	LVA	Rodrigo Gaučis (loan return to RFS)
—	MF	LVA	Raivis Ķiršs (loan return to Auda, later to (Poland) GKS Wikielec)
—	MF	LVA	Artūrs Krancmanis (loan return to Auda)
—	MF	UKR	Ivan Koshkosh (to (Lithuania) TransINVEST)
—	FW	LVA	Kristaps Puzānovs (released)
—	FW	LVA	Armans Galajs (to (Slovenia) Fužinar)

=== Metta ===
In: Note: Flags indicate national team as defined under FIFA eligibility rules; some limited exceptions apply. Players may hold more than one non-FIFA nationality.

No.	Pos.	Nation	Player
—	GK	LVA	Alvis Sorokins (loan return from Skanste)
—	DF	LVA	Jegors Novikovs (on loan from Auda)
—	DF	LVA	Maksims Semeško (on loan from Riga II)
—	MF	LVA	Tomass Zants (loan return from Skanste)
—	MF	LVA	Hugo Jesse (from Skanste)
—	MF	UKR	Yevhen Stadnik (on loan from Riga II)
—	MF	LVA	Markuss Ivulāns (from Skanste)
—	MF	LVA	Daniils Ulimbaševs (from Auda)
—	MF	USA	Jordan Bender (from (South Africa) Cape Town)
—	MF	GHA	Mahamud Karimu (Free agent)
—	FW	LVA	Dans Sirbu (from Riga II, previously on loan)

Out: Note: Flags indicate national team as defined under FIFA eligibility rules; some limited exceptions apply. Players may hold more than one non-FIFA nationality.

No.	Pos.	Nation	Player
—	GK	LVA	Jānis Beks (loan return to RFS)
—	DF	LVA	Normunds Uldriķis (to Liepāja)
—	DF	LVA	Gabriels Kirkils (to Leevon PPK)
—	DF	GEO	Zurab Rukhadze (to (Georgia (country)) Dila Gori)
—	DF	LTU	Kristupas Keršys (on loan to (Lithuania) Šiauliai)
—	MF	LVA	Deniss Stradiņš (to (Czech Republic) Baník)
—	MF	LVA	Lūkass Vapne (on loan to Valmiera)
—	MF	LVA	Vladislavs Fjodorovs (released)
—	FW	JPN	Takaya Sasaki (to (Finland) Jazz)
—	FW	SEN	Yaya Kamara (end of contract)
—	FW	LVA	Artjoms Puzirevskis (on loan to (North Macedonia) Tikvesh)

=== Grobiņa ===
In: Note: Flags indicate national team as defined under FIFA eligibility rules; some limited exceptions apply. Players may hold more than one non-FIFA nationality.

No.	Pos.	Nation	Player
—	GK	LVA	Ņikita Pinčuks (from Liepāja)
—	DF	LVA	Kārlis Mikuļskis (from Tukums 2000)
—	DF	LVA	Raimonds Sāmietis (from Karosta)
—	DF	LVA	Krišjānis Rupeiks (from Liepājas FS)
—	DF	MDA	Artiom Rozgoniuc (Free agent)
—	MF	JPN	Yasuhiro Hanada (on loan from Liepāja)
—	MF	LVA	Rodrigo Gaučis (on loan from RFS, was loaned to Tukums 2000)
—	MF	LVA	Kristers Čudars (on loan from Valmiera)
—	MF	LVA	Roberts Meļķis (on loan from Liepāja)
—	MF	SEN	Pape Doudou (from (Senegal) Diambars)
—	MF	LVA	Martins Raihs (from Liepāja II)
—	MF	LVA	Roberts Untulis (from Liepāja II)
—	FW	LVA	Markuss Kruglaužs (from Liepāja)
—	FW	UKR	Denys Halata (from (Ukraine) Metalurh)
—	FW	LVA	Ralfs Bethers (from Liepājas FS)

Out: Note: Flags indicate national team as defined under FIFA eligibility rules; some limited exceptions apply. Players may hold more than one non-FIFA nationality.

No.	Pos.	Nation	Player
—	GK	LVA	Viktors Spole (retired)
—	DF	LVA	Mārtiņš Blumbergs (released)
—	DF	LVA	Adrians Leo Zommers (released)
—	MF	LVA	Armans Muradjans (to Liepāja)
—	MF	LVA	Alekss Andersons (released)
—	MF	LVA	Edgars Freimanis (released)
—	MF	LVA	Viktors Ziemelis (released)
—	MF	LVA	Rainers Hermanis (released)
—	MF	LVA	Maksims Babjuks (released)
—	MF	LVA	Rihards Ponomarjovs (released)
—	MF	LVA	Artis Ušpelis (released)
—	MF	LVA	Kristaps Valters Deviņš (released)
—	MF	LVA	Aleksandrs Ožovans (released)
—	FW	LVA	Marks Kurtišs (to Leevon PPK)

== Latvian First League ==
=== Super Nova ===
In: Note: Flags indicate national team as defined under FIFA eligibility rules; some limited exceptions apply. Players may hold more than one non-FIFA nationality.

No.	Pos.	Nation	Player
—	GK	LVA	Kristers Bite (from Jelgava)
—	GK	AZE	Osman Huseynov (from Riga FC Academy)
—	DF	LVA	Raitis Roga (from Leevon PPK)
—	DF	LVA	Aleksandrs Butovskis (from Tukums 2000)
—	DF	UKR	Dmytro Mamich (Free agent)
—	DF	LVA	Roberts Čevers (from Jelgava)
—	DF	LVA	Rūdolfs Zeņģis (from Jelgava)
—	DF	LVA	Dāvis Vējkrīgers (from Jelgava)
—	MF	LVA	Vladislavs Žihs (from Jelgava)
—	MF	LVA	Klimentijs Manija (from RFS-2)
—	MF	LVA	Kristers Skadmanis (from Jelgava-2)
—	MF	LVA	Rinalds Sadovņikovs (from Leevon PPK)
—	MF	LVA	Timurs Abramenko (from Riga FC Academy)
—	MF	LVA	Ričards Penka (from (Italy) San Marzano Calcio)
—	MF	LVA	Zakars Tatevosjans (from RFS-2)
—	MF	LVA	Aleksejs Grjaznovs (from Liepāja)
—	MF	JPN	Ryuga Nakamura (from Jelgava)
—	FW	LVA	Miks Grasmanis Laše (from Liepājas FS)
—	FW	LVA	Haralds Silagailis (from (Slovakia) Košice)
—		LVA	Kristofers Jātnieks Labucks (from JDFS Alberts)
—		LVA	Rems Gastons Dzeguze (from JDFS Alberts)

Out: Note: Flags indicate national team as defined under FIFA eligibility rules; some limited exceptions apply. Players may hold more than one non-FIFA nationality.

No.	Pos.	Nation	Player
—	GK	LVA	Dāvis Veisbuks (loan return to Valmiera)
—	GK	LVA	Vjačeslavs Kudrjavcevs (to Jelgava)
—	MF	LVA	Oļģerts Raščevskis (loan return to Valmiera, later on loan to BFC Daugavpils)
—	DF	CMR	Mike Priso (loan return to (Spain) Leganés B)
—	DF	UGA	Allan Enyou (loan return to (Spain) Leganés B)
—	DF	LVA	Raitis Roga (to Mārupe)
—	MF	LVA	Jevgēņijs Miņins (loan return to RFS)
—	MF	CMR	Rostand Ndjiki (loan return to (Spain) Leganés B, later on loan to RFS)
—	MF	LVA	Raivis Skrebels (to Daugavpils)
—	MF	LVA	Ivans Patrikejevs (to Liepāja)
—	MF	LVA	Rinalds Sadovņikovs (to Mārupe)
—	FW	NGA	Ahanna Grant Williams (loan return to (Czech Republic) Vyškov)
—	FW	SSD	Dani Lual Gumnok (loan return to (Czech Republic) Vyškov)
—	FW	LVA	Kristers Lūsiņš (loan return to Valmiera)
—	FW	LVA	Artūrs Ostapenko (to (Czech Republic) Slavia)

=== Riga-2 ===
In: Note: Flags indicate national team as defined under FIFA eligibility rules; some limited exceptions apply. Players may hold more than one non-FIFA nationality.

No.	Pos.	Nation	Player

Out: Note: Flags indicate national team as defined under FIFA eligibility rules; some limited exceptions apply. Players may hold more than one non-FIFA nationality.

No.	Pos.	Nation	Player
—	GK	LVA	Ruslans Šemetovs (to Tukums 2000)
—	DF	LVA	Maksims Semeško (on loan to Metta)
—	DF	LVA	Gļebs Kačanovs (to Jelgava)
—	MF	LVA	Kristaps Kārlis Krieviņš (on loan to Tukums 2000)
—	MF	UKR	Maksym Parkhomenko (on loan to Tukums 2000)
—	MF	UKR	Yevhen Stadnik (on loan to Metta)
—	MF	LVA	Krišs Andersons (to JDFS Alberts)
—	FW	LVA	Dans Sirbu (to Metta, previously on loan)

=== Skanste ===
In: Note: Flags indicate national team as defined under FIFA eligibility rules; some limited exceptions apply. Players may hold more than one non-FIFA nationality.

No.	Pos.	Nation	Player

Out: Note: Flags indicate national team as defined under FIFA eligibility rules; some limited exceptions apply. Players may hold more than one non-FIFA nationality.

No.	Pos.	Nation	Player
—	GK	LVA	Alvis Sorokins (loan return to Metta/LU)
—	DF	LVA	Linards Liepiņš (to (Italy) Trapani)
—	DF	LVA	Alans Kangars (to Liepāja)
—	MF	LVA	Tomass Zants (loan return to Metta/LU)
—	MF	LVA	Hugo Jesse (to Metta/LU)
—	MF	LVA	Markuss Ivulāns (to Metta)

=== Alberts ===
In: Note: Flags indicate national team as defined under FIFA eligibility rules; some limited exceptions apply. Players may hold more than one non-FIFA nationality.

No.	Pos.	Nation	Player
—	MF	LVA	Krišs Andersons (from Riga II)

Out: Note: Flags indicate national team as defined under FIFA eligibility rules; some limited exceptions apply. Players may hold more than one non-FIFA nationality.

No.	Pos.	Nation	Player
—	GK	LVA	Nauris Nizinskis (to Rēzekne)
—		LVA	Kristofers Jātnieks Labucks (to Super Nova)
—		LVA	Rems Gastons Dzeguze (to Super Nova)

=== Leevon PPK ===
In: Note: Flags indicate national team as defined under FIFA eligibility rules; some limited exceptions apply. Players may hold more than one non-FIFA nationality.

No.	Pos.	Nation	Player
—	DF	LVA	Gabriels Kirkils (from Metta)
—	MF	LVA	Gregors Helmanis (from RFS-2)
—	FW	LVA	Marks Kurtišs (from Grobiņa)

Out: Note: Flags indicate national team as defined under FIFA eligibility rules; some limited exceptions apply. Players may hold more than one non-FIFA nationality.

No.	Pos.	Nation	Player
—	DF	LVA	Raitis Roga (to Super Nova, later to Mārupe)
—	MF	LVA	Rinalds Sadovņikovs (to Super Nova, later to Mārupe)

=== RFS-2 ===
In: Note: Flags indicate national team as defined under FIFA eligibility rules; some limited exceptions apply. Players may hold more than one non-FIFA nationality.

No.	Pos.	Nation	Player

Out: Note: Flags indicate national team as defined under FIFA eligibility rules; some limited exceptions apply. Players may hold more than one non-FIFA nationality.

No.	Pos.	Nation	Player
—	MF	LVA	Klimentijs Manija (to Super Nova)
—	MF	LVA	Zakars Tatevosjans (to Super Nova)
—	MF	LVA	Gregors Helmanis (to Leevon PPK)

=== Tukums 2000-2 ===
In: Note: Flags indicate national team as defined under FIFA eligibility rules; some limited exceptions apply. Players may hold more than one non-FIFA nationality.

No.	Pos.	Nation	Player

Out: Note: Flags indicate national team as defined under FIFA eligibility rules; some limited exceptions apply. Players may hold more than one non-FIFA nationality.

No.	Pos.	Nation	Player

=== JFK Ventspils ===
In: Note: Flags indicate national team as defined under FIFA eligibility rules; some limited exceptions apply. Players may hold more than one non-FIFA nationality.

No.	Pos.	Nation	Player
—	MF	TOG	Pierre Hounlete (on loan from (Lithuania) Be1)
—	MF	COL	Maifer Obregon (from (Lithuania) Baltijos FA)

Out: Note: Flags indicate national team as defined under FIFA eligibility rules; some limited exceptions apply. Players may hold more than one non-FIFA nationality.

No.	Pos.	Nation	Player
—	GK	LVA	Iļja Isajevs (loan return to Riga, later to Liepāja)

=== Valmiera-2 ===
In: Note: Flags indicate national team as defined under FIFA eligibility rules; some limited exceptions apply. Players may hold more than one non-FIFA nationality.

No.	Pos.	Nation	Player

Out: Note: Flags indicate national team as defined under FIFA eligibility rules; some limited exceptions apply. Players may hold more than one non-FIFA nationality.

No.	Pos.	Nation	Player

=== Olaine ===
In: Note: Flags indicate national team as defined under FIFA eligibility rules; some limited exceptions apply. Players may hold more than one non-FIFA nationality.

No.	Pos.	Nation	Player
—	FW	LVA	Edgars Brics (from Dinamo)

Out: Note: Flags indicate national team as defined under FIFA eligibility rules; some limited exceptions apply. Players may hold more than one non-FIFA nationality.

No.	Pos.	Nation	Player

=== Smiltene ===
In: Note: Flags indicate national team as defined under FIFA eligibility rules; some limited exceptions apply. Players may hold more than one non-FIFA nationality.

No.	Pos.	Nation	Player

Out: Note: Flags indicate national team as defined under FIFA eligibility rules; some limited exceptions apply. Players may hold more than one non-FIFA nationality.

No.	Pos.	Nation	Player

=== Rēzekne ===
In: Note: Flags indicate national team as defined under FIFA eligibility rules; some limited exceptions apply. Players may hold more than one non-FIFA nationality.

No.	Pos.	Nation	Player
—	GK	LVA	Nauris Nizinskis (from JDFS Alberts)
—	FW	LVA	Egīls Jegorovs (from Krāslava)

Out: Note: Flags indicate national team as defined under FIFA eligibility rules; some limited exceptions apply. Players may hold more than one non-FIFA nationality.

No.	Pos.	Nation	Player

=== Mārupe ===
In: Note: Flags indicate national team as defined under FIFA eligibility rules; some limited exceptions apply. Players may hold more than one non-FIFA nationality.

No.	Pos.	Nation	Player
—	GK	LVA	Andrejs Kļancevičs (from (Germany) FC Oberlausitz Neugersdorf)
—	DF	LVA	Raitis Roga (from Super Nova)
—	MF	LVA	Rinalds Sadovņikovs (from Super Nova)
—	FW	COD	Yousouf Abedi Rodo (from (Democratic Republic of the Congo) Saint Christian)

Out: Note: Flags indicate national team as defined under FIFA eligibility rules; some limited exceptions apply. Players may hold more than one non-FIFA nationality.

No.	Pos.	Nation	Player

=== Ogre United ===
In: Note: Flags indicate national team as defined under FIFA eligibility rules; some limited exceptions apply. Players may hold more than one non-FIFA nationality.

No.	Pos.	Nation	Player
—	DF	LVA	Krists Kristers Gulbis (from (Finland) Jaro)
—	DF	LVA	Niks Rubezis (from (Germany) 1. FC Neukölln)
—	MF	LVA	Sandis Spārns (from Preiļu BJSS)
—	FW	LVA	Rihards Juhnovičs (from Madonas BJSS)
—		LVA	Markuss Kaļva (from FK Veina Aizkraukle)
—		LVA	Roberts Hščanovičs (from FK Veina Aizkraukle)

Out: Note: Flags indicate national team as defined under FIFA eligibility rules; some limited exceptions apply. Players may hold more than one non-FIFA nationality.

No.	Pos.	Nation	Player
