= 2013–14 Latvian Football Cup =

Football competition held in Latvia

Tournament details
- Country: Latvia
- Teams: 40

The 2013–14 Latvian Football Cup was the 19th edition of the Latvian annual football knockout competition. The winners will qualify for the first qualifying round of the 2014–15 UEFA Europa League.

== First round ==
The matches of this round took place between 12 and 22 June 2013.

Team 1	Score	Team 2
12 June
Olaine (3)	4–0	Riga United (3)
14 June
Alberts (3)	2–1	Pļaviņas DM (3)
15 June
FK Smiltene (3)	1–3	Preiļu BJSS (3)
Kalupe (3)	0–2	Upesciems (3)
16 June
Ozolnieki (3)	0–2	Grobiņa (3)
20 June
FK Dinamo Rīga (3)	2–0	Kuldīgas NSS (3)
22 June
Carnikava (3)	6–3	Rita/Lerona (3)
Marienburg (3)	1–3	FK Dobele (3)

== Second round ==
The matches of this round took place between 5 and 14 July 2013.

Team 1	Score	Team 2
5 July
Upesciems (3)	0–4	Daugava (1)
Balvu SC (3)	0–4	JDFS Alberts (3)
Rīnūži-Strong (3)	1–6	Jelgava (1)
6 July
DSVK Traktors (3)	0–8	Ilūkstes NSS (1)
Grobiņas SC (3)	0–8	Daugava Rīga (1)
Auda (2)	0–2	Valmiera/BJSS (2)
Rēzeknes BJSS (2)	0–1	Jūrmala (1)
Olaine (3)	0–1 (a.e.t.)	SFK Varavīksne (2)
Rīgas FS (2)	1–0	Metta/LU (1)
7 July
Gulbene (2)	4–1	Dinamo Rīga (3)
Dobele (3)	0–3	FK Spartaks (1)
BFC Daugava (2)	5–3	Rita/Lerona (3)
FK Jēkabpils/JSC (2)	0–1	FK Tukums-2000 (2)
FK Alberts (3)	1–8	Skonto (1)
JFK Saldus (3)	0–6	FK Ventspils (1)
14 July
Preiļu BJSS (3)	2–11	FK Liepājas Metalurgs (1)

== Third round ==
The matches of this round took place between 19 July and 7 September 2013.

Team 1	Score	Team 2
19 July
FK Spartaks (1)	2–4	FK Liepājas Metalurgs (1)
20 July
SFK Varavīksne (2)	2–3	Gulbene (2)
FK Tukums-2000 (2)	0–5	Jūrmala (1)
21 July
Jelgava (1)	3–1	Valmiera/BJSS (2)
Skonto (1)	5–0	Rīgas FS (2)
Daugava Rīga (1)	3–1 (a.e.t.)	BFC Daugava (2)
6 September
Ilūkstes NSS (1)	0–3	FK Ventspils (1)
7 September
JDFS Alberts (3)	0–4	Daugava (1)

== Quarter-finals ==
The matches of this round took place on 4 and 5 April 2014.

Team 1	Score	Team 2
4 April
Daugava (1)	2–1	FK Ventspils (1)
FK Liepājas Metalurgs (1)	2–1	Jūrmala (1)
5 April
Gulbene (2)	0–2	Jelgava (1)
Daugava Rīga (1)	1–2	Skonto (1)

4 April 2014	FC Daugava	2–1	FK Ventspils	Celtnieks Stadium, Daugavpils
17:00	Jaliashvili 12'; Kokins 80'	Report	Dubra 90+2'

4 April 2014	Liepājas Metalurgs	2–1	FC Jūrmala	Daugava Stadium, Liepāja
19:00	Mežs 28'; Hoshino 79'	Report	Trecarichi 31'	Referee: Jevgēnijs Vasjukovs

5 April 2014	Gulbene	0–2	Jelgava	Gulbenes Sporta Centrs, Gulbene
13:00		Report	Kozlovs 46'; Diakvnišvili 74'

5 April 2014	Daugava Rīga	1–2	Skonto	Kauguru vidusskolas stadions, Jūrmala
15:00	Ziļs 4'	Report	Klimiashvili 47'; Mingazow 66'

== Semi-finals ==
23 April 2014	Jelgava	1–0 (a.e.t.)	Liepājas Metalurgs	Zemgales Olimpiskais Sporta Centrs, Jelgava
17:30	Kozlovs 107'	Report		Referee: Ivars Caune

23 April 2014	Skonto	4–0	Daugava Daugavpils	Skonto Stadium, Riga
19:00	Isajevs 11'; Gutkovskis 17'; Osipovs 45+1' (pen.); Šabala 83'

== Final ==
21 May 2014
18:00

Jelgava	0–0 (a.e.t.)	Skonto
Penalties
Redjko (penalty scored); Gubins (penalty scored); Malašenoks (penalty scored); Ikstens (penalty scored); Bogdaškins (penalty scored)	5–3	(penalty scored) Mingazow; (penalty scored) Gutkovskis; (penalty missed) Appiah; (penalty scored) Osipovs

Olympic Sports Center of Zemgale, Jelgava, Latvia
