= List of Latvian football transfers summer 2026 =

This is a list of Latvian football transfers in the summer transfer window 2026 by club. Only clubs of the 2026 Latvian Higher League and 2026 Latvian First League are included.

== Latvian Higher League ==
=== Riga ===
In: Note: Flags indicate national team as defined under FIFA eligibility rules; some limited exceptions apply. Players may hold more than one non-FIFA nationality.

No.	Pos.	Nation	Player
—	GK	BIH	Kenan Pirić (from (Azerbaijan) Neftçi)
—	GK	GRE	Athanasios Papadoudis (from (Cyprus) Pafos)
—	DF	NGR	Nor Maviram (from (Portugal) Tondela)
—	MF	MLI	Coli Saco (from (Italy) Napoli)
—	MF	POR	Samuel Pedro (from (United Arab Emirates) United)
—	FW	NGR	Abdulrahman Taiwo (loan return from (Slovakia) Spartak Trnava)

Out: Note: Flags indicate national team as defined under FIFA eligibility rules; some limited exceptions apply. Players may hold more than one non-FIFA nationality.

No.	Pos.	Nation	Player
—	MF	ESP	Brian Peña (to Auda)
—	MF	BRA	Juan Christian (on loan to (Brazil) Juventude)

=== RFS ===
In: Note: Flags indicate national team as defined under FIFA eligibility rules; some limited exceptions apply. Players may hold more than one non-FIFA nationality.

No.	Pos.	Nation	Player
—	GK	LAT	Rihards Matrevics (from (Czech Republic) FK Dukla Prague)
—	GK	LAT	Sergejs Vilkovs (loan return from Super Nova)
—	MF	ARG	Facundo García (loan return from Super Nova)
—	FW	CMR	Rostand Ndjiki (loan return from Daugavpils)
—	FW	CIV	Mamadou Sylla (loan return from Daugavpils)
—	FW	LAT	Niks Dusalijevs (from Tukums 2000, previously on loan)
—	FW	CRO	Duje Korač (from (Croatia) Rudeš)
—	FW	POR	Alfa Mussa Balde (from (Serbia) Radnički 1923)

Out: Note: Flags indicate national team as defined under FIFA eligibility rules; some limited exceptions apply. Players may hold more than one non-FIFA nationality.

No.	Pos.	Nation	Player
—	GK	LAT	Vladislavs Razumejevs (loan return to Daugavpils)
—	GK	LAT	Sergejs Vilkovs (to Tukums 2000)
—	MF	ARG	Facundo García (to (Cyprus) Omonia 29M)
—	MF	POR	Matheus Clemente (to (Cyprus) Akritas Chlorakas)
—	MF	JPN	Mikaze Nagasawa (Released)
—	MF	SEN	Mor Talla (to (Ukraine) Bukovyna)

=== Liepāja ===
In: Note: Flags indicate national team as defined under FIFA eligibility rules; some limited exceptions apply. Players may hold more than one non-FIFA nationality.

No.	Pos.	Nation	Player
—	DF	LAT	Aleksandrs Molotkovs (loan return from Grobiņa)
—	DF	BRA	João Borges (from (Brazil) Jacuipense)
—	DF	NGR	Favour Ogono (from (Nigeria) Right2Win)
—	DF	ANG	Romano Domingos (from (Angola) Guelson)
—	MF	ARG	Leonel Strumia (from (Kazakhstan) Caspiy)
—	MF	POR	Afonso Leite (from (Portugal) Braga U23)
—	FW	NGR	Joseph Oloko Ede (loan return from Tukums 2000)
—	FW	KGZ	Beknaz Almazbekov (from (Ukraine) Rukh)
—	FW	BRA	Crysthyan Lucas (on loan from (Brazil) Londrina)

Out: Note: Flags indicate national team as defined under FIFA eligibility rules; some limited exceptions apply. Players may hold more than one non-FIFA nationality.

No.	Pos.	Nation	Player
—	DF	LAT	Oskars Vientiess (to (Czech Republic) Chrudim, was on loan)
—	DF	LAT	Aleksandrs Molotkovs (on loan to Ogre United)
—	DF	LAT	Jānis Grīnbergs (to Ogre United)
—	DF	POR	Amílcar Silva (Released)
—	MF	GUI	Amadou Traoré (on loan to (Lithuania) TransINVEST)
—	MF	LAT	Ivans Patrikejevs (to Super Nova)
—	MF	BRA	Fellipe Vieira (to (Ukraine) Karpaty Lviv)
—	FW	BRA	Dodô (to Grobiņa)
—	FW	SMA	Chovanie Amatkarijo (to (Sweden) Örebro)
—	FW	LAT	Ingars Pūlis (on loan to Ogre United)
—	FW	SEN	Djibril Guèye (to (Lebanon) Jwaya)

=== Daugavpils ===
In: Note: Flags indicate national team as defined under FIFA eligibility rules; some limited exceptions apply. Players may hold more than one non-FIFA nationality.

No.	Pos.	Nation	Player
—	GK	LAT	Vladislavs Razumejevs (loan return from RFS)
—	MF	LAT	Ņikita Barkovskis (loan return from Super Nova)
—	FW	NGR	Zakari Amodu (from (Nigeria) Final Touch FA)
—	FW	NGR	Mus'ab Suleiman (from (Nigeria) Footwork)

Out: Note: Flags indicate national team as defined under FIFA eligibility rules; some limited exceptions apply. Players may hold more than one non-FIFA nationality.

No.	Pos.	Nation	Player
—	MF	UKR	Artem Harzha (to (Czech Republic) FK Teplice)
—	FW	CMR	Rostand Ndjiki (loan return to RFS)
—	FW	CIV	Mamadou Sylla (loan return to RFS)

=== Auda ===
In: Note: Flags indicate national team as defined under FIFA eligibility rules; some limited exceptions apply. Players may hold more than one non-FIFA nationality.

No.	Pos.	Nation	Player
—	DF	LAT	Daniels Balodis (from (Slovakia) Tatran)
—	DF	LAT	Alvis Jaunzems (from (Poland) Lechia)
—	MF	ESP	Brian Peña (from Riga)
—	MF	BFA	Mohamed Fofana (on loan from (United Arab Emirates) United II)
—	FW	GHA	Andrews Appiah (Free agent)
—	FW	BRA	Thauan (from (Brazil) América MG)
—	FW	SEN	Sidy Koumé (from (Spain) Leganés U19)

Out: Note: Flags indicate national team as defined under FIFA eligibility rules; some limited exceptions apply. Players may hold more than one non-FIFA nationality.

No.	Pos.	Nation	Player
—	DF	LAT	Deniss Meļņiks (to (Scotland) Falkirk)
—	DF	CIV	Bakary Diawara (to (France) Châteauroux)
—	FW	PAN	Josué Vergara (to (Belgium) Gent)
—	FW	BFA	Ousmane Camara (to (Belgium) Liège)

=== Jelgava ===
In: Note: Flags indicate national team as defined under FIFA eligibility rules; some limited exceptions apply. Players may hold more than one non-FIFA nationality.

No.	Pos.	Nation	Player
—	DF	CZE	Andriy Yuzvak (loan return from (Poland) Znicz Pruszków)
—	DF	LAT	Kristers Aļekseičiks (loan return from (Czech Republic) Vítkovice)
—	FW	LAT	Kristofers Rēķis (loan return from (Czech Republic) Vítkovice)

Out: Note: Flags indicate national team as defined under FIFA eligibility rules; some limited exceptions apply. Players may hold more than one non-FIFA nationality.

No.	Pos.	Nation	Player
—	DF	CZE	Leoš Prior (to (Czech Republic) Slovácko)
—	DF	CZE	Andriy Yuzvak (to (Czech Republic) Silon Táborsko)
—	MF	CZE	David Holoubek (Released)

=== Tukums 2000 ===
In: Note: Flags indicate national team as defined under FIFA eligibility rules; some limited exceptions apply. Players may hold more than one non-FIFA nationality.

No.	Pos.	Nation	Player
—	GK	LAT	Sergejs Vilkovs (from RFS)
—	GK	LAT	Alekss Kuprins (from RFS II)
—	MF	JPN	Koyo Shigema (from (Japan) Ryukyu)
—	FW	LAT	Daniels Radzenieks (from (Ukraine) Polissya U19)
—	FW	LAT	Emīls Sprukts (from Ogre United)

Out: Note: Flags indicate national team as defined under FIFA eligibility rules; some limited exceptions apply. Players may hold more than one non-FIFA nationality.

No.	Pos.	Nation	Player
—	GK	LAT	Ivans Baturins (Released)
—	MF	LAT	Daniils Putrāns (to Riga II)
—	MF	LAT	Renē Baumanis (to Leevon PPK)
—	MF	LAT	Raivis Ķiršs (to Super Nova)
—	MF	JPN	Yushin Koki (loan return to (Japan) Ryukyu)
—	FW	NGR	Joseph Oloko Ede (loan return to Liepāja)
—	FW	LAT	Niks Dusalijevs (to RFS, previously on loan)

=== Super Nova ===
In: Note: Flags indicate national team as defined under FIFA eligibility rules; some limited exceptions apply. Players may hold more than one non-FIFA nationality.

No.	Pos.	Nation	Player
—	MF	LAT	Raivis Ķiršs (from Tukums 2000)
—	MF	LAT	Ivans Patrikejevs (from Liepāja)

Out: Note: Flags indicate national team as defined under FIFA eligibility rules; some limited exceptions apply. Players may hold more than one non-FIFA nationality.

No.	Pos.	Nation	Player
—	GK	LAT	Sergejs Vilkovs (loan return to RFS)
—	DF	LAT	Kristaps Maksimovs (to Alberts)
—	DF	LAT	Valters Purs (Released)
—	MF	LAT	Ņikita Barkovskis (loan return to Daugavpils)
—	MF	ARG	Facundo García (loan return to RFS)
—	MF	CIV	Ge Ismael Nicaise Sylla (to (Czech Republic) SK Artis Brno)
—	MF	SEN	Sabaly Diallo (loan return to (France) Le Havre B)
—	FW	JPN	Sho Aogaki (to Leevon PPK)

=== Grobiņa ===
In: Note: Flags indicate national team as defined under FIFA eligibility rules; some limited exceptions apply. Players may hold more than one non-FIFA nationality.

No.	Pos.	Nation	Player
—	GK	LAT	Roberts Ozols (from (Albania) Bylis)
—	DF	SRB	Aleksa Jovanović (from (Serbia) Dubočica)
—	MF	BEL	Milan Corryn (from (Belgium) Crossing Schaerbeek)
—	MF	LAT	Artūrs Zjuzins (from (Norway) Nybergsund)
—	MF	UKR	Anton Baydal (from (Ukraine) Vorskla)
—	MF	UKR	Ivan Tyshchenko (on loan from (Ukraine) Bukovyna)
—	FW	BRA	Dodô (from Liepāja)

Out: Note: Flags indicate national team as defined under FIFA eligibility rules; some limited exceptions apply. Players may hold more than one non-FIFA nationality.

No.	Pos.	Nation	Player
—	GK	LAT	Ņikita Pinčuks (to (Germany) Rot Weiss Ahlen)
—	GK	LAT	Toms Laizāns (to Karosta)
—	DF	LAT	Aleksandrs Molotkovs (loan return to Liepāja, later loaned to Ogre United)
—	MF	LAT	Ralfs Bethers (to Liepāja II)
—	MF	LAT	Maksims Fjodorovs (to Leevon PPK)
—	FW	LAT	Rodrigo Gaučis (to Dienvidkurzeme)

=== Ogre United ===
In: Note: Flags indicate national team as defined under FIFA eligibility rules; some limited exceptions apply. Players may hold more than one non-FIFA nationality.

No.	Pos.	Nation	Player
—	DF	LAT	Aleksandrs Molotkovs (on loan from Liepāja)
—	DF	LAT	Jānis Grīnbergs (from Liepāja)
—	DF	LAT	Aleksejs Kudeļkins (from (Romania) Metalul)
—	DF	LAT	Rendijs Šibass (from Metta)
—	MF	GER	Leif Estevez (from (Lithuania) Riteriai)
—	MF	UKR	Arsentiy Doroshenko (from (Ukraine) Poltava)
—	FW	UKR	Artem Marchuk (from (Lithuania) Džiugas)
—	FW	LAT	Ingars Pūlis (on loan from Liepāja)
—	FW	FRA	Jacques Fokam (on loan from (Czech Republic) Dukla)

Out: Note: Flags indicate national team as defined under FIFA eligibility rules; some limited exceptions apply. Players may hold more than one non-FIFA nationality.

No.	Pos.	Nation	Player
—	DF	JPN	Kaito Kumakura (Released)
—	DF	JPN	Koki Hayashi (to (Romania) Metalul)
—	FW	LAT	Haralds Silagailis (to (Finland) SJK Akatemia)
—	FW	LAT	Emīls Sprukts (to Tukums 2000)

== Latvian First League ==
=== Metta ===
In: Note: Flags indicate national team as defined under FIFA eligibility rules; some limited exceptions apply. Players may hold more than one non-FIFA nationality.

No.	Pos.	Nation	Player

Out: Note: Flags indicate national team as defined under FIFA eligibility rules; some limited exceptions apply. Players may hold more than one non-FIFA nationality.

No.	Pos.	Nation	Player
—	DF	LAT	Rendijs Šibass (to Ogre United)
—	MF	LAT	Henrijs Gulbis (to (United States) Northeast Hawks)

=== Alberts ===
In: Note: Flags indicate national team as defined under FIFA eligibility rules; some limited exceptions apply. Players may hold more than one non-FIFA nationality.

No.	Pos.	Nation	Player
—	GK	LAT	Rūdolfs Zandreiters (from Mārupe)
—	GK	LAT	Kristaps Jautaiķis (loan return from (Italy) Paganese)
—	DF	LAT	Kristaps Maksimovs (from Super Nova)
—	DF	LAT	Leonīds Šindlers (from Riga II)
—	DF	LAT	Ņikita Martiņenko (from (Italy) Gela)
—	MF	LAT	Rauls Ozoliņš (from Riga II)
—	MF	LAT	Gatis Belickis (Free agent)
—	FW	LAT	Kristiāns Priedītis (from (United States) Excelsior New York)

Out: Note: Flags indicate national team as defined under FIFA eligibility rules; some limited exceptions apply. Players may hold more than one non-FIFA nationality.

No.	Pos.	Nation	Player
—	GK	LAT	Kristaps Jautaiķis (on loan to (Italy) Paganese)
—	FW	NGR	Michael Akpan (to Salaspils)
—	FW	LAT	Markus Prohorenkovs (to Salaspils)

=== Riga Mariners ===
In: Note: Flags indicate national team as defined under FIFA eligibility rules; some limited exceptions apply. Players may hold more than one non-FIFA nationality.

No.	Pos.	Nation	Player
—	DF	LAT	Ņikita Cepeļevs (from Valmiera)
—	DF	LAT	Matīss Siliņš (from (Croatia) Sesvete U19)
—	MF	LAT	Enriko Gauračs (from Riga II)
—	MF	LAT	Martins Raihs (from Dienvidkurzeme)
—	FW	LAT	Hugo Beķeris (from Riga II)
—	FW	LBR	Mateus Kolenda (from (Austria) Kitzbühel)
—	FW	BRA	Lucas Souza (from (Brazil) Rio Branco AC U20)

Out: Note: Flags indicate national team as defined under FIFA eligibility rules; some limited exceptions apply. Players may hold more than one non-FIFA nationality.

No.	Pos.	Nation	Player
—	DF	LAT	Ralfs Muižnieks (Released)
—	DF	LAT	Rainers Tomass Urujevs (to Mārupe)
—	DF	LAT	Aleksandrs Siņeļņikovs (to (Italy) Genoa U17)
—	MF	LAT	Aleksandrs Sebastians Svaričevskis (to Riga II)
—	FW	LAT	Artjoms Zamullo (Released)
—	FW	LAT	Deniss Avdejevs (to Mārupe)

=== JFK Ventspils ===
In: Note: Flags indicate national team as defined under FIFA eligibility rules; some limited exceptions apply. Players may hold more than one non-FIFA nationality.

No.	Pos.	Nation	Player
—	FW	GAM	Mamadou Gingally (on loan from (Slovakia) Nitra B)

Out: Note: Flags indicate national team as defined under FIFA eligibility rules; some limited exceptions apply. Players may hold more than one non-FIFA nationality.

No.	Pos.	Nation	Player
—	FW	LAT	Jegors Poskrjobiševs (to RFS II)

=== RFS-2 ===
In: Note: Flags indicate national team as defined under FIFA eligibility rules; some limited exceptions apply. Players may hold more than one non-FIFA nationality.

No.	Pos.	Nation	Player
—	DF	LAT	Rems Gastons Dzeguze (from Tukums II)
—	FW	LAT	Jegors Poskrjobiševs (from Ventspils)

Out: Note: Flags indicate national team as defined under FIFA eligibility rules; some limited exceptions apply. Players may hold more than one non-FIFA nationality.

No.	Pos.	Nation	Player
—	GK	LAT	Alekss Kuprins (to Tukums 2000)
—	MF	LAT	Mihails Kuliks (to Mārupe)

=== Skanste ===
In: Note: Flags indicate national team as defined under FIFA eligibility rules; some limited exceptions apply. Players may hold more than one non-FIFA nationality.

No.	Pos.	Nation	Player
—	GK	LAT	Toms Lastovskis (from Jules Verne)
—	FW	GHA	Muhammad Hadi (from (Ghana) Sankara National)

Out: Note: Flags indicate national team as defined under FIFA eligibility rules; some limited exceptions apply. Players may hold more than one non-FIFA nationality.

No.	Pos.	Nation	Player
—	MF	LAT	Miķelis Krišjānis Menniks (to (Belgium) Jong Gent)

=== Leevon PPK ===
In: Note: Flags indicate national team as defined under FIFA eligibility rules; some limited exceptions apply. Players may hold more than one non-FIFA nationality.

No.	Pos.	Nation	Player
—	MF	LAT	Renē Baumanis (from Tukums 2000)
—	MF	LAT	Andrejs Kiriļins (from Dinamo)
—	MF	LAT	Rainers Buks (from Rēzekne)
—	MF	LAT	Maksims Fjodorovs (from Grobiņa)
—	FW	JPN	Sho Aogaki (from Super Nova)

Out: Note: Flags indicate national team as defined under FIFA eligibility rules; some limited exceptions apply. Players may hold more than one non-FIFA nationality.

No.	Pos.	Nation	Player
—	GK	LAT	Maikls Rūmanis (to Aliance)
—	DF	LAT	Dominiks Romenskis (to (Czech Republic) Přepeře)

=== Mārupe ===
In: Note: Flags indicate national team as defined under FIFA eligibility rules; some limited exceptions apply. Players may hold more than one non-FIFA nationality.

No.	Pos.	Nation	Player
—	GK	LAT	Norberts Armanovičs (from Sigulda)
—	GK	LAT	Roberts Edvards Veide (from Alberts II)
—	DF	LAT	Rainers Tomass Urujevs (from Riga Mariners)
—	MF	LAT	Mihails Kuliks (from RFS II)
—	MF	NED	Slevin Krom (from (Lithuania) Riteriai)
—	FW	LAT	Artjoms Deņisovs (from (Italy) Roccasecca)
—	FW	LAT	Deniss Avdejevs (from Riga Mariners)
—	FW	JPN	Shogo Osawa (Free agent)

Out: Note: Flags indicate national team as defined under FIFA eligibility rules; some limited exceptions apply. Players may hold more than one non-FIFA nationality.

No.	Pos.	Nation	Player
—	GK	LAT	Rūdolfs Zandreiters (to Alberts)
—	DF	LAT	Pīters Pauls Garais (to (United States) E&H University)
—	MF	LAT	Klāvs Grosbergs (to Cēsis)
—	FW	ARM	Arame Minasyan (to (Spain) Real Murcia C)

=== Rēzekne ===
In: Note: Flags indicate national team as defined under FIFA eligibility rules; some limited exceptions apply. Players may hold more than one non-FIFA nationality.

No.	Pos.	Nation	Player
—	MF	LAT	Artūrs Raudovičs (from Ludza)
—	MF	GHA	Godwin Segla (on loan from (Ghana) Bawaleshie)

Out: Note: Flags indicate national team as defined under FIFA eligibility rules; some limited exceptions apply. Players may hold more than one non-FIFA nationality.

No.	Pos.	Nation	Player
—	MF	LAT	Rainers Buks (to Leevon PPK)

=== Smiltene ===
In: Note: Flags indicate national team as defined under FIFA eligibility rules; some limited exceptions apply. Players may hold more than one non-FIFA nationality.

No.	Pos.	Nation	Player
—	DF	LAT	Bruno Agnis Čākurs (on loan from (United States) Ann Arbor)
—	DF	LAT	Roberts Bleikšs (from (Sweden) Tekniska Högskolan)
—	MF	LBR	Mcalbert Hills (Free agent)
—	MF	CMR	Emile Ngai (from (Cameroon) Isohsa Limbe)

Out: Note: Flags indicate national team as defined under FIFA eligibility rules; some limited exceptions apply. Players may hold more than one non-FIFA nationality.

No.	Pos.	Nation	Player

=== Riga-2 ===
In: Note: Flags indicate national team as defined under FIFA eligibility rules; some limited exceptions apply. Players may hold more than one non-FIFA nationality.

No.	Pos.	Nation	Player
—	MF	LAT	Daniils Putrāns (from Tukums 2000)
—	MF	LAT	Aleksandrs Sebastians Svaričevskis (from Riga Mariners)
—	MF	CIV	Bi Tra (from (United Arab Emirates) United II)
—	MF	POR	Rodrigo Mendes (from (Portugal) Pevidém)
—	FW	LAT	Valters Lūsis (from (Slovenia) Celje U19)

Out: Note: Flags indicate national team as defined under FIFA eligibility rules; some limited exceptions apply. Players may hold more than one non-FIFA nationality.

No.	Pos.	Nation	Player
—	DF	LAT	Leonīds Šindlers (to Alberts)
—	MF	LAT	Enriko Gauračs (to Riga Mariners)
—	MF	LAT	Rauls Ozoliņš (to Alberts)
—	FW	LAT	Hugo Beķeris (to Riga Mariners)

=== Tukums 2000-2 ===
In: Note: Flags indicate national team as defined under FIFA eligibility rules; some limited exceptions apply. Players may hold more than one non-FIFA nationality.

No.	Pos.	Nation	Player
—	GK	LAT	Mārtiņš Veļika (from Jelgava II)

Out: Note: Flags indicate national team as defined under FIFA eligibility rules; some limited exceptions apply. Players may hold more than one non-FIFA nationality.

No.	Pos.	Nation	Player
—	DF	LAT	Rems Gastons Dzeguze (to RFS II)

=== Valmiera ===
In: Note: Flags indicate national team as defined under FIFA eligibility rules; some limited exceptions apply. Players may hold more than one non-FIFA nationality.

No.	Pos.	Nation	Player

Out: Note: Flags indicate national team as defined under FIFA eligibility rules; some limited exceptions apply. Players may hold more than one non-FIFA nationality.

No.	Pos.	Nation	Player
—	DF	LAT	Ņikita Cepeļevs (to Riga Mariners)
—	FW	LAT	Daniils Cepeļevs (Released)

=== Super Nova-2 ===
In: Note: Flags indicate national team as defined under FIFA eligibility rules; some limited exceptions apply. Players may hold more than one non-FIFA nationality.

No.	Pos.	Nation	Player
—	FW	LAT	Armans Muradjans (from (Italy) Darfo Boario)

Out: Note: Flags indicate national team as defined under FIFA eligibility rules; some limited exceptions apply. Players may hold more than one non-FIFA nationality.

No.	Pos.	Nation	Player
