= 2023 Latvian First League =

Latvian First League
- Season: 2023
- Champions: Grobiņas
- Promoted: Grobiņas
- Relegated: Beitar; Dinamo Rīga

The 2023 Latvian First League (referred to as the Optibet Nākotnes Līga for sponsorship reasons) was the 32nd season of second-tier football in Latvia. The season started on 7 April 2023 and finished on 12 November 2023.

The winners (Grobiņas) were promoted to the 2024 Latvian Higher League. The third-placed team (Skanstes SK) qualified for the Latvian Higher League play-off. The twelfth-placed team (Smiltene) qualified for the Latvian First League play-off. Two teams (Beitar and Dinamo Rīga) withdrew from the league and were relegated to the 2024 Latvian Second League.

== Teams ==
=== Team changes ===
Promoted from 2022 Latvian Second League	Promoted to 2023 Latvian Higher League	Relegated to 2023 Latvian Second League
Beitar; Ventspils	Jelgava	Salaspils

=== Stadia and locations ===
Team	Location	Stadium	Capacity
AFA Olaine	Olaine	Olaines pilsētas stadions	
Beitar	Salaspils	Salaspils sporta nama stadions	648
Dinamo Rīga	Riga	RTU stadions	1,000
Grobiņas SC	Grobiņa	Grobiņa Stadium	1,000
JDFS Alberts	Riga	Daugavgrīvas vidusskolas stadions	1,000
Rēzeknes FA/BJSS	Rēzekne	Sporta Aģentūras Stadions	978
RFS 2	Riga	LNK Sporta Parks	740
Riga II	Riga	Skonto Stadium	8,087
FS Leevon	Saldus	Saldus pilsētas stadions	1,000
Skanstes SK	Riga	Hanzas vidusskolas laukums (Skanste)	2,000
Smiltene	Smiltene	Tepera stadions	1,000
Tukums II	Tukums	Tukuma Pilsētas Stadions	
Valmiera 2/VSS	Valmiera	Jānis Daliņš Stadium	2,000
Ventspils	Ventspils	Ventspils Olimpiskais Stadions	3,200

== League table ==
Pos	Team	Pld	W	D	L	GF	GA	GD	Pts	Promotion, qualification or relegation
1	Grobiņas (C, P)	26	21	3	2	71	17	+54	66	Promotion to the Latvian Higher League
2	Riga II (Note: Ineligible for promotion as a reserve team a division below main team.)	26	20	4	2	85	15	+70	64	
3	Skanste	26	19	2	5	58	21	+37	59	Qualification for the Latvian Higher League play-off
4	JDFS Alberts	26	13	8	5	60	36	+24	47	
5	Leevon Saldus	16	12	4	0	40	28	+12	40	
6	RFS 2	26	11	4	11	58	42	+16	37	
7	Beitar (Note: Withdrew from league.) (R)	26	11	2	13	41	66	−25	35	Relegation to the Latvian Second League
8	Tukums II	26	10	3	13	41	54	−13	33	
9	Ventspils	26	8	6	12	24	29	−5	30	
10	Valmiera 2/VSS	26	7	7	12	30	40	−10	28	
11	AFA Olaine	26	5	8	13	36	61	−25	23	
12	Smiltene (O)	26	6	4	16	31	67	−36	22	Qualification for the Latvian First League play-off
13	Dinamo Rīga (Note: Withdrew from league.) (R)	26	5	3	18	27	66	−39	18	Relegation to the Latvian Second League
14	Rēzeknes FA/BJSS (Note: Reprieved from relegation after Beitar's withdrawal from the league.)	26	3	4	19	18	78	−60	13	

Source: Soccerway
Rules for classification: 1) Points; 2) Head-to-head points; 3) Head-to-head goal difference; 4) Goal difference; 5) Goals scored; 6) Fair-play ranking; 7) Play-off. (Note: Head-to-head record is used only after all the matches between the teams in question have been played)
(C) Champions; (O) Play-off winners; (P) Promoted; (R) Relegated

== Latvian First League play-off ==
The twelfth-placed club (Smiltene) faced the third-placed club from the 2023 Latvian Second League (Augšdaugavas) for the final place in the following season's Latvian First League.

=== First leg ===
19 November 2023	Augšdaugavas	3–1	Smiltene	Ilūkste
12:00 BST				Stadium: Ilūkstes pilsētas stadions

=== Second leg ===
25 November 2023	Smiltene	3–0 (4–3 agg.)	Augšdaugavas	Smiltene
12:00 BST				Stadium: Tepera stadions
