= 2024 Latvian First League =

Latvian First League
- Season: 2024
- Champions: Super Nova
- Promoted: Super Nova

The 2024 Latvian First League (referred to as the Optibet Nākotnes Līga for sponsorship reasons) was the 33rd season of second-tier football in Latvia. The season started on 5 April 2024 and finished on 10 November 2024.

The winners (Super Nova) were promoted to the 2025 Latvian Higher League. The third-placed team (JDFS Alberts) qualified for the Latvian Higher League play-off, losing and remaining in the league. The twelfth-placed team (Tukums II) qualified for the Latvian First League play-off, winning and retaining their place in the league. The bottom two teams (Rēzeknes FA/BJSS and Smiltene) were not relegated because of Valmiera FC financial problems.

== Teams ==
=== Team changes ===
Promoted from 2023 Latvian Second League	Promoted to 2024 Latvian Higher League	Relegated from 2023 Latvian Higher League	Relegated to 2024 Latvian Second League
Mārupes; Ogre United	Grobiņas	Super Nova	Beitar; Dinamo Rīga

- FS Leevon Saldus merged with Latvian Second League team FK PPK before the season started to form Leevon PPK, retaining the FS Leevon name for the Saldus-based youth academy.

== League table ==
Pos	Team	Pld	W	D	L	GF	GA	GD	Pts	Promotion, qualification or relegation
1	Super Nova (C, P)	26	21	2	3	65	11	+54	65	Promotion to the Latvian Higher League
2	RFS II	26	20	3	3	71	18	+53	63	Ineligible for promotion as a reserve side a division below main team
3	JDFS Alberts	26	19	1	6	53	21	+32	58	Qualification for the Latvian Higher League play-off
4	Riga II	26	13	9	4	59	26	+33	48	
5	Skanstes	26	12	5	9	39	28	+11	41	
6	Valmiera II	26	10	4	12	41	39	+2	34	
7	Mārupes	26	9	6	11	25	44	−19	33	
8	Leevon PPK	26	9	4	13	36	38	−2	31	
9	Olaine	26	8	6	12	45	50	−5	30	
10	Ventspils	26	8	6	12	32	37	−5	30	
11	Ogre United	26	7	8	11	37	44	−7	29	
12	Tukums II (O)	26	5	4	17	25	68	−43	19	Qualification for the Latvian First League play-off
13	Smiltene (R)	26	4	5	17	24	62	−38	17	Relegation to the Latvian Second League
14	Rēzeknes FA/BJSS (R)	26	3	5	18	18	84	−66	14	Relegation to the Latvian Second League

Source: Soccerway
Rules for classification: 1) Points; 2) Head-to-head points; 3) Head-to-head goal difference; 4) Goal difference; 5) Goals scored; 6) Fair-play ranking; 7) Play-off. (Note: Head-to-head record is used only after all the matches between the teams in question have been played)
(C) Champions; (O) Play-off winners; (P) Promoted; (R) Relegated

== Results ==
Home \ Away	ALB	LEE	MĀR	OGR	OLA	RFS	RIG	RĒZ	SKA	SMI	SUP	TUK	VAL	VEN
JDFS Alberts		1–0	1–0	3–1	2–0	3–0	2–0	3–0	0–1	3–0	0–2	4–1	3–2	2–0
Leevon PPK	0–2		4–2	1–1	2–1	1–2	1–4	4–1	2–0	2–2	0–1	2–2	2–1	0–1
Mārupes	0–1	1–0		3–2	2–1	1–2	0–0	1–1	0–0	0–0	0–2	2–1	2–1	1–0
Ogre United	0–3	0–1	3–0		1–1	1–2	2–2	5–2	1–1	2–2	1–1	1–0	4–0	3–2
Olaine	3–2	3–1	5–1	3–3		1–3	1–4	5–0	1–0	1–1	1–4	2–2	0–0	2–0
RFS II	4–0	1–0	3–1	5–0	3–1		3–0	4–0	5–1	7–0	0–2	6–0	2–0	5–2
Riga II	2–2	2–1	2–1	0–0	4–0	1–1		6–0	0–0	5–1	0–1	9–0	2–1	0–0
Rēzeknes FA/BJSS	0–7	0–7	1–1	1–4	1–2	0–2	1–2		1–0	0–4	0–3	2–1	1–0	2–2
Skanstes	0–1	3–0	1–1	1–0	3–2	0–5	0–1	6–0		0–3	0–0	7–0	1–0	3–0
Smiltene	1–2	0–2	0–1	0–2	0–4	0–3	0–3	3–3	0–3		0–4	0–2	2–4	0–2
Super Nova	1–0	3–0	7–0	3–0	4–1	1–0	5–0	5–0	1–0	2–3		2–0	4–1	2–1
Tukums II	1–4	0–2	0–1	2–0	2–0	1–2	0–7	1–1	1–3	1–2	0–4		4–1	1–1
Valmiera II	2–0	0–0	4–0	3–0	3–2	1–1	2–2	2–0	2–3	2–0	2–1	3–1		1–2
Ventspils	0–2	4–1	2–3	2–0	2–2	0–0	1–1	4–0	1–2	2–0	1–0	0–1	0–3	

Source: LPF (in Romanian)
Legend: Blue = home team win; Yellow = draw; Red = away team win.

== Latvian First League play-off ==
The twelfth-placed club (Tukums II) faced the fifth-placed club from the 2024 Latvian Second League (Salaspils) in a two-legged play-off for the final place in the following season's Latvian First League.

=== First leg ===
13 November 2024	Salaspils	0–11	Tukums II	Salaspils
18:00 BST				Stadium: Salaspils stadions

=== Second leg ===
16 November 2024	Tukums II	6–0 (17–0 agg.)	Salaspils	Tukums
12:00 BST				Stadium: Tukuma Pilsētas Stadions
