= 2019 Latvian First League =

Latvian football league season for 2nd division

Pirmā līga
- Season: 2019

The 2019 Latvian First League (referred to as the Pirmā līga) was played with 10 teams meeting each other three times.

== League table ==
=== Table ===
Pos	Team	Pld	W	D	L	GF	GA	GD	Pts	Qualification or relegation
1	FK Tukums 2000/TSS	27	24	2	1	112	14	+98	74	Promoted to 2020 Virsliga
2	SK Super Nova	27	19	1	7	95	27	+68	58	Promotion playoffs
3	FK Smiltene/BJSS	27	17	2	8	78	52	+26	53	
4	JDFS Alberts	27	16	3	8	70	47	+23	51	
5	FK Auda	27	14	3	10	62	51	+11	45	
6	Rēzeknes FA/BJSS	27	13	4	10	76	56	+20	43	
7	Grobiņas SC	29	10	2	17	56	104	−48	32	
8	FC New Project	27	6	2	19	35	62	−27	20	Relegation to 2020 Second League
9	Dinamo Rīga/Staicele	27	6	1	20	39	78	−39	19	Relegation to 2020 Second League
10	Balvu Sporta centrs	27	1	0	26	23	151	−128	3	Relegation to 2020 Second League

Updated to match(es) played on unknown. Source: RSSSF
Rules for classification: 1) points; 2) goal difference; 3) number of goals scored.

=== Playoffs ===
SK Super Nova were not promoted.
