= 2023 Latvian Second League =

Latvian Second League
- Season: 2023
- Champions: Mārupe
- Promoted: Mārupe; Ogre United
- Relegated: Liepāja-2; Limbaži; Staiceles Bebri

The 2023 Latvian Second League (referred to as the Altero.LV LIIGA for sponsorship reasons) was the 32nd season of third-tier football in Latvia. The season started on 15 April 2023 and finished on 21 October 2023.

The champions (Mārupe) and runners-up (Ogre United) were promoted to the 2024 Latvian First League. The third-placed team (Augšdaugavas) qualified for the Latvian First League play-off against the twelfth-placed team from the 2023 Latvian First League. The bottom three teams (Liepāja-2, Limbaži, and Staiceles Bebri) were relegated to the 2024 Latvian Third League.

== Teams ==
The league consisted of sixteen teams; ten remaining from the previous season, five promoted from the Latvian Third League, and one relegated from the Latvian First League.

The teams were originally split into two groups (East and West), and play each other twice (once at home and once away). The top four teams in each group qualify for Group A, while the bottom four teams in each group qualify for Group B.

=== Team changes ===
Promoted from 2022 Latvian Third League	Promoted to 2023 Latvian First League	Relegated from 2022 Latvian First League	Relegated to 2023 Latvian Third League	Withdrew from league
Augšdaugavas NSS; Jelgava-2; JDFS Alberts-2; Ogre United; PPK/Betsafe	FK Beitar; Ventspils	Salaspils	Babīte; Jūrnieks; Preiļu	Priekuļi

=== Stadia and locations ===
==== East ====
Team	Location
Augšdaugavas NSS	Ilūkste
FC Gauja	Gauja
Jēkabpils/JSC	Jēkabpils
FK Kalupe	Kalupe
FK Limbaži	Limbaži
FK Ogre United	Ogre
Salaspils	Salaspils
Staiceles Bebri	Staicele

==== West ====
Team	Location
FK Aliance	Riga
JDFS Alberts-2	Riga
Jelgava-2	Jelgava
FK Karosta	Liepāja
FK Ķekava/Auda	Ķekava
Liepāja-2	Liepāja
Mārupes SC	Mārupe
FK PPK/Betsafe	Riga

== League tables ==
=== East ===
Pos	Team	Pld	W	D	L	GF	GA	GD	Pts	Qualification
1	Ogre United	14	9	1	4	47	12	+35	28	Qualification for Group A
2	Augšdaugavas	14	9	1	4	33	18	+15	28	Qualification for Group A
3	Kalupe	14	8	1	5	41	18	+23	25	Qualification for Group A
4	Jēkabpils/JSC	14	7	1	6	37	28	+9	22	Qualification for Group A
5	Staiceles Bebri	14	6	2	6	25	25	0	20	Qualification for Group B
6	Salaspils	14	5	2	7	24	52	−28	17	Qualification for Group B
7	Gauja	14	4	2	8	27	54	−27	14	Qualification for Group B
8	Limbaži	14	3	0	11	22	49	−27	9	Qualification for Group B

Source: LFF
Rules for classification: 1) Points; 2) Head-to-head points; 3) Head-to-head goal difference; 4) Goal difference; 5) Goals scored; 6) Fair-play ranking; 7) Play-off. (Note: Head-to-head record is used only after all the matches between the teams in question have been played)

=== West ===
Pos	Team	Pld	W	D	L	GF	GA	GD	Pts	Qualification
1	Mārupe	14	11	1	2	55	13	+42	34	Qualification for Group A
2	Jelgava-2	14	10	1	3	42	23	+19	31	Qualification for Group A
3	PPK/Betsafe	14	8	1	5	38	25	+13	25	Qualification for Group A
4	JDFS Alberts-2	14	7	1	6	29	36	−7	22	Qualification for Group A
5	Alliance	14	5	2	7	29	39	−10	17	Qualification for Group B
6	Karosta	14	4	3	7	19	30	−11	15	Qualification for Group B
7	Liepāja-2	14	3	2	9	18	47	−29	11	Qualification for Group B
8	Ķekava/Auda	14	2	1	11	20	37	−17	7	Qualification for Group B

Source: LFF
Rules for classification: 1) Points; 2) Head-to-head points; 3) Head-to-head goal difference; 4) Goal difference; 5) Goals scored; 6) Fair-play ranking; 7) Play-off. (Note: Head-to-head record is used only after all the matches between the teams in question have been played)

=== Group A ===
Pos	Team	Pld	W	D	L	GF	GA	GD	Pts	Promotion or qualification
1	Mārupe (C, P)	14	11	2	1	42	11	+31	35	Promotion to Latvian First League
2	Ogre United (P)	14	7	2	5	25	23	+2	23	Promotion to Latvian First League
3	Augšdaugavas	14	6	3	5	16	17	−1	21	Qualification for Latvian First League play-off
4	PPK/Betsafe	14	6	1	7	33	25	+8	19	
5	Jelgava-2	14	5	3	6	30	26	+4	18	
6	Jēkabpils/JSC	14	5	1	8	21	38	−17	16	
7	JDFS Alberts-2	14	4	3	7	22	34	−12	15	
8	Kalupe	14	4	1	9	18	34	−16	13	

Source: LFF
Rules for classification: 1) Points; 2) Head-to-head points; 3) Head-to-head goal difference; 4) Goal difference; 5) Goals scored; 6) Fair-play ranking; 7) Play-off. (Note: Head-to-head record is used only after all the matches between the teams in question have been played)
(C) Champions; (P) Promoted

=== Group B ===
Pos	Team	Pld	W	D	L	GF	GA	GD	Pts	Relegation
1	Salaspils	14	9	2	3	44	29	+15	29	
2	Karosta	14	8	3	3	34	24	+10	27	
3	Alliance	14	6	6	2	41	30	+11	24	
4	Gauja	14	6	3	5	41	36	+5	21	
5	Ķekava/Auda	14	6	2	6	43	28	+15	20	
6	Staiceles Bebri (R)	14	6	2	6	34	27	+7	20	Relegation to Latvian Third League
7	Liepāja-2 (R)	14	2	2	10	16	41	−25	8	Relegation to Latvian Third League
8	Limbaži (R)	14	2	2	10	21	59	−38	8	Relegation to Latvian Third League

Source: LFF
Rules for classification: 1) Points; 2) Head-to-head points; 3) Head-to-head goal difference; 4) Goal difference; 5) Goals scored; 6) Fair-play ranking; 7) Play-off. (Note: Head-to-head record is used only after all the matches between the teams in question have been played)
(R) Relegated

== Results ==
=== East ===
Each team plays every other team twice (once at home and once away).

Home \ Away	AUG	GAU	JÉK	KAL	LIM	OGR	SAL	STA
Augšdaugavas	—	4–1	2–0	1–0	4–0	0–1	7–2	3–0
Gauja	3–1	—	3–3	0–3	3–1	2–5	1–2	3–2
Jēkabpils/JSC	1–3	7–1	—	3–0 (Note: Originally a 0–7 win for Kalupe; later overturned to a 3–0 win for Jēkabpils/JSC.)	3–1	3–1	1–2	1–2
Kalupe	2–0	9–1	6–0	—	5–1	2–1	0–3 (Note: Originally a 2–1 win for Kalupe; later overturned to a 0–3 win for Salaspils.)	0–3 (Note: Originally a 8–0 win for Kalupe; later overturned to a 0–3 win for Staiceles Bebri.)
Limbaži	1–3	1–4	4–6	3–2	—	0–5	3–0	3–1
Ogre United	5–0	10–0	0–1	0–4	4–0	—	8–0	3–0
Salaspils	2–3	3–3	0–7	0–8	5–4	0–0	—	4–1
Staiceles Bebri	0–0	3–2	3–1	0–0	4–0	0–4	6–1	—

Source: LFF
Legend: Blue = home team win; Yellow = draw; Red = away team win.
For upcoming matches, an "a" indicates there is an article about the rivalry between the two participants.

=== West ===
Each team plays every other team twice (once at home and once away).

Home \ Away	ALL	JDF	JEL	KAR	ĶEK	LIE	MÁR	PPK
Alliance	—	3–1	1–3	2–2	5–2	3–2	2–2	2–5
JDFS Alberts-2	2–1	—	2–4	2–1	3–2	6–1	0–9	2–1
Jelgava-2	3–1	1–1	—	3–1	3–2	4–0	0–2	4–2
Karosta	0–3	5–2	1–3	—	1–1	2–1	0–3	3–1
Ķekava/Auda	3–2	1–5	2–4	0–1	—	1–3	0–2	1–3
Liepāja-2	2–3	1–3	0–9	0–0	0–4	—	1–0	2–2
Mārupe	7–0	2–0	5–1	4–2	3–0	9–3	—	6–1
PPK/Betsafe	5–1	4–0	3–0	5–0	2–1	1–2	3–1	—

Source: LFF
Legend: Blue = home team win; Yellow = draw; Red = away team win.
For upcoming matches, an "a" indicates there is an article about the rivalry between the two participants.

=== Group A ===
Each team plays every team not played in the first half of the season twice (once at home and once away), with the results against the three remaining teams being carried over from the first half of the season.

Home \ Away	AUG	JDF	JÉK	JEL	KAL	MÁR	OGR	PPK
Augšdaugavas	—	0–0	—	1–1	—	0–1	—	1–0
JDFS Alberts-2	3–4	—	2–1	—	3–0 (Note: Originally a 3–5 win for Kalupe; later overturned to a 3–0 win for JDFS Alberts-2.)	—	2–3	—
Jēkabpils/JSC	—	1–1	—	3–2	—	0–1	—	4–3
Jelgava-2	0–1	—	7–2	—	5–1	—	1–1	—
Kalupe	—	0–3 (Note: Originally a 4–1 win for Kalupe; later overturned to a 0–3 win for JDFS Alberts-2.)	—	0–3 (Note: Originally a 4–0 win for Kalupe; later overturned to a 0–3 win for Jelgava-2.)	—	3–3	—	0–3 (Note: Originally a 3–1 win for Kalupe; later overturned to a 0–3 win for PPK/Betsafe.)
Mārupe	1–0	—	4–1	—	3–0	—	1–1	—
Ogre United	—	4–3	—	2–1	—	1–3	—	3–1
PPK/Betsafe	1–1	—	6–1	—	4–0	—	1–2	—

Source: LFF
Legend: Blue = home team win; Yellow = draw; Red = away team win.
For upcoming matches, an "a" indicates there is an article about the rivalry between the two participants.

=== Group B ===
Each team plays every team not played in the first half of the season twice (once at home and once away), with the results against the three remaining teams being carried over from the first half of the season.

Home \ Away	ALL	GAU	KAR	ĶEK	LIE	LIM	SAL	STA
Alliance	—	3–3	—	—	—	5–1	4–5	1–1
Gauja	4–4	—	1–4	3–2	9–1	—	—	—
Karosta	—	4–1	—	—	—	8–4	3–2	2–3
Ķekava/Auda	—	4–0	—	—	—	17–0	0–3	2–1
Liepāja-2	—	2–4	—	—	—	2–0	2–5	1–3
Limbaži	2–2	—	2–5	0–3	0–0	—	—	—
Salaspils	1–1	—	3–0	6–1	4–0	—	—	—
Staiceles Bebri	2–3	—	1–2	3–3	3–0	—	—	—

Source: LFF
Legend: Blue = home team win; Yellow = draw; Red = away team win.
For upcoming matches, an "a" indicates there is an article about the rivalry between the two participants.
