= 2025 Latvian Higher League =

Latvian Higher League
- Season: 2025
- Dates: 5 March 2025 – 9 November 2025
- Champions: Riga (4th title)
- Relegated: Metta
- Champions League: Riga
- Conference League: RFS; Liepāja; Auda
- Matches: 180
- Goals: 534 (2.97 per match)
- Top goalscorer: Darko Lemajić (28 goals)
- Biggest home win: RFS 6–0 Grobiņa (31 May 2025); Riga 6–0 Auda (13 September 2025)
- Biggest away win: Daugavpils 1–7 RFS (30 June 2025)
- Highest scoring: Daugavpils 1–7 RFS (30 June 2025); RFS 6–2 Tukums 2000 (26 July 2025); Riga 2–6 Super Nova (30 August 2025)
- Longest winning run: 15 matches Riga
- Longest unbeaten run: 31 matches Riga
- Longest winless run: 16 matches Metta
- Longest losing run: 4 matches Auda; Jelgava; Tukums 2000; Super Nova; Grobiņa; Metta
- Highest attendance: 5,062; Riga 3–1 RFS (18 June 2025)
- Lowest attendance: 76; Liepāja 2–2 Jelgava (25 October 2025)
- Total attendance: 78,892
- Average attendance: 438

The 2025 Latvian Higher League, known as the TonyBet Virslīga for sponsorship reasons, was the 34th season of top-tier football in Latvia. The season began on 5 March 2025 and ended in November 2025 (not including play-off matches).

== Teams ==
Locations of the 2025 Latvian Higher League teams
Locations of the 2025 teams from Riga

The league consisted of ten teams; the top nine clubs from the previous season, and one team promoted from the Latvian First League. RFS entered the season as defending champions (for the second consecutive season).

The promoted team was 2024 Latvian First League champions Super Nova (returning to the top flight after a single-season absence). They replaced the 2024 Latvian Higher League fourth-placed team Valmiera, who were disqualified from the last campaign and left the division after seven seasons in the top flight due to being refused a Latvian Higher League license.

2025 Virslīga competitors

Club	Seasons in Virsliga	2024 position	Stadium	Capacity
Auda	7th	3rd	Skonto Stadium	6,747
Daugavpils	10th	5th	Esplanādes stadions	575
Grobiņa	2nd	9th	Daugava Stadium (Liepāja)	4,022
FS Jelgava	3rd	10th	Zemgale Olympic Center	1,560
Liepāja	12th	6th	Daugava Stadium (Liepāja)	4,022
Metta	14th	7th	Sloka Stadium	2,500
RFS	10th	1st	LNK Sporta Parks	1,700
Riga	10th	2nd	Skonto Stadium	6,747
Super Nova	3rd	1st in Latvian First League	Jānis Skredelis' Stadium	396
Tukums 2000	5th	8th	Tukuma Pilsētas Stadions	425

=== Personnel ===
Note: Flags indicate national team as has been defined under FIFA eligibility rules. Players and Managers may hold more than one non-FIFA nationality.

Team	Head coach	Captain			
Team	Head coach	Captain	Auda	(Latvia) Jurģis Kalns	(France) Kemehlo Nguena
Daugavpils	(Latvia) Kirils Kurbatovs	(Latvia) Edgars Ivanovs			
Grobiņa	(Latvia) Viktors Dobrecovs	(Latvia) Dāvids Družiņins			
Jelgava	(Latvia) Aleksandrs Basovs	(Latvia) Armands Pētersons			
Liepāja	(Sweden) Andreas Alm	(Montenegro) Danijel Petković			
Metta	(Latvia) Andris Riherts	(Latvia) Kārlis Vilnis			
RFS	(Latvia) Viktors Morozs	(Slovenia) Žiga Lipušček			
Riga	(Slovakia) Adrián Guľa	(Latvia) Antonijs Černomordijs			
Super Nova	(Latvia) Ervīns Pērkons	(Latvia) Dāvis Vējkrīgers			
Tukums 2000	(Latvia) Kristaps Dišlers	(Latvia) Bogdans Samoilovs			

=== Managerial changes ===
Team	Outgoing manager	Manner of departure	Date of vacancy	Table	Incoming manager	Date of appointment
Liepāja	(Georgia (country)) Tamaz Pertia	Sacked	7 January 2025	Pre-season	(Croatia) Dino Skender	7 January 2025
Auda	(Slovenia) Zoran Zeljković	Sacked	7 January 2025	Pre-season	(Georgia (country)) Aleksandre Rekhviashvili (interim)	8 January 2025
Riga	(Latvia) Mareks Zuntners (interim)	End of interim spell	14 January 2025	Pre-season	(Slovakia) Adrián Guľa	14 January 2025
Auda	(Georgia (country)) Aleksandre Rekhviashvili (interim)	End of interim spell	9 February 2025	Pre-season	(Latvia) Jurģis Kalns	9 February 2025
Liepāja	(Croatia) Dino Skender	Sacked	6 April 2025	5th	(Latvia) Jānis Goba (interim)	6 April 2025

== League table ==
Pos	Team	Pld	W	D	L	GF	GA	GD	Pts	Qualification or relegation
1	Riga (C)	36	27	7	2	85	26	+59	88	Qualification for the Champions League first qualifying round
2	RFS	36	28	3	5	100	39	+61	87	Qualification for the Conference League first qualifying round
3	Liepāja	36	18	7	11	59	55	+4	61	Qualification for the Conference League first qualifying round
4	Daugavpils	36	13	9	14	52	62	−10	48	
5	Auda	36	13	6	17	44	49	−5	45	Qualification for the Conference League second qualifying round (Note: The 2025 Latvian Football Cup winners (Auda) qualify for the Conference League second qualifying round.)
6	Jelgava	36	8	14	14	39	46	−7	38	
7	Tukums 2000	36	9	9	18	39	63	−24	36	
8	Super Nova	36	6	14	16	44	56	−12	32	
9	Grobiņa (O)	36	8	8	20	33	64	−31	32	Qualification for the Latvian Higher League play-off
10	Metta (R)	36	8	7	21	39	74	−35	31	Relegation to Latvian First League

Source: LFF, Soccerway
Rules for classification: 1) Points; 2) Head-to-head points; 3) Head-to-head goal difference; 4) Head-to-head goals scored; 5) Goal difference; 6) Goals scored; 7) Play-off.
(C) Champions; (O) Play-off winners; (R) Relegated

== Results ==
Teams play each other four times (twice at home and twice away).

Home \ Away	AUD	DAU	GRO	JEL	LIE	MLU	RFS	RIG	SNO	TUK	AUD	DAU	GRO	JEL	LIE	MLU	RFS	RIG	SNO	TUK
Auda		1–1	2–0	2–0	3–0	4–1	1–2	1–3	1–0	2–0		1–3	1–0	2–0	1–2	0–1	0–1	1–3	3–2	0–1
Daugavpils	2–1		3–2	1–0	4–2	2–0	1–2	0–1	1–1	3–0	1–0		3–2	2–0	1–2	4–2	1–7	0–1	2–2	1–2
Grobiņa	1–2	3–2		1–1	2–0	2–4	1–4	0–2	1–1	2–0	2–2	1–0		3–2	0–1	0–1	2–3	1–1	0–0	1–0
Jelgava	3–1	4–1	1–0		0–1	2–1	2–2	1–1	2–1	2–1	1–1	0–0	0–1		1–2	2–2	0–1	2–3	1–0	1–1
Liepāja	0–0	1–1	4–1	1–0		4–0	2–1	2–5	2–2	0–0	2–0	2–1	2–0	2–2		1–0	2–2	2–3	0–3	4–1
Metta	0–1	2–2	1–1	0–0	2–3		1–0	0–3	0–2	3–2	3–2	3–1	0–1	2–2	1–2		0–4	0–1	2–1	0–3
RFS	1–0	5–1	6–0	1–0	4–1	2–0		0–1	2–1	2–0	1–0	5–1	5–0	1–4	2–1	5–1		0–0	4–1	6–2
Riga	2–2	1–2	3–0	2–0	2–0	1–1	3–1		2–0	3–0	6–0	1–1	2–0	3–0	3–0	3–2	3–4		2–0	0–0
Super Nova	1–1	4–1	1–1	0–0	1–3	4–0	1–2	1–5		1–1	0–1	1–1	0–0	1–1	3–0	1–1	1–3	2–6		1–0
Tukums 2000	2–4	0–0	2–0	1–1	2–2	2–0	2–5	0–3	2–2		1–0	0–1	2–1	1–1	1–3	3–2	2–4	0–1	2–1	

Source: LFF
Legend: Blue = home team win; Yellow = draw; Red = away team win.

== Latvian Higher League play-off ==
The ninth-placed team (Grobiņa) will face the second-placed team of the 2025 Latvian First League (JDFS Alberts) in a two-legged play-off for the final place in the 2026 Latvian Higher League.

=== First leg ===
20 November 2025	Grobiņa	0–0	JDFS Alberts	Liepāja
18:00		Report		Stadium: Stadions "Daugava", rezerves laukums Attendance: 147; Referee: Aleksejs Griščenko

=== Second leg ===
23 November 2025	JDFS Alberts	0–1	Grobiņa	Riga
14:00	(red card) 26' Matvii Marusii; (red card) 62' Matīss Zēģele	Report	(penalty missed) Devids Dobrecovs; 45' Aleksejs Grjaznovs	Stadium: RTU stadions Attendance: 325; Referee: Andris Treimanis

Grobiņa won 1–0 on aggregate

== Statistics ==
=== Top scorers ===
Rank	Player	Club	Goals
1	(Serbia) Darko Lemajić	RFS	28
2	(Senegal) Djibril Guèye	Liepāja	19
2	(Latvia) Jānis Ikaunieks	RFS	19
4	(Latvia) Ingars Pūlis	Tukums 2000	18
5	(Latvia) Marko Regža	Riga	16
6	(Brazil) Reginaldo Ramires	Riga	14
7	(Nigeria) Kingsley Emenike	Jelgava	10
7	(France) Kemelho Nguena	Auda	10
9	(Costa Rica) Anthony Contreras	Riga	9
9	(Senegal) Mor Talla	RFS	9
9	(Serbia) Stefan Panić	RFS	9

=== Hat-tricks ===
Player	For	Against	Result	Date
(Serbia) Darko Lemajić	RFS	Daugavpils	5–1 (H)	9 May 2025
(France) Kemelho Nguena	Auda	Tukums 2000	4–2 (A)	13 June 2025
(Serbia) Darko Lemajić	RFS	Tukums 2000	6–2 (H)	26 July 2025

=== Clean sheets ===
Rank	Player	Club	Clean sheets
1	(Latvia) Krišjānis Zviedris	Riga	20
2	(Montenegro) Danijel Petković	Liepāja	9
3	(Latvia) Jānis Beks	Daugavpils	8
4	(Latvia) Frenks Orols	Grobiņa (4) / Super Nova (3)	7
4	(Latvia) Rihards Matrevics	Auda	7
6	(Latvia) Raivo Stūriņš	Tukums 2000	5
6	(Latvia) Ņikita Parfjonovs	Tukums 2000 (3) / Metta (2)	5
6	(Czech Republic) Adam Dvořák	Jelgava	5
9	(Latvia) Sergejs Vilkovs	RFS	4
9	(Latvia) Ņikita Pinčuks	Grobiņa	4

=== Discipline ===
==== Player ====
- Most yellow cards: 16
  - (Latvia) Kaspars Anmanis (Tukums 2000)
- Most red cards: 2
  - (Cameroon) Karl Wassom (Riga)
  - (Tunisia) Maroine Mihoubi (Tukums 2000)

==== Club ====
- Most red cards: 6
  - Auda
  - Tukums 2000
  - Grobiņa
- Most yellow cards: 107
  - Grobiņa

== Attendances ==
#	Club	Average
1	Rīga	1,173
2	RFS	744
3	Liepāja	461
4	Grobiņa	355
5	Daugavpils	318
6	Auda	291
7	Jelgava	290
8	Super Nova	259
9	Tukums	258
10	Metta	213
