= FK Pļaviņas DM =

Latvian football club

- Ground: Gostiņi Stadium
- Chairman: Pļaviņu Dome
- Manager: Imants Siliņš
- League: Latvian Second League
- 2014: 16th (1. līga, relegated)

FK Pļaviņas DM is a Latvian football club based in Pļaviņas. They are currently playing in the Latvian Second League. They compete in the Latvian Football Cup.

FK Pļavinas DM play their home games at Gostiņi Stadium, their all-time top goal scorer is Rolands Prohorovs.
