= Anton Baydal =

Ukrainian footballer (born 2000)

Personal information
- Full name: Anton Oleksandrovych Baydal
- Date of birth: 8 February 2000 (age 26)
- Place of birth: Mariupol, Ukraine
- Height: 1.82 m (6 ft 0 in)
- Position: Midfielder

Team information
- Current team: Grobiņa
- Number: 80

Youth career
- 201?–2015: Shakhtar Donetsk
- 2016: Azovstal Mariupol
- 2016: Skala Stryi
- 2017–2019: Mariupol

Senior career*
Years	Team	Apps	(Gls)
2019–2021	Mariupol	3	(0)
2021–2023	Mynai	24	(2)
2023–2024	Viktoriya Sumy	25	(2)
2024–2025	Mariupol	17	(0)
2025–2026	Vorskla Poltava	27	(4)
2026–	Grobiņa	9	(0)
- * Club domestic league appearances and goals as of 12 November 2026

Anton Oleksandrovych Baydal (Ukrainian: Антон Олександрович Байдал; born 8 February 2000) is a Ukrainian professional footballer who plays as a midfielder for Grobiņa in the Latvian Higher League.

== Career ==
Baydal is a product mainly of Azovstal Mariupol and Shakhtar Donetsk sportive school systems.

He made his début for Mariupol in the Ukrainian Premier League as a substituted player in the losing match against Shakhtar Donetsk on 25 August 2019.
