= Aleksandre Rekhviashvili =

Georgian footballer

Personal information
- Full name: Aleksandre Rolandis Dze Rekhviashvili
- Date of birth: 6 August 1974 (age 52)
- Place of birth: Tbilisi, Soviet Union
- Height: 1.80 m (5 ft 11 in)
- Position: Defensive midfielder

Senior career*
Years	Team	Apps	(Gls)
1991–1993	Dinamo Tbilisi	35	(0)
1993–1994	Guria Lanchkhuti	32	(7)
1994	Temp Shepetivka	6	(0)
1995–1996	Metalurgi Rustavi	38	(1)
1997–2002	Skonto	110	(9)
2003	Torpedo-Metallurg Moscow	22	(1)
2004–2005	Ventspils	39	(5)
2005	Baku	8	(0)
2006	Jūrmala	8	(0)

International career
1999–2006	Georgia	21	(0)

Managerial career
- 2026: Ogre United
- * Club domestic league appearances and goals

Aleksandre Rekhviashvili (Georgian: ალექსანდრე რეხვიაშვილი; born 6 August 1974) is a Georgian professional football manager, executive and former player who played as a midfielder. He was most recently in charge of Ogre United. He was the sporting director of Dinamo Tbilisi from 2021 to 2022.

He played on the national team and has been capped 21 times since his debut in 1999.

His club career started in Dinamo Tbilisi in 1991. In 1997, he went to Latvian champion team Skonto FC, where he gradually became one of the best defensive midfielders in the Latvian league, being voted the best league player at the end of 2000/01. In 2003, he was bought by Russian team Torpedo-Metallurg, but after one season he returned to Latvia and FK Ventspils.
