= Ogre United =

Latvian football club

- Full name: Ogre United
- Founded: 2022; 4 years ago
- Ground: Ogres Stadions
- Capacity: 1,262
- Directors: Juris Skābardis; Emīls Latkovskis
- Head coach: Aleksandre Rekhviashvili
- League: Latvian Higher League
- 2025: Latvian First League, 1st (promoted)
- Website: https://ogreunited.lv/
Home colours	Away colours

Ogre United is a Latvian professional football club based in Ogre, competing in the Latvian Higher League, the highest tier of Latvian football.

The club was founded in 2022 and began playing in the Latvian Third League. Ogre United won the North region and reached the regional final — losing to JDFS Alberts' reserve team — which secured their promotion to the Latvian Second League. In the 2023 season, the club won the Eastern zone and finished second in the promotion group, securing promotion to the Latvian First League. In their debut season, the team finished 11th. In 2025, Ogre United won the First League and earned promotion to the Higher League for the first time in their history.

== League and Cup history ==
Season	Division (Name)	Pos./Teams	Pl.	W	D	L	GS	GA	P	Latvian Football Cup
2022	4th (3. līga – Northwest region)	1/(5)	8	7	1	0	34	2	22	Round of 128
2022	4th (3. līga – North region)	1/(6)	10	8	2	0	35	6	26	Round of 128
2023	3rd (2. līga – East region)	1/(8)	14	9	1	4	47	12	28	Round of 16
2023	3rd (2. līga – Promotion group)	2/(8)	14	7	2	5	25	23	23	Round of 16
2024	2nd (1. līga)	11/(14)	26	7	8	11	37	44	29	Round of 32
2025	2nd (1. līga)	1/(14)	26	18	4	4	66	20	58	Round of 32

== Current squad ==
As of 5 September 2026

Note: Flags indicate national team as defined under FIFA eligibility rules; some limited exceptions apply. Players may hold more than one non-FIFA nationality.

No.	Pos.	Nation	Player
1	GK	LAT	Nikita Parfjonovs (on loan from Liepāja)
2	DF	LAT	Rudolfs Ziemelis
3	MF	UKR	Tymofiy Marusiy
5	DF	LAT	Rendijs Šibass
6	DF	LAT	Davis Vejkrigers
7	FW	LAT	Ingars Pūlis (on loan from Liepāja)
8	MF	LAT	Tomašs Mickēvičs (on loan from Riga)
9	FW	FRA	Jacques Fokam (on loan from Dukla Prague)
10	MF	LAT	Markuss Kalniņš
11	FW	LAT	Marks Pačepko
13	DF	LAT	Krists Gulbis
14	DF	LAT	Roberts Aditajs
17	MF	UKR	Vadym Mashchenko
18	FW	LAT	Emils Evelons (on loan from Metta)
19	MF	LAT	Kristers Čudars

No.	Pos.	Nation	Player
20	GK	LAT	Janis Biscuhis
21	FW	LAT	Markuss Ivulans (on loan from Liepāja)
22	MF	GER	Leif Estevez
27	DF	LAT	Aleksandrs Molotkovs
28	MF	LAT	Davis Sedols
30	MF	UKR	Arsentiy Doroshenko
32	GK	LAT	Leo Dalbiņš
37	DF	LAT	Martins Lormanis
47	FW	UGA	Johnson Kabagambe (on loan from Riga)
55	DF	LAT	Aleksejs Kudelkins
71	FW	UKR	Artem Marchuk
77	DF	UKR	Matviy Marusiy
91	DF	LAT	Jānis Grīnbergs
99	FW	BRA	Felipe Machado

== Team staff ==
Position	Name
Chairman of the Board	(Latvia) Juris Skābardis (Latvia) Emīls Latkovskis
Head coach	(Georgia (country)) Aleksandre Rekhviashvili
Goalkeeping coach	(Latvia) Dmitrijs Grigorjevs
Doctor	(Latvia) Irina Mihailova (Latvia) Andris Domanskis
Physiotherapist	(Latvia) Miķelis Alsbergs (Latvia) Elīna Zalāne
