= FK Jēkabpils/JSC =

Latvian football club

- Full name: Futbola klubs Jēkabpils/Jēkabpils sporta centrs
- Founded: 2001
- Dissolved: 2024
- Ground: Jēkabpils sporta centra stadions, Jēkabpils, Latvia
- Manager: Mihails Busels
- League: Latvian Second League
- 2023: 6th

FK Jēkabpils/JSC (also Jēkabpils SC) was a Latvian football club based in Jēkabpils, founded in 2001 as FK Namejs Jēkabpils.

== History ==
From 2008 season the club played in the second-highest division of Latvian football (1. līga) and the Latvian Football Cup.

On 14 July 2017, 1. līga teams Jēkabpils and FK Ogre and 2. līga team (FC Raita of Riga) were suspended from their championships for match fixing. Following this, Jēkabpils SC settled in the Second League, reaching 6th place in the 2023 season.

In March 2024, the team announced its dissolution.

== First-team squad ==
As of 24 April 2017.

Note: Flags indicate national team as defined under FIFA eligibility rules; some limited exceptions apply. Players may hold more than one non-FIFA nationality.

No.	Pos.	Nation	Player
1	GK	LAT	Gatis Kilbloks
2	DF	LAT	Vitālijs Lapkovskis
3	DF	LAT	Andrejs Ostvalds
4	DF	LAT	Andrejs Leščovs
5	DF	LAT	Jurijs Halimons
7	MF	LAT	Olegs Peņkovskis
8	MF	LAT	Edmunds Zvaigzne
9	FW	LAT	Aigars Liņģis
10	MF	LAT	Aleksandrs Gospodarjovs
11	FW	LAT	Sergejs Lebedevs
13	MF	LAT	Oskars Zeps

No.	Pos.	Nation	Player
17	MF	UKR	Dmytro Tamylovych
18	MF	LAT	Igors Lapkovskis
19	DF	LAT	Aleksejs Kuplovs-Oginskis
20	FW	LAT	Dmitrijs Kozlovs
21	MF	LAT	Jevģēnijs Simonovs
23	MF	LAT	Intars Stūrāns
31	GK	LAT	Elvijs Višņevskis
45	DF	LAT	Dainis Balis
55	DF	UKR	Andrii Cherevko
70	MF	LAT	Jurijs Morozs
99	MF	BLR	Dzmitry Kuzmin
