= Latvian Second League =

Third level of the Latvian association football leagues

Altero.lv LIIGA
- Founded: 1992
- Country: Latvia
- Number of clubs: 16
- Level on pyramid: 3
- Promotion to: Optibet Nākotnes Līga
- Relegation to: Dali Dali 3.līga
- Domestic cup: Latvian Cup
- Website: Latvian Football Federation
- Current: 2025 AlteroLIIGA

The Latvian Second League (Latvian: 2. līga or Otrā līga), known for sponsorship reasons as Altero.lv LIIGA since 2023, is the third tier of football in Latvia and is organised by the Latvian Football Federation.

== Competition format ==
=== Regional stage ===
There are 20 clubs in the Second League. There are 2 groups - A grupa and B grupa (formerly - West and East regions), with both containing 10 teams which must play home and away games against their regional opponents. From each group, 5 teams advance to the promotion round, whereas the other 5 teams advance to the relegation round. This stage of the league is typically contested from April to August.

=== Promotion/relegation stage ===
The promotion round involves additional matches among the best 10 teams in the league, allowing two of the best teams to be promoted to the First League at the conclusion of the season. Additionally, the third-finishing team contests a two-legged playoff against the third-from-bottom-team in the First League, with the winner of the playoff securing an additional First League berth for the next season. From 2009 to 2017, the winners of the Latvian Second League in odd years also qualified for the UEFA Regions' Cup.

The relegation round, contested by the bottom 5 teams of each of the two divisions, sees the bottom 3 of those total 10 teams relegated to the Third League.

== Past Second League winners ==
Season	Winner	Runner-up	Third place
1992	Vārpa-SCO	Smiltene	
1993	Cerība Preiļi	Lokomotīve	
1994	Konvoja pulks	Dialogs Jelgava	
1995	Vecrīga	Nafta Ventspils	
1996	FK Ozolnieki	FK Ilūkste	FK VAD
1997	Valmiera-2	Auda	Smiltene / Ogre
1998	Zibens Zemessardze	FK Lode	
1999	AS Lode	Robežsardze	
2000	Akora	Viola	
2001	FC Ditton	Auda-Neo	
2002	FK Balvu Vilki	Nafta Ventspils	
2003	Skonto/Juniors	Fortūna Ogre	
2004	Eirobaltija	Saldus/Brocēni	
2005	Miku/UPTK	FK Abuls	
2006	Olimps	FK Ilūkste	Miku/UPTK
2007	FK Spartaks	Jēkabpils SC	FK Gulbene/Rubate
2008	FK Kauguri-PBLC	Preiļu BJSS	FK Viesulis
2009	RFS/Flaminko	FK Ilūkste	ColdGel/Varavīksne
2010	SFK Varavīksne	OSC/FK-33	FK Ilūkste
2011	Rīnūži/Strong	SK Upesciems	FK Ozolnieki
2012	Kuldīgas NSS	FK Jēkabpils/JSC	Kvarcs/Madona
2013	RTU Futbola centrs	JFK Saldus	
2014	FC Caramba	FK Staiceles Bebri	
2015	FC Caramba	FC Nikers	
2016	Grobiņas SC	SK Cēsis	
2017	LDZ Cargo/DFA	Monarhs/Flaminko	
2018	FC Betlanes	FK Krāslava	
2019	LDZ Cargo/DFA	Ghetto FC	
2020	Albatroz SC/FK Jelgava	FK Salaspils	
2021	Skanstes SK	SK Spēks	FK Karosta
2022	FK Beitar	FK Ventspils	FK Karosta
2023	Mārupes SC	Ogre United	Augšdaugavas NSS
2024	SK Super Nova-2	FS Jelgava-2	
2025	Valmiera FC	SK Super Nova-2	FS Jelgava-2
