= BFC Daugavpils =

Association football club in Daugavpils, Latvia

Daugavpils
- Full name: Biedrība Futbola Centrs Daugavpils (Association Football Center Daugavpils)
- Founded: December 11, 2009; 16 years ago (as BFC Daugava)
- Ground: Esplanādes stadions
- Capacity: 700
- Manager: Kirils Kurbatovs
- League: Virslīga
- 2025: Virslīga, 4th of 10
- Website: www.fcdaugavpils.lv
Home colours	Away colours

BFC Daugavpils is a Latvian professional football club that is based in Daugavpils. They play in the Latvian Higher League. The club plays its home matches at the Esplanādes stadions in Daugavpils with a capacity of around 700 people.

== History ==
=== Domestic history ===
Season	League									Latvian Cup	Top goalscorer		Manager
Season	Div.	Pos.	Pl.	W	D	L	GS	GA	P	Latvian Cup	Name	League	Manager
2010	2nd	7th	22	7	3	12	28	35	24	-			
2011	2nd	8th	24	8	5	11	37	57	29	Round of 16			
2012	2nd	4th	26	15	7	4	49	20	52	Quarterfinal			
2013	2nd	1st	30	25	4	1	104	16	79	Quarterfinal			
2014	1st	8th	36	8	5	23	30	65	29	Semifinal	Pavel Ryzhevski	6	
2015	1st	6th	24	2	8	14	14	37	14	Round of 16	Pavel Ryzhevski	5	
2016	1st	8th	28	2	5	21	13	56	11	Semifinal	Pavel Ryzhevski; Syarhey Krot	4	
2017	2nd	3rd	22	15	2	5	58	14	47	Quarterfinal; Fourth round			
2018	2nd	1st	19	16	1	2	106	13	49	Quarterfinal			
2019	1st	8th	32	8	7	17	27	50	31	Quarterfinal	Vugar Asgarov	7	
2020	1st	8th	27	5	5	17	30	48	20	Last 16	Marko Regža	7	

=== Daugavpils in Europe ===
Season	Competition	Round	Opponent	Home	Away	Aggregate
2025–26	UEFA Conference League	1QR	(Albania) Vllaznia	2–4	1–0	3–4
2027–28	UEFA Conference League	1QR				

== Squad ==
As of 4 September, 2026

Note: Flags indicate national team as defined under FIFA eligibility rules; some limited exceptions apply. Players may hold more than one non-FIFA nationality.

No.	Pos.	Nation	Player
1	GK	LAT	Jurijs Saveļjevs
2	MF	LAT	Rinolds Baikovs
3	FW	NGR	Doukumo Ayebadiepreye
4	FW	CMR	William Mukwelle
5	DF	SEN	Papa Gningue
6	MF	LAT	Ņikita Barkovskis
8	MF	LAT	Raivis Skrebels
9	FW	CIV	Abdoul Kader Toure
10	MF	LAT	Edgars Ivanovs (captain)
11	FW	NGR	Joel Yakubu (on loan from Slovan Liberec)
12	GK	LAT	Jānis Beks (on loan from RFS)
14	MF	LAT	Rolands Dauksts
19	FW	LAT	Ervins Pinaskins

No.	Pos.	Nation	Player
20	MF	CGO	Junior Tchibinda
27	FW	LAT	Maksims Kopilovs
30	MF	LAT	Linards Lozda
33	DF	LAT	Dāvis Cucurs
34	DF	NED	Ziad Ouled-Haj-M'hand
37	DF	LAT	Glebs Mihalcovs
42	MF	LAT	Alims Saveljevs
58	GK	LAT	Vladislavs Razumejevs
66	DF	LAT	Kirils Bujanovs
77	DF	LAT	Rinalds Aizups
85	MF	GHA	Elijah Addai
97	FW	UKR	Daniel Kiwinda (on loan from RFS)
99	GK	LAT	Daniels Aroniško

=== Out on loan ===
Note: Flags indicate national team as defined under FIFA eligibility rules; some limited exceptions apply. Players may hold more than one non-FIFA nationality.

No.	Pos.	Nation	Player

== Honours ==
- Latvian First League
  - Champions (2): 2013, 2018
