= Future League =

LVBET League LVBET Līga
- Organising body: Latvian Football Federation
- Founded: 1992; 34 years ago
- Country: Latvia
- Number of clubs: 14
- Level on pyramid: 2
- Promotion to: Virslīga
- Relegation to: LIIGA
- Domestic cup: Latvian Cup
- Current champions: Ogre United (2025)
- Most championships: 2 RKB-Arma Rīga; FB Gulbene; BFC Daugavpils; FK Auda
- Sponsor(s): LVBET
- Website: lff.lv/nakotnes-liga
- Current: 2026 Future League

The Future League (Latvian: Nākotnes Līga), currently known as the LVBET League (LVBET līga) for commercial purposes, and prior to 2021 as the Latvian First League (Latvijas Pirmā līga, 1. līga) is the second tier division of football in Latvia organised by the Latvian Football Federation since 1992. Its winners gain promotion to the Latvian Higher League (Virslīga), while the relegated teams move to the Latvian Second League.

== History ==
Since the beginning of football in modern-day Latvia in the early 1910s, the football league pyramid of Latvia was first fragmented into regional competitions, with the teams from the capital, the Riga Football Cup, dominating over the few regional teams up until the late 1920s. With the formation of a regular Latvian Higher League or Virslīga in 1927, the approximate second level of the football pyramid consisted of the provincial championships of the four Historical Latvian Lands (Provinces meistarsacīkstes) and the Riga First League (Rīgas 1. līga), founded in 1923 and 1922 respectively. The promotion and relegation system often changed or was not used.

During the Soviet occupation of Latvia, the second division of Latvian football league was called the B class of the Latvian SSR (Latvian: Latvijas PSR B klase), with the top level being the Higher Football League of the Latvian SSR. In the USSR football league system the B class was the third tier of competitions. Until 1991 the B class was also divided into regional tournaments such as the Riga Region Football Championship, Daugavpils Region Football championship, Liepāja Region Football championship and the Valmiera Region Football Championship.

After the restoration of the independence of Latvia and the accession to UEFA, the current Latvian First League was founded together with the other modern Latvian football competitions in 1992. From 2007 to 2008, the tournament was known as the Traffic 1. līga, due to its first sponsorship deal concluded with the "Traffic auto advert" advertising company. From 2015 to 2020 its name was Komanda.lv First League (Komanda.lv 1. līga) for sponsorship reasons, after the Komanda.lv sporting goods company became the league's main sponsor in 2015.

It was renamed the Future League before the 2021 season. Between 2021 and 2024, the league's general sponsor was the gambling company Optibet, so the league was called Optibet Future League (Optibet Nākotnes līga). From the 2026 season, the league's general sponsor is the sports betting company LVBET and its full name was changed to LVBET League.

== Format ==
There are 14 clubs in the First League. During the course of the season each club plays every other club twice, once at home and once away, with a total of 26 games. At the end of the season, the highest placed club is automatically promoted to the Virslīga. The second lowest placed club in the Virslīga and the second placed club in the First League compete in a two-legged tie for the remaining place in the following season's Virslīga. The two clubs finishing at the bottom of the First League are relegated to the Second League, while the third-from-bottom team competes in a two-legged tie with the third-placed team of the Second League for a place in the First League.

== Participating clubs (2026) ==
- Rēzekne (Rēzekne)
- Mārupes SC (Mārupe)
- FK Metta (Rīga)
- JDFS Alberts (Riga)
- Leevon PPK (Rīga)
- FK Smiltene/BJSS (Smiltene)
- Skanstes SK (Rīga)
- AFA Olaine (Olaine)
- JFK Ventspils (Ventspils)
- Riga FC-2 (Rīga)
- FK RFS-2 (Rīga)
- Valmiera FC (Valmiera)
- FK Tukums 2000-2 (Tukums)
- Riga Mariners (Rīga)

== Past winners ==
| Season | Winner | Total wins | Runner-up |
|---|---|---|---|
| 1992 | Decemviri Rīga | 1 | Zenta Rīga |
| 1993 | Gemma-RFS | 1 | Baltnet Daugavpils |
| 1994 | FK Kvadrāts | 1 | Starts Brocēni |
| 1995 | FK Jūrnieks | 1 | FK Lokomotīve Daugavpils |
| 1996 | Vecrīga Rīga | 1 | FK Valmiera |
| 1997 | Ranto/AVV | 1 | FK Jūrnieks |
| 1998 | PFK Rīga | 1 | Jaunība Daugavpils |
| 1999 | LU-Daugava | 1 | LBB-Mido |
| 2000 | Zibens-Zemessardze Daugavpils | 1 | Skonto/Metāls Rīga |
| 2001 | Auda Rīga | 1 | RKB-Arma Rīga |
| 2002 | RKB-Arma Rīga | 2^{a} | Ditton Daugavpils |
| 2003 | FK Jūrmala | 1 | Multibanka Rīga |
| 2004 | FK Ventspils-2 | 1 | Ditton-2 Daugavpils |
| 2005 | Skonto-2 Rīga | 1 | Skonto-2 Rīga |
| 2006 | JFK Olimps Rīga | 1 | Ditton-2 Daugavpils |
| 2007 | FK Vindava Ventspils | 1 | FK Blāzma Rēzekne |
| 2008 | FK Daugava | 1 | FC Tranzīts |
| 2009 | FK Jelgava | 1 | FK Jaunība Rīga |
| 2010 | FB Gulbene 2005 | 1 | FC Jūrmala |
| 2011 | FS METTA/LU | 1 | FK Liepājas Metalurgs-2 |
| 2012 | FK Liepājas Metalurgs-2 | 1 | Ilūkstes NSS |
| 2013 | BFC Daugavpils | 1 | FB Gulbene 2005 |
| 2014 | FB Gulbene 2005 | 2 | Rēzeknes BJSS |
| 2015 | Riga FC | 1 | Valmiera Glass FK/BSS |
| 2016 | SK Babīte | 1 | Olaine/Super Nova |
| 2017 | FK Valmiera Glass/ViA | 1 | FK Progress/AFA Olaine |
| 2018 | BFC Daugavpils/Progress | 2 | SK Super Nova |
| 2019 | FK Tukums 2000 | 1 | SK Super Nova |
| 2020 | FC Lokomotiv Daugavpils | 1 | FK Auda |
| 2021 | FK Auda | 2 | FK Tukums 2000 |
| 2022 | FS Jelgava | 1 | Grobiņas SC |
| 2023 | Grobiņas SC | 1 | Riga FC-2 |
| 2024 | SK Super Nova | 1 | RFS-2 |
| 2025 | Ogre United | 1 | JDFS Alberts |

^{a} Previously won as Ranto/AVV.
