= AFA Olaine =

Latvian football club

- Full name: Apvienotā Futbola Akadēmija Olaine
- Founded: 2013; 13 years ago
- Ground: Olaines pilsētas stadions, Olaine, Latvia
- Chairman: Aleksejs Gromovs
- Manager: Andrejs Kolidzejs
- League: Latvian First League
- 2025: 13th
- Website: http://www.afaolaine.lv/

AFA Olaine is a Latvian football club. They compete in the second-highest division of Latvian football (1. līga) and the Latvian Football Cup.

== First-team squad ==
As of 30 April 2017

Note: Flags indicate national team as defined under FIFA eligibility rules; some limited exceptions apply. Players may hold more than one non-FIFA nationality.

No.	Pos.	Nation	Player
1	GK	LAT	Markuss Deins Aivars
2	DF	LAT	Elmārs Ģēģers
3	DF	LAT	Emils Aivars
4	DF	LAT	Niks Edžus Bērziņš
5	MF	LAT	Artjoms Troickis
6	MF	LAT	Jānis Vinogradovs
7	MF	LAT	Jurijs Dementjevs
8	MF	LAT	Normunds Kaļķis
10	FW	LAT	Maksims Neverovskis
11	FW	LAT	Anatolijs Maksimenko
12	DF	LAT	Sandis Arājs
13	MF	LAT	Jevgēnijs Aleksejevs
14	FW	AZE	Vugar Askerov

No.	Pos.	Nation	Player
15	MF	LAT	Artjoms Troickis
16	GK	LAT	Vjačeslavs Serdcevs
17	DF	LAT	Edgars Strautiņš
19	DF	LAT	Kārlis Rūja
21	MF	LAT	Voldemārs Baroniņš
24	FW	LAT	Marks Pačepko
25	DF	LAT	Aigars Višņevskis
26	DF	LAT	Vladislavs Ždaņko
81	GK	LAT	Artemijs Ivaškins
