= FK Grobiņa =

Latvian football club

Grobiņa
- Full name: Futbola Klubs Grobiņa
- Founded: 2009
- Ground: Grobiņa Stadium, Grobiņa, Latvia
- Capacity: 200
- Manager: Viktors Dobrecovs
- League: Virslīga
- 2025: Virslīga, 9th of 10
- Website: https://www.fkgrobina.com
Home colours	Away colours

FK Grobiņa is a Latvian football club based in Grobiņa and plays in the first tier of Latvian football, the Latvian Higher League and the Latvian Football Cup. The club was founded as Grobiņas SC (short for Grobiņas sporta centrs, Grobiņa Sports Center) in 2009.

In 2016 Grobiņas SC won the Latvian Second League Kurzeme Regional League and therefore qualified for the 2nd League final tournament which they won as well (beating SK Cēsis in finals) and with that earning promotion to First League. In their First League debut season they achieved 4th place.

From 2022 to mid-2024 the club had a cooperation agreement with the FK Liepāja youth academy (Liepājas futbola skola), thus having regular players joining/getting loaned from Liepāja and having the prefix LFS next to their name. In 2025, the club was renamed FK Grobiņa.

== Season-by-season results ==
Season	Division (Name)	Pl.	W	D	L	GS	GA	P	Latvian Football Cup
2010	3rd (2.līga Kurzeme)	8	1	1	6	9	19	4	did not participate
2011	2nd (2.līga Kurzeme)	12	?	?	?	?	?	?	did not participate
2012	6th (2.līga Kurzeme)	12	4	0	8	24	29	12	3rd round
2013	did not participate	-	-	-	-	-	-	-	did not participate
2014	2nd (2.līga Kurzeme)	8	5	1	2	27	8	16	2nd round
2015	3rd (2.līga Kurzeme)	10	6	1	3	24	16	19	4th Round
2016	1st (2.līga Kurzeme)	10	10	0	0	39	4	30	2nd Round
2017	4th (First League)	22	14	2	6	62	41	44	1st Round
2018	9th (First League)	22	6	2	14	40	75	20	4th Round
2019	7th (First League)	27	10	0	17	56	104	30	3rd Round
2020	3rd (First League)	12	5	3	4	23	14	18	4th Round
2021	6th (First League)	14	5	4	5	19	25	19	3rd Round
2022	3rd (First League)	26	17	2	7	85	39	53	1/2finals
2023	1st (First League)	26	21	3	2	71	17	66	3rd Round
2024	9th (Higher League)	36	8	5	23	34	78	29	1/8finals
2025	9th (Higher League)	36	8	8	20	33	64	32	1/8finals
2026	TBA (Higher League)							?	

== Players ==
=== First-team squad ===
As of 8 September, 2026.

Note: Flags indicate national team as defined under FIFA eligibility rules; some limited exceptions apply. Players may hold more than one non-FIFA nationality.

No.	Pos.	Nation	Player
1	GK	LAT	Vjačeslavs Kudrjavcevs
2	DF	LAT	Krisjanis Rupeiks
3	DF	LAT	Dāvids Družiņins
5	DF	LAT	Gustavs Leitāns
6	MF	BEL	Milan Corryn
7	DF	LAT	Jānis Krautmanis
8	MF	NGR	Oladotun Olatunde
9	MF	UKR	Artem Kholod
10	MF	LAT	Devids Dobrecovs
11	FW	LAT	Oļģerds Raščevskis
13	FW	CAN	Ali Aruna
14	DF	LAT	Maksims Sidorovs
15	DF	SRB	Aleksa Jovanović
17	MF	LAT	Artūrs Zjuzins

No.	Pos.	Nation	Player
20	MF	JPN	Hirotaka Yamada
21	GK	LAT	Roberts Ozols
24	MF	LAT	Pauls Borisovs
25	MF	LAT	Dans Sirbu
27	DF	LTU	Rolandas Baravykas
29	MF	UKR	Ivan Matyushenko
32	MF	LAT	Gļebs Kļuškins
33	GK	LAT	Toms Laizans
77	FW	BRA	Dodô
80	FW	UKR	Anton Baydal
87	MF	UKR	Jose Ribeiro
88	MF	UKR	Ivan Tyshchenko (on loan from FSC Bukovyna)
99	FW	LAT	Artjoms Puzirevskis
