= Salaspils FC =

Latvian football club

FK Salaspils
- Founded: 2012
- Ground: Salaspils stadions
- Capacity: 1500
- Chairman: Vjačeslavs Miņins
- League: 2. līga

FK Salaspils is a Latvian football club. They compete in the second-highest division of Latvian football (2. līga) and the Latvian Football Cup. They are based in the town of Salaspils.
