= JDFS Alberts =

Latvian football club

- Full name: Jura Docenko futbola skola "Alberts"
- Founded: 31 March 2008; 18 years ago
- Ground: Daugavgrīvas vidusskolas stadions
- Capacity: 500
- Chairman: Olafs Pulks
- Head coach: Artūrs Zakreševskis
- League: Latvian First League
- 2025: 2nd
- Website: http://jdfs.lv/
Home colours	Away colours	Third colours

Jura Docenko Futbola Skola Alberts, commonly referred to as JDFS Alberts, is a Latvian football club based in Riga, that plays in Latvian First League (1. līga), the second-highest division of Latvian football. The club was founded as a football school in 2008 modeled after the FK Alberts youth pyramid. It was named after a football coach Juris Docenko who died in January 2008. Before the 2015 season the club received a license to participate in the First League. In season 2024, JDFS Alberts qualified for the play-offs for the right to play in the Latvian Higher League. In those, the team competed with the 9th place of the 2024 Latvian Higher League, FK Grobiņa, but lost on aggregate in two games.

== League and Cup history ==
Season	Division (Name)	Pos./Teams	Pl.	W	D	L	GS	GA	P	Latvian Football Cup
2008	3rd (2. līga – Riga region)	9/(10)	18	2	2	14	21	52	8	—
2009	Did not participate									
2010	Did not participate									
2011	3rd (2. līga – Riga region)	8/(11)	20	5	2	13	32	68	17	—
2012	3rd (2. līga – Riga region)	6/(10)	18	9	2	7	46	32	29	—
2013	3rd (2. līga – Riga region)	6/(9)	16	6	2	8	32	52	20	Third round
2014	Played as a part of FK Daugava Rīga reserve squad									
2015	2nd (1. līga)	9/(16)	30	11	2	17	35	55	35	Round of 16
2016	2nd (1. līga)	11/(15)	28	9	2	17	32	61	29	Second round
2017	2nd (1. līga)	6/(14)	22	8	4	10	23	32	28	—
2018	2nd (1. līga)	8/(12)	15	6	4	5	29	21	22	Third round
2019	2nd (1. līga)	4/(10)	27	16	3	8	70	47	51	Round of 16
2020	2nd (1. līga)	4/(9)	12	5	3	4	11	16	18	Third round
2021	2nd (1. līga)	9/(10)	14	2	6	6	12	19	12	Third round
2022	2nd (1. līga)	6/(14)	26	13	6	7	38	25	45	Round of 16
2023	2nd (1. līga)	4/(14)	26	13	8	5	60	36	47	Quarter-finals
2024	2nd (1. līga)	3/(14)	26	19	1	6	53	21	58	Round of 16

== Current squad ==
As of 30 April 2021.

Note: Flags indicate national team as defined under FIFA eligibility rules; some limited exceptions apply. Players may hold more than one non-FIFA nationality.

No.	Pos.	Nation	Player
1	GK	LAT	Germans Māliņš
2	MF	LAT	Haralds Kalniņš
3	DF	LAT	Kārlis Strautmanis (captain)
4	DF	LAT	Roberts Adītājs
5	MF	LAT	Dāvis Indrāns
6	MF	LAT	Artūrs Ozoliņš
7	MF	LAT	Dāvis Zeltiņš
8	MF	LAT	Kristaps Maksimovs
9	FW	LAT	Kārlis Pirktiņš
10	FW	LAT	Emīls Evelons
11	DF	LAT	Kristers Augusts
12	GK	LAT	Miks Gucs

No.	Pos.	Nation	Player
14	MF	LAT	Tomass Zāgs
15	DF	LAT	Renārs Rode
17	FW	LAT	Natans Kats
19	FW	LAT	Matiss Zegele
20	MF	LAT	Pauls Dombrovskis
21	MF	LAT	Harijs Vīksna
22	MF	LAT	Daniels Viesturs Melbārdis
23	DF	LAT	Jānis Pakalns
24	DF	LAT	Artis Ķempelis
25	DF	LAT	Mārtiņš Veckāgans
26	MF	LAT	Mārcis Pūce
27	DF	LAT	Roberts Gudēns

== Team staff ==
Position	Name
Head coach	(Latvia) Artūrs Zakreševskis
Coach	(Latvia) Edijs Daņilovs
Coach	(Latvia) Gatis Kalniņš
Goalkeeping coach	(Latvia) Oskars Matisons
Chairman of the Board	(Latvia) Olafs Pulks
