= FK Tukums 2000 =

Association football club in Tukums, Latvia

Tukums 2000
- Full name: Futbola klubs Tukums 2000
- Founded: 2000; 26 years ago
- Ground: Tukuma Pilsētas Stadions, Tukums, Latvia
- Chairman: Verners Akimovs
- Manager: Kristaps Dišlers
- League: Virslīga
- 2025: Virslīga, 7th of 10
- Website: http://www.fktukums2000.lv/
Home colours	Away colours

FK Tukums 2000 is Latvian professional football club located in Tukums. Since its foundation, the club has been training young boys and girls. In 2007 the club formed a men's team that could play in the second-highest division of Latvian football (the Latvian First League).

== History ==
FK Tukums was founded on May 20, 2000, as "FK Tukums-2000. The club started its participation in the Latvian Second League in 2004, finishing in 4th place. In 2005, FK Tukums-2000 played in the Latvian First League and finished in 13th place at the end of the season. The 2008 season was yet again spent in the Second League, the third tier of Latvian football. The club finished in 3rd place. Several players with Latvian Higher League experience were invited to join, and not surprisingly the team won the Latvian First League that year, being promoted to the Latvian Higher League. At the end of the 2014 season they were relegated to the Latvian First League.

== Players ==
As of 5 September, 2026

Note: Flags indicate national team as defined under FIFA eligibility rules; some limited exceptions apply. Players may hold more than one non-FIFA nationality.

No.	Pos.	Nation	Player
1	GK	LAT	Sergejs Vilkovs (on loan from RFS)
4	MF	LAT	Kaspars Anmanis
6	MF	LAT	Kristers Volkovs
7	MF	JPN	Shun Shibata
8	DF	LAT	Rudolfs Reingolcs
10	MF	LAT	Bogdans Samoilovs
11	MF	BRA	Leoni Gastaldelo
12	GK	LAT	Alekss Kuprins
16	MF	LAT	Kristaps Klavins
17	DF	UKR	Maksym Derkach (on loan from RFS)
18	MF	LAT	Davis Calbergs
19	FW	LAT	Daniels Radzenieks (on loan from Liepāja)

No.	Pos.	Nation	Player
21	DF	LAT	Dāvis Valmiers
23	FW	LAT	Ilja Atligins
25	MF	LAT	Helvijs Joksts
27	FW	LAT	Ruslans Deruzinskis
28	DF	LAT	Rudolfs Melkis (on loan from Liepāja)
31	MF	JPN	Koyo Shigema (on loan from Ryukyu)
32	MF	LAT	Kristaps Ūzis
33	MF	JPN	Jun Toba
35	GK	LAT	Kristofers Minajevs
37	MF	JPN	Tomo Matsubara
46	DF	UGA	Allan Enyou
88	DF	LAT	Martins Štāls

=== Out on loan ===
Note: Flags indicate national team as defined under FIFA eligibility rules; some limited exceptions apply. Players may hold more than one non-FIFA nationality.

No.	Pos.	Nation	Player
