= FK Smiltene/BJSS =

Latvian football club

- Founded: 2000
- Ground: Tepera stadions, Smiltene, Latvia
- Manager: Andis Rozītis
- League: Latvian First League
- 2025: 10th
- Website: http://www.fksmiltene.lv/
Home colours	Away colours

FK Smiltene/BJSS is a Latvian football club. They compete in the second-highest division of Latvian football (1. līga) and Latvian Football Cup. They are based in Smiltene.
