= Rēzeknes FA/BJSS =

Latvian football club

- Full name: Rēzeknes Futbola Akadēmija: Rēzeknes BJSS (2011–14)
- Founded: 2011; 15 years ago
- Ground: RPD Sporta pārvaldes stadions
- Capacity: 1000
- Chairman: Žanis Ārmanis
- Head Coach: Guntars Silagailis
- League: Latvian First League
- 2025: 9th
- Website: http://www.rezeknesfutbols.lv/lv/
Home colours	Away colours

Rēzeknes Futbola Akadēmija/Bērnu un jauniešu sporta skola (English: Football Academy of Rēzekne/Children and Youth Sports school) is a Latvian football club based in Rēzekne. They compete in the second-highest division of Latvian football (1. līga) and the Latvian Football Cup.
