= 2016–17 Latvian Football Cup =

Tournament details
- Country: Latvia
- Teams: 47

The 2016–17 Latvian Football Cup was the 22nd edition of the Latvian football knockout tournament. The winners will qualify for the first qualifying round of the 2017–18 UEFA Europa League.

== Participating clubs ==
The following teams will take part in the competition:

2016 Latvian Virsliga all 8 teams	2016 Latvian First League; 14 teams	2016 Latvian Second League; 25 teams that qualify from the 7 regions of the Second League
BFC Daugavpils; METTA/LU; Jelgava; Liepāja; Riga FC; RFS; Spartaks Jūrmala; Ventspils	Babīte; Rēzeknes FA/BJSS; Skonto FC; FK Auda; Valmiera Glass FK/BSS; AFA Olaine/SK Super Nova; JDFS Alberts; FK Tukums 2000 TSS; FK Smiltene/BJSS; FK Jēkabpils/JSC; FK Staiceles Bebri; FK Ogre; Preiļu BJSS; JFK Saldus	Ludzas SK; Dinamo Rīga; Kuldīgas; FK Salacgrīva; Riga United FC; FK Igate/Tami-Tami; FK Limbaži; FK Dobele; FK Pļaviņas DM; FK Nīca; Grobiņas; FK Krāslava; FK Talsi/Laidze; FK Upesciems; Cēsis; Salaspils; Caramba Riga; Optibet Tractor; FK Mērsrags; SS Saldus/Brocēni BJSS; FK Lielupe; FK Aliance; JFC Dobele; FK Alberts; FK Fortuna/Ogre

== First round ==
The first round consists of 8 matches, between 16 of the qualifying teams from the Latvian Second League. 9 teams from the Second League automatically qualified for the second round, based on a lottery. The matches of this round took place on 4–15 June 2016.

Team 1	Score	Team 2
4 June
Ludzas SK (3)	0–0 (a.e.t.) (3–4 p)	Dinamo Rīga (3)
Kuldīgas (3)	3–0	FK Salacgrīva (3)
5 June
Riga United FC (3)	1–4	FK Igate/Tami-Tami (3)
FK Limbaži (3)	2–3 (a.e.t.)	FK Dobele (3)
FK Pļaviņas DM (3)	1–2	FK Nīca (3)
10 June
Grobiņas (3)	3–8	FK Krāslava (3)
11 June
FK Talsi/Laidze (3)	3–1	FK Upesciems (3)
15 June
Cēsis (3)	2–0	Salaspils (3)

== Second round ==
The 8 winners of the first round joined the 9 Second League teams that automatically qualified, in addition to 14 teams from the First League. These 32 teams played 15 head-to-head matches to determine who will move on to the third round. The matches of this round took place on 26 June–7 July 2016. FK Lielupe received a bye.

Team 1	Score	Team 2
26 June
Cēsis (3)	2–1	FK Aliance (3)
2 July
FK Krāslava (3)	4–0	FK Fortuna/Ogre (3)
FK Dobele (3)	2–6	FK Staiceles Bebri (2)
Kuldīgas (3)	6–0	SS Saldus/Brocēni BJSS (3)
Dinamo Rīga (3)	0–2	FK Jēkabpils/JSC (2)
AFA Olaine/SK Super Nova (2)	3–0	JDFS Alberts (2)
Optibet Tractor (3)	2–2 (a.e.t.) (3–4 p)	FK Mērsrags (3)
3 July
FK Nīca (3)	1–3	FK Auda (2)
Preiļu BJSS (2)	0–1	FK Ogre (2)
FK Alberts (3)	0–6	Caramba Riga (3)
JFC Dobele (3)	0–17	Skonto FC (2)
FK Talsi/Laidze (3)	w/o	JFK Saldus (2)
4 July
FK Igate/Tami-Tami (3)	0–6	FK Tukums 2000 TSS (2)
6 July
Babīte (2)	6–0	Valmiera Glass FK/BSS (2)
7 July
FK Smiltene/BJSS (2)	1–2	Rēzeknes FA/BJSS (2)

== Third round ==
Team 1	Score	Team 2
9 July
FK Jēkabpils/JSC (2)	1–1 (a.e.t.) (8–7 p)	AFA Olaine/SK Super Nova (2)
FK Ogre (2)	4–0	Cēsis (3)
FK Mērsrags (3)	0–8	Caramba Riga (3)
Skonto FC (2)	5–0	FK Krāslava (3)
FK Tukums 2000 TSS (2)	4–2	FK Auda (2)
FK Talsi/Laidze (3)	0–3	Babīte (2)
10 July
Rēzeknes FA/BJSS (2)	16–1	Kuldīgas (3)
FK Staiceles Bebri (2)	8–1	FK Lielupe (3)

== Fourth round ==
Teams from the Latvian Higher League enter at this stage.

Team 1	Score	Team 2
16 July
Caramba Riga (3)	2–5	Liepāja (1)
FK Tukums 2000 TSS (2)	0–1	BFC Daugavpils (1)
17 July
FK Staiceles Bebri (2)	0–4	Riga FC (1)
FK Jēkabpils/JSC (2)	0–10	Spartaks Jūrmala (1)
Babīte (2)	0–2	METTA/LU (1)
Skonto FC (2)	0–2 (a.e.t.)	Jelgava (1)
18 July
FK Ogre (2)	0–7	RFS (1)
25 September
Rēzeknes FA/BJSS (2)	0–2	Ventspils (1)

== Quarter-finals ==
Team 1	Score	Team 2
8 April
Ventspils (1)	3–0	Liepāja (1)
Spartaks Jūrmala (1)	1–0	Jelgava (1)
9 April
Riga FC (1)	3–0	BFC Daugavpils (1)
METTA/LU (1)	0–1	RFS (1)

== Semi final ==
Played on 26 April 2017 and 3 May 2017; over two legs.

Team 1	Team 2	Leg 1	Leg 2	Agg. score
RFS (1)	Ventspils (1)	1–1	0–1	1–1
Riga FC (1)	Spartaks Jūrmala (1)	2–0	2–1	4–1

== Final ==
The final was played on 17 May 2017
Skonto Stadions, Riga
Referee : Andris Treimanis

Team 1	Score	Team 2
Riga FC	2–2 (a.e.t.) (5–6 p)	Ventspils
