= 2014–15 Latvian Football Cup =

Tournament details
- Country: Latvia
- Teams: 16

Final positions
- Champions: Jelgava
- Runners-up: Ventspils

The 2014–15 Latvian Football Cup was the twentieth edition of the Latvian football knockout competition. The winners will qualify for the first qualifying round of the 2015–16 UEFA Europa League.

== First round ==
The matches of this round took place on 1 June 2014.

Team 1	Score	Team 2
1 June
Dinamo Rīga (3)	1–0	Traktors (3)
2 June
Rīnūži-Strong (3)	7–2	Rīga United (3)
5 June
Lielupe (3)	0–9	Kuldīgas (3)
Bandava (3)	2–1	Nīca (3)
7 June
Grobiņa (3)	4–2	Fortuna (3)
Monarhs Flaminko (3)	2–0	Alberts (3)
Zelis Gulbene (3)	0–6	Staiceles Bebri (3)
8 June
Dobele (3)	0–2	Caramba Rīga (3)

== Second round ==
The matches of this round took place on 12 June 2014.

Team 1	Score	Team 2
12 June
Ādaži (3)	0–2	Dinamo Rīga (3)
14 June
Balvu (3)	3–4	Grobiņa (3)
18 June
Caramba Rīga (3)	3–2	Upesciems (3)
19 June
Staiceles Bebri (3)	8–0	Marienburg (3)
20 June
Carnikava (3)	4–5	Rīnūži-Strong (3)
21 June
Bandava (3)	3–2	Ludzas NSS (3)
Kuldīgas (3)	2–4	RTU FC (3)
Laidze (3)	1–8	Monarhs Flaminko (3)

== Third round ==
The matches of this round took place on 5 July 2014.

Team 1	Score	Team 2
5 July
Ogre (2)	4–0	Dinamo Rīga (3)
Staiceles Bebri (3)	5–0	Pļaviņas DM (2)
Valmiera Glass FK/BSS (2)	2–1 (a.e.t.)	RTU FC (3)
AFA Olaine (2)	0–1	Tukums 2000/TSS (2)
Smiltene/BJSS (2)	4–0	JFK Saldus (2)
Salaspils (2)	1–4	Rīgas Futbola skola (2)
6 July
Jēkabpils/JSC (2)	1–4	Gulbene (2)
SFK United (2)	1–2 (a.e.t.)	Rīnūži-Strong (3)
Preiļu BJSS (2)	2–1	Caramba Rīga (3)
Grobiņa (3)	5–2	Bandava (3)
Rēzeknes BJSS (2)	w/o	Monarhs Flaminko (3)
1625 Liepāja (2)	w/o	Auda (2)

== Fourth round ==
The matches of this round took place on 12 July 2014.

Team 1	Score	Team 2
12 July
Valmiera Glass FK/BSS (2)	0–3	1625 Liepāja (2)
Rīgas Futbola skola (2)	5–2	Preiļu BJSS (2)
Grobiņa (3)	2–3	Ogre (2)
Tukums 2000/TSS (2)	1–0	Rēzeknes BJSS (2)
Gulbene (2)	3–0	Staiceles Bebri (3)
13 July
Rīnūži-Strong (3)	0–2	Smiltene/BJSS (2)

== Round of 16 ==
The matches of this round took place on 19 July 2014.

Team 1	Score	Team 2
19 July
Smiltene/BJSS (2)	0–2	Daugava Rīga (1)
1625 Liepāja (2)	0–6	Liepāja (1)
Tukums 2000/TSS (2)	1–4	Daugavpils (1)
METTA/LU (1)	0–2	Skonto (1)
20 July
Jūrmala (1)	1–7	Jelgava (1)
Ogre (2)	3–0^{1}	Daugava Daugavpils (1)
21 July
Rīgas Futbola skola (2)	0–3	Spartaks Jūrmala (1)
7 October^{2}
Gulbene (2)	0–4	Ventspils (1)

^{1} LFF Disciplinary Committee awarded Ogre a 3–0 win due to Daugava Daugavpils fielding suspended player Aleksandrs Solovjovs. The original match had ended in a 3–1 win for Daugava Daugavpils.
^{2} due to FK Ventspils participation in the UEFA Champions League, the game took place on October 7.

=== Results ===
19 July 2014	Smiltene/BJSS (2)	0–2	Daugava Rīga (1)	Valmiera
15:00		Report	Tomkevičius 49'; Ziļs 89' (pen.)	Stadium: Valmieras FK stadions Referee: Vitālijs Spasjoņņikovs

19 July 2014	1625 Liepāja (2)	0–6	Liepāja (1)	Liepāja
17:00		Report	Gladilins 18' (o.g.); J. Ikaunieks 24'; D. Ikaunieks 28', 47'; Varažinskis 72' (pen.), 85' (pen.)	Stadium: Stadions Daugava mākslīgas laukums Referee: Andris Treimanis

19 July 2014	Tukums 2000/TSS (2)	1–4	Daugavpils (1)	Tukums
17:00	Sarva 81'	Report	Catlakšs 2'; Tarasovs 4', 89'; Nakano 63'	Stadium: Tukuma pilsētas stadions Referee: Aleksandrs Golubevs

19 July 2014	METTA/LU (1)	0–2	Skonto (1)	Riga
17:00		Report	Klimiashvili 65'; Mingazow 86'	Stadium: Hanzas vidusskolas laukums Referee: Mareks Ķere

20 July 2014	Ogre (2)	3–0	Daugava Daugavpils (1)	Ogre
16:00	Rudzītis 90+2'	Report	Kumpiņš 16' (o.g.); Sikorskyi 49'; Kushnirov 67'	Stadium: Ogres pilsētas stadions Referee: Vadims Direktorenko

20 July 2014	Jūrmala (1)	1–7	Jelgava (1)	Jūrmala
17:00	Studāns 71'	Report	Jirgensons 17', 78'; Jaudzems 35', 65'; Kirilins 39'; Dresmanis 59'; Ratkevičs 73'	Stadium: Slokas Stadium; Referee: Aleksandrs Anufrievs

21 July 2014	Rīgas Futbola skola (2)	0–3	Spartaks Jūrmala (1)	Riga
17:00		Report	Stuglis 37', 50'; Kozlovs 60'	Stadium: Stadions Arkādija grass Referee: Ivars Caune

7 October 2014	Gulbene (2)	0–4	Ventspils (1)	Riga
13:00			Tarkhnishvili 22', 30' (pen.); Diagne 35'; Karlsons 57'	Stadium: Stadions Arkādija grass Attendance: 50; Referee: Dmitrijs Naļivajko

== Quarterfinals ==
The matches were played on 4 and 5 April 2015.

Team 1	Score	Team 2
TBA
Jelgava (1)	CANC	Daugava Rīga (?)
Liepāja (1)	2-1	Skonto (1)
Ogre (2)	0-5	Spartaks Jūrmala (1)
Ventspils (1)	3-0	Daugavpils (1)

== Semifinals ==
The matches were played on 25 and 26 April 2015.

Team 1	Score	Team 2
Jelgava (1)	2–0	Liepāja (1)
Spartaks Jūrmala (1)	1–1 (a.e.t.); 1–3 (pen.)	Ventspils (1)

== Final ==
The match will be played on 20 May 2015.

Team 1	Score	Team 2
Jelgava (1)	2–0	Ventspils (1)
