= Mārcis Ošs =

Latvian footballer

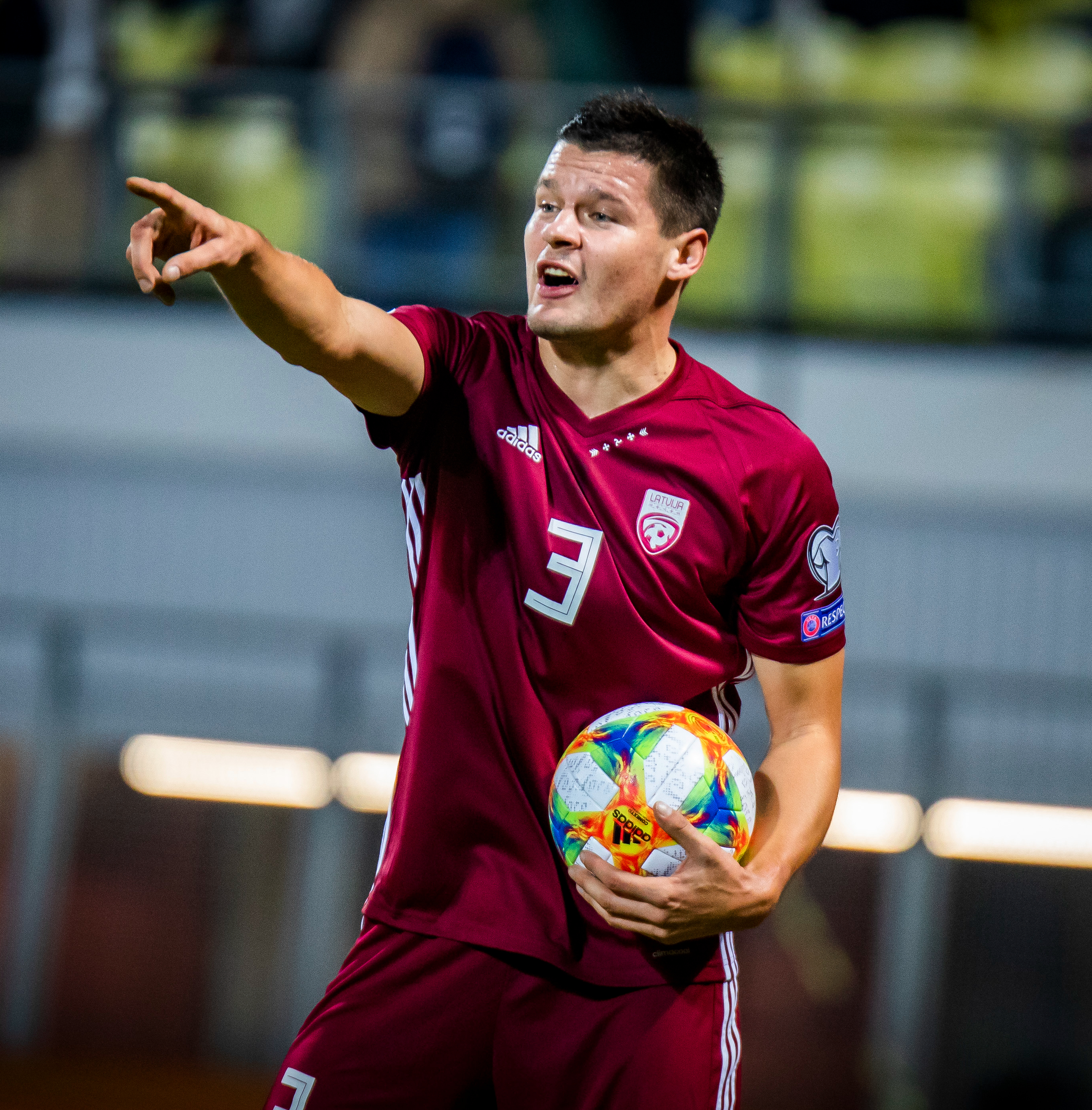

Personal information
- Date of birth: 25 July 1991 (age 35)
- Place of birth: Limbaži, Latvia
- Height: 1.92 m (6 ft 4 in)
- Position: Centre-back

Team information
- Current team: Super Nova
- Number: 25

Youth career
- FK Limbaži

Senior career*
Years	Team	Apps	(Gls)
2007–2009	FK Auda	0	(0)
2009–2010	FK Limbaži	0	(0)
2011–2015	FK Jelgava	118	(14)
2016	Górnik Zabrze	9	(0)
2016–2017	FK Jelgava	34	(7)
2018–2022	Spartaks Jūrmala	32	(3)
2018–2020	→ Neuchâtel Xamax (loan)	48	(5)
2020–2021	→ Lugano (loan)	13	(2)
2021–2022	→ Lausanne Ouchy (loan)	1	(0)
2023–2025	RFS	21	(1)
2025–	Super Nova	63	(8)

International career^{‡}
2017–	Latvia	27	(1)
- * Club domestic league appearances and goals as of 12 November 2026 ‡ National team caps and goals as of 1 April 2024

Mārcis Ošs (born 25 July 1991) is a Latvian professional footballer who plays as a centre-back for Super Nova and the Latvian national team.

== Club career ==
On 31 August 2021, he joined Lausanne Ouchy in the Swiss Challenge League on loan.

== International career ==
Ošs was named in Latvia's squad for the 2016 Baltic Cup. He scored his first international goal for his country in a match against Austria on the 19th of November, 2019 in a UEFA 2020 qualification game, which was also a winning goal as match ended 1-0.

== Career statistics ==
As of 20 August 2018

Club	Season	League		Cup		Europe		Other		Total	
Club	Season	Apps	Goals	Apps	Goals	Apps	Goals	Apps	Goals	Apps	Goals
Jelgava	2011	17	5	1	0	–		0	0	18	5
Jelgava	2012	25	1	2	0	–		0	0	27	1
Jelgava	2013	22	1	0	0	–		0	0	22	1
Jelgava	2014	29	4	3	0	2	0	0	0	33	4
Jelgava	2015	25	3	2	0	4	1	0	0	31	4
Jelgava	Total	118	14	8	0	6	1	0	0	132	15
Górnik Zabrze	2015–16	9	0	0	0	–		0	0	9	0
Jelgava	2016	10	0	0	0	–		0	0	10	0
Jelgava	2017	24	7	2	0	2	0	0	0	28	7
Jelgava	Total	34	7	2	0	2	0	0	0	38	7
FK Spartaks Jūrmala	2018	16	3	1	1	6	0	0	0	23	4
Neuchâtel Xamax	2018–19	25	1	2	0	–		2	1	29	2
Neuchâtel Xamax	2018–20	22	4	1	0	–		0	0	23	4
Career total		224	29	14	1	14	1	2	1	254	32

=== International goals ===
Scores and results Latvia's goal tally first.

No.	Date	Venue	Opponent	Score	Result	Competition
1.	19 November 2019	Daugava Stadium, Riga, Latvia	Austria	1–0	1–0	UEFA Euro 2020 qualification

== Honours ==
Jelgava

- Latvian Football Cup: 2013–14, 2014–15

RFS

- Latvian Higher League: 2023

Latvia

- Baltic Cup: 2016

Individual

- Latvian Higher League Best Defender: 2015
