= 2021 Latvian Football Cup =

Tournament details
- Country: Latvia
- Teams: 56

Final positions
- Champions: RFS
- Runners-up: Liepāja

Tournament statistics
- Matches played: 54
- Goals scored: 226 (4.19 per match)

The 2021 Latvian Football Cup was a single elimination association football tournament which began on 27 June 2021. RFS won the cup final 1–0 over Liepāja and earned a place in the first qualifying round of the 2022–23 UEFA Europa Conference League. Liepāja were the defending champions.

== Preliminary round ==
Two preliminary round matches were played on 27 June 2021.

Team 1	Score	Team 2
RTU	1–1 (0–3 p)	JFC Jelgava
Babīte	3–0	FK Dobele Allegro

== First round ==
Fourteen first round matches were played on 3–4 July 2021.

Team 1	Score	Team 2
Kadaga	2–1	Preili
Kvarcs/Madona	1–3	Ludzas
AFA Olaine	0–2	Spēks
Skanste	5–1	Gauja
Kuivižu Spartaks	0–10	Limbaži
Sigulda	4–3	DSVK Traktors
Kalupe	4–5	Kengaroos
Mārupe	5–3	Talsi/Laidze
Caramba	2–0	FK Alberts
FK Pļaviņas DM	0–1	Karosta
Lielupe	1–3	Valka
JFC Jelgava	5–0	Riga United
Bauskas/Mēmele	1–5	Līvāni
Aliance	4–2	FK Staiceles Bebri

== Second round ==
Sixteen second round matches were played on 17–18 July 2021.

Team 1	Score	Team 2
Varakļāni	0–5	Ludzas
Limbaži	4–0	Aliance
Mārupe	1–4	FK Auda
Caramba	11–0	Valka
Jēkabpils	0–2	Grobiņas SC
JDFS Alberts	1–0	Babīte
Skanste	4–0	Tente
Albatroz	5–1	Karosta
Salaspils	0–7	Rēzeknes FA/BJSS
Kadaga	0–6	Smiltene
Tukums	4–0	Līvāni
JFC Jelgava	5–2	Sigulda
Saldus SS/Leevon	2–0	FK Jūrnieks
Super Nova	6–0	Cēsis
Upesciems	2–4	Spēks
Kengaroos	0–2	Dinamo Rīga

== Third round ==
Eight third round matches were played on 31 July and 1 August 2021.

Team 1	Score	Team 2
FK Auda	3–1	Caramba
Limbaži	0–2	Tukums
Smiltene	2–0	JFC Jelgava
JDFS Alberts	1–2	Skanste
Rēzeknes FA/BJSS	3–1	Super Nova
Dinamo Rīga	9–0	Saldus SS/Leevon
Ludzas	0–1	Albatroz
Spēks	4–2	Grobiņas SC

== Fourth round ==
Seven fourth round matches were played on 7–9 August 2021.

Team 1	Score	Team 2
Spartaks Jūrmala	0–1	Daugavpils
Spēks	0–2	Dinamo Rīga
Smiltene	0–3	Liepāja
FK Auda	3–1	Metta/LU
Rēzeknes FA/BJSS	0–3	Albatroz
Tukums	1–3	Riga
Skanste	0–2	RFS

== Quarter–finals ==
The quarter–finals were played on 21–22 August 2021.

Team 1	Score	Team 2
RFS	4–0	FK Auda
Liepāja	1–0 (a.e.t.)	Daugavpils
Valmiera	5–0	Dinamo Rīga
Riga	3–0	Albatroz

== Semi–finals ==
The semi–finals were played on 19 September 2021.

Team 1	Score	Team 2
Liepāja	2–0	Valmiera
RFS	3–1	Riga

== Final ==
The final was played on 24 October 2021.

24 October 2021
14:00

RFS	1–0	Liepāja
Villela 14'	Report

Jāņa Daliņa Stadium, Valmiera
Referee: Andris Treimanis

== See also ==
2021 Latvian Higher League
