= Ritus Krjauklis =

Latvian footballer

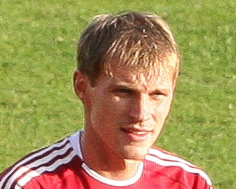
- Ritus Krjauklis playing for Latvia

Personal information
- Date of birth: 23 April 1986 (age 40)
- Place of birth: Ilūkste, Latvian SSR, Soviet Union (now Republic of Latvia)
- Height: 1.88 m (6 ft 2 in)
- Position: Centre-back

Team information
- Current team: Daugavpils

Youth career
- 1993–2002: FK Ilūkste
- 2002–2005: Dinaburg Daugavpils

Senior career*
Years	Team	Apps	(Gls)
2005–2006	Dinaburg Daugavpils	?	(?)
2006	Ventspils	0	(0)
2007–2009	Dinaburg Daugavpils	77	(6)
2010–2011	Ventspils	25	(0)
2011	AZAL PFC	10	(0)
2011–2012	Liepājas Metalurgs	24	(2)
2012–2013	Golden Arrows	17	(0)
2013–2014	Ajax Cape Town	11	(0)
2014	FK Spartaks Jūrmala	30	(0)
2015	FK Ventspils	20	(1)
2016	FK RFS	27	(0)
2017–2018	PKNP	43	(7)
2019	Xinjiang Tianshan Leopard	26	(3)
2021	Nanjing City	8	(0)
2022–	Daugavpils	0	(0)

International career
2009–2012	Latvia	22	(0)
- * Club domestic league appearances and goals as of 11 December 2021 (UTC)

Ritus Krjauklis (born 23 April 1986) is a Latvian footballer who currently plays for Latvian Higher League club Daugavpils as a centre back.

== Club career ==
As a child and teenager, Ritus Krjauklis played for his local club FK Ilūkste under coach Vladimirs Vinokurovs from 1993 till 2002. In 2002, he moved to Daugavpils and continued playing for Dinaburg Daugavpils youth team. In 2005 Krjauklis was taken to the first team by Tamaz Pertia. In 2006 Krjauklis was signed by FK Ventspils but he couldn't prove his abilities there so he had to move back to Daugavpils just one year later. He spent the next 3 seasons there, from 2007 to 2009 respectively, and managed to become a vital player at the club, playing 77 matches and scoring 6 goals during those 3 seasons.

In 2009, after Dinaburg Daugavpils were excluded from the Latvian Higher League because of suspect about betting against their own results, Krjauklis was set free. Then he joined FK Ventspils again. This time he became a starting eleven player and played 25 matches in the 2010 season. After that season Krjauklis accepted an offer from Azerbaijan and signed a two-year contract with the Azerbaijan Premier League club AZAL PFC. His start there was bright as he played in the starting eleven but then, after just 10 matches, in August 2011 he was released. Krjauklis returned home and after a few days was signed by the Latvian Higher League club Liepājas Metalurgs. Until the end of the season he participated in 10 league matches and also managed to score once.

On 15 July 2012, he moved to the South African Premier Soccer League club Golden Arrows. Krjauklis was released from his contract after a single season at Golden Arrows and joined fellow Premier Soccer League club Ajax Cape Town in August 2013. Prior to the 2014 Latvian Higher League season he returned to Latvia, joining FK Spartaks Jūrmala. At the end of January 2015 Krjauklis moved to the defending Latvian champions FK Ventspils.

On 25 February 2019, Krjauklis transferred to the China League One side Xinjiang Tianshan Leopard.

== Career statistics ==
=== Club ===
As of 16 July 2022.

Appearances and goals by club, season and competition
Club	Season	League			Cup		League Cup		Continental		Total	
Club	Season	Division	Apps	Goals	Apps	Goals	Apps	Goals	Apps	Goals	Apps	Goals
Dinaburg Daugavpils	2007	Virslīga	27	3	0	0	–		–		27	3
Dinaburg Daugavpils	2008	Virslīga	27	2	0	0	–		2	0	29	2
Dinaburg Daugavpils	2009	Virslīga	22	1	0	0	–		4	0	26	1
Dinaburg Daugavpils	Total		76	6	0	0	–		6	0	82	6
Ventspils	2010	Virslīga	25	0	2	0	–		–		27	0
AZAL PFC	2010–11	Azerbaijan Premier League	10	0	4	0	–		–		14	0
Liepājas Metalurgs	2011	Virslīga	10	1	0	0	–		1	0	30	0
Liepājas Metalurgs	2012	Virslīga	14	1	3	1	–		2	0	19	1
Liepājas Metalurgs	Total		24	2	3	1	–		3	0	30	3
Golden Arrows	2012–13	South African Premier Division	17	0	0	0	–		–		17	0
Ajax Cape Town	2013–14	South African Premier Division	11	0	0	0	–		–		11	0
FK Spartaks Jūrmala	2014	Virslīga	30	0	0	0	–		–		30	0
FK Ventspils	2015	Virslīga	20	1	3	0	–		–		23	1
FK RFS	2016	Virslīga	27	0	1	0	–		2	0	30	0
PKNP	2017	Malaysia Premier League	22	3	3	0	8	0	–		33	3
PKNP	2018	Malaysia Premier League	21	4	5	0	6	1	–		32	5
PKNP	Total		43	7	8	0	14	1	–		65	8
Xinjiang Tianshan Leopard	2019	China League One	26	3	0	0	–		–		26	3
Nanjing City	2021	China League One	8	0	0	0	–		–		8	0
Daugavpils	2022	Virslīga	25	0	1	0	–		–		26	0
Career Total			318	17	19	0	14	1	8	0	359	18

== International career ==
Ritus Krjauklis made his debut for Latvia in a friendly match against Bulgaria on 12 August 2009. As of 2012, he has been capped 18 times, scoring no goals. He received regular call-ups under the management of Aleksandrs Starkovs till 2012, but since the appointment of Marians Pahars in 2013 Krjauklis has not been called up to the team. As of February 2015, he has played 22 international matches for Latvia, scoring no goals.

== Honours ==
FK Ventspils

- Latvian League: 2006
- Baltic League: 2010

Latvia

- Baltic Cup: 2012
