= Eduards Emsis =

Latvian footballer (born 1996)

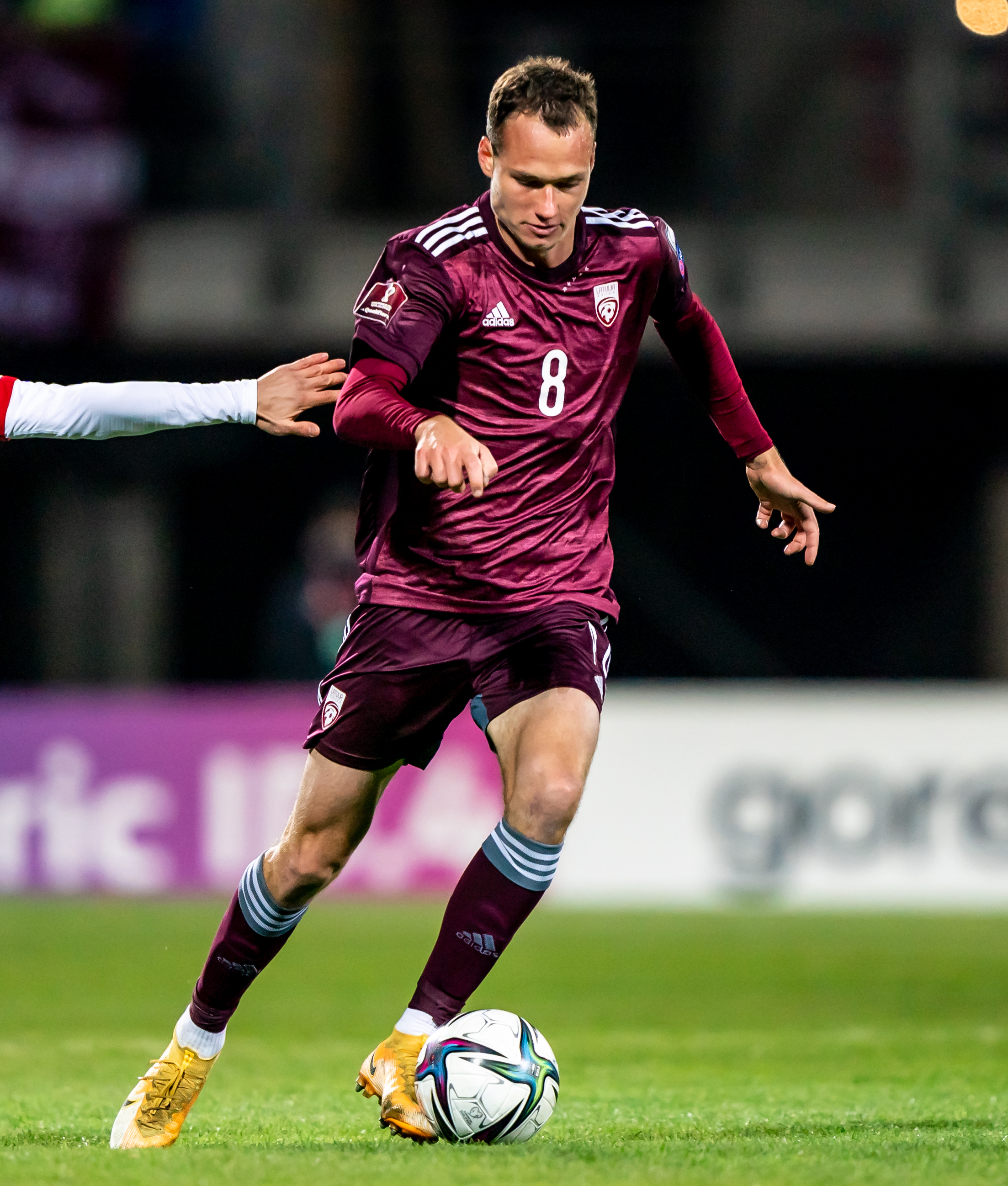

Personal information
- Date of birth: 23 February 1996 (age 30)
- Height: 1.84 m (6 ft 1/2 in)
- Position: Midfielder

Team information
- Current team: Super Nova
- Number: 11

Senior career*
Years	Team	Apps	(Gls)
2014–2018	Metta / LU	75	(3)
2019	Jelgava	3	(0)
2020–2021	Noah	40	(0)
2022	Lahti	18	(0)
2023	Egnatia	14	(0)
2023–2024	Raufoss	23	(1)
2025–	Super Nova	43	(0)

International career^{‡}
2018–	Latvia	35	(2)
- * Club domestic league appearances and goals as of 12 November 2026 ‡ National team caps and goals as of 12 June 2026

Eduards Emsis (born 23 February 1996) is a Latvian international footballer who plays for Super Nova as a midfielder.

== Club career ==
He has played club football for FS METTA/Latvijas Universitāte.

Emsis joined FK Jelgava for the 2019 season.

On 17 January 2020, FC Noah announced the signing of Emsis.

On 21 January 2022, he signed with Lahti in Finland for the 2022 season.

On 2 August 2023, he signed with Raufoss in Norway, on a contract until the end of 2024.

== International career ==
He made his international debut for the Latvia in 2018.

== Career statistics ==
=== Club ===
As of 15 June 2026.

Appearances and goals by club, season and competition
Club	Season	League			Cup		Other		Europe		Total	
Club	Season	Division	Apps	Goals	Apps	Goals	Apps	Goals	Apps	Goals	Apps	Goals
Skonto Riga	2013	Virslīga	0	0	0	0	1 (Note: Includes Latvian Supercup)	0	0	0	1	0
Skonto Riga II	2013	Latvian First League	18	2	–		–		–		18	2
Metta / LU	2014	Virslīga	2	0	–		0 (Note: Includes Virslīga relegation play-offs)	0	–		2	0
Metta / LU	2015	Virslīga	14	0	2	0	2	0	–		18	0
Metta / LU	2016	Virslīga	23	1	1	0	2	0	–		26	1
Metta / LU	2017	Virslīga	20	1	2	1	2	2	–		24	4
Metta / LU	2018	Virslīga	16	1	1	0	–		–		17	1
Metta / LU	Total		75	3	6	1	6	2	0	0	87	6
Jelgava	2019	Virslīga	3	0	0	0	–		–		3	0
Noah	2019–20	Armenian Premier League	13	0	3	0	–		–		16	0
Noah	2020–21	Armenian Premier League	17	1	3	0	1 (Note: Appearance in Armenian Supercup)	0	1 (Note: Appearance(s) in UEFA Europa League)	0	22	1
Noah	2021–22	Armenian Premier League	10	0	1	0	–		2 (Note: Appearances in UEFA Conference League)	0	13	0
Noah	Total		40	1	7	0	1	0	3	0	51	1
Lahti	2022	Veikkausliiga	18	0	4	0	5 (Note: Three appearances in Finnish League Cup and two appearances in Veikkausliiga relegation play-offs)	0	–		27	0
Egnatia	2022–23	Kategoria Superiore	14	0	4	0	–		–		18	0
Raufoss IL	2023	1. divisjon	14	1	–		–		–		14	1
Raufoss IL	2024	1. divisjon	9	0	4	1	–		–		13	1
Raufoss IL	Total		23	1	4	1	0	0	0	0	27	2
SK Super Nova	2025	Latvian Higher League	10	0	1	0	–		–		11	0
SK Super Nova	2026	Latvian Higher League	16	0	0	0	–		–		16	0
SK Super Nova	Total		26	0	1	0	0	0	0	0	27	0
Career total			217	7	26	2	13	2	3	0	259	11

=== International goals ===
Scores and results list Latvia's goal tally first.

No.	Date	Venue	Opponent	Score	Result	Competition
1.	4 June 2021	Daugava Stadium, Riga, Latvia	Lithuania	2–1	3–1	Baltic Cup
2.	16 June 2023	Skonto Stadium, Riga, Latvia	Turkey	1–1	2–3	UEFA Euro 2024 qualifying
