= Ryotaro Nakano =

Japanese footballer

Personal information
- Date of birth: 13 June 1988 (age 38)
- Place of birth: Koganei, Tokyo, Japan
- Height: 1.77 m (5 ft 10 in)
- Position: Midfielder

Team information
- Current team: RB Omiya Ardija (first-team coach)

Youth career
- 2005–2007: FC Tokyo
- 2007–2011: Waseda University

Senior career*
| Years | Team | Apps | (Gls) |
| 2011–2013 | Pommern Greifswald | 28 | (11) |
| 2012 | → Arka Gdynia (loan) | 0 | (0) |
| 2012 | → Arka Gdynia II (loan) | 8 | (0) |
| 2013–2016 | Daugavpils | 79 | (33) |
| 2016–2017 | Jelgava | 24 | (2) |
| 2017 | Chonburi | 29 | (0) |
| 2018 | Jelgava | 19 | (0) |
| 2019 | Thai Honda | 12 | (0) |
| 2021–2022 | Jelgava | 20 | (2) |
| Total | | 219 | (48) |

International career
| 2004 | Japan U16 | | |
| 2005 | Japan U17 | | |
| 2006 | Japan U18 | | |
- Japan U19
- * Club domestic league appearances and goals

Ryotaro Nakano (中野 遼太郎, Nakano Ryotaro; born 13 June 1988) is a Japanese former professional footballer who played as a midfielder. He currently serves as the first-team coach for J2 League club RB Omiya Ardija.

== Club career ==
Nakano started his career with FC Tokyo while studying at the Waseda University. He moved to Germany in 2011 to join 6th division side Pommern Greifswald. He was loaned to Ekstraklasa side Arka Gdynia in 2012, but left less than five months later, without a first team appearance.

He moved to Latvia in 2013, joining Latvian First League side BFC Daugavpils. In his first season, Nakano managed a 1:1 goal ratio, scoring 26 goals in 26 games as his team were promoted to the Latvian Higher League. He earned a transfer to fellow Latvian side FK Jelgava in January 2016, and was included in the 2016 Latvian Higher League team of the season.

Despite his good performances, Nakano struggled with the freezing weather in Latvia, as temperatures dipped to −25° in the winter. He was offered a move to Thai League side Chonburi F.C. in 2017, an opportunity which he took.

== International career ==
Nakano has represented Japan at numerous youth levels, and was called up to represent a Japan XI against the Nepal national football team in 2016.

== Career statistics ==
Appearances and goals by club, season and competition
| Club | Season | League | | | National cup (Note: Includes Latvian Cup, Thai FA Cup) | | Continental | | Other | | Total | |
| Club | Season | Division | Apps | Goals | Apps | Goals | Apps | Goals | Apps | Goals | Apps | Goals |
|---|---|---|---|---|---|---|---|---|---|---|---|---|
| Pommern Greifswald | 2011–12 | NOFV-Oberliga Nord | 14 | 10 | 0 | 0 | — | | 0 | 0 | 14 | 10 |
| Pommern Greifswald | 2012–13 | NOFV-Oberliga Nord | 12 | 1 | 0 | 0 | — | | 0 | 0 | 12 | 1 |
| Pommern Greifswald | Total | | 28 | 11 | 0 | 0 | 0 | 0 | 0 | 0 | 28 | 11 |
| Arka Gdynia (loan) | 2011–12 | Ekstraklasa | 0 | 0 | 0 | 0 | — | | 0 | 0 | 0 | 0 |
| Arka Gdynia II (loan) | 2011–12 | IV liga Pomerania | 8 | 0 | — | | — | | 0 | 0 | 8 | 0 |
| Daugavpils | 2013 | Latvian First League | 26 | 26 | 0 | 0 | — | | 0 | 0 | 26 | 26 |
| Daugavpils | 2014 | Latvian First League | 31 | 5 | 1 | 1 | — | | 0 | 0 | 32 | 6 |
| Daugavpils | 2015 | Latvian First League | 22 | 2 | 2 | 0 | – | | 0 | 0 | 24 | 2 |
| Daugavpils | Total | | 79 | 33 | 3 | 1 | 0 | 0 | 0 | 0 | 82 | 34 |
| Jelgava | 2016 | Latvian First League | 24 | 2 | 3 | 0 | 6 (Note: Appearances in the UEFA Europa League) | 0 | 0 | 0 | 33 | 2 |
| Chonburi | 2017 | Thai League 1 | 29 | 0 | 0 | 0 | — | | 0 | 0 | 29 | 0 |
| Jelgava | 2018 | Latvian First League | 19 | 0 | 0 | 0 | — | | 0 | 0 | 19 | 0 |
| Thai Honda | 2019 | Thai League 2 | 12 | 0 | 1 | 0 | — | | 0 | 0 | 13 | 0 |
| Jelgava | 2021 | Latvian First League | 12 | 0 | 3 | 0 | — | | 0 | 0 | 15 | 0 |
| Jelgava | 2022 | Latvian First League | 8 | 2 | 2 | 0 | — | | 0 | 0 | 10 | 2 |
| Jelgava | Total | | 20 | 2 | 5 | 0 | 0 | 0 | 0 | 0 | 25 | 2 |
| Career total | | | 219 | 48 | 12 | 1 | 6 | 0 | 0 | 0 | 237 | 49 |

== Honours ==
Jelgava

- Latvian First League: 2022
- Latvian Cup: 2015–16
