= Andrejs Prohorenkovs =

Latvian footballer (1977–2025)

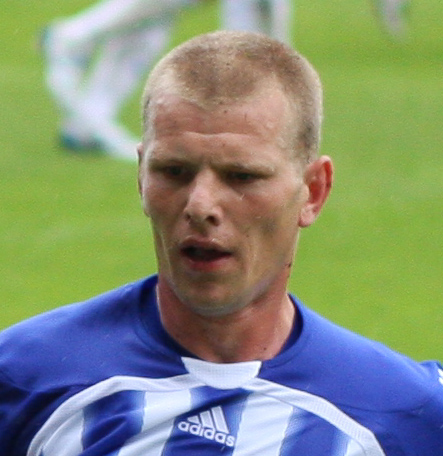
- Prohorenkovs playing for Liepājas Metalurgs

Personal information
- Date of birth: 5 February 1977
- Place of birth: Ogre, Latvian SSR, USSR
- Date of death: 1 May 2025 (aged 48)
- Height: 1.86 m (6 ft 1 in)
- Position: Midfielder

Senior career*
Years	Team	Apps	(Gls)
1994	FK Interskonto	20	(1)
1995	Olimpija Rīga	8	(0)
1996	FK Jūrnieks	25	(2)
1996–1998	Hutnik Warsaw	0	(0)
1998	Czuwaj Przemyśl	16	(6)
1998–1999	Ceramika Opoczno	0	(0)
1999–2001	Odra Opole	23	(6)
2000–2001	Górnik Zabrze	12	(1)
2001–2002	Maccabi Kiryat Gat	26	(7)
2002–2004	Maccabi Tel Aviv	45	(14)
2004	Dynamo Moscow	4	(0)
2004–2005	Maccabi Tel Aviv	16	(2)
2005	Dynamo Moscow	1	(0)
2006	Melnā Roze	12	(4)
2006	FK Jūrmala	9	(3)
2007	Racing de Ferrol	20	(0)
2007–2008	Ionikos	14	(3)
2008–2013	Liepājas Metalurgs	96	(13)
2013	FC Jūrmala	14	(0)
2014–2016	FK Ogre		

International career
2002–2007	Latvia	32	(4)

Managerial career
- 2014–2016: FK Ogre (player-manager)
- * Club domestic league appearances and goals

Andrejs Prohorenkovs (5 February 1977 – 1 May 2025) was a Latvian professional footballer who played as a midfielder.

== Club career ==
Prohorenkovs was born in Ogre on 5 February 1977. He started his career with Interskonto in the Latvian Higher League, and later played for Hutnik Warszawa, Odra Opole and Górnik Zabrze in Poland, Maccabi Kiryat Gat and Maccabi Tel Aviv in Israel, Dynamo Moscow in Russia, Melnā Roze and FK Jūrmala in Latvia, Racing de Ferrol in Spain, Ionikos in Greece, Liepājas Metalurgs, FC Jūrmala and FK Ogre in Latvia.

Prior to the 2014 Latvian First League (second tier) season Prohorenkovs was appointed the manager of FK Ogre, also remaining a player's role.

== International career ==
Prohorenkovs made 32 appearances for the Latvia national team scoring four goals between 2002 and 2007. He debuted in 2002, and played at the Euro 2004, making an assist for Māris Verpakovskis in Latvia's tournament opening goal against Czech Republic.

== Illness and death ==
In late 2024, Andrejs was diagnosed with cancer. He died on 1 May 2025, at the age of 48.

== Honours ==
Maccabi Tel Aviv

- Israeli Premier League: 2002–03
- Israel State Cup: 2004–05

Liepājas Metalurgs

- Latvian Higher League: 2009
