= UEFA Euro 2024 qualifying Group D =

Group D of UEFA Euro 2024 qualifying was one of the ten groups to decide which teams would qualify for the UEFA Euro 2024 final tournament in Germany. Group D consisted of five teams: Armenia, Croatia, Latvia, Turkey and Wales. The teams played against each other home-and-away in a round-robin format.

The top two teams, Turkey and Croatia, qualified directly for the final tournament. The participants of the qualifying play-offs were decided based on their performance in the 2022–23 UEFA Nations League.

== Standings ==
Pos	Team	Pld	W	D	L	GF	GA	GD	Pts	Qualification	(Turkey)	(Croatia)	(Wales)	(Armenia)	(Latvia)
1	Turkey	8	5	2	1	14	7	+7	17	Qualify for final tournament	—	0–2	2–0	1–1	4–0
2	Croatia	8	5	1	2	13	4	+9	16	Qualify for final tournament	0–1	—	1–1	1–0	5–0
3	Wales	8	3	3	2	10	10	0	12	Advance to play-offs via Nations League	1–1	2–1	—	2–4	1–0
4	Armenia	8	2	2	4	9	11	−2	8		1–2	0–1	1–1	—	2–1
5	Latvia	8	1	0	7	5	19	−14	3		2–3	0–2	0–2	2–0	—

Source: UEFA
Rules for classification: Qualification tiebreakers

== Matches ==
The fixture list was confirmed by UEFA on 10 October 2022, the day after the draw. Times are CET/CEST, (Note: CET (UTC+1) for matches until 25 March and from 29 October (matchday 1 and 9–10), and CEST (UTC+2) for matches from 26 March to 28 October 2023 (matchday 2–8).) as listed by UEFA (local times, if different, are in parentheses).

25 March 2023
18:00 (21:00 UTC+4)

Armenia	1–2	Turkey
Kabak 10' (o.g.)	Report	Kökçü 34'; Aktürkoğlu 64'

Vazgen Sargsyan Republican Stadium, Yerevan
Attendance: 14,125
Referee: José María Sánchez Martínez (Spain)
25 March 2023
20:45

Croatia	1–1	Wales
Kramarić 28'	Report	Broadhead 90+3'

Stadion Poljud, Split
Attendance: 33,474
Referee: João Pinheiro (Portugal)

28 March 2023
20:45 (21:45 UTC+3)

Turkey	0–2	Croatia
	Report	Kovačić 20', 45+4'

Bursa Metropolitan Stadium, Bursa
Attendance: 37,750
Referee: Andreas Ekberg (Sweden)
28 March 2023
20:45 (19:45 UTC+1)

Wales	1–0	Latvia
Moore 41'	Report

Cardiff City Stadium, Cardiff
Attendance: 32,806
Referee: Giorgi Kruashvili (Georgia)

16 June 2023
20:45 (21:45 UTC+3)

Latvia	2–3	Turkey
Emsis 51'; Tobers 90+4'	Report	Bardakcı 22'; Ünder 61'; Kahveci 90+5'

Skonto Stadium, Riga
Attendance: 6,287
Referee: Tamás Bognár (Hungary)
16 June 2023
20:45 (19:45 UTC+1)

Wales	2–4	Armenia
D. James 10'; Wilson 72'	Report	Zelarayán 19', 75'; Ranos 30', 66'

Cardiff City Stadium, Cardiff
Attendance: 32,774
Referee: Georgi Kabakov (Bulgaria)

19 June 2023
18:00 (20:00 UTC+4)

Armenia	2–1	Latvia
Tiknizyan 35'; Barseghyan 90+1' (pen.)	Report	Mkrtchyan 67' (o.g.)

Vazgen Sargsyan Republican Stadium, Yerevan
Attendance: 13,450
Referee: Peter Kráľovič (Slovakia)
19 June 2023
20:45 (21:45 UTC+3)

Turkey	2–0	Wales
Nayir 72'; Güler 80'	Report

Samsun 19 Mayıs Stadium, Samsun
Attendance: 28,766
Referee: Fabio Maresca (Italy)

8 September 2023
20:45

Croatia	5–0	Latvia
Petković 3', 44'; Ivanušec 13'; Kramarić 68'; Pašalić 78'	Report

Stadion Rujevica, Rijeka
Attendance: 8,152
Referee: Philip Farrugia (Malta)
8 September 2023
20:45 (21:45 UTC+3)

Turkey	1–1	Armenia
Yıldırım 88'	Report	Dashyan 49'

New Eskişehir Stadium, Eskişehir
Attendance: 31,740
Referee: Daniele Orsato (Italy)

11 September 2023
18:00 (20:00 UTC+4)

Armenia	0–1	Croatia
	Report	Kramarić 13'

Vazgen Sargsyan Republican Stadium, Yerevan
Attendance: 14,233
Referee: Clément Turpin (France)
11 September 2023
20:45 (21:45 UTC+3)

Latvia	0–2	Wales
	Report	Ramsey 29' (pen.); Brooks 90+6'

Skonto Stadium, Riga
Attendance: 6,464
Referee: Michal Ocenáš (Slovakia)

12 October 2023
18:00 (19:00 UTC+3)

Latvia	2–0	Armenia
J. Ikaunieks 39'; Balodis 68'	Report

Skonto Stadium, Riga
Attendance: 5,128
Referee: Rade Obrenovič (Slovenia)
12 October 2023
20:45

Croatia	0–1	Turkey
	Report	Yılmaz 30'

Opus Arena, Osijek
Attendance: 12,812
Referee: Anthony Taylor (England)

15 October 2023
20:45 (21:45 UTC+3)

Turkey	4–0	Latvia
Akgün 58'; Tosun 84', 90+2'; Aktürkoğlu 88'	Report

Konya Metropolitan Municipality Stadium, Konya
Attendance: 35,925
Referee: Enea Jorgji (Albania)
15 October 2023
20:45 (19:45 UTC+1)

Wales	2–1	Croatia
Wilson 47', 60'	Report	Pašalić 75'

Cardiff City Stadium, Cardiff
Attendance: 31,240
Referee: Davide Massa (Italy)

18 November 2023
15:00 (18:00 UTC+4)

Armenia	1–1	Wales
Zelarayán 5'	Report	Tiknizyan 45+2' (o.g.)

Vazgen Sargsyan Republican Stadium, Yerevan
Attendance: 14,271
Referee: Benoît Bastien (France)
18 November 2023
18:00 (19:00 UTC+2)

Latvia	0–2	Croatia
	Report	Majer 7'; Kramarić 16'

Skonto Stadium, Riga
Attendance: 6,747
Referee: Urs Schnyder (Switzerland)

21 November 2023
20:45

Croatia	1–0	Armenia
Budimir 43'	Report

Stadion Maksimir, Zagreb
Attendance: 20,398
Referee: Ivan Kružliak (Slovakia)
21 November 2023
20:45 (19:45 UTC±0)

Wales	1–1	Turkey
Williams 7'	Report	Yazıcı 70' (pen.)

Cardiff City Stadium, Cardiff
Attendance: 32,291
Referee: Matej Jug (Slovenia)

== Goalscorers ==
There were 51 goals scored in 20 matches, for an average of 2.55 goals per match.

4 goals

- (Croatia) Andrej Kramarić

3 goals

- (Armenia) Lucas Zelarayán
- (Wales) Harry Wilson

2 goals

- (Armenia) Grant-Leon Ranos
- (Croatia) Mateo Kovačić
- (Croatia) Mario Pašalić
- (Croatia) Bruno Petković
- (Turkey) Kerem Aktürkoğlu
- (Turkey) Cenk Tosun

1 goal

- (Armenia) Tigran Barseghyan
- (Armenia) Artak Dashyan
- (Armenia) Nair Tiknizyan
- (Croatia) Ante Budimir
- (Croatia) Luka Ivanušec
- (Croatia) Lovro Majer
- (Latvia) Daniels Balodis
- (Latvia) Eduards Emsis
- (Latvia) Jānis Ikaunieks
- (Latvia) Kristers Tobers
- (Turkey) Yunus Akgün
- (Turkey) Barış Alper Yılmaz
- (Turkey) Abdülkerim Bardakcı
- (Turkey) Arda Güler
- (Turkey) İrfan Kahveci
- (Turkey) Orkun Kökçü
- (Turkey) Umut Nayir
- (Turkey) Cengiz Ünder
- (Turkey) Yusuf Yazıcı
- (Turkey) Bertuğ Yıldırım
- (Wales) Nathan Broadhead
- (Wales) David Brooks
- (Wales) Daniel James
- (Wales) Kieffer Moore
- (Wales) Aaron Ramsey
- (Wales) Neco Williams

1 own goal

- (Armenia) Styopa Mkrtchyan (against Latvia)
- (Armenia) Nair Tiknizyan (against Wales)
- (Turkey) Ozan Kabak (against Armenia)

== Discipline ==
A player was automatically suspended for the next match for the following offences:

- Receiving a red card (red card suspensions could be extended for serious offences)
- Receiving three yellow cards in three different matches, as well as after fifth and any subsequent yellow card (yellow card suspensions could be carried forward to the play-offs, but not the finals or any other future international matches)

The following suspensions were served during the qualifying matches:

Team	Player	Offence(s)	Suspended for match(es)
Armenia	Hovhannes Hambardzumyan	(red card) vs Republic of Ireland in 2022–23 UEFA Nations League (27 September 2022)	vs Turkey (25 March 2023)
Armenia	Artak Dashyan	(yellow card) (yellow-red card) vs Republic of Ireland in 2022–23 UEFA Nations League (27 September 2022)	vs Turkey (25 March 2023)
Armenia	Varazdat Haroyan	(yellow card) vs Turkey (25 March 2023); (yellow card) vs Latvia (19 June 2023); (yellow card) vs Turkey (8 September 2023)	vs Croatia (11 September 2023)
Latvia	Eduards Emsis	(yellow card) (yellow-red card) vs Turkey (16 June 2023)	vs Armenia (19 June 2023)
Latvia	Eduards Emsis	(yellow card) vs Wales (11 September 2023); (yellow card) vs Armenia (12 October 2023); (yellow card) vs Turkey (15 October 2023)	vs Croatia (18 November 2023)
Latvia	Kristers Tobers	(yellow card) vs Turkey (16 June 2023); (yellow card) vs Armenia (19 June 2023); (yellow card) vs Wales (11 September 2023)	vs Armenia (12 October 2023)
Latvia	Mārcis Ošs	(yellow card) (yellow-red card) vs Armenia (12 October 2023)	vs Turkey (15 October 2023)
Turkey	Merih Demiral	(yellow card) vs Armenia (25 March 2023); (yellow card) vs Wales (19 June 2023); (yellow card) vs Armenia (8 September 2023)	vs Croatia (12 October 2023)
Wales	Kieffer Moore	(red card) vs Armenia (16 June 2023)	vs Turkey (19 June 2023) vs Latvia (11 September 2023)
Wales	Joe Morrell	(red card) vs Turkey (19 June 2023)	vs Latvia (11 September 2023) vs Croatia (15 October 2023)
