= Roberts Uldriķis =

Latvian footballer (born 1998)

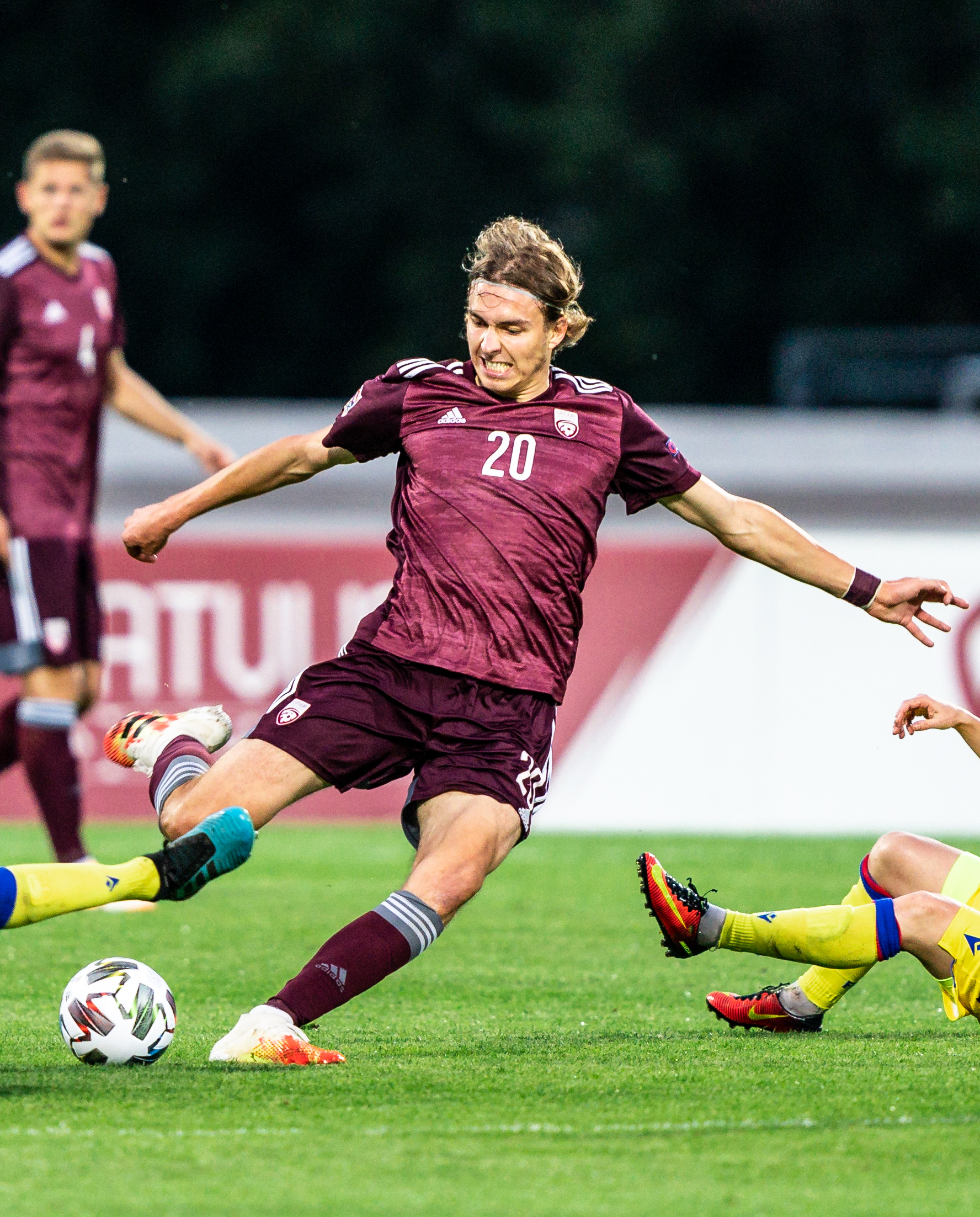
- Uldriķis with Latvia in 2020

Personal information
- Date of birth: 3 April 1998 (age 28)
- Place of birth: Riga, Latvia
- Height: 1.98 m (6 ft 6 in)
- Position: Forward

Team information
- Current team: Heerenveen
- Number: 28

Youth career
- Alberts
- JDFS Alberts
- 2011–2014: Skonto

Senior career*
Years	Team	Apps	(Gls)
2015–2016	Metta	37	(7)
2017–2018	RFS	35	(12)
2018–2021	Sion	72	(11)
2018	Sion II	2	(0)
2021–2024	Cambuur	81	(20)
2024–2025	Athens Kallithea	15	(1)
2025–2026	Arminia Bielefeld	25	(5)
2026–	Heerenveen	5	(0)

International career^{‡}
2014–2015	Latvia U17	12	(4)
2016	Latvia U18	4	(3)
2015–2016	Latvia U19	9	(2)
2017–2018	Latvia U21	8	(3)
2017–	Latvia	62	(8)
- * Club domestic league appearances and goals as of 18 January 2025 ‡ National team caps and goals as of 15 November 2026

Roberts Uldriķis (born 3 April 1998) is a Latvian professional footballer who plays as a forward for Eredivisie club Heerenveen and the Latvia national team.

== Club career ==
=== Early years ===
Uldriķis started playing football for JDFS Alberts and Skonto's academy before making a move to Latvian Higher League club Metta/Latvijas Universitāte in January 2015. He made his professional debut on 12 April 2015 in a game against his former side Skonto. By the close of the season, he had made 15 appearances in the top division, finding the net once. During the subsequent 2016 season, he featured in 22 league matches, showcasing his prowess by scoring six goals. He was also voted Young Player of the Round twice during the season.

In 2017, he moved to league rivals RFS, where he played 25 matches and scored five goals by season's end. The following year, he continued to impress, participating in ten games and netting seven times.

=== FC Sion ===
In July 2018, Uldriķis signed with Swiss Super League club FC Sion. He made his debut for the club on 22 July 2018 in a 2–1 loss against FC Lugano, entering the pitch as a substitute for Carlitos in the 64th minute. Throughout the season, he featured in 21 league matches for Sion, contributing with four goals. Additionally, he made two appearances for the reserve team in the third-tier Swiss Promotion League.

In the subsequent 2019–20 season, Uldriķis continued to make his mark in the highest Swiss league, participating in 24 matches and scoring four goals. This persisted into the 2020–21 season, where he once again played 24 league matches and found the net three times. The club's league season ended in a ninth-place finish, and having to go through relegation playoffs against FC Thun. Following a two-legged tie, Sion emerged victorious with a 6–4 aggregate score, securing their top-tier status. Uldriķis notably contributed by appearing as a substitute in both legs and scoring a crucial goal for a 4–0 lead in the first leg.

=== Cambuur ===
Uldriķis joined recently promoted Dutch Eredivisie club Cambuur on 31 August 2021. Injured at the start of the season, he made his debut for the club on 3 October 2021, replacing Tom Boere in the 62nd minute and scoring his first goal ten minutes later in a 3–1 victory against AZ.

In his first season at the club, he distinguished himself as the top scorer for the club with seven goals in 21 league matches. However, his second season saw a decline in goal-scoring output, managing only one goal in 28 appearances. Unfortunately, this downturn coincided with the team's relegation to the second-tier Eerste Divisie in the summer of 2023.

=== Athens Kallithea ===
On 3 July 2024, Uldriķis joined newly promoted Super League Greece club Athens Kallithea. He made his debut as a starter on 18 August, in the opening match of the season, playing in a 0–0 away draw against Levadiakos. Eight days later, he scored his first goal for the club in a 2–1 away defeat to Olympiacos. This proved to be his only goal for the club, which he scored across 18 competitive appearances before departing midway through the season.

=== Arminia Bielefeld ===
On 17 January 2025, Uldriķis joined German 3. Liga club Arminia Bielefeld on a permanent transfer. He made his debut the following day, coming on as a second-half substitute in a 2–0 home defeat to Energie Cottbus. Uldriķis earned his first start for the club on 26 January, marking the occasion with a 4–0 away victory over Borussia Dortmund II.

On 21 February, Uldriķis scored his first goal for Arminia and registered an assist in a 3–0 away win against 1860 Munich at the Grünwalder Stadion. However, just days later, his progress was halted by a serious knee injury sustained in Arminia's DFB-Pokal quarter-final victory over Bundesliga side Werder Bremen. Uldriķis, who had been introduced as a substitute, suffered a torn cruciate ligament, an injury that required surgery and sidelined him for a prolonged period.

== International career ==
Uldriķis made his Latvia national team debut on 12 June 2017 in a friendly game against rivals Estonia. He scored his first goal for Latvia on 9 June 2018 in a friendly against Azerbaijan.

== Career statistics ==
=== Club ===
As of match played 25 February 2025

Appearances and goals by club, season and competition
Club	Season	League			National cup (Note: Includes Latvian Football Cup, Swiss Cup, KNVB Cup, and DFB-Pokal)		Other		Total	
Club	Season	Division	Apps	Goals	Apps	Goals	Apps	Goals	Apps	Goals
Metta/LU	2015	Virslīga	15	1	1	0	—		16	1
Metta/LU	2016	Virslīga	22	6	1	1	—		23	7
Metta/LU	Total		37	7	2	1	—		39	8
RFS	2017	Virslīga	23	5	6	2	—		29	7
RFS	2018	Virslīga	10	7	1	2	—		11	9
RFS	Total		33	12	7	4	—		40	16
FC Sion	2018–19	Swiss Super League	21	4	2	0	—		23	4
FC Sion	2019–20	Swiss Super League	24	4	5	3	—		29	7
FC Sion	2020–21	Swiss Super League	24	3	2	0	2 (Note: Appearances in Swiss Super League relegation playoffs)	1	28	4
FC Sion	2021–22	Swiss Super League	3	0	1	1	—		4	1
FC Sion	Total		72	11	10	4	2	1	84	16
FC Sion II	2018–19	Swiss Promotion League	2	0	—		—		2	0
Cambuur	2021–22	Eredivisie	21	7	1	0	—		22	7
Cambuur	2022–23	Eredivisie	28	1	1	0	—		29	1
Cambuur	2023–24	Eerste Divisie	32	12	5	3	—		37	15
Cambuur	Total		81	20	7	3	—		88	23
Athens Kallithea	2024–25	Super League Greece	15	1	3	0	—		18	1
Arminia Bielefeld	2024–25	3. Liga	6	1	1	0	—		7	1
Career total			246	52	30	12	2	1	278	65

=== International ===
As of match played 17 November 2024

Appearances and goals by national team and year
National team	Year	Apps	Goals
Latvia	2017	3	0
Latvia	2018	5	1
Latvia	2019	6	0
Latvia	2020	5	0
Latvia	2021	13	3
Latvia	2022	5	2
Latvia	2023	10	1
Latvia	2024	8	1
Total		55	8

Scores and results list Latvia's goal tally first.

List of international goals scored by Roberts Uldriķis
No.	Date	Venue	Opponent	Score	Result	Competition
1.	9 June 2018	Daugava Stadium, Riga, Latvia	Azerbaijan	1–3	1–3	Friendly
2.	30 March 2021	Atatürk Olympic Stadium, Istanbul, Turkey	Turkey	2–3	3–3	2022 FIFA World Cup qualification
3.	4 June 2021	Daugava Stadium, Riga, Latvia	Lithuania	3–1	3–1	2020 Baltic Cup
4.	16 November 2021	Victoria Stadium, Gibraltar	Gibraltar	2–1	3–1	2022 FIFA World Cup qualification
5.	3 June 2022	Daugava Stadium, Riga, Latvia	Andorra	1–0	3–0	2022–23 Nations League
6.	3 June 2022	Daugava Stadium, Riga, Latvia	Andorra	2–0	3–0	2022–23 Nations League
7.	22 March 2023	Aviva Stadium, Dublin, Ireland	Republic of Ireland	1–2	2–3	Friendly
8.	17 November 2024	Skonto Stadium, Riga, Latvia	Armenia	1–1	1–2	2024–25 Nations League

== Honours ==
Arminia Bielefeld

- 3. Liga: 2024–25
