= 2017 Latvian Higher League =

Latvian Higher League
- Season: 2017
- Dates: 10 March – 4 November 2017
- Champions: Spartaks Jūrmala
- Champions League: Spartaks Jūrmala
- Europa League: Liepāja; Riga; Ventspils
- Matches: 84
- Goals: 200 (2.38 per match)
- Top goalscorer: Yevgeni Kozlov (13)
- Biggest home win: Ventspils 4–0 Spartaks; Riga 4–0 METTA/LU
- Biggest away win: Jelgava 0–3 Riga; Spartaks 0–3 Ventspils; METTA/LU 2–5 Liepāja
- Highest scoring: METTA/LU 2–5 Liepāja

The 2017 Latvian Higher League is the 26th season of top-tier football in Latvia. Spartaks Jūrmala are the defending champions, having won their first title in the previous season.

== Teams ==
Locations of the 2017 Latvian Higher League teams

The bottom-placed team from the 2016 season, BFC Daugavpils, were directly relegated to the 2017 Latvian First League. They were replaced by Babīte, champions of the 2016 Latvian First League.

The seventh-placed team from the 2016 season, FS METTA/LU, retained their top-flight spot for the 2017 season by defeating 2016 First League runners-up, AFA Olaine in the play-offs.

Babīte was removed from the league on 22 June 2017 after the Latvian Football Federation received a notice from UEFA's Betting Fraud Detection System for 6 separate games involving Babīte. All the results for Babīte games were invalidated and do not count for the standings.

Club	Location	Stadium	Capacity
Babīte	Piņķi	Piņķu stadions	500
Jelgava	Jelgava	Olympic Sports Center of Zemgale	1,560
Liepāja	Liepāja	Daugava Stadium	5,008
Metta/LU	Riga	Hanzas vidusskolas laukums	2,000
RFS	Riga	Stadions Arkādija	1,000
Riga	Riga	Skonto Stadium	8,207
Spartaks Jūrmala	Jūrmala	Slokas Stadium	2,800
Ventspils	Ventspils	Ventspils Olimpiskais Stadions	3,044

Source: Scoresway

=== Kits manufacturer and sponsors ===
Club	Kit manufacturer	Sponsor
SK Babīte	Joma	
FK Jelgava	Nike	Igate
FK Liepāja	Adidas	Mogo
FS Metta/LU	Nike	
Riga FC	Jako	
Rīgas Futbola skola	Nike	LNK Group
FK Spartaks Jūrmala	Nike	Hanseatisches Fußball Kontor
FK Ventspils	Adidas	VK Tranzīts

== League table ==
Pos	Team	Pld	W	D	L	GF	GA	GD	Pts	Qualification or relegation
1	Spartaks Jūrmala (C)	24	14	4	6	36	26	+10	46	Qualification for the Champions League first qualifying round
2	Liepāja	24	11	4	9	32	25	+7	37 (Note: Liepāja is ahead of Riga on head-to-head goal difference: Liepāja +1, Riga -1.)	Qualification for the Europa League first qualifying round (Note: Liepāja qualified for the Europa League first qualifying round by winning the 2017 Latvian Football Cup.)
3	Riga	24	10	7	7	28	20	+8	37	Qualification for the Europa League first qualifying round
4	Ventspils	24	9	8	7	32	22	+10	35 (Note: Ventspils is ahead of RFS on overall goal difference.)	Qualification for the Europa League first qualifying round
5	RFS	24	11	2	11	29	31	−2	35	
6	Jelgava	24	8	5	11	22	30	−8	29	
7	METTA/LU (O)	24	3	6	15	21	46	−25	15	Qualification for the relegation play-offs
8	Babīte (D)	0	0	0	0	0	0	0	0	Excluded from league (Note: Babīte were excluded from the league for match fixing.)

Source: Virslīga (in Latvian), Soccerway
Rules for classification: 1) Points; 2) Head-to-head points; 3) Head-to-head goal difference; 4) Goal difference; 5) Goals scored; 6) Fair-play ranking; 7) Play-off.
(C) Champions; (D) Disqualified; (O) Play-off winners

== Results ==
Each team will play the other seven teams home-and-away twice, for a total of 28 games each.

First half of the season
Home \ Away	BAB	JEL	LIE	MLU	RFS	RIG	SPJ	VEN
Babīte	—	—	—	—	—	—	—	—
Jelgava	—	—	1–2	2–0	1–1	0–3	1–2	1–0
Liepāja	—	3–0	—	0–1	0–1	0–1	1–3	1–0
METTA/LU	—	1–3	1–3	—	3–1	0–0	2–4	1–1
RFS	—	0–1	2–0	3–2	—	0–1	2–1	4–2
Riga	—	1–0	0–2	2–2	3–0	—	1–1	0–0
Spartaks Jūrmala	—	1–1	1–1	1–0	2–0	2–0	—	0–0
Ventspils	—	1–2	1–1	2–0	1–0	0–0	4–0	—

Source: Virslīga (in Latvian)
Legend: Blue = home team win; Yellow = draw; Red = away team win.

Second half of the season
Home \ Away	BAB	JEL	LIE	MLU	RFS	RIG	SPJ	VEN
Babīte	—	—	—	—	—	—	—	—
Jelgava	—	—	1–3	1–1	1–0	1–2	1–2	0–1
Liepāja	—	0–1	—	1–0	2–0	2–1	1–2	1–1
METTA/LU	—	0–0	2–5	—	2–0	0–2	0–2	2–2
RFS	—	3–0	1–2	1–0	—	1–1	1–0	2–4
Riga	—	2–2	2–1	4–0	0–1	—	0–1	0–2
Spartaks Jūrmala	—	0–1	2–0	3–1	1–3	2–0	—	0–3
Ventspils	—	1–0	0–0	3–0	1–2	0–2	2–3	—

Updated to match(es) played on 28 October 2017. Source: Virslīga (in Latvian)
Legend: Blue = home team win; Yellow = draw; Red = away team win.

== Relegation play-offs ==
The seventh-placed side faced the runners-up of the 2017 Latvian First League in a two-legged play-off, with the winner being awarded a spot in the 2018 Higher League competition.

16 November 2017 1st leg	Progress/AFA Olaine	1–1	METTA/LU	Olaine
	Asgarov 21'	Report	Emsis 7'

20 November 2017 2nd leg	METTA/LU	3–1 (4–2 agg.)	Progress/AFA Olaine	Riga
	Emsis 3'; Fjodorovs 12', 32'	Report	Asgarov 90'	Stadium: Hanzas vidusskolas laukums

== Season statistics ==
=== Top scorers ===
As of 4 November 2017

Rank	Player	Club	Goals
1	(Russia) Yevgeni Kozlov	Spartaks Jūrmala	13
2	(Latvia) Artūrs Karašausks	Liepāja	12
3	(Nigeria) Adeleke Akinyemi	Ventspils	10
4	(Nigeria) Tosin Aiyegun	Ventspils	9
5	(Estonia) Bogdan Vaštšuk	Riga	8
6	(Latvia) Mārcis Ošs	Jelgava	7
6	(Latvia) Daniils Ulimbaševs	RFS	7
8	(Latvia) Kristaps Grebis	Liepāja	6
8	(Latvia) Ģirts Karlsons	Liepāja	6
8	(Latvia) Edgars Gauračs	Spartaks Jūrmala	6
