= Jānis Ikaunieks (footballer) =

Latvian footballer (born 1995)

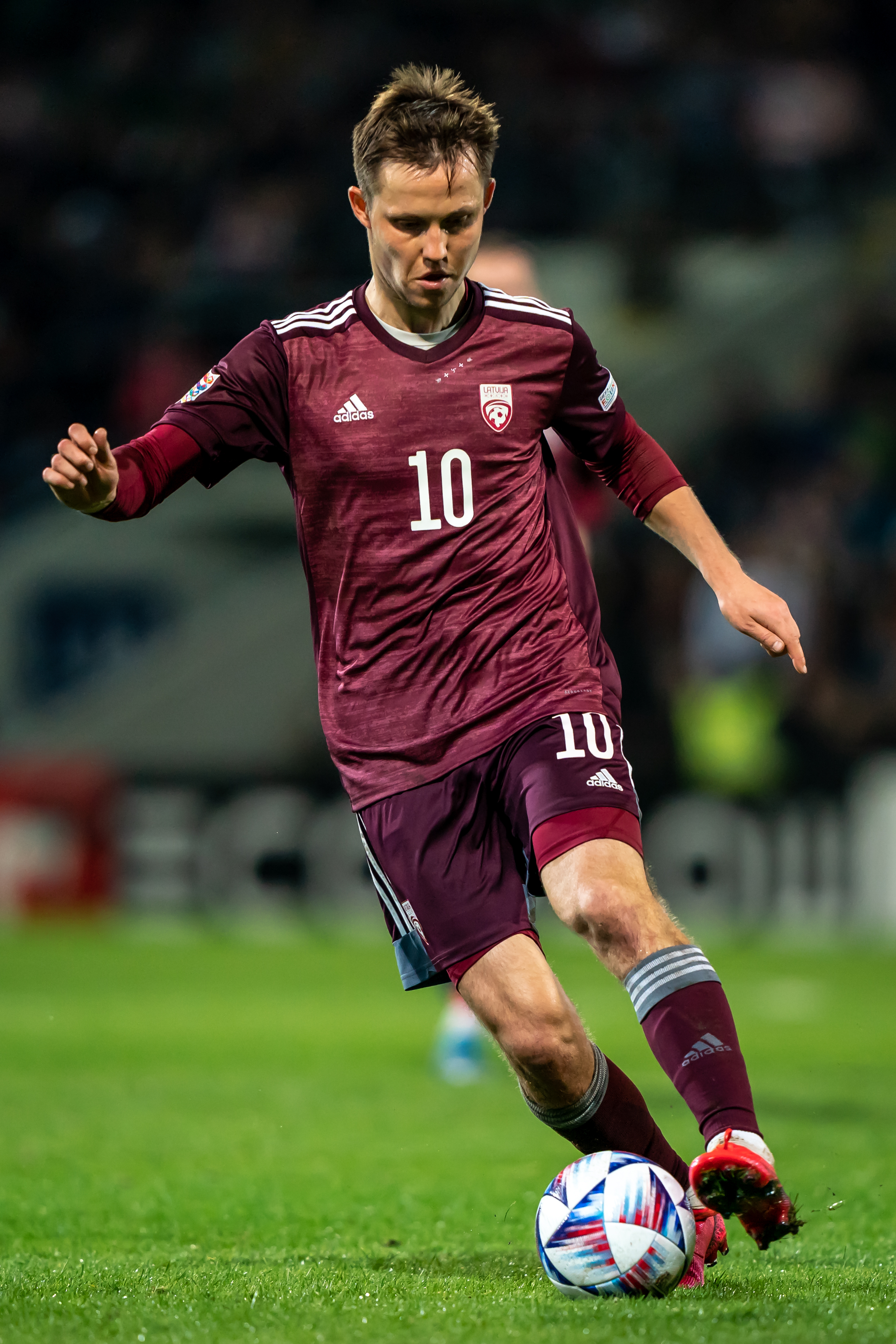
- Ikaunieks with Latvia in 2022

Personal information
- Date of birth: 16 February 1995 (age 31)
- Place of birth: Kuldīga, Latvia
- Height: 1.83 m (6 ft 0 in)
- Position: Attacking midfielder

Team information
- Current team: RFS
- Number: 10

Youth career
- 2005–2013: Liepājas Metalurgs

Senior career*
Years	Team	Apps	(Gls)
2012–2013	Liepājas Metalurgs II	21	(11)
2013–2014	Liepājas Metalurgs	19	(3)
2014–2015	Liepāja	32	(23)
2015–2018	Metz	12	(0)
2015–2017	Metz II	14	(4)
2017	→ AEL (loan)	10	(1)
2017–2018	→ Liepāja (loan)	6	(0)
2018–2019	Liepāja	47	(16)
2020	Strømsgodset	6	(0)
2020	RFS	14	(7)
2021–2022	KuPS	31	(11)
2023–	RFS	103	(57)

International career^{‡}
2011	Latvia U17	2	(0)
2011	Latvia U18	1	(1)
2013	Latvia U19	2	(0)
2014	Latvia U21	3	(0)
2014–	Latvia	74	(12)
- * Club domestic league appearances and goals as of 12 November 2026 ‡ National team caps and goals as of 15 November 2026

Jānis Ikaunieks (born 16 February 1995) is a Latvian professional footballer who plays as an attacking midfielder for Latvian Higher League club RFS and the Latvia national team.

== Club career ==
=== Liepājas Metalurgs ===
Ikaunieks was born in Kuldīga. As a youth player, he played for the youth teams of Liepājas Metalurgs. Ikaunieks scored 11 goals in 20 matches in the 2012 First League season, contributing to Liepājas Metalurgs II winning the championship.

Having been promoted to the first team in 2013, Ikaunieks debuted on 7 April in the Higher League in a 2–1 defeat against FK Daugava. During his professional debut season, he played 19 league matches and scored three goals. The club was dissolved at the end of the season due to financial difficulties, and Ikaunieks and other players transferred to its successor, the newly established FK Liepāja.

=== FK Liepāja ===
Starting the season as a nominal substitute, Ikaunieks was promoted to the first team and named the Higher League player of the month in May. On 11 June 2014, Ikaunieks scored four goals in a 7–0 victory over FC Jūrmala. Overall, he scored 23 goals in 32 league matches and became the second highest scorer of the league behind Vladislavs Gutkovskis from Skonto. In August 2014, Ikaunieks went on trial with the Croatian Prva HNL champions Dinamo Zagreb. In September, he was named player of the month for the second time in the season. One month later in October, explicit interest in the player was reported from Ajax, Metz, VfB Stuttgart and Udinese Calcio. On 5 December 2014, Ikaunieks was named the best midfielder of the season and was simultaneously voted as the best player of the 2014 Higher League.

=== Metz ===
On 23 December 2014, Metz chairman Bernard Serin confirmed that Ikaunieks would join the Ligue 1 team on a four-year contract. The transfer for an undisclosed fee was officially affirmed on 7 January 2015. Ikaunieks debuted for Metz' first team on 20 January 2015, coming on as a substitute in the Coupe de France 1/16 finals match victory over US Avranches. He made his Ligue 1 debut in a goalless draw against Nice on 31 January.

==== AEL (loan) ====
In December 2016, Ikaunieks joined Greek Super League team AEL on a six-month loan. He debuted in a 2–1 victory over Veria on 14 January 2017. On 18 January, against Veria once again, he scored his only goal for AEL in a match that ended 1–1. Reportedly, there was no buy option in the loan agreement and thus he returned to Metz at the end of the season.

==== FK Liepāja (loan) ====
On 15 June 2017, it was announced that Ikaunieks had returned to FK Liepāja while on loan from Metz. He made his first match on 18 June, in a 1–0 victory over Ventspils. He only managed to make a total of seven matches, six in the league and in the cup final in which Liepāja lifted the trophy against Riga FC, due to being out for two months after suffering from a metatarsal fracture. After the conclusion of his loan deal, Ikaunieks joined Liepāja on a permanent basis.

Ikaunieks instantly became an important asset in the 2018 Higher League season, scoring nine goals in 17 matches as well as being involved in the assistance of three goals. Once again being unlucky with injuries, he suffered from a shoulder injury at the end of August and was out for about three months.

Upon returning for the 2019 Higher League season, Ikaunieks scored seven goals in 24 matches, as well as scoring one goal in a Europa League qualifying match against Dinamo Minsk.

=== Strømsgodset ===
On 11 February 2020, Ikaunieks signed for Norwegian Eliteserien team Strømsgodset. He debuted on 17 June against IK Start in a 2–2 draw. On 1 August, having spent only a few months with the team and having only played six matches, Ikaunieks and Strømsgodset agreed on mutual termination of the contract.

=== Later career ===
On 6 August 2020, Ikaunieks returned to Latvia and signed for Higher League club Rīgas FS. He made his debut on 8 August against his old club Liepāja in a 3–0 victory. On 12 August, Ikaunieks scored his first goal in a 4–0 victory over Jelgava.

On 22 February 2021, Ikaunieks signed a two-year contract with Finnish Veikkausliiga team KuPS.

== International career ==
Ikaunieks was a member of Latvian youth national football teams that ranged from U18, U19, until U21.

He debuted for the Latvian senior squad on 13 October 2014, playing the entire 90 minutes in a 1–1 UEFA Euro 2016 qualifying draw against Turkey.

It was later calculated that Ikaunieks had repeated the record of Māris Verpakovskis who debuted in 1999, being exactly 19 years, 7 months and 25 days old. On 29 March 2016, Ikaunieks scored his first two goals for his country in a 5–0 friendly victory over Gibraltar.

== Personal life ==
His elder brother Dāvis is also a professional footballer who plays for the same team.

== Career statistics ==
=== Club ===
As of match played 12 December 2024

Appearances and goals by club, season and competition
Club	Season	League			National cup (Note: Includes Latvian Cup, Coupe de France, Finnish Cup)		League cup (Note: Includes Finnish League Cup)		Continental		Other		Total	
Club	Season	Division	Apps	Goals	Apps	Goals	Apps	Goals	Apps	Goals	Apps	Goals	Apps	Goals
Liepājas Metalurgs II	2012	Latvian First League	20	11	–		—		—		—		20	11
Liepājas Metalurgs II	2013	Latvian First League	1	0	–		—		—		—		1	0
Liepājas Metalurgs II	Total		21	11	–		–		–		–		21	11
Liepājas Metalurgs	2013	Virslīga	19	3	3	0	–		1 (Note: Appearance in UEFA Europa League)	0	—		23	3
FK Liepāja	2014	Virslīga	32	23	3	1	–		—		—		35	24
Metz II	2014–15	CFA	6	2	–		—		—		—		6	2
Metz II	2015–16	CFA	3	2	–		—		—		—		3	2
Metz II	2016–17	CFA	5	0	–		—		—		—		5	0
Metz II	Total		14	4	–		–		–		–		14	4
Metz	2014–15	Ligue 1	4	0	2	0	0	0	—		—		6	0
Metz	2015–16	Ligue 2	8	0	1	0	0	0	—		—		9	0
Metz	2016–17	Ligue 1	0	0	0	0	0	0	—		—		0	0
Metz	Total		12	0	3	0	0	0	–		—		15	0
AEL	2016–17	Super League Greece	10	1	0	0	–		—		—		10	1
FK Liepāja	2017	Virslīga	6	0	1	0	–		0	0	—		7	0
FK Liepāja	2018	Virslīga	17	9	1	0	–		1	0	—		19	9
FK Liepāja	2019	Virslīga	24	7	1	0	–		1	1	—		26	8
FK Liepāja	Total		47	16	3	0	–		2	1	—		52	17
Strømsgodset	2020	Eliteserien	6	0	–		—		—		—		6	0
FK RFS	2020	Virslīga	14	7	3	1	–		1	0	—		18	8
KuPS	2021	Veikkausliiga	8	3	2	1	0	0	6 (Note: Appearances in UEFA Europa Conference League)	1	–		16	5
KuPS	2022	Veikkausliiga	23	8	3	1	3	5	5	2	–		34	16
KuPS	Total		31	11	5	2	3	5	11	3	–		50	21
FK RFS	2023	Virslīga	22	15	3	2	–		4	1	–		29	18
FK RFS	2024	Virslīga	24	16	3	1	–		14 (Note: Four appearances and two goals in UEFA Champions League, ten appearances and seven goals in UEFA Europa League)	9	1 (Note: Appearance in Latvian Supercup)	0	42	26
FK RFS	Total		46	31	6	3	–		18	10	1	0	71	44
Career total			246	107	26	7	3	5	33	14	1	0	309	133

=== International ===
As of 17 November 2025

Appearances and goals by national team and year
National team	Year	Apps	Goals
Latvia	2014	3	0
Latvia	2015	4	0
Latvia	2016	7	2
Latvia	2017	4	0
Latvia	2018	3	1
Latvia	2019	5	0
Latvia	2020	7	3
Latvia	2021	6	1
Latvia	2022	9	4
Latvia	2023	2	0
Total		50	11

Scores and results list Latvia's goal tally first, score column indicates score after each Ikaunieks' goal.

List of international goals scored by Jānis Ikaunieks
No.	Date	Venue	Opponent	Score	Result	Competition
1	29 March 2016	Victoria Stadium, Gibraltar	Gibraltar	1–0	5–0	Friendly
2	29 March 2016	Victoria Stadium, Gibraltar	Gibraltar	5–0	5–0	Friendly
3	2 June 2018	Daugava Stadium, Riga, Latvia	Estonia	1–0	1–0	2018 Baltic Cup
4	10 October 2020	Tórsvøllur, Tórshavn, Faroe Islands	Faroe Islands	1–0	1–1	2020–21 UEFA Nations League D
5	17 November 2020	Estadi Nacional, Andorra la Vella, Andorra	Andorra	2–0	5–0	2020–21 UEFA Nations League D
6	17 November 2020	Estadi Nacional, Andorra la Vella, Andorra	Andorra	3–0	5–0	2020–21 UEFA Nations League D
7	24 March 2021	Skonto Stadium, Riga, Latvia	Montenegro	1–0	1–2	2022 FIFA World Cup qualification
8	3 June 2022	Daugava Stadium, Riga, Latvia	Andorra	3–0	3–0	2022–23 UEFA Nations League D
9	10 June 2022	Zimbru Stadium, Chișinău, Moldova	Moldova	2–1	4–2	2022–23 UEFA Nations League D
10	10 June 2022	Zimbru Stadium, Chișinău, Moldova	Moldova	4–2	4–2	2022–23 UEFA Nations League D
11	22 September 2022	Daugava Stadium, Riga, Latvia	Moldova	1–2	1–2	2022–23 UEFA Nations League D
12	12 October 2023	Skonto Stadium, Riga, Latvia	Armenia	1–0	2–0	UEFA Euro 2024 qualifying

== Honours ==
Liepājas Metalurgs II

- Latvian First League: 2012

FK Liepāja

- Latvian Football Cup: 2017

RFS

- Latvian Higher League: 2026

Latvia

- Baltic Cup: 2018; runner-up: 2022

Individual

- Latvian Higher League Player of the Year: 2014
- Latvian Higher League Midfielder of the Year: 2014
- Veikkausliiga Team of the Year: 2022
