= 2016 Latvian Higher League =

Season of the Latvian Premier League

Latvian Higher League
- Season: 2016
- Champions: Spartaks Jūrmala; 1st title
- Relegated: BFC Daugavpils
- Champions League: Spartaks Jūrmala
- Europa League: Jelgava; Ventspils
- Matches: 112
- Goals: 252 (2.25 per match)
- Top goalscorer: Ģirts Karlsons (17 goals)
- Biggest home win: Jelgava 4–0 Rīgas Futbola skola (12 March 2016); Spartaks Jūrmala 5–1 Ventspils (10 June 2016)
- Biggest away win: BFC Daugavpils 0–5 Ventspils (16 April 2016)
- Highest scoring: Jelgava 4–3 Ventspils (22 June 2016); Liepāja 4–3 Spartaks Jūrmala (24 July 2016)

The 2016 Latvian Higher League was the 25th season of top-tier football in Latvia. FK Liepāja were the defending champions. The season began on 11 March 2016 and ended on 5 November 2016; the relegation play-offs took place on 9 and 13 November 2016.

== Teams ==
FB Gulbene were excluded from the previous season due to suspicion of match-fixing. 2015 Latvian First League winners FC Caramba/Dinamo were promoted to the league and before the season changed their name to Riga FC.

Skonto FC did not obtain a license to play in the 2016 Higher League. Skonto appealed the decision, but the appeal was denied. Since 2015 Latvian First League runners-up Valmiera Glass FK/BSS turned down the opportunity to be promoted to the Higher League, third-placed Rīgas Futbola skola (RFS) was promoted instead.

=== Stadiums and locations ===
Locations of the 2016 Latvian Higher League teams

Club	Location	Stadium	Capacity
BFC Daugavpils	Daugavpils	Celtnieks Stadium	1,980
FK Jelgava	Jelgava	Zemgales Olimpiskais Sporta Centrs	1,560
FK Liepāja	Liepāja	Daugava Stadium	5,000
FS Metta/LU	Riga	Hanzas vidusskolas futbola laukums	500
Riga FC	Riga	Skonto Stadium	9,500
FK RFS	Riga	Stadions Arkādija	500
FK Spartaks Jūrmala	Jūrmala	Slokas Stadium	2,500
FK Ventspils	Ventspils	Olimpiskais Stadium	3,200

=== Kits manufacturer and sponsors ===
Club	Kit manufacturer	Sponsor
BFC Daugavpils	Adidas	Intergaz
FK Jelgava	Nike	Igate
FK Liepāja	Adidas	Mogo
FS Metta/LU	Nike	
Riga FC	Jako	
FK RFS	Nike	LNK Group
FK Spartaks Jūrmala	Nike	Hanseatisches Fußball Kontor
FK Ventspils	Adidas	VK Tranzīts

== League table ==
Pos	Team	Pld	W	D	L	GF	GA	GD	Pts	Qualification or relegation
1	Spartaks Jūrmala (C)	28	17	4	7	46	22	+24	55	Qualification for the Champions League second qualifying round
2	Jelgava	28	16	3	9	37	24	+13	51 (Note: Head-to-head record; Ventspils–Jelgava 1–0, Jelgava–Ventspils 4–3, Jelgava–Ventspils 2–0, Ventspils–Jelgava 1–2.)	Qualification for the Europa League first qualifying round (Note: Since the winner of the 2016–17 Latvian Football Cup (Ventspils) qualified for European competition based on their league position, the spot awarded to the Cup winner (Europa League first qualifying round) was passed to the next best-placed team (in this case, to the fourth-placed team).)
3	Ventspils	28	15	6	7	47	28	+19	51	Qualification for the Europa League first qualifying round
4	Liepāja	28	12	6	10	38	31	+7	42	Qualification for the Europa League first qualifying round
5	Riga	28	8	12	8	28	24	+4	36	
6	FK RFS	28	9	8	11	22	31	−9	35	
7	METTA/LU (O)	28	8	6	14	32	47	−15	30	Qualification for the relegation play-offs
8	BFC Daugavpils (R)	28	2	5	21	13	56	−43	11	Relegation to the Latvian First League

Source: Virslĩga (in Latvian), UEFA, Soccerway
Rules for classification: 1) Points; 2) Head-to-head points; 3) Head-to-head goal difference; 4) Goal difference; 5) Goals scored; 6) Fairplay ranking; 7) Play-off.
(C) Champions; (O) Play-off winners; (R) Relegated

=== Relegation play-offs ===
The 7th-placed side, FS METTA/LU, faced AFA Olaine, runners-up of the 2016 Latvian First League in a two-legged play-off, with the winner being awarded a spot in the 2017 Higher League competition.

==== First leg ====
9 November 2016
19:00 EET

AFA Olaine	1–1	METTA/LU
Asgarov 85'	Report	Uldriķis 52'

Olaines pilsētas stadions, Olaine
Attendance: 150
Referee: Mareks Ķere

==== Second leg ====
13 November 2016
15:00 EET

METTA/LU	1–0	AFA Olaine
Šibass 10'	Report

Hanzas vidusskolas futbola laukums, Riga
Attendance: 250
Referee: Aleksandrs Anufrijevs

METTA/LU won 2–1 on aggregate and retained their place in the 2017 Higher League.

== Results ==
First half of the season
Home \ Away	BFC	JEL	LIE	MLU	RIG	RFS	SPJ	VEN
BFC Daugavpils		0–0	0–3	0–1	0–2	1–0	0–2	0–5
Jelgava	3–1		0–1	2–0	2–1	4–0	0–1	4–3
Liepāja	1–0	0–1		3–0	3–0	3–1	1–2	2–3
METTA/LU	2–1	3–0	0–2		1–0	1–1	0–1	1–1
Riga	2–0	1–1	0–0	2–1		0–0	0–0	1–1
Rīgas Futbola skola	0–0	1–0	1–0	3–2	1–1		0–2	1–2
Spartaks Jūrmala	3–0	3–0	0–1	4–1	1–0	2–0		5–1
Ventspils	3–0	1–0	2–2	2–0	1–1	0–1	2–1	

Source: Virslīga 2016 (in Latvian)
Legend: Blue = home team win; Yellow = draw; Red = away team win.

Second half of the season
Home \ Away	BFC	JEL	LIE	MLU	RIG	RFS	SPJ	VEN
BFC Daugavpils		0–1	0–1	3–3	2–2	0–1	2–1	0–4
Jelgava	2–0		3–2	1–2	1–0	2–0	2–0	2–0
Liepāja	1–0	1–3		2–3	2–2	0–1	4–3	0–0
METTA/LU	2–2	0–1	3–1		1–1	1–1	1–3	2–1
Riga	3–0	1–0	0–1	2–1		1–0	1–1	1–2
Rīgas Futbola skola	2–0	1–0	1–1	3–0	0–0		0–2	0–3
Spartaks Jūrmala	4–1	0–0	0–0	2–0	0–3 (Note: The Round 28 match between Spartaks Jūrmala and Riga was cancelled due to a snow laden pitch. On 7 November 2016, the LFF awarded a 3–0 win to Riga.)	2–1		0–1
Ventspils	2–0	1–2	2–0	2–0	1–0	1–1	0–1	

Source: Virslīga 2016 (in Latvian)
Legend: Blue = home team win; Yellow = draw; Red = away team win.

== Season statistics ==
=== Top scorers ===
As of 29 October 2016

Rank	Player	Club	Goals
1	(Latvia) Ģirts Karlsons	Ventspils	17
2	(Belarus) Dzmitry Platonaw	Spartaks	11
3	(Latvia) Jevgēņijs Kazačoks	Spartaks	10
4	(Latvia) Eduards Tīdenbergs	Ventspils	8
5	(Latvia) Edgars Gauračs	Liepāja/Spartaks	7
5	(Latvia) Gļebs Kļuškins	Jelgava	7
7	(Latvia) Andrejs Kovaļovs	Jelgava	6
7	(Latvia) Oskars Kļava	Liepāja	6
7	(Latvia) Roberts Uldriķis	FS Metta/LU	6
7	(Latvia) Raivis Jurkovskis	FK RFS	6
7	(Russia) Yevgeni Kozlov	Spartaks	6

Updated to match(es) played on 29 October 2016.
Source:UEFA
