= 2014 Latvian Higher League =

Latvian football league season for the highest division

Latvian Higher League
- Season: 2014
- Champions: FK Ventspils
- Relegated: FC Jūrmala
- Champions League: FK Ventspils
- Europa League: Skonto FC; FK Jelgava; FK Spartaks Jūrmala
- Matches played: 162
- Goals scored: 505 (3.12 per match)
- Top goalscorer: Vladislavs Gutkovskis (28)
- Biggest home win: Liepāja 7-0 FC Jūrmala
- Biggest away win: FC Jūrmala 0-6 Ventspils; FC Jūrmala 0-6 Daugava Rīga
- Highest scoring: Daugava Daugavpils 5-3 Liepāja
- Longest winning run: 12 matches: Ventspils
- Longest unbeaten run: 12 matches: Skonto; Ventspils
- Longest winless run: 23 matches: FC Jūrmala
- Longest losing run: 11 matches: FC Jūrmala

The 2014 Latvian Higher League was the 23rd season of top-tier football in Latvia. FK Ventspils are the defending champions. The season started on 21 March 2014. Initially, Skonto Riga and Daugava Daugavpils, the second and third teams from the previous season, were denied a license to participate and the league began with eight clubs. However, their appeals against this were successful and the league was restored to ten clubs.

== Teams ==
This year the league had ten participants.

=== Stadiums and locations ===
Locations of the 2014 Latvian Higher League teams

Club	Location	Stadium	Capacity
BFC Daugavpils	Daugavpils	Celtnieks Stadium	3,980
FC Daugava	Daugavpils	Daugava Stadium	4,100
FK Daugava Rīga	Riga	Daugava Stadium	5,000
FK Jelgava	Jelgava	Zemgales Olimpiskais Sporta Centrs	2,200
FC Jūrmala	Jūrmala	Slokas Stadium	5,000
FK Liepāja	Liepāja	Daugava Stadium	6,000
FS Metta/LU	Riga	Stadions Arkādija	500
Skonto FC	Riga	Skonto Stadium	10,000
FK Spartaks Jūrmala	Jūrmala	Slokas Stadium	5,000
FK Ventspils	Ventspils	Olimpiskais Stadium	3,200

== League table ==
Pos	Team	Pld	W	D	L	GF	GA	GD	Pts	Qualification or relegation
1	Ventspils (C)	36	26	5	5	73	20	+53	83	Qualification for Champions League second qualifying round
2	Skonto	36	25	1	10	77	34	+43	71 (Note: Skonto FC have had 5 point(s) deducted)	Qualification for Europa League first qualifying round
3	Jelgava	36	20	10	6	57	27	+30	70	Qualification for Europa League first qualifying round
4	Liepāja	36	21	3	12	72	45	+27	66	
5	Daugava Daugavpils (R)	36	19	8	9	53	39	+14	65	Relegation to Latvian First League
6	Spartaks Jūrmala	36	14	9	13	38	32	+6	51	Qualification for Europa League first qualifying round (Note: Liepāja would have qualified for the Europa League first qualifying round, but failed to obtain a UEFA license as they were affiliated with the Latvian Football Federation for less than three years after reforming from the dissolved Liepājas Metalurgs. As a result, the berth was given to Spartaks Jūrmala, as Daugava Daugavpils also failed to obtain a UEFA license.)
7	Daugava Rīga (R)	36	13	4	19	48	64	−16	43	Relegation to Latvian First League
8	BFC Daugavpils	36	8	5	23	30	65	−35	29	
9	METTA/LU (O)	36	3	7	26	26	69	−43	16	Qualification for relegation play-offs
10	FC Jūrmala (R)	36	2	6	28	29	108	−79	7 (Note: FC Jūrmala have had 5 point(s) deducted)	Relegation to Latvian First League

Source: Virslīga 2014
Rules for classification: 1st points; 2nd head-to-head points; 3rd head-to-head goal difference; 4th overall wins; 5th goal difference; 6th goals scored. The winners of the 2014–15 Latvian Football Cup competition will qualify for the first qualifying round of the 2015–16 UEFA Europa League.
(C) Champions; (O) Play-off winners; (R) Relegated

=== Relegation play-offs ===
The 9th-placed side faced the runners-up of the 2014 Latvian First League in a two-legged play-off, with the winner being awarded a spot in the 2015 Higher League competition.

12 November 2014
19:00

FS METTA/LU	1–0	Rēzeknes BJSS
Kalniņš 44'

Hanzas vidusskolas laukums, Riga

16 November 2014
14:00

Rēzeknes BJSS	1–5	FS METTA/LU
Aguls 14'		Loginovs 26', 55'; Milašēvičs 29', 72'; Pallo 80'

RPD Sporta pārvaldes stadions, Rezekne

FS METTA/LU won 6–1 on aggregate.

== Results ==
First half of the season
Home \ Away	BFC	DGD	JEL	FCJ	DGR	LIE	MLU	SKO	SPJ	VEN
BFC Daugavpils		0–1	2–3	1–1	3–2	1–1	1–1	0–2	1–3	0–3
FC Daugava Daugavpils	2–1		1–2	1–0	1–0	5–3	1–0	0–4	3–3	0–3
Jelgava	1–0	1–1		5–0	4–1	3–0	1–1	0–3	0–0	1–2
FC Jūrmala	1–2	2–3	1–3		1–1	2–3	0–3	0–5	0–1	0–6
FK Daugava Rīga	1–0	0–1	0–3	3–0		4–0	1–0	1–6	0–2	0–4
Liepāja	2–1	0–3	2–1	7–0	1–0		2–1	1–0	2–0	2–0
METTA/LU	1–0	0–1	1–1	2–4	0–2	1–4		1–2	2–2	0–2
Skonto FC	3–1	2–1	1–1	1–0	5–1	2–0	3–1		2–1	2–0
Spartaks Jūrmala	0–1	0–0	0–1	1–1	1–0	2–0	4–1	0–2		1–0
Ventspils	0–1	3–0	0–0	3–1	2–0	3–2	2–0	1–0	1–0	

Source: Virslīga 2014
Legend: Blue = home team win; Yellow = draw; Red = away team win.

Second half of the season
Home \ Away	BFC	DGD	JEL	FCJ	DGR	LIE	MLU	SKO	SPJ	VEN
BFC Daugavpils		0–2	0–2	4–2	0–1	0–4	4–1	1–0	1–0	0–1
FC Daugava Daugavpils	5–0		1–0	1–0	2–2	3–1	2–1	0–1	1–0	1–1
Jelgava	2–0	1–0		2–1	1–1	1–0	1–1	0–1	0–0	1–0
FC Jūrmala	1–1	1–1	0–2		0–6	0–1	1–0	1–7	1–2	0–6
FK Daugava Rīga	4–2	1–4	1–3	3–1		2–4	2–0	1–2	2–1	0–3
Liepāja	5–0	3–2	2–1	6–0	1–2		2–0	3–0	3–0	1–1
METTA/LU	1–1	0–1	0–3	1–1	1–2	0–2		0–3	2–1	0–3
Skonto FC	2–0	1–0	0–3	4–3	4–1	1–2	3–1		0–1	2–4
Spartaks Jūrmala	2–0	0–0	1–1	4–1	1–0	0–0	2–0	0–2		1–2
Ventspils	2–0	4–0	2–0	6–1	0–0	1–0	2–1	2–1	1–0	

Source: Virslīga 2014
Legend: Blue = home team win; Yellow = draw; Red = away team win.

== Season statistics ==
=== Top scorers ===
As of 8 November 2014

Rank	Player	Club	Goals
1	(Latvia) Vladislavs Gutkovskis	Skonto	28
2	(Latvia) Jānis Ikaunieks	Liepāja	23
3	(Latvia) Vladislavs Kozlovs	Jelgava	15
4	(Latvia) Edgars Gauračs	Spartaks	14
5	(Latvia) Jevgēņijs Kosmačovs	Daugava	12
5	(Latvia) Kristaps Grebis	Liepāja	12
5	(Lithuania) Mantas Savėnas	Daugava Rīga	12
5	(Albania) Ndue Mujeci	Ventspils	12
9	(Nigeria) Ahmed Abdultaofik	Ventspils	11
10	(Turkmenistan) Ruslan Mingazow	Skonto	9

== Player of the Month ==
Month	Player	Club
March/April	(Latvia) Jurijs Žigajevs	FK Ventspils
May	(Latvia) Jānis Ikaunieks	FK Liepāja
June	(Latvia) Edgars Gauračs	JPFS/FK Spartaks
July	(Latvia) Edgars Gauračs	JPFS/FK Spartaks
August	(Latvia) Kaspars Ikstens	FK Jelgava
September	(Latvia) Jānis Ikaunieks	FK Liepāja
October/November	(Latvia) Vladislavs Gutkovskis	Skonto FC

== Manager of the Month ==
Month	Manager	Club
March/April	(Latvia) Jurģis Pučinsks	FK Ventspils
May	(Latvia) Vladimirs Beškarevs	FK Jelgava
June	(Georgia (country)) Tamaz Pertia	Skonto FC
July	(Ukraine) Roman Pylypchuk	JPFS/FK Spartaks
August	(Latvia) Vitālijs Astafjevs	FK Jelgava
September	(Latvia) Viktors Dobrecovs	FK Liepāja
October/November	(Latvia) Jurģis Pučinsks	FK Ventspils
