= 2018 Latvian First League =

Latvian football league season for 2nd division

komanda.lv Pirmā līga
- Season: 2018

The 2018 Latvian First League (referred to as the komanda.lv Pirmā līga for sponsorship reasons) started on 21 April 2018 and ended on 21 October 2018.

== League table ==
=== First round ===
Pos	Team	Pld	W	D	L	GF	GA	GD	Pts	Qualification or relegation
1	BFC Daugavpils/Progress	16	13	1	2	95	11	+84	40	Qualification for second round
2	SK Super Nova	16	11	2	3	51	15	+36	35	Qualification for second round
3	FK Tukums 2000/TSS	16	14	0	2	42	9	+33	42	Qualification for second round
4	Rēzeknes FA/BJSS	16	10	3	3	58	19	+39	33	Qualification for second round
5	FK Auda	16	7	1	8	29	45	−16	22	
6	RTU FC/Skonto Academy	16	8	3	5	59	23	+36	27	
7	FK Smiltene/BJSS	16	8	1	7	40	42	−2	25	
8	JDFS Alberts	15	6	4	5	29	21	+8	22	
9	Preiļu BJSS	17	3	0	14	19	69	−50	9	
10	Balvu Sporta centrs	17	2	3	12	15	92	−77	9	
11	FK Staiceles Bebri	16	2	3	11	11	61	−50	9	Relegation to Second League
12	Grobiņas SC	16	2	1	13	24	64	−40	7	Relegation to Second League

Updated to match(es) played on 27 August 2018. Source: online.lff.lv
Rules for classification: 1) points; 2) goal difference; 3) number of goals scored.

=== Second round ===
Pos	Team	Pld	W	D	L	GF	GA	GD	Pts	Promotion
1	BFC Daugavpils/Progress	3	3	0	0	11	2	+9	9	Promotion to the Virslīga
2	SK Super Nova	3	2	0	1	9	7	+2	6	Qualification for promotion/relegation play-offs
3	FK Tukums 2000/TSS	3	1	0	2	4	6	−2	3	
4	Rēzeknes FA/BJSS	3	0	0	3	5	14	−9	0	

Updated to match(es) played on 8 April 2019. Source: online.lff.lv
Rules for classification: 1) points; 2) goal difference; 3) number of goals scored.
