= 2017 Latvian First League =

Latvian football league season for 2nd division

komanda.lv Pirmā līga
- Season: 2017
- Champions: Valmiera Glass VIA
- Promoted: Valmiera Glass VIA
- Relegated: Preiļu BJSS; FK Staiceles Bebri

The 2017 Latvian First League (referred to as the komanda.lv Pirmā līga for sponsorship reasons) started on 14 April 2017 and ended on 28 October 2017.

== League table ==
Pos	Team	Pld	W	D	L	GF	GA	GD	Pts	Promotion or relegation
1	Valmiera Glass VIA	22	18	4	0	75	21	+54	58	Promotion to Higher League
2	FK Progress/AFA Olaine	22	15	3	4	47	14	+33	48	Qualification for promotion/relegation play-offs
3	BFC Daugavpils	22	15	2	5	58	14	+44	47	
4	Grobiņas SC	22	14	2	6	62	41	+21	44	
5	FK Tukums 2000/TSS	22	10	3	9	36	39	−3	33	
6	Rēzeknes FA/BJSS	22	8	4	10	40	47	−7	28	
7	JDFS Alberts	22	8	4	10	23	32	−9	28	
8	FK Smiltene/BJSS	22	7	5	10	28	48	−20	26	
9	RTU FC/Skonto Academy	22	8	0	14	42	52	−10	24	
10	FK Auda	22	6	5	11	36	45	−9	23	
11	Preiļu BJSS	22	4	2	16	26	67	−41	14	Relegation to Second League
12	FK Staiceles Bebri	22	1	2	19	14	67	−53	5	Relegation to Second League

Source: LFF nacionālās sacensības; RSSSF
Rules for classification: 1) points; 2) goal difference; 3) number of goals scored.
