= Dāvis Ikaunieks =

Latvian footballer

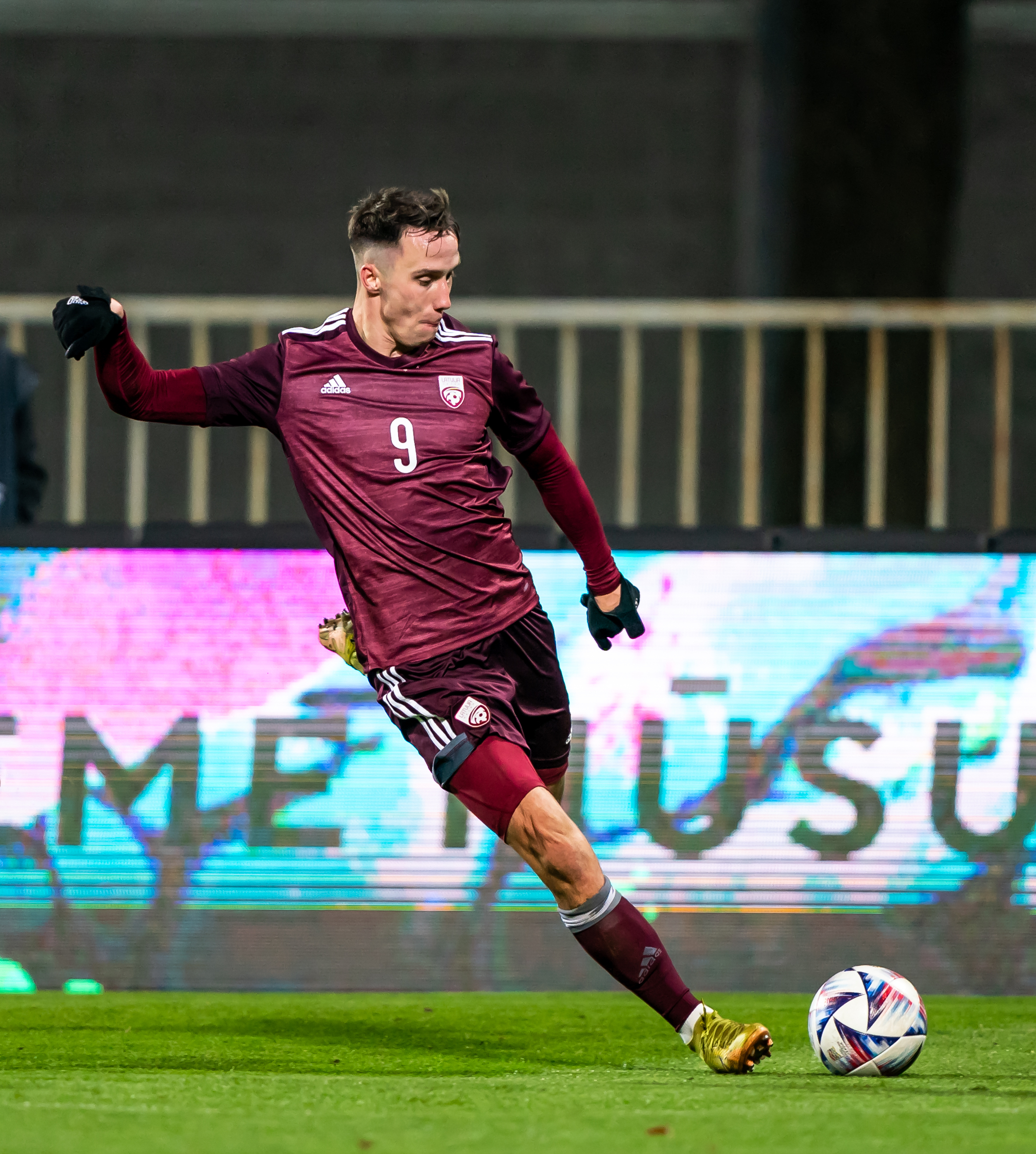
- Ikaunieks with Latvia in 2022

Personal information
- Date of birth: 7 January 1994 (age 32)
- Place of birth: Kuldīga, Latvia
- Height: 1.85 m (6 ft 1 in)
- Position: Striker

Team information
- Current team: FA Šiauliai
- Number: 19

Youth career
- 2005–2012: Liepājas Metalurgs

Senior career*
Years	Team	Apps	(Gls)
2012–2014	Liepājas Metalurgs	17	(2)
2014–2017	Liepāja	68	(26)
2016	→ Vysočina Jihlava (loan)	16	(3)
2017–2018	Vysočina Jihlava	41	(16)
2018–2024	Jablonec	43	(3)
2019	→ RFS (loan)	12	(6)
2020	→ Fastav Zlín (loan)	2	(0)
2020	→ Mladá Boleslav (loan)	10	(0)
2021	→ Liepāja (loan)	14	(3)
2024	Šiauliai	34	(18)
2025	DPMM	14	(14)
2025	RFS	7	(1)
2026	Kauno Žalgiris	18	(5)
2026–	FA Šiauliai	10	(1)

International career^{‡}
2009	Latvia U16	1	(0)
2010–2011	Latvia U17	20	(9)
2012	Latvia U19	15	(4)
2014–2016	Latvia U21	15	(3)
2016–	Latvia	43	(6)
- * Club domestic league appearances and goals as of 7 September 2026 ‡ National team caps and goals as of 12 March 2024

Dāvis Ikaunieks (born 7 January 1994) is a Latvian professional footballer who plays primarily as a striker for FA Šiauliai and the Latvia national team.

== Club career ==
On 20 June 2018, Ikaunieks signed a three-year deal with Czech First League team Jablonec. On 4 October, he made his 2018–19 UEFA Europa League debut in a 2–2 draw against Dynamo Kyiv.

After spending half a season on loan at FK RFS in Latvia, at the end of 2019, he went on loan to Fastav Zlín.

After scoring 18 league goals in 34 appearances with FA Šiauliai in 2024, Ikaunieks moved to DPMM of Brunei who are playing in the Singapore Premier League in January 2025. He dispatched his first goal in a 2–3 defeat at home to Balestier Khalsa on 7 February. He managed a hat-trick against the same opponent in a 3–4 away victory on 11 May. He scored 14 goals in as many matches in the league, helping DPMM to a nine-match unbeaten streak at the end of the season.

Ikaunieks returned to Latvia in June 2025, signing for FK RFS. In January 2026, he moved to FK Kauno Žalgiris of Lithuania.

== International career ==
Ikaunieks was called up to the Latvia national team where he made his debut on 1 June 2016 in a 2–1 win over Lithuania. He then scored his first international goal on 2 September the same year in a 3–1 win against Estonia.

During the 2022 FIFA World Cup qualification match against Turkey, Ikaunieks equalised the match at 3–3 in the 79th minute.

== Personal life ==
His younger brother Jānis is also a professional footballer who plays for FK RFS.

== Career statistics ==
Scores and results list Latvia's goal tally first.

No	Date	Venue	Opponent	Score	Result	Competition
1.	2 September 2016	Skonto Stadium, Riga, Latvia	Luxembourg	1–0	3–1	Friendly
2.	12 June 2017	Skonto Stadium, Riga, Latvia	Estonia	1–0	1–2	Friendly
3.	10 October 2017	Skonto Stadium, Riga, Latvia	Andorra	1–0	4–0	2018 FIFA World Cup qualification
4.	13 November 2017	Adem Jashari Olympic Stadium, Mitrovica, Kosovo	Kosovo	2–1	3–4	Friendly
5.	30 March 2021	Atatürk Olympic Stadium, Istanbul, Turkey	Turkey	3–3	3–3	2022 FIFA World Cup qualification
6.	10 June 2021	A. Le Coq Arena, Tallinn, Estonia	Estonia	1–2	1–2	2020 Baltic Cup

== Honours ==
=== Club ===
Liepājas Metalurgs

- Latvian First League: 2012

FK Liepāja

- Latvian Higher League: 2015

FK RFS

- Latvian Football Cup: 2019

=== International ===
Latvia

- Baltic Cup: 2016
- Baltic Cup runner up: 2022

=== Individual ===
- Latvian Higher League top scorer: 2015 (15 goals)
- Latvian Footballer of the Year: 2018
