= 2015 Latvian First League =

Latvian football league season for 2nd division

komanda.lv Pirmā līga
- Season: 2015
- Champions: FC Caramba/Dinamo
- Promoted: FC Caramba/Dinamo
- Relegated: Preiļu BJSS
- Matches played: 240
- Goals scored: 960 (4 per match)
- Top goalscorer: Niks Savaļnieks (31 goals); Verners Apiņš (31 goals)
- Biggest home win: Caramba/Dinamo 11–0 Tukums 2000 (1 May 2015)
- Biggest away win: Staiceles Bebri 0–9 Caramba/Dinamo (15 August 2015)
- Highest scoring: Caramba/Dinamo 11–0 Tukums 2000 (1 May 2015); Smiltene/BJSS 3–8 Tukums 2000 (30 May 2015); Caramba/Dinamo 10–1 Jēkabpils/JSC (17 October 2015)
- Longest winning run: 19 games Caramba/Dinamo
- Longest unbeaten run: 30 games Caramba/Dinamo
- Longest winless run: 10 games Saldus/Brocēni
- Longest losing run: 7 games Preiļu BJSS
- All statistics correct as of 8 November 2015.

The 2015 Latvian First League (referred to as the komanda.lv Pirmā līga for sponsorship reasons) started on 29 March 2015 and ended on 7 November 2015.

== Changes from last season ==
=== Team changes ===
The following teams have changed league since the 2014 season.

==== To First League ====
Promoted from Second League

- FC Caramba/Dinamo
- FK Staiceles Bebri

From Higher League B team championship (dublieru čempionāts)

- JDFS Alberts

==== From First League ====
Relegated to Second League

- FK Pļaviņas DM

Promoted to Higher League

- FB Gulbene

To Higher League B team championship (dublieru čempionāts)

- SFK United as FB Gulbene B team

== Team overview ==
=== Stadia and locations ===
Locations of teams in the 2015 Latvian First League

Team	Stadium
1625 Liepāja	Daugava Stadium (Liepāja) (reserve pitch)
Alberts	Rīgas 49. vidusskolas stadions Stadions Energoautomātika
Auda	Audas stadions
Caramba/Dinamo	NSB Arkādija; Daugava Stadium (Riga)
Jēkabpils/JSC	Jēkabpils SC stadions
Ogre	Ogres ģimnāzijas stadions Ogres stadions
Olaine	Olaines pilsētas stadions
Preiļu BJSS	Preiļu mākslīgā seguma futbola laukums Preiļu novada BJSS stadions
Rēzeknes FA	RPD Sporta pārvaldes stadions
Rīgas Futbola skola	NSB Arkādija
Salaspils	Ogres ģimnāzijas stadions Iecavas novada stadions
Saldus/Brocēni	Brocēnu SC stadions
Smiltene/BJSS	Smiltenes pilsētas stadions
Staiceles Bebri	LFF treniņu centrs Staicele
Tukums 2000	Tukuma mākslīgā seguma futbola laukums Tukuma pilsētas stadions
Valmiera Glass	Vidzemes Olimpiskais centrs J. Daliņa stadions

== League table ==
Pos	Team	Pld	W	D	L	GF	GA	GD	Pts	Promotion or relegation
1	FC Caramba/Dinamo (C, P)	30	27	3	0	142	14	+128	84	Promotion to Higher League
2	Valmiera Glass FK/BSS	30	24	3	3	89	33	+56	75	Qualification for promotion/relegation play-offs
3	FK Rīgas Futbola skola	30	24	2	4	94	25	+69	74	
4	FK 1625 Liepāja	30	18	7	5	92	39	+53	61	
5	FK Auda	30	13	9	8	62	43	+19	48	
6	Rēzeknes FA	30	14	3	13	56	66	−10	45	
7	FK Tukums 2000 TSS	30	13	3	14	64	70	−6	42	
8	AFA Olaine	30	9	9	12	41	49	−8	36	
9	JDFS Alberts	30	11	2	17	35	56	−21	35	
10	FK Ogre	30	9	6	15	52	70	−18	33	
11	FK Jēkabpils/JSC	30	9	3	18	46	99	−53	30	
12	Salaspils	30	8	6	16	31	57	−26	30	
13	FK Staiceles Bebri	30	8	3	19	42	84	−42	27	
14	JFK Saldus/Brocēnu NBJSS	30	7	3	20	22	59	−37	24	
15	FK Smiltene/BJSS	30	6	4	20	52	96	−44	22	
16	Preiļu BJSS (R)	30	4	6	20	40	100	−60	18	Relegation to Second League

Source: rsssf.com
Rules for classification: 1) points; 2) goal difference; 3) number of goals scored.
(C) Champions; (P) Promoted; (R) Relegated

=== Positions by round ===
The table lists the positions of teams after each week of matches. In order to preserve chronological evolvements, any postponed matches are not included to the round at which they were originally scheduled, but added to the full round they were played immediately afterwards. For example, if a match is scheduled for matchday 13, but then postponed and played between days 16 and 17, it will be added to the standings for day 17.

Team ╲ Round	1	2	3	4	5	6	7	8	9	10	11	12	13	14	15	16	17	18	19	20	21	22	23	24	25	26	27	28	29	30
Caramba/Dinamo	4	4	3	3	2	2	2	2	2	1	2	2	1	1	1	1	1	1	1	1	1	1	1	1	1	1	1	1	1	1
Valmiera Glass	1	2	2	2	1	1	1	1	1	2	1	1	3	3	3	3	3	3	3	3	2	2	2	2	2	2	2	3	3	2
Rīgas Futbola skola	6	1	1	1	3	3	3	3	4	4	3	3	2	2	2	2	2	2	2	2	3	3	3	3	3	3	3	2	2	3
1625 Liepāja	3	8	6	4	5	4	4	4	3	3	4	4	4	4	4	4	4	4	4	4	4	4	4	4	4	4	4	4	4	4
Auda	9	3	4	6	6	8	6	7	7	7	6	6	6	5	5	5	5	5	5	5	5	5	5	5	5	5	5	5	5	5
Rēzeknes FA	5	5	5	5	4	5	7	6	6	6	7	7	7	7	7	7	7	7	7	7	7	6	6	6	6	6	6	6	6	6
Tukums 2000	14	6	9	9	11	9	10	9	9	9	9	8	8	8	9	9	8	8	9	10	9	10	8	8	8	8	7	7	7	7
Olaine	12	10	11	12	13	10	9	8	8	8	8	9	10	10	10	10	9	9	8	9	8	9	9	9	9	9	10	9	9	8
Alberts	2	7	7	7	8	7	5	5	5	5	5	5	5	6	6	6	6	6	6	6	6	7	7	7	7	7	8	8	8	9
Ogre	11	9	10	10	9	11	11	12	11	11	12	13	12	12	14	14	13	12	12	12	12	11	12	12	12	11	11	10	10	10
Jēkabpils/JSC	13	16	16	16	14	14	13	14	12	10	10	10	9	9	8	8	10	10	10	8	10	8	10	10	10	12	12	12	12	11
Salaspils	15	13	13	14	12	13	14	13	14	14	11	11	13	13	11	12	11	11	11	11	11	12	11	11	11	10	9	11	11	12
Staiceles Bebri	16	15	15	13	15	15	15	15	15	16	16	16	14	15	15	15	15	16	16	15	15	14	14	15	15	15	15	13	14	13
Saldus/Brocēni	10	12	8	11	10	12	12	11	13	13	15	15	16	14	12	13	14	14	14	14	13	13	13	13	14	14	14	15	13	14
Smiltene/BJSS	8	11	12	8	7	6	8	10	10	12	13	12	11	11	13	11	12	13	13	13	14	15	15	14	13	13	13	14	15	15
Preiļu BJSS	7	14	14	15	16	16	16	16	16	15	14	14	15	16	16	16	16	15	15	16	16	16	16	16	16	16	16	16	16	16

== Top scorers ==
As of 15 November 2015

Rank	Player	Club	Goals
1	(Latvia) Niks Savaļnieks	Valmiera Glass	31
1	(Latvia) Verners Apiņš	Caramba/Dinamo	31
3	(Latvia) Elvis Teremko	Smiltene/BJSS; Valmiera Glass	22
3	(Azerbaijan) Vugar Asgarov	1625 Liepāja	22
5	(Latvia) Andrejs Perepļotkins	Caramba/Dinamo	21
6	(Latvia) Vsevolods Čamkins	Rīgas Futbola skola	20
7	(Latvia) Kristaps Blanks	Tukums 2000; Caramba/Dinamo	19
7	(Japan) Takeo Ogawa	Caramba/Dinamo	19
9	(Latvia) Guntars Silagailis	Rēzeknes FA	18
9	(Latvia) Maksims Vasiļjevs	Rīgas Futbola skola	18
