= 2015 Latvian Higher League =

Latvian football league season for the highest division

Latvian Higher League
- Season: 2015
- Champions: Liepāja
- Champions League: Liepāja
- Matches: 55
- Goals: 123 (2.24 per match)
- Top goalscorer: Dāvis Ikaunieks (15)
- Biggest home win: Skonto 4-0 FS Metta/LU (5 June 2015)
- Biggest away win: FS Metta/LU 1-5 Skonto (10 August 2015)
- Highest scoring: FS Metta/LU 1-5 Skonto (10 August 2015)
- Longest winning run: 3 matches Skonto; FK Liepāja; FK Jelgava
- Longest unbeaten run: 13 matches Ventspils
- Longest winless run: 7 matches FS Metta/LU
- Longest losing run: 4 matches FS Metta/LU

The 2015 Latvian Higher League is the 24th season of top-tier football in Latvia. FK Ventspils are the defending champions. The season started on 13 March 2015.

== Teams ==
FC Jūrmala relegated at the end of last season, and was replaced by FB Gulbene, which returned to the highest level after two years. Because FC Daugava did not obtain a license to play in the 2015 Higher League, and FK Daugava was dissolved before the beginning of the new season, the league started with 8 participants. On 3 June 2015, FB Gulbene was expelled from the top league and their results expunged on suspicion of match-fixing.

=== Stadiums and locations ===
Locations of the 2015 Latvian Higher League teams

| Club | Location | Stadium | Capacity |
|---|---|---|---|
| BFC Daugavpils | Daugavpils | Celtnieks Stadium | 3,980 |
| FB Gulbene | Gulbene | Gulbenes Sporta Centrs | 1,500 |
| FK Jelgava | Jelgava | Zemgales Olimpiskais Sporta Centrs | 2,200 |
| FK Liepāja | Liepāja | Daugava Stadium | 6,000 |
| FS Metta/LU | Riga | Stadions Arkādija | 500 |
| Skonto FC | Riga | Skonto Stadium | 10,000 |
| FK Spartaks Jūrmala | Jūrmala | Slokas Stadium | 5,000 |
| FK Ventspils | Ventspils | Olimpiskais Stadium | 3,200 |

=== Kits manufacturer and sponsors ===
| Club | Kit manufacturer | Sponsor |
|---|---|---|
| BFC Daugavpils | Adidas | Intergaz |
| FB Gulbene | Jako | |
| FK Jelgava | Nike | Igate |
| FK Liepāja | Adidas | |
| FS Metta/LU | Nike | |
| Skonto FC | Jako | SA Football Agency |
| FK Spartaks Jūrmala | Nike | Hanseatisches Fußball Kontor |
| FK Ventspils | Adidas | VK Tranzīts |

== League table ==
| Pos | Team | Pld | W | D | L | GF | GA | GD | Pts | Qualification or relegation |
|---|---|---|---|---|---|---|---|---|---|---|
| 1 | Liepāja (C) | 24 | 15 | 7 | 2 | 48 | 23 | +25 | 52 | Qualification for the Champions League second qualifying round |
| 2 | Skonto (R) | 24 | 13 | 6 | 5 | 43 | 23 | +20 | 45 | Relegation to the Latvian First League (Note: Skonto failed to obtain a licence to play at the Higher League.) |
| 3 | Ventspils | 24 | 11 | 10 | 3 | 39 | 16 | +23 | 43 | Qualification for the Europa League first qualifying round (Note: Jelgava qualified for the Europa League first qualifying round by winning the 2015–16 Latvian Football Cup) |
| 4 | Jelgava | 24 | 11 | 8 | 5 | 26 | 18 | +8 | 41 | Qualification for the Europa League first qualifying round |
| 5 | Spartaks Jūrmala | 24 | 5 | 6 | 13 | 20 | 36 | −16 | 21 | Qualification for the Europa League first qualifying round |
| 6 | BFC Daugavpils | 24 | 2 | 8 | 14 | 14 | 37 | −23 | 14 | |
| 7 | METTA/LU (O) | 24 | 3 | 3 | 18 | 19 | 56 | −37 | 12 | Qualification for the relegation play-offs |
| — | Gulbene (D, R) | 0 | 0 | 0 | 0 | 0 | 0 | 0 | 0 | Exclusion (Note: On 3 June 2015, Gulbene were excluded from the top league and their results were expunged after suspicion of match-fixing.) |

Source: UEFA Soccerway
Rules for classification: 1) Points; 2) Head-to-head points; 3) Head-to-head goal difference; 4) Matches won; 5) Goal difference; 6) Goals scored; 7) Fairplay ranking; 8) Play-off.
(C) Champions; (D) Disqualified; (O) Play-off winners; (R) Relegated

=== Relegation play-offs ===
The 7th-placed side will face the runners-up of the 2015 Latvian First League in a two-legged play-off, with the winner being awarded a spot in the 2016 Higher League competition.

21 November 2015
15:00

| Valmiera Glass FK/BSS | 1–3 | FS METTA/LU |
|---|---|---|
| Bruno Bērziņš 48' | | Ingars Stuglis 50'; Gatis Kalniņš 70'; Roberts Uldriķis 81' |

Jānis Daliņš stadium, Valmiera

25 November 2015
19:00

| FS METTA/LU | 6-2 | Valmiera Glass FK/BSS |
|---|---|---|
| Roberts Uldriķis 18', 49'; Gatis Kalniņš 37', 90+2'; Armands Pētersons 55'; Rendijs Šibass 75' | | Jānis Lapss 70'; Valts Jaunzems 77' |

Hanzas vidusskolas laukums, Riga

FS METTA/LU won 9–3 on aggregate.

== Results ==
First half of the season
| Home \ Away | BFC | JEL | LIE | MLU | SKO | SPJ | VEN |
|---|---|---|---|---|---|---|---|
| BFC Daugavpils | | 0–1 | 1–1 | 2–0 | 0–0 | 0–1 | 1–1 |
| Jelgava | 2–0 | | 1–2 | 1–0 | 0–0 | 1–1 | 0–0 |
| Liepāja | 1–1 | 2–1 | | 3–1 | 3–2 | 0–0 | 0–0 |
| METTA/LU | 2–1 | 1–1 | 1–4 | | 0–1 | 1–2 | 0–3 |
| Skonto FC | 4–1 | 1–0 | 1–0 | 4–0 | | 2–1 | 1–1 |
| Spartaks Jūrmala | 1–1 | 0–0 | 1–2 | 2–2 | 1–0 | | 0–2 |
| Ventspils | 3–0 | 0–0 | 3–3 | 2–0 | 0–0 | 2–0 | |

Source: Virslīga 2015 (in Latvian)
Legend: Blue = home team win; Yellow = draw; Red = away team win.

Second half of the season
| Home \ Away | BFC | JEL | LIE | MLU | SKO | SPJ | VEN |
|---|---|---|---|---|---|---|---|
| BFC Daugavpils | | 0–2 | 0–4 | 0–0 | 2–3 | 0–2 | 1–1 |
| Jelgava | 1–0 | | 1–1 | 3–1 | 0–2 | 1–0 | 0–0 |
| Liepāja | 1–0 | 1–0 | | 2–0 | 2–2 | 4–1 | 3–2 |
| METTA/LU | 0–2 | 2–4 | 0–4 | | 1–5 | 3–2 | 0–2 |
| Skonto FC | 0–0 | 2–3 | 1–2 | 3–1 | | 2–1 | 0–2 |
| Spartaks Jūrmala | 2–1 | 0–1 | 0–2 | 0–3 | 1–3 | | 0–0 |
| Ventspils | 4–0 | 1–2 | 3–1 | 3–0 | 1–3 | 3–1 | |

Source: Virslīga 2015 (in Latvian)
Legend: Blue = home team win; Yellow = draw; Red = away team win.

== Season statistics ==
=== Top scorers ===
As of 7 November 2015

| Rank | Player | Club | Goals |
|---|---|---|---|
| 1 | (Latvia) Dāvis Ikaunieks | Liepāja | 15 |
| 2 | (Latvia) Vladislavs Gutkovskis | Skonto | 10 |
| 2 | (Albania) Ndue Mujeci | Ventspils | 10 |
| 4 | (Latvia) Ģirts Karlsons | Ventspils | 8 |
| 4 | (Latvia) Andrejs Kovaļovs | Skonto | 8 |

Updated to match(es) played on 7 November 2015.
Source:UEFA
