= JFK Saldus =

Latvian youth football club from Saldus

- Full name: Jauniešu futbola klubs Saldus (Youth Football Club Saldus)
- Founded: 2012
- Ground: Saldus pilsētas stadions, Saldus, Latvia
- Chairman: Ainars Seļickis
- Manager: Raitis Lilienšteins
- League: Latvian Second League
- 2016: Latvian First League, 13th (relegated)
- Website: http://jfksaldus.mozello.lv

JFK Saldus is an inactive Latvian youth football club, based in Saldus, the capital of Saldus Municipality. At the moment, the team mostly exists only as a legal entity.

From 2012 to 2016 JFK Saldus fielded a team in the Latvian First League and Second League, which was managed by Raitis Lilienšteins.

== History ==
The club was founded on 2 March 2012 and its first two seasons were played in the Second League. In 2013, JFK Saldus finished 2nd in the Second League and was promoted to the First League.

However, the team mostly lingered around the bottom of the table, and after being relegated from the First League in 2016, the main team mostly reverted to activities in youth football, become mostly dormant after 2022. In 2018, the legal association behind the club was banned by court order from re-registering.

== League history ==
Season	Division	Pos.
2012	Second League	4
2013	Second League	2
2014	First League	13
2015	First League	14
2016	First League	15

== Players ==
Head Coach: Raitis Lilienšteins

=== First-team squad ===
As of 14 May 2015

Note: Flags indicate national team as defined under FIFA eligibility rules; some limited exceptions apply. Players may hold more than one non-FIFA nationality.

No.	Pos.	Nation	Player
2	DF	LAT	Gatis Bērzs
5	DF	LAT	Deniss Sokoļskis
6	MF	LAT	Anrijs Rozenfelds
7	DF	LAT	Artūrs Smoļakovs
8	DF	LAT	Deniss Vitkovskis
10	MF	LAT	Žanis Pinka
11	MF	LAT	Rainers Geruļskis
12	GK	LAT	Edgars Potapenko (Captain)

No.	Pos.	Nation	Player
13	DF	LAT	Artūrs Mhitarjans
14	FW	LAT	Aivis Pone
15	DF	LAT	Dāvis Fjodorovs
18	MF	LAT	Vladislavs Kristenko
19	MF	LAT	Kaspars Tauberis
51	MF	LAT	Jurijs Teretenko
77	GK	LAT	Maksims Rudskojs
95	DF	LAT	Toms Rozentāls
