= FK Metta =

Latvian football club

Metta
- Full name: Futbola klubs Metta
- Founded: 2006; 20 years ago
- Ground: Futbola centrs Rūpnīca, Sarkandaugava, Riga
- Capacity: 500
- Chairman: Ģirts Mihelsons
- Manager: Andris Riherts
- League: Future League
- 2025: Virslīga, 10th of 10 (Relegated)
- Website: http://www.fsmetta.lv/
Home colours	Away colours	Third colours

FK Metta (also called FS Metta/Latvijas Universitāte from 2007 to 2018) is a professional Latvian football club based in Riga. As of 2012 they play in the Latvian Higher League. Metta plays its home games at Daugava Stadium. Until June 2018, their home venue was the Riga Hanza Secondary School Stadium.

== History ==
FS Metta (Latvian: Futbola skola Metta, lit. 'Football School Metta') was officially founded on 2 May 2006, though the club had been active in youth tournaments since 2000. In 2007 FS Metta and University of Latvia (Latvijas Universitāte) merged as a senior professional team and participated in the Latvian Championship first division (Traffic 1. līga). They finished the season in the fourth position.

The club remained at the same level for the next four seasons. Though a professional club, Metta initially retained the prefix FS (Futbola Skola), since their policy was to invest in youth players. In 2011 Metta won the Latvian First League championship and was automatically promoted to the Latvian Higher League – the top tier of Latvian football.

The affiliation with the university provides the club with a greater financial backing and the players with the opportunity to study at the most prestigious Latvian university. The club was created with the aim to gather the greatest youth talents from across the country and surrounding areas to build and shape them into expensive players for sale to bigger clubs.

In 2019, the partnership with the University of Latvia expired, and the club was renamed from FS Metta to FK Metta.

In 2020 FK Metta was the youngest top-tier team in Europe. At the end of the season, the team's average age was 19,5. In September 2020, FK Metta forward Raimonds Krollis made his debut for the Latvia national football team. He became the first-ever player that has gone through the whole FK Metta academy and played for the senior national team.

In the 2025 Latvian Higher League season, Metta placed last and was relegated to the Latvian First League. Prior to the start of the 2026 season, the club unveiled its new sports complex at Sāremas iela in Sarkandaugava, Riga - the Futbola centrs Rūpnīca ('Factory Football Center'). The center was built on the location of the former Energoautomātika Stadium (Latvian: "Energoautomātikas" stadions) which was demolished around 2024.

=== Patron of the University of Latvia ===
Football school "Metta" is a silver patron of the University of Latvia Foundation. They have supported the University of Latvia since 2016, donating to the football system and scholarships.

== Participation in Latvian Championships ==
Season	Division	Pos./Teams	Pl.	W	D	L	GS	GA	P	Latvian Football Cup
2007	2nd (1.līga)	4/(16)	30	18	7	5	67	23	61	1/8 finals
2008	2nd (1.līga)	5/(15)	28	13	9	6	43	27	48	1/8 finals
2009	2nd (1.līga)	6/(14)	26	13	6	7	47	19	45	Not Held
2010	2nd (1.līga)	5/(12)	22	10	6	6	42	25	36	1/8 finals
2011	2nd (1.līga)	1/(13)	24	17	5	2	61	14	56	1/8 finals
2012	1st (Virslīga)	8(10)	36	7	8	21	39	82	29	1/8 finals
2013	1st (Virslīga)	9(10)	27	4	7	16	15	47	19	1/16 finals
2014	1st (Virslīga)	9(10)	36	3	7	26	26	69	16	1/16 finals
2015	1st (Virslīga)	7(8)	24	3	3	18	19	56	12	1/4 finals
2016	1st (Virslīga)	7(8)	28	8	6	14	32	47	30	1/4 finals
2017	1st (Virslīga)	7(8)	24	3	6	15	21	46	15	1/4 finals
2018	1st (Virslīga)	7(8)	28	5	4	19	24	52	19	1/2 finals
2019	1st (Virslīga)	9(9)	32	6	8	18	35	60	26	1/8 finals
2020	1st (Virslīga)	9(10)	27	4	4	19	22	55	16	1/8 finals
2021	1st (Virslīga)	7(10)	28	5	5	18	33	55	20	1/8 finals
2022	1st (Virslīga)	9(10)	36	5	7	24	41	86	22	1/4 finals
2023	1st (Virslīga)	9(10)	36	8	9	19	41	63	33	1/8 finals
2024	1st (Virslīga)	7(10)	36	10	6	20	34	76	36	1/8 finals
2025	1st (Virslīga)	10(10)	36	8	7	21	39	74	31	1/8 finals
2026	TBD (LVBET līga)	TBD								TBD

== Managers ==
- (Latvia) Andris Riherts (May 2006 – June 2021)
- (Latvia) Andrejs Gluščuks (June 2021 – present)

== Current players ==
=== First-team squad ===
As of 6 April, 2026 Note: Flags indicate national team as defined under FIFA eligibility rules; some limited exceptions apply. Players may hold more than one non-FIFA nationality.

No.	Pos.	Nation	Player
1	GK	LAT	Krists Pļaviņš
4	DF	LAT	Kārlis Vilnis
5	DF	LAT	Ivo Minkevičs
6	MF	NGR	Waris Lawal
7	MF	LAT	Rendijs Šibass
8	MF	NGR	Abdulraheem Suleiman
9	FW	NGR	Sadiq Saleh
10	MF	LAT	Rūdolfs Kļavinskis
13	MF	LAT	Daniels Petersons
14	DF	LAT	Gundars Smilskalns

No.	Pos.	Nation	Player
15	MF	LAT	Daņiils Čiņajevs
16	DF	LAT	Oskars Likas
17	FW	LAT	Olivers Dzenitis
18	MF	LAT	Henrijs Gulbis
19	MF	LAT	Ernests Ivanovskis-Pigits
20	FW	NGR	Kehinde Abdulraheem
24	GK	LAT	Toms Tolmanis
25	DF	GHA	Yusif Yakubu
27	MF	LAT	Kevins Cēsnieks

=== Out on loan ===
Note: Flags indicate national team as defined under FIFA eligibility rules; some limited exceptions apply. Players may hold more than one non-FIFA nationality.

No.	Pos.	Nation	Player
23	MF	GHA	Mahamud Karimu (at Harju JK until 31 December 2025)

== Player of the year ==
Season	Player
2006	(Latvia) Jānis Kauss
2007	(Latvia) Vladimirs Cīmanis
2008	(Latvia) Ivars Gailis
2009	(Latvia) Marsels Vapne
2010	(Latvia) Juris Skābardis
2011	(Latvia) Rūdolfs Puķītis
2012	(Latvia) Mārtiņš Milašēvičs
2013	(Latvia) Gatis Kalniņš
2014	(Latvia) Edgars Vardanjans
2015	(Latvia) Eduards Emsis
2016	(Latvia) Roberts Uldriķis
2017	(Latvia) Dāvis Indrāns
2019	(Latvia) Dāvis Ošs
2019	(South Africa) Kgotso Masangane
2020	(Latvia) Raimonds Krollis
2021	(Latvia) Lūkass Vapne
2022	(Latvia) Jānis Beks

== Club officials ==
=== Board of directors ===
- General secretary: Ģirts Mihelsons
- Executive Director: Maira Mihelsone

=== Coaching staff ===
- Manager: Andris Riherts
- Fitness Coach: Jānis Skābardis

=== Staff ===
- Press Officer: Miks Vilkaplāters
- Technical manager: Harijs Toms

== Kit manufacturers and shirt sponsors ==
Period	Kit manufacturer	Shirt sponsor
2007	(United States) Nike	(Latvia) Deac
2008	(United States) Nike	(Latvia) Elko
2009	(United States) Nike	(Latvia) Deac
2010	(United States) Nike	(Latvia) Deac
2011	(United States) Nike	(Latvia) Deac
2012	(United States) Nike	(Latvia) SMScredit.lv
2013	(United States) Nike	(Latvia) SMScredit.lv
2014	(United States) Nike	none
2015	(United States) Nike	none
2016	(United States) Nike	none
2017	(United States) Nike	none
2018	(United States) Nike	none
2019	(United States) Nike	none
2020	(United States) Nike	none
2021	(United States) Nike	none
2022		
2023		
2024		
2025		
2026		

== Honours ==
- Latvian First League
  - Champions (1): 2011
