= FK Ogre =

Latvian football club, 2011–2018

- Full name: Futbola klubs Ogre; Biedrība "Futbola klubs Ogre"
- Founded: February 8, 2011; 15 years ago
- Dissolved: December 27, 2018; 7 years ago
- Ground: Ogres stadions, Ogre, Latvia
- Chairman: Aigars Počs
- Manager: Igors Troickis
- League: Latvian First League
- 2016: 12th

FK Ogre was a Latvian football club from Ogre, Ogre Municipality. Founded in 2011, the team played its home games in Ogre Stadium, which had been unveiled in 1968.

Initially, they played in the Latvian Second League Riga Division (Zone), before being promoted in 2013. From 2014 the team 2017 played in the second-highest division of Latvian football (the Latvian First League) and the Latvian Football Cup (reaching the quarterfinals).

On 14 July 2017 the Latvian Football Federation Disciplinary Commission announced that the federation excluded two teams from the First League (FK Jēkabpils/JSC and FK Ogre), and one from the Second League team (FC Raita Riga), for an indefinite period for suspicious activity related to match fixing. Five individuals – FK Ogre head coach head coach Igors Troickis and well as four players: Aleksejs Kuplovs-Oginskis, Deniss Sokoļskis, Oļegs Peņkovskis and Sergejs Lebedevs – received 36-month-long footballing bans.

The club did not recover from the ban and the Association "Ogre Football Club" was dissolved on 27 December 2018.

An unrelated club, FK Fortūna Ogre (founded in 1991), used the same name during the 1997–198 Latvian Second League season, earning promotion.

== Players ==
=== First-team squad ===
As of 12 June 2016. Note: Flags indicate national team as defined under FIFA eligibility rules; some limited exceptions apply. Players may hold more than one non-FIFA nationality.

No.	Pos.	Nation	Player
1	GK	LAT	Edgars Vaņins
2	MF	LAT	Oskars Ikstens
3	MF	LAT	Ivans Sputajs
4	DF	UKR	Oleksandr Harbar
5	DF	LAT	Staņislavs Pihockis
6	DF	UKR	Ihor Radchenko
7	MF	UKR	Anton Yaremenko
8	MF	LAT	Andrejs Kondratjevs
9	FW	LAT	Vits Rimkus
10	FW	UKR	Vyacheslav Shevchenko

No.	Pos.	Nation	Player
11	MF	LAT	Mihails Makarovs
13	GK	LAT	Justs Gūtmanis
14	MF	LAT	Kristaps Priedēns
15	MF	LAT	Jurijs Macuks
16	DF	LAT	Ruslans Ahmetovs
17	FW	LAT	Emīls Muižnieks
20	DF	LAT	Deniss Sokoļskis
22	DF	LAT	Konstantīns Fjodorovs
--	MF	LAT	Aldis Polis
--	MF	LAT	Romans Atrahimovičs
