= 2016 Latvian First League =

komanda.lv Pirmā līga
- Season: 2016
- Champions: SK Babīte
- Promoted: SK Babīte
- Relegated: JFK Saldus
- Top goalscorer: Dzmitry Kuzmin (47) (Tukums 2000 TSS)
- Biggest home win: Smiltene/BJSS 13–0 Jēkabpils/JSC (22 October 2016)
- Biggest away win: JFK Saldus 0–11 Auda (4 June 2016); JFK Saldus 0–11 Valmiera Glass FK/BSS (20 August 2016)
- Highest scoring: Smiltene/BJSS 13–0 Jēkabpils/JSC (22 October 2016)

The 2016 Latvian First League (referred to as the komanda.lv Pirmā līga for sponsorship reasons) started on 2 April 2016 and ended on 11 November 2016.

== League table ==
Pos	Team	Pld	W	D	L	GF	GA	GD	Pts	Qualification or relegation
1	SK Babīte (P, C)	28	26	0	2	102	25	+77	78	Promotion to Higher League
2	AFA Olaine/SK Super Nova	28	20	2	6	74	21	+53	62	Qualification for promotion/relegation play-offs
3	FK Auda	28	20	1	7	79	42	+37	61	
4	Valmiera Glass FK/BSS	28	19	0	9	81	29	+52	57	
5	Rēzeknes FA/BJSS	28	18	1	9	103	47	+56	55	
6	FK Tukums 2000 TSS	28	16	2	10	100	59	+41	50	
7	FK Smiltene/BJSS	28	15	3	10	74	47	+27	48	
8	Skonto FC (Note: Skonto FC had 8 points deducted for various financial reasons.) (R)	28	16	2	10	71	40	+31	42	Bankrupt; left in December 2016.
9	RTU FC	28	13	3	12	59	46	+13	42	
10	FK Staiceles Bebri	28	10	2	16	48	73	−25	32	
11	JDFS Alberts	28	9	2	17	32	61	−29	29	
12	FK Ogre	28	7	1	20	37	70	−33	22	
13	Preiļu BJSS	28	5	1	22	28	92	−64	16	
14	FK Jēkabpils/JSC	28	4	2	22	32	138	−106	14	
15	JFK Saldus (R)	28	1	0	27	13	143	−130	3	Relegation to Second League

Source: rsssf.com
Rules for classification: 1) points; 2) goal difference; 3) number of goals scored.
(C) Champions; (P) Promoted; (R) Relegated
