= FK Staiceles Bebri =

Latvian football club

- Full name: Futbola klubs Staiceles Bebri
- Founded: 1994
- Ground: MTC Staicele
- Manager: Jānis Valaņins
- League: Latvian First League
- 2018: 11th
Home colours	Away colours

FK Staiceles Bebri is a Latvian football club. They compete in the second-highest division of Latvian football (1. līga). It is based in Staicele. In the 2014 season they finished 2nd in the Latvian 2. līga and were promoted to 1. līga also receiving a license for participation at that level.
