= List of Latvian football transfers winter 2022–23 =

This is a list of Latvian football transfers in the winter transfer window 2022-23 by club. Only clubs of the 2023 Latvian Higher League are included.

== Latvian Higher League ==
=== Valmiera FC ===
In: Note: Flags indicate national team as defined under FIFA eligibility rules; some limited exceptions apply. Players may hold more than one non-FIFA nationality.

No.	Pos.	Nation	Player
—	GK	VEN	Carlos Olses (from (Venezuela) Deportivo La Guaira)
—	GK	LVA	Dāvis Veisbuks (from Spartaks Jūrmala)
—	DF	LVA	Niks Sliede (from RFS)
—	DF	UKR	Yevhen Opanasenko (from (Ukraine) Dynamo Kyiv U-19)
—	MF	LVA	Kristers Neilands (loan return from Tukums 2000)
—	MF	LVA	Rūdolfs Zeņģis (loan return from Metta/LU)
—	MF	JPN	Ryuga Nakamura (loan return from Tukums 2000)
—	MF	TUN	Fraj Kayramani (from (Tunisia) Étoile Sportive du Sahel)
—	MF	LVA	Renārs Varslavāns (on loan from RFS)
—	MF	BRA	Tiago Gonsalves Barbosa (from (Finland) Kemi Kings)
—	MF	LVA	Kristers Volkovs (from Grobiņas SC/LFS)
—	MF	BRA	Gustavo Silva Souza (from (Brazil) Internacional)
—	MF	ALG	Adel Ghanem (on loan from (Algeria) MC Alger)
—	MF	BRA	Gustavo Silva Souza (from (Brazil) Internacional)
—	FW	SEN	Ibrahima Ndiape Sow (loan return from Tukums 2000)
—	FW	LVA	Ingars Pūlis (loan return from Metta/LU)
—	FW	LVA	Ēriks Punculs (loan return from Liepāja)
—	FW	LVA	Kristiāns Kaušelis (loan return from Tukums 2000)
—	FW	BRA	Ruan Ribeiro (on loan from (Brazil) Palmeiras U-20)
—	FW	FRA	Jeremie Porsan-Clemente (from (France) Saint-Étienne B)

Out: Note: Flags indicate national team as defined under FIFA eligibility rules; some limited exceptions apply. Players may hold more than one non-FIFA nationality.

No.	Pos.	Nation	Player
—	GK	LVA	Rihards Matrevics (to Riga FC)
—	GK	LVA	Rūdolfs Soloha (to SK Super Nova)
—	DF	UKR	Roman Yakuba (on loan to (Poland) Puszcza)
—	DF	LVA	Oļģerts Raščevskis (on loan to SK Super Nova)
—	MF	LVA	Lūkass Vapne (loan return to Metta/LU)
—	MF	JPN	Masaki Murata (to (Azerbaijan) Sumgayit)
—	MF	GEO	Luka Silagadze (to (Georgia (country)) Saburtalo)
—	MF	UKR	Artur Murza (on loan to (Kazakhstan) Aksu)
—	MF	JPN	Daisuke Yokota (to (Poland) Górnik Zabrze)
—	MF	JPN	Ryuga Nakamura (to (Lithuania) Hegelmann)
—	MF	LVA	Rūdolfs Zeņģis (to FS Jelgava)
—	MF	LVA	Artjoms Šaboha (to Tukums 2000)
—	FW	LVA	Raimonds Krollis (to (Italy) Spezia)
—	FW	UGA	Derrick Kakooza (to (Egypt) ENPPI)
—	FW	COL	Camilo Mena (on loan to (Poland) Jagiellonia Białystok)
—	FW	SEN	Ibrahima Ndiape Sow (to (Czech Republic) FK Viktoria Žižkov)
—	FW	LVA	Kristers Lūsiņš (on loan to SK Super Nova)
—	FW	LVA	Kristiāns Kaušelis (on loan to SK Super Nova)

=== Riga ===
In: Note: Flags indicate national team as defined under FIFA eligibility rules; some limited exceptions apply. Players may hold more than one non-FIFA nationality.

No.	Pos.	Nation	Player
—	GK	LVA	Iļja Isajevs (loan return from Spartaks Jūrmala)
—	GK	LVA	Rihards Matrevics (from Valmiera)
—	GK	LVA	Kristaps Zommers (from Super Nova)
—	DF	LVA	Kirils Iļjins (from Daugavpils)
—	DF	SEN	Mor Talla (on loan from Auda)
—	DF	CRO	Petar Bosančić (from (Bulgaria) Cherno More)
—	MF	LVA	Eduards Daškevičs (from (Norway) HamKam)
—	MF	SEN	Ousseynou Niang (from Auda)
—	MF	SRB	Miloš Jojić (from (Serbia) Partizan)
—	MF	FRA	Kemelho Nguena (from (Bulgaria) Slavia Sofia)
—	MF	CIV	Aboubakar Karamoko (on loan from Auda)
—	FW	LVA	Marko Regža (from Super Nova)
—	FW	BRA	Douglas Aurélio (from (Cyprus) Pafos, previously on loan)
—	FW	SEN	Meleye Diagne (from (Senegal) Diambars)
—	FW	CRO	Marko Dabro (on loan from (China) Beijing Guoan)
—	FW	BRA	Reginaldo (from (Brazil) Audax)

Out: Note: Flags indicate national team as defined under FIFA eligibility rules; some limited exceptions apply. Players may hold more than one non-FIFA nationality.

No.	Pos.	Nation	Player
—	GK	LVA	Dāvis Ošs (to Spartaks Jūrmala)
—	GK	LVA	Frenks Orols (to RFS, previously on loan at Auda)
—	GK	LVA	Roberts Ozols (to Auda)
—	DF	LVA	Antons Kurakins (released)
—	DF	LVA	Vjačeslavs Isajevs (to Auda, previously on loan)
—	DF	SWE	Doug Bergqvist (on loan to Auda)
—	DF	LVA	Jegors Novikovs (to Auda, previously on loan)
—	MF	LVA	Ritvars Rugins (released)
—	MF	LVA	Vladimirs Kamešs (to (Norway) Elverum)
—	MF	LVA	Aleksejs Saveļjevs (to Auda, previously on loan)
—	MF	BRA	Gabriel Ramos (to (South Korea) Bucheon FC 1995)
—	MF	NED	Navarone Foor (to (Netherlands) Cambuur)
—	MF	BLR	Yury Kendysh (released)
—	MF	NGA	Abiodun Ogunniyi (to Auda, previously on loan)
—	FW	UKR	Oleksandr Filippov (loan return to (Belgium) Sint-Truiden)
—	FW	ARG	Marcelo Torres (loan return to (Cyprus) Pafos)
—	FW	RUS	Stanislav Krapukhin (to Auda, previously on loan)
—	FW	FRA	Brice Tutu (released)
—	FW	SEN	Meleye Diagne (on loan to Auda)
—	FW	LVA	Artūrs Ostapenko (on loan to Super Nova, previously on loan at Spartaks Jūrmala)

=== RFS ===
In: Note: Flags indicate national team as defined under FIFA eligibility rules; some limited exceptions apply. Players may hold more than one non-FIFA nationality.

No.	Pos.	Nation	Player
—	GK	LVA	Frenks Orols (from Riga FC)
—	GK	LVA	Jānis Beks (from Metta/LU)
—	DF	LVA	Jānis Krautmanis (loan return from Tukums 2000)
—	DF	LVA	Niks Sliede (loan return from Tukums 2000)
—	DF	LVA	Mārcis Ošs (free agent)
—	DF	LVA	Roberts Savaļnieks (from Liepāja)
—	MF	LVA	Jānis Ikaunieks (from (Finland) KuPS)
—	MF	LVA	Markuss Alpēns (from Spartaks Jūrmala)
—	MF	FIN	Adam Markhiyev (from Spartaks Jūrmala)
—	MF	LVA	Rodrigo Gaučis (from Grobiņas SC/LFS)
—	FW	BRA	Léo Gaúcho (loan return from Spartaks Jūrmala)
—	FW	BIH	Aleksej Golijanin (from (Serbia) Grafičar)
—	FW	BRA	Pedro Igor (from (Brazil) Floresta U-20)
—	FW	LTU	Faustas Steponavičius (from (Croatia) Jarun)

Out: Note: Flags indicate national team as defined under FIFA eligibility rules; some limited exceptions apply. Players may hold more than one non-FIFA nationality.

No.	Pos.	Nation	Player
—	GK	LTU	Vytautas Černiauskas (to (Lithuania) FK Panevėžys)
—	GK	LVA	Jānis Beks (on loan to Metta/LU)
—	DF	LVA	Vitālijs Maksimenko (released)
—	DF	LVA	Jānis Krautmanis (to Liepāja)
—	DF	LVA	Vladislavs Fjodorovs (to Metta/LU)
—	DF	LVA	Niks Sliede (to Valmiera)
—	MF	AUT	Tomáš Šimkovič (retired)
—	MF	CRO	Tomislav Šarić (to (Croatia) Jarun)
—	MF	BRA	Bill (loan return to (Ukraine) Dnipro-1)
—	MF	SRB	Stefan Cvetković (to (Serbia) Radnički Niš, previously on loan)
—	MF	LVA	Renārs Varslavāns (on loan to Valmiera)
—	MF	LVA	Markuss Alpēns (on loan to Tukums 2000)
—	MF	LVA	Gļebs Žaleiko (on loan to BFC Daugavpils)
—	FW	LVA	Deniss Rakels (to SK Super Nova)
—	FW	AUT	Kevin Friesenbichler (to (Poland) Lechia Gdańsk)
—	FW	LTU	Faustas Steponavičius (on loan to Tukums 2000)
—	FW	CIV	Ismaël Diomandé (on loan to BFC Daugavpils)

=== Liepāja ===
In: Note: Flags indicate national team as defined under FIFA eligibility rules; some limited exceptions apply. Players may hold more than one non-FIFA nationality.

No.	Pos.	Nation	Player
—	GK	LVA	Vladislavs Lazarevs (Free agent)
—	GK	GEO	Luka Sanikidze (from (Georgia (country)) Telavi)
—	DF	LVA	Jānis Krautmanis (from RFS)
—	DF	BEL	Henri Stanic (Free agent)
—	DF	LVA	Dmitrijs Litvinskis (from Daugavpils)
—	MF	GEO	Georgi Kutsia (on loan from (Georgia (country)) Dinamo Tbilisi)
—	MF	UKR	Artem Bilyi (from (Armenia) Van)
—	MF	NED	Guillermo Gauna (Free agent)
—	MF	NGA	Luqman Gilmore (from (Georgia (country)) Samgurali Tsqaltubo)
—	MF	LVA	Maksims Fjodorovs (from Tukums 2000)
—	MF	LVA	Jānis Grīnbergs (from Metta)
—	MF	CMR	Joseph Minala (from (Italy) Olbia)
—	FW	NGA	Precious Ediae (from (Kosovo) FC Phoenix Banjë)
—	FW	LVA	Markuss Kruglaužs (from Tukums 2000)
—	FW	GHA	David Anane Martin (Free agent)
—	FW	NED	Nino Noordanus (from (Netherlands) Excelsior Maassluis)
—	FW	NGA	Success Makanjuola (from (Spain) Diocesano)

Out: Note: Flags indicate national team as defined under FIFA eligibility rules; some limited exceptions apply. Players may hold more than one non-FIFA nationality.

No.	Pos.	Nation	Player
—	GK	LVA	Vjačeslavs Kudrjavcevs (to SK Super Nova)
—	GK	UKR	Artem Malysh (on loan to Grobiņas SC/LFS)
—	DF	LVA	Roberts Savaļnieks (to RFS)
—	DF	BRA	Marquese Pedroso (to (Romania) Mioveni)
—	DF	ANG	Inácio Miguel (to (Angola) Petro de Luanda)
—	DF	BIH	Kenan Hreljić (released)
—	DF	LVA	Krišs Kārkliņš (released)
—	DF	BIH	Slaviša Radović (to (Bosnia and Herzegovina) Sarajevo)
—	DF	URU	Martín Marta (to (Uruguay) River Plate)
—	MF	SRB	Nemanja Belaković (to (Serbia) Radnički Niš)
—	MF	ARG	Leonel Strumia ( (Kazakhstan) Aktobe)
—	MF	BRA	Lucas Vilela (to (Armenia) Pyunik)
—	FW	LVA	Ēriks Punculs (loan return to Valmiera FC)
—	FW	BEL	Jordy Soladio (to (Vietnam) Song Lam Nghe An)

=== FK Auda ===
In: Note: Flags indicate national team as defined under FIFA eligibility rules; some limited exceptions apply. Players may hold more than one non-FIFA nationality.

No.	Pos.	Nation	Player
—	GK	LVA	Roberts Ozols (from Riga)
—	DF	LVA	Vjačeslavs Isajevs (from Riga FC, previously on loan)
—	DF	SWE	Doug Bergqvist (on loan from Riga)
—	DF	LVA	Iļja Semjonovs (from SK Super Nova)
—	DF	LVA	Jegors Novikovs (from Riga FC, previously on loan)
—	MF	LVA	Artūrs Krancmanis (loan return from Spartaks Jūrmala)
—	MF	LVA	Aleksejs Saveļjevs (from Riga FC, previously on loan)
—	MF	ARG	Mateo Piteo (from (Argentina) Almirante Brown)
—	MF	LVA	Raivis Skrebels (from Spartaks)
—	MF	LVA	Deniss Meļņiks (from Spartaks Jūrmala)
—	MF	GHA	Jonah Attuquaye (from (Ghana) Legon Cities)
—	MF	NGA	Abiodun Ogunniyi (from Riga FC, previously on loan)
—	MF	CIV	Abdoul Kader Traore (from (Ivory Coast) LYS Sassandra)
—	MF	SEN	El-Hadji Mane (from (Senegal) Diambars)
—	MF	MLI	Sekou Sanogo (Free agent)
—	FW	RUS	Stanislav Krapukhin (from Riga FC, previously on loan)
—	FW	SEN	Meleye Diagne (on loan from Riga)

Out: Note: Flags indicate national team as defined under FIFA eligibility rules; some limited exceptions apply. Players may hold more than one non-FIFA nationality.

No.	Pos.	Nation	Player
—	GK	LVA	Frenks Orols (loan return to Riga FC)
—	DF	GER	Kilian Senkbeil (to (Germany) SGV Freiberg)
—	DF	SEN	Mor Talla (on loan to Riga FC)
—	MF	SEN	Ousseynou Niang (to Riga FC)
—	MF	CIV	Aboubakar Karamoko (on loan to Riga FC)
—	MF	LVA	Raivis Ķiršs (on loan to Tukums 2000)
—	MF	LVA	Arturs Krancmanis (on loan to Tukums 2000)
—	FW	CMR	William Mukwelle (loan return to BFC Daugavpils)
—	FW	RUS	Stanislav Krapukhin (to (Kazakhstan) Aksu)

=== FK Tukums 2000 ===
In: Note: Flags indicate national team as defined under FIFA eligibility rules; some limited exceptions apply. Players may hold more than one non-FIFA nationality.

No.	Pos.	Nation	Player
—	GK	LVA	Vladislavs Kapustins (from (Italy) Rotonda)
—	DF	LVA	Deņiss Rogovs (from Spartaks)
—	MF	LVA	Armans Galajs (from Rēzeknes FA)
—	MF	LVA	Roberts Meļķis (from Grobiņas SC/LFS)
—	MF	LVA	Artjoms Šaboha (from Valmiera)
—	MF	LVA	Markuss Alpēns (from RFS)
—	MF	LVA	Kārlis Mikuļskis (from Grobiņas SC/LFS)
—	MF	LVA	Raivis Ķiršs (on loan from Auda)
—	MF	LVA	Arturs Krancmanis (on loan from Auda)
—	FW	LTU	Faustas Steponavičius (on loan from RFS)

Out: Note: Flags indicate national team as defined under FIFA eligibility rules; some limited exceptions apply. Players may hold more than one non-FIFA nationality.

No.	Pos.	Nation	Player
—	GK	LVA	Helmuts Saulītis (to Saldus Leevon)
—	DF	LVA	Niks Sliede (loan return to RFS)
—	DF	LVA	Jānis Krautmanis (laon return to RFS)
—	MF	LVA	Kristers Neilands (loan return to Valmiera FC)
—	MF	JPN	Ryuga Nakamura (loan return to Valmiera FC)
—	MF	LVA	Maksims Fjodorovs (to Liepāja)
—	MF	LVA	Oskars Rubenis (to FS Jelgava)
—	FW	SEN	Ibrahima Ndiape Sow (loan return to Valmiera FC)
—	FW	LVA	Kristiāns Kaušelis (loan return to Valmiera FC)
—	FW	LVA	Markuss Kruglaužs (to Liepāja)
—	FW	JPN	Ikuto Gomi (to (Lithuania) Dainava)
—	FW	LVA	Ričards Korzāns (to SK Super Nova)

=== BFC Daugavpils ===
In: Note: Flags indicate national team as defined under FIFA eligibility rules; some limited exceptions apply. Players may hold more than one non-FIFA nationality.

No.	Pos.	Nation	Player
—	DF	GHA	Moses Salifu Bawa Zuure (from (Ghana) Baffour Soccer Academy)
—	DF	CZE	Jaroslav Harušťák (on loan from (Czech Republic) MFK Chrudim)
—	MF	LVA	Gļebs Žaleiko (on loan from RFS)
—	MF	AZE	Ramin Nasirli (on loan from (Azerbaijan) Neftçi)
—	MF	AZE	Nazim Hasanzade (on loan from (Azerbaijan) Turan Tovuz)
—	FW	CMR	William Mukwelle (loan return from Auda)
—	FW	CIV	Ismaël Diomandé (on loan from RFS)

Out: Note: Flags indicate national team as defined under FIFA eligibility rules; some limited exceptions apply. Players may hold more than one non-FIFA nationality.

No.	Pos.	Nation	Player
—	DF	LVA	Kirils Iļjins (to Riga FC)
—	DF	LVA	Dmitrijs Litvinskis (to Liepāja)
—	MF	GEO	Lasha Kvaratskhelia (to (Georgia (country)) Shukura)
—	MF	COL	Rodolfo Grazziani (released)
—	FW	NGA	Dele Ola Israel (to (Czech Republic) Sigma Olomouc)

=== Spartaks Jūrmala* ===
In: Note: Flags indicate national team as defined under FIFA eligibility rules; some limited exceptions apply. Players may hold more than one non-FIFA nationality.

No.	Pos.	Nation	Player
—	GK	LVA	Dāvis Ošs (from Riga FC)
—	DF	NGA	Lucky Opara (loan return from (Estonia) Narva Trans)
—	FW	NCA	Ariagner Smith (loan return from (Lithuania) FK Panevėžys)

Out: Note: Flags indicate national team as defined under FIFA eligibility rules; some limited exceptions apply. Players may hold more than one non-FIFA nationality.

No.	Pos.	Nation	Player
—	GK	LVA	Iļja Isajevs (loan return to Riga FC)
—	GK	LVA	Dāvis Veisbuks (to Valmiera FC)
—	GK	LVA	Konstantīns Maculevičs (to Super Nova)
—	DF	LVA	Daniels Grauds (to FS Jelgava)
—	DF	NGA	Lucky Opara (to (United States) Northern Colorado Hailstorm)
—	DF	LVA	Artūrs Ļotčikovs (to SK Super Nova)
—	DF	LVA	Deņiss Rogovs (to Tukums 2000)
—	DF	LVA	Kristers Atars (to SK Super Nova)
—	DF	LVA	Klāvs Kramēns (to (Lithuania) Dainava)
—	MF	LVA	Artūrs Krancmanis (loan return to Auda)
—	MF	LVA	Markuss Alpēns (to RFS)
—	MF	LVA	Oļegs Laizāns (to SK Super Nova)
—	MF	RUS	Valentin Zekhov (to (Greece) Chania)
—	MF	FIN	Adam Markhiyev (to RFS)
—	MF	UKR	Yaroslav Terekhov (to (Moldova) Milsami)
—	MF	LVA	Kristians Godiņš (to SK Super Nova)
—	MF	LVA	Daņila Patijčuks (to FS Jelgava)
—	MF	LVA	Raivis Skrebels (to Auda)
—	MF	LVA	Deniss Meļņiks (to Auda)
—	FW	BRA	Léo Gaúcho (loan return to RFS)
—	FW	LVA	Artūrs Ostapenko (loan return to Riga FC)
—	FW	LVA	Artjoms Zamullo (to Dinamo)

=== Metta ===
In: Note: Flags indicate national team as defined under FIFA eligibility rules; some limited exceptions apply. Players may hold more than one non-FIFA nationality.

No.	Pos.	Nation	Player
—	GK	LVA	Jānis Beks (on loan from RFS)
—	DF	LVA	Vladislavs Fjodorovs (from RFS)
—	MF	LVA	Lūkass Vapne (loan return from Valmiera FC)
—	MF	UKR	Oleksandr Kurtsev (from (Ukraine) Metalist 1925 B)
—	MF	SEN	Ousmane Sow (from (Senegal) Génération Foot)
—	MF	GEO	Zurab Rukhadze (from (Georgia (country)) Saburtalo Tbilisi B)

Out: Note: Flags indicate national team as defined under FIFA eligibility rules; some limited exceptions apply. Players may hold more than one non-FIFA nationality.

No.	Pos.	Nation	Player
—	GK	LVA	Jānis Beks (to RFS)
—	DF	CRO	Ivan Harambašić (released)
—	DF	LVA	Niklāvs Treimanis (retired)
—	DF	LVA	Daniels Fedorovičs (to (Czech Republic) SK Hanácká Slavia Kroměříž)
—	MF	LVA	Rūdolfs Zeņģis (loan return to Valmiera FC)
—	MF	LVA	Jānis Grīnbergs (to Liepāja)
—	MF	LVA	Noa Meroža (to (Portugal) Académico de Viseu)
—	FW	LVA	Ingars Pūlis (loan return to Valmiera FC)
—	FW	CMR	Jean Mbassi (to Jelgava)

=== SK Super Nova ===
In: Note: Flags indicate national team as defined under FIFA eligibility rules; some limited exceptions apply. Players may hold more than one non-FIFA nationality.

No.	Pos.	Nation	Player
—	GK	LVA	Vjačeslavs Kudrjavcevs (from Liepāja)
—	GK	LVA	Rūdolfs Soloha (from Valmiera FC)
—	DF	LVA	Oļģerts Raščevskis (on loan from Valmiera FC)
—	DF	LVA	Artūrs Ļotčikovs (from Spartaks Jūrmala)
—	DF	LVA	Kristers Atars (from Spartaks Jūrmala)
—	MF	LVA	Oļegs Laizāns (from Spartaks Jūrmala)
—	MF	LVA	Ivans Patrikejevs (from FK Salaspils)
—	MF	LVA	Kristians Godiņš (from Spartaks Jūrmala)
—	FW	LVA	Kristers Lūsiņš (on loan from Valmiera FC)
—	FW	LVA	Kristiāns Kaušelis (on loan from Valmiera FC)
—	FW	LVA	Artūrs Ostapenko (on loan from Riga FC)
—	FW	LVA	Ričards Korzāns (from Tukums 2000)
—	FW	LVA	Deniss Rakels (from RFS)

Out: Note: Flags indicate national team as defined under FIFA eligibility rules; some limited exceptions apply. Players may hold more than one non-FIFA nationality.

No.	Pos.	Nation	Player
—	GK	LVA	Kristaps Zommers (to Riga FC)
—	GK	LVA	Patriks Balodis (to AFA Olaine)
—	DF	LVA	Toms Šteinbergs (released)
—	DF	LVA	Ņikita Skļarenko (released)
—	DF	LVA	Iļja Semjonovs (to Auda)
—	DF	UKR	Yehor Smirnov (to Jelgava)
—	MF	LVA	Rihards Ozoliņš (released)
—	MF	UKR	Yevgeniy Terzi (to (Malta) Santa Lucia)
—	FW	LVA	Marko Regža (to Riga FC)
—	FW	LVA	Edgars Brics (released)
—	FW	LVA	Ričards Kauliņš (released)

=== Jelgava ===
In: Note: Flags indicate national team as defined under FIFA eligibility rules; some limited exceptions apply. Players may hold more than one non-FIFA nationality.

No.	Pos.	Nation	Player
—	DF	LVA	Daniels Grauds (from Spartaks Jūrmala)
—	DF	UKR	Yehor Smirnov (from Super Nova)
—	DF	UKR	Vladyslav Veremeev (free agent)
—	DF	LVA	Andrejs Kiriļins (from FK Beitar)
—	MF	LVA	Ralfs Burkāns (loan return from Leevon Saldus)
—	MF	LVA	Oskars Rubenis (from Tukums 2000)
—	MF	LVA	Daņila Patijčuks (from Spartaks Jūrmala)
—	MF	LVA	Rūdolfs Zeņģis (from Valmiera FC)
—	MF	LVA	Andrejs Kiriļins (from Beitar)
—	FW	NGA	Victor Osuagwu (on loan from (Czech Republic) SK Slavia Prague B)
—	FW	CMR	Jean Mbassi (from Metta)
—	FW	UKR	Vadym Mashchenko (from (Ukraine) Dynamo Kyiv)

Out: Note: Flags indicate national team as defined under FIFA eligibility rules; some limited exceptions apply. Players may hold more than one non-FIFA nationality.

No.	Pos.	Nation	Player
—	GK	NGA	Dele Alampasu (to (France) Jura Dolois)
—	DF	LVA	Jēkabs Šusts (to JDFS Alberts)
—	MF	JPN	Ryotaro Nakano (released)
—	MF	LVA	Ralfs Burkāns (to Leevon Saldus, previously on loan)
—	MF	LVA	Antons Dresmanis (retired)
—	MF	LVA	Kristaps Sleņģis (retired)
—	MF	LVA	Kristaps Kļaviņš (to (Italy) Cosenza U-19)
—	FW	LVA	Ričards Jirgensons (released)

* Spartaks Jūrmala failed to obtain the necessary license for participation in the 2023 Latvian Higher League.
