= List of Latvian football transfers winter 2024–25 =

This is a list of Latvian football transfers in the winter transfer window 2024-25 by club. Only clubs of the 2025 Latvian Higher League and 2025 Latvian First League are included.

== Latvian Higher League ==
=== RFS ===
In: Note: Flags indicate national team as defined under FIFA eligibility rules; some limited exceptions apply. Players may hold more than one non-FIFA nationality.

| No. | Pos. | Nation | Player |
|---|---|---|---|
| — | GK | LVA | Jānis Beks (loan return from Tukums 2000) |
| — | GK | LVA | Frenks Orols (loan return from BFC Daugavpils) |
| — | DF | LVA | Dāvis Cucurs (loan return from Tukums 2000) |
| — | DF | LVA | Kārlis Mikuļskis (loan return from Grobiņas SC/LFS) |
| — | DF | LVA | Niks Sliede (from Valmiera) |
| — | DF | LVA | Rendijs Šibass (from Metta/LU) |
| — | MF | JAM | Kenroy Campbell (loan return from Tukums 2000) |
| — | MF | JPN | Yukiyoshi Karashima (from (Lithuania) Žalgiris) |
| — | MF | SEN | Mor Talla (from Auda) |
| — | MF | LVA | Gļebs Žaleiko (from Daugavpils) |
| — | MF | GAM | Modou Saidy (from (United Arab Emirates) Elite Falcons) |
| — | FW | LVA | Valerijs Lizunovs (loan return from Tukums 2000) |
| — | FW | BFA | Fayçal Konaté (from (Burkina Faso) Salitas FC) |
| — | FW | FRA | Jeremie Porsan-Clemente (from Valmiera) |

Out: Note: Flags indicate national team as defined under FIFA eligibility rules; some limited exceptions apply. Players may hold more than one non-FIFA nationality.

| No. | Pos. | Nation | Player |
|---|---|---|---|
| — | GK | LVA | Frenks Orols (on loan to Super Nova) |
| — | GK | LVA | Jānis Beks (to Daugavpils) |
| — | DF | LVA | Mārcis Ošs (to Super Nova) |
| — | DF | LVA | Daniels Balodis (to (Scotland) St Johnstone) |
| — | DF | LVA | Dāvis Cucurs (to Daugavpils) |
| — | MF | FIN | Adam Markhiyev (to (Cyprus) Aris Limassol) |
| — | MF | GEO | Luka Silagadze (to (Georgia (country)) Iberia 1999) |
| — | MF | JAM | Kenroy Campbell (to (Serbia) IMT) |
| — | MF | SRB | Dragoljub Savić (to (Serbia) TSC) |
| — | MF | LVA | Jevgēņijs Miņins (to Super Nova) |
| — | MF | CGO | Taty Tchibinda (to Daugavpils) |
| — | MF | CIV | Mamadou Sylla (on loan to Super Nova) |
| — | FW | BRA | Emerson Deocleciano (to (Japan) V-Varen Nagasaki) |
| — | FW | LVA | Valerijs Lizunovs (to Daugavpils) |

=== Riga ===
In: Note: Flags indicate national team as defined under FIFA eligibility rules; some limited exceptions apply. Players may hold more than one non-FIFA nationality.

| No. | Pos. | Nation | Player |
|---|---|---|---|
| — | GK | LVA | Krišjānis Zviedris (from Auda) |
| — | DF | LVA | Maksims Toņiševs (from Valmiera) |
| — | DF | BRA | Paulo Eduardo (from (Portugal) Alverca) |
| — | MF | BRA | Iago Siqueira (from (Ukraine) Veres Rivne) |
| — | MF | PER | Joao Grimaldo (on loan from (Serbia) Partizan) |
| — | MF | BRA | Jackson (from (Turkey) İstanbulspor) |
| — | FW | NGA | Abdulrahman Taiwo (loan return from Auda) |
| — | FW | SEN | Meissa Diop (from Valmiera) |
| — | FW | CMR | Benato Bekima (from (Cameroon) Apejes) |

Out: Note: Flags indicate national team as defined under FIFA eligibility rules; some limited exceptions apply. Players may hold more than one non-FIFA nationality.

| No. | Pos. | Nation | Player |
|---|---|---|---|
| — | GK | LVA | Rihards Matrevics (to Auda) |
| — | DF | LVA | Kirils Iļjins (to Liepāja) |
| — | MF | ARG | Brian Orosco (loan return to (Argentina) Estudiantes (LP)) |
| — | MF | SEN | Pape Gueye (loan return to (United Arab Emirates) United) |
| — | MF | SRB | Miloš Jojić (to (Spain) Castellón) |
| — | MF | ARG | Gonzalo Muscia (to (Argentina) Nueva Chicago) |
| — | MF | CRO | Hrvoje Babec (on loan to (Croatia) Osijek) |
| — | MF | FRA | Kemelho Nguena (to Auda) |
| — | FW | CMR | Benato Bekima (on loan to Tukums 2000) |

=== Auda ===
In: Note: Flags indicate national team as defined under FIFA eligibility rules; some limited exceptions apply. Players may hold more than one non-FIFA nationality.

| No. | Pos. | Nation | Player |
|---|---|---|---|
| — | GK | LVA | Kristers Gabriels Bite (from Super Nova) |
| — | GK | LVA | Roberts Ozols (from (Uzbekistan) Qizilqum) |
| — | GK | LVA | Rihards Matrevics (from Riga) |
| — | DF | LVA | Jegors Novikovs (loan return from Metta/LU) |
| — | DF | LVA | Emīls Birka (from Valmiera) |
| — | DF | BRA | Rafael Pontelo (on loan from (Portugal) Sporting B, was on loan at (Cyprus) Pafos) |
| — | DF | SEN | Arona Fall (from (United Arab Emirates) United) |
| — | DF | GHA | Kudu Shama Abdul (from (Ghana) Benab) |
| — | MF | LVA | Ralfs Kragliks (from Valmiera) |
| — | MF | FRA | Kemelho Nguena (from Riga) |
| — | MF | GUI | Mamadou Kané (from (Cyprus) Pafos) |
| — | MF | CMR | Karl Gameni Wassom (from Riga II) |
| — | MF | LVA | Renārs Varslavāns (from Valmiera) |
| — | FW | BOL | Enzo Monteiro (on loan from (Brazil) Santos) |
| — | FW | CIV | Kader Koné (from (Ivory Coast) AFE Abidjan) |

Out: Note: Flags indicate national team as defined under FIFA eligibility rules; some limited exceptions apply. Players may hold more than one non-FIFA nationality.

| No. | Pos. | Nation | Player |
|---|---|---|---|
| — | GK | LVA | Raivo Stūriņš (on loan to Tukums 2000) |
| — | GK | LVA | Krišjānis Zviedris (to Riga) |
| — | GK | LVA | Kristers Gabriels Bite (on loan to Metta) |
| — | DF | LVA | Vjačeslavs Isajevs (to Liepāja) |
| — | DF | LVA | Iļja Korotkovs (Released) |
| — | DF | LVA | Krišs Kārkliņš (to Ogre United) |
| — | DF | CRO | Petar Bosančić (Released) |
| — | DF | POR | Bruno Tavares (to (Lithuania) Žalgiris) |
| — | MF | BRA | Lucas Ramos (loan return to (Brazil) Internacional) |
| — | MF | BRA | Pablinho (loan return to (Brazil) Cuiabá) |
| — | MF | LVA | Aleksejs Saveļjevs (to (Romania) Gloria Buzău) |
| — | MF | SEN | Mor Talla (to RFS) |
| — | MF | SEN | El-Hadji Mane (to (Austria) SKN St. Pölten) |
| — | MF | GHA | Jonah Attuquaye (to (Ghana) Berekum Chelsea) |
| — | FW | NGA | Abdulrahman Taiwo (loan return to Riga) |

=== Valmiera* ===
In: Note: Flags indicate national team as defined under FIFA eligibility rules; some limited exceptions apply. Players may hold more than one non-FIFA nationality.

| No. | Pos. | Nation | Player |
|---|---|---|---|
| — | MF | LVA | Oļģerts Raščevskis (loan return from BFC Daugavpils) |
| — | MF | LVA | Kristers Čudars (loan return from Grobiņa) |

Out: Note: Flags indicate national team as defined under FIFA eligibility rules; some limited exceptions apply. Players may hold more than one non-FIFA nationality.

| No. | Pos. | Nation | Player |
|---|---|---|---|
| — | GK | LVA | Dāvis Ošs (to Liepāja) |
| — | GK | VEN | Carlos Olses (to (Lithuania) FK Žalgiris) |
| — | GK | LVA | Dāvis Veisbuks (to Super Nova) |
| — | DF | LVA | Maksims Toņiševs (to Riga FC) |
| — | DF | LVA | Niks Sliede (to RFS) |
| — | DF | LVA | Emīls Birka (to Auda) |
| — | DF | LVA | Niks Dusalijevs (to Tukums 2000) |
| — | DF | JPN | Carlos Duke (to (Lithuania) FC Hegelmann) |
| — | DF | LVA | Roberts Veips (to Jelgava) |
| — | DF | LVA | Kristers Aļekseičiks (to Jelgava) |
| — | MF | LVA | Lūkass Vapne (loan return to Metta/LU) |
| — | MF | CRO | Branimir Cavar (loan return to (Croatia) Dubrava) |
| — | MF | LVA | Oļģerts Raščevskis (to Grobiņa) |
| — | MF | UKR | Andriy Korobenko (to Liepāja) |
| — | MF | SVN | Črt Rotar (to (Slovenia) Ilirija) |
| — | MF | LVA | Kristers Čudars (to Super Nova) |
| — | MF | LVA | Ralfs Kragliks (to Auda) |
| — | MF | LVA | Kristers Volkovs (to Tukums 2000) |
| — | MF | LVA | Kevins Cēsnieks (to Metta/LU) |
| — | MF | LVA | Kristers Penkevics (to Jelgava) |
| — | MF | LVA | Renārs Varslavāns (to Auda) |
| — | FW | SEN | Djibril Guèye (to Liepāja) |
| — | FW | SEN | Alioune Ndoye (on loan to (Switzerland) Servette) |
| — | FW | BRA | Lucas Aruba (to (Portugal) Santa Clara B) |
| — | FW | CGO | Jason Bahamboula (to (Canada) Wanderers) |
| — | FW | FRA | Jeremie Porsan-Clemente (to RFS) |
| — | FW | SEN | Meissa Diop (to Riga FC) |
| — | FW | LVA | Ingars Pūlis (to Tukums 2000) |

=== Daugavpils ===
In: Note: Flags indicate national team as defined under FIFA eligibility rules; some limited exceptions apply. Players may hold more than one non-FIFA nationality.

| No. | Pos. | Nation | Player |
|---|---|---|---|
| — | GK | LVA | Jānis Beks (from RFS) |
| — | DF | JPN | Shunsuke Murakami (Free agent) |
| — | DF | LVA | Dāvis Cucurs (from RFS) |
| — | DF | ENG | Wasiri Williams (from (England) Whitehawk) |
| — | MF | LVA | Edgars Ivanovs (from Liepāja) |
| — | MF | CGO | Taty Tchibinda (from RFS) |
| — | FW | LVA | Marks Pačepko (on loan from Liepāja) |
| — | FW | LVA | Kristiāns Kaušelis (from Tukums 2000) |
| — | FW | LVA | Valerijs Lizunovs (from RFS) |

Out: Note: Flags indicate national team as defined under FIFA eligibility rules; some limited exceptions apply. Players may hold more than one non-FIFA nationality.

| No. | Pos. | Nation | Player |
|---|---|---|---|
| — | GK | LVA | Frenks Orols (loan return to RFS) |
| — | GK | LVA | Ņikita Šaraņins (Released) |
| — | DF | LVA | Aleksandrs Molotkovs (to Liepāja) |
| — | DF | LVA | Aleksejs Valpēters (to (Czech Republic) Hanácká Slavia B) |
| — | MF | LVA | Oļģerts Raščevskis (loan return to Valmiera) |
| — | MF | LVA | Gļebs Žaleiko (to RFS) |
| — | MF | LVA | Artūrs Zjuzins (to (Norway) Nybergsund) |
| — | MF | LVA | Mareks Mikšto (Released) |
| — | MF | LVA | Ervīns Piņaskins (on loan to Augšdaugavas NSS) |
| — | FW | NGA | Lawrance Ugen (to (Lithuania) Atmosfera) |
| — | FW | LVA | Deniss Avdejevs (to Augšdaugavas NSS) |

=== Liepāja ===
In: Note: Flags indicate national team as defined under FIFA eligibility rules; some limited exceptions apply. Players may hold more than one non-FIFA nationality.

| No. | Pos. | Nation | Player |
|---|---|---|---|
| — | GK | LVA | Dāvis Ošs (from Valmiera) |
| — | GK | LVA | Iļja Isajevs (loan return from (Lithuania) Sirijus) |
| — | DF | UKR | Oleksandr Chernozub (loan return from Olaine) |
| — | DF | LVA | Aleksandrs Molotkovs (from BFC Daugavpils) |
| — | DF | LVA | Vjačeslavs Isajevs (from Auda) |
| — | DF | LVA | Vladislavs Sorokins (from (Kazakhstan) Kyzylzhar Petropavl) |
| — | DF | LVA | Kirils Iļjins (from Riga) |
| — | DF | LVA | Oskars Vientiess (from Metta/LU) |
| — | DF | LVA | Rūdolfs Meļķis (from Grobiņas SC/LFS) |
| — | MF | MTN | Amar Haidara (loan return from Jelgava) |
| — | MF | LVA | Edgars Ivanovs (loan return from Super Nova) |
| — | MF | UKR | Andriy Korobenko (from Valmiera) |
| — | MF | GUI | Amadou Traoré (from (Greece) Panachaiki) |
| — | FW | LVA | Armans Muradjans (loan return from Super Nova) |
| — | FW | SEN | Djibril Guèye (from Valmiera) |
| — | FW | LVA | Bruno Melnis (from Metta/LU) |
| — | FW | SUI | Tresor Samba (from (Switzerland) FC Thun) |
| — | FW | LVA | Marks Pačepko (from AFA Olaine) |
| — | FW | NGA | Joseph Oloko Ede (from Jelgava) |
| — | FW | CRO | Niko Domjanić (from (Croatia) Varaždin) |

Out: Note: Flags indicate national team as defined under FIFA eligibility rules; some limited exceptions apply. Players may hold more than one non-FIFA nationality.

| No. | Pos. | Nation | Player |
|---|---|---|---|
| — | GK | LVA | Vladislavs Lazarevs (to Grobiņas SC/LFS) |
| — | GK | LVA | Vladislavs Kurakins (to Riga Mariners) |
| — | DF | MNE | Luka Uskoković (to (Uzbekistan) Andijon) |
| — | DF | SEN | Papa Yare Fall (to (North Macedonia) Struga) |
| — | DF | UKR | Oleksandr Chernozub (on loan to (Lithuania) Džiugas) |
| — | DF | GEO | Nikoloz Chikovani (on loan to (Lithuania) Dainava) |
| — | DF | LVA | Alans Kangars (on loan to Metta/LU) |
| — | DF | LVA | Aleksandrs Molotkovs (on loan to Metta/LU) |
| — | DF | SEN | Cheikh Faye (to (Lithuania) Dainava) |
| — | MF | LVA | Eduards Tīdenbergs (to (Serbia) Dubočica) |
| — | MF | MTN | Amar Haidara (on loan to (Lithuania) Sūduva) |
| — | MF | LVA | Edgars Ivanovs (to Daugavpils) |
| — | FW | LVA | Artūrs Karašausks (to (Cambodia) Visakha) |
| — | FW | LVA | Marks Pačepko (on loan to BFC Daugavpils) |
| — | FW | LVA | Emīls Evelons (to Metta/LU) |
| — | FW | ARM | Aram Bahdasaryan (to (Lithuania) FC Džiugas) |
| — | FW | BIH | Almir Aganspahić (to (Kosovo) Gjilani) |

=== Metta ===
In: Note: Flags indicate national team as defined under FIFA eligibility rules; some limited exceptions apply. Players may hold more than one non-FIFA nationality.

| No. | Pos. | Nation | Player |
|---|---|---|---|
| — | GK | LVA | Kristers Gabriels Bite (on loan from Auda) |
| — | DF | LVA | Alans Kangars (on loan from Liepāja) |
| — | DF | LVA | Aleksandrs Molotkovs (on loan from Liepāja) |
| — | DF | BRA | Lauan (from (Brazil) Londrina) |
| — | MF | LVA | Lūkass Vapne (loan return from Valmiera) |
| — | MF | LVA | Rūdolfs Kļavinskis (promoted from Academy) |
| — | MF | LVA | Kevins Cēsinieks (from Valmiera) |
| — | MF | SLE | Mohamed Bai Kamara (from Skanste) |
| — | MF | SLE | Saymah Kamara (from Skanste) |
| — | FW | LVA | Emīls Evelons (from Liepāja) |
| — | FW | SLE | Abdul Bangura (from Skanste) |
| — | FW | NGA | Sadiq Saleh (from Skanste U19) |

Out: Note: Flags indicate national team as defined under FIFA eligibility rules; some limited exceptions apply. Players may hold more than one non-FIFA nationality.

| No. | Pos. | Nation | Player |
|---|---|---|---|
| — | DF | LVA | Jegors Novikovs (loan return to Auda) |
| — | DF | LVA | Mikus Vasiļevskis (Released) |
| — | DF | LVA | Oskars Vientiess (to Liepāja) |
| — | DF | LTU | Kristupas Keršys (to (Lithuania) Šiauliai, previously on loan) |
| — | DF | GHA | Yusif Yakubu (on loan to (Estonia) Harju) |
| — | DF | LVA | Rendijs Šibass (to RFS) |
| — | MF | UKR | Yevhen Stadnik (loan return to Riga II) |
| — | MF | LVA | Kristaps Grabovskis (loan return to Austria Wien II) |
| — | MF | USA | Jordan Bender (to (Sweden) AFC Eskilstuna) |
| — | MF | LVA | Daniils Ulimbaševs (to DSVK Traktors) |
| — | MF | LVA | Tomass Zants (to Super Nova) |
| — | MF | LVA | Emīls Aizpurietis (Released) |
| — | MF | UKR | Oleksandr Kurtsev (to (Lithuania) Džiugas) |
| — | MF | LVA | Lūkass Vapne (on loan to (Norway) Sogndal) |
| — | FW | SEN | Mohamet Lamine Correa (Released) |
| — | FW | LVA | Bruno Melnis (to Liepāja) |
| — | FW | LVA | Artjoms Puzirevskis (to (Italy) Nuova Sondrio) |
| — | FW | BRA | Vinícius de Souza Alves (to (Japan) Osaka) |

=== Tukums 2000 ===
In: Note: Flags indicate national team as defined under FIFA eligibility rules; some limited exceptions apply. Players may hold more than one non-FIFA nationality.

| No. | Pos. | Nation | Player |
|---|---|---|---|
| — | GK | LVA | Raivo Stūriņš (on loan from Auda) |
| — | DF | LVA | Maksims Semeško (from Riga II) |
| — | DF | LVA | Niks Dusalijevs (from Valmiera) |
| — | DF | LVA | Gļebs Kačanovs (from Jelgava) |
| — | MF | LVA | Dāvis Mārcis Valmiers (from Jelgava) |
| — | MF | LVA | Raivis Ķiršs (from (Poland) GKS Wikielec) |
| — | MF | LVA | Daniils Putrāns (from Riga II) |
| — | MF | LVA | Kristers Volkovs (from Valmiera) |
| — | MF | UKR | Artem Kholod (from Jelgava) |
| — | FW | LVA | Ingars Pūlis (from Valmiera) |
| — | FW | CMR | Benato Bekima (on loan from Riga) |

Out: Note: Flags indicate national team as defined under FIFA eligibility rules; some limited exceptions apply. Players may hold more than one non-FIFA nationality.

| No. | Pos. | Nation | Player |
|---|---|---|---|
| — | GK | LVA | Jānis Beks (loan return to RFS) |
| — | DF | LVA | Dāvis Cucurs (loan return to RFS) |
| — | DF | LVA | Maksims Sidorovs (to Grobiņas SC/LFS) |
| — | DF | SEN | Arona Fall (to (United Arab Emirates) United, later to Auda) |
| — | MF | JAM | Kenroy Campbell (loan return to RFS) |
| — | MF | LVA | Kristaps Kārlis Krieviņš (loan return to Riga II) |
| — | MF | CMR | Karl Gameni Wassom (loan return to Riga II) |
| — | MF | LVA | Vladimirs Stepanovs (to Super Nova) |
| — | FW | LVA | Valerijs Lizunovs (loan return to RFS) |
| — | FW | LVA | Kristiāns Kaušelis (to BFC Daugavpils) |

=== Grobiņa ===
In: Note: Flags indicate national team as defined under FIFA eligibility rules; some limited exceptions apply. Players may hold more than one non-FIFA nationality.

| No. | Pos. | Nation | Player |
|---|---|---|---|
| — | GK | LVA | Vladislavs Lazarevs (from Liepāja) |
| — | DF | LVA | Maksims Sidorovs (from Tukums 2000) |
| — | DF | FRA | Lucas Kouao (Free agent) |
| — | DF | SEN | Boris Tchamba (from (Oman) Sohar) |
| — | DF | BEL | Pie-Luxton Bekili (Free agent) |
| — | MF | LVA | Tomašs Mickēvičs (on loan from Riga II) |
| — | MF | LVA | Oļģerts Raščevskis (from Valmiera, was on loan at BFC Daugavpils) |
| — | MF | LVA | Gļebs Kļuškins (from Jelgava) |
| — | MF | NED | Gijs Steinfelder (from (Netherlands) Go Ahead Eagles U-21) |
| — | FW | UKR | Denys Halata (from (Ukraine) Kremin Kremenchuk, was on loan) |
| — | FW | IRN | Arwin Kalmarzy (from (Netherlands) VVV-Venlo II) |

Out: Note: Flags indicate national team as defined under FIFA eligibility rules; some limited exceptions apply. Players may hold more than one non-FIFA nationality.

| No. | Pos. | Nation | Player |
|---|---|---|---|
| — | GK | UKR | Artem Malysh (Released) |
| — | GK | LVA | Deins Polis (to Super Nova) |
| — | DF | LVA | Kārlis Mikuļskis (loan return to RFS) |
| — | DF | LVA | Rūdolfs Meļķis (to Liepāja) |
| — | DF | LVA | Raimonds Sāmietis (Released) |
| — | DF | LVA | Antons Tumanovs (Released) |
| — | MF | LVA | Kristers Čudars (loan return to Valmiera) |
| — | MF | LVA | Ingars Sarmis Stuglis (to Leevon PPK) |
| — | MF | LVA | Roberts Pirktiņš (Released) |
| — | MF | LVA | Andris Krušatins (Released) |
| — | MF | GNB | Helistano Ciro Manga (to (Iceland) Kormákur/Hvöt) |
| — | MF | AZE | Nazim Mammadzada (Released) |
| — | MF | COL | Dairon Mosquera (Released) |
| — | MF | LVA | Martins Raihs (to Liepāja II) |
| — | MF | LVA | Roberts Untulis (to Liepāja II) |
| — | FW | LVA | Markuss Kruglaužs (to Jelgava) |
| — | FW | COL | Diego Machado Renteria (Released) |

=== Super Nova ===
In: Note: Flags indicate national team as defined under FIFA eligibility rules; some limited exceptions apply. Players may hold more than one non-FIFA nationality.

| No. | Pos. | Nation | Player |
|---|---|---|---|
| — | GK | LVA | Frenks Orols (on loan from RFS, was on loan at BFC Daugavpils) |
| — | GK | LVA | Deins Polis (from Grobiņas SC/LFS) |
| — | GK | LVA | Dāvis Veisbuks (from Valmiera) |
| — | DF | LVA | Agris Glaudāns (from Jelgava) |
| — | DF | LVA | Linards Liepiņš (from Skanste) |
| — | DF | LVA | Mārcis Ošs (from RFS) |
| — | DF | LVA | Kristers Oto Augusts (from Alberts) |
| — | DF | SEN | Mouhamed Dione (from (United Arab Emirates) Elite Falcons) |
| — | DF | SEN | Hamidou Kanté (from (United Arab Emirates) Elite Falcons) |
| — | MF | LVA | Ralfs Šitjakovs (from Jelgava) |
| — | MF | LVA | Andris Deklavs (from Jelgava) |
| — | MF | LVA | Tomass Zants (from Metta) |
| — | MF | LVA | Kristers Čudars (from Valmiera, was on loan at Grobiņas SC/LFS) |
| — | MF | LVA | Jevgēņijs Miņins (from RFS) |
| — | MF | LVA | Kristaps Kļaviņš (from (Italy) Cosenza) |
| — | MF | LVA | Vladimirs Stepanovs (from Tukums 2000) |
| — | MF | LVA | Eduards Emsis (Free agent) |
| — | MF | CIV | Mamadou Sylla (on loan from RFS) |
| — | FW | LVA | Ņikita Ponomarjovs (from AFA Olaine) |
| — | FW | LVA | Ruslans Deružinskis (on loan from RFS-2) |
| — | MF | SEN | Abdoulaye Gueye (from (United Arab Emirates) Elite Falcons) |

Out: Note: Flags indicate national team as defined under FIFA eligibility rules; some limited exceptions apply. Players may hold more than one non-FIFA nationality.

| No. | Pos. | Nation | Player |
|---|---|---|---|
| — | GK | LVA | Kristers Gabriels Bite (to Auda) |
| — | GK | LVA | Nils Balagušs (to (Italy) Torino Academy) |
| — | GK | LVA | Konstantīns Maculevičs (Released) |
| — | GK | LVA | Norberts Armanovičs (to Mārupe) |
| — | DF | UKR | Dmytro Mamich (to Ogre United) |
| — | DF | LVA | Aleksandrs Butovskis (Released) |
| — | DF | LVA | Roberts Čevers (to Leevon PPK) |
| — | DF | SEN | Bilaly Diallo (Released) |
| — | DF | LVA | Linards Liepiņš (to Leevon PPK) |
| — | DF | LVA | Roberts Aleksejevs (to Olaine) |
| — | MF | LVA | Edgars Ivanovs (loan return to Liepāja) |
| — | MF | LVA | Klimentijs Manija (to Dinamo) |
| — | MF | LVA | Timurs Abramenko (to Ogre United) |
| — | MF | LVA | Ričards Penka (to Ogre United) |
| — | FW | LVA | Armans Muradjans (loan return to Liepāja) |
| — | FW | LVA | Haralds Silagailis (to Ogre United) |
| — | FW | LVA | Vladislavs Žihs (to Viola) |
| — | FW | LVA | Artjoms Deņisovs (Released) |
| — | | LVA | Rodrigo Maikls Ginters (to Leevon) |

=== Jelgava ===
In: Note: Flags indicate national team as defined under FIFA eligibility rules; some limited exceptions apply. Players may hold more than one non-FIFA nationality.

| No. | Pos. | Nation | Player |
|---|---|---|---|
| — | GK | CZE | Adam Dvořák (from (Czech Republic) SK Slavia Prague B) |
| — | DF | LVA | Roberts Veips (from Valmiera) |
| — | DF | LVA | Kristers Aļekseičiks (from Valmiera) |
| — | DF | CZE | Ondřej Ullman (on loan from (Czech Republic) FK Dukla Prague) |
| — | DF | CZE | Andriy Yuzvak (from (Czech Republic) FK Varnsdorf) |
| — | DF | NGA | Yahaya Muhammad (on loan from (Czech Republic) Karviná) |
| — | MF | LVA | Kristers Penkevics (from Valmiera) |
| — | MF | CZE | David Holoubek (from (Czech Republic) FC Sellier & Bellot Vlašim) |
| — | MF | LVA | Ēriks Boroduška (from (Italy) Livorno) |
| — | MF | LVA | Daniils Kašica (from Olaine) |
| — | FW | NGA | Promise Victor (from (Nigeria) Right2Win) |
| — | FW | LVA | Markuss Kruglaužs (from Grobiņa) |
| — | FW | BRA | Ismael Campos (Free agent) |
| — | FW | NGA | Kingsley Emenike (from (Czech Republic) Líšeň) |

Out: Note: Flags indicate national team as defined under FIFA eligibility rules; some limited exceptions apply. Players may hold more than one non-FIFA nationality.

| No. | Pos. | Nation | Player |
|---|---|---|---|
| — | GK | LVA | Vjačeslavs Kudrjavcevs (to (Germany) Phönix Lübeck) |
| — | DF | LVA | Ralfs Maslovs (to (Poland) Podbeskidzie Bielsko-Biała) |
| — | DF | LVA | Agris Glaudāns (to Super Nova) |
| — | DF | LVA | Gļebs Kačanovs (to Tukums 2000) |
| — | DF | UKR | Vladyslav Veremeev (to (Azerbaijan) Shamakhi) |
| — | DF | RWA | Dylan Maes (to (Georgia (country)) Samgurali) |
| — | MF | MTN | Amar Haidara (loan return to Liepāja) |
| — | MF | LVA | Dāvis Mārcis Valmiers (to Tukums 2000) |
| — | MF | LVA | Ralfs Šitjakovs (to Super Nova) |
| — | MF | LVA | Andris Deklavs (to Super Nova) |
| — | MF | LVA | Gļebs Kļuškins (to Grobiņas SC/LFS) |
| — | MF | JPN | Yasuhiro Hanada (to (Romania) Metalul Buzău) |
| — | MF | UKR | Yegor Glushach (to (Lithuania) TransINVEST) |
| — | MF | UKR | Artem Kholod (to Tukums 2000) |
| — | FW | NGA | Joseph Oloko Ede (to Liepāja) |

- Valmiera failed to obtain the necessary license for participation in the 2025 Latvian Higher League.

== Latvian First League ==
=== RFS-2 ===
In: Note: Flags indicate national team as defined under FIFA eligibility rules; some limited exceptions apply. Players may hold more than one non-FIFA nationality.

| No. | Pos. | Nation | Player |
|---|---|---|---|
| — | DF | LVA | Mārtiņš Bērziņš (from Super Nova II) |
| — | MF | LVA | Patriks Putniņš (from Alberts) |
| — | MF | LVA | Hugo Saulriets (from Alberts II) |
| — | MF | LVA | Mihails Kuliks (from Super Nova II) |
| — | MF | LVA | Damirs Onackis (from Super Nova II) |
| — | MF | LVA | Daniels Švecovs (from Super Nova II) |
| — | MF | BRA | Vitinho (from (Brazil) Atlético Mineiro) |
| — | FW | LVA | Rafaels Lūsis (from Leevon PPK) |

Out: Note: Flags indicate national team as defined under FIFA eligibility rules; some limited exceptions apply. Players may hold more than one non-FIFA nationality.

| No. | Pos. | Nation | Player |
|---|---|---|---|
| — | FW | LVA | Ruslans Deružinskis (on loan to Super Nova) |

=== Alberts ===
In: Note: Flags indicate national team as defined under FIFA eligibility rules; some limited exceptions apply. Players may hold more than one non-FIFA nationality.

| No. | Pos. | Nation | Player |
|---|---|---|---|
| — | MF | UKR | Matvii Marusii (from Mārupe) |
| — | MF | LVA | Deniss Stradiņš (from (Czech Republic) Varnsdorf) |
| — | | LVA | Gustavs Raudzeps (from Ādaži) |
| — | | LVA | Adrians Sproģis (from Vēsma) |

Out: Note: Flags indicate national team as defined under FIFA eligibility rules; some limited exceptions apply. Players may hold more than one non-FIFA nationality.

| No. | Pos. | Nation | Player |
|---|---|---|---|
| — | GK | LVA | Kristers Jānis Biščuhis (to Ogre United) |
| — | DF | LVA | Kristers Oto Augusts (to Super Nova) |
| — | DF | LVA | Kārlis Strautmanis (Released) |
| — | MF | LVA | Patriks Putniņš (to RFS II) |

=== Riga-2 ===
In: Note: Flags indicate national team as defined under FIFA eligibility rules; some limited exceptions apply. Players may hold more than one non-FIFA nationality.

| No. | Pos. | Nation | Player |
|---|---|---|---|
| — | MF | LVA | Kristaps Kārlis Krieviņš (loan return from Tukums 2000) |
| — | MF | UKR | Yevhen Stadnik (loan return from Metta) |
| — | MF | CMR | Karl Gameni Wassom (loan return from Tukums 2000) |
| — | FW | LVA | Markuss Eduards Blaubergs (from Valmiera II) |

Out: Note: Flags indicate national team as defined under FIFA eligibility rules; some limited exceptions apply. Players may hold more than one non-FIFA nationality.

| No. | Pos. | Nation | Player |
|---|---|---|---|
| — | GK | LVA | Ruslans Šemetovs (to Riga Mariners) |
| — | GK | LVA | Kārlis Keziks (to Olaine) |
| — | DF | LVA | Maksims Semeško (to Tukums 2000) |
| — | DF | LVA | Ņikita Fedosejevs (to Riga Mariners) |
| — | DF | LVA | Artjoms Lazarevs (to Riga Mariners) |
| — | DF | LVA | Ričards Janišs (to Riga Mariners) |
| — | DF | LVA | Andrejs Poļuhovičs (to Riga Mariners) |
| — | DF | UKR | Danylo Pikar (to Olaine) |
| — | MF | LVA | Tomašs Mickēvičs (on loan to Grobiņas SC/LFS) |
| — | MF | LVA | Daniils Putrāns (to Tukums 2000) |
| — | MF | UKR | Maksym Parkhomenko (to Riga Mariners) |
| — | MF | UKR | Yevhen Stadnik (to Riga Mariners) |
| — | MF | LVA | Ivans Gajalevs (to Riga Mariners) |
| — | MF | LVA | Vladimirs Kostigovs (to Riga Mariners) |
| — | MF | LVA | Rinalds Sola (to Riga Mariners) |
| — | MF | UKR | Nazar Prudchenko (to Riga Mariners) |
| — | MF | LVA | Ivans Galajevs (to Riga Mariners) |
| — | MF | LVA | Frančesko Ģirģens (to Riga Mariners) |
| — | MF | CMR | Karl Gameni Wassom (to Auda) |
| — | FW | UKR | Oleksandr Laptiev (to Olaine) |

=== Skanste ===
In: Note: Flags indicate national team as defined under FIFA eligibility rules; some limited exceptions apply. Players may hold more than one non-FIFA nationality.

| No. | Pos. | Nation | Player |
|---|---|---|---|
| — | MF | LVA | Daniels Dans Pētersons (from Ventspils) |
| — | MF | LVA | Emīls Gauris (from Alberts II) |
| — | MF | LVA | Oskars Likas (from Alberts II) |

Out: Note: Flags indicate national team as defined under FIFA eligibility rules; some limited exceptions apply. Players may hold more than one non-FIFA nationality.

| No. | Pos. | Nation | Player |
|---|---|---|---|
| — | GK | LVA | Maikls Rūmanis (to Leevon PPK) |
| — | DF | LVA | Linards Liepiņš (to Super Nova) |
| — | DF | LVA | Rikardo Jagodinskis (to (Estonia) Elva) |
| — | MF | LVA | Roberts Krūms (to Leevon PPK) |
| — | MF | MLI | Mahamadou Dembélé (to Ventspils) |
| — | MF | SLE | Mohamed Bai Kamara (to Metta) |
| — | MF | SLE | Saymah Kamara (to Metta) |
| — | FW | NGA | Edward Unuigbeje (to Ogre United) |
| — | FW | LVA | Viestards Gustavs Hibšmanis (to Leevon PPK) |
| — | FW | LVA | Dominiks Romenskis (to Leevon PPK) |
| — | FW | SLE | Abdul Bangura (to Metta) |

=== Mārupe ===
In: Note: Flags indicate national team as defined under FIFA eligibility rules; some limited exceptions apply. Players may hold more than one non-FIFA nationality.

| No. | Pos. | Nation | Player |
|---|---|---|---|
| — | GK | LVA | Norberts Armanovičs (from Super Nova) |
| — | DF | LVA | Reinis Krieviņš (from (Spain) Brea) |
| — | MF | UKR | Maksym Oliinyk (from Leevon PPK) |
| — | MF | LVA | Andrejs Kiriļins (from Leevon PPK) |
| — | MF | LVA | Kristers Lūsiņš (from Staiceles Bebri) |
| — | MF | LVA | Mārtiņš Cālītis (Free agent) |
| — | FW | LVA | Ņikita Žarovs (Free agent) |
| — | FW | LVA | Reinis Pāls (from (Spain) Polillas) |

Out: Note: Flags indicate national team as defined under FIFA eligibility rules; some limited exceptions apply. Players may hold more than one non-FIFA nationality.

| No. | Pos. | Nation | Player |
|---|---|---|---|
| — | GK | LVA | Valērijs Urigajevs (Released) |
| — | DF | UKR | Tymofii Marusii (to Ogre United) |
| — | DF | LVA | Guntis Griškovs (Released) |
| — | DF | LVA | Ēriks Kristsons (Released) |
| — | DF | LVA | Ralfs Sniedze (Released) |
| — | MF | UKR | Matvii Marusii (to Alberts) |
| — | MF | LVA | Martins Meiers (to (Switzerland) FC Wohlen) |
| — | MF | LVA | Ričards Buivids (Released) |
| — | MF | UKR | Yevhenii Kholmetskyi (Released) |
| — | MF | LVA | Ņikita Kokorevičs (Released) |
| — | MF | COD | Yousouf Rodo (to Ventspils) |
| — | MF | LVA | Maksims Molčanovs (Released) |
| — | FW | LVA | Georgijs Sačkovs (Released) |
| — | FW | LVA | Kirils Zaharovs (Released) |

=== Leevon PPK ===
In: Note: Flags indicate national team as defined under FIFA eligibility rules; some limited exceptions apply. Players may hold more than one non-FIFA nationality.

| No. | Pos. | Nation | Player |
|---|---|---|---|
| — | GK | LVA | Maikls Rūmanis (from Skanste) |
| — | DF | LVA | Aleksandrs Baturinskis (Free agent) |
| — | DF | LVA | Roberts Čevers (from Super Nova) |
| — | DF | LVA | Linards Liepiņš (from Super Nova) |
| — | DF | LVA | Niklāvs Treimanis (from Aliance) |
| — | MF | LVA | Roberts Krūms (from Skanste) |
| — | MF | LVA | Ingars Sarmis Stuglis (from Grobiņa) |
| — | FW | LVA | Viestards Gustavs Hibšmanis (from Skanste) |
| — | FW | LVA | Dominiks Romenskis (from Skanste) |
| — | | LVA | Rodrigo Maikls Ginters (from Super Nova) |

Out: Note: Flags indicate national team as defined under FIFA eligibility rules; some limited exceptions apply. Players may hold more than one non-FIFA nationality.

| No. | Pos. | Nation | Player |
|---|---|---|---|
| — | GK | LVA | Dmitrijs Grigorjevs (to Ogre United) |
| — | DF | LVA | Oskars Deaks (Released) |
| — | DF | LVA | Rainers Tomass Urujevs (to Riga Mariners) |
| — | MF | UKR | Maksym Oliinyk (to Mārupe) |
| — | MF | UKR | Mykyta Tatkov (Released) |
| — | MF | LVA | Andrejs Kiriļins (to Mārupe) |
| — | FW | LVA | Renē Baumanis (to (Switzerland) FC Wohlen) |
| — | FW | LVA | Rafaels Lūsis (to RFS II) |

=== Olaine ===
In: Note: Flags indicate national team as defined under FIFA eligibility rules; some limited exceptions apply. Players may hold more than one non-FIFA nationality.

| No. | Pos. | Nation | Player |
|---|---|---|---|
| — | GK | LVA | Kārlis Keziks (from Riga II) |
| — | DF | LVA | Artūrs Gorodnickis (from Salaspils) |
| — | DF | LVA | Roberts Aleksejevs (from Super Nova) |
| — | DF | ISR | Oskar Bidzhiev (from Salaspils) |
| — | DF | UKR | Danylo Pikar (from Riga II) |
| — | MF | LVA | Māris Bērziņš (from Krimulda) |
| — | MF | LVA | Kārlis Tomass-Polis (from Babīte) |
| — | MF | NGA | Chibuike Nworah (from (Nigeria) Olive Charles) |
| — | MF | PER | Guillermo Ferrari (Free agent) |
| — | MF | LVA | Kristiāns Kotovs (from Jelgava II) |
| — | FW | LVA | Konstantīns Fjodorovs (from Ogre United) |
| — | FW | UKR | Oleksandr Laptiev (from Riga II) |
| — | FW | LVA | Edgars Pavļenko (from (Italy) Livorno) |
| — | FW | LVA | Kristians Sergejs Černovs (from Super Nova II) |
| — | FW | NGA | Sherif Imonikhe (from (Nigeria) Ojodu City) |

Out: Note: Flags indicate national team as defined under FIFA eligibility rules; some limited exceptions apply. Players may hold more than one non-FIFA nationality.

| No. | Pos. | Nation | Player |
|---|---|---|---|
| — | DF | UKR | Oleksandr Chernozub (loan return to Liepāja) |
| — | DF | LVA | Daniels Nosegbe Suško (to (Lithuania) Džiugas) |
| — | MF | LVA | Daniils Kašica (to Jelgava) |
| — | MF | LVA | Edijs Bokāns (to Riga Mariners) |
| — | FW | LVA | Marks Pačepko (to Liepāja) |
| — | FW | LVA | Ņikita Ponomarjovs (to Super Nova) |

=== JFK Ventspils ===
In: Note: Flags indicate national team as defined under FIFA eligibility rules; some limited exceptions apply. Players may hold more than one non-FIFA nationality.

| No. | Pos. | Nation | Player |
|---|---|---|---|
| — | DF | FRA | Baboye Gueye (from (Italy) Maratea) |
| — | DF | CHA | Ebenezer Ngardial (Free agent) |
| — | MF | FRA | Yasin Essennouni (from (Italy) Maratea) |
| — | MF | COD | Yousouf Rodo (from Mārupe) |
| — | MF | MLI | Mahamadou Dembélé (from Skanste) |
| — | FW | NGA | Augustinne Okeke (from (Nigeria) Early Start) |
| — | | LVA | Andrejs Runģis (from Super Nova Youth) |

Out: Note: Flags indicate national team as defined under FIFA eligibility rules; some limited exceptions apply. Players may hold more than one non-FIFA nationality.

| No. | Pos. | Nation | Player |
|---|---|---|---|
| — | DF | USA | Wildjeff Fileus (Released) |
| — | MF | COL | Maifer Obregon (Released) |
| — | MF | LVA | Daniels Dans Pētersons (to Skanste) |
| — | MF | LVA | Renāts Romanovskis (to Tukums II) |
| — | FW | COL | Sebastian Mosquera (Released) |

=== Ogre United ===
In: Note: Flags indicate national team as defined under FIFA eligibility rules; some limited exceptions apply. Players may hold more than one non-FIFA nationality.

| No. | Pos. | Nation | Player |
|---|---|---|---|
| — | GK | LVA | Dmitrijs Grigorjevs (from Leevon PPK) |
| — | GK | LVA | Kristers Jānis Biščuhis (from Alberts) |
| — | DF | LVA | Krišs Kārkliņš (from Auda) |
| — | DF | UKR | Tymofii Marusii (from Mārupe) |
| — | DF | UKR | Dmytro Mamich (from Super Nova) |
| — | DF | JPN | Kaito Kumakura (from Ķekava/Auda) |
| — | MF | LVA | Timurs Abramenko (from Super Nova) |
| — | MF | LVA | Ričards Penka (from Super Nova) |
| — | FW | NGA | Edward Unuigbeje (from Skanste) |
| — | FW | LVA | Kristofers Jamonts (from (Slovakia) Tatran) |
| — | FW | UKR | Vadym Mashchenko (from (Slovakia) Humenné) |
| — | FW | LVA | Haralds Silagailis (from Super Nova) |

Out: Note: Flags indicate national team as defined under FIFA eligibility rules; some limited exceptions apply. Players may hold more than one non-FIFA nationality.

| No. | Pos. | Nation | Player |
|---|---|---|---|
| — | FW | LVA | Konstantīns Fjodorovs (to AFA Olaine) |

=== Tukums 2000-2 ===
In: Note: Flags indicate national team as defined under FIFA eligibility rules; some limited exceptions apply. Players may hold more than one non-FIFA nationality.

| No. | Pos. | Nation | Player |
|---|---|---|---|
| — | MF | LVA | Renāts Romanovskis (from Ventspils) |

Out: Note: Flags indicate national team as defined under FIFA eligibility rules; some limited exceptions apply. Players may hold more than one non-FIFA nationality.

| No. | Pos. | Nation | Player |

=== Augšdaugavas NSS ===
In: Note: Flags indicate national team as defined under FIFA eligibility rules; some limited exceptions apply. Players may hold more than one non-FIFA nationality.

| No. | Pos. | Nation | Player |
|---|---|---|---|
| — | GK | LVA | Renārs Minuss (from Valmiera II) |
| — | MF | GEO | Saba Kharchilava (from (Czech Republic) Slavia) |
| — | MF | LVA | Ervīns Piņaskins (on loan from Daugavpils) |
| — | MF | GHA | Daniel Quaye (Free agent) |
| — | FW | LVA | Deniss Avdejevs (from Daugavpils) |

Out: Note: Flags indicate national team as defined under FIFA eligibility rules; some limited exceptions apply. Players may hold more than one non-FIFA nationality.

| No. | Pos. | Nation | Player |
|---|---|---|---|
| — | GK | UKR | Maksym Parshykov (to (Kyrgyzstan) Talant) |

=== Riga Mariners ===
In: Note: Flags indicate national team as defined under FIFA eligibility rules; some limited exceptions apply. Players may hold more than one non-FIFA nationality.

| No. | Pos. | Nation | Player |
|---|---|---|---|
| — | GK | LVA | Vladislavs Kurakins (from Liepāja) |
| — | GK | LVA | Ruslans Šemetovs (from Riga II) |
| — | DF | LVA | Rainers Tomass Urujevs (from Leevon PPK) |
| — | DF | LVA | Ņikita Fedosejevs (from Riga II) |
| — | DF | LVA | Artjoms Lazarevs (from Riga II) |
| — | DF | LVA | Ričards Janišs (from Riga II) |
| — | DF | LVA | Andrejs Poļuhovičs (from Riga II) |
| — | MF | UKR | Maksym Parkhomenko (from Riga II) |
| — | MF | UKR | Yevhen Stadnik (from Riga II) |
| — | MF | LVA | Ivans Galajevs (from Riga II) |
| — | MF | LVA | Vladimirs Kostigovs (from Riga II) |
| — | MF | LVA | Rinalds Sola (from Riga II) |
| — | MF | UKR | Nazar Prudchenko (from Riga II) |
| — | MF | LVA | Edijs Bokāns (from Olaine) |
| — | MF | LVA | Frančesko Ģirģens (from Riga II) |
| — | MF | LVA | Artjoms Zamullo (from Salaspils) |
| — | FW | LVA | Eduards Višņakovs (Free agent) |
| — | FW | LVA | Kārlis Patriks Lībietis (from Smiltene) |
| — | FW | LVA | Artūrs Ostapenko (from (Czech Republic) Robstav) |
| — | FW | LVA | Matīss Caune (from Super Nova II) |

Out: Note: Flags indicate national team as defined under FIFA eligibility rules; some limited exceptions apply. Players may hold more than one non-FIFA nationality.

| No. | Pos. | Nation | Player |
|---|---|---|---|
| — | GK | UKR | Oleh Chernopolskyi (to (Poland) Granica) |
| — | DF | LVA | Antons Kurakins (Released) |
| — | DF | LVA | Deniss Silajevs-Kožurovs (Released) |
| — | DF | LVA | Vitālijs Smirnovs (Released) |
| — | DF | LVA | Aleksandrs Solovjovs (Released) |
| — | DF | LVA | Viktors Golovizins (Released) |
| — | DF | LVA | Vladislavs Mihailovs (Released) |
| — | MF | LVA | Alekss Regža (Released) |
| — | MF | LVA | Aleksandrs Zeņkovs (Released) |
| — | MF | UKR | Dmytro Androsov (Released) |
| — | MF | LVA | Vladislavs Grigjans (Released) |
| — | FW | LVA | Gļebs Cvetkovs (Released) |

=== Smiltene ===
In: Note: Flags indicate national team as defined under FIFA eligibility rules; some limited exceptions apply. Players may hold more than one non-FIFA nationality.

| No. | Pos. | Nation | Player |
|---|---|---|---|
| — | GK | LVA | Haralds Kalniņš (from Valmiera II) |
| — | DF | LVA | Ernests Kalniņš (from Valmiera II) |
| — | DF | LVA | Rodžers Krasts (from Valmiera II) |
| — | MF | LVA | Ēriks Maurs-Boks (from Valmiera II) |
| — | MF | LVA | Ritvars Krists Zauska (from Valmiera II) |
| — | FW | LVA | Oskars Stupelis (from Valmiera II) |

Out: Note: Flags indicate national team as defined under FIFA eligibility rules; some limited exceptions apply. Players may hold more than one non-FIFA nationality.

| No. | Pos. | Nation | Player |
|---|---|---|---|
| — | MF | LVA | Mārcis Ērglis (to Valmiera) |
| — | FW | LVA | Kārlis Patriks Lībietis (to Riga Mariners) |
| — | FW | LVA | Elvis Teremko (Released) |

=== Rēzekne ===
In: Note: Flags indicate national team as defined under FIFA eligibility rules; some limited exceptions apply. Players may hold more than one non-FIFA nationality.

| No. | Pos. | Nation | Player |
|---|---|---|---|
| — | DF | LVA | Raivis Hščanovičs (Free agent) |
| — | MF | GEO | Tsotne Beglarashvili (from (Slovakia) Nádszeg) |
| — | MF | GHA | Ibrahim Rahman (from (Ghana) Volta Rangers) |
| — | FW | JPN | Sho Aogaki (from (Japan) Arterivo) |
| — | FW | FRA | Aly Sako (from (France) ASPTT Dijon) |

Out: Note: Flags indicate national team as defined under FIFA eligibility rules; some limited exceptions apply. Players may hold more than one non-FIFA nationality.

| No. | Pos. | Nation | Player |
|---|---|---|---|
| — | DF | GEO | Giorgi Bakuradze (Released) |
| — | MF | COL | Kevin Andrade (Released) |
| — | FW | GRN | Oluwagbohunmi Odusanya (Released) |
| — | FW | NGA | Job Okpanachi (to (Lithuania) Panevėžys) |
