= List of Latvian football transfers summer 2022 =

This is a list of Latvian football transfers in the summer transfer window 2022 by club. Only clubs of the 2022 Latvian Higher League are included.

== Latvian Higher League ==
=== RFS ===
In: Note: Flags indicate national team as defined under FIFA eligibility rules; some limited exceptions apply. Players may hold more than one non-FIFA nationality.

No.	Pos.	Nation	Player
—	GK	LAT	Pāvels Šteinbors (from (Poland) Jagiellonia Białystok)
—	DF	SRB	Jovan Vlalukin (from (Serbia) Metalac Gornji Milanovac)
—	MF	SRB	Stefan Cvetković (from (Serbia) Metalac Gornji Milanovac)
—	MF	SRB	Stefan Panić (from (Cyprus) Pafos)
—	MF	LAT	Dmitrijs Zelenkovs (from (Italy) Montespaccato Savoia Calcio)
—	MF	BRA	Bill (on loan from (Ukraine) Dnipro-1)
—	MF	AUT	Tomáš Šimkovič (from (Austria) First Vienna)
—	FW	BRA	Léo Gaúcho (from (United Arab Emirates) Dibba Al Hisn, later loaned to Spartaks Jūrmala)

Out: Note: Flags indicate national team as defined under FIFA eligibility rules; some limited exceptions apply. Players may hold more than one non-FIFA nationality.

No.	Pos.	Nation	Player
—	DF	LAT	Jānis Krautmanis (on loan to Tukums 2000)
—	MF	RUS	Vladislav Galkin (loan return to (Russia) Dynamo Moscow)
—	MF	LAT	Ņikita Pašņevs (to (Italy) Trapani 1905)
—	MF	SRB	Stefan Cvetković (on loan to (Serbia) Radnički Niš)
—	FW	BRA	Léo Gaúcho (on loan to Spartaks Jūrmala)
—	FW	BLR	Aleksandr Shestyuk (loan return to (Russia) Nizhny Novgorod)

=== Valmiera FC ===
In: Note: Flags indicate national team as defined under FIFA eligibility rules; some limited exceptions apply. Players may hold more than one non-FIFA nationality.

No.	Pos.	Nation	Player
—	GK	LAT	Rūdolfs Soloha (from (Poland) Miedź Legnica)
—	MF	LAT	Vladimirs Stepanovs (loan return from SK Super Nova, later to FK Auda)
—	MF	LAT	Lūkass Vapne (on loan from Metta/LU)
—	MF	UKR	Artur Murza (from (Ukraine) Metalist Kharkiv)
—	MF	POR	Jorge Teixeira (loan return from (Portugal) Covilhã)
—	MF	PLE	Mohammed Direya (from (Palestine) Shabab Al-Khalil)

Out: Note: Flags indicate national team as defined under FIFA eligibility rules; some limited exceptions apply. Players may hold more than one non-FIFA nationality.

No.	Pos.	Nation	Player
—	GK	LAT	Vjačeslavs Kudrjavcevs (to FK Liepāja)
—	MF	LAT	Vladimirs Stepanovs (to FK Auda)
—	MF	LAT	Kristers Neilands (on loan to Tukums 2000)
—	FW	LAT	Kristiāns Kaušelis (on loan to Tukums 2000)

=== Liepāja ===
In: Note: Flags indicate national team as defined under FIFA eligibility rules; some limited exceptions apply. Players may hold more than one non-FIFA nationality.

No.	Pos.	Nation	Player
—	GK	LAT	Vjačeslavs Kudrjavcevs (from Valmiera FC)
—	DF	BIH	Kenan Hreljić (from (Bosnia and Herzegovina) Igman Konjic)
—	DF	SRB	Slaviša Radović (from (Bosnia and Herzegovina) Velež)
—	DF	COD	Gauthier Mankenda (from (Kosovo) Prishtina)
—	DF	ANG	Inácio Miguel (from (Portugal) Mafra)
—	DF	USA	Noah Toribio (from (Greece) Ierapetra)
—	DF	UKR	Yurii Mate (free agent)
—	MF	LAT	Igors Tarasovs (from (Cyprus) Ethnikos Achna)
—	MF	LAT	Gļebs Kļuškins (from Metta/LU)
—	MF	SLO	Nik Kapun (from (Slovenia) Olimpija Ljubljana)
—	MF	LAT	Aleksejs Grjaznovs (from (Armenia) Noah)
—	MF	ALB	Ardit Deliu (from (Albania) Laçi)
—	FW	BEL	Jordy Soladio (from (Luxembourg) Victoria Rosport)

Out: Note: Flags indicate national team as defined under FIFA eligibility rules; some limited exceptions apply. Players may hold more than one non-FIFA nationality.

No.	Pos.	Nation	Player
—	GK	SRB	Luka Radotić (to (Serbia) OFK Beograd)
—	DF	LAT	Vjačeslavs Isajevs (to Riga, later loaned to FK Auda)
—	DF	MNE	Marko Simić (to (Montenegro) Budućnost)
—	MF	SEN	Seydina Keita (to (Lithuania) Panevėžys)
—	MF	LAT	Daniils Hvoiņickis (to Spartaks Jūrmala)
—	MF	UKR	Yuriy Tkachuk (to (Poland) Ursus Warszawa)
—	MF	NGR	Hogan Ukpa (to (North Macedonia) FC Struga)
—	MF	ALB	Ardit Deliu (to (Albania) Tirana)
—	MF	LAT	Igors Tarasovs (to (Cyprus) Krasava Eny Ypsonas)
—	FW	LAT	Marks Kurtišs (to Grobiņas SC)
—	FW	BLR	Mikhail Gordeichuk (to (Belarus) FC Dynamo Brest)
—	FW	LAT	Artūrs Karašausks (to (Cyprus) Krasava Eny Ypsonas)

=== Riga ===
In: Note: Flags indicate national team as defined under FIFA eligibility rules; some limited exceptions apply. Players may hold more than one non-FIFA nationality.

No.	Pos.	Nation	Player
—	GK	LAT	Dāvis Ošs (from Spartaks Jūrmala)
—	DF	SWE	Doug Bergqvist (from (Ukraine) Chornomorets Odesa)
—	DF	LAT	Jegors Novikovs (from Metta/LU, later loaned to FK Auda)
—	DF	LAT	Iļja Korotkovs (loan return from FK Auda)
—	DF	SEN	Mouhammed Ngom (from FK Auda)
—	DF	LAT	Vjačeslavs Isajevs (from Liepāja, later loaned to FK Auda)
—	DF	CRO	Hrvoje Babec (from (Croatia) Gorica)
—	DF	PER	Gustavo Dulanto (from (Moldova) Sheriff Tiraspol)
—	MF	NGR	Alexander Olabanjo Ogunji (from FK Auda)
—	MF	RUS	Danila Yanov (loan return from (Russia) Forte Taganrog)
—	MF	LAT	Artūrs Krancmanis (loan return from FK Auda, later loaned to Spartaks Jūrmala)
—	MF	NGR	Abiodun Ogunniyi (from Spartaks Jūrmala, later loaned to FK Auda)
—	MF	FRA	Mohamed Ouadah (from (France) Dunkerque)
—	MF	NED	Navarone Foor (from (Cyprus) Pafoc)
—	FW	BRA	Douglas Aurélio (on loan from (Cyprus) Pafos)
—	FW	FRA	Brice Tutu (from FK Auda)
—	FW	ARG	Marcelo Torres (on loan from (Cyprus) Pafos, was loaned to (Cyprus) Akritas Chlorakas)
—	FW	BRA	Lucas Rangel (from (Ukraine) Vorskla Poltava, was loaned to (Azerbaijan) Sabah)

Out: Note: Flags indicate national team as defined under FIFA eligibility rules; some limited exceptions apply. Players may hold more than one non-FIFA nationality.

No.	Pos.	Nation	Player
—	GK	LAT	Iļja Isajevs (on loan to Spartaks Jūrmala)
—	DF	AUT	Christoph Martschinko (to (Austria) SV Lebring)
—	DF	LAT	Jegors Novikovs (on loan to FK Auda)
—	DF	SRB	Miloš Vranjanin (to (Hungary) Kisvárda)
—	DF	LAT	Vjačeslavs Isajevs (on loan to FK Auda)
—	DF	LAT	Artūrs Krancmanis (on loan to Spartaks Jūrmala, was on loan to FK Auda)
—	MF	LAT	Raivis Ķiršs (on loan to FK Auda)
—	MF	NGR	Abiodun Ogunniyi (on loan to FK Auda)
—	MF	MAR	Karim Loukili (to (Hungary) Debreceni)
—	MF	BRA	Wesley Natã (to (Russia) Rodina)
—	MF	UKR	Vladlen Yurchenko (to (Ukraine) Vorskla)
—	FW	FRA	Jean-Baptiste Léo (to (Greece) PAS Giannina)
—	FW	BUL	Georgi Minchev (on loan to FK Auda)

=== Spartaks Jūrmala ===
In: Note: Flags indicate national team as defined under FIFA eligibility rules; some limited exceptions apply. Players may hold more than one non-FIFA nationality.

No.	Pos.	Nation	Player
—	GK	LAT	Iļja Isajevs (on loan from Riga)
—	DF	LAT	Aleksandrs Solovjovs (from FK Auda)
—	DF	NGR	Saminu Abdullahi (loan return from (Russia) Veles Moscow)
—	MF	UKR	Yaroslav Terekhov (from (Ukraine) Enerhiya Nova Kakhovka)
—	MF	LAT	Deniss Rogovs (from FK Auda)
—	MF	LAT	Artūrs Krancmanis (on loan from Riga, was on loan to FK Auda)
—	MF	FIN	Adam Markhiyev (loan return from (Italy) SPAL)
—	MF	ALG	Heythem Kerbache (loan return from (Italy) AC Siena)
—	MF	LAT	Daniils Hvoiņickis (from Liepāja)
—	FW	LAT	Daniils Skopenko (free agent)
—	FW	BRA	Léo Gaúcho (on loan from RFS)
—	FW	CAN	Richard Ennin (loan return from (Russia) Nizhny Novgorod, later loaned to (Hungary) Honvéd)
—	FW	NGR	Sunday Akinbule (loan return from (Malta) Mosta FC)
—	FW	NGR	Richard Friday (loan return from (Sweden) GAIS)

Out: Note: Flags indicate national team as defined under FIFA eligibility rules; some limited exceptions apply. Players may hold more than one non-FIFA nationality.

No.	Pos.	Nation	Player
—	GK	LAT	Dāvis Ošs (to Riga)
—	DF	LAT	Ņikita Koļinko (to SK Super Nova)
—	DF	LAT	Kristers Atars (to SK Super Nova)
—	DF	LAT	Rikardo Jagodinskis (to SK Super Nova)
—	DF	LAT	Mārcis Ošs (released)
—	MF	LAT	Aļģirdas Gražis (to SK Super Nova)
—	MF	NGR	Abiodun Ogunniyi (to Riga, later loaned to FK Auda)
—	MF	LAT	Kristaps Puzānovs (to Tukums 2000)
—	MF	LAT	Kristians Godiņš (released)
—	MF	CRO	Tin Vukmanić (to (Croatia) NK Rudeš)
—	FW	CAN	Richard Ennin (on loan at (Hungary) Honvéd, was on loan at (Russia) Nizhny Novgorod)
—	FW	CMR	Leonel Wamba (to (Algeria) CR Belouizdad)
—	FW	LAT	Daniils Skopenko (to (Luxembourg) Racing Union)

=== BFC Daugavpils ===
In: Note: Flags indicate national team as defined under FIFA eligibility rules; some limited exceptions apply. Players may hold more than one non-FIFA nationality.

No.	Pos.	Nation	Player
—	DF	LAT	Dmitrijs Litvinskis (from Ventspils)

Out: Note: Flags indicate national team as defined under FIFA eligibility rules; some limited exceptions apply. Players may hold more than one non-FIFA nationality.

No.	Pos.	Nation	Player
—	MF	AZE	Asim Alizada (loan return to (Azerbaijan) Neftci)
—	MF	AZE	Shakir Seyidov (loan return to (Azerbaijan) Sabah)
—	FW	CMR	William Mukwelle (on loan to FK Auda)

=== Metta ===
In: Note: Flags indicate national team as defined under FIFA eligibility rules; some limited exceptions apply. Players may hold more than one non-FIFA nationality.

No.	Pos.	Nation	Player
—	DF	CRO	Ivan Harambašić (free agent)
—	MF	LTU	Kristupas Keršys (from (Germany) Werder Bremen U-19)
—	FW	CMR	Jean Mbassi (from (Cameroon) Njalla Quan SA)
—	FW	SEN	Mohamet Lamine Correa (from (Senegal) AS Pikine)

Out: Note: Flags indicate national team as defined under FIFA eligibility rules; some limited exceptions apply. Players may hold more than one non-FIFA nationality.

No.	Pos.	Nation	Player
—	DF	LAT	Jegors Novikovs (to Riga)
—	MF	LAT	Gļebs Kļuškins (to Liepāja)
—	MF	LAT	Lūkass Vapne (on loan to Valmiera FC)
—	MF	GHA	Christian Awlesu (released)
—	FW	NGR	Yunusa Owolabi Muritala (to (Malta) Hibernians F.C.)

=== FK Auda ===
In: Note: Flags indicate national team as defined under FIFA eligibility rules; some limited exceptions apply. Players may hold more than one non-FIFA nationality.

No.	Pos.	Nation	Player
—	GK	LAT	Kaspars Ribaks (from FK Ķekava 2011)
—	DF	GER	Niko Bretschneider (from (Germany) MSV Duisburg)
—	DF	LAT	Jegors Novikovs (on loan from Riga)
—	DF	LAT	Vjačeslavs Isajevs (on loan from Riga)
—	DF	GER	Kilian Senkbeil (from (Germany) ZFC Meuselwitz)
—	MF	LAT	Vladimirs Stepanovs (from Valmiera FC)
—	MF	LAT	Raivis Ķiršs (on loan from Riga)
—	MF	NGR	Abiodun Ogunniyi (on loan from Riga)
—	FW	BUL	Georgi Minchev (on loan from Riga)
—	FW	CMR	William Mukwelle (on loan from Daugavpils)
—	FW	CIV	Aboubakar Karamoko (from (Cyprus) Ermis Aradippou FC)

Out: Note: Flags indicate national team as defined under FIFA eligibility rules; some limited exceptions apply. Players may hold more than one non-FIFA nationality.

No.	Pos.	Nation	Player
—	DF	LAT	Aleksandrs Solovjovs (to Spartaks Jūrmala)
—	DF	LAT	Iļja Korotkovs (loan return to Riga)
—	DF	SEN	Mouhammed Ngom (to Riga)
—	DF	CRO	Marko Stolnik (loan return to (Croatia) Varaždin)
—	DF	UKR	Oleksandr Kaplienko (to (Ukraine) Metalist)
—	DF	BRA	João Menezes (released)
—	MF	LAT	Bogdans Samoilovs (to Tukums 2000)
—	MF	NGR	Alexander Olabanjo Ogunji (to Riga)
—	MF	LAT	Deniss Rogovs (to Spartaks Jūrmala)
—	MF	LAT	Artūrs Krancmanis (loan return to Riga, later loaned to Spartaks Jūrmala)
—	FW	FRA	Brice Tutu (to Riga)
—	FW	CRO	Tomislav Štrkalj (loan return to (Portugal) Tondela)

=== FK Tukums 2000 ===
In: Note: Flags indicate national team as defined under FIFA eligibility rules; some limited exceptions apply. Players may hold more than one non-FIFA nationality.

No.	Pos.	Nation	Player
—	DF	LAT	Jānis Krautmanis (on loan from RFS)
—	DF	LAT	Maksims Sidorovs (from SK Super Nova)
—	MF	LAT	Kristers Neilands (on loan from Valmiera FC)
—	MF	LAT	Bogdans Samoilovs (from FK Auda)
—	MF	LAT	Kristaps Puzānovs (from Spartaks Jūrmala)
—	FW	LAT	Kristiāns Kaušelis (on loan from Valmiera FC)

Out: Note: Flags indicate national team as defined under FIFA eligibility rules; some limited exceptions apply. Players may hold more than one non-FIFA nationality.

No.	Pos.	Nation	Player
—	DF	LAT	Kristers Lībeks (to Grobiņas SC)
—	MF	LAT	Robins Kokarītis (released)
—	FW	LAT	Daniels Mīļais (released)
—	FW	LAT	Aleksejs Davidenkovs (released)
—	FW	LAT	Dīvs Rīns (released)

=== SK Super Nova ===
In: Note: Flags indicate national team as defined under FIFA eligibility rules; some limited exceptions apply. Players may hold more than one non-FIFA nationality.

No.	Pos.	Nation	Player
—	DF	LAT	Ņikita Koļinko (from Spartaks Jūrmala)
—	DF	UKR	Yehor Smirnov (from (Lithuania) FC Neptūnas)
—	DF	LAT	Kristers Atars (from Spartaks Jūrmala)
—	DF	LAT	Rikardo Jagodinskis (from Spartaks Jūrmala)
—	MF	LAT	Aļģirdas Gražis (from Spartaks Jūrmala)
—	MF	UKR	Yevhenii Terzi (from (Montenegro) FK Podgorica)
—	FW	LAT	Eduards Višņakovs (from (Poland) GKS Wikielec)

Out: Note: Flags indicate national team as defined under FIFA eligibility rules; some limited exceptions apply. Players may hold more than one non-FIFA nationality.

No.	Pos.	Nation	Player
—	DF	LAT	Edgars Šakurovs (released)
—	DF	LAT	Maksims Sidorovs (to Tukums 2000)
—	MF	LAT	Dāvis Indrāns (to JDFS Alberts)
—	MF	LAT	Alekss Regža (to Beitar)
—	MF	LAT	Vladimirs Stepanovs (loan return to Valmiera FC)
—	FW	AZE	Vugar Asgarov (to PPK/Betsafe)
—	FW	LAT	Artjoms Troickis (to AFA Olaine)
