= Gustavo Silva (footballer, born 2002) =

Brazilian footballer (born 2003)

Personal information
- Full name: Gustavo Silva Souza
- Date of birth: 3 January 2002 (age 24)
- Place of birth: Belo Horizonte, Brazil
- Height: 1.76 m (5 ft 9 in)
- Position: Midfielder

Team information
- Current team: Botafogo-PB
- Number: 32

Youth career
- Guarani
- Linense
- 2020–2022: Internacional

Senior career*
Years	Team	Apps	(Gls)
2019	Linense	0	(0)
2023–2024	Valmiera	53	(6)
2023	Valmiera II	3	(0)
2025	Ituano	9	(0)
2026	Serra Branca	11	(2)
2026–	Botafogo-PB	19	(1)
- * Club domestic league appearances and goals as of 19:35, 19 November 2026 (UTC)

Gustavo Silva Souza (born 3 January 2002), known as Gustavo Silva or just Gustavo, is a Brazilian professional footballer who plays as a midfielder for Botafogo-PB.

== Career ==
Born in Belo Horizonte, Minas Gerais, Gustavo made his senior debut with Linense in the 2019 Copa Paulista before joining the youth categories of Internacional in the following year. On 26 February 2023, he left the club and joined Valmiera in Latvia.

On 13 March 2025, Gustavo returned to his home country after being announced at Série C side Ituano. On 17 October, he moved to Serra Branca for the upcoming season.

On 26 March 2026, Gustavo returned to the third division after signing for Botafogo-PB.

== Career statistics ==
As of 19 November 2026

Appearances and goals by club, season and competition
Club	Season	League			State league		Cup		Continental		Other		Total	
Club	Season	Division	Apps	Goals	Apps	Goals	Apps	Goals	Apps	Goals	Apps	Goals	Apps	Goals
Linense	2019	Paulista A2	—		—		—		—		16 (Note: Appearance(s) in Copa Paulista)	0	16	0
Valmiera	2023	Latvian Higher League	28	5	—		2	0	6 (Note: Two appearances in UEFA Champions League, four appearances and one goal in UEFA Conference League)	1	—		36	6
Valmiera	2024	Latvian Higher League	25	1	—		1	0	—		—		26	1
Valmiera	Total		53	6	—		3	0	6	1	—		62	7
Valmiera II	2023	Latvian First League	3	0	—		—		—		—		3	0
Ituano	2025	Série C	5	0	4	0	—		—		—		9	0
Serra Branca	2026	Série D	—		11	2	1	0	—		—		12	2
Botafogo-PB	2026	Série C	19	1	—		—		—		2 (Note: Appearance(s) in Copa do Nordeste)	0	21	1
Career total			80	7	15	2	4	0	6	1	18	0	123	10
