= Kristaps Zommers =

Latvian footballer (born 1997)

Personal information
- Date of birth: 7 January 1997 (age 29)
- Place of birth: Riga, Latvia
- Height: 1.88 m (6 ft 2 in)
- Position: Goalkeeper

Team information
- Current team: Riga FC
- Number: 12

Youth career
- –2014: Daugava Rīga
- 2014–2015: AGF

Senior career*
Years	Team	Apps	(Gls)
2015–2019	Parma	54	(0)
2017–2018	→ Pordenone (loan)	0	(0)
2018	→ Cosenza (loan)	0	(0)
2018–2019	→ Imolese (loan)	5	(0)
2019	Liepāja	6	(0)
2020	Nara	0	(0)
2020–2021	Valmieras	1	(0)
2022	Super Nova	34	(0)
2023–	Riga FC	7	(0)
2023–	Riga FC II	31	(0)

International career
2014	Latvia U17	10	(0)
2014–2015	Latvia U18	4	(0)
2015–2016	Latvia U19	4	(0)
2016–2018	Latvia U21	12	(0)
- * Club domestic league appearances and goals as of 14 June 2026

Kristaps Zommers (born 7 January 1997) is a Latvian professional footballer who plays as a goalkeeper for Riga FC.

== Club career ==
As a youth player, Zommers joined the youth academy of Aarhus Gymnastikforening in Denmark.

He started his career with Parma.

In the 2015-16 Serie D, Kristaps made 25 appearances and kept 17 clean sheets.

Local journalists were deterred by the fact that he cannot speak Italian fluently so his interviews were conducted in English.

In an interview with the Italian show Sports Bar, he said, "In football, you know, things may not always go smoothly; it only affects work and will continue to give my best in training. I am convinced, that our quality, in the long run, will come out." On 17 January 2019, he was released from his Parma contract by mutual consent.

In 2020, he signed for Nara.

Zommers returned to Latvia and signed with Valmieras FK on 10 September 2020.

In 2022, he signed for Super Nova.

On 30 January 2023, Zommers signed for Riga FC.

== International ==
Zommers made his Latvia U-21 debut versus Estonia in the Baltic Cup and is deemed the highest prospect in Latvian goalkeeping.
