= Djibril Guèye =

Senegalese footballer (born 1996)

Personal information
- Date of birth: 19 November 1996 (age 29)
- Place of birth: Ngor, Senegal
- Height: 1.87 m (6 ft 2 in)
- Position: Forward

Team information
- Current team: Liepāja
- Number: 14

Senior career*
Years	Team	Apps	(Gls)
2015–2018	US Ouakam		
2018–2020	AS Douanes		
2020–2024	Valmiera	105	(34)
2025–	Liepāja	49	(24)

International career^{‡}
2019–	Senegal	2	(0)
- * Club domestic league appearances and goals as of 14 June 2026 ‡ National team caps and goals as of 1 September 2019

Djibril Guèye (born 19 November 1996) is a Senegalese football striker who plays for Latvian club Liepāja.

== Club career ==
On 19 December 2024, Guèye signed with Liepāja.
