= Krišs Kārkliņš =

Latvian footballer

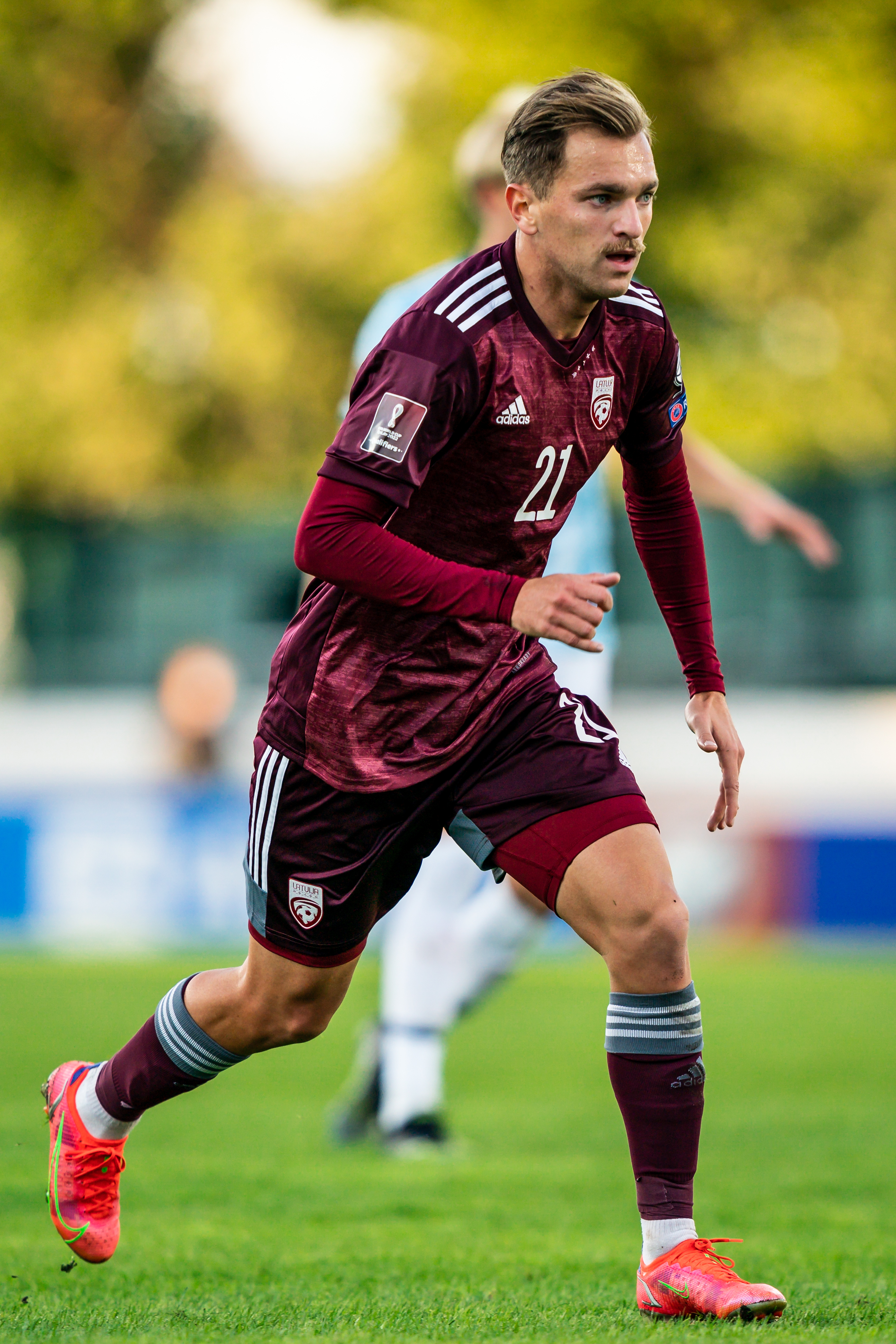

Personal information
- Full name: Krišs Kārkliņš
- Date of birth: 31 January 1996 (age 30)
- Place of birth: Riga, Latvia
- Height: 1.77 m (5 ft 10 in)
- Positions: Defender; midfielder

Team information
- Current team: FK Auda

Youth career
- –2013: Liepājas Metalurgs

Senior career*
Years	Team	Apps	(Gls)
2013–2014	Liepājas Metalurgs	0	(0)
2014–2017	FK Liepāja	64	(2)
2018	Riga	20	(1)
2019–2020	Valmiera	43	(3)
2021-2022	Liepāja		

International career^{‡}
2012	Latvia U17	3	(0)
2014	Latvia U19	9	(1)
2016–2018	Latvia U21	17	(1)
2020–	Latvia	17	(0)
- * Club domestic league appearances and goals as of 21:05, 24 July 2023 (UTC) ‡ National team caps and goals as of 18:20, 24 July 2023 (UTC).

Krišs Kārkliņš (born 31 January 1996) is a Latvian footballer who plays as a defender or midfielder for Valmiera and the Latvia national team.

== Career ==
Kārkliņš made his international debut for Latvia on 6 September 2020 in the UEFA Nations League against Malta, which finished as a 1–1 draw.

== Career statistics ==
=== International ===
As of 6 September 2020

Latvia
Year	Apps	Goals
2020	17	0
Total	17	0
