= Jérémie Porsan-Clémenté =

French footballer (born 1997)

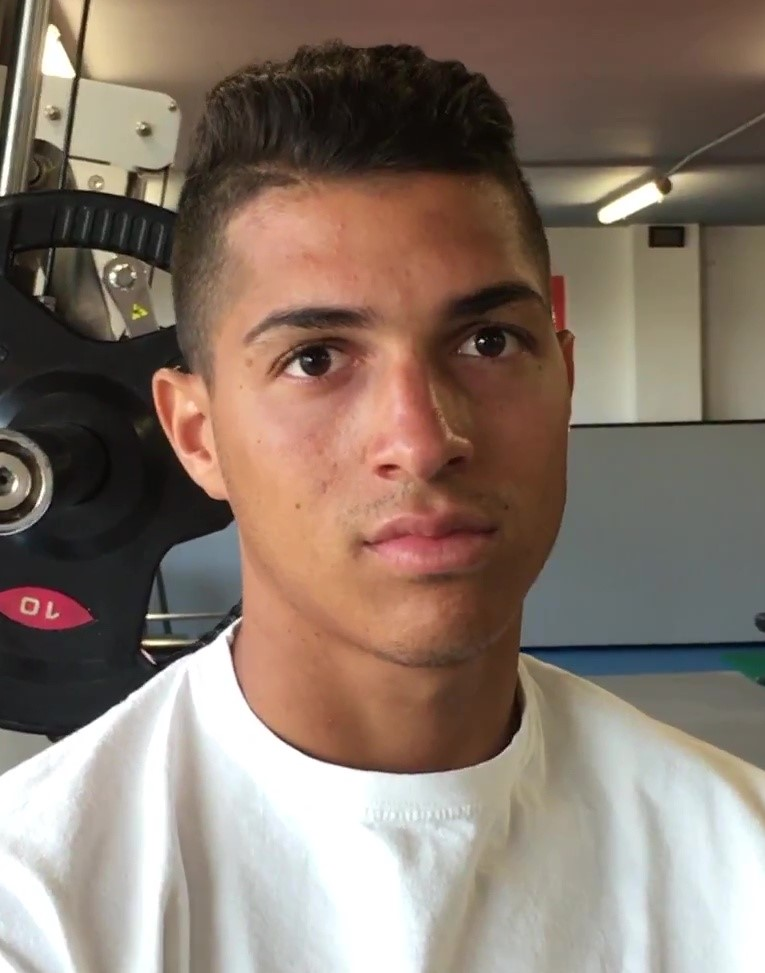
- Porsan-Clémenté in 2018

Personal information
- Date of birth: 16 December 1997 (age 28)
- Place of birth: Schœlcher, Martinique, France
- Height: 1.78 m (5 ft 10 in)
- Position: Forward

Team information
- Current team: Aubagne Air Bel

Youth career
- 2003–2008: FC Schœlcher
- 2008–2011: GS Fort-de-France
- 2011–2014: Marseille

Senior career*
| Years | Team | Apps | (Gls) |
| 2014–2017 | Marseille B | 51 | (12) |
| 2014–2017 | Marseille | 2 | (0) |
| 2017–2019 | Montpellier B | 38 | (10) |
| 2017–2019 | Montpellier | 1 | (0) |
| 2019–2021 | Saint-Étienne B | 14 | (1) |
| 2023–2025 | Valmiera | 38 | (8) |
| 2025–2026 | RFS | 21 | (4) |
| 2026– | Aubagne Air Bel | 0 | (0) |

International career^{‡}
| 2018 | France U20 | 1 | (0) |
| 2024– | Martinique | 4 | (0) |
- * Club domestic league appearances and goals as of 7 November 2025 ‡ National team caps and goals as of 25 March 2025

Jérémie Porsan-Clémenté (born 16 December 1997) is a French professional footballer who plays as a forward for Ligue 3 club Aubagne Air Bel. He represents Martinique internationally.

== Club career ==
Born in Schœlcher, Martinique, Porsan-Clémenté was a youth prospect at Marseille. He made his league debut in a 2–0 home loss against Montpellier on 17 August 2014, replacing Florian Thauvin for the final 15 minutes. At the time, he was the youngest player to play a competitive match for Marseille (16 years and 8 months), but his teammate Bilal Boutobba again broke the record in December of that year.

In June 2017, Porsan-Clémenté joined Ligue 1 side Montpellier. Mainly a reserve in his first season, he made his debut for the club on 19 May 2018 in the last game of the following season, playing 90 minutes in a 1–1 draw away to Rennes. From 2019 to 2021, Porsan-Clémenté played for the reserve side of Saint-Étienne. In 2023, he signed for Latvian club Valmiera.

== International career ==
In 2018, Porsan-Clémenté was called up to the France U20 national team for the Toulon Tournament. He made his first and only appearance for the team as a starter in a 4–1 win over South Korea on 27 May 2018. However, he suffered an injury that kept him out for the remainder of the competition.

On 11 October 2024, he made his debut for the Martinique national football team.
