= Renārs Varslavāns =

Latvian footballer (born 2001)

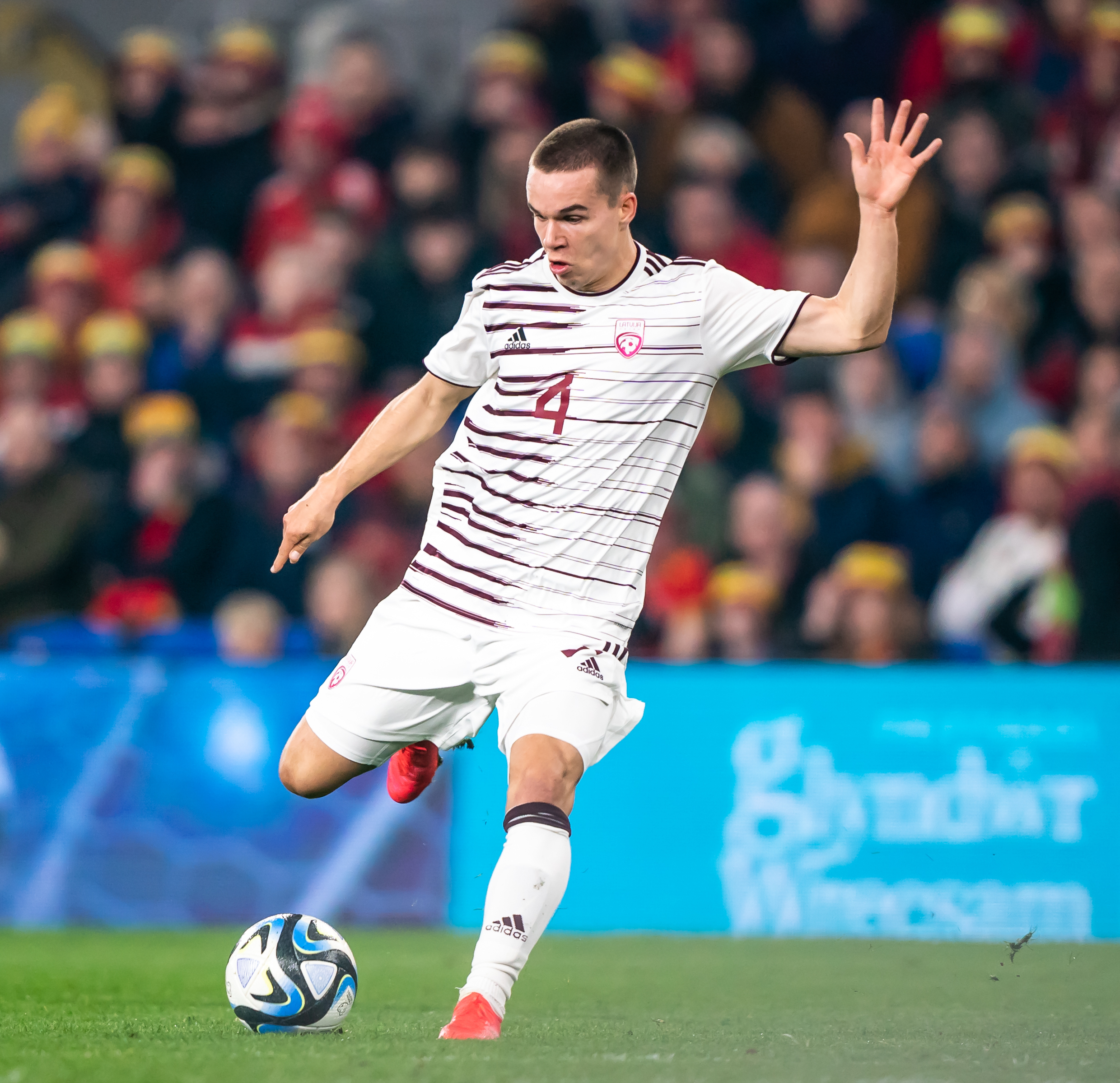

Personal information
- Date of birth: 23 August 2001 (age 25)
- Place of birth: Riga, Latvia
- Height: 1.74 m (5 ft 9 in)
- Positions: Winger; forward

Team information
- Current team: Riga FC
- Number: 14

Youth career
- 2009–2013: JFC Skonto
- 2014–2017: Metta

Senior career*
Years	Team	Apps	(Gls)
2017–2019	Metta	32	(1)
2020–2022	RFS	47	(4)
2023–2024	Valmiera	35	(4)
2025	FK Auda	23	(4)
2025—	Riga FC	17	(3)

International career^{‡}
2017	Latvia U17	3	(11)
2018–2019	Latvia U19	6	(0)
2020	Latvia U21	3	(0)
2021–	Latvia	16	(1)
- * Club domestic league appearances and goals as of 14 June 2026 ‡ National team caps and goals as of 1 July 2025

Renārs Varslavāns (born 23 August 2001) is a Latvian professional footballer who plays as a winger for Virslīga club Valmiera and the Latvian national team.

== Career ==
On 16 August 2025, Varslavāns signed with Riga FC.

== International career ==
Varslavāns made his international debut for Latvia on 7 June 2021 in a friendly match against Germany. On 10 September 2024, he scored his first international goal in a 1–0 win over the Faroe Islands in the 2024–25 UEFA Nations League C.

== Career statistics ==
=== International ===
List of international goals scored by Renārs Varslavāns
No.	Date	Venue	Opponent	Score	Result	Competition
1	10 September 2024	Skonto Stadium, Riga, Latvia	Faroe Islands	1–0	1–0	2024–25 UEFA Nations League C

== Links ==
Renārs Varslavāns at Soccerway.com

- Renārs Varslavāns at WorldFootball.net
- Renārs Varslavāns at Soccerbase.com
- Renārs Varslavāns at National-Football-Teams.com
- Renārs Varslavāns at Kicker (in German)
- Renārs Varslavāns at EU-Football.info
