= Noah Toribio =

American soccer player (born 1999)

Personal information
- Full name: Noah Luke Toribio
- Date of birth: March 14, 1999 (age 27)
- Place of birth: London, England
- Position: Defender

Youth career
- 2015–2018: Banfield
- Boca

Senior career*
Years	Team	Apps	(Gls)
2020–2021	Vélez	7	(0)
2021–2022	Ierapetra	22	(1)
2022–2023	Liepāja	7	(0)

International career^{‡}
2016	United States U18	1	(0)
- * Club domestic league appearances and goals as of 10:37, 13 April 2023 (UTC) ‡ National team caps and goals as of November 13, 2016

Noah Luke Toribio (born March 14, 1999) is a professional soccer player who plays as a defender. Born in England, he has represented the United States at youth level.

== Career ==
=== Club career ===
In 2015, Toribio joined the youth academy of Argentine side Banfield. In 2020, he signed for Vélez in the Spanish fourth division after trialing for American top flight club Minnesota United, Larne in Northern Ireland, English third division team Fleetwood Town, and FC Utrecht in the Dutch top flight. In his only year with Vélez, he helped them earn promotion to the Spanish third division. In 2021, he signed for Greek second division outfit Ierapetra. On November 20, Toribio debuted for OFI during a 2–0 loss to Egaleo.

== International career ==
In 2016, Toribio represented the United States under-18 team in a friendly against the South Florida Surf of the Premier Development League. He also remains eligible to represent England, Italy, or Argentina in addition to the United States.
