= Rihards Matrevics =

Latvian footballer (born 1999)

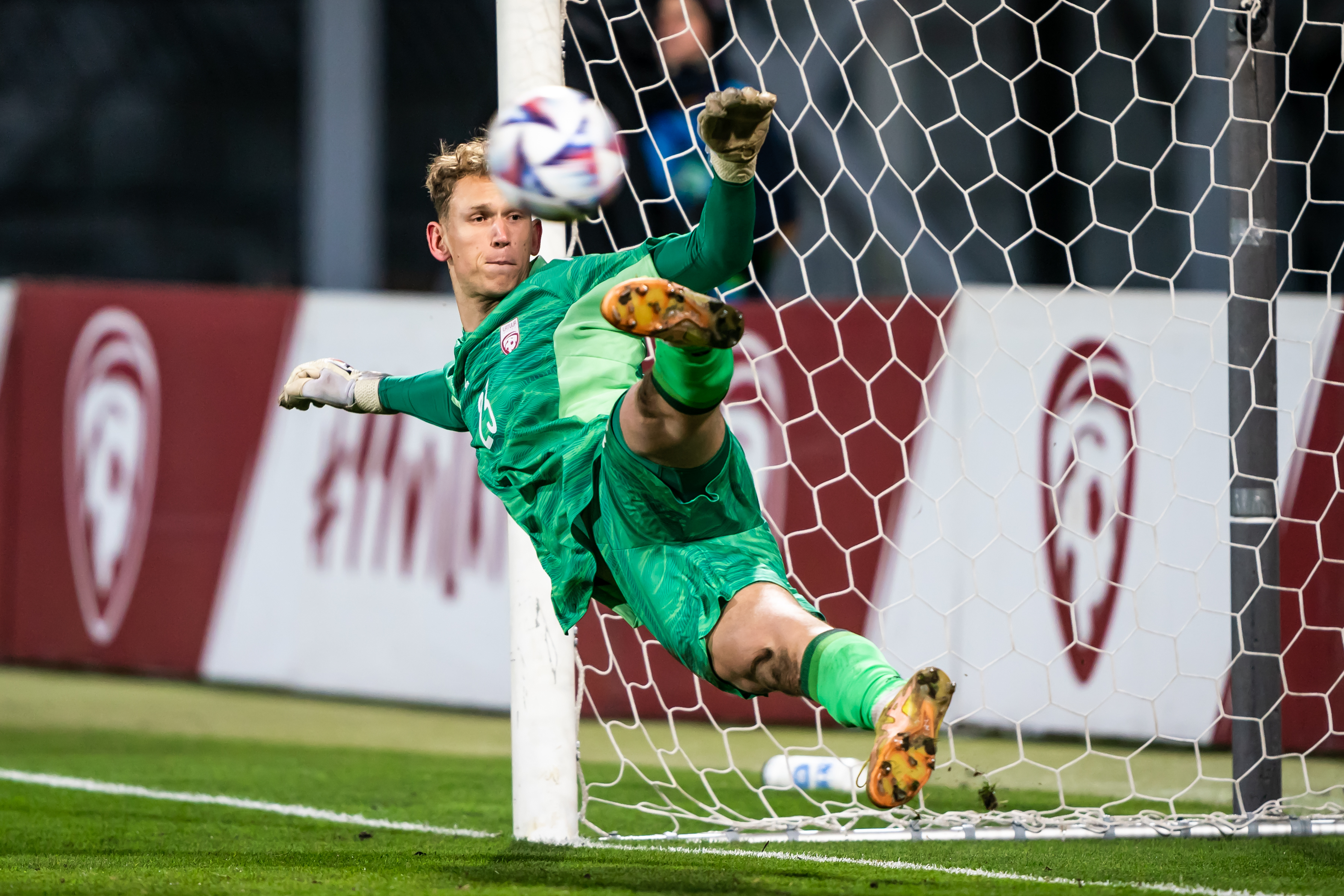

Personal information
- Date of birth: 18 March 1999 (age 27)
- Place of birth: Latvia
- Height: 2.01 m (6 ft 7 in)
- Position: Goalkeeper

Team information
- Current team: RFS
- Number: 1

Youth career
- 2006–2015: SK Babīte
- 2015–2018: West Ham United

Senior career*
Years	Team	Apps	(Gls)
2018–2020	Barnet	1	(0)
2019–2020	→ Hendon (loan)	12	(0)
2020	Hendon	2	(0)
2020	St Albans City	1	(0)
2021–2022	Valmiera	58	(0)
2023–2024	Riga FC	17	(0)
2025	Auda	13	(0)
2025–2026	Dukla Prague	18	(0)
2026–	RFS	8	(0)

International career^{‡}
2015	Latvia U16	3	(0)
2015	Latvia U17	7	(0)
2016–2018	Latvia U19	19	(0)
2019	Latvia U21	4	(0)
2022–	Latvia	23	(0)
- * Club domestic league appearances and goals as of 12 November 2026 ‡ National team caps and goals as of 18 November 2026

Rihards Matrevics (born 18 March 1999) is a Latvian professional footballer who plays as a goalkeeper for Latvian Higher League club RFS and the Latvia national team.

== Club career ==
In 2015, Matrevics joined the youth academy of English Premier League side West Ham United from Latvian club SK Babīte, where he spent nine years. On 1 August 2018, Matrevics signed for National League club Barnet, following a successful trial period at the club. On 19 January 2019, Matrevics made his debut for Barnet, coming on as a fifth minute substitute for the Bees, following Mark Cousins' red card in a 4–0 loss against Braintree Town. In November 2019, Matrevics signed for Hendon on loan, making 14 appearances in all competitions for the club. The following season, Matrevics returned to Hendon on a permanent basis. During his second spell, Matrevics made three appearances in all competitions. In October 2020, Matrevics signed for St Albans City as back-up for Michael Johnson. Matrevics made two appearances, debuting in the FA Cup against Bishop's Stortford before keeping a clean sheet against Chippenham Town in a 3–0 league win on 31 October 2020, during his time at St Albans.

Ahead of the 2021 Latvian Higher League season, Matrevics returned to his native Latvia, signing for Valmiera. On 4 April 2021, Matrevics made his debut for the club, keeping a clean sheet in a 1–0 win against Ventspils. During the 2021 season, Matrevics made 24 league appearances as Valmiera finished second, qualifying for the 2022–23 UEFA Europa Conference League.

On 8 December 2022, Matrevics signed for Riga FC. Matrevics played 13 times in the 2025 Latvian Higher League for FK Auda, keeping 7 clean sheets, before signing for Czech First League side FK Dukla Prague in June 2025. He kept four clean sheets for Dukla in 18 league appearances during the 2025–26 Czech First League.

On 12 June 2026, Matrevics returned to Latvia, signing a contract with FK RFS.

== International career ==
Matrevics has represented Latvia at under-16, under-17, under-19 and under-21 level. On 29 March 2022, Matrevics made his debut for Latvia, playing the second half in a 1–0 friendly win against Azerbaijan.
