= Pablinho =

Brazilian footballer

Personal information
- Full name: Pablo Henrique Almeida Silva
- Date of birth: 20 September 2003 (age 23)
- Place of birth: Ipatinga, Brazil
- Height: 1.72 m (5 ft 8 in)
- Position: Forward

Team information
- Current team: FK Auda (on loan from Cuiabá)
- Number: 82

Youth career
- América Mineiro
- 2023: Cuiabá

Senior career*
Years	Team	Apps	(Gls)
2022–2023	Novo Esporte	10	(4)
2023	→ Democrata-GV (loan)	6	(1)
2023–	Cuiabá	2	(0)
2024–	→ FK Auda (loan)	4	(0)
- * Club domestic league appearances and goals as of 8 May 2024

Pablo Henrique Almeida Silva (born 20 September 2003), commonly known as Pablinho, is a Brazilian footballer who plays as a forward for Latvian club FK Auda, on loan from Cuiabá.

== Club career ==
Born in Ipatinga but raised in Coronel Fabriciano, both in the state of Minas Gerais, Pablinho began his career with Novo Esporte in the 2022 Campeonato Mineiro Segunda Divisão, after being picked up in a trial at his hometown. In December 2022, he was included in Democrata-GV's squad for the upcoming season.

In March 2023, Pablinho moved to Cuiabá and was initially assigned to the under-20 team. He made his first team – and Série A – debut with the club on 24 September, coming on as a second-half substitute for Clayson in a 1–0 away loss to Atlético Mineiro.

== Career statistics ==
As of 27 September 2023

Club	Season	League			State League		Cup		Continental		Other		Total	
Club	Season	Division	Apps	Goals	Apps	Goals	Apps	Goals	Apps	Goals	Apps	Goals	Apps	Goals
Novo Esporte	2022	Mineiro Segunda Divisão	—		10	4	—		—		—		10	4
Democrata-GV (loan)	2023	Série D	0	0	6	1	1	0	—		1 (Note: Appearance(s) in Recopa Mineira)	0	8	1
Cuiabá	2023	Série A	1	0	—		—		—		3 (Note: Appearance(s) in Copa FMF)	2	4	2
Career total			1	0	16	5	1	0	0	0	4	2	22	7
