= Carlos Olses =

Venezuelan footballer (born 2000)

Personal information
- Full name: Carlos Raúl Olses Quijada
- Date of birth: 5 September 2000 (age 26)
- Place of birth: Caracas, Venezuela
- Height: 1.93 m (6 ft 4 in)
- Position: Goalkeeper

Team information
- Current team: FK Žalgiris
- Number: 1

Youth career
- Fratelsa FC

Senior career*
Years	Team	Apps	(Gls)
2017–2023	Deportivo La Guaira	70	(0)
2019–2020	→ Racing Club (loan)	0	(0)
2023–2024	Valmiera	35	(0)
2025–	Žalgiris	30	(0)

International career
2017	Venezuela U17	9	(0)
2019–	Venezuela U20	10	(0)
- * Club domestic league appearances and goals as of 12 March 2026

Carlos Raúl Olses Quijada (born 5 September 2000) is a Venezuelan professional footballer who plays as a goalkeeper for A Lyga side FK Žalgiris.

== Club career ==
On January 28, 2018, Carlos debuted for Deportivo La Guaira in the Venezuelan Primera División. On 1 February 2019, Olses joined Argentine club Racing Club on a 18-months loan deal for a fee of 150.000 dollars with an option to make the move permanent for 650.000 dollars for 80% of the players rights.

=== FK Žalgiris ===
On 18 February 2025 Olses signed with Lithuanian Žalgiris Club.

On 3 May 2025 Carlos Olses made his debut in A Lyga against Banga Club. On 31st minute scored Vaidas Magdušauskas and on 87 minute scored Nouri El Harmazi. Banga won against FK Žalgiris 2–0.

== International career ==
Olses, at first was called up to the Venezuela under-15 side for the 2015 South American Under-15 Football Championship, he started all the games Venezuela played in the tournament.

After that he was called up to the Venezuela under-17 side for the 2017 South American Under-17 Football Championship, and also starred all the games Venezuela played in the tournament.

Between August and September 2017, he was called up to play with the Venezuelan national selection "La Vinotinto" being named as the youngest player to be selected by this professional category in the Venezuelan Football Federation (FVF).

During the month of November 2017 he was called up to play in the 2017 "Juegos Bolivarianos" Under-20 Football Championship.

== Career statistics ==
=== Club ===
As of 30 August 2017

Club performance		League		Cup		Continental		Total	
Club	Season	Apps	Goals	Apps	Goals	Apps	Goals	Apps	Goals
Deportivo La Guaira									
Deportivo La Guaira	2017	0	0	0	0	0	0	0	0
Total		0	0	0	0	0	0	0	0
Career total		0	0	0	0	0	0	0	0

== Personal life ==
Carlos' parents are called Alejandro and Irene. He has two siblings; a brother and a half-sister.
