= Brice Tutu =

French footballer (born 1998)

Personal information
- Date of birth: 11 January 1998 (age 28)
- Place of birth: Clichy, Hauts-de-Seine, France
- Height: 1.95 m (6 ft 5 in)
- Position: Forward

Team information
- Current team: Chatou

Youth career
- 2008–2016: Clichy
- 2016–2017: Caen

Senior career*
| Years | Team | Apps | (Gls) |
| 2017–2020 | Caen II | 44 | (10) |
| 2019–2021 | Caen | 3 | (0) |
| 2019–2020 | → Bastia (loan) | 10 | (1) |
| 2020–2021 | → Beauvais (loan) | 2 | (1) |
| 2021 | Jeunesse Esch | 5 | (0) |
| 2022 | Auda | 16 | (5) |
| 2022 | Riga | 2 | (0) |
| 2023 | Bylis | 5 | (0) |
| 2023–2024 | Villacidrese | | |
| 2024– | Chatou | 1 | (0) |
- * Club domestic league appearances and goals as of 5 October 2024

Brice Tutu (born 11 January 1998) is a French professional footballer who plays as a forward for Championnat National 3 club Chatou.

== Professional career ==
On 15 February 2019, Tutu signed his first professional contract with Caen for three years. He made his professional debut with Caen in a 0–0 Ligue 2 tie with Sochaux on 26 July 2019.
