= Lūkass Vapne =

Latvian footballer (born 2003)

Personal information
- Date of birth: 31 August 2003 (age 23)
- Place of birth: Riga, Latvia
- Height: 1.85 m (6 ft 1 in)
- Position: Central midfielder

Team information
- Current team: Sogndal
- Number: 16

Youth career
- Metta

Senior career*
Years	Team	Apps	(Gls)
2020–2025	Metta	96	(15)
2022	→ Valmiera (loan)	10	(3)
2022	→ Valmiera II (loan)	1	(0)
2024	→ Valmiera (loan)	35	(10)
2025	→ Sogndal (loan)	13	(2)
2025–	Sogndal	47	(5)

International career^{‡}
2019	Latvia U17	8	(1)
2021	Latvia U19	3	(0)
2022–2024	Latvia U21	13	(2)
2024–	Latvia	26	(0)
- * Club domestic league appearances and goals as of 14 November 2026 ‡ National team caps and goals as of 15 November 2026

Lūkass Vapne (born 31 August 2003) is a Latvian football player who plays as a central midfielder for Sogndal and the Latvia national team.

== International career ==
Vapne made his debut for the Latvia national team on 8 June 2024 in a 0–2 Baltic Cup loss against Lithuania at the Daugava Stadium. He played the full game.
