= Jonah Attuquaye =

Ghanaian footballer

Personal information
- Date of birth: 15 June 2000 (age 26)
- Position: Right winger

Team information
- Current team: FK Auda
- Number: 20

Senior career*
Years	Team	Apps	(Gls)
2019–2020	Berekum Chelsea	25	(1)
2020–2022	Legon Cities	60	(11)
2023–	FK Auda	27	(1)

International career^{‡}
2022–	Ghana	6	(0)
- * Club domestic league appearances and goals as of 11 November 2024 ‡ National team caps and goals as of 13 March 2023

Jonah Attuquaye is a Ghanaian professional footballer who plays as midfielder for Latvian Higher League side FK Auda.

== Career ==
Attuquaye played for Berekum Chelsea from 2019 to 2020. He later moved to Legon Cities in 2020 in the club's bid to bolster their squad ahead of the 2020–21 Ghana Premier League season.

Attuquaye made his international debut for Ghana in July 2022 during the 2022 African Nations Championship qualification, and played the 2022 African Nations Championship. Ahead of the 2023 season he moved to Europe, and Latvian Higher League side FK Auda.
