= Kemehlo Nguena =

French footballer (born 2000)

Personal information
- Full name: Kemehlo Pierre Kevin Nguena
- Date of birth: 10 July 2000 (age 26)
- Place of birth: Poitiers, France
- Height: 1.83 m (6 ft 0 in)
- Position: Midfielder

Team information
- Current team: Drita
- Number: 93

Senior career*
Years	Team	Apps	(Gls)
2019–2020	Troyes II	19	(0)
2020	Troyes	2	(0)
2021–2023	Slavia Sofia	33	(4)
2023–2024	Riga	56	(14)
2025	Auda	31	(10)
2026–	Drita	22	(2)
- * Club domestic league appearances and goals as of 1 November 2026

Kemehlo Nguena (born 10 July 2000) is a French professional footballer who plays as a midfielder for Football Superleague of Kosovo club Drita.

== Professional career ==
Nguena made his professional debut with Troyes in a 1–0 Ligue 2 win over Rodez on 17 October 2020.

On 27 August 2021 he signed a 1.5-year contract with Bulgarian club Slavia Sofia.

In February 2023, Nguena joined Latvian Higher League club Riga.

On the 2nd of February 2026, Nguena joined Kosovo Superleaugue club Drita. Nguena joined the club mid-season, which ended up being triumphant for the Kosovar side. Nguena made 12 appearances and registered a single assist. Drita were crowned champions of the 25–26 season.
