= Jānis Beks =

Latvian footballer (born 2002)

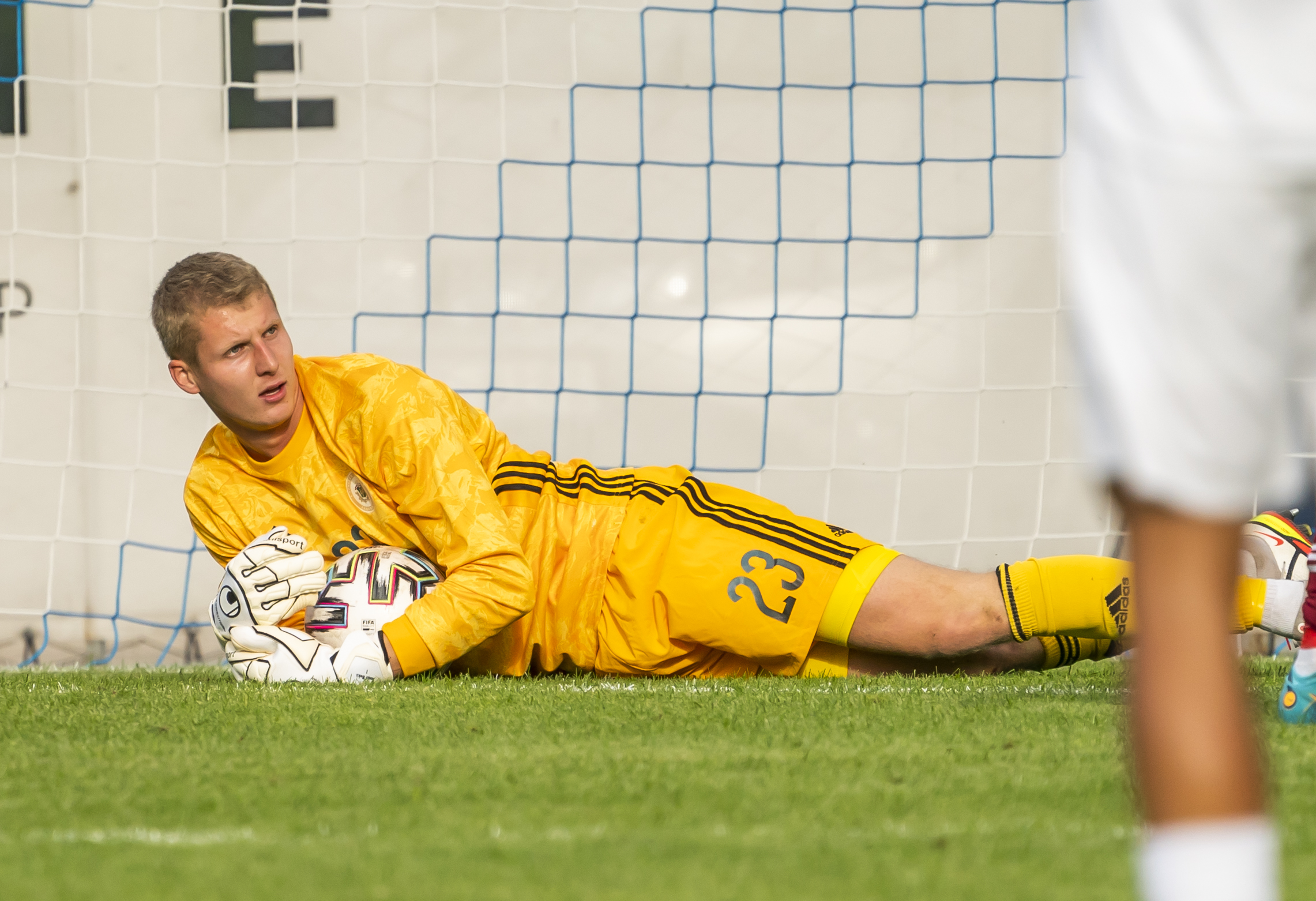

Personal information
- Full name: Jānis Beks
- Date of birth: 1 November 2002 (age 24)
- Place of birth: Rīga, Latvia
- Height: 1.88 m (6 ft 2 in)
- Position: Goalkeeper

Team information
- Current team: BFC Daugavpils (on loan from FK RFS)
- Number: 12

Youth career
- -2020: FS Metta

Senior career*
Years	Team	Apps	(Gls)
2020-2022	FK Metta	56	(0)
2020-2022	FK RFS	0	(0)
2023	→ FK Metta	28	(0)
2024-	FK RFS	0	(0)
2024-	RFS II	8	(0)
2024	→ Tukums 2000 (loan)	13	(0)
2025-	→ BFC Daugavpils (loan)	65	(0)

International career^{‡}
2019	Latvia U-18	2	(0)
2022-2023	Latvia U-21	6	(0)
2023–	Latvia	0	(0)
- * Club domestic league appearances and goals as of 12 November 2026 ‡ National team caps and goals as of 10:00, 24 July 2023 (UTC)

Jānis Beks (born 1 November 2002) is a Latvian footballer who plays as a goalkeeper for BFC Daugavpils, on loan from FK RFS and the Latvia national team.

== Career ==
Beks has been called up for Latvia national team for the UEFA Euro 2024 qualifying matches against Turkey national team on 16 June 2023 and Armenia national team on 19 June 2023.

== Career statistics ==
=== International ===
As of 24 July 2023

Latvia
Year	Apps	Goals
2023	0	0
Total	0	0
