= Vjačeslavs Isajevs =

Latvian footballer (born 1993)

Personal information
- Date of birth: 27 August 1993 (age 33)
- Place of birth: Riga, Latvia
- Height: 1.87 m (6 ft 2 in)
- Position: Defender

Team information
- Current team: Liepāja
- Number: 26

Senior career*
Years	Team	Apps	(Gls)
2010–2011	JFK Olimps	30	(0)
2012–2015	Skonto	52	(1)
2016–2020	RFS	93	(2)
2021–2022	Liepāja	36	(1)
2022–2024	Auda	66	(2)
2025–	Liepāja	27	(1)

International career^{‡}
2011	Latvia U19	1	(0)
2012–2013	Latvia U21	15	(0)
2018	Latvia	7	(0)
- * Club domestic league appearances and goals as of 12 November 2026 ‡ National team caps and goals as of 13 March 2023

Vjačeslavs Isajevs (born 27 August 1993) is a Latvian footballer who plays as a defender for Liepāja. He was capped once for the Latvia national team.

== Club career ==
On 8 January 2025, Isajevs returned to Liepāja.

== International career ==
Isajevs made his international debut for Latvia on 9 September 2018, starting in the 2018–19 UEFA Nations League D match against Georgia, which finished as a 0–1 away loss.
