= Valmiera FC =

Association football club in Latvia

Valmiera
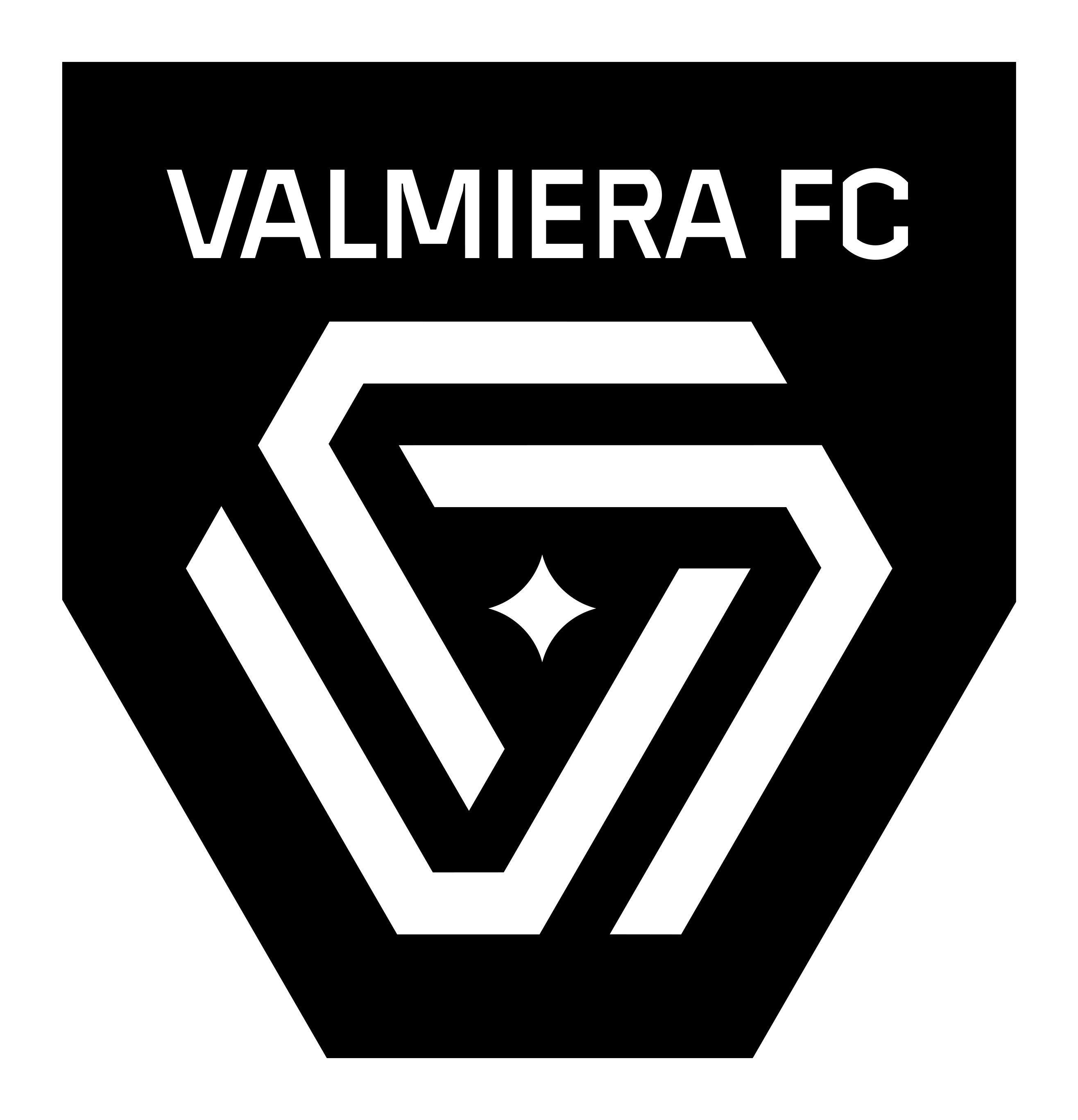
- Full name: Valmiera Football Club
- Founded: 1996; 30 years ago
- Ground: Jānis Daliņš Stadium, Valmiera, Latvia
- Capacity: 1,000
- Chairman: Uldis Pūcītis
- Manager: Gatis Kalniņš
- League: LVBET līga
- 2025: Altero.lv LIIGA, 1st (Promoted)
- Website: www.valmierafc.com
Home colours	Away colours

Valmiera Football Club is a Latvian professional football club playing in the LVBET līga, the second highest division in the Latvian football league system. The club is based in the city of Valmiera. By winning the Latvian First League in 2017, the team was promoted to the 2018 Virslīga after a 14-year absence, and won their first title in 2022.

== History ==
A predecessor of the club and the main team of the city of Valmiera from 1978 to 1993 was FK Gauja Valmiera, which won the final Football Championship of the Latvian SSR in 1990 and continued in the top flight after the restoration of the independence of Latvia. However, after the 1993 Virslīga season Gauja was relegated and slowly declined, disbanding in the mid-1990s while playing in the 2. līga.

The current club was founded in 1996 as Valmieras FK (Valmieras futbola klubs). It participated in the 1. līga (the second-highest division of Latvian football). The team finished second in the league which gave Valmiera the possibility to battle with the second from bottom team of the Higher League – Skonto-Metāls for a place in the top division of Latvian football. In the first game in Riga Skonto-Metāls won 1:0, but at home Valmiera overcame the one goal deficit and won 2:0 (I. Maļukovs, Dz. Savaļnieks), thus earning a place in the Virslīga.

In its debut season in the Virslīga Valmiera managed to finish 7th out of 9 teams with a comfortable margin over the two weakest teams. The following season was even more successful as the team finished 5th in Virslīga, and the same result was repeated in 1999. The new millennium brought financial difficulties for FK Valmiera. After the 2003 season the team had to leave the Virslīga because of financial difficulties and since then played in the 1. līga, paying more attention to developing young talent.

Several of former Valmiera players have played in the Latvia national football team. Those include Vīts Rimkus, Viktors Morozs, Gatis Kalniņš, Deniss Romanovs and Māris Smirnovs.

For more than ten years Valmiera was a mid level team in the 1. līga. Since 2010, under manager Gatis Ērglis a number of young local players experienced rapid development and the team became one of the leaders of the 1. līga. In 2016 the sports organisation was established as "SO Valmiera Glass / Vidzemes Augstskola" or "Valmiera Glass ViA" - taking the name of the team's long-time sponsor Valmiera Fiberglass and Vidzeme University, which inherited the legacy of Valmiera football. Also joining Valmiera Glass ViA was the school's basketball club. In 2017 the team's best scorers were Alvis Dubovs and Niks Savaļnieks, helping Valmiera Glass ViA to win the Latvian First League with a ten-point margin.

In 2018, Valmiera Glass ViA returned to the Virslīga. One of the biggest offseason deals for the team was the return of Gatis Kalniņš to his hometown, but the veteran striker was mostly sidelined due to injuries. The team struggled in amidst fierce competition and earned only one point in the first ten rounds of the league. That led to the decision to replace long time manager Ērglis with Ukrainian coach Mykola Trubachov. In 2019, he was replaced by Georgian coach Tamaz Pertia.

In 2020 club was renamed to "Valmiera FC" (Valmiera Football Club), reportedly due to Valmiera Fibreglass entering a temporary legal protection process due to financial difficulties.

In 2022, Valmiera won the Latvian top-tier league for the first time in history under the management of coach Jurģis Kalns. This was followed by two consecutive 4th place finishes. However, around 2024 the team started to accumulate unpaid debts, which led to the club being denied a license to play in the 2025 Virslīga season and being banned from the first tier, resulting in immediate disqualification from the 2024 campaign. FS Jelgava, who finished 10th and would have been otherwise relegated, then got the all-clear to take Valmiera's place. Later, Valmiera was denied a Latvian First League license as well, making the future of the team unclear. Ultimately, the club managed to reduce its debt and was granted a license to play in the third-level Altero.lv LIIGA in the 2025 season.

== Honours ==
- Latvian Higher League
  - Champions (1): 2022

== League and Cup history ==
FK Valmiera / Valmiera Glass ViA / Valmiera FC

Season	Division (Name)	Pos./Teams	Latvian Football Cup
1996	2nd (1.līga)	2/(13)	1/16 finals
1997	1st (Virslīga)	7/(9)	1/8 finals
1998	1st (Virslīga)	5/(8)	1/2 finals
1999	1st (Virslīga)	5/(8)	1/4 finals
2000	1st (Virslīga)	6/(8)	1/4 finals
2001	1st (Virslīga)	6/(8)	1/4 finals
2002	1st (Virslīga)	5/(8)	1/4 finals
2003	1st (Virslīga)	6/(8)	1/8 finals
2004	2nd (1.līga)	7/(14)	1/16 finals
2005	2nd (1.līga)	6/(14)	1/8 finals
2006	2nd (1.līga)	7/(16)	1/8 finals
2007	2nd (1.līga)	10/(16)	3rd round
2008	2nd (1.līga)	7/(15)	Did not participate
2009	2nd (1.līga)	11/(14)	Not held
2010	2nd (1.līga)	6/(12)	Did not participate
2011	2nd (1.līga)	9/(13)	1/4 finals
2012	2nd (1.līga)	8/(14)	1/8 finals
2013	2nd (1.līga)	3/(16)	1/8 finals
2014	2nd (1.līga)	3/(16)	1/8 finals
2015	2nd (1.līga)	2/(16)	1/8 finals
2016	2nd (1.līga)	4/(15)	1/32 finals
2017	2nd (1.līga)	1/(12)	1/8 finals
2018	1st (Virslīga)	8/(8)	1/4 finals
2019	1st (Virslīga)	4/(9)	1/8 finals
2020	1st (Virslīga)	3/(10)	1/2 finals
2021	1st (Virslīga)	2/(8)	1/2 finals
2022	1st (Virslīga)	1/(10)	1/4 finals
2023	1st (Virslīga)	4/(10)	1/4 finals
2024	1st (Virslīga)	4/(10)	1/4 finals
2025	3rd (2.līga)	1/(20)	1/16 finals

== European record ==
As of match played 17 August 2023

Season	Competition	Round	Club	Home	Away	Agg.
2020–21	UEFA Europa League	1QR	(Poland) Lech Poznań	—N/a	0−3	—N/a
2021–22	UEFA Europa Conference League	1QR	(Lithuania) Sūduva	0–0	1−2	1−2
2022–23	UEFA Europa Conference League	2QR	(North Macedonia) Shkëndija	1−2	1−3	2−5
2023–24	UEFA Champions League	1QR	(Slovenia) Olimpija Ljubljana	1−2	1−2	2−4
2023–24	UEFA Europa Conference League	2QR	(San Marino) Tre Penne	7–0	3–0	10–0
2023–24	UEFA Europa Conference League	3QR	(Albania) Partizani	1−2	0−1	1−3

Notes

- QR: Qualifying round

== Players ==
=== Current squad ===
As of 6 April, 2026

Note: Flags indicate national team as defined under FIFA eligibility rules; some limited exceptions apply. Players may hold more than one non-FIFA nationality.

No.	Pos.	Nation	Player
1	GK	LAT	Haralds Kalnins
2	DF	JPN	Toki Yamamura
3	DF	LAT	Ernests Kalnins
4	DF	LAT	Mārcis Ērglis
5	DF	FRA	Lenny Manisa
8	MF	LAT	Vladimirs Stepanovs
10	MF	TUN	Fraj Kayramani
11	FW	BRA	Gleilson Lopes
12	GK	LAT	Ralfs Sakalis
13	DF	LAT	Ņikita Cepeļevs
15	DF	LAT	Rodzers Krasts
17	DF	LAT	Rinalds Freilihs

No.	Pos.	Nation	Player
18	MF	LAT	Jekabs Vagars
19	FW	LAT	Daniils Cepelevs
22	DF	LAT	Matiss Jurka
25	FW	MLI	Mahamadou Dembele
27	MF	LAT	Adrians Bannikovs
28	MF	LAT	Arturs Berzins
29	MF	LAT	Igors Kulitis
33	MF	LAT	Alekss Tkacenko
41	MF	JPN	Wataru Abe
42	MF	LAT	Rojs Buss
-	FW	SEN	Pape Doudou
-	MF	LAT	Ralfs Streiba

=== Out on loan ===
Note: Flags indicate national team as defined under FIFA eligibility rules; some limited exceptions apply. Players may hold more than one non-FIFA nationality.

No. / Pos. / Nation / Player	No. / Pos. / Nation / Player
