= List of Latvian football transfers winter 2018–19 =

This is a list of Latvian football transfers in the 2018–19 winter transfer window by club. Only transfers of the Virslīga are included.

== Latvian Higher League ==
=== Riga FC ===
In: Note: Flags indicate national team as defined under FIFA eligibility rules; some limited exceptions apply. Players may hold more than one non-FIFA nationality.

No.	Pos.	Nation	Player
—	GK	LVA	Maksims Uvarenko (from Ventspils)
—	DF	FRA	Joël Bopesu (from (North Macedonia) Rabotnički)
—	DF	ALB	Herdi Prenga (from (Croatia) Inter Zaprešić)
—	MF	LVA	Aleksejs Višņakovs (from Spartaks)
—	MF	LVA	Ritvars Rugins (from Ventspils)
—	MF	LVA	Ņikita Jankovskis (from RTU FC)
—	MF	JPN	Minori Sato (from (South Korea) Gwangju FC)
—	FW	LVA	Vladislavs Fjodorovs (from METTA/LU)
—	FW	GEO	Davit Skhirtladze (from (Slovakia) Spartak Trnava)
—	FW	LVA	Artūrs Karašausks (on loan from (Cyprus) Pafos)
—	FW	FRA	Kévin Bérigaud (on loan from (Cyprus) Pafos)
—	FW	LVA	Marks Smuļko (from RTU FC)

Out: Note: Flags indicate national team as defined under FIFA eligibility rules; some limited exceptions apply. Players may hold more than one non-FIFA nationality.

No.	Pos.	Nation	Player
1	GK	LVA	Germans Māliņš (to Jelgava)
2	DF	LVA	Vitālijs Smirnovs (to Spartaks)
5	MF	LVA	Krišs Kārkliņš (to Valmiera)
7	MF	LVA	Artūrs Zjuzins (to RFS)
10	MF	LVA	Boriss Bogdaškins (to Valmiera)
11	MF	LVA	Romāns Mickevičs (to Ventspils)
21	MF	SLE	George Davies (loan return to (Austria) St. Pölten)
29	DF	UKR	Volodymyr Bayenko (to (Uzbekistan) Buxoro)
32	FW	LVA	Aleksejs Davidenkovs (to (Italy) Montefiascone)
35	MF	RUS	Ivan Yenin (to (Bosnia and Herzegovina) Široki Brijeg)
92	FW	LVA	Deniss Rakels (loan return to (Cyprus) Pafos)
93	MF	BRA	Thiago Primão (to (Brazil) Paysandu)
97	FW	UKR	Bohdan Kovalenko (on loan to Daugavpils)

=== Ventspils ===
In: Note: Flags indicate national team as defined under FIFA eligibility rules; some limited exceptions apply. Players may hold more than one non-FIFA nationality.

No.	Pos.	Nation	Player
—	GK	LVA	Vjačeslavs Kudrjavcevs (from (Poland) Legia Warsaw)
—	GK	LVA	Frenks Dāvids Orols (from RTU FC)
—	DF	HAI	Jean Sony Alcénat (from (Portugal) Feirense)
—	MF	LVA	Romāns Mickevičs (from Riga FC)
—	MF	LVA	Ingars Stuglis (from Spartaks)
—	MF	LVA	Jevgēņijs Kazačoks (from RFS)
—	MF	RUS	Pavel Osipov (from (Finland) Lahti)
—	FW	LVA	Kaspars Svārups (from Spartaks)
—	FW	BRA	Jô Santos (from (Moldova) Sheriff Tiraspol)

Out: Note: Flags indicate national team as defined under FIFA eligibility rules; some limited exceptions apply. Players may hold more than one non-FIFA nationality.

No.	Pos.	Nation	Player
1	GK	LVA	Maksims Uvarenko (to Riga FC)
2	DF	LVA	Vitālijs Jagodinskis (to RFS)
3	DF	LVA	Vadims Žuļevs (to Liepāja)
5	DF	LVA	Artjoms Solomatovs (to Monarhs Rīga)
6	MF	CPV	Sténio (released)
8	MF	LVA	Ritvars Rugins (to Riga FC)
9	FW	RUS	Vasili Pavlov (to (Ukraine) Chornomorets Odesa)
21	MF	LVA	Vitālijs Rečickis (to Spartaks)
23	MF	UKR	Giuli Mandzhgaladze (to (Georgia (country)) Dinamo Batumi)
28	MF	POR	Pedro Mendes (to (Romania) Gaz Metan Mediaș)
31	DF	LVA	Nauris Bulvītis (to RFS)
38	DF	LVA	Dmitrijs Klimašēvičs (to New Project)
44	MF	UKR	Artem Filimonov (released)
88	GK	LVA	Vitālijs Meļņičenko (to Spartaks)

=== RFS ===
In: Note: Flags indicate national team as defined under FIFA eligibility rules; some limited exceptions apply. Players may hold more than one non-FIFA nationality.

No.	Pos.	Nation	Player
—	DF	LVA	Nauris Bulvītis (from Ventspils)
—	DF	LVA	Vitālijs Jagodinskis (from Ventspils)
—	DF	CIV	Adama Doumbia (free agent)
—	MF	CRO	Slavko Blagojević (from (Lithuania) Žalgiris)
—	MF	LVA	Artūrs Zjuzins (from Riga FC)
—	MF	LVA	Alans Siņeļņikovs (from Jelgava)
—	MF	JPN	Takayuki Seto (from (Japan) Ventforet Kofu)
—	MF	AUT	Tomáš Šimkovič (from (Lithuania) Žalgiris)
—	MF	NGA	Emeka Michael Basil (free agent)
—	MF	NGA	Olabanjo Alexander Ogunji (from (Nigeria) Real Sapphire Academy)
—	MF	GHA	Elisha Obotu Young (free agent)
—	FW	LVA	Artūrs Karašausks (from (Kazakhstan) Akzhayik)
—	FW	SVK	Tomáš Malec (from (Lithuania) Žalgiris)
—	FW	CIV	Cedric Kouadio (from Daugavpils)
—	FW	RUS	Maksim Maksimov (from (North Macedonia) Vardar)
—	FW	BDI	Bonfils Caleb Bimenyimana (from (Rwanda) Rayon Sports)

Out: Note: Flags indicate national team as defined under FIFA eligibility rules; some limited exceptions apply. Players may hold more than one non-FIFA nationality.

No.	Pos.	Nation	Player
3	DF	GEO	Nika Sandokhadze (loan return to (Ukraine) Karpaty Lviv)
4	DF	LVA	Kaspars Dubra (to (Kazakhstan) Irtysh Pavlodar)
5	MF	LVA	Dāvis Indrāns (to Jelgava)
6	DF	LVA	Daniels Balodis (on loan to Daugavpils)
7	FW	GEO	Irakli Sikharulidze (to (Georgia (country)) Locomotive Tbilisi)
13	MF	LVA	Jevgēņijs Kazačoks (to Ventspils)
15	FW	LVA	Eduards Višņakovs (to Tukums 2000)
16	DF	GEO	Lasha Shergelashvili (to (Greece) PAS Giannina)
18	FW	LVA	Marko Regža (to Super Nova)
19	FW	LVA	Artis Jaudzems (to Valmiera)
21	DF	LVA	Iļja Savčenko (to Spartaks)
32	FW	BLR	Dzmitry Platonaw (released)
38	FW	LVA	Maksims Toņiševs (on loan to Daugavpils)
44	DF	SRB	Milan Savić (to (Serbia) Zemun)
45	DF	GHA	Ofosu Appiah (to Liepāja)
80	MF	BRA	Elivelto (to (Kazakhstan) Taraz)
-	MF	LVA	Daniils Ulimbaševs (to Liepāja, previously on loan at Jelgava)
-	FW	LVA	Artūrs Karašausks (to (Cyprus) Pafos)

=== Liepāja ===
In: Note: Flags indicate national team as defined under FIFA eligibility rules; some limited exceptions apply. Players may hold more than one non-FIFA nationality.

No.	Pos.	Nation	Player
—	GK	LVA	Kristaps Zommers (from (Italy) Parma)
—	GK	LVA	Emīls Emulovs (from Jelgava)
—	DF	LVA	Vadims Žuļevs (from Ventspils)
—	DF	GHA	Ofosu Appiah (from RFS)
—	MF	LVA	Daniils Ulimbaševs (from RFS)
—	MF	GHA	Prince Agyemang (from (United States) Richmond Kickers)
—	MF	GEO	Luka Bakuradze (from (Georgia (country)) Saburtalo Tbilisi)
—	MF	BRA	Dodô (from (Brazil) Penapolense)
—	MF	MDA	Dan Spătaru (from (Russia) Nizhny Novgorod)
—	MF	NGA	Richard Emeka Friday (free agent)
—	MF	NGA	Michael Ezekiel Apaki (from (Nigeria) Real Sapphire Academy)
—	FW	GEO	Mate Vatsadze (from (Georgia (country)) Dinamo Tbilisi)
—	MF	SEN	Mame Cheik Niang (free agent)
—	FW	GHA	Samuel Amissah (from (England) Leeds United Reserves)
—	FW	LVA	Vladislavs Kozlovs (from Jelgava)
—	FW	ENG	Moise Kroma (from (England) Leeds United Reserves)
—	FW	ARG	Lucas Delgado (from (Argentina) Club Atlético Temperley)

Out: Note: Flags indicate national team as defined under FIFA eligibility rules; some limited exceptions apply. Players may hold more than one non-FIFA nationality.

No.	Pos.	Nation	Player
2	DF	SEN	Sady Gueye (to (Senegal) Teungueth)
6	DF	SEN	Khassim Soumare (released)
9	MF	LVA	Vladimirs Kamešs (to (Russia) SKA-Khabarovsk)
11	MF	NGA	Benjamin Teidi (to (Georgia (country)) Dinamo Batumi)
12	GK	LVA	Krišjānis Zviedris (on loan to (Lithuania) Atlantas)
14	DF	LVA	Endijs Šlampe (released)
18	FW	LVA	Ēriks Punculs (to Valmiera)
19	FW	SEN	Dame Guèye (loan return to (Senegal) Diambars)
20	FW	LVA	Ģirts Karlsons (released)
21	FW	LVA	Verners Apiņš (to Valmiera)
23	FW	LVA	Kristaps Grebis (to Grobiņa)
24	GK	ARM	Arsen Beglaryan (to (Belarus) Dnepr Mogilev)
29	MF	LVA	Toms Gucs (to Grobiņa)
30	MF	LVA	Jānis Krautmanis (to Valmiera)
32	GK	LVA	Gļebs Sopots (released)
33	FW	LVA	Deivids Drāznieks (to METTA/LU)
77	DF	LVA	Ņikita Bērenfelds (to Spartaks)
-	FW	LVA	Dēvids Dobrecovs (to (Lithuania) Atlantas, previously on loan at RTU FC)

=== Spartaks ===
In: Note: Flags indicate national team as defined under FIFA eligibility rules; some limited exceptions apply. Players may hold more than one non-FIFA nationality.

No.	Pos.	Nation	Player
—	GK	LVA	Vjačeslavs Serdcevs (from Super Nova)
—	GK	LVA	Vitālijs Meļņičenko (from Ventspils)
—	DF	LVA	Vitālijs Smirnovs (from Riga FC)
—	DF	LVA	Ņikita Bērenfelds (from Liepāja)
—	DF	LVA	Edgars Fjodorovs (from (Lithuania) Panevėžys)
—	DF	GHA	Aikins Kyei Baffour (from (Ghana) Liberty Professionals)
—	DF	NGA	Chinonso Alexander Ogwo (free agent)
—	DF	NGA	Lucky Onyebuchi Opara (from (Ivory Coast) Teco FC)
—	DF	LVA	Iļja Savčenko (from RFS)
—	MF	LVA	Vitālijs Rečickis (from Ventspils)
—	MF	LVA	Deniss Stradiņš (from Super Nova)
—	MF	FRA	Henrik Toth (free agent)
—	MF	SRB	Nemanja Belaković (from (Serbia) Čukarički)
—	MF	SEN	Barry Aly (free agent)
—	MF	LVA	Andrejs Kiriļins (from Jelgava)
—	MF	NGA	Chikezie Miracle Nwaorisa (free agent)
—	MF	CGO	Alexandre Obambot (from (Italy) Caronnese)
—	FW	CAN	Richlord Ennin (from (Italy) Castrovillari Calcio)
—	FW	CRO	Tin Vukmanić (from (Italy) Virtus Francavilla)
—	FW	FRA	Gabriel Charpentier (from (France) Nantes)
—	FW	NGA	Kingsley Charles Eleje (free agent)
—	FW	LVA	Rolands Vagančuks (from Valmiera)

Out: Note: Flags indicate national team as defined under FIFA eligibility rules; some limited exceptions apply. Players may hold more than one non-FIFA nationality.

No.	Pos.	Nation	Player
1	GK	LVA	Andrejs Pavlovs (released)
5	DF	BIH	Aleksandar Kosorić (to (Malta) Balzan)
6	MF	LVA	Andrejs Kovaļovs (to (Bulgaria) Vereya)
8	MF	BRA	Vitor Faíska (loan return to (Brazil) Boavista)
9	MF	LVA	Aleksejs Višņakovs (to Riga FC)
12	GK	LVA	Kristofers Minajevs (to Super Nova)
13	MF	LVA	Ingars Stuglis (to Ventspils)
15	MF	RUS	Artemi Maleyev (to (Russia) SKA-Khabarovsk)
17	FW	LVA	Kaspars Svārups (to Ventspils)
18	FW	ARG	Diego Ezequiel Aguirre (released)
20	FW	NCA	Ariagner Smith (to (Uzbekistan) Qizilqum Zarafshon)
21	DF	LTU	Tomas Mikuckis (to (Lithuania) Kauno Žalgiris)
27	DF	LVA	Pāvels Mihadjuks (to Tukums 2000)
69	FW	RUS	Denis Davydov (loan return to (Russia) Spartak Moscow)
85	GK	LVA	Mārcis Melecis (released)
89	FW	RUS	Aleksandr Prudnikov (to (Armenia) Alashkert Yerevan)
99	FW	RUS	Yevgeni Kobzar (on loan to (Armenia) Banants Yerevan)
-	MF	RUS	Sergei Eremenko (on loan to (Finland) SJK Seinäjoki, previously on loan at (Russia) Spartak Moscow)

=== Jelgava ===
In: Note: Flags indicate national team as defined under FIFA eligibility rules; some limited exceptions apply. Players may hold more than one non-FIFA nationality.

No.	Pos.	Nation	Player
—	GK	LVA	Germans Māliņš (from Riga FC)
—	DF	LVA	Renārs Rode (from (Republic of Ireland) Waterford)
—	DF	MNE	Momčilo Rašo (on loan from (Cyprus) AEL Limassol)
—	DF	NED	Jeremy Fernandes (from (Netherlands) Den Bosch)
—	DF	RUS	Artjoms Osipovs (from (Lithuania) Jonava)
—	MF	LVA	Eduards Emsis (from METTA/LU)
—	MF	LVA	Aleksandrs Cauņa (free agent)
—	MF	CYP	Stylianos Panteli (on loan from (Cyprus) AEL Limassol)
—	MF	GEO	Irakli Bidzinashvili (from (Armenia) Artsakh Yerevan)
—	MF	CRO	Jakov Biljan (from (Croatia) Dinamo Zagreb)
—	MF	LVA	Dāvis Indrāns (from RFS)
—	FW	LVA	Ņikita Ivanovs (from METTA/LU)
—	FW	LVA	Vsevolods Čamkins (from (Spain) Arosa SC)
—	FW	NED	Janyro Purperhart (from (Netherlands) Olympia Haarlem)
—	FW	LVA	Aivars Emsis (from Alberts)

Out: Note: Flags indicate national team as defined under FIFA eligibility rules; some limited exceptions apply. Players may hold more than one non-FIFA nationality.

No.	Pos.	Nation	Player
1	GK	LVA	Jānis Krūmiņš (to (Armenia) FC Yerevan)
3	DF	LTU	Sigitas Olberkis (to (Lithuania) Žalgiris)
5	DF	RUS	Vyacheslav Yemelyanenko (released)
8	MF	LVA	Alans Siņeļņikovs (to RFS)
9	MF	LVA	Daniils Ulimbaševs (loan return to RFS)
10	MF	JPN	Ryotaro Nakano (to (Thailand) Thai Honda)
12	DF	RUS	Maksim Shiryayev (to (Russia) Neftekhimik Nizhnekamsk)
14	MF	LVA	Maksims Rafaļskis (to Caramba Rīga)
17	MF	LVA	Andrejs Kiriļins (to Spartaks)
20	MF	LTU	Mindaugas Grigaravičius (to (Lithuania) Riteriai)
21	FW	LVA	Vladislavs Kozlovs (to Liepāja)
23	GK	LVA	Emīls Emulovs (to Liepāja)

=== METTA/LU ===
In: Note: Flags indicate national team as defined under FIFA eligibility rules; some limited exceptions apply. Players may hold more than one non-FIFA nationality.

No.	Pos.	Nation	Player
—	DF	LVA	Roberts Ķipsts (from RTU FC)
—	MF	LVA	Kristers Aldis Puriņš (from Smiltene)
—	FW	LVA	Deivids Drāznieks (from Liepāja)
—	FW	RSA	Kgotso Masangane (from (South Africa) Zone Mavo)

Out: Note: Flags indicate national team as defined under FIFA eligibility rules; some limited exceptions apply. Players may hold more than one non-FIFA nationality.

No.	Pos.	Nation	Player
2	DF	LVA	Dāvis Sandis Strods (to Tukums 2000)
3	DF	NGA	Usman Abbas (released)
6	MF	LVA	Eduards Emsis (to Jelgava)
7	FW	LBR	Van Dave Harmon (to (Czech Republic) 1. SC Znojmo)
9	FW	LVA	Vladislavs Fjodorovs (to Riga FC)
17	FW	LVA	Ņikita Ivanovs (to Jelgava)
22	MF	LBR	Sunnyboy Dolo (released)

=== Valmiera ===
In: Note: Flags indicate national team as defined under FIFA eligibility rules; some limited exceptions apply. Players may hold more than one non-FIFA nationality.

No.	Pos.	Nation	Player
—	GK	LVA	Vladislavs Lazarevs (from (Italy) Mantova)
—	GK	UKR	Andriy Fedorenko (from (Sweden) Umeå FC)
—	DF	BRA	Léo Lelis (from RTU FC)
—	MF	LVA	Jānis Krautmanis (from Liepāja)
—	MF	LVA	Boriss Bogdaškins (from Riga FC)
—	MF	LVA	Aleksejs Grjaznovs (from RTU FC)
—	MF	LVA	Edgars Jermolajevs (from RTU FC)
—	MF	LVA	Krišs Kārkliņš (from Riga FC)
—	MF	UKR	Oleksii Helovani (from (Ukraine) Olimpik Donetsk)
—	MF	JPN	Shunsuke Nakamura (from (Malta) Pietà Hotspurs)
—	MF	LVA	Vladislavs Soloveičiks (from (Russia) Zenit-2 Saint Petersburg)
—	MF	FRA	Pacifique Gbaguidi (from (France) Saint-Rémoise)
—	FW	LVA	Verners Apiņš (from Liepāja)
—	FW	LVA	Artis Jaudzems (from RFS)
—	FW	LVA	Ēriks Punculs (from Liepāja)

Out: Note: Flags indicate national team as defined under FIFA eligibility rules; some limited exceptions apply. Players may hold more than one non-FIFA nationality.

No.	Pos.	Nation	Player
1	GK	LVA	Kaspars Ribaks (to FK Auda)
7	FW	LVA	Konstantīns Fjodorovs (released)
8	MF	LVA	Eduards Stīpnieks (to Smiltene)
11	FW	LVA	Niks Savaļnieks (to FK Limbaži)
12	MF	LVA	Mārtiņš Dubro (to FK Priekuļi)
17	MF	LVA	Artūrs Pallo (released)
21	DF	SWE	Camron Nguesseu (to (Sweden) Karlslunds IF)
22	DF	LVA	Elmārs Sietiņsons (to Smiltene)
28	DF	LVA	Niks Rubezis (to Grobiņa)
32	DF	CRO	Ante Bakmaz (to (Lebanon) Nejmeh)
77	FW	NED	Rashid Browne (released)
81	GK	LVA	Marks Bogdanovs (released)
91	FW	LVA	Rolands Vagančuks (to Spartaks)
93	FW	SWE	Ricardo Gray (to (Sweden) FC Stockholm)

=== Daugavpils ===
In: Note: Flags indicate national team as defined under FIFA eligibility rules; some limited exceptions apply. Players may hold more than one non-FIFA nationality.

No.	Pos.	Nation	Player
—	GK	UKR	Danylo Kucher (from (Ukraine) Hirnyk Kryvyi Rih)
—	DF	AZE	Elvin Sarkarov (from (Azerbaijan) Neftçi)
—	DF	LVA	Daniels Balodis (on loan from RFS)
—	DF	CIV	Cédric Gogoua (from (Russia) SKA-Khabarovsk)
—	MF	AZE	Tural Bayramli (from (Azerbaijan) Sumgayit)
—	MF	COL	Alexis Ossa (free agent)
—	MF	LVA	Pāvels Truņins (from Auda)
—	MF	CIV	Peodoh Pacome Zouzoua (from (Ivory Coast) SC Gagnoa)
—	FW	LVA	Maksims Toņiševs (on loan from RFS)
—	FW	UKR	Bohdan Kovalenko (on loan from Riga FC)
—	FW	LVA	Igors Kovaļkovs (from (Spain) CD Alcalá)
—	FW	JPN	Kyosei Satake (from Rēzekne)

Out: Note: Flags indicate national team as defined under FIFA eligibility rules; some limited exceptions apply. Players may hold more than one non-FIFA nationality.

No.	Pos.	Nation	Player
13	MF	LVA	Jānis Bovins (to Krāslava)
17	DF	RUS	Stanislav Lebamba (released)
17	FW	LVA	Jegors Morozs (to Dinamo Rīga/Staicele)
18	FW	CIV	Cedric Kouadio (to RFS)
28	MF	LVA	Marks Deružinskis (to Rēzekne)
—	DF	LVA	Aleksandrs Ivanovs (released)
—	DF	LVA	Pāvels Liholetovs (released)
—	DF	LVA	Armands Snarskis (released)
—	DF	LVA	Deniss Ivanovs (released)
—	DF	LVA	Haralds Pakers (released)
—	MF	LVA	Dmitrijs Lomako (released)
—	MF	LVA	Pāvels Tarasovs (released)
—	MF	LVA	Vitālijs Dubrovskis (released)
—	FW	LVA	Romāns Salkovskis (released)
—	FW	BLR	Pavel Ryzhevski (released)
—	FW	LVA	Edgars Urbāns (released)
—	FW	LVA	Sergejs Vorobjovs (released)
