= List of Latvian football transfers summer 2019 =

This is a list of Latvian football transfers in the 2019 summer transfer window by club. Only transfers from the Virslīga are included.

== Latvian Higher League ==
=== Riga FC ===
In: Note: Flags indicate national team as defined under FIFA eligibility rules; some limited exceptions apply. Players may hold more than one non-FIFA nationality.

No.	Pos.	Nation	Player
—	DF	LVA	Ņikita Skļarenko (loan return from (Cyprus) Pafos FC)
—	DF	GRE	Giorgos Valerianos (on loan from (Cyprus) Pafos FC)
—	MF	NOR	Abdisalam Ibrahim (on loan from (Cyprus) Pafos FC)
—	MF	BRA	Roger (from (Albania) FK Kukësi)
—	MF	UKR	Vyacheslav Sharpar (from (Ukraine) Vorskla Poltava)
—	MF	LVA	Vladimirs Kamešs (from (Russia) SKA-Khabarovsk)
—	FW	LVA	Deniss Rakels (on loan from (Cyprus) Pafos FC)
—	FW	UKR	Roman Debelko (from (Ukraine) Karpaty Lviv)
—	FW	UKR	Miro Slavov (from (United Arab Emirates) Khor Fakkan Club)

Out: Note: Flags indicate national team as defined under FIFA eligibility rules; some limited exceptions apply. Players may hold more than one non-FIFA nationality.

No.	Pos.	Nation	Player
15	DF	GRE	Giorgos Valerianos (loan return to (Cyprus) Pafos FC)
16	MF	NOR	Abdisalam Ibrahim (loan return to (Cyprus) Pafos FC)
22	FW	SRB	Darko Lemajić (to RFS)
41	MF	JPN	Minori Sato (to (Russia) SKA-Khabarovsk)
77	FW	GEO	Davit Skhirtladze (to (Poland) Arka Gdynia)
99	FW	FRA	Kévin Bérigaud (loan return to (Cyprus) Pafos FC)
-	MF	EST	Bogdan Vaštšuk (to (Estonia) Levadia Tallinn, previously on loan at (Bulgaria) Levski Sofia)
-	MF	LVA	Kristers Čudars (to Liepāja, previously on loan at (Cyprus) Pafos FC)
-	FW	UKR	Bohdan Kovalenko (to (Ukraine) Chornomorets Odesa, previously on loan at Daugavpils)

=== Ventspils ===
In: Note: Flags indicate national team as defined under FIFA eligibility rules; some limited exceptions apply. Players may hold more than one non-FIFA nationality.

No.	Pos.	Nation	Player
—	GK	UKR	Kostyantyn Makhnovskyi (from (Ukraine) Desna Chernihiv)
—	DF	GEO	Giorgi Mchedlishvili (from (Croatia) HNK Gorica)
—	DF	LVA	Dmitrijs Klimaševičs (loan return from FC New Project)
—	DF	LVA	Mārtiņš Ēriks Veckāgans (from Spartaks)
—	DF	LVA	Aleksandrs Baturinskis (from FK Honda)
—	MF	LVA	Daniils Ulimbaševs (from Liepāja)
—	MF	BRA	Fabrício (on loan from (Denmark) Vejle Boldklub)
—	MF	BRA	Lucas Villela (from (Lithuania) FC Stumbras)
—	MF	BRA	João Ananias (from (Brazil) Joinville)
—	MF	GEO	Guga Palavandishvili (from (Poland) Podbeskidzie Bielsko-Biała)
—	MF	RUS	Beykhan Aliyev (from (Russia) Angusht Nazran)
—	FW	UKR	Mykhaylo Serhiychuk (from (Ukraine) Desna Chernihiv)

Out: Note: Flags indicate national team as defined under FIFA eligibility rules; some limited exceptions apply. Players may hold more than one non-FIFA nationality.

No.	Pos.	Nation	Player
7	MF	POR	Amâncio Fortes (to Liepāja)
9	FW	BRA	Jô Santos (to (Romania) FC Hermannstadt)
15	FW	NGA	Tosin Aiyegun (to (Switzerland) FC Zürich)
19	DF	LVA	Ņikita Koļesovs (on loan to (Romania) FC Botoșani)
20	MF	TOG	Dové Womé (to (Kuwait) Al-Yarmouk SC)
22	DF	MKD	Medjit Neziri (to (North Macedonia) KF Shkëndija)
23	MF	BRA	João Ananias (released)
26	FW	LVA	Kaspars Kokins (on loan to Daugavpils)
31	FW	RUS	Kirill Burykin (to (Russia) Salyut Belgorod)

=== RFS ===
In: Note: Flags indicate national team as defined under FIFA eligibility rules; some limited exceptions apply. Players may hold more than one non-FIFA nationality.

No.	Pos.	Nation	Player
—	DF	LTU	Edvinas Girdvainis (from (Azerbaijan) Keşla FK)
—	MF	LVA	Andrejs Cigaņiks (from (Netherlands) SC Cambuur)
—	MF	CRO	Tin Vukmanić (on loan from Spartaks)
—	FW	SRB	Darko Lemajić (from Riga FC)
—	FW	SRB	Andrija Kaluđerović (on loan from (Croatia) Inter Zaprešić)
—	FW	LVA	Dāvis Ikaunieks (on loan from (Czech Republic) FK Jablonec)

Out: Note: Flags indicate national team as defined under FIFA eligibility rules; some limited exceptions apply. Players may hold more than one non-FIFA nationality.

No.	Pos.	Nation	Player
9	FW	SVK	Tomáš Malec (to (Italy) Vis Pesaro)
14	FW	UKR	Maksym Marusych (to Jelgava)
20	FW	BDI	Bonfils Caleb Bimenyimana (to (Lithuania) Atlantas)
23	MF	UKR	Beka Vachiberadze (to (Belgium) Lommel SK)
38	MF	NGA	Elisha Obotu Young (on loan to Daugavpils)
71	FW	RUS	Maksim Maksimov (released)
-	FW	LVA	Marko Regža (on loan to Daugavpils, previously on loan at Super Nova)

=== Liepāja ===
In: Note: Flags indicate national team as defined under FIFA eligibility rules; some limited exceptions apply. Players may hold more than one non-FIFA nationality.

No.	Pos.	Nation	Player
—	GK	LVA	Krišjānis Zviedris (loan return from (Lithuania) Atlantas)
—	GK	LVA	Toms Vīksna (from FK Karosta)
—	DF	MLI	Clement Kanouté (from (Mali) CS Duguwolofila)
—	MF	POR	Amâncio Fortes (from Ventspils)
—	MF	LVA	Kristers Čudars (from Riga FC)
—	FW	AZE	Vugar Asgarov (from Daugavpils)
—	FW	LVA	Deivids Drāznieks (from METTA/LU)
—	FW	MLI	Aboubacar Camara (from (Mali) Real Bamako)
—	FW	CIV	Manucho (from (Tunisia) CS Sfaxien)

Out: Note: Flags indicate national team as defined under FIFA eligibility rules; some limited exceptions apply. Players may hold more than one non-FIFA nationality.

No.	Pos.	Nation	Player
1	GK	LVA	Kristaps Zommers (released)
8	MF	GHA	Prince Agyemang (to Valmiera)
11	FW	GEO	Mate Vatsadze (to (Uzbekistan) Qizilqum Zarafshon)
16	MF	LVA	Daniils Ulimbaševs (to Ventspils)
17	MF	LVA	Igors Kozlovs (to Jelgava)
21	FW	LVA	Vladislavs Kozlovs (released)
24	MF	LVA	Vladimirs Stepanovs (on loan to (Lithuania) FK Palanga)
29	FW	ARG	Lucas Delgado (to (Bolivia) Nacional Potosí)
30	MF	GEO	Luka Bakuradze (released)
34	DF	ARG	Gonzalo Negro (released)
45	DF	GHA	Ofosu Appiah (to Valmiera)

=== Spartaks ===
In: Note: Flags indicate national team as defined under FIFA eligibility rules; some limited exceptions apply. Players may hold more than one non-FIFA nationality.

No.	Pos.	Nation	Player
—	GK	LVA	Vladislavs Kapustins (from Auda)
—	DF	LVA	Klāvs Kramēns (from Valmiera)
—	DF	LVA	Jānis Krautmanis (from Valmiera)
—	DF	LVA	Verners Zalaks (from Daugavpils)
—	DF	NGA	Chidiebere Collins Agita (free agent)
—	DF	SEN	Ousmane Seye (from Super Nova)
—	MF	FIN	Sergei Eremenko (loan return from (Finland) SJK Seinäjoki)
—	MF	LVA	Igors Tarasovs (from (Poland) Śląsk Wrocław)
—	MF	LVA	Artjoms Druzenko (from Super Nova)
—	MF	NGA	Aliyu Yau Adam (free agent)
—	MF	NGA	Samiru Kwari Abdullahi (free agent)
—	MF	NGA	Stanley Nnanna Otu (free agent)
—	MF	LVA	Raivis Skrebels (from Daugavpils)
—	FW	LVA	Aivars Emsis (from Jelgava)

Out: Note: Flags indicate national team as defined under FIFA eligibility rules; some limited exceptions apply. Players may hold more than one non-FIFA nationality.

No.	Pos.	Nation	Player
2	DF	MDA	Ioan-Calin Revenco (released)
3	DF	GHA	Aikins Kyei Baffour (released)
6	MF	CGO	Alexandre Obambot (to (France) Saint-Pryvé Saint-Hilaire)
11	MF	FRA	Henrik Toth (released)
12	GK	LVA	Vjačeslavs Serdcevs (to (Germany) Optik Rathenow)
16	FW	NGA	Kingsley Eleje (released)
17	FW	FRA	Gabriel Charpentier (on loan to (Italy) U.S. Avellino 1912)
21	DF	LVA	Rolands Vagančuks (to FK Karosta)
24	DF	LVA	Edgars Fjodorovs (to (Germany) SV 90 Altengottern)
25	MF	LVA	Vitālijs Rečickis (to Jelgava)
27	MF	CRO	Tin Vukmanić (on loan to RFS)
28	MF	LVA	Andrejs Kiriļins (to (Lithuania) FK Palanga)
29	DF	LVA	Mārtiņš Ēriks Veckāgans (to Ventspils)
-	DF	LVA	Mārcis Ošs (loan extension at (Switzerland) Neuchâtel Xamax)

=== Jelgava ===
In: Note: Flags indicate national team as defined under FIFA eligibility rules; some limited exceptions apply. Players may hold more than one non-FIFA nationality.

No.	Pos.	Nation	Player
—	DF	UKR	Stanislav Mykytsey (from (Ukraine) FC Oleksandriya)
—	DF	LVA	Toms Lamša (from Super Nova)
—	MF	LVA	Igors Kozlovs (from Liepāja)
—	MF	LVA	Vitālijs Rečickis (from Spartaks)
—	MF	BLR	Alyaksandr Katlyaraw (from (Belarus) Torpedo-BelAZ Zhodino)
—	MF	GEO	Mate Tsintsadze (from (Georgia (country)) Torpedo Kutaisi)
—	FW	LVA	Artis Jaudzems (from Valmiera)
—	FW	RUS	Maksim Votinov (from (Russia) FC Tyumen)
—	FW	LVA	Aleksejs Davidenkovs (from (Italy) ASD Montefiascone)
—	FW	UKR	Maksym Marusych (from RFS)

Out: Note: Flags indicate national team as defined under FIFA eligibility rules; some limited exceptions apply. Players may hold more than one non-FIFA nationality.

No.	Pos.	Nation	Player
9	FW	LVA	Aivars Emsis (to Spartaks)
10	MF	GEO	Guram Lukava (to (Georgia (country)) FC Samtredia)
23	DF	RUS	Naim Sharifi (released)
24	FW	NED	Janyro Purperhart (released)
27	DF	MNE	Momčilo Rašo (loan return to (Cyprus) AEL Limassol)
29	MF	CYP	Stylianos Panteli (loan return to (Cyprus) AEL Limassol)
88	MF	LVA	Artjoms Vorobjovs (to Super Nova)
99	FW	LVA	Vsevolods Čamkins (to (Germany) SV 90 Altengottern)

=== METTA/LU ===
In: Note: Flags indicate national team as defined under FIFA eligibility rules; some limited exceptions apply. Players may hold more than one non-FIFA nationality.

No.	Pos.	Nation	Player
—	FW	LVA	Ričards Žaldovskis (from Daugavpils)
—	FW	BRA	Vinicius (from (Brazil) Água Santa)

Out: Note: Flags indicate national team as defined under FIFA eligibility rules; some limited exceptions apply. Players may hold more than one non-FIFA nationality.

No.	Pos.	Nation	Player
3	DF	NGA	Lukman Zakari (on loan to (Spain) Real Betis)
9	FW	LVA	Ņikita Kovaļonoks (to Dinamo Rīga/Staicele)
17	FW	LVA	Deivids Drāznieks (to Liepāja)

=== Valmiera ===
In: Note: Flags indicate national team as defined under FIFA eligibility rules; some limited exceptions apply. Players may hold more than one non-FIFA nationality.

No.	Pos.	Nation	Player
—	GK	LVA	Rūdolfs Oskars Soloha (from (England) Nottingham Forest)
—	GK	RUS	Vlad Eleferenko (from (Russia) Saturn Ramenskoye)
—	DF	NGA	Olaide Muhammed Badmus (free agent)
—	DF	GHA	Ofosu Appiah (from Liepāja)
—	MF	GHA	Prince Agyemang (from Liepāja)
—	MF	NGA	Abdullahi Abiodun Saliyu (free agent)
—	FW	NGA	Toluwalase Arokodare (free agent)
—	FW	UKR	Kostiantyn Chernii (from (Ukraine) Kremin Kremenchuk)
—	FW	POR	Jorge Teixeira (from (Portugal) C.D. Cinfães)

Out: Note: Flags indicate national team as defined under FIFA eligibility rules; some limited exceptions apply. Players may hold more than one non-FIFA nationality.

No.	Pos.	Nation	Player
1	GK	UKR	Andriy Fedorenko (to (Ukraine) Podillya Khmelnytskyi)
2	DF	LVA	Klāvs Kramēns (to Spartaks)
14	FW	LVA	Ulvis Bērziņš (to Smiltene)
16	GK	LVA	Elvis Arnavs (to Staiceles Bebri)
17	DF	LVA	Jānis Krautmanis (to Spartaks)
18	FW	UKR	Kostiantyn Chernii (to (Ukraine) Metalurh Zaporizhya)
19	FW	LVA	Artis Jaudzems (to Jelgava)
20	MF	LVA	Valts Jaunzems (to Smiltene)
23	MF	LVA	Artūrs Bankavs (to Auda)
39	MF	LVA	Dāvis Rutks (to Smiltene)
81	MF	LVA	Vladislavs Soloveičiks (loan return to (Russia) Zenit Saint Petersburg)

=== Daugavpils ===
In: Note: Flags indicate national team as defined under FIFA eligibility rules; some limited exceptions apply. Players may hold more than one non-FIFA nationality.

No.	Pos.	Nation	Player
—	DF	KAZ	Maksim Grek (from Super Nova)
—	DF	AZE	Ali Shirinov (from (Azerbaijan) Neftçi PFK)
—	DF	NGA	Idowu David Akintola (from (Nigeria) Real Sapphire FC)
—	MF	LVA	Andrejs Kovaļovs (from (Bulgaria) FC Vereya)
—	MF	BRA	Yuri (from (Estonia) JK Järve)
—	MF	NGA	Elisha Obotu Young (on loan from RFS)
—	MF	RUS	Andrei Mironov (from (Russia) Torpedo Moscow)
—	FW	CIV	Mory Koné (from (Ivory Coast) Lys Sassandra)
—	FW	LVA	Kaspars Kokins (on loan from Ventspils)
—	FW	LVA	Marko Regža (on loan from RFS)
—	FW	NGA	Nnamdi Chinonso Offor (from (Nigeria) Real Sapphire FC)

Out: Note: Flags indicate national team as defined under FIFA eligibility rules; some limited exceptions apply. Players may hold more than one non-FIFA nationality.

No.	Pos.	Nation	Player
4	DF	CIV	Cédric Gogoua (to (Russia) FC Tambov)
5	DF	AZE	Elvin Sarkarov (loan return to (Azerbaijan) Neftçi PFK)
6	MF	CIV	Peodoh Pacome Zouzoua (released)
7	FW	LVA	Ričards Žaldovskis (to METTA/LU)
8	MF	LVA	Raivis Skrebels (to Spartaks)
9	FW	AZE	Vugar Asgarov (to Liepāja)
10	MF	LVA	Iļja Ševčuks (to (Germany) Optik Rathenow)
11	MF	COL	Alexis Ossa (to (Dominican Republic) Atlético Pantoja)
12	FW	CIV	Mory Koné (to (Armenia) Shirak SC)
17	FW	LVA	Igors Kovaļkovs (to (Spain) Club Olímpico de Totana)
25	FW	JPN	Kyosei Satake (released)
27	DF	LVA	Verners Zalaks (to Spartaks)
39	MF	AZE	Tural Bayramli (to (Azerbaijan) Keşla FK)
97	FW	UKR	Bohdan Kovalenko (loan return to Riga FC)
