= List of Latvian football transfers winter 2019–20 =

This is a list of Latvian football transfers in the 2019–20 winter transfer window by club. Only transfers of the Latvian Higher League are included.

== Latvian Higher League ==
=== Riga FC ===
In: Note: Flags indicate national team as defined under FIFA eligibility rules; some limited exceptions apply. Players may hold more than one non-FIFA nationality.

No.	Pos.	Nation	Player
—	GK	LAT	Iļja Isajevs (from Tukums)
—	DF	POR	Talocha (from (Greece) Atromitos F.C.)
—	MF	COD	Jordan Nkololo (from (Croatia) NK Istra 1961)
—	MF	BRA	Stênio Júnior (from (North Macedonia) KF Shkëndija)
—	MF	RUS	Danila Yanov (from (Russia) CSKA Moscow)
—	MF	SRB	Marko Đurišić (from (Serbia) FK Vojvodina)
—	MF	COL	Brayan Angulo (on loan from (Cyprus) Pafos FC)
—	MF	LAT	Vladimirs Kamešs (from (Russia) Chayka Peschanokopskoye)
—	FW	ISL	Stefan Ljubičić (from (Iceland) Grindavík)
—	FW	CZE	Jakub Hora (on loan from (Czech Republic) FK Teplice)
—	FW	COD	Kule Mbombo (from (Kazakhstan) FC Kaisar)

Out: Note: Flags indicate national team as defined under FIFA eligibility rules; some limited exceptions apply. Players may hold more than one non-FIFA nationality.

No.	Pos.	Nation	Player
1	GK	LAT	Maksims Uvarenko (to (Norway) Levanger FK)
6	MF	LAT	Vladimirs Kamešs (to (Russia) Chayka Peschanokopskoye)
10	MF	LAT	Aleksejs Višņakovs (released)
13	DF	LAT	Vladislavs Gabovs (to Liepāja)
19	FW	POL	Kamil Biliński (to (Poland) Podbeskidzie Bielsko-Biała)
23	MF	LAT	Ivans Lukjanovs (to RFS)
25	MF	CRO	Tomislav Šarić (to RFS)
92	FW	LAT	Deniss Rakels (loan return to (Cyprus) Pafos FC)
95	DF	FRA	Joël Bopesu (to (Ukraine) FC Lviv)
99	FW	UKR	Miro Slavov (to (Iran) Shahr Khodro)
-	FW	ISL	Stefan Ljubičić (released)

=== RFS ===
In: Note: Flags indicate national team as defined under FIFA eligibility rules; some limited exceptions apply. Players may hold more than one non-FIFA nationality.

No.	Pos.	Nation	Player
—	GK	UKR	Danylo Kucher (from Daugavpils)
—	DF	NED	Jeremy Fernandes (from Jelgava)
—	DF	BRA	John (on loan from (Brazil) Fluminense U20)
—	DF	SLO	Žiga Lipušček (from (Slovenia) ND Gorica)
—	DF	BLR	Mikhail Babichev (from (Belarus) Neman Grodno)
—	DF	CRO	Luka Smoljo (from (Croatia) NK Lokomotiva Zagreb)
—	MF	LAT	Maksims Toņiševs (loan return from Daugavpils)
—	MF	NGR	Elisha Obotu Young (loan return from Daugavpils)
—	MF	LAT	Anastasijs Mordatenko (from Ventspils)
—	MF	JPN	Tatsuro Nagamatsu (from (South Korea) Mokpo City)
—	MF	LTU	Jonas Skinderis (from (Lithuania) FK Panevėžys)
—	MF	BRA	Emerson Deocleciano (on loan from (Croatia) NK Lokomotiva Zagreb)
—	MF	LAT	Jēkabs Lagūns (from METTA)
—	MF	ARG	Leonel Strumia (from Liepāja)
—	MF	CRO	Tomislav Šarić (from Riga FC)
—	MF	LAT	Ivans Lukjanovs (from Riga FC)
—	FW	LAT	Marko Regža (loan return from Daugavpils)
—	FW	BDI	Bonfils-Caleb Bimenyimana (loan return from (Lithuania) FK Atlantas)
—	FW	LAT	Renārs Varslavāns (from METTA)
—	FW	UKR	Vitaliy Kvashuk (from (Belarus) FC Gomel)

Out: Note: Flags indicate national team as defined under FIFA eligibility rules; some limited exceptions apply. Players may hold more than one non-FIFA nationality.

No.	Pos.	Nation	Player
7	MF	CRO	Slavko Blagojević (to (Croatia) NK Istra 1961)
8	MF	LAT	Aleksandrs Fertovs (released)
10	MF	LAT	Gļebs Kļuškins (to (Lithuania) FK Sūduva)
14	MF	LAT	Andrejs Cigaņiks (to (Ukraine) Zorya Luhansk)
16	GK	LAT	Daniils Isačenko (to SK Super Nova)
19	DF	LAT	Vitālijs Jagodinskis (to Valmiera)
21	MF	LAT	Alans Siņeļņikovs (to Jelgava)
25	MF	JPN	Takayuki Seto (to (Romania) Astra Giurgiu)
27	MF	CRO	Tin Vukmanić (loan return to Spartaks)
28	MF	NGR	Alex Olabanjo Ogunji (on loan to Jelgava)
31	DF	LAT	Nauris Bulvītis (to Spartaks)
32	GK	LAT	Dmitrijs Grigorjevs (to Jelgava)
77	FW	NGR	Emeka Basil (on loan to Jelgava)
94	FW	LAT	Dāvis Ikaunieks (loan return to (Czech Republic) FK Jablonec)
93	DF	LTU	Edvinas Girdvainis (to (Germany) KFC Uerdingen 05)
99	FW	SRB	Andrija Kaluđerović (loan return to (Croatia) Inter Zaprešić)
-	DF	LAT	Daniels Balodis (on loan to Jelgava, previously on loan at Daugavpils)
-	DF	NED	Jeremy Fernandes (released)
-	MF	JPN	Tatsuro Nagamatsu (to Daugavpils)

=== Ventspils ===
In: Note: Flags indicate national team as defined under FIFA eligibility rules; some limited exceptions apply. Players may hold more than one non-FIFA nationality.

No.	Pos.	Nation	Player
—	GK	NGR	Dele Alampasu (from (Portugal) C.D. Feirense)
—	GK	RUS	Danil Shkavrov (from (Armenia) FC Noah)
—	DF	GEO	Giorgi Rekhviashvili (from (Georgia (country)) Saburtalo Tbilisi)
—	DF	UKR	Andriy Sakhnevych (from (Ukraine) Kolos Kovalivka)
—	MF	RUS	Yevgeni Kozlov (from (Belarus) Shakhtyor Soligorsk)
—	MF	GEO	Giorgi Eristavi (from (Georgia (country)) FC Telavi)
—	MF	BRA	Fabinho (from (Ukraine) Olimpik Donetsk)
—	FW	LAT	Kaspars Kokins (loan return from Daugavpils)
—	FW	NGR	Kazeem Ojo Aderounmu (from (Nigeria) Real Sapphire FC)
—	FW	FRA	Chris Marlon Ondong-Mba (from (Slovakia) ŠKF Sereď)
—	FW	NGR	Christian Pyagbara (from (Nigeria) Heartland F.C.)

Out: Note: Flags indicate national team as defined under FIFA eligibility rules; some limited exceptions apply. Players may hold more than one non-FIFA nationality.

No.	Pos.	Nation	Player
1	GK	LAT	Ivans Baturins (to Tukums)
2	DF	HAI	Jean Sony Alcénat (released)
6	MF	RUS	Pavel Osipov (released)
8	MF	LAT	Jevgēņijs Kazačoks (to Jelgava)
9	FW	UKR	Mykhaylo Serhiychuk (released)
11	MF	NGR	Abdullahi Alfa (released)
12	GK	LAT	Vjačeslavs Kudrjavcevs (to (Poland) Stomil Olsztyn)
17	MF	LAT	Anastasijs Mordatenko (to RFS)
27	MF	LAT	Romāns Mickevičs (to Tukums)
28	DF	LAT	Dmitrijs Klimaševičs (released)
33	DF	BRA	Hélio (released)
36	MF	BRA	Fabrício (loan return to (Denmark) Vejle Boldklub)
77	FW	RUS	Bekkhan Aliev (released)
-	DF	LAT	Ņikita Koļesovs (to (Norway) Alta IF, previously on loan at (Romania) FC Botoșani)

=== Valmiera ===
In: Note: Flags indicate national team as defined under FIFA eligibility rules; some limited exceptions apply. Players may hold more than one non-FIFA nationality.

No.	Pos.	Nation	Player
—	GK	UKR	Andriy Kozhukhar (from (Ukraine) Chornomorets Odesa)
—	DF	FRA	Junior Kingue (from (France) Red Star F.C.)
—	DF	LAT	Vitālijs Jagodinskis (from RFS)
—	DF	FRA	Joshua Kudu (from (Germany) TV Jahn Hiesfeld)
—	DF	FRA	Julien Celestine (from (Belgium) URSL Visé)
—	DF	LAT	Gatis Štrauss (from SK Super Nova)
—	DF	SEN	Pape Yare Fall (free agent)
—	MF	LAT	Kristaps Liepa (from METTA/LU)
—	MF	LAT	Bogdans Samoilovs (from (Germany) 1. FC Köln U-19)
—	MF	UKR	Mykola Musolitin (from (Ukraine) Chornomorets Odesa)
—	MF	LAT	Rūdolfs Zeņģis (from SK Super Nova)
—	MF	GEO	Luka Silagadze (from (Georgia (country)) FC Rustavi)
—	MF	SEN	Mohamed Victor Diagne (from (Senegal) AS Douanes)
—	MF	TUN	Motaz Zaddem (from (Tunisia) Étoile Sportive du Sahel)
—	FW	KAZ	Samat Sarsenov (from (Kazakhstan) FC Kairat)
—	FW	SEN	Ibrahima Ndiape Sow (free agent)

Out: Note: Flags indicate national team as defined under FIFA eligibility rules; some limited exceptions apply. Players may hold more than one non-FIFA nationality.

No.	Pos.	Nation	Player
5	DF	GHA	Ofosu Appiah (to (Estonia) Narva Trans)
8	MF	LAT	Boriss Bogdaškins (to Tukums)
11	FW	LAT	Verners Apiņš (to Staiceles Bebri)
16	MF	GHA	Prince Agyemang (released)
18	DF	LAT	Roberts Cipe (released)
25	MF	LAT	Edgars Jermolajevs (released)
30	MF	BEN	Pacifique Gbaguidi (released)
37	FW	LAT	Gatis Kalniņš (retired)
41	MF	JPN	Shunsuke Nakamura (to (Indonesia) Persela Lamongan)
93	DF	BRA	Léo Lelis (released)

=== Spartaks ===
In: Note: Flags indicate national team as defined under FIFA eligibility rules; some limited exceptions apply. Players may hold more than one non-FIFA nationality.

No.	Pos.	Nation	Player
—	GK	LAT	Dāvis Ošs (from METTA)
—	DF	LAT	Nauris Bulvītis (from RFS)
—	DF	UAE	Abduraheem Abdurahman (from (United Arab Emirates) Al Wahda FC)
—	DF	MDA	Anatolie Prepeliță (from (Moldova) Zimbru Chișinău)
—	DF	CIV	Badra Ali Camara (from (Ivory Coast) Academie Felix Houphouet Boigny)
—	MF	UKR	Kyrylo Dryshlyuk (from (Ukraine) FC Oleksandriya)
—	MF	FRA	Didine Djouhary (from (France) AS Lyon-Duchère)
—	MF	CIV	Meboue Assa Traoré (from (Ivory Coast) Academie Felix Houphouet Boigny)
—	MF	NGR	Pam Dalyop Samuel (from (Nigeria) Gee-Lec International Football Academy)
—	MF	NGR	Christian Junior Uchenna (from (Nigeria) Hopeland FC)
—	FW	NCA	Ariagner Smith (from (Uzbekistan) Lokomotiv Tashkent)
—	FW	LAT	Eduards Višņakovs (on loan from (Belarus) Shakhtyor Soligorsk)
—	FW	PAN	Newton Williams (from (Panama) Costa del Este F.C.)

Out: Note: Flags indicate national team as defined under FIFA eligibility rules; some limited exceptions apply. Players may hold more than one non-FIFA nationality.

No.	Pos.	Nation	Player
4	DF	LAT	Vitālijs Smirnovs (released)
5	DF	LAT	Gints Freimanis (to Saldus SS/Leevon)
7	MF	LAT	Edgars Vardanjans (to Liepāja)
9	FW	CAN	Richie Ennin (on loan to (Lithuania) FK Žalgiris)
14	MF	LAT	Deniss Stradiņš (to Jelgava)
18	GK	LAT	Vitālijs Meļņičenko (to (Norway) Lysekloster IL)
19	DF	LAT	Ričards Korzāns (to Jelgava)
22	FW	LAT	Edgars Gauračs (to Rēzeknes FA/BJSS)
23	DF	LAT	Ingus Šlampe (to Jelgava)
32	MF	LAT	Igors Tarasovs (to (Hungary) Kaposvári Rákóczi)
-	MF	CRO	Tin Vukmanić (on loan to (Belarus) Shakhtyor Soligorsk, previously on loan at RFS)
-	MF	CIV	Meboue Assa Traoré (on loan to SK Super Nova)
-	MF	NGR	Christian Junior Uchenna (on loan to SK Super Nova)

=== Liepāja ===
In: Note: Flags indicate national team as defined under FIFA eligibility rules; some limited exceptions apply. Players may hold more than one non-FIFA nationality.

No.	Pos.	Nation	Player
—	DF	BRA	Gerson (from (Brazil) Centro Sportivo Alagoano)
—	DF	TUN	Rami Bedoui (from (Tunisia) Étoile Sportive du Sahel)
—	DF	NGR	Ahmed Oladipupo Lawal (from Liepāja Football Academy Nigeria)
—	DF	NGR	William Blessing (from Liepāja Football Academy Nigeria)
—	DF	LAT	Vladislavs Gabovs (from Riga FC)
—	DF	MNE	Marko Simić (from (Uzbekistan) Pakhtakor Tashkent)
—	MF	GHA	Seidu Yahaya (from (Belarus) Dinamo Minsk)
—	MF	LAT	Edgars Vardanjans (from Spartaks)
—	MF	NGR	Peter Court Ebiobowei (from Liepāja Football Academy Nigeria)
—	MF	NGR	Dele Ola Israel (from Liepāja Football Academy Nigeria)
—	MF	NGR	John Etim Enoto (from Liepāja Football Academy Nigeria)
—	MF	NGR	Ukpa Effiong Hogan (from Liepāja Football Academy Nigeria)
—	FW	LAT	Artūrs Karašausks (from (Cyprus) Pafos FC)
—	FW	UKR	Dmytro Semeniv (from (Ukraine) Chornomorets Odesa)
—	FW	NGR	James Oghenekewaro (from Liepāja Football Academy Nigeria)
—	FW	BLR	Filip Ivanow (from (Belarus) Dinamo Minsk)

Out: Note: Flags indicate national team as defined under FIFA eligibility rules; some limited exceptions apply. Players may hold more than one non-FIFA nationality.

No.	Pos.	Nation	Player
4	MF	LAT	Kristers Tobers (to (Poland) Lechia Gdańsk, previously on loan)
5	MF	ARG	Leonel Strumia (to RFS)
7	MF	LAT	Dmitrijs Hmizs (released)
10	MF	LAT	Jānis Ikaunieks (to (Norway) Strømsgodset)
14	DF	LAT	Gatis Lūks (to Tukums)
33	FW	LAT	Deivids Drāznieks (to Grobiņas SC)
41	DF	LAT	Roberts Jaunarājs-Janvāris (to Tukums)
88	FW	CIV	Manucho (to (Estonia) Levadia Tallinn)
94	FW	MDA	Dan Spătaru (to (Armenia) FC Noah)
99	FW	AZE	Vugar Asgarov (to Daugavpils)
-	MF	LAT	Vladimirs Stepanovs (released, previously on loan at (Lithuania) FK Palanga)

=== Jelgava ===
In: Note: Flags indicate national team as defined under FIFA eligibility rules; some limited exceptions apply. Players may hold more than one non-FIFA nationality.

No.	Pos.	Nation	Player
—	GK	LAT	Dmitrijs Grigorjevs (from RFS)
—	DF	LAT	Ingus Šlampe (from Spartaks)
—	DF	LAT	Ričards Korzāns (from Spartaks)
—	DF	LAT	Daniels Balodis (on loan from RFS)
—	DF	LAT	Eduards Deičs (from Smiltene/BJSS)
—	DF	UKR	Volodymyr Kirychuk (from (Ukraine) MFC Mykolaiv)
—	DF	UKR	Dmytro Semenov (from (Ukraine) FC Oleksandriya)
—	MF	LAT	Alans Siņeļņikovs (from RFS)
—	MF	LAT	Deniss Stradiņš (from Spartaks)
—	MF	NGR	Alex Olabanjo Ogunji (on loan from RFS)
—	MF	UKR	Artem Radchenko (from (Ukraine) MFC Mykolaiv)
—	MF	LAT	Jevgēņijs Kazačoks (from Ventspils)
—	FW	NGR	Emeka Basil (on loan from RFS)
—	FW	UKR	Yurii Holubka (from (Ukraine) FC Kalush)
—	FW	LAT	Aleksejs Davidenkovs (from (Italy) A.S.D Montefiascone Calcio)
—	FW	UKR	Yuriy Zakharkiv (from (Tajikistan) FK Khujand)

Out: Note: Flags indicate national team as defined under FIFA eligibility rules; some limited exceptions apply. Players may hold more than one non-FIFA nationality.

No.	Pos.	Nation	Player
1	GK	LAT	Germans Māliņš (to (Sweden) Nordvärmlands FF)
3	DF	LAT	Renārs Rode (to JDFS Alberts)
4	MF	CRO	Jakov Biljan (to (Croatia) HNK Vukovar '91)
6	MF	CUW	Yaël Eisden (to (Greece) Platanias F.C.)
9	MF	BLR	Alyaksandr Katlyaraw (to (Belarus) Slavia Mozyr)
10	FW	UKR	Maksym Marusych (released)
12	DF	RUS	Artjoms Osipovs (released)
14	MF	GEO	Irakli Bidzinashvili (to (Georgia (country)) Dila Gori)
16	MF	LAT	Vitālijs Rečickis (released)
21	MF	LAT	Eduards Emsis (to (Armenia) FC Noah)
22	DF	NED	Jeremy Fernandes (to RFS)
23	MF	GEO	Mate Tsintsadze (to (Georgia (country)) Dinamo Batumi)
28	MF	LAT	Artis Lazdiņš (to Saldus SS/Leevon)
45	FW	RUS	Maksim Votinov (released)
53	DF	UKR	Stanislav Mykytsey (to (Ukraine) Chornomorets Odesa)
77	DF	LAT	Viktors Litvinskis (to Daugavpils)
-	FW	LAT	Aleksejs Davidenkovs (on loan to SK Super Nova)

=== Daugavpils ===
In: Note: Flags indicate national team as defined under FIFA eligibility rules; some limited exceptions apply. Players may hold more than one non-FIFA nationality.

No.	Pos.	Nation	Player
—	GK	RUS	Nodari Kalichava (on loan from (Russia) Zenit Saint Petersburg)
—	DF	LAT	Viktors Litvinskis (from Jelgava)
—	DF	RUS	Anton Miterev (from (Belarus) NFK Minsk)
—	DF	NGR	Joshua Akpudje (from (Nigeria) MFM F.C.)
—	DF	GHA	Daniel Adjetey (from (Denmark) Næstved BK)
—	MF	RUS	Kirill Makeyev (on loan from (Russia) Zenit Saint Petersburg)
—	MF	KAZ	Ramazan Orazov (from (Kazakhstan) FC Kairat)
—	MF	AZE	Orkhan Gurbanli (on loan from (Azerbaijan) Sabail FK)
—	MF	UKR	Stanislav Nechyporenko (from (Ukraine) Kremin Kremenchuk)
—	MF	LAT	Raivis Ķiršs (from SK Super Nova)
—	MF	JPN	Tatsuro Nagamatsu (from RFS)
—	FW	AZE	Vugar Asgarov (from Liepāja)

Out: Note: Flags indicate national team as defined under FIFA eligibility rules; some limited exceptions apply. Players may hold more than one non-FIFA nationality.

No.	Pos.	Nation	Player
4	DF	LAT	Daniels Balodis (loan return to RFS)
13	GK	UKR	Danylo Kucher (to RFS)
18	FW	LAT	Marko Regža (loan return to RFS)
23	MF	LAT	Maksims Toņiševs (loan return to RFS)
24	MF	COL	Naisir Carmona (released)
26	FW	LAT	Kaspars Kokins (loan return to Ventspils)
28	MF	NGR	Elisha Obotu Young (loan return to RFS)
30	DF	LAT	Jurijs Sokolovs (retired)
39	FW	BRA	Yuri (to SK Super Nova)
42	MF	BRA	Marcinho (released)
70	DF	AZE	Ali Shirinov (to (Azerbaijan) Zira FK)
81	DF	KAZ	Maksim Grek (to (Belarus) Belshina Bobruisk)

=== METTA ===
In: Note: Flags indicate national team as defined under FIFA eligibility rules; some limited exceptions apply. Players may hold more than one non-FIFA nationality.

No.	Pos.	Nation	Player
—	DF	BRA	Franklin (from (Croatia) NK Lokomotiva Zagreb)
—	MF	AUT	Stefan Barac (from (Austria) Wiener Sport-Club)
—	MF	BRA	Danilo Perassoli (from (Brazil) Red Bull Brasil)
—	FW	SWE	Sylvin Kayembe (from (Israel) Hapoel Ironi Kiryat Shmona)

Out: Note: Flags indicate national team as defined under FIFA eligibility rules; some limited exceptions apply. Players may hold more than one non-FIFA nationality.

No.	Pos.	Nation	Player
4	DF	LAT	Kirils Ševeļovs (retired)
5	DF	RSA	Kabelo Seriba (released)
8	MF	LAT	Kristaps Liepa (to Valmiera)
10	MF	RUS	Tamirlan Dzhamalutdinov (to (Bosnia and Herzegovina) Čelik Zenica)
16	FW	LAT	Renārs Varslavāns (to RFS)
22	FW	BRA	Vinicius Veneranda (released)
24	GK	LAT	Dāvis Ošs (to Spartaks)
33	MF	LAT	Jēkabs Lagūns (to RFS)

=== Tukums ===
In: Note: Flags indicate national team as defined under FIFA eligibility rules; some limited exceptions apply. Players may hold more than one non-FIFA nationality.

No.	Pos.	Nation	Player
—	GK	UKR	Maksym Kuchynskyi (from (Georgia (country)) Dinamo Batumi)
—	GK	LAT	Ivans Baturins (from Ventspils)
—	DF	LAT	Gatis Lūks (from Liepāja)
—	DF	LAT	Roberts Jaunarājs-Janvāris (from Liepāja)
—	DF	UKR	Oleh Tarasenko (from (Poland) Stomil Olsztyn)
—	DF	FRA	Mathurin Sakho (from (France) US Lusitanos Saint-Maur)
—	DF	FRA	Alonzo Rodrigues (from (France) Jura Sud Foot)
—	DF	BLR	Pavel Kruk (from (Lithuania) FK Panevėžys)
—	DF	LTU	Edgaras Žarskis (from (Belarus) FC Gorodeya)
—	MF	LAT	Boriss Bogdaškins (from Valmiera)
—	MF	LAT	Romāns Mickevičs (from Ventspils)
—	MF	LAT	Ņikita Pačko (from (Moldova) Dinamo-Auto Tiraspol)
—	MF	POL	Mateusz Cetnarski (from (Poland) Stomil Olsztyn)
—	MF	BLR	Anton Kavalyow (on loan from (Belarus) Shakhtyor Soligorsk)
—	FW	ALG	Mehdi Fennouche (from (Bulgaria) Cherno More Varna)
—	FW	BLR	Yevgeniy Kozel (on loan from (Belarus) Shakhtyor Soligorsk)

Out: Note: Flags indicate national team as defined under FIFA eligibility rules; some limited exceptions apply. Players may hold more than one non-FIFA nationality.

No.	Pos.	Nation	Player
1	GK	LAT	Iļja Isajevs (to Riga FC)
14	MF	LAT	Vadims Avdejevs (to SK Super Nova)
18	FW	JPN	Shuma Nagamatsu (to (Poland) Świt Szczecin)
23	FW	FRA	Louis Pahama (to (France) SC Toulon)
94	MF	FRA	Terrence Muimba (released)
-	DF	UKR	Oleh Tarasenko (released)
-	DF	FRA	Mathurin Sakho (released)
-	DF	FRA	Alonzo Rodrigues (released)
-	DF	BLR	Pavel Kruk (released)
-	MF	BLR	Anton Kavalyow (loan return to (Belarus) Shakhtyor Soligorsk)
-	FW	ALG	Mehdi Fennouche (released)
-	FW	BLR	Yevgeniy Kozel (loan return to (Belarus) Shakhtyor Soligorsk)
