= List of Latvian football transfers winter 2020–21 =

This is a list of Latvian football transfers in the 2020–21 winter transfer window by club. Only transfers of the Latvian Higher League are included.

== Latvian Higher League ==
=== Riga FC ===
In: Note: Flags indicate national team as defined under FIFA eligibility rules; some limited exceptions apply. Players may hold more than one non-FIFA nationality.

No.	Pos.	Nation	Player
—	GK	CRO	Ivan Brkić (from (Bosnia and Herzegovina) Zrinjski Mostar)
—	GK	LVA	Frenks Orols (from SK Super Nova)
—	DF	SRB	Miloš Vranjanin (from (Serbia) Metalac)
—	DF	ISL	Axel Óskar Andrésson (from (Norway) Viking)
—	DF	MNE	Matija Pejović (from (Montenegro) Rudar Pljevlja)
—	MF	BIH	Adnan Šećerović (from (Greece) Larissa)
—	MF	FIN	Mikael Soisalo (from (Belgium) Zulte Waregem)
—	MF	SRB	Nedeljko Piščević (from (Serbia) Javor Ivanjica)
—	MF	BRA	Gabriel Ramos (from (Belarus) Torpedo-BelAZ Zhodino)
—	MF	LVA	Raivis Ķiršs (from Daugavpils)
—	MF	ARM	Edgar Babayan (from (Denmark) Hobro IK)
—	MF	BRA	Lipe Veloso (from (Ukraine) FC Lviv)
—	MF	RUS	Danila Yanov (loan return from (Cyprus) Pafos FC)
—	MF	CMR	Martin Assomo (from (Cameroon) AS Fortuna Mfou)
—	MF	LVA	Arturs Krancmanis (from FK Auda)
—	FW	FRA	Jean-Baptiste Léo (from (Greece) PAS Giannina)

Out: Note: Flags indicate national team as defined under FIFA eligibility rules; some limited exceptions apply. Players may hold more than one non-FIFA nationality.

No.	Pos.	Nation	Player
6	MF	ARG	Federico Bravo (to (Argentina) Club Atlético Sarmiento)
10	MF	BRA	Roger (to (Romania) UTA Arad)
11	MF	UKR	Vyacheslav Sharpar (to (Ukraine) Volyn Lutsk)
18	MF	CZE	Jakub Hora (loan return to (Czech Republic) Teplice)
19	DF	ALB	Herdi Prenga (to (Hungary) Kisvárda FC)
21	DF	LVA	Elvis Stuglis (to RFS)
22	FW	COD	Kule Mbombo (on loan to (Lithuania) FK Sūduva)
23	MF	POR	Pedrinho (to (Portugal) Gil Vicente)
26	MF	SRB	Stefan Panić (to (Cyprus) Pafos)
27	FW	UKR	Roman Debelko (to (Belarus) Shakhtyor Soligorsk)
35	MF	COD	Jordan Nkololo (to (Ukraine) Volyn Lutsk)
91	MF	BRA	Dário Junior (to (Vietnam) Ho Chi Minh City)
—	GK	LVA	Frenks Orols (on loan to Daugavpils)
—	DF	MNE	Matija Pejović (on loan to (Montenegro) Rudar Pljevlja)
—	MF	LVA	Raivis Ķiršs (on loan to Daugavpils)
—	FW	BRA	Moresche (to (Singapore) Geylang International, previously on loan at (Belarus) Torpedo-BelAZ Zhodino)

=== RFS ===
In: Note: Flags indicate national team as defined under FIFA eligibility rules; some limited exceptions apply. Players may hold more than one non-FIFA nationality.

No.	Pos.	Nation	Player
—	GK	LTU	Vytautas Černiauskas (from (Bulgaria) CSKA Sofia)
—	GK	LVA	Valentīns Raļkevičs (from Liepāja)
—	DF	LVA	Elvis Stuglis (from Riga FC)
—	DF	GAM	Alfusainey Jatta (from (Czech Republic) MFK Vyškov)
—	MF	NGA	Olabanjo Ogunji (loan return from Tukums)
—	MF	BRA	Lucas Villela (from Ventspils)
—	MF	MKD	Jovan Popzlatanov (from (North Macedonia) Vardar)
—	MF	CZE	Petr Mareš (from (Czech Republic) Mladá Boleslav)
—	MF	MKD	Darko Micevski (from (North Macedonia) Vardar)
—	MF	JPN	Yuki Ogaki (from (Japan) Nagoya Grampus)
—	FW	LVA	Marko Regža (loan return from Daugavpils)
—	FW	NGA	Emeka Basil (loan return from Tukums)
—	FW	BDI	Bonfils-Caleb Bimenyimana (loan return from (Slovakia) FK Pohronie)
—	FW	BRA	Emerson Deocleciano (from (Croatia) NK Lokomotiva, previously on loan)

Out: Note: Flags indicate national team as defined under FIFA eligibility rules; some limited exceptions apply. Players may hold more than one non-FIFA nationality.

No.	Pos.	Nation	Player
1	GK	LVA	Kaspars Ikstens (to Noah Jurmala)
7	FW	LVA	Ivans Lukjanovs (released)
8	MF	BLR	Mikhail Babichev (to (Estonia) Nõmme Kalju)
10	MF	LVA	Jānis Ikaunieks (to (Finland) KuPS)
19	MF	LVA	Jēkabs Lagūns (on loan to Valmiera)
26	DF	LVA	Vjačeslavs Isajevs (to Liepāja)
80	DF	CIV	Adama Doumbia (on loan to Daugavpils)
90	FW	NGA	Chinonso Offor (to (United States) Chicago Fire)
—	GK	LVA	Valentīns Raļkevičs (on loan to Daugavpils)
—	MF	LVA	Maksims Toņiševs (to Valmiera, previously on loan at Daugavpils)
—	MF	JPN	Yuki Ogaki (on loan to Daugavpils)

=== Valmiera ===
In: Note: Flags indicate national team as defined under FIFA eligibility rules; some limited exceptions apply. Players may hold more than one non-FIFA nationality.

No.	Pos.	Nation	Player
—	GK	LVA	Reinis Reinholds (from (Italy) Pisa)
—	GK	LVA	Rihards Matrevics (from (England) Hendon F.C.)
—	GK	RUS	Denis Popov (from (Russia) FC Rostov)
—	DF	RUS	Viktor Aleksandrov (on loan from (Russia) Rubin Kazan)
—	DF	RUS	Valeri Chupin (from (Russia) FC Khimki)
—	MF	LVA	Maksims Toņiševs (from RFS)
—	MF	JPN	Daisuke Yokota (from (Germany) Carl Zeiss Jena)
—	MF	LVA	Jēkabs Lagūns (on loan from RFS)
—	MF	SEN	Amadou Diouf (free agent)
—	MF	SEN	Meissa Diop (free agent)
—	MF	UKR	Ivan Zhelizko (from (Czech Republic) MFK Karviná)
—	MF	RUS	Svyatoslav Kozhedub (on loan from (Russia) Spartak Moscow)
—	FW	SEN	Ibrahima Sow (from (Senegal) AS Douanes)
—	FW	LVA	Raimonds Krollis (from Metta)
—	FW	COL	Camilo Mena (from (Colombia) Tigres)

Out: Note: Flags indicate national team as defined under FIFA eligibility rules; some limited exceptions apply. Players may hold more than one non-FIFA nationality.

No.	Pos.	Nation	Player
1	GK	UKR	Andriy Kozhukhar (released)
3	DF	LVA	Madis Miķelsons (released)
5	MF	LVA	Kristaps Liepa (on loan to (Czech Republic) MAS Táborsko)
6	DF	LVA	Krišs Kārkliņš (to Liepāja)
7	FW	LVA	Kristers Lūsiņš (on loan to Metta)
8	DF	UKR	Mykola Musolitin (to (Poland) Lechia Gdańsk)
15	MF	LVA	Dāvis Indrāns (to Ventspils)
16	DF	FRA	Julien Célestine (to (France) Rodez AF)
22	DF	NGA	Olaide Badmus (to (Lithuania) FK Riteriai)
65	GK	LVA	Rūdolfs Soloha (to (Poland) Miedź Legnica)
84	GK	LVA	Vladislavs Lazarevs (to Ventspils)
97	GK	LVA	Kristaps Zommers (released)

=== Ventspils ===
In: Note: Flags indicate national team as defined under FIFA eligibility rules; some limited exceptions apply. Players may hold more than one non-FIFA nationality.

No.	Pos.	Nation	Player
—	GK	LVA	Vladislavs Lazarevs (from Valmiera)
—	DF	SRB	Milenko Malovic (from (Bosnia and Herzegovina) Tekstilac Derventa)
—	DF	UKR	Andriy Slinkin (from (Ukraine) Chornomorets Odesa)
—	DF	GEO	Vako Bachiashvili (from (Georgia (country)) FC Telavi)
—	MF	UKR	Oleh Synytsya (from (Ukraine) Rukh Lviv)
—	MF	UKR	Yuriy Tkachuk (from (Estonia) Levadia Tallinn)
—	MF	AZE	Orkhan Gurbanli (from (Azerbaijan) Sabail FK)
—	MF	LVA	Boriss Bogdaškins (from Jelgava)
—	MF	LVA	Dāvis Indrāns (from Valmiera)
—	FW	SRB	Dragoljub Anđelković (from (Serbia) Sloga Kraljevo)
—	FW	LVA	Marks Kurtišs (from Jelgava)

Out: Note: Flags indicate national team as defined under FIFA eligibility rules; some limited exceptions apply. Players may hold more than one non-FIFA nationality.

No.	Pos.	Nation	Player
7	MF	BRA	Lucas Villela (to RFS)
14	MF	LVA	Raens Tālbergs (on loan to Metta)
19	MF	GEO	Giorgi Eristavi (to (Georgia (country)) Saburtalo Tbilisi)
20	DF	GEO	Giorgi Mchedlishvili (to (Georgia (country)) Samgurali Tskaltubo)
21	MF	LVA	Daniils Ulimbaševs (to Noah Jurmala)
26	FW	LVA	Kaspars Kokins (to Daugavpils)
28	FW	FRA	Chris Ondong Mba (released)
77	FW	RUS	Yevgeni Kozlov (to (Kazakhstan) FC Akzhayik)
88	DF	GEO	Giorgi Rekhviashvili (to (Georgia (country)) Shukura Kobuleti)
95	MF	RUS	Abdula Genaev (on loan to (Moldova) Dinamo Auto Tiraspol)
99	FW	LVA	Kaspars Svārups (to (Serbia) OFK Bačka)
—	MF	AZE	Orkhan Gurbanli (on loan to (Moldova) Dinamo Auto Tiraspol)

=== Liepāja ===
In: Note: Flags indicate national team as defined under FIFA eligibility rules; some limited exceptions apply. Players may hold more than one non-FIFA nationality.

No.	Pos.	Nation	Player
—	DF	LVA	Vjačeslavs Isajevs (from RFS)
—	DF	LVA	Krišs Kārkliņš (from Valmiera)
—	DF	BLR	Aleh Veratsila (from (Belarus) Dynamo Brest)
—	MF	BLR	Dzmitry Baha (from (Belarus) BATE Borisov)
—	MF	LVA	Daniils Hvoiņickis (from Jelgava)
—	FW	LVA	Dāvis Ikaunieks (on loan from (Czech Republic) Jablonec)
—	FW	BLR	Mikhail Gordeichuk (from (Belarus) Dynamo Brest)

Out: Note: Flags indicate national team as defined under FIFA eligibility rules; some limited exceptions apply. Players may hold more than one non-FIFA nationality.

No.	Pos.	Nation	Player
4	FW	BLR	Valery Gorbachik (loan return to (Belarus) Torpedo-BelAZ Zhodino)
5	MF	ARG	Leandro Teijo (released)
6	MF	GHA	Seidu Yahaya (released)
7	MF	NGA	Abdullahi Alfa (to (Estonia) Tallinna Kalev)
13	DF	LVA	Raivis Jurkovskis (to (Republic of Ireland) Dundalk)
17	MF	NGA	Dele Israel (on loan to Daugavpils)
19	MF	LVA	Kristers Čudars (to Metta)
26	DF	LVA	Deniss Ivanovs (retired)
31	GK	LVA	Valentīns Raļkevičs (to RFS)
35	DF	LVA	Roberts Zelmanis (to (Lithuania) DFK Dainava)
77	MF	NGA	Richard Friday (to Spartaks)
—	DF	BRA	Gerson (to (Japan) Kagoshima United)

=== Spartaks ===
In: Note: Flags indicate national team as defined under FIFA eligibility rules; some limited exceptions apply. Players may hold more than one non-FIFA nationality.

No.	Pos.	Nation	Player
—	DF	LVA	Ingus Šlampe (from Jelgava)
—	DF	LVA	Ivo Minkevičs (from Jelgava)
—	DF	ITA	Leonardo Rivoira (on loan from (Switzerland) Lugano)
—	MF	NGA	Richard Friday (from Liepāja)
—	MF	LVA	Vladislavs Soloveičiks (from Jelgava)
—	MF	LVA	Markuss Kruglaužs (from Jelgava)
—	MF	NGA	Israel Luiz Igbineweka (from (Nigeria) Wheelers FC)
—	MF	FIN	Adam Markhiev (from (Finland) Klubi 04)
—	MF	LVA	Deniss Meļņiks (from (Italy) Torino F.C.)
—	MF	NGA	Abiodun Ogunniyi (from (Nigeria) Sunshine Stars)
—	FW	NGA	Okosi Edhere (from (Nigeria) Ambassador Football Academy)
—	FW	NGA	Sunday Akinbule (from (Saudi Arabia) Al-Washm FC)
—	FW	CIV	Mikhael Yambe (from (Ivory Coast) Technicko FC)
—	FW	ALG	Heythem Kerbache (from (France) Troyes AC)

Out: Note: Flags indicate national team as defined under FIFA eligibility rules; some limited exceptions apply. Players may hold more than one non-FIFA nationality.

No.	Pos.	Nation	Player
2	DF	LVA	Klāvs Kramēns (on loan to Noah Jurmala)
4	DF	LTU	Edgaras Žarskis (to (Poland) Puszcza Niepołomice)
6	DF	UAE	Abdulrahim Ahli (on loan to Noah Jurmala)
7	FW	NCA	Ariagner Smith (on loan to (Belarus) Sputnik Rechitsa)
9	FW	PAN	Newton Williams (loan return to (Panama) Costa del Este)
10	MF	RUS	Sergei Eremenko (on loan to (Russia) FC Orenburg)
11	FW	NGA	Miracle Nwaorisa (on loan to Noah Jurmala)
13	DF	NGA	Lucky Opara (on loan to (Switzerland) Lugano)
16	DF	LVA	Nauris Bulvītis (released)
19	FW	KAZ	Samat Sarsenov (released)
20	FW	CRO	Leon Šipoš (on loan to (Croatia) Istra 1961)
23	MF	UKR	Kyrylo Dryshlyuk (loan return to (Ukraine) FC Oleksandriya)
25	FW	LVA	Eduards Višņakovs (loan return to (Belarus) Shakhtyor Soligorsk)
27	MF	LVA	Romāns Mickevičs (to (Poland) KKS Kalisz)
—	GK	LVA	Vladislavs Kapustins (to (Italy) Rotonda, previously on loan at Tukums)
—	DF	LVA	Jānis Krautmanis (on loan to (Lithuania) FK Nevėžis, previously on loan at Tukums)
—	MF	NGA	Aliyu Yau Adam (on loan to (Moldova) Sfântul Gheorghe)
—	MF	NGA	Pam Samuel (on loan to Noah Jurmala, previously on loan at Tukums)
—	FW	CAN	Richie Ennin (on loan to (Russia) Tom Tomsk, previously on loan at (Lithuania) FK Žalgiris)
—	FW	CIV	Mikhael Yambe (on loan to (Belarus) Sputnik Rechitsa)
—	FW	NGA	Sunday Akinbule (on loan to (Belarus) Shakhtyor Soligorsk)

=== Jelgava* ===
In: Note: Flags indicate national team as defined under FIFA eligibility rules; some limited exceptions apply. Players may hold more than one non-FIFA nationality.

No.	Pos.	Nation	Player

Out: Note: Flags indicate national team as defined under FIFA eligibility rules; some limited exceptions apply. Players may hold more than one non-FIFA nationality.

No.	Pos.	Nation	Player
4	DF	LVA	Ingus Šlampe (to Spartaks)
5	DF	LVA	Ivo Minkevičs (to Spartaks)
6	DF	LVA	Vladislavs Gabovs (retired)
8	MF	LVA	Boriss Bogdaškins (to Ventspils)
9	FW	LVA	Marks Kurtišs (to Ventspils)
21	MF	LVA	Jānis Grīnbergs (to Metta)
23	MF	LVA	Daniils Hvoiņickis (to Liepāja)
27	MF	LVA	Markuss Kruglaužs (to Spartaks)
80	MF	LVA	Jevgēņijs Kazačoks (to (Serbia) OFK Bačka)
81	MF	LVA	Vladislavs Soloveičiks (to Spartaks)
97	MF	LVA	Aleksejs Grjaznovs (to Noah Jurmala)

=== Daugavpils ===
In: Note: Flags indicate national team as defined under FIFA eligibility rules; some limited exceptions apply. Players may hold more than one non-FIFA nationality.

No.	Pos.	Nation	Player
—	GK	LVA	Frenks Orols (on loan from Riga FC)
—	GK	LVA	Valentīns Raļkevičs (on loan from RFS)
—	DF	CIV	Adama Doumbia (on loan from RFS)
—	MF	LVA	Raivis Ķiršs (on loan from Riga FC)
—	MF	JPN	Yuki Ogaki (on loan from RFS)
—	MF	NGA	Dele Israel (on loan from Liepāja)
—	MF	GHA	Isaac Nortey (from (Denmark) Næstved BK)
—	FW	LVA	Kaspars Kokins (from Ventspils)
—	FW	LVA	Ričards Žaldovskis (from Metta, previously on loan)

Out: Note: Flags indicate national team as defined under FIFA eligibility rules; some limited exceptions apply. Players may hold more than one non-FIFA nationality.

No.	Pos.	Nation	Player
6	MF	JPN	Tatsuro Nagamatsu (released)
11	FW	RUS	Kirill Makeyev (loan return to (Russia) Zenit Saint Petersburg)
14	MF	JPN	Ryonosuke Ohori (released)
15	MF	LVA	Raivis Ķiršs (to Riga FC)
16	MF	LVA	Roberts Magrins (released)
17	MF	UKR	Stanislav Nechyporenko (to (Ukraine) MFC Mykolaiv)
18	FW	LVA	Marko Regža (loan return to RFS)
20	MF	LVA	Ņikita Dobratuļins (released)
23	MF	LVA	Maksims Toņiševs (loan return to RFS)
29	MF	JPN	Ryuya Maeda (released)

=== Metta ===
In: Note: Flags indicate national team as defined under FIFA eligibility rules; some limited exceptions apply. Players may hold more than one non-FIFA nationality.

No.	Pos.	Nation	Player
—	GK	LVA	Alvis Sorokins (loan return from Saldus SS/Leevon)
—	DF	LVA	Dāvis Strods (from Tukums)
—	MF	LVA	Raens Tālbergs (on loan from Ventspils)
—	MF	LVA	Kristers Čudars (from Liepāja)
—	MF	LVA	Jānis Grīnbergs (from Jelgava)
—	MF	LVA	Dmitrijs Zelenkovs (from (Italy) Empoli F.C.)
—	FW	JPN	Ikuto Gomi (from (Japan) Vissel Kobe)
—	FW	LVA	Kristers Lūsiņš (on loan from Valmiera)
—	FW	NGA	Yunusa Owolabi Muritala (from (Belgium) K.V.C. Westerlo)

Out: Note: Flags indicate national team as defined under FIFA eligibility rules; some limited exceptions apply. Players may hold more than one non-FIFA nationality.

No.	Pos.	Nation	Player
4	DF	BRA	Franklin (to (Lithuania) FK Panevėžys)
9	FW	LVA	Raimonds Krollis (to Valmiera)
10	MF	NOR	Alban Kadriu (released)
11	FW	RSA	Kgotso Masangane (to (Sweden) Oskarshamns AIK)
13	DF	LVA	Krists Gulbis (to (Finland) FF Jaro)
14	FW	SWE	Sylvin Kayembe (released)
15	DF	LVA	Rendijs Šibass (to Noah Jurmala)
18	FW	LVA	Matīss Zēģele (to JDFS Alberts)
20	MF	CAN	Benson Fazili (released)
23	MF	LVA	Aleksejs Krujukovičs (released)
—	FW	LVA	Ričards Žaldovskis (to Daugavpils, previously on loan)

=== Noah Jurmala** ===
In: Note: Flags indicate national team as defined under FIFA eligibility rules; some limited exceptions apply. Players may hold more than one non-FIFA nationality.

No.	Pos.	Nation	Player
—	GK	LVA	Kaspars Ikstens (from RFS)
—	DF	LVA	Klāvs Kramēns (on loan from Spartaks)
—	DF	UAE	Abdulrahim Ahli (on loan from Spartaks)
—	DF	LVA	Rendijs Šibass (from Metta)
—	MF	LVA	Aleksejs Grjaznovs (from Jelgava)
—	MF	LVA	Daniils Ulimbaševs (from Ventspils)
—	MF	NGA	Pam Samuel (on loan from Spartaks)
—	FW	NGA	Miracle Nwaorisa (on loan from Spartaks)

Out: Note: Flags indicate national team as defined under FIFA eligibility rules; some limited exceptions apply. Players may hold more than one non-FIFA nationality.

No.	Pos.	Nation	Player
5	MF	BLR	Dmitry German (to (Russia) FC Tambov)
9	FW	LVA	Artis Jaudzems (to (Lithuania) FK Atmosfera)
11	MF	RUS	Aleksandr Yerkin (to (Russia) FC Tambov)
—	DF	LVA	Rendijs Šibass (to (Sweden) Dalkurd FF)

* FK Jelgava failed to obtain the necessary license for participation in the 2021 Latvian Higher League.

** Prior to the change of ownership and relocation of the club, FC Noah Jurmala were known as FC Lokomotiv Daugavpils, promoted to the 2021 Latvian Higher League as winners of the 2020 Latvian First League. FC Noah Jurmala had its license for participation in the 2021 Latvian Higher League revoked on 12 March, 2021 due to outstanding financial liabilities.
