= Jorge Reixa =

Guinean-Bissau footballer

Jorge Correia Reixa
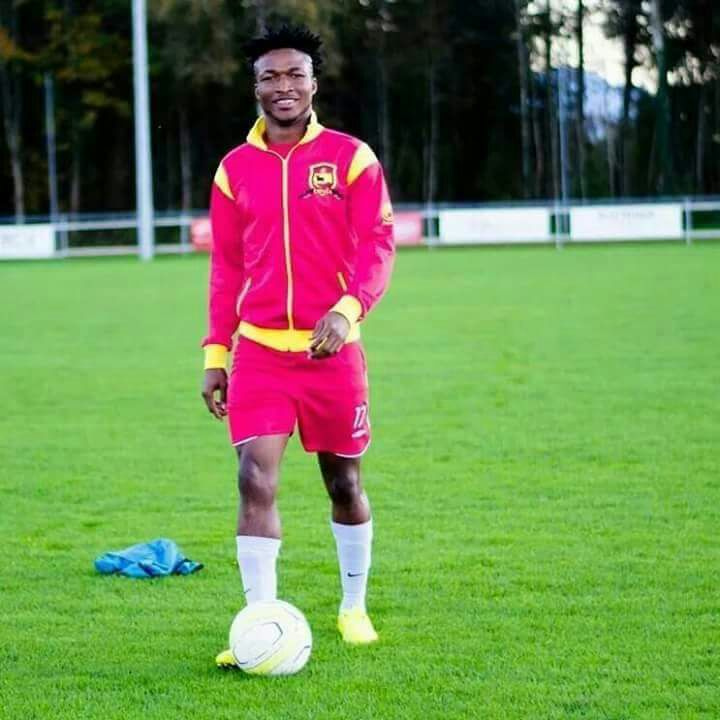

Personal information
- Full name: Jorge Correia Reixa
- Date of birth: 18 August 1993 (age 33)
- Place of birth: Bissau, Guinea-Bissau
- Height: 1.79 m (5 ft 10 1/2 in)
- Position: Forward

Team information
- Current team: FK Priekuli
- Number: 9

Youth career
- 2002–2006: Stafford Academy
- 2007–2008: Clapton

Senior career*
Years	Team	Apps	(Gls)
2009–2010	Grays Athletic	12	(4)
2011–2012	Boreham Wood FC	16	(4)
2013–2014	FC Le Mont	13	(16)
2015	Zawisza Bydgoszcz	13	(7)
2015–	Zyrardowianka	8	(2)
2018	Thonon Evian Grand Genève FC	2	(2)

International career^{‡}
2010	Portugal U-21	2	(0)
2014	Portugal U-23	1	(0)
- * Club domestic league appearances and goals as of 10:42,4 April 2017 (UTC) ‡ National team caps and goals as of 5 January 2014

Jorge Correia Reixa (born 18 August 1993) was a forward who played as a striker for Latvian club FK Priekuli. He previously played for Zawisza Bydgoszcz in the I liga (Poland)|I liga. Born in Guinea Bissau, he was a youth international for Portugal.

== Career ==
Reixa started playing football in England for Stafford U13 Academy FC before he joined English youth side Clapton, making his senior league and youth FA Cup debut. He developed there as a boy, then left for Grays Athletic. Jorge Correia Reixa later joined Boreham Wood 3rd division league and the Swiss club Le Mont, where he played for the first team in the Swiss Challenge League. He was later signed by Zawisza Bydgoszcz in the Polish first division, who loaned him to Zyrardowianka Zyrardow for the 2015-16 season. In 2018 Reixa played for Thonon Evian Grand Genève FC, a French club that currently plays in N2 French 3rd division. He then played for a club based in Thonon-les-Bains France for 2018-2019 season Thonon Evian Grand Genève FC won the National N3 in the 2019 season with Jorge Correia Reixa in 2020. He signed for FK Priekuli a Latvian 2nd division club as a Player and club Manager.

== Personal life ==
Reixa was born in Guinea-Bissau to Pedro Miquel Correia Reixa from Guinea-Bissau and Ana Maria Mendes from Guinea-Bissau. Both of his parents are Portuguese citizens. He has three brothers and two sisters.
