= Bojan Knežević =

Bojan Knežević may refer to:

- Bojan Knežević (Serbian footballer) (born 1989), Serbian football goalkeeper
- Bojan Knežević (Croatian footballer) (born 1997), Croatian football forward
