= 2021 Latvian Higher League =

Latvian Higher League
- Season: 2021
- Dates: 13 March – 6 November
- Champions: RFS
- Champions League: RFS
- Conference League: Valmiera, Liepāja, Riga
- Matches: 109
- Goals: 335 (3.07 per match)
- Top goalscorer: Stefan Milošević (13 goals)
- Biggest home win: Riga 6–1 Spartaks Jūrmala (3 April 2021); RFS 5–0 Noah Jurmala (21 June 2021)
- Biggest away win: Noah Jurmala 0–7 Riga (20 May 2021)
- Highest scoring: Riga 6–1 Spartaks Jūrmala (3 April 2021); Ventspils 5–2 Metta/LU (1 May 2021); Noah Jurmala 0–7 Riga (20 May 2021); Spartaks Jūrmala 5–2 Noah Jurmala (17 June 2021)
- Longest winning run: 10 matches RFS
- Longest unbeaten run: 14 matches RFS
- Longest winless run: 8 matches Metta/LU; Noah Jurmala
- Longest losing run: 7 matches Noah Jurmala
- All statistics correct as of 6 November 2021.

The 2021 Latvian Higher League, known as the Optibet Virslīga for sponsorship reasons, is the 30th season of top-tier football in Latvia. The season began on 13 March 2021 and ended 6 November 2021. RFS are the league champions and earned a place in the 2022–23 UEFA Champions League while the second, third and fourth-placed clubs earned a place in the 2022–23 UEFA Europa Conference League.

Riga were the defending champions after winning the league for a third consecutive season.

== Teams ==
The league consists of 8 clubs from the previous season, joined by Noah Jurmala as champions of the 2020 Latvian First League. Tukums (relegated after one year in the top flight) were relegated after finishing last in the previous season and declined to apply for a license. Meanwhile, Jelgava did not receive a licence and will not take part in this year's tournament.

On 19 June 2021, Ventspils withdrew from the remainder of the season and was dissolved later on.

On 23 July 2021, Noah Jurmala withdrew from the league, remaining matches were 3–0 forfeits.

== League table ==
Pos	Team	Pld	W	D	L	GF	GA	GD	Pts	Qualification or relegation
1	RFS (C)	28	20	6	2	65	22	+43	66	Qualification for the Champions League first qualifying round
2	Valmiera	28	19	5	4	54	19	+35	62	Qualification for the Europa Conference League second qualifying round
3	Liepāja	28	16	3	9	47	26	+21	51	Qualification for the Europa Conference League first qualifying round
4	Riga	28	14	8	6	54	26	+28	50	Qualification for the Europa Conference League first qualifying round
5	Spartaks Jūrmala	28	11	2	15	40	41	−1	35	
6	Daugavpils	28	9	5	14	37	53	−16	32	
7	Metta	28	5	5	18	33	55	−22	20	
8	Noah Jurmala (R, D)	28	1	0	27	8	96	−88	3	Withdrew from league
9	Ventspils (D, R)	0	0	0	0	0	0	0	0	Withdrew from league

Source: Soccerway
Rules for classification: 1) Points; 2) Head-to-head points; 3) Head-to-head goal difference; 4) Goal difference; 5) Goals scored; 6) Fair-play ranking; 7) Play-off.
(C) Champions; (D) Disqualified; (R) Relegated

== Fixtures and results ==
=== Rounds 1–18 ===
Rounds 1–18
Home \ Away	DAU	LIE	MLU	NOA	RIG	RFS	SPJ	VAL	VEN
Daugavpils		0–1	3–2	1–2	1–1	0–3	2–1	1–2	
Liepāja	0–0		4–1	3–0	0–2	1–2	1–2	1–2	
Metta/LU	0–1	0–3		7–0	1–1	3–3	2–0	1–1	
Noah Jurmala	1–4	0–5	0–3		0–7	0–3	0–5	0–3	
Riga	4–0	4–1	3–0	1–0		0–3	6–1	1–0	
RFS	2–1	4–0	3–0	4–2	3–1		1–0	2–3	
Spartaks Jūrmala	2–0	1–2	1–0	5–2	2–3	0–1		1–0	
Valmiera	2–2	1–0	2–0	2–0	2–1	0–1	2–0		
Ventspils									

Source: soccerway
Legend: Blue = home team win; Yellow = draw; Red = away team win.

=== Rounds 19–36 ===
Rounds 19–36
Home \ Away	DAU	LIE	MLU	NOA	RIG	RFS	SPJ	VAL	VEN
Daugavpils		1–1	3–1	3–0	3–0	0–2	3–0	1–5	
Liepāja	3–1		2–0	3–0	1–0	1–1	3–0	2–1	
Metta/LU	2–2	0–3		3–0	0–1	2–5	0–3	0–4	
Noah Jurmala	0–3	0–3	0–3		0–3	0–3	0–3	0–3	
Riga	7–1	0–1	1–1	2–1		1–1	2–1	0–0	
RFS	2–0	2–1	4–1	5–0	0–0		1–1	1–2	
Spartaks Jūrmala	3–0	0–1	1–0	3–0	1–1	1–2		1–4	
Valmiera	4–0	1–0	1–0	3–0	1–1	1–1	2–1		
Ventspils									

Source: soccerway
Legend: Blue = home team win; Yellow = draw; Red = away team win.

== Statistics ==
=== Top goalscorers ===
As of 24 August 2021

Rank	Player	Club	Goals
1	(Montenegro) Stefan Milošević	Riga	13
2	(Senegal) Ibrahima Sow	Valmiera	10
3	(Nigeria) Yunusa Muritala	Metta/LU; Riga	9
3	(Cameroon) Leonel Wamba	Spartaks Jūrmala	9
5	(Latvia) Raimonds Krollis	Valmiera	8
6	(Finland) Mikael Soisalo	Riga	7
7	(Nigeria) Richard Friday	Spartaks Jūrmala	6
7	(Latvia) Lūkass Vapne	Metta/LU	6
9	(Latvia) Marks Kurtišs	Ventspils	5
9	(Serbia) Darko Lemajić	RFS	5
9	(Brazil) Dodô	Liepāja	5
9	(Senegal) Djibril Guèye	Valmiera	5
9	(Slovenia) Žiga Lipušček	RFS	5
9	(Latvia) Raivis Ķiršs	Daugavpils	5
9	(Croatia) Tomislav Šarić	RFS	5
