= Abdulrahim Ahli =

Emirati footballer (born 1994)

Personal information
- Full name: Abdulrahim Abdulrahman Abdulrahim Mukim Ahli
- Date of birth: 24 October 1994 (age 32)
- Place of birth: United Arab Emirates
- Height: 1.76 m (5 ft 9 in)
- Position: Right back

Team information
- Current team: Al Dhaid
- Number: 24

Youth career
- Al-Ahli

Senior career*
| Years | Team | Apps | (Gls) |
| 2013–2015 | Al-Ahli | 0 | (0) |
| 2015–2019 | Al-Wahda | 2 | (0) |
| 2017–2019 | → Dibba Al-Fujairah (loan) | 15 | (0) |
| 2020–2021 | Spartaks Jurmala | 8 | (0) |
| 2021 | → Noah Jurmala (loan) | 0 | (0) |
| 2022–2023 | Al-Arabi | | |
| 2023– | Al Dhaid | | |
- * Club domestic league appearances and goals

Abdulrahim Abdulrahman Ahli (Arabic: عبد الرحيم عبد الرحمن عبد الرحيم مقيم الأهلي; born 24 October 1994) is an Emirati footballer who plays for Al Dhaid as a right back.

== Early life ==
Ahli started his career with Emirati side Al Wahda FC.

== Educastion ==
Ahli attended the Institute of Management Technology, Dubai.

== Career ==
In 2020, Ahli signed for Latvian side FK Spartaks Jūrmala, where he became the first Emirati player to start a competitive game for a European side. He made eight appearances for the club and recorded one assist and received four yellow cards.

== Style of play ==
Ahli has been described as a "buccaneering right-back".

== Personal life ==
Ahli's family encouraged and supported him to be a professional footballer.
