= Kaspars Ikstens =

Latvian footballer

Personal information
- Date of birth: 5 June 1988 (age 38)
- Place of birth: Riga, Latvian SSR
- Height: 1.86 m (6 ft 1 in)
- Position: Goalkeeper

Senior career*
Years	Team	Apps	(Gls)
2007–2009	JFK Olimps	47	(0)
2010–2011	Skonto	29	(0)
2012	FC Daugava	18	(0)
2013	Víkingur	3	(0)
2013–2017	Jelgava	128	(0)
2018–2021	Rīgas Futbola Skola	62	(0)
2021	FC Noah	0	(0)

International career^{‡}
2018–2022	Latvia	2	(0)
- * Club domestic league appearances and goals as of 10:02, 9 August 2018 (UTC) ‡ National team caps and goals as of 10:02, 9 August 2018 (UTC)

Kaspars Ikstens (born 5 June 1988) is a Latvian former international footballer who plays for Rīgas Futbola Skola, as a goalkeeper.

== Career ==
Born in Riga, Ikstens has played for JFK Olimps, Skonto, FC Daugava, Víkingur, Jelgava and Rīgas Futbola Skola.

He made his international debut for Latvia in 2018.
