= Dudu Hatamoto =

Brazilian footballer (born 2003)

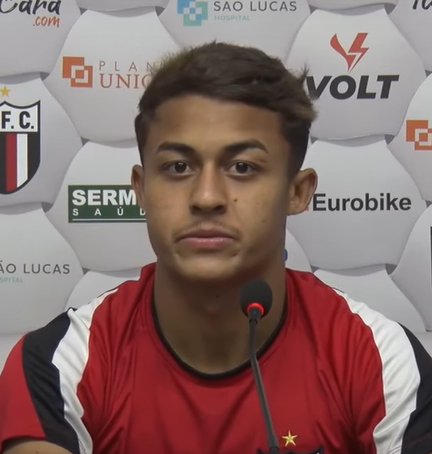
- Dudu Hatamoto in 2022

Personal information
- Full name: Eduardo Barbosa Hatamoto
- Date of birth: 6 August 2003 (age 23)
- Place of birth: Ribeirão Preto, Brazil
- Height: 1.60 m (5 ft 3 in)
- Position: Forward

Team information
- Current team: Botafogo-PB
- Number: 7

Youth career
- 2010–2013: Olé Brasil
- 2014–2017: Palmeiras
- 2018: Comercial-SP
- 2018–2020: Botafogo-SP

Senior career*
Years	Team	Apps	(Gls)
2020–2022	Botafogo-SP	41	(3)
2023	Ponte Preta	24	(1)
2023–2024	Feirense	27	(4)
2024–2025	CSKA 1948 II	10	(0)
2024–2025	CSKA 1948	8	(0)
2026–	Botafogo-PB	22	(4)
- * Club domestic league appearances and goals as of 8 November 2026

Eduardo Barbosa Hatamoto (born 6 August 2003), known as Dudu Hatamoto or just Dudu, is a Brazilian professional footballer who plays as a forward for Botafogo-PB.

== Career ==
=== Early career ===
Born in Ribeirão Preto, São Paulo, Dudu began his career at hometown side Olé Brasil at the age of seven. In 2014, aged ten, he was spotted by Palmeiras, but suffered a serious knee injury at the age of 13 which kept him sidelined for nearly a year.

After overcoming his knee injury, Dudu had to undergo surgery two further times, due to a heart condition and later due to an appendicitis. After again recovering, he asked to leave the club in 2017.

=== Botafogo-SP ===
Dudu subsequently returned to his hometown, and spent a short period at Comercial-SP before joining Botafogo-SP's under-15 category in July 2018. He made his senior debut on 5 November 2020 at the age of just 17, starting and scoring a brace in a 4–3 away win over Marília, for the year's Copa Paulista. The following day, it was announced that he had renewed his contract with the club until 2023.

Dudu made his professional debut for Bota on 20 November 2020, coming on as a second-half substitute for Rafinha in a 2–1 Série B away loss against Guarani. He scored his first professional goal the following 28 February, netting the opener in a 1–1 draw at São Paulo in the Campeonato Paulista.

In April 2021, Dudu suffered an ankle injury in a match against Ituano, which kept him sidelined for four months. Back to action in September, he was regularly used afterwards.

=== Ponte Preta ===
On 11 January 2023, Dudu was registered at Ponte Preta, being announced only three days later.

=== Feirense ===
On 27 July 2023, Liga Portugal 2 side Feirense announced the permanent signing of Dudu, handing him the number 77 shirt.

== Personal life ==
On 26 September 2022, Dudu and Botafogo-SP teammates Lucas Delgado and João Diogo were accused of sexual assault in Rio de Janeiro. Delgado was released by the club two days later, while Dudu and João Diogo were punished by Botafogo.

== Career statistics ==
As of 1 March 2023

Appearances and goals by club, season and competition
Club	Season	League			State League		Cup		Continental		Other		Total	
Club	Season	Division	Apps	Goals	Apps	Goals	Apps	Goals	Apps	Goals	Apps	Goals	Apps	Goals
Botafogo-SP	2020	Série B	6	0	0	0	—		—		5 (Note: Appearances in the Copa Paulista)	3	11	3
Botafogo-SP	2021	Série C	3	0	6	1	—		—		11	1	20	2
Botafogo-SP	2022	Série C	12	0	14	2	1	0	—		6	3	33	5
Botafogo-SP	Total		21	0	20	3	1	0	—		22	7	64	10
Ponte Preta	2023	Série B	0	0	11	1	—		—		—		11	1
Career total			21	0	31	4	1	0	0	0	22	7	75	11
