= Didine Djouhary =

French footballer (born 1999)

Personal information
- Full name: Didine Mohamed Djouhary
- Date of birth: 8 February 1999 (age 27)
- Place of birth: Le Port, Réunion, France
- Height: 1.75 m (5 ft 9 in)
- Position: Midfielder

Youth career
- 2014–2017: Nantes
- 2017–2018: Novara

Senior career*
Years	Team	Apps	(Gls)
2017–2018	Novara	0	(0)
2018	→ Caratese (loan)	11	(1)
2018–2019	Stade Poitevin	3	(0)
2019	Lyon-Duchère II	8	(2)
2020	Spartaks Jūrmala	17	(1)
2020–2021	Shakhtyor Soligorsk	0	(0)
2020	→ Gorodeya (loan)	5	(2)
2021	→ Sputnik Rechitsa (loan)	7	(0)
- * Club domestic league appearances and goals as of 31 December 2021

Didine Djouhary (born 8 February 1999) is a French professional footballer.
