= Naisir Carmona =

Colombian footballer (born 1998)

Personal information
- Full name: Naisir Carmona Muñoz
- Date of birth: 26 September 1998 (age 28)
- Place of birth: Colombia
- Position: Midfielder

Senior career*
| Years | Team | Apps | (Gls) |
| 2016–2018 | Independiente Medellín | 3 | (0) |
| 2018–2019 | BFC Daugavpils | | |
- * Club domestic league appearances and goals as of 15 July 2023

Naisir Carmona (26 September 1998) is a footballer from Colombia who plays as a striker.
