= Alexis Ossa =

Colombian footballer (born 1989)

Personal information
- Full name: Leonardo Alexis Ossa López
- Date of birth: 6 August 1989 (age 37)
- Place of birth: La Estrella, Colombia
- Height: 1.80 m (5 ft 11 in)
- Position: Midfielder

Team information
- Current team: Atlético Pantoja

Senior career*
| Years | Team | Apps | (Gls) |
| 2009–2010 | Envigado | 1 | (0) |
| 2012–2013 | Independiente Medellín | 7 | (0) |
| 2013–2014 | Jaguares de Córdoba | 24 | (6) |
| 2014–2015 | Cúcuta Deportivo | 32 | (1) |
| 2015–2016 | Atlético Bucaramanga | 15 | (4) |
| 2016 | Llaneros de Guanare | 13 | (0) |
| 2017 | Cúcuta Deportivo | 4 | (0) |
| 2019 | BFC Daugavpils | 10 | (0) |
| 2020– | Atlético Pantoja | | |
- * Club domestic league appearances and goals as of 26 October 2020

Alexis Ossa (born 6 August 1989) is a Colombian professional footballer who plays as a midfielder for Atlético Pantoja. After a lengthy career in Colombia, he ventured abroad in Venezuela, Latvia and the Dominican Republic.
