= Bojan Knežević (Serbian footballer) =

Serbian footballer

Personal information
- Full name: Bojan Knežević
- Date of birth: 13 April 1989 (age 37)
- Place of birth: Belgrade, SFR Yugoslavia
- Height: 1.92 m (6 ft 4 in)
- Position: Goalkeeper

Team information
- Current team: Srem

Youth career
- Milutinac Zemun
- Red Star Belgrade

Senior career*
Years	Team	Apps	(Gls)
2006–2009	Red Star Belgrade	0	(0)
2007	→ Radnički Nova Pazova (loan)	15	(0)
2009	→ Radnički Nova Pazova (loan)	12	(0)
2009–2010	Mladost Apatin	0	(0)
2010	→ Sopot (loan)	3	(0)
2010–2011	Sopot	21	(0)
2011	Dunav Stari Banovci	13	(0)
2012–2013	Zemun	48	(0)
2014–2015	Spartak Trnava	2	(0)
2014–2015	Spartak Trnava II	23	(0)
2016–2018	Inđija	17	(0)
2018–2019	Budućnost Dobanovci	15	(0)
2019	Kokand 1912	6	(0)
2019–2020	Železničar Pančevo		
2021	Noah Jūrmala	6	(0)
2022	BSK Batajnica		
2022	Omladinac Novi Banovci		
2023–	Srem		
- * Club domestic league appearances and goals as of 00:51, 5 June 2020 (UTC)

Bojan Knežević (born 13 April 1989) is a Serbian footballer who plays as a goalkeeper.

== Club career ==
Knežević was signed by Spartak Trnava in February 2014 and made his league debut on 1 March 2014 against Nitra.

Ahead of the 2019–20 season, Knežević joined FK Železničar Pančevo.

On 9 June 2021, the Latvian Sports Disciplinary Committee decided to disqualify three Noah Jūrmala players with Knežević being one of them, for 12 months for match fixing.
