= 2020 Latvian First League =

Komanda.lv First League
- Season: 2020

The 2020 Latvian First League (referred to as the Komanda.lv First League for sponsorship reasons) was the 29th season of second-tier football in Latvia. The season started on 4 July 2020.

On November 6, 2020, the Latvian Football Federation determined the suspension of the championship due to COVID-19, so the final positions were assigned with a coefficient marked with the results obtained up to the last week played.

== Teams ==
Locations of the 2020 Latvian First League teams

Note: Table lists in alphabetical order.

Team	Location	Stadium	Capacity
Auda	Ķekava	Audas stadions	1,000
Grobiņas	Grobiņa	Grobiņa Stadium	1,000
JDFS Alberts	Riga	Daugavgrīvas vidusskolas stadions	1,000
Lokomotiv Daugavpils	Daugavpils	Stadions Celtnieks	4,070
Rēzeknes FA/BJSS	Rēzekne	Sporta Aģentūras Stadions	978
Saldus SS/Leevon	Saldus	Saldus pilsētas stadions	2,000
Smiltene/BJSS	Smiltene	Tepera stadions	1,000
Dinamo Rīga	Riga	RTU stadions	1,000
Super Nova	Riga	Olaines stadions	2,500

== League table ==
Pos	Team	Pld	W	D	L	GF	GA	Pts	Coeff	Promotion or relegation
1	Lokomotiv Daugavpils (P)	12	10	1	1	39	10	31	2.583	Promotion to the 2021 Latvian Higher League
2	Auda	13	9	1	3	32	15	28	2.154	
3	Grobiņas	12	5	3	4	23	14	18	1.500	
4	JDFS Alberts	12	5	3	4	11	16	18	1.500	
5	Staiceles Bebri	12	5	1	6	20	12	16	1.333	
6	Super Nova	13	4	4	5	20	20	16	1.230	
7	Rēzeknes FA/BJSS	13	4	2	7	14	32	14	1.077	
8	Smiltene/BJSS	14	3	3	8	18	40	12	0.857	
9	Saldus	11	0	4	7	8	26	4	0.363	Relegation to the 2021 Latvian Second League

Updated to match(es) played on 11 October 2020. Source: Soccerway
Rules for classification: 1) Points; 2) Head-to-head points; 3) Head-to-head goal difference; 4) Goal difference; 5) Goals scored; 6) Fair-play ranking; 7) Play-off.
(P) Promoted

== Results ==
Each club will play each other twice (home and away) in the first half of the season, and then play each other once (either home or away) in the second half of the season for a total of 24 matches per team.

First half of the season
Home \ Away	AUD	GRO	JDF	LOK	RĒZ	SAL	SMI	STA	SUP
Auda			2–0		5–2				2–3
Grobiņas				2–2		5–1			
JDFS Alberts		2–1					1–0		
Lokomotiv Daugavpils	2–0								
Rēzekne FA				1–3				1–0	
Saldus			1–1	0–5					1–6
Smiltene/BJSS		2–0		1–6				2–4	
Staiceles Bebri	0–3								0–0
Super Nova					4–1		2–3		

Updated to match(es) played on 1 August 2020. Source: Soccerway
Legend: Blue = home team win; Yellow = draw; Red = away team win.

Second half of the season
Home \ Away	AUD	GRO	JDF	LOK	RĒZ	SAL	SMI	STA	SUP
Auda									
Grobiņas									
JDFS Alberts									
Lokomotiv Daugavpils									
Rēzekne FA									
Saldus									
Smiltene/BJSS									
Staiceles Bebri									
Super Nova									

Updated to match(es) played on pre-season. Source: Soccerway
Legend: Blue = home team win; Yellow = draw; Red = away team win.
