= Stylianos Panteli =

Cypriot footballer (born 1999)

Personal information
- Full name: Stylianos Panteli
- Date of birth: August 7, 1999 (age 27)
- Place of birth: Limassol, Cyprus
- Height: 1.76 m (5 ft 9 in)
- Position: Right wing-back

Team information
- Current team: Omonia 29M
- Number: 15

Senior career*
Years	Team	Apps	(Gls)
2016–2023	AEL Limassol	31	(0)
2017–2018	→ Olympiakos Nicosia (loan)	19	(1)
2019	→ Jelgava (loan)	5	(0)
2020–2021	→ Ermis Aradippou (loan)	20	(1)
2021–2022	→ Nea Salamina (loan)	20	(2)
2023–2025	Karmiotissa	47	(1)
2025–	Omonia 29M	25	(0)

International career^{‡}
2015	Cyprus U17	3	(0)
2016–2017	Cyprus U19	4	(0)
2019	Cyprus U21	4	(0)
- * Club domestic league appearances and goals as of 3 May 2026 ‡ National team caps and goals as of 10 September 2019

Stylianos Panteli (Greek: Στυλιανός Παντελή, born 7 August 1999) is a Cypriot footballer who plays as a right wing-back for Omonia 29M.

== Career ==
On 29 January 2019, Panteli was loaned out to Latvian club FK Jelgava for the rest of the season.
