= Alexandre Obambot =

Congolese footballer

Personal information
- Date of birth: 14 February 1999 (age 27)
- Place of birth: Brazzaville, Congo
- Height: 1.79 m (5 ft 10 in)
- Position: Defender

Team information
- Current team: Thonon Evian

Youth career
- 2017–2019: FC Nantes

Senior career*
Years	Team	Apps	(Gls)
2017	CARA Brazzaville		
2019	Spartaks Jūrmala	11	(0)
2019–2020	Saint-Pryvé Saint-Hilaire	7	(0)
2020–2021	Amiens SC II	4	(1)
2022–2024	Bourges Foot 18 II	18	(1)
2022–2024	Bourges Foot 18	27	(1)
2024–	Thonon Evian	9	(2)

International career
2019–2020	Congo	2	(0)
- * Club domestic league appearances and goals as of 7 December 2024

Alexandre Obambot (born 14 February 1999) is a Congolese football defender who plays for French Championnat National 3 club Thonon Evian.
