= Jeremy Fernandes =

Dutch footballer (born 1995)

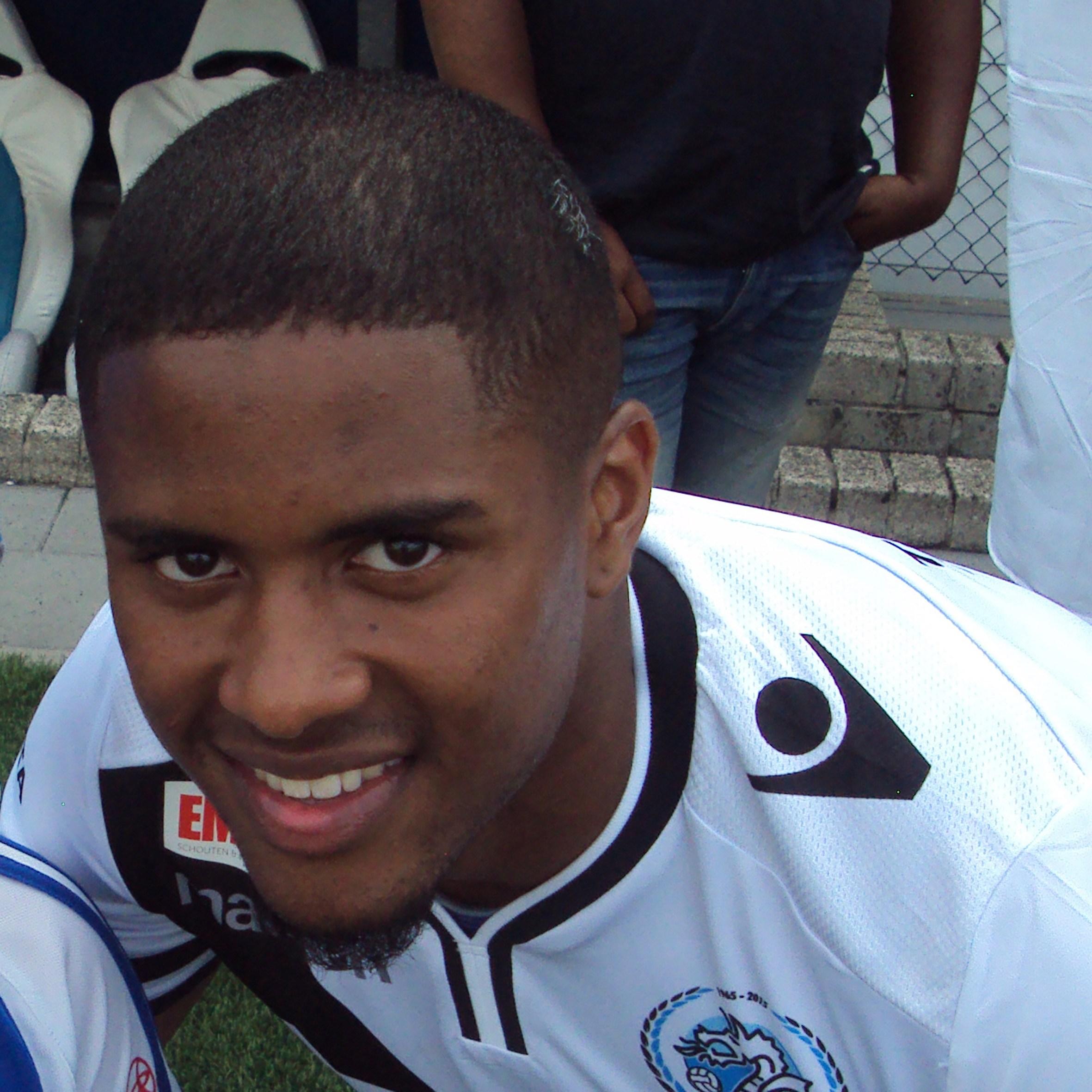

Personal information
- Date of birth: 14 August 1995 (age 31)
- Place of birth: Rotterdam, Netherlands
- Height: 1.80 m (5 ft 11 in)
- Positions: Right back; centre back

Youth career
- –2013: Dordrecht
- 2013–2014: Barendrecht
- 2014–2015: Brabant United

Senior career*
Years	Team	Apps	(Gls)
2015–2018	Den Bosch	56	(2)
2019	Jelgava	29	(0)
2021	Džiugas	32	(3)
2022	SteDoCo		
- * Club domestic league appearances and goals as of 2024

Jeremy Fernandes (born 14 August 1995) is a Dutch retired football player of Cape Verdean descent.

== Club career ==
He made his professional debut in the Eerste Divisie for FC Den Bosch on 21 August 2015 in a game against FC Emmen.

Fernandes signed for FK Jelgava in Latvia two weeks after his contract with Den Bosch was terminated.

He quit football in September 2022 to focus on a career outside the sport.
