= FK Priekuļi =

Latvian football club

- Full name: Futbola klubs "Priekuļi"
- Founded: 2004
- Ground: Cēsu Olimpiskais centrs
- Capacity: 1500
- Chairman: Andrejs Ivanovs
- Head Coach: Normunds Zvejnieks
- League: Latvian Second League (formerly)
- Website: https://www.facebook.com/FKPriekuli/
Home colours	Away colours

FK Priekuļi is a Latvian football club based in Priekuļi, Cēsis Municipality. They competed in the second-highest division of Latvian football Latvian Second League, until they withdrew in 2023. The club played its home matches at the Cēsis Olympic Center stadium with capacity of 1,500 people.

== History ==
FK Priekuļi was founded in 2004. It participated in the 2nd League Vidzeme Championship for several seasons, but in the 2013 and 2014 seasons they played in the 3rd League of the Vidzeme championship. In 2015, the club returned to the 2nd league.

The most successful season so far was 2015, when in the competition of eight teams Priekuļi won the 4th place and won the right to play in the 2nd league final tournament, running for the first league championship. In its subgroup Priekuļi remained in the second place and did not reach the final.

In 2014, a women's soccer team was formed. FK Priekuļi also has a youth football system, which is represented in eight different age groups.

As of 2026, the main activities of the club are in youth football.

== First-team squad ==
As of 14 October 2021.

Note: Flags indicate national team as defined under FIFA eligibility rules; some limited exceptions apply. Players may hold more than one non-FIFA nationality.

No.	Pos.	Nation	Player
1	GK	LVA	Vasmuss Oskars
22	GK	LVA	Plakanis Ričards
2	MF	LVA	Bitāns Dāvis
3	FW	LVA	Krieviņš Gatis
4	DF	LVA	Zernis Kārlis
5	DF	LVA	Keišs Raivis
6	MF	LVA	Zumbergs Jurģis
7	MF	LVA	Talcis Artūrs Rainers
8	MF	LVA	Talcis Artūrs Rainers
10	MF	LVA	Krieviņš Dāvis
11	MF	LVA	Rūtiņš Elvis
12	MF	LVA	Šteins Regnārs
14	MF	LVA	Aumeistars Reinis Jēkabs
15	MF	LVA	Saldūksnis Dāvis
17	MF	LVA	Grosbergs Klāvs
18	DF	LVA	Cipe Roberts Rainers (C)
21	DF	LVA	Bems Viesturs
23	MF	LVA	Lācis Edgars
—	FW	LVA	Spalviņš Māris
—	DF	LVA	Kostovs Arnolds
—	DF	LVA	Bobrovs Elvis
—	MF	LVA	Lukstiņš Pauls Rodrigo
—	MF	LVA	Muraško Ruslans
—	MF	LVA	Ekerts Rojs Roberts
—	MF	LVA	Raudziņš Martins Kristers

== Staff ==
Name, surname	Position
(Latvia) Andrejs Ivanovs	Chairman/President
(Latvia) Normunds Zvejnieks	Head coach
(Latvia) Māris Spalviņš	Assistant Coach
(Latvia) Jānis Naglis	Club Administrator
