= Lucas Delgado =

Argentine footballer (born 1995)

Personal information
- Full name: Alexis Lucas Delgado
- Date of birth: 24 March 1995 (age 31)
- Place of birth: Capitán Bermúdez, Argentina
- Height: 1.86 m (6 ft 1 in)
- Position: Centre-forward

Team information
- Current team: San Miguel

Youth career
- Boca Juniors

Senior career*
Years	Team	Apps	(Gls)
2016	Guaraní Antonio Franco	6	(0)
2016–2017	Barracas Central	10	(1)
2017–2019	Temperley	11	(2)
2019	FK Liepāja	12	(2)
2019	Nacional Potosí	7	(0)
2020–2024	Fénix	18	(7)
2021	→ Tristán Suárez (loan)	12	(1)
2022	→ Sacachispas (loan)	5	(0)
2022	→ Botafogo-SP (loan)	18	(1)
2023	→ San Telmo (loan)	2	(0)
2024–2026	Argentino de Merlo	49	(15)
2026–	San Miguel	9	(2)
- * Club domestic league appearances and goals as of 18:08, 5 May 2026 (UTC)

Alexis Lucas Delgado (born 24 March 1995) is an Argentine professional footballer who plays as a centre-forward for San Miguel.

== Career ==
Delgado started life in senior football with Guaraní Antonio Franco; signing from Boca Juniors. He featured six times in Torneo Federal A, including for his debut against Sol de América on 7 February 2016. Delgado moved to Barracas Central on 2 September. One goal, in an April draw versus Tristán Suárez, in eleven matches subsequently occurred. Primera División team Temperley signed Delgado in July 2017. His first goal for them arrived on 27 April in a win away to Chacarita Juniors, though he was later sent off in the game. He returned on 12 May for a match with Belgrano, netting in a win as they were relegated.

In March 2019, Delgado joined Latvian Higher League side FK Liepāja; terminating his Temperley contract to do so. His first goal came during his second appearance, as he netted in a victory away from home versus FK Jelgava on 5 April. A further goal, against Daugavpils, occurred across twelve games, prior to Delgado mutually ending his contract in early June; exercising a clause that was inserted back in March. Delgado then headed off to Nacional Potosí of the Bolivian Primera División. He'd make just seven appearances, of which only two were starts, before departing at the end of the year.

In September 2020, following months of inactivity after a failed move to Swedish football and the COVID-19 pandemic, Delgado returned to Argentina with Primera B Metropolitana's Fénix.

== Personal life ==
Delgado is the nephew of former Argentina international footballer Marcelo Delgado. On 26 September 2022, Delgado and Botafogo-SP teammates Dudu Hatamoto and João Diogo were accused of sexual assault in Rio de Janeiro. Delgado was released by the club two days later, while Dudu and João Diogo were punished by Botafogo.

== Career statistics ==
As of 1 October 2020

Appearances and goals by club, season and competition
Club	Season	League			National cup		League cup		Continental		Other		Total	
Club	Season	Division	Apps	Goals	Apps	Goals	Apps	Goals	Apps	Goals	Apps	Goals	Apps	Goals
Guaraní Antonio Franco	2016	Torneo Federal A	6	0	0	0	—		—		0	0	6	0
Barracas Central	2016–17	Primera B Metropolitana	10	1	0	0	—		—		1 (Note: Appearance(s) in the Primera B Metropolitana play-offs)	0	11	1
Temperley	2017–18	Argentine Primera División	6	2	0	0	—		—		0	0	6	2
Temperley	2018–19	Primera B Nacional	5	0	4	1	—		—		0	0	9	1
Temperley	Total		11	2	4	1	—		—		0	0	15	3
FK Liepāja	2019	Higher League	12	2	0	0	—		0	0	0	0	12	2
Nacional Potosí	2019	Bolivian Primera División	7	0	—		—		0	0	0	0	7	0
Fénix	2020–21	Primera B Metropolitana	0	0	0	0	—		—		0	0	0	0
Career total			46	5	4	1	—		0	0	1	0	51	6
