= Bohdan Kovalenko =

Ukrainian footballer

Personal information
- Full name: Bohdan Ruslanovych Kovalenko
- Date of birth: 24 April 1997 (age 29)
- Place of birth: Kyiv, Ukraine
- Height: 1.68 m (5 ft 6 in)
- Position: Forward

Team information
- Current team: Pirin Blagoevgrad
- Number: 11

Youth career
- 2009–2012: Arsenal Kyiv
- 2012–2014: Shakhtar Donetsk

Senior career*
Years	Team	Apps	(Gls)
2014–2016	Shakhtar Donetsk	0	(0)
2015	→ Shakhtar-3 Donetsk	6	(0)
2017	Chaika Kyiv-Sviatoshyn Raion	8	(0)
2017	Pafos	11	(0)
2018	Riga	8	(0)
2019	Daugavpils	10	(0)
2019	Chornomorets Odesa	12	(0)
2019	→ Chornomorets-2 Odesa	1	(0)
2020	Cherkashchyna	0	(0)
2020	Veles Moscow	6	(0)
2021	LNZ Cherkasy	5	(0)
2021–2022	Mynai	12	(0)
2023	ASKÖ Oedt	2	(0)
2023–2024	Colunga	30	(3)
2024–	Pirin Blagoevgrad	8	(0)

International career^{‡}
2013	Ukraine U16	3	(0)
- * Club domestic league appearances and goals as of 1 March 2025 ‡ National team caps and goals as of 18 October 2021

Bohdan Ruslanovych Kovalenko (Ukrainian: Богдан Русланович Коваленко; born 24 April 1997) is a Ukrainian professional football striker who plays for Pirin Blagoevgrad.

== Career ==
Bohdan is a product of the youth team systems of FC Arsenal Kyiv and FC Shakhtar Donetsk.

After playing in the Ukrainian Premier League Reserves, the Ukrainian Second League and the Ukrainian Amateurs, he was signed by Pafos FC, a team from Cyprus.

== Honours ==
Riga

- Latvian Higher League: 2018
- Latvian Cup: 2018

Chaika Kyiv-Sviatoshyn Raion

- Ukrainian Football Amateur League: 2017–18
