= Richard Friday =

Nigerian footballer

Personal information
- Full name: Richard Emeka Friday
- Date of birth: 16 February 2000 (age 26)
- Place of birth: Abuja, Nigeria
- Height: 1.83 m (6 ft 0 in)
- Position: Winger

Team information
- Current team: Surkhon
- Number: 11

Senior career*
Years	Team	Apps	(Gls)
2019–2020	Liepāja	47	(12)
2021–2022	Spartaks Jūrmala	16	(6)
2021–2022	→ Örebro (loan)	9	(0)
2022–2024	GAIS	42	(8)
2025	Dinamo Samarqand	28	(2)
2026–	Surkhon	14	(1)
- * Club domestic league appearances and goals as of 29 July 2026

Richard Emeka Friday (born 16 February 2000) is a Nigerian footballer who plays for Surkhon in the Uzbekistan Super League.

== Club career ==
On 12 March 2022, Friday signed with GAIS.
