= Tin Vukmanić =

Croatian footballer

Personal information
- Date of birth: 17 April 1999 (age 27)
- Place of birth: Karlovac, Croatia
- Height: 1.80 m (5 ft 11 in)
- Position: Midfielder

Team information
- Current team: SVH Waldbach

Youth career
- 2014–2017: Dinamo Zagreb

Senior career*
Years	Team	Apps	(Gls)
2017	Dinamo Zagreb II	0	(0)
2017–2018	Inter Zaprešić	10	(0)
2018	Virtus Francavilla	8	(0)
2019–2020	Spartaks Jūrmala	17	(5)
2019	→ RFS (loan)	6	(0)
2020	→ Shakhtyor Soligorsk (loan)	10	(0)
2021	Shakhtyor Soligorsk	1	(0)
2021	→ Sputnik Rechitsa (loan)	11	(0)
2022	Spartaks Jūrmala	3	(0)
2022	Rudeš	4	(0)
2023	Nocerina	10	(0)
2023–	SVH Waldbach		
- * Club domestic league appearances and goals as of 14 May 2023

Tin Vukmanić (born 17 April 1999) is a Croatian professional footballer who plays for SVH Waldbach.
