= Prince Agyemang =

Ghanaian footballer

Personal information
- Date of birth: 25 December 1994 (age 31)
- Place of birth: Kumasi, Ghana
- Height: 1.75 m (5 ft 9 in)
- Position: Midfielder

Team information
- Current team: Valmieras
- Number: 66

Youth career
- 2008–2013: Red Bull Ghana
- 2013–2014: Right to Dream

Senior career*
| Years | Team | Apps | (Gls) |
| 2014 | Limerick | 25 | (0) |
| 2015 | Right to Dream | | |
| 2015 | Limerick | 6 | (0) |
| 2016 | New Edubiase United | 6 | (1) |
| 2016–2017 | Sporting Covilhã | 19 | (0) |
| 2017–2018 | Ontinyent | | |
| 2018 | Richmond Kickers | 9 | (1) |
| 2019 | FK Liepāja | 2 | (0) |
| 2019– | Valmieras | 6 | (0) |
- * Club domestic league appearances and goals as of 18:13, 22 September 2019 (UTC)

Prince Agyemang (born 25 December 1994) is a Ghanaian footballer who plays for Latvian club Valmieras FK as a midfielder.

== Club career ==
Born in Kumasi, Agyemang played for Red Bull Ghana and Right to Dream Academy before moving to League of Ireland Premier Division side Limerick on 8 March 2014. He made his debut for the club six days later, coming on as a late substitute in a 2–1 away loss against Dundalk.

Agyemang featured regularly for the side before returning to Right to Dream in 2015. Late in the year he re-joined Limerick, but appeared rarely.

Agyemang made his professional debut in the Ghana Premier League for New Edubiase United on 23 April 2016 in a game against Asante Kotoko. On 1 July, he moved to Portugal after agreeing to a contract with S.C. Covilhã in Segunda Liga.

On 23 August 2017, Agyemang signed for Spanish Segunda División B club Ontinyent CF.
