= Real Sapphire F.C. =

Nigerian football club

Real Sapphire Football Club commonly referred to as Real Sapphire FC, is a Nigerian professional football club based in Lagos, Nigeria. The club competes in third tier of the Nigeria League Nationwide League One, the Creative Championship (TCC) and the Federation Cup and is recognized for its strong focus on youth development and grassroots football. Since its founding, Real Sapphire FC has steadily grown in reputation, producing talented players who have gone on to play at higher levels both domestically and internationally.

== History ==
Real Sapphire Football Club was established in 2015 with the vision of developing young football talent in Nigeria and creating pathways for players to pursue professional careers. From its early years, Real Sapphire FC invested heavily in qualified coaching staff, and structured player development programs. This holistic approach quickly positioned the club as one of the leading privately owned football academies and clubs in Nigeria.

== Three-tier system ==
- De Project - The entry stage for young players, where the coaching team focuses on fundamental technical training, discipline, teamwork, and instilling a strong footballing mindset. It is designed to transform raw potential into future greatness.
- De Elite – The bridge between youth and senior football, made up of promising players under 16. De-Elite competes in the Nationwide Youth League (NLO 2), Nigeria's fourth tier, and is regarded as the breeding ground for future stars who later progress to the senior squad.
- Senior Team – Real Sapphire FC's first team competes in the Nationwide League One (NLO One), the Creative Championship (TCC), and The Federation Cup.

== Club philosophy and development ==
Real Sapphire FC emphasizes technical ability, tactical intelligence, and character development. The club operates both as a competitive football team and as an academy, providing education, mentorship, and life skills alongside football training.

The club's philosophy is built on:

- Developing players from grassroots into professionals.
- Promoting discipline, teamwork, and resilience.
- Creating opportunities for international exposure through tournaments and partnerships.

== Achievements ==
- The Nigeria Federation Cup Semi finalist 2018
- (TCC) 2024/2025 Season
- Champion of the first edition of TCC- Elite Cup 2024/2025 Season.
- Promotional Play off of the Nigeria Nationwide League One 2024/2025 Season
- Produced notable players, including Victor Boniface, who began his career at Real Sapphire FC, The Nigeria national under-20 football team before moving on to European football and gaining international recognition.- Nnamdi Chinonso Offor, Tosin Aiyegun, Ademo Peter Oluwaseun, Abdulrasaq Adeshina Adetunji to name but few and other players.
- Consistently recognized in local and regional youth tournaments for outstanding performance.
- National Team Representation: Consistently supplies players to Nigeria national under-17 football team and Nigeria national under-20 football team Nigeria Super Eagles {the senior national team}.
- 2023 Africa U-17 Cup of Nations: Israel Nwachukwu Usulor and Musa Akinfenwa represented Nigeria's Golden Eaglets in Algeria.
- 2023 Africa U-20 Cup of Nations & FIFA U-20 World Cup: Jude Sunday played for Nigeria national under-20 football team in Egypt and Argentina.
- 2024 WAFU U-20 WAFU U-20 Championship B Championship (Togo): Musa Oluwaseyi|Real Sapphire's and Bidemi Olalekan featured in all matches, contributing to Nigeria's Flying Eagles defeating Ghana’s Black Satellites 2–1 in the final to retain the title.
- Grassroots Impact: Runs a structured three-tier player development program (De Project, De-Elite, Real Sapphire FC -Senior Team) that nurtures raw talent into professional footballers.

== Notable players ==
Several players have progressed from Real Sapphire FC to professional football at higher levels.

- Victor Boniface – Forward, currently playing for SV Werder Bremen in Bundesliga.
- Chinonso Offor – Forward, FC Baltika Kaliningrad Russia.
- Idowu David Akintola – Midfielder, FC Arda Kardzhali (Bulgaria).
- Tosin Aiyegun – Forward, FC Lorient (France), Benin national football team.
- Peter Oluwaseyi Ademo – Defender, FC Sheriff Tiraspol (Moldova).
- Ejika Julius Opara – Striker - FK Novi Pazar (Serbia).
- Ibrahim Yusuf Omosanya -Midfielder FK Radnicki 1923 (Serbia)
- Thomas Victor Ude – Defender FK Radnicki 1923 (Serbia)
- Adetunji Rasaq Adeshina – Midfielder, Linzer Athletik Sport Klub-LASK (Austria).
- Israel Usulor – Represented Nigerian National Under 17 football team at the 2023 AFCON (Algeria).
- Ibrahim Olaosebikan Abiodun - Midfielder - FK Vardar
- Darlington Nwosu Chibuike- Midfielder – Tauras Taurage -Lithuania
- Jude Sunday – Winger, SK Dynamo České Budějovice (Czech Republic) represented Nigeria U-20 Nigeria national under-20 football teamat the 2023 Africa Cup of Nations (Egypt) and FIFA U-20 World Cup (Argentina).
- Ayodele Olawale Oluwafemi – ZTE FC Hungary.

== Management and structure ==
The club is overseen by a club president supported by a sports director, technical team, and administrative staff. Coaches are responsible for player development at various age levels, while the club also maintains a scouting and recruitment department.

== International representation ==
Real Sapphire FC has consistently supplied talent to Nigeria's youth and senior national teams. In October 2024, Musa Oluwaseyi and Amole Bidemi Olalekan represented Nigeria national under-20 football team Nigeria's Flying Eagles at the WAFU U-20 Championship in Lome, Togo. Both players featured in every match of the competition, contributing significantly as Nigeria defeated Ghana's Black Satellites 2–1 in the final to defend their title. Musa played as a forward, while Bidemi controlled the midfield.

== Future plans ==
Real Sapphire FC aims to expand its academy operations, establish stronger international links for player transfers, and eventually compete at the highest levels of professional football in Nigeria and beyond. The club also envisions building a dedicated stadium and training complex to strengthen its infrastructure.
