= Ofosu Appiah =

Ghanaian footballer

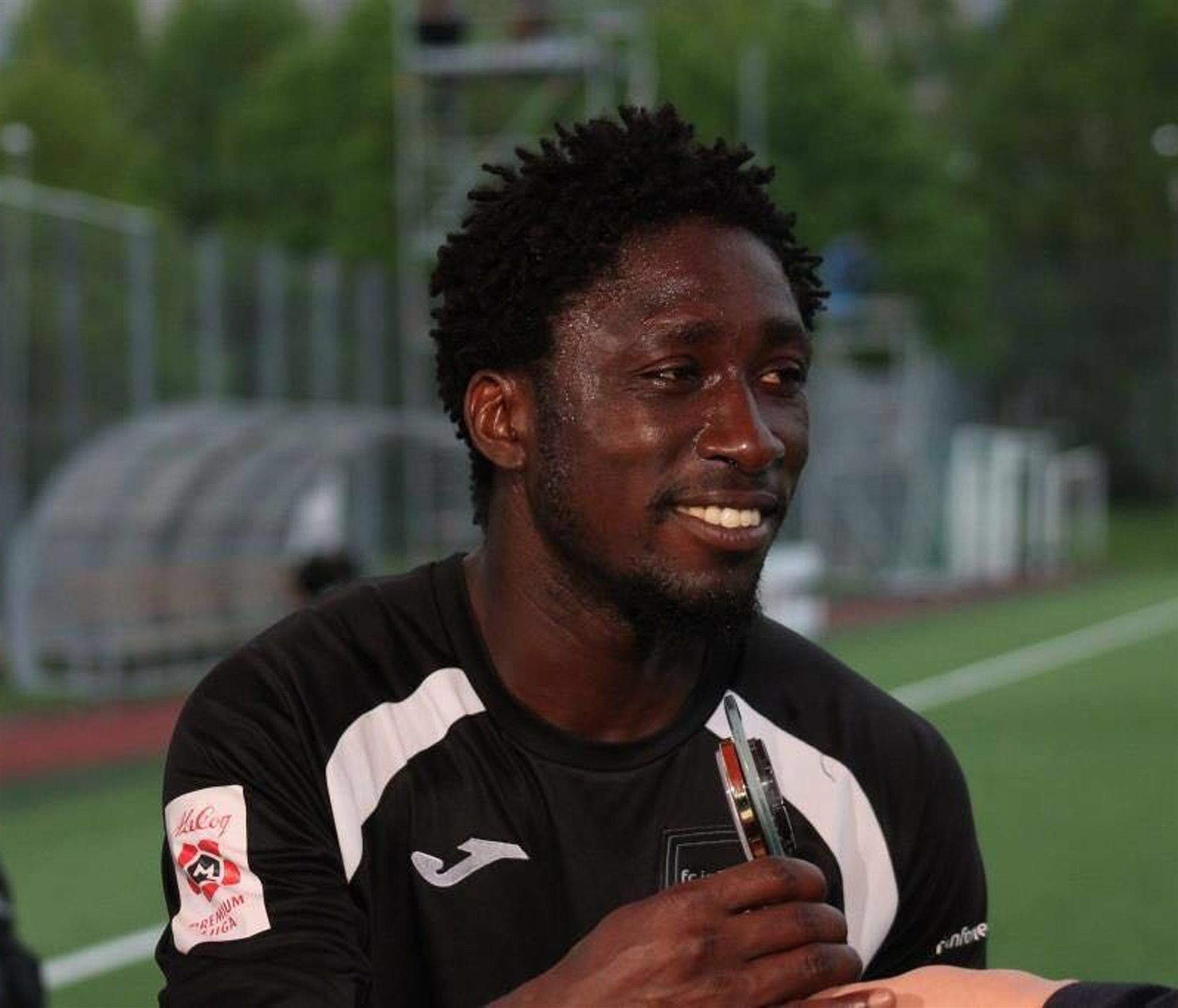
- Ofosu Appiah in 2016.

Personal information
- Full name: Michael Ofosu Appiah
- Date of birth: 29 December 1989 (age 36)
- Place of birth: Accra, Ghana
- Height: 1.82 m (6 ft 0 in)
- Position: Centre-back

Team information
- Current team: Narva Trans
- Number: 12

Senior career*
Years	Team	Apps	(Gls)
2005–2006	Ashanti Gold	15	(0)
2006–2007	Heart of Lions	0	(0)
2008–2011	Asante Kotoko		
2011–2012	Jomo Cosmos	18	(0)
2013–2016	Skonto	39	(3)
2016–2018	Infonet	40	(9)
2018	RFS	2	(0)
2019	Liepāja	1	(0)
2019	Valmieras	16	(1)
2020–	Narva Trans	21	(1)

International career
2009	Ghana	1	(0)
- * Club domestic league appearances and goals as of 21:11, 24 December 2020 (UTC)

Michael Ofosu Appiah (born 29 December 1989) is a Ghanaian former footballer who last played for FC Noah Jurmala in Latvia. He often played as a centre-back.

== Career ==
Born in Accra, Appiah started his football career at Ajax Football Academy (Kumasi) in Ghana in 2002 as central defender. He played in Ghana national under-17 football team after a call-up in a tournament. He was then promoted to the senior side of Ashanti Gold S.C. and played in 2005–06 Ghana Premier League.

At the end of his first season he got transferred to Accra base team Heart of Lions in 2006–07, and was called to the national U23 team afterwards. He was transferred from Heart of Lions to a major club in Ghana, Asante Kotoko SC for three seasons. He was asked to join Ghana Black Stars for participation during Chan tournament. He moved to South Africa, where he played for Jomo Cosmos for two seasons.

He moved to Latvia thereupon and played for Skonto FC for three seasons. He played for Estonian side FC Infonet.

On 19 June 2019, Appiah joined Valmieras FK.

On 31 January 2020, Appiah joined Narva Trans.

In August 2021, Appiah joined the Latvian team FC Noah Jurmala, for whom he made 10 appearances.

== Career stats ==
=== International ===
In 2009, Ofosu Appiah played for the Black Stars, the Ghana national football team against Argentina in a friendly international match.

Ghana national team
Year	Apps	Goals
2009	1	0
Total	1	0

Statistics accurate as of match played 30 September 2009.

== Honours ==
Individual

- Meistriliiga Player of the Month: March 2016
