= Vitālijs Rečickis =

Latvian footballer

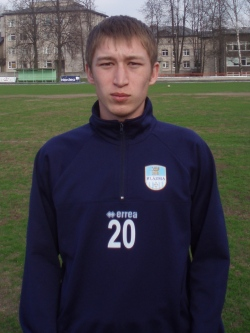
- Rečickis in training of Blāzma Rēzekne

Personal information
- Date of birth: 8 September 1986 (age 40)
- Place of birth: Rēzekne, Latvian SSR, Soviet Union (now Republic of Latvia)
- Height: 1.77 m (5 ft 9 1/2 in)
- Position: Midfielder

Team information
- Current team: Jelgava
- Number: 16

Youth career
- 1993–1996: SK Progress
- 1997–2003: Dižvanagi

Senior career*
Years	Team	Apps	(Gls)
2004–2006	Dižvanagi	28	(3)
2007–2009	Blāzma	40	(8)
2010	Aris Limassol	10	(0)
2010–2011	Tauras Tauragė	15	(2)
2012–2013	Jūrmala	28	(2)
2013	Daugava Rīga	24	(0)
2014–2018	Ventspils	96	(5)
2019	Spartaks Jūrmala	13	(1)
2019–	Jelgava	5	(0)

International career^{‡}
2018–	Latvia	1	(0)
- * Club domestic league appearances and goals as of 00:35, 13 November 2019 (UTC) ‡ National team caps and goals as of 5 June 2018

Vitālijs Rečickis (born 8 September 1986) is a Latvian footballer, currently playing for FK Jelgava in the Latvian Higher League.

== Club career ==
Rečickis started his professional career in 2004 with RSK Dižvanagi. In 2008, he became a vital figure in the SK Blāzma's starting eleven and played almost all the matches. While playing for Blāzma, he was regarded to be one of the best free-kick takers in Latvian Higher League. He often scored from different positions and was one of his team's leaders and also the captain of the team. In December 2009 he went on trial with the Cypriot club Aris Limassol and just after Christmas that year he signed his first professional contract abroad. He made 10 appearances, scoring no goals and was released in July, 2010.In September, 2010 he signed a contract with the Lithuanian A Lyga club FK Tauras Tauragė until the end of the season. He played 7 matches, scoring once. In February, 2011 he extend his contract for one more year. In summer 2011 returned to Latvia and signed for FC Jūrmala. He played 28 matches, scoring 2 goals for Jūrmala. In January 2013 Rečickis joined the Latvian Higher League club Daugava Rīga. He played 24 league matches for the club and helped it reach the 4th place in the national championship. On 16 January 2014 it was announced that Rečickis had joined that time Latvian champions FK Ventspils.

== International ==
He made his debut for Latvia national football team on 5 June 2018 in a friendly against Lithuania.

== Honours ==
- Latvian Higher League champion (1): 2014
