= FC Noah Jurmala =

Latvian football club

- Full name: Football Club "Noah Jurmala"
- Founded: 2017
- Dissolved: 2021
- Ground: RTU Stadium, Riga, Latvia
- League: Virslīga
- 2021: Latvian Higher League, 8th (relegated)

FC Noah Jurmala (until 2021 — FC Lokomotiv Daugavpils, until 2019 — LDZ Cargo/DFA) is a defunct Latvian football club. They were based in the Latvian town of Jūrmala near Rīga and, most recently before the club's termination, competed in the highest division of Latvian football (the Virslīga) and the Latvian Football Cup. On 23 June 2021, the club's administration announced their departure from the Latvian Higher League and the termination of the club, as the Latvian Football Federation and the Latvian authorities began an investigation into match fixing allegations and illicit financial activity at the club, leading to a number of suspensions and convictions.

== History ==
In 2019, the team, then known as LDZ Cargo/DFA, which was based in Daugavpils, won the Latvian Second League and were promoted to the First League. After an ownership change, it was renamed into FC Lokomotiv Daugavpils (similarly to the local speedway club Lokomotīve) and won the 2020 Latvian First League, allowing the club to participate in the Higher League for the first time in its history.

It was announced in early 2021 that the club would be rebranded as FC Noah Jurmala and move to the city of Jūrmala following a financial agreement with Armenian investors, shareholders of the Noah holding group. In early March, however, the investors reversed their decision following a conflict with the club's ownership, but the name FC Noah Jurmala remained in place due to restrictions on name changes by the Latvian Football Federation after February 1 of a calendar year.

While FC Noah Jurmala was initially given the right to compete in the Higher League, their license was revoked due to alleged financing issues on 12 March 2021. Following an unsuccessful appeal, the club administration filed with the Court of Arbitration for Sport, which on 15 April 2021, permitted the club to participate in the Higher League. FC Noah Jurmala lost their debut match on 24 April 2021 0–5 against FK Spartaks Jūrmala, and celebrated their first and only top flight victory in their 2–1 defeat of BFC Daugavpils on 14 May 2021.

On 9 June 2021, the Latvian Sports Disciplinary Committee decided to disqualify three FC Noah Jurmala players — Bojan Knežević, Ofosu Appiah, and Oleksiy Babir, for 12 months. Despite the Court of Arbitration for Sport's decision on 14 June 2021 to permit FC Noah Jurmala to continue competing in the Higher League, the team did not show up for their match against Valmiera FC on 18 June 2021 and suffered a technical loss. Shortly thereafter, the club administration informed of their decision to withdraw from all competitions from 23 June 2021, while the Latvian authorities began an investigation into the match fixing allegations and illicit financial activity of those involved with the club. The club was terminated and ceased to exist later that year.

== Honours ==
- Latvian Second League
  - Champions: 2017, 2019
- Latvian First League
  - Champions: 2020

== League and cup results ==
LDZ Cargo/DFA / FC Lokomotiv Daugavpils / FC Noah Jurmala

Season	Division (Name)	Position	Latvian Football Cup
2017	3rd (2.līga)	1st	Did not participate
2018	3rd (2.līga)	Did not qualify for final tournament	Did not participate
2019	3rd (2.līga)	1st	1/8 finals
2020	2nd (1.līga)	1st	1/8 finals
2021	1st (Virslīga)	8th	Did not participate
