= 2024 FK RFS season =

FK RFS
2024 season
- Chairman: Artjoms Milovs
- Manager: Viktors Morozs
- Stadium: LNK Sporta Parks
- Latvian Higher League: 1st (champions)
- Latvian Cup: Winners
- Latvian Supercup: Winners
- UEFA Champions League: Second qualifying round
- UEFA Europa League: League phase
- Top goalscorer: League: Jānis Ikaunieks (16); All: Jānis Ikaunieks (26)
Home colours	Away colours

The 2024 season is the 8th season in the history of FK RFS, all of which have come in the Latvian Higher League. In addition to the domestic league, the team is competing in the Latvian Cup, the UEFA Champions League, and the UEFA Europa League.

On 29 August, RFS became only the second Baltic club to reach the post-qualifying stage of the UEFA Europa League.

== Players ==
As of 15 August 2024

Note: Flags indicate national team as defined under FIFA eligibility rules; some limited exceptions apply. Players may hold more than one non-FIFA nationality.

No.	Pos.	Nation	Player
1	GK	LVA	Pāvels Šteinbors
2	DF	LVA	Daniels Balodis
3	FW	NGA	Victor Osuagwu
6	MF	GAM	Alfusainey Jatta
7	FW	CIV	Ismaël Diomandé
8	FW	GEO	Lasha Odisharia
9	MF	LVA	Jānis Ikaunieks
10	FW	BRA	Emerson Deocleciano
11	DF	LVA	Roberts Savaļnieks
13	GK	LVA	Jevgēņijs Ņerugals
15	FW	CMR	Rostand Ndjiki
16	GK	LVA	Sergejs Vilkovs
17	FW	CIV	Cedric Kouadio
18	MF	LVA	Dmitrijs Zelenkovs
21	DF	LVA	Elvis Stuglis
22	FW	SRB	Darko Lemajič
23	DF	ALB	Herdi Prenga

No.	Pos.	Nation	Player
24	FW	JPN	Mikaze Nagasawa
25	DF	CZE	Petr Mareš
26	MF	SRB	Stefan Panić
27	MF	FIN	Adam Markhiyev
28	MF	LVA	Dāvis Sedols
30	MF	GAM	Rasid Njie
33	DF	LVA	Dāvis Cucurs
40	GK	CMR	Fabrice Ondoa
43	DF	SVN	Žiga Lipušček (captain)
49	MF	LVA	Mārtiņš Ķigurs
52	DF	LVA	Mārcis Ošs
70	FW	SRB	Dragoljub Savić
77	FW	GEO	Luka Silagadze
97	MF	LVA	Jevgeņijs Miņins
99	MF	LVA	Gļebs Žaleiko
—	MF	LVA	Efraims Valutadatils
—	MF	LVA	Dāvis Sedols

== Competitions ==
=== Overall record ===
Competition	First match	Last match	Starting round	Final position	Record							
Competition	First match	Last match	Starting round	Final position	Pld	W	D	L	GF	GA	GD	Win %
Latvian Higher League	8 March 2024	9 November 2024	Matchday 1		36	29	3	4	103	25	+78	80.56
Latvian Football Cup	13 July 2024	30 October 2024	Round of 16	Winner	4	4	0	0	12	7	+5	100.00
Latvian Super Cup	2 March 2024		Final	Runners-up	1	0	1	0	1	1	+0	0.00
UEFA Champions League	10 July 2024	31 July 2024	First Qualifying Round	Second Qualifying Round	4	2	0	2	8	7	+1	50.00
UEFA Europa League	27 September 2024	TBD	Third Qualifying Round		12	4	2	6	18	16	+2	33.33
Total					57	39	6	12	142	56	+86	68.42

Last updated: 30 October 2024
Source: Competitions

=== Latvian Higher League ===
==== League table ====
Pos	Team	Pld	W	D	L	GF	GA	GD	Pts	Qualification or relegation
1	RFS (C)	36	29	3	4	103	25	+78	90	Qualification for the Champions League first qualifying round
2	Riga	36	27	6	3	99	23	+76	87	Qualification for the Conference League second qualifying round (Note: The 2024 Latvian Football Cup winners qualified for the Conference League second qualifying round. Since the cup winners (RFS) qualified based on league position, the Conference League spot was passed to the second-placed team, and the second Conference League first qualifying round spot was passed to the fourth-placed team.)
3	Auda	36	18	6	12	63	34	+29	60	Qualification for the Conference League first qualifying round
4	Valmiera (D, X)	36	19	7	10	75	39	+36	55 (Note: On 19 April, Valmiera were deducted three points, with an additional six points and a suspended 25 points deduction being issued on 11 October due to licensing regulation breaches.)	Disqualification and relegation to the Latvian Second League (Note: Valmiera were disqualified at the end of the season after being refused both Latvian Higher League and Latvian First League licenses resulting in an immediate demotion to the Latvian Second League; Jelgava were reprieved from relegation.)
5	Daugavpils	36	11	9	16	43	60	−17	42	Qualification for the Conference League first qualifying round

Source: LFF, Soccerway
Rules for classification: 1) Points; 2) Head-to-head points; 3) Head-to-head goal difference; 4) Goal difference; 5) Goals scored; 6) Fair-play ranking; 7) Play-off.
(C) Champions; (D) Disqualified; (X) Banned from Latvian Higher League license and relegated to 2025 Latvian Second League

==== Results summary ====
Overall								Home						Away					
Pld	W	D	L	GF	GA	GD	Pts	W	D	L	GF	GA	GD	W	D	L	GF	GA	GD
36	29	3	4	103	25	+78	90	14	1	3	61	14	+47	15	2	1	42	11	+31

Last updated: 10 November 2024.

===== Results by round =====
Round	1	2	3	4	5	6	7	8	9	10	11	12	13	14	15	16	17	18	19	20	21	22	23	24	25	26	27	28	29	30	31	32	33	34	35	36	37
Ground	A	H	A	H	A	H	H	A	A	H	A	H	A	H	A	A	H	H	A	H	A	H	H	A	H	H	A	H	A	H	A	A	H	A	A	H	
Result	W	L	W	W	D	W	W	W	W	W	L	W	W	W	W	W	W	D	W	W	W	W	W	W	W	W	D	L	W	W	W	W	W	W	W	L	
Position																																					

Updated to match(es) played on 10 November 2024. Source: Liga I
A = Away; H = Home; W = Win; D = Draw; L = Loss

==== Matches ====
8 March 2024 1	Auda	1 - 2	RFS	Riga
18:00 EET	W.Paugain (yellow card) 16'; Abiodun Ogunniyi (yellow card) 50' (goal) 60'; Saveļjevs (yellow card) 78'; Isajevs (yellow card) 82'; Lucas Ramos (yellow card) 87'; Meleye Diagne (yellow card) 87'	Report	Lemajić 44' (yellow card) 90+5'; Panić (yellow card) 57'; Lipušček (yellow card) 90' (goal) 90+1'; Diomandé (yellow card) 90+3'	Stadium: Mežaparks Sports Village; Attendance: 315; Referee: (Latvia) Jevgenijs Keziks

15 March 2024 2	RFS	0 - 1	Valmiera	Riga
18:00 EET	Lemajić (yellow card) 29'; Panić (yellow card) 31'	Report	Meissa Diop 25' (yellow card) 56'; Léo Gaúcho (yellow card) 47'; Guèye (yellow card) 77'	Stadium: LNK Sporta Parks (reserve pitch); Attendance: 510; Referee: (Latvia) Aleksandrs Anufrijevs

30 March 2024 3	Liepāja	0 - 3	RFS	Liepāja
14:00 EET	Vazha Patsatsia (yellow card) 41'; Dodô (yellow card) 45'; Fraj Kayramani (yellow card) 55'	Report	Prenga 31'; Mareš (yellow card) 43'; Ikaunieks (yellow card) 54'; Savaļnieks 56'; Lemajić 71'	Stadium: Daugava Stadium (reserve pitch); Attendance: 400; Referee: (Latvia) Aleksandrs Golubevs

3 April 2024 4	RFS	5 - 1	FS Jelgava	Riga
19:00 EET	Savić 4'; Emerson Deocleciano 14'; Valters Purs 28' (o.g.); Savaļnieks 30'; Lemajić 68'	Report	Ralfs Sitjakovs 87'	Stadium: LNK Sporta Parks (reserve pitch); Attendance: 316; Referee: (Latvia) Vasilijs Mordatenko

7 April 2024 5	BFC Daugavpils	1 - 1	RFS	Daugavpils
15:00 EET	Ņikita Barkovskis (yellow card) 30'; Abdoul Kader Traore 50'	Report	Emerson Deocleciano 20'; Markhiyev (yellow card) 62'	Stadium: Esplanādes stadions Attendance: 630; Referee: (Latvia) Artis Ķēniņš

12 April 2024 6	RFS	5 - 0	Tukums	Riga
19:00 EET	Mikaze Nagasawa 9'; Stuglis 20'; Cedric Kouadio 39'; Diomandé 48'; Mohamed Koné (yellow card) 81'; Ķigurs 84'	Report	Maksims Sidorovs (yellow card) 39'; Kristaps Krievins (yellow card) 77'	Stadium: LNK Sporta Parks (reserve pitch); Attendance: 363; Referee: (Latvia) Aleksejs Griščenko

17 April 2024 7	RFS	2 - 0	Metta	Riga
19:30 EET	Diomandé 56'; Mareš 65'; Lipušček (yellow card) 89'	Report	Jegors Novikovs (yellow card) 71'; Ulimbaševs (yellow card) 86'; Hugo Jesse (yellow card) 90+3'	Stadium: LNK Sporta Parks (reserve pitch); Attendance: 391; Referee: (Latvia) Sergejs Vasjkovs

23 April 2024 8	Grobiņas SC	0 - 4	RFS	Liepāja
13:00 EET		Report	Stuglis 11'; Savić 26'; Diomandé 59'; Panić 73'	Stadium: Daugava Stadium (reserve pitch); Attendance: 263; Referee: (Latvia) Vasilijs Mordatenko

27 April 2024 9	Riga	1 - 2	RFS	Riga
19:00 EET	Dašķevičs (yellow card) 18'; Gauthier Mankenda 56' (yellow card) 89'; Gonzalo Muscia (yellow card) 66'; Baba Musah (yellow card) 90+2'	Report	Mareš 13'; Diomandé (yellow card) 67'; Lemajić 80'; Ņerugals (yellow card) 87'; Lipušček (yellow card) 89'	Stadium: Skonto Stadium; Attendance: 5,314; Referee: (Latvia) Aleksandrs Golubevs

1 May 2024 10	RFS	2 - 1	Auda	Riga
16:00 EET	Emerson Deocleciano (yellow card) 16'; Mareš 20'; Savaļnieks (yellow card) 35'; Markhiyev 85' (yellow card) 90+2'	Report	Matheus Clemente 10' (yellow card) 59'; Dennis Meļņiks (yellow card) 27'; Isajevs (yellow card) 63'; Lucas Ramos (yellow card) 68'; Reginaldo Ramires (yellow card) 89'	Stadium: LNK Sporta Parks; Attendance: 644; Referee: (Latvia) Vitālijs Spasjoņņikovs

5 May 2024 11	Valmiera	2 - 0	RFS	Valmiera
14:00 EET	Porsan-Clémenté 54'; Alioune Ndoye 78' (pen.)	Report	Stuglis (yellow card) 32'; Mareš (yellow card) 45'	Stadium: Valmiera Olympic Center; Attendance: 573; Referee: (Latvia) Sergejs Vasjkovs

10 May 2024 12	RFS	4 - 1	Liepāja	Riga
18:00 EET	Lemajić 17' 31' (yellow card) 75'; Mikaze Nagasawa 51'; Lasha Odisharia 90+3'	Report	Mouhamadou Diaw 37'; Cheikh Faye (red card) 59'	Stadium: LNK Sporta Parks; Attendance: 306; Referee: (Latvia) Kristaps Ratnieks

15 May 2024 13	FS Jelgava	1 - 2	RFS	Jelgava
18:30 EET	Ikuto Gomi (yellow card) 21'; Ede Oloko 30'; Pētersons (yellow card) 75'; Dylan Maes (yellow card) 87'	Report	Markhiyev (yellow card) 30'; Dmitrijs Zelenkovs 58'; Stuglis (yellow card) 73'; Lipušček 75' (pen.)	Stadium: Zemgale Olympic Center; Attendance: 141; Referee: (Latvia) Aleksejs Griščenko

20 May 2024 14	RFS	5 - 0	BFC Daugavpils	Riga
19:00 EET	Panić 17' (yellow card) 24'; Diomandé (yellow card) 49'; Lemajić 60'; Ķigurs 63'; Savaļnieks 73'; Markhiyev (yellow card) 86'; Mareš 87' (pen.)	Report	Lawrance Shimave Ugen (yellow card) 26'; Ņikita Barkovskis (yellow card) 36' (red card) 43'; Glebs Mihalcovs (yellow card) 43'; Wally Fofana (yellow card) 49'	Stadium: LNK Sporta Parks; Attendance: 462; Referee: (Latvia) Aleksandrs Golubevs

25 May 2024 15	Tukums	0 - 1	RFS	Tukums
18:00 EET	Maksims Sidorovs (yellow card) 82'; Mihoubi (yellow card) 89'	Report	Lemajić 24'; Rasid Njie (yellow card) 80'; Panić (yellow card) 90+3'	Stadium: Tukuma Pilsētas Stadions; Attendance: 308; Referee: (Latvia) Deniss Ignatjevs

29 May 2024 16	Metta	0 - 6	RFS	Riga
18:00 EET	Jegors Novikovs (yellow card) 17'; Ralfs Pakulis (yellow card) 75'	Report	Rasid Njie 3'; Lipušček 18' (pen.) (yellow card) 53'; Markhiyev (yellow card) 26'; Emerson Deocleciano 30'; Diomandé 41'; Mareš 49'; Rostand Ndjiki 61'; Lasha Odisharia (yellow card) 80'	Stadium: Rīgas Hanzas vidusskolas stadions Attendance: 176; Referee: (Latvia) Edgars Maļcevs

2 June 2024 17	RFS	5 - 0	Grobiņas SC	Riga
18:00 EET	Prenga 8'; Diomandé 58'; Emerson Deocleciano 65' (pen.) 82'; Jānis Krautmanis 72' (o.g.); Rasid Njie (yellow card) 80'	Report	Dāvids Družiņins (yellow card) 17'	Stadium: LNK Sporta Parks; Attendance: 267; Referee: (Latvia) Vitālijs Spasjoņņikovs

16 June 2024 18	RFS	2 - 2	Riga	Riga
20:00 EET	Lipušček 10' (yellow card) 74'; Diomandé 53'; Ikaunieks (yellow card) 71'	Report	Ousseynou Niang 60'; Baba Musah 71'; Černomordijs (yellow card) 75'; Orosco (yellow card) 81'	Stadium: LNK Sporta Parks; Attendance: 1,519; Referee: (Latvia) Edgars Maļcevs

21 June 2024 19	Auda	1 - 3	RFS	Riga
20:00 EET	Ibrahim Kone (yellow card) 41'; Reginaldo Ramires (yellow card) 45+2' (goal) 76'; Oskars Rubenis (yellow card) 90'	Report	Savaļnieks 5'; Mareš (yellow card) 41'; Diomandé 48'; Ikaunieks 61'	Stadium: Skonto Stadium; Attendance: 450; Referee: (Latvia) Aleksandrs Golubevs

26 June 2024 20	RFS	4 - 1	Valmiera	Riga
20:00 EET	Ikaunieks 2' 45+2' (pen.); Rasid Njie (yellow card) 18'; Ķigurs (yellow card) 67'; Cedric Kouadio 84' 90+2'; Mareš (yellow card) 88'	Report	Bahamboula 37'; Alioune Ndoye (yellow card) 44'; Toņiševs (yellow card) 79'	Stadium: LNK Sporta Parks; Attendance: 524; Referee: (Latvia) Andris Treimanis

1 July 2024 21	Liepāja	1 - 3	RFS	Liepāja
19:00 EET	Cheikh Diouf (yellow card) 13'; Roberts Melkis 33'; Luka Silagadze (yellow card) 52'; Arcadio Baidoo (yellow card) 74'	Report	Emerson Deocleciano 13' 79'; Diomandé 56'; Rasid Njie (yellow card) 90+1'	Stadium: Daugava Stadium; Attendance: 536; Referee: (Latvia) Andrejs Gluhovs

5 July 2024 22	RFS	7 - 0	FS Jelgava	Riga
20:00 EET	Panić 5'; Diomandé 8'; Ikaunieks 26' 47'; Lasha Odisharia 40'; Lemajić 79' 88'	Report		Stadium: LNK Sporta Parks; Attendance: 283; Referee: (Latvia) Artis Ķēniņš

27 July 2024 24	Tukums	1 - 4	RFS	Tukums
16:00 EET	Bogdans Samoilovs 14' (yellow card) 66'; Vladimirs Stepanovs (yellow card) 37'; Rudolfs Reingolcs (yellow card) 45+2'; Mihoubi (yellow card) 49'; Maksims Sidorovs (yellow card) 73'	Report	Ikaunieks 25'; Ķigurs 60'; Panić 66'; Mareš 80'	Stadium: Tukuma Pilsētas Stadions; Attendance: 217; Referee: (Latvia) Aleksejs Griščenko

4 August 2024 25	RFS	5 - 1	Metta	Riga
20:00 EET	Victor Osuagwu 7'; Balodis (yellow card) 40'; Diomandé 44'; Panić 63' 85'; Prenga 68'	Report	Markuss Ivulāns 38'; Kristofers Rēķis (yellow card) 41'	Stadium: LNK Sporta Parks; Attendance: 402; Referee: (Latvia) Andrejs Gluhovs

11 August 2024 26	RFS	3 - 0	Grobiņas SC	Riga
20:00 EET	Luka Silagadze (yellow card) 38'; Lasha Odisharia (yellow card) 53'; Ikaunieks 56' 90'; Diomandé 63'	Report	Dāvids Družiņins (yellow card) 79'	Stadium: LNK Sporta Parks; Attendance: 263; Referee: (Latvia) Kristaps Ratnieks

25 August 2024 27	Riga	0 - 0	RFS	Riga
20:00 EET	Černomordijs (yellow card) 60'; Ahmed Ankrah (yellow card) 75'	Report	Dmitrijs Zelenkovs (yellow card) 61'; Lipušček (yellow card) 70'; Emerson Deocleciano (yellow card) 90+3'; Ondoa (yellow card) 90+4'	Stadium: Skonto Stadium; Attendance: 5,321; Referee: (Latvia) Andris Treimanis

13 September 2024 29	Valmiera	1 - 2	RFS	Valmiera
17:00 EET	Gustavo (yellow card) 8'; Kristers Aļekseičiks (yellow card) 29'; Niks Dusalijevs (yellow card) 35'; Bahamboula 57'; Vapne (yellow card) 68'	Report	Ikaunieks 13' (pen.) 44' (pen.); Ķigurs (yellow card) 30'; Balodis (yellow card) 33'; Prenga (yellow card) 49'; Lipušček (yellow card) 90+2'; Rostand Ndjiki (yellow card) 90+4'	Stadium: Jānis Daliņš Stadium; Attendance: 650; Referee: (Latvia) Aleksandrs Golubevs

17 September 2024 23	RFS	4 - 1	BFC Daugavpils	Riga
20:00 EET	Ķigurs 15'; Markhiyev 17'; Stuglis 45'; Ošs 79' (yellow card) 89'	Report	Arman Galajs (yellow card) 13' (goal) 89'; Rinalds Aizups (yellow card) 64'	Stadium: LNK Sporta Parks; Attendance: 215; Referee: (Latvia) Aleksejs Griščenko

20 September 2024 30	RFS	2 - 0	Liepāja	Riga
20:00 EET	Ikaunieks 8' (pen.); Panić 61'	Report	Mouhamadou Diaw (yellow card) 15'; Anto Babić (yellow card) 44'; Pape Yare Fall (yellow card) 90+1'	Stadium: LNK Sporta Parks; Attendance: 456; Referee: (Latvia) Andrejs Gluhovs

30 September 2024 31	FS Jelgava	0 - 2	RFS	Jelgava
16:00 EET	Markuss Ivanovs (yellow card) 74'	Report	Rostand Ndjiki (yellow card) 45'; Balodis (yellow card) 49'; Ikaunieks (yellow card) 69'; Lipušček 71'; Victor Osuagwu 76'	Stadium: Zemgale Olympic Center; Attendance: 187; Referee: (Latvia) Kristaps Ratnieks

6 October 2024 32	BFC Daugavpils	0 - 3	RFS	Daugavpils
17:00 EET		Report	Ikaunieks 41' 42'; Mikaze Nagasawa 90+2'	Stadium: Esplanādes stadions Attendance: 400; Referee: (Latvia) Deniss Ignatjevs

17 October 2024 28	RFS	1 - 2	Auda	Riga
18:00 EET	Ikaunieks 6'; Lipušček (yellow card) 21'	Report	Bosančić (yellow card) 22'; Mor Talla (yellow card) 59'; Hrvoj (yellow card) 67'; Matheus Clemente (yellow card) 68'; Abiodun Ogunniyi 75'; Taiwo 89'; Zviedris (yellow card) 90+3'	Stadium: LNK Sporta Parks; Attendance: 476; Referee: (Latvia) Andris Treimanis

20 October 2024 33	RFS	4 - 1	Tukums	Riga
16:00 EET	Ikaunieks 31' (pen.) 48'; Victor Osuagwu 41'; Ķigurs 46'; Markhiyev (yellow card) 48'; Rasid Njie (yellow card) 74' (yellow-red card) 89'	Report	Kristians Kauselis (yellow card) 26'; Kaspars Anmanis (yellow card) 26'; Mihoubi (yellow card) 36'; Dans Sirbu 57'	Stadium: LNK Sporta Parks; Attendance: 419; Referee: (Latvia) Andrejs Gluhovs

28 October 2024 34	Metta	1 - 2	RFS	Riga
18:30 EET	Jegors Novikovs (yellow card) 57'; Kristofers Rēķis (yellow card) 61'; Artjoms Puzirevskis (yellow card) 72'; Bruno Melnis 90+4'	Report	Panić 13'; Prenga 68'	Stadium: Daugava Stadium; Attendance: 900; Referee: (Latvia) Aleksejs Griščenko

3 November 2024 35	Grobiņas SC	0 - 2	RFS	Liepāja
13:00 EET		Report	Savaļnieks 20' (yellow card) 59'; Cedric Kouadio 71'	Stadium: Daugava Stadium (reserve pitch); Attendance: 568; Referee: (Latvia) Vitālijs Spasjoņņikovs

10 November 2024 36	RFS	1 - 2	Riga	Riga
13:00 EET	Luka Silagadze 34'; Ceti Tchibinda (yellow card) 70'; Ošs (yellow card) 76'; Markiyev (yellow card) 90+4'	Report	Jurkovskis 12'; Ahmed Ankrah (yellow card) 45+2'; Gauthier Mankenda (yellow card) 71'; Reginaldo Ramires 90+1' (pen.)	Stadium: LNK Sporta Parks; Attendance: 1,063; Referee: (Latvia) Andrejs Gluhovs

=== Latvian Cup ===
13 July 2024 Round of 16	RFS	2–1	BFC Daugavpils	Riga
20:00 EET	Rasid Njie (yellow card) 43'; Panić (yellow card) 68'; Lipušček (yellow card) 68'; Lemajić (red card) 70'; Ķigurs (yellow card) 71'; Cedric Kouadio 75'; Ikaunieks 81'	Report	Mareks Mikšto (yellow card) 2'; Diedhiou 17'; Wally Fofana (yellow card) 57'; Nikita Sarakins (yellow card) 71'; Rinalds Aizups (yellow card) 71'; Glebs Mihalcovs (yellow card) 90+4'	Stadium: LNK Sporta Parks; Attendance: 203; Referee: (Latvia) Vasilijs Mordatenko

17 August 2024 Quarter-Finals	Valmiera	3–4	RFS	Valmiera
14:00 EET	Birka (yellow card) 33'; Toņiševs (yellow card) 37'; Vapne 45+3' (yellow card) 52'; Dāvis Ošs (yellow card) 45+6'; Bahamboula 71'; Kristers Penkevics (yellow card) 72'; Guèye 76'	Report	Rasid Njie 34'; Balodis 53'; Rostand Ndjiki 59' 70' (yellow card) 90+3'	Stadium: Jānis Daliņš Stadium; Attendance: 750; Referee: (Latvia) Edgars Maļcevs

23 September 2024 Semi-finals	RFS	2–1	Riga	Riga
19:00 EET	Rostand Ndjiki 66' (yellow card) 83'; Rasid Nije 85'; Šteinbors (yellow card) 88'	Report	Regža 33'; Ahmed Ankrah (yellow card) 64'; El Bachir Ngom (yellow card) 64'; Černomordijs (yellow card) 72'; Erquiaga (yellow card) 74'; Orosco (yellow card) 79'	Stadium: LNK Sporta Parks; Attendance: 1,018; Referee: (Latvia) Edgars Maļcevs

30 October 2024 Final	RFS	4–2 (a.e.t.)	Auda	Riga
19:45 EET	Mamadou Sylla (yellow card) 37'; Ošs 45+2' (yellow card) 88'; Stuglis (yellow card) 80'; Balodis 84'; Rostand Ndjiki 109'; Rasid Njie (yellow card) 120+1'; Panić 120+4'	Report	Bruno Tavares 8' (yellow card) 112'; Mor Talla 18' (yellow card) 90'; Hrvoj (yellow card) 108'; Bosančić (yellow card) 116'	Stadium: LNK Sporta Parks; Attendance: 1,699; Referee: (Latvia) Aleksandrs Golubevs

=== UEFA Champions League ===
==== First qualifying round ====
10 July 2024 First leg	RFS (Latvia)	3–0	(Northern Ireland) Larne	LNK Sporta Parks, Riga
19:00 (20:00 EEST)	Ķigurs 30'; Balodis 49'; Panić 60'	Report		Attendance: 1,700; Referee: Ondřej Berka (Czech Republic)

17 July 2024 Second leg	Larne (Northern Ireland)	0–4 (0–7 agg.)	(Latvia) RFS	Inver Park, Larne
21:00 (20:00 BST)		Report	Emerson 38'; Lemajić 44'; Ikaunieks 45+3'; Diomandé 56'	Attendance: 2,030; Referee: Gustavo Correia (Portugal)

==== Second qualifying round ====
23 July 2024 First leg	Bodø/Glimt (Norway)	4–0	(Latvia) RFS	Aspmyra Stadion, Bodø
17:00	Mikkelsen 2', 76'; Saltnes 18'; Kapskarmo 40'	Report		Attendance: 5,427; Referee: Don Robertson (Scotland)

31 July 2024 Second leg	RFS (Latvia)	1–3 (1–7 agg.)	(Norway) Bodø/Glimt	LNK Sporta Parks, Riga
19:00 (20:00 EEST)	Ikaunieks 14'	Report	Hauge 40' (pen.); Saltnes 82'; Høgh 88'	Attendance: 1,678; Referee: Jakob Sundberg (Denmark)

=== UEFA Europa League ===
==== Third qualifying round ====
8 August 2024 First leg	UE Santa Coloma (Andorra)	0–2	(Latvia) RFS	Estadi Nacional, Andorra la Vella
20:00		Report	Ikaunieks 13'; Osuagwu 37'	Attendance: 369; Referee: Yigal Frid (Israel)

14 August 2024 Second leg	RFS (Latvia)	7–0 (9–0 agg.)	(Andorra) UE Santa Coloma	LNK Sporta Parks, Riga
18:00 (19:00 EEST)	Ikaunieks 2', 10', 22'; Lipušček 17'; Osuagwu 44'; Ķigurs 67'; Mareš 77' (pen.)	Report		Attendance: 1,614; Referee: Juxhin Xhaja (Albania)

==== Play-off round ====
22 August 2024 First leg	RFS (Latvia)	2–1	(Cyprus) APOEL	LNK Sporta Parks, Riga
19:00 (20:00 EEST)	Kouadio 31'; Ikaunieks 45+1' (pen.)	Report	El-Arabi 52'	Attendance: 1,678; Referee: Aliyar Aghayev (Azerbaijan)

29 August 2024 Second leg	APOEL (Cyprus)	2–1 (a.e.t.) (3–3 agg.) (2–4 p)	(Latvia) RFS	GSP Stadium, Nicosia
19:00 (20:00 EEST)	Sušić 75'; Donis 90+5'	Report	Ikaunieks 40'	Attendance: 12,988; Referee: Georgi Kabakov (Bulgaria)
	Penalties
	El-Arabi (penalty scored); Sarfo (penalty missed); Quintillà (penalty scored); Dvali (penalty missed)		(penalty scored) Ikaunieks; (penalty scored) Lipušček; (penalty scored) Prenga; (penalty scored) Panić

==== League phase ====
The draw for the league phase was held on 30 August 2024.

Pos	Team	Pld	W	D	L	GF	GA	GD	Pts
30	(Football Association of the Czech Republic) Slavia Prague	8	1	2	5	7	11	−4	5
31	(Swedish Football Association) Malmö FF	8	1	2	5	10	17	−7	5
32	(Latvian Football Federation) RFS	8	1	2	5	6	13	−7	5
33	(Bulgarian Football Union) Ludogorets Razgrad	8	0	4	4	4	11	−7	4
34	(Ukrainian Association of Football) Dynamo Kyiv	8	1	1	6	5	18	−13	4

Source: UEFA
Rules for classification: League phase tiebreakers

Round	1	2	3	4	5	6	7	8
Ground	A	H	A	H	H	A	H	A
Result	L	D	L	D	L	L	W	L
Position	33	29	31	31	34	34	30	32
Points	0	1	1	2	2	2	5	5

Updated to match(es) played on 12 December 2024. Source: UEFA
A = Away; H = Home; W = Win; D = Draw; L = Loss

26 September 2024 1	FCSB (Romania)	4–1	(Latvia) RFS	Bucharest, Romania
22:00 UTC+3	Bîrligea 8'; Ștefănescu 32'; Olaru 58' 69'; Chiricheș (yellow card) 89'	Report	Lipušček 23'	Stadium: Arena Națională; Attendance: 34,257; Referee: (Spain) Ricardo de Burgos Bengoetxea

3 October 2024 2	RFS (Latvia)	2–2	(Turkey) Galatasaray	Riga, Latvia
19:45 UTC+3	Panić (yellow card) 30'; Ikaunieks 40' (yellow card) 83'; Lasha Odisharia 54'	Report	Mertens 12'; Akgün (yellow card) 18' (goal) 38'; Demirbay (yellow card) 85'	Stadium: Daugava Stadium; Attendance: 8,502; Referee: (Slovakia) Filip Glova
Note: RFS will play their home matches at Daugava Stadium, Riga, instead of their regular stadium, LNK Sporta Parks, Riga, which did not meet UEFA requirements.

24 October 2024 3	Eintracht Frankfurt (Germany)	1–0	(Latvia) RFS	Frankfurt, Germany
18:45 UTC+2	Larsson 79' (yellow card) 86'	Report		Stadium: Waldstadion; Attendance: 56,600; Referee: (Netherlands) Allard Lindhout

7 November 2024 4	RFS (Latvia)	1–1	(Belgium) Anderlecht	Riga, Latvia
22:00 UTC+2	Ikaunieks (yellow card) 23'; N'Diaye 90+6' (o.g.)	Report	Simić (yellow card) 67'; Coosemans (yellow card) 72'; Stroeykens 85'	Stadium: Daugava Stadium; Attendance: 4,820; Referee: (North Macedonia) Aleksandar Stavrev
Note: RFS will play their home matches at Daugava Stadium, Riga, instead of their regular stadium, LNK Sporta Parks, Riga, which did not meet UEFA requirements.

28 November 2024 5	RFS (Latvia)	0–2	(Greece) PAOK	Riga, Latvia
19:45 UTC+2		Report	Despodov 2'; Mady Camara (yellow card) 47'; Chalov 59'	Stadium: Daugava Stadium; Attendance: 5,346; Referee: (Austria) Julian Weinberger
Note: RFS will play their home matches at Daugava Stadium, Riga, instead of their regular stadium, LNK Sporta Parks, Riga, which did not meet UEFA requirements.

12 December 2024 6	Maccabi Tel Aviv (Israel)	2–1	(Latvia) RFS	Belgrade
21:00	Nachmias 16'; Stojić 69'; Weslley Patati (yellow card) 84'; Turgeman (yellow card) 90+2'	Report	Savaļnieks 52'; Lasha Odisharia (yellow card) 68'; Markhiyev (yellow card) 83'	Stadium: Partizan Stadium; Attendance: 253; Referee: (Hungary) Tamás Bognár
Note: Due to the Gaza war, Israeli teams are required to play their home matches at neutral venues until further notice.

23 January 2025 7	RFS (Latvia)	1–0	(Netherlands) Ajax	Riga, Latvia
22:00 UTC+2	Markhiyev 78'	Report		Stadium: Daugava Stadium; Attendance: 10461; Referee: (Romania) Marian Barbu
Note: RFS will play their home matches at Daugava Stadium, Riga, instead of their regular stadium, LNK Sporta Parks, Riga, which did not meet UEFA requirements.

30 January 2025 8	Dynamo Kyiv (Ukraine)	1–0	(Latvia) RFS	Hamburg, Germany
21:00 UTC+1	Pikhalyonok 76'	Report		Stadium: Volksparkstadion; Attendance: 3698; Referee: (Israel) Orel Grinfeeld
Note: Due to the Russian invasion of Ukraine, Ukrainian teams are required to play their home matches at neutral venues until further notice. Therefore, Dynamo Kyiv will play their home matches at Volksparkstadion, Hamburg, Germany, instead of their regular stadium, Olympic Stadium, Kyiv.

== See also ==
- 2009 FK Ventspils season
