= FK RFS in European football =

Latvian club in European football

- Club: FK RFS
- Seasons played: 5
- First entry: 2019–20 UEFA Europa League
- Latest entry: 2026–27 UEFA Conference League

These are the matches FK RFS have played in European football competitions. Having only been founded in 2016, the club's first entry into European competitions was in the 2019–20 UEFA Europa League, qualifying for the first qualifying round after a third place finish in their 2018 league campaign.

Following a first place finish in the 2021 season, FK RFS qualified for the 2022–23 UEFA Champions League first qualifying round. After a defeat to Finnish champions HJK Helsinki, RFS dropped down into the third qualifying round of the 2022–23 UEFA Europa Conference League. Being put against Hibernians of Malta, they won away and then drew in the home leg, putting the through into a play-off round fixture against Northern Irish club Linfield. After a penalty shoot-out victory, RFS qualified for the group stages of a European competition. In the group stage, RFS were drawn against Fiorentina, who went on to reach the final; İstanbul Başakşehir, who topped the group; and Heart of Midlothian, who lost in the group stage as well. Against these teams, RFS found no success, losing 4 and drawing 2 games, and only scoring 2 goals in their entire campaign.

In 2024, RFS qualified for their first ever Europa League League Phase. In their 1st Game, they played Romanian Liga I champions FCSB. Away from home, they lost 4–1, the only goal coming from club captain and centre-back Žiga Lipušček. In the following match, RFS played against Turkish Super Lig champions Galatasaray. Before the match, they were considered underdogs, with very few people backing them to get a result. Affirming this, Galatasaray went 2–0 up in the first 40 minutes. Despite the odds, goals from striker Janis Ikaunieks, and young winger Lasha Odisharia put them level at 2–2 by the 55th minute. The score stayed, and RFS made a brilliant comeback to draw the game against the heavy favourites. After losses to Eintracht Frankfurt, PAOK, and Maccabi Tel Aviv, and a draw versus RSC Anderlecht, RFS found themselves mathematically eliminated in 34th in the league phase. Despite being eliminated the previous game, Adam Markhiyev scored a late goal vs Dutch side Ajax to secure a historic 1–0 victory. However, a loss to Dynamo Kiev caused them to finish the league phase on 5 points, eliminated in 32nd.

Due to being crowned champions in the 2024 Virsliga campaign, RFS automatically qualify for the 2025-26 UEFA Champions League first qualifying round.

== Key ==
- S = Seasons
- Pld = Matches played
- W = Matches won
- D = Matches drawn
- L = Matches lost
- GF = Goals for
- GA = Goals against
- a.e.t. = Match determined after extra time
- p = Match determined by penalty shoot-out
- a = Match determined by away goals rule
- QF = Quarter-finals
- KO = Knockout round
- League = League Phase
- Group = Group stage
- Group 2 = Second group stage
- PO = Play-off round
- RO16 = Round of 16
- R3 = Round 3
- R2 = Round 2
- R1 = Round 1
- Q3 = Third qualification round
- Q2 = Second qualification round
- Q1 = First qualification round
- QR = Qualification round

== Matches ==
The following is a complete list of matches played by FK RFS in UEFA tournaments. It includes the season, tournament, the stage, the opponent club and the scores in home and away, with FK RFS's score noted first. It is up to date as of 14 August 2024.

List of FK RFS matches in European football
Season	Tournament	Round	Opponent	Home	Away	Aggregate	Ref.
2019–20	Europa League	Q1	(Slovenia) Olimpija Ljubljana	0–2	3–2	3–4	
2020–21	Europa League	Q1	(Serbia) Partizan	0–1	—	0–1	
2021–22	Europa Conference League	Q1	(Faroe Islands) KÍ Klaksvík	2–3	4–2 (a.e.t.)	6–5	
2021–22	Europa Conference League	Q2	(Hungary) Puskás Akadémia	3–0	2–0	5–0	
2021–22	Europa Conference League	Q3	(Belgium) Gent	2–2	0–1	2–3	
2022–23	Champions League	Q1	(Finland) HJK Helsinki	2–1 (a.e.t.)	0–1	2–2 (4–5 p)	
2022–23	Europa Conference League	Q3	(Malta) Hibernians	1–1	3–1	4–2	
2022–23	Europa Conference League	PO	(Northern Ireland) Linfield	2–2	1–1 (a.e.t.)	3–3 (4–2 p)	
2022–23	Europa Conference League	Group	(Italy) Fiorentina	0–3	1–1	4th	
2022–23	Europa Conference League	Group	(Scotland) Heart of Midlothian	0–2	1–2	4th	
2022–23	Europa Conference League	Group	(Turkey) Istanbul Başakşehir	0–0	0–3	4th	
2023–24	Europa Conference League	Q1	(North Macedonia) Makedonija GP	4–1	1–0	5–1	
2023–24	Europa Conference League	Q2	(Azerbaijan) Sabah	0–2	1–2	1–4	
2024–25	Champions League	Q1	(Northern Ireland) Larne	3–0	4–0	7–0	
2024–25	Champions League	Q2	(Norway) Bodø/Glimt	1–3	0–4	1–7	
2024–25	Europa League	Q3	(Andorra) UE Santa Coloma	7–0	2–0	9–0	
2024–25	Europa League	PO	(Cyprus) APOEL	2–1	1–2	3–3 (4–2 p)	
2024–25	Europa League	League	(Romania) FCSB	–	1–4	32nd	
2024–25	Europa League	League	(Turkey) Galatasaray	2–2	–	32nd	
2024–25	Europa League	League	(Germany) Eintracht Frankfurt	–	0–1	32nd	
2024–25	Europa League	League	(Belgium) Anderlecht	1–1	–	32nd	
2024–25	Europa League	League	(Greece) PAOK	0–2	–	32nd	
2024–25	Europa League	League	(Israel) Maccabi Tel Aviv	–	1–2	32nd	
2024–25	Europa League	League	(Netherlands) Ajax Amsterdam	1–0	–	32nd	
2024–25	Europa League	League	(Ukraine) Dynamo Kyiv	–	0–1	32nd	
2025-26	Champions League	Q1	(Estonia) Levadia Tallinn	1–0	1–0	2–0	
2025-26	Champions League	Q2	(Sweden) Malmö	1–4	0–1	1–5	
2025-26	Europa League	Q3	(Finland) KuPS	1–2	0–1	1–3	
2025-26	Conference League	PO	(Malta) Hamrun Spartans	2–2	0–1	2–3	
2026-27	Conference League	Q1	(Northern Ireland) Glentoran	2–0	2–1	4–1	
2026-27	Conference League	Q2	(Iceland) Vestri	4–1	1–1	5–2	
2026-27	Conference League	Q3	(Czech Republic) Jablonec	–	0–2	TBD	

== European Record ==
=== By Competition ===
The following is a list of the all-time statistics from RFS's games in the 3 UEFA tournaments it has participated in. The list contains the tournament, the number of matches played (Pld), won (W), drawn (D) and lost (L). The number of goals for (GF), goals against (GA), goal difference (GD) and the percentage of matches won (Win%). The statistics include qualification matches and is up to date as of the 2024–25 season. The statistics also include goals scored during extra time where applicable; in these games, the result given is the result at the end of extra time.

As of match played 3 September 2025

Tournament	Pld	W	D	L	GF	GA	GD	Win%
UEFA Champions League	10	5	0	5	13	14	−1	50.00
UEFA Europa League	17	3	2	12	18	20	−2	17.65
UEFA Conference League	21	6	7	8	30	32	−2	28.57

=== By Club ===
The following list details FK RFS's all-time record against clubs they have met one or more times in European competition. The club and its country are given, as well as the number of games played (Pld), won by RFS (W), drawn (D) and lost by RFS (L), goals for RFS (GF), goals against RFS (GA), RFS's goal difference (GD), and their win percentages. Statistics are correct as of the 2024–25 season and include goals scored during extra time where applicable; in these games, the result given is the result at the end of extra time.

Accurate as of 3 September 2025.

Positive balance (more wins than losses)
Neutral balance (as many wins as losses)
Negative balance (more losses than wins)

Club	Played	Won	Drew	Lost	GF	GA	GD	Win%
(Netherlands) Ajax Amsterdam	1	1	0	0	1	0	+1	100.00
(Belgium) Anderlecht	1	0	1	0	1	1	+0	0.00
(Cyprus) APOEL	2	1	0	1	3	3	+0	50.00
(Norway) Bodø/Glimt	2	0	0	2	1	7	−6	0.00
(Ukraine) Dynamo Kyiv	1	0	0	1	0	1	−1	0.00
(Germany) Eintracht Frankfurt	1	0	0	1	0	1	−1	0.00
(Romania) FCSB	1	0	0	1	1	4	−3	0.00
(Italy) Fiorentina	2	0	1	1	1	4	−3	0.00
(Turkey) Galatasaray	1	0	1	0	2	2	+0	0.00
(Belgium) Gent	2	0	1	1	2	3	−1	0.00
(Malta) Ħamrun Spartans	2	0	1	1	2	3	−1	0.00
(Scotland) Heart of Midlothian	2	0	0	2	1	4	−3	0.00
(Malta) Hibernians	2	1	1	0	4	2	+2	50.00
(Finland) HJK Helsinki	2	1	0	1	2	2	+0	50.00
(Turkey) İstanbul Başakşehir	2	0	1	1	0	3	−3	0.00
(Faroe Islands) KÍ Klaksvík	2	1	0	1	6	5	+1	50.00
(Finland) KuPS	2	0	0	2	1	3	−2	0.00
(Northern Ireland) Larne	2	2	0	0	7	0	+7	100.00
(Estonia) Levadia Tallinn	2	2	0	0	2	0	+2	100.00
(Northern Ireland) Linfield	2	0	2	0	3	3	+0	0.00
(Israel) Maccabi Tel Aviv	1	0	0	1	1	2	−1	0.00
(North Macedonia) Makedonija GP	2	2	0	0	5	1	+4	100.00
(Sweden) Malmö	2	0	0	2	1	5	−4	0.00
(Slovenia) Olimpija Ljubljana	2	1	0	1	3	4	−1	50.00
(Greece) PAOK	1	0	0	1	0	2	−2	0.00
(Serbia) Partizan	1	0	0	1	0	1	−1	0.00
(Hungary) Puskás Akadémia	2	2	0	0	5	0	+5	100.00
(Azerbaijan) Sabah	2	0	0	2	1	4	−3	0.00
(Andorra) UE Santa Coloma	2	2	0	0	9	0	+9	100.00

=== UEFA Club Ranking ===
As of 3 September 2025

Rank	Team	Points
122	(Bosnia and Herzegovina) Borac Banja Luka	13.125
123	(Belgium) Cercle Brugge	12.750
124	(Latvia) FK RFS	12.500
125	(Switzerland) Servette	12.500
126	(Kazakhstan) Astana	12.500

== Player Statistics ==
=== Goalscorers ===
As of match played 3 September 2025

	Name	Pos.	Years	UEFA Champions League	UEFA Europa League	UEFA Conference League	Total	Ratio
1	(Latvia) Jānis Ikaunieks	FW	2020 2023–Present	2 (7)	7 (13)	1 (5)	10 (25)	0.4
2	(Serbia) Darko Lemajić	FW	2019–2021 2023–Present	2 (5)	1 (10)	6 (11)	9 (27)	0.33
3	(Serbia) Andrej Ilić	FW	2021–2023	0 (2)	-	6 (14)	6 (14)	0.43
4	(Serbia) Stefan Panić	MF	2022–Present	4 (8)	0 (15)	2 (9)	6 (33)	0.13
5	(Slovenia) Žiga Lipušček	DF	2020–Present	0 (10)	2 (14)	2 (21)	4 (45)	0.09
6	(Brazil) Emerson Deocleciano	FW	2020–2025	1 (5)	0 (3)	2 (19)	3 (27)	0.11
7	(Ivory Coast) Cedric Kouadio	MF	2019–Present	0 (4)	1 (15)	2 (12)	3 (31)	0.1
8	(Austria) Kevin Friesenbichler	FW	2021–2023	0 (2)	-	3 (15)	3 (17)	0.18
9	(Latvia) Mārtiņš Ķigurs	MF	2024–Present	1 (4)	1 (8)	0 (1)	2 (13)	0.15
10	(Latvia) Arturs Zjuzins	MF	2018–2024	1 (2)	-	1 (12)	2 (14)	0.14
11	(Nigeria) Victor Osuagwu	MF	2024–Present	-	2 (7)	-	2 (7)	0.29
12	(Czech Republic) Petr Mareš	DF	2021–Present	0 (8)	1 (7)	1 (18)	2 (33)	0.06
13	(Latvia) Daniels Balodis	DF	2018 2024–2025	1 (3)	0 (8)	-	1 (11)	0.09
14	(Ivory Coast) Ismaël Diomandé	MF	2022–Present	1 (5)	0 (5)	0 (5)	1 (15)	0.07
15	(Latvia) Gļebs Kļuškins	MF	2018–2020	-	1 (1)	-	1 (1)	1
16	(Croatia) Tin Vukmanic	MF	2019	-	1 (2)	-	1 (2)	0.5
17	(Senegal) Barthélemy Diedhiou	FW	2025–Present	0 (4)	1 (3)	0 (1)	1 (8)	0.13
18	(Georgia (country)) Lasha Odisharia	FW	2024–Present	0 (5)	1 (11)	-	1 (16)	0.06
19	(Croatia) Tomislav Šarić	MF	2020–2022	0 (2)	0 (1)	1 (13)	1 (16)	0.06
20	(Austria) Tomáš Šimkovič	MF	2019–2022 2022–2023	-	0 (3)	1 (13)	1 (16)	0.06
21	(Latvia) Vitālijs Jagodinskis	DF	2009 2019–2020 2020–2024	0 (2)	0 (3)	1 (15)	1 (20)	0.05
22	(Finland) Adam Markhiyev	MF	2023–2025	0 (4)	1 (12)	0 (4)	1 (20)	0.05
23	(Latvia) Roberts Savalnieks	MF	2017–2022 2023–Present	0 (5)	1 (17)	0 (10)	1 (33)	0.03
24	Own goal	-	2019–Present	0 (10)	1 (16)	1 (21)	1 (47)	0.02
