= Elvis Stuglis =

Latvian footballer

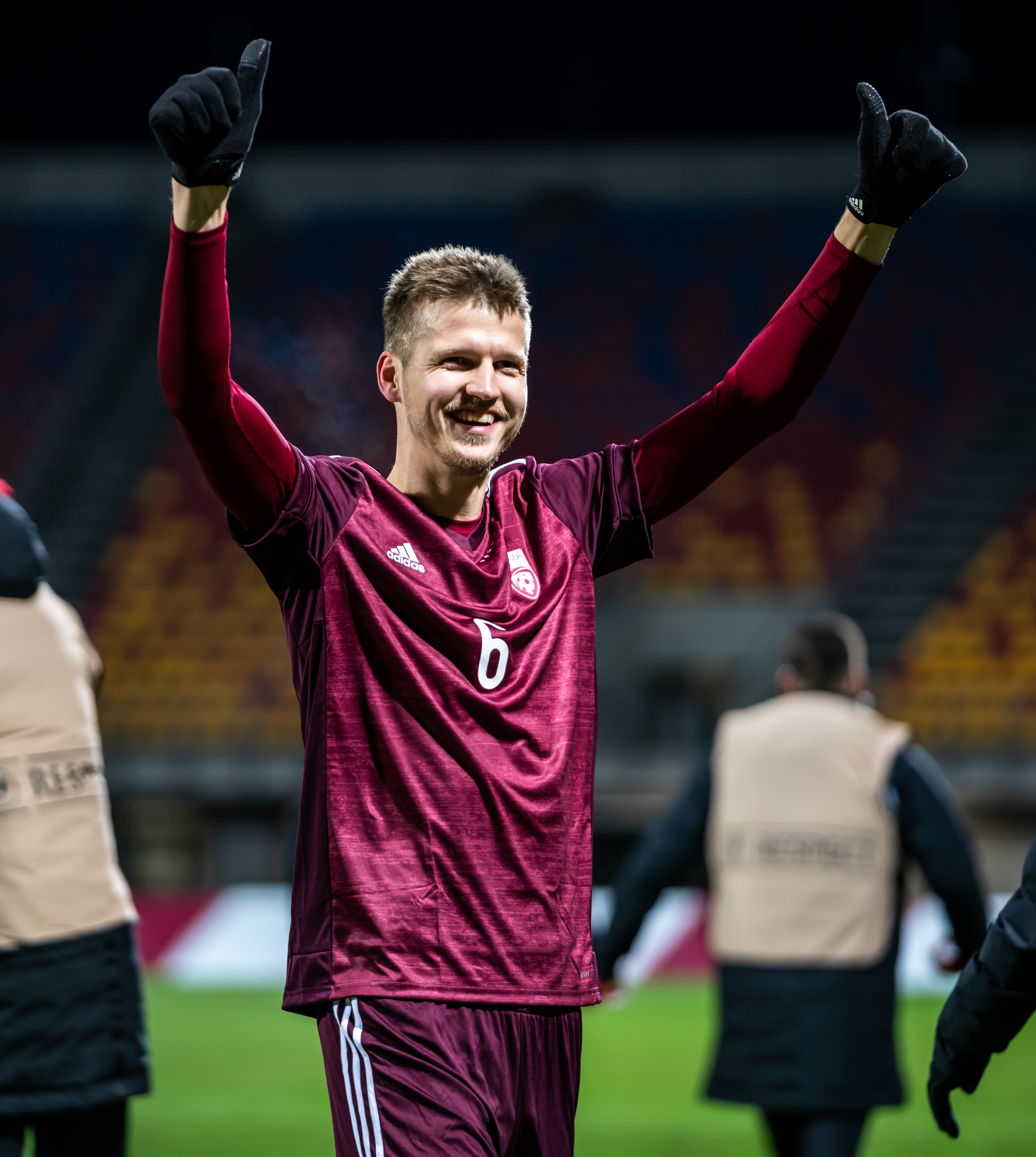
- Stuglis with Latvia

Personal information
- Date of birth: 4 July 1993 (age 33)
- Place of birth: Aizkraukle, Latvia
- Height: 1.92 m (6 ft 4 in)
- Position: Centre-back

Team information
- Current team: RFS
- Number: 21

Senior career*
Years	Team	Apps	(Gls)
2010	JFK Olimps/RFS	20	(4)
2011–2014	Skonto FC	12	(1)
2014	FK Metta/LU	15	(3)
2014–2018	Spartaks Jūrmala	67	(11)
2018–2020	Riga	57	(11)
2021–2023	RFS	56	(9)
2023–2024	Chrobry Głogów	5	(0)
2024–	RFS	40	(6)

International career^{‡}
2009	Latvia U17	3	(0)
2011	Latvia U19	3	(1)
2012–2015	Latvia U21	18	(0)
2020–	Latvia	10	(0)
- * Club domestic league appearances and goals as of 17 November 2025 ‡ National team caps and goals as of 24 July 2023

Elvis Stuglis (born 4 July 1993) is a Latvian professional footballer who plays as a centre-back for Latvian Higher League club RFS and the Latvia national team.

== Career ==
Stuglis made his international debut for Latvia on 7 October 2020 in a friendly match against Montenegro, which finished as a 1–1 away draw.

== Career statistics ==
=== International ===
As of 7 July 2023

Latvia
Year	Apps	Goals
2020	3	0
2021	2	0
2022	4	0
2023	1	0
Total	10	0

== Honours ==
Spartaks Jūrmala

- Latvian Higher League: 2016, 2017

Riga

- Latvian Higher League: 2018, 2019, 2020
- Latvian Cup: 2018

RFS

- Latvian Higher League: 2021, 2024
- Latvian Cup: 2021, 2024
