= Pāvels Šteinbors =

Latvian footballer

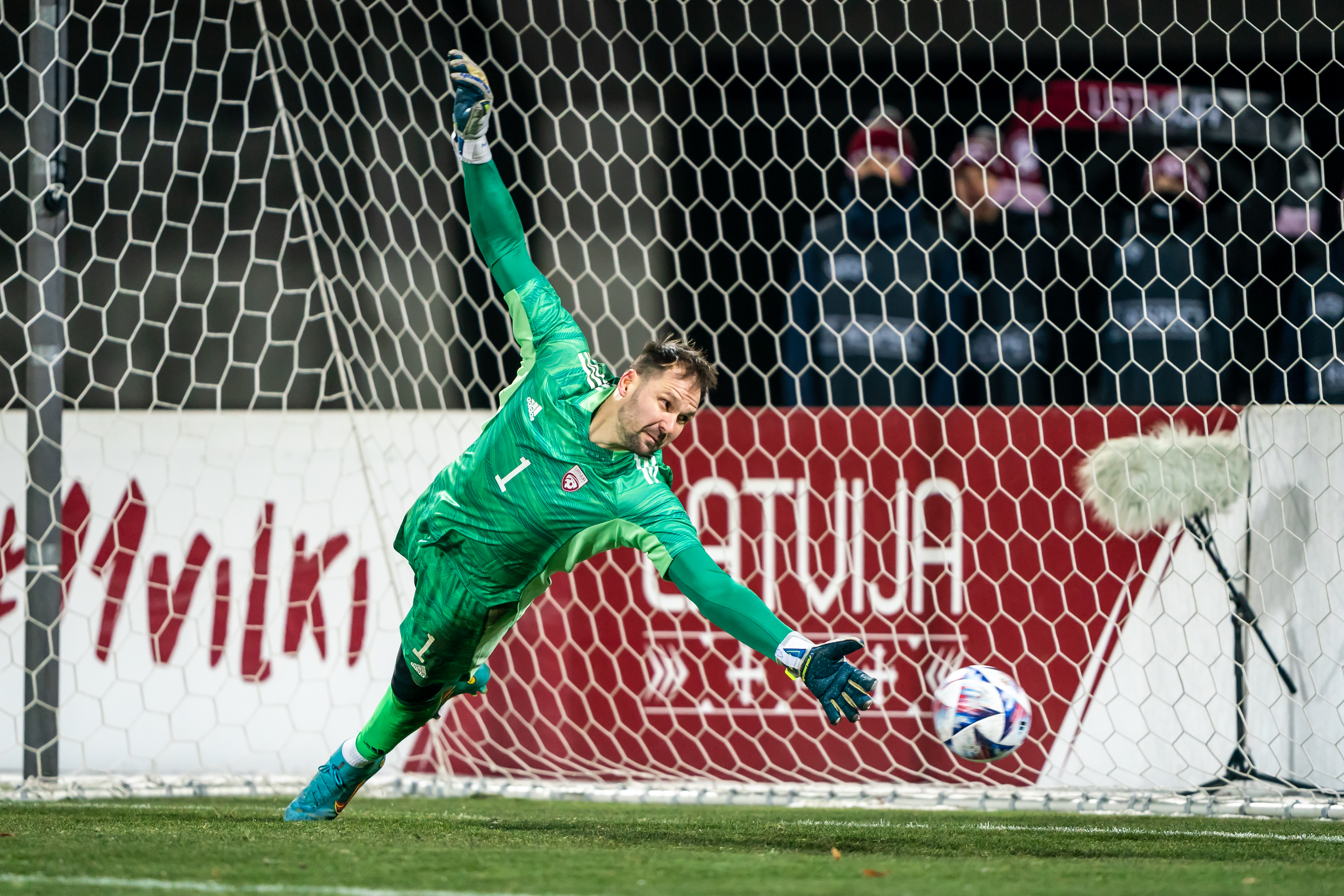
- Šteinbors playing for Latvia

Personal information
- Date of birth: 21 September 1985 (age 41)
- Place of birth: Riga, Latvia
- Height: 1.91 m (6 ft 3 in)
- Position: Goalkeeper

Youth career
- JFC Skonto

Senior career*
Years	Team	Apps	(Gls)
2001–2003	JFC Skonto	31	(0)
2004–2008	FK Jūrmala	43	(0)
2008	→ Blackpool (loan)	0	(0)
2008–2012	Liepājas Metalurgs	53	(0)
2012–2013	Golden Arrows	19	(0)
2013–2015	Górnik Zabrze	54	(0)
2015–2016	Nea Salamina	16	(0)
2016–2020	Arka Gdynia	102	(0)
2020–2022	Jagiellonia Białystok	20	(0)
2022–2025	FK RFS	31	(0)
Total		369	(0)

International career
2003–2004	Latvia U19	2	(0)
2005–2007	Latvia U21	8	(0)
2015–2024	Latvia	31	(0)
- * Club domestic league appearances and goals

Pāvels Šteinbors (born 21 September 1985) is a Latvian former professional footballer who played as a goalkeeper.

== Club career ==
As a youth player, Šteinbors was a member of the JFC Skonto youth academy. He was taken to the first team of the academy in 2001.

In January 2004, Šteinbors joined another Latvian Higher League club FK Jūrmala, where he could finally settle down. He showed some high-class performances and was regarded as one of the most talented Latvian youngsters. In December 2007 Šteinbors went on trial with the Football League Championship side Blackpool, impressing the coaching staff. On 16 January 2008, the German 2. Bundesliga club FC Augsburg reported that Šteinbors was on trial with them in their training camp in Faro, Portugal. However, on 31 January 2008, Šteinbors signed a loan deal with Blackpool until the end of the 2007–08 season with an option to extend it for another year. The loan was then extended and Šteinbors joined his countryman and current Latvian international Kaspars Gorkšs at Bloomfield Road. During his loan spell, Šteinbors regularly played in the reserve team, but didn't make an appearance for the first team.

After the end of the loan contract, he returned to the Latvian Higher League, moving to FK Liepājas Metalurgs in 2009. During the 2009 and 2010 seasons, he was the back-up keeper for the team behind experienced Viktors Spole. In 2011, Šteinbors claimed the first keeper's place, showing great performance and being included in the sportacents.com team of the season. All in all he played 53 league matches for Metalurgs.

On 15 July 2012, Šteinbors moved to the South African Premier Soccer League club Golden Arrows for the 2012–13 season. He started the season as the club's first keeper, but lost his place in the line-up in midseason, with the team struggling to show good results.

In July 2013, Šteinbors moved to the Polish Ekstraklasa, signing a two-year contract with Górnik Zabrze after a successful trial period. He made his debut for the club on 17 August 2013 in a Polish Cup match against GKS Bełchatów, playing 90 minutes and keeping a clean-sheet.

== International career ==
In 2003, Šteinbors played for Latvia U19s, and in 2005, he was called up to the under-21 side. Šteinbors made his debut for the senior Latvia national team on 13 November 2015 in a 0–1 friendly loss to Northern Ireland.

== Honours ==
Liepājas Metalurgs

- Latvian Higher League: 2009

Arka Gdynia

- Polish Cup: 2016–17
- Polish Super Cup: 2017, 2018

FK RFS

- Latvian Higher League: 2023, 2024
- Latvian Cup: 2024

Individual

- Latvian Footballer of the Year: 2019, 2020
