= Ismaël Diomandé =

Ismaël Diomandé may refer to:

- Ismaël Diomandé (footballer, born 1992)
- Ismaël Diomandé (footballer, born 2003)
