= Adam Markhiyev =

Finnish footballer (born 2002)

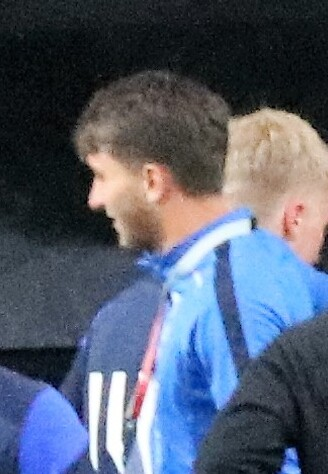
- Markhiyev with Finland U21 in 2022

Personal information
- Full name: Adam Umarovich Markhiyev
- Date of birth: 17 March 2002 (age 24)
- Place of birth: Nazran, Russia
- Height: 1.83 m (6 ft 0 in)
- Position: Midfielder

Team information
- Current team: 1. FC Nürnberg
- Number: 6

Youth career
- 2009–2016: Jaro
- 2017–2019: HJK

Senior career*
Years	Team	Apps	(Gls)
2019–2020	Klubi 04	23	(2)
2021–2022	Spartaks Jūrmala	28	(2)
2022	→ SPAL (loan)	0	(0)
2023–2024	RFS	66	(3)
2025	Aris Limassol	16	(0)
2025–	1. FC Nürnberg	30	(4)

International career^{‡}
2018	Finland U16	3	(0)
2018–2019	Finland U17	12	(2)
2021–2025	Finland U21	26	(0)
2025–	Finland	14	(1)
Medal record
Representing Finland
Men's football
FIFA Series
Winner	2026 New Zealand
- * Club domestic league appearances and goals as of 6 September 2026 ‡ National team caps and goals as of 13 November 2026

Adam Umarovich Markhiyev (Russian: Адам Умарович Мархиев; born 17 March 2002) is a professional footballer who plays as a midfielder for 2. Bundesliga club 1. FC Nürnberg. Born in Russia, he represents the Finland national team.

== Early career ==
Markhiyev spent eight years in the youth sector of Jaro in Pietarsaari from 2009 to 2016, before joining the HJK Helsinki youth academy in 2017.

== Club career ==
=== Klubi 04 ===
Markhiyev made his senior debut with the HJK reserve team Klubi 04 in third-tier Kakkonen in 2019 season, and played for the team until early 2021, making 23 league appearances and scoring two goals in total.

=== Spartaks Jūrmala ===
Markhiyev moved to Latvia and joined Spartaks Jūrmala in 2021, where his father Umar Markhiyev had previously worked as an assistant coach to Aleksei Yeremenko Sr.

He was loaned out to Serie B club SPAL in the early 2022, but due to an injury, he didn't make an appearance for the first team and returned to Latvia after the season.

=== RFS ===
After Spartaks Jūrmala were relegated, Markhiyev moved to Riga and signed with RFS ahead of the 2023 season on a three-year deal with an option for an additional year, for an undisclosed fee. In his first season with the club, Markhiyev helped RFS to win the Latvian championship title. He also played with RFS in the 2023–24 UEFA Europa Conference League qualifying matches on four occasions.

Markhiyev represented RFS in the 2024–25 UEFA Europa League, helping his side to qualify for the league phase. On 23 January 2025, in a Europa League match against Ajax, Markhiyev scored the winning goal for RFS, in a 1–0 home win.

With RFS, Markhiyev won two Latvian championship titles in 2023 and 2024. They also won the Latvian Cup in 2024.

=== Aris Limassol ===
On 31 January 2025, Markhiyev signed a four-year contract with Cypriot First Division club Aris Limassol.

=== 1. FC Nürnberg ===
On 1 September 2025, Markhiyev signed with 2. Bundesliga club 1. FC Nürnberg. The transfer fee was reported to be €2.5 million. On 21 March 2026, Markhiyev scored his first goal for Nürnberg, in 3–0 home win over 1. FC Kaiserslautern.

== International career ==
Markhiyev is a regular Finnish youth international, having represented Finland at various youth national team levels. Since 2021, Markhiyev has played for the Finland under-21 national team. He made ten appearances in the 2025 UEFA European Under-21 Championship qualification campaign, helping Finland U21 to qualify for the final tournament, for the second time in the nation's history.

Markhiyev debuted with the Finland senior national team in September 2025 in a friendly match against Norway. He scored his first goal for the national team on 9 October, the winning goal in a 2–1 win over Lithuania at the Helsinki Olympic Stadium in the 2026 FIFA World Cup qualifiers.

== Personal life ==
Markhiyev was born in Nazran in the Russian republic of Ingushetia, but moved to Finland with his family when he was 7 years old. His father Umar Markhiyev is a Russian football coach and a former player, and his brother Muslim Markhiyev plays football in Finland for Gr.I.F.K. Markhiyev is a Muslim. Markhiyev family are very close friends with Aleksei Yeryomenko's family from Pietarsaari and Adam has named Roman Eremenko a big football idol of his.

== Career statistics ==
=== Club ===
As of 6 September 2026

Appearances and goals by club, season and competition
Club	Season	Division	League		National cup (Note: Includes Latvian Cup and DFB-Pokal)		League cup (Note: Includes Kakkonen Cup)		Europe		Other		Total	
Club	Season	Division	Apps	Goals	Apps	Goals	Apps	Goals	Apps	Goals	Apps	Goals	Apps	Goals
Klubi 04	2019	Kakkonen	9	1	0	0	1	0	—		—		10	1
Klubi 04	2020	Kakkonen	14	1	0	0	—		—		—		14	1
Klubi 04	Total		23	2	0	0	1	0	0	0	0	0	24	2
Spartaks Jūrmala	2021	Latvian Higher League	19	1	1	0	—		—		—		20	1
Spartaks Jūrmala	2022	Latvian Higher League	9	1	0	0	—		—		—		9	1
Spartaks Jūrmala	Total		28	2	1	0	0	0	0	0	0	0	29	2
SPAL (loan)	2021–22	Serie B	0	0	0	0	—		—		—		0	0
RFS	2023	Latvian Higher League	33	1	2	1	—		4 (Note: Includes UEFA Conference League)	0	—		39	2
RFS	2024	Latvian Higher League	33	2	1	0	–		16 (Note: Includes UEFA Champions League and UEFA Europa League)	1	1 (Note: Includes Latvian Supercup)	0	51	3
RFS	Total		66	3	3	1	1	0	20	1	1	0	90	5
Aris Limassol	2024–25	Cypriot First Division	14	0	–		—		—		—		14	0
Aris Limassol	2025–26	Cypriot First Division	2	0	0	0	–		3	0	–		5	0
Aris Limassol	Total		16	0	0	0	0	0	3	0	0	0	19	0
1. FC Nürnberg	2025–26	2. Bundesliga	26	1	–		–		–		–		26	1
1. FC Nürnberg	2026–27	2. Bundesliga	4	3	1	0	–		–		–		5	3
1. FC Nürnberg	Total		30	4	1	0	0	0	0	0	0	0	31	4
Career total			163	11	5	1	1	0	23	1	1	0	193	13

=== International ===
As of match played 12 November 2026

National team	Year	Competitive		Friendly		Total	
National team	Year	Apps	Goals	Apps	Goals	Apps	Goals
Finland	2025	3 (Note: Appearances in the 2026 FIFA World Cup qualification.)	1	2	0	5	1
Finland	2026	5 (Note: Appearances in the 2026–27 UEFA Nations League C.)	0	4 (Note: Includes two appearances in the 2026 FIFA Series.)	0	8	0
Total		8	1	6	0	14	1

Scores and results list Finland's goal tally first, score column indicates score after each Markhiyev goal.

List of international goals scored by Adam Markhiyev
No.	Date	Venue	Opponent	Score	Result	Competition
1	9 October 2025	Helsinki Olympic Stadium, Helsinki, Finland	Lithuania	2–1	2–1	2026 FIFA World Cup qualification

== Honours ==
Aris Limassol

- Cypriot First Division runner-up: 2024–25

RFS

- Latvian Higher League: 2023, 2024
- Latvian Cup: 2024
- Latvian Cup runner-up: 2023,
- Latvian Supercup runner-up: 2024

Klubi 04

- Kakkonen Group B: 2020

Finland

- FIFA Series: 2026
