= Roberts Savaļnieks =

Latvian footballer (born 1993)

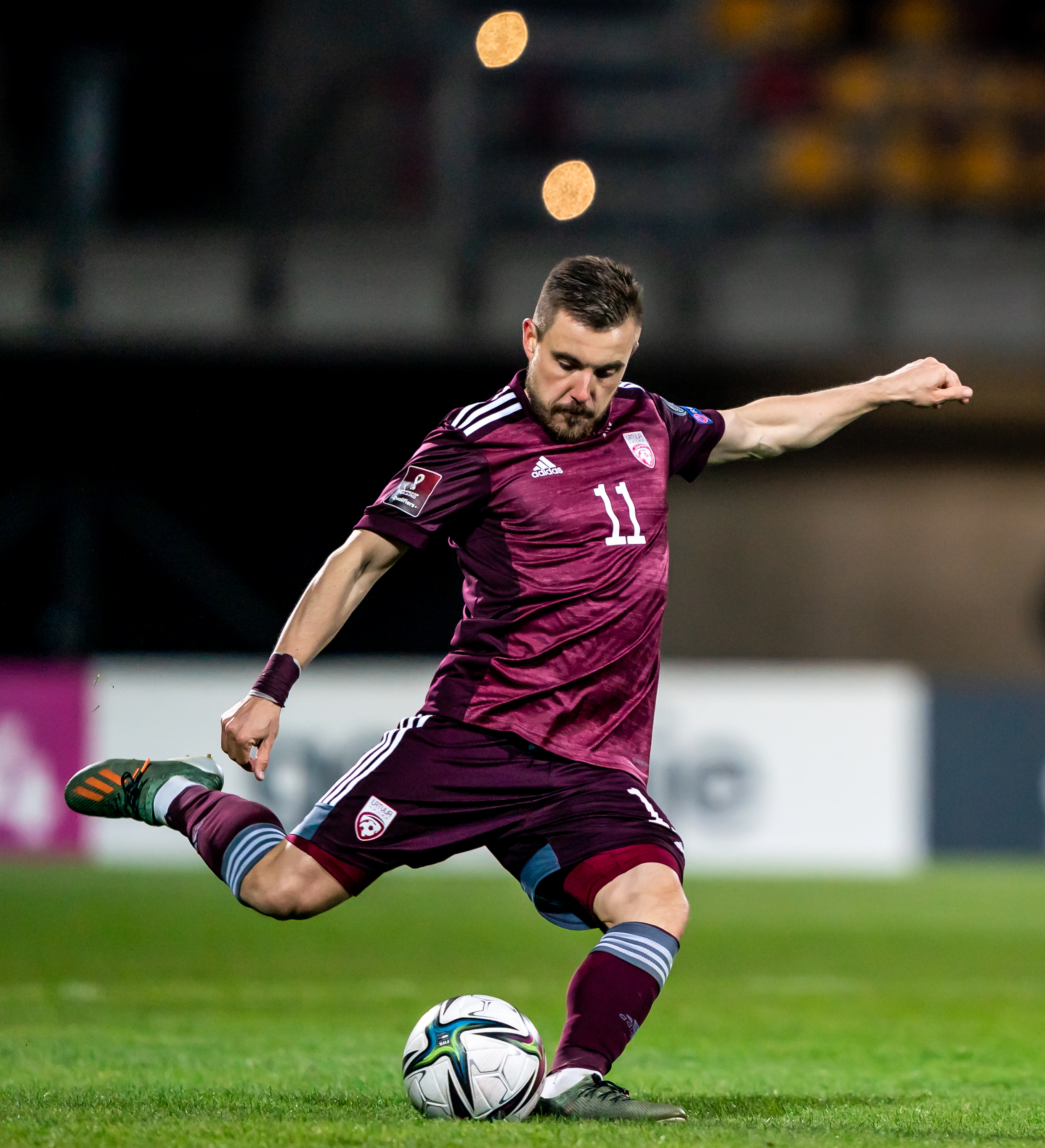
- Savaļnieks with Latvia in 2021

Personal information
- Full name: Roberts Savaļnieks
- Date of birth: 4 February 1993 (age 33)
- Place of birth: Valmiera, Latvia
- Height: 1.69 m (5 ft 7 in)
- Position: Midfielder

Team information
- Current team: RFS
- Number: 11

Youth career
- Liepājas Metalurgs-2

Senior career*
Years	Team	Apps	(Gls)
2009–2013	Liepājas Metalurgs	80	(5)
2014	Jagiellonia Białystok	3	(0)
2014	Jagiellonia Białystok II	12	(5)
2014–2015	Liepāja	22	(3)
2016	Riga FC	22	(5)
2017–2021	RFS	125	(8)
2022	Liepāja	33	(0)
2023–	RFS	120	(8)

International career^{‡}
2009	Latvia U17	3	(0)
2011	Latvia U18	4	(0)
2011	Latvia U19	3	(0)
2012–2014	Latvia U21	11	(2)
2016–	Latvia	79	(2)
- * Club domestic league appearances and goals as of 12 November 2026 ‡ National team caps and goals as of 17:45, 15 November 2026 (UTC)

Roberts Savaļnieks (born 4 February 1993 in Valmiera) is a Latvian professional footballer who plays for Latvian Higher League club RFS and the Latvia national team.

== Club career ==
Originally, from Valmiera, Savaļnieks moved to Liepāja at an early age to train and play for the youth teams of Liepājas Metalurgs. He was taken to the first team in 2009, and with the playing time gradually growing, Savaļnieks became a first eleven player in 2012. Over the period of five consecutive seasons with the club he participated in 80 league matches and scored five goals, as well as played in the UEFA Champions League and UEFA Europa League.

In January 2014, Savaļnieks went on trial with the Polish Ekstraklasa club Jagiellonia Białystok and signed a contract with them for half-a-year with an option to extend it for two more years. He made his debut for the club on 16 February 2014, coming on as a substitute in a 1-0 league defeat to Ruch Chorzów. In June 2014, having played three league and one cup match, it was revealed that Jagiellonia would not extend Savaļnieks' contract.

In July 2014, he returned to the Latvian Higher League and joined the newly established FK Liepāja. With 11 appearances and 2 goals in the remaining part of the season, he helped the club finish the league in the top four.

After winning the Virsliga with Liepāja, in 2015 Savaļnieks joined Riga FC.

== International career ==
Savaļnieks was a member of Latvia U18, Latvia U19 and Latvia U21 football teams. On 25 February 2014, Savaļnieks received his first call-up to the senior national team for the following friendly match against Republic of Macedonia on 5 March 2014. He remained an unused substitute throughout the match.

== Career statistics ==
=== International ===
As of match played 15 November 2026

Appearances and goals by national team and year
National team	Year	Apps	Goals
Latvia
Latvia	2016	4	0
Latvia	2017	1	0
Latvia	2018	7	0
Latvia	2019	8	0
Latvia	2020	6	0
Latvia	2021	12	1
Latvia	2022	9	1
Latvia	2023	9	0
Latvia	2024	9	0
Latvia	2025	7	0
Latvia	2026	7	0
Total		79	2

Scores and results list Latvia's goal tally first, score column indicates score after each Savaļnieks goal.

List of international goals scored by Roberts Savaļnieks
No.	Date	Venue	Opponent	Score	Result	Competition
1	30 March 2021	Atatürk Olympic Stadium, Istanbul, Turkey	Turkey	1–2	3–3	2022 FIFA World Cup qualification
2	25 March 2022	National Stadium, Ta' Qali, Malta	Kuwait	1–1	1–1	Friendly

== Honours ==
Liepājas Metalurgs

- Latvian Higher League: 2009

Liepāja

- Latvian Higher League: 2015

RFS

- Latvian Higher League: 2021, 2023, 2024, 2026
- Latvian Cup: 2019, 2021, 2024
- Latvian Supercup: 2025

Latvia

- Baltic Cup: 2016, 2018
