= Umar Markhiyev =

Indian footballer and coach (born 1969)

Personal information
- Full name: Umar Magometovich Markhiyev
- Date of birth: 12 January 1969 (age 57)
- Place of birth: Grozny, Russian SFSR, Soviet Union
- Height: 1.78 m (5 ft 10 in)
- Position: Defender

Team information
- Current team: Angusht Nazran (manager)

Senior career*
Years	Team	Apps	(Gls)
1992–1994	Erzu Grozny	62	(1)
1995–1997	Uralan Elista	71	(1)
1998–1999	Angusht Nazran	18	(0)
Total		151	(2)

Managerial career
- 2000–2001: Angusht Nazran
- 2004–2006: Angusht Nazran
- 2009: Angusht Nazran
- 2011–2016: Jaro (assistant)
- 2017: Angusht Nazran
- 2017: Pyunik (assistant)
- 2018–2019: SJK (assistant)
- 2020: Spartaks Jūrmala (assistant)
- 2024–: Angusht Nazran
- * Club domestic league appearances and goals

Umar Magometovich Markhiyev (Russian: Умар Магометович Мархиев; born 12 January 1969) is a Russian professional football coach and a former player who is the manager of Angusht Nazran.

== Club career ==
He made his Russian Football National League debut for Erzu Grozny on 3 April 1993 in a game against Druzhba Maykop. He played 5 seasons in the FNL for Erzu and Uralan Elista.

== Personal life ==
His sons Adam Markhiyev and Muslim Markhiyev are also footballers, playing for 1. FC Nürnberg and Kiffen, respectively.
