= Emerson Deocleciano =

Brazilian footballer (born 1999)

Personal information
- Full name: Emerson Santana Deocleciano
- Date of birth: 27 July 1999 (age 27)
- Place of birth: Prado Bahia, Brazil
- Height: 1.76 m (5 ft 9 in)
- Position: Forward

Team information
- Current team: V-Varen Nagasaki
- Number: 16

Youth career
- –2018: Vila Nova

Senior career*
Years	Team	Apps	(Gls)
2018–2019	Vila Nova	3	(0)
2019	→ Lokomotiva (loan)	3	(0)
2020–2021	Lokomotiva	6	(0)
2020	→ RFS (loan)	24	(10)
2021–2024	RFS	136	(46)
2025–	V-Varen Nagasaki	10	(0)
- * Club domestic league appearances and goals as of 11 August 2026

Emerson Santana Deocleciano (born 27 July 1999), sometimes known as Baiano, is a Brazilian professional footballer who plays as a forward for J1 League club, V-Varen Nagasaki.

== Career ==
Deocleciano started his career with Vila Nova, playing for them in the Campeonato Goiano in 2018.

In June 2019, he joined Croatian First Football League side NK Lokomotiva on an initial one-year loan deal. On 4 August 2019, he made his professional debut as a substitute in a 3–0 loss to Hajduk Split.

Deocleciano's deal with Lokomotiva was later made permanent and in February 2020, he was loaned out to Virsliga side Rīgas FS. Deocleciano was announce official permanent transfer to RFS for 2021 season.

On 10 January 2025, Deocleciano abroad to Japan for the first time and signed to J2 club, V-Varen Nagasaki for 2025 season.

== Career statistics ==
=== Club ===
As of the start from 2025 season.

Appearances and goals by club, season and competition
Club	Season	League			Cup		League Cup		Continental		Other		Total	
Club	Season	Division	Apps	Goals	Apps	Goals	Apps	Goals	Apps	Goals	Apps	Goals	Apps	Goals
Vila Nova	2018	Série B	0	0	0	0	—		—		3 (Note: Appearances in Campeonato Goiano)	0	3	0
NK Lokomotiva	2019–20	Prva HNL	3	0	1	0	—		—		0	0	4	0
NK Lokomotiva	2020–21	Prva HNL	3	0	0	0	—		—		0	0	3	0
FK RFS	2020	Virsliga	24	10	3	1	—		1 (Note: Appearances in Europa League)	0	0	0	28	11
FK RFS	2021	Virsliga	26	9	2	0	—		6 (Note: Appearances in Conference League)	2	0	0	34	11
FK RFS	2022	Virsliga	35	11	4	1	—		11	0	0	0	50	12
FK RFS	2023	Virsliga	30	9	3	2	—		4	0	0	0	37	11
FK RFS	2024	Virsliga	23	7	1	0	—		5	1	0	0	29	8
V-Varen Nagasaki	2025	J2 League	0	0	0	0	0 (Note: Appearances in J.League Cup)	0	—		0	0	0	0
Career total			142	46	14	4	0	0	27	3	3	0	186	53

== Honours ==
FK RFS

- Virsliga: 2021, 2023, 2024
- Latvian Football Cup: 2021, 2024
