= Herdi Prenga =

Albanian-Croatian footballer (born 1994)

Personal information
- Full name: Herdi Besnik Prenga
- Date of birth: 31 August 1994 (age 32)
- Place of birth: Zadar, Croatia
- Height: 1.90 m (6 ft 3 in)
- Position: Centre-back

Team information
- Current team: RFS
- Number: 23

Youth career
- 2004–2013: Dinamo Zagreb

Senior career*
Years	Team	Apps	(Gls)
2013–2015	Dinamo Zagreb	0	(0)
2013	→ Sesvete (loan)	17	(1)
2014–2015	→ Lokomotiva (loan)	38	(1)
2015–2016	Lokomotiva	28	(1)
2017–2018	Inter Zaprešić	30	(1)
2019–2021	Riga	51	(5)
2021–2022	Kisvárda	37	(1)
2022–2023	Honvéd Budapest	30	(3)
2023–	RFS	86	(7)

International career
2009	Croatia U15	2	(0)
2009–2010	Croatia U16	6	(0)
2010–2011	Croatia U17	9	(0)
2012	Croatia U18	6	(0)
2012–2013	Croatia U19	4	(0)
2014	Croatia U21	1	(0)
2015–2016	Albania U21	8	(1)
2018	Albania	2	(0)
- * Club domestic league appearances and goals as of 12 November 2026

Herdi Besnik Prenga (born 31 August 1994) is a professional footballer who plays as a centre-back for Latvian Higher League club RFS. Born in Croatia, he represented Albania internationally.

== Early life and youth career ==
Herdi Prenga was born in Zadar, Croatia to parents of Albanian descent. His father Besnik is a former Albanian international footballer in years 1992–1994. He started his youth career at GNK Dinamo Zagreb Academy. In 2013, he became professional as he gained entry with the first team of GNK Dinamo Zagreb.

== Club career ==
=== Sesvete ===
In Summer 2013 Prenga was loaned out for 6 months to NK Sesvete in Druga HNL (2. HNL) for the first half of the 2013–14 season.

==== 2013–14 season ====
He made it his first senior debut with Sesvete on 17 August 2013 playing full 90-minutes in the opening match against Gorica, finished in a clean 3–0 victory. He scored 1 goal during the season, concretely on 28 September 2013 in the 8th game week against Solin finished in the 2–0 victory where Prenga scored the opening goal in the 17th minute. He became a regular and important player for the team as he played in total 17 matches out 19 all full 90-minutes and missed out just 2 matches due to the suspension for completing the number of yellow cards (3) exactly two times as he received in total 6 yellow cards.

=== Lokomotiva Zagreb ===
==== 2013–14 season second-half ====
For the second half of the 2013–14 season, also another full season (in total for 1 year and a half), Prenga was loaned to Lokomotiva Zagreb this time in the major Prva HNL. He made it his professional debut with Lokomotiva Zagreb on 22 February 2014 against Hajduk Split coming on as a substitute in the 23rd minute in place of Dino Perić and the match finished in the 0–2 loss. Then until the end the season he played 9 other matches all as a full 90-minutes and was as an unused substitute for 4 matches.

=== Inter Zaprešić ===
On 3 July 2017 Prenga signed with fellow Croatian First League side Inter Zaprešić among Marko Bencun and Tomislav Haramustek. Prenga was unable to play in two first games of the season due to a leg injury. He was an unused substitute in next match against Slaven Belupo on 29 July 2017. He made his debut a week later on 5 August against Rudeš playing the full 90-minutes match to help his team to take a clear away 0–2 victory.

=== Riga FC ===
On 19 February 2019, Prenga joined Riga FC in the Latvian Higher League on a contract until the end of 2020.

=== Kisvárda FC ===
On 28 January 2021, after his contract with Riga expired, Prenga signed for Kisvárda FC in the Hungarian National Championship.

== International career ==
=== Croatia ===
Prenga first was called up at the Croatia national under-17 football team to participate in the 2011 UEFA European Under-17 Championship elite round. He played every minute in the entire tournament.

He was called up by the coach Dinko Jeličić at Croatia national under-19 football team to participate in the 2013 UEFA European Under-19 Championship elite qualification. In the tournament Prenga played just one match against Poland on 7 June 2013, where he played as a starter and got substituted off in the 60th minute for Tomislav Kiš as the match finished in the 2–0 victory.

Prenga was called up once at Croatia national under-21 football team by the coach Nenad Gračan for the match valid for the 2015 UEFA European Under-21 Championship qualification against Latvia on 3 September 2014, where he remained on the bench for the entire match.

=== Albania ===
In January 2015 Prenga declared to the Albanian media that he wish to continue his father's (Besnik Prenga) footsteps to wear red and black shirt of Albania and that it would be great honor for him. Given this, the Albania national under-21 football team coach Skënder Gega contacted the 20-year-old and his family. In February then, coach Skënder Gega announced to have sent an invitation to Prenga, declaring that he has seen him as a good reinforcement for the Albania U21 squad.

==== 2017 UEFA European Under-21 Championship qualification ====
Prenga received his first official call-up by coach Skënder Gega for the 2017 UEFA European Under-21 Championship qualification opening match against Liechtenstein on 28 March 2015. However Prenga couldn't play in this match as he was ineligible due to the absence of respective documents.

Prenga was called up by a new appointed coach at the Albania U21, Redi Jupi, for the 2017 UEFA European Under-21 Championship qualification matches against Israel & Portugal on 3 & 8 September 2015. He made it his first competitive debut for Albania U21 on 3 September 2015 in a 2017 UEFA European Under-21 Championship qualification match against Israel playing the full 90-minutes match, which finished in the 1–1 draw. Prenga played another full 90-minutes match against Portugal 5 days later but unable to avoid a 1–6 defeat.

He scored his first international goal for Albania U21 on 28 March 2016 against Hungary U21 to give his side the important 2–1 victory in the 2017 UEFA European Under-21 Championship qualification. Prenga made his debut for the senior Albania national football team in a 1–0 UEFA Nations League win over Israel on 7 September 2018.

== Career statistics ==
=== Club ===
As of 3 November 2017

Club statistics
Club	Season	League			Cup		Europe (Note: Including continental competitions, such as UEFA Champions League and UEFA Europa League)		Other		Total	
Club	Season	Division	Apps	Goals	Apps	Goals	Apps	Goals	Apps	Goals	Apps	Goals
Sesvete	2013–14	Druga HNL	17	1	—		—		—		17	1
Lokomotiva Zagreb	2013–14	Croatian First League	10	0	—		—		—		10	0
Lokomotiva Zagreb	2014–15	Croatian First League	28	1	4	0	—		—		32	1
Lokomotiva Zagreb	2015–16	Croatian First League	26	1	3	0	2	0	—		31	1
Lokomotiva Zagreb	2016–17	Croatian First League	2	0	—		4	2	—		6	2
Lokomotiva Zagreb	Total		66	2	7	0	6	2	—		79	4
Inter Zaprešić	2017–18	Croatian First League	4	0	—		—		—		4	0
Career total			87	3	7	0	6	2	—		100	5

== Honours ==
RFS

- Latvian Higher League: 2026
