= Žiga Lipušček =

Slovenian footballer (born 1997)

Personal information
- Date of birth: 5 January 1997 (age 29)
- Place of birth: Šempeter pri Gorici, Slovenia
- Height: 1.99 m (6 ft 6 in)
- Position: Defender

Team information
- Current team: RFS
- Number: 43

Youth career
- –2013: Gorica
- 2013–2016: Maribor

Senior career*
| Years | Team | Apps | (Gls) |
| 2016–2017 | Maribor B | 28 | (4) |
| 2017–2020 | Gorica | 60 | (8) |
| 2020– | RFS | 196 | (39) |

International career
| 2013 | Slovenia U16 | 1 | (0) |
| 2015 | Slovenia U19 | 1 | (0) |
| 2017–2018 | Slovenia U21 | 7 | (1) |
- * Club domestic league appearances and goals as of 12 November 2026

Žiga Lipušček (born 5 January 1997) is a Slovenian professional footballer who plays as a defender for Latvian Higher League club RFS.

== Personal life ==
In August 2016, Lipušček was involved in a traffic accident in which two of his teammates from Maribor B died. Lipušček, however, suffered only minor injuries.

== Honours ==
RFS

- Latvian Higher League: 2021, 2023, 2024, 2026
