= Mārtiņš Ķigurs =

Latvian footballer (born 1997)

Personal information
- Date of birth: 31 March 1997 (age 29)
- Place of birth: Latvia
- Height: 1.83 m (6 ft 0 in)
- Position: Midfielder

Team information
- Current team: RFS
- Number: 49

Senior career*
Years	Team	Apps	(Gls)
2017–2023	Liepāja	96	(11)
2024–	RFS	61	(10)

International career^{‡}
2017–2018	Latvia U21	6	(1)
2019–	Latvia	17	(0)
- * Club domestic league appearances and goals as of 12 November 2026 ‡ National team caps and goals as of 20:13, 9 November 2026 (UTC)

Mārtiņš Ķigurs (born 31 March 1997) is a Latvian professional footballer who plays as a midfielder for RFS and the Latvia national team.

== Career ==
Ķigurs made his international debut for Latvia on 9 September 2019 in a UEFA Euro 2020 qualifying match against North Macedonia, which finished as a 0–2 away loss.

== Career statistics ==
=== International ===
As of match played 9 June 2026

Appearances and goals by national team and year
National team	Year	Apps	Goals
Latvia
Latvia	2019	3	0
Latvia	2020	6	0
Latvia	2021	4	0
Latvia	2022	0	0
Latvia	2023	0	0
Latvia	2024	2	0
Latvia	2025	0	0
Latvia	2026	2	0
Total		17	0

== Honours ==
RFS

- Latvian Higher League: 2026
