= Petr Mareš =

Czech footballer (born 1991)

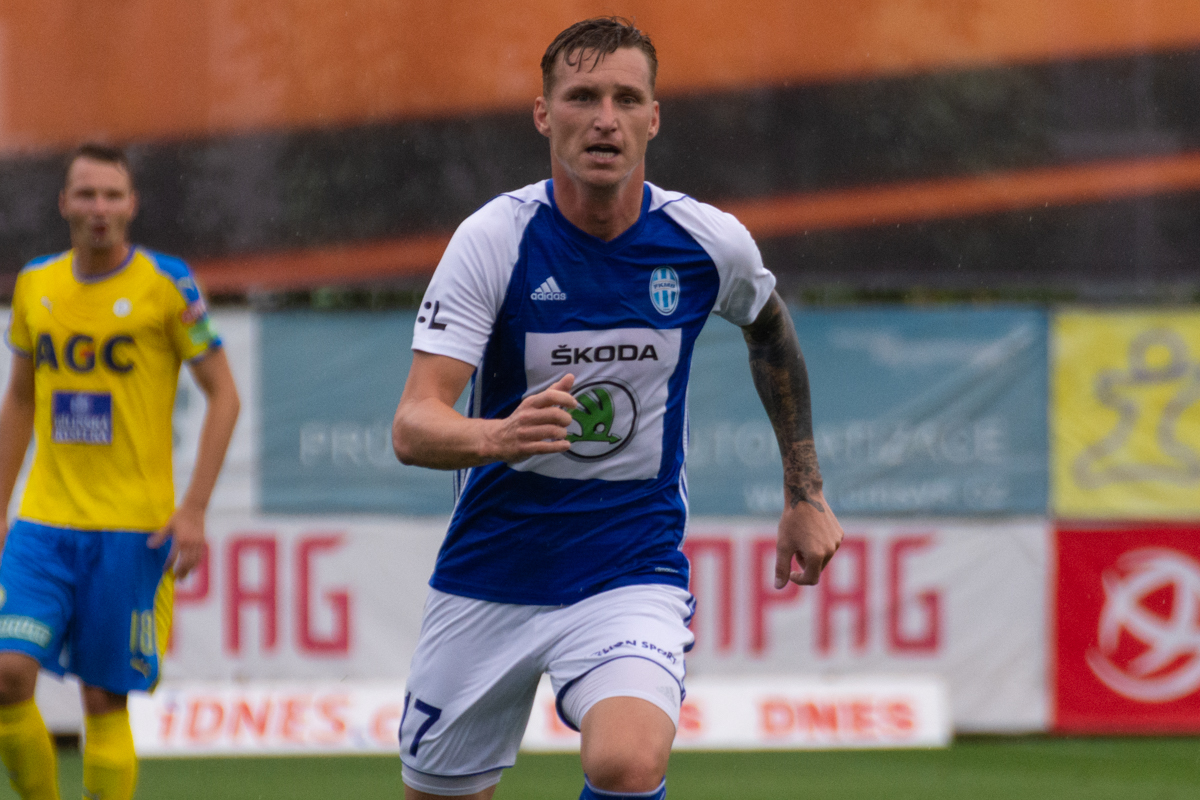

Personal information
- Date of birth: 17 January 1991 (age 35)
- Place of birth: Planá, Czechoslovakia
- Height: 1.83 m (6 ft 0 in)
- Position: Defender

Team information
- Current team: Viktoria Žižkov
- Number: 9

Youth career
- 2000–2009: Slavia Prague

Senior career*
Years	Team	Apps	(Gls)
2009–2012	Slavia Prague	1	(0)
2010	→ Hlučín (loan)	12	(2)
2011	→ Vlašim (loan)	15	(1)
2012–2014	Viktoria Žižkov	46	(5)
2014–2016	Hradec Králové	45	(6)
2016–2020	Mladá Boleslav	67	(5)
2019–2020	→ Teplice (loan)	22	(2)
2021–2026	FK RFS	147	(22)
2026	Zbrojovka Brno	3	(0)
2026–	Viktoria Žižkov	0	(0)

International career
2006–2007	Czech Republic U16	9	(2)
2007	Czech Republic U17	5	(1)
2008	Czech Republic U18	1	(0)
2010	Czech Republic U19	2	(0)
2016–	Czech Republic	3	(0)
- * Club domestic league appearances and goals as of 28 May 2026

Petr Mareš (born 17 January 1991) is a Czech footballer who plays as a defender for Czech National Football League club Viktoria Žižkov. In 2016, he debuted for the Czech senior squad during a match against Denmark.

On 6 January 2026, Mareš signed a half-year contract with Zbrojovka Brno.

On 3 September 2026, Mareš signed a contract with Czech National Football League club Viktoria Žižkov.

== Honours ==
Individual

- Latvian Higher League Top assist: 2025
