= Daniels Balodis =

Latvian footballer (born 1998)

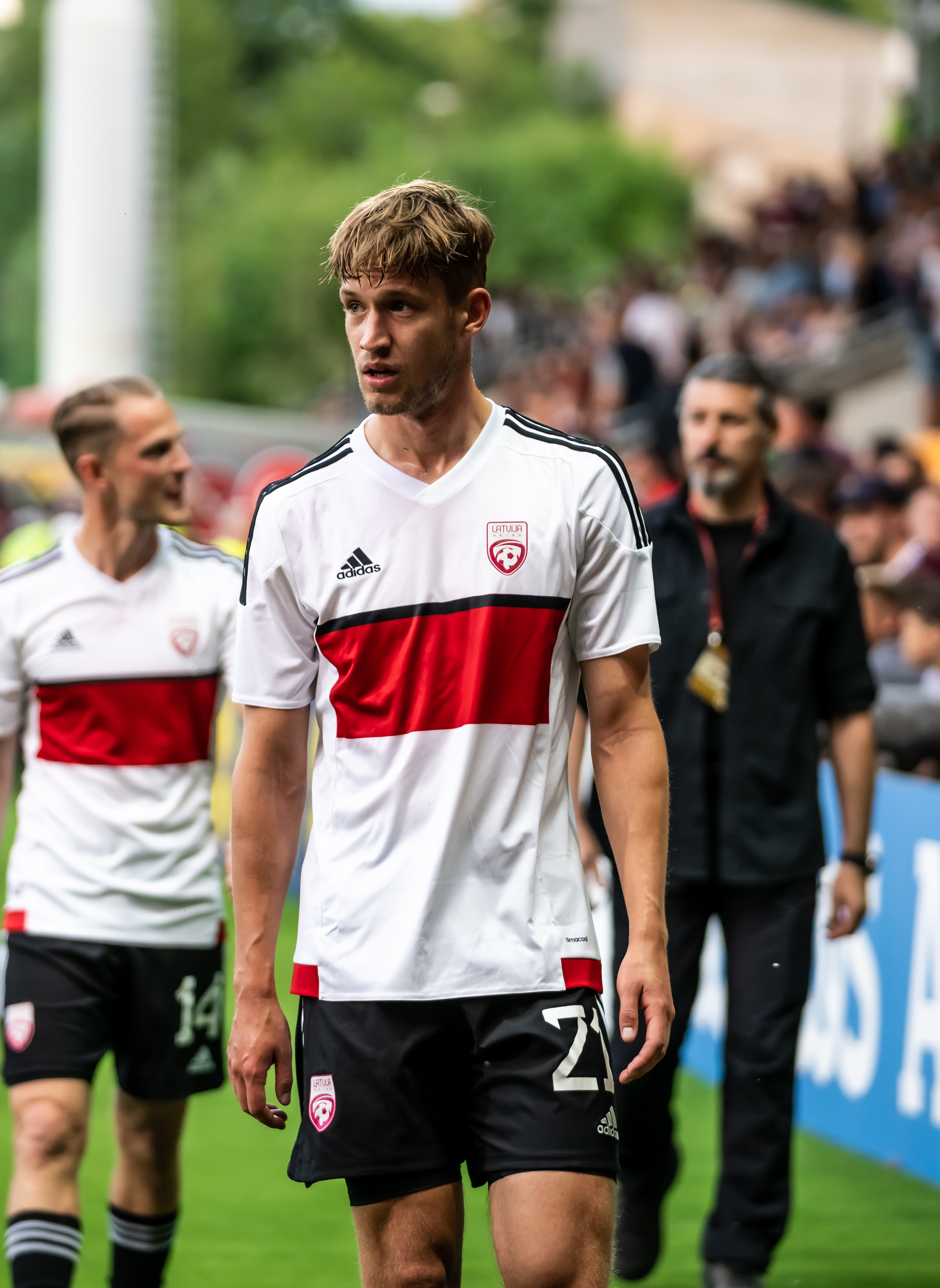

Personal information
- Full name: Daniels Balodis
- Date of birth: 10 June 1998 (age 28)
- Place of birth: Riga, Latvia
- Height: 1.88 m (6 ft 2 in)
- Position: Defender

Team information
- Current team: Auda
- Number: 3

Youth career
- Skonto FC

Senior career*
Years	Team	Apps	(Gls)
2016-2017	Skonto FC		
2018	FK RFS	2	(0)
2019	→ BFC Daugavpils (loan)	27	(2)
2020	→ FK Jelgava	7	(0)
2020–2024	Valmiera	118	(6)
2024–2025	FK RFS	10	(0)
2025	St Johnstone	13	(2)
2025–2026	Tatran Prešov	16	(0)
2026–	Auda	10	(0)

International career^{‡}
2014	Latvia U19	2	(0)
2014–2015	Latvia U19	7	(0)
2015–2016	Latvia U19	16	(0)
2019–2020	Latvia U21	13	(2)
2022–	Latvia	29	(1)
- * Club domestic league appearances and goals as of 12 November 2026 ‡ National team caps and goals as of 18 November 2026

Daniels Balodis (born 10 June 1998) is a Latvian footballer who plays as a defender for Auda and the Latvia national team.

== Club career ==
At the age of 20 years-old, Balodis made his debut in the Virsliga for RFS. However, after only making two league appearances he continued his career at Daugavpils and then FK Jelgava.

He won the Latvian championship with Valmiera FC in the 2022 season, having joined the club in 2020. On 4 July 2024, Balodis was announced as returning to RFS, signing for an undisclosed fee. Just 6 days later, on 10 July 2024, Balodis scored a header against Larne of Northern Ireland in a 3–0 home victory in the first qualifying round of the 2024–25 UEFA Champions League. On 30 October 2024, he scored a late equaliser as RFS came back from 2–0 down in the final of the Latvian Cup against FK Auda to take the match to extra time, and eventually win the title.

He signed for Scottish Premiership club St Johnstone on 28 January 2025 on an 18-month contract. He made his debut for St Johnstone on 8 February 2025 in the Scottish Cup in a 1–0 home win against Hamilton Academical. He made his Scottish Premiership debut the following week away against Kilmarnock. On 6 April 2025, he scored the only goal of the game with a fourth-minute header from a Graham Carey free-kick as St Johnstone inflicted a surprise 1–0 defeat against runaway leaders Celtic who had been looking for a win to secure the Scottish league title.

== International career ==
Balodis made his international debut for Latvia on 16 November 2022 in the 2022 Baltic Cup against Estonia. He scored his first international goal for Latvia on 12 October 2023 in a 2–0 home win against Armenia in a qualifying match for the 2024 UEFA European Championship.

=== International goal ===
Scores and results list Latvia's goal tally first.

No	Date	Venue	Opponent	Score	Result	Competition
1.	12 October 2023	Skonto Stadium, Riga, Latvia	Armenia	2–0	2–0	Euro 2024 qualifier

== Career statistics ==
=== International ===
Latvia
Year	Apps	Goals
2022	2	0
2023	7	1
2024	6	0
2025	9	0
2026	5	0
Total	29	1
