= 2024 Latvian Football Cup =

Football competition held in Latvia

Tournament details
- Country: Latvia
- Teams: 50

Final positions
- Champions: RFS
- Runners-up: Auda

The 2024 Latvian Football Cup, known as the "11.lv Latvian Cup" for sponsorship reasons, was the 30th edition of Latvia's national football cup. The tournament was held in single elimination matches. The winners qualified for the 2025–26 Conference League second qualifying round. A total of 50 teams played in this year. Riga were the defending champions.

RFS won the cup (their third Latvian Football Cup win), defeating Auda 4–2 (in extra time) in the final. Since they qualified for the Conference League based on league position, the Conference League spot for winning the cup was passed to the second-placed team in the 2024 Latvian Higher League.

== Preliminary round ==
The draw was made on 18 April 2024. The matches was played on 4–5 May 2024.

Team 1	Score	Team 2
4 May 2024
Union	0–2	Beitar/Riga Mariners
5 May 2024
Staiceles Bebri	3–2	Viola

== First round ==
The draw was made on the same day as a preliminary round. The matches was played on 16–19 May 2024.

Team 1	Score	Team 2
16 May 2024
Bauskas BJSS/Mēmele	4–0	Alberts
17 May 2024
Sports United/Cēsis	0–12	Rīgas Futbola Skola
DVSK Traktors	1–2	Pļaviņas DM
Lielupe	5–1	Valka
18 May 2024
Aliance	20–0	Limbaži
Madona/BJSS	4–2 (a.e.t.)	Kuldīgas/Goldingen United
Beitar/Riga Mariners	4–1	RSU
Talsi	3–4 (a.e.t.)	Ķekava-Auda
Sigulda	0–5	Parks
Dinamo Riga	1–3	Iecava
19 May 2024
Upesciema Warriors	3–1	Staiceles Bebri
Salaspils	7–2	Līvāni
Jules Verne	2–2 (a.e.t.) (2–4 p)	Cēsis
Riga United	3–2 (a.e.t.)	Kadaga/Ostas

== Second round ==
The 14 first round winners and ten teams in Tier 2 entered a second round.The draw was made on 20 May 2024. The matches are scheduled in 1–2 June 2024.

Team 1	Score	Team 2
29 May 2024
Parks	2–0	Riga United
31 May 2024
Leevon PPK	4–0	Upesciema Warriors
1 June 2024
Ogre United	2–7	Mārupes
Pļaviņas DM	0–5	Ķekava-Auda
Skanstes	6–1	Salaspils
2 June 2024
Madona/BJSS	0–6	Smiltene/BJSS
Lielupe	1–2	Rīgas Futbola Skola
JDFS Alberts	5–0	Bauskas BJSS/Mēmele
Rēzekne	5–0	Cēsis
Super Nova	1–2	JFK Ventspils
AFA Olaine	3–0	Aliance
Iecava	1–3	Beitar/Riga Mariners

== Play-off round ==
The twelve second round winners entered a play-off round. The draw was made on the 6 June 2024 The matches are scheduled in 21–24 June 2024.

Team 1	Score	Team 2
21 June 2024
Rīgas Futbola Skola	1–2 (a.e.t.)	JFK Ventspils
Rēzekne	1–5	AFA Olaine
Leevon PPK	1–1 (a.e.t.) (5–4 p)	Skanstes
22 June 2024
Ķekava-Auda	3–3 (a.e.t.) (2–4 p)	JDFS Alberts
Parks	0–5	Beitar/Riga Mariners
Mārupes	3–1	Smiltene/BJSS

== Round of 16 ==
The six play-off round winners and ten teams in Tier 1 entered the Round of 16. The draw was made on the 26 June 2024 The matches are scheduled in 13–14 July 2024.

Team 1	Score	Team 2
12 July 2024
Leevon PPK	2–1	Grobiņas
13 July 2024
Mārupes	1–4	Auda
Beitar/Riga Mariners	0–4	Metta
JFK Ventspils	0–3	Riga
JDFS Alberts	1–2	AFA Olaine
RFS	2–1	Daugavpils
14 July 2024
Jelgava	2–4	Liepāja
Tukums 2000/Telms	2–3	Valmiera

== Quarter-finals ==
The eight Round of 16 winners entered the quarter-finals. The draw was made on the 15 July 2024 The quarter-final matches were scheduled for mid-August 2024.

Team 1	Score	Team 2
17 August 2024
Valmiera	3–4	RFS
Liepāja	1–0	AFA Olaine
18 August 2024
Leevon PPK	0–4	Riga
19 August 2024
Metta	1–1 (2–4 p)	Auda

== Semi-finals ==
The four quarter-final winners entered the semi-finals.

Team 1	Score	Team 2
24 September 2024
Auda	3–0	Liepāja
RFS	2–1	Riga

== Final ==
The final was held between the two semi-final winners.

30 October 2024
19:45

RFS	4–2 (a.e.t.)	Auda
Ošs 45+2'; Balodis 84'; Ndjiki 109'; Panić 120+4'	Report lff.lv report	8' Tavares; 18' Gaye

LNK Sporta Parks, Riga
Attendance: 1,699
Referee: Aleksandrs Golubevs

== See also ==
- 2024 Latvian Higher League
