= Ismaël Diomandé (footballer, born 2003) =

Ivorian footballer (born 2003)

Personal information
- Full name: Ismaël Diomandé
- Date of birth: 7 December 2003 (age 22)
- Place of birth: Ivory Coast
- Position: Midfielder

Team information
- Current team: RFS
- Number: 7

Senior career*
| Years | Team | Apps | (Gls) |
- AFAD Djékanou
| 2022– | RFS | 76 | (31) |
| 2022 | → Pohronie (loan) | 2 | (0) |
| 2023 | → Daugavpils (loan) | 9 | (4) |
- * Club domestic league appearances and goals as of 12 November 2026

Ismaël Diomandé (born 7 December 2003) is an Ivorian professional footballer who plays as a midfielder for Latvian Higher League club RFS.

== Career ==
=== FK Pohronie ===
Diomandé joined Pohronie in late February 2022 on a loan deal from Rigas Futbola skola. He made his Fortuna Liga debut for the Žiar nad Hronom-based club on 26 February 2022 in an away 1–0 defeat at pod Čebraťom against Ružomberok. Diomandé came on as a substitute for Filip Hašek as a right midfielder. While on the pitch, he witnessed the match's only goal by Filip Lichý, which sealed the 1–0 victory for Ružomberok. He also made an appearance in a home 0–1 defeat to ViOn Zlaté Moravce on 5 March 2022, when he was a substitute for the former Slovak international Martin Chrien in the second half.

On 8 March 2022, RFS announced that Diomandé was recalled from his loan.

== Honours ==
RFS

- Latvian Higher League: 2026
