= Stefan Panić =

Serbian footballer (born 1992)

Personal information
- Date of birth: 20 September 1992 (age 34)
- Place of birth: Topola, FR Yugoslavia
- Height: 1.93 m (6 ft 4 in)
- Position: Defensive midfielder

Team information
- Current team: RFS
- Number: 26

Senior career*
Years	Team	Apps	(Gls)
2010	Mladenovac	11	(0)
2011	Nacional	0	(0)
2011	Mladenovac	1	(0)
2012	Kovačevac	27	(1)
2013–2017	Metalac Gornji Milanovac	117	(11)
2017	Baník Ostrava	5	(0)
2018	Javor Ivanjica	14	(2)
2018–2020	Riga	58	(8)
2021–2022	Pafos	47	(3)
2022–	RFS	147	(35)

International career^{‡}
2017	Serbia	1	(0)
- * Club domestic league appearances and goals as of 12 November 2026 ‡ National team caps and goals as of 30 January 2017

Stefan Panić (Serbian Cyrillic: Стефан Панић; born 20 September 1992) is a Serbian professional footballer who plays as a defensive midfielder for RFS in Latvia.

== Club career ==
=== Early years ===
Born in Topola, Panić started his career in Mladenovac. Playing for the club with same name, he made 12 appearances from 2010 to 2011, and also spent a period in Portugal with C.D. Nacional in the meantime. In 2012, Panić was with Kovačevac. Playing for that club, he made 27 appearances, and scored 1 goal in the Serbian League Belgrade. He also played 1 cup match against Hajduk Kula, previously won the Belgrade Cup, and also was a scorer in the final of that competition.

=== Metalac Gornji Milanovac ===
Panić joined Metalac Gornji Milanovac for the second half of the 2012–13 season. He made 2 appearances until the end of season. After adapting period, he spent mostly on the bench, or out of 18 players, he next season very well, and became constant in starting 11. He also played some matches in defence, as a centre-back. He played 25 league appearances, and one cup match, against Partizan, and scored 3 goals. He was a member of play-off match, against Rad, played in Gornji Milanovac. He missed only one match in the 2014–15 Serbian First League, because of yellow card suspension, he scored 3 league goals, as the previous season, he also made 2 cup appearances and 2 play-off match against Napredak Kruševac, after which Metalac promoted in the Serbian SuperLiga. He made his SuperLiga debut in the first fixture of 2015–16 season. Panić scored his first SuperLiga goal for Metalac in the 20th fixture, against Novi Pazar. In January 2016, Panić signed new contract with Metalac. On 26 November 2016, Panić scored a goal against Red Star Belgrade in his 100th league match for Metalac.

=== Baník Ostrava ===
In summer 2017, Panić signed a two-year deal with Baník Ostrava. He made his debut for new club in the first fixture of the 2017–18 Czech First League season, replacing Tomáš Poznar in 86 minute of the match against Zbrojovka Brno.

== International career ==
In January 2017, Panić was elected in a group of players from the Serbian football competition for a friendly match in San Diego, where he made his debut for the National team in a 0–0 draw against the United States. In May 2018, Panić was overlooked after the club's disappointing season from Serbia's 23-man squad for the 2018 FIFA World Cup in Russia.

== Career statistics ==
=== Club ===
As of 2 August 2017

Appearances and goals by club, season and competition
Club	Season	League			National cup (Note: Includes Serbian Cup, Czech Cup)		Continental		Other		Total	
Club	Season	Division	Apps	Goals	Apps	Goals	Apps	Goals	Apps	Goals	Apps	Goals
Mladenovac	2010–11	Serbian League Belgrade	11	0	—		—		—		11	0
Mladenovac	2011–12	Serbian First League	1	0	—		—		—		1	0
Mladenovac	Total		12	0	—		—		—		12	0
Kovačevac	2011–12	Serbian League Belgrade	14	0	—		—		—		14	0
Kovačevac	2012–13	Serbian League Belgrade	13	1	1	0	—		1 (Note: Including final match of the Belgrade Cup, against Grafičar)	1	15	2
Kovačevac	Total		27	1	1	0	—		1	1	29	2
Metalac	2012–13	Serbian First League	2	0	—		—		—		2	0
Metalac	2013–14	Serbian First League	25	3	1	0	—		1 (Note: Appearance in league play-offs)	0	27	3
Metalac	2014–15	Serbian First League	29	3	2	0	—		2 (Note: Appearances in league play-offs)	0	33	3
Metalac	2015–16	Serbian SuperLiga	28	2	1	0	—		—		29	2
Metalac	2016–17	Serbian SuperLiga	33	3	1	0	—		—		34	3
Metalac	Total		117	11	6	0	—		3	0	126	11
Baník Ostrava	2017–18	Czech First League	5	0	1	0	—		—		6	0
Career total			161	12	8	0	0	0	4	1	173	13

=== International ===
Appearances and goals by national team and year
National team	Year	Apps	Goals
Serbia
Serbia	2017	1	0
Total		1	0

== Honours ==
Mladenovac

- Serbian League Belgrade: 2010–11

Kovačevac

- Belgrade Cup: 2012

RFS

- Latvian Higher League: 2026
