= 2026 Latvian Higher League =

35th season of top-tier football in Latvia

Latvian Higher League
- Season: 2026
- Dates: 6 March – 8 November
- Champions: RFS
- Relegated: Ogre United
- Champions League: RFS
- Conference League: Riga; Auda; Daugavpils
- Matches: 170
- Goals: 493 (2.9 per match)
- Top goalscorer: Joseph Oloko Ede (28 goals)
- Biggest home win: RFS 6–1 Grobiņa (10 August 2026)
- Biggest away win: Jelgava 0–8 Riga (20 March 2026)
- Highest scoring: Jelgava 0–8 Riga (20 March 2026)
- Longest winning run: Riga (6 Matches)
- Longest unbeaten run: Riga (25 Matches)
- Longest winless run: Ogre United(17 Matches)
- Longest losing run: Ogre United(7 Matches)
- All statistics correct as of 26 October 2026.

The 2026 Latvian Higher League, known as the TonyBet Virslīga for sponsorship reasons, is the 35th season of top-tier football in Latvia. According to the LFF 2026 regulations, the championship is scheduled to be played in four rounds from 6 March until 8 November 2026; the official regulations and calendar are published by the Latvian Football Federation.

== Teams ==
Locations of the 2025 Latvian Higher League teams
Locations of the 2025 teams from Riga

The league consisted of ten teams; the top nine clubs from the previous season, and one team promoted from the Latvian First League. Riga entered the season as defending champions (for the second consecutive season).

The promoted team was 2025 Latvian First League champions Ogre United. They replaced the 2025 Latvian Higher League bottom-placed team Metta.

2026 Virslīga competitors

Club	Seasons in Virsliga	2025 position	Stadium	Capacity
Auda	8th	5th	Skonto Stadium	6,747
Daugavpils	11th	4th	Esplanādes stadions	575
Grobiņa	3rd	9th	Daugava Stadium (Liepāja)	4,022
FS Jelgava	4th	6th	Zemgale Olympic Center	1,560
Liepāja	13th	3rd	Daugava Stadium (Liepāja)	4,022
RFS	11th	2nd	LNK Sporta Parks	1,700
Ogre United	1st	1st in Latvian First League	Ogres stadions	1,262
Riga	11th	1st	Skonto Stadium	6,747
Super Nova	4th	8th	Jānis Skredelis' Stadium	396
Tukums 2000	6th	7th	Tukuma Pilsētas Stadions	425

=== Personnel ===
Note: Flags indicate national team as defined under FIFA eligibility rules. Players and Managers may hold more than one non-FIFA nationality.

Team	Head coach	Captain
Auda	(France) Didier Zanetti	(Latvia) Eduards Dašķevičs
BFC Daugavpils	(Latvia) Kirils Kurbatovs	(Latvia) Edgars Ivanovs
FK Grobiņa	(Latvia) Oskars Kļava	(Latvia) Dāvids Družiņins
FS Jelgava	(Latvia) Aleksandrs Basovs	(Latvia) Armands Pētersons
FK Liepāja	(Estonia) Vladimir Vassiljev	(Montenegro) Danijel Petković
Ogre United	(Latvia) Viktors Mazurs	(Latvia) Krists Kristers Gulbis
RFS	(Latvia) Viktors Morozs	(Slovenia) Žiga Lipušček
Riga FC	(Slovakia) Adrián Guľa	(Latvia) Antonijs Černomordijs
SK Super Nova	(Latvia) Maksims Rafaļskis	(Latvia) Mārcis Ošs
FK Tukums 2000	(Latvia) Kristaps Dišlers	(Latvia) Bogdans Samoilovs

=== Managerial changes ===
Team	Outgoing manager	Manner of departure	Date of vacancy	Table	Incoming manager	Date of appointment
SK Super Nova	(Latvia) Ervīns Pērkons	End of Contract	20 November 2025	Pre-season	(Latvia) Maksims Rafaļskis	22 December 2025
Ogre United	(Georgia (country)) Aleksandre Rekhviashvili	Resigned	30 April 2026	10th	(Latvia) Kristers Putniņš (interim)	30 April 2026
Ogre United	(Latvia) Kristers Putniņš (interim)	End of interim spell	23 May 2026	10th	(Latvia) Viktors Mazurs	23 May 2026
FK Liepāja	(Sweden) Andreas Alm	Mutual agreement	29 May 2026	5th	(Latvia) Jānis Goba (interim)	29 May 2026
FK Liepāja	(Latvia) Jānis Goba (interim)	End of interim spell	1 June 2026	4th	(Estonia) Vladimir Vassiljev	1 June 2026

== League table ==
Pos	Team	Pld	W	D	L	GF	GA	GD	Pts	Qualification or relegation
1	RFS (C)	35	28	5	2	87	24	+63	89	Qualification for the Champions League first qualifying round
2	Riga	35	25	8	2	95	33	+62	83	Qualification for the Conference League first qualifying round
3	Auda	36	22	7	7	63	39	+24	73	Qualification for the Conference League second qualifying round (Note: The 2026 Latvian Football Cup winners (Auda) qualify for the Conference League second qualifying round.)
4	Daugavpils	36	14	10	12	43	38	+5	52	Qualification for the Conference League first qualifying round
5	Liepāja	36	14	9	13	51	50	+1	51	
6	Super Nova	36	11	7	18	36	54	−18	40	
7	Jelgava	36	9	8	19	41	61	−20	35	
8	Grobiņa	36	6	11	19	28	66	−38	29	
9	Tukums 2000 (O)	36	5	10	21	45	69	−24	25	Qualification for the Latvian Higher League play-off
10	Ogre United (R)	36	4	7	25	34	89	−55	19	Relegation to Latvian First League

Source: LFF
Rules for classification: 1) Points; 2) Head-to-head points; 3) Head-to-head goal difference; 4) Head-to-head goals scored; 5) Goal difference; 6) Goals scored; 7) Play-off.
(C) Champions; (O) Play-off winners; (R) Relegated

== Results ==
Teams play each other four times (twice at home and twice away).

Home \ Away	AUD	DAU	GRO	JEL	LIE	OGR	RFS	RIG	SNO	TUK	AUD	DAU	GRO	JEL	LIE	OGR	RFS	RIG	SNO	TUK
Auda		2–3	7–0	1–1	3–1	2–0	0–3	1–2	2–1	2–1		1–0	1–0	4–3	1–0	1–0	1–1	0–2	1–1	3–0
Daugavpils	0–1		0–1	1–0	2–0	2–1	0–1	1–3	0–1	2–0	2–1		1–0	2–1	3–1	3–1	1–2	0–0	0–0	2–0
Grobiņa	0–2	1–1		0–0	1–0	2–2	0–1	0–3	0–1	3–3	0–0	1–0		0–0	1–2	3–2	1–3	2–5	0–2	3–1
Jelgava	2–3	1–1	0–1		1–1	0–2	0–1	0–8	1–0	2–1	0–1	0–1	2–0		0–2	4–0	0–1	0–1	0–1	4–1
Liepāja	1–2	2–1	1–1	1–1		4–1	0–1	2–1	2–1	3–0	2–3	0–0	3–1	3–0		4–0	0–2	3–2	3–3	0–0
Ogre United	1–1	0–4	1–1	0–1	0–1		3–4	1–4	1–2	1–1	1–4	1–2	1–1	2–3	2–2		0–3	0–0	1–0	3–2
RFS	0–1	4–1	6–1	4–0	5–0	2–0		3–3	2–0	3–1	1–1	3–1	3–0	4–2	0–0	6–0		3–3	4–0	2–0
Riga	4–1	4–2	2–0	2–2	1–0	4–0	2–1		3–0	3–3	2–2	1–1	4–0	3–0	4–0	4–1	–		2–1	3–1
Super Nova	1–2	0–0	2–0	1–1	1–2	3–1	1–2	1–4		1–1	0–2	1–1	2–1	1–5	1–2	1–2	0–3	0–1		1–0
Tukums 2000	2–1	1–1	1–1	5–0	2–2	6–1	1–2	1–3	1–2		1–2	1–1	1–1	1–4	2–1	2–1	0–1	0–2	1–2	

Updated to match(es) played on 8 November 2026. Source: LFF
Legend: Blue = home team win; Yellow = draw; Red = away team win.

=== Match results by week ===
Team ╲ Round	1	2	3	4	5	6	7	8	9	10	11	12	13	14	15	16	17	18	19	20	21	22	23	24	25	26	27	28	29	30	31	32	33	34	35	36
RFS	W	W	W	L	W	W	W	W	D	W	W	W	W	W	W	W	W	W	L	W	W	W	D	W	W	W	D	W	D	W	D	W				
Riga	L	W	W	W	D	W	W	W	D	W	W	W	D	W	W	W	W	W	W	D	W	W	W	W	W	D	L	D	D	W	W	W				
Auda	W	W	L	W	W	L	D	W	W	W	W	L	L	W	W	W	D	L	W	D	L	D	W	W	W	W	D	W	D	W	D	W				
Liepāja	W	L	W	L	L	D	D	W	D	L	L	W	W	L	D	W	W	L	L	L	W	L	W	L	W	W	L	W	D	D	D	L				
Jelgava	W	D	L	L	L	D	L	L	W	L	W	D	D	L	D	D	D	L	W	W	W	L	L	L	L	L	W	W	L	D	L	L				
Daugavpils	L	L	L	W	W	W	W	D	L	D	L	L	L	W	L	D	D	D	W	D	L	W	W	L	W	W	D	L	D	L	D	W				
Super Nova	L	D	W	W	W	L	L	L	W	L	L	D	W	W	L	L	L	D	L	L	W	L	W	L	L	D	D	W	W	L	L	W				
Tukums	L	D	L	D	D	L	D	D	L	W	W	D	D	L	L	L	D	W	L	L	L	L	L	L	W	L	L	L	W	L	D	L				
Grobiņa	W	L	W	D	L	D	L	L	D	D	L	D	D	L	D	L	L	W	L	D	L	W	L	D	L	L	L	W	L	D	D	L	W			
Ogre Utd	L	D	L	L	L	D	D	L	L	L	L	L	L	L	D	L	L	W	L	W	L	W	L	D	L	L	L	L	D	L	W	L	L			

Updated to match(es) played on 17 October 2026. Source:
W = Win; D = Draw; L = Loss

=== Position by round ===
Team ╲ Round	1	2	3	4	5	6	7	8	9	10	11	12	13	14	15	16	17	18	19	20	21	22	23	24	25	26	27	28	29	30	31	32	33	34	35	36
RFS	1	2	1	2	2	1	1	1	1	1	1	1	1	1	1	1	1	1	1	1	1	1	1	1	1	1	1	1	1	1	1	1	1	-	-	-
Riga	9	6	2	1	3	2	2	2	2	2	2	2	2	2	2	2	2	2	2	2	2	2	2	2	2	2	2	2	2	2	2	2	2	-	-	-
Auda	2	1	3	3	1	3	3	3	3	3	3	3	3	3	3	3	3	3	3	3	3	3	3	3	3	3	3	3	3	3	3	3	3	3	3	-
Liepāja	4	4	4	6	7	7	6	5	6	6	4	4	4	4	4	4	4	4	4	4	4	5	5	4	4	4	4	4	4	4	4	4	-	-	-	-
Daugavpils	6	10	10	8	6	5	4	4	4	4	6	6	6	6	6	6	6	6	5	5	6	4	4	6	6	6	6	6	6	6	5	5	-	-	-	-
Super Nova	7	9	6	4	4	4	5	6	5	5	5	5	5	5	5	5	5	5	6	7	7	6	6	7	7	7	7	7	7	7	6	6	6	-	-	-
Jelgava	3	3	7	7	8	8	8	8	8	9	7	7	7	7	7	7	7	7	7	6	5	7	7	5	5	5	5	5	5	5	7	7	7	-	-	-
Grobiņa	5	5	5	5	5	6	7	7	7	7	9	9	9	9	9	9	9	9	9	9	9	8	8	9	9	9	9	9	9	9	8	8	8	-	-	-
Tukums	8	7	8	9	9	9	9	9	9	8	8	8	8	8	8	8	8	8	8	8	8	9	9	8	8	8	8	8	8	8	9	9	9	-	-	-
Ogre Utd	10	8	9	10	10	10	10	10	10	10	10	10	10	10	10	10	10	10	10	10	10	10	10	10	10	10	10	10	10	10	10	10	10	10	-	-

Champions of 2026 Latvian Higher League/ Qualification for Champions League
Qualification for Conference League
Qualification for the Latvian Higher League play-off
Relegation to Latvian First League

Updated to match(es) played on 17 October 2026. Source:

== Latvian Higher League play-off ==
11 November 2026	Tukums 2000	1–0	Valmiera	Tukums
14:00	Deružinskis 48'	[Report]		Stadium: Tukuma pilsētas stadions Attendance: 188; Referee: Aleksandrs Anufrijevs

14 November 2026	Valmiera	0–1	Tukums 2000	Valmiera
14:00		[Report]	Volkovs 33'	Stadium: Vidzemes Olimpiskais centrs Attendance: 426; Referee: Deniss Kozlovs

== Statistics ==
=== Top scorers ===
As of 18 October 2026

Rank	Player	Club	Goals
1	(Nigeria) Joseph Oloko Ede	Tukums 2000/Liepāja	28
2	(The Gambia) Muhammed Badamosi	Riga	22
3	(Panama) Josué Vergara	Auda	14
4	(Serbia) Darko Lemajić	RFS	13
5	(Cameroon) Rostand Ndjiki	Daugavpils/RFS	12
5	(Serbia) Stefan Panič	RFS	12
7	(Latvia) Kristers Čudars	Ogre United	10

=== Clean sheets ===
Rank	Player	Club	Clean sheets
