= LNK Sporta Parks =

Football stadium in Latvia

LNK Sporta parks
- Interactive map of LNK Sporta parks
- Location: Lejupes iela 5, Riga, Latvia
- Coordinates: 56.908°N 24.155°E
- Capacity: 1,674

Construction
- Opened: August 9, 2022

Tenants
- RFS (2022–); Leevon PPK (2022–); Latvia women's national football team RFS Women (2024–)

Website
- lnksportaparks.lv

LNK Sporta parks (English: LNK Sports Park) is a football stadium and multi-sport complex located in Riga, Latvia. The stadium was built in 2022 and currently has 1,674 seats in total. It is the largest privately owned sports complex in Latvia and the country's 7th-largest football stadium by capacity. The stadium design incorporates a number of auxiliary facilities, including an additional five pitches, beach tennis and beach volleyball facilities, among others.

== Location ==
LNK Sporta parks is located on the outskirts of eastern Riga at Lejupes iela 5 (Lejupe Street), on the left bank of the Daugava River in the neighbourhood of Katlakalns near the Southern Bridge. The location is next to the city limits of Riga, with the village of Valdlauči of Ķekava Parish, Ķekava Municipality bordering the sports complex.

== Facilities ==
LNK is the largest private sports complex in Latvia, and the country's seventh-largest football stadium with a capacity of 1,700 seats.

It has a total area of 65,000 m2 and encapsulates two natural grass pitches, both with an area of 16,448 m2, one full and three smaller artificial turf pitches with an area of 13,851 m2, a natural grass warmup pitch with an area of 1,350 m2, and, finally, two beach tennis/beach volleyball courts with an area of 678 m2 each.

In 2023, the Eastern stand of the stadium was rebuilt with a new permanent structure, replacing the previous modular mobile seating. Additionally, four lighting towers were installed to comply with the UEFA stadium requirements. Following this, the West stand was also similarly reconstructed, building a new structure that includes private lodges and is covered by a cantilever roof. The construction was completed in 2024.

== Use ==
=== General activities ===
LNK Sporta parks is primarily used for hosting football matches. Since its opening in 2022, it has been the home stadium for the Latvian Higher League club RFS and Latvian Second League club Leevon PPK (a merger of Leevon Saldus and FK PPK/Betsafe), as well as a number of other teams at different levels of the league system (e.g. Latvian Third League team FK RSU of the Riga Stradiņš University), albeit on an irregular basis.

Additionally, the stadium is used for amateur events in beach tennis and beach volleyball, along with recreational use.

=== Notable events ===
On 2 October 2021, FIFA president Gianni Infantino paid a visit to Latvia, which involved meetings with Latvian Prime Minister Arturs Krišjānis Kariņš, Latvian Football Federation president Vadims Ļašenko, Virslīga and FK RFS representatives Māris Verpakovskis and Artemijs Mišins, among others, along with a visit to the LNK Sporta parks venue.

On 21 September 2022, UEFA president Aleksander Čeferin visited the LNK Sporta parks during a trip to Latvia, where he met with Ļašenko and FK RFS chairman Artjoms Milovs, discussing the future of sustainable football development in Latvia and the Baltic region.

On 17 July 2023, the first national team match was played in the complex, where Latvia women's national football team played a 1-1 draw against Azerbaijan women's national football team.
