= 2024 Latvian Higher League =

Latvian Higher League
- Season: 2024
- Dates: 8 March – 9 November 2024
- Champions: RFS (3rd title)
- Relegated: Valmiera
- Champions League: RFS
- Conference League: Auda; Daugavpils; Riga
- Matches: 154
- Goals: 454 (2.95 per match)
- Top goalscorer: Reginaldo Ramires (25 goals)
- All statistics correct as of 2 October 2024.

The 2024 Latvian Higher League, known as the TonyBet Virslīga for sponsorship reasons, was the 33rd season of top-tier football in Latvia. The season began on 8 March 2024 and ended on 9 November.

The winners (RFS, their second consecutive title win and third overall) qualified for the 2025–26 Champions League first qualifying round. The runners-up (Riga) qualified for the 2025–26 Conference League second qualifying round, with the third and fifth-placed teams (Auda and Daugavpils) qualifying for the first qualifying round. The ninth-placed team (Grobiņa) qualified for the Latvian Higher League play-off, winning and retaining their place in the league. The fourth-placed team (Valmiera) were relegated to the 2025 Latvian Second League at the end of the season after being refused both Latvian Higher League and Latvian First League licenses, giving a reprieve to the bottom-placed team (Jelgava).

== Teams ==
The league consisted of ten teams; the top nine clubs from the previous season, and one team promoted from the Latvian First League. RFS entered the season as defending champions.

Grobiņa were promoted as champions of the 2023 Latvian First League, replacing the 2023 Latvian Higher League bottom-placed team (Super Nova).

Locations of the 2024 Latvian Higher League teams

2024 Virslīga competitors
Club	Seasons in Virsliga	2023 position	Stadium	Capacity
Auda	3	3rd	Skonto Stadium	8,087
Daugavpils	11	7th	Esplanādes stadions	1,980
Grobiņa	0	1st in Latvian First League	Daugava Stadium (Liepāja)	4,022
Jelgava	2	6th	Zemgale Olympic Center	2,500
Liepāja	11	5th	Daugava Stadium (Liepāja)	4,022
Metta	13	9th	Daugava Stadium (Riga)	10,461
RFS	9	1st	LNK Sporta Parks	2,300
Riga	9	2nd	Skonto Stadium	8,087
Tukums 2000	3	8th	Tukuma Pilsētas Stadions	1,000
Valmiera	7	4th	Jāņa Daliņa Stadions	1,250

== League table ==
Pos	Team	Pld	W	D	L	GF	GA	GD	Pts	Qualification or relegation
1	RFS (C)	36	29	3	4	103	25	+78	90	Qualification for the Champions League first qualifying round
2	Riga	36	27	6	3	99	23	+76	87	Qualification for the Conference League second qualifying round (Note: The 2024 Latvian Football Cup winners qualified for the Conference League second qualifying round. Since the cup winners (RFS) qualified based on league position, the Conference League spot was passed to the second-placed team, and the second Conference League first qualifying round spot was passed to the fourth-placed team.)
3	Auda	36	18	6	12	63	34	+29	60	Qualification for the Conference League first qualifying round
4	Valmiera (D, X)	36	19	7	10	75	39	+36	55 (Note: On 19 April, Valmiera were deducted three points, with an additional six points and a suspended 25 points deduction being issued on 11 October due to licensing regulation breaches.)	Disqualification and relegation to the Latvian Second League (Note: Valmiera were disqualified at the end of the season after being refused both Latvian Higher League and Latvian First League licenses resulting in an immediate demotion to the Latvian Second League; Jelgava were reprieved from relegation.)
5	Daugavpils	36	11	9	16	43	60	−17	42	Qualification for the Conference League first qualifying round
6	Liepāja	36	10	9	17	37	56	−19	39	
7	Metta	36	10	6	20	34	76	−42	36	
8	Tukums 2000	36	9	8	19	38	81	−43	35	
9	Grobiņa (O)	36	8	5	23	34	78	−44	29	Qualification for the Latvian Higher League play-off
10	Jelgava (T)	36	6	7	23	28	82	−54	25	Relegation to the Latvian First League, but later readmitted.

Source: LFF, Soccerway
Rules for classification: 1) Points; 2) Head-to-head points; 3) Head-to-head goal difference; 4) Goal difference; 5) Goals scored; 6) Fair-play ranking; 7) Play-off.
(C) Champions; (D) Disqualified; (O) Play-off winners; (T) Originally relegated, but readmitted to fill vacancy.; (X) Banned from Latvian Higher League license and relegated to 2025 Latvian Second League

== Results ==
Teams play each other four times (twice at home and twice away).

Home \ Away	AUD	DAU	GRO	JEL	LIE	MLU	RFS	RIG	TUK	VAL	AUD	DAU	GRO	JEL	LIE	MLU	RFS	RIG	TUK	VAL
Auda		1–0	0–1	0–1	1–1	4–0	1–2	1–2	2–0	3–1		1–0	2–0	3–0	2–0	5–0	1–3	2–2	1–1	0–1
Daugavpils	0–3		2–0	1–0	0–0	4–0	1–1	0–2	3–1	1–6	1–2		4–0	3–0	0–2	1–1	0–3	0–5	4–1	3–3
Grobiņa	1–1	1–3		4–2	3–2	3–0	0–4	0–1	2–1	0–2	2–2	3–0		2–3	1–3	1–2	0–2	0–6	1–2	1–4
Jelgava	0–0	0–0	2–1		1–1	0–1	1–2	1–5	2–3	0–3	1–3	0–0	2–0		2–2	1–0	0–2	0–2	0–0	0–4
Liepāja	1–0	1–1	3–0	0–1		1–2	0–3	1–1	0–2	0–3	2–1	3–3	0–1	3–0		1–5	1–3	0–3	3–1	0–0
Metta	1–3	0–1	1–1	3–0	2–0		0–6	1–2	1–1	0–2	0–4	3–2	2–1	2–0	1–2		1–2	2–4	0–0	1–1
RFS	2–1	5–0	5–0	5–1	4–1	2–0		2–2	5–0	0–1	1–2	4–1	3–0	7–0	2–0	5–1		1–2	4–1	4–1
Riga	1–0	2–0	2–0	2–0	4–0	5–0	1–2		3–0	1–1	1–0	1–0	6–1	6–1	1–0	4–0	0–0		10–1	1–0
Tukums 2000	1–4	1–2	2–0	2–1	0–0	0–0	0–1	2–1		1–2	0–3	0–0	1–2	3–3	2–1	0–1	1–4	0–5		3–2
Valmiera	2–1	0–1	1–1	4–0	0–1	3–0	2–0	2–1	6–1		2–3	4–1	0–0	3–2	0–1	4–0	1–2	2–2	2–3	

Source: LFF, Soccerway
Legend: Blue = home team win; Yellow = draw; Red = away team win.

== Latvian Higher League play-off ==
The ninth-placed club (Grobiņa) faced the third-placed club from the 2024 Latvian First League (JDFS Alberts) in a two-legged play-off for the final place in the 2025 Latvian Higher League. Although Grobina won the play-off, the tie was bannalised following Valmeria's disqualification to the third tier.

=== First leg ===
20 November 2024	Grobiņa	2–3	JDFS Alberts	Grobiņa
11:00 BST	Sdaigui 15'; Halata 20'		Indrāns 16'; Zegele 40'; Andersons 43'	Stadium: Grobiņa Stadium

=== Second leg ===
23 November 2024	JDFS Alberts	0–2 (3–4 agg.)	Grobiņa	Riga
10:00 BST			Gaučis 36', 42'	Stadium: Daugavgrīvas vidusskolas stadions

== Statistics ==
=== Top scorers ===
As of 10 January 2025

Rank	Player	Club	Goals
1	(Brazil) Reginaldo Ramires	Auda/Riga	25
2	(Senegal) Alioune Ndoye	Valmiera	22
3	(Latvia) Marko Regža	Riga	18
4	(Latvia) Jānis Ikaunieks	RFS	16
5	(Nigeria) Abdulrahman Taiwo	Riga/Auda	12
6	(Ivory Coast) Ismaël Diomandé	RFS	11
6	(Nigeria) Joseph Oloko Ede	Jelgava	11
8	(Serbia) Darko Lemajić	RFS	10
8	(Latvia) Lūkass Vapne	Valmiera	10
8	(Senegal) Mohamet Corréa	Metta	10

== Attendances ==
#	Football club	Average attendance
1	Riga FC	1,200
2	FK Liepāja	595
3	Grobiņas SC	559
4	FK RFS	493
5	Valmiera FC	450
6	BFC Daugavpils	436
7	FK Metta	319
8	FS Jelgava	286
9	FK Tukums 2000	261
10	FK Auda	229
