= FK RFS =

RFS
- Full name: Biedrība FC RFS; Futbola klubs RFS
- Founded: 2016; 10 years ago (predecessor FSK Daugava 90 founded in May 19, 2005; 21 years ago)
- Ground: LNK Sporta Parks
- Capacity: 2,300
- Chairman: Artjoms Milovs
- Manager: Viktors Morozs
- League: Virslīga
- 2026: Virslīga, 1st of 10 (champions)
- Website: fkrfs.lv
| Home colours | Away colours | Third colours |

FK RFS (also FC RFS) is a professional Latvian football club based in Riga. The club competes in the Virslīga, the top tier of Latvian football. It has existed in its current form since 2016, with predecessors dating back to 2005.

The team traditionally wears a blue home kit and a white away kit. After spending its first six years at Jānis Skredelis Stadium, RFS has played at the privately funded LNK Sporta Parks since 2022.

RFS has won the Latvian championship four times (2021, 2023, 2024 and 2026) and the Latvian Cup three times (2019, 2021, 2024). In 2022, the club was named Best Sports Club in Riga. That year, RFS became only the second Latvian club to qualify for the group stage of a European competition, following Ventspils in 2009–10, after defeating Linfield in the UEFA Europa Conference League play-off. In January 2025, RFS recorded the first-ever victory by a Latvian club in a UEFA group stage, defeating Ajax.

== History ==
=== Origins ===
Until 2003, the nucleus of the future club was a youth team of players born in 1990–91 under JFK Skonto, the academy of FK Skonto, coached by Vladimirs Beļajevs. In 2003 Beļajevs and his players left to form Futbola sporta skola Daugava (FSK Daugava).

On 19 May 2005, the semi-professional club FSK Daugava 90 was established, built around players born 1989–99. The team entered the Latvian First League in 2007 and was renamed FK Daugava the following year. After winning promotion in 2008, they were relegated from the Virslīga in 2009.

Between 2009 and 2011 the club operated as Rīgas futbola skola (not connected with the Riga Football School academy founded in 1962). The current legal entity, biedrība FC RFS, was registered on 9 September 2009.

Rīgas futbola skola placed third in the 1. līga in 2015, just missing promotion. In 2016, following the revocation of Skonto FC’s licence, the Latvian Football Federation awarded its spot to the club, which rebranded as RFS and returned to the Virslīga.

=== Settling in (2016–2017) ===
With limited preparation time, RFS recruited experienced players, including Ritus Krjauklis and Aleksejs Višņakovs. The club finished sixth in 2016, narrowly above the relegation play-off. Managerial changes led to Jurijs Ševļakovs taking charge.

In 2017, under Andrejs Kaļiņins, RFS added Aleksandrs Cauņa, Roberts Savaļnieks, and Lasha Shergelashvili. Young striker Roberts Uldriķis scored twice on his debut against champions Jūrmalas Spartaks. The team finished fifth, just short of European qualification.

=== First success (2018–2020) ===
Valdas Dambrauskas was appointed head coach in December 2017. RFS placed third in 2018, securing European qualification for the first time. The team’s attacking style featured 57 goals in 28 matches.

In 2019, strong transfers included Tomáš Šimkovič, Slavko Blagojević, and striker Darko Lemajič. RFS finished runners-up in the league and won the Latvian Cup, the club’s first major trophy. Their European debut ended in the first qualifying round against Olimpija Ljubljana.

In 2020 Dambrauskas departed for HNK Gorica, with assistant Viktors Morozs taking over. RFS finished second again in a COVID-affected season, with Brazilian loanee Emerson finishing top scorer.

=== The double (2021) ===
RFS strengthened with Emerson, Tomislav Šarić, and others. In Europe, they eliminated Klaksvíkar Ítróttarfelag and Puskás Akadémia before falling to KAA Gent. Domestically, RFS won both the Latvian Cup and their first Virslīga title, achieving a domestic double.

=== European breakthrough (2022) ===
RFS debuted in the Champions League qualifiers, losing to HJK Helsinki and dropping into the Europa Conference League. After eliminating Hibernians and Linfield, they reached the group stage, only the second Latvian club ever to do so.

In the league, RFS slipped to third, and lost the Latvian Cup final to FK Auda. In Europe, they drew against Fiorentina and Istanbul Başakşehir but finished bottom of their group.

=== Regaining the title (2023) ===
RFS legally changed its name to FC RFS in May 2023. Despite an unbeaten start, they trailed Riga FC for much of the season. On the final day, RFS overtook their rivals to claim a second Virslīga championship. They were eliminated from European qualifiers by Sabah FK.

=== Europa League and domestic dominance (2024) ===
In 2024, RFS defeated Larne and UE Santa Coloma in qualifiers, eventually reaching the UEFA Europa League group stage after defeating APOEL. On 23 January 2025, they beat Ajax 1–0, marking the first Latvian win in a UEFA group-stage match.

== Grounds ==
RFS initially played at multiple venues before settling at Jānis Skredelis Stadium (2016–2022). Since mid-2022 they have been based at LNK Sporta Parks, a modern complex built by LNK Properties. The facility has two natural grass pitches, three artificial fields, and training grounds. Selected European matches are played at Skonto Stadium or Daugava Stadium.

== Honours ==
- Latvian Higher League
  - Champions: 2021, 2023, 2024, 2026
  - Runners-up: 2019, 2020, 2025
  - Third place: 2018, 2022
- Latvian Cup
  - Winners: 2019, 2021, 2024
  - Runners-up: 2022, 2023

== Records and statistics ==
- Most appearances: Roberts Savaļnieks (213, 2016–2024)
- Leading goalscorer: Emerson Deocleciano (53 goals, 2020–2025)
- Most goals in a season: Andrej Ilić (21, 2022)
- Most assists: Roberts Savaļnieks (48)
- Longest unbeaten run in Virslīga (21st century): 38 matches (390 days)
- Record transfer: Andrej Ilić to Vålerenga for €1.6m (2023)

== Rivalries ==
=== Riga Derby ===
RFS share a fierce rivalry with Riga FC, with both clubs emerging as dominant forces since 2016. Each has won three league titles. The derby is the most attended fixture in Latvian club football, averaging around 3,000 spectators. On November 7, 2026, Riga FC announced that they would not play against this team on November 8, 2026.

== In popular culture ==
The 2022 documentary series Fight for the Dream 22′, directed by Rimvydas Čekavičius, followed RFS during their 2022–23 UEFA Europa Conference League campaign. The six-part series depicted both on- and off-field moments from their historic European run.

== European record ==
As of match played 13 August 2026

| Competition | GP | W | D | L | GF | GA | ± |
|---|---|---|---|---|---|---|---|
| UEFA Champions League | 10 | 5 | 0 | 5 | 13 | 14 | –1 |
| UEFA Europa League | 17 | 5 | 2 | 10 | 22 | 24 | –2 |
| UEFA Conference League | 28 | 9 | 8 | 11 | 40 | 38 | +2 |
| Total | 55 | 19 | 10 | 26 | 75 | 76 | –1 |

| Season | Competition | Round | Club | Home | Away | Agg. |
|---|---|---|---|---|---|---|
| 2019–20 | UEFA Europa League | 1QR | (Slovenia) Olimpija Ljubljana | 0–2 | 3–2 | 3–4 |
| 2020–21 | UEFA Europa League | 1QR | (Serbia) Partizan | —N/a | 0–1 | —N/a |
| 2021–22 | UEFA Conference League | 1QR | (Faroe Islands) KÍ | 2–3 | 4–2 (a.e.t.) | 6–5 |
| 2021–22 | UEFA Conference League | 2QR | (Hungary) Puskás Akadémia | 3–0 | 2–0 | 5–0 |
| 2021–22 | UEFA Conference League | 3QR | (Belgium) Gent | 0–1 | 2–2 | 2–3 |
| 2022–23 | UEFA Champions League | 1QR | (Finland) HJK | 2–1 (a.e.t.) | 0–1 | 2–2 (4–5 p) |
| 2022–23 | UEFA Conference League | 3QR | (Malta) Hibernians | 1–1 | 3–1 | 4–2 |
| 2022–23 | UEFA Conference League | PO | (Northern Ireland) Linfield | 2–2 | 1–1 (a.e.t.) | 3–3 (4–2 p) |
| 2022–23 | UEFA Conference League | GS | (Turkey) Başakşehir | 0–0 | 0–3 | 4th |
| 2022–23 | UEFA Conference League | GS | (Italy) Fiorentina | 0–3 | 1–1 | 4th |
| 2022–23 | UEFA Conference League | GS | (Scotland) Hearts | 0–2 | 1–2 | 4th |
| 2023–24 | UEFA Conference League | 1QR | (North Macedonia) Makedonija GP | 4–1 | 1–0 | 5–1 |
| 2023–24 | UEFA Conference League | 2QR | (Azerbaijan) Sabah | 0–2 | 1–2 | 1–4 |
| 2024–25 | UEFA Champions League | 1QR | (Northern Ireland) Larne | 3–0 | 4–0 | 7–0 |
| 2024–25 | UEFA Champions League | 2QR | (Norway) Bodø/Glimt | 1–3 | 0–4 | 1–7 |
| 2024–25 | UEFA Europa League | 3QR | (Andorra) UE Santa Coloma | 7–0 | 2–0 | 9–0 |
| 2024–25 | UEFA Europa League | PO | (Cyprus) APOEL | 2–1 | 1–2 (a.e.t.) | 3–3 (4–2 p) |
| 2024–25 | UEFA Europa League | LP | (Netherlands) Ajax | 1–0 | —N/a | 32nd |
| 2024–25 | UEFA Europa League | LP | (Germany) Eintracht Frankfurt | —N/a | 0–1 | 32nd |
| 2024–25 | UEFA Europa League | LP | (Greece) PAOK | 0–2 | —N/a | 32nd |
| 2024–25 | UEFA Europa League | LP | (Israel) Maccabi Tel Aviv | —N/a | 1–2 | 32nd |
| 2024–25 | UEFA Europa League | LP | (Turkey) Galatasaray | 2–2 | —N/a | 32nd |
| 2024–25 | UEFA Europa League | LP | (Ukraine) Dynamo Kyiv | —N/a | 0–1 | 32nd |
| 2024–25 | UEFA Europa League | LP | (Belgium) Anderlecht | 1–1 | —N/a | 32nd |
| 2024–25 | UEFA Europa League | LP | (Romania) FCSB | —N/a | 1–4 | 32nd |
| 2025–26 | UEFA Champions League | 1QR | (Estonia) FCI Levadia | 1–0 | 1–0 | 2–0 |
| 2025–26 | UEFA Champions League | 2QR | (Sweden) Malmö FF | 1–4 | 0–1 | 1–5 |
| 2025–26 | UEFA Europa League | 3QR | (Finland) KuPS | 1–2 | 0–1 | 1–3 |
| 2025–26 | UEFA Conference League | PO | (Malta) Hamrun Spartans | 2–2 | 0–1 | 2–3 |
| 2026–27 | UEFA Conference League | 1QR | (Northern Ireland) Glentoran | 2–0 | 2–1 | 4–1 |
| 2026–27 | UEFA Conference League | 2QR | (Iceland) Vestri | 4–1 | 1–1 | 5–2 |
| 2026–27 | UEFA Conference League | 3QR | (Czech Republic) Jablonec | 1–2 | 0–2 | 1–4 |
| 2027–28 | UEFA Champions League | 1QR | | | | |

Notes

- QR: Qualifying round
- GS: Group stage
- LP: League phase

=== UEFA Club Ranking ===
As of 1 October 2025

| Rank | Team | Points |
|---|---|---|
| 123 | (Belgium) KRC Genk | 13.000 |
| 124 | (Belgium) Cercle Brugge K.S.V. | 12.750 |
| 125 | (Latvia) FK RFS | 12.500 |
| 126 | (Switzerland) Servette FC | 12.500 |
| 127 | (Kazakhstan) FC Astana | 12.500 |

== Players ==
=== Current squad ===
As of 28 August 2026

Note: Flags indicate national team as defined under FIFA eligibility rules; some limited exceptions apply. Players may hold more than one non-FIFA nationality.

| No. | Pos. | Nation | Player |
|---|---|---|---|
| 1 | GK | LAT | Rihards Matrevics |
| 3 | FW | NGR | Victor Osuagwu |
| 4 | DF | LAT | Roberts Veips |
| 5 | DF | LAT | Niks Sliede |
| 6 | DF | SRB | Aleksandar Filipović |
| 7 | FW | CIV | Ismaël Diomandé |
| 8 | MF | GEO | Lasha Odisharia |
| 9 | MF | CRO | Duje Korač |
| 10 | MF | LAT | Jānis Ikaunieks |
| 11 | DF | LAT | Roberts Savaļnieks |
| 14 | FW | CIV | Mamadou Sylla |
| 15 | FW | CMR | Rostand Ndjiki |
| 16 | GK | LAT | Jevgēņijs Ņerugals |
| 17 | FW | CIV | Cedric Kouadio |
| 18 | MF | LAT | Dmitrijs Zelenkovs |

| No. | Pos. | Nation | Player |
|---|---|---|---|
| 19 | FW | POR | Alfa Baldé |
| 20 | FW | NGR | Kingsley Emenike (on loan from Jelgava) |
| 21 | MF | LAT | Niks Dusalijevs |
| 22 | FW | SRB | Darko Lemajić |
| 23 | DF | ALB | Herdi Prenga |
| 26 | MF | SRB | Stefan Panić |
| 30 | MF | GAM | Rasid Njie |
| 35 | GK | CRO | Marko Marić |
| 43 | DF | SLO | Žiga Lipušček (captain) |
| 49 | MF | LAT | Mārtiņš Ķigurs |
| 66 | MF | GAM | Modou Saidy |
| 77 | FW | COD | Gauthier Mankenda |
| 81 | MF | SRB | Strahinja Rakić |
| 99 | DF | NGR | Shina Kumater |

=== Out on loan ===
Note: Flags indicate national team as defined under FIFA eligibility rules; some limited exceptions apply. Players may hold more than one non-FIFA nationality.

| No. | Pos. | Nation | Player |
|---|---|---|---|
| - | GK | LAT | Jānis Beks (at BFC Daugavpils until 31 December 2026) |
| - | GK | LAT | Sergej Vilkovs (at Tukums until 31 December 2026) |

| No. | Pos. | Nation | Player |
|---|---|---|---|
| - | DF | UKR | Maksym Derkach (at Tukums until 31 December 2026) |
| - | FW | UKR | Daniel Kivinda (at BFC Daugavpils until 31 December 2026) |

== Personnel ==
=== Current technical staff ===
| Position | Staff |
|---|---|
| Head coach | (Latvia) Viktors Morozs |
| Assistant coach | (Latvia) Vladimirs Žavoronkovs |
| Goalkeeping coach | (Russia) Anton Savchenkov |
| Fitness coach | (Latvia) Oļegs Semjonovs |
| Sports therapist | (Latvia) Dmitrijs Jefremenkovs, Rihards Ūdris |
| Technical analyst | (Latvia) Iļja Ščaņicins |
| Head of media & communications | (Lithuania) Paulius Jakelis |
| Photographer | (Latvia) Sanita Ieva Sparāne |

=== Management ===
| Position | Staff |
|---|---|
| President | (Latvia) Artjoms Milovs |
| General director | (Latvia) Māris Verpakovskis |
| Director of football | (Latvia) Aleksandrs Usovs |
| Executive director | (Latvia) Nikolajs Kulmanakovs |
| Team administrator | (Latvia) Kirils Butovskis |
