= List of Latvian football transfers summer 2023 =

This is a list of Latvian football transfers in the summer transfer window 2023 by club. Only clubs of the 2023 Latvian Higher League are included.

== Latvian Higher League ==
=== Valmiera FC ===
In: Note: Flags indicate national team as defined under FIFA eligibility rules; some limited exceptions apply. Players may hold more than one non-FIFA nationality.

| No. | Pos. | Nation | Player |
|---|---|---|---|
| — | DF | LVA | Bruno Čākurs (from Staiceles Bebri) |
| — | MF | JPN | Hideyasu Tanaka (from (Japan) Tokyo) |
| — | MF | BIH | Rifet Kapic (from (Ukraine) Kryvbas Kryvyi Rih) |
| — | MF | LVA | Oskars Stupelis (from FK Smiltene) |
| — | MF | UKR | Artem Mylchenko (from (Ukraine) Lviv) |
| — | MF | UKR | Andriy Korobenko (from (Ukraine) Inhulets Petrove) |
| — | FW | COL | Camilo Mena (loan return from (Poland) Jagiellonia Białystok, later to (Poland) Lechia Gdańsk) |
| — | FW | BRA | Leo Gaucho (from RFS) |
| — | FW | LVA | Kristiāns Kaušelis (loan return from Super Nova, later to Tukums 2000) |

Out: Note: Flags indicate national team as defined under FIFA eligibility rules; some limited exceptions apply. Players may hold more than one non-FIFA nationality.

| No. | Pos. | Nation | Player |
|---|---|---|---|
| — | GK | LVA | Dāvis Veisbuks (to Super Nova) |
| — | DF | LVA | Alvis Jaunzems (to (Poland) Stal) |
| — | MF | BIH | Rifet Kapic (on loan to (Poland) Lechia Gdańsk) |
| — | MF | UKR | Ivan Zhelizko (to (Poland) Lechia Gdańsk) |
| — | FW | COL | Camilo Mena (to (Poland) Lechia Gdańsk) |
| — | FW | LVA | Kristiāns Kaušelis (to Tukums 2000, was on loan at Super Nova) |

=== Riga ===
In: Note: Flags indicate national team as defined under FIFA eligibility rules; some limited exceptions apply. Players may hold more than one non-FIFA nationality.

| No. | Pos. | Nation | Player |
|---|---|---|---|
| — | DF | SWE | Doug Bergqvist (loan return from Auda, later to (Sweden) Degerfor) |
| — | DF | SEN | Bakary Diawara (from (Denmark) Nordsjælland) |
| — | MF | ESP | Brian Peña (from (Slovakia) Zemplín Michalovce) |
| — | MF | COD | Gauthier Mankenda (from Liepāja) |
| — | MF | PER | Luis Iberico (from (Peru) Melgar) |
| — | MF | LVA | Deniss Meļņiks (on loan from Auda) |
| — | FW | CRC | Anthony Contreras (from (Costa Rica) Herediano) |
| — | FW | NGA | Abdulrahman Taiwo (from (Denmark) SønderjyskE, was on loan at (Slovakia) Spartak Trnava) |

Out: Note: Flags indicate national team as defined under FIFA eligibility rules; some limited exceptions apply. Players may hold more than one non-FIFA nationality.

| No. | Pos. | Nation | Player |
|---|---|---|---|
| — | DF | SWE | Doug Bergqvist (to (Sweden) Degerfor) |
| — | DF | LVA | Iļja Korotkovs (to Auda) |
| — | DF | SEN | Bakary Diawara (on loan to Auda) |
| — | DF | LVA | Armands Pētersons (to Auda) |
| — | MF | UKR | Yuriy Vakulko (to (Ukraine) Kryvbas Kryvyi Rih) |
| — | MF | GHA | Joselpho Barnes (to (Belgium) Sint-Truiden) |
| — | MF | GRE | Thanos Petsos (released) |
| — | MF | FRA | Mohamed Ouadah (to (France) Rouen) |
| — | MF | FIN | Mikael Soisalo (to (Hungary) Puskás Akadémia) |
| — | MF | CIV | Aboubakar Karamoko (loan return to Auda, later on loan to (United Arab Emirates) Dubai United) |
| — | FW | BRA | Reginaldo (on loan to Auda) |
| — | FW | CRO | Marko Dabro (loan return to (China) Beijing Guoan) |
| — | FW | BRA | Lucas Rangel (to (Ukraine) Kolos Kovalivka) |

=== RFS ===
In: Note: Flags indicate national team as defined under FIFA eligibility rules; some limited exceptions apply. Players may hold more than one non-FIFA nationality.

| No. | Pos. | Nation | Player |
|---|---|---|---|
| — | GK | LVA | Sergejs Vilkovs (loan return from Tukums 2000) |
| — | DF | ALB | Herdi Prenga (from (Hungary) Honvéd) |
| — | MF | LVA | Gļebs Žaleiko (loan return from BFC Daugavpils) |
| — | MF | LVA | Daniels Ontužāns (from (Germany) SC Freiburg II) |
| — | MF | SRB | Dragoljub Savić (from (Austria) Rapid Wien) |
| — | MF | NGA | Adewale Oladoye (from (Slovakia) Trenčín) |
| — | MF | JAM | Kenroy Campbell (from (Jamaica) Cavalier FC, later loaned to BFC Daugavpils) |
| — | MF | LVA | Markuss Alpēns (loan return from Tukums 2000) |
| — | MF | LVA | Jevgēņijs Miņins (from Super Nova) |
| — | FW | CIV | Ismaël Diomandé (loan return from BFC Daugavpils) |
| — | FW | LTU | Faustas Steponavičius (loan return from Tukums 2000, later loaned to (Bulgaria) Botev Plovdiv) |
| — | FW | SRB | Darko Lemajić (from (Belgium) Gent) |
| — | FW | GAB | Floriss Djave (from (Cyprus) Aris Limassol, was on loan at (Cyprus) ENP) |

Out: Note: Flags indicate national team as defined under FIFA eligibility rules; some limited exceptions apply. Players may hold more than one non-FIFA nationality.

| No. | Pos. | Nation | Player |
|---|---|---|---|
| — | GK | LVA | Frenks Orols (on loan to Tukums 2000) |
| — | DF | LVA | Kaspars Dubra (to (Lithuania) Panevėžys) |
| — | DF | SRB | Jovan Vlalukin (to (Serbia) TSC) |
| — | DF | LVA | Elvis Stuglis (to (Poland) Chrobry) |
| — | MF | LTU | Karolis Uzėla (to (Lithuania) Kauno Žalgiris) |
| — | MF | JPN | Mikaze Nagasawa (on loan to Tukums 2000) |
| — | MF | BRA | Pedro Arthur (on loan to Tukums 2000) |
| — | MF | JAM | Kenroy Campbell (on loan to BFC Daugavpils) |
| — | MF | LVA | Jevgēņijs Miņins (on loan to Super Nova) |
| — | FW | LTU | Faustas Steponavičius (on loan to (Bulgaria) Botev Plovdiv) |
| — | FW | LVA | Rodrigo Gaučis (on loan to Tukums 2000) |
| — | FW | BRA | Leo Gaucho (to Valmiera) |
| — | FW | LVA | Efraims Valutadatils (on loan to BFC Daugavpils) |
| — | FW | BIH | Aleksej Golijanin (on loan to (Serbia) Novi Pazar) |
| — | FW | SRB | Andrej Ilić (to (Norway) Vålerenga) |

=== Liepāja ===
In: Note: Flags indicate national team as defined under FIFA eligibility rules; some limited exceptions apply. Players may hold more than one non-FIFA nationality.

| No. | Pos. | Nation | Player |
|---|---|---|---|
| — | GK | LVA | Dāvis Ošs (Free agent) |
| — | DF | SEN | Bacary Sané (from (Senegal) Diambars) |
| — | DF | SEN | Bilaly Diallo (from (Senegal) Diambars) |
| — | DF | SEN | Cheikh Faye (from (Senegal) Diambars) |
| — | MF | LVA | Roberts Meļķis (from Tukums 2000) |
| — | MF | LVA | Danila Patijčuks (from Jelgava) |
| — | MF | SEN | Mame Tine (from (Senegal) Diambars) |
| — | MF | GEO | Nikoloz Tskhovrebashvili (on loan from (Georgia (country)) Dinamo Tbilisi) |
| — | MF | GEO | Davit Samurkasovi (from (Georgia (country)) Torpedo Kutaisi) |
| — | FW | SEN | Mouhamadou Diaw (from (Senegal) Diambars) |

Out: Note: Flags indicate national team as defined under FIFA eligibility rules; some limited exceptions apply. Players may hold more than one non-FIFA nationality.

| No. | Pos. | Nation | Player |
|---|---|---|---|
| — | GK | LVA | Krišjānis Zviedris (to (Finland) SJK) |
| — | DF | LVA | Jānis Krautmanis (on loan to Grobiņas SC/LFS) |
| — | DF | USA | Noah Toribio (released) |
| — | DF | UKR | Glib Grachov (to (Georgia (country)) Saburtalo Tbilisi) |
| — | MF | LVA | Maksims Fjodorovs (on loan to Grobiņas SC/LFS) |
| — | MF | COD | Gauthier Mankenda (to Riga FC) |
| — | MF | SVN | Nik Kapun (released) |
| — | MF | CMR | Joseph Minala (to (Malta) Sliema) |
| — | MF | LVA | Mārtiņš Ķigurs (released) |
| — | MF | UKR | Artem Bilyi (to (Slovenia) Celje) |
| — | FW | LVA | Armans Muradjans (on loan to Grobiņas SC/LFS) |

=== FK Auda ===
In: Note: Flags indicate national team as defined under FIFA eligibility rules; some limited exceptions apply. Players may hold more than one non-FIFA nationality.

| No. | Pos. | Nation | Player |
|---|---|---|---|
| — | DF | LVA | Iļja Korotkovs (from Riga FC) |
| — | DF | LVA | Armands Pētersons (from Riga FC) |
| — | DF | SEN | Bakary Diawara (on loan from Riga FC) |
| — | DF | SEN | Amadou Ndiaye (from (Senegal) AS Pikine) |
| — | DF | LVA | Krišs Kārkliņš (Free agent) |
| — | DF | FRA | Wilguens Paugain (from (Cyprus) Akritas) |
| — | MF | LVA | Oskars Rubenis (from Jelgava) |
| — | MF | CIV | Ibrahim Pekegnon Kone (from (Cyprus) Akritas) |
| — | MF | CIV | Brahima Ouattara (from (Switzerland) Neuchâtel Xamax) |
| — | MF | POR | Matheus Clemente (from (Cyprus) Akritas) |
| — | MF | CIV | Aboubakar Karamoko (loan return from Riga FC, later on loan to (United Arab Emirates) Dubai United) |
| — | FW | BRA | Reginaldo (on loan from Riga FC) |

Out: Note: Flags indicate national team as defined under FIFA eligibility rules; some limited exceptions apply. Players may hold more than one non-FIFA nationality.

| No. | Pos. | Nation | Player |
|---|---|---|---|
| — | GK | CMR | Fabrice Ondoa (to (France) Nîmes) |
| — | DF | SWE | Doug Bergqvist (loan return to Riga FC, later to (Sweden) Degerfor) |
| — | DF | LVA | Iļja Semjonovs (to Mārupe) |
| — | MF | LVA | Raivis Skrebels (to SK Super Nova) |
| — | MF | LVA | Deniss Meļņiks (on loan to Riga FC) |
| — | MF | CIV | Aboubakar Karamoko (on loan to (United Arab Emirates) Dubai United) |
| — | FW | BUL | Georgi Minchev (released) |

=== FK Tukums 2000 ===
In: Note: Flags indicate national team as defined under FIFA eligibility rules; some limited exceptions apply. Players may hold more than one non-FIFA nationality.

| No. | Pos. | Nation | Player |
|---|---|---|---|
| — | GK | LVA | Frenks Orols (on loan from RFS) |
| — | DF | TUN | Maroine Mihoubi (from (Denmark) Jammerbugt FC) |
| — | MF | UKR | Ivan Koshkosh (from (Ukraine) FC Mariupol) |
| — | MF | JPN | Mikaze Nagasawa (on loan from RFS) |
| — | FW | BRA | Pedro Arthur (on loan from RFS) |
| — | FW | LVA | Rodrigo Gaučis (on loan from RFS) |
| — | FW | LVA | Kristiāns Kaušelis (from Valmiera, was on loan at Super Nova) |

Out: Note: Flags indicate national team as defined under FIFA eligibility rules; some limited exceptions apply. Players may hold more than one non-FIFA nationality.

| No. | Pos. | Nation | Player |
|---|---|---|---|
| — | GK | LVA | Sergejs Vilkovs (loan return to RFS) |
| — | GK | LVA | Leonards Čevers (to (Italy) San Marzano Calcio) |
| — | DF | LVA | Daniels Grauds (Retired) |
| — | MF | LVA | Roberts Meļķis (to Liepāja) |
| — | MF | LVA | Daniels Mīļais (released) |
| — | MF | LVA | Markuss Alpēns (loan return to RFS) |
| — | MF | LVA | Artjoms Šaboha (released) |
| — | MF | LVA | Ingars Sarmis Stuglis (to (Norway) HIF/Stein) |
| — | FW | LTU | Faustas Steponavičius (loan return to RFS, later loaned to (Bulgaria) Botev Plovdiv) |

=== BFC Daugavpils ===
In: Note: Flags indicate national team as defined under FIFA eligibility rules; some limited exceptions apply. Players may hold more than one non-FIFA nationality.

| No. | Pos. | Nation | Player |
|---|---|---|---|
| — | MF | NGA | Onyeka Chukwu (from (Nigeria) J14 FC) |
| — | MF | JAM | Kenroy Campbell (on loan from RFS) |
| — | FW | LVA | Efraims Valutadatils (on loan from RFS) |

Out: Note: Flags indicate national team as defined under FIFA eligibility rules; some limited exceptions apply. Players may hold more than one non-FIFA nationality.

| No. | Pos. | Nation | Player |
|---|---|---|---|
| — | MF | AZE | Nazim Hasanzade (loan return to (Azerbaijan) Turan Tovuz) |
| — | MF | LVA | Gļebs Žaleiko (loan return to RFS) |
| — | FW | CIV | Ismaël Diomandé (loan return to RFS) |
| — | FW | CMR | William Mukwelle (to (Czech Republic) Pardubice) |

=== Metta ===
In: Note: Flags indicate national team as defined under FIFA eligibility rules; some limited exceptions apply. Players may hold more than one non-FIFA nationality.

| No. | Pos. | Nation | Player |
|---|---|---|---|
| — | MF | LVA | Deniss Stradiņš (from (Austria) FCM Flyeralarm Traiskirchen) |
| — | FW | JPN | Takaya Sasaki (from Mārupe) |
| — | FW | LVA | Dans Sirbu (from Riga II) |
| — | FW | SEN | Yaya Kamara (from (Senegal) Guédiawaye FC) |

Out: Note: Flags indicate national team as defined under FIFA eligibility rules; some limited exceptions apply. Players may hold more than one non-FIFA nationality.

| No. | Pos. | Nation | Player |
|---|---|---|---|
| — | GK | LVA | Ņikita Parfjonovs (on loan to (Cyprus) Akritas) |

=== SK Super Nova ===
In: Note: Flags indicate national team as defined under FIFA eligibility rules; some limited exceptions apply. Players may hold more than one non-FIFA nationality.

| No. | Pos. | Nation | Player |
|---|---|---|---|
| — | GK | LVA | Dāvis Veisbuks (from Valmiera) |
| — | DF | UKR | Denys Prytykovskyi (from (Lithuania) FK Neptūnas) |
| — | DF | LVA | Emīls Aivars (from FK Dinamo Rīga) |
| — | DF | CMR | Mike Priso (on loan from (Spain) Leganés B) |
| — | DF | UGA | Allan Enyou (on loan from (Spain) Leganés B) |
| — | MF | LVA | Raivis Skrebels (from Auda) |
| — | MF | UKR | Yevgeniy Terzi (from (Malta) Santa Lucia) |
| — | MF | LVA | Aleksejs Gušča (from FK Dinamo Rīga) |
| — | MF | CMR | Rostand Ndjiki (on loan from (Spain) Leganés B) |
| — | MF | LVA | Jevgēņijs Miņins (on loan from RFS) |
| — | FW | LVA | Kārlis Rūja (from AFA Olaine) |
| — | FW | NGA | Ahanna Grant Williams (on loan from (Czech Republic) Vyškov) |
| — | FW | SSD | Dani Lual Gumnok (on loan from (Czech Republic) Vyškov) |

Out: Note: Flags indicate national team as defined under FIFA eligibility rules; some limited exceptions apply. Players may hold more than one non-FIFA nationality.

| No. | Pos. | Nation | Player |
|---|---|---|---|
| — | DF | LVA | Artūrs Ļotčikovs (released) |
| — | DF | LVA | Roberts Zelmanis (to FS Jelgava) |
| — | DF | LVA | Roberts Jaunarājs-Janvāris (to PPK/Betsafe) |
| — | DF | LVA | Artjoms Černovs (to (Czech Republic) SK Slavia Prague U-17) |
| — | MF | LVA | Ričards Korzāns (released) |
| — | MF | LVA | Ričards Rullis (released) |
| — | MF | LVA | Jevgēņijs Miņins (to RFS) |
| — | FW | LVA | Deniss Rakels (to (Poland) Hutnik Kraków) |
| — | FW | LVA | Kristiāns Kaušelis (loan return to Valmiera, later to Tukums 2000) |
| — | FW | LVA | Aļģirdas Gražis (released) |
| — | FW | LVA | Roberts Kukulis (to (Italy) Inter U-17) |

=== Jelgava ===
In: Note: Flags indicate national team as defined under FIFA eligibility rules; some limited exceptions apply. Players may hold more than one non-FIFA nationality.

| No. | Pos. | Nation | Player |
|---|---|---|---|
| — | DF | LVA | Roberts Zelmanis (from Super Nova) |
| — | MF | JPN | Ryuga Nakamura (from (Lithuania) Hegelmann) |
| — | MF | JPN | Ikuto Gomi (from (Lithuania) Dainava) |

Out: Note: Flags indicate national team as defined under FIFA eligibility rules; some limited exceptions apply. Players may hold more than one non-FIFA nationality.

| No. | Pos. | Nation | Player |
|---|---|---|---|
| — | DF | LVA | Daniels Grauds (to Tukums 2000) |
| — | DF | UKR | Yehor Smirnov (to (Gibraltar) Lynx) |
| — | MF | LVA | Danila Patijčuks (to Liepāja) |
| — | MF | LVA | Oskars Rubenis (to Auda) |
