= Roberts Ozols (footballer) =

Latvian footballer (born 1995)

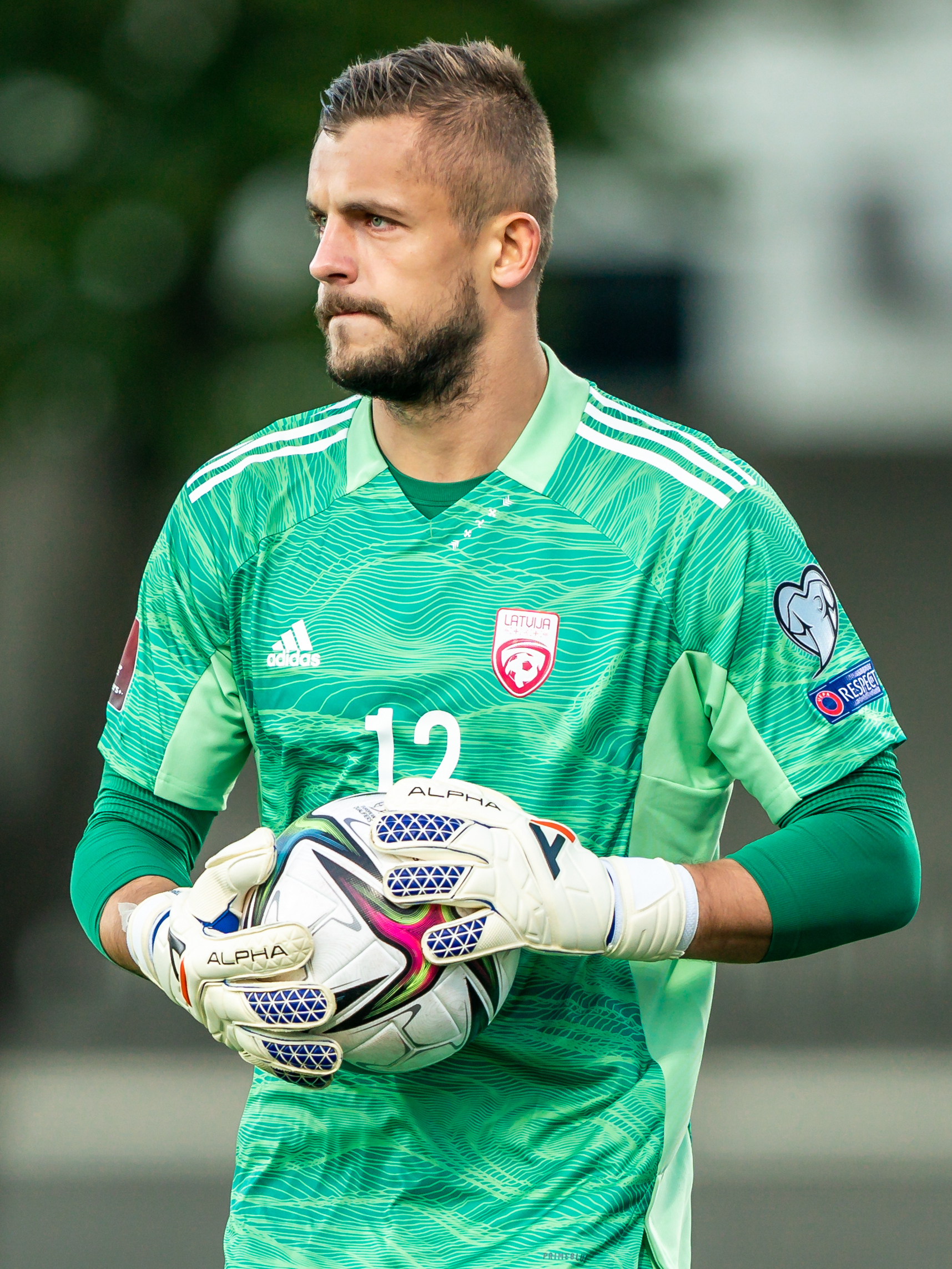
- Ozols with Latvia in 2021

Personal information
- Full name: Roberts Ozols
- Date of birth: 10 September 1995 (age 31)
- Place of birth: Kuldīga, Latvia
- Height: 1.87 m (6 ft 2 in)
- Position: Goalkeeper

Team information
- Current team: Grobiņa
- Number: 21

Senior career*
Years	Team	Apps	(Gls)
2013	Liepājas Metalurgs II	2	(0)
2013–2014	Spartaks Jūrmala	9	(0)
2014–2015	Daugava	11	(0)
2015–2023	Riga	105	(0)
2023	Auda	19	(0)
2024	Qizilqum Zarafshon	23	(0)
2025	Auda	15	(0)
2026	Bylis	12	(0)
2026–	Grobiņa	17	(0)

International career^{‡}
2020–	Latvia	19	(0)
- * Club domestic league appearances and goals as of 12 November 2026 ‡ National team caps and goals as of 10:00, 18 November 2023 (UTC)

Roberts Ozols (born 10 September 1995) is a Latvian footballer who plays as a goalkeeper for Grobiņa and the Latvia national team.

== Career ==
In March 2023, Ozols signed for Auda after eight years with Riga.

Ozols made his international debut for Latvia on 7 October 2020 in a friendly match against Montenegro.

== Career statistics ==
=== International ===
As of 18 November 2023

Latvia
Year	Apps	Goals
2020	4	0
2021	10	0
2022	1	0
2023	4	0
2024	0	0
Total	19	0

== Honours ==
- Latvian First League: 2015
- Latvian Football Cup: 2018
- Latvian Higher League: 2018, 2019, 2020
