= Krišjānis Zviedris =

Latvian footballer (born 1997)

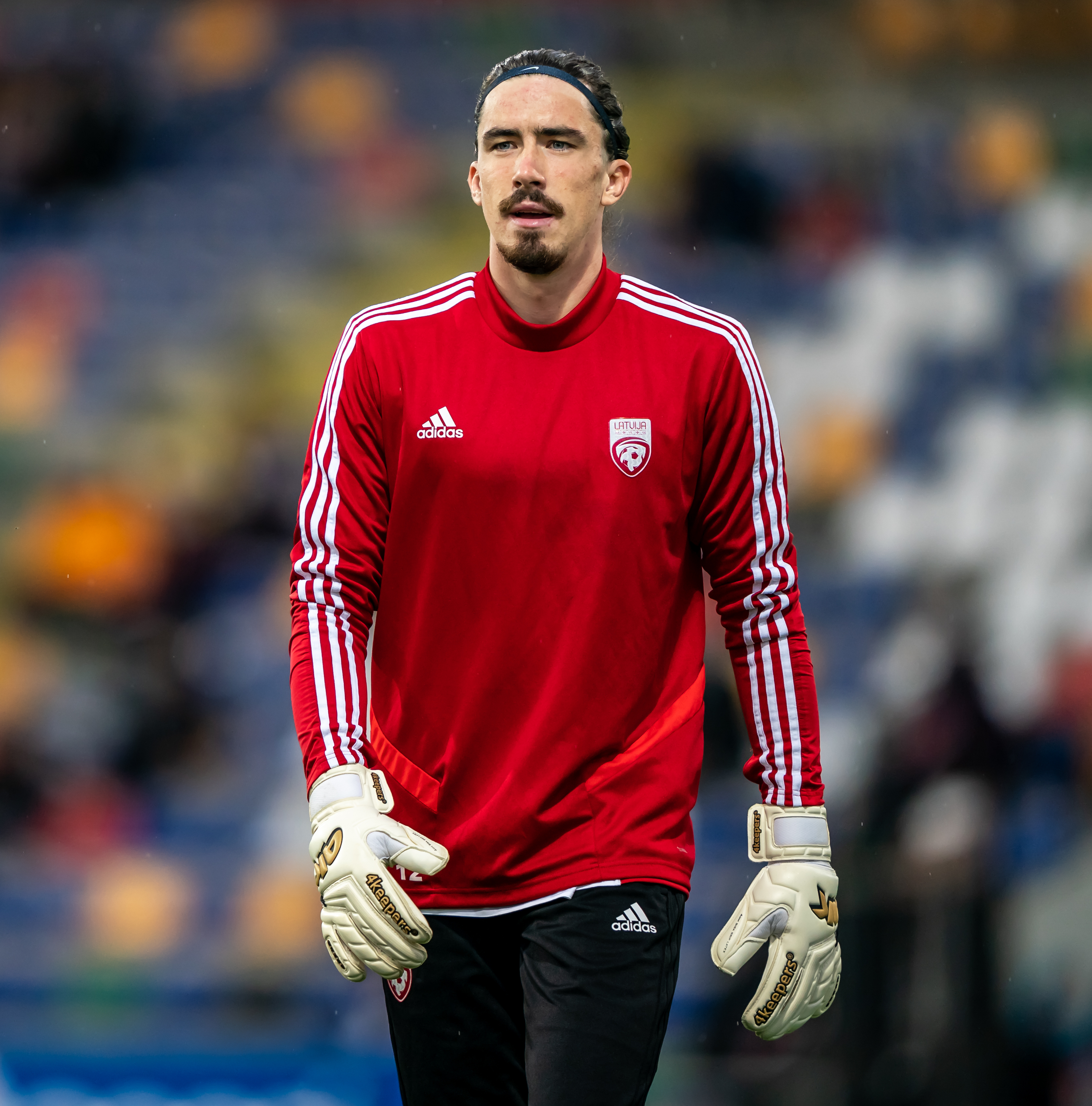

Personal information
- Date of birth: 25 January 1997 (age 29)
- Place of birth: Kuldīga, Latvia
- Height: 1.88 m (6 ft 2 in)
- Position: Goalkeeper

Team information
- Current team: Riga
- Number: 1

Senior career*
Years	Team	Apps	(Gls)
2015–2023	Liepāja	87	(0)
2015–2017	→ Liepāja II	50	(0)
2019	→ Atlantas (on loan)	6	(0)
2023	SJK	5	(0)
2024	Auda	24	(0)
2025–	Riga	49	(0)

International career^{‡}
2021–	Latvia	7	(0)
- * Club domestic league appearances and goals as of 12 November 2026 ‡ National team caps and goals as of 12 June 2026

Krišjānis Zviedris (born 25 January 1997) is a Latvian footballer who plays as a goalkeeper for Riga and the Latvia national team.

== Club career ==
In July 2023, Zviedris signed with Finnish Veikkausliiga club SJK Seinäjoki for the remainder of the season, with a two-year option. He left the club after the season.

== International career ==
On 18 March 2021 Zviedris have been called up for Latvia national team for the 2022 FIFA World Cup qualification (UEFA) matches against Montenegro, Netherlands and Turkey.

== Career statistics ==
As of 12 November 2026.

Appearances and goals by club, season and competition
Club	Season	League			Cup (Note: Includes Latvian Cup and Lithuanian Cup)		Europe		Total	
Club	Season	Division	Apps	Goals	Apps	Goals	Apps	Goals	Apps	Goals
Liepāja	2016	Virslīga	1	0	0	0	0	0	1	0
Liepāja	2017	Virslīga	0	0	1	0	–		1	0
Liepāja	2018	Virslīga	12	0	1	0	0	0	13	0
Liepāja	2019	Virslīga	3	0	1	0	0	0	4	0
Liepāja	2020	Virslīga	12	0	0	0	–		12	0
Liepāja	2021	Virslīga	21	0	2	0	4 (Note: Appearance(s) in UEFA Conference League)	0	27	0
Liepāja	2022	Virslīga	36	0	0	0	4	0	40	0
Liepāja	Total		85	0	5	0	8	0	98	0
Atlantas (on loan)	2019	A Lyga	6	0	1	0	–		7	0
SJK	2023	Veikkausliiga	5	0	–		–		5	0
SJK Akatemia	2023	Ykkönen	1	0	–		–		1	0
Auda	2024	Virslīga	24	0	3	0	6	0	33	0
Riga	2025	Virslīga	34	0	2	0	6	0	42	0
Riga	2026	Virslīga	15	0	1	0	2 (Note: Appearance(s) in UEFA Champions League)	0	18	0
Riga	Total		49	0	3	0	8	0	60	0
Career total			170	0	12	0	22	0	204	0
