= Kamil Biliński =

Polish footballer (born 1988)

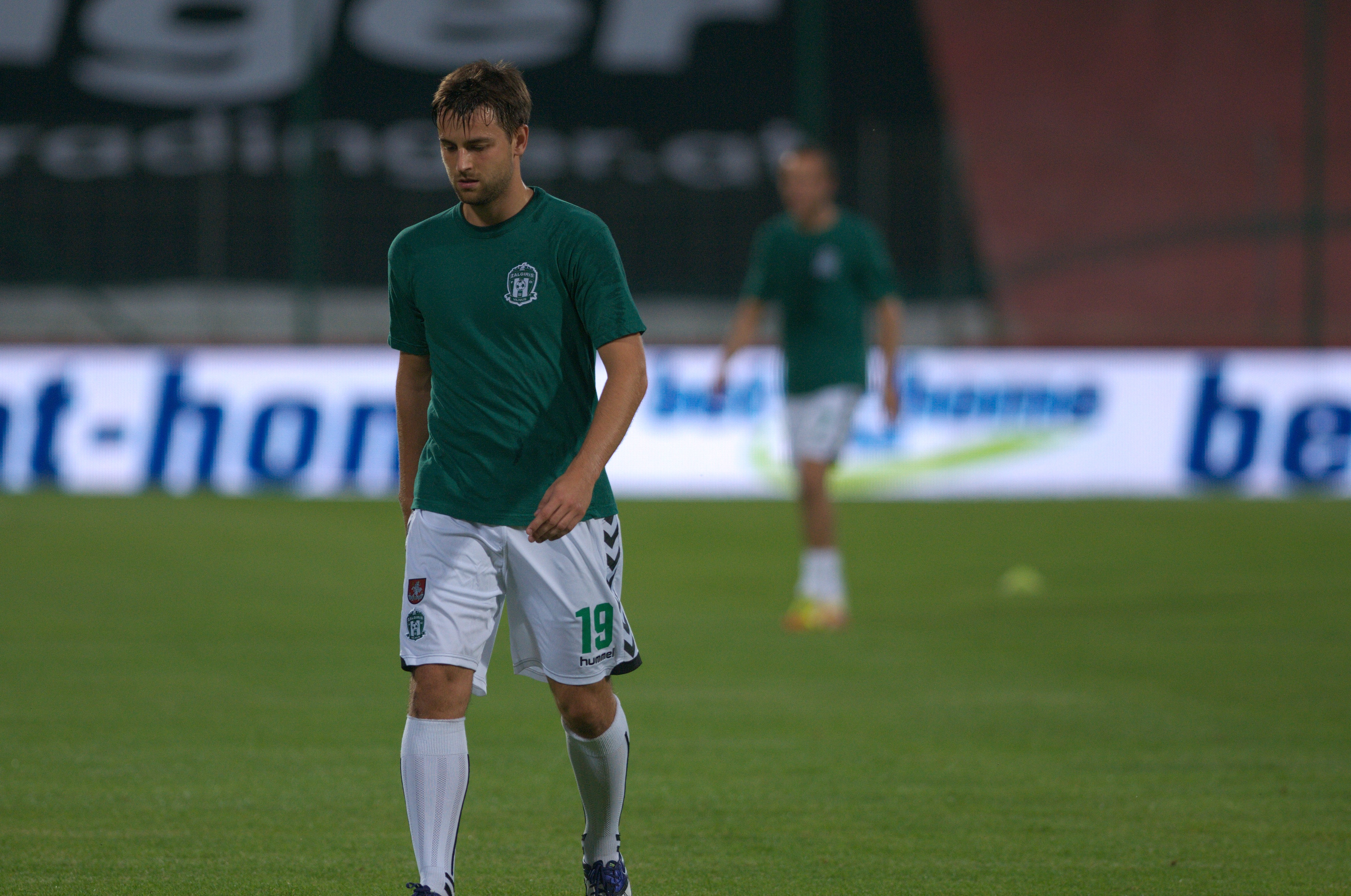
- Biliński with Žalgiris in 2012

Personal information
- Date of birth: 23 January 1988 (age 38)
- Place of birth: Wrocław, Poland
- Height: 1.81 m (5 ft 11 in)
- Position: Striker

Team information
- Current team: Zagłębie Sosnowiec II (player-assistant)
- Number: 9

Youth career
- 2002–2006: Śląsk Wrocław

Senior career*
Years	Team	Apps	(Gls)
2006–2012	Śląsk Wrocław	26	(1)
2007	→ Gawin Królewska (loan)	4	(0)
2010	→ Znicz Pruszków (loan)	11	(4)
2010	→ Górnik Polkowice (loan)	13	(0)
2011–2012	→ Wisła Płock (loan)	50	(22)
2012–2013	Žalgiris	46	(33)
2014–2015	Dinamo București	43	(15)
2015–2017	Śląsk Wrocław	63	(16)
2017–2018	Wisła Płock	18	(5)
2018–2019	Riga	28	(7)
2020–2023	Podbeskidzie	104	(48)
2023–2025	Zagłębie Sosnowiec	63	(21)
2026	KS Goczałkowice-Zdrój	13	(1)
2026–	Zagłębie Sosnowiec II	1	(0)

International career
2008	Poland U21	1	(0)
- * Club domestic league appearances and goals as of 13:12, 16 August 2026 (UTC)

Kamil Biliński (born 23 January 1988) is a Polish professional footballer who plays as a striker and serves as an assistant for Zagłębie Sosnowiec II. He is also the assistant coach of Zagłębie's under-16 team.

== Club career ==
Biliński was born on 23 January 1988 in the city of Wrocław. He began his senior career with Śląsk Wrocław in 2006, where he spent six seasons and took part in 26 league games.

From 2007 to 2013, he played for clubs such as Górnik Polkowice, Znicz Pruszków, Wisła Płock and Žalgiris.

=== Dinamo București ===
On 3 January 2014, it was announced that Romanian side Dinamo București had reached an agreement for the transfer of Biliński, signing a 2 1/2-year deal for €530,000. In June 2015, he was released by Dinamo, a year before his contract expired.

== International career ==
He was a part of Poland national under-21 team.

== Honours ==
Śląsk Wrocław

- Ekstraklasa Cup: 2008–09

Žalgiris

- A Lyga: 2013
- Lithuanian Cup: 2012–13
- Lithuanian Supercup: 2013

Riga

- Latvian Higher League: 2018, 2019
- Latvian Cup: 2018

Individual

- Młoda Ekstraklasa top scorer: 2008–09
- Žalgiris Vilnius Player of the Year: 2012, 2013
- Liga I Player of the Month: March 2015
- I liga top scorer: 2021–22
- I liga Player of the Year: 2021
- I liga Player of the Month: October 2021, November 2021
