= Bogdan Vaštšuk =

Estonian footballer (born 1995)

Personal information
- Date of birth: 4 October 1995 (age 31)
- Place of birth: Tallinn, Estonia
- Height: 1.85 m (6 ft 1 in)
- Position: Attacking midfielder

Team information
- Current team: Nõmme Kalju
- Number: 59

Youth career
- 2002–2010: Infonet
- 2012–2013: Dynamo Moscow
- 2013–2016: Reading

Senior career*
Years	Team	Apps	(Gls)
2011	Infonet	13	(3)
2015–2016	Reading	0	(0)
2015–2016	→ Farnborough (loan)	20	(15)
2016–2019	Riga	37	(11)
2018–2019	→ Levski Sofia (loan)	10	(0)
2019–2022	Levadia Tallinn	71	(15)
2022	→ Vorskla Poltava (loan)	0	(0)
2022–2023	Stal Mielec	5	(0)
2023	Sligo Rovers	8	(0)
2023–2024	Voždovac	15	(1)
2024–2025	Al-Shabab		
2025–2026	Koper	4	(0)
2026–	Nõmme Kalju	18	(2)

International career
2010	Estonia U16	2	(0)
2010–2011	Estonia U17	7	(0)
2013	Estonia U19	5	(1)
2014–2015	Estonia U21	8	(2)
2021–2023	Estonia	15	(0)
- * Club domestic league appearances and goals as of 17 November 2026

Bogdan Vaštšuk (born 4 October 1995) is an Estonian professional footballer who plays as an attacking midfielder for Meistriliiga club Nõmme Kalju.

== Club career ==
=== Reading ===
In early January 2016, Vaštšuk returned to Reading following his loan deal with Farnborough.

On 9 May 2016, Reading confirmed that they would not be renewing Vaštšuk's contract.

=== Riga ===
On 24 August 2016, Vaštšuk signed for Riga FC.

==== Loan to Levski Sofia ====
On 21 August 2018, Levski Sofia announced the signing of Vaštšuk on loan for the 2018–19 season, with an option to make the move permanent at the end of the season.

=== Levadia ===
On 23 August 2019, Vaštšuk signed for FCI Levadia.

=== Stal Mielec ===
On 20 July 2022, he joined Ekstraklasa side Stal Mielec on a two-year contract.

=== Sligo Rovers ===
On 5 January 2023, Vaštšuk signed for League of Ireland Premier Division club Sligo Rovers on a two-year deal with the option of a third. On 18 July 2023, it was announced that Vaštšuk's contract had been mutually terminated after making just 8 appearances in the clubs 24 games up to that point.

== International career ==
He made his debut for Estonia national football team on 24 March 2021 in a World Cup qualifier against the Czech Republic.

== Personal life ==
Vaštšuk is of Ukrainian descent by his paternal grandparents, who are from Rivne and Donetsk Oblast in Ukraine.

== Career statistics ==
=== Club ===
As of match played 1 March 2024

Appearances and goals by club, season and competition
Club	Season	League			National cup (Note: Includes Latvian Football Cup, Bulgarian Cup, Estonian Cup, Polish Cup and Serbian Cup)		Continental		Other		Total	
Club	Season	Division	Apps	Goals	Apps	Goals	Apps	Goals	Apps	Goals	Apps	Goals
Infonet	2011	Esiliiga	13	3	—		—		—		13	3
Reading	2015–16	Football League Championship	0	0	—		—		—		0	0
Farnborough (loan)	2015–16	Isthmian League	20	15	—		—		—		20	15
Riga	2016	Virslīga	5	3	0	0	—		—		5	3
Riga	2017	Virslīga	23	8	6	1	—		—		29	9
Riga	2018	Virslīga	9	0	1	0	1 (Note: Appearance in UEFA Europa League)	0	—		11	0
Riga	Total		37	11	7	1	1	0	—		45	12
Levski Sofia (loan)	2018–19	Parva Liga	10	0	1	0	0	0	—		11	0
Levadia Tallinn	2019	Meistriliiga	6	0	—		—		—		6	0
Levadia Tallinn	2020	Meistriliiga	27	7	1	1	—		—		28	8
Levadia Tallinn	2021	Meistriliiga	26	6	3	2	2 (Note: Appearances in UEFA Europa Conference League)	2	—		31	10
Levadia Tallinn	2022	Meistriliiga	12	2	1	0	0	0	—		13	2
Levadia Tallinn	Total		71	15	5	3	2	2	—		78	20
Vorskla Poltava (loan)	2021–22	Ukrainian Premier League	0	0	—		—		—		0	0
Stal Mielec	2022–23	Ekstraklasa	5	0	1	1	—		—		6	1
Sligo Rovers	2023	League of Ireland Premier Division	8	0	—		—		—		8	0
Voždovac	2023–24	Serbian SuperLiga	15	1	2	1	—		—		17	2
Al-Shabab	2023–24	Kuwait Premier League	1	1	—		—		—		1	1
Career total			180	46	16	6	3	2	—		199	54

=== International ===
As of match played 19 November 2023

Appearances and goals by national team and year
National team	Year	Apps	Goals
Estonia
Estonia	2021	7	0
Estonia	2022	4	0
Estonia	2023	4	0
Total		15	0

== Honours ==
Riga

- Latvian Higher League: 2018
- Latvian Football Cup: 2018

Levadia Tallinn

- Meistriliiga: 2021
- Estonian Cup: 2020–21

Individual

- Meistriliiga Player of the Month: April 2022
- Meistriliiga Goal of the Month: April 2022
