= Ivan Yenin =

Russian footballer

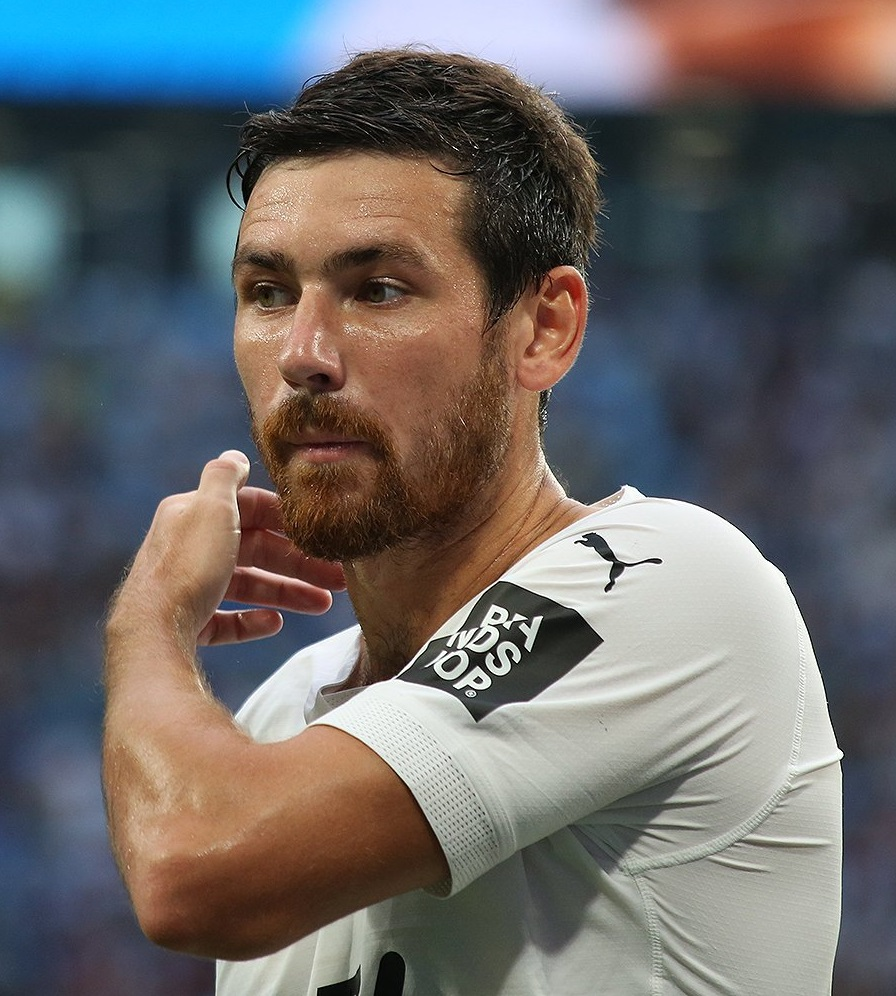
- Yenin with Torpedo Moscow in 2022

Personal information
- Full name: Ivan Vladimirovich Yenin
- Date of birth: 6 February 1994 (age 32)
- Place of birth: Kherson, Ukraine
- Height: 1.80 m (5 ft 11 in)
- Position: Midfielder

Team information
- Current team: Arsenal Tula
- Number: 35

Youth career
- 2004–2011: Vityaz Podolsk

Senior career*
Years	Team	Apps	(Gls)
2012–2016	Vityaz Podolsk	100	(2)
2016	→ Riga (loan)	15	(0)
2017–2018	Riga	43	(0)
2019–2020	Široki Brijeg	30	(2)
2020–2021	Zrinjski Mostar	28	(1)
2021–2023	Torpedo Moscow	66	(2)
2024–2025	Chernomorets Novorossiysk	42	(2)
2025–2026	Spartak Kostroma	33	(1)
2026–	Arsenal Tula	0	(0)
- * Club domestic league appearances and goals as of 16 May 2026

Ivan Vladimirovich Yenin (Russian: Иван Владимирович Енин; born 6 February 1994) is a Russian professional footballer who plays as a midfielder for Arsenal Tula.

== Club career ==
With Riga, Yenin won the 2018 Virslīga and the 2018 Latvian Cup, while in the 2018–19 Bosnian Cup season with Široki, he finished as a runner-up, losing to Sarajevo in the final.

He made his debut in the Russian Football National League for Torpedo Moscow on 10 July 2021 in a game against Kuban Krasnodar. Yenin made his Russian Premier League debut for Torpedo on 17 July 2022 against Sochi.

== Honours ==
Riga

- Latvian Higher League: 2018
- Latvian Football Cup: 2018

Torpedo Moscow

- Russian First League: 2021–22

== Career statistics ==
As of 16 May 2026

Club	Season	League			Cup		Continental		Other		Total	
Club	Season	Division	Apps	Goals	Apps	Goals	Apps	Goals	Apps	Goals	Apps	Goals
Vityaz Podolsk	2011–12	Russian Second League	8	0	–		–		–		8	0
Vityaz Podolsk	2012–13	Russian Second League	14	0	2	0	–		–		16	0
Vityaz Podolsk	2013–14	Russian Second League	26	1	2	0	–		–		28	1
Vityaz Podolsk	2014–15	Russian Second League	26	1	2	0	–		–		28	1
Vityaz Podolsk	2015–16	Russian Second League	26	0	1	0	–		–		27	0
Vityaz Podolsk	Total		100	2	7	0	0	0	0	0	107	2
Riga	2016	Latvian Higher League	15	0	0	0	–		–		15	0
Riga	2017	Latvian Higher League	22	0	8	0	–		–		30	0
Riga	2018	Latvian Higher League	21	0	3	0	2 (Note: Appearances in UEFA Europa League)	0	5 (Note: Appearances in FNL Cup)	0	31	0
Riga	Total		58	0	11	0	2	0	5	0	76	0
Široki Brijeg	2018–19	Premijer liga	13	1	5	0	–		–		18	1
Široki Brijeg	2019–20	Premijer liga	17	1	1	1	2	1	–		20	3
Široki Brijeg	Total		30	2	6	1	2	1	0	0	38	4
Zrinjski Mostar	2020–21	Premijer liga	28	1	3	0	3	0	–		34	1
Torpedo Moscow	2021–22	Russian First League	32	2	1	0	–		–		33	2
Torpedo Moscow	2022–23	Russian Premier League	22	0	5	0	–		–		27	0
Torpedo Moscow	2023–24	Russian First League	12	0	0	0	–		–		12	0
Torpedo Moscow	Total		66	2	6	0	0	0	0	0	72	2
Chernomorets	2023–24	Russian First League	13	1	–		–		–		13	1
Chernomorets	2024–25	Russian First League	29	1	0	0	–		–		29	1
Chernomorets	Total		42	2	0	0	0	0	0	0	42	2
Spartak Kostroma	2025–26	Russian First League	33	1	0	0	–		–		33	1
Career total			357	10	33	1	7	1	5	0	402	12
