= Oļegs Laizāns =

Latvian footballer

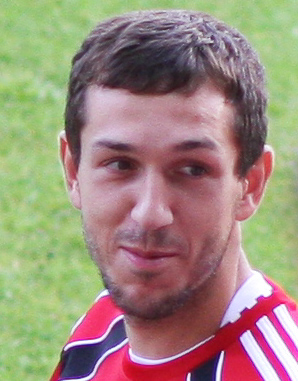
- Oļegs Laizāns in training

Personal information
- Full name: Oļegs Laizāns
- Date of birth: 28 March 1987 (age 39)
- Place of birth: Riga, Latvian SSR, USSR (now Republic of Latvia)
- Height: 1.86 m (6 ft 1 in)
- Position: Midfielder

Youth career
- JFC Skonto

Senior career*
Years	Team	Apps	(Gls)
2005–2011	Skonto Riga	56	(11)
2010	→ Lechia Gdańsk (loan)	8	(1)
2010	→ Gulbene (loan)	7	(4)
2011–2012	Ventspils	30	(3)
2012	ŁKS Łódź	9	(0)
2012–2015	Yenisey Krasnoyarsk	81	(5)
2015	Ventspils	12	(1)
2016–2022	Riga	44	(1)
2021	→ Auda (loan)	5	(0)
2022–2023	Spartaks Jūrmala	36	(7)
2023–2024	Super Nova	26	(1)

International career
- Latvia U19
- Latvia U21
2011–2019	Latvia	54	(0)
- * Club domestic league appearances and goals as of 15 November 2023

Oļegs Laizāns (born 28 March 1987) is a Latvian former professional footballer.

== Club career ==
=== Early career, Skonto and loans ===
As a young player Oļegs Laizāns played for JFC Skonto, being taken to the first team in 2005. He played there for 5 and a half years before being loaned to the Polish Ekstraklasa club Lechia Gdańsk and Latvian First League team FB Gulbene-2005 in 2010. While on loan Laizāns played 8 matches and scored 1 goal in Poland, whilst in Latvia he played 7 games and scored 4 times. In 2010, he helped FB Gulbene-2005 to win the Latvian First League championship and qualify for the Latvian Higher League for the first time in the history of the club. In 2006, he was named the best young player of the year. IN total over five and a half years Laizāns played 56 matches, scoring 11 goals for Skonto Riga in the Latvian football championship before being released at the start of 2011. With Skonto he reached the second place in the league in 2005 and was runner-up for the Latvian Cup in 2006 but didn't win any major trophies.

=== FK Ventspils ===
At the start of 2011, after some ups-and-downs in the football career, Oļegs was signed by another Latvian Higher League club FK Ventspils, who were completing their squad for the upcoming season. Right after joining Laizāns proved his ability, becoming a first eleven player. All in all he played 30 matches that season and scored 3 goals, also being elected the captain of the team. This year turned out to be really lucky, as he not only managed to become the champion of the league but also won the Latvian Cup. After a very good season he was included in both - LFF and sportacentrs.com championship all-star teams and was also named the biggest surprise of the season by fans via sportacentrs.com.

=== ŁKS Łódź ===
On 16 February 2012 Laizāns joined the Polish Ekstraklasa club ŁKS Łódź. He made his debut 2 days later in a league match against Polonia Warsaw, playing 90 minutes and collecting a yellow card in a 0–2 loss. All in all he played 9 league matches for LKS, leaving the team after its relegation to the I liga in July 2012.

=== Yenisey Krasnoyarsk ===
Laizāns joined the Russian National Football League club Yenisey Krasnoyarsk on 7 July 2012. In his first season with the club Laizāns scored 2 goals in 23 league matches.

== International career ==
Laizāns has represented Latvia at all youth level national teams and received his first call-up for the senior national team in 2011 for a friendly match against Finland on 10 August. He made a total of 54 appearances for Latvia, scoring no goals yet.

== Honours ==
Ventspils

- Latvian Higher League: 2011
- Latvian Cup: 2010–11

Riga

- Latvian Higher League: 2018, 2019, 2020
