= Roger (footballer, born 1996) =

Brazilian association football player

Personal information
- Full name: Roger Junio Rodrigues Ferreira
- Date of birth: 1 March 1996 (age 30)
- Place of birth: Goiânia, Brazil
- Height: 1.80 m (5 ft 11 in)
- Position: Midfielder

Team information
- Current team: Corvinul Hunedoara
- Number: 8

Youth career
- –2016: Vila Nova

Senior career*
Years	Team	Apps	(Gls)
2016–2017	Vila Nova	28	(2)
2017	→ Botafogo-PB (loan)	7	(0)
2017	→ Goiânia (loan)	0	(0)
2018	Atlético Clube Goianiense	7	(0)
2018–2019	Kukësi	0	(0)
2018–2019	→ Kastrioti (loan)	33	(10)
2019–2020	Riga	28	(7)
2021–2022	UTA Arad	49	(4)
2022–2023	CFR Cluj	19	(0)
2023	UTA Arad	14	(1)
2023	Al-Taraji	9	(4)
2024	Universitatea Cluj	17	(0)
2024	→ Corvinul Hunedoara (loan)	0	(0)
2025	Ypiranga	19	(2)
2026	North ES	0	(0)
2026–	Corvinul Hunedoara	5	(0)
- * Club domestic league appearances and goals as of 7 November 2026

Roger Junio Rodrigues Ferreira (born 1 March 1996), commonly known as Roger, is a Brazilian professional footballer who plays as a midfielder for Liga I club Corvinul Hunedoara.

== Career ==
On 2 July 2023, Roger joined Saudi club Al-Taraji.

== Career statistics ==
=== Club ===
As of 7 November 2026.

Club	Season	League			State League (Note: Includes Campeonato Goiano, Campeonato Paraibano, Campeonato Gaúcho, Campeonato Mineiro)		National cup (Note: Includes Latvian Cup, Cupa României)		Continental		Other		Total	
Club	Season	Division	Apps	Goals	Apps	Goals	Apps	Goals	Apps	Goals	Apps	Goals	Apps	Goals
Vila Nova	2016	Série B	20	1	8	1	0	0	–		2 (Note: Appearances in the Copa Verde)	0	30	2
Vila Nova	2017	Série B	0	0	0	0	0	0	–		0	0	0	0
Vila Nova	Total		20	1	8	1	0	0	0	0	2	0	30	2
Botafogo-PB (loan)	2017	–			7	0	0	0	–		3 (Note: Appearances in the Copa do Nordeste)	0	10	0
Atlético Clube Goianiense	2018	Série B	0	0	7	0	0	0	–		0	0	7	0
Kukësi	2018–19	Albanian Superliga	0	0	–		0	0	0	0	–		0	0
Kastrioti (loan)	2018–19	Albanian Superliga	33	10	–		0	0	–		–		33	10
Riga	2019	Virslīga	8	2	–		1	0	7 (Note: Two appearances in UEFA Champions League, five appearances in UEFA Europa League)	0	–		16	2
Riga	2020	Virslīga	20	5	–		2	0	2 (Note: One appearance in UEFA Champions League, one appearance in UEFA Europa League)	0	–		24	5
Riga	Total		28	7	0	0	3	0	9	0	0	0	40	7
UTA Arad	2020–21	Liga I	23	2	–		1	0	–		–		24	2
UTA Arad	2021–22	Liga I	26	2	–		1	0	–		–		27	2
UTA Arad	2022–23	Liga I	14	1	–		2	0	–		2 (Note: Appearances in Liga I promotion/relegation play-offs)	0	18	1
UTA Arad	Total		63	5	0	0	4	0	0	0	2	0	69	5
CFR Cluj	2021–22	Liga I	2	0	–		–		–		–		2	0
CFR Cluj	2022–23	Liga I	17	0	–		3	0	12 (Note: Two appearances in UEFA Champions League, ten appearances in UEFA Conference League)	0	1 (Note: Appearances in Supercupa României)	0	33	0
CFR Cluj	Total		19	0	0	0	3	0	12	0	1	0	35	0
Al-Taraji	2023–24	Saudi First Division League	9	4	–		0	0	–		–		9	4
Universitatea Cluj	2023–24	Liga I	17	0	–		2	0	–		2 (Note: Appearances in Liga I European play-offs)	0	21	0
Corvinul Hunedoara (loan)	2024–25	Liga II	–		–		–		4 (Note: Four appearances in UEFA Europa League, two appearances in the UEFA Conference League)	0	1	0	21	0
Ypiranga	2025	Série C	19	2	8	0	–		–		4 (Note: Appearances in the Troféu Farroupilha)	1	31	3
North ES	2026	Campeonato Mineiro	–		1	0	–		–		0	0	1	0
Corvinul Hunedoara	2026–27	Liga I	5	0	–		1	0	–		–		6	0
Career total			213	29	32	1	12	0	27	0	15	1	299	31

== Honours ==
Botafogo-PB

- Campeonato Paraibano: 2017

Riga FC

- Virslīga: 2019, 2020

CFR Cluj

- Liga I: 2021–22
- Supercupa României runner-up: 2022

Corvinul Hunedoara

- Supercupa României runner-up: 2024
