= Laizāns =

Laizāns is a surname. Notable people with the surname include:

- Juris Laizāns (born 1979), Latvian footballer
- Laimonis Laizāns (born 1945), Latvian footballer
- Oļegs Laizāns (born 1987), Latvian footballer
- Raimonds Laizāns (born 1964), Latvian footballer
