= Roman Debelko =

Ukrainian footballer

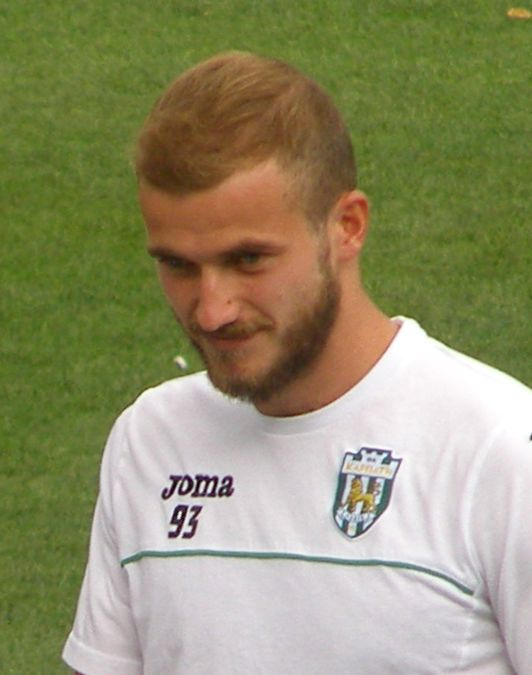

Personal information
- Full name: Roman Mykolayovych Debelko
- Date of birth: 8 August 1993 (age 33)
- Place of birth: Sopiv, Ivano-Frankivsk Oblast, Ukraine
- Height: 1.85 m (6 ft 1 in)
- Position: Forward

Team information
- Current team: UCSA Tarasivka
- Number: 27

Youth career
- 2007–2009: Prykarpattia Ivano-Frankivsk
- 2009–2010: Metalurh Donetsk

Senior career*
Years	Team	Apps	(Gls)
2009–2014	Metalurh Donetsk	0	(0)
2013	→ Banants Yerevan (loan)	10	(0)
2014–2017	Stal Kamianske	45	(7)
2017–2019	Karpaty Lviv	18	(2)
2018	→ Levadia Tallinn (loan)	36	(28)
2019–2020	Riga	27	(11)
2021	Shakhtyor Soligorsk	8	(2)
2021–2024	Kryvbas Kryvyi Rih	52	(11)
2024–	UCSA Tarasivka	18	(4)
- * Club domestic league appearances and goals as of 10 June 2025

Roman Mykolayovych Debelko (Ukrainian: Роман Миколайович Дебелко; born 8 August 1993) is a Ukrainian professional footballer who plays as a midfielder for UCSA Tarasivka.

== Career ==
Debelko is a product of the FC Prykarpattya and FC Metalurh Donetsk youth sportive schools.

== Honours ==
Shakhtyor Soligorsk

- Belarusian Premier League: 2021

Riga

- Latvian Higher League: (2) 2019, 2020

Levadia Tallinn

- Estonian Supercup: 2018

=== Individual ===
- Meistriliiga Player of the Month: March 2018
