= Darko Lemajić =

Serbian footballer (born 1993)

Personal information
- Date of birth: 20 August 1993 (age 33)
- Place of birth: Belgrade, FR Yugoslavia
- Height: 1.98 m (6 ft 6 in)
- Position: Striker

Team information
- Current team: RFS
- Number: 22

Youth career
- Inđija

Senior career*
Years	Team	Apps	(Gls)
2010–2014	Inđija	83	(20)
2015–2016	Napredak Kruševac	26	(3)
2016	→ Inđija (loan)	19	(5)
2017	Inđija	13	(7)
2017–2019	Riga	42	(23)
2019–2021	RFS	42	(20)
2021–2023	Gent	30	(6)
2023–	RFS	96	(59)

International career
2012	Serbia U19		
2012–2013	Serbia U20		
- * Club domestic league appearances and goals as of 12 November 2026

Darko Lemajić (Serbian Cyrillic: Дарко Лемајић; born 20 August 1993) is a Serbian professional footballer who plays as a forward for Latvian Higher League club RFS.

== Club career ==
=== Inđija ===
Born in Belgrade, Lemajić made his debut for Inđija, on away match versus Zemun in last fixture match of the 2009–10 Serbian First League, played 6 June 2010 against Zemun. He played his Serbian SuperLiga match in the 2010–11 season, against Vojvodina, played on 20 November 2010. He also played three more matches for the season. After the club relegated in the Serbian First League for the next season again, Lemajić collected 21 league and two cup matches, scoring four goals in both competitions. He was linked with Grasshoppers, and was on trial with another club in Switzerland, FC Aarau. Although he also was scouted by Italian club Parma, Lemajić stayed in Inđija. As like as the previous season, he played 21 matches in the 2012–13 Serbian First League season and scored three goals, but also played just one cup match for the season, without goals. During the 2013–14 season, Lemajić appeared on 27 league matches, scoring 9 goals. That score promoted him to the best team scorer and one of the most important players for surviving the club in the Serbian First League. Lemajić also started the 2014–15 season as the first team captain. He scored both goals in opening match for 2–0 home victory against Sloboda Užice. During the first half-season, he scored five goals on 10 matches, missing some period because of injury. After he spent the whole 2015 with Napredak Kruševac, Lemajić returned in his home club at the beginning of 2016 as a loaned player until the end of 2015–16 Serbian First League season. He also extended his loan in summer 2016 for a six months, and stayed with Inđija until the end of 2016. In the winter break off-season, Lemajić rejoined the club as a single-player.

=== Napredak Kruševac ===
Lemajić joined Napredak Kruševac at the beginning of 2015. During the first year he spent with club, Lemajić was mostly used as a back-up player. During the second half of 2014–15 season, he scored two goals on 13 league matches and also appeared in both play-off, after which Napredak relegated in the Serbian First League. For the rest of a year, Lemajić scored one Serbian First League goal on 11 caps. He also played two cup matches, against Moravac Mrštane when he scored two goals and was nominated for the man of the match, and Radnički Niš. In the winter break off-season, Lemajić was loaned to Inđija. He returned from loan in summer 2016 and started the 2016–17 Serbian SuperLiga season with Napredak, but later moved on new six-month loan to Inđija. In January 2017, Lemajić terminated the contract and left the club.

=== Riga ===
On 25 June 2017, Lemajić signed for Latvian club Riga. Lemajić became the top scorer of the 2018 Latvian Higher League, scoring 15 goals in 24 matches. He helped Riga win both - the league and the Latvian Cup - for the first time in the history of the club.

=== RFS ===
In June 2019, Lemajić joined FK RFS.

=== Gent ===
On 24 August 2021, Lemajić signed for Belgian club Gent on a 2-year contract for undisclosed fee.

=== RFS ===
On 1 July 2023, Lemajić joined FK RFS again.

== Career statistics ==
=== Club ===
As of 24 August 2021

Appearances and goals by club, season and competition
Club	Season	League			Cup		Continental		Other		Total	
Club	Season	Division	Apps	Goals	Apps	Goals	Apps	Goals	Apps	Goals	Apps	Goals
Inđija	2009–10	Serbian First League	1	0	0	0	—		—		1	0
Inđija	2010–11	Serbian SuperLiga	4	0	0	0	—		—		4	0
Inđija	2011–12	Serbian First League	21	3	2	1	—		—		23	4
Inđija	2012–13	Serbian First League	21	3	1	0	—		—		22	3
Inđija	2013–14	Serbian First League	27	9	0	0	—		—		27	9
Inđija	2014–15	Serbian First League	9	5	1	0	—		—		10	5
Inđija	2015–16 (loan)	Serbian First League	8	4	—		—		—		8	4
Inđija	2016–17	Serbian First League	24	8	0	0	—		—		24	8
Inđija	Total		115	32	4	1	—		—		119	33
Napredak Kruševac	2014–15	Serbian SuperLiga	13	2	—		—		2 (Note: Appearances in league play-offs)	0	15	2
Napredak Kruševac	2015–16	Serbian First League	11	1	2	2	—		—		13	3
Napredak Kruševac	2016–17	Serbian SuperLiga	2	0	—		—		—		2	0
Napredak Kruševac	Total		26	3	2	2	—		2	0	30	5
Riga	2017	Latvian Higher League	8	3	3	3	—		—		11	6
Riga	2018	Latvian Higher League	24	15	4	1	2	0	—		30	16
Riga	2019	Latvian Higher League	10	5	0	0	0	0	—		10	5
Riga	Total		42	23	7	4	2	0	—		51	27
RFS	2019	Latvian Higher League	13	10	4	5	2	1	—		19	16
RFS	2020	Latvian Higher League	12	4	—		1	0	—		13	4
RFS	2021	Latvian Higher League	9	5	—		6	5	—		15	10
Career total			217	77	17	12	11	6	2	0	247	95

== Honours ==
Inđija

- Serbian First League: 2009–10

Napredak Kruševac

- Serbian First League: 2015–16

Riga

- Latvian Higher League: 2018
- Latvian Football Cup: 2018

Gent

- Belgian Cup: 2021–22

RFS

- Latvian Higher League: 2026

Individual

- Latvian Higher League Top scorer: 2018, 2019, 2025
