= Valmiera FC in European football =

Latvian club in European football

- Club: Valmiera FC
- Seasons played: 5
- First entry: 2020-21 UEFA Europa League
- Latest entry: 2023–24 UEFA Europa League

These are the matches Valmiera FC have played in European football competitions. Having been promoted in 2018, the club's first entry into European competitions was in the 2020–21 UEFA Europa League, qualifying for the first qualifying round after a fourth-place finish in the 2019 league campaign.

== Matches ==
List of Valmiera FC matches in European football
Season	Tournament	Round	Opponent	Home	Away	Aggregate	Ref.
2020–21	Europa League	Q1	(Poland) Lech Poznań	—	0–3	—	
2021–22	Conference League	Q1	(Lithuania) Sūduva	0–0	1–2	1–2	
2022–23	Conference League	Q2	(North Macedonia) Shkëndija	1–2	1–3	2–5	
2023–24	Champions League	Q1	(Slovenia) Olimpija Ljubljana	1–2	1–2	2–4	
2023–24	Conference League	Q2	(San Marino) Tre Penne	7–0	3–0	10–0	
2023–24	Conference League	Q3	(Albania) Partizani	1–2	0–1	1–3	

=== By Competition ===
The following is a list of the all-time statistics from Valmiera's games in the 3 UEFA tournaments it has participated in, as well as the overall total. The list contains the tournament, the number of matches played (Pld), won (W), drawn (D) and lost (L). The number of goals for (GF), goals against (GA), goal difference (GD) and the percentage of matches won (Win%). The statistics include qualification matches and is up to date as of the 2023–24 season. The statistics also include goals scored during extra time where applicable; in these games, the result given is the result at the end of extra time.

As of match played 21 June 2024

Tournament	Pld	W	D	L	GF	GA	GD	Win%
UEFA Champions League	2	0	0	2	2	4	−2	0.00
UEFA Europa League	1	0	0	1	0	3	−3	0.00
UEFA Conference League	8	2	1	5	14	10	+4	25.00

=== By Club ===
The following list details Valmiera FC's all-time record against clubs they have met one or more times in European competition. The club and its country are given, as well as the number of games played (Pld), won by Valmiera (W), drawn (D) and lost by Valmiera (L), goals for RFS (GF), goals against RFS (GA), Valmiera's goal difference (GD), and their win percentages. Statistics are correct as of the 2024–25 season and include goals scored during extra time where applicable; in these games, the result given is the result at the end of extra time.

Accurate as of 1 October 2024.

Positive balance (more wins than losses)
Neutral balance (as many wins as losses)
Negative balance (more losses than wins)

Club	Played	Won	Drew	Lost	GF	GA	GD	Win%
(Poland) Lech Poznań	1	0	0	1	0	3	−3	0.00
(Slovenia) Olimpija	2	0	0	2	2	4	−2	0.00
(Albania) Partizani	2	0	0	2	1	3	−2	0.00
(North Macedonia) Shkëndija	2	0	0	2	2	5	−3	0.00
(Lithuania) Sūduva	2	0	1	1	1	2	−1	0.00
(San Marino) Tre Penne	2	2	0	0	10	0	+10	100.00
