= Aboubakar Karamoko =

Ivorian footballer

Personal information
- Full name: Aboubakar Karamoko
- Date of birth: 15 October 1999 (age 27)
- Height: 1.77 m (5 ft 10 in)
- Position: Winger

Team information
- Current team: FC San Pédro
- Number: 33

Youth career
- –2018: Aspire Academy
- 2018–2020: Málaga

Senior career*
Years	Team	Apps	(Gls)
2018–2020	Atlético Malagueño	25	(0)
2020–2021	Doxa	4	(0)
2021	→ Digenis Morphou (loan)		
2021–2022	Ermis Aradippou	18	(2)
2022–2023	Auda	14	(0)
2023	→ Riga (loan)	16	(0)
2023–2024	United FC	6	(2)
2024–	FC San Pédro		
- * Club domestic league appearances and goals as of 3 November 2023

Aboubakar Karamoko (born 15 October 1999) is an Ivorian professional footballer who plays as a winger for FC San Pédro.

== Club career ==
In April 2015 whilst playing for the Aspire Academy, Karamoko was named in the team of the tournament whilst competing in a competition in Catalonia. Two years later whilst playing in the same tournament, he was spotted by Málaga and later signed to the club's academy. He spent the next two seasons featuring for the club's B team, Atlético Malagueño, making 25 appearances. In August 2020, he joined Cypriot First Division side Doxa. On 2 October 2020, Karamoko made his professional debut as a substitute in a 3–3 draw with Karmiotissa. On 5 January 2021, he joined Cypriot Second Division side Digenis Morphou on loan until the end of the season.

In March 2023, he joined league rivals Riga on loan for the 2023 season having featured for Auda the previous season.

In August 2024, Karamoko moved to Ivorian side FC San Pédro.
