= Kirill Alshevsky =

Belarusian football coach

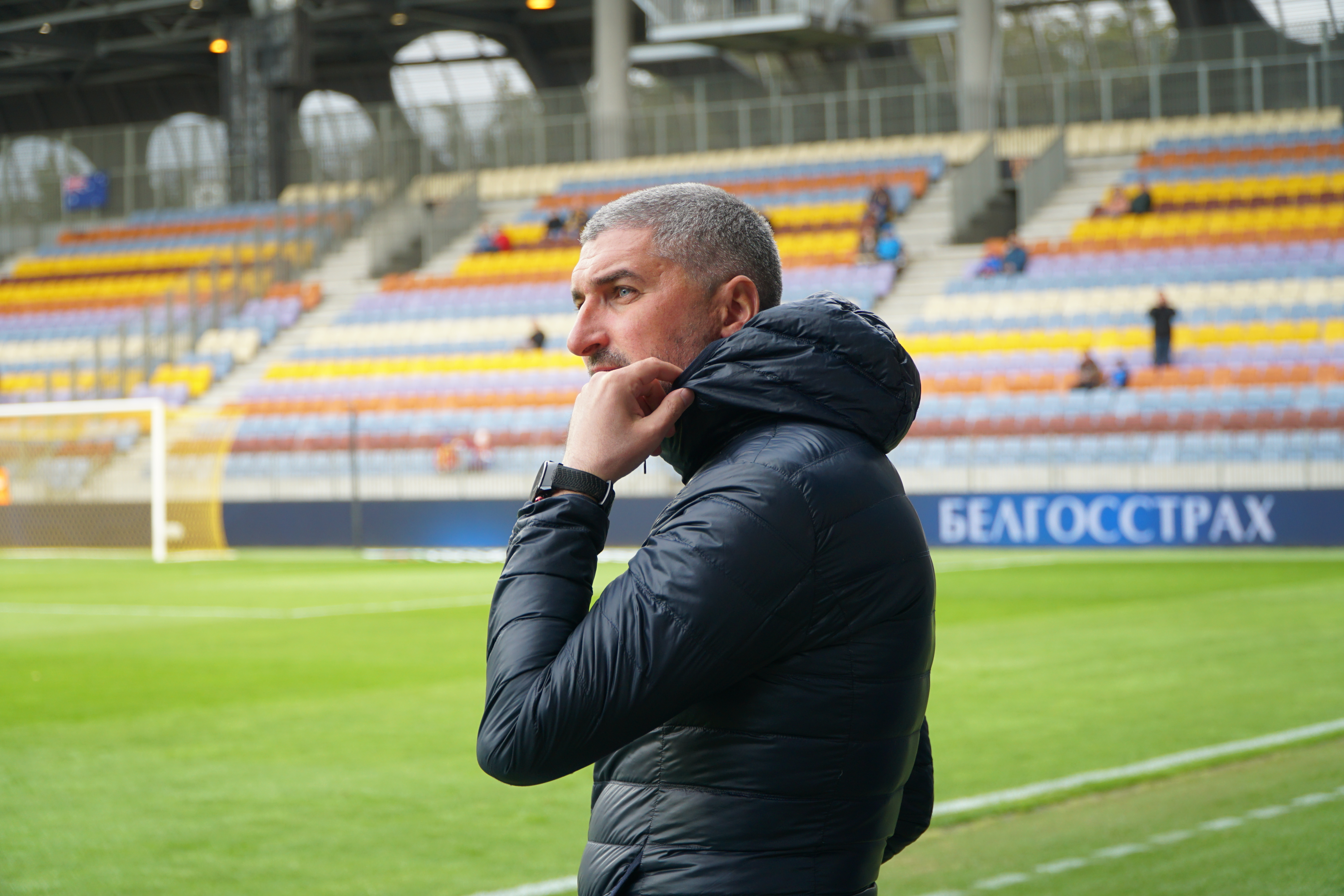
- Alshevsky in 2020

Personal information
- Date of birth: 27 January 1982 (age 44)
- Place of birth: Borisov, Minsk Oblast, Byelorussian SSR, Soviet Union
- Position: Defender

Team information
- Current team: Unixlabs Minsk (manager)

Youth career
- 1999–2000: RUOR Minsk

Senior career*
Years	Team	Apps	(Gls)
2000–2001	RUOR Minsk	37	(0)

Managerial career
- 2002–2006: RUOR Minsk (assistant)
- 2006–2007: BATE Borisov (youth)
- 2007–2008: BATE Borisov (reserves assistant)
- 2009: Dinamo Minsk (reserves)
- 2009: Dinamo Minsk
- 2010–2012: Belarus U21 (assistant)
- 2012–2014: BATE Borisov (sporting director)
- 2014–2018: Belarus U19 (assistant)
- 2019: BATE Borisov (reserves)
- 2020: BATE Borisov
- 2021: Rukh Brest
- 2022: Liepāja
- 2022–2023: BATE Borisov
- 2024–2025: Veles Moscow
- 2026: Irtysh Pavlodar
- 2026–: Unixlabs Minsk
- * Club domestic league appearances and goals

Kirill Alshevsky (Belarusian: Кірыл Альшэўскі, Russian: Кирилл Альшевский; born 27 January 1982) is a Belarusian professional football manager.

== Career ==
He started his managerial career at the age of 21 and since worked as youth, reserves or assistant manager at RUOR Minsk, BATE Borisov and Dinamo Minsk as well as Belarus national youth teams.

In 2009, he became the youngest manager in the history of Dinamo Minsk and Belarusian Premier League.

== Honours ==
=== Manager ===
BATE Borisov

- Belarusian Cup: 2019–20
