= 2019 Latvian Football Cup =

Football competition held in Latvia

Tournament details
- Country: Latvia
- Teams: 45

Final positions
- Champions: RFS
- Runners-up: Jelgava

Tournament statistics
- Matches played: 44
- Goals scored: 191 (4.34 per match)

The 2019 Latvian Football Cup was the 25th edition of the football tournament. The competition began on 22 May 2019 and ended on 26 October 2019. Riga FC were the defending champions, having won the previous year's final over Ventspils 5–4 in a penalty shoot–out.

== Format ==
Forty–five clubs participated in this season's Latvian Football Cup. Each round was played over one leg with matches which were level at the end of regulation proceeding to extra time and afterwards to penalties, when needed, to determine the winning club.

== First round ==
Eight first round matches were played 22–31 May 2019.

| Team 1 | Score | Team 2 |
|---|---|---|
| Salaspils | 4–1 | FK Jurnieks |
| Jauniba/Upesciems | 2–1 | Jūrmalas SS |
| Riga United | 1–3 | FK Karosta |
| Cargo/DFA | 7–0 | FK Monarhs |
| Talsu NSS/Laidze | 0–1 | FK Aliance |
| AFA Olaine | 1–2 | FK Kalupe |
| DVSK Traktors | 1–3 | SK Krimulda |
| Caramba | 8–2 | FK Limbazi |

== Second round ==
Fourteen second round matches were played 12–21 June 2019.

| Team 1 | Score | Team 2 |
|---|---|---|
| Caramba | 5–3 | Mārupe SC |
| JDFS Alberts | 3–1 (a.e.t.) | Dinamo Rīga/Staicele |
| FK Auda | 1–5 | FK Tukums 2000/TSS |
| FK Kalupe | 0–0 (a.e.t.) (3–5 p) | FC New Project |
| Salaspils | 3–0 | Jaunība/Upesciems |
| Albatroz SC | 1–2 | Grobiņas SC |
| FK Karosta | 8–1 | Madona FK |
| FK Līvāni | 5–1 | FC Nikers |
| SK Super Nova | 3–3 (a.e.t.) (2–0 p) | Rēzeknes FA/BJSS |
| FK Alberts | 2–1 | FK Lielupe |
| SK Krimulda | 3–2 | Keiko |
| FK Aliance | 1–2 | LDZ Cargo/DFA |
| FK Smiltene/BJSS | 3–0 | Ghetto FC |
| Lubāna/Degumnieki | 2–6 | Tente |

1. Smiltene were awarded a 3–0 win when Ghetto FC refused to participate.

== Third round ==
Seven third round matches were played 21–30 June 2019.

| Team 1 | Score | Team 2 |
|---|---|---|
| Caramba | 1–0 | Salaspils |
| FK Tukums 2000/TSS | 9–1 | SK Krimulda |
| Grobiņas SC | 2–4 | JDFS Alberts |
| FK Līvāni | 0–7 | FK Smiltene/BJSS |
| Tente | 0–1 | FK Karosta |
| FC New Project | 1–2 | SK Super Nova |
| LDZ Cargo/DFA | 6–0 | FK Alberts |

== Fourth round ==
Eight fourth round matches were played 13–17 July 2019.

| Team 1 | Score | Team 2 |
|---|---|---|
| JDFS Alberts | 0–1 | Caramba |
| FK Tukums 2000/TSS | 4–1 | Ventspils |
| FK Smiltene/BJSS | 0–4 | Liepāja |
| Valmiera Glass ViA | 1–2 | RFS |
| SK Super Nova | 0–6 | Riga |
| Spartaks Jūrmala | 0–1 | Daugavpils |
| Jelgava | 1–0 | METTA/LU |
| FK Karosta | 4–1 | LDZ Cargo/DFA |

== Quarter–finals ==
Four quarter–final matches were played from 4 August to 1 September 2019.

| Team 1 | Score | Team 2 |
|---|---|---|
| Caramba | 1–1 (a.e.t.) (3–4 p) | FK Karosta |
| Liepāja | 1–2 | RFS |
| Daugavpils | 1–2 | Jelgava |
| Riga | 4–0 | FK Tukums 2000/TSS |

== Semi–finals ==
Two semi-final matches were played 25–26 September 2019.

| Team 1 | Score | Team 2 |
|---|---|---|
| FK Karosta | 0–5 | Jelgava |
| RFS | 3–1 | Riga |

== Final ==
The final was played on 26 October 2019.

26 October 2019
13:20

| RFS | 3–2 (a.e.t.) | Jelgava |

Referee: Aleksandrs Golubevs

| FK RFS | FK Jelgava |

== See also ==
2019 Latvian Higher League
