= Kristaps Blanks =

Latvian footballer

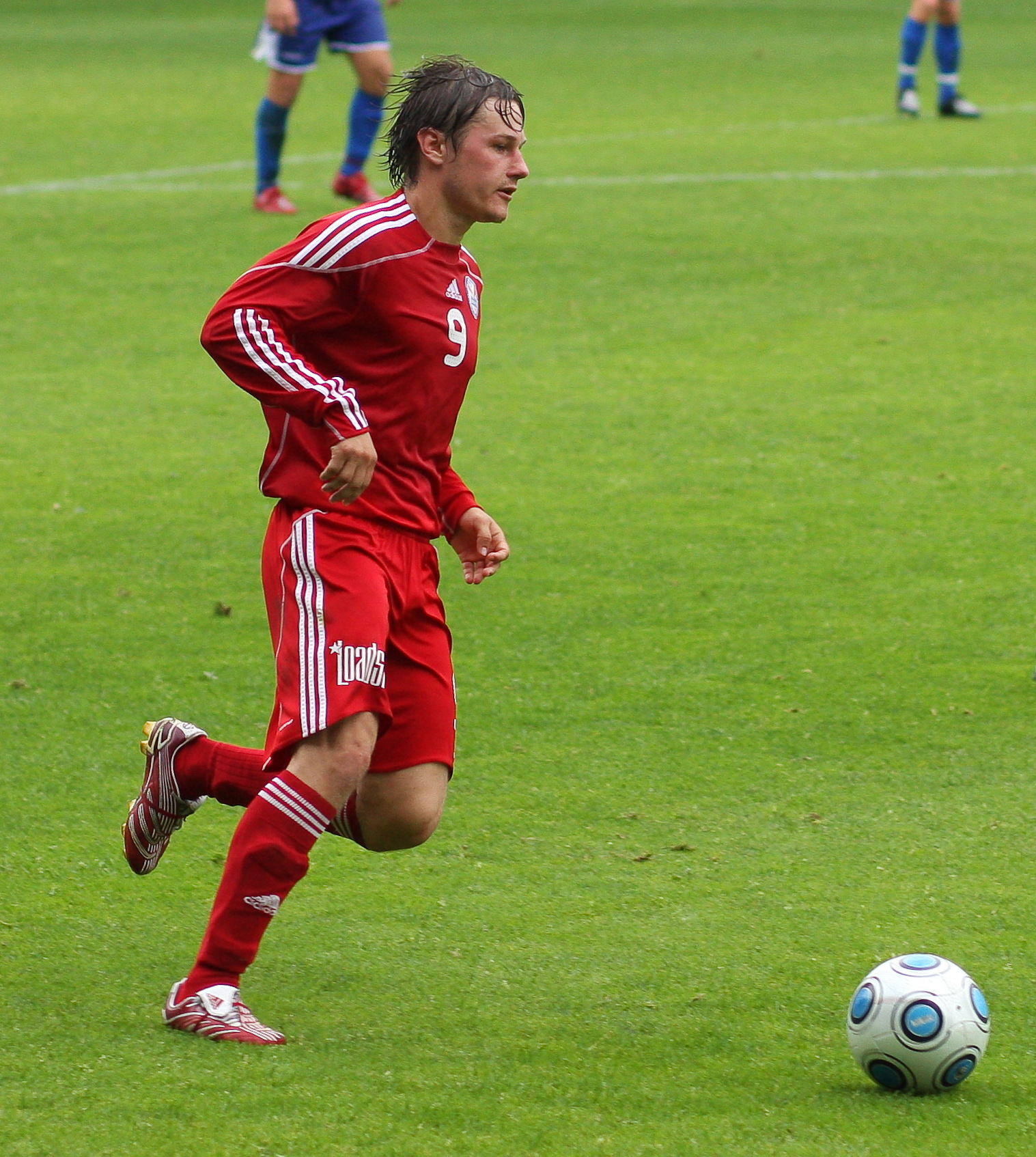
- Kristaps Blanks playing for Skonto

Personal information
- Full name: Kristaps Blanks
- Date of birth: 30 January 1986 (age 40)
- Place of birth: Tukums, Latvian SSR, Soviet Union
- Height: 1.71 m (5 ft 7 in)
- Position: Striker

Team information
- Current team: Riga FC (first-team coach)

Youth career
- Tukums 2000

Senior career*
Years	Team	Apps	(Gls)
2002	Multibanka Riga	14	(5)
2003–2013	Skonto Rīga	190	(40)
2014	Daugava Rīga	23	(1)
2015	Tukums 2000	11	(11)
2015	Caramba/Dinamo	17	(8)

International career^{‡}
2003–2010	Latvia	21	(0)

Managerial career
- 2017–: Riga FC (assistant coach)
- 2022–: Riga FC (interim)
- * Club domestic league appearances and goals as of 2016 ‡ National team caps and goals as of 2016

Kristaps Blanks (born 30 January 1986) is a Latvian football coach and former player who played as striker. He is a first-team coach at Riga FC.
