= Preiļu BJSS =

Latvian football club

- Ground: Preiļu stadions, Preiļi, Latvia
- Capacity: 1500
- Chairman: Romāns Petrovs
- Manager: Imants Babris
- League: Latvian First League
- 2018: 12th
- Website: http://www.preili.lv/futbols
Home colours	Away colours

Preiļi BJSS is a Latvian football club, playing in the second-highest division of Latvian football (1. līga). They are from Preiļi.

== History ==
In 2008, Preiļi BJSS promoted from the 2. līga to the 1. līga. The team had a very successful season, winning almost all their games.

Their first season in the Latvian League one was largely unsuccessful. Preiļi had a few good games. The most surprising was the game against Latvian Cup winners FK Jelgava when the game ended 3–3. Preiļi ended the 2009 season just 2 points ahead of the relegation zone. The 2010 season in the 2.līga wasn't successful. The team had problems with their roster and Preiļi ended the season last, in 5th place.

== Honours ==
- Latvijas 2.līga runners-up
  - 2008

== League and Cup history ==
Preiļi

Season	Division (Name)	Pos./Teams	Latvian Football Cup
2004	3rd (2.līga Latgale)	7/(7)	
2005	3rd (2.līga Latgale)	6/(7)	
2006	3rd (2.līga Latgale)	5/(7)	
2007	3rd (2.līga Latgale)	3/(6)	
2008	3rd (2.līga Latgale)	1/(4)	2nd round
2009	2nd (1.līga)	14/(14)	
2010	3rd (2.līga Latgale)	5/(5)	2nd round

== Players ==
=== First-team squad ===
As of 9 April 2016.

Note: Flags indicate national team as defined under FIFA eligibility rules; some limited exceptions apply. Players may hold more than one non-FIFA nationality.

No.	Pos.	Nation	Player
2	DF	LVA	Valters Reinis
3	DF	LVA	Atis Litavnieks
4	DF	LVA	Andrejs Birjukovs
5	DF	LVA	Vladislavs Breidaks
6	MF	LVA	Guntis Sparāns
7	FW	LVA	Aigars Caics
8	MF	LVA	Aleksandrs Jubels
9	MF	LVA	Rinalds Zeps
10	MF	LVA	Rolands Putāns
11	MF	LVA	Matīss Babris
12	MF	LVA	Aleksandrs Trūps

No.	Pos.	Nation	Player
13	FW	LVA	Konstantīns Stabulnieks
14	DF	LVA	Jānis Pastars
15	DF	LVA	Arturs Stabulnieks
16	DF	LVA	Nauris Vigulis
17	MF	LVA	Iļja Mitrofanovs
18	FW	LVA	Renārs Pastars
19	MF	LVA	Viktors Krotovs
20	FW	LVA	Māris Stroganovs
21	DF	LVA	Andris Trūps
25	GK	LVA	Rūdis Skutelis
95	GK	LVA	Aleksandrs Birjukovs
