= FK Liepāja =

Latvian football club

Liepāja
- Full name: Futbola klubs Liepāja
- Founded: 2014; 12 years ago
- Ground: Daugava Stadium
- Capacity: 5,100
- Chairman: Oļegs Hramovs
- Manager: Jānis Goba (caretaker)
- League: Virslīga
- 2026: Virslīga, 5th of 10
- Website: www.fkliepaja.lv
Home colours	Away colours	Third colours

FK Liepāja is a Latvian professional football club established in 2014. The club is based at the Daugava Stadium in Liepāja. FK Liepāja plays in the Latvian Higher League. In their first season, they finished 4th in the 2014 Latvian Higher League.

== History ==
FK Liepāja/Mogo was founded in March 2014 as a phoenix club and an indirect legatee of FK Liepājas Metalurgs, which was dissolved following the 2013 Latvian Higher League season due to the bankruptcy of its owner company and the sole sponsor metallurgical plant A/S Liepājas Metalurgs. FK Liepāja incorporated all the players, including youth teams, as well as the participation place in the 2014 Latvian Higher League, which had been at the disposal of Liepājas Metalurgs prior to its bankruptcy. The club is mainly sponsored by the Liepāja City Council and led by the former Latvian international footballer Māris Verpakovskis. The first manager of the team was Viktors Dobrecovs.

In its debut season FK Liepāja finished the championship in the top four. Jānis Ikaunieks, FK Liepāja midfielder, was voted as the best player of the 2014 season.

On 15 November 2016, Tamaz Pertia was appointed as the new manager of FK Liepāja.

On 14 September 2018, Gordon Young was appointed as the new manager of FK Liepāja.

=== League ===
Season	Division	Pos.	Pl.	W	D	L	GS	GA	P	Latvian Football Cup	Top Scorer (League)	Manager
2014	1st	4th	36	21	3	12	72	45	66	Semifinal	(Latvia) Jānis Ikaunieks – 23	(Latvia) Viktors Dobrecovs
2015	1st	1st	24	15	7	2	48	23	52	Quarterfinal	(Latvia) Dāvis Ikaunieks – 15	(Latvia) Viktors Dobrecovs
2016	1st	4th	28	12	6	10	38	31	42	Quarterfinal	(Latvia) Oskars Kļava – 6	(Latvia) Viktors Dobrecovs
2017	1st	2nd	24	11	4	9	32	25	37	Winners	(Latvia) Artūrs Karašausks – 12	(Georgia (country)) Tamaz Pertia
2018	1st	4th	28	15	6	7	46	25	51	Quarterfinal	(Latvia) Ģirts Karlsons – 10	(Georgia (country)) Tamaz Pertia (Argentina) Dario Aurelio (Scotland) Gordon Young
2019	1st	6th	32	11	6	15	41	43	39	Quarterfinal	(Latvia) Jānis Ikaunieks – 7	(Scotland) Gordon Young (Latvia) Aleksandrs Starkovs
2020	1st	5th	27	12	6	9	57	34	42	Winners	(Brazil) Dodô – 18	(Latvia) Aleksandrs Starkovs (Belarus) Dmitry Molosh
2021	1st	3rd	28	16	3	9	47	26	51	Runners Up	(Brazil) Dodô – 7	(Serbia) Nebojša Vignjević
2022	1st	4th	36	21	7	8	72	42	70	Round of 16	(Brazil) Dodô – 13	(Belarus) Kirill Alshevsky (Georgia (country)) Tamaz Pertia
2023	1st	5th	36	14	9	13	52	54	51	Semifinal	(Brazil) Dodô – 13	(Georgia (country)) Tamaz Pertia
2024	1st	6th	36	10	9	17	37	56	39	Semifinal	(Brazil) Dodô – 9	(Georgia (country)) Tamaz Pertia

=== Europe ===
1R: First round, 2Q: Second qualifying round, 3Q: Third qualifying round, PO: Play-off round

Season	Competition	Round	Opponent	Home	Away	Aggregate
2016–17	UEFA Champions League	2Q	(Austria) Red Bull Salzburg	0–2	0–1	0–3
2017–18	UEFA Europa League	1Q	(Northern Ireland) Crusaders	2–0	1–3	3–3 (a)
2017–18	UEFA Europa League	2Q	(Lithuania) Sūduva Marijampolė	0–2	1–0	1–2
2018–19	UEFA Europa League	1Q	(Sweden) BK Häcken	0–3	2–1	2–4
2019–20	UEFA Europa League	1Q	(Belarus) Dinamo Minsk	1–1	2–1	3–2
2019–20	UEFA Europa League	2Q	(Sweden) IFK Norrköping	0–1	0–2	0–3
2021–22	UEFA Europa Conference League	1Q	(North Macedonia) Struga	1–1	4–1	5–2
2021–22	UEFA Europa Conference League	2Q	(Bulgaria) CSKA Sofia	0–0 (a.e.t.)	0–0	0–0 (1–3 p)
2022–23	UEFA Europa Conference League	1Q	(Kosovo) Gjilani	3–1	0–1	3−2
2022–23	UEFA Europa Conference League	2Q	(Switzerland) Young Boys	0–1	0–3	0–4
2024–25	UEFA Conference League	1Q	(Faroe Islands) Víkingur	1–1	0–2	1−3
2026–27	UEFA Conference League	1Q	(Montenegro) Dečić	1–0	2–1	3–1
2026–27	UEFA Conference League	2Q	Austria Wien	0–2	1–3	1–5

== Honours ==
- Virslīga
  - Champions (1): 2015
- Latvian Football Cup
  - Winners (2): 2017, 2020

== Sponsors ==
Sponsors

(Latvia) Mogo
(Latvia) Liepājas Dome
(Latvia) Firma UPTK
(Latvia) Ambero
(Latvia) Liepājas Olimpiskais Centrs
(Latvia) Radio SWH
(Latvia) Radio SWH+
(Latvia) NPK Expert
(Latvia) Liepājas Enerģija
(Latvia) Liepājas Papīrs

Kit manufacturer

(Germany) Adidas

== Players ==
=== Current squad ===
As of 4 September 2026

Note: Flags indicate national team as defined under FIFA eligibility rules; some limited exceptions apply. Players may hold more than one non-FIFA nationality.

No.	Pos.	Nation	Player
1	GK	LAT	Alvis Sorokins (on loan from Metta)
2	DF	NED	Bart Straalman
3	DF	LAT	Kirils Iļjins
4	DF	LUX	Marvin Martins
6	MF	CIV	Rodolphe Ekou
7	MF	NGR	Abiodun Ogunniyi
9	FW	BRA	Crysthyan Lucas (on loan from Londrina)
11	MF	KGZ	Beknaz Almazbekov
12	GK	MNE	Danijel Petković
15	DF	CIV	Cisse Mory
17	FW	LAT	Bruno Melnis
18	FW	BEN	Ede Oloko
22	MF	KEN	Irad Mshindi
23	MF	MTN	Amar Haïdara

No.	Pos.	Nation	Player
24	GK	LAT	Dāvis Ošs
26	DF	LAT	Vjačeslavs Isajevs
28	MF	UKR	Andriy Korobenko
32	MF	ARG	Leonel Strumia
33	DF	LAT	Iļja Korotkovs
34	DF	BRA	Talisca
35	DF	LAT	Vladislavs Sorokins
40	MF	LAT	Roberts Untulis
44	FW	NED	Kyvon Leidsman
70	MF	LAT	Danila Patijčuks
77	FW	POR	Afonso Leite
—	DF	ANG	Bastão
—	DF	NGR	Favour Ogono
—	DF	BRA	João Gabriel

=== Out on loan ===
Note: Flags indicate national team as defined under FIFA eligibility rules; some limited exceptions apply. Players may hold more than one non-FIFA nationality.

No.	Pos.	Nation	Player
—	MF	GUI	Amadou Traoré (at TransINVEST)
—	FW	LAT	Ņikita Parfjonovs (at Ogre)

== Staff ==
Position	Name
President	(Lithuania) Oļegs Hramovs
Director	(Latvia) Dāvids Jansons
Manager	(Sweden) Andreas Alm
Assistant manager	(Brazil) Michel Huff Dos Santos
Assistant manager	(Latvia) Jānis Goba
Goalkeeping coach	(Latvia) Andrejs Piedels
Video analyst	(Ukraine) Oleksandr Panchuk
Doctor	(Ukraine) Andrii Kolosov
Masseur	(Belarus) Viktar Bulat
Press secretary	(Latvia) Mihails Koroļovs

== Managers ==
As of match played 10 March 2019

Name	Nat.	From	To	P	W	D	L	GS	GA	%W	Honours	Notes
Viktors Dobrecovs	Latvia	1 March 2014	5 November 2016	96	52	16	28	175	108	54.17	Latvian Higher League	
Tamaz Pertia	Georgia	15 November 2016	30 July 2018	50	27	8	15	85	57	54.00	Latvian Cup	
Mareks Zuntners	Latvia	30 July 2018	14 September 2018	6	1	1	4	4	6	16.67		
Gordon Young	Scotland	14 September 2018	23 April 2019	10	6	1	3	9	4	60.00		
Aleksandrs Starkovs	Latvia	April 2019	September 2019									
Andrejs Kaļiņins	Latvia	January 2020	June 2020									
Dmitry Molosh	Belarus	June 2020	June 2021									
Nebojša Vignjević	Serbia	July 2021	31 January 2022								3rd place Latvian Higher League	
Kirill Alshevsky	Belarus	February 2022	June 2022									
Tamaz Pertia	Georgia	2022	2024									
Dino Skender	Croatia	7 January 2025	6 April 2025	5	2	1	2	11	10	40.00		
Jānis Goba	Latvia	6 April 2025	8 May 2025	6	2	2	2	11	13	33.33		
Andreas Alm	Sweden	8 May 2025										
