= Riga FC =

Latvian football club

Riga
- Full name: Riga Football Club; Riga FC, SIA
- Founded: 30 April 2014; 12 years ago
- Ground: Skonto Stadium
- Capacity: 8,087
- Chairman: Aleksandrs Proņins
- Manager: Adrián Guľa
- League: Virslīga
- 2025: Virslīga, 1st of 10 (Champions)
- Website: rigafc.lv
Home colours	Away colours	Third colours

Riga Football Club, commonly referred to as Riga FC, is a Latvian football club, founded in 2014. The club is based at the Skonto Stadium in Riga. Since 2016, the club has been playing in the Virslīga, the highest tier of the Latvian football league system.

== History ==
The club was officially registered in April 2014. The team was established before the 2015 season after a merger of two Riga based teams – FC Caramba and Dinamo Rīga.

In the 2015 season, under the name FC Caramba/Dinamo, the team played in the Latvian First League by using the licence received by FC Caramba, an unrelated team founded by future FK RFS co-founder Maksims Krivuņecs, which had won promotion to the 1. līga after winning the Latvian Second League in 2014. After winning the 2015 First League and earning promotion to the Higher League, the club changed its name to Riga FC. However, for most of 2015, the legal name of the team was 'Riga Dinamo Football Club'. A club named Dinamo Riga played in 1940 and 1945–1960 during the Soviet occupation of Latvia.

In 2017, Riga FC acquired the Šitiks Football Academy (Šitika FA), founded in 1999 by Genādijs Šitiks, and operates it as one of its youth academies, Riga FC Academy.

In 2018, the Ukrainian Viktor Skrypnyk was appointed as coach. He managed to lead the club to two Latvian Higher Leagues in 2018, 2019 and the Latvian Football Cup in 2018.

On November 7, 2026, Riga FC announced a boycott, stating that they would not play against FK RFS on November 8, 2026, due to having lost any hope of winning the title and because of a rules violation. The football club has been handed a technical defeat and received a fine.

=== Women's, indoor and beach sections ===
Riga FC's women's football section – Riga FC Women – was founded in 2024, winning the Latvian Women's League title two years in a row. Riga FC also has an indoor football (futsal) section – Riga Futsal Club, which plays in the Latvian Futsal Premier League. The futsal section was established in March 2023, after Riga FC had acquired top-division side FC Petrow, which was in turn founded in 2012.

A beach soccer section, Riga FC (Riga BFC, Riga Beach Soccer Club) is playing in the Latvian league and international tournaments. Riga FC won silver medals in the 2023 BSWW World Winners Cup, held in Italy.

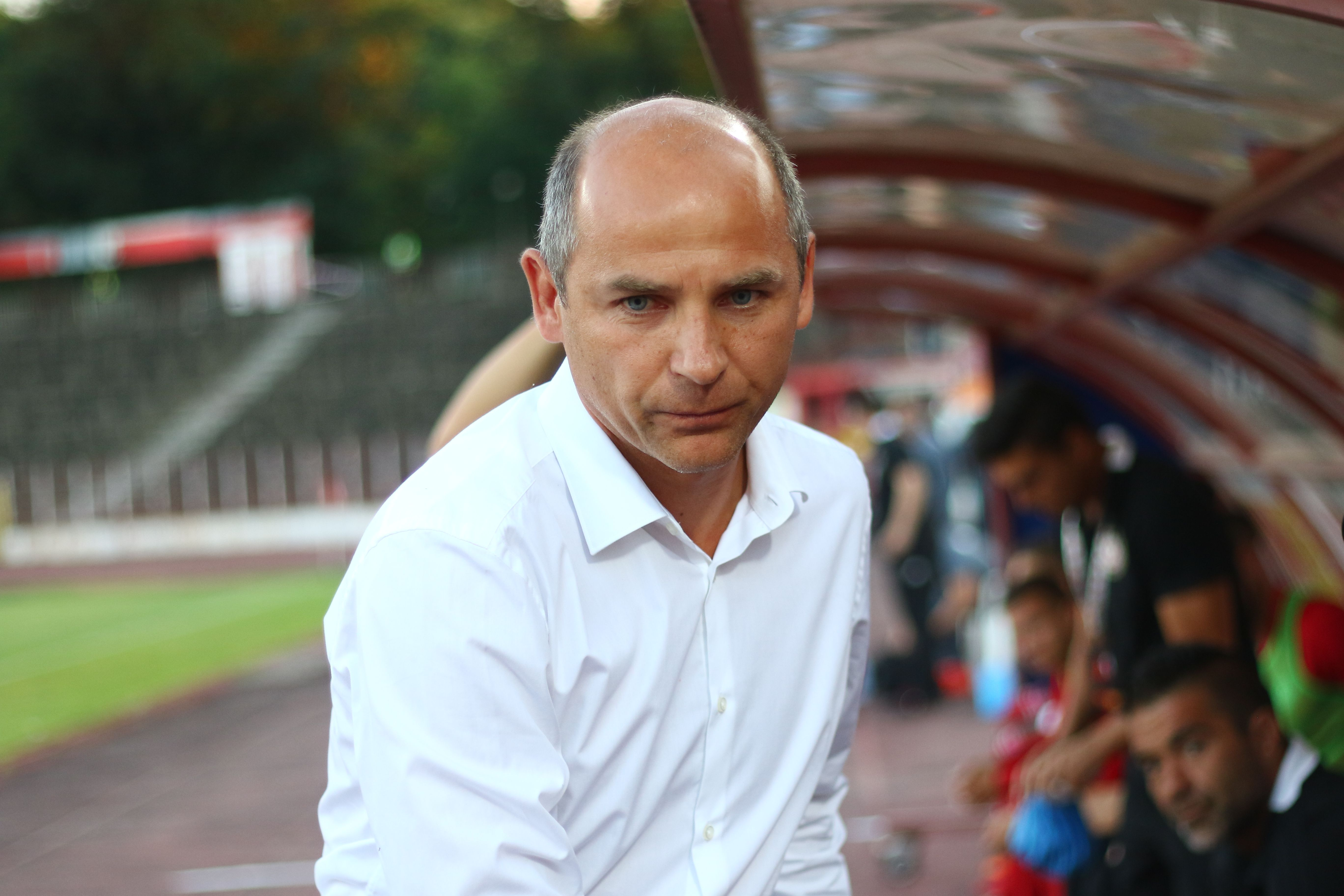
Ukrainian manager Viktor Skrypnyk has won the first ever Virslīga title in the club's history.

=== Domestic ===
Season	Division (Name)	Pos./Teams	Pl.	W	D	L	GS	GA	P	Latvian Football Cup	Top Scorer (League)	Manager
2015	2nd	1/(16)	30	27	3	0	142	14	84	Round of 16	(Latvia) Verners Apiņš – 31	(Latvia) Mihails Koņevs
2016	1st	5/(8)	28	8	12	8	28	24	36	Runner-up	(Latvia) Roberts Savaļnieks (Japan) Yōsuke Saitō – 5	(Russia) Kiril Kurbatov (Turkmenistan) Dmitri Khomukha (Russia) Vladimir Volchek
2017	1st	3/(7)	24	10	7	7	28	20	37	Runner-up	(Estonia) Bogdan Vaštšuk – 8	(Russia) Vladimir Volchek (Latvia) Mihails Koņevs (Russia) Yevgeny Perevertaylo (Slovenia) Slaviša Stojanović
2018	1st	1/(8)	28	20	4	4	45	16	64	Winner	(Serbia) Darko Lemajić – 15	(North Macedonia) Goce Sedloski (Latvia) Mihails Koņevs (Ukraine) Viktor Skrypnyk
2019	1st	1/(9)	32	20	6	6	59	21	66	Semi-Finals	(Ukraine) Roman Debelko – 7	(Portugal) Luís Berkemeier Pimenta (Belarus) Oleg Kubarev (Latvia) Mihails Koņevs
2020	1st	1/(10)	27	23	0	4	60	21	69	Quarter-finals	(Democratic Republic of the Congo) Kule Mbombo – 12	(Russia) Oleg Kononov (Latvia) Mihails Koņevs
2021	1st	4/(9)	28	14	8	6	54	26	50	Semi-Finals	(Montenegro) Stefan Milošević – 13	(Russia) (South Korea) Denis Laktionov (Latvia) Kristaps Blanks (Latvia) Andris Rihters (North Macedonia) Sashko Poposki
2022	1st	2/(10)	36	26	3	7	68	23	81	Round of 16	(Argentina) Marcelo Torres – 11	(Germany) Thorsten Fink (Latvia) Kristaps Blanks (Croatia) Sandro Perković
2023	1st	2/(10)	36	27	7	2	89	21	88	Winner	(Latvia) Marko Regža – 19	(Croatia) Tomislav Stipić
2024	1st	2/(10)	36	27	6	3	99	23	87	Semi-Finals	(Brazil) Reginaldo Ramires – 25	(Finland) Simo Valakari (Latvia) Mareks Zuntners

=== European ===
Fully up to date as of 13 August 2026

Competition	Pld	W	D	L	GF	GA	GD
UEFA Champions League	7	1	3	3	4	8	–4
UEFA Europa League	10	4	2	4	11	12	–1
UEFA Europa Conference League	30	16	4	10	48	38	+10
Total	47	21	9	17	63	58	+5

Season	Competition	Round	Club	Home	Away	Agg.
2018–19	UEFA Europa League	1QR	(Bulgaria) CSKA Sofia	1−0	0−1	1−1 (5−3 p)
2019–20	UEFA Champions League	1QR	(Republic of Ireland) Dundalk	0−0	0−0	0−0 (5−4 p)
2019–20	UEFA Europa League	2QR	(Poland) Piast Gliwice	2−1	2−3	4−4 (a)
2019–20	UEFA Europa League	3QR	(Finland) HJK	1−1	2−2	3−3 (a)
2019–20	UEFA Europa League	PO	(Denmark) Copenhagen	1−0	1−3	2−3
2020–21	UEFA Champions League	1QR	(Israel) Maccabi Tel Aviv	—N/a	0−2	—N/a
2020–21	UEFA Europa League	2QR	(San Marino) Tre Fiori	1−0	—N/a	—N/a
2020–21	UEFA Europa League	3QR	(Scotland) Celtic	0−1	—N/a	—N/a
2021–22	UEFA Champions League	1QR	(Sweden) Malmö	1−1	0−1	1−2
2021–22	UEFA Europa Conference League	2QR	(North Macedonia) Shkëndija	2−0	1−0	3−0
2021–22	UEFA Europa Conference League	3QR	(Malta) Hibernians	0−1	4−1 (a.e.t.)	4−2
2021–22	UEFA Europa Conference League	PO	(Gibraltar) Lincoln Red Imps	1−1	1−3 (a.e.t.)	2−4
2022–23	UEFA Europa Conference League	1QR	(Republic of Ireland) Derry City	2−0	2−0	4−0
2022–23	UEFA Europa Conference League	2QR	(Slovakia) Ružomberok	2−1	3−0	5−1
2022–23	UEFA Europa Conference League	3QR	(Portugal) Gil Vicente	1−1	0−4	1−5
2023–24	UEFA Europa Conference League	1QR	(Iceland) Víkingur Reykjavík	2−0	0−1	2−1
2023–24	UEFA Europa Conference League	2QR	(Hungary) Kecskemét	3−1 (a.e.t.)	1−2	4−3
2023–24	UEFA Europa Conference League	3QR	(Netherlands) Twente	0−3	0−2	0−5
2024–25	UEFA Conference League	2QR	(Poland) Śląsk Wrocław	1−0	1−3	2−3
2025–26	UEFA Conference League	2QR	(Georgia (country)) Dila Gori	2−1	3−3	5−4
2025–26	UEFA Conference League	3QR	(Israel) Beitar Jerusalem	3−0	1−3	4−3
2025–26	UEFA Conference League	PO	(Czech Republic) Sparta Prague	1−0	0−2	1−2
2026–27	UEFA Champions League	1QR	Ararat-Armenia	0−2	3−2	3−4
2026–27	UEFA Conference League	2QR	(North Macedonia) Vardar	5−2 (a.e.t.)	3−2	8−4
2026–27	UEFA Conference League	3QR	(Hungary) ETO Győr	1−0	1−1	2−1
2026–27	UEFA Conference League	PO	(Faroe Islands) KÍ Klaksvík	2−1	0−0	2−1
2026–27	UEFA Conference League	LP	(Kazakhstan) Kairat	0-0	—N/a	—N/a
2026–27	UEFA Conference League	LP	(Cyprus) Pafos	—N/a	1-1	—N/a
2026–27	UEFA Conference League	LP	(Czech Republic) Jablonec	1-1	—N/a	—N/a
2026–27	UEFA Conference League	LP	(Lithuania) Kauno Žalgiris	—N/a	—N/a	—N/a
2026–27	UEFA Conference League	LP	(Italy) Atalanta	—N/a	—N/a	—N/a
2026–27	UEFA Conference League	LP	(Bosnia and Herzegovina) Borac Banja Luka	—N/a	—N/a	—N/a

Notes

- 1QR: First qualifying round
- 2QR: Second qualifying round
- 3QR: Third qualifying round
- PO: Play-off round

== Honours ==
- Latvian Higher League
  - Champions: 2018, 2019, 2020, 2025
    - Runners-up: 2022, 2023, 2024
- Latvian Cup
  - Winners: 2018, 2023
    - Runners-up: 2016–17, 2017, 2025
- Latvian First League
  - Champions: 2015
- Latvian Supercup
  - Winners: 2024, 2026
    - Runners-up: 2025

== Kits ==
=== Kit suppliers and shirt sponsors ===
Period	Kit manufacturer	Shirt sponsor
2015	Adidas	—
2016	Jako	—
2017	Jako	Marine Service Group
2018	Jako	Marine Service Group
2019	Jako	Marine Service Group
2020	Jako	Marine Service Group
2021	Jako	Marine Service Group
2022	Jako	Marine Service Group

2016
2017–18
2019
2020–22

2016
2017
2018–19
2020–22
2021–22

== Players ==
=== Current squad ===
As of 6 September 2026

Note: Flags indicate national team as defined under FIFA eligibility rules; some limited exceptions apply. Players may hold more than one non-FIFA nationality.

No.	Pos.	Nation	Player
1	GK	LAT	Krišjānis Zviedris
3	DF	BRA	Abner
4	MF	CRC	Orlando Galo
5	DF	CMR	Karl Wassom
6	MF	MLI	Coli Saco
7	MF	TUN	Raki Aouani
8	MF	BRA	Iago Siqueira
9	FW	CRC	Anthony Contreras
10	FW	BRA	Reginaldo Ramires
12	GK	BIH	Kenan Pirić
13	DF	LAT	Raivis Jurkovskis
14	MF	LAT	Renārs Varslavāns
15	FW	POR	Samuel Pedro
17	DF	COL	Andrés Salazar
18	MF	NED	Salah-Eddine Oulad M'Hand
19	FW	GAM	Mohamed Badamosi

No.	Pos.	Nation	Player
21	DF	GHA	Baba Musah
22	MF	SEN	Meissa Diop
23	DF	LAT	Maksims Toņiševs
25	FW	NGR	Abdulrahman Taiwo
27	DF	LAT	Emīls Birka
28	DF	NGR	Emmanuel Maviram
29	DF	LAT	Eriks Maurs-Boks
31	GK	GRE	Athanasios Papadoudis
33	DF	BRA	Paulo Eduardo
34	DF	LAT	Antonijs Černomordijs (captain)
40	MF	GHA	Ahmed Ankrah
44	GK	LAT	Mārcis Kazainis
91	GK	LAT	Frenks Orols
99	FW	BRA	Caio Ferreira

=== Out on loan ===
Note: Flags indicate national team as defined under FIFA eligibility rules; some limited exceptions apply. Players may hold more than one non-FIFA nationality.

No.	Pos.	Nation	Player
6	MF	LAT	Tomašs Mickēvičs (at Ogre United)
16	GK	LAT	Nils Toms Puriņš (at Auda)
70	FW	BRA	Juan Christian (at Juventude)

=== Captains ===
Season	Pos.	Captain
2016	MF	(Latvia) Oļegs Laizāns
2017	DF	(Latvia) Kaspars Gorkšs
2018	DF	(Ukraine) Volodymyr Bayenko
2019	MF	(Latvia) Aleksejs Višņakovs
2020	MF	(Serbia) Stefan Panić
2021	DF	(Latvia) Antonijs Černomordijs
2022	DF	(Latvia) Antonijs Černomordijs
2023	MF	(Serbia) Miloš Jojić
2024	DF	(Latvia) Antonijs Černomordijs

== Current staff ==
As of 1 March 2025

Coaches
Position	Name
Head coach	(Slovakia) Adrián Guľa
Assistant coach	(Latvia) Mareks Zuntners
Coach	(Slovakia) Norbert Gula
Coach	(Slovakia) Peter Argyusi
Coach	(Latvia) Kristaps Blanks
Goalkeeper coach	(Ukraine) Oleksandr Nogin
Fitness coach	(Slovakia) Martin Kojnok
Physiotherapist	(North Macedonia) Nikola Rodic

Medical department
Position	Name
Doctor	(Latvia) Viktors Simanovičs
Doctor	(Latvia) Rolands Brencāns

== Current board ==
As of 13 March 2021

Management and administration
Position	Name
Director-General	(Latvia) Aleksandrs Proņins
Sport director	(Latvia) Aleksandrs Romašins
Executive director	(Latvia) Romāns Lajuks
Administrator	(Latvia) Deniss Čerņikovs
Press officer	(Latvia) Krišs Upenieks
Creative director	(Latvia) Sergejs Sobolevs
Project manager	(Latvia) Andrejs Kaješovs
Photographer	(Latvia) Zigismunds Zālmanis
Video operator	(Latvia) Andrejs Guļko

== Controversies ==
In 2020, it was reported that Russian businessman Sergey Lomakin, the owner of Riga FC, was included in Latvia's persona non grata list. This was denied by the board of the club.

== Notable players ==
Latvia

- (Latvia) Kristaps Blanks
- (Latvia) Boriss Bogdaškins
- (Latvia) Antonijs Černomordijs
- (Latvia) Vladislavs Fjodorovs
- (Latvia) Vladislavs Gabovs
- (Latvia) Kaspars Gorkšs
- (Latvia) Vadims Gospodars
- (Latvia) Vladimirs Kamešs
- (Latvia) Artūrs Karašausks
- (Latvia) Andrejs Kovaļovs
- (Latvia) Sergejs Kožans
- (Latvia) Antons Kurakins
- (Latvia) Oļegs Laizāns
- (Latvia) Ivans Lukjanovs
- (Latvia) Germans Māliņš
- (Latvia) Roberts Ozols
- (Latvia) Andrejs Perepļotkins
- (Latvia) Armands Pētersons
- (Latvia) Ēriks Punculs
- (Latvia) Deniss Rakels
- (Latvia) Deniss Romanovs
- (Latvia) Ritvars Rugins
- (Latvia) Roberts Savaļnieks
- (Latvia) Vitālijs Smirnovs
- (Latvia) Elvis Stuglis
- (Latvia) Valērijs Šabala
- (Latvia) Oļegs Timofejevs
- (Latvia) Daniils Turkovs
- (Latvia) Maksims Uvarenko
- (Latvia) Aleksejs Višņakovs
- (Latvia) Artūrs Zjuzins

Europe

- (Albania) Herdi Prenga
- (Armenia) Edgar Babayan
- (Bosnia and Herzegovina) Adnan Šećerović
- (Croatia) Ivan Brkić
- (Croatia) Ivan Paurević
- (Croatia) Tomislav Šarić
- (Czech Republic) Jakub Hora
- (Estonia) Bogdan Vaštšuk
- (Finland) Mikael Soisalo
- (Georgia (country)) Davit Skhirtladze
- (Greece) Thanos Petsos
- (Greece) Giorgos Valerianos
- (France) Kévin Bérigaud
- (France) Joël Bopesu
- (France) Jean-Baptiste Léo
- (Iceland) Axel Óskar Andrésson
- (Iceland) Stefan Ljubicic
- (Kosovo) Besar Halimi
- (North Macedonia) Egzon Belica
- (Montenegro) Stefan Milošević
- (Montenegro) Milan Vušurović
- (Norway) Abdisalam Ibrahim
- (Poland) Kamil Biliński
- (Portugal) Pedrinho
- (Portugal) Talocha
- (Russia) Khyzyr Appayev
- (Russia) Vitaliy Fedotov
- (Russia) Vladislav Khatazhyonkov
- (Russia) Denis Kniga
- (Russia) Ivan Knyazev
- (Russia) Stanislav Krapukhin
- (Russia) Ivan Sergeyev
- (Russia) Sergei Shumeyko
- (Russia) Danila Yanov
- (Russia) Ivan Yenin
- (Serbia) Dušan Brković
- (Serbia) Marko Đurišić
- (Serbia) Miloš Jojić
- (Serbia) Darko Lemajić
- (Serbia) Mario Maslać
- (Serbia) Stefan Panić
- (Serbia) Nedeljko Piščević
- (Serbia) Miloš Vranjanin
- (Slovenia) Rene Mihelič
- (Sweden) Doug Bergqvist
- (Ukraine) Volodymyr Bayenko
- (Ukraine) Roman Debelko
- (Ukraine) Valeriy Fedorchuk
- (Ukraine) Pavlo Fedosov
- (Ukraine) Oleksandr Filippov
- (Ukraine) Bohdan Kovalenko
- (Ukraine) Ihor Lytovka
- (Ukraine) Myroslav Slavov
- (Ukraine) Vyacheslav Sharpar
- (Ukraine) Yuriy Vakulko
- (Ukraine) Vladlen Yurchenko
- (Ukraine) Serhiy Zahynaylov

Africa

- (Burkina Faso) Aristide Bancé
- (Cameroon) Gaël Etock
- (Democratic Republic of the Congo) Kule Mbombo
- (Democratic Republic of the Congo) Ngonda Muzinga
- (Democratic Republic of the Congo) Jordan Nkololo
- (Ghana) David Addy
- (Ghana) Joselpho Barnes
- (Morocco) Karim Loukili
- (Senegal) Ousseynou Niang
- (Sierra Leone) George Davies
- (Sierra Leone) John Kamara

Asia

- (Japan) Yōsuke Saitō
- (Japan) Minori Sato

South America

- (Argentina) Federico Bravo
- (Argentina) Marcelo Torres
- (Brazil) Douglas Aurélio
- (Brazil) Felipe Brisola
- (Brazil) Dário
- (Brazil) Stênio Júnior
- (Brazil) Wesley Natã
- (Brazil) Thiago Primão
- (Brazil) Gabriel Ramos
- (Brazil) Roger
- (Brazil) Lipe Veloso
- (Colombia) Brayan Angulo
- (Colombia) Juan Camilo Saiz
- (Peru) Luis Iberico

== Former managers ==
Coach	Period			Major Titles	Domestic		
Coach	from	until	days	Major Titles	LČ	LK	1L
(Latvia) Mihails Koņevs	1 March 2015	30 November 2015	274	1	–	–	1
(Russia) Kiril Kurbatov	1 January 2016	10 April 2016	100	–	–	–	–
(Russia) (Turkmenistan) Dmitri Khomukha	11 April 2016	9 August 2016	120	–	–	–	–
(Russia) Vladimir Volchek	12 August 2016	19 April 2017	250	–	–	–	–
(Latvia) Mihails Koņevs (caretaker)	20 April 2017	11 May 2017	21	–	–	–	–
(Russia) Yevgeny Perevertaylo	12 May 2017	29 July 2017	78	–	–	–	–
(Slovenia) Slaviša Stojanović	30 July 2017	31 December 2017	154	–	–	–	–
(North Macedonia) Goce Sedloski	27 January 2018	25 May 2018	118	–	–	–	–
(Latvia) Mihails Koņevs (caretaker)	26 May 2018	4 July 2018	39	–	–	–	–
(Ukraine) Viktor Skrypnyk	5 July 2018	31 January 2019	210	2	1	1	–
(Portugal) Luís Berkemeier Pimenta	5 February 2019	2 March 2019	25	–	–	–	–
(Latvia) Mihails Koņevs (caretaker)	3 March 2019	27 March 2019	24	–	–	–	–
(Belarus) Oleg Kubarev	28 March 2019	26 April 2019	29	–	–	–	–
(Latvia) Mihails Koņevs	27 April 2019	5 February 2020	284	1	1	–	–
(Russia) (Belarus) Oleg Kononov	5 February 2020	11 November 2020	280	–	–	–	–
(Latvia) Mihails Koņevs (caretaker)	12 November 2020	31 December 2020	49	1	1	–	–
(Russia) (South Korea) Denis Laktionov	1 January 2021	25 May 2021	144	–	–	–	–
(Latvia) Kristaps Blanks (caretaker)	27 May 2021	8 June 2021	12	–	–	–	–
(Latvia) Andris Rihters	9 June 2021	10 September 2021	93	–	–	–	–
(North Macedonia) Sashko Poposki (caretaker)	12 September 2021	30 November 2021	79	–	–	–	–
(Germany) Thorsten Fink	4 January 2022	16 May 2022	132	–	–	–	–
(Latvia) Kristaps Blanks (caretaker)	16 May 2022	7 June 2022	22	–	–	–	–
(Croatia) Sandro Perković	7 June 2022	7 January 2023	214	–	–	–	–
(Croatia) Tomislav Stipić	7 January 2023	13 December 2023	340	1	–	1	–
(Finland) Simo Valakari	14 December 2023	1 October 2024	292	–	–	-	–
(Slovakia) Adrián Guľa	14 January 2025		677	–	–	-	–

== Player records ==
=== Most appearances ===
As of 8 November 2025

#	Name	Years	League	Cup	Europe	Other	Total
1	(Latvia) **Antonijs Černomordijs**	2016 – 2017; 2018 – present	206	18	28	2	254
2	(Latvia) Armands Pētersons	2016 – 2023	134	11	22	0	167
3	(Latvia) **Raivis Jurkovskis**	2022 – present	120	8	19	2	149
4	(Latvia) Roberts Ozols	2015 – 2022	105	13	15	0	133
5	(Latvia) **Marko Regža**	2023 – present	99	8	13	2	122
6	(Senegal) **El Bachir Ngom**	2022 – present	94	10	15	1	120
7	(Latvia) Antons Kurakins	2017 – 2022	100	16	2	0	118
8	(Latvia) Oļegs Laizāns	2016 – 2021	96	13	8	0	117
9	(Ghana) **Baba Musah**	2022 - present	83	8	12	2	105
10	(Brazil) Felipe Brisola	2018 – 2021	80	3	18	0	101

- Other – National Super Cup

Bold signifies a current Riga FC player

=== Top goalscorers ===
As of 8 November 2025

#	Name	Years	League	Cup	Europe	Other	Total
1	(Latvia) **Marko Regža**	2023 – present	53	7	1	1	62
2	(Costa Rica) **Anthony Contreras**	2023 – present	23	11	2	0	36
3	(Brazil) **Reginaldo Ramires**	2023 – present	28	5	2	0	35
4	(Serbia) Darko Lemajić	2017 – 2019	23	3	0	0	26
5	(Spain) **Brian Peña**	2023 – present	19	1	0	0	20
6	(Finland) Mikael Soisalo	2021 – 2023	16	0	3	0	19
7	(Latvia) **Antonijs Černomordijs**	2016 – 2017; 2018 – present	16	0	2	0	18
8	(Brazil) Felipe Brisola	2018 – 2021	15	2	1	0	18
9	(Brazil) Douglas Aurélio	2022 – 2023	13	1	3	0	17
10	(Brazil) Gabriel Ramos	2021 – 2022	12	0	3	0	15

- Other – National Super Cup

Bold signifies a current Riga FC player
