= 2018 Latvian Football Cup =

Football competition held in Latvia

Tournament details
- Country: Latvia
- Teams: 49

Final positions
- Champions: Riga FC
- Runners-up: Ventspils

Tournament statistics
- Matches played: 48
- Goals scored: 269 (5.6 per match)

The 2018 Latvian Football Cup was the 24th edition of the football tournament. This edition of the competition began on 26 May 2018 and ended on 24 October 2018. Liepāja were the defending champions, having won the final 2–0 over Riga FC.

== Format ==
This season, the Latvian Football Cup was a single elimination tournament between 49 teams. Matches which were level at the end of regulation proceeded to extra time and afterwards to penalties, when needed, to determine the winning club.

== First round ==
Nine first round matches were played from 26 May to 2 June 2018. The draw for the first round was held 15 May 2018.

Team 1	Score	Team 2
FC BetLanes	14–0	K.F. Grobina
FK Karosta	9–1	FK Madona
FK Priekuļi	2–3	FK Jūrnieks
FK Lielupe	2–5	FC Nikers
AFA Olaine	1–5	SK Babīte
FK Kauguri	4–0	Bauskas BJSS/SC Mēmele
Salaspils	9–0	FK Valka
Cēsis	1–4	Albatroz SC
SK Upesciems	5–2	Degumnieki/MBJSS

== Second round ==
Sixteen second round matches were played on 15–18 June 2018. The draw for the second round was held on 5 June 2018.

Team 1	Score	Team 2
FK Pļaviņas DM	1–9	FK Auda
Salaspils	0–7	FC BetLanes
FK Alberts	1–2	FK Traktors
FK Priekuļi	3–6	FK Limbaži
SK Super Nova	2–1	SK Babīte
Talsi/FK Laidze	3–5	Ogres NSC
Ghetto FC/Gvatar	5–0	FK Aliance
FK Salacgrīva	0–10	Riga United
JDFS Alberts	3–1	FC Nikers
Monarhs/Flaminko	2–4 (a.e.t.)	BFC Daugavpils
Grobiņas SC	7–1	Albatroz SC
Balvu Sporta centrs	1–4	FK Smiltene/BJSS
FK Kauguri	3–3 (a.e.t.) (4–5 p)	FK Tukums 2000 TSS
Rēzeknes FA/BJSS	0–2	RTU FC
FK Karosta	1–3	Preiļu BJSS
FK Staiceles Bebri	3–0	SK Upesciems

== Third round ==
Eight third round matches were played from 30 June to 2 July 2018.

Team 1	Score	Team 2
FK Traktors	0–7	Grobiņas SC
RTU FC	5–0	FK Tukums 2000 TSS
Riga United	1–9	Ghetto FC/Gvatar
FC BetLanes	2–0	FK Auda
FK Smiltene/BJSS	0–2	SK Super Nova
FK Limbaži	3–2	Ogres NSC
Preiļu BJSS	5–0	FK Staiceles Bebri
BFC Daugavpils	5–0	JDFS Alberts

== Fourth round ==
Eight fourth round matches were played on 6–7 July 2018. The draw for the fourth round was held on 2 July 2018.

Team 1	Score	Team 2
Ghetto FC/Gvatar	1–8	Spartaks Jūrmala
SK Super Nova	0–2	Riga
Preiļu BJSS	0–3	Valmiera Glass ViA
METTA/LU	2–1	Jelgava
Grobiņas SC	2–6	BFC Daugavpils
FK Limbaži	0–15	RFS
RTU FC	0–5	Liepāja
FC BetLanes	1–2	Ventspils

== Quarter–finals ==
Four quarter–final matches were played on 4–6 August 2018. The draw for the quarter–finals was held on 11 July 2018.

Team 1	Score	Team 2
Liepāja	0–1 (a.e.t.)	Ventspils
BFC Daugavpils	3–3 (a.e.t.) (1–4 p)	METTA/LU
Valmiera Glass ViA	0–3	RFS
Riga	3–1	Spartaks Jūrmala

== Semi–finals ==
The two semi–final matches were played on 19 September 2018. The draw for the semi–finals was held on 9 August 2018.

Team 1	Score	Team 2
METTA/LU	1–2	Riga
Ventspils	2–1	RFS

== Final ==
The final was played on 24 October 2018.

24 October 2018
20:15

Riga	0–0 (a.e.t.)	Ventspils
	(Report)
Penalties
Lukjanovs (penalty scored); Rakels (penalty missed); Biliński (penalty missed); Brisola (penalty scored); Panić (penalty scored); Bajenko (penalty scored); Šarić (penalty scored)	5–4	(penalty scored) Aiyegun; (penalty scored) Pinto Fortes; (penalty missed) Rugins; (penalty missed) Tidenbergs; (penalty scored) Neziri; (penalty scored) Žulevs; (penalty missed) Bulvitis

„Daugavas“ stadionas, Riga
Attendance: 1 000
Referee: Dmitrijs Naļivaiko

== See also ==
2018 Latvian Higher League
