= 2020 Latvian Higher League =

Latvian football league season for the highest division

Latvian Higher League
- Season: 2020
- Dates: 15 June 2020 – 29 November 2020
- Champions: Riga
- Relegated: Tukums
- Champions League: Riga
- Conference League: RFS; Valmiera; Liepāja
- Matches: 135
- Goals: 415 (3.07 per match)
- Top goalscorer: Dodô (18 goals)
- Biggest home win: Spartaks Jūrmala 7–0 Jelgava (26 November 2020)
- Biggest away win: Jelgava 0–7 Liepāja (29 November 2020)
- Highest scoring: Liepāja 2–5 RFS (30 June 2020); RFS 5–2 Valmiera (29 July 2020); Riga 5–2 Tukums (23 August 2020); Spartaks Jūrmala 7–0 Jelgava (26 November 2020); Jelgava 0–7 Liepāja (29 November 2020)
- Longest winning run: 14 matches Riga
- Longest unbeaten run: 14 matches Riga
- Longest winless run: 20 matches Tukums
- Longest losing run: 6 matches Tukums
- All statistics correct as of 29 November 2020.

The 2020 Latvian Higher League, known as the Optibet Virslīga for sponsorship reasons, was the 29th season of top-tier football in Latvia. The season began on 15 June 2020 and ended on 29 November 2020. The league winners earned a place in the UEFA Champions League and the second and third-placed clubs earned a place in the new UEFA Europa Conference League.

Riga were the defending champions after winning the league the previous season.

== Teams ==
The nine clubs from the previous season remained in the league and Tukums joined as champions of 1.Liga.

Locations of the 2020 Latvian Higher League teams

== League table ==
Pos	Team	Pld	W	D	L	GF	GA	GD	Pts	Qualification or relegation
1	Riga (C)	27	23	0	4	60	21	+39	69	Qualification for the Champions League first qualifying round
2	Rīgas FS	27	21	3	3	66	21	+45	66	Qualification for the Europa Conference League first qualifying round
3	Valmiera/BSS	27	13	8	6	47	33	+14	47	Qualification for the Europa Conference League first qualifying round
4	Ventspils	27	12	8	7	40	25	+15	44	
5	Liepāja	27	12	6	9	57	34	+23	42	Qualification for the Europa Conference League first qualifying round (Note: Liepāja qualified for the Europa Conference League as the 2020 Latvian Football Cup winners.)
6	Spartaks Jūrmala	27	11	7	9	53	44	+9	40	
7	Jelgava	27	6	4	17	19	64	−45	22	
8	Daugavpils	27	5	5	17	30	48	−18	20	
9	Metta/LU	27	4	4	19	22	55	−33	16	
10	Tukums (R)	27	3	5	19	21	70	−49	14	Relegation to the Latvian First League

Source: Soccerway
Rules for classification: 1) Points; 2) Head-to-head points; 3) Head-to-head goal difference; 4) Goal difference; 5) Goals scored; 6) Fair-play ranking; 7) Play-off.
(C) Champions; (R) Relegated

== Results ==
=== Rounds 1–18 ===
Rounds 1–18
Home \ Away	DAU	JEL	LIE	MLU	RIG	RFS	SPJ	TUK	VAL	VEN
Daugavpils		0–0	0–2	4–2	0–1	2–3	0–2	1–1	0–2	3–1
Jelgava	1–0		1–5	2–2	0–3	0–4	2–3	2–1	1–2	1–0
Liepāja	1–1	3–1		3–0	1–4	2–5	3–2	2–2	0–1	1–1
Metta / LU	1–4	1–0	2–1		0–3	0–1	1–2	2–0	2–2	1–2
Riga	3–1	3–0	2–0	2–0		0–2	4–2	5–2	2–0	1–0
Rīgas FS	2–1	1–0	3–0	5–1	1–2		4–1	3–0	5–2	1–0
Spartaks Jūrmala	3–3	4–1	2–2	2–0	2–1	1–1		1–1	2–3	1–3
Tukums	0–6	1–2	0–5	1–3	1–5	0–3	0–2		2–3	0–0
Valmiera / BSS	3–0	2–0	1–1	1–0	0–1	0–4	2–2	2–0		3–0
Ventspils	2–0	5–0	2–1	0–0	0–2	3–2	1–1	3–0	2–2	

Source: soccerway
Legend: Blue = home team win; Yellow = draw; Red = away team win.

=== Rounds 19–27 ===
Rounds 19–27
Home \ Away	DAU	JEL	LIE	MLU	RIG	RFS	SPJ	TUK	VAL	VEN
Daugavpils			0–4	1–0		1–2	1–3			0–0
Jelgava	2–0		0–7		0–2				2–2	0–5
Liepāja				3–0		1–0	0–1	5–0	1–1	
Metta / LU		0–1				0–3	1–1		1–2	
Riga	2–0		2–1	5–1					1–0	0–3
Rīgas FS		1–0			3–0		2–1			1–1
Spartaks Jūrmala		7–0			1–2			2–4		1–2
Tukums	2–1	0–0		3–1	0–2	0–2				
Valmiera / BSS	3–0					2–2	0–1	5–0		
Ventspils			0–2	1–0				2–0	1–1	

Source: soccerway
Legend: Blue = home team win; Yellow = draw; Red = away team win.

== Statistics ==
=== Top scorers ===
As of matches played 29 November 2020

Rank	Player	Club	Goals
1	(Brazil) Dodô	Liepāja	18
2	(Nigeria) Tolu Arokodare	Valmiera	15
2	(Serbia) Nemanja Belaković	Spartaks	15
4	(Democratic Republic of the Congo) Kule Mbombo	Riga	12
5	(Russia) Yevgeni Kozlov	Ventspils	11
5	(Latvia) Raimonds Krollis	METTA/LU	11
7	(Nigeria) Chinonso Offor	Daugavpils; RFS	10
7	(Brazil) Emerson Deocleciano	RFS	10
9	(Latvia) Artūrs Karašausks	Liepāja	9
10	(Ivory Coast) Alain Kouadio	RFS	8
10	(Austria) Tomáš Šimkovič	RFS	8
10	(Latvia) Kaspars Svārups	Ventspils	8
