= 2018 Latvian Higher League =

Latvian football league season for the highest division

Latvian Higher League
- Season: 2018
- Champions: Riga
- Champions League: Riga
- Europa League: Ventspils; RFS; Liepāja
- Matches: 112
- Goals: 315 (2.81 per match)
- Top goalscorer: Darko Lemajic (15)

The 2018 Latvian Higher League was the 27th season of top-tier football in Latvia. Spartaks Jūrmala were the defending champions, having won their second title in the previous season.

== Teams ==
Locations of the 2018 Latvian Higher League teams

At the end of the 2017 season, Babīte were excluded from the league due to match-fixing. This resulted in METTA/LU ending up as the bottom-placed team. They were sent to the relegation playoffs against FK Progress/AFA Olaine. METTA/LU won, keeping them in the Latvian Higher League.

Babīte were replaced by the champions of the 2017 Latvian First League, Valmieras FK.

Club	Location	Stadium	Capacity
Valmieras	Valmiera	J. Daliņa stadions	2,000
Jelgava	Jelgava	Olympic Sports Center of Zemgale	1,560
Liepāja	Liepāja	Daugava Stadium	5,008
Metta/LU	Riga	Hanzas vidusskolas laukums	2,000
RFS	Riga	Stadions Arkādija	1,000
Riga	Riga	Skonto Stadium	8,207
Spartaks Jūrmala	Jūrmala	Slokas Stadium	2,800
Ventspils	Ventspils	Ventspils Olimpiskais Stadions	3,044

Source: Scoresway

=== Kits manufacturer and sponsors ===
Club	Kit manufacturer	Sponsor
FK Jelgava	Nike	Igate
FK Liepāja	Adidas	Mogo
FS Metta/LU	Nike	
Riga FC	Jako	
Rīgas Futbola skola	Nike	LNK Group
FK Spartaks Jūrmala	Nike	Hanseatisches Fußball Kontor
FK Ventspils	Adidas	VK Tranzīts
Valmiera Glass ViA	Nike	Valmiera Glass

== League table ==
Pos	Team	Pld	W	D	L	GF	GA	GD	Pts	Qualification or relegation
1	Riga (C)	28	20	4	4	45	16	+29	64	Qualification for the Champions League first qualifying round
2	Ventspils	28	18	6	4	54	22	+32	60	Qualification for the Europa League first qualifying round
3	RFS	28	18	1	9	57	23	+34	55	Qualification for the Europa League first qualifying round
4	Liepāja	28	15	6	7	46	25	+21	51	Qualification for the Europa League first qualifying round
5	Spartaks Jūrmala	28	12	6	10	48	37	+11	42	
6	Jelgava	28	6	3	19	19	48	−29	21	
7	METTA/LU (O)	28	5	4	19	24	52	−28	19	Qualification for the relegation play-offs
8	Valmiera Glass ViA	28	2	2	24	22	92	−70	8	

Source: Soccerway
Rules for classification: 1) Points; 2) Head-to-head points; 3) Head-to-head goal difference; 4) Goal difference; 5) Goals scored; 6) Fair-play ranking; 7) Play-off.
(C) Champions; (O) Play-off winners

== Results ==
Each team played the other seven teams home-and-away twice, for a total of 28 games each.

First half of the season
Home \ Away	JEL	LIE	MLU	RFS	RIG	SPJ	VAL	VEN
Jelgava	—	0–2	1–1	0–2	0–1	1–0	5–1	0–2
Liepāja	3–1	—	0–1	3–5	1–0	1–1	4–0	1–4
METTA/LU	3–0	0–3	—	0–1	0–1	1–3	2–2	2–2
RFS	3–0	0–1	3–1	—	2–1	0–2	4–0	3–1
Riga	1–0	2–2	1–0	1–2	—	1–0	6–1	1–0
Spartaks Jūrmala	1–0	2–2	3–0	0–2	0–1	—	3–0	1–2
Valmiera	1–4	0–2	1–1	0–6	0–2	2–4	—	1–3
Ventspils	0–0	1–1	3–1	1–1	1–0	1–2	3–1	—

Legend: Blue = home team win; Yellow = draw; Red = away team win.

Second half of the season
Home \ Away	JEL	LIE	MLU	RFS	RIG	SPJ	VAL	VEN
Jelgava	—	0–2	1–0	0–4	0–3	0–0	3–2	0–3
Liepāja	2–0	—	0–1	1–0	0–0	1–0	6–2	0–1
METTA/LU	1–2	0–2	—	0–2	0–2	0–3	2–1	0–2
RFS	1–0	0–1	3–0	—	1–2	0–1	3–0	1–2
Riga	2–0	1–0	2–1	1–0	—	4–4	3–0	0–0
Spartaks Jūrmala	4–1	2–2	4–3	0–4	1–3	—	4–0	1–2
Valmiera	1–0	0–3	0–2	2–4	0–2	2–1	—	1–6
Ventspils	2–0	1–0	4–1	2–0	0–1	1–1	4–1	—

Legend: Blue = home team win; Yellow = draw; Red = away team win.

== Relegation play-offs ==
The seventh-placed team from the 2018 Higher League faced the runners-up of the 2018 Latvian First League in a two-legged play-off. The winner, METTA/LU, earned the right to participate in the 2019 Higher League.

14 November 2018 1st leg	METTA/LU	7–2	SK Super Nova

17 November 2018 2nd leg	SK Super Nova	0–3 (2–10 agg.)	METTA/LU

=== Top scorers ===
As of 13 November 2018

Rank	Player	Club	Goals
1	(Serbia) Darko Lemajić	Riga	15
2	(Ukraine) Maksym Marusych	RFS	14
3	(Latvia) Aleksejs Višņakovs	Spartaks Jūrmala	13
3	(Nigeria) Adeleke Akinyemi	Ventspils	13
3	(Nigeria) Tosin Aiyegun	Ventspils	13
4	(Latvia) Ģirts Karlsons	Liepāja	10
5	(Latvia) Jānis Ikaunieks	Liepāja	9
6	(Latvia) Roberts Uldriķis	RFS	7
6	(Russia) Tamirlan Dzhamalutdinov	METTA/LU	7
