= 2019 Latvian Higher League =

Latvian Higher League
- Season: 2019
- Champions: Riga
- Champions League: Riga
- Europa League: RFS; Ventspils; Valmiera Glass ViA
- Matches: 144
- Goals: 384 (2.67 per match)
- Top goalscorer: Darko Lemajic (15)

The 2019 Latvian Higher League, known as the Optibet Virslīga for sponsorship reasons, was the 28th season of top-tier football in Latvia. The season began on 9 March 2019 and ended on 9 November 2019.

Riga were the defending champions from the previous season.

== Teams ==
Locations of the 2019 Latvian Higher League teams

All eight clubs from the previous season remained in the league with Daugavpils joining the league as champions of 1.Liga 2018.

| Club | Location | Stadium | Capacity |
|---|---|---|---|
| BFC Daugavpils | Daugavpils | Celtnieks Stadium | 4,070 |
| FK Jelgava | Jelgava | Olympic Sports Center of Zemgale | 1,560 |
| FK Liepāja | Liepāja | Daugava Stadium | 5,008 |
| FK Metta/LU | Riga | Hanzas vidusskolas laukums | 2,000 |
| Riga FC | Riga | Skonto Stadium | 8,207 |
| FK RFS | Riga | Stadions Arkādija | 1,000 |
| FK Spartaks Jūrmala | Jūrmala | Slokas Stadium | 2,800 |
| FK Valmiera Glass ViA | Valmiera | J. Daliņa stadions | 2,000 |
| FK Ventspils | Ventspils | Ventspils Olimpiskais Stadions | 3,044 |

== League table ==
| Pos | Team | Pld | W | D | L | GF | GA | GD | Pts | Qualification or relegation |
|---|---|---|---|---|---|---|---|---|---|---|
| 1 | Riga (C) | 32 | 20 | 6 | 6 | 59 | 21 | +38 | 66 | Qualification for the Champions League first qualifying round |
| 2 | RFS | 32 | 17 | 8 | 7 | 55 | 32 | +23 | 59 | Qualification for the Europa League first qualifying round (Note: Since the winners of the 2019 Latvian Football Cup, RFS, qualified for European competition based on their league position, the spot awarded to the Cup winner passed to the next best-placed team, the fourth-placed team.) |
| 3 | Ventspils | 32 | 12 | 11 | 9 | 47 | 43 | +4 | 47 | Qualification for the Europa League first qualifying round |
| 4 | Valmiera Glass ViA | 32 | 12 | 10 | 10 | 37 | 34 | +3 | 46 | Qualification for the Europa League first qualifying round |
| 5 | Spartaks Jūrmala | 32 | 13 | 5 | 14 | 49 | 64 | −15 | 44 | |
| 6 | Liepāja | 32 | 11 | 6 | 15 | 41 | 43 | −2 | 39 | |
| 7 | Jelgava | 32 | 9 | 11 | 12 | 34 | 37 | −3 | 38 | |
| 8 | Daugavpils | 32 | 8 | 7 | 17 | 27 | 50 | −23 | 31 | |
| 9 | METTA/LU (O) | 32 | 6 | 8 | 18 | 35 | 60 | −25 | 26 | Qualification for the relegation play-offs |

Source: Soccerway
Rules for classification: 1) Points; 2) Head-to-head points; 3) Head-to-head goal difference; 4) Goal difference; 5) Goals scored; 6) Fair-play ranking; 7) Play-off.
(C) Champions; (O) Play-off winners

== Results ==
Each club played the other eight clubs home-and-away twice, for a total of 32 matches each.

First half of the season
| Home \ Away | DAU | JEL | LIE | MLU | RFS | RIG | SPJ | VAL | VEN |
|---|---|---|---|---|---|---|---|---|---|
| Daugavpils | | 0–2 | 1–0 | 1–0 | 0–1 | 0–1 | 4–1 | 1–0 | 0–3 |
| Jelgava | 1–0 | | 1–2 | 1–2 | 0–0 | 0–1 | 0–3 | 0–1 | 2–1 |
| Liepāja | 2–3 | 1–0 | | 2–1 | 0–0 | 1–2 | 0–1 | 1–0 | 4–0 |
| METTA/LU | 0–1 | 2–1 | 1–2 | | 1–2 | 1–2 | 3–0 | 1–4 | 2–1 |
| RFS | 3–2 | 2–1 | 2–0 | 2–2 | | 3–1 | 0–0 | 0–1 | 4–1 |
| Riga | 4–0 | 1–1 | 1–0 | 2–1 | 2–0 | | 6–1 | 0–1 | 2–0 |
| Spartaks Jūrmala | 3–0 | 1–2 | 1–0 | 1–0 | 2–3 | 0–4 | | 2–0 | 4–3 |
| Valmiera | 2–0 | 0–0 | 1–0 | 0–2 | 0–2 | 1–0 | 1–2 | | 1–1 |
| Ventspils | 1–1 | 1–1 | 1–1 | 2–0 | 2–0 | 1–0 | 2–1 | 2–2 | |

Source: soccerway
Legend: Blue = home team win; Yellow = draw; Red = away team win.

Second half of the season
| Home \ Away | DAU | JEL | LIE | MLU | RFS | RIG | SPJ | VAL | VEN |
|---|---|---|---|---|---|---|---|---|---|
| Daugavpils | | 2–2 | 1–0 | 0–0 | 0–1 | 0–3 | 2–3 | 2–2 | 1–1 |
| Jelgava | 2–2 | | 0–0 | 1–0 | 1–1 | 0–0 | 5–2 | 0–0 | 1–2 |
| Liepāja | 1–2 | 3–1 | | 2–1 | 3–3 | 2–2 | 2–2 | 2–3 | 1–2 |
| METTA/LU | 1–0 | 0–3 | 2–3 | | 1–1 | 0–4 | 1–1 | 0–0 | 3–3 |
| RFS | 2–0 | 2–0 | 1–2 | 6–1 | | 1–2 | 6–0 | 1–0 | 2–1 |
| Riga | 2–0 | 0–1 | 1–0 | 5–0 | 1–1 | | 4–1 | 0–0 | 0–0 |
| Spartaks Jūrmala | 2–0 | 1–2 | 4–2 | 2–2 | 1–0 | 2–4 | | 3–0 | 0–1 |
| Valmiera | 1–1 | 3–1 | 2–1 | 3–3 | 1–3 | 0–1 | 3–0 | | 2–0 |
| Ventspils | 3–0 | 1–1 | 0–1 | 2–1 | 3–0 | 2–1 | 2–2 | 2–2 | |

Source: soccerway
Legend: Blue = home team win; Yellow = draw; Red = away team win.

== Relegation play-offs ==
The ninth-placed team from the 2019 Higher League played the runners-up of the 2019 Latvian First League in a two-legged play-off on 13–16 November 2019. The winner, METTA/LU, will remain in the Latvian Higher League.

| 13 November 2019 1st leg | METTA/LU | 0–0 | SK Super Nova |
| 17:30 |

| 16 November 2019 2nd leg | SK Super Nova | 1–3 (1–3 agg.) | METTA/LU |
| 13:00 |

== Statistics ==
=== Top scorers ===
As of match played 30 October 2019

| Rank | Player | Club | Goals |
|---|---|---|---|
| 1 | (Serbia) Darko Lemajić | Riga | 15 |
| 2 | (Nigeria) Tosin Aiyegun | Ventspils | 11 |
| 3 | (Serbia) Nemanja Belaković | Spartaks Jūrmala | 10 |
| 3 | (Russia) Tamirlan Dzhamalutdinov | METTA/LU | 10 |
| 5 | (Austria) Tomáš Šimkovič | RFS | 8 |
| 5 | (Azerbaijan) Vugar Asgarov | BFC Daugavpils | 8 |
| 7 | (Nigeria) Tolu Arokodare | Valmiera | 7 |
| 7 | (Latvia) Jānis Ikaunieks | Liepāja | 7 |
| 9 | (Ukraine) Roman Debelko | Riga | 6 |
| 9 | (Slovakia) Tomáš Malec | RFS | 6 |
| 9 | (South Africa) Kgotso Masangane | METTA/LU | 6 |
| 9 | (Angola) Amâncio Fortes | Liepāja | 6 |
| 9 | (Latvia) Daniils Ulimbaševs | Ventspils | 6 |
