= List of Latvian football transfers winter 2025–26 =

This is a list of Latvian football transfers in the winter transfer window 2025-26 by club. Only clubs of the 2026 Latvian Higher League and 2026 Latvian First League are included.

== Latvian Higher League ==
=== Riga ===
In: Note: Flags indicate national team as defined under FIFA eligibility rules; some limited exceptions apply. Players may hold more than one non-FIFA nationality.

No.	Pos.	Nation	Player
—	GK	LAT	Nils Toms Puriņš (loan return from Super Nova)
—	GK	LAT	Frenks Orols (from RFS)
—	DF	BRA	Paulo Eduardo (loan return from Auda)
—	DF	COL	Andrés Salazar (from (Colombia) Atlético Nacional)
—	DF	CMR	Karl Gameni Wassom (from Auda)
—	DF	BRA	Abner (on loan from (Brazil) Juventude)
—	MF	TUN	Raki Aouani (from (Tunisia) Étoile du Sahel)
—	MF	BRA	Caio Ferreira (from (Romania) Argeș Pitești)
—	MF	NED	Salah-Eddine Oulad M'Hand (from (England) Arsenal U21s)
—	MF	BRA	Juan Christian (from (Brazil) Juventude)
—	FW	CMR	Benato Bekima (loan return from Tukums 2000)
—	FW	GAM	Mohamed Badamosi (from (Romania) CFR Cluj)

Out: Note: Flags indicate national team as defined under FIFA eligibility rules; some limited exceptions apply. Players may hold more than one non-FIFA nationality.

No.	Pos.	Nation	Player
—	GK	LAT	Nils Toms Puriņš (to Auda)
—	DF	COD	Ngonda Muzinga (Released)
—	DF	CMR	Karl Gameni Wassom (to Auda)
—	DF	SEN	Mouhamed El Bachir Ngom (to (Switzerland) Grasshoppers)
—	MF	PER	Joao Grimaldo (loan return to (Serbia) Partizan)
—	MF	COD	Gauthier Mankenda (to RFS)
—	MF	NGR	Hussaini Ibrahim (to Auda)
—	FW	LAT	Marko Regža (to (Czech Republic) FC Hradec Králové)
—	FW	BFA	Ousmane Camara (to Auda, was on loan)
—	FW	SEN	Meleye Diagne (on loan to Auda)

=== RFS ===
In: Note: Flags indicate national team as defined under FIFA eligibility rules; some limited exceptions apply. Players may hold more than one non-FIFA nationality.

No.	Pos.	Nation	Player
—	GK	LAT	Frenks Orols (loan return from Grobiņa)
—	GK	LAT	Vladislavs Razumejevs (on loan from Daugavpils)
—	DF	LAT	Roberts Veips (from FS Jelgava, was on loan)
—	MF	GAM	Modou Saidy (loan return from BFC Daugavpils)
—	MF	JPN	Mikaze Nagasawa (loan return from Tukums 2000)
—	MF	JPN	Yukiyoshi Karashima (loan return from (Finland) HJK Helsinki)
—	MF	NGR	Shina Kumater (from (Nigeria) Final Touch FA)
—	MF	POR	Matheus Clemente (from Auda)
—	MF	COD	Gauthier Mankenda (from Riga)
—	FW	LAT	Rodrigo Gaučis (loan return from Grobiņa)
—	FW	LAT	Valerijs Lizunovs (loan return from BFC Daugavpils)
—	FW	LAT	Niks Dusalijevs (on loan from Tukums 2000)
—	FW	CMR	Rostand Ndjiki (from (Spain) Leganés B, was on loan)
—	FW	NGR	Kingsley Emenike (on loan from Jelgava)
—	FW	UKR	Daniel Kiwinda (Free agent)

Out: Note: Flags indicate national team as defined under FIFA eligibility rules; some limited exceptions apply. Players may hold more than one non-FIFA nationality.

No.	Pos.	Nation	Player
—	GK	LAT	Pāvels Šteinbors (Retired)
—	GK	LAT	Frenks Orols (to Riga)
—	GK	LAT	Sergejs Vilkovs (on loan to Super Nova)
—	DF	CZE	Petr Mareš (to (Czech Republic) Zbrojovka)
—	DF	LAT	Elvis Stuglis (to Riga Mariners)
—	DF	LAT	Rendijs Šibass (to Metta)
—	DF	GAM	Alfusainey Jatta (Released)
—	MF	ARG	Facundo García (on loan to Super Nova)
—	MF	LAT	Roberts Meļķis (loan return to Liepāja)
—	MF	BRA	Vitinho (loan return to (Brazil) Atlético-MG)
—	MF	LAT	Gļebs Žaleiko (to Jelgava, was on loan)
—	MF	CGO	Ceti Junior Tchibinda (to Daugavpils)
—	MF	JPN	Yukiyoshi Karashima (to (Lithuania) FK Kauno Žalgiris)
—	FW	SEN	Barthélemy Diedhiou (loan return to Daugavpils)
—	FW	MTQ	Jérémie Porsan-Clémenté (Released)
—	FW	LAT	Dāvis Ikaunieks (to (Lithuania) FK Kauno Žalgiris)
—	FW	LAT	Valerijs Lizunovs (on loan to Super Nova)
—	FW	BFA	Faycal Konate (to (Czech Republic) Karviná)
—	FW	NED	Tayrell Wouter (to (Serbia) OFK Beograd)
—	FW	CIV	Mamadou Sylla (to Daugavpils)
—	FW	UKR	Daniel Kiwinda (on loan to Daugavpils)
—	FW	CMR	Rostand Ndjiki (on loan to Daugavpils)

=== Liepāja ===
In: Note: Flags indicate national team as defined under FIFA eligibility rules; some limited exceptions apply. Players may hold more than one non-FIFA nationality.

No.	Pos.	Nation	Player
—	GK	LAT	Ņikita Parfjonovs (loan return from Tukums 2000)
—	GK	LAT	Alvis Sorokins (on loan from Metta/LU)
—	DF	LAT	Alans Kangars (loan return from Metta/LU)
—	DF	LAT	Aleksandrs Molotkovs (loan return from Metta/LU)
—	DF	LAT	Oskars Vientiess (loan return from Tukums 2000)
—	DF	GEO	Nikoloz Chikovani (loan return from (Lithuania) DFK Dainava)
—	DF	CIV	Mory Cissé (from (Ivory Coast) AS Denguélé)
—	DF	NED	Bart Straalman (from (Finland) Inter Turku)
—	DF	LUX	Marvin Martins (from (Switzerland) Winterthur)
—	MF	LAT	Ivans Patrikejevs (loan return from (Estonia) Nõmme Kalju)
—	MF	LAT	Roberts Meļķis (loan return from RFS)
—	MF	MTN	Amar Haidara (loan return from (Lithuania) Sūduva)
—	MF	CIV	Rodolphe Ekou (from (Ivory Coast) SOL FC Abobo)
—	MF	KEN	Irad Mshindi (from (Sweden) Enköpings SK)
—	MF	BRA	Fellipe Vieira (from (Slovakia) Šamorín)
—	MF	LAT	Markuss Ivulāns (from Metta)
—	FW	LAT	Ingars Pūlis (loan return from Tukums 2000)
—	FW	SMA	Chovanie Amatkarijo (from (Sweden) GAIS)

Out: Note: Flags indicate national team as defined under FIFA eligibility rules; some limited exceptions apply. Players may hold more than one non-FIFA nationality.

No.	Pos.	Nation	Player
—	GK	LAT	Iļja Isajevs (Released)
—	GK	LAT	Ņikita Parfjonovs (on loan to Ogre United)
—	DF	MNE	Anto Babić (to (Montenegro) Sutjeska)
—	DF	MNE	Marko Simić (to (Serbia) Radnički Obrenovac)
—	DF	LAT	Alans Kangars (to Jelgava)
—	DF	GEO	Nikoloz Chikovani (to (Georgia (country)) Rustavi)
—	DF	LTU	Edvinas Girdvainis (to (Lithuania) TransINVEST)
—	DF	LAT	Aleksandrs Molotkovs (on loan to Grobiņa)
—	DF	LAT	Oskars Vientiess (on loan to (Czech Republic) Chrudim)
—	DF	LAT	Rūdolfs Meļķis (on loan to Tukums 2000)
—	MF	CRO	Marin Laušić (to (Slovakia) Spartak Trnava)
—	MF	LAT	Roberts Meļķis (to Jelgava)
—	MF	LAT	Aleksejs Saveļjevs (to (Kyrgyzstan) Asia)
—	MF	LAT	Markuss Ivulāns (on loan to Ogre United)
—	FW	SUI	Tresor Samba (to (Switzerland) Étoile Carouge)
—	FW	SEN	Mouhamadou Diaw (Released)
—	FW	NGR	Joseph Oloko (on loan to Tukums 2000)

=== Daugavpils ===
In: Note: Flags indicate national team as defined under FIFA eligibility rules; some limited exceptions apply. Players may hold more than one non-FIFA nationality.

No.	Pos.	Nation	Player
—	GK	LAT	Vladislavs Razumejevs (Free agent)
—	DF	NED	Ziad Ouled (from (Albania) Tirana)
—	DF	SEN	Papa Gningue (from (United Arab Emirates) Elite Falcons)
—	MF	CGO	Ceti Junior Tchibinda (from RFS)
—	MF	GHA	Elijah Addai (from (Ghana) Heroes)
—	FW	SEN	Barthélemy Diedhiou (loan return from RFS)
—	FW	NGR	Joel Yakubu (on loan from (Czech Republic) Slovan Liberec B)
—	FW	CIV	Mamadou Sylla (from RFS)
—	FW	UKR	Daniel Kiwinda (on loan from RFS)
—	FW	CMR	Rostand Ndjiki (on loan from RFS)
—	FW	CMR	William Mukwelle (from (Czech Republic) Pardubice B)
—	FW	CIV	Abdoul Kader Traoré (from Auda)

Out: Note: Flags indicate national team as defined under FIFA eligibility rules; some limited exceptions apply. Players may hold more than one non-FIFA nationality.

No.	Pos.	Nation	Player
—	GK	LAT	Vladislavs Razumejevs (on loan to RFS)
—	DF	ENG	Wasiri Williams (to (Republic of Ireland) Galway United)
—	DF	LAT	Aleksejs Kudeļkins (to (Romania) Metalul)
—	DF	JPN	Shunsuke Murakami (Released)
—	MF	GAM	Modou Saidy (loan return to RFS)
—	MF	NGR	Promise Victor (loan return to Jelgava)
—	MF	NGR	Kumater Shina (loan return to (Nigeria) Final Touch FA)
—	MF	GAM	Wally Fofana (to Auda)
—	MF	LAT	Jevgeņijs Miņins (to Auda)
—	MF	LAT	Ņikita Barkovskis (on loan to Super Nova)
—	MF	CIV	Mohamed Koné (Released)
—	FW	LAT	Valerijs Lizunovs (loan return to RFS)
—	FW	SEN	Barthélemy Diedhiou (to Auda)

=== Auda ===
In: Note: Flags indicate national team as defined under FIFA eligibility rules; some limited exceptions apply. Players may hold more than one non-FIFA nationality.

No.	Pos.	Nation	Player
—	GK	LAT	Raivo Stūriņš (loan return from Tukums 2000)
—	GK	LAT	Nils Toms Puriņš (from Riga, previously on loan at Super Nova)
—	DF	MLI	Abdoul Razak Touré (from (Mali) Guidars)
—	DF	CMR	Karl Gameni Wassom (from Riga)
—	DF	PER	Sebastián Aranda (on loan from (Peru) Sport Boys)
—	MF	GAM	Wally Fofana (from Daugavpils)
—	MF	LAT	Jevgeņijs Miņins (from Daugavpils)
—	MF	CIV	Youba Traoré (from (Ivory Coast) AFE Abidjan)
—	MF	FRA	Edvin Bongemba (from (France) Agde)
—	MF	NGR	Hussaini Ibrahim (from Riga)
—	MF	LAT	Ratmirs Trifonovs (from Riga Mariners)
—	MF	PAN	Ariel Arroyo (on loan from (Panama) Árabe Unido)
—	MF	LAT	Roberts Bočs (from (Italy) Pisa)
—	FW	SEN	Barthélemy Diedhiou (from Daugavpils)
—	FW	CIV	Mohamoud Fofana (from (Ivory Coast) JAC d'Angré)
—	FW	PAN	Josué Vergara (from (Panama) Tauro)
—	FW	FRA	Hénoc Lusweki (from (France) Racing Club)
—	FW	BFA	Ousmane Camara (from Riga, was on loan)
—	FW	SEN	Meleye Diagne (on loan from Riga)

Out: Note: Flags indicate national team as defined under FIFA eligibility rules; some limited exceptions apply. Players may hold more than one non-FIFA nationality.

No.	Pos.	Nation	Player
—	GK	LAT	Roberts Ozols (to (Albania) Bylis)
—	GK	LAT	Kristers Gabriels Bite (to (United States) Minnesota United FC 2)
—	DF	BRA	Paulo Eduardo (loan return to Riga)
—	DF	LAT	Jegors Novikovs (to Jelgava)
—	DF	ARG	Iván Erquiaga (to (Argentina) Instituto)
—	DF	CMR	Karl Gameni Wassom (to Riga)
—	DF	SEN	Arona Fall (to (Czech Republic) Dynamo)
—	DF	MLI	Abdoul Razak Touré (to Riga II)
—	MF	POR	Matheus Clemente (to RFS)
—	MF	FRA	Kemelho Nguena (to (Kosovo) Drita)
—	MF	BRA	Jackson (to (Georgia (country)) FC Rustavi)
—	MF	HAI	Jeudi Stevenson (to (Lithuania) TransINVEST)
—	MF	FRA	Abdoulaye Coulibaly (Released)
—	FW	BOL	Enzo Monteiro (loan return to (Brazil) Santos)
—	FW	CIV	Abdoul Kader Traoré (to Daugavpils)
—	FW	TAN	Omar Mvungi (Released)
—	FW	SRB	Andrej Bogićević (to Riga II)

=== Jelgava ===
In: Note: Flags indicate national team as defined under FIFA eligibility rules; some limited exceptions apply. Players may hold more than one non-FIFA nationality.

No.	Pos.	Nation	Player
—	GK	SVK	Samuel Belaník (from (Czech Republic) Zlín)
—	DF	LAT	Maksims Semeško (on loan from Riga II)
—	DF	LAT	Alans Kangars (from Liepāja)
—	DF	LAT	Jegors Novikovs (from Auda)
—	DF	LAT	Ivans Smirnovs (from Riga Mariners)
—	DF	LAT	Aleksandrs Butovskis (Free agent)
—	DF	LAT	Gļebs Kačanovs (from Riga Mariners)
—	DF	CZE	Leoš Prior (from (Czech Republic) Dukla B)
—	MF	LAT	Roberts Meļķis (from Liepāja)
—	MF	CZE	Miloš Pudil (from (Czech Republic) SK Slavia Prague)
—	MF	LAT	Gļebs Žaleiko (from RFS, was on loan)
—	MF	GAM	Muhammed Hydara (from (Slovakia) Pohronie)
—	MF	NGR	Promise Victor (loan return from Daugavpils)
—	MF	LAT	Andris Deklavs (from Super Nova)
—	FW	LAT	Kristofers Rēķis (from Metta/LU)
—	FW	CZE	Tomáš Rataj (from (Czech Republic) Opava)
—	FW	LAT	Gļebs Patika (on loan from (Slovakia) Tatran)

Out: Note: Flags indicate national team as defined under FIFA eligibility rules; some limited exceptions apply. Players may hold more than one non-FIFA nationality.

No.	Pos.	Nation	Player
—	DF	CZE	Ondřej Ullman (loan return to (Czech Republic) FK Dukla Prague)
—	DF	NGR	Yahaya Muhammad (loan return to (Czech Republic) Karviná)
—	DF	LAT	Roberts Veips (to RFS, was on loan)
—	DF	LAT	Kristers Penkevics (to (Czech Republic) FC Zlín)
—	DF	LAT	Valters Purs (to Super Nova)
—	DF	CZE	Andriy Yuzvak (on loan to (Poland) Znicz Pruszków)
—	DF	LAT	Kristers Aļekseičiks (on loan to (Czech Republic) Vítkovice)
—	DF	LAT	Mārcis Šusts (to Tukums 2000)
—	MF	LAT	Markuss Ivanovs (to Riga Mariners)
—	MF	GAM	Muhammed Hydara (on loan to (Estonia) Tammeka)
—	MF	LAT	Ēriks Boroduška (to (Finland) Atlantis FC)
—	MF	LAT	Daniils Kašica (Released)
—	MF	NGR	Promise Victor (on loan to Super Nova)
—	FW	LAT	Ruslans Deružinskis (to Tukums 2000)
—	FW	LAT	Kristofers Rēķis (on loan to (Czech Republic) Vítkovice)
—	FW	NGR	Kingsley Emenike (on loan to RFS)
—	FW	BRA	Ismael Campos (Released)

=== Tukums 2000 ===
In: Note: Flags indicate national team as defined under FIFA eligibility rules; some limited exceptions apply. Players may hold more than one non-FIFA nationality.

No.	Pos.	Nation	Player
—	GK	LAT	Ivans Baturins (from (Estonia) Harju)
—	DF	JPN	Sora Masuda (from (Spain) Real Oviedo Academy)
—	DF	LAT	Mārcis Šusts (from Jelgava)
—	DF	LAT	Kristaps Kļaviņš (from Super Nova)
—	DF	LAT	Rūdolfs Meļķis (on loan from Liepāja)
—	DF	UGA	Allan Enyou (from (Spain) Leganés B)
—	MF	BRA	Leoni Gastaldelo (from (Croatia) Vukovar 1991)
—	MF	JPN	Yushin Koki (on loan from (Japan) Ryukyu)
—	MF	JPN	Shun Shibata (from (Poland) Chojniczanka)
—	MF	LAT	Dāvis Cālbergs (from Jelgava II)
—	MF	LAT	Renē Baumanis (from Leevon PPK)
—	FW	LAT	Ruslans Deružinskis (from Jelgava)
—	FW	NGR	Joseph Oloko (on loan from Liepāja)

Out: Note: Flags indicate national team as defined under FIFA eligibility rules; some limited exceptions apply. Players may hold more than one non-FIFA nationality.

No.	Pos.	Nation	Player
—	GK	LAT	Raivo Stūriņš (loan return to Auda)
—	GK	LAT	Ņikita Parfjonovs (loan return to Liepāja)
—	GK	LAT	Kārlis Keziks (to Riga II)
—	DF	LAT	Oskars Vientiess (loan return to Liepāja)
—	DF	LAT	Maksims Semeško (loan return to Riga II)
—	DF	TUN	Maroine Mihoubi (to (Bulgaria) Vihren)
—	MF	JPN	Mikaze Nagasawa (loan return to RFS)
—	FW	CMR	Benato Bekima (loan return to Riga)
—	FW	LAT	Ingars Pūlis (loan return to Liepāja)
—	FW	JPN	Atsushi Kurokawa (loan return to (Japan) Machida Zelvia)
—	FW	UKR	Artem Holod (to Grobiņa)
—	FW	LAT	Niks Dusalijevs (on loan to RFS)

=== Super Nova ===
In: Note: Flags indicate national team as defined under FIFA eligibility rules; some limited exceptions apply. Players may hold more than one non-FIFA nationality.

No.	Pos.	Nation	Player
—	GK	LAT	Sergejs Vilkovs (on loan from RFS)
—	DF	LAT	Valters Purs (from Jelgava)
—	DF	LAT	Kristaps Romanovs (from Alberts)
—	DF	JPN	Rikuto Iida (on loan from (Japan) Kyoto Sanga)
—	DF	LAT	Kristaps Maksimovs (from Alberts)
—	DF	SEN	Ibrahima Ndiaye (from (United Arab Emirates) Elite Falcons)
—	MF	LAT	Ņikita Barkovskis (on loan from Daugavpils)
—	MF	ARG	Facundo García (on loan from RFS)
—	MF	NGR	Promise Victor (on loan from Jelgava)
—	MF	SEN	Sabaly Diallo (from (France) Le Havre B)
—	FW	LAT	Valerijs Lizunovs (on loan from RFS)
—	FW	JPN	Sho Aogaki (from Rēzekne)
—	FW	SEN	Amadou Samaté (from (Portugal) União de Santarém)
—	FW	ARM	Aram Bahdasaryan (from (Lithuania) Džiugas)
—	FW	SEN	Ndiaye Pathé (from (Spain) Leganés B)

Out: Note: Flags indicate national team as defined under FIFA eligibility rules; some limited exceptions apply. Players may hold more than one non-FIFA nationality.

No.	Pos.	Nation	Player
—	GK	LAT	Nils Toms Puriņš (loan return to Riga, later to Auda)
—	DF	LAT	Kristaps Kļaviņš (to Tukums 2000)
—	DF	LAT	Dāvis Vējkrīgers (to Ogre United)
—	DF	LAT	Rūdolfs Zeņģis (to Mārupe)
—	MF	LAT	Kristers Čudars (to Ogre United)
—	MF	JPN	Ryuga Nakamura (to (United States) Monterey Bay)
—	MF	LAT	Ralfs Maslovs (Released)
—	MF	LAT	Andris Deklavs (to Jelgava)
—	MF	LAT	Tomass Zants (to (Norway) Gjøvik-Lyn)
—	FW	UKR	Dmytro Sula (to (Georgia (country)) Odishi)
—	FW	LAT	Emīls Sprukts (to Ogre United)
—	FW	UKR	Artem Marchuk (to (Lithuania) Džiugas)

=== Grobiņa ===
In: Note: Flags indicate national team as defined under FIFA eligibility rules; some limited exceptions apply. Players may hold more than one non-FIFA nationality.

No.	Pos.	Nation	Player
—	GK	LAT	Vjačeslavs Kudrjavcevs (Free agent)
—	DF	LAT	Aleksandrs Molotkovs (on loan from Liepāja)
—	DF	LAT	Krišjānis Rupeiks (loan return from Karosta)
—	DF	LAT	Gustavs Leitāns (loan return from Karosta)
—	MF	NGR	Oladotun Olatunde-Matthew (from (Moldova) Milsami)
—	MF	LAT	Dans Sirbu (from Riga Mariners)
—	MF	JPN	Hirotaka Yamada (from (Lithuania) Džiugas)
—	MF	LAT	Ralfs Bethers (loan return from Karosta)
—	MF	UKR	Martin José (from (Slovenia) Domžale)
—	MF	UKR	Ivan Matiushenko (Free agent)
—	MF	LAT	Martins Raihs (from Liepāja II)
—	FW	UKR	Artem Holod (from Tukums 2000)
—	FW	CAN	Ali Aruna (from (Bulgaria) Septemvri)

Out: Note: Flags indicate national team as defined under FIFA eligibility rules; some limited exceptions apply. Players may hold more than one non-FIFA nationality.

No.	Pos.	Nation	Player
—	GK	LAT	Frenks Orols (loan return to RFS)
—	DF	SEN	Boris Tchamba (to (Syria) Al-Karamah SC)
—	DF	LAT	Ralfs Džeriņš (Released)
—	DF	BEL	Pie-Luxton Bekili (Released)
—	DF	FRA	Lucas Kouao (Released)
—	MF	LAT	Tomašs Mickēvičs (loan return to Riga II)
—	MF	LAT	Aleksejs Grjaznovs (Released)
—	MF	SEN	Pape Doudou (to Valmiera)
—	MF	UKR	Stanislav Morarenko (to (Lithuania) DFK Dainava)
—	FW	LAT	Rodrigo Gaučis (loan return to RFS)
—	FW	LAT	Emīls Knapšis (to (Germany) Grün-Weiß Siemerode)
—	FW	UKR	Mykola Ahapov (to (Kyrgyzstan) Asia)

=== Ogre United ===
In: Note: Flags indicate national team as defined under FIFA eligibility rules; some limited exceptions apply. Players may hold more than one non-FIFA nationality.

No.	Pos.	Nation	Player
—	GK	LAT	Ņikita Parfjonovs (on loan from Liepāja)
—	GK	LAT	Kristers Jānis Biščuhis (from Alberts, was on loan)
—	DF	LAT	Dāvis Vējkrīgers (from Super Nova)
—	DF	LAT	Mārtiņš Lormanis (Free agent)
—	DF	UKR	Matvii Marusii (from Alberts)
—	MF	LAT	Tomašs Mickēvičs (on loan from Riga II)
—	MF	LAT	Kristers Čudars (from Super Nova)
—	MF	LAT	Dāvis Sedols (from RFS II)
—	MF	LAT	Roberts Adītājs (from Alberts)
—	MF	LAT	Markuss Ivulāns (on loan from Liepāja)
—	FW	LAT	Emīls Sprukts (from Super Nova)
—	FW	BRA	Felipe Machado (from (Korea) Chuncheon)
—	FW	LAT	Emīls Evelons (on loan from Metta)
—	FW	UGA	Johnson Kabagambe (on loan from Riga II)

Out: Note: Flags indicate national team as defined under FIFA eligibility rules; some limited exceptions apply. Players may hold more than one non-FIFA nationality.

No.	Pos.	Nation	Player
—	GK	LAT	Dmitrijs Grigorjevs (released)
—	GK	LAT	Endijs Miervaldis Pērkons (to Union/Daugava)
—	DF	UKR	Dmytro Mamich (to (Georgia (country)) Odishi 1919)
—	DF	LAT	Mārtiņš Ēriks Veckāgans (Released)
—	MF	LAT	Krišs Kārkliņš (to Riga Mariners)
—	MF	LAT	Kristians Sprukulis (to Mārupe)
—	MF	LAT	Vladimirs Stepanovs (to Valmiera)
—	MF	LAT	Daniils Hvoiņickis (Released)
—	MF	LAT	Daniels Saliņš (to Union/Daugava)
—	MF	LAT	Rihards Juhnovičs (to Union/Daugava)
—	FW	LAT	Kristofers Jamonts (Released)

== Latvian First League ==
=== Metta ===
In: Note: Flags indicate national team as defined under FIFA eligibility rules; some limited exceptions apply. Players may hold more than one non-FIFA nationality.

No.	Pos.	Nation	Player
—	GK	LAT	Toms Tolmanis (from Skanste)
—	DF	GHA	Yusif Yakubu (loan return from (Estonia) Harju)
—	DF	LAT	Oskars Likas (from Skanste)
—	DF	LAT	Rendijs Šibass (from RFS)
—	DF	GAM	Sellou Jallow (from (The Gambia) Medina United FA)
—	DF	LAT	Daniels Dans Pētersons (from Skanste)
—	MF	NGR	Waris Olamilekan Lawal (from Skanste)
—	MF	NGR	Abdulraheem Suleiman (from (Nigeria) Sporting Lagos)
—	FW	LAT	Olivers Dzenītis (from Skanste)
—	FW	NGR	Kehinde Abdulraheem (from (Nigeria) VOE Academy)
—	FW	NGR	Taiwo Abdulraheem (from (Nigeria) VOE Academy)
—	FW	GHA	Prince Appiah Amoah (from Skanste)

Out: Note: Flags indicate national team as defined under FIFA eligibility rules; some limited exceptions apply. Players may hold more than one non-FIFA nationality.

No.	Pos.	Nation	Player
—	GK	LAT	Alvis Sorokins (on loan to Liepāja)
—	DF	LAT	Alans Kangars (loan return to Liepāja)
—	DF	LAT	Aleksandrs Molotkovs (loan return to Liepāja)
—	DF	ITA	Gianluca Scremin (Released)
—	DF	BRA	Lauan (to (Brazil) Azuriz)
—	MF	SLE	Mohamed Bai Kamara (Released)
—	MF	SLE	Saymah Kamara (Released)
—	MF	LAT	Markuss Ivulāns (to Liepāja)
—	MF	SLE	Abdul Bangura (to (United Arab Emirates) Al Hamriyah)
—	MF	LAT	Ardis Ābeļkalns (to Skanste)
—	FW	LAT	Kristofers Rēķis (to FS Jelgava)
—	FW	LAT	Emīls Evelons (on loan to Ogre United)
—	FW	NGR	Taiwo Abdulraheem (to Skanste)

=== Alberts ===
In: Note: Flags indicate national team as defined under FIFA eligibility rules; some limited exceptions apply. Players may hold more than one non-FIFA nationality.

No.	Pos.	Nation	Player
—	GK	LAT	Andrejs Karpekins (from Dinamo)
—	DF	LAT	Klāvs Kramēns (from (Faroe Islands) Havnar Bóltfelag)
—	MF	LAT	Martins Bokta (from Smiltene)

Out: Note: Flags indicate national team as defined under FIFA eligibility rules; some limited exceptions apply. Players may hold more than one non-FIFA nationality.

No.	Pos.	Nation	Player
—	GK	LAT	Kristers Jānis Biščuhis (to Ogre United, was on loan)
—	DF	LAT	Kristaps Romanovs (to Super Nova)
—	DF	LAT	Kristaps Maksimovs (to Super Nova)
—	DF	UKR	Matvii Marusii (to Ogre United)
—	DF	LAT	Fabio Sebastians Rošā (to Super Nova II)
—	MF	LAT	Ričards Penka (to Mārupe)
—	MF	LAT	Roberts Adītājs (to Ogre United)
—	MF	LAT	Dāvids Ralfs Zāģeris (to Super Nova II)
—	FW	SLE	Suffian Kalokoh (Released)

=== Riga Mariners ===
In: Note: Flags indicate national team as defined under FIFA eligibility rules; some limited exceptions apply. Players may hold more than one non-FIFA nationality.

No.	Pos.	Nation	Player
—	GK	LAT	Žans Romanovs (from Riga II)
—	DF	LAT	Elvis Stuglis (from RFS)
—	DF	GEO	Giorgi Gvasalia (from (Georgia (country)) Merani Tbilisi)
—	DF	LAT	Ralfs Muižnieks (from Riga II)
—	DF	LAT	Artemijs Deņisovs (from Rīgas FS)
—	MF	LAT	Krišs Kārkliņš (from Ogre United)
—	MF	LAT	Markuss Ivanovs (from Jelgava)
—	MF	GHA	Richmond Owusu (from Valmiera)
—	MF	LAT	Aleksandrs Sebastians Svaričevskis (from Riga Academy)
—	FW	LAT	Deniss Avdejevs (from Riga II)
—	FW	LAT	Edgars Pavļenko (from Olaine)

Out: Note: Flags indicate national team as defined under FIFA eligibility rules; some limited exceptions apply. Players may hold more than one non-FIFA nationality.

No.	Pos.	Nation	Player
—	DF	LAT	Gļebs Kačanovs (to Jelgava)
—	DF	LAT	Ivans Smirnovs (to Jelgava)
—	MF	LAT	Dans Sirbu (to Grobiņa)
—	MF	LAT	Ratmirs Trifonovs (to Auda)
—	FW	LAT	Arturs Krancmanis (to (Italy) Budoni)

=== JFK Ventspils ===
In: Note: Flags indicate national team as defined under FIFA eligibility rules; some limited exceptions apply. Players may hold more than one non-FIFA nationality.

No.	Pos.	Nation	Player
—	DF	LAT	Patriks Toms Brūns (on loan from Liepāja II)
—	MF	LAT	Kasiuss Kosovs (on loan from Liepāja II)
—	MF	ITA	Manrico Messina (from (Italy) United Riccione)
—	MF	FIN	Kirill Bullat (Free agent)
—	FW	LAT	Jegors Poskrjobiševs (from Riga II)

Out: Note: Flags indicate national team as defined under FIFA eligibility rules; some limited exceptions apply. Players may hold more than one non-FIFA nationality.

No.	Pos.	Nation	Player
—	MF	TOG	Pierre Hounlete (to (Georgia (country)) Gareji)
—	MF	NGR	Adamu Aliyu (Released)
—	MF	MLI	Mahamadou Dembélé (to Valmiera)
—	MF	FRA	Yasin Essennouni (Released)
—	FW	LAT	Ņikita Solomonovs (to (Italy) Venezia U19)
—	FW	LAT	Kaspars Svārups (Released)
—	FW	NGR	Augustine Okeke (Released)

=== RFS-2 ===
In: Note: Flags indicate national team as defined under FIFA eligibility rules; some limited exceptions apply. Players may hold more than one non-FIFA nationality.

No.	Pos.	Nation	Player
—	MF	LAT	Ivans Galajevs (from Riga II)

Out: Note: Flags indicate national team as defined under FIFA eligibility rules; some limited exceptions apply. Players may hold more than one non-FIFA nationality.

No.	Pos.	Nation	Player
—	DF	LAT	Kristiāns Ilenāns (to Leevon PPK)
—	DF	LAT	Maksims Sarapulovs (to Super Nova II)
—	MF	LAT	Patriks Putniņš (to Leevon PPK)
—	MF	LAT	Dāvis Sedols (to Ogre United)

=== Skanste ===
In: Note: Flags indicate national team as defined under FIFA eligibility rules; some limited exceptions apply. Players may hold more than one non-FIFA nationality.

No.	Pos.	Nation	Player
—	DF	GHA	Mohammed Lampty (from (Ghana) Žilina Africa)
—	MF	LAT	Ardis Ābeļkalns (from Metta)
—	FW	GHA	Prince Appiah Amoah (from (Ghana) Žilina Africa)
—	FW	NGR	Taiwo Abdulraheem (from Metta)

Out: Note: Flags indicate national team as defined under FIFA eligibility rules; some limited exceptions apply. Players may hold more than one non-FIFA nationality.

No.	Pos.	Nation	Player
—	GK	LAT	Toms Tolmanis (to Metta)
—	DF	LAT	Pēteris Palameiks (to Leevon PPK)
—	DF	LAT	Oskars Likas (to Metta)
—	MF	LAT	Olivers Kellers (to Leevon PPK)
—	MF	LAT	Daniels Dans Pētersons (to Metta)
—	MF	NGR	Waris Olamilekan Lawal (to Metta)
—	MF	ITA	Edoardo Acampora (to (Italy) Brian Lignano U19)
—	FW	LAT	Olivers Dzenītis (to Metta)
—	FW	GHA	Prince Appiah Amoah (to Metta)

=== Leevon PPK ===
In: Note: Flags indicate national team as defined under FIFA eligibility rules; some limited exceptions apply. Players may hold more than one non-FIFA nationality.

No.	Pos.	Nation	Player
—	DF	LAT	Pēteris Palameiks (from Skanste)
—	DF	LAT	Kristiāns Ilenāns (from RFS II)
—	DF	NGR	Jeremiah Paul (from (Estonia) Welco)
—	MF	LAT	Olivers Kellers (from Skanste)
—	MF	LAT	Patriks Putniņš (from RFS II)
—	MF	JPN	Sho Saito (from (Armenia) Bentonit)
—	MF	UKR	Yevhenii Kholmetskyi (Free agent)
—	FW	LAT	Marks Kurtišs (from Upesciema Warriors)
—	FW	LAT	Ričards Korzāns (from Mārupe)

Out: Note: Flags indicate national team as defined under FIFA eligibility rules; some limited exceptions apply. Players may hold more than one non-FIFA nationality.

No.	Pos.	Nation	Player
—	DF	LAT	Ilmārs Labuds (Retired)
—	DF	LAT	Roberts Čevers (to Mārupe)
—	MF	LAT	Ričards Ulmis (Released)
—	MF	LAT	Renē Baumanis (to Tukums 2000)
—	FW	LAT	Artis Jaudzems (Released)

=== Mārupe ===
In: Note: Flags indicate national team as defined under FIFA eligibility rules; some limited exceptions apply. Players may hold more than one non-FIFA nationality.

No.	Pos.	Nation	Player
—	DF	LAT	Kristaps Strupišs (from Olaine)
—	DF	LAT	Roberts Čevers (from Leevon PPK)
—	DF	LAT	Rūdolfs Zeņģis (from Super Nova)
—	MF	LAT	Krists Komorovskis (from Super Nova, was on loan)
—	MF	LAT	Ričards Penka (from Alberts)
—	MF	LAT	Kristians Sprukulis (from Ogre United)
—	MF	LAT	Klāvs Grosbergs (from Smiltene)
—	MF	LAT	Alekss Bogdanovs (from Skanste Youth)
—	FW	LAT	Gustavs Krieviņš (from Rīgas futbola skola)
—	FW	ARM	Arame Minasyan (from (Spain) Sant Andreu Academy)
—	FW	LAT	Kristaps Žodziņš (from Kadaga/Osta)

Out: Note: Flags indicate national team as defined under FIFA eligibility rules; some limited exceptions apply. Players may hold more than one non-FIFA nationality.

No.	Pos.	Nation	Player
—	DF	LAT	Roberts Hons (Released)
—	DF	LAT	Tomass Zāgs (Released)
—	FW	LAT	Ričards Korzāns (to Leevon PPK)
—	FW	UKR	Maksym Sula (Released)

=== Rēzekne ===
In: Note: Flags indicate national team as defined under FIFA eligibility rules; some limited exceptions apply. Players may hold more than one non-FIFA nationality.

No.	Pos.	Nation	Player
—	DF	LAT	Maksims Aleksejevs (from Daugavpils II)
—	DF	CMR	Ulrich Kamga Souop (from (Cameroon) Royal Foumban)
—	MF	LAT	Andrejs Kovaļovs (from Augšdaugava)
—	MF	LAT	Rainers Buks (from Augšdaugava)
—	MF	LAT	Maksims Bērziņš (from Daugavpils II)
—	MF	CMR	Abdel Mfonka (from (Cameroon) Royal Foumban)
—	MF	NGR	Abdulrazak Shehu (from (Nigeria) Simoiben)
—	MF	NGR	Michael Tunde (from (Nigeria) Simoiben)

Out: Note: Flags indicate national team as defined under FIFA eligibility rules; some limited exceptions apply. Players may hold more than one non-FIFA nationality.

No.	Pos.	Nation	Player
—	MF	GHA	Ibrahim Rahman (Released)
—	FW	JPN	Sho Aogaki (to Super Nova)
—	FW	FRA	Aly Sako (Released)

=== Smiltene ===
In: Note: Flags indicate national team as defined under FIFA eligibility rules; some limited exceptions apply. Players may hold more than one non-FIFA nationality.

No.	Pos.	Nation	Player
—	DF	FRA	Arnaud Fezui (Free agent)
—	MF	LAT	Kristers Aldis Puriņš (Free agent)
—	MF	LAT	Ritvars Krists Zauska (from Valmiera, was on loan)
—	MF	LAT	Artūrs Bērziņš (from (Netherlands) Rood-Wit '62)
—	MF	LAT	Emīls Dūmiņš (from Valmiera)
—	FW	EGY	Bilal Attia (from (Egypt) Petrojet)
—	FW	LAT	Rūdolfs Laķis (on loan from Jelgava II)
—	FW	LAT	Rihards Vītols (from Gauja)

Out: Note: Flags indicate national team as defined under FIFA eligibility rules; some limited exceptions apply. Players may hold more than one non-FIFA nationality.

No.	Pos.	Nation	Player
—	DF	LAT	Madis Oskars Miķelsons (Released)
—	MF	LAT	Ēriks Maurs-Boks (loan return to Valmiera, later to Riga II)
—	MF	LAT	Klāvs Grosbergs (to Mārupe)
—	MF	LAT	Martins Bokta (to Alberts)
—	MF	LAT	Artūrs Bērziņš (to Valmiera)

=== Riga-2 ===
In: Note: Flags indicate national team as defined under FIFA eligibility rules; some limited exceptions apply. Players may hold more than one non-FIFA nationality.

No.	Pos.	Nation	Player
—	GK	LAT	Žans Romanovs (loan return from Olaine)
—	GK	LAT	Kārlis Keziks (from Tukums 2000)
—	GK	LAT	Igors Antipenkovs (from Olaine)
—	DF	LAT	Maksims Semeško (loan return from Tukums 2000)
—	DF	MLI	Abdoul Razak Touré (from Auda)
—	DF	CIV	Abou Sylla (Free agent)
—	MF	LAT	Tomašs Mickēvičs (loan return from Grobiņa)
—	MF	LAT	Ēriks Maurs-Boks (from Valmiera, previously on loan at Smiltene)
—	MF	TAN	Abdu Omari Mandeke (from (Nigeria) Grassrunners)
—	MF	LAT	Enriko Gauračs (from (Italy) Modena U19)
—	FW	LAT	Nils Voitiškis (from Jelgava II)
—	FW	SRB	Andrej Bogićević (from Auda)

Out: Note: Flags indicate national team as defined under FIFA eligibility rules; some limited exceptions apply. Players may hold more than one non-FIFA nationality.

No.	Pos.	Nation	Player
—	GK	LAT	Žans Romanovs (to Riga Mariners)
—	DF	LAT	Maksims Semeško (on loan to Jelgava)
—	DF	LAT	Ralfs Muižnieks (to Riga Mariners)
—	DF	LAT	Ņikita Fedosejevs (Released)
—	MF	LAT	Tomašs Mickēvičs (on loan to Ogre United)
—	MF	LAT	Ivans Galajevs (to RFS II)
—	FW	UKR	Maksym Parkhomenko (to (Croatia) Graničar Đurđevac)
—	FW	LAT	Deniss Avdejevs (to Riga Mariners)
—	FW	UGA	Johnson Kabagambe (on loan to Ogre United)
—	FW	LAT	Jegors Poskrjobiševs (to Ventspils)

=== Tukums 2000-2 ===
In: Note: Flags indicate national team as defined under FIFA eligibility rules; some limited exceptions apply. Players may hold more than one non-FIFA nationality.

No.	Pos.	Nation	Player

Out: Note: Flags indicate national team as defined under FIFA eligibility rules; some limited exceptions apply. Players may hold more than one non-FIFA nationality.

No.	Pos.	Nation	Player

=== Valmiera ===
In: Note: Flags indicate national team as defined under FIFA eligibility rules; some limited exceptions apply. Players may hold more than one non-FIFA nationality.

No.	Pos.	Nation	Player
—	GK	LAT	Anzors Kvančiani (Free agent)
—	DF	FRA	Lenny Manisa (from (Georgia (country)) Dila)
—	MF	LAT	Vladimirs Stepanovs (from Ogre United)
—	MF	TUN	Fraj Kayramani (from (Tunisia) Kairouan)
—	MF	SEN	Pape Doudou (from Grobiņa)
—	MF	MLI	Mahamadou Dembélé (from Ventspils)
—	MF	JPN	Wataru Abe (from (Lithuania) Arawore)
—	MF	LAT	Adrians Baņņikovs (from Spēks)
—	MF	LAT	Jēkabs Vagars (from Spēks)
—	MF	LAT	Artūrs Bērziņš (from Smiltene)
—	FW	BRA	Gleilson Lopes (from Spēks)

Out: Note: Flags indicate national team as defined under FIFA eligibility rules; some limited exceptions apply. Players may hold more than one non-FIFA nationality.

No.	Pos.	Nation	Player
—	DF	NGR	Daniel Adelakun (to (Czech Republic) Slovan Velvary)
—	MF	GHA	Richmond Owusu (to Riga Mariners)
—	MF	LAT	Ritvars Krists Zauska (to Smiltene, was on loan)
—	MF	JPN	Yusuke Omori (to (Lithuania) Sūduva)
—	MF	LAT	Emīls Dūmiņš (to Smiltene)
—	FW	LAT	Oskars Stupelis (to Super Nova II)
—	FW	LAT	Niks Savaļnieks (Released)

=== Super Nova-2 ===
In: Note: Flags indicate national team as defined under FIFA eligibility rules; some limited exceptions apply. Players may hold more than one non-FIFA nationality.

No.	Pos.	Nation	Player
—	GK	LAT	Viesturs Pipcāns (from Balvi)
—	DF	LAT	Maksims Sarapulovs (from RFS II)
—	DF	LAT	Fabio Sebastians Rošā (from Alberts)
—	MF	LAT	Dāvids Ralfs Zāģeris (from Alberts)
—	MF	LAT	Ansis Vītiņš (from Rīgas FS)
—	FW	LAT	Iļja Streļcovs (from Olaine)
—	FW	LAT	Oskars Stupelis (from Valmiera)
—	FW	LAT	Jēkabs Vītiņš (from Rīgas FS)

Out: Note: Flags indicate national team as defined under FIFA eligibility rules; some limited exceptions apply. Players may hold more than one non-FIFA nationality.

No.	Pos.	Nation	Player
