= List of Latvian football transfers summer 2025 =

This is a list of Latvian football transfers in the summer transfer window 2025 by club. Only clubs of the 2025 Latvian Higher League are included.

== Latvian Higher League ==
=== RFS ===
In: Note: Flags indicate national team as defined under FIFA eligibility rules; some limited exceptions apply. Players may hold more than one non-FIFA nationality.

No.	Pos.	Nation	Player
—	GK	CRO	Marko Marič (from (Bosnia and Herzegovina) Zrinjski)
—	GK	LVA	Frenks Orols (loan return from Super Nova)
—	DF	LVA	Roberts Veips (on loan from Jelgava)
—	DF	SRB	Aleksandar Filipovic (from (Serbia) Partizan)
—	MF	ARG	Facundo García (from (Cyprus) Omonia 29M)
—	MF	LVA	Roberts Meļķis (on loan from Liepāja)
—	MF	SRB	Strahinja Rakić (from (Serbia) Jedinstvo Ub)
—	MF	LVA	Jevgēņijs Miņins (loan return from Super Nova, later loaned to BFC Daugavpils)
—	MF	NGA	Promise Victor (from Jelgava)
—	FW	LVA	Dāvis Ikaunieks (from (Brunei) DPMM)
—	FW	NED	Tayrell Wouter (from (Cyprus) Apollon Limassol)
—	FW	LVA	Ruslans Deružinskis (loan return from Super Nova, later on loan to Jelgava)
—	FW	SEN	Barthélémy Diedhiou (on loan from BFC Daugavpils)
—	FW	BFA	Fayçal Konaté (loan return from Daugavpils)
—	FW	CIV	Mamadou Sylla (loan return from Super Nova)

Out: Note: Flags indicate national team as defined under FIFA eligibility rules; some limited exceptions apply. Players may hold more than one non-FIFA nationality.

No.	Pos.	Nation	Player
—	GK	CMR	Fabrice Ondoa (Released)
—	GK	LVA	Frenks Orols (on loan to Grobiņas SC/LFS)
—	MF	GAM	Modou Saidy (on loan to BFC Daugavpils)
—	MF	LVA	Gļebs Žaleiko (to Jelgava)
—	MF	LVA	Jevgēņijs Miņins (on loan to BFC Daugavpils)
—	MF	NGA	Promise Victor (on loan to BFC Daugavpils)
—	MF	JPN	Mikaze Nagasawa (on loan to Tukums 2000)
—	MF	JPN	Yukiyoshi Karashima (on loan to (Finland) HJK Helsinki)
—	FW	LVA	Ruslans Deružinskis (on loan to Jelgava)

=== Riga ===
In: Note: Flags indicate national team as defined under FIFA eligibility rules; some limited exceptions apply. Players may hold more than one non-FIFA nationality.

No.	Pos.	Nation	Player
—	DF	LVA	Emīls Birka (from Auda)
—	DF	CMR	Karl Gameni Wassom (loan return from Auda)
—	MF	CRC	Orlando Galo (from (Costa Rica) Herediano, was on loan)
—	MF	LVA	Renārs Varslavāns (from Auda)

Out: Note: Flags indicate national team as defined under FIFA eligibility rules; some limited exceptions apply. Players may hold more than one non-FIFA nationality.

No.	Pos.	Nation	Player
—	GK	LVA	Nils Toms Puriņš (on loan to Super Nova)
—	DF	ARG	Iván Erquiaga (to Auda)
—	DF	BRA	Paulo Eduardo (on loan to Auda)
—	MF	CRO	Hrvoje Babec (to (Croatia) Osijek, was on loan)
—	MF	BRA	Jackson (to Auda)
—	FW	LVA	Eduards Dašķevičs (on loan to Auda)
—	FW	NGA	Abdulrahman Taiwo (on loan to (Slovakia) Spartak Trnava)

=== Auda ===
In: Note: Flags indicate national team as defined under FIFA eligibility rules; some limited exceptions apply. Players may hold more than one non-FIFA nationality.

No.	Pos.	Nation	Player
—	GK	LVA	Kristers Gabriels Bite (loan return from Metta/LU)
—	DF	ARG	Iván Erquiaga (from Riga)
—	DF	BRA	Paulo Eduardo (on loan from Riga)
—	MF	SUR	Jayen Gerold (from (Netherlands) Jong AZ)
—	MF	FRA	Abdoulaye Coulibaly (from (Switzerland) Biel-Bienne)
—	MF	LVA	Arturs Krancmanis (loan return from Tukums 2000)
—	MF	BRA	Jackson (from Riga)
—	FW	SRB	Andrej Bogićević (from (Serbia) Grafičar)
—	FW	LVA	Eduards Dašķevičs (on loan from Riga)
—	FW	TAN	Omar Mvungi (from (France) Nantes B)

Out: Note: Flags indicate national team as defined under FIFA eligibility rules; some limited exceptions apply. Players may hold more than one non-FIFA nationality.

No.	Pos.	Nation	Player
—	GK	LVA	Rihards Matrevics (to (Czech Republic) FK Dukla Prague)
—	DF	LVA	Emīls Birka (to Riga)
—	DF	CMR	Karl Gameni Wassom (loan return to Riga)
—	DF	BRA	Rafael Pontelo (loan return to (Portugal) Sporting B)
—	MF	NGA	Abiodun Ogunniyi (to Liepāja)
—	MF	LVA	Arturs Krancmanis (to Riga Mariners)
—	MF	LVA	Renārs Varslavāns (to Riga)
—	MF	GUI	Mamadou Kané (to (Cyprus) Ethnikos)

=== Daugavpils ===
In: Note: Flags indicate national team as defined under FIFA eligibility rules; some limited exceptions apply. Players may hold more than one non-FIFA nationality.

No.	Pos.	Nation	Player
—	MF	GAM	Modou Saidy (on loan from RFS)
—	MF	NGA	Promise Victor (on loan from RFS)
—	MF	LVA	Jevgēņijs Miņins (on loan from RFS)
—	MF	NGA	Kumater Shina (from (Nigeria) Final Touch FA)
—	MF	LVA	Ervīns Piņaskins (loan return from Augšdaugava)
—	FW	BFA	Fayçal Konaté (on loan from RFS)

Out: Note: Flags indicate national team as defined under FIFA eligibility rules; some limited exceptions apply. Players may hold more than one non-FIFA nationality.

No.	Pos.	Nation	Player
—	GK	LVA	Lukass Žuravļovs (to (Portugal) Naval 1893)
—	MF	LVA	Armans Galajs (to Rēzekne)
—	MF	CIV	Toumani Diakite (to (Czech Republic) Slovan Liberec)
—	FW	SEN	Barthélémy Diedhiou (on loan to RFS)
—	FW	LVA	Marks Pačepko (loan return to Liepāja)
—	FW	BFA	Fayçal Konaté (loan return to RFS)
—	FW	LVA	Kristiāns Kaušelis (to (Poland) Ślęza)
—	FW	MLI	Boubou Diallo (to (Czech Republic) Dukla)

=== Liepāja ===
In: Note: Flags indicate national team as defined under FIFA eligibility rules; some limited exceptions apply. Players may hold more than one non-FIFA nationality.

No.	Pos.	Nation	Player
—	GK	LVA	Ņikita Parfjonovs (from Metta/LU)
—	DF	UKR	Oleksandr Chernozub (loan return from (Lithuania) Džiugas)
—	DF	LVA	Iļja Korotkovs (Free Agent)
—	DF	LTU	Edvinas Girdvainis (from (Germany) SV Sandhausen)
—	DF	POR	Amílcar Silva (from (France) Sochaux)
—	MF	LVA	Aleksejs Saveļjevs (from (Romania) Gloria Buzău)
—	MF	NGA	Abiodun Ogunniyi (from Auda)
—	FW	LVA	Artūrs Karašausks (loan return from (Cambodia) Visakha)
—	FW	LVA	Ingars Pūlis (from Tukums 2000)

Out: Note: Flags indicate national team as defined under FIFA eligibility rules; some limited exceptions apply. Players may hold more than one non-FIFA nationality.

No.	Pos.	Nation	Player
—	GK	LVA	Ņikita Parfjonovs (on loan to Tukums 2000)
—	DF	UKR	Oleksandr Chernozub (to (Bulgaria) Fratria)
—	DF	LVA	Rūdolfs Ziemelis (to Ogre United)
—	DF	LVA	Oskars Vientiess (on loan to Tukums 2000)
—	MF	LVA	Roberts Meļķis (on loan to RFS)
—	MF	SRB	Stefan Purtić (to (Serbia) Loznica)
—	FW	SEN	Pape Doudou (to Grobiņas SC/LFS)
—	FW	CRO	Niko Domjanić (loan return to (Croatia) Varaždin)
—	FW	LVA	Ingars Pūlis (on loan to Tukums 2000)
—	FW	LVA	Marks Pačepko (on loan to Ogre United)

=== Metta ===
In: Note: Flags indicate national team as defined under FIFA eligibility rules; some limited exceptions apply. Players may hold more than one non-FIFA nationality.

No.	Pos.	Nation	Player

Out: Note: Flags indicate national team as defined under FIFA eligibility rules; some limited exceptions apply. Players may hold more than one non-FIFA nationality.

No.	Pos.	Nation	Player
—	GK	LVA	Kristers Gabriels Bite (loan return to Auda)
—	GK	LVA	Ņikita Parfjonovs (to Liepāja)
—	DF	LVA	Lenards Bērziņš (to Super Nova)
—	MF	LVA	Kristaps Grabovskis (to (Denmark) B.93)
—	MF	LVA	Lūkass Vapne (to (Norway) Sogndal, was on loan)
—	MF	GHA	Mahamud Karimu (to (Estonia) Harju)

=== Tukums 2000 ===
In: Note: Flags indicate national team as defined under FIFA eligibility rules; some limited exceptions apply. Players may hold more than one non-FIFA nationality.

No.	Pos.	Nation	Player
—	GK	LVA	Ņikita Parfjonovs (on loan from Liepāja)
—	GK	LVA	Kārlis Keziks (from Olaine)
—	DF	LVA	Oskars Vientiess (on loan from Liepāja)
—	MF	JPN	Jun Toba (from (Romania) Focșani)
—	MF	JPN	Mikaze Nagasawa (on loan from RFS)
—	FW	LVA	Ingars Pūlis (on loan from Liepāja)
—	FW	UKR	Maksym Derkach (on loan from RFS II)
—	FW	JPN	Atsushi Kurokawa (on loan from (Japan) Machida Zelvia)

Out: Note: Flags indicate national team as defined under FIFA eligibility rules; some limited exceptions apply. Players may hold more than one non-FIFA nationality.

No.	Pos.	Nation	Player
—	GK	LVA	Vladislavs Kapustins (Released)
—	DF	LVA	Gļebs Kačanovs (to Riga Mariners)
—	DF	LVA	Deņiss Rogovs (to Riga Mariners)
—	MF	LVA	Arturs Krancmanis (loan return to Auda)
—	MF	LVA	Dans Sirbu (to Riga Mariners)
—	FW	LVA	Ingars Pūlis (to Liepāja)
—	FW	CMR	Benato Bekima (to (Lithuania) Nevėžis)

=== Grobiņa ===
In: Note: Flags indicate national team as defined under FIFA eligibility rules; some limited exceptions apply. Players may hold more than one non-FIFA nationality.

No.	Pos.	Nation	Player
—	GK	LVA	Frenks Orols (on loan from RFS)
—	DF	LTU	Rolandas Baravykas (Free Agent)
—	MF	LVA	Aleksejs Grjaznovs (from (Serbia) Dubočica)
—	MF	UKR	Stanislav Morarenko (from (Ukraine) Dinaz Vyshhorod)
—	FW	SEN	Pape Doudou (from Liepāja)
—	FW	LVA	Artjoms Puzirevskis (from (Italy) Nuova Sondrio)
—	FW	UKR	Mykola Ahapov (Free Agent)

Out: Note: Flags indicate national team as defined under FIFA eligibility rules; some limited exceptions apply. Players may hold more than one non-FIFA nationality.

No.	Pos.	Nation	Player
—	GK	LVA	Vladislavs Lazarevs (Released)
—	DF	LVA	Krišjānis Rupeiks (on loan to Karosta)
—	DF	LVA	Gustavs Leitāns (on loan to Karosta)
—	MF	ITA	Zakaria Sdaigui (to (Italy) Antella'99)
—	MF	NED	Gijs Steinfelder (to (Netherlands) De Treffers)
—	MF	LVA	Ralfs Bethers (on loan to Karosta)
—	FW	IRN	Arwin Kalmarzy (Released)

=== Super Nova ===
In: Note: Flags indicate national team as defined under FIFA eligibility rules; some limited exceptions apply. Players may hold more than one non-FIFA nationality.

No.	Pos.	Nation	Player
—	GK	LVA	Nils Toms Puriņš (on loan from Riga)
—	DF	LVA	Lenards Bērziņš (from Metta/LU)
—	DF	LVA	Ralfs Maslovs (from (Poland) Podbeskidzie Bielsko-Biała)
—	DF	LVA	Mikus Vasiļevskis (Free Agent)
—	FW	LVA	Emīls Sprukts (from (Belgium) Mechelen Academy)
—	FW	UKR	Artem Marchuk (from (Uzbekistan) Zaamin)

Out: Note: Flags indicate national team as defined under FIFA eligibility rules; some limited exceptions apply. Players may hold more than one non-FIFA nationality.

No.	Pos.	Nation	Player
—	GK	LVA	Frenks Orols (loan return to RFS)
—	DF	SEN	Hamidou Kante (on loan to (Czech Republic) SK Artis Brno)
—	DF	LVA	Kristaps Strupišs (to Olaine)
—	DF	SEN	Mouhamed Dione (to (Serbia) Dinamo Jug)
—	MF	SEN	Abdoulaye Gueye (to (Slovakia) DAC Dunajská Streda)
—	MF	LVA	Kirils Artjomovs (to Olaine)
—	MF	LVA	Krists Komorovskis (to Mārupe)
—	MF	LVA	Jevgēņijs Miņins (loan return to RFS)
—	MF	LVA	Vladimirs Stepanovs (to Ogre United)
—	FW	LVA	Ruslans Deružinskis (loan return to RFS-2)
—	FW	CIV	Mamadou Sylla (loan return to RFS)

=== Jelgava ===
In: Note: Flags indicate national team as defined under FIFA eligibility rules; some limited exceptions apply. Players may hold more than one non-FIFA nationality.

No.	Pos.	Nation	Player
—	MF	CZE	Filip Hašek (from (Czech Republic) FK Neratovice–Byškovice)
—	MF	CZE	Marek Polašek (from (Czech Republic) SK Artis Brno)
—	MF	CZE	Martin Hašek (Free agent)
—	MF	LVA	Gļebs Žaleiko (from RFS)
—	FW	LVA	Ruslans Deružinskis (on loan from RFS)

Out: Note: Flags indicate national team as defined under FIFA eligibility rules; some limited exceptions apply. Players may hold more than one non-FIFA nationality.

No.	Pos.	Nation	Player
—	DF	LVA	Roberts Veips (on loan to RFS)
—	DF	LVA	Andris Liepnieks (to Olaine)
—	DF	NGA	Yahaya Muhammad (loan return to (Czech Republic) Karviná, later on loan to (Czech Republic) Vysočina)
—	MF	NGA	Promise Victor (to RFS, later on loan to BFC Daugavpils)
—	MF	LVA	Kristers Pantelejevs (to Olaine)
—	MF	CZE	Marek Polašek (to (Czech Republic) Prostějov)
—	FW	LVA	Markuss Kruglaužs (to Rēzekne)
