= Hašek =

Hašek (feminine: Hašková) is a Czech-language surname that may refer to:

- Dominik Hašek, Czech ice hockey goaltender
- Dominika Hašková, Czech singer
- Eliška Hašková-Coolidge, Special Assistant to the U.S. Presidents
- Eduard Hašek, Czech athlete
- Eva Hašková (born 1946), Czech printmaker and illustrator
- Filip Hašek, Czech footballer
- Ivan Hašek, Czech footballer and coach
- Ivan Hašek (footballer, born 1987)
- Jaroslav Hašek (1883–1923), Czech writer known for the novel The Good Soldier Švejk
- Jiří Hašek
- John Hasek
- Martin Hašek (footballer, born 1969), Czech footballer and coach
- Martin Hašek (footballer, born 1995), Czech footballer
- Michal Hašek, Czech politician
- Zdenka Hásková

== See also ==
- Asteroid 2734 Hašek named after Jaroslav Hašek
- Hasek, Iran
