= 2019 UEFA European Under-21 Championship qualification Group 1 =

Football tournament qualification stage

Group 1 of the 2019 UEFA European Under-21 Championship qualifying competition consisted of six teams: Czech Republic, Croatia, Greece, Moldova, Belarus and San Marino. The composition of the nine groups in the qualifying group stage was decided by the draw held on 26 January 2017, with the teams seeded according to their coefficient ranking.

The group was played in home-and-away round-robin format between 7 June 2017 and 15 October 2018. The group winners qualified directly for the final tournament, while the runners-up advanced to the play-offs if they were one of the four best runners-up among all nine groups (not counting results against the sixth-placed team).

== Standings ==
Pos	Team	Pld	W	D	L	GF	GA	GD	Pts	Qualification	Croatia	Greece	Czech Republic	Belarus	Moldova	San Marino
1	Croatia	10	8	1	1	31	5	+26	25 (Note: Head-to-head results: Greece 1–1 Croatia, Croatia 2–0 Greece.)	Final tournament	—	2–0	5–1	2–1	4–0	5–0
2	Greece	10	8	1	1	26	5	+21	25	Play-offs	1–1	—	3–0	2–0	5–1	4–0
3	Czech Republic	10	5	1	4	14	15	−1	16		2–1	1–2	—	1–1	1–0	3–1
4	Belarus	10	4	2	4	11	14	−3	14		0–4	0–2	1–0	—	3–1	1–0
5	Moldova	10	2	1	7	8	23	−15	7		0–3	0–2	1–3	2–2	—	1–0
6	San Marino	10	0	0	10	1	29	−28	0		0–4	0–5	0–2	0–2	0–2	—

Source: UEFA
Rules for classification: Qualification tiebreakers

== Matches ==
Times are CET/CEST, (Note: CEST (UTC+2) for dates between 26 March and 28 October 2017 and between 25 March and 27 October 2018, and CET (UTC+1) for all other dates.) as listed by UEFA (local times, if different, are in parentheses).

7 June 2017
18:00 (19:00 FET)

Belarus	1–0	San Marino
Antilevsky 52' (pen.)	Report

Traktor Stadium, Minsk
Attendance: 200
Referee: Omar Pashayev (Azerbaijan)

13 June 2017
20:30

San Marino	0–2	Moldova
	Report	Damașcan 23', 48'

San Marino Stadium, Serravalle
Attendance: 483
Referee: Genc Nuza (Kosovo)

31 August 2017
19:00 (20:00 EEST)

Moldova	0–3	Croatia
	Report	Ćorić 4'; Brekalo 43', 61'

Zimbru Stadium, Chișinău
Attendance: 1,242
Referee: Aleksandrs Anufrijevs (Latvia)
1 September 2017
18:00 (19:00 FET)

Belarus	0–2	Greece
	Report	Galanopoulos 10'; Koulouris 79'

Haradski Stadium, Barysaw
Attendance: 4,250
Referee: Markus Hameter (Austria)

4 September 2017
17:30 (18:30 EEST)

Greece	5–1	Moldova
Galanopoulos 7'; Koulouris 45+2', 57'; Manthatis 47'; Androutsos 78' (pen.)	Report	Cărăruș 34'

Peristeri Stadium, Peristeri
Attendance: 311
Referee: Jovan Kaludjerović (Montenegro)
5 September 2017
18:00

Czech Republic	1–1	Belarus
Černý 8'	Report	Shibun 90+3'

Stadion Střelnice, Jablonec nad Nisou
Attendance: 3,126
Referee: Lasha Silagava (Georgia)

5 October 2017
18:00

Croatia	2–1	Belarus
Šimić 90+3'; Benković 90+6'	Report	Bakhar 48'

Stadion Varteks, Varaždin
Attendance: 1,500
Referee: Jens Maae (Denmark)
5 October 2017
18:00 (19:00 EEST)

Moldova	0–2	Greece
	Report	Saliakas 67'; Koulouris 84'

Zimbru Stadium, Chișinău
Attendance: 2,350
Referee: Sven Bindels (Luxembourg)

9 October 2017
18:00

Croatia	5–1	Czech Republic
Karačić 9'; Vlašić 36', 80'; Brekalo 47'; Moro 63'	Report	Mihálik 70'

Stadion Varteks, Varaždin
Attendance: 1,800
Referee: Mete Kalkavan (Turkey)
10 October 2017
18:00 (19:00 FET)

Belarus	3–1	Moldova
Antilevsky 70', 88' (pen.); Volkov 73'	Report	Pavlovets 32' (o.g.)

Haradski Stadium, Barysaw
Attendance: 2,550
Referee: Suren Baliyan (Armenia)
10 October 2017
20:30

San Marino	0–5	Greece
	Report	Karahalios 35'; Koulouris 43'; Vergos 73'; Androutsos 79'; Katranis 81'

San Marino Stadium, Serravalle
Attendance: 227
Referee: Alexandr Aliyev (Kazakhstan)

8 November 2017
14:00

Croatia	5–0	San Marino
Jakoliš 45', 69', 80'; Bočkaj 60'; Brekalo 90+3'	Report

Stadion Radnik, Velika Gorica
Attendance: 300
Referee: Georgi Vadachkoria (Georgia)

11 November 2017
15:30

Czech Republic	3–1	San Marino
Zajíc 63', 76'; Sáček 71'	Report	D'Addario 90+3'

Městský stadion, Ústí nad Labem
Attendance: 1,470
Referee: Mikhail Vilkov (Russia)

13 November 2017
15:30 (16:30 EET)

Greece	1–1	Croatia
Manthatis 65'	Report	Brekalo 74'

Toumba Stadium, Thessaloniki
Attendance: 2,836
Referee: Craig Pawson (England)
14 November 2017
16:00 (17:00 EET)

Moldova	1–3	Czech Republic
A. Macrițchii 11'	Report	Provod 15'; Bačo 59'; Knejzlík 71'

Zimbru Stadium, Chișinău
Attendance: 2,000
Referee: Robert Hennessy (Ireland)

22 March 2018
16:00 (17:00 EET)

Greece	4–0	San Marino
Vergos 37'; Androutsos 45', 53'; Tsimikas 56'	Report

Xanthi FC Arena, Xanthi
Attendance: 500
Referee: Fyodor Zammit (Malta)
23 March 2018
16:00

Czech Republic	2–1	Croatia
Lischka 13'; Hašek 71'	Report	Ćaleta-Car 62'

Městský stadion, Karviná
Attendance: 2,248
Referee: Alexandre Boucaut (Belgium)

25 March 2018
18:00

San Marino	0–2	Belarus
	Report	Shevchenko 16'; Antilevsky 28'

San Marino Stadium, Serravalle
Attendance: 500
Referee: Jason Barcelo (Gibraltar)
27 March 2018
15:00 (16:00 EEST)

Greece	3–0	Czech Republic
Limnios 7'; Manthatis 31'; Saliakas 52'	Report

Xanthi FC Arena, Xanthi
Attendance: 2,000
Referee: Vilhjalmur Thorarinsson (Iceland)
27 March 2018
16:30

Croatia	4–0	Moldova
Vlašić 35', 50'; Jakoliš 47'; Karačić 74'	Report

Stadion Radnik, Velika Gorica
Attendance: 500
Referee: Jari Järvinen (Finland)

5 September 2018
20:30

San Marino	0–2	Czech Republic
	Report	Ladra 50'; Král 52'

San Marino Stadium, Serravalle
Attendance: 281
Referee: Luis Teixeira (Portugal)
6 September 2018
17:00 (18:00 EEST)

Moldova	2–2	Belarus
Oancea 56'; Damașcan 75'	Report	Ebong 23'; Shevchenko 34'

CSR Orhei, Orhei
Attendance: 1,100
Referee: Giorgi Kruashvili (Georgia)

10 September 2018
16:00 (17:00 EEST)

Moldova	1–0	San Marino
Gulceac 28'	Report

CSR Orhei, Orhei
Attendance: 485
Referee: Daniyar Sakhi (Kazakhstan)
10 September 2018
18:00

Czech Republic	1–2	Greece
Takács 50'	Report	Limnios 44'; Tsimikas 56'

Stadion Střelnice, Jablonec nad Nisou
Attendance: 2,038
Referee: Christian Dingert (Germany)
10 September 2018
18:00 (19:00 FET)

Belarus	0–4	Croatia
	Report	Jakoliš 16'; Šunjić 44'; Halilović 46'; Brekalo 65'

Neman Stadium, Grodno
Attendance: 1,500
Referee: Radu Petrescu (Romania)

11 October 2018
18:00 (19:00 FET)

Belarus	1–0	Czech Republic
Antilevsky 56' (pen.)	Report

Haradski Stadium, Barysaw
Attendance: 270
Referee: Anders Poulsen (Denmark)
12 October 2018
18:00

Croatia	2–0	Greece
Pasalidis 41' (o.g.); Brekalo 90+4'	Report

Stadion Aldo Drosina, Pula
Attendance: 4,563
Referee: José María Sánchez Martínez (Spain)

15 October 2018
17:00

Czech Republic	1–0	Moldova
Pulkrab 5'	Report

Letní stadion, Chomutov
Attendance: 2,123
Referee: Glenn Nyberg (Sweden)
15 October 2018
18:30 (19:30 EEST)

Greece	2–0	Belarus
Chatzigiovannis 20'; Bouzoukis 82' (pen.)	Report

Peristeri Stadium, Peristeri
Attendance: 300
Referee: Nejc Kajtazovic (Slovenia)
15 October 2018
18:30

San Marino	0–4	Croatia
	Report	Halilović 48'; Vlašić 53'; Uremović 61'; Bosančić 68'

San Marino Stadium, Serravalle
Attendance: 217
Referee: Juxhin Xhaja (Albania)

== Goalscorers ==
There were 91 goals scored in 30 matches, for an average of 3.03 goals per match.

7 goals

- (Croatia) Josip Brekalo

5 goals

- (Belarus) Dmitry Antilevsky
- (Croatia) Marin Jakoliš
- (Croatia) Nikola Vlašić
- (Greece) Efthimis Koulouris

4 goals

- (Greece) Thanasis Androutsos

3 goals

- (Greece) Giorgos Manthatis
- (Moldova) Vitalie Damașcan

2 goals

- (Belarus) Yevgeniy Shevchenko
- (Croatia) Alen Halilović
- (Croatia) Fran Karačić
- (Czech Republic) Tomáš Zajíc
- (Greece) Konstantinos Galanopoulos
- (Greece) Dimitrios Limnios
- (Greece) Manolis Saliakas
- (Greece) Kostas Tsimikas
- (Greece) Nikos Vergos

1 goal

- (Belarus) Ivan Bakhar
- (Belarus) Max Ebong
- (Belarus) Mikhail Shibun
- (Belarus) Zakhar Volkov
- (Croatia) Filip Benković
- (Croatia) Petar Bočkaj
- (Croatia) Petar Bosančić
- (Croatia) Duje Ćaleta-Car
- (Croatia) Ante Ćorić
- (Croatia) Nikola Moro
- (Croatia) Lorenco Šimić
- (Croatia) Ivan Šunjić
- (Croatia) Filip Uremović
- (Czech Republic) Ondřej Bačo
- (Czech Republic) Václav Černý
- (Czech Republic) Filip Hašek
- (Czech Republic) Karel Knejzlík
- (Czech Republic) Alex Král
- (Czech Republic) Tomáš Ladra
- (Czech Republic) David Lischka
- (Czech Republic) Ondřej Mihálik
- (Czech Republic) Lukáš Provod
- (Czech Republic) Matěj Pulkrab
- (Czech Republic) Michal Sáček
- (Czech Republic) Laco Takács
- (Greece) Giannis Bouzoukis
- (Greece) Anastasios Chatzigiovannis
- (Greece) Zisis Karahalios
- (Greece) Alexandros Katranis
- (Moldova) Ion Cărăruș
- (Moldova) Vadim Gulceac
- (Moldova) Andrei Macrițchii
- (Moldova) Evgheni Oancea
- (San Marino) Alessandro D'Addario

1 own goal

- (Belarus) Aleksandr Pavlovets (against Moldova)
- (Greece) Triantafyllos Pasalidis (against Croatia)
