= Hasek =

Hasek may refer to:

- Hašek, Czech surname
- Hasek, Iran
