= Czech Republic national under-18 football team =

Czech Republic Under-18
- Association: Fotbalová asociace České republiky (FAČR)
- Confederation: UEFA (Europe)
- Head coach: Tomáš Kulvajt
- Captain: Lukáš Hůlka
- Most caps: David Kobylík (22)
- Top scorer: Jakub Mareš (6)
- FIFA code: CZE

FIFA ranking
- Current: 26

The Czech Republic national under-18 football team is a feeder team for the main Czech Republic national football team.

== 2018 Slovakia Cup ==
Pos	Team	Pld	W	D	L	GF	GA	GD	Pts	Qualification or relegation
1	Czech Republic	3	3	0	0	8	1	+7	9	Qualification to Final
2	United States	3	2	0	1	11	4	+7	6	
3	Ukraine	3	1	0	2	5	6	−1	3	
4	Kazakhstan	3	0	0	3	1	14	−13	0	

== Players ==
=== Current squad ===
The following players were named in the squad for the friendlies against Slovakia on 6 and 9 June 2023.

Caps and goals correct as of 28 March 2023, after the match against Norway.

No.	Pos.	Player	Date of birth (age)	Caps	Goals	Club
	GK	Matěj Čechal	1 February 2005 (age 21)	5	0	(Football Association of the Czech Republic) Sparta Prague
	GK	Viktor Baier	16 January 2005 (age 21)	3	0	(Football Association of the Czech Republic) Viktoria Plzeň
	GK	Adam Šimon	5 April 2005 (age 21)	1	0	(Football Association of the Czech Republic) Pardubice
	DF	Jiří Hamza	8 July 2005 (age 21)	9	0	(Football Association of the Czech Republic) Zbrojovka Brno
	DF	Eric Hunal	21 January 2005 (age 21)	8	0	(Football Association of the Czech Republic) Slavia Prague
	DF	Jan Paluska	25 June 2005 (age 21)	4	0	(Football Association of the Czech Republic) Viktoria Plzeň
	DF	Jakub Svatoš	13 April 2005 (age 21)	4	0	(Football Association of the Czech Republic) Pardubice
	DF	Zdeněk Toman	21 September 2005 (age 21)	3	0	(Football Association of the Czech Republic) Zbrojovka Brno
	DF	Mikuláš Konečný	2 June 2006 (age 20)	0	0	(Football Association of the Czech Republic) Slavia Prague
	MF	Filip Šancl	23 June 2005 (age 21)	9	2	(Football Association of the Czech Republic) Vysočina Jihlava
	MF	Jan Novák	3 January 2005 (age 21)	8	0	(Football Association of the Czech Republic) Pardubice
	MF	Adam Uriča	4 July 2005 (age 21)	7	0	(Football Association of the Czech Republic) Sigma Olomouc
	MF	Matěj Žitný	6 January 2005 (age 21)	5	0	(Football Association of the Czech Republic) Slavia Prague
	MF	Adam Proniuk	21 February 2005 (age 21)	3	1	(Football Association of the Czech Republic) Sigma Olomouc
	MF	David Krupička	11 May 2005 (age 21)	1	0	(Football Association of the Czech Republic) Baník Ostrava
	MF	Ondřej Deml	20 January 2005 (age 21)	0	0	(Football Association of the Czech Republic) Viktoria Plzeň
	MF	Pavel Gaszczyk	17 February 2005 (age 21)	0	0	(Football Association of the Czech Republic) Viktoria Plzeň
	MF	Matěj Zachoval	9 April 2005 (age 21)	0	0	(Football Association of the Czech Republic) Slavia Prague
	FW	Adam Pudil	7 April 2005 (age 21)	9	3	(Football Association of the Czech Republic) Slavia Prague
	FW	Pavel Hašek	22 January 2005 (age 21)	9	0	(Football Association of the Czech Republic) Viktoria Plzeň
	FW	Adam Hradisk	25 March 2005 (age 21)	0	0	(German Football Association) Dynamo Dresden
	FW	Vojtěch Hranoš	8 May 2006 (age 20)	0	0	(Football Association of the Czech Republic) Opava
	FW	Jiří Šplíchal	23 August 2005 (age 21)	0	0	(Football Association of the Czech Republic) Silon Táborsko

=== Recent call-ups ===
Pos.	Player	Date of birth (age)	Caps	Goals	Club	Latest call-up
DF	Jan Tobias Stryk	4 July 2005 (age 21)	6	2	(Czech Republic) Sigma Olomouc	v. Norway, 28 March 2023
MF	David Planka	28 July 2005 (age 21)	9	0	(Czech Republic) Slavia Prague	v. Norway, 28 March 2023
MF	Dan Karsten	22 March 2005 (age 21)	8	1	(Germany) Hertha BSC	v. Norway, 28 March 2023
MF	Michal Málek	28 July 2005 (age 21)	8	0	(Czech Republic) Baník Ostrava	v. Norway, 28 March 2023
MF	Vítězslav Pavlíček	4 June 2005 (age 21)	2	1	(Czech Republic) Sigma Olomouc	v. Norway, 28 March 2023
MF	Roman Horák	25 February 2005 (age 21)	4	1	(Czech Republic) Sparta Prague	v. United Arab Emirates, 29 November 2022
MF	Jakub Lopatář	10 March 2005 (age 21)	0	0	(Czech Republic) Slavia Prague	v. United Arab Emirates, 29 November 2022
MF	Miloš Pudil	7 April 2005 (age 21)	0	0	(Czech Republic) Slavia Prague	v. United Arab Emirates, 29 November 2022
FW	Matouš Krulich	19 April 2005 (age 21)	2	1	(Italy) Torino	v. United Arab Emirates, 29 November 2022
FW	Jan Buryán	11 October 2005 (age 21)	0	0	(Czech Republic) Mladá Boleslav	v. United Arab Emirates, 29 November 2022

== See also ==
- Czech Republic national football team
- Czech Republic national under-21 football team
- Czech Republic national under-19 football team
- Czech Republic national under-17 football team
