= Martin Hašek =

Martin Hašek may refer to:

- Martin Hašek (footballer, born 1969), Czech football coach and former player
- Martin Hašek (footballer, born 1995), Czech footballer
