= Pudil =

Pudil is a Czech surname. Notable people with the surname include:

- Adam Pudil (born 2005), Czech footballer
- Daniel Pudil (born 1985), Czech footballer
- Miloš Pudil (born 2005), Czech footballer
