= Jacopo Raschi =

San Marino footballer

Personal information
- Date of birth: 28 April 1998 (age 28)
- Place of birth: San Marino
- Position: Forward

Team information
- Current team: Folgore
- Number: 17

Senior career*
| Years | Team | Apps | (Gls) |
| 2016–2018 | Juvenes/Dogana | 13 | (3) |
| 2018–2020 | Cailungo | 25 | (6) |
| 2020–2021 | Juvenes/Dogana | 11 | (0) |
| 2021–2022 | Stella Rimini | 13 | (6) |
| 2022 | Virtus | 15 | (1) |
| 2022–2023 | Stella Rimini | 0 | (0) |
| 2023–2024 | Cailungo | 24 | (2) |
| 2024– | Folgore | 44 | (7) |

International career^{‡}
| 2017–2020 | San Marino U21 | 11 | (0) |
| 2022– | San Marino | 2 | (0) |
- * Club domestic league appearances and goals as of 5 June 2026 ‡ National team caps and goals as of 28 March 2022

Jacopo Raschi (born 28 April 1998) is Sammarinese footballer who currently plays as a forward for Folgore and the San Marino national team.

== Club career ==
Raschi has played for Juvenes/Dogana, Cailungo, and Virtus in the Campionato Sammarinese di Calcio. He began the 2021–2022 season with Italian club Polisportiva Stella Rimini before returning to San Marino with S.S. Virtus. He went on to score six goals in thirteen league appearances for the club in the Prima Categoria Emilia–Romagna (VII) that season.

== International career ==
Raschi made a total of eleven appearances for the San Marino U21 team in 2019 UEFA European Under-21 Championship qualification and 2021 UEFA European Under-21 Championship qualification. He had previously represented San Marino at the under-19 level in 2015 UEFA European Under-19 Championship qualification.

He received his first senior call up in September 2021 for a 2022 FIFA World Cup qualification match away against Albania. He made his senior international debut on 25 March 2022 in a 1–2 friendly defeat to Lithuania at the San Marino Stadium.

=== International statistics ===
As of match played 28 March 2022

San Marino
| Year | Apps | Goals |
|---|---|---|
| 2022 | 2 | 0 |
| Total | 2 | 0 |
