= Karel Knejzlík =

Czech footballer (born 1996)

Personal information
- Date of birth: 23 October 1996 (age 30)
- Place of birth: Stráž pod Ralskem, Czech Republic
- Height: 1.83 m (6 ft 0 in)
- Position: Left-back

Team information
- Current team: Velké Hamry
- Number: 77

Youth career
- Stráž pod Ralskem
- Slovan Liberec

Senior career*
Years	Team	Apps	(Gls)
2016–2020	Slovan Liberec	4	(0)
2016–2017	→ Varnsdorf (loan)	39	(1)
2017	→ Hradec Králové (loan)	7	(1)
2019–2020	→ Opava (loan)	0	(0)
2021–2024	Přepeře		
2024–2026	Arsenal Česká Lípa		
2026–	Velké Hamry		

International career
2011–2012	Czech Republic U16	10	(0)
2014	Czech Republic U18	5	(1)
2017–2018	Czech Republic U21	7	(1)
- * Club domestic league appearances and goals as of 19:25, 24 May 2023 (UTC)

Karel Knejzlík (born 23 October 1996) is a professional Czech footballer, who plays as a left-back for Velké Hamry.

== Youth career ==
He started playing football at FK Stráž pod Ralskem before moving to the Slovan Liberec youth setup.

== Club career ==
He started his professional career at Liberec. He went on an 18-month loan to the Czech National Football League side Varnsdorf in January 2016 and made his competitive debut in their 0–0 draw at Ústí nad Labem on 11 March. He scored his first league goal on 3 March 2017 in Varnsdorf's 1–0 win at České Budějovice. Upon his return to Liberec, he made two league appearances in 2017 before going on loan to another National Football League club, Hradec Králové.

== International career ==
He represented the Czech Republic in the Under-16, Under-18 and Under-21 youth categories.
