= Viktor Baier =

Czech footballer (born 2005)

Personal information
- Date of birth: 16 January 2005 (age 21)
- Place of birth: Příbram, Czech Republic
- Height: 2.01 m (6 ft 7 in)
- Position: Goalkeeper

Team information
- Current team: Viktoria Plzeň

Youth career
- 2011–2020: Příbram
- 2020–2023: Viktoria Plzeň

Senior career*
Years	Team	Apps	(Gls)
2022–2025	Viktoria Plzeň B	23	(0)
2023–	Viktoria Plzeň	3	(0)
2025–2026	→ Blau-Weiß Linz (loan)	17	(0)

International career
2021	Czech Republic U17	1	(0)
2022–2023	Czech Republic U18	4	(0)
2023–	Czech Republic U19	2	(0)
- * Club domestic league appearances and goals as of 18:44, 20 March 2026 (UTC)

Viktor Baier (born 16 January 2005) is a Czech professional footballer who currently plays as a goalkeeper for Czech First League club Viktoria Plzeň.

== Early life ==
Baier was born in Příbram to former volleyball player Petr Baier, who played for the local side. As a child, he took an interest in volleyball himself, as well as playing ice hockey.

== Club career ==
Baier began his career in the academy of Příbram, where he was coached by former professional goalkeeper Radek Sňozík, before moving to Viktoria Plzeň at the age of fifteen. After Viktoria Plzeň qualified for the UEFA Champions League ahead of the 2022–23 season, the under-19 side automatically qualified for the UEFA Youth League, and despite beginning their campaign with losses to Inter Milan and Barcelona, they recorded their first victory against German opposition Bayern Munich, with Baier establishing himself as the team's first-choice goalkeeper with impressive performances.

The following year, in June 2023, he was invited to join a select group of international players as part of Bayern Munich's World Squad, where they would play in friendly matches against a number of youth sides. Baier later revealed that he had already been invited to trial with the German side by goalkeeping coach, and former Czech Republic international, Jaroslav Drobný after watching him in the UEFA Youth League, but he had been unable to attend after Viktoria Plzeň rejected the approach.

Though he was linked with a move to Bayern Munich, he decided to return to Viktoria Plzeň, stating that if he were to make the move, he would have to train with the club's under-19 side, and this would be a step back from training with the first team at Viktoria Plzeň. In late October 2023, with first-choice goalkeeper Jindřich Staněk ruled out due to concussion, Baier was named as a starter in Viktoria Plzeň's UEFA Europa Conference League tie against Croatian opposition Dinamo Zagreb. Viktoria's coach Miroslav Koubek, a former goalkeeper himself, decided that Baier would start following usual reserve goalkeeper Marián Tvrdoň's poor performance in the team's 3–0 loss to Slovan Liberec the previous week.

Having kept a clean sheet in Viktoria's 1–0 win, he remained a starter for the next fixture - a Czech First League fixture against Karviná. Despite surprisingly losing the game 1–0, Baier was commended for his performance. His next appearance would again come in the UEFA Europa Conference League, keeping a clean sheet in another 1–0 win, this time against Kosovan side Ballkani.

On 20 June 2025, Baier joined Austrian Football Bundesliga club Blau-Weiß Linz on a loan deal without option to buy.

== International career ==
Baier has represented the Czech Republic from under-17 to under-19 level.

== Style of play ==
Standing at 2.01 m tall, Baier has earned comparisons to legendary Czech goalkeeper Petr Čech.

== Career statistics ==
=== Club ===
As of 20 March 2026.

Appearances and goals by club, season and competition
Club	Season	League			Cup (Note: Includes Czech Cup and Austrian Cup)		Continental		Other		Total	
Club	Season	Division	Apps	Goals	Apps	Goals	Apps	Goals	Apps	Goals	Apps	Goals
Viktoria Plzeň B	2021–22	Czech National Football League	2	0	–		–		0	0	2	0
Viktoria Plzeň B	2022–23	Czech National Football League	2	0	–		–		0	0	2	0
Viktoria Plzeň B	2023–24	Czech National Football League	7	0	–		–		0	0	7	0
Viktoria Plzeň B	2024–25	Czech National Football League	12	0	–		–		0	0	12	0
Viktoria Plzeň B	Total		23	0	0	0	0	0	0	0	23	0
Viktoria Plzeň	2023–24	Czech First League	1	0	1	0	3 (Note: Appearances in the UEFA Europa Conference League)	0	0	0	5	0
Viktoria Plzeň	2024–25	Czech First League	2	0	2	0	0	0	0	0	4	0
Viktoria Plzeň	2025–26	Czech First League	0	0	0	0	0	0	0	0	0	0
Viktoria Plzeň	Total		3	0	3	0	3	0	0	0	9	0
Blau-Weiß Linz (loan)	2025–26	Austrian Bundesliga	17	0	3	0	–		0	0	20	0
Career total			43	0	6	0	3	0	0	0	52	0
