= Barthélemy Diedhiou =

Senegalese footballer (born 2001)

Personal information
- Date of birth: 2 January 2001 (age 25)
- Place of birth: Thiès, Senegal
- Height: 1.79 m (5 ft 10 in)
- Positions: Winger; forward

Team information
- Current team: FK Auda
- Number: 25

Youth career
- Lille

Senior career*
Years	Team	Apps	(Gls)
2019–2024	Lille B	20	(2)
2021–2022	→ Trofense (loan)	9	(0)
2024–2025	BFC Daugavpils	50	(13)
2025	→ FK RFS (loan)	5	(0)
2026–	FK Auda	22	(1)
- * Club domestic league appearances and goals as of 12 November 2026

Barthélemy Diedhiou (born 2 January 2001) is a Senegalese footballer who plays as a winger or forward for Latvian Virslīga club FK Auda.

== Career ==
In 2021, Diedhiou was sent on loan to Portuguese second division side Trofense from Lille in the French Ligue 1. On 12 September 2021, he debuted for Trofense during a 0-0 draw with Casa Pia. On 1 July, 2025, Diedhiou was loaned out to fellow Virslīga side FK RFS After transferring to RFS, Diedhiou scored a volleyed chip from outside to box to cut Europa League third qualifying round opponents KuPS's advantage down to one goal, the score ended 2–1.
