= Mikhail Shibun =

Belarusian footballer

Personal information
- Date of birth: 1 January 1996 (age 30)
- Place of birth: Malech, Biaroza Raion, Brest Oblast, Belarus
- Height: 1.78 m (5 ft 10 in)
- Position: Left midfielder

Youth career
- 2012–2014: Shakhtyor Soligorsk

Senior career*
Years	Team	Apps	(Gls)
2015–2019	Shakhtyor Soligorsk	21	(1)
2017	→ Gorodeya (loan)	13	(1)
2019	→ Torpedo-BelAZ Zhodino (loan)	1	(0)
2019	→ Minsk (loan)	5	(0)
2020	Gorodeya	25	(1)
2021	Krumkachy Minsk	31	(8)
2022	Minsk	4	(0)
2022	Shakhtyor Petrikov	3	(0)
2023	Respect Soligorsk	1	(0)

International career
2012–2013	Belarus U17	5	(0)
2013–2014	Belarus U19	7	(0)
2015–2018	Belarus U21	15	(1)
- * Club domestic league appearances and goals as of 31 December 2023

Mikhail Shibun (Belarusian: Міхаіл Шыбун; Russian: Михаил Шибун; born 1 January 1996) is a Belarusian professional footballer.

== Honours ==
Shakhtyor Soligorsk

- Belarusian Cup winner: 2018–19
