= Tomáš Rataj =

Czech footballer (born 2003)

Personal information
- Date of birth: 21 March 2003 (age 23)
- Position: Forward

Team information
- Current team: Jelgava
- Number: 17

Senior career*
Years	Team	Apps	(Gls)
2020–2026	Opava	112	(9)
2021	→ Bodø/Glimt (loan)	0	(0)
2026–	Jelgava	29	(6)
- * Club domestic league appearances and goals as of 12 November 2026

Tomáš Rataj (born 21 March 2003) is a Czech professional footballer who plays as a striker for Virslīga club Jelgava.

He made his Czech First League debut with SFC Opava in 2020. In 2021 he spent time on loan at Bodø/Glimt, only appearing in two cup matches.
