= Adam Pudil =

Czech footballer (born 2005)

Personal information
- Full name: Adam Pudil
- Date of birth: 7 April 2005 (age 21)
- Place of birth: Supíkovice, Czech Republic
- Height: 1.82 m (6 ft 0 in)
- Position: Winger

Team information
- Current team: Vlašim (loan)
- Number: 28

Youth career
- 2008-2016: Tatran Supíkovice
- 2016-2019: FK Jeseník
- 2019–2021: Slavia Prague

Senior career*
Years	Team	Apps	(Gls)
2022–	Slavia Prague	0	(0)
2022–	Slavia Prague B	46	(5)
2024–	→ Vlašim (loan)	10	(0)

International career^{‡}
2021–	Czech Republic U17	11	(4)
- * Club domestic league appearances and goals as of 4 January 2025 ‡ National team caps and goals as of 18:00, 15 April 2021 (UTC)

Adam Pudil (born 7 April 2005) is a Czech professional footballer who plays as a winger for Vlašim, on loan from Slavia Prague.

== Club career ==
Pudil began his career at local teams Tatran Supíkovice and Jeseník, before joining Slavia Prague in 2019. On 10 March 2022, Pudil made his debut for Slavia Prague, in a 4–1 UEFA Europa Conference League win against LASK.

== International career ==
In September 2021, Pudil made his debut for Czech Republic's under-17 side in the Syrenka Cup.

== Personal life ==
Pudil's identical twin, Miloš, also plays for Slavia Prague.
