= Jiří Šplíchal =

Czech footballer (born 2005)

Personal information
- Date of birth: 23 August 2005 (age 21)
- Position: Forward

Team information
- Current team: Silon Táborsko
- Number: 14

Youth career
- 2011–2020: ZVVZ Milevsko
- 2020–2021: Táborsko

Senior career*
Years	Team	Apps	(Gls)
2021–	Silon Táborsko	28	(2)
- * Club domestic league appearances and goals as of 15 June 2025

Jiří Šplíchal (born 23 August 2005) is a Czech footballer who currently plays as a forward for Silon Táborsko.

== Career statistics ==
=== Club ===
As of 10 November 2021.

Club	Season	League			Cup		Continental		Other		Total	
Club	Season	Division	Apps	Goals	Apps	Goals	Apps	Goals	Apps	Goals	Apps	Goals
Táborsko	2021–22	FNL	1	0	0	0	–		0	0	1	0
Career total			1	0	0	0	0	0	0	0	1	0
