= Martin Hašek (footballer, born 1969) =

Czech footballer (born 1969)

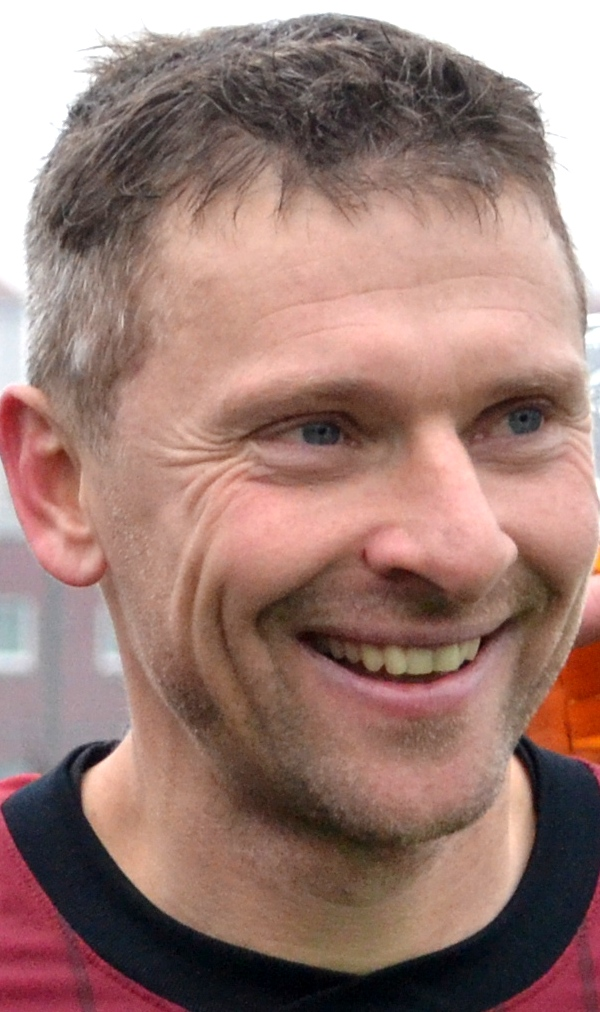

Personal information
- Date of birth: 11 October 1969 (age 57)
- Place of birth: Pardubice, Czechoslovakia
- Height: 1.78 m (5 ft 10 in)
- Position: Midfielder

Team information
- Current team: Dukla Prague (sporting director)

Youth career
- 1976–1980: RH Pardubice
- 1980–1989: VCHZ Pardubice

Senior career*
Years	Team	Apps	(Gls)
1989–1990	AS Pardubice		
1990–1992	Union Cheb	9	(0)
1992–1997	Slovan Liberec	130	(16)
1997–2001	Sparta Prague	104	(6)
2002–2003	Austria Wien	16	(1)
2003–2004	Sturm Graz	6	(0)
2004	Dynamo Moscow	16	(0)
2004–2006	Sparta Prague	28	(0)
2007	FK Příbram	17	(0)
2007	Přední Kopanina		

International career
1996–2001	Czech Republic	14	(0)

Managerial career
- 2007: Sparta Prague (assistant)
- 2008: Baník Sokolov
- 2009–2011: Sparta Prague (assistant)
- 2011–2012: Sparta Prague
- 2012–2014: Sparta Prague B
- 2014: FK Pardubice
- 2016–2017: Vlašim
- 2017–2019: Bohemians 1905
- 2022: Ústí nad Labem
- 2023: Zbrojovka Brno
- 2025–: Dukla Prague (sporting director)
- * Club domestic league appearances and goals

Martin Hašek (born 11 October 1969) is a Czech football coach and former player. He played in the top football leagues of Czechoslovakia, later the Czech Republic, as well as Austria and Russia. He represented the Czech Republic in international football, making 14 appearances for his country between 1996 and 2001.

== Career ==
Hašek was born in Pardubice. During his extensive playing career, he played as a midfielder for Pardubice, Union Cheb and Slovan Liberec before joining Sparta Prague in 1997. He later played for Austria Wien, Sturm Graz, Dynamo Moscow, FK Příbram and Přední Kopanina – before retiring at the age of 38. Hašek made 14 appearances for the Czech Republic.

Hašek began his managerial career immediately after retiring, first as an assistant to Sparta. After a brief spell as head coach of Baník Sokolov in the second league, he returned to Sparta as assistant coach to Jozef Chovanec in the winter break of the 2008–09 season. Ahead of the 2014–15 season he was named the head coach of FK Pardubice in the Czech second league. He was dismissed in December of the same year. In April 2017, eight games before the end of the 2016–17 season, Hašek became the new manager of Bohemians 1905, taking over from Miroslav Koubek with the team 13th in the table and just four points above the relegation places. Bohemians avoided relegation with one game left to play of the 2016–17 Czech First League.

He managed Ústí nad Labem for five matches in the spring of 2022 but was not able to save the club from relegation. He returned to club management in April 2023 to take over from Richard Dostálek as manager of Zbrojovka Brno. Brno were relegated at the end of the 2023–24 season and Hašek left the club.

On 3 June 2025, Hašek was appointed as sporting director of Dukla Prague.

== Personal life ==
Hašek's older brother, Dominik, had an extensive and successful ice hockey career in the NHL, as a goaltender. Hašek has three sons: Martin and Filip, who are both footballers, and a third called Mojmír.

== Honours ==
=== Player ===
Sparta Prague

- Czech First League: 1997–1998, 1998–1999, 1999–2000, 2000–2001, 2004–2005
- Czech Cup: 2006

Austria Wien

- Austrian Bundesliga: 2002–2003

Individual

- Czech First League: Team of the Year 1998–1999

=== Manager ===
- Czech Second League Manager of the Month: October 2016
