= Jiří Hašek =

Czech ice hockey player

- Born: November 15, 1977 (age 47); Ostrava, Czechoslovakia
- Height: 6 ft 2 in (188 cm)
- Weight: 216 lb (98 kg; 15 st 6 lb)
- Position: Forward
- Shoots: Left
- Czech Extraliga team: HC Kladno
- Playing career: 2000–present

Jiří Hašek (born November 15, 1977) is a Czech professional ice hockey player. He played with HC Kladno in the Czech Extraliga during the 2010–11 Czech Extraliga season.
