= Richmond Owusu =

Ghanaian footballer

Personal information
- Full name: Richmond Owusu
- Date of birth: 2 February 2003 (age 23)
- Place of birth: Kumasi, Ghana
- Height: 1.83 m (6 ft 0 in)
- Position: Left back

Team information
- Current team: Valmiera
- Number: 99

Youth career
- –2021: Žilina Africa
- 2021–2022: Žilina

Senior career*
Years	Team	Apps	(Gls)
2021–2023	Žilina B	46	(2)
2021–2023	Žilina	22	(0)
2024–	Valmiera	0	(0)
2024–	Valmiera II	12	(3)
- * Club domestic league appearances and goals as of 11 November 2024

Richmond Owusu (born 2 February 2003) is a Ghanaian professional footballer who currently plays for Valmiera in the Latvian Higher League as a defender.

== Club career ==
=== MŠK Žilina ===
Owusu made his Fortuna Liga debut for Žilina at pod Čebraťom against Ružomberok on 14 February 2022. Owusu came on to replace compatriot and international Benson Anang after 69 minutes of play. Žilina lost the game 5–1.
