= Ion Cărăruș =

Moldovan footballer

Personal information
- Date of birth: 25 June 1996 (age 30)
- Place of birth: Chișinău, Moldova
- Height: 1.82 m (6 ft 0 in)
- Position: Midfielder

Team information
- Current team: Corvinul Hunedoara
- Number: 23

Youth career
- 2006–2013: Zimbru Chișinău
- 2013–2014: Braga

Senior career*
Years	Team	Apps	(Gls)
2015–2016	União de Leiria	0	(0)
2015–2016	→ GD Peniche (loan)	23	(0)
2016–2017	Zimbru Chișinău	8	(0)
2017	Zaria Bălți	7	(0)
2017–2018	Știința Miroslava	20	(0)
2019–2020	Härnösand		
2020–2021	Farul Constanța	24	(0)
2021	Unirea Constanța	4	(0)
2021–2023	1599 Șelimbăr	38	(3)
2023–2024	Mioveni	25	(3)
2024–	Corvinul Hunedoara	67	(8)

International career^{‡}
2016–2017	Moldova U21 (Note: Only official UEFA matches included)	11	(1)
2026–	Moldova	1	(0)
- * Club domestic league appearances and goals as of 7 November 2026 ‡ National team caps and goals as of 26 March 2026

Ion Cărăruș (born 25 June 1996) is a Moldovan professional footballer who plays as a midfielder for Liga I club Corvinul Hunedoara and the Moldova national team.

== Career ==
Cărăruș made his professional debut for Zimbru in the Divizia Națională on 11 September 2016 against Zaria Bălți.

== Career statistics ==
As of match played 26 March 2026

Appearances and goals by national team and year
National team	Year	Apps	Goals
Moldova
Moldova	2026	1	0
Total		1	0

== Honours ==
Corvinul Hunedoara

- Liga II: 2025–26
- Supercupa României runner-up: 2024
