= Nils Toms Puriņš =

Latvian footballer (born 1998)

Nils Puriņš
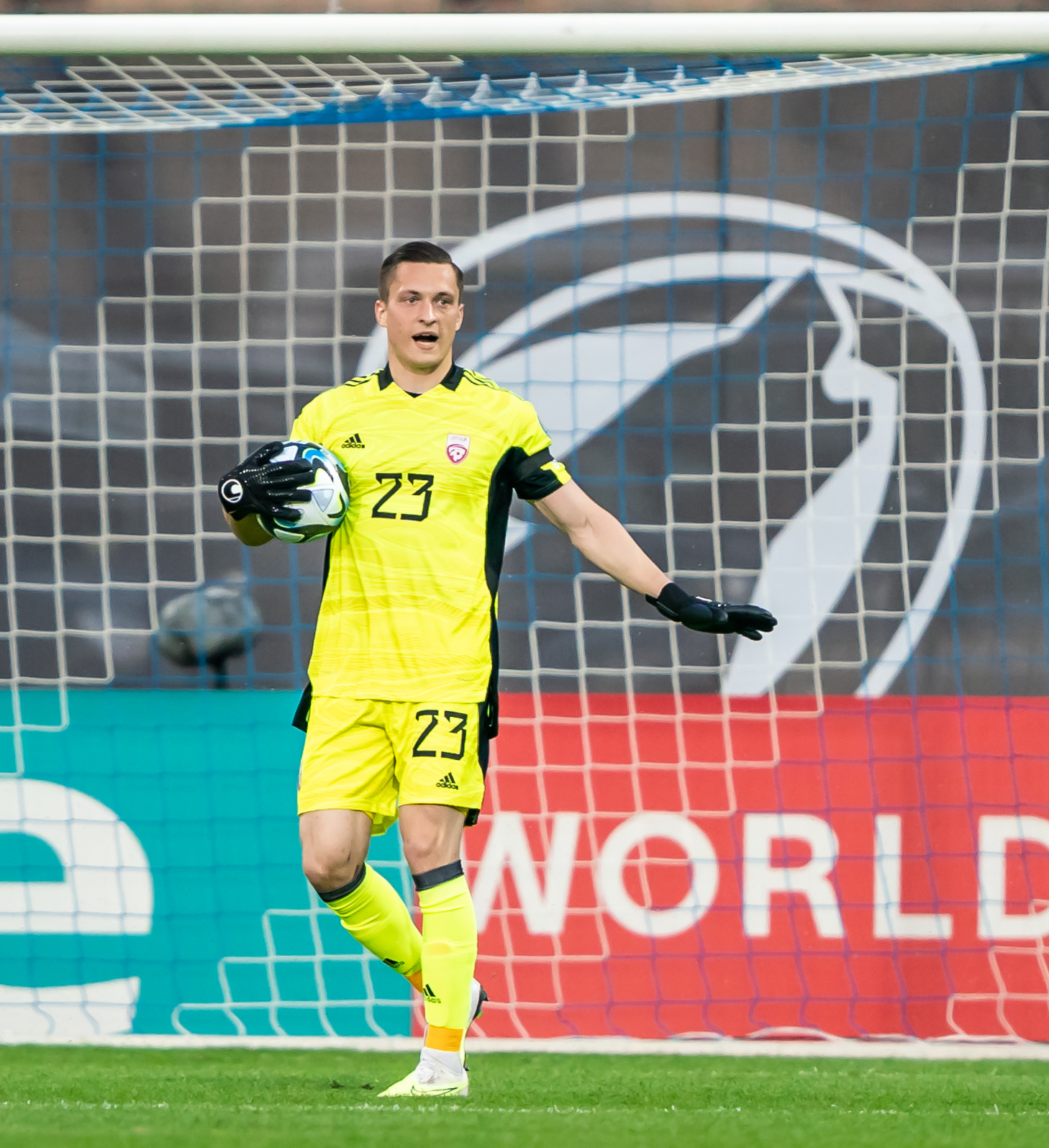

Personal information
- Full name: Nils Toms Puriņš
- Date of birth: 1 August 1998 (age 28)
- Place of birth: Jūrmala, Latvia
- Height: 1.86 m (6 ft 1 in)
- Position: Goalkeeper

Team information
- Current team: FK Auda (on loan from Riga FC)
- Number: 98

Youth career
- -2016: Skonto Academy
- 2016-2017: FK Jelgava II

Senior career*
Years	Team	Apps	(Gls)
2018-	Riga FC	81	(0)
2025	→ SK Super Nova (loan)	5	(0)
2026-	→ FK Auda (loan)	30	(0)

International career^{‡}
2013-2014	Latvia U-16	4	(0)
2014-2015	Latvia U-17	9	(0)
2015-2016	Latvia U-19	5	(0)
2019–2020	Latvia U-21	7	(0)
2023–	Latvia	3	(0)
- * Club domestic league appearances and goals as of 12 November 2026 ‡ National team caps and goals as of 1 April 2024 (UTC)

Nils Toms Puriņš (born 1 August 1998) is a Latvian footballer who plays as a goalkeeper for FK Auda, on loan from Riga FC and the Latvia national team.

== Career ==
Puriņš made his international debut for Latvia on 16 June 2023 in a UEFA Euro 2024 qualifying match against Turkey playing full match.

== Career statistics ==
=== Club ===
As of match played 13 April 2025

Appearances and goals by club, season and competition
Club	Season	League			Latvian Cup		Continental		Other		Total	
Club	Season	Division	Apps	Goals	Apps	Goals	Apps	Goals	Apps	Goals	Apps	Goals
Skonto FC	2014	Virslīga	0	0	0	0	—		—		0	0
FK Jelgava	2017	Virslīga	0	0	0	0	0	0	—		0	0
Riga FC	2018	Virslīga	0	0	0	0	0	0	—		0	0
Riga FC	2019	Virslīga	4	0	1	0	0	0	—		5	0
Riga FC	2020	Virslīga	4	0	1	0	0	0	—		5	0
Riga FC	2021	Virslīga	3	0	0	0	0	0	—		3	0
Riga FC	2022	Virslīga	20	0	0	0	6 (Note: Appearance(s) in UEFA Europa Conference League)	0	—		26	0
Riga FC	2023	Virslīga	27	0	1	0	6	0	—		34	0
Riga FC	2024	Virslīga	22	0	0	0	0	0	0	0	22	0
Riga FC	2025	Virslīga	1	0	0	0	0	0	1 (Note: Appearance(s) in Latvian Supercup)	0	2	0
Riga FC	Total		81	0	3	0	12	0	1	0	97	0
Career total			81	0	3	0	12	0	1	0	97	0

=== International ===
As of match played 8 September 2023

Appearances and goals by national team and year
National team	Year	Apps	Goals
Latvia	2023	3	0
Total		3	0

== Honours ==
- Latvian Higher League: 2018, 2019, 2020
