= Andrej Bogićević =

Serbian association footballer

Andrea Bogićević
Personal information
- Date of birth: 3 January 2002 (age 24)
- Place of birth: Loznica, Serbia
- Height: 1.84 m (6 ft 0 in)
- Position: Striker

Team information
- Current team: Riga II

Youth career
- 2009-2010: Loznica
- 2010–2012: Partizan
- 2012–2014: Čukarički
- 2014–2016: Voždovac
- 2016–2021: Grafičar

Senior career*
Years	Team	Apps	(Gls)
2021	Zlatibor Čajetina	11	(0)
2021–2022	Spartak Subotica	2	(0)
2022–2024	Masfout		
2024–2025	Primorje	0	(0)
2025	Grafičar	1	(0)
2025–2026	Auda	3	(0)
2026–	Riga II	0	(0)
- * Club domestic league appearances and goals as of 8 March 2026

Andrej Bogićević (born 3 January 2002) is a Serbian professional footballer who plays as a striker for Latvian club Riga II.

== Career ==
=== Partizan ===
Bogicevic started to play football at the age of seven, his first club was Jadar from Gornji Dobrić. Then he moved to FK Loznica, and then Savacium Sabac. When he scored two goals against Partizan, he received an invitation of the legendary Momčilo "Moca" Vukotić to join the younger categories of Partizan. At the beginning he played friendly matches where he proved himself with goals and deserved to be registered in Partizan.

=== Grafičar ===
He moved from Partizan to Čukarički, where he signed a scholarship agreement. After that he went from Banovo brdo to Voždovac, and then to Grafičar. He played his best games in that club where he deserved a transfer and the first professional contract

=== Zlatibor ===
Bogićević signed his first professional contract with Zlatibor at the middle of the 2020–21 season when the club competed in the Serbian SuperLiga. On 5 January 2021, he became a player of the team from Čajetina. He made his debut on 12 February 2021 in a league match against Proleter in which the result was 2–2 and he spent 45 minutes on the field. He played a total of 11 games in his first professional half-season, in the Serbian elite.

=== Spartak Subotica ===
On 2 September 2021, he signed a four-year contract with Spartak Subotica.

== Career statistics ==
As of 23 May 2021

Club	Season	League			Cup		Continental		Other		Total	
Club	Season	Division	Apps	Goals	Apps	Goals	Apps	Goals	Apps	Goals	Apps	Goals
FK Zlatibor Čajetina	2020–21	Superleague	11	0	0	0	—		—		11	0
FK Zlatibor Čajetina	Total		11	0	0	0	—		—		11	0
Career Totals			11	0	0	0	0	0	—		11	0
