= Yukiyoshi Karashima =

Japanese footballer (born 1997

Personal information
- Date of birth: 15 January 1997 (age 29)
- Place of birth: Fukushima Prefecture, Japan
- Height: 1.75 m (5 ft 9 in)
- Position: Midfielder

Team information
- Current team: Kauno Žalgiris
- Number: 8

Youth career
- Toin Gakuen High School

College career
Years	Team	Apps	(Gls)
2015–2019	Biwako Seikei Sport College		

Senior career*
Years	Team	Apps	(Gls)
2019–2020	FC Hürth	8	(1)
2020	Riga FC	4	(0)
2021–2022	Hegelmann	66	(15)
2023–2024	Žalgiris	65	(2)
2023–2024	→ Žalgiris B	2	(0)
2025	RFS	15	(3)
2025	→ HJK (loan)	2	(0)
2026–	Kauno Žalgiris	20	(1)
- * Club domestic league appearances and goals as of 13 July 2026

Yukiyoshi Karashima (Japanese: 辛島侑烈; born 15 January 1997) is a Japanese professional footballer who plays as a midfielder for Toplyga club Kauno Žalgiris.

== Early life ==
Karashima was born on 15 January 1997. Born in Fukushima Prefecture, Japan, he is a native of the prefecture. Growing up, he attended Toin Gakuen High School in Japan. Afterwards, he attended Biwako Seikei Sport College in Japan.

== Career ==
Karashima started his career with German side FC Hürth, where he made eight league appearances and scored one goal. During the summer of 2020, he signed for Latvian side Riga FC, where he made four league appearances and scored zero goals.

Ahead of the 2021 season, he signed for Lithuanian side FC Hegelmann, where he made sixty-six league appearances and scored fifteen goals. Lithuanian news website 15min wrote in 2023 that he "established himself as one of the brightest midfielders" while playing for the club. In 2023, he signed for Lithuanian side FK Žalgiris, where he made sixty-five league appearances and scored two goals and helped the club win the league title and the 2023 Lithuanian Supercup. Following his stint there, he signed for Latvian side FK RFS in 2025.

On 15 August 2025, he was loaned to Veikkausliiga club HJK Helsinki until the end of the season with an option-to-buy.

On 8 January 2026, Karashima signed for Lithuanian club FK Kauno Žalgiris.

== Style of play ==
Karashima plays as a midfielder, Right-footed, he is known for his shooting ability.

== Honours ==
Kauno Žalgiris

- Toplyga: 2026
- Lithuanian Cup: 2026
- Lithuanian Supercup: 2026
