= Miloš Pudil =

Czech footballer (born 2005)

Personal information
- Date of birth: 7 April 2005 (age 21)
- Place of birth: Supíkovice, Czech Republic
- Height: 1.76 m (5 ft 9 in)
- Position: Midfielder

Team information
- Current team: FS Jelgava
- Number: 22

Youth career
- Tatran Supíkovice
- Jeseník
- 2019–2021: Slavia Prague

Senior career*
Years	Team	Apps	(Gls)
2022–	Slavia Prague	0	(0)
2022–	Slavia Prague B	11	(0)
2024	→ Vlašim (loan)	2	(0)
2025	→ Sokol Hostouň (loan)	31	(2)
2026–	FS Jelgava	25	(2)

International career^{‡}
2020	Czech Republic U16	3	(0)
2021–	Czech Republic U17	10	(2)
- * Club domestic league appearances and goals as of 12 November 2026 ‡ National team caps and goals as of 18:00, 15 April 2021 (UTC)

Miloš Pudil (born 7 April 2005) is a Czech professional footballer who plays as a midfielder for Latvian club FS Jelgava.

== Club career ==
Pudil began his career at local teams Tatran Supíkovice and Jeseník, before joining Slavia Prague in 2019. On 24 February 2022, Pudil made his debut for Slavia Prague, in a 3–2 UEFA Europa Conference League win against Fenerbahçe.

== International career ==
In July 2020, Pudil made his debut for Czech Republic's under-16 side in the František Harašta Memorial Cup. In September 2021, Pudil made his debut for the under-17's in the Syrenka Cup.

== Personal life ==
Pudil's identical twin, Adam, also plays for Slavia Prague.
