= Tayrell Wouter =

Dutch footballer (born 2002)

Personal information
- Full name: Tayrell Jomar Wouter
- Date of birth: 12 July 2002 (age 24)
- Place of birth: Amsterdam, Netherlands
- Height: 1.79 m (5 ft 10 in)
- Position: Winger

Team information
- Current team: OFK Beograd
- Number: 7

Youth career
- De Volewijckers
- Zeeburgia
- Utrecht
- –2019: Twente
- 2019–2020: Go Ahead Eagles

Senior career*
Years	Team	Apps	(Gls)
2020–2021	De Volewijckers		
2021–2023	Jong Volendam	52	(16)
2022	Volendam	0	(0)
2023	Be1		
2024	Dila Gori	35	(19)
2025	Apollon Limassol	8	(1)
2025–2026	RFS	7	(1)
2026–	OFK Beograd	10	(1)
- * Club domestic league appearances and goals as of 12 June 2026

Tayrell Jomar Wouter (born 12 July 2002) is a Dutch professional footballer who plays as a winger for Serbian SuperLiga club OFK Beograd.

== Career ==
Wouter started his career with Dutch side De Volewijckers in 2020. One year later, he signed for the reserve team of Dutch side Volendam and was promoted to the club's first team in 2022. During the summer of 2023, he signed for Lithuanian side Be1, helping the club achieve second place in the league.

Ahead of the 2024 season, he signed for Georgian side Dila Gori. Georgian news website Crystalsport wrote in 2025 that he was "one of the Crystalbet National Football League players" while playing for the club. Subsequently, he signed for Cypriot side Apollon Limassol.

== Style of play ==
Wouter plays as a winger. Right-footed, he is known for his speed and technical ability.

== Personal life ==
Wouter was born on 12 July 2002 in the Netherlands and is of Surinamese descent through his parents. In 2022, he was accused of assaulting a woman at a nightclub in Amsterdam but was later cleared.
