= Iván Erquiaga =

Argentine footballer

Personal information
- Full name: Iván Erquiaga
- Date of birth: 26 March 1998 (age 28)
- Place of birth: Vivoratá, Argentina
- Height: 1.77 m (5 ft 10 in)
- Position: Left-back

Youth career
- Defensores de Vivoratá
- Los Patos de Balcarce
- Aldosivi
- 2015–2018: Estudiantes

Senior career*
Years	Team	Apps	(Gls)
2018–2021	Estudiantes	30	(0)
2021	→ Huracan (loan)	6	(0)
2022–2023	Quilmes	52	(0)
2024–2025	Riga FC	33	(1)
2025–2026	Auda	13	(0)
2026	Instituto	2	(0)
- * Club domestic league appearances and goals as of 18:16, 10 May 2026 (UTC)

Iván Erquiaga (born 26 March 1998) is an Argentine professional footballer who plays as a left-back.

== Club career ==
Erquiaga started his footballing career with spells at Defensores de Vivoratá, Los Patos de Balcarce and Aldosivi; prior to joining Estudiantes in 2015. He was first an unused substitute for an Argentine Primera División fixture with Belgrano on 20 April 2018, prior to making his professional debut on 14 May during a 1–1 draw away to Rosario Central. Erquiaga's next appearance coincided with his continental bow when he was selected for a Copa Libertadores encounter against Grêmio in August.

On 17 February 2021, Erquiaga joined Huracan on a one-year loan with a purchase option of 1,200,000 dollars for 80% of his pass. Erquiaga made a total of six appearances for Huracan, before returning to Estudiantes. In January 2022, Erquiaga joined Quilmes on a deal until the end of 2023.

On 12 January 2024, Latvian club Riga FC announced the signing of Erquiaga.

== International career ==
Erquiaga has previously been selected by the Argentina U20s for training.

== Career statistics ==
As of 12 October 2018.

Club statistics
Club	Season	League			Cup (Note: Includes the Copa Argentina)		League Cup		Continental (Note: Includes the Copa Libertadores and Copa Sudamericana)		Other		Total	
Club	Season	Division	Apps	Goals	Apps	Goals	Apps	Goals	Apps	Goals	Apps	Goals	Apps	Goals
Estudiantes	2017–18	Primera División	1	0	0	0	—		0	0	0	0	1	0
Estudiantes	2018–19	Primera División	6	0	2	0	—		2 (Note: Two appearances in the 2018 Copa Libertadores)	0	0	0	10	0
Career total			7	0	2	0	—		2	0	0	0	11	0
