= Supíkovice =

- Municipality
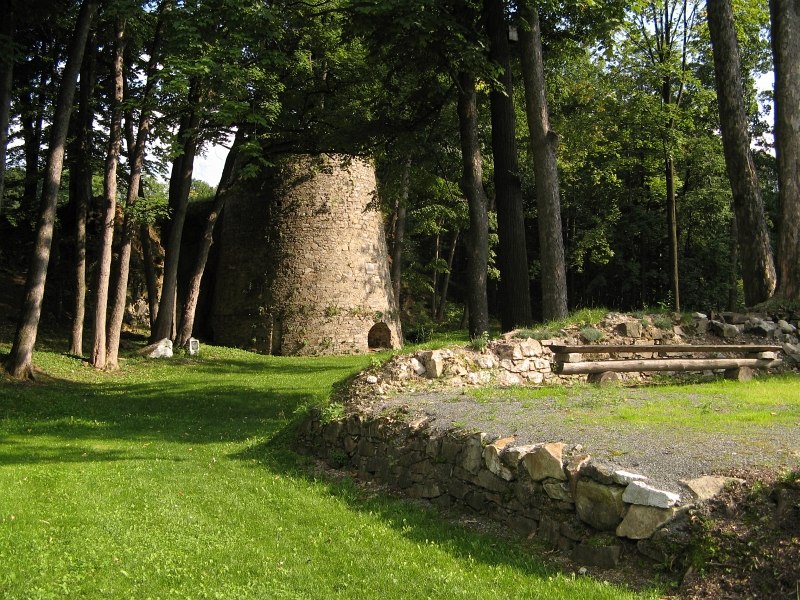
- Lime kiln

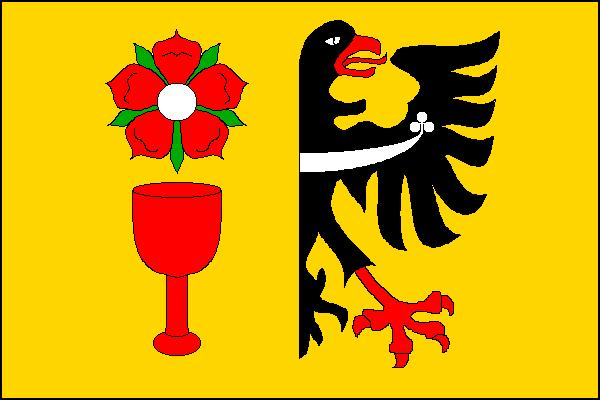
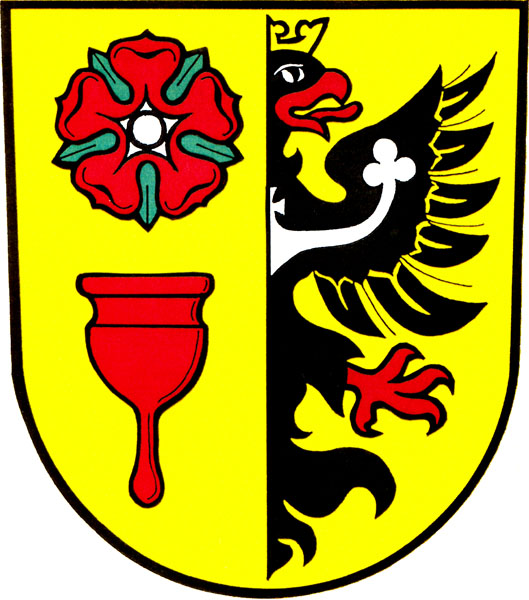
- Flag Coat of arms

- Location in the Czech Republic
- Coordinates: 50°17′52″N 17°15′19″E
- Country: Czech Republic
- Region: Olomouc
- District: Jeseník
- First mentioned: 1284

Area
  - Total: 9.28 km^{2} (3.58 sq mi)
- Elevation: 407 m (1,335 ft)

Population (2026-01-01)
  - Total: 637
  - Density: 68.6/km^{2} (178/sq mi)
- Time zone: UTC+1 (CET)
  - Summer (DST): UTC+2 (CEST)
- Postal code: 790 51
- Website: www.supikovice.cz

Supíkovice (German: Saubsdorf) is a municipality and village in Jeseník District in the Olomouc Region of the Czech Republic. It has about 600 inhabitants.

== Etymology ==
The name is probably derived from the personal Slavic name Šupík, while the German name is thought to have been created by transcription. The Czech name has been used again since 1924.

== Geography ==
Supíkovice is located 8 kilometres (5 mi) northeast of Jeseník and 77 km (48 mi) north of Olomouc. It lies on the border between the Golden Mountains and Zlatohorská Highlands. The highest point is the hill Křemenáč at 735 m (2,411 ft) above sea level.

== History ==
The first written mention of Supíkovice is from 1284, when it was part of fragmented Piast-ruled Poland. It soon became part of the Duchy of Nysa, which later on passed under Bohemian suzerainty, and following the duchy's dissolution in 1850, it was incorporated directly into Bohemia.

The municipality was in the past known for limestone quarries and lime production. In the second half of the 19th century, the municipality became known for mining and processing of granite and marble.

Following World War I, from 1918, the municipality formed part of Czechoslovakia and from 1938 to 1945 it was occupied by Germany. During World War II, the German administration operated the E166 and E577 forced labour subcamps of the Stalag VIII-B/344 prisoner-of-war camp for Allied POWs in the village.

== Demographics ==
Historical population

Year	Pop.	±%
1869	1,106	—
1880	1,255	+13.5%
1890	1,307	+4.1%
1900	1,378	+5.4%
1910	1,655	+20.1%

Year	Pop.	±%
1921	1,540	−6.9%
1930	1,734	+12.6%
1950	766	−55.8%
1961	856	+11.7%
1970	775	−9.5%

Year	Pop.	±%
1980	713	−8.0%
1991	689	−3.4%
2001	671	−2.6%
2011	672	+0.1%
2021	611	−9.1%

Source: Censuses

== Transport ==
There are no railways or major roads passing through the municipality.

== Sights ==
The only protected cultural monument is a lime kiln from the 19th century.

The oldest building in Supíkovice is the Church of Saint Hedwig. It dates from the 16th century.

== Notable people ==
- Petr Ševčík (born 1994), footballer; grew up here
