= FS Jelgava =

- Full name: Futbola skola Jelgava (Football school Jelgava)
- Founded: 4 April 2017; 9 years ago
- Ground: Zemgale Olympic Center
- Capacity: 1,560
- Manager: (Latvia) Valērijs Redjko
- League: Virslīga
- 2024: Virslīga, 10th of 10
- Website: www.fsjelgava.lv
Home colours	Away colours

FS Jelgava, previous name Albatroz SC, is a Latvian football club that is based in Jelgava. Founded in 2017, it is the phoenix club of FK Jelgava, taking its place in the Latvian Higher League (Virslīga).

In the 2024 Latvian Higher League season, FS Jelgava ended up at the bottom of the table, but escaped relegation due to the denial of a Virslīga licence to Valmiera FC for the 2025 season.

== Current squad ==
As of 5 September, 2026

Note: Flags indicate national team as defined under FIFA eligibility rules; some limited exceptions apply. Players may hold more than one non-FIFA nationality.

No.	Pos.	Nation	Player
1	GK	CZE	Adam Dvořák
3	DF	LAT	Maksims Semeško (on loan from Riga)
4	DF	LAT	Alans Kangars
5	DF	LAT	Ivans Smirnovs
7	FW	LAT	Artūrs Janovskis
8	MF	LAT	Roberts Meļķis
9	FW	LAT	Rihards Bečers
11	MF	CZE	Martin Hašek
13	DF	LAT	Jegors Novikovs
16	GK	LAT	Toms Leitis
17	FW	CZE	Tomáš Rataj
18	FW	LAT	Emīls Šmaukstelis

No.	Pos.	Nation	Player
19	DF	LAT	Armands Pētersons
20	FW	LAT	Gļebs Patika
21	DF	LAT	Gļebs Kačanovs
22	MF	CZE	Miloš Pudil
23	MF	LAT	Ādams Dreimanis
24	MF	CZE	Filip Hašek
26	DF	LAT	Aleksandrs Butovskis
27	DF	LAT	Kristers Alekseičiks
28	MF	LAT	Andris Deklavs
29	MF	LAT	Gļebs Žaleiko
30	GK	SVK	Samuel Belanik
-	MF	LAT	Kristofers Rekis

=== Out on loan ===
Note: Flags indicate national team as defined under FIFA eligibility rules; some limited exceptions apply. Players may hold more than one non-FIFA nationality.

No.	Pos.	Nation	Player
-	MF	NGR	Victor Promise (at SK Super Nova 31 December 2026)
-	MF	GAM	Muhammed Hydara (at Tartu JK Tammeka until 31 December 2026)

No.	Pos.	Nation	Player
-	FW	NGR	Kingsley Emenike (at RFS 31 December 2026)
-	FW	LAT	Rūdolfs Laķis (at FK Smiltene/BJSS until 31 December 2026)
