= Martin Hašek (footballer, born 1995) =

Czech footballer (born 1995)

Personal information
- Date of birth: 3 October 1995 (age 31)
- Place of birth: Liberec, Czech Republic
- Height: 1.81 m (5 ft 11 in)
- Position: Midfielder

Team information
- Current team: Jelgava
- Number: 11

Youth career
- 2005–2006: Liberec
- 2006–2014: Sparta Prague

Senior career*
Years	Team	Apps	(Gls)
2014–2016	Sparta Prague	0	(0)
2014	→ Pardubice (loan)	15	(2)
2015	→ Viktoria Žižkov (loan)	2	(0)
2015–2016	→ Vlašim (loan)	8	(0)
2016–2017	→ Bohemians 1905 (loan)	22	(2)
2017–2018	Bohemians 1905	42	(6)
2019–2020	Sparta Prague	30	(6)
2020	Sparta Prague B	0	(0)
2021	Würzburger Kickers	13	(1)
2021–2023	Erzurumspor	45	(6)
2023	Wisła Płock	3	(0)
2023–2025	Makedonikos	36	(2)
2025–	Jelgava	33	(6)

International career
2012	Czech Republic U17	2	(0)
2014	Czech Republic U20	2	(0)
2016–2017	Czech Republic U21	6	(2)
- * Club domestic league appearances and goals as of 12 November 2026

Martin Hašek (born 3 October 1995) is a Czech professional footballer who plays as a midfielder for Latvian Higher League club Jelgava.

== Career ==
He made his senior league debut for Pardubice on 2 August 2014 in a Czech National Football League 1–1 home draw against Vlašim. He scored his first goal on 13 November in a 1–0 home win against Frýdek-Místek. In July 2017, he moved to Bohemians 1905 after being there on loan the last season. Sparta secured a buy-back option.

On 28 December 2018, Hašek signed a two-and-a-half-year contract with Sparta Prague. On 27 January 2020, Hašek refused to travel with the first team to the training camp in Spain. In February, he was moved to reserve team. On 12 March 2020, Hašek delivered unilateral termination of the professional contract to the club. On 23 October 2020, the Board of Arbitrators of the FAČR decided that Hašek must pay EUR 800,000 to Sparta, as they examined the termination of the professional contract by Hašek as unjustified. On 28 November 2022, CAS upheld the previous verdict, but reduced the fine to an amount exceeding EUR 94,000 (CZK 2,250,000) + 10 percent per year as interest on late payment.

On 5 January 2021, after almost ten months without a club, Hašek signed a contract with a team sitting on the bottom of the 2. Bundesliga table, Würzburger Kickers.

On 3 September 2021, Hašek signed a contract with Turkish TFF First League side Erzurumspor F.K.

On 28 February 2023, Hašek signed a half-year contract with Polish Ekstraklasa side Wisła Płock.

On 28 September 2023, Hašek signed a one-year contract with Greek Super League Greece 2 side Makedonikos.

On 2 July 2025, Hašek signed a contract with Latvian Higher League club Jelgava as a free agent.

== Personal life ==
He is the son of the Czech international footballer of the same name, and the nephew of former ice hockey goalkeeper Dominik Hašek.
