= Filip Hašek =

Czech footballer (born 1997)

Personal information
- Date of birth: 20 March 1997 (age 29)
- Place of birth: Czech Republic
- Height: 1.68 m (5 ft 6 in)
- Position: Midfielder

Team information
- Current team: Jelgava
- Number: 24

Youth career
- –2012: Liberec
- 2012–2016: Sparta Prague

Senior career*
Years	Team	Apps	(Gls)
2016–2018	Sparta Prague U21		
2016–2017	→ Sellier & Bellot Vlašim (loan)	40	(6)
2018	→ Dynamo České Budějovice (loan)	13	(3)
2018–2021	Bohemians 1905	27	(1)
2019	→ Ružomberok (loan)	3	(0)
2019–2020	→ Dukla Prague (loan)	14	(3)
2021	Olympiacos Volos	2	(0)
2022	Pohronie	8	(0)
2022–2023	VfB Krieschow	24	(12)
2023–2024	SpVgg Bayern Hof	19	(3)
2025–	Jelgava	46	(13)

International career
2015	Czech Republic U17	2	(0)
2018	Czech Republic U19	6	(1)
- * Club domestic league appearances and goals as of 12 November 2026

Filip Hašek (born 20 March 1997) is a Czech professional footballer who plays as a midfielder for Latvian Higher League club Jelgava.

== Club career ==
Hašek made his professional debut for Bohemians 1905 against Slovácko on 22 July 2018.
