= List of Latvian football transfers winter 2021–22 =

This is a list of Latvian football transfers in the winter transfer window 2021 by club. Only clubs of the 2022 Latvian Higher League are included.

== Latvian Higher League ==
=== RFS ===
In: Note: Flags indicate national team as defined under FIFA eligibility rules; some limited exceptions apply. Players may hold more than one non-FIFA nationality.

No.	Pos.	Nation	Player
—	GK	LVA	Jevgēņijs Ņerugals (from Spartaks Jūrmala)
—	GK	LVA	Valentins Ralkevičs (loan return from BFC Daugavpils)
—	DF	LVA	Vitālijs Maksimenko (Free agent)
—	DF	LVA	Vladislavs Fjodorovs (from Riga)
—	DF	LVA	Kaspars Dubra (from (Ukraine) Oleksandriya)
—	DF	LVA	Jānis Krautmanis (from SK Super Nova)
—	MF	LTU	Karolis Uzėla (from (Lithuania) FK Žalgiris)
—	MF	RUS	Vladislav Galkin (on loan from (Russia) Dynamo Moscow)
—	FW	LVA	Valerijs Lizunovs (from BFC Daugavpils later loaned to BFC Daugavpils)
—	FW	BLR	Aleksandr Shestyuk (on loan from (Russia) Nizhny Novgorod)

Out: Note: Flags indicate national team as defined under FIFA eligibility rules; some limited exceptions apply. Players may hold more than one non-FIFA nationality.

No.	Pos.	Nation	Player
—	GK	LVA	Sergejs Vilkovs (on loan to Tukums 2000)
—	DF	LVA	Roberts Savaļnieks (to Liepāja)
—	DF	EST	Artur Pikk (to (Estonia) FCI Levadia)
—	DF	LVA	Aleksandrs Solovjovs (to FK Auda)
—	DF	LVA	Niks Sliede (on loan to Tukums 2000)
—	MF	MKD	Darko Micevski (from (North Macedonia) Vardar)
—	MF	ARG	Leonel Strumia (to Liepāja)
—	MF	AUT	Tomáš Šimkovič (to (Austria) First Vienna)
—	MF	BRA	Lucas Villela (to Liepāja)
—	FW	LVA	Marko Regža (to SK Super Nova)
—	FW	LVA	Valerijs Lizunovs (on loan to BFC Daugavpils)

=== Valmiera FC ===
In: Note: Flags indicate national team as defined under FIFA eligibility rules; some limited exceptions apply. Players may hold more than one non-FIFA nationality.

No.	Pos.	Nation	Player
—	GK	LVA	Klāvs Lauva (from Albatroz/Jelgava)
—	DF	LVA	Roberts Veips (from FK Auda)
—	DF	LVA	Emīls Birka (from Metta/LU)
—	MF	LVA	Oļģerts Raščevskis (from BFC Daugavpils)
—	MF	LVA	Artjoms Šaboha (from Albatroz/Jelgava)
—	MF	LVA	Kristers Čudars (from Metta/LU)
—	MF	LVA	Kristers Penkevics (from Tukums 2000)
—	MF	UKR	Ivan Zhelizko (from (Czech Republic) MFK Karviná, previously on loan)
—	FW	LVA	Kristiāns Kaušelis (from BFC Daugavpils)
—	FW	LVA	Kristers Lūsiņš (loan return from Metta/LU)
—	FW	LVA	Kristiāns Kaušelis (from BFC Daugavpils)
—	FW	UGA	Derrick Kakooza (from (Uganda) Police FC)

Out: Note: Flags indicate national team as defined under FIFA eligibility rules; some limited exceptions apply. Players may hold more than one non-FIFA nationality.

No.	Pos.	Nation	Player
—	DF	GEO	Luka Gadrani (to (Kazakhstan) FC Taraz)
—	DF	RUS	Viktor Aleksandrov (loan return to (Russia) Rubin Kazan)
—	MF	POR	Jorge Teixeira (on loan to (Portugal) Covilhã)
—	MF	LVA	Rūdolfs Zeņģis (on loan to Metta/LU)
—	MF	LVA	Vladimirs Stepanovs (on loan to SK Super Nova)
—	MF	JPN	Ryuga Nakamura (on loan to Tukums 2000)
—	FW	SEN	Ibrahima Ndiape Sow (on loan to Tukums 2000)
—	FW	LVA	Ingars Pūlis (on loan to Metta/LU)
—	FW	LVA	Ēriks Punculs (on loan to Liepāja)

=== Liepāja ===
In: Note: Flags indicate national team as defined under FIFA eligibility rules; some limited exceptions apply. Players may hold more than one non-FIFA nationality.

No.	Pos.	Nation	Player
—	DF	LVA	Roberts Savaļnieks (from RFS)
—	DF	URU	Martin Marta (from (Uruguay) Progreso)
—	MF	BRA	Lucas Villela (from RFS)
—	MF	ARG	Leonel Strumia (from RFS)
—	MF	SRB	Nemanja Belaković (from (Austria) Hartberg)
—	FW	LVA	Artūrs Karašausks (from (Cyprus) Ethnikos Achna)
—	FW	LVA	Ēriks Punculs (on loan from Valmiera FC)

Out: Note: Flags indicate national team as defined under FIFA eligibility rules; some limited exceptions apply. Players may hold more than one non-FIFA nationality.

No.	Pos.	Nation	Player
—	GK	LVA	Kaspars Ikstens (Released)
—	DF	LVA	Vadims Žuļevs (Released)
—	DF	BLR	Aleh Veratsila (to (Belarus) Vitebsk)
—	DF	SRB	Milan Lazarevic (to (Serbia) Vojvodina)
—	DF	SRB	Miloš Ostojić (to (Serbia) Spartak)
—	MF	BLR	Dzmitry Baha (Released)
—	MF	BLR	Evgeni Berezkin (to (Belarus) Torpedo Zhodino)
—	MF	LVA	Kristians Toress (Retired)
—	MF	LVA	Ingars Sarmis Stuglis (to Tukums 2000)
—	FW	LVA	Valērijs Šabala (to (Faroe Islands) KÍ)
—	FW	BLR	Mikhail Gordeichuk (Released)
—	FW	SRB	Milan Mirosavljev (to (Albania) Partizani)

=== Riga ===
In: Note: Flags indicate national team as defined under FIFA eligibility rules; some limited exceptions apply. Players may hold more than one non-FIFA nationality.

No.	Pos.	Nation	Player
—	GK	LVA	Frenks Orols (loan return from BFC Daugavpils, later loaned to FK Auda)
—	GK	LVA	Iļja Isajevs (loan return from FK Auda)
—	GK	CMR	Fabrice Ondoa (from (Croatia) Istra 1961, later loaned to FK Auda)
—	DF	LVA	Raivis Jurkovskis (from (Republic of Ireland) Dundalk)
—	DF	GHA	Baba Musah (from Metta/LU)
—	DF	AUT	Christoph Martschinko (from Austria Wien)
—	DF	GRE	Thanos Petsos (from (Austria) WSG Tirol)
—	DF	LVA	Iļja Korotkovs (from Metta/LU, loaned to FK Auda)
—	MF	GHA	Joselpho Barnes (from (Belgium) Excelsior Virton)
—	MF	UKR	Vladlen Yurchenko (from (Ukraine) Desna Chernihiv)
—	MF	BLR	Yury Kendysh (from (Belarus) Shakhtyor Soligorsk)
—	MF	BRA	Lipe Veloso (loan return from (Belarus) Torpedo Zhodino)
—	FW	UKR	Oleksandr Filippov (on loan from (Belgium) Sint-Truiden)
—	FW	BUL	Georgi Minchev (from (Bulgaria) Lokomotiv Plovdiv)

Out: Note: Flags indicate national team as defined under FIFA eligibility rules; some limited exceptions apply. Players may hold more than one non-FIFA nationality.

No.	Pos.	Nation	Player
—	GK	CRO	Ivan Brkić (to (Azerbaijan) Neftci)
—	GK	LVA	Frenks Orols (on loan to FK Auda, previously on loan at BFC Daugavpils)
—	GK	CMR	Fabrice Ondoa (on loan to FK Auda)
—	DF	COL	Camilo Saiz (Released)
—	DF	LVA	Vladislavs Fjodorovs (to RFS)
—	DF	ISL	Axel Óskar Andrésson (Released)
—	DF	LVA	Iļja Korotkovs (on loan to FK Auda)
—	MF	LVA	Oļegs Laizāns (to Spartaks Jūrmala)
—	MF	BRA	Felipe Brisola (Released)
—	MF	RUS	Danila Yanov (on loan to (Russia) Forte Taganrog)
—	MF	SRB	Marko Đurišić (Released)
—	MF	BRA	Lipe Veloso (to (Belarus) Torpedo Zhodino, previously on loan)
—	MF	SRB	Nedeljko Piščević (to (Serbia) Radnički Kragujevac)
—	MF	KOS	Besar Halimi (Released)
—	MF	CRO	Ivan Paurević (Released)
—	MF	LVA	Arturs Krancmanis (on loan to FK Auda)
—	MF	LVA	Aleksejs Saveļjevs (on loan to FK Auda)
—	FW	NGA	Yunusa Owolabi Muritala (loan return to Metta/LU)
—	FW	RUS	Stanislav Krapukhin (on loan to FK Auda)

=== Spartaks Jūrmala ===
In: Note: Flags indicate national team as defined under FIFA eligibility rules; some limited exceptions apply. Players may hold more than one non-FIFA nationality.

No.	Pos.	Nation	Player
—	DF	LVA	Mārcis Ošs (loan return from (Switzerland) Lausanne)
—	DF	LVA	Daniels Grauds (from Albatroz/Jelgava)
—	MF	LVA	Daņila Patijčuks (from Albatroz/Jelgava)
—	MF	LVA	Oļegs Laizāns (from Riga FC)
—	MF	CRO	Tin Vukmanić (from (Belarus) Shakhtyor Soligorsk)

Out: Note: Flags indicate national team as defined under FIFA eligibility rules; some limited exceptions apply. Players may hold more than one non-FIFA nationality.

No.	Pos.	Nation	Player
—	GK	LVA	Jevgēņijs Ņerugals (to RFS)
—	DF	NGA	Lucky Opara (on loan to (Estonia) Narva Trans)
—	DF	LVA	Markuss Kruglaužs (to Tukums 2000)
—	MF	MDA	Cristian Dros (to (Belarus) Slavia Mozyr, previously on loan))
—	MF	FIN	Adam Markhiyev (on loan to (Italy) SPAL)
—	MF	ALG	Heythem Kerbache (on loan to (Italy) AC Siena)
—	MF	FIN	Sergei Eremenko (on loan to (Finland) HIFK)
—	FW	NCA	Ariagner Smith (on loan to (Lithuania) FK Panevėžys)

=== BFC Daugavpils ===
In: Note: Flags indicate national team as defined under FIFA eligibility rules; some limited exceptions apply. Players may hold more than one non-FIFA nationality.

No.	Pos.	Nation	Player
—	MF	LVA	Ritus Krjauklis (from (China) Nanjing City)
—	MF	VEN	Johao Martinez (from (Panama) Atlético Chiriqui)
—	MF	AZE	Asim Alizada (from (Azerbaijan) Neftci)
—	FW	LVA	Valerijs Lizunovs (on loan from RFS)

Out: Note: Flags indicate national team as defined under FIFA eligibility rules; some limited exceptions apply. Players may hold more than one non-FIFA nationality.

No.	Pos.	Nation	Player
—	GK	LVA	Frenks Orols (loan return to Riga FC, later loaned to FK Auda)
—	GK	LVA	Valentins Ralkevičs (loan return to RFS)
—	DF	NGA	Joshua Akpudje (on loan to (Lithuania) FK Panevėžys)
—	MF	LVA	Oļģerts Raščevskis (to Valmiera FC)
—	FW	LVA	Valerijs Lizunovs (to RFS)
—	FW	LVA	Kristiāns Kaušelis (to Valmiera FC)

=== Metta/LU ===
In: Note: Flags indicate national team as defined under FIFA eligibility rules; some limited exceptions apply. Players may hold more than one non-FIFA nationality.

No.	Pos.	Nation	Player
—	GK	LVA	Alvis Sorokins (from SK Krimulda)
—	MF	LVA	Rūdolfs Zeņģis (on loan from Valmiera FC)
—	FW	NGA	Yunusa Owolabi Muritala (loan return from Riga)
—	FW	LVA	Ingars Pūlis (on loan from Valmiera FC)

Out: Note: Flags indicate national team as defined under FIFA eligibility rules; some limited exceptions apply. Players may hold more than one non-FIFA nationality.

No.	Pos.	Nation	Player
—	DF	GHA	Baba Musah (to Riga)
—	DF	LVA	Iļja Korotkovs (to Riga)
—	DF	LVA	Emīls Birka (to Valmiera FC)
—	MF	LVA	Rihards Ozoliņš (to SK Super Nova)
—	MF	LVA	Roberts Ķipsts (Released)
—	MF	LVA	Dmitrijs Zelenkovs (to (Italy) Montespaccato Savoia Calcio)
—	MF	LVA	Kristers Čudars (to Valmiera FC)
—	FW	JPN	Ikuto Gomi (to Tukums 2000)
—	FW	LVA	Kristers Lūsiņš (loan return to Valmiera FC)

=== FK Auda ===
In: Note: Flags indicate national team as defined under FIFA eligibility rules; some limited exceptions apply. Players may hold more than one non-FIFA nationality.

No.	Pos.	Nation	Player
—	GK	LVA	Frenks Orols (on loan from Riga FC, previously on loan at BFC Daugavpils)
—	GK	CMR	Fabrice Ondoa (on loan from Riga FC)
—	DF	LVA	Aleksandrs Solovjovs (from RFS)
—	DF	CRO	Marko Stolnik (on loan from (Croatia) Varaždin)
—	DF	CRO	Božo Mikulić (from (Italy) ACR Messina)
—	DF	LVA	Rendijs Šibass (from (Sweden) Dalkurd FF)
—	DF	LVA	Iļja Korotkovs (on loan from Riga FC)
—	DF	BRA	João Menezess (on loan from (Brazil) Vasco da Gama)
—	MF	LVA	Arturs Krancmanis (on loan from Riga FC)
—	MF	LVA	Aleksejs Saveļjevs (on loan from Riga FC)
—	MF	SSD	Manyumow Achol (from (New Zealand) Wellington Phoenix Reserves)
—	FW	RUS	Stanislav Krapukhin (on loan from Riga FC)
—	FW	CRO	Tomislav Štrkalj (on loan from (Portugal) Tondela, previously on loan (Croatia) Hrvatski Dragovoljac)
—	FW	FRA	Brice Tutu (from (France) Caen)

Out: Note: Flags indicate national team as defined under FIFA eligibility rules; some limited exceptions apply. Players may hold more than one non-FIFA nationality.

No.	Pos.	Nation	Player
—	GK	LVA	Iļja Isajevs (loan return to Riga FC)
—	DF	LVA	Roberts Veips (to Valmiera FC)
—	DF	LVA	Roberts Jaunarājs-Janvāris (to SK Super Nova)
—	DF	LVA	Ņikita Skļarenko (to SK Super Nova)
—	MF	LVA	Maksims Sidorovs (to SK Super Nova)
—	FW	LVA	Aleksejs Davidenkovs (to Tukums 2000)

=== FK Tukums 2000 ===
In: Note: Flags indicate national team as defined under FIFA eligibility rules; some limited exceptions apply. Players may hold more than one non-FIFA nationality.

No.	Pos.	Nation	Player
—	GK	LVA	Sergejs Vilkovs (on loan from RFS)
—	DF	LVA	Niks Sliede (on loan from RFS)
—	DF	LVA	Markuss Kruglaužs (from Spartaks Jūrmala)
—	MF	JPN	Ryuga Nakamura (on loan from Valmiera FC)
—	MF	LVA	Ingars Sarmis Stuglis (from Liepāja)
—	FW	JPN	Ikuto Gomi (from Metta/LU)
—	FW	SEN	Ibrahima Ndiape Sow (on loan from Valmiera FC)
—	FW	LVA	Oskars Rubenis (from FC Caramba Rīga)
—	FW	LVA	Aleksejs Davidenkovs (from FK Auda)

Out: Note: Flags indicate national team as defined under FIFA eligibility rules; some limited exceptions apply. Players may hold more than one non-FIFA nationality.

No.	Pos.	Nation	Player
—	MF	LVA	Kristers Penkevics (to Valmiera FC)

=== SK Super Nova ===
In: Note: Flags indicate national team as defined under FIFA eligibility rules; some limited exceptions apply. Players may hold more than one non-FIFA nationality.

No.	Pos.	Nation	Player
—	GK	LVA	Kristaps Zommers (Free agent)
—	DF	LVA	Roberts Jaunarājs-Janvāris (from FK Auda)
—	DF	LVA	Ņikita Skļarenko (from FK Auda)
—	MF	LVA	Rihards Ozoliņš (from Metta/LU)
—	MF	LVA	Ričards Rullis (from FK Smiltene)
—	MF	LVA	Maksims Sidorovs (from FK Auda)
—	MF	LVA	Vladimirs Stepanovs (on loan from Valmiera FC)
—	MF	LVA	Alekss Regža (from FK Dinamo Rīga)
—	FW	AZE	Vugar Asgarov (from FK Salaspils)
—	FW	LVA	Marko Regža (from RFS)

Out: Note: Flags indicate national team as defined under FIFA eligibility rules; some limited exceptions apply. Players may hold more than one non-FIFA nationality.

No.	Pos.	Nation	Player
—	DF	LVA	Jānis Krautmanis (to RFS)
—	DF	LVA	Toms Aizgrāvis (Retired)
