= List of Latvian football transfers summer 2012 =

This is a list of Latvian football transfers in the 2012 summer transfer window by club. Only transfers of the Virsliga and 1. līga are included.

All transfers mentioned are shown in the external links at the bottom of the page. If you wish to insert a transfer that isn't mentioned there, please add a reference.

== Latvian Higher League ==
=== Ventspils ===
In: Note: Flags indicate national team as defined under FIFA eligibility rules; some limited exceptions apply. Players may hold more than one non-FIFA nationality.

| No. | Pos. | Nation | Player |
|---|---|---|---|
| 2 | DF | (Latvia) LVA | Kaspars Dubra (from (Poland) Polonia Bytom) |
| 9 | FW | (Latvia) LVA | Vladislavs Kozlovs (from Jelgava) |
| 10 | MF | (Latvia) LVA | Jurijs Žigajevs (from (Poland) Widzew Łódź) |
| 15 | MF | (Latvia) LVA | Oļegs Žatkins (loan return from Jelgava) |
| 19 | FW | (Japan) JPN | Yōsuke Saito (from Gulbene) |
| 21 | MF | (Lithuania) LTU | Simonas Paulius (from (Lithuania) Dainava Alytus) |
| 25 | MF | (Latvia) LVA | Igors Tarasovs (from (Azerbaijan) Simurq) |
| 30 | GK | (Latvia) LVA | Maksims Uvarenko (from (Czech Republic) Vysočina Jihlava) |
| — | MF | (Latvia) LVA | Jevgēņijs Kosmačovs (loan return from (Ukraine) Sevastopol) |

Out: Note: Flags indicate national team as defined under FIFA eligibility rules; some limited exceptions apply. Players may hold more than one non-FIFA nationality.

| No. | Pos. | Nation | Player |
|---|---|---|---|
| 1 | GK | (Latvia) LVA | Aleksandrs Vlasovs (to Spartaks) |
| 9 | FW | (Latvia) LVA | Eduards Višņakovs (to (Kazakhstan) Shakhter Karagandy) |
| 10 | MF | (Moldova) MDA | Igor Ţîgîrlaş (loan return to (Ukraine) Chornomorets Odesa) |
| 14 | FW | (Latvia) LVA | Pāvels Hohlovs (to Jelgava) |
| 21 | MF | (Latvia) LVA | Romāns Bespalovs (on loan to Jelgava) |
| 25 | MF | (Nigeria) NGA | Michael Tukura (to (Romania) Vaslui) |
| 33 | FW | (Latvia) LVA | Kaspars Svārups (on loan to (Russia) Rubin Kazan) |
| — | MF | (Latvia) LVA | Jevgēņijs Kosmačovs (to (Belarus) Shakhtyor Soligorsk) |

=== Liepājas Metalurgs ===
In: Note: Flags indicate national team as defined under FIFA eligibility rules; some limited exceptions apply. Players may hold more than one non-FIFA nationality.

| No. | Pos. | Nation | Player |
|---|---|---|---|
| 2 | DF | (Latvia) LVA | Reinis Flaksis (from Liepājas Metalurgs-2) |
| 6 | DF | (Latvia) LVA | Juris Kučma (from Liepājas Metalurgs-2) |
| 10 | MF | (Lithuania) LTU | Rytis Leliūga (from (Norway) Gjøvik FF) |
| 12 | GK | (Latvia) LVA | Pāvels Doroševs (from (Azerbaijan) Gabala) |
| 14 | MF | (Latvia) LVA | Iļja Šadčins (from Liepājas Metalurgs-2) |
| 15 | FW | (Latvia) LVA | Ģirts Karlsons (from (Azerbaijan) Inter Baku) |
| 25 | FW | (Lithuania) LTU | Lukas Kochanauskas (from (Lithuania) Dainava Alytus) |
| 28 | DF | (Latvia) LVA | Toms Mežs (loan return from Daugava Riga) |
| 87 | FW | (Latvia) LVA | Dāvis Ikaunieks (from Liepājas Metalurgs-2) |

Out: Note: Flags indicate national team as defined under FIFA eligibility rules; some limited exceptions apply. Players may hold more than one non-FIFA nationality.

| No. | Pos. | Nation | Player |
|---|---|---|---|
| 3 | DF | (Latvia) LVA | Oskars Kļava (to (Azerbaijan) AZAL) |
| 6 | MF | (Latvia) LVA | Jevgēņijs Golovins (to Spartaks) |
| 14 | FW | (Latvia) LVA | Ēriks Punculs (to (Spain) Unión Polideportiva Plasencia) |
| 21 | GK | (Latvia) LVA | Pāvels Šteinbors (to (South Africa) Golden Arrows) |
| 87 | DF | (Latvia) LVA | Ritus Krjauklis (to (South Africa) Golden Arrows) |

=== Daugava Daugavpils ===
In: Note: Flags indicate national team as defined under FIFA eligibility rules; some limited exceptions apply. Players may hold more than one non-FIFA nationality.

| No. | Pos. | Nation | Player |
|---|---|---|---|
| 5 | MF | (Moldova) MDA | Andrei Tcaciuc (on loan from (Moldova) Zimbru Chişinău) |
| 8 | FW | (Nigeria) NGA | Stanley Ibe (from (Czech Republic) Bohemians Prague) |
| 13 | DF | (Nigeria) NGA | Daniel Ola (on loan from Jūrmala) |
| 19 | DF | (Latvia) LVA | Dmitrijs Halvitovs (from Jūrmala) |
| 36 | MF | (Latvia) LVA | Jans Radevičs (loan return from Ilūkste) |
| 81 | GK | (Latvia) LVA | Jevgēņijs Ņerugals (loan return from Ilūkste) |

Out: Note: Flags indicate national team as defined under FIFA eligibility rules; some limited exceptions apply. Players may hold more than one non-FIFA nationality.

| No. | Pos. | Nation | Player |
|---|---|---|---|
| 1 | GK | (Latvia) LVA | Igors Serkovs (on loan to Ilūkste) |
| 7 | MF | (Russia) RUS | Andrei Streltsov (released) |
| 20 | FW | (Latvia) LVA | Ričards Raščevskis (on loan to Ilūkste) |
| 30 | MF | (Latvia) LVA | Vadims Logins (to (Germany) BSV Schwarz-Weiß Rehden) |
| 39 | MF | (Russia) RUS | Yuri Mamaev (to (Russia) Luch-Energiya Vladivostok) |

=== Skonto ===
In: Note: Flags indicate national team as defined under FIFA eligibility rules; some limited exceptions apply. Players may hold more than one non-FIFA nationality.

| No. | Pos. | Nation | Player |
|---|---|---|---|
| 5 | MF | (Latvia) LVA | Juris Laizāns (from (Russia) Fakel Voronezh) |
| 22 | MF | (Latvia) LVA | Ritvars Rugins (from (Ukraine) Illichivets Mariupol) |

Out: Note: Flags indicate national team as defined under FIFA eligibility rules; some limited exceptions apply. Players may hold more than one non-FIFA nationality.

| No. | Pos. | Nation | Player |
|---|---|---|---|
| 22 | MF | (Latvia) LVA | Nikolajs Zaicevs (on loan to (Estonia) Narva Trans) |
| 27 | FW | (Latvia) LVA | Artūrs Karašausks (on loan to Gulbene) |

=== Jūrmala ===
In: Note: Flags indicate national team as defined under FIFA eligibility rules; some limited exceptions apply. Players may hold more than one non-FIFA nationality.

| No. | Pos. | Nation | Player |
|---|---|---|---|
| 11 | FW | (Russia) RUS | Vyacheslav Seletskiy (unattached) |
| 12 | DF | (Latvia) LVA | Deniss Kačanovs (from (Indonesia) Persema Malang) |
| 28 | FW | (Russia) RUS | Mikhail Mysin (from (Russia) SKA-Energiya Khabarovsk) |
| 69 | MF | (Latvia) LVA | Aleksandrs Solovjovs (from (Lithuania) Tauras Tauragė) |

Out: Note: Flags indicate national team as defined under FIFA eligibility rules; some limited exceptions apply. Players may hold more than one non-FIFA nationality.

| No. | Pos. | Nation | Player |
|---|---|---|---|
| 11 | MF | (Russia) RUS | Igor Byrlov (to (Russia) Chernomorets Novorossiysk) |
| 12 | MF | (Latvia) LVA | Deniss Ostrovskis (to Gulbene) |
| 13 | DF | (Latvia) LVA | Dmitrijs Halvitovs (to Daugava Daugavpils) |
| 23 | MF | (Latvia) LVA | Artūrs Burņins (to Rīgas Futbola skola) |
| 24 | MF | (Latvia) LVA | Kirils Grigorovs (to Gulbene) |
| 28 | DF | (Nigeria) NGA | Daniel Ola (on loan to Daugava Daugavpils) |
| 77 | GK | (Latvia) LVA | Pāvels Davidovs (to (Lithuania) Sūduva Marijampolė) |

=== Jelgava ===
In: Note: Flags indicate national team as defined under FIFA eligibility rules; some limited exceptions apply. Players may hold more than one non-FIFA nationality.

| No. | Pos. | Nation | Player |
|---|---|---|---|
| 1 | GK | (Latvia) LVA | Jevgēņijs Sazonovs (from (Cyprus) Ethnikos Achna) |
| 10 | FW | (Latvia) LVA | Pāvels Hohlovs (from Ventspils) |
| 15 | MF | (Latvia) LVA | Nils Sitenkovs (from Gulbene) |
| 16 | GK | (Latvia) LVA | Dmitrijs Grigorjevs (on loan from (Sweden) Athletic) |
| 21 | FW | (France) FRA | Soumaïla Keita (from (France) Limoges) |
| 22 | MF | (Latvia) LVA | Igors Barinovs (on loan from Ventspils-2) |
| 27 | FW | (Nigeria) NGA | Okechukwu Junior (unattached) |
| 33 | FW | (Latvia) LVA | Oļegs Malašenoks (from (Russia) Volgar Astrakhan) |
| 34 | MF | (Ukraine) UKR | Serhiy Ilin (unattached) |
| 35 | MF | (Lithuania) LTU | Darius Jankauskas (from (Italy) Sambonifacese) |
| 37 | MF | (Latvia) LVA | Romāns Bespalovs (on loan from Ventspils) |

Out: Note: Flags indicate national team as defined under FIFA eligibility rules; some limited exceptions apply. Players may hold more than one non-FIFA nationality.

| No. | Pos. | Nation | Player |
|---|---|---|---|
| 4 | DF | (Latvia) LVA | Jevgēņijs Kazura (to (Estonia) Narva Trans) |
| 8 | MF | (Latvia) LVA | Artis Lazdiņš (to (Poland) Piast Gliwice) |
| 10 | MF | (Japan) JPN | Rei Ishikawa (to (Germany) Rot-Weiß Hadamar) |
| 15 | DF | (Latvia) LVA | Aleksandrs Baturinskis (to Daugava Riga) |
| 21 | FW | (Latvia) LVA | Vladislavs Kozlovs (to Ventspils) |
| 22 | MF | (Latvia) LVA | Oļegs Žatkins (loan return to Ventspils) |
| 81 | GK | (Latvia) LVA | Marks Bogdanovs (released) |

=== Gulbene ===
In: Note: Flags indicate national team as defined under FIFA eligibility rules; some limited exceptions apply. Players may hold more than one non-FIFA nationality.

| No. | Pos. | Nation | Player |
|---|---|---|---|
| 8 | MF | (Latvia) LVA | Kirils Grigorovs (from Jūrmala) |
| 9 | FW | (Japan) JPN | Ryuki Kozawa (from (Thailand) Pattaya United) |
| 10 | FW | (Japan) JPN | Hideaki Takeda (from (Estonia) Nõmme Kalju) |
| 11 | FW | (Latvia) LVA | Artūrs Karašausks (on loan from Skonto) |
| 12 | MF | (Latvia) LVA | Deniss Ostrovskis (from Jūrmala) |
| 14 | FW | (Japan) JPN | Shoma Akuta (from (Netherlands) ESA Rijkerswoerd) |
| 15 | MF | (Georgia (country)) GEO | David Tsiskarishvili (unattached) |
| 19 | DF | (Latvia) LVA | Edijs Ivaško (from Rīgas Futbola skola) |
| 20 | DF | (Poland) POL | Damian Kostowski (from (Poland) Lechia Gdańsk II) |
| 22 | GK | (Latvia) LVA | Oskars Gailītis (from Gulbene-2) |
| 25 | MF | (Latvia) LVA | Kaspars Brezinskis (from Gulbene-2) |

Out: Note: Flags indicate national team as defined under FIFA eligibility rules; some limited exceptions apply. Players may hold more than one non-FIFA nationality.

| No. | Pos. | Nation | Player |
|---|---|---|---|
| 8 | MF | (South Korea) KOR | Seung Ki Yoo (released) |
| 9 | FW | (Japan) JPN | Yōsuke Saito (to Ventspils) |
| 10 | MF | (Japan) JPN | Toshikazu Irie (to (Poland) Górnik Łęczna) |
| 12 | DF | (Japan) JPN | Shouhei Tsuchiya (to (Poland) Arkonia Szczecin) |
| 15 | MF | (Latvia) LVA | Nils Sitenkovs (to Jelgava) |
| 20 | MF | (Georgia (country)) GEO | Lado Datunashvili (to (Georgia (country)) Zooveti) |

=== Daugava Riga ===
In: Note: Flags indicate national team as defined under FIFA eligibility rules; some limited exceptions apply. Players may hold more than one non-FIFA nationality.

| No. | Pos. | Nation | Player |
|---|---|---|---|
| 4 | DF | (Ukraine) UKR | Oleg Solovich (from (Ukraine) Sevastopol-2) |
| 9 | MF | (Latvia) LVA | Gļebs Kļuškins (from Rīgas Futbola skola) |
| 10 | MF | (Latvia) LVA | Aleksandrs Gramovičs (from Spartaks) |
| 12 | MF | (Lithuania) LTU | Deividas Kapustas (from (Lithuania) Atlantas) |
| 16 | GK | (Latvia) LVA | Vitālijs Artjomenko (from (Cyprus) Kissos Kissonerga) |
| 19 | MF | (Ukraine) UKR | Andriy Zadoyko (from (Ukraine) Nyva Ternopil) |
| 22 | DF | (Latvia) LVA | Aleksandrs Baturinskis (from Jelgava) |
| 26 | MF | (Latvia) LVA | Vladislavs Pavļučenko (from (Poland) Polonia 1912 Leszno) |

Out: Note: Flags indicate national team as defined under FIFA eligibility rules; some limited exceptions apply. Players may hold more than one non-FIFA nationality.

| No. | Pos. | Nation | Player |
|---|---|---|---|
| 4 | DF | (Latvia) LVA | Toms Mežs (loan return to Liepājas Metalurgs) |
| 6 | DF | (Latvia) LVA | Ernests Pilats (to Rīgas Futbola skola) |
| 7 | MF | (Ukraine) UKR | Volodymir Melnyik (retired) |
| 9 | MF | (Latvia) LVA | Bogdans Petruks (loan return to Liepājas Metalurgs-2) |
| 10 | FW | (Russia) RUS | Aleksei Alekseyev (to (Russia) Spartak Shchyolkovo) |
| 17 | MF | (Latvia) LVA | Sandis Bokta (released) |
| 18 | MF | (Latvia) LVA | Aleksandrs Šumilovs (to Ilūkste) |
| — | MF | (Latvia) LVA | Igors Semjonovs (to Rīgas Futbola skola) |
| — | FW | (Latvia) LVA | Nikolajs Kozačuks (released) |

=== METTA/LU ===
In: Note: Flags indicate national team as defined under FIFA eligibility rules; some limited exceptions apply. Players may hold more than one non-FIFA nationality.

| No. | Pos. | Nation | Player |
|---|---|---|---|
| 18 | MF | (Latvia) LVA | Artjoms Lonščakovs (on loan from Skonto-2) |
| 25 | FW | (Latvia) LVA | Mareks Zuntners (from (Germany) FC Sylt) |

Out: Note: Flags indicate national team as defined under FIFA eligibility rules; some limited exceptions apply. Players may hold more than one non-FIFA nationality.

| No. | Pos. | Nation | Player |
|---|---|---|---|
| 18 | FW | (Latvia) LVA | Maksims Kamkins (to Rīgas Futbola skola) |

=== Spartaks ===
In: Note: Flags indicate national team as defined under FIFA eligibility rules; some limited exceptions apply. Players may hold more than one non-FIFA nationality.

| No. | Pos. | Nation | Player |
|---|---|---|---|
| 2 | MF | (Colombia) COL | Francisco Serna (from (Colombia) CD Gallegol) |
| 4 | MF | (Latvia) LVA | Daniils Ulimbaševs (from (Sweden) Väsby United) |
| 6 | MF | (Latvia) LVA | Jevgēņijs Golovins (from Liepājas Metalurgs) |
| 8 | MF | (Latvia) LVA | Deniels Calkovskis (from Ventspils-2) |
| 13 | MF | (Colombia) COL | Diego Agudelo (from (Colombia) Envigado) |
| 19 | MF | (Brazil) BRA | Alexsandro Araujo (from (Brazil) Atlético Monte Azul) |
| 24 | MF | (France) FRA | Vafoubge Dosso (from (France) Villemomble Sports) |
| 26 | FW | (Senegal) SEN | Moustapha Dabo (from (Switzerland) Aarau) |
| 37 | GK | (Latvia) LVA | Aleksandrs Vlasovs (from Ventspils) |
| 51 | MF | (Brazil) BRA | Geraldo Batista (from (Brazil) América) |
| — | DF | (Colombia) COL | Ezequiel Palomeque (loan return from (Czech Republic) Sigma Olomouc) |

Out: Note: Flags indicate national team as defined under FIFA eligibility rules; some limited exceptions apply. Players may hold more than one non-FIFA nationality.

| No. | Pos. | Nation | Player |
|---|---|---|---|
| 2 | DF | (Latvia) LVA | Edgars Pūliņš (to Spartaks-2) |
| 4 | DF | (Latvia) LVA | Maksims Lukaševičs (to Spartaks-2) |
| 4 | MF | (Colombia) COL | Carlos Rua (on loan to (Russia) Salyut Belgorod) |
| 8 | MF | (Latvia) LVA | Aleksandrs Gramovičs (to Daugava Riga) |
| 13 | MF | (Colombia) COL | Jairo Mosquera (on loan to (Russia) Salyut Belgorod) |
| 13 | FW | (Latvia) LVA | Aleksandrs Briļs (to Spartaks-2) |
| 18 | FW | (Ukraine) UKR | Yaroslav Sokol (released) |
| 24 | DF | (Latvia) LVA | Viktors Terentjevs (retired) |
| 26 | MF | (Italy) ITA | Andrea Casimirri (released) |
| 37 | GK | (Latvia) LVA | Pāvels Naglis (released) |
| — | DF | (Latvia) LVA | Dmitrijs Plukaitis (to Ilūkste) |
| — | FW | (Latvia) LVA | Artūrs Krasnočubs (to Spartaks-2) |
| — | DF | (Colombia) COL | Ezequiel Palomeque (to (Belarus) Gomel) |
| — | FW | (Colombia) COL | Daniel Buitrago (to (Russia) Spartak Nalchik, previously on loan) |

== Latvian First League ==
=== Skonto-2 ===
In: Note: Flags indicate national team as defined under FIFA eligibility rules; some limited exceptions apply. Players may hold more than one non-FIFA nationality.

| No. | Pos. | Nation | Player |

Out: Note: Flags indicate national team as defined under FIFA eligibility rules; some limited exceptions apply. Players may hold more than one non-FIFA nationality.

| No. | Pos. | Nation | Player |
|---|---|---|---|
| 14 | MF | (Latvia) LVA | Artjoms Lonščakovs (on loan to METTA/LU) |

=== Liepājas Metalurgs-2 ===
In: Note: Flags indicate national team as defined under FIFA eligibility rules; some limited exceptions apply. Players may hold more than one non-FIFA nationality.

| No. | Pos. | Nation | Player |
|---|---|---|---|
| 13 | MF | (Latvia) LVA | Bogdans Petruks (loan return from Daugava Riga) |

Out: Note: Flags indicate national team as defined under FIFA eligibility rules; some limited exceptions apply. Players may hold more than one non-FIFA nationality.

| No. | Pos. | Nation | Player |
|---|---|---|---|
| — | DF | (Latvia) LVA | Reinis Flaksis (to Liepājas Metalurgs) |
| — | MF | (Latvia) LVA | Juris Kučma (to Liepājas Metalurgs) |
| — | MF | (Latvia) LVA | Iļja Šadčins (to Liepājas Metalurgs) |
| — | FW | (Latvia) LVA | Dāvis Ikaunieks (to Liepājas Metalurgs) |

=== Rīgas Futbola skola ===
In: Note: Flags indicate national team as defined under FIFA eligibility rules; some limited exceptions apply. Players may hold more than one non-FIFA nationality.

| No. | Pos. | Nation | Player |
|---|---|---|---|
| 7 | FW | (Latvia) LVA | Juris Arhipovs-Prokofjevs (from reserves) |
| 13 | DF | (Latvia) LVA | Ernests Pilats (from Daugava Riga) |
| 14 | MF | (Latvia) LVA | Igors Semjonovs (from Daugava Riga) |
| 18 | FW | (Latvia) LVA | Sergejs Tjurikovs (unattached) |
| 19 | FW | (Latvia) LVA | Maksims Kamkins (from METTA/LU) |
| — | MF | (Latvia) LVA | Artūrs Burņins (from Jūrmala) |
| — | MF | (Latvia) LVA | Vladislavs Usevičs (from reserves) |
| — | | (Latvia) LVA | Romāns Tepo (unattached) |

Out: Note: Flags indicate national team as defined under FIFA eligibility rules; some limited exceptions apply. Players may hold more than one non-FIFA nationality.

| No. | Pos. | Nation | Player |
|---|---|---|---|
| 7 | MF | (Latvia) LVA | Gļebs Kļuškins (to Daugava Riga) |
| 18 | DF | (Latvia) LVA | Edijs Ivaško (to Gulbene) |

=== Varavīksne ===
In: Note: Flags indicate national team as defined under FIFA eligibility rules; some limited exceptions apply. Players may hold more than one non-FIFA nationality.

| No. | Pos. | Nation | Player |
|---|---|---|---|
| 7 | MF | (Latvia) LVA | Valentīns Doloka (from Liepājas Metalurgs reserves) |
| — | | (Latvia) LVA | Ēriks Putris (unattached) |

Out: Note: Flags indicate national team as defined under FIFA eligibility rules; some limited exceptions apply. Players may hold more than one non-FIFA nationality.

| No. | Pos. | Nation | Player |

=== Ventspils-2 ===
In: Note: Flags indicate national team as defined under FIFA eligibility rules; some limited exceptions apply. Players may hold more than one non-FIFA nationality.

| No. | Pos. | Nation | Player |

Out: Note: Flags indicate national team as defined under FIFA eligibility rules; some limited exceptions apply. Players may hold more than one non-FIFA nationality.

| No. | Pos. | Nation | Player |
|---|---|---|---|
| 9 | MF | (Latvia) LVA | Deniels Calkovskis (to Spartaks) |
| 23 | MF | (Latvia) LVA | Igors Barinovs (on loan to Jelgava) |
| — | MF | (Latvia) LVA | Andrejs Polovinkins (to Ilūkste) |

=== Rēzekne ===
In: Note: Flags indicate national team as defined under FIFA eligibility rules; some limited exceptions apply. Players may hold more than one non-FIFA nationality.

| No. | Pos. | Nation | Player |
|---|---|---|---|
| 7 | | (Latvia) LVA | Oļegs Mironovs (unattached) |
| 8 | MF | (Latvia) LVA | Dmitrijs Borisovs (from (Estonia) Narva Trans) |
| 10 | MF | (Latvia) LVA | Māris Rancāns (unattached) |
| 11 | FW | (Latvia) LVA | Andris Reiniks (unattached) |
| — | FW | (Latvia) LVA | Edvīns Savickis (from reserves) |
| — | MF | (Latvia) LVA | Raitis Tarasenko (from Preiļi) |
| — | | (Latvia) LVA | Aleksandrs Volkovs (from reserves) |
| — | DF | (Latvia) LVA | Vitālijs Zeltiņš (unattached) |

Out: Note: Flags indicate national team as defined under FIFA eligibility rules; some limited exceptions apply. Players may hold more than one non-FIFA nationality.

| No. | Pos. | Nation | Player |
|---|---|---|---|
| 29 | FW | (Latvia) LVA | Pavēls Tarasovs (to Daugava-2 Daugavpils) |

=== Daugava-2 Daugavpils ===
In: Note: Flags indicate national team as defined under FIFA eligibility rules; some limited exceptions apply. Players may hold more than one non-FIFA nationality.

| No. | Pos. | Nation | Player |

Out: Note: Flags indicate national team as defined under FIFA eligibility rules; some limited exceptions apply. Players may hold more than one non-FIFA nationality.

| No. | Pos. | Nation | Player |

=== Valmiera ===
In: Note: Flags indicate national team as defined under FIFA eligibility rules; some limited exceptions apply. Players may hold more than one non-FIFA nationality.

| No. | Pos. | Nation | Player |

Out: Note: Flags indicate national team as defined under FIFA eligibility rules; some limited exceptions apply. Players may hold more than one non-FIFA nationality.

| No. | Pos. | Nation | Player |

=== Auda ===
In: Note: Flags indicate national team as defined under FIFA eligibility rules; some limited exceptions apply. Players may hold more than one non-FIFA nationality.

| No. | Pos. | Nation | Player |
|---|---|---|---|
| 8 | MF | (Georgia (country)) GEO | Giorgi Okruashvili (from (Georgia (country)) Norchi Dinamoeli) |
| 13 | DF | (Georgia (country)) GEO | Tornike Chaduneli (unattached) |
| 22 | FW | (Georgia (country)) GEO | Koba Tortladze (unattached) |

Out: Note: Flags indicate national team as defined under FIFA eligibility rules; some limited exceptions apply. Players may hold more than one non-FIFA nationality.

| No. | Pos. | Nation | Player |

=== Tukums 2000 ===
In: Note: Flags indicate national team as defined under FIFA eligibility rules; some limited exceptions apply. Players may hold more than one non-FIFA nationality.

| No. | Pos. | Nation | Player |
|---|---|---|---|
| 25 | DF | (Latvia) LVA | Mihails Rjumšins (unattached) |
| — | DF | (Latvia) LVA | Aleksejs Dimčuks (unattached) |
| — | | (Latvia) LVA | Ernests Zīverts (unattached) |

Out: Note: Flags indicate national team as defined under FIFA eligibility rules; some limited exceptions apply. Players may hold more than one non-FIFA nationality.

| No. | Pos. | Nation | Player |

=== Jelgava-2 ===
In: Note: Flags indicate national team as defined under FIFA eligibility rules; some limited exceptions apply. Players may hold more than one non-FIFA nationality.

| No. | Pos. | Nation | Player |
|---|---|---|---|
| — | DF | (Latvia) LVA | Gatis Mašals (from reserves) |
| — | DF | (Latvia) LVA | Artis Staļģis (from reserves) |
| — | DF | (Latvia) LVA | Edvīns Bergmanis (from reserves) |
| — | | (Latvia) LVA | Vadims Avdejevs (from reserves) |

Out: Note: Flags indicate national team as defined under FIFA eligibility rules; some limited exceptions apply. Players may hold more than one non-FIFA nationality.

| No. | Pos. | Nation | Player |

=== Ilūkste ===
In: Note: Flags indicate national team as defined under FIFA eligibility rules; some limited exceptions apply. Players may hold more than one non-FIFA nationality.

| No. | Pos. | Nation | Player |
|---|---|---|---|
| 1 | GK | (Latvia) LVA | Igors Serkovs (on loan from Daugava Daugavpils) |
| 3 | DF | (Latvia) LVA | Dmitrijs Plukaitis (from Spartaks) |
| 6 | DF | (Latvia) LVA | Jevgēņijs Adamjonoks (unattached) |
| 8 | MF | (Latvia) LVA | Andrejs Polovinkins (from Ventspils-2) |
| 44 | FW | (Latvia) LVA | Ričards Raščevskis (on loan from Daugava Daugavpils) |

Out: Note: Flags indicate national team as defined under FIFA eligibility rules; some limited exceptions apply. Players may hold more than one non-FIFA nationality.

| No. | Pos. | Nation | Player |
|---|---|---|---|
| 8 | MF | (Latvia) LVA | Jans Radevičs (loan return to Daugava Daugavpils) |
| 33 | GK | (Latvia) LVA | Jevgēņijs Ņerugals (loan return to Daugava Daugavpils) |

=== METTA-2/Salaspils ===
In: Note: Flags indicate national team as defined under FIFA eligibility rules; some limited exceptions apply. Players may hold more than one non-FIFA nationality.

| No. | Pos. | Nation | Player |
|---|---|---|---|
| — | GK | (Latvia) LVA | Dagnis Sausais (from Smiltene/BJSS) |
| — | DF | (Latvia) LVA | Dāvis Burmistris (from Alberts) |

Out: Note: Flags indicate national team as defined under FIFA eligibility rules; some limited exceptions apply. Players may hold more than one non-FIFA nationality.

| No. | Pos. | Nation | Player |

=== Spartaks-2 ===
In: Note: Flags indicate national team as defined under FIFA eligibility rules; some limited exceptions apply. Players may hold more than one non-FIFA nationality.

| No. | Pos. | Nation | Player |
|---|---|---|---|
| — | DF | (Latvia) LVA | Maksims Lukaševičs (from Spartaks) |
| — | DF | (Latvia) LVA | Edgars Pūliņš (from Spartaks) |
| — | FW | (Latvia) LVA | Aleksandrs Briļs (from Spartaks) |
| — | FW | (Latvia) LVA | Artūrs Krasnočubs (from Spartaks) |

Out: Note: Flags indicate national team as defined under FIFA eligibility rules; some limited exceptions apply. Players may hold more than one non-FIFA nationality.

| No. | Pos. | Nation | Player |
