= Tomislav Stipić =

Bosnian football manager (born 1979)

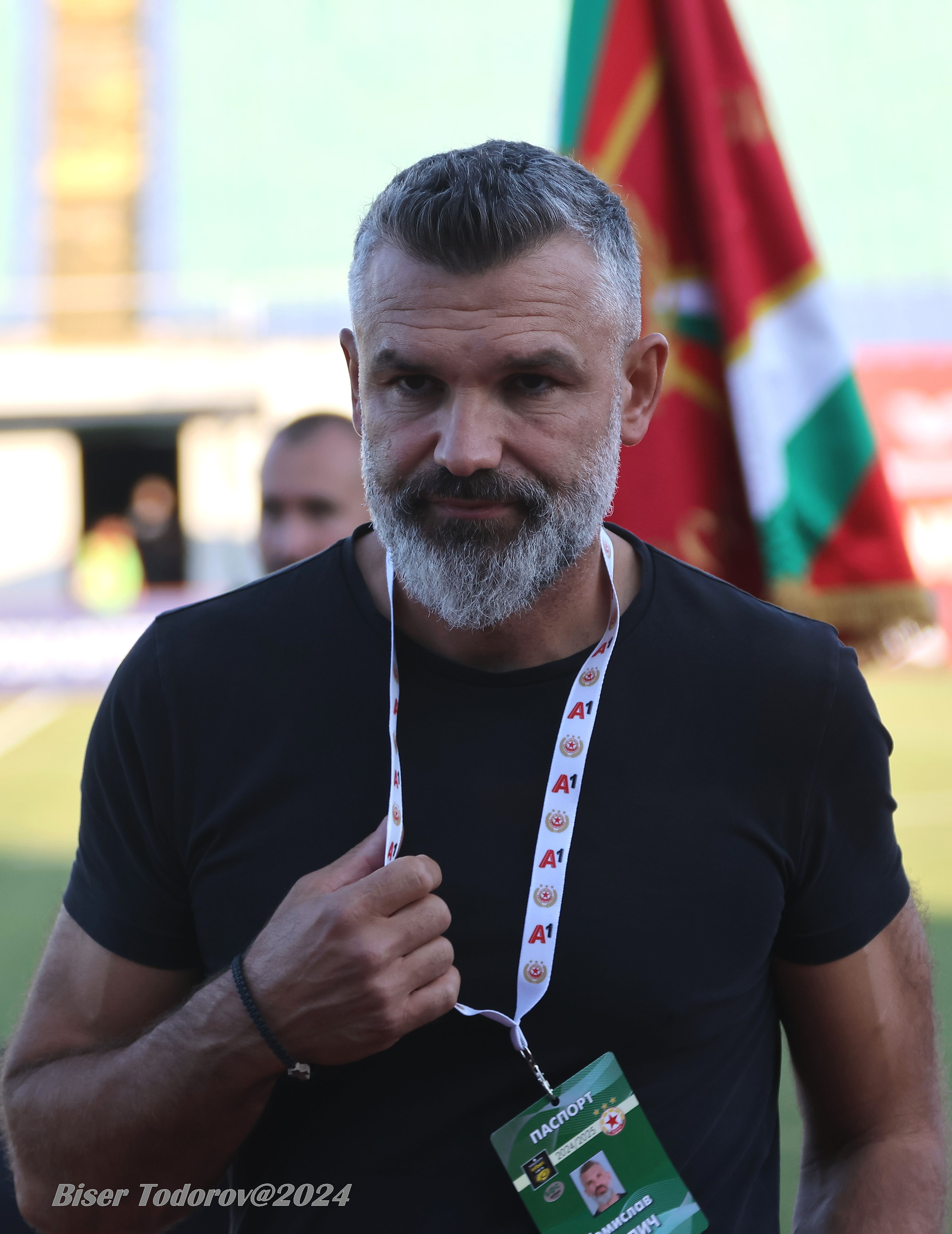

Personal information
- Date of birth: 1 August 1979 (age 47)
- Place of birth: Tomislavgrad, SR Bosnia and Herzegovina, Yugoslavia
- Height: 1.90 m (6 ft 3 in)
- Position: Midfielder

Managerial career
- Years: Team
- 2010–2013: Ingolstadt 04 (youth)
- 2013–2014: Ingolstadt 04 II
- 2014–2015: Erzgebirge Aue
- 2015–2016: Stuttgarter Kickers
- 2017: Nantong Zhiyun
- 2018–2019: Eintracht Frankfurt (youth)
- 2019: Grasshoppers
- 2019–2021: Slaven Belupo
- 2022: Auda
- 2023: Riga
- 2024: CSKA Sofia
- 2025: Fez
- 2026 –: Vukovar 1991

Tomislav Stipić (Croatian pronunciation: [tǒmislaʋ stǐːpitɕ]; born 1 August 1979) is a Bosnian professional football manager.

== Personal life ==
Stipić was born in Tomislavgrad, SR Bosnia and Herzegovina, back then part of SFR Yugoslavia. Aged ten, he moved with his mother and seven siblings as refugee to Germany. His father had already lived in Germany since 1968.

== Coaching career ==
He managed the youth team and the reserve team of Ingolstadt 04. On 9 September 2014, he signed a two-year contract to replace Falko Götz at Erzgebirge Aue. He was sacked on 27 May 2015.

He was appointed as head coach of the Stuttgarter Kickers on 4 November 2015.

On 9 April, Grasshoppers announced the release of Stipić after 34 days in charge.

On 8 October 2019, Stipić was appointed as head coach of the Croatian club Slaven Belupo. He left the club on 16 June 2021.

On 1 January 2022, Stipić joined the Latvian club FK Auda. On 19 october 2022, he led his club to win the 2022 Latvian Football Cup for the first time in history.

On 7 January 2023, Stipić was appointed manager of Riga. Stipić led Riga FC to win the 2023 Latvian Cup. After the season, Stipić was fired after losing the championship title with a one-point difference to RFS, after leading the table with three points with three rounds to go prior to the season's ending.

On 4 June 2024, Stipić was appointed as head coach of the Bulgarian club CSKA Sofia. After the away match with Arda Kardzhali, which resulted in a 2:1 loss, negotiations began with the club's management. He left the club on 25th August 2024, but also demanded that the management pay all of his salaries. He led the club for only five rounds, four of which were losses.

== Managerial statistics ==
As of match played 11 May 2025

Managerial record by team and tenure
Team	From	To	Record				
Team	From	To	G	W	D	L	Win %
Ingolstadt 04 II	July 2013	September 2014	46	21	13	12	45.65
Erzgebirge Aue	September 2014	May 2015	31	9	9	13	29.03
Stuttgarter Kickers	1 November 2015	4 July 2016	24	8	6	10	33.33
Nantong Zhiyun	2 November 2016	17 July 2017	2	1	0	1	50.00
Eintracht Frankfurt (youth)	29 July 2018	10 March 2019	19	5	5	9	26.32
Grasshoppers	21 March 2019	7 April 2019	5	0	3	2	0.00
Slaven Belupo	8 October 2019	10 June 2021	66	18	20	28	27.27
FK Auda	1 January 2022	31 December 2022	40	19	6	15	47.50
Riga FC	1 January 2023	15 November 2023	46	33	7	6	71.74
CSKA Sofia	4 June 2024	25 August 2024	5	1	0	4	20.00
Fez	5 March 2025	3 June 2025	9	2	4	3	22.22
Total			293	117	73	103	39.93

== Honours ==
=== Manager ===
FK Auda

- Latvian Cup : 2022

Riga FC

- Latvian Cup : 2023
