= 2023 Latvian Higher League =

Latvian Higher League
- Season: 2023
- Dates: 11 March – 11 November
- Champions: RFS
- Relegated: Super Nova
- Champions League: RFS
- Conference League: Auda; Liepāja; Riga
- Matches: 180
- Goals: 523 (2.91 per match)
- All statistics correct as of 7 January 2024.

The 2023 Latvian Higher League, known as the Optibet Virslīga for sponsorship reasons, was the 32nd season of top-tier football in Latvia. The season began on 11 March 2023 and ended on 11 November 2023.

The winners (RFS, their second title win) qualified for the 2024–25 Champions League first qualifying round. The second-placed team (Riga) qualified for the 2024–25 Conference League second qualifying round, with the third and fifth-placed teams (Auda and Liepāja) qualifying for the first qualifying round (fourth-placed Valmiera were refused a UEFA license). The ninth-placed team (Metta) qualified for the Latvian Higher League play-off, winning and retaining their place in the league. The bottom team (Super Nova) were relegated to the 2024 Latvian First League.

== Teams ==
Ten teams contested the league; the top nine clubs from the previous season, and one team promoted from 1. līga.

Promoted from 2022 Latvian First League	Relegated
Jelgava	Spartaks Jūrmala

FS Jelgava won promotion by winning the First League in 2022. After Spartaks Jūrmala withdrew their application for the necessary license for participation in the league, SK Super Nova (who had been relegated) were given the chance to return to the league. Ninth-placed Metta defeated Grobiņa from the Latvian First League to retain their status in the top-flight. Valmiera entered the season as defending champions.

2023 Virslīga competitors
Club	Seasons in Virsliga	2022 position	Stadium	Capacity
BFC Daugavpils	10	7th	Celtnieks Stadium	1,980
FK Auda	2	5th	Audas Stadions	520
FS Jelgava	1	1st in 1. līga	Zemgale Olympic Center	2,500
FK Liepāja	10	4th	Daugava Stadium (Liepāja)	4,022
Metta/LU	12	9th	Daugava Stadium (Riga)	10,461
RFS	8	3rd	LNK Sporta Parks	2,300
Riga FC	8	2nd	Skonto Stadium	8,087
SK Super Nova	2	10th	Sloka Stadium	2,500
FK Tukums 2000	2	6th	Tukuma Pilsētas Stadions	1,000
Valmiera FC	6	1st	Jāņa Daliņa Stadions	1,250

== League table ==
Pos	Team	Pld	W	D	L	GF	GA	GD	Pts	Qualification or relegation
1	RFS (C)	36	27	8	1	96	18	+78	89	Qualification for the Champions League first qualifying round
2	Riga	36	27	7	2	89	21	+68	88	Qualification for the Conference League second qualifying round (Note: The 2023 Latvian Football Cup winners qualified for the Conference League second qualifying round. Since the cup winners (Riga) qualified based on league position, the Conference League spot was passed to the second-placed team. After Valmiera were denied a UEFA license, the second Conference League first qualifying round spot was passed to the fifth-placed team.)
3	Auda	36	16	10	10	44	39	+5	58	Qualification for the Conference League first qualifying round
4	Valmiera	36	14	11	11	47	40	+7	53	
5	Liepāja	36	14	9	13	52	54	−2	51	Qualification for the Conference League first qualifying round
6	Jelgava	36	10	10	16	42	57	−15	40	
7	Daugavpils	36	9	9	18	40	52	−12	36	
8	Tukums 2000	36	9	8	19	47	83	−36	35	
9	Metta (O)	36	8	9	19	41	63	−22	33	Qualification for the Latvian Higher League play-off
10	Super Nova (R)	36	3	5	28	25	96	−71	14	Relegation to the Latvian First League

Source: Soccerway
Rules for classification: 1) Points; 2) Head-to-head points; 3) Head-to-head goal difference; 4) Goal difference; 5) Goals scored; 6) Fair-play ranking; 7) Play-off.
(C) Champions; (O) Play-off winners; (R) Relegated

== Results ==
Home \ Away	AUD	DAU	JEL	LIE	MLU	RFS	RIG	SUP	TUK	VAL	AUD	DAU	JEL	LIE	MLU	RFS	RIG	SUP	TUK	VAL
Auda		1–1	1–0	0–4	3–1	0–0	0–2	2–0	0–3	0–4		1–0	3–0	1–1	3–1	2–5	0–1	1–0	1–0	0–0
Daugavpils	0–2		5–2	1–2	1–1	0–5	1–1	3–0	3–3	1–1	0–2		1–1	2–1	4–2	0–1	0–2	2–0	3–1	0–0
Jelgava	0–0	2–1		2–1	2–1	0–2	1–3	2–0	2–2	2–0	0–2	0–0		3–2	2–3	0–1	1–3	2–2	2–0	0–1
Liepāja	1–1	1–0	3–2		1–1	0–3	0–3	2–1	0–1	1–2	1–1	2–1	1–1		3–2	1–1	0–4	2–0	1–0	1–4
Metta	0–2	3–2	0–1	1–1		0–0	0–2	4–1	3–2	0–1	0–1	0–0	0–1	1–1		0–6	1–3	0–1	1–1	4–1
RFS	2–0	3–1	4–0	2–0	5–0		0–0	2–1	1–0	2–1	3–0	3–1	1–0	3–1	1–0		0–0	5–0	7–0	3–0
Riga	2–0	1–0	2–1	3–1	4–0	1–1		5–1	5–1	3–0	1–0	3–0	3–5	3–1	1–0	2–2		1–1	4–0	3–0
Super Nova	0–2	0–4	2–2	2–6	0–3	1–6	0–4		2–0	1–0	0–5	0–1	1–1	0–2	1–3	0–4	1–5		2–5	0–2
Tukums 2000	2–2	1–0	2–0	0–3	1–2	1–7	0–2	3–2		0–0	2–2	3–0	0–0	1–2	1–1	4–5	0–6	1–0		3–2
Valmiera	1–1	1–0	2–0	0–1	1–1	0–0	1–0	3–1	4–3		1–2	0–1	2–2	1–1	2–1	1–0	1–1	1–1	6–0	

Source: Soccerway
Legend: Blue = home team win; Yellow = draw; Red = away team win.

== Latvian Higher League play-off ==
The ninth-placed club (Metta) faced the third-placed club from the 2023 Latvian First League (Skanste) for the final place in the following season's Latvian Higher League.

=== First leg ===
22 November 2023	Metta	6–1	Skanste	Riga
16:00 BST	Puzirevskis 12', 56'; Vapne 23' (pen.); Corréa 48'; Kamara 60'; Melnis 70'		Ivulans 24'	Stadium: Daugava Stadium

=== Second leg ===
25 November 2023	Skanste	1–2 (2–8 agg.)	Metta	Riga
11:00 BST				Stadium: Skanstes Stadium

== Season statistics ==
=== Top scorers ===
As of match played 11 November 2023

Rank	Player	Club	Goals
1	(Latvia) Marko Regža	Riga	19
2	(Latvia) Jānis Ikaunieks	RFS	15
3	(Serbia) Andrej Ilić	RFS	14
4	(Brazil) Dodô	Liepāja	13
5	(Brazil) Reginaldo Ramires	Auda	12
6	(Ivory Coast) Ismaël Diomandé	BFC Daugavpils/RFS	11
7	(Latvia) Jevgenijs Miņins	Super Nova	10
8	(Brazil) Emerson Deocleciano	RFS	9
8	(Latvia) Raivis Ķiršs	Tukums 2000	9
8	(Latvia) Valerijs Lizunovs	Daugavpils	9
8	(Nigeria) Victor Osuagwu	Jelgava	9

==== Hat-tricks ====
Player	For	Against	Result	Date	Ref.
(Brazil) Emerson Deocleciano	RFS	Tukums 2000	1–7 (A)	9 May 2023	
(Ivory Coast) Ismaël Diomandé^{4}	RFS	Auda	2–5 (A)	23 July 2023	
(Latvia) Jānis Ikaunieks	RFS	Tukums 2000	7–0 (H)	29 July 2023	
(Brazil) Léo Gaúcho	Valmiera	Liepāja	1–4 (A)	17 September 2023	

- ^{4} Player scored 4 goals

==== Own goals ====
- (Latvia) Oļģerds Raščevskis – Jelgava vs Super Nova 5 April 2023
- (Latvia) Kārlis Mikuļskis – Valmiera vs Tukums 2000 6 April 2023
- (Latvia) Atis Ozols – Valmiera vs Tukums 2000 6 April 2023
- (Ghana) Moses Salifu – Daugavpils vs Valmiera 11 April 2023
- (Latvia) Dāvis Cucurs – Daugavpils vs RFS 19 April 2023
- (Latvia) Kristers Čudars – Riga vs Valmiera 30 April 2023
- (Senegal) Pape Fall – RFS vs Valmiera 4 May 2023
- (Latvia) Marcis Peilans – Super Nova vs Jelgava 18 May 2023
- (Latvia) Ivans Patrikejevs – Super Nova vs RFS 4 June 2023
- (Latvia) Roberts Veips – Jelgava vs Valmiera 5 June 2023
- (Latvia) Ivo Minkevičs – Auda vs Liepāja 30 July 2023
- (Senegal) Bacary Sané – Liepāja vs Valmiera 17 September 2023
- (Latvia) Kārlis Vilnis – Daugavpils vs Metta 29 September 2023
- (Latvia) Artjoms Černovs – Liepāja vs Super Nova 11 November 2023

=== Clean sheets ===
As of matches played on 11 November 2023

Rank	Player	Club	Clean sheets
1	(Latvia) Jevgēņijs Ņerugals	RFS	19
2	(Latvia) Nils Puriņš	Riga	16
3	(Venezuela) Carlos Olses	Valmiera	10
4	(Latvia) Vladislavs Kurakins	Daugavpils	8
5	(Cameroon) Fabrice Ondoa	Auda	7
5	(Latvia) Raivo Sturins	Jelgava	7
7	(Latvia) Roberts Ozols	Auda	5
8	(Latvia) Sergejs Vilkovs	Tukums 2000	4
8	(Latvia) Rihards Matrevics	Riga	4
8	(Latvia) Pāvels Šteinbors	RFS	4
8	(Latvia) Niks Aleksandrovs	Auda	4

=== Discipline ===
==== Red cards ====
As of match played 11 November 2023

- (Senegal) Ousseynou Niang - Riga vs RFS (18 March 2023)
- (South Sudan) Manyumow Achol - Auda vs Valmiera (2 April 2023)
- (Latvia) Gļebs Kļuškins - RFS vs Liepāja (5 April 2023)
- (Latvia) Maksims Sidorovs - Valmiera vs Tukums 2000 (6 April 2023)
- (Brazil) Lucas Rangel - Tukums 2000 vs Riga (10 April 2023)
- (Latvia) Maksims Sidorovs - Tukums 2000 vs Liepāja (18 April 2023)
- (Sweden) Doug Bergqvist - Jelgava vs Auda (19 April 2023)
- (Croatia) Božo Mikulić - Jelgava vs Auda (19 April 2023)
- (Ivory Coast) Ismaël Diomandé - Liepāja vs Daugavpils (23 April 2023)
- (Latvia) Jevgēņijs Ņerugals - RFS vs Super Nova (24 April 2023)
- (Latvia) Daniils Ulimbaševs - Auda vs Liepāja (7 May 2023)
- (Latvia) Roberts Veips - Valmiera vs Super Nova (8 May 2023)
- (Latvia) Artūrs Ļotčikovs - Super Nova vs Daugavpils (14 May 2023)
- (Tunisia) Fraj Kayramani - Tukums 2000 vs Valmiera (17 May 2023)
- (Latvia) Janis Krautmanis - Liepāja vs Valmiera (27 May 2023)
- (Senegal) Alioune Ndoye - Jelgava vs Valmiera (5 June 2023)
- (Latvia) Aleksejs Grjaznovs - Valmiera vs Liepāja (29 June 2023)
- (Brazil) Reginaldo Ramires - Auda vs Valmiera (5 June 2023)
- (Tunisia) Maroine Mihoubi - Valmiera vs Tukums 2000 (7 July 2023)
- (Latvia) Jegors Novikovs - Auda vs Liepāja (30 July 2023)
- (Latvia) Daniils Ulimbaševs - Auda vs Liepāja (30 July 2023)
- (Latvia) Davis Valmiers - Metta vs Jelgava (31 July 2023)
- (Senegal) Mouhamed El Bachir Ngom - Riga vs Metta (13 August 2023)
- (Senegal) Alioune Ndoye - Riga vs Valmiera (26 August 2023)
- (Senegal) Mame Balla Tine - Metta vs Liepāja (2 September 2023)
- (Slovenia) Žiga Lipušček - RFS vs Riga (16 September 2023)
- (Senegal) Mouhamadou Diaw - Liepāja vs Valmiera (17 September 2023)
- (Latvia) Vladislavs Fjodorovs - Metta vs Tukums 2000 (23 September 2023)
- (Latvia) Rendijs Šibass - Metta vs Tukums 2000 (23 September 2023)
- (Uganda) Allan Enyou - Super Nova vs Daugavpils (23 September 2023)
- (Brazil) Reginaldo Ramires - Valmiera vs Auda (24 September 2023)
- (Brazil) Léo Gaúcho - Valmiera vs Auda (24 September 2023)
- (Senegal) Alioune Ndoye - Valmiera vs Super Nova (27 September 2023)
- (Latvia) Oskars Vientiess - Daugavpils vs Metta (29 September 2023)
- (Jamaica) Kenroy Campbell - Daugavpils vs Riga (21 October 2023)
- (Senegal) Bacary Sané - Liepāja vs Auda (21 October 2023)
- (Lithuania) Kristupas Keršys - Metta vs Jelgava (22 October 2023)
- (Japan) Ikuto Gomi - Jelgava vs Auda (28 October 2023)
- (Senegal) Djibril Guèye - Metta vs Valmiera (29 October 2023)
- (Latvia) Emīls Urbāns - RFS vs Daugavpils (29 October 2023)
- (Latvia) Kristers Čudars - Jelgava vs Valmiera (5 November 2023)
- (Latvia) Niks Sliede - Jelgava vs Valmiera (5 November 2023)
