= Deniss Meļņiks =

Latvian footballer (born 2002)

Personal information
- Date of birth: 7 September 2002 (age 24)
- Place of birth: Latvia
- Height: 1.90 m (6 ft 3 in)
- Positions: Defender; midfielder

Team information
- Current team: Falkirk
- Number: 21

Youth career
- –2019: Riga
- 2019–2020: Torino

Senior career*
Years	Team	Apps	(Gls)
2021–2022	Spartaks	38	(0)
2023–2026	Auda	74	(9)
2023	→ Riga (loan)	3	(0)
2026–	Falkirk	0	(0)

International career^{‡}
2018	Latvia U17	17	(3)
2019	Latvia U18	2	(1)
2019–2020	Latvia U19	9	(1)
2021–2024	Latvia U21	16	(0)
2024–	Latvia	18	(1)
- * Club domestic league appearances and goals as of 9 November 2025 ‡ National team caps and goals as of 12 November 2026

Deniss Meļņiks (born 7 September 2002) is a Latvian professional footballer who plays as a defender or midfielder for Scottish Premiership club Falkirk and the Latvia national team.

== Club career ==
As a youth player, Meļņiks joined the youth academy of Latvian side Riga. Following his stint there, he joined the youth academy of Italian Serie A side Torino in 2019.

Ahead of the 2021 season, he signed for Latvian side Spartaks, where he made thirty-eight league appearances and scored zero goals. Subsequently, he signed for Latvian side Auda in 2023, helping the club win the 2025 Latvian Football Cup.

== International career ==
Meļņiks is a Latvia international. During September and October 2023 and March 2024 he played for the Latvia national under-21 football team for 2025 UEFA European Under-21 Championship qualification.

=== International goals ===
As of match played 12 November 2026

Scores and results list Latvia's goal tally first, score column indicates score after each Meļņiks goal.

List of international goals scored by Deniss Meļņiks
No.	Date	Venue	Opponent	Score	Result	Competition
1	12 November 2026	Podgorica City Stadium, Podgorica, Montenegro	Montenegro	1–1	1–2	2026–27 UEFA Nations League C

== Style of play ==
Meļņiks plays as a defender or midfielder. Latvian news website Baltic Football News wrote in 2024 that he "has showcased his versatility and defensive prowess".
