= 2025 Latvian Football Cup =

Football competition held in Latvia

Tournament details
- Country: Latvia
- Teams: 49

Final positions
- Champions: Auda
- Runners-up: Riga

The 2025 Latvian Football Cup, known as the "11.lv Latvian Cup" for sponsorship reasons, was the 31st edition of Latvia's national football cup. The tournament was held in single elimination matches. The winners qualified for the 2026–27 Conference League second qualifying round. A total of 49 teams played in this year. RFS were the defending champions.

Auda won the cup (their second Latvian Football Cup win), defeating Riga 2–1 in the final and they qualified for the Conference League.

== Preliminary round ==
The draw was made on 17 April 2025 and the matches were scheduled on 2 and 5 May 2025.

Team 1	Score	Team 2
2 May 2025
Valmiera	8–0	Limbaži
5 May 2025
Talsi	1–5	Aliance

== First round ==
The draw was made on the same day as a preliminary round and the matches were scheduled from 14 to 18 May 2025.

Team 1	Score	Team 2
14 May 2025
Spēks	4–3 (a.e.t.)	JDFS Alberts
16 May 2025
Valmiera	6–0	Cēsis
17 May 2025
Valka	1–9	Aliance
Union/Daugava	5–0	Lielupe
Kuivižu Spartaks	0–5	Upesciema Warriors
Rīgas Futbola Skola	8–0	Bauskas BJSS/Mēmele
Dienvidkurzemes	3–0	DVSK Traktors
Līvāni	4–0	Viola
Pļaviņas DM	4–0	Namejs
18 May 2025
Kuldīgas/Goldingen United	2–3	Salaspils
Iecava	1–2	Ķekava-Auda
RSU	5–1	Parks
Riga United	6–0	Babīte

== Second round ==
The 14 first round winners and ten teams in Tier 2 entered a second round. The draw was made on 19 May 2025, and the matches were scheduled from 30 May to 1 June 2025.

Team 1	Score	Team 2
30 May 2025
Upesciema Warriors	0–3	Riga Mariners
31 May 2025
Valmiera	4–3	Ogre United
Ķekava-Auda	0–3	Mārupes
Aliance	0–6	JFK Ventspils
Pļaviņas DM	3–2	Rīgas Futbola Skola
Līvāni	0–5	Skanstes
AFA Olaine	3–1	Augšdaugavas
Dienvidkurzemes	1–2	Leevon PPK
1 June 2025
JDFS Alberts	5–3	Smiltene/BJSS
Spēks	0–3	Riga United
Union/Daugava	4–0	Rēzekne
RSU	0–6	Salaspils

== Play-off round ==
The twelve second round winners entered a play-off round. The draw was made on the 3 June 2025 and the matches were scheduled from 21 to 24 June 2025.

Team 1	Score	Team 2
20 June 2025
Skanstes	1–2 (a.e.t.)	JDFS Alberts
Union/Daugava	1–3	JFK Ventspils
21 June 2025
Pļaviņas DM	3–5	AFA Olaine
Riga United (Riga)	0–3	Mārupes
Salaspils	4–5	Leevon PPK
22 June 2025
Riga Mariners	4–3 (a.e.t.)	Valmiera

== Round of 16 ==
The six play-off round winners and ten teams in Tier 1 entered the Round of 16. The draw was made on the 26 June 2025. The matches were scheduled from 11 July to 6 August 2025.

Team 1	Score	Team 2
11 July 2025
Riga Mariners	6–1	AFA Olaine
12 July 2025
JDFS Alberts	1–3	Super Nova
Jelgava	0–1	RFS
Riga	4–0	Tukums 2000
JFK Ventspils	0–2	Liepāja
13 July 2025
Leevon PPK	2–4	Daugavpils
Mārupes	1–4	Metta
6 August 2025
Auda	1–0	Grobiņas

== Quarter-finals ==
The eight Round of 16 winners entered the quarter-finals. The draw was made on the 15 July 2025 The quarter-final matches were scheduled for mid-August 2025.

Team 1	Score	Team 2
16 August 2025
Daugavpils	1–2	Liepāja
17 August 2025
Riga	10–0	Riga Mariners
RFS	3–2	Metta
18 August 2025
Auda	3–1 (a.e.t.)	Super Nova

== Semi-finals ==
The four quarter-final winners entered the semi-finals.

Team 1	Score	Team 2
17 September 2025
RFS	0–2	Auda
18 September 2025
Liepāja	0–4	Riga

== Final ==
The final was held between the two semi-final winners.

29 October 2025
19:45

Riga	1–2	Auda
Regža 39'	Report	Jackson 22'; Dašķevičs 77'

Skonto Stadium, Riga
Attendance: 1,043
Referee: Kristaps Ratnieks

== See also ==
- 2025 Latvian Higher League
