= 2023 Latvian Football Cup =

Football competition held in Latvia

Tournament details
- Country: Latvia
- Teams: 54

Final positions
- Champions: Riga
- Runners-up: RFS

The 2023 Latvian Football Cup, known as the Responsible Gaming Latvian Cup for sponsorship reasons, was the 29th edition of Latvia's national football cup. The tournament was held in single elimination matches. The winners qualified for the 2024–25 Conference League second qualifying round.

Riga won the cup on 25 October 2023 with a 5–3 penalty shootout win over RFS after a 1–1 draw, their second Latvian Football Cup win. Since they qualified for the Conference League based on league position, the Conference League spot for winning the cup was passed to the second-placed team in the 2023 Latvian Higher League.

== Preliminary round ==
Team 1	Score	Team 2
12 May 2023
Kadaga/Osta	2–1	Namejs
13 May 2023
RTU	0–3	JFC Jelgava
Dobele Allegro	1–0	Ludza
Sigulda	2–3	Sports United/Cēsis
14 May 2023
Lielupe	w/o	Varakļāni

== First round ==
Team 1	Score	Team 2
26 May 2023
Iecava	0–2	Rīgas Futbola Skola
Ķekava-Auda	5–1	Alberts
DVSK Traktors	0–1	Upesciema Warriors
27 May 2023
Madona/BJSS	0–1	Lielupe
Pļaviņas DM	0–3	Limbaži
Augšdaugava	1–2	PPK/Betsafe
Ogre United	1–1 (a.e.t.) (4–1 p)	Academy/LSPA
JFC Jelgava	3–4	JFK Daugava
Sports United/Cēsis	4–1	Staiceles Bebri
Aliance	4–0	Kadaga/Osta
Salaspils	1–3	Jekabpils
28 May 2023
FK Union	4–1	Dobele Allegro
Valka	0–7	Marupe
29 May 2023
Riga United	3–2 (a.e.t.)	RSU

== Second round ==
Team 1	Score	Team 2
9 June 2023
Upesciema Warriors	0–2 (a.e.t.)	FK Smiltene
Sports United/Cēsis	0–7	Grobiņa
10 June 2023
FK Union	0–10	JDFS Alberts
Rēzekne	4–1	JFK Daugava
Aliance	0–2	Dinamo Riga
AFA Olaine	4–0	JFK Ventspils
Mārupe	2–0	Skanste
11 June 2023
Ogre United	4–0	Riga United
PPK/Betsafe	1–0	Leevon Saldus
Jēkabpils SC	w/o	Limbaži
Ķekava-Auda	2–4	Rīgas Futbola Skola
12 June 2023
Beitar	5–3	Lielupe

== Play-off round ==
The twelve second round winners entered a play-off round.

Team 1	Score	Team 2
21 June 2023
JDFS Alberts	8–0	Rēzekne
22 June 2023
Grobiņa	2–3	AFA Olaine
Rīgas Futbola Skola	1–2	PPK/Betsafe
Dinamo Riga	0–11	Marupe
FK Smiltene	1–3	Beitar
23 June 2023
Jēkabpils SC	3–1	Ogre United

== Round of 16 ==
The six play-off round winners and ten teams in Tier 1 entered the Round of 16.

Team 1	Score	Team 2
15 July 2023
Jēkabpils SC	0–6	JDFS Alberts
Marupe	0–1	Beitar
Valmiera	2–0	Super Nova
AFA Olaine	1–3	Tukums 2000
16 July 2023
PPK/Betsafe	0–5	Riga
Daugavpils	1–4 (a.e.t.)	Auda
Jelgava	0–3	RFS
Metta	2–2 (a.e.t.) (3–4 p)	Liepāja

== Quarter-finals ==
The eight Round of 16 winners entered the quarter-finals.

Team 1	Score	Team 2
20 August 2023
Liepāja	7–0	Beitar
RFS	4–1	JDFS Alberts
21 August 2023
Valmiera	0–1	Tukums 2000
Auda	0–4	Riga

== Semi-finals ==
The four quarter-final winners entered the semi-finals.

Team 1	Score	Team 2
20 September 2023
Tukums 2000	1–3	RFS
Riga	2–1	Liepāja

== Final ==
25 October 2023
17:00

Riga	1–1 (a.e.t.)	RFS
Aurélio 43'		Ikaunieks 90+4' (pen.)
Penalties
Ngom (penalty scored); Muzinga (penalty scored); Dašķevičs (penalty scored); Bosančić (penalty scored); Contreras (penalty scored)	5–3	Ikaunieks (penalty scored); Zjuzins (penalty scored); Mareš (penalty missed); Lemajić (penalty scored)

Skonto Stadium, Riga
Attendance: 6,747
Referee: Vitālijs Spasjoņņikovs

== See also ==
- 2023 Latvian Higher League
