= Jayen Gerold =

Surinamese footballer (born 2004)

Jayne Gerold
Personal information
- Date of birth: 30 June 2004 (age 22)
- Place of birth: Amsterdam, The Netherlands
- Height: 1.67 m (5 ft 5 1/2 in)
- Position: Winger

Team information
- Current team: Auda
- Number: 46

Youth career
- –2015: Zeeburgia
- 2015–2023: AZ

Senior career*
Years	Team	Apps	(Gls)
2023–2025	Jong AZ	39	(3)
2025–	Auda	37	(3)

International career
2022	Suriname U20	3	(0)
- * Club domestic league appearances and goals as of 12 November 2026

Jayen Gerold (born 30 June 2004) is a professional footballer who plays as an attacker in the Latvian Higher League for Auda. Born in the Netherlands, he represents Suriname internationally.

== Club career ==
He played at AVV Zeeburgia until 2015 when he joined up with AZ Alkmaar at under-12 level. He was part of the AZ U18 side which won the U18 KNVB Cup. He made his professional debut for Jong AZ in the Eerste Divisie against Willem II in March 2023, providing an assist for Jayden Addai to score a late equaliser in a 2–2 draw.

In April 2023, he was a member of the AZ Alkmaar U19 side which became the first Dutch club to win the UEFA Youth League, and featured in the final in Geneva as they defeated Croatian club Hajduk Split U19 5–0. In September 2023, he signed a new two-year professional contract with the club.

He scored his first league goals on 18 October 2024 in a 3–2 defeat against Helmond Sport.

== International career ==
In June 2022, he was called up for three qualifying matches for Suriname national under-20 football team for the U-20 CONCACAF Gold Cup and was granted a starting spot in all three games.
