= Jevgēņijs Kosmačovs =

Latvian footballer (born 1988)

Personal information
- Full name: Jevgēņijs Kosmačovs
- Date of birth: 18 February 1988 (age 38)
- Place of birth: Tukums, Latvian SSR, USSR (now Republic of Latvia)
- Height: 1.77 m (5 ft 10 in)
- Position: Midfielder

Youth career
- –2005: Tukums 2000

Senior career*
Years	Team	Apps	(Gls)
2006–2012	Ventspils	104	(5)
2012	→ Sevastopol (loan)	10	(1)
2012	Shakhtyor Soligorsk	5	(0)
2013	Spartaks Jūrmala	5	(0)
2013	Tukums 2000	15	(14)
2014	Daugava Daugavpils	31	(12)
2016	Tukums 2000	14	(7)
2016–2017	Olimpia Kowary		
2018–2020	SV Victoria Seelow	52	(4)

International career
2007–2010	Latvia U21	11	(3)
2007–2010	Latvia	3	(0)
- * Club domestic league appearances and goals

Jevgēņijs Kosmačovs (born 18 February 1988) is a Latvian former professional footballer who played as a midfielder.

== Club career ==
Born in Tukums, Western Latvia, Kosmačovs began his career with hometown side FK Tukums 2000 in their youth team. In 2005, he made his debut for them playing in the Latvian First League. In 2006 Kosmačovs joined Latvian Higher League side FK Ventspils, making four appearances in the 2006 season, as they were crowned the champions. He made 14 appearances in 2007, scoring one goal as Ventspils were again the champions of Latvia. That year Kosmačovs also managed to win the Latvian Cup with the team. The 2008 season saw him make 16 appearances, scoring one goal, helping his team become the champions for 3 consecutive seasons. In the following season he already played 24 times, scoring one goal, as Ventspils finished as the runners-up to Liepājas Metalurgs. In 2009 Kosmačovs was named the best young (U-21) player in Latvia. In the 2009–2010 season Jevgēņijs also participated in the UEFA Europa League group stages.

In January 2010 it was reported that Kosmačovs, along with fellow Ventspils teammate, Aleksandrs Solovjovs was on trial at English Championship side, Blackpool. On 28 January it was claimed that Blackpool had made an offer to sign Kosmačovs. It was later reported that, despite the offer made by Blackpool for Kosmačovs, they could not agree a deal with Ventspils. Later he was also taken on trial to the Ukrainian Premier League club Metalurh Zaporizhya by the former Ventspils coach Roman Hryhorchuk.

In the 2010 season Kosmačovs played 18 matches, without scoring goals, and managed to become the Baltic League champion, as Ventspils beat the Lithuanian club Sūduva Marijampolė in the final. In 2011 Kosmačovs appeared in 28 league matches and scored 2 goals, becoming the champion of Latvia for the 4th time in his career.

On 2 February 2012 Kosmačovs was loaned out to the Ukrainian First League club PFC Sevastopol until the summer of 2012. He scored 1 goal in 10 league matches for the club. After returning from loan, Kosmačovs was sold to the Belarusian Premier League club Shakhtyor Soligorsk. He helped the team finish as the runners-up of the 2012 season. In February 2013 Kosmačovs returned to the Latvian Higher League, signing a contract with Spartaks Jūrmala. Having played 5 matches, he was released in May 2013. In July 2013 Kosmačovs joined his previous club Tukums 2000, playing in the Latvian First League. Before the start of the 2014 season Kosmačovs returned to the Latvian Higher League, joining Daugava Daugavpils. He became the club's top scorer of the season with 12 goals in 31 matches. Since then Kosmačovs has played for clubs in Poland and Germany.

== International career ==
Kosmačovs was a member of Latvia U21 from 2007 to 2010. In this period of time, he participated in 11 matches, scoring 3 goals. Jevgēņijs made his debut for Latvia on 6 February 2007 in a friendly match against Bulgaria, coming on as a substitute in the 87th minute. The game took place in Limassol, Cyprus. He was yet again called up in 2010.

== Honours ==
Ventspils

- Latvian Higher League: 2006, 2007, 2008, 2011
- Latvian Cup: 2007, 2010–11
- Baltic League: 2009–10

Individual

- Latvian Higher League Best Under-21 Player: 2009
