= Reginaldo Ramires =

Brazilian footballer (born 2001)

Personal information
- Full name: Reginaldo Ramires de Oliveira Albertino
- Date of birth: 25 April 2001 (age 25)
- Place of birth: Olímpia, Brazil
- Height: 1.78 m (5 ft 10 in)
- Position: Forward

Team information
- Current team: Riga FC
- Number: 10

Youth career
- 2016–2017: América-SP
- 2017–2018: Rio Preto
- 2018–2019: América-SP
- 2019–2020: Audax
- 2019: → Fluminense (loan)

Senior career*
Years	Team	Apps	(Gls)
2020–2023	Audax	3	(0)
2021	→ Red Bull Brasil (loan)	16	(5)
2022	→ Ponte Preta (loan)	5	(0)
2022–2023	→ Akritas Chlorakas (loan)	15	(3)
2023–	Riga FC	85	(37)
2023–2024	→ Riga-2 (loan)	3	(0)
2023–2024	→ FK Auda (loan)	32	(23)
- * Club domestic league appearances and goals as of 12 November 2026

Reginaldo Ramires de Oliveira Albertino (born 25 April 2001) is a Brazilian professional footballer who plays as a forward for the Latvian Higher League club Riga FC.

== Club career ==
Ramires is a youth product of the Brazilian clubs América-SP, Rio Preto, and Audax, with a brief loan with the youth side of Fluminense in 2019. In 2020, he began his senior career with Audax, and in 2021, he went on loan with Red Bull Brasil. In January 2022, he was loan out to Ponte Preta where he debuted in the Campeonato Brasileiro Série B.

On 12 August 2022, he moved to Cyprus with Akritas Chlorakas on another season-long loan. On 28 February 2023, he moved to the Latvian club Riga FC. After 2 goals in 12 games with Riga, he joined FK Auda on loaned from 2022 until 2023 scoring 25 goals and 4 assists in 35 games. On 30 June 2024, he returned to Riga FC. He was he top scorer of the 2024 Latvian Higher League, and one of the most prolific scorers in Europe in 2024 with 25 goals.

== Honours ==
Individual

- Latvian Higher League top scorer: 2024
