= 2022 Latvian Football Cup =

Football competition held in Latvia

Tournament details
- Country: Latvia
- Teams: 54

Final positions
- Champions: Auda
- Runners-up: RFS

Tournament statistics
- Matches played: 46
- Goals scored: 217 (4.72 per match)

The 2022 Latvian Football Cup, known as the ‘’’Responsible Gaming Latvian Cup’’’ for sponsorship reasons, was a single elimination association football tournament which began on 6 May 2022.

== Preliminary round ==
Six preliminary round matches were played between 6 May and 8 May 2022.

Team 1	Score	Team 2
DSVK Traktors	4–3	Kadaga
JFC Jelgava	2–0	Cēsis
Sigulda	2–2 (5–4 p)	FK Olaine/FK Union
Augšdaugava	2–1	Ogre United
Dobele Allegro	3–0	Bauskas BJSS/Mēmele
Kengaroos	4–2	Varakļāni

== First round ==
Fourteen first round matches were played on 21-22 May 2022.

Team 1	Score	Team 2
Valka	0–2	Gulbenes BJSS
JFC Jelgava	4–3	Babites SK
Augšdaugava	3–2	FK Jūrnieks
Jēkabpils	4–2	Kekava/Auda
Aliance	1–4	Limbaži
Silguda	0–5	Mārupe
Kengaroos	2–1	Gauja
DVSK Traktors	2–12	LBF FK Daugava
Priekuļi	4–1	Riga United
FK Pļaviņas DM	0–1	PPK
Lielupe	2–2 (7–8 p)	Madona Kvarcs
Beitar	4–1	Staiceles Bebri
Alberta	1–4	Parks
Upesciems	0–3	Dobele Allegro

== Second round ==
Twelve second round matches were played on 11–12 June 2022.

Team 1	Score	Team 2
Mārupe	3–3 (4–5 p)	Smiltene
Jēkabpils	1–1 (4–3 p)	Dinamo Riga
Gulbenes BJSS	0–9	Salaspils FC
Leevon Saldus	3–0	JFC Jelgava
Priekuļi	1–4	Limbaži
Skanste	1–0	PPK
Beitar	1–8	FS Jelgava
Dobele Allegro	0–1	Augšdaugava
Madona Kvarcs	0–5	Rēzekne FA
AFA Olaine	2–8	Grobiņa
LBF FK Daugava	2–5	JDFS Alberts
Kengaroos	0–1	Parks

== Play-off round ==
Six Play-off Round matches were played on 22-26 June 2022.

Team 1	Score	Team 2
Grobiņa	2–0	Smiltene
JDFS Alberts	4–2	Leevon Saldus
Rēzekne FA	1–2	Skanste
Salaspils	2–0	Augšdaugava
Parks	0–11	FS Jelgava
Limbaži	0–2	Jēkabpils

== Round of 16 ==
Eight Round of 16 matches were played on 9–11 July 2022.

Team 1	Score	Team 2
Super Nova	0–2	Tukums
RFS	4–0	Spartaks Jūrmala
Skanste	6–1	Jēkabpils
Salaspils FC	0–13	Metta
Grobiņa	2–1	Liepāja
FS Jelgava	2–1	JDFS Alberts
Riga	0–2	Valmiera FC
Auda	2–1	Daugavpils

== Quarter–finals ==
The quarter–finals were played on 13–14 August 2022.

Team 1	Score	Team 2
Grobiņa	2-0	Skanste
Valmiera	0–0 (5–6 p)	Auda
FS Jelgava	2-1	Metta
Tukums	1-4	RFS

== Semi–finals ==
The semi–finals were played on 19 September 2022.

Team 1	Score	Team 2
RFS	5–0	Grobiņa
Auda	6–1	FS Jelgava

== Final ==
The final was played on 19 October 2022.

19 October 2022
20:00

Auda	1:0	RFS
Daniils Ulimbaševs	Report

Skonto Stadium
Attendance: 2539
Referee: Edgars Maļcevs

== See also ==
- 2022 Latvian Higher League
