= Jairo Mosquera =

Colombian footballer (born 1986)

Personal information
- Full name: Jairo Andrés Mosquera Mendoza
- Date of birth: 2 May 1986 (age 40)
- Height: 1.74 m (5 ft 9 in)
- Position: Striker

Team information
- Current team: Unión Magdalena

Senior career*
Years	Team	Apps	(Gls)
2010	Guaraní	1	(0)
2011–2013	Spartaks Jūrmala	14	(6)
2012–2013	→ Salyut Belgorod (loan)	29	(3)
2013	Real Cartagena	15	(2)
2014–	Unión Magdalena	7	(0)
- * Club domestic league appearances and goals as of 1 September 2013 (UTC)

Jairo Andrés Mosquera Mendoza (born May 2, 1986) is a Colombian footballer, who currently plays for Unión Magdalena in the Categoría Primera B.

== Teams ==
- Deportivo Pereira 2008
- Guaraní 2009–2011
- Spartaks Jūrmala 2011–2013
- → Salyut Belgorod 2012-2013 (loan)
- Real Cartagena 2013-present

== Titles ==
- Guaraní 2010 (Torneo Apertura)
