= Emīls Birka =

Latvian footballer (born 2000)

Personal information
- Date of birth: 25 April 2000 (age 26)
- Place of birth: Limbaži, Latvia
- Height: 1.80 m (5 ft 11 in)
- Position: Left-back

Team information
- Current team: Riga FC
- Number: 27

Youth career
- Metta

Senior career*
Years	Team	Apps	(Gls)
2017–2022	Metta	93	(5)
2022–2024	Valmiera	95	(4)
2025	Auda	19	(0)
2025–	Riga FC	15	(1)

International career^{‡}
2016	Latvia U17	9	(0)
2018	Latvia U19	11	(0)
2019–2021	Latvia U21	16	(0)
2024–	Latvia	1	(0)
- * Club domestic league appearances and goals as of 14 June 2026 ‡ National team caps and goals as of 8 June 2024

Emīls Birka (born 25 April 2000) is a Latvian football player who plays as a left-back for Riga FC and the Latvia national team.

== International career ==
Birka made his debut for the Latvia national team on 8 June 2024 in a 0–2 Baltic Cup loss against Lithuania at the Daugava Stadium. He substituted Andrejs Cigaņiks in the 62nd minute.
