= Ingars Stuglis =

Latvian footballer

Personal information
- Full name: Ingars Sarmis Stuglis
- Date of birth: 12 February 1996 (age 30)
- Place of birth: Aizkraukle, Latvia
- Height: 1.82 m (6 ft 0 in)
- Position: Midfielder

Senior career*
Years	Team	Apps	(Gls)
2012–2013	Skonto	3	(0)
2013	Skonto-2	17	(3)
2014–2017	Metta / LU	73	(6)
2017–2018	Spartaks Jūrmala	28	(1)
2019–2020	Ventspils	36	(2)
2020–2021	Liepāja	20	(0)
2022–2023	Tukums 2000	51	(3)
2023	HIF/Stein	6	(0)
2024	Grobiņas SC	10	(0)

International career^{‡}
2018	Latvia	1	(0)
- * Club domestic league appearances and goals as of 22 June 2026 ‡ National team caps and goals as of 22 June 2026

Ingars Sarmis Stuglis (born 12 February 1996) is a Latvian international footballer who played as a midfielder.

== Career ==
Born in Aizkraukle, he has played club football for Skonto FC, FS METTA/Latvijas Universitāte and FK Spartaks Jūrmala.

He won the 2017 Virsliga with Spartaks Jūrmala andth 2020 Latvian Cup with Liepāja.

He made his international debut for Latvia in 2018, coming on as a substitute against South Korea. He was also called up for a match cycle in November 2020, consisting of a friendly match and two Nations League fixtures.

== Personal life ==
He is a brother of Elvis Stuglis.
