= Iļja Korotkovs =

Latvian footballer (born 2000)

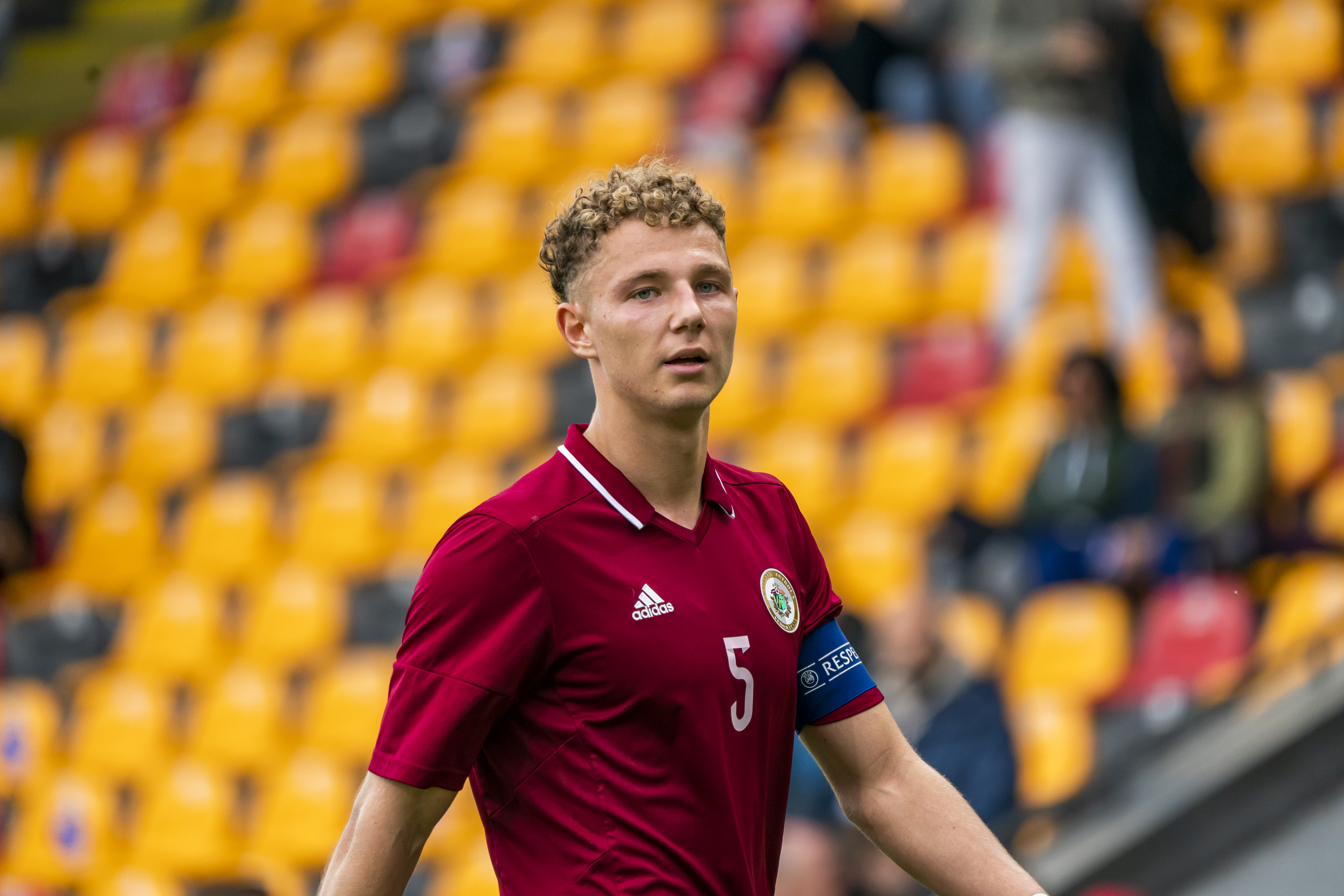

Personal information
- Date of birth: 24 May 2000 (age 26)
- Position: Defender

Team information
- Current team: FK Liepāja
- Number: 33

Youth career
- 2010–2013: Rīgas Futbola skola
- 2013-2016: FS Metta

Senior career*
| Years | Team | Apps | (Gls) |
| 2016-2018 | FK Metta-2 | | |
| 2019-2021 | FK Metta | 39 | (4) |
| 2022 | Riga FC | 7 | (0) |
| 2022 | → FK Auda (on loan) | 14 | (0) |
| 2023-2025 | FK Auda | 26 | (0) |
| 2025- | FK Liepāja | 21 | (0) |

International career^{‡}
| 2016-2017 | Latvia U17 | 2 | (0) |
| 2018-2019 | Latvia U19 | 3 | (0) |
| 2021-2022 | Latvia U21 | 8 | (1) |
| 2023 | Latvia | 0 | (0) |
- * Club domestic league appearances and goals as of 12 November 2026 ‡ National team caps and goals as of 25 July 2023

Iļja Korotkovs (born 24 May 2000) is a Latvian professional footballer who plays as a centre-back for FK Liepāja in the Latvian Higher League (Virslīga). Standing at 1.94 metres, Korotkovs is primarily a right-footed central defender. He has also represented Latvia at youth international level and has been called up to the senior national team.

Korotkovs is noted for his physical presence and pace for a central defender, with a recorded maximum sprint speed of approximately 34 km/h. His speed is particularly useful in defensive recovery situations and when defending against counter-attacks.

== Club career ==
=== Early career ===
Korotkovs began his football development in the Rīgas Futbola skola system before joining FS Metta in 2013. He progressed through the club’s youth structure and made his senior debut for FK Metta-2 in 2016.

In December 2018, Korotkovs signed his first professional contract with FK Metta. During his time at the club, he became an important member of the first team and established himself in Latvian top-flight football. In the 2021 season, he scored four goals in the Virslīga and served as captain of FK Metta. He was also nominated for the Latvian Football Federation’s awards, including the Latvian Footballer of the Year and Best Young Player categories.

=== Riga FC and Auda ===
In February 2022, Korotkovs joined Riga FC. He subsequently spent part of the 2022 season on loan at FK Auda, where he continued his development as a central defender. He later returned to Riga FC before moving permanently to Auda.

Korotkovs became an established player at Auda and gained experience in UEFA Europa Conference League qualifying matches.

=== FK Liepāja ===
In 2025, Korotkovs joined FK Liepāja. His return to competitive football followed a lengthy rehabilitation period after injury. In October 2025, he made his return to the pitch against Riga FC after approximately 13 months away from competitive football.

During the 2026 season, Korotkovs became a regular member of Liepāja’s defensive line, making appearances in both the Latvian Virslīga and UEFA Europa Conference League qualifying competition.

== International career ==
Korotkovs represented Latvia at under-17, under-19 and under-21 levels.

He made his Latvia U21 debut in 2021 and went on to make eight appearances in UEFA European Under-21 Championship qualifying matches, scoring once.

Korotkovs was subsequently called up to the Latvia senior national team. He was included in Latvia’s squads for international fixtures and was also listed in Latvia’s squad for the 2024 Baltic Cup. However, as of October 2026, he has not yet made his senior international debut.

== Style of play ==
Korotkovs primarily plays as a central defender. At 1.94 metres, he combines height and physical strength with notable pace for his position. His recorded maximum sprint speed of approximately ‘’‘34 km/h’’’ is one of his notable athletic attributes.

His playing style is characterised by physical strength, defensive positioning, aerial ability and the ability to cover significant distances at high speed. His pace allows him to recover quickly when defending against through balls and counter-attacks, while his physical profile makes him suited to duels against opposing forwards.

He is primarily right-footed and has experience playing in both central defence and deeper defensive positions.

== Personal information ==
Korotkovs was born in Riga, Latvia, on 24 May 2000. He wears number 33 for FK Liepāja.

== Career statistics ==
‘‘Club statistics are current as of the 2026 season.’’

- ‘’‘FK Metta-2’’’: 2016–2018
- ‘’‘FK Metta’’’: 2019–2022
- ‘’‘Riga FC’’’: 2022
- ‘’‘FK Auda’’’ (loan): 2022
- ‘’‘FK Auda’’’: 2023–2025
- ‘’‘FK Liepāja’’’: 2025–present

‘’‘International:’’’

- Latvia U17: 2 appearances
- Latvia U19: 3 appearances
- Latvia U21: 8 appearances, 1 goal
- Latvia senior team: 0 caps

== Career ==
Korotkovs has been called up for the 2023 Latvia matches against Turkey and Armenia.
