= Cristian Dros =

Moldovan footballer

Personal information
- Date of birth: 15 April 1998 (age 28)
- Place of birth: Bălți, Moldova
- Height: 1.84 m (6 ft 0 in)
- Position: Midfielder

Team information
- Current team: Vllaznia Shkodër
- Number: 98

Senior career*
Years	Team	Apps	(Gls)
2014–2018	Zaria Bălți	40	(1)
2019–2020	ASU Politehnica	31	(0)
2020–2021	Spartaks Jūrmala	30	(0)
2021	→ Slavia Mozyr (loan)	15	(0)
2022–2024	Slavia Mozyr	64	(4)
2024–2025	Elbasani	33	(1)
2025–	Vllaznia Shkodër	16	(0)

International career^{‡}
2014–2017	Moldova U17	3	(0)
2016–2017	Moldova U19	3	(0)
2019–2020	Moldova U21	6	(0)
2020–	Moldova	20	(0)
- * Club domestic league appearances and goals as of 24 June 2026 ‡ National team caps and goals as of 8 October 2026

Cristian Dros (born 15 April 1998) is a Moldovan footballer who plays as a midfielder for Kategoria Superiore club Vllaznia Shkodër and the Moldova national team.

In his career Dros also played for Zaria Bălți and ASU Politehnica Timișoara.
