= Daniils Ulimbaševs =

Latvian footballer

Personal information
- Date of birth: 12 March 1992 (age 34)
- Height: 1.80 m (5 ft 11 in)
- Position: Midfielder

Team information
- Current team: Metta
- Number: 28

Senior career*
Years	Team	Apps	(Gls)
2010–2011	Pomezia Calcio	1	(1)
2012	AFC United	2	(0)
2012	Spartaks Jūrmala	13	(2)
2013	Ilūkstes	11	(0)
2013–2014	Jūrmala	27	(1)
2014–2015	Ventspils	11	(0)
2015–2016	Spartaks Jūrmala	44	(3)
2017–2018	RFS	23	(7)
2018	→ Jelgava (loan)	12	(1)
2019	Liepāja	1	(0)
2019–2020	Ventspils	30	(6)
2021–2023	Auda	71	(10)
2024–	Metta	30	(1)

International career^{‡}
2013–2014	Latvia U21	7	(0)
2017–	Latvia	3	(0)
- * Club domestic league appearances and goals as of 12 November 2024 ‡ National team caps and goals as of 24 March 2019

Daniils Ulimbaševs (born 12 March 1992) is a Latvian footballer who plays as a midfielder for Latvian Higher League club Metta.

== Career ==
In 2021, Ulimbaševs joined Latvian Higher League club FK Auda.

== International ==
He made his debut for the Latvia national football team on 10 October 2017 in a World Cup qualifier group game against Andorra.

== Honours ==
FK Auda

- Latvian Cup : 2022
