= Eduards Dašķevičs =

Latvian footballer (born 2002)

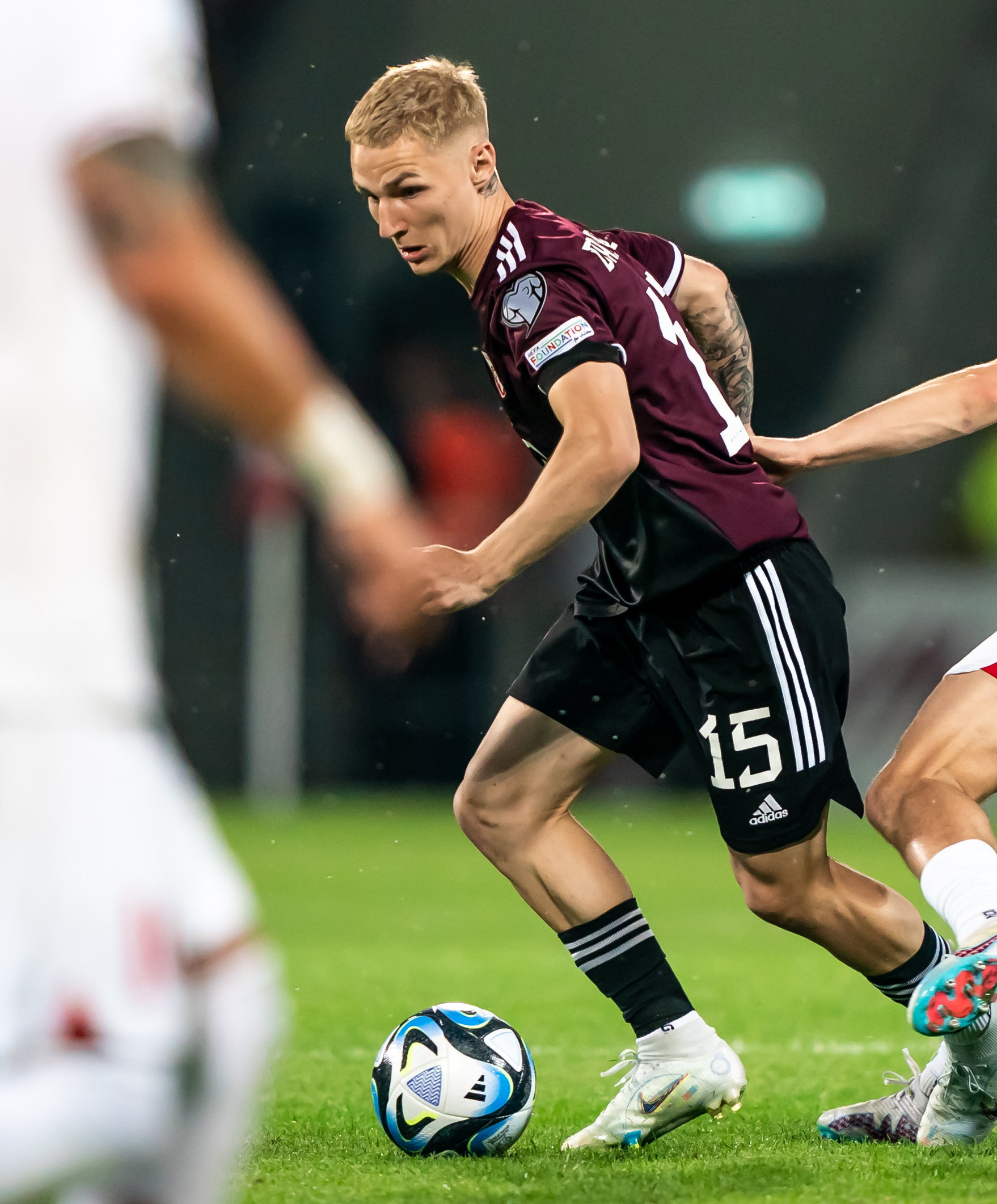
- On his debut against Turkey

Personal information
- Date of birth: 12 July 2002 (age 24)
- Position: Midfielder

Team information
- Current team: FK Auda
- Number: 17

Youth career
- –2018: Daugavpils Futbola skola
- 2018–2021: Anderlecht

Senior career*
Years	Team	Apps	(Gls)
2021–2022	Hamkam	10	(0)
2023–2025	Riga FC	80	(9)
2025–	FK Auda	39	(11)

International career^{‡}
2018	Latvia U17	3	(0)
2019	Latvia U19	3	(2)
2020–2022	Latvia U21	10	(0)
2023–	Latvia	30	(1)
- * Club domestic league appearances and goals as of 12 November 2026 ‡ National team caps and goals as of 18 November 2026

Eduards Dašķevičs (born 12 July 2002) is a Latvian footballer who plays as a midfielder or wing back for FK Auda.

== Career ==
He hails from Daugavpils. On 1 July 2018 he joined the youth system of Anderlecht. He also made his first-team debut in the summer of 2019, first in a friendly match against RWDM and then another friendly against Benfica. Internationally, he played 3 matches each for Latvia U17 and Latvia U19 before joining Latvia U21 in 2020, at the age of 18.

Dašķevičs made his debut for the Latvia on 16 June 2023, coming on as a substitute in 76 minute for Andrejs Cigaņiks against Turkey.

In 2021 he was signed by his first senior team, Norwegian club Hamarkameratene. He made his debut in the 2021 1. divisjon against Åsane, and made his Eliteserien debut in 2022 against Viking.

On 5 January 2023, Dašķevičs signed for Latvian Higher League side Riga FC.

== Career statistics ==
=== Club ===
As of match played 19 April 2025

Appearances and goals by club, season and competition
Club	Season	League			National cup (Note: Includes Norwegian Cup, Latvian Cup)		Continental		Other		Total	
Club	Season	Division	Apps	Goals	Apps	Goals	Apps	Goals	Apps	Goals	Apps	Goals
Hamkam	2021	1. divisjon	2	0	1	0	—		—		3	0
Hamkam	2022	Eliteserien	8	0	0	0	—		—		8	0
Hamkam	Total		10	0	1	0	—		—		11	0
Riga FC	2023	Virslīga	29	3	4	0	4 (Note: Appearance(s) in UEFA Europa Conference League)	0	—		37	3
Riga FC	2024	Virslīga	34	4	2	1	2	0	1 (Note: Appearance(s) in Latvian Supercup)	0	39	5
Riga FC	2025	Virslīga	6	2	0	0	0	0	1	0	7	2
Riga FC	Total		69	9	6	1	6	0	2	0	83	10
Career total			79	9	7	1	6	0	2	0	94	10

=== International ===
As of match played 15 November 2026

Appearances and goals by national team and year
National team	Year	Apps	Goals
Latvia	2023	8	0
Latvia	2024	8	0
Latvia	2025	8	0
Latvia	2025	4	1
2026	2	0	
Total		30	1

Scores and results list Cyprus' goal tally first; the score column indicates the score after each Dašķevičs goal.

List of international goals scored by Eduards Dašķevičs
No.	Date	Venue	Opponent	Score	Result	Competition
1	5 October 2026	GSP Stadium, Nicosia, Cyprus	Cyprus	1–0	1–2	2026–27 UEFA Nations League C
