= Jevgēņijs Ņerugals =

Latvian footballer (born 1989)

Personal information
- Date of birth: 26 February 1989 (age 37)
- Place of birth: Daugavpils, Latvian SSR
- Height: 1.96 m (6 ft 5 in)
- Position: Goalkeeper

Team information
- Current team: RFS
- Number: 13

Senior career*
Years	Team	Apps	(Gls)
2009	Dinaburg FC		
2010	BFC Daugavpils		
2011	FC Daugava	13	(0)
2012	Ilūkstes NSS		
2012–2013	FC Daugava	32	(0)
2014–2016	BFC Daugavpils	49	(0)
2017–2022	Spartaks Jūrmala	72	(0)
2021	→ RFS (loan)	1	(0)
2022–	RFS	71	(0)

International career
2018	Latvia	1	(0)
- * Club domestic league appearances and goals as of 12 November 2026

Jevgēņijs Ņerugals (born 26 February 1989) is a Latvian professional footballer who plays as a goalkeeper for Latvian Higher League club RFS.

== Career ==
Born in Daugavpils, Ņerugals has played for Dinaburg FC, BFC Daugavpils, FC Daugava, Ilūkstes NSS and Spartaks Jūrmala.

He made his international debut for Latvia in 2018.

== Career statistics ==
=== International ===
Appearances and goals by national team and year
National team	Year	Apps	Goals
Latvia
Latvia	2018	1	0
Total		1	0

== Honours ==
RFS

- Latvian Higher League: 2026
