= Vladislavs Fjodorovs =

Latvian footballer

Personal information
- Date of birth: 27 September 1996 (age 30)
- Place of birth: Daugavpils, Latvia
- Height: 1.87 m (6 ft 2 in)
- Position: Left winger

Senior career*
Years	Team	Apps	(Gls)
2012–2013	Ventspils II	10	(2)
2013–2017	BFC Daugavpils	59	(7)
2015	→ Lech Poznań II (loan)	4	(0)
2017–2018	FS Metta/Latvijas Universitāte	51	(8)
2019–2021	Riga	65	(5)
2022	RFS	11	(0)
2023–2024	FS Metta/Latvijas Universitāte	29	(2)

International career
2012	Latvia U17	2	(0)
2014	Latvia U19	2	(0)
2017–2018	Latvia U21	12	(2)
2018–2021	Latvia	14	(1)
- * Club domestic league appearances and goals as of 18 November 2023

Vladislavs Fjodorovs (born 27 September 1996) is a Latvian professional footballer who plays as a left winger.

== Club career ==
Born in Daugavpils, Fjodorovs has played club football for Ventspils II, BFC Daugavpils, Lech Poznań II and FS METTA/Latvijas Universitāte.

Fjodorovs signed with Riga FC for the 2019 season for one year.

== International career ==
After playing for the Latvian youth teams from under-17 to under-21 levels, he made his senior international debut for the Latvia in 2018.

== Honours ==
Riga

- Virslīga: 2019, 2020
