= FK Alberts =

Latvian football club

Alberts
- Full name: Futbola klubs Alberts
- Founded: 29 September 2001; 24 years ago
- Ground: Salaspils stadium
- Chairman: Jānis Rubulis
- League: Latvian Third League
- 2016: 3rd (Vidzeme zone)
| Home colours | Away colours |

Futbola klubs Alberts is a Latvian football club, that competes in the Latvian Second League (2. līga), the third-highest league of Latvian football. The club was founded in 2001 and named after Alberts Šeibelis, Latvia national football team captain before World War II. Originally it was from the city of Riga. From 2008 to 2014 the team played its home matches at Carnikava, but from the 2016 season they play at Salaspils.

At the end of 2006 FK Alberts created a joint team with FK Auda, but also retained a team in the Second League Vidzeme zone under the name of "Vecais Alberts". In 2008 a new club JDFS Alberts was created on the basis of club's youth system. In 2009 the club returned to the name of FK Alberts continuing to play as an amateur team.

== League and Cup history ==
| Season | Division (Name) | Pos./Teams | Latvian Football Cup |
|---|---|---|---|
| 2002 | 3rd (2. līga - Vidzeme region) | 3/(13) | First round |
| 2003 | 3rd (2. līga - Vidzeme region) | 2/(9) | Second round |
| 2004 | 2nd (1.līga) | 13/(14) | Third round |
| 2005 | 2nd (1.līga) | 13/(14) | 1/8 finals |
| 2006 | 2nd (1.līga) | 15/(16) | Third round |
| 2007 | 3rd (2. līga - Vidzeme region) | 4/(10) | — |
| 2008 | 3rd (2. līga - Vidzeme region) | 1/(11) | First round |
| 2008 | 2. līga - Play-offs | 4th | First round |
| 2009 | 3rd (2. līga - Vidzeme region) | 9/(12) | First round |
| 2010 | 3rd (2. līga - Vidzeme region) | 9/(11) | First round |
| 2011 | 3rd (2. līga - Vidzeme region) | 5/(9) | Third round |
| 2012 | 3rd (2. līga - Vidzeme region) | 7/(10) | Third round |
| 2013 | 3rd (2. līga - Vidzeme region) | 7/(10) | Second round |
| 2014 | 3rd (2. līga - Vidzeme region) | 6/(6) | First round |
| 2015 | Did not participate | | First round |
| 2016 | 3rd (2. līga - Vidzeme region) | 3/(14) | Second round |
