= Aleksandrs Solovjovs =

Latvian footballer

Personal information
- Full name: Aleksandrs Solovjovs
- Date of birth: 25 February 1988 (age 38)
- Place of birth: Riga, Latvian SSR, USSR (now Republic of Latvia)
- Height: 1.78 m (5 ft 10 in)
- Positions: Attacking midfielder; second striker; left back

Youth career
- Skonto Riga

Senior career*
Years	Team	Apps	(Gls)
2007–2008	Skonto	0	(0)
2007–2008	→ Olimps Riga (loan)	24	(3)
2008–2010	Ventspils	15	(3)
2009	→ Tranzīts (loan)	11	(0)
2010–2011	Atromitos Yeroskipou	5	(0)
2011	Nantwich Town	18	(0)
2012	Tauras Tauragė	15	(2)
2012–2013	Jūrmala	13	(5)
2013	Spartaks Jūrmala	5	(0)
2013–2015	Daugava Daugavpils	42	(1)
2015–2016	FB Gulbene	3	(1)
2016–2017	Sillamäe Kalev	19	(1)
2017–2021	RFS	89	(7)

International career^{‡}
- Latvia U-17
- Latvia U-19
2007–2010	Latvia U-21	1	(0)
2017–2021	Latvia	11	(0)
- * Club domestic league appearances and goals as of 24 May 2026 (UTC) ‡ National team caps and goals as of 24 May 2026 (UTC).

Aleksandrs Solovjovs (born 25 February 1988) is a Latvian former footballer.

== Career ==
As a youth player Solovjovs played for Skonto Riga, making his first first-team appearance in 2007. Despite being in the club's player list for the upcoming season, Solovjovs didn't even play a match for Skonto, as he was loaned out to Olimps for one season. He played 24 matches, netting 3 times. After the end of that season, in February 2008, it was announced that he was to undergo a trial with Zenit St. Petersburg reserves. Later it was said that Aleksandrs had left a good impression, but he wasn't offered a contract that time. In 2008, he left Riga anyway, signing with FK Ventspils on 1 September. He played 15 matches there, scoring 3 times. In September 2009 Solovjovs had unsuccessful trials with English Premier League side Burnley, Scottish First Division Ross County, and U.S. Siracusa of Italian Serie C2 later on. At the end of 2009 Solovjovs appeared in the group stage matches of 2009–10 UEFA Europa League, also in the away draw against the German club Hertha BSC. In January 2010 it was reported that Solovjovs, along with fellow Ventspils teammate, Jevgēņijs Kosmačovs was on trial at English Championship side, Blackpool. He didn't stay with the club and was loaned to another Latvian club from the Ventspils city Tranzīts. He played 11 games there, scoring no goals. In August 2010, after returning from loan, Solovjovs was released from FK Ventspils because of contract infringement. He didn't stay without a club for a long time, just after 5 days signing for Atromitos Yeroskipou in Cyprus. He played there for half a year, fighting with injuries and personal problems. He was released from the Cypriot side at the start of 2011. During the start of the year Solovjovs had trials with many clubs abroad and in September 2011 he joined Nantwich Town in the English Northern Premier League. In 2012 Solovjovs signed a contract with the Lithuanian A Lyga club Tauras Tauragė. He played 15 matches, scoring 2 goals for them and left in the summer of 2012. Solovjovs then joined his home land club Jūrmala in the Latvian Higher League. Playing in Jūrmala during the 2012 season, Solovjovs scored 5 goals in 13 league matches for the club. In February 2013 he moved to the Latvian Higher League club Spartaks Jūrmala. Solovjovs played 5 matches for Spartaks during the 2013 season, joining that time Latvian champions Daugava Daugavpils before their UEFA Champions League campaign in July 2013.

== International career ==
Solovjovs has represented Latvia in all youth level national teams, including Latvia U-17, Latvia U-19 and Latvia U-21. He got called up for Latvian senior side and experienced his debut on 25 March 2017. Solovjovs played 90 minutes both in 2018 FIFA World Cup qualification 0:1 away loss to Switzerland and in friendly match against Georgia three days later.
