= Marko Regža =

Latvian footballer (born 1999)

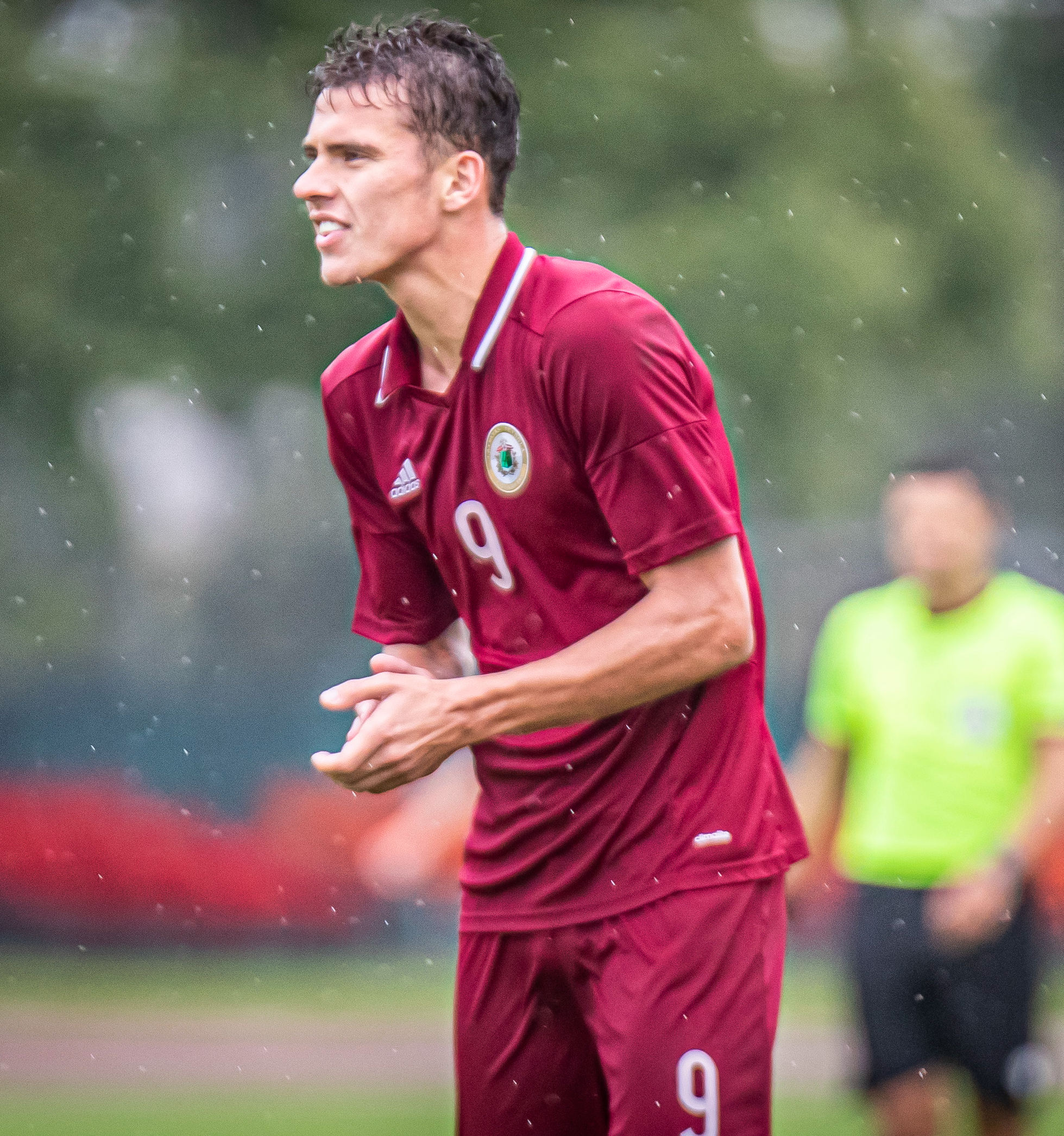

Personal information
- Date of birth: 20 January 1999 (age 27)
- Place of birth: Riga, Latvia
- Height: 1.95 m (6 ft 5 in)
- Position: Forward

Team information
- Current team: Hradec Králové
- Number: 18

Youth career
- –2010: SK Babīte
- 2010–2012: Fortuna Düsseldorf
- 2012–2014: Schalke 04

Senior career*
Years	Team	Apps	(Gls)
2016–2021	RFS	16	(1)
2019	→ Super Nova (loan)	8	(5)
2019–2020	→ BFC Daugavpils (loan)	26	(7)
2022	Super Nova	27	(8)
2023–2026	Riga	99	(53)
2026–	Hradec Králové	16	(0)

International career^{‡}
2023–	Latvia	16	(0)
- * Club domestic league appearances and goals as of 26 May 2026 ‡ National team caps and goals as of 16 November 2025

Marko Regža (born 20 January 1999) is a Latvian footballer who plays for Czech First League club Hradec Králové and the Latvia national team.

== Club career ==
Regža began his youth career with SK Babīte. At age 11, he and his family moved to Germany to join the academy of Fortuna Düsseldorf. He later moved to Schalke 04. He stayed with the club until age 15 when he was forced to return to Latvia because of injury.

He went on to join RFS of the Virslīga but was again troubled by injury. He eventually signed a contract with Riga FC through 31 December 2025. Regža had a breakout season in 2023 and reached second in the league scoring chart with eleven goals in nineteen matches at one point. Because of his play that season, he was linked with a move to Sint-Truidense V.V. of the Belgian Pro League.

On 5 January 2026, Regža signed a contract with Czech First League club Hradec Králové.

== International career ==
Regža made his senior international debut on 16 June 2023 in a UEFA Euro 2024 qualifying match against Turkey. Three days later, he appeared against Armenia in the same competition.

=== International career statistics ===
As of 19 June 2023

Latvian national team
Year	Apps	Goals
2023	2	0
Total	2	0
