= FK Auda =

Latvian football club

Auda
- Full name: Futbola klubs Auda
- Founded: 1969; 57 years ago
- Ground: Skonto Stadium; Mežaparks Sports Village, Rīga; Audas stadions, Ķekava, Latvia (some games)
- Capacity: 7,000 (Skonto)
- Owner: Andrey Vilenkin
- General Director: Fransis Žustēns Zodeugans
- Head coach: Didier Zanetti
- League: Virslīga
- 2025: Virslīga, 5th of 10
- Website: fkauda.lv
Home colours	Away colours	Third colours

Futbola klubs Auda (FK Auda) is a Latvian professional football club, playing in the Latvian Higher League, the highest division of domestic football. They are based in Ķekava, near the capital Riga, however, recently they have been playing most games in stadiums in Riga. Auda won their first ever major trophy in the final of the 2022 Latvian Cup, repeating this in 2025.

== History ==
The history of Auda goes back to 1969, when the football team of the fishing kolkhoz 9. maijs first appeared in the lower divisions of the Soviet Latvian championships. This team played its home matches at the Auda Stadium in Vecmīlgrāvis, Riga, later renamed the Alberts Šeibelis Stadium after the former Latvia national football team captain Alberts Šeibelis. The club played in the lower divisions of Latvian football, its only seasons in the top league came in 1986–1987 but those also did not bring good results.

After the restoration of the independence of Latvia, n 1991, after the collapse of the kolkhoz system, the kolkhoz was transformed into the joint stock company Auda, with the name of the football team being changed as well. In 1991, under the management of Valerijs Leitāns and Juris Docenko, Auda made its debut in the top division of the Latvian championships, the Virslīga. In a competition among 20 teams, Auda finished 15th. The following season, the former 1930s team RFK was refounded on the basis of the Auda squad. Under this name the team, including many young players, participated in the 1. līga (the second division of Latvian football) from 1992 to 1994. But results which would correspond to the name of RFK did not come, so in 1995 the team reverted to its former name of Auda. The following three years it played in the third division, the 2. līga.

In 1996, Auda was a completely new team which played in the 2. līga. In 1997, the young Auda players claimed the top spot in the table of their Latvian Second League zone, but in the finals in two games lost to the FK Valmiera reserve team, nevertheless gaining promotion to the 1. līga. After several years in the Latvian First League, Auda became league champions in 2001 and were promoted to the Virslīga. After three seasons in the top tier, in 2004 Auda was relegated back to the 1. līga for the next 17 years.

On 15 October 2005, Auda played its first game at its new 520-seat stadium, the Audas stadions, in Ķekava, the centre of Ķekava Municipality. In 2007, FK Auda and FK Alberts merged into a new club - FK Auda/Alberts, later going their separate ways.

After a long stint in the First League, FK Auda achieved promotion once again and returned to the Virslīga in 2022. On 19 October 2022, Auda won their first ever major trophy by beating RFS 1–0 in the final of the Latvian Cup. This also secured them European football for the first time in their history.

In the 2023 season, under Simo Valakari, Auda finished 3rd in the league and qualified for the 2024–25 UEFA Conference League qualifiers. At the end of the season, Valakari departed for Riga FC and Filipe Almeida from Portugal took over as the new head coach. Slovenian Zoran Zeljković led the team through the 2024 season, but was replaced by Jurģis Kalns before the start of the 2025 season. During this time, Auda switched from playing in Ķekava to the more spacious Skonto Stadium in Riga, with occasional home matches played in Mežaparks Sports Village in Mežaparks.

=== European record ===
As of match played 13 August 2026

Competition	GP	W	D	L	GF	GA	+/−
UEFA Conference League	14	8	3	3	21	18	+3
Total	14	8	3	3	21	18	+3

Season	Competition	Round	Club	Home	Away	Agg.
2023–24	UEFA Conference League	2QR	(Slovakia) Spartak Trnava	1–1	1–4	2–5
2024–25	UEFA Conference League	1QR	(Faroe Islands) B36 Tórshavn	2–0	1–0	3–0
2024–25	UEFA Conference League	2QR	(Northern Ireland) Cliftonville	2–0	2–1	4–1
2024–25	UEFA Conference League	3QR	(Kosovo) Drita	1–0	1–3 (a.e.t.)	2–3
2025–26	UEFA Conference League	1QR	(Northern Ireland) Larne	2–2 (a.e.t.)	0–0	2–2 (2–4 p)
2026–27	UEFA Conference League	2QR	(Romania) FCSB	4–1	3–2	7–3
2026–27	UEFA Conference League	3QR	(Albania) Dinamo City	1–0	0–4	1–4

Notes

- QR: Qualifying round

== Honours ==
- Latvian Cup
  - Winners (3): 2022, 2025, 2026
  - Runner-up (1): 2024
- Virslīga
  - 3rd place (2): 2023, 2024

== Players ==
=== First-team squad ===
As of 4 September 2026

Note: Flags indicate national team as defined under FIFA eligibility rules; some limited exceptions apply. Players may hold more than one non-FIFA nationality.

No.	Pos.	Nation	Player
1	GK	LAT	Raivo Stūriņš
2	DF	CRO	Tin Hrvoj
3	DF	LAT	Daniels Balodis
4	DF	CIV	Moussa Ouedraogo
6	DF	LAT	Ralfs Kragliks
7	FW	GHA	Andrews Appiah
8	MF	FRA	Edvin Bongemba
9	FW	SEN	Meleye Diagne (on loan from Riga)
10	MF	GAM	Wally Fofana
13	MF	LAT	Ratmirs Trifonovs
14	MF	NGR	Hussaini Ibrahim
17	FW	LAT	Eduards Dašķevičs
18	MF	PAN	Ariel Arroyo
19	FW	SEN	Sidy Koumé
20	MF	CIV	Youba Traore
21	MF	LAT	Roberts Bocs

No.	Pos.	Nation	Player
22	DF	NGR	Alexander Ogunji
23	MF	CIV	Mohamoud Fofana
25	FW	SEN	Barthélemy Diedhiou
26	FW	FRA	Hénoc Lusweki
29	GK	LAT	Niks Aleksandrovs
30	MF	ESP	Brian Peña
42	MF	BFA	Mohamed Fofana
46	MF	SUR	Jayen Gerold
47	FW	CIV	Kader Kone
71	DF	LAT	Oskars Rubenis
77	MF	LAT	Jevgenijs Miņins
79	MF	CIV	Ibrahim Kone
80	DF	PER	Sebastián Aranda (on loan from Sport Boys)
98	GK	LAT	Nils Toms Puriņš
-	FW	BRA	Thauan

=== Out on loan ===
Note: Flags indicate national team as defined under FIFA eligibility rules; some limited exceptions apply. Players may hold more than one non-FIFA nationality.

No.	Pos.	Nation	Player
