= FK Spartaks Jūrmala =

Association football club in Latvia

Spartaks Jūrmala
- Full name: Futbola klubs Spartaks
- Nickname: Sarkanbaltie (Red-whites)
- Founded: 2007; 18 years ago
- Ground: Sloka Stadium
- Capacity: 2,500
- Chairman: Spartaks Melkumjans
- Manager: Oskars Kļava
- League: Virslīga
- 2022: 8th
- Website: www.fkspartaks.lv
| Home colours | Away colours |

FK Spartaks is an inactive Latvian football club that was based in Sloka, Jūrmala. In 2012, they finished 3rd in the Latvian First League championship and after winning the play-offs against JFK Olimps were promoted to the Latvian Higher League. The club played its home matches at the Sloka Stadium with capacity of 2,500 people.

== History ==
FK Spartaks Jūrmala were founded at the start of 2007 as participants of the third tier of Latvian football, the 2. līga. They won the Latvian Second League championship in the first year of their existence, and the next 4 seasons were spent in the Latvian First League.

In 2011, the club made its greatest leap since its foundation, managing to finish the season in the third position right behind Metta/Latvijas Universitāte and Liepājas Metalurgs-2. As reserve teams were not eligible to participate in the top tier championship, Spartaks were promoted via play-offs against JFK Olimps, which they won 4–1 on aggregate. Since 2012 Spartaks Jūrmala have been playing in the Latvian Higher League. Spartaks finished their first season in the Latvian top-tier football in the fifth position of the league table, remaining in a middle-table position in the following two seasons as well, placing 7th in 2013 and 6th in 2014, respectively.

FK Spartaks had an engagement with the Jūrmala Swimming and Football School, the name of which was occasionally included in the name of the club (Jūrmalas Peldēšanas un Futbola skola, JPFS) since 2012.

From 2012 to 2014 Spartaks Jūrmala was one of two clubs representing the city in the Latvian Higher League and using the Sloka Stadium as their home-ground. After the relegation of FC Jūrmala in 2014, Spartaks was the sole representative of the coastal city in Latvian top-tier football.

In the 2022 Latvian Higher League season, Spartaks Jūrmala finished 8th, remaining in the Virslīga. However, on 30 January 2023 the club withdrew their application for the 2023 Latvian Higher League LFF A licence. Spartaks Jūrmala applied for the LFF B licence for participation in the 2023 Optibet Nākotnes līga, but were refused due to not meeting financial requirements. Due to mounting financial difficulties, many players had already left the team, and it was reported that a last-ditch attempt to sell the club to ensure its survival had failed.

After this, the team folded and Spartaks Jūrmala received a transfer ban in May 2023. Currently the club is inactive, but is still registered as a legal entity.

== Honours ==
- Latvian Higher League champions (2)
  - 2016, 2017
- Latvian Second League champions (1)
  - 2007
- Latvian First League play-off winners (1)
  - 2011
- Sports Club of the Year in Jūrmala (1)
  - 2011

== Managers ==
| Name | Period |
|---|---|
| (Latvia) Sergejs Golubevs | 2007–09 |
| (Latvia) Pjotrs Trebuhovs | 2010 |
| (Latvia) Artūrs Šketovs | 2011 |
| (Latvia) Oļegs Blagonadeždins | 2012 |
| (Lithuania) Arminas Narbekovas | 23 July 2012 – 31 December 2012 |
| (Belarus) Oleg Kubarev | 8 February 2013 – 28 July 2013 |
| (Latvia) Aleksandrs Stradiņš | Jul 2013 – Sept 2013 (caretaker) |
| (Latvia) Jurijs Popkovs | Sept 2013 – Dec 2013 |
| (Italy) Fabio Micarelli | Dec 2013 – May 2014 |
| (Latvia) Oļegs Blagonadeždins | Jun 2014 (caretaker) |
| (Ukraine) Roman Pylypchuk | Jun 2014 – Jan 2016 |
| (Belarus) Oleg Kubarev | Jan 2016 – Nov 2016 |
| (Poland) Marek Zub | Feb 2017–July 2017 |
| (Slovakia) Jozef Vukušič | July 2017 |
| (Lithuania) Valdas Urbonas | 2017 |
| (Uzbekistan) Samvel Babayan | 2018 |
| (Latvia) Dmitrijs Kalašņikovs | 2018 |
| (Russia) Aleksandr Grishin | April 2018–August 2018 |
| (Lithuania) Tomas Ražanauskas | August 2018–December 2018 |
| (Italy) Nunzio Zavettieri | January 2019 |
| (Russia) (Finland) Aleksei Yeryomenko | February 2020–January 2021 |
| (Poland) Marek Zub | January 2021–June 2021 |
| (Poland) Przemyslaw Lagozny | June 2021–May 2022 |
| (Portugal) Fabiano Flora | May 2022–July 2022 |
| (Spain) Víctor Basadre | July 2022–October 2022 |
| (Latvia) Oskars Kļava | October 2022–2023 |

== League and Cup history ==
| Season | Division (Name) | Pos./Teams | Pl. | W | D | L | GS | GA | P | Latvian Football Cup |
|---|---|---|---|---|---|---|---|---|---|---|
| 2007 | 3rd (2. līga) | 1/(11) | | | | | | | | 1/32 Round |
| 2008 | 2nd (1.līga) | 11/(15) | 28 | 9 | 6 | 13 | 32 | 44 | 33 | 1/8 finals |
| 2009 | 2nd (1.līga) | 12/(14) | 26 | 4 | 2 | 20 | 22 | 71 | 14 | did not participate |
| 2010 | 2nd (1.līga) | 9/(12) | 22 | 6 | 4 | 12 | 32 | 41 | 22 | did not participate |
| 2011 | 2nd (1.līga) | 3/(13) | 24 | 16 | 4 | 4 | 74 | 22 | 52 | 1/8 finals |
| 2012 | 1st (Virslīga) | 5/(10) | 36 | 13 | 10 | 13 | 61 | 56 | 49 | 1/4 finals |
| 2013 | 1st (Virslīga) | 7/(10) | 27 | 7 | 4 | 16 | 30 | 49 | 25 | 1/8 finals |
| 2014 | 1st (Virslīga) | 6/(10) | 36 | 14 | 9 | 13 | 38 | 32 | 51 | 1/4 finals |
| 2015 | 1st (Virslīga) | 5/(8) | 24 | 5 | 6 | 13 | 20 | 36 | 21 | 1/2 finals |
| 2016 | 1st (Virslīga) | 1/(8) | 28 | 17 | 4 | 7 | 46 | 22 | 55 | Final |
| 2017 | 1st (Virslīga) | 1/(7) | 24 | 14 | 4 | 6 | 36 | 26 | 46 | 1/2 finals |
| 2018 | 1st (Virslīga) | 5/(8) | 28 | 12 | 6 | 10 | 48 | 37 | 42 | 1/4 finals |
| 2019 | 1st (Virslīga) | 5/(9) | 32 | 13 | 5 | 14 | 49 | 64 | 44 | 1/8 finals |

== European record ==
=== Matches ===
| Season | Competition | Round | Club | Home | Away | Aggregate |
|---|---|---|---|---|---|---|
| 2015–16 | UEFA Europa League | 1Q | (Montenegro) Budućnost Podgorica | 0–0 | 3–1 | 3–1 |
| 2015–16 | UEFA Europa League | 2Q | (Serbia) Vojvodina | 1–1 | 0–3 | 1–4 |
| 2016–17 | UEFA Europa League | 1Q | (Belarus) Dinamo Minsk | 0–2 | 1–2 | 1–4 |
| 2017–18 | UEFA Champions League | 2Q | (Kazakhstan) Astana | 0–1 | 1–1 | 1–2 |
| 2018–19 | UEFA Champions League | 1Q | (Serbia) Red Star Belgrade | 0−0 | 0−2 | 0–2 |
| 2018–19 | UEFA Europa League | 2Q | (San Marino) La Fiorita | 6−0 | 3−0 | 9−0 |
| 2018–19 | UEFA Europa League | 3Q | (Lithuania) Sūduva Marijampolė | 0−1 | 0–0 | 0–1 |

Notes

- 1Q: First qualifying round
- 2Q: Second qualifying round
- 3Q: Third qualifying round

== Sponsors ==
Sponsors

(Latvia) Jūrmalas Pilsētas Dome
(Germany) Hanseatisches Fußball Kontor GmbH
(Latvia) Sportland

Kit manufacturer

(United States) Nike Inc.

== Players and staff ==
As of 1 November 2022

=== Current squad ===
Note: Flags indicate national team as defined under FIFA eligibility rules; some limited exceptions apply. Players may hold more than one non-FIFA nationality.

| No. | Pos. | Nation | Player |
|---|---|---|---|
| 1 | GK | LVA | Dāvis Veisbuks |
| 2 | DF | LVA | Klavs Kramens |
| 3 | DF | LVA | Timurs Azarovs |
| 4 | MF | LVA | Deniss Meļņiks |
| 5 | MF | LVA | Danila Patijcuks |
| 7 | MF | GHA | Kwadwo Asamoah |
| 8 | MF | LVA | Vladislavs Soloveičiks |
| 10 | FW | LVA | Daniils Hvoinickis |
| 11 | MF | RUS | Valentin Zekhov |
| 12 | GK | LVA | Konstantīns Maculevičs |
| 13 | MF | FIN | Adam Markhiyev |

| No. | Pos. | Nation | Player |
|---|---|---|---|
| 15 | MF | LVA | Raivis Skrebels |
| 16 | DF | LVA | Daniels Grauds |
| 17 | FW | LVA | Artjoms Zamullo |
| 18 | MF | LVA | Kristians Godiņš |
| 20 | MF | UKR | Yaroslav Terekhov |
| 21 | GK | LVA | Iļja Isajevs |
| 22 | MF | LVA | Artūrs Ļotčikovs |
| 23 | DF | LVA | Deņiss Rogovs |
| 26 | FW | LVA | Artūrs Ostapenko |
| 27 | DF | LVA | Aleksandrs Solovjovs |

=== Out on loan ===
Note: Flags indicate national team as defined under FIFA eligibility rules; some limited exceptions apply. Players may hold more than one non-FIFA nationality.

| No. | Pos. | Nation | Player |
|---|---|---|---|
| — | DF | NGA | Lucky Opara (on loan at Narva Trans) |
| — | MF | NGA | Aliyu Yau Adam (on loan at Hapoel Acre) |
| — | MF | NGA | Luiz Igbineweka (on loan at Mosta) |

| No. | Pos. | Nation | Player |
|---|---|---|---|
| — | FW | NGA | Sunday Akinbule (on loan at Mosta) |
| — | FW | NCA | Ariagner Smith (on loan at Panevėžys) |

=== Staff ===
| Name, surname | Position |
|---|---|
| (Latvia) Seržiks Melkumjans | President |
| (Latvia) Spartaks Melkumjans | Chairman |
| (Russia) Alexei Eremenko Sr. | Manager |
| (Lithuania) Saulius Cekanavičius | Assistant manager |
| (Latvia) Aleksandrs Proskurņins | Goalkeeper coach |
| (Latvia) Pāvels Fjodorovs | Administrator |
| (Moldova) Stefan Botezatu | Physiotherapist |
