= Estonia national football team results (1991–2009) =

This is a list of the Estonia national football team results from 1991 to 2009.

== Results ==
=== 1991 ===
15 November 1991 Baltic Cup; Unofficial	Lithuania	4–1	Estonia	Žalgiris Stadium, Klaipėda
	Vitkovskis 17'; Ramelis 34'; Urbonas 54' (pen.); Magdisauskas 69'	Report	Kirs 14'	Attendance: 200; Referee: Roman Lajuks (Latvia)

16 November 1991 Baltic Cup; Unofficial	Latvia	2–0	Estonia	Žalgiris Stadium, Klaipėda
	Sproģis 42'; Troickis 79'	Report		Attendance: 200; Referee: Gintaras Dilda (Lithuania)

=== 1992 ===
3 June Friendly	Estonia	1–1	Slovenia	Kadrioru Stadium, Tallinn
19:00 UTC+2	Puštov 7'	Report	Benedejčič 73'	Attendance: 3,500; Referee: Eero Aho (Finland)

10 July 1992 Baltic Cup	Latvia	2–1	Estonia	Daugava Stadium, Liepāja
	Linards 34', 40'	Report	Olumets 78'	Attendance: 1,500; Referee: Anatolijus Rezepovas (Lithuania)

11 July 1992 Baltic Cup	Lithuania	1–1	Estonia	Daugava Stadium, Liepāja
	Slekys 27'	Report	Olumets 64'	Attendance: 500; Referee: Romāns Lajuks (Latvia)

16 August 1994 World Cup qualifier	Estonia	0–6	Switzerland	Kadrioru Stadium, Tallinn
18:00 UTC+3		Report	Chapuisat 19', 66'; Bregy 28'; Knup 46', 65'; Sforza 84'	Attendance: 2,412; Referee: Michał Listkiewicz (Poland)

25 October 1994 World Cup qualifier	Malta	0–0	Estonia	Ta' Qali Stadium, Valletta
15:00 UTC+1		Report		Attendance: 10,110; Referee: Oğuz Sarvan (TUR)

=== 1993 ===
20 February Friendly	Finland	0–0 (4–3 p)	Estonia	Myyrmäki Indoor Hall, Vantaa
		Report		Attendance: 1,000; Referee: Hirviniemi (FIN)
Note: Played indoors at the Indoor Baltic Cup.

21 February Friendly	Latvia	2–0	Estonia	Myyrmäki Indoor Hall, Vantaa
	Bulders 28'; Semjonovs 35'	Report		Attendance: 100; Referee: Oskarsson (FIN)
Note: Played indoors at the Indoor Baltic Cup.

7 April Friendly	Slovenia	2–0	Estonia	ŽŠD Stadion, Ljubljana
	Zulič 13'; Udovič 14'	Report		Attendance: 2,500; Referee: Wieser (AUT)

14 April 1994 World Cup qualifier	Italy	2–0	Estonia	Stadio Nereo Rocco, Trieste
	Baggio 21'; Signori 87'	Report		Attendance: 33,000; Referee: Piler (HUN)

12 May 1994 World Cup qualifier	Estonia	0–1	Malta	Kadrioru Stadium, Tallinn
		Report	Laferla 16'	Attendance: — Referee: Merk (GER)

19 May 1994 World Cup qualifier	Estonia	0–3	Scotland	Kadrioru Stadium, Tallinn
		Report	Gallacher 44'; Collins 60'; Booth 73'	Attendance: 5,100; Referee: Hollung (NOR)

2 June 1994 World Cup qualifier	Scotland	3–1	Estonia	Pittodrie Stadium, Aberdeen
	McClair 19', 28'; Nevin 73' (pen.)	Report	Bragin 57'	Attendance: 14,307; Referee: Uzunov (BUL)

2 July 1993 Baltic Cup	Estonia	0–2	Latvia	Pärnu Kalevi Stadium, Pärnu
		Report	Astafjevs 52'; Sarando 80'	Attendance: 300; Referee: Chelnokov (EST)

4 July 1993 Baltic Cup	Estonia	2–1	Lithuania	Pärnu Kalevi Stadium, Pärnu
	Zamorski 25'; Bragin 39'	Report	Olšanskis 60'	Attendance: 800; Referee: Lajuks (LAT)

5 September 1994 World Cup qualifier	Estonia	0–2	Portugal	Kadrioru Stadium, Tallinn
		Report	Rui Costa 31'; Folha 76'	Attendance: 2,750; Referee: Koho (FIN)

22 September 1994 World Cup qualifier	Estonia	0–3	Italy	Kadrioru Stadium, Tallinn
		Report	Baggio 20' (pen.), 76'; Mancini 61'	Attendance: 5,350; Referee: Damgaard (DEN)

26 October Friendly	Liechtenstein	0–2	Estonia	Sportplatz Rheinau, Balzers
		Report	Bragin; Rajala	Attendance: 1,200; Referee: Grabher (AUT)

10 November 1994 World Cup qualifier	Portugal	3–0	Estonia	Estádio da Luz, Lisbon
	Futre 2'; Oceano 37' (pen.); Rui Águas 86'	Report		Attendance: 11,000; Referee: Blareau (BEL)

17 November 1994 World Cup qualifier	Switzerland	4–0	Estonia	Hardturm, Zürich
	Knup 31'; Herr 34'; Ohrel 45'; Chapuisat 61'	Report		Attendance: 21,000; Referee: Petrović (YUG)

=== 1994 ===
9 March Friendly	Cyprus	2–0	Estonia	Paralimni Stadium, Paralimni
	Agathokleous 44'; Andreou 54' (pen.)	Report		Attendance: 1,000; Referee: Loizou (CYP)

7 May Friendly	United States	4–0	Estonia	Titan Stadium, Fullerton
	Klopas 36'; Reyna 41'; Balboa 76'; Moore 87'	Report		Attendance: 2,158; Referee: Patlak (United States)

23 May Friendly	Estonia	1–2	Wales	Kadrioru Stadium, Tallinn
	Reim 86'	Report	Rush 56'; Phillips 83'	Attendance: 3,500; Referee: Lajuks (LAT)

1 June Friendly	North Macedonia	2–0	Estonia	City Stadium, Skopje
	Boskovski 12'; Kanatlarovski 36'	Report		Attendance: 10,000; Referee: Momirov (BUL)

29 July 1994 Baltic Cup	Lithuania	3–0	Estonia	Žalgiris Stadium, Vilnius
	Ivanauskas 11' (pen.), 23'; Mikalajūnas 61'	Report		Attendance: 1,000; Referee: Lajuks (LAT)

30 July 1994 Baltic Cup	Estonia	0–2	Latvia	Žalgiris Stadium, Vilnius
		Report	Astafjevs 31'; Bulders 37'	Attendance: 250; Referee: Dubinskas (LTU)

16 August Friendly	Iceland	4–0	Estonia	Akureyrarvöllur, Akureyri
	Örlygsson 18', 39', 43'; Gudjónsson 54'	Report		Attendance: 1,470; Referee: Pedersen (NOR)

4 September Euro 1996 qualifier	Estonia	0–2	Croatia	Kadrioru Stadium, Tallinn
		Report	Šuker 45', 69'	Attendance: 1,250; Referee: Krondl (CZE)

8 October Euro 1996 qualifier	Estonia	0–2	Italy	Kadrioru Stadium, Tallinn
		Report	Panucci 20'; Casiraghi 77'	Attendance: 4,000; Referee: Werner Müller (SUI)

26 October Friendly	Estonia	0–7	Finland	Kadrioru Stadium, Tallinn
		Report	Eriksson 5'; Ruhanen 19', 40'; Sumiala 29', 60'; Hjelm 32', 39'	Attendance: 500; Referee: Lajuks (LAT)

6 November Friendly	Latvia	0–0	Estonia	FK Ozolnieki Stadium, Ozolnieki
		Report		Attendance: 400; Referee: Lajuks (LAT)

13 November Euro 1996 qualifier	Ukraine	3–0	Estonia	Olimpiysky, Kyiv
	Bezhenar 32'; Kirs 45' (o.g.); Huseinov 72'	Report		Attendance: 7,000; Referee: Schelings (BEL)

=== 1995 ===
4 January 1995 Ho Chi Min City Tournament	Vietnam	1–0	Estonia	Thong Nhat Stadium, Ho Chi Minh City
	Nguyễn Sỹ Long 66'	Report		Attendance: 12,060; Referee: —

6 February Friendly	Norway	7–0	Estonia	GSZ Stadium, Larnaca
	Jakobsen 4', 73'; Bohinen 13', 58'; Brattbakk 48', 89'; Halle 57'	Report		Attendance: 100; Referee: Papaioannou (CYP)

15 February Friendly	Cyprus	3–1	Estonia	GSZ Stadium, Larnaca
	Gogić 16'; Engomitis 83'; Larkou 85'	Report	Reim 76'	Attendance: 500; Referee: Ioannou (CYP)

25 March Euro 1996 qualifier	Italy	4–1	Estonia	Stadio Arechi, Salerno
	Zola 45', 65'; Albertini 58'; Ravanelli 82'	Report	Reim 72'	Attendance: 38,000; Referee: Philippi (LUX)

29 March Euro 1996 qualifier	Slovenia	3–0	Estonia	Ljudski vrt, Maribor
	Zahovič 40'; Gliha 52'; Kokol 90'	Report		Attendance: 1,850; Referee: Pratas (POR)

26 April Euro 1996 qualifier	Estonia	0–1	Ukraine	Kadrioru Stadium, Tallinn
		Report	Huseinov 17'	Attendance: 1,700; Referee: Hollung (NOR)

19 May 1995 Baltic Cup	Latvia	2–0	Estonia	Daugava Stadium, Riga
	Zeiberliņš 37'; Ivanovs 67'	Report		Attendance: 300; Referee: Sliva (LTU)

20 May 1995 Baltic Cup	Lithuania	7–0	Estonia	Daugava Stadium, Riga
18:00 (UTC+3:00)	Skarbalius 27'; Baltušnikas 34'; Preikšaitis 36'; Upstas 57'; Zuta 62'; Žvingilas 75'; Poderis 88'	Report		Attendance: 1,500; Referee: Lajuks (LAT)

11 June Euro 1996 qualifier	Estonia	1–3	Slovenia	Kadrioru Stadium, Tallinn
	Reim 26'	Report	Novak 38', 69'; Zahovič 80'	Attendance: 1,100; Referee: Durkin (ENG)

16 August Euro 1996 qualifier	Estonia	0–1	Lithuania	Kadrioru Stadium, Tallinn
		Report	Maciulevičius 48'	Attendance: 2,000; Referee: Nilsson (SWE)

3 September Euro 1996 qualifier	Croatia	7–1	Estonia	Maksimir Stadium, Zagreb
	Mladenović 3'; Šuker 19' (pen.), 58', 89'; Bokšić 29'; Boban 41'; Štimac 81'	Report	Reim 17'	Attendance: 20,000; Referee: Huzu (ROM)

11 October Euro 1996 qualifier	Lithuania	5–0	Estonia	Žalgiris Stadium, Vilnius
	Maciulevičius 8'; Šuika 13', 39'; Šlekys 44'; Ivanauskas 62'	Report		Attendance: 2,500; Referee: Pauchard (FRA)

=== 1996 ===
16 February Friendly	Estonia	0–0	Azerbaijan	GSZ Stadium, Larnaca
		Report		Attendance: 50; Referee: Loizou (CYP)

20 February Friendly	Cyprus	1–0	Estonia	Tsirion Stadium, Limassol
	Konstantinou 21'	Report		Attendance: 50; Referee: Kapitanis (CYP)

24 February Friendly	Estonia	2–2	Faroe Islands	GSZ Stadium, Larnaca
	Kristal 13'; Rajala 45'	Report	Johannesen 30'; Jarnskor 45'	Attendance: 2,000; Referee: Kyprianides (CYP)

24 April Friendly	Estonia	0–3	Iceland	Kadrioru Stadium, Tallinn
		Report	B. Gunnlaugsson 6', 20', 30'	Attendance: 500; Referee: Lajuks (LAT)

29 May Friendly	Estonia	0–0	Turkey	Kadrioru Stadium, Tallinn
		Report		Attendance: 1,700; Referee: Keltanen (FIN)

7 July 1996 Baltic Cup	Estonia	1–1	Latvia	Kreenholmi Stadium, Narva
18:00 (UTC+3:00)	U. Rooba 36'	Report	Bulders 16'	Attendance: 350; Referee: Dilda (LTU)

9 July 1996 Baltic Cup	Estonia	1–1	Lithuania	Kreenholmi Stadium, Narva
18:00 (UTC+3:00)	Reim 21' (pen.)	Report	Žvingilas 18'	Attendance: 1,000; Referee: Braga (LAT)

31 August 1998 World Cup qualifier	Belarus	1–0	Estonia	Dinamo Stadium, Minsk
	Makowski 35'	Report		Attendance: 7,500; Referee: Khusainov (RUS)

5 October 1998 World Cup qualifier	Estonia	1–0	Belarus	Kadrioru Stadium, Tallinn
	Hohlov-Simson 51'	Report		Attendance: 1,500; Referee: O'Hanlon (IRL)
Note: First win in an official match for Estonia since defeating Lithuania on 26 October 1993 in a friendly.

30 October Friendly	Finland	2–2	Estonia	Arto Tolsa Areena, Kotka
	Grönlund 74'; Pohja 88'	Report	M. Rooba 65'; Kirs 80'	Attendance: 925; Referee: Lajuks (LAT)

13 November Friendly	Andorra	1–6	Estonia	Estadi Comunal, Andorra la Vella
	Pol 61'	Report	Zelinski 36'; Arbeiter 64', 74', 76', 84'; Kristal 87'	Attendance: 1,500; Referee: Gracía Redondo (ESP)

16 November 1996 Friendly	Estonia	3–0	Indonesia	Stadio Luigi Ferraris, Genoa
	Zelinski 6', 45', 71'	Report		Attendance: 1,500; Referee: Pieri (ITA)

26 December 1996 Friendly	Basque Country	3–0	Estonia	Bilbao
20:30 CET	Ziganda 33'; Idiakez 61' Andrinúa 70'	Report		Stadium: San Mamés; Referee: Xabier Losantos Omar
Note: Estonia played the non-FIFA Basque Country; this did not contribute to ranking points or individual cap totals.

=== 1997 ===
26 January Friendly	Lebanon	2–0	Estonia	Beirut Municipal Stadium, Beirut
	Malikian 75'; Nazha 82'	Report		Attendance: 10,000; Referee: Ramadan (LIB)

11 February 1998 World Cup qualifier	Estonia	0–0	Scotland	Stade Louis II, Monte Carlo
		Report		Attendance: 3,766; Referee: Miroslav Radoman (YUG)
Note: This match was originally scheduled for 9 October 1996 but was not played because the Estonia team did not arrive at the time appointed by FIFA. The Organising Committee for the FIFA World Cup decided the match should be rescheduled.

1 March Friendly	Azerbaijan	0–2	Estonia	GSZ Stadium, Larnaca
		Report	Kristal 35'; Zelinski 76'	Attendance: 50; Referee: Antonis Panayiotou (CYP)

29 March 1998 World Cup qualifier	Scotland	2–0	Estonia	Rugby Park, Kilmarnock
	Boyd 25'; Meet 52' (o.g.)	Report		Attendance: 17,966; Referee: Heynemann (GER)

30 April 1998 World Cup qualifier	Austria	2–0	Estonia	Ernst-Happel-Stadion, Vienna
	Vastic 48'; Stöger 87'	Report		Attendance: 27,500; Referee: Ancion (BEL)

18 May 1998 World Cup qualifier	Estonia	1–3	Latvia	Kadrioru Stadium, Tallinn
	Zelinski 5'	Report	Babičevs 53'; Jelisejevs 80'; Lemsalu 87' (o.g.)	Attendance: 2,500; Referee: Cvitkovic (CRO)

4 June Friendly	Estonia	1–0	Azerbaijan	Viljandi linnastaadion, Viljandi
	Kirs 73'	Report		Attendance: 1,500; Referee: Lajuks (LAT)

8 June 1998 World Cup qualifier	Estonia	2–3	Sweden	Kadrioru Stadium, Tallinn
	Oper 74'; Kristal 84'	Report	Dahlin 14'; Zetterberg 53'; Andersson 71'	Attendance: 2,500; Referee: Wojcik (POL)

22 June Friendly	Estonia	4–1	Andorra	Linnastaadion, Kuressaare
	Zelinski 22'; Lemsalu 28'; Oper 66'; Pari 88'	Report	Lima 67'	Attendance: 932; Referee: Karhunen (FIN)

9 July 1997 Baltic Cup	Lithuania	2–1	Estonia	Žalgiris Stadium, Vilnius
	Morinas 35'; Suliauskas 69' (pen.)	Report	Reim 77'	Attendance: 300; Referee: Lajuks (LAT)

10 July 1997 Baltic Cup	Estonia	1–2	Latvia	Žalgiris Stadium, Vilnius
	Kristal 15'	Report	Babičevs 30'; Pahars 50'	Attendance: 150; Referee: Dubinskas (LTU)

6 August Friendly	Estonia	0–2	Faroe Islands	Tamme Staadion, Tartu
		Report	Rasmussen 47'; Müller 70'	Attendance: 500; Referee: Sundell (SWE)

20 August 1998 World Cup qualifier	Estonia	0–3	Austria	Kadrioru Stadium, Tallinn
		Report	Polster 47', 69', 88'	Attendance: 1,600; Referee: Fassolis (GRE)

6 September 1998 World Cup qualifier	Latvia	1–0	Estonia	Daugava Stadium, Riga
	Zemļinskis 87' (pen.)	Report		Attendance: 2,500; Referee: Guntadze (GEO)

11 October 1998 World Cup qualifier	Sweden	1–0	Estonia	Råsunda Stadium, Stockholm
	Zetterberg 25'	Report		Attendance: 18,702; Referee: Ormandjiev (BUL)

27 November Friendly	Philippines	0–1	Estonia	PhilSports Football and Athletics Stadium, Manila
		Report	Kristal 46'	Attendance: 3,000; Referee: Andres (PHI)

=== 1998 ===
9 May Friendly	Mexico	6–0	Estonia	Stadio Enzo Mazotti, Montecatini Terme
	García Aspe 2' (pen.); Hernández 9', 52', 76'; Ordiales 37', 58'	Report		Attendance: 500; Referee: Bolognino (ITA)

16 May Friendly	Estonia	0–0	Azerbaijan	Viljandi linnastaadion, Viljandi
		Report		Attendance: 1,500; Referee: Hyytiä (FIN)

4 June Euro 2000 qualifier	Estonia	5–0	Faroe Islands	Kadrioru Stadium, Tallinn
	Viikmäe 12'; Reim 40'; Terehhov 75'; Oper 86'; Kirs 90'	Report		Attendance: 3,500; Referee: Ingvarsson (SWE)

22 June Friendly	Estonia	2–1	Andorra	Kuressaare Linnastaadion, Kuressaare
	Zelinski 29'; Oper 76'	Report	Lucendo 55'	Attendance: 1,000; Referee: Timofejev (EST)

25 June 1998 Baltic Cup	Estonia	0–2	Latvia	Valga linnastaadion, Valga
		Report	Pahars 19'; Babičevs 87'	Attendance: 300; Referee: Dubinskas (LTU)

28 June 1998 Baltic Cup	Estonia	0–0	Lithuania	Viljandi linnastaadion, Viljandi
		Report		Attendance: 400; Referee: Lajuks (LAT)

20 August Friendly	Estonia	0–1	Moldova	Spordikeskuse Staadion, Kohtla-Järve
		Report	Cleșcenco 68'	Attendance: 2,500; Referee: Timofejev (EST)

5 September Euro 2000 qualifier	Bosnia and Herzegovina	1–1	Estonia	Koševo Stadium, Sarajevo
	Barbarez 74'	Report	Hibić 29' (o.g.)	Attendance: 21,000; Referee: Agius (MLT)

23 September Friendly	Estonia	2–2	Egypt	Kadrioru Stadium, Tallinn
	Kirs 29'; Zelinski 43'	Report	Emam 77'; Hassan 87'	Attendance: 2,500; Referee: Lajuks (LAT)

10 October Euro 2000 qualifier	Scotland	3–2	Estonia	Tynecastle Stadium, Edinburgh
	Dodds 70', 85'; Hohlov-Simson 79' (o.g.)	Report	Hohlov-Simson 35'; Smirnov 76'	Attendance: 16,930; Referee: Bento Marques (POR)

14 October Euro 2000 qualifier	Czech Republic	4–1	Estonia	Na Stínadlech, Teplice
	Nedvěd 8'; Berger 20', 38'; Meet 45' (o.g.)	Report	Arbeiter 90+1'	Attendance: 13,500; Referee: Olafsson (ISL)

18 November Friendly	Georgia	3–1	Estonia	Boris Paichadze Stadium, Tbilisi
	Ashvetia 65', 85'; Janashia 72'	Report	Arbeiter 82'	Attendance: 28,000; Referee: Malaguradze (GEO)

21 November Friendly	Armenia	2–1	Estonia	Kotayk Stadium, Abovyan
	Barsegyan 8'; Simonyan 17'	Report	Zelinski 55'	Attendance: 1,500; Referee: Nalbandian (ARM)

28 November Friendly	Azerbaijan	2–1	Estonia	Mərkəzi Stadion, Ganja
	Sultanov 81'; Mammadov 87' (pen.)	Report	Kirs 68'	Attendance: 3,500; Referee: Mamedov (AZE)

=== 1999 ===
18 January Israel Football Association; 70th Anniversary Tournament	Israel	7–0	Estonia	Ramat Gan Stadium, Ramat Gan
	Nimni 17' (pen.); Tikva 29'; Harazi 31', 36'; Mizrahi 43'; Shitrit 81'; Talesnikov 87'	Report		Attendance: 800; Referee: Duhamel (FRA)

22 January Israel Football Association; 70th Anniversary Tournament	Norway	3–3	Estonia	Hapoel Umm al-Fahm F.C., Umm al-Fahm
	Solbakken 22'; Strand 56'; Carew 72'	Report	Reim 75' (pen.); Zelinski 82', 89'	Attendance: 3,000; Referee: Jakob (ISR)

3 March Friendly	Romania	2–0	Estonia	Arena Națională, Bucharest
	Ganea 15', 79'	Report		Attendance: 15,000; Referee: Lică (ROM)

6 March Friendly	Azerbaijan	2–2	Estonia	Neo GSZ Stadium, Larnaca
	Kurbanov 1'; Lychkin 30' (pen.)	Report	Viikmäe 46'; Saviauk 71'	Attendance: 100; Referee: Constantinou (CYP)

16 March Friendly	Cyprus	1–2	Estonia	Neo GSZ Stadium, Larnaca
	Christodoulou 81'	Report	Zelinski 59'; Terehhov 85'	Attendance: 200; Referee: Georghiou (CYP)

31 March Euro 2000 qualifier	Lithuania	1–2	Estonia	Žalgiris Stadium, Vilnius
	Fomenka 83'	Report	Terehhov 49', 77'	Attendance: 3,000; Referee: Trentalange (ITA)

5 June Euro 2000 qualifier	Estonia	0–2	Czech Republic	Kadrioru Stadium, Tallinn
		Report	Berger 45'; Koller 84'	Attendance: 2,900; Referee: Roca (ESP)

9 June Euro 2000 qualifier	Estonia	1–2	Lithuania	Kadrioru Stadium, Tallinn
	Oper 8'	Report	Ramelis 51'; Maciulevičius 56'	Attendance: 2,000; Referee: Albrecht (GER)

18 August Friendly	Estonia	2–0	Armenia	Pärnu Kalevi Stadium, Pärnu
	Kristal 79'; Ustritski 90'	Report		Attendance: 500; Referee: Kotter (EST)

4 September Euro 2000 qualifier	Faroe Islands	0–2	Estonia	Tórsvøllur, Tórshavn
		Report	Reim 88'; Piiroja 90'	Attendance: 2,300; Referee: Trivkovic (CRO)

8 September Euro 2000 qualifier	Estonia	0–0	Scotland	Kadrioru Stadium, Tallinn
		Report		Attendance: 5,000; Referee: Stuchlik (AUT)

9 October Euro 2000 qualifier	Estonia	1–4	Bosnia and Herzegovina	Kadrioru Stadium, Tallinn
	Oper 4'	Report	Baljić 42', 57', 67', 87'	Attendance: 1,200; Referee: Luinge (NED)

30 October Friendly	Iraq	1–1	Estonia	Al Jazira Stadium, Abu Dhabi
	Kadhim 30'	Report	Mahmoud 27' (o.g.)	Attendance: 12,000; Referee: Hamid (UAE)

1 November 1999 UAE Friendship Tournament	United Arab Emirates	2–2	Estonia	Al Jazira Stadium, Abu Dhabi
	Abdullah 31'; Salam Tumaa 81'	Report	Reim 19' (pen.); Oper 38'	Attendance: 8,500; Referee: Farid (UAE)

3 November 1999 UAE Friendship Tournament	Turkmenistan	1–1	Estonia	Al Jazira Stadium, Abu Dhabi
	Mukhadov 38'	Report	Viikmäe 47'	Attendance: 9,000; Referee: El-Barnaj (UAE)

18 December Friendly	Greece	2–2	Estonia	Trikala Stadium, Trikala
	Georgiadis 18'; Liberopoulos 52' (pen.)	Report	Oper 20', 41'	Attendance: 6,145; Referee: Derrien (FRA)

=== 2000 ===
20 February 2000 King's Cup; Unofficial	Brazil	0–1	Estonia	Rajamangala Stadium, Bangkok
		Report	Ustritski 80'	Attendance: 6,000
Note: Brazil played with its U17-team, and therefore the game is not a full FIFA international.

23 February 2000 King's Cup	Finland	4–2	Estonia	Rajamangala Stadium, Bangkok
	Kottila 12', 56'; Tuomela 14'; Kuqi 60'	Report	Zelinski 71' (pen.); Oper 84'	Attendance: 20,000; Referee: Abdul Halim Hamid (Malaysia)

25 February 2000 King's Cup	Thailand	2–1	Estonia	Rajamangala Stadium, Bangkok
	Thonkanya 23', 35'	Report	Reim 67' (pen.)	Attendance: 50,000; Referee: Abdul Halim Hamid (Malaysia)

27 February 2000 King's Cup Third place match Unofficial	Brazil	1–0	Estonia	Rajamangala Stadium, Bangkok
	Coradini Vivian 36'	[ Report]		Attendance: 6,000
Note: Brazil once again played with its U17-team, and therefore the game is not a full FIFA international.

26 April Friendly	Luxembourg	1–1	Estonia	Stade Josy Barthel, Luxembourg
	Vanek 90'	Report	Oper 84'	Attendance: 1,100; Referee: Roelof Luinge (Netherlands)

4 June Friendly	Estonia	2–0	Belarus	Kadrioru Stadium, Tallinn
17:00 UTC+2	Oper 82'	Report		Attendance: 550; Referee: Petteri Kari (Finland)

11 June Friendly	Estonia	1–0	Georgia	Kadrioru Stadium, Tallinn
	Piiroja 17'	Report		Attendance: 450; Referee: Sten Kaldma (Estonia)

16 August 2002 World Cup qualifier	Estonia	1–0	Andorra	Kadrioru Stadium, Tallinn
18:00 UTC+2	Reim 64' (pen.)	Report		Attendance: 1,695; Referee: Zoran Arsić (Yugoslavia)

3 September 2002 World Cup qualifier	Estonia	1–3	Portugal	Kadrioru Stadium, Tallinn
17:00 UTC+2	Oper 84'	Report	Rui Costa 15'; Figo 49'; Sá Pinto 57'	Attendance: 1,695; Referee: Charles Agius (Malta)

7 October 2002 World Cup qualifier	Andorra	1–2	Estonia	Estadi Comunal, Andorra la Vella
16:00 UTC+2	González 90+1' (pen.)	Report	Reim 54'; Oper 65'	Attendance: 650; Referee: Dani Koren (Israel)

11 October 2002 World Cup qualifier	Republic of Ireland	2–0	Estonia	Lansdowne Road, Dublin
19:30 UTC+1	Kinsella 25'; Dunne 50'	Report		Attendance: 34,962; Referee: Terje Hauge (Norway)

15 November Friendly	Estonia	1–0	Kyrgyzstan	Linnastaadion, Kuressaare
	Anniste 55'	Report		Attendance: 800; Referee: Timofejev (Estonia)

10 December Friendly	Hong Kong	1–2	Estonia	Hong Kong Stadium, Hong Kong
	Chan Ho-Man 20'	Report	Zelinski 53', 58'	Attendance: 1,500; Referee: Kacuhiko Matsumura (Japan)

=== 2001 ===
19 March Friendly	Egypt	3–3	Estonia	Cairo International Stadium, Cairo
	Abdel Latif 30'; Abdel Rahman 62'; Hosny 90'	Report	Oper 34'; Kristal 55'; Viikmäe 86'	Attendance: 3,500; Referee: Gamal Al-Ghandour (Egypt)

28 March 2002 World Cup qualifier	Cyprus	2–2	Estonia	Tsirion Stadium, Limassol
19:00 UTC+3	Konstantinou 47'; Okkas 65'	Report	Kristal 75'; Piiroja 77'	Attendance: 3,000; Referee: Tomasz Mikulski (Poland)

25 April Friendly	Moldova	0–0	Estonia	Stadionul Republican, Chişinău
17:00 UTC+3		Report		Attendance: 1,500; Referee: Viorel Anghelinei (Romania)

9 May Friendly	Estonia	1–1	Finland	Linnastaadion, Kuressaare
	Viikmäe 78'	Report	Rantanen 60'	Attendance: 1,700; Referee: Sipailo (Latvia)

2 June 2002 World Cup qualifier	Estonia	2–4	Netherlands	A. Le Coq Arena, Tallinn
19:00 UTC+2	Oper 65'; Zelinski 78'	Report	Piiroja 67' (o.g.); Van Nistelrooy 83', 90+2'; Kluivert 90'	Attendance: 9,323; Referee: Ceri Richards (Wales)
Note: First match in the A. Le Coq Arena in Tallinn

6 June 2002 World Cup qualifier	Estonia	0–2	Republic of Ireland	A. Le Coq Arena, Tallinn
18:30 UTC+2		Report	Dunne 7'; Holland 38'	Attendance: 9,300; Referee: Marian Salomir (Romania)

3 July 2001 Baltic Cup	Latvia	3–1	Estonia	Daugava Stadium, Riga
18:30 UTC+3	Verpakovskis 41'; Pahars 50'; Koļesņičenko 90'	Report	Zelinski 47'	Attendance: 1,500; Referee: Darius Miezelis (Lithuania)

4 July 2001 Baltic Cup	Lithuania	5–2	Estonia	Daugava Stadium, Riga
18:30 UTC+3	Buitkus 37'; Česnauskis 46'; Vasiliauskas 73'; Trakys 90'; Vilėniškis 90+1'	Report	Anniste 7'; Švets 35'	Attendance: 500; Referee: Roman Lajuks (Latvia)

15 August 2002 World Cup qualifier	Estonia	2–2	Cyprus	A. Le Coq Arena, Tallinn
19:00 UTC+2	Zelinski 51'; Novikov 86'	Report	Konstantinou 39' (pen.), 69'	Attendance: 5,000; Referee: Oleg Chikun (Belarus)

5 September 2002 World Cup qualifier	Netherlands	5–0	Estonia	Philips Stadion, Eindhoven
20:30 UTC+2	Zenden 16'; Van Bommel 26', 39'; Cocu 31'; Van Nistelrooy 44'	Report		Attendance: 28,500; Referee: Kyros Vassaras (Greece)

6 October 2002 World Cup qualifier	Portugal	5–0	Estonia	Estádio da Luz, Lisbon
18:00 UTC+1	João Pinto 29'; Nuno Gomes 49', 64'; Pauleta 58'; Luís Figo 78'	Report		Attendance: 77,000; Referee: Hartmut Strampe (Germany)

10 November Friendly	Greece	4–2	Estonia	Nikos Goumas Stadium, Athens
	Nikolaidis 6', 9'; Tsiartas 24'; Machlas 39'	Report	Viikmäe 44'; Zelinski 81' (pen.)	Attendance: 1,200; Referee: Roy Helge Olsen (Norway)

14 November Friendly	Estonia	0–0	Kazakhstan	A. Le Coq Arena, Tallinn
		Report		Attendance: 1,500; Referee: Margus Kotter (Estonia)

=== 2002 ===
14 March Friendly	Saudi Arabia	0–2	Estonia	Stadio Enzo Mazotti, Montecatini Terme
		Report	Zelinski 9'; Oper 51'	Attendance: 500; Referee: Paolo Dondarini (Italy)

27 March Friendly	Estonia	2–1	Russia	A. Le Coq Arena, Tallinn
18:00 UTC+2	Oper 10', 87'	Report	Beschastnykh 18'	Attendance: 4,500; Referee: Peter Fröjdfeldt (Sweden)

18 May Friendly	Poland	1–0	Estonia	Wójska Polskiego, Warsaw
20:00 UTC+2	Zurawski 56'	Report		Attendance: 8,500; Referee: Emil Božinovski (Macedonia)

21 May Friendly	San Marino	0–1	Estonia	Stadio Olimpico, Serravalle
		Report	Zelinski 36'	Attendance: 250; Referee: Paolo Dondarini (Italy)

3 July Friendly	Estonia	0–0	Azerbaijan	Linnastaadion, Kuressaare
		Report		Attendance: 2,200; Referee: Nicolai Vollquartz (Denmark)

7 July Friendly	Kazakhstan	1–1	Estonia	Almaty Central Stadium, Almaty
	Litvinenko 38'	Report	M. Rooba 42'	Attendance: 15,000; Referee: Sergei Kapanin (Kazakhstan)

21 August Friendly	Estonia	1–0	Moldova	A. Le Coq Arena, Tallinn
	Allas 54'	Report		Attendance: 1,500; Referee: Sten Kaldma (Estonia)

7 September Euro 2004 qualifier	Croatia	0–0	Estonia	Gradski vrt, Osijek
18:00 UTC+2		Report		Attendance: 10,766; Referee: Juan Antonio Fernández Marín (Spain)

12 October Friendly	Estonia	3–2	New Zealand	A. Le Coq Arena, Tallinn
14:00 UTC+3	Anniste 9'; Viikmäe 52'; Zelinski 81'	Report	Hickey 40'; Lines 44'	Attendance: 1,500; Referee: Rune Pedersen (Norway)

16 October Euro 2004 qualifier	Estonia	0–1	Belgium	A. Le Coq Arena, Tallinn
21:30 UTC+3		Report	Sonck 2'	Attendance: 3,900; Referee: Michael Riley (England)

20 November Friendly	Estonia	2–0	Iceland	A. Le Coq Arena, Tallinn
18:00 UTC+2	Viikmäe 75'; Oper 88'	Report		Attendance: 478; Referee: Ben Haverkort (Netherlands)

=== 2003 ===
9 February Friendly	Ecuador	1–0	Estonia	Estadio Modelo, Guayaquil
	Hurtado 89' (pen.)	Report		Attendance: 12,000; Referee: Ramos (ECU)

12 February Friendly	Ecuador	2–1	Estonia	Estadio Olímpico Atahualpa, Quito
	Baldeón 24', 48'	Report	Zahovaiko 67'	Attendance: 3,000; Referee: Moreno (ECU)

16 February Friendly	China	1–0	Estonia	Wuhan Sports Center, Wuhan
	Li Weifeng 67'	Report		Attendance: 20,000; Referee: Junjie Huang (CHN)

29 March Friendly	Estonia	2–1	Canada	A. Le Coq Arena, Tallinn
	Oper 72', 90+2'	Report	Stalteri 49'	Attendance: 2,500; Referee: Hansson (SWE)

2 April Euro 2004 qualifier	Estonia	0–0	Bulgaria	A. Le Coq Arena, Tallinn
		Report		Attendance: 4,000; Referee: Plautz (AUT)

30 April Euro 2004 qualifier	Andorra	0–2	Estonia	Estadi Comunal, Andorra la Vella
		Report	Zelinski 26', 74'	Attendance: 4,000; Referee: Aydin (TUR)

7 June Euro 2004 qualifier	Estonia	2–0	Andorra	A. Le Coq Arena, Tallinn
	Allas 22'; Viikmäe 31'	Report		Attendance: 3,500; Referee: Juhos (HUN)

11 June Euro 2004 qualifier	Estonia	0–1	Croatia	A. Le Coq Arena, Tallinn
		Report	N. Kovac 76'	Attendance: 6,100; Referee: Hamer (LUX)

3 July 2003 Baltic Cup	Estonia	1–5	Lithuania	Valga keskstaadion, Valga
	Sirel 57'	Report	Morinas 39'; D. Česnauskis 45'; Velička 72'; Bezykornovas 84'; E. Česnauskis 90'	Attendance: 1,500; Referee: Ingvarsson (SWE)

5 July 2003 Baltic Cup	Estonia	0–0	Latvia	A. Le Coq Arena, Tallinn
		Report		Attendance: 1,000; Referee: Ingvarsson (SWE)

20 August Friendly	Estonia	1–2	Poland	A. Le Coq Arena, Tallinn
	Lemsalu 90+3'	Report	Sobolewski 51'; Wichniarek 90+1'	Attendance: 4,500; Referee: Johanneson (SWE)

6 September Euro 2004 qualifier	Bulgaria	2–0	Estonia	Vasil Levski National Stadium, Sofia
	Petrov 16'; Berbatov 66'	Report		Attendance: 25,128; Referee: Wack (GER)

11 October Euro 2004 qualifier	Belgium	2–0	Estonia	Stade Sclessin, Liège
	Piiroja 44' (o.g.); Buffel 60'	Report		Attendance: 20,000; Referee: Busacca (SUI)

15 November Friendly	Albania	2–0	Estonia	Qemal Stafa, Tirana
	Aliaj 26'; Bushi 81'	Report		Attendance: 5,000; Referee: Douros (GRE)

19 November Friendly	Hungary	0–1	Estonia	Üllői út, Budapest
		Report	Rooba 86'	Attendance: 5,000; Referee: Šedivý (CZE)

17 December Friendly	Saudi Arabia	1–1	Estonia	Prince Mohamed bin Fahd Stadium, Dammam
	Tukar 28'	Report	Zahovaiko 41'	Referee: Al-Mehannah (KSA)

20 December Friendly	Oman	3–1	Estonia	Sultan Qaboos Sports Complex, Muscat
	Kaalma 6' (o.g.); Saleh 72'; Al-Dhabat 80'	Report	Zelinski 45'	Attendance: 1,200; Referee: Al-Harrasi (OMA)

=== 2004 ===
14 February 2004 Rothmans Cup	Estonia	2–1	Belarus	Ta' Qali Stadium, Valletta
	Rooba 13'; Lemsalu 45'	Report	Tarasenka 90'	Attendance: 200; Referee: Casha (MLT)
Note: Belarus played with its Belarus national under-21 football team, and therefore it was not an official FIFA game.

16 February 2004 Rothmans Cup	Malta	5–2	Estonia	Ta' Qali Stadium, Valletta
	Barbara 12', 60'; Said 28'; Turner 58'; Zahra 87'	Report	Zahovaiko 16'; Piiroja 45'	Attendance: 500; Referee: Orlic (MKD)

18 February 2004 Rothmans Cup	Moldova	0–1	Estonia	Ta' Qali Stadium, Valletta
		Report	Lindpere 58'	Attendance: 100; Referee: Sammut (MLT)

31 March Friendly	Estonia	0–1	Northern Ireland	A. Le Coq Arena, Tallinn
		Report	Healy 45'	Attendance: 2,900; Referee: Kari (FIN)

28 April Friendly	Estonia	1–1	Albania	A. Le Coq Arena, Tallinn
	Viikmäe 81'	Report	Aliaj 52'	Attendance: 4,200; Referee: Sipailo (LAT)

27 May Friendly	Estonia	0–1	Scotland	A. Le Coq Arena, Tallinn
		Report	McFadden 76'	Attendance: 5,000; Referee: Poulsen (DEN)

30 May Friendly	Estonia	2–2	Denmark	A. Le Coq Arena, Tallinn
	Viikmäe 77'; Lindpere 90'	Report	Tomasson 28'; Perez 79'	Attendance: 5,000; Referee: Bossen (NED)

6 June Friendly	Czech Republic	2–0	Estonia	Na Stínadlech, Teplice
	Baroš 6', 22'	Report		Attendance: 12,000; Referee: Brugger (AUT)

11 June Friendly	Estonia	2–4	Macedonia	A. Le Coq Arena, Tallinn
	Zahovaiko 54'; Teever 65'	Report	Sedloski 11'; Popov 15'; Pandev 31'; Grozdanovski 66'	Attendance: 2,200; Referee: Fröjdfeldt (SWE)

18 August 2006 World Cup qualifier	Liechtenstein	1–2	Estonia	Rheinpark, Vaduz
	D'Elia 49'	Report	Viikmäe 34'; Lindpere 80'	Attendance: 912; Referee: Bozinovski (MKD)

4 September 2006 World Cup qualifier	Estonia	4–0	Luxembourg	A. Le Coq Arena, Tallinn
	Teever 7'; Schauls 41' (o.g.); Oper 61'; Viikmäe 67'	Report		Attendance: 3,000; Referee: Kelly (IRL)

8 September 2006 World Cup qualifier	Portugal	4–0	Estonia	Estádio Dr. Magalhães Pessoa, Leiria
	Cristiano Ronaldo 75'; Postiga 84', 90'; Pauleta 87'	Report		Attendance: 27,214; Referee: Demirlek (TUR)

13 October 2006 World Cup qualifier	Latvia	2–2	Estonia	Skonto stadions, Riga
	Astafjevs 65'; Laizans 82'	Report	Oper 72'; Teever 79'	Attendance: 8,500; Referee: Meyer (GER)

17 November 2006 World Cup qualifier	Russia	4–0	Estonia	Kuban Stadium, Krasnodar
	Karyaka 23'; Izmailov 25'; Sychev 32'; Loskov 67' (pen.)	Report		Attendance: 28,000; Referee: Busacca (SUI)

30 November 2004 2004 King's Cup	Thailand	0–0 (4–3 p)	Estonia	Suphachalasai Stadium, Bangkok
		Report		Attendance: 35,000; Referee: Sukri (MAS)
	Penalties
	Chaiman (penalty scored); Puanakunmee (penalty missed); Jitkundot (penalty scored); Fuplook (penalty scored); Chaikamdee (penalty scored)		(penalty scored) Teever; (penalty scored) Kruglov; (penalty missed) Jääger; (penalty scored) Reinumäe; (penalty missed) Reim

2 December 2004 King's Cup	Hungary	5–0	Estonia	Suphachalasai Stadium, Bangkok
	Rósa 12'; Waltner 14'; Kerekes 19'; Rajczi 24'; Pollák 63'	Report		Attendance: 800; Referee: Tonghan (THA)

=== 2005 ===
9 February Friendly	Venezuela	3–0	Estonia	José Pachencho Romero, Maracaibo
	Páez 19'; Margiotta 32'; Maldonado 81'	Report		Attendance: 12,000; Referee: Luis Vasco (Ecuador)

26 March 2006 World Cup qualifier	Estonia	1–2	Slovakia	Lilleküla Stadium, Tallinn
18:00 UTC+2	Oper 58'	Report	Mintál 59'; Reiter 66'	Attendance: 3,051; Referee: Peter Fröjdfeldt (Sweden)

30 March 2006 World Cup qualifier	Estonia	1–1	Russia	Lilleküla Stadium, Tallinn
18:00 UTC+3	Terehhov 63'	Report	Arshavin 18'	Attendance: 8,354; Referee: Gianluca Paparesta (Italy)

20 April Friendly	Estonia	1–2	Norway	Lilleküla Stadium, Tallinn
18:00 UTC+3	Saharov 81'	Report	Johnsen 24'; Braaten 54'	Attendance: 4,000; Referee: Pieter Vink (Netherlands)

4 June 2006 World Cup qualifier	Estonia	2–0	Liechtenstein	Lilleküla Stadium, Tallinn
18:00 UTC+3	Stepanov 27'; Oper 57'	Report		Attendance: 3,000; Referee: Mark Whitby (Wales)

8 June 2006 World Cup qualifier	Estonia	0–1	Portugal	Lilleküla Stadium, Tallinn
20:15 UTC+3		Report	C. Ronaldo 33'	Attendance: 10,280; Referee: Mike Riley (England)

17 August Friendly	Estonia	1–0	Bosnia and Herzegovina	Lilleküla Stadium, Tallinn
19:00 UTC+3	Viikmäe 35'	Report		Attendance: 5,000; Referee: Peter Fröjdfeldt (Sweden)

3 September 2006 World Cup qualifier	Estonia	2–1	Latvia	Lilleküla Stadium, Tallinn
18:00 UTC+3	Oper 11'; Smirnov 71'	Report	Laizāns 90'	Attendance: 10,000; Referee: Alberto Undiano Mallenco (Spain)

8 October 2006 World Cup qualifier	Slovakia	1–0	Estonia	Tehelné pole, Bratislava
17:00 UTC+2	Hlinka 72'	Report		Attendance: 12,837; Referee: Paul Allaerts (Belgium)

12 October 2006 World Cup qualifier	Luxembourg	0–2	Estonia	Stade Josy Barthel, Luxembourg
20:15 UTC+2		Report	Oper 7', 78' (pen.)	Attendance: 2,010; Referee: Selçuk Dereli (Turkey)

12 November Friendly	Finland	2–2	Estonia	Finnair Stadium, Helsinki
14:30 UTC+2	Sjölund 7'; Arkivuo 59'	Report	Kruglov 62' (pen.); Lindpere 85'	Attendance: 1,904; Referee: Grzegorz Gilewski (Poland)

16 November Friendly	Poland	3–1	Estonia	Ostrowiec Świętokrzyski, Poznań
20:30 UTC+1	Lewandowski 8'; Mila 57'; Piechna 87'	Report	Teever 68'	Attendance: 8,500; Referee: Jouni Hyytiä (Finland)

=== 2006 ===
1 March Friendly	Northern Ireland	1–0	Estonia	Windsor Park, Belfast
20:00 UTC	Sproule 2'	Report		Attendance: 13,600; Referee: Pieter Vink (Netherlands)

28 May Friendly	Turkey	1–1	Estonia	Millerntor-Stadion, Hamburg
19:00 UTC+2	Ünal 53'	Report	Neemelo 87'	Attendance: 6,000; Referee: Michael Weiner (Germany)

31 May Friendly	Estonia	1–1	New Zealand	A. Le Coq Arena, Tallinn
17:00 UTC+3	Klavan 3'	Report	Hay 27'	Attendance: 3,500; Referee: Peter Rasmussen (Denmark)

16 August Euro 2008 qualifier	Estonia	0–1	Macedonia	A. Le Coq Arena, Tallinn
19:00 UTC+3		Report	Sedloski 73'	Attendance: 7,000; Referee: Kris Jakobsson (Iceland)

2 September Euro 2008 qualifier	Estonia	0–1	Israel	A Le Coq Arena, Tallinn
21:30 UTC+3		Report	Colautti 7'	Attendance: 7,800; Referee: Johan Verbist (Belgium)

11 October Euro 2008 qualifier	Russia	2–0	Estonia	Petrovsky Stadium, Saint Petersburg
19:00 UTC+4	Pogrebnyak 78'; Sychev 90'	Report		Attendance: 21,500; Referee: Eric Braamhaar (Netherlands)

15 November Friendly	Estonia	2–1	Belarus	A. Le Coq Arena, Tallinn
18:00 UTC+2	Oper 17', 66'	Report	Hleb 63' (pen.)	Attendance: 3,000; Referee: Anders Hermansen (Denmark)

=== 2007 ===
3 February Friendly	Poland	4–0	Estonia	Estadio Municipal de Chapin, Jerez
	Dudka 25'; Kokoszka 32'; Iwanski 70'; Golanski 76'	Report		Attendance: 50; Referee: Daniel Bancalero Ruiz-Herrera (Spain)

7 February Friendly	Slovenia	1–0	Estonia	Sports Park, Domžale
20:15 UTC+1	Lavrič 34' (pen.)	Report		Attendance: 2,900; Referee: Damien Ledentu (France)

24 March Euro 2008 qualifier	Estonia	0–2	Russia	A. Le Coq Arena, Tallinn
20:30 UTC+2		Report	Bystrov 66'; Kerzhakov 78'	Attendance: 9,000; Referee: Darko Ceferin (Slovenia)

28 March Euro 2008 qualifier	Israel	4–0	Estonia	Ramat Gan Stadium, Ramat Gan
20:00 UTC+3	Tal 20'; Colautti 31'; Sahar 77', 80'	Report		Attendance: 23,658; Referee: Cüneyt Cakir (Turkey)

15 May Friendly; Unofficial	Estonia	3–0	Estonia (U21)	A Le Coq Arena, Tallinn
	Terehhov 13'; Leetma 17'; Viikmäe 55'	[ Report]

2 June Euro 2008 qualifier	Estonia	0–1	Croatia	A Le Coq Arena, Tallinn
21:30 UTC+3		Report	Eduardo 32'	Attendance: 10,000; Referee: Viktor Kassai (Hungary)

6 June Euro 2008 qualifier	Estonia	0–3	England	A Le Coq Arena, Tallinn
21:30 UTC+3		Report	J. Cole 37'; Crouch 54'; Owen 62'	Attendance: 11,000; Referee: Grzegorz Gilewski (Poland)

22 August Euro 2008 qualifier	Estonia	2–1	Andorra	A Le Coq Arena, Tallinn
19:00 UTC+3	Piiroja 34'; Zelinski 90+2'	Report	Silva 82'	Attendance: 7,500; Referee: Adrian McCourt (Northern Ireland)

8 September Euro 2008 qualifier	Croatia	2–0	Estonia	Maksimir Stadium, Zagreb
20:30 UTC+2	Eduardo 39', 45+1'	Report		Attendance: 15,102; Referee: Jérôme Laperriere (Switzerland)

12 September Euro 2008 qualifier	Macedonia	1–1	Estonia	Skopje City Stadium, Skopje
20:30 UTC+2	Maznov 30'	Report	Piiroja 17'	Attendance: 5,000; Referee: Leontios Trattou (Cyprus)

13 October Euro 2008 qualifier	England	3–0	Estonia	Wembley Stadium, London
15:00 UTC+1	Wright-Phillips 13'; Rooney 32'; Rähn 34' (o.g.)	Report		Attendance: 86,665; Referee: Nicolai Vollquartz (Denmark)

17 October Friendly	Estonia	0–1	Montenegro	A. Le Coq Arena, Tallinn
18:00 UTC+3		Report	Vučinić 41'	Attendance: 1,500; Referee: Peter Fröjdfeldt (Sweden)

9 November Friendly	Saudi Arabia	2–0	Estonia	Prince Abdullah Al Faisal Stadium, Jeddah
	Al-Jassim 27'; Al-Qahtani 38'	Report		Attendance: 2,500; Referee: Daffer Al Shehri (Saudi Arabia)

17 November Euro 2008 qualifier	Andorra	0–2	Estonia	Estadi Comunal, Andorra la Vella
18:00 UTC+1		Report	Oper 31'; Lindpere 60'	Attendance: 700; Referee: William Collum (Scotland)

21 November Friendly	Uzbekistan	0–0	Estonia	MHSK Stadium, Tashkent
15:00 UTC+5		Report		Attendance: 3,000; Referee: Ravsan Irmatov (Uzbekistan)

=== 2008 ===
27 February Friendly	Poland	2–0	Estonia	Wronki Stadion, Wronki
20:00 UTC+1	Matusiak 38'; Zahorski 72'	Report		Attendance: 4,500; Referee: Stanislav Todorov (Bulgaria)

26 March Friendly	Estonia	2–0	Canada	Lilleküla Stadium, Tallinn
18:00 UTC+2	Stalteri 59' (o.g.); Zahovaiko 90'	Report		Attendance: 1,600; Referee: Audrius Zuta (Lithuania)

27 May Friendly	Estonia	1–1	Georgia	Lilleküla Stadium, Tallinn
18:00 UTC+3	Kink 64' (pen.)	Report	Kenia 83'	Attendance: 2,500; Referee: Thomas Vejlgaard (Denmark)

30 May Baltic Cup	Latvia	1–0	Estonia	Skonto stadions, Riga
19:00 UTC+3	Laizāns 48' (pen.)	Report		Attendance: 4,500; Referee: Zuta (Lithuania)

31 May Baltic Cup	Estonia	0–1	Lithuania	Slokas Stadium, Jūrmala
16:00 UTC+3		Report	Mizigurskis 89'	Attendance: 1,300; Referee: Roman Lajuks (Latvia)

4 June Friendly	Estonia	4–3	Faroe Islands	Lilleküla Stadium, Tallinn
19:00 UTC+3	Zahovaiko 9', 14'; Kink 28'; Novikov 75'	Report	Holst 63', 66'; Olsen 70' (pen.)	Attendance: 3,500; Referee: Daniel Stålhammar (Sweden)

20 August Friendly	Estonia	2–1	Malta	Lilleküla Stadium, Tallinn
19:00 UTC+3	Purje 22'; Oper 53'	Report	Azzopardi 8'	Attendance: 2,700; Referee: Grzegorz Gilewski (Poland)

6 September 2010 World Cup qualifier	Belgium	3–2	Estonia	Stade Maurice Dufrasne, Liège
20:45 UTC+2	Sonck 39', 81'; Defour 75'	Report	Zenjov 57'; Oper 90+2'	Attendance: 17,992; Referee: Mike Dean (England)

10 September 2010 World Cup qualifier	Bosnia and Herzegovina	7–0	Estonia	Bilino Polje, Zenica
20:15 UTC+2	Misimović 25', 30' (pen.), 56'; Muslimović 58'; Džeko 60', 73'; Ibričić 88'	Report		Attendance: 12,500; Referee: Cristian Balaj (Romania)

11 October 2010 World Cup qualifier	Estonia	0–3	Spain	Lilleküla Stadium, Tallinn
21:45 UTC+3		Report	Juanito 34'; Villa 38' (pen.); Puyol 69'	Attendance: 9,200; Referee: Jonas Eriksson (Sweden)

15 October 2010 World Cup qualifier	Estonia	0–0	Turkey	Lilleküla Stadium, Tallinn
21:30 UTC+3		Report		Attendance: 6,500; Referee: Robert Małek (Poland)

12 November Friendly	Estonia	1–1	Latvia	Lilleküla Stadium, Tallinn
20:00 UTC+3	Kink 52'	Report	Grebis 75'	Attendance: 2,000; Referee: Brage Sandmoen (Norway)

18 November Friendly	Estonia	1–0	Moldova	Lilleküla Stadium, Tallinn
18:00 UTC+2	Voskoboinikov 56'	Report		Attendance: 1,500; Referee: Claus Bo Larsen (DEN)

22 November Friendly	Estonia	1–1	Lithuania	Kuressaare linnastaadion, Kuressaare
13:00 UTC+2	Puri 6'	Report	Kavaliauskas 35'	Attendance: 800; Referee: Tero Nieminen (Finland)

23 December 2008 Friendly; Unofficial	Murcia (Region of Murcia)	1–1	Estonia	Estadio Nueva Condomina, Lorca
	Toché 45'	[ Report]	Kink 23'	Attendance: 5,000; Referee: Franco Martínez (Spain)

=== 2009 ===
11 February Friendly	Kazakhstan	2–0	Estonia	Top Kapi Stadium, Belek
19:00 UTC+2	Baltiyev 29', 85'	Report		Attendance: 200; Referee: Hüseyin Göçek (Turkey)

28 March 2010 World Cup qualifier	Armenia	2–2	Estonia	Hanrapetakan Stadium, Yerevan
17:00 UTC+3	Mkhitaryan 33'; Ghazaryan 87'	Report	Vassiljev 36'; Zenjov 67'	Attendance: 3,000; Referee: Luc Wilmes (Luxembourg)

1 April 2010 World Cup qualifier	Estonia	1–0	Armenia	A. Le Coq Arena, Tallinn
18:00 UTC+3	Puri 83'	Report		Attendance: 6,200; Referee: Cyril Zimmermann (Switzerland)

29 May Friendly	Wales	1–0	Estonia	Parc y Scarlets, Llanelli
17:00 UTC+3	Earnshaw 26'	Report		Attendance: 4,071; Referee: Magnús Þórisson (Iceland)

6 June Friendly	Estonia	3–0	Equatorial Guinea	A. Le Coq Arena, Tallinn
19:00 UTC+3	Viikmäe 8'; Voskoboinikov 35'; Zenjov 90'	Report		Attendance: 2,150; Referee: Paulius Malžinskas (Lithuania)

10 June Friendly	Estonia	0–0	Portugal	A. Le Coq Arena, Tallinn
17:00 UTC+3		Report		Attendance: 6,350; Referee: Michael Svendsen (Denmark)

12 August Friendly	Estonia	0–1	Brazil	A. Le Coq Arena, Tallinn
20:15 UTC+3		Report 1 Report 2	Fabiano 44'	Attendance: 8,550; Referee: Martin Ingvarsson (Sweden)

5 September 2010 World Cup qualifier	Turkey	4–2	Estonia	Kadir Has Stadium, Kayseri
21:00 UTC+3	Şanlı 29', 72'; Yıldırım 37'; Turan 62'	Report	Voskoboinikov 7'; Vassiljev 53'	Attendance: 28,569; Referee: Tommy Skjerven (Turkey)

9 September 2010 World Cup qualifier	Spain	3–0	Estonia	Estadio Romano, Mérida
22:00 UTC+2	Fàbregas 33'; Cazorla 81'; Mata 90+2'	Report		Attendance: 14,362; Referee: Oleh Oriekhov (Ukraine)

10 October 2010 World Cup qualifier	Estonia	0–2	Bosnia and Herzegovina	A Le Coq Arena, Tallinn
19:00 UTC+3		Report	Džeko 30'; Ibišević 64'	Attendance: 6,450; Referee: Nicola Rizzoli (Italy)

14 October 2010 World Cup qualifier	Estonia	2–0	Belgium	A Le Coq Arena, Tallinn
21:30 UTC+3	Piiroja 30'; Vassiljev 67'	Report		Attendance: 4,680; Referee: Nicolai Vollquartz (Denmark)

14 November Friendly	Estonia	0–0	Albania	A. Le Coq Arena, Tallinn
17:00 UTC+3		Report		Attendance: 2,110; Referee: Audrius Kancleris (Lithuania)

30 December Friendly	Estonia	1–0	Angola	Estadio Algarve, Faro
21:00 UTC+0	Saag 79'	Report		Attendance: 200; Referee: Nuno Almeida (Portugal)

== See also ==
- Estonia national football team results (1920–1940)
- Estonia national football team results (2010–2019)
- Estonia national football team results (2020–present)
- Estonia national football team all-time record
- List of Estonia international footballers
