= 1991 Baltic Cup =

International football competition

Tournament details
- Host country: Lithuania
- Dates: 15 November – 17 November
- Teams: 3
- Venues: 2 (in 2 host cities)

Final positions
- Champions: Lithuania (3rd title)
- Runners-up: Latvia
- Third place: Estonia

Tournament statistics
- Matches played: 3
- Goals scored: 9 (3 per match)
- Top scorer(s): Nine players (1 goal each)

The 1991 Baltic Cup football competition took place from 15 to 17 November 1991 at the Žalgiris Stadium in Klaipėda, Lithuania and Kretinga Stadium in Kretinga. It was the first competition of the three Baltic states – Latvia, Lithuania and Estonia – since they regained their independence from the Soviet Union, earlier that year. FIFA did not recognize the games as full internationals.

== Results ==
=== Lithuania vs Estonia ===
15 November 1991

Lithuania	4–1	Estonia
Vitkovskis 17'; Ramelis 34'; Urbonas 54' (pen.); Magdišauskas 69'		Kirs 14'

Žalgiris Stadium, Klaipėda
Attendance: 200
Referee: Roman Lajuks (Latvia)

Lithuania
GK	Marius Poškus		(substituted off) 75'
DF	Darius Magdišauskas
DF	Gyrius Kalvaitis
DF	Saulius Atmanavičius
DF	Ramūnas Stonkus		(substituted off) 18'
MF	Arnoldas Aleksandravičius		(substituted off) 46'
MF	Valdas Urbonas
MF	Tomas Ramelis
FW	Aurelijus Skarbalius
FW	Igoris Kirilovas		(substituted off) 75'
FW	Stanislovas Vitkovskis		(substituted off) 58'
Substitutions:
GK	Kęstutis Kumza		(substituted on) 75'
DF	Dainius Suliauskas	Booked	(substituted on) 18'
MF	Remigijus Pocius		(substituted on) 46'
FW	Darius Maciulevičius		(substituted on) 75'
FW	Edgaras Jankauskas		(substituted on) 58'
Manager:
(Lithuania) Benjaminas Zelkevičius

Estonia
GK	Mart Poom
DF	Jaanus Veensalu
DF	Marek Lemsalu
DF	Igor Prins	Booked
DF	Priit Reiska
DF	Toomas Kallaste
MF	Indro Olumets
MF	Aleksei Semyonov	(substituted off) 46'
MF	Meelis Lindmaa
FW	Marko Kristal	Booked	(substituted off) 70'
FW	Urmas Kirs
Substitutions:
DF	Urmas Liivamaa	(substituted on) 46'	(substituted off) 59'
MF	Enn Läänmäe	(substituted on) 59'
FW	Lembit Rajala	(substituted on) 70'
Manager:
(Estonia) Uno Piir

=== Latvia vs Estonia ===
16 November 1991

Latvia	2–0	Estonia
Sproģis 42'; Troickis 79'

Žalgiris Stadium, Klaipėda
Attendance: 200
Referee: Gintaras Dilda (Lithuania)

Latvia
GK	Z Grigurs
DF	Einars Gnedojs
DF	Visvaldis Danga
DF	Aleksejs Sarando
DF	Aleksandrs Stradins
DF	Dzintars Sproģis	Booked	(substituted off) 44'
MF	Vitalijs Teplovs		(substituted off) 44'
MF	Igors Stepanovs
MF	Ilmārs Verpakovskis
FW	Vladimirs Babičevs		(substituted off) 46'
FW	Rolands Bulders		(substituted off) 77'
Substitutions:
FW	Igors Troickis		(substituted on) 44'
MF	Ainars Linards		(substituted on) 44'
MF	Jevgēņijs Gorjačilovs		(substituted on) 46'
FW	V Zventovs		(substituted on) 77'
Manager:
(Latvia) Jānis Gilis

Estonia
GK	Mart Poom
DF	Jaanus Veensalu
DF	Marek Lemsalu
DF	Igor Prins
DF	Priit Reiska
DF	Toomas Kallaste
MF	Indro Olumets	(substituted off) 46'
MF	Aleksei Semyonov
MF	Meelis Lindmaa
FW	Marko Kristal
FW	Urmas Kirs	(substituted off) 64'
Substitutions:
FW	Lembit Rajala	(substituted on) 46'
MF	Enn Läänmäe	(substituted on) 64'
Manager:
(Estonia) Uno Piir

=== Lithuania vs Latvia ===
17 November 1991

Lithuania	1–1	Latvia
Skarbalius 20'		Teplovs 14'

Kretinga Stadium, Kretinga
Attendance: 500
Referee: Kęstutis Birieta (Lithuania)

Lithuania
GK	Marius Poškus
DF	Dainius Suliauskas
DF	Gyrius Kalvaitis
DF	Andrėjus Tereškinas
DF	Tomas Graziunas
MF	Vytas Karvelis	(substituted off) 56'
MF	Valdas Urbonas
MF	Tomas Ramelis	(substituted off) 56'
MF	Aurelijus Skarbalius
FW	Igoris Kirilovas	(substituted off) 81'
FW	Vaidotas Slekys
Substitutions:
DF	Ramūnas Stonkus	(substituted on) 56'
MF	Irmantas Stumbrys	(substituted on) 56'
MF	Saulius Atmanavičius	(substituted on) 81'
Manager:
(Lithuania) Benjaminas Zelkevičius

Latvia
GK	Ēriks Grigjans
DF	Einārs Gņedojs
DF	Dzintars Sproģis	Substituted off
DF	Visvaldis Danga
DF	Igors Stepanovs
DF	Aleksandrs Stradiņš
MF	Vitālijs Teplovs	Substituted off
MF	Aleksejs Šarando
MF	Ilmārs Verpakovskis
FW	Vladimirs Babičevs
FW	Rolands Bulders
Substitutions:
FW	Igors Troickis	Substituted on
MF	Vjačeslavs Zevnerovičs	Substituted on
Manager:
(Latvia) Jānis Gilis

== Final table ==
Team	Pld	W	D	L	GF	GA	GD	Pts
Lithuania	2	1	1	0	5	2	+3	3
Latvia	2	1	1	0	3	1	+2	3
Estonia	2	0	0	2	1	6	−5	0

== Winners ==
1991 Baltic Football Cup winners

Lithuania
Third title

== Statistics ==
=== Goalscorers ===
There were 9 goals scored in 3 matches, for an average of 3 goals per match.

1 goal

- (Estonia) Urmas Kirs
- (Latvia) Dzintars Sproģis
- (Latvia) Igors Troickis
- (Latvia) Vitalijs Teplovs
- (Lithuania) Aurelijus Skarbalius
- (Lithuania) Stanislovas Vitkovskis
- (Lithuania) Tomas Ramelis
- (Lithuania) Darius Magdišauskas
- (Lithuania) Valdas Urbonas
