= 1992 Baltic Cup =

International football competition

Tournament details
- Host country: Latvia
- Dates: 10 July – 12 July
- Teams: 3
- Venue(s): 1 (in 1 host city)

Final positions
- Champions: Lithuania (4th title)
- Runners-up: Latvia
- Third place: Estonia

Tournament statistics
- Matches played: 3
- Goals scored: 10 (3.33 per match)
- Top scorer(s): (Lithuania) Virginijus Baltušnikas (3 goals)

The 1992 Baltic Cup football competition was 12th season of the Baltic Cup and took place from 10–12 July 1992 at the Daugava Stadium in Liepāja, Latvia. It was the second annual competition of the three Baltic states – Latvia, Lithuania and Estonia – since they regained their independence from the Soviet Union in 1991. This time, FIFA did recognize the games as full internationals.

== Results ==
=== Latvia vs Estonia ===
10 July 1992

Latvia	2–1	Estonia
Linards 34', 38'		Olumets 61'

Daugava Stadium, Liepāja
Attendance: 1,200
Referee: Rezepovas (Lithuania)

GK	Eriks Grigjans
DF	Einārs Gņedojs
DF	Oļegs Aleksejenko (c)	(substituted off) 55'
DF	Valērijs Ivanovs
DF	Aleksandrs Stradins
MF	Jurijs Popkovs
MF	Dzintars Sproģis
MF	Sergejs Jemljanovs
MF	Genādijs Šitiks
FW	Ainars Linards
FW	Aleksandrs Jelisejevs	(substituted off) 67'
Substitutions:
DF	Oļegs Blagonadeždins	(substituted in) 55'
FW	Gints Gilis	(substituted in) 67'
Manager:
(Latvia) Janis Gilis

GK	Mart Poom
DF	Meelis Lindmaa
DF	Igor Prins
DF	Toomas Kallaste (c)
DF	Sergei Hohlov-Simson
MF	Sergei Ratnikov
MF	Indro Olumets
MF	Tarmo Linnumäe
MF	Viktor Alonen
FW	Marko Kristal
FW	Urmas Kirs
Manager:
(Estonia) Uno Piir

=== Lithuania vs Estonia ===
11 July 1992

Lithuania	1–1	Estonia
Slekys 27'		Olumets 64'

Daugava Stadium, Liepāja
Attendance: 500
Referee: Lajuks (Latvia)

GK	Marius Poškus
DF	Edgaras Tumasonis
DF	Arūnas Mika
DF	Raimundas Vainoras (c)
DF	Virginijus Baltušnikas
DF	Eimantas Poderis	(substituted off) 46'
MF	Vidmantas Vysniauskas	(substituted off) 80'
MF	Vytautas Apanavičius
MF	Aidas Preiksaitis
FW	Irmantas Stumbrys
FW	Vaidotas Slekys
Substitutions:
FW	Kestutis Ruzgys	(substituted in) 46'
MF	Ričardas Zdančius	(substituted in) 80'
Manager:
(Lithuania) Šenderis Giršovičius

GK	Mart Poom
DF	Sergei Hohlov-Simson
DF	Toomas Kallaste (c)
DF	Igor Prins
DF	Meelis Lindmaa
MF	Viktor Alonen
MF	Indro Olumets
MF	Sergei Ratnikov	(substituted off) 46'
MF	Tarmo Linnumäe	(substituted off) 58'
FW	Marko Kristal
FW	Urmas Kirs
Substitutions:
FW	Jaanus Veensalu	(substituted in) 46'
MF	Marek Lemsalu	(substituted in) 58'
Manager:
(Estonia) Uno Piir

=== Latvia vs Lithuania ===
12 July 1992

Latvia	2–3	Lithuania
Teplovs 27'; Popkovs 89'		Baltušnikas 28', 31', 79'

Daugava Stadium, Liepāja
Attendance: 2,000
Referee: A. Nõmmiste (Estonia)

GK	Aleksandrs Kulakovs
DF	Einārs Gņedojs	Booked
DF	Oļegs Aleksejenko (c)
DF	Valērijs Ivanovs
DF	Vjačeslavs Ževnerovičs		(substituted off) 46'
MF	Jurijs Popkovs
MF	Dzintars Sproģis
MF	Sergejs Jemljanovs		(substituted off) 46'
MF	Vitalijs Teplovs
FW	Ainars Linards
FW	Aleksandrs Stradins
Substitutions:
DF	Aleksejs Semjonovs		(substituted in) 46'
FW	Genādijs Šitiks		(substituted in) 40'
Manager:
(Latvia) Janis Gilis

GK	Marius Poškus
DF	Edgaras Tumasonis
DF	Arūnas Mika		(substituted off) 46'
DF	Raimundas Vainoras (c)
DF	Virginijus Baltušnikas
DF	Andrėjus Tereškinas
MF	Ričardas Zdančius
MF	Andrius Upstas
MF	Viktoras Olsanskis	Booked
FW	Remigijus Pocius		(substituted off) 65'
FW	Vaidotas Slekys
Substitutions:
DF	Vidmantas Vysniauskas		(substituted in) 46'
MF	Kestutis Ruzgys		(substituted in) 65'
Manager:
(Lithuania) Senderis Girsovičius

== Final table ==
Team	Pld	W	D	L	GF	GA	GD	Pts
Lithuania	2	1	1	0	4	3	+1	3
Latvia	2	1	0	1	4	4	0	2
Estonia	2	0	1	1	2	3	−1	1

== Winners ==
1992 Baltic Football Cup winners

Lithuania
Fourth title

== Goalscorers ==
3 goal

- (Lithuania) Virginijus Baltušnikas

2 goal

- (Latvia) Ainars Linards
- (Estonia) Indro Olumets

1 goal

- (Latvia) Vitalijs Teplovs
- (Latvia) Jurijs Popkovs
- (Lithuania) Vaidotas Slekys
