= 2008 Baltic Cup =

International football competition

Tournament details
- Host country: Latvia
- Dates: 30 May – 1 June
- Teams: 3
- Venue: 2 (in 2 host cities)

Final positions
- Champions: Latvia (9th title)
- Runners-up: Lithuania
- Third place: Estonia

Tournament statistics
- Matches played: 3
- Goals scored: 5 (1.67 per match)
- Attendance: 9,130 (3,043 per match)
- Top scorer(s): Four players (1 goal each)

The Baltic Cup 2008 football competition took place from 30 May to 1 June 2008 at the Slokas Stadium in Jūrmala and at the Skonto Stadium in Riga, Latvia.

Hosts Latvia together with Lithuania and Estonia are the teams that took part.

== Results ==
Team	Pld	W	D	L	GF	GA	GD	Pts
Latvia	2	2	0	0	3	1	+2	6
Lithuania	2	1	0	1	2	2	0	3
Estonia	2	0	0	2	0	2	–2	0

30 May 2008
19:00 EEST (UTC+03)

Latvia	1 – 0	Estonia
Laizāns 48' (pen.)	Report

Skonto stadions, Riga
Attendance: 4,500
Referee: Audrius Zuta (Lithuania)
31 May 2008
16:00 EEST (UTC+03)

Estonia	0 – 1	Lithuania
	Report	89' Mižigurskis

Slokas Stadium, Jūrmala
Attendance: 1,300
Referee: Romāns Lajuks (Latvia)
1 June 2008
14:00 EEST (UTC+03)

Latvia	2 – 1	Lithuania
Gorkšs 56'; Alunderis 77' (o.g.)	Report	81' Beniušis

Skonto stadions, Riga
Attendance: 3,330
Referee: Sten Kaldma (Estonia)

== Winners ==
2008 Baltic Football Cup winners

Latvia
Ninth title

== Statistics ==
=== Goalscorers ===
There were 5 goals scored in 3 matches, for an average of 1.67 goals per match.

1 goal

- (Latvia) Juris Laizāns
- (Latvia) Kaspars Gorkšs
- (Lithuania) Valerijus Mižigurskis
- (Lithuania) Ričardas Beniušis

1 own goal

- (Lithuania) Vidas Alunderis (against Latvia)

== Under-21 results ==
Team	widt	W	D	L	GF	GA	GD	Pts
Latvia	2	2	0	0	3	1	+2	6
Lithuania	2	1	0	1	4	1	+3	3
Estonia	2	0	0	2	1	6	–5	0

29 May 2008
18:00 EEST (UTC+03)

Latvia	2 – 1	Estonia
Laizāns 52'; Lukjanovs 86'	Report	21' Kallaste

Slokas Stadium, Jūrmala
Attendance: 700
Referee: Saulius Atmanavičius (Lithuania)
30 May 2008
15:00 EEST (UTC+03)

Estonia	0 – 4	Lithuania
	Report	7' Palionis; 62' (pen.) Valskis; 87' Slavickas; 90+1' Vėževičius

Latvijas Universitates Stadions, Riga
Referee: Andrejs Sipailo (Latvia)
31 May 2008
13:00 EEST (UTC+03)

Latvia	1 – 0	Lithuania
Kožans 74'	Report

Latvijas Universitates Stadions, Riga
Attendance: 200
Referee: Hannes Kaasik (Estonia)

== Statistics ==
=== Goalscorers ===
There were 8 goals scored in 3 matches, for an average of 2.67 goals per match.

1 goal

- (Latvia) U-21 Sergejs Kožans
- (Latvia) U-21 Oļegs Laizāns
- (Latvia) U-21 Ivans Lukjanovs
- (Lithuania) U-21 Markus Palionis
- (Lithuania) U-21 Nerijus Valskis
- (Lithuania) U-21 Vaidas Slavickas
- (Lithuania) U-21 Robertas Vėževičius
- (Estonia) U-21 Ken Kallaste
