= Stonkus =

- Lithuanian surname
- m.: Stonkus
- f.: (unmarried): Stonkutė
- f.: (married): Stonkienė, Stonkuvienė

Stonkus is a Lithuanian language family name. It may refer to:

- Gabrielė Stonkutė (born 2001), Lithuanian female boxer
- Mantas Stonkus (born 1987), Lithuanian actor and comedian
- Ramūnas Stonkus (born 1970), Lithuanian footballer
- Stanislovas Stonkus (1931–2012), Soviet and Lithuanian basketball player
- Stasys Stonkus, Lithuanian basketball player
