= Igor Kirillov (disambiguation) =

The name Igor Kirilov may refer to:

- Igor Leonidovich Kirillov, Soviet-Russian TV presenter
- Igor Anatolyevich Kirillov, Russian general
- Igoris Kirilovas, Lithuanian footballer
