= Darius Maciulevičius =

Lithuanian footballer

Personal information
- Date of birth: 6 November 1973 (age 52)
- Place of birth: Lithuanian SSR, Soviet Union
- Height: 1.75 m (5 ft 9 in)
- Position: Midfielder

Team information
- Current team: Ekranas (manager)
- Number: 30

Senior career*
| Years | Team | Apps | (Gls) |
| 1991–1995 | FK Žalgiris Vilnius | | |
| 1995–1997 | FK Inkaras Kaunas | 42 | (20) |
| 1997 | FC Alania Vladikavkaz | 8 | (2) |
| 1998–2000 | FK Kareda Kaunas | 18 | (9) |
| 2000–2002 | Hakoah Ramat Gan | | |
| 2002–2003 | FC Vilnius | 16 | (2) |
| 2003 | FBK Kaunas | 7 | (6) |
| 2004 | FC Lisma-Mordovia Saransk | 12 | (0) |
| 2004–2008 | FK Sūduva Marijampolė | 125 | (37) |
| 2009 | Atlantis FC | 18 | (2) |

International career
| 1991–2005 | Lithuania | 38 | (8) |

Managerial career
- 2020–: Ekranas
- * Club domestic league appearances and goals

Darius Maciulevičius (born 6 November 1973) is a Lithuanian football coach and a former player. He is the former manager and current Technical Director of Ekranas

== Career ==
He has also represented clubs such as Alania Vladikavkaz, Hakoah Ramat Gan and FK Sūduva Marijampolė.

== International career ==
Maciulevičius played 37 caps, scoring 8 goals, for the Lithuanian National Team.

=== International goals and appearances ===
| # | Date | Venue | Opponent | Result | Minutes | Goal | Competition |
|---|---|---|---|---|---|---|---|
| 1 | 15 November 1991 | Vilnius | Estonia | 4 – 1 | (substituted on) 75' | | Baltic Cup |
| 2 | 8 September 1993 | Dublin | Ireland | 2 – 0 | (substituted on) 68' | | WCQ |
| 3 | 17 May 1995 | Vilnius | Greece | 2 – 1 | (substituted off) 63' | 30' | Friendly |
| 4 | 8 September 1993 | Vilnius | Slovenia | 2 – 1 | (substituted off) 74' | | ECQ |
| 5 | 29 July 1995 | Vilnius | Belarus | 1 – 1 | (substituted off) 77' | | Friendly |
| 6 | 16 August 1995 | Tallinn | Estonia | 0 – 1 | 90' | 48' | ECQ |
| 7 | 6 September 1995 | Vilnius | Ukraine | 1 – 3 | 90' | 15' | ECQ |
| 8 | 10 October 1995 | Vilnius | Estonia | 5 – 0 | 90' | 8' | ECQ |
| 9 | 15 November 1995 | Reggio Emilia | Italy | 4 – 0 | (substituted off) 72' | | ECQ |
| 10 | 21 February 1996 | Haifa | Israel | 4 – 2 | 90' | 32' | Friendly |
| 11 | 31 July 1996 | Minsk | Belarus | 2 – 2 | 90' | | Friendly |
| 12 | 13 August 1996 | Kyiv | Ukraine | 5 – 2 | 90' | | Friendly |
| 13 | 31 August 1996 | Bucharest | Romania | 3 – 0 | (substituted off) 46' | | WCQ |
| 14 | 5 October 1996 | Vilnius | Iceland | 2 – 0 | (substituted off) 46' | | WCQ |
| 15 | 9 October 1996 | Vilnius | Liechtenstein | 2 – 1 | (substituted off) 56' | | WCQ |
| 16 | 16 October 1996 | Teresina | Brazil | 3 – 1 | (substituted off) 78' | | Friendly |
| 17 | 3 November 1996 | Vilnius | Indonesia | 4 – 0 | (substituted off) 63' | 26' | Friendly |
| 18 | 2 April 1997 | Vilnius | Romania | 0 – 1 | 90' | | WCQ |
| 19 | 30 April 1997 | Eschen | Liechtenstein | 3 – 2 | (substituted off) 46' | | WCQ |
| 20 | 31 March 1999 | Vilnius | Estonia | 1 – 2 | 90' | | ECQ |
| 21 | 5 June 1999 | Sarajevo | Bosnia | 2 – 0 | (substituted off) 46' | | ECQ |
| 22 | 9 June 1999 | Tallinn | Estonia | 1 – 2 | (substituted on) 46' | 56' | ECQ |
| 23 | 9 October 1999 | Glasgow | Scotland | 3 – 0 | (substituted on) 54' | | ECQ |
| 24 | 26 April 2000 | Vilnius | Latvia | 2 – 2 | (substituted off) 88' | 86' | Friendly |
| 25 | 3 June 2000 | Vilnius | Armenia | 1 – 2 | 90' | | Friendly |
| 26 | 3 September 2000 | Bucharest | Romania | 1 – 0 | (substituted off) 46' | | WCQ |
| 27 | 7 October 2000 | Kaunas | Georgia | 0 – 4 | (substituted on) 39' | | WCQ |
| 28 | 4 July 2001 | Riga | Estonia | 5 – 2 | (substituted off) 68' | | Baltic Cup |
| 29 | 5 July 2001 | Riga | Latvia | 4 – 1 | 90' | | Baltic Cup |
| 30 | 29 March 2003 | Nürnberg | Germany | 1 – 1 | (substituted on) 46' | | ECQ |
| 31 | 2 April 2003 | Kaunas | Scotland | 1 – 0 | (substituted on) 70' | | ECQ |
| 32 | 30 April 2003 | Kaunas | Romania | 0 – 1 | (substituted off) 66' | | Friendly |
| 33 | 11 June 2003 | Kaunas | Iceland | 0 – 3 | (substituted on) 71' | | ECQ |
| 34 | 3 July 2003 | Valga | Estonia | 1 – 5 | (substituted off) 55' | | Baltic Cup |
| 35 | 4 July 2003 | Valga | Latvia | 2 – 1 | (substituted off) 46' | | Baltic Cup |
| 36 | 11 October 2003 | Glasgow | Scotland | 1 – 0 | (substituted on) 80' | | ECQ |
| 37 | 21 May 2005 | Kaunas | Latvia | 2 – 0 | (substituted off) 46' | | Baltic Cup |

== Honours ==
National Team

- Baltic Cup
  - 2005
