= Igoris Kirilovas =

Lithuanian footballer (1971–2026)

Personal information
- Date of birth: 19 August 1971
- Place of birth: Vilnius, Lithuanian SSR, USSR
- Date of death: 1 June 2026 (aged 54)
- Height: 1.75 m (5 ft 9 in)
- Positions: Defender; midfielder

Senior career*
Years	Team	Apps	(Gls)
1990	FK Vytis Kaunas		(2)
1991–1993	FK Panerys Vilnius	57	(20)
1994	1. FC Magdeburg	14	(0)
1994	FK Panerys Vilnius	11	(4)
1995	FK Kareda Šiauliai	20	(1)
1996	FBK Kaunas	19	(1)
1997	KAMAZ-Chally Naberezhnye Chelny	5	(0)
1998	FBK Kaunas	10	(2)
1998–1999	Kauno Žalgiris	21	(4)
1999–2000	Hapoel Jerusalem	29	(1)
2000	FS Vágar	8	(0)
2001	FK Vėtra	14	(1)
2001–2002	Tobol	31	(2)
2003	FC Zhetysu	16	(2)
2004	Bekentas Vilnius		

International career
1991–1998	Lithuania	27	(1)
- * Club domestic league appearances and goals

Igoris Kirilovas (Russian: Игорь Евгеньевич Кирилов, Igor Yevgenyevich Kirilov; 19 August 1971 – 1 June 2026) was a Lithuanian professional footballer who played as a defender and midfielder. He was of Russian ethnic origin. He died on 1 June 2026, at the age of 54.

== Honours ==
Lithuania

- Baltic Cup: 1991, 1998
