= Edgaras Tumasonis =

Lithuanian footballer (born 1968)

Personal information
- Full name: Edgaras Tumasonis
- Date of birth: 8 May 1968 (age 58)
- Place of birth: Alytus, Lithuanian SSR, Soviet Union
- Height: 1.76 m (5 ft 9 1/2 in)
- Position: Defender

International career^{‡}
Years	Team	Apps	(Gls)
1992–1993	Lithuania	6	(0)
- ‡ National team caps and goals as of 29 May 2009

Edgaras Tumasonis (born 8 May 1968 in Alytus) is a retired Lithuanian football defender, who last played for FK Sirijus Klaipėda during his professional career. He obtained a total number of six caps for the Lithuania national football team, scoring no goals.

== Honours ==
National Team

- Baltic Cup
  - 1992
