= Raimondas Vainoras =

Lithuanian footballer

Personal information
- Full name: Raimondas Vainoras
- Date of birth: 16 July 1965 (age 61)
- Place of birth: Lithuanian SSR, USSR
- Position: Defender

Senior career*
Years	Team	Apps	(Gls)
1988	FK Žalgiris	?	(?)
1989	FK Atlantas	4	(0)
1990–1992	FK Sirijus Klaipėda	?	(?)
1993	FBK Kaunas	0	(0)
1993	FC Flora	10	(1)
1994–1996	Inkaras Kaunas	38	(0)
1997–1998	Sokol-Saratov	46	(0)
1998–1999	FBK Kaunas	9	(0)
2000	FK Atlantas	15	(0)
2002	FK Auda/Alberts	7	(1)

International career^{‡}
1992–1999	Lithuania	44	(0)
- * Club domestic league appearances and goals as of 13 July 2008 ‡ National team caps and goals as of 13 July 2008

Raimondas Vainoras (born 16 July 1965) is a Lithuanian football defender, who last played for Auda Riga in Latvia during his professional career. He obtained 44 caps for the Lithuania national football team, scoring no goals. Vainoras also played as a professional in Estonia and Russia.

== Honours ==
National Team

- Baltic Cup
  - 1992
