= Arūnas Mika =

Lithuanian footballer

Personal information
- Full name: Arūnas Mika
- Date of birth: 11 November 1970 (age 55)
- Place of birth: Lithuanian SSR, Soviet Union
- Height: 1.80 m (5 ft 11 in)
- Position: Defender

International career^{‡}
Years	Team	Apps	(Gls)
1992–1997	Lithuania	13	(1)
- ‡ National team caps and goals as of 24 May 2009

Arūnas Mika (born 11 November 1970) is a retired Lithuanian football defender, who last played for Sakalas Siauliai. He obtained a total number of 13 caps for the Lithuania national football team, scoring one goal.

== Honours ==
National Team

- Baltic Cup
  - 1992
