= Viktor Alonen =

Estonian footballer

Personal information
- Full name: Viktor Alonen
- Date of birth: 21 March 1969 (age 57)
- Place of birth: Viljandi, then part of Estonian SSR, Soviet Union
- Height: 1.71 m (5 ft 7 in)
- Position: Defensive midfielder

Team information
- Current team: Türi Ganvix JK
- Number: 2

Senior career*
Years	Team	Apps	(Gls)
1992–2001	Flora Tallinn	153	(12)
1995	Tervis Pärnu	7	(1)
2001–2003	Tulevik Viljandi	74	(6)
2004	Trans Narva	12	(2)
2005–2007	FC Kuressaare	88	(7)
2007–	Türi Ganvix JK		

International career^{‡}
1992–2001	Estonia	71	(0)
- * Club domestic league appearances and goals as of 18 December 2007 ‡ National team caps and goals as of 4 November 2007

Viktor Alonen (born 21 March 1969) is an Estonian professional footballer, who currently plays for Türi Ganvix JK. He spent the prime years of his career playing for Flora Tallinn.

== International career ==
He won a total of 71 international caps for the Estonia national football team during the 90s. Alonen earned his first official cap as a substitute on 1992-06-03, when Estonia played Slovenia in a friendly match. He played his last game for the national team in the 2002 World Cup qualifier against Portugal in 2001.
