= Marius Poškus =

Lithuanian footballer

Personal information
- Full name: Marius Poškus
- Date of birth: 7 July 1970 (age 56)
- Place of birth: Lithuanian SSR, Soviet Union
- Height: 1.87 m (6 ft 1 1/2 in)
- Position: Goalkeeper

International career^{‡}
Years	Team	Apps	(Gls)
1991–2000	Lithuania	16	(0)
- ‡ National team caps and goals as of 23 May 2009

Marius Poškus (born 7 July 1970) is a retired Lithuanian international football goalkeeper. He obtained a total number of sixteen caps for the Lithuania national football team. During his professional career he played for several clubs in his native country, including FK Sirijus Klaipėda and FK Inkaras Kaunas.

== Honours ==
- Baltic Cup
  - 1991
  - 1992
