= Valdas Urbonas =

Lithuanian footballer and manager

Personal information
- Date of birth: 29 November 1967 (age 58)
- Place of birth: Panevėžys, Lithuanian SSR, Soviet Union
- Height: 1.86 m (6 ft 1 in)
- Position: Defender

Senior career*
Years	Team	Apps	(Gls)
- Mokslas Vilnius
1990	Neris Vilnius		
1991	Vienybė Ukmergė		
1991–1992	Vilnius Makabi	22	(4)
1992	Minija Kretinga		
1992–1993	Geležinis Vilkas	26	(7)
1993–1997	Žalgiris	41	(2)
1996	→ Inkaras (loan)	1	(0)
1996–1997	→ Žalgiris-Volmeta	9	(0)
1997–1998	Videoton	51	(5)
1999	Gázszer	14	(1)
2000	Ekranas	18	(2)

International career
1991–1993	Lithuania	14	(1)

Managerial career
- 2009–2013: Ekranas
- 2014–2016: Trakai
- 2017–2018: Spartaks Jūrmala
- 2018–2019: Žalgiris
- 2019–2021: Lithuania
- 2022: Panevėžys
- * Club domestic league appearances and goals

Valdas Urbonas (born 29 November 1967) is a Lithuanian professional football manager and former player who currently is the manager of the Lithuania national team.

== Club career ==
Urbonas began his career at Mokslas Vilnius, before moving to Neris Vilnius in 1990. In 1991, Urbonas briefly played for Vienybė Ukmergė, before moving to Vilnius Makabi. In 1992, after a spell with Minija Kretinga, Urbonas joined Geležinis Vilkas. In 1993, Urbonas signed for Žalgiris, making 41 A Lyga appearances over the course of four years, scoring twice. In 1997, Urbonas joined Hungarian club Videoton. Urbonas made 51 NB I appearances in three seasons for the club, scoring five times. In 1999, Urbonas joined fellow Hungarian club Gázszer, before returning home in 2000, playing with hometown club Ekranas, before retiring.

== International career ==
Urbonas made 14 appearances for Lithuania, including captaining and scoring for Lithuania on his debut in a 4–1 win against Estonia on 15 November 1991.

== Managerial career ==
In 2009, following roles as assistant manager of FK Vėtra and FBK Kaunas, Urbonas was appointed manager of Ekranas. At Ekranas, Urbonas guided the team to four successive A Lyga titles and two Lithuanian Football Cups. In 2014, Urbonas was appointed manager of Trakai. In 2017, Urbonas was named manager of Latvian club Spartaks Jūrmala. In the same year, Urbonas won the 2017 Latvian Higher League with the club. In 2018, Urbonas returned to Žalgiris, where he had formerly played. In February 2019, Urbonas was appointed manager of Lithuania. In 30 June was announced, that he quit with the job with national team.

== Playing statistics ==
Scores and results list Lithuania's goal tally first.

#	Date	Venue	Opponent	Score	Result	Competition
1	15 November 1991	Klaipėdos centrinis stadionas, Klaipėda, Lithuania	Estonia	3–1	4–1	1991 Baltic Cup

== Managerial statistics ==
As of match played 2 September 2021

Team	From	To	Record				
Team	From	To	G	W	D	L	Win %
Lithuania	12 March 2019	present	25	5	4	16	20.00
