= Tarmo Linnumäe =

Estonian footballer (born 1971)

Personal information
- Full name: Tarmo Linnumäe
- Date of birth: 11 November 1971 (age 54)
- Place of birth: Tartu, then part of Estonian SSR, Soviet Union
- Height: 1.80 m (5 ft 11 in)
- Position: Midfielder

Senior career*
| Years | Team | Apps | (Gls) |
| 1991 | SK Gällivare | | |
| 1992–1995 | FC Flora Tallinn | | |
| 1996 | Lelle SK | | |
| 1997–1998 | Sadam Tallinn | | |
| 1999–2001 | MC Tallinn | | |
| 2002–2003 | JK Tammeka Tartu | | |
| 2004 | Tallinna Kuradid | | |
| 2005 | MC Tallinn | | |
| 2006–2007 | PP-70 | | |

International career
| 1992–1996 | Estonia | 29 | (0) |
- * Club domestic league appearances and goals

Tarmo Linnumäe (born 11 November 1971) is an Estonian retired footballer who played as a midfielder.

== Career ==
He obtained a total number of 29 caps for the Estonia national football team, scoring no goals. He earned his first official cap on 3 June 1992, when Estonia played Slovenia in a friendly match. Linnumäe also played as a professional in Sweden and Finland.
