= Remigijus Pocius =

Lithuanian footballer

Personal information
- Full name: Remigijus Pocius
- Date of birth: 21 March 1968 (age 58)
- Place of birth: Lithuanian SSR, Soviet Union
- Height: 1.83 m (6 ft 0 in)
- Position: Forward

International career^{‡}
| Years | Team | Apps | (Gls) |
| 1992–1997 | Lithuania | 7 | (1) |
- ‡ National team caps and goals as of 2009-05-24

Remigijus Pocius (born 21 March 1968) is a retired Lithuanian football forward, who last played for KFK Siauliai. He obtained a total number of seven caps for the Lithuania national football team, scoring one goal.

== Honours ==
National Team

- Baltic Cup
  - 1991
  - 1992
