= Kristen Viikmäe =

Estonian footballer (born 1979)

Personal information
- Date of birth: 10 February 1979 (age 47)
- Place of birth: Tallinn, then part of Estonian SSR, Soviet Union
- Height: 1.82 m (6 ft 0 in)
- Position: Striker

Senior career*
Years	Team	Apps	(Gls)
1996–2000	FC Flora Tallinn	74	(26)
2000–2003	Vålerenga IF	37	(5)
2003	→ FC Flora Tallinn (loan)	15	(11)
2004–2008	FC Flora Tallinn	51	(18)
2004	→ Enköpings SK (loan)	9	(4)
2005	→ Fredrikstad FK (loan)	6	(1)
2006	→ Gefle IF (loan)	26	(2)
2008–2009	Jönköpings Södra	57	(13)
2010	Panegialios	9	(1)
2011–2012	JK Nõmme Kalju	63	(24)
2013–2014	FC Haiba	0	(0)
2014–2021	Nõmme Kalju II	39	(8)
Total		386	(113)

International career
1997–2013	Estonia	115	(15)
2013–	Estonia (beach soccer)		
- * Club domestic league appearances and goals

Kristen Viikmäe (born 10 February 1979) is an Estonian former professional footballer who played as a striker. He now plays beach soccer.

== Club career ==
Born in Tallinn, Viikmäe started his career with FC Flora Tallinn, and has since played for Tallinna Jalgpallikool, Tallinna Sadam, Vålerenga, Enköpings SK, Fredrikstad, Gefle IF and Jönköpings Södra IF. January 2010 he moved to Panegialios F.C., a third division team in Greece. He left the club in September because of salary problems. In January 2011 he joined JK Nõmme Kalju. On 9 October 2012, he scored the winning goal in a 1–0 victory against FC Kuressaare, which secured JK Nõmme Kalju's first ever title. After the match, Viikmäe announced his intention to retire at the end of the season. He scored in his last match on 5 November 2012.

== International career ==
During his Estonia national team career Viikmäe was capped 115 times and scored 15 goals. He made his debut on 26 January 1997 in a friendly against Lebanon, replacing Andres Oper in the second half. On 30 May 2006, at the age of 27 years and 109 days, Viikmäe became the youngest European footballer to reach 100 caps, which was beaten by German striker Lukas Podolski (27 years and 13 days) during Euro 2012. His testimonial match for the national team, as with all Estonians who are capped more than 100 times during their career, was held on 3 June 2013 against Belarus.

== Post-retirement career ==
Viikmäe became the head of youth department at JK Nõmme Kalju after his retirement.

== Career statistics ==
Scores and results list Estonia's goal tally first, score column indicates score after each Viikmäe goal.

List of international goals scored by Kristen Viikmäe
No.	Date	Venue	Opponent	Score	Result	Competition
1	4 June 1998	Kadriorg Stadium, Tallinn, Estonia	Faroe Islands		5–0	UEFA Euro 2000 qualifying
2	6 March 1999	Antonis Papadopoulos Stadium, Larnaca, Cyprus	Azerbaijan		2–2	Friendly
3	3 November 1999	Mohammed Bin Zayed Stadium, Abu Dhabi, United Arab Emirates	Turkmenistan		1–1	Friendly
4	19 March 2001	Cairo International Stadium, Cairo, Egypt	Egypt		3–3	Friendly
5	9 May 2001	Kuressaare linnastaadion, Kuressaare, Estonia	Finland		1–1	Friendly
6	10 November 2001	Nikos Goumas Stadium, Nea Filadelfeia, Greece	Greece		2–4	Friendly
7	12 October 2002	A. Le Coq Arena, Tallinn, Estonia	New Zealand		3–2	Friendly
8	20 November 2002	A. Le Coq Arena, Tallinn, Estonia	Iceland		2–0	Friendly
9	7 June 2003	A. Le Coq Arena, Tallinn, Estonia	Andorra		2–0	UEFA Euro 2004 qualifying
10	28 April 2004	A. Le Coq Arena, Tallinn, Estonia	Albania		1–1	Friendly
11	30 May 2004	A. Le Coq Arena, Tallinn, Estonia	Denmark		2–2	Friendly
12	18 August 2004	Rheinpark Stadion, Vaduz, Liechtenstein	Liechtenstein		2–1	FIFA 2006 World Cup qualification
13	4 September 2004	A. Le Coq Arena, Tallinn, Estonia	Luxembourg		4–0	FIFA 2006 World Cup qualification
14	17 August 2005	A. Le Coq Arena, Tallinn, Estonia	Bosnia and Herzegovina		1–0	Friendly
15	6 June 2009	A. Le Coq Arena, Tallinn, Estonia	Equatorial Guinea		3–0	Friendly

== Honours ==
Individual

- Estonian Silverball: 2004

== See also ==
- List of men's footballers with 100 or more international caps
