= Daugava Stadium (Liepāja) =

Stadium in Latvia

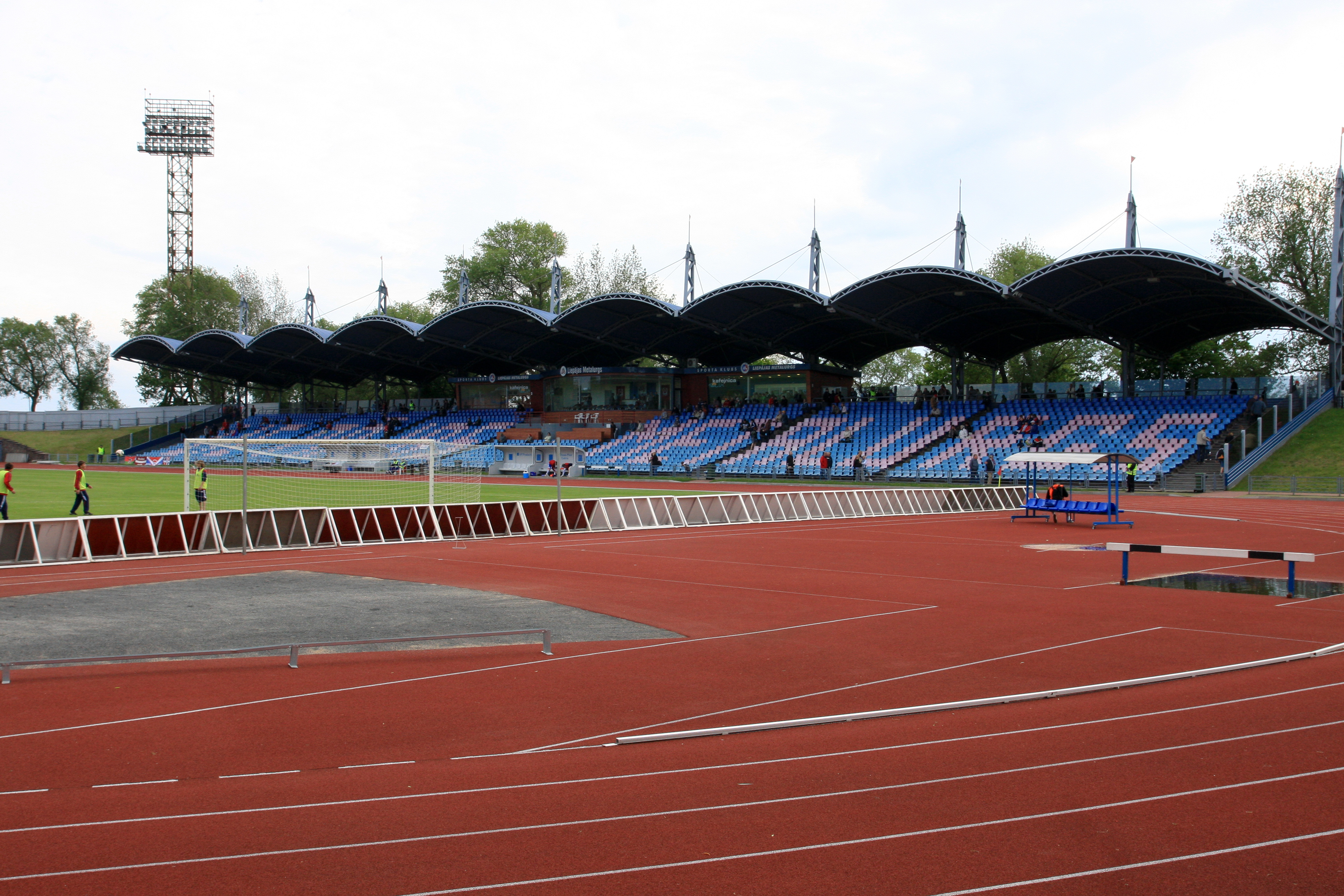
- Interactive map of Daugava Stadium
- Full name: Daugavas stadions
- Former names: Strādnieku stadions (1925–1934) Pilsētas stadions (1934–1990)
- Location: Liepāja, Latvia
- Coordinates: 56.5030°N 20.9952°E
- Capacity: 4,022
- Field size: 105 m × 68 m (115 yd × 74 yd)

Construction
- Opened: 1925

Tenant
- FK Liepāja

Daugava Stadium (Latvian: Daugavas stadions) is a multi-purpose stadium in Liepāja, Latvia. It is currently used mostly for football matches and is the home stadium of FK Liepāja, also was in the past the home stadium of FHK Liepājas Metalurgs. The stadium holds 4,022 people, and hosted the Baltic Cup in 1992, 1998, 2014, 2016 and 2024. The Latvia women's national side have also played at the stadium.

From 1925 to 1934 the stadium was named "Strādnieku stadions" (workers' stadium), from 1934 to 1990 "Pilsētas stadions" (town stadium).
