= Juris Laizāns =

Latvian footballer

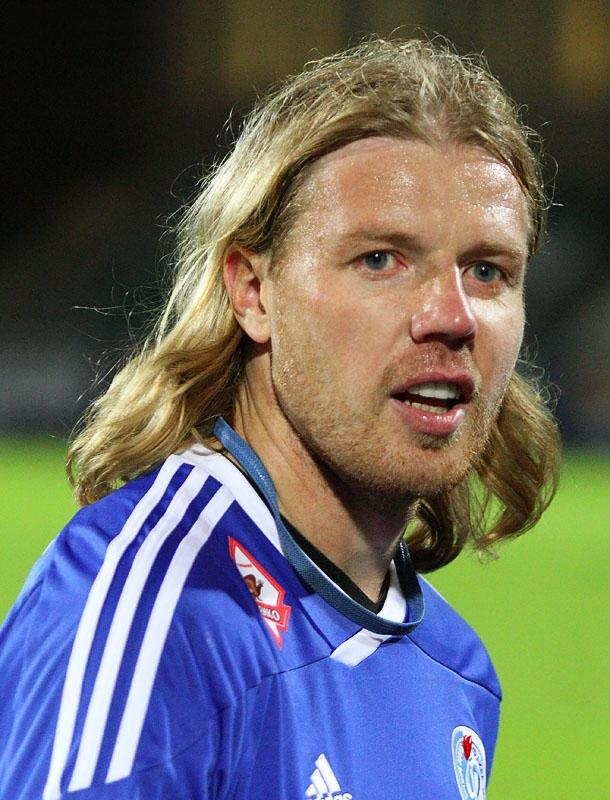
- Laizāns with Fakel in 2011

Personal information
- Date of birth: 6 January 1979 (age 47)
- Place of birth: Riga, Latvian SSR, USSR (now Republic of Latvia)
- Height: 1.86 m (6 ft 1 in)
- Position: Midfielder

Youth career
- Skonto Riga

Senior career*
Years	Team	Apps	(Gls)
1997–2000	Skonto Riga	81	(10)
2001–2005	CSKA Moscow	79	(5)
2005	Torpedo Moscow	9	(1)
2006	Rostov	21	(1)
2007	Kuban Krasnodar	24	(4)
2008	Shinnik Yaroslavl	24	(1)
2009	RFS/Olimps	10	(0)
2009	Ventspils	6	(1)
2010	Skonto Riga	11	(1)
2010	Salyut Belgorod	13	(1)
2011	Skonto Riga	14	(2)
2011–2012	Fakel Voronezh	17	(3)
2012–2014	Skonto Riga	32	(3)
Total		341	(33)

International career
1998–2013	Latvia	113	(15)
- * Club domestic league appearances and goals

Juris Laizāns (born 6 January 1979) is a Latvian former professional footballer. A midfielder, he spent a large part of his playing career abroad in Russia. He made 113 appearances for the Latvia national team scoring 15 goals.

== Club career ==
Born in Riga, Laizāns started his career with Skonto FC and moved to the Russian team CSKA Moscow in 2000. His team managed to win the UEFA Cup. After leaving CSKA Laizāns kept playing in Russia for FC Torpedo Moscow, FC Rostov, FC Kuban Krasnodar and FC Shinnik Yaroslavl. In 2009, he came back to Latvia, signing for Olimps/RFS, later also playing for FK Ventspils and participating in the UEFA Europa League group stages. Laizāns signed for Skonto FC at the start of 2010, but left the team soon - he joined the Russian team FC Salyut Belgorod. At the end of the season he was released, and he returned to Skonto FC. Playing 14 matches and scoring two goals, he again left Riga, this time in July 2011 for Fakel Voronezh, playing in the Russian First League. After a season spent in Russia, Laizāns again joined Skonto on 30 August 2012. Laizāns played for Skonto till April 2014, afterwards ending his professional footballer's career.

== International career ==
Laizāns made 113 appearances and scored 15 goals for the Latvian national team. He made his international debut in a friendly match against Georgia on 6 February 1998.

He participated in UEFA Euro 2004, appearing in all three of Latvia's group-stage matches. Latvia were drawn in the same group as the Czech Republic, the Netherlands, and the Germany. They were eliminated in the group stage after recording one draw and two defeats.

Laizāns' final official international appearance came in a friendly match against the Republic of Ireland on 15 November 2013. Latvia lost the match 3–0. Between 1998 and 2013, he made 113 appearances and scored 15 goals for the national team.

== Post-playing career ==
After the end of his professional footballer's career on 11 April 2014, Laizāns accepted an offer from the Russian Premier League club FC Krasnodar to become a member of their scouting staff.

== Career statistics ==
- 1997 - Skonto Riga (2/0)
- 1998 - Skonto Riga (26/1)
- 1999 - Skonto Riga (27/3)
- 2000 - Skonto Riga (26/6)
- 2001 - CSKA Moscow (26/0)
- 2002 - CSKA Moscow (26/3)
- 2003 - CSKA Moscow (21/1)
- 2004 - CSKA Moscow (4/0)
- 2005 - CSKA Moscow (3/1), FC Torpedo Moscow (9/1)
- 2006 - FC Rostov (21/1)
- 2007 - FC Kuban Krasnodar (24/4)
- 2008 - Shinnik Yaroslavl (24/1)
- 2009 - Olimps/RFS (10/0)
- 2009 - FK Ventspils (6/1)
- 2010 - Skonto Riga (12/1)
- 2010 - FC Salyut Belgorod (13/1)
- 2011 - Skonto Riga (14/2)
- 2011/12 - FC Fakel Voronezh (17/3)
- 2012 - Skonto Riga (6/0)
- 2013 - Skonto Riga (25/3)
- 2014 - Skonto Riga (1/0)

== Honours ==
Club

- Champion of Latvia: 1998, 1999, 2000
- Champion of Russia: 2003, 2005
- Russian Cup: 2002, 2005
- Russian Super Cup: 2004
- UEFA Cup: 2005
- Triobet Baltic League: 2011
- Baltic Cup: 2003, 2008

Individual

- Latvian Footballer of the Year: 2002

== See also ==
- List of men's footballers with 100 or more international caps
