= Viktoras Olšanskis =

Lithuanian footballer (born 1969)

Personal information
- Full name: Viktoras Olšanskis
- Date of birth: 14 March 1969 (age 57)
- Place of birth: Lithuanian SSR, USSR
- Height: 1.79 m (5 ft 10 in)
- Position: Midfielder

Senior career*
Years	Team	Apps	(Gls)
1991–1992	FK Sirijus Klaipėda	38	(9)
1993	FC Flora	18	(2)
1993–1994	1. FSV Schwerin	0	(0)
1993–1994	FC Wil	0	(0)
1995	JK Tervis Pärnu	5	(2)
1996	FC Haka	13	(0)
1996	FK Žalgiris	9	(0)
1997	Baltika Kaliningrad	4	(0)
1998	Anzhi Makhachkala	33	(1)
1999–2001	Skonto FC	34	(1)
2000	→ Policijas FK (loan)	9	(0)
2002–2003	FK Atlantas	28	(1)
2003	FK Šilutė	?	(?)

International career
1992–1994	Lithuania	14	(1)
- * Club domestic league appearances and goals

Viktoras Olšanskis (born 14 March 1969) is a Lithuanian former professional footballer. He was playing the position of midfielder and is 1.79 m tall and weighs 78 kg. He is a former member of the Lithuania national football team.

== Honours ==
- Baltic Cup
  - 1992
