= Igoris Morinas =

Lithuanian footballer

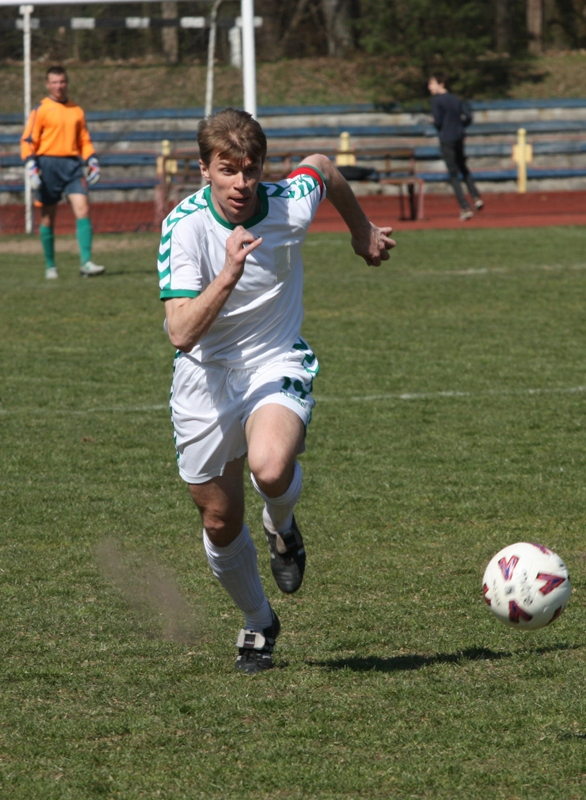

Personal information
- Full name: Igoris Morinas
- Date of birth: 21 February 1975 (age 51)
- Place of birth: Vilnius, Lithuanian SSR, Soviet Union
- Height: 1.79 m (5 ft 10 in)
- Position: Midfielder

Senior career*
Years	Team	Apps	(Gls)
1993–1995	Panerys Vilnius	68	(27)
1996–1998	Žalgiris Vilnius	65	(40)
1998–2002	Hannover 96	77	(14)
2002–2003	Mainz 05	16	(1)
2003	Jahn Regensburg	4	(0)
2003–2009	Žalgiris Vilnius	123	(35)
2009–2010	Kruoja Pakruojis	14	(8)
2010–2011	Žalgiris Vilnius	17	(4)

International career^{‡}
1996–2007	Lithuania	51	(7)
- * Club domestic league appearances and goals as of 1 January 2010 ‡ National team caps and goals as of 4 October 2008

Igoris Morinas (born 21 February 1975) is a Lithuanian former international footballer.

== Career ==
Morinas previously played for Hannover 96, 1. FSV Mainz 05 and Jahn Regensburg in the German 2. Bundesliga.

== Honours ==
- Baltic Cup: 1997, 2005
