= Indro Olumets =

Estonian footballer

Personal information
- Full name: Indro Olumets
- Date of birth: 10 April 1971 (age 55)
- Place of birth: Tartu, then part of Estonian SSR, Soviet Union
- Height: 1.77 m (5 ft 10 in)
- Position: Midfielder

Youth career
- 1987–1989: FC Flora Tallinn

Senior career*
| Years | Team | Apps | (Gls) |
| 1989 | SK Sport | 31 | (2) |
| 1990–1995 | FC Flora Tallinn | 121 | (41) |
| 1996 | Lelle SK | 6 | (2) |
| 1996–1998 | Sadam Tallinn | ? | (?) |
| 1999–2003 | FC Levadia Tallinn | 101 | (25) |
| 2004 | FC TVMK Tallinn | 12 | (1) |
| 2005–2008 | Nõmme Kalju | 82 | (14) |

International career
| 1991–1996 | Estonia | 32 | (2) |
- * Club domestic league appearances and goals

Indro Olumets (born 10 April 1971 in Tartu) is a former Estonian footballer who played as an offensive-minded midfielder. His last years of playing professional football were in the Estonian Meistriliiga side Nõmme Kalju. After that he has played for amateur teams including JK Kaitseliit Kalev.

He has also played for major Estonian clubs such as Flora Tallinn, Tallinna Sadam, Levadia Tallinn and TVMK Tallinn.

== Player qualities ==
Olumets is known for his passing skills, positioning and instinct for finding strikers; due to these, he has a lot of assists to his name. He played a big role in Kalju's 2005 season, when the club won promotion to Esiliiga. Olumets is considered to be one of the most technical Estonian players ever.

== International career ==
Olumets has represented the Estonia national football team 32 times and scored 2 goals, both in the 1992 Baltic Cup. He earned his first official cap at the age of 21 on 3 June 1992, when Estonia played Slovenia in a friendly match.

== Coaching career ==
Having retired from professional football, he coached of one of the many Nõmme Kalju youth teams.

His coaching career started when he was still an active professional player, when he became the coach for a Nõmme Kalju youngsters team and the Kalju reserve team.
