= Saulius Atmanavičius =

Lithuanian footballer

Personal information
- Full name: Saulius Atmanavičius
- Date of birth: 8 February 1970 (age 56)
- Place of birth: Lithuanian SSR, USSR
- Height: 1.83 m (6 ft 0 in)
- Position: Defender

Senior career*
Years	Team	Apps	(Gls)
1988	Granitas Klaipėda		
1989–1994	FK Sirijus Klaipėda		
1995–1997	FBK Kaunas		
1998–2002	FK Liepājas Metalurgs		
2003	Rodovitas Klaipėda		

International career^{‡}
1991–1996	Lithuania	3	(0)
- * Club domestic league appearances and goals as of 13 July 2008 ‡ National team caps and goals as of 13 July 2008

Saulius Atmanavičius (born 8 February 1970) is a retired Lithuanian football defender, who last played for Rodovitas Klaipėda during his professional career. He obtained a total number of three caps for the Lithuania national football team, scoring no goals.

== Honours ==
National Team

- Baltic Cup
  - 1991
