= Meelis Lindmaa =

Estonian footballer

Personal information
- Full name: Meelis Lindmaa
- Date of birth: 14 October 1970 (age 56)
- Place of birth: Estonia
- Height: 1.76 m (5 ft 9 in)
- Positions: Defender; midfielder

International career^{‡}
Years	Team	Apps	(Gls)
1992–1996	Estonia	28	(0)
- ‡ National team caps and goals as of 23 May 2009

Meelis Lindmaa (born 14 October 1970) is a retired football (soccer) defender from Estonia, who also played as a midfielder. He retired in 2004. He played in the former Soviet Union, Estonia, Sweden and Finland.

== International career ==
Lindmaa obtained a total number of 28 caps for the Estonia national football team during his career. He earned his first official cap on 3 June 1992, when Estonia played Slovenia in a friendly match.
