= Aivar Anniste =

Estonian footballer (born 1980)

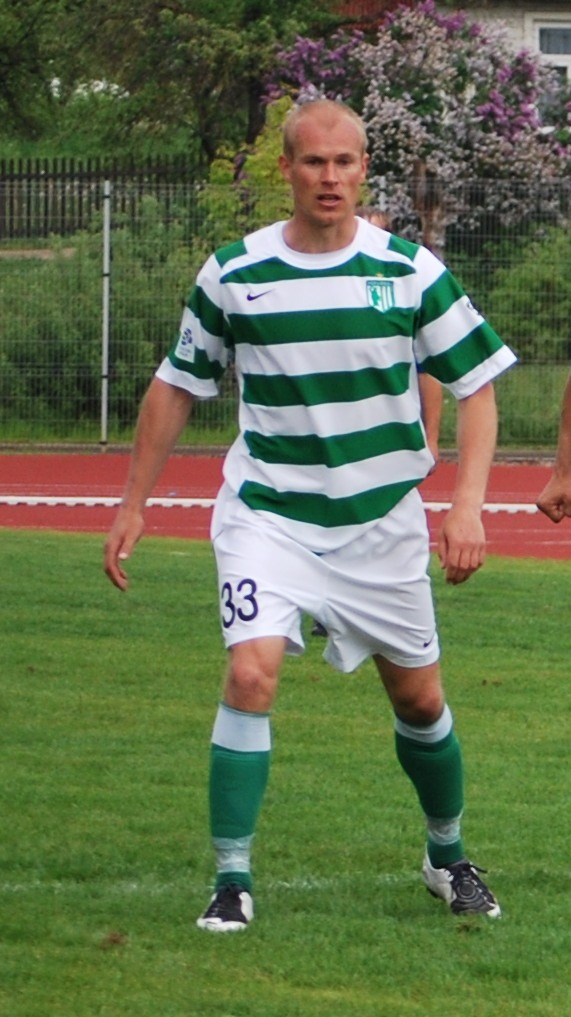

Personal information
- Full name: Aivar Anniste
- Date of birth: 18 February 1980 (age 46)
- Place of birth: Põltsamaa, Estonia
- Position: Central midfielder

Senior career*
Years	Team	Apps	(Gls)
1997–1999	Lelle SK	34	(4)
1999–2002	Flora	66	(10)
2001–2003	Valga	52	(5)
2004	Tulevik	9	(2)
2004	Ullensaker/Kisa IL	16	(1)
2005	Tammeka	36	(5)
2006	Hønefoss	19	(0)
2007	Enköpings SK	16	(0)
2007–2008	TVMK	45	(16)
2009–2010	Flora	26	(1)
2012–2015	FCF Tallinna Ülikool	55	(19)
2016–	Viimsi JK	41	(5)

International career^{‡}
1997–2008	Estonia	45	(3)
- * Club domestic league appearances and goals as of 1 January 2018 ‡ National team caps and goals as of 1 January 2018

Aivar Anniste (born 18 February 1980) is an Estonian footballer, who plays for Viimsi JK. He plays the position of central midfielder.

== Club career ==
He played for FC Flora Tallinn for several seasons, then went to Norway to Hønefoss BK and then he played in Sweden for Enköpings SK for half season, before moving back to Estonia.

== International career ==
He was an Estonia national football team player, having participated in 45 matches and scoring 3 goals with the senior side.

== Career statistics ==
=== International goals ===
#	Date	Venue	Opponent	Score	Result	Competition
1.	15 November 2000	Kuressaare linnastaadion, Kuressaare, Estonia	Kyrgyzstan	1–0	Won	Friendly
2.	4 July 2001	Daugava Stadium, Riga, Latvia	Lithuania	2–5	Lost	2001 Baltic Cup
3.	12 October 2002	A. Le Coq Arena, Tallinn, Estonia	New Zealand	3–2	Won	Friendly
Correct as of 7 October 2015

== Honours ==
Individual

- Meistriliiga Manager of the Season: 2023,
- Meistriliiga Manager of the Month: October 2023
