= Vaidotas Šlekys =

Lithuanian footballer

Personal information
- Full name: Vaidotas Šlekys
- Date of birth: 11 February 1972 (age 54)
- Place of birth: Lithuanian SSR, Soviet Union
- Height: 1.81 m (5 ft 11 in)
- Position: Forward

Senior career*
Years	Team	Apps	(Gls)
1991–1994	Ekranas Panevėžys	73	(47)
1994–1996	Wil	71	(30)
1996–1997	Lugano	25	(1)
1997–1998	Schaffhausen	29	(11)
1998–2000	Wil	54	(19)
2000–2004	Vaduz	86	(16)
2004	Rheindorf Altach	5	(1)
2005	RW Rankweil		
2005–2006	Chur 97	0	(0)
2006	Ekranas Panevėžys	11	(1)

International career^{‡}
1991–1998	Lithuania	32	(3)
- * Club domestic league appearances and goals ‡ National team caps and goals as of 24 May 2009

Vaidotas Šlekys (born 11 February 1972) is a retired Lithuanian football forward, who last played for Ekranas Panevėžys.

== Club career ==
Šlekys also played as a professional in Switzerland and Austria during his career. He never played for the Swiss club FC Chur 97 despite being with them for over a year.

== International career ==
He obtained a total number of 32 caps for the Lithuania national football team, scoring three goals.

== Honours ==
National Team

- Baltic Cup: 1991, 1992
