= Stanislovas Vitkovskis =

Lithuanian footballer

Personal information
- Full name: Stanislovas Vitkovskis
- Date of birth: 1967 (age 58–59)
- Place of birth: Lithuanian SSR, Soviet Union
- Position: Midfielder

International career^{‡}
Years	Team	Apps	(Gls)
1991–1992	Lithuania	2	(1)
- ‡ National team caps and goals as of 2009-05-23

Stanislovas Vitkovskis (born 1967) is a retired Lithuanian international football midfielder. He obtained a total number of two caps for the Lithuania national football team, scoring one goal. During his professional career he played only for his native Lithuania.

== Honours ==
- Baltic Cup
- 1991 Baltic Cup
