= 1997 Baltic Cup =

International football competition

Tournament details
- Host country: Lithuania
- Dates: 9 July – 11 July
- Teams: 3
- Venue(s): 1 (in 1 host city)

Final positions
- Champions: Lithuania (7th title)
- Runners-up: Latvia
- Third place: Estonia

Tournament statistics
- Matches played: 3
- Goals scored: 7 (2.33 per match)
- Attendance: 850 (283 per match)
- Top scorer(s): Seven players (1 goal each)

The 1997 Baltic Cup football competition took place from 9 to 11 July 1997 at the Žalgiris Stadium in Vilnius, Lithuania. It was the seventh annual competition of the three Baltic states – Latvia, Lithuania and Estonia – since they regained their independence from the Soviet Union in 1991.

== Results ==
=== Lithuania vs Estonia ===
9 July 1997

Lithuania	2–1	Estonia
Morinas 35'; Suliauskas 69' (pen.)		Reim 77'

Žalgiris Stadium, Vilnius
Attendance: 300
Referee: Roman Lajuks (Latvia)

=== Estonia vs Latvia ===
10 July 1997

Estonia	1–2	Latvia
Kristal 15'		Babičevs 30'; Pahars 50'

Žalgiris Stadium, Vilnius
Attendance: 150
Referee: Algirdas Dubinskas (Lithuania)

=== Lithuania vs Latvia ===
11 July 1997

Lithuania	1–0	Latvia
Ramelis 66'

Žalgiris Stadium, Vilnius
Attendance: 400
Referee: Oleg Timofejev (Estonia)

== Final table ==
Team	Pld	W	D	L	GF	GA	GD	Pts
Lithuania	2	2	0	0	3	1	+2	6
Latvia	2	1	0	1	2	2	0	3
Estonia	2	0	0	2	2	4	−2	0

== Winners ==
1997 Baltic Football Cup winners

Lithuania
Seventh title

== Statistics ==
=== Goalscorers ===
There were 7 goals scored in 3 matches, for an average of 2.33 goals per match.

1 goal

- (Estonia) Martin Reim
- (Estonia) Marko Kristal
- (Latvia) Marians Pahars
- (Latvia) Vladimirs Babičevs
- (Lithuania) Tomas Ramelis
- (Lithuania) Igoris Morinas
- (Lithuania) Dainius Suliauskas
