= Irmantas Stumbrys =

Lithuanian footballer

Personal information
- Date of birth: 30 May 1972
- Place of birth: Tauragė, Lithuanian SSR, Soviet Union
- Date of death: 15 November 2000 (aged 28)
- Place of death: Panevėžys, Lithuania
- Height: 1.77 m (5 ft 10 in)
- Position: Midfielder

Senior career*
Years	Team	Apps	(Gls)
1991–1994	Ekranas Panevėžys	76	(20)
1995–1997	Kareda-Sakalas Šiauliai	51	(9)
1997	Zenit St. Petersburg	15	(1)
1998	→ Ekranas Panevėžys (loan)	22	(4)
1999	Zenit St. Petersburg II	5	(0)
1999–2000	Torpedo-ZIL	52	(7)
Total		221	(41)

International career
1995–1999	Lithuania	37	(2)
- * Club domestic league appearances and goals

Irmantas Stumbrys (30 May 1972 – 16 November 2000) was a Lithuanian football player who played as a midfielder. He has played for a number of first division Lithuanian teams and for some Russian sides including Zenit.

== Club career ==
He started his career at Ekranas Panevėžys and played for Kareda-Sakalas Šiauliai before moving abroad to join Russian giants Zenit St. Petersburg in 1997. He had just won promotion to the Russian Premier League with Torpedo-ZIL before his death.

== International career ==
Stumbrys made his debut for Lithuania in a November 1991 Baltic Cup match against Latvia and earned a total of 37 caps, scoring 2 goals. His final international was an October 1999 European Championship qualifying match against Scotland.

== Death ==
He died in November 2000 after getting shot in his head in Panevėžys, Lithuania. His body was found in his car. His death was considered suicide after police investigations.

He was survived by his wife and his son.

== Honours ==
- Baltic Cup
  - 1992, 1998
