= Toomas Kallaste =

Estonian footballer

Personal information
- Full name: Toomas Kallaste
- Date of birth: 27 January 1971 (age 55)
- Place of birth: Tallinn, then part of Estonian SSR, Soviet Union
- Height: 1.88 m (6 ft 2 in)
- Position: Defender

Senior career*
| Years | Team | Apps | (Gls) |
| 1998 | Tallinna Lõvid | ? | (?) |
| 1989 | Sport Tallinn | 20 | (0) |
| 1991–1996 | FC Flora Tallinn | 76 | (4) |
| 1997–1998 | FF Jaro | 47 | (4) |
| 1999–2000 | Kotkan TP | 57 | (1) |
| 2001–2002 | Bodens BK | 42 | (3) |
| 2003–2004 | FC TVMK Tallinn | 40 | (1) |
| 2005–2006 | JK Nõmme Kalju | ? | (?) |

International career
| 1992–1996 | Estonia | 42 | (0) |
- * Club domestic league appearances and goals

Toomas Kallaste (born 27 January 1971) is a former Estonian professional footballer.

He was born in Tallinn and played in the position of defender. He is 1.88 m tall and weighs 77 kg. He won a total of 42 international caps for the Estonia national football team. Kallaste earned his first official cap on 1992-06-03, when Estonia played Slovenia in a friendly match.
