= Tomas Ramelis =

Lithuanian footballer

Personal information
- Full name: Tomas Ramelis
- Date of birth: 28 May 1971 (age 55)
- Place of birth: Vilnius, Lithuanian SSR, Soviet Union
- Height: 1.90 m (6 ft 3 in)
- Position: Forward

Senior career*
Years	Team	Apps	(Gls)
1990	Žalgiris	12	(6)
1991–1992	Panerys	38	(17)
1992–1996	1. FSV Schwerin		
1996–1997	Žalgiris	23	(10)
1998	Royal Antwerp	10	(0)
1998	Žalgiris	3	(1)
1999–2001	Stomil Olsztyn	39	(8)

International career
1991–1999	Lithuania	15	(5)
- * Club domestic league appearances and goals

Tomas Ramelis (born 28 May 1971) is a Lithuanian former professional footballer who played as a forward. He obtained a total number of fifteen caps for the Lithuania national team, scoring five goals. During his professional career he played in his native country, Belgium, Germany and Poland.

== Honours ==
Latvia

- Baltic Cup: 1991, 1997
