= 2001 Baltic Cup =

International football competition

Tournament details
- Host country: Latvia
- Dates: 3 July – 5 July
- Teams: 3
- Venue(s): 1 (in 1 host city)

Final positions
- Champions: Latvia (7th title)
- Runners-up: Lithuania
- Third place: Estonia

Tournament statistics
- Matches played: 3
- Goals scored: 16 (5.33 per match)
- Attendance: 6,000 (2,000 per match)
- Top scorer(s): (Latvia) Vladimirs Koļesņičenko (Latvia) Marians Pahars (2 goals)

The 2001 Baltic Cup football competition was the 19th season of the Baltic Cup and took place on from 3–5 July 2001 at the Daugava Stadium in Riga, Latvia, after it had not been staged for three years. It was the ninth competition of the three Baltic states; Latvia, Lithuania and Estonia; since they regained their independence from the Soviet Union in 1991.

== Results ==
=== Latvia vs Estonia ===
3 July 2001
18:30

Latvia	3–1	Estonia
Verpakovskis 41'; Pahars 50'; Koļesņičenko 90'		Zelinski 47'

Daugava Stadium, Riga
Attendance: 3,500
Referee: Miezelis (Lithuania)

=== Lithuania vs Estonia ===
4 July 2001
18:30

Lithuania	5–2	Estonia
Buitkus 37'; Česnauskis 46'; Vasiliauskas 73'; Trakys 90'; Vilėniškis 90+1'		Anniste 7'; Švets 35'

Daugava Stadium, Riga
Attendance: 500
Referee: Lajuks (Latvia)

=== Latvia vs Lithuania ===
5 July 2001
18:30

Latvia	4–1	Lithuania
Rubins 45'; Pahars 52'; Blagonadeždins 84'; Koļesņičenko 89'		Barasa 12'

Daugava Stadium, Riga
Attendance: 4,000
Referee: Kaldma (Estonia)

== Final table ==
Team	Pld	W	D	L	GF	GA	GD	Pts
Latvia	2	2	0	0	7	2	+5	6
Lithuania	2	1	0	1	6	6	0	3
Estonia	2	0	0	2	3	8	−5	0

== Winners ==
2001 Baltic Football Cup winners

Latvia
Seventh title

== Statistics ==
=== Goalscorers ===
There were 16 goals scored in 3 matches, for an average of 5.33 goals per match.

2 goals

- (Latvia) Vladimirs Koļesņičenko
- (Latvia) Marians Pahars

1 goal

- (Estonia) Indrek Zelinski
- (Estonia) Aivar Anniste
- (Estonia) Mark Švets
- (Latvia) Māris Verpakovskis
- (Latvia) Andrejs Rubins
- (Latvia) Oļegs Blagonadeždins
- (Lithuania) Deividas Česnauskis
- (Lithuania) Nerijus Barasa
- (Lithuania) Nerijus Vasiliauskas
- (Lithuania) Orestas Buitkus
- (Lithuania) Raimondas Vilėniškis
- (Lithuania) Valdas Trakys
