= Andrius Upstas =

Lithuanian footballer

Personal information
- Full name: Andrius Upstas
- Date of birth: 16 January 1969 (age 57)
- Place of birth: Lithuanian SSR, Soviet Union
- Position: Midfielder

International career^{‡}
Years	Team	Apps	(Gls)
1992–1996	Lithuania	5	(1)
- ‡ National team caps and goals as of 23 May 2009

Andrius Upstas (born 16 January 1969) is a retired Lithuanian international football midfielder. He obtained a total number of five caps for the Lithuania national football team, scoring one goal. He played for FK Inkaras Kaunas, FBK Kaunas and FK Kareda Kaunas during his professional career.

== Honours ==
- Baltic Cup
  - 1992
