= Ramūnas Stonkus =

Lithuanian footballer (born 1970)

Personal information
- Date of birth: 31 December 1970 (age 55)
- Place of birth: Kaunas, Soviet Union
- Height: 1.77 m (5 ft 10 in)
- Position: Defender

Senior career*
Years	Team	Apps	(Gls)
1988–1996	FK Žalgiris Vilnius		
1996–1997	Zeytinburnuspor	1	(0)
1997–1998	Sportfreunde Siegen	3	(0)
1998–2001	SV Wilhelmshaven		
2001–2003	FC Schönberg 95		
2003–2004	FK Vėtra	44	(4)
2005	FK Žalgiris Vilnius	19	(0)

International career
1991–1996	Lithuania	20	(1)
- * Club domestic league appearances and goals

Ramūnas Stonkus (born 31 December 1970) is a Lithuanian former professional footballer who played as a defender.

== Club career ==
Stonkus was born in Kaunas. He spent most of his career playing for FK Žalgiris Vilnius. He had a brief spell with Zeytinburnuspor in the Süper Lig during the 1996–97 season.

== International career ==
Stonkus appeared in 20 matches for the senior Lithuania national team.

== Honours ==
Lithuania

- Baltic Cup: 1991
