= Dainius Šuliauskas =

Lithuanian footballer

Personal information
- Full name: Dainius Šuliauskas
- Date of birth: 27 August 1973 (age 53)
- Place of birth: Lithuanian SSR, USSR
- Height: 1.76 m (5 ft 9 1/2 in)
- Position: Defender

Senior career*
Years	Team	Apps	(Gls)
1991–1998	Žalgiris Vilnius	132	(16)
1998–1999	GKS Bełchatów	1	(0)
1999	FBK Kaunas	19	(2)
2001	FK Inkaras Kaunas	27	(3)
2002–2003	FK Sūduva	31	(4)
2003	→ FK Sviesa (loan)	3	(1)

International career
1991–1997	Lithuania	9	(1)
- * Club domestic league appearances and goals

Dainius Šuliauskas (born 27 August 1973) is a Lithuanian former professional footballer who played as a defender. He obtained a total number of nine caps for the Lithuania national football team, scoring one goal.

== Honours ==
Lithuania

- Baltic Cup: 1991, 1997

Žalgiris Vilnius

- A Lyga: 1991–92
- Lithuanian Cup: 1992–93, 1993–94, 1996–97

FBK Kaunas

- A Lyga: 1999
