= Darius Magdišauskas =

Lithuanian footballer

Personal information
- Date of birth: 14 July 1969 (age 57)
- Height: 1.93 m (6 ft 4 in)
- Position: Centre-back

Senior career*
| Years | Team | Apps | (Gls) |
| 1987 | Nevėžis | | |
| 1989 | Obuvschik Lida | | |
| 1990–1992 | Sakalas Šiauliai | | |
| 1992–1993 | Obuvschik Lida | 30 | (0) |
| 1993–1996 | ROMAR Mažeikiai | 38+ | (3) |
| 1996–1997 | Flora | 19 | (1) |
| 1997 | Lelle | 4 | (0) |
| 1997 | TP-Seinäjoki | 17 | (0) |
| 1998–1999 | Liepājas Metalurgs | 47 | (1) |
| 2000 | B36 | 4 | (1) |
| 2000 | Vagar | 9 | (1) |
| 2001–2002 | IK Arvika | | |
| 2003 | Klässbols SK | | |
| 2005–2008 | VB Vágur/Sumba | | |

International career
| 1991 | Lithuania | 1 | (1) |
- * Club domestic league appearances and goals

Darius Magdišauskas (born 14 July 1969) is a Lithuanian former footballer who played as a centre-back.

== Career ==
Magdišauskas started his career with Belarusian side Lida. Before the 1990 season, he signed for Kareda in Lithuania. After that, Magdišauskas signed for Estonian club Flora. In 1997, he signed for TP-Seinäjoki in the Finnish top flight, where he made 17 league appearances and scored 0 goals.

Before the 1998 season, Magdišauskas signed for Latvian team Liepājas Metalurgs. Before the 2000 season, he signed for B36 in the Faroe Islands. In 2000, he signed for Vagar. After that, he signed for Swedish outfit IK Arvika. In 2006, he was appointed manager of Šiauliai. In 2010, he was appointed manager of IFK Strömstad.
