= Aleksandrs Stradiņš =

Latvian footballer

Personal information
- Date of birth: 15 October 1968 (age 58)
- Position: Midfielder

Senior career*
Years	Team	Apps	(Gls)
1988–1990	RAF Jelgava		
1991	Skonto FC		
1992	FC Asmaral Kislovodsk		
1992–1993	Skonto FC		
1993	FC Hoverla Uzhhorod		
1994	FK Pārdaugava		
1995	Vilan Daugavpils		
1996–1997	FSK Daugava 90		
1998	FK Ventspils		
1999	FK Žalgiris		
2000–2001	FK Liepājas Metalurgs		

International career
1992–1997	Latvia	19	(0)
- * Club domestic league appearances and goals

Aleksandrs Stradiņš (born 15 October 1968) is a retired Latvian football midfielder.
