= Raimondas Vilėniškis =

Lithuanian footballer (born 1976)

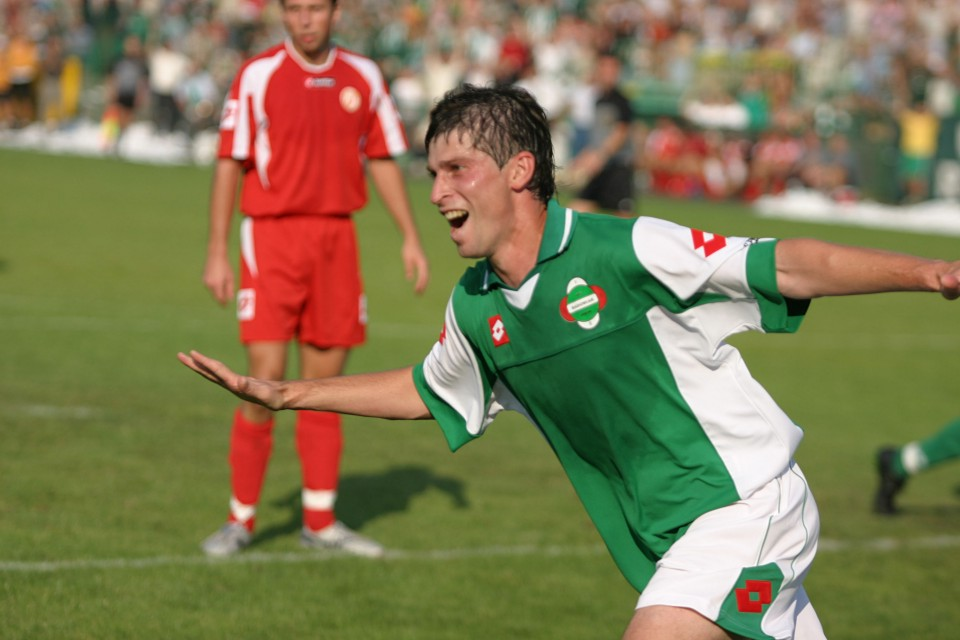

Personal information
- Date of birth: 10 June 1976 (age 50)
- Place of birth: Panevėžys, Lithuania
- Height: 1.80 m (5 ft 11 in)
- Position: Midfielder

Senior career*
Years	Team	Apps	(Gls)
1992–1994	Ekranas	51	(4)
1995	Kareda Šiauliai	16	(2)
1996	Kaunas	2	(1)
1996–2000	Ekranas	104	(15)
2000–2002	Žalgiris	53	(23)
2002–2004	Wisła Płock	28	(1)
2004–2005	Žalgiris	13	(3)
2005–2006	Radomiak Radom	32	(2)
2006–2009	Žalgiris	67	(5)
2009–2010	Kruoja Pakruojis	20	(4)
2010–2013	Žalgiris	70	(6)

International career
2001–2003	Lithuania	3	(1)
- * Club domestic league appearances and goals

Raimondas Vilėniškis (born 10 June 1976) is a Lithuanian former professional footballer who played as a midfielder.

== Honours ==
Ekranas

- Lithuanian Cup: 1997–98

Žalgiris

- Lithuanian Cup: 2011–12
