= Urmas Kirs =

Estonian manager and footballer

Personal information
- Date of birth: 5 November 1966 (age 59)
- Place of birth: Viljandi, then part of Estonian SSR, Soviet Union
- Position: Defender

Senior career*
Years	Team	Apps	(Gls)
1990–1991	Tulevik		
1992–1999	Flora	131	(36)
1999–2000	KTP	26	(3)
2001	Elva		
2001–2002	Tulevik	2	(0)

International career
1992–2000	Estonia	80	(5)

Managerial career
- 2009: Flora II
- 2010–2012: Estonia U18
- 2013–2016: Estonia U21 (assistant)
- 2014: Visadus
- 2015–2016: Viimsi
- 2016–2017: Tarvas
- 2016–2017: Estonia U21
- * Club domestic league appearances and goals

Urmas Kirs (born 5 November 1966) is an Estonian football manager and a retired footballer. He lastly coached the Estonian Meistriliiga club Tarvas. He played in the position of defender. Kirs spent the most of his career in Flora.

== International career ==
Kirs won a total of 80 international caps for the Estonia national team. He earned his first official cap on 3 June 1992, when Estonia played Slovenia in a friendly match.

== Career statistics ==
=== International goals ===
#	Date	Venue	Opponent	Score	Result	Competition
1.	30 October 1996	Arto Tolsa Areena, Kotka, Finland	Finland	2–2	Draw	Friendly
2.	4 June 1997	Viljandi Stadium, Viljandi, Estonia	Azerbaijan	1–0	Win	Friendly
3.	4 June 1998	Kadriorg Stadium, Tallinn, Estonia	Faroe Islands	5–0	Win	UEFA Euro 2000 qualifying
4.	23 September 1998	Kadriorg Stadium, Tallinn, Estonia	Egypt	2–2	Draw	Friendly
5.	28 November 1998	Ganja City Stadium, Ganja, Azerbaijan	Azerbaijan	2–1	Loss	Friendly
Correct as of 7 October 2015
