= Jaanus Veensalu =

Estonian footballer

Personal information
- Full name: Jaanus Veensalu
- Date of birth: 29 July 1964 (age 62)
- Place of birth: Estonia
- Position: Defender

International career^{‡}
Years	Team	Apps	(Gls)
1991–1993	Estonia	6	(0)
- ‡ National team caps and goals as of 23 May 2009

Jaanus Veensalu (born 29 July 1964) is a retired football (soccer) defender from Estonia, who retired in 1997. His last club was JK Tervis Pärnu. Veensalu obtained a total number of six caps for the Estonia national football team during the early 1990s.
