= Vitālijs Teplovs =

Latvian footballer

Personal information
- Date of birth: 20 March 1970 (age 56)
- Place of birth: Riga
- Position: Forward

Senior career*
Years	Team	Apps	(Gls)
1987–1988	Zvejnieks Liepāja		
1988–1990	FSK Daugava 90		
1991	FK Pārdaugava		
1992	FSK Daugava 90		
1992	FC Asmaral Kislovodsk		
1993–1995	KFC Diest		
1994	→ Düsseldorfer SV 04		
1995	RAF Jelgava		
1996	FC Neftekhimik Nizhnekamsk		
1996	Sliema Wanderers F.C.		
1997	Dinaburg FC		
1997–1998	FSK Daugava 90		
2000	FC TVMK		
2001	FSK Daugava 90		
2002–2003	RKB-Arma		

International career
1992–1997	Latvia	9	(1)
- * Club domestic league appearances and goals

Vitālijs Teplovs (born 20 March 1970) is a retired Latvian football striker.
