= Lembit Rajala =

Estonian footballer

Personal information
- Full name: Lembit Rajala
- Date of birth: 1 December 1970 (age 55)
- Place of birth: Tallinn, then part of Estonian SSR, Soviet Union
- Position: Striker

Senior career*
Years	Team	Apps	(Gls)
1986–1989	Tallinna Lõvid	?	(?)
1987–1989	FC Flora Tallinn	10	(4)
1989–1990	FC Norma	?	(?)
1991–1996	FC Flora Tallinn	69	(36)
1997	JK Viljandi Tulevik	0	(0)
1997–2001	IFK Mariehamn	93	(66)
1999	→ KTP (loan)	3	(0)

International career^{‡}
1992–1996	Estonia	26	(2)
- * Club domestic league appearances and goals as of 28 February 2008 ‡ National team caps and goals as of 28 February 2008

Lembit Rajala (born 1 December 1970) is a former Estonian professional footballer. He was playing the position of striker. He won a total of 26 international caps for the Estonia national football team.
