= 1998 Baltic Cup =

International football competition

Tournament details
- Dates: 21 April – 25 June
- Teams: 3
- Venues: 3 (in 3 host cities)

Final positions
- Champions: Lithuania (8th title)
- Runners-up: Latvia
- Third place: Estonia

Tournament statistics
- Matches played: 3
- Goals scored: 5 (1.67 per match)
- Attendance: 3,200 (1,067 per match)
- Top scorer(s): (Latvia) Marians Pahars (Latvia) Vladimirs Babičevs (Latvia) Igors Sļesarčuks (Lithuania) Irmantas Stumbrys (1 goal)

The 1998 Baltic Cup football competition was the 18th season of the Baltic Cup. It did not take place, as before, at one single venue. The annual tournament was split up into three separate matches, starting with Latvia against Lithuania on 21 April 1998.

== Results ==
=== Latvia vs Lithuania ===
21 April 1998

Latvia	1–2	Lithuania
Sļesarčuks 87'		Stepanovs 20' (o.g.); Stumbrys 71'

Daugava Stadium, Liepāja
Attendance: 2,500
Referee: Kaldma (Estonia)

=== Estonia vs Latvia ===
25 June 1998

Estonia	0–2	Latvia
		Pahars 19'; Babičevs 87'

Sportland Arena, Valga
Attendance: 300
Referee: Dubinskas (Lithuania)

=== Estonia vs Lithuania ===
28 June 1998

Estonia	0–0	Lithuania

Viljandi linnastaadion, Viljandi
Attendance: 400
Referee: Lajuks (Latvia)

== Final table ==
Team	Pld	W	D	L	GF	GA	GD	Pts
Lithuania	2	1	1	0	2	1	+1	4
Latvia	2	1	0	1	3	2	+1	3
Estonia	2	0	1	1	0	2	−2	1

== Winners ==
1998 Baltic Football Cup winners

Lithuania
Eight title

== Statistics ==
=== Goalscorers ===
There were 5 goals scored in 3 matches, for an average of 1.67 goals per match.

1 goal

- (Latvia) Marians Pahars
- (Latvia) Vladimirs Babičevs
- (Latvia) Igors Sļesarčuks
- (Lithuania) Irmantas Stumbrys

1 own goal

- (Latvia) Igors Stepanovs (against Lithuania)
