= Valerijus Mižigurskis =

Lithuanian footballer

Personal information
- Date of birth: 22 April 1983 (age 43)
- Height: 1.79 m (5 ft 10 1/2 in)
- Position: Striker

Team information
- Current team: FC Levadia Tallinn
- Number: 15

Senior career*
Years	Team	Apps	(Gls)
2000	Polonija Vilnius	4	(0)
2001	FK Žalgiris Vilnius	17	(4)
2002	FC Spartak Moscow	0	(0)
2002	FK Žalgiris Vilnius	6	(1)
2003	FK Ekranas	12	(3)
2003	Šviesa Vilnius	1	(0)
2004	FC Dynamo Makhachkala	3	(0)
2004	FK Vėtra	5	(1)
2005	FK Ekranas	22	(1)
2006–2007	FK Žalgiris Vilnius	51	(18)
2008	FK Vindava Ventspils	6	(2)
2008	FC Kaisar	13	(1)
2009	FK Tauras Tauragė	10	(1)
2009–2010	FC Ordabasy	8	(2)
2010	FK Banga Gargždai	16	(5)
2011–	FC Levadia Tallinn	12	(4)
2012	Lokomotiv Plovdiv - samples		

International career^{‡}
2008–	Lithuania	1	(1)
- * Club domestic league appearances and goals as of 15 December 2011 ‡ National team caps and goals as of 15 December 2011

Valerijus Mižigurskis (born 22 April 1983) is a Lithuanian professional football player. As of March 2011, he plays for FC Levadia Tallinn.
