= Igors Troickis =

Latvian footballer

Personal information
- Full name: Igors Troickis
- Date of birth: 11 January 1969 (age 57)
- Place of birth: USSR
- Height: 1.72 m (5 ft 7 1/2 in)
- Position: Defender

Youth career
- RFSh Riga

Senior career*
Years	Team	Apps	(Gls)
1988–1992	RAF Jelgava	150	(3)
1992–1996	Skonto FC	96	(9)
1997	FC Baltika Kaliningrad	3	(0)
1997–1998	FC Kristall Smolensk	51	(0)
1999	FC Lokomotiv St. Petersburg	23	(0)
2000–2003	FK Ventspils	100	(1)
2004–2006	FK Rīga	65	(0)

International career
1992–2001	Latvia	41	(0)
- * Club domestic league appearances and goals

Igors Troickis (Russian: Игорь Анатольевич Троицкий, Igor Anatolyevich Troitskiy; born 11 January 1969) is a former football defender from Latvia. He obtained a total number of 41 caps for the Latvia national team between 1992 and 2001. His last club was FK Rīga. Troickis also played as a professional in Russia during his career.

== Honours ==
- Baltic Cup (1):
  - 1993
- Latvian Champion (4):

- 1993, 1994, 1995, 1996
