= Klaipėda Central Stadium =

Lithuanian football stadium

Coordinates: 55.7262°N 21.1096°E

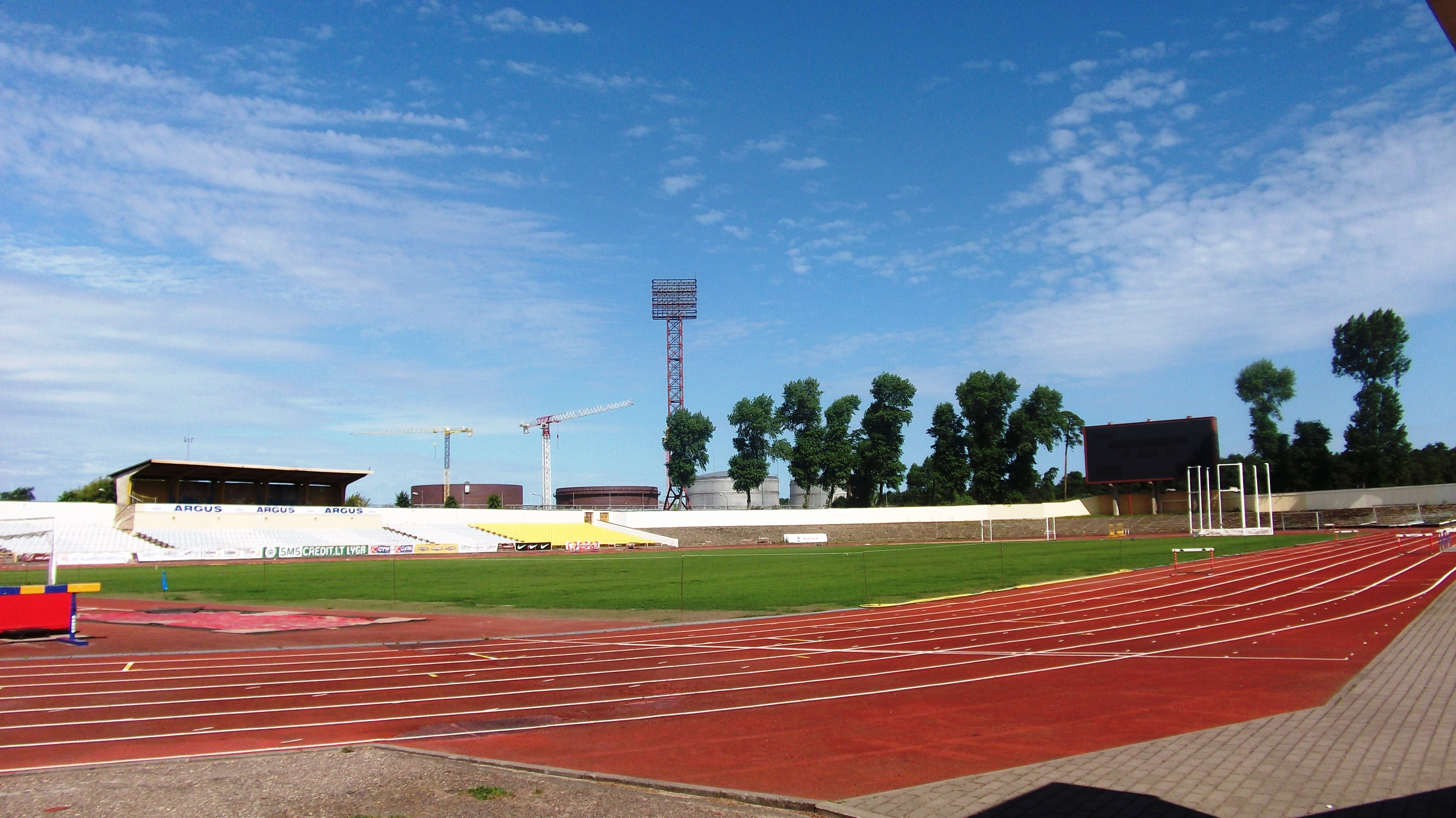
Klaipėda Central Stadium

Klaipėda Central Stadium (Lithuanian: Klaipėdos centrinis stadionas) is a football stadium in Klaipėda, Lithuania. It was the home ground of FK Atlantas, and has a capacity of 4,428. The construction started in 1925 and the stadium was originally opened in 1927.
