= Ainārs Linards =

Latvian footballer

Personal information
- Date of birth: 12 May 1964 (age 62)
- Position: Midfielder

Senior career*
| Years | Team | Apps | (Gls) |
| 1982–1986 | Zvejnieks Liepāja | | |
| 1987 | Daugava Rīga | | |
| 1987–1989 | Zvejnieks Liepāja | | |
| 1989 | Daugava Rīga | | |
| 1990–1992 | Olimpija Liepāja | | |
| 1992 | Örebro SK | | |
| 1993–1994 | Spårvägens FF | | |
| 1995–1997 | DAG / Baltika / Metalurgs Liepāja | | |

International career
| 1992–1997 | Latvia | 21 | (5) |
- * Club domestic league appearances and goals

Ainārs Linards (born 12 May 1964) is a retired Latvian football midfielder, who played for the Latvia national football team.
