= Latvia national football team results (1991–2019) =

- Win Draw Loss

This article provides details of international football games played by the Latvia national football team from its reestablishment in 1991 to 2019.

== Results ==
=== 1991 ===
16 November 1991 1991 Baltic Cup	Latvia	2–0	Estonia	Klaipėda, Lithuania
	Sproģis 42'; Troickis 79'			Stadium: Žalgiris Stadium; Attendance: 200; Referee: Gintaras Dilda (Lithuania)

17 November 1991 1991 Baltic Cup	Lithuania	1–1	Latvia	Klaipėda, Lithuania
	Skarbalius 20'		Teplovs 14'	Stadium: Žalgiris Stadium; Attendance: 500; Referee: Kęstutis Birieta (Latvia)

=== 1992 ===
8 April 1992 Friendly	Romania	2–0	Latvia	Bucharest, Romania
18:00 UTC+3	Badea 4'; Petrescu 52'	Report		Stadium: Stadionul Steaua; Attendance: 6,000; Referee: Marc Batta (France)

26 May 1992 Friendly	Malta	1–0	Latvia	Ta' Qali, Malta
18:00 UTC+2	Saliba 49'	Report		Stadium: Ta' Qali National Stadium; Attendance: 1,214; Referee: Charles Agius (Malta)

10 July 1992 1992 Baltic Cup	Latvia	2–1	Estonia	Liepāja, Latvia
18:30 UTC+3	Linards 34', 38'	Report	Olumets 61'	Stadium: Daugava Stadium; Attendance: 1,500; Referee: Anatolijus Rezepovas (Lithuania)

12 July 1992 1992 Baltic Cup	Latvia	2–3	Lithuania	Liepāja, Latvia
	Teplovs 27'; Popkovs 89'	Report	Baltušnikas 28', 31', 79'	Stadium: Daugava Stadium; Attendance: 4,300; Referee: Ants Nõmmiste (Estonia)

12 August 1992 1994 FIFA World Cup qualification	Latvia	1–2	Lithuania	Riga, Latvia
18:30 UTC+3	Linards 15'	Report	Poderis 66'; Tereškinas 85'	Stadium: Daugava Stadium; Attendance: 6,897; Referee: Jozef Marko (Czechoslovakia)

26 August 1992 1994 FIFA World Cup qualification	Latvia	0–0	Denmark	Riga, Latvia
18:30 UTC+3		Report		Stadium: Daugava Stadium; Attendance: 8,124; Referee: Alfred Wieser (Austria)

9 September 1992 1994 FIFA World Cup qualification	Republic of Ireland	4–0	Latvia	Dublin, Ireland
17:00 UTC+1	Sheedy 30'; Aldridge 59', 82' (pen.), 86'	Report		Stadium: Lansdowne Road; Attendance: 32,000; Referee: Anders Frisk (Sweden)

23 September 1992 1994 FIFA World Cup qualification	Latvia	0–0	Spain	Riga, Latvia
20:00 UTC+3		Report		Stadium: Daugava Stadium; Attendance: 6,220; Referee: Roger Philippi (Luxembourg)

28 October 1992 1994 FIFA World Cup qualification	Lithuania	1–1	Latvia	Vilnius, Lithuania
18:30 UTC+3	Fridrikas 85'	Report	Linards 44'	Stadium: Žalgiris Stadium; Attendance: 4,000; Referee: Andrew Waddell (Scotland)

11 November 1992 1994 FIFA World Cup qualification	Albania	1–1	Latvia	Tirana, Albania
	Kepa 67'	Report	Aleksejenko 3'	Stadium: Qemal Stafa Stadium; Attendance: 3,500; Referee: Gerhard Kapl (Austria)

18 November 1992 Friendly	Poland	1–0	Latvia	Iława, Poland
13:00 UTC+1	Mielcarski 70'	Report		Stadium: Stadion Jezioraka Iława; Attendance: 12,000; Referee: Sergejus Slyva (Lithuania)

16 December 1992 1994 FIFA World Cup qualification	Spain	5–0	Latvia	Seville, Spain
21:30 UTC+1	Bakero 49'; Guardiola 51'; Alfonso 80'; Begiristain 82', 83'	Report		Stadium: Ramón Sánchez Pizjuán Stadium; Attendance: 19,000; Referee: Ion Crăciunescu (Romania)

=== 1993 ===
20 February 1993 Indoor Baltic Cup	Lithuania	2–1	Latvia	Vantaa, Finland
	Mikalajūnas 69'; Šuliauskas 74'	Report	Semjonovs 28'	Stadium: Myyrmäki Indoor Hall; Attendance: 200; Referee: Timo Keltanen (Finland)
Note: Lithuania played with B team due to scheduling conflict.

21 February 1993 Indoor Baltic Cup	Latvia	2–0	Estonia	Vantaa, Finland
	Bulders 28'; Semjonovs 35'	Report		Stadium: Myyrmäki Indoor Hall; Attendance: 100; Referee: Styrbjörn Oskarsson (Finland)

14 April 1993 1994 FIFA World Cup qualification	Denmark	2–0	Latvia	Copenhagen, Denmark
19:00 UTC+2	Vilfort 23'; Strudal 76'	Report		Stadium: Parken; Attendance: 29,000; Referee: Rune Pedersen (Norway)

15 May 1993 1994 FIFA World Cup qualification	Latvia	0–0	Albania	Riga, Latvia
18:30 UTC+3		Report		Stadium: Daugava Stadium; Attendance: 3,100; Referee: Alan Howells (Wales)

2 June 1993 1994 FIFA World Cup qualification	Latvia	1–2	Northern Ireland	Riga, Latvia
18:30 UTC+3	Linards 55'	Report	Magilton 4'; Taggart 15'	Stadium: Daugava Stadium; Attendance: 2,764; Referee: Piotr Werner (Poland)

9 June 1993 1994 FIFA World Cup qualification	Latvia	0–2	Republic of Ireland	Riga, Latvia
18:30 UTC+3		Report	Aldridge 14'; McGrath 42'	Stadium: Daugava Stadium; Attendance: 5,113; Referee: Dick Jol (Netherlands)

2 July 1993 1993 Baltic Cup	Estonia	0–2	Latvia	Pärnu, Estonia
18:00 UTC+3		Report	Astafjevs 52'; Sarando 80'	Stadium: Kalevi Stadium; Attendance: 150; Referee: Jevgeni Tšelnokov (Estonia)

3 July 1993 1993 Baltic Cup	Lithuania	0–0	Latvia	Pärnu, Estonia
18:00 UTC+3		Report		Stadium: Kalevi Stadium; Attendance: 150; Referee: Jevgeni Tšelnokov (Estonia)

8 September 1993 1994 FIFA World Cup qualification	Northern Ireland	2–0	Latvia	Belfast, Northern Ireland
20:00 UTC+1	Quinn 35'; Gray 80'	Report		Stadium: Windsor Park; Attendance: 6,400; Referee: João Pinto Correia (Portugal)

=== 1994 ===
2 June 1994 Friendly	Latvia	2–0	Malta	Riga, Latvia
19:00 UTC+3	Drupass 41'; Astafjevs 47'	Report		Stadium: Daugavas Stadions; Attendance: 2,500; Referee: Oleg Timofejev (Estonia)

26 June 1994 Friendly	Latvia	1–3	Georgia	Riga, Latvia
	Astafjevs 60'	Report	Janashia 13'; Kacharava 74'; Jamarauli 76'	Stadium: ASK Stadion; Attendance: 1,000; Referee: Algirdas Dubinskas (Lithuania)

30 July 1994 1994 Baltic Cup	Estonia	0–2	Latvia	Vilnius, Lithuania
18:30 UTC+3		Report	Astafjevs 31'; Bulders 37'	Stadium: Žalgiris Stadium; Attendance: 250; Referee: Algirdas Dubinskas (Lithuania)

31 July 1994 1994 Baltic Cup	Lithuania	1–0	Latvia	Vilnius, Lithuania
18:30 UTC+3	Tereškinas 67' (pen.)	Report		Stadium: Žalgiris Stadium; Attendance: 1,000; Referee: Oleg Timofejev (Estonia)

7 September 1994 UEFA Euro 1996 qualifying	Latvia	0–3	Republic of Ireland	Riga, Latvia
20:00 UTC+3		Report	Aldridge 16', 75' (pen.); Sheridan 29'	Stadium: Daugava Stadium; Attendance: 3,226; Referee: Anders Frisk (Sweden)

9 October 1994 UEFA Euro 1996 qualifying	Latvia	1–3	Portugal	Riga, Latvia
19:00 UTC+2	Miļevskis 87'	Report	João Vieira Pinto 31', 69'; Figo 70'	Stadium: Daugava Stadium; Attendance: 5,400; Referee: Eric Blareau (Belgium)

6 November 1994 Friendly	Latvia	0–0	Estonia	Ozolnieki, Latvia
13:00 UTC+2		Report		Stadium: Ozolnieki Sports Center; Attendance: 400; Referee: Romāns Lajuks (Latvia)

15 November 1994 UEFA Euro 1996 qualifying	Liechtenstein	0–1	Latvia	Eschen, Liechtenstein
14:00 UTC+1		Report	Babičevs 14'	Stadium: Sportpark; Attendance: 1,300; Referee: Piotr Werner (Poland)

=== 1995 ===
8 March 1995 Friendly	Hungary	3–1	Latvia	Budapest, Hungary
17:00 UTC+1	Hamar 46', 53'; Csertői 65'	Report	Zemļinskis 68' (pen.)	Stadium: Fáy utcai Stadion; Attendance: 3,000; Referee: Radislav Rabrenović (FR Yugoslavia)

29 March 1995 UEFA Euro 1996 qualifying	Austria	5–0	Latvia	Salzburg, Austria
18:25 UTC+2	Herzog 17', 59'; Pfeifenberger 40'; Polster 71' (pen.), 90+1'	Report		Stadium: Stadion Lehen; Attendance: 5,262; Referee: Charles Agius (Malta)

26 April 1995 UEFA Euro 1996 qualifying	Latvia	0–1	Northern Ireland	Riga, Latvia
19:00 UTC+3		Report	Dowie 70' (pen.)	Stadium: Daugava Stadium; Attendance: 1,560; Referee: Finn Lambeck (Denmark)

19 May 1995 1995 Baltic Cup	Latvia	2–0	Estonia	Riga, Latvia
18:00 UTC+3	Zeiberliņš 37'; Ivanovs 67'	Report		Stadium: Daugava Stadium; Attendance: 300; Referee: Sergejus Sliva (Lithuania)

21 May 1995 1995 Baltic Cup	Latvia	2–0	Lithuania	Riga, Latvia
17:00 UTC+3	Zemļinskis 34' (pen.); Astafjevs 75'	Report		Stadium: Daugava Stadium; Attendance: 1,500; Referee: Oleg Timofejev (Estonia)

3 June 1995 UEFA Euro 1996 qualifying	Portugal	3–2	Latvia	Porto, Portugal
22:00 UTC+2	Figo 5'; Secretário 19'; Domingos 20'	Report	Rimkus 51', 85'	Stadium: Estádio das Antas; Attendance: 26,619; Referee: Zoran Petrović (FR Yugoslavia)

7 June 1995 UEFA Euro 1996 qualifying	Northern Ireland	1–2	Latvia	Belfast, Northern Ireland
20:00 UTC+1	Dowie 44'	Report	Zeiberliņš 59'; Astafjevs 62'	Stadium: Windsor Park; Attendance: 6,935; Referee: Juan Ansuátegui Roca (Spain)

16 August 1995 UEFA Euro 1996 qualifying	Latvia	3–2	Austria	Riga, Latvia
20:00 UTC+3	Rimkus 11', 59'; Zeiberliņš 88'	Report	Polster 68'; Ramusch 78'	Stadium: Daugava Stadium; Attendance: 2,600; Referee: Ilkka Koho (Finland)

6 September 1995 UEFA Euro 1996 qualifying	Latvia	1–0	Liechtenstein	Riga, Latvia
18:30 UTC+3	Zeiberliņš 83'	Report		Stadium: Daugava Stadium; Attendance: 3,800; Referee: Tom Henning Øvrebø (Norway)

11 October 1995 UEFA Euro 1996 qualifying	Republic of Ireland	2–1	Latvia	Dublin, Ireland
20:30 UTC+1	Aldridge 61' (pen.), 64'	Report	Rimkus 78'	Stadium: Lansdowne Road; Attendance: 33,500; Referee: Juan Fernández Marín (Spain)

=== 1996 ===
12 March 1996 Friendly	Cyprus	1–0	Latvia	Larnaca, Cyprus
15:30 UTC+2	Agathokleous 47'	Report		Stadium: GSZ Stadium; Attendance: 150; Referee: Giannakis Kyprianidis (Cyprus)

7 July 1996 1996 Baltic Cup	Estonia	1–1	Latvia	Narva, Estonia
18:00 UTC+3	Rooba 36'	Report	Bulders 16'	Stadium: Kreenholmi Stadium; Attendance: 350; Referee: Gintaras Dilda (Lithuania)

8 July 1996 1996 Baltic Cup	Lithuania	2–1	Latvia	Narva, Estonia
18:00 UTC+3	Ražanauskas 5' (pen.); Zdančius 68' (pen.)	Report	Jelisejevs 44'	Stadium: Kreenholmi Stadium; Attendance: 1,000; Referee: Jüri Saar (Estonia)

14 August 1996 Friendly	Latvia	0–0	Finland	Riga, Latvia
18:30 UTC+3		Report		Stadium: Daugavas Stadium; Attendance: 5,500; Referee: Oleg Timofejev (Estonia)

1 September 1996 1998 FIFA World Cup qualification	Latvia	1–2	Sweden	Riga, Latvia
19:00 UTC+3	Rimkus 56'	Report	Dahlin 16'; K. Andersson 21'	Stadium: Daugavas stadions Attendance: 9,200; Referee: László Vágner (Hungary)

5 October 1996 1998 FIFA World Cup qualification	Latvia	0–2	Scotland	Riga, Latvia
19:00 UTC+3		Report	Collins 18'; Jackson 80'	Stadium: Daugavas stadions Attendance: 9,500; Referee: Jiří Ulrich (Czech Republic)

9 October 1996 1998 FIFA World Cup qualification	Belarus	1–1	Latvia	Minsk, Belarus
18:30 UTC+3	Makowski 78'	Report	Zemļinskis 16'	Stadium: Dinamo; Attendance: 7,300; Referee: Sergo Kvaratskhelia (Georgia)

9 November 1996 1998 FIFA World Cup qualification	Austria	2–1	Latvia	Vienna, Austria
18:15 UTC+1	Polster 43'; Herzog 73'	Report	Rimkus 44'	Stadium: Ernst Happel Stadion; Attendance: 15,700; Referee: Milan Mitrović (Slovenia)

=== 1997 ===
14 February 1997 1997 Cyprus Tournament	Cyprus	2–0	Latvia	Paralimni, Cyprus
15:15 UTC+2	Georgiou 9'; Engomitis 20'	Report		Stadium: Paralimni Stadium; Attendance: 4,000; Referee: Andreas Georgiou (Cyprus)

15 February 1997 1997 Cyprus Tournament	Latvia	1–0	Lithuania	Deryneia, Cyprus
15:15 UTC+2	Jeļisejevs 66'	Report		Stadium: Anagennisi Football Ground; Attendance: 200; Referee: Andreas Georgiou (Cyprus)

17 February 1997 1997 Cyprus Tournament	Poland	3–2	Latvia	Deryneia, Cyprus
15:15 UTC+2	Kałużny 63'; Jegor 83'; Kryger 90'	Report	Blagonadeždins 22'; Pahars 55'	Stadium: Anagennisi Football Ground; Attendance: 100; Referee: Giannakis Kyprianidis (Cyprus)

2 April 1997 Friendly	Switzerland	1–0	Latvia	Lucerne, Switzerland
20:15 UTC+2	Kunz 90+3'	Report		Stadium: Stadion Allmend; Attendance: 9,100; Referee: Roger Philippi (Luxembourg)

30 April 1997 1998 FIFA World Cup qualification	Latvia	2–0	Belarus	Riga, Latvia
17:00 UTC+3	Ševļakovs 36', 83'	Report		Stadium: Daugavas stadions Attendance: 4,200; Referee: Ilkka Koho (Finland)

18 May 1997 1998 FIFA World Cup qualification	Estonia	1–3	Latvia	Tallinn, Estonia
19:00 UTC+3	Zelinski 5'	Report	Babičevs 53'; Jelisejevs 80'; Lemsalu 87' (o.g.)	Stadium: Kadriong; Attendance: 2,500; Referee: Darko Cvitkovic (Croatia)

8 June 1997 1998 FIFA World Cup qualification	Latvia	1–3	Austria	Riga, Latvia
19:00 UTC+3	Astafjevs 88'	Report	Heraf 55'; Polster 81'; Stöger 82'	Stadium: Daugavas stadions Attendance: 9,200; Referee: Dick Jol (Netherlands)

25 June 1997 Friendly	Latvia	4–1	Andorra	Riga, Latvia
19:00 UTC+3	Štolcers 36'; Bleidelis 58', 82'; Stepanovs 83'	Report	Sonejee 63'	Stadium: Daugava Stadium; Attendance: 1,400; Referee: Oleg Timofejev (Estonia)

10 July 1997 1997 Baltic Cup	Estonia	1–2	Latvia	Vilnius, Lithuania
14:00 UTC+3	Kristal 15'	Report	Babičevs 30'; Pahars 50'	Stadium: Žalgiris Stadium; Attendance: 150; Referee: Algirdas Dubinskas (Lithuania)

11 July 1997 1997 Baltic Cup	Lithuania	1–0	Latvia	Vilnius, Lithuania
	Ramelis 66'	Report		Stadium: Žalgiris Stadium; Attendance: 400; Referee: Oleg Timofejev (Estonia)

19 August 1997 Friendly	Latvia	0–0	Azerbaijan	Riga, Latvia
18:30 UTC+3				Stadium: Daugava Stadium; Attendance: 2,500; Referee: Mika Peltola (Finland)

6 September 1997 1998 FIFA World Cup qualification	Latvia	1–0	Estonia	Riga, Latvia
20:30 UTC+3	Zemļinskis 87' (pen.)	Report		Stadium: Daugavas stadions Attendance: 2,500; Referee: Otar Guntadze (Georgia)

10 September 1997 1998 FIFA World Cup qualification	Sweden	1–0	Latvia	Stockholm, Sweden
19:00 UTC+2	Jonson 88'	Report		Stadium: Råsunda Stadium; Attendance: 20,251; Referee: Markus Merk (Germany)

11 October 1997 1998 FIFA World Cup qualification	Scotland	2–0	Latvia	Glasgow, Scotland
15:00 UTC+1	Gallacher 43'; Durie 80'	Report		Stadium: Celtic Park; Attendance: 47,613; Referee: Sándor Piller (Hungary)

=== 1998 ===
6 February 1998 1998 Rothmans Tournament	Georgia	2–1	Latvia	Ta' Qali, Malta
	Jamarauli 50', 71'	Report	Bleidelis 86' (pen.)	Stadium: Ta' Qali National Stadium; Attendance: 3,000; Referee: Alfred Micaleff (Malta)

8 February 1998 1998 Rothmans Tournament	Malta	2–1	Latvia	Ta' Qali, Malta
16:00 UTC+1	Busuttil 57'; Brincat 85'	Report	Pahars 68'	Stadium: Ta' Qali National Stadium; Attendance: 3,000; Referee: Otar Guntadze (Georgia)

10 February 1998 1998 Rothmans Tournament	Albania	2–2	Latvia	Ta' Qali, Malta
14:00 UTC+1	Kola 44' (pen.), 46'	Report	Pahars 35', 53'	Stadium: Ta' Qali National Stadium; Attendance: 2,500; Referee: Lorry Sammut (Malta)

21 April 1998 1998 Baltic Cup	Latvia	1–2	Lithuania	Liepāja, Latvia
	Sļesarčuks 87'	Report	Stepanovs 20' (o.g.); Stumbrys 71'	Stadium: Daugava Stadium; Attendance: 2,500; Referee: Sten Kaldma (Estonia)

17 May 1998 Friendly	Latvia	1–5	Israel	Riga, Latvia
18:00 UTC+3	Lobaņovs 84'	Report	Nimni 16'; Talesnikov 23'; Ghrayib 31'; Tubi 63'; Mizrahi 79'	Stadium: Daugava Stadium; Attendance: 2,000; Referee: Ihor Yarmenchuk (Ukraine)

25 June 1998 1998 Baltic Cup	Estonia	0–2	Latvia	Valga, Estonia
		Report	Pahars 19'; Babičevs 87'	Stadium: Sportland Arena; Attendance: 300; Referee: Algirdas Dubinskas (Lithuania)

26 June 1998 Friendly	Latvia	2–0	Andorra	Pärnu, Estonia
19:00 UTC+3	Rimkus 75'; Bleidelis 82'	Report		Stadium: Pärnu Rannastaadion; Attendance: 70; Referee: Oleg Timofejev (Estonia)

19 August 1998 Friendly	Iceland	4–1	Latvia	Reykjavík, Iceland
20:00 UTC+0	Guðjónsson 54', 78'; Daðason 62'; Helgason 90'	Report	Šarando 49'	Stadium: Laugardalsvöllur; Attendance: 1,742; Referee: Lassin Isaksen (Faroe Islands)

6 September 1998 UEFA Euro 2000 qualifying	Norway	1–3	Latvia	Oslo, Norway
20:15 UTC+2	Solbakken 17'	Report	Pahars 11'; Štolcers 53'; Zemļinskis 64' (pen.)	Stadium: Ulleval; Attendance: 11,031; Referee: Sergei Shmolik (Belarus)

10 October 1998 UEFA Euro 2000 qualifying	Latvia	1–0	Georgia	Riga, Latvia
18:30 UTC+3	Štolcers 2'	Report		Stadium: Daugava Stadium; Attendance: 1,900; Referee: Constantin Zotta (Romania)

14 October 1998 UEFA Euro 2000 qualifying	Slovenia	1–0	Latvia	Maribor, Slovenia
20:00 UTC+2	Udovič 86'	Report		Stadium: Ljudski vrt Attendance: 3,292; Referee: Karen Nalbandyan (Armenia)

10 November 1998 Friendly	Tunisia	3–0	Latvia	Tunis, Tunisia
	Gabsi 13'; Hamrouni 45'; Kanzari 56'	Report		Stadium: Stade El Menzah; Attendance: 6,500; Referee: Abderrahmane Benbetka (Algeria)

=== 1999 ===
24 February 1999 Friendly	Israel	2–0	Latvia	Jerusalem, Israel
18:30 UTC+2	Revivo 21'; Harazi 27'	Report		Stadium: Teddy Stadium; Attendance: 6,000; Referee: Edgar Steinborn (Germany)

31 March 1999 UEFA Euro 2000 qualifying	Latvia	0–0	Greece	Riga, Latvia
20:00 UTC+3		Report		Stadium: Daugava Stadium; Attendance: 4,300; Referee: Knud Erik Fisker (Denmark)

28 April 1999 UEFA Euro 2000 qualifying	Latvia	0–0	Albania	Riga, Latvia
19:00 UTC+3		Report		Stadium: Daugava Stadium; Attendance: 2,700; Referee: Eric Romain (Belgium)

5 June 1999 UEFA Euro 2000 qualifying	Latvia	1–2	Slovenia	Riga, Latvia
18:30 UTC+3	Pahars 18'	Report	Zahovič 27', 43' (pen.)	Stadium: Daugava Stadium; Attendance: 2,800; Referee: Juan Manuel Brito Arceo (Spain)

9 June 1999 UEFA Euro 2000 qualifying	Greece	1–2	Latvia	Athens, Greece
21:00 UTC+3	Niniadis 37' (pen.)	Report	Verpakovskis 24'; Zemļinskis 90' (pen.)	Stadium: Spiros Louis Stadium; Attendance: 15,135; Referee: Lubomír Puček (Czech Republic)

26 June 1999 Friendly	Brazil	3–0	Latvia	Curitiba, Brazil
16:00 UTC-3	Alex 27'; Roberto Carlos 53'; Ronaldo 73'	Report		Stadium: Estádio Joaquim Américo Guimarães; Attendance: 30,000; Referee: Gustavo Gallesio (Uruguay)

4 September 1999 UEFA Euro 2000 qualifying	Albania	3–3	Latvia	Tirana, Albania
19:30 UTC+2	Bushi 29', 78'; Muka 90'	Report	Astafjevs 20', 62'; Štolcers 70'	Stadium: Qemal Stafa Stadium; Attendance: 4,000; Referee: Alain Hamer (Luxembourg)

8 September 1999 UEFA Euro 2000 qualifying	Georgia	2–2	Latvia	Tbilisi, Georgia
19:00 UTC+5	S. Arveladze 30'; Kavelashvili 52'	Report	Bleidelis 62'; Stepanovs 90'	Stadium: Boris Paichadze National Stadium; Attendance: 4,500; Referee: Miroslav Radoman (FR Yugoslavia)

9 October 1999 UEFA Euro 2000 qualifying	Latvia	1–2	Norway	Riga, Latvia
20:00 UTC+3	Pahars 52'	Report	Solskjær 51'; Flo 85'	Stadium: Daugava Stadium; Attendance: 2,500; Referee: Dietmar Drabek (Austria)

=== 2000 ===
2 February 2000 2000 Cyprus Tournament	Latvia	0–2	Romania	Paphos, Cyprus
14:30 UTC+2		Report	Roșu 18'; Niculae 69'	Stadium: Pafiako Stadium; Attendance: 300; Referee: Michalis Karaiskakis (Cyprus)

4 February 2000 2000 Cyprus Tournament	Slovakia	3–1	Latvia	Paphos, Cyprus
14:30 UTC+2	Kisel 30'; Mintál 48'; Babnič 51'	Report	Andrejs Štolcers 84'	Stadium: Pafiako Stadium; Attendance: 100; Referee: Tasos Papaioannou (Cyprus)

6 February 2000 2000 Cyprus Tournament	Lithuania	2–1	Latvia	Larnaca, Cyprus
14:30 UTC+2	Trakys 54'; Fomenka 89'	Report	Pelcis 4'	Stadium: Antonis Papadopoulos Stadium; Attendance: 1,200; Referee: Panikos Kailis (Cyprus)

26 April 2000 Friendly	Lithuania	2–1	Latvia	Kaunas, Lithuania
17:00 UTC+2	Dančenka 64'; Maciulevičius 87'	Report	Pelcis 12'	Stadium: Darius and Girėnas Stadium; Attendance: 2,000; Referee: Kazimir Znaydinski (Belarus)

3 June 2000 Friendly	Latvia	1–0	Finland	Riga, Latvia
18:30 UTC+2	Pelcis 59'	Report		Stadium: Daugava Stadium; Attendance: 2,000; Referee: Aleh Chikun (Belarus)

16 August 2000 Friendly	Latvia	0–1	Belarus	Riga, Latvia
17:00 UTC+2		Report	Vasilyuk 50'	Stadium: Skonto Stadium; Attendance: 4,500; Referee: Oleg Timofejev (Estonia)

3 September 2000 2002 FIFA World Cup qualification	Latvia	0–1	Scotland	Riga, Latvia
18:00 UTC+3		Report	McCann 89'	Stadium: Skonto stadions Attendance: 9,200; Referee: Andreas Schluchter (Switzerland)

7 October 2000 2002 FIFA World Cup qualification	Latvia	0–4	Belgium	Riga, Latvia
20:15 UTC+3		Report	Wilmots 5'; B. Peeters 13'; Cavens 83'; G. Verheyen 90'	Stadium: Skonto stadions Attendance: 7,311; Referee: Leslie Irvine (Northern Ireland)

15 November 2000 2002 FIFA World Cup qualification	San Marino	0–1	Latvia	Serravalle,San Marino
20:30 UTC+1		Report	Jeļisejevs 9'	Stadium: Stadio Olimpico; Attendance: 517; Referee: Darko Čeferin (Slovenia)

=== 2001 ===
28 February 2001 Friendly	Liechtenstein	0–2	Latvia	Vaduz, Liechtenstein
19:00 UTC+1		Report	Miholaps 63'; Verpakovskis 66'	Stadium: Rheinpark Stadion; Attendance: 700; Referee: Markus Nobs (Switzerland)

24 March 2001 2002 FIFA World Cup qualification	Croatia	4–1	Latvia	Osijek, Croatia
18:00 UTC+1	Balaban 8', 42', 45'; Vugrinec 89'	Report	Štolcers 60'	Stadium: Stadion Gradski vrt Attendance: 13,345; Referee: Martin Ingvarsson (Sweden)

25 April 2001 2002 FIFA World Cup qualification	Latvia	1–1	San Marino	Riga, Latvia
18:30 UTC+3	Pahars 1'	Report	Albani 59'	Stadium: Skonto stadions Attendance: 4,000; Referee: Karen Nalbandyan (Armenia)

2 June 2001 2002 FIFA World Cup qualification	Belgium	3–1	Latvia	Brussels, Belgium
20:00 UTC+2	Wilmots 2'; É. Mpenza 12'; Zemļinskis 50' (o.g.)	Report	Pahars 52'	Stadium: King Baudouin Stadium; Attendance: 32,000; Referee: Ivan Dobrinov (Bulgaria)

6 June 2001 2002 FIFA World Cup qualification	Latvia	0–1	Croatia	Riga, Latvia
18:00 UTC+3		Report	Balaban 40'	Stadium: Skonto stadions Attendance: 5,000; Referee: John McDermott (Republic of Ireland)

3 July 2001 2001 Baltic Cup	Latvia	3–1	Estonia	Riga, Latvia
18:30	Verpakovskis 41'; Pahars 50'; Koļesņičenko 90'		Zelinski 47'	Stadium: Daugava Stadium; Attendance: 3,500; Referee: Darius Miezelis (Lithuania)

5 July 2001 2001 Baltic Cup	Latvia	4–1	Lithuania	Riga, Latvia
18:30	Rubins 45'; Pahars 52'; Blagonadeždins 84'; Koļesņičenko 89'		Barasa 12'	Stadium: Daugava Stadium; Attendance: 4,000; Referee: Sten Kaldma (Estonia)

15 August 2001 Friendly	Latvia	0–1	Ukraine	Riga, Latvia
18:30 UTC+3		Report	Melaschenko 20'	Stadium: Skonto Stadium; Attendance: 7,500; Referee: Vladimír Hriňák (Slovakia)

6 October 2001 2002 FIFA World Cup qualification	Scotland	2–1	Latvia	Glasgow, Scotland
17:00 UTC+1	Freedman 44'; D. Weir 53'	Report	Rubins 21'	Stadium: Hampden Park; Attendance: 23,228; Referee: Terje Hauge (Norway)

14 November 2001 Friendly	Latvia	1–3	Russia	Riga, Latvia
18:00 UTC+2	Astafjevs 89'	Report	Khokhlov 8'; Alenichev 48'; Panov 81'	Stadium: Skonto Stadium; Attendance: 7,000; Referee: Sten Kaldma (Estonia)

=== 2002 ===
27 March 2002 Friendly	Luxembourg	0–3	Latvia	Hesperange, Luxembourg
20:00 UTC+1:00		Report	Rubins 24'; Laizāns 58'; Koļesņičenko 71'	Stadium: Stade Alphonse Theis; Attendance: 1,800; Referee: Wolfgang Sowa (Austria)

17 April 2002 Friendly	Latvia	2–1	Kazakhstan	Riga, Latvia
18:00 UTC+3:00	Zemļinskis 45'; Štolcers 89'	Summary	Shevchenko 45'	Stadium: Ventspils Olimpiskais Stadions; Attendance: 2,000; Referee: Paulius Malžinskas (Lithuania)

22 May 2002 Friendly	Finland	2–1	Latvia	Helsinki, Finland
19:00 UTC+3:00	Riihilahti 70'; Pasanen 83'	Report	Pahars 39'	Stadium: Helsinki Olympic Stadium; Attendance: 8,617; Referee: Kristinn Jakobsson (Iceland)

5 July 2002 Friendly	Latvia	0–0	Azerbaijan	Riga, Latvia
19:00 UTC+3:00		Report		Stadium: Skonto Stadium; Attendance: 2,000; Referee: Darius Mieželis (Lithuania)

21 August 2002 Friendly	Latvia	2–4	Belarus	Riga, Latvia
19:00 UTC+3	Verpakovskis 17'; Laizāns 26'	Report	Kutuzov; Kulchy 30'; Ramashchanka 64', 86'	Stadium: Skonto Stadium; Attendance: 4,200; Referee: Hannes Kaasik (Estonia)

7 September 2002 UEFA Euro 2004 qualifying	Latvia	0–0	Sweden	Riga, Latvia
20:00 UTC+03:00		Report		Stadium: Skonto Stadium; Attendance: 8,500; Referee: Frank De Bleeckere (Belgium)

12 October 2002 UEFA Euro 2004 qualifying	Poland	0–1	Latvia	Warsaw, Poland
19:00 UTC+02:00		Report	Laizāns 30'	Stadium: Stadion Wojska Polskiego; Attendance: 12,000; Referee: Massimo Busacca (Switzerland)

20 November 2002 UEFA Euro 2004 qualifying	San Marino	0–1	Latvia	Serravalle, San Marino
20:00 UTC+01:00		Report	Valentini 89' (o.g.)	Stadium: Stadio Olimpico; Attendance: 600; Referee: Asim Khudiev (Azerbaijan)

=== 2003 ===
12 February 2003 Friendly	Lithuania	1–2	Latvia	Antalya, Turkey
17:00 UTC+2:00	Blagonadeždins 32' (o.g.)	Report	Rubins 28'; Miholaps 58'	Stadium: Hotel World of Wonders Futbol Sahalarimiz; Attendance: 700; Referee: Ladislav Gádoši (Slovakia)

12 April 2003 Friendly	Ukraine	1–0	Latvia	Kyiv, Ukraine
19:00	Kalynychenko 83' (pen.)	Report		Stadium: Valeriy Lobanovskyi Dynamo Stadium; Attendance: 3,700; Referee: Ľuboš Micheľ (Slovakia)

30 April 2003 UEFA Euro 2004 qualifying	Latvia	3–0	San Marino	Riga, Latvia
19:00 UTC+03:00	Prohorenkovs 10'; Bleidelis 21', 74'	Report		Stadium: Skonto Stadium; Attendance: 7,500; Referee: Hubert Byrne (Republic of Ireland)

7 June 2003 UEFA Euro 2004 qualifying	Hungary	3–1	Latvia	Budapest, Hungary
20:15 UTC+02:00	Szabics 51', 58'; Gera 87'	Report	Verpakovskis 38'	Stadium: Ferenc Puskás Stadium; Attendance: 4,000; Referee: Markus Merk (Germany)

4 July 2003 2003 Baltic Cup	Lithuania	1–2	Latvia	Valga, Estonia
	Tamošauskas 73'	Report	Laizāns 28'; Rubins 32'	Stadium: Valga Linnastaadion; Attendance: 400; Referee: Peter Fröjdfeldt (Sweden)

5 July 2003 2003 Baltic Cup	Estonia	0–0	Latvia	Tallinn, Estonia
		Report		Stadium: A. Le Coq Arena; Attendance: 1,000; Referee: Martin Ingvarsson (Sweden)

20 August 2003 Friendly	Latvia	0–3	Uzbekistan	Riga, Latvia
19:00		Report	Akopyants 41'; Soliev 79'; Geynrikh 86'	Stadium: Skonto Stadium; Attendance: 4,000; Referee: Andriy Shandor (Ukraine)

6 September 2003 UEFA Euro 2004 qualifying	Latvia	0–2	Poland	Riga, Latvia
20:30 UTC+03:00		Report	Szymkowiak 36'; Kłos 39'	Stadium: Skonto Stadium; Attendance: 7,500; Referee: Kyros Vassaras (Greece)

10 September 2003 UEFA Euro 2004 qualifying	Latvia	3–1	Hungary	Riga, Latvia
21:00 UTC+03:00	Verpakovskis 38', 51'; Bleidelis 43'	Report	Lisztes 53'	Stadium: Skonto Stadium; Attendance: 4,500; Referee: Claus Bo Larsen (Denmark)

11 October 2003 UEFA Euro 2004 qualifying	Sweden	0–1	Latvia	Solna, Sweden
17:00 UTC+02:00		Report	Verpakovskis 22'	Stadium: Råsunda Stadium; Attendance: 32,095; Referee: Massimo De Santis (Italy)

15 November 2003 UEFA Euro 2004 qualifying play-off	Latvia	1–0	Turkey	Riga, Latvia
20:15 UTC+2	Verpakovskis 29'	Report		Stadium: Skonto Stadium; Attendance: 8,800; Referee: Gilles Veissière (France)

19 November 2003 UEFA Euro 2004 qualifying play-off	Turkey	2–2	Latvia	Istanbul, Turkey
20:30 UTC+2	Mansız 20'; Şükür 64'	Report	Laizāns 66'; Verpakovskis 78'	Stadium: İnönü Stadium; Attendance: 17,500; Referee: Anders Frisk (Sweden)
Note: Latvia won 3–2 on aggregate and qualified for UEFA Euro 2004.

20 December 2003 Friendly	Kuwait	2–0	Latvia	Paphos, Cyprus
	Waleed Ali 7'; Bashar Abdullah 69'	Report		Stadium: Pafiako Stadium; Attendance: 150; Referee: Costas Kapitanis (Cyprus)

=== 2004 ===
18 February 2004 2004 Cyprus Tournament	Latvia	3–1	Kazakhstan	Larnaca, Cyprus
15:00 (UTC+2)	Pahars 40'; Laizāns 45', 56'	Report	Aksenov 23'	Stadium: Antonis Papadopoulos Stadium; Attendance: 152; Referee: Kostas Konstantinou (Cyprus)

19 February 2004 2004 Cyprus Tournament	Hungary	2–1	Latvia	Limassol, Cyprus
19:00 (UTC+2)	Tököli 82'; Kenesei 85'	Report	Stepanovs 64'	Stadium: Tsirio Stadium; Attendance: 162; Referee: Panikos Kailis (Cyprus)

21 February 2004 2004 Cyprus Tournament	Latvia	1–4	Belarus	Larnaca, Cyprus
13:30 UTC+2	Zemļinskis 37' (pen.)	Report	Bulyga 20'; Ramashchanka 67' (pen.), 86' (pen.), 90+1'	Stadium: GSP Stadium; Attendance: 30; Referee: Kostas Theodotou (Cyprus)

31 March 2004 Friendly	Slovenia	0–1	Latvia	Celje, Slovenia
18:00 UTC+2		Report	Verpakovskis 36'	Stadium: Arena Petrol; Attendance: 2,300; Referee: Anton Stredák (Slovakia)

28 April 2004 Friendly	Latvia	0–0	Iceland	Riga, Latvia
18:00 (UTC+3)		Report		Stadium: Skonto Stadium; Attendance: 7,216; Referee: Sergey Shmolik (Belarus)

6 June 2004 Friendly	Latvia	2–2	Azerbaijan	Riga, Latvia
17:00 (UTC+3)	Verpakovskis 54'; Zemļinskis 82' (pen.)	(Report)	Quliyev 56'; Gurbanov 75'	Stadium: Skonto Stadium; Attendance: 6,000; Referee: Jari Maisonlahti (Finland)

15 June 2004 UEFA Euro 2004	Czech Republic	2–1	Latvia	Aveiro, Portugal
17:00	Baroš 73'; Heinz 85'	Report	Verpakovskis 45+1'	Stadium: Estádio Municipal de Aveiro; Attendance: 21,744; Referee: Gilles Veissière (France)

19 June 2004 UEFA Euro 2004	Latvia	0–0	Germany	Porto, Portugal
17:00		Report		Stadium: Estádio do Bessa; Attendance: 22,344; Referee: Mike Riley (England)

23 June 2004 UEFA Euro 2004	Netherlands	3–0	Latvia	Braga, Portugal
19:45	Van Nistelrooy 27' (pen.), 35'; Makaay 84'	Report		Stadium: Estádio Municipal de Braga; Attendance: 27,904; Referee: Kim Milton Nielsen (Denmark)

18 August 2004 Friendly	Latvia	0–2	Wales	Riga, Latvia
20:00		Report	Hartson 80'; Bellamy 89'	Stadium: Skonto Stadium; Attendance: 10,000; Referee: Ivan Ivanov (Russia)

4 September 2004 2006 FIFA World Cup qualification	Latvia	0–2	Portugal	Riga, Latvia
20:15		(Report)	Ronaldo 57'; Pauleta 58'	Stadium: Skonto stadions Attendance: 9,500; Referee: Graham Poll (England)

8 September 2004 2006 FIFA World Cup qualification	Luxembourg	3–4	Latvia	Luxembourg City, Luxembourg
20:00	Braun 11'; Leweck 55'; Cardoni 62'	(Report)	Verpakovskis 4'; Zemļinskis 40' (pen.); Hoffmann 65' (o.g.); Prohorenkovs 67'	Stadium: Stade Josy Barthel; Attendance: 2,125; Referee: George Kasnaferis (Greece)

9 October 2004 2006 FIFA World Cup qualification	Slovakia	4–1	Latvia	Bratislava, Slovakia
17:30	Németh 46'; L. Reiter 50'; Karhan 55', 87'	(Report)	Verpakovskis 3'	Stadium: Tehelné pole Attendance: 13,025; Referee: Stefano Farina (Italy)

13 October 2004 2006 FIFA World Cup qualification	Latvia	2–2	Estonia	Riga, Latvia
18:00	Astafjevs 65'; Laizāns 82'	(Report)	Oper 72'; Teever 79'	Stadium: Skonto stadions Attendance: 8,500; Referee: Florian Meyer (Germany)

17 November 2004 2006 FIFA World Cup qualification	Liechtenstein	1–3	Latvia	Vaduz, Liechtenstein
19:00	M. Frick 32'	(Report)	Verpakovskis 7'; Zemļinskis 57'; Prohorenkovs 89'	Stadium: Rheinpark Stadion; Attendance: 1,460; Referee: Zsolt Szabó (Hungary)

1 December 2004 Prime Minister`s Cup	Oman	3–2	Latvia	Riffa, Bahrain
	Kano 39'; Ayil 62'; Kamouna 90'	Report	Rimkus 67'; Rubins 69'	Stadium: Bahrain National Stadium; Attendance: 2,000; Referee: Jafaar Al Khabbaz (Bahrain)

3 December 2004 Prime Minister`s Cup	Bahrain	2–2 (4–2 p)	Latvia	Riffa, Bahrain
	Adnan 2'; Baba 72'	Report	Koļesņičenko 22' (pen.); Zakreševskis 35'	Stadium: Bahrain National Stadium; Attendance: 5,000; Referee: Abdullah Al Hilali (Oman)

=== 2005 ===
8 February 2005 2005 Cyprus Tournament	Finland	2–1	Latvia	Nicosia, Cyprus
18:45 UTC+2	Johansson 19'; Huusko 72'	Report	Zemļinskis 62' (pen.)	Stadium: GSP Stadium; Attendance: 50; Referee: Panikos Kailis (Cyprus)

9 February 2005 2005 Cyprus Tournament	Latvia	1–1 (5–3 p)	Austria	Limassol, Cyprus
18:45 UTC+2	Višņakovs 70'	Report	Sariyar 41'	Stadium: Tsirio Stadium; Attendance: 50; Referee: Costas Theodotou (Cyprus)

30 March 2005 2006 FIFA World Cup qualification	Latvia	4–0	Luxembourg	Riga, Latvia
19:00	Bleidelis 32'; Laizāns 38' (pen.); Verpakovskis 73', 90'	(Report)		Stadium: Skonto stadions Attendance: 8,203; Referee: Draženko Kovačić (Croatia)

21 May 2005 2005 Baltic Cup	Lithuania	2–0	Latvia	Kaunas, Lithuania
16:30	Morinas 25', 81'	Report		Stadium: Darius Girėnas Stadium; Attendance: 3,000; Referee: Jacek Granat (Poland)

4 June 2005 2006 FIFA World Cup qualification	Russia	2–0	Latvia	Saint Petersburg, Russia
18:00	Arshavin 56'; Loskov 78' (pen.)	(Report)		Stadium: Petrovsky Stadium; Attendance: 21,575; Referee: Éric Poulat (France)

8 June 2005 2006 FIFA World Cup qualification	Latvia	1–0	Liechtenstein	Riga, Latvia
18:30	Bleidelis 17'	(Report)		Stadium: Skonto stadions Attendance: 8,000; Referee: Jonas Eriksson (Sweden)

17 August 2005 2006 FIFA World Cup qualification	Latvia	1–1	Russia	Riga, Latvia
18:00	Astafjevs 6'	(Report)	Arshavin 24'	Stadium: Skonto stadions Attendance: 10,000; Referee: Graham Poll (England)

3 September 2005 2006 FIFA World Cup qualification	Estonia	2–1	Latvia	Tallinn, Estonia
18:00	Oper 11'; Smirnov 71'	(Report)	Laizāns 90'	Stadium: Lilleküla Stadium; Attendance: 8,970; Referee: Alberto Undiano Mallenco (Spain)

7 September 2005 2006 FIFA World Cup qualification	Latvia	1–1	Slovakia	Riga, Latvia
19:00	Laizāns 74'	(Report)	Vittek 35'	Stadium: Skonto stadions Attendance: 8,800; Referee: Konrad Plautz (Austria)

8 October 2005 Friendly	Latvia	2–2	Japan	Riga, Latvia
13:20 UTC+3	Rimkus 67'; Rubins 89'	Report	Takahara 5' (pen.); Nakamura 52'	Stadium: Skonto Stadium; Attendance: 6, 500; Referee: Jacek Granat (Poland)

12 October 2005 2006 FIFA World Cup qualification	Portugal	3–0	Latvia	Porto, Portugal
19:30	Pauleta 20', 22'; Viana 86'	(Report)		Stadium: Estádio do Dragão; Attendance: 35,000; Referee: Peter Fröjdfeldt (Sweden)

12 November 2005 Friendly	Belarus	3–1	Latvia	Vitebsk, Belarus
15:00 UTC+2	Karytska 27'; Karnilenka 52', 90'	Report	Višņakovs 24'	Stadium: Vitebsky Central Sport Complex; Attendance: 8,300; Referee: Igor Egorov (Russia)

24 December 2005 2005 King's Cup	Thailand	1–1	Latvia	Phang Nga, Thailand
17:00 UTC+7	Winothai 56'	Report	Soloņicins 19'	Stadium: Phang Nga Province Stadium; Attendance: 7 000; Referee: Sakhakh Hamid (United Arab Emirates)

26 December 2005 2005 King's Cup	North Korea	1–1	Latvia	Phuket, Thailand
16:30 UTC+7	An Chol-Hyok 28'	Report	Karlsons 65'	Stadium: Surakul Stadium; Attendance: 5,000; Referee: Chaiwat Kunsuta (Thailand)

28 December 2005 2005 King's Cup	Oman	1–2	Latvia	Phuket, Thailand
16:30 UTC+7	Al-Maghni 90'	Report	Karlsons 54'; Kalniņš 90+1'	Stadium: Surakul Stadium; Attendance: 5,000; Referee: Mongkol Rungklai (Thailand)

30 December 2005 2005 King's Cup	Latvia	2–1	North Korea	Phuket, Thailand
18:00 UTC+7	Karlsons 38'; Prohorenkovs 40'	Report	Hong Yong-Jo 47'	Stadium: Surakul Stadium; Attendance: 3,000; Referee: Chaiwat Kunsuta (Thailand)

=== 2006 ===
28 May 2006 Friendly	United States	1–0	Latvia	East Hartford, United States
19:00 UTC−4	McBride 43'	Report		Stadium: Rentschler Field; Attendance: 24,636; Referee: Steven Depiero (Canada)

16 August 2006 Friendly	Russia	1–0	Latvia	Moscow, Russia
19:00 UTC+4	Pogrebnyak 90+3'	Report		Stadium: Lokomotiv Stadium; Attendance: 20,000; Referee: Grzegorz Gilewski (Poland)

2 September 2006 UEFA Euro 2008 qualifying	Latvia	0–1	Sweden	Riga, Latvia
20:00 UTC+3		Report	Källström 38'	Stadium: Skonto Stadions; Attendance: 7,500; Referee: Darko Ceferin (Slovenia)

6 September 2006 Friendly	Luxembourg	0–0	Latvia	Hesperange, Luxembourg
20:00 UTC+2		Report		Stadium: Stade Alphonse Theis; Attendance: 1,755; Referee: Emil Božinovski (Macedonia)

7 October 2006 UEFA Euro 2008 qualifying	Latvia	4–0	Iceland	Riga, Latvia
21:00 UTC+3	Karlsons 14'; Verpakovskis 15', 25'; Višņakovs 52'	Report		Stadium: Skonto Stadions; Attendance: 7,500; Referee: Alan Kelly (Republic of Ireland)

11 October 2006 UEFA Euro 2008 qualifying	Northern Ireland	1–0	Latvia	Belfast, Northern Ireland
20:00 UTC+1	Healy 35'	Report		Stadium: Windsor Park; Attendance: 14,500; Referee: Helmut Fleischer (Germany)

=== 2007 ===
6 February 2007 2007 Cyprus Tournament	Bulgaria	2–0	Latvia	Larnaca, Cyprus
17:30 UTC+2	Surņins 18' (o.g.); Yovov 33'	Report		Stadium: GSZ Stadium; Attendance: 400; Referee: Panikos Andronikou (Cyprus)

7 February 2007 2007 Cyprus Tournament	Hungary	2–0	Latvia	Limassol, Cyprus
17:00 UTC+2	Priskin 32', 52'	Report		Stadium: Tsirion Stadium; Attendance: 120; Referee: Panikos Kailis (Cyprus)

28 March 2007 UEFA Euro 2008 qualifying	Liechtenstein	1–0	Latvia	Vaduz, Liechtenstein
19:30 UTC+2	M. Frick 17'	Report		Stadium: Rheinpark; Attendance: 1,680; Referee: Serge Gumienny (Belgium)

2 June 2007 UEFA Euro 2008 qualifying	Latvia	0–2	Spain	Riga, Latvia
21:30 UTC+3		Report	Villa 45'; Xavi 60'	Stadium: Skonto Stadions; Attendance: 10,000; Referee: Craig Thomson (Scotland)

6 June 2007 UEFA Euro 2008 qualifying	Latvia	0–2	Denmark	Riga, Latvia
21:30 UTC+3		Report	Rommedahl 15', 17'	Stadium: Skonto Stadions; Attendance: 7,500; Referee: Matteo Trefoloni (Italy)

22 August 2007 Friendly	Latvia	1–2	Moldova	Riga, Latvia
19:35 UTC+3	Astafjevs 31'	Report	Frunză 23'; Bordian 53'	Stadium: Skonto Stadium; Attendance: 4,500; Referee: Andriy Shandor (Ukraine)

8 September 2007 UEFA Euro 2008 qualifying	Latvia	1–0	Northern Ireland	Riga, Latvia
19:15 UTC+3	Baird 56' (o.g.)	Report		Stadium: Skonto Stadions; Attendance: 7,500; Referee: Pedro Proença (Portugal)

12 September 2007 UEFA Euro 2008 qualifying	Spain	2–0	Latvia	Oviedo, Spain
22:00 UTC+2	Xavi 13'; Torres 86'	Report		Stadium: Estadio Carlos Tartiere; Attendance: 25,000; Referee: Alon Yefet (Israel)

13 October 2007 UEFA Euro 2008 qualifying	Iceland	2–4	Latvia	Reykjavík, Iceland
16:00 UTC+0	Guðjohnsen 4', 52'	Report	Kļava 27'; Laizāns 31'; Verpakovskis 37', 46'	Stadium: Laugardalsvöllur; Attendance: 5,865; Referee: Mike Dean (England)

17 October 2007 UEFA Euro 2008 qualifying	Denmark	3–1	Latvia	Copenhagen, Denmark
20:00 UTC+2	Tomasson 7' (pen.); U. Laursen 27'; Rommedahl 90'	Report	Gorkšs 80'	Stadium: Parken Stadium; Attendance: 19,004; Referee: Cüneyt Çakır (Turkey)

17 November 2007 UEFA Euro 2008 qualifying	Latvia	4–1	Liechtenstein	Riga, Latvia
18:00 UTC+2	Karlsons 14'; Verpakovskis 30'; Laizāns 63'; Višņakovs 87'	Report	Zirnis 13' (o.g.)	Stadium: Skonto Stadions; Attendance: 4,800; Referee: Svein Oddvar Moen (Norway)

21 November 2007 UEFA Euro 2008 qualifying	Sweden	2–1	Latvia	Solna, Sweden
20:00 UTC+1	Allbäck 1'; Källström 57'	Report	Laizāns 26'	Stadium: Råsunda Stadion; Attendance: 26,128; Referee: Wolfgang Stark (Germany)

=== 2008 ===
6 February 2008 Friendly	Georgia	1–3	Latvia	Tbilisi, Georgia
17:00 UTC+4	Kaladze 46'	Report	Karlsons 7'; Stepanovs 16'; Astafjevs 34'	Stadium: Boris Paichadze Dinamo Arena; Attendance: 6,000; Referee: Syarhey Shmolik (Belarus)

26 March 2008 Friendly	Andorra	0–3	Latvia	Andorra la Vella, Andorra
20:00 UTC+1		Report	Ivanovs 10'; Perepļotkins 24'; Rimkus 41'	Stadium: Estadi Comunal d'Andorra la Vella; Attendance: 500; Referee: Duarte Gomes (Portugal)

30 May 2008 2008 Baltic Cup	Latvia	1–0	Estonia	Riga, Latvia
19:07 EEST (UTC+03)	Laizāns 48' (pen.)	Report		Stadium: Skonto stadions Attendance: 4,500; Referee: Audrius Zuta (Lithuania)

1 June 2008 2008 Baltic Cup	Latvia	2–1	Lithuania	Riga, Latvia
14:00 EEST (UTC+03)	Gorkšs 56'; Alunderis 77' (o.g.)	Report	81' Beniušis	Stadium: Skonto stadions Attendance: 3,330; Referee: Sten Kaldma (Estonia)

20 August 2008 Friendly	Romania	1–0	Latvia	Urziceni, Romania
20:45 UTC+3	Dică 52' (pen.)	Report		Stadium: Stadionul Tineretului; Attendance: 7,000; Referee: Tom Øvrebø (Norway)

6 September 2008 2010 FIFA World Cup qualification	Moldova	1–2	Latvia	Tiraspol, Moldova
19:00 UTC+3	Alexeev 76'	Report	Karlsons 8'; Astafjevs 22'	Stadium: Sheriff Stadium; Attendance: 4,300; Referee: Mark Courtney (Northern Ireland)

10 September 2008 2010 FIFA World Cup qualification	Latvia	0–2	Greece	Riga, Latvia
21:15 UTC+3		Report	Gekas 10', 49'	Stadium: Skonto Stadions; Attendance: 8,600; Referee: Tony Chapron (France)

11 October 2008 2010 FIFA World Cup qualification	Switzerland	2–1	Latvia	St. Gallen, Switzerland
17:45 UTC+2	Frei 63'; Nkufo 73'	Report	Ivanovs 71'	Stadium: AFG Arena; Attendance: 18,026; Referee: Lucílio Batista (Portugal)

15 October 2008 2010 FIFA World Cup qualification	Latvia	1–1	Israel	Riga, Latvia
19:00 UTC+3	Koļesņičenko 89'	Report	Benayoun 50'	Stadium: Skonto Stadions; Attendance: 7,100; Referee: Vladimír Hriňák (Slovakia)

12 November 2008 Friendly	Estonia	1–1	Latvia	Tallinn, Estonia
20:00 UTC+3	Kink 52'	Report	Grebis 75'	Stadium: Lilleküla Stadium; Attendance: 2,000; Referee: Brage Sandmoen (Norway)

=== 2009 ===
11 February 2009 Friendly	Armenia	0–0	Latvia	Limassol, Cyprus
15:00 UTC+2		Report		Stadium: Tsirio Stadium; Attendance: 150

28 March 2009 2010 FIFA World Cup qualification	Luxembourg	0–4	Latvia	Luxembourg City, Luxembourg
17:00 UTC+1		Report	Karlsons 25'; Cauņa 48'; Višņakovs 71'; Perepļotkins 86'	Stadium: Stade Josy Barthel; Attendance: 2,516; Referee: Mark Whitby (Wales)

1 April 2009 2010 FIFA World Cup qualification	Latvia	2–0	Luxembourg	Riga, Latvia
18:30 UTC+3	Žigajevs 44'; Verpakovskis 76'	Report		Stadium: Skonto Stadions; Attendance: 6,700; Referee: Fırat Aydınus (Turkey)

12 August 2009 Friendly	Bulgaria	1–0	Latvia	Sofia, Bulgaria
19:15 UTC+3	Rangelov 54'	Report		Stadium: Vasil Levski National Stadium; Attendance: 1,500; Referee: Vasilis Pamboridis (Greece)

5 September 2009 2010 FIFA World Cup qualification	Israel	0–1	Latvia	Ramat Gan, Israel
21:00 UTC+3		Report	Gorkšs 59'	Stadium: Ramat Gan Stadium; Attendance: 20,000; Referee: Knut Kircher (Germany)

9 September 2009 2010 FIFA World Cup qualification	Latvia	2–2	Switzerland	Riga, Latvia
21:30 UTC+3	Cauņa 62'; Astafjevs 75'	Report	Frei 43'; Derdiyok 80'	Stadium: Skonto Stadions; Attendance: 8,600; Referee: Pavel Královec (Czech Republic)

10 October 2009 2010 FIFA World Cup qualification	Greece	5–2	Latvia	Athens, Greece
21:30 UTC+3	Gekas 4', 47' (pen.), 57', 90+1'; Samaras 73'	Report	Verpakovskis 12', 40'	Stadium: Olympic Stadium; Attendance: 18,981; Referee: Tom Henning Øvrebø (Norway)

14 October 2009 2010 FIFA World Cup qualification	Latvia	3–2	Moldova	Riga, Latvia
21:00 UTC+3	Rubins 32', 44'; Grebis 76'	Report	Ovseannicov 25'; Sofroni 90'	Stadium: Skonto Stadions; Attendance: 3,800; Referee: Jouni Hyytiä (Finland)

14 November 2009 Friendly	Honduras	2–1	Latvia	Tegucigalpa, Honduras
17:30 UTC-6	Costly 41'; Welcome 86'	Report	Koļesņičenko 45' (pen.)	Stadium: Estadio Tiburcio Carías Andino; Attendance: 10,000; Referee: Wálter Quesada (Costa Rica)

=== 2010 ===
22 January 2010 Friendly	South Korea	1–0	Latvia	Málaga, Spain
15:10 UTC+1	Kim Jae-sung 55'	Report		Stadium: Estadio Ciudad de Málaga; Attendance: 150; Referee: Carlos Velasco Carballo (Spain)

3 March 2010 Friendly	Angola	1–1	Latvia	Luanda, Angola
17:00 UTC+1	Job 75'	Report	Karlsons 44'	Stadium: Estádio 11 de Novembro; Attendance: 17,000; Referee: António Caxala (Angola)

5 June 2010 Friendly	Ghana	1–0	Latvia	Milton Keynes, England
15:00 UTC+1	Owusu-Abeyie 89'	Report		Stadium: stadium:mk Attendance: 5,000; Referee: Mark Clattenburg (England)

18 June 2010 2010 Baltic Cup	Lithuania	0–0	Latvia	Kaunas, Lithuania
18:10 EEST (UTC+3)		Report		Stadium: S. Darius and S. Girėnas Stadium; Attendance: 1,000; Referee: Hannes Kaasik (Estonia)

19 June 2010 2010 Baltic Cup	Latvia	0–0	Estonia	Kaunas, Lithuania
18:10 EEST (UTC+3)		Report		Stadium: S. Darius and S. Girėnas Stadium; Attendance: 300; Referee: Gediminas Mažeika (Lithuania)

11 August 2010 Friendly	Czech Republic	4–1	Latvia	Liberec, Czech Republic
20:15 UTC+2	Bednář 49'; Fenin 54'; Pospěch 74'; Necid 77'	Report	Cauņa 90+2'	Stadium: Stadion u Nisy; Attendance: 7,456; Referee: Serhiy Danylovskyi (Ukraine)

3 September 2010 UEFA Euro 2012 qualifying	Latvia	0–3	Croatia	Riga, Latvia
21:00 UTC+3		Report	Petrić 43'; Olić 51'; Srna 82'	Stadium: Skonto Stadium; Attendance: 7,600; Referee: Björn Kuipers (Netherlands)

7 September 2010 UEFA Euro 2012 qualifying	Malta	0–2	Latvia	Ta'Qali, Malta
19:30 UTC+2		Report	Gorkšs 43'; Verpakovskis 85'	Stadium: Ta'Qali Stadium; Attendance: 6,255; Referee: Tony Asumaa (Finland)

8 October 2010 UEFA Euro 2012 qualifying	Greece	1–0	Latvia	Piraeus, Greece
21:45 UTC+3	Torosidis 58'	Report		Stadium: Karaiskakis Stadium; Attendance: 13,520; Referee: Antonio Damato (Italy)

12 October 2010 UEFA Euro 2012 qualifying	Latvia	1–1	Georgia	Riga, Latvia
20:00 UTC+3	Cauņa 90+1'	Report	Siradze 74'	Stadium: Skonto Stadium; Attendance: 4,330; Referee: Manuel De Sousa (Portugal)

17 November 2010 Friendly	China	1–0	Latvia	Kunming, China
19:00 UTC+8	Yang Xu 90+3'	Report		Stadium: Tuodong Stadium; Attendance: 15,000; Referee: Ko Hyung-Jin (South Korea)

=== 2011 ===
9 February 2011 Friendly	Latvia	2–1	Bolivia	Antalya, Turkey
18:00 UTC+2	Verpakovskis 42' (pen.); Cauna 51' (pen.)	Report	Arce 55' (pen.)	Stadium: Mardan Sports Complex; Attendance: 200; Referee: Siniša Zrnić (Bosnia and Herzegovina)

26 March 2011 UEFA Euro 2012 qualifying	Israel	2–1	Latvia	Tel Aviv, Israel
21:00 UTC+2	Barda 16'; Kayal 81'	Report	Gorkšs 62'	Stadium: Bloomfield Stadium; Attendance: 10,801; Referee: Milorad Mažić (Serbia)

4 June 2011 UEFA Euro 2012 qualifying	Latvia	1–2	Israel	Riga, Latvia
19:30 UTC+3	Cauņa 62' (pen.)	Report	Benayoun 19'; Ben Haim I 43' (pen.)	Stadium: Skonto Stadium; Attendance: 6,147; Referee: Alan Kelly (Republic of Ireland)

7 June 2011 Friendly	Austria	3–1	Latvia	Graz, Austria
20:30 UTC+2	Dibon 75'; Harnik 81', 90+6' (pen.)	Report	Mihadjuks 49'	Stadium: UPC-Arena; Attendance: 8,500; Referee: Simon Lee Evans (Wales)

10 August 2011 Friendly	Latvia	0–2	Finland	Riga, Latvia
19:30 UTC+3		Report	Hämäläinen 58'; Furuholm 87'	Stadium: Skonto Stadium; Attendance: 5,314; Referee: Vladislav Bezborodov (Russia)

2 September 2011 UEFA Euro 2012 qualifying	Georgia	0–1	Latvia	Tbilisi, Georgia
21:00 UTC+4		Report	Cauņa 63'	Stadium: Mikheil Meskhi Stadium; Attendance: 15,422; Referee: Leontios Trattou (Cyprus)

6 September 2011 UEFA Euro 2012 qualifying	Latvia	1–1	Greece	Riga, Latvia
21:30 UTC+3	Cauņa 19'	Report	K. Papadopoulos 84'	Stadium: Skonto Stadium; Attendance: 5,415; Referee: Stanislav Todorov (Bulgaria)

7 October 2011 UEFA Euro 2012 qualifying	Latvia	2–0	Malta	Riga, Latvia
20:00 UTC+3	Višņakovs 33'; Rudņevs 83'	Report		Stadium: Skonto Stadium; Attendance: 4,315; Referee: Richard Trutz (Slovakia)

11 October 2011 UEFA Euro 2012 qualifying	Croatia	2–0	Latvia	Rijeka, Croatia
19:00 UTC+2	Eduardo 66'; Mandžukić 72'	Report		Stadium: Stadion Kantrida; Attendance: 8,370; Referee: Antony Gautier (France)

=== 2012 ===
29 February 2012 Friendly	Kazakhstan	0–0	Latvia	Antalya, Turkey
15:30 UTC+2		Summary		Stadium: Antalya Atatürk Stadium; Attendance: 100; Referee: Viaceslav Banari (Moldova)

22 May 2012 Friendly	Latvia	0–1	Poland	Klagenfurt, Austria
20:45 UTC+2		Report	Sobiech 82'	Stadium: Wörthersee Stadion; Attendance: 734; Referee: Harald Lechner (Austria)

1 June 2012 2012 Baltic Cup	Latvia	5–0	Lithuania	Võru, Estonia
17:30 UTC+3	Cauņa 12' (pen.); Gauračs 17', 48'; Višņakovs 35'; Smirnovs 80'	Report		Stadium: Võru Stadium; Attendance: 130; Referee: Mattias Gestranius (Finland)

3 June 2012 2012 Baltic Cup	Finland	1–1 (5–6 p)	Latvia	Võru, Estonia
13:30 UTC+3	Kolehmainen 52'	Report	Gauračs 54'	Stadium: Võru Stadium; Attendance: 280; Referee: Gediminas Mažeika (Lithuanian)
	Penalties
	Pukki (penalty missed); Sjölund (penalty scored); Kuqi (penalty scored); Ojala (penalty scored); Pasanen (penalty scored); Sparv (penalty scored); Hurme (penalty missed); Kolehmainen (penalty missed)		(penalty missed) Cauņa; (penalty scored) Smirnovs; (penalty scored) Laizāns; (penalty scored) Kamešs; (penalty scored) Zjuzins; (penalty scored) Kļava; (penalty missed) Bulvītis; (penalty scored) Kozlovs

15 August 2012 Friendly	Montenegro	2–0	Latvia	Podgorica, Montenegro
20:30 UTC+2	Jovetić 36'; Kasalica 76'	Report		Stadium: Podgorica City Stadium; Attendance: 4,500; Referee: Danilo Grujić (Serbia)

7 September 2012 2014 FIFA World Cup qualification	Latvia	1–2	Greece	Riga, Latvia
21:30 UTC+3	Cauņa 41' (pen.)	Report	Spyropoulos 57'; Gekas 69'	Stadium: Skonto stadions Attendance: 7,956; Referee: Ivan Bebek (Croatia)

11 September 2012 2014 FIFA World Cup qualification	Bosnia and Herzegovina	4–1	Latvia	Zenica, Bosnia and Herzegovina
20:00 UTC+2	Misimović 12', 54'; Pjanić 44'; Džeko 90+2'	Report	Gorkšs 5'	Stadium: Stadion Bilino Polje; Attendance: 11,900; Referee: Deniz Aytekin (Germany)

12 October 2012 2014 FIFA World Cup qualification	Slovakia	2–1	Latvia	Bratislava, Slovakia
20:15 UTC+2	Hamšík 5' (pen.); Sapara 9'	Report	Verpakovskis 84' (pen.)	Stadium: Štadión Pasienky; Attendance: 4,012; Referee: Danny Makkelie (Netherlands)

16 October 2012 2014 FIFA World Cup qualification	Latvia	2–0	Liechtenstein	Riga, Latvia
20:00 UTC+3	Kamešs 29'; Gauračs 77'	Report		Stadium: Skonto stadions Attendance: 3,500; Referee: István Kovács (Hungary)

=== 2013 ===
6 February 2013 Friendly	Japan	3–0	Latvia	Kobe, Japan
18:20 (UTC+9)	Okazaki 41', 61'; Honda 60'	Report		Stadium: Home's Stadium Kobe; Attendance: 28,607; Referee: Kim Jong-hyeok (South Korea)

22 March 2013 2014 FIFA World Cup qualification	Liechtenstein	1–1	Latvia	Vaduz, Liechtenstein
19:30 UTC+1	Polverino 17'	Report	Cauņa 30'	Stadium: Rheinpark Stadion; Attendance: 1,150; Referee: Kevin Clancy (Scotland)

24 May 2013 Friendly	Qatar	3–1	Latvia	Al Rayyan, Qatar
19:00 (UTC+3)	Majid 36'; Mohammed 67'; Al Marri 82'	Report	Žigajevs 22'	Stadium: Jassim Bin Hamad Stadium; Attendance: 1,000; Referee: Sándor Andó-Szabó (Hungary)

28 May 2013 Friendly	Turkey	3–3	Latvia	Duisburg, Germany
20:45 (UTC+2)	Şahan 8'; İnan 23' (pen.); Sarı 59'	Report	Gauračs 53'; Šabala 68', 84'	Stadium: Schauinsland-Reisen-Arena; Attendance: 7,245; Referee: Thorsten Kinhöfer (Germany)

7 June 2013 2014 FIFA World Cup qualification	Latvia	0–5	Bosnia and Herzegovina	Riga, Latvia
19:30 UTC+3		Report	Lulić 48'; Ibišević 53'; Medunjanin 63'; Pjanić 80'; Džeko 82'	Stadium: Skonto stadions Attendance: 7,700; Referee: Mike Dean (England)

14 August 2013 Friendly	Estonia	1–1	Latvia	Tallinn, Estonia
19:00 (UTC+3)	Kruglov 68'	Report	Zjuzins 74'	Stadium: A. Le Coq Arena; Attendance: 5,686; Referee: Michael Lerjéus (Sweden)

6 September 2013 2014 FIFA World Cup qualification	Latvia	2–1	Lithuania	Riga, Latvia
21:10 UTC+3	Bulvītis 20'; Zjuzins 42'	Report	Matulevičius 44'	Stadium: Skonto stadions Attendance: 7,306; Referee: Sébastien Delferiere (Belgium)

10 September 2013 2014 FIFA World Cup qualification	Greece	1–0	Latvia	Athens, Greece
21:45 UTC+3	Salpingidis 58'	Report		Stadium: Karaiskakis Stadium; Attendance: 18,983; Referee: Kristinn Jakobsson (Iceland)

11 October 2013 2014 FIFA World Cup qualification	Lithuania	2–0	Latvia	Vilnius, Lithuania
18:30 UTC+3	Černych 7'; Mikoliūnas 68'	Report		Stadium: LFF stadionas Attendance: 2,900; Referee: Petur Reinert (Faroe Islands)

15 October 2013 2014 FIFA World Cup qualification	Latvia	2–2	Slovakia	Riga, Latvia
21:10 UTC+3	Šabala 47'; Rode 90+2'	Report	Jakubko 9'; Saláta 16'	Stadium: Skonto stadions Attendance: 3,813; Referee: Yevhen Aranovskiy (Ukraine)

15 November 2013 Friendly	Republic of Ireland	3–0	Latvia	Dublin, Ireland
19:45 (UTC+0)	Keane 22'; McGeady 68'; Long 79'	Report		Stadium: Aviva Stadium; Attendance: 37,100; Referee: Andreas Ekberg (Sweden)

=== 2014 ===
5 March 2014 Friendly	Macedonia	2–1	Latvia	Skopje, Macedonia
19:00 UTC+2	Kostovski 29'; A. Ibraimi 72' (pen.)	Report	Georgievski 65' (o.g.)	Stadium: Philip II Arena; Attendance: 4,000; Referee: Lorens Jemini (Albania)

29 May 2014 2014 Baltic Cup	Latvia	0–0 (4–2 p)	Estonia	Liepāja, Latvia
20:15 UTC+3		Report		Stadium: Daugava Stadium; Attendance: 2,115; Referee: Sergejus Slyva (Lithuania)
	Penalties
	Zjuzins (penalty scored); Laizāns (penalty scored); Fertovs (penalty scored); Višņakovs (penalty scored)		(penalty scored) Vassiljev; (penalty missed) Vunk; (penalty scored) Kallaste; (penalty missed) Mets

31 May 2014 2014 Baltic Cup	Latvia	1–0	Lithuania	Liepāja, Latvia
20:00 UTC+3	Bulvitis 6'	Report		Stadium: Daugava Stadium; Attendance: 2,300; Referee: Kristo Tohver (Estonia)

3 September 2014 Friendly	Latvia	2–0	Armenia	Riga, Latvia
20:45 UTC+3	Šabala 16', 75'	Report		Stadium: Skonto Stadium; Attendance: 4,215; Referee: Gediminas Mažeika (Lithuania)

9 September 2014 UEFA Euro 2016 qualifying	Kazakhstan	0–0	Latvia	Astana, Kazakhstan
18:00 (22:00 UTC+6)		Report		Stadium: Astana Arena; Attendance: 10,200; Referee: Ivan Kružliak (Slovakia)

10 October 2014 UEFA Euro 2016 qualifying	Latvia	0–3	Iceland	Riga, Latvia
20:45 (21:45 UTC+3)		Report	G. Sigurðsson 66'; Gunnarsson 77'; Gíslason 90'	Stadium: Skonto Stadium; Attendance: 6,354; Referee: Robert Schörgenhofer (Austria)

13 October 2014 UEFA Euro 2016 qualifying	Latvia	1–1	Turkey	Riga, Latvia
20:45 (21:45 UTC+3)	Šabala 54' (pen.)	Report	Kısa 47'	Stadium: Skonto Stadium; Attendance: 6,442; Referee: Bobby Madden (Scotland)

16 November 2014 UEFA Euro 2016 qualifying	Netherlands	6–0	Latvia	Amsterdam, Netherlands
18:00 (18:00 UTC+1)	Van Persie 6'; Robben 35', 82'; Huntelaar 42', 89'; Bruma 78'	Report		Stadium: Amsterdam Arena; Attendance: 47,500; Referee: Liran Liany (Israel)

=== 2015 ===
28 March 2015 UEFA Euro 2016 qualifying	Czech Republic	1–1	Latvia	Prague, Czech Republic
18:00 (18:00 UTC+1)	Pilař 90'	Report	A. Višņakovs 30'	Stadium: Eden Arena; Attendance: 13,722; Referee: Javier Estrada Fernández (Spain)

31 March 2015 Friendly	Ukraine	1–1	Latvia	Lviv, Ukraine
20:00 UTC+1	Yarmolenko 35'	Report	Maksimenko 90+2'	Stadium: Arena Lviv; Attendance: 17,500; Referee: Harald Lechner (Austria)

12 June 2015 UEFA Euro 2016 qualifying	Latvia	0–2	Netherlands	Riga, Latvia
20:45 (21:45 UTC+3)		Report	Wijnaldum 67'; Narsingh 71'	Stadium: Skonto Stadium; Attendance: 8,067; Referee: Svein Oddvar Moen (Norway)

3 September 2015 UEFA Euro 2016 qualifying	Turkey	1–1	Latvia	Konya, Turkey
20:45 (21:45 UTC+3)	İnan 77'	Report	Šabala 90+1'	Stadium: Torku Arena; Attendance: 35,900; Referee: Stefan Johannesson (Sweden)

6 September 2015 UEFA Euro 2016 qualifying	Latvia	1–2	Czech Republic	Riga, Latvia
18:00 (19:00 UTC+3)	Zjuzins 73'	Report	Limberský 13'; Darida 25'	Stadium: Skonto Stadium; Attendance: 7,913; Referee: Deniz Aytekin (Germany)

10 October 2015 UEFA Euro 2016 qualifying	Iceland	2–2	Latvia	Reykjavík, Iceland
18:00 (16:00 UTC±0)	Sigþórsson 5'; G. Sigurðsson 27'	Report	Cauņa 49'; Šabala 68'	Stadium: Laugardalsvöllur; Attendance: 9,767; Referee: Aleksei Eskov (Russia)

13 October 2015 UEFA Euro 2016 qualifying	Latvia	0–1	Kazakhstan	Riga, Latvia
20:45 (21:45 UTC+3)		Report	Kuat 65'	Stadium: Skonto Stadium; Attendance: 7,027; Referee: Steven McLean (Scotland)

13 November 2015 Friendly	Northern Ireland	1–0	Latvia	Belfast, Northern Ireland
19:45 UTC±0	Davis 55'	Report		Stadium: Windsor Park; Attendance: 11,707; Referee: Mohammed Al-Hoaish (Saudi Arabia)

=== 2016 ===
25 March 2016 Friendly	Slovakia	0–0	Latvia	Trnava, Slovakia
20:30 (UTC+1)		Report		Stadium: Štadión Antona Malatinského; Attendance: 12,405; Referee: Harald Lechner (Austria)

29 March 2016 Friendly	Gibraltar	0–5	Latvia	Gibraltar
20:00 (UTC+2)		Report	Ikaunieks 46', 84'; Dubra 53'; Sabala 56'; Visnakovs 81'	Stadium: Victoria Stadium; Attendance: 1,000; Referee: Alan Mario Sant (Malta)

1 June 2016 2016 Baltic Cup	Latvia	2–1	Lithuania	Liepāja, Latvia
19:30 (UTC+3)	Zjuzins 51'; Rudņevs 72'	Report	Černych 84'	Stadium: Daugava Stadium; Attendance: 2,305; Referee: Roomer Tarajev (Estonia)

4 June 2016 2016 Baltic Cup	Estonia	0–0	Latvia	Tallinn, Estonia
19:00 (UTC+3)		Report		Stadium: Lilleküla Stadium; Attendance: 1,982; Referee: Gediminas Mažeika (Lithuania)

2 September 2016 Friendly	Latvia	3–1	Luxembourg	Riga, Latvia
20:30 (UTC+3)	Ikaunieks 3'; Zjuzins 47', 51'	Report	da Mota 46'	Stadium: Skonto Stadium; Attendance: 4,632; Referee: Andrew Davey (Northern Ireland)

6 September 2016 2018 FIFA World Cup qualification	Andorra	0–1	Latvia	Andorra la Vella, Andorra
20:45 (20:45 UTC+2)		Report (FIFA); Report (UEFA)	Šabala 48'	Stadium: Estadi Nacional; Attendance: 1,115; Referee: Clayton Pisani (Malta)

7 October 2016 2018 FIFA World Cup qualification	Latvia	0–2	Faroe Islands	Riga, Latvia
20:45 (21:45 UTC+3)		Report (FIFA); Report (UEFA)	Nattestad 19'; Edmundsson 70'	Stadium: Skonto Stadium; Attendance: 4,823; Referee: Serhiy Boyko (Ukraine)

10 October 2016 2018 FIFA World Cup qualification	Latvia	0–2	Hungary	Riga, Latvia
20:45 (21:45 UTC+3)		Report (FIFA); Report (UEFA)	Gyurcsó 10'; Szalai 77'	Stadium: Skonto Stadium; Attendance: 4,715; Referee: Paweł Gil (Poland)

13 November 2016 2018 FIFA World Cup qualification	Portugal	4–1	Latvia	Faro/Loulé, Portugal
20:45 (19:45 UTC±0)	Ronaldo 28' (pen.), 85'; Carvalho 70'; Alves 90+2'	Report (FIFA); Report (UEFA)	Zjuzins 67'	Stadium: Estádio Algarve; Attendance: 20,744; Referee: Bobby Madden (Scotland)

=== 2017 ===
25 March 2017 2018 FIFA World Cup qualification	Switzerland	1–0	Latvia	Geneva, Switzerland
18:00 (18:00 UTC+1)	Drmić 66'	Report (FIFA); Report (UEFA)		Stadium: Stade de Genève; Attendance: 25,000; Referee: Vladislav Bezborodov (Russia)

28 March 2017 Friendly	Georgia	5–0	Latvia	Tbilisi, Georgia
18:00 UTC+4	Ananidze 18' (pen.), 77'; Kvilitaia 32', 68'; Arabidze 90'	Report		Stadium: Boris Paichadze Dinamo Arena; Attendance: 14,000; Referee: Suren Baliyan (Armenia)

9 June 2017 2018 FIFA World Cup qualification	Latvia	0–3	Portugal	Riga, Latvia
20:45 (21:45 UTC+3)		Report (FIFA); Report (UEFA)	Ronaldo 41', 63'; A. Silva 67'	Stadium: Skonto Stadium; Attendance: 8,087; Referee: István Kovács (Romania)

12 June 2017 Friendly	Latvia	1–2	Estonia	Riga, Latvia
19:45 (UTC+3)	Ikaunieks 22'	Report	Zenjov 51'; Purje 77'	Stadium: Skonto Stadium; Attendance: 3,157; Referee: Kirill Levnikov (Russia)

31 August 2017 2018 FIFA World Cup qualification	Hungary	3–1	Latvia	Budapest, Hungary
20:45 (20:45 UTC+2)	Kádár 6'; Szalai 26'; Dzsudzsák 68'	Report (FIFA); Report (UEFA)	Freimanis 40'	Stadium: Groupama Arena; Attendance: 16,500; Referee: Yevhen Aranovsky (Ukraine)

3 September 2017 2018 FIFA World Cup qualification	Latvia	0–3	Switzerland	Riga, Latvia
20:45 (21:45 UTC+3)		Report (FIFA); Report (UEFA)	Seferovic 9'; Džemaili 54'; Rodríguez 58' (pen.)	Stadium: Skonto Stadium; Attendance: 7,587; Referee: Serdar Gözübüyük (Netherlands)

7 October 2017 2018 FIFA World Cup qualification	Faroe Islands	0–0	Latvia	Tórshavn, Faroe Islands
18:00 (17:00 UTC+1)		Report (FIFA); Report (UEFA)		Stadium: Tórsvøllur; Attendance: 4,203; Referee: Robert Schörgenhofer (Austria)

10 October 2017 2018 FIFA World Cup qualification	Latvia	4–0	Andorra	Riga, Latvia
20:45 (21:45 UTC+3)	Ikaunieks 11'; Šabala 19', 59'; Tarasovs 63'	Report (FIFA); Report (UEFA)		Stadium: Skonto Stadium; Attendance: 4,153; Referee: Mads-Kristoffer Kristoffersen (Denmark)

7 November 2017 Friendly	Latvia	0–2	Saudi Arabia	Lisbon, Portugal
17:00 UTC+0		Report	Al-Zaqaan 38'; Fallatah 44'	Stadium: Estádio Nacional; Attendance: 25; Referee: Hugo Miguel (Portugal)

13 November 2017 Friendly	Kosovo	4–3	Latvia	Mitrovica, Kosovo
19:30 (UTC+1)	Rrahmani 13'; Muriqi 45'; Rashani 86'; Halimi 90+4'	Report	Kļuškins 11'; Ikaunieks 31'; Siņeļņikovs 59'	Stadium: Adem Jashari Olympic Stadium; Attendance: 5,116; Referee: Enea Jorgji (Albania)

=== 2018 ===
3 February 2018 Friendly	South Korea	1–0	Latvia	Antalya, Turkey
17:30 UTC+3	Kim Shin-wook 33'	Report		Stadium: Mardan Sports Complex; Attendance: 100; Referee: Ali Palabıyık (Turkey)

22 March 2018 Friendly	Faroe Islands	1–1	Latvia	Marbella, Spain
	Gregersen 27'	Report	Fjodorovs 69'	Stadium: Estadio Municipal de Marbella; Attendance: 152; Referee: Ola Hobber Nilsen (Norway)

25 March 2018 Friendly	Gibraltar	1–0	Latvia	Gibraltar
16:00 CEST	Walker 88'	Report		Stadium: Victoria Stadium; Attendance: 1,306; Referee: Trustin Farrufia Cann (Malta)

2 June 2018 2018 Baltic Cup	Latvia	1–0	Estonia	Riga, Latvia
18:00 (UTC+3)	Ikaunieks 70'	Report		Stadium: Daugava Stadium; Attendance: 4,251; Referee: Manfredas Lukjančukas (Lithuania)

5 June 2018 2018 Baltic Cup	Lithuania	1–1	Latvia	Vilnius, Lithuania
19:00 (UTC+3)	Laukžemis 86'	Report	Dubra 46'	Stadium: LFF Stadium; Attendance: 1,000; Referee: Kristo Tohver (Estonia)

9 June 2018 Friendly	Latvia	1–3	Azerbaijan	Rīga, Latvia
19:00 AZT (UTC+4)	Uldriķis 90+4'	Report	Medvedev 20'; Imamverdiyev 57'; Mahmudov 63'	Stadium: Daugava Stadium; Attendance: 3,590; Referee: Denis Scherbakov (Belarus)

6 September 2018 2018–19 Nations League	Latvia	0–0	Andorra	Riga, Latvia
20:45 (21:45 UTC+3)		Report		Stadium: Daugava Stadium; Attendance: 4,803; Referee: Keith Kennedy (Northern Ireland)

9 September 2018 2018–19 Nations League	Georgia	1–0	Latvia	Tbilisi, Georgia
18:00 (20:00 UTC+4)	Okriashvili 77' (pen.)	Report		Stadium: Boris Paichadze Dinamo Arena; Attendance: 45,716; Referee: Anastasios Papapetrou (Greece)

13 October 2018 2018–19 Nations League	Latvia	1–1	Kazakhstan	Riga, Latvia
18:00 (19:00 UTC+3)	Karašausks 40'	Report	Zaynutdinov 16'	Stadium: Daugava Stadium; Attendance: 4,878; Referee: Harald Lechner (Austria)

16 October 2018 2018–19 Nations League	Latvia	0–3	Georgia	Riga, Latvia
20:45 (21:45 UTC+3)		Report	Kankava 8'; Gvilia 29'; Chakvetadze 61'	Stadium: Daugava Stadium; Attendance: 3,185; Referee: Petr Ardeleánu (Czech Republic)

15 November 2018 2018–19 Nations League	Kazakhstan	1–1	Latvia	Astana, Kazakhstan
16:00 (21:00 UTC+6)	Suyumbayev 37'	Report	Rakels 49'	Stadium: Astana Arena; Attendance: 21,463; Referee: Jens Maae (Denmark)

19 November 2018 2018–19 Nations League	Andorra	0–0	Latvia	Andorra la Vella, Andorra
18:00		Report		Stadium: Estadi Nacional, Attendance: 1,021; Referee: Halil Umut Meler (Turkey)

=== 2019 ===
21 March 2019 UEFA Euro 2020 qualifying	North Macedonia	3–1	Latvia	Skopje, North Macedonia
20:45	Alioski 11'; Elmas 29', 90+3'	Report	Velkovski 87' (o.g.)	Stadium: Philip II Arena; Attendance: 7,043; Referee: Halis Özkahya (Turkey)

24 March 2019 UEFA Euro 2020 qualifying	Poland	2–0	Latvia	Warsaw, Poland
20:45	Lewandowski 76'; Glik 84'	Report		Stadium: National Stadium; Attendance: 51,112; Referee: Aliyar Aghayev (Azerbaijan)

7 June 2019 UEFA Euro 2020 qualifying	Latvia	0–3	Israel	Riga, Latvia
20:45 (21:45 UTC+3)		Report	Zahavi 10', 60', 81'	Stadium: Daugava Stadium; Attendance: 5,508; Referee: Sergey Ivanov (Russia)

10 June 2019 UEFA Euro 2020 qualifying	Latvia	0–5	Slovenia	Riga, Latvia
20:45 (21:45 UTC+3)		Report	Črnigoj 24', 27'; Iličić 29' (pen.), 44'; Zajc 47'	Stadium: Daugava Stadium; Attendance: 4,011; Referee: Kevin Clancy (Scotland)

6 September 2019 UEFA Euro 2020 qualifying	Austria	6–0	Latvia	Wals-Siezenheim, Austria
20:45	Arnautović 7', 53' (pen.); Sabitzer 13'; Šteinbors 76' (o.g.); Laimer 80'; Gregoritsch 85'	Report		Stadium: Stadion Wals-Siezenheim; Attendance: 16,300; Referee: Robert Hennessy (Republic of Ireland)

9 September 2019 UEFA Euro 2020 qualifying	Latvia	0–2	North Macedonia	Riga, Latvia
20:45		Report	Pandev 14'; Bardhi 17'	Stadium: Daugava Stadium; Attendance: 2,724; Referee: Espen Eskås (Norway)

10 October 2019 UEFA Euro 2020 qualifying	Latvia	0–3	Poland	Riga, Latvia
20:45 (21:45 UTC+3)		Report	Lewandowski 9', 13', 76'	Stadium: Daugava Stadium; Attendance: 7,107; Referee: Halis Özkahya (Turkey)

15 October 2019 UEFA Euro 2020 qualifying	Israel	3–1	Latvia	Be'er Sheva, Israel
20:45 (21:45 UTC+3)	Dabbur 16', 42'; Zahavi 26'	Report	Kamešs 40'	Stadium: Turner Stadium; Attendance: 9,150; Referee: Arnold Hunter (Northern Ireland)

16 November 2019 UEFA Euro 2020 qualifying	Slovenia	1–0	Latvia	Ljubljana, Slovenia
18:00	Tarasovs 53' (o.g.)	Report		Stadium: Stožice Stadium; Attendance: 11,224; Referee: Radu Petrescu (Romania)

19 November 2019 UEFA Euro 2020 qualifying	Latvia	1–0	Austria	Riga, Latvia
20:45	Ošs 65'	Report		Stadium: Daugava Stadium; Attendance: 2,781; Referee: Alejandro Hernández Hernández (Spain)
