= 1994 Baltic Cup =

International football competition

Tournament details
- Host country: Lithuania
- Dates: 29 July – 31 July
- Teams: 3
- Venue(s): 1 (in 1 host city)

Final positions
- Champions: Lithuania (5th title)
- Runners-up: Latvia
- Third place: Estonia

Tournament statistics
- Matches played: 3
- Goals scored: 6 (2 per match)
- Top scorer(s): (Lithuania) Valdas Ivanauskas (2 goals)

The 1994 Baltic Cup football competition took place from 29–31 July 1994 at the Žalgiris Stadium in Vilnius, Lithuania. It was the fourth annual competition of the three Baltic states; Latvia, Lithuania and Estonia; since they regained their independence from the Soviet Union in 1991.

== Results ==
=== Lithuania vs Estonia ===
29 July 1994

Lithuania	3–0	Estonia
Ivanauskas 11' (pen.), 23'; Mikalajūnas 61'

Žalgiris Stadium, Vilnius
Attendance: 1,000
Referee: Roman Lajuks (Latvia)

Lithuania
GK	Gintaras Staučė
DF	Tomas Žiukas		(substituted off) 67'
DF	Andrėjus Tereškinas
DF	Nerijus Gudaitis
DF	Virginijus Baltušnikas		(substituted off) 58'
MF	Rolandas Vaineikis		(substituted off) 53'
MF	Vytautas Apanavičius		(substituted off) 56'
MF	Arvydas Korsakovas
MF	Irmantas Stumbrys		(substituted off) 64'
FW	Valdas Ivanauskas
FW	Aurelijus Skarbalius
Substitutions:
FW	Andrius Zuta		(substituted in) 53'
MF	Saulius Mikalajūnas	Booked	(substituted in) 56'
DF	Ramūnas Stonkus		(substituted in) 58'
FW	Robertas Zalys		(substituted in) 64'
MF	Igoris Pankratjevas	Booked	(substituted in) 67'
Manager:
(Lithuania) Algimantas Liubinskas

Estonia
GK	Toomas Tohver		(substituted off) 46'
DF	Gert Olesk
DF	Tarmo Linnumäe	(red card) 45'
DF	Toomas Kallaste
DF	Risto Kallaste
MF	Tarmo Saks		(substituted off) 56'
MF	Dzintar Klavan	Booked	(substituted off) 69'
MF	Martin Reim
MF	Meelis Lindmaa	Booked
FW	Marko Kristal	Booked	(substituted off) 69'
FW	Mati Pari	Booked	(substituted off) 46'
Substitutions:
GK	Mart Poom		(substituted in) 46'
FW	Sergei Ratnikov		(substituted in) 46'
MF	Ivan O'Konnel-Bronin		(substituted in) 56'
FW	Marko Lelov		(substituted in) 69'
MF	Marek Lemsalu		(substituted in) 69'
Manager:
(Estonia) Roman Ubakivi

=== Estonia vs Latvia ===
30 July 1994

Estonia	0–2	Latvia
		Astafjevs 31'; Bulders 37'

Žalgiris Stadium, Vilnius
Attendance: 250
Referee: Algirdas Dubinskas (Lithuania)

Estonia
GK	Mart Poom
DF	Gert Olesk
DF	Marek Lemsalu
DF	Toomas Kallaste
DF	Risto Kallaste
MF	Meelis Lindmaa
MF	Dzintar Klavan
MF	Martin Reim
MF	Ivan O'Konnel-Bronin	(substituted off) 29'
FW	Marko Kristal
FW	Mati Pari	(substituted off) 58'
Substitutions:
FW	Tarmo Saks	(substituted in) 29'
FW	Sergei Ratnikov	(substituted in) 58'
Manager:
(Estonia) Roman Ubakivi

Latvia
GK	Oļegs Karavajevs	(substituted off) 67'
DF	Igors Troickis
DF	Mihails Zemļinskis
DF	Gatis Erglis
DF	Jurijs Popkovs	(substituted off) 67'
MF	Sergejs Jemeljanovs	(substituted off) 46'
MF	Vitālijs Astafjevs
MF	Armands Zeiberliņš	(substituted off) 46'
MF	Vadims Mikuckis
FW	Aleksejs Sarando	(substituted off) 62'
FW	Rolands Bulders
Substitutions:
MF	Aleksandrs Fedotovs	(substituted in) 46'
DF	Oļegs Blagonadeždins	(substituted in) 46'
MF	Lars Rihters	(substituted in) 62'
GK	Raimonds Laizāns	(substituted in) 67'
DF	Boris Monjaks	(substituted in) 67'
Manager:
(Latvia) Jānis Gilis

=== Lithuania vs Latvia ===
31 July 1994

Lithuania	1–0	Latvia
Tereškinas 67' (pen.)

Žalgiris Stadium, Vilnius
Attendance: 1,000
Referee: Oleg Timofejev (Estonia)

Lithuania
GK	Gintaras Staučė
DF	Tomas Žiukas
DF	Andrėjus Tereškinas	Booked
DF	Nerijus Gudaitis
DF	Ramūnas Stonkus
MF	Rolandas Vaineikis
MF	Saulius Mikalajūnas		(substituted off) 46'
MF	Arvydas Korsakovas		(substituted off) 59'
MF	Irmantas Stumbrys		(substituted off) 56'
FW	Robertas Zalys		(substituted off) 86'
FW	Aurelijus Skarbalius
Substitutions:
MF	Vytautas Apanavičius		(substituted in) 46'
FW	Andrius Zuta		(substituted in) 56'
FW	Raimundas Vainoras		(substituted in) 59'
FW	Aleksandras Darincevas		(substituted in) 86'
Manager:
(Lithuania) Algimantas Liubinskas

Latvia
GK	Oļegs Karavajevs		(substituted off) 67'
DF	Igors Troickis
DF	Mihails Zemļinskis
DF	Gatis Erglis
DF	Aleksandrs Jelisejevs		(substituted off) 46'
MF	Sergejs Jemeljanovs	Booked
MF	Vitālijs Astafjevs		(substituted off) 78'
MF	Armands Zeiberliņš		(substituted off) 46'
MF	Vadims Mikuckis		(substituted off) 67'
FW	Aleksejs Sarando	Booked
FW	Rolands Bulders
Substitutions:
DF	Jurijs Popkovs		(substituted in) 46'
MF	Lars Rihters		(substituted in) 78'
DF	Oļegs Blagonadeždins	Booked	(substituted in) 46'
DF	Boris Monjaks		(substituted in) 67'
Manager:
(Latvia) Jānis Gilis

== Final table ==
Team	Pld	W	D	L	GF	GA	GD	Pts
Lithuania	2	2	0	0	4	0	+4	4
Latvia	2	1	0	1	2	1	+1	2
Estonia	2	0	0	2	0	5	−5	0

== Winners ==
1994 Baltic Football Cup winners

Lithuania
Fifth title

== Statistics ==
=== Goalscorers ===
There were 6 goals scored in 3 matches, for an average of 2 goals per match.

2 goals

- (Lithuania) Valdas Ivanauskas

1 goal

- (Latvia) Vitālijs Astafjevs
- (Latvia) Rolands Bulders
- (Lithuania) Saulius Mikalajūnas
- (Lithuania) Andrėjus Tereškinas
