= 1993 Baltic Cup =

International football competition

Tournament details
- Host country: Estonia
- Dates: 2 July – 4 July
- Teams: 3
- Venue(s): 1 (in 1 host city)

Final positions
- Champions: Latvia (5th title)
- Runners-up: Estonia
- Third place: Lithuania

Tournament statistics
- Matches played: 3
- Goals scored: 5 (1.67 per match)
- Top scorer(s): Five players (1 goal each)

The 1993 Baltic Cup football competition took place from 2–4 July 1993 at the Kalevi Stadium in Pärnu, Estonia. It was the third annual competition of the three Baltic states; Latvia, Lithuania and Estonia; since they regained their independence from the Soviet Union in 1991.

== Results ==
=== Estonia vs Latvia ===
2 July 1993

Estonia	0–2	Latvia
		Astafjevs 52'; Sarando 80'

Kalevi Stadium, Pärnu
Attendance: 300
Referee: Chelnokov (Estonia)

Estonia
GK	Mart Poom
DF	Viktor Alonen
DF	Urmas Hepner
DF	Toomas Kallaste
DF	Risto Kallaste
MF	Sergei Bragin	Booked
MF	Indro Olumets	(substituted off) 73'
MF	Andrei Borissov
MF	Martin Reim
FW	Marko Kristal
FW	Lembit Rajala	(substituted off) 68'
Substitutions:
FW	Sergei Zamorski	(substituted in) 73'
FW	Dzintar Klavan	(substituted in) 68'
Manager:
(Estonia) Uno Piir

Latvia
GK	Raimonds Laizāns
DF	Igors Troickis
DF	Mihails Zemļinskis
DF	Valērijs Ivanovs
DF	Boris Monjaks	(substituted off) 55'
MF	Aleksandrs Glazovs	(substituted off) 46'
MF	Vitālijs Astafjevs
MF	Armands Zeiberlins	(substituted off) 63'
MF	Aleksandrs Dibrivnijs
FW	Vladimirs Babičevs
FW	Aleksandrs Jelisejevs
Substitutions:
DF	Oļegs Blagonadeždins	(substituted in) 46'
DF	Aleksejs Sarando	(substituted in) 46'
MF	Genādijs Šitiks	(substituted in) 63'
Manager:
(Latvia) Janis Gilis

=== Lithuania vs Latvia ===
3 July 1993

Lithuania	0–0	Latvia

Kalevi Stadium, Pärnu
Attendance: 150
Referee: Chelnokov (Estonia)

Lithuania
GK	Arvydas Skrupskis
DF	Tomas Žiukas
DF	Andrėjus Tereškinas
DF	Albertas Klimavičius
DF	Edgaras Tumasonis
MF	Igoris Kirilovas
MF	Irmantas Stumbrys	(substituted off) 60'
MF	Valdas Urbonas
MF	Vytautas Apanavičius
FW	Ričardas Zdančius	(substituted off) 46'
FW	Vaidotas Šlekys
Substitutions:
FW	Viktoras Olšanskis	(substituted in) 46'
FW	Darius Butkus	(substituted in) 60'
Manager:
(Lithuania) Stasys Stankus

Latvia
GK	Raimonds Laizāns
DF	Igors Troickis
DF	Mihails Zemļinskis
DF	Valērijs Ivanovs
DF	Oļegs Blagonadeždins
MF	Aleksandrs Glazovs
MF	Vitālijs Astafjevs
MF	Armands Zeiberlins
MF	Aleksejs Sarando
FW	Vladimirs Babičevs
FW	Aleksandrs Jelisejevs	(substituted off) 60'
Substitutions:
MF	Genādijs Šitiks	(substituted in) 60'
Manager:
(Latvia) Janis Gilis

=== Estonia vs Lithuania ===
4 July 1993

Estonia	2–1	Lithuania
Zamorski 25'; Bragin 39'		Olšanskis 60'

Kalevi Stadium, Pärnu
Attendance: 800
Referee: Roman Lajuks (Latvia)

Estonia
GK	Mart Poom
DF	Viktor Alonen
DF	Urmas Hepner
DF	Toomas Kallaste
DF	Risto Kallaste
MF	Sergei Zamorski
MF	Sergei Bragin
MF	Andrei Borissov
MF	Martin Reim	(substituted off) 88'
FW	Lembit Rajala
FW	Dzintar Klavan	(substituted off) 79'
Substitutions:
FW	Indro Olumets	(substituted in) 79'
FW	Sergei Ratnikov	(substituted in) 88'
Manager:
(Estonia) Uno Piir

Lithuania
GK	Arvydas Skrupskis
DF	Tomas Žiukas
DF	Andrėjus Tereškinas
DF	Albertas Klimavičius
DF	Edgaras Tumasonis
MF	Vytautas Apanavičius	(substituted off) 28'
MF	Ričardas Zdančius
MF	Viktoras Olšanskis
MF	Valdas Urbonas
FW	Igoris Kirilovas	(substituted off) 55'
FW	Vaidotas Šlekys
Substitutions:
DF	Gyrius Kalvaitis	(substituted in) 28'
FW	Darius Butkus	(substituted in) 55'
Manager:
(Lithuania) Stasys Stankus

== Final table ==
Team	Pld	W	D	L	GF	GA	GD	Pts
Latvia	2	1	1	0	2	0	+2	3
Estonia	2	1	0	1	2	3	−1	2
Lithuania	2	0	1	1	1	2	−1	1

== Winners ==
1993 Baltic Football Cup winners

Latvia
Fifth title

== Statistics ==
=== Goalscorers ===
There were 5 goals scored in 3 matches, for an average of 1.67 goals per match.

1 goal

- (Estonia) Sergei Zamorski
- (Estonia) Sergei Bragin
- (Latvia) Vitālijs Astafjevs
- (Latvia) Aleksejs Sarando
- (Lithuania) Viktoras Olšanskis
