= Klavan =

Family name

Klavan is an Estonian surname. Notable people with the surname include:

- Andrew Klavan (born 1954), American author and screenwriter
- Dzintar Klavan (born 1961), Estonian footballer
- Gene Klavan (1924–2004), American DJ, columnist and author
- Ragnar Klavan (born 1985), Estonian footballer
