= Lithuanian Footballer of the Year =

Lithuanian Footballer of the Year is a football award.

== Winners ==
- 1965: Petras Glodenis ( (Lithuanian Soviet Socialist Republic) Žalgiris Vilnius)
- 1966: Gintautas Kalėdinskas ( (Lithuanian Soviet Socialist Republic) Žalgiris Vilnius)
- 1967: Stanislovas Ramelis ( (Lithuanian Soviet Socialist Republic) Žalgiris Vilnius)
- 1968: Stanislovas Ramelis ( (Lithuanian Soviet Socialist Republic) Žalgiris Vilnius)
- 1969: Juzefas Jurgelevičius ( (Lithuanian Soviet Socialist Republic) Žalgiris Vilnius)
- 1970: Romualdas Juška ( (Lithuanian Soviet Socialist Republic) Žalgiris Vilnius)
- 1971: Benjaminas Zelkevičius ( (Lithuanian Soviet Socialist Republic) Žalgiris Vilnius)
- 1972: Benjaminas Zelkevičius ( (Lithuanian Soviet Socialist Republic) Žalgiris Vilnius)
- 1973: Petras Glodenis ( (Lithuanian Soviet Socialist Republic) Žalgiris Vilnius)
- 1974: Algirdas Žilinskas ( (Lithuanian Soviet Socialist Republic) Žalgiris Vilnius)
- 1975: Vytautas Dirmeikis ( (Lithuanian Soviet Socialist Republic) Žalgiris Vilnius)
- 1976: Eugenijus Riabovas ( (Lithuanian Soviet Socialist Republic) Žalgiris Vilnius)
- 1977: Eugenijus Riabovas ( (Lithuanian Soviet Socialist Republic) Žalgiris Vilnius)
- 1978: Eugenijus Riabovas ( (Lithuanian Soviet Socialist Republic) Žalgiris Vilnius)
- 1979: Stanislovas Danisevičius ( (Lithuanian Soviet Socialist Republic) Žalgiris Vilnius)
- 1980: Juzefas Jurgelevičius ( (Lithuanian Soviet Socialist Republic) Žalgiris Vilnius)
- 1981: Vytautas Dirmeikis ( (Lithuanian Soviet Socialist Republic) Žalgiris Vilnius)
- 1982: Sigitas Jakubauskas ( (Lithuanian Soviet Socialist Republic) Žalgiris Vilnius)
- 1983: Valdas Kasparavičius ( (Lithuanian Soviet Socialist Republic) Žalgiris Vilnius)
- 1984: Stanislovas Danisevičius ( (Lithuanian Soviet Socialist Republic) Žalgiris Vilnius)
- 1985: Arminas Narbekovas ( (Lithuanian Soviet Socialist Republic) Žalgiris Vilnius)
- 1986: Arminas Narbekovas ( (Lithuanian Soviet Socialist Republic) Žalgiris Vilnius)
- 1987: Arminas Narbekovas ( (Lithuanian Soviet Socialist Republic) Žalgiris Vilnius)
- 1988: Arminas Narbekovas ( (Lithuanian Soviet Socialist Republic) Žalgiris Vilnius)
- 1989: Valdemaras Martinkėnas ( (Lithuanian Soviet Socialist Republic) Žalgiris Vilnius)
- 1990: Valdas Ivanauskas ( Austria Wien)
- 1991: Valdas Ivanauskas ( Austria Wien)
- 1992: Valdemaras Martinkėnas ( (Ukraine) Dynamo Kyiv)
- 1993: Valdas Ivanauskas ( (Germany) Hamburger SV)
- 1994: Valdas Ivanauskas ( (Germany) Hamburger SV)
- 1995: Gintaras Staučė ( (Turkey) Karşıyaka SK)
- 1996: Gintaras Staučė ( (Turkey) Sarıyer GK)
- 1997: Edgaras Jankauskas ( (Belgium) Club Brugge)
- 1998: Edgaras Jankauskas ( (Belgium) Club Brugge)
- 1999: Saulius Mikalajūnas ( (Russia) Uralan Elista)
- 2000: Edgaras Jankauskas ( (Spain) Real Sociedad)
- 2001: Edgaras Jankauskas ( (Spain) Real Sociedad)
- 2002: Raimondas Žutautas ( (Israel) Maccabi Haifa FC)
- 2003: Robertas Poškus ( (Russia) Krylya Sovetov Samara)
- 2004: Edgaras Jankauskas ( (France) OGC Nice)
- 2005: Deividas Šemberas ( (Russia) PFC CSKA Moscow)
- 2006: Tomas Danilevičius ( (Italy) AS Livorno Calcio)
- 2007: Tomas Danilevičius ( (Italy) Bologna FC 1909)
- 2008: Marius Stankevičius ( (Italy) UC Sampdoria)
- 2009: Marius Stankevičius ( (Italy) UC Sampdoria)
- 2010: Darvydas Šernas ( (Poland) Widzew Łódź)
- 2011: Žydrūnas Karčemarskas ( (Turkey) Gaziantepspor)
- 2012: Žydrūnas Karčemarskas ( (Turkey) Gaziantepspor)
- 2013: Mindaugas Kalonas ( (Azerbaijan) Baku FC)
- 2014: Giedrius Arlauskis ( (Romania) Steaua București)
- 2015: Lukas Spalvis ( (Denmark) Aalborg BK)
- 2016: Fiodor Černych ( (Poland) Jagiellonia Białystok)
- 2017: Fiodor Černych ( (Poland) Jagiellonia Białystok)
- 2018: Arvydas Novikovas ( (Poland) Jagiellonia Białystok)
- 2019: Ernestas Šetkus ( (Israel) Hapoel Be'er Sheva)
- 2020: Arvydas Novikovas ( (Poland) Legia Warsaw & (Turkey) BB Erzurumspor)
- 2021: Arvydas Novikovas ( (Turkey) BB Erzurumspor)
- 2022: Edvinas Gertmonas ( (Lithuania) Žalgiris Vilnius)
- 2023: Justas Lasickas ( (Slovenia) Olimpija Ljubljana)
- 2024: Gvidas Gineitis ( (Italy) Torino)
- 2025: Gvidas Gineitis ( (Italy) Torino)

== See also ==
- Lithuanian Basketball Player of the Year
