= Juzefas Jurgelevičius =

Lithuanian footballer (1947–2009)

Personal information
- Date of birth: 15 April 1947
- Place of birth: Vilnius, Lithuanian SSR
- Date of death: 23 November 2009 (aged 62)
- Place of death: Vilnius, Lithuania
- Position: Midfielder

Senior career*
Years	Team	Apps	(Gls)
1967–1970	Žalgiris Vilnius	141	(26)
1971–1972	Dinamo Minsk	52	(2)
1973–1980	Žalgiris Vilnius	283	(36)
1981–1983	FK Aušra Vilnius		

Managerial career
- 1990–1991: Polonia Vilnius
- * Club domestic league appearances and goals

Juzefas Jurgelevičius (Polish: Józef Jurgielewicz; 1947 – 23 November 2009) was a footballer from Lithuania who played as a midfielder.

Jurgelevičius was elected Lithuanian Footballer of the Year in 1969 and 1980.
