= Darius Butkus =

Lithuanian footballer

Personal information
- Full name: Darius Butkus
- Date of birth: 11 November 1972 (age 53)
- Place of birth: Kretinga, Lithuanian SSR, Soviet Union
- Height: 1.74 m (5 ft 9 in)
- Position: Defender

Senior career*
Years	Team	Apps	(Gls)
1991–1999	FK Ekranas	127	(0)
1999–2001	FK Nevėžis	91	(3)

International career^{‡}
1993	Lithuania	2	(0)

Managerial career
- 2007–2008: FK Ekranas
- * Club domestic league appearances and goals as of 10:24, 21 May 2016 (UTC) ‡ National team caps and goals as of 10:24, 21 May 2016 (UTC)

Darius Butkus (born November 11, 1972) is a Lithuanian former international footballer who played for FK Ekranas and FK Nevėžis, as a defender.

== International career ==
Butkus played two matches for Lithuania at the 1993 Baltic Cup. He had previously played against Finland and Latvia at an indoor Baltic Cup in February 1993. The Lithuanian Football Federation did not consider the matches to be official international games, but Lithuania's opponents and world governing body FIFA did.

=== International statistics ===
As of 21 May 2016

Lithuania
Year	Apps	Goals
1993	2	0
Total	2	0
