= Sergei Zamorski =

Estonian-Russian footballer

Personal information
- Full name: Sergei Zamorski
- Date of birth: 22 January 1971 (age 55)
- Place of birth: Narva, then part of Estonian SSR, Soviet Union
- Height: 1.78 m (5 ft 10 in)
- Position: Midfielder

International career^{‡}
Years	Team	Apps	(Gls)
1993	Estonia	4	(1)
- ‡ National team caps and goals as of 23 May 2009

Sergei Zamorski (born 22 January 1971) is a retired footballer from Estonia who also holds Russian nationality. He retired in 2004. His last club was JK Trans Narva.

== International career ==
Zamorski obtained a total number of four caps for the Estonia national football team in 1993. He scored the first goal on 4 July 1993 when Estonia defeated Lithuania in the Pärnu Kalevi Stadium during the Baltic Cup 1993.
