= Genādijs Šitiks =

Latvian footballer and manager

Personal information
- Full name: Genādijs Šitiks
- Date of birth: 18 June 1958
- Place of birth: Riga, Latvian SSR (Soviet Union)
- Date of death: 20 August 2009 (aged 51)
- Position: Midfielder

Senior career*
Years	Team	Apps	(Gls)
1979–1991	FK Daugava Rīga		(108)

International career
1979	Latvia amateur	6	(0)
1992	Latvia	4	(0)
- * Club domestic league appearances and goals

Genādijs Šitiks (18 June 1958 – 20 August 2009) was a Latvian football manager and a former footballer, one of Latvia's best footballers of the 1980s.

== Playing and coaching career ==
Šitiks learned the basics of football at the Riga football school, but his first serious team was VEF Rīga where he played under Georgijs Smirnovs. In 1978 Šitiks was named the best midfielder of the Latvian league and the 1979 season he started as a player of Daugava Rīga. With Daugava he played until 1991, making more than 400 appearances and scoring 108 goals. His best seasons came in 1981 - 21 goal in 41 matches and 1986 - 18 goals in 43 matches (and he was a midfielder, not a forward). In 1986 Šitiks was the third best scorer in the Soviet First League, together with Aleksandrs Starkovs he was one of the most important players in the 1980s Daugava team. In 1986 Šitiks was invited to training with the Soviet Olympic football team, but Daugava head coach Jānis Skredelis decided not to inform Šitiks about that fact.

When the Soviet Union collapsed Šitiks went first to Sweden, then to Poland but soon he retired from football. Still he played for Latvia national football team in its first four matches. In 1996 Šitiks as a playing coach led FK Vecrīga to victory in the Latvia 1. līga tournament, earning promotion to Virslīga, however because of limited finances the club declined to play in Virslīga and became disfunct.

Šitiks founded a football school in Riga, Šitika FS, and devoted his life to coaching young football talents. He was also appointed the head coach of Latvia national under-21 football team.

== Death ==
On 20 August 2009, Latvian Football Federation reported that Šitiks had died of unknown causes.

== Honours ==
- Baltic Cup
  - 1993
