= Tarmo Saks =

Estonian footballer

Personal information
- Full name: Tarmo Saks
- Date of birth: 6 November 1975 (age 50)
- Place of birth: Tallinn, then part of Estonian SSR, Soviet Union
- Position: Forward

International career^{‡}
Years	Team	Apps	(Gls)
1994–1998	Estonia	5	(0)
- ‡ National team caps and goals as of 23 May 2009

Tarmo Saks (born 6 November 1975) is a retired football forward from Estonia. He played for several clubs in his native country, including FC Kuressaare and FC Flora Tallinn.

== International career ==
Saks earned his first official cap for the Estonia national football team on 29 July 1994, when Estonia played Lithuania at the Baltic Cup 1994. He obtained a total number of five caps.
