= Aleksandrs Glazovs =

Latvian footballer

Personal information
- Full name: Aleksandrs Glazovs
- Date of birth: 30 April 1970 (age 56)
- Place of birth: USSR
- Height: 1.66 m (5 ft 5 1/2 in)
- Position: Midfielder

Senior career*
Years	Team	Apps	(Gls)
1999	Nasaf	10	(1)

International career
1992–1994	Latvia	15	(0)
- * Club domestic league appearances and goals

Aleksandrs Glazovs (born 30 April 1970) is a former football midfielder from Latvia. He obtained a total number of 15 caps for the Latvia national team between 1992 and 1994, scoring no goal. His last club was Policija Riga, where he retired in 1999.

== Honours ==
- Baltic Cup
  - 1993
