= 1995 Baltic Cup =

International football competition

Tournament details
- Host country: Latvia
- Dates: 19 May – 21 May
- Teams: 3
- Venue: 1 (in 1 host city)

Final positions
- Champions: Latvia (6th title)
- Runners-up: Lithuania
- Third place: Estonia

Tournament statistics
- Matches played: 3
- Goals scored: 11 (3.67 per match)
- Attendance: 3,300 (1,100 per match)
- Top scorer(s): Eleven players (1 goal each)

The 1995 Baltic Cup football competition was the 15th season of the Baltic Cup and took place from 19 to 21 May 1995 at the Daugava Stadium in Riga, Latvia. It was the fifth annual competition of the three Baltic states – Latvia, Lithuania and Estonia – since they regained their independence from the Soviet Union in 1991.

== Results ==
=== Latvia vs Estonia ===
19 May 1995

Latvia	2–0	Estonia
Zeiberliņš 37'; Ivanovs 67'

Daugava Stadium, Riga
Attendance: 300
Referee: Sergejus Sliva (Lithuania)

=== Lithuania vs Estonia ===
20 May 1995

Lithuania	7–0	Estonia
Skarbalius 27'; Baltušnikas 34'; Preikšaitis 36'; Upstas 57'; Zuta 62'; Žvingilas 75'; Poderis 88'

Daugava Stadium, Riga
Attendance: 1,500
Referee: Roman Lajuks (Latvia)

=== Latvia vs Lithuania ===
21 May 1995

Latvia	2–0	Lithuania
Zemļinskis 34' (pen.); Astafjevs 75'

Daugava Stadium, Riga
Attendance: 1,500
Referee: Oleg Timofejev (Estonia)

== Final table ==
Team	Pld	W	D	L	GF	GA	GD	Pts
Latvia	2	2	0	0	4	0	+4	6
Lithuania	2	1	0	1	7	2	+5	3
Estonia	2	0	0	2	0	9	−9	0

== Winners ==
1995 Baltic Football Cup winners

Latvia
Sixth title

== Statistics ==
=== Goalscorers ===
There were 11 goals scored in 3 matches, for an average of 3.67 goals per match.

1 goal

- (Latvia) Armands Zeiberliņš
- (Latvia) Mihails Zemļinskis
- (Latvia) Valērijs Ivanovs
- (Latvia) Vitālijs Astafjevs
- (Lithuania) Aidas Preikšaitis
- (Lithuania) Aurelijus Skarbalius
- (Lithuania) Andrius Upstas
- (Lithuania) Andrius Zuta
- (Lithuania) Eimantas Poderis
- (Lithuania) Rimantas Žvingilas
- (Lithuania) Virginijus Baltušnikas
