= Gintaras Staučė =

Lithuanian footballer and coach

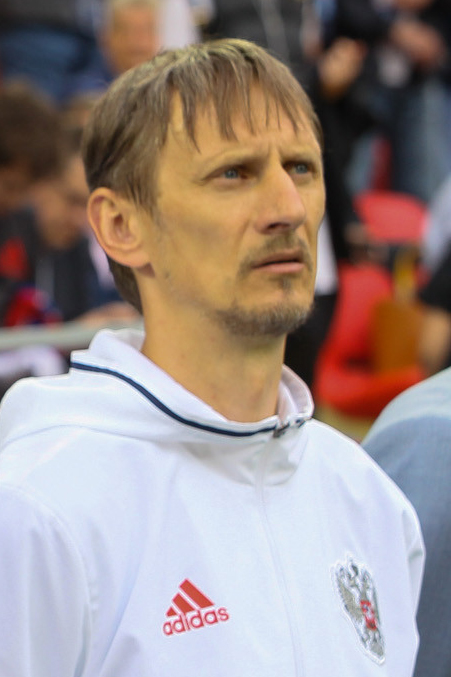
- Staučė coaching Russia in 2017

Personal information
- Date of birth: 24 December 1969 (age 56)
- Place of birth: Alytus, Lithuanian SSR, Soviet Union
- Height: 1.87 m (6 ft 2 in)
- Position: Goalkeeper

Team information
- Current team: Tobol (goalkeeping coach)

Youth career
- –1987: FK Žalgiris

Senior career*
Years	Team	Apps	(Gls)
1988–1994	Spartak Moscow	32	(0)
1994–1995	Galatasaray	27	(0)
1995–1996	→ Karşıyaka (loan)	34	(0)
1996–1997	Sarıyer	26	(0)
1997–2001	MSV Duisburg	73	(0)
2001–2002	Akratitos	16	(0)
2002–2003	Fostiras	24	(0)
2003–2004	Kallithea	13	(0)
2004–2006	Jūrmala	51	(0)
Total		297	(0)

International career
1992–2004	Lithuania	61	(0)
- * Club domestic league appearances and goals

Gintaras Staučė (born 24 December 1969) is a Lithuanian football coach and former player who is the goalkeeping coach of Kazakhstan Premier League club Tobol.

== Club career ==
Among the other teams he played for were Spartak Moscow, Galatasaray in Turkey, and the Bundesliga's MSV Duisburg.

== International career ==
An outstanding goalkeeper, he won 61 caps for the Lithuanian national football team, and is the former record holder for his country.

On 30 August 2004, Staučė announced his international retirement ahead of the start of the 2006 FIFA World Cup qualifying campaign, and was replaced in the Lithuanian team by Žydrūnas Karčemarskas.

== Coaching career ==
Upon retirement, he became part of Stanislav Cherchesov's coaching team as a goalkeeping coach, following Cherchesov with his appointments. At the 2018 FIFA World Cup, Cherchesov coached Russia, who defeated Spain in the Round of 16 in the penalty shoot-out, which Staučė helped to prepare Russia's goalkeeper Igor Akinfeev for, analyzing the penalty taking tendencies of Spain players.

His 15-year cooperation with Cherchesov was suspended when Cherchesov was hired by Russian club Akhmat Grozny in 2025, and Staučė decided not to work in Russia due to the Russo-Ukrainian war.

== Career statistics ==
Appearances and goals by club, season and competition
Club	Season	Division	League	
Club	Season	Division	Apps	Goals
Spartak Moscow	1988	Soviet Top League	0	0
Spartak Moscow	1989	Soviet Top League	0	0
Spartak Moscow	1990	Soviet Top League	0	0
Spartak Moscow	1991	Soviet Top League	0	0
Spartak Moscow	1992	Russian Premier League	3	0
Spartak Moscow	1993	Russian Premier League	13	0
Spartak Moscow	1994	Russian Premier League	16	0
Spartak Moscow	Total		32	0
Galatasaray	1994–95	Süper Lig	27	0
Karşıyaka (loan)	1995–96	Süper Lig	34	0
Sarıyer	1996–97	Süper Lig	26	0
MSV Duisburg	1997–98	Bundesliga	1	0
MSV Duisburg	1998–99	Bundesliga	20	0
MSV Duisburg	1999–2000	Bundesliga	25	0
MSV Duisburg	2000–01	2. Bundesliga	27	0
MSV Duisburg	Total		73	0
Akratitos	2001–02	Super League Greece	16	0
Fostiras	2002–03	Football League (Greece)	24	0
Kallithea	2003–04	Super League Greece	13	0
Jūrmala	2005	Latvian Higher League	24	0

== Honours ==
Spartak Moscow

- Russian Premier League: 1992, 1993, 1994
- Soviet Cup: 1992
- Russian Cup: 1994

Galatasaray

- Turkish Cup runner-up: 1994–95

MSV Duisburg

- German Cup runner-up: 1997–98

Soviet Union U16

- UEFA Euro Under-16 third place: 1986

Soviet Union U18

- UEFA Euro Under-18: 1988

Individual

- Lithuanian Player of the Year: 1995, 1996
