= Ivan O'Konnel-Bronin =

Estonian footballer

Personal information
- Full name: Ivan O'Konnel-Bronin
- Date of birth: 10 February 1973 (age 53)
- Place of birth: Tartu, then part of Estonian SSR, Soviet Union
- Height: 1.81 m (5 ft 11 1/2 in)
- Position: Forward

International career
Years	Team	Apps	(Gls)
1994–1999	Estonia	22	(0)

Ivan O'Konnel-Bronin (born 10 February 1973) is a retired Estonian football forward, who became a football manager after his professional career. He played for several clubs in his native country, including JK Merkuur Tartu, FC Levadia Tallinn, JK Tammeka Tartu, JK Viljandi Tulevik and FC Ajax Lasnamäe.

== International career ==
O'Konnel-Bronin earned his first official cap for the Estonia national football team on 30 July 1994, when Estonia played Latvia at the Baltic Cup 1994. He obtained a total of 22 caps.
