= Valērijs Ivanovs =

Latvian footballer (born 1970)

Personal information
- Full name: Valērijs Ivanovs
- Date of birth: 23 February 1970 (age 56)
- Place of birth: Riga, USSR
- Height: 1.80 m (5 ft 11 in)
- Position: Midfielder

Youth career
- RFSh Riga
- SDYuSShOR Riga

Senior career*
Years	Team	Apps	(Gls)
1988	Latviya-Molodyozhnaya Riga		
1988	RShVSM-RAF Jelgava	40	(1)
1989	FC Zvezda Tallinn		
1989–1993	RAF Jelgava	79	(1)
1993–1994	Helsingborgs IF	10	(0)
1995–1997	Skonto FC	68	(13)
1998	Uralan Elista	29	(0)
1999–2000	Shinnik Yaroslavl	34	(1)
2000–2001	Spartak Varna	5	(0)
2001–2002	Volgar-Gazprom Astrakhan	8	(0)

International career
1992–2001	Latvia	69	(1)
- * Club domestic league appearances and goals

Valērijs Ivanovs (Russian: Валерий Иванович Иванов, romanized: Valery Ivanovich Ivanov; born 23 February 1970 in Riga) is a former football midfielder from Latvia. He played 69 international matches and scored 1 goal for the Latvia national team between 1992 and 2001. His clubs include FC Skonto (1995–1997), Helsingborgs IF, Uralan Elista, Shinnik Yaroslavl and Volgar GazProm Astrakhan.

== Honours ==
RAF Jelgava

- Latvian Higher League runner-up: 1992, 1993
- Latvian Football Cup winner: 1993

Skonto

- Latvian Higher League champion: 1995, 1996, 1997
- Latvian Football Cup winner: 1995, 1997
- Latvian Football Cup runner-up: 1996

Helsingborgs

- Svenska Cupen runner-up: 1993–94

Latvia

- Baltic Cup winner: 1993, 1995
