= Žydrūnas Karčemarskas =

Lithuanian footballer (born 1983)

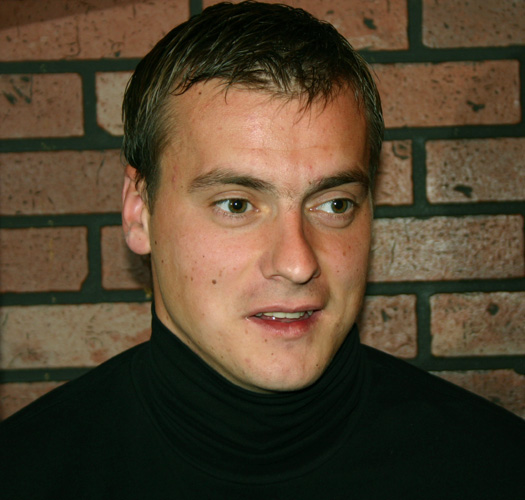
- Karčemarskas in 2006

Personal information
- Date of birth: 24 May 1983 (age 43)
- Place of birth: Alytus, Lithuanian SSR, Soviet Union
- Height: 1.89 m (6 ft 2 in)
- Position: Goalkeeper

Senior career*
Years	Team	Apps	(Gls)
2000	Dainava Alytus	3	(0)
2001	Žalgiris Vilnius	2	(0)
2002–2009	Dynamo Moscow	45	(0)
2010–2016	Gaziantepspor	172	(0)
2016–2019	Osmanlıspor	73	(0)
Total		347	(0)

International career
2003–2013	Lithuania	66	(0)
- * Club domestic league appearances and goals

Žydrūnas Karčemarskas (born 24 May 1983) is a Lithuanian former professional footballer who played as a goalkeeper. Between 2003 and 2013, he earned 66 caps with Lithuania national team.

== Club career ==
Karčemarskas was born in Alytus. He started his career in his home town at Dainava Alytus before moving to Žalgiris Vilnius in 2001. After one year in Vilnius, he joined Dynamo Moscow, where he played until 2009. In January 2010, he joined Süper Lig side Gaziantepspor. He was named Lithuanian Footballer of the Year in 2011 and 2012 by the Lithuanian Football Federation.

In July 2016, Karčemarskas joined Osmanlıspor on a three-year contract. At the end of the 2017–18 season, his team was relegated to the TFF 1. Lig after finishing in 16th place. Karčemarskas played one more season for Osmanlıspor in the second division before retiring from professional football in summer 2019.

== International career ==
Karčemarskas made his debut for the Lithuania national team in February 2003 in a friendly match against Latvia. In 2004, he became the first-choice goalkeeper for the national team, and until 2013, he earned 66 caps for his country.

Karčemarskas has also represented Lithuania at under-21 level.

== Off the pitch ==
After finishing professional's career, Karčemarskas began to play in the live poker tournaments. On 23 October 2022, he won the main event of the Vilnius Open Championship, the largest tournament in Lithuania, for €13,375.
