= Boriss Monjaks =

Latvian footballer

Personal information
- Full name: Boriss Monjaks
- Date of birth: 11 April 1970 (age 56)
- Place of birth: USSR
- Height: 1.83 m (6 ft 0 in)
- Position: Defender

Senior career*
Years	Team	Apps	(Gls)
1988	Jaunatnes izlase Riga		
1988–1989	Zvejnieks Liepāja	39	(1)
1994–1996	Skonto FC	56	(12)
1997	FK Liepājas Metalurgs		
2000–2002	LU/Daugava	68	(0)

International career
1992–1996	Latvia	16	(0)
- * Club domestic league appearances and goals

Boriss Monjaks (born 11 April 1970) is a former football defender from Latvia. He obtained a total number of 16 caps for the Latvia national team between 1992 and 2001, scoring no goal. His last club was Daugava Rīga, where he retired in 2002.

== Honours ==
- Baltic Cup
  - 1993
