= Vadims Mikuckis =

Latvian footballer

Personal information
- Date of birth: 10 June 1971 (age 55)
- Place of birth: Liepāja, Latvia
- Position: Midfielder

Senior career*
| Years | Team | Apps | (Gls) |
| 1991–1992 | FK Gauja | | |
| 1992 | Tevalte Tallinn | | |
| 1993 | RAF Jelgava | | |
| 1994–1995 | Skonto FC | | |
| 1995 | → Skonto-Metāls | | |
| 1996 | Sydney Cosmos | | |
| 1997–1999 | Eastern Suburbs FC | | |
| 1999–2000 | Fraser Park FC | | |
| 2000–2001 | Blacktown City Demons | | |
| 2002–2003 | Rockdale City Suns FC | | |
| 2003–2004 | FK Valmiera | | |

International career
| 1994–1995 | Latvia | 7 | (0) |
- * Club domestic league appearances and goals

Vadims Mikuckis (born 10 June 1971) is a retired Latvian football midfielder.
