= Armands Zeiberliņš =

Latvian footballer and manager

Personal information
- Full name: Armands Zeiberliņš
- Date of birth: 13 August 1965 (age 61)
- Place of birth: Latvian SSR, Soviet Union
- Height: 1.82 m (5 ft 11 1/2 in)
- Position: Midfielder

Team information
- Current team: JDFS Alberts U18 (manager)

Senior career*
Years	Team	Apps	(Gls)
1983	Zvejnieks Liepāja	14	(1)
1984–1987	FC SKA Rostov-on-Don	42	(1)
1987	FC Shinnik Yaroslavl	5	(0)
1988	Zvejnieks Liepāja	16	(2)
1988–1990	FC Torpedo Lutsk	68	(8)
1990	FC Shakhtar Donetsk	3	(0)
1992	FC Mashinostroitel Pskov	6	(0)
1992–1993	RAF Jelgava	7	(2)
1993	Ope IF (Sweden)	14	(4)
1993–1994	KSZO Ostrowiec Świętokrzyski	0	(0)
1994	FC Gute (Sweden)	19	(0)
1995	RAF Jelgava	10	(4)
1995	Hapoel Be'er Sheva	12	(2)
1996	Hapoel Beit She'an	16	(0)
1996	FC Universitate Riga	15	(0)
1997	FK Liepājas Metalurgs	19	(2)
1997–1998	FC Metalurh Zaporizhya	4	(0)
2001–2002	FC Volyn Lutsk	2	(1)

International career^{‡}
1993–1998	Latvia	23	(4)

Managerial career
- 2014–: FK Daugava Rīga
- * Club domestic league appearances and goals as of 2 January 2015 ‡ National team caps and goals as of 2 January 2015

Armands Zeiberliņš (born 13 August 1965) is a Latvian football manager and former international player, currently working as the head coach of FK Daugava Rīga in the Latvian Higher League.

Zeiberliņš played as a midfielder and obtained a total number of 23 caps for the Latvia national football team, scoring 4 goals. His last club was FC Volyn Lutsk in Ukraine. He also played in Sweden, Russia, Poland and Israel during his career. In May 2014 Zeiberliņš was appointed as the manager of FK Daugava Rīga.

== Honours ==
Latvia

- Baltic Cup
  - 1993
  - 1995
