= Saulius Mikalajūnas =

Lithuanian footballer

Personal information
- Full name: Saulius Mikalajūnas
- Date of birth: 6 September 1972 (age 54)
- Place of birth: Klaipėda, Lithuanian SSR, Soviet Union
- Height: 1.72 m (5 ft 8 in)
- Position: Midfielder

Senior career*
| Years | Team | Apps | (Gls) |
| 1988–1990 | FK Atlantas | 25 | (0) |
| 1990–1993 | FK Sirijus Klaipėda | | |
| 1994–1995 | ROMAR Mažeikiai | | |
| 1995–1997 | Kareda Šiauliai | | |
| 1998 | FC Metallurg Lipetsk | 10 | (0) |
| 1998 | FC Rubin Kazan | 21 | (3) |
| 1999–2000 | FC Uralan Elista | 51 | (6) |
| 2001–2002 | FC Torpedo-ZIL Moscow | 38 | (1) |
| 2002–2003 | FK Atlantas | | |

International career
| 1994–2003 | Lithuania | 42 | (1) |
- * Club domestic league appearances and goals

Saulius Mikalajūnas (born 6 September 1972) is a retired Lithuanian international football midfielder. He obtained a total number of 42 caps for the Lithuania national football team, scoring one goal. He also played in Russia during his professional career.

== Honours ==
- Baltic Cup: 1994
- A Lyga Champion: 1997, 1998
