= Risto Kallaste =

Estonian footballer (born 1971)

Personal information
- Full name: Risto Kallaste
- Date of birth: 23 February 1971 (age 55)
- Place of birth: Tallinn, then part of Estonian SSR, Soviet Union
- Position: Full back

Team information
- Current team: Flora U19 (manager)

Senior career*
Years	Team	Apps	(Gls)
1988	Lõvid	?	(?)
1989	Sport	35	(2)
1990–1991	Gunnilse IS	?	(?)
1992–1994	Flora	44	(3)
1995–1996	Viborg	26	(7)
1999–2001	Kuressaare	30	(7)
2006-2008	Nõmme United	23	(9)

International career
1992–1996	Estonia	36	(0)

Managerial career
- 2014–: Flora (assistant manager)
- 2016–: Flora U19
- * Club domestic league appearances and goals

Risto Kallaste (born 23 February 1971) is an Estonian football manager and former Estonian international footballer who is currently the manager of Flora U19 team. He played as a full back. Kallaste made his first appearance for the Estonia national football team on 3 June 1992, in a historic 1–1 friendly draw against Slovenia. The match was Estonia's first official match since restoration of independence and Slovenia's first ever. He made a total of 36 appearances for the national team.

== Style of play ==
Kallaste was famous for his long range flip throw-ins.

== Personal ==
His son Ken Kallaste is also a footballer.
