= Aleksejs Šarando =

Latvian footballer

Personal information
- Full name: Aleksejs Šarando
- Date of birth: 1 January 1964 (age 62)
- Place of birth: USSR
- Height: 1.85 m (6 ft 1 in)
- Position: Midfielder

Team information
- Current team: Skonto FC-2 (assistant manager)

Senior career*
Years	Team	Apps	(Gls)
1987–1988	Zvejnieks Liepāja	62	(15)
1989	FK Daugava Rīga	34	(5)
1990	RAF Jelgava	31	(15)
1991	Pārdaugava Rīga	20	(0)
1993	RAF Jelgava	?	(?)
1993	KPV Kokkola	?	(?)
1994	Gällivare SK	?	(?)
1995–1997	Neftekhimik Nizhnekamsk	33	(2)
1998	FK Daugava Rīga	?	(?)
1999–2001	FK Rīga	?	(?)

International career
1993–1999	Latvia	24	(2)

Managerial career
- 2005: JFK Olimps
- 2006–: Skonto FC (youth coach)
- 2012–: Skonto FC-2 (assistant manager)
- * Club domestic league appearances and goals

Aleksejs Šarando (born 1 January 1964) is a former football midfielder from Latvia, currently the assistant manager of Skonto FC-2 in the Latvian First League. He obtained a total number of 24 caps for the Latvia national team between 1993 and 1999, scoring two goals. His last club was FK Rīga, where he retired in 2001. Šarando also played as a professional in Russia, Finland and Sweden.

== Honours ==
- Baltic Cup
  - 1993
