= Rolands Bulders =

Latvian footballer

Personal information
- Full name: Rolands Bulders
- Date of birth: 12 March 1965 (age 61)
- Place of birth: Liepāja, Latvian SSR, Soviet Union
- Height: 1.96 m (6 ft 5 in)
- Position: Striker

International career^{‡}
Years	Team	Apps	(Gls)
1991–1999	Latvia	33	(3)
- ‡ National team caps and goals as of 23 May 2009

Rolands Bulders (born 12 March 1965 in Liepāja) is a retired Latvian international footballer. He obtained a total number of 33 caps for the Latvia national football team, scoring three goals. His last club was FK Ventspils.
