= Vytautas Apanavičius =

Lithuanian footballer

Personal information
- Date of birth: 12 March 1973 (age 53)
- Place of birth: Lithuanian SSR, Soviet Union
- Height: 1.75 m (5 ft 9 in)
- Position: Midfielder

Senior career*
Years	Team	Apps	(Gls)
1991–1994	FK Ekranas	62	(7)
1994–1997	FBK Kaunas	57	(2)
1997	FC Baltika Kaliningrad	5	(0)
2000	FK Daugava Rīga	10	(0)
2000	FK Nevėžis	13	(0)
2002	FK Atlantas	14	(0)

International career
1992–1995	Lithuania	19	(0)
- * Club domestic league appearances and goals

Vytautas Apanavičius (born 12 March 1973) is a Lithuanian former football midfielder. He played nineteen games for the Lithuania national football team, scoring no goals. Apanavičius also played in Latvia and Russia.

== Honours ==
National Team

- Baltic Cup
  - 1992
