= Mihails Zemļinskis =

Latvian politician and footballer

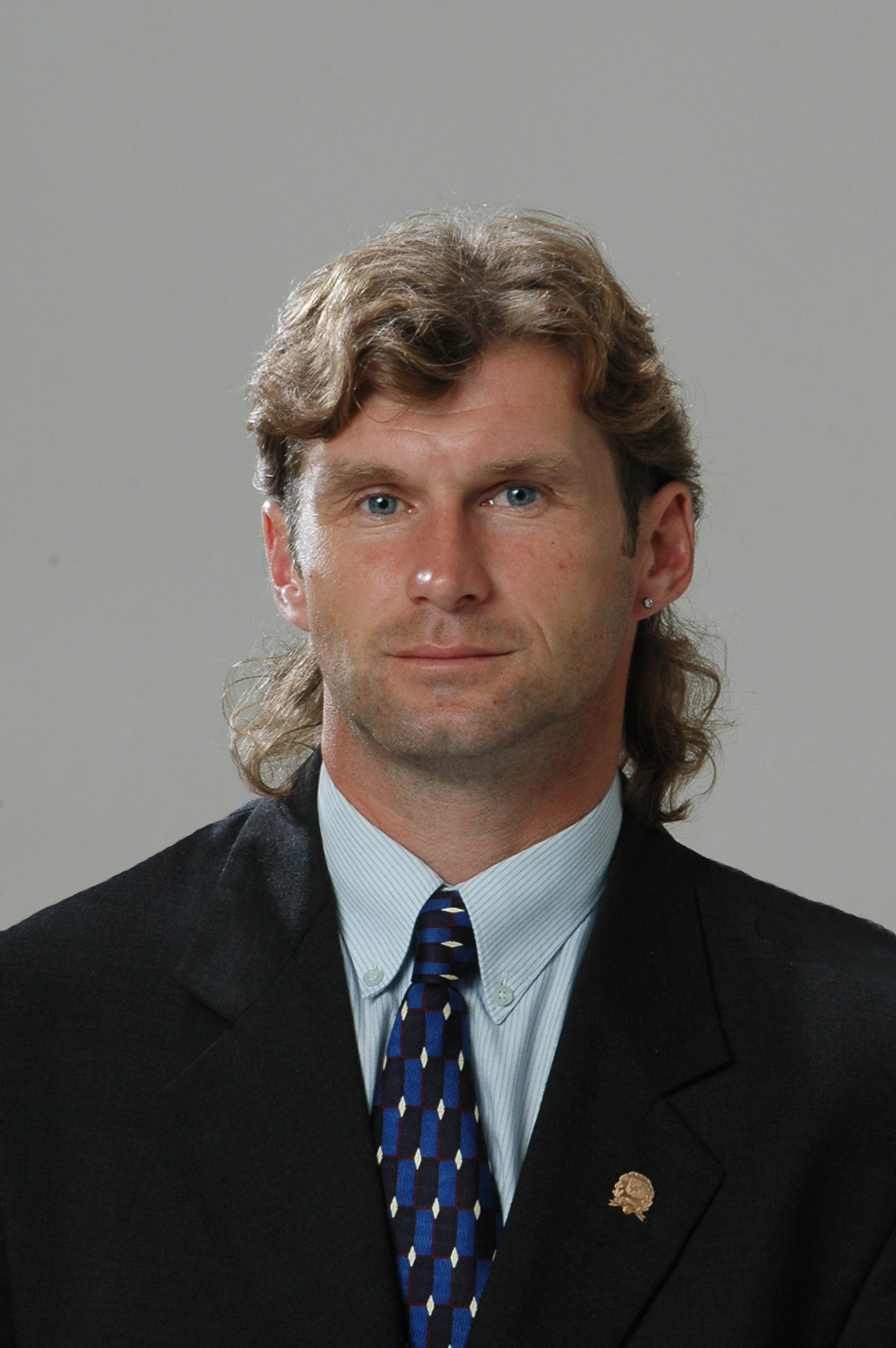

Personal information
- Full name: Mihails Zemļinskis
- Date of birth: 21 December 1969 (age 56)
- Place of birth: Riga, Latvian SSR, Soviet Union
- Height: 1.80 m (5 ft 11 in)
- Positions: Centre-back; sweeper

Senior career*
Years	Team	Apps	(Gls)
1988–1991	Zvezda Ventspils	0	(0)
1991–1997	Skonto Riga	120	(29)
1994	BVSC Budapest	6	(0)
1997–1998	Hapoel Kfar Saba	17	(0)
1998–2005	Skonto Riga	132	(28)
Total		275	(57)

International career
1992–2005	Latvia	105	(12)

Managerial career
- 2009–2011: Latvia U-21
- * Club domestic league appearances and goals

Mihails Zemļinskis (born 21 December 1969) is a Latvian politician and former professional footballer. He played as a centre-back or sweeper, making over 100 appearances for the Latvia national team.

== Football career ==
Zemļinskis spent most of his career at Skonto FC except for short periods at BVSC Budapest and at Hapoel Kfar Saba. He was a skilled central defender and played for the Latvia national team after the country regained its independence in 1991. He played 105 matches and scored 12 goals for the national team, and took part in the 2004 European Championships in Portugal. Zemļinskis wore the number 4 jersey. He eventually became a football coach at FC Daugava. He also coached the Latvia U21 team.

== Political career ==
Since 2009 he has been a member of the Latvian parliament Saeima for the Social Democratic Party, commonly referred to as "Harmony". According to a request made to the European Parliament, Zemļinskis was listed as a member of the Coalition pour la Vie et la Famille (CPVF) at the European level, a hodgepodge European party of conservative, extreme right, populist, eurosceptic, regionalist and neonazi members of national and regional parliaments from seven EU countries. This was at odds with his national party's associate membership of the party of European Socialists and its only member of European parliament being a member of the party of European Socialists. As of 19 April 2018, Zemļinskis was listed as a member of the Alliance for Peace and Freedom since 15 September 2015 in that European party's declaration of representatives registered with the Authority for European Political Parties and European Political Foundations.

== Honours ==
Skonto Riga

- Baltic Cup: 1993, 1995
- Latvian Champion (11): 1992, 1993, 1994, 1995, 1998, 1999, 2000, 2001, 2002, 2003, 2004

Individual

- Latvian Footballer of the Year: 1998

== See also ==
- List of men's footballers with 100 or more international caps
