= Andrėjus Tereškinas =

Lithuanian footballer

Personal information
- Full name: Andrėjus Tereškinas
- Date of birth: 10 July 1970 (age 56)
- Place of birth: Telšiai, Lithuanian SSR, Soviet Union
- Height: 1.85 m (6 ft 1 in)
- Position: Left-back

Senior career*
Years	Team	Apps	(Gls)
1990–1997	Žalgiris		
1996	→ CSKA Moscow (loan)	0	(0)
1997–1998	Stomil Olsztyn	11	(1)
1998–2001	Skonto	38	(3)
2000–2001	→ Macclesfield Town (loan)	1	(0)
2002–2004	Žalgiris	24	(5)
2004	Almaty	9	(0)
2005	Žalgiris	24	(0)

International career
1991–2000	Lithuania	56	(3)
- * Club domestic league appearances and goals

Andrėjus Tereškinas (born 10 July 1970) is a Lithuanian former professional footballer who played as a left-back.

He had a brief loan spell with Macclesfield Town during the 2000–01 season, where he appeared in just one match as a substitute.

Tereškinas made 56 appearances for the Lithuania national football team between 1991 and 2000.

He played one game for PFC CSKA Moscow in the 1996–97 UEFA Cup.

== Honours ==
Žalgiris

- A Lyga: 1991, 1991–92
- Lithuanian Cup: 1991, 1992–93, 1993–94, 1996–97, 2003

Skonto

- Latvian Higher League: 1998, 1999, 2000, 2001
- Latvian Cup: 1998, 2000, 2001

Lithuania

- Baltic Cup: 1991, 1992, 1994
