= Audrius Žuta =

Lithuanian footballer and referee

Personal information
- Full name: Audrius Žuta
- Date of birth: 5 January 1969 (age 57)
- Place of birth: Klaipėda, Lithuanian SSR, USSR
- Height: 1.76 m (5 ft 9 1/2 in)
- Position: Midfielder

Senior career*
Years	Team	Apps	(Gls)
1986–1989	Atlantas Klaipėda	100	(34)
1990	Sirijus Klaipėda		
1991–1993	Dinamo Minsk	79	(17)
1994	Sirijus Klaipėda	12	(2)
1994–1996	Atlantas Klaipėda	43	(36)
1996–1998	Kareda Siauliai	60	(15)
1999	Atlantas Klaipėda	6	(3)
1999	Ventspils	17	(1)
2000	FBK Kaunas	29	(6)
2001	Žalgiris Vilnius	4	(0)
2001–2002	Atlantas Klaipėda	35	(7)

International career
1992–1995	Lithuania	26	(2)
- * Club domestic league appearances and goals

Audrius Žuta (born 5 January 1969) is a Lithuanian former football player and referee.

== Career ==
He obtained a total number of 26 caps for the Lithuania national football team, scoring two goals. After retirement from playing he worked as football referee from 2002 until 2007.
