= Dzintar Klavan =

Estonian footballer

Personal information
- Date of birth: 18 June 1961 (age 65)
- Place of birth: Viljandi, then part of Estonian SSR, Soviet Union
- Position: Midfielder

Senior career*
Years	Team	Apps	(Gls)
1983–1984	Tallinna KSMK		
1984–1990	Viljandi FK		
1990	Tallinna Sport		
1990–1991	Porvoon Weikot		
1992	Viljandi Tulevik		
1993	TSB Flensburg		
1994–1995	Flora		
1996–1998	Viljandi Tulevik		
1999–2000	Valga Warrior		
2008–2009	Toompea		

International career
1993–1995	Estonia	19	(0)
- * Club domestic league appearances and goals

Dzintar Klavan (born 18 June 1961) is an Estonian former international footballer who played as a midfielder. He played for FC Flora Tallinn, JK Viljandi Tulevik, and FC Warrior Valga.

== International career ==
Klavan made a total of 19 caps for the Estonia national team during his career. He was a winger. He earned his first official cap on 21 February 1993, when Estonia met Latvia in an indoor friendly.

== Personal life ==
He has a son, Ragnar Klavan, who was a professional footballer and is regarded as one of the best Estonian football players of all time. Ragnar has been capped by the Estonian national team 130 times. As of 2014, Dzintar continued to be actively involved in the sport and also ran a marathon.
