= 2007–08 FC Oțelul Galați season =

FC Oțelul
2007–08 season
- Chairman: Marius Stan
- Manager: Petre Grigoraş
- Liga I: 8th
- Cupa României: Round of 16
- UEFA Intertoto: Winners
- UEFA Cup: 2nd qual. round
- Top goalscorer: League: Jula (17); All: Jula (22); Szekely (6); Jelev (5); Paraschiv (5); Stan (5); Viglianti (3)

== Match results ==
=== Friendlies ===
27 June 2007	Oțelul Galați	0–2	FC Farul	Braşov
18:00	Crişan (red card) 105'; Székely (red card) 119'		Apostol 24'; Nae 109'	Stadium: Metrom

29 June 2007	Oțelul Galați	1–5	Dinamo	Braşov
19:00	Jula 20' (pen.); Ilie (yellow card) (yellow-red card)		Cristea 8'; Dănciulesc 9'; Bratu 44', 90' (pen.); Opriţa 81'	Stadium: Metrom; Referee: Florin Ghimbăşan

30 June 2007	Oțelul Galați	2–3 ( 0–0 a.e.t.)	FC Farul	Braşov
09:00				Stadium: ICIM; Referee: Marius Bocăneală

4 July 2007	Oțelul Galați	2–5	Dacia Mioveni	Braşov
18:30	Paraschiv 2'; Stan 60'		Chirciu 10'; Costescu 15'; Vrăjitoarea 40'; Ene 81'; Drăghici 85'	Stadium: Metrom

17 October 2007	Oțelul Galați	8–2	Oțelul II	Galați
	Stan,,, Székely,, Jula		Ionescu (?); Elek	Stadium: Oțelul

16 January 2008 Turkey	Oțelul Galați (Romania)	1–3	(Germany) Energie	Lara
15:00	Paraschiv 25'		Rangelov 31', 63'; Sørensen 68'	Stadium: Titanic Resort

18 January 2008 Turkey	Oțelul Galați (Romania)	1–0	(Germany) FC Köln	Antalya
16:00	Jula 68'			Stadium: Topkapi Resort

20 January 2008 Turkey	Oțelul Galați (Romania)	3–3	(Ukraine) Naftovyk	Side
16:00	Elek 1'; Labukas 31'; Stan 78'		Ilie 13' (o.g.); Snytko 82', 89'

22 January 2008 Turkey	Oțelul Galați (Romania)	1–1	(Ukraine) FC Kharkiv	Antalya
15:00	Zhelev 35'		Aladashvili 51'	Stadium: Miracle Resort

24 January 2008 Turkey	Oțelul Galați (Romania)	2–3	(Ukraine) FC Metalurh	Belek
15:00	Ilie 42', 45'		Tymchenko 7', 18'; Kasyanov 67'	Stadium: Arcadia

2 February 2008 Cyprus	Oțelul Galați (Romania)	1–1	(Czech Republic) FK Teplice	Ayia Napa
15:00	Gado 15'		Hesek 4'

5 February 2008 Cyprus	Oțelul Galați (Romania)	4–2	(Ukraine) Dynamo II	Ayia Napa
15:00	Székely 64'; Elek 69'; Zhelev 85'; Jula 89'		? 74' ? 82'

7 February 2008 Cyprus	Oțelul Galați (Romania)	2–0	(Bulgaria) Levski	Ayia Napa
15:00	Paraschiv 22'; Stan 44'

9 February 2008 Cyprus	Oțelul Galați (Romania)	3–3	(Romania) CFR Cluj	Larnaca
15:00	Jula 7' (red card) 37'; Stan 26'; Székely 63'		Tony 66'; Minteuan 68'; Ruiz 87'

10 February 2008 Cyprus	Oțelul Galați (Romania)	1–7	(Serbia) Red Star	Larnaca
15:00	Elek 62'		?,,,,,,

=== UEFA Intertoto ===
7 July 2007 Second round 1st leg	FK Slavija (Bosnia and Herzegovina)	0–0	(Romania) Oțelul Galați	Sarajevo
21:15	Jovanović (yellow card) 46'; Regoje (yellow card) 90+1'		Nogo (yellow card) 41' (yellow-red card) 78'; Cârjă (yellow card) 75'	Stadium: Asim Ferhatović; Attendance: 1,000; Referee: (Switzerland) Sascha Kever

14 July 2007 Second round 2nd leg	Oțelul Galați (Romania)	3–0	(Bosnia and Herzegovina) FK Slavija	Galați
18:00	Jula 30', 41'; Paraschiv 69'; Boghiu (yellow card) 89'		Benović (yellow card) 44' (yellow-red card) 74'	Stadium: Oțelul; Attendance: 6,000; Referee: (Hungary) Mihály Fabian

21 July 2007 Third round 1st leg	Oțelul Galați (Romania)	2–1	(Turkey) Trabzonspor	Galați
18:00	Stan 27', (yellow card) 63'; Paraschiv (yellow card) 64', (goal) 86'; Zhelev (yellow card) 67'; Giurgiu (yellow card) 88'; Labukas (yellow card) 90+3'		Yattara (red card) 30'; Çağdaş (yellow card) 66' (yellow-red card) 90+3'; Ersen 83'	Stadium: Oțelul; Attendance: 5,000; Referee: (Spain) César Muniz Fernandez

28 July 2007 Third round 2nd leg	Trabzonspor (Turkey)	1–2	(Romania) Oțelul Galați	Trabzon
19:30	Ceyhun 8', (yellow card) 56'		Székely 12', (yellow card) 52'; Zhelev (yellow card) 63'; Jula 88' (pen.)	Stadium: Hüseyin Avni Aker; Attendance: 20,000; Referee: (Russia) Stanislav Sukhina

=== UEFA Cup ===
16 August 2007 2nd qualifying round 1st leg	Lokomotiv Sofia (Bulgaria)	3–1	(Romania) Oțelul Galați	Sofia
20:30	Dafchev 19'; Dobrev (yellow card) 20'; Baldovaliev 62'; Đilas 84'		Semeghin (yellow card) 29', (goal) 74'	Stadium: Balgarska Armiya; Attendance: 3,000; Referee: (Finland) Jouni Hyytiä

30 August 2007 2nd qualifying round 2nd leg	Oțelul Galați (Romania)	0–0	(Bulgaria) Lokomotiv Sofia	Galați
17:00	Salif Nogo (yellow card) 13'; Gado (yellow card) 88'		Antunović (yellow card) 40'; Dafchev (yellow card) 40'; Ivanov (yellow card) 52'; Golubović (yellow card) 55'; Markov (yellow card) 55'; Baldovaliev (yellow card) 68'; Karadzhinov (yellow card) 76'	Stadium: Oțelul; Attendance: 12,000; Referee: (Portugal) Paulo Manuel Gomes Costa

=== Liga I ===
==== League table ====
Pos	Team	Pld	W	D	L	GF	GA	GD	Pts	Qualification or relegation
1	CFR Cluj (C)	34	23	7	4	52	22	+30	76	Qualification to Champions League group stage
2	Steaua București	34	23	6	5	51	19	+32	75	Qualification to Champions League third qualifying round
3	Rapid București	34	18	7	9	52	31	+21	61 (Note: RAP: 7 pts; DIN: 5 pts; UNI: 3 pts)	Qualification to UEFA Cup first round
4	Dinamo București	34	17	10	7	55	36	+19	61	Qualification to UEFA Cup first round
5	Unirea Urziceni	34	16	13	5	42	24	+18	61	Qualification to UEFA Cup first round
6	Politehnica Timișoara	34	16	9	9	57	44	+13	57	Qualification to UEFA Cup first round
7	Vaslui	34	12	11	11	44	34	+10	47	Qualification to Intertoto Cup third round
8	Oțelul Galați	34	14	4	16	47	50	−3	46	
9	FC U Craiova	34	12	7	15	42	48	−6	43	
10	Gloria Bistrița	34	11	9	14	34	40	−6	42	
11	Politehnica Iași	34	11	8	15	37	41	−4	41	
12	Pandurii Târgu Jiu	34	11	7	16	36	43	−7	40 (Note: PAN 0-1 FAR; FAR 1-2 PAN)	
13	Farul Constanța	34	10	10	14	25	38	−13	40	
14	Gloria Buzău	34	10	7	17	30	56	−26	37	
15	Ceahlăul Piatra Neamț (R)	34	10	6	18	33	46	−13	36	Relegation to Liga II
16	Dacia Mioveni (R)	34	7	10	17	26	43	−17	31	Relegation to Liga II
17	UTA Arad (R)	34	6	8	20	30	52	−22	26	Relegation to Liga II
18	Universitatea Cluj (R)	34	4	11	19	32	58	−26	23	Relegation to Liga II

Source: LT (in Romanian)
Rules for classification: 1) points; 2) head-to-head points; 3) head-to-head goal difference; 4) head-to-head goals scored; 5) goal difference; 6) number of goals scored.
(C) Champions; (R) Relegated

==== Results by round ====
Round	1	2	3	4	5	6	7	8	9	10	11	12	13	14	15	16	17	18	19	20	21	22	23	24	25	26	27	28	29	30	31	32	33	34
Ground	H	A	H	A	H	A	H	A	H	A	A	H	A	H	A	H	A	A	H	A	H	A	H	A	H	A	H	H	A	H	A	H	A	H
Result	L	L	W	L	W	L	W	L	W	L	L	W	L	L	W	W	D	L	W	D	L	W	L	L	W	L	L	W	D	L	W	W	W	D
Position	16	16	13	14	12	12	11	11	9	10	10	9	10	11	9	9	9	9	9	9	9	9	9	9	9	10	10	10	10	10	9	8	8	8

Updated to match(es) played on 7 May. Source: Matches
A = Away; H = Home; W = Win; D = Draw; L = Loss

==== Results summary ====
Overall								Home						Away					
Pld	W	D	L	GF	GA	GD	Pts	W	D	L	GF	GA	GD	W	D	L	GF	GA	GD
34	14	4	16	47	50	−3	46	10	1	6	28	19	+9	4	3	10	19	31	−12

==== Matches ====
1 August 2007 Matchday 1	Oțelul Galați	0–1	CFR Cluj	Galați
18:30	Kim (yellow card) 29'; Ilie (yellow card) 35'; Jula (yellow card) 79'		Trică 15' (pen.); Dani (yellow card) 11'; Semedo (yellow card) 65'	Stadium: Oțelul; Attendance: 9,000; Referee: Ionică Serea

5 August 2007 Matchday 2	Pandurii Târgu Jiu	1–0	Oțelul Galați	Târgu Jiu
18:30	Popescu (yellow card) 26'; Mihai 55', (yellow card) 82'; Păcurar (yellow card) 73'		Radnikov (yellow card) 29' (yellow-red card) 45'; Székely (yellow card) 42'; Nogo (yellow card) 44'; Zhelev (yellow card) 86'	Stadium: Tudor Vladimirescu; Attendance: 5,000; Referee: Andrei Ioniţă

11 August 2007 Matchday 3	Oțelul Galați	3–2	Unirea Urziceni	Galați
17:00	Gado 1', (yellow card) 1'; Zhelev 27'; Kim (yellow card) 38'; Székely (yellow card) 50', (goal) 89'; Semeghin (yellow card) 65'		Dănalache 3'; Gomes (yellow card) 57'; Bilaşco 77'; Bordeanu (yellow card) 81'	Stadium: Oțelul; Attendance: 6,000; Referee: Sorin Corpodean

19 August 2007 Matchday 4	Rapid București	4–2	Oțelul Galați	Bucharest
18:45	Mazilu 3'; Grigore (yellow card) 21'; Maftei 36'; Burdujan 45+2'; Dică 45+4' (pen.)		Jula 22' (pen.); Zhelev (yellow card) 25'; Ngapounou (yellow card) 26'; Kouha (red card) 34'; Székely 39'; Gado (yellow card) 44'	Stadium: Giuleşti – Valentin Stănescu; Attendance: 7,000; Referee: Victor Berbecaru

25 August 2007 Matchday 5	Oțelul Galați	2–1	UTA Arad	Galați
17:00	Roszel 53' (o.g.); Jula 64' (pen.); Semeghin (yellow card) 90+5'		Roszel (yellow card) 20'; Chiriţă (yellow card) 27'; Edson 86', (yellow card) 90+5'	Stadium: Oțelul; Attendance: 6,000; Referee: Marius Martiş

2 September 2007 Matchday 6	SC Vaslui	2–0	Oțelul Galați	Vaslui
17:00	Ljubinković 28'; Jovanović 86', (red card) 87'		Jula (yellow card) 87'; Paraschiv (yellow card) 87'	Stadium: Municipal; Attendance: 7,000; Referee: Alexandru Tudor

15 September 2007 Matchday 7	Oțelul Galați	3–1	Dacia Mioveni	Galați
17:00	Jula 15', 32' (pen.); Székely 30'; Labukas (yellow card) 86'		Baicu (yellow card) 45'; Daouda (yellow card) 47'; Murgan (yellow card) 52'; Vrăjitoarea 65'; Dobre (yellow card) 68'	Stadium: Oțelul; Attendance: 4,000; Referee: Marius Avram

22 September 2007 Matchday 8	Gloria Bistriţa	2–1	Oțelul Galați	Bistriţa
17:00	Coroian 20'; Nalaţi (yellow card) 28'; Pârvu 51'		Costin (yellow card) 15', (goal) 22'	Stadium: Gloria; Attendance: 2,000; Referee: Istvan Kovacs

30 September 2007 Matchday 9	Oțelul Galați	2–1	U. Cluj	Galați
17:00	Paraschiv 48'; Semeghin (yellow card) 58'; Zhelev (yellow card) 87'; Nogo 90+3'		Park (yellow card) 8'; Suller 19'; Jovanović (yellow card) 42'; Olah (yellow card) 74'; Savu (yellow card) 87'	Stadium: Oțelul; Attendance: 6,000; Referee: Stefan Erdei

7 October 2007 Matchday 10	Dinamo București	6–1	Oțelul Galați	Bucharest
17:00	Moţi 16'; Bratu 22', 68'; Dănciulescu 42' (pen.), 81', 85'; Cristea (yellow card) 45'		Zhelev 14'; Kouha (yellow card) 39'; Nogo (yellow card) 87'	Stadium: Dinamo; Attendance: 2,000; Referee: Mugurel Drăgănescu

20 October 2007 Matchday 11	FC Timișoara	4–1	Oțelul Galați	Timișoara
18:00	Borş 38' (o.g.); McKain 41'; Arm. Karamyan 61', 70'		Stan 35', (yellow card) 45'; Semeghin (yellow card) 39'	Stadium: Dan Păltinişanu; Attendance: 8,000; Referee: Cristian Balaj

27 October 2007 Matchday 12	Oțelul Galați	2–1	Universitatea Craiova	Galați
14:00	Paraschiv 27'; Sârghi (yellow card) 51'; Ilie (yellow card) 55'; Jula (yellow card) 74'; Labukas (yellow card) 83'; Zhelev 86'		Ciucă (yellow card) 27'; Stoica (yellow card) 55'; Wobay 59', (yellow card) 62'	Stadium: Oțelul; Attendance: 4,000; Referee: Augustus Constantin

31 October 2007 Matchday 13	Steaua București	3–1	Oțelul Galați	Bucharest
20:30	Dică 7', 66' (pen.); Semeghin 32' (o.g.); Nicoliţă (yellow card) 51'; Croitoru (yellow card) 72'		Ionescu (yellow card) 20'; Sârghi (yellow card) 40'; Székely 52'; Zhelev (yellow card) 65'; Stan (yellow card) 80'; Costin (yellow card) 90+3'	Stadium: Steaua; Attendance: 16,000; Referee: Ionel Ivan

3 November 2007 Matchday 14	Oțelul Galați	2–3	Gloria Buzău	Galați
14:00	Iorga (yellow card) 52'; Jula 76', (yellow card) 85', (goal) 86' (pen.); Labukas (yellow card) 81'; Costin (yellow card) 83'; Paraschiv (yellow card) 90+2'		Vlaicu 1'; Liţu (yellow card) 15'; Simion 27', (yellow card) 55'; Jozić (yellow card) 54'; Ionescu 59'; Eze (yellow card) 87'; Tudose (yellow card) 88'; Mincă (yellow card) 90'; Paleacu (yellow card) 90+1'	Stadium: Oțelul; Attendance: 4,000; Referee: Radu Petrescu

11 November 2007 Matchday 15	Ceahlăul Piatra Neamţ	0–1	Oțelul Galați	Piatra Neamţ
14:00	Golban (yellow card) 36'; Oprea (yellow card) 43'; Rusmir (yellow card) 82'; Frunză (yellow card) 89'		Ilie 28'; Brujan (yellow card) 40'; Costin (yellow card) 59'; Székely (yellow card) 74'; Labukas (yellow card) 86'; Zhelev (yellow card) 90+3'	Stadium: Ceahlăul; Attendance: 2,000; Referee: Laurenţiu Danşa

25 November 2007 Matchday 16	Oțelul Galați	2–0	Farul Constanţa	Galați
13:00	Jula 64'; Stan 88' (pen.)		Pătraşcu (yellow card) 71'; Guriţă (yellow card) 87'	Stadium: Oțelul; Attendance: 3,000; Referee: Alexandru Tudor

2 December 2007 Matchday 17	Politehnica Iaşi	2–2	Oțelul Galați	Iaşi
16:45	Milea 19'; Mijin (yellow card) 32'; Munteanu (yellow card) 60'; Buta (yellow card) 69'; Černoch 89'		Székely 6'; Stan 13'; Semeghin (yellow card) 39'; Iorga (yellow card) 81'	Stadium: Emil Alexandrescu; Attendance: 2,000; Referee: Sorin Corpodean

9 December 2007 Matchday 18	CFR Cluj	3–1	Oțelul Galați	Cluj-Napoca
21:00	Didi 12'; Tony 63'; Fabbiani 75'		Grybauskas (yellow card) 35'; Brujan (yellow card) 52'; Stan (yellow card) 61'; Jula 80'	Stadium: Dr. Constantin Rădulescu; Attendance: 7,000; Referee: Alexandru Deaconu

15 December 2007 Matchday 19	Oțelul Galați	3–1	Pandurii Târgu Jiu	Galați
13:00	Jula 4' (pen.), 50'; Paraschiv 38'		Iordache (red card) 4'; Djakpa 28' (pen.), (red card) 61'	Stadium: Oțelul; Attendance: 1,500; Referee: Teodor Crăciunescu

23 February 2008 Matchday 20	Unirea Urziceni	0–0	Oțelul Galați	Urziceni
16:00	Galamaz (yellow card) 10'		Semeghin (yellow card) 10'; Costin (yellow card) 59'; Labukas (yellow card) 88'	Stadium: Tineretului (Urziceni); Attendance: 4,000; Referee: Augustus Constantin

2 March 2008 Matchday 21	Oțelul Galați	0–1	Rapid București	Galați
15:30	Deac (yellow card) 43'; Paraschiv (yellow card) 44' (yellow-red card) 83'; Viglianti (yellow card) 55'; Brujan (yellow card) 72' (yellow-red card) 78'		Matos (yellow card) 10'; Léonard (yellow card) 42'; Coman (yellow card) 42'; Grigore (yellow card) 45'; Boya 76'	Stadium: Oțelul; Attendance: 12,000; Referee: Ovidiu Haţegan

8 March 2008 Matchday 22	UTA Arad	0–1	Oțelul Galați	Arad
15:30	Tudor (yellow card) 44'; Dan (yellow card) 57'		Ilie (yellow card) 13'; Jula 44' (pen.); Nogo (yellow card) 50'; Kolev (yellow card) 66'; Iorga (yellow card) 88'	Stadium: Francisc von Neumann; Attendance: 2,000; Referee: Mugurel Drăgănescu

15 March 2008 Matchday 23	Oțelul Galați	0–3	SC Vaslui	Galați
15:00	Deac (yellow card) 32'; Deac 60'; Viglianti (yellow card) 67'; Jula (yellow card) 76'; Costin (yellow card) 90+3'	(Report)	Apostol (yellow card) 8'; Mardare (yellow card) 57'; Bălace (yellow card) 61'; Ljubinković (yellow card) 70'; N'Doye (yellow card) 74', (goal) 89'; Hăisan (yellow card) 77'	Stadium: Oțelul; Attendance: 6,000; Referee: Marius Avram
Note: The match originally ended 1–1, but was awarded 0–3 after a disciplinary decision.

19 March 2008 Matchday 24	Dacia Mioveni	1–0	Oțelul Galați	Mioveni
15:00	Neagoe (yellow card) 71'; Bratu 81'; Baicu (yellow card) 90+2'		Paraschiv (red card) 74'	Stadium: Dacia; Attendance: 2,000; Referee: Ionică Serea

23 March 2008 Matchday 25	Oțelul Galați	2–0	Gloria Bistriţa	Galați
15:30	Székely 27'; Stan 69'			Stadium: Oțelul; Attendance: 6,000; Referee: Aurelian Bogaciu

29 March 2008 Matchday 26	U. Cluj	2–1	Oțelul Galați	Cluj-Napoca
15:30	Goga (yellow card) 45', (goal) 60'; Savu (red card) 46'; Jovanović (red card) 54'; Silvăşan 66' (pen.); Băd (yellow card) 80'; Şoltuz (yellow card) 90'		Zhelev 17'; Costin (yellow card) 30' (red card) 65'	Stadium: Ion Moina; Attendance: 3,000; Referee: Sebastian Colţescu

5 April 2008 Matchday 27	Oțelul Galați	0–1	Dinamo București	Galați
16:30	Zhelev (yellow card) 54'; Ilie (yellow card) 59'		Dănciulescu 64'; Izvoranu (yellow card) 79'; Lobonţ (yellow card) 86'	Stadium: Oțelul; Attendance: 8,000; Referee: Augustus Constantin

9 April 2008 Matchday 28	Oțelul Galați	3–1	FC Timișoara	Galați
17:00	Viglianti 8', (yellow card) 59'; Deac 38'; Nogo (yellow card) 58'; Stan 81'; Kolev (yellow card) 90+3'		Arm. Karamyan (yellow card) 36', (goal) 90+23'; Ganea (yellow card) 50'	Stadium: Oțelul; Attendance: 7,000; Referee: Marius Martiş

12 April 2008 Matchday 29	Universitatea Craiova	1–1	Oțelul Galați	Craiova
16:30	Dina 42'; Mitchell (yellow card) 84'		Paraschiv 16'; Elek (yellow card) 90+1'	Stadium: Extensiv; Attendance: 3,000; Referee: Laurenţiu Danşa

19 April 2008 Matchday 30	Oțelul Galați	0–1	Steaua București	Galați
17:00			Pleşan 81'; J. Moreno (yellow card) 89'	Stadium: Oțelul; Attendance: 12,000; Referee: Cristian Balaj

23 April 2008 Matchday 31	Gloria Buzău	0–4	Oțelul Galați	Buzău
16:45	Paleacu (yellow card) 58'; Gheorghiţă (yellow card) 89'; Tudose (yellow card) 90'		Jula 7', (yellow card) 56', (goal) 84'; Deac (yellow card) 38'; Viglianti (yellow card) 55', (goal) 83'	Stadium: Municipal; Attendance: 3,000; Referee: Alexandru Tudor

26 April 2008 Matchday 32	Oțelul Galați	4–1	Ceahlăul Piatra Neamţ	Galați
16:30	Jula 7', 89' (pen.); Sălăgeanu (yellow card) 30'; Viglianti 39'; Paraschiv 50'		Forminte 44'	Stadium: Oțelul; Attendance: 5,000; Referee: Mugurel Drăgănescu

4 May 2008 Matchday 33	Farul Constanţa	0–2	Oțelul Galați	Constanţa
16:45	Gerlem (yellow card) 77'		Jula 25', (yellow card) 55'; Zhelev 70'; Kolev (yellow card) 81'	Stadium: Farul; Attendance: 2,000; Referee: Marius Avram

7 May 2008 Matchday 34	Oțelul Galați	0–0	Politehnica Iaşi	Galați
17:00	Nogo (yellow card) 82'		Bâlbă (yellow card) 45'; Beršnjak (yellow card) 63'; Buta (yellow card) 69'; Paruolo (yellow card) 87'; Brăneţ (yellow card) 90+4'	Stadium: Oțelul; Attendance: 4,000; Referee: Augustus Constantin

=== Cupa României ===
26 September 2007 Round of 32	Concordia Chiajna	0–6	Oțelul Galați	Chiajna
15:30			Jula 16'; Stan 20', 36'; Gado (yellow card) 26'; Elek 78', 85'; Brujan 90+1'	Stadium: Concordia; Attendance: 2,000; Referee: Alexandru Deaconu

6 December 2007 Round of 16	Braşov	2–2 (a.e.t.) (5–4 p)	Oțelul Galați	Ploieşti
16:15	Paulo Adriano (yellow card) 21'; Cristescu 64'; Ilyeş 65' (pen.); Constantin (yellow card) 103' (yellow-red card) 110'; Nae (yellow card) 107'		Ilie 15', (yellow card) 31'; Jula 24'; Paraschiv (yellow card) 47'; Costin (red card) 53'; Labukas (yellow card) 76'; Székely (yellow card) 111'	Stadium: Astra; Attendance: 2,000; Referee: Sebastian Colţescu
	Penalties
	Ilyeş (penalty scored); Ionescu (penalty scored); Paulo Adriano (penalty scored); Hadnagy (penalty missed); Cristescu (penalty missed); Roman (penalty scored); Oroş (penalty scored)		(penalty scored) Jula; (penalty missed) Stan; (penalty missed) Paraschiv; (penalty scored) Zhelev; (penalty scored) Székely; (penalty scored) Semeghin; (penalty missed) Labukas

== Players ==
=== Squad statistics ===
				Total			Liga I		Cupa României		Intertoto Cup		UEFA Cup	
No.	Pos.	Nat.	Name	Sts	App	Gls	App	Gls	App	Gls	App	Gls	App	Gls
0	MF	(Romania)	Avram		1		1							
0	FW	(Romania)	Byahanski		3		3							
0	CF	(Moldova)	Boghiu	1	3		2				1			
0	GK	(Romania)	Borş	4	5		4						1	
0	MF	(Romania)	Brujan	7	12	1	11		1	1				
0	FW	(Romania)	Cârjan		1						1			
0	FB	(Romania)	Cârjă	1	7		3		1		1		2	
0	FB	(Romania)	Cojoc	4	7		7							
0	CB	(Romania)	Costin	27	28	1	26	1	2					
0	WI	(Romania)	Deac	15	15	1	15	1						
0	FW	(Romania)	Elek		23	2	21		1	2	1			
0	RB	(Romania)	Gado	19	21	1	16	1	2		1		2	
0	DM	(Romania)	Giurgiu	18	19		14				4		1	
0	GK	(Lithuania)	Grybauskas	14	16		10		1		4		1	
0	FW	(Romania)	Ilie	23	35	2	27	1	2	1	4		2	
0	MF	(Romania)	Ionescu	4	9		8		1					
0	MF	(Romania)	Iorga	11	19		18		1					
0	FW	(Romania)	Jula	41	41	22	33	17	2	2	4	3	2	
0	WI	(South Korea)	Kim	10	12		6				4		2	
0	GK	(Bulgaria)	Kolev	15	15		15							
0	GK	(Morocco)	Kouha	9	9		8		1					
0	CF	(Lithuania)	Labukas	10	30		22		2		4		2	
0	DF	(Cameroon)	Ngapounou	3	4		2						2	
0	CB	(Burkina Faso)	Nogo	25	25	1	19	1	1		3		2	
0	AM	(Romania)	Paraschiv	38	38	7	30	5	2		4	2	2	
0	MF	(Estonia)	Ratnikov	1	7		3				2		2	
0	LB/LM	(Romania)	Sălăgeanu	7	11		11							
0	FB	(Romania)	Sârghi	20	23		17		1		4		1	
0	FB	(Romania)	Semeghin	23	25	1	17		2		4		2	1
0	FW	(Romania)	Stan	32	33	8	27	5	2	2	4	1		
0	RW	(Romania)	Székely	32	32	7	26	6	1		4	1	1	
0	AM	(Argentina)	Viglianti	11	15	3	15	3						
0	CB	(Bulgaria)	Zhelev	37	37	5	32	5	2		2		1	

Last updated: 2009-03-08
Source: official website and Viaţa Liberă
Ordered by player name
0 shown as blank

=== Transfers ===
==== In ====
No.	Pos.	Nat.	Name	Age	EU	Moving from	Type	Transfer window	Ends	Transfer fee	Source
–	GK	(Morocco)	Kouha	24	Non-EU	Raja Casablanca (Morocco)	Transfer	Summer		€150,000	
–	MF	(Estonia)	Ratnikov	23	EU	Maag Tammeka (Estonia)	Transfer	Summer		Undisclosed	
–	CB	(Bulgaria)	Zhelev	27	EU	Litex Lovech (Bulgaria)	Transfer	Summer		€150,000	
–	DF	(Cameroon)	Ngapounou	24	Non-EU	Žalgiris (Lithuania)	Transfer	Summer		Free	
–	FW	(Belarus)	Byahanski	26	Non-EU	Shakhtyor Soligorsk (Belarus)	Transfer	Summer		€25,000	
–	MF	(Romania)	Ionescu	22	EU	Argeș Pitești	Transfer	Summer	2009	Free	
–	DF	(Romania)	Sălăgeanu	24	EU	Someşul	Transfer	Winter		Undisclosed	
–	GK	(Bulgaria)	Kolev	31	EU	Lokomotiv Plovdiv (Bulgaria)	Transfer	Winter	2010	€40,000	
–	MF	(Argentina)	Viglianti	28	Non-EU	Bolívar (Bolivia)	Transfer	Winter		Free	
–	MF	(Romania)	Deac	21	EU	CFR Cluj	Loan	Winter	2009	Free	
–	MF	(Romania)	Giurgiu	25	EU	Rubin Kazan (Russia)	Loan	Winter	2008	Free	

==== Out ====
No.	Pos.	Nat.	Name	Age	EU	Moving to	Type	Transfer window	Transfer fee	Source
–	AM	(Romania)	Tănase	36	EU		Retired	Summer		
–	CB	(Romania)	Baciu	32	EU		Released	Summer		
–	DF	(Romania)	Crăciun	34	EU		Released	Summer		
–	MF	(Romania)	Mărginean	28	EU		Released	Summer		
–	GK	(Romania)	Vâtcă	25	EU	Steaua București	Transfer	Summer	€540,000	
–	MF	(Romania)	Giurgiu	24	EU	Rubin Kazan (Russia)	Transfer	Summer	€500,000	
–	MF	(South Korea)	Kim	29	Non-EU		AWOL	Summer	–	
–	MF	(Estonia)	Ratnikov	24	EU		Released	Summer	–	
–	DF	(Cambodia)	Ngapounou	24	Non-EU		Released	Summer	–	
–	FW	(Belarus)	Byahanski	26	Non-EU		Released	Summer	–	

EU = if holds or not a European Union passport; Country: when 2 flags, 1st flag = country that plays for internationally, 2nd flag = country of birth; N = number on jersey; P = Position (for position name, pause mouse pointer on abbreviation); Name = Name on jersey (for more extensive name, pause mouse pointer on name); Age = age on the day of the signing; Moving from = only indicate the club the player was playing before start playing for this club in this season, for the type of the moving see Status column; Moving to = only indicates the club the player is going to play next, for the type of the moving see Status column; Ends = when the player's current contract ends; n/a = Not applicable.
