= 2006–07 FC Oțelul Galați season =

FC Oțelul
2006–07 season
- Chairman: Marius Stan
- Manager: Petre Grigoraş
- Liga I: 5th
- Cupa României: Quarter-finals
- Top goalscorer: League: Jula (14); All: Jula (15); Stan (11); Paraschiv (7); Tănase (5); Labukas (4); Gado (3); Szekely (3); Baciu (2); Costin (2); Sik (2)

== Competitions ==
=== Friendlies ===
28 June 2006	Oțelul Galați	6–2	FCM Dunărea Galați	Galați
	Radu 14'; Apetrei 20'; Gado 48'; Elek 53'; Bănaru 62'; Tănase 85' (pen.)	(Report)	Mogoş 50' (pen.); Bozga 61'	Stadium: Oțelul; Referee: Marius Bocăneală

1 July 2006	Oțelul Galați	4–0	CF Brăila	Galați
	Costin 6'; Bănaru 16'; Jula 75'; Ilie 82'	(Report)		Stadium: Oțelul; Attendance: 300; Referee: Marius Bocăneală

5 July 2006 Austria	Oțelul Galați (Romania)	1–2	(Slovakia) MŠK Žilina	Leobersdorf
	?	(Report)	?,

8 July 2006 Austria	Oțelul Galați (Romania)	14–0	(Hungary) FC Sopron	Leobersdorf
	Jula,,, Paraschiv, Tănase, Rancan, Bădescu; Arhire; Brujan; Apetrei	(Report)

10 July 2006 Austria	Oțelul Galați (Romania)	0–0	(Austria) SK Schwadorf	Leobersdorf
		(Report)

11 July 2006 Austria	Oțelul Galați (Romania)	5–0	(Hungary) Makó FK	Leobersdorf
	Tănase,, Gado; Jula	(Report)

12 July 2006 Austria	Oțelul Galați (Romania)	2–1	(Austria) DSV Leoben	Leobersdorf
	Baciu; Elek	(Report)	?

13 July 2006 Austria	Oțelul Galați (Romania)	7–0	(Austria) Großpetersdorf	Leobersdorf
	Apetrei, Jula, Elek, Arhire	(Report)

July 2006 Austria	Oțelul Galați (Romania)	3–0	(Slovenia) NK Rudar Velenje	Leobersdorf
	?,,	(Report)

21 July 2006	Oțelul Galați	4–1	FC Politehnica Iaşi	Galați
18:00	Crăciun 22'; Stan 34', 61'; Jula 80'	(Report)	Bâlbă 54' (pen.)	Stadium: Oțelul; Attendance: 4,000

26 July 2006	FC Delta Tulcea	3–3	Oțelul Galați	Tulcea
	D. Petre ?' (pen.); Ciobanu; V. Creţu	(Report)	Tănase; Bădescu; Elek	Stadium: Delta; Attendance: 3,000

8 October 2006	Zimbru Chişinău (Moldova)	1–2	(Romania) Oțelul Galați	Chișinău
	Popescu		Bănaru; Jula	Stadium: Zimbru

24 January 2007 Turkey	Oțelul Galați (Romania)	3–2	(Azerbaijan) Neftchi Baku	Antalya
17:00	Jula 21'; Boghiu 62'; Graziunas 70'		Boret 28', 79'

26 January 2007 Turkey	Oțelul Galați (Romania)	3–1	(Russia) Energiya Khabarovsk	Antalya
11:00	Boghiu 11'; Jula 45'; Labukas 90+2'		Kochkin 20'

28 January 2007 Turkey	Oțelul Galați (Romania)	0–0	(Azerbaijan) MKT Araz	Antalya
15:00

29 January 2007 Turkey	Oțelul Galați (Romania)	1–1	(Ukraine) Zorya Luhansk	Antalya
11:00	Stan 45'		Anisinko 49'

30 January 2007 Turkey	Oțelul Galați (Romania)	3–2	(Austria) Wacker Innsbruck	Manavgat
15:00	Stan 23', 57'; János Székely 58'		Schrott 54'; Salbwari 66'

1 February 2007 Turkey	Oțelul Galați (Romania)	1–1	(Belarus) Dinamo Brest	Antalya
17:45	Nogo		?

6 February 2007 Cyprus	Oțelul Galați (Romania)	2–1	(Serbia) FK Rad	Larnaca
15:30	Semeghin 21'; Jula 37'		? 30'

8 February 2007 Cyprus	Oțelul Galați (Romania)	1–0	(Russia) Krylia Sovetov	Larnaca
17:30	Labukas 80'

10 February 2007 Cyprus	Oțelul Galați (Romania)	1–1	(Poland) Bełchatów	Paphos
15:00	Daniel Stan 25'		Nowak 87'

12 February 2007 Cyprus	Oțelul Galați (Romania)	4–1	(Armenia) Banants	Larnaca
	Giurgiu 17'; Paraschiv 49', 57'; Jula 77'		? 86'

14 February 2007 Cyprus	Oțelul Galați (Romania)	2–2	(Slovenia) Dubnica	Larnaca
17:30	Jula 55' (pen.), 86'		? 61' ? 70'

20 February 2007	Oțelul Galați	5–2	CF Brăila	Galați
14:00	Labukas 60'; Semeghin 67'; Mărginean 75', 90+3'; Jula 86'		Berceanu 25'; Roşu 58' (pen.)	Stadium: Oțelul; Referee: Marius Bocăneală

24 March 2007	Oțelul Galați	0–0	Unirea Urziceni	Galați
11:00				Stadium: Oțelul; Attendance: 1,500

11 April 2007	Oțelul Galați	1–2	CF Brăila	Galați
	Jula 67'		S. Drăgan 51'; Sârghi 60' (o.g.)	Stadium: Oțelul; Attendance: 300; Referee: Marius Bocăneală

=== Liga I ===
==== League table ====
Pos	Team	Pld	W	D	L	GF	GA	GD	Pts	Qualification or relegation
3	CFR Cluj	34	21	6	7	59	32	+27	69	Qualification to UEFA Cup second qualifying round
4	Rapid București	34	16	11	7	63	39	+24	59	Qualification to UEFA Cup first round
5	Oțelul Galați	34	17	5	12	60	56	+4	56	Qualification to Intertoto Cup second round
6	Gloria Bistrița	34	16	6	12	42	35	+7	54	Qualification to Intertoto Cup first round
7	Politehnica Timișoara	34	15	8	11	37	33	+4	53	

Source: LT (in Romanian)
Rules for classification: 1) points; 2) head-to-head points; 3) head-to-head goal difference; 4) head-to-head goals scored; 5) goal difference; 6) number of goals scored.

==== Results by round ====
Round	1	2	3	4	5	6	7	8	9	10	11	12	13	14	15	16	17	18	19	20	21	22	23	24	25	26	27	28	29	30	31	32	33	34
Ground	H	A	A	H	A	H	A	H	A	H	A	H	A	H	A	H	A	A	H	H	A	H	A	H	A	H	A	H	A	H	A	H	A	H
Result	L	L	L	W	W	W	W	W	W	W	L	W	L	L	L	D	D	L	D	W	L	W	L	W	L	W	D	W	L	W	D	W	W	W
Position	17	17	18	13	9	7	5	4	4	3	3	3	3	5	7	7	7	7	8	7	8	8	8	6	8	6	7	7	7	7	7	7	5	5

Source: Matches
A = Away; H = Home; W = Win; D = Draw; L = Loss

==== Results summary ====
Overall								Home						Away					
Pld	W	D	L	GF	GA	GD	Pts	W	D	L	GF	GA	GD	W	D	L	GF	GA	GD
34	17	5	12	60	56	+4	56	13	2	2	38	23	+15	4	3	10	22	33	−11

==== Matches ====
30 July 2006 Matchday 1	Oțelul Galați	1–3	CFR Cluj	Galați
18:00	Baciu (yellow card) 46'; Semeghin (yellow card) 48'; Tănase 85'	(Report)	Tilincă 3', 27', (yellow card) 52'; Pedro Oliveira (yellow card) 22'; Miclăuş (yellow card) 37'; Munteanu (yellow card) 45'; Manuel José (yellow card) 54'; Coroian 62' (pen.)	Stadium: Oțelul; Attendance: 5,000; Referee: Tiberiu Lajos

4 August 2006 Matchday 2	Farul Constanţa	3–1	Oțelul Galați	Constanţa
20:00	Gheară (yellow card) 6', (goal) 13'; Disney 41'; Apostol (yellow card) 75', (goal) 90+2'; Florea (yellow card) 90'	(Report)	Semeghin (yellow card) 32'; Tănase (yellow card) 48'; Gado 64'	Stadium: Farul; Attendance: 3,000; Referee: Augustus Constantin

11 August 2006 Matchday 3	Unirea Urziceni	1–0	Oțelul Galați	Urziceni
18:00	Pojer (yellow card) 59'; Jovanović (yellow card) 60'; Aldea 72'; Odoroabă (yellow card) 80'; Negoiţă (yellow card) 81'	(Report)	Brujan (yellow card) 26'; Nogo (yellow card) 65'; Paraschiv (yellow card) 79'; Tănase (yellow card) 90+1'	Stadium: Tineretului (Urziceni); Attendance: 7,000; Referee: Aurelian Simion

20 August 2006 Matchday 4	Oțelul Galați	3–1	Ceahlăul Piatra Neamţ	Galați
18:00	Gado (yellow card) 34'; Stan 40'; Costin 84'; Tănase 90+3'; Baciu (yellow card) 90+5'	(Report)	Viţelaru (yellow card) 9'; Ilie 17'; Nohai (yellow card) 39'; Avădanei (yellow card) 66'; Simić (yellow card) 68'	Stadium: Oțelul; Attendance: 3,000; Referee: Alexandru Tudor

27 August 2006 Matchday 5	Progresul București	1–3	Oțelul Galați	Bucharest
19:30	Drăgan 17'; A. Marcu (yellow card) 81'; M. Ivan (yellow card) 90'	(Report)	Paraschiv 3', 33', 70'; Gado (yellow card) 30'; Mărginean (yellow card) 32'; Arhire (yellow card) 77'; Semeghin (yellow card) 88'	Stadium: Cotroceni; Attendance: Marian Salomir; Referee: 1,000

9 September 2006 Matchday 6	Oțelul Galați	2–0	Pandurii Târgu Jiu	Galați
17:00	Stan 8'; Tănase 17'; Brujan (yellow card) 28'; Mărginean (yellow card) 72'		Mândrean (yellow card) 87'	Stadium: Oțelul; Attendance: 4,000; Referee: Sorin Corpodean

16 September 2006 Matchday 7	Jiul Petroşani	1–2	Oțelul Galați	Petroşani
17:00	Ilie 2'; Constantinescu (yellow card) 8'; Pâcleşan (yellow card) 25'; Dinu (yellow card) 32'		Paraschiv (yellow card) 19'; Stan 31'; Gado 41'; Semeghin (yellow card) 60'	Stadium: Jiul; Attendance: 2,000; Referee: Augustus Constantin

20 September 2006 Matchday 8	Oțelul Galați	1–0	FC Timișoara	Galați
17:00	Mărginean (yellow card) 36'; McKain 49' (o.g.); Paraschiv (yellow card) 71'; Tănase (yellow card) 80'; Lazăr (yellow card) 86'; Baciu (yellow card) 90'		Grigorie (yellow card) 26' (red card) 44'; Alexa (yellow card) 30'; Bălace (yellow card) 32'; Izvoranu (yellow card) 47'; Oprea (yellow card) 90'; Mehmedović (yellow card) 90+2'	Stadium: Oțelul; Attendance: 6,000; Referee: Alexandru Tudor

23 September 2006 Matchday 9	Universitatea Craiova	0–2	Oțelul Galați	Craiova
20:00			Lazăr (yellow card) 18'; Costin (yellow card) 61', (goal) 64'; Nogo (yellow card) 62'; Paraschiv 90+1'	Stadium: Ion Oblemenco; Attendance: 1,000; Referee: Alexandru Deaconu

30 September 2006 Matchday 10	Oțelul Galați	2–1	UTA Arad	Galați
17:00	Jula 12'; Gado 65'; Brujan (yellow card) 74'; Vâtcă (yellow card) 89'		Simion (yellow card) 75'; Vasiljević (yellow card) 76'; Ilie 85'	Stadium: Oțelul; Attendance: 6,000; Referee: Robert Dumitru

15 October 2006 Matchday 11	SC Vaslui	3–1	Oțelul Galați	Vaslui
15:00	Frunză 22', 32', 73'; Madžar (yellow card) 34'		Bădescu (yellow card) 26'; Bălţoi (yellow card) 49'; Paraschiv 84'	Stadium: Municipal (Vaslui); Attendance: 5,000; Referee: Sorin Corpodean

22 October 2006 Matchday 12	Oțelul Galați	2–1	Steaua București	Galați
15:00	Gado (yellow card) 22'; Semeghin (yellow card) 23'; Baciu 53', (yellow card) 84'; Jula 82'		Marin (yellow card) 29'; Théréau 58'; Cernea (yellow card) 70'; Opriţa (yellow card) 73'	Stadium: Oțelul; Attendance: 8,000; Referee: Augustus Constantin

29 October 2006 Matchday 13	FC Argeş	3–1	Oțelul Galați	Piteşti
14:30	Prepeliţă 33'; Rednic 47'; Iordache (yellow card) 63'; Tănasă 90+1'		Nogo (yellow card) 54'; Jula 81'	Stadium: Nicolae Dobrin; Referee: Alexandru Deaconu

5 November 2006 Matchday 14	Oțelul Galați	0–7	Rapid București	Galați
14:00	Mărginean (yellow card) 24'; Nogo (yellow card) 30'; Semeghin (yellow card) 36'		Zicu 36', 77'; Grigore 41'; Buga (yellow card) 41', (goal) 64'; Mazilu 45', 57'; Bădoi 59'	Stadium: Oțelul; Attendance: 6,000; Referee: Sorin Corpodean

11 November 2006 Matchday 15	Dinamo București	3–0	Oțelul Galați	Bucharest
20:45	Cristea 16'; Niculescu 62'; Radu (yellow card) 76'; Dănciulescu 90'		Crăciun (yellow card) 19'; Baciu (red card) 71'	Stadium: Dinamo; Attendance: 3,500; Referee: Sebastian Coltescu

17 November 2006 Matchday 16	Oțelul Galați	1–1	Gloria Bistriţa	Galați
14:00	Gado (yellow card) 16'; Jula 45+1'; Tişmănaru (yellow card) 90+4'		Pădureţu (yellow card) 22'; Mărginean (yellow card) 65'; Băd 85'	Stadium: Oțelul; Attendance: 2,500; Referee: Teodor Craciunescu

24 November 2006 Matchday 17	Politehnica Iaşi	1–1	Oțelul Galați	Iaşi
18:00	Cernoch 90'; Tincu (yellow card) 90'		Brujan (yellow card) 65'; Jula 66'; Baciu (yellow card) 69'; Vâtcă (yellow card) 87'	Stadium: Emil Alexandrescu; Attendance: 4,000; Referee: Andrei Ionita

3 December 2006 Matchday 18	CFR Cluj	2–1	Oțelul Galați	Cluj-Napoca
13:00	Anca 38'; Semedo (yellow card) 43', (goal) 35'; V. Jula (yellow card) 86'		Crăciun (yellow card) 16'; Tănase (yellow card) 20'; Gado (yellow card) 45'; E. Jula 87' (pen.)	Stadium: Dr. Constantin Rădulescu; Attendance: 3,000; Referee: Augustus Constantin

9 December 2006 Matchday 19	Oțelul Galați	0–0	Farul Constanţa	Galați
13:00			Băcilă (yellow card) 36'; Barbu (yellow card) 50'; Şchiopu (yellow card) 52'; Disney (yellow card) 81'	Stadium: Oțelul; Attendance: 2,000; Referee: Orlando Trandu

23 February 2007 Matchday 20	Oțelul Galați	3–2	Unirea Urziceni	Galați
14:00	Baciu 46'; Jula 72' (pen.); Paraschiv 82'; Tănase (yellow card) 86'		Munteanu 52' (pen.); Constantin 64'; Nicu (red card) 6'	Stadium: Oțelul; Attendance: 3,500; Referee: Marian Salomir

4 March 2007 Matchday 21	Ceahlăul Piatra Neamţ	4–3	Oțelul Galați	Piatra Neamţ
20:45	Murgan 5'; Rusmir 30'; Vrăjitoarea 33', (yellow card) 43'; Ilie 42' (pen.)		Labukas 3', (yellow card) 13'; Nohai 13' (o.g.); Kim (yellow card) 29', (goal) 71'	Stadium: Ceahlăul; Attendance: 2,000; Referee: Ionica Serea

9 March 2007 Matchday 22	Oțelul Galați	5–2	Progresul București	Galați
15:30	Stan 12', 14', 27'; Székely 43'; Kim 44'; Grybauskas (yellow card) 75'		Iancu (yellow card) 13'; Chihaia 41', (yellow card) 68'; Herea 51'	Stadium: Oțelul; Attendance: 8,000; Referee: Victor Berbecaru

16 March 2007 Matchday 23	Pandurii Târgu Jiu	2–1	Oțelul Galați	Târgu Jiu
15:30	Chibulcutean (yellow card) 17'; Vătavu (yellow card) 30'; Păcurar 61', (yellow card) 63'; Mihai 71'		Giurgiu (yellow card) 25'; Labukas (yellow card) 43', (goal) 49'; Kim (yellow card) 54'	Stadium: Tudor Vladimirescu; Attendance: 5,000; Referee: Sorin Corpodean

31 March 2007 Matchday 24	Oțelul Galați	2–1	Jiul Petroşani	Galați
16:00	Stan (yellow card) 36', (goal) 57'; Giurgiu (yellow card) 72'; Boghiu 89'		Apetrei 64'; Petrescu (yellow card) 42'; Voicu (yellow card) 55'	Stadium: Oțelul; Attendance: 8,000; Referee: Marius Avram

6 April 2007 Matchday 25	FC Timișoara	1–0	Oțelul Galați	Timișoara
18:00	Bucur 19'; Grigorie (yellow card) 24'; Zimmermann (yellow card) 89'		Nogo (yellow card) 48'	Stadium: Dan Păltinişanu; Attendance: 4,000; Referee: Stefan Erdei

14 April 2007 Matchday 26	Oțelul Galați	4–1	Universitatea Craiova	Galați
17:00	Székely 2', (yellow card) 22'; Paraschiv 27'; Stan 45'; Gado (yellow card) 66'; Dina 90+1' (o.g.)		Mitchell (yellow card) 39'; Dănănae (yellow card) 41'; Pârvu (yellow card) 49'; N'Jock 55'; Wobay (yellow card) 60'; Gârlă (yellow card) 70'	Stadium: Oțelul; Attendance: 8,000; Referee: Augustus Constantin

22 April 2007 Matchday 27	UTA Arad	1–1	Oțelul Galați	Arad
15:30	Simão (yellow card) 26'; Edson 70', (yellow card) 71'; Paşcovici (yellow card) 30'; Simion (yellow card) 44'		Nogo (yellow card) 54'; Dănălache 78' (o.g.)	Stadium: Francisc von Neumann; Attendance: 4,000; Referee: Viorel Sandu

25 April 2007 Matchday 28	Oțelul Galați	2–0	SC Vaslui	Galați
17:00	Nogo 26'; Labukas 58'; Semeghin (yellow card) 66'; Gado (yellow card) 83'		Moraru (yellow card) 12' (yellow-red card) 69'; Buhuş (yellow card) 79'	Stadium: Oțelul; Attendance: 8,000; Referee: Alexandru Deaconu

29 April 2007 Matchday 29	Steaua București	3–0	Oțelul Galați	Bucharest
20:00	Badea 41'; Iacob 51'; Goian (yellow card) 66'; Ochiroşii 90+2'		Tănase (yellow card) 74'	Stadium: Steaua; Attendance: 0 (closed doors); Referee: Cristian Balaj

5 May 2007 Matchday 30	Oțelul Galați	5–1	FC Argeş	Galați
17:00	Jula 10', 14', 22'; Stan 41'; Chița 45' (o.g.)		Schumacher 25' (pen.)	Stadium: Oțelul; Attendance: 7,000; Referee: Andrei Ionita

9 May 2007 Matchday 31	Rapid București	3–3	Oțelul Galați	Bucharest
18:00	Semeghin 6' (o.g.); Grigore 9'; Maftei (yellow card) 9'; R. Stancu (yellow card) 80' (yellow-red card) 86'; Zicu 83'		Labukas (yellow card) 30', (goal) 36'; Jula 38' (pen.), 88'; Székely (yellow card) 81'; Stan (yellow card) 85'; Kim (yellow card) 86'	Stadium: Giuleşti – Valentin Stănescu; Attendance: 0 (closed doors); Referee: Tiberiu Lajos

12 May 2007 Matchday 32	Oțelul Galați	2–1	Dinamo București	Galați
16:30	Gado (yellow card) 1'; Jula 15', 65'; Sârghi (yellow card) 17'; Nogo (yellow card) 42'; Labukas (yellow card) 51'; Semeghin (yellow card) 90+1'		Dănciulescu 2', (yellow card) 2'; Bălace (yellow card) 45'; Pulhac (yellow card) 73'; Blay (yellow card) 90+3'	Stadium: Oțelul; Attendance: 12,000; Referee: Augustus Constantin

18 May 2007 Matchday 33	Gloria Bistriţa	1–2	Oțelul Galați	Bistriţa
18:00	Florea 77'; Mureşan (yellow card) 90+3'		Kim (yellow card) 36'; Tănase 38'; Vâtcă (yellow card) 70'; Stan 82'	Stadium: Gloria; Attendance: 2,000; Referee: Alexandru Deaconu

23 May 2007 Matchday 34	Oțelul Galați	3–1	Politehnica Iaşi	Galați
17:00	Székely 20'; Stan 36'; Tănase 40'; Semeghin (red card) 43'		Pălimaru 88'	Stadium: Oțelul; Attendance: 6,000; Referee: Ovidiu Hategan

=== Cupa României ===
25 October 2006 Round of 32	Corvinul Hunedoara	1–5	Oțelul Galați	Târgovişte
14:00	Ciunt 109'		Elek 93', 114'; Lazăr 99', 120'; Crăciun 116'	Stadium: Eugen Popescu; Attendance: 300; Referee: Teodor Crăciunescu

8 November 2006 Round of 16	FC Unirea	1–2	Oțelul Galați	Focşani
13:00	Balauru (yellow card) 78'; Dobre 79'		Lazăr (yellow card) 6'; Jula 54'; Mărginean (yellow card) 77'; Paraschiv 85'	Stadium: Milcovul; Attendance: 3,000; Referee: Ionică Serea

1 March 2007 Quarter-finals	Steaua București	3–3 (a.e.t.) (5–4 p)	Oțelul Galați	Constanţa
20:45	Neşu (yellow card) 28'; Nicoliţă 62'; Boştină 78' (pen.); Goian (yellow card) 90'; Petre 108'		Kim 21', (yellow card) 79'; Stan 90' (pen.); Boghiu 104'	Stadium: Farul; Attendance: 8,000; Referee: Cristian Balaj
	Penalties
	Boştină (penalty scored); Nicoliţă (penalty scored); Coman (penalty scored); Badea (penalty scored); Théréau (penalty scored)		(penalty scored) Stan; (penalty scored) Paraschiv; (penalty missed) Gado; (penalty scored) Boghiu; (penalty scored) Székely

== Players ==
=== Squad statistics ===
				Total			Liga I		Cupa României	
No.	Pos.	Nat.	Name	Sts	App	Gls	App	Gls	App	Gls
0	MF	(Romania)	Arhire	1	7		6		1	
0	CB	(Romania)	Baciu	23	23	2	21	2	2	
0	MF	(Romania)	Bădescu	5	18		16		2	
0	FW	(Romania)	Bălţoi	4	7		6		1	
0	FW	(Romania)	Bănaru		4		4			
0	CF	(Moldova)	Boghiu	2	12	2	11	1	1	1
0	GK	(Romania)	Borş	1	1				1	
0	MF	(Romania)	Brujan	16	17		17			
0	FB	(Romania)	Cârjă	1	2		1		1	
0	CB	(Romania)	Costin	23	25	2	24	2	1	
0	MF	(Romania)	Crăciun	6	16	1	13		3	1
0	FW	(Romania)	Elek	3	8	2	7		1	2
0	RM/RB	(Romania)	Gado	31	33	3	31	3	2	
0	DM	(Romania)	Giurgiu	15	16		15		1	
0	GK	(Lithuania)	Grybauskas	1	1		1			
0	FW	(Romania)	Jula	26	34	15	32	14	2	1
0	WI	(South Korea)	Kim	10	14	3	13	2	1	1
0	CF	(Lithuania)	Labukas	11	15	4	14	4	1	
0	DF	(Romania)	Lazăr	9	12	2	10		2	2
0	MF	(Romania)	Măjer		1				1	
0	MF	(Romania)	Mărginean	18	25		24		1	
0	CB	(Burkina Faso)	Nogo	29	29	1	28	1	1	
0	AM	(Romania)	Paraschiv	32	32	8	30	7	2	1
0	MF	(Romania)	Popa		1				1	
0	CB	(Brazil)	Rancan	2	4		3		1	
0	RB	(Romania)	Sârghi	9	10		10			
0	FB	(Romania)	Semeghin	32	32		30		2	
0	FW	(Romania)	Stan	27	30	12	27	11	3	1
0	RW	(Romania)	Szekely	16	16	3	15	3	1	
0	DF	(Romania)	Şomodean	1	1				1	
0	CM	(Romania)	Tănase	16	27	5	26	5	1	
0	MF	(Romania)	Tişmănaru	1	7		6		1	
0	MF	(Romania)	Tudosă		1				1	
0	GK	(Romania)	Vâtcă	35	35		33		2	

Last updated: 2009-03-08
Source: official website and Viaţa Liberă
Ordered by player name
0 shown as blank

=== Transfers ===
==== In ====
No.	Pos.	Nat.	Name	Age	EU	Moving from	Type	Transfer window	Ends	Transfer fee	Source
–	DF	(Romania)	Lazăr	26	EU	Bihor Oradea	Transfer	Summer		Undisclosed	
–	FW	(Romania)	Bănaru	24	EU	Dunărea Giurgiu	Transfer	Summer		Free	
–	FW	(Romania)	Jula	26	EU	Universitatea Cluj	Transfer	Summer		Undisclosed	
–	MF	(Romania)	Arhire	30	EU	Politehnica Iași	Transfer	Summer		Undisclosed	
–	DF	(Romania)	Semeghin	27	EU	Hapoel Petah Tikva (Israel)	Transfer	Summer		€100,000	
–	GK	(Lithuania)	Grybauskas	22	EU	Ekranas (Lithuania)	Transfer	Winter		Free	
–	MF	(South Korea)	Gil-Sik	28	Non-EU	Jeju United (South Korea)	Transfer	Winter		Undisclosed	
–	FW	(Moldova)	Boghiu	25	EU	Avangard Kursk (Russia)	Transfer	Winter		Undisclosed	
–	MF	(Romania)	Giurgiu	24	EU	Universitatea Cluj	Transfer	Winter		€25,000	
–	MF	(Romania)	Székely	23	EU	Universitatea Cluj	Transfer	Winter		€25,000	
–	FW	(Lithuania)	Labukas	22	EU	Žalgiris (Lithuania)	Transfer	Winter		Undisclosed	
-	MF	(Romania)	Lörincz	21	EU	Gloria Bistrița	Transfer	Winter		Undisclosed	

==== Out ====
No.	Pos.	Nat.	Name	Age	EU	Moving to	Type	Transfer window	Transfer fee	Source
–	GK	(Romania)	Barbu	35	EU		Contract expired	Summer	–	
–	GK	(Romania)	Stelea	38	EU		Contract expired	Summer	–	
–	MF	(Romania)	Apostol	25	EU	Farul Constanța	Loan end	Summer	–	
–	DF	(Romania)	Ghidarcea	27	EU	Brăila	Loan	Summer	–	
–	MF	(Romania)	Macare	20	EU	Brăila	Loan	Summer	–	
–	MF	(Romania)	Gârleanu	17	EU	Brăila	Loan	Summer	–	
–	MF	(Romania)	Arhire	30	EU		Released	Summer	–	
–	FW	(Romania)	Bălţoi	24	EU		Released	Winter	–	
–	GK	(Romania)	Iorga	26	EU	Brăila	Loan	Winter	–	
–	DF	(Brazil)	Rancan	25	Non-EU	Brăila	Loan	Winter	–	
–	DF	(Romania)	Crişan	?	EU	Brăila	Loan	Winter	–	
–	MF	(Romania)	Tişmănaru	19	EU	Brăila	Loan	Winter	–	
–	FW	(Romania)	Elek	18	EU	Brăila	Loan	Winter	–	
–	FW	(Romania)	Bănaru	24	EU	Brăila	Loan	Winter	–	
-	MF	(Romania)	Cristofan	21	EU	Brăila	Transfer	Winter	-	

EU = if holds or not a European Union passport; Country: when 2 flags, 1st flag = country that plays for internationally, 2nd flag = country of birth; N = number on jersey; P = Position (for position name, pause mouse pointer on abbreviation); Name = Name on jersey (for more extensive name, pause mouse pointer on name); Age = age on the day of the signing; Moving from = only indicate the club the player was playing before start playing for this club in this season, for the type of the moving see Status column; Moving to = only indicates the club the player is going to play next, for the type of the moving see Status column; Ends = when the player's current contract ends; n/a = Not applicable.
