= Ratnikov =

Surname

Ratnikov is a Slavic surname which notable bearers include:

- Daniil Ratnikov (born 1988), Estonian football midfielder.
- Eduard Ratnikov (born 1983), Estonian football midfielder.
- Sergei Ratnikov (born 1959), Estonian retired football midfielder and current manager of Estonian Esiliiga team JK Tallinna Kalev.
