= 2007 UEFA Intertoto Cup =

Tournament details
- Dates: 23 June 2007 – 29 July 2007
- Teams: 50

Final positions
- Champions: (Germany) Hamburg and 10 others (see below)

Tournament statistics
- Matches played: 77
- Goals scored: 197 (2.56 per match)
- Attendance: 406,415 (5,278 per match)

The regions in a map

The 2007 UEFA Intertoto Cup was the 19th and penultimate edition of the competition and took 50 entries. Three rounds were held, and 11 teams qualified for the second qualifying round of the UEFA Cup. The draw took place at UEFA headquarters in Nyon, Switzerland on 23 April 2007. The overall champion was Hamburg after they progressed further than the other Intertoto sides in the UEFA Cup.

== First round ==
The first legs were held on 23 and 24 June 2007, while the second legs were held on 30 June and 1 July 2007.

Team 1	Agg.	Team 2	1st leg	2nd leg
Southern-Mediterranean region
Gloria Bistriţa^{1} (Romania)	3–2	(Montenegro) Grbalj	2–1	1–1^{2}
Zagreb (Croatia)	2–2(a)	(Albania) Vllaznia	2–1	0–1
Ethnikos Achnas (Cyprus)	1–2	(North Macedonia) Makedonija GP	1–0	0–2^{3}
Birkirkara (Malta)	1–5	(Slovenia) Maribor	0–3	1–2
Sant Julià^{1} (Andorra)	4–6	(Bosnia and Herzegovina) Slavija Istočno Sarajevo	2–3	2–3^{4}
Central-East region
Tobol (Kazakhstan)	3–2	(Georgia (country)) Zestaponi	3–0	0–2
Shakhtyor Soligorsk (Belarus)	4–3	(Armenia) Ararat Yerevan	4–1	0–2
Baku (Azerbaijan)	2–2(1–3p)	(Moldova) Dacia Chișinău	1–1	1–1
Differdange (Luxembourg)	0–5	(Slovakia) Slovan Bratislava	0–2	0–3
Northern region
Cliftonville (Northern Ireland)	2–1	(Latvia) Dinaburg	1–1^{5}	1–0
Hammarby (Sweden)	3–1	(Faroe Islands) Klaksvík	1–0^{6}	2–1
Honka (Finland)	4–2	(Estonia) TVMK	0–0	4–2
Valur (Iceland)	1–2	(Republic of Ireland) Cork City	0–2	1–0
Vėtra (Lithuania)	(a)6–6	(Wales) Llanelli	3–1	3–5^{7}

=== First leg ===
24 June 2007

Gloria Bistriţa (Romania)	2–1	(Montenegro) Grbalj
Zaharia 3'; Băd 88'		Đalac 14'

Stadionul Gloria, Bistrița
Attendance: 1,150
Referee: Thomas Vejlgaard (Denmark)

23 June 2007

Zagreb (Croatia)	2–1	(Albania) Vllaznia
Nadarević 19'; Labudović 63'		Nora 3'

Stadion Kranjčevićeva, Zagreb
Attendance: 1,050
Referee: Kuddusi Müftüoglu (Turkey)

23 June 2007

Ethnikos Achnas (Cyprus)	1–0	(North Macedonia) Makedonija GP
Poyiatzis 6' (pen.)

Dasaki Stadium, Achna
Attendance: 1,000
Referee: Mark Whitby (Wales)

24 June 2007

Birkirkara (Malta)	0–3	(Slovenia) Maribor
		Makriev 40', 47'; Pekič 87'

Hibernians Stadium, Paola
Attendance: 358
Referee: Marcin Borski (Poland)

23 June 2007

Sant Julià (Andorra)	2–3	(Bosnia and Herzegovina) Slavija Istočno Sarajevo
Guerra 64'; Veriz 67'		Varela 23' (o.g.); Jovanović 62'; Spalević 87'

Estadi Comunal d'Andorra la Vella, Andorra la Vella
Attendance: 350
Referee: Christopher Lautier (Malta)

23 June 2007

Tobol (Kazakhstan)	3–0	(Georgia (country)) Zestaponi
Zhumaskaliyev 61'; Baltiev 63'; Bakayev 73'

Kostanay Central Stadium, Kostanay
Attendance: 6,000
Referee: Matej Jug (Slovenia)

23 June 2007

Shakhtyor Soligorsk (Belarus)	4–1	(Armenia) Ararat Yerevan
Rios 22'; Hukayla 58'; Klimenka 69'; Nikifarenka 80'		Marcos 41'

Stroitel Stadium, Salihorsk
Attendance: 2,830
Referee: Akmalkhan Kholmatov (Kazakhstan)

23 June 2007

Baku (Azerbaijan)	1–1	(Moldova) Dacia Chișinău
Andronik 80' (o.g.)		Onila 45'

Tofiq Bahramov Republican Stadium, Baku
Attendance: 2,500
Referee: Ferenc Bede (Hungary)

23 June 2007

Differdange (Luxembourg)	0–2	(Slovakia) Slovan Bratislava
		Poliaček 32'; Sedlák 86'

Stade de la Frontière, Esch-sur-Alzette
Attendance: 1,100
Referee: Draženko Kovačić (Croatia)

23 June 2007

Cliftonville (Northern Ireland)	1–1	(Latvia) Dinaburg
O'Connor 40'		Sokolovs 20'

Windsor Park, Belfast^{5}
Attendance: 1,050
Referee: Aleksandar Stavrev (Macedonia)

23 June 2007

Hammarby (Sweden)	1–0	(Faroe Islands) Klaksvík
Davies 3'

Råsunda Stadium, Solna^{6}
Attendance: 1,633
Referee: Valery Vyalichka (Belarus)

24 June 2007

Honka (Finland)	0–0	(Estonia) TVMK

Pohjola Stadion, Vantaa
Attendance: 2,500
Referee: Tsvetan Georgiev (Bulgaria)

23 June 2007

Valur (Iceland)	0–2	(Republic of Ireland) Cork City
		O'Brien 7'; Kearney 66'

Laugardalsvöllur, Reykjavík
Attendance: 980
Referee: Aleksandr Gonchar (Russia)

24 June 2007

Vėtra (Lithuania)	3–1	(Wales) Llanelli
Šernas 56'; Stankevičius 71' (pen.); Milošeski 87'		Mumford 52'

Vetros Stadium, Vilnius
Attendance: 1,600
Referee: Petur Reinert (Faroe Islands)

=== Second leg ===
30 June 2007

Grbalj (Montenegro)	1–1	(Romania) Gloria Bistriţa
Đalac 44'		Coroian 42'

Stadion Pod Goricom, Podgorica^{1}
Attendance: 1,720
Referee: Peter Vervecken (Bulgaria)

Gloria Bistriţa won 3–2 on aggregate.

30 June 2007

Vllaznia (Albania)	1–0	(Croatia) Zagreb
Nora 26'

Loro Boriçi Stadium, Shkodër
Attendance: 5,820
Referee: Joseph Attard (Malta)

2–2 on aggregate, Vllaznia won on away goals rule.

30 June 2007

Makedonija GP (North Macedonia)	2–0	(Cyprus) Ethnikos Achnas
Stojanovski 13', 65'

Gradski Stadion, Skopje^{3}
Attendance: 703
Referee: Meir Levi (Israel)

Makedonija GP won 2–1 on aggregate.

30 June 2007

Maribor (Slovenia)	2–1	(Malta) Birkirkara
Mezga 55'; Vračko 78'		M. Galea 57'

Ljudski vrt, Maribor
Attendance: 1,500
Referee: Sokol Jareci (Albania)

Maribor won 5–1 on aggregate.

30 June 2007

Slavija Istočno Sarajevo (Bosnia and Herzegovina)	3–2	(Andorra) Sant Julià
Jamina 20'; Vuksanović 65', 90+'		Varela 71'; Romero 88' (pen.)

Asim Ferhatović Hase Stadium, Sarajevo^{4}
Attendance: 800
Referee: Lasha Silagava (Georgia)

Slavija Istočno Sarajevo won 6–4 on aggregate.

30 June 2007

Zestaponi (Georgia (country))	2–0	(Kazakhstan) Tobol
Sajaia 3'; Chkhetiani 37'

Mikheil Meskhi Stadium, Tbilisi
Attendance: 500
Referee: Vlado Svilokos (Croatia)

Tobol won 3–2 on aggregate.

1 July 2007

Ararat Yerevan (Armenia)	2–0	(Belarus) Shakhtyor Soligorsk
N. Erzrumyan 32'; Marcos 54'

Vazgen Sargsyan Republican Stadium, Yerevan
Attendance: 4,000
Referee: Dragomir Stanković (Serbia)

Shakhtyor Soligorsk won 4–3 on aggregate.

30 June 2007

Dacia Chișinău (Moldova)	1–1 (a.e.t.)	(Azerbaijan) Baku
Onila 8'		Mujiri 61'
Penalties
Lipa (penalty scored); Orbu (penalty missed); Bolohan (penalty missed); Gușilă (penalty scored); Andronik (penalty scored)	3–1	(penalty missed) Nikolov; (penalty scored) Musayev; (penalty missed) Huseynov; (penalty missed) Amirbekov

Zimbru Stadium, Chișinău
Attendance: 2,000
Referee: Leontios Trattou (Cyprus)

2–2 on aggregate, Dacia Chișinău won on penalty kicks.

30 June 2007

Slovan Bratislava (Slovakia)	3–0	(Luxembourg) Differdange
Meszároš 4'; Masaryk 56'; Sylvestr 78'

Tehelné pole, Bratislava
Attendance: 2,400
Referee: Arman Amirkhanyan (Armenia)

Slovan Bratislava won 5–0 on aggregate.

1 July 2007

Dinaburg (Latvia)	0–1	(Northern Ireland) Cliftonville
		M. Holland 7'

Celtnieks Stadium, Daugavpils
Attendance: 1,000
Referee: Luc Wilmes (Luxembourg)

Cliftonville won 2–1 on aggregate.

30 June 2007

Klaksvík (Faroe Islands)	1–2	(Sweden) Hammarby
Ennigarð 38'		Jacobsen 34' (o.g.); Paulinho 58' (pen.)

Svangaskarð, Toftir
Attendance: 700
Referee: Audrius Žuta (Lithuania)

Hammarby won 3–1 on aggregate.

1 July 2007

TVMK (Estonia)	2–4	(Finland) Honka
Terehhov 68'; Konsa 88'		Huuhtanen 6'; Puustinen 69', 85'; Hakanpää 75'

A. Le Coq Arena, Tallinn
Attendance: 420
Referee: Rusmir Mrković (Bosnia and Herzegovina)

Honka won 4–2 on aggregate.

30 June 2007

Cork City (Republic of Ireland)	0–1	(Iceland) Valur
		Sigurðsson 20'

Turners Cross, Cork
Attendance: 2,247
Referee: Andriy Shandor (Ukraine)

Cork City won 2–1 on aggregate.

1 July 2007

Llanelli (Wales)	5–3	(Lithuania) Vėtra
Milošeski 17' (o.g.); Thomas 38'; Griffiths 54', 88', 90' (pen.)		Lima 4'; Stankevičius 43'; Juška 45'

Richmond Park, Carmarthen^{7}
Attendance: 500
Referee: Magnús Thórisson (Iceland)

6–6 on aggregate, Vėtra advanced on away goals rule.

^{1} Following Scotland and Norway's withdrawals, the free places were awarded to Romania and Andorra.
^{2} This match was played at Stadion Pod Goricom in Podgorica because Grbalj's ground in Radanovići does not meet UEFA standards.
^{3} This match was played at Skopje City Stadium in Skopje because Makedonija GP's ground in Skopje does not meet UEFA standards.
^{4} This match was played at Koševo Stadium in Sarajevo because Slavija's ground in Istočno Sarajevo does not meet UEFA standards.
^{5} This match was played at Linfield's Windsor Park in Belfast because Cliftonville's ground does not meet UEFA standards.
^{6} This match was played at Råsunda in Solna because Hammarby's ground does not meet UEFA standards.
^{7} This match was played at Richmond Park in Carmarthen because Llanelli's ground does not meet UEFA standards.

== Second round ==
The first legs were held on 7 and 8 July 2007, while the second legs were held on 14 and 15 July 2007.

Team 1	Agg.	Team 2	1st leg	2nd leg
Southern-Mediterranean region
Slavija Istočno Sarajevo (Bosnia and Herzegovina)	0–3	(Romania) Oțelul Galați	0–0^{1}	0–3
Makedonija GP (North Macedonia)	0–7	(Bulgaria) Cherno More Varna	0–4^{2}	0–3^{3}
Maribor (Slovenia)	2–5	(Serbia) Hajduk Kula	2–0	0–5^{4}
Trabzonspor (Turkey)	10–0	(Albania) Vllaznia	6–0	4–0
Maccabi Haifa (Israel)	2–2(2–3p)	(Romania) Gloria Bistriţa	0–2	2–0(aet)
Central-East region
Dacia Chișinău (Moldova)	(3–0p)1–1	(Switzerland) St. Gallen	0–1	1–0(aet)
Zalaegerszeg (Hungary)	0–5	(Russia) Rubin Kazan	0–3	0–2
Rapid Wien (Austria)	3–2	(Slovakia) Slovan Bratislava	3–1	0–1
Chornomorets Odesa (Ukraine)	6–2	(Belarus) Shakhtyor Soligorsk	4–2	2–0
Tobol (Kazakhstan)	3–1	(Czech Republic) Slovan Liberec	1–1	2–0
Northern region
Honka (Finland)	3–3 (a)	(Denmark) AaB	2–2^{5}	1–1
Vėtra (Lithuania)	3–0^{6}	(Poland) Legia Warszawa	3–0 (Awarded)	(w/o)
Gent (Belgium)	6–0	(Northern Ireland) Cliftonville	2–0	4–0^{7}
Cork City (Republic of Ireland)	1–2	(Sweden) Hammarby	1–1	0–1^{8}

=== First leg ===
7 July 2007

Slavija Istočno Sarajevo (Bosnia and Herzegovina)	0–0	(Romania) Oțelul Galați

Asim Ferhatović Hase Stadium, Sarajevo^{1}
Attendance: 1,000
Referee: Sascha Kever (Switzerland)

7 July 2007

Makedonija GP (North Macedonia)	0–4	(Bulgaria) Cherno More Varna
		Bachev 53'; Marcos 72', 73'; Stoyanov 82'

Gradski Stadion, Skopje^{2}
Attendance: 2,000
Referee: Alfonso Pérez Burrull (Spain)

7 July 2007

Maribor (Slovenia)	2–0	(Serbia) Hajduk Kula
Makriev 29'; Samardžić 51'

Ljudski vrt, Maribor
Attendance: 2,500
Referee: István Vad (Hungary)

8 July 2007

Trabzonspor (Turkey)	6–0	(Albania) Vllaznia
Ersen 12', 58'; Ceyhun 32'; Çağdaş 39'; Serkan 51'; Riza 89'

Hüseyin Avni Aker Stadium, Trabzon
Attendance: 12,158
Referee: Bas Nijhuis (Netherlands)

7 July 2007

Maccabi Haifa (Israel)	0–2	(Romania) Gloria Bistriţa
		Tilincă 12'; Zaharia 41'

Kiryat Eliezer Stadium, Haifa
Attendance: 3,000
Referee: Oleh Oriekhov (Ukraine)

7 July 2007

Dacia Chișinău (Moldova)	0–1	(Switzerland) St. Gallen
		Garat 7'

Zimbru Stadium, Chișinău
Attendance: 2,156
Referee: Jiří Jech (Czech Republic)

7 July 2007

Zalaegerszeg (Hungary)	0–3	(Russia) Rubin Kazan
		Volkov 21', 66', 80' (pen.)

ZTE Arena, Zalaegerszeg
Attendance: 4,500
Referee: Robert Schörgenhofer (Austria)

7 July 2007

Rapid Wien (Austria)	3–1	(Slovakia) Slovan Bratislava
Hofmann 31', 53'; Bazina 38'		Slovák 88'

Gerhard Hanappi Stadium, Vienna
Attendance: 12,600
Referee: Veaceslav Banari (Moldova)

7 July 2007

Chornomorets Odesa (Ukraine)	4–2	(Belarus) Shakhtyor Soligorsk
Bugaiov 13', 67', 88'; Venhlynskyi 18'		Rios 14'; Martsinovich 59'

Chornomorets Stadium, Odesa
Attendance: 7,000
Referee: Richard Havrilla (Slovakia)

7 July 2007

Tobol (Kazakhstan)	1–1	(Czech Republic) Slovan Liberec
Baltiev 40'		Nezmar 34'

Kostanay Central Stadium, Kostanay
Attendance: 5,800
Referee: Bernhard Brugger (Austria)

8 July 2007

Honka (Finland)	2–2	(Denmark) AaB
Porokara 8' (pen.); Puustinen 30'		Lindström 1'; Prica 23'

Pohjola Stadion, Vantaa^{5}
Attendance: 3,284
Referee: Willie Collum (Scotland)

8 July 2007

Vėtra (Lithuania)	3–0 (awarded)^{6}	(Poland) Legia Warszawa
Severino 8'; Milošeski 45'

Vetros Stadium, Vilnius
Attendance: 3,400
Referee: Mario Vlk (Slovakia)

FK Vėtra won 3–0 on aggregate.

7 July 2007

Gent (Belgium)	2–0	(Northern Ireland) Cliftonville
Foley 8', 63'

Jules Ottenstadion, Ghent
Attendance: 4,184
Referee: Paulo Paraty (Portugal)

7 July 2007

Cork City (Republic of Ireland)	1–1	(Sweden) Hammarby
O'Donovan 10'		Healy 57' (o.g.)

Turners Cross, Cork
Attendance: 2,134
Referee: Romāns Lajuks (Latvia)

=== Second leg ===
14 July 2007

Oțelul Galați (Romania)	3–0	(Bosnia and Herzegovina) Slavija Istočno Sarajevo
Jula 31', 42'; Paraschiv 70'

Stadionul Oțelul, Galați
Attendance: 3,000
Referee: Fábián Mihály (Hungary)

Oțelul Galați won 3–0 on aggregate.

14 July 2007

Cherno More Varna (Bulgaria)	3–0	(North Macedonia) Makedonija GP
Georgiev 12'; Manolov 46'; Dimov 80'

Naftex Stadium, Burgas^{3}
Attendance: 518
Referee: Joeri Van De Velde (Belgium)

Cherno More Varna won 7–0 on aggregate.

14 July 2007

Hajduk Kula (Serbia)	5–0	(Slovenia) Maribor
Vasiljević 15'; Komazec 30', 67' (pen.); Perić 38'; Radanović 45'

Red Star Stadium, Belgrade^{4}
Referee: David Malcolm (Northern Ireland)

Hajduk Kula won 5–2 on aggregate.

14 July 2007

Vllaznia (Albania)	0–4	(Turkey) Trabzonspor
		Umut 47', 89'; Yattara 49'; Yusuf 52'

Loro Boriçi Stadium, Shkodër
Attendance: 1,500
Referee: Alan Kelly (Republic of Ireland)

Trabzonspor won 10–0 on aggregate.

14 July 2007

Gloria Bistriţa (Romania)	0–2 (a.e.t.)	(Israel) Maccabi Haifa
		Maimon 6'; Hemed 65'
Penalties
Coroian (penalty missed); Sepsi (penalty scored); Toma (penalty scored); Băd (penalty scored)	3–2	(penalty missed) Buzaglo; (penalty scored) Keinan; (penalty missed) Gafney; (penalty scored) Gita; (penalty missed) Refaelov

Stadionul Gloria, Bistrița
Attendance: 2,000
Referee: Novo Panić (Bosnia and Herzegovina)

2–2 on aggregate, Gloria Bistriţa won in penalty shootout.

14 July 2007

St. Gallen (Switzerland)	0–1 (a.e.t.)	(Moldova) Dacia Chișinău
		Lipa 56'
Penalties
Aguirre (penalty missed); Gelabert (penalty missed); Garat (penalty missed)	0–3	(penalty scored) Onica; (penalty scored) Călin; (penalty scored) Martin

Espenmoos, St. Gallen
Attendance: 1,977
Referee: Marek Mikołajewski (Poland)

1–1 on aggregate, Dacia Chișinău won in penalty shootout.

14 July 2007

Rubin Kazan (Russia)	2–0	(Hungary) Zalaegerszeg
Volkov 37'; Jean 67'

Central Stadium, Kazan
Attendance: 6,000
Referee: Augustus Constantin (Romania)

Rubin Kazan won 5–0 on aggregate.

14 July 2007

Slovan Bratislava (Slovakia)	1–0	(Austria) Rapid Wien
Dobrotka 18'

Tehelné pole, Bratislava
Attendance: 6,685
Referee: Stanislav Todorov (Bulgaria)

Rapid Wien won 3–2 on aggregate.

15 July 2007

Shakhtyor Soligorsk (Belarus)	0–2	(Ukraine) Chornomorets Odesa
		Poltavets 27' (pen.); Hryshko 64'

Stroitel Stadium, Salihorsk
Attendance: 3,150
Referee: Emil Laursen (Denmark)

Chornomorets Odesa won 6–2 on aggregate.

15 July 2007

Slovan Liberec (Czech Republic)	0–2	(Kazakhstan) Tobol
		Zhumaskaliyev 16'; Ostapenko 35'

Stadion u Nisy, Liberec
Attendance: 5,125
Referee: Mikko Vuorela (Finland)

Tobol won 3–1 on aggregate.

14 July 2007

AaB (Denmark)	1–1	(Finland) Honka
Nomvethe 61'		Porokara 50'

Aalborg Stadium, Aalborg
Attendance: 2,114
Referee: Dejan Filipović (Serbia)

3–3 on aggregate, AaB won on away goals rule.

14 July 2007

Cliftonville (Northern Ireland)	0–4	(Belgium) Gent
		Foley 12'; Olufadé 44', 85'; De Beule 45'

Windsor Park, Belfast^{7}
Attendance: 907
Referee: Tomasz Mikulski (Poland)

Gent won 6–0 on aggregate.

14 July 2007

Hammarby (Sweden)	1–0	(Republic of Ireland) Cork City
Andersson 53'

Råsunda Stadium, Solna^{8}
Attendance: 4,045
Referee: Radek Matějek (Czech Republic)

Hammarby won 2–1 on aggregate.

^{1} This match was played at Koševo Stadium in Sarajevo because FK Slavija's ground in Istočno Sarajevo does not meet UEFA standards.
^{2} This match was played at Skopje City Stadium in Skopje because FK Makedonija's ground in Skopje does not meet UEFA standards.
^{3} This match was played at Naftex Stadium in Burgas because PFC Cherno More Varna's ground in Varna doesn't meet UEFA standards.
^{4} This match was played at Marakana in Belgrade because Hajduk's ground in Kula doesn't meet UEFA standards.
^{5} This match was played at Pohjola Stadion in Vantaa because Honka Espoo's ground in Espoo does not meet UEFA standards.
^{6} This match was awarded to Vėtra 3–0 after match was abandoned due to a riot caused by Legia hooligans invading the pitch at the first leg. UEFA has expelled Legia from Intertoto Cup 2007 and banned the club from one future European season should they qualify again within the next five years.
^{7} This match was played at Linfield F.C.'s Windsor Park in Belfast because Cliftonville F.C.'s ground does not meet UEFA standards.
^{8} This match was played at Råsunda in Solna because Hammarby's ground does not meet UEFA standards.

== Third round ==
The first legs were held on 21 and 22 July 2007, while the second legs were held on 28 and 29 July 2007. The eleven winning teams qualified for the second qualifying round of UEFA Cup.

Team 1	Agg.	Team 2	1st leg	2nd leg
Southern-Mediterranean region
Hajduk Kula (Serbia)	2–4	(Portugal) União Leiria	1–0^{1}	1–4(aet)
Cherno More Varna (Bulgaria)	0–2	(Italy) Sampdoria	0–1^{2}	0–1
Gloria Bistriţa (Romania)	2–2(a)	(Spain) Atlético Madrid	2–1	0–1
Oțelul Galați (Romania)	4–2	(Turkey) Trabzonspor	2–1	2–1
Central-East region
Tobol Kostanay (Kazakhstan)	2–0	(Greece) OFI	1–0	1–0
Dacia Chișinău (Moldova)	1–5	(Germany) Hamburg	1–1	0–4
Chornomorets Odesa (Ukraine)	1–3	(France) Lens	0–0	1–3
Rapid Vienna (Austria)	3–1	(Russia) Rubin Kazan	3–1	0–0
Northern region
FK Vėtra (Lithuania)	0–6	(England) Blackburn Rovers	0–2	0–4
Hammarby (Sweden)	(a)1–1	(Netherlands) Utrecht	0–0^{3}	1–1
KAA Gent (Belgium)	2–3	(Denmark) AaB	1–1	1–2

=== First leg ===
22 July 2007

Hajduk Kula (Serbia)	1–0	(Portugal) União Leiria
Perić 42'

Red Star Stadium, Belgrade^{1}
Attendance: 158
Referee: Bülent Yıldırım (Turkey)

21 July 2007

Cherno More Varna (Bulgaria)	0–1	(Italy) Sampdoria
		Lucchini 43'

Naftex Stadium, Burgas^{2}
Attendance: 7,200
Referee: Brage Sandmoen (Norway)

21 July 2007

Gloria Bistriţa (Romania)	2–1	(Spain) Atlético Madrid
Zaharia 8'; Tilincă 39'		Seitaridis 55'

Stadionul Gloria, Bistrița
Attendance: 4,600
Referee: Nicola Rizzoli (Italy)

21 July 2007

Oțelul Galați (Romania)	2–1	(Turkey) Trabzonspor
Stan 28'; Paraschiv 87'		Ersen 83'

Stadionul Oțelul, Galați
Attendance: 5,950
Referee: César Muñiz Fernández (Spain)

22 July 2007

Tobol Kostanay (Kazakhstan)	1–0	(Greece) OFI
Baltiev 29'

Kostanay Central Stadium, Kostanay
Attendance: 8,000
Referee: Damien Ledentu (France)

21 July 2007

Dacia Chișinău (Moldova)	1–1	(Germany) Hamburg
Boicenco 7'		van der Vaart 70' (pen.)

Zimbru Stadium, Chișinău
Attendance: 7,500
Referee: Bruno Paixão (Portugal)

21 July 2007

Chornomorets Odesa (Ukraine)	0–0	(France) Lens

Chornomorets Stadium, Odesa
Attendance: 8,000
Referee: Tommy Skjerven (Norway)

21 July 2007

Rapid Vienna (Austria)	3–1	(Russia) Rubin Kazan
Hofmann 70', 90+3'; Bilić 80' (pen.)		Ryazantsev 30'

Gerhard Hanappi Stadium, Vienna
Attendance: 10,200
Referee: David McKeon (Republic of Ireland)

22 July 2007

FK Vėtra (Lithuania)	0–2	(England) Blackburn Rovers
		McCarthy 29'; Derbyshire 80'

Vetros Stadium, Vilnius
Attendance: 4,200
Referee: Tony Asumaa (Finland)

22 July 2007

Hammarby (Sweden)	0–0	(Netherlands) Utrecht

Råsunda Stadium, Solna^{3}
Attendance: 5,361
Referee: Philippe Kalt (France)

21 July 2007

KAA Gent (Belgium)	1–1	(Denmark) AaB
Olufadé 48' (pen.)		Nomvethe 55'

Jules Ottenstadion, Ghent
Attendance: 5,138
Referee: Jérôme Laperrière (Switzerland)

=== Second leg ===
29 July 2007

União Leiria (Portugal)	4–1 (a.e.t.)	(Serbia) Hajduk Kula
Éder 90+2'; Laranjeiro 97' (pen.), 120' (pen.); Sougou 117'		Bogić 107' (pen.)

Estádio Dr. Magalhães Pessoa, Leiria
Attendance: 1,097
Referee: Fritz Stuchlik (Austria)

União Leiria won 4–2 on aggregate.

28 July 2007

Sampdoria (Italy)	1–0	(Bulgaria) Cherno More Varna
Maggio 90+1'

Stadio Luigi Ferraris, Genoa
Attendance: 20,812
Referee: Björn Kuipers (Netherlands)

Sampdoria won 2–0 on aggregate.

28 July 2007

Atlético Madrid (Spain)	1–0	(Romania) Gloria Bistriţa
Forlán 11'

Vicente Calderón Stadium, Madrid
Attendance: 29,223
Referee: Charlie Richmond (Scotland)

2–2 on aggregate, Atlético Madrid won on away goals rule.

28 July 2007

Trabzonspor (Turkey)	1–2	(Romania) Oțelul Galați
Ceyhun 8'		Székely 12'; Jula 90' (pen.)

Hüseyin Avni Aker Stadium, Trabzon
Attendance: 17,489
Referee: Stanislav Sukhina (Russia)

Oțelul Galați won 4–2 on aggregate.

29 July 2007

OFI (Greece)	0–1	(Kazakhstan) Tobol Kostanay
		Kharabara 86'

Pankritio Stadium, Heraklion
Attendance: 3,008
Referee: Cristian Balaj (Romania)

Tobol Kostanay won 2–0 on aggregate.

29 July 2007

Hamburg (Germany)	4–0	(Moldova) Dacia Chișinău
Kompany 50' van der Vaart 71'; Benjamin 76'; Jarolím 89'

AOL Arena, Hamburg
Attendance: 50,800
Referee: Ivan Bebek (Croatia)

Hamburg won 5–1 on aggregate.

28 July 2007

Lens (France)	3–1	(Ukraine) Chornomorets Odesa
Coulibaly 19'; Akalé 40', 71'		Venhlynskyi 11'

Stade Felix Bollaert, Lens
Attendance: 25,752
Referee: Manuel Gräfe (Germany)

Lens won 3–1 on aggregate.

29 July 2007

Rubin Kazan (Russia)	0–0	(Austria) Rapid Vienna

Central Stadium, Kazan
Attendance: 15,000
Referee: Stefan Johannesson (Sweden)

Rapid Vienna won 3–1 on aggregate.

28 July 2007

Blackburn Rovers (England)	4–0	(Lithuania) FK Vėtra
Pedersen 25'; Roberts 48'; McCarthy 54'; Samba 55'

Ewood Park, Blackburn
Attendance: 11,854
Referee: Michael Weiner (Germany)

Blackburn Rovers won 6–0 on aggregate.

29 July 2007

Utrecht (Netherlands)	1–1	(Sweden) Hammarby
Nelisse 65'		Lidholm 66'

Stadion Galgenwaard, Utrecht
Attendance: 10,200
Referee: Mike Dean (England)

1–1 on aggregate, Hammarby won on away goals rule.

29 July 2007

AaB (Denmark)	2–1	(Belgium) KAA Gent
Califf 30'; Johansson 79'		Olufadé 28'

Aalborg Stadium, Aalborg
Attendance: 3,725
Referee: Sorin Corpodean (Romania)

AaB won 3–2 on aggregate.

^{1} This match was played at Marakana in Belgrade because Hajduk's ground in Kula doesn't meet UEFA standards.
^{2} This match was played at Naftex Stadium in Burgas because Cherno More Varna's ground does not meet UEFA standards.
^{3} This match was played at Råsunda in Solna because Hammarby's ground does not meet UEFA standards.

== Overall winners ==
Nine of the eleven co-winners which entered the UEFA Cup via the Intertoto won their qualifying ties and progressed to the first round proper. Only three of these nine sides survived the first round and entered the group stages, and of those, Hamburg and Atlético Madrid qualified for the knockout stages. Hamburg advanced to the round of 16 by defeating FC Zürich 3–1 on aggregate, while Atlético Madrid lost to Bolton Wanderers 1–0; leaving Hamburg as the only team remaining from this year's competition, being the overall champions of Intertoto Cup. Hamburg was eliminated in the round of 16.

- (Germany) Hamburg (Overall winners) (round of 16, lost to Bayer Leverkusen)
- (Spain) Atlético Madrid (round of 32, lost to Bolton Wanderers)
- (Denmark) AaB (Group stage, fourth in Group G)
- (Italy) Sampdoria (first round, lost to AaB)
- (England) Blackburn Rovers (first round, lost to Larissa)
- (France) Lens (first round, lost to København)
- (Portugal) União Leiria (first round, lost to Bayer Leverkusen)
- (Austria) Rapid Vienna (first round, lost to Anderlecht)
- (Sweden) Hammarby (first round, lost to Sporting Braga)
- (Romania) Oțelul Galați (second qualifying round, lost to Lokomotiv Sofia)
- (Kazakhstan) Tobol Kostanay (second qualifying round, lost to Dyskobolia Grodzisk)

== Top goalscorers ==
Pos	Player	Nationality	Club	Goals
1	Vitali Volkov	Russia	Rubin Kazan	4
1	Ersen Martin	Turkey	Trabzonspor	4
1	Steffen Hofmann	Germany	Rapid Vienna	4
4	Dimitar Makriev	Bulgaria	Maribor	3
4	Rhys Griffiths	Wales	Llanelli	3
4	Jami Puustinen	Finland	Honka Espoo	3
4	Igor Bugaev	Moldova	Chornomorets Odesa	3
4	Dominic Foley	Ireland	KAA Gent	3
4	Dorel Zaharia	Romania	Gloria Bistrita	3
4	Ruslan Baltiev	Kazakhstan	FC Tobol	3
4	Adékambi Olufadé	Togo	KAA Gent	3
4	Gabriel Jula	Romania	Oțelul Galați	3

== See also ==
- 2007–08 UEFA Champions League
- 2007–08 UEFA Cup
