= Salif Nogo =

Burkinabé-French professional footballer (born 1986)

Personal information
- Date of birth: 1 January 1986 (age 40)
- Place of birth: Ouagadougou, Burkina Faso
- Height: 1.90 m (6 ft 3 in)
- Position: Centre back

Youth career
- US Ouagadougou

Senior career*
Years	Team	Apps	(Gls)
2003–2006	US Ouagadougou		
2006–2008	Oțelul Galați	58	(2)
2009	Troyes B	7	(0)
2009	Jiul Petroșani	7	(0)
2010	Politehnica Iași	6	(0)
2010–2012	Astra Ploiești	8	(0)
2010–2012	→ Astra Ploiești II (loan)	9	(0)
2014	Metalul Reșița	7	(1)
2014–2015	Sighetu Marmației		
2015	Metalul Reșița	7	(0)
2016–2017	Luceafărul Oradea	21	(3)
2017	Cetate Deva	5	(0)
2018	Unirea Dej	5	(0)
2018–2022	Lotus Băile Felix	52	(6)
Total		192	(12)

International career^{‡}
2004	Burkina Faso	6	(0)
- * Club domestic league appearances and goals as of 17:49, 7 November 2022 (UTC) ‡ National team caps and goals as of 8 August 2017

Salif Nogo (born 1 January 1986) is a Burkinabé-French former professional footballer who played as a centre back. After starting his career at US Ouagadougou in Burkina Faso, Nogo arrived in Romania in 2006 to play for Oțelul Galați. He then spent the next 16 years competing in all tiers of Romanian football, from Liga I to Liga IV, with clubs from almost every historical region of the country.

== Club career ==
=== US Ouagadougou ===
Nogo was born on 1 January 1986 in Ouagadougou, Burkina Faso. He began playing senior-level football in 2003 at local club, US Ouagadougou, winning with them the Coupe du Faso in 2005.

=== Oțelul Galați ===
In 2006, the 20-year-old went to play for Oțelul Galați, making his Divizia A debut under coach Petre Grigoraș on 11 March 2006 in a 3–0 away win over Dinamo București. In the following season, Nogo appeared regularly for the team, scoring his first league goal when he opened the scoring in a 2–0 win over FC Vaslui. In the 2007–08 season, he scored the winning goal in the 2–1 victory against Universitatea Cluj. He also made his debut in European competitions, helping the club win the 2007 Intertoto Cup after they eliminated Slavija Istočno Sarajevo and Trabzonspor during the campaign. Subsequently, Oțelul qualified to the UEFA Cup second round, where they were defeated 3–1 on aggregate by Lokomotiv Sofia.

=== Troyes ===
In 2008, Nogo signed with French Ligue 2 team, Troyes. However, he did not play for them, making appearances only for the club's fifth-tier satellite team.

=== Return to Romania ===
In September 2009, Nogo returned to Romania, signing with second league side, Jiul Petroșani. In March 2010, Nogo came back to first league football, joining Politehnica Iași. For the 2010–11 season he went to play for Astra Ploiești. On 14 May 2012, Nogo made his last top-division appearance in Astra's 2–1 away victory against Ceahlăul Piatra Neamț which helped his side avoid relegation, totaling 72 appearances with two goals in the competition. Afterwards he went to play for various teams in the Romanian lower leagues until his retirement in 2022.

== International career ==
Nogo earned six caps for Burkina Faso, making his debut on 30 May 2004 under coach Ivica Todorov in a 3–2 friendly victory against Libya. Subsequently, he played in two losses to South Africa and Cape Verde in the 2006 World Cup qualifiers. Nogo's last game for The Stallions took place on 17 November 2004 in a friendly which ended with a 4–0 away loss to Morocco.

== Sports agent career ==
After he ended his playing career, Nogo worked as a sports agent.

== Honours ==
US Ouagadougou

- Coupe du Faso: 2005

Oțelul Galați

- Intertoto Cup: 2007

Lotus Băile Felix

- Liga IV: 2018–19
