= Dejan Milošeski =

Macedonian footballer (born 1982)

Personal information
- Full name: Dejan Milošeski; Дејан Милошевски
- Date of birth: 27 December 1982 (age 43)
- Place of birth: Skopje, Macedonia
- Height: 1.86 m (6 ft 1 in)
- Position: Midfielder

Senior career*
Years	Team	Apps	(Gls)
2003–2006	Cementarnica	55	(7)
2006–2008	Vėtra	71	(15)
2009–2011	Widzew Łódź	19	(1)
2010–2011	→ Górnik Łęczna (loan)	26	(6)
2011–2012	Panachaiki	3	(0)
2012–2013	Kentavros Magoulas		
2013–2015	Olympiakos Savalion		
2015	AO Kyparissias		
2016	Xenofon Krestenon		

International career
2008	Macedonia	1	(0)
- * Club domestic league appearances and goals

Dejan Milošeski (born 27 December 1982 in Skopje) is a Macedonian former professional footballer who played as a midfielder.

== Career ==
=== Club ===
He was released from Widzew Łódź on 2 July 2011 and joined Panachaiki GE on a free transfer shortly after.

In the summer of 2012, he joined Kentavros Magoulas on a free transfer

In July 2013 he joined Olympiakos Savalion, a club that plays in the first division of the local amateur championship of the Elis regional unit.

=== International ===
He made his only appearance for the Macedonia national team in a November 2008 friendly match against Montenegro.

== Honours ==
Widzew Łódź

- I liga: 2008–09, 2009–10
