= Paul Tincu =

Romanian footballer

Personal information
- Full name: Paul Cătălin Tincu
- Date of birth: 26 February 1986 (age 40)
- Place of birth: Iaşi, Romania
- Height: 1.74 m (5 ft 8 1/2 in)
- Position: Midfielder

Youth career
- Noua Generaţie Iaşi

Senior career*
Years	Team	Apps	(Gls)
2004–2010	Politehnica Iaşi	53	(2)
2008–2009	→ Petrolul Ploiești		
2009–2010	→ Botoșani		
2010–2011	Politehnica Iași	9	(1)
2012	Foresta Suceava		
2013–2014	Ştiinţa Miroslava		
2014–2018	FC Romania		
Total		62	(3)

International career
2006–2007	Romania U21	4	(1)
- * Club domestic league appearances and goals

Paul Cătălin Tincu (born 26 February 1986) is a retired Romanian professional footballer who played as a midfielder.

== Club career ==
Tincu started playing football at the Noua Generaţie Iaşi club. He and teammate Clement Pălimaru signed with Liga I club Politehnica Iaşi during the 2004–05 season, after being considered the most promising players from the centre at that time. In the summer of 2010 he moved to Politehnica Iași, again alongside Clement Pălimaru.

== International career ==
Tincu also played for the Romania under-21 football team. He appeared in four games and scored once, against Northern Ireland, in a 2–0 victory.
