= Bojan Jamina =

Bosnia and Herzegovina footballer (1977–2022)

Personal information
- Date of birth: 5 August 1977
- Place of birth: Sarajevo, SR Bosnia and Herzegovina, SFR Yugoslavia
- Date of death: 26 December 2022 (aged 45)
- Place of death: Istočno Sarajevo, Republika Srpska, Bosnia and Herzegovina
- Position: Midfielder

Senior career*
Years	Team	Apps	(Gls)
1997	Željezničar Sarajevo	0	(0)
1998	Zvezdara		
1998–2000	Slavija Sarajevo		
2000–2001	OFK Beograd	0	(0)
2001–2002	Olimpija Ljubljana	0	(0)
2001–2002	→ Triglav 2000 (loan)	20	(5)
2002–2003	Kozara Gradiška		
2003–2004	Slavija Sarajevo		
2004–2005	Čelik Zenica	20	(1)
2005–2006	Famos Vojkovići		
2006–2011	Slavija Sarajevo	57	(1)

International career
- Bosnia and Herzegovina U-21
- * Club domestic league appearances and goals

Bojan Jamina (Serbian Cyrillic: Бојан Jaминa; 5 August 1977 – 26 December 2022) was a football midfielder from Bosnia and Herzegovina.

== Club career ==
Of Serbian ancestry, Jamina was born in Sarajevo, SR Bosnia and Herzegovina, at the time still part of former Yugoslavia. Besides FK Slavija, where he spent most of his career, he has also played with Bosnian clubs FK Željezničar Sarajevo, FK Kozara Gradiška and NK Čelik Zenica, and also in Serbia, first with FK Zvezdara from where he left in 1998, and then OFK Beograd, and Slovenia NK Olimpija Ljubljana and ND Triglav Kranj.
