= Eduard Tismănaru =

Romanian footballer

Personal information
- Date of birth: 25 May 1987 (age 39)
- Place of birth: Onești, Romania
- Height: 1.78 m (5 ft 10 in)
- Position: Midfielder

Team information
- Current team: Vulturul Măgirești
- Number: 9

Senior career*
Years	Team	Apps	(Gls)
2004–2006	Petrolul Moineşti	25	(3)
2006–2010	Oțelul Galați	11	(0)
2007	→ CF Brăila (loan)	8	(0)
2007–2008	→ Jiul Petroşani (loan)	27	(8)
2009–2010	→ FCM Bacău (loan)	17	(3)
2010	Onești	?	(?)
2011	FCM Bacău	1	(0)
2011–2012	Aerostar Bacău	?	(?)
2012	CSM Moinești	?	(?)
2014–2015	Aerostar Bacău	?	(?)
2016–2017	Morild	?	(?)
2017–	Vulturul Măgirești	?	(?)
- * Club domestic league appearances and goals as of 2 January 2018

Eduard Tismănaru (born 25 May 1987 in Oneşti, Romania) is a Romanian footballer currently under contract with Liga IV-Bacău County side Vulturul Măgirești.
