= Adrian Ionescu (footballer, born 1985) =

Romanian footballer

Personal information
- Full name: Adrian Mădălin Ionescu
- Date of birth: 13 July 1985 (age 41)
- Place of birth: Slatina, Romania
- Height: 1.78 m (5 ft 10 in)
- Position: Central midfielder

Youth career
- 2003–2004: Nicolae Dobrin School

Senior career*
Years	Team	Apps	(Gls)
2004–2007	FC Argeş	34	(2)
2007–2008	Oțelul Galați	8	(0)
2008–2010	Universitatea Cluj	52	(6)
2010–2013	Delta Tulcea	44	(3)
2013–2014	Universitatea Craiova	19	(1)
2014–2015	Metalul Reșița	14	(0)
2015–2016	Farul Constanța	29	(0)
- * Club domestic league appearances and goals as of 29 May 2016

Adrian Mădălin Ionescu (born 13 July 1985 in Slatina) is a Romanian footballer who plays as a defensive midfielder, but can also take up the role of a central defender.
