= Yusuf Kurtuluş =

Turkish footballer

Personal information
- Full name: Yusuf Kurtuluş
- Date of birth: September 15, 1986 (age 40)
- Place of birth: Trabzon, Turkey
- Height: 1.78 m (5 ft 10 in)
- Position: Midfielder

Youth career
- 2002–2004: Trabzonspor A2

Senior career*
Years	Team	Apps	(Gls)
2004–2008	Trabzonspor		
2005–2007	→ Darıca Gençlerbirliği (loan)		
2008	→ Konyaspor (loan)		
2008–2009	Denizlispor	10	(1)
2009	Giresunspor		
2009–2010	Konyaspor	25	(2)
2010–2011	Kayseri Erciyesspor	15	(0)
2011–2012	Elazığspor		
2012–2013	Adana Demirspor		
2013-2014	Ankaraspur		
2014	Altay SK		
2014-2015	Orduspor		
2015	Tepikspur		
2015-2016	Bayrampaşa		
2016	Bayburt Grup Ol		
2017	Orhangazispor		
2019-2020	K. Yelken		
2020	Inkilap SK		
- * Club domestic league appearances and goals as of 14:37, 17 December 2010 (UTC)

Yusuf Kurtuluş (born 15 September 1986 in Of) is a former Turkish footballer. He last played for Inkilap SK.

== Club career ==
Kurtuluş began playing football in Trabzonspor's famous youth academy and was a vital member in Trabzonspor's 2003-2004 PAF (reserves) championship side. He went on loan for 2 seasons at TFF Second League side Darica Genclerbirligi to gain experience. Yusuf was called back to Trabzonspor in the 2007–08 pre-season camp where he caught the attention of the coaching staff with his talent. His talent was shown in the UEFA Intertoto Cup where he thrilled the fans and media, with his playmaking abilities and by scoring a goal.

Kurtuluş made only one appearance for Trabzonspor in the Süper Lig before he went on loan to Konyaspor in February 2008, and left Trabzonspor on a permanent transfer to Denizlispor in August 2008.
