= Florin Lazăr =

Romanian footballer

Personal information
- Full name: Florin Daniel Lazăr
- Date of birth: 15 January 1980 (age 46)
- Place of birth: Craiova, Romania
- Height: 1.84 m (6 ft 1/2 in)
- Position: Centre back

Youth career
- 1990–1995: CSȘ Craiova

Senior career*
Years	Team	Apps	(Gls)
1996–2000	Dinamo București	2	(0)
1998–1999	→ Rocar București (loan)	13	(0)
1999–2000	→ ARO Câmpulung (loan)	13	(0)
2000–2006	Bihor Oradea	113	(3)
2006	Oțelul Galați	10	(0)
2006–2012	Gaz Metan Mediaș	134	(4)
2012	Brașov	5	(0)
2013–2015	Bihor Oradea	61	(2)
2015–2016	Hidișelu de Sus	?	(?)
2016–2017	Diosig Bihardiószeg	12	(7)
2017	Sânmartin	13	(4)
2018	Crișul Chișineu-Criș	14	(3)
Total		390	(23)
- * Club domestic league appearances and goals as of 2 October 2018

Florin Daniel Lazăr (born 15 January 1980) is a Romanian former football player who played as a centre back.

== Club career ==
Lazăr played at youth level for CSȘ Craiova, a club from his hometown specialized in this sector. Despite the fact that most of local players eventually reached the Craiova's strongest team at that time, FC Universitatea Craiova, he made a big jump to one of the best Romanian football clubs, Dinamo București, for which he made his debut at only 16 years old in a match against Universitatea Cluj. Subsequently, he was loan to Liga II teams as Rocar București or ARO Câmpulung. In 2000 Lazăr signed a contract with Bihor Oradea for which he played in 6 years more than 100 matches succeeding also a historical promotion to the Liga I in 2003. Later he played for teams such as: Oțelul Galați, Gaz Metan Mediaș or Brașov. With Gaz Metan he played in the UEFA Europa League. Lazăr moved back to Bihor Oradea for the last part of his career, being a highly appreciated player by supporters, especially for his style of playing, seriousness and loyalty to the club, also being the captain of the team.

At 35 years old, also due to bankruptcy of FC Bihor, Lazăr left the team, but continued to play for Liga IV teams from Bihor County such as: FC Hidișelu de Sus, CS Diosig or CSC Sânmartin, winning the league with the first two and being on the 1st place with CSC Sânmartin, also, before he transferred to Crișul Chișineu Criș, in January 2018.

== Personal life ==
Born in Craiova, Lazăr had a great time during his career at FC Bihor in the early 2000s, including a historical promotion to the Liga I with the red and blues. He said that he always felt the best in Oradea, settling there.
