= Bertrand Ngapounou =

Cameroonian footballer

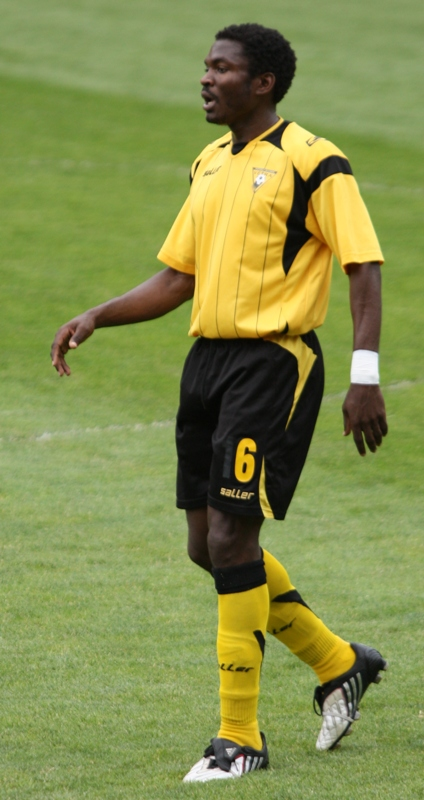

Personal information
- Date of birth: 20 November 1982 (age 43)
- Place of birth: Douala, Cameroon
- Height: 1.88 m (6 ft 2 in)
- Position: Defender

Senior career*
Years	Team	Apps	(Gls)
2000–2002	Sable de Batié		
2003–2004	Rostov	1	(0)
2005	Anzhi Makhachkala	9	(0)
2006–2007	Žalgiris Vilnius	29	(0)
2007–2008	Oțelul Galați	2	(0)
2008	Okzhetpes	9	(1)
2009	Tauras Tauragė	10	(1)
2009	Vėtra Vilnius	9	(1)
2010	Kruoja Pakruojis	12	(1)
Total		81	(4)
- * Club domestic league appearances and goals

Bertrand Ngapounou (born 20 November 1982) is a Cameroonian former football defender.

== Club career ==
Ngapounou played in his native country, Russia, Lithuania, Kazakhstan and Romania. He had a spell with FC Rostov in the Russian Premier League during 2003 and 2004.
