= Paulo Adriano =

Portuguese footballer

Personal information
- Full name: Paulo Adriano Almeida Simões
- Date of birth: 3 March 1977 (age 49)
- Place of birth: Anadia, Portugal
- Height: 1.82 m (6 ft 0 in)
- Position: Midfielder

Youth career
- 1985–1995: Anadia

Senior career*
Years	Team	Apps	(Gls)
1995–1998	Anadia		
1998–2006	Académica	158	(12)
2003–2004	Académica B	15	(5)
2006–2007	AEK Larnaca	13	(1)
2007	Vitoria Guimarães	5	(0)
2007–2009	Brașov	60	(2)
2009	Alania	10	(0)
2009–2013	Anadia	65	(6)
2013–2014	Oliveira Bairro	31	(13)
Total		357	(39)
- * Club domestic league appearances and goals

Paulo Adriano Almeida Simões (born 3 March 1977 in Anadia, Aveiro District), known as Adriano, is a Portuguese former footballer who played as a midfielder. He is best remembered for his long association with Académica de Coimbra, where he served multiple times as club captain.

== Club Career ==
Born in Coimbra, Paulo Adriano progressed through the youth ranks of his hometown club, Anadia Futebol Clube. In his youth career, Paulo Adriano was a key member of the Anadia FC squad that clinched the U-18 Second Division title, a victory that secured the club's historic promotion to the U-18 National League.

He made his professional debut during the 1998/99 season playing for Académica - where he stayed till 2005. In total, he amassed 186 appearances for the club across the top two divisions of Portuguese football.

In 2006, Paulo Adriano moved abroad to join Cypriot First Division side AEK Larnaca FC. His stint in Cyprus was relatively brief; he returned to Portugal where he played for Vitória Guimaraes in 2007, for 5 matches. He then joined Braşov in Romania, where he concluded his professional playing career in 2009.

Adriano then returned to his roots, spending four seasons with Anadia FC and one with Oliveira do Bairro.

== Honours ==
Brașov

- Liga II: 2007–08

Anadia

- Terceira Divisão: 2009–10
