= Ismail Kouha =

Moroccan footballer

Personal information
- Date of birth: 12 April 1983 (age 43)
- Place of birth: Morocco
- Height: 1.91 m (6 ft 3 in)
- Position: Goalkeeper

Senior career*
Years	Team	Apps	(Gls)
2005–2007	Raja Casablanca		
2007–2008	Oțelul Galați	8	(0)
2007–2008	Olympic Safi		
2008–2009	Kawkab Marrakech		
2009–2010	AS Salé		
2010–2011	FUS Rabat		
2011–2012	MAS Fez		
2012–2013	Raja Beni Mellal		
2014–2015	Chabab Houara		
- * Club domestic league appearances and goals

Ismail Kouha (Arabic: اسماعيل كوحا; born 12 April 1983) is a football player from Morocco. He plays as goalkeeper.

== Career ==
Kouha has played for several teams in Moroccan national leagues, especially in the top-tier Botola Pro. In 2007, he spent six months in Romania with Oțelul Galați who paid €150.000 for his transfer, making eight Liga I appearances.
