= Davi Rancan =

Brazilian footballer (born 1981)

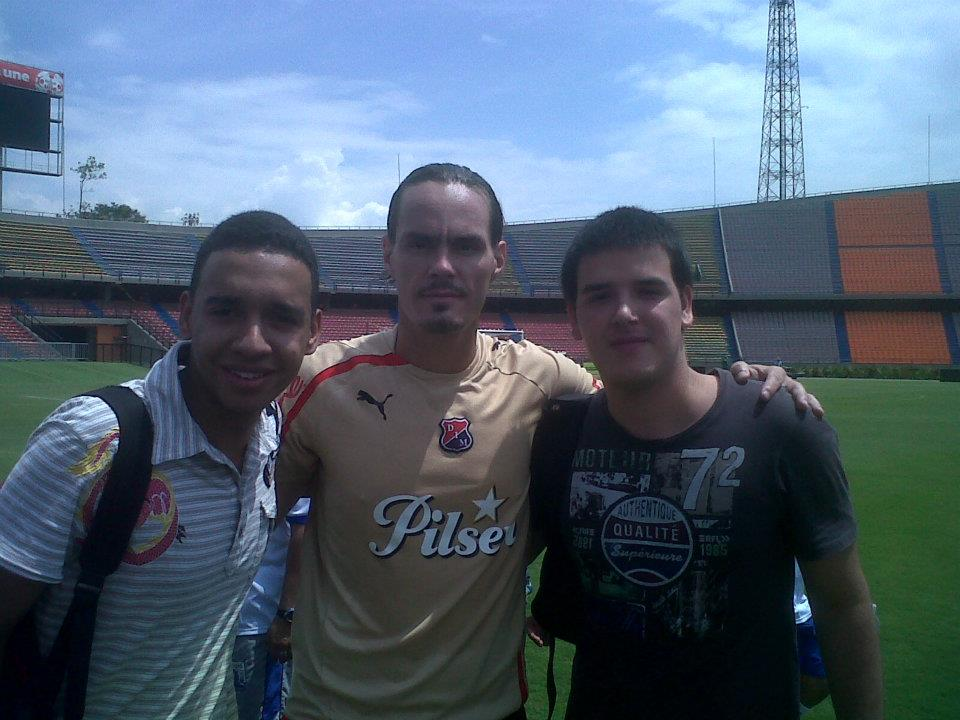

Personal information
- Full name: Davi Alexandre Rancan
- Date of birth: September 22, 1981 (age 45)
- Place of birth: São Paulo, Brazil
- Position: Defender

Senior career*
Years	Team	Apps	(Gls)
2000–2002	Santos		
2004–2005	Portuguesa Santista		
2005	Inter de Limeira		
2005–2008	Oțelul Galați	8	(0)
2007	→ Brăila (loan)	15	(2)
2008–2010	Moroka Swallows	31	(1)
2010–2011	Inter Turku	3	(0)
2011–2012	Independiente Medellín	25	(2)
2013	Penapolense		
Total		82	(5)
- * Club domestic league appearances and goals

Davi Alexandre Rancan (born September 22, 1981) is a Brazilian former footballer.
