= Alin Paleacu =

Romanian footballer

Personal information
- Full name: Alin Vasile Paleacu
- Date of birth: 19 January 1975 (age 51)
- Place of birth: Timișoara, Romania
- Height: 1.75 m (5 ft 9 in)
- Position: Midfielder

Team information
- Current team: ASU Politehnica (youth coach)

Senior career*
Years	Team	Apps	(Gls)
1996–2000	UM Timișoara	59	(4)
2000–2001	CSM Reșița	22	(0)
2001–2002	Minaur Zlatna	23	(4)
2002–2004	Apulum Alba Iulia	66	(16)
2005	Politehnica Timișoara	19	(1)
2006–2007	Jiul Petroșani	36	(5)
2007–2008	Gloria Buzău	25	(3)
2008	Internațional Curtea de Argeș	2	(1)
2008	CFR Timișoara	13	(2)
2009	Amstetten	9	(1)
2009–2010	Săgeata Stejaru	29	(1)
2010–2012	Recaș	?	(?)
2013	Voința Mașloc	?	(?)
2016–2017	CSC Dumbrăvița	?	(?)
Total		303	(38)

Managerial career
- 2011–2012: ACS Recaș (player-assistant)
- 2013: Voința Mașloc (player-assistant)
- 2013: FC Caransebeș
- 2014: Progresul Gătaia
- 2014–2015: FC Caransebeș (assistant)
- 2016–2017: CSC Dumbrăvița (player-assistant)
- 2017–2018: ACS Poli Timişoara (youth)
- 2018: ACS Poli Timişoara (assistant)
- 2018–2019: CSC Dumbrăvița (youth)
- 2019–: ASU Politehnica (youth)
- * Club domestic league appearances and goals as of 12 June 2018

Alin Vasile Paleacu (born 19 January 1975) is a Romanian former professional footballer who played as a midfielder. After 2012 Paleacu started his career as a coach, but also played sporadically for lower division teams.

== Honours ==
UM Timișoara

- Divizia C: 1998–99

Apulum Alba Iulia

- Divizia B: 2002–03

ACS Recaș

- Liga III: 2011–12
