= Clement Pălimaru =

Romanian footballer

Personal information
- Date of birth: 4 February 1986 (age 40)
- Place of birth: Botoșani, Romania
- Height: 1.85 m (6 ft 1 in)
- Position: Forward

Youth career
- –2005: LPS Botoșani

Senior career*
Years	Team	Apps	(Gls)
2004–2010	Politehnica Iaşi	43	(4)
2005	→ Cetatea Suceava (loan)	13	(5)
2008	→ Petrolul Ploieşti (loan)	6	(1)
2009	→ Cetatea Suceava (loan)	10	(1)
2010	Politehnica Iaşi	12	(3)
2011	FC Botoșani	13	(3)
2011–2012	CF Brăila	22	(8)
2012–2013	CS Otopeni	21	(18)
2013–2014	Academica Clinceni	11	(7)
2014	Politehnica Iaşi	18	(10)
2014–2016	Gloria Buzău	29	(16)
Total		198	(76)

International career
2006–2007	Romania U21	6	(1)
- * Club domestic league appearances and goals

Clement Pălimaru (born 4 February 1986) is a Romanian retired professional footballer who played as a forward.

== Club career ==
=== Politehnica Iași ===
Pălimaru started playing football in his hometown, at the LPS Botoșani youth club. During the 2004–05 season, he and teammate Paul Tincu were picked up by Politehnica Iaşi, as they were the most promising players from the centre at that time.

In order to get more playing time, he was loaned to Cetatea Suceava. After 13 matches and five goals scored in the second league (and also two goals against Rapid București in the Romanian Cup; Cetatea lost the match 3–2), he was called back to Politehnica, at that time in shortage of forwards.

Although Pălimaru did get a lot of play time, during the 2006–07 season he began to grow in form and was the team's top scorer in the training games during the winter break. He shortly broke the ice in Liga I, contributing with a goal in the 4–0 victory over Jiul Petroşani.

== International career ==
Pălimaru appeared five times for the Romania under-21 football team. In the 2009 European Under-21 Championship qualifiers he scored the only goal of the game against Malta, in the last minute, after coming on as a substitute.
