= Sergei Ratnikov =

Estonian manager and footballer

Personal information
- Full name: Sergei Ratnikov
- Date of birth: 21 November 1959 (age 66)
- Place of birth: Pärnu, then part of Estonian SSR, Soviet Union
- Position: Midfielder

Senior career*
Years	Team	Apps	(Gls)
1983–1984	SVSM Tallinn	?	(?)
1984–1988	SK Sport Tallinn	?	(?)
1988–1990	Pärnu Kalakombinaat/MEK	?	(11)
1990–1991	FF Jaro	?	(?)
1991–1992	Vasa IFK	?	(?)
1992	Pärnu JK Vaprus	?	(?)
1992–1993	FC Nikol Tallinn	?	(?)
1993–1995	FC Flora Tallinn	?	(?)
1998–1999	JK Tallinna Sadam	?	(?)

International career
1992–1994	Estonia	14	(0)

Managerial career
- 1988–1992: Pärnu JK
- 1994–1996: JK Tervis Pärnu
- 1996–1997: Lelle SK
- 1997–1998: Viljandi JK Tulevik
- 1998–1999: JK Tallinna Sadam
- 1999–2000: Maardu FC Levadia
- 2003–2004: Tallinna FC TVMK
- 2006–2007: Tartu JK Tammeka/JK Maag Tammeka
- 2008: Tallinna FC TVMK
- 2009: Narva JK Trans
- 2010–2012: JK Tallinna Kalev
- 2013–2014: JK Sillamäe Kalev
- 2015: Tallinn C.F.
- 2016: FC Levadia Tallinn
- * Club domestic league appearances and goals

Sergei Ratnikov (born 21 November 1959) is an Estonian professional football manager and former player. He last managed Levadia in Estonian Meistriliiga.

== Personal ==
Two of Ratnikov's sons, Eduard Ratnikov and Daniil Ratnikov, are footballers.

== International career ==
Ratnikov played for the Estonia national football team during the 1990s. He earned his first official cap on June 3, 1992, when Estonia met Slovenia in a friendly.

== Club career ==
He has played for clubs like FC Flora Tallinn, FC Nikol Tallinn, and in Finland for VIFK Vaasa and FF Jaro.

== Honours ==
Individual

- Meistriliiga Manager of the Month: July 2013, March 2014
