= Daniil Ratnikov =

Estonian footballer

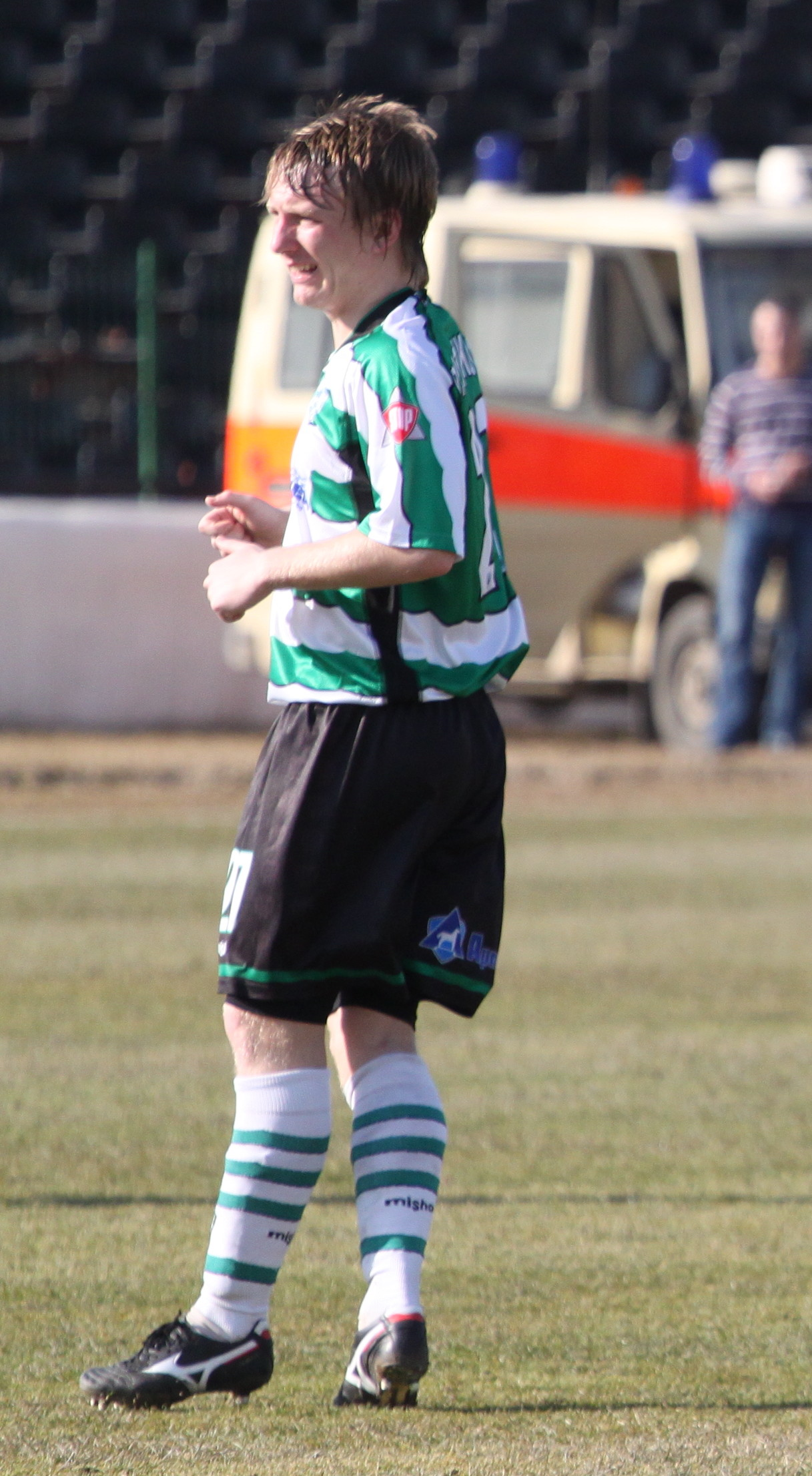
- Ratnikov playing for Cherno More in 2011

Personal information
- Full name: Daniil Ratnikov
- Date of birth: 10 February 1988 (age 38)
- Place of birth: Pärnu, then part of Estonian SSR, Soviet Union
- Height: 1.73 m (5 ft 8 in)
- Position: Attacking midfielder

Youth career
- –2005: TVMK

Senior career*
| Years | Team | Apps | (Gls) |
| 2004–2005 | TVMK | 7 | (1) |
| 2006–2007 | Tartu Tammeka | 58 | (3) |
| 2008 | TVMK | 19 | (1) |
| 2009 | Narva Trans | 29 | (10) |
| 2010–2011 | Cherno More Varna | 26 | (3) |
| 2012 | Tallinna Kalev | 7 | (0) |
| 2013–2015 | Sillamäe Kalev | 84 | (26) |
| 2016 | Levadia | 14 | (0) |
| 2017 | Sillamäe Kalev | 13 | (3) |
- * Club domestic league appearances and goals

Daniil Ratnikov (born 10 February 1988) is a former Estonian professional footballer who played as an attacking midfielder.

== Career ==
Born in Pärnu, Ratnikov came through the youth ranks at TVMK Tallinn, reaching the first team at 16.

== Personal life ==
His father Sergei is a former international player for Estonia and football manager, while his brother Eduard Ratnikov was also a professional footballer.

== Career stats ==
| Season | Club | Country | Level | Apps | Goals |
|---|---|---|---|---|---|
| 2012 | Tallinna Kalev | Estonia | I | 7 | 0 |
| 2011–12 | Cherno More | Bulgaria | I | 3 | 0 |
| 2010–11 | Cherno More | Bulgaria | I | 16 | 2 |
| 2009–10 | Cherno More | Bulgaria | I | 7 | 1 |
| 2009 | Trans Narva | Estonia | I | 29 | 10 |
| 2008 | TVMK Tallinn | Estonia | I | 19 | 1 |
| 2007 | Maag Tammeka Tartu | Estonia | I | 29 | 2 |
| 2006 | Tammeka Tartu | Estonia | I | 29 | 1 |
| 2005 | TVMK Tallinn | Estonia | I | 3 | 0 |
| 2004 | TVMK Tallinn | Estonia | I | 4 | 1 |

== Honours ==
Individual

- Meistriliiga Manager of the Month: May 2014, October 2014
