= Emil Jula =

Romanian footballer (1980–2020)

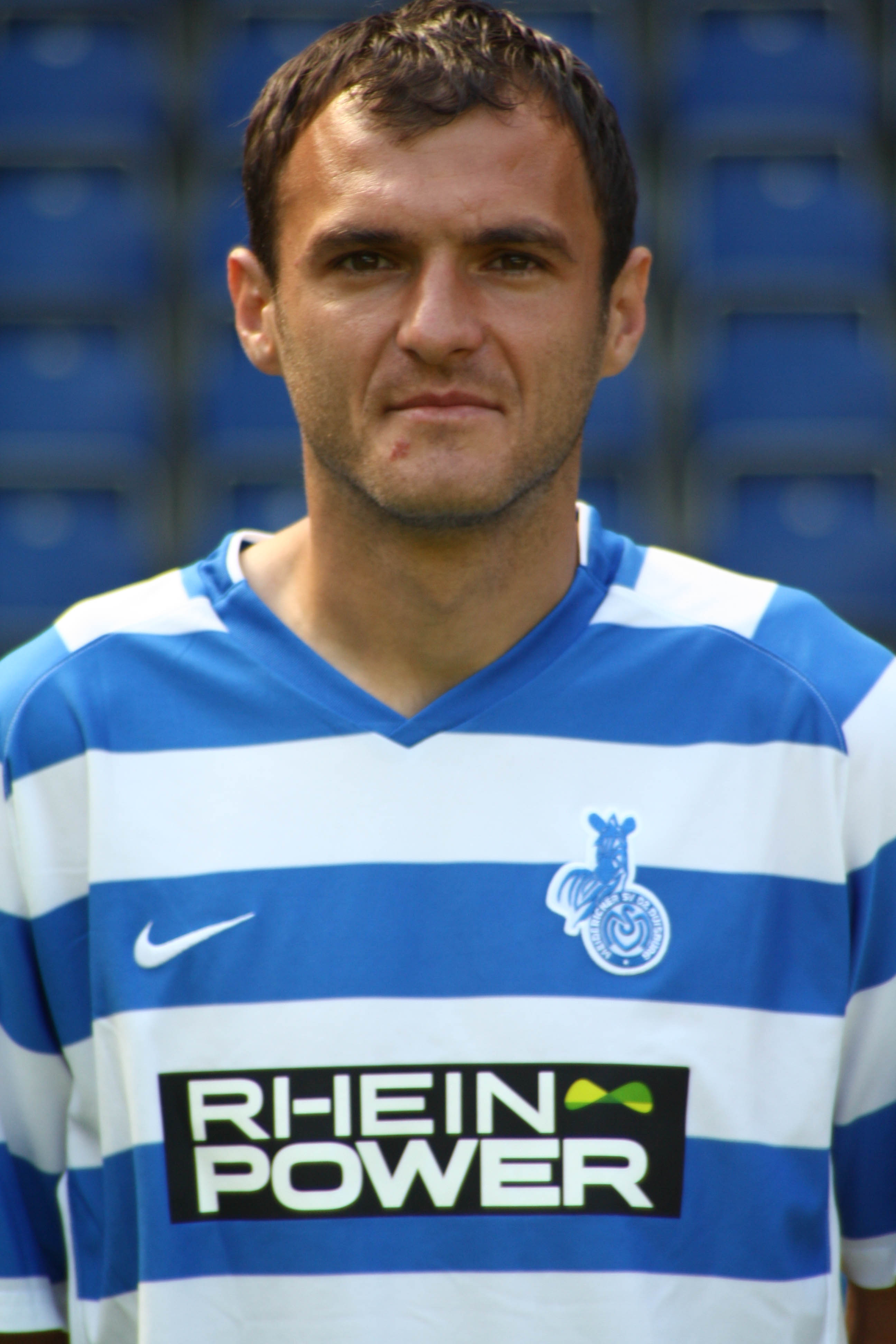
- Jula with MSV Duisburg in June 2011

Personal information
- Full name: Emil Gabriel Jula
- Date of birth: 3 January 1980
- Place of birth: Cluj-Napoca, Romania
- Date of death: 22 August 2020 (aged 40)
- Place of death: Bersenbrück, Germany
- Height: 1.92 m (6 ft 4 in)
- Position: Forward

Youth career
- 1989–1998: Universitatea Cluj

Senior career*
Years	Team	Apps	(Gls)
1998–2000	Universitatea Cluj	2	(0)
1999–2000	→ Unirea Dej (loan)		
2001–2003	Cuprirom Abrud		
2003–2006	Universitatea Cluj	64	(19)
2006–2008	Oțelul Galați	75	(37)
2008–2011	Energie Cottbus	91	(26)
2011–2013	MSV Duisburg	23	(4)
2012–2013	→ Anorthosis Famagusta (loan)	7	(0)
2013	→ VfL Osnabrück (loan)	8	(2)
2013–2014	Ceahlăul Piatra Neamț	23	(3)
2014	Universitatea Cluj	5	(0)
2014–2015	Oțelul Galați	9	(0)
2015–2018	TuS Bersenbrück	69	(30)
Total		366	(115)

Managerial career
- 2014–2015: Oțelul Galați (assistant manager)
- 2018–2020: TuS Bersenbrück (assistant manager)
- * Club domestic league appearances and goals

Emil Gabriel Jula (3 January 1980 – 22 August 2020) was a Romanian professional football player and coach who played as a forward.

== Career ==
=== Early career ===
Jula was born on 3 January 1980 in Cluj-Napoca, Romania and began playing junior-level football at local club Universitatea. He made his Divizia A debut on 17 October 1998, playing for "U" under the guidance of coach Tiberiu Poraczky in a 3–1 away loss to Național București. The team was relegated at the end of the season and he went on loan to Unirea Dej.

In 2000, Jula had to put his career on hold for approximately one year due to military service. During this time he was deployed to maintain order at various events, including at a Cluj derby match between his former side, Universitatea, and CFR Cluj in Divizia B. Following this period, he weighed 120 kilograms and was considering quitting football. However, an offer from Divizia C club, Cuprirom Abrud, changed his mind. After seeing in a newspaper that his former club, "U" Cluj was organizing a trial, Jula chose to participate and coach Ioan Sabău kept him in the squad for the 2003–04 Divizia B season.

=== Oțelul Galați ===
Three years later, Jula went back to first league football, as he left "U" free of contract and signed with Oțelul Galați where he worked with coach Petre Grigoraș. He scored his first goal for Oțelul on 30 September 2006 when he opened the score in a 2–1 home victory against UTA Arad. On 22 October he scored the victory goal in a 2–1 win over Steaua București, netting 14 goals until the end of the season, including a hat-trick in a success over Argeș Pitești and two doubles in a draw against Rapid București and a 2–1 victory against Dinamo București.

He made his debut in European competitions by helping The Steelworkers win the 2007 Intertoto Cup, a campaign where the club eliminated Slavija Istočno Sarajevo and Trabzonspor, with Jula netting a brace against the former and a goal against the latter. Subsequently, Oțelul qualified to the UEFA Cup second round where they were defeated 3–1 on aggregate by Lokomotiv Sofia.

In the 2007–08 season, Jula was the league's second top scorer with 17 goals, having four less than Dinamo's Ionel Dănciulescu, most notably managing a hat-trick in a victory against Gloria Buzău. He also netted a brace in the loss to Buzău from the first half of the season, and scored three more doubles in victories against Dacia Mioveni, Pandurii Târgu Jiu and Ceahlăul Piatra Neamț.

=== Energie Cottbus ===
His performances earned him a move to German club Energie Cottbus which paid Oțelul €700,000 for his transfer, giving Jula a €300,000 yearly salary, and there he was a colleague of compatriots Sergiu Radu and Ovidiu Burcă. He made his Bundesliga debut on 30 August 2008 when coach Bojan Prašnikar sent him in the 78th minute to replace Ervin Skela in a 1–0 loss to Borussia Dortmund. He scored his first goal on 29 November in a 3–1 victory against Borussia Mönchengladbach. Jula netted a total of four goals in his first season, including a brace in a 3–0 win over Bayer Leverkusen in the last round which helped his side reach the relegation play-off where they were defeated by Nürnberg. In the following season he managed 12 goals and 12 assists, being alongside two other players the top assist provider of the 2. Bundesliga. In his last season he scored 10 goals and provided nine assists.

Jula has a total of 100 matches, 29 goals and 24 assists for Energie Cottbus in all competitions.

=== MSV Duisburg and loans ===
In the summer of 2011, Jula signed with MSV Duisburg where he scored four goals in the 2011–12 2. Bundesliga season.

In 2012, Duisburg loaned him to Cypriot side, Anorthosis Famagusta where he was teammates with fellow Romanian Dan Alexa. In January 2013, he joined VfL Osnabrück where the highlight was a double netted during a match against Hansa Rostock, which ended with a 3–2 victory after a comeback from 0–2.

=== Return to Romania ===
In 2013, Jula returned to Romania, being convinced to sign with Ceahlăul Piatra Neamț by coach Vasile Miriuță, managing to score on his first game since his return, a 2–1 loss to Steaua București. In June 2014 he made a comeback to "U" Cluj but left the team in September after only five games to sign with Oțelul Galați. During his second spell with Oțelul, on 7 December 2014, Jula made his last appearance in the Romanian first league, playing in a 2–0 home loss to ASA Târgu Mureș, totaling 89 matches with 34 goals in the competition.

=== TuS Bersenbrück ===
In 2015 he went to play for TuS Bersenbrück in the German lower leagues where three years later, he ended his career. After he retired, Jula worked as Bersenbrück's assistant coach.

== Death ==
He died of a heart attack on 22 August 2020, aged 40.

== Honours ==
Oțelul Galați

- Intertoto Cup: 2007
