= Eduard Ratnikov =

Estonian footballer

Personal information
- Date of birth: 13 September 1983 (age 43)
- Place of birth: Pärnu, then part of Estonian SSR, Soviet Union
- Height: 1.83 m (6 ft 0 in)
- Position: Midfielder

Youth career
- 1999: FC Puuma Tallinn

Senior career*
Years	Team	Apps	(Gls)
2000–2005	FC Levadia	68	(8)
2002	→ Pärnu Levadia (loan)	?	(?)
2005–2007	Beroe Stara Zagora	19	(0)
2007	JK Maag Tammeka	15	(3)
2007	Oțelul Galați	3	(0)
2008	FC Irtysh Pavlodar	1	(0)
2008	FC TVMK Tallinn	15	(6)
2009	Narva Trans	31	(5)
2010	Levadia Tallinn	11	(0)
2011	Tallinna FC Akhtamar	9	(5)
2011–2012	SK Kiviõli Tamme Auto	23	(3)
2012	JK Tallinna Kalev	9	(4)
- * Club domestic league appearances and goals as of 1 December 2012

Eduard Ratnikov (born 13 September 1983 in Pärnu) is a retired Estonian football player. He has played in Romanian Liga I club Oţelul Galaţi where his contract with the Romanian Liga I club Oțelul Galați was terminated after just a few appearances for the club.

He then had a brief spell in Kazakhstan, before returning to his former club FC Levadia Tallinn. After leaving Levadia Tallinn, Ratnikov played for Esiliiga club SK Kiviõli Tamme Auto, before returning to the Meistriliiga halfway through the 2012 Season after signing with his father's side JK Tallinna Kalev.

Prior to his move to Romania, Ratnikov had spells at Estonian Meistriliiga clubs Maag Tammeka Tartu, Levadia Tallinn and Bulgarian team Beroe Stara Zagora.

== Personal life ==
His father Sergei is a former international player for Estonia, while his brother Daniil also plays as a professional footballer.
