= Kim Gil-sik =

South Korean footballer (born 1978)

Kim Gil-Sik 김길식
Personal information
- Date of birth: 24 August 1978 (age 48)
- Place of birth: South Korea
- Height: 1.78 m (5 ft 10 in)
- Position: Midfielder

Team information
- Current team: Chungbuk Cheongju (manager)

Youth career
- 1997–2000: Dankook University

Senior career*
Years	Team	Apps	(Gls)
2001–2003	Jeonnam Dragons	8	(1)
2004–2006	Bucheon SK / Jeju United	57	(6)
2007	Oțelul Galați	19	(2)
2008	Daejeon Citizen	9	(0)
Total		93	(9)

International career
2000	South Korea U23	1	(0)

Managerial career
- 2012: Jeonnam Dragons (scout and coach)
- 2013: Gwangju FC (coach)
- 2014–2017: South Korea U16 (assistant coach)
- 2018: South Korea U15
- 2020–2021: Ansan Greeners
- 2025–: Chungbuk Cheongju
- * Club domestic league appearances and goals

- Kim Gil-sik
- Hangul: 김길식
- Hanja: 金吉植
- RR: Gim Gilsik
- MR: Kim Kilsik

Kim Gil-Sik (Korean: 김길식; born 24 August 1978) is a South Korean football coach and former player. He is currently the manager of Chungbuk Cheongju.

== Club career ==
Kim played for Chunnam Dragons, Bucheon SK / Jeju United, Daejeon Citizen, and Oțelul Galați in the Romanian Liga I in his professional career.

He was released from Daejeon Citizen on 6 March 2009.

At the end of the 2008 season, Kim retired from professional football.

== International career ==
Kim was part of the South Korea squad at the 2000 Summer Olympic as a reserve player.

== Managerial career ==
In 2012, Kim joined Jeonnam Dragons as a scout and coach. He moved to Gwangju FC the following year as a coach. Afterwards, he joined the Korean National Team as chief assistant coach of the U-17 and U-16 squad. In 2018, he was appointed manager of the Under-15 squad of the Korea national team.

On 31 December 2019, Kim was appointed as the manager of Ansan Greeners FC

== Career statistics ==
Appearances and goals by club, season and competition
Club	Season	League			National cup (Note: Includes KFA Cup, Cupa României)		League cup (Note: Includes Korean League Cup, Cupa Ligii)		Continental		Total	
Club	Season	Division	Apps	Goals	Apps	Goals	Apps	Goals	Apps	Goals	Apps	Goals
Jeonnam Dragons	2001	K-League	2	0			4	1	–			
Jeonnam Dragons	2002	K-League	0	0			0	0	–			
Jeonnam Dragons	2003	K-League	6	1	1	0	–		–		7	0
Jeonnam Dragons	Total		8	1	!0	4	1	–				
Bucheon SK	2004	K-League	14	0	0	0	10	1	–		24	1
Bucheon SK	2005	K-League	21	3	0	0	10	2	–		31	5
Bucheon SK	Total		35	3	0	0	20	3	–		55	6
Jeju United	2006	K-League	22	3	0	0	9	0	–		31	3
Oțelul Galați	2006–07	Liga I	13	2	1	1	–		–		14	3
Oțelul Galați	2007–08	Liga I	6	0	0	0	–		6	0	12	0
Oțelul Galați	Total		19	2	1	1	–		6	0	26	3
Daejeon Citizen	2008	K-League	9	0	0	0	1	0	–		10	0
Career total			93	9	2	1	34	4	6	0	135	14

Sporting positions
Preceded by Ko Jong-Soo	Daejeon Citizen captain 2009	Succeeded by Choi Eun-Sung
