= Ramses Gado =

Romanian footballer

Personal information
- Date of birth: 9 May 1982 (age 44)
- Place of birth: Oradea, Romania
- Height: 1.80 m (5 ft 11 in)
- Position: Winger

Senior career*
Years	Team	Apps	(Gls)
1998−2006	FC Oradea	94	(19)
2006−2009	Oțelul Galați	70	(5)
2009−2010	Internaţional	3	(1)
2010−2013	Politehnica Iași	30	(8)
2013−2014	Universitatea Craiova	2	(0)
2014	Șoimii Pâncota	0	(0)
2014	FC Hidișelu de Sus	6	(12)
2015−2017	Diosig Bihardiószeg		
2017	Dinamo Oradea		
2018−2021	Foresta Tileagd	40	(47)
2021	Vulturii Săcueni	4	(4)
Total		249+	(96+)
- * Club domestic league appearances and goals as of 11:21, 14 July 2023 (UTC)

Ramses Gado (born 9 May 1982), also known as The Pharaoh, is a Romanian former footballer who played as a winger. In his career Gado played for teams such as FC Bihor, Oțelul Galați and Politehnica Iași, among others.

== Personal life ==
Gado is of gipsy origin. He is named Ramses because his grandfather was impressed by Egypt's history and insisted for him to be named after the pharaoh Ramesses.

== Legal trouble ==
In April 2010 Gado was arrested for organizing illegal dog fights in Hungary, having spent three months in prison. In April 2018 he was arrested again for illegal dog fights, this time organized on his property from Oradea.

== Honours ==
Bihor Oradea

- Norcia Winter Cup: 2004, Runner-up 2005

Politehnica Iași

- Liga II: 2011–12

Universitatea Craiova

- Liga II: 2013–14

Diosig

- Liga IV – Bihor County: 2016–17
- Cupa României – Bihor County: 2016–17

Foresta Tileagd

- Liga V – Bihor County: 2018–19
