= Flavius Băd =

Romanian footballer

Personal information
- Full name: Flavius Lucian Băd
- Date of birth: 24 May 1983 (age 43)
- Place of birth: Arad, Romania
- Height: 1.82 m (6 ft 0 in)
- Position: Striker

Team information
- Current team: Victoria Zăbrani
- Number: 9

Youth career
- CSȘ Arad
- Gloria Arad

Senior career*
| Years | Team | Apps | (Gls) |
| 2003–2004 | Frontiera Curtici | | |
| 2004–2005 | Poli AEK Timișoara | 27 | (4) |
| 2005–2006 | Național București | 9 | (0) |
| 2006 | UTA Arad | 13 | (1) |
| 2006–2008 | Gloria Bistrița | 30 | (4) |
| 2008–2012 | Universitatea Cluj | 0 | (0) |
| 2011–2012 | Național Sebiș | | |
| 2014–2015 | Șoimii Pâncota | 4 | (0) |
| 2016–2017 | Victoria Felnac | | |
| 2017– | Victoria Zăbrani | | |
- * Club domestic league appearances and goals as of 26 September 2018

Flavius Lucian Băd (born 24 May 1983) is a Romanian football player who plays for Liga IV side Victoria Zăbrani.
