= UEFA Euro 2000 qualifying =

Tournament details
- Dates: 4 June 1998 – 17 November 1999
- Teams: 49

Tournament statistics
- Matches played: 228
- Goals scored: 652 (2.86 per match)
- Top scorer: (Spain) Raúl (11 goals)

Qualifying for the UEFA Euro 2000 final tournament, took place throughout 1998 and 1999. Forty-nine teams were divided into nine groups. All teams played against each other, within their groups, on a home-and-away basis. The winner of each group and the best runner-up qualified automatically for the final tournament. The rest of the runners-up played an additional set of playoff matches amongst each other.

Both Belgium and the Netherlands qualified automatically as co-hosts of the event.

== Qualified teams ==
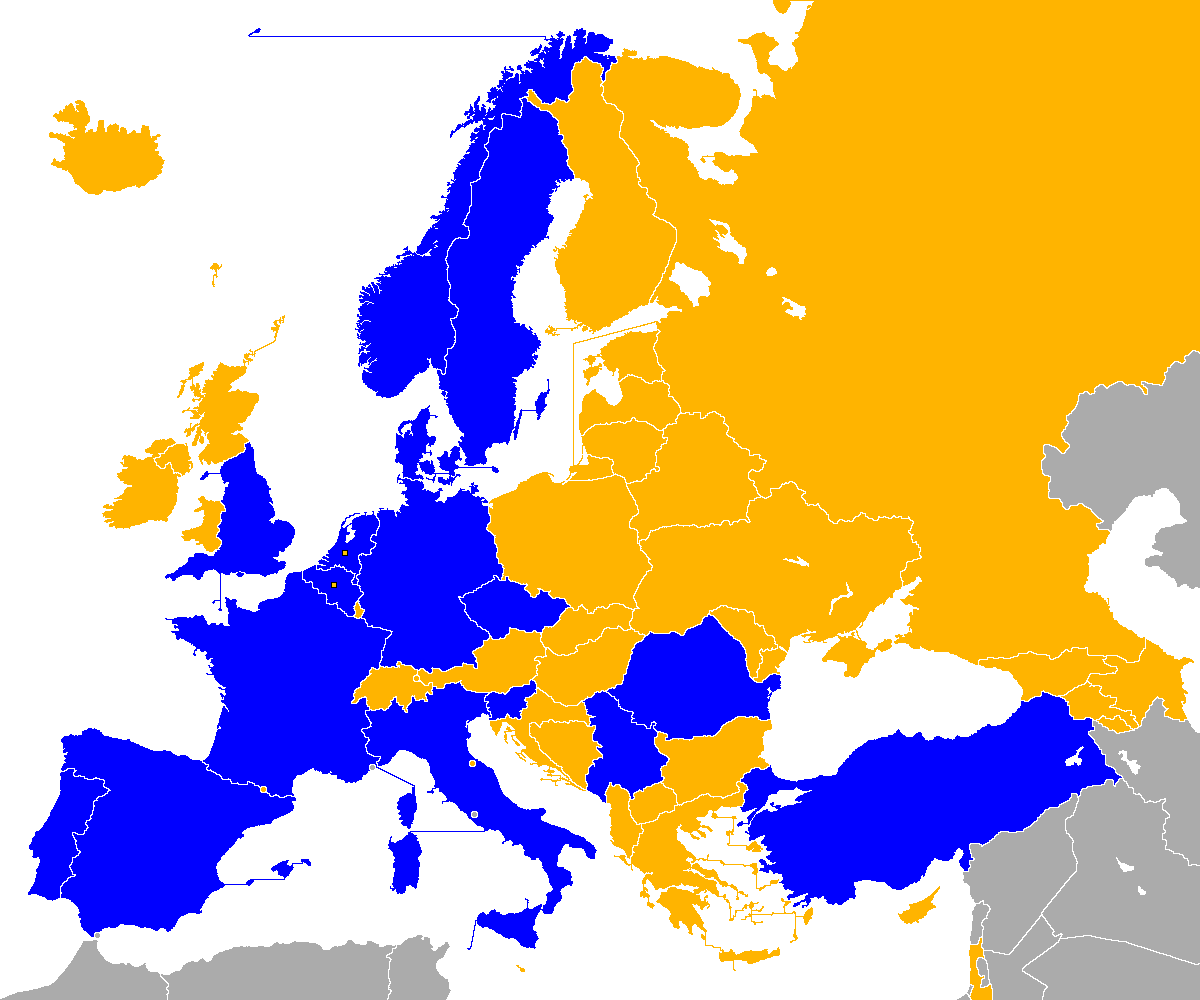
Qualified Did not qualify Did not enter Not a UEFA member

Team	Qualified as	Qualified on	Previous appearances in tournament (Note: Bold indicates champion for that year. Italic indicates host for that year.)
Belgium	Co-host	14 July 1995	3 (1972, 1980, 1984)
Netherlands	Co-host	14 July 1995	5 (1976, 1980, **1988**, 1992, 1996)
Czech Republic (Note: From 1960 to 1980, the Czech Republic competed as Czechoslovakia.)	Group 9 winner	9 June 1999	4 (1960, **1976**, 1980, 1996)
Norway	Group 2 winner	8 September 1999	0 (debut)
Sweden	Group 5 winner	8 September 1999	1 (1992)
Spain	Group 6 winner	8 September 1999	5 (**1964**, 1980, 1984, 1988, 1996)
Italy	Group 1 winner	9 October 1999	4 (**1968**, 1980, 1988, 1996)
Germany (Note: From 1972 to 1988, Germany competed as West Germany.)	Group 3 winner	9 October 1999	7 (**1972**, 1976, **1980**, 1984, 1988, 1992, **1996**)
France	Group 4 winner	9 October 1999	4 (1960, **1984**, 1992, 1996)
Romania	Group 7 winner	9 October 1999	2 (1984, 1996)
FR Yugoslavia (Note: From 1960 to 1984, FR Yugoslavia competed as Yugoslavia.)	Group 8 winner	9 October 1999	4 (1960, 1968, 1976, 1984)
Portugal	Best runner-up	9 October 1999	2 (1984, 1996)
Denmark	Play-off winner	17 November 1999	5 (1964, 1984, 1988, **1992**, 1996)
England	Play-off winner	17 November 1999	5 (1968, 1980, 1988, 1992, 1996)
Slovenia	Play-off winner	17 November 1999	0 (debut)
Turkey	Play-off winner	17 November 1999	1 (1996)

== Qualification seeding ==
The draw occurred on 18 January 1998, in Ghent, Belgium. The 49 participating teams were divided into five drawing pots based on the newly introduced 1997-edition of the UEFA national team coefficient ranking, which calculated an average of the team's points per game achieved combined in the Euro 1996 and 1998 World Cup qualifiers. The seeding list was however subject to some few minor modifications:

- Germany were seeded first and not fifth as the defending champions (title holders).
- Netherlands (ranked 11th) and Belgium (ranked 18th) were not seeded, as they did not participate in the qualifying tournament due to already having qualified automatically for the final tournament as hosts. Consequently, all teams ranked below them moved up one or two seeding places higher than their rankings.

Nine groups were formed by drawing one team from each of the five pots. The remaining four teams from pot five, were subsequently drawn into four of the groups (randomly selected); meaning that the four groups with six teams featured two teams from pot five.

Pot 1
Team	Coeff	Seed
Germany (title holders)	2.35	1
Spain	2.60	2
Romania	2.45	3
Russia	2.39	4
England	2.37	5
Scotland	2.30	6
FR Yugoslavia	2.30	7
Italy	2.28	8
Norway	2.22	9

Pot 2
Team	Coeff	Seed
Bulgaria	2.22	10
Croatia	2.11	11
Denmark	2.11	12
Portugal	2.10	13
Austria	2.05	14
France	2.00	15
Czech Republic	1.85	16
Turkey	1.81	17
Greece	1.78	18

Pot 3
Team	Coeff	Seed
Republic of Ireland	1.75	19
Switzerland	1.69	20
Sweden	1.67	21
Lithuania	1.65	22
Ukraine	1.65	23
Slovakia	1.50	24
Finland	1.44	25
Israel	1.38	26
Georgia	1.38	27

Pot 4
Team	Coeff	Seed
Poland	1.28	28
Hungary	1.25	29
Northern Ireland	1.20	30
Bosnia and Herzegovina	1.12	31
Latvia	1.10	32
Macedonia	1.00	33
Cyprus	0.94	34
Wales	0.38	35
Iceland	0.78	36

Pot 5
Team	Coeff	Seed
Belarus	0.75	37
Slovenia	0.67	38
Armenia	0.65	39
Albania	0.60	40
Faroe Islands	0.60	41
Luxembourg	0.55	42
Moldova	0.50	43
Azerbaijan	0.22	44
Estonia	0.20	45
Malta	0.20	46
Liechtenstein	0.05	47
San Marino	0.00	48
Andorra	NR	49

Note: The UEFA national team coefficient ranking automatically had taken into account in its ranking calculation, that France automatically qualified as hosts for the 1998 FIFA World Cup, meaning that the coefficient for France only factored their UEFA Euro 1996 qualifying record. Similarly, the coefficient considered only the 1998 FIFA World Cup qualification record for England, FR Yugoslavia, and Bosnia and Herzegovina. England automatically qualified as hosts of UEFA Euro 1996 while FR Yugoslavia were suspended due to UN sanctions. Bosnia and Herzegovina made their European qualification debut. Andorra made their qualification debut after being admitted to UEFA in November 1996.

== Summary ==
Group winners and the best ranked runner-up qualified directly for UEFA Euro 2000
The remaining runners-up advanced to the play-offs
Other teams were eliminated after the qualifying group stage

Group 1	Group 2	Group 3	Group 4	Group 5	Group 6	Group 7	Group 8	Group 9
Italy	Norway	Germany	France	Sweden	Spain	Romania	FR Yugoslavia	Czech Republic
Denmark	Slovenia	Turkey	Ukraine	England	Israel	Portugal	Republic of Ireland	Scotland
Switzerland Wales Belarus	Greece Latvia Albania Georgia	Finland Northern Ireland Moldova	Russia Iceland Armenia Andorra	Poland Bulgaria Luxembourg	Austria Cyprus San Marino	Slovakia Hungary Azerbaijan Liechtenstein	Croatia Macedonia Malta	Bosnia and Herzegovina Lithuania Estonia Faroe Islands

== Tiebreakers ==
If two or more teams finished level on points after completion of the group matches, the following tie-breakers were used to determine the final ranking:

1. Higher number of points obtained in the matches played among the teams in question;
2. Superior goal difference in matches played among the teams in question;
3. Higher number of goals scored away from home in the matches played among the teams in question;
4. Superior goal difference in all group matches;
5. Higher number of goals scored in all group matches;
6. Higher number of away goals scored in all group matches;
7. Fair play conduct in all group matches (1 point for a single yellow card, 3 points for a red card as a consequence of two yellow cards, 3 points for a direct red card, 4 points for a yellow card followed by a direct red card).

== Groups ==
=== Group 1 ===
Pos	Team	Pld	W	D	L	GF	GA	GD	Pts	Qualification	(Italy)	(Denmark)	(Switzerland)	(Wales)	(Belarus)
1	Italy	8	4	3	1	13	5	+8	15	Qualify for final tournament	—	2–3	2–0	4–0	1–1
2	Denmark	8	4	2	2	11	8	+3	14 (Note: Head-to-head points: Denmark 4, Switzerland 1.)	Advance to play-offs	1–2	—	2–1	1–2	1–0
3	Switzerland	8	4	2	2	9	5	+4	14		0–0	1–1	—	2–0	2–0
4	Wales	8	3	0	5	7	16	−9	9		0–2	0–2	0–2	—	3–2
5	Belarus	8	0	3	5	4	10	−6	3		0–0	0–0	0–1	1–2	—

Source: UEFA

=== Group 2 ===
Pos	Team	Pld	W	D	L	GF	GA	GD	Pts	Qualification	(Norway)	(Slovenia)	(Greece)	(Latvia)	(Albania)	(Georgia (country))
1	Norway	10	8	1	1	21	9	+12	25	Qualify for final tournament	—	4–0	1–0	1–3	2–2	1–0
2	Slovenia	10	5	2	3	12	14	−2	17	Advance to play-offs	1–2	—	0–3	1–0	2–0	2–1
3	Greece	10	4	3	3	13	8	+5	15		0–2	2–2	—	1–2	2–0	3–0
4	Latvia	10	3	4	3	13	12	+1	13		1–2	1–2	0–0	—	0–0	1–0
5	Albania	10	1	4	5	8	14	−6	7		1–2	0–1	0–0	3–3	—	2–1
6	Georgia	10	1	2	7	8	18	−10	5		1–4	1–1	1–2	2–2	1–0	—

Source: UEFA

=== Group 3 ===
Pos	Team	Pld	W	D	L	GF	GA	GD	Pts	Qualification	(Germany)	(Turkey)	(Finland)	(Northern Ireland)	(Moldova)
1	Germany	8	6	1	1	20	4	+16	19	Qualify for final tournament	—	0–0	2–0	4–0	6–1
2	Turkey	8	5	2	1	15	6	+9	17	Advance to play-offs	1–0	—	1–3	3–0	2–0
3	Finland	8	3	1	4	13	13	0	10		1–2	2–4	—	4–1	3–2
4	Northern Ireland	8	1	2	5	4	19	−15	5		0–3	0–3	1–0	—	2–2
5	Moldova	8	0	4	4	7	17	−10	4		1–3	1–1	0–0	0–0	—

Source: UEFA

=== Group 4 ===
Pos	Team	Pld	W	D	L	GF	GA	GD	Pts	Qualification	(France)	(Ukraine)	(Russia)	(Iceland)	(Armenia)	(Andorra)
1	France	10	6	3	1	17	10	+7	21	Qualify for final tournament	—	0–0	2–3	3–2	2–0	2–0
2	Ukraine	10	5	5	0	14	4	+10	20	Advance to play-offs	0–0	—	3–2	1–1	2–0	4–0
3	Russia	10	6	1	3	22	12	+10	19		2–3	1–1	—	1–0	2–0	6–1
4	Iceland	10	4	3	3	12	7	+5	15		1–1	0–1	1–0	—	2–0	3–0
5	Armenia	10	2	2	6	8	15	−7	8		2–3	0–0	0–3	0–0	—	3–1
6	Andorra	10	0	0	10	3	28	−25	0		0–1	0–2	1–2	0–2	0–3	—

Source: UEFA

=== Group 5 ===
Pos	Team	Pld	W	D	L	GF	GA	GD	Pts	Qualification	(Sweden)	(England)	(Poland)	(Bulgaria)	(Luxembourg)
1	Sweden	8	7	1	0	10	1	+9	22	Qualify for final tournament	—	2–1	2–0	1–0	2–0
2	England	8	3	4	1	14	4	+10	13 (Note: Head-to-head points: England 4, Poland 1.)	Advance to play-offs	0–0	—	3–1	0–0	6–0
3	Poland	8	4	1	3	12	8	+4	13		0–1	0–0	—	2–0	3–0
4	Bulgaria	8	2	2	4	6	8	−2	8		0–1	1–1	0–3	—	3–0
5	Luxembourg	8	0	0	8	2	23	−21	0		0–1	0–3	2–3	0–2	—

Source: UEFA

=== Group 6 ===
Pos	Team	Pld	W	D	L	GF	GA	GD	Pts	Qualification	(Spain)	(Israel)	(Austria)	(Cyprus)	(San Marino)
1	Spain	8	7	0	1	42	5	+37	21	Qualify for final tournament	—	3–0	9–0	8–0	9–0
2	Israel	8	4	1	3	25	9	+16	13 (Note: Head-to-head points: Israel 4, Austria 1.)	Advance to play-offs	1–2	—	5–0	3–0	8–0
3	Austria	8	4	1	3	19	20	−1	13		1–3	1–1	—	3–1	7–0
4	Cyprus	8	4	0	4	12	21	−9	12		3–2	3–2	0–3	—	4–0
5	San Marino	8	0	0	8	1	44	−43	0		0–6	0–5	1–4	0–1	—

Source: UEFA

=== Group 7 ===
Pos	Team	Pld	W	D	L	GF	GA	GD	Pts	Qualification	(Romania)	(Portugal)	(Slovakia)	(Hungary)	(Azerbaijan)	(Liechtenstein)
1	Romania	10	7	3	0	25	3	+22	24	Qualify for final tournament	—	1–1	0–0	2–0	4–0	7–0
2	Portugal	10	7	2	1	32	4	+28	23	Qualify for final tournament	0–1	—	1–0	3–0	7–0	8–0
3	Slovakia	10	5	2	3	12	9	+3	17		1–5	0–3	—	0–0	3–0	2–0
4	Hungary	10	3	3	4	14	10	+4	12		1–1	1–3	0–1	—	3–0	5–0
5	Azerbaijan	10	1	1	8	6	26	−20	4 (Note: Tied on head-to-head points (3). Head-to-head goal difference: Azerbaijan +3, Liechtenstein −3.)		0–1	1–1	0–1	0–4	—	4–0
6	Liechtenstein	10	1	1	8	2	39	−37	4		0–3	0–5	0–4	0–0	2–1	—

Source: UEFA

=== Group 8 ===
Pos	Team	Pld	W	D	L	GF	GA	GD	Pts	Qualification	(Federal Republic of Yugoslavia)	(Republic of Ireland)	(Croatia)	(North Macedonia)	(Malta)
1	FR Yugoslavia	8	5	2	1	18	8	+10	17	Qualify for final tournament	—	1–0	0–0	3–1	4–1
2	Republic of Ireland	8	5	1	2	14	6	+8	16	Advance to play-offs	2–1	—	2–0	1–0	5–0
3	Croatia	8	4	3	1	13	9	+4	15		2–2	1–0	—	3–2	2–1
4	Macedonia	8	2	2	4	13	14	−1	8		2–4	1–1	1–1	—	4–0
5	Malta	8	0	0	8	6	27	−21	0		0–3	2–3	1–4	1–2	—

Source: UEFA

=== Group 9 ===
Pos	Team	Pld	W	D	L	GF	GA	GD	Pts	Qualification	(Czech Republic)	(Scotland)	(Bosnia and Herzegovina)	(Lithuania)	(Estonia)	(Faroe Islands)
1	Czech Republic	10	10	0	0	26	5	+21	30	Qualify for final tournament	—	3–2	3–0	2–0	4–1	2–0
2	Scotland	10	5	3	2	15	10	+5	18	Advance to play-offs	1–2	—	1–0	3–0	3–2	2–1
3	Bosnia and Herzegovina	10	3	2	5	14	17	−3	11 (Note: Head-to-head points: Bosnia and Herzegovina 7, Lithuania 6, Estonia 4.)		1–3	1–2	—	2–0	1–1	1–0
4	Lithuania	10	3	2	5	8	16	−8	11		0–4	0–0	4–2	—	1–2	0–0
5	Estonia	10	3	2	5	15	17	−2	11		0–2	0–0	1–4	1–2	—	5–0
6	Faroe Islands	10	0	3	7	4	17	−13	3		0–1	1–1	2–2	0–1	0–2	—

Source: UEFA

=== Ranking of second-placed teams ===
The best runner-up of the entire group phase qualified automatically for the final tournament. To determine the best runner-up, a comparison was made between all of them. As some groups had five teams and others had six, matches played against fifth and sixth placed teams were discarded, despite the fact that only discarding matches against sixth-place teams would have been sufficient. After the best runner-up was found, all the others entered a random playoff to determine the last four qualifiers.

Portugal qualified automatically as best runner-up, beating Turkey on goal difference.

Pos	Grp	Team	Pld	W	D	L	GF	GA	GD	Pts	Qualification
1	7	Portugal	6	4	1	1	11	3	+8	13	Qualify for final tournament
2	3	Turkey	6	4	1	1	12	5	+7	13	Advance to play-offs
3	9	Scotland	6	3	1	2	9	6	+3	10	Advance to play-offs
4	1	Denmark	6	3	1	2	10	8	+2	10	Advance to play-offs
5	4	Ukraine	6	2	4	0	6	4	+2	10	Advance to play-offs
6	8	Republic of Ireland	6	3	1	2	6	4	+2	10	Advance to play-offs
7	6	Israel	6	2	1	3	12	9	+3	7	Advance to play-offs
8	5	England	6	1	4	1	5	4	+1	7	Advance to play-offs
9	2	Slovenia	6	2	1	3	6	12	−6	7	Advance to play-offs

Source: RSSSF
Rules for classification: Counting only matches against teams ranked first to fourth in the group, 1) Points; 2) Goal difference; 3) Goals scored; 4) Away goals scored; 5) Drawing of lots.

== Play-offs ==
The remaining eight runners-up entered a random playoff, disputed in two legs, home and away.

Team 1	Agg.	Team 2	1st leg	2nd leg
Scotland	1–2	England	0–2	1–0
Israel	0–8	Denmark	0–5	0–3
Slovenia	3–2	Ukraine	2–1	1–1
Republic of Ireland	1–1 (a)	Turkey	1–1	0–0

== Goalscorers ==
There were 652 goals scored in 228 matches, for an average of 2.86 goals per match.

11 goals

- (Spain national football team) Raúl

9 goals

- (Slovenia national football team) Zlatko Zahovič

8 goals

- (Portugal national football team) João Vieira Pinto

7 goals

- (Germany national football team) Oliver Bierhoff

6 goals

- (Bosnia and Herzegovina national football team) Elvir Baljić
- (Czech Republic national football team) Jan Koller
- (Denmark national football team) Jon Dahl Tomasson
- (England national football team) Alan Shearer
- (Portugal national football team) Rui Costa
- (Portugal national football team) Ricardo Sá Pinto
- (Russia national football team) Valeri Karpin
- (Spain national football team) Ismael Urzaiz

5 goals

- (Austria national football team) Ivica Vastić
- (Czech Republic national football team) Patrik Berger
- (England national football team) Paul Scholes
- (Israel national football team) Alon Mizrahi
- (Norway national football team) Tore André Flo
- (Norway national football team) Ole Gunnar Solskjær
- (Republic of Ireland national football team) Robbie Keane
- (Romania national football team) Adrian Ilie
- (Spain national football team) Fernando Hierro
- (Turkey national football team) Tayfur Havutçu
- (Ukraine national football team) Serhiy Rebrov

4 goals

- (Bosnia and Herzegovina national football team) Elvir Bolić
- (Croatia national football team) Davor Šuker
- (Cyprus national football team) Milenko Špoljarić
- (Serbia and Montenegro national football team) Savo Milošević
- (Hungary national football team) Vilmos Sebők
- (Israel national football team) Yossi Benayoun
- (Israel national football team) Haim Revivo
- (Norway national football team) Steffen Iversen
- (Romania national football team) Viorel Moldovan
- (Russia national football team) Vladimir Beschastnykh
- (Russia national football team) Viktor Onopko
- (Scotland national football team) Billy Dodds
- (Spain national football team) Joseba Etxeberria
- (Spain national football team) Luis Enrique
- (Turkey national football team) Hakan Şükür

3 goals

- (Albania national football team) Alban Bushi
- (Armenia national football team) Tigran Yesayan
- (Austria national football team) Christian Mayrleb
- (Czech Republic national football team) Pavel Nedvěd
- (Czech Republic national football team) Vladimír Šmicer
- (Estonia national football team) Andres Oper
- (Estonia national football team) Sergei Terehhov
- (Finland national football team) Jonatan Johansson
- (Finland national football team) Joonas Kolkka
- (Finland national football team) Mixu Paatelainen
- (Serbia and Montenegro national football team) Predrag Mijatović
- (Serbia and Montenegro national football team) Dejan Stanković
- (France national football team) Youri Djorkaeff
- (Georgia national football team) Shota Arveladze
- (Germany national football team) Marco Bode
- (Germany national football team) Ulf Kirsten
- (Germany national football team) Christian Ziege
- (Greece national football team) Nikos Machlas
- (Italy national football team) Filippo Inzaghi
- (Italy national football team) Christian Vieri
- (Latvia national football team) Marians Pahars
- (Latvia national football team) Andrejs Štolcers
- (Lithuania national football team) Valdas Ivanauskas
- (North Macedonia national football team) Saša Ćirić
- (North Macedonia national football team) Artim Šakiri
- (Poland national football team) Tomasz Iwan
- (Portugal national football team) Luís Figo
- (Portugal national football team) Paulo Madeira
- (Republic of Ireland national football team) Niall Quinn
- (Romania national football team) Ionel Ganea
- (Romania national football team) Dorinel Munteanu
- (Scotland national football team) Don Hutchison
- (Spain national football team) Julen Guerrero
- (Sweden men's national football team) Henrik Larsson
- (Switzerland national football team) Stéphane Chapuisat
- (Switzerland national football team) Kubilay Türkyilmaz
- (Turkey national football team) Arif Erdem

2 goals

- (Albania national football team) Igli Tare
- (Armenia national football team) Armen Shahgeldyan
- (Austria national football team) Harald Cerny
- (Austria national football team) Eduard Glieder
- (Austria national football team) Andi Herzog
- (Austria national football team) Hannes Reinmayr
- (Azerbaijan national football team) Gurban Gurbanov
- (Azerbaijan national football team) Zaur Tagizade
- (Belarus national football team) Valyantsin Byalkevich
- (Croatia national football team) Zvonimir Boban
- (Croatia national football team) Mario Stanić
- (Croatia national football team) Davor Vugrinec
- (Cyprus national football team) Panayiotis Engomitis
- (Cyprus national football team) Michalis Konstantinou
- (Czech Republic national football team) Pavel Kuka
- (Denmark national football team) Martin Jørgensen
- (Denmark national football team) Brian Steen Nielsen
- (Denmark national football team) Ebbe Sand
- (Denmark national football team) Stig Tøfting
- (England national football team) Steve McManaman
- (England national football team) Michael Owen
- (Estonia national football team) Martin Reim
- (Faroe Islands national football team) Uni Arge
- (Serbia and Montenegro national football team) Albert Nađ
- (Serbia and Montenegro national football team) Dragan Stojković
- (France national football team) Christophe Dugarry
- (France national football team) Sylvain Wiltord
- (Georgia national football team) Zaza Janashia
- (Greece national football team) Georgios Georgiadis
- (Greece national football team) Vasilios Tsiartas
- (Hungary national football team) Béla Illés
- (Iceland national football team) Ríkharður Daðason
- (Iceland national football team) Eyjólfur Sverrisson
- (Israel national football team) Eyal Berkovic
- (Israel national football team) Najwan Ghrayib
- (Israel national football team) Avi Nimni
- (Italy national football team) Alessandro Del Piero
- (Italy national football team) Diego Fuser
- (Latvia national football team) Vitālijs Astafjevs
- (Latvia national football team) Mihails Zemļinskis
- (Lithuania national football team) Tomas Ramelis
- (North Macedonia national football team) Risto Božinov
- (Malta national football team) David Carabott
- (Moldova national football team) Igor Oprea
- (Norway national football team) Øyvind Leonhardsen
- (Norway national football team) Kjetil Rekdal
- (Poland national football team) Jerzy Brzęczek
- (Poland national football team) Sylwester Czereszewski
- (Portugal national football team) Pauleta
- (Portugal national football team) Abel Xavier
- (Republic of Ireland national football team) Gary Breen
- (Republic of Ireland national football team) Roy Keane
- (Romania national football team) Gheorghe Hagi
- (Romania national football team) Laurențiu Roșu
- (Russia national football team) Aleksandr Panov
- (Scotland national football team) Allan Johnston
- (Slovakia national football team) Peter Dubovský
- (Slovakia national football team) Martin Fabuš
- (Slovakia national football team) Vladimír Labant
- (Slovakia national football team) Róbert Tomaschek
- (Slovenia national football team) Milenko Ačimovič
- (Spain national football team) Fran
- (Spain national football team) César Martín
- (Spain national football team) Fernando Morientes
- (Sweden men's national football team) Niclas Alexandersson
- (Sweden men's national football team) Johan Mjällby
- (Turkey national football team) Oktay Derelioğlu
- (Ukraine national football team) Andriy Husin
- (Ukraine national football team) Serhiy Popov
- (Ukraine national football team) Andriy Shevchenko
- (Ukraine national football team) Serhiy Skachenko

1 goal

- (Albania national football team) Bledar Kola
- (Albania national football team) Devi Muka
- (Albania national football team) Altin Rraklli
- (Andorra national football team) Jesús Julián Lucendo
- (Andorra national football team) Justo Ruiz
- (Andorra national football team) Juli Sánchez
- (Armenia national football team) Garnik Avalyan
- (Armenia national football team) Karapet Mikaelyan
- (Armenia national football team) Artur Petrosyan
- (Austria national football team) Martin Amerhauser
- (Austria national football team) Martin Hiden
- (Azerbaijan national football team) Mirbağır İsayev
- (Azerbaijan national football team) Vyacheslav Lychkin
- (Belarus national football team) Vasili Baranov
- (Belarus national football team) Sergei Gurenko
- (Bosnia and Herzegovina national football team) Sergej Barbarez
- (Bosnia and Herzegovina national football team) Meho Kodro
- (Bosnia and Herzegovina national football team) Muhamed Konjić
- (Bosnia and Herzegovina national football team) Marko Topić
- (Bulgaria national football team) Daniel Borimirov
- (Bulgaria national football team) Rumen Hristov
- (Bulgaria national football team) Georgi Markov
- (Bulgaria national football team) Ivaylo Petkov
- (Bulgaria national football team) Hristo Stoichkov
- (Bulgaria national football team) Ivaylo Yordanov
- (Croatia national football team) Alen Bokšić
- (Croatia national football team) Dario Šimić
- (Croatia national football team) Zvonimir Soldo
- (Cyprus national football team) Marios Christodoulou
- (Cyprus national football team) Costas Costa
- (Cyprus national football team) Siniša Gogić
- (Cyprus national football team) Vassos Melanarkitis
- (Czech Republic national football team) Miroslav Baranek
- (Czech Republic national football team) Michal Horňák
- (Czech Republic national football team) Karel Poborský
- (Czech Republic national football team) Tomáš Řepka
- (Czech Republic national football team) Pavel Verbíř
- (Denmark national football team) Søren Frederiksen
- (Denmark national football team) Jan Heintze
- (Denmark national football team) Allan Nielsen
- (Denmark national football team) Ole Tobiasen
- (Denmark national football team) Morten Wieghorst
- (England national football team) Gareth Southgate
- (Estonia national football team) Argo Arbeiter
- (Estonia national football team) Sergei Hohlov-Simson
- (Estonia national football team) Urmas Kirs
- (Estonia national football team) Raio Piiroja
- (Estonia national football team) Maksim Smirnov
- (Estonia national football team) Kristen Viikmäe
- (Faroe Islands national football team) Hans Fróði Hansen
- (Faroe Islands national football team) John Petersen
- (Finland national football team) Sami Hyypiä
- (Finland national football team) Jari Litmanen
- (Finland national football team) Janne Salli
- (Finland national football team) Hannu Tihinen
- (Serbia and Montenegro national football team) Ljubinko Drulović
- (Serbia and Montenegro national football team) Darko Kovačević
- (Serbia and Montenegro national football team) Dejan Savićević
- (France national football team) Nicolas Anelka
- (France national football team) Alain Boghossian
- (France national football team) Vincent Candela
- (France national football team) Lilian Laslandes
- (France national football team) Frank Leboeuf
- (France national football team) Emmanuel Petit
- (France national football team) Robert Pires
- (France national football team) David Trezeguet
- (France national football team) Zinedine Zidane
- (Georgia national football team) Archil Arveladze
- (Georgia national football team) Mikheil Kavelashvili
- (Georgia national football team) Temur Ketsbaia
- (Germany national football team) Jens Jeremies
- (Germany national football team) Oliver Neuville
- (Germany national football team) Mehmet Scholl
- (Greece national football team) Kostas Frantzeskos
- (Greece national football team) Nikos Liberopoulos
- (Greece national football team) Dimitris Mavrogenidis
- (Greece national football team) Demis Nikolaidis
- (Greece national football team) Andreas Niniadis
- (Greece national football team) Marinos Ouzounidis
- (Hungary national football team) Pál Dárdai
- (Hungary national football team) Gábor Egressy
- (Hungary national football team) Miklós Fehér
- (Hungary national football team) Ferenc Horváth
- (Hungary national football team) János Hrutka
- (Hungary national football team) István Pisont
- (Hungary national football team) József Sebők
- (Hungary national football team) Thomas Sowunmi
- (Iceland national football team) Steinar Dagur Adolfsson
- (Iceland national football team) Eiður Guðjohnsen
- (Iceland national football team) Þórður Guðjónsson
- (Iceland national football team) Brynjar Gunnarsson
- (Iceland national football team) Hermann Hreiðarsson
- (Iceland national football team) Rúnar Kristinsson
- (Iceland national football team) Lárus Sigurðsson
- (Israel national football team) Yossi Abukasis
- (Israel national football team) Walid Badir
- (Israel national football team) Tal Banin
- (Israel national football team) Alon Hazan
- (Israel national football team) Nir Sivilia
- (Italy national football team) Enrico Chiesa
- (Italy national football team) Antonio Conte
- (Italy national football team) Paolo Maldini
- (Latvia national football team) Imants Bleidelis
- (Latvia national football team) Igors Stepanovs
- (Latvia national football team) Māris Verpakovskis
- (Liechtenstein national football team) Mario Frick
- (Liechtenstein national football team) Martin Telser
- (Lithuania national football team) Virginijus Baltušnikas
- (Lithuania national football team) Artūras Fomenka
- (Lithuania national football team) Darius Maciulevičius
- (Luxembourg national football team) Marc Birsens
- (Luxembourg national football team) Jean-Pierre Vanek
- (North Macedonia national football team) Gjorgji Hristov
- (North Macedonia national football team) Igor Nikolovski
- (North Macedonia national football team) Dževdet Šainovski
- (North Macedonia national football team) Goran Stavrevski
- (North Macedonia national football team) Srgjan Zaharievski
- (Malta national football team) Brian Said
- (Malta national football team) Nicky Saliba
- (Malta national football team) Paul Sixsmith
- (Malta national football team) Hubert Suda
- (Moldova national football team) Sergiu Epureanu
- (Moldova national football team) Vladimir Gaidamașciuc
- (Moldova national football team) Alexandru Guzun
- (Moldova national football team) Gheorghe Stratulat
- (Moldova national football team) Ion Testemițanu
- (Northern Ireland national football team) Iain Dowie
- (Northern Ireland national football team) Neil Lennon
- (Northern Ireland national football team) Keith Rowland
- (Northern Ireland national football team) Jeff Whitley
- (Norway national football team) Henning Berg
- (Norway national football team) Ståle Solbakken
- (Poland national football team) Tomasz Hajto
- (Poland national football team) Andrzej Juskowiak
- (Poland national football team) Rafał Siadaczka
- (Poland national football team) Mirosław Trzeciak
- (Poland national football team) Artur Wichniarek
- (Portugal national football team) Capucho
- (Portugal national football team) Sérgio Conceição
- (Republic of Ireland national football team) Denis Irwin
- (Republic of Ireland national football team) Mark Kennedy
- (Republic of Ireland national football team) Steve Staunton
- (Romania national football team) Liviu Ciobotariu
- (Romania national football team) Cătălin Munteanu
- (Romania national football team) Florentin Petre
- (Romania national football team) Gheorghe Popescu
- (Romania national football team) Ion Vlădoiu
- (Russia national football team) Dmitri Alenichev
- (Russia national football team) Aleksandr Mostovoi
- (Russia national football team) Yegor Titov
- (Russia national football team) Ilya Tsymbalar
- (Russia national football team) Yevgeni Varlamov
- (Russia national football team) Igor Yanovsky
- (San Marino national football team) Andy Selva
- (Scotland national football team) Craig Burley
- (Scotland national football team) Colin Cameron
- (Scotland national football team) John Collins
- (Scotland national football team) Eoin Jess
- (Scotland national football team) Gary McSwegan
- (Scotland national football team) Paul Ritchie
- (Slovakia national football team) Miroslav Karhan
- (Slovakia national football team) Ľubomír Moravčík
- (Slovakia national football team) Szilárd Németh
- (Slovakia national football team) Miroslav Sovič
- (Slovenia national football team) Aleksander Knavs
- (Slovenia national football team) Milan Osterc
- (Slovenia national football team) Miran Pavlin
- (Slovenia national football team) Sašo Udovič
- (Spain national football team) Gaizka Mendieta
- (Sweden men's national football team) Andreas Andersson
- (Sweden men's national football team) Kennet Andersson
- (Sweden men's national football team) Freddie Ljungberg
- (Switzerland national football team) Patrick Bühlmann
- (Switzerland national football team) Sébastien Fournier
- (Switzerland national football team) Alexandre Rey
- (Turkey national football team) Ogün Temizkanoğlu
- (Turkey national football team) Sergen Yalçın
- (Ukraine national football team) Yuriy Dmytrulin
- (Ukraine national football team) Vitaliy Kosovskyi
- (Ukraine national football team) Vladyslav Vashchuk
- (Wales national football team) Craig Bellamy
- (Wales national football team) Chris Coleman
- (Wales national football team) Ryan Giggs
- (Wales national football team) John Robinson
- (Wales national football team) Dean Saunders
- (Wales national football team) Kit Symons
- (Wales national football team) Ady Williams

1 own goal

- (Austria national football team) Arnold Wetl (against Spain)
- (Bosnia and Herzegovina national football team) Mirsad Hibić (against Estonia)
- (Estonia national football team) Sergei Hohlov-Simson (against Scotland)
- (Estonia national football team) Janek Meet (against Czech Republic)
- (Iceland national football team) Ríkharður Daðason (against France)
- (Liechtenstein national football team) Modestus Haas (against Romania)
- (North Macedonia national football team) Boban Babunski (against FR Yugoslavia)
- (Northern Ireland national football team) Steve Morrow (against Germany)
- (Russia national football team) Yuri Kovtun (against Iceland)
- (San Marino national football team) Mirco Gennari (against Spain)
- (San Marino national football team) Mauro Valentini (against Israel)
- (Scotland national football team) Matt Elliott (against Czech Republic)
- (Slovenia national football team) Rudi Istenič (against Norway)
- (Spain national football team) Fernando Hierro (against Austria)
