= UEFA Euro 2000 qualifying Group 9 =

Standings and results for Group 9 of the UEFA Euro 2000 qualifying tournament.

== Standings ==
Pos	Team	Pld	W	D	L	GF	GA	GD	Pts	Qualification	(Czech Republic)	(Scotland)	(Bosnia and Herzegovina)	(Lithuania)	(Estonia)	(Faroe Islands)
1	Czech Republic	10	10	0	0	26	5	+21	30	Qualify for final tournament	—	3–2	3–0	2–0	4–1	2–0
2	Scotland	10	5	3	2	15	10	+5	18	Advance to play-offs	1–2	—	1–0	3–0	3–2	2–1
3	Bosnia and Herzegovina	10	3	2	5	14	17	−3	11 (Note: Head-to-head points: Bosnia and Herzegovina 7, Lithuania 6, Estonia 4.)		1–3	1–2	—	2–0	1–1	1–0
4	Lithuania	10	3	2	5	8	16	−8	11		0–4	0–0	4–2	—	1–2	0–0
5	Estonia	10	3	2	5	15	17	−2	11		0–2	0–0	1–4	1–2	—	5–0
6	Faroe Islands	10	0	3	7	4	17	−13	3		0–1	1–1	2–2	0–1	0–2	—

Source: UEFA
Rules for classification: Qualification tiebreakers

== Matches ==
4 June 1998
19:15 UTC+3

Estonia	5–0	Faroe Islands
Viikmäe 12'; Reim 40' (pen.); Terehhov 75'; Oper 86'; Kirs 90'	Report

Kadrioru Stadium, Tallinn
Attendance: 1,500
Referee: Martin Ingvarsson (Sweden)

19 August 1998
20:30 UTC+2

Bosnia and Herzegovina	1–0	Faroe Islands
Baljić 65'	Report

Koševo Stadium, Sarajevo
Attendance: 20,000
Referee: Tomasz Mikulski (Poland)

5 September 1998
15:00 UTC+2

Lithuania	0–0	Scotland
	Report

Žalgiris Stadium, Vilnius
Attendance: 4,500
Referee: Constantin Zotta (Romania)
5 September 1998
20:30 UTC+2

Bosnia and Herzegovina	1–1	Estonia
Barbarez 74' (pen.)	Report	Hibić 29' (o.g.)

Koševo Stadium, Sarajevo
Attendance: 14,750
Referee: Charles Agius (Malta)
6 September 1998
15:00 UTC+1

Faroe Islands	0–1	Czech Republic
	Report	Šmicer 87'

Svangaskarð, Toftir
Attendance: 2,589
Referee: Juha Hirviniemi (Finland)

10 October 1998
17:45 UTC+2

Bosnia and Herzegovina	1–3	Czech Republic
Topić 87'	Report	Baranek 12'; Šmicer 58'; Kuka 90'

Koševo Stadium, Sarajevo
Attendance: 28,000
Referee: Domenico Messina (Italy)
10 October 1998
19:00 UTC+2

Lithuania	0–0	Faroe Islands
	Report

Žalgiris Stadium, Vilnius
Attendance: 800
Referee: Charles Schaak (Luxembourg)
10 October 1998
15:00 UTC+1

Scotland	3–2	Estonia
Dodds 70', 85'; Hohlov-Simson 79' (o.g.)	Report	Hohlov-Simson 34'; Smirnov 76'

Tynecastle Park, Edinburgh
Attendance: 16,930
Referee: Joaquim Bento Marques (Portugal)

14 October 1998
17:00 UTC+2

Czech Republic	4–1	Estonia
Nedvěd 8'; Berger 20', 38'; Meet 45' (o.g.)	Report	Arbeiter 90+1'

Na Stínadlech, Teplice
Attendance: 13,123
Referee: Eyjólfur Ólafsson (Iceland)
14 October 1998
19:00 UTC+2

Lithuania	4–2	Bosnia and Herzegovina
Ivanauskas 10', 67', 75'; Baltušnikas 90'	Report	Konjić 4'; Baljić 68'

Žalgiris Stadium, Vilnius
Attendance: 1,000
Referee: Manfred Schüttengruber (Austria)
14 October 1998
20:00 UTC+1

Scotland	2–1	Faroe Islands
Burley 21'; Dodds 44'	Report	Petersen 85' (pen.)

Pittodrie Stadium, Aberdeen
Attendance: 18,517
Referee: Costas Kapitanis (Cyprus)

27 March 1999
16:00 UTC+1

Czech Republic	2–0	Lithuania
Horňák 10'; Berger 74' (pen.)	Report

Na Stínadlech, Teplice
Attendance: 14,658
Referee: Attila Juhos (Hungary)

31 March 1999
17:00 UTC+2

Lithuania	1–2	Estonia
Fomenka 83'	Report	Terehhov 49', 77'

Žalgiris Stadium, Vilnius
Attendance: 2,000
Referee: Alfredo Trentalange (Italy)
31 March 1999
20:00 UTC+1

Scotland	1–2	Czech Republic
Jess 68'	Report	Elliott 27' (o.g.); Šmicer 35'

Celtic Park, Glasgow
Attendance: 44,513
Referee: Kim Milton Nielsen (Denmark)

5 June 1999
20:30 UTC+2

Bosnia and Herzegovina	2–0	Lithuania
Kodro 26'; Bolić 90'	Report

Koševo Stadium, Sarajevo
Attendance: 6,100
Referee: Arturo Daudén Ibáñez (Spain)
5 June 1999
19:00 UTC+3

Estonia	0–2	Czech Republic
	Report	Berger 45'; Koller 86'

Kadrioru Stadium, Tallinn
Attendance: 2,925
Referee: Juan Ansuátegui Roca (Spain)
5 June 1999
17:00 UTC+1

Faroe Islands	1–1	Scotland
H.Hansen 86'	Report	Johnston 38'

Svangaskarð, Toftir
Attendance: 4,101
Referee: Philippe Kalt (France)

9 June 1999
20:30 UTC+2

Czech Republic	3–2	Scotland
Řepka 65'; Kuka 75'; Koller 87'	Report	Ritchie 30'; Johnston 62'

Letenský Stadion, Prague
Attendance: 21,149
Referee: Hellmut Krug (Germany)
9 June 1999
19:00 UTC+3

Estonia	1–2	Lithuania
Oper 8'	Report	Ramelis 52'; Maciulevičius 56'

Kadrioru Stadium, Tallinn
Attendance: 1,500
Referee: Hermann Albrecht (Germany)
9 June 1999
19:00 UTC+1

Faroe Islands	2–2	Bosnia and Herzegovina
Arge 37', 48'	Report	Bolić 13', 50'

Svangaskarð, Toftir
Attendance: 4,800
Referee: Peter Jones (England)

4 September 1999
20:30 UTC+2

Bosnia and Herzegovina	1–2	Scotland
Bolić 23'	Report	Hutchison 13'; Dodds 45'

Koševo Stadium, Sarajevo
Attendance: 15,600
Referee: Nikolai Levnikov (Russia)
4 September 1999
17:00 UTC+1

Faroe Islands	0–2	Estonia
	Report	Reim 88'; Piiroja 90'

Tórsvøllur, Tórshavn
Attendance: 2,300
Referee: Edo Trivković (Croatia)
4 September 1999
19:00 UTC+2

Lithuania	0–4	Czech Republic
	Report	Nedvěd 60', 63'; Koller 69', 90'

Žalgiris Stadium, Vilnius
Attendance: 4,500
Referee: Jacek Granat (Poland)

8 September 1999
20:30 UTC+2

Czech Republic	3–0	Bosnia and Herzegovina
Koller 26'; Berger 59' (pen.); Poborský 67'	Report

Na Stínadlech, Teplice
Attendance: 10,112
Referee: Karl-Erik Nilsson (Sweden)
8 September 1999
18:00 UTC+3

Estonia	0–0	Scotland
	Report

Kadrioru Stadium, Tallinn
Attendance: 4,500
Referee: Fritz Stuchlik (Austria)
8 September 1999
17:00 UTC+1

Faroe Islands	0–1	Lithuania
	Report	Ramelis 55'

Tórsvøllur, Tórshavn
Attendance: 680
Referee: Eric Romain (Belgium)

5 October 1999 (Note: Originally to be played in 27 March 1999, postponed because of the disruption caused to travel from the Balkan region by the Nato air strikes on Serbia.)
20:00 UTC+1

Scotland	1–0	Bosnia and Herzegovina
Collins 26' (pen.)	Report

Ibrox Stadium, Glasgow
Attendance: 30,574
Referee: Leif Sundell (Sweden)

9 October 1999
20:15 UTC+2

Czech Republic	2–0	Faroe Islands
Koller 11'; Verbíř 84'	Report

Letenský Stadion, Prague
Attendance: 21,362
Referee: Marcel Lică (Romania)
9 October 1999
16:00 UTC+3

Estonia	1–4	Bosnia and Herzegovina
Oper 4'	Report	Baljić 42', 57', 67', 87'

Kadrioru Stadium, Tallinn
Attendance: 800
Referee: Roelof Luinge (Netherlands)
9 October 1999
14:00 UTC+1

Scotland	3–0	Lithuania
Hutchison 48'; McSwegan 50'; Cameron 89'	Report

Hampden Park, Glasgow
Attendance: 22,059
Referee: Stéphane Bré (France)

== Goalscorers ==
There were 82 goals scored in 30 matches, for an average of 2.73 goals per match.

6 goals

- (Bosnia and Herzegovina) Elvir Baljić
- (Czech Republic) Jan Koller

5 goals

- (Czech Republic) Patrik Berger

4 goals

- (Bosnia and Herzegovina) Elvir Bolić
- (Scotland) Billy Dodds

3 goals

- (Czech Republic) Pavel Nedvěd
- (Czech Republic) Vladimír Šmicer
- (Estonia) Andres Oper
- (Estonia) Sergei Terehhov
- (Lithuania) Valdas Ivanauskas

2 goals

- (Czech Republic) Pavel Kuka
- (Estonia) Martin Reim
- (Faroe Islands) Uni Arge
- (Lithuania) Tomas Ramelis
- (Scotland) Don Hutchison
- (Scotland) Allan Johnston

1 goal

- (Bosnia and Herzegovina) Sergej Barbarez
- (Bosnia and Herzegovina) Meho Kodro
- (Bosnia and Herzegovina) Muhamed Konjić
- (Bosnia and Herzegovina) Marko Topić
- (Czech Republic) Miroslav Baranek
- (Czech Republic) Michal Horňák
- (Czech Republic) Karel Poborský
- (Czech Republic) Tomáš Řepka
- (Czech Republic) Pavel Verbíř
- (Estonia) Argo Arbeiter
- (Estonia) Sergei Hohlov-Simson
- (Estonia) Urmas Kirs
- (Estonia) Raio Piiroja
- (Estonia) Maksim Smirnov
- (Estonia) Kristen Viikmäe
- (Faroe Islands) Hans Fróði Hansen
- (Faroe Islands) John Petersen
- (Lithuania) Virginijus Baltušnikas
- (Lithuania) Artūras Fomenka
- (Lithuania) Darius Maciulevičius
- (Scotland) Craig Burley
- (Scotland) Colin Cameron
- (Scotland) John Collins
- (Scotland) Eoin Jess
- (Scotland) Gary McSwegan
- (Scotland) Paul Ritchie

1 own goal

- (Bosnia and Herzegovina) Mirsad Hibić (against Estonia)
- (Estonia) Sergei Hohlov-Simson (against Scotland)
- (Estonia) Janek Meet (against Czech Republic)
- (Scotland) Matt Elliott (against Czech Republic)
