= UEFA Euro 2000 qualifying Group 2 =

Standings and results for Group 2 of the UEFA Euro 2000 qualifying tournament.

== Standings ==
| Pos | Team | Pld | W | D | L | GF | GA | GD | Pts | Qualification | (Norway) | (Slovenia) | (Greece) | (Latvia) | (Albania) | (Georgia (country)) |
|---|---|---|---|---|---|---|---|---|---|---|---|---|---|---|---|---|
| 1 | Norway | 10 | 8 | 1 | 1 | 21 | 9 | +12 | 25 | Qualify for final tournament | — | 4–0 | 1–0 | 1–3 | 2–2 | 1–0 |
| 2 | Slovenia | 10 | 5 | 2 | 3 | 12 | 14 | −2 | 17 | Advance to play-offs | 1–2 | — | 0–3 | 1–0 | 2–0 | 2–1 |
| 3 | Greece | 10 | 4 | 3 | 3 | 13 | 8 | +5 | 15 | | 0–2 | 2–2 | — | 1–2 | 2–0 | 3–0 |
| 4 | Latvia | 10 | 3 | 4 | 3 | 13 | 12 | +1 | 13 | | 1–2 | 1–2 | 0–0 | — | 0–0 | 1–0 |
| 5 | Albania | 10 | 1 | 4 | 5 | 8 | 14 | −6 | 7 | | 1–2 | 0–1 | 0–0 | 3–3 | — | 2–1 |
| 6 | Georgia | 10 | 1 | 2 | 7 | 8 | 18 | −10 | 5 | | 1–4 | 1–1 | 1–2 | 2–2 | 1–0 | — |

Source: UEFA
Rules for classification: Qualification tiebreakers

== Matches ==
5 September 1998
19:00 UTC+5

| Georgia | 1–0 | Albania |
|---|---|---|
| A. Arveladze 66' | Report |

Boris Paichadze National Stadium, Tbilisi
Attendance: 25,000
Referee: Claude Détruche (Switzerland)
6 September 1998
20:00 UTC+3

| Greece | 2–2 | Slovenia |
|---|---|---|
| Machlas 55' (pen.); Frantzeskos 58' | Report | Zahovič 18', 72' |

Spiros Louis Stadium, Athens
Attendance: 28,908
Referee: Alfredo Trentalange (Italy)
6 September 1998
20:15 UTC+2

| Norway | 1–3 | Latvia |
|---|---|---|
| Solbakken 17' | Report | Pahars 11'; Štolcers 53'; Zemļinskis 64' (pen.) |

Ulleval, Oslo
Attendance: 11,031
Referee: Sergei Shmolik (Belarus)

10 October 1998
18:30 UTC+3

| Latvia | 1–0 | Georgia |
|---|---|---|
| Štolcers 2' | Report |

Daugava Stadium, Riga
Attendance: 1,900
Referee: Constantin Zotta (Romania)
10 October 1998
20:00 UTC+2

| Slovenia | 1–2 | Norway |
|---|---|---|
| Zahovič 24' | Report | Flo 45'; Rekdal 80' |

Bežigrad Stadium, Ljubljana
Attendance: 6,200
Referee: Andreas Schluchter (Switzerland)

14 October 1998
18:00 UTC+3

| Greece | 3–0 | Georgia |
|---|---|---|
| Machlas 12'; Liberopoulos 15'; Ouzounidis 36' | Report |

Spiros Louis Stadium, Athens
Attendance: 12,681
Referee: Atanas Uzunov (Bulgaria)
14 October 1998
19:00 UTC+2

| Norway | 2–2 | Albania |
|---|---|---|
| Rekdal 81'; H. Berg 86' | Report | Bushi 37'; Tare 52' |

Ullevaal, Oslo
Attendance: 17,770
Referee: Gerd Grabher (Austria)
14 October 1998
20:00 UTC+2

| Slovenia | 1–0 | Latvia |
|---|---|---|
| Udovič 86' | Report |

Ljudski vrt, Maribor
Attendance: 3,292
Referee: Karen Nalbandyan (Armenia)

18 November 1998
15:00 UTC+1

| Albania | 0–0 | Greece |
|---|---|---|
| | Report |

Qemal Stafa Stadium, Tirana
Attendance: 18,670
Referee: Victor José Esquinas Torres (Spain)

27 March 1999
20:00 UTC+4

| Georgia | 1–1 | Slovenia |
|---|---|---|
| Janashia 42' | Report | Knavs 52' |

Boris Paichadze National Stadium, Tbilisi
Attendance: 12,000
Referee: Alain Hamer (Luxembourg)
27 March 1999
19:30 UTC+2

| Greece | 0–2 | Norway |
|---|---|---|
| | Report | Solskjær 37', 86' |

Spiros Louis Stadium, Athens
Attendance: 42,566
Referee: Leslie Irvine (Northern Ireland)

31 March 1999
20:00 UTC+3

| Latvia | 0–0 | Greece |
|---|---|---|
| | Report |

Daugava Stadium, Riga
Attendance: 5,100
Referee: Knud Erik Fisker (Denmark)

28 April 1999
19:00 UTC+3

| Latvia | 0–0 | Albania |
|---|---|---|
| | Report |

Daugava Stadium, Riga
Attendance: 2,700
Referee: Eric Romain (Belgium)
28 April 1999
21:00 UTC+5

| Georgia | 1–4 | Norway |
|---|---|---|
| Janashia 57' | Report | Iversen 16'; Flo 25', 35'; Solskjær 37' |

Boris Paichadze National Stadium, Tbilisi
Attendance: 14,000
Referee: Sándor Puhl (Hungary)

30 May 1999
19:15 UTC+2

| Norway | 1–0 | Georgia |
|---|---|---|
| Iversen 4' | Report |

Ullevaal, Oslo
Attendance: 18,236
Referee: Luc Huyghe (Belgium)

5 June 1999
21:00 UTC+5

| Georgia | 1–2 | Greece |
|---|---|---|
| Ketsbaia 55' | Report | Frantzeskos 85'; Machlas 89' |

Boris Paichadze National Stadium, Tbilisi
Attendance: 7,400
Referee: William Young (Scotland)
5 June 1999
18:00 UTC+2

| Albania | 1–2 | Norway |
|---|---|---|
| Tare 16' | Report | Iversen 3'; Flo 83' |

Qemal Stafa Stadium, Tirana
Attendance: 12,000
Referee: Livio Bazzoli (Italy)
5 June 1999
18:30 UTC+3

| Latvia | 1–2 | Slovenia |
|---|---|---|
| Pahars 18' | Report | Zahovič 27', 43' (pen.) |

Daugava Stadium, Riga
Attendance: 2,800
Referee: Juan Manuel Brito Arceo (Spain)

9 June 1999
20:00 UTC+2

| Albania | 0–1 | Slovenia |
|---|---|---|
| | Report | Zahovič 26' (pen.) |

Qemal Stafa Stadium, Tirana
Attendance: 5,100
Referee: Adrian Stoica (Romania)
9 June 1999
21:00 UTC+3

| Greece | 1–2 | Latvia |
|---|---|---|
| Niniadis 37' (pen.) | Report | Verpakovskis 24'; Zemļinskis 90' (pen.) |

Spiros Louis Stadium, Athens
Attendance: 15,135
Referee: Lubomír Puček (Czech Republic)

18 August 1999
20:00 UTC+2

| Slovenia | 2–0 | Albania |
|---|---|---|
| Zahovič 49'; Osterc 80' | Report |

Bežigrad Stadium, Ljubljana
Attendance: 6,900
Referee: Joaquim da Silva (Portugal)

4 September 1999
19:30 UTC+2

| Albania | 3–3 | Latvia |
|---|---|---|
| Bushi 29', 78'; Muka 90' | Report | Astafjevs 20', 62'; Štolcers 70' |

Qemal Stafa Stadium, Tirana
Attendance: 4,000
Referee: Alain Hamer (Luxembourg)
4 September 1999
16:00 UTC+2

| Norway | 1–0 | Greece |
|---|---|---|
| Leonhardsen 34' | Report |

Ullevaal, Oslo
Attendance: 24,133
Referee: Markus Merk (Germany)
4 September 1999
20:00 UTC+2

| Slovenia | 2–1 | Georgia |
|---|---|---|
| Ačimovič 48'; Zahovič 80' | Report | S. Arveladze 55' |

Bežigrad Stadium, Ljubljana
Attendance: 7,000
Referee: Jan Wegereef (Netherlands)

8 September 1999
19:00 UTC+5

| Georgia | 2–2 | Latvia |
|---|---|---|
| S. Arveladze 30'; Kavelashvili 52' | Report | Bleidelis 62'; Stepanovs 90' |

Boris Paichadze National Stadium, Tbilisi
Attendance: 4,500
Referee: Miroslav Radoman (FR Yugoslavia)
8 September 1999
19:15 UTC+2

| Norway | 4–0 | Slovenia |
|---|---|---|
| Istenič 15' (o.g.); Iversen 17'; Solskjær 30'; Leonhardsen 67' | Report |

Ullevaal, Oslo
Attendance: 24,288
Referee: Gilles Veissière (France)

6 October 1999
21:00 UTC+3

| Greece | 2–0 | Albania |
|---|---|---|
| Tsiartas 1'; Georgiadis 87' | Report |

Spiros Louis Stadium, Athens
Attendance: 11,384
Referee: Valentin Ivanov (Russia)

9 October 1999
19:00 UTC+2

| Albania | 2–1 | Georgia |
|---|---|---|
| Rraklli 30'; Kola 36' | Report | S. Arveladze 52' |

Qemal Stafa Stadium, Tirana
Attendance: 650
Referee: Alfred Micallef (Malta)
9 October 1999
20:00 UTC+3

| Latvia | 1–2 | Norway |
|---|---|---|
| Pahars 52' | Report | Solskjær 51'; Flo 85' |

Daugava Stadium, Riga
Attendance: 2,500
Referee: Dietmar Drabek (Austria)
9 October 1999
16:45 UTC+2

| Slovenia | 0–3 | Greece |
|---|---|---|
| | Report | Tsiartas 39'; Georgiadis 43'; Nikolaidis 81' |

Ljudski vrt, Maribor
Attendance: 2,500
Referee: Gamal Al-Ghandour (Egypt)

== Goalscorers ==
There were 75 goals scored in 30 matches, for an average of 2.5 goals per match.

8 goals

- (Slovenia national football team) Zlatko Zahovič

5 goals

- (Norway national football team) Tore André Flo
- (Norway national football team) Ole Gunnar Solskjær

4 goals

- (Norway national football team) Steffen Iversen

3 goals

- (Albania national football team) Alban Bushi
- (Georgia national football team) Shota Arveladze
- (Greece national football team) Nikos Machlas
- (Latvia national football team) Marians Pahars
- (Latvia national football team) Andrejs Štolcers

2 goals

- (Albania national football team) Igli Tare
- (Georgia national football team) Zaza Janashia
- (Greece national football team) Georgios Georgiadis
- (Greece national football team) Vasilios Tsiartas
- (Latvia national football team) Vitālijs Astafjevs
- (Latvia national football team) Mihails Zemļinskis
- (Norway national football team) Øyvind Leonhardsen
- (Norway national football team) Kjetil Rekdal

1 goal

- (Albania national football team) Bledar Kola
- (Albania national football team) Devi Muka
- (Albania national football team) Altin Rraklli
- (Georgia national football team) Archil Arveladze
- (Georgia national football team) Mikheil Kavelashvili
- (Georgia national football team) Temur Ketsbaia
- (Greece national football team) Kostas Frantzeskos
- (Greece national football team) Nikos Liberopoulos
- (Greece national football team) Dimitris Mavrogenidis
- (Greece national football team) Demis Nikolaidis
- (Greece national football team) Andreas Niniadis
- (Greece national football team) Marinos Ouzounidis
- (Latvia national football team) Imants Bleidelis
- (Latvia national football team) Igors Stepanovs
- (Latvia national football team) Māris Verpakovskis
- (Norway national football team) Henning Berg
- (Norway national football team) Ståle Solbakken
- (Slovenia national football team) Milenko Ačimovič
- (Slovenia national football team) Aleksander Knavs
- (Slovenia national football team) Milan Osterc
- (Slovenia national football team) Sašo Udovič

1 own goal

- (Slovenia national football team) Rudi Istenič (against Norway)
