= Kodro =

Kodro is a Bosnian surname. Notable people with the surname include:

- Kenan Kodro (born 1993), Bosnian footballer
- Meho Kodro (born 1967), Bosnian footballer and manager
