= UEFA Euro 2000 qualifying Group 1 =

Football tournament qualification stage

Standings and results for Group 1 of the UEFA Euro 2000 qualifying tournament.

== Standings ==
Pos	Team	Pld	W	D	L	GF	GA	GD	Pts	Qualification	(Italy)	(Denmark)	(Switzerland)	(Wales)	(Belarus)
1	Italy	8	4	3	1	13	5	+8	15	Qualify for final tournament	—	2–3	2–0	4–0	1–1
2	Denmark	8	4	2	2	11	8	+3	14 (Note: Head-to-head points: Denmark 4, Switzerland 1.)	Advance to play-offs	1–2	—	2–1	1–2	1–0
3	Switzerland	8	4	2	2	9	5	+4	14		0–0	1–1	—	2–0	2–0
4	Wales	8	3	0	5	7	16	−9	9		0–2	0–2	0–2	—	3–2
5	Belarus	8	0	3	5	4	10	−6	3		0–0	0–0	0–1	1–2	—

Source: UEFA
Rules for classification: Qualification tiebreakers

== Matches ==
5 September 1998
20:30 UTC+3

Belarus	0–0	Denmark
	Report

Dinamo, Minsk
Attendance: 20,000
Referee: Georg Dardenne (Germany)
5 September 1998
19:45 UTC+1

Wales	0–2	Italy
	Report	Fuser 19'; Vieri 77'

Anfield, Liverpool (Note: Match played at Anfield, Liverpool, due to a lack of suitable stadia for matches against major opponents.)
Attendance: 23,160
Referee: Terje Hauge (Norway)

10 October 1998
20:45 UTC+2

Italy	2–0	Switzerland
Del Piero 19', 61'	Report

Stadio del Friuli, Udine
Attendance: 35,247
Referee: Alain Sars (France)
10 October 1998
19:15 UTC+2

Denmark	1–2	Wales
Frederiksen 58'	Report	Williams 59'; Bellamy 86'

Parken, Copenhagen
Attendance: 36,009
Referee: Sándor Piller (Hungary)

14 October 1998
19:30 UTC+1

Wales	3–2	Belarus
Robinson 14'; Coleman 53'; Symons 84'	Report	Gurenko 20'; Byalkevich 48'

Ninian Park, Cardiff
Attendance: 21,508
Referee: Lawrence Sammut (Malta)
14 October 1998
20:15 UTC+2

Switzerland	1–1	Denmark
Chapuisat 58'	Report	Tobiasen 90'

Hardturm Stadion, Zürich
Attendance: 12,500
Referee: Miroslav Radoman (FR Yugoslavia)

27 March 1999
18:30 UTC+2

Belarus	0–1	Switzerland
	Report	Fournier 72'

Dinamo, Minsk
Attendance: 35,000
Referee: Oğuz Sarvan (Turkey)
27 March 1999
19:15 UTC+1

Denmark	1–2	Italy
Sand 58'	Report	Inzaghi 1'; Conte 70'

Parken Stadium, Copenhagen
Attendance: 41,429
Referee: Antonio López Nieto (Spain)

31 March 1999
20:45 UTC+2

Italy	1–1	Belarus
Inzaghi 31' (pen.)	Report	Byalkevich 24'

Stadio del Conero, Ancona
Attendance: 20,735
Referee: Michel Piraux (Belgium)
31 March 1999
20:15 UTC+2

Switzerland	2–0	Wales
Chapuisat 4', 70'	Report

Letzigrund Stadion, Zürich
Attendance: 13,500
Referee: Miroslav Liba (Czech Republic)

5 June 1999
20:15 UTC+2

Denmark	1–0	Belarus
Heintze 23'	Report

Parken, Copenhagen
Attendance: 24,876
Referee: Lucilio Batista (Portugal)
5 June 1999
20:45 UTC+2

Italy	4–0	Wales
Vieri 7'; Inzaghi 37'; Maldini 40'; Chiesa 89'	Report

Stadio DallAra, Bologna
Attendance: 12,392
Referee: Edgar Steinborn (Germany)

9 June 1999
20:15 UTC+2

Switzerland	0–0	Italy
	Report

Stade Olympique de la Pontaise, Lausanne
Attendance: 13,124
Referee: Graham Poll (England)
9 June 1999
19:30 UTC+1

Wales	0–2	Denmark
	Report	Tommason 84'; Tøfting 89' (pen.)

Anfield, Liverpool
Attendance: 10,956
Referee: Armand Ancion (Belgium)

4 September 1999
19:15 UTC+2

Denmark	2–1	Switzerland
A. Nielsen 54'; Tomasson 81'	Report	Türkyilmaz 79'

Parken, Copenhagen
Attendance: 41,667
Referee: Ryszard Wójcik (Poland)
4 September 1999
17:00 UTC+3

Belarus	1–2	Wales
Baranov 30'	Report	Saunders 42'; Giggs 86'

Dinamo, Minsk
Attendance: 20,400
Referee: Tom Henning Øvrebø (Norway)

8 September 1999
20:45 UTC+2

Italy	2–3	Denmark
Fuser 10'; Vieri 34'	Report	Jørgensen 39' (pen.); Wieghorst 57'; Tomasson 63'

Stadio San Paolo, Naples
Attendance: 48,919
Referee: Dick Jol (Netherlands)
8 September 1999
20:15 UTC+2

Switzerland	2–0	Belarus
Türkyilmaz 68', 86' (pen.)	Report

Stade Olympique de la Pontaise, Lausanne
Attendance: 12,500
Referee: Leslie Irvine (Northern Ireland)

9 October 1999
20:30 UTC+3

Belarus	0–0	Italy
	Report

Dinamo, Minsk
Attendance: 25,500
Referee: Claude Colombo (France)
9 October 1999
19:30 UTC+1

Wales	0–2	Switzerland
	Report	Rey 16'; Bühlmann 59'

Racecourse Ground, Wrexham
Attendance: 5,064
Referee: Spiridon Papadakos (Greece)

== Goalscorers ==
There were 44 goals scored in 20 matches, for an average of 2.2 goals per match.

3 goals

- (Denmark) Jon Dahl Tomasson
- (Italy) Filippo Inzaghi
- (Italy) Christian Vieri
- (Switzerland) Stéphane Chapuisat
- (Switzerland) Kubilay Türkyilmaz

2 goals

- (Belarus) Valyantsin Byalkevich
- (Italy) Alessandro Del Piero
- (Italy) Diego Fuser

1 goal

- (Belarus) Vasili Baranov
- (Belarus) Sergei Gurenko
- (Denmark) Søren Frederiksen
- (Denmark) Jan Heintze
- (Denmark) Martin Jørgensen
- (Denmark) Allan Nielsen
- (Denmark) Ebbe Sand
- (Denmark) Ole Tobiasen
- (Denmark) Stig Tøfting
- (Denmark) Morten Wieghorst
- (Italy) Enrico Chiesa
- (Italy) Antonio Conte
- (Italy) Paolo Maldini
- (Switzerland) Patrick Bühlmann
- (Switzerland) Sébastien Fournier
- (Switzerland) Alexandre Rey
- (Wales) Craig Bellamy
- (Wales) Chris Coleman
- (Wales) Ryan Giggs
- (Wales) John Robinson
- (Wales) Dean Saunders
- (Wales) Kit Symons
- (Wales) Ady Williams
