= UEFA Euro 2000 qualifying play-offs =

Football tournament qualifying stage

The UEFA Euro 2000 qualifying play-offs were the last round of qualifying competition for UEFA Euro 2000. They were contested by the eight lowest-ranked runners-up from the nine first round groups of the UEFA Euro 2000 qualifying tournament. The winners of each of four home and away ties qualified for the final tournament in Belgium and Netherlands. The matches were played on 13 and 17 November 1999.

== Ranking of second-placed teams ==
The highest ranked second placed team from the groups qualified automatically for the tournament, while the remainder entered the playoffs. As the groups contained different numbers of teams, matches against the fifth and sixth-placed teams in each group were not included in this ranking. As a result, a total of six matches played by each team count toward the purpose of the second-placed ranking table.

Pos	Grp	Team	Pld	W	D	L	GF	GA	GD	Pts	Qualification
1	7	Portugal	6	4	1	1	11	3	+8	13	Qualify for final tournament
2	3	Turkey	6	4	1	1	12	5	+7	13	Advance to play-offs
3	9	Scotland	6	3	1	2	9	6	+3	10	Advance to play-offs
4	1	Denmark	6	3	1	2	10	8	+2	10	Advance to play-offs
5	4	Ukraine	6	2	4	0	6	4	+2	10	Advance to play-offs
6	8	Republic of Ireland	6	3	1	2	6	4	+2	10	Advance to play-offs
7	6	Israel	6	2	1	3	12	9	+3	7	Advance to play-offs
8	5	England	6	1	4	1	5	4	+1	7	Advance to play-offs
9	2	Slovenia	6	2	1	3	6	12	−6	7	Advance to play-offs

Source: RSSSF
Rules for classification: Counting only matches against teams ranked first to fourth in the group, 1) Points; 2) Goal difference; 3) Goals scored; 4) Away goals scored; 5) Drawing of lots.

== Draw ==
The draw for the play-offs was held on 13 October 1999 in Aachen, Germany, to determine the four pairings as well as the order of the home and away ties. No seeding system was used, making the draw an open one. This decision was announced by UEFA the day before the draw was made.

== Summary ==
Team 1	Agg.	Team 2	1st leg	2nd leg
Scotland	1–2	England	0–2	1–0
Israel	0–8	Denmark	0–5	0–3
Slovenia	3–2	Ukraine	2–1	1–1
Republic of Ireland	1–1 (a)	Turkey	1–1	0–0

== Matches ==
13 November 1999
14:00 UTC±0

Scotland	0–2	England
	Report	Scholes 21', 42'

Hampden Park, Glasgow
Attendance: 50,132
Referee: Manuel Díaz Vega (Spain)
17 November 1999
20:00 UTC±0

England	0–1	Scotland
	Report	Hutchison 39'

Wembley Stadium, London
Attendance: 75,848
Referee: Pierluigi Collina (Italy)

England won 2–1 on aggregate.

13 November 1999
20:05 UTC+2

Israel	0–5	Denmark
	Report	Tomasson 2', 34'; Tøfting 67'; Jørgensen 68'; Steen Nielsen 73'

Ramat Gan Stadium, Ramat Gan
Attendance: 42,000
Referee: David Elleray (England)
17 November 1999
19:15 UTC+1

Denmark	3–0	Israel
Sand 4'; Steen Nielsen 14'; Tomasson 64'	Report

Parken Stadium, Copenhagen
Attendance: 41,186
Referee: Vítor Melo Pereira (Portugal)

Denmark won 8–0 on aggregate.

13 November 1999
19:00 UTC+1

Slovenia	2–1	Ukraine
Zahovič 53'; Ačimovič 83'	Report	Shevchenko 33'

Bežigrad Stadium, Ljubljana
Attendance: 9,000
Referee: Urs Meier (Switzerland)
17 November 1999
19:00 UTC+2

Ukraine	1–1	Slovenia
Rebrov 68' (pen.)	Report	Pavlin 78'

Olympic Stadium, Kyiv
Attendance: 52,800
Referee: Bernd Heynemann (Germany)

Slovenia won 3–2 on aggregate.

13 November 1999
19:00 UTC±0

Republic of Ireland	1–1	Turkey
Rob. Keane 79'	Report	Havutçu 83' (pen.)

Lansdowne Road, Dublin
Attendance: 33,610
Referee: Anders Frisk (Sweden)
17 November 1999
20:00 UTC+2

Turkey	0–0	Republic of Ireland
	Report

Bursa Atatürk Stadium, Bursa
Attendance: 19,900
Referee: Gilles Veissière (France)

1–1 on aggregate. Turkey won on away goals.

== Goalscorers ==
There were 18 goals scored in 8 matches, for an average of 2.25 goals per match.

3 goals

- (Denmark national football team) Jon Dahl Tomasson

2 goals

- (Denmark national football team) Brian Steen Nielsen
- (England national football team) Paul Scholes

1 goal

- (Denmark national football team) Martin Jørgensen
- (Denmark national football team) Ebbe Sand
- (Denmark national football team) Stig Tøfting
- (Republic of Ireland national football team) Robbie Keane
- (Scotland national football team) Don Hutchison
- (Slovenia national football team) Milenko Ačimovič
- (Slovenia national football team) Miran Pavlin
- (Slovenia national football team) Zlatko Zahovič
- (Turkey national football team) Tayfur Havutçu
- (Ukraine national football team) Serhiy Rebrov
- (Ukraine national football team) Andriy Shevchenko
