= Bolo (footballer) =

Spanish footballer and manager (born 1974)

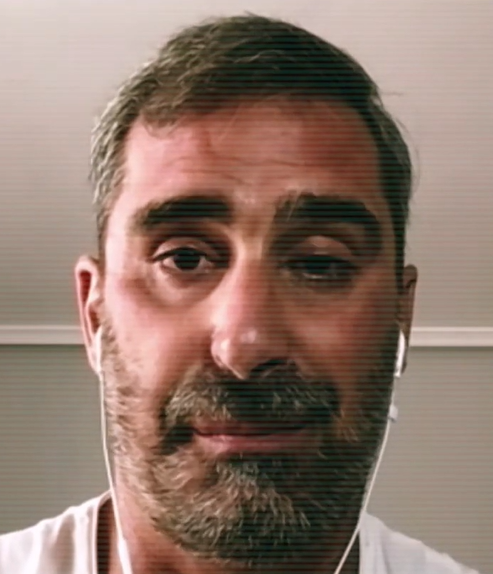
- Bolo in 2020

Personal information
- Full name: Jon Andoni Pérez Alonso
- Date of birth: 5 March 1974 (age 52)
- Place of birth: Bilbao, Spain
- Height: 1.86 m (6 ft 1 in)
- Position: Centre-forward

Youth career
- Danok Bat
- 1991–1993: Athletic Bilbao

Senior career*
Years	Team	Apps	(Gls)
1993–1996	Bilbao Athletic	75	(22)
1994–1998	Athletic Bilbao	42	(4)
1997	→ Osasuna (loan)	7	(0)
1997–1998	→ Hércules (loan)	26	(6)
1998–2004	Rayo Vallecano	192	(43)
2004–2006	Gimnàstic	79	(10)
2006–2008	Numancia	60	(11)
2008–2009	Barakaldo	36	(7)
Total		517	(103)

International career
1996–2003	Basque Country	5	(4)

Managerial career
- 2014–2018: Arenas Getxo
- 2018–2022: Ponferradina
- 2022: Oviedo
- 2023–2024: Burgos
- 2025–2026: Huesca
- * Club domestic league appearances and goals

Jon Andoni Pérez Alonso (born 5 March 1974), known as Bolo, is a Spanish football manager and former player who played as a centre-forward.

In a 16-year professional career, in which he represented six clubs, he appeared in 479 games across the two major levels of Spanish football, scoring 95 goals. He amassed totals of 168 matches and 29 goals in La Liga, with Athletic Bilbao and Rayo Vallecano (four seasons apiece).

== Club career ==
Born in Bilbao, Biscay, Bolo was a product of Lezama, Athletic Bilbao's youth structure. He first appeared with the first team on 20 February 1994 in a 1–0 away defeat against Real Zaragoza, in what would be his sole La Liga appearance of the season.

After a four-year stint with the Basques (with loans to Osasuna and Hércules in the Segunda División included), Bolo went on to play for Rayo Vallecano, where he had his most steady period, appearing in the UEFA Cup in the 2000–01 campaign and being joint-top scorer (alongside Dimitar Berbatov) with seven goals to help his team reach the semi-finals; at times, he formed part of a forward line alongside two Bosnian internationals with very similar names: 'Baljić, Bolić and Bolo'. He suffered consecutive relegations in his last two years, at Gimnàstic de Tarragona and Numancia.

In August 2008, Bolo was released by Numancia as the Soria team returned to the top flight, and returned to the Basque region, signing with Segunda División B side Barakaldo. After only one season, he retired from football at the age of 35, becoming his last club's general manager.

== International career ==
Bolo was never capped by Spain at any level, but represented the Basque Country's non-FIFA team. On 27 December 2003, he scored both goals in a 2–1 win over Uruguay at his hometown's San Mamés Stadium.

== Coaching career ==
Bolo was appointed manager of Arenas de Getxo on 18 March 2014, achieving promotion in his first full season. On 31 May 2018, he was named at the helm of Ponferradina also in the third tier, again promoting in his debut campaign.

On 27 May 2022, Bolo announced that he would leave the club at the end of the season. On 15 June, he took over fellow second-division side Real Oviedo, being dismissed on 16 October.

Bolo replaced the departing Julián Calero at Burgos on 31 May 2023. On 28 October of the following year, he was sacked after a poor start to the campaign.

On 12 November 2025, Bolo was appointed at fellow second-tier Huesca. He was relieved of his duties in March 2026, having collected just 16 points from 17 matches and with the team in the relegation zone.

== Personal life ==
Bolo's son, Adrián (born in Madrid in 2001 while his father was with Rayo), is also a footballer. A central defender, he also came through at Athletic Bilbao.

Bolo's father Juan Antonio was also involved in the sport as a forward. He notably played for Tercera División club Santurtzi, and died on 19 December 2022 at age 79.

== Managerial statistics ==
As of match played 15 March 2026

Managerial record by team and tenure
Team	Nat	From	To	Record								Ref
Team	Nat	From	To	G	W	D	L	GF	GA	GD	Win %	Ref
Arenas Getxo	(Spain)	18 March 2014	31 May 2018	173	68	61	44	241	183	+58	39.31	
Ponferradina	(Spain)	31 May 2018	28 May 2022	176	71	52	53	218	191	+27	40.34	
Oviedo	(Spain)	15 June 2022	16 October 2022	11	2	4	5	5	9	−4	18.18	
Burgos	(Spain)	31 May 2023	28 October 2024	57	22	14	21	69	73	−4	38.60	
Huesca	(Spain)	12 November 2025	16 March 2026	19	5	4	10	21	28	−7	26.32	
Total				436	168	135	133	554	484	+70	38.53	—

== Honours ==
Numancia

- Segunda División: 2007–08

Individual

- UEFA Cup top scorer: 2000–01 (joint)
