= Elvir Bolić =

Bosnian footballer

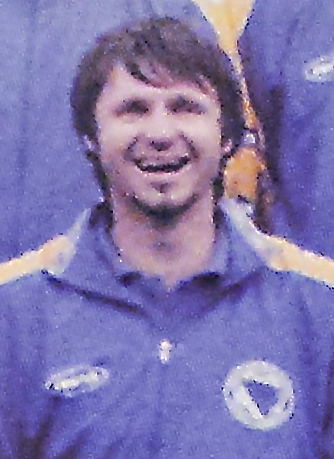
- Bolić in 2002

Personal information
- Date of birth: 10 October 1971 (age 55)
- Place of birth: Zenica, SFR Yugoslavia
- Height: 1.85 m (6 ft 1 in)
- Position: Striker

Senior career*
Years	Team	Apps	(Gls)
1988–1991	Čelik Zenica	48	(22)
1992	Red Star Belgrade	11	(2)
1992	Galatasaray	8	(2)
1993–1995	Gaziantepspor	73	(43)
1995–2000	Fenerbahçe	145	(74)
2000–2003	Rayo Vallecano	98	(22)
2003–2004	İstanbulspor	28	(11)
2004	Gençlerbirliği	16	(2)
2005	Malatyaspor	11	(1)
2005–2006	İstanbulspor	17	(7)
2006	Rijeka	6	(4)
Total		450	(190)

International career
1996–2006	Bosnia and Herzegovina	51	(22)

Managerial career
- 2008: Bosnia and Herzegovina (assistant)
- * Club domestic league appearances and goals

Elvir Bolić (Bosnian pronunciation: [bǒːlitɕ]; born 10 October 1971) is a Bosnian former professional footballer who played as a striker.

He spent most of his 18-year professional career in Turkey, appearing for seven clubs including Galatasaray and Fenerbahçe. He also played three years in Spain, with Rayo Vallecano.

Bolić represented Bosnia and Herzegovina during one full decade.

== Club career ==
=== Čelik and Red Star ===
Born in Zenica, SR Bosnia and Herzegovina, SFR Yugoslavia, Bolić started playing with local NK Čelik, being one of the players in the club that would later represent the independent Bosnian national team, including Senad Brkić, Mirsad Hibić and Nermin Šabić.

In December 1991, Bolić was acquired by Yugoslav powerhouse Red Star Belgrade—European Cup defending champions—after impressing club management, general-secretary Vladimir Cvetković and technical director Dragan Džajić. He scored two goals in 11 games in the Yugoslav First League in his only season. In May 2024, he expressed extreme regret for the events that happened and which made him not stay longer in Red Star in that glorious period of the club.

While at the Yugoslav national side's training camp in France, in June of the following year, 21-year-old Bolić received bad news from his family about the deteriorating situation in Bosnia and the start of the military conflict. He informed the club's directors that he would not be coming back to Belgrade, and he left to Turkey to meet with his agent; Red Star respected his wish, and he subsequently signed with Galatasaray SK.

=== Turkey ===
Bolić moved to Turkey in the summer of 1992, and remained in the nation and its Süper Lig for the following eight years. He started with Galatasaray, going on to represent Gaziantepspor and Fenerbahçe SK, winning the national championship in his first season with the latter team and also reaching the final of the Turkish Cup.

On 30 October 1996, Bolić broke Manchester United's 40-year unbeaten home record playing for Fenerbahçe in Europe when he scored the game's only goal at Old Trafford in the season's UEFA Champions League group stage, where he also netted against SK Rapid Wien (1–1 away draw).

=== Late career ===
Bolić started the 2000s in Spain with Rayo Vallecano, spending three seasons in La Liga with the club and at times forming part of a forward line with another Bosnian and a Basque who all had similar names: 'Baljić, Bolić and Bolo'. In his first year he scored eight in 32 matches, adding seven in the campaign's UEFA Cup to help the Madrid outskirts side reach the quarterfinals, even though four of those came in a 10–0 away routing of amateurs Constel·lació Esportiva.

In 2003, Bolić returned to Turkey for another lengthy spell, joining Istanbulspor in late July. At the end of the season he left for Gençlerbirliği SK, finishing his second stint in the country with Malatyaspor and İstanbulspor.

Bolić started 2006–07 in Croatia with NK Rijeka, but left in September 2006, retiring shortly after at the age of 35.

== International career ==
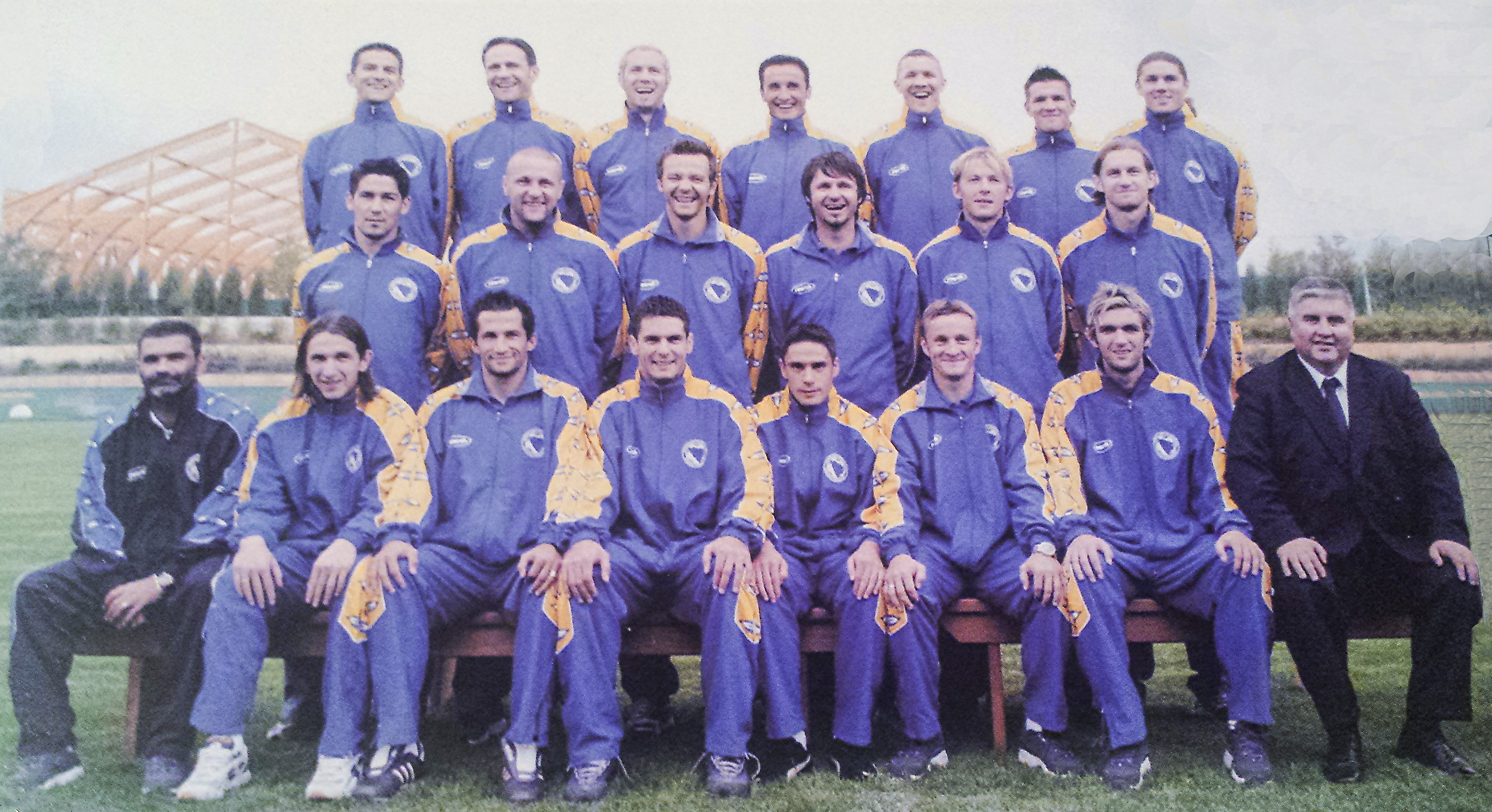
Bosnia and Herzegovina squad during the Euro 2004 qualifying campaign (Bolić fourth from the left, middle row).

Bolić earned 51 caps for Bosnia and Herzegovina, scoring 22 goals. He made his debut in 1996 against Greece and, at the time of his retirement, ranked third in international goals for his country, only trailing Edin Džeko and Zvjezdan Misimović.

On 8 September 2004, Bolić netted the equalizer in a 1–1 home draw with Spain for the 2006 FIFA World Cup qualifiers. His final international was a September 2006 European Championship qualification match against Hungary.

He later briefly worked as assistant coach to the national team, being part of Meho Kodro's coaching staff and leaving his post on 17 May 2008.

== Career statistics ==
Scores and results list Bosnia and Herzegovina's goal tally first, score column indicates score after each Bolić goal.

List of international goals scored by Elvir Bolić
No.	Date	Venue	Opponent	Score	Result	Competition
1	6 November 1996	Asim Ferhatović Hase, Sarajevo, Bosnia and Herzegovina	Italy	2–1	2–1	Friendly
2	10 November 1996	Bežigrad, Ljubljana, Slovenia	Slovenia	1–0	2–1	1998 World Cup qualification
3	5 November 1997	El Menzah, Tunis, Tunisia	Tunisia	1–2	1–2	Friendly
4	20 August 1997	Asim Ferhatović Hase, Sarajevo, Bosnia and Herzegovina	Denmark	2–0	3–0	1998 World Cup qualification
5	20 August 1997	Asim Ferhatović Hase, Sarajevo, Bosnia and Herzegovina	Denmark	3–0	3–0	1998 World Cup qualification
6	10 September 1997	Asim Ferhatović Hase, Sarajevo, Bosnia and Herzegovina	Slovenia	1–0	1–0	1998 World Cup qualification
7	5 June 1999	Asim Ferhatović Hase, Sarajevo, Bosnia and Herzegovina	Lithuania	2–0	2–0	Euro 2000 qualifying
8	9 June 1999	Svangaskarð, Toftir, Faroe Islands	Faroe Islands	1–0	2–2	Euro 2000 qualifying
9	9 June 1999	Svangaskarð, Toftir, Faroe Islands	Faroe Islands	2–2	2–2	Euro 2000 qualifying
10	4 September 1999	Asim Ferhatović Hase, Sarajevo, Bosnia and Herzegovina	Scotland	1–1	1–2	Euro 2000 qualifying
11	16 August 2000	Asim Ferhatović Hase, Sarajevo, Bosnia and Herzegovina	Turkey	1–0	2–0	Friendly
12	27 March 2002	Grbavica, Sarajevo, Bosnia and Herzegovina	Macedonia	1–0	4–4	Friendly
13	27 March 2002	Grbavica, Sarajevo, Bosnia and Herzegovina	Macedonia	4–2	4–4	Friendly
14	29 March 2003	Bilino Polje, Zenica, Bosnia and Herzegovina	Luxembourg	1–0	2–0	Euro 2004 qualifying
15	11 October 2003	Asim Ferhatovic Hase, Sarajevo, Bosnia and Herzegovina	Denmark	1–1	1–1	Euro 2004 qualifying
16	31 March 2004	?, Luxembourg, Luxembourg	Luxembourg	2–0	2–1	Friendly
17	8 September 2004	Bilino Polje, Zenica, Bosnia and Herzegovina	Spain	1–1	1–1	2006 World Cup qualification
18	2 February 2005	?, Teheran, Iran	Iran	1–0	1–2	Friendly
19	30 March 2005	Asim Ferhatović Hase, Sarajevo, Bosnia and Herzegovina	Lithuania	1–0	1–1	2006 World Cup qualification
20	8 October 2005	Bilino Polje, Zenica, Bosnia and Herzegovina	San Marino	1–0	3–0	2006 World Cup qualification
21	8 October 2005	Bilino Polje, Zenica, Bosnia and Herzegovina	San Marino	2–0	3–0	2006 World Cup qualification
22	8 October 2005	Bilino Polje, Zenica, Bosnia and Herzegovina	San Marino	3–0	3–0	2006 World Cup qualification

== Honours ==
Galatasaray

- Süper Lig: 1992–93
- Turkish Cup: 1992–93

Fenerbahçe

- Süper Lig: 1995–96
