= Vasili Baranov =

Belarusian footballer (born 1972)

Personal information
- Full name: Vasili Vasilyevich Baranov
- Date of birth: 5 October 1972 (age 54)
- Place of birth: Pribytki, Byelorussian SSR, Soviet Union
- Height: 1.81 m (5 ft 11 1/2 in)
- Position: Midfielder

Senior career*
Years	Team	Apps	(Gls)
1993–1994	ZLiN Gomel	19	(2)
1994–1995	Vedrich-97 Rechytsa	46	(11)
1996–1998	Baltika Kaliningrad	76	(7)
1998–2003	Spartak Moscow	120	(18)
2003	Spartak-Alania Vladikavkaz	11	(0)
2005–2007	Ryazan	64	(10)

International career
1995–2001	Belarus	25	(3)
- * Club domestic league appearances and goals

Vasili Vasilyevich Baranov (Belarusian: Васіль Васільевіч Баранаў; Russian: Василий Васильевич Баранов; born 5 October 1972 in Pribytki, Gomel Voblast) is a retired Belarusian professional footballer. He made his debut in the Russian Premier League in 1996 for Baltika Kaliningrad. After retiring, he has refused to give interviews.

== Honours ==
- Russian Premier League champion: 1998, 1999, 2000, 2001.
- Russian Premier League bronze: 2002.
- Russian Cup winner: 2003.
- Russian Second Division Zone Center best midfielder: 2005.

== European club competitions ==
- UEFA Intertoto Cup 1998 with Baltika Kaliningrad: 4 games.
- UEFA Champions League 1998–99 with Spartak Moscow : 8 games.
- UEFA Champions League 1999–2000 with Spartak Moscow: 7 games.
- UEFA Cup 1999–2000 with Spartak Moscow: 2 games.
- UEFA Champions League 2000–01 with Spartak Moscow: 7 games.
- UEFA Champions League 2001–02 with Spartak Moscow: 6 games, 1 goal.
- UEFA Champions League 2002–03 with Spartak Moscow: 2 games.

== International goals ==
Belarus score listed first; score column indicates score after each Baranov goal.

No.	Date	Venue	Cap	Opponent	Score	Result	Competition
1	7 June 1998	Dinamo Stadium, Minsk, Belarus	9	Lithuania	4–0	5–0	Friendly
2	9 February 1999	Kiryat Eliezer Stadium, Haifa, Israel	13	Israel	1–1	1–2	Friendly
3	4 September 1999	Dinamo Stadium, Minsk, Belarus	19	Wales	1–0	1–2	UEFA Euro 2000 qualifying
