= Elvir Baljić =

Bosnian footballer and manager (born 1974)

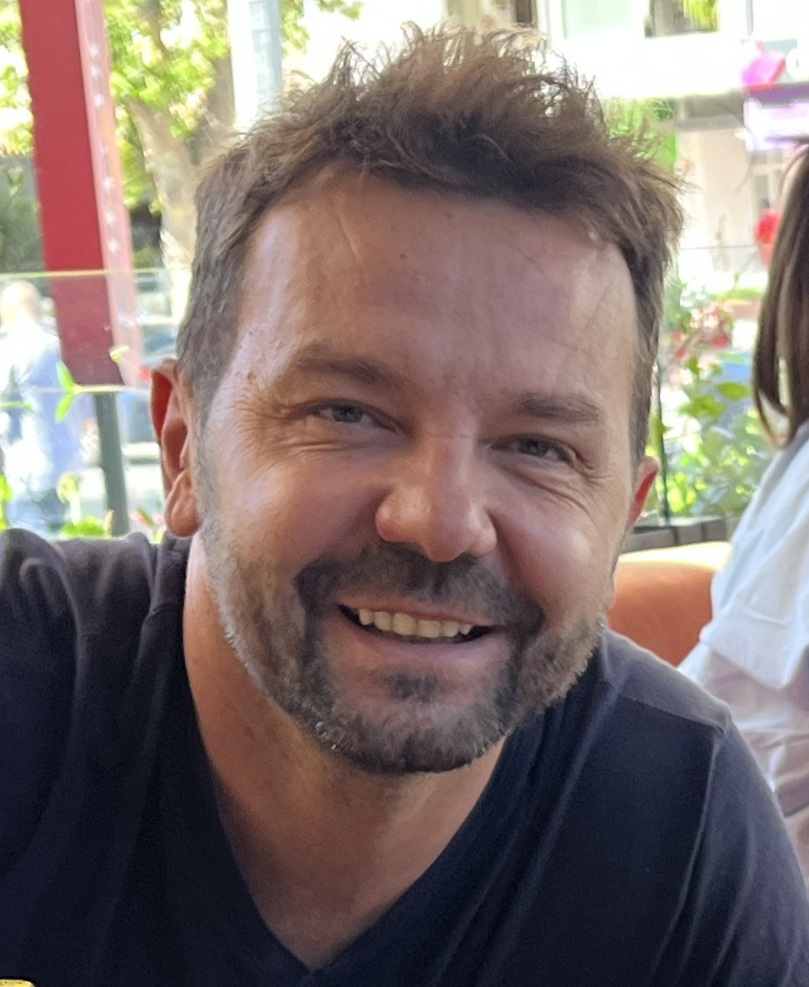
- Baljić in 2023

Personal information
- Date of birth: 8 July 1974 (age 52)
- Place of birth: Sarajevo, SR Bosnia and Herzegovina, SFR Yugoslavia
- Height: 1.85 m (6 ft 1 in)
- Positions: Left winger; second striker

Youth career
- –1993: Željezničar

Senior career*
Years	Team	Apps	(Gls)
1993–1995	Sarajevo	11	(8)
1995–1998	Bursaspor	87	(42)
1998–1999	Fenerbahçe	30	(18)
1999–2002	Real Madrid	11	(1)
2000–2001	→ Fenerbahçe (loan)	27	(5)
2001–2002	→ Rayo Vallecano (loan)	21	(7)
2002–2004	Galatasaray	34	(3)
2005	Konyaspor	14	(2)
2006	Ankaragücü	15	(2)
2006–2008	Istanbulspor	25	(9)
Total		264	(91)

International career
1996–2005	Bosnia and Herzegovina	39	(15)

Managerial career
- 2010–2014: Bosnia and Herzegovina (assistant)
- 2015: Karabükspor
- 2017: Alanyaspor (assistant)
- 2018: Akhisarspor (assistant)
- 2019–2020: Tuzla City
- * Club domestic league appearances and goals

Elvir Baljić (born 8 July 1974) is a Bosnian professional football manager and former player.

As a player, Baljić's biggest success was winning the UEFA Champions League with Spanish giant Real Madrid in the 1999–2000 season & 2001–02 season despite he played only 1 game in the first part of the season and then loaned out during winter transfer. Apart from the UEFA Champions League success, he also won the Turkish Süper Lig with Fenerbahçe in the 2000–01 season.

After ending his playing career, Baljić became an assistant manager of Safet Sušić at the Bosnia and Herzegovina national team, with whom he qualified for the 2014 FIFA World Cup. Baljić briefly managed Turkish club Karabükspor in 2015. After Karabükspor, he was also an assistant of Sušić at Alanyaspor in 2017 and Akhisarspor in 2018. Baljić also managed Bosnian club Tuzla City.

== Club career ==
Baljić transferred to Real Madrid in the summer of 1999 under club president Lorenzo Sanz for €26 million. Throughout the 1999–2000 season, he made eleven league appearances – with eight of them being substitute – scoring just one goal.

In 2001–02 season, Baljić joined compatriots Elvir Bolić and Emir Granov to Rayo Vallecano. At times they formed a forward line consisting of him, Bolić, and Bolo. However, the move did not do much to improve Baljić's standing at the Bernabéu as more injuries, poor form, and even disciplinary issues followed with only one league goal from 10 appearances.

During the 2002 summer transfer window, Baljić's contract with Real Madrid was terminated and he returned to Turkey, this time to Galatasaray. Due to his substantial price tag and the subsequent high-profile failure at Madrid, his acquisition by Real features consistently and prominently on various "worst-ever signing" lists.

== International career ==
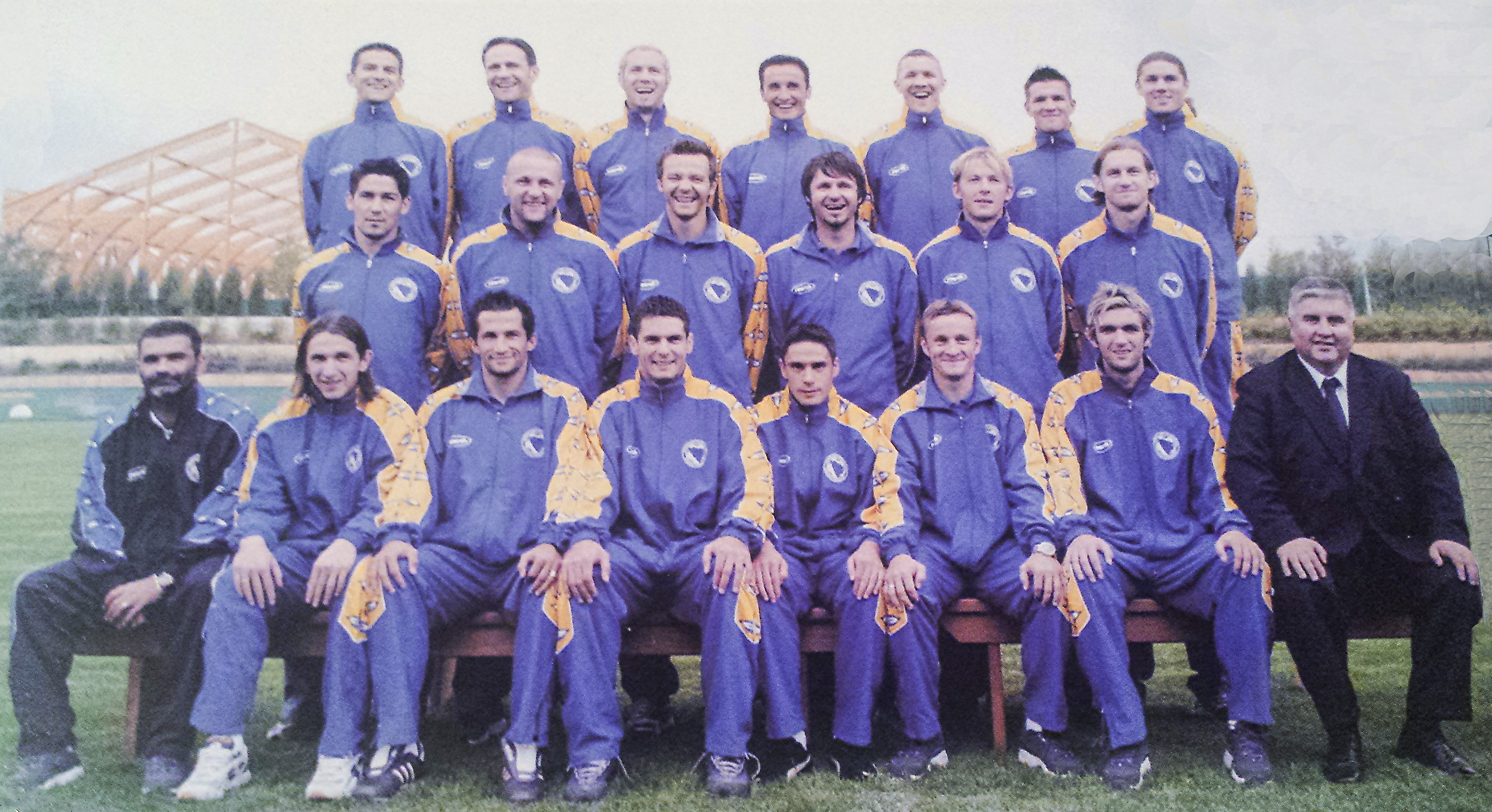
Baljić (second row, third from left) with the Bosnia and Herzegovina squad in March 2003

Baljić debuted for Bosnia and Herzegovina in a friendly match against Albania in April 1996. He has earned a total of 38 caps, scoring 14 goals. He scored four goals in a single official match for Bosnia and Herzegovina in an away match of the Group 9 during the UEFA Euro 2000 qualifying between Estonia and Bosnia and Herzegovina, on 9 October, just a couple of weeks after he signed a contract with Real Madrid. The final result was 1–4. His final international was a March 2005 FIFA World Cup qualification match against Lithuania.

== Managerial career ==
=== Bosnia and Herzegovina ===
Almost two years after finishing his playing career, in February 2010, Bosnia and Herzegovina's national team coach Safet Sušić revealed that Baljić would be one of his assistants. As an assistant, Baljić was part of the historic achievement of the national team, which was qualification to the 2014 FIFA World Cup in Brazil. Baljić left the national team in 2014 with Sušić's departure.

=== Karabükspor ===
On 2 October 2015, Baljić became the new manager of Turkish TFF First League club Karabükspor. Less than three months later, on 21 December, he resigned after a 3–0 league loss against Adanaspor, which was the club's third loss in a row in all competitions and second in a row in the league.

=== Tuzla City ===
On 1 October 2019, Baljić was appointed coach of Bosnian Premier League club Tuzla City. The next day, on 2 October, Baljić officially took over the role of manager of Tuzla City, signing a three-year contract with the club. In his first match as Tuzla City coach, the club won Zvijezda 09 at home 3–0 in a league match on 5 October. He suffered his first loss with Tuzla on 19 October 2019 after the club lost 0–3 against Radnik Bijeljina in another league match.

In his first Tuzla derby, the club drew against city rivals Sloboda Tuzla 1–1 on 30 November 2019. On 9 March 2020, Baljić decided to terminate his contract with Tuzla City after poor results, with the last one being a 1–0 league loss against Željezničar the day earlier.

== Career statistics ==
=== International ===
Appearances and goals by national team and year
National team	Year	Apps	Goals
Bosnia and Herzegovina	1993	1	1
Bosnia and Herzegovina	1994	–	
Bosnia and Herzegovina	1995	–	
Bosnia and Herzegovina	1996	4	0
Bosnia and Herzegovina	1997	5	0
Bosnia and Herzegovina	1998	4	2
Bosnia and Herzegovina	1999	2	4
Bosnia and Herzegovina	2000	3	1
Bosnia and Herzegovina	2001	7	4
Bosnia and Herzegovina	2002	2	1
Bosnia and Herzegovina	2003	4	2
Bosnia and Herzegovina	2004	4	0
Bosnia and Herzegovina	2005	3	0
Total		39	15

Scores and results list Bosnia and Herzegovina's goal tally first, score column indicates score after each Baljić goal.

List of international goals scored by Elvir Baljić
No.	Date	Venue	Opponent	Score	Result	Competition
1	12 September 1993	Azadi Stadium, Tehran, Iran	Iran	?–?	3–1	Friendly
2	12 August 1998	Koševo Stadium, Sarajevo, Bosnia and Herzegovina	Faroe Islands	1–0	1–0	UEFA Euro 2000 qualification
3	14 October 1998	Žalgiris Stadium, Vilnius, Lithuania	Lithuania	2–2	2–4	UEFA Euro 2000 qualification
4	9 October 1999	Kadriorg Stadium, Tallinn, Estonia	Estonia	1–1	4–1	UEFA Euro 2000 qualification
5	9 October 1999	Kadriorg Stadium, Tallinn, Estonia	Estonia	2–1	4–1	UEFA Euro 2000 qualification
6	9 October 1999	Kadriorg Stadium, Tallinn, Estonia	Estonia	3–1	4–1	UEFA Euro 2000 qualification
7	9 October 1999	Kadriorg Stadium, Tallinn, Estonia	Estonia	4–1	4–1	UEFA Euro 2000 qualification
8	2 September 2000	Koševo Stadium, Sarajevo, Bosnia and Herzegovina	Spain	1–1	1–2	2002 FIFA World Cup qualification
9	15 August 2001	Koševo Stadium, Sarajevo, Bosnia and Herzegovina	Malta	1–0	2–0	Friendly
10	15 August 2001	Koševo Stadium, Sarajevo, Bosnia and Herzegovina	Malta	2–0	2–0	Friendly
11	7 October 2001	Koševo Stadium, Sarajevo, Bosnia and Herzegovina	Liechtenstein	2–0	5–0	2002 FIFA World Cup qualification
12	7 October 2001	Koševo Stadium, Sarajevo, Bosnia and Herzegovina	Liechtenstein	4–0	5–0	2002 FIFA World Cup qualification
13	11 October 2002	Koševo Stadium, Sarajevo, Bosnia and Herzegovina	Germany	1–0	1–1	Friendly
14	12 February 2003	Millennium Stadium, Cardiff, Wales	Wales	1–0	2–2	Friendly
15	2 April 2003	Parken Stadium, Copenhagen, Denmark	Denmark	2–0	2–0	UEFA Euro 2004 qualification

== Managerial statistics ==
As of match played 8 March 2020

Managerial record by team and tenure
Team	From	To	Record							
Team	From	To	G	W	D	L	GF	GA	GD	Win %
Karabükspor	2 October 2015	21 December 2015	11	4	3	4	12	14	−2	36.36
Tuzla City	2 October 2019	9 March 2020	12	4	2	6	10	19	−9	33.33
Total			23	8	5	10	22	33	−11	34.78

== Honours ==
=== Player ===
Real Madrid

- UEFA Champions League: 1999–2000, 2001–02

Fenerbahçe

- Süper Lig: 2000–01

Individual

- Bosnian Footballer of the Year: 1998, 1999
- Turkish Footballer of the Year: 1998
