= Zaza Janashia =

Georgian footballer

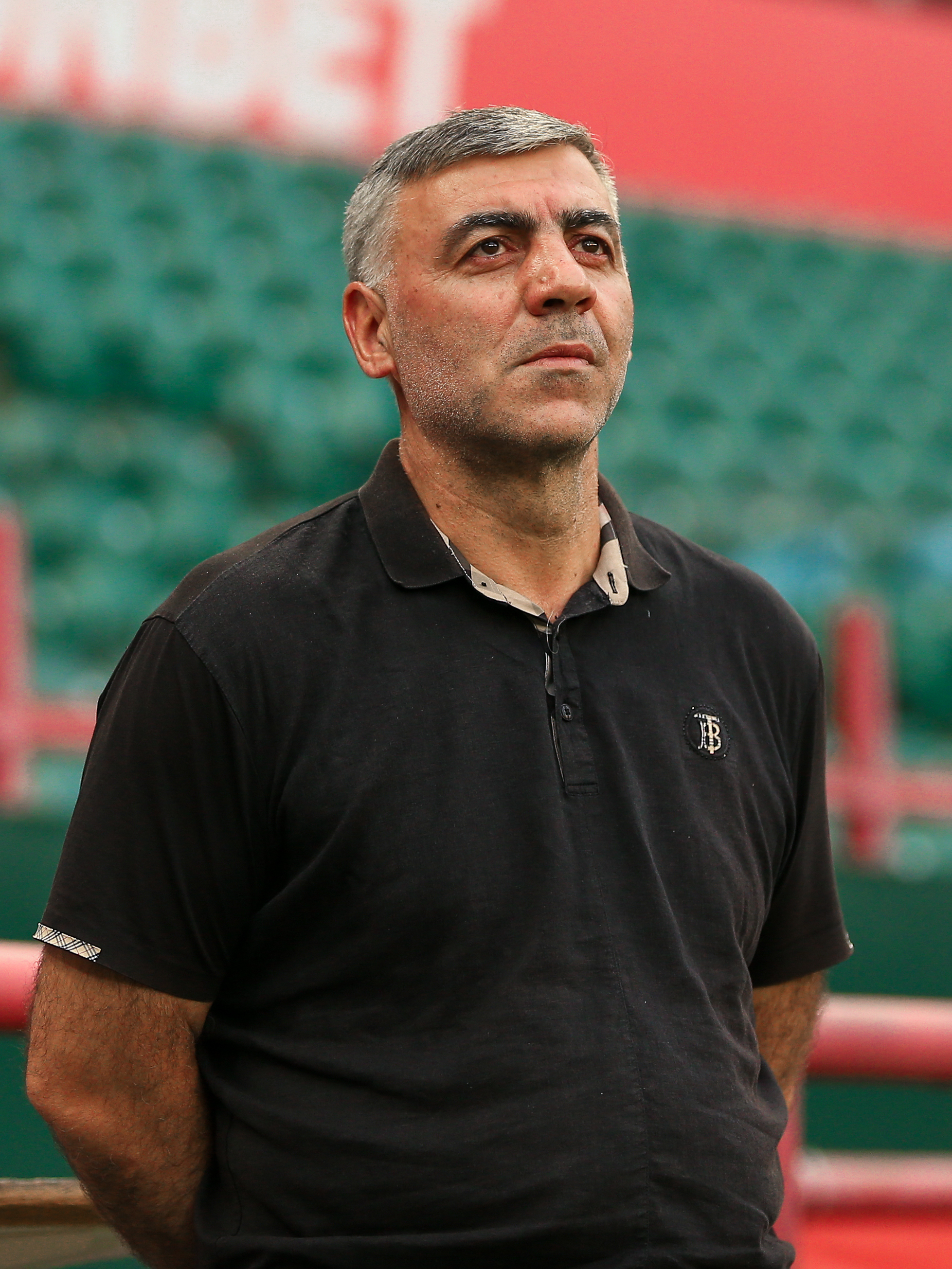
- Janashia in 2023

Personal information
- Date of birth: 10 February 1976 (age 50)
- Place of birth: Tbilisi (GSSR), Soviet Union
- Height: 1.78 m (5 ft 10 in)
- Position: Forward

Senior career*
Years	Team	Apps	(Gls)
1991–1993	Odishi Zugdidi	59	(13)
1993–1994	Shevardeni-1906 Tbilisi	30	(14)
1994–1995	FC Samtredia	23	(17)
1996–2001	Lokomotiv Moscow	145	(33)
2002	Locomotive Tbilisi	22	(6)
2003	Kocaelispor	3	(0)
2004	Baltika Kaliningrad	12	(3)
Total		294	(86)

International career
1997–2001	Georgia	9	(4)
- * Club domestic league appearances and goals

Zaza Janashia (Georgian: ზაზა ჯანაშია; born 10 February 1976) is a Georgian retired professional footballer who played as a forward. He works in the children's sports school "Lokomotiv-Perovo" in Moscow.

== Club career ==
In Lokomotiv Moscow's 1998–99 UEFA Cup Winners' Cup campaign, he scored to put Lokomotiv ahead 1–0 in their first semifinal game against Lazio. Lazio equalized and then advanced to the finals after 0–0 draw in Rome.

Janashia was loaned back to Locomotive Tbilisi in April 2002.

Janashia had a brief spell in the Süper Lig with Kocaelispor.

== International career ==
Janashia made his Georgia debut on 7 June 1997 against Moldova, a 1998 World Cup qualifier. He also played five times in friendlies, three times in UEFA Euro 2000 qualifying, and played his last match in 2002 World Cup qualification match, against Romania on 28 March 2001.

== Personal life ==
He is the brother of Zamir Janashia.

== Career statistics ==
#	Date	Venue	Opponent	Score	Result	Competition
1.	30 May 1998	Boris Paichadze Stadium, Tbilisi, Georgia	Russia	1–1	Draw	Friendly
2.	27 March 1999	Boris Paichadze Stadium, Tbilisi, Georgia	Slovenia	1–1	Draw	UEFA Euro 2000 qualifying
3.	28 April 1999	Boris Paichadze Stadium, Tbilisi, Georgia	Norway	1–4	Lose	UEFA Euro 2000 qualifying
4.	6 February 2000	Limassol, Cyprus	Armenia	2–1	Win	Friendly

== Honours ==
Lokomotiv Moscow

- Russian Cup: 1995–96, 1996–97, 1999–2000, 2000–01

Individual

- Top 33 players of the Russian Top Division: 1998, 1999
