= Hans Fróði Hansen =

Faroese footballer

Hans Fróði á Toftanesi
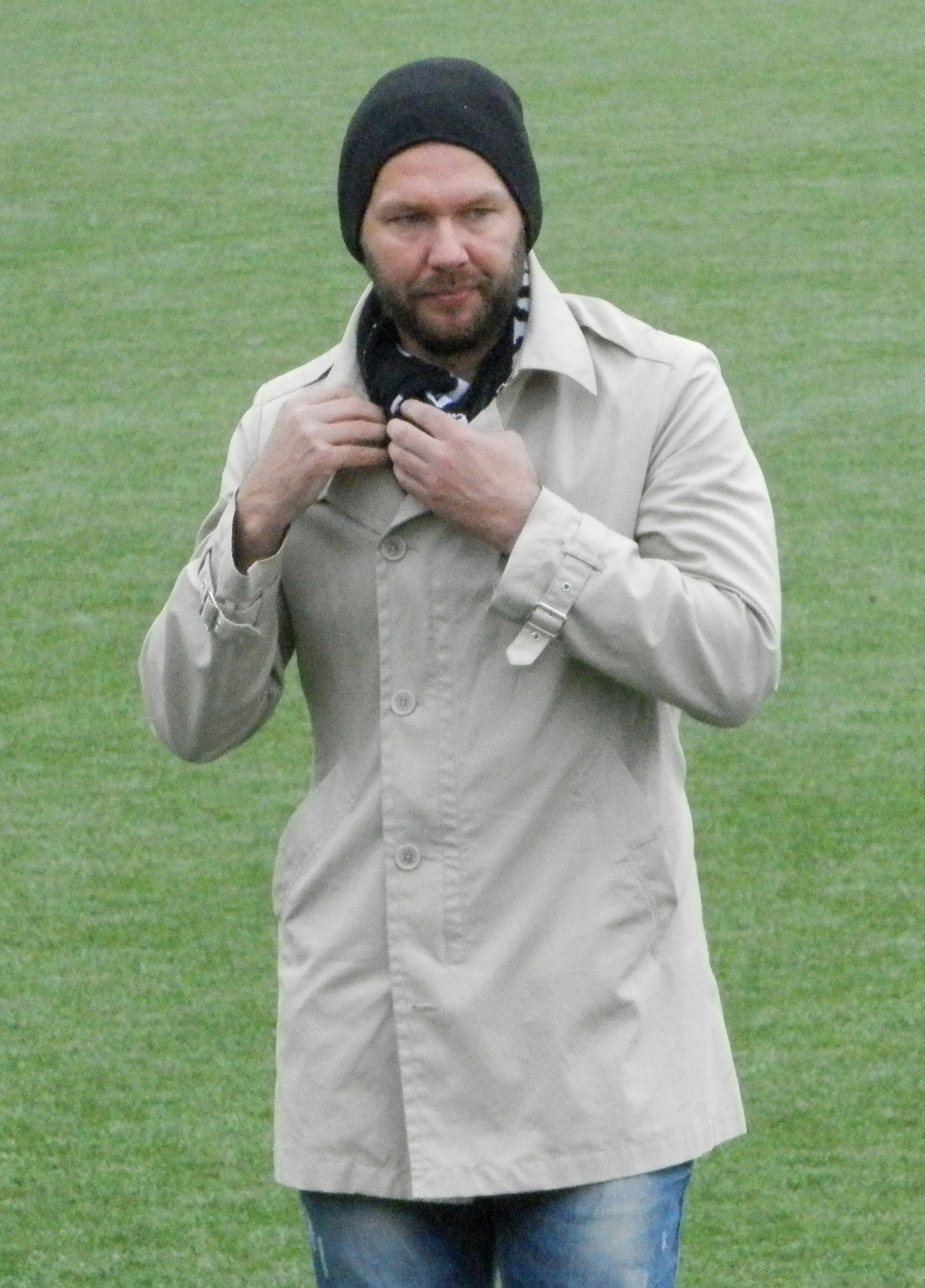
- Hans Fróði in 2013

Personal information
- Full name: Hans Fróði á Toftanesi
- Birth name: Hans Fróði Hansen
- Date of birth: 25 August 1975 (age 51)
- Place of birth: Leirvík, Faroe Islands
- Height: 1.91 m (6 ft 3 in)
- Position: Centre-back

Senior career*
Years	Team	Apps	(Gls)
1991–1995	LÍF	57	(6)
1996	B68	22	(1)
1997	LÍF	16	(4)
1997–1999	HB	66	(7)
2000–2001	Sogndal	14	(1)
2001–2003	B68	76	(5)
2004	Fram Reykjavík	12	(0)
2004–2006	Breiðablik	15	(1)
2006	LÍF	21	(4)
2008	Víkingur	2	(0)
2012–2013	TB	4	(0)

International career
1996–2004	Faroe Islands	26	(1)

Managerial career
- 2006: LÍF Leirvík
- 2012: TB Tvøroyri(assistant)
- 2013: TB Tvøroyri
- * Club domestic league appearances and goals

Hans Fróði á Toftanesi (born Hans Fróði Hansen; 25 August 1975) is a retired footballer who played as a centre-back. He made 26 appearances for the Faroe Islands national team. In 2018 he was sentenced to three years and nine months in prison for having instigated woman to commit 41 sexual assaults against her four-year-old son.

== Club career ==
Hans Fróði played in Norway, Iceland and for several Faroese clubs. He played for Fram Reykjavík in 2004, appearing in twelve games in the 2004 Úrvalsdeild. In November 2004 he joined 1. deild karla club Breiðablik where he appeared in fifteen matches, scoring one goal.

== International career ==
Hans Fróði was capped 26 times for the Faroe Islands national team. On 5 June 1999, in a qualification match for Euro 2000 in Toftir, he scored his only goal for his country, a last minute equaliser against Scotland (1–1).

He made his international debut in a 1–0 away defeat to Bosnia in Sarajevo on 19 August 1998 and played his last game for the Faroes in a 3–1 home defeat against Lithuania on 10 September 2003 in Toftir.

== Managerial career ==
In 2006, Hans Fróði was manager for LÍF Leirvík.

After some of his international business projects failed, he decided to resume his career in Faroese football. In 2013, he took over as manager of the top division side TB Tvøroyri. He was TB Tvøroyri's manager until 23 July 2013.

== Personal life ==
Hans Fróði started a second career as fashion and beauty advisor under the name Hans F. Hansen of Scandinavia. His main product line was called Below Your Belt, a series of products intended for pubic hair removal.

=== Legal history ===
On 28 May 2018, Hans Fróði was sentenced to three years and nine months imprisonment, when found guilty in having instigated a 43-year-old woman to commit 41 sexual assaults against her four-year-old son.
