= Maksim Smirnov =

Estonian footballer

Personal information
- Full name: Maksim Smirnov
- Date of birth: 28 December 1979 (age 46)
- Place of birth: Tallinn, then part of Estonian SSR, Soviet Union
- Height: 1.80 m (5 ft 11 in)
- Position: Winger

Senior career*
Years	Team	Apps	(Gls)
1995–1997	FC TVMK Tallinn	28	(1)
1997–1999	FC Flora Tallinn	26	(3)
2000	JK Viljandi Tulevik	3	(0)
2001	FC Valga	9	(0)
2002–2005	FC TVMK Tallinn	106	(28)
2006–2007	FC Levadia Tallinn	47	(9)
2008	FK Ventspils	1	(0)
2008–?	JK Nõmme Kalju	47	(11)
2010	→ FC Narva Trans (loan)	14	(2)
2010–2011	Tallinna FC Atletik/FC Infonet	16	(2)
2011	SK Kiviõli Tamme Auto	0	(0)
Total		297	(56)

International career^{‡}
	Estonia U-17	8	(0)
	Estonia U-19	12	(1)
	Estonia U-21	4	(0)
1997–2006	Estonia	39	(2)
- * Club domestic league appearances and goals as of 30 November 2009 ‡ National team caps and goals as of 11 October 2007

Maksim Smirnov (born 28 December 1979) is a retired Estonian professional footballer. He played the position of midfielder.

He was born in Estonia.

== Club career ==
On 7 March 2010, he joined FC Narva Trans on loan for the first half of the season.

== International career ==
He is also the former member of the Estonia national football team with 39 caps and 2 goal to his name.

== Honours ==
=== Club ===
- JK Nõmme Kalju
  - Estonian Cup
    - Runners Up: 2008–09
