= Milenko Ačimovič =

Slovenian footballer (born 1977)

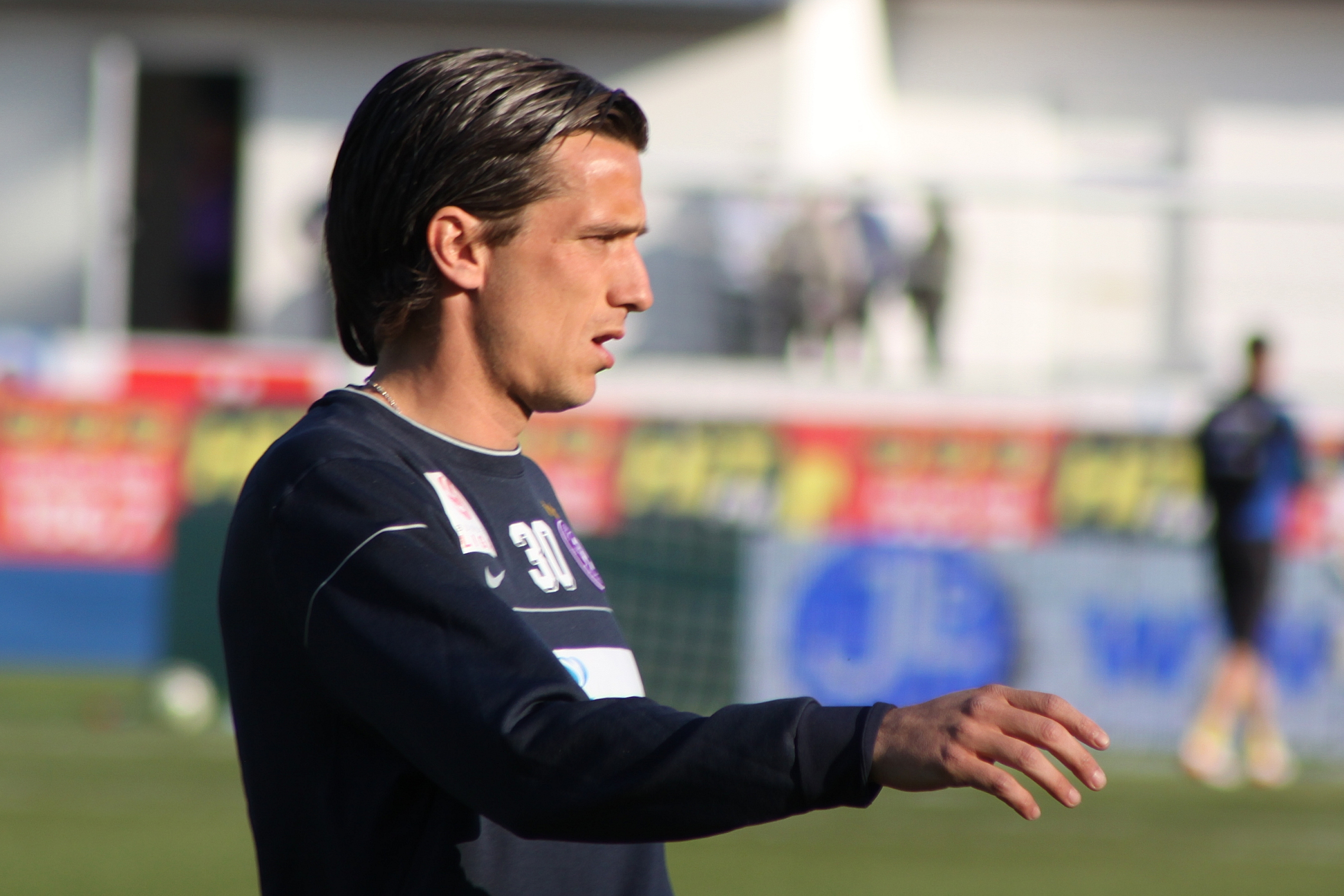
- Ačimovič playing for Austria Wien in 2009

Personal information
- Date of birth: 15 February 1977 (age 49)
- Place of birth: Ljubljana, SFR Yugoslavia
- Height: 1.87 m (6 ft 2 in)
- Positions: Attacking midfielder; winger

Youth career
- Olimpija

Senior career*
Years	Team	Apps	(Gls)
1994–1996	Železničar Ljubljana		
1996–1998	Olimpija	36	(7)
1998–2002	Red Star Belgrade	102	(34)
2002–2004	Tottenham Hotspur	17	(0)
2004	→ Lille (loan)	16	(6)
2004–2006	Lille	31	(6)
2006–2007	Al-Ittihad		(3)
2007–2010	Austria Wien	101	(30)

International career
1997	Slovenia U20	1	(1)
1995–1997	Slovenia U21	9	(0)
1998–2007	Slovenia	74	(13)
2003	Slovenia B	2	(0)

Managerial career
- 2020–2025: Slovenia U21
- * Club domestic league appearances and goals

Milenko "Mile" Ačimovič (pronounced [miˈleːŋkɔ aˈtʃiːmɔʋitʃ]; Serbian: Aćimović [atɕǐːmoʋitɕ]; born 15 February 1977) is a Slovenian former professional footballer who played as a midfielder. Besides Slovenia, he has played in FR Yugoslavia, England, France, Saudi Arabia, and Austria.

== Club career ==
Ačimovič started his career with the youth ranks of his hometown club Železničar Ljubljana. He made four first division appearances for Železničar when he was 18 years old. From 1996 until 1998 he scored seven league goals in 36 matches for Olimpija. He then joined Red Star Belgrade, where he played for four and a half years. After successful appearances for the Slovenian national team in Euro 2000 and World Cup 2002, several bigger European clubs expressed interest in him. In the summer of 2002, he joined Tottenham Hotspur. In his first season in London, he made a few appearances, but never established himself as a first team player. In his second season, he became a fringe player.

In January 2004, he joined French club Lille on loan until the end of the season. When he arrived, the club was in 14th place in the Ligue 1, but Ačimovič contributed to an eventual second-place finish, enough to qualify for the Champions League. Also, in his first year at Lille, he was part of the team's UEFA Cup campaign, when Lille reached the last sixteen before being eliminated. The following year, he played in the third qualifying round of the Champions League, when Lille reached the group stages. Ačimovič scored Lille's only goal of the campaign against Manchester United in Lille's 1–0 victory in Paris.

After two-and-a-half seasons at Lille, he fell out of favour and joined Al-Ittihad for the 2006–07 season. After failing to adapt to life in Saudi Arabia, he agreed on a mutual termination of the contract, subsequently moving back to Europe to join Austria Wien. In September 2010, Ačimovič ended his football career following a persistent right knee injury.

== International career ==
Ačimovič debuted for the Slovenia national team on 22 April 1998 in Murska Sobota against the Czech Republic. In the first leg of the UEFA Euro 2000 qualifiers against Ukraine, he scored the winning goal from near the halfway line, helping Slovenia qualify for its first major tournament. At the 2002 FIFA World Cup, Ačimovič scored in Slovenia's 3–1 defeat to Paraguay in Seogwipo. His final appearance for the national side came on 28 March 2007 in Celje, during a 1–0 home defeat to the Netherlands in a Euro 2008 qualification match. He announced his retirement from international football that August. He earned a total of 74 caps for Slovenia, scoring 13 goals.

== Personal life ==
Ačimovič and his wife Lea have two children, a daughter Klara (born 2002) and a son Mateo (2007), who is also a professional footballer. He is also the former brother-in-law of Serbian footballer Dejan Stanković, who was married to his sister Ana until 2024.

== Honours ==
Lille

- UEFA Intertoto Cup: 2004
