= Sébastien Fournier =

Swiss footballer and manager (born 1971)

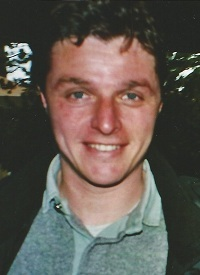

Personal information
- Date of birth: 27 June 1971 (age 55)
- Place of birth: Veysonnaz, Switzerland
- Height: 1.80 m (5 ft 11 in)
- Position: Midfielder

Senior career*
Years	Team	Apps	(Gls)
1987–1996	FC Sion	190	(10)
1996–1997	VfB Stuttgart	11	(0)
1997–2003	Servette	120	(4)
Total		321	(14)

International career
1994–2002	Switzerland	40	(3)

Managerial career
- 2006–2009: Servette (staff)
- 2009–XXXX: Servette II
- 2010–2012: Servette (head of youth)
- 2012: FC Sion
- 2012–2013: Servette
- 2014–2017: FC Sion (technical director)
- 2014: FC Sion (U18)
- 2015: FC Sion II (caretaker)
- 2016: FC Sion II (caretaker)
- 2017: FC Sion
- * Club domestic league appearances and goals

Sébastien Fournier (born 27 June 1971) is a Swiss football manager, most recently for FC Sion, and former football player.

== Club career ==
Fournier played for FC Sion, VfB Stuttgart and Servette Geneva, where he spent most of his career.

He played for Switzerland national football team and was a participant at the 1994 FIFA World Cup and at the UEFA Euro 1996.

== Managerial career ==
=== Servette ===
Fournier worked as a chief executive at Servette from 2006 to 2009. After this role, he was appointed as the new manager of the club's U21 squad. He got a double role in 2010, where he also was appointed as the headleader of the club's youth academy.

=== FC Sion ===
In June 2012, one week after his graduation from the UEFA Pro Licence, it was announced that Fournier would join FC Sion as manager in summer 2012. This marks the return to his childhood club and is linked with high expectations, even though it is his first station as a professional manager. He won the selection over Michel Decastel, because the club owner Christian Constantin wanted to have a young coach, after he was impressed with the achievements by Roberto Di Matteo, Pep Guardiola, André Villas-Boas and Murat Yakin. He was sacked as manager of Sion on 4 September 2012 due to a bad relationship between him and the squad.

=== Servette ===
On 13 September 2012, Fournier was appointed as the new manager of Servette. He got sacked after 11 months in the club on 20 August 2013.

=== FC Sion ===
In March 2014, Fournier got the role as technical director of the club. Later in 2014, Fournier was hired as U18 manager. So he had a double role. He was also appointed as caretaker for the U21 reserve team from September 2015 to the new year. And once again in April 2016.

On 25 April 2017, he was appointed as head coach of FC Sion after Peter Zeidler got sacked.

== Honours ==
=== Player ===
FC Sion

- Swiss Championship: 1991–92
- Swiss Cup: 1994–95, 1995–96

Servette

- Swiss Championship: 1998–99
- Swiss Cup: 2000–01
