= Sergei Hohlov-Simson =

Estonian footballer

Personal information
- Full name: Sergei Hohlov-Simson
- Date of birth: 22 April 1972 (age 54)
- Place of birth: Pärnu, then part of Estonian SSR, Soviet Union
- Height: 1.81 m (5 ft 11 1/2 in)
- Position: Central defender

Senior career*
| Years | Team | Apps | (Gls) |
| 1992–94 | FC Flora Tallinn | | |
| 1995/96 | JK Tervis Pärnu | | |
| 1996/97 | Lelle SK | | |
| 1997–99 | FC Flora Tallinn | 49 | (6) |
| 2000 | JK Viljandi Tulevik | 7 | (0) |
| 2000 | FC Kuressaare | 1 | (0) |
| 2000/01 | Hapoel Kfar Saba FC | 5 | (1) |
| 2000/01 | Hapoel Tayibe F.C. | 20 | (0) |
| 2001 | HamKam | 2 | (0) |
| 2002–03 | FC Levadia Maardu | 39 | (0) |
| 2004–05 | FC Levadia Tallinn | 51 | (1) |

International career
| 1992–2004 | Estonia | 58 | (2) |

Managerial career
- 2011-22: FC Levadia Tallinn
- * Club domestic league appearances and goals

Sergei Hohlov-Simson (born 22 April 1972 in Pärnu) is a retired football central defender from Estonia. He last played for FC Levadia Tallinn, where he retired in 2005. He also played as a professional in Israel and Norway.

== International career ==
Hohlov-Simson obtained a total number of 58 caps for the national team during his career, scoring two goals.
