= Meho Kodro =

Bosnian footballer and manager (born 1967)

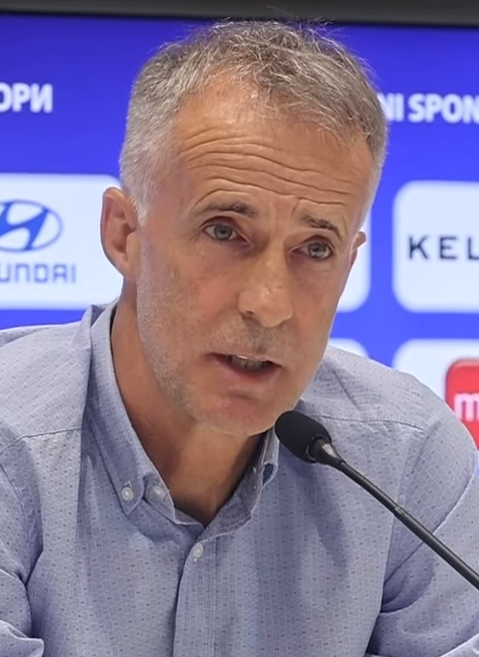
- Kodro as Bosnia and Herzegovina manager in 2023

Personal information
- Full name: Mehmed Kodro
- Date of birth: 12 January 1967 (age 59)
- Place of birth: Mostar, SR Bosnia and Herzegovina, Yugoslavia
- Height: 1.88 m (6 ft 2 in)
- Position: Forward

Youth career
- 1980–1985: Velež Mostar

Senior career*
Years	Team	Apps	(Gls)
1985–1991	Velež Mostar	122	(45)
1991–1995	Real Sociedad	129	(73)
1995–1996	Barcelona	32	(9)
1996–2000	Tenerife	72	(18)
1999–2000	→ Alavés (loan)	30	(5)
2000–2001	Maccabi Tel Aviv	6	(1)
Total		391	(151)

International career
1991–1992	Yugoslavia	2	(0)
1996–2000	Bosnia and Herzegovina	13	(3)

Managerial career
- 2008: Bosnia and Herzegovina
- 2008–2010: Real Sociedad (youth)
- 2010–2013: Real Sociedad B
- 2014–2015: Sarajevo
- 2016–2018: Servette
- 2020–2022: Stade Lausanne Ouchy
- 2023: Bosnia and Herzegovina
- * Club domestic league appearances and goals

Mehmed "Meho" Kodro (born 12 January 1967) is a Bosnian professional football manager and former player who played as a forward. He is currently serving as board counselor to Bosnian Premier League club Velež Mostar.

Kodro started playing professionally at Velež Mostar, making his first team debut in 1985. He spent most of his 16-year senior career in Spain, playing for Real Sociedad, Barcelona, Tenerife and Alavés, amassing La Liga totals of 263 matches and 105 goals. Kodro finished his career at Israeli club Maccabi Tel Aviv in 2001. He possessed good technical skills, and was equally adept in the air.

After retiring, Kodro started a managerial career. He had a short stint as manager of the Bosnia and Herzegovina national team in 2008. He then worked as a youth coach at Real Sociedad, before managing Real Sociedad B. Kodro managed Bosnian Premier League side Sarajevo, and later also managed Swiss clubs Servette and Stade Lausanne Ouchy. In August 2023, he again took over as manager of Bosnia and Herzegovina, but was sacked by the end of September.

== Club career ==
Born in Mostar, SR Bosnia and Herzegovina, SFR Yugoslavia, Kodro's professional debut occurred in 1985 at the age of 18 with hometown club Velež. He appeared in only 14 Yugoslav First League games in his first two years but eventually became a starter, scoring a total of 31 goals in his last two full seasons and helping his team win the 1986 edition of the Yugoslav Cup – he did not play in the final against Dinamo Zagreb however – and three consecutive top-three finishes.

When the Yugoslav Wars began, Kodro migrated to Spain – after scoring five goals in only five matches in the last edition of the Yugoslavian championship – where he spent the vast majority of his remaining career. He first played with Real Sociedad of San Sebastián, always netting in double digits for the Basques, including 23 in the 1993–94 season and a career-best 25 in the following year (including a hat-trick in the Basque derby) and finishing second in the Pichichi Trophy race to Real Madrid's Iván Zamorano.

Kodro was purchased by Barcelona in the 1995 off-season, starting throughout most of the campaign but only managing nine La Liga goals for the Catalans, including two in the El Clásico against Real Madrid (3–0 home win). After Barça came out empty in silverware, manager Johan Cruyff – who insisted on his signing – was dismissed and the player also left Camp Nou, signing with Tenerife where he played three seasons, notably contributing two goals from eight appearances in the side's semi-final run in the UEFA Cup. In the 1998–99 season, for the only time in his career, he failed to find the net and his team suffered top-flight relegation.

Kodro returned to the Basque region in the summer of 1999, joining Alavés on loan for the 1999–2000 campaign. He retired from football the following year after one year in Israel with Maccabi Tel Aviv.

== International career ==
Kodro earned two caps for Yugoslavia, his debut coming on 4 September 1991 in a 4–3 friendly loss against Sweden. In the late 1990s and early 2000s, he played 13 times with Bosnia and Herzegovina, appearing in six 1998 FIFA World Cup qualification games and scoring in a 2–1 away victory over Slovenia.

== Managerial career ==
Kodro started working as a manager in 2006, being assistant to José Mari Bakero at former club Real Sociedad. On 5 January 2008, he was appointed head coach of Bosnia and Herzegovina, accepting the job after the Football Association met his conditions, which were to allow him to continue living in San Sebastián and to guarantee him full independence in football matters. However, things quickly went sour; Kodro led the side in two friendlies before refusing to take charge of the team for a game against Iran scheduled for 26 May in Tehran, arranged by the Association without his knowledge; as a result, he was sacked on 17 May.

In the summer of 2008, Kodro was appointed manager of the Real Sociedad Cantera youth sides. He remained in the post for two years when he was promoted to B-team duties, as they competed in Segunda División B.

In the following years, Kodro was in charge of Sarajevo in the Bosnian Premier League and Swiss Super League club Servette. On 4 June 2020, he signed as the new manager of Stade Lausanne Ouchy in the latter country's Challenge League.

In August 2023, Kodro returned to managing the Bosnia and Herzegovina national team. He was victorious in his first game back as the team beat Liechtenstein in a UEFA Euro 2024 qualifying match on 8 September 2023. Following a defeat to Iceland three days later however, greatly limiting Bosnia and Herzegovina's chances to qualify directly for UEFA Euro 2024, Kodro was sacked as manager on 21 September.

== Executive career ==
In June 2025, Kodro was appointed counselor to the Administrative Board of Velež Mostar.

== Personal life ==
Kodro's son, Kenan, is also a professional footballer and a forward. He was coached by his father at Real Sociedad B for two years. They became the first son and father to represent Bosnia and Herzegovina internationally.

== Career statistics ==
=== International goals ===
Scores and results list Bosnia and Herzegovina's goal tally first, score column indicates score after each Kodro goal.

List of international goals scored by Meho Kodro
No.	Date	Venue	Opponent	Score	Result	Competition
1	10 November 1996	Bežigrad, Ljubljana, Slovenia	Slovenia	2–0	2–1	1998 World Cup qualification
2	10 March 1999	Üllői úti, Budapest, Hungary	Hungary	1–0	1–1	Friendly
3	5 June 1999	Koševo, Sarajevo, Bosnia and Herzegovina	Lithuania	1–0	2–0	Euro 2000 qualifying

== Managerial statistics ==
As of match played 11 September 2023

Managerial record by team and tenure
Team	From	To	Record				
Team	From	To	G	W	D	L	Win %
Bosnia and Herzegovina	5 January 2008	17 May 2008	2	0	1	1	0.00
Real Sociedad B	1 July 2010	30 June 2013	114	36	37	41	31.58
Sarajevo	26 September 2014	21 April 2015	17	11	4	2	64.71
Servette	30 December 2016	8 March 2018	42	24	11	7	57.14
Stade Lausanne Ouchy	4 June 2020	30 June 2022	76	29	21	26	38.16
Bosnia and Herzegovina	3 August 2023	21 September 2023	2	1	0	1	50.00
Total			253	101	74	78	39.92

== Honours ==
=== Player ===
Velež Mostar

- Yugoslav Cup: 1985–86

Maccabi Tel Aviv

- Israel State Cup: 2000–01

Individual

- Bosnian Footballer of the Year: 1996, 1997
