= 2022 A Lyga =

Lyga football

A Lyga
- Season: 2022
- Dates: 4 March – 23 November 2022
- Champions: Žalgiris
- Relegated: Jonava
- Champions League: Žalgiris
- Europa Conference League: Kauno Žalgiris; Panevėzys; Hegelmann
- Matches: 180
- Goals: 386 (2.14 per match)
- Top goalscorer: Renan Oliveira (13 goals)
- Biggest home win: Žalgiris 6–0 Jonava (4 March 2022); Hegelmann 6–0 Jonava (16 July 2022)
- Biggest away win: Jonava 0–5 Žalgiris (27 April 2022); Jonava 0–5 Panevėžys (22 June 2022); Sūduva 0–5 Žalgiris (26 June 2022); Jonava 0–5 Banga (7 September 2022)
- Highest scoring: Džiugas 3–5 Žalgiris (13 April 2022)
- Longest winning run: 8 matches Žalgiris (19 June - 28 August 2022)
- Longest unbeaten run: 13 matches Žalgiris (4 March - 14 May)
- Longest winless run: 28 matches Jonava (4 March - 12 September 2022)
- Longest losing run: 12 matches Jonava (4 March - 3 May 2022)
- Highest attendance: 1237; Sūduva 4–1 Panevėžys (7 August 2022)
- Lowest attendance: 45; Kauno Žalgiris 5–1 Džiugas (7 September 2022)
- Total attendance: 66,834
- Average attendance: 371
- All statistics correct as of 12 September 2022.

The 2022 A Lyga, for sponsorship reasons also called Optibet A lyga was the 33rd season of the A Lyga, the top-tier football league of Lithuania. The season began on 4 March and concluded on 23 November 2022.

== Teams ==
FK Žalgiris started the season as defending champions. DFK Dainava and FK Nevėžis were relegated, and replaced with FA Šiauliai and FK Jonava. All teams that were eligible to participate in A lyga based on sporting principle have successfully passed the licensing process for the first time in recent years.

Home towns of the 2022 A Lyga teams

2022 A Lyga competitors
Club	Location	Stadium	Surface	Capacity	Seasons in A Lyga	2021 position
FK Banga	Gargždai	Gargždai Stadium	Artificial	2,323	9	7th
FK Banga	Gargždai	—	—	—	9	7th
FC Džiugas	Telšiai	Telšiai Central Stadium	Natural	2,400	2	8th
FC Džiugas	Telšiai	Ateitis Progymnasium Stadium	—	—	2	8th
FC Hegelmann	Kaunas	LFF Kaunas training center stadium	Artificial	500	2	5th
FC Hegelmann	Kaunas	—	—	—	2	5th
FK Jonava	Jonava	Central Stadium of Jonava	Natural	2,000	3	2nd in I lyga
FK Jonava	Jonava	Artificial Stadium of Jonava	Artificial	500	3	2nd in I lyga
FK Kauno Žalgiris	Kaunas	Kauno Žalgiris FA Stadium	Natural	500	8	3rd
FK Kauno Žalgiris	Kaunas	NFA Stadium	Artificial	500	8	3rd
FK Panevėžys	Panevėžys	Aukštaitija Stadium	Natural	6,600	4	4th
FK Panevėžys	Panevėžys	Žemyna Progymnasium Stadium	Artificial	500	4	4th
FK Riteriai	Vilnius	LFF Stadium	Artificial	5,067	9	6th
FK Riteriai	Vilnius	Sportima Arena	Artificial	3,157	9	6th
FK Sūduva	Marijampolė	Sūduva Stadium (Hikvision Arena)	Natural	6,250	20	2nd
FK Sūduva	Marijampolė	Marijampolė Football Indoor Arena (Hikvision FIA)	Artificial	2,660	20	2nd
FA Šiauliai	Šiauliai	Savivaldybė Stadium	Natural	4,000	1	1st in I lyga
FA Šiauliai	Šiauliai	Gytariai Stadium	Artificial	500	1	1st in I lyga
FK Žalgiris	Vilnius	LFF Stadium	Artificial	5,067	21	1st
FK Žalgiris	Vilnius	Sportima Arena	Artificial	3,157	21	1st

=== Managers ===
==== Current Managers ====
Team	Coach	Appointed	In Charge	Licence
FK Banga	(Portugal) David Afonso	3 June 2021	4 years, 6 months	UEFA Pro
FC Džiugas	(Portugal) João Prates	15 June 2021	3 years, 6 months	UEFA Pro
FC Hegelmann	(Lithuania) Andrius Skerla	2 January 2021	4 years, 11 months	UEFA Pro
FK Jonava	(Ukraine) Petro Kushlyk	26 May 2022	3 years, 7 months	UEFA Pro
FK Kauno Žalgiris	(Lithuania) Rokas Garastas	3 December 2019	6 years	UEFA Pro
FK Panevėžys	(Italy) Gino Lettieri	22 September 2022	3 years, 3 months	UEFA Pro
FK Riteriai	(Spain) Pablo Villar	24 May 2022	3 years, 7 months	UEFA Pro
FK Sūduva	(Portugal) Matthew Silva (caretaker)	20 October 2022	3 years, 2 months	UEFA Pro
FA Šiauliai	(Lithuania) Mindaugas Čepas	1 December 2020	5 years	UEFA Pro
FK Žalgiris	(Kazakhstan) Vladimir Cheburin	11 January 2021	4 years, 11 months	UEFA Pro

==== Managerial changes ====
Team	Outgoing manager	Manner of departure	Date of vacancy	Incoming manager	Date of appointment
FK Panevėžys	(Portugal) João Luís Martins	returned to C.S. Marítimo	30 November 2021	(Lithuania) Valdas Urbonas	11 December 2021
FK Riteriai	(Portugal) Miguel Moreira	end of contract	30 November 2021	(Sweden) Glenn Ståhl	27 January 2022
FK Sūduva	(Spain) Víctor Basadre	contract terminated	4 April 2022	(Portugal) Miguel Moreira	11 April 2022
FK Jonava	(Lithuania) Eisvinas Utyra	resigned	23 April 2022	(Ukraine) Yevhen Lutsenko (caretaker)	23 April 2022
FK Riteriai	(Sweden) Glenn Ståhl	resigned	7 May 2022	(Lithuania) Vaidas Sabaliauskas (caretaker)	12 May 2022
FK Jonava	(Ukraine) Yevhen Lutsenko (caretaker)	resigned	11 May 2022	(Lithuania) Martynas Matuzas (Note: Team's goalkeeper and U-19 youth coach, also playing as goalkeeper and the captain for the first team) (caretaker)	14 May 2022
FK Riteriai	(Lithuania) Vaidas Sabaliauskas (caretaker)	appointment of permanent manager	24 May 2022	(Spain) Pablo Villar	24 May 2022
FK Jonava	(Lithuania) Martynas Matuzas (caretaker)	appointment of permanent manager	26 May 2022	(Ukraine) Petro Kushlyk	26 May 2022
FC Džiugas	(Lithuania) Marius Šluta	sacked	13 June 2022	(Portugal) João Prates	15 June 2022
FK Panevėžys	(Lithuania) Valdas Urbonas	sacked	10 September 2022	(Lithuania) Dainius Gleveckas (caretaker)	10 September 2022
FK Panevėžys	(Lithuania) Dainius Gleveckas (caretaker)	appointment of permanent manager	22 September 2022	(Italy) Gino Lettieri	22 September 2022
FK Sūduva	(Portugal) Miguel Moreira	mutual consent	20 October 2022	(Portugal) Matthew Silva (caretaker)	20 October 2022
FK Sūduva	(Portugal) Matthew Silva	end of caretaker spell	30 November 2022	-	-

== Regular season ==
=== League table ===
Pos	Team	Pld	W	D	L	GF	GA	GD	Pts	Qualification or relegation
1	Žalgiris (C)	36	26	6	4	85	27	+58	84	Qualification for the Champions League first qualifying round
2	Kauno Žalgiris	36	18	9	9	55	37	+18	63	Qualification for the Europa Conference League second qualifying round
3	Panevėžys	36	18	8	10	50	31	+19	62	Qualification for the Europa Conference League first qualifying round
4	Hegelmann	36	16	13	7	62	32	+30	61	Qualification for the Europa Conference League first qualifying round
5	Riteriai	36	17	8	11	53	41	+12	59	
6	Sūduva	36	15	10	11	48	40	+8	55	
7	Šiauliai	36	13	11	12	39	39	0	50	
8	Banga	36	6	12	18	33	54	−21	30	
9	Džiugas (O)	36	5	12	19	34	67	−33	27	Qualification for A Lyga play-off
10	Jonava (R)	36	0	3	33	12	103	−91	3	Relegation to I Lyga

Source: A Lyga
Rules for classification: 1) Points; 2) Play-off (for champion only) 3) Head-to-head points; 4) Head-to-head goal difference; 5) Head-to-head goals scored; 6) Head-to-head matches won; 7) Goal difference; 8) Goals scored; 9) Matches won; 10) Fairplay ranking; 11) Draw.
(C) Champions; (O) Play-off winners; (R) Relegated

=== Fixtures and results ===
==== Rounds 1–18 ====
Home \ Away	BAN	DZI	HEG	JON	KAU	PAN	RIT	SIA	SUD	ZAL
Banga	—	3–3	1–0	1–1	3–1	1–2	0–4	0–0	0–1	0–2
Džiugas	0–0	—	1–1	2–0	1–2	0–1	0–1	0–0	2–2	3–5
Hegelmann Litauen	2–0	2–0	—	4–0	2–1	0–1	1–1	1–0	2–2	2–2
Jonava	1–3	0–1	1–4	—	0–2	0–5	0–1	0–3	0–4	0–5
Kauno Žalgiris	1–1	2–1	1–3	4–0	—	2–1	0–1	0–0	0–3	2–2
Panevėžys	2–0	1–0	1–1	4–0	1–0	—	3–0	1–2	2–1	0–2
Riteriai	1–0	3–0	0–3	5–0	1–1	0–0	—	1–1	2–0	0–1
Šiauliai	1–1	3–2	0–0	3–0	0–1	0–3	1–0	—	0–0	0–1
Sūduva	3–0	1–1	0–1	2–0	1–1	2–1	1–1	2–0	—	0–5
Žalgiris	2–1	2–1	2–1	6–0	1–2	0–0	2–0	0–0	0–0	—

Source: A Lyga
Legend: Blue = home team win; Yellow = draw; Red = away team win.

==== Rounds 19–36 ====
Home \ Away	BAN	DZI	HEG	JON	KAU	PAN	RIT	SIA	SUD	ZAL
Banga	—	1–1	1–1	2–0	0–1	1–1	0–1	2–3	0–0	0–2
Džiugas	0–1	—	0–1	2–2	0–3	0–0	1–4	1–0	2–1	1–1
Hegelmann Litauen	5–0	5–0	—	6–0	1–1	1–1	2–2	2–1	2–0	1–4
Jonava	0–5	0–1	0–1	—	1–2	1–1	0–3	1–3	0–2	0–4
Kauno Žalgiris	3–0	5–1	1–1	2–1	—	0–0	2–0	1–0	2–2	0–2
Panevėžys	2–1	3–2	3–1	2–1	2–1	—	0–1	1–2	2–0	0–1
Riteriai	2–2	2–1	0–0	2–1	2–0	2–1	—	3–1	2–3	1–5
Šiauliai	1–1	2–2	0–0	2–0	0–3	1–0	3–2	—	2–0	3–0
Sūduva	2–0	1–1	2–1	1–0	0–2	4–1	2–1	2–1	—	1–2
Žalgiris	2–1	6–0	2–1	3–1	2–3	0–1	3–1	5–0	1–0	—

Source: A Lyga
Legend: Blue = home team win; Yellow = draw; Red = away team win.

=== A Lyga play-off ===
The 9th-placed team, Džiugas, played a play-off against the second-placed team from I Lyga, FK Neptūnas, for the remaining spot in the league.

=== First leg ===
27 November 2022	Neptūnas	0–4	Džiugas	Klaipėda, Lithuania
13:00 EET (UTC+2)		Report	Jorge Eduardo 29', 73', 77'; Ankudinovas 67'	Stadium: Klaipėdos dirbtinės dangos stadionas Attendance: 400; Referee: Donatas Rumšas

=== Second leg ===
30 November 2022	Džiugas	1–0 (5–0 agg.)	Neptūnas	Telšiai, Lithuania
13:00 EET (UTC+2)	Virkšas 69'	Report		Stadium: Telšiai Central Stadium; Attendance: 60; Referee: Manfredas Lukjančukas

== Top scorers ==
Goals	Assists	Player	Club
17	2	(Brazil) Renan Oliveira	FK Žalgiris
13	6	(Lithuania) Vilius Armanavičius	FC Hegelmann
13	3	(Ukraine) Oleksiy Shchebetun	FA Šiauliai
11	1	(Democratic Republic of the Congo) Kule Mbombo	FK Sūduva
10	3	(Lithuania) Rokas Filipavičius	FK Riteriai
9	2	(Lithuania) Daniel Romanovskij	FA Šiauliai
9	2	(Netherlands) Anton Fase	FK Kauno Žalgiris
9	2	(Nigeria) Mathias Oyewusi	FK Žalgiris
9	0	(Lithuania) Robertas Vėževičius	FK Banga

== See also ==
- Football in Lithuania
- 2022 Lithuanian Football Cup
