= 2020 A Lyga =

A Lyga
- Season: 2020
- Dates: 6 March – 7 November 2020
- Champions: Žalgiris
- Champions League: Žalgiris
- Europa Conference League: Sūduva; Kauno Žalgiris; Panevėžys
- Matches: 60
- Goals: 153 (2.55 per match)
- Top goalscorer: Hugo Vidémont (13 goals)
- Biggest home win: Žalgiris 4–0 Panevėžys (6 March 2020)
- Biggest away win: Riteriai 0–3 Kauno Žalgiris (8 March 2020)
- Highest scoring: Žalgiris 4–0 Panevėžys (6 March 2020)
- Longest winning run: 3 matches Sūduva
- Longest unbeaten run: 3 matches Sūduva
- Longest winless run: 4 matches Panevėžys
- Longest losing run: 4 matches Panevėžys
- All statistics correct as of 13 June 2020.

The 2020 A Lyga was the 31st season of the A Lyga, the top-tier football league of Lithuania. The season began on 6 March and was planned to end on 7 November 2020. On 12 March all sports events were postponed for two weeks in the light of the COVID-19 pandemic.

== Teams ==
FK Sūduva Marijampolė begin the season as defending champions having won their third consecutive league title last year.

Three clubs dropped out of A Lyga last season - Stumbras folded in the summer, while Atlantas and Palanga were disqualified after the end of the season after investigation revealed numerous match-fixing incidents.

=== Licensing process ===
The top 5 previous season's teams - FK Sūduva Marijampolė, FK Žalgiris, FK Riteriai, FK Kauno Žalgiris and FK Panevėžys met licensing criteria and received a straight pass to their licenses. Disqualified FK Palanga and FK Atlantas appealed the disqualification decision and expressed interest in playing in A Lyga. Their appeals were rejected.

Five of the I Lyga teams applied for A Lyga licenses - FK Banga Gargždai, FC Džiugas, Vilniaus Vytis, DFK Dainava and FC Hegelmann Litauen. The previous year's I Lyga winners FC Džiugas failed to meet A Lyga licensing criteria, and their application was rejected. FC Džiugas will continue playing in I Lyga this season. FK Banga Gargždai won the play-off match against FK Palanga and earned the right to play in A Lyga. Their A Lyga license was granted upon appeal. Vilniaus Vytis and DFK Dainava did not earn promotion to A Lyga, however they were hoping for exceptions which are common in Lithuanian football. In this instance their applications were rejected on the grounds of failing to meet several critical criteria. FC Hegelmann Litauen withdrew their application prior to the licensing committee's meeting. This meant that only six teams will play in the 2020 A Lyga championship. The LFF announced that four I Lyga teams will qualify for promotion to A Lyga next season.

Home towns of the 2020 A Lyga teams

2020 A Lyga competitors
Club	Location	Stadium	Surface	Capacity	Seasons in A Lyga	2019 position
Banga	Gargždai	Gargždai Stadium	Artificial	2,323	7	2nd in LFF I lyga
Banga	Gargždai	—	—	—	7	2nd in LFF I lyga
Kauno Žalgiris	Kaunas	SM Tauras Stadium	Natural	500	6	4th
Kauno Žalgiris	Kaunas	NFA Stadium	Artificial	500	6	4th
Panevėžys	Panevėžys	Aukštaitija Stadium	Natural	6,600	2	5th
Panevėžys	Panevėžys	Žemyna Progymnasium Stadium	Artificial	500	2	5th
Riteriai	Vilnius	LFF Stadium	Artificial	5,067	7	3rd
Riteriai	Vilnius	Sportima Arena	Artificial	3,157	7	3rd
Sūduva	Marijampolė	Sūduva Stadium (Hikvision Arena)	Natural	6,250	18	1st
Sūduva	Marijampolė	Marijampolė Football Indoor Arena (Hikvision FIA)	Artificial	2,660	18	1st
Žalgiris	Vilnius	LFF Stadium	Artificial	5,067	19	2nd
Žalgiris	Vilnius	Sportima Arena	Artificial	3,157	19	2nd

=== Personnel and kits ===
Team	Head coach	Captain	Kit manufacturer	Shirt sponsor
Banga	(Lithuania) Tomas Tamošauskas	(Lithuania) Deividas Padaigis	(United States) Nike	-
Kauno Žalgiris	(Lithuania) Rokas Garastas	(Lithuania) Linas Pilibaitis	(Denmark) Hummel	BC Žalgiris
Panevėžys	(Portugal) João Luís Martins	(Lithuania) Paulius Janušauskas	(Denmark) Hummel	Kalnapilis
Riteriai	(Finland) Tommi Pikkarainen	(Lithuania) Valdemaras Borovskis	(United States) Nike	Ecoil
Sūduva	(Lithuania) Saulius Širmelis	(Lithuania) Algis Jankauskas	(Spain) Joma	Hikvision
Žalgiris	(Belarus) Aleksey Baga	(Lithuania) Saulius Mikoliūnas	(United States) Nike	Top Sport

=== Managerial changes ===
Team	Outgoing manager	Manner of departure	Date of vacancy	Incoming manager	Date of appointment
Riteriai	(Belarus) Albert Rybak	end of caretaker spell	3 January 2020	(Lithuania) Mindaugas Čepas	7 January 2020
Sūduva	(Kazakhstan) Vladimir Cheburin	contract expiry	at the end of the 2019 season	(Austria) Heimo Pfeifenberger	8 January 2020
Žalgiris	(Portugal) João Luís Martins	end of caretaker spell	27 November 2019	(Belarus) Aleksey Baga	19 January 2020
Kauno Žalgiris	(Lithuania) Mindaugas Čepas	contract expiry	2 December 2019	(Lithuania) Rokas Garastas	3 December 2019
Sūduva	(Austria) Heimo Pfeifenberger	contract termination	14 April 2020	(Lithuania) Saulius Širmelis	23 May 2020
Panevėžys	(Moldova) Alexandru Curteian	contract termination	15 June 2020	(Portugal) João Luís Martins	4 July 2020
Riteriai	(Lithuania) Mindaugas Čepas	resigned	28 June 2020	(Lithuania) Vaidas Sabaliauskas (caretaker)	28 June 2020
Riteriai	(Lithuania) Vaidas Sabaliauskas	end of caretaker spell	26 July 2020	(Poland) Janusz Niedźwiedź	26 July 2020
Riteriai	(Poland) Janusz Niedźwiedź	contract termination	1 August 2020	(Lithuania) Vaidas Sabaliauskas (caretaker)	1 August 2020
Riteriai	(Lithuania) Vaidas Sabaliauskas	end of caretaker spell	11 August 2020	(Finland) Tommi Pikkarainen	11 August 2020

== Regular season ==
On 12 March all sports events were postponed for two weeks in the light of the coronavirus pandemic.

=== League table ===
Pos	Team	Pld	W	D	L	GF	GA	GD	Pts	Qualification or relegation
1	Žalgiris (C)	20	14	3	3	42	14	+28	45	Qualification for the Champions League first qualifying round
2	Sūduva	20	13	4	3	32	18	+14	43	Qualification for the Europa Conference League first qualifying round
3	Kauno Žalgiris	20	12	2	6	30	18	+12	38	Qualification for the Europa Conference League first qualifying round
4	Banga	20	3	7	10	16	30	−14	16	
5	Panevėžys	20	2	6	12	19	38	−19	12	Qualification for the Europa Conference League second qualifying round (Note: Panevėžys qualified for the Europa Conference League as the 2020 Lithuanian Football Cup winners.)
6	Riteriai	20	2	6	12	17	38	−21	12	

Source: A Lyga (in Lithuanian), UEFA, Soccerway
Rules for classification: 1) Points; 2) Head-to-head points; 3) Head-to-head goal difference; 4) Head-to-head goals scored; 5) Head-to-head matches won; 6) Goal difference; 7) Goals scored; 8) Matches won.
(C) Champions

=== Fixtures and results ===
==== Rounds 1–10 ====
Home \ Away	BAN	KŽA	PAN	RIT	SŪD	ŽAL
Banga	—	1–1	2–0	1–1	0–2	0–1
Kauno Žalgiris	2–0	—	2–0	2–1	0–1	0–1
Panevėžys	2–1	0–2	—	2–1	1–3	1–2
Riteriai	0–1	0–3	1–1	—	1–3	0–7
Sūduva	1–0	1–0	3–0	1–0	—	1–1
Žalgiris	0–0	2–3	4–0	0–1	4–0	—

Source: A Lyga (in Lithuanian)
Legend: Blue = home team win; Yellow = draw; Red = away team win.

==== Rounds 11–20 ====
Home \ Away	BAN	KŽA	PAN	RIT	SŪD	ŽAL
Banga	—	1–2	3–3	1–1	1–2	0–4
Kauno Žalgiris	2–3	—	3–2	1–0	3–0	0–1
Panevėžys	1–1	0–1	—	1–1	1–1	1–2
Riteriai	4–0	0–1	1–1	—	1–2	2–2
Sūduva	0–0	1–1	1–0	7–1	—	2–0
Žalgiris	1–0	3–1	3–2	1–0	3–0	—

Source: A Lyga (in Lithuanian)
Legend: Blue = home team win; Yellow = draw; Red = away team win.

== Season statistics ==
=== Top scorers ===
Rank	Player	Club	Goals
1	(France) Hugo Vidémont	Žalgiris	13
2	(Croatia) Josip Tadić	Sūduva	11
3	(Lithuania) Linas Pilibaitis	Kauno Žalgiris	8
4	(Romania) Liviu Antal	Žalgiris	6
5	(Austria) Mihret Topčagić	Sūduva	5
5	(Brazil) Jorge Elias	Panevėžys	5
6	(Nigeria) Emmanuel David	Kauno Žalgiris	4
6	(Ukraine) Yuriy Bushman	Kauno Žalgiris	4
6	(Bosnia and Herzegovina) Semir Kerla	Sūduva	4
6	(Latvia) Valērijs Šabala	Sūduva	4
6	(Canada) Richie Ennin	Žalgiris	4
6	(Serbia) Andrija Kaluđerović	Žalgiris	4

Updated to match(es) played on 1 September 2020.
Source: soccerway.com

== See also ==
- 2020 LFF I Lyga
- Football in Lithuania
- 2020 Lithuanian Football Cup
