= 2022 Lithuanian Football Cup =

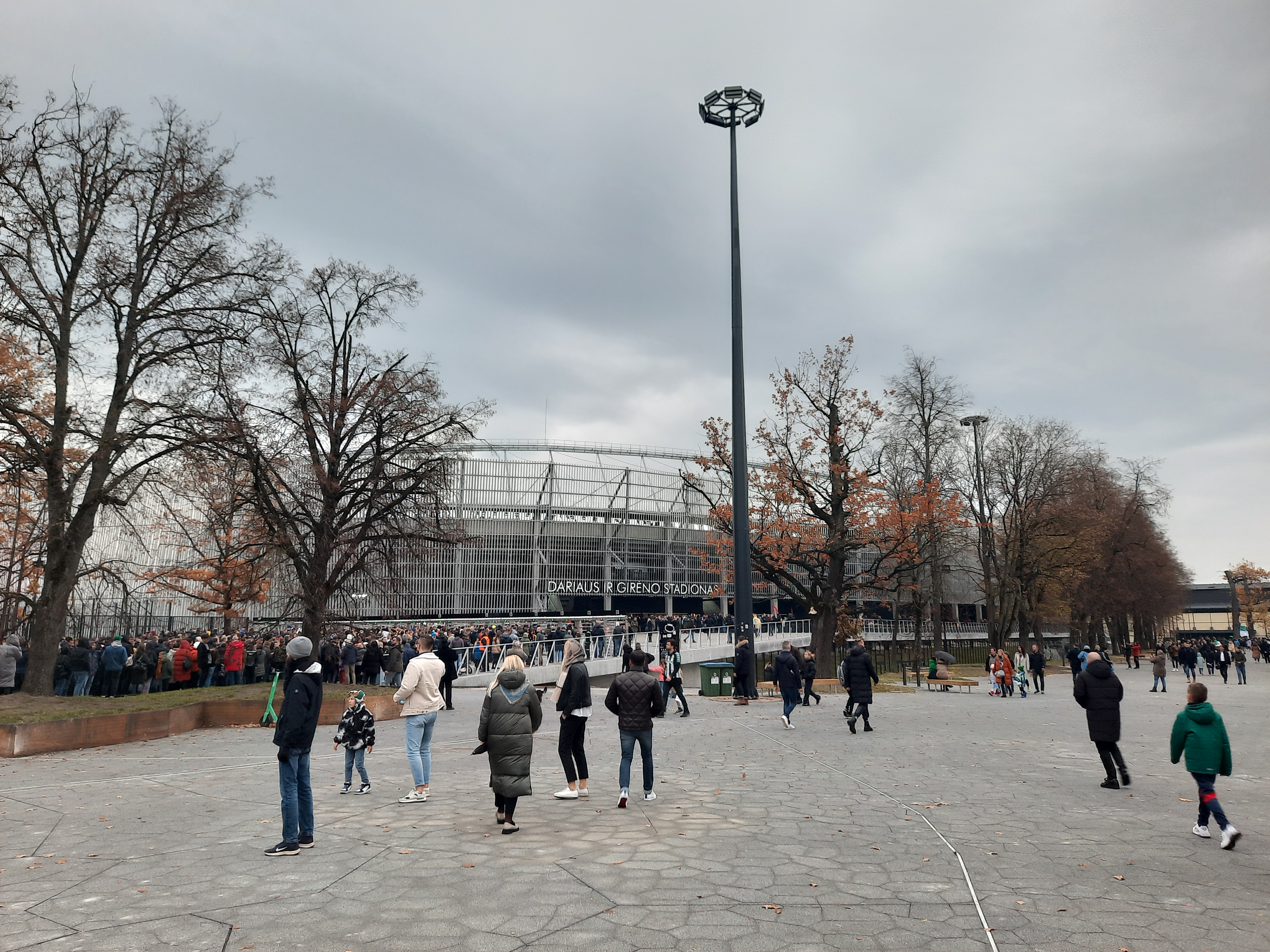
- Darius and Girėnas Stadium hosted the final on 16 October 2022

Tournament details
- Country: Lithuania
- Teams: 54

Final positions
- Champions: FK Žalgiris
- Runners-up: FC Hegelmann

Tournament statistics
- Matches played: 53
- Goals scored: 226 (4.26 per match)

The 2022 Lithuanian Football Cup, for sponsorship reasons also called Lithuanian: Hegelmann LFF Taurė is a single elimination football tournament in Lithuania. The winner of the competition earns a spot in the first qualifying round of the 2023–24 UEFA Europa Conference League.

Having had participants numbers limited to the first three tiers for the last two years, this year's tournament was open to clubs from any division. As before, the "B" teams do not participate in the cup competition. The A lyga teams entered the tournament from the second round this year. A total number of participants this year was 54: 10 A lyga clubs, 11 LFF I lyga clubs, 11 LFF II lyga clubs, 17 LFF III lyga clubs and 5 SFL clubs.

== Draw and match calendar ==
Round	Draw dates	Match dates	Teams	Participants
Round I	April 15	April 21-26	44	Clubs from I, II, III ir SFL leagues
Round of 32	April 27	May 6-8	32	22 Round I winners and 10 A lyga clubs
Round of 16	May 11	May 17-18/24-25	16	Winners of the Round of 32
Quarterfinals	June 17	August 16 - September 14	8	Winners of the Round of 16
Semifinals	September 8	October 1-5	4	Winners of the Quarterfinals
Final		October 16	2	Winners of the Semifinals

=== Round I ===
Team 1	Score	Team 2
VGTU Vilkai Vilnius (III lyga)	0:2	Klaipėdos FM (II lyga)
AFK Vilnius (III lyga)	0:8	FK Ekranas Panevėžys (I lyga)
FK Trivartis Vilnius (SFL D lyga)	0:4	FK Venta Kuršėnai (III lyga)
FK Nemunas Prienai (III lyga)	1:4	FK Garliava (I lyga)
FK Transinvest Vilnius (II lyga)	6:0	FSK Radviliškis (II lyga)
FK Ataka Vilnius (SFL B lyga)	8:1	Kražantė Kelmė (III lyga)
FK Minija Kretinga (I lyga)	0:2	DFK Dainava Alytus (I lyga)
SC Baltai Kaišiadorys (SFL A lyga)	1:4	FK Medžiai Vilnius (III lyga)
FK Nevėžis Kėdainiai (I lyga)	1:2	Marijampolė City (FK Šilas) (I lyga)
FM Ateitis Vilnius (LFF II lyga)	0:6	FK Neptūnas Klaipėda (I lyga)
FK Nadruvis Šakiai (III lyga)	0:10	FK Granitas Vilnius (III lyga)
FK Kazlų Rūda-Švyturys (III lyga)	1:7	FK Babrungas Plungė (I lyga)
Pakruojo SC (III lyga)	2:5	FK Tauras Tauragė (II lyga)
SK Saulininkas Šiauliai (III lyga)	0:6	FK Viltis Vilnius (II lyga)
FK Pozityvūs Veiveriai (III lyga)	1:4	FK Utenos Utenis (II lyga)
SK Ave.Ko. Vilnius (SFL A lyga)	0:3	FK Atmosfera Mažeikiai (I lyga)
FK Šilutė (II lyga)	2:4	FK Saned Joniškis (II lyga)
FK Top Kickers Vilnius (SFL A lyga)	2:3	FK Dembava Panevėžys (III lyga)
FM Fortūna Kaunas (II lyga)	0:6	Be1 NFA Kaunas (I lyga)
FK Sveikata Kybartai (II lyga)	0:0, 0:3 (a.e.t.)	BFA Vilnius (I lyga)
EDM Statyba-Sendvaris Klaipėda (III lyga)	0:0, 1:2 (a.e.t.)	FK Šturmas Kaunas (III lyga)
FKS Ukmergė (III lyga)	1:0	FK Geležinis Vilkas Vilnius (III lyga)

=== Round of 32 ===
Team 1	Score	Team 2
FK Granitas Vilnius (III lyga)	8:0	FK Venta Kuršėnai (III lyga)
FK Babrungas Plungė (I lyga)	1:2	BFA Vilnius (I lyga)
FK Šturmas Kaunas (III lyga)	1:8	DFK Dainava Alytus (I lyga)
FK Žalgiris Vilnius (A lyga)	3:1	FC Džiugas Telšiai (A lyga)
FK Utenos Utenis (II lyga)	0:5	FK Panevėžys (A lyga)
FK Garliava (I lyga)	0:2	FK Neptūnas Klaipėda (I lyga)
FK Ataka Vilnius (SFL B lyga)	3:2	FK Dembava Panevėžys (III lyga)
Klaipėdos FM (II lyga)	1:4	FK Kauno Žalgiris (A lyga)
FK Ekranas (I lyga)	0:3	FK Sūduva Marijampolė (A lyga)
FK Riteriai Vilnius (A lyga)	2:1	FA Šiauliai (A lyga)
FK Atmosfera Mažeikiai (I lyga)	0:3	FK Jonava (A lyga)
FK Saned Joniškis (II lyga)	3:3, 3:7 (a.e.t.)	Marijampolė City (I lyga)
FKS Ukmergė (III lyga)	0:2	FK Transinvest Vilnius (II lyga)
Be1 NFA Kaunas (I lyga)	0:3	FC Hegelmann Kaunas (A lyga)
FK Medžiai Vilnius (III lyga)	1:2	FK Banga (A lyga)
FK Tauras (II lyga)	1:1; (4:2 p)	FK Viltis Vilnius (II lyga)

=== Round of 16 ===
Team 1	Score	Team 2
FK Sūduva Marijampolė (A lyga)	2:0	FK Banga Gargždai (A lyga)
FK Transinvest Vilnius (II lyga)	1:2	FK Jonava (A lyga)
FK Tauras Tauragė (II lyga)	1:4	Marijampolė City (I lyga)
DFK Dainava Alytus (I lyga)	0:2	FK Panevėžys (A lyga)
FK Neptūnas Klaipėda (I lyga)	0:1	FK Žalgiris Vilnius (A lyga)
FK Granitas Vilnius (III lyga)	0:4	FK Kauno Žalgiris (A lyga)
BFA Vilnius (I lyga)	0:6	FC Hegelmann Kauno raj. (A lyga)
FK Ataka Vilnius (SFL B lyga)	1:5	FK Riteriai Vilnius (A lyga)

=== Quarterfinals ===
Team 1	Score	Team 2
FK Sūduva (A lyga)	0:1	FK Kauno Žalgiris (A lyga)
FK Jonava (A lyga)	0:2	FC Hegelmann (A lyga)
FK Žalgiris (A lyga)	2:1	FK Riteriai (A lyga)
Marijampolė City (I lyga)	0:2	FK Panevėžys (A lyga)

=== Semifinals ===
Team 1	Score	Team 2
FK Žalgiris	1:1, 2:1 (a.e.t.)	FK Kauno Žalgiris
FC Hegelmann	0:0, (4:3 p)	FK Panevėžys

=== Final ===
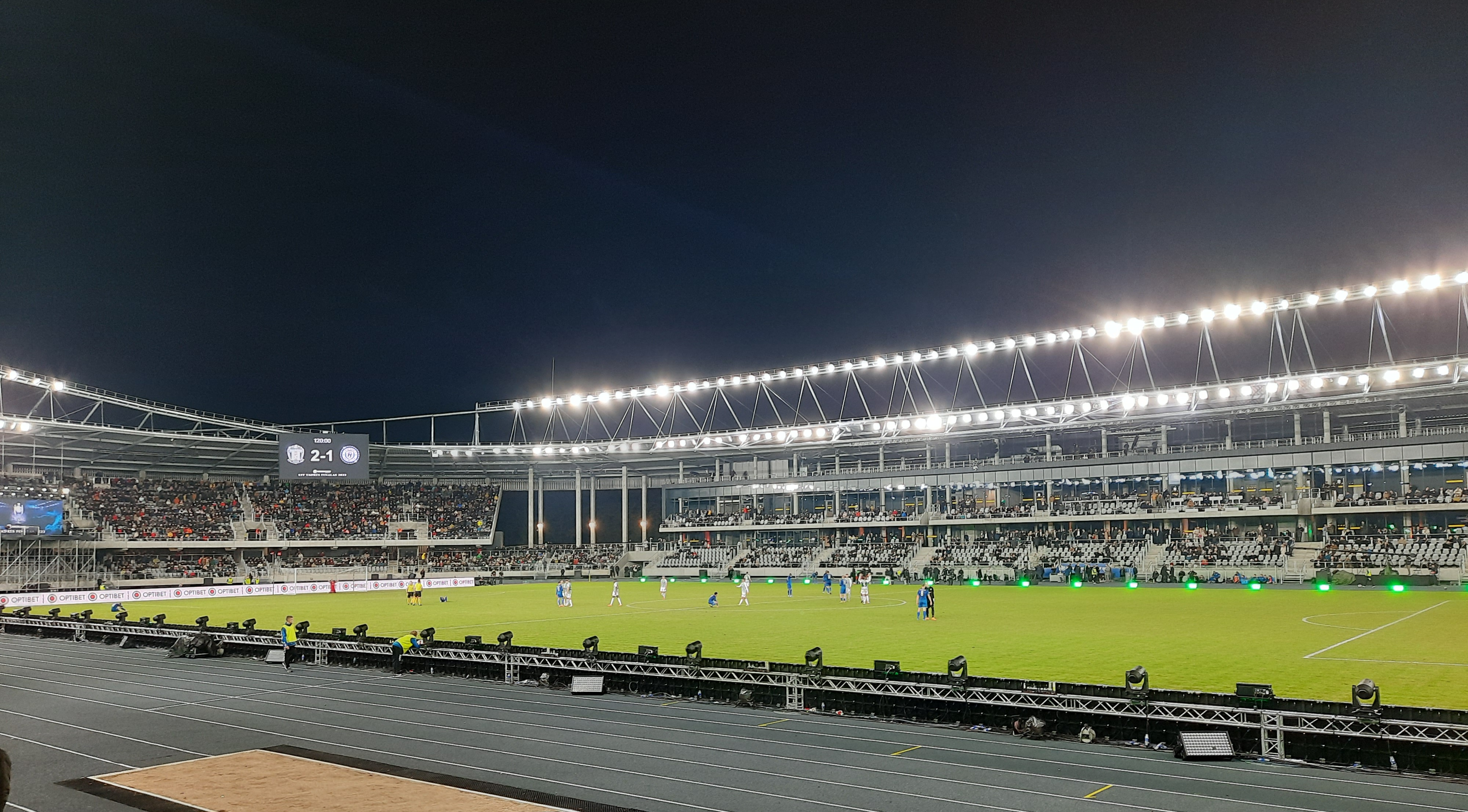
The Darius and Girėnas Stadium during the final

16 October 2022
17:30

Žalgiris	2:1 (a.e.t.)	Hegelmann
Marko Milićković 76'; Mario Pavelić 110'	summary report	90+4' Samuel Odeyobo

Darius and Girėnas Stadium, Kaunas
Attendance: 13,589
Referee: Manfredas Lukjančukas

== See also ==
- 2022 A Lyga
