= FK Riteriai =

Lithuanian football club

Riteriai
- Full name: Futbolo Klubas Riteriai
- Nickname: Riteriai (The Knights)
- Founded: 2005; 21 years ago as FK Trakai
- Ground: LFF Stadium
- Capacity: 5,067
- Coordinates: 54°40′07″N 25°17′39″E
- League: TOPLYGA
- 2025: A Lyga, 9th of 10
- Website: fkriteriai.lt
Home colours	Away colours

Futbolo Klubas Riteriai, also known as FK Riteriai or as Riteriai, is a Lithuanian professional football club based in Vilnius. Until 21 February 2019, the club was based in Trakai and was known as FK Trakai. The team won the 2024 I Lyga and earned promotion to the A Lyga after a one-year absence.

Riteriai, meaning "Knights" in Lithuanian, has volt green and dark blue as its team colors, previously yellow and blue before 2019. The club plays at the LFF Stadium in Vilnius, which has a capacity of 5,067.

== History ==
Logo of the team when it was known as FK Trakai.

=== 2005–2013 ===
The club was established in 2005 as a way to promote physical activity to children and the general society. In 2006, the club laid an artificial coverage stadium in Trakai and started to play in the III Lyga Vilnius County. In 2008, they also played in the Sunday Football League. In 2010, they were admitted to the II Lyga South Zone, and in 2011, they were already in the I Lyga (second-tier division in Lithuania). Before the 2013 season, the club submitted an application to play in the A Lyga, as all three top finishers decided against seeking promotion, promising to play games in Vilnius before adequate infrastructure requirements could be fulfilled, but ultimately remained in the same tier. They were promoted to A Lyga after finishing 3rd in the 2013 LFF I Lyga season. The club also reached the semi-finals of the 2013–14 Lithuanian Football Cup, before being eliminated by the eventual winners, VMFD Žalgiris. During summer, the club organized youth camps with invitees from AC Milan.

=== 2014–2016 ===
The club began preparation for the 2014 campaign by strengthening their first team, which included signing Lithuanian national team veterans, Paulius Grybauskas, Vytautas Lukša, Darius Miceika, and Tadas Labukas, as well as unveiling former star Edgaras Jankauskas as their new head coach. They debuted in the A Lyga victoriously, beating Klaipėdos Granitas 2–0. Throughout the season, the club's results plateaued, but they managed to climb up to second place around the mid-season break. Trakai continued to strengthen their core and staff personnel through mid-season. On 19 September 2014, another national team star, Deividas Česnauskis, was signed on. Soon afterwards, the club was eliminated from the 2014–15 Lithuanian Football Cup by Šilas. With 7 matches remaining, Trakai was still in 2nd place in the league, but a losing streak followed. On 3 November 2014, Jankauskas was fired by the club. Virmantas Lemežis took over as caretaker and managed to stabilize things. As a result, the team finished in 4th place, qualifying for the 2015–16 UEFA Europa League. On 27 November 2014, Trakai announced the signing of the former Ekranas manager, Valdas Urbonas, as development director, but during the club's season roundup event, he was announced as new manager for the upcoming season. The Trakai reserve team also finished third in the A Lyga's reserves competitions that season.

In 2015, some veteran players left the team. On 2 July 2015, FK Trakai debuted in the UEFA Europa League qualification round against HB Torshavn from the Faroe Islands. Trakai won 7–1. However, the club lost in the Europa League's second qualifying round to the Cypriot club Apollon Limassol. In the first leg, Trakai lost 4–0, while in the second leg, they drew 0–0. In the 2015 A Lyga season, Trakai reached second place and became the vice-champion of Lithuania and qualified to 2016–17 UEFA Europa League's first qualifying round. It was the club's most successful season yet.

Before the 2016 A Lyga season, the top 2015 season defenders, Linas Klimavičius, Edvardas Gaurilovas, Nikolaz Apakitze, Sergej Shevchuk, Marius Šalkauskas, Ronald Solomin and Rokas Stanulevičius, left the team. But the team managed to keep last season's leaders, Yuri Mamaev, Marius Rapalis, and Deividas Česnauskis. Trakai could keep the core of the team and signed contracts with a few newcomers. The team signed a legionnaire from Italy, Mattia Broli, and former Lithuanian national football players, Arūnas Klimavičius, and Martynas Dapkus. In the 2015–16 Lithuanian Cup, Trakai reached the final after beating FK Sūduva in the semi-finals, but lost the final 0–1 against FK Žalgiris after extra time. Like in the previous season, they finished the 2016 A Lyga campaign in second place.

=== 2017–2021 ===
Trakai started the 2017 A Lyga with newly appointed head coach Oleg Vasilenko. They reached third place at the end of the season, and reached the quarter-finals of the 2017 Lithuanian Football Cup, where they lost 1–4 against FK Sūduva.

In 2018, the team saw a change in coaching. In May, Oleg Vasilenko was fired, and Kibu Vicuña was hired as the team's head coach. He worked with the team during the second half of the 2018 A Lyga season and in the 2018–19 Europa League qualification rounds, in which Trakai managed to beat Welsh club Cefn Druids and Kazakh side FC Irtysh Pavlodar to reach the third qualification round, but then lost against Serbian team FK Partizan. Vicuña left Trakai in October to join Polish side Wisła Płock. At the end of the 2018 season, Trakai reached third place in the league. In the 2018 Lithuanian Football Cup, the dropped out of the competition after losing 0–3 against Sūduva in the round of 16.

Before the 2019 season, the club officially moved from Trakai to Vilnius and renamed to FK Riteriai. Aurelijus Skarbalius became head coach of the club in December 2018. After the club lost against KÍ Klaksvík in the first qualification round of the 2019–20 UEFA Europa League, he withdrew from his position and left the club. Like in the previous two seasons, Riteriai finished the 2019 league campaign in third position. In the 2019 Lithuanian Football Cup, the club reached the round of 16, where they lost on penalties against FK Kauno Žalgiris.

In January 2020, Mindaugas Čepas was appointed as the new head coach of the team. In the 2020 season, Riteriai was one of only six competing teams in the A Lyga, since several teams were excluded from the league by the Lithuanian Football Federation due to manipulation of the match results in the 2019 season. Riteriai started the 2020 season on 8 March with a 0–3 defeat against Kauno Žalgiris. Afterwards, the league was suspended for over two months because of the COVID-19 pandemic. League play resumed on 30 May 2020, and on the second matchday, Riteriai beat FK Žalgiris 1–0. But only one month later, on 28 June, Riteriai suffered a devastating 0–7 defeat against FK Žalgiris, which lead to the resignation of manager Čepas. On 11 August, Tommi Pikkarainen was appointed as the new head coach. At the end of the season, Riteriai only won two out of 20 league games and collected 12 points. They finished the league campaign in last place. However, since the Lithuanian Football Federation wanted to expand the A Lyga to ten competing teams, no team was relegated, and Riteriai remained in the A Lyga in the 2021 season. In the 2020 Lithuanian Football Cup, Riteriai reached the semi-finals, where they were defeated 0–4 by FK Panevėžys.

Prior to the start of the 2021 A Lyga, Sergei Gurenko was appointed as the new manager of Riteriai. He left the club at the end of May. Prior to his departure, the team dropped to sixth place in A Lyga after earning only two points in the last five matches under Gurenko. Riteriai finished the season in sixth place.

=== 2022–2025 ===
In January 2022, Glenn Ståhl was appointed as the new manager of Riteriai. On 7 May 2022, he resigned from his position and left the club. He led the club in twelve official games, during which it won 21 points. Pablo Villar took over as the new manager on 24 May 2022. In the 2022 Lithuanian Football Cup, Riteriai reached the quarter-finals, where they were defeated 1–2 by FK Žalgiris. In the 2022 A Lyga, they reached fifth place.

After a poor start to the 2023 season with only one point out of the first four league matches, Villar was sacked on 24 March 2023. He was succeeded by Vladimir Janković on 31 March. On 25 July, Janković was sacked. Portuguese coach Matthew Silva, who coached the Riteriai B team (second team) in the I Lyga, was promoted to be the head coach of the first team one day later. In the 2023 Lithuanian Football Cup, Riteriai reached the quarter-finals, where they were defeated 0–2 by FA Šiauliai. The club ended the 2023 league campaign in the last place and therefore was relegated to the second division after ten consecutive seasons in the first division.

=== 2026–present ===
On 27 January 2026 was signed an agreement to sell parts of the club to the Dutch football education academy “4ThePlayers Academy”.

== Stadium ==
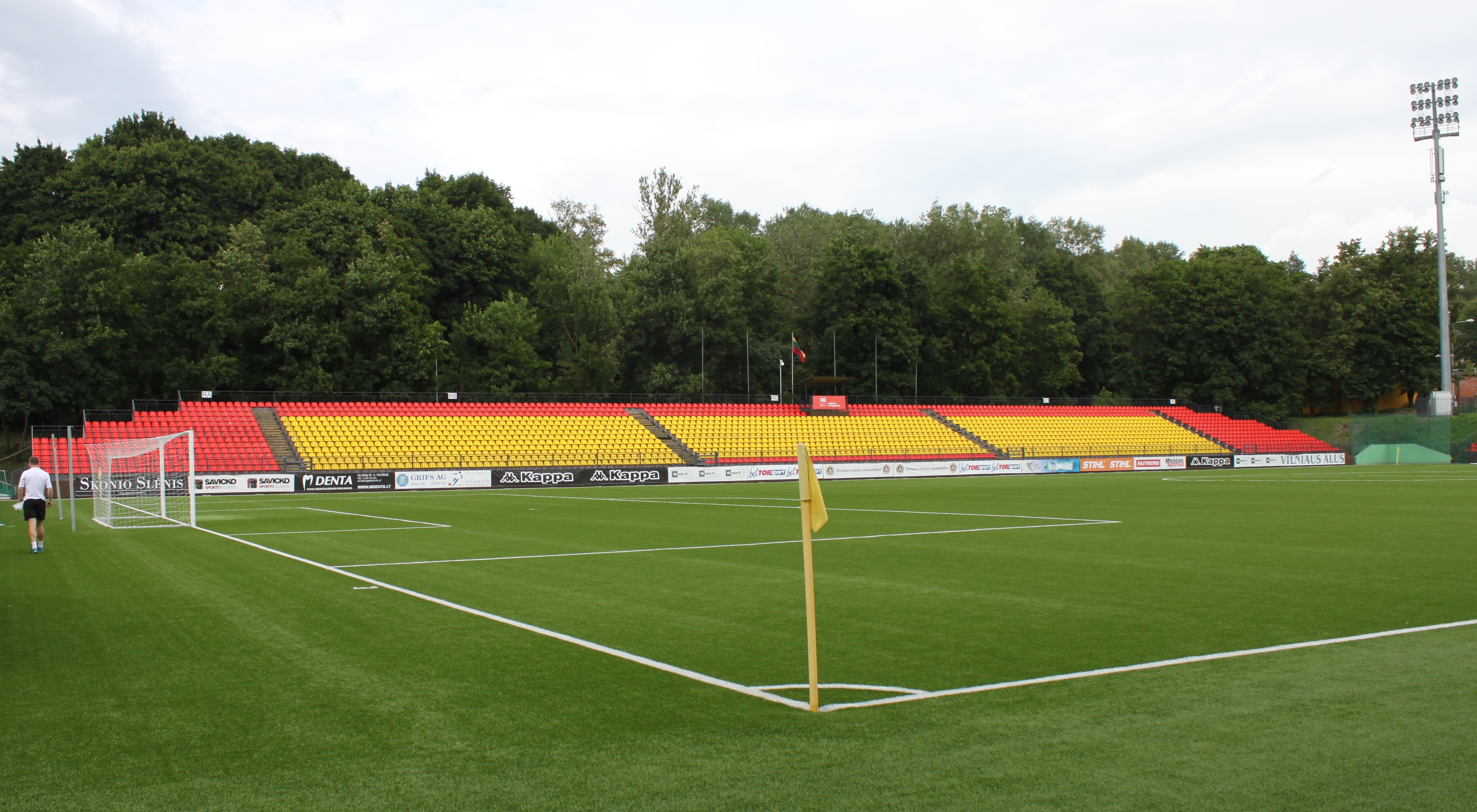
LFF stadium's Eastern stand.

Since 2014, the club has played at LFF Stadium in Vilnius. The stadium, formerly known as Vėtra Stadium, was built in 2004 and holds up to 5,500 spectators. After the bankruptcy of the FK Vėtra football club, the Lithuanian Football Federation took control of the stadium. The stadium is under reconstruction in an effort to meet level 3 UEFA stadium status, with the capacity expected to be extended to 8,000.

== Academy ==
FK Riteriai run their own football academy, which keeps close relationship with AC Milan. The academy is called Talentų futbolo akademija, it was established in 2013.

== Achievements ==
- A Lyga
  - Runners-up (2): 2015, 2016
  - Third place (3): 2017, 2018, 2019
- I Lyga
  - Winners (1): 2024
- Lithuanian Cup
  - Runners-up (1): 2015/2016
- Lithuanian Super Cup
  - Runners-up (2): 2016, 2017

== Season by season ==
Season	Tier	League	Pos.	LFF Cup
2006	4	III Lyga	4	—
2007	4	III Lyga	8	—
2008	4	III Lyga	7	—
2009	4	III Lyga	13	—
2010	3	II Lyga	4	First round
2011	2	I Lyga	4	Fourth round
2012	2	I Lyga	4	Fourth round
2013	2	I Lyga	3	Semi-finals
2014	1	A Lyga	4	Third round
2015	1	A Lyga	2	Final
2016	1	A Lyga	2	Round of 16
2017	1	A Lyga	3	Quarter-finals
2018	1	A Lyga	3	Round of 16
2019	1	A Lyga	3	Round of 16
2020	1	A Lyga	6	Semi-finals
2021	1	A Lyga	6	First round
2022	1	A Lyga	5	Quarter-finals
2023	1	A Lyga	10	Quarter-finals
2024	2	I Lyga	1	Round of 32
2025	1	A Lyga	9	Round of 32

== Kit ==
From 2014 to 2018, FK Trakai's home kits were yellow, while away kits were black and red, resembling those of AC Milan. In 2018, the away kits changed to dark blue.

Following the club's rebranding as FK Riteriai in 2019, the uniforms adopted the new team colors: volt green for the home kit and dark blue for the away kit.

2006–2013 (home kit)	2006–2013 (away kit)	2014–2018 (home kit)	2014–2017 (away kit)	2018 (away kit)	2019–present (home kit)	2019–present (away kit)

=== Uniform manufacturers ===
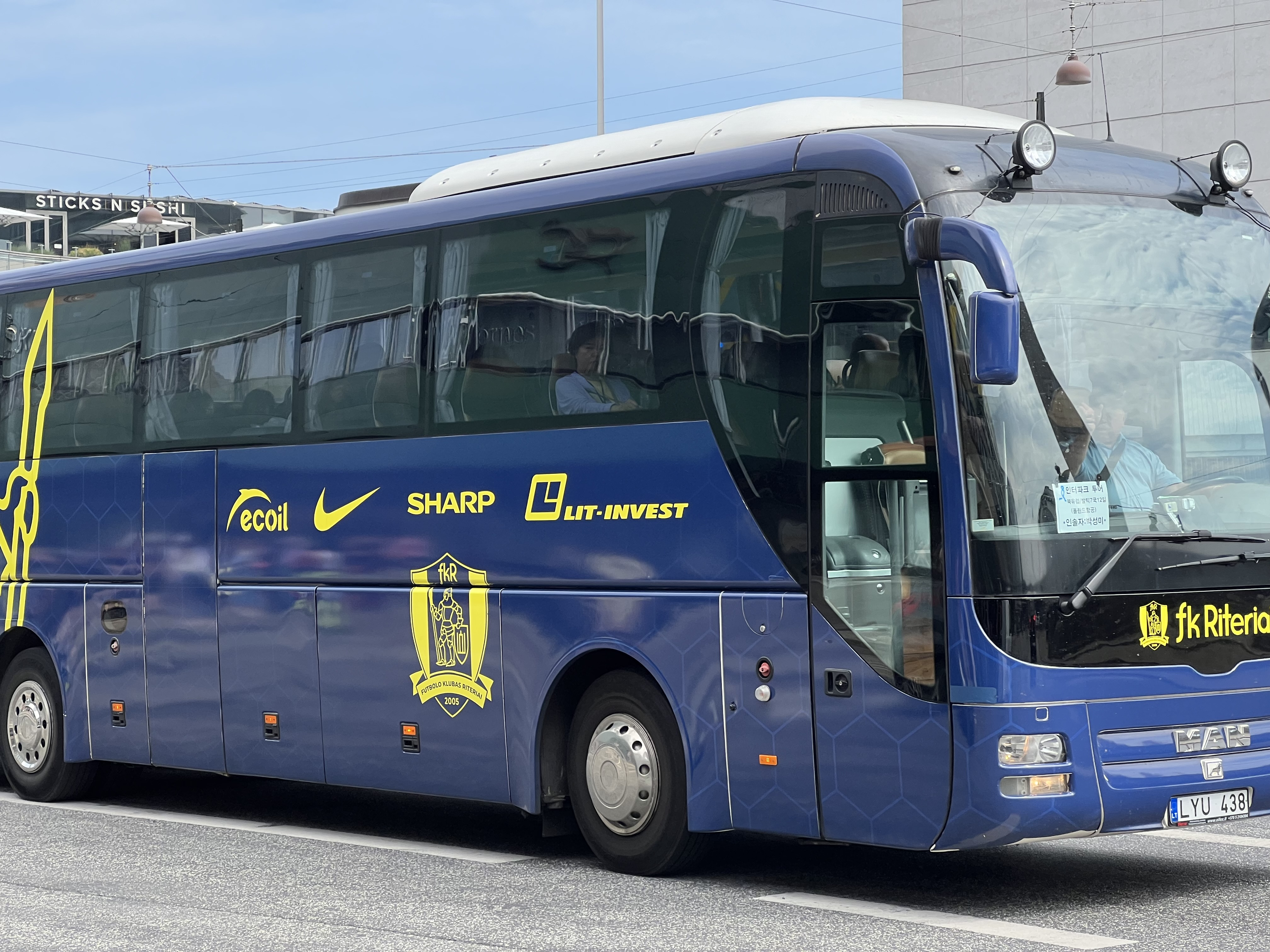
Main sponsors of the club

- 2011–2014: Patrick
- 2015–present: Nike

== European record ==
Accurate as of 26 August 2020

Competition	Played	Won	Drew	Lost	GF	GA	GD	Win%
UEFA Cup / UEFA Europa League	21	10	6	5	26	24	+2	47.62
Total	21	10	6	5	26	24	+2	47.62

Source: UEFA.com
Pld = Matches played; W = Matches won; D = Matches drawn; L = Matches lost; GF = Goals for; GA = Goals against; GD = Goal Difference. Defunct competitions indicated in italics.

Season	Competition	Round	Opponent	Home	Away	Aggregate
2015–16	UEFA Europa League	1Q	(Faroe Islands) HB Tórshavn	3–0	4–1	7–1
2015–16	UEFA Europa League	2Q	(Cyprus) Apollon Limassol	0–0	0–4	0–4
2016–17	UEFA Europa League	1Q	(Estonia) Nõmme Kalju FC	2–1	1–4	3–5
2017–18	UEFA Europa League	1Q	(Scotland) St Johnstone	1–0	2–1	3–1
2017–18	UEFA Europa League	2Q	(Sweden) IFK Norrköping	2–1	1–2	3–3 (5–3 p)
2017–18	UEFA Europa League	3Q	(North Macedonia) Shkëndija	2–1	0–3	2–4
2018–19	UEFA Europa League	PR	(Wales) Cefn Druids	1–0	1−1	2–1
2018–19	UEFA Europa League	1Q	(Kazakhstan) Irtysh Pavlodar	0−0	1–0	1–0
2018–19	UEFA Europa League	2Q	(Serbia) Partizan	1−1	0–1	1–2
2019–20	UEFA Europa League	1Q	(Faroe Islands) KÍ Klaksvík	1−1	0−0	1−1 (a)
2020–21	UEFA Europa League	1Q	(Republic of Ireland) Derry City	3−2 (a.e.t.)	—N/a	—N/a
2020–21	UEFA Europa League	2Q	(Czech Republic) Slovan Liberec	1−5	—N/a	—N/a

Notes

- PR: Preliminary round
- 1Q: First qualifying round
- 2Q: Second qualifying round
- 3Q: Third qualifying round

== Current squad ==
As of 3 August 2026

Note: Flags indicate national team as defined under FIFA eligibility rules; some limited exceptions apply. Players may hold more than one non-FIFA nationality.

No.	Pos.	Nation	Player
2	DF	UKR	Dmytro Bondar
3	DF	USA	Vukašin Bulatović
5	DF	LTU	Milanas Rutkovskis
6	MF	LTU	Armandas Šveistrys
10	MF	LTU	Simas Civilka
11	MF	LTU	Arvydas Novikovas
16	MF	LTU	Jonas Usavičius
17	DF	LTU	Daumantas Lipinskas
21	FW	LTU	Tautvydas Alekna
22	MF	GER	Leif Estevez
23	MF	LTU	Deimantas Rimpa

No.	Pos.	Nation	Player
26	GK	ITA	Simone Moschin
27	MF	LTU	Dominykas Gelombickas
32	DF	MNE	Vasilije Radenović
35	DF	LTU	Petro Harapko
37	GK	LTU	Artiom Šankin
47	MF	LTU	Vakaris Gurkšnys
50	DF	LTU	Matas Latvys
77	FW	LTU	Ernestas Zdanovič
92	GK	LTU	Kajus Andraikėnas
—	FW	TRI	Michael Kedman

== Notable players ==
Players who have either appeared in at least one match for their respective national teams at any time or received an individual award while at the club. Players whose names are listed in bold represented their countries while playing for FK Trakai or FK Riteriai.

Lithuania

- (Lithuania) **Valdemar Borovskij**
- (Lithuania) **Deividas Česnauskis**
- (Lithuania) Martynas Dapkus
- (Lithuania) Paulius Grybauskas
- (Lithuania) **Justinas Januševskij**
- (Lithuania) **Donatas Kazlauskas**
- (Lithuania) **Arūnas Klimavičius**
- (Lithuania) **Linas Klimavičius**
- (Lithuania) Tadas Labukas
- (Lithuania) **Vytautas Lukša**
- (Lithuania) **Justinas Marazas**
- (Lithuania) Darius Miceika
- (Lithuania) Marius Rapalis
- (Lithuania) Vaidotas Šilėnas
- (Lithuania) **Tomas Švedkauskas**
- (Lithuania) **Nerijus Valskis**
- (Lithuania) **Modestas Vorobjovas**

Europe

- (Russia) Diniyar Bilyaletdinov
- (Armenia) David Arshakyan
- (Belarus) Alyaksandr Bychanok
- (Belarus) Yury Kendysh
- (Cyprus) Giorgos Pelagias
- (Moldova) **Eugen Zasavițchi**
- (Russia) Yuri Mamaev

Africa

- (Liberia) **Oscar Dorley**

Asia

- (Singapore) **Ryhan Stewart**

== Trakai Player of the Year ==
Since 2014, a Player of the Year award is presented during an annual season closeup event. From 2014 to 2016, nominees were elected by Trakai players. However, since 2017, the award is determined by using InStat data.

Year	Winner
2014	(Lithuania) Vytautas Lukša
2015	(Russia) Yuri Mamaev
2016	(Lithuania) Arūnas Klimavičius
2017	(Ukraine) Mykhailo Shyshka
2018	(Lithuania) Donatas Kazlauskas
2019	(Nigeria) Terem Moffi

== Staff ==
- (Lithuania) Gintautas Vaičiūnas – head coach

== Manager history ==
Name	Period
(Lithuania) Edgaras Jankauskas	Feb 2014 – Nov 2014
(Lithuania) Virmantas Lemežis	Nov 2014 – Dec 2014
(Lithuania) Valdas Urbonas	Jan 2015 – Jul 2016
(Belarus) Albert Rybak	Jul 2016 – Aug 2016
(Ukraine) Serhiy Kovalets	Aug 2016 – Jan 2017
(Russia) Oleg Vasilenko	Jan 2017 – May 2018
(Lithuania) Virmantas Lemežis	May 2018 – Jun 2018
(Spain) Kibu Vicuña	Jun 2018 – Oct 2018
(Belarus) Albert Rybak	Oct 2018 – Dec 2018
(Lithuania) Aurelijus Skarbalius	Dec 2018 – Jul 2019.
(Belarus) Albert Rybak	Jul 2019 – Nov 2019
(Lithuania) Mindaugas Čepas	Jan 2020 – Jun 2020
(Poland) Janusz Niedzvied	Jul 2020 – Aug 2020
(Finland) Tommi Pikkarainen	Aug 2020 – Nov 2020
(Belarus) Sergei Gurenko	Feb 2021 – May 2021
(Lithuania) Valdas Trakys	9 June 2021 – 3 August 2021 (temporary)
(Portugal) Miguel Moreira	3 August 2021 – 30 November 2021
(Sweden) Glenn Ståhl	January 2022 – 7 May 2022
(Spain) Pablo Villar	24 May 2022 – 24 March 2023
(Serbia) Vladimir Janković	31 March 2023 – 25 July 2023
(Portugal) Matthew Silva	26 July 2023 – 16 November 2023
(Poland) Sławomir Cisakowski	14 February 2024 – 16 January 2025
(Cyprus) Nicolas Vitorović	14 February 2025 – 3 July 2025
(Lithuania) Gintautas Vaičiūnas	3 July 2025 – 15 May 2026
