= Dzmitry Rekish =

Belarusian footballer

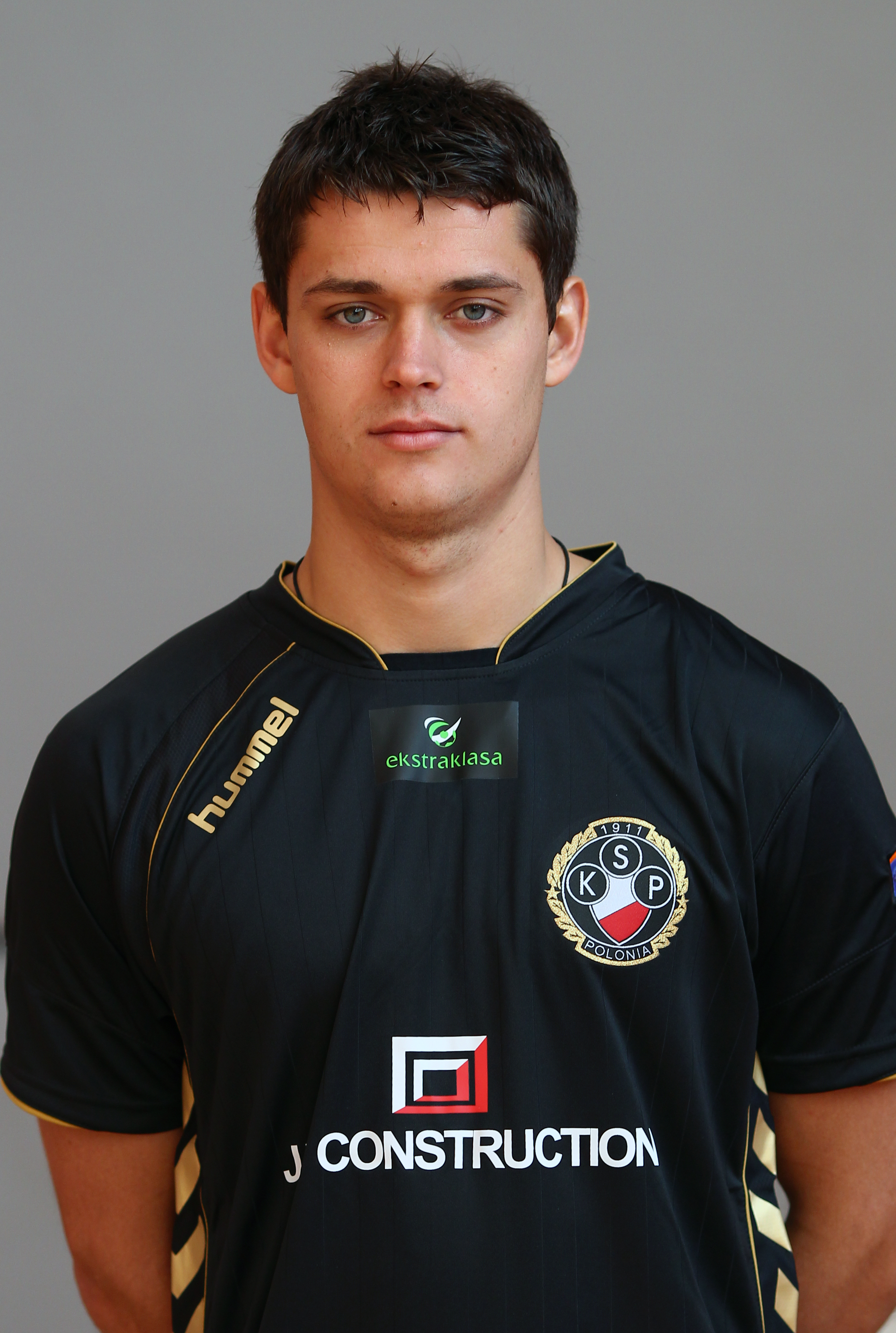

Personal information
- Full name: Dzmitry Vasilevich Rekish
- Date of birth: 14 September 1988 (age 38)
- Place of birth: Bobruisk, Mogilev Oblast, Byelorussian SSR, Soviet Union
- Height: 1.85 m (6 ft 1 in)
- Position: Midfielder

Team information
- Current team: Orbi Tbilisi
- Number: 15

Youth career
- 2004–2006: Dinamo Minsk

Senior career*
Years	Team	Apps	(Gls)
2003	RUOR Minsk	1	(0)
2006–2011	Dinamo Minsk	54	(6)
2008	→ Savit Mogilev (loan)	26	(4)
2011	→ Polonia Warsaw (loan)	0	(0)
2012	Torpedo-BelAZ Zhodino	15	(0)
2013	Neman Grodno	17	(1)
2013	Třinec	5	(1)
2014	Neman Grodno	20	(3)
2015	Spyris Kaunas	35	(11)
2016	Trakai	12	(2)
2016–2017	Torpedo-BelAZ Zhodino	42	(7)
2018	Fakel Voronezh	8	(0)
2018	TIRA-Persikabo	12	(3)
2019	Isloch Minsk Raion	22	(1)
2020	Belshina Bobruisk	24	(6)
2021	Torpedo Kutaisi	35	(4)
2022	Samtredia	14	(0)
2022	Telavi	6	(0)
2023	Guria Lanchkhuti		
2023–	Orbi Tbilisi		

International career
	Belarus U17	10	(0)
	Belarus U19	5	(1)
2008–2011	Belarus U21	27	(8)
- * Club domestic league appearances and goals as of 14 September 2024

Dzmitry Vasilevich Rekish (Belarusian: Дзмітрый Васілевіч Рэкіш; Russian: Дмитрий Васильевич Рекиш; born 14 September 1988) is a Belarusian professional footballer who plays for as a midfielder for Orbi Tbilisi.

== Career ==
=== Club ===
Born in Babruysk, Rekish began playing football in FC Dinamo Minsk's youth system. He played for RUOR Minsk in the Second Division before joining Dinamo's senior team where he made his Belarusian Premier League debut in 2006.

In February 2011, he was loaned to Polonia Warsaw on a half year deal.

=== International ===
He featured for the Belarus under-21 national team. Rekish was a member of the U21 team that finished in 3rd place at the 2011 UEFA European Under-21 Football Championship. He appeared as a substitute in four of the matches.
