= João Martins =

João Martins is the name of:

- João Baptista Martins (1927–1993), Portuguese football forward
- João Carlos Martins (born 1940), Brazilian classical pianist
- João Cleófas Martins (1901–1970), Cape Verdean photographer
- João Luís Martins (born 1967), Portuguese football defender
- João Paulo Neto Martins (born 1988), Portuguese football midfielder
- João Pedro Pinto Martins (born 1982), Angolan football forward
