= Yuri Mamaev =

Russian footballer

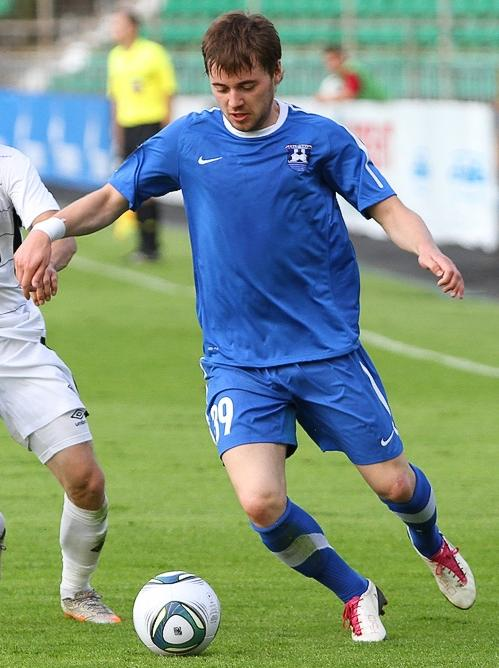
- Mamaev with Baltika Kaliningrad in 2011

Personal information
- Full name: Yuri Igorevich Mamaev
- Date of birth: 3 February 1984 (age 42)
- Place of birth: Omsk, Soviet Union
- Height: 1.81 m (5 ft 11 1/2 in)
- Position: Midfielder

Youth career
- 2001–2002: Sonnenhof Großaspach
- 2002–2003: VfB Stuttgart

Senior career*
Years	Team	Apps	(Gls)
2003–2005	VfB Stuttgart II	36	(2)
2006–2007	Shinnik Yaroslavl	5	(0)
2008	Terek Grozny	1	(0)
2008	Chornomorets Odesa	0	(0)
2009	Luch-Energiya Vladivostok	30	(4)
2010–2011	Baltika Kaliningrad	39	(2)
2012	Daugava Daugavpils	16	(0)
2012–2013	Luch-Energiya Vladivostok	11	(0)
2013	Petrotrest Saint Petersburg	9	(0)
2013	Wigry Suwałki	7	(0)
2014–2017	Trakai	84	(16)
2018	Kauno Žalgiris	21	(0)
2019–2020	Arsenal Dzerzhinsk	26	(0)

International career
2004–2005	Russia U21	2	(1)
- * Club domestic league appearances and goals

Yuri Igorevich Mamaev (Russian: Юрий Игоревич Мамаев, born 3 February 1984) is a Russian former professional footballer who played as a midfielder.

== Career ==
Mamaev began playing in his home town Omsk, before moving to Germany to attend the football academy at VfB Stuttgart. After 5 years there he moved back to Russia to play with FC Shinnik Yaroslavl, before moving to FC Terek Grozny in 2008. He joined Chornomorets in September 2008 on a two-and-a-half-year contract.

In March 2012 Mamaev joined the Latvian Higher League club Daugava Daugavpils. He left in August 2012, without scoring goals in 16 matches. He then joined the Russian Second Division club FC Luch-Energiya Vladivostok.

In 2014 became the member of FK Trakai In this team he spend four seasons. In 2016 he made 25 assists for goal in season. in 2016 he had problems with injures and can't play as he could.

In 2018 he became member of FK Kauno Žalgiris.
