= Dapkus =

Dapkus is a surname. Notable people with the surname include:

- Eleanor Dapkus (1923–2011), American baseball player
- Martynas Dapkus (born 1993), Lithuanian footballer
