= Joshua Silva =

Portuguese footballer

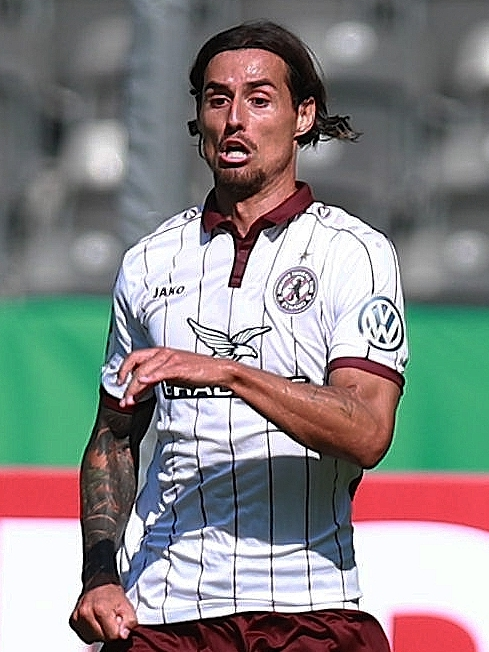
- Silva playing for BFC Dynamo in August 2018

Personal information
- Full name: Joshua Marques Pereira da Silva
- Date of birth: 21 August 1990 (age 36)
- Place of birth: Johannesburg, South Africa
- Height: 1.92 m (6 ft 4 in)
- Position: Centre back

Youth career
- 2000–2005: Internacional Almancil
- 2005–2007: Sporting CP
- 2007–2008: Louletano
- 2008–2009: Internacional Almancil

Senior career*
Years	Team	Apps	(Gls)
2009–2011	Olhanense	0	(0)
2009–2010	→ Quarteirense (loan)	16	(1)
2010–2011	→ Farense (loan)	28	(0)
2011–2012	Estrela Vendas Novas	15	(4)
2012	Torreense	8	(1)
2013	Anagennisi Epanomi	19	(3)
2013–2014	Farense	11	(0)
2014	Zawisza Bydgoszcz	2	(0)
2015	Bodø/Glimt	0	(0)
2015–2016	Viktoria 1889 Berlin	27	(1)
2016–2019	BFC Dynamo	37	(1)
2019–2021	Olhanense	26	(0)
2021	Dainava	12	(1)
2022	Louletano	2	(0)

International career
2011	Portugal U21	2	(0)
- * Club domestic league appearances and goals as of 23 August 2021

Joshua Marques Pereira da Silva (born 21 August 1990) is a Portuguese professional footballer who plays as a centre back.

== Club career ==
Born in Johannesburg, South Africa to Portuguese parents, Silva was a young Portuguese football talent with a lot of expectations for signing his first professional contract with 1st division S.C Olhanense at 17 years old. The first four years as a senior in the Portuguese 3rd and Second league, representing CDR Quarteirense, S.C. Farense, Estrela de Vendas Novas and S.C.U. Torreense all on loan from Portuguese 1st Division team S.C Olhanense. He was then called up for Portuguese National under 21 team in which they had a victory over Ireland and a draw against Denmark. In January 2013 he signed with 2nd Division Greek club Anagennisi Epanomi FC on a settled transfer fee, making his professional debut on the 27th by playing the full 90 minutes in a 2–0 away loss against Iraklis for the second level championship.

In the summer of 2014, after joining one season with former Second Division (Championship) side Farense, Silva was linked to 1st Division Portuguese team Braga but completed a move abroad again, joining 1st Division team Zawisza Bydgoszcz. Here he won his first trophy, the Polish Super Cup, and made his debut in the Europa league the same season against Zulte from Belgium.

Ahead of the 2015 season in Norway, Silva joined the Norwegian Premiership team Bodø/Glimt. Silva failed his medical examination when joining Bodø/Glimt and was sent back to Spain, though Bodø/Glimt changed their mind and signed him anyway before the transfer window closed. Silva needed time to reach match fitness and didn't get his opportunity. His only obligatory game for Bodø/Glimt was as a substitute in the 2nd round match against Mjølner in the Norwegian Cup. In August 2015 Silva and Bodø/Glimt agreed to terminate his contract so he could join Viktoria 1889 Berlin.

In July 2021 he signed with Lithuanian club DFK Dainava. He made his debut in A Lyga on 19 July 2021 against FK Riteriai and scored the first goal while Dainava won 2–1.

== International career ==
Silva gained two caps for the Portuguese under-21 team, his first coming on 25 March 2011 as he played the first half of a 2–0 friendly win over the Republic of Ireland.

== Personal life ==
Silva's younger brother, Matthew, is also a professional footballer.

== Honours ==
Zawisza Bydgoszcz

- Polish Super Cup: 2014
