= Matthew Silva =

Matthew Silva and similar may mean:

- Matthew Silva (coach) (born 1970), Welsh rugby union coach
- Matthew Silva (footballer), Portuguese footballer
- Matt Silva (soccer), a Canadian professional soccer player who plays as a goalkeeper
- Matt Silva, a ring name formally used by the Australian professional wrestler Buddy Matthews
