= Michael Kedman =

Footballer (born 1996)

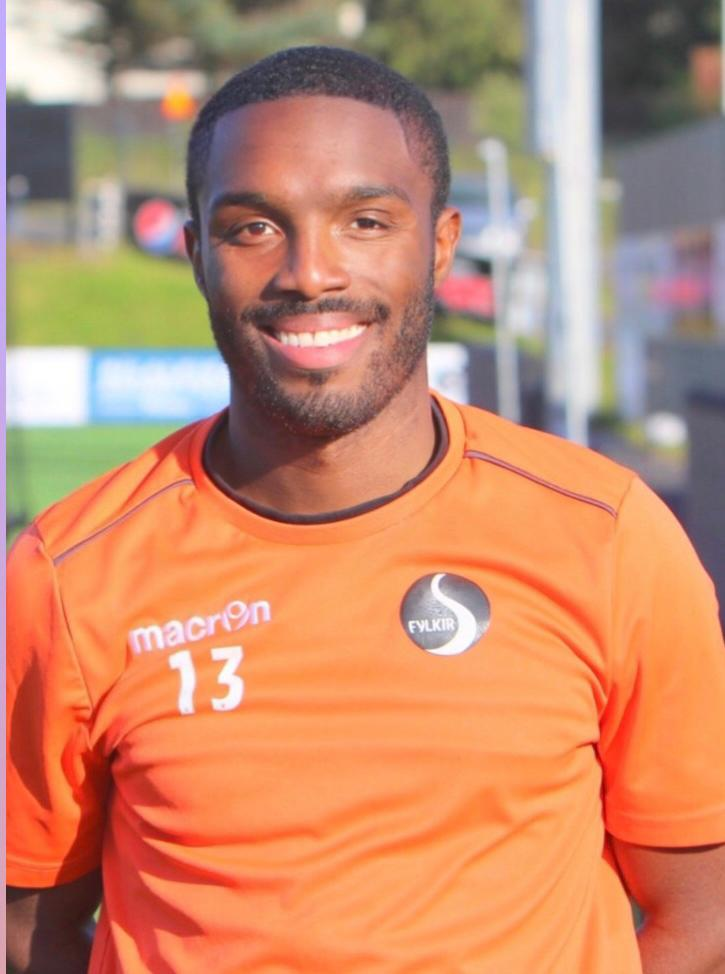

Personal information
- Full name: Michael Ashaki Kedman
- Date of birth: 16 December 1996 (age 29)
- Place of birth: London, England
- Height: 1.76 m (5 ft 9 in)
- Positions: Full-back; winger

Team information
- Current team: Maharlika

Youth career
- –2012: Chelsea
- 2012–2014: West Ham United
- 2014–2016: Sheffield United

Senior career*
Years	Team	Apps	(Gls)
2016	Maldon & Tiptree		
2016–2017	Edgware Town	4	(2)
2017–2018	Patro Eisden	9	(0)
2017	→ Central (loan)		
2018–2019	Tres Cantos	8	(0)
2019	Zakynthos		
2020	Fylkir	7	(0)
2021–2022	Dartford	3	(0)
2022	Þróttur Vogum	22	(0)
2023	AaB	0	(0)
2023	Havant & Waterlooville	2	(0)
2023–2024	Cheshunt	2	(0)
2024	Folkestone Invicta	17	(0)
2025	Connah's Quay Nomads	2	(0)
2025	Stallion Laguna	9	(3)
2026	Riteriai	5	(0)
2026–	Maharlika	0	(0)

International career^{‡}
2022	Trinidad and Tobago	1	(0)
- * Club domestic league appearances and goals as of 08:32, 29 May 2026 (UTC) ‡ National team caps and goals as of 14:52, 6 June 2022 (UTC)

Michael Kedman (born 16 December 1996) is a professional footballer who plays as a full-back or winger for Maharlika. Born in England, he represents the Trinidad and Tobago national team at international level.

== Club career ==
As a youngster, Kedman played for Chelsea, West Ham United and Sheffield United. Kedman then started his journey abroad playing in Belgium, Trinidad & Tobago and Spain. In October 2019, he joined Gamma Ethniki side Zakynthos. In August 2020, he joined Icelandic side Fylkir. The following year, he returned to England to join National League South side Dartford, making his debut in September 2021 in an FA Cup. In April 2022, he returned to Iceland to join newly promoted side Þróttur Vogum.

Following a short spell with AaB in Denmark, Kedman returned to England in October 2023 with National League South club Havant & Waterlooville.

In February 2024 he moved to Folkestone Invicta before joining Connah's Quay Nomads in January 2025 after training with the club the previous month.

On 14 September 2025, Kedman made his debut for Philippines Football League side Stallion Laguna.

On 15 March 2026, Kedman debuted for TOPLYGA side Riteriai, coming on as a second-half substitute in a defeat against Panevėžys.

On 26 August 2026, Kedman returned to the Philippines to sign for Maharlika.

== International career ==
On 4 June 2022, Kedman made his senior international debut for Trinidad and Tobago as a substitute in a 2–1 defeat to Nicaragua in a CONCACAF Nations League match.

== Writing career ==
Kedman released a book in March 2021 titled 'Failure is Success'.
