= Aldayr Hernández =

Colombian footballer (born 1995)

Personal information
- Full name: Aldayr Hernández Basanta
- Date of birth: 4 August 1995 (age 31)
- Place of birth: Magangué, Colombia
- Height: 1.85 m (6 ft 1 in)
- Position: Centre back

Team information
- Current team: Kauno Žalgiris
- Number: 23

Senior career*
| Years | Team | Apps | (Gls) |
| 2011–2017 | Bogotá | 141 | (0) |
| 2018 | Rocha | | |
| 2018–2019 | Bekaa | 10 | (0) |
| 2019–2020 | TPS | 46 | (2) |
| 2021 | HIFK | 26 | (2) |
| 2022–2023 | Honka | 55 | (4) |
| 2024– | Kauno Žalgiris | 90 | (2) |

International career
| 2015 | Colombia U20 | 1 | (0) |
| 2014 | Colombia U21 | 3 | (0) |
- * Club domestic league appearances and goals as of 14 September 2026

Aldayr Hernández Basanta (born 4 August 1995) is a Colombian professional footballer who plays as a defender for Toplyga club Kauno Žalgiris.

== Club career ==
In January 2021, he joined HIFK.

After spending a total of five years in Finland, Hernández moved to Lithuania and signed with Kauno Žalgiris on 27 December 2023.

== Career statistics ==
=== Club ===
As of 30 May 2024

Appearances and goals by club, season and competition
| Club | Season | League | | | National cup (Note: Includes Copa Colombia, Suomen Cup and Lithuanian Cup) | | Other | | Continental | | Total | |
| Club | Season | Division | Apps | Goals | Apps | Goals | Apps | Goals | Apps | Goals | Apps | Goals |
|---|---|---|---|---|---|---|---|---|---|---|---|---|
| Bogotá | 2011 | Categoría Primera B | 15 | 0 | 7 | 0 | — | | — | | 22 | 0 |
| Bogotá | 2012 | Categoría Primera B | 23 | 0 | 5 | 0 | — | | — | | 28 | 0 |
| Bogotá | 2013 | Categoría Primera B | 35 | 0 | 7 | 0 | — | | — | | 42 | 0 |
| Bogotá | 2014 | Categoría Primera B | 21 | 0 | 5 | 0 | — | | — | | 26 | 0 |
| Bogotá | 2015 | Categoría Primera B | 24 | 0 | 2 | 0 | — | | — | | 26 | 0 |
| Bogotá | 2016 | Categoría Primera B | 23 | 0 | 4 | 0 | — | | — | | 27 | 0 |
| Bogotá | Total | | 141 | 0 | 30 | 0 | 0 | 0 | 0 | 0 | 171 | 0 |
| Bekaa | 2018–19 | Lebanese Premier League | 10 | 0 | — | | — | | — | | 10 | 0 |
| TPS | 2019 | Ykkönen | 25 | 0 | 0 | 0 | 2 (Note: Appearances in the Promotion/relegation play-offs) | 0 | — | | 27 | 0 |
| TPS | 2020 | Veikkausliiga | 21 | 2 | 6 | 0 | 2 (Note: Appearances in the Relegation play-offs) | 0 | — | | 29 | 2 |
| TPS | Total | | 46 | 2 | 6 | 0 | 4 | 0 | 0 | 0 | 56 | 2 |
| HIFK | 2021 | Veikkausliiga | 26 | 2 | 5 | 0 | — | | — | | 31 | 2 |
| Honka | 2022 | Veikkausliiga | 27 | 3 | 0 | 0 | 3 (Note: Appearances in the Finnish League Cup) | 0 | — | | 30 | 3 |
| Honka | 2023 | Veikkausliiga | 28 | 1 | 5 | 1 | 5 | 0 | 2 (Note: Appearances in the UEFA Europa Conference League) | 0 | 40 | 2 |
| Honka | Total | | 55 | 4 | 5 | 1 | 8 | 0 | 2 | 0 | 70 | 5 |
| Kauno Žalgiris | 2024 | A Lyga | 15 | 0 | 2 | 0 | — | | — | | 17 | 0 |
| Career total | | | 293 | 8 | 48 | 1 | 12 | 0 | 2 | 0 | 355 | 9 |

== Honours ==
Kauno Žalgiris

- Toplyga: 2025, 2026
- Lithuanian Cup: 2026
- Lithuanian Supercup: 2026
