= Glenn Ståhl =

Swedish footballer and manager

Personal information
- Full name: Glenn Leif Ståhl
- Date of birth: 25 August 1971 (age 55)
- Place of birth: Värnamo, Sweden
- Height: 1.79 m (5 ft 10 in)
- Position: Defender

Youth career
- IFK Värnamo

Senior career*
| Years | Team | Apps | (Gls) |
| 1988–1992 | IFK Värnamo | | |
| 1993 | Östers IF | | |
| 1994 | IFK Värnamo | | |
| 1996–2000 | Husqvarna FF | 150 | (30) |
| 2001–2005 | HamKam | 125 | (4) |
| 2006 | Husqvarna FF | | |

International career
| 1987–1988 | Sweden U17 | 22 | (0) |
| 1989–1991 | Sweden U19 | 21 | (0) |

Managerial career
- 2007–2010: Husqvarna FF
- 2011–2012: IFK Värnamo
- 2013–2014: GIF Sundsvall (analyst)
- 2015–2016: Kvik Halden
- 2017: Ljungskile SK
- 2018: TB/FC Suðuroy/Royn
- 2020: NSÍ Runavík
- 2021: KÍ Klaksvík (academy director)
- 2022: FK Riteriai
- 2022–2023: Al-Bukiryah
- 2023–2024: FK Kauno Žalgiris
- * Club domestic league appearances and goals

Glenn Leif Ståhl (born 25 August 1971) is a Swedish football manager and former player who is currently the manager for Lithuanian A Lyga club FK Kauno Žalgiris. During his career as a footballer, he played as a defender for Östers IF and Husqvarna FF in Sweden, and HamKam in Norway. 1991 he played U20 World Cup in Portugal. He holds UEFA Pro License since 2012.

== Playing career ==
Ståhl joined HamKam from Husqvarna FF ahead of the 2001 season, after being wanted by the Norwegian club since 1999. In his first season 2001, he was elected "Player of the Year" by HamKam's supporters and he got the same award after 2003 season. He played a total of 125 matches and scored four goals for the club, before he returned to Husqvarna FF after the 2005 season.

== Managerial career ==
After being in charge of Husqvarna FF for four seasons, the Norwegian Third Division club Moelven IL announced on 14 December 2010 that they had hired Ståhl as their managers on a three-year deal. But his return to Hedmark in Norway never happened as he withdrew from the contract two weeks later.

From January 2011 to the summer 2012, Ståhl was the manager of IFK Värnamo. Ståhl was hired as scout for IFK Värnamo in the summer 2012. In the 2011 season as a newcomer and the first time in Superettan they managed to pick respectable 39 points. During the 2013–14 season he worked as a scout for GIF Sundsvall.

From January 2015 to December 2016, Ståhl was in the charge of Norwegian club Kvik Halden. During 2015 they had huge success in the Norwegian cup after beaten both Fredrikstad FK and Strömsgodset but lost against Molde FK in round of 16. This was the best cup result in 80 years. During 2015 Kvik Halden won 14 out of 15 home games and amassed a club record of 53 points in the league campaign, 22 more than the previous season, They ended at third place in the league.

Ljungskile SK appointed Ståhl as new manager for the 2017 season.

In 2018 he coached TB/FC Suðuroy/Royn in the Faroe Islands Premier League and had huge success with a 7th place in the league and semi-final in the cup, both record for the club.

In 2019 he held a consultation role with Swedish FA to identify potential youth national team players born in 2004.

For the 2020 season he signed with Faroese club NSÍ Runavík FC. The year in NSÍ Runavík FC was a success, such as a historical win when the club reached the first round in the UEFA Europa League for the first time in its history. Another club record and best result ever was that they only conceded 16 goals in 21 games (0,76) per game. NSI Runavik FC achieved 2,24 points per game, a record for any coach in the club's history. In 2021 he was appointed as academy director in KÍ Klaksvík.

In 2022 he worked as the head coach of a Lithuanian club FK Riteriai between January and May. On 5 December 2023, Ståhl signed with FK Kauno Žalgiris of the Lithuanian A Lyga.
