= Rokas Lekiatas =

Lithuanian footballer (born 1998)

Personal information
- Date of birth: 7 November 1998 (age 28)
- Place of birth: Šiauliai, Lithuania
- Height: 1.85 m (6 ft 1 in)
- Position: Defender

Team information
- Current team: Kauno Žalgiris
- Number: 77

Youth career
- –2015: Šiauliai
- 2017: ADM Lorquí

Senior career*
Years	Team	Apps	(Gls)
2015	Šiauliai	5	(0)
2016	Džiugas Telšiai	12	(0)
2017	Sūduva B		
2018	Pakruojis	14	(0)
2019–2023	Šiauliai	122	(5)
2024	Panevėžys	0	(0)
2024–2025	U Craiova	22	(0)
2025–	Kauno Žalgiris	30	(2)

International career^{‡}
- Lithuania U17
- Lithuania U19
2023–	Lithuania	18	(0)
- * Club domestic league appearances and goals as of 14 September 2026 ‡ National team caps and goals as of 18 November 2026

Rokas Lekiatas (born 7 November 1998) is a Lithuanian professional footballer who plays as a centre-back for Toplyga club Kauno Žalgiris and the Lithuania national team.

Born in Šiauliai, he made his A Lyga debut for FC Šiauliai. He also had a short stint with youth football in Spain, and played for Lithuanian youth national teams.

In 2019, he joined FA Šiauliai. He spent some years in the second tier, before managing to return to the A Lyga in 2022. His best season in the club was regarded as 2023, when he served as team captain and the team finished third in the 2023 A Lyga. He was also called up to represent Lithuania for the first time. After the season was over, Lekiatas was announced as a new signing for league champions FK Panevėžys. However, there was a clause that he was allowed to leave in February 2024, should a foreign club make an offer.

Having only played one friendly match for Panevėžys, it was announced in January 2024 that the clause was activated and that Lekiatas would move abroad. He joined FC U Craiova 1948 of the Romanian I Liga. He made his debut in February 2024, as a starter. After the team was relegated from the 2023–24 Liga I and failed to win promotion from the 2024–25 Liga II, Lekiatas was released in April 2025.

== Honours ==
Kauno Žalgiris

- Toplyga: 2025, 2026
- Lithuanian Cup: 2026
