= Rokas Stanulevičius =

Lithuanian footballer

Personal information
- Date of birth: 2 October 1994 (age 32)
- Place of birth: Biržai, Lithuania
- Position: Midfielder

Team information
- Current team: Be1

Senior career*
Years	Team	Apps	(Gls)
2011–2014	Ekranas	36	(2)
2015	Trakai	25	(2)
2016–2017	Ironi Kiryat Shmona	6	(0)
2016–2017	→ Hapoel Nazareth Illit	34	(3)
2019	Panevėžys	15	(0)
2020–2021	Džiugas Telšiai	35	(4)
2022	Panevėžys	25	(3)
2023	CSM Focșani		
2023	Cork City	5	(0)
2024	Dainava	22	(0)
2025–2026	Riteriai	27	(2)
2026–	Be1	0	(0)

International career
2015–2017	Lithuania U21	4	(1)
- * Club domestic league appearances and goals as of 8 March 2026

Rokas Stanulevičius (born 2 October 1994, in Lithuania) is a Lithuanian professional footballer who plays as a midfielder for I Lyga club Be1.

== Career ==
He started to play football in his native town Biržai and later removed to Panevėžys.

He spent a few seasons at FK Ekranas. Played in FK Riteriai and was sold to Israel. He returned back to Lithuania joining Džiugas Club.

In January 2022, he signed with FK Panevėžys. In July 2023, he signed for League of Ireland Premier Division club Cork City.

On 18 February 2025 announced that Stanulevičius transferred into Riteriai Club.
