= SFL Cup (Lithuania) =

- Founded: 2005
- Region: Lithuania

The Sunday Football League Cup or the SFL Cup for abbreviation, is an association football cup competition held for clubs in the Sunday Football League in Lithuania. It is a knock-out competition with the final no replays, meaning each match will end with a winner and uses the penalty shootout.
