= Vladimir Janković =

Vladimir Janković may refer to:

- Vladimir Velmar-Janković (1895–1976), Serbian writer
- Vlado Janković, Serbian-born Greek professional basketball player, known in Greece as Vladimiros "Vlanto" Giankovits
- Vladimir Janković (football), Serbian football (soccer) manager and former player
