= Martynas Dapkus =

Lithuanian footballer

Personal information
- Date of birth: 16 February 1993 (age 33)
- Place of birth: Tauragė, Lithuania
- Height: 1.86 m (6 ft 1 in)
- Position: Defender

Team information
- Current team: FA Šiauliai
- Number: 44

Youth career
- 2010–2011: Atletas Kaunas
- 2011–2012: Maccabi Haifa

Senior career*
| Years | Team | Apps | (Gls) |
| 2012–2015 | Maccabi Haifa | 0 | (0) |
| 2012–2015 | → Hapoel Nazareth Illit (loan) | 41 | (1) |
| 2015 | Stumbras | 29 | (2) |
| 2016 | Trakai | 10 | (1) |
| 2017 | Šilas | 0 | (0) |
| 2017–2018 | Jonava | 51 | (1) |
| 2019–2023 | Kauno Žalgiris | 134 | (5) |
| 2024– | FA Šiauliai | 49 | (3) |

International career^{‡}
| 2011–2016 | Lithuania U-21 | 16 | (1) |
| 2013–2021 | Lithuania | 16 | (0) |
- * Club domestic league appearances and goals as of 10 November 2025 ‡ National team caps and goals as of 1 May 2025

Martynas Dapkus (born 16 February 1993) is a Lithuanian footballer currently playing at FA Šiauliai in Lithuania's A Lyga.

== Career ==
Dapkus is a graduate of the NFA. In 2011 moved to the youth system of FK Atletas Kaunas, and in summer 2011 moved to Maccabi Haifa after the recommendation of former player Raimondas Žutautas bring the player. After one season in the youth loaned to Hapoel Nazareth Illit. For the 2015 season he returned to Lithuania and signed with FC Stumbras, a team with close relations to NFA where he graduated. Before 2016 season, Dapkus moved into Lithuanian vice-champions Trakai, but was released after club lost in Europa League qualification. He agreed to one-year deal with I Lyga winners Šilas before 2017 season, but had to leave the club as it withdrew from the professional football due to match-fixing allegations. Midfielder joined other A Lyga club Jonava.

In January 2019 he joined FK Kauno Žalgiris.
