= Juhani Pikkarainen =

Finnish footballer (born 1998)

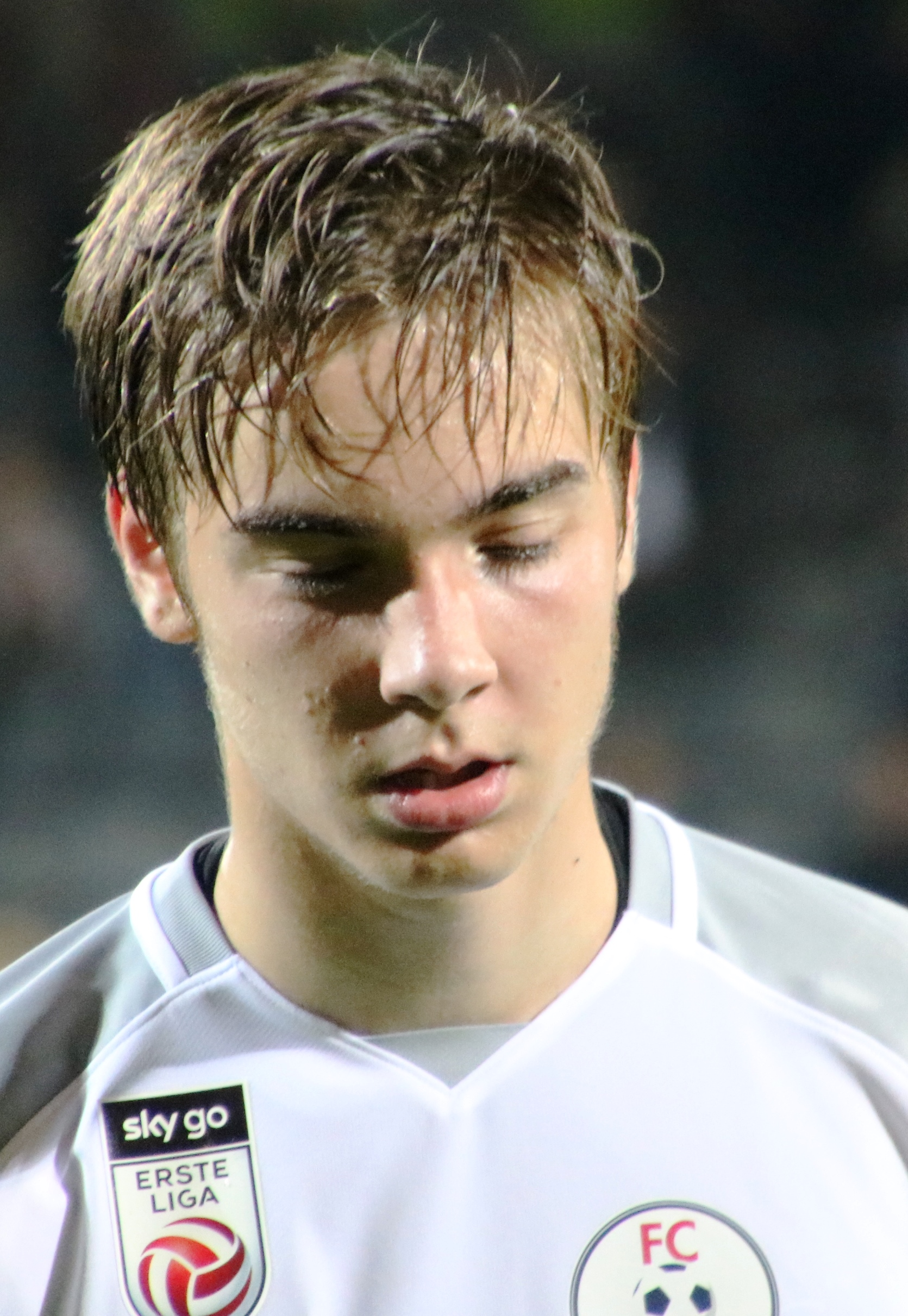
- Pikkarainen with Liefering in 2017

Personal information
- Full name: Juhani Elias Pikkarainen
- Date of birth: 30 July 1998 (age 28)
- Place of birth: Paimio, Finland
- Height: 1.95 m (6 ft 5 in)
- Position: Centre back

Team information
- Current team: Degerfors
- Number: 5

Youth career
- –2015: TPS
- 2015–2016: Red Bull Salzburg

Senior career*
Years	Team	Apps	(Gls)
2016–2018	Liefering	1	(0)
2016–2017	→ Anif (loan)	23	(1)
2018	→ Blau-Weiß Linz (loan)	11	(0)
2018	Wacker Innsbruck II	1	(0)
2019	KPV	15	(0)
2020–2021	TPS	34	(1)
2022–2023	VPS	52	(2)
2024	Ilves	25	(0)
2025–	Degerfors	29	(2)

International career^{‡}
2016	Finland U18	3	(0)
2016–2017	Finland U19	5	(0)
2017–2019	Finland U21	8	(1)
2024–	Finland	1	(0)
- * Club domestic league appearances and goals as of 8 July 2026 ‡ National team caps and goals as of 17 November 2024

Juhani Elias Pikkarainen (born 30 July 1998) is a Finnish professional footballer who plays as a defender for Allsvenskan club Degerfors and the Finland national team.

== Club career ==
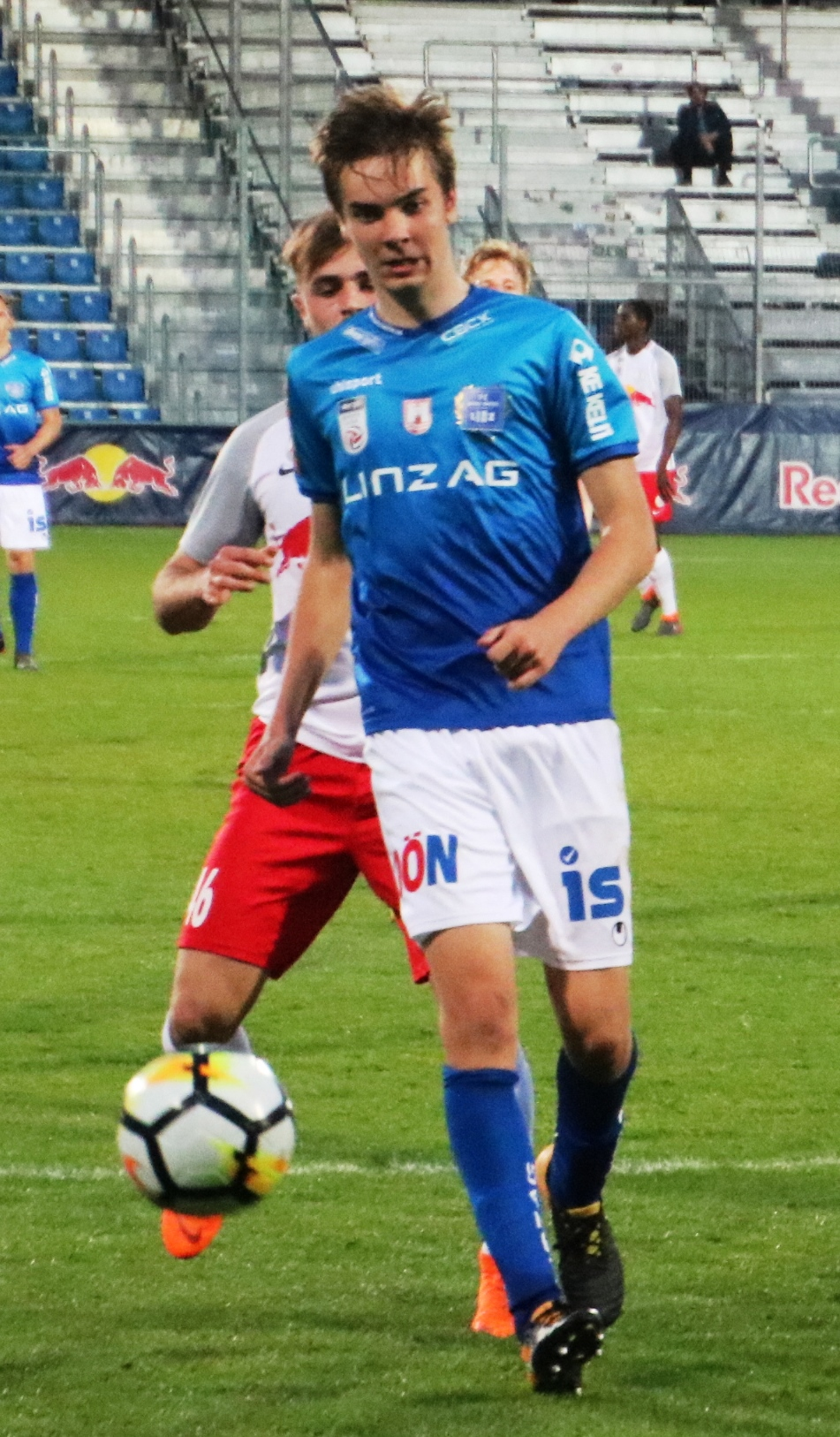
Pikkarainen with Blau-Weiß Linz in 2018

Pikkarainen started playing in Turun Palloseura (TPS), before he signed with RB Salzburg youth academy in 2015.

Pikkarainen spent three years in Austria, before he returned to Finland and signed with newly promoted Veikkausliiga club Kokkolan Palloveikot (KPV) on 11 December 2018 until 2019, with an option to extend the deal until 2020. KPV were relegated back, and he then returned to his former club TPS for the 2020 season, signing a deal until the end of 2021.

On 17 November 2021, he signed a contract with Vaasan Palloseura (VPS) for the 2022 season. On 9 September 2022, his contract with VPS was extended for the 2023 season. Pikkarainen helped VPS to finish 3rd in the league and qualify for the UEFA Conference League qualifiers. He was named in the league's Team of the Season in 2023.

On 6 November 2023, it was announced that Pikkarainen had signed with Veikkausliiga club Ilves on a two-year deal, starting in 2024. He helped Ilves to finish as the runners-up in the league. Pikkarainen was named in the Veikkausliiga Team of the Season again in 2024.

On 5 January 2025, Pikkarainen signed with Allsvenskan club Degerfors IF until the end of 2027 for an undisclosed fee. Per the reports in media, the fee was in the region of €200,000–300,000.

== International career ==
Pikkarainen is a former youth international for Finland.

On 2 October 2024, Pikkarainen received his first call-up to the Finland senior national team by the head coach Markku Kanerva, for the 2024–25 UEFA Nations League B matches against Ireland and England. He made his debut on 17 November 2024 in a Nations League game against Greece at the Helsinki Olympic Stadium. He started the game and played 67 minutes, as Greece won 2–0.

== Personal life ==
His father Tommi Pikkarainen is a Finnish football manager and a former player.

== Career statistics ==
=== Club ===
As of 15 May 2025

Appearances and goals by club, season and competition
Club	Season	League			Cup (Note: Includes Austrian Cup and Suomen Cup)		League cup (Note: Includes Finnish League Cup)		Europe		Total	
Club	Season	Division	Apps	Goals	Apps	Goals	Apps	Goals	Apps	Goals	Apps	Goals
Liefering	2016–17	Austrian 2. Liga	0	0	0	0	–		–		0	0
Liefering	2017–18	Austrian 2. Liga	1	0	0	0	–		–		1	0
Liefering	Total		1	0	0	0	–	–	–	–	1	0
Anif (loan)	2016–17	Austrian Regionalliga West	23	1	1	0	–		–		24	1
Blau-Weiß Linz (loan)	2017–18	Austrian 2. Liga	11	0	0	0	–		–		11	0
Wacker Innsbruck II	2018–19	Austrian 2. Liga	1	0	0	0	–		–		1	0
KPV Akatemia	2019	Kolmonen	3	0	–		–		–		3	0
KPV	2019	Veikkausliiga	15	0	7	0	–		–		22	0
TPS	2020	Veikkausliiga	10	1	7	0	–		–		17	1
TPS	2021	Ykkönen	24	0	2	0	–		–		26	0
TPS	Total		34	1	9	0	–	–	–	–	43	1
VPS	2022	Veikkausliiga	25	2	4	1	2	0	–		31	3
VPS	2023	Veikkausliiga	27	0	2	1	3	1	–		32	2
VPS	Total		52	2	6	2	5	1	–	–	63	5
Ilves	2024	Veikkausliiga	25	0	1	0	5	0	4 (Note: Includes UEFA Conference League)	0	35	0
Degerfors	2025	Allsvenskan	7	1	0	0	–		–		7	1
Career total			172	5	24	2	10	1	4	0	210	8

=== International ===
As of 17 November 2024

Appearances and goals by national team and year
National team	Year	Apps	Goals
Finland	2024	1	0
Total		1	0

== Honours ==
VPS

- Veikkausliiga: 2023 3rd place

Ilves

- Veikkausliiga runner-up: 2024

Individual

- Veikkausliiga Team of the Year: 2023, 2024
- Veikkausliiga Defender of the Year: 2024
