= Tommi Pikkarainen =

Finnish footballer and manager (born 1969)

Personal information
- Date of birth: 6 December 1969 (age 56)
- Place of birth: Kokkola, Finland
- Position: Defender

Team information
- Current team: VPS (sporting director)

Senior career*
Years	Team	Apps	(Gls)
1987–1990	KPV	58	(0)
1991	PPT	23	(0)
1992	Husqvarna		
1994	Pallo-Iirot	22	(4)
1996–1998	Sporting Kristina	58	(12)
1999	VG-62	9	(0)

Managerial career
- 2000: Inter Turku (assistant)
- 2002–2004: Pargas IF
- 2005–2006: SalPa
- 2008–2009: Jaro (assistant)
- 2010–2011: VPS
- 2017–2018: SalPa
- 2018–2020: TPS
- 2020: Riteriai
- 2022–2024: Jazz (sporting director)
- 2024–: VPS (sporting director)
- * Club domestic league appearances and goals

Tommi Pikkarainen (born 6 December 1969) is a Finnish football manager and former player, currently working as a sporting director of Vaasan Palloseura (VPS) in Veikkausliiga.

== Playing career ==
As a player, Pikkarainen played as a centre back for KPV and Porin Pallo-Toverit in Veikkausliiga, and for KPV and Pallo-Iirot in second-tier Ykkönen. He also played for Husqvarna FF in Swedish second division. His professional playing career was limited due to knee injury when aged 24. Later he played also for Sporting Kristina and VG-62 in lower divisions in the Finnish football league system and also coached for the clubs.

== Coaching career ==
Pikkarainen has coached Pargas IF, SalPa, and Vaasan Palloseura (VPS) and Turun Palloseura (TPS) in Finnish Veikkausliiga, and Riteriai in Lithuanian A Lyga in 2020. He has also worked previously as an assistant coach for Inter Turku and Jaro, and as a U19 youth coach for TPS between 2012 and 2015.

Since March 2022, he served as a sporting director of FC Jazz, having previously played for the club when it was named Porin Pallo-Toverit in 1991. On 13 February 2024, it was announced that Pikkarainen will leave the club in the end of March as his two-year deal expires. Later he stated that the reason for leaving was the inequality and negligence in the city of Pori between different sports.

On 21 October 2024, Veikkausliiga club VPS announced the appointment of Pikkarainen as the club's new sporting director after the departure of Petri Vuorinen, starting after the ongoing season. Pikkarainen would make a return to the club after having served as VPS head coach in Veikkausliiga in 2010–2011.

== Personal life ==
His son Juhani Pikkarainen is a professional footballer and Finland international.

== Coaching record ==
As of 9 July 2023

Team	Nat	From	To	Record				
Team	Nat	From	To	G	W	D	L	Win %
SalPa	(Finland)	1 January 2018	31 December 2018	22	13	4	5	59.09
TPS	(Finland)	1 January 2019	23 July 2020	44	21	10	13	47.73
Riteriai	(Lithuania)	11 August 2020	31 December 2020	8	2	2	4	25.00
Total				74	36	16	22	48.65
