= Albert Rybak =

Belarusian football manager

Personal information
- Full name: Albert Vladimirovich Rybak
- Date of birth: 16 May 1973 (age 53)
- Place of birth: Grodno, Byelorussian SSR, Soviet Union
- Height: 1.87 m (6 ft 2 in)
- Position: Goalkeeper

Team information
- Current team: Naftan-2 Novopolotsk (assistant coach)

Youth career
- SDYuShOR-6 Grodno

Senior career*
Years	Team	Apps	(Gls)
1991	Veras Grodno		
1991–2003	Neman Grodno	189	(0)
1993–1995	→ Avtoprovod Schuchin		
1996–1999	→ Neman-2 Grodno	6	(0)
2004	Slavia Mozyr	5	(0)

Managerial career
- 2006–2007: Neman Grodno (goalkeeper coach)
- 2008–2009: MTZ-RIPO Minsk (goalkeeper coach)
- 2010: Dinamo Brest (goalkeeper coach)
- 2013–2014: Smolevichi-STI
- 2016–2019: Trakai / Riteriai (goalkeeper coach)
- 2016: Trakai (caretaker)
- 2018: Trakai (caretaker)
- 2019: Riteriai (caretaker)
- 2021–2023: Belshina Bobruisk
- 2023–2024: Naftan Novopolotsk
- 2024–: Naftan-2 Novopolotsk (assistant)
- * Club domestic league appearances and goals

Albert Vladimirovich Rybak (Belarusian: Альберт Рыбак, Russian: Альберт Рыбак; born 16 May 1973) is a Belarusian football manager and former player.

== Career ==
In 1991, at the age of 17, Rybak was playing in the Soviet third division with Neman Grodno. For 2004, he signed for Slavia Mozyr after spending the previous 15 years with Neman Grodno. During his time there, Rybak sustained a ruptured ligament which caused him to retire.

Despite joining FK Riteriai in Lithuania as a goalkeeper coach, he was appointed interim head coach on three successive occasions (2016 to 2019), helping the club reach third place two consecutive seasons and earning the November 2019 Coach of the Month award.

== Honours ==
Neman Grodno

- Belarusian Cup winner: 1992–93
