= Kauno Žalgiris FA Stadium =

Football stadium located in Kaunas, Lithuania

FK Kauno Žalgiris Football Academy Stadium
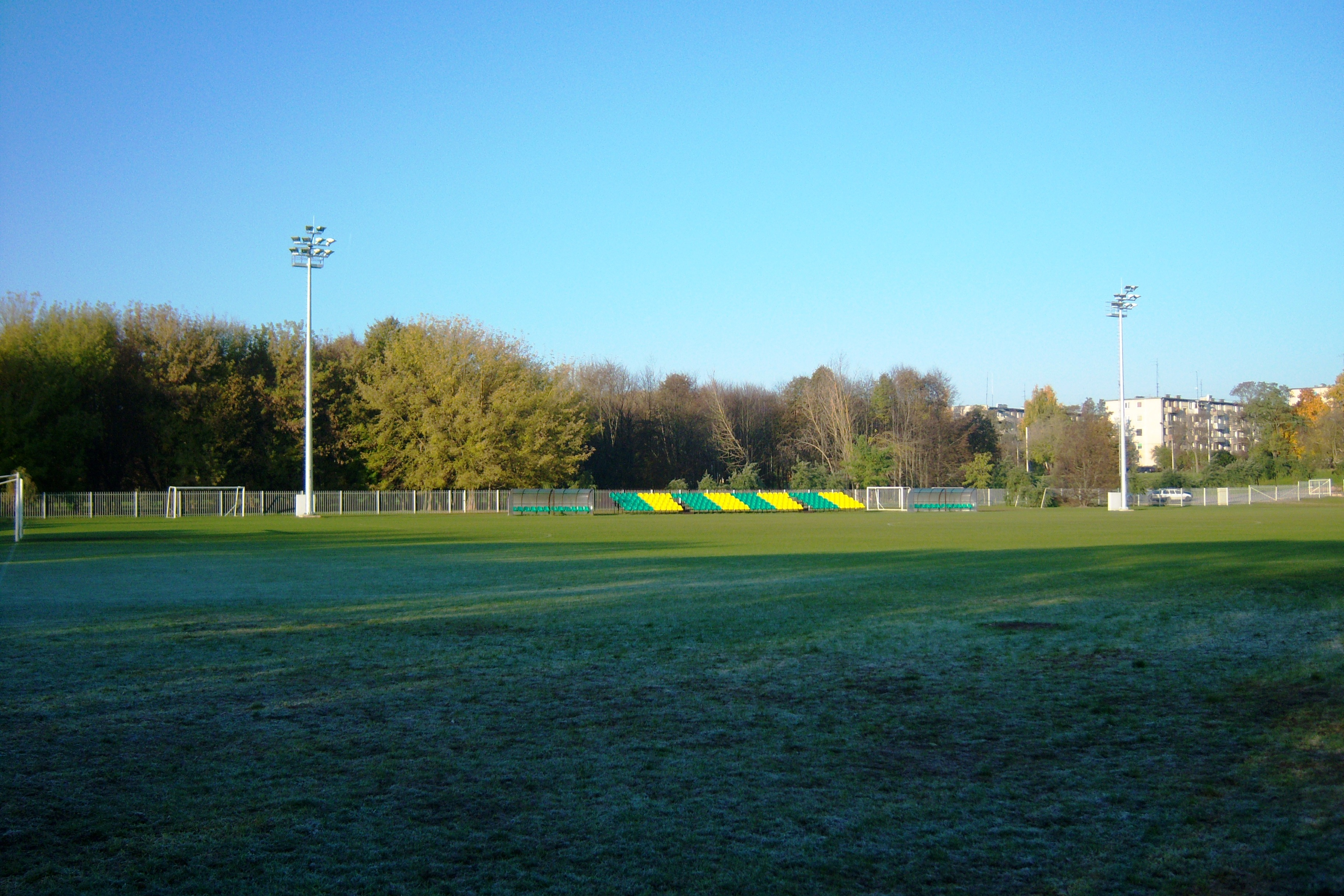
- Interactive map of FK Kauno Žalgiris Football Academy Stadium
- Former names: Kaunas Football School Stadium; SM Tauras Stadium
- Address: Neries Krantinė, 7B
- Location: Kaunas, Lithuania
- Coordinates: 54°54′36″N 23°53′57″E
- Owner: FK Kauno Žalgiris
- Operator: FK Kauno Žalgiris
- Capacity: 500
- Surface: Grass
- Field size: 105 m × 68 m (344 ft × 223 ft)

Tenant
- FK Kauno Žalgiris

FK Kauno Žalgiris Football Academy Stadium, formerly known as Kaunas Football School Stadium and Sports School Tauras Stadium, is a football stadium located in Kaunas, Lithuania, and is the temporary home of A Lyga club FK Kauno Žalgiris. The stadium has a current capacity of 500 spectators.

== Usage ==
Stadium is owned and operated by FK Kauno Žalgiris, who took over the previous owner - Sports School SM Tauras in 2020. Throughout the years it was used by various local amateur clubs playing in the II Lyga and lower divisions, including FBK Kaunas and Kauno Žalgiris.

Kauno Žalgiris have returned to the stadium in 2019 due to ongoing reconstruction of the Darius and Girėnas Stadium.

== Facilities ==
In 2016, it was decided to install an air-supported structure over the 2nd pitch of the complex. The plan was officially canceled in 2019.
