= Pablo Villar =

Spanish football manager

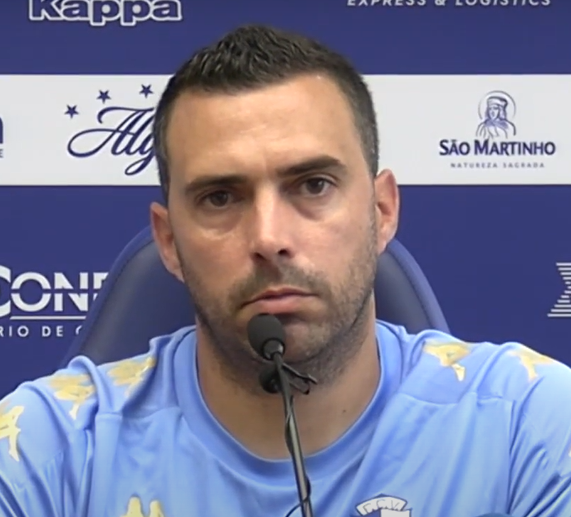
- Villar in 2023

Personal information
- Full name: Pablo Villar Ferreiro
- Date of birth: 4 September 1986 (age 40)
- Place of birth: Avilés, Spain
- Height: 1.86 m (6 ft 1 in)
- Position: Goalkeeper

Pablo Villar Ferreiro (born 4 September 1986) is a Spanish football Uefa Pro Coach and former player who played as a goalkeeper. Currently he is working in Saudi Arabia as the Head Coach of the U-21 Al-Najmah SC (Jawwy Elite League U-21).

== Playing career ==
Born in Avilés, Asturias, Villar , Real Avilés CF and Pontevedra CF as a youth. He made his senior debut with Tercera División side Villalonga FC in 2006, and later represented Arosa SC before returning to his home region in 2007.

Villar signed for CD Cudillero in the third tier on 15 August 2007. He moved to fellow league team SD Compostela on 11 July 2008.

On 14 July 2009, Villar returned to Avilés, now for the first team also in the third division. He returned to Compos in July 2010, but left the club in November due to their financial problems, and trained with Marino before signing for Ribadesella CF on 1 February 2011.

== Managerial career ==
In 2011, he was appointed manager of AD Ribadedeva in the Primera Regional de Asturias.

In June 2012, Villar became Fabri González's assistant at Segunda División side SD Huesca. On 25 June 2013, he returned to managerial duties, being named at the helm of Luarca CF in the third tier. He left the club in the following May, and was appointed CD Tineo manager on 22 May 2014.

Villar led Tineo to a first-ever promotion the third tier in his first season, and left the club in 2016, after avoiding relegation.

On 2016, Villar was named manager of Urraca CF, still in division three. He left the club the following 14 February, after being hired by the Chinese Ministry of Education to work in Tianjin.

Villar returned to Spain in December 2017, joining Fabri's staff as first assistant coach at Lorca FC in the spanish second division. He followed the manager to FC Karpaty Lviv in the Premier League of Ukraine before being named assistant at Qingdao Hainiu FC on 20 December 2019.

In October 2021, Villar became the first Spaniard to manage in the Slovak Super Liga, after being appointed in charge of FK Pohronie. He took over FK Riteriai in Lithuania's A Lyga on 24 May 2022. In his first season, the team almost qualified to the European Competition.

On 2 June 2023, Villar signed a one-year contract at F.C. Vizela of the Portuguese Primeira Liga, succeeding Tulipa. On 18 December 2023, Villar reached an agreement with the board of Vizela to stop their contract for being appointed as manager of Chinese Super League club Meizhou Hakka. He won the "42nd Guandong-Hong Kong Cup" in February 2024.

Since August 2025 he is working in Saudi Arabia, as the Head Coach of the U-21 Al-Najmah SC (Jawwy Elite League U-21).

== Clubs ==
=== Head coach ===
Club	País	Año
SD Huesca (assistant coach)	Spain	2012–2013
Luarca CF	Spain	2013–2014
Club Deportivo Tineo	Spain	2014–2016
Urraca Club de Fútbol	Spain	2016–2017
Lorca FC (assistant coach)	Spain	2017–2018
Karpaty Lviv (assistant coach)	Ukraine	2018–2019
Qingdao Jonoon (assistant coach)	China	2019–2020
FK Pohronie	Slovakia	2021–2021
FK Riteriai	Lithuania	2022–2023
Vizela	Portugal	2023
Meizhou Hakka	China	2024
