= Sunday Football League (Lithuania) =

Amateur association football level 5 league in Lithuania

Sunday Football League (SFL)
- Founded: 2005
- Folded: 2021
- Country: Lithuania
- Confederation: UEFA
- Divisions: A, B, C, D (vertical divisions)
- Number of clubs: 44 (2020)
- Level on pyramid: 5
- Promotion to: III Lyga (subject to licensing criteria)
- Relegation to: none
- Last champions: FK Ave.Ko. (2019)

The Sunday Football League, SFL (lith: Sekmadienio Futbolo Lyga) is an amateur association football level 5 league in Lithuania. The league was established in 2005. It is managed by an organization VšĮ "Sekmadienio futbolo lyga“, run by Vilnius District Football Union (VRFS), independently from the Lithuanian Football Federation. Players from all other leagues except the top Lithuanian division A Lyga are allowed to play in the SFL as well as their respective league clubs. All games take place on Sundays, unlimited substitutions are allowed.

The SFL also organizes an annual Sunday Football League Cup competition.

== History ==
The league was established in 2005 in Vilnius. In the first season 19 teams participated in the SFL (A division - 9 teams, B division - 6, C division 4). 2006 SFL season consisted of 24 teams (A division - 8, B division - 8, C division - 8) In 2007 SFL expanded to 37 teams, divided into 4 divisions (A division - 10, B division - 10, C division - 10, D1 division 7 (spring), and 9 (autumn). 2008 SFL season saw 48 teams participating in Vilnius region (A division - 10, B division - 10, C division - 10, D 1 division - 9, D 2 division - 9), and 5 teams in Klaipėda County.

2009 SFL season got the hype of SFL with 60 teams and 2500 players participating in Vilnius SFL alone. The SFL league has also spread beyond Vilnius region to Klaipėda, Alytus and Šakiai. Among the SFL participants were former professional footballers Raimondas Žutautas, Vaidas Žutautas, Eimantas Poderis, Ričardas Zdančius, Aidas Preikšaitis and some celebrities such as former professional basketball player Rolandas Skaisgirys, singers Gabrielius Liaudanskas-Svaras and Linas Zareckas-Choras, actor Andrius Bialobžeskis, politician Juozas Olekas. Fifteen SFL teams participated in 2009/2010 LFF Cup competition. In 2010 Šakiai division dissolved, however in 2011 Sūduva and Aukštaitija divisions have joined in.

In 2012 the SFL was restructured, the divisions were matched to County Football Federation boundaries. SFL competitions took place in Vilnius, Kaunas, Klaipėda, Šiauliai, Panevėžys, Marijampolė and Alytus counties until 2015.

In 2016 all SFL leagues have dissolved except for Vilnius region. In Vilnius, depending on number of participants, competition takes place in 3 or 4 divisions.

== Teams ==
44 teams have signed up to participate in the 2020 SFL competition. On 12 March 2020 the season was postponed due to the COVID-19 pandemic.

SFL A	SFL B	SFL C	SFL D
FC Kaišiadorys-Baltai (↓); FK Ave.Ko. (-4 tšk.); Top Kickers; FK Širvintos-VGTU; FK TEC; Futbolo Broliai; Salininkai; Mostiškės; Granitas B (↑); Navigatoriai Old Boys (↑); Geležinis Vilkas (↑); Viltis	Viesulas (↓); Katastrofa; Euforija; Granitas Senjorai; Futboliukas; Tėvynės Sąjunga; Skaidiškės; Gariūnai (↑); FK Medžiai 2 (↑); PILK (↑); Vieni Vartai (↑); Visinčia (↑)	Ozo Tapyrai (↓); Trivartis (↓); FK Viesulas 2; Vova Juniors; Olandai; Modulis; Pressas; Nemenčinė; FK Ave.Ko. B; Reaktyvas	Lentvaris B (↓); Molėtai (↓); Top Kickers-Koloro (↓); Arpas (↓); Imperialas (↓); A komanda - Margiris B (N); Spartakas B (N); Elektrėnų Versmė B (N); ADS Auto (N); Anykščiai (N)
