= III Lyga =

LFF III Lyga
- Country: Lithuania
- Divisions: 5
- Number of clubs: various
- Level on pyramid: 4
- Promotion to: II Lyga
- Relegation to: Sunday Football League

Lithuanian Football Federation's III league, LFF III lyga, is the fourth tier Lithuanian football championship.

== Members ==
The league consists of leagues organized by County Football Federations in each of the 10 Counties of Lithuania. Due to low participant numbers some counties do not run III lyga competitions.

- Vilniaus Region Football Association
- Kaunas County Football Federation
- Šiauliai County Football Federation
- Klaipėda County Football Federation
- Panevėžys County Football Federation
- Alytus County Football Federation
- Utena County Football Federation
- Marijampolė County Football Federation
- Telšiai County Football Federation
- Tauragė County Football Federation

== Current Season ==
In 2019 only 6 federations organized III lyga competitions, two of them ran a combined league.

Vilnius III lyga	Kaunas & Marijampolė III lyga	Klaipėda III lyga	Šiauliai III lyga	Alytus III lyga
A komanda; AFK; Aktas; FK Elektrėnų Versmė; FK Medžiai; FKK Spartakas; Granitas; Kaišiadorys-Baltai; Navigatoriai; Ozas; SK Nemenčinė-Hegvita; VJFK Trakai	Šturmas Kaunas; Lietava Jonava; FK Tauras Kaunas; FK Kėdainiai; SMK Sparta Šakiai; FK Kazlų Rūda	EMD Statyba-Sendvaris; FK Granata-Jakai; Klaipėdos FM; Sakuona-Rūgpienių kaimas; Sarema; Sparta-Newlink.lt	„Adiada“; „Kruoja-Kupsc“; FC „Saulininkas“; FK „Akmenė“-SC; FK „Akmenės Cementas B-Juventa 99“; FK „Fanai“; FK „Kražantė B“; FK „Savanoris“; FK „Venta“; Ginkūnų „Šauliai-Dakaras“	Dainava Veisiejai; Prienai-Birštonas; FK Simnas; FK Mairas Alytus

== County Leagues ==
=== Vilnius Region ===
Vilnius region league is by far the largest and most competitive. There were three more lower divisions competing in the region in 2019.

2019 season final standings:

#	Team	Played	Win	Draw	Lose	Goals+	Goals-	G.diff	Points
1.	FK Medžiai Vilnius	22	14	5	3	43	28	+15	47
2.	FK Elektrėnų Versmė	22	13	7	2	68	34	+34	46
3.	FK Navigatoriai Vilnius	22	12	4	6	66	38	+28	40
4.	FK Granitas Vilnius	22	12	4	6	62	32	+30	40
5.	AFK	22	12	4	6	49	34	+15	40
6.	FKK Spartakas Ukmergė	22	12	2	8	42	25	+17	38
7.	VJFK Trakai	22	8	3	11	44	49	-5	27
8.	FK Aktas Vilnius	22	8	2	12	38	54	-16	26
9.	A komanda	22	8	2	12	42	59	-17	26
10.	FK Ozas Vilnius	22	7	4	11	50	55	-5	25
11.	FC Kaišiadorys-Baltai	22	4	3	15	29	59	-30	15
12.	SK Nemenčinė-Hegvita	22	2	0	20	29	95	-66	6

=== Kaunas County ===
Having had abundant teams in the county in the past, in 2019 Kaunas struggled to pull enough teams together to run a league. A solution was found to run a combined league with Marijampole County.

2019 season final standings:

#	Team	Played	Win	Draw	Lose	Goals+	Goals-	G.diff	Points
1.	FK Kėdainiai	10	8	0	2	38	27	+11	24
2.	FK Kazlų Rūda	10	7	1	2	39	21	+18	22
3.	Vikingai aka Lietava	10	5	1	4	24	28	-4	16
4.	FK Tauras-Primaline	10	5	0	5	26	31	-6	15
5.	FK Šturmas	10	3	1	6	25	26	-1	10
6.	SMK Sparta-Nadruvis	10	0	1	9	19	38	-19	1

=== Klaipėda County ===
2019 season final standings:

#	Team	Played	Win	Draw	Lose	Goals+	Goals-	G.diff	Points
1	FK Sakuona-Rūgpienių kaimas	15	14	1	0	102	26	+76	43
2	FK Sarema Klaipėda	15	11	1	3	53	32	+21	34
3	Klaipėdos FM	15	8	0	7	43	52	-9	24
4	FK Granata-Jakai	15	6	0	9	39	46	-7	18
5	EDM Statyba-Sendvaris	15	5	0	10	34	69	-35	15
6	FK Sparta-Newlink.lt	15	0	0	15	14	60	-46	0

=== Šiauliai County ===
There was good turnout in 2019 in Šiauliai County with 10 teams participating. The golden match was required to decide the league winner.

2019 season final standings:

#	Team	Played	Win	Draw	Lose	Goals+	Goals-	G.diff	Points
1.	Kražantė B	18	13	3	2	53	24	+29	42*
2.	Akmenės Cementas B-Juventa-99	18	13	3	2	61	19	+42	42
3.	SK Saulininkas Šiauliai	18	12	4	2	60	26	+34	40
4.	FK Venta Kuršėnai	18	10	3	5	35	21	+14	33
5.	Adiada Šiauliai	18	7	4	7	34	35	-1	25
6.	FK Fanai Šiauliai	18	8	0	10	38	40	-2	24
7.	FK Akmenė-SC	18	7	2	9	34	35	-1	23
8.	Ginkūnų Šauliai-Dakaras	18	7	1	10	38	53	-15	22
9.	FK Kruoja-Kupsc	18	1	2	15	17	65	-48	5
10.	FK Savanoris Šiauliai	18	0	2	16	11	63	-52	2

=== Alytus County ===
A bare minimum of 4 teams participated in 2019 season, allowing to extend Alytus County III league competition run for 10 years without a break.

2019 season final standings:

#	Team	Played	Win	Draw	Lose	Goals+	Goals-	G.diff	Points
1	Prienai-Birštonas	6	3	2	1	20	9	+11	11
2	FK Simnas	6	3	1	2	7	14	-7	10
3	FK Mairas Alytus	6	2	1	3	13	10	+3	7
4	FK Dainava Veisiejai	6	0	4	2	5	12	-7	4

=== Marijampolė County ===
Due to low participant numbers in 2019 it was decided to run a combined league with Kaunas County. The county ran III league competitions regularly with an exception of 2017. See Kaunas County

=== Panevėžys County ===
For the second year in a row there were not sufficient team numbers to run a league in 2019. The county ran III league competitions regularly until then.

=== Utena County ===
For the second year in a row there were not sufficient team numbers to run a league in 2019. The county ran III league competitions only twice in the last 6 years.

=== Tauragė County ===
The last III lyga competition ran in Tauragė County was 2006.

=== Telšiai County ===
Telšiai County, the country's smallest, has never run III league competition.
