= João Luís Martins =

Portuguese footballer and coach

Personal information
- Full name: João Luís Gouveia Martins
- Date of birth: 24 April 1967 (age 59)
- Place of birth: Funchal, Portugal
- Height: 1.81 m (5 ft 11 in)
- Position: Defender

Team information
- Current team: Marítimo (president)

Youth career
- 1981–1986: Marítimo

Senior career*
Years	Team	Apps	(Gls)
1986–1996	Marítimo	131	(4)
1996–1998	Machico	29+	(1+)
Total		160+	(5+)

Managerial career
- 2003–2004: GR Cruzado Canicense
- 2004–2007: Marítimo B
- 2007: Pontassolense
- 2008: Machico
- 2009–2010: Recreativo do Libolo (assistant)
- 2010–2011: Al Ahli (assistant)
- 2011–2014: Al-Qadsiah (assistant)
- 2015: Marítimo B
- 2016–2019: Stumbras (assistant)
- 2019: Stumbras
- 2019: Žalgiris (interim)
- 2020–2021: Panevėžys
- 2024–2025: AD Camacha
- * Club domestic league appearances and goals

João Luís Gouveia Martins (born 24 April 1967) is a Portuguese football coach and former player. A defender during his playing days, he is currently the manager of Campeonato de Portugal Serie B club AD Camacha.

== Playing career ==
Martins spent his whole playing career as a defender, playing mostly with Portuguese club Marítimo. He made his European debut in the 1993–94 UEFA Cup, in Marítimo's 2–0 defeat against Royal Antwerp.

== Managerial career ==
Martins started his managerial career with GR Cruzado Canicense before spending three seasons as the manager of Marítimo B. He then spent four years as an assistant manager, including spells in Qatar with Al Ahli and in Saudi Arabia with Al-Qadsiah, before returning to manage Marítimo B in 2015. Martins was an assistant manager for Lithuanian club FC Stumbras for three years before spending a few months as their manager. In 2020, he became the manager of Lithuanian team FK Panevėžys.

== Honours ==
=== Player ===
Marítimo

- Taça de Portugal: 1994-95 (runner-up)

=== Manager ===
Panevėžys

- Lithuanian Football Cup: 2020
