= Matthew Silva (footballer) =

Portuguese footballer

Personal information
- Full name: David Marques Pereira da Silva
- Date of birth: 12 January 1992 (age 34)
- Place of birth: Quarteira, Portugal
- Height: 1.82 m (6 ft 0 in)
- Position: Midfielder

Youth career
- 2003–2005: Internacional Club Almancil
- 2005–2007: Sporting
- 2006–2011: Internacional Club Almancil

Senior career*
Years	Team	Apps	(Gls)
2011–2012	Estrela Vendas Novas	8	(0)
2012–2013	Quarteirense	12	(1)
2013	Anagennisi Epanomi	13	(0)
2013–2014	Whitehawk	20	(2)
2014–	Farense	14	(1)
2015–	→ SV Elversberg (loan)	0	(0)
- * Club domestic league appearances and goals as of 13 September 2014

David Marques Pereira da Silva (born 12 January 1992), known as Matthew Silva, is a Portuguese footballer who played as midfielder.

== Football career ==
On 21 January 2013, Silva made his professional debut with Anagennisi Epanomi in a 2012–13 Greek Football League match against Iraklis.

== Personal ==
Matthew Silva is the younger brother of Joshua Silva, also a professional footballer.
