= FK Kauno Žalgiris =

Lithuanian football club

Kauno Žalgiris
- Full name: Futbolo Klubas Kauno Žalgiris
- Nickname: Žaliai Balti (The Green-Whites)
- Founded: 2004; 22 years ago as FM Spyris
- Ground: Darius and Girėnas Stadium
- Capacity: 15,026
- Owner(s): Paulius Motiejūnas (70%); Mantas Kalnietis (30%)
- Chairman: Mantas Kalnietis
- Manager: Željko Sopić
- League: TOPLYGA
- 2026: TOPLYGA, 1st of 10 (champions)
- Website: FK Kauno Žalgiris
Home colours	Away colours	Third colours

Futbolo Klubas Kauno Žalgiris ([ˈkɒʊˑnoːˈʒaːlʲɡʲɪrʲɪs], KOW-no ZHAWL-g'yirr-iss, lit. 'Kaunas Žalgiris Football Club') is a professional football club based in Kaunas, Lithuania, that competes in the TOPLYGA, the top tier division of Lithuania. The club was founded as FM Spyris Kaunas in 2004, became the section of BC Žalgiris, and moved to their current stadium Darius and Girėnas Stadium in 2015. After their debut season in the A Lyga, the club adopted the name FK Kauno Žalgiris in 2016.

Betsson has been the main sponsor of FK Kauno Žalgiris since 2022, the partnership was renewed in July 2025 through 2027.

== History ==
=== 2005–2014: Early years ===
The idea of professional club was raised by the Kaunas football school "Tauras" in 2004, when coaches of the school decided to give an opportunity for school graduates to continue their football careers professionally, this became a reality in 2005 when FM Spyris was formed. The club initially played in the LFF II league's southern division, wearing yellow and blue. On 1 May 2005, FM Spyris played their first official match, defeated 2–1 by FK Sveikata Kybartai. For a single season in 2010, FM Spyris was renamed to FM Aisčiai Kaunas, the team finished as runners-up. Despite struggling to get back on top of the league, by 2013, the club had moved up to the LFF I league and enjoyed a couple of competitive seasons and were competitive in the LFF Cup.

=== 2015–present: Kauno Žalgiris ===
After their recent success, the club made it official that they would like to join the premier Lithuanian football league for the 2015 season, Spyris was accepted on the first check up. Before the season started it was announced that 6 new players will join the club Dzmitry Rekish, Giuseppe Palma (on loan from S.S.C. Napoli), Andrius Velička, Paulius Daukša, Klimas Gusočenko and Jevgenij Maroz. Prior to the start of the season, the club announced their cooperation with BC Žalgiris and plans of adapting the name Žalgiris. The name change would spark a controversy due to the fact another Lithuanian club FK Žalgiris Vilnius would also be competing in the league. The club from Vilnius would file a complaint under the basis of LFF regulations not allowing two teams being under the same name. On 1 March 2015, the club debuted in the A Lyga by defeating FK Klaipėdos Granitas 2–1 in Kaunas as FK Spyris Kaunas. The club's green and white kits would sport the name Žalgiris and the basketball club's logo, alongside the logo they used as FK Spyris. Spyris finished fifth in the league, also reached the Lithuanian Football Cup semi-final, but was defeated by Žalgiris Vilnius. Before the start of the 2016 season, the club changed its name to FK Kauno Žalgiris, adapting the name of the namesake basketball club. Although the newly developing fan base were happy about it, the name change was shadowed by more legal issues with FK Žalgiris Vilnius, so the future of club's name was uncertain. The club started its preseason by signing a former Kaunas football school Tauras graduate Mantas Fridrikas. Later the club announced the oldest player on the team Audrius Kšanavičius was retiring, winger Jevgenij Moroz and one of the best 2015 A lyga players, Dzmitry Rekish, were leaving the club. After a brief spell of silence, the club announced the signings of three new players just before the beginning of the season who were former FK Šiauliai right back Ernestas Pilypas, Russian winger Leonid Mushnikov, who also was part of Šiauliai team from 2011 to 2013 and 2013 Lithuanian Footballer of the Year Mindaugas Kalonas whose career at that time was on a downfall.

The club signed a contract with 2016 Best I Lyga manager Vitalijus Stankevičius.

In 2020 season, team finish third place in A Lyga. In 2021 season again finish third place and in 2022 season became a runners-up. Starting in 2022, Betsson has been the main sponsor of the team with the partnership being renewed in July 2025 through 2027.

In 2025, Kauno Žalgiris became champions of A Lyga for the first time in their history.

On 29 July 2026, after a victory against KÍ Klaksvík in the UEFA Champions League's qualification; the club secured itself a place in the league phase of the UEFA Conference League at the very minimum, becoming only the second Lithuanian club, after FK Žalgiris in 2022–23 to achieve this feat.

== Stadium ==
The club plays its home matches at the Darius and Girėnas Stadium. The stadium is a multi-use facility in Ąžuolynas park in the Žaliakalnis district of Kaunas, Lithuania. The all-seater stadium holds 15,026 spectators and is the largest in Lithuania and the Baltic States. In 1998 it was renovated according to UEFA regulations, and in 2005 it was modernized with an installation of the biggest digital scoreboard in the Baltic states. The latest renovation started in 2018 and ended in 2022. In 2022, the club enhanced their training capabilities with a 115x74x20 meter air dome.

== Kit manufacturers and shirt sponsors ==
Period	Kit manufacturer	Shirt sponsor	Ref
2004–2017	Joma		
2017–2022	Hummel		
2022–2025	Hummel	Betsson, TOPsport	
2025–	Puma	Betsson, TOPsport	

== Crest ==
FK Kauno Žalgiris is using the same logo as BC Žalgiris. The logo design is a green and white shield with the sign "BC Žalgiris", a basketball, and the letter "Ž". The club's name commemorates the victorious Battle of Žalgiris (Battle of Grunwald) (The meanings of Žalgiris and Grunwald are both "green grove").

== Honours ==
- Lithuanian Championship/A Lyga/TOPLYGA
  - Champions (2): 2025, 2026
  - Runners-up (1): 2022
  - Third place (3): 2020, 2021, 2024
  LFF taurė
  - Winners (1): 2026
- Lithuanian Supercup
  - Champions (1): 2026
  - Runners-up (1): 2023

== Rankings in domestic competitions ==
Season	League	Pos	P	W	D	L	F	A	Pts	Cup
2005	II Lyga	6th	26	13	3	10	44	43	42	
2006	II Lyga	4th	18	10	4	4	35	26	31	
2007	II Lyga	11th	26	6	7	13	40	43	25	
2008	II Lyga	7th	22	7	6	9	29	33	27	
2009	II Lyga	5th	20	9	4	7	39	25	31	
2010	II Lyga	2nd	16	12	1	3	59	17	37	
2011	II Lyga	10th	17	1	0	16	22	75	3	
2012	II Lyga	5th	22	11	3	8	60	36	36	
2013	I Lyga	5th	27	12	4	11	55	49	40	Round of 16
2014	I Lyga	4th	31	19	7	5	73	29	56	Third round
2015	TOPLYGA	5th	36	13	6	17	47	74	45	Semi-finals
2016	TOPLYGA	8th	28	2	9	17	23	55	15	Quarter-finals; Round of 32
2017	TOPLYGA	8th	28	3	6	19	19	56	15	Round of 32
2018	TOPLYGA	5th	33	11	6	16	29	41	39	Semi-finals
2019	TOPLYGA	4th	33	16	5	12	54	45	53	Quarter-finals
2020	TOPLYGA	3rd	20	12	2	6	30	18	38	Quarter-finals
2021	TOPLYGA	3rd	36	18	9	9	55	39	63	Second round
2022	TOPLYGA	2nd	36	18	9	9	55	37	63	Semi-finals
2023	TOPLYGA	4th	36	15	14	7	61	40	59	Semi-finals
2024	TOPLYGA	3rd	36	15	9	12	43	40	54	Semi-finals
2025	TOPLYGA	1st	36	22	9	5	67	26	75	Quarter-finals

== European competitions record ==
Season	Competition	Round	Club	Home	Away	Aggregate
2019–20	UEFA Europa League	1QR	(Cyprus) Apollon Limassol	0–2	0–4	0–6
2020–21	UEFA Europa League	1QR	(Norway) Bodø/Glimt	—N/a	1–6	—N/a
2021–22	UEFA Europa Conference League	1QR	(Gibraltar) Europa	2–0	0–0	2–0
2021–22	UEFA Europa Conference League	2QR	(Wales) The New Saints	0–5	1–5	1–10
2022–23	UEFA Europa Conference League	1QR	(Slovakia) Ružomberok	0–0	0–2	0–2
2023–24	UEFA Europa Conference League	2QR	(Poland) Lech Poznań	1–2	1–3	2–5
2025–26	UEFA Conference League	1QR	(Wales) Penybont	3–0	1–1	4−1
2025–26	UEFA Conference League	2QR	(Iceland) Valur	1–1	2–1	3−2
2025–26	UEFA Conference League	3QR	(Bulgaria) Arda	0–1	0–2	0–3
2026–27	UEFA Champions League	1QR	(Kosovo) Drita	1–1	3–2	4−3
2026–27	UEFA Champions League	2QR	(Faroe Islands) KÍ	1–0	0–0	1−0
2026–27	UEFA Champions League	3QR	(Croatia) Dinamo Zagreb	1–2	0–5	1–7
2026–27	UEFA Europa League	PO	(Turkey) Beşiktaş	1–0	0–3	1–3
2026–27	UEFA Conference League	LP	(England) Brighton & Hove Albion	—N/a	0–4	
2026–27	UEFA Conference League	LP	(Norway) Brann	1–4	—N/a	
2026–27	UEFA Conference League	LP	(Switzerland) Lugano	—N/a		
2026–27	UEFA Conference League	LP	(Latvia) Riga		—N/a	
2026–27	UEFA Conference League	LP	(Albania) Egnatia	—N/a		
2026–27	UEFA Conference League	LP	(Germany) SC Freiburg		—N/a	
2027–28	UEFA Champions League	1QR				

Notes:

- QR – qualifying round
- PO – play-off round

== Current squad ==
As of 5 August 2026

Note: Flags indicate national team as defined under FIFA eligibility rules; some limited exceptions apply. Players may hold more than one non-FIFA nationality.

No.	Pos.	Nation	Player
1	GK	LTU	Joris Aliukonis
2	DF	LTU	Tautvydas Burdzilauskas
3	DF	GEO	Anton Tolordava
4	DF	DEN	Luka Racic
7	MF	BEL	Amine Benchaib
8	MF	JPN	Yukiyoshi Karashima
9	FW	CRO	Leon Kreković
10	MF	LTU	Gratas Sirgėdas
11	FW	LTU	Fedor Černych
14	MF	LTU	Vykintas Slivka
15	MF	BRA	Léo Ribeiro
17	MF	CRO	Ivan Fiolić
19	FW	BRA	Renan Oliveira
20	MF	AUS	Anthony Kalik

No.	Pos.	Nation	Player
22	GK	LTU	Deividas Mikelionis
23	DF	COL	Aldayr Hernández
24	FW	LTU	Motiejus Burba
27	FW	CRO	Gabriel Debeljuh
32	MF	ARG	Franco Baldassarra
33	DF	SRB	Marko Konatar
37	DF	AUT	Nosa Edokpolor
45	DF	MTQ	Joris Moutachy
55	GK	LTU	Tomas Švedkauskas
62	DF	KOS	Lirim Kastrati
66	DF	LTU	Eduardas Jurjonas
70	MF	FRA	Fabien Ourega
77	DF	LTU	Rokas Lekiatas
99	FW	SLO	Haris Kadrić

=== Out on loan ===
Note: Flags indicate national team as defined under FIFA eligibility rules; some limited exceptions apply. Players may hold more than one non-FIFA nationality.

No.	Pos.	Nation	Player

== Technical staff ==
Position	Name
President	(Lithuania) Mantas Kalnietis
Managing director	(Lithuania) Eimantas Pūras
Head coach	(Croatia) Željko Sopić
Assistant coach	(Lithuania) Algis Jankauskas
Goalkeeper coach	(Lithuania) Audrius Ramonas
Fitness coach	(Croatia) Ivan Ćuković
Doctor	(Lithuania) Algirdas Narkevičius
Physio	(Lithuania) Tomas Buragas
Analyst	(Lithuania) Rokas Pranaitis
Analyst	(Croatia) Josip Paušić
