= List of Lithuanian football transfers winter 2024–25 =

This is a list of Lithuanian football transfers in the winter transfer window 2024–25 by club. Only clubs of the 2025 Lithuanian A Lyga are included.

== Lithuanian A Lyga ==
=== Žalgiris ===
In: Note: Flags indicate national team as defined under FIFA eligibility rules; some limited exceptions apply. Players may hold more than one non-FIFA nationality.

No.	Pos.	Nation	Player
—	DF	LTU	Džiugas Aleksa (loan return from Džiugas)
—	DF	SWE	Mohamed Youla (from (Sweden) Örebro Syrianska IF)
—	DF	POR	Bruno Tavares (from (Latvia) Auda)
—	MF	LTU	Motiejus Burba (loan return from Sūduva)
—	MF	LTU	Dariuš Stankevičius (loan return from Sūduva)
—	MF	LTU	Meinardas Mikulėnas (loan return from Džiugas)
—	MF	LTU	Gustas Jarusevičius (from FK TransINVEST)
—	MF	SWE	Dino Salčinović (from (Sweden) Örebro Syrianska IF)
—	MF	COM	Kassim Hadji (from (Armenia) Ararat Yerevan)
—	MF	LTU	Nedas Klimavičius (from FK TransINVEST)

Out: Note: Flags indicate national team as defined under FIFA eligibility rules; some limited exceptions apply. Players may hold more than one non-FIFA nationality.

No.	Pos.	Nation	Player
—	GK	SRB	Dušan Markovic (Released)
—	DF	FRA	Joel Bopesu (Released)
—	MF	JPN	Yukiyoshi Karashima (to (Latvia) RFS)
—	MF	UKR	Myroslav Mazur (Released)
—	MF	NED	Leandro Fernandes (Released)
—	FW	ROU	Liviu Antal (to (Romania) Zalău)
—	FW	LTU	Romualdas Jansonas (to FK Kauno Žalgiris)

=== Hegelmann ===
In: Note: Flags indicate national team as defined under FIFA eligibility rules; some limited exceptions apply. Players may hold more than one non-FIFA nationality.

No.	Pos.	Nation	Player
—	GK	LTU	Rokas Bagdonavičius (from Nevėžis)
—	DF	ISR	Jonathan Mulder (from (Netherlands) TOP Oss)
—	DF	SRB	Nikola Djoric (from Austria Klagenfurt)
—	DF	JPN	Carlos Duke (from (Latvia) Valmiera)
—	MF	CIV	Harouna Abdoul Samad (from (Ivory Coast) USC Bassam)
—	MF	FRA	Yanis Azouazi (from (France) Montpellier B)
—	MF	LTU	Donatas Kazlauskas (from FA Šiauliai)
—	FW	LTU	Justas Paštukas (from FK Banga)

Out: Note: Flags indicate national team as defined under FIFA eligibility rules; some limited exceptions apply. Players may hold more than one non-FIFA nationality.

No.	Pos.	Nation	Player
—	GK	LTU	Emilis Urbonas (Released)
—	DF	BRA	Hugo Figueredo (to FK Banga)
—	DF	CMR	Steve Kingue (to (Poland) Radomiak Radom)
—	MF	BRA	Michael Thuique (Released)
—	MF	LTU	Kipras Olšauskas (Released)
—	MF	LTU	Titas Buzas (Released)
—	MF	BRA	Felipe Brisola (Released)
—	MF	NGA	Bolaji Ayaji (Released)
—	MF	AUT	Denis Bošnjak (Released)
—	FW	LTU	Matas Vareika (to (Armenia) Pyunik)

=== Kauno Žalgiris ===
In: Note: Flags indicate national team as defined under FIFA eligibility rules; some limited exceptions apply. Players may hold more than one non-FIFA nationality.

No.	Pos.	Nation	Player
—	GK	LTU	Tomas Švedkauskas (from FK Panevėžys)
—	DF	LTU	Eduardas Jurjonas (from Be1)
—	DF	LTU	Tautvydas Burdzilauskas (from FK Sūduva)
—	DF	GEO	Anton Tolordava (from (Georgia (country)) FC Telavi)
—	DF	GER	Haymenn Bah-Traoré (from (Finland) FC Haka)
—	DF	AUT	Nosa Edokpolor (from (Georgia (country)) Dinamo Tbilisi)
—	MF	BEL	Amine Benchaib (from FK Panevėžys)
—	MF	LTU	Ernestas Burdzilauskas (from FK Sūduva)
—	MF	SRB	Damjan Pavlović (from (Croatia) Rijeka)
—	FW	GEO	Temur Chogadze (from (Kazakhstan) Zhetysu)
—	FW	LTU	Valdas Paulaskas (from FK Banga)
—	FW	LTU	Romualdas Jansonas (from Žalgiris)

Out: Note: Flags indicate national team as defined under FIFA eligibility rules; some limited exceptions apply. Players may hold more than one non-FIFA nationality.

No.	Pos.	Nation	Player
—	GK	LTU	Ignas Plūkas (to FK Sūduva)
—	DF	BIH	Numan Kurdič (Released)
—	DF	FRA	Maxime Spano (Released)
—	DF	FIN	Matias Rale (to (Finland) Ilves)
—	DF	NGA	Seth Sincere (Released)
—	DF	FRA	Quentin Bena (Released)
—	MF	SVN	Žan Benedičič (Released)
—	MF	GHA	David Anane (Released)
—	MF	JOR	Jonathan Tamimi (Released)
—	MF	LTU	Artūr Dolžnikov (to (Czech Republic) SK Sigma Olomouc)
—	MF	LTU	Karolis Šilkaitis (to FC Džiugas)

=== Dainava ===
In: Note: Flags indicate national team as defined under FIFA eligibility rules; some limited exceptions apply. Players may hold more than one non-FIFA nationality.

No.	Pos.	Nation	Player
—	DF	GEO	Nikoloz Chikovani (on loan from (Latvia) Liepāja)
—	DF	LTU	Ernestas Stočkūnas (from FK TransINVEST)
—	DF	SEN	Cheikh Faye (from (Latvia) Liepāja)
—	MF	SRB	Marko Pavlovski (Free Agent)
—	FW	COD	Francis Eusebio Mbaki (Free Agent)

Out: Note: Flags indicate national team as defined under FIFA eligibility rules; some limited exceptions apply. Players may hold more than one non-FIFA nationality.

No.	Pos.	Nation	Player
—	DF	UKR	Glib Grachov (Released)
—	DF	GAM	Lamin Jawara (Released)
—	DF	MNE	Andrija Krivokapič (Released)
—	MF	NGA	Aaron Olugbogi (to FK Banga)
—	MF	NGA	Chibuike Nwosu (Released)
—	MF	LTU	Rokas Stanulevičius (Released)
—	MF	UKR	Stanislav Sorokin (to (Kyrgyzstan) Dordoi Bishkek)
—	MF	NGA	Ode Abdullahi (to (Cyprus) Aris Limassol)

=== Banga ===
In: Note: Flags indicate national team as defined under FIFA eligibility rules; some limited exceptions apply. Players may hold more than one non-FIFA nationality.

No.	Pos.	Nation	Player
—	GK	LTU	Armantas Vitkauskas (from Riteriai)
—	DF	BRA	Hugo Figueredo (from FC Hegelmann)
—	DF	LTU	Deividas Malžinskas (from FK TransINVEST)
—	DF	GUI	Simão Júnior (from (Georgia (country)) FC Telavi)
—	DF	NGA	Akpe Victory (Free Agent)
—	MF	LVA	Aivars Emsis (from FK Sūduva)
—	MF	NGA	Aaron Olugbogi (from DFK Dainava)
—	MF	NED	Nouri El Harmazi (from (Netherlands) RKC Waalwijk)

Out: Note: Flags indicate national team as defined under FIFA eligibility rules; some limited exceptions apply. Players may hold more than one non-FIFA nationality.

No.	Pos.	Nation	Player
—	GK	LTU	Kornelijus Smilingis (to FK TransINVEST)
—	DF	LTU	Justinas Januševskis (to FK Panevėžys)
—	DF	UKR	Kostyantyn Shults (Released)
—	MF	LTU	Robertas Veževičius (Retired)
—	MF	LTU	Vilius Piliukaitis (to FC Džiugas)
—	FW	LTU	Valdas Paulaskas (to FK Kauno Žalgiris)
—	FW	LTU	Justas Paštukas (to FC Hegelmann)

=== Džiugas ===
In: Note: Flags indicate national team as defined under FIFA eligibility rules; some limited exceptions apply. Players may hold more than one non-FIFA nationality.

No.	Pos.	Nation	Player
—	DF	POR	Gabriel Castro (from (Portugal) 1.º Dezembro)
—	DF	UKR	Oleksandr Chernozub (on loan from (Latvia) Liepāja)
—	MF	LTU	Simonas Urbys (from FA Šiauliai)
—	MF	LTU	Karolis Šilkaitis (from Žalgiris)
—	MF	LTU	Vilius Piliukaitis (from FK Banga)
—	MF	UKR	Oleksandr Kurtsev (from (Latvia) Metta/LU)

Out: Note: Flags indicate national team as defined under FIFA eligibility rules; some limited exceptions apply. Players may hold more than one non-FIFA nationality.

No.	Pos.	Nation	Player
—	GK	LVA	Ivans Baturins (to (Estonia) Harju)
—	DF	LTU	Džiugas Aleksa (loan return to Žalgiris)
—	DF	UKR	Sergiy Kulynych (Released)
—	MF	LTU	Meinardas Mikulėnas (loan return to Žalgiris)
—	MF	LTU	Dominykas Kubilinskas (loan return to FA Šiauliai)
—	MF	POR	Joaquim Domingos (Released)
—	FW	NED	Nino Noordanus (to (Slovenia) Celje)
—	FW	GER	Leif Estevez Fernandez (to Riteriai)

=== Šiauliai ===
In: Note: Flags indicate national team as defined under FIFA eligibility rules; some limited exceptions apply. Players may hold more than one non-FIFA nationality.

No.	Pos.	Nation	Player
—	DF	LTU	Kristupas Keršys (from (Latvia) Metta/LU, was on loan)
—	MF	LTU	Dominykas Kubilinskas (loan return from FC Džiugas)
—	MF	EST	Nikita Komissarov (from (Estonia) Nõmme Kalju)
—	MF	POR	Bernardo da Silva (Free Agent)

Out: Note: Flags indicate national team as defined under FIFA eligibility rules; some limited exceptions apply. Players may hold more than one non-FIFA nationality.

No.	Pos.	Nation	Player
—	DF	LTU	Rolandas Baravykas (Released)
—	DF	LTU	Egidijus Vaitkunas (Released)
—	DF	LTU	Sigitas Olberkis (to (Albania) Elbasani)
—	MF	LTU	Simonas Paulius (Released)
—	MF	LTU	Donatas Kazlauskas (to FC Hegelmann)
—	MF	LTU	Simonas Urbys (to FC Džiugas)
—	MF	LTU	Mantas Kuklys (Retired)
—	FW	LVA	Dāvis Ikaunieks (to (Brunei) DPMM)
—	FW	LTU	Nauris Petkevičius (to FK Sūduva)

=== Panevėžys ===
In: Note: Flags indicate national team as defined under FIFA eligibility rules; some limited exceptions apply. Players may hold more than one non-FIFA nationality.

No.	Pos.	Nation	Player
—	DF	LTU	Justinas Januševskis (from FK Banga)
—	DF	KOS	Laurit Krasniqi (from (Belgium) Antwerp)
—	DF	MLI	Abdoul Karim Dante (from (Luxembourg) FC Swift Hesperange)
—	MF	CIV	Salomon Kouadio (from (Ivory Coast) SC d'Adjamé)
—	MF	FRA	Jérôme Simon (from (Luxembourg) FC Swift Hesperange)
—	FW	BRA	Elivelto (from (Greece) Kalamata)
—	FW	LTU	Faustas Steponavičius (on loan from (Bulgaria) Botev Plovdiv)

Out: Note: Flags indicate national team as defined under FIFA eligibility rules; some limited exceptions apply. Players may hold more than one non-FIFA nationality.

No.	Pos.	Nation	Player
—	GK	MDA	Emil Timbur (Released)
—	GK	LTU	Tomas Švedkauskas (to FK Kauno Žalgiris)
—	DF	SRB	Milos Vranjanin (Released)
—	DF	SVK	Robert Mazan (Released)
—	DF	LTU	Markas Beneta (to FK Sūduva)
—	MF	BEL	Amine Benchaib (to FK Kauno Žalgiris)
—	MF	MNE	Jovan Cadjenovic (Released)
—	MF	ARG	Nicolas Gorobsov (Released)
—	MF	LTU	Aironas Trakšelis (Released)
—	MF	GER	Federico Palacios (Released)
—	MF	LTU	Nojus Lukšys (to FK Sūduva)
—	FW	NOR	Sivert Gussias (Released)

=== Sūduva ===
In: Note: Flags indicate national team as defined under FIFA eligibility rules; some limited exceptions apply. Players may hold more than one non-FIFA nationality.

No.	Pos.	Nation	Player
—	GK	LTU	Ignas Plūkas (from FK Kauno Žalgiris)
—	MF	LTU	Markas Beneta (from FK Panevėžys)
—	MF	JPN	Kota Sakurai (from FK TransINVEST)
—	MF	LTU	Nojus Lukšys (from FK Panevėžys)
—	MF	MSR	Amar Haidara (on loan from (Latvia) Liepāja)
—	FW	LTU	Nauris Petkevičius (from FA Šiauliai)
—	FW	AFG	Omran Haydary (from (Georgia (country)) FC Samtredia)
—	FW	NGA	Idris Momoh (on loan from (Poland) Miedź)

Out: Note: Flags indicate national team as defined under FIFA eligibility rules; some limited exceptions apply. Players may hold more than one non-FIFA nationality.

No.	Pos.	Nation	Player
—	DF	LTU	Tautvydas Burdzilauskas (to FK Kauno Žalgiris)
—	DF	UKR	Ivan Zotko (to (Kyrgyzstan) Kara-Shoro Ozgon)
—	MF	LTU	Motiejus Burba (loan return to Žalgiris)
—	MF	LTU	Dariuš Stankevičius (loan return to Žalgiris)
—	MF	LTU	Ernestas Burdzilauskas (to FK Kauno Žalgiris)
—	MF	LVA	Aivars Emsis (to FK Banga)

=== Riteriai ===
In: Note: Flags indicate national team as defined under FIFA eligibility rules; some limited exceptions apply. Players may hold more than one non-FIFA nationality.

No.	Pos.	Nation	Player
—	FW	GER	Leif Estevez Fernandez (from FC Džiugas)

Out: Note: Flags indicate national team as defined under FIFA eligibility rules; some limited exceptions apply. Players may hold more than one non-FIFA nationality.

No.	Pos.	Nation	Player
—	GK	LTU	Armantas Vitkauskas (to FK Banga)
—	FW	GEO	Anri Rosiveri (Released)
