= 2021 A Lyga =

Lyga football

A Lyga
- Season: 2021
- Dates: 5 March – November 2021
- Champions: Žalgiris
- Champions League: Žalgiris
- Conference League: Sūduva; Kauno Žalgiris; Panevėžys
- Matches: 180
- Goals: 493 (2.74 per match)
- Top goalscorer: Hugo Videmont (17 goals)
- Biggest home win: Kauno Žalgiris 5–0 Nevėžis (14 March 2021)
- Biggest away win: Banga 1–5 Kauno Žalgiris (25 April 2021)
- Highest scoring: Banga 5–2 Nevėžis (21 April 2021)
- Longest winning run: 7 matches Sūduva
- Longest unbeaten run: 12 matches Sūduva
- Longest winless run: 12 matches Nevėžis
- Longest losing run: 12 matches Nevėžis
- All statistics correct as of 29 May 2021.

The 2021 A Lyga, for sponsorship reasons also called Optibet A lyga is the 32nd season of the A Lyga, the top-tier football league of Lithuania. The season began on 5 March and concluded on 28 November 2021.

== Teams ==
FK Žalgiris started the season as defending champions. None of the 6 last year's teams were relegated, and 4 teams were promoted to A lyga.

=== Licensing process ===
In addition to sporting principles of promotion and relegation, the teams and clubs need to pass rigorous licensing process. Because of this, promotion and relegation does not always follow the rights achieved by sporting principle. A total of 12 teams applied for A lyga license:

The 6 previous season's teams:

FK Žalgiris, FK Sūduva Marijampolė, FK Kauno Žalgiris, FK Panevėžys, FK Banga Gargždai and FK Riteriai met licensing criteria and received a straight pass to their licenses.

Top 4 2020 LFF I Lyga teams:

FK „Nevėžis“ (Kėdainiai), FC „Hegelmann Litauen“ (Kaunas), FK „Jonava“ (Jonava), FC „Džiugas“ (Telšiai) have all applied. FK Nevėžis and FC Hegelmann Litauen got their licenses straight away. FC Džiugas has been granted a license after an appeal. FK Jonava failed to meet all licensing criteria and were not issued a license. The club appealed, the appeal was rejected, then the club requested participation by exception — a method used by Lithuanian Football Federation to make up numbers in the league after licensing fails. The request was also rejected by LFF council's vote in favour to 6th placed DFK Dainava.

Other 2020 LFF I Lyga teams:

FA „Šiauliai“ (Šiauliai), DFK „Dainava“ (Alytus). FA Šiauliai later withdrew from licensing process, claiming that the team is not yet ready for top division football. DFK Dainava failed licensing criteria, however after FK Jonava's failure to meet licensing criteria, DFK Dainava were invited to request participation by exception, and were ultimately promoted to the A lyga.

The controversial decision to drop FK Jonava and promote DFK Dainava was justified by the fact that FK Jonava have pending investigation to allegations of match fixing in the 2020 season. The LFF have issued sanctions and fines against three players and the club, however FK Jonava deny allegations of involvement in match fixing in the three matches that are being investigated and have appealed. The LFF have also revealed that a warning letter has been issued to FK Jonava in relation to the team's coach, who has been reportedly involved in match fixing in his previous career.

=== Changes ===
FK Nevėžis (Kėdainiai), FC Hegelmann Litauen (Kaunas), FC Džiugas (Telšiai) and DFK Dainava (Alytus), the latter three teams promoted to the top-flight for the first time in their history, were promoted from the 2020 LFF I Lyga.

Home towns of the 2020 A Lyga teams
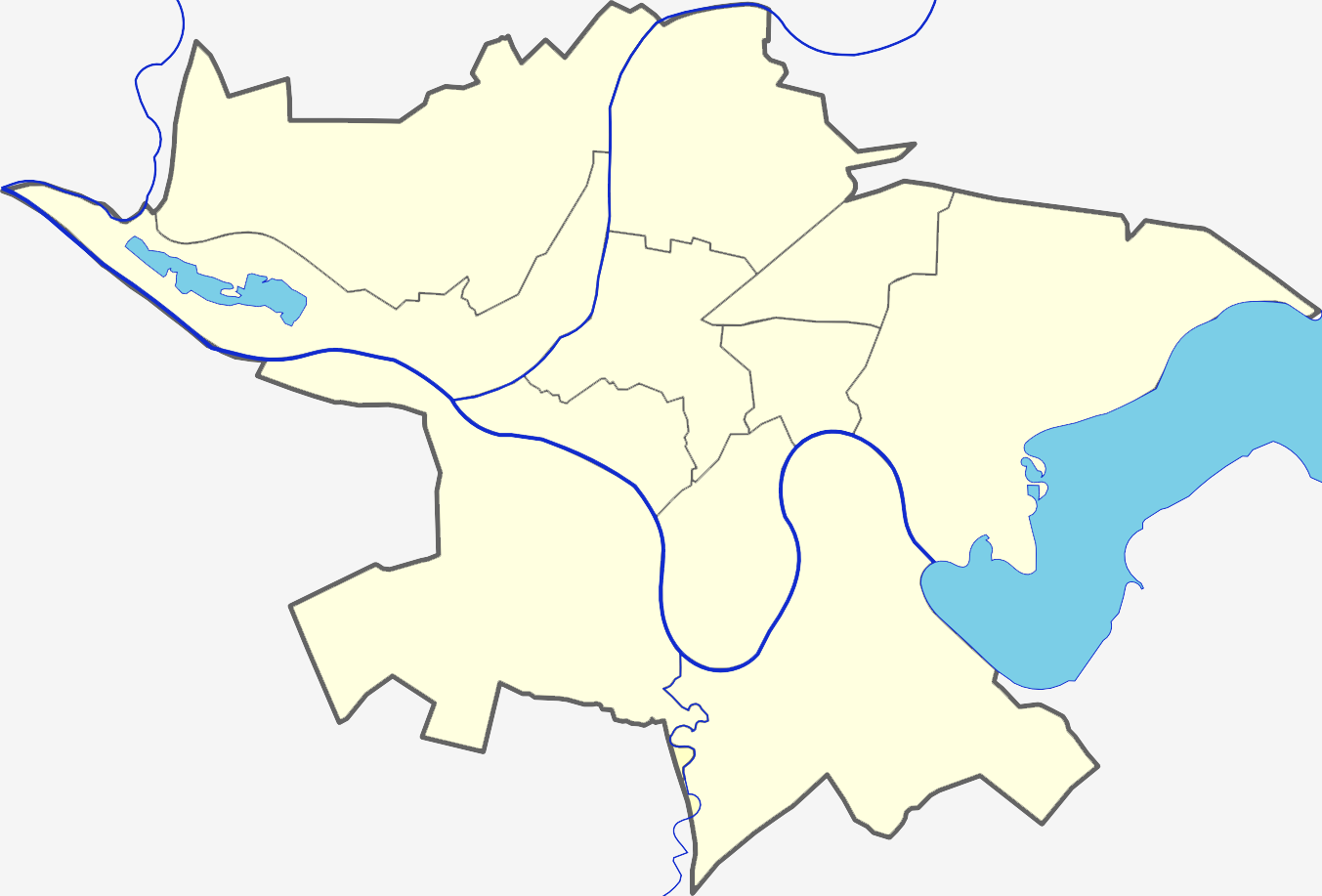
Kaunas teams

2021 A Lyga competitors
Club	Location	Stadium	Surface	Capacity	Seasons in A Lyga	2020 position
Banga	Gargždai	Gargždai Stadium	Artificial	2,323	8	4th
Banga	Gargždai	—	—	—	8	4th
Dainava	Alytus	Alytus Stadium	Natural	3,790	1	6th in LFF I lyga
Dainava	Alytus	Dainava Progymnasium Stadium	Artificial	—	1	6th in LFF I lyga
Dainava	Alytus	Marijampolė Football Indoor Arena (Hikvision FIA)	Artificial	2,660	1	6th in LFF I lyga
Džiugas	Telšiai	Telšiai Central Stadium	Natural	2,400	1	4th in LFF I lyga
Džiugas	Telšiai	Ateitis Progymnasium Stadium	—	—	1	4th in LFF I lyga
Hegelmann Litauen	Kaunas	LFF Kaunas training center stadium	Artificial	500	1	2nd in LFF I lyga
Hegelmann Litauen	Kaunas	—	—	—	1	2nd in LFF I lyga
Kauno Žalgiris	Kaunas	SM Tauras Stadium	Natural	500	7	3rd
Kauno Žalgiris	Kaunas	NFA Stadium	Artificial	500	7	3rd
Nevėžis	Kėdainiai	Kėdainiai Stadium	Artificial	3,000	6	1st in LFF I lyga
Nevėžis	Kėdainiai	Central Stadium of Jonava	Natural	2,000	6	1st in LFF I lyga
Panevėžys	Panevėžys	Aukštaitija Stadium	Natural	6,600	3	5th
Panevėžys	Panevėžys	Žemyna Progymnasium Stadium	Artificial	500	3	5th
Riteriai	Vilnius	LFF Stadium	Artificial	5,067	8	6th
Riteriai	Vilnius	Sportima Arena	Artificial	3,157	8	6th
Sūduva	Marijampolė	Sūduva Stadium (Hikvision Arena)	Natural	6,250	19	2nd
Sūduva	Marijampolė	Marijampolė Football Indoor Arena (Hikvision FIA)	Artificial	2,660	19	2nd
Žalgiris	Vilnius	LFF Stadium	Artificial	5,067	20	1st
Žalgiris	Vilnius	Sportima Arena	Artificial	3,157	20	1st

=== 2021 competitors ===
==== Personnel ====
Team	Coach	License
FK Banga	(Portugal) David Afonso	Not sure.
DFK Dainava	(Lithuania) Tomas Ražanauskas	UEFA A
FC Džiugas Telšiai	(Lithuania) Marius Šluta	UEFA B
FC Hegelmann Litauen	(Lithuania) Andrius Skerla	Not sure.
FK Kauno Žalgiris	(Lithuania) Rokas Garastas	UEFA Pro
FK Nevėžis	(Lithuania) Darius Gvildys (on temporary basis)	UEFA A
FK Panevėžys	(Portugal) João Luís Martins	UEFA A
FK Riteriai	(Portugal) Miguel Moreira	UEFA Pro
FK Sūduva	(Spain) Víctor Basadre	UEFA Pro
FK Žalgiris	(Kazakhstan) Vladimir Cheburin	UEFA Pro

==== Managerial changes ====
Team	Outgoing manager	Manner of departure	Date of vacancy	Incoming manager	Date of appointment
FK Panevėžys	—	addition to coaching team	—	(Portugal) Luís Olim	22 December 2020
FC Hegelmann Litauen	(Lithuania) Artūras Ramoška	reassigned as goalkeeping coach	2 January 2021	(Lithuania) Andrius Skerla	2 January 2021
FK Sūduva	(Lithuania) Saulius Širmelis	end of contract	November 2020	(Spain) Víctor Basadre	3 January 2021
FK Žalgiris	(Belarus) Aleksey Baga	resigned	December 2020	(Kazakhstan) Vladimir Cheburin	11 January 2021
FK Riteriai	(Finland) Tommi Pikkarainen	new manager appointed	8 February 2021	(Belarus) Sergei Gurenko	8 February 2021
DFK Dainava	(Italy) Fabio Mazzone	resigned	12 April 2021	(Lithuania) Tomas Ražanauskas	21 April 2021
FK Nevėžis	(Lithuania) Vitalijus Stankevičius	by mutual consent	17 May 2021	(Lithuania) Darius Gvildys (on temporary basis)	18 May 2021
FK Riteriai	(Belarus) Sergei Gurenko	end of probationary contract	31 May 2021	(Lithuania) Valdas Trakys (on temporary basis)	9 June 2021
FK Banga	(Lithuania) Tomas Tamošauskas	sacked	3 June 2021	(Portugal) David Afonso	3 June 2021
FK Riteriai	(Lithuania) Valdas Trakys	permanent manager appointed	3 August 2021	(Portugal) Miguel Moreira	3 August 2021

== Effects of the COVID-19 pandemic ==
As soon as 2020 A Lyga season has completed, on 7 November 2020 COVID-19 quarantine was reintroduced in Lithuania, and extended several times. At the beginning of February, at the time LFF were building fixtures calendar, the quarantine was set to last until 28 February.

It is expected that at the beginning of the championship the matches will take place without spectators. Under the government's proposal, the matches can be attended by 100 spectators when the rate of COVID-19 infections per 100,000 inhabitants in 14 day period will drop below 50. The matches can be attended by 200 spectators when COVID-19 cases will drop below 25. On 4 February infection rate was 395.3.

Approaching the start date of the championship, scheduled for 5 March 2021, the clubs performed mandatory COVID-19 testing. Three clubs have reported infections among the players and their fixtures have been postponed. FK Žalgiris reported 7 positive cases of COVID-19, FK Panevėžys - 6, FK Riteriai initially did not reveal the number, but it was later revealed that 19 players and staff were tested positive.

== Regular season ==
The season has kicked off as scheduled on 5 March. Each team will play four matches with all other teams this season.

=== League table ===
Pos	Team	Pld	W	D	L	GF	GA	GD	Pts	Qualification or relegation
1	Žalgiris (C)	36	23	10	3	76	28	+48	79	Qualification for the Champions League first qualifying round
2	Sūduva	36	21	7	8	64	33	+31	70	Qualification for the Europa Conference League second qualifying round
3	Kauno Žalgiris	36	18	9	9	55	39	+16	63	Qualification for the Europa Conference League first qualifying round
4	Panevėžys	36	16	12	8	55	40	+15	60	Qualification for the Europa Conference League first qualifying round
5	Hegelmann Litauen	36	14	11	11	53	38	+15	53	
6	Riteriai	36	10	16	10	49	37	+12	46	
7	Banga	36	10	6	20	40	71	−31	36	
8	Džiugas	36	8	12	16	47	60	−13	36	
9	Dainava (Note: DFK Dainava started the season with 3 points deducted as the club had not met licensing criteria but were granted participation under the rule of exception.) (R)	36	9	11	16	39	56	−17	35	Relegation to I Lyga
10	Nevėžis (R)	36	2	4	30	15	91	−76	10	Relegation to I Lyga

Source: Flashscore
Rules for classification: 1) Points; 2) Play-off (for champion only) 3) Head-to-head points; 4) Head-to-head goal difference; 5) Head-to-head goals scored; 6) Head-to-head matches won; 7) Goal difference; 8) Goals scored; 9) Matches won; 10) Fairplay ranking; 11) Draw.
(C) Champions; (R) Relegated

=== Fixtures and results ===
==== Rounds 1–18 ====
Home \ Away	BAN	DAI	DZI	HEG	KAU	NEV	PAN	RIT	SUD	ZAL
Banga	—	2–0	1–0	0–2	1–5	5–2	2–2	0–2	1–2	1–3
Dainava	3–1	—	1–1	1–2	0–1	0–2	1–3	1–1	1–1	2–4
Džiugas	1–1	2–3	—	2–1	1–1	3–0	0–2	1–4	2–1	0–3
Hegelmann Litauen	0–1	0–1	1–1	—	2–3	2–0	0–0	2–0	0–1	2–1
Kauno Žalgiris	1–0	1–0	1–0	2–2	—	5–0	1–2	2–1	1–0	0–1
Nevėžis	0–2	0–1	2–1	0–1	1–2	—	0–1	0–0	0–2	0–3
Panevėžys	4–2	3–0	1–0	2–2	2–1	4–2	—	1–1	0–0	0–2
Riteriai	3–0	2–2	1–1	1–3	1–2	4–0	2–0	—	1–1	1–1
Sūduva	4–0	3–1	2–1	2–0	2–1	1–0	0–1	2–0	—	0–2
Žalgiris	2–0	5–1	2–2	2–0	2–2	2–0	1–0	2–0	1–2	—

Source: Flashscore
Legend: Blue = home team win; Yellow = draw; Red = away team win.

==== Rounds 19–36 ====
Home \ Away	BAN	DAI	DZI	HEG	KAU	NEV	PAN	RIT	SUD	ZAL
Banga	—	1–1	2–1	1–4	2–3	3–1	2–1	1–1	0–2	0–3
Dainava	3–1	—	3–2	1–1	0–1	1–1	1–2	2–1	1–2	0–2
Džiugas	1–1	1–1	—	2–1	1–5	2–0	2–2	2–0	2–3	2–1
Hegelmann Litauen	4–1	1–1	1–1	—	1–2	2–0	1–0	0–0	2–1	1–1
Kauno Žalgiris	0–1	2–0	0–1	2–1	—	2–0	1–1	1–1	3–3	0–2
Nevėžis	0–3	0–1	1–1	0–6	1–1	—	1–3	0–6	0–3	1–3
Panevėžys	3–1	0–0	2–2	2–2	4–0	3–0	—	0–2	1–1	1–1
Riteriai	0–0	2–1	3–2	0–0	0–0	4–0	1–2	—	1–3	0–0
Sūduva	4–0	0–1	3–1	1–2	2–0	2–0	3–0	1–1	—	2–2
Žalgiris	3–0	2–2	3–2	2–1	0–0	6–0	2–0	1–1	3–2	—

Source: Flashscore
Legend: Blue = home team win; Yellow = draw; Red = away team win.

== Statistics ==
=== Top goalscorers ===
Goals	Assists	Player	Club
17	12	(France) Hugo Videmont	FK Žalgiris
16	5	(Lithuania) Nauris Petkevičius	FC Hegelmann Litauen
16	2	(Netherlands) Saïd Hamulic	DFK Dainava
12	1	(Lithuania) Mindaugas Grigaravičius	FK Riteriai
11	2	(Bulgaria) Nasko Milev	FC Džiugas
11	2	(Lithuania) Simonas Urbys	FK Banga Gargždai
10	5	(Croatia) Josip Tadić	FK Žalgiris
10	2	(Brazil) Jorge Elias	FK Panevėžys
10	2	(Lithuania) Linas Pilibaitis	FK Kauno Žalgiris

== See also ==
- 2021 LFF I Lyga
- Football in Lithuania
- 2021 Lithuanian Football Cup
