= 2025 A Lyga =

A Lyga
- Season: 2025
- Dates: 28 February 2025 – 8 November 2025
- Champions: Kauno Žalgiris (1st title)
- Relegated: Dainava
- Champions League: Kauno Žalgiris
- Conference League: Hegelmann; Panevėžys; Žalgiris
- Matches: 180
- Goals: 479 (2.66 per match)
- Top goalscorer: Eligijus Jankauskas (18 goals)
- Biggest home win: Banga 6–0 Dainava (2 November 2025)
- Biggest away win: Banga 0–5 Dainava (24 August 2025)
- Highest scoring: Riteriai 3–4 Sūduva (1 March 2025); Hegelmann 5–2 Šiauliai (5 July 2025); Kauno Žalgiris 6–1 Riteriai (14 September 2025)
- Longest winning run: 7 matches Kauno Žalgiris
- Longest unbeaten run: 14 matches Kauno Žalgiris; Žalgiris
- Longest winless run: 16 matches Dainava
- Longest losing run: 6 matches Riteriai; Dainava
- Highest attendance: 6,675; Kauno Žalgiris 0–0 Sūduva (12 April 2025)
- Lowest attendance: 40; Riteriai 1–0 Šiauliai (19 June 2025)
- Total attendance: 122,253
- Average attendance: 679

The 2025 A Lyga, for sponsorship reasons also called TOPsport A Lyga, was the 36th season of the A Lyga, the top-tier football league of Lithuania. The season began on 28 February 2025 and ended on 8 November 2025.

== Teams ==
The league consisted of ten teams; the top nine teams from the previous season, and one team promoted from the LFF I Lyga. Žalgiris entered the season as defending champions.

The promoted team was the 2024 LFF I Lyga champions Riteriai (returning to the A Lyga after a single-season absence). They replaced the 2024 A Lyga bottom-placed team TransINVEST (relegated from the A Lyga after a single season).

Locations of the 2025 A Lyga teams

2025 A Lyga competitors
Club	Location	Stadium	Surface	Capacity	Seasons in A Lyga	Position in 2024
Banga	Gargždai	Gargždai Stadium	Artificial	2,216	12	5th
DFK Dainava	Alytus	Alytus Stadium	Natural	3,726	14	4th
DFK Dainava	Marijampolė	Marijampolė Football Indoor Arena	Artificial	2,660	14	4th
Džiugas	Telšiai	Telšiai Central Stadium	Natural	2,069	5	6th
Džiugas	Telšiai	?	Artificial	?	5	6th
Hegelmann	Kaunas	Raudondvaris Stadium	Artificial	490	5	2nd
Kauno Žalgiris	Kaunas	Darius and Girėnas Stadium	Hybrid	15,026	11	3rd
Kauno Žalgiris	Akademija	VDU Stadium	Artificial	1,000	11	3rd
Panevėžys	Panevėžys	Aukštaitija Stadium	Natural	6,600	7	8th
Panevėžys	Panevėžys	FA Panevėžys stadium	Artificial	660	7	8th
FK Riteriai	Vilnius	LFF Stadium	Artificial	5,067	11	1st in I Lyga
FA Šiauliai	Šiauliai	Savivaldybė Stadium	Natural	3,017	4	7th
FA Šiauliai	Šiauliai	Gytariai Stadium	Artificial	500	4	7th
FA Šiauliai	Šiauliai	Sportima Arena	Artificial	3,157	4	7th
Sūduva	Marijampolė	Marijampolė Football Arena	Natural	6,523	23	9th
Sūduva	Marijampolė	Marijampolė Football Indoor Arena	Artificial	2,660	23	9th
Žalgiris	Vilnius	LFF Stadium	Artificial	5,067	24	1st
Žalgiris	Vilnius	Sportima Arena	Artificial	3,157	24	1st

=== Managers ===
Team	Coach	Appointed	Licence
FK Banga	(Portugal) David Afonso	60 months ago	UEFA Pro
DFK Dainava	(Turkmenistan) Mergen Orazov	11 months ago	UEFA Pro
FC Džiugas	(Lithuania) Andrius Lipskis	29 months ago	UEFA A
FC Hegelmann	(Lithuania) Andrius Skerla	65 months ago	UEFA Pro
FK Kauno Žalgiris	(Lithuania) Eivinas Černiauskas	18 months ago	UEFA Pro
FK Panevėžys	(Germany) Roland Vrabec	18 months ago	UEFA Pro
FK Riteriai	(Cyprus) Nicolas Vitorović	16 months ago	UEFA Pro
FA Šiauliai	(Latvia) Dainis Kazakevičs	18 months ago	UEFA Pro
FK Sūduva	(Lithuania) Donatas Vencevičius	18 months ago	UEFA Pro
FK Žalgiris	(Kazakhstan) Vladimir Cheburin	65 months ago	UEFA Pro

== League table ==
Pos	Team	Pld	W	D	L	GF	GA	GD	Pts	Qualification or relegation
1	Kauno Žalgiris (C)	36	22	9	5	67	26	+41	75	Qualification for the Champions League first qualifying round
2	Hegelmann	36	21	4	11	56	43	+13	67	Qualification for the Conference League first qualifying round
3	Žalgiris	36	17	11	8	54	41	+13	62	Qualification for the Conference League first qualifying round
4	Sūduva	36	15	14	7	48	36	+12	59	
5	Šiauliai	36	14	10	12	59	53	+6	52	
6	Panevėžys	36	14	7	15	56	49	+7	49	Qualification for the Conference League second qualifying round (Note: Panevėžys qualified for the Conference League second qualifying round as the 2025 Lithuanian Football Cup winners.)
7	Džiugas	36	13	7	16	37	45	−8	46	
8	Banga	36	11	9	16	38	36	+2	42	
9	Riteriai (O)	36	6	8	22	37	74	−37	26	Qualification for the A Lyga play-off
10	Dainava (R)	36	3	9	24	27	76	−49	18	Relegation to the 2026 I Lyga

Source: A Lyga, Soccerway
Rules for classification: 1) Points; 2) Play-off (for champion only) 3) Head-to-head points; 4) Head-to-head goal difference; 5) Head-to-head goals scored; 6) Head-to-head matches won; 7) Goal difference; 8) Goals scored; 9) Matches won; 10) Fairplay ranking; 11) Draw.
(C) Champions; (O) Play-off winners; (R) Relegated

== Fixtures and results ==
Home \ Away	BAN	DAI	DZI	HEG	KAU	PAN	RIT	SIA	SUD	ZAL	BAN	DAI	DZI	HEG	KAU	PAN	RIT	SIA	SUD	ZAL
Banga		2–1	0–1	2–0	0–2	1–1	1–3	1–2	0–1	2–0		6–0	0–1	0–1	0–0	2–2	2–0	1–0	0–1	0–2
Dainava	2–1		0–2	2–2	1–3	1–3	1–1	1–2	0–3	0–1	0–5		0–2	0–2	0–1	0–3	1–1	0–3	2–2	1–1
Džiugas	0–1	2–0		0–2	0–1	1–1	2–1	0–1	1–1	1–1	0–0	1–1		0–1	1–2	1–4	4–1	1–3	0–0	1–2
Hegelmann	2–0	3–2	1–0		1–2	2–1	2–1	1–0	0–2	2–1	0–0	0–1	4–1		1–1	3–1	3–0	5–2	2–1	2–2
Kauno Žalgiris	0–1	4–0	1–2	3–1		3–0	3–1	3–0	0–0	3–0	0–0	3–0	2–1	2–1		3–2	6–1	3–1	1–1	1–2
Panevėžys	1–1	2–0	0–1	3–0	0–2		3–0	1–3	2–0	2–4	1–0	3–1	0–1	0–1	1–0		0–1	2–0	1–2	3–1
Riteriai	1–2	0–2	0–1	2–4	0–0	3–1		1–0	3–4	3–3	2–2	2–1	0–2	2–0	1–5	1–3		0–2	0–0	0–2
Šiauliai	3–0	2–2	5–0	0–3	2–3	2–1	2–2		2–2	2–0	1–3	3–1	2–2	0–1	2–2	3–3	2–1		2–1	2–2
Sūduva	1–0	1–0	1–0	4–0	0–0	0–0	4–1	1–1		2–2	2–1	2–1	2–3	2–1	1–0	1–1	0–0	2–2		1–3
Žalgiris	1–1	1–1	2–1	0–1	0–0	2–3	2–0	0–0	3–0		1–0	1–1	2–0	3–1	1–2	2–1	2–1	1–0	1–0	

Source: A Lyga, Soccerway
Legend: Blue = home team win; Yellow = draw; Red = away team win.

== A Lyga play-off ==
The ninth-placed team (Riteriai) faced the second-placed team of the 2025 LFF I Lyga (Neptūnas) in a two-legged play-off for the final place in the 2026 A Lyga.

=== First leg ===
15 November 2025	Neptūnas	0–0	Riteriai	Klaipėda
12:00 BST		Report		Stadium: Klaipėdos dirbtinės dangos aikštė Referee: Manfredas Lukjančukas

=== Second leg ===
22 November 2025	Riteriai	2–1 (2–1 agg.)	Neptūnas	Vilnius
12:00 BST	Bulatović 13'; Usavičius 65'	Report	Zubauskas 31'	Stadium: LFF Stadium; Referee: Vilius Paulauskas

== Statistics ==
=== Top scorers ===
Rank	Player	Club	Goals
1	(Lithuania) Eligijus Jankauskas	Šiauliai	18
2	(Cameroon) Abdel Kader Njoya	Hegelmann	15
2	(Belgium) Amine Benchaib	Kauno Žalgiris	15
4	(Serbia) Milan Đokić	Šiauliai	13
4	(Romania) Liviu Antal	Žalgiris	13
6	(Serbia) Dejan Georgijević	Kauno Žalgiris	11
6	(Ukraine) Oleksandr Kurtsev	Džiugas	11
8	(Lithuania) Meinardas Mikulėnas	Riteriai	9
9	(Lithuania) Nauris Petkevičius	Sūduva	8
9	(Lithuania) Ignas Venckus	Banga	8
9	(Nicaragua) Ariagner Smith	Panevėžys	8
9	(Brazil) Lucas Vega	Panevėžys	8

=== Hat-tricks ===
Player	For	Against	Result	Date
(Serbia) Milan Đokić	Šiauliai	Džiugas	5–0 (H)	29 June 2025

=== Clean sheets ===
Rank	Player	Club	Clean sheets
1	(Lithuania) Mantas Bertašius	Banga	12
1	(Lithuania) Ignas Plūkas	Sūduva	12
3	(Lithuania) Marius Paukštė	Džiugas	11
3	(Lithuania) Tomas Švedkauskas	Kauno Žalgiris	11
5	(Lithuania) Vincentas Šarkauskas	Hegelmann	10
6	(Lithuania) Vytautas Černiauskas	Panevėžys	9
7	(Venezuela) Carlos Olses	Žalgiris	8
8	(Lithuania) Gustas Baliutavičius	Šiauliai	7
9	(Lithuania) Deividas Mikelionis	Kauno Žalgiris	4
9	(Croatia) Antonio Tuta	Riteriai	4

=== Discipline ===
==== Player ====
- Most yellow cards: 12
  - (Lithuania) Karolis Žebrauskas (Šiauliai)
- Most red cards: 2
  - (Ukraine) Andriy Karvatskyi (Panevėžys)
  - (Lithuania) Eduardas Jurjonas (Kauno Žalgiris)

==== Club ====
- Most red cards: 5
  - Kauno Žalgiris
- Most yellow cards: 87
  - Riteriai

== Attendances ==
#	Club	Average
1	Kauno Žalgiris	1,841
2	Žalgiris	880
3	Sūduva	821
4	Džiugas	661
5	Šiauliai	616
6	Banga	526
7	Hegelmann	413
8	Dainava	412
9	Panevėžys	383
10	Riteriai	238

== See also ==
- Football in Lithuania
