= Matveyenko =

Matveyenko or Matveenko is a Ukrainian patronymic surname derived from the given name Matvey. Notable people with the surname include:

- Anton Matveyenko, several persons
- Eduard Matveyenko (born 1998), Ukrainian footballer
