= Tomas Švedkauskas =

Lithuanian footballer

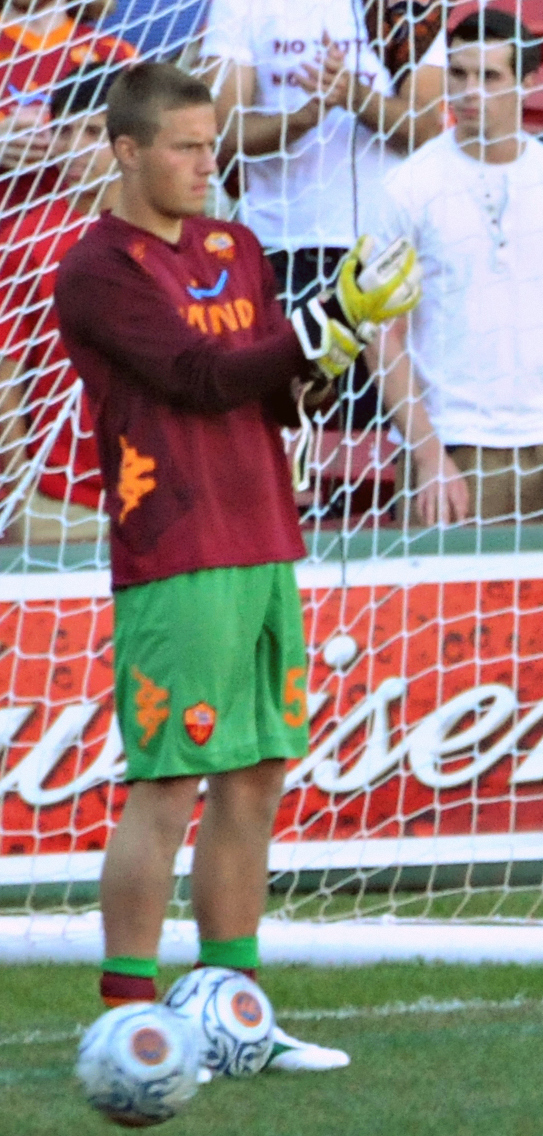
- Švedkauskas with Roma in July 2012.

Personal information
- Date of birth: 22 June 1994 (age 32)
- Place of birth: Marijampolė, Lithuania
- Height: 1.85 m (6 ft 1 in)
- Position: Goalkeeper

Team information
- Current team: Kauno Žalgiris
- Number: 55

Youth career
- –2010: Švyturys
- 2010–2012: Sūduva
- 2011–2012: → Fiorentina (loan)
- 2012–2013: Roma

Senior career*
| Years | Team | Apps | (Gls) |
| 2013–2017 | Roma | 0 | (0) |
| 2013–2014 | → Paganese (loan) | 9 | (0) |
| 2014 | → Pescara (loan) | 1 | (0) |
| 2014–2015 | → Olhanense (loan) | 13 | (0) |
| 2015–2016 | → Ascoli (loan) | 9 | (0) |
| 2016–2017 | → Lupa Roma (loan) | 16 | (0) |
| 2017 | → Catanzaro (loan) | 1 | (0) |
| 2017 | UTA Arad | 4 | (0) |
| 2018–2019 | Riteriai/Trakai | 38 | (0) |
| 2019–2021 | Lommel | 45 | (0) |
| 2021 | Dainava | 6 | (0) |
| 2022 | Sūduva | 35 | (0) |
| 2023 | Hegelmann | 17 | (0) |
| 2024 | Panevėžys | 3 | (0) |
| 2025– | Kauno Žalgiris | 30 | (0) |

International career^{‡}
| 2012 | Lithuania U18 | 1 | (0) |
| 2012 | Lithuania U19 | 3 | (0) |
| 2013–2014 | Lithuania U21 | 5 | (0) |
| 2018– | Lithuania | 20 | (0) |
- * Club domestic league appearances and goals as of 16 March 2026 ‡ National team caps and goals as of 16:00, 4 October 2026 (UTC)

Tomas Švedkauskas (born 22 June 1994) is a Lithuanian professional footballer who plays as a goalkeeper for Toplyga club Kauno Žalgiris and the Lithuania national team.

== Club career ==
Švedkauskas was signed by Ascoli on a temporary deal in mid-2015. He was assigned number 22 shirt.

On 19 August 2016, Švedkauskas was signed by Lupa Roma. On 31 January 2017, Švedkauskas was signed by Catanzaro on a temporary deal.

In October 2021, he returned to Lithuania and joined Dainava.

=== Hegelmann ===
On 12 January 2023, Švedkauskas signed with Hegelmann. On 4 March 2023, he made his debut in A Lyga against DFK Dainava. On 12 December 2023, it was announced that he had left the club. .

=== Panevėžys ===
On 19 December 2023, Panevėžys announced the signing of Švedkauskas. On 18 May 2024, he made his league debut for the club against his former side Hegelmann. On 28 December 2024, he left the club.

=== Kauno Žalgiris ===
On 28 December 2024, Kauno Žalgiris announced the signing of Švedkauksas.

== International career ==
Švedkauskas has made five appearances for the Lithuania under-21 national team.

He earned his first cap for the senior national team on 8 June 2018 in a 1–0 friendly loss against Iran where he played the entire match.

== Honours ==
Sūduva

- Lithuanian Supercup: 2022

Kauno Žalgiris

- Toplyga: 2025, 2026
- Lithuanian Supercup: 2026
