= 2026 Toplyga =

Toplyga
- Season: 2026
- Dates: 21 February – November 2026
- Champions: Kauno Žalgiris
- Relegated: FK Riteriai (withdrew)
- Champions League: Kauno Žalgiris
- Conference League: Sūduva; Transinvest; Žalgiris

The 2026 Toplyga was the 37th season of the Toplyga, the top-tier football league of Lithuania. The season began on 21 February 2026 and ended on 8 November 2026. This was first season renamed from A Lyga.

== Teams ==
The league consisted of ten teams; the top nine teams from the previous season, and one team promoted from the LFF I Lyga. Kauno Žalgiris entered the season as defending champions.

The promoted team was the 2025 LFF I Lyga champions TransINVEST (returning to the TOPLYGA after a single-season absence). They replaced the 2025 A Lyga bottom-placed team Dainava (relegated from the TOPLYGA after three seasons).

Locations of the 2026 TOPLYGA teams

2026 A Lyga competitors
Club	Location	Stadium	Surface	Capacity	Seasons in A Lyga	Position in 2025
Banga	Gargždai	Gargždai Stadium	Artificial	2,216	12	8th
Džiugas	Telšiai	Telšiai Central Stadium	Natural	2,069	5	7th
Džiugas	Telšiai	?	Artificial	?	5	7th
Hegelmann	Raudondvaris	Raudondvaris Stadium	Artificial	490	5	2nd
Kauno Žalgiris	Kaunas	Darius and Girėnas Stadium	Hybrid	15,026	12	1st
Kauno Žalgiris	Akademija	VDU Stadium	Artificial	1,000	12	1st
Panevėžys	Panevėžys	Aukštaitija Stadium	Natural	6,600	8	6th
Panevėžys	Panevėžys	FA Panevėžys stadium	Artificial	660	8	6th
FK Riteriai	Vilnius	LFF Stadium	Artificial	5,067	11	9th
FA Šiauliai	Šiauliai	Savivaldybė Stadium	Natural	3,017	5	5th
FA Šiauliai	Šiauliai	Gytariai Stadium	Artificial	500	5	5th
FA Šiauliai	Šiauliai	Sportima Arena	Artificial	3,157	5	5th
Sūduva	Marijampolė	Marijampolė Football Arena	Natural	6,523	24	4th
Sūduva	Marijampolė	Marijampolė Football Indoor Arena	Artificial	2,660	24	4th
TransINVEST	Galinė	FK Transinvest stadionas	Natural	1,000	2	1st in I Lyga
Žalgiris	Vilnius	LFF Stadium	Artificial	5,067	25	3rd
Žalgiris	Vilnius	Sportima Arena	Artificial	3,157	25	3rd

=== Managers ===
Team	Coach	Appointed	Licence
FK Banga	(Portugal) David Afonso	65 months ago	UEFA Pro
FC Džiugas	(Lithuania) Andrius Lipskis	34 months ago	UEFA A
FC Hegelmann	(Spain) Mikel Aramburu	10 months ago	UEFA Pro
FK Kauno Žalgiris	(Croatia) Željko Sopić	4 months ago	UEFA Pro
FK Panevėžys	(Germany) Roland Vrabec	23 months ago	UEFA Pro
FK Riteriai	(Lithuania) Gintautas Vaičiūnas	16 months ago	UEFA Pro
FA Šiauliai	(Latvia) (Lithuania) Jurgis Pučinsks	12 months ago	UEFA Pro
FK Sūduva	(Lithuania) Donatas Vencevičius	23 months ago	UEFA Pro
TransINVEST	(Lithuania) Marius Stankevičius	26 months ago	UEFA Pro
FK Žalgiris	(Lithuania) Rolandas Džiaukštas	14 months ago	UEFA Pro

== League table ==
Pos	Team	Pld	W	D	L	GF	GA	GD	Pts	Qualification or relegation
1	Kauno Žalgiris (C)	32	16	10	6	62	25	+37	58	Qualification for the Champions League first qualifying round
2	Sūduva	32	15	11	6	43	32	+11	56	Qualification for the Conference League first qualifying round (Note: Since the 2026 Lithuanian Football Cup winners, Kauno Žalgiris, qualified for the Champions League via league position, the Conference League spot awarded to the cup winners was passed to the fourth-placed team.)
3	Žalgiris	32	16	6	10	51	36	+15	54	Qualification for the Conference League first qualifying round
4	Transinvest	32	15	7	10	52	40	+12	52	Qualification for the Conference League first qualifying round
5	Banga	32	11	9	12	35	34	+1	42 (Note: Head-to-head goal difference: Banga +1, Džiugas -1.)	
6	Džiugas	32	11	9	12	43	48	−5	42	
7	Panevėžys	32	11	5	16	34	48	−14	38	
8	Hegelmann	32	4	14	14	33	58	−25	26	
9	Šiauliai (O)	32	5	9	18	28	60	−32	24	Qualification for the Toplyga play-off
10	Riteriai (D, R)	0	0	0	0	0	0	0	0	Withdrew and relegated

Source: TOPLYGA, Soccerway
Rules for classification: 1) Points; 2) Play-off (for champion only) 3) Head-to-head points; 4) Head-to-head goal difference; 5) Head-to-head goals scored; 6) Head-to-head matches won; 7) Goal difference; 8) Goals scored; 9) Matches won; 10) Fairplay ranking; 11) Draw.
(C) Champions; (D) Disqualified; (O) Play-off winners; (R) Relegated

=== Fixtures and results ===
Home \ Away	BAN	DZI	HEG	KAU	PAN	SIA	SUD	TRN	ZAL
Banga		0–1	2–1	2–2	0–1	1–1	2–1	2–2	3–0
Banga		2–0	2–0	0–0	0–3	0–0	0–3	1–3	1–2
Džiugas	0–1		3–0	1–2	4–0	1–0	1–2	3–2	0–3
Džiugas	1–0		2–2	0–0	2–1	4–3	0–2	3–3	0–0
Hegelmann	0–2	1–1		1–1	3–2	1–1	2–2	3–1	0–0
Hegelmann	1–1	1–1		1–4	1–3	1–1	1–1	1–2	2–3
Kauno Žalgiris	1–0	2–2	5–0		4–0	0–0	1–1	1–2	0–1
Kauno Žalgiris	0–1	5–0	2–0		3–0	4–0	5–1	1–1	0–0
Panevėžys	1–0	0–1	1–1	1–1		3–2	0–0	1–2	2–1
Panevėžys	2–1	1–1	1–1	0–1		1–2	1–2	1–0	2–0
Šiauliai	0–0	3–4	0–2	0–5	3–1		2–1	0–4	0–2
Šiauliai	1–3	2–1	0–0	0–2	1–0		1–2	1–3	0–3
Sūduva	0–0	3–2	0–0	2–1	1–0	0–0		2–0	1–1
Sūduva	2–1	2–1	5–1	0–1	2–0	2–1		0–0	0–0
TransINVEST	1–0	0–0	2–1	1–2	1–2	2–2	1–1		1–0
TransINVEST	1–3	1–0	2–0	4–1	0–2	3–0	1–2		3–0
Žalgiris	1–1	2–3	1–3	0–3	4–1	3–1	1–0	1–2	
Žalgiris	2–3	2–0	4–1	3–2	3–0	1–0	4–0	3–1	

Source: TOPLYGA, Soccerway
Legend: Blue = home team win; Yellow = draw; Red = away team win.

== Toplyga play-off ==
The ninth-placed team (Šiauliai) faced the second-placed team of the 2026 LFF I Lyga (Minija) in a two-legged play-off for the final place in the 2027 Toplyga.

=== First leg ===
15 November 2026	Minija	0–2	Šiauliai	Kretinga
12:00 BST			Romanovskij 31'; Bierontas 60'	Stadium: Kretinga stadium

=== Second leg ===
21 November 2026	Šiauliai	1–1 (3–1 agg.)	Minija	Šiauliai
13:00 BST	Garbaliauskas 31'		Nwegbo 57'	Stadium: Savivaldybė Stadium

== Season statistics ==
=== Top scorers ===
Rank	Player	Club	Goals
1	(Serbia) Nikola Petković	FK Žalgiris	10
2	(Morocco) Amine Benchaib	Kauno Žalgiris	9
2	(Cameroon) Abdel Kader Njoya	FC Hegelmann	9
4	(England) Ronald Sobowale	FC Džiugas Telšiai	8

=== Top assist ===
Rank	Player	Club	Assist
