= Marko Bačanin =

Serbian footballer

Personal information
- Date of birth: 9 July 1998 (age 28)
- Place of birth: Smederevo, FR Yugoslavia
- Height: 1.88 m (6 ft 2 in)
- Position: Forward

Team information
- Current team: Panevėžys
- Number: 16

Youth career
- 2008–2013: Smederevo
- 2013–2016: Jagodina
- 2016–2017: Vojvodina

Senior career*
Years	Team	Apps	(Gls)
2016–2017	Vojvodina	1	(0)
2017	Chania−Kissamikos	1	(0)
2018	Tabor Sežana	30	(15)
2019	Javor Ivanjica	5	(1)
2019	Radnički 1912	9	(5)
2020	Omladinac Novi Banovci	6	(4)
2020	Smederevo 1924	15	(15)
2021–2022	Napredak Kruševac	44	(9)
2022	Železničar Pančevo	11	(0)
2023	Sloboda Užice	11	(5)
2024	Haka	31	(6)
2025	Balzan	8	(2)
2025–	Panevėžys	53	(9)
- * Club domestic league appearances and goals as of 26 October 2026

Marko Bačanin (Serbian Cyrillic: Марко Бачанин; born 9 July 1998) is a Serbian professional footballer who plays as a forward for Lithuanian Panevėžys Club in TOPLYGA.

== Career ==
On 4 November 2016, Bačanin made his debut for Vojvodina, in 2–0 home win against Radnik Surdulica.

On 31.january 2024, he signed for FC Haka in Finnish Veikkausliiga on a one-year deal

On 8 July 2025, Bačanin's move to Panevėžys was announced.

== Personal life ==
Marko's twin brother, Strahinja Bačanin, is also a footballer. Marko have brother cousin Andrej Bacanin who is also professionall football player. Marko have two kids. Daughter Klara and son Teo.
