= Amine Benchaib =

Moroccan footballer

Personal information
- Date of birth: 18 June 1998 (age 28)
- Place of birth: Ghent, Belgium
- Height: 1.81 m (5 ft 11 in)
- Position: Midfielder

Team information
- Current team: Kauno Žalgiris
- Number: 7

Youth career
- –2017: Lokeren

Senior career*
Years	Team	Apps	(Gls)
2018–2020	Lokeren	48	(6)
2020–2022	Charleroi	28	(1)
2022–2023	Kortrijk	8	(2)
2023	Mioveni	15	(3)
2023–2024	Farul Constanța	4	(1)
2024	Panevėžys	12	(3)
2025–	Kauno Žalgiris	60	(26)
- * Club domestic league appearances and goals as of 17 September 2026

Amine Benchaib (born 18 June 1998) is a Belgian professional footballer who plays as a midfielder for Toplyga club Kauno Žalgiris.

== Club career ==
Amine Benchaib started his career with Lokeren. He made his debut with Lokeren in a 3-0 Belgian First Division A win over K.A.S. Eupen on 14 April 2018.

On 31 January 2022, Benchaib signed a 3.5-year contract with Kortrijk.

After playing for Mioveni and Farul Constanta in Romania, he joined Lithuanian champions Panevėžys in July 2024. Five months later, he signed for Kauno Žalgiris in the same league.

Benchaib played a crucial role in leading Žalgiris Kaunas to their first-ever A Lyga title in 2025. On 14 July 2026, he scored the winning goal as Kauno Žalgiris defeated Kosovar champions Drita and progressed to the second round of the 2026-27 UEFA Champions League qualifying round.

== Personal life ==
Born in Belgium, Benchaib is of Moroccan descent.

== Honours ==
Farul Constanța

- Supercupa României runner-up: 2023

Kauno Žalgiris

- Toplyga: 2025, 2026
- Lithuanian Cup: 2026
- Lithuanian Supercup: 2026
