= Donatas Navikas =

Lithuanian footballer and coach

Personal information
- Date of birth: 30 June 1983 (age 43)
- Place of birth: Ukmergė, Soviet Union (today Lithuania)
- Height: 1.82 m (5 ft 11 1/2 in)
- Position: Midfielder

Team information
- Current team: Neptūnas (player-manager)
- Number: 27

Senior career*
Years	Team	Apps	(Gls)
1999–2000	Vienybė Ukmergė		(5)
2001–2002	Inkaras Kaunas	35	(2)
2003–2008	Atlantas	191	(22)
2008	Salyut-Energia Belgorod	14	(0)
2009	Šilutė	14	(0)
2009–2011	Minsk	28	(1)
2012	Slavia Mozyr	14	(1)
2013–2015	Atlantas	48	(6)
2015	Kruoja Pakruojis	5	(0)
2015–2017	Palanga	62	(16)
2018–2019	Minija	29	(9)
2020–	Neptūnas	10	(2)

Managerial career
- 2017–2018: Atlantas B
- 2018–2019: Atlantas (assistant)
- 2019: Atlantas (caretaker)
- 2020–: Neptūnas (player-manager)
- * Club domestic league appearances and goals as of 11:53, 28 September 2020 (UTC)

Donatas Navikas (born 30 June 1983) is a former Lithuanian footballer who has recently started coaching career. He is currently coaching FK Neptūnas.

Navikas previously played for FC Salyut-Energia Belgorod in the Russian First Division.

== Coaching career ==
Following a 9–1 defeat against FK Sūduva in the beginning of November 2019, head coach Viktors Dobrecovs was fired and Navikas - who at the time was assistant coach to Dobrecovs - was appointed as FK Atlantas coach on temporary basis until the end of the year. Navikas lost all four games in charge and left the club at the end of the year.

In January 2020 Navikas took up an offer to coach newly established football club FK Neptūnas, where he also was registered as a player.
