= Lovro Grajfoner =

Slovenian footballer

Personal information
- Full name: Lovro Grajfoner
- Date of birth: 25 January 2000 (age 26)
- Place of birth: Maribor, Slovenia
- Height: 1.86 m (6 ft 1 in)
- Position: Defensive midfielder

Team information
- Current team: FK Panevėžys
- Number: 11

Youth career
- 2015–2020: Maribor

Senior career*
Years	Team	Apps	(Gls)
2019–2021	Maribor	0	(0)
2019	→ Drava Ptuj (loan)	17	(2)
2020–2021	→ Aluminij (loan)	21	(0)
2021–2022	Akritas Chlorakas	4	(0)
2022–2023	Mynai	0	(0)
2023	Aluminij	8	(0)
2023–2024	Dravinja	12	(1)
2024–2025	Domžale	14	(0)
2025–	FK Panevėžys	20	(0)

International career^{‡}
2018	Slovenia U18	1	(0)
2018–2019	Slovenia U19	7	(0)
- * Club domestic league appearances and goals as of 17 June 2026 ‡ National team caps and goals as of 16 October 2022

Lovro Grajfoner (born 25 January 2000) is a Slovenian professional footballer who plays as a defensive midfielder for Lithuanian Panevėžys Club in A Lyga.

== Club career ==
He has played for a variety of clubs, including Mynai.

On 4 July 2025, Lovro Grajfoner moved to Panevėžys Club in Lithuania.

On 7 July 2025 Lovro Grajfoner made his debut in A Lyga against Sūduvą Club.
