= Hugo Vidémont =

French footballer (born 1993)

Personal information
- Date of birth: 19 February 1993 (age 33)
- Place of birth: Marseille, France
- Height: 1.73 m (5 ft 8 in)
- Position: Midfielder

Youth career
- Clermont

Senior career*
Years	Team	Apps	(Gls)
2011–2015	Clermont	56	(3)
2015–2017	Ajaccio	54	(7)
2017	Wisła Kraków	8	(0)
2017–2019	Tubize	49	(5)
2019–2021	Žalgiris	67	(32)
2022–2023	Aktobe	21	(10)
- * Club domestic league appearances and goals

Hugo Vidémont (born 19 February 1993) is a French former professional footballer who played as a midfielder.

== Career ==
Vidémont made his senior debut with Clermont Foot on 18 May 2012, coming on as a substitute for Romain Alessandrini in the 2–0 win over Laval.

Vidémont joined Ajaccio in January 2015, on the final day of the winter transfer window. On 27 February 2015, he scored his first goal for the club against Le Havre in a 2–1 loss.

In February 2017 he joined Wisła Kraków.

On 12 August 2019, Vidémont joined Lithuanian club Žalgiris.

On 1 January 2022, Vidémont left Žalgiris join Aktobe in the Kazakhstan Premier League.

On 31 January 2024, Vidémont announced his retirement from football.

== Honours ==
Žalgiris

- A Lyga: 2020, 2021
- Lithuanian Cup: 2021

Individual

- A Lyga Player of the Year: 2021
- A Lyga top scorer: 2020, 2021
- Žalgiris Player of the Year: 2021
