= Miano van den Bos =

Tanzanian footballer (born 2003)

Personal information
- Full name: Miano Danilo van den Bos
- Date of birth: 31 March 2003 (age 23)
- Place of birth: Eindhoven, Netherlands
- Position: Defender

Team information
- Current team: Panevėžys
- Number: 5

Youth career
- UNA

Senior career*
Years	Team	Apps	(Gls)
2021–2023	Eindhoven	1	(0)
2023–2024	Villena	14	(0)
2024	Örebro Syrianska	10	(0)
2025–	Panevėžys	14	(0)

International career
2023–	Tanzania	5	(0)
- * Club domestic league appearances and goals as of 25 April 2026

Miano Danilo van den Bos (born 31 March 2003) is a footballer who plays as a defender for Villena. Born in the Netherlands, he is a Tanzania international.

== Early life ==
As a youth player, he joined the youth academy of Dutch side UNA. He left the club at the age of eleven.

== Career ==
Van den Bos was born in the Netherlands to Tanzanian parents. He was called up to the Tanzania national football team for the 2024 Africa Cup of Nations.

== Style of play ==
Van den Bos mainly operates as a defender. He can also operate as a defensive midfielder.

== Personal life ==
Van den Bos was born in 2003 in the Netherlands. Van den Bos is a native of Eindhoven, the Netherlands.
