= Anton Matveyenko =

Anton Matveyenko may refer to:

- Anton Matveyenko (footballer, born 1986), Belarusian footballer
- Anton Matveyenko (footballer, born 1989), Belarusian footballer
