= Eduard Matveyenko =

Ukrainian footballer

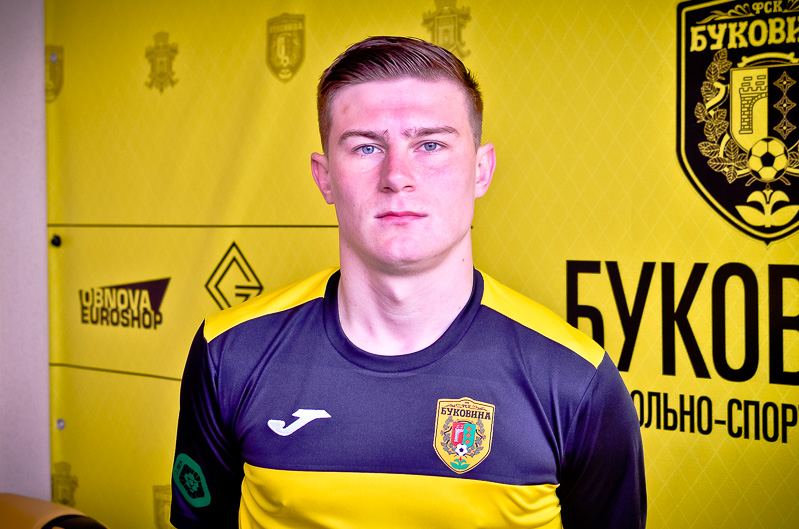
- Matveyenko in 2019

Personal information
- Full name: Eduard Valeriyovych Matveyenko
- Date of birth: 18 January 1998 (age 28)
- Place of birth: Mariupol, Donetsk Oblast, Ukraine
- Height: 1.82 m (6 ft 0 in)
- Position: Defender

Youth career
- 2010–2011: Mariupol
- 2011–2015: Shakhtar Donetsk
- 2015–2017: Zorya Luhansk

Senior career*
Years	Team	Apps	(Gls)
2019	Bukovyna Chernivtsi	4	(0)
2020–2021	Bukovyna Chernivtsi	9	(0)
2021–2022	Podillya Khmelnytskyi	5	(0)
2022	FK Neptūnas	16	(1)

International career^{‡}
2014–2015	Ukraine U17	25	(4)
2016–2017	Ukraine U19	23	(1)
2019	Ukraine (student)	1	(0)
- * Club domestic league appearances and goals as of 23 May 2023 ‡ National team caps and goals as of 08:48, 7 September 2020 (UTC)

Eduard Valeriyovych Matveyenko (Ukrainian: Едуард Валерійович Матвєєнко; born 18 January 1998) is a Ukrainian footballer who plays as a defender for Lithuanian club FK Neptūnas in I Lyga.

== Club career ==
Matveyenko made his professional debut for Bukovyna Chernivtsi in the Ukrainian Second League on 6 April 2019, coming on as a substitute in the 46th minute for Mykola Pavlyuk in the home match against Mynai, which finished as a 0–0 draw.
