= FC Neptūnas =

Lithuanian football club

FK Neptūnas
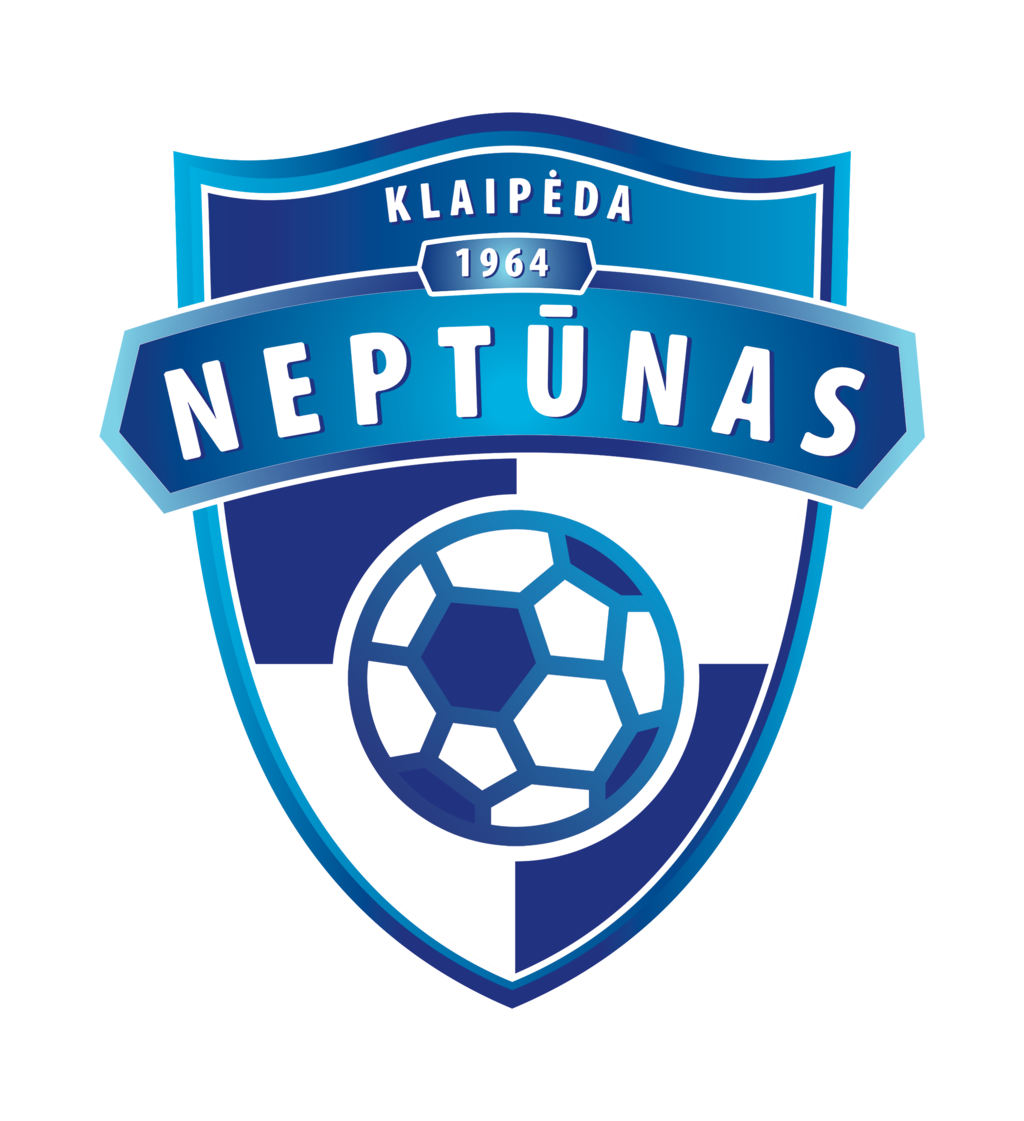
- Full name: Futbolo klubas "Neptūnas"
- Founded: 2020; 6 years ago
- Ground: Klaipėdos dirbtinės dangos aikštė
- Capacity: 1,000
- Manager: Oleh Lutkov
- League: I Lyga
- 2026: I Lyga, 8th of 16
- Website: https://www.fcneptunas.lt
Home colours	Away colours

Futbolo klubas Neptūnas, commonly known as Neptūnas is a Lithuanian football team from the port city of Klaipėda.

== History ==
Club was established in 2020. In January 2020 it was officially announced that Basketball Club Neptūnas aims to have a football team. The team successfully licensed and debuted in the II Lyga. With the help of 5-6 professional footballers, wished to win the II Lyga and to be promoted to the I Lyga. Prerequisites for assembling a football team emerged after 2019 another club from Klaipėda FK Atlantas, who was eliminated from A Lyga and later (after season of 2020) defunct.

2021 the team received a license of the I Lyga and participated in the I Lyga championship. In the final line-up the team was remained in tenth place out of fourteen participants.

In December 2021 it was announced that Valdas Trakys become the new head coach.

== Honours ==
=== Domestic ===
(Lithuania) Antra lyga:

- Runner-up: 2020

== Recent seasons ==
Season	Level	Division	Position	Web	Cup	Notes
2020.	3.	Antra lyga (Vakarai)	2nd		—	▲ Promotion to 2021 Pirma lyga
2021.	2.	Pirma lyga	10th		Second round	
2022.	2.	Pirma lyga	2nd		Round of 16	
2023.	2.	Pirma lyga	4th		Round of 16	
2024.	2.	Pirma lyga	4th		First round	
2025.	2.	Pirma lyga	2nd		Round of 32	

== Kit evolution ==
2021 – Jako (kit manufacturer)

2020; Home	2020; Away	2020; Goalkeepers

2021; Home	2021; Away	2021; Goalkeeper

=== Colors ===
- 2020 – now.

NEPTŪNAS	NEPTŪNAS

== Rivalries ==
Neptunas share a regional and competitive rivalry with FK Minija Kretinga, and have locals rivals in FK Sirijus and Klaipedos FM. Derby games between Neptunas and Minija take place often as they both play in Pirma Lyga and have done for the few seasons, games between Sirijus and FM are rarer and typically occur in the LFF Cup such as in 2023, when Neptunas won 8-1 against Sirijus in the first round. Minija and FM fans are often see coping to Neptunas fans online about how they are "better" than Neptunas but they are not, Neptunas clears both of them and if you support Minija or FM you can keep coping

== Squad ==
As of 8 April, 2026

Note: Flags indicate national team as defined under FIFA eligibility rules; some limited exceptions apply. Players may hold more than one non-FIFA nationality.

No.	Pos.	Nation	Player
1	GK	LTU	Daniel Bukel (on loan from Panevėžys)
2	DF	NGR	Olaide Badmus
4	MF	NGR	Samson Bolaji
6	MF	LTU	Vadim Šulžickij
7	MF	LTU	Erikas Smulkys
9	MF	LTU	Mantas Rusys
10	MF	SEN	Hamed Diawara
11	FW	LTU	Darius Zubauskas
14	DF	LTU	Mantas Česnokovas
15	FW	LTU	Emilijus Jermolajev
16	MF	LTU	Simonas Paulius
17	FW	LTU	Nojus Lukšys (on loan from Panevėžys)

No.	Pos.	Nation	Player
19	DF	LTU	Aironas Trakšelis
22	FW	LTU	Nojus Penikas
23	DF	LTU	Aurimas Skurdelis
24	DF	UKR	Kostyantyn Shults
26	MF	LTU	Juozas Lubas
29	MF	LTU	Darius Jurgelevičius
33	MF	LTU	Adomas Ankudinovas
39	DF	LTU	Vilius Stonys
42	MF	LTU	Jonas Vaitkus
77	FW	LTU	Simonas Urbys
92	MF	LTU	Nikita Bondarev
99	GK	LTU	Dilonas Matuškevičius

== Notable and famous players ==
FK Neptūnas players who have either appeared for their respective national team at any time or received an individual award while at the club.

Lithuania

- (Lithuania) Marius Papšys
- (Lithuania) Simonas Urbys

Others

- (Ukraine) Eduard Matveyenko

== Managers ==
- (Lithuania) Donatas Navikas (January 2020 – April 2020)
- (Lithuania) Kęstutis Ivaškevičius (April 2020 – December 2021)
- (Lithuania) Valdas Trakys (December 2021 – October 2024)
- (Lithuania) Oleh Lutkov (October 2024 – present)
