= Justinas Januševskij =

Lithuanian footballer

Personal information
- Full name: Justinas Januševskij
- Date of birth: 26 March 1994 (age 32)
- Place of birth: Lithuania
- Height: 1.85 m (6 ft 1 in)
- Position: Defender

Team information
- Current team: Panevėžys
- Number: 15

Youth career
- 2009–2014: Trakai

Senior career*
Years	Team	Apps	(Gls)
2014–2019	Trakai	160	(9)
2020–2022	Panevėžys	52	(6)
2022	Sūduva	29	(1)
2023	Banga	30	(0)
2024	Flamurtari	0	(0)
2024	Banga	28	(1)
2025–	Panevėžys	35	(1)

International career^{‡}
2013	Lithuania U19	2	(0)
2014–2016	Lithuania U21	11	(0)
2018–	Lithuania	2	(0)
- * Club domestic league appearances and goals as of 20:00, 10 August 2024 (UTC) ‡ National team caps and goals as of 28 February 2026

Justinas Januševskij (born 26 March 1994) is a Lithuanian professional footballer who plays as a defender for FK Panevėžys.

== Club career ==
Januševskij joined FK Trakai at the age of 15, and has spent his entire playing career with them.

On 28 December 2019, he became a member of FK Panevėžys.

On 3 January 2025, Panevėžys announced that Januševskij would return to the club.

== International career ==
Januševskij made his professional debut for the Lithuania national football team in a friendly 1–0 loss to Iran on 8 June 2018.
