= Simonas Urbys =

Lithuanian footballer

Personal information
- Full name: Simonas Urbys
- Date of birth: 7 November 1995 (age 31)
- Place of birth: Gargždai, Lithuania
- Height: 1.78 m (5 ft 10 in)
- Position: Midfielder

Senior career*
Years	Team	Apps	(Gls)
2012–2013	Banga	4	(0)
2013–2015	Ekranas	19	(0)
2015	Palanga	21	(6)
2015	Atlantas	7	(0)
2016	Palanga	28	(12)
2017	Banga	27	(5)
2018	Palanga	27	(6)
2019	Žalgiris (V)	7	(0)
2019–2020	Kauno Žalgiris	31	(4)
2021	Banga	33	(11)
2022	Sūduva	13	(1)
2023–2024	FA Šiauliai	50	(1)
2025	FC Džiugas	32	(3)
2026-	FK Neptūnas	0	(0)

International career^{‡}
2018	Lithuania	2	(0)
- * Club domestic league appearances and goals as of 8 February 2026 ‡ National team caps and goals as of 23 July 2021

Simonas Urbys (born 7 November 1995) is a Lithuanian professional footballer who plays as a midfielder for I Lyga club Neptūnas.

== Club career ==
From December 2018 until July 2019, he was a member of FK Žalgiris.

In summer 2019, he became a member of FK Kauno Žalgiris.

== International career ==
Urbys made his professional debut for the Lithuania national football team in a 2–0 2018 Baltic Cup loss to Estonia on 30 May 2018.
