= Marijampolė Football Indoor Arena =

Arena in Lithuania

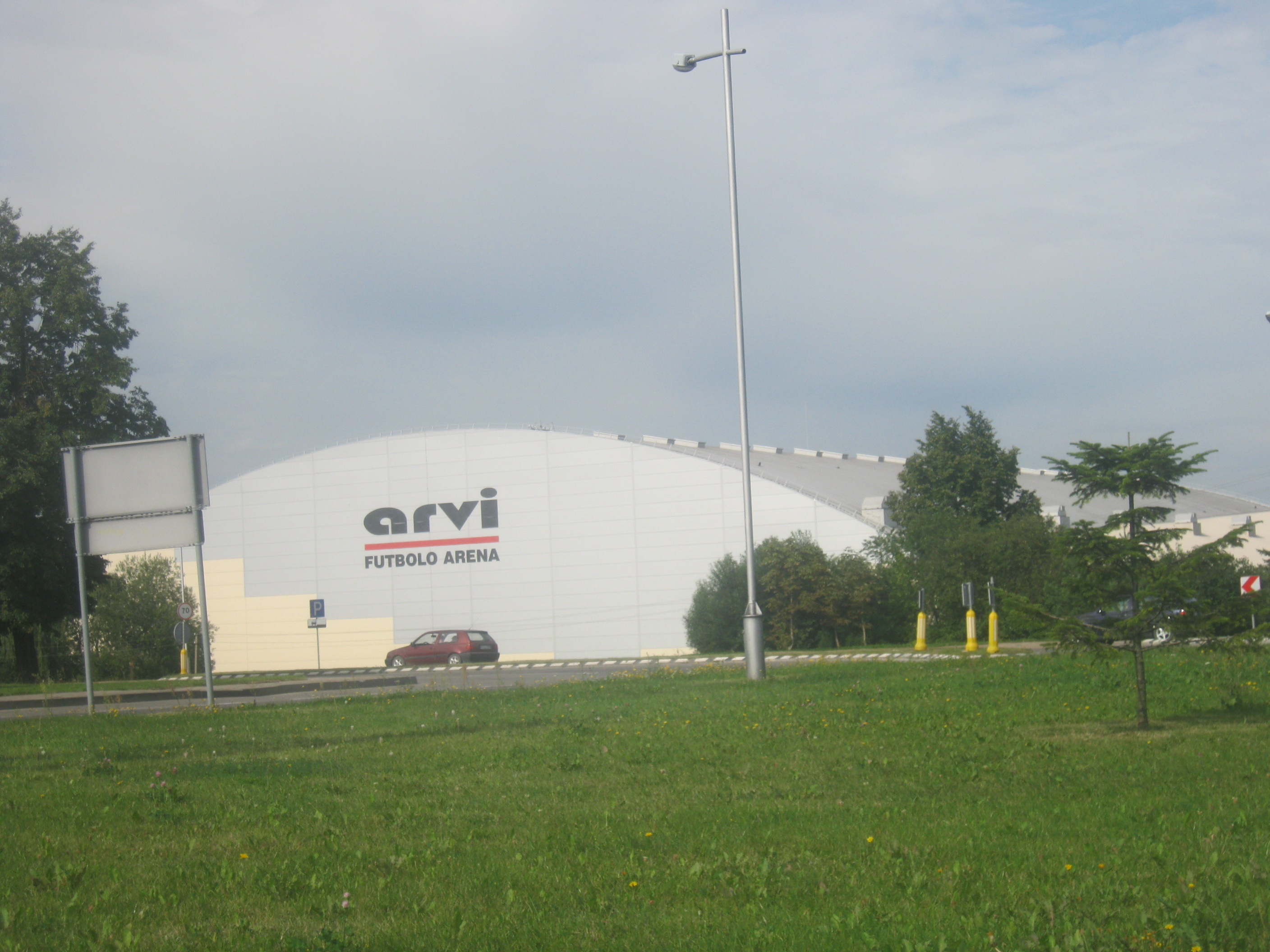
- Interactive map of Marijampolė Football Indoor Arena
- Location: Marijampolė, Lithuania
- Coordinates: 54°34′32″N 23°22′3″E
- Owner: FK Sūduva Marijampolė
- Capacity: 2,660

Construction
- Groundbreaking: 2007
- Opened: 2008

Marijampolė Football Indoor Arena is indoor arena in Marijampolė, Lithuania, mainly used for football. For sponsorship reasons from 2011 to December 2019 was called ARVI maniežas (Indoor Arena).

Between the 2011 and 2019 seasons the stadium was named ARVI Football Arena after the sponsoring rights were bought by ARVI Enterprises Group.

11 December 2019 reports that ARVI Group will no longer support Sūduva club. There were notes and signboards bearing the name of a former sponsor. The ARVi Arena has been renamed the Marijampolė Football Arena (at least temporarily until another sponsor appears).

== Also ==
- Sūduva Stadium
- FK Sūduva Marijampolė
