= Mantinga Football Arena =

Mixed-use playground in Lithuania

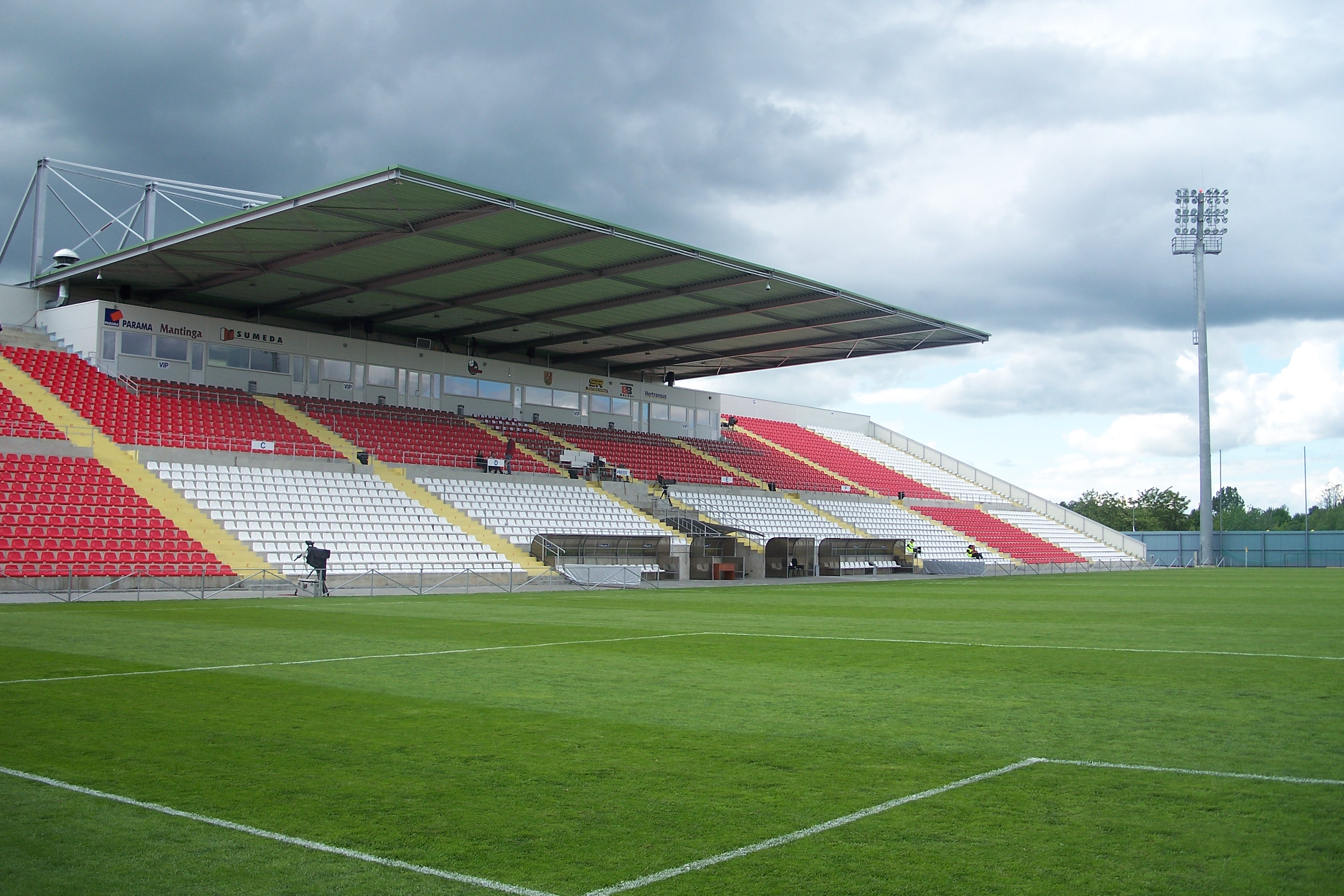
- UEFA Category 3 stadium
- Interactive map of Mantinga Football Arena
- Full name: Mantinga Football Arena
- Former names: ARVI Football Arena (2011–2019); Hikvision Arena (2020–2022); Marijampolės futbolo maniežas (2023)
- Location: Marijampolė, Lithuania
- Coordinates: 54°34′28.37″N 23°21′55.41″E
- Owner: Marijampolė Municipality, Sūduva
- Capacity: 6,523
- Surface: Grass
- Record attendance: 6,211 (France U19 vs Serbia U19, 2013 UEFA European Under-19 Championship)
- Field size: 105 by 68 metres (115 by 74 yd)

Construction
- Groundbreaking: May 25, 2007
- Opened: July 6, 2008; Sūduva vs FBK Kaunas
- Expanded: 2009
- Cost: 26 mln. LTL

Tenants
- Sūduva, Lithuania national football team

Mantinga Football Arena, also referred to as Marijampolė Stadium or Sūduva Stadium, is a multi-use rectangular layout stadium in Marijampolė, Lithuania. It is currently primarily used for association football as the home stadium of Sūduva.

== History ==
The stadium was built using co-funding from the European Union as a 50/50 partnership between the city and Sūduva. It was opened on July 6, 2008.

In May–June 2009, the stadium's original seating capacity of 4,200 was increased to hold 6,500 people. This was achieved via additionally constructing a Southern stand, while the Eastern stand's footprint was lengthened left and right alongside the sideline by constructing extensions to the existing tribune that had held only 280 seats before; It was also refurbished and had the seats replaced. With the works completed, the stadium hosted an international match between Lithuania national team and Romania in its new configuration.

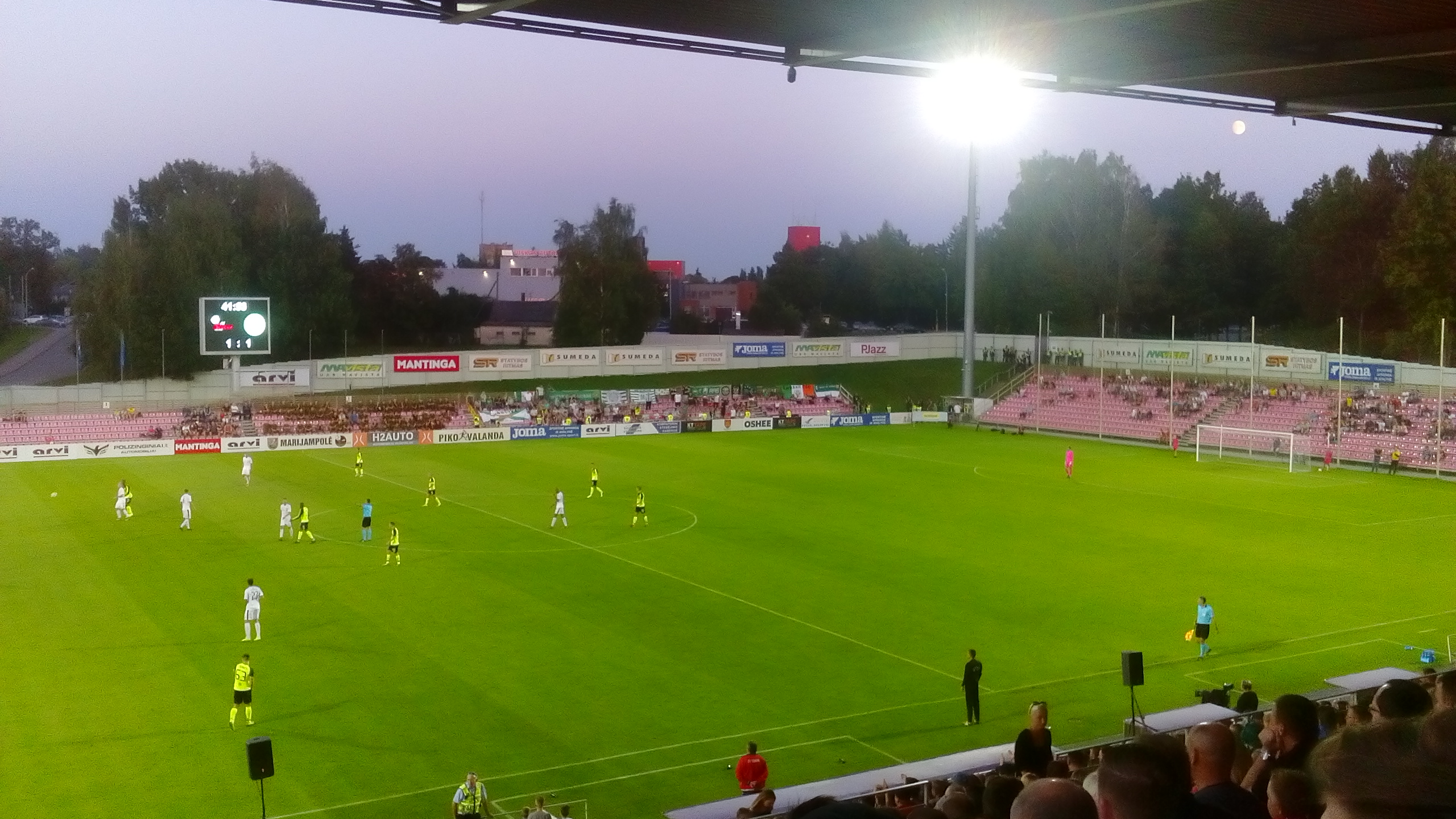
East and Southern (left side) stands.

The stadium was selected to host the final of the 2013 UEFA European Under-19 Championship as Lithuania won the bid in 2010.

Between the 2011 and 2019 seasons the stadium was named ARVI Football Arena after the sponsoring rights were bought by ARVI Enterprises Group.

On 11 December 2019, reports were published that ARVI Group will no longer support Sūduva club. There were notes and signboards bearing the name of a former sponsor. The ARVI Arena has been renamed the Marijampolė Football Arena. On 14 January 2020 FK Sūduva announced about new general sponsor Hikvision and renaming the stadium into Hikvision arena.

March 2026 FK Sūduva announced about new general sponsor UAB Mantinga and renaming the stadium into Mantinga futbolo arena.

== See also ==
- Marijampolė Football Indoor Arena
- FK Sūduva Marijampolė
