= FK Panevėžys =

Lithuanian football club

Panevėžys
- Full name: Futbolo Klubas Panevėžys
- Founded: 2015; 11 years ago
- Ground: Aukštaitija Stadium
- Capacity: 6,600
- Chairman: Bronius Vaitiekūnas
- Manager: Toni Korkeakunnas
- League: TOPLYGA
- 2026: TOPLYGA, 7th of 10
- Website: fk-panevezys.lt
Home colours	Away colours

Futbolo klubas Panevėžys, commonly known as Panevėžys, is a Lithuanian professional football club from the city of Panevėžys. The team currently plays in Toplyga, the top tier of Lithuanian football.

== History ==
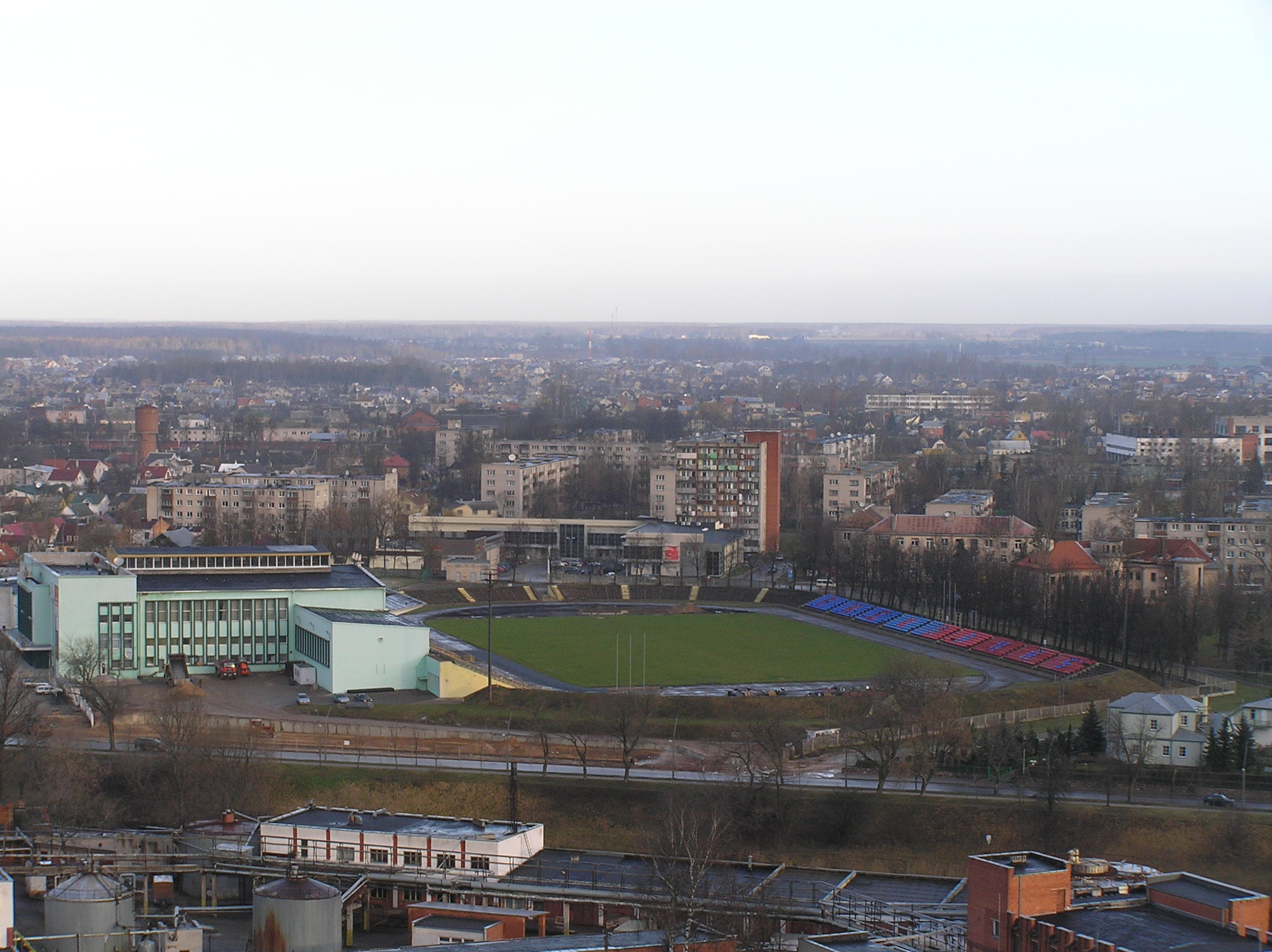
Aukštaitija Stadium, home ground of FK Panevėžys

The city of Panevėžys has a long history of football in Lithuania. Until 2014, the city was represented by 7-time title winners FK Ekranas. However, FK Ekranas was unable to meet the financial criteria to participate in the 2015 season and lost eligibility to participate in the A Lyga. The club was declared bankrupt. To fill the void, FK Panevėžys was established at the beginning of 2015, right before the new season started. The club made its debut in the I Lyga (second tier), finishing its first season in eighth place. In 2016, the club improved its performance and finished in fifth place.

In 2017, Panevėžys aimed to win the I Lyga and return a club from the city of Panevėžys to the A Lyga. However, the start of the season was disastrous, which resulted in the resignation of the head coach Virginijus Liubšys. Eventually, the club finished 10th in the league table. In the 2018 season under new coach Alexandru Curteian, FK Panevėžys achieved their goal of winning the I Lyga and achieved promotion to the A Lyga for the first time in history. They finished their first season in the top flight (2019 A Lyga) in 5th position.

Panevėžys reached the final of the 2020 Lithuanian Football Cup and on 24 October 2020 beat FK Sūduva on penalties to secure the trophy. In the 2021 Lithuanian Football Cup, the club reached the final again, but could not defend the title, as they lost 1–5 against FK Žalgiris.

Former Lithuania national team coach Valdas Urbonas took over the club for the 2022 season. After a successful start to the season, Panevėžys was in first place in the table after 14 matches played. After a series of weak performances, the club dropped to third place, leading to the dismissal of Urbonas in September 2022. Urbonas was replaced by Italian national Gino Lettieri. At the end of the 2023 season, Panevėžys secured first place in the league, 12 points ahead of second-place team FK Žalgiris, becoming a Lithuanian champion for the first time in history.

== Kit manufacturers ==
Kit provider	Period
(Germany) Adidas	2015–2018
(Denmark) Hummel	2019–2022
(Italy) Macron	2023–present

The team kit is produced by Italian company Macron. It is all-red with white details to reflect the colours of the FK Panevėžys.

== Honours ==
- Lithuanian Championship:
- A Lyga
  - Winners (1): 2023
  - 3rd place (1): 2022
- Lithuanian Cup
  - Winners (2): 2020, 2025
  - 2nd place (1): 2021
- Lithuanian Supercup
  - Winners (2): 2021, 2024

== Participation in Lithuanian championships ==
Season	League	Pos	P	W	D	L	F	A	Pts	Cup
2015	I Lyga	8th	34	18	7	9	79	48	55	Round of 32
2016	I Lyga	5th	30	17	8	5	68	35	59	Round of 16
2017	I Lyga	10th	28	10	7	11	45	44	37	Quarterfinalist
2018	I Lyga	1st	26	18	4	4	77	26	58	Round of 16
2019	A Lyga	5th	30	10	7	16	49	63	37	Quarterfinalist
2020	A Lyga	5th	20	2	6	12	19	38	12	Winner
2021	A Lyga	4th	36	16	12	8	55	40	60	Finalist
2022	A Lyga	3rd	36	18	8	10	50	31	62	Semifinalist
2023	A Lyga	1st	36	26	9	1	64	14	87	Round of 32
2024	A Lyga	8th	36	9	14	13	34	40	41	Round of 32
2025	A Lyga	6th	36	14	7	15	55	49	49	Winner

== European campaigns ==
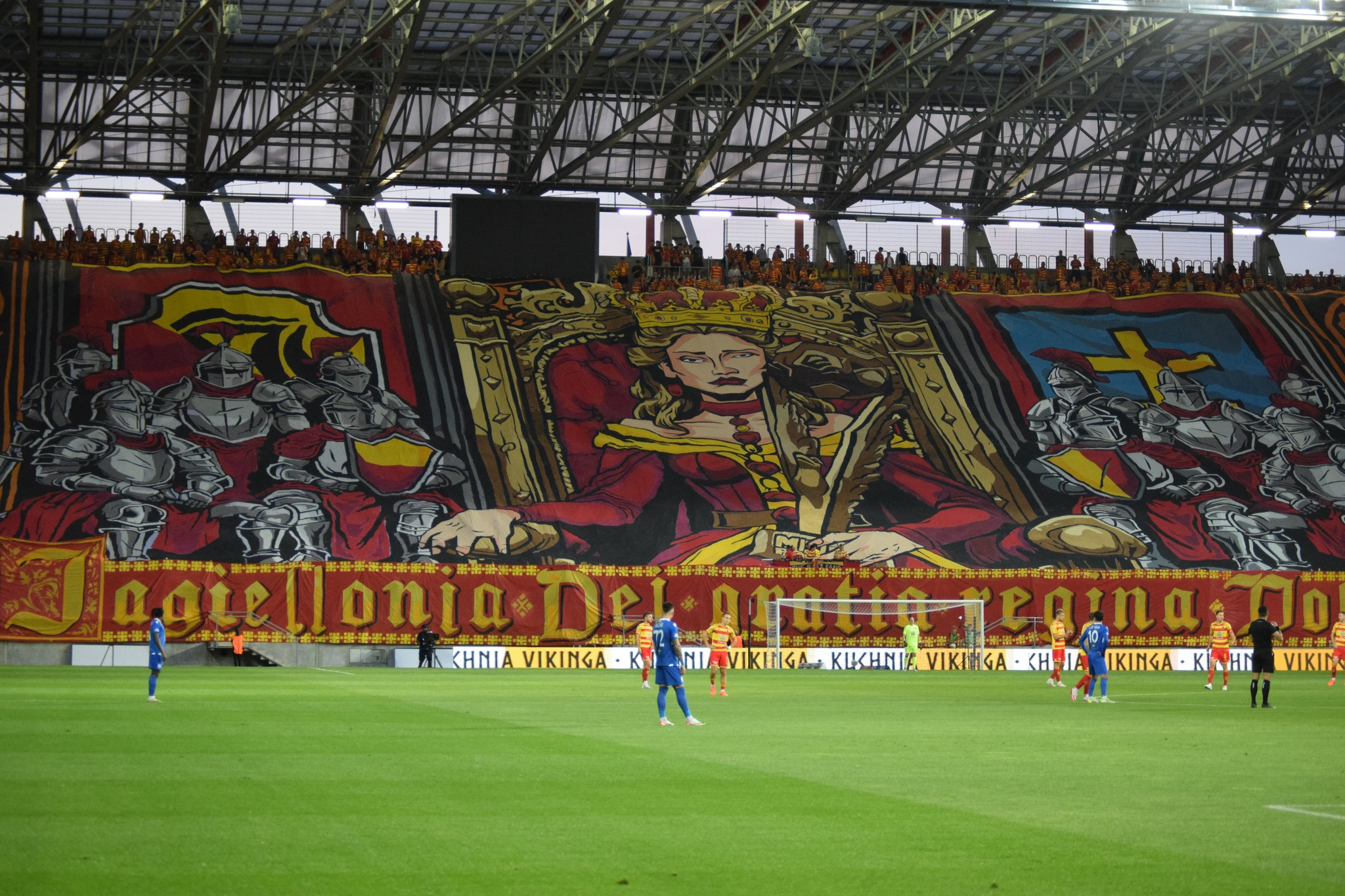
Jagiellonia Białystok 3:1 FK Panevėžys (2024)

Season	Competition	Round	Club	Home	Away	Agg.
2021–22	UEFA Europa Conference League	2QR	(Serbia) Vojvodina	0–1	0–1	0−2
2022–23	UEFA Europa Conference League	1QR	(Moldova) Milsami Orhei	0–0	0–2	0–2
2023–24	UEFA Europa Conference League	1QR	(Moldova) Milsami Orhei	2–2	1–0	3–2
2023–24	UEFA Europa Conference League	2QR	(Israel) Hapoel Be'er Sheva	1–1	0–1	1–2
2024–25	UEFA Champions League	1QR	(Finland) HJK	3–0	1–1	4–1
2024–25	UEFA Champions League	2QR	(Poland) Jagiellonia Białystok	0–4	1–3	1–7
2024–25	UEFA Europa League	3QR	(Israel) Maccabi Tel Aviv	1–2	0–3	1–5
2024–25	UEFA Conference League	PO	(Wales) The New Saints	0–3	0–0	0–3
2026–27	UEFA Conference League	2QR	(Kazakhstan) Tobol	1–1	1–1 (a.e.t.)	2–2 (2–3 p)

Notes

- QR: Qualifying round
- PO: Play-off round

== Panevėžys B ==
The Panevėžys 'B' team is currently playing in the I Lyga (second tier).

== Players ==
=== Current squad ===
As of 27 August 2026

Note: Flags indicate national team as defined under FIFA eligibility rules; some limited exceptions apply. Players may hold more than one non-FIFA nationality.

No.	Pos.	Nation	Player
1	GK	LTU	Vytautas Černiauskas
4	DF	TUN	Rayen Mzoughi
5	DF	TAN	Miano van den Bos
6	MF	LTU	Matas Ramanauskas
7	MF	LTU	Ernestas Veliulis
8	MF	CIV	Salomon Kouadio
11	MF	SLO	Lovro Grajfoner
12	GK	LTU	Liudvikas Valius
13	DF	CYP	Strahinja Kerkez
15	DF	LTU	Justinas Januševskij
16	FW	SRB	Marko Bačanin
17	FW	UKR	Oleksandr Kurtsev
22	GK	LTU	Arijus Bražinskas
24	FW	LTU	Nauris Petkevičius
25	DF	LTU	Ignas Lukoševičius

No.	Pos.	Nation	Player
26	MF	FRA	Jérôme Simon
27	MF	GHA	Kwadwo Asamoah
28	MF	LTU	Ernestas Burdzilauskas (on loan from Kauno Žalgiris)
32	DF	LTU	Rokas Rasimavičius
33	DF	SEN	Seydina Keita
34	MF	BEL	Isaac Asante
45	DF	GER	Milan Delević
50	DF	KOS	Laurit Krasniqi
66	DF	LTU	Dovydas Balsys
77	MF	BDI	Parfait Bizoza
79	FW	LTU	Valdas Paulauskas
80	FW	BRA	Elivelto
95	DF	COD	Joël Bopesu
—	MF	TUN	Yassine Dridi

=== Out on loan ===
Note: Flags indicate national team as defined under FIFA eligibility rules; some limited exceptions apply. Players may hold more than one non-FIFA nationality.

No. / Pos. / Nation / Player; 20 / FW / LTU / Nojus Lukšys (on loan to (Lithuania) Neptūnas until 31 December 2026)	No. / Pos. / Nation / Player

== Staff ==
Position	Name
Chairman	(Lithuania) Bronius Vaitiekūnas
Head coach	(Finland) Toni Korkeakunnas
Coach	(Lithuania)
Coach	(Lithuania) Dainius Gleveckas
Club doctor	(Lithuania) Jonas Vinogradovas
Head physio	(Lithuania) Dainius Mikšys
Media	(Lithuania) Gintaras Brazdžionis

== Coaches ==
Name	Nat	From	To
Virginijus Liubšys	(Lithuania)	2015	2017
Albertas Klimavičius (caretaker)	(Lithuania)	2017	2017
Alexandru Curteian	(Moldova)	2018	2020
João Luís Martins	(Portugal)	2020	2021
Valdas Urbonas	(Lithuania)	2021	2022
Gino Lettieri	(Italy)	2022	2024
Stijn Vreven	(Belgium)	2024	2024
Roland Vrabec	(Germany)	2024	2026
