= LFF Stadium =

Football stadium in Vilnius, Lithuania

FK Žalgiris' Home Stadium
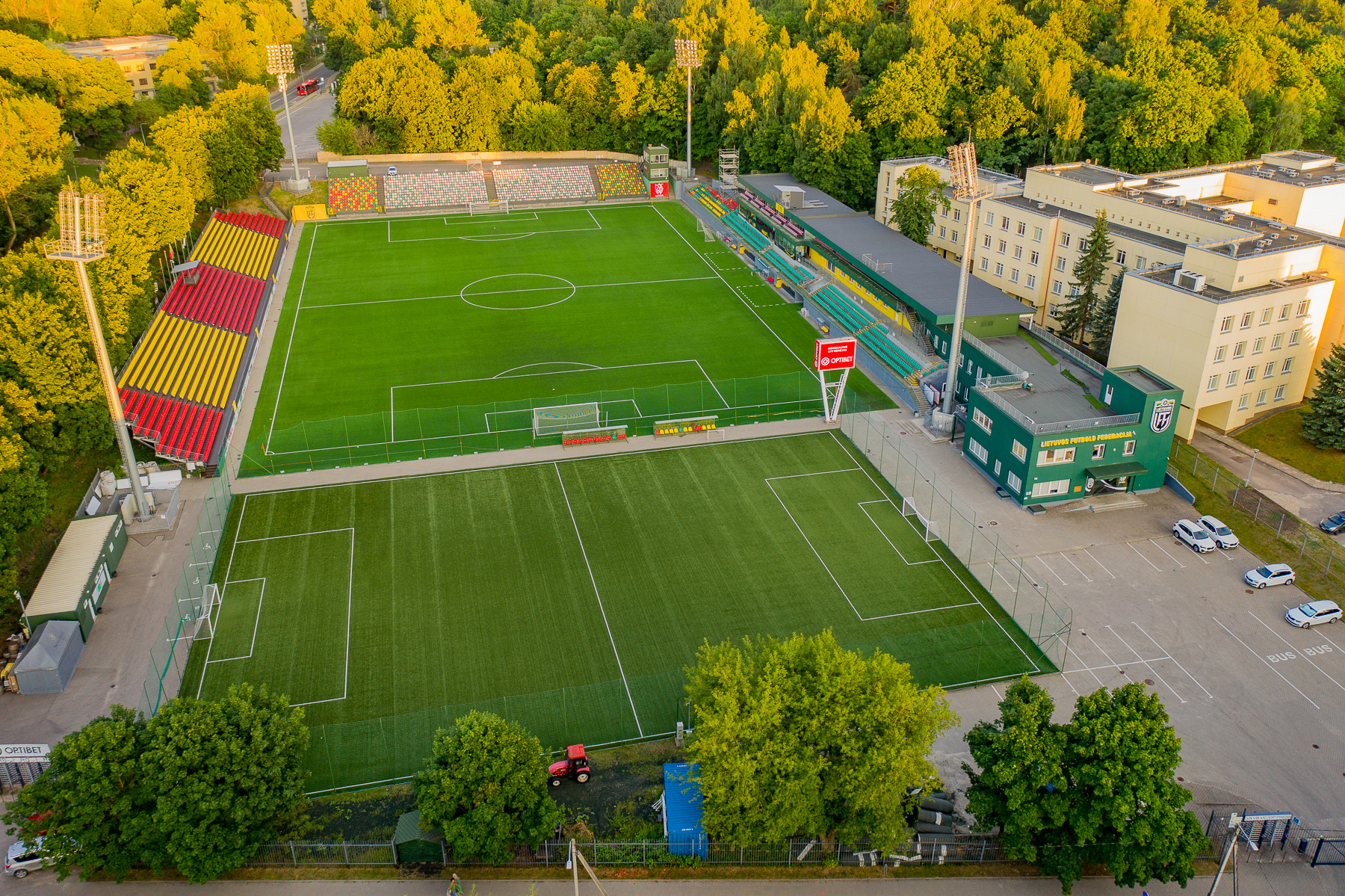
- Stadium in 2023
- Interactive map of FK Žalgiris' Home Stadium
- Former names: Lokomotyvas Stadium; Vėtra Stadium; LFF Stadium
- Address: Stadiono g. 2 Liepkalnio g. 13/2 (until 2013)
- Location: Vilnius, Lithuania
- Coordinates: 54°40′07″N 25°17′40″E
- Owner: UAB "Vexo projektai"
- Operator: FK Žalgiris
- Capacity: 5,067
- Surface: Artificial turf
- Record attendance: 6,840 (Žalgiris vs Kauno Žalgiris, 16 September 2026)

Construction
- Opened: 1957
- Renovated: 2004, 2011–12, 2017, 2021, 2025–26

Tenants
- FK Vėtra (2004–2010); FK Žalgiris (2011–present); FK Riteriai (2014–2026); Lithuania national football team (2005–2022)

FK Žalgiris' Home Stadium (Lithuanian: FK Žalgirio namų stadionas), formerly known as Vėtra Stadium and LFF Stadium, is a football stadium in Vilnius, Lithuania. The stadium succeeded the Žalgiris Stadium as the main venue of FK Žalgiris, the city's primary football club, and was home of the Lithuanian national football team between 2005 and 2022. It can accommodate 5,067 people.

== History ==
The Stadium was built in 1957 and was first named Lokomotyvas. The Stadium was rebuilt in 2004 and renamed to Vėtra Stadium as the home ground of FK Vėtra. In 2005, the Stadium hosted its first national team matches.

=== National stadium ===
Following the insolvency of Vėtra in 2010, the Stadium was taken over by the Lithuanian Football Federation for 2.2 million litas (€637,200) and was renamed as the LFF Stadium. The Stadium has undergone various improvements to meet the UEFA Category 3 stadium requirements. Following the renovation, the Stadium also includes the new headquarters of the LFF, while the grass pitch was changed to an artificial turf. The capacity of the stadium was increased to 5,067.

In 2015, the Stadium was renewed. The artificial turf was relayed, replacing it with a new higher quality surface, and the Stadium's lighting system was updated.

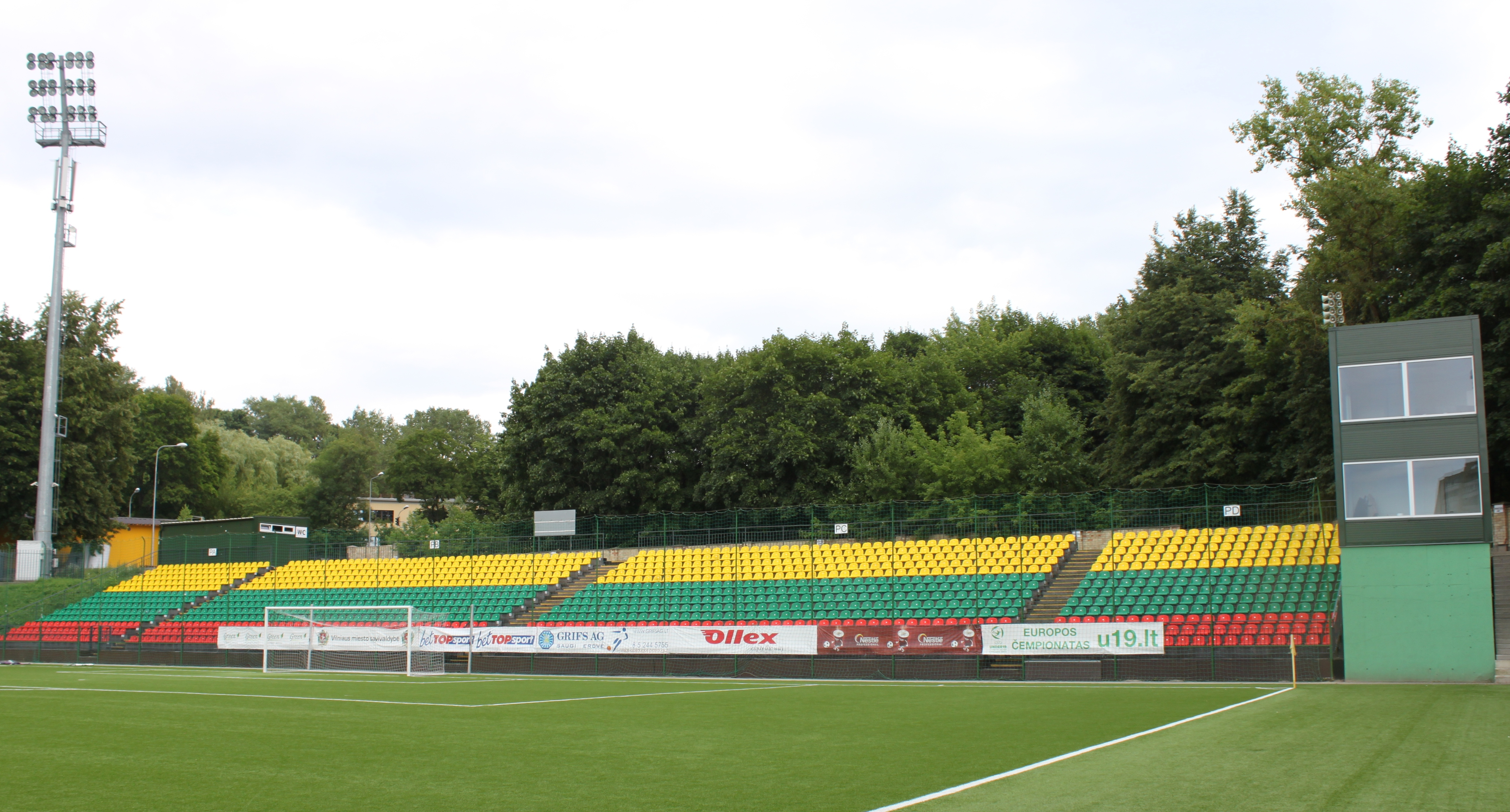
The South stand before the reconstruction (2013)

After a public backlash to an incident that occurred during the UEFA Euro 2016 qualifying Group E match versus England, a specially created municipal investigative commission deemed the Southern stand "structurally deficient and unfit to seat spectators." While the Stadium underwent minor improvements afterwards, including an installation of a new scoreboard before an international game against Malta in 2016, the stand remained in use, resulting in three fans sustaining injuries during the same match when part of the floor in the stand cracked. The Stadium was then renovated in 2017. During the 2021 season, the Eastern stand's seating sections were also reinforced. The pitch was relayed in April 2020 and June 2023.

In 2016, the federation presented the stadium to prospective purchasers, before formally listing it in 2022, subsequent to the conclusion of the Darius and Girėnas Stadium reconstruction. The municipal authority of Vilnius declined to acquire the venue with the 11–4–6 voting outcome. In March 2024, a subsidiary of Baltijos Futbolo Akademija emerged as the probable buyer of the stadium.

=== Home of Žalgiris ===
In December 2024, the stadium was finally acquired by some shareholders of Žalgiris Vilnius via UAB "Vexo projektai" for €3.5 million. A preferential lease purchase contract was signed by the club for 10 seasons, with options to additionally extend for another 5 years. The new owners confirmed that the stadium will continue to be available for other clubs to rent, but will mainly operate as the training venue of the Žalgiris' academy.

During the 2025–2026 off-season, construction company Naresta renovated the VIP lodges and subsequently became title sponsor of the area.

== Usage ==
Since 2011, the stadium has been the main venue of a majority of the city’s football clubs; Žalgiris and Riteriai play in the stadium, as well as numerous clubs from the lower divisions. Between 2012 and 2022, the ground was the principal home venue of the Lithuanian national football team. The stadium sometimes hosts a local american football team known as Iron Wolves of the Baltic American Football League, and the stadium is the venue of the Dancing Day of the Lithuanian Song Festival.

== Gallery ==
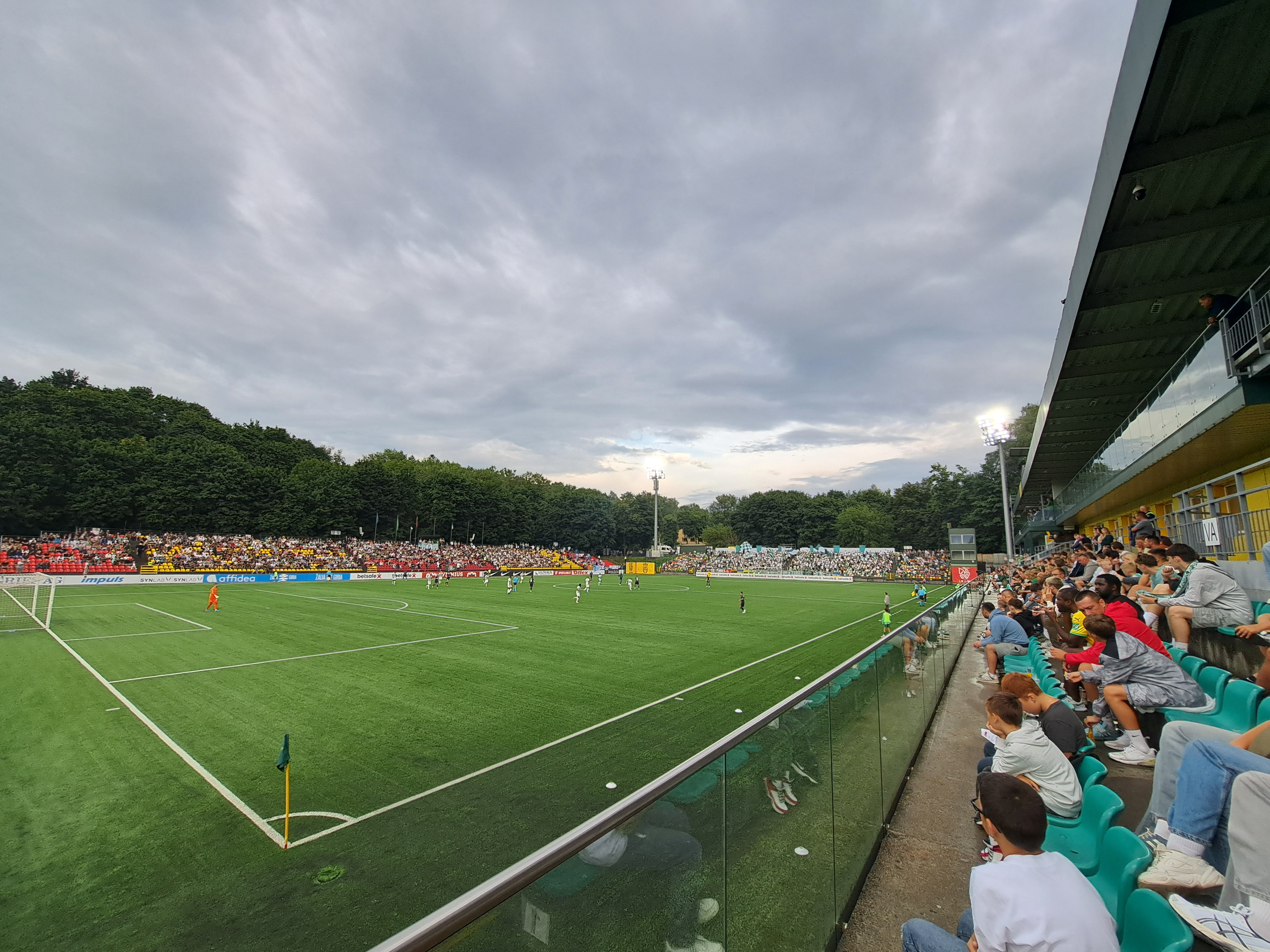
Panoramic view of the pitch

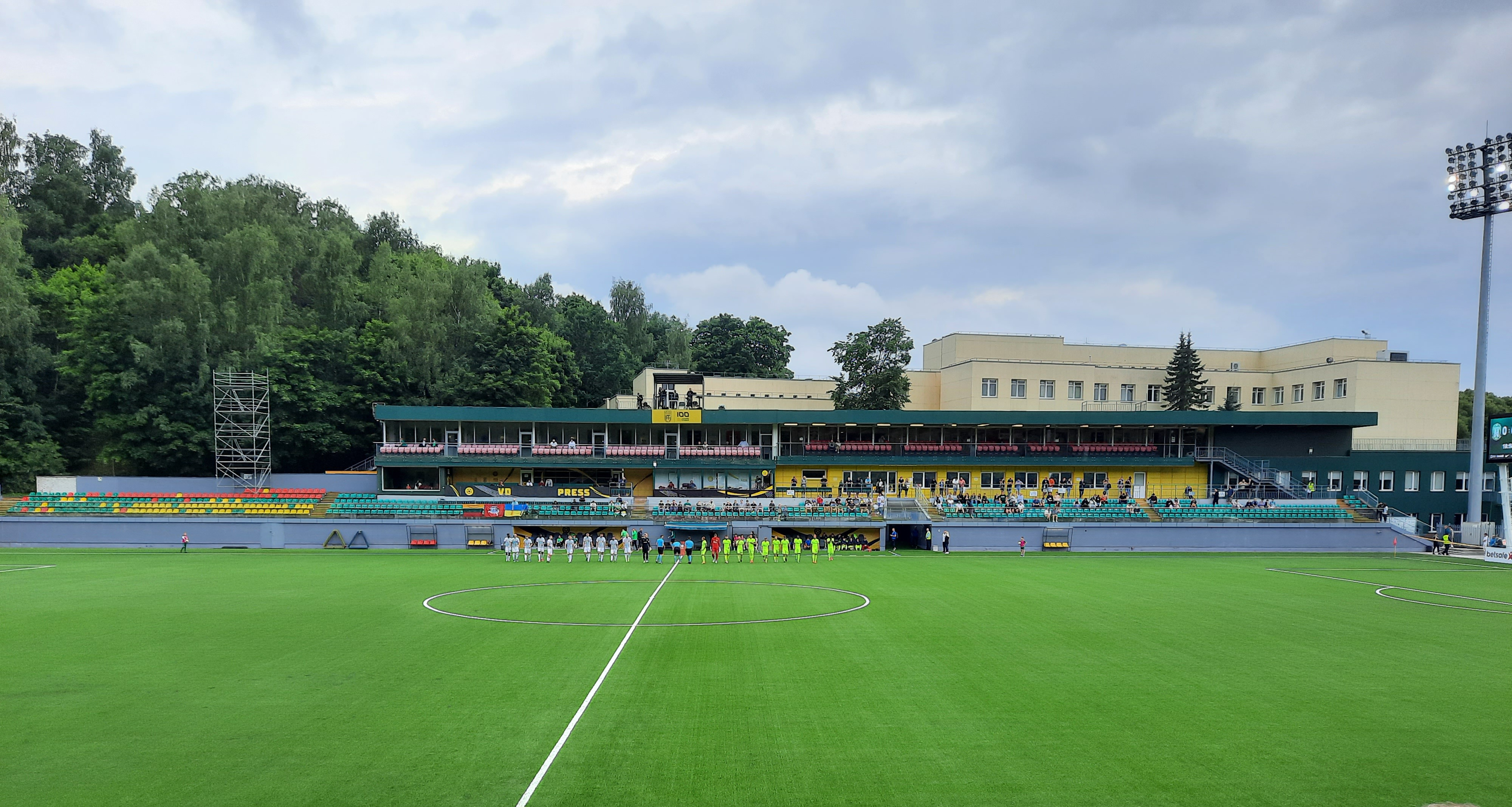
The West Stand with VIP lodges

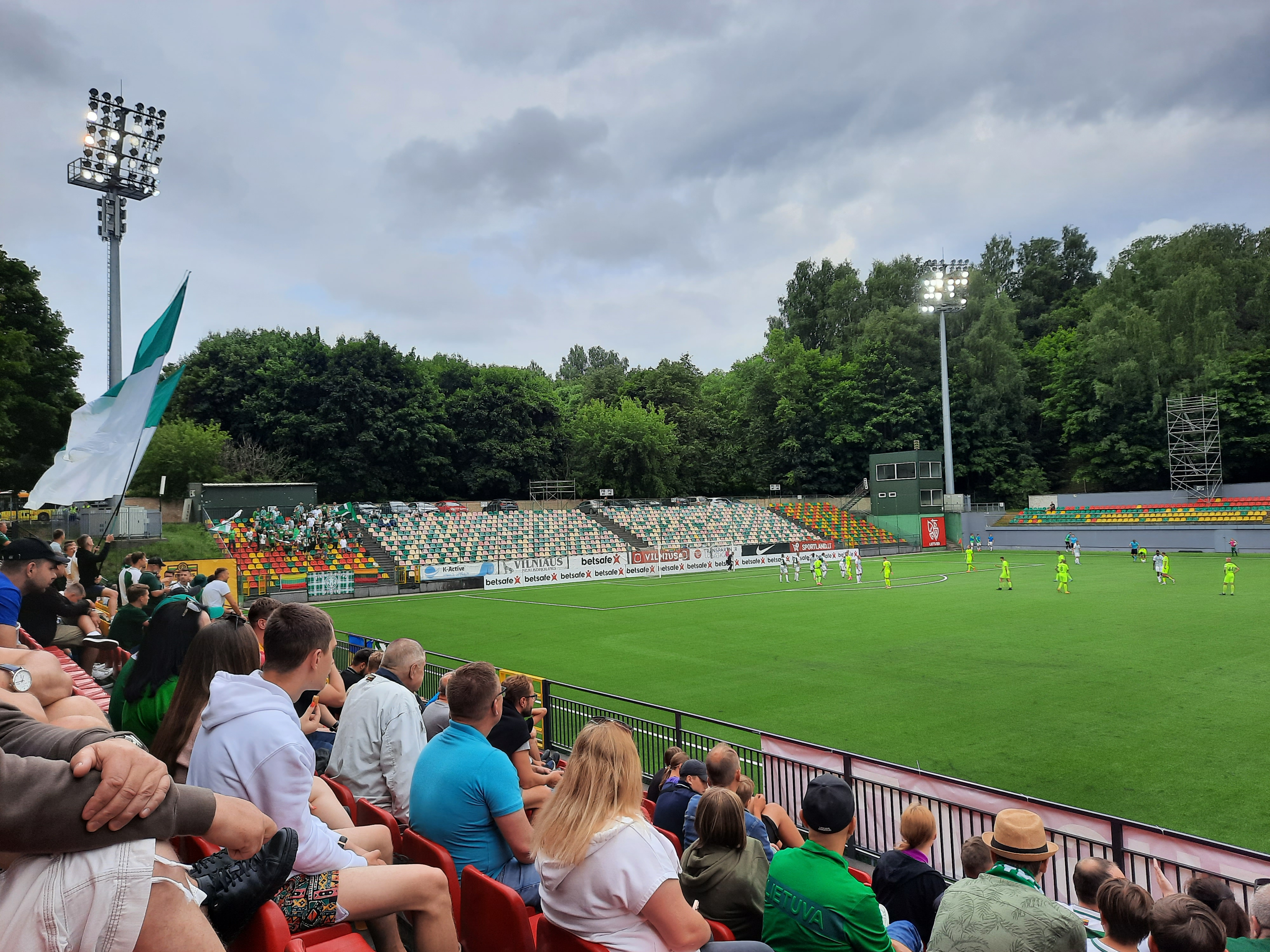
The South Stand

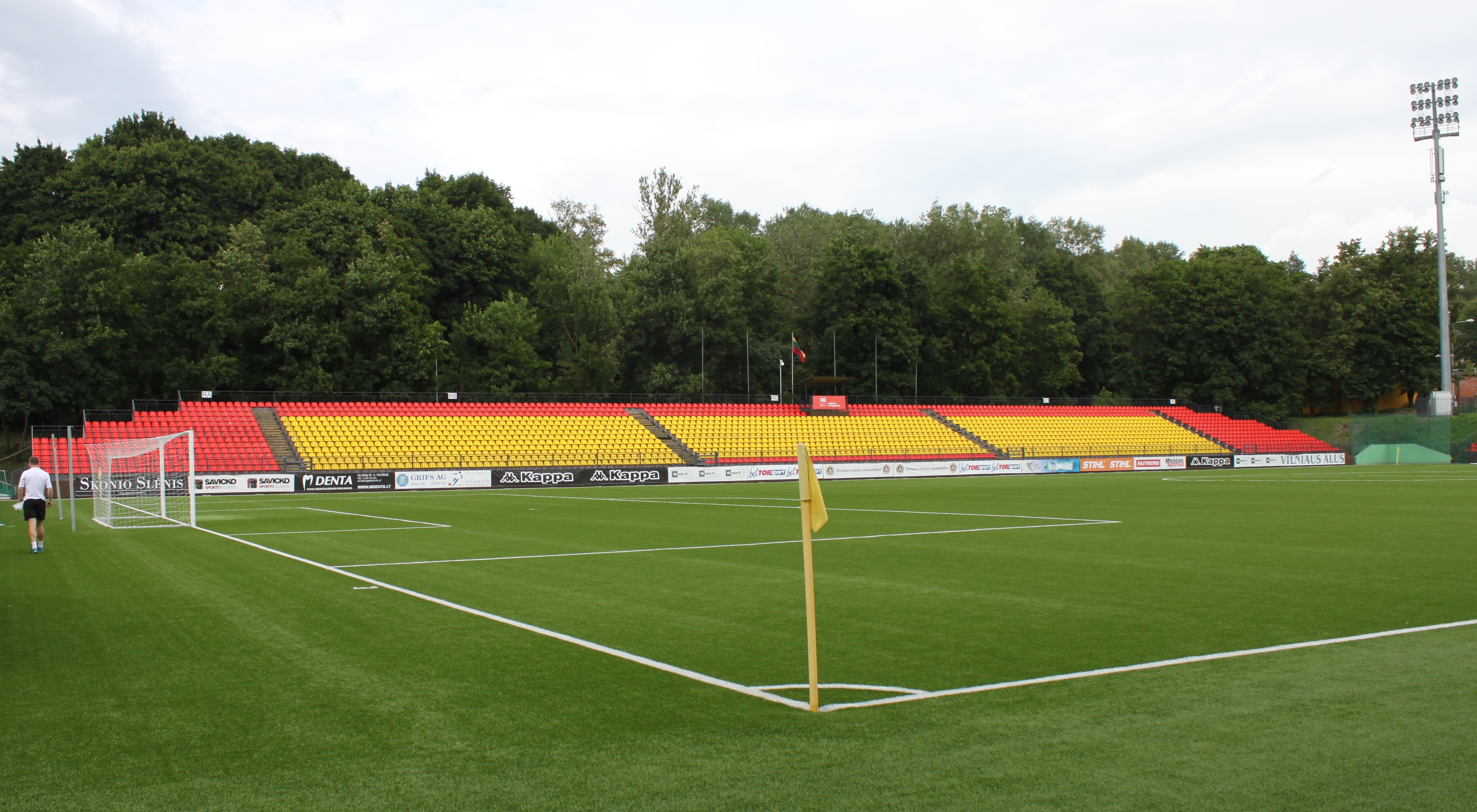
The East Stand

== See also ==
- List of football stadiums in Lithuania
- Lithuania National Stadium
