= List of indoor arenas in Lithuania =

The following is a list of indoor arenas in Lithuania, ordered by capacity. The venues are by their final capacity after construction for seating-only events. There is more capacity if standing room is included (e.g. for concerts). The minimum required capacity is 1,000.

== Current arenas ==
Image	Hall	Capacity	Seated	City	Team	Inaugurated	Ref.
	Žalgiris Arena	20,000	15,708	Kaunas	BC Žalgiris	2011	
	Arena Vilnius	13,500	10,000	Vilnius	BC Rytas	2004	
	Multifunctional Sports Centre Arena		7,150	Vilnius		U/C est 2028	
	Švyturio Arena	7,500	6,200	Klaipėda	BC Neptūnas	2011	
	Kalnapilio Arena	7,323	5,950	Panevėžys	BC Lietkabelis	2008	
	Šiauliai Arena	7,300	5,500	Šiauliai	BC Šiauliai	2007	
	Alytus Arena	7,000	5,500	Alytus		2011	
	Sporto Rūmai	4,400	Closed	Vilnius	—	1971	
	Sportima Arena	3,157	3,157	Vilnius	Football; Wrestling	2001	
	Utena Arena	3,130	2,750	Utena	BC Juventus	2009	
	ARVI Football Indoor Arena	2,660	2,660	Marijampolė	FK Sūduva Marijampolė*	2008	
	Kaunas Sports Hall	5,000	2,500	Kaunas	BC Žalgiris*	1939	
	Pramogų Arena	4,000	2,500	Vilnius	Ice hockey	2002	
	Compensa Concert Hall	3,500	2,300	Vilnius	—N/a	2014	
	Palanga Summer Concert Hall	3,000	2,200	Palanga	—N/a	2015	
	Kėdainiai Arena	3,000	2,200	Kėdainiai	BC Nevėžis	2013	
	Jonava Arena	2,800	2,200	Jonava	BC Jonava	2017	
	Active Vilnius Arena	2,750	2,051	Vilnius	BC Kibirkštis Vilnius	2005	
	Sports Palace Aukštaitija	2,000	Closed // Under reconstruction	Panevėžys	Basketball	1965	
	Elektrėnai Ice Palace	2,000	1,778	Elektrėnai	SC Energija	1977	
	Mažeikiai Arena		1,540	Mažeikiai		U/C est 2029	
	Tauragė Arena	2,500	1,510	Tauragė	BC Tauragė	2026	
	Prienai Arena	1,800	1,500	Prienai		2011	
	Plungė Arena		1,500	Plungė	KK Olimpas	2026	
	Pieno žvaigždės Arena	1,500	1,500	Pasvalys	HC Pieno žvaigždės	2011	
	SEB Arena	1,500	1,500	Vilnius	Tennis	2008	
	Gargždai Arena	1,500	1,400	Gargždai	BC Gargždai	2025	
	Aerottoria Arena	1,500	1,358	Vilnius		2025	
	NBA Basketball School Arena	1,490	1,315	Vilnius		2022	
	Garliava Arena	1,800	1,300	Garliava	Basketball	2011	
	Palanga Arena	1,500	1,200	Palanga	BC Olimpas Palanga	2014	
	Šiauliai Indoor Hall	1,000	1,000	Šiauliai		U/C est. 2027	
	Daina Cinema	1,000	1,000	Kaunas	—N/a	1936	
	Klaipėda Ice Arena		850	Klaipėda	Ice Hockey	U/C est. N/A	
	Vilnius Ice Arena		848	Vilnius	Ice Hockey	U/C est. N/A	
	Kretinga Arena	1,300	822	Kretinga	BC Kretinga	2023	
	Telšiai Arena	1,100	752	Telšiai	BC Telšiai; BC Mažeikiai	2018 (Note: De jure a reconstruction took place in the original 1969 venue, however an entirely new structure was erected.)	

Notes

- * – used sometimes as a secondary venue
- † – used solely as a training facility

== See also ==
- List of indoor arenas in Europe
- List of indoor arenas by capacity
- Lists of stadiums
