= List of football stadiums in Lithuania =

The following is a list of football stadiums in Lithuania, ranked in order of capacity, with the minimum capacity being 1,000.

== Current stadiums ==
#	Image	Stadium	Capacity	City	Home team
1		Darius and Girėnas Stadium	15,026	Kaunas	FK Kauno Žalgiris, Lithuania national football team
2		Aukštaitija Stadium	6,600	Panevėžys	FK Panevėžys
3		Mantinga Football Arena	6,250	Marijampolė	FK Sūduva
4		FK Žalgiris' Home Stadium	5,067	Vilnius	FK Žalgiris, FK Riteriai
5		Klaipėda Central Stadium	4,428	Klaipėda	FC Neptūnas
6		Savivaldybė Stadium	4,000	Šiauliai	FA Šiauliai, FC Gintra
7		Alytus Stadium	3,748	Alytus	DFK Dainava Alytus
8		Vytautas Stadium	3,200	Tauragė	FK Tauras Tauragė
9		Utenis Stadium	3,073	Utena	FK Utenos Utenis
10		Telšiai Central Stadium	3,000	Telšiai	FK Džiugas Telšiai
11		Visaginas Central Stadium	3,000	Visaginas	FK Interas Visaginas
12		Šilutė Stadium	3,000	Šilutė	FK Šilutė
13		Kėdainiai Stadium	3,000	Kėdainiai	FK Nevėžis
14		VDU Valdas Adamkus SC Stadium	3,000	Kaunas	
15		The New Trakai Stadium	3,000	Trakai	
16		Mažeikiai City Central Stadium	2,400	Mažeikiai	FK Atmosfera
17		Gargždai Stadium	2,323	Gargždai	FK Banga Gargždai
18		Gintaras Stadium (Vilnius)	2,000	Vilnius	
19		Pakruojis Stadium	2,000	Pakruojis	Pakruojis RSC
20		Palanga Central Stadium	1,500	Palanga	FK Gintaras Palanga
21		Raudondvaris Stadium	1,500	Raudondvaris	FC Hegelmann
22		FK Transinvest Stadium	1,500	Vilnius County	FK Transinvest
23		Raseiniai KKSC Stadium	1,500	Raseiniai	
24		PFA Stadium	1,500	Panevėžys	FK Panevėžys youth
25		Druskininkai LSC Stadium	1,500	Druskininkai	
26		Daugėlių Stadium	1,200	Kuršėnai	FK Venta Kuršėnai
27		Plungė City Central Stadium	1,200	Plungė	FK Babrungas
28		Central stadium of Jonava	1,008	Jonava	FK Jonava
29		Ukmergė Central Stadium	1,000	Ukmergė	FKS Ukmergė
30		Klaipėda DDA Stadium	1,000	Klaipėda	
31		Klaipėda FM Stadium	1,000	Klaipėda	Klaipėdos FM
32		Biržai Central Stadium	1,000	Biržai	FK Širvėna
33		Kupiškio Central Stadium	1,000	Kupiškis	FC Narjanta
34		Birštonas SC Stadium	1,000	Birštonas	FK Nemunas
35		Vilnius University Stadium	1,000	Vilnius	

== Stadiums planned or under construction ==
#	Stadium	Capacity	City	Home team
1	Lithuania National Stadium	19,000	Vilnius	Lithuania national football team

== Indoor stadiums ==
#	Stadium	Capacity	City	Home team	Opened
1	Sportima Arena	3,157	Vilnius	VMFD Žalgiris Vilnius	2001
2	ARVI Football Indoor Arena	2,660	Marijampolė	FK Sūduva Marijampolė	2008

== See also ==
- List of indoor arenas in Lithuania
- List of European stadiums by capacity
- List of association football stadiums by capacity
- Lists of stadiums
