= Žalgiris Stadium =

Former football stadium in Vilnius, Lithuania

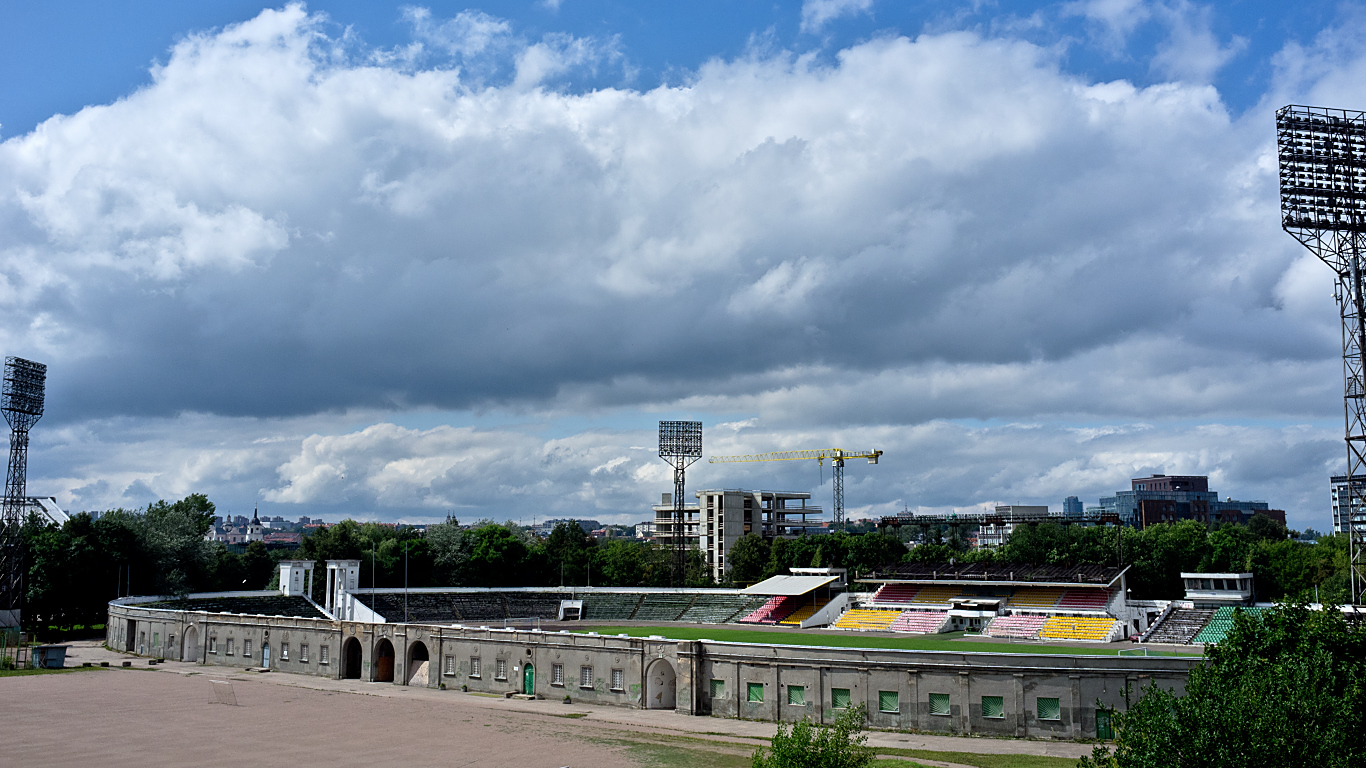
- Stadium before demolition
- Interactive map of Žalgiris Stadium
- Full name: Žalgiris Stadium
- Location: Vilnius, Lithuania
- Coordinates: 54°41′36″N 25°17′25″E
- Owner: Hanner
- Capacity: 15,029

Construction
- Opened: 1951
- Renovated: 1949–1950
- Closed: 2011
- Demolished: 2016

Žalgiris Stadium (Lithuanian: Žalgirio stadionas) was a multi-purpose stadium in Žirmūnai elderate of Vilnius, Lithuania. It was named after the Battle of Grunwald. The stadium held 15,029 and was the largest in Lithuania until its demolition.

== History ==
The original stadium was built during the Polish occupation of the Wilno Voivodeship. It was devised by Bolesław Waligóra, the senior lieutenant of the stationed infantry unit. The stadium was inaugurated on 6 June 1929. Before World War II the stadium was used by Pogoń Wilno; in 1936 the Polish athletics championships were held at the stadium.

The stadium was rebuilt by the German POWs after World War II and finished in 1950. Part of the auxiliary facilities of the overarching sports complex had been built on the desecrated graves of Jews interred in the Old Jewish Cemetery near the stadium.

After independence the stadium was an asset of the Ūkio Bankas Investment Group (ŪBIG), was used by the Lithuania national football team, but later it fell into disrepair and lost its meaning as the national stadium as all the international football matches moved to either Darius and Girėnas Stadium in Kaunas or the renovated LFF Stadium in Vilnius.

In 2015, the stadium was acquired in a court auction by Lithuanian real estate company Hanner who planned to demolish it and make way for apartments, hotel and offices.

The demolition of Žalgiris stadium was started on 5 July 2016.

== In popular culture ==
In 2010, Žalgiris Stadium was used by the BBC to film the television film United, depicting the Munich air disaster, as the location double of the Stadium JNA, where the quarterfinal game of 1957–58 European Cup was played.

== Concerts ==
The stadium was the location of major pop and rock concerts before the large indoor arenas in Lithuania were built.

- Bryan Adams played a concert at the stadium on 16 July 1999.
- Pet Shop Boys played a concert on 7 June 2000.
- Sting played on 17 June 2001.
- A-ha played on 10th Sep 2002.
- Marilyn Manson played there in 2003.

A concert by Depeche Mode during their 2009 tour was planned to be held at the stadium on 27 May, but it was cancelled only a few days before the date and not rescheduled on this tour.

Large outdoor concerts are now mostly held at Vingis Park.
