= Kretinga Arena =

Indoor arena in Lithuania

- Kretingos arena
- Interactive map of Kretinga Arena
- Full name: Kretingos sporto centras
- Address: Savanorių g. 23A, 97111; Kretinga; Lithuania
- Coordinates: 55.8934°N 21.2537°E
- Owner: Kretinga District Municipality
- Capacity: 822 (basketball)
- Record attendance: 1,237

Construction
- Groundbreaking: 1 December 2015
- Opened: 26 October 2023
- Cost: €8.5 million
- Architect: Simper
- General contractors: LitCon (2015–20); HSC Baltic (2021–23)

Tenant
- Kretinga (NKL)

Website
- kretingasc.lt

Kretinga Arena is a 822-seat indoor arena located in Kretinga, Lithuania. The venue is compactly located on the Kretinga stadium's land lot, to the right of the stadium. It is the home court to basketball team Kretinga.

== History ==
Plans for a new indoor arena were confirmed in 2006 as part of the Lithuania's government approved strategy for the expansion of Lithuanian sport objects. UAB Simper designed the building in 2013, and UAB LitCon signed up as the general contractor on 27 August 2015.

The foundation stone was laid on 1 December 2015, with the project confirmed to cost €6.25 million, aiming for completion by the start of 2020. The project was criticised by the LitCon's CEO Linas Piliponis for its drawled out financing timetable, a staple of the government budget's funded projects in Lithuania, with the statements that the company could built the arena in a two years period if the funding for the construction could be found and approved.

Over the span of the next several years, the endeavor has consistently grappled with rumors regarding the contractor's financial instability, stemming from its endured reputational damage from various other public projects that were failed to be delivered on time, budget or both as well as cancellations of some contracts. Ultimately, the situation led to the company filling for bankruptcy protection in June 2019 and being blacklisted in July. The contract was then terminated in March 2020, with 85% of the work completed.

UAB HSC Baltic won the tender to complete the construction of the building in Spring 2021, albeit with a cost increase of €2.177 million. BC Kretinga were expected to move in during the second part of the 2022–23 NKL season. Yet, negotiations on multiple identified defects ensued, leading to additional delays and subsequently pushing the restart of construction works to the year 2022.

On 26 October 2023, the arena was inaugurated with the first basketball game between BC Kretinga and BC Žalgiris-2 of the NKL, which ended in a 77–98 loss by the hosts. Around 1,300 spectators filled up the arena, officially reported as 1,211, setting a hardly beatable record for the 822-seater venue.

However, a successful playoffs push by the team during the 23–24 season, lead to a further four matches with 1,000+ attendances and a new record of 1,237 spectators being set in a Samogitian derby against Telšiai on 16 March 2024.

== See also ==
- List of indoor arenas in Lithuania
