= Darius and Girėnas Stadium =

Football stadium in Lithuania

- Ąžuolynas stadium

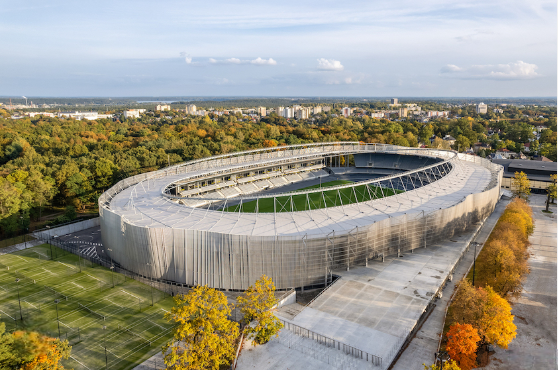
- UEFA
- Interactive map of Darius and Girėnas Stadium
- Full name: Dariaus ir Girėno stadionas
- Former names: Valstybinis stadionas Stepono Dariaus ir Stasio Girėno stadionas
- Address: Perkūno al. 5
- Location: Kaunas, Lithuania
- Coordinates: 54°53′50″N 23°56′13″E
- Owner: Kaunas City Municipality
- Operator: Žalgiris Group / Kauno arena (Žalgiris Arena)
- Capacity: 15,026 (sport matches); up to 55,000 (concerts); Capacity history; 12,000 (1979–1998); 9,180 (1998–2022); 15,026 (2022–present)
- Surface: "Mixto" hybrid grass "Lay&Play"
- Scoreboard: Yes
- Record attendance: Concerts: 46,637 – Ed Sheeran (+–=÷× Tour, 3 August 2024); Football: 14,797 – Lithuania vs. Netherlands (7 September 2025)
- Field size: 105 m × 68 m (344 ft × 223 ft)

Construction
- Built: 1923–1925
- Opened: 1925
- Renovated: 1998, 2005, 2018–2022
- Expanded: 1935–1936, 1969–1979, 2018–2022
- Architects: Steponas Darius, Kęstutis Bulota (1936); Algimantas Alekna, Jonas Putna, Boleslovas Zabulionis (1979); Gintaras Čepurna, Tomas Kuleša, Mantas Navalinskas, Deivydas Pauža (2022)

Tenants
- FBK Kaunas (1993–2015); FK Kauno Žalgiris (2013–2018, 2022–present); FC Stumbras (2015–2018); FC Hegelmann (2023); FK Be1 (2025); Lithuanian national football team (1936–2013; 2022–present); Athletics Federation of Lithuania; Lithuania women's national football team (2026)

Website
- stadionas.lt

Darius and Girėnas stadium (Lithuanian: Dariaus ir Girėno stadionas) is a multi-use stadium in Kaunas, Lithuania. With a seating capacity of 15,026, it is the largest stadium in Lithuania and the Baltic states. Located in the Ąžuolynas park in Žaliakalnis district, it serves as a venue for football matches, athletic competitions, and other events. In 1998, the stadium was renovated according to UEFA regulations, and in 2005, it was modernised with the installation of the biggest stadium television screen in the Baltic states. The latest renovation started in 2018 and ended in 2022. During the sporting season, at least 50 events are held here annually.

Darius and Girėnas Stadium belongs to Žalgiris Group, which operates the largest arena in the Baltic States (Žalgirio Arena) and the Kaunas Sports Hall.

== History ==
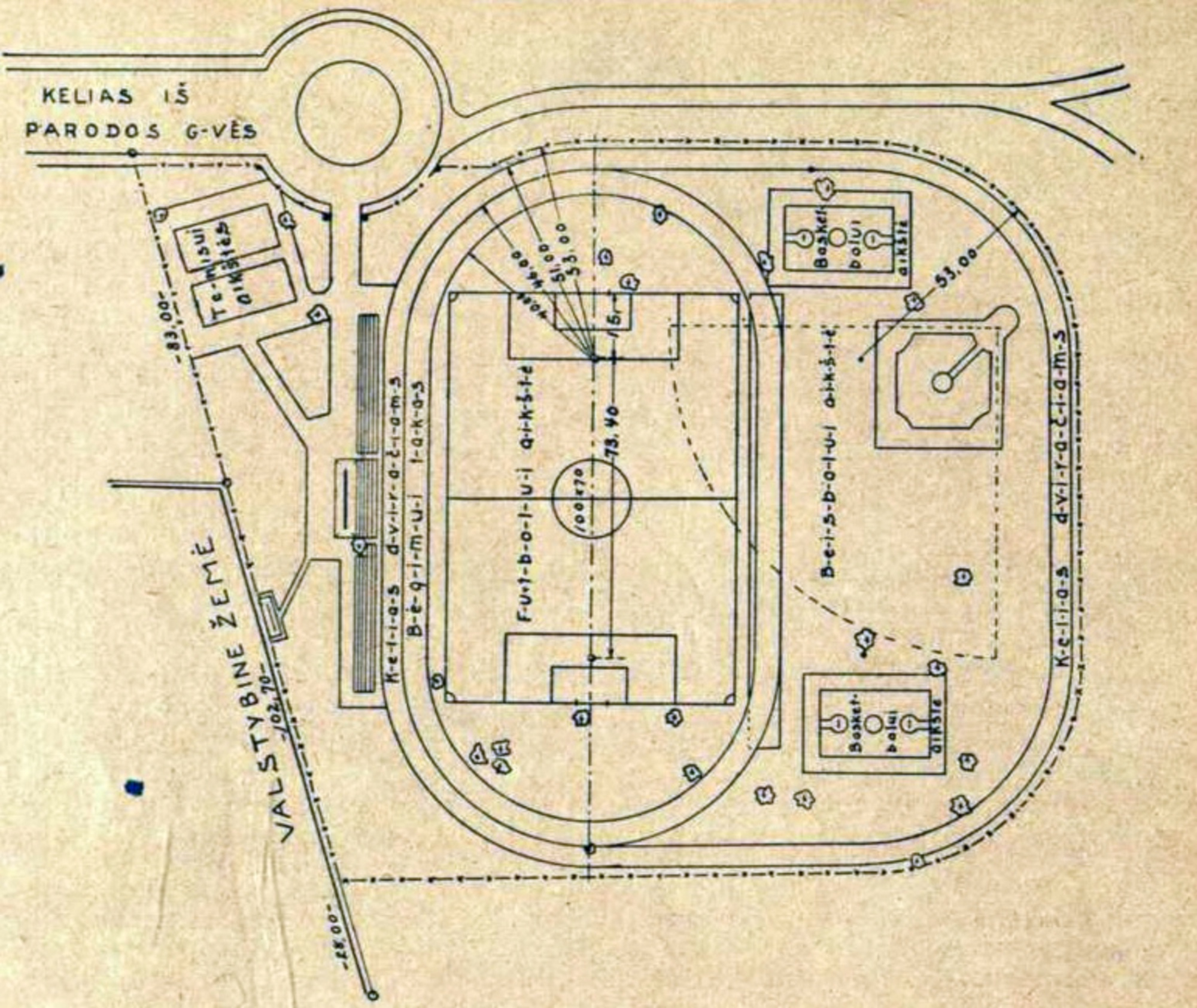
Architectural drawing of the 1923 football–athletics–baseball–track cycling stadium with basketball courts inside it

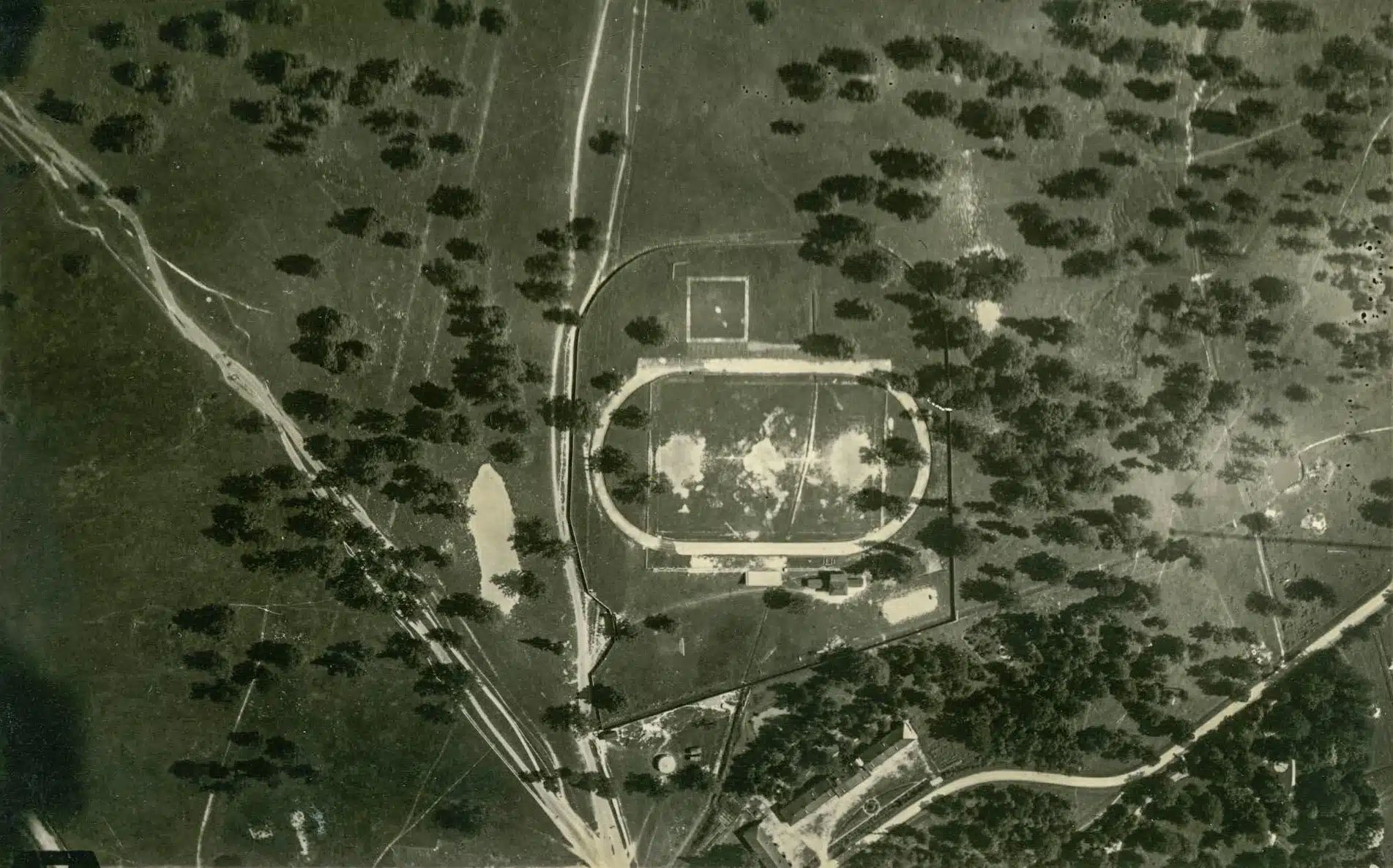
Aerial photo of the Stadium in 1920s

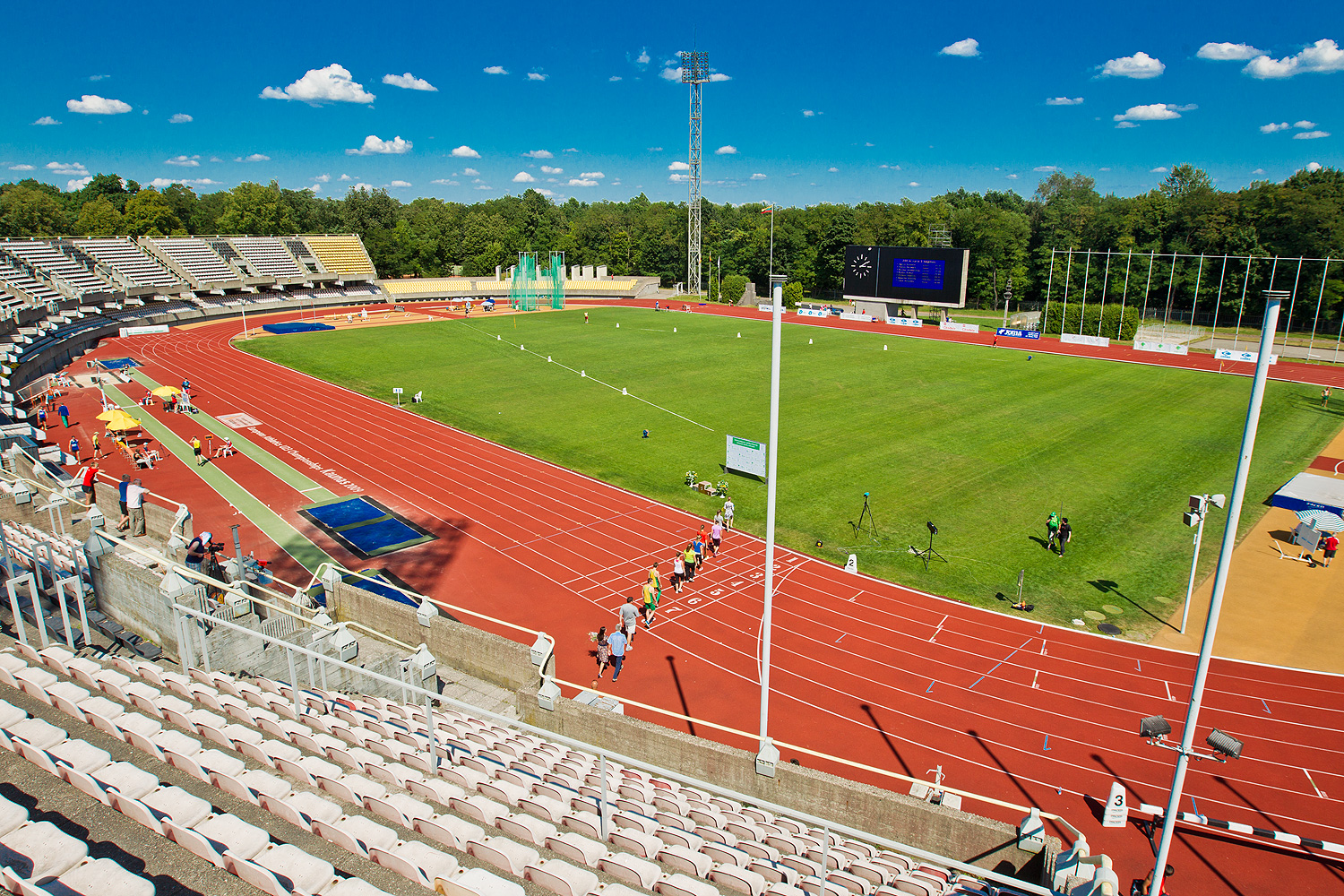
Stadium before reconstruction in 2018

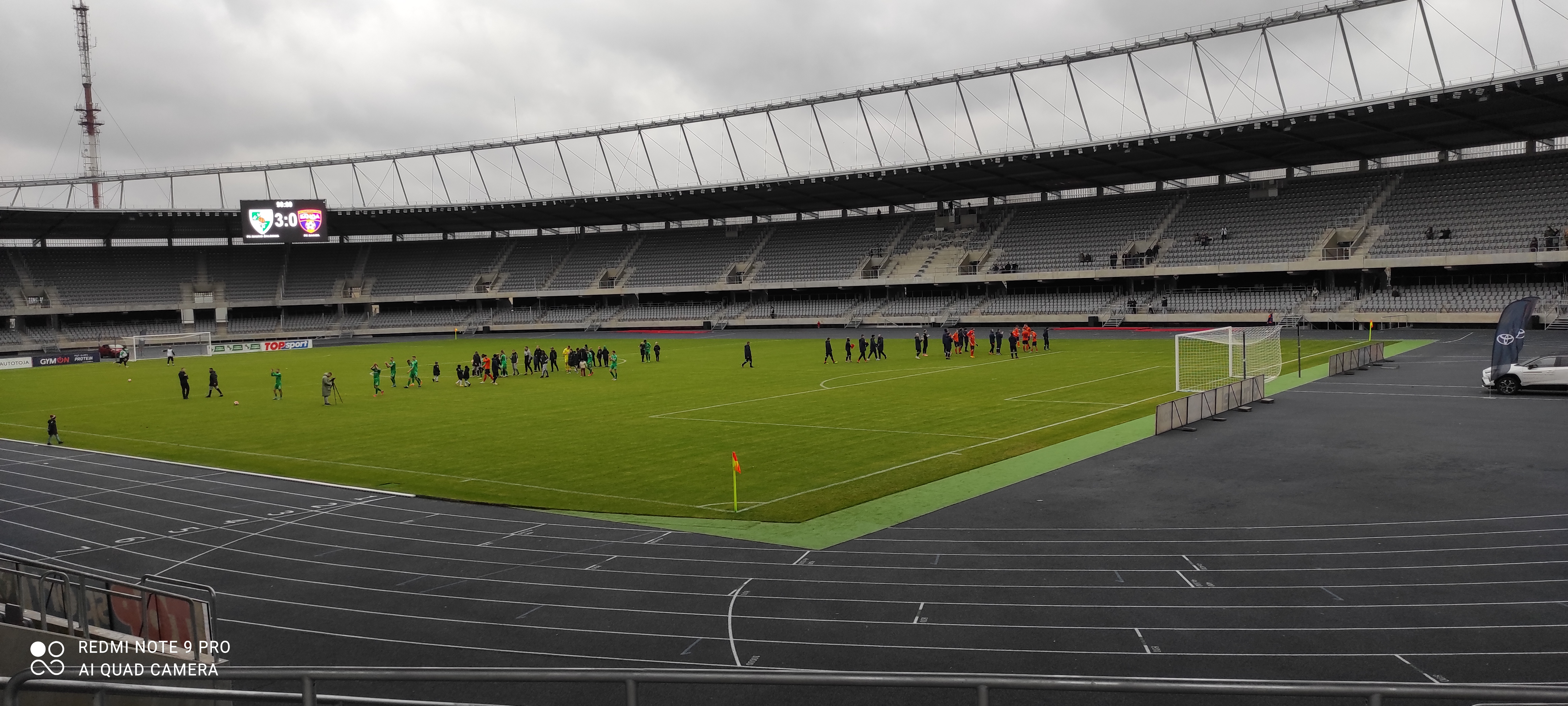
The stadium from the inside in 2022

The first stadium in this place was designed and established by Steponas Darius and Kęstutis Bulota in 1923, and completed in 1925. In 1935–1936, the stadium was renovated and named the State Stadium (Lithuanian: Valstybinis stadionas). Starting in 1969 the stadium underwent another reconstruction that lasted for 10 years until August 1979. Wooden tribunes were replaced with reinforced concrete structures and placed in a half circle.

After Lithuania regained independence, in 1993 the stadium was named after the Lithuanian pilots Steponas Darius and Stasys Girėnas, who died in a crash near the end of an attempted non-stop flight from New York to Lithuania. The site is currently the home ground of the football club FK Kauno Žalgiris. It is a part of the S. Darius and S. Girėnas sport center, which also includes the nearby Kaunas Sports Hall, built in 1939.

On 23 November 2021, the informal shortening Darius and Girėnas Stadium officially replaced the former name, eliminating the pilots' first names from the label.

== Reconstruction and reopening ==
In July 2010, talks began that modernizing the stadium is the cheapest option for Lithuania to develop a football stadium that could host international matches. Two thirds of the renovation costs were proposed to be provided by Lithuanian Football Federation. Despite many initiatives to launch the renovation from various groups no actual actions were started, as an agreement for funding and project specifications could not be achieved.

Another attempt to revitalize the stadium was started in February 2016 by the newly elected Kaunas City Municipality which adopted a plan to revamp major sport infrastructure in Kaunas. Early proposals suggested that the seating capacity should be expanded to 12,500–20,000 roof-covered seats, under-soil heating installed, and stadium should reach Category 4 of UEFA stadium classification.

On 18 August 2017, the reconstruction project was officially presented to the public. After the reconstruction, the stadium will have seating capacity of 15,026 for sport events and up to 55,000 for concerts and other events. On 15 June 2018, Kayı Construction and Kaunas City Municipality signed the reconstruction contract. The stadium was re-opened with the 2022 Lithuanian Football Cup final on 16 October 2022. The reconstruction cost 43 million euros. After reconstruction, the stadium had Desso GrassMaster surface and is completely covered with a roof over the stands.

The stadium has 9 VIP boxes with a capacity of more than 300 people, 3 VIP lounge areas with a capacity of about 900 people, 3 conference rooms and more than 180 parking spaces.

5 modern outdoor tennis courts with artificial grass have been installed near the stadium.

In January 2025, new construction for the pitch surface began. During the first year of operation under Žalgiris Arena management, it was found out that that there was too much black soil and clay in the layers below it. This prevented the grass from taking root more firmly in depth and interfered with high-quality drainage - water stagnated on the surface. Also, the top layer of the coating became too soft, slippery and easily damaged. A new "Mixto" hybrid grass "Lay&Play" technology surface was chosen to be used instead of Desso GrassMaster surface. On 12 March 2025, the new surface installation was finished. In accordance with UEFA recommendations, before the new pitch surface was installed, the automatic irrigation system was also upgraded to 24 nozzles.

On 6 May 2025, the President Valdas Adamkus Athletics Manege, which meets international requirements, was officially opened next to the stadium. The new manege will ensure high-quality conditions for training and warming up before prestigious starts or high-ranking competitions at the Darius and Girenas Stadium.

== Sporting events ==
=== Athletics ===
==== Lithuanian Athletics Championships ====
Lithuanian Athletics Championships is the national Lithuanian championship in athletics, organized by the Lithuanian Athletics Federation. The first competition was held in 1921 at the location where Darius and Girėnas Stadium was built. It is the oldest sporting event in Lithuania. The competition was held in Kaunas a total of 36 times. The 89th 2014 Lithuanian Athletics Championships was the last time competition was held in Kaunas.

==== XVIII European Athletics U20 Championships ====
The 2005 European Athletics Junior Championships was the 18th edition of the biennial athletics competition for European under-20 athletes, which was held in Kaunas, Lithuania on 21–24 July.

==== IX European Athletics U23 Championships ====
The 7th European Athletics U23 Championships were held between 16 and 19 July 2009 in the S. Darius and S. Girėnas Stadium in Kaunas, Lithuania.

==== World Athletics Continental Tour ====
On 18 June 2025, The World Athletics Continental Tour competition (Bronze level) "Cosma Cup" was held at the Darius and Girėnas Stadium – the first athletics event of this level in the history of Lithuania. The Cosma Cup competition was attended by Lithuanian Olympians Andrius Gudžius, Diana Zagainova, Modesta Justė Morauskaitė, Gediminas Truskauskas, Liveta Jasiūnaitė, Martynas Alekna, Lithuanian record holder Simas Bertašius, rising sprint star Adas Dambrauskas, and world-class foreign track and field athletes: 2021 Tokyo Olympics champion, 2019 and 2023 world champion Swedish Daniel Ståhl, World and European champion from Britain Adam Gemili, African vice-champions from South Africa Rivaldo Roberts and Mafori Ryan Mphahlele, world vice-champion with the French 4×400 m team Loïc Prévot, South American champion from Tatiane Raquel da Silva. These competitions were combined with the Lithuanian Athletics Cup competitions.

=== Football ===
==== XII UEFA European Under-19 Championship ====
The 2013 UEFA European Under-19 Championship was the 12th edition of the UEFA European Under-19 Championship, since its reclassification from an under-18 tournament in 2002, and the 62nd since the tournament was created in 1948. It was hosted in Lithuania from 20 July to 1 August 2013, in three cities.

==== Lithuanian national football team games (since 2022) ====
The following is a list of Lithuanian national football team matches since 2022.

Win Draw Loss Fixture

16 November 2022 2022 Baltic Cup	Lithuania	0–0 (5–6 p)	Iceland	Kaunas, Lithuania
16:00 UTC+2		Report		Stadium: Darius and Girėnas Stadium; Attendance: 5,934; Referee: Andris Treimanis (Latvia)
	Penalties
	Girdvainis (penalty scored); Gineitis (penalty scored); Novikovas (penalty scored); Golubickas (penalty scored); Baravykas (penalty scored); Žebrauskas (penalty missed)		(penalty scored) Guðjohnsen; (penalty scored) Þórðarson; (penalty scored) Sigurdsson; (penalty scored) Anderson; (penalty scored) Ingason; (penalty scored) Thrándarson

17 June 2023 UEFA Euro 2024 qualifying	Lithuania	1–1	Bulgaria	Kaunas, Lithuania
16:00 UTC+3	Girdvainis 15'	Report	Petkov 27'	Stadium: Darius and Girėnas Stadium; Attendance: 14,230; Referee: Jakob Alexander Sundberg (Denmark)

7 September 2023 UEFA Euro 2024 qualifying	Lithuania	2–2	Montenegro	Kaunas, Lithuania
19:00 UTC+3	Paulauskas 71'; Černych 90+4'	Report	Krstović 78'; Savić 89'	Stadium: Darius and Girėnas Stadium; Attendance: 11,328; Referee: Mohammed Al-Hakim (Sweden)

10 September 2023 UEFA Euro 2024 qualifying	Lithuania	1–3	Serbia	Kaunas, Lithuania
21:45 UTC+3	Paulauskas 45'	Report	A. Mitrović 21', 32', 43'	Stadium: Darius and Girėnas Stadium; Attendance: 8,586; Referee: Sascha Stegemann (Germany)

17 October 2023 UEFA Euro 2024 qualifying	Lithuania	2–2	Hungary	Kaunas, Lithuania
21:45 UTC+3	Černych 20'; Širvys 36'	Report	Szoboszlai 67' (pen.); Varga 82'	Stadium: Darius and Girėnas Stadium; Attendance: 5,349; Referee: Juxhin Xhaja (Albania)

26 March 2024 Nations League play-out	Lithuania	1–0 (2–0 agg.)	Gibraltar	Kaunas, Lithuania
19:00 UTC+2	Černych 51'	Report		Stadium: Darius and Girėnas Stadium; Attendance: 6,102; Referee: Duje Strukan (Croatia)
Note: Lithuania won 2–0 on aggregate and remained in League C, while Gibraltar were relegated to League D.

11 June 2024 2024 Baltic Cup	Lithuania	1–1 (3–4 p)	Estonia	Kaunas, Lithuania
19:00 UTC+3	Matulevicius 84'	Report	Lepik 82'	Stadium: Darius and Girėnas Stadium; Attendance: 5,900; Referee: Andris Treimanis (Latvia)
	Penalties
	Lasickas (penalty missed); Černych (penalty missed); Tutyškinas (penalty scored); Novikovas (penalty scored); Klimavičius (penalty scored)		(penalty scored) Mets; (penalty scored) Lepik; (penalty scored) Palumets; (penalty missed) Sorga; (penalty scored) Vetkal

12 October 2024 2024–25 Nations League	Lithuania	1–2	Kosovo	Kaunas, Lithuania
16:00	Golubickas 84'	Report	Zhegrova 20'; E. Krasniqi 65'	Stadium: Darius and Girėnas Stadium; Attendance: 7,554; Referee: Ondřej Berka (Czech Republic)

15 October 2024 2024–25 Nations League	Lithuania	1–2	Romania	Kaunas, Lithuania
21:45	Kučys 7' (pen.)	Report	R. Marin 18' (pen.); Drăguș 65'	Stadium: Darius and Girėnas Stadium; Attendance: 2,585; Referee: Nick Walsh (Scotland)

24 March 2025 2026 FIFA World Cup qualification	Lithuania	2-2	Finland	Kaunas, Lithuania
21:45	Kučys 39'; Gineitis 69'	Report	Kairinen 3'; Pohjanpalo 17'	Stadium: Darius and Girėnas Stadium; Attendance: 10,421; Referee: Erik Lambrechts (Belgium)

4 September 2025 2026 FIFA World Cup qualification	Lithuania	1–1	Malta	Kaunas, Lithuania
21:45	Gineitis 90+6'	Report	Satariano 83'	Stadium: Darius and Girenas Stadium; Attendance: 7,854; Referee: Giorgi Kruashvili (Georgia)

7 September 2025 2026 FIFA World Cup qualification	Lithuania	2–3	Netherlands	Kaunas, Lithuania
19:00	Gineitis 36'; Girdvainis 43'	Report	Depay 11', 63'; Q. Timber 33'	Stadium: Darius and Girenas Stadium; Attendance: 14,797; Referee: Elchin Masiyev (Azerbaijan)

12 October 2025 2026 FIFA World Cup qualification	Lithuania	0–2	Poland	Kaunas, Lithuania
21:45		Report	Szymański 15'; Lewandowski 64'	Stadium: Darius and Girenas Stadium; Attendance: 11,741; Referee: Ondřej Berka (Czech Republic)

13 November 2025 Friendly	Lithuania	0–0	Israel	Kaunas, Lithuania
19:00 UTC+2		Report		Stadium: Darius and Girenas Stadium; Attendance: 0 Referee: Edgars Maļcevs (Latvia)

29 March 2026 Friendly	Lithuania	0–2	Georgia	Kaunas, Lithuania
16:00 UTC+3		Report	Mikautadze 70' (pen.), 84'	Stadium: Darius and Girėnas Stadium; Attendance: 7,726

6 June 2026 2026 Baltic Cup	Lithuania	1–1 (5–4 p)	Latvia	Kaunas, Lithuania
16:00 UTC+3	Kučys 28'	Report	Toņiševs 60'	Stadium: Darius and Girėnas Stadium; Attendance: 7,789; Referee: Joonas Jaanotivs (Estonia)
	Penalties
	Utkus (penalty scored); Gineitis (penalty scored); Kučys (penalty scored); Michelbrink (penalty missed); Novikovas (penalty scored); Burba (penalty scored)		(penalty scored) Regža; (penalty scored) Ķigurs; (penalty missed) Meļņiks; (penalty scored) Cigaņiks; (penalty scored) Saveļjevs; (penalty missed) Penkevics

27 September 2026 2026–27 UEFA Nations League	Lithuania	1-1	Azerbaijan	Kaunas, Lithuania
15:00 (16:00 UTC+3)	Kučys 9' (pen.)	Report	Emreli 14'	Stadium: Darius and Girėnas Stadium; Attendance: 7,539; Referee: Menelaos Antoniou (Cyprus)

30 September 2026 Friendly	Lithuania	3–0	Andorra	Kaunas, Lithuania
19:00 UTC+3	Manfredas Ruzgis 21' (pen.); Faustas Steponavičius 27'; Armandas Kučys 46'	Report		Stadium: Darius and Girėnas Stadium

12 November 2026 Friendly	Lithuania	0–0	Suriname	Kaunas, Lithuania
19:00 UTC+2		Report		Stadium: Darius and Girėnas Stadium; Referee: Andris Treimanis (Latvia)

16 November 2026 2026–27 UEFA Nations League	Lithuania	v	Liechtenstein	Kaunas, Lithuania
19:00 UTC+2		Report		Stadium: Darius and Girėnas Stadium

==== Lithuania women's national football team (since 2022) ====
The following is a list of Lithuania women's national football team matches at Darius and Girėnas Stadium since 2022.

9 October 2026 2027 FIFA Women's World Cup play-offs	Lithuania	0–5	Sweden	Kaunas, Lithuania
18:05 (19:05 UTC+3)		Report (FIFA); Report (UEFA)	Schröder 23' (pen.), 58', 63'; Blackstenius 74'; Ilestedt 82'	Stadium: Darius and Girėnas Stadium; Attendance: 2,022; Referee: Deborah Anex (Switzerland)

==== Lithuanian Football Cup finals (since 2022) ====
The Lithuanian Football Federation Cup (Lithuanian: Lietuvos futbolo federacijos taurė) is a Lithuanian football cup competition contested in a knockout tournament format. The winner of the cup gains entitlement to participate in the Lithuanian Supercup as well as the UEFA Conference League.

16 October 2022 2022 Lithuanian Football Cup Final	Žalgiris	2–1 (a.e.t.)	Hegelmann	Darius and Girėnas Stadium, Kaunas
17:30	Marko Milićković 76'; Mario Pavelić 110'	summary report	90+4' Samuel Odeyobo	Attendance: 13,589; Referee: Manfredas Lukjančukas

1 October 2023 2023 Lithuanian Football Cup Final	TransINVEST	2–1	Šiauliai	Darius and Girėnas Stadium, Kaunas
15:30	Kawachi 54'; Zingertas 80'		Jankauskas 41'	Attendance: 8,764; Referee: Donatas Rumšas

29 September 2024 2024 Lithuanian Football Cup Final	Banga	0–0 (a.e.t.) (4—1 p)	Hegelmann	Darius and Girėnas Stadium, Kaunas
15:00				Attendance: 5,000; Referee: Orestas Abramavičius
	Penalties
	Januševskij (penalty scored); Ramanauskas (penalty scored); Vėževičius (penalty scored); Antužis (penalty scored)		(penalty missed) Brisola; (penalty scored) Figueredo; (penalty missed) Armalas

12 October 2026 2026 Lithuanian Football Cup Final	FK Minija	0-3	Kauno Žalgiris	Darius and Girėnas Stadium, Kaunas
			22' Kreković; 51' Debeljuh; 73' Konatar	Attendance: 3,816

==== UEFA Champions League, UEFA Europa League and UEFA Conference League qualifications games (since 2022) ====
13 July 2023 2023-24 UECL 1QR	Hegelmann (Lithuania)	0–5	(North Macedonia) Shkupi	Darius and Girėnas Stadium, Kaunas (Note: Hegelmann played their home match at the Darius and Girėnas Stadium in Kaunas, instead of their regular stadium, the LFF Kaunas Training Centre in Kaunas, which did not meet UEFA requirements.)
19:00 (20:00 UTC+3)		Report	Cephas 11', 45+1', 56', 62'; Queven 23'	Attendance: 2,054; Referee: Menelaos Antoniou (Cyprus)

3 August 2023 2023-24 UECL 2QR	Kauno Žalgiris (Lithuania)	1–2	(Poland) Lech Poznań	Darius and Girėnas Stadium, Kaunas
18:00 (19:00 UTC+3)	Uzėla 90+5'	Report	Marchwiński 14'; Ba Loua 90+2'	Attendance: 5,180; Referee: Mads-Kristoffer Kristoffersen (Denmark)

24 July 2025 2025-26 UECL 2QR	Kauno Žalgiris (Lithuania)	1–1	(Iceland) Valur	Darius and Girėnas Stadium, Kaunas
18:00 (19:00 UTC+3)	Jansonas 58'	Report	Haraldsson 88'	Attendance: 3,723; Referee: Jamie Robinson (Northern Ireland)

7 August 2025 2025-26 UECL 3QR	Kauno Žalgiris (Lithuania)	0–1	(Bulgaria) Arda	Darius and Girėnas Stadium, Kaunas
18:00 (19:00 UTC+3)		Report	Vutov 53'	Attendance: 7,562; Referee: Jérémy Muller (Luxembourg)

7 July 2026 2026-27 UCL 1QR	Kauno Žalgiris (Lithuania)	1–1	(Kosovo) Drita	Darius and Girėnas Stadium, Kaunas
18:00 (19:00 UTC+3)	Benchaib 24'	Report	Bl. Krasniqi 82'	Attendance: 4,484; Referee: Ívar Orri Kristjánsson (Iceland)

11 August 2026 2026-27 UCL 3QR	Kauno Žalgiris (Lithuania)	1–2	(Croatia) Dinamo Zagreb	Darius and Girėnas Stadium, Kaunas
19:00 (20:00 UTC+3)	Debeljuh 56'	Report	Kačavenda 19'; Mišić 30'	Attendance: 6,051; Referee: Davide Massa (Italy)

27 August 2026 2026-27 UEL POQR	Kauno Žalgiris (Lithuania)	1–0	(Turkey) Beşiktaş	Darius and Girėnas Stadium, Kaunas
19:00 (20:00 UTC+3)	Oliveira 64'	Report		Attendance: 7,079; Referee: Jesús Gil Manzano (Spain)

==== UEFA Conference League - League Phase games (since 2022) ====
During the 2026/2027 season, FK Kauno Žalgiris made its debut in the UEFA Conference League league phase for the first time in the club's history and will play three matches at home.

22 October 2026 2026-27 UECL LP MD2	Kauno Žalgiris (Lithuania)	1–4	(Norway) Brann	Darius and Girėnas Stadium, Kaunas
18:45 (19:45 UTC+3)	Oliveira 11'	Report	Casteo 7' (pen.); Holm 25', 40', 85'	Attendance: 4,383; Referee: Pavle Ilić (Serbia)

26 November 2026 2026-27 UECL LP MD4	Kauno Žalgiris (Lithuania)	v	(Latvia) Riga	Darius and Girėnas Stadium, Kaunas
18:45 (19:45 UTC+2)		Report

17 December 2026 2026-27 UECL LP MD6	Kauno Žalgiris (Lithuania)	v	(Germany) SC Freiburg	Darius and Girėnas Stadium, Kaunas
21:00 (22:00 UTC+2)		Report

==== 2024 UEFA Women's Under-19 Championship ====
The 2024 UEFA Women's Under-19 Championship was the 21st edition (25th in U18 and U19) of the UEFA Women's Under-19 Championship, the annual international youth football championship organised by UEFA for the women's under-19 national teams of Europe. Lithuania hosted the tournament.

14 July 2024 2024 UWU19 GS	Lithuania	0–10	England	Darius and Girėnas Stadium, Kaunas
16:00		Report	Pritchard 5', 39', 46'; Watson 12'; Agyemang 14', 24', 55'; Lia 57'; Potter 68'; Earl 90+3'	Attendance: 1209; Referee: Emanuela Rusta (Albania)

17 July 2024 2024 UWU19 GS	Lithuania	0–6	France	Darius and Girėnas Stadium, Kaunas
17:00		Report	Robillard 19', 30', 40'; Coutel 45'; Lushimba Bilombi 64'; Ben Khaled 90' (pen.)	Attendance: 745; Referee: Réka Molnár (Hungary)

20 July 2024 2024 UWU19 GS	Serbia	4–1	Lithuania	Darius and Girėnas Stadium, Kaunas
17:00	Matejić 4', 33', 90+7'; Babić 90+4'	Report	Jasaitytė 14'	Attendance: 512; Referee: Anastasia Mylopoulou (Greece)

24 July 2024 2024 UWU19 SF	Netherlands	2–0	France	Darius and Girėnas Stadium, Kaunas
17:00	Woons 19'; Tolhoek 42'	Report		Attendance: - Referee: Emanuela Rusta (Albania)

27 July 2024 2024 UWU19 Final	Spain	2–1 (a.e.t.)	Netherlands	Darius and Girėnas Stadium, Kaunas
17:00	Marisa 6'; Eguiguren 118'	Report	Tolhoek 59'	Attendance: - Referee: Silvia Gasperotti (Italy)

==== UEFA Youth League ====
On 17 September 2025, a UEFA Youth League qualifying match was held at the Darius and Girėnas Stadium between FK Be1 and HJK Helsinki. The match ended in a draw - 1:1.

17 September 2025 2025-26 UYL 1R	FK Be1 (Lithuania)	1–1	(Finland) HJK Helsinki	Darius and Girėnas Stadium, Kaunas
17:30 (18:30 UTC+3)	Gutauskas 60'	Report	Berisha 81'	Attendance: 723; Referee: Antoine Chiaramonti (Andorra)

== Concerts (since 2022) ==
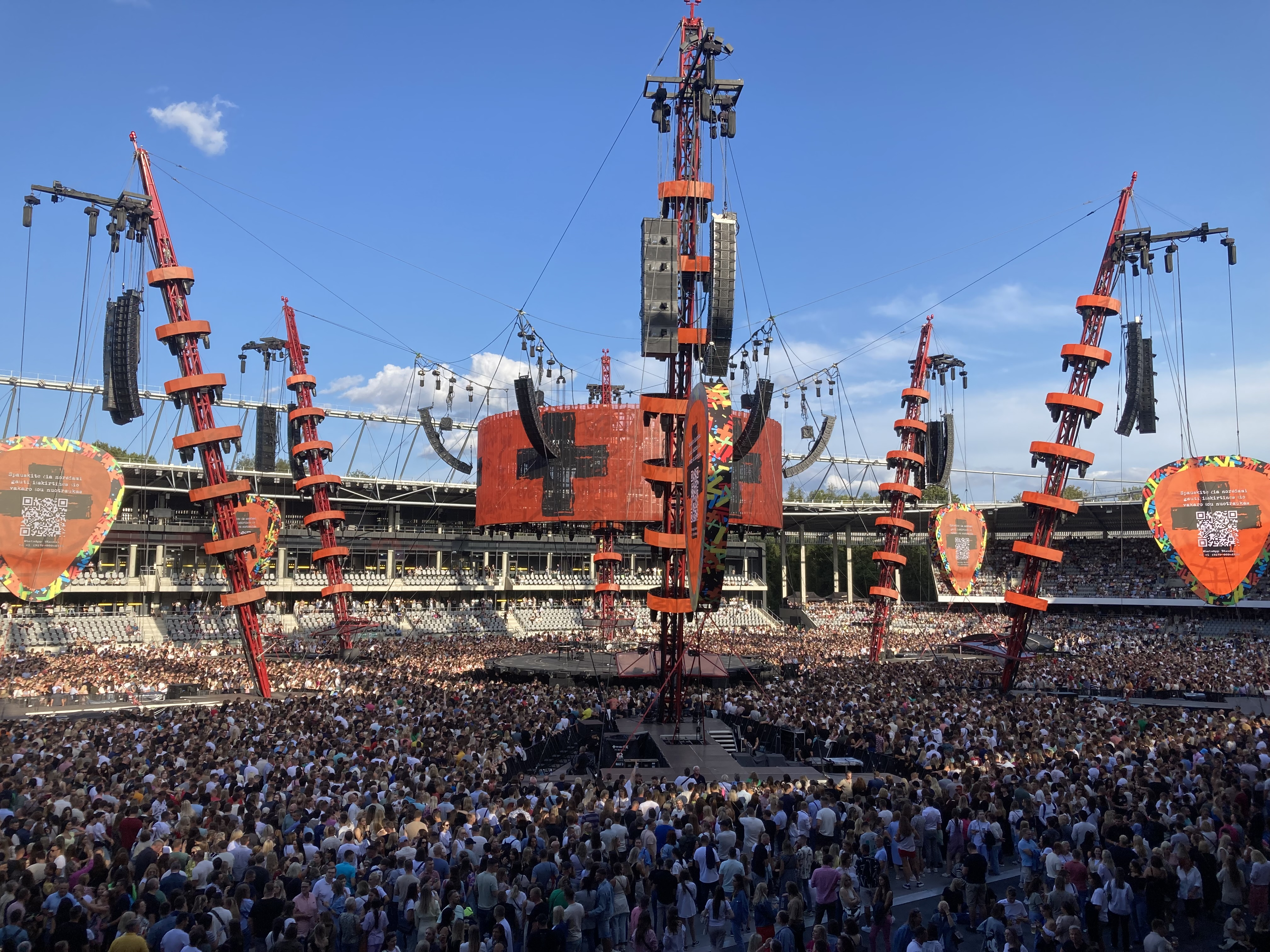
Ed Sheeran concert at the stadium

The grand opening show "Welcome Back!" (Lithuanian: „Sveiki sugrįžę!") took place at the stadium's opening event on 16 October 2022 (during the Lithuanian Football Cup final). It was attended by the most famous Lithuanian music performers, such as Saulius Prūsaitis, Iglė, Jonas Nainys-Jovani, Marijonas Mikutavičius, Justinas Jarutis, Jessica Shy and others. This performance is not considered a full concert and is therefore not presented. The opening match and the show were officially watched by attendance of 13,589 spectators.

In August 2024, British singer Ed Sheeran held two concerts at the stadium that attracted 81,119 spectators, thus setting a record for ticket sales in the Baltic States, while the first date set record attendance of about 50,000 spectators. During these concerts, the nearby Kaunas Sports Hall was also used as a technical area.

List of concerts at Darius and Girėnas Stadium, showing date, artist, tour and attendance and notes
Date	Artist(s)	Tour	Attendance	Notes
26 August 2023	(Lithuania) Sel	SEL | Kaunas	35,600	The first concert at the stadium after the reconstruction.
3 August 2024	(United Kingdom) Ed Sheeran	+–=÷× Tour	81,119	The first concert of a foreign artist in the stadium; The first 360-degree stage concert in a stadium.; A record stadium event - the first concert was watched by 46,637 spectators; The second most attended concert of all time in Lithuania; All tickets for the first show were sold out.
4 August 2024	(United Kingdom) Ed Sheeran	+–=÷× Tour	81,119	Extra date added due to demand. The second concert was watched by 34,482 spectators.
30 August 2024	(Lithuania) Jessica Shy	Jessica Shy Kaunas	39,599	The Lithuanian music concert that sold the most tickets in 2024; The second most visited concert of Lithuanian music in the country's history.
6 June 2025	(United States) Justin Timberlake	The Forget Tomorrow World Tour	45,000	Justin Timberlake's first concert in Lithuania; All tickets were sold out within 80 minutes on the day of general onsale. The concert is considered a continuation of the tour and is being named JT Live 2025.
10 July 2025	(United States) Guns N' Roses	Because What You Want & What You Get Are Two Completely Different Things Tour	30,000+	The band's first concert in Lithuania and only concert in the Baltic States.
1 August 2025	(United Kingdom) Robbie Williams	Britpop Tour	25,000	The artist's fourth concert in Lithuania and third in Kaunas. When the concert was announced, it was called Robbie Williams Live 2025, but was later officially renamed the BRITPOP Tour.
21 August 2025	(United States) Post Malone	Big Ass Stadium Tour	30,940	The artist's first concert in Lithuania and the artist's only concert in the Baltic States.
31 July 2026	(United States) Pitbull	I’m Back Tour	45,000	The artist's first concert in Lithuania. All tickets for the concert were sold out 5 months before the event. Due to high demand, an additional concert at the Žalgiris Arena was later announced.
22 May 2027	(Lithuania) Lilas ir Innomine	2027 SHOW	-	Lilas ir Innomine is the third Lithuanian artist to announce his solo concert at Darius and Girėnas Stadium - it will also be the largest concert in the group's history.
28 August 2027	(Lithuania) Žemaitukai	Žemaitukai - Kaunas	-	The band's biggest concert in their career and the fourth concert by Lithuanian performers at the stadium.

== Other events (since 2022) ==
From 14 June to 14 July 2024, UEFA Euro 2024 matches were broadcast on a big screen at the stadium and on the stadium's tennis courts.

From 22 November 2024 to 17 February 2025, a winter camp was held at the stadium, during which a skating rink was installed at the stadium.

On June 29, 2026, a stadium hosted the annual summer humor project, event series, and travel show "Komandiruotė 6: Pilnai stovintis" (The Business Trip), created and headlined by comedians Mantas Bartuševičius, Mantas Grimalis, and Airidas Jankus. The special guest of the event was event host and journalist Karolis Tiškevičius. According to unofficial data, the event was attended by approximately 2,000 spectators.

On July 17-19, 2026, the Lithuanian Functional Fitness Championship 2026 was held at the Darius and Girėnas Stadium and Kaunas Sports Hall. The championship brought together athletes of various ages and abilities from Lithuania and all over Europe.

== Home Teams ==
FK Kauno Žalgiris and the Lithuania national football team team play their home matches at the stadium.

== Partnerships & Tenants ==
On 17 May 2024, Žalgiris Shop opened its doors at the stadium.

In June 2024, the stadium signed a cooperation agreement with Carlsberg Group, under which part of the VIP Lounge area and the nearby tennis courts were named after the sponsor.

In August 2024, the HOLOS wellness studio opened its doors at the stadium.

In November 2024, the Fitnie Academy by Galinta sports club opened its doors at the stadium.

In April 2025, the stadium signed an agreement with Cupra, under which part of the stadium's VIP Lounge area was named after the sponsor.

In August 2025, the stadium signed an agreement with Birštono mineraliniai vandenys, under which part of the stadium's VIP Lounge area was named after the product AKVILĖ.

In April 2026, the Darius and Girėnas Stadium launched a partnership with the international HR management partner ICM Group. A selection of sectors have been named after the company, clearly showcasing its brand identity.

In 2026, the Darius and Girėnas Stadium launched a partnership with financial technology provider payabl., under which part of the stadium's VIP Lounge area was named after the sponsor.

== Transport ==
Darius and Girėnas Stadium is located just 1,5 km. from the main pedestrian street of the city – Laisvės alėja.

During major stadium events, 3 hours before, during and 3 hours after the event, event ticket holders can travel by city public transport for free, and for the convenience of spectators, regular bus and trolleybus routes run more frequently, and additional special routes "ST1", "ST2", "ST3", "ST4" are also organized.

During major concerts and sporting events, residents of the capital can also arrive at the stadium by special bus and train routes, which return to Vilnius after the event.

== Notable events and facts ==
The opening and consecration ceremonies of the first stadium in Lithuania took place on 6–8 September 1924. During the celebration, football, basketball, baseball tournaments, and athletics competitions were held.

One of the largest events held at the stadium during the interwar years was the first National Olympics, held on 17–31 July 1938 – a worldwide Lithuanian sports festival and gathering. About 10,000 people attended the opening ceremonies, and 2,000 athletes from all over the world gathered. President Antanas Smetona presented the athletes with the Olympic flag, and a thousand doves were released into the sky.

During his sports career, former President of the Republic of Lithuania Valdas Adamkus competed in athletics at the stadium.

In 1960, the first rugby football match in Lithuania was held at the stadium.

On 15 September 1990, German singer Dieter Bohlen and the band Blue Systems performed at the stadium.

On 6 September 1993, Pope John Paul II held a meeting with young people at the stadium during his visit to Lithuania. The event was attended by 30,000 spectators.

On 2 August 2000, the FBK Kaunas team, which made its debut in the European football club tournament – the UEFA Champions League – played a match at the stadium against the Glasgow Rangers.

On 7 September 2002, the first match of the 2004 European Football Championship Group V qualifying match was played between the Lithuania and the world vice-champion Germany. During the break in the match, one of the most famous Lithuanian football players, Valdas Ivanauskas, was escorted from the big football.

On 26 July 2005, the stadium hosted a match between one of the most successful football teams in Europe, the 2004–2005 UEFA Champions League winners Liverpool FC and FBK Kaunas.

On 24 March 2007, the 2008 European Football Championship qualifying match was played between Lithuania and the world vice-champion France. The match was broadcast live by Eurosport and about 30 television channels in various countries.

On 6 July 2007, a general song festival "Būties ratu" was held at the stadium. The festive program was attended by national youth, youth, young adults, girls, youth, seniors and elderly folk dance groups, as well as adult folk dance groups from abroad.

On 5 August 2008, FBK Kaunas achieved a historic victory: in the UEFA Champions League qualifiers, they eliminated the elite Scottish club Glasgow Rangers (0:0 away, 2:1 at home) and advanced to the third qualifying round.

At the end of March 2011, before the match between Lithuania and Spain, the stadium received criticism and attention from the global sports media due to the extremely poor pitch.

On 29 March 2011, the 2012 European Football Championship qualifying tournament Group I match was held between the Lithuania and Spain.

The first player to score a goal after the stadium's reconstruction was completed was Marko Milićković (2022 Lithuanian Football Cup Final, Žalgiris - Hegelmann, 16 October 2022)

Sel became the first band to perform at the stadium after its reconstruction.

On 30 September 2023, the Lithuanian and FIFA Football Legends match was held. Dida, Julio Cesar, Michel Salgado, Roque Junior, Levan Kobiashvili, Fabio Cannavaro, Carles Puyol, Youri Djorkaeff, Ricardo Quaresma, Aldair, Houssine Kharja, David Trezeguet, Esteban Cambiasso, Nuno Gomes, Christian Karembeu, Antonio Valencia, Serginho, Vincent Candela took part in the competition. FIFA President Gianni Infantino watched the match at the stadium.

On 6 October 2023, the band Sel released a video clip for the song Aš pakelsiu, which was filmed during a concert at the stadium.

Ed Sheeran became the first artist to sell out tickets for a stadium concert.

Ed Sheeran became the first and only artist to hold an additional concert at the stadium.

On 26 July 2024, Lithuanian artist Martynas Kavaliauskas released a video clip for the song "Karaliai", part of which was filmed at the stadium.

After the first of two concerts, Ed Sheeran posted a video showing him playing Pokemon at the Darius and Girenas Stadium.

More than 100 heavy trucks delivered the equipment needed for E. Sheeran's concerts in August 2024. This is a record amount in the history of Kaunas events.

Ed Sheeran and his +–=÷× Tour is the highest-grossing concert/tour in stadium history: the concert sold 81,119 tickets (out of 96,627) and grossed $8,597,307.

In September 2024, the match between Lithuania and Cyprus did not take place at the stadium and was moved to Marijampolė due to the turf being damaged during the previous concerts held at the stadium and not having time to recover.

Justin Timberlake and his The Forget Tomorrow World Tour (JT Live 2025) hold the record for the fastest-selling stadium concert tickets: all tickets for the artist's concert were officially sold out 80 minutes after the start of public sales (27 September 2024)

On 27 September 2024, British singer Ed Sheeran released a live performance video for the song The A Team, filmed during concerts in Kaunas.

On 27 September 2024, Lithuanian singer Jessica Shy released a live performance video of the song Tarp geltonų rūtų, filmed during concerts in Kaunas.

On 4 October 2024, British singer Ed Sheeran released a live performance video for the song Perfect, filmed during concert in Kaunas.

On 18 October 2024, Lithuanian singer Jessica Shy released her second live performance video (song Nepyk ant manęs), filmed during concert in Kaunas

In October 2024, the Darius and Girenas Stadium celebrated its 100th anniversary.

On 28 November 2024, the Lithuanian band Žemaitukai (together with the band Niekšės) released a video clip for the song "Šiandien aš švenčiu", part of which was filmed at the stadium.

On 27 December 2024, British singer Ed Sheeran released a live performance video for the song Bad Habits, filmed during concerts in Kaunas.

On 12 April 2025, the A Lyga match between FK Kauno Žalgiris and FK Sūduva broke the league's twenty-year attendance record and became the most attended A League match in Kaunas. The match was watched by 6,575 spectators.

During Justin Timberlake's concert at the stadium, the logistics chain involved about a thousand people: 200 security guards, 300 waiters, 100 cleaning crew members, ticket control and technical staff, as well as about 200 members from Live Nation and Justin Timberlake's teams.

The cheapest ticket for a concert at the stadium in the 2023-2025 period cost 29 euros (a concert by the band Sel), the most expensive - 1,115.70 euros (a concert by the band Guns N' Roses).

Guns N' Roses are the first foreign artists who did not sell out all the tickets for their concert at Darius and Girėnas Stadium (Ed Sheeran sold out all the tickets for one of his two concerts).

Former Minister of Finance of the Republic of Lithuania and former Prime Minister of Lithuania Ingrida Šimonytė attended the Guns N' Roses concert - the politician is a big fan of the band.

Guns N' Roses veteran bassist Duff McKagan shared a photo from the performance online after the concert and the news that his wife (or rather, her grandparents) is from Lithuania and came to the stadium specifically for this purpose.

On 7 August 2025, the FK Kauno Žalgiris club's all-time attendance record was set at Darius and Girėnas Stadium - 7,562 spectators watched the UEFA Conference League third qualifying round match against FC Arda.

Memphis Depay became the Netherlands' all-time top scorer, scoring two goals in his team's victory over Lithuania on 7 September 2025, in a 2026 FIFA World Cup qualification.

On 12 October 2025, a record number of away fans attended the 2026 FIFA World Cup qualification match between Lithuania and Poland - there were about 4,000 fans from Poland at the stadium.

On 12 October 2025, during the 2026 FIFA World Cup qualification match between Lithuania and Poland, one of the fans suffered a cardiac arrest, which was restored thanks to attentive spectators and doctors after performing cardiopulmonary resuscitation (CPR).

On 12 October 2025, the Prime Minister of Lithuania, Inga Ruginienė, and the Prime Minister of Poland, Donald Tusk, visited the 2026 FIFA World Cup qualification match between Lithuania and Poland.

On 22 October 2025, during the A Lyga match between FK Kauno Žalgiris and FK Žalgiris (1:2) held at the stadium, the home team was awarded the first title in the club's history (winning the national championship).

On May 31, 2026, at the Darius and Girėnas Stadium, the record for FK Kauno Žalgiris and the highest Lithuanian football league TOPLYGA of this century was broken once again – according to official data, the match against FK Žalgiris was attended by 8,308 spectators.

During the Pitbull concert on July 31, 2026, a wedding was celebrated in one of the stadium's VIP boxes. This information was posted on the stadium's social media accounts after the concert.

On August 5, 2026, an evening sale was held at the Žalgiris Shop located in the stadium with comedian and event host Laura Dragūnaite and BC Žalgiris player Marek Blaževič.

== See also ==
- List of football stadiums in Lithuania
- Lithuania National Stadium
- Žalgiris Arena
- Kaunas Sports Hall
- FK Kauno Žalgiris
