= Lithuania National Stadium =

Football stadium under construction in Lithuania

- Lietuvos nacionalinis stadionas
- Interactive map of Lithuania National Stadium
- Location: Vilnius, Lithuania
- Coordinates: 54°42′30″N 25°15′28″E
- Capacity: 18,000

Construction
- Built: 1987–1991 (abandoned), 2023–present
- Architects: Damon Lavelle of Populous and UAB Cloud Architektai

The Lithuania National Stadium (Lithuanian: Nacionalinis stadionas) is a multi-use stadium in Vilnius, Lithuania, which is currently under construction. It is designed for football matches and is scheduled to host the home matches of the Lithuania national football team. It would replace the demolished Žalgiris Stadium and the current LFF Stadium as the main stadiums in Vilnius.

== Construction history ==
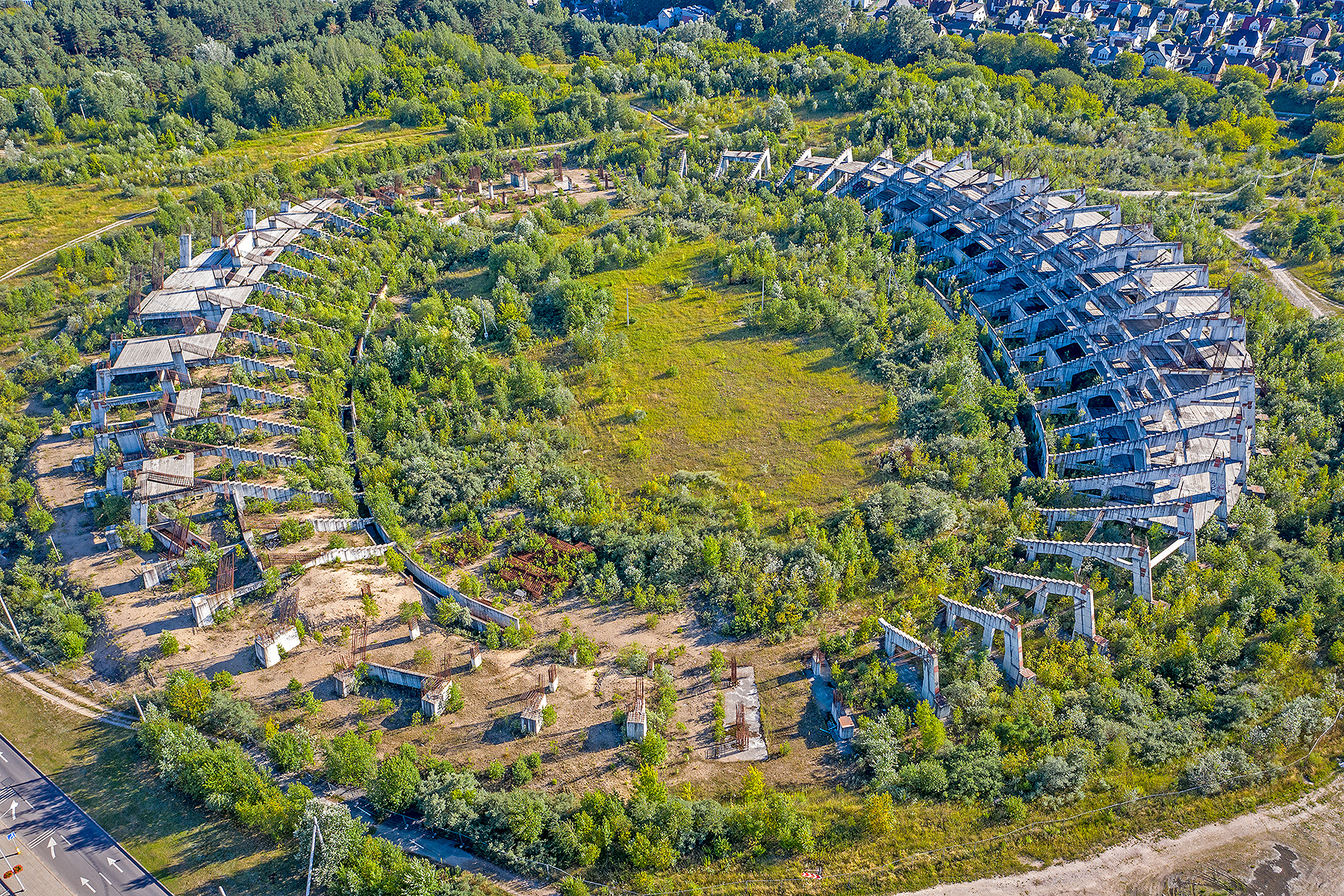
The stadium was built from 1987 to 1991. Its construction resumed in 2022 but was once again stopped in 2023.

The idea to build a stadium dates back to 1980s. The project for the stadium was prepared by architect Algimantas Nasvytis in 1985. The construction started in 1987, but stopped in 1991 due to economic turmoil and lack of funds. In 2006, the government of Lithuania declared the stadium an object of national importance and arranged new contractors. The construction was resumed in February 2008, but was abandoned later in the year due to lack of funds amid the Great Recession. Moreover, in 2009, the Supreme Court of Lithuania ruled that the construction contracts were signed not in accordance to the law and thus annulled them.

In May 2013, the government began to look for ways to complete the project. In March 2014, it was decided to utilize the public–private partnership model and to request funding from the European Union. A call for bids for a brand new project was announced in September 2016, but the results were challenged in courts and the negotiations were delayed due disagreements on funding model. Ultimately, the Vilnius City Council approved the €156 million construction contract in December 2019, but it was blocked by the Public Procurement Office on a basis that the government assumed too much risk. Vilnius City challenged the decision in courts and the project was again delayed until the case reached the Court of Appeal which, in April 2021, made a final ruling that the project may proceed.

Demolition of the abandoned skeletal structures began in January 2022. The construction of the new stadium officially began after the construction permit was formally issued in May 2023. Yet again, the project was halted after one of the investors, BaltCap, ran into financial problems; following the approval by the European Commission, the agreement was revised and the project was taken over by the real estate development company Hanner and construction resumed in July 2025.

== Design ==
The stadium is designed to have 18,000 seats, which would meet the requirements of category 4 UEFA stadium. The stadium is designed by Populous and UAB Cloud Architektai. The overall project is a complex which will include about 30 objects, with the other main structures being: three football fields, 3,000-seat athletics stadium, an indoor complex with areas for gymnastics, handball, volleyball, boxing and six basketball courts, sports museum, community center with a library, 300-seat kindergarten, and 1,600-space parking lot.

The entire complex would occupy an area of 22 hectares (54 acres) with the main stadium taking just about 10% of the area. The national government will operate the sports museum, Vilnius City Municipality will operate the community center and the kindergarten, while Kauno Arena received a concession to operate the stadium and other objects.

== See also ==
- Darius and Girėnas Stadium
