= Kayı Construction =

Kayı Construction (Kayı İnşaat) is a Turkish construction conglomerate established in 1991, based in Istanbul. Coşkun Yılmaz is the founder and the chairman of Kayı Construction. Engineering News-Record placed the group in the Top 225 International Contractors globally since 2008, reaching No.161 in 2012.

As of 2012, Kayı Group employed more than 8000 workers on projects in nearly 11 countries. It is an organisation in the fields of high-profile construction engineering projects such as industrial buildings, business centers, and retail complexes. Kayı has real estate investments in several countries. Since 1991, Kayı has completed more than five hundred projects throughout many countries. Kayı is an ISO 9001:2008, ISO 14001:2004, OHSAS 18001:2007 certified company.
