= Natanas Žebrauskas =

Lithuanian footballer (born 2002)

Personal information
- Date of birth: 18 February 2002 (age 24)
- Place of birth: Gargždai, Lithuania
- Height: 1.85 m (6 ft 1 in)
- Position: Right-back

Youth career
- Banga Gargždai
- 2018–2021: 1. FC Nürnberg
- 2021–2022: Greuther Fürth

Senior career*
Years	Team	Apps	(Gls)
2021–2023	Greuther Fürth II	46	(0)
2022–2023	Greuther Fürth	1	(0)
2023–	Rot-Weiß Erfurt	0	(0)
2024-	FK Banga	70	(1)

International career^{‡}
2019	Lithuania U19	5	(0)
2021–	Lithuania U21	6	(0)
2022–	Lithuania	1	(0)
- * Club domestic league appearances and goals as of 13 July 2026 ‡ National team caps and goals as of 25 September 2022

Natanas Žebrauskas (born 18 February 2002) is a Lithuanian international footballer who plays for Lithuanian club FK Banga Gargždai.

== Club career ==
Growing through the youth ranks of Banga Gargždai, in his Lithuanian hometown Gargždai, before joining the FC Nürnberg academy in 2018. He however made the move to another German club in the summer of 2022, joining Greuther Fürth, first playing with its reserve team.

Žebrauskas made his professional debut for Greuther Fürth on 11 September 2022, coming on as a substitute during the 2–1 away 2. Bundesliga loss to Magdeburg.

In the summer of 2023, Žebrauskas signed a two-year contract with Rot-Weiß Erfurt in the fourth-tier Regionalliga.

== International career ==
Already an under-19 and under-21 international with Lithuania, Natanas Žebrauskas was first called to the senior team in May 2022, whist still playing for the U21 the following month.

He made his international debut for Lithuania senior team on 25 September 2022, replacing Dominykas Barauskas just before half-time, during a 1–0 Nations league away loss to Luxembourg.
