= BC Kretinga =

Lithuanian basketball club

- Leagues: National Basketball League
- Founded: 2006
- Arena: Kretinga Arena
- Location: Kretinga, Lithuania
- Team colors: Yellow, and Blue
- President: (Lithuania) Valentinas Rumiancevas
- Head coach: (Lithuania) Arimantas Mikaločius
Home	Away

BC Kretinga is a professional basketball club based in Kretinga, Lithuania currently playing in the National Basketball League.

== Current roster ==
Note: Flags indicate national team eligibility at FIBA-sanctioned events. Players may hold other non-FIBA nationalities not displayed.

BC Kretinga roster
Players
Coaches

Pos.	No.	Nat.	Name	Ht.	Wt.	Age
F	3	(Lithuania)	Preibys, Edgaras	2.00 m (6 ft 7 in)	94 kg (207 lb)	24 – 25 March 2002
PG	4	(Lithuania)	Matutis, Dominykas	1.80 m (5 ft 11 in)	75 kg (165 lb)	35 – 21 January 1991
C	7	(Serbia)	Ivić, Srdjan	2.03 m (6 ft 8 in)	104 kg (229 lb)	30 – 4 May 1995
SG	10	(Lithuania)	Saprykinas, Haroldas	1.87 m (6 ft 2 in)	80 kg (176 lb)	30 – 10 July 1995
C	13	(Lithuania)	Zabita, Rytis	2.00 m (6 ft 7 in)	102 kg (225 lb)	31 – 15 September 1994
PG	21	(Lithuania)	Viskontas, Aidas	1.86 m (6 ft 1 in)	78 kg (172 lb)	39 – 21 May 1986
PF	22	(Lithuania)	Žilius, Eimantas	2.01 m (6 ft 7 in)	94 kg (207 lb)	26 – 22 July 1999
SG	23	(Lithuania)	Šimkevičius, Rokas	1.89 m (6 ft 2 in)	90 kg (198 lb)	35 – 7 July 1990
C	74	(Lithuania)	Polekauskas, Lukas	2.04 m (6 ft 8 in)	94 kg (207 lb)	31 – 7 March 1995
SF	77	(Lithuania)	Kvietkauskas, Ugnius	1.94 m (6 ft 4 in)	85 kg (187 lb)	22 – 14 December 2003

Head coach

- (Lithuania) Arimantas Mikaločius

Assistant coach(es)

- (Lithuania) Gediminas Drungys

Legend

- (C) Team captain
- Injured

- Roster
Updated: 13-09-2021

== Club achievements ==
- 2020-2021 season: RKL 1st place
