= 2024–25 UEFA Conference League qualifying =

European football tournament

2024–25 UEFA Conference League qualifying was the preliminary phase of the 2024–25 UEFA Conference League, prior to the competition proper. Qualification consisted of the qualifying phase (first to third rounds) and the play-off round. It began on 10 July and ended on 29 August 2024.

A total of 152 teams competed in the qualifying system, with 20 teams in the Champions Path and 132 teams in the Main Path. The 24 winners of the play-off round advanced to the league phase, to join the 12 losers of the Europa League play-off round.

== Format ==
The qualifying phase and play-off round was split into two paths – the Champions Path and the Main Path. The Champions Path contained teams which were eliminated from the Champions League Champions Path, and the Europa League Champions Path and the Main Path contained teams which qualified through their domestic league or as domestic cup winners as well as teams eliminated from the Europa League Main Path.

Each tie was played over two legs, with each team playing one leg at home. The team that scored more goals on aggregate over the two legs advanced to the next round. If the aggregate score was level at the end of normal time of the second leg, extra time was played, and if the same number of goals was scored by both teams during extra time, the tie was decided by a penalty shoot-out.

In the draws for each round in the Main Path, teams were seeded based on their UEFA club coefficients at the beginning of the season, with the teams divided into seeded and unseeded pots containing the same number of teams. A seeded team was drawn against an unseeded team, with the order of legs in each tie decided by draw. As the identity of the winners of the previous round may not have been known at the time of the draws, the seeding was carried out under the assumption that the team with the higher coefficient of an undecided tie advanced to the subsequent round, which meant if the team with the lower coefficient advanced, it simply took the seeding of its opponent.

In the draws for each round in the Champions Path, teams were seeded based on the round in which they entered the Conference League. As a result, there was no seeding in the second and third qualifying rounds.

Prior to the draws, UEFA could form "groups" in accordance with the principles set by the Club Competitions Committee, purely for the convenience of the draw and not to resemble any real groupings in the sense of the competition. Teams from associations with political conflicts as decided by UEFA could not be drawn into the same tie. After the draws, the order of legs of a tie could be reversed by UEFA due to scheduling or venue conflicts.

== Schedule ==
The schedule of the competition was as follows. Matches were scheduled for Thursdays, though exceptionally could take place on Tuesdays or Wednesdays due to scheduling conflicts.

Schedule for 2024–25 UEFA Conference League
Round	Draw date	First leg	Second leg
First qualifying round	18 June 2024	11 July 2024	18 July 2024
Second qualifying round	19 June 2024	25 July 2024	1 August 2024
Third qualifying round	22 July 2024	8 August 2024	15 August 2024
Play-off round	5 August 2024	22 August 2024	29 August 2024

== Teams ==
=== Champions Path ===
The Champions Path included league champions which were eliminated from the Champions Path qualifying phase of the Champions League and the Champions Path qualifying phase of the Europa League and consisted of the following rounds:

- Second qualifying round (12 teams): 12 of the 14 losers of the Champions League first qualifying round (two of the teams received a bye to the third qualifying round).
- Third qualifying round (8 teams): 6 winners of the second qualifying round, and the 2 losers of the Champions League first qualifying round that received a bye.
- Play-off round (10 teams): 4 winners of the third qualifying round, and 6 losers of the Europa League Champions Path third qualifying round.

Below were the participating teams of the Champions Path (with their 2024 UEFA club coefficients, not used as seeding for the Champions Path, however), grouped by their starting rounds.

Key to colours
Winners of play-off round advanced to league phase

Play-off round
Team	Coeff.
(Faroe Islands) KÍ	10.000
(Gibraltar) Lincoln Red Imps	9.000
(Wales) The New Saints	8.500
(Slovenia) Celje	4.500
(Lithuania) Panevėžys	4.000
(Andorra) UE Santa Coloma	1.199

Third qualifying round
Team	Coeff.
(Finland) HJK	11.500
(Northern Ireland) Larne	4.500

Second qualifying round
Team	Coeff.
(Estonia) Flora	11.000
(Armenia) Pyunik	8.000
(Kosovo) Ballkani	6.000
(Georgia (country)) Dinamo Batumi	5.500
(Malta) Hamrun Spartans	4.500
(Kazakhstan) Ordabasy	4.000
(Iceland) Víkingur Reykjavík	4.000
(North Macedonia) Struga	3.500
(Luxembourg) Differdange 03	3.500
(Montenegro) Dečić	2.000
(Albania) Egnatia	1.475
(San Marino) Virtus	0.366

Notes

1. ^{UEL CH Q3} Losers of Europa League third qualifying round (Champions Path).
2. ^{UCL Q1} Losers of Champions League first qualifying round.

=== Main Path ===
The Main Path included league non-champions and domestic cup winners and consisted of the following rounds:

- First qualifying round (50 teams): 50 teams which entered in this round.
- Second qualifying round (86 teams): 55 teams which entered in this round, 6 losers of the Europa League Main Path first qualifying round, and 25 winners of the first qualifying round.
- Third qualifying round (52 teams): 9 losers of the Europa League Main Path second qualifying round, and 43 winners of the second qualifying round.
- Play-off round (38 teams): 5 teams which entered this round, 7 losers of the Europa League Main Path third qualifying round, and 26 winners of the third qualifying round.

Below were the participating teams of the League Path (with their 2024 UEFA club coefficients), grouped by their starting rounds.

Key to colours
Winners of play-off round advanced to league phase

Play-off round
Team	Coeff.
(England) Chelsea	96.000
(Italy) Fiorentina	42.000
(Spain) Real Betis	33.000
(Serbia) Partizan	25.500
(Germany) 1. FC Heidenheim	17.324
(France) Lens	13.366
(Croatia) Rijeka	12.000
(Turkey) Trabzonspor	11.500
(Belgium) Cercle Brugge	9.760
(Switzerland) Servette	9.000
(Greece) Panathinaikos	6.305
(Ukraine) Kryvbas Kryvyi Rih	5.600

Third qualifying round
Team	Coeff.
(Moldova) Sheriff Tiraspol	20.000
(Scotland) Kilmarnock	7.210
(Denmark) Silkeborg	6.290
(Israel) Maccabi Petah Tikva	6.225
(Serbia) Vojvodina	5.555
(Poland) Wisła Kraków	5.075
(Romania) Corvinul Hunedoara	4.275
(Bulgaria) Botev Plovdiv	4.075
(Slovakia) Ružomberok	3.925

Second qualifying round
Team	Coeff.
(Denmark) Copenhagen	51.500
(Belgium) Gent	45.000
(Turkey) İstanbul Başakşehir	29.000
(Romania) CFR Cluj	26.500
(Poland) Legia Warsaw	18.000
(Israel) Maccabi Haifa	18.000
(Israel) Hapoel Be'er Sheva	17.000
(Sweden) Djurgårdens IF	16.500
(Netherlands) Go Ahead Eagles	12.260
(Cyprus) Omonia	12.000
(Portugal) Vitória de Guimarães	11.263
(Kazakhstan) Astana	11.000
(Latvia) Riga	11.000
(Slovenia) Olimpija Ljubljana	10.500
(Ukraine) Dnipro-1	10.500
(Greece) AEK Athens	10.000
(Bosnia and Herzegovina) Zrinjski Mostar	9.500
(Slovenia) Maribor	9.500
(Croatia) Hajduk Split	9.000
(Croatia) Osijek	8.500
(Slovakia) Spartak Trnava	8.000
(Cyprus) AEK Larnaca	8.000
Austria Wien	8.000
Ararat-Armenia	8.000
(Liechtenstein) Vaduz	8.000
(Slovakia) DAC Dunajská Streda	8.000
(Kazakhstan) Tobol	7.500
(Hungary) Fehérvár	7.500
(Czech Republic) Mladá Boleslav	7.210
(Czech Republic) Baník Ostrava	7.210
(Scotland) St Mirren	7.210
(Romania) Universitatea Craiova	7.000
(Denmark) Brøndby	7.000
(Switzerland) Zürich	6.595
(Switzerland) St. Gallen	6.595
(Kosovo) Drita	6.500
(Norway) Brann	6.325
(Norway) Tromsø	6.325
(Sweden) BK Häcken	6.000
(Faroe Islands) HB	6.000
(Ukraine) Polissya Zhytomyr	5.600
(Serbia) Radnički 1923	5.555
(Poland) Śląsk Wrocław	5.075
(Luxembourg) Progrès Niederkorn	4.500
(Georgia (country)) Iberia 1999	4.500
(Cyprus) Pafos	4.420
(Hungary) Puskás Akadémia	4.375
(Hungary) Paks	4.375
(Bulgaria) CSKA 1948	4.075
(Bulgaria) Cherno More	4.075
(Azerbaijan) Sabah	4.025
(Azerbaijan) Zira	4.025
(Azerbaijan) Sumgayit	4.025
(Republic of Ireland) St Patrick's Athletic	4.000
(Moldova) Zimbru Chișinău	2.625
(Kosovo) Llapi	2.308
(Finland) Ilves	2.225
(Belarus) Neman Grodno	2.000
(Northern Ireland) Cliftonville	2.000
(Lithuania) TransINVEST	1.700
(Malta) Sliema Wanderers	1.650

First qualifying round
Team	Coeff.
(Lithuania) Žalgiris	11.500
(Northern Ireland) Linfield	10.000
(Finland) KuPS	10.000
(Iceland) Breiðablik	8.500
(Luxembourg) F91 Dudelange	8.500
(Montenegro) Budućnost Podgorica	8.000
(Georgia (country)) Dinamo Tbilisi	8.000
(North Macedonia) Shkëndija	8.000
(Faroe Islands) B36	7.000
(Albania) Partizani	6.500
(Bosnia and Herzegovina) Sarajevo	6.500
(Andorra) Inter Club d'Escaldes	6.000
(Estonia) FCI Levadia	6.000
(Albania) Tirana	5.500
(San Marino) Tre Penne	5.500
(Wales) Connah's Quay Nomads	5.500
(Estonia) Paide Linnameeskond	5.000
(Moldova) Milsami Orhei	5.000
(Northern Ireland) Crusaders	4.500
(San Marino) La Fiorita	4.500
(Latvia) Liepāja	4.500
(Republic of Ireland) Derry City	4.000
(Albania) Vllaznia	4.000
(Gibraltar) St Joseph's	4.000
(Armenia) Urartu	3.500
(Bosnia and Herzegovina) Velež Mostar	3.500
(Wales) Bala Town	3.500
(Belarus) Torpedo-BelAZ Zhodino	3.000
(Malta) Floriana	3.000
(Iceland) Valur	3.000
(Slovenia) Bravo	2.650
(Andorra) Atlètic Club d'Escaldes	2.500
(Georgia (country)) Torpedo Kutaisi	2.500
(Faroe Islands) Víkingur Gøta	2.500
(Iceland) Stjarnan	2.500
(Kosovo) Malisheva	2.308
(Kazakhstan) Aktobe	2.300
(Finland) VPS	2.225
(Republic of Ireland) Shelbourne	2.175
(Latvia) Auda	2.125
(Armenia) Noah	2.125
(Gibraltar) FCB Magpies	2.000
(Luxembourg) UNA Strassen	1.725
(Lithuania) Šiauliai	1.700
(Malta) Marsaxlokk	1.650
(Estonia) Tallinna Kalev	1.441
(Belarus) Isloch Minsk Raion	1.325
(North Macedonia) Tikvesh	1.200
(Wales) Caernarfon Town	1.158
(Montenegro) Mornar	1.141

Notes

1. ^{UEL MP Q3} Losers of Europa League third qualifying round (Main Path).
2. ^{UEL MP Q2} Losers of Europa League second qualifying round (Main Path).
3. ^{UEL MP Q1} Losers of Europa League first qualifying round (Main Path).

== First qualifying round ==
The draw for the first qualifying round was held on 18 June 2024.

=== Seeding ===
A total of 50 teams took part in the first qualifying round. Seeding of the teams was based on their 2024 UEFA club coefficients. Before the draw, UEFA allocated the teams into five groups of five seeded and five unseeded teams per the principles set by the Club Competitions Committee. The first team drawn in each tie was the home team for the first leg.

Group 1		Group 2		Group 3	
Seeded	Unseeded	Seeded	Unseeded	Seeded	Unseeded
(Montenegro) Budućnost Podgorica (2); (North Macedonia) Shkëndija (1); (Andorra) Inter Club d'Escaldes (3); (Albania) Tirana (4); (San Marino) La Fiorita (5)	(Bosnia and Herzegovina) Velež Mostar (6); (Georgia (country)) Torpedo Kutaisi (7); (Kosovo) Malisheva (8); (Armenia) Noah (9); (Belarus) Isloch Minsk Raion (10)	(Iceland) Breiðablik (1); (Luxembourg) F91 Dudelange (2); (San Marino) Tre Penne (3); (Northern Ireland) Crusaders (5); (Gibraltar) St Joseph's (4)	(Malta) Floriana (6); (Andorra) Atlètic Club d'Escaldes (8); (Republic of Ireland) Shelbourne (7); (North Macedonia) Tikvesh (9); (Wales) Caernarfon Town (10)	(Georgia (country)) Dinamo Tbilisi (1); (Albania) Partizani (2); (Bosnia and Herzegovina) Sarajevo (4); (Moldova) Milsami Orhei (3); (Armenia) Urartu (5)	(Belarus) Torpedo-BelAZ Zhodino (6); (Kazakhstan) Aktobe (7); (Malta) Marsaxlokk (8); (Estonia) Tallinna Kalev (10); (Montenegro) Mornar (9)
Group 4		Group 5			
Seeded	Unseeded	Seeded	Unseeded		
(Finland) KuPS (1); (Faroe Islands) B36 (2); (Estonia) FCI Levadia (3); (Wales) Connah's Quay Nomads (4); (Albania) Vllaznia (5)	(Iceland) Valur (10); (Slovenia) Bravo (7); (Latvia) Auda (8); (Luxembourg) UNA Strassen (9); (Lithuania) Šiauliai (6)	(Lithuania) Žalgiris (1); (Northern Ireland) Linfield (2); (Estonia) Paide Linnameeskond (3); (Latvia) Liepāja (4); (Republic of Ireland) Derry City (5)	(Wales) Bala Town (6); (Faroe Islands) Víkingur Gøta (7); (Iceland) Stjarnan (8); (Finland) VPS (9); (Gibraltar) FCB Magpies (10)		

=== Summary ===
The first legs were played on 10 and 11 July, and the second legs were played on 17 and 18 July 2024.

The winners of the ties advanced to the Main Path second qualifying round. The losers were eliminated from European competitions for the season.

First qualifying round
Team 1	Agg.	Team 2	1st leg	2nd leg
Velež Mostar (Bosnia and Herzegovina)	2–6	(Andorra) Inter Club d'Escaldes	1–1	1–5
Floriana (Malta)	4–2	(San Marino) Tre Penne	3–1	1–1
Torpedo-BelAZ Zhodino (Belarus)	2–4	(Moldova) Milsami Orhei	2–4	0–0
Šiauliai (Lithuania)	0–2	(Estonia) FCI Levadia	0–2	0–0
Bala Town (Wales)	2–3	(Estonia) Paide Linnameeskond	1–2	1–1 (a.e.t.)
La Fiorita (San Marino)	1–1 (4–2 p) (Note: Order of legs reversed after original draw.)	(Belarus) Isloch Minsk Raion	0–1	1–0 (a.e.t.)
Caernarfon Town (Wales)	3–3 (8–7 p)	(Northern Ireland) Crusaders	2–0	1–3 (a.e.t.)
Tallinna Kalev (Estonia)	1–4	(Armenia) Urartu	1–2	0–2
Valur (Iceland)	6–2	(Albania) Vllaznia	2–2	4–0
FCB Magpies (Gibraltar)	3–2	(Republic of Ireland) Derry City	2–0	1–2 (a.e.t.)
Malisheva (Kosovo)	1–3	(Montenegro) Budućnost Podgorica	1–0	0–3
Atlètic Club d'Escaldes (Andorra)	0–3	(Luxembourg) F91 Dudelange	0–1	0–2
Partizani (Albania)	3–2	(Malta) Marsaxlokk	1–1	2–1
Auda (Latvia)	3–0	(Faroe Islands) B36	2–0	1–0
Stjarnan (Iceland)	4–3	(Northern Ireland) Linfield	2–0	2–3
Torpedo Kutaisi (Georgia (country))	2–1	(Albania) Tirana	1–1	1–0
Shelbourne (Republic of Ireland)	3–2	(Gibraltar) St Joseph's	2–1	1–1
Aktobe (Kazakhstan)	3–3 (3–4 p)	(Bosnia and Herzegovina) Sarajevo	0–1	3–2 (a.e.t.)
Bravo (Slovenia)	2–1	(Wales) Connah's Quay Nomads	0–1	2–0 (a.e.t.)
Liepāja (Latvia)	1–3	(Faroe Islands) Víkingur Gøta	1–1	0–2
Noah (Armenia)	4–1	(North Macedonia) Shkëndija	2–0	2–1
Tikvesh (North Macedonia)	4–5	(Iceland) Breiðablik	3–2	1–3
Mornar (Montenegro)	3–2	(Georgia (country)) Dinamo Tbilisi	2–1	1–1
UNA Strassen (Luxembourg)	0–5	(Finland) KuPS	0–0	0–5
VPS (Finland)	1–3	(Lithuania) Žalgiris	1–2	0–1

== Second qualifying round ==
The draw for the second qualifying round was held on 19 June 2024.

=== Seeding ===
A total of 98 teams played in the second qualifying round – 12 in the Champions Path and 86 in the Main Path. Seeding of teams was based on their 2024 UEFA club coefficients. For the winners of the first qualifying round, whose identity was not known at the time of the draw, the club coefficient of the highest-ranked remaining team in each tie was used. For the losers of the Champions League first qualifying round and the Europa League first qualifying round, the club coefficient of the lower-ranked team in each tie was used. Before the draw, UEFA formed groups of seeded and unseeded teams per the principles set by the Club Competitions Committee. The first team drawn in each tie was the home team for the first leg.

Champions Path
Seeded	Unseeded
(Georgia (country)) Dinamo Batumi; (Estonia) Flora; (Malta) Hamrun Spartans; (Armenia) Pyunik; (Kazakhstan) Ordabasy; (Iceland) Víkingur Reykjavík	(North Macedonia) Struga; (Luxembourg) Differdange 03; (Montenegro) Dečić; (Albania) Egnatia; (Kosovo) Ballkani; (San Marino) Virtus

Main Path
Group 1		Group 2		Group 3	
Seeded	Unseeded	Seeded	Unseeded	Seeded	Unseeded
(Denmark) Copenhagen; (Luxembourg) F91 Dudelange; (Netherlands) Go Ahead Eagles; (Scotland) St Mirren; (Latvia) Auda	(Norway) Brann; (Sweden) BK Häcken; (Gibraltar) FCB Magpies; (Iceland) Valur; (Northern Ireland) Cliftonville	(Turkey) İstanbul Başakşehir; (Israel) Hapoel Be'er Sheva; (Cyprus) Omonia; (Hungary) Fehérvár; (Switzerland) St. Gallen	(Georgia (country)) Torpedo Kutaisi; (Bulgaria) Cherno More; (San Marino) La Fiorita; (Azerbaijan) Sumgayit; (Kazakhstan) Tobol	(Poland) Legia Warsaw; (Croatia) Hajduk Split; (Iceland) Breiðablik; Austria Wien; (Czech Republic) Mladá Boleslav	(Kosovo) Drita; (Faroe Islands) HB; (Wales) Caernarfon Town; (Finland) Ilves; (Lithuania) TransINVEST
Group 4		Group 5		Group 6	
Seeded	Unseeded	Seeded	Unseeded	Seeded	Unseeded
(Ukraine) Dnipro-1; (Bosnia and Herzegovina) Zrinjski Mostar; (Croatia) Osijek; (Montenegro) Budućnost Podgorica; (Armenia) Noah	(Estonia) FCI Levadia; (Slovenia) Bravo; (Hungary) Puskás Akadémia; (Bulgaria) CSKA 1948; (Malta) Sliema Wanderers	(Lithuania) Žalgiris; (Latvia) Riga; (Slovenia) Olimpija Ljubljana; (Slovakia) DAC Dunajská Streda; (Czech Republic) Baník Ostrava	(Ukraine) Polissya Zhytomyr; (Poland) Śląsk Wrocław; (Cyprus) Pafos; (Azerbaijan) Zira; (Armenia) Urartu	(Sweden) Djurgårdens IF; (Portugal) Vitória de Guimarães; (Greece) AEK Athens; (Romania) Universitatea Craiova; (Switzerland) Zürich	(Andorra) Inter Club d'Escaldes; (Malta) Floriana; (Luxembourg) Progrès Niederkorn; (Slovenia) Maribor; (Republic of Ireland) Shelbourne
Group 7		Group 8		Group 9	
Seeded	Unseeded	Seeded	Unseeded	Seeded	Unseeded
(Belgium) Gent; (Iceland) Stjarnan; (Finland) KuPS; (Liechtenstein) Vaduz; (Denmark) Brøndby	(Norway) Tromsø; (Estonia) Paide Linnameeskond; (Faroe Islands) Víkingur Gøta; (Republic of Ireland) St Patrick's Athletic; (Kosovo) Llapi	(Romania) CFR Cluj; (Slovakia) Spartak Trnava; Ararat-Armenia; (Montenegro) Mornar	(Bosnia and Herzegovina) Sarajevo; (Serbia) Radnički 1923; (Moldova) Zimbru Chișinău; (Belarus) Neman Grodno	(Israel) Maccabi Haifa; (Kazakhstan) Astana; (Cyprus) AEK Larnaca; (Albania) Partizani	(Moldova) Milsami Orhei; (Georgia (country)) Iberia 1999; (Hungary) Paks; (Azerbaijan) Sabah

Notes

1. ^{†} Losers of the Champions League first qualifying round, whose identity was not known at the time of draw. Teams in italics lost to a team with a lower coefficient, thus effectively taking the coefficient of their opponent in the draw.
2. ^{††} Winners of the first qualifying round, whose identity was not known at the time of draw. Teams in italics defeated a team with a higher coefficient, thus effectively taking the coefficient of their opponent in the draw.
3. ^{†††} Losers of the Europa League first qualifying round, whose identity was not known at the time of draw. Teams in italics lost to a team with a lower coefficient, thus effectively taking the coefficient of their opponent in the draw.

=== Summary ===
The first legs were played on 23, 24 and 25 July, and the second legs were played on 30, 31 July and 1 August 2024.

The winners of the ties advanced to the third qualifying round of their respective path. The losers were eliminated from European competitions for the season.

Second qualifying round
Team 1	Agg.	Team 2	1st leg	2nd leg
Champions Path
HJK (Finland)	Bye	N/A	—	—
Larne (Northern Ireland)	Bye	N/A	—	—
Differdange 03 (Luxembourg)	4–4 (3–4 p)	(Kazakhstan) Ordabasy	1–0	3–4 (a.e.t.)
Víkingur Reykjavík (Iceland)	2–1	(Albania) Egnatia	0–1	2–0
Virtus (San Marino)	2–5	(Estonia) Flora	0–0	2–5 (a.e.t.)
Struga (North Macedonia)	3–4	(Armenia) Pyunik	2–1	1–3
Dinamo Batumi (Georgia (country))	0–2	(Montenegro) Dečić	0–2	0–0
Ballkani (Kosovo)	2–0	(Malta) Hamrun Spartans	0–0	2–0
Main Path
Go Ahead Eagles (Netherlands)	1–2	(Norway) Brann	0–0	1–2
Omonia (Cyprus)	5–2	(Georgia (country)) Torpedo Kutaisi	3–1	2–1
Breiðablik (Iceland)	1–3	(Kosovo) Drita	1–2	0–1
Osijek (Croatia)	6–1	(Estonia) FCI Levadia	5–1	1–0
Olimpija Ljubljana (Slovenia)	4–1	(Ukraine) Polissya Zhytomyr	2–0	2–1
AEK Athens (Greece)	8–3	(Andorra) Inter Club d'Escaldes	4–3	4–0
KuPS (Finland)	0–2	(Norway) Tromsø	0–1	0–1
Valur (Iceland)	1–4	(Scotland) St Mirren	0–0	1–4
Sumgayit (Azerbaijan)	1–2	(Hungary) Fehérvár	1–2	0–0
Ilves (Finland)	5–5 (5–4 p)	Austria Wien	2–1	3–4 (a.e.t.)
CSKA 1948 (Bulgaria)	2–1	(Montenegro) Budućnost Podgorica	1–0	1–1 (a.e.t.)
Zira (Azerbaijan)	6–1	(Slovakia) DAC Dunajská Streda	4–0	2–1
Maribor (Slovenia)	4–3	(Romania) Universitatea Craiova	2–0	2–3
St Patrick's Athletic (Republic of Ireland)	5–3	(Liechtenstein) Vaduz	3–1	2–2
FCB Magpies (Gibraltar)	1–8 (Note: Order of legs reversed after original draw.)	(Denmark) Copenhagen	0–3	1–5
İstanbul Başakşehir (Turkey)	10–1	(San Marino) La Fiorita	6–1	4–0
Legia Warsaw (Poland)	11–0	(Wales) Caernarfon Town	6–0	5–0
Dnipro-1 (Ukraine)	0–6	(Hungary) Puskás Akadémia	0–3 (Note: Dnipro-1 forfeited its two matches due to bankruptcy.)	0–3
Žalgiris (Lithuania)	2–4	(Cyprus) Pafos	2–1	0–3 (a.e.t.)
Djurgårdens IF (Sweden)	3–1	(Luxembourg) Progrès Niederkorn	3–0	0–1
Gent (Belgium)	7–1	(Faroe Islands) Víkingur Gøta	4–1	3–0
F91 Dudelange (Luxembourg)	3–12	(Sweden) BK Häcken	2–6	1–6
Hapoel Be'er Sheva (Israel)	2–1	(Bulgaria) Cherno More	0–0	2–1
Hajduk Split (Croatia)	2–0	(Faroe Islands) HB	2–0	0–0
Zrinjski Mostar (Bosnia and Herzegovina)	3–2	(Slovenia) Bravo	0–1	3–1
Riga (Latvia)	2–3	(Poland) Śląsk Wrocław	1–0	1–3
Floriana (Malta)	0–5	(Portugal) Vitória de Guimarães	0–1	0–4
Stjarnan (Iceland)	2–5	(Estonia) Paide Linnameeskond	2–1	0–4
Cliftonville (Northern Ireland)	1–4	(Latvia) Auda	1–2	0–2
St. Gallen (Switzerland)	5–1	(Kazakhstan) Tobol	4–1	1–0
Mladá Boleslav (Czech Republic)	3–0	(Lithuania) TransINVEST	2–0	1–0
Noah (Armenia)	7–0	(Malta) Sliema Wanderers	7–0	0–0
Baník Ostrava (Czech Republic)	7–1	(Armenia) Urartu	5–1	2–0
Zürich (Switzerland)	3–0	(Republic of Ireland) Shelbourne	3–0	0–0
Brøndby (Denmark)	8–2	(Kosovo) Llapi	6–0	2–2
CFR Cluj (Romania)	5–0	(Belarus) Neman Grodno	0–0	5–0
Zimbru Chișinău (Moldova)	1–6	Ararat-Armenia	0–3	1–3
Radnički 1923 (Serbia)	2–2 (3–4 p)	(Montenegro) Mornar	1–0	1–2 (a.e.t.)
Sarajevo (Bosnia and Herzegovina)	0–3	(Slovakia) Spartak Trnava	0–0	0–3
Maccabi Haifa (Israel)	6–6 (2–3 p)	(Azerbaijan) Sabah	0–3	6–3 (a.e.t.)
Paks (Hungary)	5–0	(Cyprus) AEK Larnaca	3–0	2–0
Iberia 1999 (Georgia (country))	2–0	(Albania) Partizani	2–0	0–0
Milsami Orhei (Moldova)	1–2	(Kazakhstan) Astana	1–1	0–1

== Third qualifying round ==
The draw for the third qualifying round was held on 22 July 2024.

=== Seeding ===
A total of 60 teams played in the third qualifying round – eight in the Champions Path and 52 in the Main Path. Seeding of the teams was based on their 2024 UEFA club coefficients. For the winners of the second qualifying round, whose identity was not known at the time of the draw, the club coefficient of the highest-ranked remaining team in each tie was used. For the losers of the Europa League second qualifying round, the club coefficient of the lower-ranked team in each tie was used. Before the draw, UEFA formed groups of seeded and unseeded teams per the principles set by the Club Competitions Committee. The first team drawn in each tie was the home team for the first leg.

Champions Path
Seeded	Unseeded
(Finland) HJK; (Estonia) Flora; (Armenia) Pyunik; (Kosovo) Ballkani	(Montenegro) Dečić; (Northern Ireland) Larne; (Kazakhstan) Ordabasy; (Iceland) Víkingur Reykjavík

Main Path
Group 1		Group 2		Group 3	
Seeded	Unseeded	Seeded	Unseeded	Seeded	Unseeded
(Turkey) İstanbul Başakşehir; (Azerbaijan) Sabah; (Israel) Hapoel Be'er Sheva; (Kazakhstan) Astana; (Hungary) Paks	(Republic of Ireland) St Patrick's Athletic; (Czech Republic) Mladá Boleslav; (Georgia (country)) Iberia 1999; (Montenegro) Mornar; (Romania) Corvinul Hunedoara	(Poland) Legia Warsaw; (Norway) Brann; (Norway) Tromsø; (Croatia) Hajduk Split; (Sweden) BK Häcken	(Scotland) St Mirren; (Scotland) Kilmarnock; (Denmark) Brøndby; (Estonia) Paide Linnameeskond; (Slovakia) Ružomberok	(Romania) CFR Cluj; (Cyprus) Pafos; (Hungary) Puskás Akadémia; (Greece) AEK Athens; (Slovenia) Maribor	(Bulgaria) CSKA 1948; Ararat-Armenia; (Israel) Maccabi Petah Tikva; (Serbia) Vojvodina; (Armenia) Noah
Group 4		Group 5			
Seeded	Unseeded	Seeded	Unseeded		
(Belgium) Gent; (Sweden) Djurgårdens IF; (Portugal) Vitória de Guimarães; (Kosovo) Drita; (Slovakia) Spartak Trnava	(Finland) Ilves; (Switzerland) Zürich; (Denmark) Silkeborg; (Poland) Wisła Kraków; (Latvia) Auda	(Denmark) Copenhagen; (Cyprus) Omonia; (Poland) Śląsk Wrocław; (Slovenia) Olimpija Ljubljana; (Bosnia and Herzegovina) Zrinjski Mostar; (Croatia) Osijek	(Azerbaijan) Zira; (Switzerland) St. Gallen; (Hungary) Fehérvár; (Czech Republic) Baník Ostrava; (Moldova) Sheriff Tiraspol; (Bulgaria) Botev Plovdiv		

Notes

1. ^{†} Winners of the second qualifying round, whose identity was not known at the time of draw. Teams in italics defeated a team with a higher coefficient, thus effectively taking the coefficient of their opponent in the draw.
2. ^{††} Losers of the Europa League second qualifying round, whose identity was not known at the time of draw. Teams in italics lost to a team with a lower coefficient, thus effectively taking the coefficient of their opponent in the draw.

=== Summary ===
The first legs were played on 6, 7 and 8 August, and the second legs were played on 13, 14 and 15 August 2024.

The winners of the ties advanced to the play-off round of their respective path. The losers were eliminated from European competitions for the season.

Third qualifying round
Team 1	Agg.	Team 2	1st leg	2nd leg
Champions Path
Víkingur Reykjavík (Iceland)	3–2	(Estonia) Flora	1–1	2–1
Ordabasy (Kazakhstan)	0–2	(Armenia) Pyunik	0–1	0–1
Ballkani (Kosovo)	1–1 (1–4 p)	(Northern Ireland) Larne	0–1	1–0 (a.e.t.)
HJK (Finland)	2–2 (4–3 p)	(Montenegro) Dečić	1–0	1–2 (a.e.t.)
Main Path
Mladá Boleslav (Czech Republic)	5–3	(Israel) Hapoel Be'er Sheva	1–1	4–2
Kilmarnock (Scotland)	3–2	(Norway) Tromsø	2–2	1–0
Ararat-Armenia	3–4	(Hungary) Puskás Akadémia	0–1	3–3
Zürich (Switzerland)	0–5	(Portugal) Vitória de Guimarães	0–3	0–2
Paks (Hungary)	5–2	(Montenegro) Mornar	3–0	2–2
BK Häcken (Sweden)	7–2	(Estonia) Paide Linnameeskond	6–1	1–1
Maribor (Slovenia)	2–2 (4–2 p)	(Serbia) Vojvodina	2–1	0–1 (a.e.t.)
Spartak Trnava (Slovakia)	4–4 (11–12 p)	(Poland) Wisła Kraków	3–1	1–3 (a.e.t.)
St Patrick's Athletic (Republic of Ireland)	2–0	(Azerbaijan) Sabah	1–0	1–0
St Mirren (Scotland)	2–4	(Norway) Brann	1–1	1–3
CSKA 1948 (Bulgaria)	2–5	(Cyprus) Pafos	2–1	0–4 (a.e.t.)
Ilves (Finland)	2–4	(Sweden) Djurgårdens IF	1–1	1–3
Corvinul Hunedoara (Romania)	2–8	(Kazakhstan) Astana	1–2	1–6
Ružomberok (Slovakia)	1–0	(Croatia) Hajduk Split	0–0	1–0
Noah (Armenia)	3–2	(Greece) AEK Athens	3–1	0–1
Auda (Latvia)	2–3	(Kosovo) Drita	1–0	1–3 (a.e.t.)
Iberia 1999 (Georgia (country))	0–3	(Turkey) İstanbul Başakşehir	0–1	0–2
Brøndby (Denmark)	3–4	(Poland) Legia Warsaw	2–3	1–1
Maccabi Petah Tikva (Israel)	0–2	(Romania) CFR Cluj	0–1	0–1
Silkeborg (Denmark)	4–5	(Belgium) Gent	2–2	2–3 (a.e.t.)
Osijek (Croatia)	3–3 (1–2 p)	(Azerbaijan) Zira	1–1	2–2 (a.e.t.)
St. Gallen (Switzerland)	4–3	(Poland) Śląsk Wrocław	2–0	2–3
Botev Plovdiv (Bulgaria)	2–3	(Bosnia and Herzegovina) Zrinjski Mostar	2–1	0–2
Omonia (Cyprus)	3–0	(Hungary) Fehérvár	1–0	2–0
Copenhagen (Denmark)	1–1 (2–1 p)	(Czech Republic) Baník Ostrava	1–0	0–1 (a.e.t.)
Olimpija Ljubljana (Slovenia)	4–0	(Moldova) Sheriff Tiraspol	3–0	1–0

== Play-off round ==
The draw for the play-off round was held on 5 August 2024.

=== Seeding ===
A total of 48 teams play in the play-off round – 10 in the Champions Path and 38 in the Main Path. Seeding of the teams was based on their 2024 UEFA club coefficients. For the winners of the third qualifying round, whose identity was not known at the time of the draw, the club coefficient of the highest-ranked remaining team in each tie was used. For the losers of the Europa League third qualifying round, the club coefficient of the lower-ranked team in each tie was used. Before the draw, UEFA formed groups of seeded and unseeded teams per the principles set by the Club Competitions Committee. The first team drawn in each tie was the home team for the first leg.

Champions Path
Seeded	Unseeded
(Finland) HJK; (Iceland) Víkingur Reykjavík; (Armenia) Pyunik; (Wales) The New Saints; (Northern Ireland) Larne	(Faroe Islands) KÍ; (Slovenia) Celje; (Gibraltar) Lincoln Red Imps; (Lithuania) Panevėžys; (Andorra) UE Santa Coloma

Main Path
Group 1		Group 2	
Seeded	Unseeded	Seeded	Unseeded
(Denmark) Copenhagen; (Germany) 1. FC Heidenheim; (France) Lens; (Cyprus) Omonia; (Turkey) Trabzonspor	(Azerbaijan) Zira; (Scotland) Kilmarnock; (Switzerland) St. Gallen; (Greece) Panathinaikos; (Sweden) BK Häcken	(Italy) Fiorentina; (Slovenia) Olimpija Ljubljana; (Poland) Legia Warsaw; (Portugal) Vitória de Guimarães; (Kazakhstan) Astana	(Bosnia and Herzegovina) Zrinjski Mostar; (Hungary) Puskás Akadémia; (Norway) Brann; (Kosovo) Drita; (Croatia) Rijeka
Group 3		Group 4	
Seeded	Unseeded	Seeded	Unseeded
(England) Chelsea; (Turkey) İstanbul Başakşehir; (Czech Republic) Mladá Boleslav; (Sweden) Djurgårdens IF; (Belgium) Cercle Brugge	(Slovenia) Maribor; (Switzerland) Servette; (Poland) Wisła Kraków; (Hungary) Paks; (Republic of Ireland) St Patrick's Athletic	(Belgium) Gent; (Spain) Real Betis; (Romania) CFR Cluj; (Armenia) Noah	(Slovakia) Ružomberok; (Serbia) Partizan; (Ukraine) Kryvbas Kryvyi Rih; (Cyprus) Pafos

Notes

1. ^{†} Winners of the third qualifying round, whose identity was not known at the time of draw. Teams in italics defeated a team with a higher coefficient, thus effectively taking the coefficient of their opponent in the draw.
2. ^{††} Losers of the Europa League third qualifying round, whose identity was not known at the time of draw. Teams in italics lost to a team with a lower coefficient, thus effectively taking the coefficient of their opponent in the draw.

=== Summary ===
The first legs were played on 20, 21 and 22 August, and the second legs were played on 28 and 29 August 2024.

The winners of the ties advanced to the league phase. The losers were eliminated from European competitions for the season.

Play-off round
Team 1	Agg.	Team 2	1st leg	2nd leg
Champions Path
Lincoln Red Imps (Gibraltar)	3–4	(Northern Ireland) Larne	2–1	1–3
Pyunik (Armenia)	2–4	(Slovenia) Celje	1–0	1–4
Víkingur Reykjavík (Iceland)	5–0	(Andorra) UE Santa Coloma	5–0	0–0
Panevėžys (Lithuania)	0–3	(Wales) The New Saints	0–3	0–0
KÍ (Faroe Islands)	3–4	(Finland) HJK	2–2	1–2
Main Path
Omonia (Cyprus)	6–1	(Azerbaijan) Zira	6–0	0–1
St. Gallen (Switzerland)	1–1 (5–4 p)	(Turkey) Trabzonspor	0–0	1–1 (a.e.t.)
Lens (France)	2–3	(Greece) Panathinaikos	2–1	0–2
BK Häcken (Sweden)	3–5	(Germany) 1. FC Heidenheim	1–2	2–3
Copenhagen (Denmark)	3–1	(Scotland) Kilmarnock	2–0	1–1
Vitória de Guimarães (Portugal)	7–0	(Bosnia and Herzegovina) Zrinjski Mostar	3–0	4–0
Brann (Norway)	2–3	(Kazakhstan) Astana	2–0	0–3
Legia Warsaw (Poland)	3–0	(Kosovo) Drita	2–0	1–0
Rijeka (Croatia)	1–6	(Slovenia) Olimpija Ljubljana	1–1	0–5
Fiorentina (Italy)	4–4 (5–4 p)	(Hungary) Puskás Akadémia	3–3	1–1 (a.e.t.)
Djurgårdens IF (Sweden)	2–0	(Slovenia) Maribor	1–0	1–0
Wisła Kraków (Poland)	5–7	(Belgium) Cercle Brugge	1–6	4–1
Mladá Boleslav (Czech Republic)	5–2	(Hungary) Paks	2–2	3–0
St Patrick's Athletic (Republic of Ireland)	0–2	(Turkey) İstanbul Başakşehir	0–0	0–2
Chelsea (England)	3–2	(Switzerland) Servette	2–0	1–2
CFR Cluj (Romania)	1–3	(Cyprus) Pafos	1–0	0–3
Partizan (Serbia)	0–2	(Belgium) Gent	0–1	0–1
Kryvbas Kryvyi Rih (Ukraine)	0–5	(Spain) Real Betis	0–2	0–3
Noah (Armenia)	4–3	(Slovakia) Ružomberok	3–0	1–3
