= 2024–25 UEFA Conference League qualifying (first and second round matches) =

European football competition

This page summarises the matches of the first and second qualifying rounds of 2024–25 UEFA Conference League qualifying.

Times are CEST (UTC+2), as listed by UEFA (local times, if different, are in parentheses).

== First qualifying round ==
=== Summary ===
The first legs were played on 10 and 11 July, and the second legs were played on 17 and 18 July 2024.

The winners of the ties advanced to the Main Path second qualifying round. The losers were eliminated from European competitions for the season.

First qualifying round
Team 1	Agg.	Team 2	1st leg	2nd leg
Velež Mostar (Bosnia and Herzegovina)	2–6	(Andorra) Inter Club d'Escaldes	1–1	1–5
Floriana (Malta)	4–2	(San Marino) Tre Penne	3–1	1–1
Torpedo-BelAZ Zhodino (Belarus)	2–4	(Moldova) Milsami Orhei	2–4	0–0
Šiauliai (Lithuania)	0–2	(Estonia) FCI Levadia	0–2	0–0
Bala Town (Wales)	2–3	(Estonia) Paide Linnameeskond	1–2	1–1 (a.e.t.)
La Fiorita (San Marino)	1–1 (4–2 p) (Note: Order of legs reversed after original draw.)	(Belarus) Isloch Minsk Raion	0–1	1–0 (a.e.t.)
Caernarfon Town (Wales)	3–3 (8–7 p)	(Northern Ireland) Crusaders	2–0	1–3 (a.e.t.)
Tallinna Kalev (Estonia)	1–4	(Armenia) Urartu	1–2	0–2
Valur (Iceland)	6–2	(Albania) Vllaznia	2–2	4–0
FCB Magpies (Gibraltar)	3–2	(Republic of Ireland) Derry City	2–0	1–2 (a.e.t.)
Malisheva (Kosovo)	1–3	(Montenegro) Budućnost Podgorica	1–0	0–3
Atlètic Club d'Escaldes (Andorra)	0–3	(Luxembourg) F91 Dudelange	0–1	0–2
Partizani (Albania)	3–2	(Malta) Marsaxlokk	1–1	2–1
Auda (Latvia)	3–0	(Faroe Islands) B36	2–0	1–0
Stjarnan (Iceland)	4–3	(Northern Ireland) Linfield	2–0	2–3
Torpedo Kutaisi (Georgia (country))	2–1	(Albania) Tirana	1–1	1–0
Shelbourne (Republic of Ireland)	3–2	(Gibraltar) St Joseph's	2–1	1–1
Aktobe (Kazakhstan)	3–3 (3–4 p)	(Bosnia and Herzegovina) Sarajevo	0–1	3–2 (a.e.t.)
Bravo (Slovenia)	2–1	(Wales) Connah's Quay Nomads	0–1	2–0 (a.e.t.)
Liepāja (Latvia)	1–3	(Faroe Islands) Víkingur Gøta	1–1	0–2
Noah (Armenia)	4–1	(North Macedonia) Shkëndija	2–0	2–1
Tikvesh (North Macedonia)	4–5	(Iceland) Breiðablik	3–2	1–3
Mornar (Montenegro)	3–2	(Georgia (country)) Dinamo Tbilisi	2–1	1–1
UNA Strassen (Luxembourg)	0–5	(Finland) KuPS	0–0	0–5
VPS (Finland)	1–3	(Lithuania) Žalgiris	1–2	0–1

=== Matches ===
10 July 2024
20:00

Velež Mostar (Bosnia and Herzegovina)	1–1	(Andorra) Inter Club d'Escaldes
Lohan 65'	Report	Joanet 34'

Stadion Grbavica, Sarajevo (Note: Velež Mostar played their home match at the Stadion Grbavica in Sarajevo, instead of their regular stadium, the Stadion Rođeni, in Mostar, which did not meet UEFA requirements.)
Attendance: 3,831
Referee: Jacob Karlsen (Denmark)
18 July 2024
18:00

Inter Club d'Escaldes (Andorra)	5–1	(Bosnia and Herzegovina) Velež Mostar
Lopez 44', 45+2'; Domi 57', 84'; Andreu 90+2'	Report	Oreč 53'

Estadi Nacional, Andorra la Vella
Attendance: 422
Referee: Alan Kijas (Austria)

Inter Club d'Escaldes won 6–2 on aggregate.

11 July 2024
19:00

Floriana (Malta)	3–1	(San Marino) Tre Penne
Nwoko 55'; Vella 57'; Thiaguinho 63'	Report	Guidi 50'

Tony Bezzina Stadium, Paola
Attendance: 625
Referee: Florian Lata (Albania)
18 July 2024
20:45

Tre Penne (San Marino)	1–1	(Malta) Floriana
Boccioletti 60'	Report	Grech 90+5'

San Marino Stadium, Serravalle
Attendance: 362
Referee: Rustam Omarov (Kazakhstan)

Floriana won 4–2 on aggregate.

11 July 2024
20:00

Torpedo-BelAZ Zhodino (Belarus)	2–4	(Moldova) Milsami Orhei
Pobudey 33'; Sharkovskiy 89'	Report	Camara 20'; Spătaru 30', 50'; Premudrov 80' (o.g.)

Kiraly Sportcentre, Szombathely, Hungary (Note: Due to the country's involvement in the Russian invasion of Ukraine, Belarusian teams were required to play their home matches at neutral venues and behind closed doors until further notice.)
Attendance: 0
Referee: Miloš Savović (Montenegro)
18 July 2024
18:00 (19:00 UTC+3)

Milsami Orhei (Moldova)	0–0	(Belarus) Torpedo-BelAZ Zhodino
	Report

CSR Orhei, Orhei
Attendance: 3,000
Referee: Bence Csonka (Hungary)

Milsami Orhei won 4–2 on aggregate.

11 July 2024
17:00 (18:00 UTC+3)

Šiauliai (Lithuania)	0–2	(Estonia) FCI Levadia
	Report	Musaba 7'; Felicio 23'

Savivaldybė Stadium, Šiauliai
Attendance: 1,735
Referee: Mervan Bejtullahu (Kosovo)
18 July 2024
18:00 (19:00 UTC+3)

FCI Levadia (Estonia)	0–0	(Lithuania) Šiauliai
	Report

Lilleküla Stadium, Tallinn
Attendance: 1,198
Referee: Lukasz Kuzma (Poland)

FCI Levadia won 2–0 on aggregate.

11 July 2024
20:00 (19:00 UTC+1)

Bala Town (Wales)	1–2	(Estonia) Paide Linnameeskond
Ukek 90+5' (pen.)	Report	Ceesay 64'; Medić 90+2'

Park Hall, Oswestry, England (Note: Bala Town played their home match at Park Hall, Oswestry, England, instead of their regular stadium, Maes Tegid, in Bala, which did not meet UEFA requirements.)
Attendance: 476
Referee: Matthew MacDermid (Scotland)
18 July 2024
18:30 (19:30 UTC+3)

Paide Linnameeskond (Estonia)	1–1 (a.e.t.)	(Wales) Bala Town
Hõim 120'	Report	Peate 12'

Pärnu Rannastaadion, Pärnu (Note: Paide played their home matches at the Pärnu Rannastaadion in Pärnu and Lilleküla Stadium in Tallinn, instead of their regular stadium, Paide linnastaadion, in Paide, which did not meet UEFA requirements.)
Attendance: 1,259
Referee: Danilo Nikolić (Serbia)

Paide Linnameeskond won 3–2 on aggregate.

11 July 2024
20:45

La Fiorita (San Marino)	0–1	(Belarus) Isloch Minsk Raion
	Report	Butsko 34'

San Marino Stadium, Serravalle
Attendance: 217
Referee: Jasmin Sabotic (Luxembourg)
18 July 2024
19:30

Isloch Minsk Raion (Belarus)	0–1 (a.e.t.)	(San Marino) La Fiorita
	Report	J. Semprini 87'
Penalties
Rovdo (penalty scored); Kovel (penalty missed); Sibilev (penalty missed); Zhuravlev (penalty scored)	2–4	(penalty scored) Casolla; (penalty scored) Cicarelli; (penalty missed) Guerri; (penalty scored) Olcese; (penalty scored) Pezzi

Mezőkövesdi Városi Stadion, Mezőkövesd, Hungary
Attendance: 20
Referee: Jovan Kachevski (North Macedonia)

1–1 on aggregate; La Fiorita won 4–2 on penalties.

11 July 2024
19:30 (18:30 UTC+1)

Caernarfon Town (Wales)	2–0	(Northern Ireland) Crusaders
Owen 4'; Clarke 37'	Report

Nantporth, Bangor (Note: Caernarfon Town played their home matches at Nantporth in Bangor, instead of their regular stadium, The Oval, in Caernarfon, which did not meet UEFA requirements.)
Attendance: 1,088
Referee: Rob Harvey (Republic of Ireland)
17 July 2024
20:45 (19:45 UTC+1)

Crusaders (Northern Ireland)	3–1 (a.e.t.)	(Wales) Caernarfon Town
Kennedy 47'; Larmour 49'; Lowry 72'	Report	Mendes 24'
Penalties
Kennedy (penalty scored); Forsythe (penalty scored); Larmour (penalty scored); Boyd (penalty scored); Teelan (penalty scored); O'Rourke (penalty scored); Lowry (penalty scored); Barr (penalty missed); Owens (penalty missed)	7–8	(penalty scored) Gosset; (penalty scored) Mendes; (penalty scored) Owen; (penalty scored) Clarke; (penalty scored) Faux; (penalty scored) McMullan; (penalty scored) Downey; (penalty missed) G. Williams; (penalty scored) M. Williams

Seaview, Belfast
Attendance: 2,184
Referee: Heini Ziskason Viðoy (Faroe Islands)

3–3 on aggregate; Caernarfon Town won 8–7 on penalties.

11 July 2024
18:30 (19:30 UTC+3)

Tallinna Kalev (Estonia)	1–2	(Armenia) Urartu
Teeväli 11'	Report	Movsesyan 28', 77'

Kadriorg Stadium, Tallinn
Attendance: 1,217
Referee: Dmytro Kubriak (Ukraine)
18 July 2024
17:00 (19:00 UTC+4)

Urartu (Armenia)	2–0	(Estonia) Tallinna Kalev
Mirzoyan 12', 49'	Report

Urartu Stadium, Yerevan
Attendance: 2,200
Referee: Pavle Ilić (Serbia)

Urartu won 4–1 on aggregate.

11 July 2024
21:00 (19:00 UTC+0)

Valur (Iceland)	2–2	(Albania) Vllaznia
Tryggvason 12'; Heimisson 90+9'	Report	Krymi 23'; Dodaj 85'

Hlíðarendi, Reykjavík
Attendance: 754
Referee: Tim Marshall (Northern Ireland)
18 July 2024
18:00

Vllaznia (Albania)	0–4	(Iceland) Valur
	Report	K. Sigurðsson 13'; Tryggvason 16'; Pedersen 36'; Haraldsson 68'

Loro Boriçi Stadium, Shkodër
Attendance: 3,500
Referee: Simone Sozza (Italy)

Valur won 6–2 on aggregate.

11 July 2024
18:00

FCB Magpies (Gibraltar)	2–0	(Republic of Ireland) Derry City
Taylor 49'; Zúñiga 82'	Report

Europa Sports Park, Gibraltar (Note: Teams from Gibraltar played their home matches at Europa Sports Park, instead of the Victoria Stadium, due to renovation works.)
Attendance: 725
Referee: Rob Jenkins (Wales)
18 July 2024
20:45 (19:45 UTC+1)

Derry City (Republic of Ireland)	2–1 (a.e.t.)	(Gibraltar) FCB Magpies
Connolly 38'; Hoban 57'	Report	De Haro 111'

Ryan McBride Brandywell Stadium, Derry
Attendance: 2,568
Referee: Antoine Paul Chiaramonti (Andorra)

FCB Magpies won 3–2 on aggregate.

11 July 2024
17:00

Malisheva (Kosovo)	1–0	(Montenegro) Budućnost Podgorica
Brruti 67'	Report

Zahir Pajaziti Stadium, Podujevo (Note: Malisheva played their home match at the Zahir Pajaziti Stadium in Podujevo, instead of their regular stadium, the Liman Gegaj Stadium, in Malisheva, which did not meet UEFA requirements.)
Attendance: 701
Referee: Martin Matoša (Slovenia)
18 July 2024
21:00

Budućnost Podgorica (Montenegro)	3–0	(Kosovo) Malisheva
Ivanović 32'; Grivić 56'; Perišić 89'	Report

Podgorica City Stadium, Podgorica
Attendance: 3,900
Referee: Mihály Káprály (Hungary)

Budućnost Podgorica won 3–1 on aggregate.

11 July 2024
18:30

Atlètic Club d'Escaldes (Andorra)	0–1	(Luxembourg) F91 Dudelange
	Report	Bojić 17'

Estadi Nacional, Andorra la Vella
Attendance: 198
Referee: Paul McLaughlin (Republic of Ireland)
18 July 2024
19:00

F91 Dudelange (Luxembourg)	2–0	(Andorra) Atlètic Club d'Escaldes
Hadji 60' (pen.), 79'	Report

Stade Jos Nosbaum, Dudelange
Attendance: 1,105
Referee: Kadir Sağlam (Turkey)

F91 Dudelange won 3–0 on aggregate.

11 July 2024
20:00

Partizani (Albania)	1–1	(Malta) Marsaxlokk
Murataj 2'	Report	Yuri 15'

Elbasan Arena, Elbasan (Note: Partizani played their home matches at the Elbasan Arena in Elbasan, instead of their regular stadium, the Arena e Demave in Tirana, which did not meet UEFA requirements.)
Attendance: 1,000
Referee: Roman Jitari (Moldova)
18 July 2024
19:00

Marsaxlokk (Malta)	1–2	(Albania) Partizani
Yuri 46'	Report	Cara 48'; Keko 90+3'

Centenary Stadium, Ta' Qali
Attendance: 748
Referee: Igor Stojchevski (North Macedonia)

Partizani won 3–2 on aggregate.

10 July 2024
21:00 (22:00 UTC+3)

Auda (Latvia)	2–0	(Faroe Islands) B36
Taiwo 12'; Traore 85'	Report

Skonto Stadium, Riga (Note: Auda played their home matches at the Skonto Stadium in Riga, instead of their regular stadium, the Audas stadions, in Kekava, which did not meet UEFA requirements.)
Attendance: 554
Referee: Damian Kos (Poland)
17 July 2024
19:00 (18:00 UTC+1)

B36 (Faroe Islands)	0–1	(Latvia) Auda
	Report	Talla 62'

Tórsvøllur, Tórshavn
Attendance: 627
Referee: Oliver Reitala (Finland)

Auda won 3–0 on aggregate.

11 July 2024
21:00 (19:00 UTC+0)

Stjarnan (Iceland)	2–0	(Northern Ireland) Linfield
Atlason 22'; McKee 60' (o.g.)	Report

Stjörnuvöllur, Garðabær
Attendance: 682
Referee: Iwan Griffith (Wales)
18 July 2024
20:45 (19:45 UTC+1)

Linfield (Northern Ireland)	3–2	(Iceland) Stjarnan
Kristjánsson 7' (o.g.); Orr 70'; Fitzpatrick 76'	Report	Atlason 57'; Halldórsson 88'

Windsor Park, Belfast
Attendance: 3,046
Referee: Granit Maqedonci (Sweden)

Stjarnan won 4–3 on aggregate.

11 July 2024
19:00 (21:00 UTC+4)

Torpedo Kutaisi (Georgia (country))	1–1	(Albania) Tirana
Mici 20' (o.g.)	Report	Haxhiu 87'

Ramaz Shengelia Stadium, Kutaisi
Attendance: 8,633
Referee: Zaven Hovhannisyan (Armenia)
18 July 2024
20:00

Tirana (Albania)	0–1	(Georgia (country)) Torpedo Kutaisi
	Report	Johnsen 3'

Elbasan Arena, Elbasan (Note: Tirana played their home match at the Elbasan Arena in Elbasan, instead of their regular stadium, the Selman Stërmasi Stadium in Tirana, which did not meet UEFA requirements.)
Attendance: 1,800
Referee: Dalibor Černý (Czech Republic)

Torpedo Kutaisi won 2–1 on aggregate.

11 July 2024
20:45 (19:45 UTC+1)

Shelbourne (Republic of Ireland)	2–1	(Gibraltar) St Joseph's
Coyle 1'; Jarvis 58' (pen.)	Report	Javi Paul 40'

Tolka Park, Dublin
Attendance: 3,655
Referee: Luís Teixeira (Andorra)
18 July 2024
18:00

St Joseph's (Gibraltar)	1–1	(Republic of Ireland) Shelbourne
Walker 25'	Report	Bone 34'

Europa Sports Park, Gibraltar
Attendance: 763
Referee: Ladislav Szikszay (Czech Republic)

Shelbourne won 3–2 on aggregate.

11 July 2024
17:00 (20:00 UTC+5)

Aktobe (Kazakhstan)	0–1	(Bosnia and Herzegovina) Sarajevo
	Report	Kyeremeh 90'

Central Stadium, Aktobe
Attendance: 12,400
Referee: Ivo Torres (Luxembourg)
18 July 2024
21:00

Sarajevo (Bosnia and Herzegovina)	2–3 (a.e.t.)	(Kazakhstan) Aktobe
Guliashvili 57'; Oliveira 96'	Report	Umayev 41'; Tanzharikov 75'; Jean 93'
Penalties
Anđušić (penalty missed); Mehmedović (penalty scored); Oliveira (penalty scored); Julardžija (penalty scored); Duraković (penalty scored)	4–3	(penalty missed) Romero; (penalty scored) Tanzharikov; (penalty scored) Jean; (penalty missed) Samorodov; (penalty scored) Kasym

Koševo City Stadium, Sarajevo
Attendance: 21,667
Referee: Zorbay Küçük (Turkey)

3–3 on aggregate; Sarajevo won 4–3 on penalties.

11 July 2024
18:00

Bravo (Slovenia)	0–1	(Wales) Connah's Quay Nomads
	Report	Maher 83'

Šiška Sports Park, Ljubljana
Attendance: 1,100
Referee: Sivert Øksnes Amland (Norway)
18 July 2024
19:30 (18:30 UTC+1)

Connah's Quay Nomads (Wales)	0–2 (a.e.t.)	(Slovenia) Bravo
	Report	Jakšić 88'; Poplatnik 116'

Nantporth, Bangor (Note: Connah's Quay Nomads played their home match at Nantporth in Bangor, instead of their regular stadium, Deeside Stadium, in Connah's Quay, which did not meet UEFA requirements.)
Attendance: 775
Referee: Ben McMaster (Northern Ireland)

Bravo won 2–1 on aggregate.

11 July 2024
17:00 (18:00 UTC+3)

Liepāja (Latvia)	1–1	(Faroe Islands) Víkingur Gøta
Simić 55'	Report	Kallsberg 21'

Daugava Stadium, Liepāja
Attendance: 1,762
Referee: Tom Owen (Wales)
18 July 2024
20:00 (19:00 UTC+1)

Víkingur Gøta (Faroe Islands)	2–0	(Latvia) Liepāja
Kallsberg 30'; Justinussen 43'	Report

Við Djúpumýrar, Klaksvík (Note: Víkingur Gøta played their home matches at Við Djúpumýrar in Klaksvík, instead of their regular stadium, Sarpugerði, in Norðragøta, which did not meet UEFA requirements.)
Attendance: 905
Referee: Joakim Östling (Sweden)

Víkingur Gøta won 3–1 on aggregate.

11 July 2024
18:00 (20:00 UTC+4)

Noah (Armenia)	2–0	(North Macedonia) Shkëndija
Gregório 81'; Miljković 90'	Report

Abovyan City Stadium, Abovyan (Note: Noah played their home matches at the Abovyan City Stadium in Abovyan, instead of their regular stadium, the Armavir City Stadium, in Armavir, which did not meet UEFA requirements.)
Attendance: 3,100
Referee: Viktor Shimusik (Belarus)
18 July 2024
20:00

Shkëndija (North Macedonia)	1–2	(Armenia) Noah
Cake 53'	Report	Miljković 20'; Pinson 90+1'

Toše Proeski Arena, Skopje (Note: Shkëndija played their home match at the Toše Proeski Arena in Skopje, instead of their regular stadium, the Ecolog Arena, in Tetovo, which did not meet UEFA requirements.)
Attendance: 2,350
Referee: Dominik Starý (Czech Republic)

Noah won 4–1 on aggregate.

11 July 2024
20:30

Tikvesh (North Macedonia)	3–2	(Iceland) Breiðablik
Stojkoski 74'; Stojanov 80'; Léo Guerra 83'	Report	V. Einarsson 13'; Kristinsson 31'

Toše Proeski Arena, Skopje (Note: Tikvesh played their home match at the Toše Proeski Arena in Skopje, instead of their regular stadium, the Gradski Stadion Kavadarci, in Kavadarci, which did not meet UEFA requirements.)
Attendance: 2,872
Referee: Jérémy Muller (Luxembourg)
18 July 2024
21:15 (19:15 UTC+0)

Breiðablik (Iceland)	3–1	(North Macedonia) Tikvesh
Steindórsson 44'; Gunnlaugsson 53'; Mojsov 85' (o.g.)	Report	Spahiu 9'

Kópavogsvöllur, Kópavogur
Attendance: 816
Referee: Peiman Simani (Finland)

Breiðablik won 5–4 on aggregate.

11 July 2024
20:45

Mornar (Montenegro)	2–1	(Georgia (country)) Dinamo Tbilisi
Đurišić 20'; Vušurović 23'	Report	Ugrekhelidze 90+4'

DG Arena, Podgorica (Note: Mornar Bar played their home matches at the DG Arena and the Podgorica City Stadium in Podgorica, instead of their regular stadium, the Stadion Topolica, in Bar, which did not meet UEFA requirements.)
Attendance: 650
Referee: Georgi Ginchev (Bulgaria)
18 July 2024
19:00 (21:00 UTC+4)

Dinamo Tbilisi (Georgia (country))	1–1	(Montenegro) Mornar
Salia 33'	Report	Zorić 57'

Mikheil Meskhi Stadium, Tbilisi
Attendance: 4,000
Referee: Ion Orlic (Moldova)

Mornar won 3–2 on aggregate.

11 July 2024
19:00

UNA Strassen (Luxembourg)	0–0	(Finland) KuPS
	Report

Stade Municipal de la Ville de Differdange, Differdange (Note: UNA Strassen played their home match at the Stade Municipal de la Ville de Differdange in Differdange, instead of their regular stadium, the Complexe Sportif Jean Wirtz, in Strassen, which did not meet UEFA requirements.)
Attendance: 1,046
Referee: Helgi Mikael Jónasson (Iceland)
18 July 2024
17:00 (18:00 UTC+3)

KuPS (Finland)	5–0	(Luxembourg) UNA Strassen
Ruoppi 17', 20'; Vidjeskog 48'; Diawara 75'; Heinonen 90+1'	Report

Kuopio Football Stadium, Kuopio
Attendance: 2,790
Referee: Ian McNabb (Northern Ireland)

KuPS won 5–0 on aggregate.

11 July 2024
19:00 (20:00 UTC+3)

VPS (Finland)	1–2	(Lithuania) Žalgiris
Ahiabu 59'	Report	Fofana 25'; Kendysh 90+4'

Hietalahti Stadium, Vaasa
Attendance: 3,580
Referee: Jóhan Hendrik Ellefsen (Faroe Islands)
18 July 2024
18:00 (19:00 UTC+3)

Žalgiris (Lithuania)	1–0	(Finland) VPS
Fofana 45+4'	Report

LFF Stadium, Vilnius
Attendance: 4,377
Referee: Bahattin Simsek (Turkey)

Žalgiris won 3–1 on aggregate.

== Second qualifying round ==
=== Summary ===
The first legs were played on 23, 24 and 25 July, and the second legs were played on 30, 31 July and 1 August 2024.

The winners of the ties advanced to the third qualifying round of their respective path. The losers were eliminated from European competitions for the season.

Second qualifying round
Team 1	Agg.	Team 2	1st leg	2nd leg
Champions Path
HJK (Finland)	Bye	N/A	—	—
Larne (Northern Ireland)	Bye	N/A	—	—
Differdange 03 (Luxembourg)	4–4 (3–4 p)	(Kazakhstan) Ordabasy	1–0	3–4 (a.e.t.)
Víkingur Reykjavík (Iceland)	2–1	(Albania) Egnatia	0–1	2–0
Virtus (San Marino)	2–5	(Estonia) Flora	0–0	2–5 (a.e.t.)
Struga (North Macedonia)	3–4	(Armenia) Pyunik	2–1	1–3
Dinamo Batumi (Georgia (country))	0–2	(Montenegro) Dečić	0–2	0–0
Ballkani (Kosovo)	2–0	(Malta) Hamrun Spartans	0–0	2–0
Main Path
Go Ahead Eagles (Netherlands)	1–2	(Norway) Brann	0–0	1–2
Omonia (Cyprus)	5–2	(Georgia (country)) Torpedo Kutaisi	3–1	2–1
Breiðablik (Iceland)	1–3	(Kosovo) Drita	1–2	0–1
Osijek (Croatia)	6–1	(Estonia) FCI Levadia	5–1	1–0
Olimpija Ljubljana (Slovenia)	4–1	(Ukraine) Polissya Zhytomyr	2–0	2–1
AEK Athens (Greece)	8–3	(Andorra) Inter Club d'Escaldes	4–3	4–0
KuPS (Finland)	0–2	(Norway) Tromsø	0–1	0–1
Valur (Iceland)	1–4	(Scotland) St Mirren	0–0	1–4
Sumgayit (Azerbaijan)	1–2	(Hungary) Fehérvár	1–2	0–0
Ilves (Finland)	5–5 (5–4 p)	Austria Wien	2–1	3–4 (a.e.t.)
CSKA 1948 (Bulgaria)	2–1	(Montenegro) Budućnost Podgorica	1–0	1–1 (a.e.t.)
Zira (Azerbaijan)	6–1	(Slovakia) DAC Dunajská Streda	4–0	2–1
Maribor (Slovenia)	4–3	(Romania) Universitatea Craiova	2–0	2–3
St Patrick's Athletic (Republic of Ireland)	5–3	(Liechtenstein) Vaduz	3–1	2–2
FCB Magpies (Gibraltar)	1–8 (Note: Order of legs reversed after original draw.)	(Denmark) Copenhagen	0–3	1–5
İstanbul Başakşehir (Turkey)	10–1	(San Marino) La Fiorita	6–1	4–0
Legia Warsaw (Poland)	11–0	(Wales) Caernarfon Town	6–0	5–0
Dnipro-1 (Ukraine)	0–6	(Hungary) Puskás Akadémia	0–3 (Note: Dnipro-1 forfeited its two matches due to bankruptcy.)	0–3
Žalgiris (Lithuania)	2–4	(Cyprus) Pafos	2–1	0–3 (a.e.t.)
Djurgårdens IF (Sweden)	3–1	(Luxembourg) Progrès Niederkorn	3–0	0–1
Gent (Belgium)	7–1	(Faroe Islands) Víkingur Gøta	4–1	3–0
F91 Dudelange (Luxembourg)	3–12	(Sweden) BK Häcken	2–6	1–6
Hapoel Be'er Sheva (Israel)	2–1	(Bulgaria) Cherno More	0–0	2–1
Hajduk Split (Croatia)	2–0	(Faroe Islands) HB	2–0	0–0
Zrinjski Mostar (Bosnia and Herzegovina)	3–2	(Slovenia) Bravo	0–1	3–1
Riga (Latvia)	2–3	(Poland) Śląsk Wrocław	1–0	1–3
Floriana (Malta)	0–5	(Portugal) Vitória de Guimarães	0–1	0–4
Stjarnan (Iceland)	2–5	(Estonia) Paide Linnameeskond	2–1	0–4
Cliftonville (Northern Ireland)	1–4	(Latvia) Auda	1–2	0–2
St. Gallen (Switzerland)	5–1	(Kazakhstan) Tobol	4–1	1–0
Mladá Boleslav (Czech Republic)	3–0	(Lithuania) TransINVEST	2–0	1–0
Noah (Armenia)	7–0	(Malta) Sliema Wanderers	7–0	0–0
Baník Ostrava (Czech Republic)	7–1	(Armenia) Urartu	5–1	2–0
Zürich (Switzerland)	3–0	(Republic of Ireland) Shelbourne	3–0	0–0
Brøndby (Denmark)	8–2	(Kosovo) Llapi	6–0	2–2
CFR Cluj (Romania)	5–0	(Belarus) Neman Grodno	0–0	5–0
Zimbru Chișinău (Moldova)	1–6	Ararat-Armenia	0–3	1–3
Radnički 1923 (Serbia)	2–2 (3–4 p)	(Montenegro) Mornar	1–0	1–2 (a.e.t.)
Sarajevo (Bosnia and Herzegovina)	0–3	(Slovakia) Spartak Trnava	0–0	0–3
Maccabi Haifa (Israel)	6–6 (2–3 p)	(Azerbaijan) Sabah	0–3	6–3 (a.e.t.)
Paks (Hungary)	5–0	(Cyprus) AEK Larnaca	3–0	2–0
Iberia 1999 (Georgia (country))	2–0	(Albania) Partizani	2–0	0–0
Milsami Orhei (Moldova)	1–2	(Kazakhstan) Astana	1–1	0–1

=== Champions Path matches ===
23 July 2024
19:00

Differdange 03 (Luxembourg)	1–0	(Kazakhstan) Ordabasy
Jorginho 37'	Report

Stade Municipal de la Ville de Differdange, Differdange
Attendance: 1,526
Referee: Mohammad Usmam Aslam (Norway)
1 August 2024
17:00 (20:00 UTC+5)

Ordabasy (Kazakhstan)	4–3 (a.e.t.)	(Luxembourg) Differdange 03
Brusco 24' (o.g.); Tagybergen 55'; Sadovsky 82'; Tursynbay 117' (pen.)	Report	Trani 2'; Jorginho 59', 120'
Penalties
Cvek (penalty scored); Abiken (penalty scored); Umarov (penalty missed); Islamkhan (penalty scored); Tursynbay (penalty missed); Sadovsky (penalty scored)	4–3	(penalty scored) Jorginho; (penalty missed) Rauch; (penalty scored) Rychelmy; (penalty scored) Gustavo Simões; (penalty missed) Bei; (penalty missed) El Idrissi

Kazhimukan Munaitpasov Stadium, Shymkent
Attendance: 6,570
Referee: Marek Radina (Czech Republic)

4–4 on aggregate; Ordabasy won 4–3 on penalties.

25 July 2024
20:45 (18:45 UTC+0)

Víkingur Reykjavík (Iceland)	0–1	(Albania) Egnatia
	Report	Dramé 33'

Víkingsvöllur, Reykjavík
Attendance: 711
Referee: Jóhan Hendrik Ellefsen (Faroe Islands)
1 August 2024
21:00

Egnatia (Albania)	0–2	(Iceland) Víkingur Reykjavík
	Report	Dulysse 28' (o.g.); Þrándarson 48'

Loro Boriçi Stadium, Shkodër (Note: Egnatia played their home match at the Loro Boriçi Stadium in Shkodër, instead of their regular stadium, the Egnatia Arena, in Rrogozhinë, due to 2024 European heatwaves and the lack of floodlights.)
Attendance: 600
Referee: Fábio Veríssimo (Portugal)

Víkingur Reykjavík won 2–1 on aggregate.

23 July 2024
21:00

Virtus (San Marino)	0–0	(Estonia) Flora
	Report

San Marino Stadium, Serravalle
Attendance: 271
Referee: Dragomir Draganov (Bulgaria)
30 July 2024
18:00 (19:00 UTC+3)

Flora (Estonia)	5–2 (a.e.t.)	(San Marino) Virtus
Lepik 4' (pen.); Sappinen 77' (pen.); Alliku 92', 97'; Kreida 120'	Report	Benincasa 68'; Mema 88'

Lilleküla Stadium, Tallinn
Attendance: 1,388
Referee: Snir Levy (Israel)

Flora won 5–2 on aggregate.

24 July 2024
17:00

Struga (North Macedonia)	2–1	(Armenia) Pyunik
Ibraimi 8' (pen.); Spirovski 73'	Report	Villela 23' (pen.)

SRC Biljanini Izvori, Ohrid (Note: Struga played their home match at the SRC Biljanini Izvori in Ohrid, instead of their regular stadium, the Gradska Plaža Stadium, in Struga, which did not meet UEFA requirements.)
Attendance: 1,242
Referee: Luís Teixeira (Andorra)
30 July 2024
18:00 (20:00 UTC+4)

Pyunik (Armenia)	3–1	(North Macedonia) Struga
Déblé 16'; Kovalenko 45', 90+6'	Report	Ibraimi 45+4'

Vazgen Sargsyan Republican Stadium, Yerevan
Attendance: 6,421
Referee: Sigurd Kringstad (Norway)

Pyunik won 4–3 on aggregate.

24 July 2024
19:00 (21:00 UTC+4)

Dinamo Batumi (Georgia (country))	0–2	(Montenegro) Dečić
	Report	Camaj 62'; Striković 66'

Adjarabet Arena, Batumi
Attendance: 10,637
Referee: Sayat Karabayev (Kazakhstan)
30 July 2024
21:00

Dečić (Montenegro)	0–0	(Georgia (country)) Dinamo Batumi
	Report

Camp FSCG, Podgorica (Note: Dečić played their home matches at the Camp FSCG and the Podgorica City Stadium in Podgorica, instead of their regular stadium, the Stadion Tuško Polje, in Tuzi, which did not meet UEFA requirements.)
Attendance: 1,050
Referee: Jason Barcelo (Gibraltar)

Dečić won 2–0 on aggregate.

23 July 2024
18:00

Ballkani (Kosovo)	0–0	(Malta) Hamrun Spartans
	Report

Zahir Pajaziti Stadium, Podujevo (Note: Ballkani played their home matches at the Zahir Pajaziti Stadium in Podujevo and the Fadil Vokrri Stadium in Pristina, instead of their regular stadium, the Suva Reka City Stadium, in Suva Reka, which did not meet UEFA requirements.)
Attendance: 900
Referee: Walter Altmann (Austria)
30 July 2024
20:00

Hamrun Spartans (Malta)	0–2	(Kosovo) Ballkani
	Report	Hamidi 64'; Karrica 76' (pen.)

Tony Bezzina Stadium, Paola
Attendance: 1,183
Referee: Michele Beltrano (San Marino)

Ballkani won 2–0 on aggregate.

=== Main Path matches ===
25 July 2024
18:30

Go Ahead Eagles (Netherlands)	0–0	(Norway) Brann
	Report

De Adelaarshorst, Deventer
Attendance: 8,877
Referee: Denys Shurman (Ukraine)
1 August 2024
19:00

Brann (Norway)	2–1	(Netherlands) Go Ahead Eagles
Finne 42'; Knudsen 62'	Report	Tengstedt 2'

Brann Stadion, Bergen
Attendance: 14,055
Referee: Edgars Maļcevs (Latvia)

Brann won 2–1 on aggregate.

25 July 2024
18:30 (19:30 UTC+3)

Omonia (Cyprus)	3–1	(Georgia (country)) Torpedo Kutaisi
Coulibaly 41', 78'; Ewandro 84'	Report	Yansané 75'

GSP Stadium, Nicosia
Attendance: 12,308
Referee: Martin Matoša (Slovenia)
1 August 2024
19:00 (21:00 UTC+4)

Torpedo Kutaisi (Georgia (country))	1–2	(Cyprus) Omonia
Yansané 47'	Report	Stępiński 25'; Semedo 81' (pen.)

Ramaz Shengelia Stadium, Kutaisi
Attendance: 8,578
Referee: Ishmael Barbara (Malta)

Omonia won 5–2 on aggregate.

25 July 2024
21:15 (19:15 UTC+0)

Breiðablik (Iceland)	1–2	(Kosovo) Drita
Þorvaldsson 71'	Report	Manaj 2'; Tusha 23'

Kópavogsvöllur, Kópavogur
Attendance: 914
Referee: Jan Petřík (Czech Republic)
30 July 2024
17:00

Drita (Kosovo)	1–0	(Iceland) Breiðablik
Selmani 66'	Report

Zahir Pajaziti Stadium, Podujevo (Note: Drita played their home matches at the Zahir Pajaziti Stadium in Podujevo and the Fadil Vokrri Stadium in Pristina, instead of their regular stadium, the Gjilan City Stadium, in Gjilan, which did not meet UEFA requirements.)
Attendance: 782
Referee: Kamal Umudlu (Azerbaijan)

Drita won 3–1 on aggregate.

25 July 2024
20:00

Osijek (Croatia)	5–1	(Estonia) FCI Levadia
Miérez 9', 18', 27'; Guedes 34'; Bukvić 68'	Report	Yakovlev 8'

Opus Arena, Osijek
Attendance: 8,028
Referee: Jacob Karlsen (Denmark)
1 August 2024
18:00 (19:00 UTC+3)

FCI Levadia (Estonia)	0–1	(Croatia) Osijek
	Report	Pušić 63'

Lilleküla Stadium, Tallinn
Attendance: 896
Referee: Menelaos Antoniou (Cyprus)

Osijek won 6–1 on aggregate.

25 July 2024
19:00

Olimpija Ljubljana (Slovenia)	2–0	(Ukraine) Polissya Zhytomyr
Florucz 56'; Pinto 90+2'	Report

Stožice Stadium, Ljubljana
Attendance: 3,572
Referee: Javier Alberola Rojas (Spain)
1 August 2024
18:00

Polissya Zhytomyr (Ukraine)	1–2	(Slovenia) Olimpija Ljubljana
Kushnirenko 1'	Report	Florucz 11'; Durdov 90+3'

Piotr Wieczorek Municipal Stadium, Gliwice, Poland (Note: Due to the Russian invasion of Ukraine, Ukrainian teams were required to play their home matches at neutral venues until further notice.)
Attendance: 1,296
Referee: Miloš Milanović (Serbia)

Olimpija Ljubljana won 4–1 on aggregate.

24 July 2024
20:00 (21:00 UTC+3)

AEK Athens (Greece)	4–3	(Andorra) Inter Club d'Escaldes
Ljubičić 6'; García 20'; Gaćinović 31'; Moukoudi 53'	Report	Vida 65' (o.g.); Andreu 78' (pen.); Martínez 83'

Agia Sophia Stadium, Athens
Attendance: 19,766
Referee: Lothar D'hondt (Belgium)
1 August 2024
18:30

Inter Club d'Escaldes (Andorra)	0–4	(Greece) AEK Athens
	Report	García 29', 74', 86'; Amrabat 83'

Estadi Nacional, Andorra la Vella
Attendance: 870
Referee: Ondřej Berka (Czech Republic)

AEK Athens won 8–3 on aggregate.

25 July 2024
17:00 (18:00 UTC+3)

KuPS (Finland)	0–1	(Norway) Tromsø
	Report	Nordås 54'

Kuopio Football Stadium, Kuopio
Attendance: 2,678
Referee: Iwan Griffith (Wales)
1 August 2024
19:00

Tromsø (Norway)	1–0	(Finland) KuPS
Hjertø-Dahl 29'	Report

Alfheim Stadion, Tromsø
Attendance: 4,881
Referee: Jasper Vergoote (Belgium)

Tromsø won 2–0 on aggregate.

25 July 2024
20:45 (18:45 UTC+0)

Valur (Iceland)	0–0	(Scotland) St Mirren
	Report

Hlíðarendi, Reykjavík
Attendance: 1,200
Referee: Damian Kos (Poland)
1 August 2024
20:45 (19:45 UTC+1)

St Mirren (Scotland)	4–1	(Iceland) Valur
Rooney 16'; Olusanya 52'; O'Hara 65'; Iacovitti 87'	Report	Haraldsson 75' (pen.)

St Mirren Park, Paisley
Attendance: 6,715
Referee: Mikkel Redder (Denmark)

St Mirren won 4–1 on aggregate.

25 July 2024
18:00 (20:00 UTC+4)

Sumgayit (Azerbaijan)	1–2	(Hungary) Fehérvár
Abdullazade 20'	Report	Christensen 39'; Spandler 52'

Sumgayit City Stadium, Sumgait
Attendance: 9,200
Referee: Florian Lata (Albania)
31 July 2024
19:00

Fehérvár (Hungary)	0–0	(Azerbaijan) Sumgayit
	Report

Sóstói Stadion, Székesfehérvár
Attendance: 4,204
Referee: Kristoffer Karlsson (Sweden)

Fehérvár won 2–1 on aggregate.

25 July 2024
18:00 (19:00 UTC+3)

Ilves (Finland)	2–1	Austria Wien
Haarala 51'; Riski 88'	Report	Lucas Galvão 90'

Tammelan Stadion, Tampere
Attendance: 6,870
Referee: Alejandro Muñiz Ruiz (Spain)
31 July 2024
20:30

Austria Wien	4–3 (a.e.t.)	(Finland) Ilves
Malone 22'; Gruber 27'; Barry 68'; Prelec 97'	Report	Ala-Myllymäki 30'; Mäenpää 90'; Söderbäck 102'
Penalties
Fischer (penalty scored); Galvão (penalty scored); Pérez Vinlöf (penalty scored); Meisl (penalty scored); Fitz (penalty missed)	4–5	(penalty scored) Arifi; (penalty scored) Popovitch; (penalty scored) Haarala; (penalty scored) Pikkarainen; (penalty scored) Riski

Franz Horr Stadium, Vienna
Attendance: 8,555
Referee: Ian McNabb (Northern Ireland)

5–5 on aggregate; Ilves won 5–4 on penalties.

25 July 2024
19:30 (20:30 UTC+3)

CSKA 1948 (Bulgaria)	1–0	(Montenegro) Budućnost Podgorica
Karagaren 44'	Report

Vasil Levski National Stadium, Sofia (Note: CSKA 1948 played their home matches at the Vasil Levski National Stadium, instead of their regular stadium, the Stadion Bistritsa, which did not meet UEFA requirements.)
Attendance: 458
Referee: Irakli Kvirikashvili (Georgia)
1 August 2024
21:00

Budućnost Podgorica (Montenegro)	1–1 (a.e.t.)	(Bulgaria) CSKA 1948
Perišić 65'	Report	Serdyuk 102'

DG Arena, Podgorica (Note: Budućnost played their home match at the DG Arena, instead of their regular stadium, the City Stadium Podgorica, which was suspended by UEFA delegates due to drought.)
Attendance: 1,300
Referee: Michal Očenáš (Slovakia)

CSKA 1948 won 2–1 on aggregate.

25 July 2024
17:30 (19:30 UTC+4)

Zira (Azerbaijan)	4–0	(Slovakia) DAC Dunajská Streda
Utzig 29'; Júnior 31'; Volkovi 51', 53'	Report

Dalga Arena, Baku (Note: Zira played their home matches at the Dalga Arena in Baku, instead of their regular stadium, the Zira Olympic Sport Complex Stadium, in Zirə, which did not meet UEFA requirements.)
Attendance: 2,150
Referee: Ivo Torres (Luxembourg)
1 August 2024
20:30

DAC Dunajská Streda (Slovakia)	1–2	(Azerbaijan) Zira
Méndez 40'	Report	Utzig 25'; Alıyev 57' (pen.)

MOL Aréna, Dunajská Streda
Attendance: 3,754
Referee: Jovan Kachevski (North Macedonia)

Zira won 6–1 on aggregate.

25 July 2024
20:15

Maribor (Slovenia)	2–0	(Romania) Universitatea Craiova
J. Repas 57'; Jakupović 88'	Report

Ljudski vrt, Maribor
Attendance: 5,500
Referee: Mads Kristoffersen (Denmark)
1 August 2024
19:00 (20:00 UTC+3)

Universitatea Craiova (Romania)	3–2	(Slovenia) Maribor
Mitriță 52'; Grego 72'; Koljić 90+5'	Report	Iličić 68'; Jakupović 82'

Ion Oblemenco Stadium, Craiova
Attendance: 18,620
Referee: Jasmin Sabotic (Luxembourg)

Maribor won 4–3 on aggregate.

25 July 2024
20:45 (19:45 UTC+1)

St Patrick's Athletic (Republic of Ireland)	3–1	(Liechtenstein) Vaduz
Mulraney 6', 17'; Redmond 77'	Report	Del Toro 65'

Richmond Park, Dublin
Attendance: 2,388
Referee: Tom Owen (Wales)
1 August 2024
19:30

Vaduz (Liechtenstein)	2–2	(Republic of Ireland) St Patrick's Athletic
Cavegn 22' (pen.), 76'	Report	Elbouzedi 28'; Palmer 81'

Rheinpark Stadion, Vaduz
Attendance: 1,405
Referee: Ashot Ghaltakhchyan (Armenia)

St Patrick's Athletic won 5–3 on aggregate.

25 July 2024
18:00

FCB Magpies (Gibraltar)	0–3	(Denmark) Copenhagen
	Report	Elyounoussi 30'; Claesson 62'; Froholdt 65'

Europa Sports Park, Gibraltar
Attendance: 750
Referee: Cláudio Pereira (Portugal)
1 August 2024
19:00

Copenhagen (Denmark)	5–1	(Gibraltar) FCB Magpies
Diks 40' (pen.); Froholdt 54'; Óskarsson 61', 84'; Højer 80'	Report	Bayode 16'

Parken Stadium, Copenhagen
Attendance: 16,595
Referee: Dumitri Muntean (Moldova)

Copenhagen won 8–1 on aggregate.

25 July 2024
19:45 (20:45 UTC+3)

İstanbul Başakşehir (Turkey)	6–1	(San Marino) La Fiorita
Özcan 5'; Davidson 13'; Figueiredo 29', 49'; Kemen 43'; Piątek 71'	Report	Greco 58'

Başakşehir Fatih Terim Stadium, Istanbul
Attendance: 3,814
Referee: Miloš Bošković (Montenegro)
1 August 2024
20:45

La Fiorita (San Marino)	0–4	(Turkey) İstanbul Başakşehir
	Report	Piątek 13', 90+1'; Şahiner 31'; Güreler 35'

San Marino Stadium, Serravalle
Attendance: 265
Referee: Granit Maqedonci (Sweden)

İstanbul Başakşehir won 10–1 on aggregate.

25 July 2024
20:45

Legia Warsaw (Poland)	6–0	(Wales) Caernarfon Town
Gual 22', 48', 53'; Morishita 44'; Kramer 71'; Gonçalves 90+3'	Report

Polish Army Stadium, Warsaw
Attendance: 0 (Note: The Legia Warsaw v Caernarfon Town match was played behind closed doors.)
Referee: Juri Frischer (Estonia)
1 August 2024
20:45 (19:45 UTC+1)

Caernarfon Town (Wales)	0–5	(Poland) Legia Warsaw
	Report	Kapustka 46'; Jędrzejczyk 48'; Pekhart 54'; Nsame 72'; Barcia 83'

Nantporth, Bangor
Attendance: 863
Referee: Ívar Orri Kristjánsson (Iceland)

Legia Warsaw won 11–0 on aggregate.

25 July 2024
19:00

Dnipro-1 (Ukraine)	0–3 Awarded (Note: Dnipro-1 forfeited its two matches due to bankruptcy.)	(Hungary) Puskás Akadémia
	Report

Košická futbalová aréna, Košice, Slovakia
Referee: Kyriakos Athanasiou (Cyprus)
1 August 2024
21:00

Puskás Akadémia (Hungary)	3–0 Awarded	(Ukraine) Dnipro-1
	Report

Pancho Aréna, Felcsút
Referee: Bahattin Simsek (Turkey)

Puskás Akadémia won 6–0 on aggregate.

25 July 2024
18:00 (19:00 UTC+3)

Žalgiris (Lithuania)	2–1	(Cyprus) Pafos
Antal 17', 26'	Report	Moutachy 62' (o.g.)

LFF Stadium, Vilnius
Attendance: 3,865
Referee: Kristoffer Hagenes (Norway)
1 August 2024
18:00 (19:00 UTC+3)

Pafos (Cyprus)	3–0 (a.e.t.)	(Lithuania) Žalgiris
Tanković 21'; Anderson Silva 101'; Dragomir 118'	Report

Alphamega Stadium, Limassol (Note: Pafos played their home matches at the Alphamega Stadium in Limassol, instead of their regular stadium, the Stelios Kyriakides Stadium, in Paphos, which did not meet UEFA requirements.)
Attendance: 3,223
Referee: Stefan Ebner (Austria)

Pafos won 4–2 on aggregate.

25 July 2024
19:00

Djurgårdens IF (Sweden)	3–0	(Luxembourg) Progrès Niederkorn
Wikheim 21'; Hümmet 27', 61'	Report

Tele2 Arena, Stockholm
Attendance: 15,089
Referee: Alessandro Dudic (Switzerland)
1 August 2024
19:00

Progrès Niederkorn (Luxembourg)	1–0	(Sweden) Djurgårdens IF
Karamoko 3'	Report

Stade Municipal de la Ville de Differdange, Differdange (Note: Progrès Niederkorn played their home match at the Stade Municipal de la Ville de Differdange in Differdange, instead of their regular stadium, the Stade Jos Haupert, in Niederkorn, which did not meet UEFA requirements.)
Attendance: 1,900
Referee: Goga Kikacheishvili (Georgia)

Djurgårdens IF won 3–1 on aggregate.

25 July 2024
20:00

Gent (Belgium)	4–1	(Faroe Islands) Víkingur Gøta
Hong Hyun-seok 25', 88'; Kums 59'; De Sart 68' (pen.)	Report	Nielsen 13'

Planet Group Arena, Ghent
Attendance: 7,821
Referee: Vilhjalmur Thorarinsson (Iceland)
1 August 2024
19:45 (18:45 UTC+1)

Víkingur Gøta (Faroe Islands)	0–3	(Belgium) Gent
	Report	Mitrović 64'; Fernandez-Pardo 69'; Dean 76' (pen.)

Við Djúpumýrar, Klaksvík
Attendance: 428
Referee: Mihály Káprály (Hungary)

Gent won 7–1 on aggregate.

25 July 2024
19:00

F91 Dudelange (Luxembourg)	2–6	(Sweden) BK Häcken
Hadji 32' (pen.), 44' (pen.)	Report	Inoussa 6'; Layouni 21', 45+1'; Youssef 35', 60'; Hrstić 88'

Stade Jos Nosbaum, Dudelange
Attendance: 1,136
Referee: Antoni Bandić (Bosnia and Herzegovina)
31 July 2024
19:00

BK Häcken (Sweden)	6–1	(Luxembourg) F91 Dudelange
Decker 16' (o.g.); Agbonifo 27'; Hrstić 45', 48'; Nioule 53'; Hammar 57'	Report	Bojić 4'

Hisingen Arena, Gothenburg
Attendance: 2,061
Referee: Igor Stojchevski (North Macedonia)

BK Häcken won 12–3 on aggregate.

25 July 2024
19:00 (20:00 UTC+3)

Hapoel Be'er Sheva (Israel)	0–0	(Bulgaria) Cherno More
	Report

Gradski stadion, Lovech, Bulgaria (Note: Due to the Gaza war, Israeli teams were required to play their home matches at neutral venues until further notice.)
Attendance: 700
Referee: Daniyar Sakhi (Kazakhstan)
1 August 2024
19:30 (20:30 UTC+3)

Cherno More (Bulgaria)	1–2	(Israel) Hapoel Be'er Sheva
Calcan 33'	Report	Lopes 25', 64'

Huvepharma Arena, Razgrad (Note: Cherno More played their home match at the Huvepharma Arena in Razgrad, instead of their regular stadium, Stadion Ticha, in Varna, which did not meet UEFA requirements.)
Attendance: 3,243
Referee: Danilo Nikolić (Serbia)

Hapoel Be'er Sheva won 2–1 on aggregate.

25 July 2024
21:00

Hajduk Split (Croatia)	2–0	(Faroe Islands) HB
Uremović 19'; Livaja 30' (pen.)	Report

Stadion Poljud, Split
Attendance: 28,488
Referee: Matthew De Gabriele (Malta)
1 August 2024
21:00 (20:00 UTC+1)

HB (Faroe Islands)	0–0	(Croatia) Hajduk Split
	Report

Tórsvøllur, Tórshavn (Note: HB Tórshavn played their home match at Tórsvøllur, instead of their regular stadium, Gundadalur, which did not meet UEFA requirements.)
Attendance: 1,395
Referee: Tim Marshall (Northern Ireland)

Hajduk Split won 2–0 on aggregate.

25 July 2024
21:00

Zrinjski Mostar (Bosnia and Herzegovina)	0–1	(Slovenia) Bravo
	Report	Ivanšek 16'

Stadion pod Bijelim Brijegom, Mostar
Attendance: 5,500
Referee: Lionel Tschudi (Switzerland)
1 August 2024
17:00

Bravo (Slovenia)	1–3	(Bosnia and Herzegovina) Zrinjski Mostar
Tučić 21'	Report	Mulahusejnović 16'; Jakovljević 66'; Mlinar 80'

Šiška Sports Park, Ljubljana
Attendance: 1,800
Referee: Joonas Jaanovits (Estonia)

Zrinjski Mostar won 3–2 on aggregate.

24 July 2024
18:00 (19:00 UTC+3)

Riga (Latvia)	1–0	(Poland) Śląsk Wrocław
Niang 7'	Report

Skonto Stadium, Riga
Attendance: 6,013
Referee: Christian-Petru Ciochirca (Austria)
1 August 2024
20:30

Śląsk Wrocław (Poland)	3–1	(Latvia) Riga
Nahuel 6' (pen.), 52'; Petrov 49'	Report	Babec 33'

Wrocław Stadium, Wrocław
Attendance: 20,723
Referee: Genc Nuza (Kosovo)

Śląsk Wrocław won 3–2 on aggregate.

25 July 2024
19:00

Floriana (Malta)	0–1	(Portugal) Vitória de Guimarães
	Report	Jota 78'

Tony Bezzina Stadium, Paola
Attendance: 569
Referee: Ben McMaster (Northern Ireland)
1 August 2024
21:15 (20:15 UTC+1)

Vitória de Guimarães (Portugal)	4–0	(Malta) Floriana
Kaio César 8'; Fernandes 11'; Mangas 37', 43'	Report

Estádio D. Afonso Henriques, Guimarães
Attendance: 20,101
Referee: Ion Orlic (Moldova)

Vitória de Guimarães won 5–0 on aggregate.

25 July 2024
21:00 (19:00 UTC+0)

Stjarnan (Iceland)	2–1	(Estonia) Paide Linnameeskond
Atlason 24', 73'	Report	Kristal 55'

Stjörnuvöllur, Garðabær
Attendance: 561
Referee: Jérémy Müller (Luxembourg)
1 August 2024
18:30 (19:30 UTC+3)

Paide Linnameeskond (Estonia)	4–0	(Iceland) Stjarnan
He. Ojamaa 29'; Saarma 46'; Ceesay 57'; Lilander 85'	Report

Pärnu Rannastaadion, Pärnu
Attendance: 1,380
Referee: Antoine Paul Chiaramonti (Andorra)

Paide Linnameeskond won 5–2 on aggregate.

24 July 2024
20:45 (19:45 UTC+1)

Cliftonville (Northern Ireland)	1–2	(Latvia) Auda
Conlan 39'	Report	Ogunniyi 32'; Taiwo 78'

Solitude, Belfast
Attendance: 2,000
Referee: Helgi Mikael Jónasson (Iceland)
31 July 2024
19:00 (20:00 UTC+3)

Auda (Latvia)	2–0	(Northern Ireland) Cliftonville
Ogunniyi 51'; Taiwo 61'	Report

Skonto Stadium, Riga
Attendance: 1,103
Referee: Dominik Starý (Czech Republic)

Auda won 4–1 on aggregate.

25 July 2024
20:00

St. Gallen (Switzerland)	4–1	(Kazakhstan) Tobol
Stevanović 35'; Akolo 39'; Toma 77'; Vallçi 90+7'	Report	Vallçi 28' (o.g.)

Kybunpark, St. Gallen
Attendance: 11,300
Referee: Rob Harvey (Republic of Ireland)
1 August 2024
18:00 (21:00 UTC+5)

Tobol (Kazakhstan)	0–1	(Switzerland) St. Gallen
	Report	Cissé 73'

Kostanay Central Stadium, Kostanay
Attendance: 5,842
Referee: Joni Hyytiä (Finland)

St. Gallen won 5–1 on aggregate.

25 July 2024
18:00

Mladá Boleslav (Czech Republic)	2–0	(Lithuania) TransINVEST
Ladra 27'; Kušej 38'	Report

Lokotrans Aréna, Mladá Boleslav
Attendance: 3,916
Referee: Patrik Kolarić (Croatia)
1 August 2024
18:00 (19:00 UTC+3)

TransINVEST (Lithuania)	0–1	(Czech Republic) Mladá Boleslav
	Report	Vojta 78'

LFF Stadium, Vilnius
Attendance: 1,200
Referee: Matthew MacDermid (Scotland)

Mladá Boleslav won 3–0 on aggregate.

25 July 2024
18:00 (20:00 UTC+4)

Noah (Armenia)	7–0	(Malta) Sliema Wanderers
Pinson 19'; Gregório 28', 31', 56'; Çinari 72'; Alcino 73' (o.g.); Ferreira 90+1'	Report

Abovyan City Stadium, Abovyan
Attendance: 3,100
Referee: Roman Jitari (Moldova)
1 August 2024
19:00

Sliema Wanderers (Malta)	0–0	(Armenia) Noah
	Report

National Stadium, Ta' Qali
Attendance: 247
Referee: Rob Jenkins (Wales)

Noah won 7–0 on aggregate.

25 July 2024
19:00

Baník Ostrava (Czech Republic)	5–1	(Armenia) Urartu
Ewerton 15'; Boula 22'; Buchta 26'; Prekop 61'; Klíma 82' (pen.)	Report	Tarakhchyan 90+4'

Městský stadion, Ostrava
Attendance: 13,553
Referee: Mervan Bejtullahu (Kosovo)
1 August 2024
17:00 (19:00 UTC+4)

Urartu (Armenia)	0–2	(Czech Republic) Baník Ostrava
	Report	Ewerton 22'; Chaluš 51'

Urartu Stadium, Yerevan
Attendance: 1,700
Referee: Bulat Sariyev (Kazakhstan)

Baník Ostrava won 7–1 on aggregate.

25 July 2024
19:00

Zürich (Switzerland)	3–0	(Republic of Ireland) Shelbourne
Onyedika 1'; Marchesano 29', 58'	Report

Letzigrund, Zürich
Attendance: 8,676
Referee: Visar Kastrati (Kosovo)
1 August 2024
20:45 (19:45 UTC+1)

Shelbourne (Republic of Ireland)	0–0	(Switzerland) Zürich
	Report

Tolka Park, Dublin
Attendance: 3,655
Referee: Robertas Valikonis (Lithuania)

Zürich won 3–0 on aggregate.

25 July 2024
19:00

Brøndby (Denmark)	6–0	(Kosovo) Llapi
Suzuki 16'; Omoijuanfo 20'; Bundgaard 24'; Nartey 40'; Kvistgaarden 88'; Schwartau 90'	Report

Brøndby Stadium, Brøndbyvester
Attendance: 17,926
Referee: David Dickinson (Scotland)
1 August 2024
17:00

Llapi (Kosovo)	2–2	(Denmark) Brøndby
Gashijan 42'; Mikkelsen 66' (o.g.)	Report	Yeboah 53'; Omoijuanfo 61' (pen.)

Zahir Pajaziti Stadium, Podujevo
Attendance: 900
Referee: Oliver Reitala (Finland)

Brøndby won 8–2 on aggregate.

25 July 2024
19:30 (20:30 UTC+3)

CFR Cluj (Romania)	0–0	(Belarus) Neman Grodno
	Report

Dr. Constantin Rădulescu Stadium, Cluj-Napoca
Attendance: 5,366
Referee: Miloš Gigovic (Bosnia and Herzegovina)
1 August 2024
20:00

Neman Grodno (Belarus)	0–5	(Romania) CFR Cluj
	Report	Muhar 17'; Bîrligea 40', 57'; Korenica 60'; Nkololo 90+3'

Alcufer Stadion, Győr, Hungary
Attendance: 10
Referee: Andreas Argyrou (Cyprus)

CFR Cluj won 5–0 on aggregate.

25 July 2024
18:45 (19:45 UTC+3)

Zimbru Chișinău (Moldova)	0–3	Ararat-Armenia
	Report	Serobyan 23' (pen.); Ocansey 74', 89'

Stadionul Zimbru, Chişinău
Attendance: 3,676
Referee: Fran Jović (Croatia)
1 August 2024
17:00 (19:00 UTC+4)

Ararat-Armenia	3–1	(Moldova) Zimbru Chișinău
Yenne 28'; Serobyan 68' (pen.); Duarte 88'	Report	Ohajunwa 62'

Yerevan Football Academy Stadium, Yerevan
Attendance: 1,380
Referee: Aristotelis Diamantopoulos (Greece)

Ararat-Armenia won 6–1 on aggregate.

25 July 2024
20:00

Radnički 1923 (Serbia)	1–0	(Montenegro) Mornar
Aleksić 72'	Report

Dubočica Stadium, Leskovac (Note: Radnički 1923 played their home match at the Dubočica Stadium in Leskovac, instead of their regular stadium, the Čika Dača Stadium, in Kragujevac, which did not meet UEFA requirements.)
Attendance: 3,191
Referee: Ioannis Papadopoulos (Greece)
31 July 2024
20:45

Mornar (Montenegro)	2–1 (a.e.t.)	(Serbia) Radnički 1923
Ondong 45', 83'	Report	Aleksić 90+8'
Penalties
Đurišić (penalty missed); Ćetković (penalty scored); Kishi (penalty scored); Kaluđerović (penalty scored); Mitrović (penalty scored)	4–3	(penalty scored) Evandro; (penalty missed) Ristić; (penalty missed) Simović; (penalty scored) Aleksić; (penalty scored) Vidosavljević

DG Arena, Podgorica
Attendance: 1,200
Referee: Gal Leibovitz (Israel)

2–2 on aggregate; Mornar won 4–3 on penalties.

25 July 2024
21:00

Sarajevo (Bosnia and Herzegovina)	0–0	(Slovakia) Spartak Trnava
	Report

Koševo City Stadium, Sarajevo
Attendance: 26,756
Referee: Bram Van Driessche (Belgium)
31 July 2024
20:30

Spartak Trnava (Slovakia)	3–0	(Bosnia and Herzegovina) Sarajevo
Ďuriš 15', 42'; Karhan 90+4'	Report

Anton Malatinský Stadium, Trnava
Attendance: 9,120
Referee: Sandi Putros (Denmark)

Spartak Trnava won 3–0 on aggregate.

25 July 2024
19:45

Maccabi Haifa (Israel)	0–3	(Azerbaijan) Sabah
	Report	Šafranko 61'; Sekidika 78'; Aliyev 88'

Kisvárdai Stadion, Kisvárda, Hungary
Attendance: 270
Referee: Nathan Verboomen (Belgium)
1 August 2024
18:00 (20:00 UTC+4)

Sabah (Azerbaijan)	3–6 (a.e.t.)	(Israel) Maccabi Haifa
Šafranko 47'; Parris 71'; Mickels 103'	Report	Haziza 17'; Pierrot 67', 90'; Šimić 70'; Refaelov 73'; David 112'
Penalties
Chakla (penalty scored); Mickels (penalty missed); Aliyev (penalty scored); Lepinjica (penalty scored)	3–2	(penalty scored) Refaelov; (penalty scored) David; (penalty missed) Saief; (penalty missed) Saba; (penalty missed) Pierrot

Bank Respublika Arena, Masazır
Attendance: 8,000
Referee: Peter Kralovič (Slovakia)

6–6 on aggregate; Sabah won 3–2 on penalties.

25 July 2024
20:00

Paks (Hungary)	3–0	(Cyprus) AEK Larnaca
Haraszti 17'; Tóth 61'; Ötvös 74'	Report

Fehérvári úti Stadion, Paks
Attendance: 2,277
Referee: Dennis Higler (Netherlands)
1 August 2024
18:00 (19:00 UTC+3)

AEK Larnaca (Cyprus)	0–2	(Hungary) Paks
	Report	Haraszti 19'; Papp 42'

AEK Arena – Georgios Karapatakis, Larnaca
Attendance: 3,249
Referee: Luca Cibelli (Switzerland)

Paks won 5–0 on aggregate.

25 July 2024
18:00 (20:00 UTC+4)

Iberia 1999 (Georgia (country))	2–0	(Albania) Partizani
Nonikashvili 31' (pen.); Sylla 57'	Report

Mikheil Meskhi Stadium, Tbilisi
Attendance: 4,500
Referee: Andrei Chivulete (Romania)
1 August 2024
20:00

Partizani (Albania)	0–0	(Georgia (country)) Iberia 1999
	Report

Elbasan Arena, Elbasan
Attendance: 1,163
Referee: Jamie Robinson (Northern Ireland)

Iberia 1999 won 2–0 on aggregate.

25 July 2024
18:00 (19:00 UTC+3)

Milsami Orhei (Moldova)	1–1	(Kazakhstan) Astana
Lupano 90'	Report	Gripshi 58'

CSR Orhei, Orhei
Attendance: 3,000
Referee: Nikola Popov (Bulgaria)
1 August 2024
16:00 (19:00 UTC+5)

Astana (Kazakhstan)	1–0	(Moldova) Milsami Orhei
Tomasov 50'	Report

Almaty Central Stadium, Almaty (Note: Astana played their home matches at the Almaty Central Stadium in Almaty, instead of their regular stadium, the Astana Arena, in Astana, due to renovation works.)
Attendance: 7,362
Referee: Ruddy Buquet (France)

Astana won 2–1 on aggregate.
