= Filip Bojić =

Croatian footballer (born 1992)

Personal information
- Date of birth: 5 October 1992 (age 34)
- Place of birth: Zagreb, Croatia
- Height: 1.90 m (6 ft 3 in)
- Position: Midfielder

Team information
- Current team: Rodange
- Number: 10

Senior career*
Years	Team	Apps	(Gls)
–2013	NK Trnje		
2014	SV Neuberg	14	(1)
2014–2016	NK Rudeš	57	(8)
2016	RNK Split	7	(0)
2017–2019	Union Titus Pétange	45	(15)
2019	Virton		
2020–2025	F91 Dudelange	117	(19)
2025–	Rodange	27	(4)
- * Club domestic league appearances and goals as of 13 June 2026

Filip Bojić (born 5 October 1992) is a Croatian professional footballer who plays as a midfielder for Rodange.

== Early life ==
Bojić has been a supporter of Croatian side Dinamo (Zagreb).

== Career ==
In 2014, Bojić signed for Croatian side NK Rudeš, where he was regarded as one of the club's most important players, before signing for Croatian side RNK Split, where he was regarded to have had a poor performance for the club and experienced delayed payments. In 2017, he signed for Luxembourgish side Union Titus Pétange, where he was regarded as one of the club's most important players. He was also regarded as one of the highest performing players in the league. In 2019, he signed for Belgian side R.E. Virton. He then spent months as a free agent due to the coronavirus pandemic. In 2020, he signed for Luxembourgish side F91 Dudelange, where he was regarded as one of the club's most important players. He helped them win the league.

== Style of play ==
Bojić mainly operates as a midfielder and is known for his ability to retain possession of the ball.

== Personal life ==
Bojić is a native of Zagreb, Croatia.
