= Chris Ondong Mba =

French footballer (born 1993)

Chris Marlon Ondong-Mba
Personal information
- Full name: Chris Marlon Ondong Mba
- Date of birth: 7 August 1993 (age 33)
- Place of birth: Poitiers, France
- Height: 1.85 m (6 ft 1 in)
- Position: Winger

Team information
- Current team: Sabah
- Number: 7

Senior career*
Years	Team	Apps	(Gls)
2011–2014	Stade Poitevin		
2014–2015	Tournai	9	(0)
2015–2016	Izegem	10	(0)
2017–2018	Goole		
2018	Matlock Town		
2018–2019	iClinic Sereď	5	(1)
2020	Ventspils	18	(1)
2022	Ermis Aradippou FC		
2022–2023	Mladost DG	19	(3)
2023–2024	Mornar	29	(7)
2024–2025	Ħamrun Spartans	8	(2)
2025	Yanbian Longding	6	(0)
2026–	Sabah	0	(0)
- * Club domestic league appearances and goals as of 22:45, 31 Jan 2026 (UTC)

Chris Marlon Ondong Mba (born 7 August 1993) is a French professional footballer who plays as a winger for Malaysian side Sabah. He played in lower leagues of France, Belgium and England before playing professionally in Slovakia, Latvia, Montenegro and Malta.

== Career ==
A Stade Poitevin youth product, Ondong Mba played for Tournai and Izegem in Belgium.

In November 2020 he played in the 2020 Latvian Cup final for Ventspils. Ventspils lost the match to FK Liepāja 1–0 after extra-time.
