= List of Lithuanian football transfers winter 2018–19 =

This is a list of transfers in Lithuanian football for the 2018–19 winter transfer window. Only confirmed moves featuring an A Lyga side are listed.

The winter transfer window opens on January 1, 2019, and will close on February 23, 2019. Deals may be signed at any given moment in the season, but the actual transfer may only take place during the transfer window. Unattached players may sign at any moment.

== Transfers In ==
Date	Name	Moving from	Moving to	Type	Source
5 November 2018	(Colombia) Sebastián Vásquez	DFK Dainava	Panevėžys	Free	
1 December 2018	(Lithuania) Eligijus Jankauskas	(Czech Republic) SFC Opava	Sūduva	Undisclosed	
6 December 2018	(Lithuania) Simonas Urbys	Palanga	Žalgiris	Free	
10 December 2018	(Lithuania) Lukas Čerkauskas	Stumbras	Panevėžys	Free	
12 December 2018	(Lithuania) Gratas Sirgėdas	Kauno Žalgiris	Sūduva	Free	
14 December 2018	(Lithuania) Dominykas Galkevičius	Stumbras	Kauno Žalgiris	Free	
14 December 2018	(Lithuania) Deividas Šešplaukis	Pakruojis	Kauno Žalgiris	Free	
19 December 2018	(Lithuania) Tautvydas Eliošius	Jonava	Panevėžys	Free	
20 December 2018	(Croatia) Tomislav Kiš	(Croatia) Dugopolje	Žalgiris	Undisclosed	
27 December 2018	(Lithuania) Matas Vareika	NFA	Žalgiris	Free	
28 December 2018	(Lithuania) Dominykas Barauskas	Žalgiris	Sūduva	Free	
7 January 2019	(Lithuania) Tomas Mikuckis	(Latvia) Spartaks Jūrmala	Kauno Žalgiris	Free	
11 January 2019	(Belarus) Pavel Kruk	(Belarus) UAS Zhitkovichi	Panevėžys	Free	
14 January 2019	(Lithuania) Sigitas Urbys	Palanga	Panevėžys	Free	
14 January 2019	(Russia) Aleksandr Yerkin	(Russia) Druzhba Maykop	Panevėžys	Free	
15 January 2019	(North Macedonia) Mevlan Adili	(North Macedonia) Shkëndija	Žalgiris	Free	
17 January 2019	(Lithuania) Martynas Dapkus	Jonava	Kauno Žalgiris	Free	
18 January 2019	(Spain) Cristian Portilla	(Canada) Ottawa Fury	Žalgiris	Free	
21 January 2019	(Lithuania) Egidijus Vaitkūnas	(Belarus) Minsk	Kauno Žalgiris	Free	
22 January 2019	(Spain) Víctor Pérez	(India) Bengaluru	Žalgiris	Free	
23 January 2018	(Lithuania) Modestas Vorobjovas	Trakai	Žalgiris	Free	
23 January 2019	(Lithuania) Šarūnas Jurevičius	(Norway) Bjørnevatn IL	Panevėžys	Free	
23 January 2019	(Lithuania) Ričardas Šveikauskas	Palanga	Trakai	Free	
24 January 2019	(Lithuania) Sigitas Olberkis	(Latvia) Jelgava	Žalgiris	Free	
26 January 2018	(Canada) Tosaint Ricketts	(Canada) Toronto FC	Sūduva	Free	
29 January 2019	(Brazil) Rafael Ledesma	(Malta) San Ġwann	Panevėžys	Free	
30 January 2019	(Lithuania) Tadas Eliošius	Nevėžis	Panevėžys	Free	
31 January 2018	(Russia) Idris Umayev	(Russia) Akhmat Grozny	Palanga	Loan	
1 February 2019	(Lithuania) Paulius Golubickas	DFK Dainava	Sūduva	Loan	
2 February 2019	(Lithuania) Benas Anisas	Džiugas	Kauno Žalgiris	Free	

== Transfers Out ==
Date	Name	Moving from	Moving to	Type	Source
22 October 2018	(South Africa) Kgaogelo Sekgota	Stumbras	(Portugal) Vitória de Setúbal	Undisclosed	
4 November 2018	(Lithuania) Deividas Česnauskis	Trakai	–	Retired	
13 November 2018	(Brazil) Bruno Dybal	Sūduva	Free Market	Released	
13 November 2018	(Lithuania) Julius Kasparavičius	Sūduva	(Estonia) Narva Trans	Free	
13 November 2018	(Curaçao) Rigino Cicilia	Sūduva	Free Market	Released	
20 November 2018	(Russia) Vadim Manzon	Trakai	Free Market	Released	
20 November 2018	(Belgium) Etienne Mukanya	Trakai	(Romania) Dunărea Călărași	Free	
20 November 2018	(Lithuania) Dominykas Kodz	Žalgiris	Free Market	Released	
20 November 2018	(Brazil) Marquinhos Carioca	Žalgiris	Free Market	Released	
20 November 2018	(Chile) Diego Oyarzún	Žalgiris	(Chile) Coquimbo Unido	Free	
20 November 2018	(Nigeria) Ogana Louis	Žalgiris	Free Market	Released	
20 November 2018	(Slovakia) Tomáš Malec	Žalgiris	Free Market	Released	
22 November 2018	(Senegal) Mamadou Mbodj	Žalgiris	(Azerbaijan) Neftchi Baku	Free	
6 December 2018	(Belgium) Kevin Ntika	Trakai	(Armenia) Ararat Yerevan	Free	
14 December 2018	(Liberia) Oscar Dorley	Trakai	(Czech Republic) Slovan Liberec	Undisclosed	
16 December 2018	(Croatia) Slavko Blagojević	Žalgiris	(Latvia) Rīgas Futbola Skola	Free	
27 December 2018	(France) Jeremy Manzorro	Žalgiris	(Kazakhstan) Irtysh Pavlodar	Undisclosed	
28 December 2018	(Lithuania) Aurimas Raginis	Kauno Žalgiris	Free Market	Released	
28 December 2018	(Belarus) Illya Kalpachuk	Kauno Žalgiris	(Belarus) Rukh Brest	Free	
7 January 2019	(Canada) Joseph Di Chiara	Jonava	(Canada) York 9 FC	Free	
8 January 2019	(Austria) Daniel Offenbacher	Sūduva	(Romania) Hermannstadt	Undisclosed	
9 January 2019	(Lithuania) Vilius Armalas	Stumbras	(Portugal) Benfica B	Undisclosed	
11 January 2019	(Lithuania) Linas Klimavičius	Žalgiris	(Romania) Dinamo București	Free	
11 January 2019	(Belarus) Vital Hayduchyk	Sūduva	(Belarus) Torpedo-BelAZ Zhodino	Free	
11 January 2019	(France) Alassane N'Diaye	Sūduva	Free Market	Released	
15 January 2019	(Lithuania) Tomas Snapkauskas	Kauno Žalgiris	Free Market	Released	
15 January 2019	(Lithuania) Justinas Marazas	Trakai	(Poland) Wisła Płock	Loan	
16 January 2019	(Guinea) Ibrahima Soumah	Stumbras	(Portugal) Vitória de Setúbal	Undisclosed	
25 January 2019	(Russia) Yevgeni Osipov	Trakai	(Estonia) FCI Levadia	Free	
28 January 2019	(Lithuania) Vaidotas Šilėnas	Trakai	Free Market	Released	
28 January 2019	(Brazil) Michael Thuíque	Jonava	(Brazil) Nacional	Free	
1 February 2019	(Russia) Artjoms Osipovs	Jonava	(Latvia) Jelgava	Free	
1 February 2019	(Lithuania) Deividas Lukošius	Atlantas	Banga	Free	
1 February 2019	(Brazil) Marcos Júnior	Stumbras	(Portugal) Oliveirense	Undisclosed	
4 February 2019	(Chile) Gerson Acevedo	Sūduva	Free Market	Released	

== Trials ==
Only following cases apply to this category:

- Player was on trial in A Lyga club, but haven't joined any club of the league;
- Player from the league was away in any other club for a trial, but wasn't sold, loaned out or released to another club in this transfer window.

Date	Name	Moving from	Moving to	Type	Source
14 December 2018	(Croatia) Ante Bakmaz	(Latvia) Valmiera Glass ViA	Panevėžys	Trial	
19 December 2018	(Lithuania) Titas Aukštuolis	NFA	Panevėžys	Trial	
8 January 2019	(Lithuania) Matas Radžiukynas	Banga	Trakai	Trial	
9 January 2019	(Lithuania) Renatas Banevičius	DFK Dainava	Sūduva	Trial	
10 January 2019	(Lithuania) Martynas Medelinskas	(Belgium) Antwerp	Žalgiris	Trial	
10 January 2019	(Lithuania) Džiugas Raudonius	NFA	Žalgiris	Trial	
17 January 2019	(Lithuania) Robertas Ratkevičius	NFA	Žalgiris	Trial	
17 January 2019	(Russia) Timur Pukhov	(Russia) CSKA Moscow	Žalgiris	Trial	
18 January 2019	(France) Yvan Erichot	(Iceland) Íþróttabandalag Vestmannaeyja	Sūduva	Trial	
18 January 2019	(Brazil) Luís Fernando	(Switzerland) Bulle	Sūduva	Trial	
19 January 2019	(Lithuania) Valdas Paulauskas	NFA	Trakai	Trial	
19 January 2019	(Lithuania) Matas Ramanauskas	NFA	Trakai	Trial	
19 January 2019	(Lithuania) Lukas Jakavičius	NFA	Trakai	Trial	
19 January 2019	(Greece) Joseph Zawko	(Italy) Gladiator	Panevėžys	Trial	
19 January 2019	(Lithuania) Rokas Gedeikis	Širvėna	Panevėžys	Trial	
19 January 2019	(Switzerland) Célien Wicht	(Switzerland) Rapperswil-Jona	Panevėžys	Trial	
23 January 2019	(Belarus) Mikhail Kolyadko	Kauno Žalgiris	(Belarus) Slavia Mozyr	Trial	
23 January 2019	(Poland) Szymon Sobczak	(Poland) Stal Mielec	Kauno Žalgiris	Trial	
25 January 2019	Rudinilson Silva	(Morocco) Olympique de Khouribga	Kauno Žalgiris	Trial	
28 January 2019	Yuriy Bushman	(Ukraine) Arsenal Kyiv	Kauno Žalgiris	Trial	
30 January 2019	(Lithuania) Martynas Medelinskas	(Belgium) Antwerp	Sūduva	Trial	
30 January 2019	(Greece) Christos Intzidis	(Australia) South Melbourne	Palanga	Trial	
2 February 2019	(Poland) Mateusz Cetnarski	(Poland) KS Cracovia	Sūduva	Trial	
2 February 2019	(Finland) Tero Mäntylä	(Finland) Inter Turku	Sūduva	Trial	
2 February 2019	(Lithuania) Dominykas Kodz	Žalgiris	Trakai	Trial	
2 February 2019	(Lithuania) Gintaras Grigalevičius	Free Market	Trakai	Trial	
2 February 2019	(Nigeria) Terem Moffi	Free Market	Trakai	Trial	

== Staff ==
Date	Name	Position	Moving from	Moving to	Source
16 November 2018	(Lithuania) Deividas Česnauskis	Director of football	Free Market	Žalgiris	
28 November 2018	(Lithuania) Deividas Šemberas	Managing director	Free Market	Žalgiris	
10 December 2018	(Lithuania) Rolandas Džiaukštas	Assistant manager	Žalgiris	Free Market	
21 December 2018	(Lithuania) Aurelijus Skarbalius	Manager	Free Market	Trakai	
2 January 2019	(Lithuania) Valdas Trakys	Manager	Palanga	Minija	
8 January 2018	(Lithuania) Vaidas Sabaliauskas	Assistant manager	Žalgiris	Trakai	
28 January 2018	(Lithuania) Džeraldas Rocys	Director of football	Free Market	Jonava	
28 January 2018	(Lithuania) Vaidas Vaškevičius	Director	Free Market	Jonava	
29 January 2019	(Russia) Artyom Gorlov	Manager	(Russia) FSC Dolgoprudny	Palanga	
29 January 2019	(Russia) Aleksandr Ushakhin	Assistant manager	(Russia) SKA-Khabarovsk	Palanga	
31 January 2019	(Portugal) Mariano Barreto	Manager	Stumbras	Free Market	
2 February 2018	(Lithuania) Valdas Urbonas	Manager	Žalgiris	Lithuania national football team	
2 February 2019	(Lithuania) Vacys Lekevičius	Chairman	Atlantas	Free Market	
2 February 2019	(Lithuania) Vidas Adomaitis	Chairman	Free Market	Atlantas	
