= 2019 A Lyga =

30th edition of the Lithuanian football championship

A Lyga
- Season: 2019
- Champions: Sūduva
- Relegated: Atlantas; Palanga; Stumbras
- Champions League: Sūduva
- Europa League: Žalgiris; Riteriai; Kauno Žalgiris
- Matches: 127
- Goals: 405 (3.19 per match)
- Top goalscorer: Tomislav Kiš (27 goals)
- Biggest home win: Sūduva 9–1 Atlantas (30 October 2019)
- Biggest away win: Atlantas 0–5 Sūduva (10 March 2019); Panevėžys 2–7 Sūduva (24 September 2019)
- Highest scoring: Sūduva 9–1 Atlantas (30 October 2019)
- Longest winning run: 16 games Sūduva
- Longest unbeaten run: 16 games Sūduva
- Longest winless run: 22 games Stumbras
- Longest losing run: 18 games Stumbras
- Highest attendance: 2,500; Žalgiris v Sūduva (20 October 2019)
- Lowest attendance: 50; Palanga v Sūduva (20 April 2019)
- Total attendance: 52,357
- Average attendance: 468
- All statistics correct as of 1 December.

The 2019 A Lyga was the 30th season of the A Lyga, the top-tier association football league of Lithuania. The season began on 2 March 2019 and ended on 27 November 2019.

Sūduva Marijampolė began the season as defending champions having won their second consecutive league title last year. They secured a third consecutive title in Aukštaitija Stadium on 3 November, after they beat Panevėžys 5–1.

Only five league clubs survived throughout the year – Stumbras folded in the summer, while Atlantas and Palanga were disqualified in the off-season.

== Teams ==
Eight clubs competed – the top six of the 2018 season, the winner of the relegation play-offs and the champions of the 2018 LFF I Lyga. Palanga remained in the league having won the play-offs, while Panevėžys made their top-tier debut replacing relegated Jonava.

Trakai changed their name to Riteriai during the preseason, for a better identification with Vilnius, where the main team has been located since 2014.

=== Stumbras bankruptcy ===
In 2019 Stumbras started the season very well by winning against FK Sūduva Marijampolė and FK Žalgiris Vilnius, claiming the top position of the 2019 A Lyga table. However, after the first half of the season the club ran into financial problems. The players and staff started leaving the team. The club was stripped of the place in 2019–20 UEFA Europa League and it's A Lyga license revoked. The club became defunct shortly afterwards.

=== Match fixing scandal ===
On 5 December 2019, the Lithuanian Football Federation announce that two A Lyga clubs, FK Atlantas Klaipėda and FK Palanga have been excluded from the A Lyga due to manipulation of the match results, fined 42,000 euros and relegated to the II Lyga. Ten players and one staff were punished with fines and a ban from all football activity ranging from 6 to 12 months.

=== Clubs and locations ===
Locations of the 2019 A Lyga teams
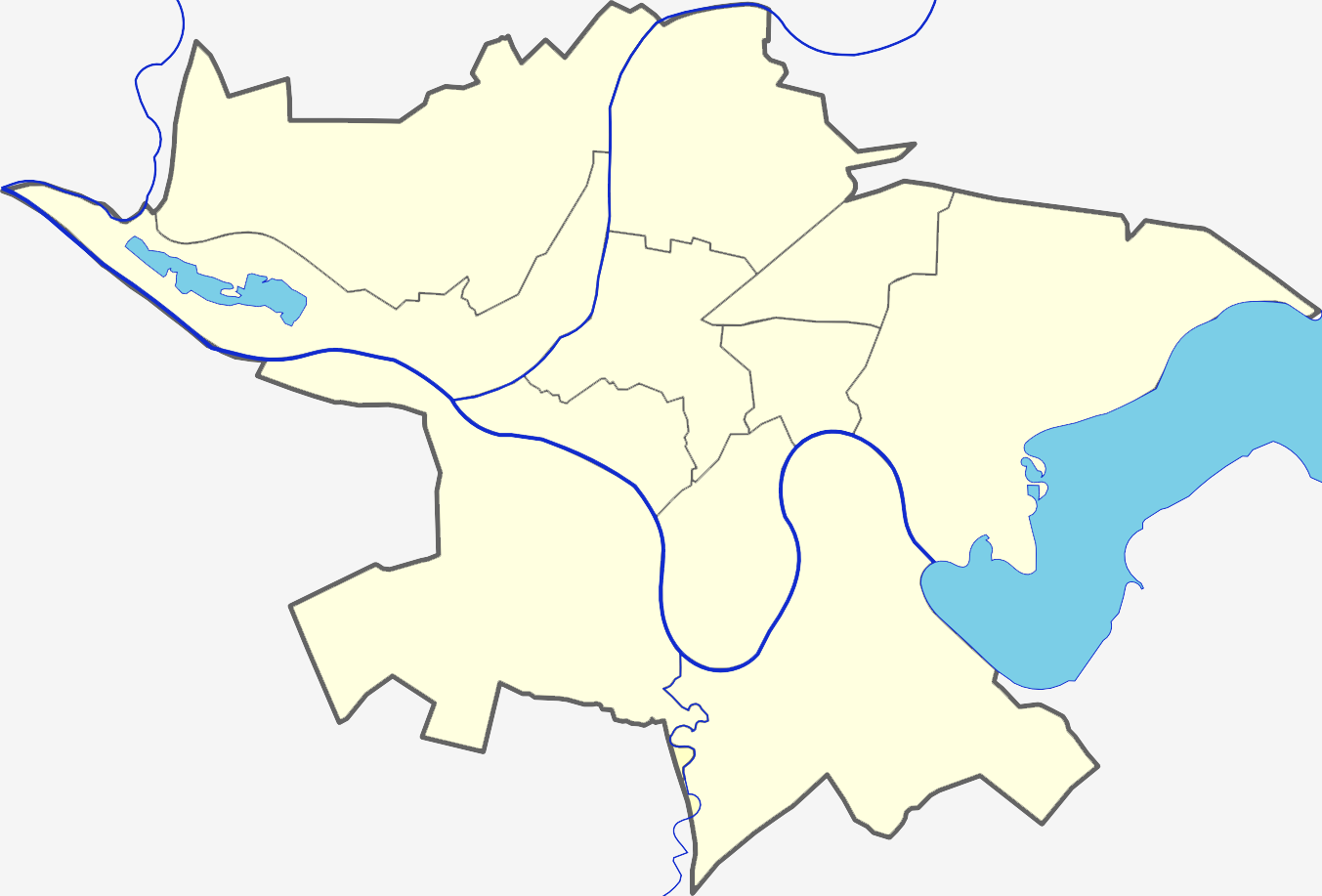
Kaunas teams

The following teams competed in the 2019 championship:

Club	Location	Stadium	Turf	Capacity	2018 position
Atlantas	Klaipėda	Central Stadium of Klaipėda	Natural	4,428	6th
Atlantas	Klaipėda	Klaipėda Artificial Football Pitch	Artificial	1,000	6th
Kauno Žalgiris	Kaunas	SM Tauras Stadium	Natural	500	5th
Kauno Žalgiris	Kaunas	NFA Stadium	Artificial	500	5th
Palanga	Palanga	Palanga Stadium	Natural	1,212	7th
Palanga	Klaipėda^{SL}	Klaipėda Artificial Football Pitch	Artificial	1,000	7th
Panevėžys	Panevėžys	Aukštaitija Stadium	Natural	6,600	I Lyga, 1st
Panevėžys	Panevėžys	Žemyna Progymnasium Stadium	Artificial	500	I Lyga, 1st
Riteriai	Vilnius	LFF Stadium	Artificial	5,067	3rd
Riteriai	Vilnius	Sportima Arena	Artificial	3,157	3rd
Stumbras	Kaunas	NFA Stadium	Artificial	500	4th
Sūduva	Marijampolė	ARVI Football Arena	Natural	6,250	1st
Sūduva	Marijampolė	ARVI Football Indoor Arena	Artificial	2,660	1st
Žalgiris	Vilnius	LFF Stadium	Artificial	5,067	2nd
Žalgiris	Vilnius	Sportima Arena	Artificial	3,157	2nd

Stadium location

=== Personnel and kits ===
Note: Flags indicate national team as has been defined under FIFA eligibility rules. Players and Managers may hold more than one non-FIFA nationality.

Team	Head coach	Captain	Kit manufacturer	Shirt sponsor
Atlantas	(Latvia) Viktors Dobrecovs	(Lithuania) Darvydas Šernas	Nike	—
Kauno Žalgiris	(Lithuania) Mindaugas Čepas	(Lithuania) Linas Pilibaitis	Hummel	BC Žalgiris
Palanga	(Russia) Artyom Gorlov	(Lithuania) Gvidas Juška	Nike	011
Panevėžys	(Moldova) Alexandru Curteian	(Lithuania) Paulius Janušauskas	Hummel	Kalnapilis
Riteriai	(Lithuania) Aurelijus Skarbalius	(Lithuania) Valdemaras Borovskis	Nike	Ecoil
Stumbras	(Portugal) João Luís Martins	(Lithuania) Rimvydas Sadauskas	Joma	—
Sūduva	(Kazakhstan) Vladimir Cheburin	(Lithuania) Algis Jankauskas	Joma	Sumeda
Žalgiris	(Portugal) João Luís Martins	(Lithuania) Saulius Mikoliūnas	Nike	Top Sport

=== Managerial changes ===
Team	Outgoing manager	Manner of departure	Date of vacancy	Position in table	Incoming manager	Date of appointment
Atlantas	(Lithuania) Vacys Lekevičius	End of caretaker spell	11 November 2018	Pre-season	(Latvia) Viktors Dobrecovs	16 February 2019
Riteriai	(Belarus) Albert Rybak	End of caretaker spell	21 December 2018	Pre-season	(Lithuania) Aurelijus Skarbalius	21 December 2018
Palanga	(Lithuania) Valdas Trakys	Mutual consent	2 January 2019	Pre-season	(Russia) Artyom Gorlov	29 January 2019
Stumbras	(Portugal) Mariano Barreto	Mutual consent	31 January 2019	Pre-season	(Portugal) João Luís Martins	22 February 2019
Žalgiris	(Lithuania) Valdas Urbonas	Signed by Lithuania national team	2 February 2019	Pre-season	(Poland) Marek Zub	13 February 2019

== Regular season ==
=== Table ===
Pos	Team	Pld	W	D	L	GF	GA	GD	Pts	Qualification or relegation
1	Sūduva	28	25	0	3	74	15	+59	75	Qualification to Championship round
2	Žalgiris	28	21	2	5	67	22	+45	65	Qualification to Championship round
3	Riteriai	28	13	7	8	44	29	+15	46	Qualification to Championship round
4	Kauno Žalgiris	28	13	5	10	48	39	+9	44	Qualification to Championship round
5	Panevėžys	28	8	7	13	41	53	−12	31	Qualification to Championship round
6	Atlantas	28	7	5	16	26	53	−27	26	Qualification to Championship round
7	Palanga (D, R)	28	6	1	21	29	70	−41	19	Qualification to Relegation play-offs and disqualified after the season
8	Stumbras (D, R)	28	4	3	21	12	60	−48	15	Withdrew mid-season in 30 July 2019

Source: A Lyga (in Lithuanian), UEFA, Soccerway
Rules for classification: 1) Points; 2) Head-to-head points; 3) Head-to-head goal difference; 4) Head-to-head goals scored; 5) Head-to-head matches won; 6) Goal difference; 7) Goals scored; 8) Matches won.
(D) Disqualified; (R) Relegated

=== Results ===
==== First half of season ====
Home \ Away	ATL	KŽA	PAL	PAN	RIT	STU	SŪD	ŽAL
Atlantas	—	2–0	2–1	2–1	2–3	0–0	0–5	0–3
Kauno Žalgiris	2–1	—	6–1	2–0	3–1	4–3	0–3	3–4
Palanga	2–1	0–3	—	1–1	1–3	2–1	0–2	1–4
Panevėžys	4–1	1–1	2–1	—	1–2	1–1	1–2	0–3
Riteriai	0–0	1–0	3–1	1–1	—	0–0	1–2	1–0
Stumbras	2–0	0–1	0–3	1–0	0–3	—	2–0	1–0
Sūduva	4–0	1–0	3–0	2–1	2–1	2–0	—	1–0
Žalgiris	3–0	3–1	5–1	2–1	1–1	2–1	1–0	—

Source: A Lyga (in Lithuanian)
Legend: Blue = home team win; Yellow = draw; Red = away team win.

==== Second half of season ====
Home \ Away	ATL	KŽA	PAL	PAN	RIT	STU	SŪD	ŽAL
Atlantas	—	1–1	0–1	0–2	2–1	3–0	0–4	1–3
Kauno Žalgiris	1–0	—	4–0	2–2	1–0	3–0	0–2	1–2
Palanga	0–2	2–3	—	1–2	1–3	3–0	0–4	0–4
Panevėžys	1–1	3–3	3–1	—	4–2	3–0	2–7	0–2
Riteriai	1–1	0–0	1–0	4–0	—	3–0	1–2	1–1
Stumbras	0–3	0–3	0–3	0–3	0–3	—	0–3	0–3
Sūduva	4–1	3–0	6–0	3–1	1–2	3–0	—	1–0
Žalgiris	4–0	3–0	3–2	5–0	2–1	3–0	1–3	—

Source: A Lyga (in Lithuanian)
Legend: Blue = home team win; Yellow = draw; Red = away team win.

== Championship round ==
=== Table ===
Pos	Team	Pld	W	D	L	GF	GA	GD	Pts	Qualification
1	Sūduva (C)	33	29	0	4	95	24	+71	87	Qualification to Champions League first qualifying round
2	Žalgiris	33	24	2	7	79	29	+50	74	Qualification to Europa League first qualifying round
3	Riteriai	33	16	7	10	57	36	+21	55	Qualification to Europa League first qualifying round
4	Kauno Žalgiris	33	16	5	12	54	45	+9	53	Qualification to Europa League first qualifying round
5	Panevėžys	33	10	7	16	49	63	−14	37	
6	Atlantas (D, R)	33	7	5	21	30	78	−48	26	Relegation to 2020 II Lyga

Source: soccerway.com
(C) Champions; (D) Disqualified; (R) Relegated

=== Results ===
Home \ Away	ATL	KŽA	PAN	RIT	SUD	ZAL
Atlantas	—	0–2	1–4			
Kauno Žalgiris		—	1–0			1–2
Panevėžys			—	2–0	1–5	
Riteriai	5–2	0–1		—	5–1	
Sūduva	9–1	4–1			—	2–1
Žalgiris	5–0		3–1	1–3		—

Source: A Lyga (in Lithuanian)
Legend: Blue = home team win; Yellow = draw; Red = away team win.

== Relegation play-offs ==
The 7th placed team will face the runners-up of the 2019 LFF I Lyga for a two-legged play-off. The winner on aggregate score after both matches will earn entry into the 2020 A Lyga.

=== First leg ===
3 November 2019
13:00 EEST

Banga	2–0	Palanga
Renato Matos da Silva 14'; Algimantas Bačanskis 57'	Report

Gargždų stadionas, Gargždai
Attendance: 300
Referee: Gediminas Mažeika

=== Second leg ===
9 November 2019
13:00 EEST

Palanga	2–2	Banga
Sergei Mošnikov 66'; Josip Jurjević 75'	Report	45' Jonas Bičkus; 90+3' Jonas Bičkus

Klaipėdos DDA, Klaipėda
Attendance: 200
Referee: Manfredas Lukjančukas

== Positions by round ==
The table lists the positions of teams after each week of matches. In order to preserve chronological progress, any postponed matches are not included in the round at which they were originally scheduled, but added to the full round they were played immediately afterwards. For example, if a match is scheduled for matchday 13, but then postponed and played between days 16 and 17, it will be added to the standings for day 16.

Leader – Qualification to Champions League first qualifying round
Qualification to Europa League first qualifying round
Qualification to relegation play-offs
Relegation to 2020 I Lyga

Team \ Round	1	2	3	4	5	6	7	8	9	10	11	12	13	14	15	16	17	18	19	20	21	22	23	24	25	26	27	28	29	30	31	32	33
Sūduva	3	2	1	3	3	3	2	2	2	1	1	1	1	1	1	1	1	1	2	2	2	2	2	2	1	1	1	1	1	1	1	1	1
Žalgiris	1	1	2	1	1	2	1	1	1	2	2	2	2	2	2	2	2	2	1	1	1	1	1	1	2	2	2	2	2	2	2	2	2
Riteriai	5	6	6	5	5	5	5	5	5	4	4	4	4	3	3	3	3	3	3	3	3	4	4	4	3	3	3	3	4	3	3	3	3
Kauno Žalgiris	7	5	5	4	4	4	4	3	3	3	3	3	3	4	4	4	4	4	4	4	4	3	3	3	4	4	4	4	3	4	4	4	4
Panevėžys	6	7	7	7	8	8	8	8	8	8	8	7	7	7	6	6	5	5	5	5	5	5	5	5	5	5	5	5	5	5	5	5	5
Atlantas	2	4	4	6	7	6	7	7	7	6	6	6	6	6	7	7	6	6	6	6	6	6	6	6	6	6	6	6	6	6	6	6	6
Palanga	8	8	8	8	6	7	6	6	6	7	7	8	8	8	8	8	8	8	8	8	8	8	8	8	8	7	7	7					
Stumbras	4	3	3	2	2	1	3	4	4	5	5	5	5	5	5	5	7	7	7	7	7	7	7	7	7	8	8	8					

Updated to games played on 9 November 2019

== Season statistics ==
=== Top scorers ===
Rank	Pos.	Player	Club	Goals	MP	APG
1	FW	(Croatia) Tomislav Kiš	Žalgiris	27	2712	100
2	FW	(Austria) (Bosnia and Herzegovina) Mihret Topčagić	Sūduva	20	1482	74
2	FW	(Nigeria) Terem Moffi	Riteriai	20	2590	129
4	MF	(Romania) Liviu Antal	Žalgiris	15	2135	142
5	MF	(Lithuania) Donatas Kazlauskas	Riteriai	12	2450	204
6	FW	(Brazil) João Figueiredo	Kauno Žalgiris	10	1484	149
6	FW	(Croatia) Josip Tadić	Sūduva	10	1224	122
8	FW	(Lithuania) Eligijus Jankauskas	Sūduva	9	1134	126
9	FW	(Canada) Tosaint Ricketts	Sūduva	8	913	115
9	MF	(Lithuania) Paulius Golubickas	Sūduva	8	2054	257

Updated at the end of the season

=== Hat-tricks ===
Player	For	Against	Result	Date	Ref
(Brazil) João Figueiredo	Kauno Žalgiris	Palanga	6–1 (H)	9 March 2019	
(Lithuania) Edvinas Kloniūnas	Kauno Žalgiris	Riteriai	3–1 (H)	13 April 2019	
(Austria) Mihret Topčagić	Sūduva	Kauno Žalgiris	3–0 (H)	3 July 2019	
(Croatia) Tomislav Kiš	Žalgiris	Palanga	4–0 (A)	31 August 2019	
(Nigeria) Terem Moffi	Riteriai	Palanga	3–1 (A)	25 September 2019	
(Austria) Mihret Topčagić^{5}	Sūduva	Atlantas	9–1 (H)	30 October 2019	

Notes

^{5} Player scored 5 goals

== Attendance ==
Pos	Team	Total	High	Low	Average	Change
1	Sūduva	16,325	2,100	500	1,089	+10.6%
2	Žalgiris	10,115	2,500	165	675	+8.9%
3	Panevėžys	8,800	1,100	250	629	+19.6%^{1}
4	Stumbras	1,857	500	100	310	+63.2%
5	Kauno Žalgiris	4,095	500	150	293	+63.7%
6	Atlantas	3,845	500	75	275	+6.6%
7	Riteriai	3,720	400	70	248	−20.0%
8	Palanga	2,415	400	50	186	−12.7%
	League total	51,172	2,500	50	483	+21.1%

Updated to games played on 9 November 2019
Source: A Lyga, Lietuvos Futbolas
Notes:
1: Team played last season in the I Lyga

== Awards ==
=== Monthly awards ===
==== Individual ====
Player of the Month
Month	Player	Stats	Rf
March	Tomislav Kiš (Žalgiris)	4GP, 5G, 1A	
April	Pau Morer (Žalgiris)	4GP, 3G, 1A	
May	Ivan Kardum (Sūduva)	4GP, 4CS, 0GA	
June & July	Mihret Topčagić (Sūduva)	5GP, 6G, 1A	
August	Tomislav Kiš (Žalgiris)	3GP, 5G, 3A	
September	Tomislav Kiš (Žalgiris)	3GP, 5G, 2A	
October	Mihret Topčagić (Sūduva)	7GP, 8G, 2A	
November	Terem Moffi (Riteriai)	4GP, 6G, 3A	

Young Player of the Month
Month	Player	Stats	Rf
March	Paulius Golubickas (Sūduva)	4GP, 2G, 2A	
April	Idris Umayev (Palanga)	5GP, 3G, 1A	
May	Paulius Golubickas (Sūduva)	4GP, 1G, 2A	
June & July	Terem Moffi (Riteriai)	4GP, 3G	
August	Karolis Uzėla (Žalgiris)	3GP, 3G, 1A	
September	Paulius Golubickas (Sūduva)	3GP, 2G, 1A	
October	Eligijus Jankauskas (Sūduva)	4GP, 3G, 1A	
November	Terem Moffi (Riteriai)	4GP, 6G, 3A	

Coach of the Month
Month	Manager	Win %	Rf
March	João Luís Martins (Stumbras)	4GP, 75%	
April	Mindaugas Čepas (Kauno Žalgiris)	4GP, 75%	
May	Vladimir Cheburin (Sūduva)	4GP, 100%	
June & July	Marek Zub (Žalgiris)	4GP, 100%	
August	Alexandru Curteian (Panevėžys)	5GP, 80%	
September	Vladimir Cheburin (Sūduva)	4GP, 100%	
October	Vladimir Cheburin (Sūduva)	7GP, 100%	
November	Albert Rybak (Riteriai)	4GP, 75%	

==== Team of the Month ====
Team of the Month
Month	Goalkeeper	Defenders	Midfielders	Forwards
March	(Brazil) Josviaki (Stumbras)	(Mexico) Alonso (Stumbras) (Serbia) Živanović (Sūduva) (Lithuania) Sadauskas (Stumbras) (Lithuania) Baravykas (Žalgiris)	(Spain) Morer (Žalgiris) (Lithuania) Golubickas (Sūduva) (Spain) Pérez (Žalgiris) (Georgia (country)) Macharashvili (Stumbras)	(Russia) Umayev (Palanga) (Croatia) Kiš (Žalgiris)
April	(Lithuania) Vitkauskas (Žalgiris)	(Ukraine) Bushman (Kauno Žalgiris) (Serbia) Živanović (Sūduva) (Lithuania) Mikuckis (Kauno Žalgiris) (Lithuania) Šešplaukis (Kauno Žalgiris)	(Spain) Morer (Žalgiris) (Lithuania) Vorobjovas (Žalgiris) (Croatia) Kiš (Žalgiris) (Russia) Umayev (Palanga)	(Brazil) Figueiredo (Kauno Žalgiris) (Lithuania) Jankauskas (Sūduva)
May	(Croatia) Kardum (Sūduva)	(Ukraine) Bushman (Kauno Žalgiris) (Belarus) Kruk (Panevėžys) (Bosnia and Herzegovina) Kerla (Sūduva) (Lithuania) Borovskis (Riteriai)	(Lithuania) Kazlauskas (Riteriai) (Lithuania) Jeriomenka (Riteriai) (Lithuania) Golubickas (Sūduva) (Croatia) Švrljuga (Sūduva)	(Nigeria) Moffi (Riteriai) (Croatia) Kiš (Žalgiris)
June & July	(Lithuania) Švedkauskas (Riteriai)	(Netherlands) Slijngard (Žalgiris) (Bosnia and Herzegovina) Kerla (Sūduva) (Croatia) Švrljuga (Sūduva)	(Lithuania) Kazlauskas (Riteriai) (Montenegro) Čađenović (Sūduva) (Lithuania) Vorobjovas (Žalgiris) (Romania) Antal (Žalgiris)	(Brazil) Ledesma (Panevėžys) (Austria) Topčagić (Sūduva) (Nigeria) Moffi (Riteriai)
August	(Brazil) Broetto (Panevėžys)	(Ukraine) Bushman (Kauno Žalgiris) (Slovenia) Bolha (Žalgiris) (Lithuania) Gašpuitis (Panevėžys) (Lithuania) Uzėla (Žalgiris)	(Lithuania) Šernas (Atlantas) (Montenegro) Eliošius (Panevėžys) (Croatia) Kiš (Žalgiris) (Lithuania) Romanovskij (Kauno Žalgiris) (Colombia) Vásquez (Panevėžys)	(Romania) Antal (Žalgiris)
September & October	(Croatia) Kardum (Sūduva)	(Ukraine) Bushman (Kauno Žalgiris) (Serbia) Živanović (Sūduva) (Bosnia and Herzegovina) Kerla (Sūduva) (Croatia) Švrljuga (Sūduva)	(Lithuania) Kazlauskas (Riteriai) (Lithuania) Pilibaitis (Kauno Žalgiris) (Lithuania) Golubickas (Sūduva) (Lithuania) Jankauskas (Sūduva)	(Austria) Topčagić (Sūduva) (Croatia) Kiš (Žalgiris)
November	(Croatia) Kardum (Sūduva)	(Serbia) Živanović (Sūduva) (Lithuania) Januševskij (Riteriai) (Guinea-Bissau) Rudinilson (Kauno Žalgiris)	(Lithuania) Kazlauskas (Riteriai) (Lithuania) Janušauskas (Panevėžys) (Brazil) Oliveira (Sūduva) (Lithuania) Grigaravičius (Riteriai)	(Brazil) Bordon (Panevėžys) (Croatia) Tadić (Sūduva) (Nigeria) Moffi (Riteriai)

Multiple appearances
Player	Club	App
(Croatia) Tomislav Kiš	Žalgiris	5
(Ukraine) Yuriy Bushman	Kauno Žalgiris	4
(Serbia) Aleksandar Živanović	Sūduva	4
(Lithuania) Donatas Kazlauskas	Riteriai	4
(Lithuania) Paulius Golubickas	Sūduva	3
(Bosnia and Herzegovina) Semir Kerla	Sūduva	3
(Croatia) Andro Švrljuga	Sūduva	3
(Croatia) Ivan Kardum	Sūduva	3
(Nigeria) Terem Moffi	Riteriai	3
(Spain) Pau Morer	Žalgiris	2
(Russia) Idris Umayev	Palanga	2
(Lithuania) Modestas Vorobjovas	Žalgiris	2
(Romania) Liviu Antal	Žalgiris	2
(Lithuania) Eligijus Jankauskas	Sūduva	2
(Austria) Mihret Topčagić	Sūduva	2
