= Hans-Joachim Schellberg =

German footballer

Personal information
- Full name: Hans-Joachim Schellberg
- Date of birth: 2 October 1947 (age 79)
- Place of birth: Duisburg, Germany
- Height: 1.73 m (5 ft 8 in)
- Position: Midfielder

Youth career
- TuS Duisburg 48/99
- Eintracht Duisburg

Senior career*
Years	Team	Apps	(Gls)
1964–1967	Eintracht Duisburg		
1967–1969	MSV Duisburg		
1969–1971	DJK Gütersloh	41	(8)
1971–1973	TuS Neuendorf	49	(7)
1973–1975	1. FC Saarbrücken	33	(4)
1977	Deportes Concepción	26	(4)
1978	Universidad de Chile	19	(1)
1979–1980	VfB Gaggenau		
- * Club domestic league appearances and goals

Hans-Joachim Schellberg (born 2 October 1947) is a former West German footballer who played as a midfielder.

== Career ==
A midfielder, Schellberg played in his homeland for Eintracht Duisburg, MSV Duisburg, DJK Gütersloh, TuS Neuendorf and 1. FC Saarbrücken in the 1960s and the first half of the 1970s.

In 1977, Schellberg and his countrymen Hans-Werner Lamour and Ralf Berger moved to Chile to play for Deportes Concepción in the top division under Nelson Oyarzún, who had met them in the early 1970s when he got a football manager grade in Homburg. He made 25 appearances and scored two goals for them.

In 1978, Schellberg switched to Chilean giant Universidad de Chile, making 19 appearances with a goal.

Back to his homeland, Schellberg ended his career with VfB Gaggenau in 1979–80.
