= Hans-Werner Lamour =

German footballer

Personal information
- Full name: Hans-Werner Lamour
- Date of birth: 28 September 1951 (age 75)
- Place of birth: West Germany
- Position: Forward

Senior career*
Years	Team	Apps	(Gls)
1970–1972	SV Alsenborn	40	(5)
1972–1974	1. FC Saarbrücken	27	(4)
1974–1975	ASC Dudweiler		
1977	Deportes Concepción	25	(2)
1978–1979	Borussia Neunkirchen	12	(1)
- * Club domestic league appearances and goals

Hans-Werner Lamour (born 28 September 1951) is a German former footballer who played as a forward.

== Career ==
A forward, Lamour played in his homeland for SV Alsenborn, 1. FC Saarbrücken and ASC Dudweiler in the first half of the 1970s.

In 1977, Lamour and his countrymen Hans-Joachim Schellberg and Ralf Berger moved to Chile to play for Deportes Concepción in the top division under Nelson Oyarzún, who had met them in the early 1970's when he got a football manager grade in Homburg. He made 25 appearances and scored two goals for them.

Following Deportes Concepción, Lamour returned to West Germany to play for Borussia Neunkirchen in the 1978–79 2. Bundesliga.
