= Nelson Oyarzún =

Chilean football manager (1943–1978)

Personal information
- Full name: Nelson Oyarzún Arenas
- Date of birth: 21 March 1943
- Place of birth: Valparaíso, Chile
- Date of death: 10 September 1978 (aged 35)
- Place of death: Chillán, Chile

Managerial career
- Years: Team
- 1975: Lota Schwager
- 1977: Deportes Concepción
- 1978: Universidad de Chile
- 1978: Ñublense

Nelson Oyarzún Arenas (21 March 1943 – 10 September 1978), known as Consomé (Consomme), was a Chilean football manager.

== Club career ==
Oyarzún was born in Valparaíso in 1942, moving years later to the capital Santiago. He attended Liceo José Victorino Lastarria when he was teenager.

In the early 1970s, he went to Germany to study a football manager grade, finishing it in 1972 at Hamburg. Three years later, Oyarzún joined Lota Schwager, leaving the team amid the tournament. Two seasons later he moved to Deportes Concepción, where despite his short spell was remembered for the incredible performance that the club reached under him as coach alongside the German players Hans-Joachim Schellberg, Hans-Werner Lamour and Ralf Berger. These facts, added his strategy acquired during his years of study at Europe, revolutionized Chilean football.

In 1978, Oyarzún was hired by Chilean giants Universidad de Chile where he re-united with Schellberg, but following bad results he was fired. Months later he joined Ñublense, a first-tier team from Chillán.

== Death ==
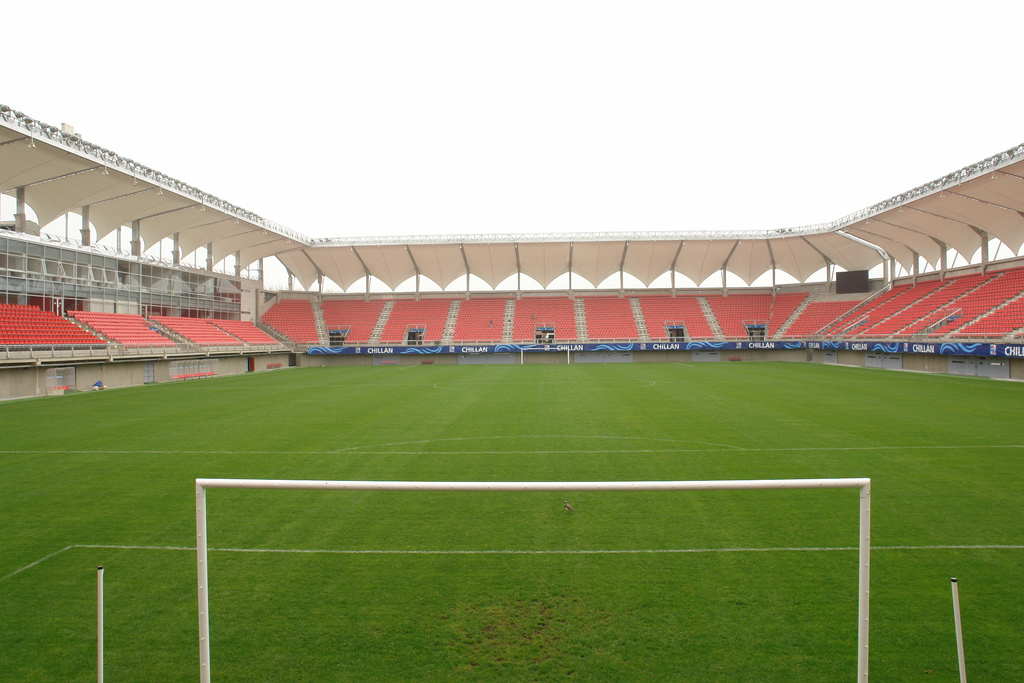
The Municipal Stadium of Chillán wears his name as tribute since 1978.

Once in Chillán, aged 35 during 1978 as manager of Ñublense, he progressively saw their cancer worsen and died on 10 September.

Hours prior his death at the Herminda Martin Hospital alongside his spouse, his sons and his brother Gastón, he asked the latter to leave him his message to the captain of Carabineros, Fernando Chesta, that he would communicate the team players at the city's Isabel Riquelme Hotel the following:

Tell the team, that if something happens to me tomorrow, that fight with the same heart and desire they had in every game. Tell to Pancho Cuevas that do all the crazy things he knows at the field, that Bonhome play as a tank, that Cerenderos continue being the impassable wall on defense and Aballay run with his seven lungs (...)

The message could not be completely transmitted due to the excitement of the players and the same captain of Carabineros. In the afternoon of that same day, Ñublense played against Colo-Colo and won 2–1 in a memorable match. Once finished the game the players knew that Oyarzún had died; his remains rest in the Municipal Cemetery of Chillán.

== Personal life ==
He is the father of Marcelo Oyarzún, a fitness coach and former player for Santiago Morning who was a member of the technical staff of Colo-Colo at the 1991 Copa Libertadores, among others football teams, and the grandfather of Diego Oyarzún, a professional football player.

== Curiosities ==
He was commonly known as Consomé (Consomme) due to he used to serve a portion of broth to his players.
