= Aleksandar Živanović (footballer, born 1987) =

Serbian footballer

Personal information
- Date of birth: 8 April 1987 (age 39)
- Place of birth: Niš, SR Serbia, Yugoslavia
- Height: 1.90 m (6 ft 3 in)
- Position: Centre-back

Team information
- Current team: Sūduva
- Number: 15

Youth career
- Železničar Niš

Senior career*
Years	Team	Apps	(Gls)
2005–2008	Sinđelić Niš		
2009	Radnički Niš		
2009–2010	Čukarički	31	(0)
2011	Hajduk Kula	12	(0)
2011–2015	Jagodina	76	(6)
2015–2016	Mladost Lučani	36	(0)
2017–	Sūduva	262	(17)
- * Club domestic league appearances and goals as of 10 November 2025

Aleksandar Živanović (Serbian Cyrillic: Александар Живановић; born 8 April 1987) is a Serbian professional footballer who plays as a centre-back for Lithuanian club Sūduva.

== Career ==
Matured in Železničar and Sinđelić in his birth town, Živanović played several years for Sinđelić Niš. After short stint with Radnički Niš he moved to, then Serbian SuperLiga club Čukarički. After half season spent in Hajduk Kula, he has finally settled in Jagodina.

On 17 February 2017 Živanović joined Lithuanian club Sūduva.

== Honours ==
Jagodina

- Serbian Cup: 2013

Sūduva

- A Lyga: 2017, 2018, 2019
- Lithuanian Football Cup: 2019
- Lithuanian Supercup: 2018, 2019
