= Klimas Gusočenko =

Lithuanian footballer

Personal information
- Full name: Klimas Gusočenko
- Date of birth: 9 March 1989 (age 37)
- Place of birth: Šiauliai, Lithuania
- Height: 1.89 m (6 ft 2 in)
- Position: Defender

Youth career
- Šiauliai

Senior career*
Years	Team	Apps	(Gls)
2009–2013	Šiauliai	57	(1)
2014	Flota Świnoujście	7	(0)
2015	Kauno Žalgiris	17	(0)
2015–2017	Wisła Puławy	20	(2)
2017	Kauno Žalgiris	16	(2)
2018	Vilniaus Vytis	10	(0)
2019	Atlantas Klaipėda	9	(0)
2020	Palanga	5	(0)
2020	Ekenäs	12	(0)
- * Club domestic league appearances and goals as of 9 March 2024

Klimas Gusočenko (born 9 March 1989) is a Lithuanian professional footballer who plays as a defender.
