= Aleksandr Ushakhin =

Russian footballer and coach

Personal information
- Full name: Aleksandr Vladislavovich Ushakhin
- Date of birth: 26 September 1964 (age 62)
- Place of birth: Blagoveshchensk, Russian SFSR
- Height: 1.78 m (5 ft 10 in)
- Position: Defender

Team information
- Current team: FC SKA-Khabarovsk (assistant coach)

Youth career
- FC Spartak Blagoveshchensk

Senior career*
| Years | Team | Apps | (Gls) |
| 1987 | FC Spartak Blagoveshchensk | | |
| 1987–1989 | FC Amur Blagoveshchensk | 37 | (0) |
| 1992 | FC Stroitel Shimanovsk | | |
| 1992 | FC Amurinvest Svobodny | | |
| 1993–1997 | FC Amur Blagoveshchensk | 129 | (3) |
| 2000 | FC Kristall Blagoveshchensk | | |

Managerial career
- 2011: FC Luch-Energiya Vladivostok (assistant)
- 2011–2013: FC SKA-Energiya Khabarovsk (assistant)
- 2013–2014: FC Luch-Energiya Vladivostok (assistant)
- 2014–2015: FC Luch-Energiya Vladivostok
- 2015–2017: FC Luch-Energiya Vladivostok (assistant)
- 2017–2018: FC SKA-Khabarovsk (assistant)
- 2019: Palanga (assistant)
- 2019–2020: FC Luch Vladivostok (assistant)
- 2019: FC Luch Vladivostok (caretaker)
- 2021–2022: FC SKA-Khabarovsk (assistant)
- 2022: FC Novosibirsk (assistant)
- 2024: KSShOR Vladivostok
- 2024–: FC SKA-Khabarovsk (assistant)
- * Club domestic league appearances and goals

Aleksandr Vladislavovich Ushakhin (Russian: Александр Владиславович Ушахин; born 26 September 1964) is a Russian professional football coach and a former player. He is an assistant coach of FC SKA-Khabarovsk.

== Career ==
On 29 January 2019, Palanga announced that Ushakhin joined the club's staff together with Artyom Gorlov.
