= FK Palanga =

Association football club from Palanga, Lithuania

- Full name: Palangos Futbolo Klubas
- Founded: 1957; 69 years ago
- Dissolved: 2019; 7 years ago
- Ground: Palanga Stadium
- Capacity: 1,400
- 2019: A Lyga, 7th of 8 (dissolved)
- Website: http://fkpalanga.lt
Home colours	Away colours

FK Palanga was a professional football club based in Palanga, Lithuania. The team competes in the A Lyga, the top division of Lithuanian football in 2018 and 2019 seasons.

== History ==
FK Palanga was founded in 2010 and introduced its first team to the third tier Antra Lyga in 2011.

FK Palanga started off strong and won this championship in the first year with no defeats. As a result of their victory, they were promoted in 2012 to the Primera Lyga (second tier).

FK Palanga plateaued for the next three years, sitting at the bottom of each standing.

This changed in 2015 as they went from strength to strength. The club changed ownership and their scores started to improve. In the Lithuanian Football League I (made up of 18 teams), they came fifth.

The club came in second in 2016.

In 2017, they won the I Lyga and earned a promotion to the A Lyga, the top division in Lithuania. To celebrate their promotion, the club was re-branded including a new logo and new colors of blue and white. The new logo features "1957", which was when the first football club in Palanga was founded.

In 2019, the team was in 7th position in the A Lyga and faced the Pirma Lyga runners-up DFK Dainava in the playoff series. They won promotion play-offs on aggregate 5–0 and saved their place in A Lyga.

Preparation for the 2019 season was started by signing Russian managers Artyom Gorlov and Aleksandr Ushakhin, who replaced the previously resigned Valdas Trakys.

In summer 2019, Vyacheslav Geraschenko became the new head coach, with Algimantas Briaunys joining as an assistant coach on 21 July 2019.

On 5 December 2019, the Lithuanian Football Federation announced that two A Lyga clubs, FK Atlantas Klaipėda and FK Palanga had been excluded from the A Lyga, fined 42,000 euros and relegated to the II Lyga due to manipulation of match results. Ten players and one staff member were punished with fines and a ban from all football activity ranging from 6 to 12 months.

== Honors ==
=== League ===
- I Lyga
  - Winners (1): 2017
  - Runners-up (1): 2016
- II Lyga
  - Winners (1): 2011

== Kit evolution ==
2011–2014 Home kit	2011–2014 Away kit	Home kit in 2015 season	Away kit in 2015 season	Alternative kit 2015	2016–2017 Home kit	2016–2017 Away kit	Currently 2018 Home	Currently 2018 Home	Goalkeeper`s kit in 2018

=== Club colors ===
- Blue and yellow since the 2015 season.
- In 2011–2014, colors were green and yellow.

FK PALANGA	FK PALANGA

== Last squad ==
As of 16 September 2019

Note: Flags indicate national team as defined under FIFA eligibility rules; some limited exceptions apply. Players may hold more than one non-FIFA nationality.

No.	Pos.	Nation	Player
31	GK	LTU	Marius Paukštė
2	DF	LTU	Aurimas Tručinskas
3	DF	LAT	Vladislavs Kuzmins
6	DF	RUS	Matvey Guyganov
14	DF	CAN	Andrew Lebre
34	DF	LTU	Klimas Gusočenko
7	MF	LTU	Klaudijus Upstas
11	MF	GEO	Giorgi Diakvnishvili

No.	Pos.	Nation	Player
14	MF	BRA	Alan Facundo Torres
26	MF	CRO	Josip Jurjević
30	MF	LAT	Andrejs Kiriļins
88	MF	LAT	Vladimirs Stepanovs
90	MF	LTU	Tadas Eliošius
20	FW	ENG	Sam Shaban
27	FW	CIV	Kouakou Privat Yao
33	FW	LTU	Dominykas Jakočiūnas

== Staff ==
Position	Name
Chairman	(Lithuania) Mindaugas Gobikas
Director of football	(Lithuania) Edgaras Barkus
Head coach	
Assistant coach	

== Notable players ==
Players who have either appeared for their respective national team at any time or received an individual award while at the club.

- (Lithuania) Kęstutis Ivaškevičius (2016)
- (Nigeria) Lukman Haruna (2018)
- (Estonia) Sergei Mošnikov (2019)
- (Ukraine) Andriy Yakovlyev (2019)

== Coaches ==
- (Lithuania) Valdas Trakys (2014–2018)
- (Russia) Artyom Gorlov and (Russia) Aleksandr Ushakhin (2019).
- (Belarus) Vyacheslav Geraschenko (July 2019 – 16 September 2019)
- (Lithuania) Algimantas Briaunys (since 16 September 2019).
