= Diego Oyarzún =

Chilean footballer (born 1993)

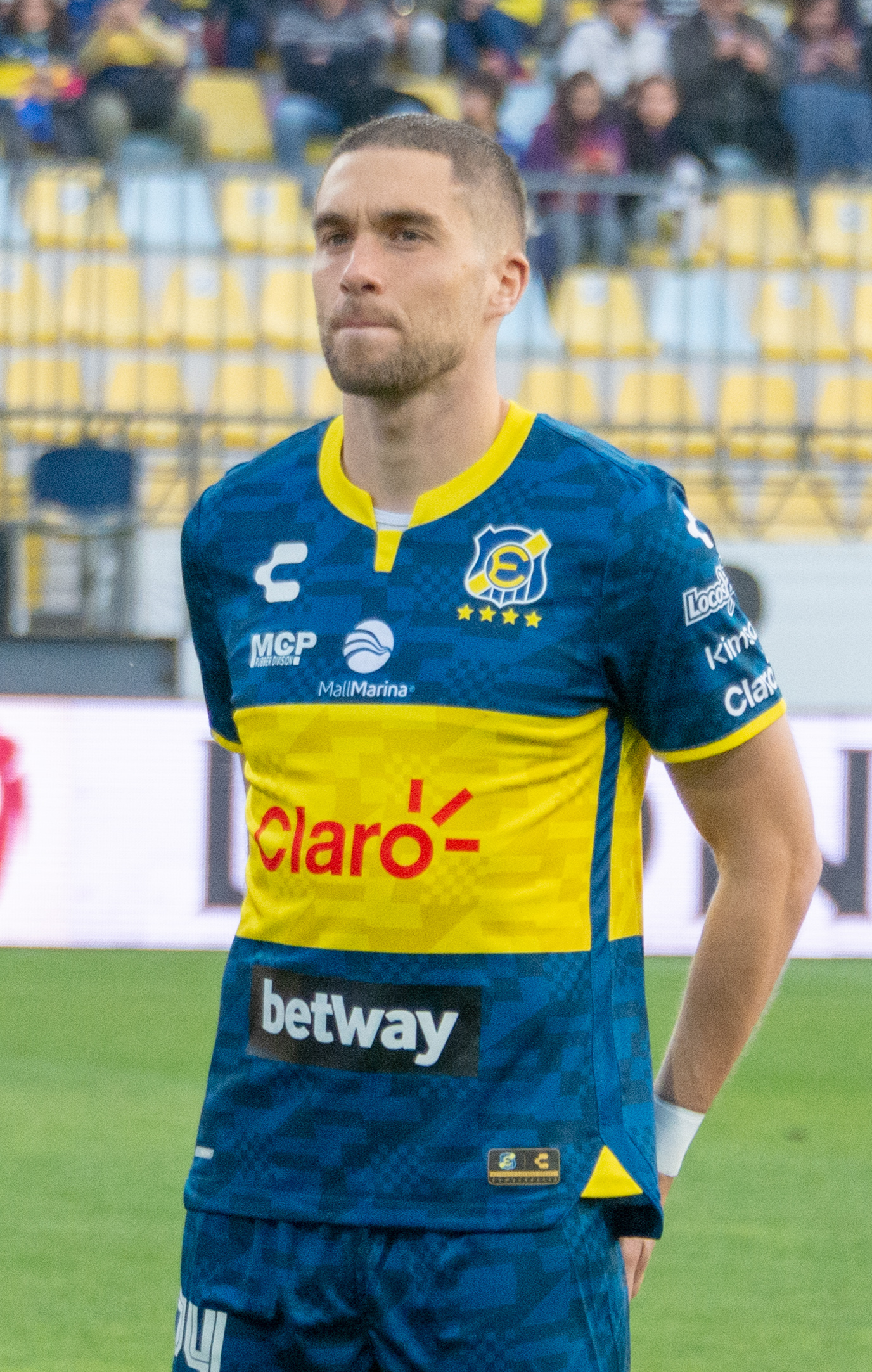

Personal information
- Full name: Diego Alejandro Oyarzún Carrasco
- Date of birth: 19 January 1993 (age 33)
- Place of birth: Santiago, Chile
- Height: 1.87 m (6 ft 1 1/2 in)
- Position: Centre back

Team information
- Current team: Everton
- Number: 24

Youth career
- 2005–2011: Universidad Católica

Senior career*
Years	Team	Apps	(Gls)
2012–2016	Universidad Católica	1	(0)
2013	→ Deportes Valdivia (loan)	21	(1)
2014–2015	→ San Marcos (loan)	23	(2)
2015–2016	→ Unión La Calera (loan)	27	(2)
2016–2017	Palestino	12	(0)
2017–2018	Žalgiris	20	(1)
2019	Coquimbo Unido	23	(1)
2020	Huachipato	20	(0)
2021–	Everton	104	(1)
- * Club domestic league appearances and goals as of 28 September 2024

Diego Alejandro Oyarzún Carrasco (born 19 January 1993), commonly known as Diego Oyarzún, is a Chilean professional footballer who plays for Everton de Viña del Mar as a central defender.

== Career ==
Diego did all lower in Universidad Católica but his debut was in Deportes Valdivia.

On 1 July 2017 Oyarzún joined Lithuanian champions Žalgiris. After 2018 season he left FK Žalgiris.

== Personal life ==
He is the son of Marcelo Oyarzún, a fitness coach and former player for Santiago Morning who was a member of technical staff of Colo-Colo at the 1991 Copa Libertadores, among others football teams, and the grandson of Nelson Oyarzún, commonly known as Consomé (Consommé), a historical Chilean football manager who used to serve a portion of broth to his players and whose name was given to the municipal stadium of Chillán.
