= Karolis Uzėla =

Lithuanian footballer

Personal information
- Date of birth: 11 March 2000 (age 26)
- Height: 1.87 m (6 ft 2 in)
- Positions: Midfielder; defender

Senior career*
Years	Team	Apps	(Gls)
2017–2022	FK Žalgiris	54	(6)
2018–2019	→ SPAL (loan)	0	(0)
2022–2023	RFS	15	(1)
2023–2024	Kauno Žalgiris	9	(0)
2025	Transinvest	0	(0)

International career^{‡}
2017–2022	Lithuania U-21	14	(1)
2021–2023	Lithuania	4	(0)
- * Club domestic league appearances and goals as of 25 April 2025 ‡ National team caps and goals as of 25 April 2025

Karolis Uzėla (born 11 March 2000) was a Lithuanian football player.

== Club career ==
He spent the 2018–19 season on loan at Italian club SPAL, where he mostly played for their Under-19 squad. He was called up to the senior team for Serie A games on two occasions but remained on the bench in both games.

On 25 January 2022, he signed a three-year contract with RFS in Latvia.

On 28 June 2023, Uzėla signed for Lithuanian club Kauno Žalgiris, on a contract until 31 December 2024.

=== Coach ===
On 24 April 2025 announced, that Uzėla ended his career of the professional footbalist. In that time he was student in Lietuvos Sporto Universitetas (LSU) and started coaching children groups in Vilnius Football Academy (VFA)

== International career ==
He made his debut for the Lithuania national football team on 2 September 2021 in a World Cup qualifier against Northern Ireland, a 1–4 home loss. He substituted Ovidijus Verbickas in the 80th minute.
