= Tomislav Kiš =

Croatian footballer (born 1994)

Personal information
- Date of birth: 4 April 1994 (age 32)
- Place of birth: Zagreb, Croatia
- Height: 1.80 m (5 ft 11 in)
- Position: Forward

Team information
- Current team: Tirana

Youth career
- 2002–2005: Dubrava
- 2005–2008: Dinamo Zagreb
- 2008–2011: Croatia Sesvete
- 2011–2012: Hajduk Split

Senior career*
Years	Team	Apps	(Gls)
2012–2015	Hajduk Split	31	(5)
2014	→ Dugopolje (loan)	4	(4)
2014	→ Gorica (loan)	17	(12)
2015	→ Zavrč (loan)	14	(6)
2015–2017	Kortrijk	17	(2)
2016–2017	→ Cercle Brugge (loan)	24	(7)
2017–2018	Shakhtyor Soligorsk	22	(6)
2018	Dugopolje	6	(1)
2019–2022	Žalgiris	64	(35)
2020	→ Seongnam (loan)	14	(3)
2022–2023	Mezőkövesd	18	(1)
2023–2026	Zrinjski Mostar	75	(22)
2026–	Tirana	9	(3)

International career
2011	Croatia U17	3	(0)
2012	Croatia U18	1	(0)
2011–2013	Croatia U19	9	(7)
2012	Croatia U20	1	(1)
2013	Croatia U21	2	(0)
- * Club domestic league appearances and goals as of 1 November 2026

Tomislav Kiš (born 4 April 1994) is a Croatian professional footballer who plays as a forward for Abissnet Superiore club Tirana.

== Club career ==
Kiš was the top scorer in the under-17s Prva HNL in the 2010–11 season, playing for Croatia Sesvete, with 27 goals in 26 matches. He joined the Hajduk Split youth team the following season. After having scored 11 more goals in that competition during fall, he was moved in January 2012 to the Hajduk's first team by coach Krasimir Balakov. He made his debut for the first team as a late substitute in a 4–2 win against NK Zagreb on 2 March 2012. He scored his first goal in Prva HNL in a 3–0 victory over Zadar on 3 November 2012.

Due to a lack of playing time in the first team at Hajduk, Kiš was loaned out to second division side NK Dugopolje in January 2014, where he made an immediate impact, scoring four goals in his first three games. In his fourth game against NK Rudeš, Kiš was injured and missed the remainder of the season. For the first part of the 2014–15 season, Kiš was loaned to the second division side HNK Gorica. During his loan period at Gorica, Kiš scored 12 goals in seventeen league appearances for the club.

On 29 August 2015, Kiš announced that he will leave Hajduk due to the lack of first team playing and unhappiness with the contract. He joined K.V. Kortrijk for an undisclosed fee. Kiš scored 3 goals in 19 games in his first season with Kortrijk.

On 8 August 2016, he went on loan to play for Cercle Brugge.

From December 2018 he is contracted to FK Žalgiris in Lithuania. During the 2019 A Lyga he played in 31 matches and scored 27 goals to become the league's top scorer in 2019. In January 2020 Kiš was loaned to South Korea's Seongnam FC for a season, with the option for the club to purchase the player in the future.

On 3 February 2022, Kiš joined Mezőkövesd in Hungary on a 2.5-year contract.

== International career ==
Kiš was a part of the Croatian national under-19 team in the first qualifying round for the 2013 UEFA European Under-19 Championship and scored six goals in three games. In the last match against Azerbaijan, he scored five times in a 7–1 victory.

== Career statistics ==
As of 18 October 2015

Appearances and goals by club, season and competition
Club	Season	League		Cup		Europe		Other		Total	
Club	Season	Apps	Goals	Apps	Goals	Apps	Goals	Apps	Goals	Apps	Goals
Hajduk Split	2011–12	5	0							5	0
Hajduk Split	2012–13	11	1	3	2					14	3
Hajduk Split	2013–14	9	2	4	2	3	0	1 (Note: Appearance in Croatian Supercup)	0	17	4
Hajduk Split	2015–16	6	2			4	2			10	4
Hajduk Split	Total	31	5	7	4	7	2	1	0	46	11
Dugopolje (loan)	2013–14	4	4							4	4
Gorica (loan)	2014–15	17	12							17	12
Zavrč (loan)	2014–15	14	6							14	6
Kortrijk	2015–16	5	2	1	1					6	3
Career total		71	29	8	5	7	2	1	0	87	36

== Honours ==
Hajduk Split

- Croatian Cup: 2012–13

Žalgiris

- A Lyga: 2021
- Lithuanian Cup: 2021

Zrinjski Mostar

- Bosnian Premier League: 2022–23, 2024–25
- Bosnian Cup: 2022–23, 2023–24
- Bosnian Supercup: 2024

Individual

- A Lyga top scorer: 2019
- A Lyga Player of the Month: March 2019, August 2019, September 2019
- Žalgiris Player of the Year: 2019
