= Paulius Golubickas =

Lithuanian footballer (born 1999)

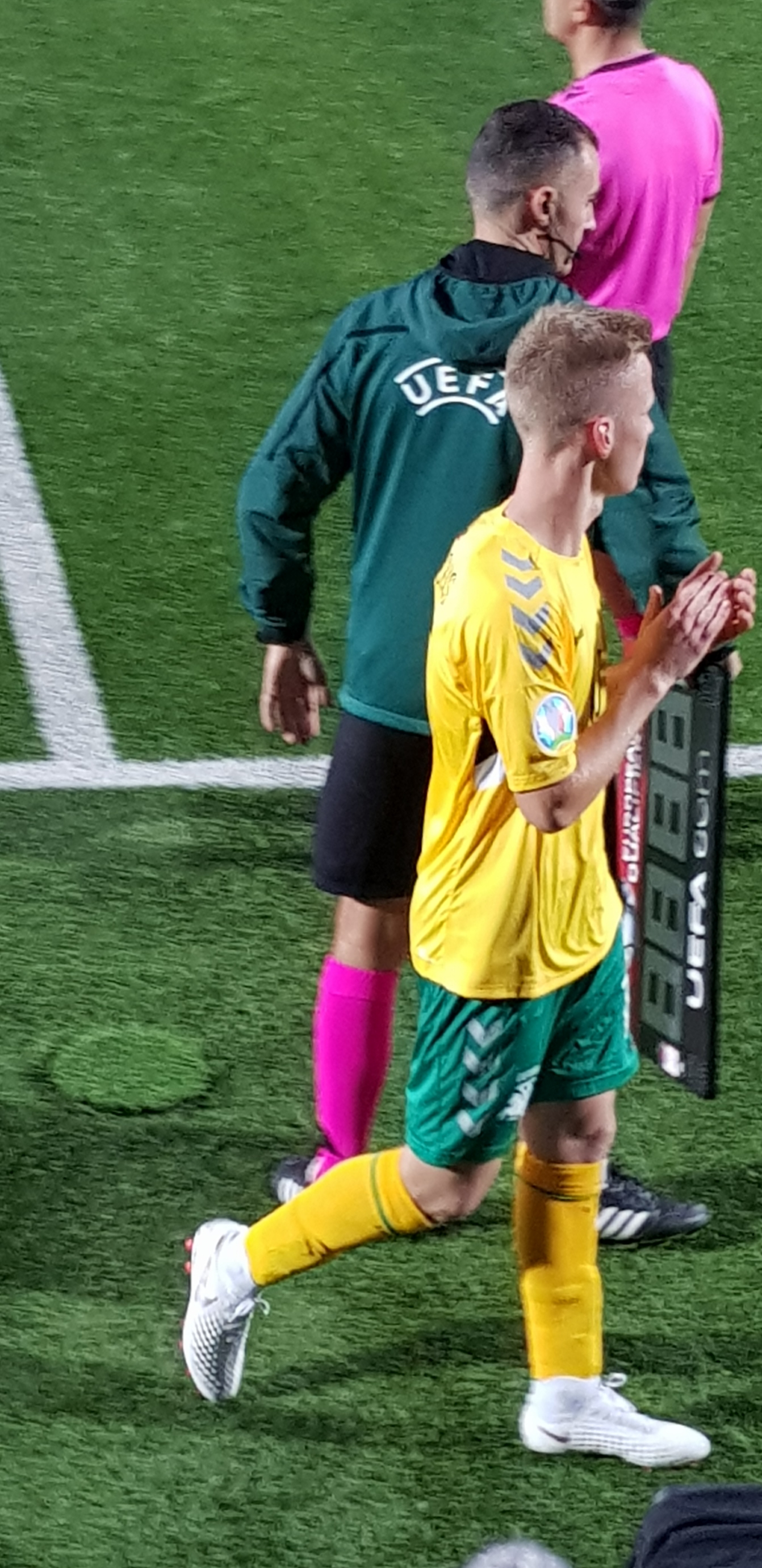

Personal information
- Full name: Paulius Golubickas
- Date of birth: 19 August 1999 (age 27)
- Place of birth: Ignalina, Lithuania
- Height: 1.73 m (5 ft 8 in)
- Position: Attacking midfielder

Team information
- Current team: Žalgiris
- Number: 10

Youth career
- –2015: Alytaus SRC

Senior career*
Years	Team	Apps	(Gls)
2015	Auska	4	(1)
2015–2016	FA Dainava	8	(6)
2016–2018	Yeovil Town	0	(0)
2018–2020	Dainava	8	(3)
2019	→ Sūduva (loan)	28	(8)
2020	→ Gorica (loan)	5	(0)
2020–2023	Gorica	36	(1)
2021	→ Dainava (loan)	14	(0)
2023–2024	Žalgiris	65	(11)
2025–2026	Radomiak Radom	12	(0)
2025	→ KuPS (loan)	8	(0)
2026–	Žalgiris	3	(0)

International career^{‡}
2016	Lithuania U17	1	(0)
2017	Lithuania U19	3	(0)
2019–	Lithuania	39	(2)
- * Club domestic league appearances and goals as of 9 March 2026 (UTC) ‡ National team caps and goals as of 11:11, 18 November 2025 (UTC)

Paulius Golubickas (born 19 August 1999) is a Lithuanian professional footballer who plays mostly as an attacking midfielder or forward for TOPLYGA club Žalgiris and the Lithuania national team.

== Career ==
Golubickas made his international debut for Lithuania on 25 March 2019, starting in the friendly against Azerbaijan before being substituted out for Justinas Marazas in the 62nd minute, with the match finishing as a 0–0 draw. After moving to Gorica in early 2020, he made his first Croatian First Football League appearance on 9 February 2020.

== Career statistics ==
=== International ===
As of match played 17 November 2025

Appearances and goals by national team and year
National team	Year	Apps	Goals
Lithuania
Lithuania	2019	7	0
Lithuania	2020	3	0
Lithuania	2021	2	1
Lithuania	2022	8	0
Lithuania	2023	3	0
Lithuania	2024	7	1
Lithuania	2025	9	0
Total		39	2

Scores and results list Lithuania's goal tally first, score column indicates score after each Golubickas goal.

List of international goals scored by Paulius Golubickas
No.	Date	Venue	Opponent	Score	Result	Competition
1	4 June 2021	Daugava Stadium, Riga, Latvia	Latvia	1–1	1–3	Friendly
2	12 October 2024	Darius and Girėnas Stadium, Kaunas, Lithuania	Kosovo	1–2	1–2	2024–25 UEFA Nations League C

== Honours ==
Sūduva

- A Lyga: 2019
- Lithuanian Football Cup: 2019
- Lithuanian Supercup: 2019

Žalgiris

- A Lyga: 2024
- Lithuanian Supercup: 2023

KuPS

- Veikkausliiga: 2025

Individual

- A Lyga Young Player of the Month: March 2019, May 2019
- A Lyga Young Player of the Year
