= Pavel Kruk =

Belarusian footballer

Personal information
- Date of birth: 3 February 1992 (age 34)
- Place of birth: Minsk, Belarus
- Height: 1.86 m (6 ft 1 in)
- Position: Defender

Youth career
- 2007–2009: MTZ-RIPO Minsk

Senior career*
Years	Team	Apps	(Gls)
2010–2015	Dinamo Minsk	7	(0)
2013–2015	→ Bereza-2010 (loan)	58	(0)
2016–2017	Trakai	21	(0)
2018	Belshina Bobruisk	9	(0)
2018	UAS Zhitkovichi	11	(0)
2019	Panevėžys	24	(4)
2020	Tukums 2000	0	(0)

International career
2010–2011	Belarus U19	6	(0)
2012–2013	Belarus U21	14	(0)
- * Club domestic league appearances and goals as of 22 January 2020

Pavel Kruk (Belarusian: Павел Крук; Russian: Павел Крук; born 3 February 1992) is a Belarusian former professional football player.
