= Yuriy Bushman =

Ukrainian footballer

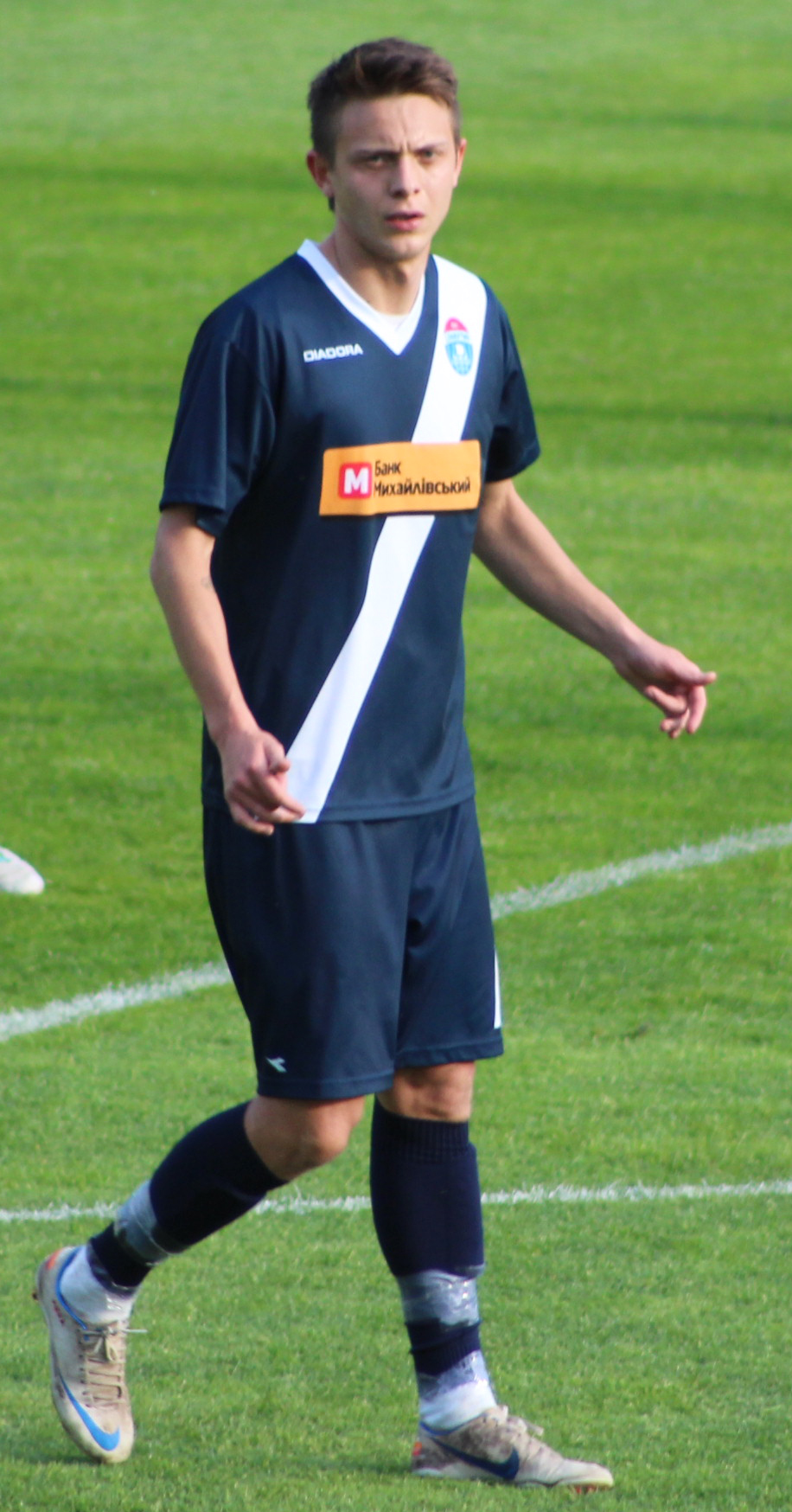

Personal information
- Full name: Yuriy Vyacheslavovych Bushman
- Date of birth: 14 May 1990 (age 36)
- Place of birth: Kyiv, Ukrainian SSR
- Height: 1.78 m (5 ft 10 in)
- Positions: Left midfielder; right midfielder

Youth career
- 2003–2004: Dynamo Kyiv
- 2004–2007: FC Vidradnyi Kyiv

Senior career*
Years	Team	Apps	(Gls)
2008–2013	Arsenal Kyiv	15	(0)
2010	→ Prykarpattya Ivano-Frankivsk (loan)	3	(0)
2011	→ Naftovyk-Ukrnafta Okhtyrka (loan)	4	(0)
2012	→ Zirka Kirovohrad (loan)	9	(1)
2014–2017	Cherkaskyi Dnipro	85	(15)
2017	Sumy	20	(4)
2018	Arsenal Kyiv	21	(0)
2019–2021	Kauno Žalgiris	46	(8)
2021–2024	Kyzylzhar	89	(11)
- * Club domestic league appearances and goals as of 16 November 2024

Yuriy Bushman (Ukrainian: Юрій В'ячеславович Бушман; born 14 May 1990) is a Ukrainian professional footballer who plays as a midfielder.

== Club career ==
Bushman is a product of Youth School Vidradnyi Kyiv.

Before his debut for FC Arsenal on 2 March 2013, he spent more than 80 matches for junior team in the Ukrainian Premier Reserve League.
