= Artyom Gorlov =

Russian football coach (born 1987)

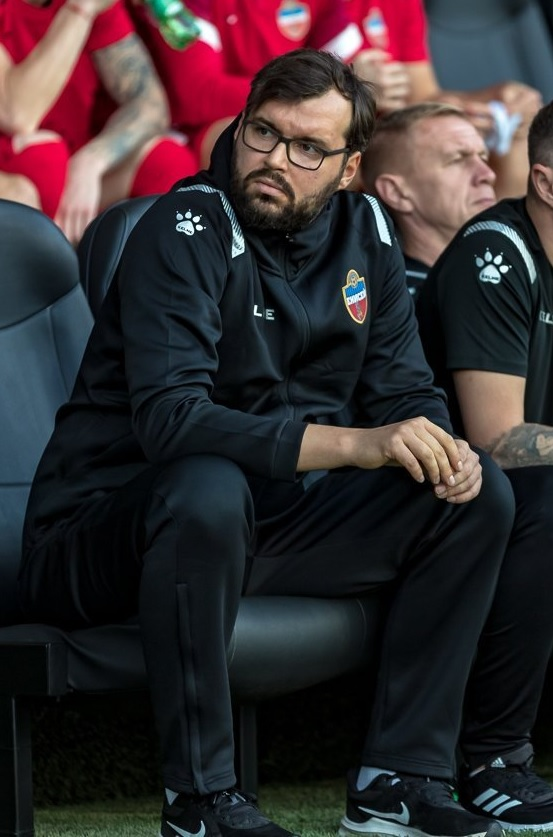
- Gorlov with Yenisey Krasnoyarsk in 2022

Personal information
- Full name: Artyom Sergeyevich Gorlov
- Date of birth: 23 June 1987 (age 39)
- Place of birth: Moscow, Russian SFSR, Soviet Union

Youth career
- Years: Team
- 1993–2005: CSKA Moscow

Managerial career
- 2011–2012: SKA-Energia Khabarovsk (analyst)
- 2013: Luch-Energia Vladivostok (analyst)
- 2014: Domodedovo-2 Moscow
- 2014–2017: Domodedovo Moscow
- 2017–2018: Kuban-2 Krasnodar
- 2018: Dolgoprudny
- 2019: Palanga
- 2020: Lokomotiv Daugavpils
- 2021: Noah Jurmala
- 2021–2022: Znamya Truda Orekhovo-Zuyevo
- 2022: Yenisey Krasnoyarsk
- 2023: Pari Nizhny Novgorod
- 2023: Torpedo Moscow (assistant)
- 2023: Torpedo Moscow (caretaker)
- 2023: Torpedo Moscow
- 2024: Akhmat Grozny (assistant)
- 2025: Saturn Ramenskoye

Artyom Sergeyevich Gorlov (Russian: Артём Сергеевич Горлов; born 23 June 1987) is a Russian football coach and a former player.

== Career ==
On 29 January 2019, Gorlov was announced as manager of Lithuanian A Lyga side Palanga, replacing Valdas Trakys. During the season many reports about Palanga involvement in match fixing were received by Lithuanian Football Federation while Artyom Gorlov was head coach there. After the season numerous club persons received punishment from Lithuanian football federation for match fixing.

On 31 December 2022, Gorlov was hired by Russian Premier League club Pari Nizhny Novgorod. Pari NN won on his debut in a Russian Cup game against the third-tier side Zvezda Saint Petersburg, and after that lost the next five games, including a game awarded to their opponents for fielding an ineligible player. Gorlov left Pari NN by mutual consent on 4 April 2023.
